= 2015 Spa-Francorchamps GP3 Series round =

(Belgium) 2015 Spa-Francorchamps GP3 round
Round details
- Round 5 of 9 rounds in the 2015 GP3 Series
- Layout of the Circuit de Spa-Francorchamps
- Location: Circuit de Spa-Francorchamps, Francorchamps, Wallonia, Belgium
- Course: Permanent racing facility 7.004 km (4.352 mi)

GP3 Series

Race 1
- Date: 22 August 2015
- Laps: 15

Pole position
Driver	(Italy) Luca Ghiotto	Trident
- Time: 2:04.943

Podium
First	(United Kingdom) Emil Bernstorff	Arden International
Second	(France) Esteban Ocon	ART Grand Prix
Third	(Germany) Marvin Kirchhöfer	ART Grand Prix

Fastest lap
Driver	(Italy) Luca Ghiotto	Trident
- Time: 2:07.819 (on lap 2)

Race 2
- Date: 23 August 2015
- Laps: 13

Podium
First	(Italy) Luca Ghiotto	Trident
Second	(France) Esteban Ocon	ART Grand Prix
Third	(Mexico) Alfonso Celis Jr.	ART Grand Prix

Fastest lap
Driver	(Italy) Luca Ghiotto	Trident
- Time: 2:08.697 (on lap 2)

The 2015 Spa-Francorchamps GP3 Series round was a GP3 Series motor race held on August 22 and 23, 2015 at Circuit de Spa-Francorchamps, Belgium. It was the fifth round of the 2015 GP3 Series. The race supported the 2015 Belgian Grand Prix.

== Classification ==
=== Qualifying ===
Pos.	No.	Driver	Team	Time	Grid
1	27	(Italy) Luca Ghiotto	Trident	2:04.943	1
2	6	(France) Esteban Ocon	ART Grand Prix	2:05.114	2
3	5	(Germany) Marvin Kirchhöfer	ART Grand Prix	2:05.144	6
4	15	(United Kingdom) Emil Bernstorff	Arden International	2:05.308	3
5	1	(Italy) Antonio Fuoco	Carlin	2:05.458	4
6	14	(Italy) Kevin Ceccon	Arden International	2:05.591	5
7	12	(United Kingdom) Matt Parry	Koiranen GP	2:05.618	7
8	21	(Switzerland) Mathéo Tuscher	Jenzer Motorsport	2:05.669	8
9	11	(Sweden) Jimmy Eriksson	Koiranen GP	2:05.704	9
10	4	(Mexico) Alfonso Celis Jr.	ART Grand Prix	2:05.834	10
11	2	(United Kingdom) Jann Mardenborough	Carlin	2:05.869	11
12	20	(Norway) Pål Varhaug	Jenzer Motorsport	2:05.931	12
13	7	(United Kingdom) Seb Morris	Status Grand Prix	2:05.938	13
14	24	(Spain) Alex Palou	Campos Racing	2:05.939	14
15	3	(Australia) Mitchell Gilbert	Carlin	2:06.065	15
16	22	(Switzerland) Ralph Boschung	Jenzer Motorsport	2:06.110	16
17	26	(Poland) Artur Janosz	Trident	2:06.314	17
18	8	(Switzerland) Alex Fontana	Status Grand Prix	2:06.317	18
19	28	(Netherlands) Beitske Visser	Trident	2:06.373	19
20	10	(Hong Kong) Adderly Fong	Koiranen GP	2:06.537	20
21	16	(Poland) Aleksander Bosak	Arden International	2:06.538	21
22	23	(Kuwait) Zaid Ashkanani	Campos Racing	2:06.922	22
23	9	(Thailand) Sandy Stuvik	Status Grand Prix	2:07.106	23

=== Feature race ===
Pos.	No.	Driver	Team	Laps	Time/Retired	Grid	Points
1	15	(United Kingdom) Emil Bernstorff	Arden International	15	44:00.242	3	25
2	6	(France) Esteban Ocon	ART Grand Prix	15	+3.945	2	18
3	5	(Germany) Marvin Kirchhöfer	ART Grand Prix	15	+4.487	6	15
4	1	(Italy) Antonio Fuoco	Carlin	15	+4.763	4	12
5	27	(Italy) Luca Ghiotto	Trident	15	+8.551	1	10+4+2
6	4	(Mexico) Alfonso Celis Jr.	ART Grand Prix	15	+14.541	10	8
7	24	(Spain) Alex Palou	Campos Racing	15	+17.492	14	6
8	16	(Poland) Aleksander Bosak	Arden International	15	+22.432	21	4
9	22	(Switzerland) Ralph Boschung	Jenzer Motorsport	15	+22.671	16	2
10	8	(Switzerland) Alex Fontana	Status Grand Prix	15	+23.145	18	1
11	3	(Australia) Mitchell Gilbert	Carlin	15	+24.762	15	
12	26	(Poland) Artur Janosz	Trident	15	+27.390	17	
13	11	(Sweden) Jimmy Eriksson	Koiranen GP	15	+27.442	9	
14	23	(Kuwait) Zaid Ashkanani	Campos Racing	15	+29.327	22	
15	10	(Hong Kong) Adderly Fong	Koiranen GP	15	+45.303	20	
Ret	9	(Thailand) Sandy Stuvik	Status Grand Prix	11	collision	23	
Ret	21	(Switzerland) Mathéo Tuscher	Jenzer Motorsport	11	collision	8	
Ret	7	(United Kingdom) Seb Morris	Status Grand Prix	8	collision	13	
Ret	20	(Norway) Pål Varhaug	Jenzer Motorsport	8	collision	12	
Ret	28	(Netherlands) Beitske Visser	Trident	7	Retired	19	
Ret	12	(United Kingdom) Matt Parry	Koiranen GP	4	Retired	7	
Ret	2	(United Kingdom) Jann Mardenborough	Carlin	2	Accident	11	
Ret	14	(Italy) Kevin Ceccon	Arden International	1	Retired	5	

== See also ==
- 2015 Belgian Grand Prix
- 2015 Spa-Francorchamps GP2 Series round

Previous round: 2015 Hungaroring GP3 Series round	GP3 Series; 2015 season	Next round: 2015 Monza GP3 Series round
Previous round: 2014 Spa-Francorchamps GP3 Series round	Spa-Francorchamps GP3 round	Next round: 2016 Spa-Francorchamps GP3 Series round
