= 2015 Red Bull Ring GP3 Series round =

Motor racing competition

(Austria) 2015 Red Bull Ring GP3 round
Round details
- Round 2 of 9 rounds in the 2015 GP3 Series
- Layout of the Red Bull Ring
- Location: Red Bull Ring, Spielberg, Styria, Austria
- Course: Permanent racing facility 4.326 km (2.688 mi)

GP3 Series

Race 1
- Date: 20 June 2015
- Laps: 24

Pole position
Driver	(Italy) Luca Ghiotto	Trident
- Time: 1:19.350

Podium
First	(Italy) Luca Ghiotto	Trident
Second	(Italy) Antonio Fuoco	Carlin
Third	(France) Esteban Ocon	ART Grand Prix

Fastest lap
Driver	(Italy) Luca Ghiotto	Trident
- Time: 1:21.854 (on lap 7)

Race 2
- Date: 21 June 2015
- Laps: 18

Podium
First	(Colombia) Óscar Tunjo	Trident
Second	(Germany) Marvin Kirchhöfer	ART Grand Prix
Third	(Italy) Antonio Fuoco	Trident

Fastest lap
Driver	(Italy) Luca Ghiotto	Trident
- Time: 1:22.058 (on lap 6)

The 2015 Red Bull Ring GP3 Series round was a GP3 Series motor race held on 20 and 21 June 2015 at the Red Bull Ring in Austria. It was the second round of the 2015 GP3 Series. The race weekend supported the 2015 Austrian Grand Prix.

== Classification ==
=== Qualifying ===
Pos.	No.	Driver	Team	Time	Grid
1	27	(Italy) Luca Ghiotto	Trident	1:19.350	1
2	6	(France) Esteban Ocon	ART Grand Prix	1:19.555	2
3	24	(Spain) Álex Palou	Campos Racing	1:19.624	3
4	5	(Germany) Marvin Kirchhöfer	ART Grand Prix	1:19.803	4
5	15	(United Kingdom) Emil Bernstorff	Arden International	1:19.823	5
6	12	(United Kingdom) Matt Parry	Koiranen GP	1:19.877	6
7	9	(Thailand) Sandy Stuvik	Status Grand Prix	1:19.970	7
8	1	(Italy) Antonio Fuoco	Carlin	1:19.977	8
9	11	(Sweden) Jimmy Eriksson	Koiranen GP	1:20.127	9
10	3	(Australia) Mitchell Gilbert	Carlin	1:20.130	10
11	22	(Switzerland) Ralph Boschung	Jenzer Motorsport	1:20.144	11
12	2	(United Kingdom) Jann Mardenborough	Carlin	1:20.175	12
13	21	(Switzerland) Matheo Tuscher	Jenzer Motorsport	1:20.296	13
14	4	(Mexico) Alfonso Celis Jr.	ART Grand Prix	1:20.333	14
15	8	(Switzerland) Alex Fontana	Status Grand Prix	1:20.346	15
16	26	(Poland) Artur Janosz	Trident	1:20.379	16
17	28	(Colombia) Oscar Tunjo	Trident	1:20.399	17
18	14	(Italy) Kevin Ceccon	Arden International	1:20.404	18
19	20	(Norway) Pal Varhaug	Jenzer Motorsport	1:20.431	19
20	10	(Hong Kong) Adderly Fong	Koiranen GP	1:20.776	20
21	7	(United Kingdom) Seb Morris	Trident	1:20.787	21
22	8	(Kuwait) Zaid Ashkanani	Campos Racing	1:20.927	22
23	16	(Poland) Aleksander Bosak	Arden International	1:21.172	23
24	25	(Venezuela) Samin Gomez	Campos Racing	1:21.770	24

=== Feature Race ===
Pos.	No.	Driver	Team	Laps	Time/Retired	Grid	Points
1	27	(Italy) Luca Ghiotto	Trident	24	38:25.156	1	25+4+2
2	1	(Italy) Antonio Fuoco	Carlin	24	+11.958	8	18
3	6	(France) Esteban Ocon	ART Grand Prix	24	+12.641	2	15
4	15	(United Kingdom) Emil Bernstorff	Arden International	24	+13.437	5	12
5	2	(United Kingdom) Jann Mardenborough	Carlin	24	+19.335	12	10
6	5	(Germany) Marvin Kirchhöfer	ART Grand Prix	24	+19.709	4	8
7	9	(Thailand) Sandy Stuvik	Status Grand Prix	24	+28.749	7	6
8	22	(Switzerland) Ralph Boschung	Jenzer Motorsport	24	+29.462	11	4
9	28	(Colombia) Óscar Tunjo	Trident	24	+33.071	17	2
10	8	(Switzerland) Alex Fontana	Status Grand Prix	24	+34.521	15	1
11	20	(Norway) Pål Varhaug	Jenzer Motorsport	24	+36.069	19	
12	21	(Switzerland) Mathéo Tuscher	Jenzer Motorsport	24	+39.669	13	
13	12	(United Kingdom) Matt Parry	Koiranen GP	24	+40.589	6	
14	24	(Spain) Álex Palou	Campos Racing	24	+42.534	3	
15	4	(Mexico) Alfonso Celis Jr.	ART Grand Prix	24	+42.934	14	
16	16	(Poland) Aleksander Bosak	Arden International	24	+43.331	23	
17	10	(Hong Kong) Adderly Fong	Koiranen GP	24	+43.848	20	
18	23	(Kuwait) Zaid Ashkanani	Campos Racing	24	+44.126	22	
19	7	(United Kingdom) Seb Morris	Status Grand Prix	24	+48.713	21	
20	11	(Sweden) Jimmy Eriksson	Koiranen GP	23	+1 lap	9	
21	26	(Poland) Artur Janosz	Trident	22	+2 laps	16	
Ret	3	(Australia) Mitchell Gilbert	Carlin	14	Retired	10	
Ret	14	(Italy) Kevin Ceccon	Arden International	0	Retired	18	
Ret	25	(Venezuela) Samin Gómez	Campos Racing	0	Retired	24	

=== Sprint Race ===
Pos.	No.	Driver	Team	Laps	Time/Retired	Grid	Points
1	28	(Colombia) Óscar Tunjo	Trident	18	26:51.893	9	15
2	5	(Germany) Marvin Kirchhöfer	ART Grand Prix	18	+3.034	3	12
3	27	(Italy) Luca Ghiotto	Trident	18	+4.093	8	10+2
4	15	(United Kingdom) Emil Bernstorff	Arden International	18	+5.394	5	8
5	7	(United Kingdom) Seb Morris	Status Grand Prix	18	+10.494	19	6
6	8	(Switzerland) Alex Fontana	Status Grand Prix	18	+11.179	10	4
7	12	(United Kingdom) Matt Parry	Koiranen GP	18	+11.257	13	2
8	22	(Switzerland) Ralph Boschung	Jenzer Motorsport	18	+14.686	1	1
9	26	(Poland) Artur Janosz	Trident	18	+18.900	21	
10	11	(Sweden) Jimmy Eriksson	Koiranen GP	18	+19.657	20	
11	3	(Australia) Mitchell Gilbert	Carlin	18	+19.787	22	
12	10	(Hong Kong) Adderly Fong	Koiranen GP	18	+19.940	17	
13	2	(United Kingdom) Jann Mardenborough	Carlin	18	+20.255	4	
14	23	(Kuwait) Zaid Ashkanani	Campos Racing	18	+27.495	18	
15	16	(Poland) Aleksander Bosak	Arden International	18	+28.306	16	
16	25	(Venezuela) Samin Gómez	Campos Racing	17	+1 lap	24	
Ret	9	(Thailand) Sandy Stuvik	Status Grand Prix	0	Retired	2	
Ret	1	(Italy) Antonio Fuoco	Carlin	0	Retired	7	
Ret	4	(Mexico) Alfonso Celis Jr.	ART Grand Prix	0	Retired	15	
Ret	20	(Norway) Pål Varhaug	Jenzer Motorsport	0	Retired	11	
Ret	24	(Spain) Álex Palou	Campos Racing	0	Retired	14	
DNS	14	(Italy) Kevin Ceccon	Arden International	0	Did not start	23	
DSQ	21	(Switzerland) Mathéo Tuscher	Jenzer Motorsport	18	Disqualified	12	
DSQ	6	(France) Esteban Ocon	ART Grand Prix	18	Disqualified	6	

== See also ==
- 2015 Austrian Grand Prix
- 2015 Red Bull Ring GP2 Series round

Previous round: 2015 Catalunya GP3 Series round	GP3 Series; 2015 season	Next round: 2015 Silverstone GP3 Series round
Previous round: 2014 Red Bull Ring GP3 Series round	Red Bull Ring GP3 round	Next round: 2016 Red Bull Ring GP3 Series round
