= 2015 Hungaroring GP3 Series round =

Motor racing competition

(Hungary) 2015 Hungaroring GP3 round
Round details
- Round 4 of 9 rounds in the 2015 GP3 Series
- Layout of the Hungaroring
- Location: Hungaroring, Mogyoród, Pest, Hungary
- Course: Permanent racing facility 4.381 km (2.722 mi)

GP3 Series

Race 1
- Date: 25 July 2015
- Laps: 22

Pole position
Driver	(Italy) Luca Ghiotto	Trident
- Time: 1:34.030

Podium
First	(Italy) Luca Ghiotto	Trident
Second	(France) Esteban Ocon	ART Grand Prix
Third	(Germany) Marvin Kirchhöfer	ART Grand Prix

Fastest lap
Driver	(Italy) Luca Ghiotto	Trident
- Time: 1:36.218 (on lap 20)

Race 2
- Date: 26 July 2015
- Laps: 16

Podium
First	(Italy) Kevin Ceccon	Arden International
Second	(France) Esteban Ocon	ART Grand Prix
Third	(United Kingdom) Matt Parry	Koiranen GP

Fastest lap
Driver	(France) Esteban Ocon	ART Grand Prix
- Time: 1:35.924 (on lap 16)

The 2015 Hungaroring GP3 Series round was a GP3 Series motor race held on 24 and 26 July 2015 at the Hungaroring in Mogyoród, Pest, Hungary. It was the fourth round of the 2015 GP3 Series. The race weekend supported the 2015 Hungarian Grand Prix.

== Classification ==
=== Qualifying ===
Pos.	No.	Driver	Team	Time	Gap	Grid
1	27	(Italy) Luca Ghiotto	Trident	1:34.030		1
2	15	(United Kingdom) Emil Bernstorff	Arden International	1:34.066	+0.036	2
3	6	(France) Esteban Ocon	ART Grand Prix	1:34.214	+0.148	3
4	5	(Germany) Marvin Kirchhöfer	ART Grand Prix	1:34.231	+0.201	4
5	11	(Sweden) Jimmy Eriksson	Koiranen GP	1:34.359	+0.329	5
6	12	(United Kingdom) Matt Parry	Koiranen GP	1:34.522	+0.492	6
7	24	(Spain) Álex Palou	Campos Racing	1:34.526	+0.496	7
8	1	(Italy) Antonio Fuoco	Carlin	1:34.571	+0.541	8
9	14	(Italy) Kevin Ceccon	Arden International	1:34.744	+0.714	9
10	20	(Norway) Pål Varhaug	Arden International	1:34.745	+0.715	10
11	3	(Australia) Mitchell Gilbert	Carlin	1:34.751	+0.721	11
12	21	(Switzerland) Matheo Tuscher	Jenzer Motorsport	1:34.766	+0.736	12
13	7	(United Kingdom) Seb Morris	Status Grand Prix	1:34.873	+0.843	13
14	22	(Switzerland) Ralph Boschung	Jenzer Motorsport	1:35.001	+0.971	14
15	26	(Poland) Artur Janosz	Trident	1:35.008	+0.978	15
16	8	(Switzerland) Alex Fontana	Status Grand Prix	1:35.071	+1.041	16
17	9	(Thailand) Sandy Stuvik	Status Grand Prix	1:35.091	+1.061	17
18	2	(United Kingdom) Jann Mardenborough	Carlin	1:35.108	+1.078	18
19	10	(Hong Kong) Adderly Fong	Koiranen GP	1:35.255	+1.225	19
20	23	(Kuwait) Zaid Ashkanani	Campos Racing	1:36.140	+2.110	20
21	16	(Poland) Aleksander Bosak	Arden International	1:36.235	+2.205	21
22	25	(Venezuela) Samin Gómez	Campos Racing	1:37.164	+3.134	22
23	4	(Mexico) Alfonso Celis Jr.	ART Grand Prix			23

=== Feature Race ===
Pos.	No.	Driver	Team	Laps	Time/Retired	Grid	Points
1	27	(Italy) Luca Ghiotto	Trident	22	38:29.253	1	25+4+2
2	6	(France) Esteban Ocon	ART Grand Prix	22	+3.500	3	18
3	5	(Germany) Marvin Kirchhöfer	ART Grand Prix	22	+6.224	4	15
4	15	(United Kingdom) Emil Bernstorff	Arden International	22	+6.516	2	12
5	12	(United Kingdom) Matt Parry	Koiranen GP	22	+6.960	6	10
6	11	(Sweden) Jimmy Eriksson	Koiranen GP	22	+7.782	5	8
7	14	(Italy) Kevin Ceccon	Arden International	22	+8.265	9	6
8	1	(Italy) Antonio Fuoco	Carlin	22	+11.390	8	4
9	20	(Norway) Pål Varhaug	Jenzer Motorsport	22	+11.833	10	2
10	21	(Switzerland) Mathéo Tuscher	Jenzer Motorsport	22	+15.200	12	1
11	3	(Australia) Mitchell Gilbert	Carlin	22	+15.325	11	
12	7	(United Kingdom) Seb Morris	Status Grand Prix	22	+15.658	13	
13	22	(Switzerland) Ralph Boschung	Jenzer Motorsport	22	+16.879	14	
14	8	(Switzerland) Alex Fontana	Status Grand Prix	22	+21.995	16	
15	10	(Hong Kong) Adderly Fong	Koiranen GP	22	+23.773	19	
16	26	(Poland) Artur Janosz	Trident	22	+24.340	15	
17	16	(Poland) Aleksander Bosak	Arden International	22	+27.838	21	
18	4	(Mexico) Alfonso Celis Jr.	ART Grand Prix	22	+29.530	23	
19	24	(Spain) Álex Palou	Campos Racing	22	+31.790	7	
20	23	(Kuwait) Zaid Ashkanani	Campos Racing	22	+40.005	20	
21	25	(Venezuela) Samin Gómez	Campos Racing	22	+48.626	22	
22	9	(Thailand) Sandy Stuvik	Status Grand Prix	20	+2 laps	17	
Ret	2	(United Kingdom) Jann Mardenborough	Carlin	1	Retired	18	

=== Sprint Race ===
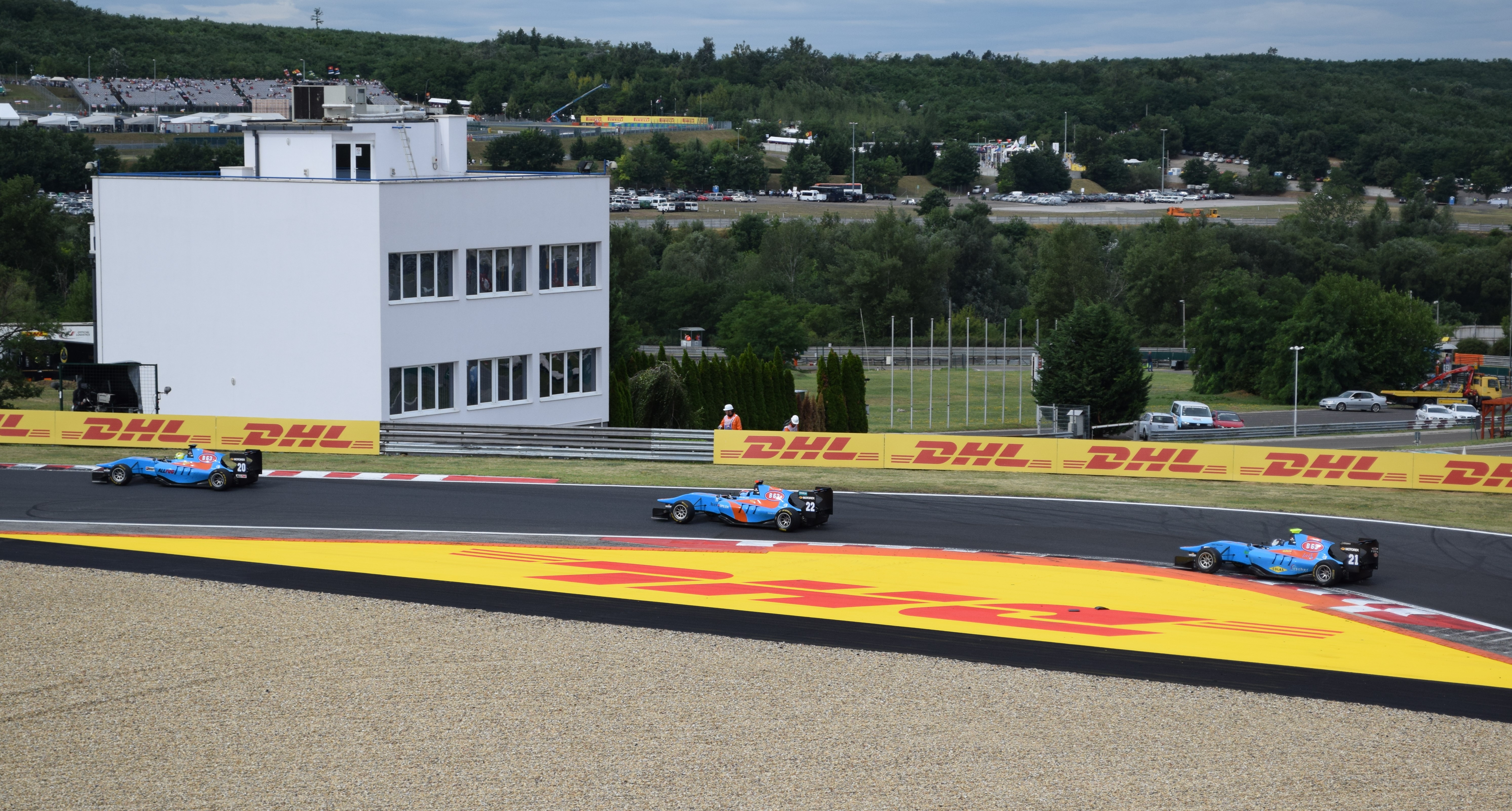
Three Jenzer Motorsport cars at Turn 7.

Pos.	No.	Driver	Team	Laps	Time/Retired	Grid	Points
1	14	(Italy) Kevin Ceccon	Arden International	16	27:56.869	2	15
2	6	(France) Esteban Ocon	ART Grand Prix	16	+0.766	7	12+2
3	12	(United Kingdom) Matt Parry	Koiranen GP	16	+3.316	4	10
4	27	(Italy) Luca Ghiotto	Trident	16	+4.495	8	8
5	5	(Germany) Marvin Kirchhöfer	ART Grand Prix	16	+7.445	6	6
6	11	(Sweden) Jimmy Eriksson	Koiranen GP	16	+7.753	3	4
7	20	(Norway) Pål Varhaug	Jenzer Motorsport	16	+8.846	9	2
8	22	(Switzerland) Ralph Boschung	Jenzer Motorsport	16	+9.752	13	1
9	21	(Switzerland) Mathéo Tuscher	Jenzer Motorsport	16	+10.232	10	
10	3	(Australia) Mitchell Gilbert	Carlin	16	+12.251	11	
11	10	(Hong Kong) Adderly Fong	Koiranen GP	16	+15.322	15	
12	7	(United Kingdom) Seb Morris	Status Grand Prix	16	+18.012	12	
13	8	(Switzerland) Alex Fontana	Status Grand Prix	16	+18.550	14	
14	9	(Thailand) Sandy Stuvik	Status Grand Prix	16	+19.835	22	
15	4	(Mexico) Alfonso Celis Jr.	ART Grand Prix	16	+21.685	18	
16	23	(Kuwait) Zaid Ashkanani	Campos Racing	16	+28.636	20	
17	2	(United Kingdom) Jann Mardenborough	Carlin	16	+28.937	23	
18	24	(Spain) Álex Palou	Campos Racing	16	+29.349	19	
19	16	(Poland) Aleksander Bosak	Arden International	16	+38.072	17	
Ret	25	(Venezuela) Samin Gómez	Campos Racing	11	Retired	21	
Ret	26	(Poland) Artur Janosz	Trident	0	Retired	16	
Ret	1	(Italy) Antonio Fuoco	Carlin	0	Retired	1	
Ret	15	(United Kingdom) Emil Bernstorff	Arden International	0	Retired	5	

== See also ==
- 2015 Hungarian Grand Prix
- 2015 Hungaroring GP2 Series round

Previous round: 2015 Silverstone GP3 Series round	GP3 Series; 2015 season	Next round: 2015 Spa-Francorchamps GP3 Series round
Previous round: 2014 Hungaroring GP3 Series round	Hungaroring GP3 round	Next round: 2016 Hungaroring GP3 Series round
