= 2015 Silverstone GP3 Series round =

Motor races at Silverstone, England

(England) 2015 Silverstone GP3 round
Round details
- Round 3 of 9 rounds in the 2015 GP3 Series
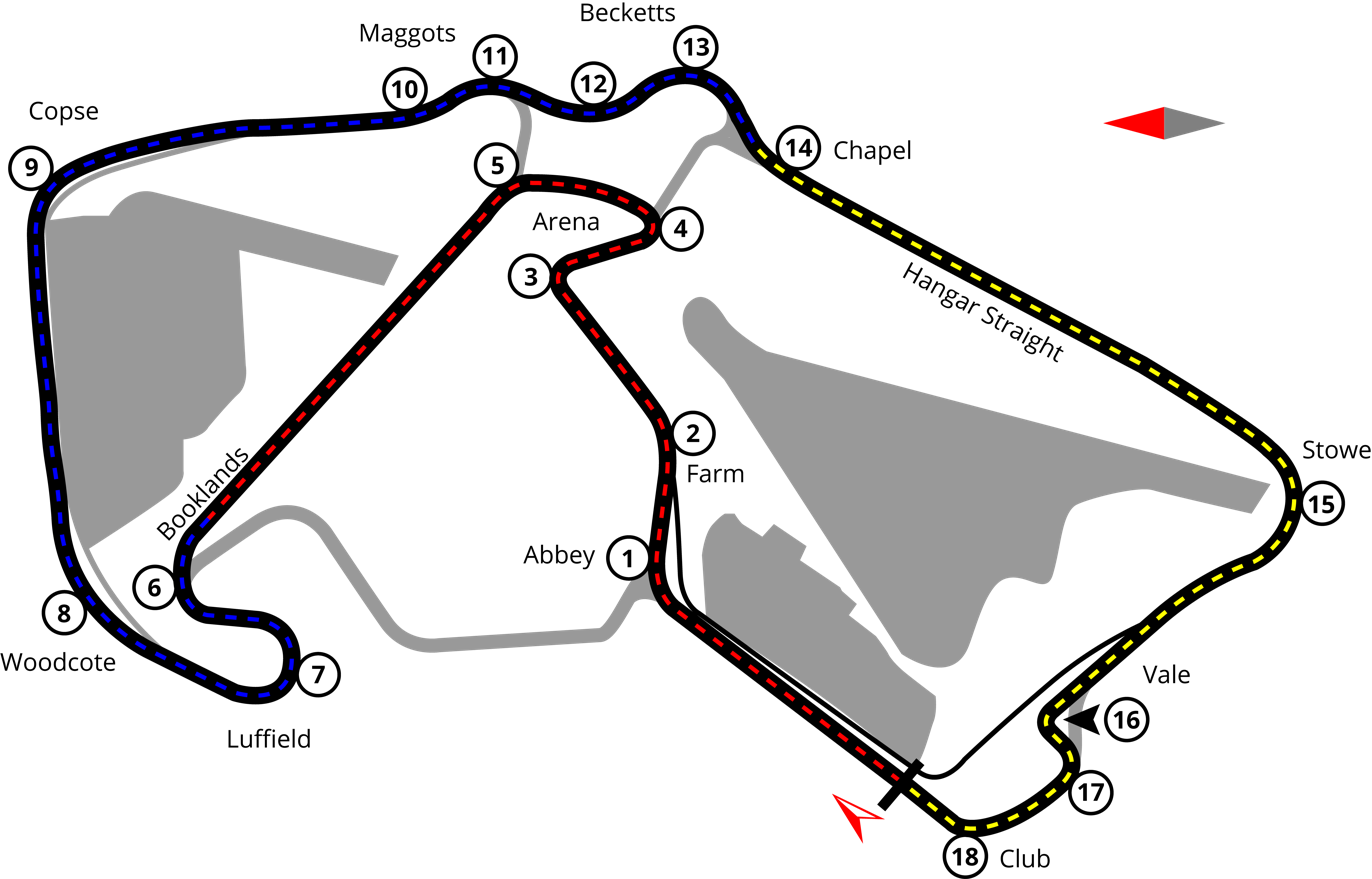
- Layout of the Silverstone Circuit
- Location: Silverstone Circuit; Silverstone, England
- Course: Permanent racing facility 5.891 km (3.660 mi)

GP3 Series

Race 1
- Date: 4 July 2015
- Laps: 20

Pole position
Driver	(Germany) Marvin Kirchhöfer	ART Grand Prix
- Time: 1:47.040

Podium
First	(Germany) Marvin Kirchhöfer	ART Grand Prix
Second	(United Kingdom) Emil Bernstorff	Arden International
Third	(United Kingdom) Matt Parry	Koiranen GP

Fastest lap
Driver	(Italy) Luca Ghiotto	Trident
- Time: 1:50.026 (on lap 15)

Race 2
- Date: 5 July 2015
- Laps: 15

Podium
First	(Italy) Kevin Ceccon	Arden International
Second	(France) Esteban Ocon	ART Grand Prix
Third	(Switzerland) Ralph Boschung	Jenzer Motorsport

Fastest lap
Driver	(Italy) Kevin Ceccon	Arden International
- Time: 1:48.770 (on lap 7)

The 2015 Silverstone GP3 Series round was a GP3 Series motor race held on 4 and 5 July 2015 at Silverstone Circuit in Silverstone, England. It was the third round of the 2015 GP3 Series. The race was used to support the 2015 British Grand Prix.

== Classification ==
=== Qualifying ===
Pos.	No.	Driver	Team	Time	Gap	Grid
1	5	(Germany) Marvin Kirchhöfer	ART Grand Prix	1:47.040		1
2	15	(United Kingdom) Emil Bernstorff	Arden International	1:47.197	+ 0.157 s	2
3	24	(Spain) Álex Palou	Campos Racing	1:47.237	+ 0.197 s	3
4	12	(United Kingdom) Matt Parry	Koiranen GP	1:47.258	+ 0.218 s	4
5	11	(Sweden) Jimmy Eriksson	Koiranen GP	1:47.389	+ 0.349 s	5
6	27	(Italy) Luca Ghiotto	Trident	1:47.602	+ 0.562 s	6
7	10	(Hong Kong) Adderly Fong	Koiranen GP	1:47.620	+ 0.580 s	7
8	6	(France) Esteban Ocon	ART Grand Prix	1:47.648	+ 0.608 s	8
9	3	(Australia) Mitchell Gilbert	ART Grand Prix	1:47.664	+ 0.624 s	9
10	14	(Italy) Kevin Ceccon	Arden International	1:47.945	+ 0.905 s	10
11	22	(Switzerland) Ralph Boschung	Jenzer Motorsport	1:48.053	+ 1.013 s	11
12	26	(Poland) Artur Janosz	Trident	1:48.086	+ 1.046 s	12
13	7	(United Kingdom) Seb Morris	Status Grand Prix	1:48.169	+ 1.129 s	13
14	2	(United Kingdom) Jann Mardenborough	Carlin	1:48.204	+ 1.164 s	14
15	28	(Colombia) Óscar Tunjo	Trident	1:48.275	+ 1.235 s	15
16	20	(Norway) Pål Varhaug	Jenzer Motorsport	1:48.338	+ 1.298 s	16
17	4	(Mexico) Alfonso Celis Jr.	ART Grand Prix	1:48.522	+ 1.482 s	17
18	8	(Switzerland) Alex Fontana	Status Grand Prix	1:48.536	+ 1.496 s	18
19	9	(Thailand) Sandy Stuvik	Status Grand Prix	1:48.541	+ 1.501 s	19
20	21	(Switzerland) Mathéo Tuscher	Jenzer Motorsport	1:48.609	+ 1.569 s	20
21	1	(Italy) Antonio Fuoco	Carlin	1:49.157	+ 2.117 s	20
22	16	(Poland) Aleksander Bosak	Arden International	1:49.351	+ 2.311 s	21
23	25	(Austria) Christopher Höher	Campos Racing	1:49.661	+ 2.621 s	23
24	23	(Kuwait) Zaid Ashkanani	Campos Racing	1:49.750	+ 2.710 s	24

=== Feature Race ===
Pos.	No.	Driver	Team	Laps	Time/Retired	Grid	Points
1	5	(Germany) Marvin Kirchhöfer	ART Grand Prix	20	37min 02.785sec	1	25 (3)
2	15	(United Kingdom) Emil Bernstorff	Arden International	20	+ 0.302 s	2	18
3	12	(United Kingdom) Matt Parry	Koiranen GP	20	+ 2.421 s	4	15
4	27	(Italy) Luca Ghiotto	Trident	20	+ 9.439 s	6	12 (2)
5	11	(Sweden) Jimmy Eriksson	Koiranen GP	20	+ 10.511 s	5	10
6	6	(France) Esteban Ocon	ART Grand Prix	20	+ 11.459 s	8	8
7	14	(Italy) Kevin Ceccon	Arden International	20	+ 12.274 s	10	6
8	22	(Switzerland) Ralph Boschung	Jenzer Motorsport	20	+ 18.732 s	11	4
9	26	(Poland) Artur Janosz	Trident	20	+ 19.932 s	12	2
10	21	(Switzerland) Matheo Tuscher	Jenzer Motorsport	20	+ 21.197 s	20	1
11	28	(Colombia) Óscar Tunjo	Trident	20	+ 22.052 s	15	
12	10	(Hong Kong) Adderly Fong	Koiranen GP	20	+ 30.193 s	7	
13	4	(Mexico) Alfonso Celis Jr.	ART Grand Prix	20	+ 33.591 s	17	
14	16	(Poland) Aleksander Bosak	Arden International	20	+ 38.177 s	22	
15	7	(United Kingdom) Seb Morris	Status Grand Prix	20	+ 38.266 s	13	
16	20	(Norway) Pål Varhaug	Jenzer Motorsport	20	+ 38.456 s	16	
17	2	(United Kingdom) Jann Mardenborough	Carlin	20	+ 38.707 s	14	
18	1	(Italy) Antonio Fuoco	Carlin	20	+ 39.270 s	21	
19	8	(Switzerland) Alex Fontana	Status Grand Prix	20	+ 40.052 s	18	
20	3	(Australia) Mitchell Gilbert	Carlin	20	+ 51.168 s	9	
21	23	(Kuwait) Zaid Ashkanani	Campos Racing	20	+ 55.378 s	24	
22	9	(Thailand) Sandy Stuvik	Status Grand Prix	20	+ 1:04.044 s	19	
23	25	(Austria) Christopher Höher	Campos Racing	20	+ 1:17.420 s	23	
Ret	24	(Spain) Álex Palou	Campos Racing	7	Retired	3	
Fastest lap: Luca Ghiotto (Trident) — 1:50.026 (on lap 15)

=== Sprint Race ===
Pos.	No.	Driver	Team	Laps	Time/Retired	Grid	Points
1	14	(Italy) Kevin Ceccon	Arden International	15	27min 30.411sec	2	15 (2)
2	6	(France) Esteban Ocon	ART Grand Prix	15	+ 1.533 s	3	12
3	22	(Switzerland) Ralph Boschung	Jenzer Motorsport	15	+ 7.140 s	1	10
4	11	(Sweden) Jimmy Eriksson	Koiranen GP	14	+ 8.076 s	5	8
5	12	(United Kingdom) Matt Parry	Koiranen GP	15	+ 8.528 s	6	6
6	15	(United Kingdom) Emil Bernstorff	Arden International	15	+ 9.279 s	7	4
7	27	(Italy) Luca Ghiotto	Trident	15	+ 9.656 s	5	2
8	5	(Germany) Marvin Kirchhöfer	ART Grand Prix	15	+ 12.103 s	8	1
9	21	(Switzerland) Matheo Tuscher	Jenzer Motorsport	15	+ 14.429 s	10	
10	28	(Colombia) Óscar Tunjo	Trident	15	+ 15.680 s	11	
11	4	(Mexico) Alfonso Celis Jr.	ART Grand Prix	15	+ 19.343 s	13	
12	7	(United Kingdom) Seb Morris	Status Grand Prix	15	+ 22.623 s	15	
13	24	(Spain) Álex Palou	Campos Racing	15	+ 22.996 s	24	
14	10	(Hong Kong) Adderly Fong	Koiranen GP	15	+ 23.663 s	12	
15	2	(United Kingdom) Jann Mardenborough	Carlin	15	+ 24.046 s	17	
16	16	(Poland) Aleksander Bosak	Arden International	15	+ 27.223 s	14	
17	26	(Poland) Artur Janosz	Trident	15	+ 28.413 s	9	
18	8	(Switzerland) Alex Fontana	Status Grand Prix	15	+ 28.703 s	19	
19	20	(Norway) Pål Varhaug	Jenzer Motorsport	15	+ 28.891 s	16	
20	9	(Thailand) Sandy Stuvik	Status Grand Prix	15	+ 30.377 s	22	
21	3	(Australia) Mitchell Gilbert	Carlin	15	+ 31.868 s	20	
22	23	(Kuwait) Zaid Ashkanani	Campos Racing	15	+ 36.829 s	21	
23	1	(Italy) Antonio Fuoco	Carlin	15	+ 37.730 s	18	
24	25	(Austria) Christopher Höher	Campos Racing	15	+ 41.260 s	23	
Fastest lap: Kevin Ceccon (Arden International) — 1:48.770 (on lap 7)

== See also ==
- 2015 British Grand Prix
- 2015 Silverstone GP2 Series round

Previous round: 2015 Red Bull Ring GP3 Series round	GP3 Series; 2015 season	Next round: 2015 Hungaroring GP3 Series round
Previous round: 2014 Silverstone GP3 Series round	Silverstone GP3 round	Next round: 2016 Silverstone GP3 Series round
