= 2016 Sepang GP3 Series round =

(Malaysia) 2016 Sepang GP3 round
Round details
- Round 8 of 9 rounds in the 2016 GP3 Series
- Layout of the Sepang International Circuit
- Location: Sepang International Circuit, Kuala Lumpur, Malaysia
- Course: Permanent racing facility 5.543 km (3.444 mi)

GP3 Series

Race 1
- Date: 1 October 2016
- Laps: 19

Pole position
Driver	(Monaco) Charles Leclerc	ART Grand Prix
- Time: 1:49.861

Podium
First	(Thailand) Alexander Albon	ART Grand Prix
Second	(United Kingdom) Jake Dennis	Arden International
Third	(Monaco) Charles Leclerc	ART Grand Prix

Fastest lap
Driver	(Thailand) Alexander Albon	ART Grand Prix
- Time: 1:51.934 (on lap 18)

Race 2
- Date: 2 October 2016
- Laps: 14

Podium
First	(United Kingdom) Jake Dennis	Arden International
Second	(Japan) Nirei Fukuzumi	ART Grand Prix
Third	(United Kingdom) Jack Aitken	Arden International

Fastest lap
Driver	(United Kingdom) Jake Dennis	Arden International
- Time: 1:51.971 (on lap 14)

The 2016 Sepang GP3 Series round was a GP3 Series motor race held on 1 and 2 October 2016 at the Sepang International Circuit in Malaysia. It was the penultimate round of the 2016 GP3 Series. The race weekend supported the 2016 Malaysian Grand Prix.

== Background ==
Alessio Lorandi made his debut for the Jenzer Motorsport outfit.

== Classification ==
=== Qualifying ===
Pos.	No.	Driver	Team	Time	Gap	Grid
1	1	(Monaco) Charles Leclerc	ART Grand Prix	1:49.861		1
2	3	(Thailand) Alexander Albon	ART Grand Prix	1:50.030	+0.169	2
3	4	(Netherlands) Nyck de Vries	ART Grand Prix	1:50.192	+0.331	3
4	11	(United Kingdom) Jack Aitken	Arden International	1:50.218	+0.357	4
EX	22	(Spain) Álex Palou	Campos Racing	1:50.371	+0.510	22^{1}
5	2	(Japan) Nirei Fukuzumi	ART Grand Prix	1:50.430	+0.569	5
6	20	(India) Arjun Maini	Jenzer Motorsport	1:50.503	+0.642	6
7	8	(Thailand) Sandy Stuvik	Trident	1:50.533	+0.672	7
8	9	(United Kingdom) Jake Dennis	Arden International	1:50.698	+0.837	8
9	23	(Netherlands) Steijn Schothorst	Campos Racing	1:50.717	+0.856	9
10	5	(Italy) Antonio Fuoco	Trident	1:50.733	+0.872	10
11	18	(Malaysia) Akash Nandy	Jenzer Motorsport	1:50.749	+0.888	11
12	14	(United Kingdom) Matt Parry	Koiranen GP	1:50.781	+0.920	12
13	26	(United States) Santino Ferrucci	DAMS	1:50.783	+0.922	13
14	19	(Italy) Alessio Lorandi	Jenzer Motorsport	1:50.831	+0.970	14
15	28	(Switzerland) Kevin Jörg	DAMS	1:51.047	+1.186	15
16	27	(United Kingdom) Jake Hughes	DAMS	1:51.084	+1.223	16
17	7	(France) Giuliano Alesi	Trident	1:51.184	+1.323	17
18	16	(Russia) Matevos Isaakyan	Koiranen GP	1:51.426	+1.565	18
19	10	(Colombia) Tatiana Calderón	Arden International	1:51.456	+1.595	19
20	24	(Russia) Konstantin Tereshchenko	Campos Racing	1:51.679	+1.818	20
21	6	(Poland) Artur Janosz	Trident	1:51.881	+2.020	21

Notes

- ^1 – Álex Palou was excluded from qualifying after his underfloor was found to be below the required dimensions. He would start the race from the back of the grid.

=== Race 1 ===
Pos.	No.	Driver	Team	Laps	Time/Retired	Grid	Points
1	3	(Thailand) Alexander Albon	ART Grand Prix	19	35:43.959	2	25 (2)
2	11	(United Kingdom) Jack Aitken	Arden International	19	+6.397	4	18
3	1	(Monaco) Charles Leclerc	ART Grand Prix	19	+7.166	1	15 (4)
4	20	(India) Arjun Maini	Jenzer Motorsport	19	+7.746	6	12
5	23	(Netherlands) Steijn Schothorst	Campos Racing	19	+18.680	9	10
6	9	(United Kingdom) Jake Dennis	Arden International	19	+19.544	8	8
7	2	(Japan) Nirei Fukuzumi	ART Grand Prix	19	+20.373	5	6
8	5	(Italy) Antonio Fuoco	Trident	19	+21.961	10	4
9	14	(United Kingdom) Matt Parry	Koiranen GP	19	+24.393	12	2
10	8	(Thailand) Sandy Stuvik	Trident	19	+25.325	7	1
11	19	(Italy) Alessio Lorandi	Jenzer Motorsport	19	+26.005	14	
12	28	(Switzerland) Kevin Jörg	DAMS	19	+26.949	15	
13	4	(Netherlands) Nyck de Vries	ART Grand Prix	19	+28.171	3	
14	22	(Spain) Álex Palou	Campos Racing	19	+33.273	22	
15	16	(Russia) Matevos Isaakyan	Koiranen GP	19	+35.555	18	
16	7	(France) Giuliano Alesi	Trident	19	+37.268	17	
17	24	(Russia) Konstantin Tereshchenko	Campos Racing	19	+48.279	20	
Ret	26	(United States) Santino Ferrucci	DAMS	11	Retired	13	
Ret	18	(Malaysia) Akash Nandy	Jenzer Motorsport	2	Retired	11	
Ret	6	(Poland) Artur Janosz	Trident	1	Retired	21	
Ret	10	(Colombia) Tatiana Calderón	Arden International	0	Retired	19	
Ret	27	(United Kingdom) Jake Hughes	DAMS	0	Retired	16	
Fastest lap: (Thailand) Alexander Albon (ART Grand Prix) – 1:51.934 (on lap 18)

=== Race 2 ===
Pos.	No.	Driver	Team	Laps	Time/Retired	Grid	Points
1	9	(United Kingdom) Jake Dennis	Arden International	14	26:21.781	3	15 (2)
2	2	(Japan) Nirei Fukuzumi	ART Grand Prix	14	+3.456	2	12
3	11	(United Kingdom) Jack Aitken	Arden International	14	+5.688	7	10
4	14	(United Kingdom) Matt Parry	Koiranen GP	14	+8.785	9	8
5	1	(Monaco) Charles Leclerc	ART Grand Prix	14	+9.140	6	6
6	4	(Netherlands) Nyck de Vries	ART Grand Prix	14	+9.982	13	4
7	20	(India) Arjun Maini	Jenzer Motorsport	14	+10.953	5	2
8	3	(Thailand) Alexander Albon	ART Grand Prix	14	+18.086	8	1
9	19	(Italy) Alessio Lorandi	Jenzer Motorsport	14	+20.376	11	
10	23	(Netherlands) Steijn Schothorst	Campos Racing	14	+22.023	4	
11	28	(Switzerland) Kevin Jörg	DAMS	14	+22.448	12	
12	27	(United Kingdom) Jake Hughes	DAMS	14	+23.229	22	
13	7	(France) Giuliano Alesi	Trident	14	+25.567	16	
14	16	(Russia) Matevos Isaakyan	Koiranen GP	14	+27.236	15	
15	10	(Colombia) Tatiana Calderón	Arden International	14	+27.886	21	
16	6	(Poland) Artur Janosz	Trident	14	+30.008	20	
17	24	(Russia) Konstantin Tereshchenko	Campos Racing	14	+30.217	17	
18	18	(Malaysia) Akash Nandy	Jenzer Motorsport	14	+30.606	19	
19	22	(Spain) Álex Palou	Campos Racing	14	+48.319	14	
20	8	(Thailand) Sandy Stuvik	Trident	14	+1:07.110	10	
Ret	5	(Italy) Antonio Fuoco	Trident	11	Retired	1	
Ret	26	(United States) Santino Ferrucci	DAMS	4	Retired	18	
Fastest lap: (United Kingdom) Jake Dennis (Arden International) – 1:51.971 (on lap 14)

== Standings after the round ==
Drivers' Championship standings

	Pos.	Driver	Points
	1	(Monaco) Charles Leclerc	202
1	2	(Thailand) Alexander Albon	173
1	3	(Italy) Antonio Fuoco	157
1	4	(United Kingdom) Jake Dennis	121
1	5	(United Kingdom) Jack Aitken	117

Teams' Championship standings

Pos.	Team	Points
1	(France) ART Grand Prix	539
2	(United Kingdom) Arden International	240
3	(Italy) Trident	170
4	(Finland) Koiranen GP	147
5	(France) DAMS	116

- Note: Only the top five positions are included for both sets of standings.

== See also ==
- 2016 Malaysian Grand Prix
- 2016 Sepang GP2 Series round

Previous round: 2016 Monza GP3 Series round	GP3 Series; 2016 season	Next round: 2016 Yas Marina GP3 Series round
Previous round: None	Sepang GP3 round	Next round: None
