= 2016 Spa-Francorchamps GP3 Series round =

(Belgium) 2016 Spa-Francorchamps GP3 round
Round details
- Round 6 of 9 rounds in the 2016 GP3 Series
- Layout of the Circuit de Spa-Francorchamps
- Location: Circuit de Spa-Francorchamps, Francorchamps, Belgium
- Course: Permanent racing facility 7.004 km (4.352 mi)
- Date: 27 August 2016

GP3 Series

Race 1
- Date: 27 August 2016
- Laps: 17

Pole position
Driver	(Monaco) Charles Leclerc	ART Grand Prix
- Time: 2:04.896

Podium
First	(Monaco) Charles Leclerc	ART Grand Prix
Second	(United Kingdom) Jake Dennis	Arden International
Third	(Netherlands) Nyck de Vries	ART Grand Prix

Fastest lap
Driver	(Monaco) Charles Leclerc	ART Grand Prix
- Time: 2:09.918 (on lap 5)

Race 2
- Date: 28 August 2016
- Laps: 13

Podium
First	(United Kingdom) Jack Aitken	Arden International
Second	(Italy) Antonio Fuoco	Trident
Third	(United States) Santino Ferrucci	DAMS

Fastest lap
Driver	(United Kingdom) Jack Aitken	Arden International
- Time: 2:09.435 (on lap 8)

The 2016 Spa-Francorchamps GP3 Series round was a GP3 Series motor race held on 27 and 28 August 2016 at the Circuit de Spa-Francorchamps in Belgium. It was the sixth round of the 2016 GP3 Series. The race weekend supported the 2016 Belgian Grand Prix.

== Background ==
Óscar Tunjo will take the third entry at Jenzer Motorsport to return to the category. Another driver change for this weekend was in the Koiranen GP camp, where Red Bull junior driver Niko Kari would be replacing Ralph Boschung.

== Classification ==
=== Qualifying ===
Charles Leclerc took his first pole position since the Red Bull Ring round with a time over three-tenths faster than his nearest rival, Hughes. Nyck de Vries took third, just under half a second slower than Leclerc.

Pos.	No.	Driver	Team	Time	Gap	Grid
1	1	(Monaco) Charles Leclerc	ART Grand Prix	2:04.896	–	1
2	27	(United Kingdom) Jake Hughes	DAMS	2:05.259	+0.363	2
3	4	(Netherlands) Nyck de Vries	ART Grand Prix	2:05.393	+0.497	3
4	5	(Italy) Antonio Fuoco	Trident	2:05.448	+0.552	4
5	28	(Switzerland) Kevin Jörg	DAMS	2:05.612	+0.716	5
6	14	(United Kingdom) Matt Parry	Koiranen GP	2:05.653	+0.765	6
7	20	(India) Arjun Maini	Jenzer Motorsport	2:05.661	+0.862	7
8	8	(Thailand) Sandy Stuvik	Trident	2:05.758	+0.862	8
9	26	(United States) Santino Ferrucci	DAMS	2:05.852	+0.956	9
10	22	(Spain) Álex Palou	Campos Racing	2:05.880	+0.984	10
11	2	(Japan) Nirei Fukuzumi	ART Grand Prix	2:06.012	+1.116	11
12	16	(Russia) Matevos Isaakyan	Koiranen GP	2:06.145	+1.249	12
13	9	(United Kingdom) Jake Dennis	Arden International	2:06.179	+1.283	13
14	11	(United Kingdom) Jack Aitken	Arden International	2:06.185	+1.289	14
15	23	(Netherlands) Steijn Schothorst	Campos Racing	2:06.201	+1.305	15
16	19	(Colombia) Óscar Tunjo	Jenzer Motorsport	2:06.282	+1.386	16
17	3	(Thailand) Alexander Albon	ART Grand Prix	2:06.421	+1.525	17
18	6	(Poland) Artur Janosz	Trident	2:06.531	+1.635	18
19	7	(France) Giuliano Alesi	Trident	2:06.740	+1.844	19
20	24	(Russia) Konstantin Tereshchenko	Campos Racing	2:06.769	+1.873	20
21	17	(Finland) Niko Kari	Koiranen GP	2:06.772	+1.876	21
22	10	(Colombia) Tatiana Calderón	Arden International	2:06.900	+2.004	22
23	18	(Malaysia) Akash Nandy	Jenzer Motorsport	2:07.086	+2.190	23

=== Race 1 ===
Charles Leclerc took another win to inch further in the championship, finishing 2.3 seconds ahead of Jake Dennis and 15.4 seconds ahead of teammate Nyck de Vries.

Pos.	No.	Driver	Team	Laps	Time/Retired	Grid	Points
1	1	(Monaco) Charles Leclerc	ART Grand Prix	17	40:06.695	1	25 (6)
2	9	(United Kingdom) Jake Dennis	Arden International	17	+2.305	13	18
3	4	(Netherlands) Nyck de Vries	ART Grand Prix	17	+15.402	3	15
4	5	(Italy) Antonio Fuoco	Trident	17	+19.427	4	12
5	11	(United Kingdom) Jack Aitken	Arden International	17	+19.837	14	10
6	23	(Netherlands) Steijn Schothorst	Campos Racing	17	+21.419	15	8
7	26	(United States) Santino Ferrucci	DAMS	17	+24.337	9	6
8	16	(Russia) Matevos Isaakyan	Koiranen GP	17	+28.856	12	4
9	3	(Thailand) Alexander Albon	ART Grand Prix	17	+30.076	17	2
10	7	(France) Giuliano Alesi	Trident	17	+31.045	19	1
11	28	(Switzerland) Kevin Jörg	DAMS	17	+39.185	5	
12	6	(Poland) Artur Janosz	Trident	17	+42.364	18	
13	22	(Spain) Álex Palou	Campos Racing	17	+48.122	10	
14	10	(Colombia) Tatiana Calderón	Arden International	17	+51.141^{1}	22	
15	19	(Colombia) Óscar Tunjo	Jenzer Motorsport	17	+1:09.185^{2}	16	
16	18	(Malaysia) Akash Nandy	Jenzer Motorsport	17	+1:15.690	23	
17	24	(Russia) Konstantin Tereshchenko	Campos Racing	17	+1:22.750^{3}	20	
Ret	8	(Thailand) Sandy Stuvik	Trident	13	Retired	8	
Ret	17	(Finland) Niko Kari	Koiranen GP	4	Retired	21	
Ret	2	(Japan) Nirei Fukuzumi	ART Grand Prix	1	Retired	11	
Ret	14	(United Kingdom) Matt Parry	Koiranen GP	0	Retired	6	
Ret	27	(United Kingdom) Jake Hughes	DAMS	0	Retired	2	
Ret	20	(India) Arjun Maini	Jenzer Motorsport	0	Retired	7	
Fastest lap: (Monaco) Charles Leclerc (ART Grand Prix) – 2:09.918 (on lap 5)

Notes
1. – Calderón was given a 10-second penalty for causing a collision with Niko Kari.
2. – Tunjo was given a 10-second penalty for a dangerous re-entry onto the circuit, causing a collision with Konstantin Tereshchenko.
3. – Tereshchenko was given a 10-second penalty for forcing Tunjo off the circuit.

=== Race 2 ===
Jack Aitken took his first GP3 win in a tight battle between himself and Antonio Fuoco. Haas F1 development driver, Santino Ferrucci, achieved his first podium, 5.8 seconds adrift of the leader.

Pos.	No.	Driver	Team	Laps	Time/Retired	Grid	Points
1	11	(United Kingdom) Jack Aitken	Arden International	13	31:56.599	4	15 (2)
2	5	(Italy) Antonio Fuoco	Trident	13	+1.769	5	12
3	26	(United States) Santino Ferrucci	DAMS	13	+5.820	2	10
4	16	(Russia) Matevos Isaakyan	Koiranen GP	13	+7.207	1	8
5	9	(United Kingdom) Jake Dennis	Arden International	13	+7.708	7	6
6	1	(Monaco) Charles Leclerc	ART Grand Prix	13	+8.436	8	4
7	23	(Netherlands) Steijn Schothorst	Campos Racing	13	+9.345	3	2
8	4	(Netherlands) Nyck de Vries	ART Grand Prix	13	+9.851	6	1
9	6	(Poland) Artur Janosz	Trident	13	+11.614	12	
10	3	(Thailand) Alexander Albon	ART Grand Prix	13	+12.363	9	
11	22	(Spain) Alex Palou	Campos Racing	13	+14.531	13	
12	7	(France) Giuliano Alesi	Trident	13	+15.919	10	
13	18	(Malaysia) Akash Nandy	Jenzer Motorsport	13	+16.579	16	
14	17	(Finland) Niko Kari	Koiranen GP	13	+17.591	19	
15	2	(Japan) Nirei Fukuzumi	ART Grand Prix	13	+23.275	20	
16	20	(India) Arjun Maini	Jenzer Motorsport	13	+25.372^{1}	23	
17	8	(Thailand) Sandy Stuvik	Trident	12	+1 Lap	18	
Ret	28	(Switzerland) Kevin Jörg	DAMS	8	Collision	11	
Ret	14	(United Kingdom) Matt Parry	Koiranen GP	5	Collision	21	
Ret	27	(United Kingdom) Jake Hughes	DAMS	5	Collision	22	
Ret	24	(Russia) Konstantin Tereshchenko	Campos Racing	2	Puncture	17	
Ret	10	(Colombia) Tatiana Calderón	Arden International	1	Accident	14	
Fastest lap: (United Kingdom) Jack Aitken (Arden International) – 2:09.435 (on lap 8)

Notes
1. – Maini was given a ten-second penalty after causing a collision with Alexander Albon.

== Standings after the round ==
Drivers' Championship standings

	Pos.	Driver	Points
	1	(Monaco) Charles Leclerc	161
2	2	(Italy) Antonio Fuoco	139
1	3	(Thailand) Alexander Albon	125
2	4	(Netherlands) Nyck de Vries	81
1	5	(United Kingdom) Matt Parry	70

Teams' Championship standings

	Pos.	Team	Points
	1	(France) ART Grand Prix	401
	2	(Italy) Trident	150
	3	(Finland) Koiranen GP	135
1	4	(United Kingdom) Arden International	129
1	5	(France) DAMS	99

- Note: Only the top five positions are included for both sets of standings.

== See also ==
- 2016 Belgian Grand Prix
- 2016 Spa-Francorchamps GP2 Series round

Previous round: 2016 Hockenheimring GP3 Series round	GP3 Series; 2016 season	Next round: 2016 Monza GP3 Series round
Previous round: 2015 Spa-Francorchamps GP3 Series round	Spa-Francorchamps GP3 round	Next round: 2017 Spa-Francorchamps GP3 Series round
