= 2016 Hockenheimring GP3 Series round =

(Germany) 2016 Hockenheimring GP3 round
Round details
- Round 5 of 9 rounds in the 2016 GP3 Series
- Layout of the Hockenheimring
- Location: Hockenheimring, Hockenheim, Germany
- Course: Permanent racing facility 4.574 km (2.842 mi)
- Date: 30 July 2016

GP3 Series

Race 1
- Date: 30 July 2016
- Laps: 24

Pole position
Driver	(Thailand) Alexander Albon	ART Grand Prix
- Time: 1:28.431

Podium
First	(Italy) Antonio Fuoco	Trident
Second	(Netherlands) Nyck de Vries	ART Grand Prix
Third	(United Kingdom) Matt Parry	Koiranen GP

Fastest lap
Driver	(Monaco) Charles Leclerc	ART Grand Prix
- Time: 1:31.703 (on lap 7)

Race 2
- Date: 31 July 2016
- Laps: 18

Podium
First	(United Kingdom) Jake Hughes	DAMS
Second	(United Kingdom) Jack Aitken	Arden International
Third	(Monaco) Charles Leclerc	ART Grand Prix

Fastest lap
Driver	(United Kingdom) Jake Hughes	DAMS
- Time: 1:31.464 (on lap 5)

The 2016 Hockenheimring GP3 Series round was a GP2 Series motor race held on 30 and 31 July 2016 at the Hockenheimring in Germany. It was the fiventh round of the 2016 GP3 Series. The race weekend supported the 2016 German Grand Prix.

== Classification ==
=== Qualifying ===
Alexander Albon secured his second pole position of the season with a time of 1:28.431 - marginally faster than that of Charles Leclerc, Jake Dennis and Nyck de Vries.

Pos.	No.	Driver	Team	Time	Gap	Grid
1	3	(Thailand) Alexander Albon	ART Grand Prix	1:28.431	–	1
2	1	(Monaco) Charles Leclerc	ART Grand Prix	1:28.509	+0.078	5 ^{1}
3	9	(United Kingdom) Jake Dennis	Arden International	1:28.518	+0.087	2
4	4	(Netherlands) Nyck de Vries	ART Grand Prix	1:28.524	+0.093	3
5	5	(Italy) Antonio Fuoco	Trident	1:28.618	+0.187	4
6	14	(United Kingdom) Matt Parry	Koiranen GP	1:28.638	+0.207	6
7	2	(Japan) Nirei Fukuzumi	ART Grand Prix	1:28.662	+0.231	7
8	22	(Spain) Álex Palou	Campos Racing	1:28.838	+0.407	8
9	23	(Netherlands) Steijn Schothorst	Campos Racing	1:28.918	+0.487	9
10	11	(United Kingdom) Jack Aitken	Arden International	1:28.935	+0.504	10
11	8	(Thailand) Sandy Stuvik	Trident	1:28.944	+0.513	11
12	27	(United Kingdom) Jake Hughes	DAMS	1:29.052	+0.621	12
13	20	(India) Arjun Maini	Jenzer Motorsport	1:29.076	+0.645	13
14	24	(Russia) Konstantin Tereshchenko	Campos Racing	1:29.107	+0.676	14
15	17	(Switzerland) Ralph Boschung	Koiranen GP	1:29.126	+0.695	15
16	7	(France) Giuliano Alesi	Trident	1:29.301	+0.870	16
17	26	(United States) Santino Ferrucci	DAMS	1:29.311	+0.880	17
18	6	(Poland) Artur Janosz	Trident	1:29.383	+0.952	18
19	28	(Switzerland) Kevin Jörg	DAMS	1:29.542	+1.111	19
20	16	(Russia) Matevos Isaakyan	Koiranen GP	1:29.665	+1.234	20
21	18	(Malaysia) Akash Nandy	Jenzer Motorsport	1:29.847	+1.416	21
22	10	(Colombia) Tatiana Calderón	Arden International	1:29.895	+1.464	22

=== Race 1 ===
Antonio Fuoco took his second win of the year. de Vries achieved second and Matt Parry in third.

Pos.	No.	Driver	Team	Laps	Time/Retired	Grid	Points
1	5	(Italy) Antonio Fuoco	Trident	23	38:25.683	4	25
2	4	(Netherlands) Nyck de Vries	ART Grand Prix	23	+5.988	3	18
3	14	(United Kingdom) Matt Parry	Koiranen GP	23	+6.836	6	15
4	3	(Thailand) Alexander Albon	ART Grand Prix	23	+7.973	1	12 (4)
5	1	(Monaco) Charles Leclerc	ART Grand Prix	23	+10.519	5	10 (2)
6	11	(United Kingdom) Jack Aitken	Arden International	23	+12.291	6	8
7	20	(India) Arjun Maini	Jenzer Motorsport	23	+14.828	13	6
8	27	(United Kingdom) Jake Hughes	Arden International	23	+18.246	12	4
9	26	(United States) Santino Ferrucci	DAMS	23	+20.065	16	2
10	10	(Colombia) Tatiana Calderón	Arden International	23	+20.206	22	1
11	6	(Poland) Artur Janosz	Trident	23	+23.964	18	
12	9	(United Kingdom) Jake Dennis	Arden International	23	+25.332	2	
13	18	(Malaysia) Akash Nandy	Jenzer Motorsport	23	+25.467	21	
14	28	(Switzerland) Kevin Jörg	DAMS	23	+37.076	19	
15	17	(Switzerland) Ralph Boschung	Koiranen GP	23	+1:01.860	14	
16	22	(Spain) Álex Palou	Campos Racing	23	+1:13.841	8	
Ret	8	(Thailand) Sandy Stuvik	Trident	14	Retired	11	
Ret	23	(Netherlands) Steijn Schothorst	Campos Racing	4	Retired	9	
Ret	2	(Japan) Nirei Fukuzumi	ART Grand Prix	3	Retired	7	
Ret	16	(Russia) Matevos Isaakyan	Koiranen GP	3	Retired	20	
Ret	24	(Russia) Konstantin Tereshchenko	Campos Racing	2	Retired	17	
Ret	7	(France) Giuliano Alesi	Trident	0	Retired	15	
Fastest lap: (Monaco) Charles Leclerc (ART Grand Prix) – 1:31.703 (on lap 7)

=== Race 2 ===
Jake Hughes took his first win of the season, with Jack Aitken in second and Charles Leclerc in third. Championship leader Alexander Albon retired after an accident with Ralph Boschung in the opening laps which subsequently promoted Leclerc into the lead of the championship.

Pos.	No.	Driver	Team	Laps	Time/Retired	Grid	Points
1	27	(United Kingdom) Jake Hughes	DAMS	18	29:51.410	1	15 (2)
2	11	(United Kingdom) Jack Aitken	Arden International	18	+2.602	3	12
3	1	(Monaco) Charles Leclerc	ART Grand Prix	18	+5.884	4	10
4	26	(United States) Santino Ferrucci	DAMS	18	+6.835	9	8
5	20	(India) Arjun Maini	Jenzer Motorsport	18	+7.718	2	6
6	9	(United Kingdom) Jake Dennis	Arden International	18	+8.935	12	4
7	14	(United Kingdom) Matt Parry	Koiranen GP	18	+14.441	6	2
8	4	(Netherlands) Nyck de Vries	ART Grand Prix	18	+16.694	12	1
9	10	(Colombia) Tatiana Calderón	Arden International	18	+16.940	10	
10	28	(Switzerland) Kevin Jörg	DAMS	18	+17.928	14	
11	2	(Japan) Nirei Fukuzumi	ART Grand Prix	18	+18.562	19	
12	8	(Thailand) Sandy Stuvik	Trident	18	+27.796	17	
13	16	(Russia) Matevos Isaakyan	Koiranen GP	18	+28.852	20	
14	7	(France) Giuliano Alesi	Trident	18	+29.197	22	
15	24	(Russia) Konstantin Tereshchenko	Campos Racing	18	+29.641	21	
16	18	(Malaysia) Akash Nandy	Jenzer Motorsport	18	+29.928	13	
17	23	(Netherlands) Steijn Schothorst	Campos Racing	18	+30.344	18	
18	5	(Italy) Antonio Fuoco	Trident	17	+1 Lap	8	
19	22	(Spain) Álex Palou	Campos Racing	16	+2 Laps	16	
Ret	17	(Switzerland) Ralph Boschung	Koiranen GP	1	Collision	15	
Ret	3	(Thailand) Alexander Albon	ART Grand Prix	1	Collision	5	
Ret	6	(Poland) Artur Janosz	Trident	0	Front Wing/Off Course	11	
Fastest lap: (United Kingdom) Jake Hughes (DAMS) – 1:31.464 (on lap 5)

== Standings after the round ==
Drivers' Championship standings

	Pos	Driver	Points
1	1	(Monaco) Charles Leclerc	126
1	2	(Thailand) Alexander Albon	123
	3	(Italy) Antonio Fuoco	115
	4	(United Kingdom) Matt Parry	70
1	5	(Netherlands) Nyck de Vries	65

Teams' Championship standings

	Pos	Team	Points
	1	(France) ART Grand Prix	349
1	2	(Italy) Trident	125
1	3	(Finland) Koiranen GP	123
1	4	(France) DAMS	83
1	5	(United Kingdom) Arden International	78

- Note: Only the top five positions are included for both sets of standings.

== See also ==
- 2016 German Grand Prix
- 2016 Hockenheimring GP2 Series round

Previous round: 2016 Hungaroring GP3 Series round	GP3 Series; 2016 season	Next round: 2016 Spa-Francorchamps GP3 Series round
Previous round: 2014 Hockenheimring GP3 Series round	Hockenheimring GP3 round	Next round: None
