= 2016 Yas Marina GP3 Series round =

(United Arab Emirates) 2016 Yas Marina GP3 round
Round details
- Round 9 of 9 rounds in the 2016 GP3 Series
- Layout of the Yas Marina Circuit
- Location: Yas Marina Circuit, Abu Dhabi, United Arab Emirates
- Course: Permanent racing facility 5.554 km (3.451 mi)

GP3 Series

Race 1
- Date: 26 November 2016
- Laps: 18

Pole position
Driver	(Thailand) Alexander Albon	ART Grand Prix
- Time: 1:55.274

Podium
First	(Netherlands) Nyck de Vries	ART Grand Prix
Second	(United Kingdom) Jake Dennis	Arden International
Third	(United Kingdom) Jack Aitken	Arden International

Fastest lap
Driver	(United Kingdom) Jack Aitken	Arden International
- Time: 2:01.350 (on lap 2)

Race 2
- Date: 27 November 2016
- Laps: 14

Podium
First	(United Kingdom) Jake Hughes	DAMS
Second	(United Kingdom) Jack Aitken	Arden International
Third	(Japan) Nirei Fukuzumi	ART Grand Prix

Fastest lap
Driver	(United Kingdom) Jake Dennis	Arden International
- Time: 1:59.847 (on lap 5)

The 2016 Yas Marina GP3 Series round was a GP3 Series motor race held on 26 and 27 November 2016 at the Yas Marina Circuit in the United Arab Emirates. It was the final round of the 2016 GP3 Series. The race weekend supported the 2016 Abu Dhabi Grand Prix.

== Classification ==
=== Qualifying ===
Pos.	No.	Driver	Team	Time	Gap	Grid
1	3	(Thailand) Alexander Albon	ART Grand Prix	1:55.274		1
2	9	(United Kingdom) Jake Dennis	Arden International	1:55.514	+0.240	2
3	11	(United Kingdom) Jack Aitken	Arden International	1:55.604	+0.330	3
4	4	(Netherlands) Nyck de Vries	ART Grand Prix	1:55.629	+0.355	4
5	1	(Monaco) Charles Leclerc	ART Grand Prix	1:55.660	+0.386	5
6	26	(United States) Santino Ferrucci	DAMS	1:55.678	+0.404	6
7	20	(India) Arjun Maini	Jenzer Motorsport	1:55.683	+0.409	7
8	28	(Switzerland) Kevin Jörg	DAMS	1:55.892	+0.618	8
9	23	(Netherlands) Steijn Schothorst	Campos Racing	1:55.981	+0.707	9
10	2	(Japan) Nirei Fukuzumi	ART Grand Prix	1:56.094	+0.820	10
11	5	(Italy) Antonio Fuoco	Trident	1:56.145	+0.871	11
12	6	(Poland) Artur Janosz	Trident	1:56.154	+0.880	12
13	22	(Spain) Álex Palou	Campos Racing	1:56.155	+0.881	13
14	14	(United Kingdom) Matt Parry	Koiranen GP	1:56.256	+0.982	14
15	7	(France) Giuliano Alesi	Trident	1:56.361	+1.087	15
16	24	(Russia) Konstantin Tereshchenko	Campos Racing	1:56.563	+1.289	16
17	8	(Thailand) Sandy Stuvik	Trident	1:56.570	+1.296	17
18	10	(Colombia) Tatiana Calderón	Arden International	1:56.729	+1.455	18
19	18	(Malaysia) Akash Nandy	Jenzer Motorsport	1:56.732	+1.458	19
20	27	(United Kingdom) Jake Hughes	DAMS	1:56.995	+1.721	22
21	16	(Russia) Matevos Isaakyan	Koiranen GP	1:57.513	+2.239	20
–	19	(Italy) Alessio Lorandi	Jenzer Motorsport	no time		21

=== Race 1 ===
Pos.	No.	Driver	Team	Laps	Time/Retired	Grid	Points
1	4	(Netherlands) Nyck de Vries	ART Grand Prix	18	38:06.651	4	25
2	9	(United Kingdom) Jake Dennis	Arden International	18	+1.012	2	18
3	11	(United Kingdom) Jack Aitken	Arden International	18	+3.881	3	15 (2)
4	28	(Switzerland) Kevin Jörg	DAMS	18	+9.601	8	12
5	2	(Japan) Nirei Fukuzumi	ART Grand Prix	18	+10.618	10	10
6	23	(Netherlands) Steijn Schothorst	Campos Racing	18	+14.369	9	8
7	27	(United Kingdom) Jake Hughes	DAMS	18	+15.225	22	6
8	24	(Russia) Konstantin Tereshchenko	Campos Racing	18	+17.292	16	4
9	26	(United States) Santino Ferrucci	DAMS	18	+18.990	6	2
10	22	(Spain) Álex Palou	Campos Racing	18	+20.776	13	1
11	7	(France) Giuliano Alesi	Trident	18	+23.009	15	
12	19	(Italy) Alessio Lorandi	Jenzer Motorsport	18	+26.262	21	
13	18	(Malaysia) Akash Nandy	Jenzer Motorsport	18	+26.335	19	
14	20	(India) Arjun Maini	Jenzer Motorsport	18	+27.325	7	
15	8	(Thailand) Sandy Stuvik	Trident	18	+32.912	17	
16	5	(Italy) Antonio Fuoco	Trident	18	+54.535	11	
Ret	1	(Monaco) Charles Leclerc	ART Grand Prix	13	Spun off	5	
Ret	16	(Russia) Matevos Isaakyan	Koiranen GP	12	Retired	20	
Ret	3	(Thailand) Alexander Albon	ART Grand Prix	10	Collision	1	(4)
Ret	10	(Colombia) Tatiana Calderón	Arden International	6	Collision	18	
Ret	14	(United Kingdom) Matt Parry	Koiranen GP	3	Failure	14	
Ret	6	(Poland) Artur Janosz	Trident	2	Accident	12	
Fastest lap: (United Kingdom) Jack Aitken (Arden International) – 2:01.350 (on lap 2)

=== Race 2 ===
Pos.	No.	Driver	Team	Laps	Time/Retired	Grid	Points
1	27	(United Kingdom) Jake Hughes	DAMS	14	30:21.199	2	15
2	11	(United Kingdom) Jack Aitken	Arden International	14	+2.825	6	12
3	2	(Japan) Nirei Fukuzumi	ART Grand Prix	14	+7.191	4	10
4	9	(United Kingdom) Jake Dennis	Arden International	14	+7.471	7	8 (2)
5	22	(Spain) Álex Palou	Campos Racing	14	+8.747	10	6
6	24	(Russia) Konstantin Tereshchenko	Campos Racing	14	+8.774	1	4
7	23	(Netherlands) Steijn Schothorst	Campos Racing	14	+9.158	3	2
8	28	(Switzerland) Kevin Jörg	DAMS	14	+12.846	5	1
9	1	(Monaco) Charles Leclerc	ART Grand Prix	14	+14.035	17	
10	7	(France) Giuliano Alesi	Trident	14	+15.909	11	
11	4	(Netherlands) Nyck de Vries	ART Grand Prix	14	+17.639	8	
12	14	(United Kingdom) Matt Parry	Koiranen GP	14	+19.946	21	
13	18	(Malaysia) Akash Nandy	Jenzer Motorsport	14	+20.467	13	
14	20	(India) Arjun Maini	Jenzer Motorsport	14	+20.925	14	
15	26	(United States) Santino Ferrucci	DAMS	14	+21.153	9	
16	16	(Russia) Matevos Isaakyan	Koiranen GP	14	+23.085	18	
17	5	(Italy) Antonio Fuoco	Trident	14	+23.266	16	
18	8	(Thailand) Sandy Stuvik	Trident	14	+24.506	15	
19	6	(Poland) Artur Janosz	Trident	14	+35.455	22	
20	19	(Italy) Alessio Lorandi	Jenzer Motorsport	14	+1:04.408	12	
Ret	10	(Colombia) Tatiana Calderón	Arden International	0	Collision damage	20	
Ret	3	(Thailand) Alexander Albon	ART Grand Prix	0	Accident	19	
Fastest lap: (United Kingdom) Jake Dennis (Arden International) – 1:59.847 (on lap 5)

== Standings after the round ==
Drivers' Championship standings

Pos.	Driver	Points
1	(Monaco) Charles Leclerc	202
2	(Thailand) Alexander Albon	177
3	(Italy) Antonio Fuoco	157
4	(United Kingdom) Jake Dennis	149
5	(United Kingdom) Jack Aitken	146

Teams' Championship standings

	Pos.	Team	Points
	1	(France) ART Grand Prix	588
	2	(United Kingdom) Arden International	297
	3	(Italy) Trident	170
1	4	(France) DAMS	152
1	5	(Finland) Koiranen GP	147

- Note: Only the top five positions are included for both sets of standings.

== See also ==
- 2016 Abu Dhabi Grand Prix
- 2016 Yas Marina GP2 Series round

Previous round: 2016 Sepang GP3 Series round	GP3 Series; 2016 season	Next round: 2017 Barcelona GP3 Series round
Previous round: 2015 Yas Marina GP3 Series round	Yas Marina GP3 round	Next round: 2017 Yas Marina GP3 Series round
