= 2016 Hungaroring GP3 Series round =

Motor racing competition

(Hungary) 2016 Hungaroring GP3 round
Round details
- Round 4 of 9 rounds in the 2016 GP3 Series
- Layout of the Hungaroring
- Location: Hungaroring, Mogyoród, Pest, Hungary
- Course: Permanent racing facility 4.381 km (2.722 mi)

GP3 Series

Race 1
- Date: 23 July 2016
- Laps: 22

Pole position
Driver	(Netherlands) Nyck de Vries	ART Grand Prix
- Time: 1:32.979

Podium
First	(United Kingdom) Matt Parry	Koiranen GP
Second	(Italy) Antonio Fuoco	Trident
Third	(United Kingdom) Jake Dennis	Arden International

Fastest lap
Driver	(United Kingdom) Jake Dennis	Arden International
- Time: 1:36.407 (on lap 21)

Race 2
- Date: 24 July 2016
- Laps: 15

Podium
First	(Thailand) Alexander Albon	ART Grand Prix
Second	(India) Arjun Maini	Jenzer Motorsport
Third	(Monaco) Charles Leclerc	ART Grand Prix

Fastest lap
Driver	(Thailand) Alexander Albon	ART Grand Prix
- Time: 1:35.140 (on lap 16)

The 2016 Hungaroring GP3 Series round was a GP3 Series motor race held on 23 and 24 July 2016 at the Hungaroring in Mogyoród, Pest, Hungary. It was the fourth round of the 2016 GP3 Series. The race weekend supported the 2016 Hungarian Grand Prix.

== Background ==
Richard Gonda returned to the GP3 grid after missing the third round at Silverstone.

== Classification ==
=== Qualifying ===
Nyck de Vries secured his first pole position of the season with a time of 1:32.979 - nearly half a second faster than that of second-placed driver, Matt Parry. Antonio Fuoco achieved third place, only marginally less than half a second off the pace of de Vries.

Pos.	No.	Driver	Team	Time	Gap	Grid
1	4	(Netherlands) Nyck de Vries	ART Grand Prix	1:32.979	–	1
2	14	(United Kingdom) Matt Parry	Koiranen GP	1:33.464	+0.485	2
3	5	(Italy) Antonio Fuoco	Trident	1:33.478	+0.499	3
4	9	(United Kingdom) Jake Dennis	Arden International	1:33.548	+0.569	4
5	2	(Japan) Nirei Fukuzumi	ART Grand Prix	1:33.660	+0.681	5
6	1	(Monaco) Charles Leclerc	ART Grand Prix	1:33.672	+0.693	6
7	11	(United Kingdom) Jack Aitken	Arden International	1:33.682	+0.703	7
8	3	(Thailand) Alexander Albon	ART Grand Prix	1:33.866	+0.887	8
9	20	(India) Arjun Maini	Jenzer Motorsport	1:33.874	+0.895	9
10	17	(Switzerland) Ralph Boschung	Koiranen GP	1:33.892	+0.913	10
11	28	(Switzerland) Kevin Jörg	DAMS	1:33.974	+0.995	11
12	22	(Spain) Álex Palou	Campos Racing	1:34.017	+1.038	12
13	16	(Russia) Matevos Isaakyan	Koiranen GP	1:34.053	+1.074	13
14	6	(Poland) Artur Janosz	Trident	1:34.056	+1.077	14
15	19	(Slovakia) Richard Gonda	Jenzer Motorsport	1:34.114	+1.135	15
16	7	(France) Giuliano Alesi	Trident	1:34.177	+1.198	16
17	10	(Colombia) Tatiana Calderón	Arden International	1:34.225	+1.246	17
18	24	(Russia) Konstantin Tereshchenko	Campos Racing	1:34.233	+1.254	18
19	27	(United Kingdom) Jake Hughes	DAMS	1:34.322	+1.343	19
20	18	(Malaysia) Akash Nandy	Jenzer Motorsport	1:34.462	+1.483	20
21	8	(Thailand) Sandy Stuvik	Trident	1:34.520	+1.541	21
22	26	(United States) Santino Ferrucci	DAMS	1:34.609	+1.630	22
23	23	(Netherlands) Steijn Schothorst	Campos Racing	1:34.678	+1.699	23

=== Race 1 ===
Matt Parry took his first GP3 win and Koiranen GP's second for the year. Fuoco achieved second and Jake Dennis in third.

Pos.	No.	Driver	Team	Laps	Time/Retired	Grid	Points
1	14	(United Kingdom) Matt Parry	Koiranen GP	22	35:49.008	2	25
2	5	(Italy) Antonio Fuoco	Trident	22	+3.283	3	18
3	9	(United Kingdom) Jake Dennis	Arden International	22	+4.208	4	15 (2)
4	2	(Japan) Nirei Fukuzumi	ART Grand Prix	22	+5.875	5	12
5	17	(Switzerland) Ralph Boschung	Koiranen GP	22	+6.444	10	10
6	1	(Monaco) Charles Leclerc	ART Grand Prix	22	+9.762	6	8
7	3	(Thailand) Alexander Albon	ART Grand Prix	22	+10.425	8	6
8	20	(India) Arjun Maini	Jenzer Motorsport	22	+13.777	9	4
9	11	(United Kingdom) Jack Aitken	Arden International	22	+14.226	7	2
10	28	(Switzerland) Kevin Jörg	DAMS	22	+14.977	11	1
11	22	(Spain) Álex Palou	Campos Racing	22	+18.728	12	
12	16	(Russia) Matevos Isaakyan	Koiranen GP	22	+19.943	13	
13	19	(Slovakia) Richard Gonda	Jenzer Motorsport	22	+20.320	15	
14	6	(Poland) Artur Janosz	Trident	22	+20.914	14	
15	26	(United States) Santino Ferrucci	DAMS	22	+22.111	22	
16	24	(Russia) Konstantin Tereshchenko	Campos Racing	22	+23.244	18	
17	18	(Malaysia) Akash Nandy	Jenzer Motorsport	22	+23.790	20	
18	8	(Thailand) Sandy Stuvik	Trident	22	+25.665	21	
19	7	(France) Giuliano Alesi	Trident	22	+26.571	16	
20	4	(Netherlands) Nyck de Vries	ART Grand Prix	22	+26.885	1	(4)
21	10	(Colombia) Tatiana Calderón	Arden International	22	+27.914	17	
22	23	(Netherlands) Steijn Schothorst	Campos Racing	22	+28.312	23	
23	27	(United Kingdom) Jake Hughes	DAMS	22	+43.965	19	
Fastest lap: (United Kingdom) Jake Dennis (Arden International) – 1:36.407 (on lap 21)

=== Race 2 ===
Alexander Albon took his third win of the season, extending his lead in the championship over teammate, Leclerc. Arjun Maini achieved second place in his fourth outing with the Jenzer Motorsport team, whilst Leclerc came through in third place.

Pos.	No.	Driver	Team	Laps	Time/Retired	Grid	Points
1	3	(Thailand) Alexander Albon	ART Grand Prix	17	30:01.514	2	15 (2)
2	20	(India) Arjun Maini	Jenzer Motorsport	17	+3.365	1	12
3	1	(Monaco) Charles Leclerc	ART Grand Prix	17	+4.363	3	10
4	2	(Japan) Nirei Fukuzumi	ART Grand Prix	17	+6.955	5	8
5	14	(United Kingdom) Matt Parry	Koiranen GP	17	+8.848	8	6
6	11	(United Kingdom) Jack Aitken	Arden International	17	+5.908^{1}	9	4
7	9	(United Kingdom) Jake Dennis	Arden International	17	+13.635	6	2
8	16	(Russia) Matevos Isaakyan	Koiranen GP	17	+14.600	12	1
9	26	(Switzerland) Kevin Jörg	DAMS	17	+15.820	10	
10	5	(Italy) Antonio Fuoco	Trident	17	+16.562	7	
11	26	(United States) Santino Ferrucci	DAMS	17	+18.051	15	
12	6	(Poland) Artur Janosz	Trident	17	+19.330	14	
13	4	(Netherlands) Nyck de Vries	ART Grand Prix	17	+20.150	20	
14	22	(Spain) Álex Palou	Campos Racing	17	+22.892	11	
15	19	(Slovakia) Richard Gonda	Jenzer Motorsport	17	+23.631	13	
16	7	(France) Giuliano Alesi	Trident	17	+24.330	19	
17	24	(Russia) Konstantin Tereshchenko	Campos Racing	17	+27.348	16	
18	8	(Thailand) Sandy Stuvik	Trident	17	+28.354	18	
19	27	(United Kingdom) Jake Hughes	DAMS	17	+28.676	23	
20	23	(Netherlands) Steijn Schothorst	Campos Racing	17	+29.312	22	
21	10	(Colombia) Tatiana Calderón	Arden International	17	+30.151	21	
Ret	18	(Malaysia) Akash Nandy	Jenzer Motorsport	0	Accident	17	
Fastest lap: (Thailand) Alexander Albon (ART Grand Prix) – 1:35.140 (on lap 16)

== Standings after the round ==
Drivers' Championship standings

	Pos	Driver	Points
1	1	(Thailand) Alexander Albon	107
1	2	(Monaco) Charles Leclerc	104
	3	(Italy) Antonio Fuoco	90
4	4	(United Kingdom) Matt Parry	53
	5	(Switzerland) Ralph Boschung	48

Teams' Championship standings

	Pos	Team	Points
	1	(France) ART Grand Prix	292
1	2	(Finland) Koiranen GP	106
1	3	(Italy) Trident	100
1	4	(United Kingdom) Arden International	53
1	5	(France) DAMS	52

- Note: Only the top five positions are included for both sets of standings.

== See also ==
- 2016 Hungarian Grand Prix
- 2016 Hungaroring GP2 Series round

Previous round: 2016 Silverstone GP3 Series round	GP3 Series; 2016 season	Next round: 2016 Hockenheimring GP3 Series round
Previous round: 2015 Hungaroring GP3 Series round	Hungaroring GP3 round	Next round: 2017 Budapest GP3 Series round
