= 2016 Monza GP3 Series round =

Motor race competition

(Italy) 2016 Monza GP3 round
Round details
- Round 7 of 9 rounds in the 2016 GP3 Series
- Layout of the Autodromo Nazionale Monza
- Location: Autodromo Nazionale Monza, Monza, Italy
- Course: Permanent racing facility 5.793 km (3.6 mi)
- Date: 3 September 2016

GP3 Series

Race 1
- Date: 3 September 2016
- Laps: 22

Pole position
Driver	(Monaco) Charles Leclerc	ART Grand Prix
- Time: 1:38.546

Podium
First	(United Kingdom) Jake Dennis	Arden International
Second	(United Kingdom) Jack Aitken	Arden International
Third	(United Kingdom) Jake Hughes	DAMS

Fastest lap
Driver	(United Kingdom) Jake Hughes	DAMS
- Time: 1:40.706 (on lap 18)

Race 2
- Date: 4 September 2016
- Laps: 17

Podium
First	(Netherlands) Nyck de Vries	ART Grand Prix
Second	(Thailand) Alexander Albon	ART Grand Prix
Third	(Italy) Antonio Fuoco	Trident

Fastest lap
Driver	(Netherlands) Nyck de Vries	ART Grand Prix
- Time: 1:40.766 (on lap 8)

The 2016 Monza GP3 Series round was a GP3 Series motor race held on 3 and 4 September 2016 at the Autodromo Nazionale Monza in Italy. It was the seventh round of the 2016 GP3 Series. The race weekend supported the 2016 Italian Grand Prix.

== Background ==
Ralph Boschung would return to the category after sitting out the previous round in Belgium due to financial difficulties. As well as this, Óscar Tunjo would not return to the category for this round after making his return in Belgium.

== Classification ==
=== Qualifying ===
Charles Leclerc took his third pole of the year and ART Grand Prix's sixth straight of the year, followed by the Arden International duo of Jake Dennis and Jack Aitken.

Pos.	No.	Driver	Team	Time	Gap	Grid
1	1	(Monaco) Charles Leclerc	ART Grand Prix	1:38.546	–	1
2	9	(United Kingdom) Jake Dennis	Arden International	1:38.712	+0.166	2
3	11	(United Kingdom) Jack Aitken	Arden International	1:38.729	+0.183	3
4	3	(Thailand) Alexander Albon	ART Grand Prix	1:38.847	+0.301	4
5	27	(United Kingdom) Jake Hughes	DAMS	1:38.850	+0.304	5
6	28	(Switzerland) Kevin Jörg	DAMS	1:38.872	+0.326	6
7	2	(Japan) Nirei Fukuzumi	ART Grand Prix	1:38.878	+0.332	7
8	5	(Italy) Antonio Fuoco	Trident	1:38.879	+0.333	8
9	4	(Netherlands) Nyck de Vries	ART Grand Prix	1:38.885	+0.339	9
10	17	(Switzerland) Ralph Boschung	Koiranen GP	1:38.945	+0.399	10
11	22	(Spain) Álex Palou	Campos Racing	1:39.045	+0.499	11
12	8	(Thailand) Sandy Stuvik	Trident	1:39.084	+0.538	12
13	16	(Russia) Matevos Isaakyan	Koiranen GP	1:39.255	+0.709	13
14	26	(United States) Santino Ferrucci	DAMS	1:39.268	+0.722	14
15	10	(Colombia) Tatiana Calderón	Arden International	1:39.286	+0.740	15
16	7	(France) Giuliano Alesi	Trident	1:39.377	+0.831	16
17	14	(United Kingdom) Matt Parry	Koiranen GP	1:39.430	+0.884	17
18	23	(Netherlands) Steijn Schothorst	Campos Racing	1:39.439	+0.893	18
19	20	(India) Arjun Maini	Jenzer Motorsport	1:39.535	+0.989	19
20	18	(Malaysia) Akash Nandy	Jenzer Motorsport	1:39.558	+1.012	20
21	6	(Poland) Artur Janosz	Trident	1:39.869	+1.323	PL^{1}
22	24	(Russia) Konstantin Tereshchenko	Campos Racing	1:40.216	+1.670	21

Notes

1. – Janosz was issued a three-place grid penalty after causing a collision with Arjun Maini. Seeing as how he could not serve his penalty in full, he started the feature race from the pitlane.

=== Race 1 ===
It was a British lockout with Jake Dennis taking the victory, Jack Aitken achieving second and Jake Hughes third, as well as the fastest lap of the race.

Pos.	No.	Driver	Team	Laps	Time/Retired	Grid	Points
1	9	(United Kingdom) Jake Dennis	Arden International	22	38:06.844	2	25
2	11	(United Kingdom) Jack Aitken	Arden International	22	+1.987	3	18
3	27	(United Kingdom) Jake Hughes	DAMS	22	+2.532	8	15 (2)
4	1	(Monaco) Charles Leclerc	ART Grand Prix	22	+7.139	1	12 (4)
5	2	(Japan) Nirei Fukuzumi	ART Grand Prix	22	+7.561	6	10
6	3	(Thailand) Alexander Albon	ART Grand Prix	22	+8.171	4	8
7	4	(Netherlands) Nyck de Vries	ART Grand Prix	22	+8.343	9	6
8	5	(Italy) Antonio Fuoco	Trident	22	+16.207	7	4
9	14	(United Kingdom) Matt Parry	Koiranen GP	22	+16.607	17	2
10	10	(Colombia) Tatiana Calderón	Arden International	22	+17.003	15	1
11	22	(Spain) Alex Palou	Campos Racing	22	+19.202	10	
12	8	(Thailand) Sandy Stuvik	Trident	22	+20.444	11	
13	23	(Netherlands) Steijn Schothorst	Campos Racing	22	+22.179	18	
14	20	(India) Arjun Maini	Jenzer Motorsport	22	+25.076	19	
15	18	(Malaysia) Akash Nandy	Jenzer Motorsport	22	+27.804	20	
16	6	(Poland) Artur Janosz	Trident	22	+30.365	22	
17	24	(Russia) Konstantin Tereshchenko	Campos Racing	22	+32.963	21	
18	17	(Switzerland) Ralph Boschung	Koiranen GP	22	+34.813	13	
19	26	(United States) Santino Ferrucci	DAMS	21	+1 Lap	14	
NC	28	(Switzerland) Kevin Jörg	DAMS	18	+4 Laps	5	
Ret	16	(Russia) Matevos Isaakyan	Koiranen GP	4	Retired	12	
DNS	7	(France) Giuliano Alesi	Trident	0	Did not start	16	
Fastest lap: (United Kingdom) Jake Hughes (DAMS) – 1:40.706 (on lap 18)

=== Race 2 ===
Nyck de Vries took his first GP3 victory to put ART Grand Prix beyond reach in the GP3 Teams Championship. Team-mate Albon took second place whilst Antonio Fuoco achieved third in his home race.

Pos.	No.	Driver	Team	Laps	Time/Retired	Grid	Points
1	4	(Netherlands) Nyck de Vries	ART Grand Prix	17	30:24.854	2	15 (2)
2	3	(Thailand) Alexander Albon	ART Grand Prix	17	+1.741	3	12
3	5	(Italy) Antonio Fuoco	Trident	17	+6.382	1	10
4	9	(United Kingdom) Jake Dennis	Arden International	17	+7.139	8	8
5	11	(United Kingdom) Jack Aitken	Arden International	17	+8.331	2	6
6	20	(India) Arjun Maini	Jenzer Motorsport	17	+11.991	14	4
7	22	(Spain) Alex Palou	Campos Racing	17	+12.264	11	2
8	6	(Poland) Artur Janosz	Trident	17	+12.504	16	1
9	17	(Switzerland) Ralph Boschung	Koiranen GP	17	+12.504	18	
10	27	(United Kingdom) Jake Hughes	DAMS	17	+13.910	3	
11	26	(United States) Santino Ferrucci	DAMS	17	+14.716	19	
12	28	(Switzerland) Kevin Jörg	DAMS	17	+16.886	20	
13	23	(Netherlands) Steijn Schothorst	Campos Racing	17	+17.561	13	
14	24	(Russia) Konstantin Tereshchenko	Campos Racing	17	+20.609	17	
15	8	(Thailand) Sandy Stuvik	Trident	17	+20.958	20	
16	10	(Colombia) Tatiana Calderón	Arden International	17	+21.273	10	
17	14	(United Kingdom) Matt Parry	Koiranen GP	17	+22.022	9	
18	18	(Malaysia) Akash Nandy	Jenzer Motorsport	17	+1:03.571	15	
19	7	(France) Giuliano Alesi	Trident	16	+1 Lap	22	
Ret	16	(Russia) Matevos Isaakyan	Koiranen GP	18	Retired	5	
Ret	2	(Japan) Nirei Fukuzumi	ART Grand Prix	4	Collision	4	
Ret	1	(Monaco) Charles Leclerc	ART Grand Prix	2	Collision	5	
Fastest lap: (Netherlands) Nyck de Vries (ART Grand Prix) – 1:40.766 (on lap 8)

== Standings after the round ==
Drivers' Championship standings

	Pos.	Driver	Points
	1	(Monaco) Charles Leclerc	177
	2	(Italy) Antonio Fuoco	153
	3	(Thailand) Alexander Albon	145
	4	(Netherlands) Nyck de Vries	104
2	5	(United Kingdom) Jake Dennis	96

Teams' Championship standings

	Pos.	Team	Points
	1	(France) ART Grand Prix	465
2	2	(United Kingdom) Arden International	187
1	3	(Italy) Trident	165
1	4	(Finland) Koiranen GP	137
	5	(France) DAMS	116

- Note: Only the top five positions are included for both sets of standings.

== See also ==
- 2016 Italian Grand Prix
- 2016 Monza GP2 Series round

Previous round: 2016 Spa-Francorchamps GP3 Series round	GP3 Series; 2016 season	Next round: 2016 Sepang GP3 Series round
Previous round: 2015 Monza GP3 Series round	Monza GP3 round	Next round: 2017 Monza GP3 Series round
