= 2016 Silverstone GP3 Series round =

(United Kingdom) 2016 Silverstone GP3 round
Round details
- Round 3 of 9 rounds in the 2016 GP3 Series
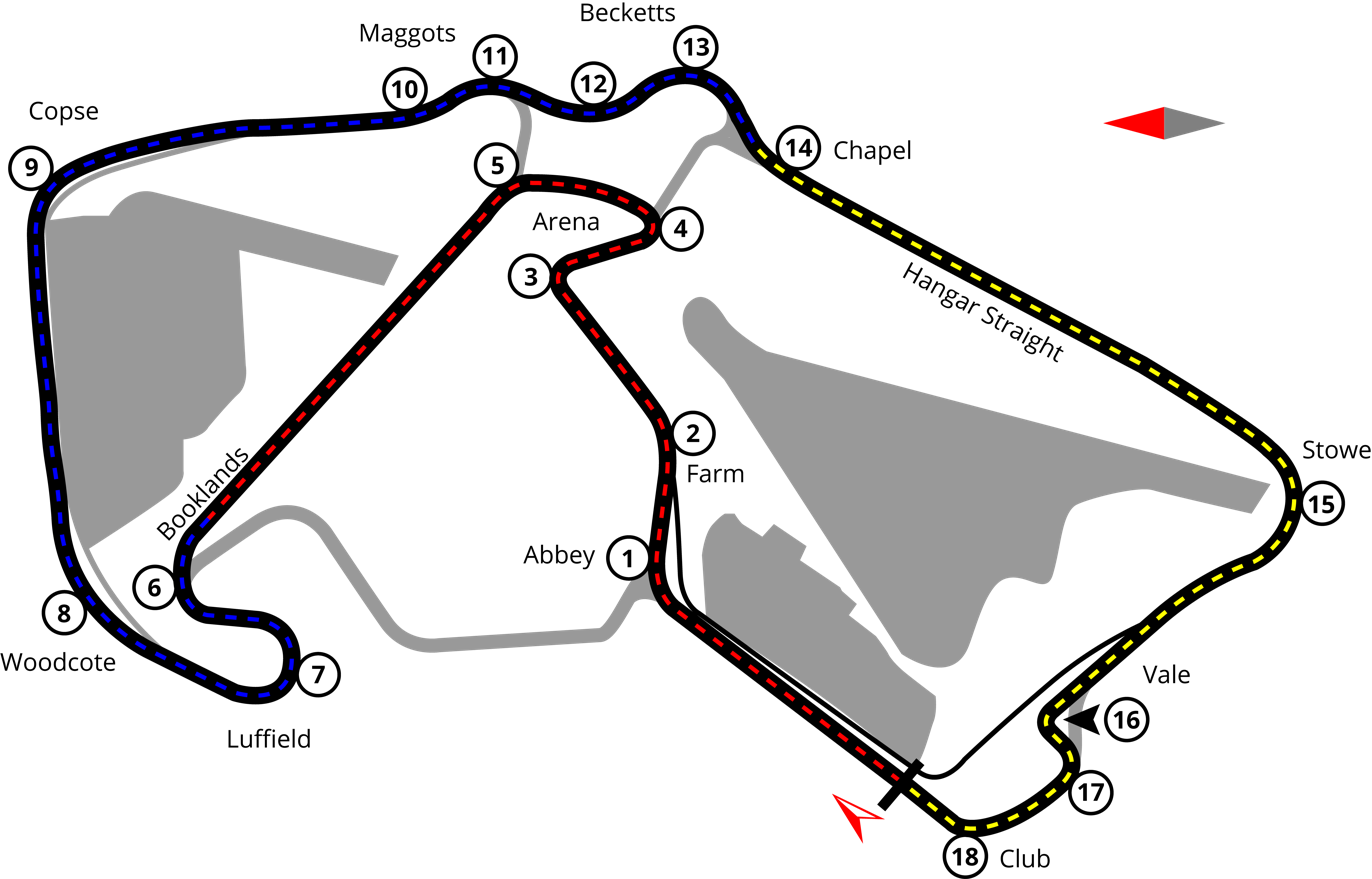
- Layout of the Silverstone Circuit
- Location: Silverstone Circuit; Silverstone, United Kingdom
- Course: Permanent racing facility 5.891 km (3.660 mi)

GP3 Series

Race 1
- Date: 9 July 2016
- Laps: 20

Pole position
Driver	(Thailand) Alexander Albon	ART Grand Prix
- Time: 1:47.348

Podium
First	(Thailand) Alexander Albon	ART Grand Prix
Second	(Monaco) Charles Leclerc	ART Grand Prix
Third	(Italy) Antonio Fuoco	Trident

Fastest lap
Driver	(Thailand) Alexander Albon	ART Grand Prix
- Time: 1:52.174 (on lap 3)

Race 2
- Date: 10 July 2016
- Laps: 15

Podium
First	(Italy) Antonio Fuoco	Trident
Second	(Spain) Álex Palou	Campos Racing
Third	(Monaco) Charles Leclerc	ART Grand Prix

Fastest lap
Driver	(United Kingdom) Jake Dennis	Arden International
- Time: 2:05.175 (on lap 11)

The 2016 Silverstone GP3 Series round was a GP3 Series motor race held on 9 and 10 July 2016 at the Silverstone Circuit in the United Kingdom. It was the third round of the 2016 GP3 Series. The race weekend supported the 2016 British Grand Prix.

== Background ==
It was announced that Arjun Maini would be replacing Oscar Tunjo at Jenzer Motorsport GP3 team for the Silverstone round.

== Classification ==
=== Qualifying ===
In changing conditions, Alexander Albon prevailed an achieved his first pole position and the second for ART Grand Prix for the year. Being over seven-tenths faster than nearest competitor Charles Leclerc, it was a dominant display from Albon. Because of Leclerc's grid penalty, Sandy Stuvik will line up second on the grid, thereby making it the first ever all-Thai front row. Debutant Arjun Maini achieved a time of 1:48.393 to put himself third on the grid.

Pos.	No.	Driver	Team	Time	Gap	Grid
1	3	(Thailand) Alexander Albon	ART Grand Prix	1:47.348	–	1
2	1	(Monaco) Charles Leclerc	ART Grand Prix	1:48.098	+0.750	7 ^{1}
3	8	(Thailand) Sandy Stuvik	Trident	1:48.290	+0.942	2
4	20	(India) Arjun Maini	Jenzer Motorsport	1:48.393	+1.045	3
5	16	(Russia) Matevos Isaakyan	Koiranen GP	1:48.539	+1.191	4
6	27	(United Kingdom) Jake Hughes	DAMS	1:48.567	+1.219	5
7	5	(Italy) Antonio Fuoco	Trident	1:48.568	+1.220	6
8	18	(Malaysia) Akash Nandy	Jenzer Motorsport	1:48.658	+1.310	13 ^{2}
9	2	(Japan) Nirei Fukuzumi	ART Grand Prix	1:48.664	+1.316	8
10	17	(Switzerland) Ralph Boschung	Koiranen GP	1:48.674	+1.326	9
11	7	(France) Giuliano Alesi	Trident	1:48.749	+1.401	10
12	14	(United Kingdom) Matt Parry	Koiranen GP	1:48.758	+1.410	11
13	9	(United Kingdom) Jake Dennis	Arden International	1:48.831	+1.483	12
14	11	(United Kingdom) Jack Aitken	Arden International	1:48.855	+1.507	14
15	22	(Spain) Álex Palou	Campos Racing	1:49.053	+1.705	15
16	24	(Russia) Konstantin Tereshchenko	Campos Racing	1:49.138	+1.790	16
17	26	(United States) Santino Ferrucci	DAMS	1:49.269	+1.921	PL ^{3}
18	23	(Netherlands) Steijn Schothorst	Campos Racing	1:49.358	+2.010	17
19	10	(Colombia) Tatiana Calderón	Arden International	1:49.733	+2.385	18
20	4	(Netherlands) Nyck de Vries	ART Grand Prix	1:49.934	+2.586	19
21	6	(Poland) Artur Janosz	Trident	1:50.005	+2.657	20
–	28	(Switzerland) Kevin Jörg	DAMS	no time	–	21

Notes
1. – Leclerc was given a five-place grid penalty for causing an avoidable collision at the previous round in Austria.
2. – Nandy was given a five-place grid penalty for exceeding the pitlane speed limit at the previous round in Austria.
3. – Ferrucci was handed a five-place grid penalty for impeding and causing a collision during the qualifying session. Seeing as how he could not carry out this penalty in full, he started from the pitlane.

=== Race 1 ===
It was a dominant performance from Albon from the start of the race, with him maintaining the lead with a comfortable buffer over the rest of the pack. The race began to settle toward the middle of the race, with Stuvik falling back through the pack and Leclerc started to chase after his teammate. Jake Hughes was on a charge, but after a rear wing failure, he was forced to retire after running as high as fourth. Matt Parry was also on a charge, with him climbing from 12th on the grid, although he found himself hounded by Nyck de Vries who had started from 19th. However, at the front, Albon was victorious from teammate Leclerc and Antonio Fuoco.

Pos.	No.	Driver	Team	Laps	Time/Retired	Grid	Points
1	3	(Thailand) Alexander Albon	ART Grand Prix	20	37:53.666	1	25 (6)
2	1	(Monaco) Charles Leclerc	ART Grand Prix	20	+1.647	7	18
3	5	(Italy) Antonio Fuoco	Trident	20	+12.239	6	15
4	14	(United Kingdom) Matt Parry	Koiranen GP	20	+19.583	11	12
5	4	(Netherlands) Nyck de Vries	ART Grand Prix	20	+25.000	19	10
6	17	(Switzerland) Ralph Boschung	Koiranen GP	20	+29.094	9	8
7	8	(Thailand) Sandy Stuvik	Trident	20	+33.337	2	6
8	20	(India) Arjun Maini	Jenzer Motorsport	20	+34.157	3	4
9 ^{1}	6	(Poland) Artur Janosz	Trident	20	+35.434	20	2
10	22	(Spain) Álex Palou	Campos Racing	20	+36.256	15	1
11	2	(Japan) Nirei Fukuzumi	ART Grand Prix	20	+36.476	8	
12 ^{2}	12	(United Kingdom) Jake Dennis	Arden International	20	+36.696	12	
13	11	(United Kingdom) Jack Aitken	Arden International	20	+36.852	14	
14	23	(Netherlands) Steijn Schothorst	Campos Racing	20	+37.040	17	
15	28	(Switzerland) Kevin Jörg	DAMS	20	+38.077	21	
16	7	(France) Giuliano Alesi	Trident	20	+38.851	10	
17	10	(Colombia) Tatiana Calderón	Arden International	20	+39.607	18	
18	26	(United States) Santino Ferrucci	DAMS	20	+42.932	PL	
19	18	(Malaysia) Akash Nandy	Jenzer Motorsport	20	+43.180	13	
20	24	(Russia) Konstantin Tereshchenko	Campos Racing	20	+50.729	16	
21	16	(Russia) Matevos Isaakyan	Koiranen GP	20	+51.679	4	
Ret	27	(United Kingdom) Jake Hughes	DAMS	11	Rear Wing	5	
Fastest lap: (Thailand) Alexander Albon (ART Grand Prix) – 1:52.174 (on lap 3)

Notes
1. – Janosz was given a five-second penalty for excessive over-use of track limits.
2. – Dennis was given a five-second penalty for excessive over-use of track limits.

=== Race 2 ===
Pos.	No.	Driver	Team	Laps	Time/Retired	Grid	Points
1	5	(Italy) Antonio Fuoco	Trident	11	27:55.438	6	15
2	22	(Spain) Álex Palou	Campos Racing	11	+0.459	10	12
3	1	(Monaco) Charles Leclerc	ART Grand Prix	11	+0.583	7	10
4	26	(United States) Santino Ferrucci	DAMS	11	+3.695	18	8
5	23	(Netherlands) Steijn Schothorst	Campos Racing	11	+5.060	14	6
6	11	(United Kingdom) Jack Aitken	Arden International	11	+5.626	13	4
7	2	(Japan) Nirei Fukuzumi	ART Grand Prix	11	+6.344	11	2
8	4	(Netherlands) Nyck de Vries	ART Grand Prix	11	+6.370	4	1
9	9	(United Kingdom) Jake Dennis	Arden International	11	+7.733	12	(2)
10	8	(Thailand) Sandy Stuvik	Trident	11	+9.914	2	
11	28	(Switzerland) Kevin Jörg	DAMS	11	+10.890	15	
12	17	(Switzerland) Ralph Boschung	Koiranen GP	11	+12.091	3	
13	24	(Russia) Konstantin Tereshchenko	Campos Racing	11	+24.918	20	
14	3	(Thailand) Alexander Albon	ART Grand Prix	11	+35.466	8	
15	6	(Poland) Artur Janosz	Trident	11	+46.637	9	
16	14	(United Kingdom) Matt Parry	Koiranen GP	11	+50.407	5	
17	27	(United Kingdom) Jake Hughes	DAMS	11	+51.960	22	
18	16	(Russia) Matevos Isaakyan	Koiranen GP	11	+55.404	21	
19	20	(India) Arjun Maini	Jenzer Motorsport	11	+1:16.796	1	
20	10	(Colombia) Tatiana Calderón	Arden International	10	Rear Wing	17	
Ret	18	(Malaysia) Akash Nandy	Jenzer Motorsport	7	Spun off	19	
Ret	7	(France) Giuliano Alesi	Trident	2	Collision damage	16	
Fastest lap: (United Kingdom) Jake Dennis (Arden International) – 2:05.175 (on lap 11)

== Standings after the round ==
Drivers' Championship standings

	Pos	Driver	Points
	1	(Monaco) Charles Leclerc	86
	2	(Thailand) Alexander Albon	84
	3	(Italy) Antonio Fuoco	72
	4	(Netherlands) Nyck de Vries	42
1	5	(Switzerland) Ralph Boschung	38

Teams' Championship standings

	Pos	Team	Points
	1	(France) ART Grand Prix	227
1	2	(Italy) Trident	84
1	3	(Finland) Koiranen GP	64
	4	(France) DAMS	51
	5	(United Kingdom) Arden International	32

- Note: Only the top five positions are included for both sets of standings.

== See also ==
- 2016 British Grand Prix
- 2016 Silverstone GP2 Series round

Previous round: 2016 Red Bull Ring GP3 Series round	GP3 Series; 2016 season	Next round: 2016 Hungaroring GP3 Series round
Previous round: 2015 Silverstone GP3 Series round	Silverstone GP3 round	Next round: 2017 Silverstone GP3 Series round
