= Koiranen Kemppi Motorsport =

Finnish auto racing team

(Finland) Koiranen Kemppi Motorsport
- Founded: 1997
- Founder(s): Marko Koiranen, Jari Koiranen
- Base: Lahti, Finland
- Team principal(s): Marko Koiranen; Kimmo Kemppi
- Current series: Asian Le Mans Series; Formula Academy Finland; Prototype Cup Germany
- Former series: GP3 Series; Formula Renault 2.0 Italia; Nordic Formula Three Masters; Formula Renault 2.0 Alps; Eurocup Formula Renault 2.0; Formula Renault 2.0 NEC; SMP F4 Championship
- Current drivers: (Russia) Nikita Alexandrov (Asian Le Mans) (Finland) Jesse Salmenautio (Finland) Tomi Veijalainen (Asian Le Mans) (Sweden) Sebastian Arenram (PCG)
- Teams' Championships: Eurocup Formula Renault 2.0: 2011, 2014; Formula Renault 2.0 NEC: 2011; Formula Renault 2.0 Alps: 2014, 2015
- Drivers' Championships: Italian Formula Renault 2.0 Winter Series: 2005: Atte Mustonen; Eurocup Formula Renault 2.0: 2010: Kevin Korjus; 2014: Nyck de Vries; 2015: Jack Aitken; Formula Renault 2.0 NEC: 2011: Carlos Sainz Jr. Formula Renault 2.0 Alps: 2012: Daniil Kvyat; 2014: Nyck de Vries; 2015: Jack Aitken; SMP F4 Championship: 2015: Niko Kari
- Website: kk-motorsport.fi

Koiranen Kemppi Motorsport, formerly also known as Koiranen bros. Motorsport and Koiranen GP, is a Finnish auto racing team based in Lahti, Finland. The team currently fields a one car entry in the LMP3 class of Asian Le Mans Series and Prototype Cup Germany and also acts as a promoter of the Formula Academy Finland. Formerly the team was a promoter of the SMP F4 Championship from 2015 to 2018 and the F4 Spanish Championship from 2016 to 2017.

== History ==
Former logo of Koiranen GP

=== Finnish Junior Formulas ===
The team was founded in 1997 by brothers Marko and Jari Koiranen. They joined the Finnish Formula 4 championship the same year, and also competed in Nordic and Finnish Formula Three championships until 2005.

=== Formula Renault ===
2003 saw Koiranen Motorsport join the German Formula Renault Championship, before expanding their Formula Renault programme to include a Eurocup Formula Renault 2.0 campaign. They experienced their first real success when Valtteri Bottas finished third in the Formula Renault 2.0 Northern European Cup in 2007. The team won their first title in 2010, when Kevin Korjus won the Eurocup title.

In 2011, Red Bull Junior Team started collaboration with the Finnish team. Daniil Kvyat and Carlos Sainz Jr. joined the team for Eurocup and NEC campaign. In Northern European Cup Sainz, Jr. achieved drivers' title and with help of Kvyat they both claimed teams' championship. They also claimed teams' trophy in Eurocup. Kvyat remained with the team for the next year and brought drivers' title in new Formula Renault 2.0 Alps series for the team.

In 2012, Koiranen Motorsport was one of eighteen teams to make a bid for one of the vacant grid positions in the Formula Renault 3.5 Series, the highest tier of the Formula Renault championships. The team was unsuccessful, losing out to DAMS and Arden Caterham, but were placed on a reserve list, granting them automatic entry to the grid in the event that any of the existing thirteen teams failed to be ready in time.

2015 was the team's last season with Formula Renault. From 2016 onwards Koiranen will focus on GP3 and running two F4 series.

=== GP3 Series ===
Koiranen GP replaced Ocean Racing Technology in the GP3 Series, starting in 2013. Their drivers at the start of the season were Patrick Kujala and Aaro Vainio from Finland and Kevin Korjus from Estonia. Vainio was replaced by former FIA F2-champion Dean Stoneman for the last two races of the 2013 season. Koiranen GP finished their inaugural season with third place in the team's championship.

For their second season in the GP3 Series Koiranen changed their whole driver line-up. New drivers were Carmen Jordá from Spain, Jimmy Eriksson from Sweden and Santiago Urrutia from Uruguay. Dean Stoneman was once again brought in mid-season after Marussia Manor Racing folded before the race weekend in Sochi. Stoneman replaced Jordá for the remaining four races of the season. Koiranen GP placed 4th in the team's championship.

Koiranen retained Eriksson for the 2015 season and paired him with Adderly Fong and Formula Renault graduate Matt Parry. Koiranen brought in Russian Formula Renault 2.0 Eurocup driver Matevos Isaakyan to replace Fong for last four races of the season. Koiranen repeated last season's results finishing fourth in the teams championship.

Koiranen retained Parry and Isaakyan for the 2016 season. They were teamed up with Mahaveer Raghunathan and Ralph Boschung. Boschung and Parry claimed victories for the team in the rounds at the Red Bull Ring and the Hungaroring respectively and the team finished fifth in the teams' championship.

In 2017, the team withdrew from the sport.

=== Asian Le Mans Series ===
In 2022, Koiranen Kemppi Motorsport entered the Asian Le Mans series fielding a one car entry in the LMP3 class with a Duqueine M30-D08 car driven by Russian Nikita Alexandrov and Finns Jesse Salmenautio and Tomi Veijalainen. Team finished the season 8th overall in their class with 16 points.

=== Prototype Cup Germany ===
In 2022, team also entered the Prototype Cup Germany with a one-car entry driven by Swedish Sebastian Arenram and Finn Jesse Salmenautio.

== Complete series results ==
=== GP3 Series ===
| Year | Car | Drivers | Races | Wins | Poles | F/Laps | Podiums | Points | D.C. | T.C. |
|---|---|---|---|---|---|---|---|---|---|---|
| 2013 | Dallara GP3/13 | (Estonia) Kevin Korjus | 14 | 0 | 1 | 1 | 4 | 107 | 7th | **3rd** |
| 2013 | Dallara GP3/13 | (Finland) Aaro Vainio | 14 | 2 | 1 | 1 | 3 | 75 | 9th | **3rd** |
| 2013 | Dallara GP3/13 | (United Kingdom) Dean Stoneman | 2 | 0 | 0 | 0 | 1 | 20 | 16th | **3rd** |
| 2013 | Dallara GP3/13 | (Finland) Patrick Kujala | 16 | 0 | 0 | 0 | 0 | 5 | 20th | **3rd** |
| 2014 | Dallara GP3/13 | (United Kingdom) Dean Stoneman (Note: Dean Stoneman joined Koiranen GP for the last two weekends of 2014 season. At that point he had collected 95 points with Marussia Manor Racing which were not added to Koiranen's team's championship points.) | 18 | 5 | 1 | 2 | 6 | 163 | **2nd** | 4th |
| 2014 | Dallara GP3/13 | (Sweden) Jimmy Eriksson | 18 | 2 | 2 | 0 | 5 | 134 | 4th | 4th |
| 2014 | Dallara GP3/13 | (Uruguay) Santiago Urrutia | 18 | 0 | 0 | 0 | 0 | 0 | 23rd | 4th |
| 2014 | Dallara GP3/13 | (Spain) Carmen Jordá | 14 | 0 | 0 | 0 | 0 | 0 | 29th | 4th |
| 2015 | Dallara GP3/13 | (Sweden) Jimmy Eriksson | 18 | 1 | 0 | 0 | 3 | 118 | 5th | 4th |
| 2015 | Dallara GP3/13 | (United Kingdom) Matt Parry | 18 | 0 | 0 | 0 | 3 | 67 | 8th | 4th |
| 2015 | Dallara GP3/13 | (Russia) Matevos Isaakyan | 4 | 0 | 0 | 0 | 0 | 2 | 21st | 4th |
| 2015 | Dallara GP3/13 | (Hong Kong) Adderly Fong (Note: Adderly Fong drove for Carlin in round 9.) | 14 | 0 | 0 | 0 | 0 | 0 | 22nd | 4th |
| 2016 | Dallara GP3/16 | (United Kingdom) Matt Parry | 18 | 1 | 0 | 0 | 2 | 82 | 9th | 5th |
| 2016 | Dallara GP3/16 | (Switzerland) Ralph Boschung | 12 | 1 | 0 | 1 | 1 | 48 | 11th | 5th |
| 2016 | Dallara GP3/16 | (Russia) Matevos Isaakyan | 18 | 0 | 0 | 0 | 0 | 17 | 17th | 5th |
| 2016 | Dallara GP3/16 | (Finland) Niko Kari | 2 | 0 | 0 | 0 | 0 | 0 | 26th | 5th |
| 2016 | Dallara GP3/16 | (India) Mahaveer Raghunathan | 2 | 0 | 0 | 0 | 0 | 0 | 27th | 5th |

==== In detail ====
(key) (Races in bold indicate pole position) (Races in italics indicate fastest lap)

| Year | Chassis Engine Tyres | Drivers | 1 | 2 | 3 | 4 | 5 | 6 | 7 | 8 | 9 | 10 | 11 | 12 | 13 | 14 | 15 | 16 | 17 | 18 | DP | DC | TP | TC |
|---|---|---|---|---|---|---|---|---|---|---|---|---|---|---|---|---|---|---|---|---|---|---|---|---|
| 2013 | GP3/13; AER V6; **P** | | CAT; FEA | CAT; SPR | VAL; FEA | VAL; SPR | SIL; FEA | SIL; SPR | NÜR; FEA | NÜR; SPR | HUN; FEA | HUN; SPR | SPA; FEA | SPA; SPR | MNZ; FEA | MNZ; SPR | YMC; FEA | YMC; SPR | | | | | 207 | 3rd |
| 2013 | GP3/13; AER V6; **P** | (Finland) Patrick Kujala | Ret | 16 | 21 | 15 | Ret | EX | 13 | 13 | 14 | 11 | 13 | 20 | 10 | 12 | 8 | 19 | | | 5 | 20th | 207 | 3rd |
| 2013 | GP3/13; AER V6; **P** | (Finland) Aaro Vainio | 5 | 1 | 7 | 2 | 11 | 8 | 14 | 11 | **1** | 9 | 20 | 22 | 16 | 13 | | | | | 75 | 9th | 207 | 3rd |
| 2013 | GP3/13; AER V6; **P** | (United Kingdom) Dean Stoneman | | | | | | | | | | | | | | | 6 | 2 | | | 20 | 16th | 207 | 3rd |
| 2013 | GP3/13; AER V6; **P** | (Estonia) Kevin Korjus | 8 | 2 | 3 | 6 | **2** | 9 | 20 | 15 | 7 | 3 | 4 | 5 | 6 | 5 | 12 | 12 | | | 107 | 7th | 207 | 3rd |
| 2014 | GP3/13; AER V6; **P** | | CAT; FEA | CAT; SPR | RBR; FEA | RBR; SPR | SIL; FEA | SIL; SPR | HOC; FEA | HOC; SPR | HUN; FEA | HUN; SPR | SPA; FEA | SPA; SPR | MNZ; FEA | MNZ; SPR | SOC; FEA | SOC; SPR | YMC; FEA | YMC; SPR | | | 200 | 4th |
| 2014 | GP3/13; AER V6; **P** | (Spain) Carmen Jordá | Ret | Ret | 20 | 21 | 24 | 17 | Ret | 22 | 25 | 25 | 17 | Ret | 20 | 21 | | | | | 0 | 29th | 200 | 4th |
| 2014 | GP3/13; AER V6; **P** | (United Kingdom) Dean Stoneman | | | | | | | | | | | | | | | **1** | 2 | 1 | Ret | 163 | 2nd | 200 | 4th |
| 2014 | GP3/13; AER V6; **P** | (Sweden) Jimmy Eriksson | 2 | 6 | 3 | 2 | **1** | Ret | 7 | 15 | 10 | 16 | Ret | 19 | **1** | 8 | 4 | 16 | 10 | 6 | 132 | 5th | 200 | 4th |
| 2014 | GP3/13; AER V6; **P** | (Uruguay) Santiago Urrutia | 21 | 13 | 16 | 12 | Ret | 14 | 22 | 18 | 12 | Ret | 13 | 18 | Ret | 15 | 14 | 12 | 11 | 12 | 0 | 23rd | 200 | 4th |
| 2015 | GP3/13; AER V6; **P** | | CAT; FEA | CAT; SPR | RBR; FEA | RBR; SPR | SIL; FEA | SIL; SPR | HUN; FEA | HUN; SPR | SPA; FEA | SPA; SPR | MNZ; FEA | MNZ; SPR | SOC; FEA | SOC; SPR | BHR; FEA | BHR; SPR | YMC; FEA | YMC; SPR | | | 195 | 4th |
| 2015 | GP3/13; AER V6; **P** | (Hong Kong) Adderly Fong | 17 | 21 | 17 | 12 | 12 | 14 | 15 | 11 | 15 | 9 | | | 15 | 18 | | | | | 0 | 22nd | 195 | 4th |
| 2015 | GP3/13; AER V6; **P** | (Russia) Matevos Isaakyan | | | | | | | | | | | | | | | Ret | 14 | 9 | 14 | 2 | 21st | 195 | 4th |
| 2015 | GP3/13; AER V6; **P** | (Sweden) Jimmy Eriksson | 6 | 2 | 20 | 10 | 5 | 4 | 6 | 6 | 13 | 16 | 5 | 5 | 8 | 1 | 5 | 7 | 3 | 5 | 118 | 5th | 195 | 4th |
| 2015 | GP3/13; AER V6; **P** | (United Kingdom) Matt Parry | 13 | 9 | 13 | 7 | 3 | 5 | 5 | 3 | Ret | Ret | DSQ | Ret | 7 | Ret | 11 | 3 | 6 | 24 | 67 | 8th | 195 | 4th |
| 2016 | GP3/16; Mecachrome V6; **P** | | CAT; FEA | CAT; SPR | RBR; FEA | RBR; SPR | SIL; FEA | SIL; SPR | HUN; FEA | HUN; SPR | HOC; FEA | HOC; SPR | SPA; FEA | SPA; SPR | MNZ; FEA | MNZ; SPR | SEP; FEA | SEP; SPR | YMC; FEA | YMC; SPR | | | 147 | 5th |
| 2016 | GP3/16; Mecachrome V6; **P** | (United Kingdom) Matt Parry | 12 | 20 | 6 | 7 | 4 | 16 | 1 | 5 | 3 | 7 | Ret | Ret | 9 | 17 | 9 | 4 | Ret | 12 | 82 | 9th | 147 | 5th |
| 2016 | GP3/16; Mecachrome V6; **P** | (India) Mahaveer Raghunathan | 23 | 24 | | | | | | | | | | | | | | | | | 0 | 27th | 147 | 5th |
| 2016 | GP3/16; Mecachrome V6; **P** | (Russia) Matevos Isaakyan | 11 | 6 | Ret | Ret | 21 | 18 | 12 | 8 | Ret | 13 | 8 | 4 | Ret | Ret | 15 | 14 | Ret | 16 | 17 | 17th | 147 | 5th |
| 2016 | GP3/16; Mecachrome V6; **P** | (Switzerland) Ralph Boschung | 10 | 10 | 4 | 1 | 6 | 12 | 5 | 22 | 15 | Ret | | | 18 | 9 | | | | | 48 | 11th | 147 | 5th |
| 2016 | GP3/16; Mecachrome V6; **P** | (Finland) Niko Kari | | | | | | | | | | | Ret | 14 | | | | | | | 0 | 26th | 147 | 5th |

=== SMP F4 Championship ===
| Year | Car | Drivers | Races | Wins | Poles | F/Laps | Podiums | Points | D.C. |
|---|---|---|---|---|---|---|---|---|---|
| 2018 | Tatuus F4-T014 | (Finland) Tuomas Haapalainen | 9 | 1 | 0 | 0 | 3 | 74 | 9th |
| 2018 | Tatuus F4-T014 | (Finland) Markus Laitala | 12 | 0 | 0 | 0 | 0 | 23 | 14th |
| 2018 | Tatuus F4-T014 | (Denmark) Noah Watt | 3 | 0 | 0 | 0 | 0 | 17 | 16th |
| 2018 | Tatuus F4-T014 | (Finland) Mi Maijala | 3 | 0 | 0 | 0 | 0 | 2 | 19th |

=== Asian Le Mans Series ===
| Year | Entrant | No. | Class | Car | Drivers | DUB (United Arab Emirates) | | ABU (United Arab Emirates) | | Points | Team Pos. |
|---|---|---|---|---|---|---|---|---|---|---|---|
| 2022 | (Finland) Koiranen Kemppi Motorsport | 72 | LMP3 | Duqueine M30 - D08 | (Russia) Nikita Alexandrov (Finland) Jesse Salmenautio (Finland) Tomi Veijalainen | 6 | 8 | 8 | Ret | 16 | 8 |

=== Prototype Cup Germany ===
| Year | Entrant | No. | Class | Car | Drivers | (Belgium) SPA | (Germany) NBR | (Germany) LAU | (Germany) HOC | Points | Team Pos. |
|---|---|---|---|---|---|---|---|---|---|---|---|
| 2022 | (Finland) Koiranen Kemppi Motorsport | 72 | LMP3 | Duqueine M30 - D08 | (Sweden) Sebastian Arenram (Finland) Jesse Salmenautio | | | | | 36 | 12 |

== Timeline ==
Former series
| Finnish Formula 4 Championship | 1997–1998 |
| Finnish Formula 3 Championship | 1999–2007 |
| Nordic Formula Renault | 2009–2010 |
| Eurocup Formula Renault 2.0 | 2004, 2006, 2010–2015 |
| Formula Renault 2.0 Northern European Cup | 2006–2011, 2015 |
| Formula Renault 2.0 Alps | 2012–2015 |
| GP3 Series | 2013–2016 |
| SMP F4 Championship | 2015–2016, 2018 |
| Formula Academy Finland | 2018–2022 |
| Asian Le Mans Series | 2022 |
| Prototype Cup Germany | 2022–2023 |

== Notes ==
Achievements
| Preceded by none | Formula Renault 2.0 NEC Teams' Champion; 2011 | Succeeded by Fortec Motorsports |
| Preceded by Tech 1 Racing | Eurocup Formula Renault 2.0 Teams' Champion; 2011 | Succeeded by Josef Kaufmann Racing |
| Preceded by Tech 1 Racing | Eurocup Formula Renault 2.0 Teams' Champion; 2014 | Succeeded by Josef Kaufmann Racing |
| Preceded by Prema Powerteam | Formula Renault 2.0 Alps Teams' Champion; 2014-2015 | Succeeded by none |
