= Aleksander Bosak =

Polish racing driver (born 1993)

- Nationality: (Poland) Polish
- Born: 14 August 1993 (age 33)

GP3 Series career
- Debut season: 2015
- Current team: Arden International
- Car number: 16
- Starts: 18
- Wins: 0
- Poles: 0
- Fastest laps: 0
- Best finish: 20th in 2015

Previous series
- 2014 2013–14 2012–14 2012–14: Florida Winter Series; Eurocup Formula Renault 2.0; Formula Renault 2.0 Alps; Formula Renault 2.0 NEC

Aleksander "Alex" Bosak (born 14 August 1993) is a Polish former racing driver.

== Career ==
=== Karting ===
Bosak began karting in 2007 in the easykart110 Category of the Polish Karting Championship. He continued to race in the various local and European Karting championships. In 2009, he finished as runner-up in the easykart125 Category of the European Championship and took the title in the Polish Championship in the same category.

=== Formula Renault ===
In 2012, Bosak moved into open-wheel racing, competing in Formula Renault 2.0 Alps with the One Racing. He ended the season 39th, and was penultimate among the drivers, who compete a whole season. He also participated in the Formula Renault 2.0 Northern European Cup round at Spielberg with the same team.

Bosak stayed in the series for 2013 Formula Renault 2.0 Alps season but switched to SMP Racing by Koiranen team. He improved to 30th position in the final series standings but again failed to score appoint. Bosak also competed in three rounds of the Eurocup Formula Renault 2.0 and Formula Renault 2.0 Northern European Cup.

Bosak remained in Formula Renault 2.0 Alps for the third consecutive season, joining Prema Powerteam. He had ten point-scoring finishes, which allowed him to take eleventh place in the standings. He had a wild-card entry in the Spa round of the Eurocup Formula Renault 2.0 with the same team.

=== GP3 Series ===
In 2015, Bosak raced in the GP3 Series with Arden International, finishing 20th with one points finish at Spa.

== Racing record ==
=== Career summary ===
Season	Series	Team	Races	Wins	Poles	F/Laps	Podiums	Points	Position
2012	Formula Renault 2.0 Alps	One Racing	14	0	0	0	0	0	39th
2012	Formula Renault 2.0 NEC	One Racing	2	0	0	0	0	0	51st
2013	Formula Renault 2.0 Alps	SMP Racing by Koiranen	14	0	0	0	0	0	30th
2013	Formula Renault 2.0 NEC	AV Formula	7	0	0	0	0	15	40th
2013	Eurocup Formula Renault 2.0	SMP Racing by Koiranen	6	0	0	0	0	0	NC†
2013	Eurocup Formula Renault 2.0	Interwetten.com Racing Team	6	0	0	0	0	0	NC†
2014	Formula Renault 2.0 Alps	Prema Powerteam	13	0	0	0	0	37	11th
2014	Eurocup Formula Renault 2.0	Prema Powerteam	2	0	0	0	0	0	NC†
2014	Florida Winter Series	N/A	12	0	0	0	0	N/A	9th
2015	GP3 Series	Arden International	18	0	0	0	0	4	20th

^{†} As Bosak was a guest driver, he was ineligible for championship points.

=== Complete Formula Renault 2.0 Alps Series results ===
(key) (Races in bold indicate pole position; races in italics indicate fastest lap)

Year	Team	1	2	3	4	5	6	7	8	9	10	11	12	13	14	Pos	Points
2012	One Racing	MNZ; 1; 26	MNZ; 2; 22	PAU; 1; 21	PAU; 2; 18	IMO; 1; 20	IMO; 2; 19	SPA; 1 Ret	SPA; 2; 20	RBR; 1; 19	RBR; 2 Ret	MUG; 1; 25	MUG; 2; 23	CAT; 1; 29	CAT; 2; 24	39th	0
2013	SMP Racing by Koiranen Motorsport	VLL; 1; 23	VLL; 2; 17	IMO1; 1; 26	IMO1; 2 Ret	SPA; 1; 19	SPA; 2; 21	MNZ; 1; 18	MNZ; 2 Ref	MIS; 1; 25	MIS; 2; 15	MUG; 1; 20	MUG; 2; 17	IMO2; 1; 17	IMO2; 2; 12	30th	0
2014	Prema Powerteam	IMO; 1; 14	IMO; 2; 13	PAU; 1; 9	PAU; 2 Ret	RBR; 1; 9	RBR; 2; 6	SPA; 1; 27	SPA; 2; 9	MNZ; 1; 10	MNZ; 2; 11	MUG; 1; 21	MUG; 2; 20	JER; 1; 15	JER; 2; 14	11th	37

=== Complete Formula Renault 2.0 NEC results ===
(key) (Races in bold indicate pole position) (Races in italics indicate fastest lap)

Year	Entrant	1	2	3	4	5	6	7	8	9	10	11	12	13	14	15	16	17	18	19	20	DC	Points
2012	One Racing	HOC; 1	HOC; 2	HOC; 3	NÜR; 1	NÜR; 2	OSC; 1	OSC; 2	OSC; 3	ASS; 1	ASS; 2	RBR; 1; 28	RBR; 2; 25	MST; 1	MST; 2	MST; 3	ZAN; 1	ZAN; 2	ZAN; 3	SPA; 1	SPA; 2	51st	0
2013	AV Formula	HOC; 1	HOC; 2	HOC; 3	NÜR; 1	NÜR; 2	SIL; 1	SIL; 2	SPA; 1	SPA; 2	ASS; 1; 23	ASS; 2; 22	MST; 1; 17	MST; 2; 30	MST; 3; 15	ZAN; 1; 23	ZAN; 2; 16	ZAN; 3 C				39th	15

=== Complete Eurocup Formula Renault 2.0 results ===
(key) (Races in bold indicate pole position; races in italics indicate fastest lap)

Year	Entrant	1	2	3	4	5	6	7	8	9	10	11	12	13	14	DC	Points
2013	SMP Racing	ALC; 1	ALC; 2	SPA; 1; 27	SPA; 2; 31	MSC; 1 Ret	MSC; 2; 30									NC†	0
2013	Interwetten Racing							RBR; 1; 29	RBR; 2; 25	HUN; 1	HUN; 2	LEC; 1	LEC; 2	CAT; 1	CAT; 2	NC†	0
2014	Prema Powerteam	ALC; 1	ALC; 2	SPA; 1; 24	SPA; 2; 35	MSC; 1	MSC; 2	NÜR; 1	NÜR; 2	HUN; 1	HUN; 2	LEC; 1	LEC; 2	JER; 1	JER; 2	NC†	0

† As Bosak was a guest driver, he was ineligible for points

=== Complete GP3 Series results ===
(key) (Races in bold indicate pole position) (Races in italics indicate fastest lap)

Year	Entrant	1	2	3	4	5	6	7	8	9	10	11	12	13	14	15	16	17	18	Pos	Points
2015	Arden International	CAT; FEA; 19	CAT; SPR; 23	RBR; FEA; 16	RBR; SPR; 15	SIL; FEA; 15	SIL; SPR; 16	HUN; FEA; 17	HUN; SPR; 19	SPA; FEA; 8	SPA; SPR; Ret	MNZ; FEA; 15	MNZ; SPR; Ret	SOC; FEA; Ret	SOC; SPR; 20	BHR; FEA; Ret	BHR; SPR; 16	YMC; FEA; 18	YMC; SPR; 23	20th	4
