= Zaid Ashkanani =

Kuwaiti racing driver

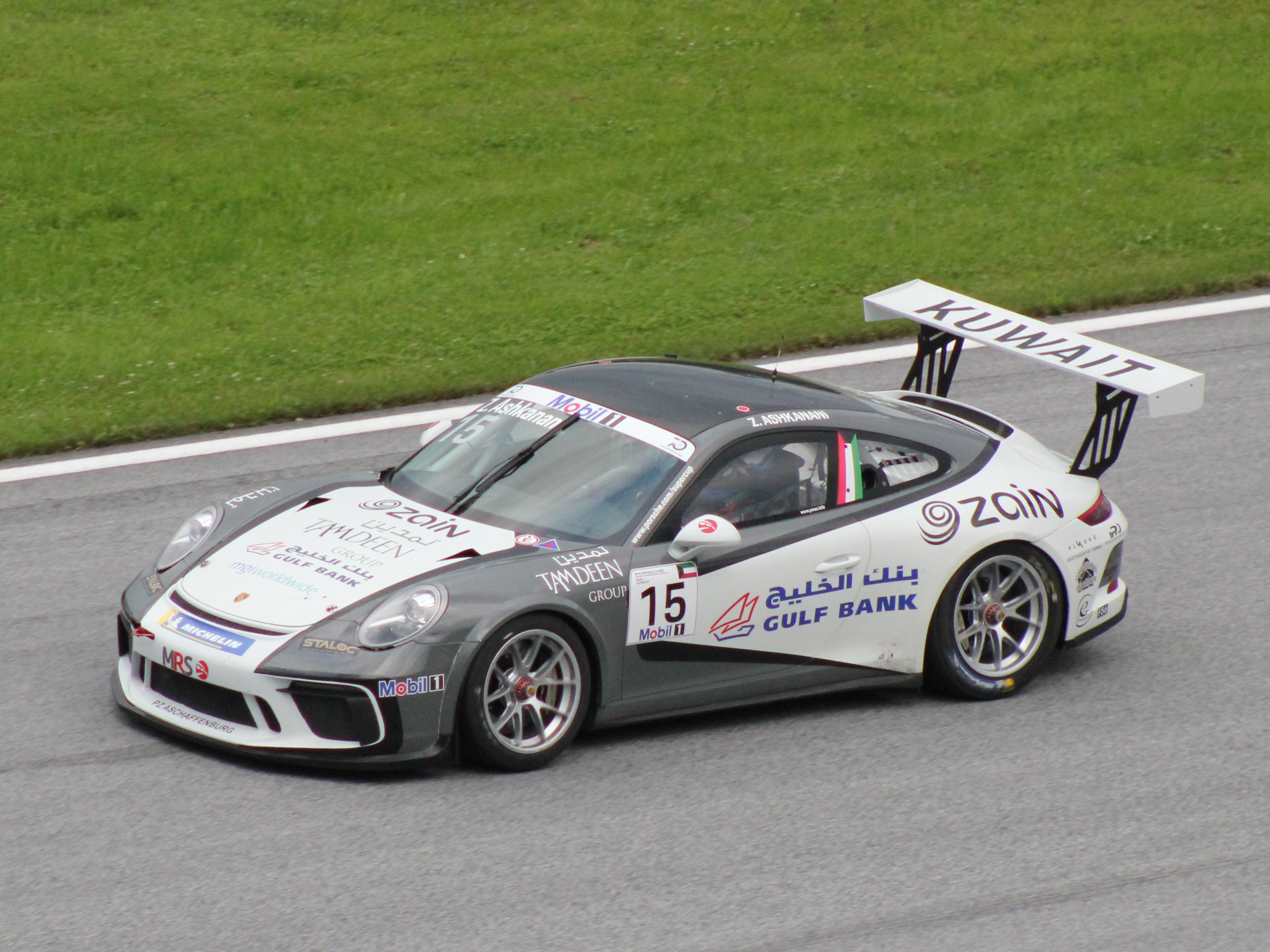
- Zaid Ashkanani at the Red Bull Ring in 2018
- Nationality: (Kuwait) Kuwaiti
- Born: 24 May 1994 (age 32) Salwa, Kuwait

GP3 Series career
- Debut season: 2015
- Current team: Campos Racing
- Categorisation: FIA Silver
- Car number: 23
- Starts: 18
- Wins: 0
- Poles: 0
- Fastest laps: 0
- Best finish: 24th in 2015

Previous series
- 2013 2013 2013 2012–15: Porsche Supercup; ADAC Formel Masters; British Formula Ford Championship; Porsche GT3 Cup Challenge Middle East

Championship titles
- 2013–14: Porsche GT3 Cup Challenge Middle East

Zaid Ashkanani (Arabic: زيد اشكناني; born 24 May 1994) is a former Kuwaiti racing driver. He competed in the 2015 GP3 Series with Campos Racing, and won a race in the 2019 Blancpain GT Series Endurance Cup for Dinamic Motorsport.

== Career ==
=== Porsche GT3 Cup Challenge Middle East ===
Ashkanani began racing in the Porsche GT3 Cup Challenge Middle East in 2012 and already in his first year he managed to get on the podium. In his second season, he became champion having achieved three wins and eight podiums. In the 2014–15 season, he lost the championship in the final race. Clemens Schmid became champion that season, twelve points in front of Ashkanani.

=== GP3 Series ===
On February 12, 2015, Campos Racing announced that Ashkanani would join the team for 2015.

== Racing record ==
=== Career summary ===
Season	Series	Team	Races	Wins	Poles	FLaps	Podiums	Points	Position
2012–13	Porsche GT3 Middle East Championship	BuZaidGT	12	0	0	0	1	169	6th
2013	British Formula Ford Championship	SWB Motorsport	3	0	0	0	0	0	NC‡
2013	ADAC Formel Masters	HS Engineering	3	0	0	0	0	0	21st
2013	Porsche Supercup	GT3 Cup Challenge Middle East	2	0	0	0	0	0	NC‡
2013–14	Porsche GT3 Middle East Championship	BuZaidGT	12	3	4	3	8	245	**1st**
2014–15	Porsche GT3 Middle East Championship	BuZaidGT	12	2	4	4	10	228	**2nd**
2015	GP3 Series	Campos Racing	18	0	0	0	0	0	24th
2016	Porsche Supercup	Lechner Racing Middle East	10	0	0	0	0	52	10th
2017	Porsche Supercup	MRS GT-Racing	11	0	0	0	1	74	9th
2017	Porsche Carrera Cup Germany	MRS GT-Racing	2	0	0	0	0	9	25th
2017	Porsche Carrera Cup Germany	MRS GT-Racing	2	0	0	0	0	0	NC‡
2018	Porsche Supercup	MRS GT-Racing	10	0	0	0	1	83	9th
2018	Porsche Carrera Cup Germany	MRS GT-Racing	2	0	0	0	0	0	NC‡
2019	Blancpain GT Series Endurance Cup	Dinamic Motorsport	5	1	0	0	1	31	8th
2019	FIA Motorsport Games GT Cup	Team Kuwait	1	0	0	1	0	N/A	14th
2022–23	Middle East Trophy - GT3	Team Kuwait by MRS GT-Racing							

^{‡} Not eligible for points.

=== Complete Porsche Supercup results ===
(key) (Races in bold indicate pole position) (Races in italics indicate fastest lap)

Year	Team	1	2	3	4	5	6	7	8	9	10	11	Pos.	Pts
2013	GT3 Cup Challenge Middle East	CAT	MON	SIL	NÜR	HUN	SPA	MNZ	YMC; 15	YMC; 17			NC‡	0‡
2016	Lechner Racing Middle East	CAT; 8	MON; 21	RBR; 12	SIL; 19	HUN; 10	HOC; 15	SPA; 10	MNZ; 10	COA; 24†	COA; 10		10th	52
2017	MRS GT-Racing	CAT; 9	CAT; Ret	MON; 4	RBR; 11	SIL; 13	HUN; Ret	SPA; 12	SPA; 8	MNZ; 2	MEX; 14	MEX; 6	9th	74
2018	MRS GT-Racing	CAT; Ret	MON; 6	RBR; 6	SIL; 6	HOC; 8	HUN; 4	SPA; 2	MNZ; 18	MEX; 16	MEX; 5		9th	83

^{‡} As Ashkanani was a guest driver, he was ineligible for points.
^{†} Driver did not finish the race, but was classified as he completed over 75% of the race distance.

=== Complete GP3 Series results ===
(key) (Races in bold indicate pole position) (Races in italics indicate fastest lap)

Year	Entrant	1	2	3	4	5	6	7	8	9	10	11	12	13	14	15	16	17	18	Pos.	Pts
2015	Campos Racing	CAT; FEA; 11	CAT; SPR; 15	RBR; FEA; 18	RBR; SPR; 14	SIL; FEA; 22	SIL; SPR; 22	HUN; FEA; 20	HUN; SPR; 16	SPA; FEA; 14	SPA; SPR; 18	MNZ; FEA; 13	MNZ; SPR; 15	SOC; FEA; 20	SOC; SPR; 19	BHR; FEA; 17	BHR; SPR; 13	YMC; FEA; 19	YMC; SPR; 21	24th	0
