= Akash Nandy =

Malaysian racing driver (born 1997)

- Nationality: Malaysian
- Born: Akash Neil Nandy; 10 January 1997 (age 29) Kuala Lumpur, Malaysia

GP3 Series
- Categorisation: FIA Silver
- Years active: 2016
- Teams: Jenzer Motorsport
- Starts: 18
- Wins: 0
- Poles: 0
- Fastest laps: 0
- Best finish: 24th in 2016

Previous series
- 2011–12 2013 2013 2014 2015 2017 2018: JK Racing Asia Series; Toyota Racing Series; Formula Masters China; Formula Renault 2.0 Alps; Austria Formula 3 Cup; Porsche Carrera Cup Asia; F3 Asian Championship

Akash Neil Nandy (born 10 January 1997 in Kuala Lumpur) is a Malaysian racing driver who currently competes in the GT World Challenge Asia for Absolute Racing. He is the first and only driver to have competed in the GP3 Series under the Malaysian flag.

== Racing record ==
=== Career summary ===
Season	Series	Team	Races	Wins	Poles	F/Laps	Podiums	Points	Position
2011	JK Racing Asia Series	Meritus Grand Prix	18	0	0	0	3	91	7th
2012	JK Racing Asia Series	Meritus Grand Prix	4	0	0	0	2	45	8th
2012	Formula Pilota China	KCMG	9	0	0	0	0	24	12th
2013	Toyota Racing Series	ETEC Motorsport	15	0	0	0	0	361	14th
2013	Formula Masters China	Cebu Pacific Air by KCMG	18	5	6	6	10	163	**3rd**
2013	Asian Le Mans Series - LMP2	KCMG	1	1	0	0	1	25	8th
2014	Formula Renault 2.0 Alps Series	Tech 1 Racing	14	0	0	0	0	35	13th
2014	Eurocup Formula Renault 2.0	Tech 1 Racing	2	0	0	0	0	0	NC†
2015	Remus F3 Cup	Performance Racing	10	8	10	9	9	218	**2nd**
2015–16	Asian Le Mans Series - GT Am	KCMG	1	1	0	0	1	26	**3rd**
2016	GP3 Series	Jenzer Motorsport	18	0	0	0	0	0	24th
2016	Audi R8 LMS Cup China	KCMG	2	0	0	0	0	4	17th
2017	Porsche Carrera Cup Asia	Force Asia Racing	13	0	0	1	0	115	8th
2017	Audi R8 LMS Cup	KCMG	2	0	0	0	0	12	12th
2018	F3 Asian Championship	Absolute Racing	15	0	0	0	2	125	6th
2018	TCR Asia Series	R Engineering	21	0	0	0	0	13	11th
2019	F3 Asian Championship - Winter Series	Pinnacle Motorsport	9	0	0	0	0	62	7th
2023	GT World Challenge Asia - GT3	B-Quik Racing	2	0	0	0	0	0	NC†
2024	GT World Challenge Asia	Audi Sport Asia Team Absolute	12	1	3	1	3	70	8th
2025	GT World Challenge Asia	Absolute Corse	12	0	0	0	0	30	21st
2025	TSS The Super Series - GT3	B-Quik Absolute Racing	2	1	1	1	2	43	8th
2026	GT World Challenge Asia	Absolute Corse	12	0	2	0	3	83	7th
2026	China GT Championship - GT3	Absolute Racing	4	0	0	0	1	42*	6th*

=== Complete Eurocup Formula Renault 2.0 results ===
(key) (Races in bold indicate pole position; races in italics indicate fastest lap)

Year	Entrant	1	2	3	4	5	6	7	8	9	10	11	12	13	14	DC	Points
2014	Tech 1 Racing	ALC; 1	ALC; 2	SPA; 1; 25	SPA; 2; 25	MSC; 1	MSC; 2	NÜR; 1	NÜR; 2	HUN; 1	HUN; 2	LEC; 1	LEC; 2	JER; 1	JER; 2	NC†	0

† As Nandy was a guest driver, he was ineligible for points

=== Complete Formula Renault 2.0 Alps Series results ===
(key) (Races in bold indicate pole position; races in italics indicate fastest lap)

Year	Team	1	2	3	4	5	6	7	8	9	10	11	12	13	14	Pos	Points
2014	Tech 1 Racing	IMO; 1; 17	IMO; 2; 15	PAU; 1; 7	PAU; 2 Ret	RBR; 1; 21	RBR; 2; 12	SPA; 1; 5	SPA; 2; 10	MNZ; 1; 8	MNZ; 2 Ret	MUG; 1; 13	MUG; 2; 12	JER; 1 Ret	JER; 2; 13	13th	35

=== Complete GP3 Series results ===
(key) (Races in bold indicate pole position) (Races in italics indicate fastest lap)

Year	Entrant	1	2	3	4	5	6	7	8	9	10	11	12	13	14	15	16	17	18	Pos	Pts
2016	Jenzer Motorsport	CAT; FEA; 21	CAT; SPR; 23	RBR; FEA; 12	RBR; SPR; Ret	SIL; FEA; 19	SIL; SPR; 21	HUN; FEA; 17	HUN; SPR; Ret	HOC; FEA; 13	HOC; SPR; 16	SPA; FEA; 16	SPA; SPR; 13	MNZ; FEA; 15	MNZ; SPR; 18	SEP; FEA; Ret	SEP; SPR; 18	YMC; FEA; 13	YMC; SPR; 13	24th	0

=== Complete F3 Asian Championship results ===
(key) (Races in bold indicate pole position) (Races in italics indicate fastest lap)

Year	Entrant	1	2	3	4	5	6	7	8	9	10	11	12	13	14	15	Pos	Points
2018	Absolute Racing	SEP1; 1; 16†	SEP1; 2; 5	SEP1; 3; 2	NIS1; 1; 4	NIS1; 2; 3	NIS1; 3; 4	SIC; 1; 7	SIC; 2; 4	SIC; 3; 7	NIS2; 1; 4	NIS2; 2; 6	NIS2; 3; 6	SEP2; 1; 9	SEP2; 2; 8	SEP2; 3 Ret	6th	125

=== Complete F3 Asian Winter Series results ===
(key) (Races in bold indicate pole position) (Races in italics indicate fastest lap)

Year	Team	1	2	3	4	5	6	7	8	9	Pos	Points
2019	Pinnacle Motorsport	CHA; 1; 4	CHA; 2; 8	CHA; 3; 7	SEP1; 1; 5	SEP1; 2; 9	SEP1; 3; 5	SEP2; 1 Ret	SEP2; 2; 7	SEP2; 3; 7	7th	62
