= 2014 Hockenheimring GP3 Series round =

(Germany) 2014 Hockenheim GP3 round
Round details
- Round 4 of 9 rounds in the 2014 GP3 Series
- The Hockenheimring since 2002
- Location: Hockenheimring, Hockenheim, Germany
- Course: Permanent racing facility 4.574 km (2.842 mi)

GP3 Series

Race 1
- Date: 19 July 2014
- Laps: 18

Pole position
Driver	(Germany) Marvin Kirchhöfer	ART Grand Prix
- Time: 1:28.647

Podium
First	(Germany) Marvin Kirchhöfer	ART Grand Prix
Second	(United Kingdom) Alex Lynn	Carlin
Third	(United Kingdom) Emil Bernstorff	Carlin

Fastest lap
Driver	(Germany) Marvin Kirchhöfer	ART Grand Prix
- Time: 1:31.521 (on lap 12)

Race 2
- Date: 20 July 2014
- Laps: 18

Podium
First	(United Kingdom) Jann Mardenborough	Arden International
Second	(United Kingdom) Dino Zamparelli	ART Grand Prix
Third	(United Kingdom) Alex Lynn	Carlin

Fastest lap
Driver	(United Kingdom) Jann Mardenborough	Arden International
- Time: 1:31.198 (on lap 5)

The 2014 Hockenheimring GP3 Series round was a GP3 Series motor race held on July 19 and 20, 2014 at Hockenheimring in Hockenheim, Germany. It was the fourth round of the 2014 GP3 Season. The race weekend supported the 2014 German Grand Prix.

== Classification ==
=== Summary ===
In a close qualifying session, Marvin Kirchhöfer took his maiden pole position, with a tenth separating him, Alex Lynn and Nick Yelloly. Kirchhöfer held the lead throughout the race, scoring his maiden win at his home race. Lynn finished second, with Emil Bernstorff overtaking Yelloly on the opening lap to finish third.

Nissan- and Red Bull-backed Jann Mardenborough started on reverse grid pole for race two. He led from start to finish to win the race, which was his first win in international single-seaters. He finished nearly four seconds ahead of Dino Zamparelli. Jimmy Eriksson originally finished third, but was later given a penalty for ignoring yellow flags, promoting Lynn to the podium. This allowed Lynn to extend his championship lead, now 30 points ahead of Eriksson.

=== Qualifying ===
Pos.	No.	Driver	Team	Time	Grid
1	2	(Germany) Marvin Kirchhöfer	ART Grand Prix	1:28.647	1
2	10	(United Kingdom) Alex Lynn	Carlin	1:28.706	2
3	26	(United Kingdom) Nick Yelloly	Status Grand Prix	1:28.749	3
4	11	(United Kingdom) Emil Bernstorff	Carlin	1:28.910	4
5	8	(Sweden) Jimmy Eriksson	Koiranen GP	1:28.949	10^{1}
6	25	(Australia) Mitchell Gilbert	Trident	1:28.995	5
7	3	(United Kingdom) Dino Zamparelli	ART Grand Prix	1:29.133	6
8	27	(New Zealand) Richie Stanaway	Status Grand Prix	1:29.205	7
9	21	(Switzerland) Mathéo Tuscher	Jenzer Motorsport	1:29.212	8
10	16	(United Kingdom) Dean Stoneman	Marussia Manor Racing	1:29.247	9
11	1	(Switzerland) Alex Fontana	ART Grand Prix	1:29.329	16^{1}
12	24	(South Africa) Roman de Beer	Trident	1:29.338	11
13	4	(Romania) Robert Vișoiu	Arden International	1:29.400	12
14	6	(United Kingdom) Jann Mardenborough	Arden International	1:29.405	13
15	19	(Italy) Riccardo Agostini	Hilmer Motorsport	1:29.516	14
16	28	(Mexico) Alfonso Celis Jr.	Status Grand Prix	1:29.531	15
17	5	(Switzerland) Patric Niederhauser	Arden International	1:29.672	17
18	17	(Germany) Sebastian Balthasar	Hilmer Motorsport	1:29.849	18
19	20	(Norway) Pål Varhaug	Jenzer Motorsport	1:29.870	24^{2}
20	12	(Macau) Luís Sá Silva	Carlin	1:29.951	19
21	18	(Canada) Nelson Mason	Hilmer Motorsport	1:30.082	20
22	15	(United Kingdom) Ryan Cullen	Marussia Manor Racing	1:30.180	21
23	14	(Finland) Patrick Kujala	Marussia Manor Racing	1:30.272	22
24	22	(Hong Kong) Adderly Fong	Jenzer Motorsport	1:30.646	23
25	9	(Uruguay) Santiago Urrutia	Koiranen GP	1:30.977	25
26	23	(Brazil) Victor Carbone	Trident	1:31.219	26
27	7	(Spain) Carmen Jordá	Koiranen GP	1:32.951	27

- ^1 Jimmy Eriksson and Alex Fontana were each given a five-place grid penalty for causing collisions in the previous round.
- ^2 Pål Varhaug was given a five-place grid penalty for leaving the track and gaining an advantage in the previous round.

=== Feature race ===
Pos.	No.	Driver	Team	Laps	Time/Retired	Grid	Points
1	2	(Germany) Marvin Kirchhöfer	ART Grand Prix	18	27:47.577	1	(25+4+2)
2	10	(United Kingdom) Alex Lynn	Carlin	18	+1.551	2	18
3	11	(United Kingdom) Emil Bernstorff	Carlin	18	+4.459	4	15
4	26	(United Kingdom) Nick Yelloly	Status Grand Prix	18	+9.770	3	12
5	16	(United Kingdom) Dean Stoneman	Marussia Manor Racing	18	+12.928	9	10
6	3	(United Kingdom) Dino Zamparelli	ART Grand Prix	18	+14.922	6	8
7	8	(Sweden) Jimmy Eriksson	Koiranen GP	18	+16.792	10	6
8	6	(United Kingdom) Jann Mardenborough	Arden International	18	+17.173	13	4
9	19	(Italy) Riccardo Agostini	Hilmer Motorsport	18	+18.231	14	2
10	4	(Romania) Robert Vișoiu	Arden International	18	+18.752	12	1
11	1	(Switzerland) Alex Fontana	ART Grand Prix	18	+20.483	16	
12	5	(Switzerland) Patric Niederhauser	Arden International	18	+29.000	17	
13	27	(New Zealand) Richie Stanaway	Status Grand Prix	18	+29.462	7	
14	25	(Australia) Mitchell Gilbert	Trident	18	+29.672	5	
15	22	(Hong Kong) Adderly Fong	Jenzer Motorsport	18	+29.873	23	
16	18	(Canada) Nelson Mason	Hilmer Motorsport	18	+32.628	20	
17	12	(Macau) Luís Sá Silva	Carlin	18	+36.620	19	
18	21	(Switzerland) Mathéo Tuscher	Jenzer Motorsport	18	+37.224	8	
19	20	(Norway) Pål Varhaug	Jenzer Motorsport	18	+37.444	20	
20	15	(United Kingdom) Ryan Cullen	Marussia Manor Racing	18	+37.635	21	
21	24	(South Africa) Roman de Beer	Trident	18	+41.959	11	
22	9	(Uruguay) Santiago Urrutia	Koiranen GP	18	+46.976	25	
23	23	(Brazil) Victor Carbone	Trident	18	+47.277	26	
24	17	(Germany) Sebastian Balthasar	Hilmer Motorsport	18	+81.218	18	
25	14	(Finland) Patrick Kujala	Marussia Manor Racing	16	Did not finish	22	
Ret	7	(Spain) Carmen Jordá	Koiranen GP	7	Did not finish	27	
Ret	28	(Mexico) Alfonso Celis Jr.	Status Grand Prix	1	Did not finish	15	
Fastest lap: Marvin Kirchhöfer (ART Grand Prix) — 1:31.521 (on lap 12)

=== Sprint race ===
Pos.	No.	Driver	Team	Laps	Time/Retired	Grid	Points
1	6	(United Kingdom) Jann Mardenborough	Arden International	18	27:48.880	1	15+2
2	3	(United Kingdom) Dino Zamparelli	ART Grand Prix	18	+3.860	3	12
3	10	(United Kingdom) Alex Lynn	Carlin	18	+7.087	7	10
4	16	(United Kingdom) Dean Stoneman	Marussia Manor Racing	18	+8.688	4	8
5	26	(United Kingdom) Nick Yelloly	Status Grand Prix	18	+9.169	5	6
6	5	(Switzerland) Patric Niederhauser	Arden International	18	+10.046	12	4
7	27	(New Zealand) Richie Stanaway	Status Grand Prix	18	+13.158	13	2
8	19	(Italy) Riccardo Agostini	Hilmer Motorsport	18	+13.502	9	1
9	4	(Romania) Robert Vișoiu	Arden International	18	+14.251	10	
10	12	(Macau) Luís Sá Silva	Carlin	18	+15.999	17	
11	21	(Switzerland) Mathéo Tuscher	Jenzer Motorsport	18	+21.983	18	
12	22	(Hong Kong) Adderly Fong	Jenzer Motorsport	18	+22.949	15	
13	1	(Switzerland) Alex Fontana	ART Grand Prix	18	+22.949	11	
14	18	(Canada) Nelson Mason	Hilmer Motorsport	18	+24.801	16	
15	8	(Sweden) Jimmy Eriksson	Koiranen GP	18	+26.196^{1}	2	
16	14	(Finland) Patrick Kujala	Marussia Manor Racing	18	+27.467	25	
17	24	(South Africa) Roman de Beer	Trident	18	+29.522	21	
18	9	(Uruguay) Santiago Urrutia	Koiranen GP	18	+30.129	22	
19	15	(United Kingdom) Ryan Cullen	Marussia Manor Racing	18	+42.308	20	
20	23	(Brazil) Victor Carbone	Trident	18	+43.252	23	
21	17	(Germany) Sebastian Balthasar	Hilmer Motorsport	18	+43.815	24	
22	7	(Spain) Carmen Jordá	Koiranen GP	18	+1:09.384	26	
23	28	(Mexico) Alfonso Celis Jr.	Status Grand Prix	17	+1 lap	PL^{2}	
DNF	25	(Australia) Mitchell Gilbert	Trident	12	Retired	14	
DNF	11	(United Kingdom) Emil Bernstorff	Carlin	8	Retired	6	
DNF	2	(Germany) Marvin Kirchhöfer	ART Grand Prix	7	Retired	8	
DNF	20	(Norway) Pål Varhaug	Jenzer Motorsport	0	Retired	19	
Fastest lap: Jann Mardenborough (Arden International) — 1:31.198 (on lap 5)

- ^1 Jimmy Eriksson originally finished in third place, but was given a 20-second time penalty for failing to slow under yellow flags, dropping him to fifteenth.
- ^2 Alfonso Celis Jr. was given a three-place grid penalty converted to a pitlane start for causing a collision in race 1.

== Standings after the round ==
Drivers' Championship standings

	Pos.	Driver	Points
	1	(United Kingdom) Alex Lynn	114
	2	(Sweden) Jimmy Eriksson	84
2	3	(Germany) Marvin Kirchhöfer	80
	4	(United Kingdom) Emil Bernstorff	73
2	5	(New Zealand) Richie Stanaway	70

Teams' Championship standings

	Pos.	Team	Points
	1	(United Kingdom) Carlin	191
	2	(Canada) Status Grand Prix	126
1	3	(France) ART Grand Prix	125
1	4	(Finland) Koiranen GP	84
	5	(United Kingdom) Marussia Manor Racing	56

- Note: Only the top five positions are included for both sets of standings.

== See also ==
- 2014 German Grand Prix
- 2014 Hockenheimring GP2 Series round

Previous round: 2014 Silverstone GP3 Series round	GP3 Series; 2014 season	Next round: 2014 Hungaroring GP3 Series round
Previous round: 2013 Nürburgring GP3 Series round	Hockenheimring GP3 round	Next round: 2016 Hockenheimring GP3 Series round
