= 2014 Spa-Francorchamps GP3 Series round =

(Belgium) 2014 Spa-Francorchamps GP3 round
Round details
- Round 6 of 9 rounds in the 2014 GP3 Series
- Layout of the Circuit de Spa-Francorchamps
- Location: Circuit de Spa-Francorchamps, Francorchamps, Wallonia, Belgium
- Course: Permanent racing facility 7.004 km (4.352 mi)

GP3 Series

Race 1
- Date: 23 August 2014
- Laps: 12

Pole position
Driver	(Italy) Luca Ghiotto	Trident
- Time: 2:22.251

Podium
First	(United Kingdom) Dean Stoneman	Marussia Manor Racing
Second	(United Kingdom) Dino Zamparelli	ART Grand Prix
Third	(United Kingdom) Nick Yelloly	Status Grand Prix

Fastest lap
Driver	(Switzerland) Mathéo Tuscher	Jenzer Motorsport
- Time: 2:10.452 (on lap 7)

Race 2
- Date: 24 August 2014
- Laps: 13

Podium
First	(United Kingdom) Alex Lynn	Carlin
Second	(New Zealand) Richie Stanaway	Status Grand Prix
Third	(Switzerland) Alex Fontana	ART Grand Prix

Fastest lap
Driver	(Switzerland) Alex Fontana	ART Grand Prix
- Time: 2:07.448 (on lap 13)

The 2014 Spa-Francorchamps GP3 Series round was a GP3 Series motor race held on August 22 and 23, 2014 at Circuit de Spa-Francorchamps, Belgium. It was the sixth round of the 2014 GP3 Series. The race supported the 2014 Belgian Grand Prix.

== Classification ==
=== Summary ===
Trident completely changed their lineup before the race weekend: Konstantin Tereshchenko replaced Victor Carbone, John Bryant-Meisner replaced Roman de Beer, and Luca Ghiotto replaced Mitchell Gilbert. In addition, Kevin Ceccon replaced Christopher Höher at Jenzer Motorsport.

During a wet qualifying session, Ghiotto secured pole position on his GP3 debut. The race, which was held in wet-to-dry conditions, was delayed after Marvin Kirchhöfer crashed on the formation lap, with some drivers choosing to pit for slick tyres. Emil Bernstorff took the lead from Ghiotto at the start, but pitted at the end of lap one. Mathéo Tuscher, the highest-placed driver on slicks after Patric Niederhauser crashed at turn one, soon made his way up the order and took the lead on lap five, with Dean Stoneman behind. On lap eight, however, he spun at Eau Rouge and could not continue. Stoneman took the lead to win the race, which strangely finished with a red flag, as the officials forgot to wave the chequered flag.

Race two was also held in damp conditions, but saw far less chaos than the previous day. Alex Lynn started from reverse grid pole, and held the lead into turn one, before making a mistake into Les Combes. Richie Stanaway passed him, but Lynn fought back and retook the lead into Rivage. He kept the lead for the rest of the race to take his third win, extending his championship lead to 32 points.

=== Qualifying ===
Pos.	No.	Driver	Team	Time	Grid
1	25	(Italy) Luca Ghiotto	Trident	2:22.251	1
2	11	(United Kingdom) Emil Bernstorff	Carlin	2:22.584	2
3	8	(Sweden) Jimmy Eriksson	Koiranen GP	2:22.678	3
4	27	(New Zealand) Richie Stanaway	Status Grand Prix	2:22.862	4
5	10	(United Kingdom) Alex Lynn	Carlin	2:23.081	5
6	14	(Finland) Patrick Kujala	Marussia Manor Racing	2:23.303	6
7	2	(Germany) Marvin Kirchhöfer	ART Grand Prix	2:23.413	7
8	5	(Switzerland) Patric Niederhauser	Arden International	2:23.438	8
9	21	(Switzerland) Mathéo Tuscher	Jenzer Motorsport	2:23.481	9
10	3	(United Kingdom) Dino Zamparelli	ART Grand Prix	2:23.565	10
11	16	(United Kingdom) Dean Stoneman	Marussia Manor Racing	2:23.586	11
12	6	(United Kingdom) Jann Mardenborough	Arden International	2:23.794	12
13	26	(United Kingdom) Nick Yelloly	Status Grand Prix	2:23.920	13
14	4	(Romania) Robert Vișoiu	Arden International	2:23.996	14
15	22	(Italy) Kevin Ceccon	Jenzer Motorsport	2:24.057	15
16	1	(Switzerland) Alex Fontana	ART Grand Prix	2:24.248	16
17	17	(Germany) Sebastian Balthasar	Hilmer Motorsport	2:24.464	17
18	9	(Uruguay) Santiago Urrutia	Koiranen GP	2:24.687	18
19	18	(Canada) Nelson Mason	Hilmer Motorsport	2:24.846	19
20	12	(Macau) Luís Sá Silva	Carlin	2:24.862	20
21	20	(Norway) Pål Varhaug	Jenzer Motorsport	2:25.301	21
22	28	(Mexico) Alfonso Celis Jr.	Status Grand Prix	2:25.553	22
23	19	(Italy) Riccardo Agostini	Hilmer Motorsport	2:25.965	23
24	24	(Sweden) John Bryant-Meisner	Trident	2:25.969	24
25	15	(United Kingdom) Ryan Cullen	Marussia Manor Racing	2:26.537	25
26	24	(Spain) Carmen Jordá	Koiranen GP	No time	26
WD	25	(Russia) Konstantin Tereshchenko	Trident	Withdrawn	WD

- ^1 Konstantin Tereshchenko was withdrawn from the weekend following a crash in free practice.

=== Feature race ===
Pos.	No.	Driver	Team	Laps	Time/Retired	Grid	Points
1	16	(United Kingdom) Dean Stoneman	Marussia Manor Racing	12	28:58.508	11	25+2
2	3	(United Kingdom) Dino Zamparelli	ART Grand Prix	12	+1.210	10	18
3	26	(United Kingdom) Nick Yelloly	Status Grand Prix	12	+2.923	13	15
4	6	(United Kingdom) Jann Mardenborough	Arden International	12	+3.837	12	12
5	20	(Norway) Pål Varhaug	Jenzer Motorsport	12	+4.938	21	10
6	1	(Switzerland) Alex Fontana	ART Grand Prix	12	+5.734	16	8
7	27	(New Zealand) Richie Stanaway	Status Grand Prix	12	+7.012	4	6
8	10	(United Kingdom) Alex Lynn	Carlin	12	+7.555	5	4
9	11	(United Kingdom) Emil Bernstorff	Carlin	12	+8.059	2	2
10	19	(Italy) Riccardo Agostini	Hilmer Motorsport	12	+9.237	23	1
11	22	(Italy) Kevin Ceccon	Jenzer Motorsport	12	+10.027	15	
12	28	(Mexico) Alfonso Celis Jr.	Status Grand Prix	12	+10.547	22	
13	9	(Uruguay) Santiago Urrutia	Koiranen GP	12	+11.831	18	
14	15	(United Kingdom) Ryan Cullen	Marussia Manor Racing	12	+25.472	25	
15	18	(Canada) Nelson Mason	Hilmer Motorsport	12	+35.045	19	
16	12	(Macau) Luís Sá Silva	Carlin	12	+1:10.700	20	
17	7	(Spain) Carmen Jordá	Koiranen GP	12	+1:43.531	26	
18	25	(Italy) Luca Ghiotto	Trident	12	+1:45.090	1	4
19	17	(Germany) Sebastian Balthasar	Hilmer Motorsport	10	+2 lap	17	
20	24	(Sweden) John Bryant-Meisner	Trident	10	+2 lap	24	
Ret	21	(Switzerland) Mathéo Tuscher	Jenzer Motorsport	7	Retired	9	
Ret	4	(Romania) Robert Vișoiu	Arden International	3	Retired	14	
Ret	5	(Switzerland) Patric Niederhauser	Arden International	0	Retired	8	
Ret	14	(Finland) Patrick Kujala	Marussia Manor Racing	0	Retired	6	
Ret	8	(Sweden) Jimmy Eriksson	Koiranen GP	0	Retired	3	
DNS	2	(Germany) Marvin Kirchhöfer	ART Grand Prix	0	Did not start	7	
WD	23	(Russia) Konstantin Tereshchenko	Trident	0	Withdrawn	WD	
Fastest lap: Mathéo Tuscher (Jenzer Motorsport) — 2:10.452 (on lap 7)^{1}

- ^1 Mathéo Tuscher set the fastest lap, but did not finish in the top 10, so was ineligible to be the point-scorer for the fastest lap. Dean Stoneman was the point-scorer instead for setting the fastest lap of those finishing in the top 10.

=== Sprint race ===
Pos.	No.	Driver	Team	Laps	Time/Retired	Grid	Points
1	10	(United Kingdom) Alex Lynn	Carlin	13	28:25.130	1	15
2	27	(New Zealand) Richie Stanaway	Status Grand Prix	13	+2.050	2	12
3	1	(Switzerland) Alex Fontana	ART Grand Prix	13	+7.947	3	10+2
4	6	(United Kingdom) Jann Mardenborough	Arden International	13	+13.530	5	8
5	26	(United Kingdom) Nick Yelloly	Status Grand Prix	13	+14.501	6	6
6	11	(United Kingdom) Emil Bernstorff	Carlin	13	+14.758	9	4
7	3	(United Kingdom) Dino Zamparelli	ART Grand Prix	13	+16.745	7	2
8	20	(Norway) Pål Varhaug	Jenzer Motorsport	13	+19.075	4	1
9	16	(United Kingdom) Dean Stoneman	Marussia Manor Racing	13	+19.092	8	
10	18	(Canada) Nelson Mason	Hilmer Motorsport	13	+20.980	15	
11	22	(Italy) Kevin Ceccon	Jenzer Motorsport	13	+22.067	11	
12	19	(Italy) Riccardo Agostini	Hilmer Motorsport	13	+34.829	10	
13	15	(United Kingdom) Ryan Cullen	Marussia Manor Racing	13	+40.131	14	
14	25	(Italy) Luca Ghiotto	Trident	13	+40.616	18	
15	28	(Mexico) Alfonso Celis Jr.	Status Grand Prix	13	+43.370	12	
16	21	(Switzerland) Mathéo Tuscher	Jenzer Motorsport	13	+46.892	21	
17	2	(Germany) Marvin Kirchhöfer	ART Grand Prix	13	+51.011	25	
18	9	(Uruguay) Santiago Urrutia	Koiranen GP	13	+52.123	13	
19	8	(Sweden) Jimmy Eriksson	Koiranen GP	13	+52.777	24	
20	4	(Romania) Robert Vișoiu	Arden International	13	+54.430	22	
21	14	(Finland) Patrick Kujala	Marussia Manor Racing	13	+54.868	26	
22	24	(Sweden) John Bryant-Meisner	Trident	13	+58.526	20	
Ret	12	(Macau) Luís Sá Silva	Carlin	12	Accident	16	
Ret	7	(Spain) Carmen Jordá	Koiranen GP	9	Retired	17	
Ret	5	(Switzerland) Patric Niederhauser	Arden International	4	Accident	PL^{1}	
DNS	17	(Germany) Sebastian Balthasar	Hilmer Motorsport	0	Did not start	29	
WD	23	(Russia) Konstantin Tereshchenko	Trident	0	Withdrawn	WD	
Fastest lap: Alex Fontana (ART Grand Prix) — 2:07.448 (on lap 13)

- ^1 Patric Niederhauser was given a five-place grid penalty converted to a pitlane start for causing a collision in race 1.

== Standings after the round ==
Drivers' Championship standings

	Pos.	Driver	Points
	1	(United Kingdom) Alex Lynn	153
	2	(New Zealand) Richie Stanaway	121
3	3	(United Kingdom) Nick Yelloly	95
	4	(United Kingdom) Emil Bernstorff	91
2	5	(Sweden) Jimmy Eriksson	85

Teams' Championship standings

	Pos.	Team	Points
	1	(United Kingdom) Carlin	248
	2	(Canada) Status Grand Prix	216
	3	(France) ART Grand Prix	181
	4	(United Kingdom) Arden International	120
1	5	(United Kingdom) Marussia Manor Racing	86

- Note: Only the top five positions are included for both sets of standings.

== See also ==
- 2014 Belgian Grand Prix
- 2014 Spa-Francorchamps GP2 Series round

Previous round: 2014 Hungaroring GP3 Series round	GP3 Series; 2014 season	Next round: 2014 Monza GP3 Series round
Previous round: 2013 Spa-Francorchamps GP3 Series round	Spa-Francorchamps GP3 round	Next round: 2015 Spa-Francorchamps GP3 Series round
