= 2014 Red Bull Ring GP3 Series round =

Motor racing meeting

(Austria) 2014 Red Bull Ring GP3 round
Round details
- Round 2 of 9 rounds in the 2014 GP3 Series
- Layout of the Red Bull Ring
- Location: Red Bull Ring, Spielberg, Styria, Austria
- Course: Permanent racing facility 4.326 km (2.688 mi)

GP3 Series

Race 1
- Date: 21 June 2014
- Laps: 18

Pole position
Driver	(United Kingdom) Alex Lynn	Carlin
- Time: 1:20.585

Podium
First	(United Kingdom) Alex Lynn	Carlin
Second	(United Kingdom) Emil Bernstorff	Carlin
Third	(Sweden) Jimmy Eriksson	Koiranen GP

Fastest lap
Driver	(United Kingdom) Alex Lynn	Carlin
- Time: 1:21.557 (on lap 17)

Race 2
- Date: 22 June 2014
- Laps: 17

Podium
First	(United Kingdom) Emil Bernstorff	Carlin
Second	(Sweden) Jimmy Eriksson	Koiranen GP
Third	(New Zealand) Richie Stanaway	Status Grand Prix

Fastest lap
Driver	(United Kingdom) Emil Bernstorff	Carlin
- Time: 1:21.439 (on lap 11)

The 2014 Red Bull Ring GP3 Series round was a GP3 Series motor race held on 21 and 22 June 2014 at the Red Bull Ring in Austria. It was the second round of the 2014 GP3 Series. The race weekend supported the 2014 Austrian Grand Prix.

== Classification ==
=== Summary ===
Two lineup changes were made at Hilmer Motorsport before the race weekend. Beitske Visser was replaced by Riccardo Agostini, and Ivan Taranov was replaced by Nikolay Martsenko. In addition, Trident's Denis Nagulin did not race, with no replacement.

Alex Lynn took his second consecutive pole position in a tight qualifying session where the top 21 drivers were separated by only one second. He made a good start and held the lead throughout the race, taking a home win for the Red Bull Junior Team. His teammate Emil Bernstorff took his maiden podium and made it a 1-2 for Carlin. with Jimmy Eriksson in third.

Luís Sá Silva took reverse grid pole for race 2, but was passed at the first corner on lap two by Nick Yelloly. Sá Silva reclaimed the lead at turn two, with Mathéo Tuscher following behind. Tuscher attempted to overtake Sá Silva but the pair collided, taking them both out of the race. Bernstorff took advantage of the incident to pass the three cars ahead and take the lead, where he built an advantage of almost eight seconds to win the race. It was his maiden win, and made the weekend a double win for Carlin. Eriksson took his second podium of the weekend, with Richie Stanaway in third. Lynn remained in the lead of the championship, thirteen points ahead of Eriksson.

=== Qualifying ===
Pos.	No.	Driver	Team	Time	Grid
1	10	(United Kingdom) Alex Lynn	Carlin	1:20.585	1
2	1	(Switzerland) Alex Fontana	ART Grand Prix	1:20.608	2
3	16	(United Kingdom) Dean Stoneman	Marussia Manor Racing	1:20.664	6^{1}
4	11	(United Kingdom) Emil Bernstorff	Carlin	1:20.693	3
5	14	(Finland) Patrick Kujala	Marussia Manor Racing	1:20.744	4
6	8	(Sweden) Jimmy Eriksson	Koiranen GP	1:20.797	5
7	2	(Germany) Marvin Kirchhöfer	ART Grand Prix	1:20.863	7
8	27	(New Zealand) Richie Stanaway	Status Grand Prix	1:20.974	8
9	26	(United Kingdom) Nick Yelloly	Status Grand Prix	1:21.071	9
10	12	(Macau) Luís Sá Silva	Carlin	1:21.142	10
11	19	(Italy) Riccardo Agostini	Hilmer Motorsport	1:21.149	11
12	3	(United Kingdom) Dino Zamparelli	ART Grand Prix	1:21.168	12
13	18	(Canada) Nelson Mason	Hilmer Motorsport	1:21.193	13
14	21	(Switzerland) Mathéo Tuscher	Jenzer Motorsport	1:21.225	14
15	6	(United Kingdom) Jann Mardenborough	Arden International	1:21.227	18^{2}
16	5	(Switzerland) Patric Niederhauser	Arden International	1:21.236	15
17	4	(Romania) Robert Vișoiu	Arden International	1:21.309	16
18	9	(Uruguay) Santiago Urrutia	Koiranen GP	1:21.382	17
19	24	(South Africa) Roman de Beer	Trident	1:21.491	19
20	28	(Mexico) Alfonso Celis Jr.	Status Grand Prix	1:21.591	25^{3}
21	20	(Norway) Pål Varhaug	Jenzer Motorsport	1:21.654	20
22	22	(Hong Kong) Adderly Fong	Jenzer Motorsport	1:21.908	21
23	23	(Brazil) Victor Carbone	Trident	1:22.125	22
24	17	(Russia) Nikolay Martsenko	Hilmer Motorsport	1:22.171	23
25	15	(United Kingdom) Ryan Cullen	Marussia Manor Racing	1:22.259	24
26	7	(Spain) Carmen Jordá	Koiranen GP	1:23.802	26

- ^1 Dean Stoneman was given a three-place grid penalty for leaving the track and gaining an advantage.
- ^2 Jann Mardenborough was given a three-place grid penalty for crossing the pit entry line.
- ^3 Alfonso Celis Jr. was given a five-place grid penalty for causing a collision in the previous round.

=== Feature Race ===
Pos.	No.	Driver	Team	Laps	Time/Retired	Grid	Points
1	10	(United Kingdom) Alex Lynn	Carlin	18	25:50.556	1	25+4+2
2	11	(United Kingdom) Emil Bernstorff	Carlin	18	+2.764	3	18
3	8	(Sweden) Jimmy Eriksson	Koiranen GP	18	+8.385	5	15
4	27	(New Zealand) Richie Stanaway	Status Grand Prix	18	+10.309	8	12
5	2	(Germany) Marvin Kirchhöfer	ART Grand Prix	18	+10.958	7	10
6	21	(Switzerland) Mathéo Tuscher	Jenzer Motorsport	18	+12.128	14	8
7	26	(United Kingdom) Nick Yelloly	Status Grand Prix	18	+12.597	9	6
8	12	(Macau) Luís Sá Silva	Carlin	18	+16.707	10	4
9	14	(Finland) Patrick Kujala	Marussia Manor Racing	18	+17.647	4	2
10	5	(Switzerland) Patric Niederhauser	Arden International	18	+18.434	15	1
11	6	(United Kingdom) Jann Mardenborough	Arden International	18	+18.845	18	
12	24	(South Africa) Roman de Beer	Trident	18	+19.474	19	
13	20	(Norway) Pål Varhaug	Jenzer Motorsport	18	+19.979	20	
14	18	(Canada) Nelson Mason	Hilmer Motorsport	18	+20.252	13	
15	3	(United Kingdom) Dino Zamparelli	ART Grand Prix	18	+24.748	12	
16	9	(Uruguay) Santiago Urrutia	Koiranen GP	18	+25.285	17	
17	15	(United Kingdom) Ryan Cullen	Marussia Manor Racing	18	+34.407	24	
18	23	(Brazil) Victor Carbone	Trident	18	+34.896	22	
19	17	(Russia) Nikolay Martsenko	Hilmer Motorsport	18	+39.069	23	
20	7	(Spain) Carmen Jordá	Koiranen GP	18	+58.532	26	
Ret	19	(Italy) Riccardo Agostini	Hilmer Motorsport	9	Retired	11	
Ret	28	(Mexico) Alfonso Celis Jr.	Status Grand Prix	5	Retired	25	
Ret	22	(Hong Kong) Adderly Fong	Jenzer Motorsport	5	Retired	21	
Ret	4	(Romania) Robert Vișoiu	Arden International	0	Retired	16	
Ret	16	(United Kingdom) Dean Stoneman	Marussia Manor Racing	0	Retired	6	
Ret	1	(Switzerland) Alex Fontana	ART Grand Prix	0	Retired	2	
Fastest lap: Alex Lynn (Carlin) — 1:21.557 (on lap 17)

=== Sprint Race ===
Pos.	No.	Driver	Team	Laps	Time/Retired	Grid	Points
1	11	(United Kingdom) Emil Bernstorff	Carlin	17	23:24.023	7	15+2
2	8	(Sweden) Jimmy Eriksson	Koiranen GP	17	+7.793	6	12
3	27	(New Zealand) Richie Stanaway	Status Grand Prix	17	+11.891	5	10
4	24	(South Africa) Roman de Beer	Trident	17	+12.336	12	8
5	26	(United Kingdom) Nick Yelloly	Status Grand Prix	17	+12.985	2	6
6	5	(Switzerland) Patric Niederhauser	Arden International	17	+13.423	10	4
7	14	(Finland) Patrick Kujala	Marussia Manor Racing	17	+16.947	9	2
8	3	(United Kingdom) Dino Zamparelli	ART Grand Prix	17	+19.196	15	1
9	20	(Norway) Pål Varhaug	Jenzer Motorsport	17	+19.701	13	
10	16	(United Kingdom) Dean Stoneman	Marussia Manor Racing	17	+21.213	24	
11	19	(Italy) Riccardo Agostini	Hilmer Motorsport	17	+21.551	21	
12	9	(Uruguay) Santiago Urrutia	Koiranen GP	17	+23.846	16	
13	15	(United Kingdom) Ryan Cullen	Marussia Manor Racing	17	+24.676	17	
14	4	(Romania) Robert Vișoiu	Arden International	17	+25.503	23	
15	22	(Hong Kong) Adderly Fong	Jenzer Motorsport	17	+26.670	22	
16	18	(Canada) Nelson Mason	Hilmer Motorsport	17	+27.382	14	
17	1	(Switzerland) Alex Fontana	ART Grand Prix	17	+30.742	PL^{1}	
18	23	(Brazil) Victor Carbone	Trident	17	+33.153	18	
19	28	(Mexico) Alfonso Celis Jr.	Status Grand Prix	17	+37.441	PL^{1}	
20	10	(United Kingdom) Alex Lynn	Carlin	17	+57.946	8	
21	7	(Spain) Carmen Jordá	Koiranen GP	17	+1:11.813	20	
22	12	(Macau) Luís Sá Silva	Carlin	16	+1 lap	1	
Ret	6	(United Kingdom) Jann Mardenborough	Arden International	7	Retired	11	
Ret	21	(Switzerland) Mathéo Tuscher	Jenzer Motorsport	1	Retired	3	
DNS	2	(Germany) Marvin Kirchhöfer	ART Grand Prix	0	Did not start	4	
DNS	17	(Russia) Nikolay Martsenko	Hilmer Motorsport	0	Did not start	19	
Fastest lap: Emil Bernstorff (Carlin) — 1:21.439 (on lap 11)

- ^1 Alex Fontana and Alfonso Celis Jr. were both given five-place grid penalty for causing collisions in race 1. As the penalties could not be served in full, they were required to start from the pitlane.

== Standings after the round ==
Drivers' Championship standings

	Pos.	Driver	Points
	1	(United Kingdom) Alex Lynn	62
1	2	(Sweden) Jimmy Eriksson	49
1	3	(New Zealand) Richie Stanaway	45
7	4	(United Kingdom) Emil Bernstorff	36
2	5	(Germany) Marvin Kirchhöfer	26

Teams' Championship standings

	Pos.	Team	Points
2	1	(United Kingdom) Carlin	102
2	2	(Canada) Status Grand Prix	61
2	3	(Finland) Koiranen GP	49
3	4	(France) ART Grand Prix	45
3	5	(United Kingdom) Marussia Manor Racing	37

- Note: Only the top five positions are included for both sets of standings.

== See also ==
- 2014 Austrian Grand Prix
- 2014 Red Bull Ring GP2 Series round

Previous round: 2014 Catalunya GP3 Series round	GP3 Series; 2014 season	Next round: 2014 Silverstone GP3 Series round
Previous round: none	Red Bull Ring GP3 round	Next round: 2015 Red Bull Ring GP3 Series round
