= 2014 Catalunya GP3 Series round =

Motor racing competition

(Spain) 2014 Catalunya GP3 round
Round details
- Round 1 of 9 rounds in the 2014 GP3 Series
- Layout of the Circuit de Catalunya
- Location: Circuit de Catalunya; Montmeló, Spain
- Course: Permanent racing facility 4.665 km (2.892 mi)

GP3 Series

Race 1
- Date: 10 May 2014
- Laps: 16

Pole position
Driver	(United Kingdom) Alex Lynn	Carlin
- Time: 1:35.614

Podium
First	(United Kingdom) Alex Lynn	Carlin
Second	(Sweden) Jimmy Eriksson	Koiranen GP
Third	(New Zealand) Richie Stanaway	Status Grand Prix

Fastest lap
Driver	(United Kingdom) Alex Lynn	Carlin
- Time: 1:38.960 (on lap 7)

Race 2
- Date: 11 May 2014
- Laps: 15

Podium
First	(United Kingdom) Dean Stoneman	Marussia Manor Racing
Second	(Switzerland) Mathéo Tuscher	Jenzer Motorsport
Third	(United Kingdom) Dino Zamparelli	ART Grand Prix

Fastest lap
Driver	(Switzerland) Patric Niederhauser	Arden International
- Time: 1:40.580 (on lap 15)

The 2014 Catalunya GP3 Series round was a GP3 Series motor race held on May 10 and 11, 2014 at Circuit de Catalunya, Montmeló, Spain. It was the first round of the 2014 GP3 Series. The race supported the 2014 Spanish Grand Prix.

== Classification ==
=== Summary ===
Red Bull Junior Team driver Alex Lynn took pole position for the opening race of the season. He held off Marvin Kirchhöfer at the start of the race and pulled away to win on debut with a gap of 2.4 seconds to Jimmy Eriksson. It was Eriksson's maiden points finish, having failed to score in the previous season.

Race two was held in damp conditions. Mathéo Tuscher started on pole position and held the lead at the start, but was overtaken by Dean Stoneman on lap two. He was unable to find a way back fast, giving Stoneman his maiden win. Lynn gambled on taking wet tyres during a safety car period, which did not pay off, and he finished 18th; nonetheless, he held the lead of the championship, 8 points ahead of Richie Stanaway.

=== Qualifying ===
Pos	No	Driver	Team	Time	Grid
1	10	(United Kingdom) Alex Lynn	Carlin	1:35.614	1
2	2	(Germany) Marvin Kirchhöfer	ART Grand Prix	1:35.726	2
3	27	(New Zealand) Richie Stanaway	Status Grand Prix	1:35.784	3
4	8	(Sweden) Jimmy Eriksson	Koiranen GP	1:35.904	4
5	14	(Finland) Patrick Kujala	Marussia Manor Racing	1:35.970	5
6	3	(United Kingdom) Dino Zamparelli	ART Grand Prix	1:36.015	6
7	11	(United Kingdom) Emil Bernstorff	Carlin	1:36.136	7
8	1	(Switzerland) Alex Fontana	ART Grand Prix	1:36.151	8
9	20	(Norway) Pål Varhaug	Jenzer Motorsport	1:36.165	9
10	21	(Switzerland) Mathéo Tuscher	Jenzer Motorsport	1:36.210	10
11	26	(United Kingdom) Nick Yelloly	Status Grand Prix	1:36.230	11
12	5	(Switzerland) Patric Niederhauser	Arden International	1:36.276	12
13	16	(United Kingdom) Dean Stoneman	Marussia Manor Racing	1:36.375	13
14	24	(South Africa) Roman de Beer	Trident	1:36.579	14
15	4	(Romania) Robert Vișoiu	Arden International	1:36.711	15
16	15	(United Kingdom) Ryan Cullen	Marussia Manor Racing	1:36.759	16
17	22	(Hong Kong) Adderly Fong	Jenzer Motorsport	1:36.787	17
18	6	(United Kingdom) Jann Mardenborough	Arden International	1:36.871	18
19	23	(Brazil) Victor Carbone	Trident	1:37.023	19
20	18	(Canada) Nelson Mason	Hilmer Motorsport	1:37.084	23^{1}
21	12	(Macau) Luís Sá Silva	Carlin	1:37.163	20
22	9	(Uruguay) Santiago Urrutia	Koiranen GP	1:37.166	21
23	28	(Mexico) Alfonso Celis Jr.	Status Grand Prix	1:37.300	22
24	19	(Netherlands) Beitske Visser	Hilmer Motorsport	1:37.406	24
25	17	(Russia) Ivan Taranov	Hilmer Motorsport	1:38.071	25
26	25	(Russia) Denis Nagulin	Trident	1:38.203	26
27	7	(Spain) Carmen Jordá	Koiranen GP	1:38.694	27

- ^1 Nelson Mason was given a three-place grid penalty as his car was released in an unsafe condition during free practice.

=== Feature Race ===
Pos	No	Driver	Team	Laps	Time/Retired	Grid	Points
1	10	(United Kingdom) Alex Lynn	Carlin	16	26:36.158	1	25+4+2
2	8	(Sweden) Jimmy Eriksson	Koiranen GP	16	+2.451	4	18
3	27	(New Zealand) Richie Stanaway	Status Grand Prix	16	+10.417	3	15
4	14	(Finland) Patrick Kujala	Marussia Manor Racing	16	+12.712	5	12
5	2	(Germany) Marvin Kirchhöfer	ART Grand Prix	16	+13.475	2	10
6	3	(United Kingdom) Dino Zamparelli	ART Grand Prix	16	+16.535	6	8
7	16	(United Kingdom) Dean Stoneman	Marussia Manor Racing	16	+17.682	13	6
8	21	(Switzerland) Mathéo Tuscher	Jenzer Motorsport	16	+19.358	10	4
9	26	(United Kingdom) Nick Yelloly	Status Grand Prix	16	+19.983	11	2
10	5	(Switzerland) Patric Niederhauser	Arden International	16	+20.513	12	1
11	1	(Switzerland) Alex Fontana	ART Grand Prix	16	+21.088	8	
12	20	(Norway) Pål Varhaug	Jenzer Motorsport	16	+27.560	9	
13	4	(Romania) Robert Vișoiu	Arden International	16	+28.799	15	
14	6	(United Kingdom) Jann Mardenborough	Arden International	16	+29.342	18	
15	15	(United Kingdom) Ryan Cullen	Marussia Manor Racing	16	+32.313	16	
16	12	(Macau) Luís Sá Silva	Carlin	16	+33.359	20	
17	18	(Canada) Nelson Mason	Hilmer Motorsport	16	+35.854	23	
18	28	(Mexico) Alfonso Celis Jr.	Status Grand Prix	16	+41.705	22	
19	19	(Netherlands) Beitske Visser	Hilmer Motorsport	16	+50.120	24	
20	25	(Russia) Denis Nagulin	Trident	16	+53.776	26	
21	9	(Uruguay) Santiago Urrutia	Koiranen GP	16	+1:12.602^{1}	21	
22	17	(Russia) Ivan Taranov	Hilmer Motorsport	15	+1 lap	25	
Ret	22	(Hong Kong) Adderly Fong	Jenzer Motorsport	4	Retired	17	
Ret	23	(Brazil) Victor Carbone	Trident	0	Retired	19	
Ret	24	(South Africa) Roman de Beer	Trident	0	Retired	14	
Ret	11	(United Kingdom) Emil Bernstorff	Carlin	0	Retired	7	
Ret	7	(Spain) Carmen Jordá	Koiranen GP	0	Retired	27	
Fastest lap: Alex Lynn (Carlin) — 1:38.960 (on lap 7)

- ^1 Santiago Urrutia originally finished in 20th, but received a 20-second time penalty for overtaking under yellow flags, dropping him to 21st.

=== Sprint Race ===
Pos	No	Driver	Team	Laps	Time/Retired	Grid	Points
1	16	(United Kingdom) Dean Stoneman	Marussia Manor Racing	15	30:14.777	2	15
2	21	(Switzerland) Mathéo Tuscher	Jenzer Motorsport	15	+0.925	1	12
3	3	(United Kingdom) Dino Zamparelli	ART Grand Prix	15	+1.802	3	10
4	27	(New Zealand) Richie Stanaway	Status Grand Prix	15	+3,275	6	8
5	2	(Germany) Marvin Kirchhöfer	ART Grand Prix	15	+3.740	4	6
6	8	(Sweden) Jimmy Eriksson	Koiranen GP	15	+6.294	7	4
7	26	(United Kingdom) Nick Yelloly	Status Grand Prix	15	+6.668	9	2
8	11	(United Kingdom) Emil Bernstorff	Carlin	15	+7.303	26	1
9	5	(Switzerland) Patric Niederhauser	Arden International	15	+10.665	10	2
10	12	(Macau) Luís Sá Silva	Carlin	15	+15.987	16	
11	4	(Romania) Robert Vișoiu	Arden International	15	+16.714	13	
12	22	(Hong Kong) Adderly Fong	Jenzer Motorsport	15	+17.941	23	
13	9	(Uruguay) Santiago Urrutia	Koiranen GP	15	+43.010	21	
14	6	(United Kingdom) Jann Mardenborough	Arden International	15	+45.167	14	
15	19	(Netherlands) Beitske Visser	Hilmer Motorsport	15	+46.998	19	
16	15	(United Kingdom) Ryan Cullen	Marussia Manor Racing	15	+53.140	15	
17	23	(Brazil) Victor Carbone	Trident	15	+1:06.000	24	
18	10	(United Kingdom) Alex Lynn	Carlin	15	+1:26.118	8	
19	1	(Switzerland) Alex Fontana	ART Grand Prix	15	+1:34.572	11	
20	17	(Russia) Ivan Taranov	Hilmer Motorsport	15	+1:43.432	22	
Ret	7	(Spain) Carmen Jordá	Koiranen GP	8	Retired	27	
Ret	28	(Mexico) Alfonso Celis Jr.	Status Grand Prix	6	Retired	18	
Ret	20	(Norway) Pål Varhaug	Jenzer Motorsport	6	Retired	12	
Ret	25	(Russia) Denis Nagulin	Trident	3	Retired	20	
Ret	18	(Canada) Nelson Mason	Hilmer Motorsport	2	Retired	17	
Ret	14	(Finland) Patrick Kujala	Marussia Manor Racing	1	Retired	5	
DSQ	24	(South Africa) Roman de Beer	Trident	13	Disqualified^{1}	25	
Fastest lap: Patric Niederhauser (Arden International) — 1:40.580 (on lap 15)

- ^1 Roman de Beer was disqualified from the race for failing to serve a drive-through penalty.

== Standings after the round ==
Drivers' Championship standings

Pos.	Driver	Points
1	(United Kingdom) Alex Lynn	31
2	(New Zealand) Richie Stanaway	23
3	(Sweden) Jimmy Eriksson	22
4	(United Kingdom) Dean Stoneman	21
5	(United Kingdom) Dino Zamparelli	18

Teams' Championship standings

Pos.	Team	Points
1	(France) ART Grand Prix	34
2	(United Kingdom) Marussia Manor Racing	33
3	(United Kingdom) Carlin	32
4	(Canada) Status Grand Prix	27
5	(Finland) Koiranen GP	22

- Note: Only the top five positions are included for both sets of standings.

== See also ==
- 2014 Spanish Grand Prix
- 2014 Catalunya GP2 Series round

Previous round: 2013 Yas Marina GP3 Series round	GP3 Series; 2014 season	Next round: 2014 Red Bull Ring GP3 Series round
Previous round: 2013 Catalunya GP3 Series round	Catalunya GP3 round	Next round: 2015 Catalunya GP3 Series round
