= 2014 Hungaroring GP3 Series round =

Motor racing competition

(Hungary) 2014 Hungaroring GP3 round
Round details
- Round 5 of 9 rounds in the 2014 GP3 Series
- Layout of the Hungaroring
- Location: Hungaroring, Mogyoród, Pest, Hungary
- Course: Permanent racing facility 4.381 km (2.722 mi)

GP3 Series

Race 1
- Date: 26 July 2014
- Laps: 17

Pole position
Driver	(New Zealand) Richie Stanaway	Status Grand Prix
- Time: 1:33.553

Podium
First	(New Zealand) Richie Stanaway	Status Grand Prix
Second	(United Kingdom) Nick Yelloly	Status Grand Prix
Third	(Romania) Robert Vișoiu	Arden International

Fastest lap
Driver	(United Kingdom) Jann Mardenborough	Arden International
- Time: 1:36.271 (on lap 13)

Race 2
- Date: 27 July 2014
- Laps: 17

Podium
First	(Switzerland) Patric Niederhauser	Arden International
Second	(United Kingdom) Dino Zamparelli	ART Grand Prix
Third	(United Kingdom) Jann Mardenborough	Arden International

Fastest lap
Driver	(New Zealand) Mitchell Gilbert	Trident
- Time: 1:35.758 (on lap 6)

The 2014 Hungaroring GP3 Series round was a GP3 Series motor race held on 26 and 27 July 2014 at the Hungaroring in Mogyoród, Pest, Hungary. It was the fifth round of the 2014 GP3 Series. The race weekend supported the 2014 Hungarian Grand Prix.

== Classification ==
=== Summary ===
Adderly Fong was replaced by Christopher Höher at Jenzer Motorsport before the race weekend, as Fong was racing in Japan. In addition, Victor Carbone did not appear, and no driver was entered in the Trident #23 car in his place.

Despite a late red flag as Roman de Beer and Alfonso Celis Jr. left the track, Richie Stanaway claimed pole position in qualifying. He was challenged into turn one by Robert Vișoiu, but held the lead. Vișoiu remained within half a second of Stanaway for much of the race; on the penultimate lap, Stanaway ran deep at the chicane, but Vișoiu locked up while attempting to overtake, allowing Stanaway retake the lead and win the race. Nick Yelloly followed him through to make it a 1-2 finish for Status Grand Prix.

Dino Zamparelli started on reverse grid pole for race two. Patric Niederhauser had the best start, allowing him to pass both Zamparelli and Jann Mardenborough, and he held the lead for the rest of the race to take his first GP3 win since 2012. Zamparelli and Mardenborough completed the podium. Alex Lynn remained in the championship lead, 31 points ahead of Stanaway.

=== Qualifying ===
Pos.	No.	Driver	Team	Time	Grid
1	27	(New Zealand) Richie Stanaway	Status Grand Prix	1:33.553	1
2	10	(United Kingdom) Alex Lynn	Carlin	1:33.588	2
3	26	(United Kingdom) Nick Yelloly	Status Grand Prix	1:33.679	3
4	4	(Romania) Robert Vișoiu	Arden International	1:33.729	4
5	3	(United Kingdom) Dino Zamparelli	ART Grand Prix	1:33.771	5
6	11	(United Kingdom) Emil Bernstorff	Carlin	1:33.807	6
7	5	(Switzerland) Patric Niederhauser	Arden International	1:33.873	7
8	1	(Switzerland) Alex Fontana	ART Grand Prix	1:33.894	8
9	14	(Finland) Patrick Kujala	Marussia Manor Racing	1:33.975	9
10	2	(Germany) Marvin Kirchhöfer	ART Grand Prix	1:34.076	14^{1}
11	12	(Macau) Luís Sá Silva	Carlin	1:34.084	15^{2}
12	8	(Sweden) Jimmy Eriksson	Koiranen GP	1:34.124	10
13	6	(United Kingdom) Jann Mardenborough	Arden International	1:34.231	11
14	25	(Australia) Mitchell Gilbert	Trident	1:34.253	12
15	9	(Uruguay) Santiago Urrutia	Koiranen GP	1:34.265	13
16	16	(United Kingdom) Dean Stoneman	Marussia Manor Racing	1:34.308	16
17	24	(South Africa) Roman de Beer	Trident	1:34.327	17
18	19	(Italy) Riccardo Agostini	Hilmer Motorsport	1:34.346	18
19	21	(Switzerland) Mathéo Tuscher	Jenzer Motorsport	1:34.420	PL^{3}
20	18	(Canada) Nelson Mason	Hilmer Motorsport	1:34.450	19
21	20	(Norway) Pål Varhaug	Jenzer Motorsport	1:34.545	25^{1}
22	17	(Germany) Sebastian Balthasar	Hilmer Motorsport	1:34.569	20
23	28	(Mexico) Alfonso Celis Jr.	Status Grand Prix	1:34.821	21
24	22	(Austria) Christopher Höher	Jenzer Motorsport	1:35.776	22
25	15	(United Kingdom) Ryan Cullen	Marussia Manor Racing	1:35.915	23
26	7	(Spain) Carmen Jordá	Koiranen GP	1:38.632	24

- ^1 Marvin Kirchhöfer and Pål Varhaug were each given a five-place grid penalty for causing a collision in the previous round.
- ^2 Luís Sá Silva was given a five-place grid penalty for overtaking under red flags during free practice.
- ^3 Mathéo Tuscher was required to start from the pitlane for failing to stop at the weighbridge during qualifying.

=== Feature Race ===
Pos.	No.	Driver	Team	Laps	Time/Retired	Grid	Points
1	27	(New Zealand) Richie Stanaway	Status Grand Prix	17	27:36.453	1	25+4
2	26	(United Kingdom) Nick Yelloly	Status Grand Prix	17	+2.606	3	18
3	4	(Romania) Robert Vișoiu	Arden International	17	+2.833	4	15
4	10	(United Kingdom) Alex Lynn	Carlin	17	+3.997	2	12
5	11	(United Kingdom) Emil Bernstorff	Carlin	17	+4.314	6	10
6	5	(Switzerland) Patric Niederhauser	Arden International	17	+5.762	7	8
7	6	(United Kingdom) Jann Mardenborough	Arden International	17	+6.352	11	6+2
8	3	(United Kingdom) Dino Zamparelli	ART Grand Prix	17	+12.039	5	4
9	16	(United Kingdom) Dean Stoneman	Marussia Manor Racing	17	+18.093	16	2
10	8	(Sweden) Jimmy Eriksson	Koiranen GP	17	+18.762	10	1
11	2	(Germany) Marvin Kirchhöfer	ART Grand Prix	17	+20.182	14	
12	9	(Uruguay) Santiago Urrutia	Koiranen GP	17	+20.361	13	
13	14	(Finland) Patrick Kujala	Marussia Manor Racing	17	+21.650	9	
14	1	(Switzerland) Alex Fontana	ART Grand Prix	17	+22.048	8	
15	24	(South Africa) Roman de Beer	Trident	17	+24.933	17	
16	28	(Mexico) Alfonso Celis Jr.	Status Grand Prix	17	+26.700	21	
17	12	(Macau) Luís Sá Silva	Carlin	17	+26.976	15	
18	19	(Italy) Riccardo Agostini	Hilmer Motorsport	17	+27.363	18	
19	18	(Canada) Nelson Mason	Hilmer Motorsport	17	+29.576	19	
20	25	(Australia) Mitchell Gilbert	Trident	17	+30.627	12	
21	20	(Norway) Pål Varhaug	Jenzer Motorsport	17	+30.946	25	
22	21	(Switzerland) Mathéo Tuscher	Jenzer Motorsport	17	+31.655	PL	
23	22	(Austria) Christopher Höher	Jenzer Motorsport	17	+31.922	22	
24	15	(United Kingdom) Ryan Cullen	Marussia Manor Racing	17	+33.168	23	
25	7	(Spain) Carmen Jordá	Koiranen GP	17	+1:12.000	24	
Ret	17	(Germany) Sebastian Balthasar	Hilmer Motorsport	11	Retired	20	
Fastest lap: Jann Mardenborough (Arden International) — 1:36.271 (on lap 13)

=== Sprint Race ===
Pos.	No.	Driver	Team	Laps	Time/Retired	Grid	Points
1	5	(Switzerland) Patric Niederhauser	Arden International	17	27:31.893	3	15+2
2	3	(United Kingdom) Dino Zamparelli	ART Grand Prix	17	+1.504	1	12
3	6	(United Kingdom) Jann Mardenborough	Arden International	17	+7.440	2	10
4	10	(United Kingdom) Alex Lynn	Carlin	17	+8.154	5	8
5	4	(Romania) Robert Vișoiu	Arden International	17	+10.364	6	6
6	27	(New Zealand) Richie Stanaway	Status Grand Prix	17	+16.174	8	4
7	11	(United Kingdom) Emil Bernstorff	Carlin	17	+19.246	4	2
8	16	(United Kingdom) Dean Stoneman	Marussia Manor Racing	17	+22.681	9	1
9	2	(Germany) Marvin Kirchhöfer	ART Grand Prix	17	+22.872	11	
10	14	(Finland) Patrick Kujala	Marussia Manor Racing	17	+23.576	13	
11	26	(United Kingdom) Nick Yelloly	Status Grand Prix	17	+24.172	7	
12	24	(South Africa) Roman de Beer	Trident	17	+25.698	15	
13	1	(Switzerland) Alex Fontana	ART Grand Prix	17	+26.022	14	
14	20	(Norway) Pål Varhaug	Jenzer Motorsport	17	+26.498	21	
15	21	(Switzerland) Mathéo Tuscher	Jenzer Motorsport	17	+27.468	22	
16	8	(Sweden) Jimmy Eriksson	Koiranen GP	17	+30.125	10	
17	17	(Germany) Sebastian Balthasar	Hilmer Motorsport	17	+30.513	26	
18	12	(Macau) Luís Sá Silva	Carlin	17	+30.513	17	
19	19	(Italy) Riccardo Agostini	Hilmer Motorsport	17	+32.967	18	
20	18	(Canada) Nelson Mason	Hilmer Motorsport	17	+33.501	19	
21	15	(United Kingdom) Ryan Cullen	Marussia Manor Racing	17	+33.911	24	
22	28	(Mexico) Alfonso Celis Jr.	Status Grand Prix	17	+35.422	16	
23	22	(Austria) Christopher Höher	Jenzer Motorsport	17	+35.953	23	
24	25	(Australia) Mitchell Gilbert	Trident	17	+44.764	20	
25	7	(Spain) Carmen Jordá	Koiranen GP	17	+55.061	25	
DNF	9	(Uruguay) Santiago Urrutia	Koiranen GP	2	+20.361	12	
Fastest lap: Patric Niederhauser (Arden International) — 1:36.148 (on lap 3)^{1}

- ^1 Mitchell Gilbert set the fastest lap, but did not finish in the top 10, so was ineligible to be the point-scorer for the fastest lap. Patric Niederhauser was the point-scorer instead for setting the fastest lap of those finishing in the top 10.

== Standings after the round ==
Drivers' Championship standings

	Pos.	Driver	Points
	1	(United Kingdom) Alex Lynn	134
3	2	(New Zealand) Richie Stanaway	103
1	3	(Sweden) Jimmy Eriksson	85
	4	(United Kingdom) Emil Bernstorff	85
2	5	(Germany) Marvin Kirchhöfer	80

Teams' Championship standings

	Pos.	Team	Points
	1	(United Kingdom) Carlin	223
	2	(Canada) Status Grand Prix	177
	3	(France) ART Grand Prix	141
2	4	(United Kingdom) Arden International	100
1	5	(Finland) Koiranen GP	85

- Note: Only the top five positions are included for both sets of standings.

== See also ==
- 2014 Hungarian Grand Prix
- 2014 Hungaroring GP2 Series round

Previous round: 2014 Silverstone GP3 Series round	GP3 Series; 2014 season	Next round: 2014 Spa-Francorchamps GP3 Series round
Previous round: 2013 Hungaroring GP3 Series round	Hungaroring GP3 round	Next round: 2015 Hungaroring GP3 Series round
