= 2014 Silverstone GP3 Series round =

(United Kingdom) 2014 Silverstone GP3 round
Round details
- Round 3 of 9 rounds in the 2014 GP3 Series
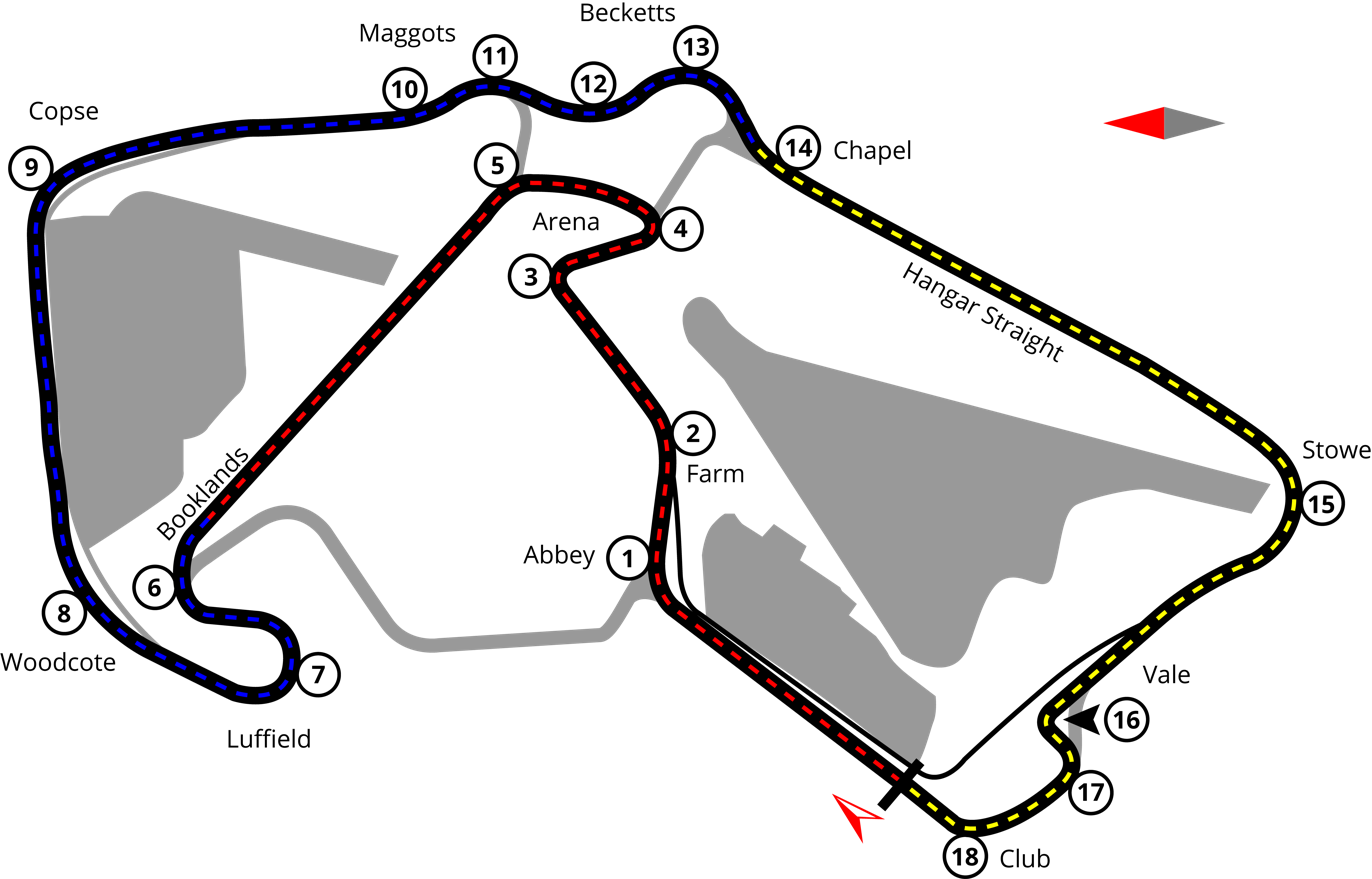
- Silverstone Circuit
- Location: Silverstone Circuit, Northamptonshire and Buckinghamshire, England
- Course: Permanent racing circuit 5.901 km (3.667 mi)

GP3 Series

Race 1
- Date: 5 July 2014
- Laps: 15

Pole position
Driver	(Sweden) Jimmy Eriksson	Koiranen GP
- Time: 2:05.322

Podium
First	(Sweden) Jimmy Eriksson	Koiranen GP
Second	(United Kingdom) Alex Lynn	Carlin
Third	(Germany) Marvin Kirchhöfer	ART Grand Prix

Fastest lap
Driver	(United Kingdom) Alex Lynn	Carlin
- Time: 1:48.963 (on lap 11)

Race 2
- Date: 6 July 2014
- Laps: 15

Podium
First	(New Zealand) Richie Stanaway	Status Grand Prix
Second	(United Kingdom) Nick Yelloly	Status Grand Prix
Third	(United Kingdom) Emil Bernstorff	Carlin

Fastest lap
Driver	(South Africa) Roman de Beer (Note: Roman de Beer set the fastest lap, but did not finish in the top 10, so was ineligible to be the point-scorer for the fastest lap. Richie Stanaway was the point-scorer instead for setting the fastest lap of those finishing in the top 10.)	Trident
- Time: 1:49.360 (on lap 14)

The 2014 Silverstone GP3 Series round was a GP3 Series motor race held on 5 and 6 July 2014 at Silverstone Circuit in Silverstone, United Kingdom. It was the third round of the 2014 GP3 Season. The race supported the 2014 British Grand Prix.

== Classification ==
=== Summary ===
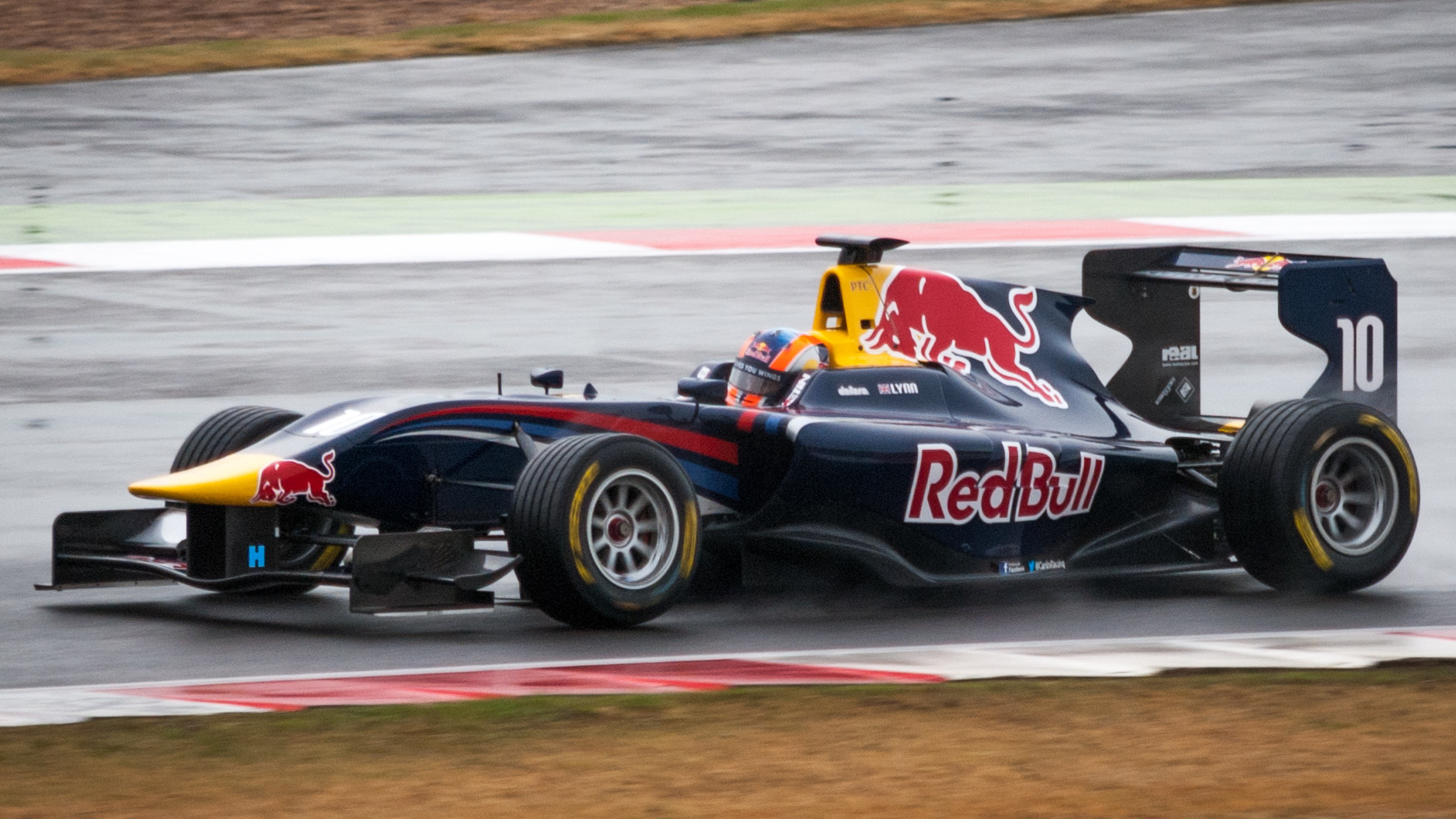
Alex Lynn

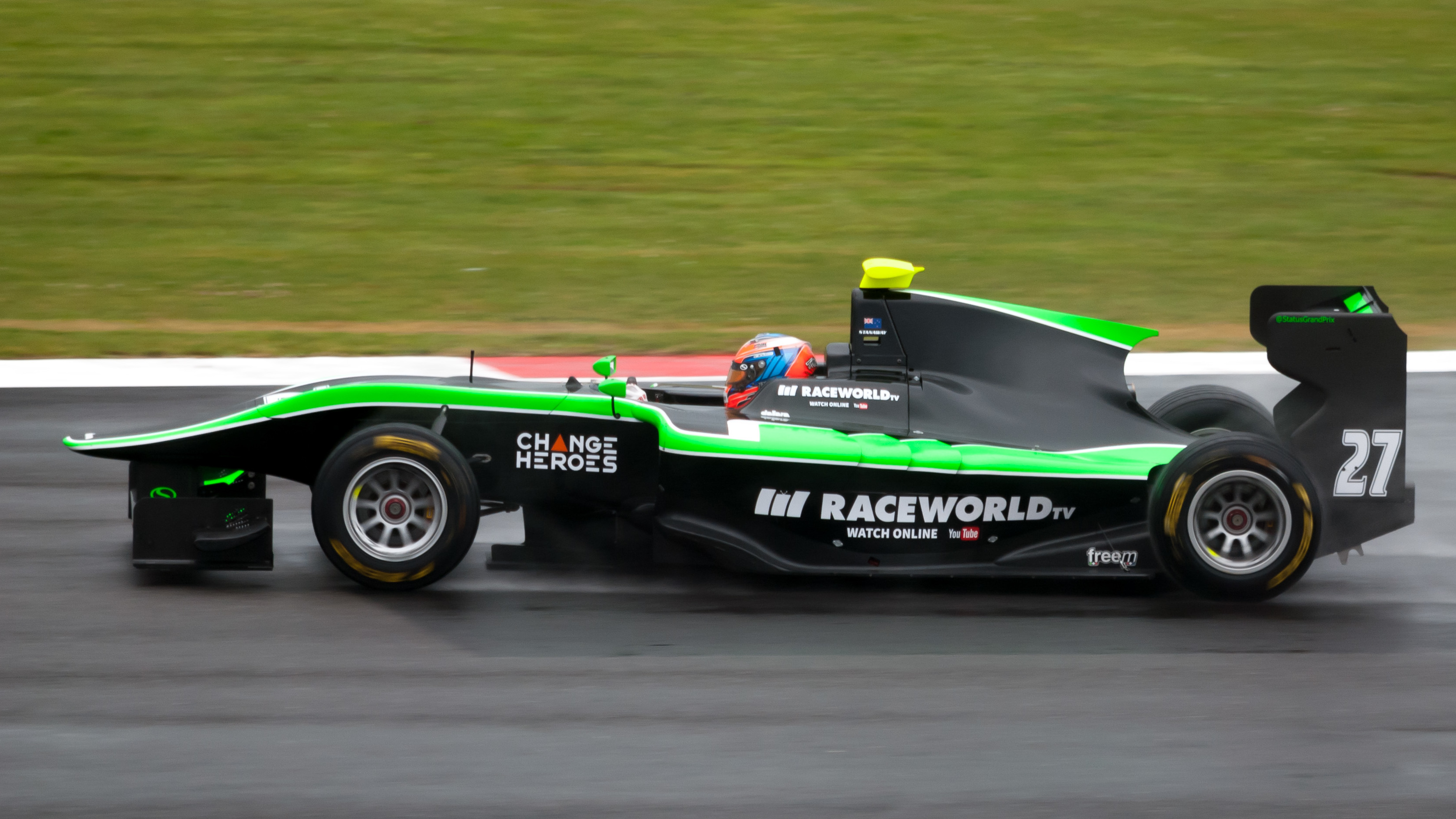
Richie Stanaway

Two changes were made to the starting lineup before the race weekend. Sebastian Balthasar replaced Nikolay Martsenko at Hilmer Motorsport. At Trident, Mitchell Gilbert replaced Denis Nagulin.

In a wet qualifying session, Jimmy Eriksson claimed his maiden pole position, with championship leader Alex Lynn starting alongside him. Jann Mardenborough got the best start from fourth, but was forced wide by Lynn, allowing Eriksson to keep the lead. Lynn fought for the lead in the latter part of the race but Eriksson held him off, converting pole into his maiden win. Marvin Kirchhöfer finished third.

Dino Zamparelli started from reverse grid pole for race 2, but a poor start allowed Richie Stanaway to take the lead. He kept the lead throughout the race to take the win, with Nick Yelloly making it a 1-2 for Status Grand Prix. It was Stanaway's first race win since 2011. Emil Bernstorff completed the podium. Lynn once again remained in the lead of the championship, eight points ahead of Eriksson.

=== Qualifying ===
Pos.	No.	Driver	Team	Time	Grid
1	8	(Sweden) Jimmy Eriksson	Koiranen GP	2:05.322	1
2	10	(United Kingdom) Alex Lynn	Carlin	2:05.638	2
3	2	(Germany) Marvin Kirchhöfer	ART Grand Prix	2:06.385	3
4	3	(United Kingdom) Dino Zamparelli	ART Grand Prix	2:06.392	9^{1}
5	6	(United Kingdom) Jann Mardenborough	Arden International	2:06.430	4
6	11	(United Kingdom) Emil Bernstorff	Carlin	2:06.669	5
7	27	(New Zealand) Richie Stanaway	Status Grand Prix	2:06.704	6
8	26	(United Kingdom) Nick Yelloly	Status Grand Prix	2:06.805	7
9	19	(Italy) Riccardo Agostini	Hilmer Motorsport	2:07.202	8
10	28	(Mexico) Alfonso Celis Jr.	Status Grand Prix	2:07.291	10
11	4	(Romania) Robert Vișoiu	Arden International	2:07.293	11
12	14	(Finland) Patrick Kujala	Marussia Manor Racing	2:07.417	12
13	20	(Norway) Pål Varhaug	Jenzer Motorsport	2:07.490	13
14	1	(Switzerland) Alex Fontana	ART Grand Prix	2:07.585	14
15	21	(Switzerland) Mathéo Tuscher	Jenzer Motorsport	2:07.601	15
16	16	(United Kingdom) Dean Stoneman	Marussia Manor Racing	2:07.613	16
17	24	(South Africa) Roman de Beer	Trident	2:07.753	17
18	12	(Macau) Luís Sá Silva	Carlin	2:07.803	18
19	18	(Canada) Nelson Mason	Hilmer Motorsport	2:08.233	PL^{2}
20	5	(Switzerland) Patric Niederhauser	Arden International	2:08.302	19
21	15	(United Kingdom) Ryan Cullen	Marussia Manor Racing	2:09.570	20
22	22	(Hong Kong) Adderly Fong	Jenzer Motorsport	2:09.647	21
23	9	(Uruguay) Santiago Urrutia	Koiranen GP	2:09.968	22
24	23	(Brazil) Victor Carbone	Trident	2:11.380	23
25	7	(Spain) Carmen Jordá	Koiranen GP	2:13.958	24
26	17	(Germany) Sebastian Balthasar	Hilmer Motorsport	No time	25
27	25	(Australia) Mitchell Gilbert	Trident	No time	WD^{3}

- ^1 Dino Zamparelli was given a five-place grid penalty for overtaking while marshals were working on track.
- ^2 Nelson Mason was required to start from the pitlane for overtaking while marshals were working on track.
- ^3 Mitchell Gilbert was withdrawn from the race weekend following a crash in qualifying that damaged the car's roll hoop.

=== Feature Race ===
Pos.	No.	Driver	Team	Laps	Time/Retired	Grid	Points
1	8	(Sweden) Jimmy Eriksson	Koiranen GP	15	27:32.301	1	25+4
2	10	(United Kingdom) Alex Lynn	Carlin	15	+0.958	2	18+2
3	2	(Germany) Marvin Kirchhöfer	ART Grand Prix	15	+7.150	3	15
4	11	(United Kingdom) Emil Bernstorff	Carlin	15	+9.882	5	12
5	26	(United Kingdom) Nick Yelloly	Status Grand Prix	15	+10.937	7	10
6	19	(Italy) Riccardo Agostini	Hilmer Motorsport	15	+12.774	8	8
7	27	(New Zealand) Richie Stanaway	Status Grand Prix	15	+14.413	6	6
8	3	(United Kingdom) Dino Zamparelli	ART Grand Prix	15	+16.895	9	4
9	6	(United Kingdom) Jann Mardenborough	Arden International	15	+18.661	4	2
10	16	(United Kingdom) Dean Stoneman	Marussia Manor Racing	15	+20.132	16	1
11	20	(Norway) Pål Varhaug	Jenzer Motorsport	15	+24.887	13	
12	14	(Finland) Patrick Kujala	Marussia Manor Racing	15	+25.530	12	
13	5	(Switzerland) Patric Niederhauser	Arden International	15	+28.616	19	
14	21	(Switzerland) Mathéo Tuscher	Jenzer Motorsport	15	+29.400	15	
15	1	(Switzerland) Alex Fontana	ART Grand Prix	15	+29.701	14	
16	28	(Mexico) Alfonso Celis Jr.	Status Grand Prix	15	+33.436	10	
17	24	(South Africa) Roman de Beer	Trident	15	+35.407	17	
18	12	(Macau) Luís Sá Silva	Carlin	15	+39.583	18	
19	15	(United Kingdom) Ryan Cullen	Marussia Manor Racing	15	+46.549	20	
20	4	(Romania) Robert Vișoiu	Arden International	15	+47.035	11	
21	22	(Hong Kong) Adderly Fong	Jenzer Motorsport	15	+47.550	21	
22	17	(Germany) Sebastian Balthasar	Hilmer Motorsport	15	+48.303	25	
23	23	(Brazil) Victor Carbone	Trident	15	+1:10.180	23	
24	7	(Spain) Carmen Jordá	Koiranen GP	15	+1:35.243	24	
25	18	(Canada) Nelson Mason	Hilmer Motorsport	13	+2 laps	PL	
Ret	9	(Uruguay) Santiago Urrutia	Koiranen GP	0	Retired	22	
WD	25	(Australia) Mitchell Gilbert	Trident	0	Withdrawn	WD	
Fastest lap: Alex Lynn (Carlin) — 1:48.963 (on lap 11)

=== Sprint Race ===
Pos.	No.	Driver	Team	Laps	Time/Retired	Grid	Points
1	27	(New Zealand) Richie Stanaway	Status Grand Prix	15	27:39.436	2	10+2
2	26	(United Kingdom) Nick Yelloly	Status Grand Prix	15	+2.737	4	8
3	11	(United Kingdom) Emil Bernstorff	Carlin	15	+7.789	5	6
4	2	(Germany) Marvin Kirchhöfer	ART Grand Prix	15	+14.363	6	5
5	19	(Italy) Riccardo Agostini	Hilmer Motorsport	15	+16.508	3	4
6	10	(United Kingdom) Alex Lynn	Carlin	15	+17.503	7	3
7	3	(United Kingdom) Dino Zamparelli	ART Grand Prix	15	+18.743	1	2
8	21	(Switzerland) Mathéo Tuscher	Jenzer Motorsport	15	+19.748	14	1
9	12	(Macau) Luís Sá Silva	Carlin	15	+21.217	18	
10	28	(Mexico) Alfonso Celis Jr.	Status Grand Prix	15	+27.015	16	
11	22	(Hong Kong) Adderly Fong	Jenzer Motorsport	15	+27.614	21	
12	18	(Canada) Nelson Mason	Hilmer Motorsport	15	+31.684	25	
13	4	(Romania) Robert Vișoiu	Arden International	15	+33.491	20	
14	9	(Uruguay) Santiago Urrutia	Koiranen GP	15	+40.139	26	
15	6	(United Kingdom) Jann Mardenborough	Arden International	15	+41.636	9	
16	24	(South Africa) Roman de Beer	Trident	15	+52.287	17	
17	7	(Spain) Carmen Jordá	Koiranen GP	15	+1:13.076	24	
18	16	(United Kingdom) Dean Stoneman	Marussia Manor Racing	14	+1 lap	10	
Ret	20	(Norway) Pål Varhaug	Jenzer Motorsport	6	Retired	11	
Ret	5	(Switzerland) Patric Niederhauser	Arden International	5	Retired	13	
Ret	8	(Sweden) Jimmy Eriksson	Koiranen GP	5	Retired	8	
Ret	17	(Germany) Sebastian Balthasar	Hilmer Motorsport	1	Retired	22	
Ret	15	(United Kingdom) Ryan Cullen	Marussia Manor Racing	1	Retired	19	
Ret	23	(Brazil) Victor Carbone	Trident	0	Retired	23	
Ret	14	(Finland) Patrick Kujala	Marussia Manor Racing	0	Retired	12	
Ret	1	(Switzerland) Alex Fontana	ART Grand Prix	0	Retired	15	
WD	25	(Australia) Mitchell Gilbert	Trident	0	Withdrawn	WD	
Fastest lap: Roman de Beer (Trident) — 1:49.360 (on lap 14)^{1}

- ^1 Roman de Beer set the fastest lap, but did not finish in the top 10, so was ineligible to be the point-scorer for the fastest lap. Richie Stanaway was the point-scorer instead for setting the fastest lap of those finishing in the top 10.

== Standings after the round ==
Drivers' Championship standings

Pos.	Driver	Points
1	(United Kingdom) Alex Lynn	86
2	(Sweden) Jimmy Eriksson	78
3	(New Zealand) Richie Stanaway	68
4	(United Kingdom) Emil Bernstorff	58
5	(Germany) Marvin Kirchhöfer	49

Teams' Championship standings

Pos.	Team	Points
1	(United Kingdom) Carlin	148
2	(Canada) Status Grand Prix	106
3	(Finland) Koiranen GP	78
4	(France) ART Grand Prix	74
5	(United Kingdom) Marussia Manor Racing	38

- Note: Only the top five positions are included for both sets of standings.

== See also ==
- 2014 British Grand Prix
- 2014 Silverstone GP2 Series round

== Footnotes ==
Previous round: 2014 Red Bull Ring GP3 Series round	GP3 Series; 2014 season	Next round: 2014 Hockenheimring GP3 Series round
Previous round: 2013 Silverstone GP3 Series round	Silverstone GP3 round	Next round: 2015 Silverstone GP3 Series round
