= 2014 Catalunya GP2 Series round =

2014 GP2 race held in Spain

(Spain) 2014 Catalunya GP2 round
Round details
- Round 2 of 12 rounds in the 2014 GP2 Series
- Layout of the Circuit de Catalunya
- Location: Circuit de Catalunya; Montmeló, Spain
- Course: Permanent racing facility 4.665 km (2.892 mi)

GP2 Series

Feature race
- Date: 10 May 2014
- Laps: 37

Pole position
Driver	(Monaco) Stéphane Richelmi	DAMS
- Time: 1:29.293

Podium
First	(Venezuela) Johnny Cecotto Jr.	Trident
Second	(United Kingdom) Jolyon Palmer	DAMS
Third	(Brazil) Felipe Nasr	Carlin

Fastest lap
Driver	(New Zealand) Mitch Evans	RT Russian Time
- Time: 1:34.141 (on lap 31)

Sprint race
- Date: 11 May 2014
- Laps: 26

Podium
First	(Brazil) Felipe Nasr	Carlin
Second	(United Kingdom) Jolyon Palmer	DAMS
Third	(France) Tom Dillmann	Arden International

Fastest lap
Driver	(Netherlands) Daniël de Jong	MP Motorsport
- Time: 1:34.261 (on lap 6)

The 2014 Catalunya GP2 Series round was a pair of motor races held on May 10 and 11, 2014 at the Circuit de Catalunya in Montmeló, Spain as part of the GP2 Series. It was the second round of the 2014 season. The race weekend supported the 2014 Spanish Grand Prix.

Stéphane Richelmi took pole position in the feature race, but Johnny Cecotto Jr. took the victory, ahead of DAMS' Jolyon Palmer and Carlin driver Felipe Nasr finished third. Tom Dillmann finished in eighth position, and thus started on pole for the sprint race. Nasr took his first GP2 Series win in the sprint race, ahead of Palmer and Dillmann.

== Classification ==
=== Qualifying ===
Pos.	No.	Driver	Team	Time	Grid
1	8	(Monaco) Stéphane Richelmi	DAMS	1:29.293	1
2	7	(United Kingdom) Jolyon Palmer	DAMS	1:29.421	2
3	6	(Monaco) Stefano Coletti	Racing Engineering	1:29.514	3
4	5	(Italy) Raffaele Marciello	Racing Engineering	1:29.650	4
5	3	(Brazil) Felipe Nasr	Carlin	1:29.698	5
6	1	(New Zealand) Mitch Evans	RT Russian Time	1:29.703	6
7	4	(Colombia) Julián Leal	Carlin	1:29.841	7
8	19	(United States) Alexander Rossi	EQ8 Caterham Racing	1:29.893	8
9	21	(Cyprus) Tio Ellinas	MP Motorsport	1:29.902	9
10	10	(Belgium) Stoffel Vandoorne	ART Grand Prix	1:29.963	10
11	18	(Indonesia) Rio Haryanto	EQ8 Caterham Racing	1:29.983	11
12	17	(France) Tom Dillmann	Arden International	1:30.289	12
13	26	(France) Arthur Pic	Campos Racing	1:30.300	13
14	11	(Germany) Daniel Abt	Hilmer Motorsport	1:30.412	14
15	24	(France) Nathanaël Berthon	Venezuela GP Lazarus	1:30.470	15
16	23	(Venezuela) Johnny Cecotto Jr.	Trident	1:30:496	16
17	27	(Japan) Kimiya Sato	Campos Racing	1:30.510	17
18	16	(Austria) René Binder	Arden International	1:30.553	18
19	20	(Netherlands) Daniël de Jong	MP Motorsport	1:30.617	19
20	22	(Spain) Sergio Canamasas	Trident	1:30.773	20
21	12	(Argentina) Facu Regalia	Hilmer Motorsport	1:30.790	21
22	14	(United Kingdom) Adrian Quaife-Hobbs	Rapax	1:30:887	22
23	9	(Japan) Takuya Izawa	ART Grand Prix	1:30.903	23
24	15	(Switzerland) Simon Trummer	Rapax	1:30.923	24
25	2	(Russia) Artem Markelov	RT Russian Time	1:31.336	25
26	25	(United States) Conor Daly	Venezuela GP Lazarus	1:31.558	26
Source: Qual.

=== Feature race ===
Pos.	No.	Driver	Team	Laps	Time/Retired	Grid	Points
1	23	(Venezuela) Johnny Cecotto Jr.	Trident	36	1:00:28.853	16	25
2	7	(United Kingdom) Jolyon Palmer	DAMS	36	+3.409	2	18
3	3	(Brazil) Felipe Nasr	Carlin	36	+3.750	5	15
4	4	(Colombia) Julián Leal	Carlin	36	+6.128	7	14 (12+2)
5	18	(Indonesia) Rio Haryanto	EQ8 Caterham Racing	36	+15.895	11	10
6	26	(France) Arthur Pic	Campos Racing	36	+16.842	13	8
7	21	(Cyprus) Tio Ellinas	MP Motorsport	36	+18.407	9	6
8	17	(France) Tom Dillmann	Arden International	36	+20.556	12	4
9	14	(United Kingdom) Adrian Quaife-Hobbs	Rapax	36	+21.265	22	2
10	8	(Monaco) Stéphane Richelmi	DAMS	36	+21.460	1	5 (1+4)
11	2	(Russia) Artem Markelov	RT Russian Time	36	+22.233	25	
12	15	(Switzerland) Simon Trummer	Rapax	36	+22.804	24	
13	10	(Belgium) Stoffel Vandoorne	ART Grand Prix	36	+23.397	10	
14	1	(New Zealand) Mitch Evans	RT Russian Time	36	+23.630	6	
15	16	(Austria) René Binder	Arden International	36	+17.682^{1}	18	
16	6	(Monaco) Stefano Coletti	Racing Engineering	36	+21.847^{2}	3	
17	22	(Spain) Sergio Canamasas	Trident	36	+42.769	20	
18	25	(United States) Conor Daly	Venezuela GP Lazarus	36	+25.145^{1}	26	
19	27	(Japan) Kimiya Sato	Campos Racing	36	+48.653	17	
20	9	(Japan) Takuya Izawa	ART Grand Prix	36	+52.965	23	
Ret	20	(Netherlands) Daniël de Jong	MP Motorsport	26	Did not finish	19	
Ret	19	(United States) Alexander Rossi	EQ8 Caterham Racing	18	Did not finish	8	
Ret	24	(France) Nathanaël Berthon	Venezuela GP Lazarus	4	Did not finish	15	
Ret	11	(Germany) Daniel Abt	Hilmer Motorsport	1	Did not finish	14	
Ret	5	(Italy) Raffaele Marciello	Racing Engineering	0	Did not finish	4	
Ret	12	(Argentina) Facu Regalia	Hilmer Motorsport	0	Did not finish	21	
Fastest lap: Mitch Evans (Arden International) — 1:34.341 (on lap 31)
Source: Feat.

Notes:

- ^1 — René Binder and Conor Daly finished the race in seventh and seventeenth place respectively, but had twenty seconds added to their race time in lieu of failure to slow down under yellow flags during the event.
- ^2 — Stefano Coletti finished the race in twelfth place, but had twenty seconds added to his race time because he went off track under double yellow flags, compromising the marshal's safety.

=== Sprint race ===
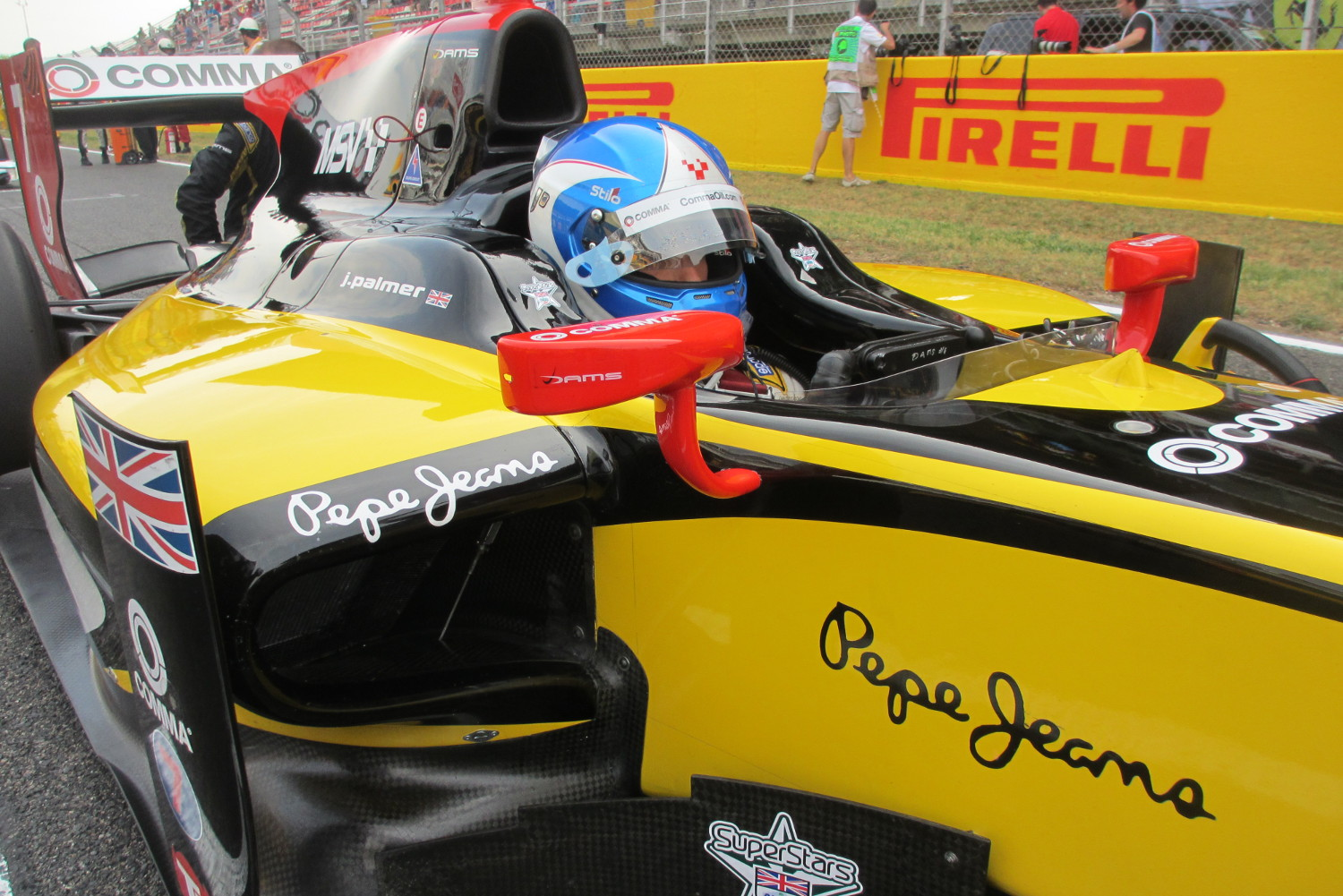
Jolyon Palmer

Pos.	No.	Driver	Team	Laps	Time/Retired	Grid	Points
1	3	(Brazil) Felipe Nasr	Carlin	26	42:01.901	6	15
2	7	(United Kingdom) Jolyon Palmer	DAMS	26	+7.635	7	14 (12+2)
3	17	(France) Tom Dillmann	Arden International	26	+13.814	1	10
4	26	(France) Arthur Pic	Campos Racing	26	+14.172	3	8
5	4	(Colombia) Julián Leal	Carlin	26	+14.732	5	6
6	23	(Venezuela) Johnny Cecotto Jr.	Trident	26	+18.842	8	4
7	8	(Monaco) Stéphane Richelmi	DAMS	26	+19.236	10	2
8	6	(Monaco) Stefano Coletti	Racing Engineering	26	+22.293	16	1
9	14	(United Kingdom) Adrian Quaife-Hobbs	Rapax	26	+30.744	9	
10	10	(Belgium) Stoffel Vandoorne	ART Grand Prix	26	+31.379	13	
11	21	(Cyprus) Tio Ellinas	MP Motorsport	26	+31.839	2	
12	11	(Germany) Daniel Abt	Hilmer Motorsport	26	+32.142	24	
13	9	(Japan) Takuya Izawa	ART Grand Prix	26	+33.3131	20	
14	19	(United States) Alexander Rossi	EQ8 Caterham Racing	26	+34.189	22	
15	27	(Japan) Kimiya Sato	Campos Racing	36	+37.025	19	
16	5	(Italy) Raffaele Marciello	Racing Engineering	26	+38.689	25	
17	12	(Argentina) Facu Regalia	Hilmer Motorsport	26	+39.975	26	
18	22	(Spain) Sergio Canamasas	Trident	26	+44.122	17	
19	20	(Netherlands) Daniël de Jong	MP Motorsport	26	+74.656	21^{3}	
20	1	(New Zealand) Mitch Evans	RT Russian Time	24	Did not finish	14	
Ret	16	(Austria) René Binder	Arden International	2	Did not finish	18	
Ret	24	(France) Nathanaël Berthon	Venezuela GP Lazarus	2	Did not finish	8	
Ret	2	(Russia) Artem Markelov	RT Russian Time	2	Did not finish	11	
Ret	15	(Switzerland) Simon Trummer	Rapax	1	Did not finish	12	
Ret	25	(United States) Conor Daly	Venezuela GP Lazarus	1	Did not finish	18	
Ret	18	(Indonesia) Rio Haryanto	EQ8 Caterham Racing	0	Did not finish	4	
Fastest lap: Daniël de Jong (MP Motorsport) — 1:34.261 (on lap 6)
Source: Sprint

Notes:

- ^3 — Daniël de Jong started the race from the pit lane after his car was released in an unsafe condition in the feature race.

== Standings after the round ==
Drivers' Championship standings

	Pos	Driver	Points
	1	(United Kingdom) Jolyon Palmer	70
	2	(Colombia) Julián Leal	48
2	3	(Brazil) Felipe Nasr	42
9	4	(Venezuela) Johnny Cecotto Jr.	29
9	5	(France) Arthur Pic	26

Teams' Championship standings

	Pos	Team	Points
1	1	(United Kingdom) Carlin	90
1	2	(France) DAMS	83
	3	(France) ART Grand Prix	33
5	4	(Italy) Trident	29
1	5	(Spain) Campos Racing	26

- Note: Only the top five positions are included for both sets of standings.

== See also ==
- 2014 Spanish Grand Prix
- 2014 Catalunya GP3 Series round

Previous round: 2014 Bahrain GP2 Series round	GP2 Series; 2014 season	Next round: 2014 Monaco GP2 Series round
Previous round: 2013 Catalunya GP2 Series round	Catalunya GP2 round	Next round: 2015 Catalunya GP2 Series round
