= 2014 Red Bull Ring GP2 Series round =

2014 Austria GP2 round
Round details
- Round 4 of 12 rounds in the 2014 GP2 Series
- Layout of the Red Bull Ring
- Location: Red Bull Ring; Spielberg, Austria
- Course: Permanent racing facility 4.326 km (2.688 mi)

GP2 Series

Feature race
- Date: 21 June 2014
- Laps: 40

Pole position
Driver	(Venezuela) Johnny Cecotto Jr.	Trident
- Time: 1:15.312

Podium
First	(Brazil) Felipe Nasr	Carlin
Second	(Belgium) Stoffel Vandoorne	ART Grand Prix
Third	(Italy) Raffaele Marciello	Racing Engineering

Fastest lap
Driver	(Brazil) Felipe Nasr	Carlin
- Time: 1:16.093 (on lap 35)

Sprint race
- Date: 22 June 2014
- Laps: 28

Podium
First	(Venezuela) Johnny Cecotto Jr.	Trident
Second	(Monaco) Stefano Coletti	Racing Engineering
Third	(Italy) Raffaele Marciello	Racing Engineering

Fastest lap
Driver	(Monaco) Stefano Coletti	Racing Engineering
- Time: 1:16.629 (on lap 22)

The 2014 Austria GP2 Series round was a GP2 Series motor race held on June 21 and 22, 2014 at the Red Bull Ring in Spielberg, Austria. It was the fourth round of the 2014 GP2 Series. The race weekend supported the 2014 Austrian Grand Prix.

== Classification ==
=== Qualifying ===
Pos.	No.	Driver	Team	Time	Grid
1	23	(Venezuela) Johnny Cecotto Jr.	Trident Racing	1:15:312	1
2	7	(United Kingdom) Jolyon Palmer	DAMS	1:15.352	2
3	3	(Brazil) Felipe Nasr	Carlin	1:15.358	3
4	6	(Monaco) Stefano Coletti	Racing Engineering	1:15.443	4
5	5	(Italy) Raffaele Marciello	Racing Engineering	1:15.449	5
6	10	(Belgium) Stoffel Vandoorne	ART Grand Prix	1:15.481	6
7	26	(France) Arthur Pic	Campos Racing	1:15.608	7
8	1	(New Zealand) Mitch Evans	RT Russian Time	1:15.614	8
9	19	(United States) Alexander Rossi	EQ8 Caterham Racing	1:15.644	9
10	8	(Monaco) Stéphane Richelmi	DAMS	1:15.664	10
11	17	(Brazil) André Negrão	Arden International	1:15.773	11
12	4	(Colombia) Julián Leal	Carlin	1:15.784	12
13	18	(Indonesia) Rio Haryanto	EQ8 Caterham Racing	1:15.811	13
14	14	(United Kingdom) Adrian Quaife-Hobbs	Rapax	1:15:927	14
15	21	(Cyprus) Tio Ellinas	MP Motorsport	1:15.964	15
16	22	(Spain) Sergio Canamasas	Trident Racing	1:16.034	16
17	9	(Japan) Takuya Izawa	ART Grand Prix	1:16.092	17
18	2	(Russia) Artem Markelov	RT Russian Time	1:16.136	18
19	11	(Germany) Daniel Abt	Hilmer Motorsport	1:16.246	19
20	27	(Japan) Kimiya Sato	Campos Racing	1:16.274	20
21	16	(Austria) René Binder	Arden International	1:16.331	21
22	20	(Netherlands) Daniël de Jong	MP Motorsport	1:16.334	22
23	12	(Argentina) Facu Regalia	Hilmer Motorsport	1:16.497	23
24	15	(Switzerland) Simon Trummer	Rapax	1:16.531	24
25	25	(United States) Conor Daly	Venezuela GP Lazarus	1:16.539	25
26	24	(France) Nathanaël Berthon	Venezuela GP Lazarus	1:16.654	26

=== Feature race ===
Pos.	No.	Driver	Team	Laps	Time/Retired	Grid	Points
1	3	(Brazil) Felipe Nasr	Carlin	40	52:32.096	3	27 (25+2)
2	10	(Belgium) Stoffel Vandoorne	ART Grand Prix	40	+3.874	6	18
3	5	(Italy) Raffaele Marciello	Racing Engineering	40	+4.573	5	15
4	6	(Monaco) Stefano Coletti	Racing Engineering	40	+7.210	4	12
5	7	(United Kingdom) Jolyon Palmer	DAMS	40	+8.902	2	10
6	23	(Venezuela) Johnny Cecotto Jr.	Trident Racing	40	+10.319	1	12 (8+4)
7	1	(New Zealand) Mitch Evans	RT Russian Time	40	+14.924	8	6
8	19	(United States) Alexander Rossi	EQ8 Caterham Racing	40	+20.994	9	4
9	9	(Japan) Takuya Izawa	ART Grand Prix	40	+28.182	17	2
10	26	(France) Arthur Pic	Campos Racing	40	+30.170	7	1
11	18	(Indonesia) Rio Haryanto	EQ8 Caterham Racing	40	+31.941	13	
12	16	(Austria) René Binder	Arden International	40	+36.021	21	
13	4	(Colombia) Julián Leal	Carlin	40	+36.210	12	
14	8	(Monaco) Stéphane Richelmi	DAMS	40	+39.181	10	
15	22	(Spain) Sergio Canamasas	Trident Racing	40	+47.308	16	
16	17	(Brazil) André Negrão	Arden International	40	+48.070	11	
17	11	(Germany) Daniel Abt	Hilmer Motorsport	40	+38.758	19	
18	25	(United States) Conor Daly	Venezuela GP Lazarus	40	+49.656	25	
19	20	(Netherlands) Daniël de Jong	MP Motorsport	40	+59.859	22	
20	15	(Switzerland) Simon Trummer	Rapax	40	+63.480	24	
21	2	(Russia) Artem Markelov	RT Russian Time	40	+69.877	18	
22	24	(France) Nathanaël Berthon	Venezuela GP Lazarus	40	+76.111	26	
23	21	(Cyprus) Tio Ellinas	MP Motorsport	40	+56.369	15	
24	14	(United Kingdom) Adrian Quaife-Hobbs	Rapax	38	+2 laps	14	
Ret	12	(Argentina) Facu Regalia	Hilmer Motorsport	28	Did not finish	23	
Ret	27	(Japan) Kimiya Sato	Campos Racing	1	Did not finish	20	
Fastest lap: Felipe Nasr (Carlin) — 1:16.093 (on lap 35)

=== Sprint race ===
Pos.	No.	Driver	Team	Laps	Time/Retired	Grid	Points
1	23	(Venezuela) Johnny Cecotto Jr.	Trident Racing	28	36:14.395	3	15
2	6	(Monaco) Stefano Coletti	Racing Engineering	28	+0.742	5	14 (12+2)
3	5	(Italy) Raffaele Marciello	Racing Engineering	28	+6.813	6	10
4	1	(New Zealand) Mitch Evans	RT Russian Time	28	+7.139	2	8
5	19	(United States) Alexander Rossi	EQ8 Caterham Racing	28	+7.990	1	6
6	7	(United Kingdom) Jolyon Palmer	DAMS	28	+8.828	4	4
7	4	(Colombia) Julián Leal	Carlin	28	+9.317	13	2
8	9	(Japan) Takuya Izawa	ART Grand Prix	28	+19.410	9	1
9	22	(Spain) Sergio Canamasas	Trident Racing	28	+26.716	15	
10	8	(Monaco) Stéphane Richelmi	DAMS	28	+27.062	14	
11	25	(United States) Conor Daly	Venezuela GP Lazarus	28	+27.625	18	
12	16	(Austria) René Binder	Arden International	28	+28.381	12	
13	26	(France) Arthur Pic	Campos Racing	28	+28.861	10	
14	17	(Brazil) André Negrão	Arden International	28	+30.084	16	
15	10	(Belgium) Stoffel Vandoorne	ART Grand Prix	28	+30.446	7	
16	2	(Russia) Artem Markelov	RT Russian Time	28	+32.025	21	
17	18	(Indonesia) Rio Haryanto	EQ8 Caterham Racing	28	+36.046	11	
18	14	(United Kingdom) Adrian Quaife-Hobbs	Rapax	28	+37.139	24	
19	27	(Japan) Kimiya Sato	Campos Racing	28	+37.901	26	
20	15	(Switzerland) Simon Trummer	Rapax	28	+42.508	20	
21	20	(Netherlands) Daniël de Jong	MP Motorsport	28	+43.754	19	
22	21	(Cyprus) Tio Ellinas	MP Motorsport	28	+45.236	23	
23	11	(Germany) Daniel Abt	Hilmer Motorsport	28	+45.606	17	
24	12	(Argentina) Facu Regalia	Hilmer Motorsport	28	+46.924	25	
25	24	(France) Nathanaël Berthon	Venezuela GP Lazarus	28	+50.361	22	
Ret	3	(Brazil) Felipe Nasr	Carlin	2	Retirement	8	
Fastest lap: Stefano Coletti (Racing Engineering) — 1:16.629 (on lap 22)

== See also ==
- 2014 Austrian Grand Prix
- 2014 Red Bull Ring GP3 Series round

Previous round: 2014 Monaco GP2 Series round	GP2 Series; 2014 season	Next round: 2014 Silverstone GP2 Series round
Previous round: 2003 A1-Ring F3000 round	Austria GP2 round	Next round: 2015 Red Bull Ring GP2 Series round
