= Hilmer Motorsport =

German racing team

(Germany) Hilmer Motorsport
- Founded: 2013
- Founder(s): Franz Hilmer
- Folded: 2018
- Base: Niederwinkling, Germany
- Team principal(s): Franz Hilmer
- Former series: GP2 Series; GP3 Series
- Website: http://www.hilmer-motorsport.com/

Hilmer Motorsport was a German racing team established in 2013 by Franz Hilmer. The team first raced in the GP2 Series, starting in 2013, replacing Ocean Racing Technology.

Hilmer joined the GP3 Series in 2014 with support from Force India, replacing the Russian Time entry after the outfit pulled out after the death of founder Igor Mazepa in February 2014.

== GP2 Series ==
=== Season 2013 ===
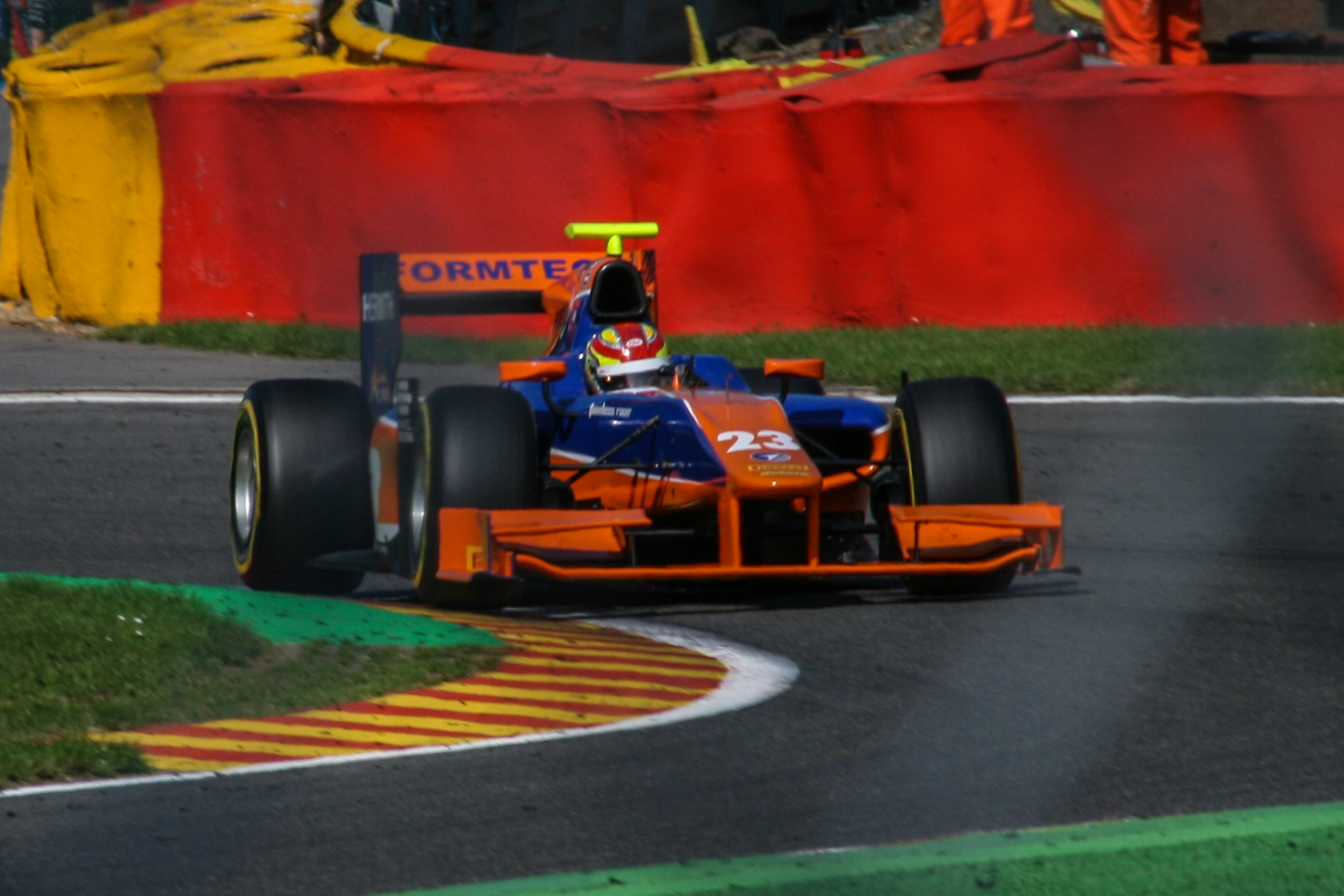
Robin Frijns Qualifying in 2013 Spa-Francorchamps GP2 Series round

Hilmer Motorsport was founded by the German Franz Hilmer and took over the starting position from Ocean Racing Technology. Franz Hilmer is the owner of the company Formtech GmbH, which, among other things, works as a supplier to Formula 1 teams in motorsport.

The team started the season with drivers Conor Daly and Pål Varhaug. While Varhaug had already competed in the GP2 series for a season in 2011, Daly was a rookie and came from the GP3 series. After just one weekend and although Daly scored the first points for Hilmer in the second race in Malaysia, Daly was replaced by Robin Frijns who won the Formula Renault 3.5 championship title in 2012. Frijns initially only signed for the race in Bahrain. After the race weekend in Bahrain, Varhaug was also replaced. He was replaced by Jon Lancaster, who had already competed in a race for Ocean Racing Technology in the 2012 season. Frijns kept his cockpit for the time being, but only signed race by race. The team achieved its first victory on the third weekend at the Circuit de Catalunya in Barcelona. Frijns won ahead of Felipe Nasr and his teammate Lancaster. In the sprint race the following day, Frijns finished second, starting from eighth position. After three more race weekends, Frijns was replaced in Hungary by Adrian Quaife-Hobbs, who had previously competed for MP Motorsport the season. Quaife-Hobbs finished the season with Hilmer, his best result of the season was a victory in the sprint race in Monza. Jon Lancaster was replaced once by Frijns after five race weekends, but got the cockpit back and drove the remaining three race weekends.

At the end of the season, Hilmer Motorsport had scored 155 points and was in sixth place in the team standings.

=== Season 2014 ===
In November 2013, Hilmer announced Daniel Abt, who previously drove for ART Grand Prix in the GP2 series, as the first driver for the 2014 season. At the beginning of February, Hilmer confirmed Facu Regalía as the second driver. Regalia had finished second in the GP3 series the season before. In addition, the team will be cooperating with Force India from the 2014 season and will be competing with their livery.

The start of the season didn't go well for the team: neither driver scored any points in the first four events. Regalia was replaced by Jon Lancaster for the fifth event until the end of the season. After Abt secured the first point in the fifth run, four more points placements were added after a pointless event. In the sprint race in Spa-Francorchamps, Belgium, Abt was on pole position and crossed the finish line in fifth place. At the final round of the season, Nicholas Latifi replaced Abt, who was competing in Formula E due to a scheduling conflict.

The team finished the season in second-to-last place in the team standings with 33 points.

=== Season 2015 ===
Hilmer Motorsport elected to miss the Bahrain round as they were unable to acquire the services of a driver who could bring financial backing to the team. Team principal Franz Hilmer was confident that he would enter the second round of the season in Catalunya.

== GP3 Series ==
=== Season 2014 ===
In mid-March 2014, Hilmer Motorsport announced that it was taking over Bamboo Engineering's starting position in the GP3 series. As in the GP2 series, the GP3 commitment is part of Force India's funding program. At the beginning of April, Hilmer announced Iwan Taranow as the first driver. Beitske Visser and Nelson Mason also made their debuts at the season opener.

After the first event, Taranow and Visser were replaced by Nikolai Marzenko and Riccardo Agostini. Agostini finished the season with Hilmer, while Marzenko was replaced by Sebastian Balthasar after one event. Balthasar drove in five runs for Hilmer. Marzenko took over its cockpit for one run. In the ninth and final run, Hilmer only competed with two cars. Only Agostini managed to score points throughout the season and Hilmer ended his involvement in the GP3 series after one season.

Hilmer finished the team ranking in penultimate place with 18 points.

== Results ==
=== GP2 Series ===
Year	Chassis	Engine	Tyres	Drivers	Races	Wins	Poles	F.L.	Points	D.C.	T.C.
2013	Dallara; GP2/11	Mecachrome; V8108 V8	P	(Netherlands) Robin Frijns	12	1	0	0	47	15th	6th
2013	Dallara; GP2/11	Mecachrome; V8108 V8	P	(United Kingdom) Jon Lancaster	16	2	0	2	73	11th	6th
2013	Dallara; GP2/11	Mecachrome; V8108 V8	P	(United Kingdom) Adrian Quaife-Hobbs (Note: Adrian Quaife-Hobbs raced for MP Motorsport for 12 races in 2013 scoring 23 of his 56 points.)	10	1	0	0	56	13th	6th
2013	Dallara; GP2/11	Mecachrome; V8108 V8	P	(United States) Conor Daly	2	0	0	0	2	26th	6th
2013	Dallara; GP2/11	Mecachrome; V8108 V8	P	(Norway) Pål Varhaug	4	0	0	0	0	31st	6th
2014	Dallara; GP2/11	Mecachrome; V8108 V8	P	(Germany) Daniel Abt	20	0	0	0	16	27th	12th
2014	Dallara; GP2/11	Mecachrome; V8108 V8	P	(Argentina) Facu Regalia	8	0	0	0	0	31st	12th
2014	Dallara; GP2/11	Mecachrome; V8108 V8	P	(Canada) Nicholas Latifi	2	0	0	0	0	32nd	12th
2014	Dallara; GP2/11	Mecachrome; V8108 V8	P	(United Kingdom) Jon Lancaster (Note: Jon Lancaster raced for MP Motorsport for 2 races in 2014.)	16	0	0	0	6	23rd	12th
2015	Dallara; GP2/11	Mecachrome; V8108 V8	P	(United Kingdom) Nick Yelloly	9	0	0	0	19	15th	11th
2015	Dallara; GP2/11	Mecachrome; V8108 V8	P	(Venezuela) Johnny Cecotto Jr.	4	0	0	0	0	26th	11th
2015	Dallara; GP2/11	Mecachrome; V8108 V8	P	(United Kingdom) Jon Lancaster	2	0	0	0	0	28th	11th
2015	Dallara; GP2/11	Mecachrome; V8108 V8	P	(Switzerland) Simon Trummer	2	0	0	0	0	30th	11th
2015	Dallara; GP2/11	Mecachrome; V8108 V8	P	(Spain) Sergio Canamasas (Note: Sergio Canamasas raced for MP Motorsport in 2015 and scores 23 points.)	1	0	0	0	23	12th	11th

=== In detail ===
(key) (Races in bold indicate pole position) (Races in italics indicate fastest lap)

Year	Chassis Engine Tyres	Drivers	1	2	3	4	5	6	7	8	9	10	11	12	13	14	15	16	17	18	19	20	21	22	T.C.	Points
2013	GP2/11; Mecachrome; **P**		SEP; FEA	SEP; SPR	BHR; FEA	BHR; SPR	CAT; FEA	CAT; SPR	MON; FEA	MON; SPR	SIL; FEA	SIL; SPR	NÜR; FEA	NÜR; SPR	HUN; FEA	HUN; SPR	SPA; FEA	SPA; SPR	MNZ; FEA	MNZ; SPR	MRN; FEA	MRN; SPR	YMC; FEA	YMC; SPR	6th	155
2013	GP2/11; Mecachrome; **P**	(United States) Conor Daly	13	7																					6th	155
2013	GP2/11; Mecachrome; **P**	(Netherlands) Robin Frijns			21	23	1	2	Ret	15	13	Ret	6	Ret			9	Ret							6th	155
2013	GP2/11; Mecachrome; **P**	(United Kingdom) Adrian Quaife-Hobbs													18	Ret	10	3	7	1	22	8	11	21^{†}	6th	155
2013	GP2/11; Mecachrome; **P**	(Norway) Pål Varhaug	15	19	Ret	21																			6th	155
2013	GP2/11; Mecachrome; **P**	(United Kingdom) Jon Lancaster					3	10	12	17	5	1	7	1	23	18			13	17	9	5	Ret	Ret	6th	155
2014	GP2/11; Mecachrome; **P**		BHR; FEA	BHR; SPR	CAT; FEA	CAT; SPR	MON; FEA	MON; SPR	RBR; FEA	RBR; SPR	SIL; FEA	SIL; SPR	HOC; FEA	HOC; SPR	HUN; FEA	HUN; SPR	SPA; FEA	SPA; SPR	MNZ; FEA	MNZ; SPR	SOC; FEA	SOC; SPR	YMC; FEA	YMC; SPR	12th	33
2014	GP2/11; Mecachrome; **P**	(Germany) Daniel Abt	13	13	Ret	12	Ret	17	17	23	10	11	20	15	5	5	8	5	Ret	10	Ret	13			12th	33
2014	GP2/11; Mecachrome; **P**	(Canada) Nicholas Latifi																					22	17	12th	33
2014	GP2/11; Mecachrome; **P**	(Argentina) Facu Regalia	Ret	20	Ret	17	Ret	21	Ret	24															12th	33
2014	GP2/11; Mecachrome; **P**	(United Kingdom) Jon Lancaster									22	13	Ret	5	17	16	19	Ret	12	15	12	16	18	14	12th	33
2015	GP2/11; Mecachrome; **P**		BHR; FEA	BHR; SPR	CAT; FEA	CAT; SPR	MON; FEA	MON; SPR	RBR; FEA	RBR; SPR	SIL; FEA	SIL; SPR	HUN; FEA	HUN; SPR	SPA; FEA	SPA; SPR	MNZ; FEA	MNZ; SPR	SOC; FEA	SOC; SPR	BHR; FEA	BHR; SPR	YMC; FEA	YMC; SPR	13th	19
2015	GP2/11; Mecachrome; **P**	(United Kingdom) Nick Yelloly			Ret	14	10	9	8	Ret	7	5	Ret	17	Ret	17									13th	19
2015	GP2/11; Mecachrome; **P**	(Venezuela) Johnny Cecotto Jr.			21	Ret	20	Ret																	13th	19
2015	GP2/11; Mecachrome; **P**	(Switzerland) Simon Trummer							22	18							16	16							13th	19
2015	GP2/11; Mecachrome; **P**	(United Kingdom) Jon Lancaster									16	17													13th	19
2015	GP2/11; Mecachrome; **P**	(Spain) Sergio Canamasas											Ret	16											13th	19

=== GP3 Series ===
Year	Car	Engine	Tyres	Drivers	Races	Wins	Poles	F.L.	Points	D.C.	T.C.
2014	Dallara; GP3/13	AER V6	P	(Russia) Ivan Taranov	2	0	0	0	0	34th	8th
2014	Dallara; GP3/13	AER V6	P	(Canada) Nelson Mason	18	0	0	0	0	22nd	8th
2014	Dallara; GP3/13	AER V6	P	(Netherlands) Beitske Visser	2	0	0	0	0	27th	8th
2014	Dallara; GP3/13	AER V6	P	(Russia) Nikolay Martsenko	4	0	0	0	0	33rd	8th
2014	Dallara; GP3/13	AER V6	P	(Germany) Sebastian Balthasar	12	0	0	0	0	32nd	8th
2014	Dallara; GP3/13	AER V6	P	(Italy) Riccardo Agostini	16	0	0	0	16	18th	8th

=== In detail ===
(key) (Races in bold indicate pole position) (Races in italics indicate fastest lap)

Year	Chassis Engine Tyres	Drivers	1	2	3	4	5	6	7	8	9	10	11	12	13	14	15	16	17	18	T.C.	Points
2014	GP3/13; AER; **P**		CAT; FEA	CAT; SPR	RBR; FEA	RBR; SPR	SIL; FEA	SIL; SPR	HOC; FEA	HOC; SPR	HUN; FEA	HUN; SPR	SPA; FEA	SPA; SPR	MNZ; FEA	MNZ; SPR	SOC; FEA	SOC; SPR	YMC; FEA	YMC; SPR	8th	18
2014	GP3/13; AER; **P**	(Russia) Ivan Taranov	22^{†}	20																	8th	18
2014	GP3/13; AER; **P**	(Russia) Nikolay Martsenko			19	DNS											19	Ret			8th	18
2014	GP3/13; AER; **P**	(Germany) Sebastian Balthasar					22	Ret	24	21	Ret	17	19^{†}	DNS	Ret	DNS					8th	18
2014	GP3/13; AER; **P**	(Canada) Nelson Mason	17	Ret	14	16	25	12	16	14	19	20	15	10	Ret	18	15	DNS	17	18^{†}	8th	18
2014	GP3/13; AER; **P**	(Netherlands) Beitske Visser	19	15																	8th	18
2014	GP3/13; AER; **P**	(Italy) Riccardo Agostini			Ret	11	6	5	9	8	18	19	10	12	15	12	11	Ret	18	13	8th	18
