= 2013 Catalunya GP2 Series round =

2013 GP2 race held in Spain

(Spain) 2013 Catalunya GP2 round
Round details
- Round 3 of 11 rounds in the 2013 GP2 Series
- Circuit de Catalunya
- Location: Circuit de Catalunya; Montmeló, Spain
- Course: Permanent racing facility 4.665 km (2.892 mi)

GP2 Series

Feature race
- Date: 11 May 2013
- Laps: 37

Pole position
Driver	(Sweden) Marcus Ericsson	DAMS
- Time: 1:28.706

Podium
First	(Netherlands) Robin Frijns	Hilmer Motorsport
Second	(Brazil) Felipe Nasr	Carlin
Third	(United Kingdom) Jon Lancaster	Hilmer Motorsport

Fastest lap
Driver	(United Kingdom) Jon Lancaster	Hilmer Motorsport
- Time: 1:34.352 (on lap 9)

Sprint race
- Date: 12 May 2013
- Laps: 26

Podium
First	(Monaco) Stefano Coletti	Rapax
Second	(Netherlands) Robin Frijns	Hilmer Motorsport
Third	(Brazil) Felipe Nasr	Carlin

Fastest lap
Driver	(Monaco) Stefano Coletti	Rapax
- Time: 1:33.727 (on lap 3)

The 2013 Catalunya GP2 Series round was a GP2 Series motor race held at the Circuit de Catalunya in Montmeló, Spain on 11 and 12 May 2013 as the fourth round of the 2013 GP2 Series season. The race was used to support the 2013 Spanish Grand Prix.

Robin Frijns took his—and team Hilmer Motorsports'—maiden GP2 Series victory in the feature race, ahead of Felipe Nasr. Stefano Coletti took his second race win of the season in the sprint race, beating Frijns by six-tenths of a second and further secured his championship lead with the result.

== Background ==
The 2013 Catalunya GP2 Series round was the third of eleven scheduled events in the 2013 GP2 Series. It was held on 11 and 12 May 2013 at the Circuit de Catalunya in Montmeló, Catalonia and supported the 2013 Spanish Grand Prix. Tyre supplier Pirelli brought the brought the yellow-banded soft compound tyres and the orange-banded hard dry compound tyres to the race.

Going into the event, Rapax driver Stefano Coletti led the Drivers' Championship with 64 championship points, ten more than the second-placed Fabio Leimer of Racing Engineering. Carlin's Felipe Nasr, Russian Time's Sam Bird and ART Grand Prix's James Calado were in positions third to fifth, with a respective 48, 33 and 24 championship points. Rapax on 72 championship points led Rapax by two championship points in the Teams' Championship. Racing Engineering, Russian Time, and ART Grand Prix made up places three to five with 64, 45 and 26 championship points. respectively.

== Classification ==
=== Qualifying ===
Pos.	No.	Driver	Team	Time	Grid
1	1	(Sweden) Marcus Ericsson	DAMS	1:28.706	1
2	2	(Monaco) Stéphane Richelmi	DAMS	1:28.871	2
3	9	(Brazil) Felipe Nasr	Carlin	1:29.152	3
4	11	(United Kingdom) Sam Bird	Russian Time	1:29.188	4
5	18	(Monaco) Stefano Coletti	Rapax	1:29.213	5
6	8	(Switzerland) Fabio Leimer	Racing Engineering	1:29.293	6
7	3	(United Kingdom) James Calado	ART Grand Prix	1:29.318	7
8	22	(Netherlands) Robin Frijns	Hilmer Motorsport	1:29.321	8
9	21	(Italy) Kevin Ceccon	Trident Racing	1:29.424	9
10	25	(Italy) Kevin Giovesi	Venezuela GP Lazarus	1:29.425	10
11	10	(United Kingdom) Jolyon Palmer	Carlin	1:29.609	11
12	4	(Germany) Daniel Abt	ART Grand Prix	1:29.668	12
13	14	(Spain) Sergio Canamasas	Caterham Racing	1:29.685	13
14	12	(France) Tom Dillmann	Russian Time	1:29.739	14
15	23	(United Kingdom) Jon Lancaster	Hilmer Motorsport	1:29.759	15
16	16	(United States) Jake Rosenzweig	Barwa Addax Team	1:29.792	16
17	15	(United States) Alexander Rossi	Caterham Racing	1:29.804	17
18	7	(Colombia) Julián Leal	Racing Engineering	1:29.824	18
19	6	(New Zealand) Mitch Evans	Arden International	1:29.936	19
20	24	(Austria) René Binder	Venezuela GP Lazarus	1:29.956	20
21	20	(France) Nathanaël Berthon	Trident Racing	1:29.969	21
22	17	(Indonesia) Rio Haryanto	Barwa Addax Team	1:30.020	22
23	5	(Venezuela) Johnny Cecotto Jr.	Arden International	1:30.025	23
24	19	(Switzerland) Simon Trummer	Rapax	1:30.025	24
25	26	(United Kingdom) Adrian Quaife-Hobbs	MP Motorsport	1:30.763	25
26	27	(Netherlands) Daniël de Jong	MP Motorsport	1:30.773	26

=== Feature race ===
Pos.	No.	Driver	Team	Laps	Time/Retired	Grid	Points
1	22	(Netherlands) Robin Frijns	Hilmer Motorsport	37	1:00:38.896	8	25
2	9	(Brazil) Felipe Nasr	Carlin	37	+3.316	3	18
3	23	(United Kingdom) Jon Lancaster	Hilmer Motorsport	37	+12.609	15	17 (15+2)
4	18	(Monaco) Stefano Coletti	Rapax	37	+13.329	5	12
5	12	(France) Tom Dillmann	Russian Time	37	+14.325	14	10
6	15	(United States) Alexander Rossi	Caterham Racing	37	+17.160	17	8
7	21	(Italy) Kevin Ceccon	Trident Racing	37	+17.504	9	6
8	5	(Venezuela) Johnny Cecotto Jr.	Arden International	37	+24.013	23	4
9	17	(Indonesia) Rio Haryanto	Barwa Addax Team	37	+32.024	22	2
10	10	(United Kingdom) Jolyon Palmer	Carlin	37	+12.290^{1}	11	1
11	4	(Germany) Daniel Abt	ART Grand Prix	37	+32.823	12	
12	6	(New Zealand) Mitch Evans	Arden International	37	+35.748	19	
13	7	(Colombia) Julián Leal	Racing Engineering	37	+39.922	18	
14	16	(United States) Jake Rosenzweig	Barwa Addax Team	37	+40.999	16	
15	2	(Monaco) Stéphane Richelmi	DAMS	37	+42.690	2	
16	27	(Netherlands) Daniël de Jong	MP Motorsport	37	+43.102	26	
17	26	(United Kingdom) Adrian Quaife-Hobbs	MP Motorsport	37	+54.532	25	
18	8	(Switzerland) Fabio Leimer	Racing Engineering	37	+56.946	6	
19	19	(Switzerland) Simon Trummer	Rapax	37	+57.935	24	
20	24	(Austria) René Binder	Venezuela GP Lazarus	36	+1 lap	20	
21	11	(United Kingdom) Sam Bird	Russian Time	33	Retired^{2}	4	
Ret	25	(Italy) Kevin Giovesi	Venezuela GP Lazarus	11	Retired	10	
Ret	1	(Sweden) Marcus Ericsson	DAMS	10	Retired	1	
Ret	14	(Spain) Sergio Canamasas	Caterham Racing	5	Retired	13	
Ret	20	(France) Nathanaël Berthon	Trident Racing	4	Retired	21	
Ret	3	(United Kingdom) James Calado	ART Grand Prix	1	Retired	7	
Fastest lap: Jon Lancaster (Hilmer Motorsport) — 1:34.352 (on lap 9)

Notes:

- ^1 — Jolyon Palmer finished the race in third place, but had twenty seconds added to his race time in lieu of a drive-through penalty after he was judged to have forced Sam Bird off the circuit late in the race.
- ^2 — Sam Bird retired from the race, but was classified as a finisher as he had completed over 90% of the winner's race distance.

=== Sprint race ===
Pos.	No.	Driver	Team	Laps	Time/Retired	Grid	Points
1	18	(Monaco) Stefano Coletti	Rapax	26	41:49.895	5	17 (15+2)
2	22	(Netherlands) Robin Frijns	Hilmer Motorsport	26	+0.691	8	12
3	9	(Brazil) Felipe Nasr	Carlin	26	+7.212	7	10
4	10	(United Kingdom) Jolyon Palmer	Carlin	26	+12.129	10	8
5	5	(Venezuela) Johnny Cecotto Jr.	Arden International	26	+35.593	1	6
6	15	(United States) Alexander Rossi	Caterham Racing	26	+36.991	3	4
7	21	(Italy) Kevin Ceccon	Trident Racing	26	+38.483	2	2
8	4	(Germany) Daniel Abt	ART Grand Prix	26	+39.645	11	1
9	8	(Switzerland) Fabio Leimer	Racing Engineering	26	+40.664	18	
10	23	(United Kingdom) Jon Lancaster	Hilmer Motorsport	26	+41.353	6	
11	3	(United Kingdom) James Calado	ART Grand Prix	26	+41.464	24	
12	11	(United Kingdom) Sam Bird	Russian Time	26	+41.876	26^{3}	
13	6	(New Zealand) Mitch Evans	Arden International	26	+42.520	12	
14	14	(Spain) Sergio Canamasas	Caterham Racing	26	+44.190	23	
15	2	(Monaco) Stéphane Richelmi	DAMS	26	+44.277	15	
16	19	(Switzerland) Simon Trummer	Rapax	26	+44.487	19	
17	25	(Italy) Kevin Giovesi	Venezuela GP Lazarus	26	+44.628	21	
18	27	(Netherlands) Daniël de Jong	MP Motorsport	26	+45.041	16	
19	24	(Austria) René Binder	Venezuela GP Lazarus	26	+48.132	20	
20	1	(Sweden) Marcus Ericsson	DAMS	26	+53.650	22	
21	26	(United Kingdom) Adrian Quaife-Hobbs	MP Motorsport	26	+53.938	17	
22	16	(United States) Jake Rosenzweig	Barwa Addax Team	26	+1:02.518	14	
23	20	(France) Nathanaël Berthon	Trident Racing	26	+1:06.632	25^{4}	
24	17	(Indonesia) Rio Haryanto	Barwa Addax Team	26	+1:25.590	9	
25	7	(Colombia) Julián Leal	Racing Engineering	25	Retired^{5}	13	
26	12	(France) Tom Dillmann	Russian Time	25	+1 lap	4	
Fastest lap: Stefano Coletti (Rapax) — 1:33.727 (on lap 3)

Notes:

- ^3 — Sam Bird was given a five-place grid penalty for causing an avoidable collision with Marcus Ericsson during the feature race.
- ^4 — Nathanaël Berthon was given a ten-place grid penalty for causing an avoidable collision with Sergio Canamasas and Tom Dillmann during the feature race.
- ^5 — Julián Leal retired from the race, but was classified as a finisher as he had completed over 90% of the winner's race distance.

== Standings after the round ==
Drivers' Championship standings

	Pos.	Driver	Points
	1	(Monaco) Stefano Coletti	93
1	2	(Brazil) Felipe Nasr	76
1	3	(Switzerland) Fabio Leimer	54
23	4	(Netherlands) Robin Frijns	37
1	5	(United Kingdom) Sam Bird	33

Teams' Championship standings

	Pos.	Team	Points
1	1	(United Kingdom) Carlin	107
1	2	(Italy) Rapax	101
	3	(Spain) Racing Engineering	64
6	4	(Germany) Hilmer Motorsport	56
1	5	(Russia) Russian Time	55

- Note: Only the top five positions are included for both sets of standings.

== See also ==
- 2013 Spanish Grand Prix
- 2013 Catalunya GP3 Series round

Previous round: 2013 Bahrain GP2 Series round	GP2 Series; 2013 season	Next round: 2013 Monaco GP2 Series round
Previous round: 2012 Catalunya GP2 Series round	Catalunya GP2 round	Next round: 2014 Catalunya GP2 Series round
