= Emil Bernstorff =

British racing driver

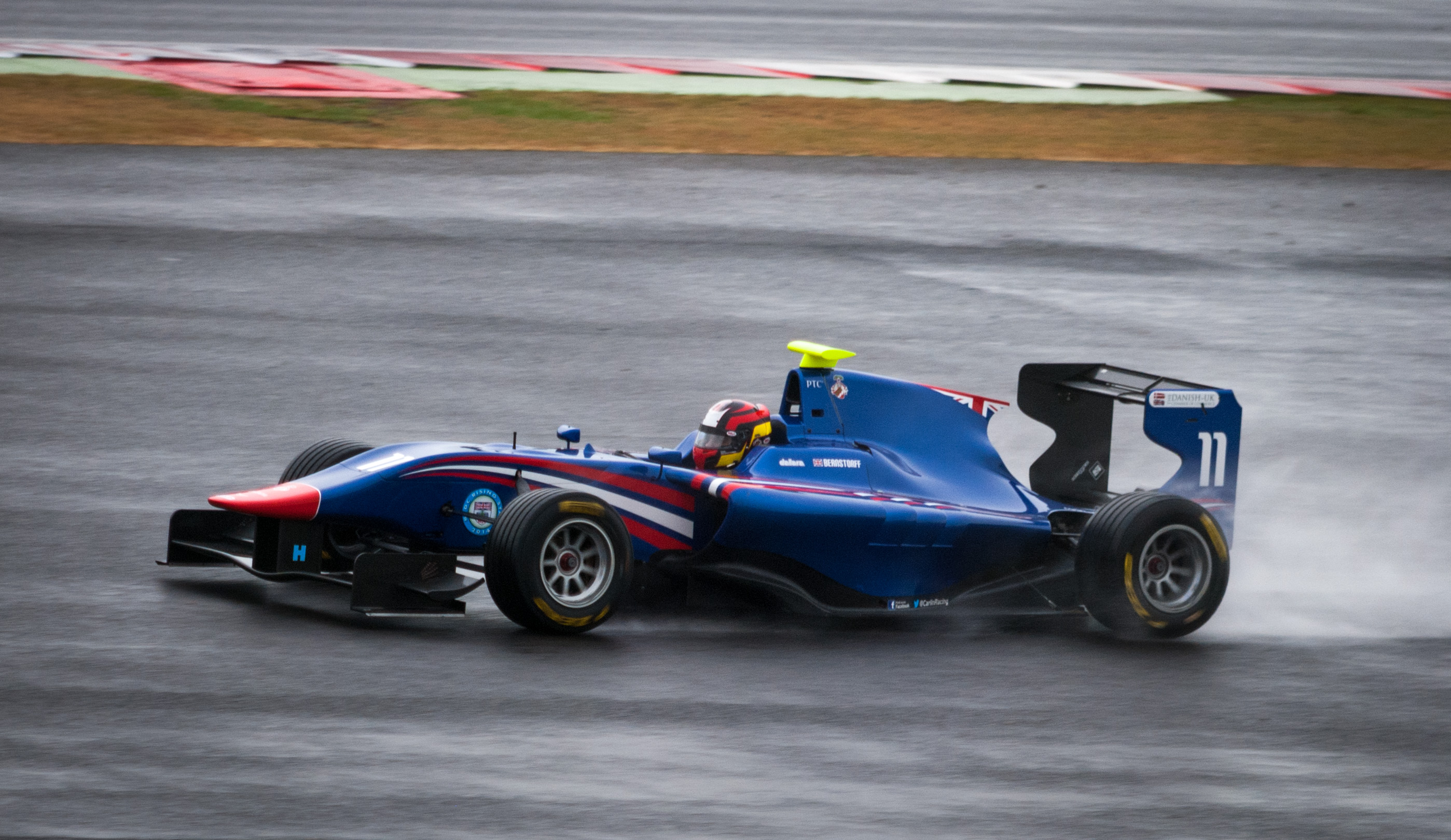
- Nationality: (United Kingdom) British (Denmark) Danish via dual nationality
- Born: Emil Gustav Johan Bernstorff; 7 June 1993 (age 33)

GP3 Series career
- Debut season: 2014
- Current team: Arden International
- Categorisation: FIA Gold (until 2026); FIA Silver (2027–)
- Car number: 15
- Former teams: Carlin
- Starts: 36
- Wins: 3
- Poles: 0
- Fastest laps: 2
- Best finish: 4th in 2015

Previous series
- 2013 2012 2012 2011 2010: German Formula Three; FIA European F3 Championship; Formula 3 Euro Series; ADAC Formel Masters; Formula Ford UK

Emil Gustav Johan Bernstorff (born 7 June 1993) is a British former racing driver and content creator of Danish and German descent. He last raced in the 2016 GP2 Series.

== Career ==
=== Karting ===
Born in Greater London, Bernstorff began karting in 2003 and raced mostly in the United Kingdom for the majority of his karting career, working his way up from the junior ranks to progress through to the KF2 category by 2009, when he finished in eighth position in the Spanish KF2 championship.

=== British Formula Ford ===
2010 saw Bernstorff début in the British Formula Ford Championship with Jamun Racing. He finished seventh in the championship with three podiums.

=== ADAC Formel Masters ===
In 2011, Bernstorff took part in the full ADAC Formel Masters season with Motopark Academy, taking thirteen podiums in twenty-four races, including five victories, to finish runner-up in the final championship standings.

=== FIA European Formula 3 Championship ===
Bernstorff stepped up to the FIA European Formula Three Championship in 2012, switching to ma-con Motorsport. He finished tenth, with a podium finish at the Norisring.

=== German Formula Three Championship ===
Bernstorff moved to the German Formula Three Championship in 2013, reviving his collaboration with Motopark Academy, now running under the Lotus moniker.

=== GP3 Series ===
Bernstorff competed in the 2014 GP3 Series for Carlin. He finished fifth in the standings with one win.

=== GP2 Series ===
In 2016, Bernstroff ran for Arden International at Yas Marina, where he finished 17th in the spring race, and 15th in the feature race.

=== Twitch Streaming ===
Bernstorff began streaming iRacing on Twitch.tv in July 2020 amid the COVID-19 pandemic and started streaming on YouTube in 2022 mainly on iRacing. In 2022, he also started streaming on YouTube.

== Racing record ==
=== Career summary ===
Season	Series	Team	Races	Wins	Poles	F/Laps	Podiums	Points	Position
2010	British Formula Ford Championship	Jamun Racing	24	0	1	5	3	370	7th
2010	Formula Ford Duratec Benelux		2	0	1	0	0	14	19th
2011	ADAC Formel Masters	Motopark Academy	24	5	0	8	13	310	**2nd**
2012	Formula 3 Euro Series	ma-con Motorsport	24	0	0	0	1	91	10th
2012	FIA European Formula 3 Championship	ma-con Motorsport	20	0	0	0	1	66	10th
2013	German Formula 3 Championship	Lotus	26	5	5	4	13	334	**3rd**
2013	Masters of Formula 3	Prema Powerteam	1	0	0	0	1	N/A	**3rd**
2013	European F3 Open Championship	Team West-Tec	2	0	0	0	0	6	20th
2014	GP3 Series	Carlin	18	1	0	1	5	134	5th
2015	GP3 Series	Arden International	18	2	0	1	7	194	4th
2016	GP2 Series	Arden International	2	0	0	0	0	0	25th

=== Complete GP3 Series results ===
(key) (Races in bold indicate pole position) (Races in italics indicate fastest lap)

Year	Entrant	1	2	3	4	5	6	7	8	9	10	11	12	13	14	15	16	17	18	Pos	Points
2014	Carlin	CAT; FEA; Ret	CAT; SPR; 8	RBR; FEA; 2	RBR; SPR; 1	SIL; FEA; 4	SIL; SPR; 3	HOC; FEA; 3	HOC; SPR; Ret	HUN; FEA; 5	HUN; SPR; 7	SPA; FEA; 9	SPA; SPR; 6	MNZ; FEA; 4	MNZ; SPR; 4	SOC; FEA; Ret	SOC; SPR; 8	YMC; FEA; 4	YMC; SPR; 3	5th	134
2015	Arden International	CAT; FEA; 3	CAT; SPR; 5	RBR; FEA; 4	RBR; SPR; 4	SIL; FEA; 2	SIL; SPR; 6	HUN; FEA; 4	HUN; SPR; Ret	SPA; FEA; 1	SPA; SPR; Ret	MNZ; FEA; 1	MNZ; SPR; Ret	SOC; FEA; 3	SOC; SPR; 6	BHR; FEA; 2	BHR; SPR; 4	YMC; FEA; 2	YMC; SPR; 6	4th	194

=== Complete GP2 Series results ===
(key) (Races in bold indicate pole position) (Races in italics indicate fastest lap)

Year	Entrant	1	2	3	4	5	6	7	8	9	10	11	12	13	14	15	16	17	18	19	20	21	22	DC	Points
2016	Arden International	CAT; FEA	CAT; SPR	MON; FEA	MON; SPR	BAK; FEA	BAK; SPR	RBR; FEA	RBR; SPR	SIL; FEA	SIL; SPR	HUN; FEA	HUN; SPR	HOC; FEA	HOC; SPR	SPA; FEA	SPA; SPR	MNZ; FEA	MNZ; SPR	SEP; FEA	SEP; SPR	YMC; FEA; 17	YMC; SPR; 15	25th	0
