= Victor Carbone =

Brazilian racing driver (born 1992)

- Nationality: (Brazil) Brazilian
- Born: September 13, 1992 (age 34) São Paulo (Brazil)

GP3 Series career
- Debut season: 2014
- Current team: Trident Racing
- Car number: 23
- Starts: 8
- Wins: 0
- Poles: 0
- Fastest laps: 0
- Best finish: 31st in 2014

Previous series
- 2011-13 2009–10 2008: Indy Lights; F2000 Championship Series; Skip Barber National Championship

Championship titles
- 2010: F2000 Championship Series

Victor Carbone (born September 13, 1992) is a Brazilian racing driver from São Paulo.

== Career ==
After karting, Carbone participated in the Skip Barber National Championship in 2008 and finished 15th. In 2009, he drove in the F2000 Championship Series for Alegra Motorsports and finished 10th in points. Carbone returned to the team and series in 2010 and won the title, winning six of the 14 races.

In 2011, Carbone signed on with defending Firestone Indy Lights series champions Sam Schmidt Motorsports to race in Indy Lights. He won the final race of the season at Las Vegas Motor Speedway and had another podium finish at Baltimore and finished sixth in points. He returned to Sam Schmidt Motorsports and the Indy Lights series in 2012 and again finished sixth in points, this time without a race win, but with a pair of podium finishes, a pole, and a strong showing in the Freedom 100 where he led the most laps.

In 2014, Carbone competed in the GP3 Series with Trident. He did not score any points before leaving the team after the fourth round at Hockenheimring.

== Racing record ==
=== American open–wheel racing results ===
(key)

==== Indy Lights ====
Year	Team	1	2	3	4	5	6	7	8	9	10	11	12	13	14	Rank	Points	Ref
2011	Sam Schmidt Motorsports	STP; 9	ALA; 14	LBH; 6	INDY; 18	MIL; 6	IOW; 7	TOR; 9	EDM; 11	EDM; 4	TRO; 10	NHM; 10	BAL; 3	KTY; 7	**LVS**; 1	**6th**	**357**	
2012	Sam Schmidt Motorsports	STP; 5	ALA; 5	LBH; 4	INDY; 6	DET; 4	MIL; 6	IOW; 3	**TOR**; 3	EDM; 8	TRO; 8	BAL; DNS	FON; 5			**6th**	**340**	
2013	Team Moore Racing	STP	ALA; 7	LBH	INDY	MIL	IOW	POC	TOR	MOH	BAL	HOU	FON			**14th**	**26**	

=== Complete GP3 Series results ===
(key) (Races in bold indicate pole position) (Races in italics indicate fastest lap)

Year	Entrant	1	2	3	4	5	6	7	8	9	10	11	12	13	14	15	16	17	18	Pos	Points
2014	Trident	CAT; FEA; Ret	CAT; SPR; 17	RBR; FEA; 18	RBR; SPR; 18	SIL; FEA; 23	SIL; SPR; Ret	HOC; FEA; 23	HOC; SPR; 20	HUN; FEA	HUN; SPR	SPA; FEA	SPA; SPR	MNZ; FEA	MNZ; SPR	SOC; FEA	SOC; SPR	YMC; FEA	YMC; SPR	31st	0
