= Roman de Beer =

South African racing driver

- Nationality: (South Africa) South African
- Born: 6 October 1994 (age 32) Johannesburg, South Africa

GP3 Series career
- Debut season: 2014
- Current team: Trident
- Categorisation: FIA Silver
- Car number: 24
- Starts: 10
- Wins: 0
- Poles: 0
- Fastest laps: 0
- Best finish: 18th in 2014

Previous series
- 2012 2010–11: Italian Formula Three; Formula Abarth

Roman Shane de Beer (born 6 October 1994) is a South African former racing driver.

== Career ==
=== Karting ===
Born in Johannesburg, de Beer began karting in 1999 and raced primarily in his native South Africa for the majority of his karting career, working his way up from the junior ranks to progress through to the Rotax Max category by 2010, and ultimately, winning the ROK Cup International Final.

=== Formula Abarth ===
In 2010, de Beer graduated to single–seaters, moving into the newly launched Formula Abarth series in Italy, with Scuderia Victoria World. He scored podiums at Imola, Varano and Vallelunga and finished the season ninth. De Beer stayed in Formula Abarth for a second season in 2011 with the same team, when the series was split into two distinct sub-championships – European and Italian championships. But after three rounds he ended his racing season with a podium at Misano. He finished the season eleventh in the Italian championship standings.

=== Italian Formula Three ===
In 2012, dṅe Beer continued his collaboration with Scuderia Victoria into the Italian Formula Three Championship. He finished the season twelfth in the Italian championship standings.

=== GP3 Series ===
After missing the 2013 racing season, de Beer then drove for the Trident team in the GP3 Series in 2014. He finished fourth in race 2 at the Red Bull Ring, but left the series midway through the season.

== Racing record ==
=== Career summary ===
Season	Series	Team	Races	Wins	Poles	F/Laps	Podiums	Points	Position
2010	Formula Abarth	Scuderia Victoria	14	0	0	0	3	53	9th
2011	Formula Abarth Italian Series	Victoria World	6	0	0	1	1	36	11th
2011	Formula Abarth European Series	Victoria World	2	0	0	1	1	12	16th
2012	Italian Formula Three European Series	Scuderia Victoria	9	0	0	0	0	0	NC†
2012	Italian Formula Three Italian Series	Scuderia Victoria	9	0	0	0	0	28	12th
2014	GP3 Series	Trident	10	0	0	0	0	8	18th

† – As de Beer was a guest driver, he was ineligible for points.

=== Complete GP3 Series results ===
(key) (Races in bold indicate pole position) (Races in italics indicate fastest lap)

Year	Entrant	1	2	3	4	5	6	7	8	9	10	11	12	13	14	15	16	17	18	Pos	Points
2014	Trident	CAT; FEA; Ret	CAT; SPR; DSQ	RBR; FEA; 12	RBR; SPR; 4	SIL; FEA; 17	SIL; SPR; 16	HOC; FEA; 21	HOC; SPR; 17	HUN; FEA; 15	HUN; SPR; 12	SPA; FEA	SPA; SPR	MNZ; FEA	MNZ; SPR	SOC; FEA	SOC; SPR	YMC; FEA	YMC; SPR	18th	8
