= 2012 European F3 Open Championship =

Motor racing competition

Seasons
- ← 2011 2013 →

The 2012 European F3 Open Championship was the fourth European F3 Open Championship season. The series introduced the new Dallara F312 cars for Class A, with the F308 model being implemented for the Copa Class.

== Teams and drivers ==
- All cars are powered by Toyota engines. Main class powered by Dallara F312, while Copa Class by Dallara F308 chassis.

Team	No.	Driver	Rounds
Class A
(United Kingdom) Team West-Tec F3	1	(Belgium) Sam Dejonghe	1–7
(United Kingdom) Team West-Tec F3	1	(United Arab Emirates) Ed Jones	8
(United Kingdom) Team West-Tec F3	2	(Spain) Manuel Bejarano	1–2
(United Kingdom) Team West-Tec F3	15	(Venezuela) Roberto La Rocca	3–8
(Italy) RP Motorsport	3	(Canada) Gianmarco Raimondo	NC, All
(Italy) RP Motorsport	5	(Italy) Niccolò Schirò	All
(Italy) RP Motorsport	18	(Italy) Michela Cerruti	2–3
(Spain) EmiliodeVillota Motorsport	4	(Mexico) Juan Carlos Sistos	1–7
(Spain) EmiliodeVillota Motorsport	4	(Spain) Alex Riberas	8
(Spain) EmiliodeVillota Motorsport	6	(Sweden) Måns Grenhagen	All
(Spain) EmiliodeVillota Motorsport	7	(Colombia) Tatiana Calderón	All
(France) Top F3	10	(France) Pierre Sancinéna	1–3
(France) Top F3	10	(United Kingdom) Rupert Svendsen-Cook	4
(France) Top F3	10	(United States) Corey Smith	6
(Spain) Campos Racing	11	(Russia) Denis Nagulin	All
(Spain) Campos Racing	12	(Argentina) Facu Regalia	All
(Spain) Cedars-Escuela Profilltex-Circuit	33	(Lebanon) Noel Jammal	1–5
(Spain) Cedars-Escuela Profilltex-Circuit	34	(Italy) Matteo Beretta	1–3
(Spain) Cedars-Escuela Profilltex-Circuit	34	(Lebanon) Noel Jammal	6–8
Copa F308/306
(United Kingdom) Team West-Tec F3	1	(United Kingdom) Alex Lynn	NC
(United Kingdom) Team West-Tec F3	31	(Italy) Luca Orlandi	NC, 1–4, 7–8
(United Kingdom) Team West-Tec F3	31	(New Zealand) Chris Vlok	6
(United Kingdom) Team West-Tec F3	88	(Australia) Jordan Oon	All
(Italy) RP Motorsport	5	(Italy) Niccolò Schirò	NC
(Italy) RP Motorsport	18	(Italy) Matteo Davenia	NC
(Italy) RP Motorsport	18	(Italy) Michela Cerruti	1
(Italy) RP Motorsport	18	(Spain) Alexander Boquoi	6–8
(Italy) RP Motorsport	19	(Italy) Michela Cerruti	NC
(Italy) RP Motorsport	20	(Venezuela) Trino Raúl Rojas	NC, All
(Italy) RP Motorsport	35	(Finland) Kristian Laine	8
(Spain) Drivex School	13	(Spain) José Luis Abadín	8
(Spain) Drivex School	30	(Spain) Cristian Serrada	NC, 1–3, 5–6
(France) Top F3	17	(France) Jordan Perroy	1–6, 8
(France) Top F3	29	(France) Alexandre Cougnaud	NC, All
(France) Top F3	36	(France) Pierre Sancinéna	NC
(Italy) Corbetta Competizioni	21	(Spain) Fran Suárez	1–2
(Italy) Corbetta Competizioni	21	(Spain) Gerard Barrabeig	3–8
(Italy) Corbetta Competizioni	22	(Italy) Matteo Torta	NC, All
(Italy) Corbetta Competizioni	26	(Spain) Gerard Barrabeig	NC
(Spain) EmiliodeVillota Motorsport	23	(Mexico) Juan Carlos Sistos	NC
(Spain) EmiliodeVillota Motorsport	24	(Colombia) Tatiana Calderón	NC
(Spain) EmiliodeVillota Motorsport	25	(Venezuela) Valeria Carballo	NC, All
(Spain) EmiliodeVillota Motorsport	26	(Israel) Yarin Stern	8
(Spain) EmiliodeVillota Motorsport	32	(Sweden) Måns Grenhagen	NC
(Italy) DAV Racing	24	(Italy) Kevin Giovesi	1–7
(Italy) DAV Racing	77	(Italy) Matteo Davenia	All
(Spain) Cedars-Escuela Profilltex-Circuit	27	(Spain) Alexander Toril Boquoi	NC, 1–5
(Spain) Cedars-Escuela Profilltex-Circuit	27	(Spain) Moisés Soriano	7–8
(Spain) Cedars-Escuela Profilltex-Circuit	28	(United States) Shane Morris	NC
(Spain) Cedars-Escuela Profilltex-Circuit	28	(Spain) Moisés Soriano	1–6
(Spain) Cedars-Escuela Profilltex-Circuit	33	(Lebanon) Noel Jammal	NC
(Spain) Cedars-Escuela Profilltex-Circuit	34	(Italy) Matteo Beretta	NC

== Race calendar and results ==
- An eight-round provisional calendar was revealed on 5 November 2011 and later it was confirmed. Two Spanish races at Valencia and Jerez were dropped from the series' schedule in favour of races at the Nürburgring and the Hungaroring, leaving only Algarve and Montmeló as races in Iberia. Meanwhile, the French round at Magny-Cours was transferred to Le Castellet. All rounds will support the International GT Open series.

Round		Circuit	Date	Pole position	Fastest lap	Winning driver	Winning team	Copa Winner
NC	R1	(France) Circuit Paul Ricard, Le Castellet	4 March	(Lebanon) Noel Jammal (Note: The grid for race one was based on a qualifying session held at Portimão on 17 February. Only the cars which took part in that session were allowed to start the race.)	(Lebanon) Noel Jammal	(Lebanon) Noel Jammal	(Spain) Cedars-Escuela Profilltex-Circuit	(Italy) Kevin Giovesi
NC	R2	(France) Circuit Paul Ricard, Le Castellet	4 March	(Italy) Matteo Davenia	(Lebanon) Noel Jammal	(Sweden) Måns Grenhagen	(Spain) EmiliodeVillota Motorsport	(Sweden) Måns Grenhagen
1	R1	(Portugal) Autódromo Internacional do Algarve, Portimão	28 April	(Mexico) Juan Carlos Sistos	(Belgium) Sam Dejonghe	(Mexico) Juan Carlos Sistos	(Spain) EmiliodeVillota Motorsport	(Italy) Kevin Giovesi
1	R2	(Portugal) Autódromo Internacional do Algarve, Portimão	29 April	(Sweden) Måns Grenhagen	(Sweden) Måns Grenhagen	(Sweden) Måns Grenhagen	(Spain) EmiliodeVillota Motorsport	(Italy) Kevin Giovesi
2	R1	(Germany) Nürburgring	26 May	(Canada) Gianmarco Raimondo	(Italy) Niccolò Schirò	(Belgium) Sam Dejonghe	(United Kingdom) Team West-Tec F3	(France) Jordan Perroy
2	R2	(Germany) Nürburgring	27 May	(Canada) Gianmarco Raimondo	(Italy) Niccolò Schirò	(Canada) Gianmarco Raimondo	(Italy) RP Motorsport	(Italy) Kevin Giovesi
3	R1	(Belgium) Circuit de Spa-Francorchamps	23 June	(Sweden) Måns Grenhagen	(Italy) Niccolò Schirò	(Canada) Gianmarco Raimondo	(Italy) RP Motorsport	(Spain) Moisés Soriano
3	R2	(Belgium) Circuit de Spa-Francorchamps	24 June	(Canada) Gianmarco Raimondo	(Canada) Gianmarco Raimondo	(Sweden) Måns Grenhagen	(Spain) EmiliodeVillota Motorsport	(Italy) Kevin Giovesi
4	R1	(United Kingdom) Brands Hatch, Kent	14 July	(Sweden) Måns Grenhagen	(United Kingdom) Rupert Svendsen-Cook	(Sweden) Måns Grenhagen	(Spain) EmiliodeVillota Motorsport	(Italy) Kevin Giovesi
4	R2	(United Kingdom) Brands Hatch, Kent	15 July	(Argentina) Facu Regalia	(Italy) Niccolò Schirò	(Canada) Gianmarco Raimondo	(Italy) RP Motorsport	(Italy) Kevin Giovesi
5	R1	(France) Circuit Paul Ricard, Le Castellet	21 July	(Italy) Niccolò Schirò	(Italy) Niccolò Schirò	(Italy) Niccolò Schirò	(Italy) RP Motorsport	(Italy) Kevin Giovesi
5	R2	(France) Circuit Paul Ricard, Le Castellet	22 July	(Italy) Niccolò Schirò	(Italy) Niccolò Schirò	(Italy) Niccolò Schirò	(Italy) RP Motorsport	(Spain) Moisés Soriano
6	R1	(Hungary) Hungaroring, Mogyoród	8 September	(Canada) Gianmarco Raimondo	(Canada) Gianmarco Raimondo	(Canada) Gianmarco Raimondo	(Italy) RP Motorsport	(Italy) Kevin Giovesi
6	R2	(Hungary) Hungaroring, Mogyoród	9 September	(Argentina) Facu Regalia	(Argentina) Facu Regalia	(Argentina) Facu Regalia	(Spain) Campos Racing	(Italy) Kevin Giovesi
7	R1	(Italy) Autodromo Nazionale Monza	29 September	(Sweden) Måns Grenhagen	(Italy) Niccolò Schirò	(Italy) Niccolò Schirò	(Italy) RP Motorsport	(Italy) Kevin Giovesi
7	R2	(Italy) Autodromo Nazionale Monza	30 September	(Canada) Gianmarco Raimondo	(Canada) Gianmarco Raimondo	(Italy) Niccolò Schirò	(Italy) RP Motorsport	(Italy) Kevin Giovesi
8	R1	(Spain) Circuit de Catalunya, Montmeló	3 November	(Italy) Niccolò Schirò	(Lebanon) Noel Jammal (Note: Fastest lap recorded by Alex Riberas, but he was ineligible to score the fastest lap point.)	(Argentina) Facu Regalia	(Spain) Campos Racing	(Spain) Gerard Barrabeig
8	R2	(Spain) Circuit de Catalunya, Montmeló	4 November	(Argentina) Facu Regalia	(Argentina) Facu Regalia	(Argentina) Facu Regalia	(Spain) Campos Racing	(Spain) Moisés Soriano

== Championship standings ==
=== Overall ===
- Points were awarded as follows:

1	2	3	4	5	6	7	8	9	10	PP	FL
25	18	15	12	10	8	6	4	2	1	**1**	1

Pos	Driver	LEC1 (France)		ALG (Portugal)		NÜR (Germany)		SPA (Belgium)		BRH (United Kingdom)		LEC2 (France)		HUN (Hungary)		MNZ (Italy)		CAT (Spain)		Pts
1	(Italy) Niccolò Schirò		WD	21	3	4	2	3	3	2	3	**1**	**1**	2	4	1	1	**2**	4	272
2	(Canada) Gianmarco Raimondo		2	4	2	**2**	**1**	1	**2**	5	1	2	2	**1**	3	3	**4**	4	14	267
3	(Sweden) Måns Grenhagen	Ret	1	2	**1**	3	5	**2**	1	**1**	Ret	16	3	Ret	5	**2**	11	5	5	211
4	(Argentina) Facu Regalia			6	4	5	3	8	14	11	**2**	3	5	Ret	**1**	4	9	1	**1**	186
5	(Belgium) Sam Dejonghe			3	Ret	1	4	4	4	4	7	6	4	18	2	6	2			159
6	(Italy) Kevin Giovesi			5	5	Ret	8	19	5	6	6	8	Ret	5	8	5	3			93
7	(Mexico) Juan Carlos Sistos	DNS	7	**1**	9	7	6	9	7	10	4	4	8	7	9	Ret	18			87
8	(Lebanon) Noel Jammal	**1**	5	8	8	22	9	7	10	7	17	7	6	3	13	8	Ret	10	DNS	61
9	(Colombia) Tatiana Calderón	3	Ret	Ret	10	Ret	11	14	9	12	10	5	7	4	7	12	16	8	7	56
10	(Venezuela) Roberto La Rocca							12	6	9	Ret	Ret	11	6	6	16	6	6	Ret	44
11	(Italy) Matteo Beretta	Ret	4	7	6	8	7	6	8											36
12	(Spain) Moisés Soriano			20	13	14	13	5	12	8	9	15	9	20	DNS	Ret	10	11	6	33
13	(United Kingdom) Rupert Svendsen-Cook									3	5									26
14	(Spain) Gerard Barrabeig		Ret					Ret	16	13	Ret	9	12	9	12	11	7	9	9	22
15	(France) Alexandre Cougnaud	5	8	10	12	11	10	15	11	16	11	10	10	19	14	13	5	20	15	14
16	(Spain) Manuel Bejarano			11	7	6	14													14
17	(Italy) Matteo Davenia		**10**	9	16	Ret	17	11	20	Ret	8	12	13	13	10	15	8	Ret	Ret	11
18	(Spain) Alexander Toril Boquoi	4	6	23	DNS	13	16	Ret	17	19	12	11	20	17	17	10	15	13	8	9
19	(Australia) Jordan Oon			16	14	10	12	10	13	14	14	Ret	19	8	11	Ret	12	16	13	7
20	(Venezuela) Valeria Carballo	8	14	17	15	Ret	22	17	Ret	18	15	13	15	14	15	7	Ret	18	Ret	6
21	(Russia) Denis Nagulin			24	Ret	12	21	Ret	Ret	17	16	20	21	15	20	9	17	Ret	10	6
22	(France) Jordan Perroy			12	21	9	19	Ret	Ret	15	13	14	14	Ret	18					2
23	(Italy) Luca Orlandi	7	13	13	20	21	23	18	19	DNS	DNS					14	DNS	14	11	2
24	(Venezuela) Trino Raúl Rojas		11	18	22	18	26	16	Ret	21	Ret	18	16	10	19	Ret	13	12	Ret	2
25	(Spain) Cristian Serrada	6	Ret	19	11	17	18	Ret	Ret			19	18	12	16					0
26	(New Zealand) Chris Vlok													11	21					0
27	(France) Pierre Sancinéna	Ret	9	15	NC	16	20	13	15											0
28	(Italy) Matteo Torta		12	14	18	19	24	Ret	21	20	Ret	17	17	16	22	Ret	14	15	DSQ	0
29	(Spain) Fran Suárez			22	17	15	15													0
30	(Italy) Michela Cerruti		DNS	Ret	19	20	25	20	18											0
31	(United States) Corey Smith													21	23					0
Guest drivers ineligible for points
	(United Arab Emirates) Ed Jones																	7	2	0
	(Spain) Alex Riberas																	3	3	0
	(Finland) Kristian Laine																	17	12	0
	(Israel) Yarin Stern																	19	Ret	0
	(Spain) José Luis Abadín																	Ret	Ret	0
Non-championship round-only drivers
	(United Kingdom) Alex Lynn	2	3																	0
	(United States) Shane Morris		WD																	0
Pos	Driver	LEC1 (France)		ALG (Portugal)		NÜR (Germany)		SPA (Belgium)		BRH (United Kingdom)		LEC2 (France)		HUN (Hungary)		MNZ (Italy)		CAT (Spain)		Pts

Colour	Result
Gold	Winner
Silver	Second place
Bronze	Third place
Green	Points classification
Blue	Non-points classification
Blue	Non-classified finish (NC)
Purple	Retired, not classified (Ret)
Red	Did not qualify (DNQ)
Red	Did not pre-qualify (DNPQ)
Black	Disqualified (DSQ)
White	Did not start (DNS)
White	Withdrew (WD)
White	Race cancelled (C)
Blank	Did not practice (DNP)
Blank	Did not arrive (DNA)
Blank	Excluded (EX)

**Bold** – Pole
Italics – Fastest Lap

=== Copa F308/300 ===
- Points were awarded as follows:

1	2	3	4	5
10	8	6	4	3

Pos	Driver	LEC1 (France)		ALG (Portugal)		NÜR (Germany)		SPA (Belgium)		BRH (United Kingdom)		LEC2 (France)		HUN (Hungary)		MNZ (Italy)		CAT (Spain)		Pts
1	(Italy) Kevin Giovesi			5	5	Ret	8	19	5	6	6	8	Ret	5	8	5	3			110
2	(Spain) Moisés Soriano			20	13	14	13	5	12	8	9	15	9	20	DNS	Ret	10	11	6	72
3	(France) Alexandre Cougnaud	5	8	10	12	11	10	15	11	16	11	10	10	19	14	13	5	20	15	70
4	(Spain) Gerard Barrabeig		Ret					Ret	16	13	Ret	9	12	9	12	11	7	9	9	59
5	(Australia) Jordan Oon			16	14	10	12	10	13	14	14	Ret	19	8	11	Ret	12	16	13	50
6	(Italy) Matteo Davenia		10	9	16	Ret	17	11	20	Ret	8	12	13	13	10	15	8	Ret	Ret	41
7	(Spain) Alexander Toril Boquoi	4	6	23	DNS	13	16	Ret	17	19	12	11	20	17	17	10	15	13	8	29
8	(France) Jordan Perroy			12	21	9	19	Ret	Ret	15	13	14	14	Ret	18					20
9	(Venezuela) Trino Raúl Rojas		11	18	22	18	26	16	Ret	21	Ret	18	16	10	19	Ret	13	12	Ret	13
10	(Italy) Luca Orlandi	7	13	13	20	21	23	18	19	DNS	DNS					14	DNS	14	11	10
11	(Venezuela) Valeria Carballo	8	14	17	15	Ret	22	17	Ret	18	15	13	15	14	15	7	Ret	18	Ret	8
12	(Spain) Cristian Serrada	6	Ret	19	11	17	18	Ret	Ret			19	18	12	16					8
13	(New Zealand) Chris Vlok													11	21					3
14	(Spain) Fran Suárez			22	17	15	15													3
15	(Italy) Matteo Torta		12	14	18	19	24	Ret	21	20	Ret	17	17	16	22	Ret	14	15	DSQ	0
16	(Italy) Michela Cerruti		DNS	Ret	19															0
Guest driver ineligible for points
	(Finland) Kristian Laine																	17	12	0
	(Israel) Yarin Stern																	19	Ret	0
	(Spain) José Luis Abadín																	Ret	Ret	0
Non-championship round-only drivers
	(Lebanon) Noel Jammal	1	5																	0
	(Sweden) Måns Grenhagen	Ret	1																	0
	(United Kingdom) Alex Lynn	2	3																	0
	(Colombia) Tatiana Calderon	3	Ret																	0
	(Italy) Matteo Beretta	Ret	4																	0
	(Mexico) Juan Carlos Sistos	DNS	7																	0
	(France) Pierre Sancinéna	Ret	9																	0
	(United States) Shane Morris		WD																	0
	(Italy) Niccolò Schirò		WD																	0
Pos	Driver	LEC1 (France)		ALG (Portugal)		NÜR (Germany)		SPA (Belgium)		BRH (United Kingdom)		LEC2 (France)		HUN (Hungary)		MNZ (Italy)		CAT (Spain)		Pts

Colour	Result
Gold	Winner
Silver	Second place
Bronze	Third place
Green	Points classification
Blue	Non-points classification
Blue	Non-classified finish (NC)
Purple	Retired, not classified (Ret)
Red	Did not qualify (DNQ)
Red	Did not pre-qualify (DNPQ)
Black	Disqualified (DSQ)
White	Did not start (DNS)
White	Withdrew (WD)
White	Race cancelled (C)
Blank	Did not practice (DNP)
Blank	Did not arrive (DNA)
Blank	Excluded (EX)

**Bold** – Pole
Italics – Fastest Lap

=== Teams ===
- The best F312 and the best F308 of each entered team will score points in each of the races.

Pos	1	2	3	4	5
Points	10	8	6	4	3

Pos	Team	Class	LEC1 (France)		ALG (Portugal)		NÜR (Germany)		SPA (Belgium)		BRH (United Kingdom)		LEC2 (France)		HUN (Hungary)		MNZ (Italy)		CAT (Spain)		Pts
1	(Italy) RP Motorsport	A		2	4	2	2	1	1	2	2	1	1	1	1	3	1	1	2	4	138
1	(Italy) RP Motorsport	C		10	18	22	18	26	16	Ret	21	Ret	18	16	10	17	Ret	13	12	Ret	138
2	(Spain) EmiliodeVillota Motorsport	A			1	1	3	5	2	1	1	4	4	3	4	5	2	11	5	5	97
2	(Spain) EmiliodeVillota Motorsport	C	3	1	17	15	Ret	22	17	Ret	18	15	13	15	14	15	7	Ret	18	Ret	97
3	(Spain) Campos Racing	A			6	4	5	3	8	14	11	2	3	5	15	1	4	9	1	1	66
4	(United Kingdom) Team West-Tec F3	A			3	7	1	4	4	4	4	7	6	4	6	2	6	2	6	Ret	57
4	(United Kingdom) Team West-Tec F3	C	2	3	13	14	10	12	10	13	14	14	Ret	19	8	11	14	12	14	11	57
5	(Italy) DAV Racing	C			5	5	Ret	8	11	5	6	6	8	13	5	8	5	3	Ret	Ret	21
6	(Spain) Cedars-Profilltex-Circuit	A			7	6	8	7	6	8	7	17	7	6	3	13	8	Ret	10	DNS	16
6	(Spain) Cedars-Profilltex-Circuit	C	1	4	20	13	13	13	5	12	8	9	11	9	20	DNS	Ret	10	11	6	16
7	(France) Top F3	A			15	NC	16	20	13	15	3	5			21	23					12
7	(France) Top F3	C	5	8	10	12	11	10	15	11	15	11	10	10	19	14	13	5	20	15	12
8	(Italy) Corbetta Competizioni	C		12	14	17	15	15	Ret	16	13	Ret	9	12	9	12	11	7	9	9	0
9	(Spain) Drivex School	C	6	Ret	19	11	17	18	Ret	Ret			19	18	12	16			Ret	Ret	0
Pos	Team	Class	LEC1 (France)		ALG (Portugal)		NÜR (Germany)		SPA (Belgium)		BRH (United Kingdom)		LEC2 (France)		HUN (Hungary)		MNZ (Italy)		CAT (Spain)		Pts

Colour	Result
Gold	Winner
Silver	Second place
Bronze	Third place
Green	Points classification
Blue	Non-points classification
Blue	Non-classified finish (NC)
Purple	Retired, not classified (Ret)
Red	Did not qualify (DNQ)
Red	Did not pre-qualify (DNPQ)
Black	Disqualified (DSQ)
White	Did not start (DNS)
White	Withdrew (WD)
White	Race cancelled (C)
Blank	Did not practice (DNP)
Blank	Did not arrive (DNA)
Blank	Excluded (EX)

**Bold** – Pole
Italics – Fastest Lap
