= 2011 European F3 Open Championship =

Motor racing competition

Seasons
- ← 2010 2012 →

The 2011 European F3 Open Championship was the third European F3 Open Championship season. The season began on 17 April at Circuit Ricardo Tormo in Valencia, and finished on 30 October at Circuit de Catalunya in Montmeló after 16 races run at eight meetings, three held in Spain, as well as meetings held in Belgium, France, the United Kingdom, Portugal, and Italy.

== Teams and drivers ==
The main class used Dallara F308 chassis, while Copa Class used Dallara F306. All cars were powered by Toyota engines.

Team	No.	Driver	Rounds
Class A
(Spain) Cedars	2	(Denmark) Johan Jokinen	1–2
(Spain) Cedars	33	(Lebanon) Noel Jammal	All
(United Kingdom) Team West-Tec	3	(Brazil) Victor Corrêa	All
(United Kingdom) Team West-Tec	4	(Malaysia) Fahmi Ilyas	4–5
(United Kingdom) Team West-Tec	4	(Colombia) Tatiana Calderón	6–8
(Italy) RP Motorsport	5	(Italy) Niccolò Schirò	All
(Italy) RP Motorsport	6	(Italy) David Fumanelli	All
(Italy) RP Motorsport	7	(Italy) Matteo Beretta	All
(Italy) RP Motorsport	77	(Italy) Matteo Davenia	All
(Spain) Drivex	8	(Spain) Fernando Monje	All
(Spain) Hache Team	9	(Spain) Toño Fernández	1–2
(Spain) Hache Team	9	(Brazil) Yann Cunha	3–7
(Italy) Corbetta Competizioni	10	(Switzerland) Alex Fontana	All
(Italy) Corbetta Competizioni	11	(Italy) Matteo Torta	All
(Spain) De Villota Motorsport	12	(Mexico) Juan Carlos Sistos	All
(Spain) De Villota Motorsport	14	(Spain) Nil Montserrat	1
(Spain) De Villota Motorsport	14	(Switzerland) Zoël Amberg	6–8
(France) Top F3 Team	16	(France) William Vermont	2–4
Copa F306/300
(Spain) Cedars	21	(Spain) Manuel Bejarano	7–8
(Italy) RP Motorsport	24	(Colombia) Francisco Diaz	2–3, 5–8
(Spain) Drivex	25	(Spain) Pedro Quesada	1
(Spain) Drivex	25	(Spain) Luis Villalba	2
(Spain) Drivex	25	(Spain) Cristian Serrada	6, 8
(Spain) Hache Team	26	(Spain) Pedro Quesada	2–3
(United Kingdom) Team West-Tec	28	(Italy) Luca Orlandi	1–3, 5–8
(United Kingdom) Team West-Tec	28	(Japan) Kotaro Sakurai	4
(United Kingdom) Team West-Tec	58	(Belgium) Sam Dejonghe	All
(United Kingdom) Team West-Tec	88	(Brazil) Fabio Gamberini	All
(France) Top F3 Team	31	(United States) Jesus Rios	3, 8
(France) Top F3 Team	31	(Saudi Arabia) Saud Al Faisal	4

== Race calendar and results ==
- An eight-race provisional calendar was announced on 12 December 2010. On 19 January 2011, it was announced that the Nürburgring round will be cancelled and will be replaced by an event in Portimão.

Round		Circuit	Date	Pole position	Fastest lap	Winning driver	Winning team
1	R1	(Spain) Circuit Ricardo Tormo, Valencia	17 April	(Switzerland) Alex Fontana	(Denmark) Johan Jokinen	(Denmark) Johan Jokinen	(Spain) Cedars
1	R2	(Spain) Circuit Ricardo Tormo, Valencia	17 April		(Spain) Toño Fernández	(Spain) Toño Fernández	(Spain) Hache Team
2	R1	(France) Circuit de Nevers Magny-Cours	14 May	(Lebanon) Noel Jammal	(Spain) Toño Fernández	(Brazil) Victor Corrêa	(United Kingdom) Team West-Tec
2	R2	(France) Circuit de Nevers Magny-Cours	15 May		(Denmark) Johan Jokinen	(Denmark) Johan Jokinen	(Spain) Cedars
3	R1	(Belgium) Circuit de Spa-Francorchamps	25 June	(Italy) David Fumanelli	(Lebanon) Noel Jammal	(Brazil) Fabio Gamberini	(United Kingdom) Team West-Tec
3	R2	(Belgium) Circuit de Spa-Francorchamps	26 June		(Mexico) Juan Carlos Sistos	(Switzerland) Alex Fontana	(Italy) Corbetta Competizioni
4	R1	(United Kingdom) Brands Hatch	23 July	(Malaysia) Fahmi Ilyas	(Malaysia) Fahmi Ilyas	(Malaysia) Fahmi Ilyas	(United Kingdom) Team West-Tec
4	R2	(United Kingdom) Brands Hatch	24 July		(Brazil) Yann Cunha	(Brazil) Victor Corrêa	(United Kingdom) Team West-Tec
5	R1	(Portugal) Autódromo Internacional do Algarve, Portimão	17 September	(Malaysia) Fahmi Ilyas	(Switzerland) Alex Fontana	(Italy) David Fumanelli	(Italy) RP Motorsport
5	R2	(Portugal) Autódromo Internacional do Algarve, Portimão	18 September		(Italy) David Fumanelli	(Brazil) Yann Cunha	(Spain) Hache Team
6	R1	(Italy) Autodromo Nazionale Monza	1 October	(Italy) David Fumanelli	(Spain) Fernando Monje	(Italy) David Fumanelli	(Italy) RP Motorsport
6	R2	(Italy) Autodromo Nazionale Monza	2 October		(Mexico) Juan Carlos Sistos	(Switzerland) Alex Fontana	(Italy) Corbetta Competizioni
7	R1	(Spain) Circuito de Jerez	16 October	(Italy) David Fumanelli	(Italy) David Fumanelli	(Italy) David Fumanelli	(Italy) RP Motorsport
7	R2	(Spain) Circuito de Jerez	16 October		(Italy) Niccolò Schirò	(Lebanon) Noel Jammal	(Spain) Cedars
8	R1	(Spain) Circuit de Catalunya	29 October	(Italy) David Fumanelli	(Italy) David Fumanelli	(Switzerland) Zoël Amberg	(Spain) De Villota Motorsport
8	R2	(Spain) Circuit de Catalunya	30 October		(Italy) David Fumanelli	(Italy) David Fumanelli	(Italy) RP Motorsport

== Championship standings ==
=== Overall ===
- With a driver's best 14 scores counting towards the championship, points were awarded as follows:

	1	2	3	4	5	6	7	8	9	PP	FL
Race 1	14	12	10	8	6	5	3	2	1	**1**	1
Race 2	12	10	8	6	5	4	3	2	1	0	1

Pos	Driver	VAL (Spain)		MAG (France)		SPA (Belgium)		BRH (United Kingdom)		ALG (Portugal)		MON (Italy)		JER (Spain)		CAT (Spain)		Pts
1	(Switzerland) Alex Fontana	**2**	3	3	4	4	1	5	4	11	5	3	1	4	3	4	10	120
2	(Italy) David Fumanelli	12	12	13	6	**6**	2	Ret	13	1	2	**1**	4	**1**	4	**2**	1	115
3	(Brazil) Fabio Gamberini	4	6	6	2	1	10	4	5	6	6	Ret	11	5	2	13	Ret	79
4	(Mexico) Juan Carlos Sistos	10	8	7	5	Ret	4	7	7	3	9	4	3	2	5	Ret	3	76
5	(Italy) Niccolò Schirò	13	7	9	8	9	6	2	2	9	7	5	5	7	7	5	4	66
6	(Brazil) Victor Corrêa	7	5	1	7	3	12	6	1	Ret	12	8	Ret	9	9	7	Ret	59
7	(Lebanon) Noel Jammal	Ret	11	**8**	Ret	2	5	Ret	11	5	4	Ret	14	6	1	6	Ret	55
8	(Switzerland) Zoël Amberg											2	Ret	3	6	1	2	50
9	(Brazil) Yann Cunha					Ret	7	3	3	4	1	12	DNS	8	17			44
10	(Denmark) Johan Jokinen	1	Ret	4	1													36
11	(Italy) Matteo Beretta	5	4	10	Ret	12	16	11	10	8	8	7	7	17	8	3	Ret	34
12	(Malaysia) Fahmi Ilyas							**1**	9	**2**	14							30
13	(France) William Vermont			2	3	DSQ	3	13	8									30
14	(Belgium) Sam Dejonghe	11	13	11	9	7	13	9	12	7	3	9	2	12	10	9	Ret	28
15	(Spain) Fernando Monje	9	9	Ret	10	Ret	8	8	6	Ret	10	6	6	10	11	8	6	27
16	(Spain) Toño Fernández	6	1	5	Ret													25
17	(Spain) Nil Montserrat	3	2															20
18	(United States) Jesus Rios					5	9									12	9	9
19	(Italy) Matteo Davenia	8	10	12	11	10	11	12	Ret	10	11	10	8	11	12	10	7	8
20	(Italy) Matteo Torta	Ret	DNS	Ret	12	8	15	15	14	Ret	13	13	9	13	14	15	11	3
21	(Colombia) Tatiana Calderón											11	10	14	13	17	8	3
22	(Japan) Kotaro Sakurai							10	Ret									0
23	(Italy) Luca Orlandi	15	14	Ret	13	11	14			13	Ret	15	12	15	16	14	12	0
24	(Colombia) Francisco Diaz			14	15	Ret	Ret			12	15	14	13	16	15	16	13	0
25	(Spain) Pedro Quesada	14	Ret	15	14	DNS	DNS											0
26	(Saudi Arabia) Saud Al Faisal							14	15									0
	(Spain) Luis Villalba			Ret	Ret													0
	(Spain) Cristian Serrada											DNS	DNS			DNS	DNS	0
Guest driver ineligible for points
	(Spain) Manuel Bejarano													Ret	Ret	11	5	0
Pos	Driver	VAL (Spain)		MAG (France)		SPA (Belgium)		BRH (United Kingdom)		ALG (Portugal)		MON (Italy)		JER (Spain)		CAT (Spain)		Pts

Colour	Result
Gold	Winner
Silver	Second place
Bronze	Third place
Green	Points classification
Blue	Non-points classification
Blue	Non-classified finish (NC)
Purple	Retired, not classified (Ret)
Red	Did not qualify (DNQ)
Red	Did not pre-qualify (DNPQ)
Black	Disqualified (DSQ)
White	Did not start (DNS)
White	Withdrew (WD)
White	Race cancelled (C)
Blank	Did not practice (DNP)
Blank	Did not arrive (DNA)
Blank	Excluded (EX)

**Bold** – Pole
Italics – Fastest Lap

=== Copa F306/300 ===
- With a driver's best 14 scores counting towards the championship, points were awarded for both races as follows:

Pos	1	2	3	4	5
Points	10	8	6	4	3

Pos	Driver	VAL (Spain)		MAG (France)		SPA (Belgium)		BRH (United Kingdom)		ALG (Portugal)		MON (Italy)		JER (Spain)		CAT (Spain)		Pts
1	(Brazil) Fabio Gamberini	4	6	6	2	1	10	4	5	6	6	Ret	11	5	2	13	Ret	130
2	(Belgium) Sam Dejonghe	11	13	11	9	7	13	9	12	7	3	9	2	12	10	9	Ret	118
3	(Italy) Luca Orlandi	15	14	Ret	13	11	14			13	Ret	15	12	15	16	14	12	62
4	(Colombia) Francisco Diaz			14	15	Ret	Ret			12	15	14	13	16	15	16	13	52
5	(United States) Jesus Rios					5	9									12	9	36
6	(Spain) Pedro Quesada	14	Ret	15	14	DNS	DNS											14
7	(Saudi Arabia) Saud Al Faisal							14	15									10
8	(Japan) Kotaro Sakurai							10	Ret									6
	(Spain) Luis Villalba			Ret	Ret													0
	(Spain) Cristian Serrada											DNS	DNS			DNS	DNS	0
Guest driver ineligible for points
	(Spain) Manuel Bejarano													Ret	Ret	11	5	0
Pos	Driver	VAL (Spain)		MAG (France)		SPA (Belgium)		BRH (United Kingdom)		ALG (Portugal)		MON (Italy)		JER (Spain)		CAT (Spain)		Pts

=== Teams ===
- Points for each team's two best scoring cars were awarded for both races as follows:

Pos	1	2	3	4	5
Points	10	8	6	4	3

Pos	Team	VAL (Spain)		MAG (France)		SPA (Belgium)		BRH (United Kingdom)		ALG (Portugal)		MON (Italy)		JER (Spain)		CAT (Spain)		Pts
1	(United Kingdom) Team West-Tec	4	5	1	2	1	10	1	1	2	3	8	2	5	2	7	8	101
1	(United Kingdom) Team West-Tec	7	6	6	7	3	12	4	5	6	6	9	10	9	9	9	12	101
2	(Italy) RP Motorsport	5	4	9	6	6	2	2	2	1	2	1	4	1	4	2	1	95
2	(Italy) RP Motorsport	8	7	10	8	9	6	11	10	8	7	6	7	7	7	3	4	95
3	(Italy) Corbetta Competizioni	2	3	3	4	4	1	5	4	11	5	3	1	4	3	4	10	75
3	(Italy) Corbetta Competizioni	Ret	DNS	Ret	12	8	15	15	14	Ret	13	13	9	13	14	15	11	75
4	(Spain) De Villota Motorsport	3	2	7	5	Ret	4	7	7	3	9	2	3	2	5	1	2	70
4	(Spain) De Villota Motorsport	10	8									4	Ret	3	6	Ret	3	70
5	(Spain) Cedars	1	11	4	1	2	5	Ret	11	5	4	Ret	14	6	1	6	5	52
5	(Spain) Cedars	Ret	Ret	8	Ret									Ret	Ret	11	Ret	52
6	(Spain) Hache Team	6	1	5	14	Ret	7	3	3	4	1	12	DNS	8	17			39
6	(Spain) Hache Team			15	Ret	DNS	DNS											39
7	(France) Top F3 Team			2	3	5	3	13	8							12	9	23
7	(France) Top F3 Team					DSQ	9	14	15									23
8	(Spain) Drivex	9	9	Ret	10	Ret	8	8	6	Ret	10	6	6	10	11	8	6	0
8	(Spain) Drivex	14	Ret	Ret	Ret							DNS	DNS			DNS	DNS	0
Pos	Team	VAL (Spain)		MAG (France)		SPA (Belgium)		BRH (United Kingdom)		ALG (Portugal)		MON (Italy)		JER (Spain)		CAT (Spain)		Pts

Colour	Result
Gold	Winner
Silver	Second place
Bronze	Third place
Green	Points classification
Blue	Non-points classification
Blue	Non-classified finish (NC)
Purple	Retired, not classified (Ret)
Red	Did not qualify (DNQ)
Red	Did not pre-qualify (DNPQ)
Black	Disqualified (DSQ)
White	Did not start (DNS)
White	Withdrew (WD)
White	Race cancelled (C)
Blank	Did not practice (DNP)
Blank	Did not arrive (DNA)
Blank	Excluded (EX)
