= 2010 Formula Abarth season =

2010 Formula Abarth

Seasons
- ← 2009 2011 →

The 2010 Formula Abarth season was the sixth season of the former Formula Azzurra, and the first under its new guise of "Formula Abarth". It started on April 24 at Misano and finished on October 14 in Monza after fourteen races held at seven meetings.

Brandon Maïsano, part of the Ferrari Driver Academy scheme and driving for BVM – Target Racing, won the Alboreto Trophy as overall champion, taking four victories and three second places for a championship-winning margin of 22 points over runner-up Patric Niederhauser of the Jenzer Motorsport team. Niederhauser assumed second place in the standings after finishing the season strongly, taking seven top-five finishes in the final eight races including a victory at Varano and five third places. JD Motorsport driver Raffaele Marciello finished the season in third place, taking victories at Misano and Varano, with winless Jordi Cunill (Prema Junior) and Maxim Zimin (Jenzer Motorsport) taking five second places and two third places between them. Despite only competing in three meetings, Cunill's team-mate Hannes van Asseldonk finished the season in sixth place, taking three main race victories and two fifth places. Other victories went to Jenzer's Zoël Amberg, Prema's Riccardo Agostini, JD's Víctor Guerin and National Trophy competitor Simone Iaquinta of ARM Competition.

Iaquinta won the National Trophy, having won nine of the fourteen races in the class and taken eight top-ten overall finishes including his victory at Mugello. Having started the season at RP Motorsport, Stefano Colombo ended the season as Iaquinta's team-mate, and wrapped up second place with a class second behind Iaquinta at Monza, having taken two wins during the season at Misano and the only win at Magione, as the first race saw no finishers from the National Trophy. Federico Bonamico, who entered the season at round three, finished third for Scuderia Victoria World with one victory at Vallelunga. Simone Taloni took the other victory for Winner Motorsport at Imola. Prema Junior won the Teams' Championship by six points ahead of Jenzer Motorsport.

== Teams and drivers ==
- Drivers competing in the main Alboreto Trophy (Main championship) were numbered from 1 to 59, with drivers competing in the secondary National Trophy numbered from 71 to 99.

Team	No	Driver	Class	Rounds
(Italy) Prema Junior	2	(China) Zhang Zhi Qiang	C	All *
(Italy) Prema Junior	3	(Italy) Riccardo Agostini	C	All *
(Italy) Prema Junior	6	(Netherlands) Hannes van Asseldonk	C	5–7
(Italy) Prema Junior	7	(Spain) Jordi Cunill	C	All *
(Italy) RP Motorsport	4	(Sweden) Timmy Hansen	C	7
(Italy) RP Motorsport	43	(Italy) Mirko Merill	C	1–2
(Italy) RP Motorsport	84	(Italy) Stefano Colombo	T	1–5 *
(Italy) MG Motorsport	5	(Italy) Lorenzo Camplese	C	All *
(Italy) MG Motorsport	41	(Italy) Mirko Torsellini	C	2–5
(Italy) MG Motorsport	82	(Italy) Simone Taloni	T	6
(Italy) MG Motorsport	89	(Switzerland) Stefano Comini	T	7
(Italy) BVM – Target Racing	8	(Switzerland) Michael Heche	C	All *
(Italy) BVM – Target Racing	9	(France) Brandon Maïsano	C	All *
(Italy) BVM – Target Racing	14	(Italy) Marco Moscato	C	3
(Italy) BVM – Target Racing	66	(Argentina) Roberto Curiia	C	4–7
(Italy) Emmebi Motorsport	10	(Italy) Matteo Torta	C	5–7
(Italy) Emmebi Motorsport	33	(Italy) Niccolò Schirò	C	1–4, 6–7 *
(Italy) Emmebi Motorsport	83	(Italy) Simone Iaquinta	T	1–3, 5
(Italy) Line Race	10	(Italy) Matteo Torta	C	3–4
(Italy) Line Race	39	(Italy) Marco Moscato	C	1–2
(Italy) Alan Racing	10	(Italy) Matteo Torta	C	1–2
(Italy) Alan Racing	42	(Italy) Antonio Spavone	C	5–7
(Italy) Alan Racing	81	(Argentina) Gilles Pagani	T	1–2, 4–7
(Italy) TomCat Racing	11	(Italy) Vittoria Piria	C	1–6 *
(Italy) TomCat Racing	12	(Italy) Matteo Davenia	C	6–7
(Italy) TomCat Racing	23	(Italy) Andrea Barbirato	C	2–4, 6–7
(Italy) Durango	12	(Italy) Matteo Davenia	C	4–5 *
(Italy) Cram Competition	12	(Italy) Matteo Davenia	C	1–3
(Italy) Cram Competition	17	(Brazil) André Negrão	C	4–5 *
(Italy) Cram Competition	21	(Italy) Kevin Gilardoni	C	All
(Italy) Cram Competition	31	(Italy) Mario Marasca	C	6–7
(Italy) TP Formula	15	(Italy) Edoardo Bacci	C	1–4
(Italy) TP Formula	16	(Italy) Matteo Beretta	C	1–2
(Italy) TP Formula	64	(Italy) Mattia Brugiotti	C	3–4
(Italy) Europa Corse	18	(Italy) Cristiano Marcellan	C	1–3
(Italy) JD Motorsport	19	(Brazil) Víctor Guerin	C	All *
(Italy) JD Motorsport	53	(Italy) Raffaele Marciello	C	All *
(Switzerland) Jenzer Motorsport	24	(Italy) Eddie Cheever III	C	All *
(Switzerland) Jenzer Motorsport	25	(Switzerland) Patric Niederhauser	C	All *
(Switzerland) Jenzer Motorsport	26	(Sweden) Måns Grenhagen	C	1–4 *
(Switzerland) Jenzer Motorsport	27	(Russia) Maxim Zimin	C	All *
(Switzerland) Jenzer Motorsport	28	(Switzerland) Zoël Amberg	C	All *
(Switzerland) Jenzer Motorsport	29	(Russia) Sergey Sirotkin	C	5–7
(Italy) PKF Racing	31	(Italy) Mario Marasca	C	1–5
(Italy) BVE Racing Team	32	(Italy) Mirko Luciani	C	2–4
(Italy) BVE Racing Team	81	(Argentina) Gilles Pagani	T	3
(Italy) Scuderia Victoria World	34	(South Africa) Roman de Beer	C	All
(Italy) Scuderia Victoria World	35	(Brazil) Francisco Weiler	C	All
(Italy) Scuderia Victoria World	36	(Italy) Federico Bonamico	T	3–7
(Italy) Monolite Racing	41	(Italy) Mirko Torsellini	C	1
(Italy) Monolite Racing	88	(Italy) Sheban Kamal Siddiqi	T	4
(Italy) CO2 Motorsport	42	(Italy) Vincenzo Spavone	C	4
(Italy) ARM Competition	42	(Italy) Vincenzo Spavone	C	1–3
(Italy) ARM Competition	43	(Italy) Mirko Merillo	C	3–4
(Italy) ARM Competition	83	(Italy) Simone Iaquinta	T	4, 6–7
(Italy) ARM Competition	84	(Italy) Stefano Colombo	T	6–7
Team Costa Rica	45	(Puerto Rico) Riccardo Vera	C	All
(Italy) Uboldi Corse	55	(Italy) Luca Defendi	C	1–6
(Italy) Winner Motorsport	82	(Italy) Simone Taloni	T	1–5
(Italy) Diegi Motorsport	87	(Brazil) Josef Feffer	T	All
(Italy) AB Motorsport	68	(Italy) Andrea Boffo	C	7

Icon	Class
C	Championship – Alboreto Trophy
T	National Trophy

* Drivers who participated in the non-championship round at Spa-Francorchamps.

== Race calendar and results ==
All rounds, excluding Magione (that was part of Italian GT Championship weekend) supported the Italian Formula Three Championship. In the view of a future international series, a non-championship round was held on the weekend of June 25–27 at Circuit de Spa-Francorchamps, supporting International GT Open, Auto GP and European F3 Open rounds.

Round		Circuit	Location	Date	Pole position	Fastest lap	Winning driver	Winning team
1	R1	Misano World Circuit	Emilia-Romagna, Italy	24 April	(Italy) Kevin Gilardoni	(Italy) Raffaele Marciello	(Italy) Raffaele Marciello	(Italy) JD Motorsport
1	R2	Misano World Circuit	Emilia-Romagna, Italy	25 April		(Russia) Maxim Zimin	(Switzerland) Zoël Amberg	(Switzerland) Jenzer Motorsport
2	R1	Autodromo dell'Umbria, Magione	Umbria, Italy	6 June	(France) Brandon Maïsano	(France) Brandon Maïsano	(France) Brandon Maïsano	(Italy) BVM – Target Racing
2	R2	Autodromo dell'Umbria, Magione	Umbria, Italy	6 June		(France) Brandon Maïsano	(Brazil) Víctor Guerin	(Italy) JD Motorsport
NC	R1	Circuit de Spa-Francorchamps	Belgium	26 June	(Brazil) André Negrão	(Brazil) André Negrão	(Brazil) André Negrão	(Italy) Cram Competition
NC	R2	Circuit de Spa-Francorchamps	Belgium	27 June		(Italy) Raffaele Marciello	(Italy) Raffaele Marciello	(Italy) JD Motorsport
3	R1	Autodromo Enzo e Dino Ferrari, Imola	Emilia-Romagna, Italy	4 July	(Italy) Riccardo Agostini	(Italy) Riccardo Agostini	(Italy) Riccardo Agostini	(Italy) Prema Junior
3	R2	Autodromo Enzo e Dino Ferrari, Imola	Emilia-Romagna, Italy	4 July		(Brazil) Víctor Guerin	(France) Brandon Maïsano	(Italy) BVM – Target Racing
4	R1	Autodromo Riccardo Paletti, Varano	Emilia-Romagna, Italy	29 August	(Switzerland) Patric Niederhauser	(Switzerland) Patric Niederhauser	(Switzerland) Patric Niederhauser	(Switzerland) Jenzer Motorsport
4	R2	Autodromo Riccardo Paletti, Varano	Emilia-Romagna, Italy	29 August		(France) Brandon Maïsano	(Italy) Raffaele Marciello	(Italy) JD Motorsport
5	R1	Vallelunga Circuit	Lazio, Italy	26 September	(Russia) Maxim Zimin	(Netherlands) Hannes van Asseldonk	(Netherlands) Hannes van Asseldonk	(Italy) Prema Junior
5	R2	Vallelunga Circuit	Lazio, Italy	26 September		(France) Brandon Maïsano	(France) Brandon Maïsano	(Italy) BVM – Target Racing
6	R1	Mugello Circuit	Tuscany, Italy	10 October	(Netherlands) Hannes van Asseldonk	(Russia) Maxim Zimin	(Netherlands) Hannes van Asseldonk	(Italy) Prema Junior
6	R2	Mugello Circuit	Tuscany, Italy	10 October		(Italy) Simone Iaquinta	(Italy) Simone Iaquinta	(Italy) ARM Competition
7	R1	Autodromo Nazionale Monza	Lombardy, Italy	23 October	(France) Brandon Maïsano	(Russia) Maxim Zimin	(Netherlands) Hannes van Asseldonk	(Italy) Prema Junior
7	R2	Autodromo Nazionale Monza	Lombardy, Italy	24 October		(Sweden) Timmy Hansen	(France) Brandon Maïsano	(Italy) BVM – Target Racing

== Standings ==
- Points were awarded as follows:

	1	2	3	4	5	6	7	8	9	10	PP	FL
Race 1	20	15	12	10	8	6	4	3	2	1	**1**	1
Race 2	13	11	9	8	6	5	4	3	2	1		1

=== Drivers' standings ===
Pos	Driver	MIS (Italy)		MGI (Italy)		SPA ‡ (Belgium)		IMO (Italy)		VAR (Italy)		VLL (Italy)		MUG (Italy)		MNZ (Italy)		Points
Alboreto Trophy
1	(France) Brandon Maïsano	16	11	**1**	2	4	Ret	2	1	8	2	5	1	10	10	**4**	1	128
2	(Switzerland) Patric Niederhauser	9	6	21	11	3	5	6	5	**1**	27	3	3	3	3	5	3	106
3	(Italy) Raffaele Marciello	1	3	2	Ret	6	1	Ret	DNS	7	1	4	4	7	7	24	Ret	91
4	(Spain) Jordi Cunill	8	2	3	5	Ret	9	4	32	10	7	8	Ret	5	2	Ret	4	82
5	(Russia) Maxim Zimin	3	5	7	Ret	2	Ret	Ret	33	13	10	**2**	8	2	9	2	Ret	80
6	(Netherlands) Hannes van Asseldonk											1	5	**1**	5	1	Ret	76
7	(Switzerland) Zoël Amberg	6	1	6	Ret	Ret	6	8	6	Ret	12	10	15	4	4	27	7	58
8	(Italy) Kevin Gilardoni	**2**	10	Ret	19			5	3	11	11	6	7	15	22	7	8	55
9	(South Africa) Roman de Beer	17	Ret	16	Ret			3	4	3	8	16	2	19	23	11	6	53
10	(Italy) Eddie Cheever III	7	7	17	6	8	8	11	15	6	3	14	9	9	6	8	5	52
11	(Italy) Riccardo Agostini	19	17	Ret	15	9	2	**1**	2	4	26	7	12	17	Ret	10	12	49
12	(Italy) Edoardo Bacci	4	4	Ret	3			7	31	16	18							31
13	(Brazil) Victor Guerin	13	16	5	1	5	3	30	28	DNQ	DNQ	Ret	13	12	Ret	6	22	29
14	(Brazil) André Negrão					**1**	4			2	4	Ret	17					23
15	(Sweden) Måns Grenhagen	25	9	4	4	7	7	Ret	Ret	22	16							20
16	(Italy) Lorenzo Camplese	28	13	12	8	10	11	13	12	5	5	Ret	11	25	15	16	Ret	20
17	(China) Zhang Zhi Qiang	18	Ret	13	Ret	15	13	28	7	Ret	15	12	16	13	Ret	3	13	16
18	(Russia) Sergey Sirotkin											9	10	11	8	13	11	12
19	(Italy) Matteo Davenia	5	26	DNQ	DNQ	12	16	10	18	17	23	23	22	24	Ret	Ret	14	9
20	(Italy) Marco Moscato	Ret	21	8	9			Ret	10									8
21	(Switzerland) Michael Heche	26	Ret	Ret	13	Ret	10	9	34	Ret	17	24	14	18	Ret	12	9	5
22	(Italy) Mirko Torsellini	14	12	11	7			Ret	35	21	13	17	18					4
23	(Puerto Rico) Riccardo Vera	15	8	DNQ	DNQ			16	17	20	19	21	21	21	11	Ret	18	4
24	(Italy) Vincenzo Spavone	30	24	DNQ	DNQ			26	29	14	9							3
25	(Sweden) Timmy Hansen															9	25	3
26	(Italy) Mirko Luciani			9	Ret			22	19	19	20							2
27	(Brazil) Francisco Weiler	12	Ret	DNQ	DNQ			29	13	DNQ	DNQ	Ret	DNS	23	19	26	Ret	2
28	(Italy) Luca Defendi	22	20	10	12			DSQ	DSQ	Ret	Ret	13	Ret	16	18			1
29	(Italy) Niccolò Schirò	23	18	19	Ret	13	15	20	16	Ret	21	11	Ret	22	Ret	18	19	0
30	(Italy) Mario Marasca	24	29	14	14			12	20	DNQ	DNQ	22	23	Ret	12	19	15	0
31	(Italy) Antonio Spavone											Ret	Ret	27	14	22	17	0
32	(Argentina) Roberto Curia									DNQ	DNQ	18	DNS	14	Ret	Ret	Ret	0
33	(Italy) Mirko Merillo	32	25	15	17			30	26	23	22							0
34	(Italy) Vittoria Piria	20	Ret	20	16	14	14	18	25	DNQ	DNQ	Ret	Ret	26	Ret			0
35	(Italy) Matteo Torta	31	22	DNQ	DNQ			23	Ret	DNQ	DNQ	19	25	Ret	17	23	24	0
36	(Italy) Matteo Beretta	27	23	18	18													0
37	(Italy) Mattia Brugiotti							21	22	18	20							0
38	(Italy) Cristiano Marcellan	29	28	DNQ	DNQ			19	24									0
39	(Italy) Andrea Barbirato			DNQ	DNQ			25	30	DNQ	DNQ			30	20	25	21	0
40	(Italy) Andrea Boffo															21	23	0
National Trophy
1	(Italy) Simone Iaquinta	10	Ret	Ret	Ret			27	9	9	6	Ret	6	6	1	14	2	120
2	(Italy) Stefano Colombo	11	14	Ret	10	11	12	17	11	12	14	Ret	DNS	8	Ret	Ret	10	101
3	(Italy) Federico Bonamico							Ret	23	15	25	15	19	29	13	17	16	98
4	(Argentina) Gilles Pagani	21	15	Ret	Ret			15	14	DNQ	DNQ	20	20	Ret	Ret			78
5	(Italy) Simone Taloni	Ret	19	DNQ	DNQ			14	21	DNQ	DNQ	Ret	24	20	16			61
6	(Brazil) Josef Feffer	Ret	27	DNQ	DNQ			24	27	DNQ	DNQ	Ret	Ret	28	21	20	20	59
7	(Switzerland) Stefano Comini															15	Ret	15
	(Italy) Sheban Kamal Siddiqi									DNQ	DNQ							0
Pos	Driver	MIS (Italy)		MGI (Italy)		SPA ‡ (Belgium)		IMO (Italy)		VAR (Italy)		VLL (Italy)		MUG (Italy)		MNZ (Italy)		Points

Colour	Result
Gold	Winner
Silver	Second place
Bronze	Third place
Green	Points classification
Blue	Non-points classification
Blue	Non-classified finish (NC)
Purple	Retired, not classified (Ret)
Red	Did not qualify (DNQ)
Red	Did not pre-qualify (DNPQ)
Black	Disqualified (DSQ)
White	Did not start (DNS)
White	Withdrew (WD)
White	Race cancelled (C)
Blank	Did not practice (DNP)
Blank	Did not arrive (DNA)
Blank	Excluded (EX)

**Bold** – Pole
Italics – Fastest Lap

‡ Round at Spa-Francorchamps was non-championship, no points awarded.

=== Teams' Standings ===
The person or company that entered the race application for a driver was considered Competitor P.G. or Team. In a such situation, for example, Matteo Davenia competed at Imola for Durango, physically driving a Cram Competition car. Only Competitors P.G. and Teams holding a valid ACI license for the current season were awarded points.

Pos	Team	MIS (Italy)		MGI (Italy)		SPA ‡ (Belgium)		IMO (Italy)		VAR (Italy)		VLL (Italy)		MUG (Italy)		MNZ (Italy)		Points
1	(Italy) Prema Junior	8	2	3	5	9	2	1	2	4	7	1	5	1	2	1	4	166
2	(Switzerland) Jenzer Motorsport	3	1	4	4	2	5	6	5	1	3	2	3	2	3	2	3	160
3	(Italy) BVM – Target Racing	16	11	1	2	4	10	2	1	8	2	5	1	10	10	4	1	122
4	(Italy) JD Motorsport	1	3	2	1	5	1	30	28	7	1	4	13	7	7	6	22	101
5	(Italy) Cram Competition	2	10	Ret	19	1	4	5	3	2	4	6	7	15	12	7	8	75
6	(Italy) TP Formula	4	4	18	3			7	22	16	18							31
7	Team Costa Rica	15	8	DNQ	DNQ			16	17	20	19	21	21	21	11	Ret	18	4
8	(Italy) CO2 Motorsport									14	9							3
9	(Italy) RP Motorsport	32	25	15	17											9	25	2
10	(Italy) BVE Racing Team			9	Ret			22	19	19	20							2
11	(Italy) Durango							10	18	17	23	23	22					1
Pos	Team	MIS (Italy)		MGI (Italy)		SPA ‡ (Belgium)		IMO (Italy)		VAR (Italy)		VLL (Italy)		MUG (Italy)		MNZ (Italy)		Points

Colour	Result
Gold	Winner
Silver	Second place
Bronze	Third place
Green	Points classification
Blue	Non-points classification
Blue	Non-classified finish (NC)
Purple	Retired, not classified (Ret)
Red	Did not qualify (DNQ)
Red	Did not pre-qualify (DNPQ)
Black	Disqualified (DSQ)
White	Did not start (DNS)
White	Withdrew (WD)
White	Race cancelled (C)
Blank	Did not practice (DNP)
Blank	Did not arrive (DNA)
Blank	Excluded (EX)

‡ Round at Spa-Francorchamps was non-championship, no points awarded.
