= 2010 European F3 Open Championship =

Motor racing competition

Seasons
- ← 2009 2011 →

The 2010 European F3 Open Championship was the second European F3 Open Championship season. The season began on 17 April at Circuit Ricardo Tormo in Valencia, and finished on 31 October at Circuit de Catalunya in Montmeló after 16 races run at eight meetings, four held in Spain, as well as meetings held in Belgium, France, the United Kingdom and Italy.

Marco Barba, the 2007 series runner-up, finished the season as champion for the Lebanese team Cedars Motorsport, having clinched the title with a meeting to spare at Jerez. Barba, who stepped down from the Formula Renault 3.5 Series to contest the series, won six races and collected eleven podiums as he finished more than 40 points clear of the field. Second place was claimed by Team West-Tec's Callum MacLeod via countback, having finished tied on points with RP Motorsport's David Fumanelli. Both drivers could not be separated on victories, as they each won three races, but MacLeod's four second places enabled to finish ahead of Fumanelli, who claimed just one runner-up placing. Kevin Ceccon and Toño Fernández completed the top five in the championship standings, each taking one victory during the season, coming at Catalunya and Brands Hatch respectively. The two other race victors came from the secondary Copa de España class, with Drivex driver Aaron Filgueira winning at Spa-Francorchamps, and MacLeod's team-mate Victor Corrêa won at Monza, having moved up from Formula Renault UK midway through the season.

Cedars Motorsport also triumphed in the Copa de España for older-specification machinery. Noel Jammal finished the season with five victories, and finished at the head of the standings by five points. Title rival Filgueira had led the standings by three points heading into the final race weekend in Catalunya, but a double retirement coupled with Jammal's second place in the opening race allowed the Lebanese driver to top the points at season's end; he claimed four wins and ten podiums, and managed to just fend off Luis Villalba of the Hache Team by four points, a winner of three races. Nil Montserrat, Corrêa (2) and Vincent Beltoise took the season's other victories. Cedars Motorsport completed a clean sweep, winning the teams' championship by 24 points ahead of Team West-Tec and 25 clear of RP Motorsport.

== Teams and drivers ==
- All cars were powered by Toyota engines. Main class powered by Dallara F308, while Copa Class by Dallara F306 chassis.

Team	No	Driver	Rounds
Class A
(Spain) Drivex	3	(Spain) José Luis Abadín	1–3, 5–6
(Spain) Drivex	3	(Spain) Pedro Quesada	7–8
(Italy) RP Motorsport	4	(Venezuela) Biagio Bulnes	All
(Italy) RP Motorsport	5	(Italy) Kevin Ceccon	All
(Italy) RP Motorsport	6	(Italy) David Fumanelli	All
(Italy) RP Motorsport	18	(Italy) Matteo Beretta	6–8
(Spain) De Villota Motorsport	7	(Mexico) Juan Carlos Sistos	All
(Spain) De Villota Motorsport	8	(Spain) Fernando Monje	All
(Spain) De Villota Motorsport	9	(Spain) Carlos Sainz Jr.	7–8
(France) MP Racing	10	(France) Emmanuel Piget	1–2, 4
(Spain) Porteiro Motorsport	11	(Spain) Carlos Muñoz	3
(Lebanon) Cedars Motorsport	14	(Spain) Marco Barba	All
(France) Top F3 Team	15	(France) Romain Vozniak	1
(Spain) Q8 Oils Hache Team	17	(Spain) Toño Fernández	All
(United Kingdom) Motul Team West-Tec	55	(United Kingdom) Callum MacLeod	1–7
Copa F306/300
(Spain) Drivex	22	(Spain) Aaron Filgueira	All
(Italy) RP Motorsport	23	(Spain) Pedro Quesada	1–4
(Italy) RP Motorsport	23	(Italy) Matteo Beretta	5
(Spain) Q8 Oils Hache Team	28	(Spain) José Manuel Fernández	1
(Spain) Q8 Oils Hache Team	28	(France) Pierre Combot	2
(Spain) Q8 Oils Hache Team	28	(Spain) Nil Montserrat	3–8
(Spain) Q8 Oils Hache Team	29	(Spain) Luis Villalba	All
(Lebanon) Cedars Motorsport	33	(Lebanon) Noel Jammal	All
(France) Top F3 Team	34	(Spain) Nil Montserrat	1–2
(France) Top F3 Team	34	(France) Vincent Beltoise	4
(United Kingdom) Motul Team West-Tec	66	(Spain) Ramón Piñeiro	2
(United Kingdom) Motul Team West-Tec	66	(Iceland) Kristján Einar	3
(United Kingdom) Motul Team West-Tec	81	(Macau) Michael Ho	5–8
(United Kingdom) Motul Team West-Tec	88	(Brazil) Victor Corrêa	3–8

== Race calendar and results ==
- The calendar was announced by the FIA on December 18, 2009. The calendar was later amended on February 8, 2010.

Round		Circuit	Date	Pole position	Fastest lap	Winning driver	Winning team
1	R1	(Spain) Circuit Ricardo Tormo, Valencia	17 April	(Spain) Fernando Monje	(Mexico) Juan Carlos Sistos	(Spain) Marco Barba	(Lebanon) Cedars Motorsport
1	R2	(Spain) Circuit Ricardo Tormo, Valencia	18 April		(Spain) Marco Barba	(United Kingdom) Callum MacLeod	(United Kingdom) Motul Team West-Tec
2	R1	(Spain) Circuito del Jarama	5 June	(Spain) Marco Barba	(Spain) Marco Barba	(Spain) Marco Barba	(Lebanon) Cedars Motorsport
2	R2	(Spain) Circuito del Jarama	6 June		(Spain) Aaron Filgueira	(United Kingdom) Callum MacLeod	(United Kingdom) Motul Team West-Tec
3	R1	(Belgium) Circuit de Spa-Francorchamps	26 June	(Italy) David Fumanelli	(Spain) Toño Fernández	(Spain) Marco Barba	(Lebanon) Cedars Motorsport
3	R2	(Belgium) Circuit de Spa-Francorchamps	27 June		(United Kingdom) Callum MacLeod	(Spain) Aaron Filgueira	(Spain) Drivex
4	R1	(France) Circuit de Nevers Magny-Cours	10 July	(Spain) Marco Barba	(Spain) Toño Fernández	(Italy) David Fumanelli	(Italy) RP Motorsport
4	R2	(France) Circuit de Nevers Magny-Cours	11 July		(Spain) Marco Barba	(Spain) Marco Barba	(Lebanon) Cedars Motorsport
5	R1	(United Kingdom) Brands Hatch	18 September	(United Kingdom) Callum MacLeod	(Spain) Marco Barba	(Spain) Marco Barba	(Lebanon) Cedars Motorsport
5	R2	(United Kingdom) Brands Hatch	19 September		(Spain) Fernando Monje	(Spain) Toño Fernández	(Spain) Q8 Oils Hache Team
6	R1	(Italy) Autodromo Nazionale Monza	2 October	(Spain) Marco Barba	(Spain) Marco Barba	(Spain) Marco Barba	(Lebanon) Cedars Motorsport
6	R2	(Italy) Autodromo Nazionale Monza	3 October		(Spain) Marco Barba	(Brazil) Victor Corrêa	(United Kingdom) Motul Team West-Tec
7	R1	(Spain) Circuito de Jerez	16 October	(Italy) David Fumanelli	(Italy) David Fumanelli	(Italy) David Fumanelli	(Italy) RP Motorsport
7	R2	(Spain) Circuito de Jerez	17 October		(Spain) Marco Barba	(United Kingdom) Callum MacLeod	(United Kingdom) Motul Team West-Tec
8	R1	(Spain) Circuit de Catalunya	30 October	(Italy) David Fumanelli	(Italy) David Fumanelli	(Italy) Kevin Ceccon	(Italy) RP Motorsport
8	R2	(Spain) Circuit de Catalunya	31 October		(Spain) Marco Barba	(Italy) David Fumanelli	(Italy) RP Motorsport

== Championship standings ==
=== Class A ===
- Points were awarded as follows:

	1	2	3	4	5	6	7	8	9	PP	FL
Race 1	14	12	10	8	6	5	3	2	1	**1**	1
Race 2	12	10	8	6	5	4	3	2	1	0	1

Pos	Driver	VAL (Spain)		JAR (Spain)		SPA (Belgium)		MAG (France)		BRH (United Kingdom)		MON (Italy)		JER (Spain)		CAT (Spain)		Pts
1	(Spain) Marco Barba	1	2	**1**	3	1	4	**DSQ**	1	1	4	**1**	2	3	2	Ret	9	154
2	(United Kingdom) Callum MacLeod	2	1	6	1	2	2	5	Ret	**2**	3	7	Ret	6	1			112
3	(Italy) David Fumanelli	4	6	7	5	**7**	Ret	1	8	3	6	2	Ret	**1**	4	**4**	1	112
4	(Italy) Kevin Ceccon	3	8	2	4	12	7	6	Ret	7	5	3	13	2	14	1	2	92
5	(Spain) Toño Fernández	5	5	Ret	Ret	6	3	2	7	6	1	4	DSQ	7	Ret	2	DSQ	83
6	(Spain) Fernando Monje	**Ret**	9	8	12	Ret	8	7	3	4	2	9	9	12	10	6	8	46
7	(Spain) José Luis Abadín	8	4	3	2	5	5			8	Ret	Ret	8					43
8	(Spain) Aaron Filgueira	12	Ret	9	6	3	1	Ret	10	10	8	8	12	4	DNS	Ret	Ret	40
9	(Mexico) Juan Carlos Sistos	6	7	Ret	8	9	Ret	13	4	5	Ret	Ret	11	Ret	11	7	3	37
10	(France) Emmanuel Piget	7	3	5	Ret			3	5									32
11	(Venezuela) Biagio Bulnes	DSQ	11	Ret	Ret	10	Ret	4	2	Ret	Ret	6	10	9	Ret	14	4	31
12	(Brazil) Victor Corrêa					8	6	11	Ret	Ret	Ret	5	1	10	7	11	11	28
13	(Lebanon) Noel Jammal	9	Ret	4	11	14	Ret	8	11	9	7	10	6	14	6	10	Ret	24
14	(Spain) Luis Villalba	Ret	12	10	7	11	Ret	9	12	12	Ret	14	7	8	5	12	6	19
15	(Spain) Pedro Quesada	13	14	12	14	15	9	Ret	9					11	3	8	5	18
16	(Spain) Nil Montserrat	11	13	Ret	9	13	11	10	Ret	Ret	11	12	3	13	8	9	7	16
17	(Italy) Matteo Beretta									11	9	11	4	15	9	5	12	16
18	(Spain) Carlos Muñoz					4	Ret											8
19	(Macau) Michael Ho									13	10	13	5	16	13	13	10	5
20	(France) Vincent Beltoise							12	6									4
21	(France) Romain Vozniak	10	10															0
22	(Spain) Ramón Piñeiro			11	10													0
23	(Iceland) Kristján Einar					16	10											0
24	(France) Pierre Combot			Ret	13													0
25	(Spain) José Manuel Fernández	Ret	15															0
guest driver ineligible for points
	(Spain) Carlos Sainz Jr.													5	12	3	13	0
Pos	Driver	VAL (Spain)		JAR (Spain)		SPA (Belgium)		MAG (France)		BRH (United Kingdom)		MON (Italy)		JER (Spain)		CAT (Spain)		Pts

Colour	Result
Gold	Winner
Silver	Second place
Bronze	Third place
Green	Points classification
Blue	Non-points classification
Blue	Non-classified finish (NC)
Purple	Retired, not classified (Ret)
Red	Did not qualify (DNQ)
Red	Did not pre-qualify (DNPQ)
Black	Disqualified (DSQ)
White	Did not start (DNS)
White	Withdrew (WD)
White	Race cancelled (C)
Blank	Did not practice (DNP)
Blank	Did not arrive (DNA)
Blank	Excluded (EX)

**Bold** – Pole
Italics – Fastest Lap

=== Copa F306/300 ===
- Points were awarded for both races as follows:

Pos	1	2	3	4	5
Points	10	8	6	4	3

Pos	Driver	VAL (Spain)		JAR (Spain)		SPA (Belgium)		MAG (France)		BRH (United Kingdom)		MON (Italy)		JER (Spain)		CAT (Spain)		Pts
1	(Lebanon) Noel Jammal	1	Ret	1	5	5	Ret	1	4	1	1	3	4	5	2	2	Ret	89
2	(Spain) Aaron Filgueira	3	Ret	2	1	1	1	Ret	3	2	2	2	6	1	DNS	Ret	Ret	84
3	(Spain) Luis Villalba	Ret	1	3	2	3	Ret	2	5	4	Ret	6	5	2	1	4	1	80
4	(Spain) Nil Montserrat	2	2	Ret	3	4	5	3	Ret	Ret	5	4	2	4	4	1	2	76
5	(Brazil) Victor Corrêa					2	2	4	Ret	Ret	Ret	1	1	3	3	3	4	62
6	(Macau) Michael Ho									5	4	5	3	6	5	5	3	28
7	(Spain) Pedro Quesada	4	3	5	Ret	6	3	Ret	2									27
8	(France) Vincent Beltoise							5	1									13
9	(Italy) Matteo Beretta									3	3							12
10	(Spain) Ramón Piñeiro			4	4													8
11	(Iceland) Kristján Einar					7	4											4
12	(Spain) José Manuel Fernández	Ret	4															4
13	(France) Pierre Combot			Ret	6													0
Pos	Driver	VAL (Spain)		JAR (Spain)		SPA (Belgium)		MAG (France)		BRH (United Kingdom)		MON (Italy)		JER (Spain)		CAT (Spain)		Pts

Colour	Result
Gold	Winner
Silver	Second place
Bronze	Third place
Green	Points classification
Blue	Non-points classification
Blue	Non-classified finish (NC)
Purple	Retired, not classified (Ret)
Red	Did not qualify (DNQ)
Red	Did not pre-qualify (DNPQ)
Black	Disqualified (DSQ)
White	Did not start (DNS)
White	Withdrew (WD)
White	Race cancelled (C)
Blank	Did not practice (DNP)
Blank	Did not arrive (DNA)
Blank	Excluded (EX)

=== Team Standings ===
- Points for each team's best scoring chassis were awarded for both races as follows:

Pos	1	2	3	4	5
Points	10	8	6	4	3

Pos	Team	Car No.	VAL (Spain)		JAR (Spain)		SPA (Belgium)		MAG (France)		BRH (United Kingdom)		MON (Italy)		JER (Spain)		CAT (Spain)		Pts
1	(Lebanon) Cedars Motorsport	14	1	2	1	3	1	4	DSQ	1	1	4	1	2	3	2	Ret	9	116
1	(Lebanon) Cedars Motorsport	33	9	Ret	4	11	14	Ret	8	11	9	7	10	6	14	6	10	Ret	116
2	(United Kingdom) Motul Team West-Tec	55	2	1	6	1	2	2	5	Ret	2	3	7	Ret	6	1			92
2	(United Kingdom) Motul Team West-Tec	66			11	10	16	10											92
2	(United Kingdom) Motul Team West-Tec	81									13	10	13	5	16	13	13	10	92
2	(United Kingdom) Motul Team West-Tec	88					8	6	11	Ret	Ret	Ret	5	1	10	7	11	11	92
3	(Italy) RP Motorsport	4	DSQ	11	Ret	Ret	10	Ret	4	2	Ret	Ret	6	10	9	Ret	14	4	91
3	(Italy) RP Motorsport	5	3	8	2	4	12	7	6	Ret	7	5	3	13	2	14	1	2	91
3	(Italy) RP Motorsport	6	4	6	7	5	7	Ret	1	8	3	6	2	Ret	1	4	4	1	91
3	(Italy) RP Motorsport	18											11	4	15	9	5	12	91
3	(Italy) RP Motorsport	23	13	14	12	14	15	9	Ret	9	11	9							91
4	(Spain) Drivex	3	8	4	3	2	5	5			8	Ret	Ret	8	11	3	8	5	65
4	(Spain) Drivex	22	12	Ret	9	6	3	1	Ret	10	10	8	8	12	4	DNS	Ret	Ret	65
5	(Spain) Q8 Oils Hache Team	17	5	5	Ret	Ret	6	3	2	7	6	1	4	DSQ	7	Ret	2	DSQ	64
5	(Spain) Q8 Oils Hache Team	28	Ret	15	Ret	13	13	11	10	Ret	Ret	11	12	3	13	8	9	7	64
5	(Spain) Q8 Oils Hache Team	29	Ret	12	10	7	11	Ret	9	12	12	Ret	14	7	8	5	12	6	64
6	(Spain) De Villota Motorsport	7	6	7	Ret	8	9	Ret	13	4	5	Ret	Ret	9	Ret	11	7	3	42
6	(Spain) De Villota Motorsport	8	Ret	9	8	12	Ret	8	7	3	4	2	9	11	12	10	6	8	42
6	(Spain) De Villota Motorsport	9													5	12	3	13	42
7	(France) MP Racing	10	7	3	5	Ret			3	5									19
8	(Spain) Porteiro Motorsport	11					4	Ret											4
9	(France) Top F3 Team	15	10	10															3
9	(France) Top F3 Team	34	11	13	Ret	9			12	6									3
Pos	Team	Car No.	VAL (Spain)		JAR (Spain)		SPA (Belgium)		MAG (France)		BRH (United Kingdom)		MON (Italy)		JER (Spain)		CAT (Spain)		Pts

Colour	Result
Gold	Winner
Silver	Second place
Bronze	Third place
Green	Points classification
Blue	Non-points classification
Blue	Non-classified finish (NC)
Purple	Retired, not classified (Ret)
Red	Did not qualify (DNQ)
Red	Did not pre-qualify (DNPQ)
Black	Disqualified (DSQ)
White	Did not start (DNS)
White	Withdrew (WD)
White	Race cancelled (C)
Blank	Did not practice (DNP)
Blank	Did not arrive (DNA)
Blank	Excluded (EX)
