= 2013 European F3 Open Championship =

Motor racing competition

Seasons
- ← 2012 2014 →

The 2013 European F3 Open Championship was the fifth and final season European F3 Open Championship .

Despite missing the opening round of the season, Ed Jones of Team West-Tec was crowned champion by nine points on dropped scores over RP Motorsport driver Sandy Stuvik. The final championship standings were determined after two appeals had been lodged, and upheld, with the Real Automóvil Club de España.

== Teams and drivers ==
- All cars were powered by Toyota engines. All Class A cars are equipped with the Dallara F312 chassis, while Copa Class cars are equipped with the Dallara F308 chassis.

Team	No.	Driver	Rounds
Class A
(Italy) RP Motorsport	1	(Thailand) Sandy Stuvik	NC1, NC2, All
(Italy) RP Motorsport	2	(Uruguay) Santiago Urrutia	NC1, NC2, All
(Italy) RP Motorsport	27	(Spain) Alexander Toril	All
(Italy) RP Motorsport	29	(France) Alexandre Cougnaud	NC1, All
(Italy) RP Motorsport	29	(Italy) Vittoria Piria	NC2
(Spain) EmiliodeVillota Motorsport	3	(Israel) Yarin Stern	NC2, All
(Spain) EmiliodeVillota Motorsport	4	(Guatemala) Andrés Saravia	NC1, NC2, All
(Spain) EmiliodeVillota Motorsport	5	(Russia) Alexey Chuklin	NC1, NC2, All
(Spain) EmiliodeVillota Motorsport	6	(United Kingdom) Hector Hurst	NC1, NC2, 1–7
(Spain) EmiliodeVillota Motorsport	6	(Colombia) Tatiana Calderón	8
(Spain) Campos Racing	7	(Russia) Denis Nagulin	NC1, NC2, All
(Spain) Campos Racing	8	(Venezuela) Valeria Carballo	NC1, NC2, All
(Spain) Campos Racing	9	(Poland) Artur Janosz	NC1, NC2, All
(United Kingdom) Team West-Tec F3	10	(Venezuela) Roberto La Rocca	1–3
(United Kingdom) Team West-Tec F3	10	(United Kingdom) Emil Bernstorff	5
(United Kingdom) Team West-Tec F3	10	(United Kingdom) Jonathan Legris	6
(United Kingdom) Team West-Tec F3	10	(China) Huan Zhu	7–8
(United Kingdom) Team West-Tec F3	11	(United Arab Emirates) Ed Jones	NC1, NC2, 2–8
(United Kingdom) Team West-Tec F3	12	(Canada) Nelson Mason	NC1, NC2, All
(United Kingdom) Team West-Tec F3	13	(Italy) Luca Orlandi	NC1, NC2, 1–5
(United Kingdom) Team West-Tec F3	13	(Norway) Falco Wauer	7
(United Kingdom) Team West-Tec F3	13	(United Kingdom) Hector Hurst	8
(United Kingdom) Team West-Tec F3	81	(United States) Spencer Pigot	1
(France) Top F3	14	(Italy) Mattia Vita	1–3
(Italy) BVM Racing	15	(Italy) Mario Marasca	All
(Italy) BVM Racing	16	(Italy) Vittoria Piria	All
(Italy) DAV Racing	17	(France) Jordan Perroy	NC1
(Italy) DAV Racing	17	(France) Brandon Maïsano	6
(Italy) DAV Racing	17	(Germany) Nicolas Pohler	7–8
(Italy) Corbetta Competizioni	19	(Italy) Damiano Fioravanti	7–8
Copa F308/300
(Italy) RP Motorsport	21	(Spain) Alexander Toril	NC1, NC2
(Italy) RP Motorsport	21	(Saudi Arabia) Saud Al Faisal	All
(Italy) RP Motorsport	35	(Italy) Costantino Peroni	8
(Spain) EmiliodeVillota Motorsport	22	(South Korea) Che One Lim	NC2, All
(Spain) EmiliodeVillota Motorsport	30	(South Korea) Che One Lim	NC1
(Spain) EmiliodeVillota Motorsport	23	(Spain) Igor Urien	NC2, All
(Spain) EmiliodeVillota Motorsport	31	(Spain) Igor Urien	NC1
(Italy) DAV Racing	24	(Germany) Nicolas Pohler	1–6
(Italy) DAV Racing	26	(Germany) Nicolas Pohler	NC1, NC2
(Italy) DAV Racing	77	(Italy) Matteo Davenia	NC1
(Italy) DAV Racing	77	(Mexico) Gerardo Nieto	NC2, All
(France) Top F3	28	(Italy) Mattia Vita	NC1
(Italy) Corbetta Competizioni	32	(Italy) Damiano Fioravanti	NC2, 1–6
(Italy) Corbetta Competizioni	32	(Colombia) William Barbosa	8
(Italy) Corbetta Competizioni	53	(Italy) Lorenzo Paggi	NC1, NC2, 1–5
(Italy) Corbetta Competizioni	72	(Italy) Tommaso Menchini	All
(United Kingdom) Team West-Tec F3	33	(United Kingdom) Sean Walkinshaw	NC1, NC2, All
(United Kingdom) Team West-Tec F3	55	(China) Huan Zhu	1–6
(United Kingdom) Team West-Tec F3	66	(United Kingdom) Cameron Twynham	NC1, All
(United Kingdom) Team West-Tec F3	88	(South Africa) Liam Venter	NC1, NC2, 1–7
(United Kingdom) Team West-Tec F3	88	(Austria) Christopher Höher	8
(Spain) Drivex School	34	(Slovakia) Richard Gonda	NC1, NC2, All
(Italy) MKTG	35	(Venezuela) Trino Rojas	4–7

== Race calendar and results ==
- An eight-round provisional calendar was revealed on 2 November 2012. This was modified on 7 February 2013, after GT Sport organisers, for practical and technical reasons, moved the Algarve event one week earlier and replaced the Hungaroring event with a race in Jerez, moving it two weeks earlier. All rounds will support the International GT Open series.

Round		Circuit	Date	Pole position	Fastest lap	Winning driver	Winning team	Copa Winner
NC	R1	(France) Circuit Paul Ricard	16 February	(Canada) Nelson Mason	(Canada) Nelson Mason	(Canada) Nelson Mason	(United Kingdom) Team West-Tec F3	(Italy) Matteo Davenia
NC	R2	(Spain) Circuito de Jerez	2 March	(United Arab Emirates) Ed Jones	(United Arab Emirates) Ed Jones	(United Arab Emirates) Ed Jones	(United Kingdom) Team West-Tec F3	(Spain) Igor Urien
1	R1	(France) Circuit Paul Ricard	27 April	(Canada) Nelson Mason	(Uruguay) Santiago Urrutia	(Canada) Nelson Mason	(United Kingdom) Team West-Tec F3	(United Kingdom) Cameron Twynham
1	R2	(France) Circuit Paul Ricard	28 April	(Canada) Nelson Mason	(Venezuela) Valeria Carballo	(Thailand) Sandy Stuvik	(Italy) RP Motorsport	(South Africa) Liam Venter
2	R1	(Portugal) Autódromo Internacional do Algarve	11 May	(Spain) Alexander Toril	(Thailand) Sandy Stuvik	(Uruguay) Santiago Urrutia	(Italy) RP Motorsport	(Slovakia) Richard Gonda
2	R2	(Portugal) Autódromo Internacional do Algarve	12 May	(United Kingdom) Hector Hurst	(Thailand) Sandy Stuvik	(United Arab Emirates) Ed Jones	(United Kingdom) Team West-Tec F3	(Slovakia) Richard Gonda
3	R1	(Germany) Nürburgring	1 June	(United Arab Emirates) Ed Jones	(United Arab Emirates) Ed Jones	(United Arab Emirates) Ed Jones	(United Kingdom) Team West-Tec F3	(Italy) Tommaso Menchini
3	R2	(Germany) Nürburgring	2 June	(United Kingdom) Hector Hurst	(Canada) Nelson Mason	(United Kingdom) Hector Hurst	(Spain) EmiliodeVillota Motorsport	(Slovakia) Richard Gonda
4	R1	(Spain) Circuito de Jerez	15 June	(Canada) Nelson Mason	(Canada) Nelson Mason	(Canada) Nelson Mason	(United Kingdom) Team West-Tec F3	(Slovakia) Richard Gonda
4	R2	(Spain) Circuito de Jerez	16 June	(United Arab Emirates) Ed Jones	(United Arab Emirates) Ed Jones	(Canada) Nelson Mason	(United Kingdom) Team West-Tec F3	(Italy) Tommaso Menchini
5	R1	(United Kingdom) Silverstone Circuit	13 July	(Thailand) Sandy Stuvik	(Thailand) Sandy Stuvik	(United Arab Emirates) Ed Jones	(United Kingdom) Team West-Tec F3	(South Korea) Che One Lim
5	R2	(United Kingdom) Silverstone Circuit	14 July	(Uruguay) Santiago Urrutia	(Uruguay) Santiago Urrutia	(Uruguay) Santiago Urrutia	(Italy) RP Motorsport	(Slovakia) Richard Gonda
6	R1	(Belgium) Circuit de Spa-Francorchamps	7 September	(Thailand) Sandy Stuvik	(United Arab Emirates) Ed Jones	(Thailand) Sandy Stuvik	(Italy) RP Motorsport	(United Kingdom) Cameron Twynham
6	R2	(Belgium) Circuit de Spa-Francorchamps	8 September	(Thailand) Sandy Stuvik	(Canada) Nelson Mason	(United Arab Emirates) Ed Jones	(United Kingdom) Team West-Tec F3	(Mexico) Gerardo Nieto
7	R1	(Italy) Autodromo Nazionale Monza	5 October	(Canada) Nelson Mason	(Uruguay) Santiago Urrutia	(United Arab Emirates) Ed Jones	(United Kingdom) Team West-Tec F3	(Spain) Igor Urien
7	R2	(Italy) Autodromo Nazionale Monza	6 October	(France) Alexandre Cougnaud	(France) Alexandre Cougnaud	(Thailand) Sandy Stuvik	(Italy) RP Motorsport	(Slovakia) Richard Gonda
8	R1	(Spain) Circuit de Catalunya	9 November	(United Arab Emirates) Ed Jones	(Canada) Nelson Mason	(United Arab Emirates) Ed Jones	(United Kingdom) Team West-Tec F3	(Italy) Tommaso Menchini
8	R2	(Spain) Circuit de Catalunya	10 November	(United Arab Emirates) Ed Jones	(Spain) Alexander Toril	(France) Alexandre Cougnaud	(Italy) RP Motorsport	(Slovakia) Richard Gonda

== Championship standings ==
=== Class A ===
- Points were awarded as follows:

1	2	3	4	5	6	7	8	9	10	PP	FL
25	18	15	12	10	8	6	4	2	1	**1**	1

Pos	Driver	LEC1 (France)	JER1 (Spain)	LEC2 (France)		ALG (Portugal)		NÜR (Germany)		JER2 (Spain)		SIL (United Kingdom)		SPA (Belgium)		MNZ (Italy)		CAT (Spain)		Pts
1	(United Arab Emirates) Ed Jones	3	**1**			4	1	**1**	6	2	**2**	1	3	2	1	1	18	**1**	**5**	256
2	(Thailand) Sandy Stuvik	4	5	4	1	2	3	2	3	5	4	**5**	2	**1**	**2**	4	1	5	2	247
3	(Canada) Nelson Mason	**1**	2	**1**	**Ret**	Ret	16	4	2	**1**	1	3	Ret	4	3	**2**	5	Ret	4	195
4	(Uruguay) Santiago Urrutia	18	Ret	24	Ret	1	2	6	5	3	5	2	**1**	3	Ret	5	Ret	2	3	191
5	(Spain) Alexander Toril	7	9	6	3	**3**	8	5	4	7	6	4	4	11	6	3	3	4	6	158
6	(France) Alexandre Cougnaud	Ret		7	7	8	5	9	9	4	3	Ret	16	8	4	7	**2**	3	1	139
7	(United Kingdom) Hector Hurst	2	Ret	2	22	10	**4**	3	**1**	6	8	7	Ret	7	Ret	Ret	20	10^{1}	10^{1}	97
8	(Israel) Yarin Stern		16	26	2	5	20	Ret	7	10	29	6	5	6	5	10	24	7	13	80
9	(Italy) Mario Marasca			9	12	7	6	7	Ret	9	7	Ret	9	Ret	11	6	4	9	8	62
10	(Italy) Vittoria Piria		4	23	4	11	9	8	12	12	9	8	8	12	10	26†	12	25†	9	33
11	(Russia) Alexey Chuklin	Ret	3	5	23	6	27	Ret	20	Ret	21	9	6	22	12	13	16	Ret	19	28
12	(Venezuela) Valeria Carballo	9	Ret	Ret	10	20	7	Ret	13	13	11	26	11	9	Ret	8	Ret	8	29†	20
13	(Poland) Artur Janosz	10	8	21	25	19	17	20	Ret	17	22	11	Ret	13	7	9	6	16	18	16
14	(Venezuela) Roberto La Rocca			3	11	Ret	11	12	11											15
15	(Guatemala) Andrés Saravia	6	6	12	24	16	Ret	10	8	8	10	15	12	Ret	15	NC	8	19	26	14
16	(United States) Spencer Pigot			25	5															10
17	(France) Brandon Maïsano													5	NC					10
18	(Slovakia) Richard Gonda	Ret	10	Ret	13	9	12	13	10	11	Ret	21	10	25	16	17	7	14	14	10
19	(Russia) Denis Nagulin	8	Ret	28	6	18	Ret	Ret	14	Ret	13	20	21	20	13	11	15	12	17	9
20	(United Kingdom) Emil Bernstorff											Ret	7							6
21	(Italy) Mattia Vita	Ret		8	28	13	10	19	18											5
22	(Mexico) Gerardo Nieto		13	15	17	22	18	21	Ret	24	17	14	14	21	8	27	22	DNS	Ret	4
23	(South Africa) Liam Venter	WD	17	14	8	15	28	17	Ret	DNS	20	Ret	22	Ret	17	16	21			4
24	(South Korea) Che One Lim	12	11	13	27	25	22	Ret	23	18	18	10	15	15	9	23	11	20	22	3
25	(Germany) Nicolas Pohler	16	Ret	18	9	28	25	15	25	21	15	13	Ret	NC	Ret	20	14	17	12	3
26	(Italy) Tommaso Menchini			16	18	27	13	11	15	Ret	12	16	Ret	17	14	22	10	11	15	3
27	(China) Huan Zhu			21	14	24	Ret	25	Ret	22	26	24	25	23	18	19	9	18	25	2
28	(Italy) Damiano Fioravanti		15	19	19	23	19	23	19	19	19	23	24	Ret	19	12	Ret	Ret	11	2
29	(Italy) Luca Orlandi	19	12	10	16	21	24	DNS	DNS	Ret	23	18	23							1
30	(United Kingdom) Jonathan Legris													10	NC					1
31	(United Kingdom) Cameron Twynham	11		11	26	12	21	14	16	14	16	12	13	14	Ret	21	19	15	16	0
32	(Spain) Igor Urien	13	7	17	15	14	15	16	17	16	14	Ret	20	19	Ret	14	Ret	13	20	0
33	(United Kingdom) Sean Walkinshaw	15	14	20	20	Ret	26	18	22	15	25	17	17	16	Ret	24	13	Ret	23	0
34	(Italy) Lorenzo Paggi	17	Ret	27	Ret	17	14	22	21	20	24	19	19							0
35	(Venezuela) Trino Rojas									Ret	27	22	18	24	Ret	18	17			0
36	(Saudi Arabia) Saud Al Faisal			Ret	21	26	23	24	24	23	28	25	Ret	18	Ret	25	23	23	28	0
Guest drivers ineligible to score points
	(Colombia) Tatiana Calderón																	6	7	0
	(Norway) Falco Wauer															15	Ret			0
	(Austria) Christopher Höher																	22	21	0
	(Italy) Costantino Peroni																	21	27	0
	(Colombia) William Barbosa																	24	24	0
Non-championship round-only drivers
	(Italy) Matteo Davenia	5																		0
	(France) Jordan Perroy	14																		0
Pos	Driver	LEC1 (France)	JER2 (Spain)	LEC2 (France)		ALG (Portugal)		NÜR (Germany)		JER2 (Spain)		SIL (United Kingdom)		SPA (Belgium)		MNZ (Italy)		CAT (Spain)		Pts

Colour	Result
Gold	Winner
Silver	Second place
Bronze	Third place
Green	Points classification
Blue	Non-points classification
Blue	Non-classified finish (NC)
Purple	Retired, not classified (Ret)
Red	Did not qualify (DNQ)
Red	Did not pre-qualify (DNPQ)
Black	Disqualified (DSQ)
White	Did not start (DNS)
White	Withdrew (WD)
White	Race cancelled (C)
Blank	Did not practice (DNP)
Blank	Did not arrive (DNA)
Blank	Excluded (EX)

**Bold** – Pole
Italics – Fastest Lap
^{1} – Ineligible for points

=== Copa F308/300 ===
- Points were awarded as follows:

1	2	3	4	5
10	8	6	4	3

Pos	Driver	LEC1 (France)	JER1 (Spain)	LEC2 (France)		ALG (Portugal)		NÜR (Germany)		JER2 (Spain)		SIL (United Kingdom)		SPA (Belgium)		MNZ (Italy)		CAT (Spain)		Pts
1	(Slovakia) Richard Gonda	Ret	10	Ret	13	9	12	13	10	11	Ret	21	10	25	16	17	7	14	14	100
2	(United Kingdom) Cameron Twynham	11		11	26	12	21	14	16	14	16	12	13	14	Ret	21	19	15	16	81
3	(Italy) Tommaso Menchini			16	18	27	13	11	15	Ret	12	16	Ret	17	14	22	10	11	15	78
4	(Spain) Igor Urien	13	7	17	15	14	15	16	17	16	14	Ret	20	19	Ret	14	Ret	13	20	54
5	(South Korea) Che One Lim	12	11	13	27	25	22	Ret	23	18	18	10	15	15	9	23	11	20	22	53
6	(South Africa) Liam Venter	WD	17	14	8	15	28	17	Ret	DNS	20	Ret	22	Ret	17	16	21			31
7	(Mexico) Gerardo Nieto		13	15	17	22	18	21	Ret	24	17	14	14	21	8	27	22	DNS	Ret	30
8	(Germany) Nicolas Pohler	16	Ret	18	9	28	25	15	25	21	15	13	Ret	NC	Ret					24
9	(United Kingdom) Sean Walkinshaw	15	14	20	20	Ret	26	18	22	15	25	17	17	16	Ret	24	13	Ret	23	19
10	(Italy) Lorenzo Paggi	17	Ret	27	Ret	17	14	22	21	20	24	19	19							9
11	(Venezuela) Trino Rojas									Ret	27	22	18	24	Ret	18	17			7
12	(China) Huan Zhu			21	14	24	Ret	25	Ret	22	26	24	25	23	18					4
13	(Saudi Arabia) Saud Al Faisal			Ret	21	26	23	24	24	23	28	25	Ret	18	Ret	25	23	23	28	3
14	(Italy) Damiano Fioravanti		15	19	19	23	19	23	19	19	19	23	24	Ret	19					3
15	(Austria) Christopher Höher																	22	21	0
16	(Italy) Costantino Peroni																	21	27	0
17	(Colombia) William Barbosa																	24	24	0
Non-championship round-only drivers
	(Italy) Matteo Davenia	5																		0
	(Spain) Alexander Toril	7	9																	0
	(Italy) Mattia Vita	Ret																		0
Pos	Driver	LEC1 (France)	JER1 (Spain)	LEC2 (France)		ALG (Portugal)		NÜR (Germany)		JER2 (Spain)		SIL (United Kingdom)		SPA (Belgium)		MNZ (Italy)		CAT (Spain)		Pts

=== Teams' standings ===
- Points were awarded as follows:

1	2	3	4	5
10	8	6	4	3

Pos	Driver	LEC1 (France)	JER1 (Spain)	LEC2 (France)		ALG (Portugal)		NÜR (Germany)		JER2 (Spain)		SIL (United Kingdom)		SPA (Belgium)		MNZ (Italy)		CAT (Spain)		Pts
1	(Italy) RP Motorsport	4	4	4	1	1	2	2	3	3	3	2	1	1	2	3	1	2	1	128
2	(United Kingdom) Team West-Tec F3	1	1	1	5	4	1	1	2	1	1	1	3	2	1	1	5	1	4	126
3	(Spain) EmiliodeVillota Motorsport	2	3	2	2	5	4	3	1	6	8	6	5	6	5	10	8	6	7	45
4	(Italy) BVM Racing			9	4	7	6	7	12	9	7	8	9	12	10	6	4	9	8	8
5	(Italy) DAV Racing													5	NC	20	14	17	12	3
Pos	Driver	LEC (France)	JER (Spain)	LEC (France)		ALG (Portugal)		NÜR (Germany)		JER (Spain)		SIL (United Kingdom)		SPA (Belgium)		MNZ (Italy)		CAT (Spain)		Pts
