= DAV Racing =

(Italy) DAV Racing
- Founded: 2012
- Team principal(s): Matteo Davenia
- Former series: European F3 Open Championship; Italian F4 Championship
- Drivers' Championships: European F3 Open: 2012: Kevin Giovesi (Copa class)

DAV Racing is an auto racing team based in Italy. Founded in 2012 by former RP Motorsport driver Matteo Davenia, the team began competing in European F3 Open Championships Copa class in 2012, which was won by DAV Racing's Kevin Giovesi. The team began competing in the main championship in 2014 before stepping out of Euroformula Open Championship after the 2016 season.

== Former series results ==
=== European F3 Open/Euroformula Open ===
European F3 Open Championship
Year	Car	Drivers	Races	Wins	Poles	F/Laps	Points	D.C.	T.C.
2012	Dallara F308-Toyota	(Italy) Kevin Giovesi [C]	14	11	0	0	110	1st [C]	5th
2012	Dallara F308-Toyota	(Italy) Matteo Davenia [C]	16	0	0	0	46	6th [C]	5th
2013	Dallara F312-Toyota	(France) Brandon Maïsano	2	0	0	0	10	17th	5th
2013	Dallara F308-Toyota	(Germany) Nicolas Pohler	16	0	0	0	3	25th	5th
2013	Dallara F308-Toyota	(Mexico) Gerardo Nieto [C]	15	1	0	0	30	5th [C]	5th
Euroformula Open Championship
2014	Dallara F312-Toyota	(Italy) Leonardo Pulcini	2	0	0	0	14	19th	6th
2014	Dallara F312-Toyota	(Italy) Kevin Giovesi	2	0	0	1	0	NC‡	6th
2014	Dallara F312-Toyota	(Brazil) Henrique Baptista	16	0	0	0	11	20th	6th
2014	Dallara F312-Toyota	(Italy) Tommaso Menchini	2	0	0	0	0	25th	6th
2014	Dallara F312-Toyota	(Mexico) Gerardo Nieto	6	0	0	0	26	15th	6th
2014	Dallara F312-Toyota	(Italy) Costantino Peroni	4	0	0	0	2	23rd†	6th
2014	Dallara F312-Toyota	(Spain) Igor Urien	2	0	0	0	2	22nd†	6th
2015	Dallara F312-Toyota	(Italy) Alessio Rovera	6	1	0	0	100	6th†	5th
2015	Dallara F312-Toyota	(China) Kang Ling	4	0	0	0	0	NC‡	5th
2015	Dallara F312-Toyota	(India) Parth Ghorpade	6	0	0	0	2	18th	5th
2015	Dallara F312-Toyota	(Italy) Leonardo Pulcini	15	1	0	0	91	9th	5th
2016	Dallara F312-Toyota	(Italy) Daniele Cazzaniga	8	0	0	0	1	23rd	6th
2016	Dallara F312-Toyota	(Italy) Riccardo Cazzaniga	6	0	0	0	1	22nd	6th
2016	Dallara F312-Toyota	(China) Kang Ling	6	0	0	0	0	24th	6th
2016	Dallara F312-Toyota	(United Kingdom) Enaam Ahmed	2	0	0	0	6	11th†	6th

† Shared results with other teams ‡ Guest driver – ineligible for points.

=== Italian F4 Championship ===
Year	Car	Drivers	Races	Wins	Poles	F/Laps	Points	D.C.	T.C.
2014	Tatuus F4-T014	(Italy) Leonardo Pulcini	21	0	0	0	187†	4th†	9th
2014	Tatuus F4-T014	(Brazil) Gustavo Bandeira	12	0	0	0	24	18th	9th

† Shared results with other teams

== Timeline ==
Former series
Euroformula Open Championship	2012–2016
Italian F4 Championship	2014
