= Nelson Mason =

Canadian racing driver

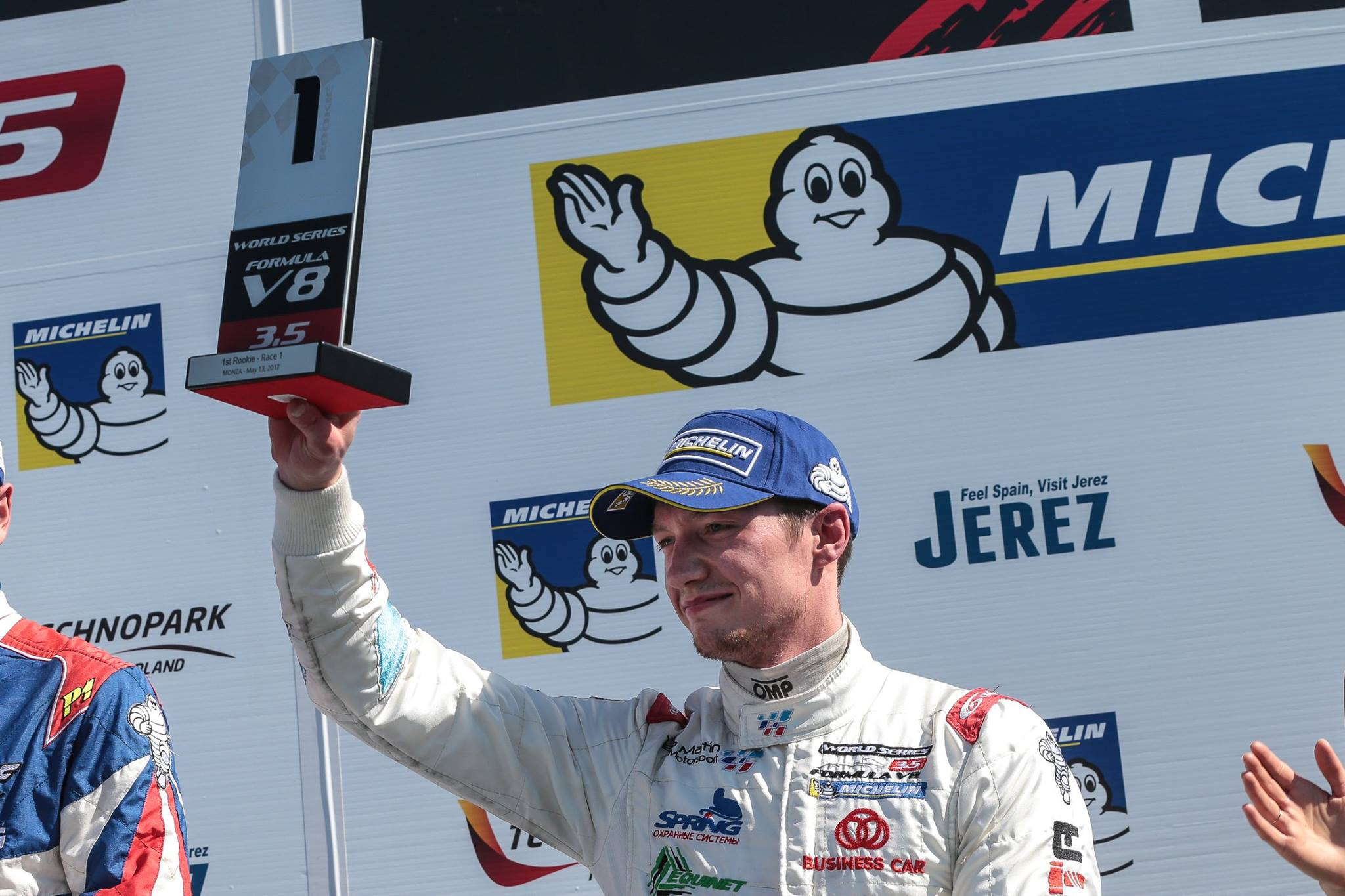
- Nelson Mason
- Nationality: (Canada) Canadian
- Born: 13 October 1987 (age 39) Niagara Falls, Ontario, Canada
- Relatives: Jesse Mason (brother)

World Series Formula V8 3.5 career
- Debut season: 2017
- Current team: Teo Martín Motorsport
- Car number: 10
- Starts: 9
- Wins: 0
- Poles: 0
- Fastest laps: 1
- Best finish: 11th in 2017

Previous series
- 2014 2013 2010: GP3 Series; European F3 Open; Italian Formula Three

Championship titles
- 2013: European F3 Open Winter Series

Nelson Mason (born 13 October 1987) is a Canadian racing driver currently racing in the World Series Formula V8 3.5 for Teo Martín Motorsport. He is one of only a handful of Canadian racing drivers who made the step into the European motorsport scene with some success. He added the 2013 European F3 Open Winter Series Championship to his crown and made the move up into World Series this year.

== Career ==
=== Early career ===
Born in Niagara Falls, Ontario, Mason came from a family rooted in motorsport. His father and grandfather designed and built the RTJ Formula Vee that his father raced to many championships in North America in the 1980s and 1990s in the SCCA and in the Canadian Automobile Sport Clubs ASN Canada FIA. His brother, Jesse Mason was also a successful racing driver, competing Internationally and finishing third in the Indy Lights championship in 2004.

Mason began racing in motocross in 1992, when he was four years old. At the time he was too young to race in karting in North America, so Motocross in Canada in the CMRC was the only option. By the time Mason hit his eighth birthday in 1995, he had won the Ontario Provincial Motocross Championship and the Canadian National Motocross Championship. He did double duty in 1996, racing in both the CMRC and starting his first year in karting in the United States. That year, he added another Provincial Championship to his Motocross resume, and went on to take the New York State Karting Championship, forcing him to miss the Canadian Nationals in ’96. That led to focusing on four wheels from then on. In 1997, he began racing in the World Karting Association. Mason took a multitude of wins as he progressed through the karting classes, including international wins in the 1999 Constructor's Cup. In 2002, he moved up to the SKUSA ProMoto Tour in the 80cc Shifterkart class with the MBA karts team. In 2003, Mason was picked up by the First Kart North America team. He shifted his focus to the Champ Car Stars of Tomorrow Karting Championship. He also did some appearances in SKUSA that year, scoring Pole Positions in Jacksonville and Texas. Mason won in the Champ Car series first time out, and went on to the Champ Car World Finals in California to qualify pole and win the Pre-Final, before finishing third in the Final and taking third in the overall Championship.

Later, Mason competed in the British Universities Karting Championship from 2006 to 2008. He scored a multitude of victories for his Oxford Brookes University Kart team, and finished third, second, third, in the Championship respectively.

=== Early car career ===
Mason made his open-wheel racing debut, competing in his father's Formula Vee in the SCCA in 2004. Due to budget limitations he was only able to run several rounds, but scored a podium at Pocono Raceway. In 2005, Mason got a late chance to race in the Walter Hayes Trophy Race in a Spirit Formula Ford. His first foray in European racing and in Formula Ford, Mason excelled around the Silverstone Circuit, in a car prepared just by him and his brother. In a field of over 150 cars, Mason battled his way through the rainy conditions to make the final, and go from 18th to third within the first three laps. After a race long battle for third position, Mason slid off the road into the gravel with two laps remaining.

In 2006, Mason headed back to North America, racing again in Formula Vee in the SCCA. He scored wins, podiums, and lap records on way to finishing third in the championship at the 2006 SCCA Runoffs. His European racing continued, competing in the Formula Ford Festival in 2007 and 2008. His best result was 21st in 2007 after looking set for a top-ten finish, setting fastest lap, but was taken out of fourth place in the semi-final race, forcing him to race his way into the final through the Last Chance race. He also spent six races in 2010 Italian Formula Three season with Team Ghinzani.

=== European F3 Open ===
After three-year absence, Mason moved to European F3 Open Championship with Team West-Tec in 2013. He had wins at Le Castellet and Jerez with another three podiums on his way to the third in the series standings.

=== GP3 Series ===
In 2014, Mason graduated to the GP3 Series with Hilmer Motorsport.

== Racing record ==
=== Career summary ===
Season	Series	Team	Races	Wins	Poles	F/Laps	Podiums	Points	Position
2007	Formula Ford Festival		1	0	0	0	0	N/A	21st
2008	Formula Ford Festival		1	0	0	0	0	N/A	NC
2010	Italian Formula 3 Championship	Team Ghinzani	6	0	0	0	0	0	29th
2013	European F3 Open Championship	Team West-Tec	16	3	4	4	6	195	**3rd**
2013	Macau Grand Prix	Jo Zeller Racing	1	0	0	0	0	N/A	17th
2014	GP3 Series	Hilmer Motorsport	17	0	0	0	0	0	22nd
2014	Euroformula Open Championship	EmiliodeVillota Motorsport	2	0	0	0	1	0	NC
2017	World Series Formula V8 3.5	Teo Martín Motorsport	9	0	0	1	0	42	11th
2018	Porsche GT3 Cup Challenge Canada	Policaro Motorsport	2	0	0	0	1	55	16th

=== Complete GP3 Series results ===
(key) (Races in bold indicate pole position) (Races in italics indicate fastest lap)

Year	Entrant	1	2	3	4	5	6	7	8	9	10	11	12	13	14	15	16	17	18	Pos	Points
2014	Hilmer Motorsport	CAT; FEA; 17	CAT; SPR; Ret	RBR; FEA; 14	RBR; SPR; 16	SIL; FEA; 25	SIL; SPR; 12	HOC; FEA; 16	HOC; SPR; 14	HUN; FEA; 19	HUN; SPR; 20	SPA; FEA; 15	SPA; SPR; 10	MNZ; FEA; Ret	MNZ; SPR; 18	SOC; FEA; 15	SOC; SPR; DNS	YMC; FEA; 17	YMC; SPR; 18†	22nd	0

^{†} Driver did not finish the race, but was classified as he completed over 90% of the race distance.

=== Complete World Series Formula V8 3.5 results ===
(key) (Races in bold indicate pole position; races in italics indicate fastest lap)

Year	Team	1	2	3	4	5	6	7	8	9	10	11	12	13	14	15	16	17	18	Pos	Points
2017	Teo Martín Motorsport	SIL; 1; 7	SIL; 2 Ret	SPA; 1; 9	SPA; 2; 9	MNZ; 1; 6	MNZ; 2; 6	JER; 1; 5	JER; 2; 8	ALC; 1 DNP	ALC; 2; 9	NÜR; 1	NÜR; 2	MEX; 1	MEX; 2	COA; 1	COA; 2	BHR; 1	BHR; 2	11th	42
