= Brandon Maïsano =

French racing driver

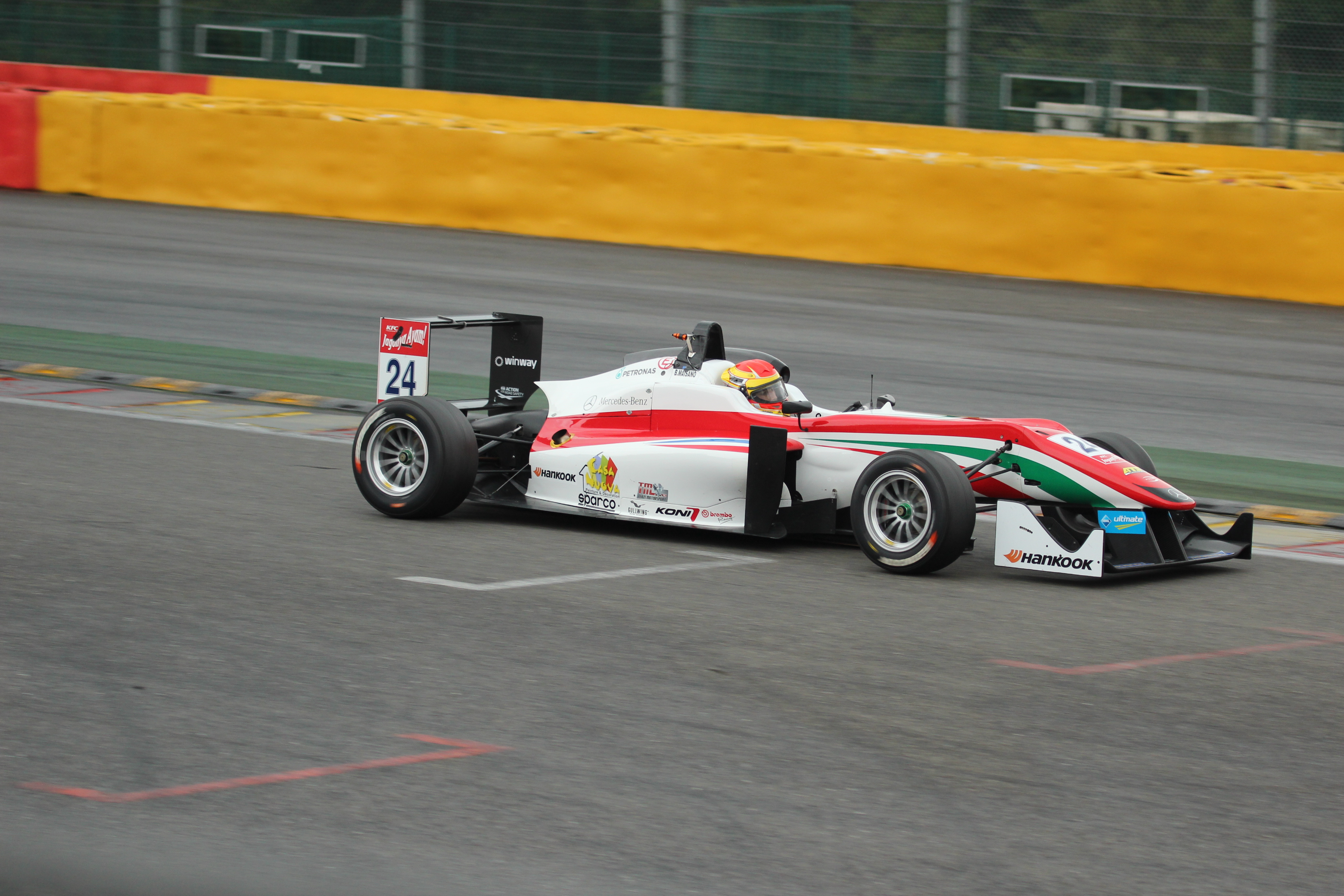
- Nationality: (France) French
- Born: Brandon Bruno Raymond Maïsano; 24 June 1993 (age 33) Cannes, France

FIA Formula 3 European Championship
- Categorisation: FIA Silver
- Years active: 2015
- Teams: Prema Powerteam
- Starts: 22
- Wins: 0
- Poles: 0
- Fastest laps: 0
- Best finish: 15th in 2015

Previous series
- 2010 2011–12 2013 2014 2015 2015: Formula Abarth; Formula 3 Italy; European F3 Open; Formula 4 Italy – Trophy Series; Toyota Racing Series; GP3 Series

Championship titles
- 2010 2014: Formula Abarth; Formula 4 Italy – Trophy Series

Brandon Bruno Raymond Maïsano (born 24 June 1993 in Cannes) is a French former racing driver. He has competed in various third-tier open wheel championships, most notably the GP3 Series and FIA Formula 3 European Championship. He is also a former champion of Formula Abarth and the Italian F4 Trophy, and a former member of the Ferrari Driver Academy.

== Racing record ==
=== Career summary ===
Season	Series	Team	Races	Wins	Poles	F/Laps	Podiums	Points	Position
2010	Formula Abarth	BVM Racing	14	4	2	4	7	128	**1st**
2011	Italian Formula 3 Championship	BVM–Target Racing	16	2	1	2	6	118	4th
2012	Italian Formula 3 Championship	Prema Powerteam	24	3	2	3	14	229	**3rd**
2013	European F3 Open Championship	DAV Racing	2	0	0	0	0	10	17th
2014	Italian F4 Trophy	Prema Powerteam	21	17	8	7	19	426	**1st**
2015	Toyota Racing Series	M2 Competition	15	5	4	5	8	798	**2nd**
2015	FIA Formula 3 European Championship	Prema Powerteam	22	0	0	0	0	53	15th
2015	GP3 Series	Campos Racing	2	0	0	0	0	0	25th

=== Complete Formula Abarth results ===
(key) (Races in bold indicate pole position) (Races in italics indicate fastest lap)

Year	Entrant	Class	1	2	3	4	NC	NC	5	6	7	8	9	10	11	12	13	14	DC	Points
2010	BVM – Target Racing	Championship	MIS; 1; 16	MIS; 2; 11	**MGI**; **1**; 1	MGI; 2; 2	SPA; 1; 4	SPA; 2 Ret	IMO; 1; 2	IMO; 2; 1	VAR; 1; 8	VAR; 2; 2	VLL; 1; 5	VLL; 2; 1	MUG; 1; 10	MUG; 2; 10	**MNZ**; **1**; 4	MNZ; 2; 1	1st	128

=== Complete Italian Formula Three Championship results ===
(key) (Races in bold indicate pole position) (Races in italics indicate fastest lap)

Year	Entrant	1	2	3	4	5	6	7	8	9	10	11	12	13	14	15	16	17	18	19	20	21	22	23	24	DC	Points
2011	BVM – Target Racing	FRA; 1; 11	FRA; 2; 1	MIS; 1; 8	MIS; 2; 8	IMO; 1; 4	IMO; 2; 2	SPA; 1; 7	SPA; 2; 3	**ADR**; **1**; 2	ADR; 2; 4	VLL; 1; 6	VLL; 2; 1	MUG; 1; 9	MUG; 2; 9	MZA; 1; 5	MZA; 2; 3									4th	116
2012	Prema Powerteam	VAL; 1; 3	VAL; 2; 2	VAL; 3; 4	HUN; 1 Ret	HUN; 2; 3	HUN; 3; 5	MUG; 1; 2	MUG; 2; 1	MUG; 3; 10	**MIS**; **1**; 1	**MIS**; **2**; 1	MIS; 3; 3	RBR; 1; 3	RBR; 2; 2	RBR; 3; 2	IMO; 1; 8	IMO; 2; 3	IMO; 3; 10	VLL; 1; 2	VLL; 2; 2	VLL; 3 Ret	MNZ; 1; 7	MNZ; 2 DSQ	MNZ; 3 DSQ	3rd	229

=== Complete European F3 Open Championship results ===
(key) (Races in bold indicate pole position) (Races in italics indicate fastest lap)

Year	Entrant	Class	1	2	3	4	5	6	7	8	9	10	11	12	13	14	15	16	DC	Points
2013	DAV Racing	A	LEC; 1	LEC; 2	ALG; 1	ALG; 2	NÜR; 1	NÜR; 2	JER; 1	JER; 2	SIL; 1	SIL; 2	SPA; 1; 5	SPA; 2 NC	MNZ; 1	MNZ; 2	CAT; 1	CAT; 2	17th	10

=== Complete Italian F4 Championship results ===
(key) (Races in bold indicate pole position) (Races in italics indicate fastest lap)

Year	Entrant	Class	1	2	3	4	5	6	7	8	9	10	11	12	13	14	15	16	17	18	19	20	21	DC	Points
2014	Prema Powerteam	Trophy	ADR; 1; 2	ADR; 2; 5	ADR; 3; 3	IMO; 1; 2	IMO; 2; 3	IMO; 3; 2	**MUG**; **1**; 1	MUG; 2; 3	**MUG**; **3**; 1	MGI; 1; 2	MGI; 2 Ret	**MGI**; **3**; 1	**VLL**; **1**; 1	VLL; 2; 4	**VLL**; **3**; 2	MNZ; 1; 3	MNZ; 2 Ret	**MNZ**; **3**; 2	**IMO**; **1**; 1	IMO; 2; 3	**IMO**; **3**; 1	1st	406

=== Complete Toyota Racing Series results ===
(key) (Races in bold indicate pole position) (Races in italics indicate fastest lap)

Year	Entrant	1	2	3	4	5	6	7	8	9	10	11	12	13	14	15	16	DC	Points
2015	M2 Competition	**RUA**; **1**; 5	RUA; 2; 1	RUA; 3 Ret	TER; 1; 12	TER; 2; 11	TER; 3; 6	HMP; 1; 2	HMP; 2; 1	**HMP**; **3**; 3	TAU; 1; 6	TAU; 2; 1	**TAU**; **3**; 1	TAU; 4 Ret	**MAN**; **1**; 1	MAN; 2; 8	MAN; 3; 3	2nd	798

=== Complete FIA Formula 3 European Championship results ===
(key) (Races in bold indicate pole position) (Races in italics indicate fastest lap)

Year	Entrant	Engine	1	2	3	4	5	6	7	8	9	10	11	12	13	14	15	16	17	18	19	20	21	22	23	24	25	26	27	28	29	30	31	32	33	DC	Points
2015	Prema Powerteam	Mercedes-Benz	SIL; 1 Ret	SIL; 2; 5	SIL; 3; 8	HOC; 1; 8	HOC; 2; 10	HOC; 3; 17	PAU; 1; 10	PAU; 2 Ret	PAU; 3; 21	MNZ; 1; 9	MNZ; 2; 7	MNZ; 3; 5	SPA; 1; 15	SPA; 2; 4	SPA; 3; 6	NOR; 1; 20	NOR; 2; 10	NOR; 3; 10	ZAN; 1; 10	ZAN; 2; 13	ZAN; 3; 29	RBR; 1; 26	RBR; 2 WD	RBR; 3 WD	ALG; 1	ALG; 2	ALG; 3	NÜR; 1	NÜR; 2	NÜR; 3	HOC; 1	HOC; 2	HOC; 3	15th	53

=== Complete GP3 Series results ===
(key) (Races in bold indicate pole position) (Races in italics indicate fastest lap)

Year	Entrant	1	2	3	4	5	6	7	8	9	10	11	12	13	14	15	16	17	18	DC	Points
2015	Campos Racing	CAT; FEA	CAT; SPR	RBR; FEA	RBR; SPR	SIL; FEA	SIL; SPR	HUN; FEA	HUN; SPR	SPA; FEA	SPA; SPR	MNZ; FEA; 12	MNZ; SPR; 13	SOC; FEA	SOC; SPR	BHR; FEA	BHR; SPR	YMC; FEA	YMC; SPR	25th	0
