= Kevin Giovesi =

Italian racing driver (born 1993)

- Nationality: (Italy) Italian
- Born: 8 November 1993 (age 33) Rho (Italy)

GP2 Series career
- Debut season: 2013
- Former teams: Venezuela GP Lazarus, Rapax
- Starts: 4
- Wins: 0
- Poles: 0
- Fastest laps: 0
- Best finish: 29th in 2013

Previous series
- 2013-14 2012 2010–12 2009: Auto GP; European F3 Open; Italian F3; Formula Lista Junior

Championship titles
- 2012 2009: European F3 Open Copa Class; Formula Lista Junior

Kevin Giovesi (born 8 November 1993) is an Italian former racing driver. He is the 2012 European F3 Open Copa Class champion.

== Career ==
=== Karting ===
Born in Rho, Giovesi began karting in 2005 and raced primarily in his native Italy for the majority of his karting career, working his way up from the junior ranks to progress through to the KF3 category by 2008.

=== Formula Lista Junior ===
In 2009, Giovesi graduated to single–seaters into the Formula Lista Junior series, competing with Daltec Racing. He won races at Nürburgring, Magny-Cours and Hockenheimring with four another podium finishes on his way to the championship title.

=== Italian Formula Three ===
Giovesi stepped up to Italian Formula Three Championship, joining BVM – Target Racing, but after the first round he switched to JD Motorsport. He finished half of the seasons races in the points. This brought him fifteenth place in the championship.

Giovesi remained in the Italian championship in 2011 but moved to Lucidi Motors team. He progressed to the seventh place in the championship standings.

After skipping the first three rounds in 2012, Giovesi returned in the championship, participating with Ghinzani Arco Motorsport. He finished sixth in the European Series and fourth in the Italian Series.

=== European F3 Open ===
In 2012, Giovesi decided to race in Copa Class of the European F3 Open Championship for the Dallara F308 cars with DAV Racing. He finished sixth in the main class and won the Copa Class.

=== Formula Renault ===
Giovesi had single appearances in Eurocup Formula Renault 2.0 and in Formula Renault Northern European Cup 2012 with EPIC Racing and Daltec Racing.

=== GP2 Series ===
Giovesi made his GP2 Series switch in 2013, joining Venezuela GP Lazarus.

== Racing record ==
=== Career summary ===
Season	Series	Team	Races	Wins	Poles	F/Laps	Podiums	Points	Position
2009	Formula Lista Junior	Daltec Racing	12	5	6	2	9	184	**1st**
2010	Italian Formula Three	BVM – Target Racing	16	0	0	0	0	18	15th
2010	Italian Formula Three	JD Motorsport	16	0	0	0	0	18	15th
2011	Italian Formula Three	Lucidi Motors	16	2	0	1	3	184	7th
2012	European F3 Open	DAV Racing	14	0	0	0	1	93	6th
2012	European F3 Open – Copa Class	DAV Racing	14	11	12	7	11	110	**1st**
2012	Italian Formula Three European Series	Ghinzani Arco Motorsport	14	3	0	0	5	121	6th
2012	Italian Formula Three Italian Series	Ghinzani Arco Motorsport	14	3	0	0	5	124	4th
2012	Formula Renault 2.0 Northern European Cup	Daltec Racing	3	0	0	0	0	14	40th
2012	Eurocup Formula Renault 2.0	EPIC Racing	2	0	0	0	0	0	41st
2013	Auto GP	Ghinzani Motorsport	10	0	0	0	5	91	6th
2013	GP2 Series	Venezuela GP Lazarus	8	0	0	0	0	0	29th
2014	Auto GP	Eurotech Engineering	14	2	2	0	5	155	5th
2014	Auto GP	FMS Racing	14	2	2	0	5	155	5th
2014	GP2 Series	Rapax	2	0	0	0	0	0	33rd
2014	Euroformula Open Championship	DAV Racing	2	0	0	1	0	0	NC
2015	Porsche Carrera Cup Italia	Ghinzani Arco Motorsport	2	0	0	0	1	12	19th
2016	Porsche Carrera Cup Italia	Ghinzani Arco Motorsport	8	0	0	0	2	58	13th

=== Complete Eurocup Formula Renault 2.0 results ===
(key) (Races in bold indicate pole position; races in italics indicate fastest lap)

Year	Entrant	1	2	3	4	5	6	7	8	9	10	11	12	13	14	DC	Points
2012	EPIC Racing	ALC; 1; 20	ALC; 2; 18	SPA; 1	SPA; 2	NÜR; 1	NÜR; 2	MSC; 1	MSC; 2	HUN; 1	HUN; 2	LEC; 1	LEC; 2	CAT; 1	CAT; 2	41st	0

=== Complete Formula Renault 2.0 NEC results ===
(key) (Races in bold indicate pole position) (Races in italics indicate fastest lap)

Year	Entrant	1	2	3	4	5	6	7	8	9	10	11	12	13	14	15	16	17	18	19	20	DC	Points
2012	Daltec Racing	HOC; 1; 20	HOC; 2; 7	HOC; 3 Ret	NÜR; 1	NÜR; 2	OSC; 1	OSC; 2	OSC; 3	ASS; 1	ASS; 2	RBR; 1	RBR; 2	MST; 1	MST; 2	MST; 3	ZAN; 1	ZAN; 2	ZAN; 3	SPA; 1	SPA; 2	40th	14

=== Complete GP2 Series results ===
(key) (Races in bold indicate pole position) (Races in italics indicate fastest lap)

Year	Entrant	1	2	3	4	5	6	7	8	9	10	11	12	13	14	15	16	17	18	19	20	21	22	DC	Points
2013	Venezuela GP Lazarus	SEP; FEA; 16	SEP; SPR; 10	BHR; FEA; Ret	BHR; SPR; 17	CAT; FEA; Ret	CAT; SPR; 17	MON; FEA; Ret	MON; SPR; 20	SIL; FEA	SIL; SPR	HOC; FEA	HOC; SPR	HUN; FEA	HUN; SPR	SPA; FEA	SPA; SPR	MNZ; FEA	MNZ; SPR	MRN; FEA	MRN; SPR	YMC; FEA	YMC; SPR	29th	0
2014	Rapax	BHR; FEA	BHR; SPR	CAT; FEA	CAT; SPR	MON; FEA	MON; SPR	RBR; FEA	RBR; SPR	SIL; FEA	SIL; SPR	HOC; FEA	HOC; SPR	HUN; FEA	HUN; SPR	SPA; FEA	SPA; SPR	MNZ; FEA	MNZ; SPR	SOC; FEA	SOC; SPR	YMC; FEA; 19	YMC; SPR; 20	33rd	0

=== Complete Auto GP results ===
(key) (Races in bold indicate pole position) (Races in italics indicate fastest lap)

Year	Entrant	1	2	3	4	5	6	7	8	9	10	11	12	13	14	15	16	Pos	Points
2013	Ghinzani Motorsport	MNZ; 1	MNZ; 2	MAR; 1	MAR; 2	HUN; 1	HUN; 2	SIL; 1; 13	SIL; 2; 3	MUG; 1; 2	MUG; 2; 5	NÜR; 1; 2	NÜR; 2; 10	DON; 1; 3	DON; 2; 3	BRN; 2 Ret	BRN; 2; 6	6th	91
2014	Eurotech Engineering	**MAR**; **1** Ret	MAR; 2 Ret	**LEC**; **1**; 4	LEC; 2; 1	HUN; 1; 4	HUN; 2; 4	MNZ; 1; 8	MNZ; 2; 1									5th	155
2014	FMS Racing									IMO; 1; 2	IMO; 2; 2	RBR; 1; 4	RBR; 2; 7†	NÜR; 1; 2	NÜR; 2; 6	EST; 1 WD	EST; 2 WD	5th	155

† Driver did not finish the race, but was classified as he completed over 90% of the race distance.

Sporting positions
Preceded by Joël Volluz	Formula Lista Junior; Champion; 2009	Succeeded by Michael Lamotte
Preceded by Fabio Gamberini	European F3 Open; Copa Champion; 2012	Succeeded by Richard Gonda
