= Måns Grenhagen =

Swedish racing driver

Måns Simon Willhelm Grenhagen (born 20 July 1993 in Stockholm) is a Swedish racing driver. In 2013, he started in the FIA Formula 3 European Championship, competing for Dutch racing team Van Amersfoort Racing.

== Career ==
Grenhagen began his racing career in karting 2006. He remained in karting until 2009. In 2007, he won the Swedish ICA Junior Championship. In 2008, he won the Swedish KF3 Championship. In 2009, he began his formula racing career. He started in the Formula Lista junior. He concluded the season on the eighth position with a second place as his best result. In 2010, Grenhagen got a cockpit at Jenzer Motorsport in the Formula Abarth. He participated in the first four rounds of the championship. Two fourth places were his best results. He ended on the 15th place in the standings. Moreover, he took part in two races of the Swedish Formula Renault.

After a year without motorsport, Grenhagen raced again in 2012. He started for EmiliodeVillota Motorsport in the European F3 Open Championship. He won a race in the Winter Series, which was before the opening of the regular season. Grenhagen won four races in the regular championship. He finished nine times on the podium. As the best driver of his team, he concluded the season on the third place of the championship. In 2013, Grenhagen switched to the FIA European Formula Three Championship. He started the season for Van Amersfoort Racing, but was replaced by Sven Müller before the end of the season.

== Career summary ==
- 2006–2009: Karting
- 2009: Formula Lista Junior (eighth position)
- 2010: Formula Abarth (15th position)
- 2010: Swedish Formula Renault
- 2012: European F3 Open Championship, Winter Series
- 2012: European F3 Open Championship (third place)
- 2013: FIA Formula 3 European Championship
