= 2010 Italian Formula Three Championship =

Seasons
- ← 2009 2011 →

The 2010 Italian Formula Three Championship was the 46th Italian Formula Three Championship season. The season began on 24 April at Misano and ended on 24 October at Monza after 16 races held at eight meetings.

With victories at Hockenheim, Vallelunga and Monza, César Ramos of BVM – Target Racing finished the season as champion, becoming only the fifth non-Italian driver to win the title. He finished eight points clear of Lucidi Motors driver Stéphane Richelmi, who won four races during the season. Third place went to Prema Junior's Andrea Caldarelli, who took two victories at Mugello as well as the season-opening round at Misano. Ramos, Richelmi and Caldarelli each earned a Formula One test with Scuderia Ferrari, as well as a test in a Formula Renault 3.5 Series car. Fourth place in the championship was claimed by Team Ghinzani's Daniel Mancinelli who won races at Hockenheim and Imola, while fifth went to triple race-winner Sergio Campana, the team-mate of Richelmi. Jesse Krohn took the other race victory at Varano for RP Motorsport.

== Teams and drivers ==
- All cars were powered by FPT engines, and ran on Kumho tyres. All teams were Italian-registered.

Team	No	Driver	Chassis	Status	Rounds
BVM – Target Racing	1	(Canada) Tyler Dueck	Dallara F310	R	2–3, 8
BVM – Target Racing	1	(Italy) Edolo Ghirelli	Dallara F310	R	6
BVM – Target Racing	1	(Italy) Vittorio Ghirelli	Dallara F310	R	7
BVM – Target Racing	2	(Italy) Kevin Giovesi	Dallara F310	R	1
BVM – Target Racing	2	(Italy) Federico Scionti	Dallara F310	R	2
BVM – Target Racing	2	(United States) Barrett Mertins	Dallara F310	R	5–8
BVM – Target Racing	3	(Brazil) César Ramos	Dallara F310		All
Prema Junior	4	(Italy) Samuele Buttarelli	Dallara F310		1–5
Prema Junior	4	(France) Nicolas Marroc	Dallara F310		6–8
Prema Junior	5	(Italy) Edoardo Liberati	Dallara F310		All
Prema Junior	27	(Italy) Andrea Caldarelli	Dallara F310		All
RC Motorsport	6	(Italy) Andrea Roda	Dallara F310	R	All
RC Motorsport	7	(Italy) Francesco Castellacci	Dallara F310		1–3
RC Motorsport	7	(Italy) Pasquale Di Sabatino	Dallara F310		4
RC Motorsport	7	(United States) Matt Lee	Dallara F310		5–8
RC Motorsport	35	(Belgium) Frédéric Vervisch	Dallara F310		1–4
RC Motorsport	35	(Italy) Francesco Castellacci	Dallara F310		6–8
Team Ghinzani	8	(Italy) Daniel Mancinelli	Dallara F310		All
Team Ghinzani	9	(Italy) Vittorio Ghirelli	Dallara F310	R	1
Team Ghinzani	9	(Canada) Nelson Mason	Dallara F310	R	2–4
Team Ghinzani	9	(Italy) Leonardo Osmieri	Dallara F310	R	5
Team Ghinzani	9	(Italy) Samuele Buttarelli	Dallara F310		6–8
Corbetta Competizioni	10	(Switzerland) Alex Fontana	Dallara F310	R	All
Corbetta Competizioni	38	(United Kingdom) Dino Zamparelli	Dallara F310	R	1
Lucidi Motors	11	(Monaco) Stéphane Richelmi	Dallara F310		All
Lucidi Motors	15	(Italy) Sergio Campana	Dallara F310		All
Lucidi Motors	50	(Canada) Gianmarco Raimondo	Dallara F310		All
JD Motorsport	12	(Italy) Kevin Giovesi	Mygale M-10	R	2–8
JD Motorsport	16	(Switzerland) Christopher Zanella	Mygale M-10		All
EuroInternational	17	(United States) Gabriel Chaves	Mygale M-10	R	All
EuroInternational	36	(Italy) Vittorio Ghirelli	Mygale M-10	R	2–3, 6
EuroInternational	36	(France) Tom Dillmann	Mygale M-10		7–8
TP Formula	18	(Italy) Marco Falci	Dallara F310	R	1–4
TP Formula	18	(Italy) Marco Moscato	Mygale M-10	R	6
TP Formula	19	(Italy) Federico Scionti	Mygale M-10	R	1
TP Formula	19	(Italy) Matteo Beretta	Mygale M-10	R	2–6
RP Motorsport	21	(Finland) Jesse Krohn	Dallara F310		1–7
RP Motorsport	21	(Italy) David Fumanelli	Dallara F310		8
RP Motorsport	55	(Italy) Stefano Bizzarri	Dallara F310		4–5
RP Motorsport	55	(Italy) Kevin Ceccon	Dallara F310		6
RP Motorsport	55	(Venezuela) Biagio Bulnes	Dallara F310		8
Europa Corse	23	(Italy) Leonardo Osmieri	Dallara F310	R	1
Europa Corse	39	(Italy) Alberto Costa	Dallara F310	R	5
Ombra Racing	25	(Italy) Giacomo Barri	Dallara F310	R	All
Ombra Racing	26	(Italy) Alberto Cerqui	Dallara F310	R	All
Scuderia Victoria World	37	(France) Tom Dillmann	Mygale M-10		1
Scuderia Victoria World	39	(Italy) Leonardo Osmieri	Mygale M-10	R	3
Line Race	44	(Italy) Eugenio Palmeri	Mygale M-10	R	1–2, 4
Line Race	45	(Italy) Patrick Cicchiello	Mygale M-10	R	7–8
BVE Racing Team	49	(Italy) Ronnie Valori	Mygale M-10	R	All
Alan Racing Team	51	(Italy) Angelo Fabrizio Comi	Mygale M-10		1
Alan Racing Team	52	(United States) Matt Lee	Mygale M-10	R	1–4
Alan Racing Team	53	(United States) Barrett Mertins	Mygale M-10	R	1–4
Alan Racing Team	54	(Italy) Pasquale Di Sabatino	Mygale M-10		1–2

Icon	Status
R	Rookie

== Calendar ==
Round		Circuit	Date	Pole position	Fastest lap	Winning driver	Winning team
1	R1	(Italy) Misano World Circuit	24 April	(Switzerland) Christopher Zanella	(France) Tom Dillmann	(Italy) Andrea Caldarelli	(Italy) Prema Junior
1	R2	(Italy) Misano World Circuit	25 April		(Italy) Daniel Mancinelli	(Monaco) Stéphane Richelmi	(Italy) Lucidi Motors
2	R1	(Germany) Hockenheimring	13 June	(United States) Gabriel Chaves	(Italy) Daniel Mancinelli	(Italy) Daniel Mancinelli	(Italy) Team Ghinzani
2	R2	(Germany) Hockenheimring	13 June		(Brazil) César Ramos	(Brazil) César Ramos	(Italy) BVM – Target Racing
3	R1	(Italy) Autodromo Enzo e Dino Ferrari, Imola	4 July	(Italy) Daniel Mancinelli	(Brazil) César Ramos	(Italy) Daniel Mancinelli	(Italy) Team Ghinzani
3	R2	(Italy) Autodromo Enzo e Dino Ferrari, Imola	4 July		(Brazil) César Ramos	(Monaco) Stéphane Richelmi	(Italy) Lucidi Motors
4	R1	(Italy) Mugello Circuit	25 July	(Italy) Andrea Caldarelli	(Italy) Andrea Caldarelli	(Italy) Andrea Caldarelli	(Italy) Prema Junior
4	R2	(Italy) Mugello Circuit	25 July		(Italy) Samuele Buttarelli	(Monaco) Stéphane Richelmi	(Italy) Lucidi Motors
5	R1	(Italy) Autodromo Riccardo Paletti, Varano de' Melegari	29 August	(Monaco) Stéphane Richelmi	(Brazil) César Ramos	(Monaco) Stéphane Richelmi	(Italy) Lucidi Motors
5	R2	(Italy) Autodromo Riccardo Paletti, Varano de' Melegari	29 August		(Brazil) César Ramos	(Finland) Jesse Krohn	(Italy) RP Motorsport
6	R1	(Italy) ACI Vallelunga Circuit	26 September	(Brazil) César Ramos	(Brazil) César Ramos	(Brazil) César Ramos	(Italy) BVM – Target Racing
6	R2	(Italy) ACI Vallelunga Circuit	26 September		(Brazil) César Ramos	(Italy) Sergio Campana	(Italy) Lucidi Motors
7	R1	(Italy) Mugello Circuit	10 October	(Italy) Andrea Caldarelli	(Italy) Andrea Caldarelli	(Italy) Andrea Caldarelli	(Italy) Prema Junior
7	R2	(Italy) Mugello Circuit	10 October		(Italy) Sergio Campana	(Italy) Sergio Campana	(Italy) Lucidi Motors
8	R1	(Italy) Autodromo Nazionale Monza	23 October	(Brazil) César Ramos	(Italy) Andrea Caldarelli	(Italy) Sergio Campana	(Italy) Lucidi Motors
8	R2	(Italy) Autodromo Nazionale Monza	24 October		(Italy) Edoardo Liberati	(Brazil) César Ramos	(Italy) BVM – Target Racing

== Standings ==
- Points were awarded as follows:

	1	2	3	4	5	6	7	8	9	10	PP	FL
Race 1	20	15	12	10	8	6	4	3	2	1	**1**	1
Race 2	13	11	9	8	6	5	4	3	2	1		1

Pos	Driver	MIS (Italy)		HOC (Germany)		IMO (Italy)		MUG (Italy)		VAR (Italy)		VLL (Italy)		MUG (Italy)		MZA (Italy)		Points
1	(Brazil) César Ramos	3	3	Ret	1	2	2	4	4	2	6	**1**	7	4	4	**8**	1	161
2	(Monaco) Stéphane Richelmi	5	1	4	Ret	4	1	5	1	**1**	8	3	6	2	2	Ret	2	153
3	(Italy) Andrea Caldarelli	1	4	5	Ret	8	4	**1**	7	3	5	Ret	5	**1**	6	2	4	148
4	(Italy) Daniel Mancinelli	12	6	1	2	**1**	5	2	6	7	3	2	Ret	DSQ	5	4	3	138
5	(Italy) Sergio Campana	14	Ret	2	Ret	6	Ret	6	2	6	2	Ret	1	3	1	1	Ret	114
6	(Switzerland) Christopher Zanella	**2**	5	7	5	10	7	9	5	4	4	4	8	6	16	5	Ret	90
7	(Finland) Jesse Krohn	11	8	3	6	5	3	8	10	8	1	8	9	7	11			66
8	(Italy) Samuele Buttarelli	10	Ret	8	3	22	9	3	3	12	12	Ret	3	Ret	9	20	9	50
9	(Italy) Edoardo Liberati	15	10	11	Ret	7	6	14	9	11	11	7	2	Ret	8	3	10	44
10	(United States) Gabriel Chaves	8	13	**6**	Ret	12	11	7	8	9	10	16	4	5	7	Ret	7	44
11	(United States) Matt Lee	7	12	14	4	9	Ret	17	13	5	7	Ret	11	12	14	18	6	31
12	(France) Nicolas Marroc											5	19	8	3	7	5	30
13	(France) Tom Dillmann	4	2											Ret	20	Ret	20	22
14	(Belgium) Frédéric Vervisch	9	7	9	Ret	3	Ret	DNS	Ret									20
15	(Italy) Kevin Giovesi	6	9	10	8	11	10	12	14	10	9	DSQ	Ret	9	12	Ret	11	18
16	(Canada) Gianmarco Raimondo	16	11	12	11	14	8	15	17	21	18	Ret	10	Ret	10	6	8	14
17	(Italy) Giacomo Barri	22	17	Ret	7	13	14	10	12	15	17	9	16	10	Ret	19	12	8
18	(Italy) Francesco Castellacci	21	Ret	19	15	Ret	15					6	18	13	15	14	13	6
19	(Italy) Alberto Cerqui	28	15	13	9	Ret	13	11	15	17	13	Ret	13	17	Ret	10	21	3
20	(Italy) David Fumanelli															9	14	2
21	(Canada) Tyler Dueck			17	10	19	12									Ret	16	1
22	(Italy) Andrea Roda	26	14	18	13	18	Ret	18	Ret	14	14	10	Ret	14	17	11	18	1
23	(Italy) Vittorio Ghirelli	19	DSQ	DNS	DNS	21	17					Ret	14	11	13			0
24	(Italy) Ronnie Valori	29	Ret	21	Ret	17	18	20	Ret	18	21	11	15	Ret	19	16	15	0
25	(Italy) Stefano Bizzarri							Ret	11	16	15							0
26	(United States) Barrett Mertins	18	18	Ret	Ret	Ret	21	Ret	20	19	20	12	Ret	16	18	12	19	0
27	(Switzerland) Alex Fontana	25	22	15	12	15	16	16	18	13	16	15	Ret	15	21	13	Ret	0
28	(Italy) Kevin Ceccon											Ret	12					0
29	(Canada) Nelson Mason			16	14	16	Ret	13	Ret									0
30	(Italy) Pasquale Di Sabatino	13	Ret	Ret	19			DNS	DNS									0
31	(Italy) Marco Moscato											13	Ret					0
32	(Italy) Edolo Ghirelli											14	17					0
33	(Venezuela) Biagio Bulnes															15	Ret	0
34	(Italy) Eugenio Palmeri	24	Ret	20	16			Ret	16									0
35	(Italy) Federico Scionti	23	16	Ret	17													0
36	(Italy) Patrick Cicchiello													18	Ret	17	17	0
37	(Italy) Marco Falci	17	23	22	Ret	23	22	Ret	19									0
38	(Italy) Matteo Beretta			23	18	20	20	19	Ret	Ret	Ret	Ret	Ret					0
39	(Italy) Leonardo Osmieri	27	19			Ret	19			Ret	22							0
40	(Italy) Alberto Costa									20	19							0
41	(United Kingdom) Dino Zamparelli	20	20															0
42	(Italy) Angelo Fabrizio Comi	Ret	21															0
Pos	Driver	MIS (Italy)		HOC (Germany)		IMO (Italy)		MUG (Italy)		VAR (Italy)		VLL (Italy)		MUG (Italy)		MZA (Italy)		Points

Colour	Result
Gold	Winner
Silver	Second place
Bronze	Third place
Green	Points classification
Blue	Non-points classification
Blue	Non-classified finish (NC)
Purple	Retired, not classified (Ret)
Red	Did not qualify (DNQ)
Red	Did not pre-qualify (DNPQ)
Black	Disqualified (DSQ)
White	Did not start (DNS)
White	Withdrew (WD)
White	Race cancelled (C)
Blank	Did not practice (DNP)
Blank	Did not arrive (DNA)
Blank	Excluded (EX)

**Bold** – Pole
Italics – Fastest Lap
