= Matteo Davenia =

Italian racing driver

- Nationality: (Italy) Italian
- Born: 7 January 1993 (age 33) Milan (Italy)

Previous series
- 2009 2009 2009 2009 2008: Formula Renault 2.0 Suisse; International Formula Master; Formula Renault 2.0 Italia; Formula 2000 Light Italy; Italian Formula Three

Matteo Davenia (born 7 January 1993 in Milan) is an Italian former racing driver.

== Career ==
=== Karting ===
Davenia began his motorsport career in karting back in 2003, finishing fourth in the Italian Junior Championship. He was also champion of the 2007 Italian Rotax 125 championship.

=== Formula Three ===
Davenia moved up to single-seaters in 2008, competing in the Italian Formula Three Championship finale at Vallelunga, driving for Europa Corse in the Trofeo Nazionale CSAI class. He finished 23rd overall in the championship, after finishing tenth and thirteenth in the two races.

=== Formula Renault ===
Davenia joined the Cram Competition team in 2009, to compete in the Formule Renault 2.0 Suisse championship. He wasn't so successful in this series, winding up fourteenth in the championship. In the Formula 2000 Light Italy and Formula Renault 2.0 Italy, he was a guest driver at Monza.

=== International Formula Master ===
In the third round at Brno of the 2009 season, Davenia was a guest driver in the International Formula Master series, with Cram Competition. He finished fourteenth in the first race and twelfth in the second race.

== Racing record ==
=== Career summary ===
Season	Series	Team	Races	Wins	Poles	F/Laps	Podiums	Points	Position
2008	Italian Formula Three	Europa Corse	2	0	0	0	0	0	23rd
2009	LO Formula Renault 2.0 Suisse	Cram Competition	12	0	0	0	0	36	14th
2009	Formula Renault 2.0 Italy	Cram Competition	2	0	0	0	0	2	30th
2009	International Formula Master	Cram Competition	2	0	0	0	0	0	23rd
2009	Formula 2000 Light Italy	CO2 Motorsport	2	0	0	0	0	36	23rd
2011	European F3 Open	RP Motorsport	16	0	0	0	0	8	19th
2012	European F3 Open	DAV Racing	16	0	0	0	0	46	6th [C]
