= Noel Jammal =

Lebanese-Spanish car racer (born 1990)

- Nationality: Spanish and Lebanese
- Full name: Noel Jammal Fernández
- Born: 3 March 1990 (age 36) Madrid, Spain

Noel Jammal Fernández (Arabic: نويل جمّال, born 3 March 1990 in Madrid) is a Lebanese-Spanish Formula 3 driver who is in Cedars Motorsport group founded by his father Youssef Jammal and he regularly represents in international competition.

Jammal was a karting enthusiast at an early age. On his eighteenth birthday, he asked his parents to give him a test drive on a racing car as a gift. He did very well, after which his family financed his endeavour in professional car racing. At nineteen, he became champion for Madrid City and then made his participation in an official circuit racing championship in 2009. His first win and gold trophy was at the Circuito de Jerez of the European Formula 3 Open Championship in Spain in 2011.

In 2011, Jammel was picked as ambassador for Lebanese public awareness campaign Kunhadi (Be calm), promoting safe driving among Lebanese youth.
