= Juan Carlos Sistos =

Mexican racing driver (born 1992)

- Born: March 23, 1992 (age 34) Lázaro Cárdenas, Michoacán(Mexico)

British Formula 3 Championship career
- Debut season: 2010
- Current team: Motul Team West-Tec
- Car number: 46
- Starts: 3

Previous series
- 2009: Euroseries 3000

Juan Carlos Sistos is a Mexican racing driver. He has competed in such series as Euroseries 3000 and the European F3 Open Championship.

In August 2010, it was announced that Sistos had joined Motul Team West-Tec for British Formula 3, and he took a sensational National Class win on his debut at the famous Silverstone Grand Prix Circuit.
