= 2015 Yas Marina GP3 Series round =

(United Arab Emirates) 2015 Yas Marina GP3 round
Round details
- Round 9 of 9 rounds in the 2015 GP3 Series
- Layout of the Yas Marina Circuit
- Location: Yas Marina Circuit, Abu Dhabi, United Arab Emirates
- Course: Permanent racing facility 5.554 km (3.451 mi)

GP3 Series

Race 1
- Date: 28 November 2015
- Laps: 18

Pole position
Driver	(France) Esteban Ocon	ART Grand Prix
- Time: 1:55.491

Podium
First	(Germany) Marvin Kirchhöfer	ART Grand Prix
Second	(United Kingdom) Emil Bernstorff	Arden International
Third	(Sweden) Jimmy Eriksson	Koiranen GP

Fastest lap
Driver	(France) Esteban Ocon	ART Grand Prix
- Time: 1:57.978 (on lap 4)

Race 2
- Date: 29 November 2015
- Laps: 14

Podium
First	(Spain) Alex Palou	Campos Racing
Second	(Italy) Antonio Fuoco	Carlin
Third	(France) Esteban Ocon	ART Grand Prix

Fastest lap
Driver	(Spain) Alex Palou	Campos Racing
- Time: 1:57.865 (on lap 4)

The 2015 Yas Marina GP3 Series round was a GP3 Series motor race held on November 28 and 29, 2015 at Yas Marina Circuit, Abu Dhabi. It was the final weekend of the 2015 GP3 Series. The race supported the 2015 Abu Dhabi Grand Prix.

== Classification ==
=== Qualifying ===
Pos	No	Driver	Team	Time	Grid
1	6	(France) Esteban Ocon	ART Grand Prix	1:55.491	1
2	14	(Italy) Kevin Ceccon	Arden International	1:55.507	2
3	5	(Germany) Marvin Kirchhöfer	ART Grand Prix	1:55.549	3
4	27	(Italy) Luca Ghiotto	Trident	1:55.574	4
5	11	(Sweden) Jimmy Eriksson	Koiranen GP	1:55.679	5
6	15	(United Kingdom) Emil Bernstorff	Arden International	1:55.852	6
7	1	(Italy) Antonio Fuoco	Carlin	1:55.873	7
8	24	(Spain) Alex Palou	Campos Racing	1:55.919	8
9	12	(United Kingdom) Matt Parry	Koiranen GP	1:55.952	9
10	26	(Poland) Artur Janosz	Trident	1:56.064	10
11	20	(Norway) Pål Varhaug	Jenzer Motorsport	1:56.095	11
12	3	(Australia) Mitchell Gilbert	Carlin	1:56.205	12
13	21	(Switzerland) Mathéo Tuscher	Jenzer Motorsport	1:56.265	13
14	22	(Switzerland) Ralph Boschung	Jenzer Motorsport	1:56.284	14
15	10	(Russia) Matevos Isaakyan	Koiranen GP	1:56.313	15
16	23	(Kuwait) Zaid Ashkanani	Campos Racing	1:56.361	16
17	8	(Switzerland) Alex Fontana	Status Grand Prix	1:56.538	17
18	7	(United Kingdom) Seb Morris	Status Grand Prix	1:56.871	23
19	2	(Hong Kong) Adderly Fong	Carlin	1:56.877	18
20	9	(Thailand) Sandy Stuvik	Status Grand Prix	1:56.936	19
21	28	(Italy) Michele Beretta	Trident	1:57.030	20
22	4	(Mexico) Alfonso Celis Jr.	ART Grand Prix	1:57.163	21
23	25	(Russia) Konstantin Tereshchenko	Campos Racing	1:57.468	22
24	16	(Poland) Aleksander Bosak	Arden International	1:58.865	24

=== Feature Race ===
Pos	No	Driver	Team	Laps	Time/Retired	Grid	Points
1	5	(Germany) Marvin Kirchhöfer	ART Grand Prix	18	38:13.565	3	25+4
2	15	(United Kingdom) Emil Bernstorff	Arden International	18	+0.618	6	18
3	11	(Sweden) Jimmy Eriksson	Koiranen GP	18	+1.299	5	15
4	6	(France) Esteban Ocon	ART Grand Prix	18	+1.973	1	12+2
5	27	(Italy) Luca Ghiotto	Trident	18	+5.407	4	10
6	12	(United Kingdom) Matt Parry	Koiranen GP	18	+6.694	9	8
7	1	(Italy) Antonio Fuoco	Carlin	18	+14.728	7	6
8	24	(Spain) Alex Palou	Campos Racing	18	+15.382	8	4
9	10	(Russia) Matevos Isaakyan	Koiranen GP	18	+15.946	15	2
10	26	(Poland) Artur Janosz	Trident	18	+17.538	10	1
11	20	(Norway) Pål Varhaug	Jenzer Motorsport	18	+18.810	11	
12	22	(Switzerland) Ralph Boschung	Jenzer Motorsport	18	+19.274	14	
13	7	(United Kingdom) Seb Morris	Status Grand Prix	18	+20.244	23	
14	3	(Australia) Mitchell Gilbert	Carlin	18	+21.205	12	
15	8	(Switzerland) Alex Fontana	Status Grand Prix	18	+21.760	17	
16	21	(Switzerland) Mathéo Tuscher	Jenzer Motorsport	18	+24.542	13	
17	9	(Thailand) Sandy Stuvik	Status Grand Prix	18	+32.754	19	
18	16	(Poland) Aleksander Bosak	Arden International	18	+36.882	24	
19	23	(Kuwait) Zaid Ashkanani	Campos Racing	18	+39.805	16	
20	28	(Italy) Michele Beretta	Trident	18	+1:43.964	20	
Ret	14	(Italy) Kevin Ceccon	Arden International	7	Retired	2	
Ret	4	(Mexico) Alfonso Celis Jr.	ART Grand Prix	3	Retired	21	
Ret	2	(Hong Kong) Adderly Fong	Carlin	0	Retired	18	
Ret	25	(Russia) Konstantin Tereshchenko	Campos Racing	0	Retired	22	

=== Sprint Race ===
Pos	No	Driver	Team	Laps	Time/Retired	Grid	Points
1	24	(Spain) Alex Palou	Campos Racing	14	27:46.982	1	15+2
2	1	(Italy) Antonio Fuoco	Carlin	14	+4.429	2	12
3	6	(France) Esteban Ocon	ART Grand Prix	14	+5.372	5	10
4	27	(Italy) Luca Ghiotto	Trident	14	+6.462	4	8
5	11	(Sweden) Jimmy Eriksson	Koiranen GP	14	+7.694	6	6
6	15	(United Kingdom) Emil Bernstorff	Arden International	14	+8.245	7	4
7	5	(Germany) Marvin Kirchhöfer	ART Grand Prix	14	+9.526	8	2
8	20	(Norway) Pål Varhaug	Jenzer Motorsport	14	+10.058	11	1
9	26	(Poland) Artur Janosz	Trident	14	+13.187	10	
10	14	(Italy) Kevin Ceccon	Arden International	14	+15.434	21	
11	22	(Switzerland) Ralph Boschung	Jenzer Motorsport	14	+16.083	12	
12	10	(Russia) Matevos Isaakyan	Koiranen GP	14	+16.814	9	
13	8	(Switzerland) Alex Fontana	Status Grand Prix	14	+18.190	15	
14	21	(Switzerland) Mathéo Tuscher	Jenzer Motorsport	14	+19.912	16	
15	7	(United Kingdom) Seb Morris	Status Grand Prix	14	+22.839	13	
16	9	(Thailand) Sandy Stuvik	Status Grand Prix	14	+26.239	17	
17	3	(Australia) Mitchell Gilbert	Carlin	14	+30.035	14	
18	28	(Italy) Michele Beretta	Trident	14	+30.434	20	
19	4	(Mexico) Alfonso Celis Jr.	ART Grand Prix	14	+30.825	22	
20	25	(Russia) Konstantin Tereshchenko	Campos Racing	14	+31.472	24	
21	23	(Kuwait) Zaid Ashkanani	Campos Racing	14	+32.028	19	
22	2	(Hong Kong) Adderly Fong	Carlin	14	+45.495	23	
23	16	(Poland) Aleksander Bosak	Arden International	14	+46.431	18	
24	12	(United Kingdom) Matt Parry	Koiranen GP	14	+1:21.154	3	

== See also ==
- 2015 Abu Dhabi Grand Prix
- 2015 Yas Marina GP2 Series round

Previous round: 2015 Bahrain GP3 Series round	GP3 Series; 2015 season	Next round: 2016 Catalunya GP3 Series round
Previous round: 2014 Yas Marina GP3 Series round	Yas Marina GP3 round	Next round: 2016 Yas Marina GP3 Series round
