= 2014 Sochi GP3 Series round =

(Russia) 2014 Sochi GP3 round
Round details
- Round 8 of 9 rounds in the 2014 GP3 Series
- Layout of the Sochi Autodrom
- Location: Sochi Autodrom; Sochi, Krasnodar Krai, Russia
- Course: Semi-permanent racing facility 5.853 km (3.637 mi)

GP3 Series

Race 1
- Date: 11 October 2014
- Laps: 15

Pole position
Driver	(United Kingdom) Dean Stoneman	Koiranen GP
- Time: 1:51.715

Podium
First	(United Kingdom) Dean Stoneman	Koiranen GP
Second	(Germany) Marvin Kirchhöfer	ART Grand Prix
Third	(Switzerland) Alex Fontana	ART Grand Prix

Fastest lap
Driver	(United Kingdom) Dean Stoneman	Koiranen GP
- Time: 1:53.889 (on lap 14)

Race 2
- Date: 12 October 2014
- Laps: 15

Podium
First	(Switzerland) Patric Niederhauser	Arden International
Second	(United Kingdom) Dean Stoneman	Koiranen GP
Third	(Germany) Marvin Kirchhöfer	ART Grand Prix

Fastest lap
Driver	(Sweden) Jimmy Eriksson	Koiranen GP
- Time: 1:53.864 (on lap 8)

The 2014 Sochi GP3 Series round was a GP3 Series motor race held on October 11 and 12, 2014 at Sochi Autodrom, Russia. It was the eighth round of the 2014 GP3 Series. The race supported the 2014 Russian Grand Prix.

Dean Stoneman won the feature race from pole position.

== Classification ==
=== Summary ===
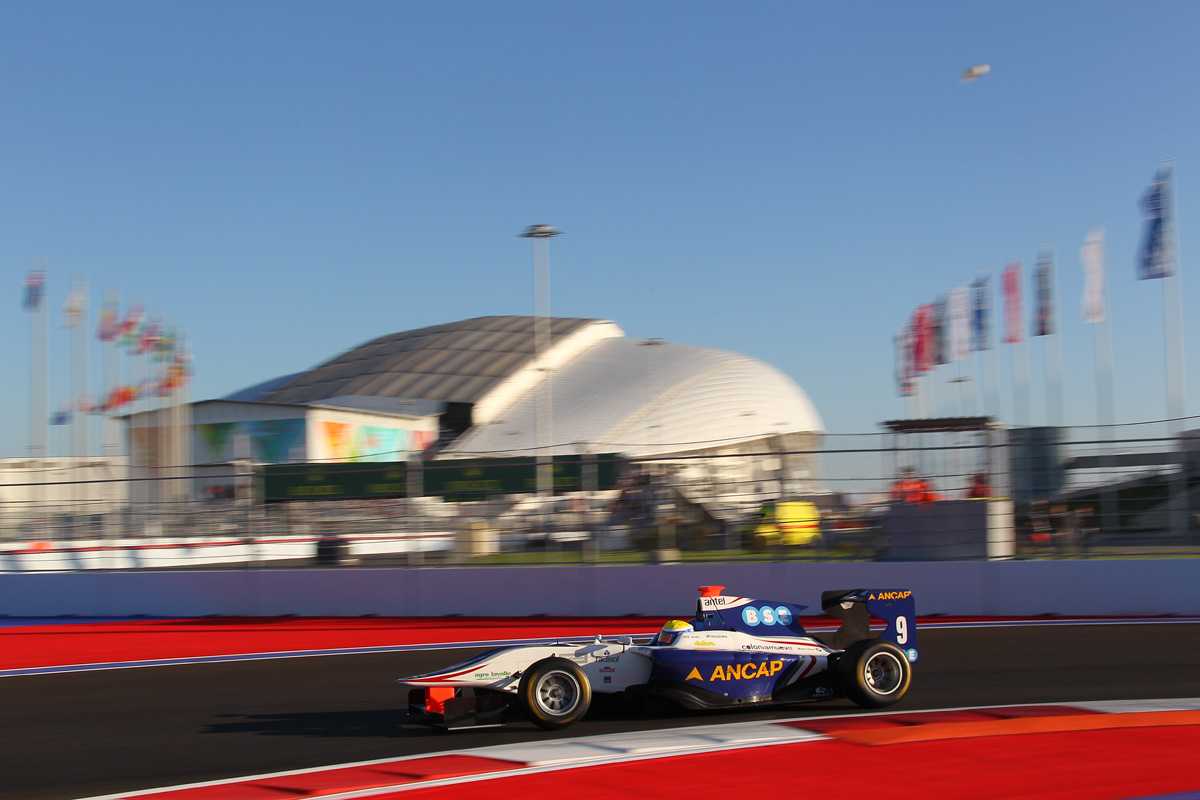
Santiago Urrutia

Marussia Manor Racing pulled out of the series before the race weekend due to 'commercial reasons'. Dean Stoneman moved to Koiranen GP, replacing Carmen Jordá, and Patrick Kujala moved to Trident in place of John Bryant-Meisner; Ryan Cullen did not compete. Luca Ghiotto also did not return, leaving Trident with just two cars. At Hilmer Motorsport, Nikolay Martsenko returned for the first race since round two, replacing Sebastian Balthasar.

Stoneman took his maiden pole position in qualifying, almost half a second ahead of Alex Fontana. He had a good start and led every lap to win the race, on the same weekend that he was forced to switch teams. Maximum points raised him from sixth to third in the overall standings. The rest of the podium was a 2-3 for ART Grand Prix with Marvin Kirchhöfer and Fontana, who managed to hold off Jimmy Eriksson.

Patric Niederhauser started on pole for race two. The race was red-flagged on the opening lap due to a collision that took out four cars; Stoneman was involved but managed to continue. Niederhauser led at the restart from Jann Mardenborough, Kirchhöfer and Stoneman. A late safety car to recover the car of Nikolay Martsenko resulted in a two-lap sprint to the finish. Kirchhöfer and Stoneman both passed Mardenborough, but despite them pulling alongside Niederhauser multiple times, the German driver held on to take the win. A second podium for Stoneman meant that Alex Lynn did not secure the championship, going into the final round with a gap of 47 points with 48 available.

=== Qualifying ===
Pos	No	Driver	Team	Time	Grid
1	7	(United Kingdom) Dean Stoneman	Koiranen GP	1:51.715	1
2	1	(Switzerland) Alex Fontana	ART Grand Prix	1:52.204	2
3	2	(Germany) Marvin Kirchhöfer	ART Grand Prix	1:52.208	3
4	3	(United Kingdom) Dino Zamparelli	ART Grand Prix	1:52.288	4
5	8	(Sweden) Jimmy Eriksson	Koiranen GP	1:52.388	5
6	27	(New Zealand) Richie Stanaway	Status Grand Prix	1:52.476	PL^{1}
7	22	(Italy) Kevin Ceccon	Jenzer Motorsport	1:52.499	6
8	10	(United Kingdom) Alex Lynn	Carlin	1:52.506	7
9	5	(Switzerland) Patric Niederhauser	Arden International	1:52.527	8
10	11	(United Kingdom) Emil Bernstorff	Carlin	1:52.537	9
11	26	(United Kingdom) Nick Yelloly	Status Grand Prix	1:52.607	10
12	6	(United Kingdom) Jann Mardenborough	Arden International	1:52.906	11
13	21	(Switzerland) Mathéo Tuscher	Jenzer Motorsport	1:52.981	12
14	4	(Romania) Robert Vișoiu	Arden International	1:53.019	13
15	19	(Italy) Riccardo Agostini	Hilmer Motorsport	1:53.151	14
16	25	(Australia) Mitchell Gilbert	Trident	1:53.190	15
17	20	(Norway) Pål Varhaug	Jenzer Motorsport	1:53.193	16
18	24	(Finland) Patrick Kujala	Trident	1:53.386	17
19	28	(Mexico) Alfonso Celis Jr.	Status Grand Prix	1:53.693	18
20	12	(Macau) Luís Sá Silva	Carlin	1:53.742	19
21	9	(Uruguay) Santiago Urrutia	Koiranen GP	1:53.744	20
22	18	(Canada) Nelson Mason	Hilmer Motorsport	1:54.191	21
23	17	(Russia) Nikolay Martsenko	Hilmer Motorsport	1:54.700	22

- ^1 Richie Stanaway was required to start from the pitlane for failing to weigh his car during qualifying.

=== Feature Race ===
Pos	No	Driver	Team	Laps	Time/Retired	Grid	Points
1	7	(United Kingdom) Dean Stoneman	Koiranen GP	15	28:45.648	1	25+4+2
2	2	(Germany) Marvin Kirchhöfer	ART Grand Prix	15	+1.812	3	18
3	1	(Switzerland) Alex Fontana	ART Grand Prix	15	+4.978	2	15
4	8	(Sweden) Jimmy Eriksson	Koiranen GP	15	+8.862	5	12
5	22	(Italy) Kevin Ceccon	Jenzer Motorsport	15	+13.235	6	10
6	6	(United Kingdom) Jann Mardenborough	Arden International	15	+13.683	11	8
7	10	(United Kingdom) Alex Lynn	Carlin	15	+14.740	7	6
8	5	(Switzerland) Patric Niederhauser	Arden International	15	+15.056	8	4
9	26	(United Kingdom) Nick Yelloly	Status Grand Prix	15	+16.243	10	2
10	20	(Norway) Pål Varhaug	Jenzer Motorsport	15	+21.985	16	1
11	19	(Italy) Riccardo Agostini	Hilmer Motorsport	15	+22.859	14	
12	27	(New Zealand) Richie Stanaway	Status Grand Prix	15	+24.904	23	
13	24	(Finland) Patrick Kujala	Trident	15	+28.005	17	
14	9	(Uruguay) Santiago Urrutia	Koiranen GP	15	+34.045	20	
15	18	(Canada) Nelson Mason	Hilmer Motorsport	15	+39.097	21	
16	28	(Mexico) Alfonso Celis Jr.	Status Grand Prix	15	+39.852	18	
17	12	(Macau) Luís Sá Silva	Carlin	15	+42.002	19	
18	3	(United Kingdom) Dino Zamparelli	ART Grand Prix	15	+46.834	4	
19	17	(Russia) Nikolay Martsenko	Hilmer Motorsport	15	+52.299	22	
20	25	(Australia) Mitchell Gilbert	Trident	15	+1:46.264	15	
Ret	21	(Switzerland) Mathéo Tuscher	Jenzer Motorsport	4	Retired	12	
Ret	4	(Romania) Robert Vișoiu	Arden International	1	Retired	13	
Ret	11	(United Kingdom) Emil Bernstorff	Carlin	1	Retired	9	
Fastest lap: Dean Stoneman (Koiranen GP) — 1:53.889 (on lap 14)

=== Sprint Race ===
Pos	No	Driver	Team	Laps	Time/Retired	Grid	Points
1	5	(Switzerland) Patric Niederhauser	Arden International	15	54:22.342	1	15
2	7	(United Kingdom) Dean Stoneman	Koiranen GP	15	+0.368	8	12
3	2	(Germany) Marvin Kirchhöfer	ART Grand Prix	15	+0.683	7	10+2
4	6	(United Kingdom) Jann Mardenborough	Arden International	15	+1.144	3	8
5	10	(United Kingdom) Alex Lynn	Carlin	15	+1.416	2	6
6	26	(United Kingdom) Nick Yelloly	Status Grand Prix	15	+1.869	9	4
7	28	(Mexico) Alfonso Celis Jr.	Status Grand Prix	15	+2.330	16	2
8	11	(United Kingdom) Emil Bernstorff	Carlin	15	+3.003	22	1
9	24	(Finland) Patrick Kujala	Trident	15	+3.540	13	
10	4	(Romania) Robert Vișoiu	Arden International	15	+3.977	23	
11	21	(Switzerland) Mathéo Tuscher	Jenzer Motorsport	15	+4.681	21	
12	9	(Uruguay) Santiago Urrutia	Koiranen GP	15	+6.103	14	
13	3	(United Kingdom) Dino Zamparelli	ART Grand Prix	15	+7.844	18	
14	25	(Australia) Mitchell Gilbert	Trident	15	+8.135	20	
15	12	(Macau) Luís Sá Silva	Carlin	15	+8.555	17	
16	8	(Sweden) Jimmy Eriksson	Koiranen GP	15	+9.153	5	
Ret	22	(Italy) Kevin Ceccon	Jenzer Motorsport	9	Retired	4	
Ret	17	(Russia) Nikolay Martsenko	Hilmer Motorsport	9	Retired	19	
Ret	19	(Italy) Riccardo Agostini	Hilmer Motorsport	0	Retired	11	
Ret	1	(Switzerland) Alex Fontana	ART Grand Prix	0	Retired	6	
Ret	20	(Norway) Pål Varhaug	Jenzer Motorsport	0	Retired	10	
Ret	27	(New Zealand) Richie Stanaway	Status Grand Prix	0	Retired	12	
DNS	18	(Canada) Nelson Mason	Hilmer Motorsport	0	Did not start	15	
Fastest lap: Jimmy Eriksson (Koiranen GP) — 1:53.864 (on lap 8)^{1}

- ^1 Jimmy Eriksson set the fastest lap, but did not finish in the top 10, so was ineligible to be the point-scorer for the fastest lap. Marvin Kirchhöfer was the point-scorer instead for setting the fastest lap of those finishing in the top 10.

== Standings after the round ==
Drivers' Championship standings

	Pos.	Driver	Points
	1	(United Kingdom) Alex Lynn	185
6	2	(United Kingdom) Dean Stoneman	138
2	3	(Germany) Marvin Kirchhöfer	137
1	4	(Sweden) Jimmy Eriksson	127
3	5	(New Zealand) Richie Stanaway	123

Teams' Championship standings

	Pos.	Team	Points
	1	(United Kingdom) Carlin	303
	2	(France) ART Grand Prix	273
	3	(Canada) Status Grand Prix	233
2	4	(Finland) Koiranen GP	170
1	5	(United Kingdom) Arden International	155

- Note: Only the top five positions are included for both sets of standings.

== See also ==
- 2014 Russian Grand Prix
- 2014 Sochi GP2 Series round

Previous round: 2014 Monza GP3 Series round	GP3 Series; 2014 season	Next round: 2014 Yas Marina GP3 Series round
Previous round: none	Sochi GP3 round	Next round: 2015 Sochi GP3 Series round
