= 2014 Sochi GP2 and GP3 Series rounds =

This could refer to either the:

- 2014 Sochi GP2 Series round
- 2014 Sochi GP3 Series round
