= 2014 Yas Marina GP3 Series round =

Motor race

(United Arab Emirates) 2014 Yas Marina GP3 round
Round details
- Round 9 of 9 rounds in the 2014 GP3 Series
- Layout of the Yas Marina Circuit
- Location: Yas Marina Circuit, Abu Dhabi, United Arab Emirates
- Course: Permanent racing facility 5.554 km (3.451 mi)

GP3 Series

Race 1
- Date: 21 November 2014
- Laps: 14

Pole position
Driver	(Germany) Marvin Kirchhöfer	ART Grand Prix
- Time: 1:55.163

Podium
First	(United Kingdom) Dean Stoneman	Koiranen GP
Second	(Germany) Marvin Kirchhöfer	ART Grand Prix
Third	(United Kingdom) Dino Zamparelli	ART Grand Prix

Fastest lap
Driver	(Germany) Marvin Kirchhöfer	ART Grand Prix
- Time: 1:56.888 (on lap 5)

Race 2
- Date: 22 November 2014
- Laps: 14

Podium
First	(United Kingdom) Nick Yelloly	Status Grand Prix
Second	(United Kingdom) Alex Lynn	Carlin
Third	(United Kingdom) Emil Bernstorff	Carlin

Fastest lap
Driver	(Switzerland) Alex Fontana	ART Grand Prix
- Time: 1:57.716 (on lap 8)

The 2014 Yas Marina GP3 Series round was a GP3 Series motor race held on November 21 and 22, 2014 at Yas Marina Circuit, Abu Dhabi. It was the final weekend of the 2014 GP3 Series. The race supported the 2014 Abu Dhabi Grand Prix.

== Classification ==
=== Summary ===
Trident made changes to their lineup for the final round: Luca Ghiotto was replaced by Kang Ling, and Patrick Kujala moved to the #25 car to replace Mitchell Gilbert, with former Marussia Manor Racing driver Ryan Cullen taking the now-empty #24 seat. In addition, Nikolay Martsenko was not present, leaving Hilmer Motorsport with two cars for the weekend.

In order to stay in championship contention, Dean Stoneman needed to qualify in pole position. However, it was Marvin Kirchhöfer who took the top spot, with Alex Lynn therefore securing the championship title. Stoneman took the lead from Kirchhöfer into the first corner and held him off for the rest of the race to take his fifth win of the season. Dino Zamparelli rounded out the podium.

Nick Yelloly started on pole for race two. It was Patric Niederhauser who got the better start though, beating Yelloly to turn one. Niederhauser built a gap of almost five seconds over Yelloly to win his third sprint race of the year. However, after the race it was found that Niederhauser's rear wing did not conform with the technical regulations, and he was disqualified from the race, promoting Yelloly to first. With Lynn in second, Carlin secured the teams' championship.

=== Qualifying ===
Pos	No	Driver	Team	Time	Grid
1	2	(Germany) Marvin Kirchhöfer	ART Grand Prix	1:55.163	1
2	7	(United Kingdom) Dean Stoneman	Koiranen GP	1:55.634	2
3	11	(United Kingdom) Emil Bernstorff	Carlin	1:55.664	3
4	10	(United Kingdom) Alex Lynn	Carlin	1:55.729	4
5	3	(United Kingdom) Dino Zamparelli	ART Grand Prix	1:55.819	5
6	8	(Sweden) Jimmy Eriksson	Koiranen GP	1:55.863	6
7	1	(Switzerland) Alex Fontana	ART Grand Prix	1:55.900	7
8	5	(Switzerland) Patric Niederhauser	Arden International	1:55.995	8
9	26	(United Kingdom) Nick Yelloly	Status Grand Prix	1:56.038	9
10	27	(New Zealand) Richie Stanaway	Status Grand Prix	1:56.113	10
11	22	(Italy) Kevin Ceccon	Jenzer Motorsport	1:56.145	11
12	25	(Finland) Patrick Kujala	Trident	1:56.199	12
13	6	(United Kingdom) Jann Mardenborough	Arden International	1:56.291	13
14	9	(Uruguay) Santiago Urrutia	Koiranen GP	1:56.443	14
15	21	(Switzerland) Mathéo Tuscher	Jenzer Motorsport	1:56.498	15
16	4	(Romania) Robert Vișoiu	Arden International	1:56.501	16
17	20	(Norway) Pål Varhaug	Jenzer Motorsport	1:56.530	17
18	12	(Macau) Luís Sá Silva	Carlin	1:56.873	18
19	19	(Italy) Riccardo Agostini	Hilmer Motorsport	1:56.941	19
20	18	(Canada) Nelson Mason	Hilmer Motorsport	1:56.959	20
21	28	(Mexico) Alfonso Celis Jr.	Status Grand Prix	1:57.577	21
22	24	(United Kingdom) Ryan Cullen	Trident	1:57.697	22
23	23	(China) Kang Ling	Trident	1:58.816	23

=== Feature Race ===
Pos	No	Driver	Team	Laps	Time/Retired	Grid	Points
1	7	(United Kingdom) Dean Stoneman	Koiranen GP	14	29:10.173	2	25
2	2	(Germany) Marvin Kirchhöfer	ART Grand Prix	14	+0.800	1	18+4+2
3	3	(United Kingdom) Dino Zamparelli	ART Grand Prix	14	+5.423	5	15
4	11	(United Kingdom) Emil Bernstorff	Carlin	14	+6.808	3	12
5	10	(United Kingdom) Alex Lynn	Carlin	14	+9.441	4	10
6	1	(Switzerland) Alex Fontana	ART Grand Prix	14	+10.464	7	8
7	5	(Switzerland) Patric Niederhauser	Arden International	14	+12.174	8	6
8	26	(United Kingdom) Nick Yelloly	Status Grand Prix	14	+13.296	9	4
9	22	(Italy) Kevin Ceccon	Jenzer Motorsport	14	+15.414	11	2
10	8	(Sweden) Jimmy Eriksson	Koiranen GP	14	+16.173	6	1
11	9	(Uruguay) Santiago Urrutia	Koiranen GP	14	+22.559	14	
12	27	(New Zealand) Richie Stanaway	Status Grand Prix	14	+23.097	10	
13	6	(United Kingdom) Jann Mardenborough	Arden International	14	+23.677	13	
14	20	(Norway) Pål Varhaug	Jenzer Motorsport	14	+24.419	17	
15	4	(Romania) Robert Vișoiu	Arden International	14	+25.203	16	
16	28	(Mexico) Alfonso Celis Jr.	Status Grand Prix	14	+27.534	21	
17	18	(Canada) Nelson Mason	Hilmer Motorsport	14	+31.020	20	
18	19	(Italy) Riccardo Agostini	Hilmer Motorsport	14	+33.738	19	
19	24	(United Kingdom) Ryan Cullen	Trident	14	+34.463	22	
20	23	(China) Kang Ling	Trident	14	+39.273	23	
Ret	21	(Switzerland) Mathéo Tuscher	Jenzer Motorsport	2	Retired	15	
Ret	25	(Finland) Patrick Kujala	Trident	0	Retired	12	
Ret	12	(Macau) Luís Sá Silva	Carlin	0	Retired	18	
Fastest lap: Marvin Kirchhöfer (ART Grand Prix) — 1:56.888 (on lap 5)

=== Sprint Race ===
Pos	No	Driver	Team	Laps	Time/Retired	Grid	Points
1	26	(United Kingdom) Nick Yelloly	Status Grand Prix	14	28:29.039	1	15
2	10	(United Kingdom) Alex Lynn	Carlin	14	+2.778	4	12
3	11	(United Kingdom) Emil Bernstorff	Carlin	14	+3.491	5	10
4	3	(United Kingdom) Dino Zamparelli	ART Grand Prix	14	+5.534	6	8+2
5	8	(Sweden) Jimmy Eriksson	Koiranen GP	14	+10.214	10	6
6	22	(Italy) Kevin Ceccon	Jenzer Motorsport	14	+8.260^{1}	9	4
7	27	(New Zealand) Richie Stanaway	Status Grand Prix	14	+12.978	12	2
8	4	(Romania) Robert Vișoiu	Arden International	14	+13.552	15	1
9	20	(Norway) Pål Varhaug	Jenzer Motorsport	14	+17.294	14	
10	21	(Switzerland) Mathéo Tuscher	Jenzer Motorsport	14	+19.007	21	
11	2	(Germany) Marvin Kirchhöfer	ART Grand Prix	14	+19.585	7	
12	9	(Uruguay) Santiago Urrutia	Koiranen GP	14	+25.889	11	
13	19	(Italy) Riccardo Agostini	Hilmer Motorsport	14	+26.239	18	
14	25	(Finland) Patrick Kujala	Trident	14	+26.963	PL^{2}	
15	1	(Switzerland) Alex Fontana	ART Grand Prix	14	+27.553	3	
16	23	(China) Kang Ling	Trident	14	+38.359	20	
17	12	(Macau) Luís Sá Silva	Carlin	14	+58.213	22	
18	18	(Canada) Nelson Mason	Hilmer Motorsport	13	+1 lap	17	
Ret	6	(United Kingdom) Jann Mardenborough	Arden International	10	Retired	13	
Ret	28	(Mexico) Alfonso Celis Jr.	Status Grand Prix	8	Retired	16	
Ret	7	(United Kingdom) Dean Stoneman	Koiranen GP	1	Retired	8	
Ret	24	(United Kingdom) Ryan Cullen	Trident	1	Retired	19	
DSQ	5	(Switzerland) Patric Niederhauser	Arden International	14	Disqualified^{3}	2	
Fastest lap: Alex Fontana (ART Grand Prix) — 1:57.716 (on lap 8)^{4}

- ^1 Kevin Ceccon originally finished 5th, but was given a one-place penalty for leaving the track and gaining an advantage.
- ^2 Patrick Kujala was given a five-place grid penalty converted to a pitlane start for causing a collision in race 1.
- ^3 Patric Niederhauser won the race, but was later disqualified for a technical infringement.
- ^4 Alex Fontana set the fastest lap, but did not finish in the top 10, so was ineligible to be the point-scorer for the fastest lap. Dino Zamparelli was the point-scorer instead for setting the fastest lap of those finishing in the top 10.

== Final championship standings ==
Drivers' Championship standings

	Pos.	Driver	Points
	1	(United Kingdom) **Alex Lynn**	**207**
	2	(United Kingdom) Dean Stoneman	163
	3	(Germany) Marvin Kirchhöfer	161
	4	(Sweden) Jimmy Eriksson	134
1	5	(United Kingdom) Emil Bernstorff	134

Teams' Championship standings

Pos.	Team	Points
1	(United Kingdom) **Carlin**	**347**
2	(France) ART Grand Prix	330
3	(Canada) Status Grand Prix	254
4	(Finland) Koiranen GP	202
5	(United Kingdom) Arden International	162

- Note: Only the top five positions are included for both sets of standings.
- Note: Bold names indicate the 2014 Drivers' and Teams' Champion respectively.

== See also ==
- 2014 Abu Dhabi Grand Prix
- 2014 Yas Marina GP2 Series round

Previous round: 2014 Monza GP3 Series round	GP3 Series; 2014 season	Next round: 2015 Catalunya GP3 Series round
Previous round: 2013 Yas Marina GP3 Series round	Yas Marina GP3 round	Next round: 2015 Yas Marina GP3 Series round
