= 2015 Sochi GP3 Series round =

(Russia) 2015 Sochi GP3 round
Round details
- Round 7 of 9 rounds in the 2015 GP3 Series
- Layout of the Sochi Autodrom
- Location: Sochi Autodrom; Sochi, Krasnodar Krai, Russia
- Course: Semi-permanent racing facility 5.853 km (3.637 mi)

GP3 Series

Race 1
- Date: 10 October 2015
- Laps: 15

Pole position
Driver	(France) Esteban Ocon	ART Grand Prix
- Time: 1:53.921

Podium
First	(Italy) Luca Ghiotto	Trident
Second	(France) Esteban Ocon	ART Grand Prix
Third	(United Kingdom) Emil Bernstorff	Arden International

Fastest lap
Driver	(France) Esteban Ocon	ART Grand Prix
- Time: 1:52.459 (on lap 14)

Race 2
- Date: 11 October 2015
- Laps: 15

Podium
First	(Sweden) Jimmy Eriksson	Koiranen GP
Second	(France) Esteban Ocon	ART Grand Prix
Third	(United Kingdom) Jann Mardenborough	Carlin

Fastest lap
Driver	(France) Esteban Ocon	ART Grand Prix
- Time: 1:53.189 (on lap 15)

The 2015 Sochi GP3 Series round was a GP3 Series motor race held on October 10 and 11, 2015 at Sochi Autodrom, Russia. It was the seventh round of the 2015 GP3 Series. The race supported the 2015 Russian Grand Prix.

== Classification ==
=== Qualifying ===
Pos	No	Driver	Team	Time	Grid
1	6	(France) Esteban Ocon	ART Grand Prix	1:53.921	1
2	21	(Switzerland) Mathéo Tuscher	Jenzer Motorsport	1:53.961	2
3	14	(Italy) Kevin Ceccon	Arden International	1:54.018	3
4	24	(Spain) Alex Palou	Campos Racing	1:54.061	4
5	2	(United Kingdom) Jann Mardenborough	Carlin	1:54.605	5
6	12	(United Kingdom) Matt Parry	Koiranen GP	1:54.683	9
7	27	(Italy) Luca Ghiotto	Trident	1:54.723	6
8	15	(United Kingdom) Emil Bernstorff	Arden International	1:54.816	7
9	1	(Italy) Antonio Fuoco	Carlin	1:54.933	8
10	7	(United Kingdom) Seb Morris	Status Grand Prix	1:55.352	10
11	26	(Poland) Artur Janosz	Trident	1:55.672	11
12	28	(Italy) Michele Beretta	Trident	1:55.800	12
13	3	(Australia) Mitchell Gilbert	Carlin	1:55.989	13
14	4	(Mexico) Alfonso Celis Jr.	ART Grand Prix	1:56.041	14
15	25	(Russia) Konstantin Tereshchenko	Campos Racing	1:56.218	15
16	5	(Germany) Marvin Kirchhöfer	ART Grand Prix	1:56.273	16
17	11	(Sweden) Jimmy Eriksson	Koiranen GP	1:56.654	17
18	9	(Thailand) Sandy Stuvik	Status Grand Prix	1:56.976	18
19	22	(Switzerland) Ralph Boschung	Jenzer Motorsport	1:57.338	19
20	23	(Kuwait) Zaid Ashkanani	Campos Racing	1:57.856	20
21	10	(Hong Kong) Adderly Fong	Koiranen GP	1:57.881	21
22	8	(Switzerland) Alex Fontana	Status Grand Prix	2:01.180	22
23	16	(Poland) Aleksander Bosak	Arden International	2:01.363	23
24	20	(Norway) Pål Varhaug	Jenzer Motorsport	2:18.891	24

=== Feature Race ===
Pos	No	Driver	Team	Laps	Time/Retired	Grid	Points
1	27	(Italy) Luca Ghiotto	Trident	15	30:38.718	6	25
2	6	(France) Esteban Ocon	ART Grand Prix	15	+1.596	1	18+4+2
3	15	(United Kingdom) Emil Bernstorff	Arden International	15	+8.314	7	15
4	24	(Spain) Alex Palou	Campos Racing	15	+11.019	4	12
5	2	(United Kingdom) Jann Mardenborough	Carlin	15	+12.408	5	10
6	1	(Italy) Antonio Fuoco	Carlin	15	+15.754	8	8
7	12	(United Kingdom) Matt Parry	Koiranen GP	15	+17.597	9	6
8	11	(Sweden) Jimmy Eriksson	Koiranen GP	15	+17.868	17	4
9	5	(Germany) Marvin Kirchhöfer	ART Grand Prix	15	+19.219	16	2
10	26	(Poland) Artur Janosz	Trident	15	+25.889	11	1
11	22	(Switzerland) Ralph Boschung	Jenzer Motorsport	15	+26.496	19	
12	3	(Australia) Mitchell Gilbert	Carlin	15	+27.742	13	
13	4	(Mexico) Alfonso Celis Jr.	ART Grand Prix	15	+28.124	14	
14	7	(United Kingdom) Seb Morris	Status Grand Prix	15	+29.423	10	
15	10	(Hong Kong) Adderly Fong	Koiranen GP	15	+30.861	21	
16	9	(Thailand) Sandy Stuvik	Status Grand Prix	15	+34.560	18	
17	25	(Russia) Konstantin Tereshchenko	Campos Racing	15	+38.739	15	
18	28	(Italy) Michele Beretta	Trident	15	+40.848	12	
19	8	(Switzerland) Alex Fontana	Status Grand Prix	15	+44.050	22	
20	23	(Kuwait) Zaid Ashkanani	Campos Racing	15	+2:20.018	20	
Ret	21	(Switzerland) Mathéo Tuscher	Jenzer Motorsport	1	Retired	2	
Ret	16	(Poland) Aleksander Bosak	Arden International	0	Retired	23	
Ret	20	(Norway) Pål Varhaug	Jenzer Motorsport	0	Retired	24	
Ret	14	(Italy) Kevin Ceccon	Arden International	0	Retired	3	

=== Sprint Race ===
Pos	No	Driver	Team	Laps	Time/Retired	Grid	Points
1	11	(Sweden) Jimmy Eriksson	Koiranen GP	15	28:34.265	1	15
2	6	(France) Esteban Ocon	ART Grand Prix	15	+2.778	7	12+2
3	2	(United Kingdom) Jann Mardenborough	Carlin	15	+4.936	4	10
4	1	(Italy) Antonio Fuoco	Carlin	15	+10.459	3	8
5	26	(Poland) Artur Janosz	Trident	15	+13.005	10	6
6	15	(United Kingdom) Emil Bernstorff	Arden International	15	+15.035	6	4
7	5	(Germany) Marvin Kirchhöfer	ART Grand Prix	15	+15.571	9	2
8	27	(Italy) Luca Ghiotto	Trident	15	+16.289	8	1
9	24	(Spain) Alex Palou	Campos Racing	15	+16.796	5	
10	7	(United Kingdom) Seb Morris	Status Grand Prix	15	+23.284	14	
11	8	(Switzerland) Alex Fontana	Status Grand Prix	15	+27.132	19	
12	4	(Mexico) Alfonso Celis Jr.	ART Grand Prix	15	+27.847	13	
13	28	(Italy) Michele Beretta	Trident	15	+29.822	18	
14	20	(Norway) Pål Varhaug	Jenzer Motorsport	15	+31.864	22	
15	3	(Australia) Mitchell Gilbert	Carlin	15	+33.454	12	
16	25	(Russia) Konstantin Tereshchenko	Campos Racing	15	+37.493	17	
17	9	(Thailand) Sandy Stuvik	Status Grand Prix	15	+44.427	16	
18	10	(Hong Kong) Adderly Fong	Koiranen GP	15	+50.534	15	
19	23	(Kuwait) Zaid Ashkanani	Campos Racing	15	+1:02.503	20	
20	16	(Poland) Aleksander Bosak	Arden International	15	+1:13.910	24	
Ret	21	(Switzerland) Mathéo Tuscher	Jenzer Motorsport	3	Retired	21	
Ret	12	(United Kingdom) Matt Parry	Koiranen GP	1	Retired	2	
DNS	14	(Italy) Kevin Ceccon	Arden International	0	Did not start	23	
DNS	22	(Switzerland) Ralph Boschung	Jenzer Motorsport	0	Did not start	11	

== See also ==
- 2015 Russian Grand Prix
- 2015 Sochi GP2 Series round

Previous round: 2015 Monza GP3 Series round	GP3 Series; 2015 season	Next round: 2015 Bahrain GP3 Series round
Previous round: 2014 Sochi GP3 Series round	Sochi GP3 round	Next round: 2018 Sochi GP3 Series round
