= 2015 Bahrain GP3 Series round =

Motor race

2015 Bahrain GP3 round
Round details
- Round 8 of 9 rounds in the 2015 GP3 Series
- Layout of the Bahrain International Circuit
- Location: Bahrain International Circuit, Sakhir, Bahrain
- Course: Permanent racing facility 5.406 km (3.359 mi)

GP3 Series

Race 1
- Date: 20 November 2015
- Laps: 20

Pole position
Driver	(France) Esteban Ocon	ART Grand Prix
- Time: 1:46.684

Podium
First	(Germany) Marvin Kirchhöfer	ART Grand Prix
Second	(United Kingdom) Emil Bernstorff	Arden International
Third	(France) Esteban Ocon	ART Grand Prix

Fastest lap
Driver	(Italy) Luca Ghiotto	Trident
- Time: 1:49.958 (on lap 6)

Race 2
- Date: 21 November 2015
- Laps: 15

Podium
First	(Italy) Luca Ghiotto	Trident
Second	(France) Esteban Ocon	ART Grand Prix
Third	(United Kingdom) Matt Parry	Koiranen GP

Fastest lap
Driver	(Italy) Luca Ghiotto	Trident
- Time: 1:48.228 (on lap 6)

The 2015 Bahrain GP3 Series round was a GP3 Series motor race held on November 20 and 21, 2015 at Bahrain International Circuit, Bahrain. It was the eighth and penultimate round of the 2015 GP3 Series. The race supported the 2015 6 Hours of Bahrain.

== Classification ==
=== Qualifying ===
Pos	No	Driver	Team	Time	Grid
1	6	(France) Esteban Ocon	ART Grand Prix	1:46.684	1
2	27	(Italy) Luca Ghiotto	Trident	1:47.188	2
3	14	(Italy) Kevin Ceccon	Arden International	1:47.197	3
4	24	(Spain) Álex Palou	Campos Racing	1:47.218	4
5	5	(Germany) Marvin Kirchhöfer	ART Grand Prix	1:47.259	5
6	26	(Poland) Artur Janosz	Trident	1:47.618	6
7	15	(United Kingdom) Emil Bernstorff	Arden International	1:47.663	7
8	2	(United Kingdom) Jann Mardenborough	Carlin	1:47.686	8
9	11	(Sweden) Jimmy Eriksson	Koiranen GP	1:47.713	9
10	1	(Italy) Antonio Fuoco	Carlin	1:47.833	10
11	8	(Switzerland) Alex Fontana	Status Grand Prix	1:47.944	11
12	22	(Switzerland) Ralph Boschung	Jenzer Motorsport	1:47.947	12
13	3	(Australia) Mitchell Gilbert	Carlin	1:47.954	13
14	4	(Mexico) Alfonso Celis Jr.	ART Grand Prix	1:48.103	14
15	20	(Norway) Pål Varhaug	Jenzer Motorsport	1:48.109	15
16	7	(United Kingdom) Seb Morris	Status Grand Prix	1:48.265	16
17	28	(Italy) Michele Beretta	Trident	1:48.290	17
18	12	(United Kingdom) Matt Parry	Koiranen GP	1:48.304	18
19	21	(Switzerland) Mathéo Tuscher	Jenzer Motorsport	1:48.314	19
20	16	(Poland) Aleksander Bosak	Arden International	1:48.359	20
21	10	(Russia) Matevos Isaakyan	Koiranen GP	1:48.576	21
22	23	(Kuwait) Zaid Ashkanani	Campos Racing	1:48.775	22
23	9	(Thailand) Sandy Stuvik	Status Grand Prix	1:48.815	23
24	25	(Russia) Konstantin Tereshchenko	Campos Racing	1:48.946	24

=== Feature Race ===
Pos	No	Driver	Team	Laps	Time/Retired	Grid	Points
1	5	(Germany) Marvin Kirchhöfer	ART Grand Prix	20	37:11.554	5	25
2	15	(United Kingdom) Emil Bernstorff	Arden International	20	+1.546	7	18
3	6	(France) Esteban Ocon	ART Grand Prix	20	+2.756	1	15+4
4	27	(Italy) Luca Ghiotto	Trident	20	+5.677	2	12+2
5	11	(Sweden) Jimmy Eriksson	Koiranen GP	20	+10.417	9	10
6	26	(Poland) Artur Janosz	Trident	20	+13.323	6	8
7	2	(United Kingdom) Jann Mardenborough	Carlin	20	+13.843	8	6
8	4	(Mexico) Alfonso Celis Jr.	ART Grand Prix	20	+16.288	14	4
9	1	(Italy) Antonio Fuoco	Carlin	20	+18.186	10	2
10	22	(Switzerland) Ralph Boschung	Jenzer Motorsport	20	+18.900	12	1
11	12	(United Kingdom) Matt Parry	Koiranen GP	20	+23.610	18	
12	21	(Switzerland) Mathéo Tuscher	Jenzer Motorsport	20	+28.950	19	
13	9	(Thailand) Sandy Stuvik	Status Grand Prix	20	+31.816	23	
14	14	(Italy) Kevin Ceccon	Arden International	20	+31.916	3	
15	3	(Australia) Mitchell Gilbert	Carlin	20	+37.328	13	
16	7	(United Kingdom) Seb Morris	Status Grand Prix	20	+37.893	16	
17	23	(Kuwait) Zaid Ashkanani	Campos Racing	20	+40.218	22	
18	25	(Russia) Konstantin Tereshchenko	Campos Racing	20	+50.428	24	
19	8	(Switzerland) Alex Fontana	Status Grand Prix	20	+52.639	11	
20	28	(Italy) Michele Beretta	Trident	19	+1 lap	17	
Ret	20	(Norway) Pål Varhaug	Jenzer Motorsport	14	Retired	15	
Ret	10	(Russia) Matevos Isaakyan	Koiranen GP	13	Retired	21	
Ret	24	(Spain) Álex Palou	Campos Racing	1	Retired	4	
Ret	16	(Poland) Aleksander Bosak	Arden International	1	Retired	20	

=== Sprint Race ===
Pos	No	Driver	Team	Laps	Time/Retired	Grid	Points
1	27	(Italy) Luca Ghiotto	Trident	15	42:51.074	5	15+2
2	6	(France) Esteban Ocon	ART Grand Prix	15	+2.370	6	12
3	12	(United Kingdom) Matt Parry	Koiranen GP	15	+9.193	11	10
4	15	(United Kingdom) Emil Bernstorff	Arden International	15	+13.550	7	8
5	1	(Italy) Antonio Fuoco	Carlin	15	+14.242	9	6
6	5	(Germany) Marvin Kirchhöfer	ART Grand Prix	15	+14.361	8	4
7	11	(Sweden) Jimmy Eriksson	Koiranen GP	15	+16.248	4	2
8	4	(Mexico) Alfonso Celis Jr.	ART Grand Prix	15	+17.677	1	1
9	22	(Switzerland) Ralph Boschung	Jenzer Motorsport	15	+18.267	10	
10	24	(Spain) Álex Palou	Campos Racing	15	+19.364	24	
11	3	(Australia) Mitchell Gilbert	Carlin	15	+22.606	15	
12	26	(Poland) Artur Janosz	Trident	15	+27.560	3	
13	23	(Kuwait) Zaid Ashkanani	Campos Racing	15	+27.602	17	
14	10	(Russia) Matevos Isaakyan	Koiranen GP	15	+29.797	22	
15	28	(Italy) Michele Beretta	Trident	15	+31.373	20	
16	16	(Poland) Aleksander Bosak	Arden International	15	+31.687	23	
17	25	(Russia) Konstantin Tereshchenko	Campos Racing	15	+34.310	18	
18	14	(Italy) Kevin Ceccon	Arden International	15	+47.601	14	
19	8	(Switzerland) Alex Fontana	Status Grand Prix	15	+55.934	19	
Ret	7	(United Kingdom) Seb Morris	Status Grand Prix	1	Retired	16	
Ret	2	(United Kingdom) Jann Mardenborough	Carlin	0	Retired	2	
Ret	9	(Thailand) Sandy Stuvik	Status Grand Prix	0	Retired	13	
Ret	20	(Norway) Pål Varhaug	Jenzer Motorsport	0	Retired	21	
Ret	21	(Switzerland) Mathéo Tuscher	Jenzer Motorsport	0	Retired	12	

== See also ==
- 2015 6 Hours of Bahrain
- 2015 Bahrain 2nd GP2 Series round

Previous round: 2015 Sochi GP3 Series round	GP3 Series; 2015 season	Next round: 2015 Yas Marina GP3 Series round
Previous round: none	Bahrain GP3 round	Next round: 2022 Sakhir Formula 3 round
