= 2015 Catalunya GP3 Series round =

Motor racing competition

(Spain) 2015 Catalunya GP3 round
Round details
- Round 1 of 9 rounds in the 2015 GP3 Series
- Layout of the Circuit de Catalunya
- Location: Circuit de Catalunya; Montmeló, Spain
- Course: Permanent racing facility 4.665 km (2.892 mi)

GP3 Series

Race 1
- Date: 9 May 2015
- Laps: 22

Pole position
Driver	(Italy) Luca Ghiotto	Trident
- Time: 1:35.469

Podium
First	(France) Esteban Ocon	ART Grand Prix
Second	(Italy) Luca Ghiotto	Trident
Third	(United Kingdom) Emil Bernstorff	Arden International

Fastest lap
Driver	(France) Esteban Ocon	ART Grand Prix
- Time: 1:38.997 (on lap 2)

Race 2
- Date: 10 May 2015
- Laps: 17

Podium
First	(Germany) Marvin Kirchhöfer	ART Grand Prix
Second	(Sweden) Jimmy Eriksson	Koiranen GP
Third	(United Kingdom) Jann Mardenborough	Carlin

Fastest lap
Driver	(Germany) Marvin Kirchhöfer	ART Grand Prix
- Time: 1:38.197 (on lap 2)

The 2015 Catalunya GP3 Series round was a GP3 Series motor race held on May 9 and 10, 2015 at Circuit de Catalunya, Montmeló, Spain. It was the first round of the 2015 GP3 Series. The race supported the 2015 Spanish Grand Prix.

Luca Ghiotto took pole position and Esteban Ocon took the victory in the feature race, while Marvin Kirchhöfer took the victory in the sprint race.

== Classification ==
=== Qualifying ===
Pos	No	Driver	Team	Time	Grid
1	27	(Italy) Luca Ghiotto	Trident	1:35.469	1
2	6	(France) Esteban Ocon	ART Grand Prix	1:35.608	2
3	15	(United Kingdom) Emil Bernstorff	Arden International	1:35.800	3
4	24	(Spain) Álex Palou	Campos Racing	1:35.846	4
5	21	(Switzerland) Mathéo Tuscher	Jenzer Motorsport	1:35.909	5
6	5	(Germany) Marvin Kirchhöfer	ART Grand Prix	1:35.934	6
7	4	(Mexico) Alfonso Celis Jr.	ART Grand Prix	1:35.943	7
8	28	(Colombia) Óscar Tunjo	Trident	1:36.047	8
9	20	(Norway) Pål Varhaug	Jenzer Motorsport	1:36.082	9
10	11	(Sweden) Jimmy Eriksson	Koiranen GP	1:36.134	10
11	3	(Australia) Mitchell Gilbert	Carlin	1:36.143	11
12	22	(Switzerland) Ralph Boschung	Jenzer Motorsport	1:36.160	12
13	10	(Hong Kong) Adderly Fong	Koiranen GP	1:36.213	13
14	8	(Switzerland) Alex Fontana	Status Grand Prix	1:36.284	14
15	2	(United Kingdom) Jann Mardenborough	Carlin	1:36.305	15
16	12	(United Kingdom) Matt Parry	Koiranen GP	1:36.403	16
17	26	(Poland) Artur Janosz	Trident	1:36.478	17
18	9	(Thailand) Sandy Stuvik	Status Grand Prix	1:36.534	18
19	14	(Italy) Kevin Ceccon	Arden International	1:36.593	19
20	7	(United Kingdom) Seb Morris	Status Grand Prix	1:36.634	20
21	1	(Italy) Antonio Fuoco	Carlin	1:36.785	21
22	23	(Kuwait) Zaid Ashkanani	Campos Racing	1:37.288	22
23	16	(Poland) Aleksander Bosak	Arden International	1:37.549	23
24	25	(Venezuela) Samin Gómez	Campos Racing	1:38.409	24

=== Feature Race ===
Pos	No	Driver	Team	Laps	Time/Retired	Grid	Points
1	6	(France) Esteban Ocon	ART Grand Prix	22	39:27.125	2	25+2
2	27	(Italy) Luca Ghiotto	Trident	22	+3.368	1	18+4
3	15	(United Kingdom) Emil Bernstorff	Arden International	22	+3.509	3	15
4	2	(United Kingdom) Jann Mardenborough	Carlin	22	+14.456	15	12
5	5	(Germany) Marvin Kirchhöfer	ART Grand Prix	22	+18.771	6	10
6	11	(Sweden) Jimmy Eriksson	Koiranen GP	22	+22.621	10	8
7	14	(Italy) Kevin Ceccon	Arden International	22	+23.386	19	6
8	1	(Italy) Antonio Fuoco	Carlin	22	+23.919	21	4
9	8	(Switzerland) Alex Fontana	Status Grand Prix	22	+25.532	14	2
10	4	(Mexico) Alfonso Celis Jr.	ART Grand Prix	22	+30.304	7	1
11	23	(Kuwait) Zaid Ashkanani	Campos Racing	22	+30.383	22	
12	24	(Spain) Álex Palou	Campos Racing	22	+30.529	4	
13	12	(United Kingdom) Matt Parry	Koiranen GP	22	+30.680	16	
14	21	(Switzerland) Mathéo Tuscher	Jenzer Motorsport	22	+32.026	5	
15	26	(Poland) Artur Janosz	Trident	22	+32.555	17	
16	28	(Colombia) Óscar Tunjo	Trident	22	+34.642	8	
17	10	(Hong Kong) Adderly Fong	Koiranen GP	22	+35.972	13	
18	9	(Thailand) Sandy Stuvik	Status Grand Prix	22	+36.967	18	
19	16	(Poland) Aleksander Bosak	Arden International	22	+40.274	23	
20	25	(Venezuela) Samin Gómez	Campos Racing	22	+46.219	24	
21	20	(Norway) Pål Varhaug	Jenzer Motorsport	22	+51.827	9	
22	3	(Australia) Mitchell Gilbert	Carlin	21	+1 lap	11	
Ret	7	(United Kingdom) Seb Morris	Status Grand Prix	10	Retired	20	
Ret	22	(Switzerland) Ralph Boschung	Jenzer Motorsport	10	Retired	12	

=== Sprint Race ===
Pos	No	Driver	Team	Laps	Time/Retired	Grid	Points
1	5	(Germany) Marvin Kirchhöfer	ART Grand Prix	17	28:35.765	4	15+2
2	11	(Sweden) Jimmy Eriksson	Koiranen GP	17	+6.724	3	12
3	2	(United Kingdom) Jann Mardenborough	Carlin	17	+7.116	5	10
4	1	(Italy) Antonio Fuoco	Carlin	17	+9.654	1	8
5	15	(United Kingdom) Emil Bernstorff	Arden International	17	+10.417	6	6
6	14	(Italy) Kevin Ceccon	Arden International	17	+11.436	2	4
7	6	(France) Esteban Ocon	ART Grand Prix	17	+11.613	8	2
8	27	(Italy) Luca Ghiotto	Trident	17	+15.860	7	1
9	12	(United Kingdom) Matt Parry	Koiranen GP	17	+17.190	13	
10	4	(Mexico) Alfonso Celis Jr.	ART Grand Prix	17	+19.160	10	
11	28	(Colombia) Óscar Tunjo	Trident	17	+24.640	16	
12	26	(Poland) Artur Janosz	Trident	17	+28.589	15	
13	21	(Switzerland) Mathéo Tuscher	Jenzer Motorsport	17	+36.330	14	
14	22	(Switzerland) Ralph Boschung	Jenzer Motorsport	17	+36.780	24	
15	23	(Kuwait) Zaid Ashkanani	Campos Racing	17	+37.061	11	
16	8	(Switzerland) Alex Fontana	Status Grand Prix	17	+37.821	9	
17	9	(Thailand) Sandy Stuvik	Status Grand Prix	17	+38.377	18	
18	20	(Norway) Pål Varhaug	Jenzer Motorsport	17	+38.796	21	
19	25	(Venezuela) Samin Gómez	Campos Racing	17	+39.098	20	
20	24	(Spain) Álex Palou	Campos Racing	17	+39.631	12	
21	10	(Hong Kong) Adderly Fong	Koiranen GP	17	+41.348	3	
22	3	(Australia) Mitchell Gilbert	Carlin	17	+46.872	22	
23	16	(Poland) Aleksander Bosak	Arden International	17	+48.233	19	
24	7	(United Kingdom) Seb Morris	Status Grand Prix	17	+48.564	23	

== See also ==
- 2015 Spanish Grand Prix
- 2015 Catalunya GP2 Series round

Previous round: 2014 Yas Marina GP3 Series round	GP3 Series; 2015 season	Next round: 2015 Red Bull Ring GP3 Series round
Previous round: 2014 Catalunya GP3 Series round	Catalunya GP3 round	Next round: 2016 Catalunya GP3 Series round
