= 2015 Monza GP3 Series round =

GP3 series motor race

(Italy) 2015 Monza GP3 round
Round details
- Round 6 of 9 rounds in the 2015 GP3 Series
- Layout of the Autodromo Nazionale Monza
- Location: Autodromo Nazionale Monza, Monza, Italy
- Course: Permanent racing facility 5.793 km (3.600 mi)

GP3 Series

Race 1
- Date: 5 September 2015
- Laps: 22

Pole position
Driver	(Italy) Luca Ghiotto	Trident
- Time: 1:50.007

Podium
First	(United Kingdom) Emil Bernstorff	Arden International
Second	(France) Esteban Ocon	ART Grand Prix
Third	(Italy) Kevin Ceccon	Arden International

Fastest lap
Driver	(United Kingdom) Emil Bernstorff	Arden International
- Time: 1:39.935 (on lap 13)

Race 2
- Date: 6 September 2015
- Laps: 16

Podium
First	(Germany) Marvin Kirchhöfer	ART Grand Prix
Second	(France) Esteban Ocon	ART Grand Prix
Third	(Italy) Luca Ghiotto	Trident

Fastest lap
Driver	(Italy) Luca Ghiotto	Trident
- Time: 1:39.146 (on lap 4)

The 2015 Monza GP3 Series round was a GP3 Series motor race held on September 5 and 6, 2015 at Autodromo Nazionale Monza, Italy. It was the sixth round of the 2015 GP3 Series. The race supported the 2015 Italian Grand Prix.

== Classification ==
=== Qualifying ===
Pos.	No.	Driver	Team	Time	Grid
1	27	(Italy) Luca Ghiotto	Trident	1:50.007	1
2	6	(France) Esteban Ocon	ART Grand Prix	1:51.007	2
3	12	(United Kingdom) Matt Parry	Koiranen GP	1:51.292	3
4	14	(Italy) Kevin Ceccon	Arden International	1:51.415	4
5	15	(United Kingdom) Emil Bernstorff	Arden International	1:51.428	5
6	5	(Germany) Marvin Kirchhöfer	ART Grand Prix	1:51.442	6
7	24	(Spain) Álex Palou	Campos Racing	1:51.452	7
8	1	(Italy) Antonio Fuoco	Carlin	1:51.720	8
9	7	(United Kingdom) Seb Morris	Status Grand Prix	1:51.723	9
10	11	(Sweden) Jimmy Eriksson	Koiranen GP	1:51.748	10
11	26	(Poland) Artur Janosz	Trident	1:51.806	11
12	21	(Switzerland) Mathéo Tuscher	Jenzer Motorsport	1:51.813	12
13	28	(France) Amaury Bonduel	Trident	1:52.048	13
14	9	(Thailand) Sandy Stuvik	Status Grand Prix	1:52.095	14
15	20	(Norway) Pål Varhaug	Jenzer Motorsport	1:52.219	15
16	23	(Kuwait) Zaid Ashkanani	Campos Racing	1:52.373	16
17	8	(Switzerland) Alex Fontana	Status Grand Prix	1:52.383	17
18	3	(Australia) Mitchell Gilbert	Carlin	1:52.501	18
19	25	(France) Brandon Maïsano	Campos Racing	1:52.653	19
20	16	(Poland) Aleksander Bosak	Arden International	1:54.052	20
21	22	(Switzerland) Ralph Boschung	Jenzer Motorsport		21

=== Feature race ===
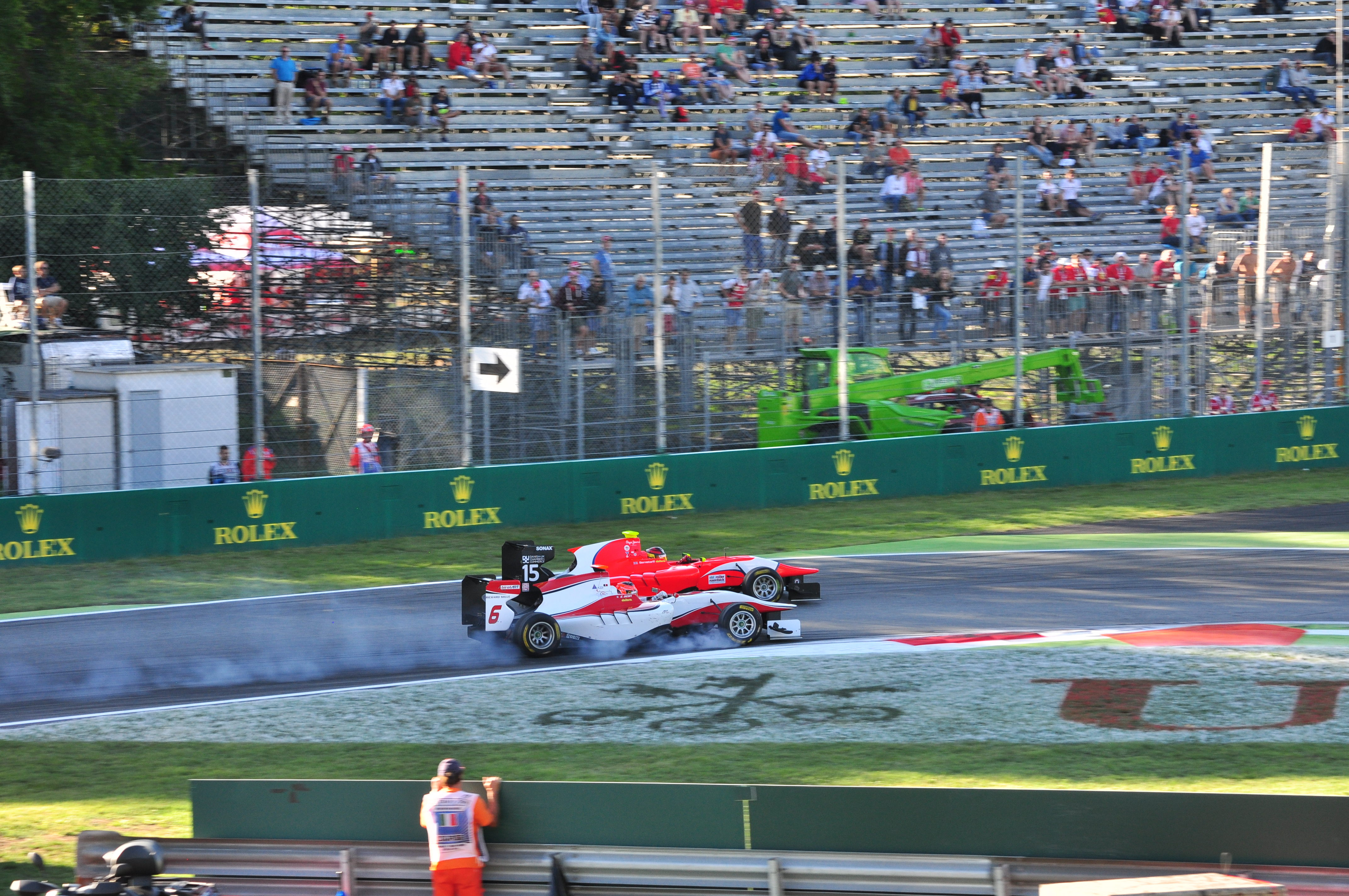
Emil Bernstorff and Esteban Ocon

Pos.	No.	Driver	Team	Laps	Time/Retired	Grid	Points
1	15	(United Kingdom) Emil Bernstorff	Arden International	22	37:06.696	5	25+2
2	6	(France) Esteban Ocon	ART Grand Prix	22	+0.987	2	18
3	14	(Italy) Kevin Ceccon	Arden International	22	+2.374	4	15
4	5	(Germany) Marvin Kirchhöfer	ART Grand Prix	22	+6.555	6	12
5	11	(Sweden) Jimmy Eriksson	Koiranen GP	22	+9.206	10	10
6	21	(Switzerland) Mathéo Tuscher	Jenzer Motorsport	22	+15.249	12	8
7	24	(Spain) Álex Palou	Campos Racing	22	+16.408	7	6
8	8	(Switzerland) Alex Fontana	Status Grand Prix	22	+22.645	17	4
9	22	(Switzerland) Ralph Boschung	Jenzer Motorsport	22	+23.891	21	2
10	3	(Australia) Mitchell Gilbert	Carlin	22	+25.038	18	1
11	9	(Thailand) Sandy Stuvik	Status Grand Prix	22	+25.365	14	
12	25	(France) Brandon Maïsano	Campos Racing	22	+28.401	19	
13	23	(Kuwait) Zaid Ashkanani	Campos Racing	22	+31.703	16	
14	28	(France) Amaury Bonduel	Trident	22	+38.943	13	
15	16	(Poland) Aleksander Bosak	Arden International	22	+1:09.130	20	
16	26	(Poland) Artur Janosz	Trident	20	+2 lap	11	
Ret	1	(Italy) Antonio Fuoco	Carlin	1	Retired	8	
Ret	20	(Norway) Pål Varhaug	Jenzer Motorsport	1	Retired	15	
Ret	27	(Italy) Luca Ghiotto	Trident	0	Retired	1	4
DSQ	7	(United Kingdom) Seb Morris	Status Grand Prix	22	Disqualified	9	
DSQ	12	(United Kingdom) Matt Parry	Koiranen GP	22	Disqualified	3	

=== Sprint race ===
Pos.	No.	Driver	Team	Laps	Time/Retired	Grid	Points
1	5	(Germany) Marvin Kirchhöfer	ART Grand Prix	16	26:50.969	5	15
2	6	(France) Esteban Ocon	ART Grand Prix	16	+1.211	7	12
3	27	(Italy) Luca Ghiotto	Trident	16	+1.459	19	10+2
4	14	(Italy) Kevin Ceccon	Arden International	16	+2.041	6	8
5	11	(Sweden) Jimmy Eriksson	Koiranen GP	16	+6.759	4	6
6	21	(Switzerland) Mathéo Tuscher	Jenzer Motorsport	16	+11.718	3	4
7	22	(Switzerland) Ralph Boschung	Jenzer Motorsport	16	+13.418	9	2
8	9	(Thailand) Sandy Stuvik	Status Grand Prix	16	+15.754	11	1
9	3	(Australia) Mitchell Gilbert	Carlin	16	+17.303	10	
10	24	(Spain) Álex Palou	Campos Racing	16	+17.794	2	
11	1	(Italy) Antonio Fuoco	Carlin	16	+18.069	17	
12	28	(France) Amaury Bonduel	Trident	16	+19.512	14	
13	25	(France) Brandon Maïsano	Campos Racing	16	+20.484	12	
14	20	(Norway) Pål Varhaug	Jenzer Motorsport	16	+20.571	18	
15	23	(Kuwait) Zaid Ashkanani	Campos Racing	16	+21.748	13	
16	8	(Switzerland) Alex Fontana	Status Grand Prix	16	+25.399	1	
Ret	15	(United Kingdom) Emil Bernstorff	Arden International	9	Retired	8	
Ret	26	(Poland) Artur Janosz	Trident	2	Retired	16	
Ret	7	(United Kingdom) Seb Morris	Status Grand Prix	1	Retired	20	
Ret	16	(Poland) Aleksander Bosak	Arden International	0	Retired	15	
Ret	12	(United Kingdom) Matt Parry	Koiranen GP	0	Retired	21	

== See also ==
- 2015 Italian Grand Prix
- 2015 Monza GP2 Series round

Previous round: 2015 Spa-Francorchamps GP3 Series round	GP3 Series; 2015 season	Next round: 2015 Sochi GP3 Series round
Previous round: 2014 Monza GP3 Series round	Monza GP3 round	Next round: 2016 Monza GP3 Series round
