= 2014 Monza GP3 Series round =

Motor sport competition

(Italy) 2014 Monza GP3 round
Round details
- Round 7 of 9 rounds in the 2014 GP3 Series
- Layout of the Autodromo Nazionale Monza
- Location: Autodromo Nazionale Monza, Monza, Italy
- Course: Permanent racing facility 5.793 km (3.600 mi)

GP3 Series

Race 1
- Date: 6 September 2014
- Laps: 17

Pole position
Driver	(Sweden) Jimmy Eriksson	Koiranen GP
- Time: 1:38.195

Podium
First	(Sweden) Jimmy Eriksson	Koiranen GP
Second	(United Kingdom) Dino Zamparelli	ART Grand Prix
Third	(Germany) Marvin Kirchhöfer	ART Grand Prix

Fastest lap
Driver	(United Kingdom) Dino Zamparelli	ART Grand Prix
- Time: 1:39.979 (on lap 14)

Race 2
- Date: 7 September 2014
- Laps: 17

Podium
First	(United Kingdom) Dean Stoneman	Marussia Manor Racing
Second	(United Kingdom) Alex Lynn	Carlin
Third	(Germany) Marvin Kirchhöfer	ART Grand Prix

Fastest lap
Driver	(Germany) Marvin Kirchhöfer	ART Grand Prix
- Time: 2:07.448 (on lap 13)

The 2014 Monza GP3 Series round was a GP3 Series motor race held on September 6 and 7, 2014 at Autodromo Nazionale Monza, Italy. It was the seventh round of the 2014 GP3 Series. The race supported the 2014 Italian Grand Prix.

== Classification ==
=== Summary ===
There were changes to the lineup at Trident before the race weekend: Mitchell Gilbert returned to the team, and Luca Ghiotto switched to the #23 car to replace Konstantin Tereshchenko.

Jimmy Eriksson qualified on pole position. He held the lead at the start, and although Dino Zamparelli reduced the gap to under a second on the penultimate lap, he was unable to pass, giving Eriksson is second win of the season. The win gave Eriksson some much-needed championship points, closing the gap to Alex Lynn and Richie Stanaway. Marvin Kirchhöfer finished third to make it a 2-3 result for ART Grand Prix.

Mathéo Tuscher and Patrick Kujala started on the front row for race 2. It was the second row starters, however, that got the better start, with Dean Stoneman leading from Lynn. Lynn briefly took the lead on lap 4, but Stoneman was quick to pass him again, and he held the lead until the end, taking his third win of the season. Stanaway retired with a mechanical failure, which extended Lynn's championship lead to fifty points.

=== Qualifying ===
Pos.	No.	Driver	Team	Time	Grid
1	8	(Sweden) Jimmy Eriksson	Koiranen GP	1:38.195	1
2	3	(United Kingdom) Dino Zamparelli	ART Grand Prix	1:38.503	2
3	26	(United Kingdom) Nick Yelloly	Status Grand Prix	1:38.536	3
4	11	(United Kingdom) Emil Bernstorff	Carlin	1:38.611	4
5	27	(New Zealand) Richie Stanaway	Status Grand Prix	1:38.636	5
6	10	(United Kingdom) Alex Lynn	Carlin	1:38.667	6
7	4	(Romania) Robert Vișoiu	Arden International	1:38.668	7
8	2	(Germany) Marvin Kirchhöfer	ART Grand Prix	1:38.680	8
9	14	(Finland) Patrick Kujala	Marussia Manor Racing	1:38.682	9
10	16	(United Kingdom) Dean Stoneman	Marussia Manor Racing	1:38.685	10
11	21	(Switzerland) Mathéo Tuscher	Jenzer Motorsport	1:38.714	11
12	1	(Switzerland) Alex Fontana	ART Grand Prix	1:38.776	12
13	6	(United Kingdom) Jann Mardenborough	Arden International	1:38.788	13
14	22	(Italy) Kevin Ceccon	Jenzer Motorsport	1:38.931	14
15	20	(Norway) Pål Varhaug	Jenzer Motorsport	1:38.998	15
16	25	(Australia) Mitchell Gilbert	Trident	1:39.130	16
17	5	(Switzerland) Patric Niederhauser	Arden International	1:39.245	17
18	18	(Canada) Nelson Mason	Hilmer Motorsport	1:39.260	18
19	23	(Italy) Luca Ghiotto	Trident	1:39.299	19
20	12	(Macau) Luís Sá Silva	Carlin	1:39.303	20
21	24	(Sweden) John Bryant-Meisner	Trident	1:39.323	21
22	19	(Italy) Riccardo Agostini	Hilmer Motorsport	1:39.353	22
23	28	(Mexico) Alfonso Celis Jr.	Status Grand Prix	1:39.364	23
24	15	(United Kingdom) Ryan Cullen	Marussia Manor Racing	1:39.412	24
25	9	(Uruguay) Santiago Urrutia	Koiranen GP	1:39.599	25
26	17	(Germany) Sebastian Balthasar	Hilmer Motorsport	1:39.674	26
27	7	(Spain) Carmen Jordá	Koiranen GP	1:41.413	27

=== Feature race ===
Pos.	No.	Driver	Team	Laps	Time/Retired	Grid	Points
1	8	(Sweden) Jimmy Eriksson	Koiranen GP	17	28:35.462	1	25+4
2	3	(United Kingdom) Dino Zamparelli	ART Grand Prix	17	+0.674	2	18+2
3	2	(Germany) Marvin Kirchhöfer	ART Grand Prix	17	+6.329	8	15
4	11	(United Kingdom) Emil Bernstorff	Carlin	17	+7.380	4	12
5	16	(United Kingdom) Dean Stoneman	Marussia Manor Racing	17	+8.287	10	10
6	10	(United Kingdom) Alex Lynn	Carlin	17	+9.107	6	8
7	14	(Finland) Patrick Kujala	Marussia Manor Racing	17	+10.776	9	6
8	21	(Switzerland) Mathéo Tuscher	Jenzer Motorsport	17	+11.805	11	4
9	27	(New Zealand) Richie Stanaway	Status Grand Prix	17	+12.647	5	2
10	26	(United Kingdom) Nick Yelloly	Status Grand Prix	17	+13.438	3	1
11	6	(United Kingdom) Jann Mardenborough	Arden International	17	+13.556	13	
12	22	(Italy) Kevin Ceccon	Jenzer Motorsport	17	+16.625	14	
13	5	(Switzerland) Patric Niederhauser	Arden International	17	+17.404	17	
14	12	(Macau) Luís Sá Silva	Carlin	17	+18.024	20	
15	19	(Italy) Riccardo Agostini	Hilmer Motorsport	17	+18.180	22	
16	28	(Mexico) Alfonso Celis Jr.	Status Grand Prix	17	+21.308	23	
17	24	(Sweden) John Bryant-Meisner	Trident	17	+31.499	21	
18	25	(Australia) Mitchell Gilbert	Trident	17	+37.864	16	
19	4	(Romania) Robert Vișoiu	Arden International	17	+40.537	7	
20	7	(Spain) Carmen Jordá	Koiranen GP	17	+1:15.351	27	
21	23	(Italy) Luca Ghiotto	Trident	16	+1 lap	19	
Ret	1	(Switzerland) Alex Fontana	ART Grand Prix	12	Retired	12	
Ret	15	(United Kingdom) Ryan Cullen	Marussia Manor Racing	7	Retired	24	
Ret	9	(Uruguay) Santiago Urrutia	Koiranen GP	3	Retired	25	
Ret	17	(Germany) Sebastian Balthasar	Hilmer Motorsport	2	Retired	26	
Ret	20	(Norway) Pål Varhaug	Jenzer Motorsport	0	Retired	15	
DNS	18	(Canada) Nelson Mason	Hilmer Motorsport	0	Did not start	18	
Fastest lap: Dino Zamparelli (ART Grand Prix) — 1:39.979 (on lap 14)

=== Sprint race ===
Pos.	No.	Driver	Team	Laps	Time/Retired	Grid	Points
1	16	(United Kingdom) Dean Stoneman	Marussia Manor Racing	17	28:27.813	4	15
2	10	(United Kingdom) Alex Lynn	Carlin	17	+0.908	3	12
3	2	(Germany) Marvin Kirchhöfer	ART Grand Prix	17	+3.399	6	10+2
4	11	(United Kingdom) Emil Bernstorff	Carlin	17	+4.321	5	8
5	26	(United Kingdom) Nick Yelloly	Status Grand Prix	17	+7.472	10	6
6	22	(Italy) Kevin Ceccon	Jenzer Motorsport	17	+9.774	12	4
7	12	(Macau) Luís Sá Silva	Carlin	17	+18.900	14	2
8	8	(Sweden) Jimmy Eriksson	Koiranen GP	17	+19.759	8	1
9	3	(United Kingdom) Dino Zamparelli	ART Grand Prix	17	+21.007	7	
10	1	(Switzerland) Alex Fontana	ART Grand Prix	17	+21.513	22	
11	20	(Norway) Pål Varhaug	Jenzer Motorsport	17	+21.582	25	
12	19	(Italy) Ricardo Agostini	Hilmer Motorsport	17	+21.893	15	
13	23	(Italy) Luca Ghiotto	Trident	17	+22.337	21	
14	4	(Romania) Robert Vișoiu	Arden International	17	+23.169	19	
15	9	(Uruguay) Santiago Urrutia	Koiranen GP	17	+24.124	24	
16	15	(United Kingdom) Ryan Cullen	Marussia Manor Racing	17	+24.853	23	
18	18	(Canada) Nelson Mason	Hilmer Motorsport	17	+27.786	26	
19	5	(Switzerland) Patric Niederhauser	Arden International	17	+31.820	13	
20	25	(Australia) Mitchell Gilbert	Trident	17	+49.962	18	
21	7	(Spain) Carmen Jordá	Koiranen GP	17	+55.598	20	
Ret	6	(United Kingdom) Jann Mardenborough	Arden International	14	Retired	11	
Ret	27	(New Zealand) Richie Stanaway	Status Grand Prix	14	Retired	9	
Ret	28	(Mexico) Alfonso Celis Jr.	Status Grand Prix	7	Retired	16	
Ret	21	(Switzerland) Mathéo Tuscher	Jenzer Motorsport	5	Retired	1	
Ret	14	(Finland) Patrick Kujala	Marussia Manor Racing	4	Retired	2	
Fastest lap: Marvin Kirchhöfer (ART Grand Prix) — 1:39.557 (on lap 7)

== Standings after the round ==
Drivers' Championship standings

	Pos.	Driver	Points
	1	(United Kingdom) Alex Lynn	173
	2	(New Zealand) Richie Stanaway	123
2	3	(Sweden) Jimmy Eriksson	115
	4	(United Kingdom) Emil Bernstorff	111
2	5	(Germany) Marvin Kirchhöfer	107

Teams' Championship standings

	Pos.	Team	Points
	1	(United Kingdom) Carlin	290
1	2	(France) ART Grand Prix	228
1	3	(Canada) Status Grand Prix	225
	4	(United Kingdom) Arden International	120
	5	(United Kingdom) Marussia Manor Racing	117

- Note: Only the top five positions are included for both sets of standings.

== See also ==
- 2014 Italian Grand Prix
- 2014 Monza GP2 Series round

Previous round: 2014 Spa-Francorchamps GP3 Series round	GP3 Series; 2014 season	Next round: 2014 Sochi GP3 Series round
Previous round: 2013 Monza GP3 Series round	Monza GP3 round	Next round: 2015 Monza GP3 Series round
