= Luca Ghiotto =

Italian racing driver (born 1995)

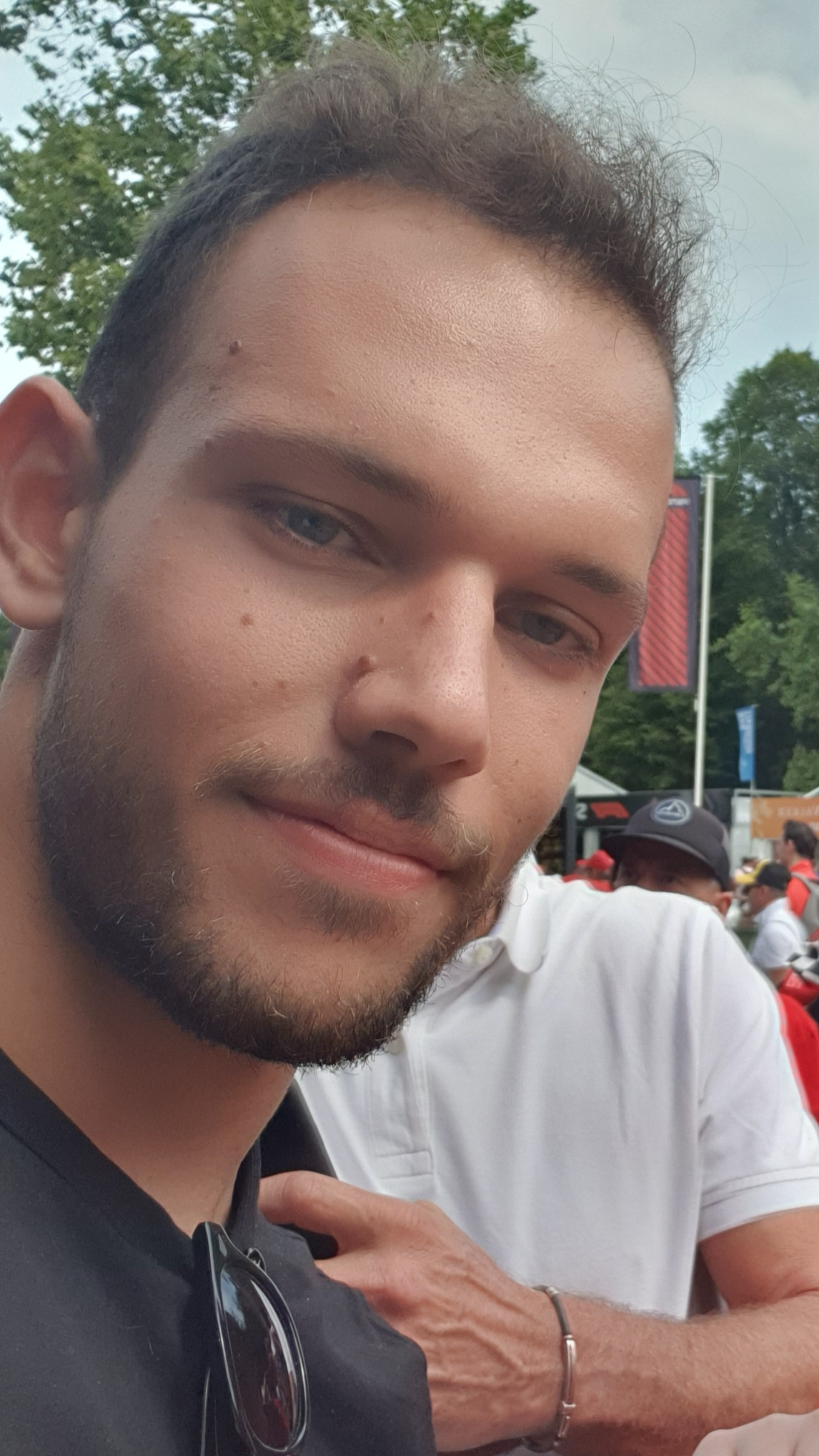
- Ghiotto in 2019
- Nationality: (Italy) Italian
- Born: 24 February 1995 (age 31) Arzignano, Veneto, Italy

European Le Mans Series career
- Debut season: 2024
- Current team: Inter Europol Competition
- Categorisation: FIA Platinum
- Car number: 34
- Starts: 12 (12 entries)
- Wins: 0
- Podiums: 1
- Poles: 0
- Fastest laps: 1
- Best finish: 7th in 2024

IndyCar Series career
- 4 races run over 1 year
- Team: No. 51 (Dale Coyne Racing)
- Best finish: 34th (2024)
- First race: 2024 Children's of Alabama; Indy Grand Prix (Barber)
- Last race: 2024 Grand Prix of Monterey (Laguna Seca)
Wins	Podiums	Poles
0	0	0

Previous series
- 2024 2017–2020, 2022 2016 2014–2015 2014 2013 2012–2013 2012 2011–2012: IndyCar Series; FIA Formula 2 Championship; GP2 Series; GP3 Series; Formula Renault 3.5 Series; Eurocup Formula Renault 2.0; Formula Renault 2.0 Alps; Formula Renault 2.0 NEC; Formula Abarth

Luca Ghiotto (born 24 February 1995) is an Italian racing driver who last competed in the 2025 24 Hours of Le Mans and 2025 European Le Mans Series for Inter Europol Competition. He also competed in select rounds in the 2024 IndyCar Series for Dale Coyne Racing.

== Career ==
=== Karting ===
Born in Arzignano, Ghiotto entered karting in 2008, when he took the title in the KF3 class of the Champions Cup, before he finished fourth the following year. Ghiotto remained in the KF3 category until the end of 2010.

=== Formula Abarth ===
In 2011, Ghiotto made his début in single-seaters, taking part in the Formula Abarth series for Prema Powerteam. He finished ninth in the Italian Series standings with a single podium at Misano, while in the European Series he finished sixth with four podiums. He contested a sophomore campaign with the same team in 2012, improving to runner-up spots in both championships.

=== Formula Renault ===
Ghiotto remained with Prema, as they moved to the 2-litre Formula Renault machinery to compete in the final rounds of Formula Renault 2.0 Alps and Formula Renault 2.0 NEC at the end of 2012. For 2013, Ghiotto had full-time campaigns in both Formula Renault 2.0 Alps and the Eurocup Formula Renault 2.0, staying with Prema. He took a podium finish at Le Castellet, as well as a victory at Spa, and finished ninth in the final championship standings. In the Alps series, he scored five wins and finished as runner-up to teammate Antonio Fuoco. He also won the main race of the Formula Renault 2.0 Pau Trophy.

Ghiotto graduated to the Formula Renault 3.5 Series in 2014, competing for International Draco Racing.

=== GP3 Series ===
==== 2014 ====
Ghiotto made his debut in 2014 with Trident at Spa-Francorchamps. He took pole position on his debut, but did not score in any of the four races he entered.

==== 2015 ====
Ghiotto remained with Trident for 2015, taking five victories in the season, but losing the title to Esteban Ocon by eight points.

=== GP2 Series ===
In February 2016, it was announced that Ghiotto would be graduating to the series, whilst continuing his collaboration with Trident. After a shaky start to the season, he claimed his first victory at the sprint race in Sepang and finished eighth in the overall standings.

=== FIA Formula 2 Championship ===
==== 2017 ====
In 2017, Ghiotto switched to Russian Time. He took one victory that season and finished fourth in the championship. Originally, he won both races in Monza, but was denied the feature race win due to leaving the track after having avoiding contact with Nyck de Vries and Charles Leclerc. After Ghiotto was stripped of his win, the victory was given to his country-mate Antonio Fuoco.

==== 2018 ====
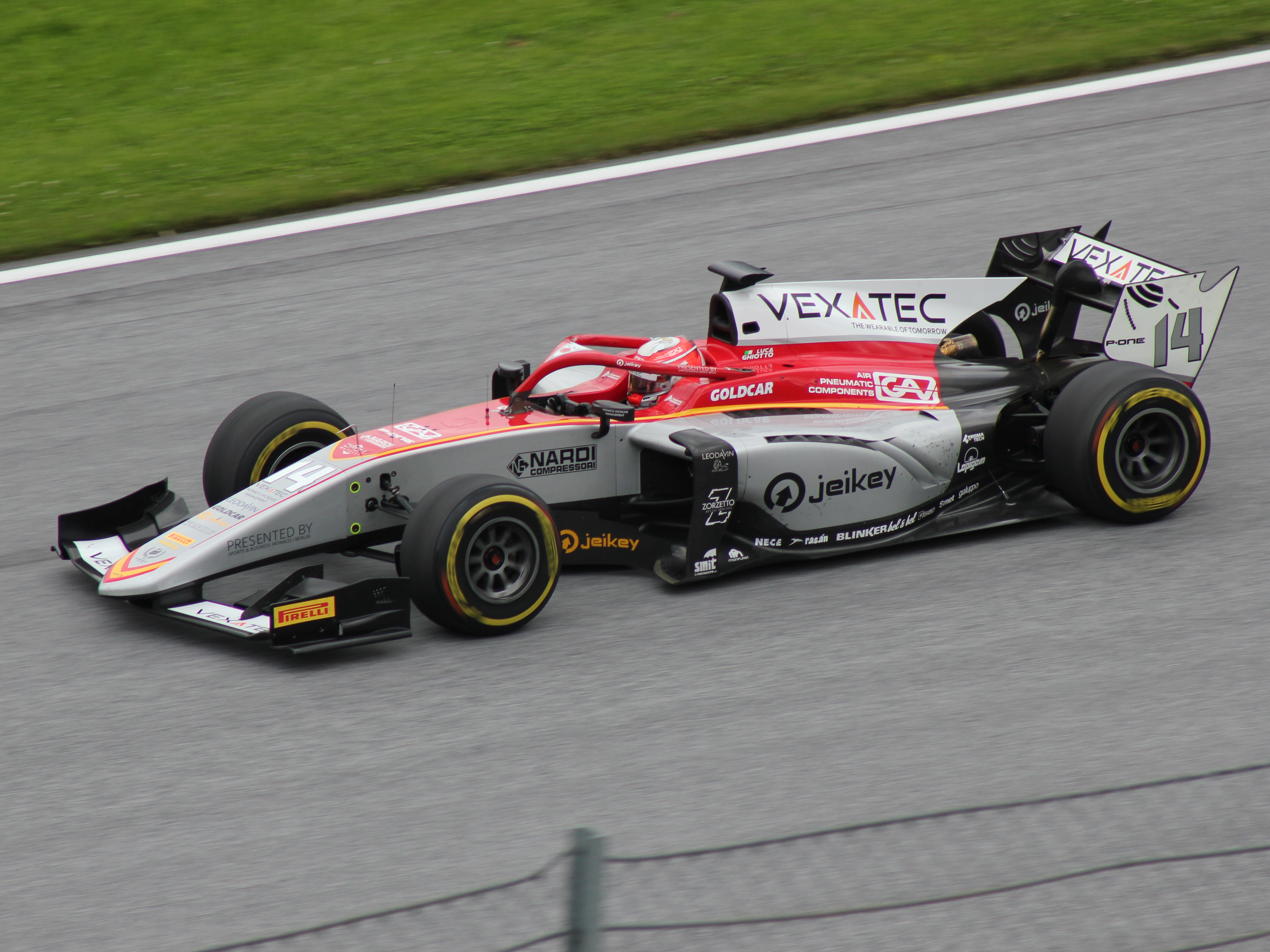
Ghiotto at the 2018 Spielberg Formula 2 round with Campos Racing

In 2018, Ghiotto drove for Campos Racing alongside Israeli Roy Nissany. He took four podiums and finished eighth in the championship.

==== 2019 ====
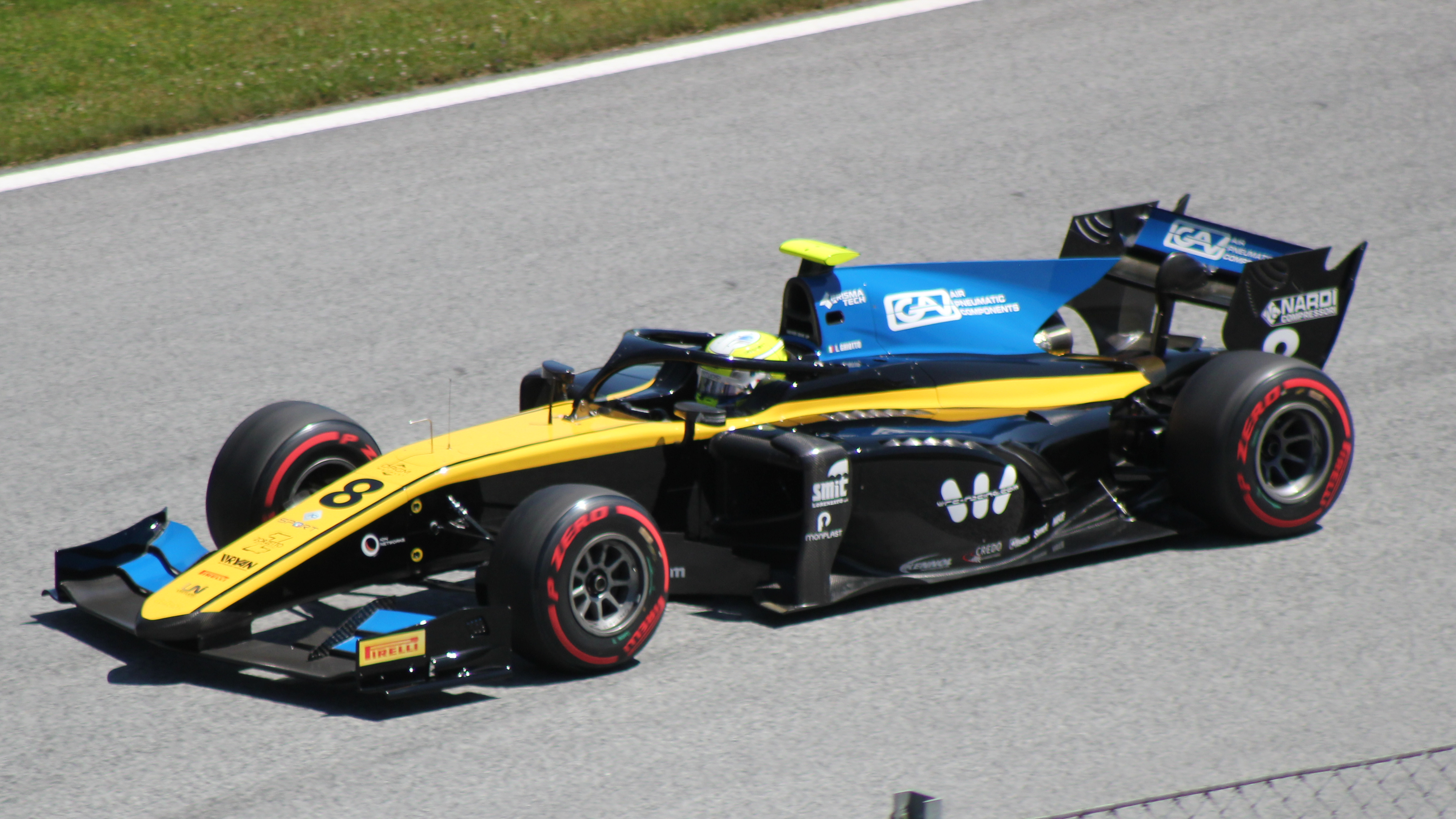
Ghiotto at the 2019 Spielberg Formula 2 round with UNI-Virtuosi Racing

Ghiotto moved to Virtuosi Racing to partner Chinese driver Guanyu Zhou in 2019. Ghiotto started the season very well with pole position, second place at race 1, and victory at race 2 in Bahrain. However, he scored only two points at Azerbaijan. The Italian once again took pole position at Spain, but was hit by Campos driver Dorian Boccolacci, who was later penalized with a drive-through penalty. He charged through the field to finish fourth and achieved another podium in Race 2, finishing in second. At Monaco, originally, he finished second at the feature race, but was disqualified, and in the second race he hit the Arden car of Tatiana Calderon and the MP Motorsport car of Mahaveer Raghunathan. Ghiotto had to retire the car, and was given a three-place grid penalty for causing a collision with the two drivers. At Le Castellet, he also had a nightmare weekend. In Race 1, he was hit by Juan Manuel Correa, causing him to retire with suspension damage. In Race 2, he only finished thirteenth, scoring no points. In Spielberg, he took two podium finishes with two second places. In Great Britain, he qualified second behind his teammate Guanyu Zhou, who also made history with achieving the first pole position of a Chinese driver in GP2 or F2. He passed Guanyu before the first corner, and took the victory in the feature race. At Hungaroring, he finished fourth and eighth respectively.

In Spa-Francorchamps, the two races were cancelled after a tragic accident in the feature race, after Giuliano Alesi lost control of his car due to a puncture, which provoked an accident, that resulted in serious injures for Juan Manuel Correa, and the death of French driver Anthoine Hubert. In Monza Ghiotto took the fastest lap along with second place in the feature race, but after making contact with Sérgio Sette Câmara and Nyck de Vries, he only finished in fifteenth position in the sprint race. At Sochi, he finished fourth in the first race with taking fastest lap once again, however he lost the podium to Louis Delétraz on the final lap. In the second race, he came from fifth on the grid to first place and took his third win of the year. In the final round at Abu Dhabi, Ghiotto scored eight points in the first race by finishing sixth. In the sprint race, he started third, but overtook Nicholas Latifi for second place. A few laps later, he passed Trident driver Giuliano Alesi for the race lead. Due to the retirements of Artem Markelov, Sean Gelael and contact between Nikita Mazepin and Matevos Isaakyan, there were three virtual safety cars. By that, Ghiotto extended his race lead and comfortably won his fourth race of the year. He finished third in the championship, just behind champion Nyck de Vries and runner-up Nicholas Latifi.

==== 2020 ====
In 2020, Ghiotto drove for the new Hitech Grand Prix team alongside Nikita Mazepin. He won the sprint race in Budapest and ended up tenth in the standings, five positions behind his Russian teammate. Ghiotto left Formula 2 at the end of the season.

==== 2022 ====
Ghiotto returned to the 2022 Formula 2 Championship on a one-off return at Monza, replacing Roy Nissany as the Israeli driver was serving a race ban.

== Formula One ==
In August 2017, Ghiotto participated in the post-Hungarian Grand Prix test for Williams Martini Racing.

== Formula E ==
In April 2023, Ghiotto was announced to drive for the Nissan Formula E Team during the Berlin rookie test, whilst also being confirmed as the team's simulator driver. Ghiotto once again drove Formula E machinery during the rookie practice session at the Rome ePrix. He then took part in the rookie pre-season test with the team for the 2023–24 season.

== IndyCar Series ==
=== Dale Coyne Racing (2024) ===
In April 2024, Ghiotto signed a two-race contract to drive for Dale Coyne Racing with Rick Ware Racing for the races at Barber Motorsports Park and the Indianapolis Motor Speedway road course. He later drove for the team at Road America and Laguna Seca.

== Karting record ==
=== Karting career summary ===
Season	Series	Team	Position
2008	Champions Cup — KF3		1st
2008	Bridgestone Cup Europe — KF3		11th
2008	Torneo Industrie — KF3	Gandolfio Ennio Racing	18th
2008	Italian Open Masters — KF3	Ghiotti Franco	DNF
2009	Spanish Karting Championship — KF3		36th
2009	South Garda Winter Cup — KF3	Gandolfi Ennio Racing	DNF
2009	WSK International Series — KF3	Gandolfi Ennio Racing	DNF
2010	Trofeo delle Industrie — KF2		20th
2010	WSK Master Series — KF2		13th
2010	Bridgestone Cup Europe — KF2		8th
2010	WSK World Series — KF2		21st
2010	Andrea Margutti Trophy — KF2		30th
2010	CIK-FIA Karting European Championship — KF2	Chiesa Corse	71st
2010	CIK-FIA Asia-Pacific Championship — KF2	Chiesa Corse	21st
2010	Karting World Championship — KF2	Chiesa Corse	23rd

== Racing record ==
=== Racing career summary ===
Season	Series	Team	Races	Wins	Poles	F/Laps	Podiums	Points	Position
2011	Formula Abarth Italian Series	Prema Powerteam	14	0	1	2	1	42	9th
2011	Formula Abarth European Series	Prema Powerteam	14	0	0	1	4	65	6th
2012	Formula Abarth European Series	Prema Powerteam	24	7	8	9	11	246	**2nd**
2012	Formula Abarth Italian Series	Prema Powerteam	18	6	7	7	7	175	**2nd**
2012	Formula Renault 2.0 Alps	Prema Powerteam	4	0	0	0	0	22	19th
2012	Formula Renault 2.0 NEC	Prema Powerteam	2	0	0	0	0	7	44th
2013	Formula Renault 2.0 Alps	Prema Powerteam	14	5	0	2	8	211	**2nd**
2013	Eurocup Formula Renault 2.0	Prema Powerteam	14	1	1	0	2	69	9th
2013	Pau Formula Renault 2.0 Trophy	Prema Powerteam	1	1	0	0	1	N/A	**1st**
2014	Formula Renault 3.5 Series	International Draco Racing	17	0	0	0	0	26	17th
2014	GP3 Series	Trident	4	0	1	0	0	4	20th
2015	GP3 Series	Trident	18	5	5	9	8	245	**2nd**
2016	GP2 Series	Trident	22	1	0	2	4	111	8th
2017	FIA Formula 2 Championship	Russian Time	22	1	0	0	7	185	4th
2017	Formula One	Williams Martini Racing	Test driver						
2018	FIA Formula 2 Championship	Campos Vexatec Racing	24	0	0	1	4	111	8th
2019	FIA Formula 2 Championship	UNI-Virtuosi Racing	22	4	2	2	9	207	**3rd**
2019–20	FIA World Endurance Championship	Team LNT	1	0	0	0	1	0.5	24th
2020	FIA Formula 2 Championship	Hitech Grand Prix	23	1	0	2	4	106	10th
2020	Intercontinental GT Challenge	R-Motorsport	0	0	0	0	0	0	NC
2021	Italian GT Championship	Imperiale Racing	6	0	1	1	5	46	5th
2021	GT World Challenge Europe Endurance Cup	Emil Frey Racing	1	0	0	0	0	0	NC
2021	ADAC GT Masters	T3 Motorsport	4	0	0	0	0	21	28th
2022	GT World Challenge Europe Sprint Cup	Tresor by Car Collection	8	0	0	0	0	22	10th
2022	GT World Challenge Europe Endurance Cup	Tresor by Car Collection	5	0	0	0	0	12	24th
2022	IMSA SportsCar Championship - LMP2	G-Drive Racing by APR	1	0	0	0	0	0	NC
2022	FIA Formula 2 Championship	DAMS	2	0	0	0	0	0	25th
2022–23	Formula E	Nissan Formula E Team	Simulator driver						
2023–24	Formula E	Nissan Formula E Team	Simulator driver						
2024	European Le Mans Series - LMP2	Inter Europol Competition	6	0	0	0	1	47	7th
2024	IndyCar Series	Dale Coyne Racing with Rick Ware Racing	4	0	0	0	0	27	34th
2025	European Le Mans Series - LMP2	Inter Europol Competition	6	0	0	1	0	23	12th
2025	24 Hours of Le Mans - LMP2 Pro-Am	Inter Europol Competition	1	0	0	0	0	N/A	5th
2026	European Le Mans Series - LMP2	Inter Europol Competition	1	0	0	0	0	6	18th
2026	Italian GT Championship Sprint Cup - GT3	Oregon Team	2	0	0	0	0	0	NC†
2026	Italian GT Championship Endurance Cup - GT3	Easy Race	1	0	0	0	0	0	NC†

=== Complete Formula Renault 2.0 Alps Series results ===
(key) (Races in bold indicate pole position; races in italics indicate fastest lap)

Year	Team	1	2	3	4	5	6	7	8	9	10	11	12	13	14	Pos	Points
2012	Prema Powerteam	MNZ; 1	MNZ; 2	PAU; 1	PAU; 2	IMO; 1	IMO; 2	SPA; 1	SPA; 2	RBR; 1	RBR; 2	MUG; 1; 6	MUG; 2; 6	CAT; 1; 13	CAT; 2; 7	19th	22
2013	Prema Powerteam	VLL; 1; 5	VLL; 2; 2	IMO1; 1; 6	IMO1; 2; 6	SPA; 1 Ret	SPA; 2; 1	MNZ; 1; 3	MNZ; 2; 1	MIS; 1; 11	MIS; 2; 1	MUG; 1; 3	MUG; 2; 5	**IMO2**; **1**; 1	IMO2; 2; 1	2nd	211

=== Complete Formula Renault 2.0 NEC results ===
(key) (Races in bold indicate pole position) (Races in italics indicate fastest lap)

Year	Entrant	1	2	3	4	5	6	7	8	9	10	11	12	13	14	15	16	17	18	19	20	DC	Points
2012	Prema Powerteam	HOC; 1	HOC; 2	HOC; 3	NÜR; 1	NÜR; 2	OSC; 1	OSC; 2	OSC; 3	ASS; 1	ASS; 2	RBR; 1	RBR; 2	MST; 1	MST; 2	MST; 3	ZAN; 1	ZAN; 2	ZAN; 3	SPA; 1; 14	SPA; 2 Ret	44th	7

=== Complete Eurocup Formula Renault 2.0 results ===
(key) (Races in bold indicate pole position) (Races in italics indicate fastest lap)

Year	Entrant	1	2	3	4	5	6	7	8	9	10	11	12	13	14	Pos	Points
2013	Prema Powerteam	ALC; 1; 14	ALC; 2; 25	SPA; 1; 31	SPA; 2; 1	MSC; 1; 5	MSC; 2; 9	RBR; 1; 32	RBR; 2; 7	HUN; 1; 6	HUN; 2; 11	LEC; 1; 2	**LEC**; **2**; 22	CAT; 1; 27	CAT; 2; 23	9th	69

=== Complete Formula Renault 3.5 Series results ===
(key) (Races in bold indicate pole position) (Races in italics indicate fastest lap)

Year	Team	1	2	3	4	5	6	7	8	9	10	11	12	13	14	15	16	17	Pos	Points
2014	International Draco Racing	MNZ; 1; 16	MNZ; 2; 4	ALC; 1; 16	ALC; 2 Ret	MON; 1; 14	SPA; 1; 6	SPA; 2 Ret	MSC; 1; 16	MSC; 2; 14	NÜR; 1 Ret	NÜR; 2; 15	HUN; 1; 11	HUN; 2; 19	LEC; 1; 7	LEC; 2; 16	JER; 1; 13	JER; 2 Ret	17th	26

=== Complete GP3 Series results ===
(key) (Races in bold indicate pole position) (Races in italics indicate fastest lap)

Year	Entrant	1	2	3	4	5	6	7	8	9	10	11	12	13	14	15	16	17	18	Pos	Points
2014	Trident	CAT; FEA	CAT; SPR	RBR; FEA	RBR; SPR	SIL; FEA	SIL; SPR	HOC; FEA	HOC; SPR	HUN; FEA	HUN; SPR	**SPA**; **FEA**; 18	SPA; SPR; 14	MNZ; FEA; 21	MNZ; SPR; 13	SOC; FEA	SOC; SPR	YMC; FEA	YMC; SPR	20th	4
2015	Trident	**CAT**; **FEA**; 2	CAT; SPR; 8	**RBR**; **FEA**; 1	RBR; SPR; 3	SIL; FEA; 4	SIL; SPR; 7	**HUN**; **FEA**; 1	HUN; SPR; 4	**SPA**; **FEA**; 5	SPA; SPR; 1	**MNZ**; **FEA**; Ret	MNZ; SPR; 3	SOC; FEA; 1	SOC; SPR; 8	BHR; FEA; 4	BHR; SPR; 1	YMC; FEA; 5	YMC; SPR; 4	2nd	245

=== Complete GP2 Series/FIA Formula 2 Championship results ===
(key) (Races in bold indicate pole position) (Races in italics indicate points for the fastest lap of top ten finishers)

Year	Entrant	1	2	3	4	5	6	7	8	9	10	11	12	13	14	15	16	17	18	19	20	21	22	23	24	25	26	27	28	DC	Points
2016	Trident	CAT; FEA; Ret	CAT; SPR; 12	MON; FEA; Ret	MON; SPR; 14	BAK; FEA; 9	BAK; SPR; 12	RBR; FEA; 4	RBR; SPR; 9	SIL; FEA; 5	SIL; SPR; 2	HUN; FEA; 17	HUN; SPR; Ret	HOC; FEA; 2	HOC; SPR; 4	SPA; FEA; 7	SPA; SPR; 3	MNZ; FEA; 6	MNZ; SPR; Ret	SEP; FEA; 7	SEP; SPR; 1	YMC; FEA; 11	YMC; SPR; 19							8th	111
2017	Russian Time	BHR; FEA; 7	BHR; SPR; 2	CAT; FEA; 2	CAT; SPR; 7	MON; FEA; 5	MON; SPR; 4	BAK; FEA; 16	BAK; SPR; 7	RBR; FEA; 14	RBR; SPR; 4	SIL; FEA; 6	SIL; SPR; 2	HUN; FEA; 6	HUN; SPR; 8	SPA; FEA; 2	SPA; SPR; 3	MNZ; FEA; 4	MNZ; SPR; 1	JER; FEA; 7	JER; SPR; 4	YMC; FEA; 3	YMC; SPR; 5							4th	185
2018	Campos Vexatec Racing	BHR; FEA; 12	BHR; SPR; 6	BAK; FEA; Ret	BAK; SPR; 14	CAT; FEA; 4	CAT; SPR; 5	MON; FEA; Ret	MON; SPR; 10	LEC; FEA; 3	LEC; SPR; 3	RBR; FEA; 12	RBR; SPR; 13	SIL; FEA; 5	SIL; SPR; 10	HUN; FEA; 6	HUN; SPR; 2	SPA; FEA; 7	SPA; SPR; 6	MNZ; FEA; 10	MNZ; SPR; 6	SOC; FEA; Ret	SOC; SPR; 14	YMC; FEA; 3	YMC; SPR; 9					8th	111
2019	UNI-Virtuosi Racing	**BHR**; **FEA**; 2	BHR; SPR; 1	BAK; FEA; 9	BAK; SPR; Ret	**CAT**; **FEA**; 4	CAT; SPR; 2	MON; FEA; DSQ	MON; SPR; Ret	LEC; FEA; Ret	LEC; SPR; 12	RBR; FEA; 2	RBR; SPR; 2	SIL; FEA; 1	SIL; SPR; 15	HUN; FEA; 4	HUN; SPR; 8	SPA; FEA; C	SPA; SPR; C	MNZ; FEA; 2	MNZ; SPR; 15	SOC; FEA; 4	SOC; SPR; 1	YMC; FEA; 6	YMC; SPR; 1					3rd	207
2020	Hitech Grand Prix	RBR; FEA; DNS	RBR; SPR; Ret	RBR; FEA; 11	RBR; SPR; 10	HUN; FEA; 4	HUN; SPR; 1	SIL; FEA; 17	SIL; SPR; 19†	SIL; FEA; 13	SIL; SPR; 10	CAT; FEA; 8	CAT; SPR; 2	SPA; FEA; 9	SPA; SPR; 5	MNZ; FEA; 2	MNZ; SPR; 15	MUG; FEA; 2	MUG; SPR; Ret	SOC; FEA; 4	SOC; SPR; 5	BHR; FEA; 12	BHR; SPR; Ret	BHR; FEA; 16	BHR; SPR; 7					10th	106
2022	DAMS	BHR; SPR	BHR; FEA	JED; SPR	JED; FEA	IMO; SPR	IMO; FEA	CAT; SPR	CAT; FEA	MCO; SPR	MCO; FEA	BAK; SPR	BAK; FEA	SIL; SPR	SIL; FEA	RBR; SPR	RBR; FEA	LEC; SPR	LEC; FEA	HUN; SPR	HUN; FEA	SPA; SPR	SPA; FEA	ZAN; SPR	ZAN; FEA	MNZ; SPR; 13	MNZ; FEA; Ret	YMC; SPR	YMC; FEA	25th	0

=== Complete FIA World Endurance Championship results ===
Year	Entrant	Class	Chassis	Engine	1	2	3	4	5	6	7	8	Rank	Points
2019–20	Team LNT	LMP1	Ginetta G60-LT-P1	AER P60C 2.4 L Turbo V6	SIL	FUJ; 11	SHA	BHR	COA	SPA	LMS	BHR	24th	0.5

=== Complete GT World Challenge Europe results ===
==== GT World Challenge Europe Endurance Cup ====
(key) (Races in bold indicate pole position) (Races in italics indicate fastest lap)

Year	Team	Car	Class	1	2	3	4	5	6	7	Pos.	Points
2021	Emil Frey Racing	Lamborghini Huracán GT3 Evo	Pro	MNZ	LEC	SPA; 6H	SPA; 12H	SPA; 24H	NÜR; 5	CAT	21st	10
2022	Tresor by Car Collection	Audi R8 LMS Evo II	Pro	IMO; 4	LEC; 12	SPA; 6H; Ret	SPA; 12H; Ret	SPA; 24H; Ret	HOC; 38	CAT; 42	24th	12

==== GT World Challenge Europe Sprint Cup ====
(key) (Races in bold indicate pole position) (Races in italics indicate fastest lap)

Year	Team	Car	Class	1	2	3	4	5	6	7	8	9	10	Pos.	Points
2022	Tresor by Car Collection	Audi R8 LMS Evo II	Pro	BRH; 1; 6	BRH; 2; 7	MAG; 1; 5	MAG; 2; 8	ZAN; 1; 8	ZAN; 2; 13	MIS; 1	MIS; 2	VAL; 1; 6	VAL; 2; 13	10th	22

=== Complete IMSA SportsCar Championship results ===
(key) (Races in bold indicate pole position; results in italics indicate fastest lap)

Year	Team	Class	Make	Engine	1	2	3	4	5	6	7	Pos.	Points
2022	G-Drive Racing by APR	LMP2	Oreca 07	Gibson GK428 V8	DAY; 8†	SEB	LGA	MDO	WGL	ELK	PET	NC†	0†

^{†} Points only counted towards the Michelin Endurance Cup, and not the overall LMP2 Championship.

=== Complete European Le Mans Series results ===
(key) (Races in bold indicate pole position; results in italics indicate fastest lap)

Year	Entrant	Class	Chassis	Engine	1	2	3	4	5	6	Rank	Points
2024	Inter Europol Competition	LMP2	Oreca 07	Gibson GK428 4.2 L V8	CAT; 8	LEC; Ret	IMO; 7	SPA; 4	MUG; 3	ALG; 5	7th	47
2025	Inter Europol Competition	LMP2	Oreca 07	Gibson GK428 4.2 L V8	CAT; 9	LEC; 10	IMO; 6	SPA; 5	SIL; 9	ALG; Ret	12th	23
2026	Inter Europol Competition	LMP2	Oreca 07	Gibson GK428 4.2 L V8	CAT	LEC; 7	IMO	SPA	SIL	ALG	18th	6

=== Complete 24 Hours of Le Mans results ===
Year	Team	Co-Drivers	Car	Class	Laps	Pos.	Class Pos.
2025	(Poland) Inter Europol Competition	(United States) Nick Boulle (France) Jean-Baptiste Simmenauer	Oreca 07-Gibson	LMP2	363	27th	10th
2025	(Poland) Inter Europol Competition	(United States) Nick Boulle (France) Jean-Baptiste Simmenauer	Oreca 07-Gibson	LMP2 Pro-Am	363	27th	5th

=== American open-wheel racing results ===
==== IndyCar Series ====
(key) (Races in bold indicate pole position; races in italics indicate fastest lap)

Year	Team	No.	Chassis	Engine	1	2	3	4	5	6	7	8	9	10	11	12	13	14	15	16	17	18	Rank	Points	Ref
2024	Dale Coyne Racing w/ Rick Ware Racing	51	Dallara DW12	Honda	STP	THE	LBH	ALA; 21	IMS; 25	INDY	DET	ROA; 22	LAG; 27	MDO	IOW	IOW	TOR	GTW	POR	MIL	MIL	NSH	34th	27	
