= Mathéo Tuscher =

Swiss racing driver

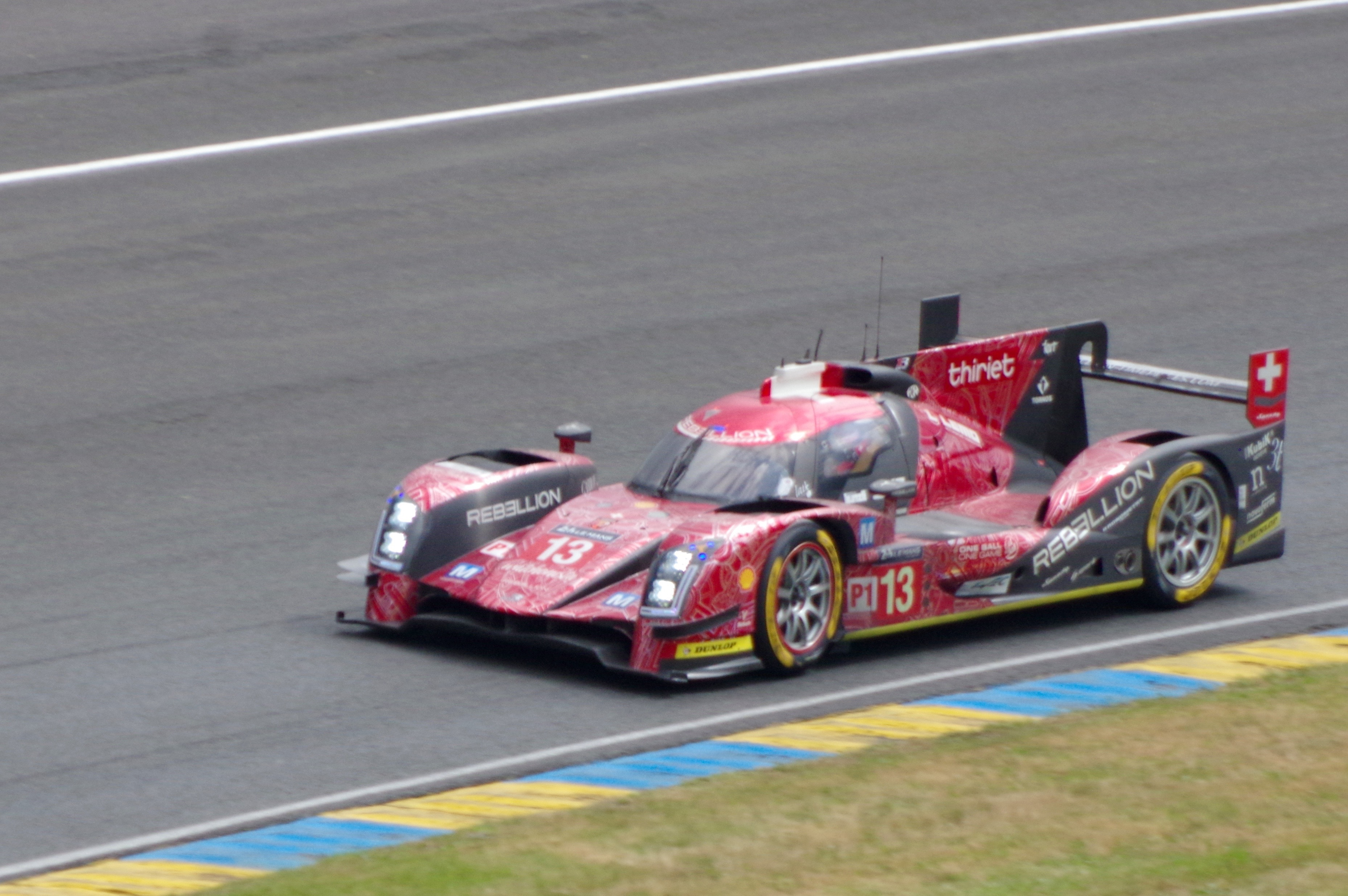
- The Rebellion R-One driven by Mathéo Tuscher during the 2016 FIA World Endurance Championship season.
- Nationality: (Switzerland) Swiss
- Born: 12 December 1996 (age 29) Noville, Switzerland

FIA World Endurance Championship career
- Debut season: 2015
- Categorisation: FIA Silver
- Former teams: Rebellion Racing
- Starts: 11 (11 entries)
- Wins: 0
- Podiums: 2
- Poles: 0
- Fastest laps: 0
- Best finish: 7th in 2016

Previous series
- 2014–15 2013 2012 2011: GP3 Series; Formula Renault 3.5 Series; FIA Formula Two Championship; Formula Pilota China

Championship titles
- 2011: Formula Pilota China

Awards
- 2012: Autosport Rookie of the Year

Mathéo Tuscher (born 12 December 1996 in Noville) is a Swiss former professional racing driver. He won the 2011 Formula Pilota China title and finished second in the final season of the FIA Formula Two Championship. After racing in the GP3 Series for two seasons, Tuscher drove in the LMP1 category of the FIA World Endurance Championship for Rebellion Racing.

== Career ==
=== Karting ===
Tuscher began karting in 2004 and raced primarily in his native Switzerland for the majority of his career, winning the Swiss KF3 championship in 2008. He won the Swiss junior title in 2009.

=== Formula Pilota China ===
In 2011, at just fourteen years old, Tuscher graduated to single–seaters, racing in the newly launched Formula Pilota China series in Asia for Jenzer Welch Asia Racing under a Czech racing license. He dominated from the beginning of the season, winning eight races at all six venues and the championship title.

=== FIA Formula Two Championship ===
In 2012 Tuscher stepped up into the FIA Formula Two Championship. He became the youngest ever driver in the revived category, competing at the age of fifteen. On his series début at Silverstone, Tuscher qualified on pole position. He finished sixth and fifth in the weekend's races. Tuscher scored his first podium of the series in the following round in the Algarve, finishing second in both races and moving into second in the standings. Further podiums at the Nürburgring, Spa-Francorchamps, and Brands Hatch followed, before Tuscher claimed his first series win from pole in Le Castellet. He then finished race 2 in second place. Tuscher retired from race 1 at the Hungaroring after being crashed into by Mihai Marinescu, but bounced back to finish second in race 2. At race 1 of the Monza season finale, Tuscher fell to third after starting from pole; he subsequently battled past Kevin Mirocha to win. Tuscher's title hopes ended with a bad start in race 2 that dropped him to ninth, though he recovered by fifth before the race ended. In recognition of his runner-up championship finish, Tuscher was named Autosport Rookie of the Year.

=== Formula Renault 3.5 Series ===
During 2013, Tuscher only made a single racing appearance, driving for Zeta Corse in the Aragón round of the Formula Renault 3.5 Series. He finished 22nd and last in race 1 before retiring on the final lap of race 2.

=== GP3 Series ===
==== 2014 ====
In 2014, Tuscher graduated to GP3 with Jenzer Motorsport. Having held off the likes of Nick Yelloly and Patric Niederhauser to finish eighth in the season-opening Barcelona feature race, he started the sprint race from reversed-grid pole. Though Dean Stoneman passed him on lap 2, Tuscher went on to finish second. Tuscher then climbed from 14th to sixth in the Red Bull Ring feature race. Having started the sprint race from third, Tuscher made contact with Luís Sá Silva on lap 2 while battling for the lead and retired. Tuscher scored a lone point at Silverstone by finishing eighth in the sprint race. Following this, Tuscher went three rounds without finishing inside the top ten; he struggled with tyre wear in Hockenheim and was off the pace in Hungary. During the Spa feature race, Tuscher benefited from starting on dry tyres on a damp track, which allowed him to carve his way to the lead. On lap 8 however, Tuscher spun out into retirement at Eau Rouge. Tuscher returned to the points with an eighth place in the Monza feature race. He fell back from reversed-grid pole during the sprint race, before colliding with Patrick Kujala. In the last four races of the campaign, Tuscher retired twice, including the Yas Marina feature race where he was spun out by Kujala. Overall, Tuscher finished his maiden GP3 season (during which he had been the series's youngest competitor) 12th in the standings.

==== 2015 ====
Tuscher returned to GP3 in 2015, once again driving with Jenzer. Tuscher set a personal record by qualifying fifth at the Barcelona season opener, but fell back to 14th in the feature race. He failed to score points in Spielberg, finishing 12th on Saturday and being excluded from sixth place on Sunday due to a non-conformity of the undertray height dimensions. In Silverstone, Tuscher scored his maiden point of the campaign during the feature race by recovering from 20th to tenth. Tuscher repeated this feature race result in Hungary. On Saturday at Spa, Tuscher retired in bizarre circumstances: he lost the car on throttle during a VSC restart and speared into Sandy Stuvik. He received a five-place grid drop for Sunday's sprint, where he charged from the back of the field to an impressive fourth. Tuscher scored points in both Monza races, finishing sixth in both races despite making contact with Alex Fontana in a battle for the lead on Sunday. At Sochi, Tuscher qualified second, but stalled on the grid due to a broken driveshaft. Tuscher failed to score in the final five races - suffering retirements in the sprint races at Sochi and Bahrain. He finished 13th in the championship.

=== FIA World Endurance Championship ===
==== 2015 ====
For his first ever endurance race, Tuscher joined Rebellion Racing in the top class of the 2015 FIA World Endurance Championship. He, alongside teammates Dominik Kraihamer and Alexandre Imperatori, retired from the 6 Hours of Shanghai late on due to a fire. Despite this, Tuscher's debut was later described as "impressive" by Dailysportscar. His start at Shanghai also made him the youngest driver to drive an LMP1 car in the WEC. At Bahrain, Tuscher and his teammates won the class for privately-entered LMP1 cars after the other two competitors fell behind with technical troubles.

==== 2016 ====
Tuscher remained at Rebellion Racing to contest the entire 2016 WEC season. The No. 13 finished fourth overall at the first round in Silverstone, before being promoted to the podium after the No. 7 Audi was disqualified. Another third place overall followed at Spa-Francorchamps, where Tuscher and his teammates profited from reliability troubles of their competitors. This briefly promoted the No. 13 crew of Tuscher, Imperatori, and Kraihamer into second in the championship. At the 24 Hours of Le Mans however, this run of form came to an end as Tuscher retired during the night with a fuel injector failure. The No. 13 finished seventh at the Nürburgring, first of the privateer entrants. As the sister car exited the championship following that round, Tuscher and his teammates only had to battle the ByKolles Racing Team for privateer honours. They subsequently won the subclass by finishing fifth overall in Mexico, seventh at Austin, and sixth at Fuji. The No. 13 suffered problems at Shanghai and finished behind the ByKolles car for the first time that season, but took another subclass win with seventh overall at Bahrain. The trio of Tuscher, Imperatori, and Kraihamer finished seventh in the overall drivers' championship.

== After racing ==
Despite wanting to continue driving for Rebellion in the LMP2 class of the WEC in 2017, Tuscher and the team split in February 2017. He went on to work in the family company Tuscher & Fils. He stated that he did not regret stepping away from motorsport, saying that whilst he had been disappointed not to be re-signed by Rebellion in 2017, he "no longer wanted to spend [his] time chasing money".

== Racing record ==
=== Career summary ===
Season	Series	Team	Races	Wins	Poles	F/Laps	Podiums	Points	Position
2011	Formula Pilota China	Jenzer Welch Asia Racing	12	8	10	8	9	189	**1st**
2012	FIA Formula Two Championship	Motorsport Vision	16	2	4	1	9	210	**2nd**
2013	Formula Renault 3.5 Series	Zeta Corse	2	0	0	0	0	0	30th
2014	GP3 Series	Jenzer Motorsport	18	0	0	0	1	29	12th
2015	GP3 Series	Jenzer Motorsport	18	0	0	0	0	22	13th
2015	FIA World Endurance Championship	Rebellion Racing	2	0	0	0	0	0.5	32nd
2016	FIA World Endurance Championship	Rebellion Racing	9	0	0	0	2	66.5	7th
2016	24 Hours of Le Mans	Rebellion Racing	1	0	0	0	0	N/A	DNF

=== Complete Formula Pilota China results ===
(key) (Races in bold indicate pole position) (Races in italics indicate fastest lap)

Year	Entrant	1	2	3	4	5	6	7	8	9	10	11	12	Pos	Points
2011	Jenzer Welch Asia Racing	**GUA**; **1**; 1	**GUA**; **2**; 1	**SHI**; **1** Ret	**SHI**; **2**; 1	**SHI**; **1**; 1	**SHI**; **2**; 1	**ORD**; **1**; 6	**ORD**; **2**; 1	SHT; 1; 5	**SHT**; **2**; 1	SEP; 1; 1	**SEP**; **2**; 2	1st	189

=== Complete FIA Formula Two Championship results ===
(key) (Races in bold indicate pole position) (Races in italics indicate fastest lap)

Year	1	2	3	4	5	6	7	8	9	10	11	12	13	14	15	16	Pos	Points	Ref
2012	**SIL**; **1**; 6	SIL; 2; 5	ALG; 1; 2	**ALG**; **2**; 2	NÜR; 1; 5	NÜR; 2; 3	SPA; 1; 3	SPA; 2; 8	BRH; 1; 2	BRH; 2 Ret	**LEC**; **1**; 1	LEC; 2; 2	HUN; 1 Ret	HUN; 2; 2	**MNZ**; **1**; 1	MNZ; 2; 5	2nd	210	

=== Complete Formula Renault 3.5 Series results ===
(key) (Races in bold indicate pole position) (Races in italics indicate fastest lap)

Year	Entrant	1	2	3	4	5	6	7	8	9	10	11	12	13	14	15	16	17	Pos	Points
2013	Zeta Corse	MNZ; 1	MNZ; 2	ALC; 1; 22	ALC; 2; 22†	MON	SPA; 1	SPA; 2	MSC; 1	MSC; 2	RBR; 1	RBR; 2	HUN; 1	HUN; 2	LEC; 1	LEC; 2	CAT; 1	CAT; 2	30th	0

=== Complete GP3 Series results ===
(key) (Races in bold indicate pole position) (Races in italics indicate fastest lap)

Year	Entrant	1	2	3	4	5	6	7	8	9	10	11	12	13	14	15	16	17	18	Pos	Points
2014	Jenzer Motorsport	CAT; FEA; 8	CAT; SPR; 2	RBR; FEA; 6	RBR; SPR; Ret	SIL; FEA; 14	SIL; SPR; 8	HOC; FEA; 18	HOC; SPR; 11	HUN; FEA; 22	HUN; SPR; 15	SPA; FEA; Ret	SPA; SPR; 16	MNZ; FEA; 8	MNZ; SPR; Ret	SOC; FEA; Ret	SOC; SPR; 11	YMC; FEA; Ret	YMC; SPR; 10	12th	29
2015	Jenzer Motorsport	CAT; FEA; 14	CAT; SPR; 13	RBR; FEA; 12	RBR; SPR; DSQ	SIL; FEA; 10	SIL; SPR; 9	HUN; FEA; 10	HUN; SPR; 9	SPA; FEA; Ret	SPA; SPR; 4	MNZ; FEA; 6	MNZ; SPR; 6	SOC; FEA; Ret	SOC; SPR; Ret	BHR; FEA; 12	BHR; SPR; Ret	YMC; FEA; 16	YMC; SPR; 14	13th	22

=== Complete FIA World Endurance Championship results ===
Year	Entrant	Class	Chassis	Engine	1	2	3	4	5	6	7	8	9	Rank	Points
2015	Rebellion Racing	LMP1	Rebellion R-One	AER P60 2.4 L Turbo V6	SIL	SPA	LMS	NÜR	COA	FUJ	SHA; Ret	BHR; 11		32nd	0.5
2015	Rebellion Racing	LMP1 Private Teams	Rebellion R-One	AER P60 2.4 L Turbo V6							Ret	1		6th	25
2016	Rebellion Racing	LMP1	Rebellion R-One	AER P60 2.4 L Turbo V6	SIL; 3	SPA; 3	LMS; Ret	NÜR; 7	MEX; 5	COA; 7	FUJ; 6	SHA; 17	BHR; 7	7th	66.5
2016	Rebellion Racing	LMP1 Private Teams	Rebellion R-One	AER P60 2.4 L Turbo V6	1	1	Ret	1	1	1	1	2	1	1st	193

=== 24 Hours of Le Mans results ===
Year	Team	Co-Drivers	Car	Class	Laps	Pos.	Class Pos.
2016	(Switzerland) Rebellion Racing	(Switzerland) Alexandre Imperatori (Austria) Dominik Kraihamer	Rebellion R-One-AER	LMP1	200	DNF	DNF

Sporting positions
Preceded by Inaugural	Formula Pilota China; Champion; 2011	Succeeded by Antonio Giovinazzi
Awards
Preceded by Paul di Resta	Autosport Awards; Rookie of the Year; 2012	Succeeded by Jules Bianchi
