= Mitchell Gilbert =

Malaysian and Australian racing driver (born 1995)

Mitch Gilbert
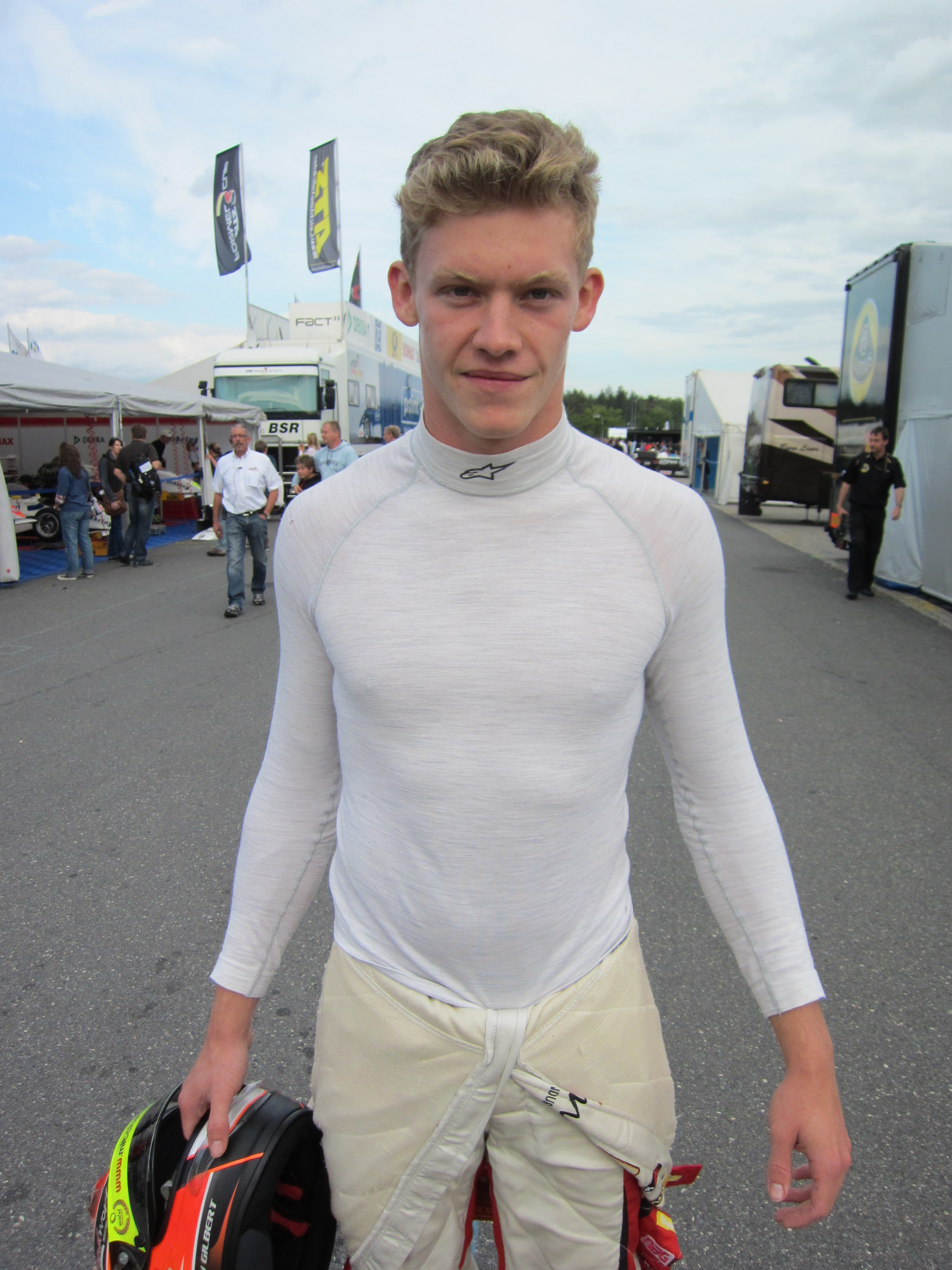
- Gilbert in 2012
- Nationality: (Australia) Australian (Malaysia) Malaysian via dual nationality
- Born: 10 May 1995 (age 31) Kuala Lumpur, Malaysia

GP3 Series career
- Debut season: 2014
- Current team: Carlin
- Categorisation: FIA Silver
- Car number: 88
- Starts: 24
- Wins: 0
- Poles: 0
- Fastest laps: 1
- Best finish: 22nd in 2015

Previous series
- 2013-14 2012 2011 2011: FIA European F3 Championship; ATS F3 Cup; Formula Renault UK; Eurocup Formula Renault 2.0

Mitchell "Mitch" Gilbert (born 10 May 1995) is a Malaysian and Australian racing driver. He has participated under both nationalities at various points in his career.

== Career ==
Born in Kuala Lumpur, Gilbert began his racing career in 2002 in karting, where he was active until 2010. In 2009, he finished third in the KF2 - class of the CIK-FIA World Cup.

At the end of 2010, Gilbert debuted in Formula racing in the winter championship of the British Formula Renault Championship for Fortec Motorsport, under an Australian licence. While his teammate Alex Lynn was champion in this class, Gilbert was tenth, with a best result of third place. In 2011, he made his debut in the main championship of British Formula Renault. While his teammates Lynn and Oliver Rowland ended the season first and second, respectively, Gilbert was fifth in the championship, including a victory at Croft. In 2011, he participated in three race weekends of the Eurocup Formula Renault 2.0 for Fortec.

In 2012, Gilbert made his debut in Formula 3 in the German Formula 3 Championship for Performance Racing. With two victories on the TT Circuit Assen and Lausitzring, he finished fourth in the championship behind Jimmy Eriksson, Lucas Auer and Kimiya Sato. At the end of the season, he also took part in the Macau Grand Prix for Mücke Motorsport, where he finished eighteenth.

In 2013, Gilbert stepped up to the FIA European Formula Three Championship, where he also drove for Mücke. Only at the Nürburgring and Circuit Park Zandvoort did he manage to score points, with a best result of eighth at the Nürburgring, and finished 23rd in the championship with ten points. In 2014, Gilbert moved to Fortec Motorsport, contesting the first six rounds and finishing 16th in the standings with four points finishes.

In 2014, Gilbert made his debut in the GP3 Series at Silverstone, where he replaced Denis Nagulin at Trident. He competed in five rounds and was replaced twice with Luca Ghiotto and Patrick Kujala having failed to score a point. Gilbert remained in GP3 in 2015, switching to Carlin Motorsport. He netted a sole point at Monza in his only full season and was dropped at seasons' end.

From 2016, Gilbert switched to GT racing and began competing with a Malaysian licence. He finished third in Porsche Carrera Cup Asia, before moving into GT3 with Audi in 2017.

Gilbert left the GT racing scene at the end of 2018, and now runs his fathers' furniture business in Ho Chi Minh City whilst sporadically competing in the Indian Racing League.

== Racing record ==
=== Career summary ===
Season	Series	Team	Races	Wins	Poles	F/laps	Podiums	Points	Position
2011	Formula Renault UK	Fortec Motorsports	18	1	0	10	4	317	5th
2011	Eurocup Formula Renault 2.0	Fortec Motorsports	4	0	0	0	0	0	NC
2011	Eurocup Formula Renault 2.0	Tech 1 Racing	2	0	0	0	0	0	NC
2012	German Formula 3 Championship	Performance Racing	27	2	2	4	10	277	4th
2013	FIA Formula 3 European Championship	Mücke Motorsport	30	0	0	0	0	10	23rd
2014	FIA Formula 3 European Championship	Fortec Motorsports	18	0	0	0	0	28	16th
2014	GP3 Series	Trident Racing	8	0	0	1	0	0	26th
2015	GP3 Series	Carlin	16	0	0	0	0	1	22nd
2016	Porsche Carrera Cup Asia	Absolute Racing	12	2	0	1	2	173	**3rd**
2017	Blancpain GT Series Asia	OD Racing Team	12	3	2	0	8	160	**2nd**
2017	Blancpain GT Series Asia - Silver	OD Racing Team	12	4	3	4	9	188	**2nd**
2017–18	Asian Le Mans Series - GT	TianShi Racing Team	1	0	0	0	0	11	11th
2018	Blancpain GT Series Asia	OD Racing Team WRT	12	0	0	0	0	40	18th
2018	Blancpain GT Series Asia - Silver	OD Racing Team WRT	12	0	0	0	0	82	10th
2022	Indian Racing League	Speed Demons Delhi	4	0	0	0	1	27	21st
2023	Indian Racing League	Speed Demons Delhi	3	0	0	0	0	28‡	10th‡

‡ Team standings.

=== Complete Eurocup Formula Renault 2.0 results ===
(key) (Races in bold indicate pole position; races in italics indicate fastest lap)

Year	Entrant	1	2	3	4	5	6	7	8	9	10	11	12	13	14	DC	Points
2011	Tech 1 Racing	ALC; 1	ALC; 2	SPA; 1	SPA; 2	NÜR; 1	NÜR; 2	HUN; 1; 19	HUN; 2; 24	SIL; 1; 13	SIL; 2; 24	LEC; 1	LEC; 2	CAT; 1; 11	CAT; 2; 19	30th	0

=== Complete FIA Formula 3 European Championship results ===
(key)

Year	Entrant	Engine	1	2	3	4	5	6	7	8	9	10	11	12	13	14	15	16	17	18	19	20	21	22	23	24	25	26	27	28	29	30	31	32	33	DC	Points
2013	kfzteile24 Mücke Motorsport	Mercedes	MNZ; 1 Ret	MNZ; 2 Ret	MNZ; 3; 23	SIL; 1; 15	SIL; 2; 14	SIL; 3 Ret	HOC; 1; 17	HOC; 2; 15	HOC; 3; 18	BRH; 1; 20	BRH; 2; 19	BRH; 3 DSQ	RBR; 1; 25	RBR; 2; 14	RBR; 3 Ret	NOR; 1 Ret	NOR; 2; 22	NOR; 3; 17	NÜR; 1; 12	NÜR; 2; 14	NÜR; 3; 8	ZAN; 1; 12	ZAN; 2; 9	ZAN; 3; 10	VAL; 1; 24	VAL; 2; 14	VAL; 3; 12	HOC; 1; 14	HOC; 2; 17	HOC; 3 Ret				23rd	10
2014	Fortec Motorsport	Mercedes	SIL; 1; 13	SIL; 2; 16	SIL; 3 Ret	HOC; 1; 6	HOC; 2; 11	HOC; 3; 14	PAU; 1 Ret	PAU; 2; 6	PAU; 3; 5	HUN; 1; 9	HUN; 2; 11	HUN; 3; 23	SPA; 1; 20	SPA; 2; 12	SPA; 3; 18	NOR; 1; 11	NOR; 2; 20	NOR; 3; 17	MSC; 1	MSC; 2	MSC; 3	RBR; 1	RBR; 2	RBR; 3	NÜR; 1	NÜR; 2	NÜR; 3	IMO; 1	IMO; 2	IMO; 3	HOC; 1	HOC; 2	HOC; 3	16th	28

^{†} Guest driver, he was ineligible for points.

=== Complete GP3 Series results ===
(key) (Races in bold indicate pole position) (Races in italics indicate fastest lap)

Year	Entrant	1	2	3	4	5	6	7	8	9	10	11	12	13	14	15	16	17	18	Pos	Points
2014	Trident	CAT; FEA	CAT; SPR	RBR; FEA	RBR; SPR	SIL; FEA; DNS	SIL; SPR; DNS	HOC; FEA; 14	HOC; SPR; Ret	HUN; FEA; 20	HUN; SPR; 24	SPA; FEA	SPA; SPR	MNZ; FEA; 18	MNZ; SPR; 20	SOC; FEA; 20	SOC; SPR; 14	YMC; FEA	YMC; SPR	26th	0
2015	Carlin	CAT; FEA; 22†	CAT; SPR; 22	RBR; FEA; Ret	RBR; SPR; 11	SIL; FEA; 21	SIL; SPR; 21	HUN; FEA; 11	HUN; SPR; 10	SPA; FEA; 11	SPA; SPR; 11	MNZ; FEA; 10	MNZ; SPR; 9	SOC; FEA; 12	SOC; SPR; 15	BHR; FEA; 15	BHR; SPR; 11	YMC; FEA; 14	YMC; SPR; 17	22nd	1

^{†} Driver did not finish the race, but was classified as he completed over 90% of the race distance.

=== Complete Indian Racing League results ===
(key) (Races in bold indicate pole position) (Races in italics indicate fastest lap)

Year	Franchise	1	2	3	4	5	6	7	8	9	10	11	12	Pos.	Pts
2022	Speed Demons Delhi	HYD1; 1 C	HYD1; 2 C	HYD1; 3 C	IRU1; 1; 3	IRU1; 2	IRU1; 3 DNS	IRU2; 1	IRU2; 2; 4	IRU2; 3 Ret	HYD2; 1	HYD2; 2 Ret	HYD2; 3 DNS	21st	27
2023‡	Speed Demons Delhi	IRU1; 1	IRU1; 2 Ret	IRU2; 1	IRU2; 2; 5	IRU3; 1	IRU3; 2 Ret							10th	28

‡ Standings based on entry points, not individual drivers.
