= 2010 Silverstone GP2 Series round =

2010 GP2 race held in the United Kingdom

(United Kingdom) 2010 British GP2 round
Round details
- Round 5 of 10 rounds in the 2010 GP2 Series
- Silverstone Circuit
- Location: Silverstone Circuit; Northamptonshire, Britain
- Course: Permanent racing facility 5.901 km (3.667 mi)

GP2 Series

Feature race
- Date: 10 July 2010
- Laps: 33

Pole position
Driver	(France) Jules Bianchi	ART Grand Prix
- Time: 1.39.189

Podium
First	(Venezuela) Pastor Maldonado	Rapax
Second	(France) Jules Bianchi	ART Grand Prix
Third	(Spain) Dani Clos	Racing Engineering

Fastest lap
Driver	(Venezuela) Pastor Maldonado	Rapax
- Time: 1.41.663 (on lap 23)

Sprint race
- Date: 11 July 2010
- Laps: 23

Podium
First	(Mexico) Sergio Pérez	Barwa Addax Team
Second	(United Kingdom) Oliver Turvey	iSport International
Third	(Spain) Dani Clos	Racing Engineering

Fastest lap
Driver	(Mexico) Sergio Pérez	Barwa Addax Team
- Time: 1.41.610 (on lap 6)

The 2010 Silverstone GP2 Series round was a GP2 Series motor race held on July 10 and 11, 2010 at Silverstone Circuit in Silverstone, Britain. It was the fifth round of the 2010 GP2 Series. The race was used to support the 2010 British Grand Prix.

== Report ==
=== Qualifying ===
Jules Bianchi claimed pole for the Feature Race.

=== Feature Race ===
Pastor Maldonado extended his series lead with victory in the Silverstone Feature Race. The Rapax driver jumped polesitter Jules Bianchi (ART) at the start and never looked threatened from there on, gradually extending his advantage to win by 10.1 seconds. Bianchi was second ahead of Racing Engineering's Dani Clos, who came home a further 9.4s down the road. It was a largely processional affair through most of the field, with Bianchi's ART team-mate Sam Bird having an equally straightforward run to fourth, although Sergio Pérez and Christian Vietoris did their best to inject some interest with their scrap for fifth over the second half of the race. Addax driver Pérez finally found a way past the German Racing Engineering man with two laps to go, although sixth was still a good reward for Vietoris after starting from 12th on the grid. iSport's Davide Valsecchi and Oliver Turvey were able to mop up the remaining points when Addax's Giedo van der Garde made a mistake on the final lap while running fifth, allowing Valescchi to pass him immediately and Turvey to follow a couple of corners later to claim pole for the sprint race. Only two cars failed to make the finish, with Rapax's Luiz Razia pulling off the track midway through the race, and DAMS' Ho-Pin Tung retiring after several visits to the pits. Tung had started the race in a brand-new, unliveried chassis that was rushed through scrutineering this morning after destroying his race car in a trip over the kerbs during Friday practice.

=== Sprint Race ===
Sergio Pérez got his season back on track with a crushing win for Addax in the GP2 Series sprint race at Silverstone. The Mexican passed Davide Valsecchi and his iSport team-mate Oliver Turvey in the opening phase of the race and immediately left the rest of the field behind, routinely posting laps more than a second quicker than his rivals to finally cross the line with a margin of 15.7 seconds. Polesitter Turvey managed to hold on for second, earning himself his first GP2 main series podium. He had become the local crowd's only realistic hope of a home podium after ART's Sam Bird was prevented from taking the start by an engine failure on an installation lap. Turvey's result did not come easily. He saw off Valsecchi without difficulty, but soon found himself under pressure from Racing Engineering's Dani Clos, who had made good progress from sixth on the grid. The Spaniard launched several attacks but never managed to find a way through, and after seeing off a late challenge from Pastor Maldonado (Rapax), settled for third. Valsecchi, meanwhile, seemed to be struggling for pace and steadily dropped down the order, losing fifth to ART's Jules Bianchi at Abbey with a couple of laps remaining. He hung on to claim the final point for sixth.

== Classification ==
=== Qualifying ===
Pos	No	Name	Team	Time	Grid
1	1	(France) Jules Bianchi	ART Grand Prix	1:39.189	1
2	15	(Venezuela) Pastor Maldonado	Rapax	1:39.325	2
3	8	(Germany) Christian Vietoris	Racing Engineering	1:39.423	12
4	7	(Spain) Dani Clos	Racing Engineering	1:39.653	3
5	9	(United Kingdom) Oliver Turvey	iSport International	1:39.701	4
6	2	(United Kingdom) Sam Bird	ART Grand Prix	1:39.756	5
7	16	(France) Charles Pic	Arden International Motorsport	1:39.791	6
8	3	(Netherlands) Giedo van der Garde	Barwa Addax Team	1:39.809	7
9	20	(Brazil) Alberto Valerio	Scuderia Coloni	1:39.811	17
10	4	(Mexico) Sergio Pérez	Barwa Addax Team	1:39.894	8
11	10	(Italy) Davide Valsecchi	iSport International	1:39.901	9
12	11	(Belgium) Jérôme d'Ambrosio	DAMS	1:39.941	10
13	5	(Italy) Luca Filippi	Super Nova Racing	1:39.984	11
14	27	(Italy) Giacomo Ricci	DPR	1:40.288	13
15	26	(Romania) Michael Herck	DPR	1:40.342	14
16	6	(Sweden) Marcus Ericsson	Super Nova Racing	1:40.511	15
17	14	(Brazil) Luiz Razia	Rapax	1:40.559	16
18	24	(Venezuela) Johnny Cecotto Jr.	Trident Racing	1:40.747	23
19	25	(South Africa) Adrian Zaugg	Trident Racing	1:40.812	18
20	18	(United Kingdom) Max Chilton	Ocean Racing Technology	1:41.046	19
21	17	(Venezuela) Rodolfo González	Arden International Motorsport	1:41.344	20
22	19	(Switzerland) Fabio Leimer	Ocean Racing Technology	1:41.548	21
23	21	(Bulgaria) Vladimir Arabadzhiev	Scuderia Coloni	1:41.654	22
24	12	(China) Ho-Pin Tung	DAMS	No time	24

- Christian Vietoris, Alberto Valerio and Johnny Cecotto Jr. were penalized ten positions on the starting grid for causing collisions in the previous round's sprint.

=== Feature Race ===
Pos	No	Driver	Team	Laps	Time/Retired	Grid	Points
1	15	(Venezuela) Pastor Maldonado	Rapax	29	50:21.479	2	10 + 1
2	1	(France) Jules Bianchi	ART Grand Prix	29	+10.125	1	8 + 2
3	7	(Spain) Dani Clos	Racing Engineering	29	+19.549	3	6
4	2	(United Kingdom) Sam Bird	ART Grand Prix	29	+20.979	5	5
5	4	(Mexico) Sergio Pérez	Barwa Addax Team	29	+32.039	9	4
6	8	(Germany) Christian Vietoris	Racing Engineering	29	+35.539	13	3
7	10	(Italy) Davide Valsecchi	iSport International	29	+37.702	10	2
8	9	(United Kingdom) Oliver Turvey	iSport International	29	+38.753	4	1
9	3	(Netherlands) Giedo van der Garde	Barwa Addax Team	29	+39.087	7	
10	16	(France) Charles Pic	Arden International Motorsport	29	+39.845	6	
11	11	(Belgium) Jérôme d'Ambrosio	DAMS	29	+40.101	11	
12	6	(Sweden) Marcus Ericsson	Super Nova Racing	29	+53.949	16	
13	27	(Italy) Giacomo Ricci	DPR	29	+54.906	14	
14	20	(Brazil) Alberto Valerio	Scuderia Coloni	29	+1:02.132	8	
15	25	(South Africa) Adrian Zaugg	Trident Racing	29	+1:11.973	19	
16	17	(Venezuela) Rodolfo González	Arden International Motorsport	29	+1:12.825	21	
17	19	(Switzerland) Fabio Leimer	Ocean Racing Technology	29	+1:14.214	22	
18	24	(Venezuela) Johnny Cecotto Jr.	Trident Racing	29	+1:16.113	18	
19	18	(United Kingdom) Max Chilton	Ocean Racing Technology	29	+1:17.805	20	
20	5	(Italy) Luca Filippi	Super Nova Racing	29	+1:33.652	12	
21	21	(Bulgaria) Vladimir Arabadzhiev	Scuderia Coloni	29	+1:34.243	23	
22	26	(Romania) Michael Herck	DPR	28	+1 Lap	15	
Ret	14	(Brazil) Luiz Razia	Rapax	18	Retirement	17	
Ret	12	(China) Ho-Pin Tung	DAMS	12	Retirement	24	

=== Sprint Race ===
Pos	No	Driver	Team	Laps	Time/Retired	Grid	Points
1	4	(Mexico) Sergio Pérez	Barwa Addax Team	21	35:54.531	4	6+1
2	9	(United Kingdom) Oliver Turvey	iSport International	21	+15.386	1	5
3	7	(Spain) Dani Clos	Racing Engineering	21	+15.997	6	4
4	15	(Venezuela) Pastor Maldonado	Rapax	21	+16.426	8	3
5	1	(France) Jules Bianchi	ART Grand Prix	21	+17.600	7	2
6	10	(Italy) Davide Valsecchi	iSport International	21	+21.767	2	1
7	3	(Netherlands) Giedo van der Garde	Barwa Addax Team	21	+22.752	9	
8	16	(France) Charles Pic	Arden International Motorsport	21	+24.207	10	
9	5	(Italy) Luca Filippi	Super Nova Racing	21	+24.483	20	
10	8	(Germany) Christian Vietoris	Racing Engineering	21	+25.057	3	
11	11	(Belgium) Jérôme d'Ambrosio	DAMS	21	+25.853	11	
12	27	(Italy) Giacomo Ricci	DPR	21	+25.977	13	
13	19	(Switzerland) Fabio Leimer	Ocean Racing Technology	21	+30.192	17	
14	26	(Romania) Michael Herck	DPR	21	+30.507	22	
15	12	(China) Ho-Pin Tung	DAMS	21	+30.903	24	
16	14	(Brazil) Luiz Razia	Rapax	21	+45.728	23	
17	21	(Bulgaria) Vladimir Arabadzhiev	Scuderia Coloni	21	+48.713	21	
18	6	(Sweden) Marcus Ericsson	Super Nova Racing	21	+49.956	12	
19	18	(United Kingdom) Max Chilton	Ocean Racing Technology	21	+50.214	19	
20	17	(Venezuela) Rodolfo González	Arden International Motorsport	21	+55.456	16	
21	25	(South Africa) Adrian Zaugg	Trident Racing	21	+1:19.313	15	
22	20	(Brazil) Alberto Valerio	Scuderia Coloni	20	+1 lap	14	
23	24	(Venezuela) Johnny Cecotto Jr.	Trident Racing	19	+2 laps	18	
DNS	2	(United Kingdom) Sam Bird	ART Grand Prix	0	Did not start	5	

== Standings after the round ==
Drivers' Championship standings

Pos	Driver	Points
1	(Venezuela) Pastor Maldonado	56
2	(Spain) Dani Clos	36
3	(France) Jules Bianchi	31
4	(Mexico) Sergio Pérez	30
5	(Netherlands) Giedo van der Garde	27

Teams' Championship standings

Pos	Team	Points
1	(Italy) Rapax	76
2	(Spain) Barwa Addax Team	57
3	(France) ART Grand Prix	53
4	(Spain) Racing Engineering	42
5	(United Kingdom) iSport International	29

- Note: Only the top five positions are included for both sets of standings.

== See also ==
- 2010 British Grand Prix
- 2010 Silverstone GP3 Series round

Previous round: 2010 Valencian GP2 round	GP2 Series; 2010 season	Next round: 2010 German GP2 round
Previous round: 2009 British GP2 round	British GP2 round	Next round: 2011 British GP2 round
