= 2010 Valencia GP2 Series round =

Motor race held in Valencia, Spain in 2010

(Spain) 2010 Valencia GP2 round
Round details
- Round 4 of 10 rounds in the 2010 GP2 Series
- Circuit de Valencia
- Location: Valencia Street Circuit; Valencia, Spain
- Course: Street course 5.34 km (3.32 mi)

GP2 Series

Feature race
- Date: 26 June 2010
- Laps: 31

Pole position
Driver	(Mexico) Sergio Pérez	Barwa Addax Team
- Time: 1:45.337

Podium
First	(Venezuela) Pastor Maldonado	Rapax
Second	(France) Jules Bianchi	ART Grand Prix
Third	(United Kingdom) Sam Bird	ART Grand Prix

Fastest lap
Driver	(Venezuela) Pastor Maldonado	Rapax
- Time: 1:47.528 (on lap 16)

Sprint race
- Date: 27 June 2010
- Laps: 21

Podium
First	(Sweden) Marcus Ericsson	Super Nova Racing
Second	(Netherlands) Giedo van der Garde	Barwa Addax Team
Third	(Romania) Michael Herck	DPR

Fastest lap
Driver	(Venezuela) Pastor Maldonado	Rapax
- Time: 1:47.656 (on lap 17)

The 2010 Valencia GP2 Series round was a GP2 Series motor race held on June 26 and June 27, 2010, at the Valencia Street Circuit in Valencia, Spain. It was the fourth round of the 2010 GP2 Series. The race was used to support the 2010 European Grand Prix.

== Report ==
=== Feature Race ===
Pastor Maldonado strengthened his championship aspirations after winning a bizarre feature race at Valencia. The Rapax driver got past ART's Jules Bianchi at the start to go into the first corner in second place behind polesitter Sergio Pérez, but a series of accidents behind him eliminated nearly half the field in the first four corners. A safety car was brought out while the mess was cleaned up and just 13 of the 24 cars were still on the track for the restart three laps later, although Ocean's Fabio Leimer and Trident's Adrian Zaugg were also able to rejoin after pitting for repairs. But there was more drama to come before the race returned to green. Maldonado went wide at the final corner and Bianchi, taking advantage of the fact that the safety car line is before the start-finish line, was able to take the Venezuelan by surprise and pass him for second. Bianchi made a successful move on Pérez for the lead not long afterwards, but Davide Valsecchi's attempt to follow him through resulted in contact with Pérez that spun the Addax car and left the Mexican at the back of the field. Valsecchi was later handed a drive-through penalty for his part in the incident. Maldonado piled the pressure on Bianchi until the ART driver ran wide, and then gradually pulled away to secure the win by 8.2s. Bianchi followed him for second and Sam Bird made it an ART 2–3 by finishing third; the Brit having started from 10th on the grid. Giedo van der Garde (Addax) and Dani Clos (Racing Engineering) had an uneventful run to fourth and fifth, while Charles Pic (Arden), Marcus Ericsson (Super Nova) and Michael Herck (DPR) chased each other around to complete the points. It was a particularly welcome result for Ericsson, whose efforts finally helped Super Nova to get its first points of the year. There was one more bit of drama awaiting Pérez when he went to leave the pits and found Coloni's Alberto Valerio pulling out ahead of him with the rear jack still attached. It flew off at turn 4, fortunately bouncing out of Pérez's path and instead wiping out a TV camera mounted on the catch fencing.

=== Sprint Race ===
Marcus Ericsson took his first-ever GP2 win in the sprint race in Valencia. The Swede took the lead at the start by beating pole-sitter Michael Herck into the first corner, but faced a determined challenge from Giedo van der Garde over the last two laps. Despite van der Garde's apparent speed advantage, Ericsson did just enough to keep him at bay. While the win was a welcome change of form for the Super Nova team after a tough start to the season, there is also concern within the squad after Ericsson's teammate Josef Kral was taken to hospital following a huge accident on lap three. The Czech driver ran into the back of Arden's Rodolfo González and was launched skyward before landing on his gearbox and slamming into the Turn 17 barriers at high speed. He was taken to Hospital complaining of pain in his back and right arm, but was found to be unharmed seriously. He would return to GP2 at the last round of the season in Abu Dhabi. The accident prompted several laps behind the safety car, which eventually led to the race being flagged several laps before schedule due to time limitations. Herck held on to third, although he needed to shove Pastor Maldonado aside on the run to the finish line in order to do it, while Charles Pic and Davide Valsecchi scored the final points. Sergio Pérez endured another disastrous race; the Mexican being one of several victims of opening lap damage when he was hit by Alberto Valerio. He lost a lap but found himself out of sequence behind the safety car and spent the middle part of the race running fourth on the road ahead of title rival Maldonado. Pérez had just enough time to produce the fastest lap of the race - by a full second - before he was dealt a drive-through penalty for ignoring blue flags.

== Classification ==
=== Qualifying ===
Pos	No	Name	Team	Time	Grid
1	4	(Mexico) Sergio Pérez	Barwa Addax Team	1:45.337	1
2	15	(Venezuela) Pastor Maldonado	Rapax	1:45.462	2
3	1	(France) Jules Bianchi	ART Grand Prix	1:45.658	3
4	10	(Italy) Davide Valsecchi	iSport International	1:45.898	4
5	3	(Netherlands) Giedo van der Garde	Barwa Addax Team	1:45.995	5
6	26	(Romania) Michael Herck	DPR	1:46.117	6
7	16	(France) Charles Pic	Arden International Motorsport	1:46.171	7
8	8	(Germany) Christian Vietoris	Racing Engineering	1:46.263	8
9	27	(Italy) Giacomo Ricci	DPR	1:46.358	9
10	2	(United Kingdom) Sam Bird	ART Grand Prix	1:46.362	10
11	7	(Spain) Dani Clos	Racing Engineering	1:46.478	11
12	24	(Venezuela) Johnny Cecotto Jr.	Trident Racing	1:46.504	12
13	20	(Brazil) Alberto Valerio	Scuderia Coloni	1:46.508	13
14	14	(Brazil) Luiz Razia	Rapax	1:46.518	14
15	25	(South Africa) Adrian Zaugg	Trident Racing	1:46.532	15
16	9	(United Kingdom) Oliver Turvey	iSport International	1:46.633	16
17	5	(Czech Republic) Josef Král	Super Nova Racing	1:46.709	17
18	11	(Belgium) Jérôme d'Ambrosio	DAMS	1:46.743	18
19	6	(Sweden) Marcus Ericsson	Super Nova Racing	1:46.756	24^{1}
20	12	(China) Ho-Pin Tung	DAMS	1:46.780	19
21	21	(Bulgaria) Vladimir Arabadzhiev	Scuderia Coloni	1:46.868	20
22	17	(Venezuela) Rodolfo González	Arden International Motorsport	1:46.953	21
23	19	(Switzerland) Fabio Leimer	Ocean Racing Technology	1:47.011	22
24	18	(United Kingdom) Max Chilton	Ocean Racing Technology	1:47.054	23

Notes

1. - Marcus Ericsson received a ten-place grid penalty because of a collision with Adrian Zaugg in Istanbul.

=== Feature Race ===
Pos	No	Driver	Team	Laps	Time/Retired	Grid	Points
1	15	(Venezuela) Pastor Maldonado	Rapax	30	0:56:55.681	2	10 + 1
2	1	(France) Jules Bianchi	ART Grand Prix	30	+8.296	3	8
3	2	(United Kingdom) Sam Bird	ART Grand Prix	30	+16.094	10	6
4	3	(Netherlands) Giedo van der Garde	Barwa Addax Team	30	+16.788	5	5
5	7	(Spain) Dani Clos	Racing Engineering	30	+38.974	11	4
6	16	(France) Charles Pic	Arden International Motorsport	30	+42.415	7	3
7	6	(Sweden) Marcus Ericsson	Super Nova Racing	30	+42.914	24	2
8	26	(Romania) Michael Herck	DPR	30	+43.722	6	1
9	20	(Brazil) Alberto Valerio	Scuderia Coloni	30	+48.508	13	
10	10	(Italy) Davide Valsecchi	iSport International	30	+50.411	4	
11	4	(Mexico) Sergio Pérez	Barwa Addax Team	30	+51.308	1	2
12	8	(Germany) Christian Vietoris	Racing Engineering	30	+55.338	8	
13	21	(Bulgaria) Vladimir Arabadzhiev	Scuderia Coloni	29	+1 lap/DNF	20	
14	25	(South Africa) Adrian Zaugg	Trident Racing	29	+1 lap	15	
Ret	19	(Switzerland) Fabio Leimer	Ocean Racing Technology	25	Retired	22	
Ret	27	(Italy) Giacomo Ricci	DPR	0	Accident	9	
Ret	24	(Venezuela) Johnny Cecotto Jr.	Trident Racing	0	Accident	12	
Ret	14	(Brazil) Luiz Razia	Rapax	0	Accident	14	
Ret	9	(United Kingdom) Oliver Turvey	iSport International	0	Accident	16	
Ret	5	(Czech Republic) Josef Král	Super Nova Racing	0	Accident	17	
Ret	11	(Belgium) Jérôme d'Ambrosio	DAMS	0	Accident	18	
Ret	12	(China) Ho-Pin Tung	DAMS	0	Accident	19	
Ret	17	(Venezuela) Rodolfo González	Arden International Motorsport	0	Accident	21	
Ret	18	(United Kingdom) Max Chilton	Ocean Racing Technology	0	Accident	23	

=== Sprint Race ===
Pos	No	Driver	Team	Laps	Time/Retired	Grid	Points
1	6	(Sweden) Marcus Ericsson	Super Nova Racing	22	0:45:33.442	2	6
2	3	(Netherlands) Giedo van der Garde	Barwa Addax Team	22	+0.883	5	5
3	26	(Romania) Michael Herck	DPR	22	+5.120	1	4
4	15	(Venezuela) Pastor Maldonado	Rapax	22	+5.292	8	3 + 1
5	16	(France) Charles Pic	Arden International Motorsport	22	+9.233	3	2
6	10	(Italy) Davide Valsecchi	iSport International	22	+17.778	10	1
7	7	(Spain) Dani Clos	Racing Engineering	22	+18.315	4	
8	11	(Belgium) Jérôme d'Ambrosio	DAMS	22	+18.910	19	
9	21	(Bulgaria) Vladimir Arabadzhiev	Scuderia Coloni	22	+21.318	23	
10	2	(United Kingdom) Sam Bird	ART Grand Prix	22	+23.831	6	
11	18	(United Kingdom) Max Chilton	Ocean Racing Technology	22	+25.997	22	
12	9	(United Kingdom) Oliver Turvey	iSport International	22	+30.387	18	
13	12	(China) Ho-Pin Tung	DAMS	22	+32.713	20	
14	24	(Venezuela) Johnny Cecotto Jr.	Trident Racing	22	+33.394	16	
15	25	(South Africa) Adrian Zaugg	Trident Racing	21	+1 lap	13	
16	4	(Mexico) Sergio Pérez	Barwa Addax Team	21	+1 lap	11	
Ret	14	(Brazil) Luiz Razia	Rapax	15	Retired	17	
Ret	17	(Venezuela) Rodolfo González	Arden International Motorsport	1	Retired	21	
Ret	5	(Czech Republic) Josef Král	Super Nova Racing	1	Retired	24	
Ret	1	(France) Jules Bianchi	ART Grand Prix	0	Retired	7	
Ret	20	(Brazil) Alberto Valerio	Scuderia Coloni	0	Retired	9	
Ret	8	(Germany) Christian Vietoris	Racing Engineering	0	Retired	12	
Ret	19	(Switzerland) Fabio Leimer	Ocean Racing Technology	0	Retired	14	
Ret	27	(Italy) Giacomo Ricci	DPR	0	Retired	15	

== Standings after the round ==
Drivers' Championship standings

Pos	Driver	Points
1	(Venezuela) Pastor Maldonado	42
2	(Spain) Dani Clos	27
3	(Netherlands) Giedo van der Garde	27
4	(Brazil) Luiz Razia	20
5	(Mexico) Sergio Pérez	19

Teams' Championship standings

Pos	Team	Points
1	(Italy) Rapax	62
2	(Spain) Barwa Addax Team	46
3	(France) ART Grand Prix	36
4	(Spain) Racing Engineering	29
5	(United Kingdom) iSport International	20

- Note: Only the top five positions are included for both sets of standings.

== See also ==
- 2010 European Grand Prix
- 2010 Valencia GP3 Series round

Previous round: 2010 Turkish GP2 round	GP2 Series; 2010 season	Next round: 2010 British GP2 round
Previous round: 2009 Valencian GP2 round	Valencia GP2 round	Next round: 2011 Valencian GP2 round
