= 2010 Hungaroring GP2 Series round =

Car race

(Hungary) 2010 Hungarian GP2 round
Round details
- Round 7 of 10 rounds in the 2010 GP2 Series
- The Hungaroring
- Location: Hungaroring, Mogyoród, Pest, Hungary
- Course: Permanent racing facility 4.381 km (2.724 mi)

GP2 Series

Feature race
- Date: 31 July 2010
- Laps: 42

Pole position
Driver	(United Kingdom) Sam Bird	ART Grand Prix
- Time: 1:27.864

Podium
First	(Venezuela) Pastor Maldonado	Rapax
Second	(Germany) Christian Vietoris	Racing Engineering
Third	(Mexico) Sergio Pérez	Barwa Addax Team

Fastest lap
Driver	(Venezuela) Pastor Maldonado	Rapax
- Time: 1:30.767 (on lap 21)

Sprint race
- Date: 1 August 2010
- Laps: 28

Podium
First	(Italy) Giacomo Ricci	DPR
Second	(Germany) Christian Vietoris	Racing Engineering
Third	(Italy) Davide Valsecchi	iSport International

Fastest lap
Driver	(Romania) Michael Herck	DPR
- Time: 1:30.764 (on lap 7)

The 2010 Hungarian GP2 round was a GP2 Series motor race held on July 31 and August 1, 2010, at Hungaroring in Mogyoród, Pest, Hungary. It was the seventh round of the 2010 GP2 Season. The race was used to support the 2010 Hungarian Grand Prix.

== Report ==
=== Feature Race ===
Pastor Maldonado took the GP2 Series feature race win at the Hungaroring to take his fifth feature race victory in succession, extending his record. Maldonado crossed the line 5.8s clear of Racing Engineering rookie Christian Vietoris, but a lot of the hard work was done for him at the start when both of the front-row qualifiers failed to get away from the grid. iSport's Davide Valsecchi was the first victim when his car stopped on the dummy grid, prompting a formation lap. The cars had barely finished forming up for the second time when pole-sitter Sam Bird waved his arms in the air, forcing him to join Valsecchi and fellow grid-staller Adrian Zaugg of Trident in starting from the pit exit. That effectively gave iSport's Oliver Turvey and Maldonado a front-row start, and when Turvey made a poor getaway Maldonado had a virtually unchallenged run into the first corner. The race was interrupted yet again when ART's Jules Bianchi went wide on the exit of Turn 2, lost control, and spun back into the pack. He tagged Racing Engineering's Dani Clos, who was able to continue, but was then flicked around and was hit head-on by DAMS' Ho-Pin Tung, who in turn was rear-ended by Arden's Rodolfo González. The accident triggered a lengthy red flag period while Tung was extracted from his car and airlifted to hospital, while Bianchi was taken to the circuit medical centre. Initial reports were that neither driver was seriously hurt, yet Bianchi was later said to have back pains, making him doubtful for the Belgian round. Maldonado was again swiftly in control when the race restarted and had built up a substantial gap when the safety car was brought out following a clash between Coloni's Alberto Valerio and Rapax's Luiz Razia that ended with Valerio stranded at the final corner. Luck was on Maldonado's side though, as he had the lapped car of Vladimir Arabadzhiev between him and Vietoris, and an awful restart from the Bulgarian allowed Maldonado to pull out more than 3.0s on the first lap back under greens. From there, the win was a formality. Vietoris had to work hard for second, the German spending virtually the entire race under pressure from Addax's Sergio Pérez, with Turvey also joining the fight in the final laps. Pérez's team-mate Giedo van der Garde took fifth ahead of DAMS's Jérôme d'Ambrosio, the Belgian back in the car after missing the Hockenheim round, while DPR locked out the front row for the sprint race with Michael Herck and Giacomo Ricci taking seventh and eighth respectively.

=== Sprint Race ===
DPR's Giacomo Ricci took his first victory in the GP2 main series in the sprint race at the Hungaroring. The Italian started from pole and had the front row to himself after team-mate Michael Herck stalled on the dummy grid. He was challenged into the first corner by DAMS' Jerome d'Ambrosio, but once he had seen that off he was able to cruise to the flag to secure DPR's first main series win since Oliver Pla's victory in Germany in 2005. D'Ambrosio had no answer to Ricci's pace, but the Belgian still looked good for second until his car developed a problem and he was forced to retire midway through the race. That opened the door for Racing Engineering's Christian Vietoris to claim second place, the German having done a great job after starting from seventh on the grid, while iSport's Davide Valsecchi made a nice move down the inside of Giedo van der Garde (Addax) to secure third with three laps to go. Oliver Turvey finished fifth for iSport ahead of Super Nova's Luca Filippi, the Italian taking his first point since returning to the series at Silverstone. It was a tough race for the main title protagonists. Pastor Maldonado (Rapax) was black-flagged on lap seven for ignoring a black and orange warning flag after breaking his front wing, while Addax's Sergio Pérez eliminated himself when an attempt to pass Valsecchi for fifth on the second lap resulted in contact.

== See also ==
- 2010 Hungarian Grand Prix
- 2010 Hungaroring GP3 Series round

Previous round: 2010 German GP2 round	GP2 Series; 2010 season	Next round: 2010 Belgian GP2 round
Previous round: 2009 Hungarian GP2 round	Hungarian GP2 round	Next round: 2011 Hungarian GP2 round
