= 2010 Monza GP2 Series round =

Motor race

(Italy) 2010 Italian GP2 round
Round details
- Round 9 of 10 rounds in the 2010 GP2 Series
- Autodromo Nazionale Monza
- Location: Autodromo Nazionale Monza, Monza, Italy
- Course: Permanent racing facility 5.793 km (3.6 mi)

GP2 Series

Feature race
- Date: 11 September 2010
- Laps: 32

Pole position
Driver	(France) Jules Bianchi	ART Grand Prix
- Time: 1:30.269

Podium
First	(United Kingdom) Sam Bird	ART Grand Prix
Second	(France) Jules Bianchi	ART Grand Prix
Third	(United Kingdom) Oliver Turvey	iSport International

Fastest lap
Driver	(United Kingdom) Sam Bird	ART Grand Prix
- Time: 1:32.438 (on lap 17)

Sprint race
- Date: 12 September 2010
- Laps: 21

Podium
First	(Germany) Christian Vietoris	Racing Engineering
Second	(Belgium) Jérôme d'Ambrosio	DAMS
Third	(United Kingdom) Sam Bird	ART Grand Prix

Fastest lap
Driver	(United Kingdom) Sam Bird	ART Grand Prix
- Time: 1:31.954 (on lap 9)

The 2010 Italian GP2 round was a GP2 Series motor race held on September 11 and 12, 2010 at the Autodromo Nazionale Monza, Monza, in Italy. It was the ninth and penultimate round of the 2010 GP2 Series. The race was run in support of the 2010 Italian Grand Prix.

== Report ==
=== Feature Race ===
Englishman Sam Bird claimed his maiden GP2 win in fine style, keeping his head through the chaos all round him to claim the chequered flag ahead of ART team-mate Jules Bianchi and countryman Oliver Turvey, while series leader Pastor Maldonado put one hand on the trophy when Sergio Pérez was punted out of the race on the third lap. Lights out and the ART pair had slow but solid starts: Bird was better placed for turn one and when Bianchi cut the corner slightly the lead was his. Behind them chaos was descending, with Alvaro Parente and Dani Clos cutting the kerb (for later drive through penalties) ahead of a drag to the next chicane, where Luca Filippi ran too deep and took out Giedo van der Garde, prompting a safety car to clean up the mess. Immediately at the restart 2 laps later Jerome d'Ambrosio thought he'd found Bianchi napping and ran outside him at turn one before being pushed wide, with the subsequent accordion affect at the tight corner causing Romain Grosjean to stop sharply. Maldonado had nowhere to go but over his wheel, with collisions behind them stopping team-mate Luiz Razia, Marcus Ericsson and Brendan Hartley, prompting another safety car period.

Straight after the next restart Bianchi out dragged Parente to regain P2 into the first chicane, but at Ascari Michael Herck braked late and extinguished Perez's championship run against the tyre barrier. A lap later Venezuelan pitted to check for damage, with Christian Vietoris going for the early stop to push up the grid at the same time, but two laps later Maldonado was back in and mobbed by his team as he got out of the car, while on track the remaining drivers found space around them as they followed their pre-planned pit strategies. At the end it was Bird who claimed the top step of the podium from team-mate Bianchi by 8.5 seconds, with Turvey driving another sensible race to join the ART pair upstairs. Behind them Vietoris' early stop paid dividends, pushing him up to fourth despite finishing the first lap in P12, with d'Ambrosio recovering to follow him home in fifth. Trident drivers Adrian Zaugg and Edoardo Piscopo delighted their mechanics by finishing sixth and seventh respectively, just ahead of Max Chilton.

=== Sprint Race ===
Christian Vietoris took his maiden main series win in the sprint race. He had a storming start which caught many of his rivals napping, and a controlled drive thereafter under extreme pressure, to greet the chequered flag ahead of Jerome d'Ambrosio and Sam Bird, while Pastor Maldonado failed to finish but nevertheless claimed the 2010 GP2 Series driver's championship. The victory was set up as the lights went out: with the front row starters very slow to get away, Vietoris made a flyer and threaded the needle to lead the field into the first turn before tearing away into the distance. Adrian Zaugg also made a good getaway but was unable to find a way through, dropping back as d'Ambrosio went wide around everyone to slot into second behind the German. Further back and the championship looked to be over when Sergio Pérez braked heavily and ran wide and through the gravel at the Parabolica, with Pastor Maldonado two cars back seemingly following in his rival's tracks. The Mexican held on to narrowly miss the wall and find his way back onto circuit, but the Venezuelan was less lucky and found the wall for the third time in the weekend. Bird was looking to cap off his best weekend of the season in style: a sharp getaway had him up to fourth on the road from eighth on the grid, and he quickly dispatched pole man Max Chilton at the first chicane next time through for a podium spot.

His team-mate Jules Bianchi found his way by Chilton two laps later, but he didn't seem to have the pace of his team-mate in race conditions here, dropping time while Bird ran a string of fastest laps to catch up to the leading pair. The Englishman soon caught up to d'Ambrosio, but the nature of the fast flowing circuit meant there was little chance of a pass unless someone made a mistake. With the top three running nose to tail for the remainder of the race Vietoris held on for the win one second ahead of d'Ambrosio, who took second by just one tenth from Bird. Bianchi solidified third in the championship with another points finish for fourth, with Chilton hanging on for fifth against race long pressure from Oliver Turvey. But with Perez unable to improve on 13th position the championship finally belonged to Maldonado, who took the title with two races to go.

== See also ==
- 2010 Italian Grand Prix
- 2010 Monza GP3 Series round

Previous round: 2010 Belgian GP2 round	GP2 Series; 2010 season	Next round: 2010 Abu Dhabi GP2 round
Previous round: 2009 Italian GP2 round	Italian GP2 round	Next round: 2011 Italian GP2 round
