= 2010 Yas Marina GP2 Series round =

Car racing competition

(United Arab Emirates) 2010 Abu Dhabi GP2 round
Round details
- Round 10 of 10 rounds in the 2010 GP2 Series
- Yas Marina Circuit
- Location: Yas Marina Circuit, Abu Dhabi, United Arab Emirates
- Course: Permanent racing facility 5.554 km (3.451 mi)

GP2 Series

Feature race
- Date: 13 November 2010
- Laps: 31

Pole position
Driver	(United Kingdom) Oliver Turvey	iSport International
- Time: 1:48.559

Podium
First	(Mexico) Sergio Pérez	Barwa Addax Team
Second	(United Kingdom) Oliver Turvey	iSport International
Third	(United Kingdom) Sam Bird	ART Grand Prix

Fastest lap
Driver	(Mexico) Sergio Pérez	Barwa Addax Team
- Time: 1:50.749 (on lap 30)

Sprint race
- Date: 14 November 2010
- Laps: 22

Podium
First	(Italy) Davide Valsecchi	iSport International
Second	(Brazil) Luiz Razia	Rapax
Third	(France) Romain Grosjean	DAMS

Fastest lap
Driver	(Brazil) Luiz Razia	Rapax
- Time: 1:50.841 (on lap 22)

The 2010 Abu Dhabi GP2 round was a GP2 Series motor race held on November 12–14, 2010 at the Yas Marina Circuit, Abu Dhabi, in the United Arab Emirates. It was the tenth and final round of the 2010 GP2 Season. The race was used to support the 2010 Abu Dhabi Grand Prix.

This race was the last for the Dallara GP2/08 chassis that was introduced in 2008 and also for Bridgestone as the sole tyre supplier for the GP2 Series and Formula One. The Dallara GP2/11 chassis was introduced for 2011, and would be used until the end of 2017. Pirelli was also chosen as the sole tyre supplier for GP2 and Formula One from 2011.

== Classification ==
=== Qualifying ===
Pos	No	Name	Team	Time	Grid
1	9	(United Kingdom) Oliver Turvey	iSport International	1:48.559	1
2	7	(Spain) Dani Clos	Racing Engineering	1:49.035	11^{1}
3	4	(Mexico) Sergio Pérez	Barwa Addax Team	1:49.081	2
4	19	(Switzerland) Fabio Leimer	Ocean Racing Technology	1:49.148	3
5	10	(Italy) Davide Valsecchi	iSport International	1:49.307	4
6	1	(France) Jules Bianchi	ART Grand Prix	1:49.338	14^{1}
7	14	(Brazil) Luiz Razia	Rapax	1:49.410	5
8	3	(Netherlands) Giedo van der Garde	Barwa Addax Team	1:49.429	16^{1}
9	12	(France) Romain Grosjean	DAMS	1:49.462	6
10	13	(United Kingdom) Sam Bird	ART Grand Prix	1:49.624	18^{1}
11	25	(South Africa) Adrian Zaugg	Trident Racing	1:49.812	7
12	18	(United Kingdom) Max Chilton	Ocean Racing Technology	1:49.890	8
13	26	(Romania) Michael Herck	DPR	1:50.160	9
14	27	(Italy) Fabrizio Crestani	DPR	1:50.239	10
15	15	(Venezuela) Pastor Maldonado	Rapax	1:50.362	22^{1}
16	17	(Venezuela) Rodolfo González	Arden International Motorsport	1:50.549	12
17	5	(Czech Republic) Josef Král	Super Nova Racing	1:50.559	13
18	21	(New Zealand) Brendon Hartley	Scuderia Coloni	1:50.568	15
19	16	(France) Charles Pic	Arden International Motorsport	1:50.569	17
20	6	(Sweden) Marcus Ericsson	Super Nova Racing	1:50.719	19
21	11	(Belgium) Jérôme d'Ambrosio	DAMS	1:50.730	24^{1}
22	20	(United Kingdom) James Jakes	Scuderia Coloni	1:50.901	20
23	8	(China) Ho-Pin Tung	Racing Engineering	1:51.061	21
24	24	(Italy) Federico Leo	Trident Racing	1:52.170	23

Notes

1. – Dani Clos, Jules Bianchi, Pastor Maldonado, Sam Bird, Jérôme d’Ambrosio and Giedo van der Garde were handed ten grid position penalties after failing to heed the pitlane red light at the end of the qualifying session.

=== Feature Race ===
Pos	No	Driver	Team	Laps	Time/Retired	Grid	Points
1	4	(Mexico) Sergio Pérez	Barwa Addax Team	31	59:53.752	2	10+1
2	9	(United Kingdom) Oliver Turvey	iSport International	31	+21.065	1	8+2
3	2	(United Kingdom) Sam Bird	ART Grand Prix	31	+29.695	18	6
4	7	(Spain) Dani Clos	Racing Engineering	31	+30.442	11	5
5	10	(Italy) Davide Valsecchi	iSport International	31	+36.614	4	4
6	12	(France) Romain Grosjean	DAMS	31	+38.175	6	3
7	14	(Brazil) Luiz Razia	Rapax	31	+39.196	5	2
8	5	(Czech Republic) Josef Král	Super Nova Racing	31	+39.724	13	1
9	21	(New Zealand) Brendon Hartley	Scuderia Coloni	31	+40.679	15	
10	17	(Venezuela) Rodolfo González	Arden International Motorsport	31	+49.704	12	
11	6	(Sweden) Marcus Ericsson	Super Nova Racing	31	+55.360	19	
12	18	(United Kingdom) Max Chilton	Ocean Racing Technology	31	+57.925	8	
13	27	(Italy) Fabrizio Crestani	DPR	31	+58.334	10	
14	11	(Belgium) Jérôme d'Ambrosio	DAMS	31	+58.836	24	
15	20	(United Kingdom) James Jakes	Scuderia Coloni	31	+1:01.227	20	
16	26	(Romania) Michael Herck	DPR	31	+1:02.178	9	
17	15	(Venezuela) Pastor Maldonado	Rapax	31	+1:14.109	22	
18	1	(France) Jules Bianchi	ART Grand Prix	31	+1:29.646	14	
19	24	(Italy) Federico Leo	Trident Racing	31	+1:36.305	23	
20	16	(France) Charles Pic	Arden International Motorsport	30	+1 lap	17	
Ret	8	(China) Ho-Pin Tung	Racing Engineering	11	Retired	21	
Ret	19	(Switzerland) Fabio Leimer	Ocean Racing Technology	7	Retired	3	
Ret	25	(South Africa) Adrian Zaugg	Trident Racing	0	Retired	7	
Ret	3	(Netherlands) Giedo van der Garde	Barwa Addax Team	0	Retired	16	

=== Sprint Race ===
Pos	No	Driver	Team	Laps	Time/Retired	Grid	Points
1	10	(Italy) Davide Valsecchi	iSport International	22	40:59.120	4	6
2	14	(Brazil) Luiz Razia	Rapax	22	+0.925	2	5+1
3	12	(France) Romain Grosjean	DAMS	22	+5.107	3	4
4	7	(Spain) Dani Clos	Racing Engineering	22	+5.597	5	3
5	5	(Czech Republic) Josef Král	Super Nova Racing	22	+17.853	1	2
6	21	(New Zealand) Brendon Hartley	Scuderia Coloni	22	+21.924	9	1
7	9	(United Kingdom) Oliver Turvey	iSport International	22	+21.516	7	
8	1	(France) Jules Bianchi	ART Grand Prix	22	+22.567	18	
9	11	(Belgium) Jérôme d'Ambrosio	DAMS	22	+24.665	14	
10	15	(Venezuela) Pastor Maldonado	Rapax	22	+25.171	17	
11	26	(Romania) Michael Herck	DPR	22	+25.672	16	
12	16	(France) Charles Pic	Arden International Motorsport	22	+31.925	20	
13	18	(United Kingdom) Max Chilton	Ocean Racing Technology	22	+35.481	12	
14	8	(China) Ho-Pin Tung	Racing Engineering	22	+36.654	21	
15	27	(Italy) Fabrizio Crestani	DPR	22	+37.828	13	
16	19	(Switzerland) Fabio Leimer	Ocean Racing Technology	22	+38.401	22	
17	17	(Venezuela) Rodolfo González	Arden International Motorsport	22	+38.964	10	
18	20	(United Kingdom) James Jakes	Scuderia Coloni	22	+51.778	15	
19	3	(Netherlands) Giedo van der Garde	Barwa Addax Team	22	+1:16.380	24	
Ret	6	(Sweden) Marcus Ericsson	Super Nova Racing	18	Retired	11	
Ret	24	(Italy) Federico Leo	Trident Racing	10	Retired	19	
Ret	2	(United Kingdom) Sam Bird	ART Grand Prix	4	Retired	6	
Ret	4	(Mexico) Sergio Pérez	Barwa Addax Team	4	Retired	8	
DNS	25	(South Africa) Adrian Zaugg	Trident Racing	0	Did not start	23	

== Standings after the round ==
Drivers' Championship standings

Pos.	Driver	Points
1	(Venezuela) Pastor Maldonado	87
2	(Mexico) Sergio Pérez	71
3	(France) Jules Bianchi	52
4	(Spain) Dani Clos	51
5	(United Kingdom) Sam Bird	48

Teams' Championship standings

Pos.	Team	Points
1	(Italy) Rapax	115
2	(Spain) Barwa Addax Team	110
3	(France) ART Grand Prix	100
4	(Spain) Racing Engineering	80
5	(United Kingdom) iSport International	78

- Note: Only the top five positions are included for both sets of standings.

Previous round: 2010 Italian GP2 round	GP2 Series; 2010 season	Next round: 2011 Turkish GP2 round
Previous round: 2010 Yas Marina GP2 Asia Series round	Abu Dhabi GP2 round	Next round: 2011 Yas Marina Circuit GP2 Asia Series round
