= 2010 Hockenheimring GP2 Series round =

Motor race

(Germany) 2010 German GP2 round
Round details
- Round 6 of 10 rounds in the 2010 GP2 Series
- The Hockenheimring
- Location: Hockenheimring, Hockenheim, Germany
- Course: Permanent racing facility 4.574 km (2.842 mi)

GP2 Series

Feature race
- Date: 24 July 2010
- Laps: 40

Pole position
| Driver | (France) Charles Pic | Arden International |
- Time: 1:41.638

Podium
| First | (Venezuela) Pastor Maldonado | Rapax |
| Second | (Mexico) Sergio Pérez | Barwa Addax Team |
| Third | (France) Charles Pic | Arden International |

Fastest lap
| Driver | (France) Jules Bianchi | ART Grand Prix |
- Time: 1:23.527 (on lap 37)

Sprint race
- Date: 25 July 2010
- Laps: 27

Podium
| First | (Mexico) Sergio Pérez | Barwa Addax Team |
| Second | (United Kingdom) Oliver Turvey | iSport International |
| Third | (South Africa) Adrian Zaugg | Trident Racing |

Fastest lap
| Driver | (Mexico) Sergio Pérez | Barwa Addax Team |
- Time: 1:23.110 (on lap 19)

The 2010 German GP2 round was a GP2 Series motor race held on July 24 and 25, 2010 at Hockenheimring in Hockenheim, Germany. It was the sixth round of the 2010 GP2 Season. The race was used to support the 2010 German Grand Prix. The round marked the return to Hockenheim after the Nürburgring held the previous year's event, due to the German Grand Prix rotation.

== Report ==
=== Feature Race ===
Pastor Maldonado extended his GP2 Series points lead by claiming his fourth victory of the season in the feature race at Hockenheim. The Rapax driver took the lead at the start when polesitter Charles Pic (Arden) was slow off the line, and aside from one lap during the pitstop cycle he led the entire race from there on. Addax's Sergio Pérez gave Maldonado some trouble during the first stint, but all of the Mexican's attempts to get past were easily defended. He was unable to summon the same sort of pace from his second set of tyres though, and Maldonado went on to take a comfortable 3.8-second win, with Pic completing the podium. Dani Clos (Racing Engineering) took fourth, while Jules Bianchi was fifth for ART, taking the fastest lap along the way, with Super Nova's Marcus Ericsson, Trident's Adrian Zaugg and iSport's Oliver Turvey completing the points-scorers. ART's Sam Bird had a nightmare race, starting towards the back of the field after crashing in qualifying and then being given a drivethrough penalty for causing a collision with Giedo van der Garde while fighting the Dutch Addax driver for 10th. It was also a difficult afternoon for series returnee Romain Grosjean, who was hit from behind by Racing Engineering's Christian Vietoris and had to pit for repairs. He rejoined the race three laps down, and DAMS' misery was completed when Ho-Pin Tung retired at mid-distance. The Chinese driver had joined his teammate in the pits at the end of the first lap after breaking his front wing on the Coloni Dallara of Alberto Valerio.

=== Sprint Race ===
Sergio Pérez took his third win of the season in the Hockenheim sprint race, while points leader Pastor Maldonado was eliminated in a late crash. Pérez's victory came fairly easily, the Addax driver picking off Trident's Adrian Zaugg and iSport's Oliver Turvey to take the lead on lap 10, and then building a gap that had grown to 6.3s by the time he took the flag. Polesitter Turvey was initially beaten off the line by Zaugg and Super Nova's Marcus Ericsson, but the Briton reclaimed second from Ericsson on the opening lap and then passed Zaugg for the lead a lap later. Zaugg had no answer to Turvey's pace, but he still had enough to hold on to third and give Trident its first podium since Mike Conway won in Monaco in 2008. But the real story of the race was Romain Grosjean's drive from the back of the field; the Franco-Swiss driver methodically gaining places to eventually find himself on the end of a four-way scrap for fifth with Racing Engineering's Dani Clos, ART's Sam Bird and Maldonado. Grosjean passed Maldonado for seventh with a couple of laps remaining, but things came to a head when Bird dived inside Clos for fifth at the hairpin. Grosjean tried to follow the Briton through and looked to have succeeded, but the opportunistic Maldonado had simultaneously tried to slip to the inside of both of them. Bird made his move stick, but Grosjean and Maldonado collided at the exit of the corner, putting both out of the race. The crash was subject to a post-race investigation by the stewards that the results of which have not yet been released. Bird's drive to fifth had been almost as impressive as Grosjean's effort given that he's started from 14th, and he finished just behind teammate Jules Bianchi. Clos held on for the final point.

== See also ==
- 2010 German Grand Prix
- 2010 Hockenheimring GP3 Series round

| Previous round: 2010 British GP2 round | GP2 Series; 2010 season | Next round: 2010 Hungarian GP2 round |
| Previous round: 2008 Hockenheimring GP2 Series round | Hockenheimring GP2 round | Next round: 2012 Hockenheimring GP2 Series round |
