= 2010 Spa-Francorchamps GP2 Series rounds =

Round 8 of 10 rounds in the 2010 GP2 Series

(Belgium) 2010 Belgian GP2 round
Round details
- Round 8 of 10 rounds in the 2010 GP2 Series
- Spa Francorchamps
- Location: Circuit de Spa-Francorchamps, Francorchamps, Wallonia, Belgium
- Course: Permanent racing facility 7.004 km (4.352 mi)

GP2 Series

Feature race
- Date: 28 August 2010
- Laps: 26

Pole position
Driver	(Romania) Michael Herck	DPR
- Time: 2:15.661

Podium
First	(Venezuela) Pastor Maldonado	Rapax
Second	(Portugal) Álvaro Parente	Scuderia Coloni
Third	(France) Romain Grosjean	DAMS

Fastest lap
Driver	(Italy) Davide Valsecchi	iSport International
- Time: 1:58.285 (on lap 24)

Sprint race
- Date: 29 August 2010
- Laps: 18

Podium
First	(Mexico) Sergio Pérez	Barwa Addax Team
Second	(Netherlands) Giedo van der Garde	Barwa Addax Team
Third	(Portugal) Álvaro Parente	Scuderia Coloni

Fastest lap
Driver	(Mexico) Sergio Pérez	Sergio Pérez
- Time: 1:57.014 (on lap 17)

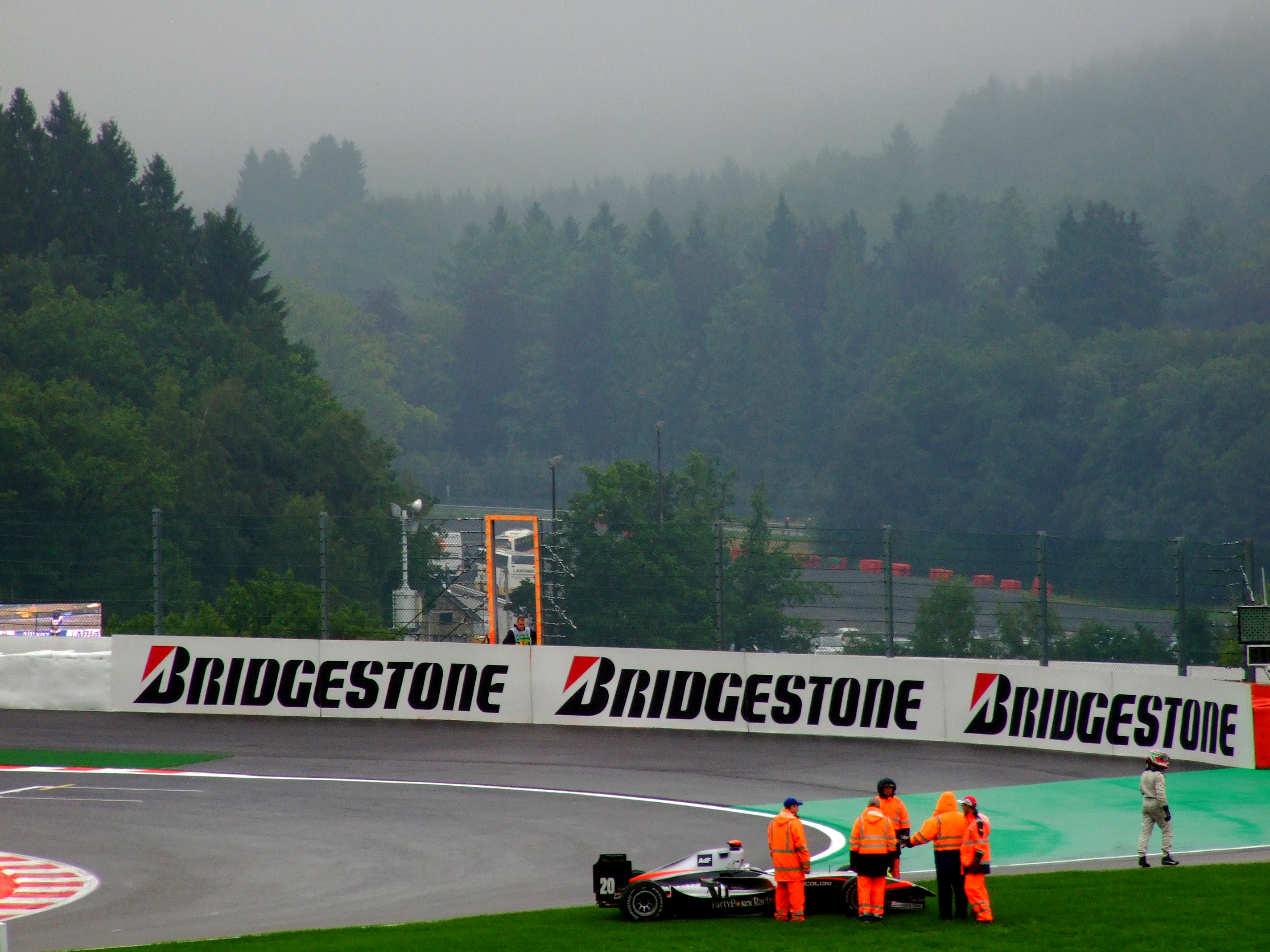
Alvaro Parente walks away from his car in qualifying

The 2010 Belgian GP2 round was a GP2 Series motor race held on August 28 and 29, 2010 at the Circuit de Spa-Francorchamps, near the village of Francorchamps, Wallonia, Belgium. It was the eighth round of the 2010 GP2 Series. The race was run in support of the 2010 Belgian Grand Prix.

== Report ==
=== Qualifying ===
Michael Herck originally scored pole, but the former Belgian was one of a dozen drivers to be penalised after qualifying for going too fast under yellows. Home driver Jérôme d'Ambrosio got pole instead, ahead of championship leader Pastor Maldonado.

=== Feature Race ===
Pastor Maldonado took another feature race victory at Spa-Francorchamps to increase his winning record in the series, although he only just managed to hang on under heavy pressure from Alvaro Parente at the end of the race. The Rapax driver was struggling with his car and almost certainly would not have held off Coloni stand-in Parente for another lap. Parente, who led most of the race before making a late stop, closed rapidly on the series leader during the final lap, but was just too far back to make a move at the Bus Stop. Another stand-in driver, Romain Grosjean (subbing for injured Ho-Pin Tung at DAMS), took third place after fellow podium contenders Jérôme d'Ambrosio and Sergio Pérez ran into trouble. D'Ambrosio, who started on pole but lost the lead to Maldonado when both pitted together, eventually retired. Pérez (Addax) took third on the first lap and kept the spot after the stops, but lost that when he had to serve a drive-through for pitlane speeding. A first-lap accident involving Sam Bird (ART) and Dani Clos (Racing Engineering) caused a safety car interruption, but the race ran green from the restart on lap four. Dani Clos was later diagnosed with a back injury after the race, so missed the Sprint Race. Rodolfo González got 8th, so took sprint race pole, ahead of Giedo van der Garde, who did very well in getting 9th after starting 23rd.

=== Sprint Race ===
Mexico's Sergio Pérez made up for the disappointment in the feature race by taking victory in the reverse-grid GP2 race at Spa-Francorchamps. After starting second, the Addax driver made light work of pole man Rodolfo González (Arden), running much quicker through Eau Rouge and passing him at Les Combes on the first lap. Pérez never relinquished the lead thereafter. The race was punctuated by three safety cars for accidents – including crashes by Christian Vietoris, Charles Pic and Jules Bianchi – and debris on the track. González later dropped behind Pérez's team-mate Giedo van der Garde and feature race runner up Alvaro Parente (Scuderia Coloni). Championship leader Pastor Maldonado retired at Les Combes on the first lap, so Pérez's win keeps his mathematical chance of closing up the Venezuelan's big points lead alive.

== See also ==
- 2010 Belgian Grand Prix
- 2010 Spa-Francorchamps GP3 Series round

Previous round: 2010 Hungarian GP2 round	GP2 Series; 2010 season	Next round: 2010 Italian GP2 round
Previous round: 2009 Belgian GP2 round	Belgian GP2 round	Next round: 2011 Belgian GP2 round
