= 2010 GP2 Series =

Season of Formula One feeder championship

The 2010 GP2 Series season was the forty-fourth season of the second-tier of Formula One feeder championship and also sixth season under the GP2 Series moniker. The season began on 8 May at the Circuit de Catalunya in Montmeló, Spain and ended on 14 November at the Yas Marina Circuit in Abu Dhabi, United Arab Emirates after 20 races held at ten meetings.

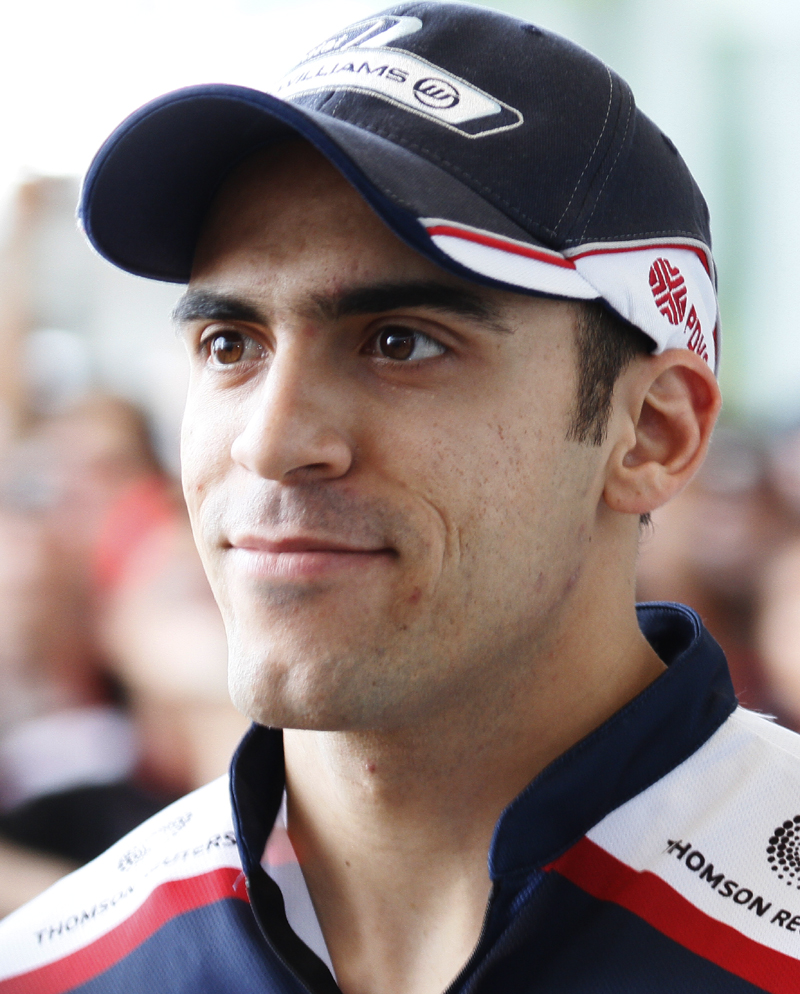
Pastor Maldonado (pictured in 2011), won the championship

This was the first GP2 season held with its own feeder series, the GP3 Series. The 2010 series was at most of the European Formula One rounds with GP2. The German GP2 round returned to Hockenheim, due to its alternation with the Nürburgring as host of the German Grand Prix. Abu Dhabi became a part of the main series, after two races in the 2009–10 GP2 Asia Series. The 2010 season was the last season with the second-generation Dallara GP2/08 car, introduced in 2008. It was also the last season that Bridgestone was the sole tyre supplier for the series, as they were replaced by Pirelli for the following season. The new car – the Dallara GP2/11 – will be utilised in the main series and the GP2 Asia Series from 2011 onwards.

Pastor Maldonado clinched the championship title with two races to spare, despite crashing out of the sprint race at Monza; the second successive season where the drivers' championship was secured before the final round. Maldonado, driving for Rapax, became the series' most successful driver with six victories during the season, gained in successive feature races to take him to a total of ten victories. Maldonado won the championship by sixteen points ahead of Barwa Addax's Sergio Pérez, who took five victories during the season, taking a pair of feature race wins and three sprint wins. Jules Bianchi finished as top main series rookie in third for ART Grand Prix, after coming at the head of a four-driver battle for the position. Dani Clos finished a point behind Bianchi for Racing Engineering, winning a sprint race in Istanbul, with British duo Sam Bird – a race-winner at Monza – and Oliver Turvey taking fifth and sixth places. Seven other drivers took victories, mainly coming in the reverse-grid races; only Charles Pic – tenth overall – took a feature race win in Montmeló. Sprint wins were taken by Fabio Leimer in Montmeló, Jérôme d'Ambrosio in Monaco, Marcus Ericsson in Valencia, Giacomo Ricci in Mogyoród, Christian Vietoris at Monza and Davide Valsecchi in Abu Dhabi.

In the teams' championship, it was Rapax that prevailed in a three-team battle in Abu Dhabi. Heading into the final race, Barwa Addax held a one-point advantage over Rapax, with ART nine points behind Addax in third. In the final race, only Rapax picked up points with a second place with fastest lap for Luiz Razia, which gave Rapax a five-point – 115 points to 110 – championship win over Barwa Addax. ART finished third on 100 points, ahead of Racing Engineering on 80 and iSport International on 78 in fifth position.

== Teams and drivers ==
The season had been expected to see 26 cars running, but ongoing financial problems sidelined Durango indefinitely. As there was a new team-entry-selection process scheduled for 2011, series organisers decided it was not worth a new team joining for a single season, as there would be no guarantee they would be on the grid in 2011.

Team	No.	Driver name	Rounds
(France) ART Grand Prix	1	(France) Jules Bianchi	All
(France) ART Grand Prix	2	(United Kingdom) Sam Bird	All
(Spain) Barwa Addax Team	3	(Netherlands) Giedo van der Garde	All
(Spain) Barwa Addax Team	4	(Mexico) Sergio Pérez	All
(United Kingdom) Super Nova Racing	5	(Czech Republic) Josef Král	1–4, 10
(United Kingdom) Super Nova Racing	5	(Italy) Luca Filippi	5–9
(United Kingdom) Super Nova Racing	6	(Sweden) Marcus Ericsson	All
(Spain) Racing Engineering	7	(Spain) Dani Clos	All
(Spain) Racing Engineering	8	(Germany) Christian Vietoris	1–9
(Spain) Racing Engineering	8	(China) Ho-Pin Tung	10
(United Kingdom) iSport International	9	(United Kingdom) Oliver Turvey	All
(United Kingdom) iSport International	10	(Italy) Davide Valsecchi	All
(France) DAMS	11	(Belgium) Jérôme d'Ambrosio	1–5, 7–10
(France) DAMS	11	(France) Romain Grosjean	6
(France) DAMS	12	(China) Ho-Pin Tung	1–7
(France) DAMS	12	(France) Romain Grosjean	8–10
(Italy) Rapax	14	(Brazil) Luiz Razia	All
(Italy) Rapax	15	(Venezuela) Pastor Maldonado	All
(United Kingdom) Arden International	16	(France) Charles Pic	All
(United Kingdom) Arden International	17	(Venezuela) Rodolfo González	All
(Portugal) Ocean Racing Technology	18	(United Kingdom) Max Chilton	All
(Portugal) Ocean Racing Technology	19	(Switzerland) Fabio Leimer	All
(Italy) Scuderia Coloni	20	(Brazil) Alberto Valerio	1–7
(Italy) Scuderia Coloni	20	(Portugal) Álvaro Parente	8–9
(Italy) Scuderia Coloni	20	(United Kingdom) James Jakes	10
(Italy) Scuderia Coloni	21	(Bulgaria) Vladimir Arabadzhiev	1–8
(Italy) Scuderia Coloni	21	(New Zealand) Brendon Hartley	9–10
(Italy) Trident Racing	24	(Venezuela) Johnny Cecotto Jr.	1–8
(Italy) Trident Racing	24	(Italy) Edoardo Piscopo	9
(Italy) Trident Racing	24	(Italy) Federico Leo	10
(Italy) Trident Racing	25	(South Africa) Adrian Zaugg	All
(United Kingdom) DPR	26	(Romania) Michael Herck	All
(United Kingdom) DPR	27	(Italy) Giacomo Ricci	1–7
(United Kingdom) DPR	27	(Italy) Fabrizio Crestani	8–10

=== Driver changes ===
Changed teams

A number of drivers changed teams over the off-season between the end of the 2009 main series and the 2010 season. David Price Racing driver Johnny Cecotto Jr. moved across to the Trident Racing team, in effect replacing Rodolfo González, who moved across to Arden International. The Barwa Addax Team had two new drivers for the season, with Giedo van der Garde moving from iSport International and Sergio Pérez leaving Arden International to partner him; Addax drivers in 2009, Romain Grosjean and Davide Valsecchi joined DAMS and iSport respectively, Grosjean's signing being in mid-season rather than at the start of the season. Other moves saw Pastor Maldonado leaving ART Grand Prix to join Rapax and was partnered by Luiz Razia who had been a race-winner with Scuderia Coloni in 2009. Alberto Valerio moved the other way to Razia and joined Scuderia Coloni, with Álvaro Parente joining him mid-season having last driven for Ocean Racing Technology twelve months prior.

Entering or Re-Entering GP2

Many drivers joined the series from a raft of other junior formulae series as part of a driver's progression to the higher echelons of professional motor racing. Ho-Pin Tung joined DAMS after a season in Superleague Formula competing in the colours of Turkish side Galatasaray, while James Jakes contested the final meeting at Abu Dhabi after a season competing for Manor Racing in the inaugural GP3 Series. Charles Pic, Oliver Turvey and Adrian Zaugg all moved across from the Formula Renault 3.5 Series via the GP2 Asia winter series to compete in the main series. Each of the drivers remained with the teams they competed in the Asia Series with; Pic with Arden International, Turvey with iSport International and Zaugg with Trident Racing. Brendon Hartley and Federico Leo also joined from the series, but they only contested selected races towards the end of the campaign. Fabrizio Crestani and Edoardo Piscopo both competed for DAMS in Auto GP but also forayed into GP2 with DPR and Trident respectively; Crestani moving into the series for the first time.

The end of the International Formula Master series saw three drivers moving into GP2 from that particular series; champion Fabio Leimer joined Ocean Racing Technology from Jenzer Motorsport, while JD Motorsport team-mates Vladimir Arabadzhiev and Josef Král joined Scuderia Coloni and Super Nova Racing respectively. There was also a number of graduates from the major Formula Three series held around the world. Formula 3 Euro Series champion Jules Bianchi remained with his Formula Three team ART Grand Prix for his graduation into GP2, and was joined by former rival Sam Bird, while runner-up Christian Vietoris joined Racing Engineering. All-Japan Formula Three Championship winner Marcus Ericsson joined Super Nova Racing after one round with the team in GP2 Asia, while British Formula 3 Championship front-runner Max Chilton left Carlin Motorsport to partner Leimer at Ocean Racing Technology.

Leaving GP2

Five drivers left the championship – including the top three drivers – after securing drives in Formula One. Champion Nico Hülkenberg was signed up by Williams F1 to partner Rubens Barrichello, runner-up Vitaly Petrov swapped the Barwa Addax Team for the Renault F1 team to replace Romain Grosjean, and Kamui Kobayashi joined Sauber after several races replacing Timo Glock at Toyota Racing. Karun Chandhok and Lucas di Grassi also graduated, signing for new teams Hispania Racing and Virgin Racing respectively.

Stefano Coletti swapped the Durango team for a place in the Formula Renault 3.5 Series with Comtec Racing, where he was joined by another Durango driver Nelson Panciatici, who signed for Junior Lotus Racing. Franck Perera and Davide Rigon moved back to Superleague Formula, where they would encounter mixed fortunes, with Perera failing to win a race and Rigon becoming season champion. Edoardo Mortara left Arden International for a return to the Formula 3 Euro Series with the crack Signature outfit with whom he had won the Macau Grand Prix with, in 2009. Ricardo Teixeira moved into the FIA Formula Two Championship while Andreas Zuber competed in the inaugural FIA GT1 World Championship with Phoenix Racing / Carsport, as well as a sporadic appearance in the EuroBOSS Series. Diego Nunes returned to Brazil to compete in the Stock Car Brasil series with RC3 Bassani Racing, Javier Villa moved into touring car specification series, competing in the Spanish Mini Championship, while Roldán Rodríguez decided to take a sabbatical from racing after his GP2 Asia campaign.

Midseason Changes

A number of midseason changes were also made during the season, to replace other drivers. Super Nova Racing's Josef Král suffered stable fractures to two of his vertebrae in an accident with Rodolfo González in Valencia. Luca Filippi took his place at Super Nova Racing until Král returned in Abu Dhabi. Romain Grosjean returned to the series, making a one-off appearance at Hockenheim for DAMS. He replaced Jérôme d'Ambrosio at the meeting. After Ho-Pin Tung's injury at the Hungaroring, Grosjean replaced him at Spa-Francorchamps and Monza. Álvaro Parente returned to the series at Spa-Francorchamps replacing Alberto Valerio at Scuderia Coloni. Fabrizio Crestani made his main series début at Spa-Francorchamps replacing compatriot Giacomo Ricci at DPR. Edoardo Piscopo made his main series début at Monza, replacing Johnny Cecotto Jr. at Trident Racing. Brendon Hartley also made his first GP2 appearance at Monza, replacing Vladimir Arabadzhiev at Scuderia Coloni. Ho-Pin Tung made his return from injury at Abu Dhabi, replacing Christian Vietoris after he needed surgery for appendicitis. James Jakes and Federico Leo also their main series débuts in Abu Dhabi, replacing Álvaro Parente at Scuderia Coloni and Edoardo Piscopo at Trident Racing respectively.

== 2010 schedule ==
The 2010 calendar was officially announced on 18 December 2009. The series had been expected to consist of eleven rounds, up one from 2009. It was due to support all the European Formula One events, race at a stand-alone event in Portimão for the second year in a row, and the season finale to be held in Abu Dhabi. On 8 May 2010, it was announced that the Portimão round would be cancelled and not be replaced.

Round		Location	Circuit	Date	Time		Tyres (Note: Bridgestone supplied only one dry compound to the teams to be used throughout the race weekend.)	Supporting
Round		Location	Circuit	Date	Local	UTC	Tyres	Supporting
1	F	Montmeló, Spain	Circuit de Catalunya	8 May	15:40	13:40	Hard	Spanish Grand Prix
1	S	Montmeló, Spain	Circuit de Catalunya	9 May	10:35	08:35	Hard	Spanish Grand Prix
2	F	Monte Carlo, Monaco	Circuit de Monaco	14 May	11:15	09:15	Super Soft	Monaco Grand Prix
2	S	Monte Carlo, Monaco	Circuit de Monaco	15 May	16:10	14:10	Super Soft	Monaco Grand Prix
3	F	Istanbul, Turkey	Istanbul Park	29 May	15:40	12:40	Medium	Turkish Grand Prix
3	S	Istanbul, Turkey	Istanbul Park	30 May	11:35	08:35	Medium	Turkish Grand Prix
4	F	Valencia, Spain	Valencia Street Circuit	26 June	15:40	13:40	Soft	European Grand Prix
4	S	Valencia, Spain	Valencia Street Circuit	27 June	10:35	08:35	Soft	European Grand Prix
5	F	(United Kingdom) Silverstone, Great Britain	Silverstone Circuit	10 July	14:40	13:40	Medium	British Grand Prix
5	S	(United Kingdom) Silverstone, Great Britain	Silverstone Circuit	11 July	09:35	08:35	Medium	British Grand Prix
6	F	Hockenheim, Germany	Hockenheimring	24 July	15:40	13:40	Medium	German Grand Prix
6	S	Hockenheim, Germany	Hockenheimring	25 July	10:35	08:35	Medium	German Grand Prix
7	F	Mogyoród, Hungary	Hungaroring	31 July	15:40	13:40	Soft	Hungarian Grand Prix
7	S	Mogyoród, Hungary	Hungaroring	1 August	10:35	08:35	Soft	Hungarian Grand Prix
8	F	Stavelot, Belgium	Circuit de Spa-Francorchamps	28 August	15:40	13:40	Medium	Belgian Grand Prix
8	S	Stavelot, Belgium	Circuit de Spa-Francorchamps	29 August	10:35	08:35	Medium	Belgian Grand Prix
9	F	Monza, Italy	Autodromo Nazionale Monza	11 September	15:40	13:40	Hard	Italian Grand Prix
9	S	Monza, Italy	Autodromo Nazionale Monza	12 September	10:35	08:35	Hard	Italian Grand Prix
10	F	(United Arab Emirates) Yas Island, Abu Dhabi	Yas Marina Circuit	13 November	11:00	07:00	Medium	Abu Dhabi Grand Prix
10	S	(United Arab Emirates) Yas Island, Abu Dhabi	Yas Marina Circuit	14 November	13:30	09:30	Medium	Abu Dhabi Grand Prix

The following rounds were included on the provisional calendars published by the FIA but were cancelled:

Round	Location	Circuit	Date	Supporting
F	Portimão, Portugal	Autódromo Internacional do Algarve	19 June	GP3 Series
S	Portimão, Portugal	Autódromo Internacional do Algarve	20 June	GP3 Series

== Results ==
Round		Circuit	Pole position	Fastest lap	Winning driver	Winning team	Report
1	F	(Spain) Circuit de Catalunya	(France) Jules Bianchi	(United Kingdom) Sam Bird	(France) Charles Pic	(United Kingdom) Arden International	Report
1	S	(Spain) Circuit de Catalunya		(Switzerland) Fabio Leimer	(Switzerland) Fabio Leimer	(Portugal) Ocean Racing Technology	Report
2	F	Circuit de Monaco	(Spain) Dani Clos	(Mexico) Sergio Pérez (Note: Pérez and Pastor Maldonado set the identical fastest laps (1:21.823), but Pérez made it earlier than Maldonado, so he was eligible to score point for the fastest lap.)	(Mexico) Sergio Pérez	(Spain) Barwa Addax Team	Report
2	S	Circuit de Monaco		(United Kingdom) Sam Bird	(Belgium) Jérôme d'Ambrosio	(France) DAMS	Report
3	F	(Turkey) Istanbul Park	(Italy) Davide Valsecchi	(Venezuela) Pastor Maldonado (Note: Maldonado and Davide Valsecchi set the identical fastest laps (1:37.010), but Maldonado made it earlier than Valsecchi, so he was eligible to score point for the fastest lap.)	(Venezuela) Pastor Maldonado	(Italy) Rapax	Report
3	S	(Turkey) Istanbul Park		(United Kingdom) Oliver Turvey (Note: Oliver Turvey set the fastest lap, but did not finish in the top 10, so was ineligible to be the point-scorer for the fastest lap. Dani Clos was the point-scorer instead for setting the fastest lap of those finishing in the top 10.)	(Spain) Dani Clos	(Spain) Racing Engineering	Report
4	F	(Spain) Valencia Street Circuit	(Mexico) Sergio Pérez	(Venezuela) Pastor Maldonado	(Venezuela) Pastor Maldonado	(Italy) Rapax	Report
4	S	(Spain) Valencia Street Circuit		(Mexico) Sergio Pérez (Note: Sergio Pérez set the fastest lap, but did not finish in the top 10, so was ineligible to be the point-scorer for the fastest lap. Pastor Maldonado was the point-scorer instead for setting the fastest lap of those finishing in the top 10.)	(Sweden) Marcus Ericsson	(United Kingdom) Super Nova Racing	Report
5	F	(United Kingdom) Silverstone Circuit	(France) Jules Bianchi	(Venezuela) Pastor Maldonado	(Venezuela) Pastor Maldonado	(Italy) Rapax	Report
5	S	(United Kingdom) Silverstone Circuit		(Mexico) Sergio Pérez	(Mexico) Sergio Pérez	(Spain) Barwa Addax Team	Report
6	F	(Germany) Hockenheimring	(France) Charles Pic	(France) Jules Bianchi	(Venezuela) Pastor Maldonado	(Italy) Rapax	Report
6	S	(Germany) Hockenheimring		(Mexico) Sergio Pérez	(Mexico) Sergio Pérez	(Spain) Barwa Addax Team	Report
7	F	(Hungary) Hungaroring	(United Kingdom) Sam Bird (Note: Sam Bird set the fastest time in qualifying, but started the race from the pit lane after stalling on the second formation lap. Pole position was left vacant on the grid. As second-placed man Davide Valsecchi also stalled, Oliver Turvey, in the third slot, was the first driver on the grid. Bird is still considered to have held pole position.)	(Venezuela) Pastor Maldonado	(Venezuela) Pastor Maldonado	(Italy) Rapax	Report
7	S	(Hungary) Hungaroring		(Romania) Michael Herck (Note: Michael Herck set the fastest lap, but did not finish in the top 10, so was ineligible to be the point-scorer for the fastest lap. Giacomo Ricci was the point-scorer instead for setting the fastest lap of those finishing in the top 10.)	(Italy) Giacomo Ricci	(United Kingdom) DPR	Report
8	F	(Belgium) Circuit de Spa-Francorchamps	(Belgium) Jérôme d'Ambrosio (Note: Michael Herck recorded the fastest time in qualifying, but he and seven other drivers received three-place grid penalties for ignoring yellow flags. Jérôme d'Ambrosio was recognised as the pole-sitter for the race.)	(Italy) Davide Valsecchi (Note: Davide Valsecchi set the fastest lap, but did not finish in the top 10, so was ineligible to be the point-scorer for the fastest lap. Álvaro Parente was the point-scorer instead for setting the fastest lap of those finishing in the top 10.)	(Venezuela) Pastor Maldonado	(Italy) Rapax	Report
8	S	(Belgium) Circuit de Spa-Francorchamps		(Mexico) Sergio Pérez	(Mexico) Sergio Pérez	(Spain) Barwa Addax Team	Report
9	F	(Italy) Autodromo Nazionale Monza	(France) Jules Bianchi	(United Kingdom) Sam Bird	(United Kingdom) Sam Bird	(France) ART Grand Prix	Report
9	S	(Italy) Autodromo Nazionale Monza		(United Kingdom) Sam Bird	(Germany) Christian Vietoris	(Spain) Racing Engineering	Report
10	F	(United Arab Emirates) Yas Marina Circuit	(United Kingdom) Oliver Turvey	(Mexico) Sergio Pérez	(Mexico) Sergio Pérez	(Spain) Barwa Addax Team	Report
10	S	(United Arab Emirates) Yas Marina Circuit		(Netherlands) Giedo van der Garde (Note: Giedo van der Garde set the fastest lap, but did not finish in the top 10, so was ineligible to be the point-scorer for the fastest lap. Luiz Razia was the point-scorer instead for setting the fastest lap of those finishing in the top 10.)	(Italy) Davide Valsecchi	(United Kingdom) iSport International	Report

== Championship standings ==
Scoring system

Points are awarded to the top 8 classified finishers in the Feature race, and to the top 6 classified finishers in the Sprint race. The pole-sitter in the feature race will also receive two points, and one point is given to the driver who set the fastest lap inside the top ten in both the feature and sprint races. No extra points are awarded to the pole-sitter in the sprint race.

Feature race points

Position	**1st**	**2nd**	**3rd**	**4th**	**5th**	**6th**	**7th**	**8th**	**Pole**	**FL**
Points	10	8	6	5	4	3	2	1	2	1

Sprint race points

Points are awarded to the top 6 classified finishers.

Position	**1st**	**2nd**	**3rd**	**4th**	**5th**	**6th**	**FL**
Points	6	5	4	3	2	1	1

=== Drivers' Championship ===
Pos	Driver	CAT (Spain)		MON (Monaco)		IST (Turkey)		VAL (Spain)		SIL (United Kingdom)		HOC (Germany)		HUN (Hungary)		SPA (Belgium)		MNZ (Italy)		YMC (United Arab Emirates)		Points
1	(Venezuela) Pastor Maldonado	6	3	2	11	1	6	1	4	1	4	1	20†	1	DSQ	1	Ret	Ret	Ret	17	8	87
2	(Mexico) Sergio Pérez	4	Ret	1	6	DSQ	7	**11**	16	5	1	2	1	3	Ret	7	1	Ret	13	1	Ret	71
3	(France) Jules Bianchi	**Ret**	12	4	3	Ret	13	2	Ret	**2**	5	5	4	Ret	DNS	14	Ret	**2**	4	18	17	52
4	(Spain) Dani Clos	3	6	**3**	Ret	8	1	5	7	3	3	4	6	16	7	Ret	DNS	Ret	12	4	4	51
5	(United Kingdom) Sam Bird	9	4	18	10	3	10	3	10	4	DNS	14	5	**13**	Ret	Ret	12	1	3	3	Ret	48
6	(United Kingdom) Oliver Turvey	5	5	15	15	14	18	Ret	12	8	2	8	2	4	5	6	5	3	6	**2**	16	47
7	(Netherlands) Giedo van der Garde	20	9	6	2	4	3	4	2	9	7	12	9	5	4	9	2	Ret	Ret	Ret	19	39
8	(Italy) Davide Valsecchi	10	11	Ret	16	**2**	4	10	6	7	6	17	18	9	3	18	8	9	16	5	1	31
9	(Germany) Christian Vietoris	Ret	18	14	DNS	7	Ret	12	Ret	6	10	Ret	10	2	2	11	Ret	4	1			29
10	(France) Charles Pic	1	7	11	7	Ret	DNS	6	5	10	8	**3**	17	11	9	4	Ret	11	8	20	10	28
11	(Brazil) Luiz Razia	7	2	7	5	5	2	Ret	Ret	Ret	15	Ret	13	10	Ret	16	10	Ret	10	7	2	28
12	(Belgium) Jérôme d'Ambrosio	Ret	13	8	1	10	8	Ret	8	11	11			6	Ret	**Ret**	Ret	5	2	14	7	21
13	(Italy) Giacomo Ricci	2	8	17	Ret	Ret	17	Ret	Ret	13	12	16†	11	8	1							16
14	(France) Romain Grosjean											20	19†			3	6	13	17†	6	3	14
15	(Portugal) Álvaro Parente															2	3	12	9			13
16	(Romania) Michael Herck	17	21	16	Ret	6	5	8	3	22	14	9	8	7	Ret	Ret	13	Ret	Ret	16	9	12
17	(Sweden) Marcus Ericsson	11	Ret	12	9	Ret	Ret	7	1	12	18	6	Ret	12	10	13	7	Ret	11	11	Ret	11
18	(South Africa) Adrian Zaugg	16	15	Ret	12	Ret	Ret	14	15	15	21	7	3	15	8	15	9	6	7	Ret	DNS	9
19	(Switzerland) Fabio Leimer	8	1	Ret	17	13	15	Ret	Ret	17	13	21†	Ret	Ret	11	12	Ret	Ret	DNS	Ret	14	8
20	(Italy) Luca Filippi									20	9	10	7	14	6	5	Ret	Ret	14			5
21	(Venezuela) Rodolfo González	15	14	10	Ret	16	16	Ret	Ret	16	20	18	Ret	Ret	15	8	4	Ret	Ret	10	15	4
22	(Brazil) Alberto Valerio	14	Ret	5	Ret	17†	19	9	Ret	14	22	11	12	Ret	12							4
23	(Venezuela) Johnny Cecotto Jr.	Ret	17	9	4	12	12	Ret	14	18	23	13	Ret	Ret	13	10	Ret					3
24	(Czech Republic) Josef Král	12	19	13	8	15	14	Ret	Ret											8	5	3
25	(United Kingdom) Max Chilton	18	16	Ret	14	9	11	Ret	11	19	19	19	16	17	16	17	11	8	5	12	11	3
26	(Italy) Edoardo Piscopo																	7	Ret			2
27	(New Zealand) Brendon Hartley																	Ret	Ret	9	6	1
28	(China) Ho-Pin Tung	13	10	Ret	Ret	11	9	Ret	13	Ret	15	Ret	14	Ret	DNS					Ret	12	0
29	(Bulgaria) Vladimir Arabadzhiev	19	20	Ret	13	Ret	Ret	13†	9	21	17	15	15	18	14	19	Ret					0
30	(Italy) Fabrizio Crestani															Ret	14	10	15	13	13	0
31	(United Kingdom) James Jakes																			15	18	0
32	(Italy) Federico Leo																			19	Ret	0
Pos	Driver	CAT (Spain)		MON (Monaco)		IST (Turkey)		VAL (Spain)		SIL (United Kingdom)		HOC (Germany)		HUN (Hungary)		SPA (Belgium)		MNZ (Italy)		YMC (United Arab Emirates)		Points

Key
Colour	Result
Gold	Winner
Silver	2nd place
Bronze	3rd place
Green	Other points position
Blue	Other classified position
Blue	Not classified, finished (NC)
Purple	Not classified, retired (Ret)
Red	Did not qualify (DNQ)
Red	Did not pre-qualify (DNPQ)
Black	Disqualified (DSQ)
White	Did not start (DNS)
White	Race cancelled (C)
Blank	Did not practice (DNP)
Blank	Excluded (EX)
Blank	Did not arrive (DNA)
Blank	Withdrawn (WD)
Text formatting	Meaning
**Bold**	Pole position point(s)
Italics	Fastest lap point(s)

Notes:

- † — Drivers did not finish the race, but were classified as they completed over 90% of the race distance.

=== Teams' Championship ===
Pos	Team	Car No.	CAT (Spain)		MON (Monaco)		IST (Turkey)		VAL (Spain)		SIL (United Kingdom)		HOC (Germany)		HUN (Hungary)		SPA (Belgium)		MNZ (Italy)		YMC (United Arab Emirates)		Points
1	(Italy) Rapax	14	7	2	7	5	5	2	Ret	Ret	Ret	15	Ret	13	10	Ret	16	10	Ret	10	7	2	115
1	(Italy) Rapax	15	6	3	2	11	1	6	1	4	1	4	1	20†	1	DSQ	1	Ret	Ret	Ret	17	8	115
2	(Spain) Barwa Addax Team	3	20	9	6	2	4	3	4	2	9	7	12	9	5	4	9	2	Ret	Ret	Ret	19	110
2	(Spain) Barwa Addax Team	4	4	Ret	1	6	DSQ	7	**11**	16	5	1	2	1	3	Ret	7	1	Ret	13	1	Ret	110
3	(France) ART Grand Prix	1	**Ret**	12	4	3	Ret	13	2	Ret	**2**	5	5	4	Ret	DNS	14	Ret	**2**	4	18	17	100
3	(France) ART Grand Prix	2	9	4	18	10	3	10	3	10	4	DNS	14	5	**13**	Ret	Ret	12	1	3	3	Ret	100
4	(Spain) Racing Engineering	7	3	6	**3**	Ret	8	1	5	7	3	3	4	6	16	7	Ret	DNS	Ret	12	4	4	80
4	(Spain) Racing Engineering	8	Ret	18	14	DNS	7	Ret	12	Ret	6	10	Ret	10	2	2	11	Ret	4	1	Ret	12	80
5	(United Kingdom) iSport International	9	5	5	15	15	14	18	Ret	12	8	2	8	2	4	5	6	5	3	6	**2**	16	78
5	(United Kingdom) iSport International	10	10	11	Ret	16	**2**	4	10	6	7	6	17	18	9	3	18	8	9	16	5	1	78
6	(France) DAMS	11	Ret	13	8	1	10	8	Ret	8	11	11	20	19†	6	Ret	**Ret**	Ret	5	2	14	7	35
6	(France) DAMS	12	13	10	Ret	Ret	11	9	Ret	13	Ret	15	Ret	14	Ret	DNS	3	6	13	17†	6	3	35
7	(United Kingdom) Arden International	16	1	7	11	7	Ret	DNS	6	5	10	8	**3**	17	11	9	4	Ret	11	8	20	10	32
7	(United Kingdom) Arden International	17	15	14	10	Ret	16	16	Ret	Ret	16	20	18	Ret	Ret	15	8	4	Ret	Ret	10	15	32
8	(United Kingdom) DPR	26	17	21	16	Ret	6	5	8	3	22	14	9	8	7	Ret	Ret	13	Ret	Ret	16	9	28
8	(United Kingdom) DPR	27	2	8	17	Ret	Ret	17	Ret	Ret	13	12	16†	11	8	1	Ret	14	10	15	13	13	28
9	(United Kingdom) Super Nova Racing	5	12	19	13	8	15	14	Ret	Ret	20	9	10	7	14	6	5	Ret	Ret	14	8	5	19
9	(United Kingdom) Super Nova Racing	6	11	Ret	12	9	Ret	Ret	7	1	12	18	6	Ret	12	10	13	7	Ret	11	11	Ret	19
10	(Italy) Scuderia Coloni	20	14	Ret	5	Ret	17†	19	9	Ret	14	22	11	12	Ret	12	2	3	12	9	15	18	18
10	(Italy) Scuderia Coloni	21	19	20	Ret	13	Ret	Ret	13†	9	21	17	15	15	18	14	19	Ret	Ret	Ret	9	6	18
11	(Italy) Trident Racing	24	Ret	17	9	4	12	12	Ret	14	18	23	13	Ret	Ret	13	10	Ret	7	Ret	19	Ret	14
11	(Italy) Trident Racing	25	16	15	Ret	12	Ret	Ret	14	15	15	21	7	3	15	8	15	9	6	7	Ret	DNS	14
12	(Portugal) Ocean Racing Technology	18	18	16	Ret	14	9	11	Ret	11	19	19	19	16	17	16	17	11	8	5	12	11	11
12	(Portugal) Ocean Racing Technology	19	8	1	Ret	17	13	15	Ret	Ret	17	13	21†	Ret	Ret	11	12	Ret	Ret	DNS	Ret	14	11
Pos	Team	Car No.	CAT (Spain)		MON (Monaco)		IST (Turkey)		VAL (Spain)		SIL (United Kingdom)		HOC (Germany)		HUN (Hungary)		SPA (Belgium)		MNZ (Italy)		YMC (United Arab Emirates)		Points

Key
Colour	Result
Gold	Winner
Silver	2nd place
Bronze	3rd place
Green	Other points position
Blue	Other classified position
Blue	Not classified, finished (NC)
Purple	Not classified, retired (Ret)
Red	Did not qualify (DNQ)
Red	Did not pre-qualify (DNPQ)
Black	Disqualified (DSQ)
White	Did not start (DNS)
White	Race cancelled (C)
Blank	Did not practice (DNP)
Blank	Excluded (EX)
Blank	Did not arrive (DNA)
Blank	Withdrawn (WD)
Text formatting	Meaning
**Bold**	Pole position point(s)
Italics	Fastest lap point(s)

Notes:

- † — Drivers did not finish the race, but were classified as they completed over 90% of the race distance.
