= 2009 Yas Marina GP2 Asia Series round =

Car racing competition

(United Arab Emirates) 2009 Abu Dhabi GP2 round
Round details
- Round 1 of 4 rounds in the 2009 GP2 Series
- Yas Marina Circuit
- Location: Yas Marina Circuit, Abu Dhabi, United Arab Emirates
- Course: Permanent racing facility 5.554 km (3.451 mi)

GP2 Series

Feature race
- Date: 31 October 2009
- Laps: 33

Pole position
Driver	(Italy) Davide Valsecchi	iSport International
- Time: 1:51.964

Podium
First	(Italy) Davide Valsecchi	iSport International
Second	(Italy) Luca Filippi	MalaysiaQi-Meritus.com
Third	(United Kingdom) James Jakes	Super Nova Racing

Fastest lap
Driver	(Italy) Davide Valsecchi	iSport International
- Time: 1:53.341 (on lap 32)

Sprint race
- Date: 1 November 2009
- Laps: 22

Podium
First	(Germany) Christian Vietoris	DAMS
Second	(Italy) Davide Valsecchi	iSport International
Third	(Czech Republic) Josef Král	Super Nova Racing

Fastest lap
Driver	(United Kingdom) Sam Bird (Note: Sam Bird set the fastest lap, but did not finish in the top 10, so was ineligible to be the point-scorer for the fastest lap. Davide Valsecchi was the point-scorer instead for setting the fastest lap of those finishing in the top 10.)	ART Grand Prix
- Time: 1:52.070 (on lap 22)

The 2009–10 Abu Dhabi 1st GP2 Asia round was the first round of the 2009–10 GP2 Asia Series season. It was held on October 31 and November 1, 2009 at Yas Marina Circuit in Abu Dhabi, United Arab Emirates. The race was used as a support race to the day/night 2009 Abu Dhabi Grand Prix. It was the first of two rounds to be held at the circuit, the other will be the 2009–10 Abu Dhabi 2nd GP2 Asia round. The round was the only one held in 2009, the rest being held in 2010.

== Report ==
=== Feature race ===
The first race looked like it was dominated by Davide Valsecchi, who took pole, won race and got fastest lap, but he lost the lead at the start when Valsecchi was beaten off the line by GP2 debutant Sam Bird, Valsecchi managed to re-pass him going down the long back straight to turn 8. Bird was also passed by GP2 Asia returnee James Jakes and GP2 veteran Luca Filippi. Filippi found enough pace to not only pass Jakes for second, but also jump ahead of Valsecchi after the mandatory pit stops. A crash between Luiz Razia and Christian Vietoris made the safety car appear and this allowed Valsecchi to close the gap between himself and Filippi. Valsecchi put pressure on Filippi later in the race and finally won the lead battle by muscling through after a very close side by side dice through the Turn 11, 12, 13 and 14 complex. He briefly came under threat when Trident driver Plamen Kralev's spin prompted the safety car again, but had the pace to pull away and secure the win. Filippi managed to fend off Jakes to retain second place, with Alexander Rossi the top rookie in fourth place, followed by fellow newcomers Josef Král and Vietoris. Rossi and Král's former International Formula Master rival Fabio Leimer was unable to capitalise on his excellent third on the grid as his Ocean Racing Technology car stalled before the formation lap. Fifth place qualifier Roldán Rodríguez left another gap when he failed to get off the line at the start. Bird had been on course for fourth until he retired on the penultimate lap with brake problems, which meant his countryman and fellow GP2 debutant Oliver Turvey moved up to eighth in the second iSport car and would therefore start from reverse grid pole for the sprint race, alongside Johnny Cecotto Jr. of Trident Racing.

=== Sprint race ===
For the sprint race, Turvey started on pole, having finished eighth in the feature race. He got off the line slowly and DAMS driver Vietoris burst through from third to the lead at the start, Turvey falling back to fourth behind Král and Rossi into the first corner. Turvey's front row partner Cecotto, Jr. also fell down the order, to seventh behind the feature race top duo Filippi and Valsecchi. Valsecchi was a man determined to get big points, and after a few side by side tussles, managed to pass Filippi. With the momentum, Valsecchi also managed to pass his team-mate Turvey after Filippi had spun trying to avoid Cecotto. The safety car then gave Valsecchi a chance to catch up with the top three, the yellow being required after Will Bratt's Coloni machine had snapped into a high-speed spin at the end of the back straight and collected Leimer on its way to the barrier. Vietoris and Král had pulled comfortably clear of the field before the safety car, with the DAMS driver edging away early on before Král closed back onto his tail at half-distance. But the safety car cost them their cushion, for Valsecchi swiftly muscled past Rossi for third after the restart and then rapidly closed on Vietoris and Král. That gave Vietoris some breathing space, as Valsecchi climbed all over the back of Král before diving ahead into Turn 11 on the last lap. There was no time left to catch Vietoris though, and the German duly ended his first GP2 weekend with victory. Turvey put a late move on Rossi to take fourth, with Cecotto hanging on to sixth ahead of Vietoris' team-mate Edoardo Piscopo and the delayed Filippi. Jakes was forced wide at the first corner and could only finish 10th, the Super Nova driver having spent most of the race trying in vain to pass DPR's Michael Herck.

== Classification ==
=== Qualifying ===
Pos	No	Driver	Team	Time	Gap	Grid
1	17	(Italy) Davide Valsecchi	iSport International	1:51.964		1
2	8	(United Kingdom) Sam Bird	ART Grand Prix	1:52.183	+0.219	2
3	23	(Switzerland) Fabio Leimer	Ocean Racing Technology	1:52.236	+0.272	3
4	20	(Italy) Luca Filippi	MalaysiaQi-Meritus.com	1:52.240	+0.276	4
5	24	(Spain) Roldán Rodríguez	Scuderia Coloni	1:52.300	+0.336	5
6	12	(Venezuela) Rodolfo González	Arden International	1:52.436	+0.472	6
7	14	(United Kingdom) James Jakes	Super Nova Racing	1:52.529	+0.565	7
8	18	(Venezuela) Johnny Cecotto Jr.	Trident Racing	1:52.557	+0.593	8
9	15	(Czech Republic) Josef Král	Super Nova Racing	1:52.575	+0.611	9
10	27	(Italy) Giacomo Ricci	DPR	1:52.690	+0.726	10
11	2	(Italy) Edoardo Piscopo	DAMS	1:52.792	+0.828	11
12	4	(Italy) Daniel Zampieri	Piquet GP	1:52.816	+0.852	12
13	22	(United States) Alexander Rossi	Ocean Racing Technology	1:52.827	+0.863	13
14	1	(Germany) Christian Vietoris	DAMS	1:52.830	+0.866	14
15	7	(Sweden) Marcus Ericsson	ART Grand Prix	1:52.846	+0.882	15
16	26	(Romania) Michael Herck	DPR	1:52.869	+0.905	16
17	21	(Brazil) Diego Nunes	MalaysiaQi-Meritus.com	1:52.907	+0.943	17
18	16	(United Kingdom) Oliver Turvey	iSport International	1:52.955	+0.991	18
19	6	(Brazil) Luiz Razia	Barwa Addax Team	1:52.996	+1.032	19
20	11	(France) Charles Pic	Arden International	1:53.112	+1.148	20
21	5	(United Kingdom) Max Chilton	Barwa Addax Team	1:53.147	+1.183	21
22	3	(Bulgaria) Vladimir Arabadzhiev	Piquet GP	1:53.628	+1.664	22
23	25	(United Kingdom) Will Bratt	Scuderia Coloni	1:53.711	+1.747	23
24	19	(Bulgaria) Plamen Kralev	Trident Racing	1:58.149	+6.185	24

=== Feature race ===
Pos	No	Driver	Team	Laps	Time/Retired	Grid	Points
1	17	(Italy) Davide Valsecchi	iSport International	33	1:07:49.810	1	10+2+1
2	20	(Italy) Luca Filippi	MalaysiaQi-Meritus.com	33	+4.881	4	8
3	14	(United Kingdom) James Jakes	Super Nova Racing	33	+6.174	7	6
4	22	(United States) Alexander Rossi	Ocean Racing Technology	33	+7.182	13	5
5	15	(Czech Republic) Josef Král	Super Nova Racing	33	+8.220	9	4
6	1	(Germany) Christian Vietoris	DAMS	33	+13.300	14	3
7	18	(Venezuela) Johnny Cecotto Jr.	Trident Racing	33	+15.460	8	2
8	16	(United Kingdom) Oliver Turvey	iSport International	33	+16.223	18	1
9	2	(Italy) Edoardo Piscopo	DAMS	33	+16.715	11	
10	24	(Spain) Roldán Rodríguez	Scuderia Coloni	33	+16.879	5	
11	7	(Sweden) Marcus Ericsson	ART Grand Prix	33	+21.686	15	
12	25	(United Kingdom) Will Bratt	Scuderia Coloni	33	+22.539	23	
13	26	(Romania) Michael Herck	DPR	33	+22.881	16	
14	12	(Venezuela) Rodolfo González	Arden International	33	+23.403	6	
15	4	(Italy) Daniel Zampieri	Piquet GP	33	+23.786	12	
16	5	(United Kingdom) Max Chilton	Barwa Addax Team	33	+25.131	21	
17	23	(Switzerland) Fabio Leimer	Ocean Racing Technology	33	+30.019	3	
18	8	(United Kingdom) Sam Bird	ART Grand Prix	31	+2 laps	2	
Ret	11	(France) Charles Pic	Arden International	28	DNF	20	
Ret	3	(Bulgaria) Vladimir Arabadzhiev	Piquet GP	25	DNF	22	
Ret	19	(Bulgaria) Plamen Kralev	Trident Racing	24	DNF	24	
Ret	6	(Brazil) Luiz Razia	Barwa Addax Team	12	DNF	19	
Ret	27	(Italy) Giacomo Ricci	DPR	8	DNF	10	
Ret	21	(Brazil) Diego Nunes	MalaysiaQi-Meritus.com	0	DNF	17	
Fastest lap: Davide Valsecchi (iSport International) 1:53.341 (lap 32)

=== Sprint race ===
Pos	No	Driver	Team	Laps	Time/Retired	Grid	Points
1	1	(Germany) Christian Vietoris	DAMS	22	43:18.814	3	6
2	17	(Italy) Davide Valsecchi	iSport International	22	+2.447	8	5+1
3	15	(Czech Republic) Josef Král	Super Nova Racing	22	+3.195	4	4
4	16	(United Kingdom) Oliver Turvey	iSport International	22	+6.616	1	3
5	22	(United States) Alexander Rossi	Ocean Racing Technology	22	+7.240	5	2
6	18	(Venezuela) Johnny Cecotto Jr.	Trident Racing	22	+7.711	2	1
7	2	(Italy) Edoardo Piscopo	DAMS	22	+8.237	9	
8	20	(Italy) Luca Filippi	MalaysiaQi-Meritus.com	22	+10.136	7	
9	26	(Romania) Michael Herck	DPR	22	+10.730	13	
10	14	(United Kingdom) James Jakes	Super Nova Racing	22	+11.643	6	
11	6	(Brazil) Luiz Razia	Barwa Addax Team	22	+11.881	22	
12	7	(Sweden) Marcus Ericsson	ART Grand Prix	22	+12.315	11	
13	21	(Brazil) Diego Nunes	MalaysiaQi-Meritus.com	22	+12.893	25	
14	24	(Spain) Roldán Rodríguez	Scuderia Coloni	22	+13.303	10	
15	11	(France) Charles Pic	Arden International	22	+13.777	19	
16	12	(Venezuela) Rodolfo González	Arden International	22	+14.431	14	
17	5	(United Kingdom) Max Chilton	Barwa Addax Team	22	+19.485	16	
18	8	(United Kingdom) Sam Bird	ART Grand Prix	22	+21.421	18	
Ret	3	(Bulgaria) Vladimir Arabadzhiev	Piquet GP	17	DNF	20	
Ret	23	(Switzerland) Fabio Leimer	Ocean Racing Technology	14	DNF	17	
Ret	25	(United Kingdom) Will Bratt	Scuderia Coloni	14	DNF	12	
Ret	4	(Italy) Daniel Zampieri	Piquet GP	5	DNF	15	
Ret	27	(Italy) Giacomo Ricci	DPR	1	DNF	24	
Ret	19	(Bulgaria) Plamen Kralev	Trident Racing	0	DNF	21	
Fastest lap: Sam Bird (ART Grand Prix) 1:52.070 (lap 22)

== Standings after the race ==
Drivers' Championship standings

Pos	Driver	Points
1	(Italy) Davide Valsecchi	19
2	(Germany) Christian Vietoris	9
3	(Italy) Luca Filippi	8
4	(Czech Republic) Josef Král	8
5	(United States) Alexander Rossi	7

Teams' Championship standings

Pos	Team	Points
1	(United Kingdom) iSport International	23
2	(United Kingdom) Super Nova Racing	14
3	(France) DAMS	9
4	(Malaysia) MalaysiaQi-Meritus.com	8
5	(Portugal) Ocean Racing Technology	7

- Note: Only the top five positions are included for both sets of standings.

== Notes ==
Previous round: 2009 Bahrain 2nd GP2 Asia Series round	GP2 Asia Series Championship; 2009–10 season	Next round: 2009–10 Abu Dhabi 2nd GP2 Asia round
Previous round: none	Abu Dhabi GP2 Asia round	Next round: 2009–10 Abu Dhabi 2nd GP2 Asia round
