= Michael Herck =

Romanian-Belgian racing driver

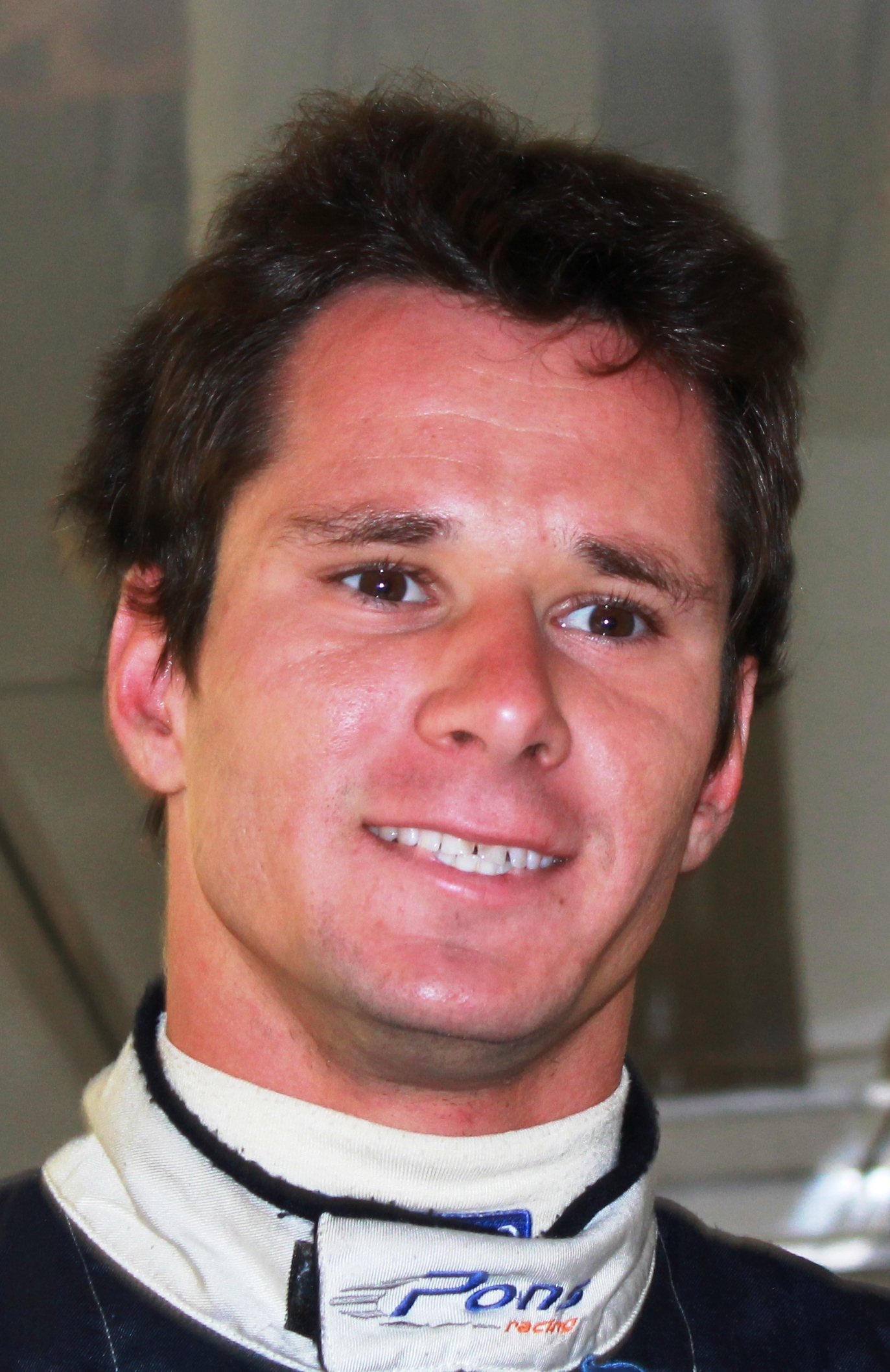
- Michael Herck at the 2011 Nürburgring World series by Renault round
- Nationality: (Romania) Romanian (Belgium) Belgian via dual nationality
- Born: 4 August 1988 (age 38) Bucharest, Romania

Previous series
- 2008–2011 2008–2011 2007, 2009 2006–07 2005 2005 2005 2005 2004 2004 2004 2003: GP2 Series; GP2 Asia Series; Formula Renault 3.5 Series; Formula 3 Euro Series; Austrian Formula Three; British Formula 3 German Formula Three; Formula Renault 2.0 Italia; FR1600 Belgium; Formula Junior 1600 Spain; Formula Renault Monza; FRenault Monza W. Series

Championship titles
- 2005 2004 2004: Austrian F3; Formula Junior 1600 Spain; Formula Renault Monza

Michael Herck (born 4 August 1988 in Bucharest, Romania) is a Romanian-Belgian retired racing driver.

== Career ==
=== Early life ===
Herck was adopted at the age of one and a half years by millionaire André Herck, a Belgian citizen born in Bucharest. Herck grew up in Monaco, and began his racing career in karting in France where he won the French national title in the Minime category in 2000.

=== Formula Renault ===
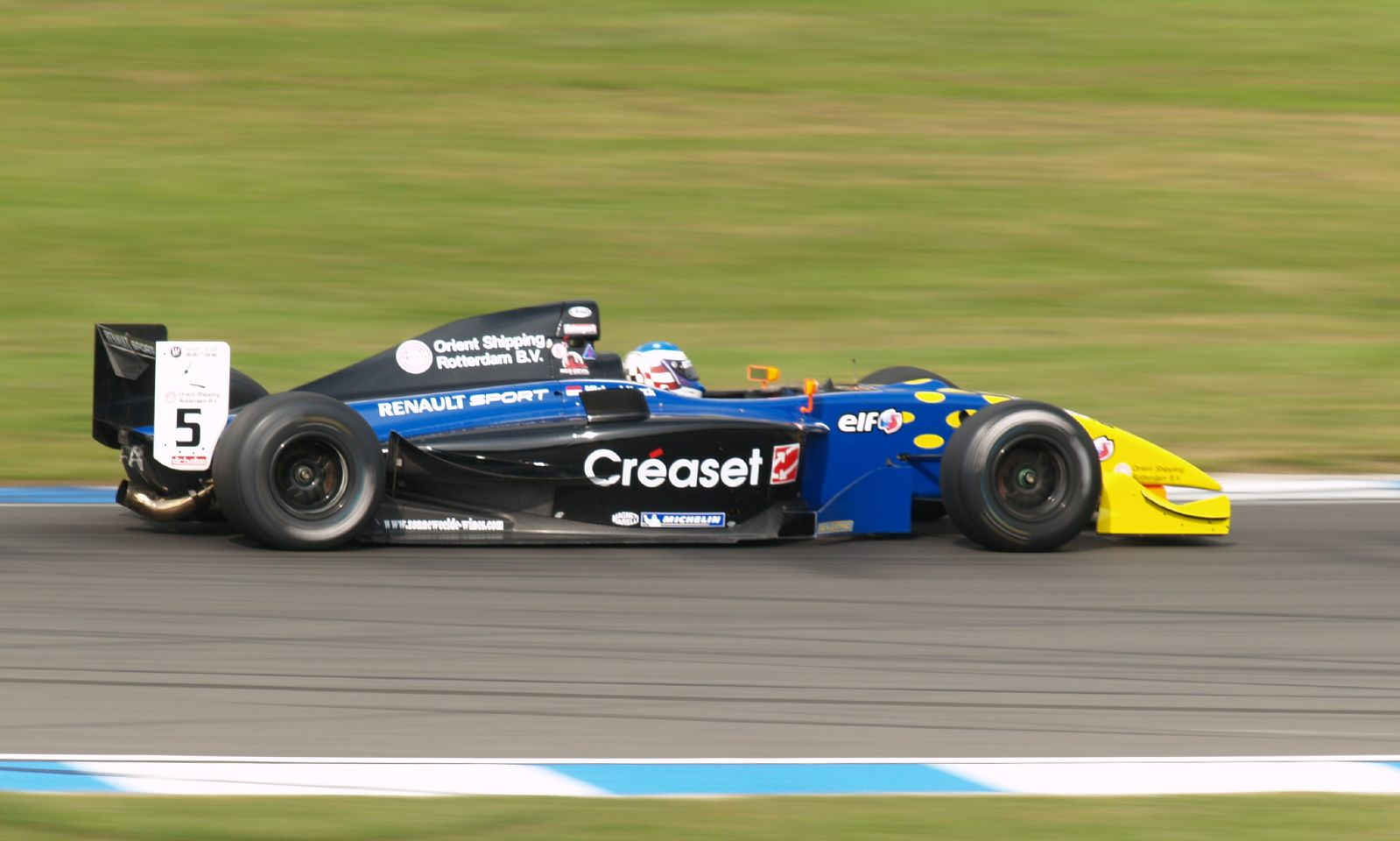
Herck driving for Comtec Racing at the Donington Park round of the 2007 Formula Renault 3.5 Series season.

After karting, Herck moved to the Formula Renault Monza Winter Series in 2003 and competed in the full series the next year. He won the 2004 championship with five wins and 375 points. He also competed in the Belgian and Spanish 1.6-litre series in 2004, winning the latter championship.

In 2007, Herck drove in the Formula Renault 3.5 Series for the Comtec Racing team, but failed to score any points.

=== Formula Three ===
Herck moved to Formula Three for 2005, winning the Austrian championship. He also made selected appearances in that year's British and German championships. In 2006, he competed in the Formula 3 Euro Series with backing from compatriot Bas Leinders, scoring twelve points to finish fifteenth in the championship.

=== GP2 Series ===
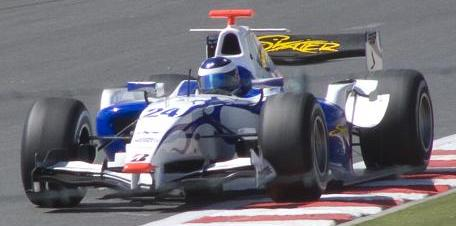
Herck driving for David Price Racing at the Magny-Cours round of the 2008 GP2 Series season.

Herck competed in the first eight races of the inaugural GP2 Asia Series in 2008 for the FMS International team before breaking his wrist in an accident, missing the last round of the season.

Herck was scheduled to drive in the main GP2 Series for 2008 as well, but was initially replaced by Giacomo Ricci in the David Price Racing team until his wrist healed. After two rounds of the championship, Ricci was dropped in favour of Andy Soucek as Herck continued to recover. He finally made his GP2 début at Magny-Cours. He continued with DPR for the 2008–09 GP2 Asia Series season, and also the 2009 GP2 Series season. At the Autódromo Internacional do Algarve, Herck finished sixth on the road during the feature race. However, his first GP2 points were stripped from him due to irregularities with his DPR machine. His first points eventually came during the 2009–10 GP2 Asia Series, finishing seventh in the feature race of the second Abu Dhabi round. After overtaking Max Chilton at the start of the sprint race, Herck was heading to his first podium and victory in the series, but Davide Valsecchi passed him just before the race's conclusion. Herck ultimately finished thirteenth in the championship standings.

Herck continued his improved form in the 2010 main series, finishing in the points on a number of occasions. He also qualified on pole position for his "home" race in Belgium, but lost it due to an infringement. He finished sixteenth in the drivers' championship.

Following the withdrawal of DPR from GP2, Herck switched to the Coloni team for 2011. In the Asia series, he was partnered variously by James Jakes and Luca Filippi, and finished eighth in the championship after scoring points in three of the four races. In the main series, he scored only a single point and finished 21st in the standings.

=== Retirement ===
Following a disappointing 2011 season in the main GP2 Series, Herck decided not to compete in the 2011 GP2 Final non-championship race in Abu Dhabi, and retired from professional motor racing in order to focus on his studies, as later confirmed by adoptive parent André Herck.

== Racing record ==
=== Career summary ===
Season	Series	Team	Races	Poles	Wins	Points	Position
2003	Formula Renault Monza Winter Series	Dynamic Engineering	2	0	0	18	8th
2004	Formula Renault Monza	Dynamic Engineering	16	3	5	375	**1st**
2004	Formula Junior 1600 Spain	?	9	6	4	119	**1st**
2004	Formula Renault 1600 Belgium	?	4	0	1	65	11th
2005	Austrian Formula Three Championship	Junior Racing Team	7	6	3	75	**1st**
2005	British Formula 3	Junior Racing Team	5	0	0	0	NC
2005	Formula Renault 2.0 Italia	Junior Racing Team	0	0	0	0	NC
2005	Recaro Formel 3 Cup	Jama Investments	3	1	0	0	NC
2006	Formula 3 Euro Series	Bas Leinders Junior Racing Team	19	0	0	12	15th
2006	British Formula 3	Bas Leinders Junior Racing Team	2	0	0	0	NC
2006	Masters of Formula Three	Bas Leinders Junior Racing Team	1	0	0	N/A	13th
2007	Formula Renault 3.5 Series	Comtec Racing	14	0	0	0	NC
2007	Formula 3 Euro Series	Bas Leinders Junior Racing Team	2	0	0	0	NC
2008	GP2 Asia Series	FMS International	8	0	0	0	23rd
2008	GP2 Series	DPR	13	0	0	0	30th
2008–09	GP2 Asia Series	David Price Racing	11	0	0	0	33rd
2009	GP2 Series	DPR	19	0	0	0	23rd
2009	Formula Renault 3.5 Series	Interwetten.com	6	0	0	7	23rd
2009–10	GP2 Asia Series	David Price Racing	8	0	0	7	13th
2010	GP2 Series	DPR	20	0	0	12	16th
2011	GP2 Asia Series	Scuderia Coloni	4	0	0	9	8th
2011	GP2 Series	Scuderia Coloni	18	0	0	1	21st

=== Complete Formula Renault 2.0 Italia results ===
(key) (Races in bold indicate pole position) (Races in italics indicate fastest lap)

Year	Team	1	2	3	4	5	6	7	8	9	10	11	12	13	14	15	16	17	Pos	Points
2005	Junior Racing Team	VLL; 1 DNQ	VLL; 2 DNQ	IMO; 1	IMO; 2	SPA; 1	SPA; 2	MNZ1; 1	MNZ1; 2	MNZ1; 3	MUG; 1	MUG; 2	MIS; 1	MIS; 2	MIS; 3	VAR	MNZ2; 1	MNZ2; 2	NC	0

=== Complete ATS Formel 3 Cup results ===
(key) (Races in bold indicate pole position) (Races in italics indicate fastest lap)

Year	Team	Chassis	Engine	1	2	3	4	5	6	7	8	9	10	11	12	13	14	15	16	17	18	Pos	Points
2005	Junior Racing Team	Dallara F305	Opel	OSC1; 1; 8	OSC1; 2; 6	HOC; 1	HOC; 2	SAC; 1	SAC; 2	LAU1; 1	LAU1; 2	NÜR1; 1; 23	**NÜR1**; **2** DNS	NÜR2; 1	NÜR2; 2	ASS; 1	ASS; 2	LAU2; 1	LAU2; 2	OSC2; 1	OSC2; 2	NC	0

=== Complete British Formula Three Championship results ===
(key) (Races in bold indicate pole position) (Races in italics indicate fastest lap)

Year	Team	Chassis	Engine	1	2	3	4	5	6	7	8	9	10	11	12	13	14	15	16	17	18	19	20	21	22	23	24	Pos	Points
2005	Junior Racing	Dallara F305	Opel	DON; 1	DON; 2	SPA; 1 C	SPA; 2 C	CRO; 1	CRO; 2	KNO; 1	KNO; 2	THR; 1	THR; 2	CAS; 1	CAS; 2	MNZ; 1	MNZ; 2	MNZ; 3	SIL; 1; 10	SIL; 2; 14	SIL; 3; 16	NÜR; 1; 13	NÜR; 2; 12	MON; 1	MON; 2	SIL; 1	SIL; 2	NC	0

=== Complete Formula 3 Euro Series results ===
(key) (Races in bold indicate pole position) (Races in italics indicate fastest lap)

Year	Team	Chassis	Engine	1	2	3	4	5	6	7	8	9	10	11	12	13	14	15	16	17	18	19	20	Pos	Points
2006	Bas Leinders Junior Racing Team	Dallara F306	Mercedes	HOC1; 1 Ret	HOC1; 2; 16	LAU; 1 Ret	LAU; 2; 14	OSC; 1 Ret	OSC; 2 DNS	BRH; 1; 7	BRH; 2; 2	NOR; 1 Ret	NOR; 2; 10	NÜR; 1; 6	NÜR; 2 Ret	ZAN; 1; 9	ZAN; 2; 23	CAT; 1; 12	CAT; 2 Ret	LMS; 1; 7	LMS; 2; 13	HOC2; 1; 11	HOC2; 2 Ret	15th	12
2007	Bas Leinders Junior Racing Team	Dallara F306	Mercedes	HOC1; 1; 14	HOC1; 2 Ret	BRH; 1	BRH; 2	NOR; 1	NOR; 2	MAG; 1	MAG; 2	MUG; 1	MUG; 2	ZAN; 1	ZAN; 2	NÜR; 1	NÜR; 2	CAT; 1	CAT; 2	NOG; 1	NOG; 2	HOC2; 1	HOC2; 2	24th	0

=== Complete Formula Renault 3.5 Series results ===
(key) (Races in bold indicate pole position) (Races in italics indicate fastest lap)

Year	Team	1	2	3	4	5	6	7	8	9	10	11	12	13	14	15	16	17	Pos	Points
2007	Red Devil Team Comtec	MNZ; 1	MNZ; 2	NÜR; 1; 21	NÜR; 2; 20	MON; 1 DNQ	HUN; 1 Ret	HUN; 2; 18	SPA; 1 Ret	SPA; 2; 12	DON; 1 Ret	DON; 2; 16	MAG; 1 Ret	MAG; 2 Ret	EST; 1; 16	EST; 2; 16	CAT; 1; 24	CAT; 2; 16	31st	0
2009	Interwetten.com Racing	CAT; 1	CAT; 2	SPA; 1	SPA; 2	MON; 1	HUN; 1 Ret	HUN; 2; 5	SIL; 1; 20	SIL; 2; 18	BUG; 1	BUG; 2	ALG; 1; 19	ALG; 2 Ret	NÜR; 1	NÜR; 2	ALC; 1	ALC; 2	23rd	7
2011	Pons Racing	ALC; 1	ALC; 2	SPA; 1	SPA; 2	MNZ; 1	MNZ; 2	MON; 1	NÜR; 1 Ret	NÜR; 2; 21	HUN; 1	HUN; 2	SIL; 1	SIL; 2	LEC; 1	LEC; 2	CAT; 1	CAT; 2	36th	0

=== Complete GP2 Series results ===
Year	Team	1	2	3	4	5	6	7	8	9	10	11	12	13	14	15	16	17	18	19	20	Pos	Points
2008	DPR	CAT; FEA	CAT; SPR	IST; FEA	IST; SPR	MON; FEA	MON; SPR	MAG; FEA; Ret	MAG; SPR; 15	SIL; FEA; 23	SIL; SPR; DNS	HOC; FEA; 17	HOC; SPR; Ret	HUN; FEA; Ret	HUN; SPR; 17	VAL; FEA; 12	VAL; SPR; 14	SPA; FEA; 14	SPA; SPR; 11	MNZ; FEA; Ret	MNZ; SPR; 17	30th	0
2009	DPR	CAT; FEA; 13	CAT; SPR; Ret	MON; FEA; 16	MON; SPR; 16	IST; FEA; Ret	IST; SPR; Ret	SIL; FEA; 9	SIL; SPR; 8	NÜR; FEA; 14	NÜR; SPR; 12	HUN; FEA; 15	HUN; SPR; DNS	VAL; FEA; 13	VAL; SPR; Ret	SPA; FEA; Ret	SPA; SPR; 9	MNZ; FEA; 20†	MNZ; SPR; 13	ALG; FEA; DSQ	ALG; SPR; Ret	23rd	0
2010	DPR	CAT; FEA; 17	CAT; SPR; 21	MON; FEA; 16	MON; SPR; Ret	IST; FEA; 6	IST; SPR; 5	VAL; FEA; 8	VAL; SPR; 3	SIL; FEA; 22	SIL; SPR; 14	HOC; FEA; 9	HOC; SPR; 8	HUN; FEA; 7	HUN; SPR; Ret	SPA; FEA; Ret	SPA; SPR; 13	MNZ; FEA; Ret	MNZ; SPR; Ret	YMC; FEA; 16	YMC; SPR; 10	16th	12
2011	Scuderia Coloni	IST; FEA; 14	IST; SPR; 12	CAT; FEA; Ret	CAT; SPR; Ret	MON; FEA; 13	MON; SPR; 15	VAL; FEA; 10	VAL; SPR; 6	SIL; FEA; 24	SIL; SPR; 18	NÜR; FEA; 11	NÜR; SPR; 10	HUN; FEA; 12	HUN; SPR; Ret	SPA; FEA; 16	SPA; SPR; 15	MNZ; FEA; Ret	MNZ; SPR; DNS			21st	1

==== Complete GP2 Asia Series results ====
(key) (Races in bold indicate pole position) (Races in italics indicate fastest lap)

Year	Entrant	1	2	3	4	5	6	7	8	9	10	11	12	DC	Points
2008	FMS International	DUB1; FEA; Ret	DUB1; SPR; 17	SEN; FEA; 9	SEN; SPR; 12	SEP; FEA; 11	SEP; SPR; 11	BHR; FEA; 15	BHR; SPR; 14	DUB2; FEA	DUB2; SPR			23rd	0
2008–09	David Price Racing	SHI; FEA; 16	SHI; SPR; 16	DUB; FEA; 15	DUB; SPR; C	BHR1; FEA; 18	BHR1; SPR; 18	LSL; FEA; 15	LSL; SPR; Ret	SEP; FEA; 13	SEP; SPR; Ret	BHR2; FEA; 13	BHR2; SPR; Ret	33rd	0
2009–10	David Price Racing	YMC1; FEA; 13	YMC1; SPR; 9	YMC2; FEA; 7	YMC2; SPR; 2	BHR1; FEA; 23	BHR1; SPR; 13	BHR2; FEA; 18	BHR2; SPR; Ret					13th	7
2011	Scuderia Coloni	YMC; FEA; 13	YMC; SPR; 5	IMO; FEA; 4	IMO; SPR; 5									8th	9
