= Christian Vietoris =

German racing driver (born 1989)

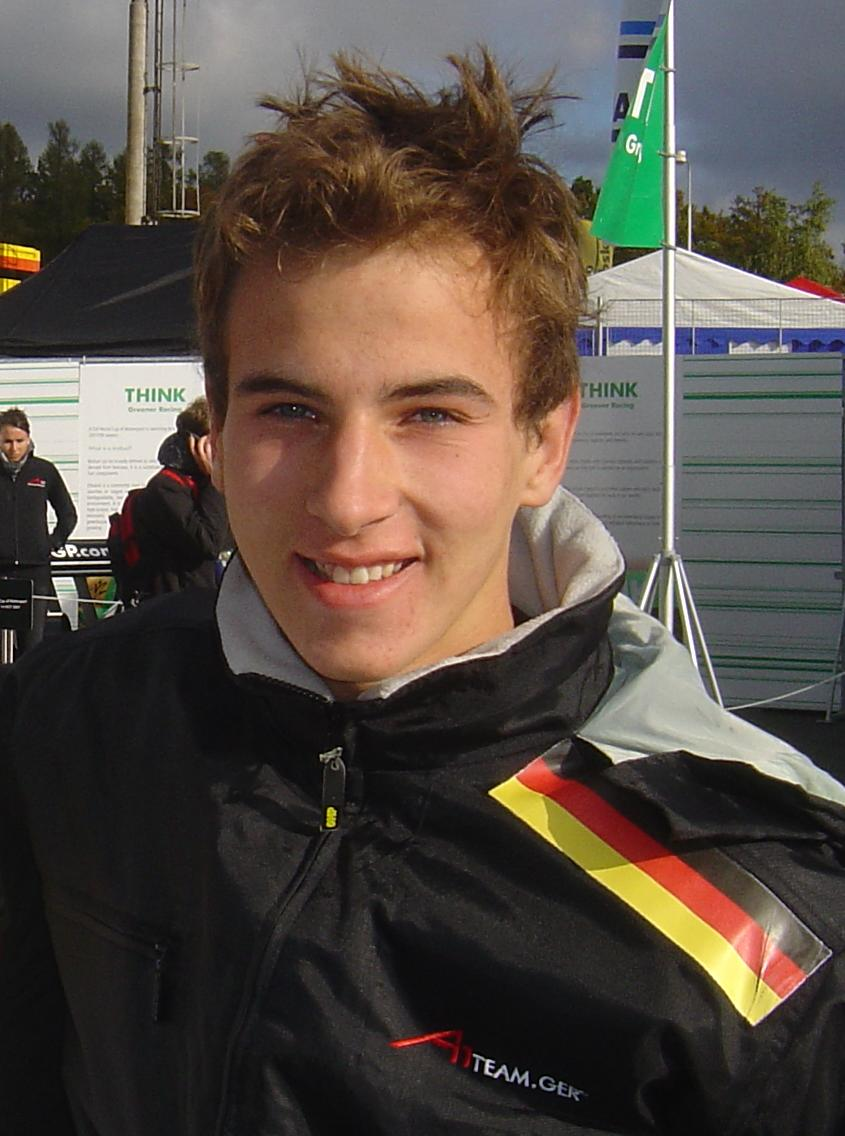
- Vietoris in 2007
- Nationality: (Germany) German
- Born: Christian Johannes Vietoris; 1 April 1989 (age 37) Gerolstein, Rhineland-Palatinate, West Germany

DTM career
- Debut season: 2011
- Current team: Mercedes-Benz DTM Team Mücke
- Categorisation: FIA Platinum
- Car number: 8
- Former teams: HWA AG, Persson Motorsport
- Starts: 76
- Wins: 1
- Poles: 3
- Fastest laps: 2
- Best finish: 4th in 2013, 2014
- Finished last season: 14th (60 pts)

Previous series
- 2010 2009–10 2008–09 2007 2006–07 2005–06: GP2 Series; GP2 Asia Series; Formula Three Euroseries; German Formula Three; A1 Grand Prix; Formula BMW ADAC

Championship titles
- 2006–07 2006: A1 Grand Prix (w/Hülkenberg); Formula BMW ADAC

Christian Johannes Vietoris (/viːˈtɔːrɪs/ vee-TOR-iss, German: [ˈkʁɪsti̯a(ː)n viːˈtoːʁɪs]; born 1 April 1989) is a German retired racing driver. He competed in the Deutsche Tourenwagen Masters, most recently for HWA Team. Vietoris has also been a part of the revitalized Mercedes-Benz Junior Team, together with Robert Wickens and Roberto Merhi. Vietoris made his debut in the DTM in 2011, driving for Persson Motorsport, before being promoted to HWA for the 2012 DTM season.

== Career ==
=== Karting ===
Vietoris started his career through karting, the most common entry point for all racing drivers, in 1994. Nine years after starting his karting career, the young German was the national Junior Kart champion and a year later came second Western German Karting Championship.

=== Formula BMW ===
In 2005, Vietoris moved up to Formula BMW ADAC with Eifelland Racing. Vietoris finished his first FBMW campaign sixteenth in the Drivers' Championship with fifteen points, sharing his position with fellow German Dominik Wasem. In 2006, Vietoris moved to Josef Kaufmann Racing, where he won the Drivers' Championship with 277 points and taking nine race wins, his nearest rival being Finland's Mika Mäki. As well as his German FBMW title, Vietoris won the Formula BMW World Final, ahead of other FBMW champions such as Robert Wickens, the 2006 US FBMW champion, and the British Formula BMW champion, Niall Breen, winning himself a test for the BMW Sauber F1 team.

Following his impressive performances in Formula BMW, Vietoris was picked by A1 Team Germany to replace Nico Hülkenberg for the Mexican round of the 2006–07 season.

=== Formula Three ===
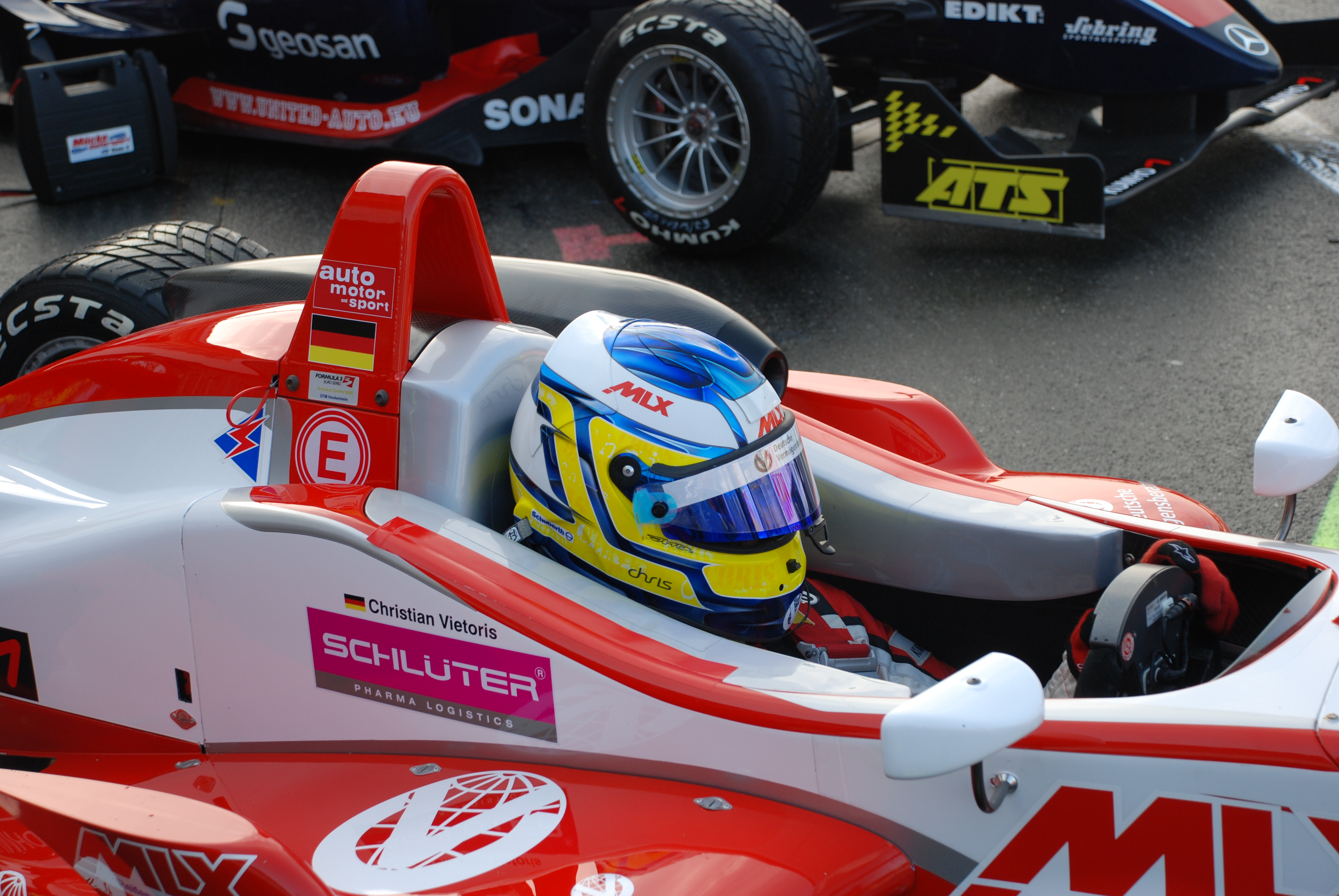
Vietoris competing at the opening round of the 2008 Formula Three Euroseries season at Hockenheim.

In 2007, Vietoris competed in the ATS Formel 3 Cup for Josef Kaufmann Racing, finishing in fifth. He moved on to the Formula Three Euroseries in 2008 for Mücke Motorsport. He had a solid season, ending up eighth in the championship with one win coming at the Norisring. He set a pair of fastest laps – at Mugello and Brands Hatch – and was on pole at the Nürburgring.

Vietoris continued in the F3 Euroseries in 2009 with Mücke Motorsport, finishing as runner-up to the dominant Jules Bianchi. Vietoris won four races over the course of the season, adding a further four podiums and a fastest lap at Brands once again, as he helped keep Mücke in contention for the teams title until he left for GP2 Asia.

=== GP2 series ===
Vietoris missed the final round of the F3 Euroseries season to join up with the DAMS team for a GP2 Asia Series test at the Yas Marina Circuit in Abu Dhabi. He raced in the 2009–10 season for the team. He moved to Racing Engineering for the 2010 main series, winning one race en route to ninth place in the drivers' championship. He missed the final round of the season due to appendicitis; his seat was taken by Ho-Pin Tung.

Vietoris remained with Racing Engineering for the 2011 GP2 Series season, alongside Dani Clos. After crashing heavily during the first round of the season at Istanbul, he complained of recurring headaches and was replaced by Álvaro Parente until he recovered and returned to the cockpit in Valencia. At Spa-Francorchamps, he took his first series pole position and converted it into victory, also setting his first fastest lap in the process. He also won the sprint race finale at Monza, rising to seventh in the drivers' championship.

=== DTM ===
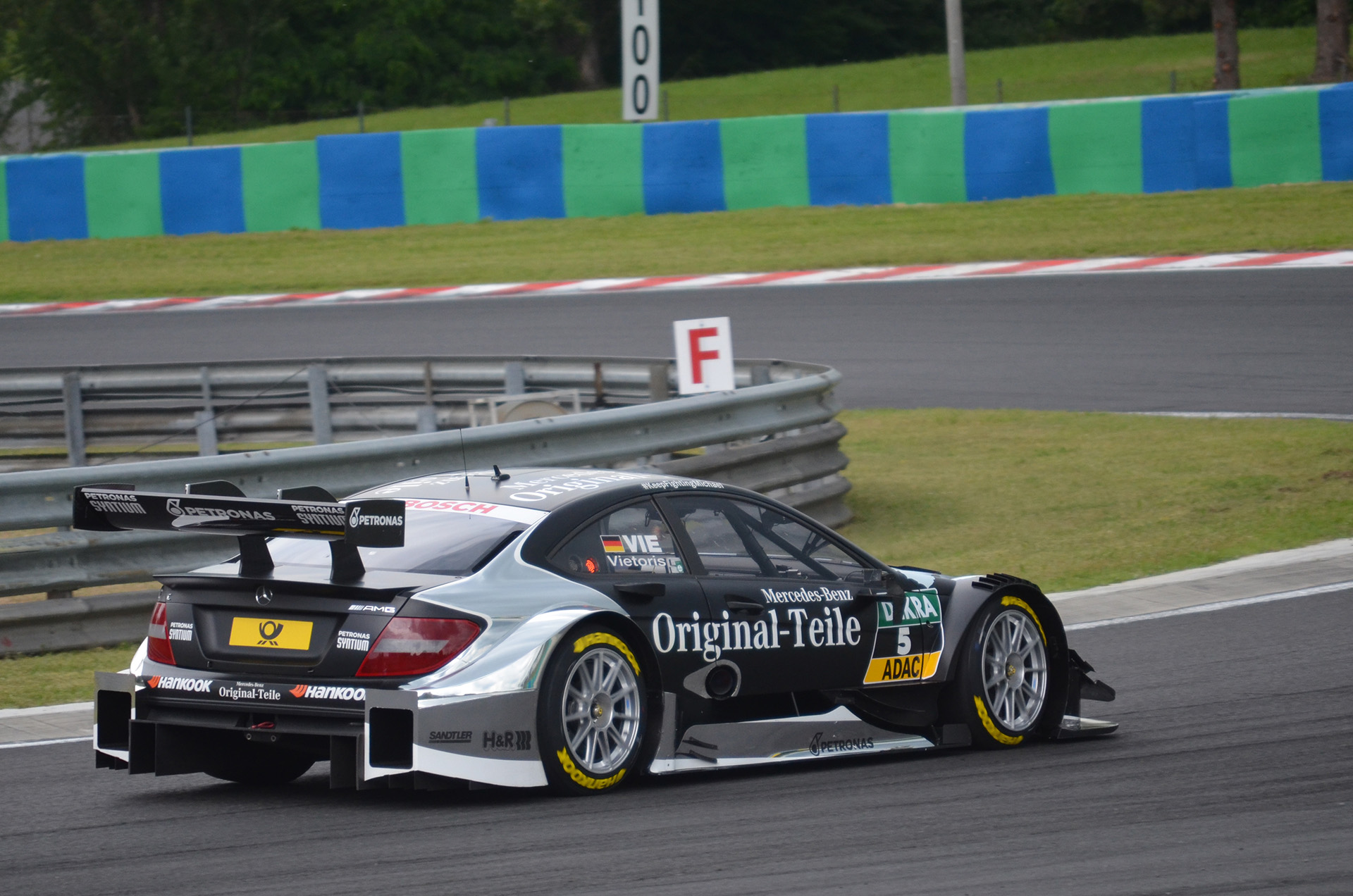
Vietoris driving for the HWA Team at Hungaroring during the 2014 DTM season

Vietoris made his debut in the DTM, dovetailing his 2011 GP2 campaign with a season driving a Persson Motorsport Mercedes in the Deutsche Tourenwagen Masters. His best result as a rookie was a 5th place at Oschersleben. Another highlight was reaching the semi-final at the non-points Showevent at the Olympic Stadium in München.

On 3 April 2012, Mercedes announced the revival of the Mercedes-Benz Junior Team that has guided several notable drivers in their racing careers like Heinz-Harald Frentzen, Karl Wendlinger and Michael Schumacher. With that announcement came the news that Vietoris, together with the reigning Formula 3 Euroseries champion Roberto Merhi and the reigning Formula Renault 3.5 Series champion Robert Wickens, would become a part of the new Junior Team and that the three of them would drive for the Junior Team in the 2012 DTM season.

Seven-time F1 World Champion Michael Schumacher was to be involved with the three drivers by serving as a mentor. Driving under the Junior Team-moniker meant for Vietoris that he would switch teams for his sophomore season in the DTM, trading in his place at Persson Motorsport for the elite team of Mercedes in the DTM, HWA Team, replacing Bruno Spengler, who left Mercedes for BMW.

== Records ==
Vietoris is the youngest driver ever to win an A1 Grand Prix race. He took the chequered flag during the 2007–08 A1 Grand Prix of Nations, New Zealand at Taupo Motorsport Park at just 18 years, nine months and 19 days old, beating the previous record for youngest A1GP winner by exactly five months. That record was held by the team's former driver, Nico Hülkenberg, who won on his debut at Zandvoort in 2006.

== Racing record ==
=== Career summary ===
Season	Series	Team	Races	Wins	Poles	F/Laps	Podiums	Points	Position
2005	Formula BMW ADAC	Eifelland Racing	19	0	0	0	0	17	16th
2006	Formula BMW ADAC	Josef Kaufmann Racing	18	9	9	3	16	277	**1st**
2007	German Formula 3 Championship	Josef Kaufmann Racing	12	1	2	1	7	62	6th
2008	Formula 3 Euro Series	Mücke Motorsport	19	1	1	2	4	36	6th
2009	Formula 3 Euro Series	Mücke Motorsport	18	4	0	1	8	75	**2nd**
2009–10	GP2 Asia Series	DAMS	8	1	0	0	1	9	10th
2010	GP2 Series	Racing Engineering	17	1	0	0	3	29	9th
2011	GP2 Series	Racing Engineering	14	2	1	1	3	35	7th
2011	Deutsche Tourenwagen Masters	Persson Motorsport	10	0	0	0	0	4	14th
2012	Deutsche Tourenwagen Masters	HWA Team	10	0	0	0	0	25	12th
2013	Deutsche Tourenwagen Masters	HWA Team	10	0	1	2	4	71	4th
2014	Deutsche Tourenwagen Masters	HWA Team	10	1	0	0	2	69	4th
2015	Deutsche Tourenwagen Masters	HWA AG	18	0	1	0	1	56	16th
2015	24 Hours of Nürburgring - SP9	Team Zakspeed	1	0	0	0	0	N/A	DNF
2016	Deutsche Tourenwagen Masters	Mercedes-Benz DTM Team Mücke	18	0	1	0	2	60	14th
2016	24 Hours of Nürburgring - SP9	AMG-Team HTP Motorsport	1	0	0	0	1	N/A	**2nd**
2018	Blancpain GT Series Endurance Cup	Strakka Racing	2	0	0	0	0	6	41st
2018	Intercontinental GT Challenge	Mercedes-AMG Team Strakka Racing	1	0	0	0	0	4	23rd

=== Complete Formula 3 Euro Series results ===
key) (Races in bold indicate pole position) (Races in italics indicate fastest lap)

Year	Entrant	Chassis	Engine	1	2	3	4	5	6	7	8	9	10	11	12	13	14	15	16	17	18	19	20	DC	Points
2008	Mücke Motorsport	Dallara F308/050	Mercedes	HOC; 1; 7	HOC; 2; 2	MUG; 1; 28†	MUG; 2; 19	PAU; 1; 5	PAU; 2; 4	NOR; 1; 6	NOR; 2; 1	ZAN; 1; 13	ZAN; 2; 11	**NÜR**; **1** Ret	NÜR; 2 Ret	BRH; 1; 5	BRH; 2 Ret	CAT; 1; 3	CAT; 2; 2	BUG; 1; 28†	BUG; 2; 10	HOC; 1 EX	HOC; 2 Ret	6th	36
2009	Mücke Motorsport	Dallara F308/050	Mercedes	HOC; 1; 7	HOC; 2; 2	LAU; 1; 8	LAU; 2; 1	NOR; 1; 6	NOR; 2; 1	ZAN; 1; 3	ZAN; 2; 4	OSC; 1; 4	OSC; 2; 1	NÜR; 1; 8	NÜR; 2; 2	BRH; 1; 3	BRH; 2; 4	CAT; 1; 6	CAT; 2; 4	DIJ; 1; 1	DIJ; 2; 6	HOC; 1	HOC; 2	**2nd**	**75**

^{†} Driver did not finish the race, but was classified as he completed over 90% of the race distance.

=== Complete A1 Grand Prix results ===
(key) (Races in bold indicate pole position) (Races in italics indicate fastest lap)

Year	Entrant	1	2	3	4	5	6	7	8	9	10	11	12	13	14	15	16	17	18	19	20	21	22	DC	Points
2006–07	Germany	NED; SPR	NED; FEA	CZE; SPR	CZE; FEA	CHN; SPR	CHN; FEA	MYS; SPR	MYS; FEA	IDN; SPR	IDN; FEA	NZL; SPR	NZL; FEA	AUS; SPR	AUS; FEA	RSA; SPR	RSA; FEA	MEX; SPR; Ret	MEX; FEA; 9	CHN; SPR	CHN; FEA	GBR; SPR	GBR; SPR	**1st**	**128**
2007–08	Germany	NED; SPR; 6	NED; FEA; 9	CZE; SPR; 7	CZE; FEA; 8	MYS; SPR	MYS; FEA	ZHU; SPR	ZHU; FEA	NZL; SPR; 2	NZL; FEA; 1	AUS; SPR	AUS; FEA	RSA; SPR	RSA; FEA	MEX; SPR	MEX; FEA	SHA; SPR	SHA; FEA	GBR; SPR	GBR; SPR			8th	83

=== Complete GP2 series results ===
(key) (Races in bold indicate pole position) (Races in italics indicate fastest lap)

Year	Entrant	1	2	3	4	5	6	7	8	9	10	11	12	13	14	15	16	17	18	19	20	DC	Points
2010	Racing Engineering	CAT; FEA; Ret	CAT; SPR; 18	MON; FEA; 14	MON; SPR; DNS	IST; FEA; 7	IST; SPR; Ret	VAL; FEA; 12	VAL; SPR; Ret	SIL; FEA; 6	SIL; SPR; 10	HOC; FEA; Ret	HOC; SPR; 10	HUN; FEA; 2	HUN; SPR; 2	SPA; FEA; 11	SPA; SPR; Ret	MNZ; FEA; 4	MNZ; SPR; 1	YMC; FEA	YMC; SPR	9th	29
2011	Racing Engineering	IST; FEA; 11	IST; SPR; Ret	CAT; FEA	CAT; SPR	MON; FEA	MON; SPR	VAL; FEA; Ret	VAL; SPR; 13	SIL; FEA; 2	SIL; SPR; Ret	NÜR; FEA; Ret	NÜR; SPR; 4	HUN; FEA; 8	HUN; SPR; 10	**SPA**; **FEA**; 1	SPA; SPR; 13	MNZ; FEA; 6	MNZ; SPR; 1			7th	35

==== Complete GP2 Asia Series results ====
(key) (Races in bold indicate pole position) (Races in italics indicate fastest lap)

Year	Entrant	1	2	3	4	5	6	7	8	DC	Points
2009–10	DAMS	YMC1; FEA; 6	YMC1; SPR; 1	YMC2; FEA; Ret	YMC2; SPR; 14	BHR1; FEA; 14	BHR1; SPR; 9	BHR2; FEA; Ret	BHR2; SPR; 14	10th	9

=== Complete DTM results ===
(key) (Races in bold indicate pole position) (Races in italics indicate fastest lap)

Year	Team	Car	1	2	3	4	5	6	7	8	9	10	11	12	13	14	15	16	17	18	Pos	Points
2011	Persson Motorsport	AMG-Mercedes C-Klasse 2008	HOC; 13	ZAN; 15	SPL; 15	LAU; 9	NOR; 11	NÜR; 13	BRH; 13	OSC; 5	VAL; 12	HOC; Ret									14th	4
2012	HWA Team	DTM AMG Mercedes C-Coupé	HOC; 4	LAU; 11	BRH; 6	SPL; Ret	NOR; 8	NÜR; 16	ZAN; Ret	OSC; 12	VAL; 12	HOC; 10									12th	25
2013	HWA Team	DTM AMG Mercedes C-Coupé	HOC; 3	BRH; 8	SPL; 7	**LAU**; 3	NOR; 3	MSC; 10	NÜR; 3	OSC; 18	ZAN; 15	HOC; 7									4th	77
2014	HWA Team	DTM AMG Mercedes C-Coupé	HOC; 15	OSC; 1	HUN; 20†	NOR; 21†	MSC; 7	SPL; 9	NÜR; 6	LAU; 2	ZAN; 5	HOC; 14									4th	69
2015	HWA AG	DTM AMG Mercedes C-Coupé	HOC; 1; 14	HOC; 2; 11	LAU; 1; 17	LAU; 2; 7	**NOR**; **1**; 4	NOR; 2; 2	ZAN; 1; 12	ZAN; 2; 8	SPL; 1; 4	SPL; 2; 8	MSC; 1 Ret	MSC; 2; 20	OSC; 1; 18	OSC; 2; 21	NÜR; 1; 15	NÜR; 2; 14	HOC; 1; 12	HOC; 2 Ret	16th	56
2016	Mercedes-Benz DTM Team Mücke	Mercedes-AMG C63 DTM	HOC; 1; 5	HOC; 2; 14	SPL; 1 Ret	SPL; 2; 17	LAU; 1; 5	LAU; 2; 7	**NOR**; **1**; 10	NOR; 2; 15	ZAN; 1; 3	ZAN; 2; 20†	MSC; 1; 23	MSC; 2; 14	NÜR; 1; 13	NÜR; 2; 17	HUN; 1; 17	HUN; 2; 14	HOC; 1; 22	HOC; 2; 2	14th	60

^{†} Driver retired, but was classified as they completed 75% of the winner's race distance.

Sporting positions
Preceded by Nico Hülkenberg	Formula BMW ADAC; Champion; 2006	Succeeded by Jens Klingmann
Preceded by Marco Holzer	Formula BMW World Final; Winner; 2006	Succeeded by Philipp Eng
Preceded by Nicolas Lapierre; Alexandre Prémat (Team France)	A1 Grand Prix; Champion with Nico Hülkenberg (Team Germany); 2006–07	Succeeded by Neel Jani (Team Switzerland)
