= 2010 Istanbul Park GP2 Series round =

(Turkey) 2010 Turkish GP2 round
Round details
- Round 3 of 10 rounds in the 2010 GP2 Series
- Istanbul Park
- Location: Istanbul Park; Istanbul, Turkey
- Course: Permanent racing facility 5.34 km (3.32 mi)

GP2 Series

Feature race
- Date: 29 May 2010
- Laps: 34

Pole position
Driver	(Italy) Davide Valsecchi	iSport International
- Time: 1:34.860

Podium
First	(Venezuela) Pastor Maldonado	Rapax
Second	(Italy) Davide Valsecchi	iSport International
Third	(United Kingdom) Sam Bird	ART Grand Prix

Fastest lap
Driver	(Venezuela) Pastor Maldonado	Rapax
- Time: 1:37.010 (on lap 15)

Sprint race
- Date: 30 May 2010
- Laps: 23

Podium
First	(Spain) Dani Clos	Racing Engineering
Second	(Brazil) Luiz Razia	Rapax
Third	(Netherlands) Giedo van der Garde	Barwa Addax Team

Fastest lap
Driver	(United Kingdom) Oliver Turvey	iSport International
- Time: 1:36.770 (on lap 3)

The 2010 Turkish GP2 round was a GP2 Series motor race held on May 29 and May 30, 2010 at the Istanbul Park in Istanbul, Turkey. It was the third race of the 2010 GP2 Series. The race was used to support the 2010 Turkish Grand Prix.

== Report ==
=== Feature Race ===
Pastor Maldonado became the fifth winner in as many races in GP2 in 2010 following a dominant victory in Turkey. Rapax driver Maldonado got past polesitter Davide Valsecchi (iSport) at the start and never looked troubled, lapping up to a second quicker than his rivals before slowing down in the final stages of the race and settling for a huge victory margin of 17.9 seconds. There was rather more competition for the remaining podium places. Valsecchi spent the first stint trying to hold off Sergio Pérez, only for the Mexican to leapfrog him in the pits. But Pérez's pace began to fade dramatically as the race progressed and Valsecchi capitalised with a nice move at the end of lap 26 to reclaim second. That was Valsecchi's afternoon sorted, but Pérez now had ART's Sam Bird to worry about, and after a prolonged battled the Briton came out on top to steal the final podium spot, leaving Pérez to just barely hold off Addax team-mate Giedo van der Garde for fourth. By comparison, Maldonado's Rapax team-mate Luiz Razia had a relatively serene drive to sixth, but there was more action just behind him. DPR's Giacomo Ricci and Racing Engineering's Christian Vietoris were disputing the final point for eighth when they made contact and sailed off the track, allowing Ricci's stablemate Michael Herck past. Vietoris continued, but Ricci was forced to retire. Not content with provisional pole for Sunday, Herck then dispensed with Racing Engineering's Dani Clos for seventh, and Clos later dropped behind Vietoris to inadvertently give the German pole position for the sprint race. iSport's third-place qualifier Oliver Turvey had a terrible afternoon, losing two spots off the start and then being dealt a drivethrough penalty for moving twice to defend his position. It was while honouring that penalty that he was then picked up for speeding in pitlane, resulting in another drive-through and an eventual finishing position of 15th. Scuderia Coloni lost both cars late in the race when Vladimir Arabadzhiev crashed into the tyre wall with two laps remaining and Alberto Valerio spun and stalled moments later, while Super Nova's Marcus Ericsson was forced to park at mid-distance when his engine exploded. The other major incident occurred much earlier, when Spain feature race winner Charles Pic and ART's Jules Bianchi found themselves on the same patch of Turn 3 at the same time; the resultant collision putting both out of the race.

=== Sprint Race ===
Dani Clos claimed his maiden GP2 victory with a dominant lights-to-flag win in the sprint race at Istanbul Park. The 21-year-old held off the challenge of Racing Engineering team-mate Christian Vietoris into the first corner to lead, taking the chequered flag 23 laps later 8.8 seconds ahead of Rapax driver Luiz Razia to become the sixth GP2 winner in six races in 2010. Vietoris had looked on course to make it a comfortable one-two for the Spanish team, only to retire with a mechanical problem, which left Razia to take an easy runner-up spot. Addax's Giedo van de Garde claimed third place after getting ahead of third-place starter Michael Herck (DPR) on the opening lap, but he had to absorb pressure from race one pole position starter David Valsecchi throughout the race. Herck shadowed iSport's Valsecchi to the finish to take fifth place, with race one winner Pastor Maldonado (Rapax) taking the final point for sixth place to consolidate his championship lead but unable to get on terms with the three-car group ahead of him. DAMS driver Jérôme d'Ambrosio, a race-winner in Monaco in the previous round, lost seventh place to the inspired Sergio Pérez on the last lap. The Barwa Addax driver had started from the back of the grid after being found to be underweight following his fourth-place finish in the feature race, but made up 11 places in the opening laps. ART's Sam Bird ended up 10th after being passed by d'Ambrosio, Pérez and Ho-Pin Tung in quick succession in the closing laps after suddenly dropping to around two seconds off the pace. His team-mate Jules Bianchi was involved in some hectic midfield racing but could only make it up to 13th after his early retirement yesterday. Arden's Charles Pic – the man Bianchi tangled with in the feature race – missed today's round due to food poisoning. Former McLaren AUTOSPORT BRDC award winner Oliver Turvey's nightmare weekend ended with 18th place after stalling on the grid and then being hit with a drive-through penalty.

== Classification ==
=== Qualifying ===
Pos	No	Name	Team	Time	Grid
1	10	(Italy) Davide Valsecchi	iSport International	1:34.860	1
2	15	(Venezuela) Pastor Maldonado	Rapax	1:34.875	2
3	9	(United Kingdom) Oliver Turvey	iSport International	1:35.135	3
4	4	(Mexico) Sergio Pérez	Barwa Addax Team	1:35.194	4
5	2	(United Kingdom) Sam Bird	ART Grand Prix	1:35.267	5
6	3	(Netherlands) Giedo van der Garde	Barwa Addax Team	1:35.348	6
7	7	(Spain) Dani Clos	Racing Engineering	1:35.364	7
8	16	(France) Charles Pic	Arden International Motorsport	1:35.411	8
9	20	(Brazil) Alberto Valerio	Scuderia Coloni	1:35.491	9
10	14	(Brazil) Luiz Razia	Rapax	1:35.527	10
11	8	(Germany) Christian Vietoris	Racing Engineering	1:35.664	11
12	1	(France) Jules Bianchi	ART Grand Prix	1:35.676	12
13	27	(Italy) Giacomo Ricci	DPR	1:35.750	13
14	26	(Romania) Michael Herck	DPR	1:35.762	14
15	18	(United Kingdom) Max Chilton	Ocean Racing Technology	1:35.842	15
16	11	(Belgium) Jérôme d'Ambrosio	DAMS	1:35.926	16
17	5	(Czech Republic) Josef Král	Super Nova Racing	1:35.955	17
18	25	(South Africa) Adrian Zaugg	Trident Racing	1:35.957	18
19	6	(Sweden) Marcus Ericsson	Super Nova Racing	1:35.973	19
20	24	(Venezuela) Johnny Cecotto Jr.	Trident Racing	1:36.047	20
21	19	(Switzerland) Fabio Leimer	Ocean Racing Technology	1:36.167	21
22	21	(Bulgaria) Vladimir Arabadzhiev	Scuderia Coloni	1:36.564	22
23	17	(Venezuela) Rodolfo González	Arden International Motorsport	1:36.628	24^{1}
24	12	(China) Ho-Pin Tung	DAMS	1:36.663	23

Notes

1. – Rodolfo González received a three-place grid penalty because of impeding Michael Herck in qualifying.

=== Feature Race ===
Pos	No	Driver	Team	Laps	Time/Retired	Grid	Points
1	15	(Venezuela) Pastor Maldonado	Rapax	32	0:52:33.219	2	10 + 1
2	10	(Italy) Davide Valsecchi	iSport International	32	+19.531	1	8 + 2
3	2	(United Kingdom) Sam Bird	ART Grand Prix	32	+23.327	5	6
4	3	(Netherlands) Giedo van der Garde	Barwa Addax Team	32	+26.129	6	5
5	14	(Brazil) Luiz Razia	Rapax	32	+26.746	10	4
6	26	(Romania) Michael Herck	DPR	32	+30.444	14	3
7	8	(Germany) Christian Vietoris	Racing Engineering	32	+36.719	11	2
8	7	(Spain) Dani Clos	Racing Engineering	32	+41.469	7	1
9	18	(United Kingdom) Max Chilton	Ocean Racing Technology	32	+48.582	15	
10	11	(Belgium) Jérôme d'Ambrosio	DAMS	32	+49.848	16	
11	12	(China) Ho-Pin Tung	DAMS	32	+50.315	23	
12	24	(Venezuela) Johnny Cecotto Jr.	Trident Racing	32	+55.996	20	
13	19	(Switzerland) Fabio Leimer	Ocean Racing Technology	32	+1:06.801	21	
14	9	(United Kingdom) Oliver Turvey	iSport International	32	+1:08.392	3	
15	5	(Czech Republic) Josef Král	Super Nova Racing	32	+1:22.464	17	
16	17	(Venezuela) Rodolfo González	Arden International Motorsport	32	+1:23.789	24	
17	20	(Italy) Alberto Valerio	Scuderia Coloni	29	Spun off/Stalled	9	
Ret	21	(Bulgaria) Vladimir Arabadzhiev	Scuderia Coloni	27	Accident	21	
Ret	25	(South Africa) Adrian Zaugg	Trident Racing	27	+1:16.292	18	
Ret	27	(Italy) Giacomo Ricci	DPR	25	Collision	13	
Ret	6	(Sweden) Marcus Ericsson	Super Nova Racing	11	Engine	19	
Ret	16	(France) Charles Pic	Arden International Motorsport	1	Collision	8	
Ret	1	(France) Jules Bianchi	ART Grand Prix	1	Collision	12	
DSQ	4	(Mexico) Sergio Pérez	Barwa Addax Team	32	Disqualified	4	

=== Sprint Race ===
Pos	No	Driver	Team	Laps	Time/Retired	Grid	Points
1	7	(Spain) Dani Clos	Racing Engineering	23	0:37:25.211	1	6 + 1
2	14	(Brazil) Luiz Razia	Rapax	23	+8.870	4	5
3	3	(Netherlands) Giedo van der Garde	Barwa Addax Team	23	+12.996	5	4
4	10	(Italy) Davide Valsecchi	iSport International	23	+13.479	7	3
5	26	(Romania) Michael Herck	DPR	23	+14.503	3	2
6	15	(Venezuela) Pastor Maldonado	Rapax	23	+19.118	8	1
7	4	(Mexico) Sergio Pérez	Barwa Addax Team	23	+20.080	24	
8	11	(Belgium) Jérôme d'Ambrosio	DAMS	23	+20.488	10	
9	12	(China) Ho-Pin Tung	DAMS	23	+23.868	11	
10	2	(United Kingdom) Sam Bird	ART Grand Prix	23	+29.560	6	
11	18	(United Kingdom) Max Chilton	Ocean Racing Technology	23	+31.666	9	
12	24	(Venezuela) Johnny Cecotto Jr.	Trident Racing	23	+36.159	12	
13	1	(France) Jules Bianchi	ART Grand Prix	23	+40.549	23	
14	5	(Czech Republic) Josef Král	Super Nova Racing	23	+40.625	15	
15	19	(Switzerland) Fabio Leimer	Ocean Racing Technology	23	+48.444	13	
16	17	(Venezuela) Rodolfo González	Arden International Motorsport	23	+48.682	16	
17	27	(Italy) Giacomo Ricci	DPR	23	+49.061	20	
18	9	(United Kingdom) Oliver Turvey	iSport International	22	+1 lap	14	
19	20	(Italy) Alberto Valerio	Scuderia Coloni	21	+2 laps	17	
Ret	25	(South Africa) Adrian Zaugg	Trident Racing	17	Retired	19	
Ret	8	(Germany) Christian Vietoris	Racing Engineering	9	Retired	2	
Ret	6	(Sweden) Marcus Ericsson	Super Nova Racing	5	Retired	21	
Ret	21	(Bulgaria) Vladimir Arabadzhiev	Scuderia Coloni	3	Retired	18	
DNS	16	(France) Charles Pic	Arden International Motorsport	0	Did not start	22	

== Standings after the round ==
Drivers' Championship standings

Pos	Driver	Points
1	(Venezuela) Pastor Maldonado	27
2	(Spain) Dani Clos	23
3	(Brazil) Luiz Razia	20
4	(Mexico) Sergio Pérez	17
5	(Netherlands) Giedo van der Garde	17

Teams' Championship standings

Pos	Team	Points
1	(Italy) Rapax	47
2	(Spain) Barwa Addax Team	34
3	(Spain) Racing Engineering	25
4	(France) ART Grand Prix	22
5	(United Kingdom) iSport International	19

- Note: Only the top five positions are included for both sets of standings.

== See also ==
- 2010 Turkish Grand Prix
- 2010 Istanbul Park GP3 Series round

Previous round: 2010 Monaco GP2 round	GP2 Series; 2010 season	Next round: 2010 Valencia GP2 Series round
Previous round: 2009 Turkish GP2 round	Turkish GP2 round	Next round: 2011 Turkish GP2 round
