= 2011 Imola GP2 Asia Series round =

Motor races

(Italy) 2011 Imola GP2 round
Round details
- Round 2 of 2 rounds in the 2011 GP2 Series
- Autodromo Enzo e Dino Ferrari
- Location: Autodromo Enzo e Dino Ferrari, Imola, Emilia-Romagna, Italy
- Course: Permanent racing facility 4.909 km (3.050 mi)

GP2 Series

Feature race
- Date: 19 March 2011
- Laps: 35

Pole position
Driver	(France) Romain Grosjean	DAMS
- Time: 1:27.067

Podium
First	(France) Romain Grosjean	DAMS
Second	(Netherlands) Giedo van der Garde	Barwa Addax Team
Third	(France) Jules Bianchi	Lotus ART

Fastest lap
Driver	(France) Romain Grosjean	DAMS
- Time: 1:28.097 (on lap 32)

Sprint race
- Date: 20 March 2011
- Laps: 25

Podium
First	(Spain) Dani Clos	Racing Engineering
Second	(Switzerland) Fabio Leimer	Rapax
Third	(Netherlands) Giedo van der Garde	Barwa Addax Team

Fastest lap
Driver	(France) Romain Grosjean	DAMS
- Time: 1:28.772 (on lap 8)

The 2011 Imola GP2 Asia Series round was a pair of motor races held on 19 and 20 March 2011 at the Autodromo Enzo e Dino Ferrari in Imola, Emilia-Romagna, Italy as part of the GP2 Asia Series. It was the season-ending round of the 2011 GP2 Asia Series and was a standalone event after the two Bahrain rounds scheduled for February and March 2011 were cancelled due to civil unrest in the country. The first event, a 35-lap feature race, was won by DAMS driver Romain Grosjean from pole position. Giedo van der Garde finished second for Barwa Addax Team and Lotus ART racer Jules Bianchi was third. The next day, Dani Clos of Racing Engineering won the 25-lap sprint race with Rapax's Fabio Leimer and van der Garde second and third.

Grosjean won pole position for the feature race by setting the fastest lap in qualifying and maintained the lead at the start. He blocked van der Garde from overtaking him on lap one and pulled way from the fourth lap onward to claim his first GP2 Series victory of the season and his first since the 2009 Monaco round. Fauzy started from pole position in the sprint race after coming eighth in the feature event but a slow getaway lost him the lead to the fast starting Clos into the first corner. Clos came under pressure from Leimer throughout the event but he fended off his challenges each time and achieved victory.

Grosjean's results won him a second GP2 Series Drivers' Championship including the 2008 GP2 Asia Series after the leader entering the round Bianchi failed to finish the sprint race because he was caught up in a chain-reaction accident caused by Fauzy on the first lap. Van Der Garde moved him from seventh to third while Stefano Coletti and Leimer were fourth and fifth. DAMS claimed the Teams' Championship while Lotus ART ended the season second with Barwa Addax Team third.

== Background ==
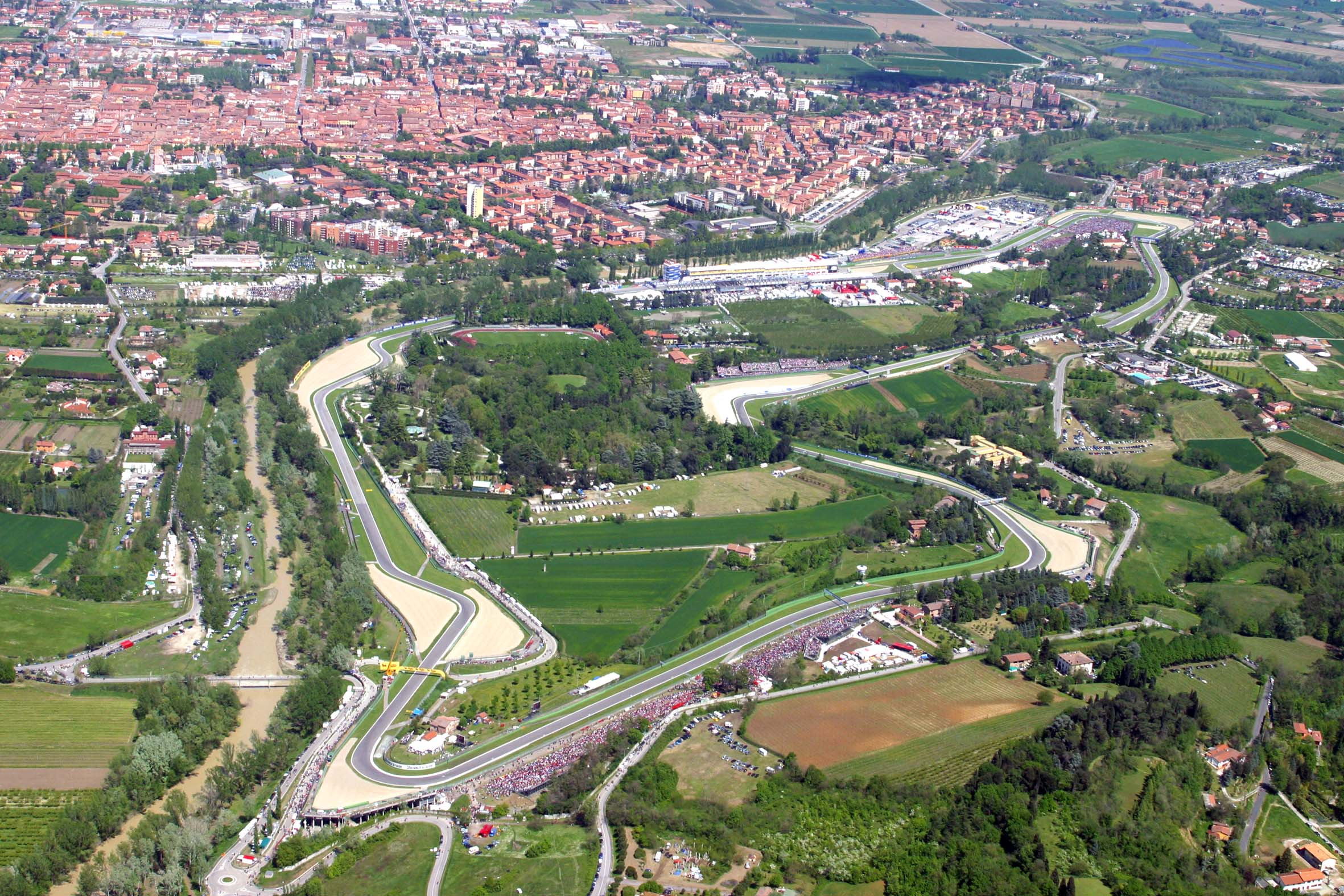
Autodromo Enzo e Dino Ferrari, where the race was held

Following the cancellation of the two scheduled Bahrain rounds for February and March 2011 at the request of the Bahrain Motorsport Federation because of civil unrest in the country, the GP2 Asia Series sought an alternative venue to host its next round with a stand-alone venue in Europe and the Losail International Circuit in Qatar mooted as possible replacements. It was announced in early March that the replacement to hold the season-ending round of the 2011 GP2 Asia Series would be held at the Autodromo Enzo e Dino Ferrari circuit in the Emilia-Romagna commune of Imola on 19 and 20 March. GP2 Series CEO Bruno Michel said that while he was aware the Italian event was "quite peculiar", the track's resurfaced layout and improved facilities made Imola ideal to hold the series' final event: "It was important for everyone to have one last round, and with the tests in Europe starting soon and the logistical requirements, we had to find a European venue. We had to be quick and think on our feet and we are happy to return to Imola." Tyre supplier Pirelli brought the medium compound tyre to the race because it was considered highly adaptable to the circuit.

Before the race Lotus ART driver Jules Bianchi led the Drivers' Championship with 12 points, two ahead of Romain Grosjean in second, who in turn was a further point in front of equal third-place competitors Davide Valsecchi and Marcus Ericsson. Josef Král was fifth on eight points. Lotus ART were leading the Teams' Championship with 12 points; Racing Engineering were one point behind in second place and DAMS were a further point adrift in third position. Team AirAsia were in fourth place with nine points and Arden International were fifth with eight points. There were 13 teams of 2 participants each making up 26 drivers in total entered for the race and all used the Dallara GP2/11 chassis. There was one driver change for the round. Having driven for Scuderia Coloni at the Abu Dhabi round, James Jakes elected not to compete at Imola after testing for Dale Coyne Racing in the IndyCar Series in the week leading up to Imola and his car was driven by experienced GP2 Series participant Luca Filippi.

== Practice and qualifying ==
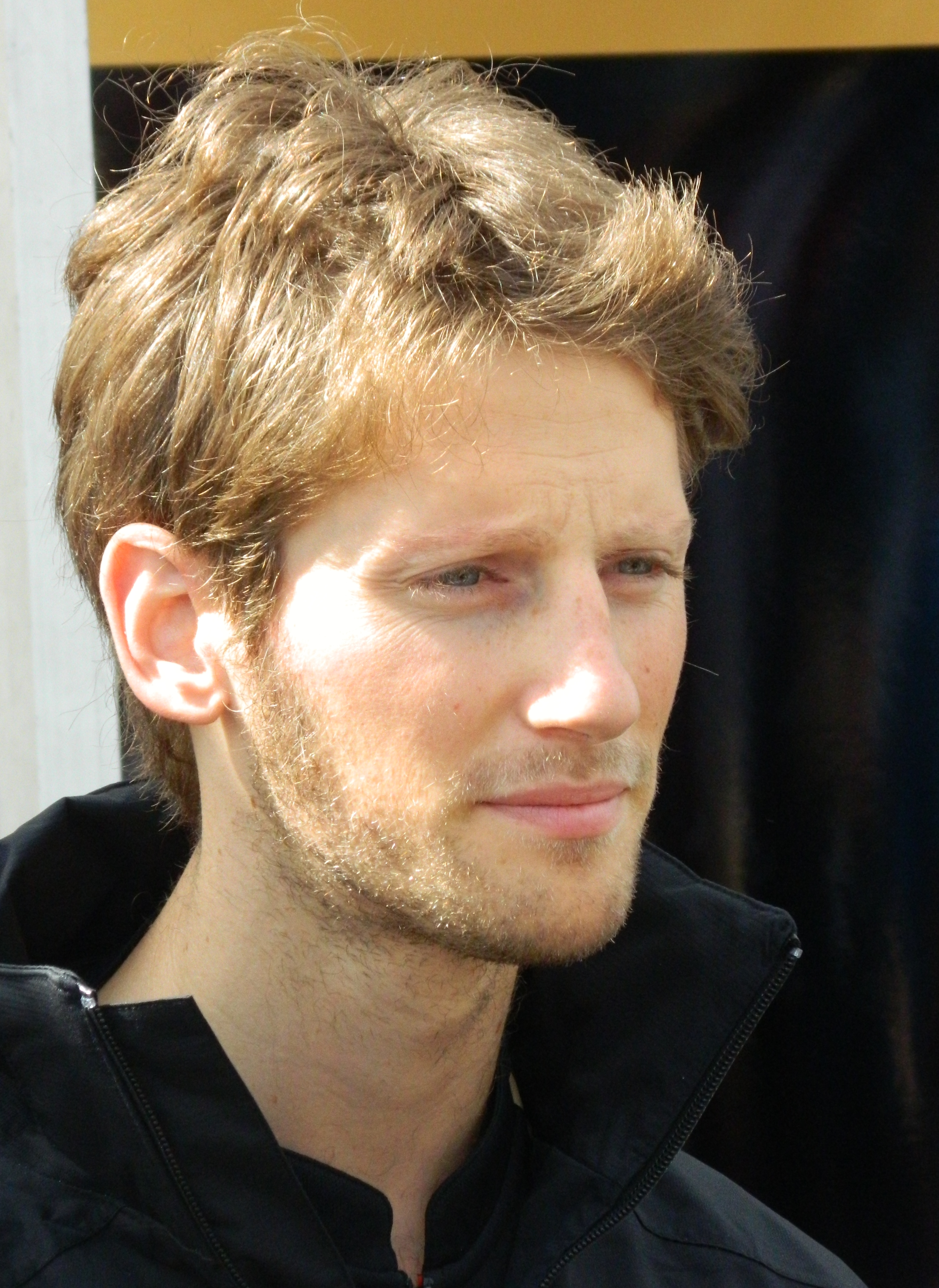
Romain Grosjean had his second consecutive pole position of the season and won the feature race the day after.

The event was the first GP2 Series round to be held at the Autodromo Enzo e Dino Ferrari since 2006 so race officials added an additional practice session after the usual half an hour worth of running to enable teams and drivers to familiarise themselves with the circuit. Lap times improved as drivers enhanced their understanding of the circuit and track conditions changed. In the first practice session, Giedo van der Garde was fastest with a lap time of 1 minute, 29.095 seconds, almost three-tenths of a second faster than Mikhail Aleshin in second. Fabio Leimer, Jolyon Palmer, Esteban Gutiérrez, Andrea Caldarelli, Valsecchi, Stefano Coletti, Julián Leal and Michael Herck were in positions three through ten. Ericsson stopped at Variante Villeneuve turn in the opening minutes and Grosjean went off the track at the following corner soon after. Bird set the fastest lap of the second practice session of 1 minute, 28.312 seconds; completing the top ten were Van der Garde, Leimer third, Coletti, Dani Clos, Valsecchi, Max Chilton, Herck, Pål Varhaug and Nathanaël Berthon. Grosjean and Ericcson missed the session because their cars were being repaired while Fillipi had mechanical issues. Gutiérrez lost control of his car in the closing period at Variante Villeneuve turn and broke his front wing.

Friday afternoon's qualifying session ran for 30-minutes. The session determined the starting order for the first race with the drivers' fastest lap times. The pole position winner earned two points in the Drivers' and Teams' Championships. Qualifying was held in sunny weather. Grosjean clinched his second pole position of the season with a new track series record of 1 minute, 27.067 seconds set in the final seconds. He was joined on the grid's front row by Bird who was 0.317 seconds slower and had pole position until Grosjean's lap. Herck took what Autosport considered an "impressive" third having also been on pole position with Bianchi fourth fastest. Van der Garde in fifth led a close group of runners consisting of Král securing sixth place and Ericsson in seventh. Palmer was eighth, Valsecchi ninth and Aleshin tenth. Luiz Razia was the fastest driver not to qualify in the top ten and the rest of the field lined up as Caldarelli, Leimer, Oliver Turvey, Gutiérrez, Coletti, Rodolfo González, Chilton, Varhaug and Clos, Fairuz Fauzy, Johnny Cecotto Jr., Charles Pic, Leal, Berthon, and Filippi who was unable to set a timed lap because of a driveshaft problem affecting his car and was forced to start at the back of the field. The session was briefly stopped when bodywork was located in the centre of the track and marshals were dispatched to retrieve it.

=== Qualifying classification ===
Final qualifying classification
Pos.	No.	Driver	Team	Time	Grid
1	9	(France) Romain Grosjean	DAMS	1:27.067	1
2	2	(United Kingdom) Sam Bird	iSport International	1:27.384	2
3	11	(Romania) Michael Herck	Scuderia Coloni	1:27.558	3
4	5	(France) Jules Bianchi	Lotus ART	1:27.676	4
5	17	(Netherlands) Giedo van der Garde	Barwa Addax Team	1:27:737	5
6	3	(Czech Republic) Josef Král	Arden International	1:27.834	6
7	1	(Sweden) Marcus Ericsson	iSport International	1:27.872	7
8	4	(United Kingdom) Jolyon Palmer	Arden International	1:27.898	8
9	27	(Italy) Davide Valsecchi	Team AirAsia	1:27.909	9
10	27	(Russia) Mikhail Aleshin	Carlin	1:27:988	10
11	26	(Brazil) Luiz Razia	Team AirAsia	1:28.073	11
12	14	(Italy) Andrea Caldarelli	Ocean Racing Technology	1:28.093	12
13	20	(Switzerland) Fabio Leimer	Rapax	1:28.143	13
14	15	(United Kingdom) Oliver Turvey	Ocean Racing Technology	1:28.151	14
15	6	(Mexico) Esteban Gutiérrez	Lotus ART	1:28.160	15
16	18	(Monaco) Stefano Coletti	Trident Racing	1:28.194	16
17	19	(Venezuela) Rodolfo González	Trident Racing	1:28.310	17
18	25	(United Kingdom) Max Chilton	Carlin	1:28.332	18
19	10	(Norway) Pål Varhaug	DAMS	1:28.357	19
20	23	(Spain) Dani Clos	Racing Engineering	1:28.373	20
21	7	(Malaysia) Fairuz Fauzy	Super Nova Racing	1:28.382	21
22	8	(Venezuela) Johnny Cecotto Jr.	Super Nova Racing	1:28.490	22
23	16	(France) Charles Pic	Barwa Addax Team	1:28.549	23
24	21	(Italy) Julián Leal	Rapax	1:28.644	24
25	22	(France) Nathanaël Berthon	Racing Engineering	1:28.646	25
26	22	(Italy) Luca Filippi	Scuderia Coloni	No Time	26

== Races ==
The first race was held over 170 km (110 mi) or 60 minutes (which ever came first) and all drivers were required by regulations to make one pit stop. The first ten finishers scored points, with two given to the fastest lap holder. The grid for the second race was determined by the finishing order of the first but the first eight drivers were in reverse order of where they finished. It was run for 120 km (75 mi) or 45 minutes (which ever came first) and, in contrast to the first race, drivers were not required to make pit stops. The top eight finishers earned points towards their respective championships.

=== Feature race ===
The first race began at 14:00 Central European Time (UTC+01:00) on 19 March. Grosjean made a fast start to maintain his lead on the run to the Variante Tamburello corner while van Der Garde had a brisk start to move from fifth to second whose attack for first was repelled by Grosjean. Bird was expected to be Grosjean's primary rival during the weekend but a slow start from him bunched up the field, causing Razia to run onto some grass. Razia spun straight into the tyre barrier and retired on the first lap. Van der Garde appeared to challenge Grosjean but the latter pulled away starting on lap four and van der Garde focused on holding off Herck. Bianchi had wheelspin leaving his grid slot and fell to fifth, separated by the Arden cars of Palmer and Král with whom he duelled for position. Palmer damaged his front wing entering Rivazza corner and Bianchi passed Král at the end of lap six when the latter picked up a front-right puncture forcing him to make his mandatory pit stop earlier than scheduled. On lap eight, Bird was trying to make up ground when he and his teammate Ericsson (who was returning to the track after sliding onto some grass) collided. The incident forced Bird out of the race. Grosjean retained first place after the mandatory pit stops to change tyres with van der Garde second and Bianchi overtook Herck for third.

Palmer and his teammate Král had problematic pit stops and dropped out of the top ten. Berthon was closing up to Turvey. when on lap 15 he came into contact with another car that blocked his attempt at overtaking and retired when he struck the barrier. Later on, Valsecchi made a driving error that put him off the track at Acque Minerali corner and Coletti took fifth from him. At the front, Grosjean increased his lead over van der Garde to 14.349 seconds and crossed the start/finish line after 35 scheduled laps to achieve his first victory of the season and his first in the GP2 Series since the 2009 Monaco round. Grosjean needed to finish fourth in the sprint race to win the Drivers' Championship. Bianchi could not get near van der Garde and came third with Herck, Coletti and Leimer in positions four to six. Clos gained 13 places from his starting position to finish seventh. Fauzy took eighth and the sprint race pole position after Valsecchi was disqualified due to his car failing a ride height test in post-race scrutineering. The final classified finishers were González, Ericsson, Gutiérrez, Král, Varhaug, Turvey, Cecotto, Leal, Caldarelli, Palmer, Aleshin, Pic, Chilton and Filippi.

==== Feature race classification ====
Drivers who scored championship points are denoted in bold.

Final feature race classification
Pos.	No.	Driver	Team	Laps	Time/Retired	Grid	Points
1	9	(France) **Romain Grosjean**	**DAMS**	35	52:59.103	1	11
2	17	(Netherlands) **Giedo van der Garde**	**Barwa Addax Team**	35	+14.349	5	8
3	5	(France) **Jules Bianchi**	**Lotus ART**	35	+17.527	4	6
4	11	(Romania) **Michael Herck**	**Scuderia Coloni**	35	+21.502	3	5
5	18	(Monaco) **Stefano Coletti**	**Trident Racing**	35	+41.228	16	4
6	20	(Switzerland) **Fabio Leimer**	**Rapax**	35	+51.867	13	3
7	23	(Spain) **Dani Clos**	**Racing Engineering**	35	+52.813	20	2
8	7	(Malaysia) **Fairuz Fauzy**	**Super Nova Racing**	35	+53.964	21	1
9	19	(Venezuela) Rodolfo González	Trident Racing	35	+54.224	17	
10	1	(Sweden) Marcus Ericsson	iSport International	35	+54.661	7	
11	6	(Mexico) Esteban Gutiérrez	Lotus ART	35	+55.390	15	
12	3	(Czech Republic) Josef Král	Arden International	35	+55.840	6	
13	10	(Norway) Pål Varhaug	DAMS	35	+1:07.700	19	
14	15	(United Kingdom) Oliver Turvey	Ocean Racing Technology	35	+1:19.721	14	
15	8	(Venezuela) Johnny Cecotto Jr.	Super Nova Racing	35	+1:20.567	22	
16	21	(Italy) Julián Leal	Rapax	35	+1:22.066	24	
17	14	(Italy) Andrea Caldarelli	Ocean Racing Technology	35	+1:24.224	12	
18	4	(United Kingdom) Jolyon Palmer	Arden International	35	+1:24.503	8	
19	27	(Russia) Mikhail Aleshin	Carlin	35	+1:26.672	10	
20	16	(France) Charles Pic	Barwa Addax Team	35	+1:29.215	23	
21	25	(United Kingdom) Max Chilton	Carlin	35	+1:31.023	18	
22	12	(Italy) Luca Filippi	Scuderia Coloni	35	+1:31.058	26	
Ret	22	(France) Nathanaël Berthon	Racing Engineering	15	Collision	25	
Ret	2	(United Kingdom) Sam Bird	iSport International	7	Collision	2	
Ret	26	(Brazil) Luiz Razia	Team AirAsia	0	Spin	11	
DSQ	27	(Italy) Davide Valsecchi	Team AirAsia	35	Disqualified^{1}	9	
Fastest lap: Romain Grosjean (DAMS) 1:28.097 (lap 32)

Notes

- **^1** — Davide Valsecchi was excluded from the feature race because the car failed a ride height test in post-race scrutineering.

=== Sprint race ===
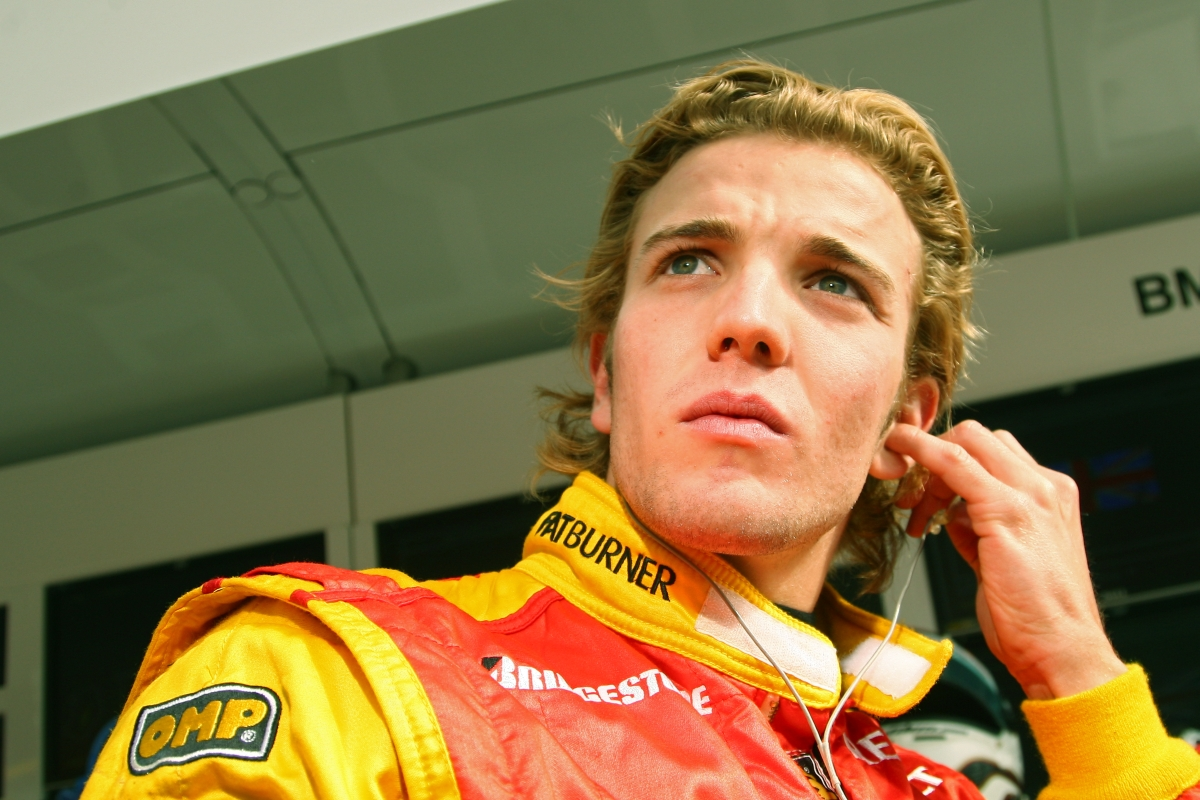
Dani Clos (pictured in 2010) won the sprint race by gaining the lead at the start and held it after withstanding pressure from Fabio Leimer.

The second event commenced on 20 March at 14:00 local time. Under sunny weather, Fauzy was slow to start and the fast starting Clos passed him for first into Variante Tamburello corner. Fauzy lost some ground and locked his tyres going into Variante Tamburello corner and caused a chain-reaction accident when he ran into the rear of Coletti's vehicle. This led to Coletti being unable to avoid clattering into Bianchi's rear wing. All three drivers retired and yellow flags were briefly waved in the area to warn others about the wreckage. Grosjean moved from eighth to fourth and Bianchi's retirement guaranteed Grosjean a second GP2 Series Drivers' Championship regardless of the final finishing order. The top four at this point were Clos, Leimer, van der Garde and Grosjean, who settled themselves into a rhythm and pulled away from the rest of the field. Ericsson passed Herck for seventh place but lost the place when he attacked González on the outside for fifth and made an error that put him off the course at Variante Tamburello turn on the fifth lap. The middle part of the race had no major action occurring since overtaking was difficult around the circuit. González struggled to keep heat in his rear tyres and his race ended early when his car developed a gearbox fault on lap 15.

Bird became the race's final retiree when Cecotto hit him and became stranded in the gravel trap at Variante Tambruello turn. In the closing laps, Grosjean was close by van der Garde in third due to his car's higher straight line speed but could not find a way past him. Grosjean then focused himself on Gutiérrez in fourth who sought to take an advantage of a potential error from him. Gutiérrez challenged Grosjean for fourth with two laps left by steering to the inside of him going into the Variante Alta chicane. Grosjean defended his line by cutting across the grass in the search for more room and Gutiérrez did the same. Leimer was close by race leader Clos throughout the duration of the race and challenged him several times but Clos responded each time to win by 0.931 seconds. Van der Garde completed the podium in third. Off the podium, Grosjean took fourth on the road with Gutiérrez and Herck fifth and sixth. After the race, Grosjean was penalised 20 seconds because the stewards deemed him to have gained an advantage by running off the track at the Variante Alta chicane and Cecotto was handed the same penalty for the incident with Bird. Following the application of penalties, the final classified finishers were Varhaug, Grosjean, Turvey, Král, Filippi, Pic, Caldarelli, Berthon, Razia, Chilton, Ericsson, Valsecchi, Leal, Cecotto and Aleshin.

==== Sprint race classification ====
Drivers who scored championship points are denoted in bold.

Final sprint race classification
Pos.	No.	Driver	Team	Laps	Time/Retired	Grid	Points
1	23	(Spain) **Dani Clos**	**Racing Engineering**	25	37:25.901	2	6
2	20	(Switzerland) **Fabio Leimer**	**Rapax**	25	+0.931	3	5
3	17	(Netherlands) **Giedo van der Garde**	**Barwa Addax Team**	25	+4.007	7	4
4	6	(Mexico) **Esteban Gutiérrez**	**Lotus ART**	25	+8.366	11	3
5	11	(Romania) **Michael Herck**	**Scuderia Coloni**	25	+15.312	5	2
6	10	(Norway) **Pål Varhaug**	**DAMS**	25	+27.415	13	1
7	9	(France) Romain Grosjean	DAMS	25	+27.826^{2}	8	1
8	15	(United Kingdom) Oliver Turvey	Ocean Racing Technology	25	+29.294	14	
9	3	(Czech Republic) Josef Král	Arden International	25	+29.721	12	
10	12	(Italy) Luca Filippi	Scuderia Coloni	25	+30.139	22	
11	16	(France) Charles Pic	Barwa Addax Team	25	+32.505	20	
12	14	(Italy) Andrea Caldarelli	Ocean Racing Technology	25	+36.006	17	
13	22	(France) Nathanaël Berthon	Racing Engineering	25	+36.893	23	
14	26	(Brazil) Luiz Razia	Team AirAsia	25	+38.998	25	
15	25	(United Kingdom) Max Chilton	Carlin	25	+39.815	21	
16	1	(Sweden) Marcus Ericsson	iSport International	25	+40.192	10	
17	27	(Italy) Davide Valsecchi	Team AirAsia	25	+42.100	26	
18	21	(Italy) Julián Leal	Rapax	25	+1:05.466	16	
19	8	(Venezuela) Johnny Cecotto Jr.	Super Nova Racing	25	+1:26.224	15^{3}	
20	24	(Russia) Mikhail Aleshin	Carlin	24	+1 Lap	19	
Ret	2	(United Kingdom) Sam Bird	iSport International	20	Collision	24	
Ret	19	(Venezuela) Rodolfo González	Trident Racing	14	Gearbox	9	
Ret	7	(Malaysia) Fairuz Fauzy	Super Nova Racing	0	Collision	1	
Ret	18	(Monaco) Stefano Coletti	Trident Racing	0	Collision	4	
Ret	5	(France) Jules Bianchi	Lotus ART	0	Collision	6	
Ret	4	(United Kingdom) Jolyon Palmer	Arden International	0	Mechanical	18	
Fastest lap: Romain Grosjean (DAMS) 1:28.772 (lap 8)

Notes

- **^2** — Romain Grosjean was penalised twenty seconds for failing to respect the track limits and gaining an advantage.
- **^3** — Johnny Cecotto Jr. was penalised twenty seconds for causing a collision with Sam Bird.

== Post-round ==
The top three drivers in both races appeared on the podium to collect their trophies and in separate press conferences. Although Grosjean did not have enough data to work with, he said he was pleased with the effort his team put into improving the car following practice, "We didn’t know how it was going. They did the right choice on the set up so I am very pleased and that gives me great confidence to keep pushing with the team." Van der Garde stated his belief his team found a solution to the poor starts he had in Abu Dhabi and that his pace was the same as Grosjean's, "We tried to be constant and I think in the end we are in a good place. We still have to improve the car. But this result today is definitely a good boost for the team and for me." Bianchi had mixed feelings because he was happy to finished third but was disappointed with his slow start, "I think it was not possible to win today because Romain was really quick, but we’ve improved our pace a lot compared to yesterday so we did a good job. Yes, Romain did the fastest lap but we were only one tenth behind. It’s not bad."

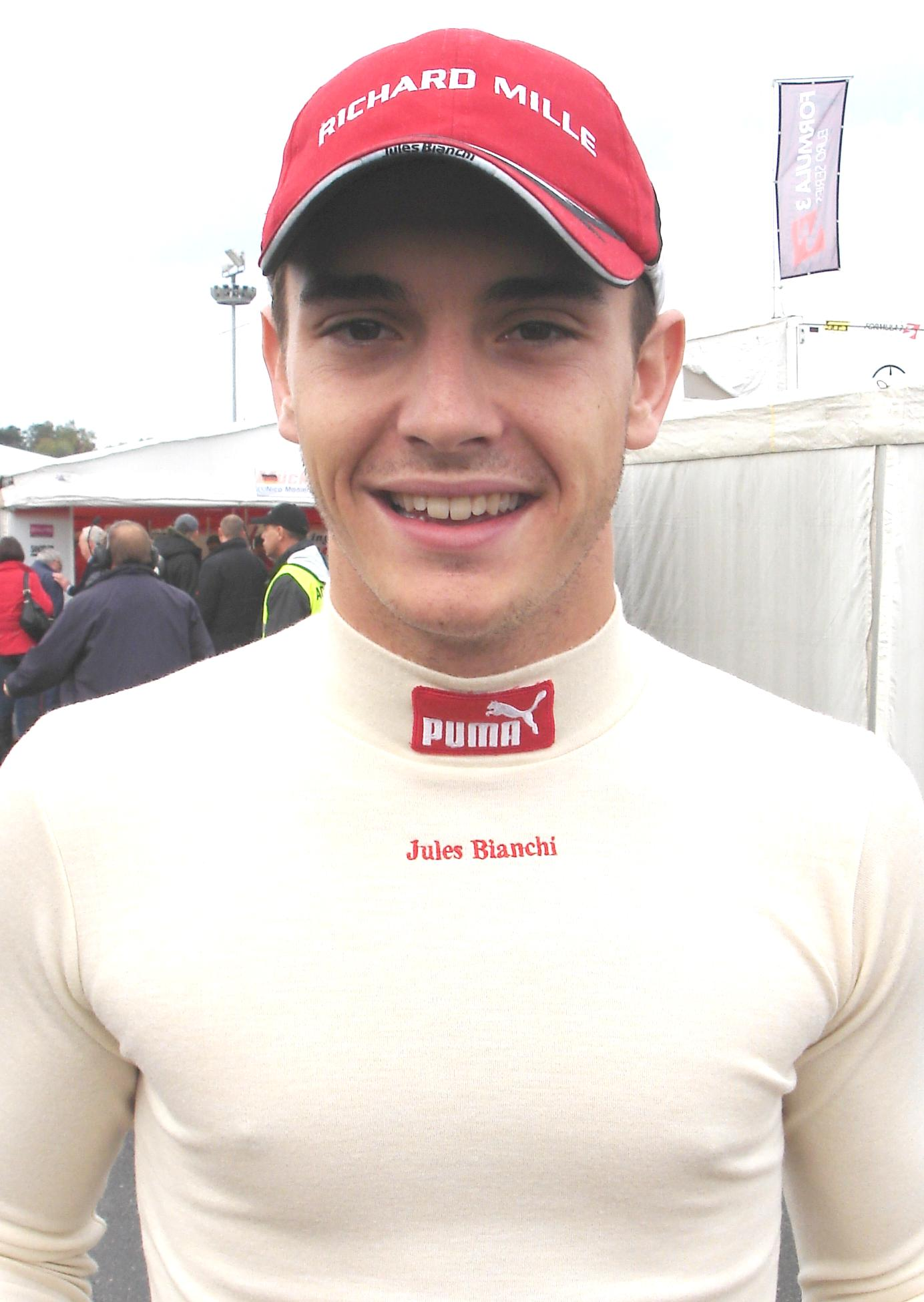
Jules Bianchi (pictured in 2009) finished second in the Drivers' Championship.

After the sprint race, Clos called his race "a positive day" after a sub-par performance in practice and qualifying and was positive since his team acquired more data throughout the race as preparation for the start of the main GP2 Series in May at Istanbul Park, "We were able to do a good race and start today from P2. I had a pretty good start today. And after that, the job was to be constant and to hold back Fabio. Nothing else... It’s really positive for me because I have not done much mileage on this car during the Asia Series." Leimer said he was overjoyed to finish second and believed he had slightly more pressure for the primary series than in 2010, "I am really happy because it’s been a while since my last podium. It was in Barcelona last race. In Abu Dhabi, it was also quite hard for me and now I am really happy that I can have a podium in the Asia Series for the team." Third-placed Van der Garde commented he struggled on the downhill section of the back straight due to a lack of outright pace but stated his satisfaction on returning to the podium, "It is nice of course to be in the Top three in the championship. But we have got another load of data today that we need to analyse and then I’m looking forward to the start of the main Series’ season."

Grosjean's championship success was his second in the GP2 Series since the 2008 GP2 Asia Series and the first for DAMS since Kamui Kobayashi won the 2008–09 GP2 Asia Series title. He said he was delighted with his success, "I'm over the moon with my second title. Once again I have to congratulate the whole team for doing a superb job after free practice, and I'd like to share this victory with them. It augurs well for the rest of the season in the main series. I can't wait for it to begin, and I'm convinced that we have every chance of winning another title." The general manager of DAMS Loïc David called the championship title "a great reward" and congratulated the team's achievement, "The dice fell in our favour in the second race, but on Saturday we'd already done was necessary to be in the best possible position. Congratulations too to Pal who opened his score in only his second meeting. Other battles now await us in GP2 and this result has given our confidence a major boost!"

Grosjean finished the season as the Drivers' Champion with 24 points. Bianchi, in second place, was six points behind and van der Garde's results in both races secured him third with 16 points. Coletti took fourth with 11 points and Leimer tied with Ericsson, Valescchi and Herck on points with nine but took fifth due to his second place in the second race. DAMS took the Teams' Championship with 25 points, three ahead of Lotus ART in second. Third was claimed by Barwa Addax with 16 points and fourth and fifth were Trident and iSport International with 11 points each.

== Standings after the race ==
Drivers' Championship standings

+/–	Pos.	Driver	Points
1	1	(France) Romain Grosjean	24
1	2	(France) Jules Bianchi	18
4	3	(Netherlands) Giedo van der Garde	16
2	4	(Monaco) Stefano Coletti	11
5	5	(Switzerland) Fabio Leimer	9

Teams' Championship standings

+/–	Pos.	Constructor	Points
2	1	(France) DAMS	25
1	2	(France) Lotus ART	22
4	3	(Spain) Barwa Addax Team	16
2	4	(Italy) Trident Racing	11
3	5	(United Kingdom) iSport International	11

- Note: Only the top five positions are included for both sets of standings.

Previous round: 2011 Abu Dhabi GP2 Asia round	GP2 Asia Series Championship; 2011 season	Next round: None
Previous round: 2006 San Marino GP2 Series round	Imola GP2 Asia round	Next round: 2022 Imola Formula 2 round
