= 2010 Monaco GP2 Series round =

Motor racing competition

2010 Monaco GP2 round
Round details
- Round 2 of 10 rounds in the 2010 GP2 Series
- Circuit de Monaco
- Location: Circuit de Monaco; Monte Carlo, Monaco
- Course: Street Course; 3.34 km (2.08 mi)

GP2 Series

Feature race
- Date: 14 May 2010
- Laps: 42

Pole position
Driver	(Spain) Dani Clos	Racing Engineering
- Time: 1:37.572

Podium
First	(Mexico) Sergio Pérez	Barwa Addax Team
Second	(Venezuela) Pastor Maldonado	Rapax
Third	(Spain) Dani Clos	Racing Engineering

Fastest lap
Driver	(Mexico) Sergio Pérez (Note: Sergio Pérez and Pastor Maldonado set the identical fastest laps (1:21.823), but Pérez made it earlier than Maldonado, so he was eligible to score point for the fastest lap.)	Barwa Addax Team
- Time: 1:21.823 (on lap 25)

Sprint race
- Date: 15 May 2010
- Laps: 30

Podium
First	(Belgium) Jérôme d'Ambrosio	DAMS
Second	(Netherlands) Giedo van der Garde	Barwa Addax Team
Third	(France) Jules Bianchi	ART Grand Prix

Fastest lap
Driver	(United Kingdom) Sam Bird	ART Grand Prix
- Time: 1:22.052 (on lap 6)

The 2010 Monaco GP2 round was a GP2 Series motor race held on May 14 and May 15, 2010 at the Circuit de Monaco in Monte Carlo, Monaco. It was the second race of the 2010 GP2 Season. The race was used to support the 2010 Monaco Grand Prix. GP2's feeder formula GP3 does not appear at this event, with Formula Renault 3.5 Series replacing it on the support bill.

== Report ==
=== Free practice ===
Pastor Maldonado was fastest in free practice. This circuit is favorite for the Venezuelan, he won here in 2006 Formula Renault 3.5 Series, 2007 and 2009 GP2 Series. Maldonado was ahead of Sergio Pérez and Christian Vietoris by 0.441 seconds. Vladimir Arabadzhiev missed his car in Saint Devote and crashed his left rear into the wall, later Max Chilton made same mistake at the same corner but he escaped on the track.

=== Qualifying ===
Dani Clos claimed the top spot in heavy rain conditions ahead of Sergio Pérez and practice’s fastest man Pastor Maldonado, who crashed into the wall four minutes before the end of the session. This pole was the first in Clos's GP2 career. Davide Valsecchi, who set seventh fastest time in qualifying got a five place grid penalty for his accident with Pastor Maldonado.

=== Feature Race ===
Sergio Pérez took his maiden GP2 race win in the feature race at Monaco. The Barwa Addax driver crossed the line 0.6s clear of Pastor Maldonado, although the margin did not reflect Pérez's dominance around the Monte Carlo streets. The Mexican had led by as much as 5.2s at some points of the race, although that was eroded by a safety car following a Ho-Pin Tung's heavy crash at the Swimming Pool on lap 16. Pérez stretched his lead back out to well over 2.0s after the restart, but while he backed off over the closing laps, he never allowed Maldonado to get close enough to attempt at a pass. The pair moved into the top two spots at the start after capitalising on a slow getaway by polesitter Dani Clos, although the Spaniard made up for it with a solid drive to third, giving him his third-straight point-scoring finish. ART's Jules Bianchi was fourth, the Frenchman making up a few spots with a well-timed pitstop, but he was forced to keep an eye on his mirrors due to some late-race pressure from Coloni's Alberto Valerio. It was a less fruitful morning for Bianchi's team-mate Sam Bird, who was on track for points until suffering a severe delay in the pits that dropped the Briton back in 15th. Giedo van der Garde was sixth after having early made one of the only passing moves of the race when he overtook DAMS' Jérôme d'Ambrosio, but the Belgian had the last laugh when he crossed the line in eighth behind Luiz Razia, giving himself pole for tomorrow's sprint race. In typical Monaco fashion there were a few drivers whose race ended at the first corner. Max Chilton removed himself from the race by sailing into the back of Davide Valsecchi, forcing Valsecchi into the pits for repairs to his rear wing, while Trident's Adrian Zaugg was also hit from behind and forced to retire. Valsecchi got back out, only to later tag the wall and bend his suspension, forcing him to park. Having already lost Chilton at the first corner, Ocean Racing had to wait just one more lap before it could begin packing up after Fabio Leimer crashed at Mirabeau, and Coloni's Vladimir Arabadzhiev was also forced to retire with accident damage after a brush with the tyres.

=== Sprint Race ===
Jérôme d'Ambrosio repeated Sergio Pérez's earlier feat by winning his first GP2 race in the Sprint Race at Monaco. The Renault Junior Team driver led all the way from pole, but his early efforts to build a lead were dashed when Coloni's Alberto Valerio and Arden's Rodolfo González crashed simultaneously at different parts of the circuit and prompted a safety car. That brought D'Ambrosio back within range of Giedo van der Garde, and he had the Addax car in his mirrors for virtually the rest of the race, finally crossing the line just 0.3 seconds clear. There was a lot of scrapping behind them for third place, which eventually went to ART's Jules Bianchi after a determined drive and a couple of brave passing moves. Rapax's Luiz Razia had been on target for the final podium place for most of the race, but after seeing off an early challenge from Valerio (which ended with Valerio hitting the wall at the chicane), he soon found himself under pressure from Bianchi. The Frenchman eventually found a way past, while Razia lost another spot when he made a mistake on the penultimate lap and allowed Trident's Johnny Cecotto to slip past into fourth. Race 1 winner Sergio Pérez took the final point for sixth. Much like the Grand Prix would be, the race had many incidents, starting with Dani Clos ripping a wheel off on the barriers on lap nine and ending Racing Engineering's interest in the afternoon, with Christian Vietoris having failed to make the start due to an engine problem. There was also a number of drivethrough penalties, with the victims including Pastor Maldonado and Rodriguez for a jump start and Oliver Turvey, Davide Valsecchi, and Fabio Leimer for cutting the first corner at the start. Sam Bird got the point for fastest lap.

== Classification ==
=== Qualifying ===
Pos	No	Driver	Team	Time	Gap	Grid
1	7	(Spain) Dani Clos	Racing Engineering	1:37.572		1
2	4	(Mexico) Sergio Pérez	Barwa Addax Team	1:37.605	+0.033	2
3	15	(Venezuela) Pastor Maldonado	Rapax	1:38.512	+0.940	3
4	20	(Brazil) Alberto Valerio	Scuderia Coloni	1:38.901	+1.329	4
5	19	(Switzerland) Fabio Leimer	Ocean Racing Technology	1:39.072	+1.500	5
6	1	(France) Jules Bianchi	ART Grand Prix	1:39.146	+1.574	6
7	10	(Italy) Davide Valsecchi	iSport International	1:39.255	+1.683	12^{1}
8	11	(Belgium) Jérôme d'Ambrosio	DAMS	1:39.363	+1.791	7
9	8	(Germany) Christian Vietoris	Racing Engineering	1:39.413	+1.841	8
10	14	(Brazil) Luiz Razia	Rapax	1:39.544	+1.972	9
11	2	(United Kingdom) Sam Bird	ART Grand Prix	1:39.638	+2.066	10
12	3	(Netherlands) Giedo van der Garde	Barwa Addax Team	1:39.812	+2.240	11
13	6	(Sweden) Marcus Ericsson	Super Nova Racing	1:39.826	+2.254	13
14	12	(China) Ho-Pin Tung	DAMS	1:39.926	+2.354	14
15	25	(South Africa) Adrian Zaugg	Trident Racing	1:40.237	+2.665	15
16	18	(United Kingdom) Max Chilton	Ocean Racing Technology	1:40.495	+2.923	16
17	27	(Italy) Giacomo Ricci	DPR	1:40.520	+2.948	17
18	16	(France) Charles Pic	Arden International	1:40.767	+3.195	18
19	17	(Venezuela) Rodolfo González	Arden International	1:40.881	+3.309	19
20	5	(Czech Republic) Josef Král	Super Nova Racing	1:40.973	+3.401	20
21	21	(Bulgaria) Vladimir Arabadzhiev	Scuderia Coloni	1:41.733	+4.161	21
22	26	(Romania) Michael Herck	DPR	1:42.039	+4.467	22
23	24	(Venezuela) Johnny Cecotto Jr.	Trident Racing	1:43.090	+5.518	23
24	9	(United Kingdom) Oliver Turvey	iSport International	1:43.595	+6.023	24

Notes

- ^1 — Davide Valsecchi received a five-place grid penalty because of causing accident with Pastor Maldonado in qualifying.

=== Feature Race ===
Pos	No	Driver	Team	Laps	Time/Retired	Grid	Points
1	4	(Mexico) Sergio Pérez	Barwa Addax Team	42	1:00:32.223	2	10+1
2	15	(Venezuela) Pastor Maldonado	Rapax	42	+0.617	3	8
3	7	(Spain) Dani Clos	Racing Engineering	42	+10.688	1	6+2
4	1	(France) Jules Bianchi	ART Grand Prix	42	+12.117	6	5
5	20	(Brazil) Alberto Valerio	Scuderia Coloni	42	+14.117	4	4
6	3	(Netherlands) Giedo van der Garde	Barwa Addax Team	42	+17.337	11	3
7	14	(Brazil) Luiz Razia	Rapax	42	+35.967	9	2
8	11	(Belgium) Jérôme d'Ambrosio	DAMS	42	+37.403	7	1
9	24	(Venezuela) Johnny Cecotto Jr.	Trident Racing	42	+46.535	23	
10	17	(Venezuela) Rodolfo González	Arden International	42	+53.055	19	
11	16	(France) Charles Pic	Arden International	42	+53.977	18	
12	6	(Sweden) Marcus Ericsson	Super Nova Racing	42	+54.913	13	
13	5	(Czech Republic) Josef Král	Super Nova Racing	42	+57.571	20	
14	8	(Germany) Christian Vietoris	Racing Engineering	42	+58.636	PL^{2}	
15	9	(United Kingdom) Oliver Turvey	iSport International	42	+59.942	24	
16	26	(Romania) Michael Herck	DPR	42	+1:03.008	22	
17	27	(Italy) Giacomo Ricci	DPR	42	+1:03.419	17	
18	2	(United Kingdom) Sam Bird	ART Grand Prix	42	+1:24.160^{3}	10	
Ret	10	(Italy) Davide Valsecchi	iSport International	21	Crash	12	
Ret	21	(Bulgaria) Vladimir Arabadzhiev	Scuderia Coloni	19	Crash	21	
Ret	12	(China) Ho-Pin Tung	DAMS	13	Crash	14	
Ret	19	(Switzerland) Fabio Leimer	Ocean Racing Technology	0	Collision	5	
Ret	25	(South Africa) Adrian Zaugg	Trident Racing	0	Collision	15	
Ret	18	(United Kingdom) Max Chilton	Ocean Racing Technology	0	Collision	16	

Notes

- ^2 — Christian Vietoris started from the pit lane after her car got stuck on the starting grid at the start of the formation lap.
- ^3 — Sam Bird received a 25-seconds penalty because of cutting the chicane.

=== Sprint Race ===
Pos	No	Driver	Team	Laps	Time/Retired	Grid	Points
1	11	(Belgium) Jérôme d'Ambrosio	DAMS	30	43:43.804	1	6
2	3	(Netherlands) Giedo van der Garde	Barwa Addax Team	30	+0.351	3	5
3	1	(France) Jules Bianchi	ART Grand Prix	30	+1.078	5	4
4	24	(Venezuela) Johnny Cecotto Jr.	Trident Racing	30	+2.919	9	3
5	14	(Brazil) Luiz Razia	Rapax	30	+6.572	2	2
6	4	(Mexico) Sergio Pérez	Barwa Addax Team	30	+7.257	8	1
7	16	(France) Charles Pic	Arden International	30	+7.903	11	
8	5	(Czech Republic) Josef Král	Super Nova Racing	30	+8.837	13	
9	6	(Sweden) Marcus Ericsson	Super Nova Racing	30	+9.431	12	
10	2	(United Kingdom) Sam Bird	ART Grand Prix	30	+10.046	18	1
11	15	(Venezuela) Pastor Maldonado	Rapax	30	+10.465	7	
12	25	(South Africa) Adrian Zaugg	Trident Racing	30	+11.239	23	
13	21	(Bulgaria) Vladimir Arabadzhiev	Scuderia Coloni	30	+12.591	20	
14	18	(United Kingdom) Max Chilton	Ocean Racing Technology	30	+25.246	24	
15	9	(United Kingdom) Oliver Turvey	iSport International	30	+25.461	15	
16	10	(Italy) Davide Valsecchi	iSport International	30	+25.703	19	
17	19	(Switzerland) Fabio Leimer	Ocean Racing Technology	30	+26.063	22	
Ret	26	(Romania) Michael Herck	DPR	22	Retired	16	
Ret	12	(China) Ho-Pin Tung	DAMS	20	Retired	21	
Ret	27	(Italy) Giacomo Ricci	DPR	17	Retired	17	
Ret	20	(Brazil) Alberto Valerio	Scuderia Coloni	14	Crash	4	
Ret	17	(Venezuela) Rodolfo González	Arden International	14	Crash	10	
Ret	7	(Spain) Dani Clos	Racing Engineering	8	Crash/Lost wheel	6	
DNS	8	(Germany) Christian Vietoris	Racing Engineering	0	Did not start^{4}	14	

Notes

- ^4 — Christian Vietoris did not start due to engine problems.

== Standings after the round ==
Drivers' Championship standings

	Pos	Driver	Points
7	1	(Mexico) Sergio Pérez	17
3	2	(Venezuela) Pastor Maldonado	15
2	3	(Spain) Dani Clos	15
	4	(Brazil) Luiz Razia	11
5	5	(France) Jules Bianchi	11

Teams' Championship standings

	Pos	Team	Points
	1	(Italy) Rapax	26
6	2	(Spain) Barwa Addax Team	25
3	3	(France) ART Grand Prix	16
1	4	(Spain) Racing Engineering	15
3	5	(United Kingdom) Arden International	10

- Note: Only the top five positions are included for both sets of standings.

== Notes ==
Previous round: 2010 Catalunya GP2 Series round	GP2 Series; 2010 season	Next round: 2010 Istanbul Park GP2 Series round
Previous round: 2009 Monaco GP2 Series round	Monaco GP2 Series round	Next round: 2011 Monaco GP2 Series round
