= Rapax Team =

Motor racing team

(Italy) Rapax
- Founded: 2010
- Founder(s): Gianfranco Sovernigo; Valter Sovernigo
- Folded: 2017
- Base: Veggiano, Padua, Italy
- Team principal(s): Gianfranco Sovernigo; Andrea Bergamini
- Former series: FIA Formula 2 Championship; GP2 Series; GP2 Asia Series
- Noted drivers: (Monaco) Stefano Coletti (Russia) Sergey Sirotkin (Netherlands) Nyck de Vries
- Teams' Championships: GP2 Series: 2010
- Drivers' Championships: GP2 Series: 2010: Pastor Maldonado
- Website: http://www.rapaxteam.com/

Rapax Team was an Italian motor racing team. The team's history can be traced back to when the GP Racing team was founded in 1997, and also to when Piquet Sports was created in 2000 by triple world champion Nelson Piquet. In 2007, Piquet Sports and GP Racing merged to create "Minardi Piquet Sports". In 2008, the team dropped "Minardi" from their name. In early 2009, the team was sold and rebranded as Piquet GP, but changed its name again in November to Rapax Team, once all remaining ties to part-owner Piquet were cut.

== History ==
During 2009, the team was sold and all remaining ties with part-owner Nelson Piquet were severed. The team was rebranded "Rapax" (Latin for "predator") at the beginning of 2010, after the Legio XXI Rapax Roman legion. Pastor Maldonado rejoined the team, alongside Luiz Razia. Maldonado won six races on his way to the drivers' championship, and Razia backed him up with 11th place overall, allowing Rapax to win the teams' championship for the first time, and in the first year of its new identity.

For 2011, Maldonado graduated to Formula One with the Williams team and Razia moved to the new Caterham Team AirAsia; Rapax signed Fabio Leimer and Julián Leal to replace them. Leimer won a single race but was unable build on it, restricting him to fourteenth place in the drivers' championship, whilst Leal did not score at all; Rapax dropped to tenth in the teams' championship.

In 2012, the team improved to ninth overall through the combined efforts of Tom Dillmann, Stefano Coletti, Ricardo Teixeira and Daniël de Jong. Dillmann was the most successful with a single victory, but was dropped for budgetary reasons mid-season and replaced by De Jong. De Jong's Auto GP racing commitments also resulted in him missing the final two races of the championship, for which he was replaced by Scuderia Coloni refugee Coletti. By contrast, Teixeira competed in all but one round of the season, but failed to score any points.

For 2013 the team kept Coletti and signed with Simon Trummer. Coletti took three race wins and improved to the fifth place in the standings. While Trummer had six point-scoring finishes on his way to the 20th place in the driver standings.

Trummer was retained for the 2014 GP2 Series. He was joined by Adrian Quaife-Hobbs. The team had suffered a weak season, with just one podium that Quaife-Hobbs had collected.

The team had completely changed their line-up for the 2015 GP2 Series, signing with Sergey Sirotkin and Robert Vișoiu. The team had scored its first win since 2013 Monaco round with Sirotkin in the 2015 Silverstone round. Sirotkin was also the first Rapax driver since Maldonado who had finished in the top-three in the driver standings with the team. For the last two rounds of the season Visoiu was replaced by Gustav Malja.

Malja remained with the team for the full 2016 GP2 Series campaign. Arthur Pic completed the team line-up. Malja had podiums at Spa and Monza, while Pic finished on podium at Hockenheimring. Pic was replaced by Johnny Cecotto Jr. in the two final rounds. Rapax ended ninth in the team standings.

In 2017, the GP2 Series was rebranded to FIA Formula 2 Championship. The team had started the season with Cecotto and Nyck de Vries. De Vries won the Sprint Monaco F2 race — the first race win for the Rapax since Sirotkin in 2015. At Spielberg Cecotto was replaced by Sergio Canamasas. Rapax field two new drivers at Spa, signing with Louis Delétraz and Roberto Merhi. René Binder had a one-off round appearance for Rapax at Jerez. Despite not having a permanent driver line-up, results shown by De Vries helped the team to achieve fifth place in the teams standings — the highest position since they took the teams' championship back in 2010. But the team decided to stop their racing activity and leave the FIA Formula 2 Championship.

== Results ==
=== GP2 Series ===
Year	Car	Drivers	Races	Wins	Poles	Fast laps	Points	D.C.	T.C.
2010	Dallara GP2/08-Mecachrome	(Venezuela) Pastor Maldonado	20	6	0	5	87	**1st**	**1st**
2010	Dallara GP2/08-Mecachrome	(Brazil) Luiz Razia	20	0	0	1	28	11th	**1st**
2011	Dallara GP2/11-Mecachrome	(Switzerland) Fabio Leimer	18	1	0	1	15	14th	10th
2011	Dallara GP2/11-Mecachrome	(Colombia) Julián Leal	18	0	0	0	0	27th	10th
2012	Dallara GP2/11-Mecachrome	(Monaco) Stefano Coletti	22	0	0	2	50	13th†	9th
2012	Dallara GP2/11-Mecachrome	(France) Tom Dillmann	14	1	0	0	29	15th	9th
2012	Dallara GP2/11-Mecachrome	(Netherlands) Daniël de Jong	8	0	0	0	0	26th	9th
2012	Dallara GP2/11-Mecachrome	(Portugal) Ricardo Teixeira	22	0	0	0	0	29th	9th
2013	Dallara GP2/11-Mecachrome	(Monaco) Stefano Coletti	22	3	1	5	135	5th	7th
2013	Dallara GP2/11-Mecachrome	(Switzerland) Simon Trummer	22	0	0	0	20	21st	7th
2014	Dallara GP2/11-Mecachrome	(United Kingdom) Adrian Quaife-Hobbs	22	0	0	0	30	13th	9th
2014	Dallara GP2/11-Mecachrome	(Switzerland) Simon Trummer	22	0	0	0	26	17th	9th
2015	Dallara GP2/11-Mecachrome	(Russia) Sergey Sirotkin	21	1	1	1	139	**3rd**	6th
2015	Dallara GP2/11-Mecachrome	(Romania) Robert Vișoiu	18	0	0	0	20	17th	6th
2015	Dallara GP2/11-Mecachrome	(Sweden) Gustav Malja	3	0	0	0	1	25th‡	6th
2016	Dallara GP2/11-Mecachrome	(Sweden) Gustav Malja	22	0	0	0	53	13th	9th
2016	Dallara GP2/11-Mecachrome	(France) Arthur Pic	18	0	0	0	36	14th	9th
2016	Dallara GP2/11-Mecachrome	(Venezuela) Johnny Cecotto Jr.	4	0	0	0	18	18th	9th

† Includes points scored for Scuderia Coloni.
‡ Includes points scored for Trident Racing.

=== FIA Formula 2 Championship ===
Year	Car	Drivers	Races	Wins	Poles	Fast laps	Points	D.C.	T.C.
2017	Dallara GP2/11-Mecachrome	(Netherlands) Nyck de Vries	22	1	0	2	114	7th†	5th
2017	Dallara GP2/11-Mecachrome	(Spain) Sergio Canamasas	14	0	0	0	21	14th†	5th
2017	Dallara GP2/11-Mecachrome	(Venezuela) Johnny Cecotto Jr.	8	0	0	0	16	16th	5th
2017	Dallara GP2/11-Mecachrome	(Switzerland) Louis Delétraz	22	0	0	0	16	17th†	5th
2017	Dallara GP2/11-Mecachrome	(Spain) Roberto Merhi	8	0	0	0	16	18th†	5th
2017	Dallara GP2/11-Mecachrome	(Austria) René Binder	2	0	0	0	0	28th	5th

† Shared his position and results with another team.

=== GP2 Series ===
(key) (Races in bold indicate pole position) (Races in italics indicate fastest lap)

Year	Chassis Engine Tyres	Drivers	1	2	3	4	5	6	7	8	9	10	11	12	13	14	15	16	17	18	19	20	21	22	23	24	T.C.	Points
2010	GP2/08; Mecachrome; **B**		CAT; FEA	CAT; SPR	MON; FEA	MON; SPR	IST; FEA	IST; SPR	VAL; FEA	VAL; SPR	SIL; FEA	SIL; SPR	HOC; FEA	HOC; SPR	HUN; FEA	HUN; SPR	SPA; FEA	SPA; SPR	MNZ; FEA	MNZ; SPR	YMC; FEA	YMC; SPR					1st	115
2010	GP2/08; Mecachrome; **B**	(Brazil) Luiz Razia	7	2	7	5	5	2	Ret	Ret	Ret	15	Ret	13	10	Ret	16	10	Ret	10	7	2					1st	115
2010	GP2/08; Mecachrome; **B**	(Venezuela) Pastor Maldonado	6	3	2	11	1	6	1	4	1	4	1	20†	1	DSQ	1	Ret	Ret	Ret	17	9					1st	115
2011	GP2/11; Mecachrome; **P**		IST; FEA	IST; SPR	CAT; FEA	CAT; SPR	MON; FEA	MON; SPR	VAL; FEA	VAL; SPR	SIL; FEA	SIL; SPR	NÜR; FEA	NÜR; SPR	HUN; FEA	HUN; SPR	SPA; FEA	SPA; SPR	MNZ; FEA	MNZ; SPR							10th	15
2011	GP2/11; Mecachrome; **P**	(Switzerland) Fabio Leimer	Ret	20	8	1	9	7	Ret	14	15	11	DSQ	8	11	11	Ret	Ret	7	2							10th	15
2011	GP2/11; Mecachrome; **P**	(Colombia) Julián Leal	19	Ret	17	14	Ret	Ret	11	9	22	21	14	9	20	Ret	Ret	Ret	16	Ret							10th	15
2012	GP2/11; Mecachrome; **P**		SEP; FEA	SEP; SPR	BHR1; FEA	BHR1; SPR	BHR2; FEA	BHR2; SPR	CAT; FEA	CAT; SPR	MON; FEA	MON; SPR	VAL; FEA	VAL; SPR	SIL; FEA	SIL; SPR	HOC; FEA	HOC; SPR	HUN; FEA	HUN; SPR	SPA; FEA	SPA; SPR	MNZ; FEA	MNZ; SPR	MRN; FEA	MRN; SPR	9th	44
2012	GP2/11; Mecachrome; **P**	(Portugal) Ricardo Teixeira	21	24	17	13	23	20	Ret	23	20	Ret			18	15	DSQ	16	19	20	18	15	20	18	17	21	9th	44
2012	GP2/11; Mecachrome; **P**	(France) Tom Dillmann	18	11	6	10	8	1	22	12	11	Ret	Ret	12			9	Ret									9th	44
2012	GP2/11; Mecachrome; **P**	(Netherlands) Daniël de Jong											16	9	Ret	13			15	19	13	11					9th	44
2012	GP2/11; Mecachrome; **P**	(Monaco) Stefano Coletti																					8	4	13	8	9th	44
2013	GP2/11; Mecachrome; **P**		SEP; FEA	SEP; SPR	BHR; FEA	BHR; SPR	CAT; FEA	CAT; SPR	MON; FEA	MON; SPR	SIL; FEA	SIL; SPR	NÜR; FEA	NÜR; SPR	HUN; FEA	HUN; SPR	SPA; FEA	SPA; SPR	MNZ; FEA	MNZ; SPR	MRN; FEA	MRN; SPR	YMC; FEA	YMC; SPR			7th	155
2013	GP2/11; Mecachrome; **P**	(Monaco) Stefano Coletti	**3**	1	2	3	4	1	6	1	21†	10	3	19	16	20†	13	23	Ret	13	12	24	20†	9			7th	155
2013	GP2/11; Mecachrome; **P**	(Switzerland) Simon Trummer	9	6	9	14	19	16	13	23	24	16	14	9	6	7	12	11	Ret	16	16	13	13	7			7th	155
2014	GP2/11; Mecachrome; **P**		BHR; FEA	BHR; SPR	CAT; FEA	CAT; SPR	MON; FEA	MON; SPR	RBR; FEA	RBR; SPR	SIL; FEA	SIL; SPR	HOC; FEA	HOC; SPR	HUN; FEA	HUN; SPR	SPA; FEA	SPA; SPR	MNZ; FEA	MNZ; SPR	SOC; FEA	SOC; SPR	YMC; FEA	YMC; SPR			9th	56
2014	GP2/11; Mecachrome; **P**	(United Kingdom) Adrian Quaife-Hobbs	10	6	9	9	9	8	24	18	13	15	14	8	2	12	11	21	11	8							9th	56
2014	GP2/11; Mecachrome; **P**	(Cyprus) Tio Ellinas																			21	14					9th	56
2014	GP2/11; Mecachrome; **P**	(Italy) Kevin Giovesi																					19	20			9th	56
2014	GP2/11; Mecachrome; **P**	(Switzerland) Simon Trummer	7	2	12	Ret	Ret	18	20	20	25	18	6	14	11	13	18	17	19	11	15	21	17	16			9th	56
2015	GP2/11; Mecachrome; **P**		BHR; FEA	BHR; SPR	CAT; FEA	CAT; SPR	MON; FEA	MON; SPR	RBR; FEA	RBR; SPR	SIL; FEA	SIL; SPR	HUN; FEA	HUN; SPR	SPA; FEA	SPA; SPR	MNZ; FEA	MNZ; SPR	SOC; FEA	SOC; SPR	BHR; FEA	BHR; SPR	YMC; FEA	YMC; SPR			6th	159
2015	GP2/11; Mecachrome; **P**	(Russia) Sergey Sirotkin	12	14	16	10	5	3	2	4	**1**	8	3	3	9	6	Ret	5	4	21	5	4	13	C			6th	159
2015	GP2/11; Mecachrome; **P**	(Romania) Robert Vișoiu	5	7	18	23	15	13	11	9	12	11	9	7	15	16	9	Ret	17	18							6th	159
2015	GP2/11; Mecachrome; **P**	(Sweden) Gustav Malja																			16	13	16	C			6th	159
2016	GP2/11; Mecachrome; **P**		CAT; FEA	CAT; SPR	MON; FEA	MON; SPR	BAK; FEA	BAK; SPR	RBR; FEA	RBR; SPR	SIL; FEA	SIL; SPR	HUN; FEA	HUN; SPR	HOC; FEA	HOC; SPR	SPA; FEA	SPA; SPR	MNZ; FEA	MNZ; SPR	SEP; FEA	SEP; SPR	YMC; FEA	YMC; SPR			9th	107
2016	GP2/11; Mecachrome; **P**	(Sweden) Gustav Malja	9	10	14	12	10	Ret	13	16	22	19	13	14	6	8	8	2	3	7	9	5	Ret	14			9th	107
2016	GP2/11; Mecachrome; **P**	(France) Arthur Pic	13	Ret	10	9	Ret	8	9	18	14	11	5	Ret	4	3	14	22†	Ret	11							9th	107
2016	GP2/11; Mecachrome; **P**	(Venezuela) Johnny Cecotto Jr.																			13	9	7	2			9th	107

=== GP2 Final ===
(key) (Races in bold indicate pole position) (Races in italics indicate fastest lap)

Year	Chassis Engine Tyres	Drivers	1	2	T.C.	Points
2011	GP2/11; Mecachrome; **P**		YMC; FEA	YMC; SPR	8th	0
2011	GP2/11; Mecachrome; **P**	(Spain) Dani Clos	Ret	9	8th	0
2011	GP2/11; Mecachrome; **P**	(Romania) Mihai Marinescu	17	Ret	8th	0

=== GP2 Asia Series ===
(key) (Races in bold indicate pole position) (Races in italics indicate fastest lap)

Year	Chassis Engine Tyres	Drivers	1	2	3	4	5	6	7	8	T.C.	Points
2009–10	GP2/05; Renault; **B**		YMC1; FEA	YMC1; SPR	YMC2; FEA	YMC2; SPR	BHR1; FEA	BHR1; SPR	BHR2; FEA	BHR2; SPR	12th	0
2009–10	GP2/05; Renault; **B**	(Bulgaria) Vladimir Arabadzhiev			13	10	17	7	12	9	12th	0
2009–10	GP2/05; Renault; **B**	(Italy) Daniel Zampieri			Ret	15	11	8			12th	0
2009–10	GP2/05; Renault; **B**	(Brazil) Luiz Razia							Ret	13	12th	0
2011	GP2/11; Mecachrome; **P**		YMC; FEA	YMC; SPR	IMO; FEA	IMO; SPR					8th	9
2011	GP2/11; Mecachrome; **P**	(Switzerland) Fabio Leimer	10	6	6	2					8th	9
2011	GP2/11; Mecachrome; **P**	(Italy) Julián Leal	Ret	17	16	18					8th	9

=== FIA Formula 2 Championship ===
(key) (Races in bold indicate pole position) (Races in italics indicate fastest lap)

Year	Chassis Engine Tyres	Drivers	1	2	3	4	5	6	7	8	9	10	11	12	13	14	15	16	17	18	19	20	21	22	T.C.	Points
2017	GP2/11; Mecachrome; **P**		BHR; FEA	BHR; SPR	CAT; FEA	CAT; SPR	MON; FEA	MON; SPR	BAK; FEA	BAK; SPR	RBR; FEA	RBR; SPR	SIL; FEA	SIL; SPR	HUN; FEA	HUN; SPR	SPA; FEA	SPA; SPR	MNZ; FEA	MNZ; SPR	JER; FEA	JER; SPR	YMC; FEA	YMC; SPR	5th	137
2017	GP2/11; Mecachrome; **P**	(Netherlands) Nyck de Vries	10	6	10	Ret	7	1	2	Ret	13	16†	DNS	7	3	3									5th	137
2017	GP2/11; Mecachrome; **P**	(Switzerland) Louis Delétraz															14	12	7	4	17	12	10	Ret	5th	137
2017	GP2/11; Mecachrome; **P**	(Venezuela) Johnny Cecotto Jr.	15	9	17	10	8	2	Ret	14															5th	137
2017	GP2/11; Mecachrome; **P**	(Spain) Sergio Canamasas									15	9	5	4	Ret	Ret									5th	137
2017	GP2/11; Mecachrome; **P**	(Spain) Roberto Merhi															7	6	11	5			16	10	5th	137
2017	GP2/11; Mecachrome; **P**	(Austria) René Binder																			15	17			5th	137

== Notes and references ==
Achievements
Preceded by ART Grand Prix	GP2 Series Teams' Champion; 2010	Succeeded by Addax Team
