= Dani Clos =

Spanish YouTuber and former racing driver (b. 1988)

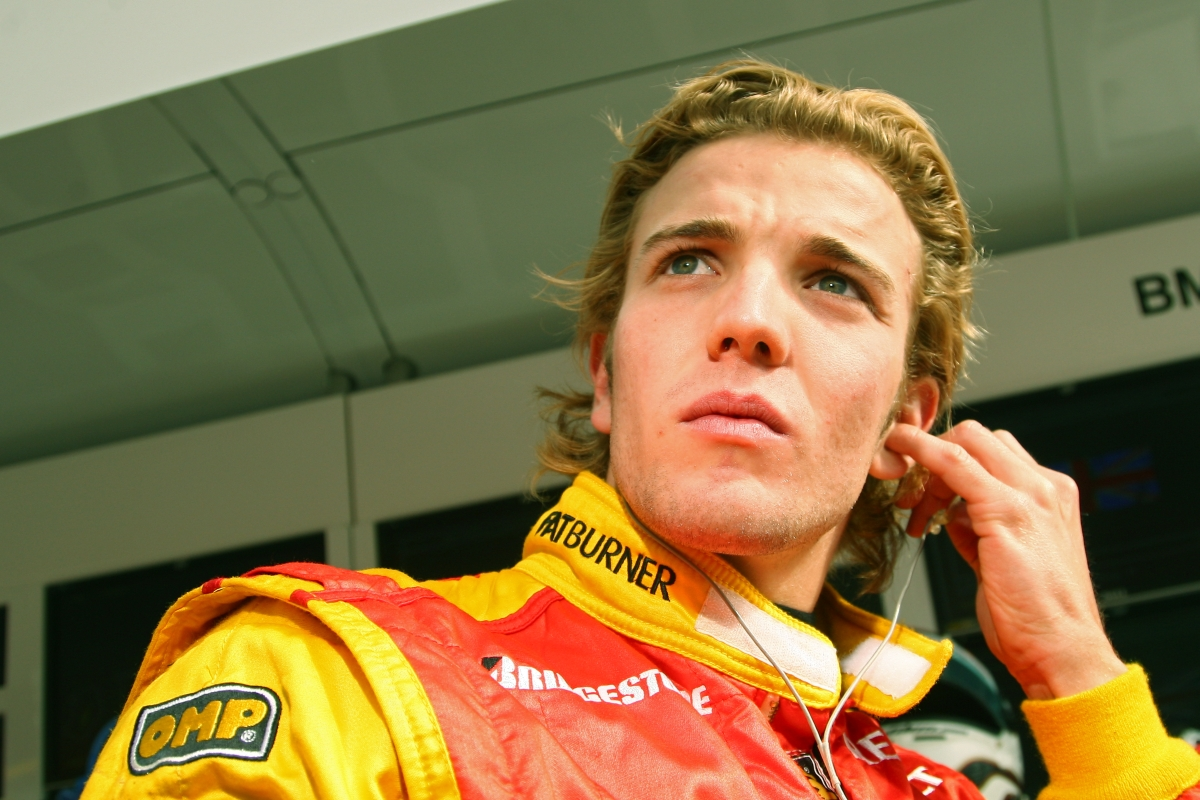
- Clos in 2010
- Nationality: Spanish
- Born: Daniel Clos Álvarez; 23 October 1988 (age 38) Barcelona, Spain

GP2 Series career
- Debut season: 2009
- Current team: Barwa Addax Team
- Categorisation: FIA Platinum (until 2017); FIA Gold (2018–)
- Car number: 2
- Former teams: Racing Engineering
- Starts: 61
- Wins: 1
- Podiums: 9
- Poles: 1
- Fastest laps: 2
- Best finish: 4th in 2010

Previous series
- 2009–10-2011 2009 2007–08 2005–06 2005–06 2004: GP2 Asia Series; Formula Renault 3.5 Series; Formula Three Euroseries; Eurocup Formula Renault 2.0; Formula Renault 2.0 Italia; Formula Junior 1600 Spain

Championship titles
- 2006: Formula Renault 2.0 Italia

Daniel Clos Álvarez (born 23 October 1988) is a Spanish former professional racecar driver and YouTuber. In 2012, he was the test driver for the now defunct HRT Formula One team.

== Career ==
=== Karting ===
Born in Barcelona, Clos competed at the ICA Junior level of karting. His first win was at the Catalan district of the Spanish ICA Junior Championship in 2001. In 2002 Clos won the Copa Campeones Trophy and finished tenth in the overall season standings for the Italian Open Masters. The 2002 season included several drivers who would go onto notable success such as Nico Hülkenberg, Sébastien Buemi, Nelson Panciatici, Oliver Oakes and Buemi's cousin, Natacha Gachnang.

By far and away Clos' best year of karting was 2003. Equipped with an MGM Racing Birel, he won both the prestigious Andrea Margutti Trophy, beating Miguel Molina and Jules Bianchi to the flag, as well as the Spanish ICA Junior Championship. He also placed sixth in the Italian Open Masters and 11th in the European Championship. In 2004 Clos moved up to Formula A, but he decided to dovetail it with a campaign in the Formula Junior 1600 series in Spain. He would finish 36th in the Formula A European Championship, with a solitary point. He called time on his karting career after a 30th place in the 2005 Margutti Trophy.

=== Formula Junior 1600 Spain ===
Clos made the move into single-seaters in 2004, with a campaign in the Formula Junior 1600 championship. Clos adapted to the cars very well, and ended up a solid fourth place in the championship behind Michael Herck, Marco Barba and Arturo Llobell, with one win and four podiums along the way.

=== Formula Renault 2.0 ===
After just one season racing at 1600cc Formula Renault level, Clos moved up to the two litre cars, with a drive in both the Eurocup Formula Renault 2.0 for Pons Racing, and the Italian Formula Renault Championship for Facondini Racing. Clos struggled in the pan-European championship, failing to record a finish inside the top ten placings all season. His best finish came during the 11th round of the championship at Donington Park, when he recorded an 11th-place finish. He was slightly more successful in the Italian series despite missing three races due to Eurocup commitments, finishing sixteenth in the championship with 28 points beating teammate Oliver Campos-Hull in the process. His best finishes were a pair of sevenths, coming at Imola in round three, and also at Spa during round six. Clos would return to both series for a second season in 2006.

Clos moved to Jenzer Motorsport for both campaigns in 2006, hoping to give him a little more success than what he had for his previous two teams in 2005. His European campaign landed him in seventh place overall in a tightly-contested championship. He won three races, second only to champion Filipe Albuquerque's tally of four, and these wins came in succession – doing the double at Istanbul Park and winning the first race at Misano. He had originally done the double at Misano, which would have taken his tally to four in succession, however he was disqualified due to his car's diffuser height not complying with Eurocup regulations. This handed Chris van der Drift his first victory of the 2006 season.

In the Italian championship, Clos got off to a steady start with a second and two third places in the first six races which at the time of the Spa round in early June, Clos was already some way behind championship leader Adrian Zaugg, who had won five of the first six races, and had finished third in the race that he didn't win. However, the rest of the season belonged to Clos. He won eight of the last nine races to overhaul Zaugg and win the championship by 36 points in the end. He recorded four double victories at Spa, Hockenheim, Misano and Monza and finished second in the single-race meeting at Varano.

=== Formula Three Euroseries ===
After his title win, Clos moved up to the Formula Three Euroseries for the 2007 season, signing up to drive for Signature-Plus. Clos had a solid, yet unspectacular first season with a championship position of 13th, with thirteen points. His best result was a fourth place during the reverse-grid round sixteen in Barcelona – the race now infamous with one of the biggest startline crashes in Euroseries history, in which nine cars were eliminated. He also finished fifteenth during the Masters of Formula 3 event at Zolder, finishing some four seconds behind the eventual Euroseries champion Romain Grosjean and some 42 seconds behind winner Hülkenberg.

Clos returned to the series for a second season in 2008, this time moving to Prema Powerteam. However, he ended up one place lower than what he was in 2007, finishing 14th with a total of 16.5 points. He only recorded six points-scoring finishes during the season, two of which were podium finishes coming at Pau (third) and second in the rain-shortened race at Le Mans. He would have finished level on points with Jon Lancaster on 19 points had he been awarded five points rather than 2.5 at Le Mans. He also recorded a fastest lap in round 2 at Hockenheim, and started round 4 at Mugello from pole, thanks to the reverse-grid system.

=== Formula Renault 3.5 Series ===
Clos made his debut in Formula Renault 3.5 Series at Le Mans for Epsilon Euskadi, replacing Adrián Vallés, who was busy driving the Liverpool F.C. car in Superleague Formula at Zolder. In his first race, he moved from 20th on the grid, to finish tenth and pick up a championship point. He also picked up the bonus point for progressing the most spots during the race, with ten. He continued in the series at the Autódromo Internacional do Algarve, picking up a point for qualifying third in his group. A ninth-place finish was his best result of the weekend, which also included an incident with teammate Chris van der Drift. He was replaced by Keisuke Kunimoto for the final two rounds.

=== GP2 Series ===
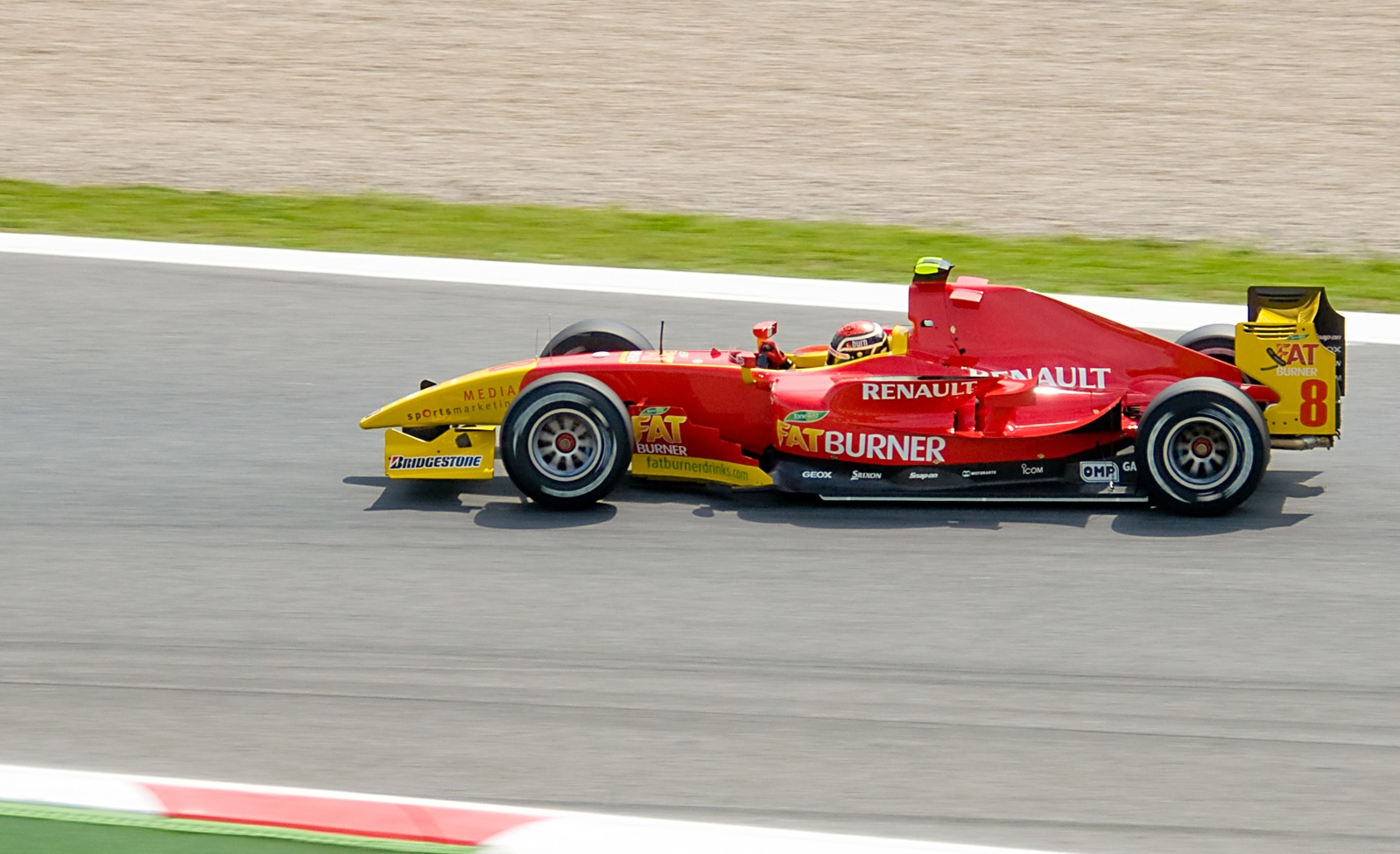
Clos driving for Racing Engineering at the Catalunya round of the 2009 GP2 Series season.

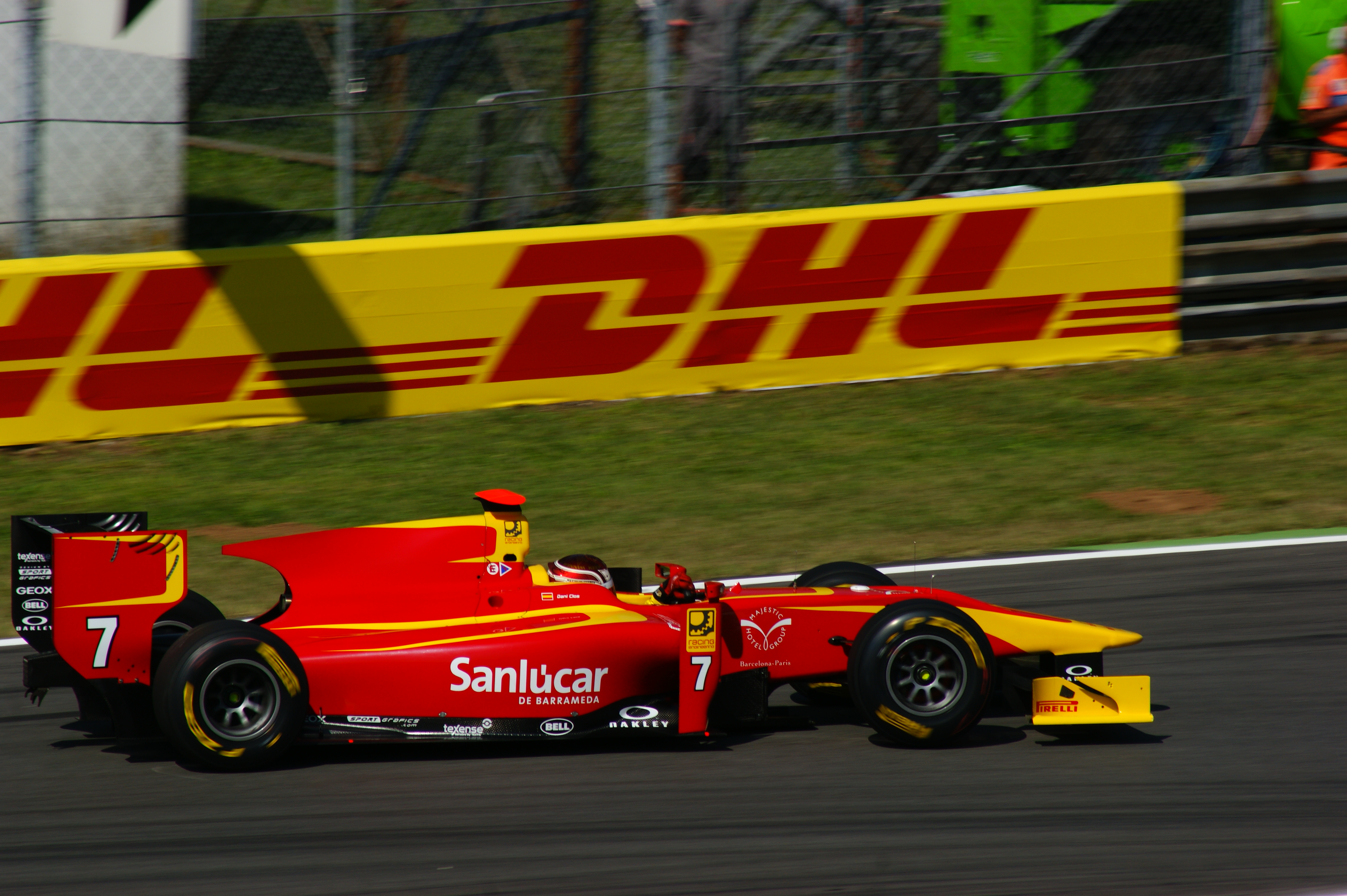
Clos driving for Racing Engineering at the Monza round of the 2011 GP2 Series season.

Having tested for both GP2 Series teams and ones in the Formula Renault 3.5 Series, Clos was signed by the Racing Engineering team for the 2009 GP2 Series on 8 February 2009. He scored his first points and podium in the final race at the Autódromo Internacional do Algarve, ending up 21st overall. In the off-season, he contested two rounds of the GP2 Asia Series for Trident Racing. He continued with Racing Engineering into the 2010 season. Clos became a regular podium contender in 2010, scoring points in every round and had one retirement at the Monaco sprint race. He won his maiden GP2 race at the Turkish sprint round, and as of the Hungaroring race occupied third in the championship. At the Belgian round of the championship, he suffered a compressed vertebra in a collision at the start of the feature race, and did not take part in the sprint race. Clos has remained with Racing Engineering for the 2011 season; his teammates thus far have been Christian Vietoris and Álvaro Parente. The team also competed in the GP2 Asia Series for the first time, in which Clos, partnered with Nathanaël Berthon, scored a race win at Imola to finish ninth in the championship. In the main series, he finished ninth in the championship with a best finish of two second places.

Clos began the 2012 season without a drive, but was drafted into the Barwa Addax team after the first round of the championship, replacing Josef Král and alongside Johnny Cecotto. After four races in the seat, Král returned to take it back over.

=== Formula One ===
Clos has been employed on a few occasions as a test driver for the Williams F1 team, the first of these came in September 2008, when he participated in a day's testing at Jerez in Spain. He tested again in December 2008 at the same circuit, for another day's testing.

Clos also took part in the Abu Dhabi young drivers' test on 15 November 2011 at the Yas Marina Circuit. He drove 68 laps in the HRT F1 Team's F111 and ended the day 12th with a fastest time of 1’45.329.

On 13 February 2012, Clos was announced as the HRT F1 Team's test driver for the 2012 season. He made his race weekend début at the Spanish Grand Prix and again took part at the British, German and Hungarian Grands Prix, driving Narain Karthikeyan's car during the first free practice session on these occasions.

== Racing record ==
=== Complete Eurocup Formula Renault 2.0 results ===
(key) (Races in bold indicate pole position; races in italics indicate fastest lap)

Year	Entrant	1	2	3	4	5	6	7	8	9	10	11	12	13	14	15	16	DC	Points
2005	Pons Racing	ZOL; 1 Ret	ZOL; 2; 31	VAL; 1; 30	VAL; 2 Ret	LMS; 1; 18	LMS; 2; 17	BIL; 1 Ret	BIL; 2; 23	OSC; 1; 14	OSC; 2 Ret	DON; 1; 11	DON; 2; 15	EST; 1; 26	EST; 2; 22	MNZ; 1; 15	MNZ; 2; 13	32nd	2
2006	Jenzer Motorsport	ZOL; 1; 11	ZOL; 2; 10	**IST**; **1**; 1	IST; 2; 1	**MIS**; **1**; 1	MIS; 2 DSQ	NÜR; 1; 4	NÜR; 2; 4	DON; 1; 10	DON; 2; 10	LMS; 1; 10	LMS; 2 Ret	CAT; 1 Ret	CAT; 2; 19			7th	70

=== Complete Formula Renault 2.0 Italia results ===
(key)

Year	Entrant	1	2	3	4	5	6	7	8	9	10	11	12	13	14	15	16	17	DC	Points
2005	Facondini Racing	VLL; 1; 16	VLL; 2; 14	IMO; 1; 7	IMO; 2; 16	SPA; 1; 8	SPA; 2; 7	MNZ1; 1 Ret	MNZ1; 2; 21	MNZ1; 3; 31	MUG; 1	MUG; 2	MIS; 1; 9	MIS; 2; 17	MIS; 3; 9	VAR	MNZ2; 1; 15	MNZ2; 2 Ret	16th	28
2006	Jenzer Motorsport	MUG; 1; 6	MUG; 2; 4	VLL; 1; 2	VLL; 2; 12	IMO; 1; 3	IMO; 2; 3	**SPA**; **1**; 1	**SPA**; **2**; 1	HOC; 1; 1	**HOC**; **2**; 1	**MIS**; **1**; 1	**MIS**; **2**; 1	VAR; 2	MNZ; 1; 1	MNZ; 2; 1			1st	378

=== Complete Formula 3 Euro Series results ===
(key)

Year	Entrant	Chassis	Engine	1	2	3	4	5	6	7	8	9	10	11	12	13	14	15	16	17	18	19	20	DC	Points
2007	Signature-Plus	Dallara 305/029	Mercedes	HOC; 1; 9	HOC; 2; 9	BRH; 1; 11	BRH; 2; 20†	NOR; 1 Ret	NOR; 2; 10	MAG; 1; 11	MAG; 2; 10	MUG; 1; 7	MUG; 2; 11	ZAN; 1 Ret	ZAN; 2 Ret	NÜR; 1; 7	NÜR; 2; 5	CAT; 1; 12	CAT; 2; 4	NOG; 1; 12	NOG; 2; 10	HOC; 1; 8	HOC; 2; 5	13th	13
2008	Prema Powerteam	Dallara F308/031	Mercedes	HOC; 1 Ret	HOC; 2; 7	MUG; 1; 8	MUG; 2; 9	PAU; 1; 6	PAU; 2; 3	NOR; 1; 21	NOR; 2 Ret	ZAN; 1; 15	ZAN; 2; 15	NÜR; 1 Ret	NÜR; 2 Ret	BRH; 1; 16	BRH; 2; 14	CAT; 1; 6	CAT; 2; 16	LMS; 1; 6	LMS; 2; 2	HOC; 1; 9	HOC; 2; 11	14th	16.5

=== Complete GP2 Series results ===
(key) (Races in bold indicate pole position) (Races in italics indicate fastest lap)

Year	Entrant	1	2	3	4	5	6	7	8	9	10	11	12	13	14	15	16	17	18	19	20	21	22	23	24	DC	Points
2009	Racing Engineering	ESP; FEA; Ret	ESP; SPR; 19	MON; FEA; Ret	MON; SPR; Ret	IST; FEA; 12	IST; SPR; 7	SIL; FEA; 13	SIL; SPR; Ret	HOC; FEA; 16	HOC; SPR; 8	HUN; FEA; 11	HUN; SPR; 11	VAL; FEA; Ret	VAL; SPR; Ret	BEL; FEA; 10	BEL; SPR; Ret	MNZ; FEA; 15	MNZ; SPR; Ret	ALG; FEA; 9	ALG; SPR; 3					21st	4
2010	Racing Engineering	ESP; FEA; 3	ESP; SPR; 6	**MON**; **FEA**; 3	MON; SPR; Ret	IST; FEA; 8	IST; SPR; 1	VAL; FEA; 5	VAL; SPR; 7	SIL; FEA; 3	SIL; SPR; 3	HOC; FEA; 4	HOC; SPR; 6	HUN; FEA; 16	HUN; SPR; 7	BEL; FEA; Ret	BEL; SPR; DNS	MNZ; FEA; Ret	MNZ; SPR; 12	YMC; FEA; 4	YMC; SPR; 4					4th	51
2011	Racing Engineering	IST; FEA; 8	IST; SPR; 15	CAT; FEA; 6	CAT; SPR; 2	MON; FEA; Ret	MON; SPR; 18	VAL; FEA; 4	VAL; SPR; 5	SIL; FEA; 6	SIL; SPR; 2	NÜR; FEA; 7	NÜR; SPR; Ret	HUN; FEA; 10	HUN; SPR; Ret	SPA; FEA; 6	SPA; SPR; 6	MNZ; FEA; 13	MNZ; SPR; 7							9th	30
2012	Barwa Addax Team	SEP; FEA	SEP; SPR	BHR1; FEA; 19	BHR1; SPR; 11	BHR2; FEA; Ret	BHR2; SPR; Ret	CAT; FEA	CAT; SPR	MON; FEA	MON; SPR	VAL; FEA	VAL; SPR	SIL; FEA	SIL; SPR	HOC; FEA	HOC; SPR	HUN; FEA	HUN; SPR	SPA; FEA	SPA; SPR	MNZ; FEA	MNZ; SPR	MRN; FEA	MRN; SPR	28th	0
2013	MP Motorsport	SEP; FEA	SEP; SPR	BHR; FEA	BHR; SPR	CAT; FEA	CAT; SPR	MON; FEA	MON; SPR	SIL; FEA	SIL; SPR	NÜR; FEA	NÜR; SPR	HUN; FEA; 14	HUN; SPR; Ret	SPA; FEA; 20	SPA; SPR; 19	MNZ; FEA; 18	MNZ; SPR; 9	MRN; FEA; 10	MRN; SPR; 21	YMC; FEA; 5	YMC; SPR; 2			18th	25

==== Complete GP2 Asia Series results ====
(key) (Races in bold indicate pole position) (Races in italics indicate fastest lap)

Year	Entrant	1	2	3	4	5	6	7	8	DC	Points
2009–10	Trident Racing	YMC1; FEA	YMC1; SPR	YMC2; FEA; Ret	YMC2; SPR; 13	BHR1; FEA	BHR1; SPR	BHR2; FEA; 14	BHR2; SPR; 12	27th	0
2011	Racing Engineering	YMC; FEA; Ret	YMC; SPR; 22	IMO; FEA; 7	IMO; SPR; 1					9th	8

==== Complete GP2 Final results ====
(key) (Races in bold indicate pole position) (Races in italics indicate fastest lap)

Year	Entrant	1	2	DC	Points
2011	Rapax	YMC; FEA; Ret	YMC; SPR; 9	12th	0

=== Complete Formula Renault 3.5 Series results ===
(key) (Races in bold indicate pole position) (Races in italics indicate fastest lap)

Year	Team	1	2	3	4	5	6	7	8	9	10	11	12	13	14	15	16	17	Pos	Points
2009	Epsilon Euskadi	CAT; SPR	CAT; FEA	SPA; SPR	SPA; FEA	MON; FEA	HUN; SPR	HUN; FEA	SIL; SPR	SIL; FEA	BUG; SPR; 10	BUG; FEA; 17	ALG; SPR; Ret	ALG; FEA; 9	NÜR; SPR	NÜR; FEA	ALC; SPR	ALC; FEA	25th	5

=== Complete Formula One participations ===
(key) (Races in bold indicate pole position) (Races in italics indicates fastest lap)

Year	Entrant	Chassis	Engine	1	2	3	4	5	6	7	8	9	10	11	12	13	14	15	16	17	18	19	20	WDC	Points
2012	HRT Formula 1 Team	HRT F112	Cosworth CA2012 2.4 V8	AUS	MAL	CHN	BHR	ESP; TD	MON	CAN	EUR	GBR; TD	GER; TD	HUN; TD	BEL; TD	ITA	SIN	JPN	KOR; TD	IND	ABU	USA	BRA	-	-

=== Complete European Le Mans Series results ===
(key) (Races in bold indicate pole position; results in italics indicate fastest lap)

Year	Entrant	Class	Chassis	Engine	1	2	3	4	5	6	Rank	Points
2019	Inter Europol Competition	LMP2	Ligier JS P217	Gibson GK428 4.2 L V8	LEC; 15	MNZ; 13	CAT; Ret	SIL	SPA	ALG	34th	1

Sporting positions
Preceded by Kamui Kobayashi	Italian Formula Renault champion 2006	Succeeded by Mika Mäki
