= 2010 Catalunya GP2 Series round =

2010 GP2 race held in Spain

(Spain) 2010 Spanish GP2 round
Round details
- Round 1 of 10 rounds in the 2010 GP2 Series
- Circuit de Catalunya
- Location: Circuit de Catalunya; Montmeló, Spain
- Course: Permanent racing facility 4.655 km (2.892 mi)

GP2 Series

Feature race
- Date: 8 May 2010
- Laps: 37

Pole position
| Driver | (France) Jules Bianchi | ART Grand Prix |
- Time: 1:27.727

Podium
| First | (France) Charles Pic | Arden International Motorsport |
| Second | (Italy) Giacomo Ricci | DPR |
| Third | (Spain) Dani Clos | Racing Engineering |

Fastest lap
| Driver | (United Kingdom) Sam Bird | ART Grand Prix |
- Time: 1:31.754 (on lap 4)

Sprint race
- Date: 9 May 2010
- Laps: 25

Podium
| First | (Switzerland) Fabio Leimer | Ocean Racing Technology |
| Second | (Brazil) Luiz Razia | Rapax Team |
| Third | (Venezuela) Pastor Maldonado | Rapax Team |

Fastest lap
| Driver | (Switzerland) Fabio Leimer | Ocean Racing Technology |
- Time: 1:31.229 (on lap 7)

The 2010 Catalunya GP2 Series round was a GP2 Series motor race held on May 8 and May 9, 2010 at the Circuit de Catalunya in Montmeló, Spain. It was the first race of the 2010 GP2 Series. The race was used to support the 2010 Spanish Grand Prix.

== Report ==
=== Qualifying ===
Jules Bianchi gained pole position for the feature race on his first outing for ART.

=== Feature race ===
In Race 1, Charles Pic won an eventful first race of the 2010 GP2 season at Barcelona. The rookie Frenchman moved into first place when previous leader Sergio Pérez (Barwa Addax) was delayed by a slow pitstop, and survived a brief challenge from DPR's Giacomo Ricci to take Arden's first win since the same event 12 months ago. Ricci's second place was an equally memorable result for DPR, a team that scored precisely one point between 2007 and 2009, and has not won a race since the inaugural GP2 season in 2005. Completing the podium was local man Dani Clos of Racing Engineering, who staked his claim to the position with a pass on Pastor Maldonado earlier in the race. Pérez finished just off the podium, but compared to other title rivals, fared well. ART pairing of polesitter Jules Bianchi and Sam Bird were just 2 drivers who suffered at the start. Bianchi led into the first corner, only to collide with Racing Engineering's Christian Vietoris. Both cars were out of the race, while Bird was forced wide in the melee behind him and had to return to the pits for a new nose. At that point he seemed out of contention, but the Briton produced a stunning drive from the back of the grid, reminiscent of Lewis Hamilton's drive through the field in Turkey 2006, to haul himself back up to ninth at the finish, falling just 1.6s short of taking the final point and sprint race pole from Ocean Racing's Fabio Leimer. Less fortunate in his progress through the field was Barwa Addax's Giedo van der Garde, who was dealt a 10s penalty for leaving the pit exit after it had closed prior to the race, and then a drive-through for jumping the start.

=== Sprint race ===
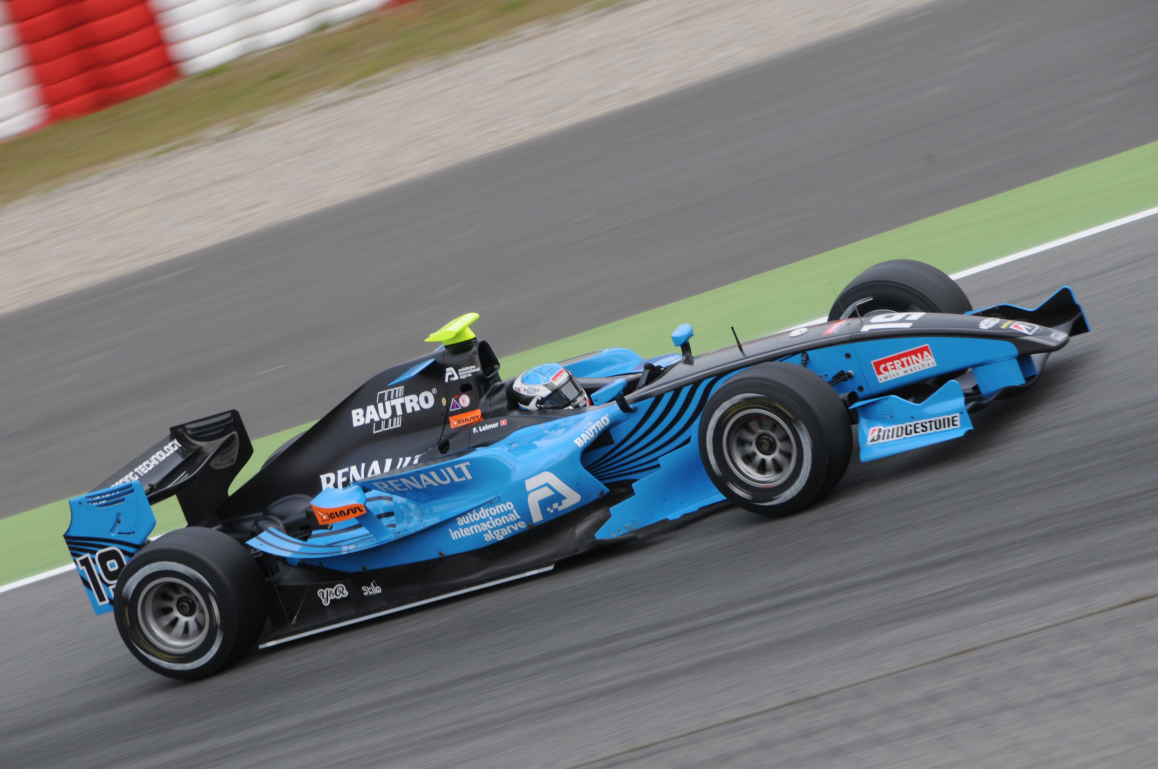
Fabio Leimer

Fabio Leimer survived a late push from Luiz Razia to win the second GP2 Series Race at Barcelona. The Swiss driver, who was making his series debut, started from pole and opened a gap of as much as 4.3 seconds during the middle part of the race. But Razia came back at him over the closing laps, and crossed the line just 0.7s in arrears. It was the second-ever win for the Ocean Racing Technology squad, while third for Razia's team-mate Pastor Maldonado secured a two-three for Rapax. The race was fairly processional at the front, but there was more competition for the minor points placings. ART's Sam Bird echoed his overtaking masterclass of the day before with another excellent performance, the Briton climbing from ninth to fourth, and he could potentially have challenged for third were it not a late excursion into the gravel that cost him six seconds. Oliver Turvey held on to fifth despite lapping around 1.5s off the pace in an unco-operative iSport car, leading a train of cars behind him headed by a frustrated Dani Clos (Racing Engineering). Once again it was a difficult day for some of the series favourites, with Jules Bianchi finishing 12th after banging wheels with Giedo van der Garde and sliding off the track, while Sergio Pérez was unable to make the start after the engine in his Barwa Addax Dallara blew on the formation lap. There could be more bad news ahead for the Mexican, who is facing a post-race investigation for trailing oil around the racing line on two thirds of the lap before finally pulling over, forcing the start to be delayed by 10 minutes while powder was laid down.

== Classification ==
=== Qualifying ===
| Pos | No | Name | Team | Time | Grid |
|---|---|---|---|---|---|
| 1 | 1 | (France) Jules Bianchi | ART Grand Prix | 1:27.727 | 1 |
| 2 | 4 | (Mexico) Sergio Pérez | Barwa Addax Team | 1:28.011 | 2 |
| 3 | 2 | (United Kingdom) Sam Bird | ART Grand Prix | 1:28.241 | 3 |
| 4 | 8 | (Germany) Christian Vietoris | Racing Engineering | 1:28.254 | 4 |
| 5 | 9 | (United Kingdom) Oliver Turvey | iSport International | 1:28.298 | 5 |
| 6 | 16 | (France) Charles Pic | Arden International Motorsport | 1:28.300 | 6 |
| 7 | 7 | (Spain) Dani Clos | Racing Engineering | 1:28.372 | 7 |
| 8 | 6 | (Sweden) Marcus Ericsson | Super Nova Racing | 1:28.376 | 8 |
| 9 | 15 | (Venezuela) Pastor Maldonado | Rapax | 1:28.670 | 9 |
| 10 | 10 | (Italy) Davide Valsecchi | iSport International | 1:28.714 | 10 |
| 11 | 19 | (Switzerland) Fabio Leimer | Ocean Racing Technology | 1:28.723 | 11 |
| 12 | 27 | (Italy) Giacomo Ricci | DPR | 1:28.969 | 12 |
| 13 | 3 | (Netherlands) Giedo van der Garde | Barwa Addax Team | 1:29.000 | 16^{1} |
| 14 | 14 | (Brazil) Luiz Razia | Rapax | 1:29.065 | 13 |
| 15 | 24 | (Venezuela) Johnny Cecotto Jr. | Trident Racing | 1:29.129 | 14 |
| 16 | 11 | (Belgium) Jérôme d'Ambrosio | DAMS | 1:29.238 | 15 |
| 17 | 20 | (Brazil) Alberto Valerio | Scuderia Coloni | 1:29.271 | 17 |
| 18 | 5 | (Czech Republic) Josef Král | Super Nova Racing | 1:29.382 | 18 |
| 19 | 18 | (United Kingdom) Max Chilton | Ocean Racing Technology | 1:29.437 | 19 |
| 20 | 26 | (Romania) Michael Herck | DPR | 1:29.500 | 20 |
| 21 | 25 | (South Africa) Adrian Zaugg | Trident Racing | 1:29.518 | 21 |
| 22 | 12 | (China) Ho-Pin Tung | DAMS | 1:29.519 | 22 |
| 23 | 21 | (Bulgaria) Vladimir Arabadzhiev | Scuderia Coloni | 1:29.912 | 23 |
| 24 | 17 | (Venezuela) Rodolfo González | Arden International Motorsport | 1:30.209 | 24 |

Notes

1. – Giedo van der Garde received a three-place grid penalty because of impeding Jérôme d'Ambrosio in qualifying.

=== Feature Race ===
| Pos | No | Driver | Team | Laps | Time/Retired | Grid | Points |
|---|---|---|---|---|---|---|---|
| 1 | 16 | (France) Charles Pic | Arden International Motorsport | 43 | 0:57:54.177 | 6 | 10 |
| 2 | 27 | (Italy) Giacomo Ricci | DPR | 43 | +1.489 | 12 | 8 |
| 3 | 7 | (Spain) Dani Clos | Racing Engineering | 43 | +4.209 | 7 | 6 |
| 4 | 4 | (Mexico) Sergio Pérez | Barwa Addax Team | 43 | +5.111 | 2 | 5 |
| 5 | 9 | (United Kingdom) Oliver Turvey | iSport International | 43 | +18.339 | 5 | 4 |
| 6 | 15 | (Venezuela) Pastor Maldonado | Rapax | 43 | +30.211 | 9 | 3 |
| 7 | 14 | (Brazil) Luiz Razia | Rapax | 43 | +30.568 | 14 | 2 |
| 8 | 19 | (Switzerland) Fabio Leimer | Ocean Racing Technology | 43 | +34.321 | 11 | 1 |
| 9 | 2 | (United Kingdom) Sam Bird | ART Grand Prix | 43 | +35.961 | 3 | 1 |
| 10 | 10 | (Italy) Davide Valsecchi | iSport International | 43 | +44.064 | 10 | |
| 11 | 6 | (Sweden) Marcus Ericsson | Super Nova Racing | 43 | +50.352 | 8 | |
| 12 | 5 | (Czech Republic) Josef Král | Super Nova Racing | 43 | +51.682 | 18 | |
| 13 | 12 | (China) Ho-Pin Tung | DAMS | 43 | +53.450 | 22 | |
| 14 | 20 | (Brazil) Alberto Valerio | Scuderia Coloni | 43 | +59.837 | 17 | |
| 15 | 17 | (Venezuela) Rodolfo González | Arden International Motorsport | 43 | +1:06.180 | 24 | |
| 16 | 25 | (South Africa) Adrian Zaugg | Trident Racing | 43 | +1:06.394 | 21 | |
| 17 | 26 | (Romania) Michael Herck | DPR | 43 | +1:06.689 | 20 | |
| 18 | 18 | (United Kingdom) Max Chilton | Ocean Racing Technology | 43 | +1:11.572 | 19 | |
| 19 | 21 | (Bulgaria) Vladimir Arabadzhiev | Scuderia Coloni | 43 | +1:16.292 | 23 | |
| 20 | 3 | (Netherlands) Giedo van der Garde | Barwa Addax Team | 43 | +1:17.173 | 13 | |
| Ret | 11 | (Belgium) Jérôme d'Ambrosio | DAMS | 12 | Retired | 16 | |
| Ret | 1 | (France) Jules Bianchi | ART Grand Prix | 0 | Retired | 1 | 2 |
| Ret | 8 | (Germany) Christian Vietoris | Racing Engineering | 0 | Retired | 4 | |
| Ret | 24 | (Venezuela) Johnny Cecotto Jr. | Trident Racing | 0 | Retired | 15 | |

=== Sprint Race ===
| Pos | No | Driver | Team | Laps | Time/Retired | Grid | Points |
|---|---|---|---|---|---|---|---|
| 1 | 19 | (Switzerland) Fabio Leimer | Ocean Racing Technology | 25 | 38:31.849 | 1 | 6 + 1 |
| 2 | 14 | (Brazil) Luiz Razia | Rapax | 25 | +0.755 | 2 | 5 |
| 3 | 15 | (Venezuela) Pastor Maldonado | Rapax | 25 | +4.850 | 3 | 4 |
| 4 | 2 | (United Kingdom) Sam Bird | ART Grand Prix | 25 | +14.274 | 9 | 3 |
| 5 | 9 | (United Kingdom) Oliver Turvey | iSport International | 25 | +26.785 | 4 | 2 |
| 6 | 7 | (Spain) Dani Clos | Racing Engineering | 25 | +27.433 | 6 | 1 |
| 7 | 16 | (France) Charles Pic | Arden International Motorsport | 25 | +28.459 | 8 | |
| 8 | 27 | (Italy) Giacomo Ricci | DPR | 25 | +29.077 | 7 | |
| 9 | 3 | (Netherlands) Giedo van der Garde | Barwa Addax Team | 25 | +29.889 | 20 | |
| 10 | 12 | (China) Ho-Pin Tung | DAMS | 25 | +31.323 | 13 | |
| 11 | 10 | (Italy) Davide Valsecchi | iSport International | 25 | +39.226 | 10 | |
| 12 | 1 | (France) Jules Bianchi | ART Grand Prix | 25 | +39.584 | 22 | |
| 13 | 11 | (Belgium) Jérôme d'Ambrosio | DAMS | 25 | +39.661 | 21 | |
| 14 | 17 | (Venezuela) Rodolfo González | Arden International Motorsport | 25 | +51.383 | 15 | |
| 15 | 25 | (South Africa) Adrian Zaugg | Trident Racing | 25 | +51.971 | 16 | |
| 16 | 18 | (United Kingdom) Max Chilton | Ocean Racing Technology | 25 | +52.473 | 18 | |
| 17 | 24 | (Venezuela) Johnny Cecotto Jr. | Trident Racing | 25 | +53.489 | 24 | |
| 18 | 8 | (Germany) Christian Vietoris | Racing Engineering | 25 | +54.129 | 23 | |
| 19 | 5 | (Czech Republic) Josef Král | Super Nova Racing | 25 | +54.772 | 12 | |
| 20 | 21 | (Bulgaria) Vladimir Arabadzhiev | Scuderia Coloni | 25 | +56.388 | 19 | |
| 21 | 26 | (Romania) Michael Herck | DPR | 25 | +1:05.541 | 17 | |
| Ret | 6 | (Sweden) Marcus Ericsson | Super Nova Racing | 2 | Retired | 11 | |
| DNS | 20 | (Brazil) Alberto Valerio | Scuderia Coloni | 0 | Did not start | 14 | |
| DNS | 4 | (Mexico) Sergio Pérez | Barwa Addax Team | 0 | Did not start | 5 | |

== Standings after the round ==
Drivers' Championship standings

| Pos | Driver | Points |
|---|---|---|
| 1 | (France) Charles Pic | 10 |
| 2 | (Switzerland) Fabio Leimer | 8 |
| 3 | (Italy) Giacomo Ricci | 8 |
| 4 | (Brazil) Luiz Razia | 7 |
| 5 | (Spain) Dani Clos | 7 |

Teams' Championship standings

| Pos | Team | Points |
|---|---|---|
| 1 | (Italy) Rapax | 14 |
| 2 | (Netherlands) Arden International Motorsport | 10 |
| 3 | (Portugal) Ocean Racing Technology | 8 |
| 4 | (United Kingdom) DPR | 8 |
| 5 | (Spain) Racing Engineering | 7 |

- Note: Only the top five positions are included for both sets of standings.

== See also ==
- 2010 Spanish Grand Prix
- 2010 Catalunya GP3 Series round

| Previous round: 2009 Portuguese GP2 round | GP2 Series; 2010 season | Next round: 2010 Monaco GP2 round |
| Previous round: 2009 Spanish GP2 round | Spanish GP2 round | Next round: 2011 Spanish GP2 round |
