= Luiz Razia =

Brazilian racing driver (born 1989)

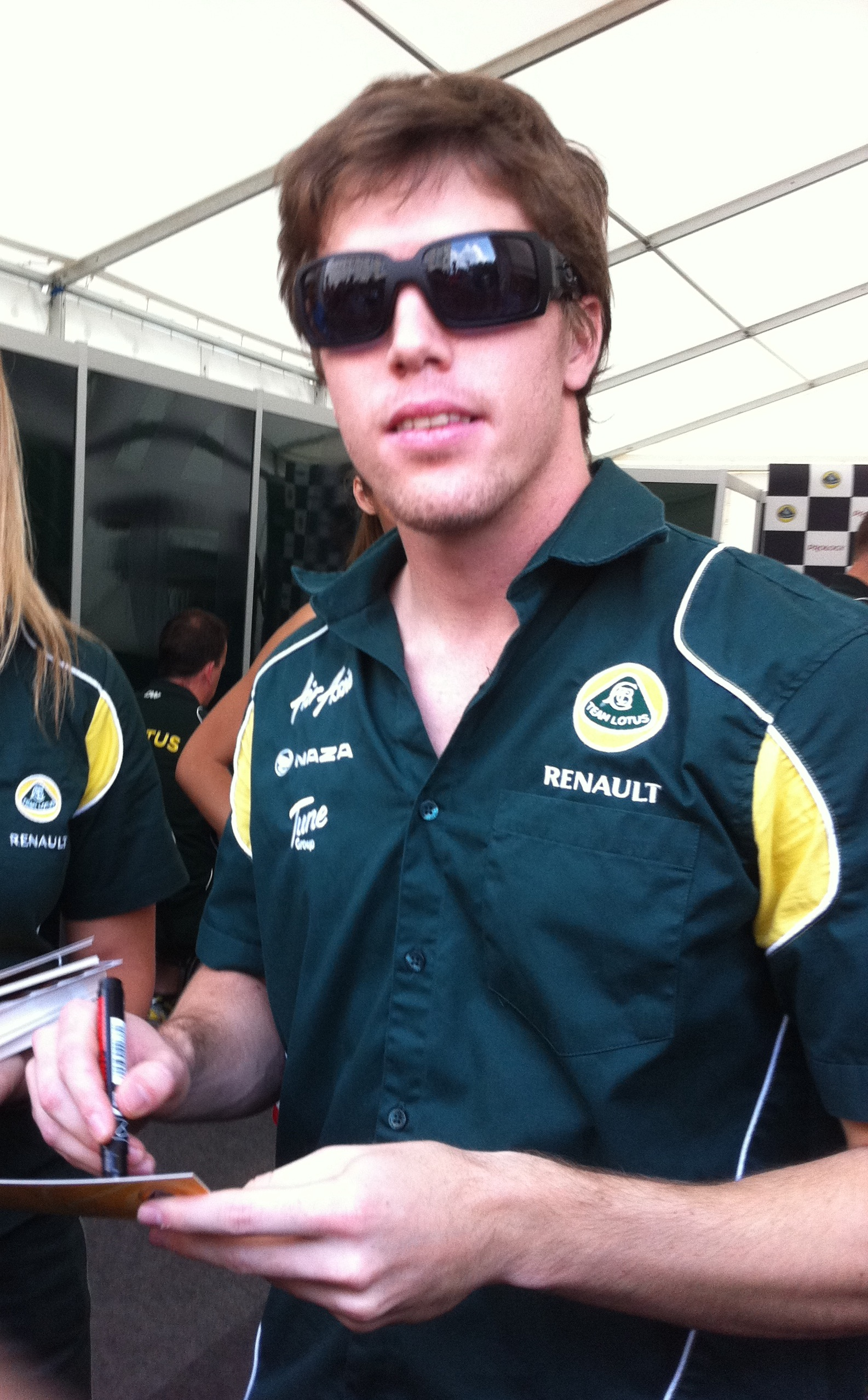
- Razia at Moscow City Racing 2011
- Nationality: (Brazil) Brazilian
- Born: Luiz Tadeu Razia Filho; 4 April 1989 (age 37) Barreiras, Bahia, Brazil

Indy Lights career
- Debut season: 2014
- Current team: Schmidt Peterson Motorsports
- Car number: 7
- Starts: 7
- Wins: 1
- Poles: 2
- Fastest laps: 1

Previous series
- 2013 2009–2012 2008-09–2011 2007–2008 2007 2007 2005–2006: International GT Open; GP2 Series; GP2 Asia Series; Euroseries 3000; Formula Renault 3.5 Series; Italian Formula 3000; Formula 3 Sudamericana

Championship titles
- 2006: Formula 3 Sudamericana

Luiz Tadeu Razia Filho (born 4 April 1989) is a Brazilian former racing driver and businessman.

== Career ==
=== Early career ===
Razia began his single seater career in 2005 in the South American Formula 3 championship. Driving for Dragão Motorsport, Razia finished sixth in the championship taking six podium finishes, including two race wins. During the season, he also took part in the Brazilian Formula Renault 2.0 series, finishing the year tenth in the standings.

For 2006, Razia remained in South American Formula 3, taking eleven podium places and seven race wins to win the title ahead of Mario Moraes and Diego Nunes. He also contested three races in the Formula 3000 International Masters series for Charouz Racing, winning all three of them to finish eighth in the championship. He also became a rookie driver for A1 Team Brazil in the 2006–07 A1 Grand Prix season.

The following year, Razia moved to Europe to race in the Euroseries 3000 championship. He began the season with Fisichella Motor Sport, but made a mid-season change to ELK Motorsport following the departure of Alx Danielsson. During the season, he took four podium places to finish third in the Euroseries standings and fourth in the Italian championship, which ran as part of the main series. Razia also contested four races in the World Series by Renault when he replaced Ricardo Risatti at GD Racing.

In 2008, Razia remained in Euroseries 3000 with ELK Motorsport, partnering Frenchman Nicolas Prost, the son of four-time Formula One World Champion Alain Prost. In the Italian Formula 3000 standings he once again finished the season in fourth place, taking three podiums including his first race win at Misano.

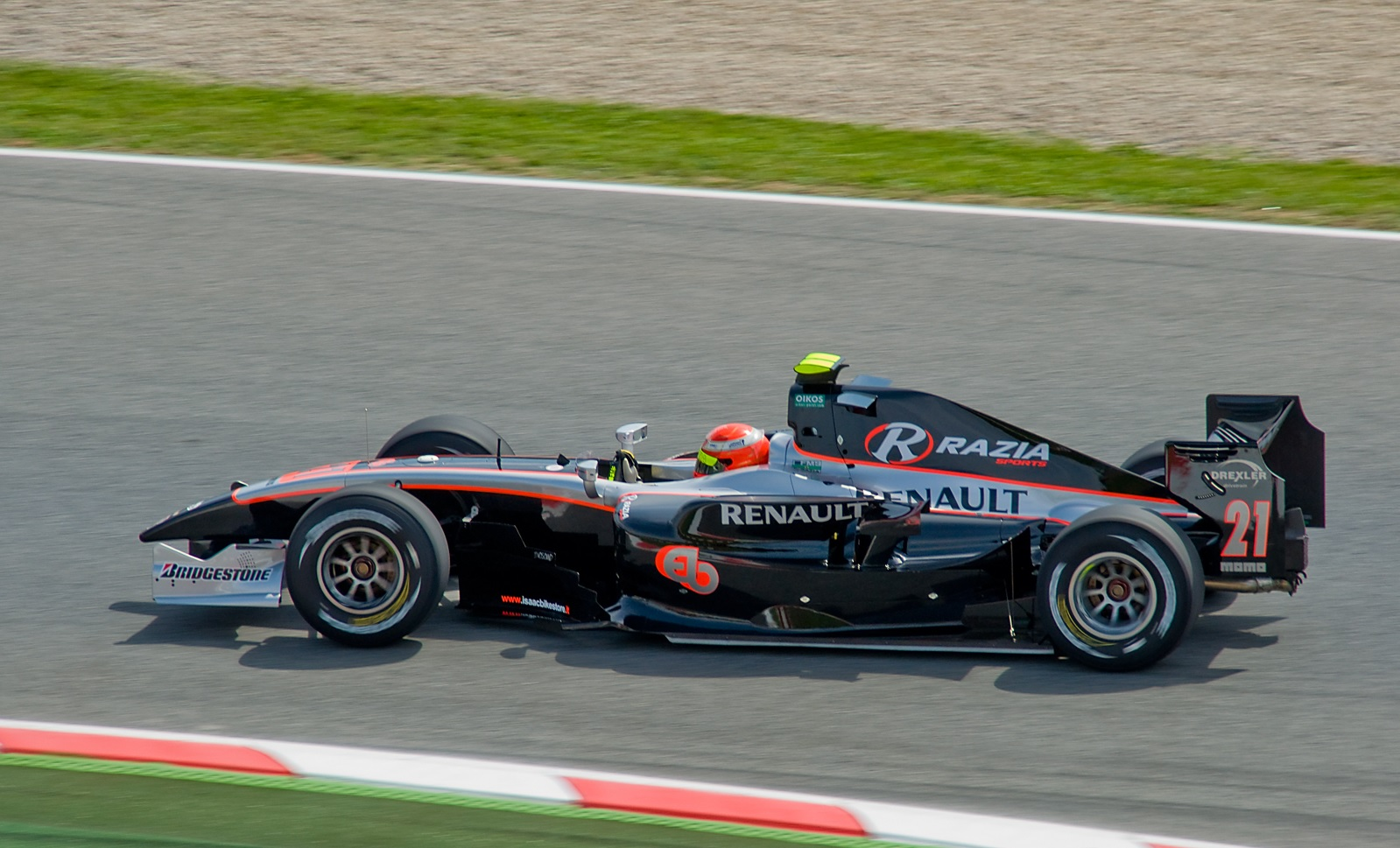
Razia driving for Fisichella Motor Sport at the Catalunya round of the 2009 GP2 Series season.

Towards the end of 2006, Razia tested a GP2 car at Jerez for the Racing Engineering team, and in September 2008 he tested again for the team at the Paul Ricard circuit in Southern France. On 2 October 2008, Razia joined the Trust Team Arden for the 2008–09 GP2 Asia Series season. He scored his first championship points in Qatar, with an eighth in the feature race and a sixth in the sprint race. In the final race of the season in Bahrain, Luiz claimed his first win, having started from the pole – due to the series' reverse-grid system – as he had finished eighth in the feature race the day before.

Razia signed for Fisichella Motor Sport to compete in the main GP2 Series in 2009. After taking his first point at Autodromo Nazionale Monza during the feature race, Razia led from pole to take his first GP2 win, in a similar way to his win in Bahrain during GP2 Asia.

Razia joined Max Chilton in the Barwa Addax Team for the 2009–10 GP2 Asia Series season, but both drivers were replaced before the second round of the championship, with Chilton moving to Ocean Racing Technology. Razia returned for the final round in Bahrain, replacing Daniel Zampieri at the Rapax Team.

Razia remained with Rapax for the 2010 GP2 Series season. He started strongly, finishing the first six races in the points (including two podiums), but then endured a barren run until the final round of the season, eventually finishing eleventh in the drivers' championship. His team-mate, Pastor Maldonado, became the series champion, whilst Razia helped Rapax to claim the teams' title.

As part of his Formula One testing deal with the Lotus team, Razia signed to drive for the new AirAsia team in 2011, alongside fellow Lotus tester Davide Valsecchi. He scored no points in the Asia series, but finished sixth in the first race of the main series season, to earn the team three points in its inaugural main series start. He later took his first series pole position at the Hungaroring, and finished 12th in the championship.

For the 2012 season, Razia moved to the Arden International team alongside Simon Trummer, and won the feature race in Malaysia to lead the championship after the first round of the championship. Davide Valsecchi then moved ahead, but Razia retook the lead by winning the Silverstone sprint race, having also won in Catalunya and Valencia. However, Valsecchi edged back in front over the course of the remainder of the season, and Razia ultimately had to settle for the runner-up position in the championship.

=== Formula One ===
==== Testing role (2010—2012) ====
Razia made his first appearance in a Formula One team when he joined Virgin Racing as a test driver in 2010. Razia drove the car during the Young Drivers' Test at the end of the season, but did not participate in any sessions at Grands Prix. Team Lotus hired him as a reserve and test driver for 2011, with his programme running parallel to his competing in the GP2 Series with Team AirAsia, which was run by Lotus' team principal Tony Fernandes. He took part in the first Free Practice session of the 2011 Chinese Grand Prix, and once again in the Young Driver test at the end of the 2011 season.

==== Marussia (2013) ====
Razia was set to make his competitive debut at the 2013 Australian Grand Prix, driving for Marussia, however he had issues with his funding and his contract was terminated. He was replaced by Jules Bianchi.

=== Indy Lights ===
In 2014, Razia raced in Indy Lights for Schmidt Peterson Motorsports. He scored one win and five podiums, finishing fifth in the overall standings.

=== Brazil ===
Razia competed as a guest driver in round 1 of the 2015 Stock Car Brasil, partnering with Lucas Foresti. He later drove a Toyota Corolla at the Brasileiro de Marcas for Bassani.

== Racing record ==
=== Career summary ===
Season	Series	Team	Races	Wins	Poles	F/Laps	Podiums	Points	Position
2005	South American Formula Three	Dragão Motorsport	18	2	2	4	6	52	6th
2005	Brazilian Formula Renault 2.0	Dragão Motorsport	13	0	0	0	0	68	10th
2006	South American Formula Three	Dragão Motorsport	16	7	6	7	11	99	**1st**
2006	F3000 International Masters	Charouz Racing System	3	3	0	2	3	30	8th
2007	Euroseries 3000	Fisichella Motor Sport	16	0	1	1	4	57	**3rd**
2007	Euroseries 3000	ELK Motorsport	16	0	1	1	4	57	**3rd**
2007	Italian Formula 3000	Fisichella Motor Sport	8	0	0	0	2	26	4th
2007	Italian Formula 3000	ELK Motorsport	8	0	0	0	2	26	4th
2007	Formula Renault 3.5 Series	GD Racing	4	0	0	0	0	0	38th
2008	Euroseries 3000	ELK Motorsport	13	2	1	1	5	52	4th
2008	Italian Formula 3000	ELK Motorsport	8	1	0	1	3	32	4th
2008–09	GP2 Asia Series	Trust Team Arden	11	1	0	0	1	9	13th
2009	GP2 Series	Fisichella Motor Sport	18	1	0	1	1	8	19th
2009	GP2 Series	Scuderia Coloni	18	1	0	1	1	8	19th
2009–10	GP2 Asia Series	Barwa Addax	4	0	0	0	0	0	26th
2009–10	GP2 Asia Series	Rapax Team	4	0	0	0	0	0	26th
2010	GP2 Series	Rapax	20	0	0	1	3	28	11th
2010	Formula One	Virgin Racing	Test driver						
2011	GP2 Series	Team AirAsia/Caterham Team AirAsia	18	0	1	0	2	19	12th
2011	GP2 Final	Caterham Team AirAsia	2	0	0	1	1	9	**3rd**
2011	GP2 Asia Series	Team AirAsia	4	0	0	0	0	0	25th
2011	Formula One	Team Lotus	Test driver						
2012	GP2 Series	Arden International	24	4	0	3	9	222	**2nd**
2013	Formula One	Marussia F1 Team	Pre-season test driver						
2013	International GT Open (GTS class)	Bhai Tech Racing	15	1	0	0	3	37	8th
2014	Indy Lights	Schmidt Peterson Motorsports	14	1	2	1	5	403	5th
2015	Stock Car Brasil	AMG Motorsport	1	0	0	0	0	0	NC†
2016	Stock Car Brasil	Full Time-ProGP	1	0	0	0	0	0	NC†

^{†} As Razia was a guest driver, he was ineligible for points.

=== Complete Formula Renault 3.5 Series results ===
(key) (Races in bold indicate pole position) (Races in italics indicate fastest lap)

Year	Team	1	2	3	4	5	6	7	8	9	10	11	12	13	14	15	16	17	Pos	Points
2007	GD Racing	MNZ; 1	MNZ; 2	NÜR; 1	NÜR; 2	MON; 1	HUN; 1	HUN; 2	SPA; 1	SPA; 2	DON; 1 Ret	DON; 2 Ret	MAG; 1 Ret	MAG; 2; 20	EST; 1	EST; 2	CAT; 1	CAT; 2	38th	0

=== Complete GP2 Series results ===
(key) (Races in bold indicate pole position) (Races in italics indicate fastest lap)

Year	Entrant	1	2	3	4	5	6	7	8	9	10	11	12	13	14	15	16	17	18	19	20	21	22	23	24	DC	Points
2009	FMSI	CAT; FEA; 16	CAT; SPR; 12	MON; FEA; 13	MON; SPR; 10	IST; FEA; Ret	IST; SPR; 20	SIL; FEA; 20	SIL; SPR; Ret	NÜR; FEA; Ret	NÜR; SPR; 14	HUN; FEA; Ret	HUN; SPR; Ret													19th	8
2009	PartyPokerRacing.com SC													VAL; FEA; Ret	VAL; SPR; 13	SPA; FEA	SPA; SPR	MNZ; FEA; 8	MNZ; SPR; 1	ALG; FEA; 10	ALG; SPR; 17					19th	8
2010	Rapax	CAT; FEA; 7	CAT; SPR; 2	MON; FEA; 7	MON; SPR; 5	IST; FEA; 5	IST; SPR; 2	VAL; FEA; Ret	VAL; SPR; Ret	SIL; FEA; Ret	SIL; SPR; 15	HOC; FEA; Ret	HOC; SPR; 13	HUN; FEA; 10	HUN; SPR; Ret	SPA; FEA; 16	SPA; SPR; 10	MNZ; FEA; Ret	MNZ; SPR; 10	YMC; FEA; 7	YMC; SPR; 2					11th	28
2011	Caterham Team AirAsia	IST; FEA; 6	IST; SPR; 18	CAT; FEA; Ret	CAT; SPR; Ret	MON; FEA; Ret	MON; SPR; 20	VAL; FEA; 6	VAL; SPR; 2	SIL; FEA; 17	SIL; SPR; 14	NÜR; FEA; Ret	NÜR; SPR; 14	**HUN**; **FEA**; 3	HUN; SPR; 7	SPA; FEA; Ret	SPA; SPR; Ret	MNZ; FEA; 10	MNZ; SPR; 9							12th	19
2012	Arden International	SEP; FEA; 1	SEP; SPR; 5	BHR1; FEA; 2	BHR1; SPR; 4	BHR2; FEA; 4	BHR2; SPR; 2	CAT; FEA; 8	CAT; SPR; 1	MON; FEA; 15	MON; SPR; 6	VAL; FEA; 3	VAL; SPR; 1	SIL; FEA; 5	SIL; SPR; 1	HOC; FEA; 7	HOC; SPR; 10	HUN; FEA; 3	HUN; SPR; 3	SPA; FEA; 6	SPA; SPR; 20	MNZ; FEA; Ret	MNZ; SPR; 16	MRN; FEA; 5	MRN; SPR; 4	**2nd**	**222**

==== Complete GP2 Asia Series results ====
(key) (Races in bold indicate pole position) (Races in italics indicate fastest lap)

Year	Entrant	1	2	3	4	5	6	7	8	9	10	11	12	DC	Points
2008–09	Trust Team Arden	SHI; FEA; Ret	SHI; SPR; 17	DUB; FEA; 10	DUB; SPR; C	BHR1; FEA; 14	BHR1; SPR; 9	LSL; FEA; 8	LSL; SPR; 6	SEP; FEA; Ret	SEP; SPR; Ret	BHR2; FEA; 8	BHR2; SPR; 1	13th	9
2009–10	Barwa Addax Team	YMC1; FEA; Ret	YMC1; SPR; 11	YMC2; FEA	YMC2; SPR	BHR1; FEA	BHR1; SPR							26th	0
2009–10	Rapax Team							BHR2; FEA; Ret	BHR2; SPR; 13					26th	0
2011	Team AirAsia	YMC; FEA; Ret	YMC; SPR; 16	IMO; FEA; Ret	IMO; SPR; 14									25th	0

==== Complete GP2 Final results ====
(key) (Races in bold indicate pole position) (Races in italics indicate fastest lap)

Year	Entrant	1	2	DC	Points
2011	Caterham Team AirAsia	YMC; FEA; 2	YMC; SPR; 8	3rd	9

=== Complete Formula One participations ===
(key) (Races in bold indicate pole position) (Races in italics indicate fastest lap)

Year	Entrant	Chassis	Engine	1	2	3	4	5	6	7	8	9	10	11	12	13	14	15	16	17	18	19	WDC	Points
2011	Team Lotus	Lotus T128	Renault RS27 2.4 V8	AUS	MAL	CHN; TD	TUR	ESP	MON	CAN	EUR	GBR	GER	HUN	BEL	ITA	SIN	JPN	KOR	IND	ABU	BRA; TD	–	–

=== American open-wheel racing results ===
(key) (Races in bold indicate pole position) (Races in italics indicate fastest lap)

==== Indy Lights ====
Year	Team	1	2	3	4	5	6	7	8	9	10	11	12	13	14	Rank	Points	Ref
2014	Schmidt Peterson Motorsports	STP; 5	LBH; 5	ALA; 2	ALA; 4	IND; 2	**IND**; 1	**INDY**; 4	POC; 8	TOR; 12	MOH; 3	MOH; 11	MIL; 8	SNM; 3	SNM; 4	**5th**	**403**	

Sporting positions
Preceded by Alberto Valerio	Formula Three Sudamericana; Champion; 2006	Succeeded by Clemente de Faria, Jr.
