= Ricardo Teixeira (racing driver) =

Portuguese-Angolan racing driver (born 1984)

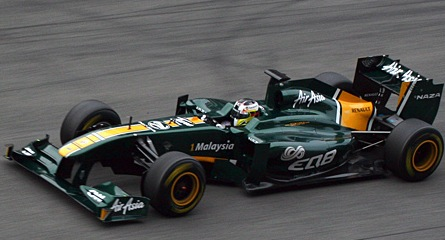
- Nationality: (Angola) Angolan (Portugal) Portuguese via dual nationality
- Born: 2 August 1984 (age 42) Lisbon, Portugal

GP2 Series
- Categorisation: FIA Silver (until 2013); FIA Gold (2014–)
- Years active: 2009, 2012–13
- Teams: Rapax, Trident Racing
- Car number: 20
- Starts: 42
- Wins: 0
- Poles: 0
- Fastest laps: 0
- Best finish: 26th in 2009

Previous series
- 2010 2008–09 2002, 2005–08 2007 2001: FIA Formula Two; GP2 Asia Series; British Formula 3 ATS Formel 3 Cup; FBMW Junior Cup Iberia

Ricardo Teixeira (born 2 August 1984 in Lisbon, Portugal) is an Angolan-Portuguese former racing driver. He holds dual nationality and has raced under both nationalities at various points in his career. He was the first Angolan driver to drive a Formula 1 car when he was announced as a test driver for Team Lotus for 2011. He has been sponsored throughout his career by the Angolan oil company Sonangol.

== Career ==
=== Formula BMW ===
Teixeira began his formula racing career in 2001 by driving in the Formula BMW Junior Cup in Portugal. He finished in 20th position in the drivers' championship.

=== Formula Three ===
Teixeira moved to the National Class of the British Formula 3 Championship in 2002, but did not start a race that year. In 2003, he raced occasionally in the BRSCC's ARP Formula Three Championship, taking one win and three podiums finish at club racing level.

Teixeira returned to the British Championship in 2005 after taking a couple of years out for study with the Carlin Motorsport team, finishing ninth in the National Class. The following season, he improved to seventh, despite switching teams to Performance Racing Europe part-way through the year finishing twice in the podium. In 2007, he moved up to the Championship Class of the series with Performance Racing, scoring no points. For 2008, he moved to the Ultimate Motorsport team's Mygale chassis. Teixeira also competed in two races of the German ATS Formel 3 Cup in 2007, and has driven in two Masters of Formula Three races, with a best finish of 24th.

=== GP2 Series ===
Teixeira was signed by the Trident Racing team to drive in the fifth and sixth rounds of the 2008–09 GP2 Asia Series season. He replaced Frankie Provenzano, and was the seventh competitor to drive one of the team's two entries. He was the first Angolan driver to compete at this level of motorsport. Trident kept a hold of Teixeira for the 2009 GP2 Series.

After two years away from the series, one in FIA Formula Two Championship and then as a test driver for the Lotus Formula One team, Teixeira returned to GP2 by signing with the Rapax team for the 2012 season, in which he partnered Tom Dillmann. After ten races, and with a best finish of 13th, he was replaced by Daniël de Jong after suffering from illness. He returned to action for the next round at Silverstone, with De Jong taking Dillmann's seat instead. Teixeira eventually finished 29th in the championship.

=== FIA Formula Two Championship ===
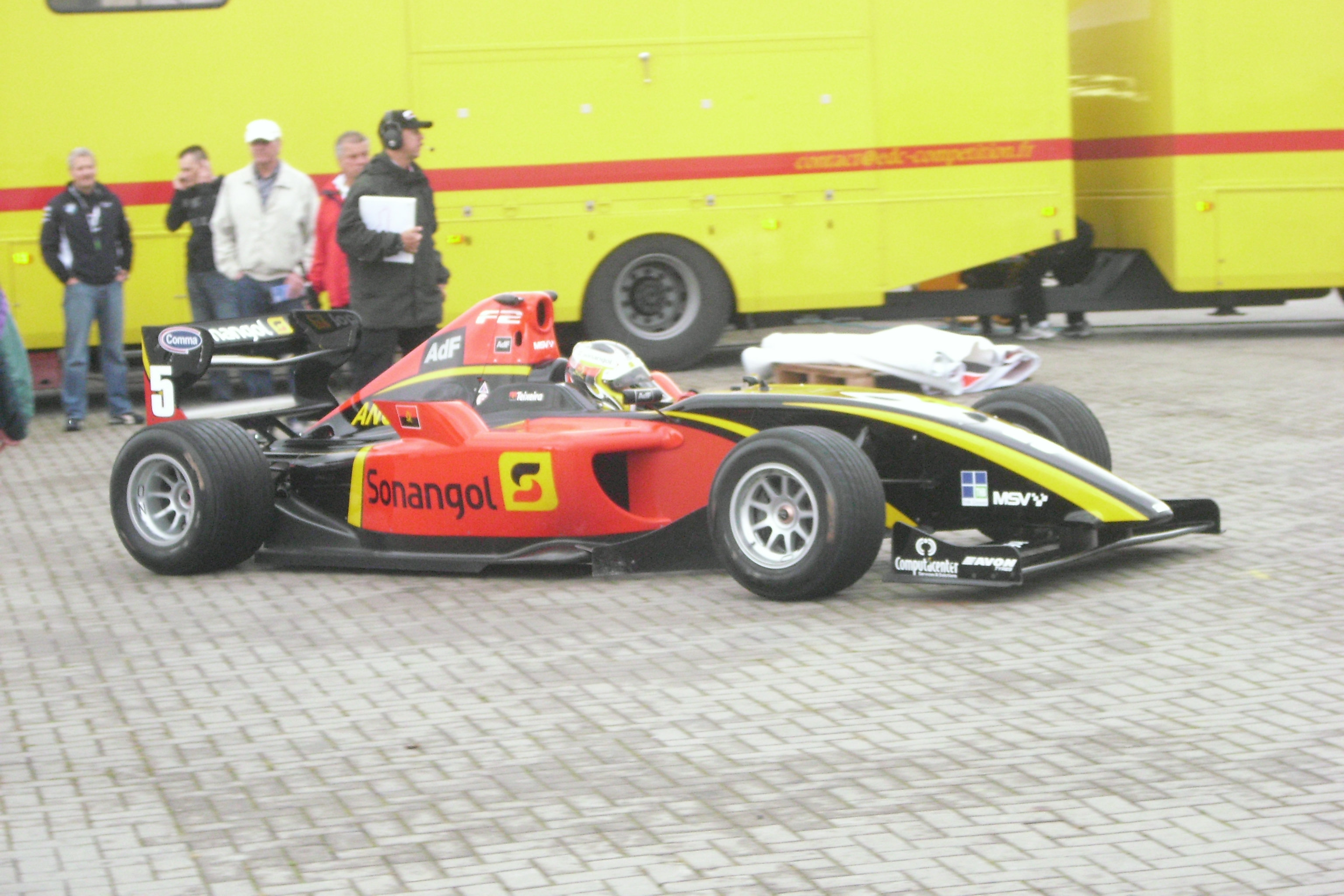
Teixeira at the Oschersleben round of the 2010 FIA Formula Two Championship.

Teixeira moved to the FIA Formula Two Championship for 2010. He finished fifth in his third race in the series, at Marrakech, but suffered a spectacular aerial accident in the following race when he collided with Ivan Samarin under braking for a chicane. Teixeira was uninjured in the accident. Over the course of the season, he amassed 23 points to finish 16th in the drivers' championship: his best showing in any series since 2006.

=== Formula One ===
After driving for Team Lotus in pre-season testing for the 2011 season, Teixeira was confirmed as a test driver for the team in March 2011.

=== GP2 again ===
In July 2013, Teixeira returned to the GP2 series in Hungary with the Trident team.

== Racing record ==
=== Career summary ===
Season	Series	Team	Races	Wins	Poles	F/Laps	Podiums	Points	Position
2001	Formula BMW Junior Cup Iberia		3	0	0	0	0	28	20th
2002	British Formula 3 Championship - Scholarship	Essential Motorsport	1	0	0	0	0	0	NC
2003	ARP Formula 3 Championship	Rowan Racing	5	2	1	2	4	47	8th
2005	British Formula 3 International Series - National	Carlin Motorsport	16	0	0	0	0	61	9th
2006	British Formula 3 International Series - National	Carlin Motorsport	14	0	0	1	2	74	7th
2006	British Formula 3 International Series - National	Performance Racing Europe	14	0	0	1	2	74	7th
2007	British Formula 3 International Series	Performance Racing Europe	18	0	0	0	0	0	20th
2007	ATS Formel 3 Cup	Rennsport Rössler	1	0	0	0	0	2	23rd
2007	Masters of Formula 3	Performance Racing Europe	1	0	0	0	0	N/A	24th
2008	British Formula 3 International Series	Ultimate Motorsport	20	0	0	0	0	0	21st
2008	Masters of Formula 3	Ultimate Motorsport	1	0	0	0	0	N/A	NC
2008–09	GP2 Asia Series	Trident Racing	4	0	0	0	0	0	38th
2009	GP2 Series	Trident Racing	18	0	0	0	0	0	26th
2010	Formula Two	MotorSport Vision	18	0	0	0	0	23	16th
2011	Formula One	Team Lotus	Test/reserve driver						
2012	GP2 Series	Rapax	22	0	0	0	0	0	29th
2013	GP2 Series	Trident Racing	4	0	0	0	0	0	34th
2014	Auto GP Series	Super Nova International	0	0	0	0	0	0	NC
2017	FRD LMP3 Series	Jackie Chan DC Racing Team	2	0	0	0	0	3	29th

=== Complete British Formula Three Championship results ===
(key) (Races in bold indicate pole position) (Races in italics indicate fastest lap)

Year	Entrant	Chassis	Engine	Class	1	2	3	4	5	6	7	8	9	10	11	12	13	14	15	16	17	18	19	20	21	22	23	24	25	26	DC	Points
2002	Essential Motorsport	Dallara F301	Toyota	S	BRH; 1	BRH; 2	DON; 1	DON; 2	SIL; 1	SIL; 2	KNO; 1	KNO; 2	CRO; 1 DNQ	CRO; 2 C	SIL; 1	SIL; 2	CAS; 1	CAS; 2	BRH; 1	BRH; 2	ROC; 1	ROC; 2	OUL; 1	OUL; 2	SNE; 1	SNE; 2	THR; 1	THR; 2	DON; 1	DON; 2	NC	0
2005	Carlin Motorsport	Dallara F304	Mugen-Honda	N	DON; 1; 21	DON; 2; 21	SPA; 1 C	SPA; 2 C	CRO; 1; 16	CRO; 2 Ret	KNO; 1; 17	KNO; 2; 17	THR; 1; 19	THR; 2; 19	CAS; 1; 23	CAS; 2; 21	MNZ; 1; 21	MNZ; 2; 24	MNZ; 3; 17	SIL; 1; 13	SIL; 2; 22	SIL; 3; 21	NÜR; 1	NÜR; 2	MON; 1	MON; 2	SIL; 1	SIL; 2			9th	61
2006	Carlin Motorsport	Dallara F304	Mugen-Honda	N	OUL; 1; 15	OUL; 2; 17	DON; 1; 17	DON; 2 Ret																							7th	74
2006	Performance Racing Europe	Dallara F304	Mugen-Honda	N					PAU; 1; 15	PAU; 2 Ret	MON; 1; 19	MON; 2 Ret	SNE; 1; 17	SNE; 2 Ret	SPA; 1; 21	SPA; 2; 20	SIL; 1 Ret	SIL; 2; 21	BRH; 1	BRH; 2	MUG; 1	MUG; 2	SIL; 1	SIL; 2	THR; 1	THR; 2					7th	74
2007	Performance Racing Europe	Dallara F307	Mugen-Honda	C	OUL; 1 Ret	OUL; 2; 19	DON; 1; 16	DON; 2; 15	BUC; 1; 21	BUC; 2; 17	SNE; 1; 16	SNE; 2; 17	MNZ; 1 Ret	MNZ; 2 Ret	BRH; 1; 15	BRH; 2; 15	SPA; 1; 24	SPA; 2 Ret	SIL; 1; 16	SIL; 2; 18	THR; 1 Ret	THR; 2; 15	CRO; 1 Ret	CRO; 2; 17	ROC; 1; 17	ROC; 2; 15					20th	0
2008	Ultimate Motorsport	Mygale M-08F3	Mercedes HWA	C	OUL; 1; 14	OUL; 2; 17	CRO; 1 Ret	CRO; 2 Ret	MNZ; 1 DSQ	MNZ; 2; 17	ROC; 1; 15	ROC; 2; 15	SNE; 1 Ret	SNE; 2; 19	THR; 1 Ret	THR; 2 Ret	BRH; 1; 13	BRH; 2 Ret	SPA; 1 Ret	SPA; 2; 18	SIL; 1 Ret	SIL; 2; 13	BUC; 1 Ret	BUC; 2 Ret	DON; 1	DON; 2					21st	0

=== Complete ATS Formel 3 Cup results ===
(key) (Races in bold indicate pole position) (Races in italics indicate fastest lap)

Year	Entrant	Chassis	Engine	1	2	3	4	5	6	7	8	9	10	11	12	13	14	15	16	17	18	DC	Points
2007	Rennsport Rössler	Dallara F305	Opel	HOC; 1	HOC; 2	OSC; 1	OSC; 2	NÜR; 1	NÜR; 2	NÜR; 1	NÜR; 2	LAU; 1	LAU; 2	ASS; 1	ASS; 2	ASS; 1; 14	ASS; 2; 11	SAC; 1	SAC; 2	OSC; 1	OSC; 2	23rd	0

=== Complete GP2 Series results ===
(key) (Races in bold indicate pole position) (Races in italics indicate fastest lap)

Year	Entrant	1	2	3	4	5	6	7	8	9	10	11	12	13	14	15	16	17	18	19	20	21	22	23	24	DC	Points
2009	Trident Racing	CAT; FEA; Ret	CAT; SPR; 20	MON; FEA; DNQ	MON; SPR; DNQ	IST; FEA; 14	IST; SPR; 18	SIL; FEA; Ret	SIL; SPR; 18	NÜR; FEA; Ret	NÜR; SPR; 15	HUN; FEA; Ret	HUN; SPR; 19	VAL; FEA; Ret	VAL; SPR; 14	SPA; FEA; Ret	SPA; SPR; 14	MNZ; FEA; 16	MNZ; SPR; 14	ALG; FEA; 15	ALG; SPR; 21					26th	0
2012	Rapax	SEP; FEA; 21	SEP; SPR; 24	BHR1; FEA; 17	BHR1; SPR; 13	BHR2; FEA; 23	BHR2; SPR; 20	CAT; FEA; Ret	CAT; SPR; 23	MON; FEA; 20	MON; SPR; Ret	VAL; FEA	VAL; SPR	SIL; FEA; 18	SIL; SPR; 15	HOC; FEA; DSQ	HOC; SPR; 16	HUN; FEA; 19	HUN; SPR; 20	SPA; FEA; 18	SPA; SPR; 15	MNZ; FEA; 20	MNZ; SPR; 18	MRN; FEA; 17	MRN; SPR; 21	29th	0
2013	Trident Racing	SEP; FEA	SEP; SPR	BHR; FEA	BHR; SPR	CAT; FEA	CAT; SPR	MON; FEA	MON; SPR	SIL; FEA	SIL; SPR	NÜR; FEA	NÜR; SPR	HUN; FEA; 19	HUN; SPR; 19	SPA; FEA; 21	SPA; SPR; 24	MNZ; FEA	MNZ; SPR	MRN; FEA	MRN; SPR	YMC; FEA	YMC; SPR			34th	0

==== Complete GP2 Asia Series results ====
(key) (Races in bold indicate pole position) (Races in italics indicate fastest lap)

Year	Entrant	1	2	3	4	5	6	7	8	9	10	11	12	DC	Points
2008–09	Trident Racing	SHI; FEA	SHI; SPR	DUB; FEA	DUB; SPR	BHR1; FEA	BHR1; SPR	LSL; FEA	LSL; SPR	SEP; FEA; 17	SEP; SPR; 19	BHR2; FEA; 17	BHR2; SPR; Ret	38th	0

=== Complete FIA Formula Two Championship results ===
(key) (Races in bold indicate pole position) (Races in italics indicate fastest lap)

Year	1	2	3	4	5	6	7	8	9	10	11	12	13	14	15	16	17	18	DC	Points
2010	SIL; 1; 17	SIL; 2; 14	MAR; 1; 5	MAR; 2 Ret	MON; 1; 16	MON; 2; 13	ZOL; 1; 9	ZOL; 2 Ret	ALG; 1; 6	ALG; 2 Ret	BRH; 1; 16	BRH; 2; 16	BRN; 1; 9	BRN; 2 Ret	OSC; 1; 10	OSC; 2; 16	VAL; 1; 14	VAL; 2 Ret	16th	23

=== Complete Auto GP results ===
(key) (Races in bold indicate pole position) (Races in italics indicate fastest lap)

Year	Entrant	1	2	3	4	5	6	7	8	9	10	11	12	13	14	15	16	Pos	Points
2014	Super Nova International	MAR; 1	MAR; 2	LEC; 1 WD	LEC; 2 WD	HUN; 1	HUN; 2	MNZ; 1	MNZ; 2	IMO; 1	IMO; 2	RBR; 1	RBR; 2	NÜR; 1	NÜR; 2	EST; 1	EST; 2	NC	0
