= 2014 Monza GP2 Series round =

Motor racing competition

(Italy) 2014 Monza GP2 round
Round details
- Round 9 of 11 rounds in the 2014 GP2 Series
- Layout of the Autodromo Nazionale Monza
- Location: Autodromo Nazionale Monza, Monza, Italy
- Course: Permanent racing facility 5.793 km (3.600 mi)

GP2 Series

Feature race
- Date: 6 September 2014
- Laps: 30

Pole position
Driver	(Belgium) Stoffel Vandoorne	ART Grand Prix
- Time: 1:31.707

Podium
First	(Belgium) Stoffel Vandoorne	ART Grand Prix
Second	(France) Arthur Pic	Campos Racing
Third	(New Zealand) Mitch Evans	Russian Time

Fastest lap
Driver	(Colombia) Julián Leal	Carlin
- Time: 1:33.473 (on lap 30)

Sprint race
- Date: 7 September 2014
- Laps: 21

Podium
First	(United Kingdom) Jolyon Palmer	DAMS
Second	(Monaco) Stefano Coletti	Racing Engineering
Third	(Monaco) Stéphane Richelmi	DAMS

Fastest lap
Driver	(Monaco) Stefano Coletti	Racing Engineering
- Time: 1:33.258 (on lap 17)

The 2014 Monza GP2 Series round was a GP2 Series motor race held on September 6 and 7, 2014 at Autodromo Nazionale Monza, Italy. It was the ninth round of the 2014 GP2 Series. The race supported the 2014 Italian Grand Prix.

== Classification ==
=== Qualifying ===
Pos.	No.	Driver	Team	Time	Grid
1	10	(Belgium) Stoffel Vandoorne	ART Grand Prix	1:31.707	1
2	26	(France) Arthur Pic	Campos Racing	1:31.926	2
3	1	(New Zealand) Mitch Evans	Russian Time	1:31.934	3
4	7	(United Kingdom) Jolyon Palmer	DAMS	1:32.010	26
5	5	(Italy) Raffaele Marciello	Racing Engineering	1:32.124	4
6	15	(Switzerland) Simon Trummer	Rapax	1:32.137	5
7	8	(Monaco) Stéphane Richelmi	DAMS	1:32.150	6
8	3	(Brazil) Felipe Nasr	Carlin	1:32.310	7
9	4	(Colombia) Julián Leal	Carlin	1:32.343	8
10	17	(Brazil) André Negrão	Arden International	1:32.354	9
11	18	(Indonesia) Rio Haryanto	Caterham Racing	1:32.361	10
12	11	(Germany) Daniel Abt	Hilmer Motorsport	1:32.385	11
13	6	(Monaco) Stefano Coletti	Racing Engineering	1:32.412	12
14	27	(Japan) Kimiya Satō	Campos Racing	1:32.413	13
15	21	(Denmark) Marco Sørensen	MP Motorsport	1:32.419	14
16	12	(United Kingdom) Jon Lancaster	Hilmer Motorsport	1:32.422	15
17	9	(Japan) Takuya Izawa	ART Grand Prix	1:32.435	16
18	20	(Netherlands) Daniël de Jong	MP Motorsport	1:32.473	17
19	16	(Austria) René Binder	Arden International	1:32.483	18
20	14	(United Kingdom) Adrian Quaife-Hobbs	Rapax	1:32.486	19
21	23	(Venezuela) Johnny Cecotto Jr.	Trident	1:32.533	23
22	22	(Spain) Sergio Canamasas	Trident	1:32.624	20
23	19	(France) Pierre Gasly	Caterham Racing	1:32.826	21
24	2	(Russia) Artem Markelov	Russian Time	1:32.881	22
25	24	(France) Nathanaël Berthon	Venezuela GP Lazarus	1:32.912	24
26	25	(Italy) Sergio Campana	Venezuela GP Lazarus	1:33.409	25

=== Feature race ===
Pos.	No.	Driver	Team	Laps	Time/Retired	Grid	Points
1	10	(Belgium) Stoffel Vandoorne	ART Grand Prix	30	48:02.203	1	25+4
2	26	(France) Arthur Pic	Campos Racing	30	+0.673	2	18
3	1	(New Zealand) Mitch Evans	Russian Time	30	+4.102	3	15
4	8	(Monaco) Stéphane Richelmi	DAMS	30	+9.502	6	12
5	17	(Brazil) André Negrão	Arden International	30	+11.140	9	10
6	3	(Brazil) Felipe Nasr	Carlin	30	+11.605	7	8
7	21	(Denmark) Marco Sørensen	MP Motorsport	30	+14.458	14	6
8	7	(United Kingdom) Jolyon Palmer	DAMS	30	+15.049	26	4+2
9	6	(Monaco) Stefano Coletti	Racing Engineering	30	+16.704	12	2
10	23	(Venezuela) Johnny Cecotto Jr.	Trident	30	+25.885	23	1
11	12	(United Kingdom) Jon Lancaster	Hilmer Motorsport	30	+29.125	15	
12	24	(France) Nathanaël Berthon	Venezuela GP Lazarus	30	+29.928	24	
13	4	(Colombia) Julián Leal	Carlin	30	+44.529	8	
14	14	(United Kingdom) Adrian Quaife-Hobbs	Rapax	30	+45.885	19	
15	25	(Italy) Sergio Campana	Venezuela GP Lazarus	30	+49.032	25	
16	18	(Indonesia) Rio Haryanto	Caterham Racing	30	+57.081	10	
17	19	(France) Pierre Gasly	Caterham Racing	30	+57.868	21	
18	22	(Spain) Sergio Canamasas	Trident	30	+1:10.746	20	
19	15	(Switzerland) Simon Trummer	Rapax	30	+1:10.746	5	
20	16	(Austria) René Binder	Arden International	30	+1:13.478	18	
21	2	(Russia) Artem Markelov	Russian Time	29	+1 lap	22	
Ret	11	(Germany) Daniel Abt	Hilmer Motorsport	18	Retired	11	
Ret	9	(Japan) Takuya Izawa	ART Grand Prix	1	Retired	16	
Ret	5	(Italy) Raffaele Marciello	Racing Engineering	1	Retired	4	
Ret	27	(Japan) Kimiya Satō	Campos Racing	1	Retired	13	
Ret	20	(Netherlands) Daniël de Jong	MP Motorsport	1	Retired	17	

=== Sprint race ===
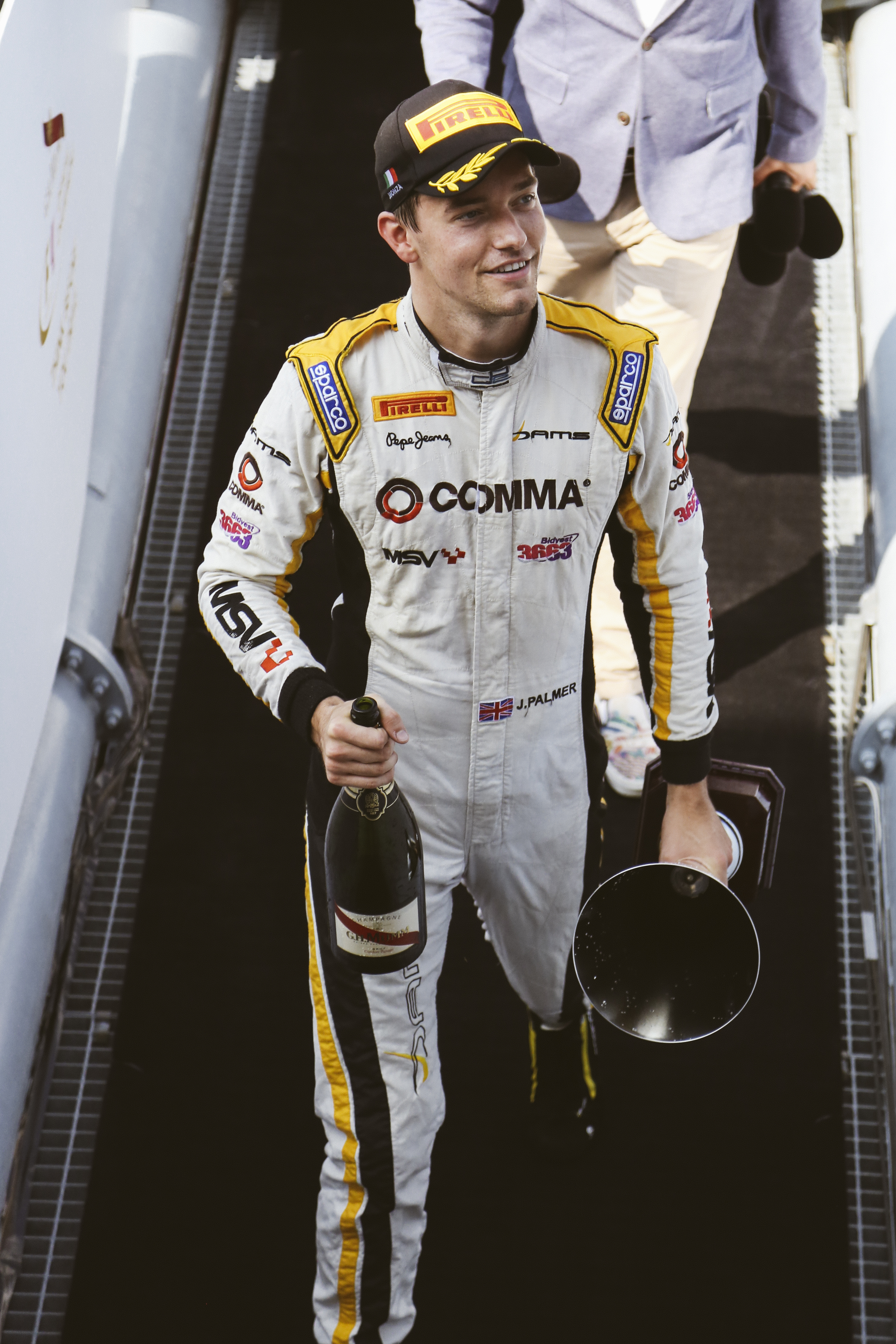
Jolyon Palmer podium.

Pos.	No.	Driver	Team	Laps	Time/Retired	Grid	Points
1	7	(United Kingdom) Jolyon Palmer	DAMS	21	36:38.991	1	15
2	6	(Monaco) Stefano Coletti	Racing Engineering	21	+1.501	9	12+2
3	8	(Monaco) Stéphane Richelmi	DAMS	21	+3.024	5	10
4	21	(Denmark) Marco Sørensen	MP Motorsport	21	+4.881	2	8
5	17	(Brazil) André Negrão	Arden International	21	+7.980	4	6
6	3	(Brazil) Felipe Nasr	Carlin	21	+10.602	3	4
7	26	(France) Arthur Pic	Campos Racing	21	+11.238	7	2
8	14	(United Kingdom) Adrian Quaife-Hobbs	Rapax	21	+12.453	14	1
9	20	(Netherlands) Daniël de Jong	MP Motorsport	21	+16.157	26	
10	11	(Germany) Daniel Abt	Hilmer Motorsport	21	+20.311	22	
11	15	(Switzerland) Simon Trummer	Rapax	21	+21.036	19	
12	27	(Japan) Kimiya Satō	Campos Racing	21	+22.906	25	
13	10	(Belgium) Stoffel Vandoorne	ART Grand Prix	21	+23.187	8	
14	9	(Japan) Takuya Izawa	ART Grand Prix	21	+26.461	23	
15	12	(United Kingdom) Jon Lancaster	Hilmer Motorsport	21	+28.448	11	
16	18	(Indonesia) Rio Haryanto	Caterham Racing	21	+31.247	16	
17	4	(Colombia) Julián Leal	Carlin	21	+38.858	13	
18	5	(Italy) Raffaele Marciello	Racing Engineering	20	+1 lap	24	
19	24	(France) Nathanaël Berthon	Venezuela GP Lazarus	19	+2 laps	12	
20	1	(New Zealand) Mitch Evans	Russian Time	19	+2 laps	6	
Ret	16	(Austria) René Binder	Arden International	9	Retired	20	
Ret	25	(Italy) Sergio Campana	Venezuela GP Lazarus	5	Retired	15	
Ret	19	(France) Pierre Gasly	Caterham Racing	0	Retired	17	
Ret	23	(Venezuela) Johnny Cecotto Jr.	Trident	0	Retired	10	
Ret	2	(Russia) Artem Markelov	Russian Time	0	Retired	21	
DSQ	22	(Spain) Sergio Canamasas	Trident	15	Disqualified	18	

== See also ==
- 2014 Italian Grand Prix
- 2014 Monza GP3 Series round

Previous round: 2014 Spa-Francorchamps GP2 Series round	GP2 Series; 2014 season	Next round: 2014 Sochi GP2 Series round
Previous round: 2013 Monza GP2 Series round	Monza GP2 round	Next round: 2015 Monza GP2 Series round
