= 2014 Yas Marina GP2 Series round =

Car racing competition

(United Arab Emirates) 2014 Yas Marina GP2 round
Round details
- Round 11 of 11 rounds in the 2014 GP2 Series
- Layout of the Yas Marina Circuit
- Location: Yas Marina Circuit, Abu Dhabi, United Arab Emirates
- Course: Permanent racing facility 5.554 km (3.451 mi)

GP2 Series

Feature race
- Date: 21 November 2014
- Laps: 31

Pole position
Driver	(Belgium) Stoffel Vandoorne	ART Grand Prix
- Time: 1:48.088

Podium
First	(Belgium) Stoffel Vandoorne	ART Grand Prix
Second	(United Kingdom) Jolyon Palmer	DAMS
Third	(New Zealand) Mitch Evans	Russian Time

Fastest lap
Driver	(United Kingdom) Jolyon Palmer	DAMS
- Time: 1:51.185 (on lap 24)

Sprint race
- Date: 22 November 2014
- Laps: 22

Podium
First	(Monaco) Stefano Coletti	Racing Engineering
Second	(Brazil) Felipe Nasr	Carlin
Third	(France) Arthur Pic	Campos Racing

Fastest lap
Driver	(Belgium) Stoffel Vandoorne	ART Grand Prix
- Time: 1:52.088 (on lap 16)

The 2014 Yas Marina GP2 Series round was a GP2 Series motor race held on November 21 and 22, 2014 at Yas Marina Circuit, Abu Dhabi. It was the last round of the 2014 GP2 Series. The race supported the 2014 Abu Dhabi Grand Prix.

== Classification ==
=== Qualifying ===
Pos.	No.	Driver	Team	Time	Grid
1	10	(Belgium) Stoffel Vandoorne	ART Grand Prix	1:48.088	1
2	7	(United Kingdom) Jolyon Palmer	DAMS	1:48.187	2
3	8	(Monaco) Stéphane Richelmi	DAMS	1:48.374	3
4	1	(New Zealand) Mitch Evans	Russian Time	1:48.709	4
5	3	(Brazil) Felipe Nasr	Carlin	1:48.873	5
6	19	(France) Pierre Gasly	Caterham Racing	1:48.973	6
7	26	(France) Arthur Pic	Campos Racing	1:48.985	7
8	5	(Italy) Raffaele Marciello	Racing Engineering	1:49.023	13
9	6	(Monaco) Stefano Coletti	Racing Engineering	1:49.326	8
10	18	(Indonesia) Rio Haryanto	Caterham Racing	1:49.338	9
11	4	(Colombia) Julián Leal	Carlin	1:49.395	10
12	23	(Venezuela) Johnny Cecotto Jr.	Trident	1:49.430	11
13	9	(Japan) Takuya Izawa	ART Grand Prix	1:49.500	12
14	22	(Spain) Sergio Canamasas	Trident	1:49.505	14
15	24	(France) Nathanaël Berthon	Venezuela GP Lazarus	1:49.518	15
16	27	(Japan) Kimiya Satō	Campos Racing	1:49.618	16
17	20	(Netherlands) Daniël de Jong	MP Motorsport	1:49.667	17
18	11	(Canada) Nicholas Latifi	Hilmer Motorsport	1:49.676	18
19	17	(Brazil) André Negrão	Arden International	1:49.677	19
20	25	(United States) Conor Daly	Venezuela GP Lazarus	1:49.721	20
21	16	(Austria) René Binder	Arden International	1:49.721	21
22	21	(Denmark) Marco Sørensen	MP Motorsport	1:49.736	22
23	15	(Switzerland) Simon Trummer	Rapax	1:49.794	23
24	12	(United Kingdom) Jon Lancaster	Hilmer Motorsport	1:49.885	24
25	14	(Italy) Kevin Giovesi	Rapax	1:50.012	25
26	2	(Russia) Artem Markelov	Russian Time	1:50.414	26

=== Feature race ===
Pos.	No.	Driver	Team	Laps	Time/Retired	Grid	Points
1	10	(Belgium) Stoffel Vandoorne	ART Grand Prix	31	1:00.56.725	1	25+4
2	7	(United Kingdom) Jolyon Palmer	DAMS	31	+12.157	2	18+2
3	1	(New Zealand) Mitch Evans	Russian Time	31	+19.159	4	15
4	3	(Brazil) Felipe Nasr	Carlin	31	+22.205	5	12
5	8	(Monaco) Stéphane Richelmi	DAMS	31	+28.099	3	10
6	23	(Venezuela) Johnny Cecotto Jr.	Trident	31	+34.254	11	8
7	6	(Monaco) Stefano Coletti	Racing Engineering	31	+34.254	8	6
8	26	(France) Arthur Pic	Campos Racing	31	+34.499	7	4
9	18	(Indonesia) Rio Haryanto	Caterham Racing	31	+36.797	9	2
10	20	(Netherlands) Daniël de Jong	MP Motorsport	31	+46.613	16	1
11	5	(Italy) Raffaele Marciello	Racing Engineering	31	+47.586	18	
12	4	(Colombia) Julián Leal	Carlin	31	+50.140	10	
13	9	(Japan) Takuya Izawa	ART Grand Prix	31	+54.585	12	
14	27	(Japan) Kimiya Satō	Campos Racing	31	+57.199	15	
15	24	(France) Nathanaël Berthon	Venezuela GP Lazarus	31	+1:05.269	14	
16	22	(Spain) Sergio Canamasas	Trident	31	+1:08.362	13	
17	15	(Switzerland) Simon Trummer	Rapax	31	+1:12.621	23	
18	12	(United Kingdom) Jon Lancaster	Hilmer Motorsport	31	+1:19.605	24	
19	14	(Italy) Kevin Giovesi	Rapax	31	+1:19.877	25	
20	25	(United States) Conor Daly	Venezuela GP Lazarus	31	+1:25.909	20	
21	19	(France) Pierre Gasly	Caterham Racing	31	+1:26.649	6	
22	11	(Canada) Nicholas Latifi	Hilmer Motorsport	31	+1:32.065	17	
Ret	2	(Russia) Artem Markelov	Russian Time	16	Retired	26	
Ret	17	(Brazil) André Negrão	Arden International	9	Retired	19	
Ret	21	(Denmark) Marco Sørensen	MP Motorsport	7	Retired	22	
Ret	16	(Austria) René Binder	Arden International	0	Retired	21	

=== Sprint race ===
Pos.	No.	Driver	Team	Laps	Time/Retired	Grid	Points
1	6	(Monaco) Stefano Coletti	Racing Engineering	22	41:37.752	2	15
2	3	(Brazil) Felipe Nasr	Carlin	22	+3.787	5	12
3	26	(France) Arthur Pic	Campos Racing	22	+5.357	1	10
4	1	(New Zealand) Mitch Evans	Russian Time	22	+12.701	6	8
5	10	(Belgium) Stoffel Vandoorne	ART Grand Prix	22	+13.764	8	6+2
6	23	(Venezuela) Johnny Cecotto Jr.	Trident	22	+18.708	3	4
7	5	(Italy) Raffaele Marciello	Racing Engineering	22	+19.217	11	2
8	22	(Spain) Sergio Canamasas	Trident	22	+24.383	16	1
9	8	(Monaco) Stéphane Richelmi	DAMS	22	+29.288	4	
10	9	(Japan) Takuya Izawa	ART Grand Prix	22	+29.345	13	
11	4	(Colombia) Julián Leal	Carlin	22	+29.608	12	
12	18	(Indonesia) Rio Haryanto	Caterham Racing	22	+30.191	9	
13	24	(France) Nathanaël Berthon	Venezuela GP Lazarus	22	+30.561	15	
14	12	(United Kingdom) Jon Lancaster	Hilmer Motorsport	22	+36.411	18	
15	25	(United States) Conor Daly	Venezuela GP Lazarus	22	+36.817	20	
16	15	(Switzerland) Simon Trummer	Rapax	22	+37.962	17	
17	11	(Canada) Nicholas Latifi	Hilmer Motorsport	22	+41.580	22	
18	19	(France) Pierre Gasly	Caterham Racing	22	+42.156	21	
19	2	(Russia) Artem Markelov	Russian Time	22	+44.492	23	
20	14	(Italy) Kevin Giovesi	Rapax	22	+46.210	19	
21	21	(Denmark) Marco Sørensen	MP Motorsport	22	+47.308	25	
22	27	(Japan) Kimiya Satō	Campos Racing	22	+47.687	14	
23	16	(Austria) René Binder	Arden International	22	+48.331	26	
24	17	(Brazil) André Negrão	Arden International	22	+53.145	24	
Ret	7	(United Kingdom) Jolyon Palmer	DAMS	0	Retired	7	
Ret	20	(Netherlands) Daniël de Jong	MP Motorsport	0	Retired	26	

== See also ==
- 2014 Abu Dhabi Grand Prix
- 2014 Yas Marina GP3 Series round

Previous round: 2014 Sochi GP2 Series round	GP2 Series; 2014 season	Next round: 2015 Bahrain GP2 Series round
Previous round: 2013 Yas Marina GP2 Series round	Yas Marina GP2 round	Next round: 2015 Yas Marina GP2 Series round
