= British Racing and Sports Car Club =

- Sport: Motor Racing
- Official website: brscc.co.uk

History
- Year of formation: 1946
- Former names: 500 Club; Half-Litre Club

Officials
- Chair: Peter Daly
- Vice Presidents: Nigel Mansell CBE; Derek Bell MBE; Nick Tandy; Stuart Turner
- Chief Operations Officer: Paul McErlean

Regions
- East Anglia; Midlands; North Western; Southern

The British Racing and Sports Car Club (BRSCC) is one of the major organisers of motorsport events in the United Kingdom. It is currently based in Wheatley, Oxfordshire, United Kingdom. The club currently runs around thirty circuit racing championships for cars as diverse as Citroën, BMWs and Mazda. Formed in Bristol in August 1946 as the 500 Club, the organisation changed its name to the BRSCC in 1954 and now has its headquarters in Wheatley, Oxford.

== History ==
The 500 Club, as it was then known, was founded in 1946. The club promoted racing in 500 c.c. single-seater racing cars, later known as Formula Three. Motor Sport reported in 1947: "The 500 Club's Patron is Earl Howe, its President S.C.H. Davis, and its Vice-Presidents Messrs. Findon, Mays and Pomeroy-which speaks for itself. A stall will be occupied by the Club at the next Shelsley Walsh hill-climb, and its magazine "Iota" will be on sale there." The name was subsequently changed to The Half Litre Club on becoming a limited liability Company.

In 1954 Motor Sport reported: "The Half-Litre C.C. is contemplating changing its name to the British Racing and Sports-Car Club, in view of changed activities."

In 1966 the BRSCC staged the seventh Racing Car Show, 19–29 January, at Olympia West Hall, London. By this time the club magazine was called Motor Racing.

In 2025, the British Racing & Sports Car Club (BRSCC) organised over 35 race meetings across venues including Brands Hatch, Donington Park, and Silverstone. The club's calendar encompassed events ranging from club-level competition to national and international championships, reflecting its broad role within British motorsport.

== Championships organised by BRSCC ==
=== British GT and support series ===
- British GT Championship
- Ginetta GT5 Challenge (Currently known as Protyre Motorsport Ginetta GT Championship)
- Ginetta GT Academy
- Ginetta Junior Championship

=== BRSCC card ===
Note: this card may be combined at larger festival weekends or split over multiple weekends.

- Fiesta ST240 Championship
- BRSCC Fiesta Junior Championship
- BRSCC Mazda MX-5 MK4 Trophy
- Mazda MX-5 Clubman Championship
- Mazda MX-5 Supercup
- Audi TT Cup Racing Championship
- Fun Cup Championship
- Super Classic Pre ’99 Formula Ford Championship
- MG Metro Cup
- Mazda MX-5 Championship
- BMW Supercup Championship
- City Car Cup Championship
- Supersport Endurance Cup
- Classic VW Cup
- Silverlake C1 Endurance Series
- ClubSport Trophy
- Fiesta ST150 Challenge
- Fix-A-Wheel Production Cup
- MG Cockshoot Cup
- Silverlake DS3 Cup

=== Other series and festival events ===
- BRSCC 24Hour Event
- Formula Ford Festival
- BRSCC Fiesta Junior Scholarship
- Driven by Racing
- European Le Mans Series
- HRDC
- Mini 7 Racing Club
- Modified Ford Series
- Student Motorsport
- Race of Remembrance

=== Historical ===
BRSCC were the nominated organising body for these events until the year given.

- Avon Tyres National Formula Ford Championship
- Caterham Academy Championship
- Caterham Roadsport Championship
- Caterham Seven 270R Championship
- Caterham Seven 310R Championship
- Caterham Seven UK Championship
- Ford F4 British Championship
- BRSCC Modified Saloon Car Championship
- TCR UK Touring Car Championship
- Teekay Couplings Production GTi Championship
- Thundersaloon Series
- Thundersports Series
- Volkswagen Racing Cup
- W Series
- Zeo Prototype Series

== See also ==
- Motorsport in the United Kingdom
