= 2013 Spa-Francorchamps GP2 Series round =

Motor race held in Belgium

(Belgium) 2013 Spa-Francorchamps GP2 round
Round details
- Round 8 of 11 rounds in the 2013 GP2 Series
- Layout of the Circuit de Spa-Francorchamps
- Location: Circuit de Spa-Francorchamps, Francorchamps, Wallonia, Belgium
- Course: Permanent racing facility 7.004 km (4.352 mi)

GP2 Series

Feature race
- Date: 24 August 2013
- Laps: 25

Pole position
Driver	(United Kingdom) Sam Bird	Russian Time
- Time: 1:56.957

Podium
First	(United Kingdom) Sam Bird	Russian Time
Second	(Sweden) Marcus Ericsson	DAMS
Third	(United States) Alexander Rossi	Caterham Racing

Fastest lap
Driver	(France) Tom Dillmann	Russian Time
- Time: 1:59.644 (on lap 19)

Sprint race
- Date: 25 August 2013
- Laps: 18

Podium
First	(United Kingdom) James Calado	ART Grand Prix
Second	(Colombia) Julián Leal	Racing Engineering
Third	(United Kingdom) Adrian Quaife-Hobbs	Hilmer Motorsport

Fastest lap
Driver	(United Kingdom) James Calado	ART Grand Prix
- Time: 2:00.298 (on lap 3)

The 2013 Spa-Francorchamps GP2 Series round was a GP2 Series motor race held on August 24 and 25, 2013 at Circuit de Spa-Francorchamps, Belgium. It was the eighth round of the 2013 GP2 Series. The race supported the 2013 Belgian Grand Prix.

== Classification ==
=== Qualifying ===
Pos.	No.	Driver	Team	Time	Grid
1	11	(United Kingdom) Sam Bird	Russian Time	1:56.957	1
2	8	(Switzerland) Fabio Leimer	Racing Engineering	1:57.156	2
3	3	(United Kingdom) James Calado	ART Grand Prix	1:57.404	3
4	1	(Sweden) Marcus Ericsson	DAMS	1:57.538	4
5	15	(United States) Alexander Rossi	Caterham Racing	1:57.578	5
6	20	(France) Nathanael Berthon	Trident Racing	1:57.588	6
7	10	(United Kingdom) Jolyon Palmer	Carlin	1:57.691	7
8	2	(Monaco) Stephane Richelmi	DAMS	1:57.802	8
9	14	(Spain) Sergio Canamasas	Caterham Racing	1:57.804	19
10	9	(Brazil) Felipe Nasr	Carlin	1:57.839	9
11	23	(Netherlands) Robin Frijns	Hilmer Motorsport	1:57.881	10
12	7	(Colombia) Julián Leal	Racing Engineering	1:57.924	11
13	12	(France) Tom Dillmann	Russian Time	1:57.950	12
14	6	(New Zealand) Mitch Evans	Arden International	1:58.271	13
15	19	(Switzerland) Simon Trummer	Rapax	1:58.384	14
16	26	(Spain) Dani Clos	MP Motorsport	1:58.385	15
17	5	(Venezuela) Johnny Cecotto Jr.	Arden International	1:58.419	16
18	17	(Indonesia) Rio Haryanto	Barwa Addax Team	1:58.463	17
19	22	(United Kingdom) Adrian Quaife-Hobbs	Hilmer Motorsport	1:58.534	18
20	18	(Monaco) Stefano Coletti	Rapax	1:58.618	20
21	27	(Netherlands) Daniel de Jong	MP Motorsport	1:58.789	21
22	24	(Austria) Rene Binder	Venezuela GP Lazarus	1:58.803	22
23	25	(Italy) Vittorio Ghirelli	Venezuela GP Lazarus	1:58.831	23
24	4	(Germany) Daniel Abt	ART Grand Prix	1:59.022	24
25	16	(United States) Jake Rosenzweig	Barwa Addax Team	1:59.253	25
26	21	(Portugal) Ricardo Teixeira	Trident Racing	2:17.528	26

=== Feature race ===
Pos.	No.	Driver	Team	Laps	Time/Retired	Grid	Points
1	11	(United Kingdom) Sam Bird	Russian Time	25	52:55.642	1	25+4
2	1	(Sweden) Marcus Ericsson	DAMS	25	+7.001	4	18
3	15	(United States) Alexander Rossi	Caterham Racing	25	+8.242	5	15
4	8	(Switzerland) Fabio Leimer	Racing Engineering	25	+13.950	2	12
5	12	(France) Tom Dillmann	Russian Time	25	+15.353	12	10+2
6	7	(Colombia) Julián Leal	Racing Engineering	25	+18.643	11	8
7	2	(Monaco) Stephane Richelmi	DAMS	25	+26.086	8	6
8	3	(United Kingdom) James Calado	ART Grand Prix	25	+27.559	3	4
9	23	(Netherlands) Robin Frijns	Hilmer Motorsport	25	+28.425	10	2
10	22	(United Kingdom) Adrian Quaife-Hobbs	Hilmer Motorsport	25	+30.497	18	1
11	6	(New Zealand) Mitch Evans	Arden International	25	+33.190	13	
12	19	(Switzerland) Simon Trummer	Rapax	25	+33.341	14	
13	18	(Monaco) Stefano Coletti	Rapax	25	+33.837	20	
14	5	(Venezuela) Johnny Cecotto Jr.	Arden International	25	+48.970	16	
15	10	(United Kingdom) Jolyon Palmer	Carlin	25	+49.347	7	
16	4	(Germany) Daniel Abt	ART Grand Prix	25	+52.471	24	
17	16	(United States) Jake Rosenzweig	Barwa Addax Team	25	+57.102	25	
18	25	(Italy) Vittorio Ghirelli	Venezuela GP Lazarus	25	+57.982	23	
19	17	(Indonesia) Rio Haryanto	Barwa Addax Team	25	+1:03.628	17	
20	26	(Spain) Dani Clos	MP Motorsport	25	+1:20.316	15	
21	21	(Portugal) Ricardo Teixeira	Trident Racing	25	+1:27.365	26	
22	20	(France) Nathanael Berthon	Trident Racing	25	+1:28.885	6	
Ret	14	(Spain) Sergio Canamasas	Caterham Racing	19	Retired	19	
Ret	9	(Brazil) Felipe Nasr	Carlin	5	Retired	9	
Ret	27	(Netherlands) Daniel de Jong	MP Motorsport	3	Retired	21	
DNS	24	(Austria) Rene Binder	Venezuela GP Lazarus	0	Did not start		
Fastest lap: Tom Dillmann (Russian Time) 1:59.644 (lap 19)

=== Sprint race ===
Pos.	No.	Driver	Team	Laps	Time/Retired	Grid	Points
1	3	(United Kingdom) James Calado	ART Grand Prix	18	36:21.338	1	15
2	7	(Colombia) Julián Leal	Racing Engineering	18	+0.447	3	12
3	22	(United Kingdom) Adrian Quaife-Hobbs	Hilmer Motorsport	18	+1.532	10	10
4	2	(Monaco) Stephane Richelmi	DAMS	18	+17.905	2	8
5	8	(Switzerland) Fabio Leimer	Racing Engineering	18	+29.053	5	6
6	10	(United Kingdom) Jolyon Palmer	Carlin	18	+33.284	15	4
7	5	(Venezuela) Johnny Cecotto Jr.	Arden International	18	+37.321	14	2
8	9	(Brazil) Felipe Nasr	Carlin	18	+40.455	26	1
9	12	(France) Tom Dillmann	Russian Time	18	+41.052	4	
10	6	(New Zealand) Mitch Evans	Arden International	18	+43.421	11	
11	19	(Switzerland) Simon Trummer	Rapax	18	+44.373	12	
12	14	(Spain) Sergio Canamasas	Caterham Racing	18	+45.170	23	
13	20	(France) Nathanael Berthon	Trident Racing	18	+45.987	22	
14	11	(United Kingdom) Sam Bird	Russian Time	18	+47.459	8	
15	1	(Sweden) Marcus Ericsson	DAMS	18	+50.141	7	
16	4	(Germany) Daniel Abt	ART Grand Prix	18	+50.726	16	
17	27	(Netherlands) Daniel de Jong	MP Motorsport	18	+50.818	24	
18	25	(Italy) Vittorio Ghirelli	Venezuela GP Lazarus	18	+53.466	18	
19	26	(Spain) Dani Clos	MP Motorsport	18	+54.532	20	
20	24	(Austria) Rene Binder	Venezuela GP Lazarus	18	+59.796	25	
21	16	(United States) Jake Rosenzweig	Barwa Addax Team	18	+1:03.052	17	
22	15	(United States) Alexander Rossi	Caterham Racing	18	+1:18.035	6	
23	18	(Monaco) Stefano Coletti	Rapax	18	+1:21.639	13	
24	21	(Portugal) Ricardo Teixeira	Trident Racing	18	+1:27.956	21	
25	17	(Indonesia) Rio Haryanto	Barwa Addax Team	17	+1 lap	19	
Ret	23	(Netherlands) Robin Frijns	Hilmer Motorsport	1	Retired	9	
Fastest lap: James Calado (ART Grand Prix) 2:00.298 (lap 3)

== See also ==
- 2013 Belgian Grand Prix
- 2013 Spa-Francorchamps GP3 Series round

Previous round: 2013 Hungaroring GP2 Series round	GP2 Series; 2013 season	Next round: 2013 Monza GP2 Series round
Previous round: 2012 Spa-Francorchamps GP2 Series round	GP2 Spa-Francorchamps round	Next round: 2014 Spa-Francorchamps GP2 Series round
