= 2013 Hungaroring GP2 Series round =

Car race

(Hungary) 2013 Hungaroring GP2 round
Round details
- Round 7 of 11 rounds in the 2013 GP2 Series
- Layout of the Hungaroring circuit
- Location: Hungaroring, Mogyoród, Hungary
- Course: Permanent racing facility 4.381 km (2.722 mi)

GP2 Series

Feature race
- Date: 27 July 2013
- Laps: 36

Pole position
Driver	(France) Tom Dillmann	Russian Time
- Time: 1:28.219

Podium
First	(United Kingdom) Jolyon Palmer	Carlin
Second	(Sweden) Marcus Ericsson	DAMS
Third	(Brazil) Felipe Nasr	Carlin

Fastest lap
Driver	(Sweden) Marcus Ericsson	DAMS
- Time: 1:32.290 (on lap 9)

Sprint race
- Date: 28 July 2013
- Laps: 28

Podium
First	(France) Nathanaël Berthon	Trident Racing
Second	(New Zealand) Mitch Evans	Arden International
Third	(Switzerland) Fabio Leimer	Racing Engineering

Fastest lap
Driver	(France) Nathanaël Berthon	Trident Racing
- Time: 1:32.606 (on lap 4)

The 2013 Hungaroring GP2 Series round was a GP2 Series motor race held on July 27 and 28, 2013 at Hungaroring, Hungary. It was the seventh round of the 2013 GP2 season. The race supported the 2013 Hungarian Grand Prix.

== Classification ==
=== Qualifying ===
Pos.	No.	Driver	Team	Time	Grid
1	12	(France) Tom Dillmann	Russian Time	1:28.219	1
2	11	(United Kingdom) Sam Bird	Russian Time	1:28.296	5
3	8	(Switzerland) Fabio Leimer	Racing Engineering	1:28.507	2
4	9	(Brazil) Felipe Nasr	Carlin	1:28.679	3
5	1	(Sweden) Marcus Ericsson	DAMS	1:28.709	4
6	2	(Monaco) Stephane Richelmi	DAMS	1:28.753	6
7	10	(United Kingdom) Jolyon Palmer	Carlin	1:28.802	7
8	17	(Indonesia) Rio Haryanto	Barwa Addax Team	1:28.826	8
9	15	(United States) Alexander Rossi	Caterham Racing	1:28.851	9
10	27	(Netherlands) Daniel de Jong	MP Motorsport	1:28.855	PL
11	5	(Venezuela) Johnny Cecotto Jr.	Arden International	1:28.927	10
12	6	(New Zealand) Mitch Evans	Arden International	1:29.012	11
13	20	(France) Nathanael Berthon	Trident Racing	1:29.020	12
14	3	(United Kingdom) James Calado	ART Grand Prix	1:29.128	13
15	23	(United Kingdom) Jon Lancaster	Hilmer Motorsport	1:29.136	14
16	16	(United States) Jake Rosenzweig	Barwa Addax Team	1:29.206	15
17	19	(Switzerland) Simon Trummer	Rapax	1:29.403	16
18	18	(Monaco) Stefano Coletti	Rapax	1:29.519	17
19	7	(Colombia) Julián Leal	Racing Engineering	1:29.524	18
20	4	(Germany) Daniel Abt	ART Grand Prix	1:29.735	19
21	24	(Austria) Rene Binder	Venezuela GP Lazarus	1:29.742	20
22	26	(United Kingdom) Adrian Quaife-Hobbs	Hilmer Motorsport	1:29.793	21
23	26	(Spain) Dani Clos	MP Motorsport	1:29.877	PL
24	14	(Spain) Sergio Canamasas	Caterham Racing	1:30.078	22
25	25	(Italy) Vittorio Ghirelli	Venezuela GP Lazarus	1:30.251	24
26	21	(Portugal) Ricardo Teixeira	Trident Racing	1:31.254	23

=== Feature race ===
Pos.	No.	Driver	Team	Laps	Time/Retired	Grid	Points
1	10	(United Kingdom) Jolyon Palmer	Carlin	36	57:14.477	7	25
2	1	(Sweden) Marcus Ericsson	DAMS	36	+15.407	5	18+2
3	9	(Brazil) Felipe Nasr	Carlin	36	+15.794	3	15
4	8	(Switzerland) Fabio Leimer	Racing Engineering	36	+19.433	2	12
5	2	(Monaco) Stephane Richelmi	DAMS	36	+19.740	6	10
6	19	(Switzerland) Simon Trummer	Rapax	36	+21.499	16	8
7	6	(New Zealand) Mitch Evans	Arden International	36	+22.584	11	6
8	20	(France) Nathanael Berthon	Trident Racing	36	+36.439	12	4
9	3	(United Kingdom) James Calado	ART Grand Prix	36	+38.203	13	2
10	11	(United Kingdom) Sam Bird	Russian Time	36	+44.671	5	1
11	17	(Indonesia) Rio Haryanto	Barwa Addax Team	36	+51.951	8	
12	27	(Netherlands) Daniel de Jong	MP Motorsport	36	+52.520	PL	
13	15	(United States) Alexander Rossi	Caterham Racing	36	+54.815	9	
14	26	(Spain) Dani Clos	MP Motorsport	36	+55.990	PL	
15	7	(Colombia) Julián Leal	Racing Engineering	36	+56.302	18	
16	18	(Monaco) Stefano Coletti	Rapax	36	+57.202	17	
17	25	(Italy) Vittorio Ghirelli	Venezuela GP Lazarus	36	+58.624	24	
18	26	(United Kingdom) Adrian Quaife-Hobbs	Hilmer Motorsport	36	+1:05.995	21	
19	21	(Portugal) Ricardo Teixeira	Trident Racing	36	+1:16.133	23	
20	12	(France) Tom Dillmann	Russian Time	36	+1:33.788	1	4
21	5	(Venezuela) Johnny Cecotto Jr.	Arden International	35	+1 lap	10	
22	24	(Austria) Rene Binder	Venezuela GP Lazarus	35	+1 lap	20	
23	23	(United Kingdom) Jon Lancaster	Hilmer Motorsport	35	+1 lap	14	
24	4	(Germany) Daniel Abt	ART Grand Prix	34	Retired	19	
25	16	(United States) Jake Rosenzweig	Barwa Addax Team	32	Retired	15	
Ret	14	(Spain) Sergio Canamasas	Caterham Racing	17	Retired	22	
Fastest lap: Marcus Ericsson (DAMS) 1:32.290 (lap 9)

=== Sprint race ===
Pos.	No.	Driver	Team	Laps	Time/Retired	Grid	Points
1	20	(France) Nathanael Berthon	Trident Racing	28	45:06.319	1	15+2
2	6	(New Zealand) Mitch Evans	Arden International	28	+2.239	2	12
3	8	(Switzerland) Fabio Leimer	Racing Engineering	28	+13.441	5	10
4	1	(Sweden) Marcus Ericsson	DAMS	28	+15.983	7	8
5	9	(Brazil) Felipe Nasr	Carlin	28	+23.367	6	6
6	3	(United Kingdom) James Calado	ART Grand Prix	28	+27.216	9	4
7	19	(Switzerland) Simon Trummer	Rapax	28	+31.387	3	2
8	11	(United Kingdom) Sam Bird	Russian Time	28	+37.958	10	1
9	2	(Monaco) Stephane Richelmi	DAMS	28	+40.002	4	
10	17	(Indonesia) Rio Haryanto	Barwa Addax Team	28	+43.991	11	
11	12	(France) Tom Dillmann	Russian Time	28	+44.383	20	
12	10	(United Kingdom) Jolyon Palmer	Carlin	28	+51.408	8	
13	24	(Austria) Rene Binder	Venezuela GP Lazarus	28	+51.699	22	
14	4	(Germany) Daniel Abt	ART Grand Prix	28	+56.342	26	
15	16	(United States) Jake Rosenzweig	Barwa Addax Team	28	+1.01.084	24	
16	15	(United States) Alexander Rossi	Caterham Racing	28	+1.05.663	13	
17	25	(Italy) Vittorio Ghirelli	Venezuela GP Lazarus	28	+1:11.592	17	
18	23	(United Kingdom) Jon Lancaster	Hilmer Motorsport	28	+1:12.378	23	
19	21	(Portugal) Ricardo Teixeira	Trident Racing	28	+1:13.045	19	
20	18	(Monaco) Stefano Coletti	Rapax	27	+1 lap/DNF	16	
21	7	(Colombia) Julián Leal	Racing Engineering	27	+2 laps	15	
Ret	26	(Spain) Dani Clos	MP Motorsport	24	Retired	14	
Ret	5	(Venezuela) Johnny Cecotto Jr.	Arden International	19	Retired	21	
Ret	14	(Spain) Sergio Canamasas	Caterham Racing	1	Retired	25	
Ret	27	(Netherlands) Daniel de Jong	MP Motorsport	0	Retired	12	
Ret	26	(United Kingdom) Adrian Quaife-Hobbs	Hilmer Motorsport	0	Retired	18	
Fastest lap: Nathanaël Berthon (Trident Racing) 1:32.606 (lap 4)

== See also ==
- 2013 Hungarian Grand Prix
- 2013 Hungaroring GP3 Series round

Previous round: 2013 Nürburgring GP2 Series round	GP2 Series; 2013 season	Next round: 2013 Spa-Francorchamps GP2 Series round
Previous round: 2012 Hungaroring GP2 Series round	Hungaroring GP2 round	Next round: 2014 Hungaroring GP2 Series round
