= 2014 Sochi GP2 Series round =

(Russia) 2014 Sochi GP2 round
Round details
- Round 11 of 12 rounds in the 2014 GP2 Series
- Layout of the Sochi Autodrom
- Location: Sochi Autodrom; Sochi, Krasnodar Krai, Russia
- Course: Semi-permanent racing facility 5.853 km (3.637 mi)

GP2 Series

Feature race
- Date: 11 October 2014
- Laps: 30

Pole position
Driver	(Belgium) Stoffel Vandoorne	ART Grand Prix
- Time: 1:45.402

Podium
First	(United Kingdom) Jolyon Palmer	DAMS
Second	(New Zealand) Mitch Evans	RT Russian Time
Third	(Italy) Raffaele Marciello	Racing Engineering

Fastest lap
Driver	(Belgium) Stoffel Vandoorne	ART Grand Prix
- Time: 1:46.407 (on lap 28)

Sprint race
- Date: 12 October 2014
- Laps: 21

Podium
First	(Denmark) Marco Sørensen	MP Motorsport
Second	(Belgium) Stoffel Vandoorne	ART Grand Prix
Third	(Brazil) Felipe Nasr	Carlin

Fastest lap
Driver	(France) Arthur Pic	Campos Racing
- Time: 1:47.277 (on lap 21)

The 2014 Sochi GP2 Series round was a GP2 Series motor race held on October 11 and 12, 2014 at Sochi Autodrom in Sochi, Russia. It was the eleventh and penultimate round of the 2014 GP2 Series. and the race weekend was run in support of the Russian Grand Prix.

Jolyon Palmer won the GP2 Series' feature race, and in doing so, secured enough points to win the 2014 drivers' title.

== See also ==
- 2014 Russian Grand Prix
- 2014 Sochi GP3 Series round

Previous round: 2014 Monza GP2 round	GP2 Series; 2014 season	Next round: 2014 Yas Marina GP2 round
Previous round: none	Sochi GP2 round	Next round: 2015 Sochi GP2 round
