= 2013 Nürburgring GP2 Series round =

2013 German Grand Prix race

(Germany) 2013 German GP2 round
Round details
- Round 6 of 11 rounds in the 2013 GP2 Series
- Location: Nürburgring, Nürburg, Germany
- Course: Permanent racing facility 5.148 km (3.199 mi)

GP2 Series

Feature race
- Date: 6 July 2013
- Laps: 32

Pole position
Driver	(Monaco) Stephane Richelmi	DAMS
- Time: 1:38.487

Podium
First	(Sweden) Marcus Ericsson	DAMS
Second	(United Kingdom) James Calado	ART Grand Prix
Third	(Monaco) Stefano Coletti	Rapax

Fastest lap
Driver	(Sweden) Marcus Ericsson	DAMS
- Time: 1:43.050 (on lap 11)

Sprint race
- Date: 7 July 2013
- Laps: 24

Podium
First	(United Kingdom) Jon Lancaster	Hilmer Motorsport
Second	(United Kingdom) James Calado	ART Grand Prix
Third	(Switzerland) Fabio Leimer	Racing Engineering

Fastest lap
Driver	(United Kingdom) James Calado	ART Grand Prix
- Time: 1:42.303 (on lap 7)

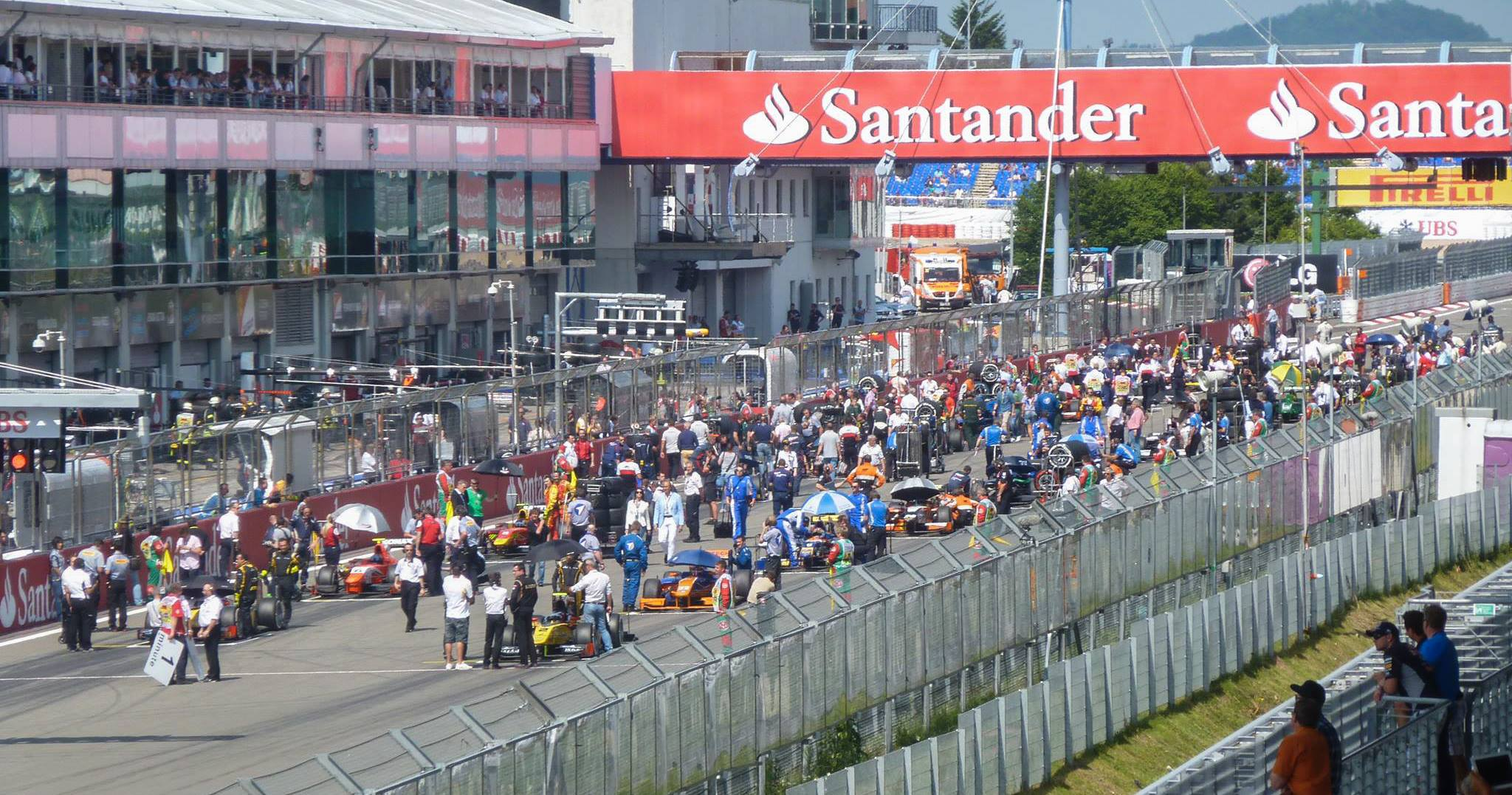
Feature Race starting grid

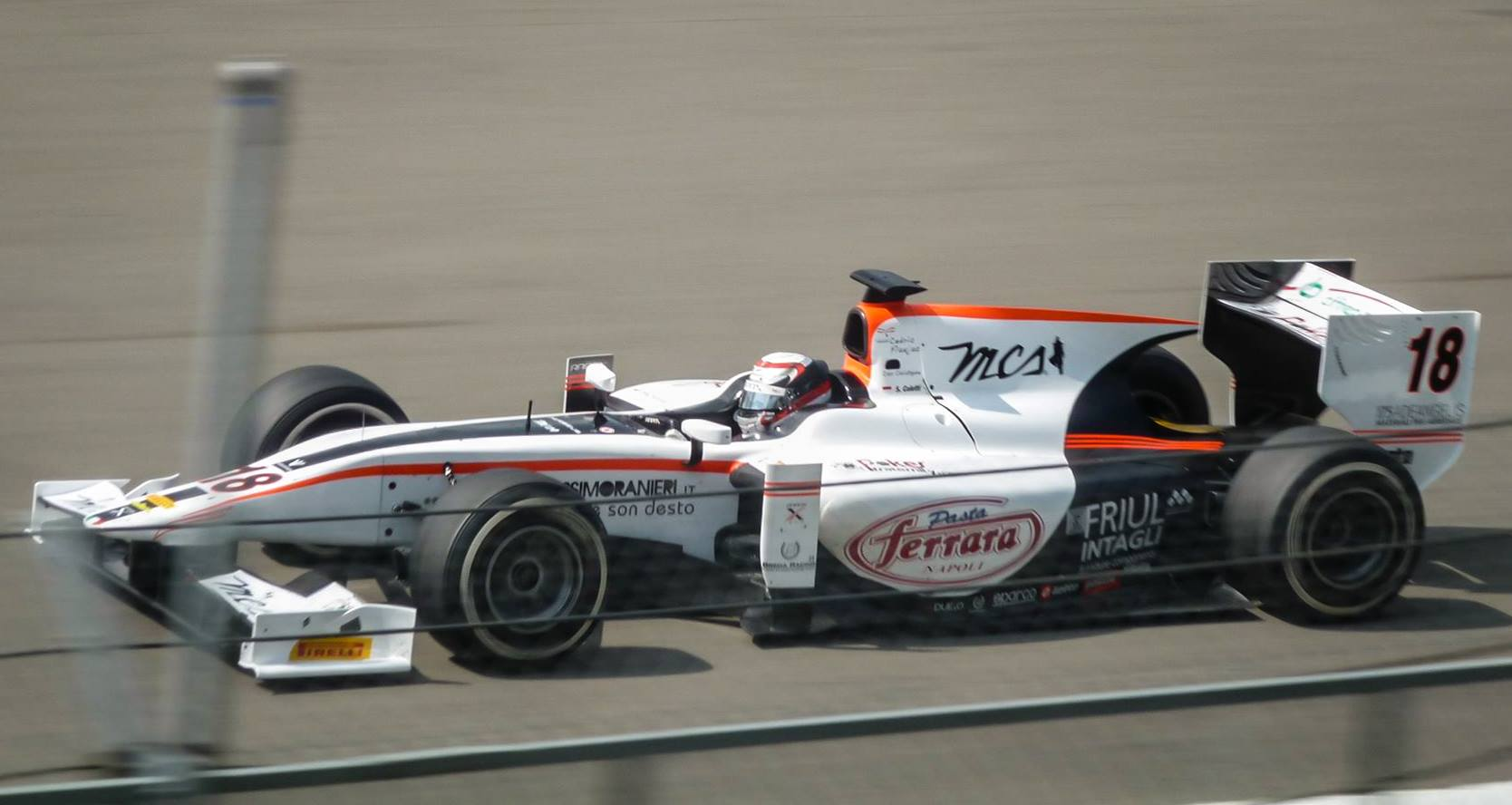
Stefano Coletti

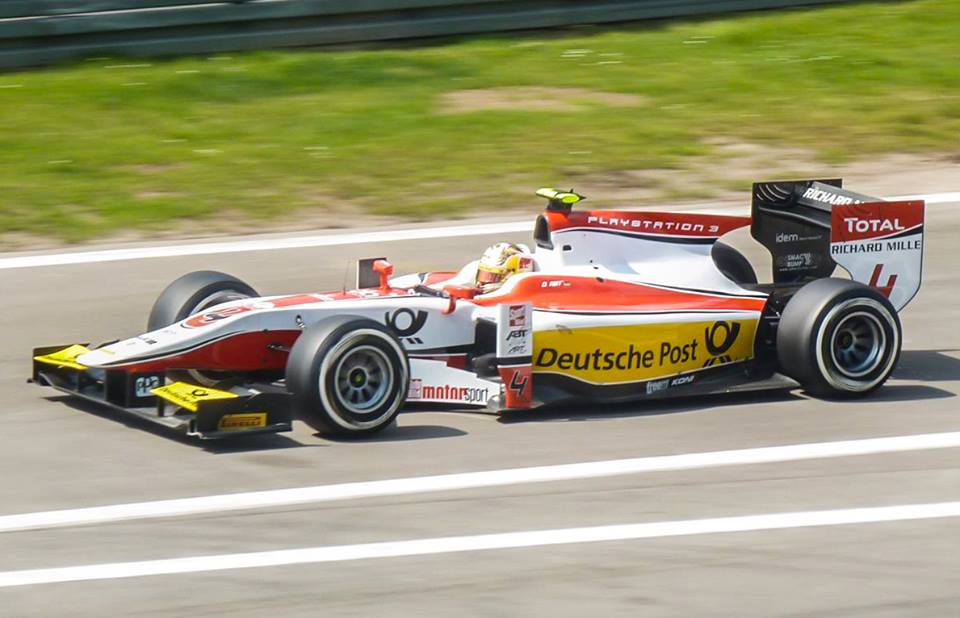
Daniel Abt

The 2013 Nürburgring GP2 Series round was a GP2 Series motor race held on July 6 and 7, 2013 at Nürburgring, Germany. It was the sixth round of the 2013 GP2 season. The race supported the 2013 German Grand Prix.

== Classification ==
=== Qualifying ===
Pos	No.	Driver	Team	Time	Grid
1	2	(Monaco) Stephane Richelmi	DAMS	1:38.487	1
2	1	(Sweden) Marcus Ericsson	DAMS	1:38.763	2
3	22	(Netherlands) Robin Frijns	Hilmer Motorsport	1:38.804	3
4	6	(New Zealand) Mitch Evans	Arden International	1:38.848	4
5	9	(Brazil) Felipe Nasr	Carlin	1:38.897	5
6	8	(Switzerland) Fabio Leimer	Racing Engineering	1:38.997	6
7	26	(United Kingdom) Adrian Quaife-Hobbs	MP Motorsport	1:39.006	7
8	3	(United Kingdom) James Calado	ART Grand Prix	1:39.018	8
9	11	(United Kingdom) Sam Bird	Russian Time	1:39.089	9
10	12	(France) Tom Dillmann	Russian Time	1:39.186	10
11	10	(United Kingdom) Jolyon Palmer	Carlin	1:39.193	11
12	24	(Austria) Rene Binder	Venezuela GP Lazarus	1:39.243	12
13	18	(Monaco) Stefano Coletti	Rapax	1:39.274	13
14	15	(United States) Alexander Rossi	Caterham Racing	1:39.320	14
15	25	(Italy) Fabrizio Crestani	Venezuela GP Lazarus	1:39.374	15
16	23	(United Kingdom) Jon Lancaster	Hilmer Motorsport	1:39.379	16
17	14	(Spain) Sergio Canamasas	Caterham Racing	1:39.465	17
18	27	(Netherlands) Daniel de Jong	MP Motorsport	1:39.503	18
19	5	(Venezuela) Johnny Cecotto Jr.	Arden International	1:39.723	19
20	17	(Indonesia) Rio Haryanto	Barwa Addax Team	1:39.780	20
21	20	(France) Nathanael Berthon	Trident Racing	1:39.792	21
22	4	(Germany) Daniel Abt	ART Grand Prix	1:39.813	22
23	21	(Italy) Kevin Ceccon	Trident Racing	1:39.786	23
24	7	(Colombia) Julián Leal	Racing Engineering	1:39.986	24
25	16	(United States) Jake Rosenzweig	Barwa Addax Team	1:39.064	25
26	19	(Switzerland) Simon Trummer	Rapax	1:39.311	26

=== Feature Race ===
Pos	No.	Driver	Team	Laps	Time/Retired	Grid	Points
1	1	(Sweden) Marcus Ericsson	DAMS	32	1:00:16.988	2	25+2
2	3	(United Kingdom) James Calado	ART Grand Prix	32	+7.860	8	18
3	18	(Monaco) Stefano Coletti	Rapax	32	+14.915	13	15
4	8	(Switzerland) Fabio Leimer	Racing Engineering	32	+15.061	6	12
5	2	(Monaco) Stephane Richelmi	DAMS	32	+15.119	1	10+4
6	22	(Netherlands) Robin Frijns	Hilmer Motorsport	32	+15.272	3	8
7	23	(United Kingdom) Jon Lancaster	Hilmer Motorsport	32	+17.156	16	6
8	12	(France) Tom Dillmann	Russian Time	32	+17.823	10	4
9	9	(Brazil) Felipe Nasr	Carlin	32	+24.265	5	2
10	5	(Venezuela) Johnny Cecotto Jr.	Arden International	32	+24.333	19	1
11	15	(United States) Alexander Rossi	Caterham Racing	32	+26.797	14	
12	14	(Spain) Sergio Canamasas	Caterham Racing	32	+27.221	17	
13	11	(United Kingdom) Sam Bird	Russian Time	32	+31.518	9	
14	19	(Switzerland) Simon Trummer	Rapax	32	+31.592	26	
15	27	(Netherlands) Daniel de Jong	MP Motorsport	32	+33.904	18	
16	6	(New Zealand) Mitch Evans	Arden International	32	+34.142	4	
17	20	(France) Nathanael Berthon	Trident Racing	32	+36.142	21	
18	17	(Indonesia) Rio Haryanto	Barwa Addax Team	32	+43.318	20	
19	25	(Italy) Fabrizio Crestani	Venezuela GP Lazarus	32	+45.117	15	
20	24	(Austria) Rene Binder	Venezuela GP Lazarus	32	+45.498	12	
21	4	(Germany) Daniel Abt	ART Grand Prix	32	+58.723	22	
22	7	(Colombia) Julián Leal	Racing Engineering	32	+59.186	24	
23	16	(United States) Jake Rosenzweig	Barwa Addax Team	32	+1:08.725	25	
24	10	(United Kingdom) Jolyon Palmer	Carlin	32	+1:42.868	11	
Ret	26	(United Kingdom) Adrian Quaife-Hobbs	MP Motorsport	0	Retired	7	
Ret	21	(Italy) Kevin Ceccon	Trident Racing	0	Retired	23	
Fastest lap: Marcus Ericsson (DAMS) 1:43.050 (lap 11)

=== Sprint Race ===
Pos	No.	Driver	Team	Laps	Time/Retired	Grid	Points
1	23	(United Kingdom) Jon Lancaster	Hilmer Motorsport	24	42:37.655	2	15
2	3	(United Kingdom) James Calado	ART Grand Prix	24	+1.528	7	12+2
3	8	(Switzerland) Fabio Leimer	Racing Engineering	24	+25.797	5	10
4	9	(Brazil) Felipe Nasr	Carlin	24	+25.797	9	8
5	5	(Venezuela) Johnny Cecotto Jr.	Arden International	24	+32.336	10	6
6	15	(United States) Alexander Rossi	Caterham Racing	24	+34.479	11	4
7	6	(New Zealand) Mitch Evans	Arden International	24	+34.751	16	2
8	11	(United Kingdom) Sam Bird	Russian Time	24	+36.635	13	1
9	19	(Switzerland) Simon Trummer	Rapax	24	+40.088	14	
10	24	(Austria) Rene Binder	Venezuela GP Lazarus	24	+40.237	20	
11	10	(United Kingdom) Jolyon Palmer	Carlin	24	+41.402	24	
12	7	(Colombia) Julián Leal	Racing Engineering	24	+42.434	22	
13	1	(Sweden) Marcus Ericsson	DAMS	24	+43.482	8	
14	17	(Indonesia) Rio Haryanto	Barwa Addax Team	24	+43.806	18	
15	20	(France) Nathanael Berthon	Trident Racing	24	+43.979	17	
16	26	(United Kingdom) Adrian Quaife-Hobbs	MP Motorsport	24	+53.763	25	
17	14	(Spain) Sergio Canamasas	Caterham Racing	24	+54.039	12	
18	4	(Germany) Daniel Abt	ART Grand Prix	24	+1:01.093	21	
19	18	(Monaco) Stefano Coletti	Rapax	24	+1:09.152	6	
20	16	(United States) Jake Rosenzweig	Barwa Addax Team	24	+1:19.684	23	
21	25	(Italy) Fabrizio Crestani	Venezuela GP Lazarus	23	+1 lap	19	
Ret	12	(France) Tom Dillmann	Russian Time	14	Retired	1	
Ret	22	(Netherlands) Robin Frijns	Hilmer Motorsport	10	Retired	3	
Ret	27	(Netherlands) Daniel de Jong	MP Motorsport	2	Retired	15	
Ret	2	(Monaco) Stephane Richelmi	DAMS	1	Retired	4	
Fastest lap: James Calado (ART Grand Prix) 1:42.303 (lap 7)

== See also ==
- 2013 German Grand Prix
- 2013 Nürburgring GP3 Series round

Previous round: 2013 Silverstone GP2 Series round	GP2 Series; 2013 season	Next round: 2013 Hungaroring GP2 Series round
Previous round: 2011 Nürburgring GP2 Series round	Nürburgring GP2 round	Next round: none
