= 2013 Yas Marina GP2 Series round =

Car racing competition

(United Arab Emirates) 2013 Yas Marina GP2 round
Round details
- Round 11 of 11 rounds in the 2013 GP2 Series
- Layout of the Yas Marina Circuit
- Location: Yas Marina Circuit, Abu Dhabi, United Arab Emirates
- Course: Permanent racing facility 5.554 km (3.451 mi)

GP2 Series

Feature race
- Date: 2 November 2013
- Laps: 29

Pole position
Driver	(United States) Alexander Rossi	Caterham Racing
- Time: 1:48.931

Podium
First	(United States) Alexander Rossi	Caterham Racing
Second	(United Kingdom) Jolyon Palmer	Carlin
Third	(Sweden) Marcus Ericsson	DAMS

Fastest lap
Driver	(United Kingdom) Jolyon Palmer	Carlin
- Time: 1:52.873 (on lap 22)

Sprint race
- Date: 3 November 2013
- Laps: 22

Podium
First	(United Kingdom) James Calado	ART Grand Prix
Second	(Spain) Dani Clos	MP Motorsport
Third	(Switzerland) Fabio Leimer	Racing Engineering

Fastest lap
Driver	(Spain) Dani Clos	MP Motorsport
- Time: 1:53.360 (on lap 22)

The 2013 Yas Marina GP2 Series round was a GP2 Series motor race held on November 2 and 3, 2013 at Yas Marina Circuit, Abu Dhabi. It was the final round of the 2013 GP2 Series. The race supported the 2013 Abu Dhabi Grand Prix.

== Classification ==
=== Qualifying ===
Pos.	No.	Driver	Team	Time	Grid
1	15	(United States) Alexander Rossi	Caterham Racing	1:48.931	1
2	11	(United Kingdom) Sam Bird	Russian Time	1:49.241	2
3	10	(United Kingdom) Jolyon Palmer	Carlin	1:49.376	3
4	8	(Switzerland) Fabio Leimer	Racing Engineering	1:49.485	4
5	12	(France) Tom Dillmann	Russian Time	1:49.672	5
6	5	(Venezuela) Johnny Cecotto Jr.	Arden International	1:49.680	6
7	23	(United Kingdom) Jon Lancaster	Hilmer Motorsport	1:49.827	7
8	9	(Brazil) Felipe Nasr	Carlin	1:49.829	8
9	2	(Monaco) Stephane Richelmi	DAMS	1:49.835	9
10	26	(Spain) Dani Clos	MP Motorsport	1:49.846	10
11	6	(New Zealand) Mitch Evans	Arden International	1:49.864	11
12	1	(Sweden) Marcus Ericsson	DAMS	1:49.910	12
13	14	(Spain) Sergio Canamasas	Caterham Racing	1:49.951	13
14	3	(United Kingdom) James Calado	ART Grand Prix	1:50.002	19
15	17	(Indonesia) Rio Haryanto	Barwa Addax Team	1:50.334	14
16	20	(France) Nathanaël Berthon	Trident Racing	1:50.446	15
17	22	(United Kingdom) Adrian Quaife-Hobbs	Hilmer Motorsport	1:50.510	16
18	18	(Monaco) Stefano Coletti	Rapax	1:50.534	17
19	7	(Colombia) Julián Leal	Racing Engineering	1:50.553	19
20	19	(Switzerland) Simon Trummer	Rapax	1:50.634	20
21	16	(United States) Jake Rosenzweig	Barwa Addax Team	1:50.809	21
22	24	(Austria) Rene Binder	Venezuela GP Lazarus	1:50.884	22
23	27	(Netherlands) Daniel de Jong	MP Motorsport	1:50.906	23
24	4	(Germany) Daniel Abt	ART Grand Prix	1:50.907	25
25	25	(Italy) Vittorio Ghirelli	Venezuela GP Lazarus	1:51.493	24
26	21	(Canada) Gianmarco Raimondo	Trident Racing	1:52.311	26

=== Feature race ===
Pos.	No.	Driver	Team	Laps	Time/Retired	Grid	Points
1	15	(United States) Alexander Rossi	Caterham Racing	29	1:00:16.414	1	25
2	10	(United Kingdom) Jolyon Palmer	Carlin	29	+2.130	3	18
3	1	(Sweden) Marcus Ericsson	DAMS	29	+3.075	12	15
4	8	(Switzerland) Fabio Leimer	Racing Engineering	29	+4.687	4	12
5	26	(Spain) Dani Clos	MP Motorsport	29	+5.218	10	10
6	3	(United Kingdom) James Calado	ART Grand Prix	29	+6.370	19	8
7	9	(Brazil) Felipe Nasr	Carlin	29	+8.873	8	6
8	5	(Venezuela) Johnny Cecotto Jr.	Arden International	29	+12.142	6	4
9	4	(Germany) Daniel Abt	ART Grand Prix	29	+13.102	25	2
10	11	(United Kingdom) Sam Bird	Russian Time	29	+13.568	2	1
11	22	(United Kingdom) Adrian Quaife-Hobbs	Hilmer Motorsport	29	+14.852	16	
12	14	(Spain) Sergio Canamasas	Caterham Racing	29	+15.896	13	
13	19	(Switzerland) Simon Trummer	Rapax	29	+15.919	20	
14	17	(Indonesia) Rio Haryanto	Barwa Addax Team	29	+19.021	14	
15	24	(Austria) Rene Binder	Venezuela GP Lazarus	29	+19.229	22	
16	7	(Colombia) Julián Leal	Racing Engineering	29	+21.039	18	
17	21	(Canada) Gianmarco Raimondo	Trident Racing	29	+23.308	16	
18	20	(France) Nathanael Berthon	Trident Racing	28	+1 lap	15	
19	27	(Netherlands) Daniel de Jong	MP Motorsport	28	+1 lap	23	
20	18	(Monaco) Stefano Coletti	Rapax	28	+1 lap	17	
21	16	(United States) Jake Rosenzweig	Barwa Addax Team	26	+3 laps	21	
Ret	6	(New Zealand) Mitch Evans	Arden International	22	Retired	11	
Ret	25	(Italy) Vittorio Ghirelli	Venezuela GP Lazarus	9	Retired	24	
Ret	2	(Monaco) Stephane Richelmi	DAMS	1	Retired	9	
Ret	12	(France) Tom Dillmann	Russian Time	0	Retired	5	
Ret	23	(United Kingdom) Jon Lancaster	Hilmer Motorsport	0	Retired	7	
Fastest lap: Jolyon Palmer (Carlin) 1:52.873 (lap 22)

=== Sprint race ===
Pos.	No.	Driver	Team	Laps	Time/Retired	Grid	Points
1	3	(United Kingdom) James Calado	ART Grand Prix	22	44:04.124	3	15
2	26	(Spain) Dani Clos	MP Motorsport	22	+0.787	4	12
3	8	(Switzerland) Fabio Leimer	Racing Engineering	22	+4.965	5	10
4	11	(United Kingdom) Sam Bird	Russian Time	22	+9.440	10	8
5	4	(Germany) Daniel Abt	ART Grand Prix	22	+9.957	9	6
6	1	(Sweden) Marcus Ericsson	DAMS	22	+11.981	6	4
7	19	(Switzerland) Simon Trummer	Rapax	22	+13.188	13	2
8	14	(Spain) Sergio Canamasas	Caterham Racing	22	+16.432	12	1
9	18	(Monaco) Stefano Coletti	Rapax	22	+18.117	20	
10	7	(Colombia) Julián Leal	Racing Engineering	22	+18.487	16	
11	16	(United States) Jake Rosenzweig	Barwa Addax Team	22	+24.753	21	
12	17	(Indonesia) Rio Haryanto	Barwa Addax Team	22	+33.689	14	
13	20	(France) Nathanael Berthon	Trident Racing	22	+34.153	18	
14	6	(New Zealand) Mitch Evans	Arden International	22	+34.485	24	
15	21	(Canada) Gianmarco Raimondo	Trident Racing	22	+36.123	17	
16	24	(Austria) Rene Binder	Venezuela GP Lazarus	22	+36.884	15	
17	27	(Netherlands) Daniel de Jong	MP Motorsport	22	+37.471	19	
18	9	(Brazil) Felipe Nasr	Carlin	22	+40.271	2	
19	25	(Italy) Vittorio Ghirelli	Venezuela GP Lazarus	22	+41.869	22	
20	2	(Monaco) Stephane Richelmi	DAMS	22	+1:19.122	23	
Ret	22	(United Kingdom) Adrian Quaife-Hobbs	Hilmer Motorsport	19	Retired	11	
Ret	10	(United Kingdom) Jolyon Palmer	Carlin	17	Retired	7	
Ret	23	(United Kingdom) Jon Lancaster	Hilmer Motorsport	9	Retired	25	
Ret	5	(Venezuela) Johnny Cecotto Jr.	Arden International	0	Retired	1	
Ret	15	(United States) Alexander Rossi	Caterham Racing	0	Retired	8	
DNS	12	(France) Tom Dillmann	Russian Time	0	Did not start		
Fastest lap: Dani Clos (MP Motorsport) 1:53.360 (lap 22)

== See also ==
- 2013 Abu Dhabi Grand Prix
- 2013 Yas Marina GP3 Series round

Previous round: 2013 Marina Bay GP2 Series round	GP2 Series; 2013 season	Next round: 2014 Bahrain GP2 Series round
Previous round: 2011 GP2 Final (NC)	Yas Marina GP2 round	Next round: 2014 Yas Marina GP2 Series round
