= 2013 Monza GP2 Series round =

Motor race in Italy

(Italy) 2013 Monza GP2 round
Round details
- Round 9 of 11 rounds in the 2013 GP2 Series
- Layout of the Autodromo Nazionale Monza
- Location: Autodromo Nazionale Monza, Monza, Italy
- Course: Permanent racing facility 5.793 km (3.600 mi)

GP2 Series

Feature race
- Date: 7 September 2013
- Laps: 30

Pole position
Driver	(United Kingdom) Sam Bird	Russian Time
- Time: 1:31.788

Podium
First	(Switzerland) Fabio Leimer	Racing Engineering
Second	(United Kingdom) Sam Bird	Russian Time
Third	(France) Tom Dillmann	Russian Time

Fastest lap
Driver	(United Kingdom) Sam Bird	Russian Time
- Time: 1:32.749 (on lap 25)

Sprint race
- Date: 8 September 2013
- Laps: 21

Podium
First	(United Kingdom) Adrian Quaife-Hobbs	Hilmer Motorsport
Second	(United States) Alexander Rossi	Caterham Racing
Third	(Colombia) Julián Leal	Racing Engineering

Fastest lap
Driver	(Switzerland) Fabio Leimer	Racing Engineering
- Time: 1:32.749 (on lap 21)

The 2013 Monza GP2 Series round was a GP2 Series motor race held on September 7 and 8, 2013 at Autodromo Nazionale Monza, Italy. It was the ninth round of the 2013 GP2 Series. The race supported the 2013 Italian Grand Prix.

== Classification ==
=== Qualifying ===
Pos.	No.	Driver	Team	Time	Grid
1	11	(United Kingdom) Sam Bird	Russian Time	1:31.788	1
2	8	(Switzerland) Fabio Leimer	Racing Engineering	1:31.822	2
3	10	(United Kingdom) Jolyon Palmer	Carlin	1:31.843	3
4	1	(Sweden) Marcus Ericsson	DAMS	1:31.915	4
5	12	(France) Tom Dillmann	Russian Time	1:31.949	5
6	18	(Monaco) Stefano Coletti	Rapax	1:31.993	6
7	26	(Spain) Dani Clos	MP Motorsport	1:32.024	26
8	3	(United Kingdom) James Calado	ART Grand Prix	1:32.033	7
9	16	(United States) Jake Rosenzweig	Barwa Addax Team	1:32.100	8
10	19	(Switzerland) Simon Trummer	Rapax	1:32.164	9
11	2	(Monaco) Stephane Richelmi	DAMS	1:32.168	10
12	9	(Brazil) Felipe Nasr	Carlin	1:32.381	11
13	17	(Indonesia) Rio Haryanto	Barwa Addax Team	1:32.384	12
14	7	(Colombia) Julián Leal	Racing Engineering	1:32.398	13
15	15	(United States) Alexander Rossi	Caterham Racing	1:32.447	14
16	22	(United Kingdom) Adrian Quaife-Hobbs	Hilmer Motorsport	1:32.462	15
17	6	(New Zealand) Mitch Evans	Arden International	1:32.481	16
18	23	(United Kingdom) Jon Lancaster	Hilmer Motorsport	1:32.482	25
19	20	(France) Nathanael Berthon	Trident Racing	1:32.554	17
20	4	(Germany) Daniel Abt	ART Grand Prix	1:32.627	18
21	5	(Venezuela) Johnny Cecotto Jr.	Arden International	1:32.650	19
22	27	(Netherlands) Daniel de Jong	MP Motorsport	1:32.751	20
23	21	(Italy) Sergio Campana	Trident Racing	1:33.195	21
24	24	(Austria) Rene Binder	Venezuela GP Lazarus	1:33.292	22
25	25	(Italy) Vittorio Ghirelli	Venezuela GP Lazarus	1:33.405	23
26	14	(Spain) Sergio Canamasas	Caterham Racing	1:34.963	24

=== Feature race ===
Pos.	No.	Driver	Team	Laps	Time/Retired	Grid	Points
1	8	(Switzerland) Fabio Leimer	Racing Engineering	30	47:48.311	2	25
2	11	(United Kingdom) Sam Bird	Russian Time	30	+0.806	1	18
3	12	(France) Tom Dillmann	Russian Time	30	+6.137	5	15
4	2	(Monaco) Stephane Richelmi	DAMS	30	+9.902	10	12
5	7	(Colombia) Julián Leal	Racing Engineering	30	+15.400	13	10
6	3	(United Kingdom) James Calado	ART Grand Prix	30	+18.748	7	8
7	22	(United Kingdom) Adrian Quaife-Hobbs	Hilmer Motorsport	30	+24.007	15	6
8	15	(United States) Alexander Rossi	Caterham Racing	30	+30.276	14	4
9	14	(Spain) Sergio Canamasas	Caterham Racing	30	+40.272	24	2
10	25	(Italy) Vittorio Ghirelli	Venezuela GP Lazarus	30	+44.906	23	1
11	27	(Netherlands) Daniel de Jong	MP Motorsport	30	+46.540	20	
12	5	(Venezuela) Johnny Cecotto Jr.	Arden International	30	+47.382	19	
13	23	(United Kingdom) Jon Lancaster	Hilmer Motorsport	30	+47.635	25	
14	17	(Indonesia) Rio Haryanto	Barwa Addax Team	30	+48.003	12	
15	21	(Italy) Sergio Campana	Trident Racing	30	+50.194	21	
16	24	(Austria) Rene Binder	Venezuela GP Lazarus	30	+1:02.186	22	
17	4	(Germany) Daniel Abt	ART Grand Prix	29	+1 lap	18	
18	26	(Spain) Dani Clos	MP Motorsport	29	+1 lap	26	
Ret	18	(Monaco) Stefano Coletti	Rapax	24	Retired	6	
Ret	9	(Brazil) Felipe Nasr	Carlin	18	Retired	11	
Ret	1	(Sweden) Marcus Ericsson	DAMS	16	Retired	4	
Ret	10	(United Kingdom) Jolyon Palmer	Carlin	11	Retired	3	
Ret	16	(United States) Jake Rosenzweig	Barwa Addax Team	4	Retired	8	
Ret	19	(Switzerland) Simon Trummer	Rapax	1	Retired	9	
Ret	6	(New Zealand) Mitch Evans	Arden International	1	Retired	16	
Ret	20	(France) Nathanael Berthon	Trident Racing	0	Retired	17	
Fastest lap: Sam Bird (Russian Time) 1:32.749 (lap 25)

=== Sprint race ===
Pos.	No.	Driver	Team	Laps	Time/Retired	Grid	Points
1	22	(United Kingdom) Adrian Quaife-Hobbs	Hilmer Motorsport	21	32:51.149	2	15
2	15	(United States) Alexander Rossi	Caterham Racing	21	+1.849	1	12
3	7	(Colombia) Julián Leal	Racing Engineering	21	+4.335	4	10
4	11	(United Kingdom) Sam Bird	Russian Time	21	+5.468	7	8
5	12	(France) Tom Dillmann	Russian Time	21	+8.636	6	6
6	8	(Switzerland) Fabio Leimer	Racing Engineering	21	+12.037	8	4
7	17	(Indonesia) Rio Haryanto	Barwa Addax Team	21	+14.899	14	2
8	5	(Venezuela) Johnny Cecotto Jr.	Arden International	21	+17.338	12	1
9	26	(Spain) Dani Clos	MP Motorsport	21	+17.842	18	
10	10	(United Kingdom) Jolyon Palmer	Carlin	21	+23.973	22	
11	14	(Spain) Sergio Canamasas	Caterham Racing	21	+25.646	9	
12	9	(Brazil) Felipe Nasr	Carlin	21	+26.088	20	
13	18	(Monaco) Stefano Coletti	Rapax	21	+26.553	19	
14	24	(Austria) Rene Binder	Venezuela GP Lazarus	21	+28.119	16	
15	6	(New Zealand) Mitch Evans	Arden International	21	+28.504	25	
16	19	(Switzerland) Simon Trummer	Rapax	21	+29.004	24	
17	23	(United Kingdom) Jon Lancaster	Hilmer Motorsport	21	+29.588	13	
18	16	(United States) Jake Rosenzweig	Barwa Addax Team	21	+36.746	23	
19	27	(Netherlands) Daniel de Jong	MP Motorsport	21	+43.458	11	
20	25	(Italy) Vittorio Ghirelli	Venezuela GP Lazarus	21	+47.238	10	
21	20	(France) Nathanael Berthon	Trident Racing	21	+50.257	26	
22	4	(Germany) Daniel Abt	ART Grand Prix	21	+1:12.318	17	
23	1	(Sweden) Marcus Ericsson	DAMS	20	+1 lap	21	
24	21	(Italy) Sergio Campana	Trident Racing	20	+1 lap	15	
25	2	(Monaco) Stephane Richelmi	DAMS	20	+1 lap	5	
26	3	(United Kingdom) James Calado	ART Grand Prix	19	+2 laps	3	
Fastest lap: Fabio Leimer (Racing Engineering) 1:32.749 (lap 21)

== See also ==
- 2013 Italian Grand Prix
- 2013 Monza GP3 Series round

Previous round: 2013 Spa-Francorchamps GP2 Series round	GP2 Series; 2013 season	Next round: 2013 Marina Bay GP2 Series round
Previous round: 2012 Monza GP2 Series round	Monza GP2 round	Next round: 2014 Monza GP2 Series round
