= Caterham Academy =

Caterham Seven Academy Car
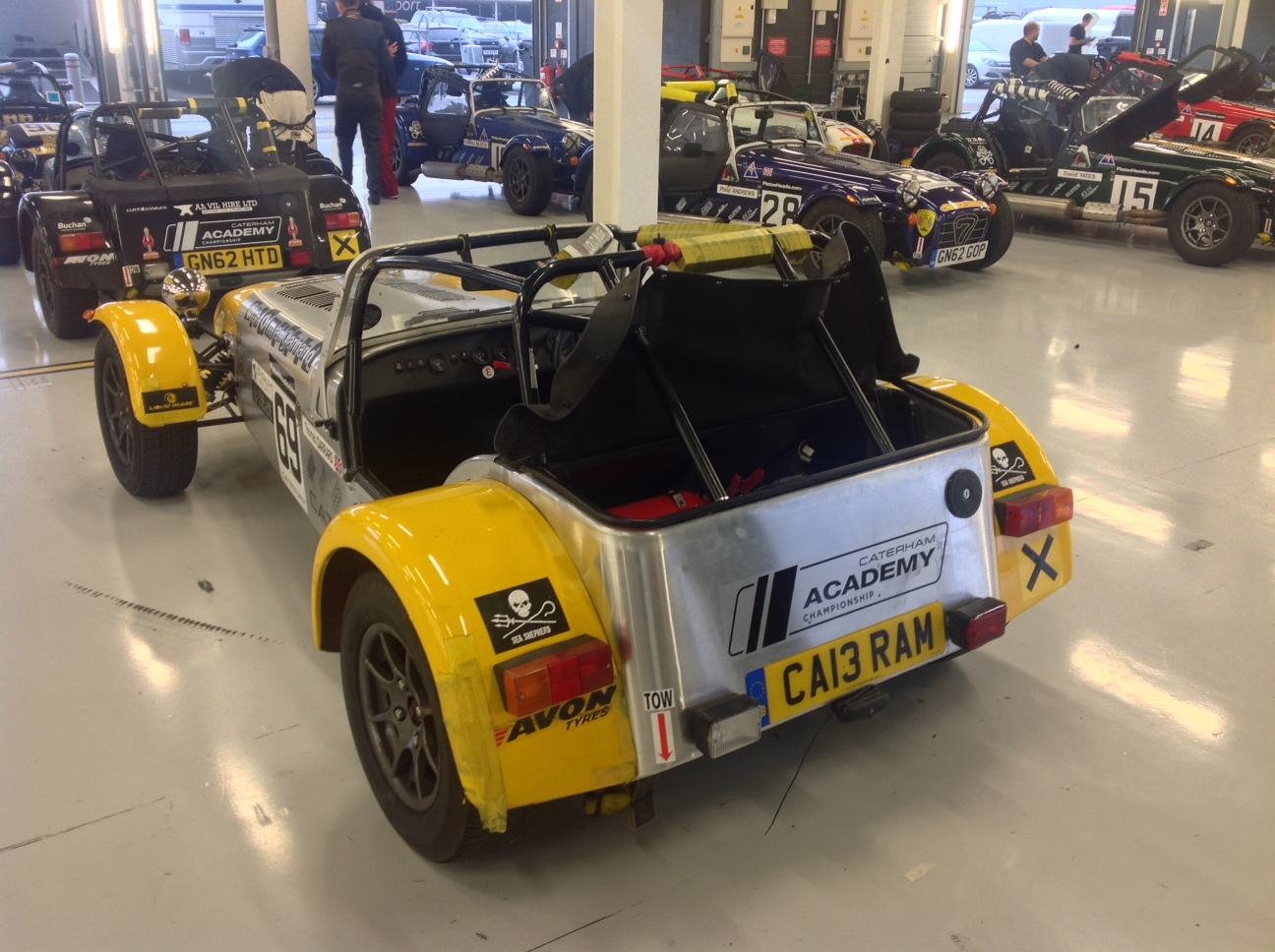

Overview
- Manufacturer: Caterham

The Caterham Academy is a motor-racing championship exclusively open to novices, as their first foray into motorsport.

== Scholarship years - 1995-1999 ==
In 1995 the Caterham Scholarship, a novices-only speed events and racing series, was established in the UK, to introduce new drivers to motorsport. The series format was a mix of sprints, hillclimbs and circuit races.

=== Ford Crossflow Cars 1995-97 ===
The initial cars were live axle 1600cc Ford 'Kent' Crossflows with rear-exit exhausts. The spec included a Caterham lightened & balanced flywheel, uprated competition clutch cover and drive plate, Caterham distributor with Ignitor electronic ignition, two Weber twin choke 40 DCOE 151 (sidedraft) carburettors, main jets size 120, 30mm venturi, with K&N performance filters. The maximum power was 100 bhp at 6000 rpm. They ran on list 1A Michelin MXT tyres.

=== Early Vauxhall Cars - 1998 ===
In 1998, the engine supplier changed to Vauxhall, with 1600 single overhead cam engines being used. They featured a ported & skimmed cylinder head, standard Vauxhall camshaft, flywheel and clutch cover plate, two Weber twin choke 40 DCOE 151 (sidedraft) carburettors, main jets size 115, with K&N performance filters. The maximum power was 101 ps at 5,500 rpm and a max torque of 107 lb ft at 3,600 rpm. The main visual difference between the Fords and the Vauxhalls was that the Vauxhalls had a side-exit exhaust, as opposed to the rear exit of the Fords.

The early Vauxhall cars used the same Spax dampers with manual adjusters as the Fords, with an option to adjustable spring platforms.

=== Later Vauxhall Cars ===
The 1999 and 2000 Vauxhall cars had linear coil springs over Bilstein (rather than Spax) dampers, again with the option of adjustable spring platforms, to optimise corner-weighting.

=== Rebranding to 'Academy' ===
For the 2000 season, the Scholarship was rebranded the "Caterham Academy"

== Academy Years - 2001-2006 ==
For the 2001 Academy, cars were supplied with the more modern Dedion chassis, and a Rover K series engine. An increasing number of cars were supplied with full rollover cages by this point, although it was not until 2003 that all Academy cars came with a full cage rather than a FIA-spec rollover bar and supporting strut in the passenger footwell.

Cars were supplied with the Caterham (Arch Motors) race chassis in 2001 and 2002. This is recognisable by a shorter passenger footwell (to accommodate the battery in the engine bay) and the handbrake under the dash on the passenger side. Cars from 2003 to 2006 were supplied with a centre (tunnel) handbrake.

From 2004, the Academy chassis was modified slightly and made more rigid. The transmission tunnel was raised slightly, and all cars were supplied with a lowered floorpan, giving the driver a couple of inches more headroom under the rollcage. The rollcage supplier changed at this point, as cars were supplied with 'Caged' rollover cages with slightly curved bars and different frontal load protection, rather than the 'Safety Devices' cages with straight diagonal bars of 2001 to 2003.

2005 cars were supplied with the new style combined side-impact and wheel intrusion bar, which allows the doors to open (the older style bar does not).

2006 cars were supplied with a new D-style 'Caged' rollcage. 2006 was the last year of the Arch Motors Academy chassis.

== Move to Metric Chassis - 2007 ==
In 2007, manufacture of the Academy chassis was moved to 'Caged' in Bristol, and the chassis were now largely computer-made and metric rather than imperial in their measurements. Other than that, the chassis were much the same as the 2004-onwards ones, albeit with some modifications in the engine bay area to accommodate the upcoming Sigma engines. The engines remained the Rover K-series for 2007.

== Move to Sigma Engines - 2008 ==
In 2008, Caterham moved from the K-series to the Ford Sigma engine, supplied in a 1.6 litre format. The Caged chassis was modified to incorporate the new engine (such as the exhaust exiting on the right via a 4-branch system with separate catalytic converter), and a number of new parts were manufactured.

The current Academy package (2014) is that for £21,495, entrants get a modified Roadsport kit (although a factory-built option is available for extra cost) with a sealed Ford Sigma engine and 5-speed gearbox. Having completed the ARDS (racing) licence qualification, the season then consists of a setup day, three speed events (sprints and hillclimbs), and four circuit races.

In recent years there have been 2 Academy groups, each of 28 drivers. For 2009, there were plans to run 3 groups of 28 entrants, but ultimately this did not come to pass. 2010's Academy also has two groups.

== Move to Horse Engines - 2026 ==
In 2025, Caterham announced that all Academy cars in the 2026 season will be powered by a 1.3L turbocharged engine supplied by Horse Technologies. The five-speed gearbox will also be replaced with a six-speed Mazda MX-5 geabox.

== Post-Academy Racing ==
There are now many racing choices available for cars and drivers who have completed the Academy, both in the Caterham Motorsport Ladder, the 7-Racing Championship and in the Caterham Graduates Racing Club.

A number of drivers leave the Caterham Academy and move on to other forms of racing like Megan Bruce who graduated from the Academy and moved to Formula racing, and an equal number sell up and never race again. But most move into either Roadsport B or Roadsport A or into Grads racing.
