= 2013 Marina Bay GP2 Series round =

(Singapore) 2013 Marina Bay GP2 round
Round details
- Round 10 of 11 rounds in the 2013 GP2 Series
- Layout of the Marina Bay street circuit
- Location: Marina Bay Street Circuit, Marina Bay, Singapore
- Course: Street circuit 5.065 km (3.147 mi)

GP2 Series

Feature race
- Date: 21 September 2013
- Laps: 28

Pole position
Driver	(United Kingdom) Jolyon Palmer	Carlin
- Time: 1:53.600

Podium
First	(United Kingdom) Jolyon Palmer	Carlin
Second	(Brazil) Felipe Nasr	Carlin
Third	(United Kingdom) James Calado	ART Grand Prix

Fastest lap
Driver	(New Zealand) Mitch Evans (Note: Mitch Evans set the fastest lap, but did not finish in the top 10, so was ineligible to be the point-scorer for the fastest lap. Jolyon Palmer was the point-scorer instead for setting the fastest lap of those finishing in the top 10.)	Arden International
- Time: 1:58.542 (on lap 21)

Sprint race
- Date: 22 September 2013
- Laps: 20

Podium
First	(United Kingdom) Sam Bird	Russian Time
Second	(Sweden) Marcus Ericsson	DAMS
Third	(Switzerland) Fabio Leimer	Racing Engineering

Fastest lap
Driver	(United Kingdom) Jolyon Palmer (Note: Jolyon Palmer set the fastest lap, but did not finish in the top 10, so was ineligible to be the point-scorer for the fastest lap. Marcus Ericsson was the point-scorer instead for setting the fastest lap of those finishing in the top 10.)	Carlin
- Time: 1:57.368 (on lap 14)

The 2013 the Marina Bay GP2 Series round was the tenth and penultimate round of the 2013 GP2 Series. It was held on 21 and 22 September 2013 at Marina Bay Street Circuit in Marina Bay, Singapore. The race supported the 2013 Singapore Grand Prix.

== Classification ==
=== Qualifying ===
Pos.	No.	Driver	Team	Time	Grid
1	10	(United Kingdom) Jolyon Palmer	Carlin	1:53.600	1
2	9	(Brazil) Felipe Nasr	Carlin	1:53.852	2
3	8	(Switzerland) Fabio Leimer	Racing Engineering	1:53.870	3
4	15	(United States) Alexander Rossi	Caterham Racing	1:54.285	4
5	2	(Monaco) Stephane Richelmi	DAMS	1:54.403	5
6	12	(France) Tom Dillmann	Russian Time	1:54.695	6
7	14	(Spain) Sergio Canamasas	Caterham Racing	1:54.812	7
8	3	(United Kingdom) James Calado	ART Grand Prix	1:54.822	8
9	1	(Sweden) Marcus Ericsson	DAMS	1:54.987	9
10	11	(United Kingdom) Sam Bird	Russian Time	1:55.163	10
11	18	(Monaco) Stefano Coletti	Rapax	1:55.251	11
12	7	(Colombia) Julián Leal	Racing Engineering	1:55.268	14
13	20	(France) Nathanael Berthon	Trident Racing	1:55.567	12
14	5	(Venezuela) Johnny Cecotto Jr.	Arden International	1:55.683	16
15	26	(Spain) Dani Clos	MP Motorsport	1:55.784	13
16	24	(Austria) Rene Binder	Venezuela GP Lazarus	1:55.880	15
17	4	(Germany) Daniel Abt	ART Grand Prix	1:56.048	17
18	22	(United Kingdom) Adrian Quaife-Hobbs	Hilmer Motorsport	1:56.057	18
19	16	(United States) Jake Rosenzweig	Barwa Addax Team	1:56.114	19
20	23	(United Kingdom) Jon Lancaster	Hilmer Motorsport	1:56.210	20
21	25	(Italy) Vittorio Ghirelli	Venezuela GP Lazarus	1:56.333	21
22	17	(Indonesia) Rio Haryanto	Barwa Addax Team	1:56.753	22
23	19	(Switzerland) Simon Trummer	Rapax	1:57.153	23
24	27	(Netherlands) Daniel de Jong	MP Motorsport	1:57.560	24
25	21	(Canada) Gianmarco Raimondo	Trident Racing	1:57.837	25
26	6	(New Zealand) Mitch Evans	Arden International	2:29.069	26

== Notes ==
Previous round: 2013 Monza GP2 round	GP2 Series; 2013 season	Next round: 2013 Yas Marina GP2 round
Previous round: 2012 Marina Bay GP2 round	Marina Bay GP2 round	Next round: None
