= Race of Remembrance =

Race of Remembrance is the brain child of Jon Earp, Mission Motorsport volunteer and a Welsh Air Ambulance pilot.

The race raised money for the Mission Motorsport charity, affiliated with Help for Heroes. Mission Motorsport are appointed by the British Army Motorsport Association, and operating in direct support of the Defence Recovery Capability, Mission Motorsport provides respite, rehabilitation, vocational support and training to those affected by military operations within the framework of Motorsport. Mission Motorsport concentrate on getting injured service personnel back into civilian life after injuries sustained on active duty.

An array of professional drivers showed their support of the charity, these include Tom Onslow-Cole Paul O’Neil, Dan Welch, Calum Lockie, Elliott Cole along with Mission Motorsport founder Major James Cameron and Jon Earp. Appearances also include ex professional footballer Luther Blissett and Radio Le Mans commentator John Hindhaugh.

The race was hosted by Anglesey Circuit and was also donated free by the track owners for the duration of the event.

The race paused at 10:45am on 9 November 2014 for a remembrance service held in the pit lane by army chaplain Reverend David Banbury. The 8 hour endurance race was the first in history to pause for a remembrance service midway through the race.

A documentary about the race - and the work of Mission Motorsport - "Race of Remembrance with Mazda" is to be broadcast on Sky 2, Sky Sports 1, 3 & 4 and Sky Sports F1 from Monday 23 February 2015. Presented by Richard Parks, produced by Princess Productions for Mazda UK.

== Class structure 2014 ==
Class A) Up to 2000cc (multi valve)

Class B) Up to 2000cc (2V per cylinder) or 1800cc (multi valve)

Class C) Up to 1800cc (2V per cylinder) or 1600cc (multi valve)

Class D) Below 1600cc (2V per cylinder) or 1400cc (multi valve)

== 2014 Results ==
Overall Results	Class A	Class B	Class C	Class D
1st STRATA 21; Tom Onslow-Cole; Jade Edwards; Paul White	1st PAUL SHEARD RACING 2 Darren Standing; Anthony Nield; Liam Murphy; Paul O'Neill	1st CWC RACING; Tom Halliwell; Colin Willmott; Conrad Porter	1st TEAM CATERHAM; Steve McCulley; Paul Aram; Matt Bird; Barry Moore	1st No Entries
2nd CTR MOTORSPORT; Richard Chamberlain; Matthew Chamberlain; John Atherton	2nd PAUL SHEARD RACING 1 Paul Sheard; Geoff Gouriet; Jim Hart; Nick Dougal	2nd DATUM MOTORSPORT; Phil Capstick; Ben Brooks; Lee Brooks	2nd ACADEMY MOTORSPORT 1 Chris Webster; Matt Nicoll-Jones; Mark Wania; James Harrison	2nd No Entries
3rd PAUL SHEARD RACING 2 Darren Standing; Anthony Nield; Liam Murphy; Paul O'Neill	3rd GGR MOTORSPORT; George Grant; Jonathan Cryer; Shaun Hollamby; Rob Boston	3rd ALFA 4000; Alistair Clark; Ben Broke Smith; James Webley; Fredrik Sorlie	3rd D & S MOTORSPORT; Daniel Stewart; Tom Pughe; Gianluca Maretto; Marco Aghem	3rd No Entries

== Class structure 2017 ==
Class A) Up to 1600cc

Class B) Citroen C1 Challenge

Class C) Caterham

Class D) Up to 1800cc

Class E) Up to 2000cc

Class F) Invitation

== 2017 Results ==
Overall Results	Class A	Class B	Class C	Class D	Class E	Class F
1st SOFA KING FAST; C. Everett; J. McCormack; C. Everett	1st MERLU MOTORSPORT; Marco Aghem; Davide Bernacchi; David Galliano; Dario Gambino	1st BS MOTORSPORT; Benjamin Short; Benjamin Hancy; Matthew Short	1st SOFA KING FAST; C. Everett; J. McCormack; C. Everett	1st DDCR RACING; D. Drinkwater; D. Collett; C. Brookson; R. Welsh	1st PAUL SHEARD RACING; Carl Garnett; Steve Doleman; Pete Edwards; Adam Bessel	1st RKC TGM; Ricky Coomber; Thomas Gannon; Mark Simmons
2nd CTS MOTORSPORT 1 Alex Jordan; Russ Olivant; Robb Watts	2nd RODDISON MOTORSPORT 2 Richard Smith; Matthew Tidmarsh; Nicholas Bailey; Timothy Orme	2nd PT SPORTSCARS 1 Charlie Martin; Andrew Faulkner; Justin Beadle; Thomas Clynes	2nd CTS MOTORSPORT 1 Alex Jordan; Russ Olivant; Robb Watts	2nd CW MOTORSPORT 2 Phil Dryburgh; Robert Dryburgh	2nd RODDISON MOTORSPORT 1 Paul Roddison; Dan Welch; Jon Halliwell	2nd BRITISH SPORT CAR SERVICES; N. Maduz; T. Gray; X. Brooke; A. Henderson; D. Judge
3rd CTS MOTORSPORT 2 Peter Reynolds; Peter Walters; Geoff Price	3rd MX5 OWNER CLUB 1 Brian Chandler; Tim Sturrar; Martin Morris; John Chambers	3rd ADVANTEC ENDURANCE RACING; Sean Whatley; Matt O'Hare; Chris Williams; Alistair Weaver	3rd CTS MOTORSPORT 2 Peter Reynolds; Peter Walters; Geoff Price	3rd CW MOTORSPORT 1 David Downie; Michael Downie; Craig Lockhart	3rd TEAM TWP; Nicholas Dougill; Graeme McMurchie; David Smith	3rd MISSION MOTORSPORT 1 J. Cameron; L. O'Conner; J. Allan Butterwoth; A. Goy
