= Caterham Graduates Racing Club =

British motor-racing club

Caterham Graduates Racing Club is a British motor-racing club for privateer racing drivers in Caterham Seven type cars.

== History ==
The Caterham Graduates Championship was started in 1998 by competitors from the 1997 Caterham Scholarship (subsequently Caterham Academy). For the first year it was called the Graduate 797 series (the first "7" for Caterham Seven, and "97" from the year that most drivers started competing). In its first two years, it was a multi-discipline series, with the rounds being made up of sprints (single car on track, against the clock), hillclimbs, and circuit races, similar to the Caterham Scholarship format. The emphasis moved more and more towards circuit races, and from 2000-on the series has been entirely circuit races.

In 2001, following the Caterham Academy's change to Rover-engined cars, the championship launched a second class named Super Graduates, based upon an uprated K-Series Academy car.

In 2003, the Super Graduates class was further upgraded and renamed the Mega Graduates. A replacement Super Graduates class was created to accommodate standard ex-Academy cars with Rover K-series engines.

In 2007, the "Graduates" class was rebranded "Classic Graduates".

In 2010, Ford Sigma-engined cars were introduced as a sub-class of Super Graduates. From 2011 onwards, the Sigma cars have been a separate, 4th championship class.

In 2013, a 5th championship class was introduced for variants of the Ford Sigma-engined cars - SigMax. This allows suspension and engine upgrades in line with the Caterham Tracksport and Supersport series.

In 2019, the Super Graduates class was discontinued and merged into the Mega Graduate class. New classes were introduced for variable camshaft Sigma engines, 135 and 150 classes corresponding to 270R and 310R in the Caterham Motorsport series.

In 2020, the Mega Graduate class was merged into the SigMax class by allowing for the fitting of an LSD. The championships did not take place due to the Covid pandemic in the UK, but one-off events were able to be run when restrictions eased.

In 2021, Classic Graduates were discontinued leaving 135, 150 and SigMax classes. The CGRC Trophy (a 3 round-mini champship) was also introduced.

In 2023, the Sigmax class was merged into the Sigma 150 category.

The series is one of the largest in the UK, if not the largest, with well over 100 registered competitors. The competitors come from a variety of backgrounds - a number have "graduated" from the novice Caterham Scholarship and Academy series, whilst many others have made it their first foray into motorsport.

== Racing ==
The Caterham Graduates race series takes place over 7 race meetings each year at UK and European motor racing circuits. The races are usually run over 20–30 minutes and the leading car across the line after the time has expired is the winner. Wherever possible, each class has its own grids, but for the European round, the grid is usually shared by the two CGRC classes. The events are typified by close wheel to wheel racing, often having several lead changes on the same lap.

Championship points are awarded thus: 30 for a win, 28 for 2nd place, 27 for 3rd place, right down to 2 points for finishing 28th or lower. And even a driver who fails to finish will still earn one point. A point is also awarded for the fastest lap in each race. At the end of the season, drivers drop their lowest three scores, to allow for missing a race or two, or a "DNF" (did not finish). For the purpose of calculating championship points, only championship members are relevant i.e. Trophy and Guest members are ignored.

As well as the full championship, the club also runs the Trophy for drivers who are unable to commit to a full season of racing. At the start of the season, Trophy members pick which 3 of the 7 CGRC race meetings are to be counted as their Trophy rounds. Scoring is as per championship scoring, but both Championship and Trophy members are taken into consideration when calculating scoring i.e. only Guest members are ignored.

CGRC also welcomes guest members with eligible cars. Guest members do not pay a membership fee but do pay a slightly higher race entry fee. Guest members are eligible for race trophies but cannot score points towards the Championship or Trophy.

In addition to the standard Motorsport UK rules, the club operates a Driving Standards Team (DST), made up of respected club racers and ex-racers, which ensures that the close racing is fair and safe for all. The DST exists to educate and advise drivers in all matters relating to driving standards, as well as issuing penalties where necessary.

The club's racing is organised through the BARC.

== Car Specifications ==
The cars in the series are fundamentally road-legal, albeit with the removal of lights, and some are even driven to and (hopefully) from races. Many are used by drivers during the week for commuting and shopping, requiring no more than covering the competition numbers to make them road-legal.

No changes from the standard specification are allowed, putting the emphasis firmly on driving ability rather than car development and set-up. Along with low consumable costs, this keeps the costs of running a car very much under control, making it one of the most cost-effective ways to go racing. The large grid sizes are a testament to this low-cost formula.

All cars must run on Toyo R888R tyres in 185/60R13 size and in GG compound. Championship drivers are limited to 3 sets of tyres per year and Trophy drivers may use up to 2 sets. Tyre usage is monitored via a barcoding system.

Current classes are:

=== Sigma 135 (270R, Roadsport, Modified Roadsport and Academy) ===
Uses the Ford Sigma engine with TiVCT variable valve timing, as adopted by the Caterham Academy from 2014 onwards. The specification mirrors the 270R specification in Caterham Motorsport. Power is 135 hp.

This class also includes:

- Caterham Roadsport
- Modified Roadsport (Lights removed & Windscreen replaced with Aeroscreen)
- Caterham Academy

All of which can be fully upgraded to Sigma 135 specification.

Many of the upgrades are optional (wide track suspension, quick steering rack, brake bias valve and race dampers/springs) so you need not do everything at once (or at all).

A Sigma 135 can be later upgraded to Sigma 150 specification.

=== Sigma 150 (310R and Sigmax) ===
Upgraded from the Sigma 135 (270R) class, the Sigma 150 class mirrors the 310R specification in Caterham Motorsport. Upgrades include a limited slip differential, lightened flywheel and a further engine tune with different camshafts and remapped ignition. Power is 152 hp.

Also included in the 150 class are the older fixed cam Supersport/Sigmax specification cars.

== Affordability and Technical Support ==
Affordability is a key ingredient to Caterham Graduates racing. Strict regulations allow only limited modifications and work on the sealed engines is limited to nominated engine builders.

Other ways the club promotes affordability include limiting the amount of tyres the drivers can use through the season, providing race-day catering as part of the drivers' entry fees, and encouraging drivers either to stay on-site at the circuits or in budget hotels locally. Wherever possible, a low-priced "free practice" session is available before qualifying, so drivers can familiarise themselves with the circuit without having to book a full day of testing before the meeting.

== Race Numbers ==
Drivers may choose their race number, with first refusal for each number being given to the driver who used it in the previous season.

Special numbers which are not available for drivers to choose are number 1 and number 7. Number 1 is given to one of the previous season's champions (decided by a ballot into which each class's champion is entered). Number 7 is given to the winner of the previous season's Martin Kay Trophy, which is awarded by the club's board of directors to the driver who typifies the spirit of the club with their pure joy of racing.

== Previous Championship Winners ==
Taken from the CGRC website

Year	Class	Champion	Runner-up	Third
2024	Sigma 150	Jamie Ellwood	Matthew Willoughby	Bren Maude
2024	Sigma 135	Paul Goldstein	Thomas Gunter	Giles Derry
2023	Sigma 150	Harry Senior	Harry Cramer	James McCall
2023	Sigma 135	Ben Wheatley	Richard Groom	Giles Derry
2023	SigMax	Daniel Livingstone	Stephen Arnell	Gareth Cordey
2022	Sigma 150	Harry Senior	Ben Winrow	Stephen Clark
2022	Sigma 135	Jamie Winrow	James McCall	Richard Groom
2022	SigMax	Max Haynes	Andy Molsom	Kevin Barrett
2021	Sigma 150	Jamie Ellwood	Harry Cramer	Andrew Whitton
2021	Sigma 135	James McCall	Alaric Barney	Neal Evans
2021	SigMax	Harry Senior	Stephen Clark	Ben Winrow
2020	CANCELLED (COVID)			
2019	Sigma 150	Barry White	Luke Balmforth	Andrew Johnson
2019	Sigma 135	Adam Harrison	Neil Wright	David Morris
2019	SigMax	Samuel Wilson	Stephen Clark	Steve Mcmaster
2019	Mega	Kevin Barrett	Kim Rayment	Neil Sturgess
2019	Classic	Robin Webb	Mark Carter	Trevor Harber
2018	SigMax Graduates	Jamie Ellwood	Oliver Gibson	Jamie Winrow
2018	Mega Graduates	Declan Dolan	Ben Winrow	Simon Griffiths
2018	Sigma Graduates	Jon Curry	David Morris	Rob Winrow
2018	Classic Graduates	Matthew Willoughby	Robin Web	Mac Noaro
2017	SigMax Graduates	Oliver Gibson	Jamie Ellwood	James Russell
2017	Mega Graduates	Declan Dolan	Glenn Burtenshaw	Roger Ford
2017	Super Graduates	Toby Briant	Andy Molsom	Barry White
2017	Sigma Graduates	Jon Harmer	Ben Winrow	David Morris
2017	Classic Graduates	Graeme Smith	Robin Webb	Peter Tattersall
2016	SigMax Graduates	Dylan Stanley	Lee Bristow	Scott Lawrence
2016	Mega Graduates	Oliver Gibson	Luke Cooper	Glenn Burtenshaw
2016	Super Graduates	Ed Benson	Toby Briant	Andy Molsom
2016	Sigma Graduates	David Webber	Jamie Winrow	Jason Gale
2016	Classic Graduates	Steve McMaster	Graeme Smith	Robin Webb
2015	SigMax Graduates	Neil Shinner	Dylan Stanley	Mick Whitehead
2015	Mega Graduates	Oliver Gibson	Glenn Burtenshaw	Andy Skinner
2015	Super Graduates	Toby Briant	Martin Kay	Gareth Cordey
2015	Sigma Graduates	Nigel Board	Jason Gale	Andrew Outterside
2015	Classic Graduates	Graham Smith	Steve McMaster	Trevor Harber
2014	SigMax Graduates	Jeremy Webb	Mick Whitehead	Neil Shinner
2014	Mega Graduates	Adrian Russell	Brett Ray	Tom Overton
2014	Super Graduates	Toby Briant	Martin Kay	Jonathan Miller
2014	Sigma Graduates	Tristan Judge	Scott Lawrence	Zoltan Csabai
2014	Classic Graduates	Graham Smith	Stu Thompson	Graeme Smith
2013	SigMax Graduates	Jeremy Webb	Ian Anderson	Mick Whitehead
2013	Mega Graduates	Jamie Ellwood	Adrian Russell	Dave Hewitt
2013	Super Graduates	Dylan Stanley	Toby Briant	Gareth Cordey
2013	Sigma Graduates	Amanda Black	Steve Humphreys	Yolande Humphreys
2013	Classic Graduates	Graham Smith	Andrew Outterside	Stu Thompson
2012	Mega Graduates	Myles Packman	Nick Haryett	Nick Frost
2012	Super Graduates	Dylan Stanley	Neil Shinner	Toby Briant
2012	Sigma Graduates	Ian Anderson	Ian Dyble	Bill Scott
2012	Classic Graduates	Dave Pearson	Justin Cox	Graeme Smith
2011	Mega Graduates	Myles Packman	Mick Whitehead	Paul Manyweathers
2011	Super Graduates	Reece Somerfield	Dylan Stanley	Neil Shinner
2011	Sigma Graduates	Ian Anderson	Ian Dyble	John Gil
2011	Classic Graduates	John Parker	Rowan Williams	Graeme Smith
2010	Mega Graduates	Paul Turley	Myles Packman	David Shaw
2010	Super Graduates	James Sibbet	Jamie Waring	Daniel Malkin
2010	Sigma Graduates	Reece Somerfield	John Gil	Ian Dyble
2010	Classic Graduates	Graeme Smith	Charles Fitzhugh	John Parker
2009	Mega Graduates	Jamie Ellwood	James Barlow	Adrian Russell
2009	Super Graduates	Trevor Newman	David Pearce	Mick Whitehead
2009	Classic Graduates	Flick Haigh	Graeme Smith	Adam Bettinson
2008	Mega Graduates	Jamie Ellwood	Andrew Ennis	George Longmuir
2008	Super Graduates	Trevor Newman	Edward Benson	James Sibbet
2008	Classic Graduates	Graeme Smith	Adam Bettinson	Charles Fitzhugh
2007	Mega Graduates	Jamie Ellwood	Oliver Jackson	Mike Welburn
2007	Super Graduates	Andrew Vickers	Andrew Ennis	James Sibbet
2007	Classic Graduates	Graeme Smith	Trevor Newman	Jonathan Vamplew
2006	Mega Graduates	Guy Halley	Martin Amison	Paul Hudson
2006	Super Graduates	Charlie Hunt	Trevor Newman	Andrew Ennis
2006	Graduates	Graeme Smith	Andrew Smith	Andy Coombs
2005	Mega Graduates	Matthew Burrows	Martin Amison	George Longmuir
2005	Super Graduates	Jamie Ellwood	Rory Young	Paul Manyweathers
2005	Graduates	Martin Oxborough	Graeme Smith	Rob Draper
2004	Mega Graduates	Jamie Ellwood	Chris Batten	Guy Halley
2004	Super Graduates	Malcolm Barnett	Nick Haryett	Matthew Gillbanks
2004	Graduates	Andy Adshead	Toby Briant	Garry Kennedy
2003	Super Graduates A (Mega Graduates)	Simon Lambert	Jamie Ellwood	Steve Knox
2003	Super Graduates B (Super Graduates)	Andy Baylie	Russell Veitch	Alan Williamson
2003	Graduates	Charlie Hunt	Edward Chinn	James Campbell
2002	Super Graduates	Simon Lambert	Jon Barnes	Mac Apostolides
2002	Graduates	Rachel Green	Steve Knox	George Longmuir
2001	Super Graduates	Nelson Rowe	Rupert Whyte	Steve Ruston
2001	Graduates	Jamie Ellwood	Paul Manyweathers	Timothy Evans
2000	Graduates	David Williams	Rupert Whyte	Steve Ruston
1999	Graduates	David Williams	Christian Marryat	Roger Wilkin
1998	Graduates	David Williams	Nick Haryett	Nick Frost

== Previous Trophy Winners ==
Taken from the CGRC website

Year	Class	Champion	Runner-up	Third
2024	Sigma 150	Will Stilwell	Ian Anderson	Max Haynes
2024	Sigma 135	Jamie Winrow	Tom McEwing	Richard Groom
2023	NOT RUN			
2022	Sigma 150	Allan Curtis	Geoff Newman	Paul Fielder
2022	Sigma 135	Tom Power	Robin Webb	Paul Farrell
2022	Sigmax	Glenn Burtenshaw	Danny Scarborough	Philip Isherwood-Crook
2021	Sigma 150	Jim Irlam	Andy Ebdon	Jon Curry
2021	Sigma 135	Simon Shaw	Tom Power	Chris Skillicorn
2021	Sigmax	Adam Croft	Kevin Barrett	

== Notable Past Champions ==
- 2001 Super Graduate champion Nelson Rowe, who went on to win Caterham Roadsports A in 2002 and won the 2007 UK Historic Formula Ford Championship.
- 2002 Super Graduate runner-up Jon Barnes, winner of the 2004 Caterham Eurocup series, the 2005 Caterham Masters championship, the 2006 Formula Palmer Audi championship and the 2008 British GT Championship.
- 2002 Graduates Champion Rachel Green - the first woman to win a one-make Caterham championship, and twice winner of the Lord Wakefield trophy. The award is given for "outstanding achievement by a woman in motorsport worldwide."
- 2006 Mega Graduate champion Guy Halley, who competed in the SEAT Cupra Championship, a support championship to the British Touring Car Championship.
- 2007 Mega Graduate runner-up Ollie Jackson, who won the 2010 Pro-Am category of the Porsche Carrera Cup, drove the Lotus Evora GT4 in the 2011 British GT Championship, the Triple Eight Vauxhall Vectra in the 2011 British Touring Car Championship and the Century Motorsport Ginetta GT55 in the 2015 Ginetta GT4 Supercup.
- Multiple Classic, Super and Mega Graduate champion Jamie Ellwood, now a race-winner in the Caterham Superlight R300 championship. Jamie has won a total of 10 CGRC Championships and is the only person to have won all of the Graduates Club classes in which he has competed. He is quoted by Caterham Cars as "the most successful Caterham racer ever".
- 2009 Classic Graduate Champion Flick Haigh, who won the championship in an exciting final round decider at a very wet Spa Francorchamps. Flick is the second female champion in the club's history, following Rachel Green's triumph in 2002. After racing in the Caterham R300 championship, she is now driving an Optimum Motorsport Ginetta GT55 in the 2015 Ginetta GT4 Supercup.

== Sponsors ==
About a dozen or so companies have their branding across each of the 100-plus racecars, and on the club's website www.cgrc.uk.

Relatively few of the drivers have individual sponsors, although this is permitted.
