= Caterham Racing =

Practice of racing Caterham Seven-type sportscars

Caterham Racing is the practice of racing Caterham Seven-type sportscars.

== History ==
The Caterham Seven (or Caterham 7) is a small sports car produced by Caterham Cars in the United Kingdom. It is based on the Lotus Seven, a lightweight sports car sold in kit and pre-built form by Lotus Cars, from the late 1950s to the early 1970s. After Lotus ended production of the Lotus Seven, in 1972, Caterham bought the rights to the design, and today make both kits and fully assembled cars. 2007 marked the 50th year of production of the Lotus/Caterham 7.

The Lotus 7 was conceived by Colin Chapman as a car to be raced. Whilst still a prototype, in September 1957, it was raced at the Brighton Speed Trials and by the end of 1958 Graham Hill was winning races with the Coventry Climax-engined 'Super Seven' The car has had a strong racing history throughout its life under both Lotus and Caterham stewardship. Amongst the marques more famous races was victory in the Nelson Ledges 24-hour race in Ohio when, against a field including works teams from Honda and Mazda, a four-man team from Caterham (including both Jez Coates and Robert Nearn) won by seven laps (after 990 laps) in a modified Vauxhall HPC.

After dominating open class races for decades a one-make championship for Caterhams was begun in 1986 and won by Kelvin Foy. Caterham 7 races have since expanded to include club and competitive races in the United Kingdom, continental Europe, Canada, the United States and Asia.

The car was banned from racing in the US in the 1960s, as being "Too fast to race" and again in the UK in the 1970s for the same reasons, which prompted Caterham Cars boss Graham Nearn to produce 'T' shirts with "Caterham Seven, the car that's "Too Fast to Race. ..". Both bans were later lifted. In 2002, an R400 won its class (and came 11th overall out of 200 starters) at the 24 Hours Nürburgring race by 10 laps, ahead of competition that included Porsche and BMW racecars, leading, once again, to a ban on entry in subsequent years.

== Current Caterham Racing ==
There are many Caterham Racing Championships across the world, the majority administered in some way by Caterham Cars. It is estimated that there are over 700 competitors in 20 Caterham championships across 11 countries, and many more that compete in sprint and hillclimb events.

=== The Caterham Motorsport Ladder ===
The Caterham Motorsport Ladder is a progression through the various Caterham Cars championships, starting with the Caterham Academy, and moving through ultimately to their most prestigious European events. The championships which form the ladder are:

==== Caterham Academy Championship ====
In 1995, the Caterham Academy, a novices-only format, was introduced in the UK as the Caterham Scholarship. For £26,495 (2019 price), entrants get a modified Roadsport kit (a factory-built option is available for extra cost) with a sealed Ford Sigma engine and 5-speed gearbox. Having completed the ARDS (racing) licence qualification, the season then consists of a setup day, one speed events (sprints and hillclimbs), and six circuit races.

Since 2000, the popularity of the academy has led to Caterham providing two parallel Academy championships (Group Green & Group White), each resulting in an academy champion at the end of the year. Approximately 1,000 racing drivers have been created through the Caterham Academy.

Over the course of the 2019 Academy season, the white group drivers recorded substantially quicker times than their green group counterparts.

| Year | 1st | 2nd | 3rd |
| 2019 (White Group) | Tom Wyllys | Blair McConachie | James Fowler |
| 2019 (Green Group) | Alexander Conway | James Venning | Dimitris Melas |

Academy Lap Records
| Circuit | Driver | Time | Date |
|---|---|---|---|
| Anglesey International GP | Lee Wiggins | 01:48.807 | 28/06/09 |
| Brands Hatch Indy | Michael Gazda | 56:085 | 04/08/12 |
| Cadwell Park | Blair McConachie | 01:43.612 | 11/05/19 |
| Castle Combe | Mitt Assi | 01:19.560 | 11/08/18 |
| Croft | James Beardwell | 01:39.769 | 10/09/16 |
| Donington Park National | Nick Horton | 01:24.217 | 14/07/13 |
| Donington Park GP | Daniel Halstead | 01:53.895 | 09/07/17 |
| Mallory Park | Jay Gardner | 58:04.800 | 27/09/09 |
| Oulton Park International | Tom Wyllys | 02:01.729 | 01/06/19 |
| Silverstone National | Harry Eyre | 01:09.318 | 14/09/19 |
| Silverstone International | Matt Sheppard | 01:20.449 | 14/10/17 |
| Silverstone GP | Brad Smith | 02:38.129 | 30/09/11 |
| Snetterton 200 | Michael Gazda | 01:28.052 | 02/09/12 |
| Snetterton 300 | Daniel French | 02:17.593 | 05/08/17 |
| Thruxton | Tom Power | 01:31.941 | 01/09/18 |

==== Caterham Roadsport Championship ====
The Caterham Roadsport Championship is largely for drivers that have come through the previous season's Academy. Some minor modifications are permitted to the car, including fitting a rear anti-roll bar and sticky Avon ZZS tyres. Technical support is still provided by the factory, and professional team support is not permitted. The season features 20-minute races at 7 'double-header' meetings. One of the rounds takes place at a European circuit with recent visits to Zolder, Zandvoort, Spa-Francorchamps and Nürburgring. Since 2009, the Caterham Roadsport Championship will be available exclusively to Sigma-engined cars.

==== Caterham Seven 270R Championship ====
Caterham 270R cars are still ex-Academy cars. However they feature the upgrades for the Caterham Roadsport Championship car plus a number of performance upgrades such removing the windscreens and lights, widetrack front suspension, uprated dampers and a raised rev limit. Professional team support is also allowed. The Caterham Seven 270R Championship races at the same events as Caterham Roadsport, but has longer 30-minute races.

| Year | 1st | 2nd | 3rd |
| 2014 | Steve Nuttall | Andres Sinclair | Nick Portlock |
| 2013 | Michael Gazda | - | - |
| 2012 | David Robinson | Terry Langley | Jon Mortimer |

==== Caterham Seven 310R Championship ====
Caterham Seven 310R cars are the 'ultimate' incarnation of the Caterham Academy car. They feature all the upgrades of Roadsport and Seven 270R and also feature a limited slip differential and a power increase. In 2017, the 310R was introduced to replace the outgoing Supersport cars and both cars ran in separate championships before the Supersport series was disbanded before the start of the 2018 season.

| Year | 1st | 2nd | 3rd |
| 2014 | Mike Hart | James Robinson | Jon Mortimer |
| 2013 | David Robinson | Mike Hart | Lee Wiggins |

==== Caterham Seven Championship UK ====
The Seven 420R (formerly known as Superlight R300 and later 420R) was introduced in 2009 and is now the premier class of the Caterham Motorsport ladder. The car is unique on the ladder in that it is not an evolution of the Caterham Academy car but instead is a unique chassis and uses the 2.0l Ford Duratec engine as opposed to the Ford Sigma engine used in the other series in the ladder. 2014 saw the introduction of an optional 6-speed sequential gearbox.

| Year | 1st | 2nd | 3rd |
| 2015 | David Robinson | TBC | TBC |
| 2014 | Aaron Head | David Robinson | Danny Winstanley |
| 2013 | Ollie Taylor | Terry Langley | Stuart Leonard |

=== Caterham Graduates Racing Club ===
==== Background ====
The Caterham Graduates Championship was started in 1998 by competitors who participated in the 1997 Caterham Scholarship (as it was called at that time); back then there was no follow on championship/ladder so the Graduates provided a much-needed home for these drivers and their cars to continue racing together in a one-make championship.

In its first two years it was a multi-discipline series with the rounds being made up of sprints, hillclimbs and circuit races, similar to the Caterham Scholarship format. The emphasis moved more and more towards circuit races, and from 2000-on the series has been entirely circuit races.

The Club grew significantly as a result of the influx of members as subsequent Scholarship/Academy years naturally flowed into Graduates, and the class structure of the club continued to evolve to allow both older and current generation caterhams to compete. This tradition continues today, with classes for more modern cars following the specification of the current Caterham Motorsport 270R and 310R classes but still allowing Sigmax, Roadsport and even Academy specification cars to compete.

The Grads (as they are affectionately known) are independent of the Caterham Motorsport Ladder, run by members for members on a not for profit basis (with a member-elected, unpaid board). Off-circuit the club works to promote a friendly/sociable paddock, with frequent formal and informal social events; on-circuit the focus is on fun, fair, close and competitive Caterham racing where the cars come back into the paddock under their own power and with all of the same parts still attached in the condition they went out in.

To make sure that happens CGRC have a Driving Standards Team (DST) in place to supplement the clerk at each race meeting. Members of the DST are available at race meetings for consultation on a particular issue and any club member can lodge an investigation request to the DST about driving standards which is then fully investigated. The DST brief new members to the club, offering advice/guidance, but also have a range of sanctions available, including ultimately the suspension of racing membership.

The series is one of the largest in the UK with well over 100 registered competitors. The club draws its membership from Caterham Motorsport, novice racers (including some ex karters), other types of racing and CGRC alumni (many of which have raced with the club for years). - previous racing members include Jon Barnes (British GT Champion and current Caterham test driver and 2002 Super Graduates runner up), current BTCC driver Oli Jackson, and Caterham's own Simon Lambert (2002 Super Graduates Champion). Caterham technician Lee Bristow (310R Champion 2017) raced in SigMax in 2016 and was runner up in the Championship.

==== Classes ====
Current classes are:

===== Sigma 150 (310R and Sigmax) =====
Based on the Caterham Motorsport 310R specification with the 1600cc Ford Sigma TiVCT (generating approx. 150 bhp) with limited slip differential and wide track suspension.

A Sigma 135 (2014 onwards) can be upgraded to this specification.

From 2024 the Sigmax class has been merged into Sigma 150; Sigmax cars are an upgrade of the 1600cc Ford Sigma engine Caterham Roadsport cars from 2008 – 2013 to Caterham Supersport specification, incorporating engine modifications (approx. 140bhp), limited slip differential and wide track suspension.

===== Sigma 135 (270R, Roadsport, Modified Roadsport and Academy) =====
Based on the Caterham Motorsport 270R specification with the 1600cc Ford Sigma TiVCT (generating approx. 135 bhp) with optional wide track suspension.

This class also includes:

Caterham Roadsport Modified Roadsport (Lights removed & Windscreen replaced with Aeroscreen) Caterham Academy All of which can be fully upgraded to Sigma 135 specification. Many of the upgrades are optional (wide track suspension, quick steering rack, brake bias valve and race dampers/springs) so you need not do everything at once (or at all).

A Sigma 135 can be later upgraded to Sigma 150 specification.

All Caterham Graduate classes run on the Toyo Tyres R888R road-legal track tyre (185/60 R13).

The cars in the series have been on the road and indeed a few are driven to from races.

No changes from the standard specification are allowed, tyre limits are enforced and all have sealed engine units putting the emphasis firmly on driving ability rather than car modification. Along with low consumable costs, this keeps the costs of running a car very much under control thus making it one of the most cost-effective ways to go racing. The large grid sizes are a testament to this low-cost formula.

=== Other Caterham Championships around the world ===
There are a large number of championships around the world both exclusively for Caterham Seven cars, and in which Caterhams compete alongside other cars. Caterham Academies have been introduced in the Netherlands, Portugal, France and other countries.

==== Caterham Challenge France ====
The French Caterham series comprises Academy and 420R classes. They race around many iconic French race circuit throughout the calendar year.

| Year | 1st | 2nd | 3rd |
| 2021 | TBC | TBC | TBC |
| 2020 | Henri Bizet | Eric Moussier | Pascal Wehrlen |
| 2019 | Pascal Wehrlen | Eric Moussier | Henri Bizet |
| 2018 | Miquel Antoine | Henri Bizet | Pascal Wehrlen |

==== Caterham Challenge LATAM ====
The Latin American Caterham Challenge series started in 2015 and was active until 2019. Caterham Seven 310R were used for the first 3 years and replaced by the 420R for the 2018 season. It was the top tier racing series within LaMonomarca which also hosted supporting series within. Drivers across Latin America competed and winners from foreign Caterham Championships were invited to participate.

For the 2018 season it merged with Campeonato Nacional De Automovilismo (CNA) and the drivers competed against each other within their own Caterham category as well as the other cars in the overall race.

| Year | 1st | 2nd | 3rd |
| 2017 | Juan Gonzalez | Camilo Forrero | Andres Ceballos |
| 2016 | Juan Gonzalez | Camilo Forrero | Andres Ceballos |
| 2015 | Juan Gonzalez | Diego Moran | Sebastian Alborta |

==== Intercity Platinum Cup Turkey ====
The Turkish Caterham series started in 2018 using the Caterham Seven 420R and takes place at Istanbul Park racing circuit.

| Year | 1st | 2nd | 3rd |
| 2021 | TBC | TBC | TBC |
| 2018 | Sinan Ciftci | Emir Ay | Can Celebi |
