= 2010 Bahrain International Circuit GP2 Asia Series round =

There were two GP2 Asia Series rounds at the Bahrain International Circuit in 2010:

- 2010 Bahrain International Circuit GP2 Asia Series round (February)
- 2010 Bahrain International Circuit GP2 Asia Series round (March)
