= Jake Rosenzweig =

English-American racing driver (born 1989)

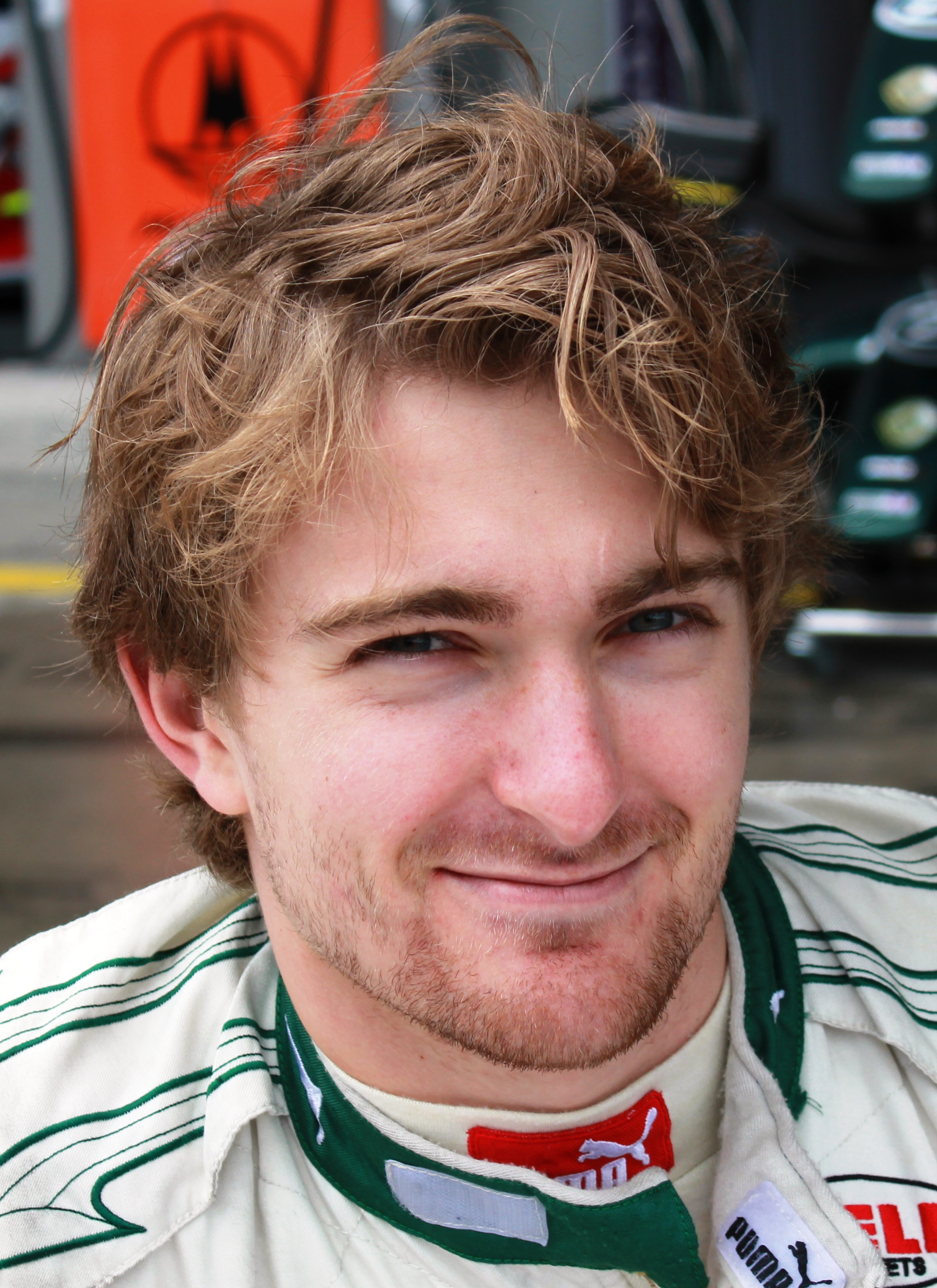
- Rosenzweig at the 2011 Nürburgring World series by Renault round
- Nationality: American
- Born: 14 April 1989 (age 37) London, England

GP2 Series career
- Debut season: 2012
- Current team: Barwa Addax Team
- Car number: 16
- Starts: 26
- Wins: 0
- Poles: 0
- Fastest laps: 0
- Best finish: 28th in 2013

Previous series
- 2010–12 2010 2009–10 2009 2009 2008–09 2008 2008 2008: Formula Renault 3.5 Series; Auto GP; GP2 Asia Series; Formula 3 Euro Series; British Formula 3 Porsche Carrera Cup GB; Formula Renault 2.0 WEC; Eurocup Formula Renault 2.0; Rolex Sports Car Series

Jake Rosenzweig (born April 14, 1989 in London) is an English-born American former racing driver.

== Career ==
=== Karting ===
Much of Rosenzweig's early karting career was contested in the United Kingdom, with him competing in Super 1 karting championships. In 2001, Rosenzweig finished fifth in the Cadet Championship, having been outside the top thirty positions the previous season. 2002 saw Rosenzweig step up to JICA karts, again competing in the Super 1 championship, staying there for two seasons with an additional shot at the Andrea Margutti Trophy in 2004.

After a season out in 2005, Rosenzweig moved up to ICA karts for the 2006 season. Rosenzweig contested the Stars of Karting championship in the United States, finishing eighth overall in the championship standings. He also made appearances in the WSK International Series and Italian Open Masters, scoring nine points in both series. Rosenzweig remained in the States to contest the most part of his 2007 karting campaign, claiming both the ICA Florida Winter Tour and the Canadian ICC Championship, and finished runner-up in two other championships – Stars of Karting National and East series – losing out to British racer Scott Jenkins on both occasions. He also finished thirteenth at the SuperNationals event in Las Vegas, Nevada, beating the likes of Raphael Matos and Phil Giebler.

=== Formula Renault ===
After contesting the 2008 24 Hours of Daytona for Alegra Motorsports, Rosenzweig stepped up to Formula Renault, moving to the Epsilon Euskadi team and contesting both the Eurocup and the new-for-2008 West European Cup. In the Eurocup, Rosenzweig finished all bar one race, and recorded two points-scoring finishes – tenth-place finishes at Le Mans and Barcelona – en route to a 28th-place finish in the final championship standings. In the WEC, Rosenzweig was a regular points-scoring finisher, finishing eight of the fifteen races in such a position. At season's end, Rosenzweig finished in a tie with Spain's Miquel Monrás on thirty points, with the Spanish driver earning eighth place via a best finish of third at Valencia compared to Rosenzweig's best finish of fifth at Estoril. Rosenzweig contested six races of the Porsche Carrera Cup Great Britain for Team Parker Racing, and despite not being able to amass championship points, Rosenzweig impressed including setting the fastest lap during the first race at the season finale at Brands Hatch.

=== Formula Three ===
Rosenzweig moved up to Formula Three for 2009, contesting the Formula Three Euroseries for Carlin Motorsport. Rosenzweig finished just three of the races in the top ten positions, but one of those was a podium at Zandvoort. Starting second on the grid, Rosenzweig ran behind Sam Bird in second place, but both men were passed by Bird's team-mate Jules Bianchi. He also made a guest appearance in the British Formula 3 Championship, guesting at the Spa round for Carlin. He finished fifth in race one, before failing to finish in the second race. In the non-championship races at Zandvoort and Macau, Rosenzweig finished 29th in the Netherlands, while he failed to finish at Macau due to a first lap crash. He again contested six races of the Porsche Carrera Cup Great Britain for Team Parker Racing.

=== GP2 Series ===
Rosenzweig tested a GP2 car for Super Nova Racing during the mass test at Circuit Paul Ricard in November 2009. He would later join the team for the final two rounds of the 2009–10 GP2 Asia Series, replacing Marcus Ericsson alongside Josef Král.

Rosenzweig made his main series début in the non-championship GP2 Final in 2011 with the Super Nova team. He returned to the series for the penultimate round of the 2012 championship at Monza, replacing Josef Král in the Addax team, alongside Johnny Cecotto Jr.

=== Formula Renault 3.5 Series ===
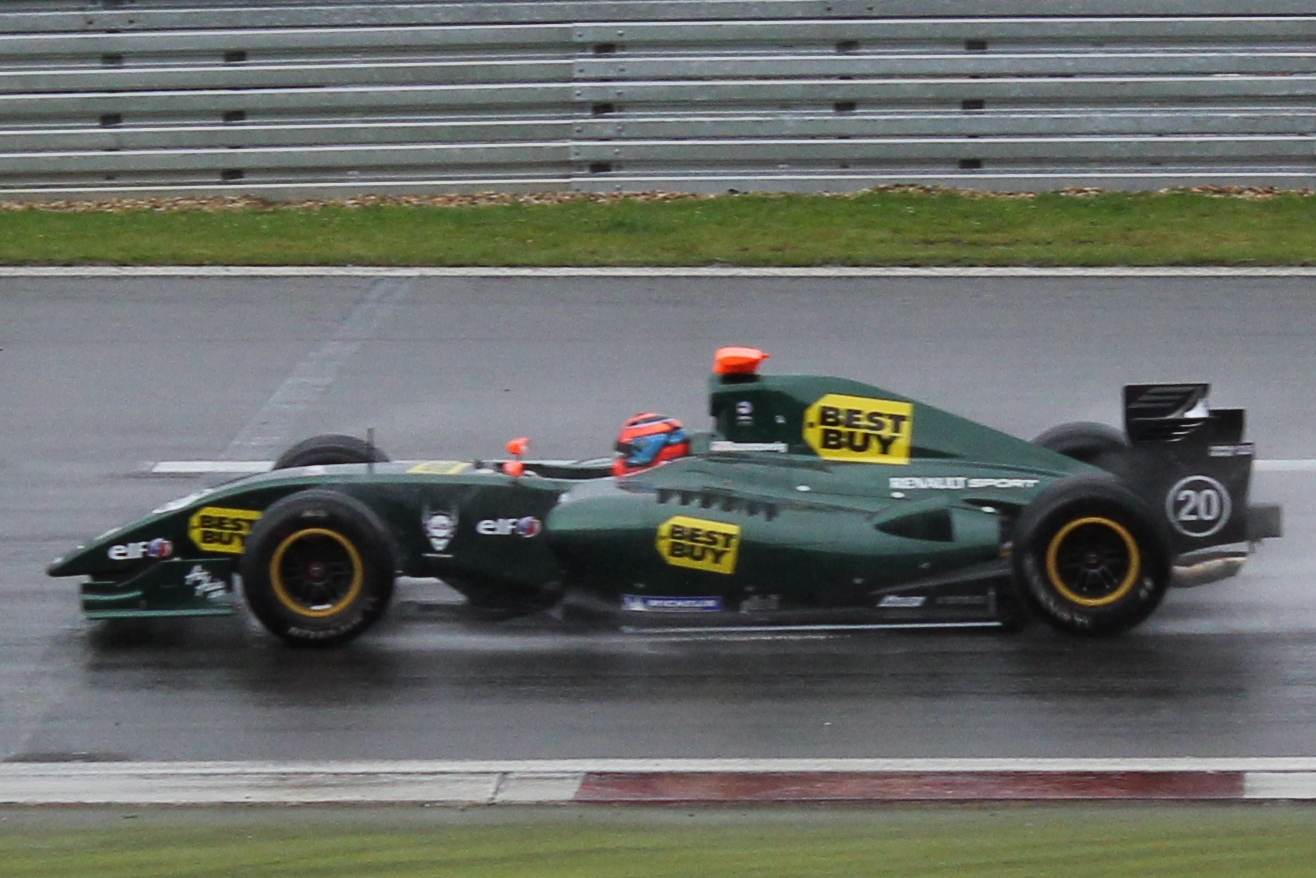
Jake Rosenzweig at the 2011 Nürburgring World series by Renault round

Rosenzweig moved into the Formula Renault 3.5 Series for the 2010 season, remaining with his Euroseries team, Carlin. He joined Mikhail Aleshin at the team. He finished in 19th place in the drivers' championship, with a best finish of seventh in the season-opener at Aragón. He also made a guest appearance in the Auto GP series with Super Nova.

Rosenzweig remained in the series for 2011, moving to the Mofaz Racing team where he was partnered with first Chris van der Drift and later Fairuz Fauzy. He improved to 15th in the championship with a brace of fourth places at Ricard. He moved to the ISR Racing team for the 2012 season, alongside Sam Bird.

== Racing record ==
=== Career summary ===
Season	Series	Team	Races	Wins	Poles	F/Laps	Podiums	Points	Position
2008	Formula Renault 2.0 WEC	Epsilon Euskadi	15	0	0	1	0	30	9th
2008	Formula Renault 2.0 Eurocup	Epsilon Euskadi	14	0	0	0	0	2	28th
2008	Porsche Carrera Cup Great Britain	Team Parker Racing	6	0	0	1	0	0	N/A†
2008	Rolex Sports Car Series – GT	Alegra Motorsports	1	0	0	0	0	1	106th
2009	Formula 3 Euro Series	Carlin Motorsport	20	0	0	0	1	6	18th
2009	British Formula 3	Carlin Motorsport	2	0	0	0	0	0	N/A
2009	Masters of Formula 3	Carlin Motorsport	1	0	0	0	0	N/A	29th
2009	Macau Grand Prix	Fortec Motorsport	1	0	0	0	0	N/A	NC
2009	Porsche Carrera Cup Great Britain	Team Parker Racing	6	0	0	0	0	0	N/A†
2009–10	GP2 Asia Series	Super Nova Racing	4	0	0	0	0	0	30th
2010	Formula Renault 3.5 Series	Carlin	17	0	1	0	0	13	19th
2010	Auto GP	Super Nova Racing	2	0	0	0	0	5	17th
2011	Formula Renault 3.5 Series	Mofaz Racing	17	0	0	1	0	33	15th
2011	GP2 Final	Barwa Addax Team	2	0	0	0	0	0	19th
2012	Formula Renault 3.5 Series	ISR	17	0	0	0	0	8	21st
2012	GP2 Series	Barwa Addax Team	4	0	0	0	0	0	32nd
2013	GP2 Series	Barwa Addax Team	24	0	0	0	0	0	28th

† – As Rosenzweig was a guest driver, he was ineligible for points.

=== Complete Eurocup Formula Renault 2.0 results ===
(key) (Races in bold indicate pole position; races in italics indicate fastest lap)

Year	Entrant	1	2	3	4	5	6	7	8	9	10	11	12	13	14	DC	Points
2008	Epsilon Euskadi	SPA; 1; 18	SPA; 2 Ret	SIL; 1; 37	SIL; 2; 28	HUN; 1; 20	HUN; 2; 16	NÜR; 1; 13	NÜR; 2; 18	LMS; 1; 10	LMS; 2; 18	EST; 1; 22	EST; 2; 29†	CAT; 1; 24	CAT; 2; 10	28th	2

=== Complete Formula 3 Euro Series results ===
(key) (Races in bold indicate pole position; races in italics indicate fastest lap)

Year	Entrant	Chassis	Engine	1	2	3	4	5	6	7	8	9	10	11	12	13	14	15	16	17	18	19	20	DC	Points
2009	Carlin Motorsport	Dallara F308/055	Volkswagen	HOC; 1 Ret	HOC; 2 Ret	LAU; 1; 21	LAU; 2; 15	NOR; 1; 15	NOR; 2; 18†	ZAN; 1; 7	ZAN; 2; 3	OSC; 1; 16	OSC; 2; 11	NÜR; 1; 15	NÜR; 2; 12	BRH; 1; 10	BRH; 2; 16	CAT; 1 NC	CAT; 2; 19	DIJ; 1 Ret	DIJ; 2 Ret	HOC; 1 Ret	HOC; 2; 15†	18th	6

† Driver did not finish the race, but was classified as he completed over 90% of the race distance.

=== Complete Formula Renault 3.5 Series results ===
(key) (Races in bold indicate pole position) (Races in italics indicate fastest lap)

Year	Team	1	2	3	4	5	6	7	8	9	10	11	12	13	14	15	16	17	Pos	Points
2010	Carlin	ALC; 1; 7	ALC; 2; 12	SPA; 1; 14	**SPA**; **2**; 8	MON; 1; 13	BRN; 1; 16	BRN; 2; 16	MAG; 1; 13	MAG; 2; 13	HUN; 1; 8	HUN; 2; 8	HOC; 1 Ret	HOC; 2 DNS	SIL; 1; 14	SIL; 2; 20	CAT; 1; 12	CAT; 2; 11	19th	13
2011	Mofaz Racing	ALC; 1; 13	ALC; 2; 12	SPA; 1; 20	SPA; 2 Ret	MNZ; 1; 11	MNZ; 2; 16	MON; 1; 18	NÜR; 1; 10	NÜR; 2 Ret	HUN; 1 Ret	HUN; 2; 15	SIL; 1; 11	SIL; 2; 6	LEC; 1; 4	LEC; 2; 4	CAT; 1; 19	CAT; 2 Ret	15th	33
2012	ISR	ALC; 1 Ret	ALC; 2 Ret	MON; 1 Ret	SPA; 1; 6	SPA; 2; 18	NÜR; 1; 11	NÜR; 2; 17†	MSC; 1 Ret	MSC; 2; 12	SIL; 1 Ret	SIL; 2; 13	HUN; 1; 16	HUN; 2; 22	LEC; 1; 20	LEC; 2; 20	CAT; 1; 17	CAT; 2; 11	21st	8

^{†} Driver did not finish the race, but was classified as he completed more than 90% of the race distance.

=== Complete GP2 Series results ===
(key) (Races in bold indicate pole position) (Races in italics indicate fastest lap)

Year	Entrant	1	2	3	4	5	6	7	8	9	10	11	12	13	14	15	16	17	18	19	20	21	22	23	24	DC	Points
2012	Barwa Addax Team	SEP; FEA	SEP; SPR	BHR1; FEA	BHR1; SPR	BHR2; FEA	BHR2; SPR	CAT; FEA	CAT; SPR	MON; FEA	MON; SPR	VAL; FEA	VAL; SPR	SIL; FEA	SIL; SPR	HOC; FEA	HOC; SPR	HUN; FEA	HUN; SPR	SPA; FEA	SPA; SPR	MNZ; FEA; 18	MNZ; SPR; 19	MRN; FEA; 15	MRN; SPR; 17	32nd	0
2013	Barwa Addax Team	SEP; FEA; 18	SEP; SPR; 20	BHR; FEA; 16	BHR; SPR; 19	CAT; FEA; 14	CAT; SPR; 22	MON; FEA; 14	MON; SPR; 10	SIL; FEA; 14	SIL; SPR; 21	NÜR; FEA; 23	NÜR; SPR; 20	HUN; FEA; 25†	HUN; SPR; 15	SPA; FEA; 17	SPA; SPR; 21	MNZ; FEA; Ret	MNZ; SPR; 18	MRN; FEA; 15	MRN; SPR; 18	YMC; FEA; 21†	YMC; SPR; 11			28th	0

^{†} Driver did not finish the race, but was classified as he completed more than 90% of the race distance.

==== Complete GP2 Asia Series results ====
(key) (Races in bold indicate pole position) (Races in italics indicate fastest lap)

Year	Entrant	1	2	3	4	5	6	7	8	DC	Points
2009–10	Super Nova Racing	YMC1; FEA	YMC1; SPR	YMC2; FEA	YMC2; SPR	BHR1; FEA; 19	BHR1; SPR; 14	BHR2; FEA; 17	BHR2; SPR; 17	30th	0

==== Complete GP2 Final results ====
(key) (Races in bold indicate pole position) (Races in italics indicate fastest lap)

Year	Entrant	1	2	DC	Points
2011	Barwa Addax Team	YMC; FEA; Ret	YMC; SPR; 14	19th	0
