= 2007 Euroseries 3000 =

Seasons
- ← 2006 2008 →

The 2007 Euroseries 3000 season was the ninth Euro Formula 3000 season. The series was won by Italian Davide Rigon who would go on to win the 2008 Superleague Formula season and compete in GP2.

Eight races counted simultaneously towards what was called the Italian Formula 3000 Championship, also won by Davide Rigon.

All teams used the Lola B02/50-Zytek chassis/engine combination.

== Teams and drivers ==
Team	No.	Driver	Rounds
(Italy) FMS International	1	(Brazil) Luiz Razia	1-4
(Italy) Minardi by GP Racing	3	(Brazil) Diego Nunes	All
(Italy) Minardi by GP Racing	4	(Italy) Davide Rigon	All
(Spain) G-Tec	5	(Venezuela) Pastor Maldonado	2
(Spain) G-Tec	5	(Italy) Giandomenico Sposito	3-4
(Spain) G-Tec	5	(Spain) Celso Míguez	5
(Spain) G-Tec	5	(Denmark) Kasper Andersen	6-8
(Spain) G-Tec	6	(Turkey) Jason Tahincioglu	2-3
(Spain) G-Tec	6	(Indonesia) Ananda Mikola	4
(Spain) G-Tec	6	(Ecuador) Sebastián Merchán	5
(Spain) G-Tec	6	(Italy) Giacomo Ricci	6
(Spain) G-Tec	6	(Sweden) Martin Kudzak	7
(Italy) Durango	7	(Colombia) Omar Leal	All
(Italy) RC Motorsport	10	(Italy) Oliver Martini	All
(Italy) Auto Sport Racing	11	(Bulgaria) Vladimir Arabadzhiev	All
(Italy) Auto Sport Racing	12	(Italy) Francesco Dracone	1
(Italy) Auto Sport Racing	12	(South Africa) Jimmy Auby	6-8
(Italy) ELK Motorsport	14	(Sweden) Alx Danielsson	1-4
(Italy) ELK Motorsport	14	(Brazil) Luiz Razia	5-8
(Italy) ELK Motorsport	15	(Ecuador) Sebastián Merchán	1-4
(Italy) ELK Motorsport	15	(Spain) Manuel Sáez Merino, Jr.	5
(Italy) ELK Motorsport	15	(Spain) Emilio de Villota Jr.	6
(Italy) ELK Motorsport	15	(Italy) Giacomo Ricci	7-8
(Italy) ELK Motorsport	16	(Morocco) Mehdi Bennani	1-5, 8
(Italy) ELK Motorsport	16	(Brazil) Tuka Rocha	6
(Italy) ELK Motorsport	16	(Venezuela) Johnny Cecotto Jr.	7
(Italy) 2G Racing	18	(Italy) Francesco Dracone	3-8
(Italy) 2G Racing	19	(Italy) Giuseppe Chiminelli	8
(Italy) Paragon Racing	21	(Italy) Davide Amaduzzi	1-2
(Italy) Paragon Racing	22	(Italy) Andrea Fausti	1-2, 4
(Italy) Racing Box	21	(Italy) Niki Sebastiani	3
(Italy) Racing Box	22	(Italy) Valentino Sebastiani	3

== Race calendar ==
Rounds denoted with a blue background are a part of the Italian Formula 3000 Championship.

Round		Circuit	Date	Pole Position	Fastest Lap	Winning Driver	Winning Team
1	R1	(Italy) ACI Vallelunga Circuit	22 April	(Italy) Davide Rigon	(Italy) Oliver Martini	(Italy) Oliver Martini	(Italy) RC Motorsport
1	R2	(Italy) ACI Vallelunga Circuit	22 April		(Sweden) Alx Danielsson	(Sweden) Alx Danielsson	(Italy) ELK Motorsport
2	R1	(Hungary) Hungaroring	17 June	(Venezuela) Pastor Maldonado	(Venezuela) Pastor Maldonado	(Venezuela) Pastor Maldonado	(Spain) G-Tec
2	R2	(Hungary) Hungaroring	17 June		(Sweden) Alx Danielsson	(Italy) Oliver Martini	(Italy) RC Motorsport
3	R1	(France) Circuit de Nevers Magny-Cours	15 July	(Sweden) Alx Danielsson	(Italy) Davide Rigon	(Italy) Davide Rigon	(Italy) Minardi by GP Racing
3	R2	(France) Circuit de Nevers Magny-Cours	15 July		(Sweden) Alx Danielsson	(Brazil) Diego Nunes	(Italy) Minardi by GP Racing
4	R1	(Italy) Mugello Circuit	22 July	(Italy) Davide Rigon	(Brazil) Diego Nunes	(Italy) Davide Rigon	(Italy) Minardi by GP Racing
4	R2	(Italy) Mugello Circuit	22 July		(Sweden) Alx Danielsson	(Brazil) Diego Nunes	(Italy) Minardi by GP Racing
5	R1	(Germany) Nürburgring	26 August	(Brazil) Luiz Razia	(Italy) Davide Rigon	(Italy) Davide Rigon	(Italy) Minardi by GP Racing
5	R2	(Germany) Nürburgring	26 August		(Brazil) Luiz Razia	(Spain) Manuel Sáez Merino, Jr.	(Italy) ELK Motorsport
6	R1	(Belgium) Circuit de Spa-Francorchamps	14 October	(Italy) Davide Rigon	(Italy) Davide Rigon	(Italy) Giacomo Ricci	(Spain) G-Tec
6	R2	(Belgium) Circuit de Spa-Francorchamps	14 October		(Italy) Davide Rigon	(Brazil) Diego Nunes	(Italy) Minardi by GP Racing
7	R1	(Italy) Autodromo Nazionale Monza	21 October	(Brazil) Diego Nunes	(Italy) Davide Rigon	(Italy) Davide Rigon	(Italy) Minardi by GP Racing
7	R2	(Italy) Autodromo Nazionale Monza	21 October		(Italy) Davide Rigon	(Italy) Davide Rigon	(Italy) Minardi by GP Racing
8	R1	(Spain) Circuit de Catalunya	11 November	(Italy) Davide Rigon	(Italy) Giacomo Ricci	(Brazil) Diego Nunes	(Italy) Minardi by GP Racing
8	R2	(Spain) Circuit de Catalunya	11 November		(Italy) Giacomo Ricci	(Italy) Giacomo Ricci	(Italy) ELK Motorsport

== Championship Standings ==
- Points for both championships are awarded as follows:

Race
Position	1st	2nd	3rd	4th	5th	6th	7th	8th
**Race One**	10	8	6	5	4	3	2	1
**Race Two**	6	5	4	3	2	1		

In addition:

- One point will be awarded for Pole position for Race One
- One point will be awarded for fastest lap in each race

=== Drivers ===
Pos	Driver	VLL (Italy)		HUN (Hungary)		MAG (France)		MUG (Italy)		NÜR (Germany)		SPA (Belgium)		MNZ (Italy)		CAT (Spain)		Points
1	(Italy) Davide Rigon	**2**	2	3	3	1	4	**1**	2	1	2	**2**	8	1	1	**2**	Ret	108
2	(Brazil) Diego Nunes	3	5	2	5	2	1	3	1	3	6	6	1	**Ret**	Ret	1	2	77
3	(Brazil) Luiz Razia	4	8	5	2	4	2	6	4	**2**	9	4	7	3	Ret	6	4	57
4	(Italy) Oliver Martini	1	3	7	1	Ret	6	Ret	9	5	Ret	5	9	Ret	Ret	4	5	39
5	(Italy) Giacomo Ricci											1	Ret	2	2	3	1	37
6	(Sweden) Alx Danielsson	6	1	4	6	**Ret**	3	2	Ret									32
7	(Bulgaria) Vladimir Arabadzhiev	5	4	Ret	7	6	Ret	4	7	9	5	11	5	6	6	9	Ret	23
8	(Ecuador) Sebastián Merchán	8	6	6	4	5	8	7	5	Ret	8							16
9	(Denmark) Kasper Andersen											3	Ret	Ret	Ret	5	3	14
10	(Colombia) Omar Leal	10	10	10	9	8	10	11	6	Ret	7	7	Ret	5	4	7	6	14
11	(Venezuela) Pastor Maldonado			**1**	Ret													12
12	(Spain) Manuel Sáez Merino, Jr.									4	1							11
13	(Turkey) Jason Tahincioglu			8	8	3	5											9
14	(Morocco) Mehdi Bennani	7	7	9	10	11	7	8	Ret	6	4							9
15	(Indonesia) Ananda Mikola							5	3									8
16	(South Africa) Jimmy Auby											9	3	Ret	5	8	Ret	7
17	(Brazil) Tuka Rocha											8	2					6
18	(Spain) Celso Míguez									7	3							6
19	(Sweden) Martin Kudzak													4	Ret			5
20	(Venezuela) Johnny Cecotto Jr.													Ret	3			4
21	(Spain) Emilio de Villota Jr.											10	4					3
22	(Italy) Francesco Dracone	9	9			10	9	10	Ret	8	Ret	12	6	Ret	7	10	7	2
23	(Italy) Giandomenico Sposito					7	Ret	9	Ret									2
24	(Italy) Andrea Fausti	12	11	DNS	DNS			12	8									0
25	(Italy) Valentino Sebastiani					9	Ret											0
26	(Italy) Davide Amaduzzi	11	12	Ret	DNS													0
27	(Italy) Niki Sebastiani					12	11											0
28	(Italy) Giuseppe Chiminelli															Ret	Ret	0
Pos	Driver	VLL (Italy)		HUN (Hungary)		MAG (France)		MUG (Italy)		NÜR (Germany)		SPA (Belgium)		MNZ (Italy)		CAT (Spain)		Points

Colour	Result
Gold	Winner
Silver	Second place
Bronze	Third place
Green	Points classification
Blue	Non-points classification
Blue	Non-classified finish (NC)
Purple	Retired, not classified (Ret)
Red	Did not qualify (DNQ)
Red	Did not pre-qualify (DNPQ)
Black	Disqualified (DSQ)
White	Did not start (DNS)
White	Withdrew (WD)
White	Race cancelled (C)
Blank	Did not practice (DNP)
Blank	Did not arrive (DNA)
Blank	Excluded (EX)

**Bold** - Pole
Italics - Fastest Lap

==== F3000 Italian Championship ====
Pos	Driver	VLL (Italy)		HUN (Hungary)		MUG (Italy)		MNZ (Italy)		Points
1	(Italy) Davide Rigon	**2**	2	3	3	**1**	2	1	1	58
2	(Brazil) Diego Nunes	3	5	2	5	3	1	**Ret**	Ret	32
3	(Sweden) Alx Danielsson	6	1	4	6	2	Ret			26
4	(Brazil) Luiz Razia	4	8	5	2	6	4	3	Ret	26
5	(Italy) Oliver Martini	1	3	7	1	Ret	9	Ret	Ret	23
6	(Bulgaria) Vladimir Arabadzhiev	5	4	Ret	7	4	7	6	6	16
7	(Italy) Giacomo Ricci							2	2	13
8	(Venezuela) Pastor Maldonado			**1**	Ret					12
9	(Ecuador) Sebastián Merchán	8	6	6	4	7	5			12
10	(Indonesia) Ananda Mikola					5	3			8
11	(Colombia) Omar Leal	10	10	10	9	11	6	5	4	8
12	(Sweden) Martin Kudzak							4	Ret	5
13	(Venezuela) Johnny Cecotto Jr.							Ret	3	4
14	(Morocco) Mehdi Bennani	7	7	9	10	8	Ret			3
15	(South Africa) Jimmy Auby							Ret	5	2
16	(Turkey) Jason Tahincioglu			8	8					1
17	(Italy) Francesco Dracone	9	9			10	Ret	Ret	7	0
18	(Italy) Andrea Fausti	12	11	DNS	DNS	12	8			0
19	(Italy) Giandomenico Sposito					9	Ret			0
20	(Italy) Davide Amaduzzi	11	12	Ret	DNS					0
21	(Denmark) Kasper Andersen							Ret	Ret	0
Pos	Driver	VLL (Italy)		HUN (Hungary)		MUG (Italy)		MNZ (Italy)		Points

Colour	Result
Gold	Winner
Silver	Second place
Bronze	Third place
Green	Points classification
Blue	Non-points classification
Blue	Non-classified finish (NC)
Purple	Retired, not classified (Ret)
Red	Did not qualify (DNQ)
Red	Did not pre-qualify (DNPQ)
Black	Disqualified (DSQ)
White	Did not start (DNS)
White	Withdrew (WD)
White	Race cancelled (C)
Blank	Did not practice (DNP)
Blank	Did not arrive (DNA)
Blank	Excluded (EX)

**Bold** - Pole
Italics - Fastest Lap

=== Teams ===
Pos	Team	VLL (Italy)		HUN (Hungary)		MAG (France)		MUG (Italy)		NÜR (Germany)		SPA (Belgium)		MNZ (Italy)		CAT (Spain)		Points
1	(Italy) Minardi by GP Racing	3	5	2	5	2	1	3	1	3	6	6	1	Ret	Ret	1	2	185
1	(Italy) Minardi by GP Racing	2	2	3	3	1	4	1	2	1	2	2	8	1	1	2	Ret	185
2	(Italy) ELK Motorsport	6	1	4	6	Ret	3	2	Ret	2	9	4	7	3	Ret	6	4	135
2	(Italy) ELK Motorsport	8	6	6	4	5	8	7	5	4	1	10	4	2	2	3	1	135
3	(Spain) G-Tec			1	Ret	7	Ret	9	Ret	7	3	3	Ret	Ret	Ret	5	3	66
3	(Spain) G-Tec			8	8	3	5	5	3	Ret	8	1	Ret	4	Ret			66
4	(Italy) RC Motorsport	1	3	7	1	Ret	6	Ret	9	5	Ret	5	9	Ret	Ret	4	5	39
5	(Italy) FMS International	4	8	5	2	4	2	6	4									30
6	(Italy) Auto Sport Racing	5	4	Ret	7	6	Ret	4	7	9	5	11	5	6	6	9	Ret	30
6	(Italy) Auto Sport Racing	9	9									9	3	Ret	5	8	Ret	30
7	(Italy) Durango	10	10	10	9	8	10	11	6	Ret	7	7	Ret	5	4	7	6	14
8	(Italy) 2G Racing					10	9	10	Ret	8	Ret	12	6	Ret	7	10	7	2
8	(Italy) 2G Racing															Ret	Ret	2
9	(Italy) Paragon Racing	11	12	Ret	DNS													0
9	(Italy) Paragon Racing	12	11	DNS	DNS			12	8									0
10	(Italy) Racing Box					12	11											0
10	(Italy) Racing Box					9	Ret											0
Pos	Team	VLL (Italy)		HUN (Hungary)		MAG (France)		MUG (Italy)		NÜR (Germany)		SPA (Belgium)		MNZ (Italy)		CAT (Spain)		Points

Colour	Result
Gold	Winner
Silver	Second place
Bronze	Third place
Green	Points classification
Blue	Non-points classification
Blue	Non-classified finish (NC)
Purple	Retired, not classified (Ret)
Red	Did not qualify (DNQ)
Red	Did not pre-qualify (DNPQ)
Black	Disqualified (DSQ)
White	Did not start (DNS)
White	Withdrew (WD)
White	Race cancelled (C)
Blank	Did not practice (DNP)
Blank	Did not arrive (DNA)
Blank	Excluded (EX)

**Bold** - Pole
Italics - Fastest Lap

==== F3000 Italian Championship ====
Pos	Team	VLL (Italy)		HUN (Hungary)		MUG (Italy)		MNZ (Italy)		Points
1	(Italy) Minardi by GP Racing	3	5	2	5	3	1	Ret	Ret	90
1	(Italy) Minardi by GP Racing	2	2	3	3	1	2	1	1	90
2	(Italy) ELK Motorsport	6	1	4	6	2	Ret	3	Ret	62
2	(Italy) ELK Motorsport	8	6	6	4	7	5	2	2	62
3	(Spain) G-Tec			1	Ret	9	Ret	Ret	Ret	26
3	(Spain) G-Tec			8	8	5	3	4	Ret	26
4	(Italy) RC Motorsport	1	3	7	1	Ret	9	Ret	Ret	23
5	(Italy) FMS International	4	8	5	2	6	4			20
6	(Italy) Auto Sport Racing	5	4	Ret	7	4	7	6	6	18
6	(Italy) Auto Sport Racing	9	9					Ret	5	18
7	(Italy) Durango	10	10	10	9	11	6	5	4	8
8	(Italy) 2G Racing					10	Ret	Ret	7	0
9	(Italy) Paragon Racing	11	12	Ret	DNS					0
9	(Italy) Paragon Racing	12	11	DNS	DNS	12	8			0
Pos	Team	VLL (Italy)		HUN (Hungary)		MUG (Italy)		MNZ (Italy)		Points

Colour	Result
Gold	Winner
Silver	Second place
Bronze	Third place
Green	Points classification
Blue	Non-points classification
Blue	Non-classified finish (NC)
Purple	Retired, not classified (Ret)
Red	Did not qualify (DNQ)
Red	Did not pre-qualify (DNPQ)
Black	Disqualified (DSQ)
White	Did not start (DNS)
White	Withdrew (WD)
White	Race cancelled (C)
Blank	Did not practice (DNP)
Blank	Did not arrive (DNA)
Blank	Excluded (EX)

**Bold** - Pole
Italics - Fastest Lap
