= Vladimir Arabadzhiev =

Bulgarian racing driver

- Nationality: (Bulgaria) Bulgarian
- Born: 16 March 1984 (age 42) Plovdiv, People's Republic of Bulgaria

GP2 Series career
- Debut season: 2010
- Current team: Scuderia Coloni
- Car number: 21
- Starts: 16
- Wins: 0
- Poles: 0
- Fastest laps: 0
- Best finish: 29th in 2010

Previous series
- 2006 2007 2008–09 2009–10: Italian Formula Three; Euroseries 3000; International Formula Master; GP2 Asia Series

Vladimir "Vlado" Vulchev Arabadzhiev (Bulgarian: Владимир "Владо" Вълчев Арабаджиев, born 16 March 1984) is a Bulgarian former racing driver.

== Career ==
=== Formula Three ===
Arabadzhiev began his career in the Italian Formula Three Championship in 2006, finishing the season in 11th in the standings, scoring five points.

=== Formula 3000 ===
Arabadzhiev moved onto the Euroseries 3000 championship in 2007, where he finished seventh in the standings, scoring 23 points.

=== Formula Master ===
Arabadzhiev joined the International Formula Master series in 2008, finishing seventh in the standings for JD Motorsport, taking one win. He remained in the series with JD in 2009, where he finished seventh once again. He was awarded a test for World Touring Car Championship team Chevrolet at the Pembrey Circuit in Wales.

=== GP2 Series ===
Arabadzhiev raced in the 2009–10 season of the GP2 Asia Series, for the Rapax Team, which took over Piquet GP after the first round. He also took part in the main series for the 2010 season, moving to Scuderia Coloni to partner Alberto Valerio. After sixteen races without scoring a point, he was replaced by Brendon Hartley.

== Racing career ==
=== Career summary ===
Season	Series	Team	Races	Wins	Poles	F/Laps	Podiums	Points	Position
2006	Italian Formula Three Championship	En.Ro. Competition	14	0	0	0	0	5	11th
2007	Euroseries 3000	Auto Sport Racing	16	0	0	0	0	23	7th
2007	F3000 Italian Championship	Auto Sport Racing	8	0	0	0	0	16	6th
2008	International Formula Master	JD Motorsport	16	1	0	1	3	29	7th
2009	International Formula Master	JD Motorsport	16	0	0	0	5	37	7th
2009–10	GP2 Asia Series	Piquet GP	2	0	0	0	0	0	20th
2009–10	GP2 Asia Series	Rapax	6	0	0	0	0	0	20th
2010	Auto GP Series	DAMS	2	1	0	0	1	8	11th
2010	GP2 Series	Scuderia Coloni	16	0	0	0	0	0	29th

=== Complete GP2 Series results ===
(key) (Races in bold indicate pole position) (Races in italics indicate fastest lap)

Year	Entrant	1	2	3	4	5	6	7	8	9	10	11	12	13	14	15	16	17	18	19	20	DC	Points
2010	Scuderia Coloni	CAT; FEA; 19	CAT; SPR; 20	MON; FEA; Ret	MON; SPR; 13	IST; FEA; Ret	IST; SPR; Ret	VAL; FEA; 13	VAL; SPR; 9	SIL; FEA; 21	SIL; SPR; 17	HOC; FEA; 15	HOC; SPR; 15	HUN; FEA; 18	HUN; SPR; 14	SPA; FEA; 19	SPA; SPR; Ret	MNZ; FEA	MNZ; SPR	YMC; FEA	YMC; SPR	29th	0

==== Complete GP2 Asia Series results ====
(key) (Races in bold indicate pole position) (Races in italics indicate fastest lap)

Year	Entrant	1	2	3	4	5	6	7	8	DC	Points
2009–10	Piquet GP	YMC1; FEA; Ret	YMC1; SPR; Ret							20th	0
2009–10	Rapax Team			YMC2; FEA; 13	YMC2; SPR; 10	BHR1; FEA; 17	BHR1; SPR; 7	BHR2; FEA; 12	BHR2; SPR; 9	20th	0
