= Giacomo Ricci =

Italian racing driver (born 1985)

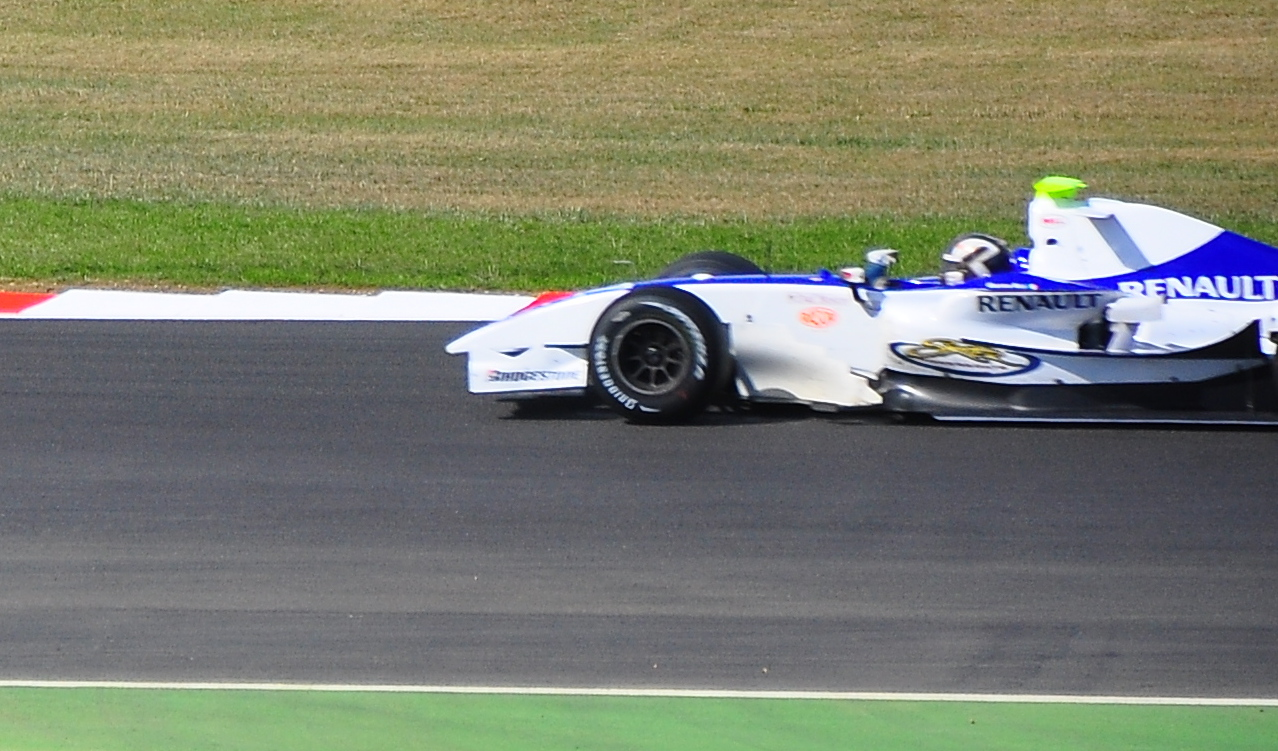
- Ricci racing for DPR in 2010
- Nationality: (Italy) Italian
- Born: 30 March 1985 (age 41) Baveno, Italy
- Categorisation: FIA Gold

Previous series
- 2010, 12-13 2008–2010 2009–10 2009 2008–09 2008–09 2008 2008 2007 2004–07 2004 2003 2003 2002 2002 2001–02 2001: Auto GP; GP2 Series; GP2 Asia Series; Le Mans Series; GP2 Asia Series; International GT Open; Italian Formula Three; International Formula Master; Champ Car Atlantic; Euro/Italian Formula 3000; World Series by Nissan; Fran-Am; Formula Junior 1600 Spain; FR2000 Germany; FR2000 Eurocup; Formula BMW ADAC; Italian Formula Renault 2000

Championship titles
- 2006 2006: Euroseries 3000; Italian Formula 3000

Giacomo Ricci (born 30 March 1985 in Baveno) is a former Italian racing driver.

== Career ==
=== Formula BMW ===
Ricci began his car racing career by driving in the German-based Formula BMW ADAC series in 2001 and 2002, with a best finish of seventh in the drivers' championship.

=== Formula Renault ===
Ricci also competed in one race of the Italian Formula Renault Championship in 2001, and competed in rounds of the two-litre German series and the European Cup in 2002. For 2003, he made a step down to the smaller engine category of the Spanish Formula Junior 1600 series, finishing fourth in the championship. He also drove in one race of the North American-based FRenault series during the year. In 2004, he drove in eight races of the World Series by Nissan (who share the same owners as Renault, the championship being rebranded as the World Series by Renault the following year).

=== Formula 3000 ===
From 2004 to 2007, Ricci drove in the F3000 series variously known as Euro Formula 3000, Italian Formula 3000 and the Euroseries 3000. After initially scoring no points from four races in 2004, he improved to third place in the standings in 2005. In 2006, driving for the Fisichella Motorsport team, he won the championship with five wins and thirteen podium finishes. For 2007, he only competed in selected rounds and finished fifth in the championship, opting to focus his intentions on North American-based motor racing that year.

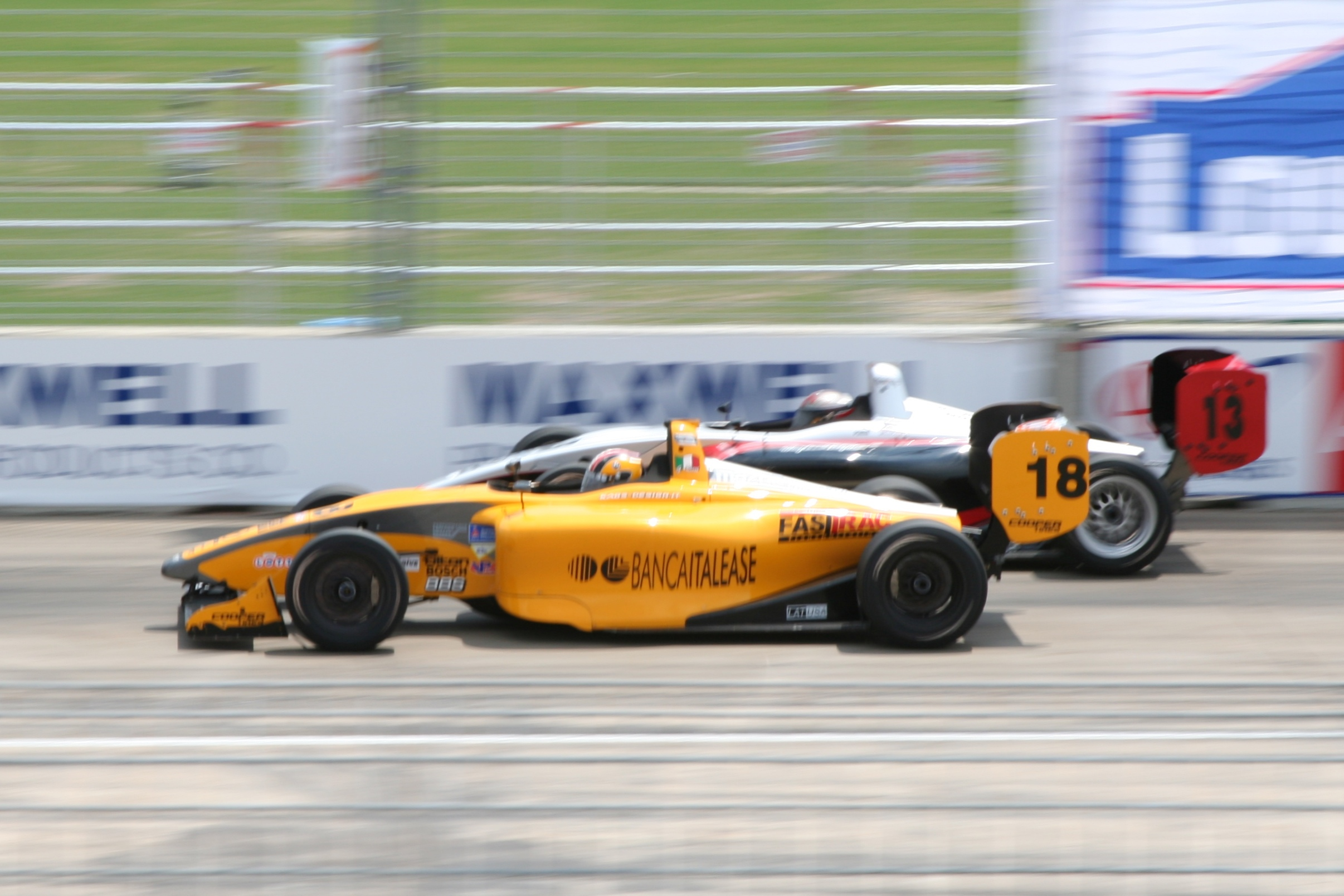
Ricci (foreground) racing in the 2007 Champ Car Atlantic Houston race

=== Champ Car Atlantic ===
Ricci duly drove in Champ Car Atlantic (the feeder series for the now-defunct Champ Car World Series) in 2007 for the Conquest Racing team. He finished in sixth place in the championship, despite not scoring any wins or podium finishes. He was the third-highest ranked rookie of 2007, behind Franck Perera and Robert Wickens.

=== GP2 Series ===
Ricci received his GP2 Series call-up in 2008 to replace the injured Michael Herck in the David Price Racing team for the first few rounds of the championship, because the Belgian-Romanian driver had broken his wrist in the preceding GP2 Asia Series. His team-mate was Brazilian Diego Nunes. He was replaced by Andy Soucek after the first two rounds of the championship as Herck continued to recover.

Ricci then competed in the first round of the 2008–09 GP2 Asia Series season for the Trident Racing team. He was then replaced by Alberto Valerio, so he moved back to DPR for the second round onwards, where he in turn replaced Yuhi Sekiguchi.

Ricci continued with DPR into the 2009 GP2 Series season, teaming up with Herck this time, as he did in the Asia Series. Ricci struggled with reliability, finishing only three of the seven races he started and was replaced for the Nürburgring rounds by ex-IndyCar Series racer Franck Perera.

Ricci returned for the 2009–10 GP2 Asia Series season and after a double retirement at the first Abu Dhabi round, Ricci scored his first ever GP2 points in either the main series or the Asia Series, after finishing fifth in the second Abu Dhabi feature race. He added his first podium the following day, finishing third behind team-mate Herck and race-winner Davide Valsecchi during the sprint race. His first victory came in the final race of the season, leading from lights-to-flag in Bahrain. With this result, he sealed third place in the championship both for himself, and his team.

Ricci remained with DPR for the 2010 main series, and scored his first points finish with second place in the first race of the season. He then endured an eleven-race, non-scoring streak, but a stronger weekend in Hungary culminated in his maiden main series win in the sprint race. However, he was replaced by compatriot Fabrizio Crestani thereafter. He still finished in thirteenth place in the drivers' championship despite missing the final six races on the calendar.

After spending most of 2011 without a drive, Ricci returned to the GP2 Series for the non-championship races in Abu Dhabi that concluded the season. Driving for Super Nova Racing alongside compatriot Fabio Onidi, he finished 11th and 23rd in the two races.

=== International GT Open ===
Ricci also competed in the GTA and GTS classes of the International GT Open championship in 2008.

=== Auto GP ===
The withdrawal of the Super Nova team from the GP2 Series hampered Ricci's hopes to remain in the category, so for 2012, he returned to the Euroseries 3000 (now rebranded as the Auto GP) to compete in selected events for the Austrian Zele Racing team.

Ricci is currently the team manager of Trident Racing.

== Racing record ==
=== Career summary ===
Season	Series	Team	Races	Wins	Poles	F/Laps	Podiums	Points	Position
2001	Formula BMW ADAC	CTS-Motorsport	20	1	0	?	3	94	7th
2001	Formula Renault 2.0 Italia	Toby Fortec Racing	1	0	0	0	0	0	NC
2002	Formula Renault 2000 Germany	SL Formula Racing	8	0	0	0	0	26	28th
2002	Formula Renault 2000 Eurocup	KUG Motorsport	6	0	0	0	0	0	NC
2002	Formula BMW ADAC	KUG/Dewalt Racing	6	0	0	0	0	15	18th
2003	Formula Junior 1600 Spain	?	?	?	?	?	?	106	4th
2003	Fran-Am 2000 Winter World Championship	Team Italia	1	0	0	0	0	30	29th
2004	World Series by Nissan	Vergani Formula	6	0	0	0	0	4	19th
2004	World Series by Nissan	GD Racing	2	0	0	0	0	4	19th
2004	Euro Formula 3000 Series	Power Tech	4	0	0	0	0	0	14th
2005	Italian Formula 3000 Championship	Team Astromega	8	0	0	1	4	33	**3rd**
2006	Euroseries 3000	FMS International	18	5	1	7	13	106	**1st**
2007	Euroseries 3000	G-Tec	2	1	0	0	1	37	5th
2007	Euroseries 3000	ELK Motorsport	4	1	0	2	4	37	5th
2007	Champ Car Atlantic	Conquest Racing	12	0	0	0	0	188	6th
2008	GP2 Series	DPR	4	0	0	0	0	0	31st
2008	International GT Open - GTA	GPC Sport	6	0	0	0	2	19	12th
2008	International GT Open - GTS	Villois Racing	4	1	0	0	3	26	10th
2008	Italian Formula 3 Championship	BVM - Target Racing	2	0	0	0	0	5	16th
2008	International Formula Master	Euronova Racing	2	0	0	0	0	0	34th
2008–09	GP2 Asia Series	Trident Racing	2	0	0	0	0	0	27th
2008–09	GP2 Asia Series	DPR	9	0	0	0	0	0	27th
2009	GP2 Series	DPR	7	0	0	0	0	0	27th
2009	International GT Open - Super GT	Advanced Engineering	12	1	0	0	6	50	5th
2009	Le Mans Series - GT2	FBR	1	0	0	0	0	3	20th
2009–10	GP2 Asia Series	DPR	8	1	0	1	3	29	**3rd**
2010	GP2 Series	DPR	14	1	0	0	2	16	13th
2010	Auto GP Series	RP Motorsport	2	0	0	0	1	8	12th
2010	Superleague Formula	Galatasaray S.K.	3	0	0	0	0	358‡	13th‡
2011	GP2 Final	Super Nova Racing	2	0	0	0	0	0	15th
2012	Auto GP World Series	Zele Racing	4	0	0	0	1	40	11th
2012	Auto GP World Series	Team MLR71	2	0	0	0	0	40	11th
2013	Auto GP Series	Team MLR71	2	0	0	0	0	0	24th
2014	MW-V6 Pickup Series	Team Italy	3	0	0	3	3	51	7th

‡ Team standings.

=== Complete Euroseries 3000/Auto GP results ===
(key) (Races in bold indicate pole position) (Races in italics indicate fastest lap)

Year	Entrant	1	2	3	4	5	6	7	8	9	10	11	12	13	14	15	16	17	18	DC	Points
2004	Power Tech	BRN; 10	EST; 7	JER; Ret	MNZ; 8	SPA	DON	DIJ	ZOL	NÜR1	NÜR2									14th	0
2005	Team Astromega	ADR; Ret	VAL; 3	BRN; 2	IMO; 9	MUG; 3	MAG; 7	MNZ; 5	MIS; 3											**3rd**	**33**
2006	FMS International	ADR; 1; 5	ADR; 2; 1	IMO; 1; 1	IMO; 2; 1	SPA; 1; 2	SPA; 2; 1	HUN; 1; 2	HUN; 2; 4	MUG; 1; 3	MUG; 2; 3	SIL; 1; 3	SIL; 2; 11	CAT; 1; 2	CAT; 2 Ret	VAL; 1; 5	VAL; 2; 3	**MIS**; **1**; 1	MIS; 2; 2	**1st**	**106**
2007	ELK Motorsport	VAL; 1	VAL; 2	HUN; 1	HUN; 2	SIL; 1	SIL; 2	MUG; 1	MUG; 2	NÜR; 1	NÜR; 2	SPA; 1; 1	SPA; 2 Ret	**MNZ**; **1**; 2	MNZ; 2; 2	CAT; 1; 3	CAT; 2; 1			5th	37
2010	RP Motorsport	BRN; 1	BRN; 2	IMO; 1	IMO; 2	SPA; 1	SPA; 2	MAG; 1	MAG; 2	NAV; 1; 6	NAV; 2; 2	MNZ; 1	MNZ; 2							12th	8
2012	Zele Racing	MNZ; 1; 6	MNZ; 2; 14	VAL; 1	VAL; 2	MAR; 1; 5	MAR; 2; 3	HUN; 1	HUN; 2	ALG; 1	ALG; 2	CUR; 1	CUR; 2							11th	40
2012	Team MLR71													SON; 1; 5	SON; 2; 11†					11th	40
2013	Team MLR71	MNZ; 1 Ret	MNZ; 2; 12	MAR; 1	MAR; 2	HUN; 1	HUN; 2	SIL; 1	SIL; 2	MUG; 1	MUG; 2	NÜR; 1	NÜR; 2	DON; 1	DON; 2	BRN; 1	BRN; 2			24th	0

=== Complete GP2 Series results ===
(key) (Races in bold indicate pole position) (Races in italics indicate fastest lap)

Year	Entrant	1	2	3	4	5	6	7	8	9	10	11	12	13	14	15	16	17	18	19	20	DC	Points
2008	DPR	CAT; FEA; 16	CAT; SPR; Ret	IST; FEA; Ret	IST; SPR; 11	MON; FEA	MON; SPR	MAG; FEA	MAG; SPR	SIL; FEA	SIL; SPR	HOC; FEA	HOC; SPR	HUN; FEA	HUN; SPR	VAL; FEA	VAL; SPR	SPA; FEA	SPA; SPR	MNZ; FEA	MNZ; SPR	31st	0
2009	DPR	CAT; FEA; Ret	CAT; SPR; 15	MON; FEA; 14	MON; SPR; Ret	IST; FEA; Ret	IST; SPR; Ret	SIL; FEA; 17	SIL; SPR; DNS	NÜR; FEA	NÜR; SPR	HUN; FEA	HUN; SPR	VAL; FEA	VAL; SPR	SPA; FEA	SPA; SPR	MNZ; FEA	MNZ; SPR	ALG; FEA	ALG; SPR	27th	0
2010	DPR	CAT; FEA; 2	CAT; SPR; 8	MON; FEA; 17	MON; SPR; Ret	IST; FEA; Ret	IST; SPR; 17	VAL; FEA; Ret	VAL; SPR; Ret	SIL; FEA; 13	SIL; SPR; 12	HOC; FEA; 16†	HOC; SPR; 11	HUN; FEA; 8	HUN; SPR; 1	SPA; FEA	SPA; SPR	MNZ; FEA	MNZ; SPR	YMC; FEA	YMC; SPR	13th	16

==== Complete GP2 Asia Series results ====
(key) (Races in bold indicate pole position) (Races in italics indicate fastest lap)

Year	Entrant	1	2	3	4	5	6	7	8	9	10	11	12	DC	Points
2008–09	Trident Racing	SHI; FEA; 13	SHI; SPR; Ret											27th	0
2008–09	David Price Racing			DUB; FEA; 13	DUB; SPR; C	BHR1; FEA; Ret	BHR1; SPR; 16	LSL; FEA; Ret	LSL; SPR; 13	SEP; FEA; 16	SEP; SPR; 15	BHR2; FEA; 11	BHR2; SPR; 10	27th	0
2009–10	David Price Racing	YMC1; FEA; Ret	YMC1; SPR; Ret	YMC2; FEA; 5	YMC2; SPR; 3	BHR1; FEA; 4	BHR1; SPR; 2	BHR2; FEA; 5	BHR2; SPR; 1					**3rd**	**29**

==== Complete GP2 Final results ====
(key) (Races in bold indicate pole position) (Races in italics indicate fastest lap)

Year	Entrant	1	2	DC	Points
2011	Super Nova Racing	YMC; FEA; 11	YMC; SPR; 23	15th	0

Sporting positions
Preceded by Luca Filippi	Euroseries 3000 champion 2006	Succeeded by Davide Rigon
