= Edoardo Piscopo =

Italian racing driver

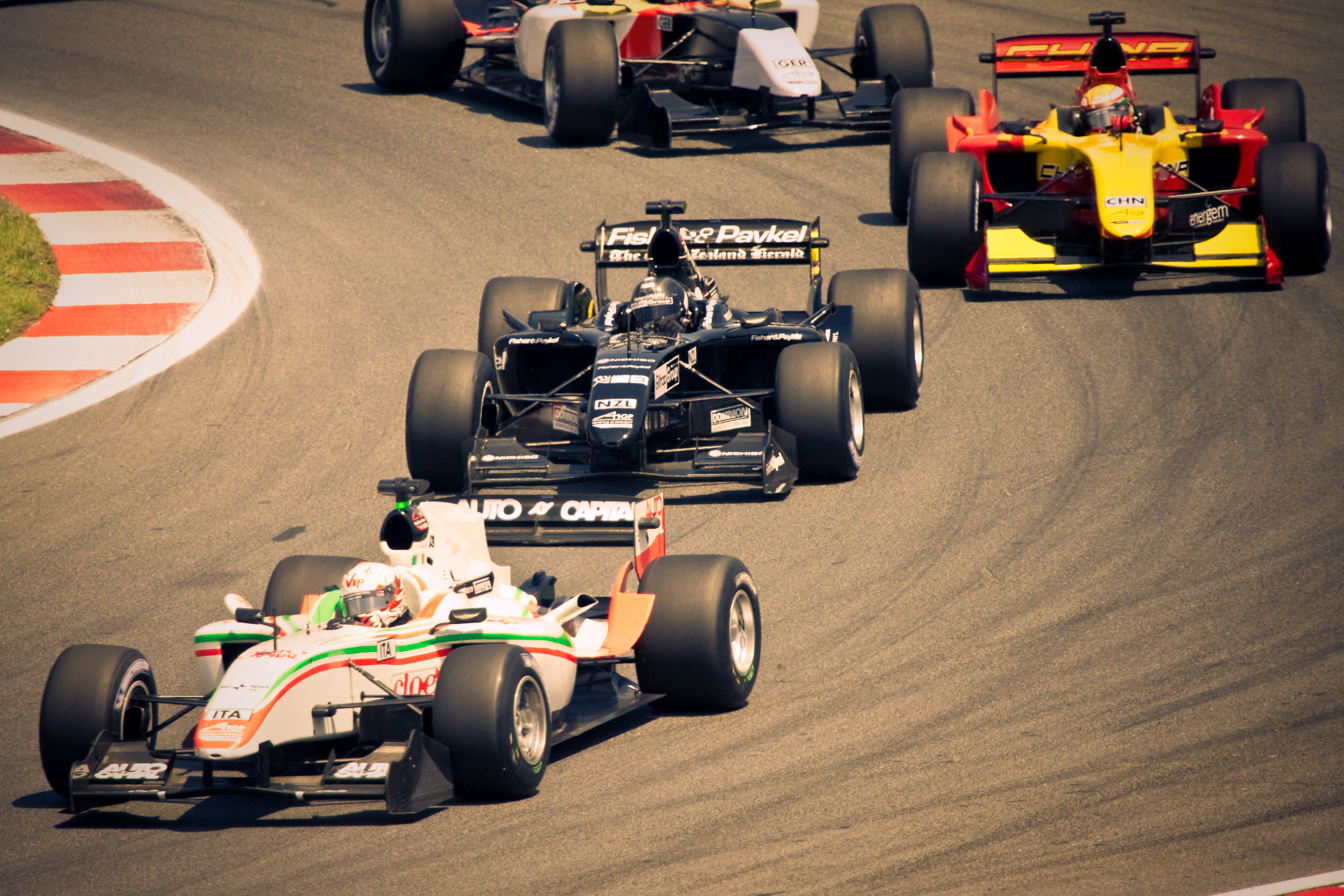
- Piscopo (leading) competing for A1 Team Italy at the 2008–09 A1 Grand Prix of Nations, South Africa.
- Nationality: (Italy) Italian
- Born: 4 February 1988 (age 38) Rome, Italy

Lamborghini Super Trofeo career
- Debut season: 2014
- Current team: Bonaldi Motorsport
- Categorisation: FIA Gold
- Car number: 3
- Starts: 14
- Wins: 5
- Poles: 1
- Fastest laps: 4
- Best finish: 1 in 2014

Previous series
- 2010 2009–10 2009 2008 2008 2008 2008 2007–08, 2008–09 2007 2007 2006 2006 2005: GP2 Series; GP2 Asia Series; FIA Formula Two; Italian Formula Three; Euroseries 3000; Spanish Formula Three; Formula One testing A1 Grand Prix; Formula Three Euroseries; Toyota Racing Series; Eurocup Formula Renault; Formula Renault 2.0 Italia; Formula BMW USA

Edoardo Piscopo (born 4 February 1988) is an Italian former racing driver.

== Career ==
=== Formula BMW ===
After previously competing in karting, Piscopo began his single seater career in Formula BMW USA in 2005, where despite missing the first rounds he finished fifth with three wins for EuroInternational. He also finished fifth in the Bahrain World Final.

=== Formula Renault ===
After winning in Formula BMW USA, Piscopo joined the RED BULL Junior Team and moved back to Europe in 2006 to compete in Formula Renault. In his debut season, he scored ten podiums finishing third in Formula Renault 2.0 Italia for Cram Competition, behind Dani Clos and teammate Adrian Zaugg. He also finished tenth in Eurocup Formula Renault 2.0 for the team.

=== Formula Three ===
Piscopo stepped up to Formula Three in 2007, competing in the Formula Three Euroseries for Mücke Motorsport. He only managed to score eight points in 20 races, finishing 15th in the standings. He did however finish fifth in the 2007 Masters of Formula 3 at Zolder.

Piscopo joined A1 Team Italy to drive in the A1 Grand Prix series for the 2007–08 season, sharing duties with Enrico Toccacelo.

Piscopo moved to the Italian Formula Three Championship in 2008, scoring seven wins on his way to second in the final standings, behind champion Mirko Bortolotti. They were both given the chance to test for Formula One team Scuderia Ferrari.

=== FIA Formula Two Championship ===
Piscopo became the last driver to sign up for the inaugural season of the FIA Formula Two Championship in 2009. He finished twelfth in the championship due to missing the final round to concentrate on his GP2 Asia campaign.

=== GP2 Series ===
Piscopo missed the final round of the Formula Two season as he joined DAMS for the 2009–10 GP2 Asia Series season.

Piscopo made his Main Series début for the Trident team at Monza in 2010. He replaced Johnny Cecotto Jr. He was replaced by Federico Leo at the next round of the championship.

=== Auto GP ===
Piscopo moved to the Auto GP series for 2010. He led the majority of the championship, but was ultimately overhauled by Romain Grosjean.

=== Blancpain Endurance Series ===
Piscopo was appointed by Lotus as factory driver for the Lotus GT4 campaign. Despite winning three rounds out of five, he finished second in the championship.

=== Porsche Carrera Cup Italia ===
Piscopo joined the highly competitive Porsche Carrera Cup. He won the best rookie title and finished third in the championship.

=== Lamborghini Super Trofeo ===
Piscopo has won the European, the American and the World Championship Super Trofeo title. In 2015, he became the Huracan GT3 factory test driver.

== Racing record ==
=== Career summary ===
Season	Series	Team	Races	Wins	Poles	F/Laps	Podiums	Points	Position
2005	Formula BMW USA	EuroInternational	12	3	1	2	5	108	5th
2006	Eurocup Formula Renault 2.0	Cram Competition	14	0	0	1	0	34	10th
2006	Formula Renault 2.0 Italy	Cram Competition	12	0	1	1	10	216	**3rd**
2006–07	Toyota Racing Series	Mark Petch Motorsport	5	0	0	?	1	78	25th
2007	Formula 3 Euro Series	ASL Mücke Motorsport	20	0	0	0	1	8	15th
2007	Masters of Formula 3	ASL Mücke Motorsport	1	0	0	0	0	N/A	5th
2007–08	A1 Grand Prix	A1 Team Italy	14	0	0	0	0	12	18th
2008	Italian Formula Three	Team Ghinzani	16	7	8	7	11	127	**2nd**
2008	Euroseries 3000	Sighinolfi Autoracing	2	0	0	0	2	10	14th
2008	Spanish Formula Three	GTA Motor Competición	2	0	0	0	0	0	NC
2008–09	A1 Grand Prix	A1 Team Italy	8	0	0	0	0	17	16th
2009	FIA Formula Two Championship	Motorsport Vision	14	0	0	0	0	19	12th
2009	Euroseries 3000	Emmebi Motorsport	3	0	0	0	1	11	9th
2009–10	GP2 Asia Series	DAMS	8	0	0	0	0	3	16th
2010	Auto GP	DAMS	12	0	0	1	5	42	**2nd**
2010	Formula Le Mans	DAMS	1	0	1	0	0	1	15th
2010	GP2 Series	Trident Racing	2	0	0	0	0	2	26th

=== Complete Eurocup Formula Renault 2.0 results ===
(key) (Races in bold indicate pole position; races in italics indicate fastest lap)

Year	Entrant	1	2	3	4	5	6	7	8	9	10	11	12	13	14	DC	Points
2006	Cram Competition	ZOL; 1 Ret	ZOL; 2; 18	IST; 1; 5	IST; 2; 6	MIS; 1; 5	MIS; 2; 11	NÜR; 1; 10	NÜR; 2; 11	DON; 1; 7	DON; 2; 16	LMS; 1 Ret	LMS; 2 Ret	CAT; 1; 13	CAT; 2; 4	10th	34

=== Complete FIA Formula Two Championship results ===
(key) (Races in bold indicate pole position) (Races in italics indicate fastest lap)

Year	1	2	3	4	5	6	7	8	9	10	11	12	13	14	15	16	DC	Points
2009	VAL; 1 Ret	VAL; 2; 7	BRN; 1; 7	BRN; 2; 4	SPA; 1; 8	SPA; 2; 14	BRH; 1; 8	BRH; 2; 7	DON; 1; 4	DON; 2 Ret	OSC; 1; 12	OSC; 2; 8	IMO; 1; 13	IMO; 2 Ret	CAT; 1	CAT; 2	12th	19

=== Complete GP2 Series results ===
(key) (Races in bold indicate pole position) (Races in italics indicate fastest lap)

Year	Entrant	1	2	3	4	5	6	7	8	9	10	11	12	13	14	15	16	17	18	19	20	DC	Points
2010	Trident Racing	ESP; FEA	ESP; SPR	MON; FEA	MON; SPR	TUR; FEA	TUR; SPR	VAL; FEA	VAL; SPR	GBR; FEA	GBR; SPR	GER; FEA	GER; SPR	HUN; FEA	HUN; SPR	BEL; FEA	BEL; SPR	ITA; FEA; 7	ITA; SPR; Ret	ABU; FEA	ABU; SPR	26th	2

==== Complete GP2 Asia Series results ====
(key) (Races in bold indicate pole position) (Races in italics indicate fastest lap)

Year	Entrant	1	2	3	4	5	6	7	8	DC	Points
2009–10	DAMS	YMC1; FEA; 9	YMC1; SPR; 7	YMC2; FEA; Ret	YMC2; SPR; 16	BHR1; FEA; 15	BHR1; SPR; 5	BHR2; FEA; 8	BHR2; SPR; DNS	16th	3
