= Will Bratt =

British racing driver (born 1988)

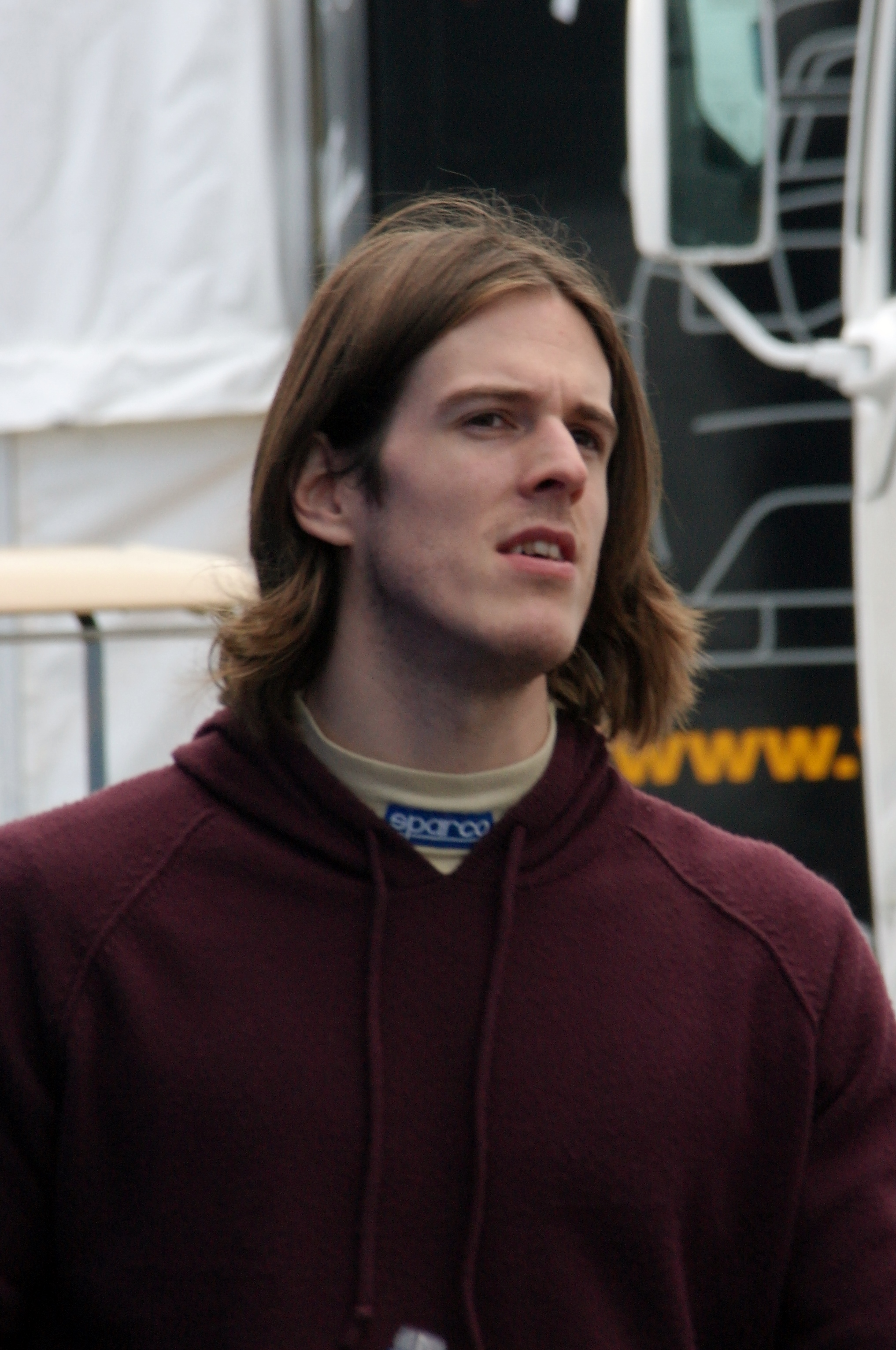
- Bratt at the Silverstone round of the 2013 British Touring Car Championship season.
- Nationality: (United Kingdom) British
- Born: William Bratt; 13 April 1988 (age 38) Oxford, England

British Touring Car Championship career
- Debut season: 2012
- Current team: Rob Austin Racing
- Categorisation: FIA Gold (until 2018); FIA Silver (2019–)
- Car number: 14
- Starts: 41
- Wins: 0
- Poles: 0
- Fastest laps: 0
- Best finish: 19th in 2013

Previous series
- 2015 2010–11 2009–10 2009 2008 2007 2005–08 2004–05 2003–04: Formula Renault 3.5 Series; Formula Two; GP2 Asia Series; Euroseries 3000; Spanish Formula Three; FPA Winter Trophy; Formula Renault 2.0 UK; FR2.0 UK Winter Series; T Cars

Championship titles
- 2009 2009 2004: Euroseries 3000; Italian Formula 3000; T Cars

Awards
- 2007: BRDC Rising Star

William Bratt (born 13 April 1988 in Oxford) is a British racing driver. He previously competed in the British Touring Car Championship with Rob Austin Racing.

== Career ==
=== T Cars ===
After three years in Super 1 karting, Bratt moved into the T Cars series for drivers between fourteen and seventeen years old, in 2003. He finished fourth in the championship in his rookie season, winning a single race at Snetterton. He dominated the 2004 season, finishing every one of the eighteen races on the podium, winning fourteen of them to win the championship by 58 points from runner-up Ruth Senior.

=== Formula Renault ===
After his T Car championship, Bratt moved into single-seaters for the 2004 Formula Renault UK Winter Series, with Scorpio Motorsport. He finished eleventh in the championship, missing out on the top-ten by just one point. This performance led to a full season campaign in 2005, staying with Scorpio. After a steady opening, Bratt recorded a best finish of eleventh twice before finishing fifteenth in the championship, and runner-up in the Graduate Cup for first-year drivers. He continued with Scorpio into the 2005 Winter Series, finishing ninth with 54 points.

Another campaign with Scorpio followed in 2006, and Bratt's results steadily improved resulting in a first win at Oulton Park. He also finished on the podium at Donington Park en route to eighth place in the championship. With six of the seven drivers who finished above him in 2006 moving out of the championship, Bratt became a championship contender for the 2007 season. Good starts from championship rivals Duncan Tappy and Dean Smith left Bratt on the back foot after the first few rounds. After achieving a double win at Croft, he added further wins at Oulton Park and Brands Hatch, but he was out of the championship running before the final few races such were the dominance of the Fortec cars of his rivals. Bratt was unopposed in third, finishing some 32 points clear of Adam Christodoulou. His performances earned him a place on the British Racing Drivers' Club's "Rising Star" scheme.

In the off-season, Bratt competed in the Formula Palmer Audi Autumn Trophy, finishing second in the series without winning a race. He also made a return to Formula Renault in the 2008 season, replacing Sho Hanawa at the Silverstone meeting in support of the World Series by Renault.

=== Formula Three ===
Bratt moved to Spain to compete in the Spanish Formula Three Championship for the 2008 season, competing for former Formula One driver Emilio de Villota's team. After two top-five finishes on his debut at Jarama, Bratt recorded both his first pole position and podium during the first race at Spa. After a barren run of just seven points in ten races, Bratt ended the season impressively with a pair of second places and a pair of third places at the final two rounds in Barcelona and Jerez, ultimately finishing fifth in the overall championship.

=== Euroseries 3000 ===
Bratt continued with de Villota's team, moving into the Euroseries 3000 for the 2009 season. Heading into the final round, Bratt was one of four drivers who could still win the title as he was only six points behind championship leader Fabio Onidi. Bratt finished first and second in the two races, with his second-place finish breaking a tie with Marco Bonanomi. Both drivers finished with 71 points and four wins, but Bratt's second gave him a 3–2 advantage in relation to the championship. Not only winning the Euroseries 3000 title, Bratt also won the Italian Formula 3000 Championship crown.

=== GP2 Series ===
As a prize for winning the Euroseries 3000 title, Bratt won a drive in the GP2 Asia Series for the 2009–10 season with Euroseries 3000 organisers Coloni Motorsport.

=== Formula Two ===
Bratt moved into the FIA Formula Two Championship in 2010.

Bratt was the only driver disqualified from a race that season. He was disqualified from the second race at Silverstone having failed to obey a drive-through penalty and being black flagged – he finished second but received no points.

Bratt came ninth in the championship out of 30 drivers with 92 points despite missing eight out of the sixteen rounds.

=== British Touring Car Championship ===
==== Rob Austin Racing (2012–2013) ====
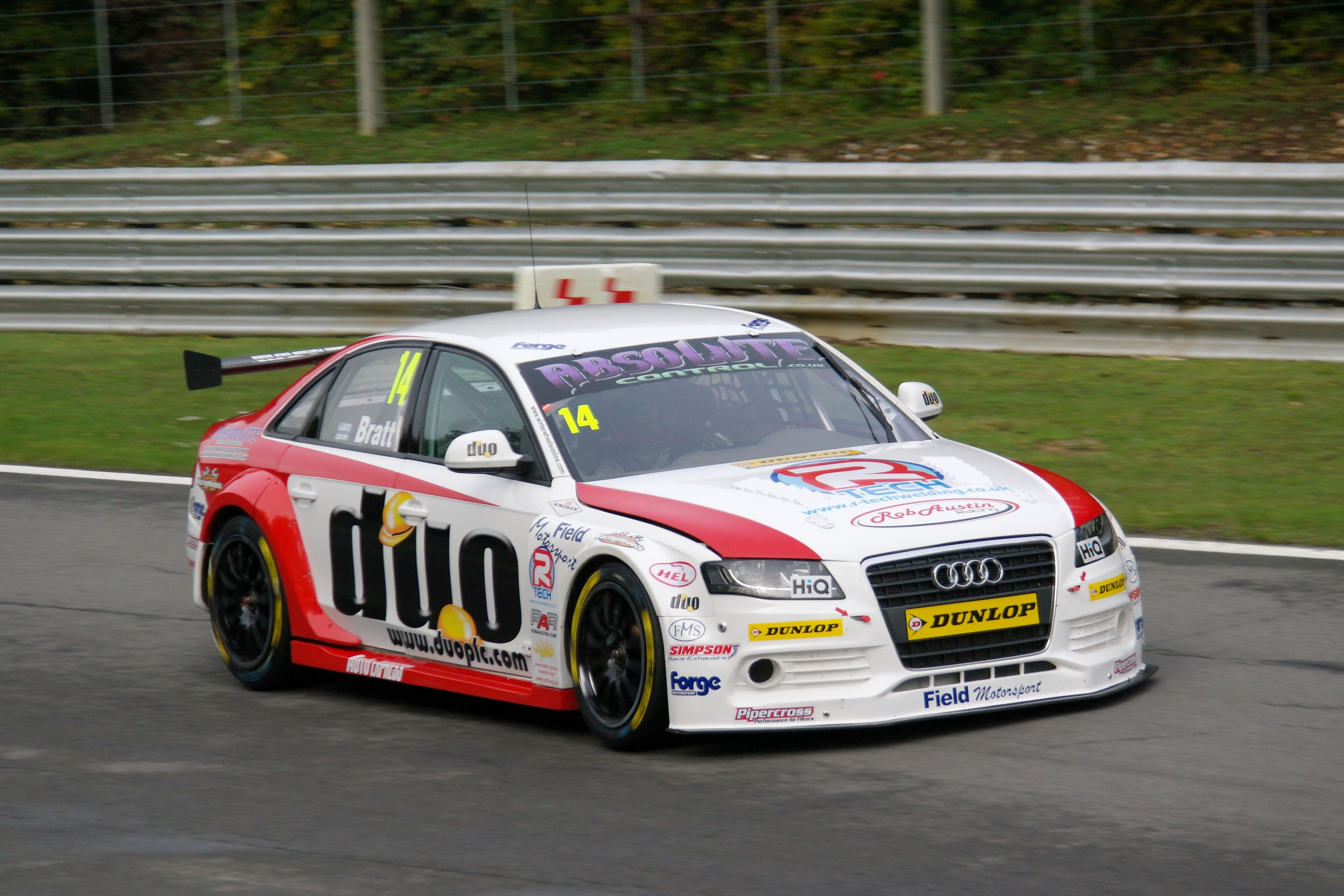
Bratt driving for Rob Austin Racing at Brands Hatch, during the 2012 British Touring Car Championship season

Bratt made his touring car debut with Rob Austin Racing at the Oulton Park round of the 2012 season. He finished eighth on his début in the Audi A4 and won Dunlop's "Most Improved Independent Driver Award". He stayed with the team for the next round at Croft but was unable to secure the sponsorship to continue in the championship at Snetterton. He returned to the team for the final three events of the season starting at Rockingham. He qualified a season best thirteenth on the grid at the final round at Brands Hatch and finished ninth in the first race before retiring from the second race having collided with the stricken BMW of Rob Collard. Bratt concluded the season 20th in the drivers standings after contesting half of the events.

Bratt would continue in the championship for the 2013 season with Rob Austin Racing, this time competing under the WIX Racing banner.

== Racing record ==
=== Career summary ===
Season	Series	Team	Races	Wins	Poles	F/Laps	Podiums	Points	Position
2003	T Cars		20	1	0	1	6	308	4th
2004	T Cars		18	14	16	16	18	350	**1st**
2004	Formula Renault UK Winter Series	Scorpio Motorsport	4	0	0	0	0	40	11th
2005	Formula Renault UK	Scorpio Motorsport	20	0	0	0	0	95	15th
2005	Formula Renault UK Winter Series	Scorpio Motorsport	4	0	0	?	0	54	9th
2006	Formula Renault UK	Apotex Scorpio Motorsport	20	1	0	0	2	263	8th
2007	Formula Renault UK	Apotex Scorpio Motorsport	20	4	2	1	7	416	**3rd**
2007	Formula Palmer Audi Winter Trophy		6	0	2	1	3	97	**2nd**
2008	Spanish Formula 3 Championship	EmiliodeVillota.com Motorsport	17	0	1	2	5	67	5th
2008	Formula Renault UK	Apotex Scorpio Motorsport	2	0	0	0	0	14	23rd
2009	Euroseries 3000	EmiliodeVillota.com Motorsport	13	4	2	3	9	71	**1st**
2009–10	GP2 Asia Series	Scuderia Coloni	8	0	0	0	0	0	25th
2010	FIA Formula Two Championship	MotorSport Vision	18	0	0	0	4	144	5th
2011	FIA Formula Two Championship	MotorSport Vision	8	1	1	0	3	92	9th
2012	British Touring Car Championship	Rob Austin Racing	15	0	0	0	0	38	20th
2013	British Touring Car Championship	WIX Racing	27	0	0	0	0	32	19th
2015	Formula Renault 3.5 Series	Pons Racing	2	0	0	0	0	0	27th
2018	Porsche Carrera Cup GB	IN2 Racing	8	0	0	0	0	18	7th
2019	Porsche Carrera Cup GB	In2Racing	2	0	0	0	0	0	NC†
2021	Porsche Carrera Cup GB - Pro	Richardson Racing	16	0	0	0	0	24	9th
2023	Le Mans Cup - LMP3	Murphy Prototypes	2	0	0	0	0	1	31st

^{†} As Bratt was a guest driver, he was ineligible to score points. ^{*} Season still in progress.

=== Complete GP2 Asia Series results ===
(key) (Races in bold indicate pole position) (Races in italics indicate fastest lap)

Year	Entrant	1	2	3	4	5	6	7	8	DC	Points
2009–10	Scuderia Coloni	ABU1; FEA; 12	ABU1; SPR; Ret	ABU2; FEA; 11	ABU2; SPR; 21	BHR1; FEA; 16	BHR1; SPR; Ret	BHR2; FEA; 15	BHR2; SPR; 16	25th	0

=== Complete FIA Formula Two Championship results ===
(key) (Races in bold indicate pole position) (Races in italics indicate fastest lap)

Year	1	2	3	4	5	6	7	8	9	10	11	12	13	14	15	16	17	18	Pos	Points
2010	SIL; 1; 6	SIL; 2; 5	MAR; 1 Ret	MAR; 2; 3	MON; 1; 4	MON; 2; 3	ZOL; 1; 14	ZOL; 2; 5	ALG; 1 Ret	ALG; 2; 5	BRH; 1; 4	BRH; 2; 3	BRN; 1; 8	BRN; 2; 10	OSC; 1; 6	OSC; 2; 7	VAL; 1; 2	VAL; 2; 15	5th	144
2011	SIL; 1; 2	SIL; 2 DSQ	MAG; 1; 8	MAG; 2; 7	SPA; 1; 1	**SPA**; **2**; 3	NÜR; 1; 7	NÜR; 2; 2	BRH; 1	BRH; 2	RBR; 1	RBR; 2	MON; 1	MON; 2	CAT; 1	CAT; 2			9th	92

=== Complete British Touring Car Championship results ===
(key) (Races in bold indicate pole position – 1 point awarded in first race) (Races in italics indicate fastest lap – 1 point awarded all races) (* signifies that driver lead race for at least one lap – 1 point given)

Year	Team	Car	1	2	3	4	5	6	7	8	9	10	11	12	13	14	15	16	17	18	19	20	21	22	23	24	25	26	27	28	29	30	DC	Points
2012	Rob Austin Racing	Audi A4	BRH; 1	BRH; 2	BRH; 3	DON; 1	DON; 2	DON; 3	THR; 1	THR; 2	THR; 3	OUL; 1; 8	OUL; 2 Ret	OUL; 3; 11	CRO; 1; 9	CRO; 2; 18	CRO; 3 Ret	SNE; 1	SNE; 2	SNE; 3	KNO; 1	KNO; 2	KNO; 3	ROC; 1 Ret	ROC; 2 Ret	ROC; 3; 15	SIL; 1; 13	SIL; 2 Ret	SIL; 3; 13	BRH; 1; 9	BRH; 2 Ret	BRH; 3; 12	20th	38
2013	Rob Austin Racing	Audi A4	BRH; 1; 12	BRH; 2 Ret	BRH; 3; 14	DON; 1; 25	DON; 2; 19	DON; 3; 14	THR; 1; 18	THR; 2; 22	THR; 3; 17	OUL; 1; 17	OUL; 2; 13	OUL; 3; 6	CRO; 1; 15	CRO; 2; 18	CRO; 3 Ret	SNE; 1 NC	SNE; 2; 16	SNE; 3 Ret	KNO; 1; 20	KNO; 2 Ret	KNO; 3; 10	ROC; 1 Ret	ROC; 2 DNS	ROC; 3 Ret	SIL; 1; 22	SIL; 2; 12	SIL; 3 Ret	BRH; 1	BRH; 2	BRH; 3	19th	32

=== Complete Formula Renault 3.5 Series results ===
(key) (Races in bold indicate pole position; races in italics indicate fastest lap)

Year	Team	1	2	3	4	5	6	7	8	9	10	11	12	13	14	15	16	17	Pos	Points
2015	Pons Racing	ALC; 1	ALC; 2	MON; 1	SPA; 1	SPA; 2	HUN; 1	HUN; 2	RBR; 1	RBR; 2	SIL; 1; 12	SIL; 2; 15	NÜR; 1	NÜR; 2	BUG; 1	BUG; 2	JER; 1	JER; 2	27th	0

== Personal ==
Bratt attended Bloxham School, Oxfordshire and has a degree in history from Lincoln College, Oxford.

Will Bratt is also a musician (guitarist and writer) and plays in the popular Oxfordshire-based cover band Mr Blue and Little Liars.

Sporting positions
Preceded by Simon Walker-Hansell	T Cars Champion; 2004	Succeeded by Adrian Quaife-Hobbs
Preceded by Nicolas Prost	Euroseries 3000; Champion; 2009	Succeeded by Romain Grosjean (AutoGP)
Preceded by Omar Leal	Italian Formula 3000; Champion; 2009	Succeeded by Romain Grosjean (AutoGP)
