= 2010 Bahrain International Circuit GP2 Asia Series round (February) =

Car racing competition

2010 Bahrain GP2 round
Round details
- Round 3 of 4 rounds in the 2010 GP2 Series
- Bahrain International Circuit
- Location: Bahrain International Circuit, Sakhir, Bahrain
- Course: Permanent racing facility 5.554 km (3.451 mi)

GP2 Series

Feature race
- Date: 26 February 2010
- Laps: 34

Pole position
Driver	(France) Jules Bianchi	ART Grand Prix
- Time: 1:43.474

Podium
First	(Italy) Davide Valsecchi	iSport International
Second	(Italy) Luca Filippi	MalaysiaQi-Meritus.com
Third	(Spain) Javier Villa	Arden International

Fastest lap
Driver	(Spain) Javier Villa	Arden International
- Time: 1:47.035 (on lap 10)

Sprint race
- Date: 27 February 2010
- Laps: 23

Podium
First	(France) Charles Pic	Arden International
Second	(Italy) Giacomo Ricci	DPR
Third	(Spain) Javier Villa	Arden International

Fastest lap
Driver	(France) Jules Bianchi (Note: Jules Bianchi set the fastest lap, but did not finish in the top 10, so was ineligible to be the point-scorer for the fastest lap. Giacomo Ricci was the point-scorer instead for setting the fastest lap of those finishing in the top 10.)	ART Grand Prix
- Time: 1:46.499 (on lap 9)

The 2009–10 Bahrain 1st GP2 Asia round was the third round of the 2009-10 GP2 Asia Series season. It was held on February 26 and 27, 2010 at Bahrain International Circuit at Sakhir, Bahrain, together with 2010 V8 Supercar Championship Series 2010 Desert 400. It was the first of two rounds to be held at the circuit, the other being the 2009-10 Bahrain 2nd GP2 Asia round. The layout used for this Race will not be used for the following event, as it acts as a F1 Support race.

== Report ==
=== Feature race ===
Despite Jules Bianchi starting on Pole, Davide Valsecchi clinched the GP2 Asia title with three rounds to spare by winning in the Bahrain feature race. The iSport driver lurked in third for most of the distance, before mounting another late surge which has become his characteristic this year, to overcome Arden's Javier Villa and Meritus' Luca Filippi and claim his third victory in five rounds. With Valsecchi's nearest rival and team-mate Oliver Turvey delayed in the pits and unable to score, the win gave Valsecchi an insurmountable points lead. Filippi and Villa burst from the second row into the lead at the start, while polesitter Jules Bianchi (ART) immediately fell out of contention for victory for a very poor start. Villa looked faster than Filippi in the opening laps, but with no way past on track, he dived in for an early stop. The extra speed on fresh tyres paid dividends for Villa, and by the time the pitstops were complete he was in the lead ahead of Filippi and Valsecchi.

As has been the case throughout the championship, Valsecchi got quicker and quicker as the race progressed. An initial dive-bomb move on Filippi for second saw him skitter over the run-off at the Turn 10 hairpin, but he quickly regrouped and passed his countryman into Turn 1 with six laps to go. He then caught Villa in just one lap and took the lead with a straightforward outbraking move - only to then run wide at Turn 10 later in the lap and hand first place back again. It was only a brief respite for Villa though, as Valsecchi soon repassed him into the first corner and pulled away to secure victory. Villa lost more pace as his tyres faded, allowing Filippi to drive around the outside of him and take second. DPR's Giacomo Ricci came within 0.2 seconds of depriving Villa of third too as they diced on the final lap. Charles Pic took the second Arden car to fifth ahead of Coloni's returnee Alvaro Parente and Addax's Sergio Pérez. Adrian Zaugg got quicker throughout the race on his return with Trident, charging past Turvey and Bianchi in the closing stages to claim eighth and pole for race two. Turvey had lost several places in his pitstop with a wheelgun problem while Bianchi never got up to speed after dropping down the order at the start.

=== Sprint race ===
In race 2 Charles Pic earned his first GP2 Asia/GP2 win by breaking away from the early chaos in the Bahrain Sprint race. The Frenchman overtook initial leader Adrian Zaugg and then escaped from his pursuers while they spent the next few laps tripping over each other. For much of the race it looked like Arden would score a one-two, with Pic's team-mate Javier Villa all over the back of second placed Giacomo Ricci. But the latter picked up his pace later on and charged away to secure DPR's third podium finish in the last two events. Having gained pole position on the partially reversed grid thanks to his eighth place yesterday, Zaugg (Trident) led into the first corners while Coloni's Alvaro Parente and Addax's Sergio Pérez fought for second. The pair ended up banging wheels approaching Turn 4, leaving Pérez with a broken wing and sending Parente spinning into the barriers as his apparently wounded car broke loose on the following downhill sweeps. There was more contact further down the pack, and newly crowned champion Davide Valsecchi (iSport) had to pit for a new wing, while race one podium finisher Luca Filippi (Meritus) spun down the order. Leader Zaugg did not have the pace to pull away and soon had Pic, Ricci, ART's fast-starting Jules Bianchi and Villa queuing up behind him.

Pic dived ahead at the end of the backstraight on lap four, with Ricci then following him in the next corner. As Zaugg tried to fight back, Bianchi got alongside him as well, with all three cars wheel to wheel through the last turn, down the pitstraight and into the first complex - where it ended in tears as contact damaged Zaugg and Bianchi's cars. That settled the top three positions, Pic having pulled clear and Ricci eventually dropping Villa and securing second. Rapax's Daniel Zampieri had emerged from the mayhem in fourth, but was hunted down as the race progressed - Sam Bird (ART) and Edoardo Piscopo (DAMS) demoting him in the closing stages. Zampieri then handed the final point to iSport's Oliver Turvey when he ran wide while trying to fend off the Briton with two laps to go, and also dropped behind his charging Rapax team-mate Vladimir Arabadzhiev. Turvey's sixth place ensured that iSport wrapped up the teams' title alongside Valsecchi's drivers' crown. Among the other incidents in the race, Meritus driver Alexander Rossi received a ten place grid penalty for the next round after forcing Ocean's Fabio Leimer off the track. The American eventually broke his front wing on the back of Leimer's car and then slid into Coloni's Will Bratt, ending both their races early.

== Classification ==
=== Qualifying ===
Pos	No	Driver	Team	Time	Gap	Grid
1	7	(France) Jules Bianchi	ART Grand Prix	1:43.474		1
2	17	(Italy) Davide Valsecchi	iSport International	1:43.478	+0.004	2
3	12	(Spain) Javier Villa	Arden International	1:43.519	+0.045	3
4	20	(Italy) Luca Filippi	MalaysiaQi-Meritus.com	1:43.523	+0.049	4
5	24	(Portugal) Álvaro Parente	Scuderia Coloni	1:43.714	+0.240	5
6	16	(United Kingdom) Oliver Turvey	iSport International	1:43.818	+0.344	6
7	27	(Italy) Giacomo Ricci	DPR	1:43.918	+0.444	7
8	1	(Germany) Christian Vietoris	DAMS	1:44.086	+0.612	8
9	11	(France) Charles Pic	Arden International	1:44.172	+0.698	9
10	6	(Mexico) Sergio Pérez	Barwa Addax Team	1:44.246	+0.772	10
11	8	(United Kingdom) Sam Bird	ART Grand Prix	1:44.253	+0.779	11
12	2	(Italy) Edoardo Piscopo	DAMS	1:44.338	+0.864	12
13	5	(United Kingdom) Max Chilton	Barwa Addax Team	1:44.617	+1.143	13
14	26	(Romania) Michael Herck	DPR	1:44.671	+1.197	14
15	21	(United States) Alexander Rossi	MalaysiaQi-Meritus.com	1:44.713	+1.239	15
16	22	(Netherlands) Yelmer Buurman	Ocean Racing Technology	1:44.724	+1.250	16
17	3	(Bulgaria) Vladimir Arabadzhiev	Rapax	1:44.759	+1.285	17
18	18	(South Africa) Adrian Zaugg	Trident Racing	1:44.781	+1.307	18
19	4	(Italy) Daniel Zampieri	Rapax	1:45.079	+1.605	19
20	25	(United Kingdom) Will Bratt	Scuderia Coloni	1:45.320	+1.846	20
21	23	(Switzerland) Fabio Leimer	Ocean Racing Technology	1:45.371	+1.897	21
22	15	(Czech Republic) Josef Král	Super Nova Racing	1:45.424	+1.950	22
23	14	(United States) Jake Rosenzweig	Super Nova Racing	1:45.980	+2.506	23
24	19	(Bulgaria) Plamen Kralev	Trident Racing	1:47.243	+3.769	24

=== Feature race ===
Pos	No	Driver	Team	Laps	Time/Retired	Grid	Points
1	17	(Italy) Davide Valsecchi	iSport International	34	1:02.05.146	2	10
2	20	(Italy) Luca Filippi	MalaysiaQi-Meritus.com	34	+2.792	4	8
3	12	(Spain) Javier Villa	Arden International	34	+6.067	3	6+1
4	27	(Italy) Giacomo Ricci	DPR	34	+6.238	7	5
5	11	(France) Charles Pic	Arden International	34	+13.026	9	4
6	24	(Portugal) Álvaro Parente	Scuderia Coloni	34	+17.777	5	3
7	6	(Mexico) Sergio Pérez	Barwa Addax Team	34	+23.948	10	2
8	18	(South Africa) Adrian Zaugg	Trident Racing	34	+25.479	18	1
9	16	(United Kingdom) Oliver Turvey	iSport International	34	+29.253	6	
10	7	(France) Jules Bianchi	ART Grand Prix	34	+33.238	1	2
11	4	(Italy) Daniel Zampieri	Rapax	34	+34.509	19	
12	22	(Netherlands) Yelmer Buurman	Ocean Racing Technology	34	+39.513	16	
13	8	(United Kingdom) Sam Bird	ART Grand Prix	34	+40.415	11	
14	1	(Germany) Christian Vietoris	DAMS	34	+41.750	8	
15	2	(Italy) Edoardo Piscopo	DAMS	34	+45.779	12	
16	25	(United Kingdom) Will Bratt	Scuderia Coloni	34	+46.803	20	
17	3	(Bulgaria) Vladimir Arabadzhiev	Rapax	34	+48.577	17	
18	5	(United Kingdom) Max Chilton	Barwa Addax Team	34	+1:05.086	13	
19	14	(United States) Jake Rosenzweig	Super Nova Racing	34	+1:06.211	23	
20	23	(Switzerland) Fabio Leimer	Ocean Racing Technology	34	+1:23.385	21	
21	15	(Czech Republic) Josef Král	Super Nova Racing	34	+1:53.049	22	
22	19	(Bulgaria) Plamen Kralev	Trident Racing	33	+1 lap	24	
23	26	(Romania) Michael Herck	DPR	32	+2 laps	14	
Ret	21	(United States) Alexander Rossi	MalaysiaQi-Meritus.com	26	DNF	15	

=== Sprint race ===
Pos	No	Driver	Team	Laps	Time/Retired	Grid	Points
1	11	(France) Charles Pic	Arden International	23	41:11.960	4	6
2	27	(Italy) Giacomo Ricci	DPR	23	+3.586	5	5+1
3	12	(Spain) Javier Villa	Arden International	23	+9.371	6	4
4	8	(United Kingdom) Sam Bird	ART Grand Prix	23	+22.388	13	3
5	2	(Italy) Edoardo Piscopo	DAMS	23	+23.193	15	2
6	16	(United Kingdom) Oliver Turvey	iSport International	23	+25.110	9	1
7	3	(Bulgaria) Vladimir Arabadzhiev	Rapax	23	+25.866	17	
8	4	(Italy) Daniel Zampieri	Rapax	23	+28.950	11	
9	1	(Germany) Christian Vietoris	DAMS	23	+32.499	14	
10	22	(Netherlands) Yelmer Buurman	Ocean Racing Technology	23	+33.076	12	
11	15	(Czech Republic) Josef Král	Super Nova Racing	23	+33.489	21	
12	5	(United Kingdom) Max Chilton	Barwa Addax Team	23	+36.437	18	
13	26	(Romania) Michael Herck	DPR	23	+36.694	23	
14	14	(United States) Jake Rosenzweig	Super Nova Racing	23	+47.789	19	
15	23	(Switzerland) Fabio Leimer	Ocean Racing Technology	23	+49.289	20	
16	19	(Bulgaria) Plamen Kralev	Trident Racing	23	+1:27.838	22	
17	6	(Mexico) Sergio Pérez	Barwa Addax Team	23	+1:29.653	2	
18	20	(Italy) Luca Filippi	MalaysiaQi-Meritus.com	23	+1:36.832	7	
19	18	(South Africa) Adrian Zaugg	Trident Racing	22	+1 lap	1	
20	17	(Italy) Davide Valsecchi	iSport International	22	+1 lap	8	
NC	7	(France) Jules Bianchi	ART Grand Prix	19	+4 laps	10	
Ret	25	(United Kingdom) Will Bratt	Scuderia Coloni	2	DNF	16	
Ret	21	(United States) Alexander Rossi	MalaysiaQi-Meritus.com	2	DNF	24	
Ret	24	(Portugal) Álvaro Parente	Scuderia Coloni	0	DNF	3	

== Standings after the race ==
Drivers' Championship standings

	Pos	Driver	Points
	1	(Italy) Davide Valsecchi	45
5	2	(Italy) Giacomo Ricci	19
1	3	(United Kingdom) Oliver Turvey	17
1	4	(Italy) Luca Filippi	16
6	5	(Spain) Javier Villa	16

Teams' Championship standings

	Pos	Team	Points
	1	(United Kingdom) iSport International	62
5	2	(Netherlands) Arden International	28
1	3	(United Kingdom) DPR	26
	4	(Malaysia) MalaysiaQi-Meritus.com	19
2	5	(United Kingdom) Super Nova Racing	14

- Note: Only the top five positions are included for both sets of standings.

== See also ==
- 2010 Desert 400

== Notes ==
Previous round: 2010 Yas Marina GP2 Asia Series round	GP2 Asia Series Championship; 2009–10 season	Next round: 2010 Bahrain 2nd GP2 Asia Series round
Previous round: 2009 Bahrain 2nd GP2 Asia Series round	Bahrain GP2 Asia round	Next round: 2010 Bahrain 2nd GP2 Asia Series round
