= 2009–10 GP2 Asia Series =

Third season of the GP2 Asia Series

The 2009–10 GP2 Asia Series season was the third season of the GP2 Asia Series. It began on 31 October 2009 and ended on 14 March 2010 after four double-header rounds.

== Season summary ==
All teams from the 2009 GP2 Series season except for Racing Engineering were due to take part, with the thirteenth slot being filled by MalaysiaQi-Meritus.com. Durango withdrew from the season for financial reasons. The season was the last to use the first specification of the GP2/05 car, as used in Europe between 2005 and 2007.

Davide Valsecchi of iSport International won the drivers' championship title, clinching it with three races to spare, in Bahrain after a comprehensive performance in the first five races, winning a race at each of the first three meetings with two seconds before clinching the title. He added a fourth second place at the final round, to seal a 27-point championship-winning margin. Second place was settled by a tie-breaker between a pair of Italian drivers, MalaysiaQi-Meritus.com driver Luca Filippi and DPR's Giacomo Ricci. Despite not scoring in any of the sprint races to be held, a win and two second places in feature races for Filippi compared to six top-five finishes – including a first GP2 win at the final Bahrain race – for Ricci allowed Filippi to take the runner-up spot. Arden International drivers completed the top-five placings with Javier Villa fourth despite missing the first meeting at Abu Dhabi, and Charles Pic fifth, the only other driver to win a race during the campaign, winning at the first Bahrain meeting. In the teams' championship, iSport won the championship with two races to spare, after the points amassed by Valsecchi and Oliver Turvey put them out of reach of their rivals. Second place, 36 points behind iSport, were Arden due to the strong performances of Villa and Pic, while Ricci's DPR squad finished third, a point further back.

== Teams and drivers ==
All of the teams used the Dallara GP2/05 chassis with Renault-badged 4.0 litre (244 cu in) naturally-aspirated Mecachrome V8 engines order and with tyres supplied by Bridgestone.

Team	No.	Driver	Rounds
(France) DAMS	1	(Germany) Christian Vietoris	All
(France) DAMS	2	(Italy) Edoardo Piscopo	All
(Brazil) Piquet GP	3	(Bulgaria) Vladimir Arabadzhiev	1
(Brazil) Piquet GP	4	(Italy) Daniel Zampieri	1
(Italy) Rapax	3	(Bulgaria) Vladimir Arabadzhiev	2–4
(Italy) Rapax	4	(Italy) Daniel Zampieri	2–3
(Italy) Rapax	4	(Brazil) Luiz Razia	4
(Spain) Barwa Addax Team	5	(United Kingdom) Max Chilton	1, 3–4
(Spain) Barwa Addax Team	5	(Netherlands) Giedo van der Garde	2
(Spain) Barwa Addax Team	6	(Brazil) Luiz Razia	1
(Spain) Barwa Addax Team	6	(Mexico) Sergio Pérez	2–3
(Spain) Barwa Addax Team	6	(Venezuela) Rodolfo González	4
(France) ART Grand Prix	7	(Sweden) Marcus Ericsson	1
(France) ART Grand Prix	7	(France) Jules Bianchi	2–4
(France) ART Grand Prix	8	(United Kingdom) Sam Bird	All
(Netherlands) Arden International (Note: Arden International competed under a Dutch licence.)	11	(France) Charles Pic	All
(Netherlands) Arden International	12	(Venezuela) Rodolfo González	1
(Netherlands) Arden International	12	(Spain) Javier Villa	2–4
(United Kingdom) Super Nova Racing	14	(United Kingdom) James Jakes	1
(United Kingdom) Super Nova Racing	14	(Sweden) Marcus Ericsson	2
(United Kingdom) Super Nova Racing	14	(United States) Jake Rosenzweig	3–4
(United Kingdom) Super Nova Racing	15	(Czech Republic) Josef Král	All
(United Kingdom) iSport International	16	(United Kingdom) Oliver Turvey	All
(United Kingdom) iSport International	17	(Italy) Davide Valsecchi	All
(Italy) Trident Racing	18	(Venezuela) Johnny Cecotto Jr.	1
(Italy) Trident Racing	18	(Spain) Dani Clos	2, 4
(Italy) Trident Racing	18	(South Africa) Adrian Zaugg	3
(Italy) Trident Racing	19	(Bulgaria) Plamen Kralev	All
(Malaysia) MalaysiaQi-Meritus.com	20	(Italy) Luca Filippi	All
(Malaysia) MalaysiaQi-Meritus.com	21	(Brazil) Diego Nunes	1
(Malaysia) MalaysiaQi-Meritus.com	21	(United States) Alexander Rossi	2–4
(Portugal) Ocean Racing Technology	22	(United States) Alexander Rossi	1
(Portugal) Ocean Racing Technology	22	(United Kingdom) Max Chilton	2
(Portugal) Ocean Racing Technology	22	(Netherlands) Yelmer Buurman	3–4
(Portugal) Ocean Racing Technology	23	(Switzerland) Fabio Leimer	All
(Italy) Scuderia Coloni	24	(Spain) Roldán Rodríguez	1
(Italy) Scuderia Coloni	24	(Brazil) Alberto Valerio	2
(Italy) Scuderia Coloni	24	(Portugal) Álvaro Parente	3–4
(Italy) Scuderia Coloni	25	(United Kingdom) Will Bratt	All
(United Kingdom) DPR	26	(Romania) Michael Herck	All
(United Kingdom) DPR	27	(Italy) Giacomo Ricci	All

== Calendar ==
The season started with a two-day test over 23–24 October 2009 in Abu Dhabi at the new Yas Marina Circuit. The series returned there a week later for the opening championship rounds, in support of the 2009 Abu Dhabi Grand Prix.

A further round took place in Abu Dhabi, before the series moved to Bahrain.

=== Race Calendar and results ===
Round		Circuit	Date	Pole position	Fastest Lap	Winning driver	Winning team	Report
1	F	(United Arab Emirates) Yas Marina Circuit	31 October	(Italy) Davide Valsecchi	(Italy) Davide Valsecchi	(Italy) Davide Valsecchi	(United Kingdom) iSport International	Report
1	S	(United Arab Emirates) Yas Marina Circuit	1 November		(United Kingdom) Sam Bird (Note: Sam Bird set the fastest lap, but did not finish in the top 10, so was ineligible to be the point-scorer for the fastest lap. Davide Valsecchi was the point-scorer instead for setting the fastest lap of those finishing in the top 10.)	(Germany) Christian Vietoris	(France) DAMS	Report
2	F	(United Arab Emirates) Yas Marina Circuit	5 February	(France) Charles Pic	(Bulgaria) Vladimir Arabadzhiev (Note: Vladimir Arabadzhiev set the fastest lap, but did not finish in the top 10, so was ineligible to be the point-scorer for the fastest lap. Davide Valsecchi was the point-scorer instead for setting the fastest lap of those finishing in the top 10.)	(United Kingdom) Oliver Turvey	(United Kingdom) iSport International	Report
2	S	(United Arab Emirates) Yas Marina Circuit	6 February		(Italy) Davide Valsecchi	(Italy) Davide Valsecchi	(United Kingdom) iSport International	Report
3	F	Bahrain International Circuit (Grand Prix Circuit)	26 February	(France) Jules Bianchi	(Spain) Javier Villa	(Italy) Davide Valsecchi	(United Kingdom) iSport International	Report
3	S	Bahrain International Circuit (Grand Prix Circuit)	27 February		(France) Jules Bianchi (Note: Jules Bianchi set the fastest lap, but did not finish in the top 10, so was ineligible to be the point-scorer for the fastest lap. Giacomo Ricci was the point-scorer instead for setting the fastest lap of those finishing in the top 10.)	(France) Charles Pic	(Netherlands) Arden International	Report
4	F	Bahrain International Circuit (Endurance Circuit)	13 March	(Italy) Luca Filippi	(Italy) Luca Filippi	(Italy) Luca Filippi	(Malaysia) MalaysiaQi-Meritus.com	Report
4	S	Bahrain International Circuit (Endurance Circuit)	14 March		(France) Jules Bianchi (Note: Jules Bianchi set the fastest lap, but did not finish in the top 10, so was ineligible to be the point-scorer for the fastest lap. Sam Bird was the point-scorer instead for setting the fastest lap of those finishing in the top 10.)	(Italy) Giacomo Ricci	(United Kingdom) DPR	Report

== Championship standings ==
Scoring system

Points are awarded to the top 8 classified finishers in the Feature race, and to the top 6 classified finishers in the Sprint race. The pole-sitter in the feature race will also receive two points, and one point is given to the driver who set the fastest lap inside the top ten in both the feature and sprint races. No extra points are awarded to the pole-sitter in the sprint race.

Point system for Feature Race
Position	**1st**	**2nd**	**3rd**	**4th**	**5th**	**6th**	**7th**	**8th**	**Pole**	**FL**
Points	10	8	6	5	4	3	2	1	2	1

Point system for Sprint Race
Position	**1st**	**2nd**	**3rd**	**4th**	**5th**	**6th**	**FL**
Points	6	5	4	3	2	1	1

=== Drivers' Championship ===
Pos	Driver	YMC1 (United Arab Emirates)		YMC2 (United Arab Emirates)		BHR1 (Bahrain)		BHR2 (Bahrain)		Points
1	(Italy) Davide Valsecchi	**1**	2	2	1	1	20	2	4	56
2	(Italy) Luca Filippi	2	8	14†	17	2	18	**1**	8	29
3	(Italy) Giacomo Ricci	Ret	Ret	5	3	4	2	5	1	29
4	(Spain) Javier Villa			4	11	3	3	7	6	19
5	(France) Charles Pic	Ret	15	**10**	8	5	1	3	19	18
6	(United Kingdom) Oliver Turvey	8	4	1	5	9	6	9	11	17
7	(United Kingdom) Sam Bird	18†	18	Ret	Ret	13	4	6	2	12
8	(Portugal) Álvaro Parente					6	Ret	4	3	12
9	(United States) Alexander Rossi	4	5	6	9	Ret	Ret	11	5	12
10	(Germany) Christian Vietoris	6	1	Ret	14	14	9	Ret	14	9
11	(Czech Republic) Josef Král	5	3	9	Ret	21	11	16	10	8
12	(France) Jules Bianchi			3	7	**10**	NC	10	Ret	8
13	(Romania) Michael Herck	13	9	7	2	23	13	18	Ret	7
14	(United Kingdom) James Jakes	3	10							6
15	(Mexico) Sergio Pérez			12	4	7	17			5
16	(Italy) Edoardo Piscopo	9	7	Ret	16	15	5	8	DNS	3
17	(Venezuela) Johnny Cecotto Jr.	7	6							3
18	(United Kingdom) Max Chilton	16	17	8	6	18	12	19†	15	2
19	(South Africa) Adrian Zaugg					8	19			1
20	(Bulgaria) Vladimir Arabadzhiev	Ret	Ret	13	10	17	7	12	9	0
21	(Netherlands) Yelmer Buurman					12	10	13	7	0
22	(Italy) Daniel Zampieri	15	Ret	Ret	15	11	8			0
23	(Spain) Roldán Rodríguez	10	14							0
24	(Sweden) Marcus Ericsson	11	12	17†	12					0
25	(United Kingdom) Will Bratt	12	Ret	11	21†	16	Ret	15	16	0
26	(Brazil) Luiz Razia	Ret	11					Ret	13	0
27	(Spain) Dani Clos			Ret	13			14	12	0
28	(Brazil) Diego Nunes	Ret	13							0
29	(Venezuela) Rodolfo González	14	16					Ret	Ret	0
30	(United States) Jake Rosenzweig					19	14	17	17	0
31	(Switzerland) Fabio Leimer	17	Ret	Ret	Ret	20	15	Ret	DNS	0
32	(Brazil) Alberto Valerio			15	18					0
33	(Bulgaria) Plamen Kralev	Ret	Ret	16	20	22	16	Ret	18	0
34	(Netherlands) Giedo van der Garde			Ret	19					0
Pos	Driver	YMC1 (United Arab Emirates)		YMC2 (United Arab Emirates)		BHR1 (Bahrain)		BHR2 (Bahrain)		Points

Key
Colour	Result
Gold	Winner
Silver	2nd place
Bronze	3rd place
Green	Other points position
Blue	Other classified position
Blue	Not classified, finished (NC)
Purple	Not classified, retired (Ret)
Red	Did not qualify (DNQ)
Red	Did not pre-qualify (DNPQ)
Black	Disqualified (DSQ)
White	Did not start (DNS)
White	Race cancelled (C)
Blank	Did not practice (DNP)
Blank	Excluded (EX)
Blank	Did not arrive (DNA)
Blank	Withdrawn (WD)
Text formatting	Meaning
**Bold**	Pole position point(s)
Italics	Fastest lap point(s)

Notes:

- † — Drivers did not finish the race, but were classified as they completed over 90% of the race distance.

=== Teams' Championship ===
Pos	Team	Car No.	YMC1 (United Arab Emirates)		YMC2 (United Arab Emirates)		BHR1 (Bahrain)		BHR2 (Bahrain)		Points
1	(United Kingdom) iSport International	16	8	4	1	5	9	6	9	11	73
1	(United Kingdom) iSport International	17	**1**	2	2	1	1	20	2	4	73
2	(Netherlands) Arden International	11	Ret	15	**10**	8	5	1	3	19	37
2	(Netherlands) Arden International	12	14	16	4	11	3	3	7	6	37
3	(United Kingdom) DPR	26	13	9	7	2	23	13	18	Ret	36
3	(United Kingdom) DPR	27	Ret	Ret	5	3	4	2	5	1	36
4	(Malaysia) MalaysiaQi-Meritus.com	20	2	8	14†	17	2	18	**1**	8	34
4	(Malaysia) MalaysiaQi-Meritus.com	21	Ret	13	6	9	Ret	Ret	11	5	34
5	(France) ART Grand Prix	7	11	12	3	7	**10**	NC	10	Ret	20
5	(France) ART Grand Prix	8	18†	18	Ret	Ret	13	4	6	2	20
6	(United Kingdom) Super Nova Racing	14	3	10	17†	12	19	14	17	17	14
6	(United Kingdom) Super Nova Racing	15	5	3	9	Ret	21	11	16	10	14
7	(France) DAMS	1	6	1	Ret	14	14	9	Ret	14	12
7	(France) DAMS	2	9	7	Ret	16	15	5	8	DNS	12
8	(Italy) Scuderia Coloni	24	10	14	15	18	6	Ret	4	3	12
8	(Italy) Scuderia Coloni	25	12	Ret	11	21†	16	Ret	15	16	12
9	(Portugal) Ocean Racing Technology	22	4	5	8	6	12	10	13	7	9
9	(Portugal) Ocean Racing Technology	23	17	Ret	Ret	Ret	20	15	Ret	DNS	9
10	(Spain) Barwa Addax Team	5	16	17	Ret	19	18	12	19†	15	5
10	(Spain) Barwa Addax Team	6	Ret	11	12	4	7	17	Ret	Ret	5
11	(Italy) Trident Racing	18	7	6	Ret	13	8	19	14	12	4
11	(Italy) Trident Racing	19	Ret	Ret	16	20	22	16	Ret	18	4
12	(Italy) Rapax	3			13	10	17	7	12	9	0
12	(Italy) Rapax	4			Ret	15	11	8	Ret	13	0
13	(Brazil) Piquet GP	3	Ret	Ret							0
13	(Brazil) Piquet GP	4	15	Ret							0
Pos	Team	Car No.	YMC1 (United Arab Emirates)		YMC2 (United Arab Emirates)		BHR1 (Bahrain)		BHR2 (Bahrain)		Points

Key
Colour	Result
Gold	Winner
Silver	2nd place
Bronze	3rd place
Green	Other points position
Blue	Other classified position
Blue	Not classified, finished (NC)
Purple	Not classified, retired (Ret)
Red	Did not qualify (DNQ)
Red	Did not pre-qualify (DNPQ)
Black	Disqualified (DSQ)
White	Did not start (DNS)
White	Race cancelled (C)
Blank	Did not practice (DNP)
Blank	Excluded (EX)
Blank	Did not arrive (DNA)
Blank	Withdrawn (WD)
Text formatting	Meaning
**Bold**	Pole position point(s)
Italics	Fastest lap point(s)

Notes:

- † — Drivers did not finish the race, but were classified as they completed over 90% of the race distance.
