= 2010 Bahrain International Circuit GP2 Asia Series round (March) =

Car racing competition

2010 Bahrain GP2 round
Round details
- Round 4 of 4 rounds in the 2010 GP2 Series
- Bahrain International Circuit
- Location: Bahrain International Circuit, Sakhir, Bahrain
- Course: Permanent racing facility 6.299 km (3.914 mi)

GP2 Series

Feature race
- Date: 13 March 2010
- Laps: 29

Pole position
Driver	(Italy) Luca Filippi	MalaysiaQi-Meritus.com
- Time: 2:07.087

Podium
First	(Italy) Luca Filippi	MalaysiaQi-Meritus.com
Second	(Italy) Davide Valsecchi	iSport International
Third	(France) Charles Pic	Arden International

Fastest lap
Driver	(Italy) Luca Filippi	MalaysiaQi-Meritus.com
- Time: 2:09.823 (on lap 27)

Sprint race
- Date: 14 March 2010
- Laps: 20

Podium
First	(Italy) Giacomo Ricci	DPR
Second	(United Kingdom) Sam Bird	ART Grand Prix
Third	(Portugal) Álvaro Parente	Scuderia Coloni

Fastest lap
Driver	(France) Jules Bianchi (Note: Jules Bianchi set the fastest lap, but did not finish in the top 10, so was ineligible to be the point-scorer for the fastest lap. Sam Bird was the point-scorer instead for setting the fastest lap of those finishing in the top 10.)	ART Grand Prix
- Time: 2:09.787 (on lap 3)

The 2009-10 Bahrain 2nd GP2 Asia round was the fourth and final round of the 2009-10 GP2 Asia Series season. It was held on March 13 and 14, 2010 at Bahrain International Circuit at Sakhir, Bahrain. It was the second of two rounds to be held at the circuit, the other being the 2009-10 Bahrain 1st GP2 Asia round. This event will support the 2010 Bahrain Grand Prix, and therefore use a different layout to an earlier race in the series, The Endurance Circuit.

Luca Filippi started from pole position, won the race (first win for MalaysiaQi-Meritus.com and set fastest lap, forming a perfect weekend. Sprint race was won by Filippi's countryman Giacomo Ricci, which also brought the first victory for his team DPR.

This was the last race for the original GP2 car, the Dallara GP2/05, as it was replaced by the Dallara GP2/11 for 2011.

== Classification ==
=== Qualifying ===
Pos	No	Driver	Team	Time	Gap	Grid
1	20	(Italy) Luca Filippi	MalaysiaQi-Meritus.com	2:07.087		1
2	11	(France) Charles Pic	Arden International	2:07.178	+0.091	2
3	16	(United Kingdom) Oliver Turvey	iSport International	2:07.237	+0.150	3
4	17	(Italy) Davide Valsecchi	iSport International	2:07.243	+0.156	4
5	24	(Portugal) Álvaro Parente	Scuderia Coloni	2:07.413	+0.326	5
6	12	(Spain) Javier Villa	Arden International	2:07.432	+0.345	6
7	7	(France) Jules Bianchi	ART Grand Prix	2:07.710	+0.623	7
8	4	(Brazil) Luiz Razia	Rapax	2:07.772	+0.685	8
9	27	(Italy) Giacomo Ricci	DPR	2:07.892	+0.805	9
10	21	(United States) Alexander Rossi	MalaysiaQi-Meritus.com	2:08.027	+0.940	20^{1}
11	8	(United Kingdom) Sam Bird	ART Grand Prix	2:08.339	+1.252	10
12	23	(Switzerland) Fabio Leimer	Ocean Racing Technology	2:08.428	+1.341	11
13	18	(Spain) Dani Clos	Trident Racing	2:08.467	+1.380	12
14	26	(Romania) Michael Herck	DPR	2:08.634	+1.547	13
15	1	(Germany) Christian Vietoris	DAMS	2:08.678	+1.591	14
16	5	(United Kingdom) Max Chilton	Barwa Addax Team	2:08.692	+1.605	15
17	22	(Netherlands) Yelmer Buurman	Ocean Racing Technology	2:08.778	+1.691	16
18	2	(Italy) Edoardo Piscopo	DAMS	2:08.858	+1.771	17
19	3	(Bulgaria) Vladimir Arabadzhiev	Rapax	2:08.863	+1.776	18
20	15	(Czech Republic) Josef Král	Super Nova Racing	2:09.454	+2.367	19
21	25	(United Kingdom) Will Bratt	Scuderia Coloni	2:09.611	+2.524	21
22	6	(Venezuela) Rodolfo González	Barwa Addax Team	2:09.648	+2.561	22
23	14	(United States) Jake Rosenzweig	Super Nova Racing	2:09.904	+2.817	23
24	19	(Bulgaria) Plamen Kralev	Trident Racing	2:12.975	+5.888	24

Notes

- ^1 – Alexander Rossi was given a ten-place grid penalty for causing a forcing Fabio Leimer off the track at the previous round in Bahrain sprint race.

=== Feature race ===
Pos	No	Driver	Team	Laps	Time/Retired	Grid	Points
1	20	(Italy) Luca Filippi	MalaysiaQi-Meritus.com	29	1:06:15.383	1	10+2+1
2	17	(Italy) Davide Valsecchi	iSport International	29	+2.058	4	8
3	11	(France) Charles Pic	Arden International	29	+3.990	2	6
4	24	(Portugal) Álvaro Parente	Scuderia Coloni	29	+6.863	5	5
5	27	(Italy) Giacomo Ricci	DPR	29	+8.085	9	4
6	8	(United Kingdom) Sam Bird	ART Grand Prix	29	+14.845	10	3
7	12	(Spain) Javier Villa	Arden International	29	+15.305	6	2
8	2	(Italy) Edoardo Piscopo	DAMS	29	+15.503	17	1
9	16	(United Kingdom) Oliver Turvey	iSport International	29	+15.684	3	
10	7	(France) Jules Bianchi	ART Grand Prix	29	+18.498	7	
11	21	(United States) Alexander Rossi	MalaysiaQi-Meritus.com	29	+22.028	20	
12	3	(Bulgaria) Vladimir Arabadzhiev	Rapax	29	+22.260	18	
13	22	(Netherlands) Yelmer Buurman	Ocean Racing Technology	29	+26.137	16	
14	18	(Spain) Dani Clos	Trident Racing	29	+26.749	12	
15	25	(United Kingdom) Will Bratt	Scuderia Coloni	29	+28.031	21	
16	15	(Czech Republic) Josef Král	Super Nova Racing	29	+30.208	19	
17	14	(United States) Jake Rosenzweig	Super Nova Racing	29	+31.799	23	
18	26	(Romania) Michael Herck	DPR	29	+48.097	13	
19	5	(United Kingdom) Max Chilton	Barwa Addax Team	28	+1 lap	15	
Ret	1	(Germany) Christian Vietoris	DAMS	21	DNF	14	
Ret	19	(Bulgaria) Plamen Kralev	Trident Racing	20	DNF	24	
Ret	6	(Venezuela) Rodolfo González	Barwa Addax Team	15	DNF	22	
Ret	4	(Brazil) Luiz Razia	Rapax	1	DNF	8	
Ret	23	(Switzerland) Fabio Leimer	Ocean Racing Technology	0	DNF	11	
Fastest lap: Luca Filippi (MalaysiaQi-Meritus.com) 2:09.823 on lap 27

=== Sprint race ===
Pos	No	Driver	Team	Laps	Time/Retired	Grid	Points
1	27	(Italy) Giacomo Ricci	DPR	20	43:47.744	4	6
2	8	(United Kingdom) Sam Bird	ART Grand Prix	20	+5.369	3	5+1
3	24	(Portugal) Álvaro Parente	Scuderia Coloni	20	+9.585	5	4
4	17	(Italy) Davide Valsecchi	iSport International	20	+15.695	7	3
5	21	(United States) Alexander Rossi	MalaysiaQi-Meritus.com	20	+16.559	11	2
6	12	(Spain) Javier Villa	Arden International	20	+23.280	2	1
7	22	(Netherlands) Yelmer Buurman	Ocean Racing Technology	20	+25.403	13	
8	20	(Italy) Luca Filippi	MalaysiaQi-Meritus.com	20	+25.949	8	
9	3	(Bulgaria) Vladimir Arabadzhiev	Rapax	20	+29.077	12	
10	15	(Czech Republic) Josef Král	Super Nova Racing	20	+30.780	16	
11	16	(United Kingdom) Oliver Turvey	iSport International	20	+32.196	9	
12	18	(Spain) Dani Clos	Trident Racing	20	+35.035	14	
13	4	(Brazil) Luiz Razia	Rapax	20	+38.628	23	
14	1	(Germany) Christian Vietoris	DAMS	20	+45.567	20	
15	5	(United Kingdom) Max Chilton	Barwa Addax Team	20	+47.373	19	
16	25	(United Kingdom) Will Bratt	Scuderia Coloni	20	+51.821	15	
17	14	(United States) Jake Rosenzweig	Super Nova Racing	20	+53.057	17	
18	19	(Bulgaria) Plamen Kralev	Trident Racing	20	+1:12.250	21	
19	11	(France) Charles Pic	Arden International	20	+1:44.114	6	
Ret	7	(France) Jules Bianchi	ART Grand Prix	17	DNF	10	
Ret	6	(Venezuela) Rodolfo González	Barwa Addax Team	16	DNF	22	
Ret	26	(Romania) Michael Herck	DPR	16	DNF	18	
DNS	2	(Italy) Edoardo Piscopo	DAMS	0	Did not start^{2}	1	
DNS	23	(Switzerland) Fabio Leimer	Ocean Racing Technology	0	Did not start^{3}	24	
Fastest lap: Jules Bianchi (ART Grand Prix) 2:09.787 on lap 3

Notes

- ^2 – Edoardo Piscopo did not start because she lost her right rear wheel in the formation lap.
- ^3 – Fabio Leimer did not start due to engine problems.

== Standings after the race ==
Drivers' Championship standings

	Pos	Driver	Points
	1	(Italy) Davide Valsecchi	56
2	2	(Italy) Luca Filippi	29
1	3	(Italy) Giacomo Ricci	29
1	4	(Spain) Javier Villa	19
1	5	(France) Charles Pic	18

Teams' Championship standings

	Pos	Team	Points
	1	(United Kingdom) iSport International	73
	2	(Netherlands) Arden International	37
	3	(United Kingdom) DPR	36
	4	(Malaysia) MalaysiaQi-Meritus.com	34
2	5	(France) ART Grand Prix	20

- Note: Only the top five positions are included for both sets of standings.

== Notes ==
Previous round: 2010 Bahrain 1st GP2 Asia round	GP2 Asia Series Championship; 2009–10 season	Next round: 2011 Abu Dhabi GP2 Asia round
Previous round: 2010 Bahrain 1st GP2 Asia round	Bahrain GP2 Asia round	Next round: 2012 Bahrain GP2 Series round
