= 2010 Yas Marina GP2 Asia Series round =

Car racing competition

(United Arab Emirates) 2010 Abu Dhabi GP2 round
Round details
- Round 2 of 4 rounds in the 2010 GP2 Series
- Yas Marina Circuit
- Location: Yas Marina Circuit, Abu Dhabi, United Arab Emirates
- Course: Permanent racing facility 5.554 km (3.451 mi)

GP2 Series

Feature race
- Date: 5 February 2010
- Laps: 33

Pole position
Driver	(France) Charles Pic	Arden International
- Time: 1:52.497

Podium
First	(United Kingdom) Oliver Turvey	iSport International
Second	(Italy) Davide Valsecchi	iSport International
Third	(France) Jules Bianchi	ART Grand Prix

Fastest lap
Driver	(Bulgaria) Vladimir Arabadzhiev (Note: Vladimir Arabadzhiev set the fastest lap, but did not finish in the top 10, so was ineligible to be the point-scorer for the fastest lap. Davide Valsecchi was the point-scorer instead for setting the fastest lap of those finishing in the top 10.)	Rapax
- Time: 1:51.872 (on lap 28)

Sprint race
- Date: 6 February 2010
- Laps: 21

Podium
First	(Italy) Davide Valsecchi	iSport International
Second	(Romania) Michael Herck	DPR
Third	(Italy) Giacomo Ricci	DPR

Fastest lap
Driver	(Italy) Davide Valsecchi	iSport International
- Time: 1.52.061 (on lap 18)

The 2009–10 Abu Dhabi 2nd GP2 Asia round was the second round of the 2009-10 GP2 Asia Series season. It was held on February 5 and 6, 2010 at Yas Marina Circuit at Abu Dhabi, United Arab Emirates. It is the second of two rounds to be held at the circuit, the other being the 2009-10 Abu Dhabi 1st GP2 Asia round. The next race of the season will be at Bahrain International Circuit, Sakhir, Bahrain and will be the first round to be held at the circuit of the season.

== Report ==
=== Feature race ===
Charles Pic started on pole for Race 1. The feature race was won by Oliver Turvey, claiming his first GP2 Asia victory by leading home teammate Davide Valsecchi in an iSport one-two at Yas Marina. Formula 3 Euroseries champion Jules Bianchi began his GP2 career with third for ART, with the charging Luca Filippi coming through to fourth from the back of the grid for Meritus only to retire on the last lap and hand the place to Arden's Javier Villa. Poleman Charles Pic (Arden) had a disastrous race, starting when Turvey burst ahead off the line and Valsecchi surged down the inside to claim second at the end of the long back straight. The top three then settled down in close company, with Bianchi and Villa following them. The latter kickstarted the lead group's early pitstops by coming in for tyres on lap six - and then set a new fastest lap on fresh rubber, prompting the rest of the frontrunners to stop in quick succession. Turvey was the last of this pack to pit on lap 10, emerging right in front of Valsecchi. The championship leader immediately attacked, going around the outside into the Turn 11/12/13 complex and nosing ahead. The two iSport cars banged wheels as they turned in and skittered over the run-off, rejoining still first and second but now with Villa, Bianchi and Pic - who had lost ground on the out-laps - right on their tails. Turvey wasted no time in fighting back, sweeping around the outside of Valsecchi with a brilliant move at the penultimate corner just moments after he had lost the lead. In their wake, Bianchi pulled off an identical pass to take third from Villa.

As the tyres came up to temperature, the frenetic racing calmed down, with Turvey leading Valsecchi, Bianchi, Villa and the flying Filippi. The Meritus driver had made spectacular progress from the back of the grid following his troubled Thursday, but also sent Pic flying across a run-off area and down the order with an aggressive move near half-distance. Although Valsecchi remained on Turvey's tail, the Briton could not be parted from the lead again - even when the safety car was called to retrieve Alberto Valerio's stalled Coloni car in the closing stages. Turvey ultimately beat Valsecchi across the line by 0.6s, with Bianchi close behind and Villa promoted to fourth and DPR's Giacomo Ricci to fifth when Filippi's car ground to a halt with a lap to go. American Alexander Rossi - who also had to start at the back - provided some consolation for Meritus by surging through to sixth. He looked set for eighth and race two pole for a while, until Addax's Giedo van der Garde crashed out of seventh place. That accident handed eighth to Marcus Ericsson, but DPR driver Michael Herck's bid to pass the Super Nova driver left Ericsson with broken suspension, so it was Ocean's Max Chilton who found himself scoring the final point and picking up Saturday pole once Filippi's late retirement elevated the remaining finishers. Christian Vietoris - a winner in the previous event at Yas Marina three months ago - had to retire following a tangle with Trident's Plamen Kralev as he tried to pass the backmarker after his pitstop. Vietoris' DAMS teammate Edoardo Piscopo's race was even shorter as he was involved in one of several opening lap incidents. ART's Sam Bird was the other main lap one casualty, being spun to the back and then having contact with Herck and a solo spin before retiring. Another frontrunner out of luck was Sergio Pérez (Addax), who ran sixth until stalling in the pits and then having to make an additional stop.

=== Sprint race ===
Max Chilton started on Pole for the Sprint Race after finishing 8th in Race 1, and therefore gaining the reverse grid pole. Davide Valsecchi extended his GP2 Asia lead by denying Michael Herck victory with a late pass in the second Abu Dhabi race. Until the closing stages, Herck and his teammate Giacomo Ricci had looked set to give their DPR team a shock one-two - four and a half years after the squad's last wins. But Valsecchi mounted a last gasp charge to pass both Ricci and Herck in quick succession and claim his iSport squad's second win of the weekend. Outside front row starter Herck had taken the lead at the start, with Ricci passing Alexander Rossi (Meritus) for second at a safety car restart shortly afterwards. Valsecchi made rapid progress from seventh on the grid and was soon in third behind the two DPR cars. But until the final half dozen laps, Herck and Ricci looked comfortable up front. The points leader had speed in reserve, though, and in the final laps Valsecchi increased his pace and piled pressure on Ricci, eventually making it through with an inventive move that required several corners to complete. He then hunted down Herck and dived down the inside at the end of the back straight on the penultimate lap, before pulling away to win by 1.9s - giving him a 19-point championship lead at the series' halfway point.

Herck and Ricci held on to the remaining podium places, with Addax's Sergio Pérez charging from the midfield through to fourth. Pérez escaped serious damage in the opening lap tangle that caused the early safety car - the Mexican and Josef Kral touching, and sending the Super Nova car bouncing into Meritus' Luca Filippi. Friday winner Oliver Turvey took the second iSport car to fifth, having spent much of the race behind polesitter Max Chilton (Ocean). The Formula 3 graduate lost ground on lap one but then held his own among the frontrunners and resisted ART's Jules Bianchi - who scorched through the field after stalling on the grid - and Arden's Charles Pic to score the final point. Pic's teammate Javier Villa was another man to stall at the start, while Addax's Giedo van der Garde was making progress through the group behind Chilton until he tangled with Fabio Leimer (Ocean).

== Classification ==
=== Qualifying ===
Pos	No	Driver	Team	Time	Gap	Grid
1	11	(France) Charles Pic	Arden International	1:52.497		1
2	16	(United Kingdom) Oliver Turvey	iSport International	1:52.517	+0.020	2
3	17	(Italy) Davide Valsecchi	iSport International	1:52.603	+0.106	3
4	7	(France) Jules Bianchi	ART Grand Prix	1:52.842	+0.345	4
5	21	(United States) Alexander Rossi	MalaysiaQi-Meritus.com	1:52.861	+0.364	24^{1}
6	12	(Spain) Javier Villa	Arden International	1:52.979	+0.482	5
7	8	(United Kingdom) Sam Bird	ART Grand Prix	1:53.003	+0.506	6
8	2	(Italy) Edoardo Piscopo	DAMS	1:53.086	+0.589	7
9	27	(Italy) Giacomo Ricci	DPR	1:53.134	+0.637	8
10	1	(Germany) Christian Vietoris	DAMS	1:53.183	+0.686	9
11	6	(Mexico) Sergio Pérez	Barwa Addax Team	1:53.407	+0.910	10
12	4	(Italy) Daniel Zampieri	Rapax	1:53.491	+0.994	11
13	5	(Netherlands) Giedo van der Garde	Barwa Addax Team	1:53.509	+1.012	12
14	23	(Switzerland) Fabio Leimer	Ocean Racing Technology	1:53.611	+1.114	13
15	15	(Czech Republic) Josef Král	Super Nova Racing	1:53.685	+1.188	14
16	3	(Bulgaria) Vladimir Arabadzhiev	Rapax	1:53.687	+1.190	15
17	18	(Spain) Dani Clos	Trident Racing	1:53.982	+1.485	16
18	22	(United Kingdom) Max Chilton	Ocean Racing Technology	1:54.036	+1.539	17
19	26	(Romania) Michael Herck	DPR	1:54.074	+1.577	18
20	20	(Italy) Luca Filippi	MalaysiaQi-Meritus.com	1:54.121	+1.624	21^{2}
21	14	(Sweden) Marcus Ericsson	Super Nova Racing	1:54.723	+2.226	19
22	19	(Bulgaria) Plamen Kralev	Trident Racing	1:58.274	+5.777	20
23	25	(United Kingdom) Will Bratt	Scuderia Coloni	2:02.517	+10.020	22
24	24	(Brazil) Alberto Valerio	Scuderia Coloni	No time		23

Notes

- ^1 – Alexander Rossi was disqualified because his car was later found not to be in compliance with the technical regulations.
- ^2 – Luca Filippi received a five grid position penalty for causing a collision with Oliver Turvey during free practice.

=== Feature race ===
Pos	No	Driver	Team	Laps	Time/Retired	Grid	Points
1	16	(United Kingdom) Oliver Turvey	iSport International	33	1:04:55.310	2	10
2	17	(Italy) Davide Valsecchi	iSport International	33	+0.618	3	8+1
3	7	(France) Jules Bianchi	ART Grand Prix	33	+2.589	4	6
4	12	(Spain) Javier Villa	Arden International	33	+7.372	5	5
5	27	(Italy) Giacomo Ricci	DPR	33	+10.559	8	4
6	21	(United States) Alexander Rossi	MalaysiaQi-Meritus.com	33	+13.718	24	3
7	26	(Romania) Michael Herck	DPR	33	+19.800	18	2
8	22	(United Kingdom) Max Chilton	Ocean Racing Technology	33	+24.395	17	1
9	15	(Czech Republic) Josef Král	Super Nova Racing	33	+27.457	14	
10	11	(France) Charles Pic	Arden International	33	+33.726	1	2
11	25	(United Kingdom) Will Bratt	Scuderia Coloni	33	+34.300	22	
12	6	(Mexico) Sergio Pérez	Barwa Addax Team	33	+51.285^{3}	10	
13	3	(Bulgaria) Vladimir Arabadzhiev	Rapax	33	+1:05.390	15	
14	20	(Italy) Luca Filippi	MalaysiaQi-Meritus.com	32	+1 lap	21	
15	24	(Brazil) Alberto Valerio	Scuderia Coloni	32	+1 lap	23	
16	19	(Bulgaria) Plamen Kralev	Trident Racing	32	+1 lap	20	
17	14	(Sweden) Marcus Ericsson	Super Nova Racing	30	+3 laps	19	
Ret	23	(Switzerland) Fabio Leimer	Ocean Racing Technology	27	DNF	13	
Ret	5	(Netherlands) Giedo van der Garde	Barwa Addax Team	25	DNF	12	
Ret	4	(Italy) Daniel Zampieri	Rapax	23	DNF	11	
Ret	18	(Spain) Dani Clos	Trident Racing	9	DNF	16	
Ret	1	(Germany) Christian Vietoris	DAMS	7	DNF	9	
Ret	8	(United Kingdom) Sam Bird	ART Grand Prix	4	DNF	6	
Ret	2	(Italy) Edoardo Piscopo	DAMS	0	DNF	7	

Notes

- ^3 – Sergio Pérez finished ninth but received a 25 second time penalty for of ignoring the waved yellow flags during the brief deployment of the Safety car.

=== Sprint race ===
Pos	No	Driver	Team	Laps	Time/Retired	Grid	Points
1	17	(Italy) Davide Valsecchi	iSport International	21	41:00.566	7	6+1
2	26	(Romania) Michael Herck	DPR	21	+1.969	2	5
3	27	(Italy) Giacomo Ricci	DPR	21	+4.227	4	4
4	6	(Mexico) Sergio Pérez	Barwa Addax Team	21	+11.618	12	3
5	16	(United Kingdom) Oliver Turvey	iSport International	21	+12.235	8	2
6	22	(United Kingdom) Max Chilton	Ocean Racing Technology	21	+19.619	1	1
7	7	(France) Jules Bianchi	ART Grand Prix	21	+20.018	6	
8	11	(France) Charles Pic	Arden International	21	+20.686	10	
9	21	(United States) Alexander Rossi	MalaysiaQi-Meritus.com	21	+26.380	3	
10	3	(Bulgaria) Vladimir Arabadzhiev	Rapax	21	+27.038	13	
11	12	(Spain) Javier Villa	Arden International	21	+27.400	5	
12	14	(Sweden) Marcus Ericsson	Super Nova Racing	21	+28.307	17	
13	18	(Spain) Dani Clos	Trident Racing	21	+29.574	21	
14	1	(Germany) Christian Vietoris	DAMS	21	+30.993	22	
15	4	(Italy) Daniel Zampieri	Rapax	21	+31.691	20	
16	2	(Italy) Edoardo Piscopo	DAMS	21	+32.213	24	
17	20	(Italy) Luca Filippi	MalaysiaQi-Meritus.com	21	+34.854	14	
18	24	(Brazil) Alberto Valerio	Scuderia Coloni	21	+39.649	15	
19	5	(Netherlands) Giedo van der Garde	Barwa Addax Team	21	+1:03.697	19	
20	19	(Bulgaria) Plamen Kralev	Trident Racing	21	+1:07.219	16	
21	25	(United Kingdom) Will Bratt	Scuderia Coloni	18	+3 laps	11	
Ret	23	(Switzerland) Fabio Leimer	Ocean Racing Technology	16	DNF	18	
Ret	15	(Czech Republic) Josef Král	Super Nova Racing	0	DNF	9	
Ret	8	(United Kingdom) Sam Bird	ART Grand Prix	0	DNF	23	

== Standings after the race ==
Drivers' Championship standings

	Pos	Driver	Points
	1	(Italy) Davide Valsecchi	35
5	2	(United Kingdom) Oliver Turvey	16
2	3	(United States) Alexander Rossi	10
2	4	(Germany) Christian Vietoris	9
2	5	(Italy) Luca Filippi	8

Teams' Championship standings

	Pos	Team	Points
	1	(United Kingdom) iSport International	51
5	2	(United Kingdom) DPR	15
1	3	(United Kingdom) Super Nova Racing	14
	4	(Malaysia) MalaysiaQi-Meritus.com	11
2	5	(France) DAMS	9

- Note: Only the top five positions are included for both sets of standings.

== Notes ==
Previous round: 2009 Yas Marina GP2 Asia Series round	GP2 Asia Series Championship; 2009–10 season	Next round: 2010 Bahrain 1st GP2 Asia round
Previous round: 2009 Yas Marina GP2 Asia Series round	Abu Dhabi GP2 Asia round	Next round: 2010 Yas Marina GP2 Series round
