= 2012 Spa-Francorchamps GP2 Series round =

(Belgium) 2012 Spa-Francorchamps GP2 round
Round details
- Round 10 of 12 rounds in the 2012 GP2 Series
- Layout of the Circuit de Spa-Francorchamps
- Location: Circuit de Spa-Francorchamps, Francorchamps, Wallonia, Belgium
- Course: Permanent racing facility 7.004 km (4.352 mi)

GP2 Series

Feature race
- Date: 1 September 2012
- Laps: 25

Pole position
Driver	(Indonesia) Rio Haryanto	Carlin
- Time: 2:17.535

Podium
First	(Sweden) Marcus Ericsson	iSport International
Second	(United Kingdom) James Calado	Lotus GP
Third	(Italy) Davide Valsecchi	DAMS

Fastest lap
Driver	(Mexico) Esteban Gutiérrez	Lotus GP
- Time: 2:00.083 (on lap 12)

Sprint race
- Date: 2 September 2012
- Laps: 18

Podium
First	(Czech Republic) Josef Král	Barwa Addax Team
Second	(Brazil) Felipe Nasr	DAMS
Third	(United Kingdom) James Calado	Lotus GP

Fastest lap
Driver	(United Kingdom) Max Chilton	Carlin
- Time: 1:59.201 (on lap 15)

The 2012 Spa-Francorchamps GP2 Series round was a GP2 Series motor race held on September 1 and 2, 2012 at Circuit de Spa-Francorchamps, Belgium. It was the tenth round of the 2012 GP2 Series. The race supported the 2012 Belgian Grand Prix.

== Classification ==
=== Qualifying ===
Pos.	No.	Driver	Team	Time	Grid
1	27	(Indonesia) Rio Haryanto	Carlin	2:17.535	1
2	9	(United Kingdom) James Calado	Lotus GP	2:17.643	2
3	10	(Mexico) Esteban Gutiérrez	Lotus GP	2:17.736	3
4	7	(Sweden) Marcus Ericsson	iSport International	2:18.058	4
5	8	(United Kingdom) Jolyon Palmer	iSport International	2:18.368	5
6	3	(Italy) Davide Valsecchi	DAMS	2:18.397	6
7	18	(Spain) Sergio Canamasas	Venezuela GP Lazarus	2:18.582	7
8	5	(Switzerland) Fabio Leimer	Racing Engineering	2:18.603	8
9	4	(Brazil) Felipe Nasr	DAMS	2:18.801	9
10	12	(Netherlands) Giedo van der Garde	Caterham Racing	2:18.930	10
11	14	(Monaco) Stefano Coletti	Scuderia Coloni	2:19.328	11
12	6	(France) Nathanaël Berthon	Racing Engineering	2:19.721	12
13	26	(United Kingdom) Max Chilton	Carlin Motorsport	2:19.803	13
14	15	(Italy) Fabio Onidi	Scuderia Coloni	2:20.100	14
15	2	(Czech Republic) Josef Král	Barwa Addax Team	2:20.224	15
16	24	(Brazil) Victor Guerin	Ocean Racing Technology	2:20.289	16
17	17	(Colombia) Julián Leal	Trident Racing	2:20.455	17
18	20	(Portugal) Ricardo Teixeira	Rapax	2:20.484	18
19	23	(Brazil) Luiz Razia	Arden International	2:20.712	19
20	11	(Venezuela) Rodolfo González	Caterham Racing	2:20.752	20
21	25	(Netherlands) Nigel Melker	Ocean Racing Technology	2:20.888	21
22	21	(Netherlands) Daniël de Jong	Rapax	2:20.921	22
23	16	(Monaco) Stéphane Richelmi	Trident Racing	2:21.070	23
24	22	(Switzerland) Simon Trummer	Arden International	2:21.790	24
25	1	(Venezuela) Johnny Cecotto Jr.	Barwa Addax Team	2:21.942	25
26	19	(Austria) René Binder	Venezuela GP Lazarus	2:22.795	26

=== Feature race ===
Pos.	No.	Driver	Team	Laps	Time/Retired	Grid	Points
1	7	(Sweden) Marcus Ericsson	iSport International	25	1:55:36.519	4	25
2	9	(United Kingdom) James Calado	Lotus GP	25	+11.530	2	18
3	3	(Italy) Davide Valsecchi	DAMS	25	+13.634	6	15
4	2	(Czech Republic) Josef Král	Barwa Addax Team	25	+15.098	15	12
5	12	(Netherlands) Giedo van der Garde	Caterham Racing	25	+15.482	10	12 (10+2)
6	23	(Brazil) Luiz Razia	Arden International	25	+16.803	19	8
7	17	(Colombia) Julián Leal	Trident Racing	25	+26.615	17	6
8	4	(Brazil) Felipe Nasr	DAMS	25	+28.803	9	4
9	16	(Monaco) Stéphane Richelmi	Trident Racing	25	+29.130	23	2
10	27	(Indonesia) Rio Haryanto	Carlin	25	+29.468	1	5 (1+4)
11	10	(Mexico) Esteban Gutiérrez	Lotus GP	25	+30.182	3	
12	26	(United Kingdom) Max Chilton	Carlin	25	+31.160	13	
13	21	(Netherlands) Daniël de Jong	Rapax	25	+37.340	22	
14	6	(France) Nathanaël Berthon	Racing Engineering	25	+39.130	12	
15	22	(Switzerland) Simon Trummer	Arden International	25	+49.936	24	
16	15	(Italy) Fabio Onidi	Scuderia Coloni	25	+54.918	14	
17	1	(Venezuela) Johnny Cecotto Jr.	Barwa Addax Team	25	+58.788	25	
18	20	(Portugal) Ricardo Teixeira	Rapax	25	+1:25.639	17	
19	19	(Austria) René Binder	Venezuela GP Lazarus	24	+1 Lap	26	
20	14	(Monaco) Stefano Coletti	Scuderia Coloni	22	Collision	11	
Ret	24	(Brazil) Victor Guerin	Ocean Racing Technology	21	Collision	19	
Ret	8	(United Kingdom) Jolyon Palmer	iSport International	18	Accident	5	
Ret	18	(Spain) Sergio Canamasas	Venezuela GP Lazarus	11	Accident	7	
Ret	25	(Netherlands) Nigel Melker	Ocean Racing Technology	2	Accident	21	
Ret	5	(Switzerland) Fabio Leimer	Racing Engineering	0	Spun off	8	
Ret	11	(Venezuela) Rodolfo González	Caterham Racing	0	Accident	20	
Fastest lap: Esteban Gutiérrez (Lotus GP) — 2:00.083 (on lap 12)

=== Sprint race ===
Pos.	No.	Driver	Team	Laps	Time/Retired	Grid	Points
1	2	(Czech Republic) Josef Král	Barwa Addax Team	18	36:59.474	5	15
2	4	(Brazil) Felipe Nasr	DAMS	18	+5.109	1	12
3	9	(United Kingdom) James Calado	Lotus GP	18	+5.290	7	10
4	7	(Sweden) Marcus Ericsson	iSport International	18	+6.335	8	8
5	5	(Switzerland) Fabio Leimer	Racing Engineering	18	+11.041	25	6
6	16	(Monaco) Stéphane Richelmi	Trident Racing	18	+24.694	9	4
7	27	(Indonesia) Rio Haryanto	Carlin	18	+25.237	10	2
8	14	(Monaco) Stefano Coletti	Scuderia Coloni	18	+25.957	20	3 (1+2)
9	17	(Colombia) Julián Leal	Trident Racing	18	+26.257	2	
10	8	(United Kingdom) Jolyon Palmer	iSport International	18	+27.441	22	
11	21	(Netherlands) Daniël de Jong	Rapax	18	+32.681	13	
12	15	(Italy) Fabio Onidi	Scuderia Coloni	18	+35.830	16	
13	10	(Mexico) Esteban Gutiérrez	Lotus GP	18	+35.928	11	
14	11	(Venezuela) Rodolfo González	Caterham Racing	18	+37.222	26	
15	20	(Portugal) Ricardo Teixeira	Rapax	18	+37.867	18	
16	22	(Switzerland) Simon Trummer	Arden International	18	+38.387	15	
17	19	(Austria) René Binder	Venezuela GP Lazarus	18	+41.470	19	
18	24	(Brazil) Victor Guerin	Ocean Racing Technology	18	+47.175	21	
19	6	(France) Nathanaël Berthon	Racing Engineering	18	+52.735	14	
20	23	(Brazil) Luiz Razia	Arden International	18	+56.434	3	
21	12	(Netherlands) Giedo van der Garde	Caterham Racing	18	+1:19.121	4	
22	26	(United Kingdom) Max Chilton	Carlin	18	+1:22.927	12	
Ret	3	(Italy) Davide Valsecchi	DAMS	9	Suspension	6	
Ret	18	(Spain) Sergio Canamasas	Venezuela GP Lazarus	9	Spun off	23	
Ret	1	(Venezuela) Johnny Cecotto Jr.	Barwa Addax Team	0	Collision	17	
DNS	25	(Netherlands) Nigel Melker	Ocean Racing Technology	0	did not start	—	
Fastest lap: Max Chilton (Carlin) — 1:59.201 (on lap 15)

== Standings after the round ==
Drivers' Championship standings

	Pos	Driver	Points
	1	(Brazil) Luiz Razia	204
	2	(Italy) Davide Valsecchi	204
1	3	(United Kingdom) James Calado	160
1	4	(Mexico) Esteban Gutiérrez	150
	5	(Netherlands) Giedo van der Garde	141

Teams' Championship standings

Pos	Team	Points
1	(France) Lotus GP	310
2	(France) DAMS	289
3	(United Kingdom) Arden International	208
4	(Spain) Racing Engineering	162
5	(United Kingdom) Carlin	160

- Note: Only the top five positions are included for both sets of standings.

== See also ==
- 2012 Belgian Grand Prix
- 2012 Spa-Francorchamps GP3 Series round

Previous round: 2012 Hungaroring GP2 round	GP2 Series; 2012 season	Next round: 2012 Monza GP2 round
Previous round: 2011 Spa-Francorchamps GP2 round	GP2 Spa-Francorchamps round	Next round: 2013 Spa-Francorchamps GP2 round
