= Team Lazarus =

Italian racing team

(Italy) Lazarus
- Founded: 2009
- Base: Caselle di Selvazzano, Padua, Italy
- Team principal(s): Tancredi Pagiaro
- Current series: Italian GT Championship
- Former series: Lamborghini Super Trofeo Asia; GP2 Series; Auto GP; Euroseries 3000; International GT Open; Blancpain GT Series
- Current drivers: (Finland) William Alatalo (Italy) Mattia di Giusto (India) Mahaveer Raghunathan (Spain) Jorge Lorenzo
- Website: http://www.teamlazarus.it/

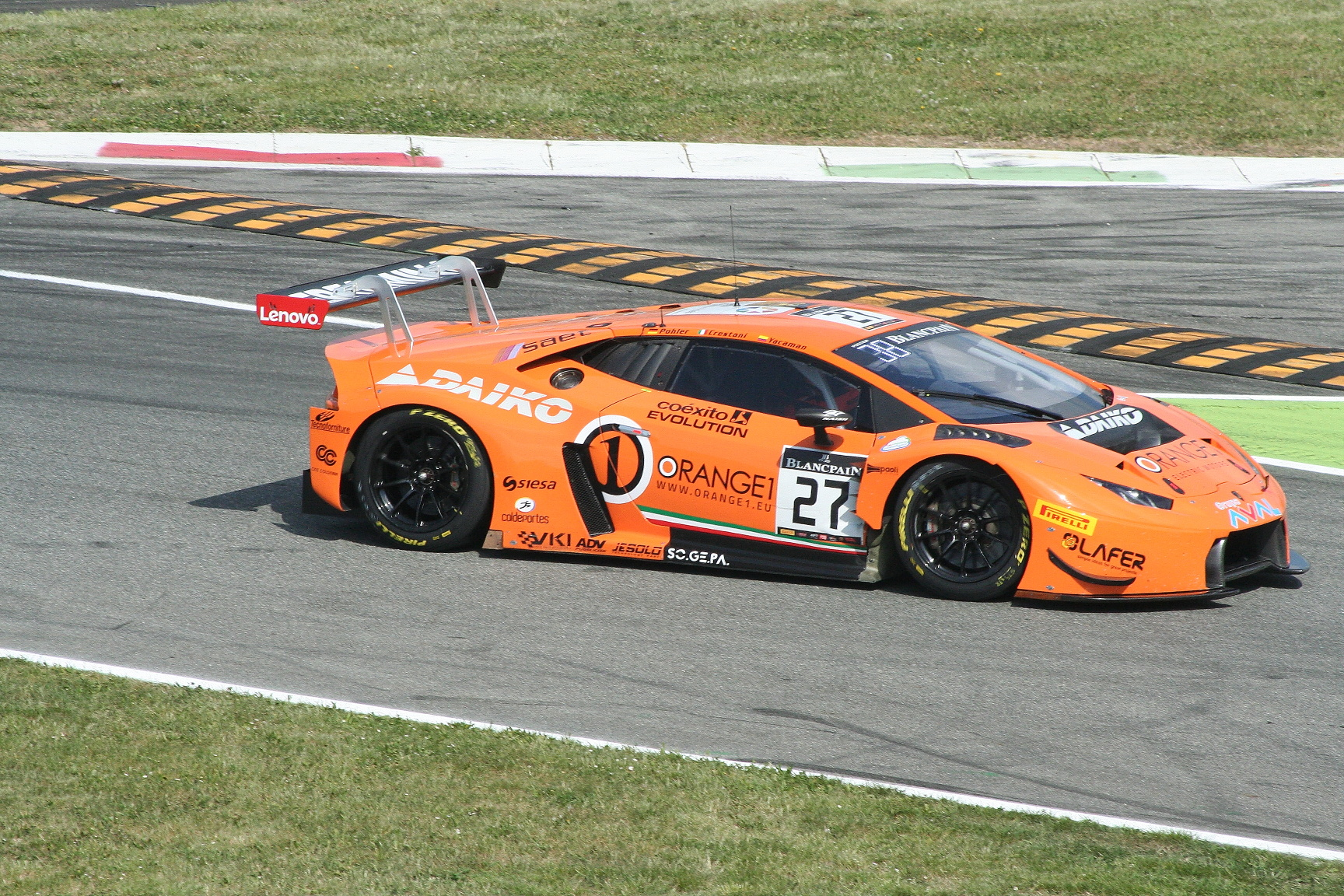
Orange 1 Team Lazarus Lamborghini Huracán GT3 at the Monza.

Team Lazarus, currently competing as L&A Infinity Racing, is an Italian auto racing team, based in Padova, which is currently competing in the International GT Open and Blancpain GT Endurance Series formerly starting in GP2 Series and Auto GP.

== Background ==
Team Lazarus were founded in 2009 by Tancredi Pagiaro, who also founded the GP Racing team in 1997.

The team took part in three rounds of the 2009 Euroseries 3000 season, debuting at the season-opener in Portimão with GP2 Series drivers Michael Herck and Diego Nunes, who were racing in order to learn the circuit ahead of the GP2 Series visit there later in the year. The team scored eleven points over the course of the weekend with Nunes and Herck finishing fourth and fifth respectively in the Saturday feature race.

At the next round in Magny-Cours, the team were down to a single car entry with Italian Formula Three graduate Michael Dalle Stelle taking over the driving duties. He remained with the team for the following round at Zolder, but failed to start either race during the event. The team then missed the final three events of the season in Valencia, Vallelunga and Monza. They finished the season in seventh place in the Teams' standings with twelve points.

In 2010, Team Lazarus have entered the new Auto GP series with a single car for Italian Fabio Onidi. The new partnership delivered a podium finish in the opening race of the season at Brno, with Onidi finishing third behind Edoardo Piscopo and race winner Luca Filippi.

In February 2012, it was announced that Lazarus would be joining the GP2 Series under the name "Venezuela GP Lazarus", replacing Super Nova Racing.

In 2017 Team Lazarus participated in two Championships: the Blancpain GT Series, with an orange Lamborghini Huracán with GT3 configuration, and a black Huracán with a layout for the Lamborghini Super Trofeo Asia Championship.

In 2018 Team Lazarus is starting in the Blancpain GT Endurance Series as well as in the International GT Open Championship.

Lazarus Corse became an AMR Partner team in 2023. The team signed three-time MotoGP champion Jorge Lorenzo on a multi-year deal in 2024.

== Results ==
=== GP2 Series ===
Year	Car	Drivers	Races	Wins	Poles	F.L.	Points	D.C.	T.C.
2012	Dallara GP2/11-Mecachrome	(Italy) Fabrizio Crestani	14	0	0	0	1	24th	12th
2012	Dallara GP2/11-Mecachrome	(Spain) Sergio Canamasas	10	0	0	0	0	27th	12th
2012	Dallara GP2/11-Mecachrome	(Austria) René Binder	6	0	0	0	0	31st	12th
2012	Dallara GP2/11-Mecachrome	(Venezuela) Giancarlo Serenelli	18	0	0	0	0	33rd	12th
2013	Dallara GP2/11-Mecachrome	(Austria) René Binder	22	0	0	0	11	23rd	13th
2013	Dallara GP2/11-Mecachrome	(Italy) Kevin Giovesi	8	0	0	0	0	29th	13th
2013	Dallara GP2/11-Mecachrome	(Italy) Fabrizio Crestani	4	0	0	0	0	33rd	13th
2013	Dallara GP2/11-Mecachrome	(Italy) Vittorio Ghirelli	10	0	0	0	1	27th	13th
2014	Dallara GP2/11-Mecachrome	(France) Nathanaël Berthon	22	0	0	0	17	20th	13th
2014	Dallara GP2/11-Mecachrome	(United States) Conor Daly	18	0	0	0	2	26th	13th
2014	Dallara GP2/11-Mecachrome	(Italy) Sergio Campana	4	0	0	0	0	30th	13th
2015	Dallara GP2/11-Mecachrome	(France) Nathanaël Berthon	19	0	0	0	27	16th	10th
2015	Dallara GP2/11-Mecachrome	(Switzerland) Patric Niederhauser	2	0	0	0	0	34th	10th
2015	Dallara GP2/11-Mecachrome	(Switzerland) Zoël Amberg	6	0	0	0	0	29th	10th
2015	Dallara GP2/11-Mecachrome	(Spain) Sergio Canamasas	2	0	0	0	27	15th	10th

† Lazarus competed under the name Venezuela GP Lazarus from 2012 to 2014.

=== In detail ===
==== GP2 Series ====
(key) (Races in bold indicate pole position) (Races in italics indicate fastest lap)

Year	Chassis Engine Tyres	Drivers	1	2	3	4	5	6	7	8	9	10	11	12	13	14	15	16	17	18	19	20	21	22	23	24	T.C.	Points
2012	GP2/11; Mecachrome; **P**		SEP; FEA	SEP; SPR	BHR1; FEA	BHR1; SPR	BHR2; FEA	BHR2; SPR	CAT; FEA	CAT; SPR	MON; FEA	MON; SPR	VAL; FEA	VAL; SPR	SIL; FEA	SIL; SPR	HOC; FEA	HOC; SPR	HUN; FEA	HUN; SPR	SPA; FEA	SPA; SPR	MNZ; FEA	MNZ; SPR	MRN; FEA	MRN; SPR	12th	1
2012	GP2/11; Mecachrome; **P**	(Italy) Fabrizio Crestani	10	21	14	19	Ret	23	17	10	19	Ret	Ret	DNS	11	22†											12th	1
2012	GP2/11; Mecachrome; **P**	(Spain) Sergio Canamasas															22	14	22	12	Ret	Ret	14	11	16	DSQ	12th	1
2012	GP2/11; Mecachrome; **P**	(Venezuela) Giancarlo Serenelli	23	20	18	21	22	21	25	Ret	22	Ret	Ret	16	19	16	24	Ret	20	22							12th	1
2012	GP2/11; Mecachrome; **P**	(Austria) René Binder																			19	17	17	13	Ret	Ret	12th	1
2013	GP2/11; Mecachrome; **P**		SEP; FEA	SEP; SPR	BHR; FEA	BHR; SPR	CAT; FEA	CAT; SPR	MON; FEA	MON; SPR	SIL; FEA	SIL; SPR	NÜR; FEA	NÜR; SPR	HUN; FEA	HUN; SPR	SPA; FEA	SPA; SPR	MNZ; FEA	MNZ; SPR	MRN; FEA	MRN; SPR	YMC; FEA	YMC; SPR			13th	12
2013	GP2/11; Mecachrome; **P**	(Austria) René Binder	11	8	18	25	20	19	7	6	16	13	20	10	22	13	DNS	20	16	14	18	9	15	16			13th	12
2013	GP2/11; Mecachrome; **P**	(Italy) Kevin Giovesi	16	10	Ret	17	Ret	17	Ret	20																	13th	12
2013	GP2/11; Mecachrome; **P**	(Italy) Fabrizio Crestani									18	17	19	21													13th	12
2013	GP2/11; Mecachrome; **P**	(Italy) Vittorio Ghirelli													17	17	18	18	10	20	Ret	19	Ret	19			13th	12
2014	GP2/11; Mecachrome; **P**		BHR; FEA	BHR; SPR	CAT; FEA	CAT; SPR	MON; FEA	MON; SPR	RBR; FEA	RBR; SPR	SIL; FEA	SIL; SPR	HOC; FEA	HOC; SPR	HUN; FEA	HUN; SPR	SPA; FEA	SPA; SPR	MNZ; FEA	MNZ; SPR	SOC; FEA	SOC; SPR	YMC; FEA	YMC; SPR			13th	19
2014	GP2/11; Mecachrome; **P**	(France) Nathanaël Berthon	23†	17	Ret	Ret	17	12	22	25	17	12	8	17	8	4	22	15	13	19†	10	9	15	13			13th	19
2014	GP2/11; Mecachrome; **P**	(United States) Conor Daly	12	Ret	18	Ret	13	10	18	11	14	10	21	20	13	7	Ret	19					20	15			13th	19
2014	GP2/11; Mecachrome; **P**	(Italy) Sergio Campana																	15	Ret	DNS	20					13th	19
2015	GP2/11; Mecachrome; **P**		BHR; FEA	BHR; SPR	CAT; FEA	CAT; SPR	MON; FEA	MON; SPR	RBR; FEA	RBR; SPR	SIL; FEA	SIL; SPR	HUN; FEA	HUN; SPR	SPA; FEA	SPA; SPR	MNZ; FEA	MNZ; SPR	SOC; FEA	SOC; SPR	BHR; FEA	BHR; SPR	YMC; FEA	YMC; SPR			10th	31
2015	GP2/11; Mecachrome; **P**	(France) Nathanaël Berthon	7	3	20	12	17	15	Ret	17	Ret	21	14	11	7	7			14	19	11	Ret	10	C			10th	31
2015	GP2/11; Mecachrome; **P**	(Switzerland) Patric Niederhauser															17	17									10th	31
2015	GP2/11; Mecachrome; **P**	(Switzerland) Zoël Amberg	16	18	17	13	22	Ret	DNS	DNS			DNS	DNS													10th	31
2015	GP2/11; Mecachrome; **P**	(Spain) Sergio Canamasas									15	24			12	9	11	6	Ret	17	12	17	12	C			10th	31
