= Sergio Canamasas =

Spanish racing driver

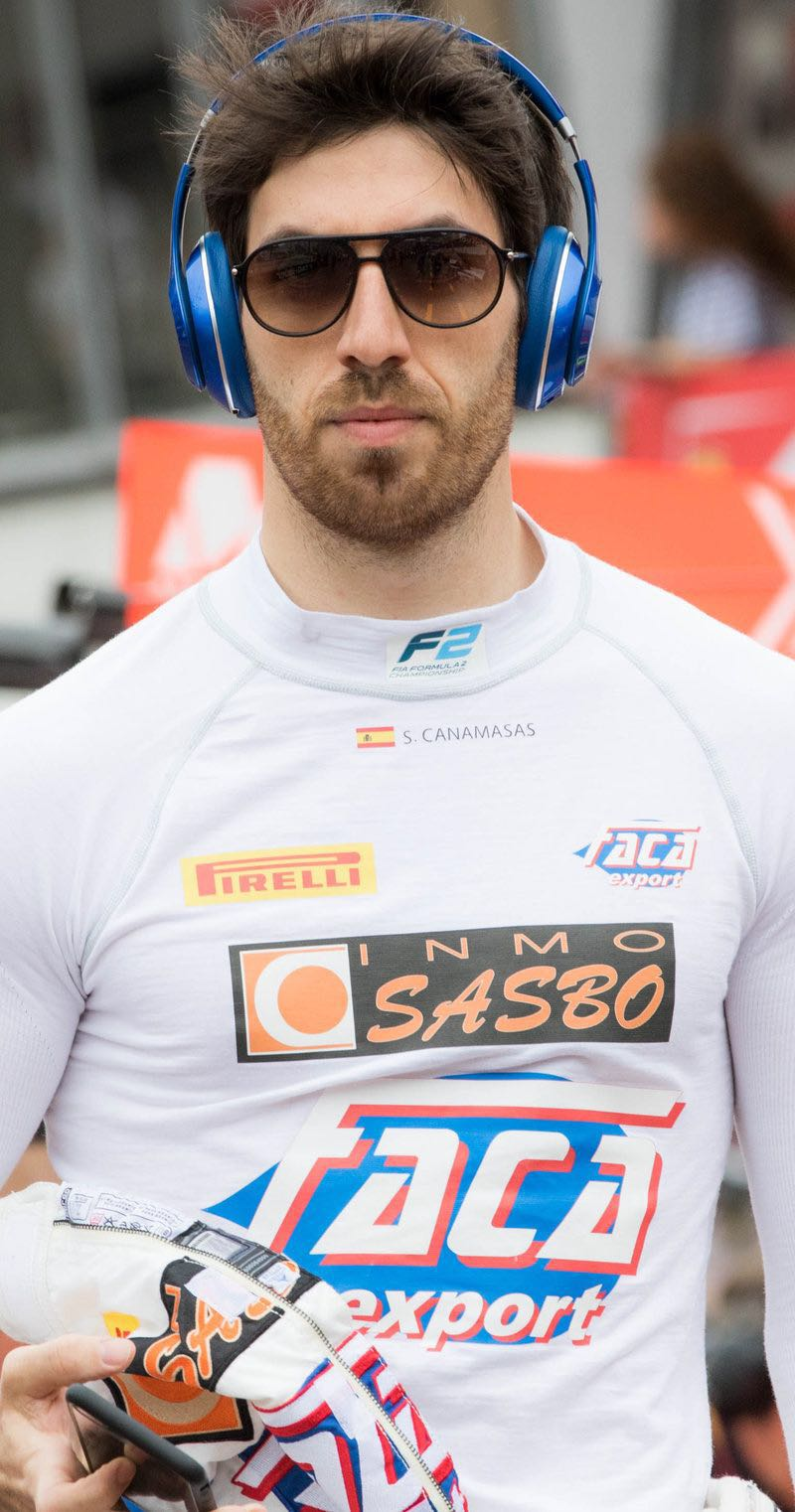
- Sergio Canamasas in 2017 at FIA F2
- Nationality: (Spain) Spanish
- Full name: Sergio Canamasas Español
- Born: 30 April 1986 (age 40) Barcelona, Spain

FIA Formula 2 Championship career
- Debut season: 2017
- Current team: Rapax
- Car number: 19
- Former teams: Trident
- Starts: 14
- Wins: 0
- Poles: 0
- Fastest laps: 0
- Best finish: 14th in 2017

Previous series
- 2012-2016 2010–11 2009 2007–08: GP2 Series; Formula Renault 3.5 Series; European F3 Open; Spanish Formula Three

Sergio Canamasas Español (Note: In this Spanish name, the first or paternal surname is Canamasas and the second or maternal family name is Español.) (born 30 April 1986) is a Spanish former racing driver.

== Career ==
Canamasas began racing kart racing in 2000 and in 2005 he won the Inter-A Championship.

=== Formula Three ===
Canamasas made his Formula racing debut in 2007, racing in the Spanish Formula Three Championship for the Cetea Sport team. He took part in the final eight races of the season and was entered into the secondary Copa de España class for the older Dallara F300 chassis. He took a single class podium in the final round in Barcelona to finish eighth in the standings. The following season, Canamasas moved up to the main class with the team, but failed to score a point in the fourteen races he contested.

For 2009, Canamasas continued in the series when it became known as the European F3 Open Championship, moving to the Emiliodevillota.com team. He finished the season in sixth place overall after taking podium places at Jarama, Jerez and Barcelona.

=== Formula Renault 3.5 Series ===
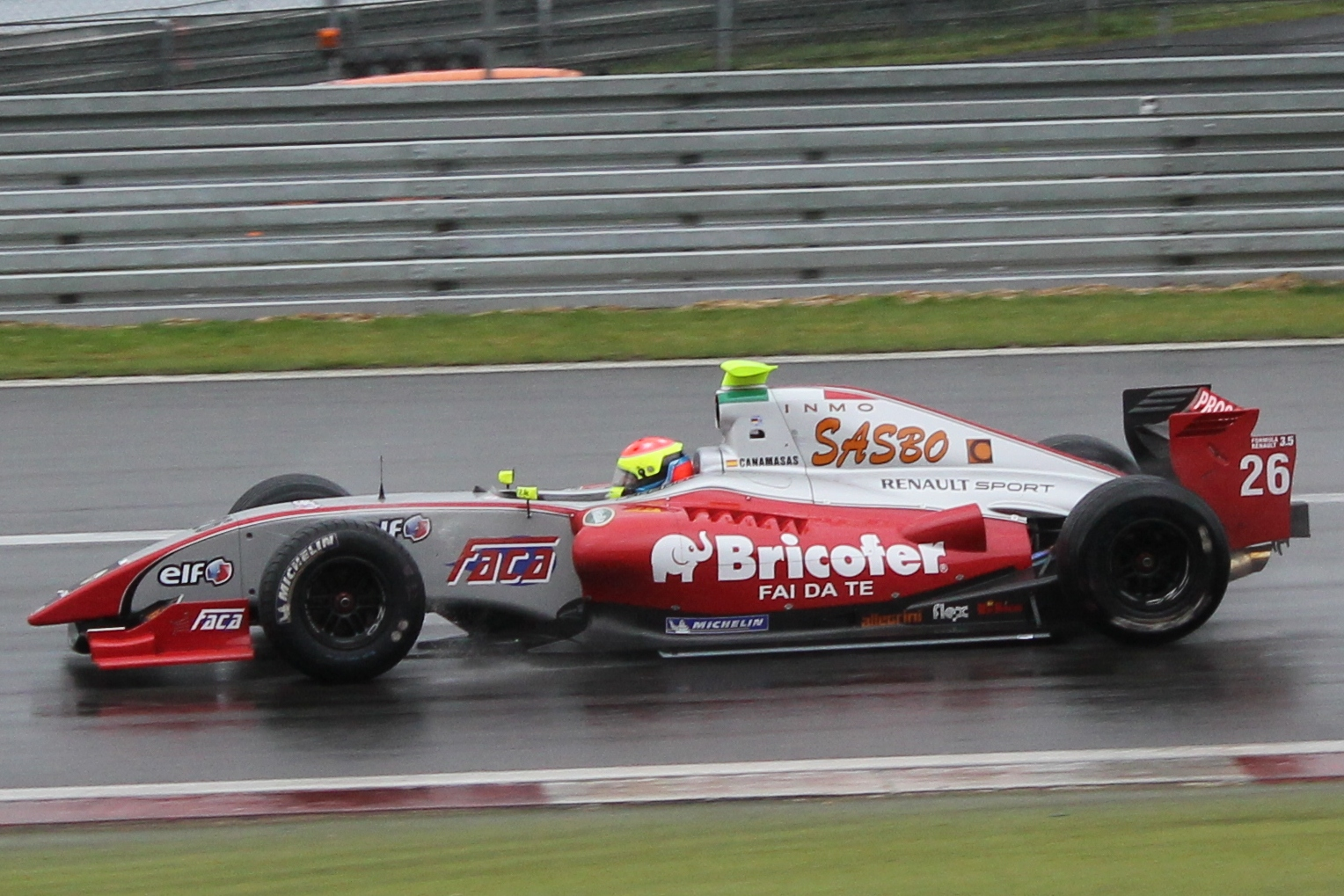
Sergio Canamasas at the 2011 Nürburgring World series by Renault round.

In March 2010, Canamasas took part in all three Formula Renault 3.5 Series pre-season tests at Barcelona, Jerez and Motorland Aragón, driving for Fortec Motorsport, ISR Racing and SG Formula. A week before the start of the season, he was confirmed at the new FHV Interwetten.com team, racing alongside 2009 European F3 Open champion Bruno Méndez. He failed to score a point in the 16 races he competed in, the only full-time driver who failed to do so. His best race result was a 14th-place finish in the second Magny–Cours race.

After testing for various teams during the off-season, Canamasas drove for new team BVM-Target in the 2011 season, racing alongside fellow second-year driver Daniel Zampieri. He finished eighth in the drivers' championship with a best finish of third at the Hungaroring, and also taking a pole position for the second race at the circuit.

=== GP2 Series ===
Canamasas began 2012 without a drive, but was signed by the Lazarus team to compete in the eighth round of the GP2 Series, alongside Giancarlo Serenelli and replacing Fabrizio Crestani. He did not score any points from the ten races in which he competed. In 2014, Canamasas switched to Trident and took his first podium in GP2 by finishing third in the sprint race at Monaco. Canamasas was disqualified from the sprint race in Monza for reckless driving that resulted in the retirements of numerous drivers, including his teammate Johnny Cecotto Jr.

=== Formula 2 ===
Canamasas returned to Trident for the 2017 Formula 2 season. He switched to Rapax before the Spielberg round. After the Budapest round, Canamasas left the series. He explained his decision to step away by citing a lack of professionalism on the part of the circuit's medical staff in an incident that almost cost his father his life.

== Racing record ==
=== Career summary ===
Season	Series	Team	Races	Wins	Poles	F/Laps	Podiums	Points	Position
2007	Spanish Formula 3 Championship – Copa de España	Cetea Sport	8	0	0	?	1	9	8th
2008	Spanish Formula 3 Championship	Cetea Sport	14	0	0	0	0	0	29th
2009	European F3 Open Championship	emiliodevillota.com	16	0	0	1	3	54	6th
2010	Formula Renault 3.5 Series	FHV Interwetten.com	16	0	0	0	0	0	25th
2011	Formula Renault 3.5 Series	BVM–Target	17	0	1	2	1	69	8th
2012	GP2 Series	Venezuela GP Lazarus	10	0	0	0	0	0	27th
2013	GP2 Series	EQ8 Caterham Racing	22	0	0	0	0	3	25th
2013	Formula One	Caterham F1 Team	Test driver						
2014	GP2 Series	Trident	19	0	0	0	1	29	14th
2015	GP2 Series	MP Motorsport	6	0	0	0	1	27	15th
2015	GP2 Series	Daiko Team Lazarus	11	0	0	0	0	27	15th
2015	GP2 Series	Hilmer Motorsport	2	0	0	0	0	27	15th
2016	GP2 Series	Carlin	20	0	0	0	0	17	19th
2017	FIA Formula 2 Championship	Trident	8	0	0	0	0	21	14th
2017	FIA Formula 2 Championship	Rapax	6	0	0	0	0	21	14th

=== Complete Formula Renault 3.5 Series results ===
(key) (Races in bold indicate pole position) (Races in italics indicate fastest lap)

Year	Team	1	2	3	4	5	6	7	8	9	10	11	12	13	14	15	16	17	Pos	Points
2010	FHV Interwetten.com	ALC; 1 Ret	ALC; 2; 16	SPA; 1 DNS	SPA; 2 Ret	MON; 1; 19	BRN; 1; 17	BRN; 2; 17	MAG; 1; 17	MAG; 2; 14	HUN; 1 Ret	HUN; 2; 20	HOC; 1; 15	HOC; 2 Ret	SIL; 1 Ret	SIL; 2 Ret	CAT; 1; 17	CAT; 2; 17	25th	0
2011	BVM–Target	ALC; 1; 22	ALC; 2; 10	SPA; 1; 9	SPA; 2 Ret	MNZ; 1 Ret	MNZ; 2; 8	MON; 1; 21^{†}	NÜR; 1; 9	NÜR; 2; 11	HUN; 1; 3	**HUN**; **2**; 4	SIL; 1; 10	SIL; 2; 19	LEC; 1; 5	LEC; 2; 17	CAT; 1; 5	CAT; 2; 4	8th	69

^{†} Driver did not finish the race, but was classified as he completed more than 90% of the race distance.

=== Complete GP2 Series/FIA Formula 2 Championship results ===
(key) (Races in bold indicate pole position) (Races in italics indicate fastest lap)

Year	Entrant	1	2	3	4	5	6	7	8	9	10	11	12	13	14	15	16	17	18	19	20	21	22	23	24	DC	Points
2012	Venezuela GP Lazarus	SEP; FEA	SEP; SPR	BHR1; FEA	BHR1; SPR	BHR2; FEA	BHR2; SPR	CAT; FEA	CAT; SPR	MON; FEA	MON; SPR	VAL; FEA	VAL; SPR	SIL; FEA	SIL; SPR	HOC; FEA; 22	HOC; SPR; 14	HUN; FEA; 22	HUN; SPR; 12	SPA; FEA; Ret	SPA; SPR; Ret	MNZ; FEA; 14	MNZ; SPR; 11	MRN; FEA; 16	MRN; SPR; DSQ	27th	0
2013	EQ8 Caterham Racing	SEP; FEA; 19	SEP; SPR; 15	BHR; FEA; 20	BHR; SPR; 11	CAT; FEA; Ret	CAT; SPR; 14	MON; FEA; 15	MON; SPR; 11	SIL; FEA; 23	SIL; SPR; 20	NÜR; FEA; 12	NÜR; SPR; 17	HUN; FEA; Ret	HUN; SPR; Ret	SPA; FEA; Ret	SPA; SPR; 12	MNZ; FEA; 9	MNZ; SPR; 11	MRN; FEA; 19	MRN; SPR; Ret	YMC; FEA; 12	YMC; SPR; 8			25th	3
2014	Trident	BHR; FEA	BHR; SPR	CAT; FEA; 17	CAT; SPR; 18	MON; FEA; 5	MON; SPR; 2	RBR; FEA; 15	RBR; SPR; 9	SIL; FEA; 15	SIL; SPR; Ret	HOC; FEA; 15	HOC; SPR; 13	HUN; FEA; Ret	HUN; SPR; DNS	SPA; FEA; 20	SPA; SPR; Ret	MNZ; FEA; 18	MNZ; SPR; DSQ	SOC; FEA; 7	SOC; SPR; Ret	YMC; FEA; 16	YMC; SPR; 8			14th	29
2015	MP Motorsport	BHR; FEA; 14	BHR; SPR; Ret	CAT; FEA; 13	CAT; SPR; 15	MON; FEA; 3	MON; SPR; 4	RBR; FEA	RBR; SPR																	15th	27
2015	Daiko Team Lazarus									SIL; FEA; 15	SIL; SPR; 24			SPA; FEA; 12	SPA; SPR; 9	MNZ; FEA; 11	MNZ; SPR; 6	SOC; FEA; Ret	SOC; SPR; 17	BHR; FEA; 12	BHR; SPR; 17	YMC; FEA; 12	YMC; SPR; C			15th	27
2015	Hilmer Motorsport											HUN; FEA; Ret	HUN; SPR; 16													15th	27
2016	Carlin	CAT; FEA; 5	CAT; SPR; 9	MON; FEA; 12	MON; SPR; 10	BAK; FEA; Ret	BAK; SPR; 6	RBR; FEA; Ret	RBR; SPR; 10	SIL; FEA; 13	SIL; SPR; 9	HUN; FEA; 18	HUN; SPR; 9	HOC; FEA	HOC; SPR	SPA; FEA; 12	SPA; SPR; 7	MNZ; FEA; Ret	MNZ; SPR; 13	SEP; FEA; 10	SEP; SPR; 15	YMC; FEA; 12	YMC; SPR; 12			19th	17
2017	Trident	BHR; FEA; 14	BHR; SPR; 11	CAT; FEA; Ret	CAT; SPR; 10	MON; FEA; 10	MON; SPR; 17	BAK; FEA; 9	BAK; SPR; 15																	14th	21
2017	Rapax									RBR; FEA; 15	RBR; SPR; 9	SIL; FEA; 5	SIL; SPR; 4	HUN; FEA; Ret	HUN; SPR; Ret	SPA; FEA	SPA; SPR	MNZ; FEA	MNZ; SPR	JER; FEA	JER; SPR	YMC; FEA	YMC; SPR			14th	21
