= 2012 Hungaroring GP2 Series round =

Car race

(Hungary) 2012 Hungaroring GP2 round
Round details
- Round 9 of 12 rounds in the 2012 GP2 Series
- Layout of the Hungaroring circuit
- Location: Hungaroring, Mogyoród, Hungary
- Course: Permanent racing facility 4.381 km (2.722 mi)

GP2 Series

Feature race
- Date: 28 July 2012
- Laps: 37

Pole position
Driver	(United Kingdom) Max Chilton	Carlin
- Time: 1:28.980

Podium
First	(United Kingdom) Max Chilton	Carlin
Second	(Italy) Davide Valsecchi	DAMS
Third	(Brazil) Luiz Razia	Arden International

Fastest lap
Driver	(Switzerland) Simon Trummer	Arden International
- Time: 1:32.164 (on lap 32)

Sprint race
- Date: 29 July 2012
- Laps: 28

Podium
First	(Mexico) Esteban Gutiérrez	Lotus GP
Second	(France) Nathanaël Berthon	Racing Engineering
Third	(Brazil) Luiz Razia	Arden International

Fastest lap
Driver	(Mexico) Esteban Gutiérrez	Lotus GP
- Time: 1:32.348 (on lap 15)

The 2012 Hungaroring GP2 Series round was a GP2 Series motor race held on July 28 and 29, 2012 at Hungaroring, Hungary. It was the ninth round of the 2012 GP2 season. The race supported the 2012 Hungarian Grand Prix.

== Classification ==
=== Qualifying ===
Pos.	No.	Driver	Team	Time	Grid
1	26	(United Kingdom) Max Chilton	Marussia Carlin	1:28.980	1
2	9	(United Kingdom) James Calado	Lotus GP	1:29.003	4
3	3	(Italy) Davide Valsecchi	DAMS	1:29.034	2
4	8	(United Kingdom) Jolyon Palmer	iSport International	1:29.093	3
5	23	(Brazil) Luiz Razia	Arden International	1:29.177	5
6	12	(Netherlands) Giedo van der Garde	Caterham Racing	1:29.202	6
7	10	(Mexico) Esteban Gutiérrez	Lotus GP	1:29.248	7
8	5	(Switzerland) Fabio Leimer	Racing Engineering	1:29.334	8
9	7	(Sweden) Marcus Ericsson	iSport International	1:29.345	9
10	1	(Venezuela) Johnny Cecotto Jr.	Barwa Addax Team	1:29.367	10
11	2	(Czech Republic) Josef Král	Barwa Addax Team	1:29.472	11
12	6	(France) Nathanaël Berthon	Racing Engineering	1:29.496	12
13	4	(Brazil) Felipe Nasr	DAMS	1:29.574	13
14	15	(Italy) Fabio Onidi	Scuderia Coloni	1:29.637	14
15	18	(Spain) Sergio Canamasas	Venezuela GP Lazarus	1:29.666	15
16	25	(Netherlands) Nigel Melker	Ocean Racing Technology	1:29.717	16
17	27	(Indonesia) Rio Haryanto	Marussia Carlin	1:29.786	17
18	24	(Brazil) Victor Guerin	Ocean Racing Technology	1:29.786	18
19	21	(Monaco) Stefano Coletti	Rapax	1:29.906	19
20	16	(Monaco) Stéphane Richelmi	Trident Racing	1:30.027	20
21	11	(Venezuela) Rodolfo González	Caterham Racing	1:30.201	21
22	17	(Colombia) Julián Leal	Trident Racing	1:30.202	22
23	20	(Portugal) Ricardo Teixeira	Rapax	1:30.475	23
24	22	(Switzerland) Simon Trummer	Arden International	1:30.655	24
25	21	(Netherlands) Daniël de Jong	Rapax	1:30.930	25
26	19	(Venezuela) Giancarlo Serenelli	Venezuela GP Lazarus	1:33.093	26

=== Feature race ===
Pos.	No.	Driver	Team	Laps	Time/Retired	Grid	Points
1	26	(United Kingdom) Max Chilton	Marussia Carlin	37	59:02.965	1	29 (25+4)
2	3	(Italy) Davide Valsecchi	DAMS	37	+0.628	2	20 (18+2)
3	23	(Brazil) Luiz Razia	Arden International	37	+1.538	5	15
4	9	(United Kingdom) James Calado	Lotus GP	37	+4.090	4	12
5	12	(Netherlands) Giedo van der Garde	Caterham Racing	37	+9.070	6	10
6	8	(United Kingdom) Jolyon Palmer	iSport International	37	+11.835	3	8
7	6	(France) Nathanaël Berthon	Racing Engineering	37	+18.166	12	6
8	10	(Mexico) Esteban Gutiérrez	Lotus GP	37	+18.756	7	4
9	5	(Switzerland) Fabio Leimer	Racing Engineering	37	+19.724	8	2
10	14	(Monaco) Stefano Coletti	Scuderia Coloni	37	+21.106	19	1
11	15	(Italy) Fabio Onidi	Scuderia Coloni	37	+30.046	14	
12	27	(Indonesia) Rio Haryanto	Marussia Carlin	37	+36.672	17	
13	22	(Switzerland) Simon Trummer	Arden International	37	+36.999	24	
14	25	(Netherlands) Nigel Melker	Ocean Racing Technology	37	+37.388	16	
15	21	(Netherlands) Daniël de Jong	Rapax	37	+39.591	25	
16	17	(Colombia) Julián Leal	Trident Racing	37	+46.010	22	
17	16	(Monaco) Stéphane Richelmi	Trident Racing	37	+46.197	20	
18	7	(Sweden) Marcus Ericsson	iSport International	37	+1:06.294	9	
19	20	(Portugal) Ricardo Teixeira	Rapax	37	+1:31.506	23	
20	19	(Venezuela) Giancarlo Serenelli	Venezuela GP Lazarus	37	+1:44.003	26	
21	24	(Brazil) Victor Guerin	Ocean Racing Technology	36	+1 Lap	18	
22	18	(Spain) Sergio Canamasas	Venezuela GP Lazarus	36	+1 Lap	15	
23	11	(Venezuela) Rodolfo González	Caterham Racing	36	+1 Lap	21	
24	2	(Czech Republic) Josef Král	Barwa Addax Team	34	Suspension	11	
25	4	(Brazil) Felipe Nasr	DAMS	33	Brakes	13	
Ret	1	(Venezuela) Johnny Cecotto Jr.	Barwa Addax Team	4	Accident	10	
Fastest lap: Simon Trummer (Arden International) — 1:32.164 (on lap 32)

=== Sprint race ===
Pos.	No.	Driver	Team	Laps	Time/Retired	Grid	Points
1	10	(Mexico) Esteban Gutiérrez	Lotus GP	28	42:58.301	1	17 (15+2)
2	6	(France) Nathanaël Berthon	Racing Engineering	28	+3.565	2	12
3	23	(Brazil) Luiz Razia	Arden International	28	+15.733	6	10
4	3	(Italy) Davide Valsecchi	DAMS	28	+1:13.352	7	8
5	8	(United Kingdom) Jolyon Palmer	iSport International	28	+1:14.237	3	6
6	9	(United Kingdom) James Calado	Lotus GP	28	+ 1:14.493	5	4
7	27	(Indonesia) Rio Haryanto	Marussia Carlin	28	+1:16.336	12	2
8	4	(Brazil) Felipe Nasr	DAMS	28	+1:17.578	25	1
9	14	(Monaco) Stefano Coletti	Scuderia Coloni	28	+1:23.475	10	
10	12	(Netherlands) Giedo van der Garde	Caterham Racing	28	+1:25.928	4	
11	26	(United Kingdom) Max Chilton	Marussia Carlin	28	+1:28.868	8	
12	18	(Spain) Sergio Canamasas	Venezuela GP Lazarus	28	+1:29.399	22	
13	22	(Switzerland) Simon Trummer	Arden International	28	+1:29.417	13	
14	5	(Switzerland) Fabio Leimer	Racing Engineering	28	+1:30.221	9	
15	17	(Colombia) Julián Leal	Trident Racing	28	+1:30.937	16	
16	11	(Venezuela) Rodolfo González	Caterham Racing	28	+1:33.087	23	
17	2	(Czech Republic) Josef Král	Barwa Addax Team	28	+1:34.058	24	
18	25	(Netherlands) Nigel Melker	Ocean Racing Technology	28	+1:35.753	14	
19	21	(Netherlands) Daniël de Jong	Rapax	28	+1:38.037	15	
20	20	(Portugal) Ricardo Teixeira	Rapax	28	+1:38.870	19	
21	16	(Monaco) Stéphane Richelmi	Trident Racing	28	+1:39.887	17	
22	19	(Venezuela) Giancarlo Serenelli	Venezuela GP Lazarus	28	+1:48.537	20	
23	24	(Brazil) Victor Guerin	Ocean Racing Technology	28	+1:53.900	21	
24	15	(Italy) Fabio Onidi	Scuderia Coloni	27	+1 Lap	11	
Ret	1	(Venezuela) Johnny Cecotto Jr.	Barwa Addax Team	10	Spun off	26	
Ret	7	(Sweden) Marcus Ericsson	iSport International	1	Accident	18	
Fastest lap: Esteban Gutiérrez (Lotus GP) — 1:32.348 (on lap 15)

== Standings after the round ==
Drivers' Championship standings

	Pos	Driver	Points
	1	(Brazil) Luiz Razia	196
	2	(Italy) Davide Valsecchi	189
	3	(Mexico) Esteban Gutiérrez	150
1	4	(United Kingdom) James Calado	132
1	5	(Netherlands) Giedo van der Garde	129

Teams' Championship standings

	Pos	Team	Points
	1	(France) Lotus GP	282
	2	(France) DAMS	258
	3	(United Kingdom) Arden	200
	4	(Spain) Racing Engineering	156
1	5	(United Kingdom) Carlin	153

- Note: Only the top five positions are included for both sets of standings.

== See also ==
- 2012 Hungarian Grand Prix
- 2012 Hungaroring GP3 Series round

Previous round: 2012 Hockenheimring GP2 round	GP2 Series; 2012 season	Next round: 2012 Spa-Francorchamps GP2 round
Previous round: 2011 Hungaroring GP2 round	Hungaroring GP2 round	Next round: 2013 Hungaroring GP2 round
