= 2014 Hungaroring GP2 Series round =

2014 Hungary GP2 round
Round details
- Round 6 of 12 rounds in the 2014 GP2 Series
- Layout of the Hungaroring
- Location: Hungaroring, Mogyoród, Pest, Hungary
- Course: Permanent racing facility 4.381 km (2.722 mi)

GP2 Series

Feature race
- Date: 26 July 2014
- Laps: 35

Pole position
Driver	(Brazil) Felipe Nasr	Carlin
- Time: 1:28.436

Podium
First	(France) Arthur Pic	Campos Racing
Second	(United Kingdom) Adrian Quaife-Hobbs	Rapax
Third	(Japan) Takuya Izawa	ART Grand Prix

Fastest lap
Driver	(New Zealand) Mitch Evans	RT Russian Time
- Time: 1:32.705 (on lap 29)

Sprint race
- Date: 27 July 2014
- Laps: 28

Podium
First	(Belgium) Stoffel Vandoorne	ART Grand Prix
Second	(United Kingdom) Jolyon Palmer	DAMS
Third	(Brazil) Felipe Nasr	Carlin

Fastest lap
Driver	(Belgium) Stoffel Vandoorne	ART Grand Prix
- Time: 1:32.541 (on lap 28)

The 2014 Hungary GP2 Series round was a pair of motor races held on July 26 and 27, 2014 at the Hungaroring in Mogyoród, Pest, Hungary as part of the GP2 Series. It is the sixth round of the 2014 season. The race weekend supported the 2014 Hungarian Grand Prix.

== Report ==
=== Qualifying ===
Going into the qualifying session, Felipe Nasr was placed in second place in the overall championship. His target was of course to beat his championship rival Jolyon Palmer, but also to get that pole position and four crucial points that could make or break a championship title. In the end, Nasr qualified on pole position ahead of Tom Dillmann, with Palmer down in sixth place.

== Classification ==
=== Qualifying ===
Pos.	No.	Driver	Team	Time	Grid
1	3	(Brazil) Felipe Nasr	Carlin	1:28.436	1
2	19	(France) Tom Dillmann	EQ8 Caterham Racing	1:28.618	2
3	26	(France) Arthur Pic	Campos Racing	1:28.643	3
4	27	(Japan) Kimiya Sato	Campos Racing	1:28.658	4
5	23	(Venezuela) Johnny Cecotto Jr.	Trident	1:28.709	8^{1}
6	10	(Belgium) Stoffel Vandoorne	ART Grand Prix	1:28.740	5
7	7	(United Kingdom) Jolyon Palmer	DAMS	1:28.791	6
8	5	(Italy) Raffaele Marciello	Racing Engineering	1:28.932	7
9	21	(Denmark) Marco Sørensen	MP Motorsport	1:28.935	9
10	8	(Monaco) Stéphane Richelmi	DAMS	1:28.941	10
11	1	(New Zealand) Mitch Evans	RT Russian Time	1:28.969	11
12	4	(Colombia) Julián Leal	Carlin	1:29.008	12
13	15	(Switzerland) Simon Trummer	Rapax	1:29.060	13
14	11	(Germany) Daniel Abt	Hilmer Motorsport	1:29.125	14
15	6	(Monaco) Stefano Coletti	Racing Engineering	1:29.139	15
16	22	(Spain) Sergio Canamasas	Trident	1:29.142	16
17	20	(Netherlands) Daniël de Jong	MP Motorsport	1:29.143	17
18	24	(France) Nathanaël Berthon	Venezuela GP Lazarus	1:29.217	18
19	25	(United States) Conor Daly	Venezuela GP Lazarus	1:29.233	19
20	18	(Indonesia) Rio Haryanto	EQ8 Caterham Racing	1:29.277	20
21	17	(Brazil) André Negrão	Arden International	1:29.292	21
22	14	(United Kingdom) Adrian Quaife-Hobbs	Rapax	1:29.462	22
23	12	(United Kingdom) Jon Lancaster	Hilmer Motorsport	1:29.680	23
24	16	(Austria) René Binder	Arden International	1:29.895	24
25	2	(Russia) Artem Markelov	RT Russian Time	1:30.078	25
26	9	(Japan) Takuya Izawa	ART Grand Prix	1:30.427	26

Notes:

- ^1 — Johnny Cecotto Jr. was given a three-place grid penalty after being judged to have caused a collision with Jolyon Palmer during Saturday's practise session.

=== Feature race ===
Pos.	No.	Driver	Team	Laps	Time/Retired	Grid	Points
1	26	(France) Arthur Pic	Campos Racing	37	1:00:18.627	3	25
2	14	(United Kingdom) Adrian Quaife-Hobbs	Rapax	37	+3.151	22	18
3	9	(Japan) Takuya Izawa	ART Grand Prix	37	+3.661	26	15
4	7	(United Kingdom) Jolyon Palmer	DAMS	37	+3.828	6	12
5	11	(Germany) Daniel Abt	Hilmer Motorsport	37	+5.111	14	10
6	3	(Brazil) Felipe Nasr	Carlin	37	+5.190	1	12 (8+4)
7	10	(Belgium) Stoffel Vandoorne	ART Grand Prix	37	+6.213	5	6
8	24	(France) Nathanaël Berthon	Venezuela GP Lazarus	37	+7.038	18	4
9	19	(France) Tom Dillmann	EQ8 Caterham Racing	37	+7.605	2	4 (2+2)
10	21	(Denmark) Marco Sørensen	MP Motorsport	37	+8.102	9	1
11	15	(Switzerland) Simon Trummer	Rapax	37	+8.398	13	
12	1	(New Zealand) Mitch Evans	RT Russian Time	37	+8.756	11	
13	25	(United States) Conor Daly	Venezuela GP Lazarus	37	+11.641	19	
14	20	(Netherlands) Daniël de Jong	MP Motorsport	37	+13.436	17	
15	17	(Brazil) André Negrão	Arden International	37	+14.224	21	
16	2	(Russia) Artem Markelov	RT Russian Time	37	+15.944	25	
17	12	(United Kingdom) Jon Lancaster	Hilmer Motorsport	37	+16.066	23	
18	6	(Monaco) Stefano Coletti	Racing Engineering	37	+22.787^{1}	15	
19	5	(Italy) Raffaele Marciello	Racing Engineering	37	+25.594^{1}	7	
20	16	(Austria) René Binder	Arden International	36	+1 lap	24	
Ret	18	(Indonesia) Rio Haryanto	EQ8 Caterham Racing	30	Did not finish	20	
Ret	22	(Spain) Sergio Canamasas	Trident	29	Collision	16	
Ret	23	(Venezuela) Johnny Cecotto Jr.	Trident	22	Did not finish	8	
Ret	27	(Japan) Kimiya Sato	Campos Racing	10	Did not finish	4	
Ret	8	(Monaco) Stéphane Richelmi	DAMS	5	Collision	10	
Ret	4	(Colombia) Julián Leal	Carlin	5	Did not finish	12	
Fastest lap: Mitch Evans (RT Russian Time) — 1:32.705 (on lap 29)
Source: Feat.

Notes:

- ^{1} —Both Raffaele Marciello and Stefano Coletti received a 20-second time penalty post-race. Marciello was penalised for overtaking Stoffel Vandoorne under neutralised safety car conditions, while Coletti was penalised for forcing Julián Leal off the track at turn 12, causing Leal to retire. They finished second and sixth respectively prior to the penalties.

== See also ==
- 2014 Hungarian Grand Prix
- 2014 Hungaroring GP3 Series round

Previous round: 2014 Hockenheimring GP2 Series round	GP2 Series; 2014 season	Next round: 2014 Spa-Francorchamps GP2 Series round
Previous round: 2013 Hungaroring GP2 Series round	Hungary GP2 round	Next round: 2015 Hungaroring GP2 Series round
