= 2014 Hockenheimring GP2 Series round =

Motor race held in Hockenheim, Germany

2014 Germany GP2 round
Round details
- Round 5 of 12 rounds in the 2014 GP2 Series
- Layout of the Hockenheimring
- Location: Hockenheimring, Hockenheim, Germany
- Course: Permanent racing facility 4.574 km (2.842 mi)

GP2 Series

Feature race
- Date: 19 July 2014
- Laps: 38

Pole position
Driver	(United Kingdom) Jolyon Palmer	DAMS
- Time: 1:23.383

Podium
First	(New Zealand) Mitch Evans	RT Russian Time
Second	(Belgium) Stoffel Vandoorne	ART Grand Prix
Third	(United Kingdom) Jolyon Palmer	DAMS

Fastest lap
Driver	(United Kingdom) Jolyon Palmer	DAMS
- Time: 1:27.163 (on lap 26)

Sprint race
- Date: 20 July 2014
- Laps: 26

Podium
First	(Monaco) Stefano Coletti	Racing Engineering
Second	(Brazil) Felipe Nasr	Carlin
Third	(Belgium) Stoffel Vandoorne	ART Grand Prix

Fastest lap
Driver	(Monaco) Stefano Coletti	Racing Engineering
- Time: 1:25.449 (on lap 26)

The 2014 Hockenheimring GP2 Series round was a GP2 Series motor race held on July 19 and 20, 2014 at Hockenheimring in Hockenheim, Germany. It was the fifth round of the 2014 GP2 Season. The race weekend supported the 2014 German Grand Prix.

== Classification ==
=== Qualifying ===
Pos.	No.	Driver	Team	Time	Grid
1	7	(United Kingdom) Jolyon Palmer	DAMS	1:23.383	1
2	10	(Belgium) Stoffel Vandoorne	ART Grand Prix	1:23.665	2
3	6	(Monaco) Stefano Coletti	Racing Engineering	1:23.722	3
4	19	(France) Tom Dillmann	EQ8 Caterham Racing	1:23.776	4
5	3	(Brazil) Felipe Nasr	Carlin	1:23.781	5
6	26	(France) Arthur Pic	Campos Racing	1:23.859	6
7	23	(Venezuela) Johnny Cecotto Jr.	Trident Racing	1:23.860	7
8	5	(Italy) Raffaele Marciello	Racing Engineering	1:23.918	8
9	27	(United States) Alexander Rossi	Campos Racing	1:23.965	9
10	15	(Switzerland) Simon Trummer	Rapax	1:23.983	10
11	8	(Monaco) Stéphane Richelmi	DAMS	1:24.024	11
12	16	(Austria) René Binder	Arden International	1:24.094	12
13	24	(France) Nathanaël Berthon	Venezuela GP Lazarus	1:24.253	13
14	11	(Germany) Daniel Abt	Hilmer Motorsport	1:24.311	14
15	1	(New Zealand) Mitch Evans	RT Russian Time	1:24.335	15
16	9	(Japan) Takuya Izawa	ART Grand Prix	1:24.335	16
17	4	(Colombia) Julián Leal	Carlin	1:24.421	17
18	25	(United States) Conor Daly	Venezuela GP Lazarus	1:24.437	18
19	12	(United Kingdom) Jon Lancaster	Hilmer Motorsport	1:24.453	19
20	17	(Brazil) André Negrão	Arden International	1:24.476	20
21	2	(Russia) Artem Markelov	RT Russian Time	1:24.496	21
22	18	(Indonesia) Rio Haryanto	EQ8 Caterham Racing	1:24.502	22
23	14	(United Kingdom) Adrian Quaife-Hobbs	Rapax	1:24.590	23
24	22	(Spain) Sergio Canamasas	Trident Racing	1:24.598	24
25	21	(Denmark) Marco Sørensen	MP Motorsport	1:24.888	25
26	20	(Netherlands) Daniël de Jong	MP Motorsport	1:25.189	26

=== Feature race ===
Pos.	No.	Driver	Team	Laps	Time/Retired	Grid	Points
1	1	(New Zealand) Mitch Evans	RT Russian Time	38	58:15.099	15	25
2	10	(Belgium) Stoffel Vandoorne	ART Grand Prix	38	+0.414	2	18
3	7	(United Kingdom) Jolyon Palmer	DAMS	38	+2.755	1	21 (15+4+2)
4	6	(Monaco) Stefano Coletti	Racing Engineering	38	+20.191	3	12
5	3	(Brazil) Felipe Nasr	Carlin	38	+20.687	5	10
6	15	(Switzerland) Simon Trummer	Rapax	38	+23.432	10	8
7	23	(Venezuela) Johnny Cecotto Jr.	Trident	38	+30.583	7	6
8	24	(France) Nathanaël Berthon	Venezuela GP Lazarus	38	+33.160	13	4
9	21	(Denmark) Marco Sørensen	MP Motorsport	38	+35.879	25	2
10	8	(Monaco) Stéphane Richelmi	DAMS	38	+36.857	11	1
11	16	(Austria) René Binder	Arden International	38	+37.111	12	
12	19	(France) Tom Dillmann	EQ8 Caterham Racing	38	+38.081	4	
13	9	(Japan) Takuya Izawa	ART Grand Prix	38	+43.096	16	
14	14	(United Kingdom) Adrian Quaife-Hobbs	Rapax	38	+47.572	23	
15	22	(Spain) Sergio Canamasas	Trident Racing	38	+49.996	24	
16	4	(Colombia) Julián Leal	Carlin	38	+58.217	17	
17	5	(Italy) Raffaele Marciello	Racing Engineering	38	+1:02.333	8	
18	17	(Brazil) André Negrão	Arden International	38	+1:04.818	20	
19	26	(France) Arthur Pic	Campos Racing	38	+1:05.181	6	
20	11	(Germany) Daniel Abt	Hilmer Motorsport	38	+1:09.082	14	
21	25	(United States) Conor Daly	Venezuela GP Lazarus	38	+1:09.244	18	
22	18	(Indonesia) Rio Haryanto	EQ8 Caterham Racing	37	Did not finish	22	
Ret	12	(United Kingdom) Jon Lancaster	Hilmer Motorsport	24	Did not finish	19	
Ret	20	(Netherlands) Daniël de Jong	MP Motorsport	12	Did not finish	26	
Ret	27	(United States) Alexander Rossi	Campos Racing	5	Did not finish	9	
Ret	2	(Russia) Artem Markelov	RT Russian Time	0	Did not finish	21	
Fastest lap: Jolyon Palmer (DAMS) — 1:27.163 (on lap 26)
Source: Feat.

=== Sprint race ===
Pos.	No.	Driver	Team	Laps	Time/Retired	Grid	Points
1	6	(Monaco) Stefano Coletti	Racing Engineering	26	45:31.696	5	17 (15+2)
2	3	(Brazil) Felipe Nasr	Carlin	26	+1.238	4	12
3	10	(Belgium) Stoffel Vandoorne	ART Grand Prix	26	+5.531	7	10
4	21	(Denmark) Marco Sørensen	MP Motorsport	26	+15.656	9	8
5	12	(United Kingdom) Jon Lancaster	Hilmer Motorsport	26	+17.961	23	6
6	7	(United Kingdom) Jolyon Palmer	DAMS	26	+18.401	6	4
7	27	(United States) Alexander Rossi	Campos Racing	26	+19.840	25	2
8	14	(United Kingdom) Adrian Quaife-Hobbs	Rapax	26	+24.222	14	1
9	19	(France) Tom Dillmann	EQ8 Caterham Racing	26	+25.438	12	
10	18	(Indonesia) Rio Haryanto	EQ8 Caterham Racing	26	+36.088	22	
11	1	(New Zealand) Mitch Evans	RT Russian Time	26	+39.177	8	
12	2	(Russia) Artem Markelov	RT Russian Time	26	+40.186	26	
13	22	(Spain) Sergio Canamasas	Trident	26	+45.938	15	
14	15	(Switzerland) Simon Trummer	Rapax	26	+52.486	3	
15	11	(Germany) Daniel Abt	Hilmer Motorsport	26	+54.865	20	
16	20	(Netherlands) Daniël de Jong	MP Motorsport	26	+55.552	24	
17	24	(France) Nathanaël Berthon	Venezuela GP Lazarus	26	+56.878	1	
18	4	(Colombia) Julián Leal	Carlin	26	+1:03.994	16	
19	9	(Japan) Takuya Izawa	ART Grand Prix	26	+1:08.828	13	
20	25	(United States) Conor Daly	Venezuela GP Lazarus	26	+1:09.713	21	
21	17	(Brazil) André Negrão	Arden International	26	+1:12.677	18	
22	16	(Austria) René Binder	Arden International	26	+1:15.032	11	
Ret	23	(Venezuela) Johnny Cecotto Jr.	Trident	21	Did not finish	2	
Ret	26	(France) Arthur Pic	Campos Racing	11	Did not finish	19	
Ret	5	(Italy) Raffaele Marciello	Racing Engineering	7	Did not finish	17	
Ret	8	(Monaco) Stéphane Richelmi	DAMS	0	Did not finish	10	
Fastest lap: Stefano Coletti (Racing Engineering) — 1:25.449 (on lap 26)
Source: Sprint

== See also ==
- 2014 German Grand Prix
- 2014 Hockenheimring GP3 Series round

Previous round: 2014 Silverstone GP2 Series round	GP2 Series; 2014 season	Next round: 2014 Hungaroring GP2 Series round
Previous round: 2012 Hockenheimring GP2 Series round	Hockenheimring GP2 round	Next round: 2016 Hockenheimring GP2 Series round
