= 2013 Bahrain GP2 Series round =

Pair of motor races at the Bahrain International Circuit

2013 Bahrain GP2 round
Round details
- Round 2 of 11 rounds in the 2013 GP2 Series
- Layout of the Bahrain International Circuit
- Location: Bahrain International Circuit, Sakhir, Bahrain
- Course: Permanent racing facility 5.406 km (3.359 mi)

GP2 Series

Feature race
- Date: 20 April 2013
- Laps: 32

Pole position
Driver	(Switzerland) Fabio Leimer	Racing Engineering
- Time: 1:39.427

Podium
First	(Switzerland) Fabio Leimer	Racing Engineering
Second	(Monaco) Stefano Coletti	Rapax
Third	(United States) Alexander Rossi	Caterham Racing

Fastest lap
Driver	(Venezuela) Johnny Cecotto Jr.	Arden International
- Time: 1:45.115 (on lap 28)

Sprint race
- Date: 21 April 2013
- Laps: 23

Podium
First	(United Kingdom) Sam Bird	Russian Time
Second	(Brazil) Felipe Nasr	Carlin
Third	(Monaco) Stefano Coletti	Rapax

Fastest lap
Driver	(United Kingdom) Sam Bird	Russian Time
- Time: 1:45.465 (on lap 4)

The 2013 Bahrain GP2 Series round was a pair of motor races held on 20 and 21 April 2013 at the Bahrain International Circuit in Sakhir, Bahrain as part of the GP2 Series. It was the second round of the 2013 GP2 Series and was run in support of the 2013 Bahrain Grand Prix. The first race, a 32-lap feature event, was won by Racing Engineering driver Fabio Leimer from pole position. Stefano Coletti finished second for Rapax and Caterham Racing driver Alexander Rossi took third. Sam Bird won the following day's 30-lap sprint race for Russian Time, with Carlin's Felipe Nasr second and Coletti third.

Leimer held off the fast-starting Coletti to keep the lead and pulled out a significant gap in the following laps before ceding the lead to Adrian Quaife-Hobbs for ten laps after a mandatory pit stop for tyres. Leimer retook first place after Quaife-Hobbs's pit stop and held the position to win the race. Tom Dillmann started from pole position in the sprint race but lost the lead to teammate Bird before the end of the first lap. Coletti and Nasr gained on Bird in the final two laps as his tyres were worn. Coletti bowed out after running wide and lost second to Nasr before the final lap and Bird held off Nasr to win the race by 0.080 seconds, the closest margin of victory in GP2 Series history.

Leimer's feature race win was his second of the season and Bird's sprint event victory was the first for Russian Time after it took over from ISport International. Leimer lowered Coletti's lead in the Drivers' Championship to one point Nasr maintained third position and Bird's victory moved him to fourth. James Calado performed poorly and fell to fifth. Carlin lowered Rapax's lead in the Teams' Championship to two points. Racing Engineering fell to third and Russian Time moved to fourth with nine rounds left in the season.

== Background ==
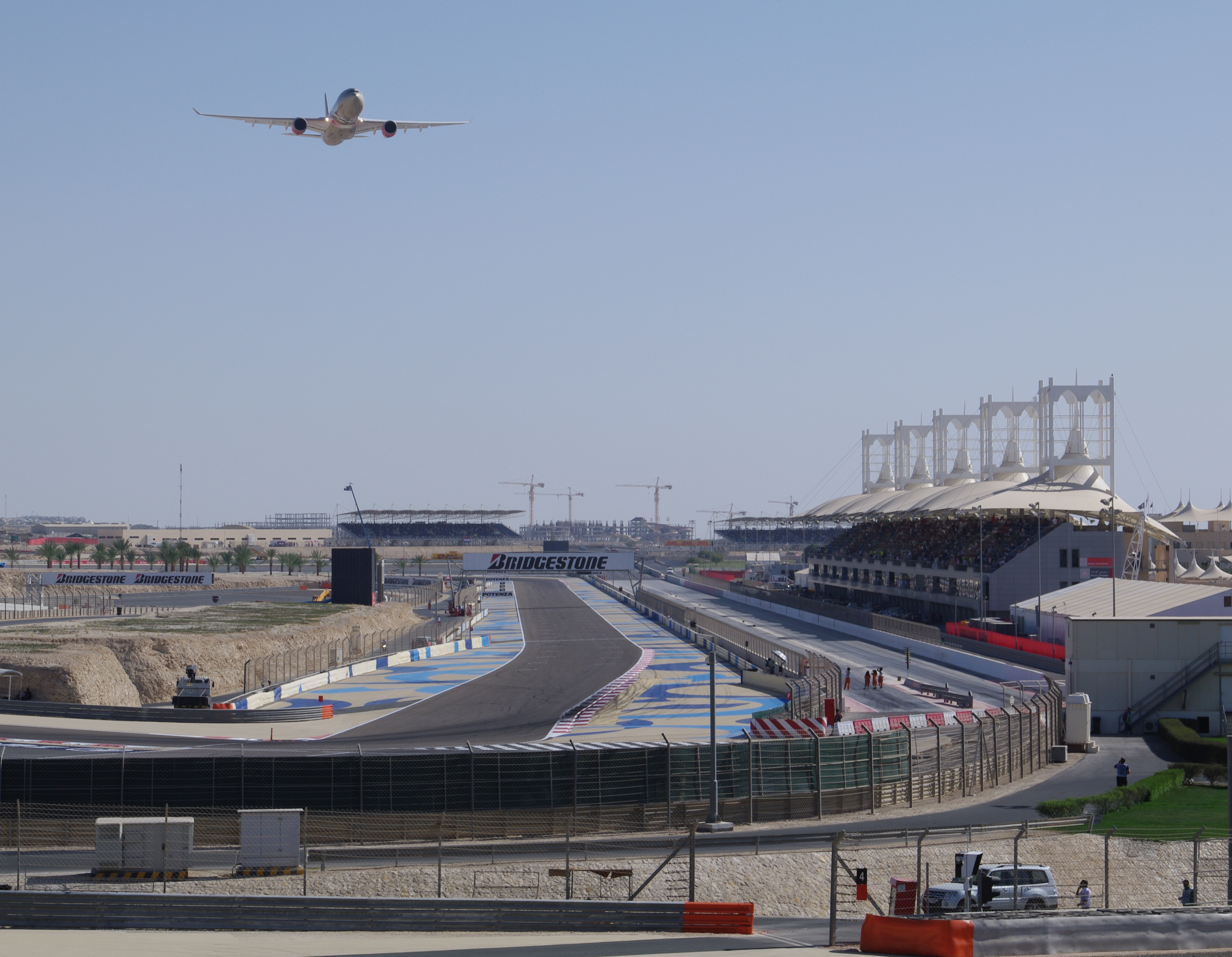
Bahrain International Circuit, where the race was held.

The 2013 Bahrain GP2 Series round was the second of eleven scheduled events in 2013. It was held on 20 and 21 April 2013 at the Bahrain International Circuit in Sakhir, and supported the 2013 Bahrain Grand Prix. Tyre supplier Pirelli brought the yellow-banded soft compound tyres and the orange-banded hard dry compound tyres to the race.

Before the race Rapax driver Stefano Coletti led the Drivers' Championship with 36 points, eleven ahead of Fabio Leimer in second, who in turn, was a further point in front of Felipe Nasr in third. James Calado was fourth on 18 points and Stéphane Richelmi in fifth was six points behind him. Rapax led the Teams' Championship on 42 points; Racing Engineering was seven points behind in second and Carlin were in third with 32 points. ART Grand Prix were in fourth position with 18 points and Arden International were one point behind in fifth. Leimer and Coletti had won the season's previous two races in the opening round in Sepang three weeks prior. Calado and Nasr each took one second-place finish and Mitch Evans had finished in third once.

A total of 26 drivers making up 13 teams were entered for the round with all of them piloting the Dallara GP2/11 car. There were two driver changes for the round. Having been in one of the Caterham Racing cars in the preceding round in Sepang, Ma Qinghua was replaced by the former Formula Renaullt 3.5 Series driver Alexander Rossi for the rest of the year. Robin Frijns, the reigning Formula Renault 3.5 Series champion and test and reserve driver for Sauber, was employed by Hilmer Motorsport to drive in lieu of Conor Daly who left the team after Sepang since he was on a one-round contract with them.

== Practice and qualifying ==
One half an hour practice session was held on Thursday before the two races. Leimer for Racing Engineering set a benchmark which led the sole practice session—held in variable weather and on a warm track—at 1:41.361 on the hard compound tyres, a second faster than any one else. His closest challenger was Sam Bird for Russian Time in second in front of third-placed Coletti. Rossi, Marcus Ericsson of DAMS, Nasr, Calado, Russian Time's Tom Dillmann, Johnny Cecotto Jr. of Arden International and Daniel Abt for ART Grand Prix were in positions four to ten. Frijns spun early on but recovered without external assistance. Smoke bellowed out of Cecotto's car at high-speed and he locked his tyres at turn one, overshooting into the sand. Julián Leal stalled at the exit of the pit lane and the stewards investigated whether his mechanics restarted the car outside the pit lane. Leal then narrowly avoided running into the rear of Rossi's car.

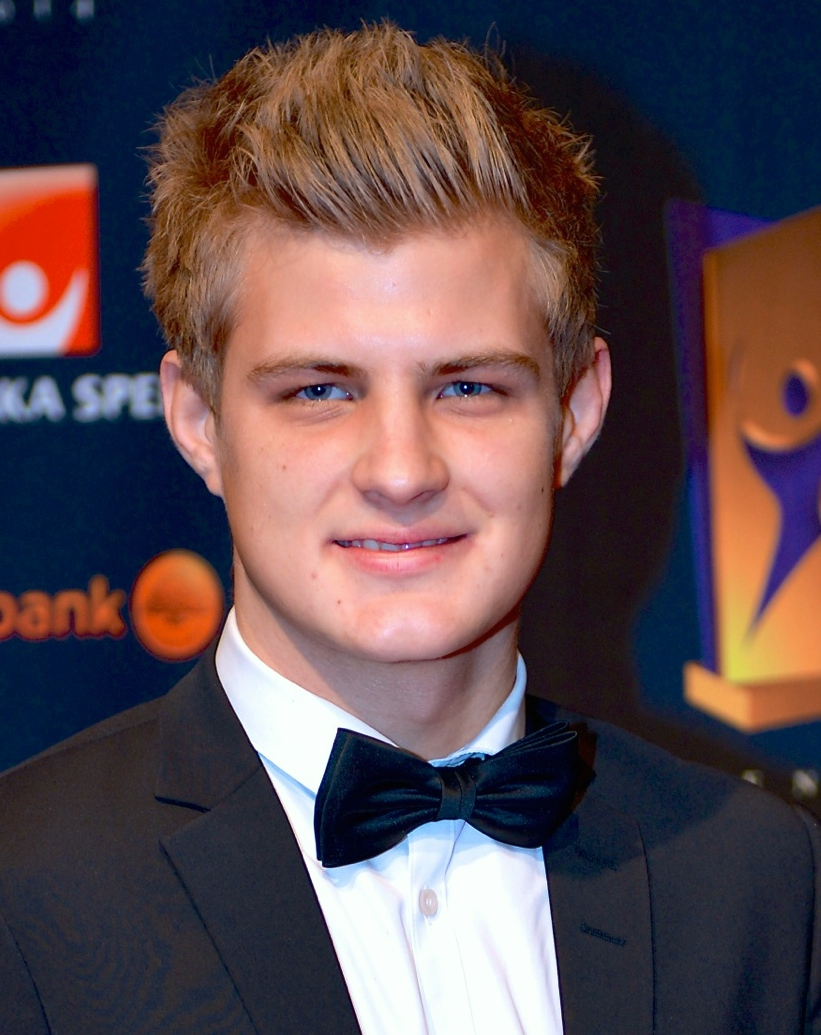
Marcus Ericsson (pictured in 2014) was one of qualifying pace setters but eventually started from second on the grid.

Friday afternoon's 30-minute qualifying session saw the drivers' fastest lap times determine the starting order for the first race. The pole position winner was awarded four points for the Drivers' and Teams' Championships. Qualifying began in cloudy weather and most of the field drove onto the track when it started. Rainfall after the first five minutes was not heavy enough to affect the track. Simon Trummer was the early pace setter but was soon eclipsed by his teammate Coletti, who in turn, was suppressed by Ericsson. Leimer then set a new GP2 Series lap record of the track, which he lowered to a 1:39.427 lap to take pole position. Ericsson appeared to challenge Leimer for pole but slowed after losing time in the final third of the lap to join him on the grid's front row with a time almost a second slower. Nasr equalled his qualifying result from the 2012 round in third. Coletti improved his own fastest lap to go fourth. Dillmann was best of the late improvers and qualified fifth. Richelmi was close by in sixth. Rossi was in the top three early on but fell to seventh by the end. Adrian Quaife-Hobbs (MP Motorsport) locked his tyres on his lap and took eighth. Bird improved late in the session to secure ninth and Frijns took tenth.

Calado was the fastest driver not to qualify in the top ten and was demoted ten places on the grid for causing an accident at the previous round in Sepang. Trummer moved to eleventh and Palmer twelfth, followed by Cecotto and Abt. Sergio Canamasas (Caterham Racing) set the 16th-fastest lap but was sent to the back of the grid after being adjudged by the race stewards to have deliberately forced Trident's Kevin Ceccon off the track while attempting to pass him after qualifying. Kevin Giovesi (Lazarus) was also penalised after the stewards ruled that he impeded Cecotto between turns nine and ten and dropped three places on the grid. Mitch Evans (Arden International) was the only driver to be affected by electrical problem in his car and pulled off onto a run-off area. Evans was restricted to starting 16th. The rest of the field lined up as Ceccon, Leal, René Binder (Lazarus), Jake Rosenzweig (Addax), Nathanaël Berthon (Trident), Pål Varhaug (Hilmer Motorsport), Rio Haryanto (Addax) and Daniël de Jong (MP Motorsport).

=== Qualifying classification ===
Pos.	No.	Driver	Team	Time	Gap	Grid
1	8	(Switzerland) Fabio Leimer	Racing Engineering	1:39.427	—	1
2	1	(Sweden) Marcus Ericsson	DAMS	1:40.420	+0.993	2
3	9	(Brazil) Felipe Nasr	Carlin	1:40.520	+1.093	3
4	18	(Monaco) Stefano Coletti	Rapax	1:40.585	+1.158	4
5	12	(France) Tom Dillmann	Russian Time	1:40.689	+1.262	5
6	2	(Monaco) Stéphane Richelmi	DAMS	1:40.704	+1.277	6
7	15	(United States) Alexander Rossi	Caterham Racing	1:40.756	+1.329	7
8	26	(United Kingdom) Adrian Quaife-Hobbs	MP Motorsport	1:40.769	+1.342	8
9	11	(United Kingdom) Sam Bird	Russian Time	1:40.842	+1.415	9
10	22	(Netherlands) Robin Frijns	Hilmer Motorsport	1:40.865	+1.438	10
11	3	(United Kingdom) James Calado	ART Grand Prix	1:40.878	+1.451	21^{2}
12	19	(Switzerland) Simon Trummer	Rapax	1:40.892	+1.465	11
13	10	(United Kingdom) Jolyon Palmer	Carlin	1:41.033	+1.606	12
14	5	(Venezuela) Johnny Cecotto Jr.	Arden International	1:41.043	+1.616	13
15	4	(Germany) Daniel Abt	ART Grand Prix	1:41.070	+1.646	14
16	14	(Spain) Sergio Canamasas	Caterham Racing	1:41.229	+1.802	26^{2}
17	25	(Italy) Kevin Giovesi	Venezuela GP Lazarus	1:41.236	+1.809	19^{3}
18	6	(New Zealand) Mitch Evans	Arden International	1:41.237	+1.810	15
19	21	(Italy) Kevin Ceccon	Trident Racing	1:41.243	+1.816	16
20	7	(Colombia) Julián Leal	Racing Engineering	1:41.504	+2.077	17
21	24	(Austria) René Binder	Venezuela GP Lazarus	1:41.553	+2.126	18
22	16	(United States) Jake Rosenzweig	Barwa Addax Team	1:41.687	+2.260	20
23	20	(France) Nathanaël Berthon	Trident Racing	1:41.730	+2.303	22
24	23	(Norway) Pål Varhaug	Hilmer Motorsport	1:41.980	+2.553	23
25	17	(Indonesia) Rio Haryanto	Barwa Addax Team	1:41.981	+2.554	24
26	27	(Netherlands) Daniël de Jong	MP Motorsport	1:42.284	+2.857	25

Notes:

- ^1 — James Calado was demoted ten places on the grid for causing an accident at the previous round of the season in Sepang.
- ^2 — Kevin Giovesi was given a three-place grid penalty for blocking another competitor during qualifying.
- ^3 — Sergio Canamasas was moved to the back of the grid after race stewards ruled that he had deliberately attempted to force Kevin Ceccon off the circuit.

== Races ==
The first race was held over 170 km (110 mi) or 60 minutes (which ever came first) and all drivers were required by regulations to make one pit stop. The first ten finishers scored points, with two given to the fastest lap holder. The grid for the second race was determined by the finishing order of the first but the first eight drivers were in reverse order of where they finished. It was run for 120 km (75 mi) or 45 minutes (which ever came first). In contrast to the prior race drivers were not required to make pit stops. The top eight finishers earned points towards their respective championships.

=== Feature race ===
The first race commenced on 15:45 Arabia Standard Time (UTC+03:00) on 20 April. The weather at the start was dry and sunny with an air temperature of 33 °C (91 °F) and a track temperature of 41 °C (106 °F). Ericsson stalled on the grid while the field began the formation lap and had to begin from the pit lane. As the five red lights went out to begin the race, Leimer held off the fast-starting Coletti to lead the field in the opening sequence of corners. Coletti had forced Leimer to defend the lead at turn four and drew alongside through turns five and six but failed to overtake. Bird made a quick start, overtaking Rossi and Quaife-Hobbs on the centre of the circuit for third position. Palmer also made a fast getaway and ran in fifth place after passing Rossi on the main straight. De Jong became the first retirement after the first lap was over when he limped back to the pit lane. He was joined by Varhaug on lap five who had mechanical trouble.

Once the race had calmed down, Leimer was able to lead Coletti by two seconds by the start of lap five and set what was at that point the race's fastest lap. Both were also focused on ensuring their soft tyres lasted for as long as possible. The mandatory pit stops for the switch to the hard compound tyres began on the following lap when several drivers entered the pit lane. Quaife-Hobbs and Dillmann elected to run on an alternative strategy with the latter falling from fifth. During the pit stop sequence, Rossi re-passed Palmer and Frijns battled Leal for tenth and later Giovesi before his own stop. Canamasas was penalised for the second day running as the stewards imposed a drive-through penalty on him, deeming him to have deliberately forced Calado off the circuit. Bird and Nasr had slow pit stops and both drivers fell down the order. Leimer and Coletti made their stops from the top two at the end of the 10h lap and emerged ahead of those who had already made their pit stops.

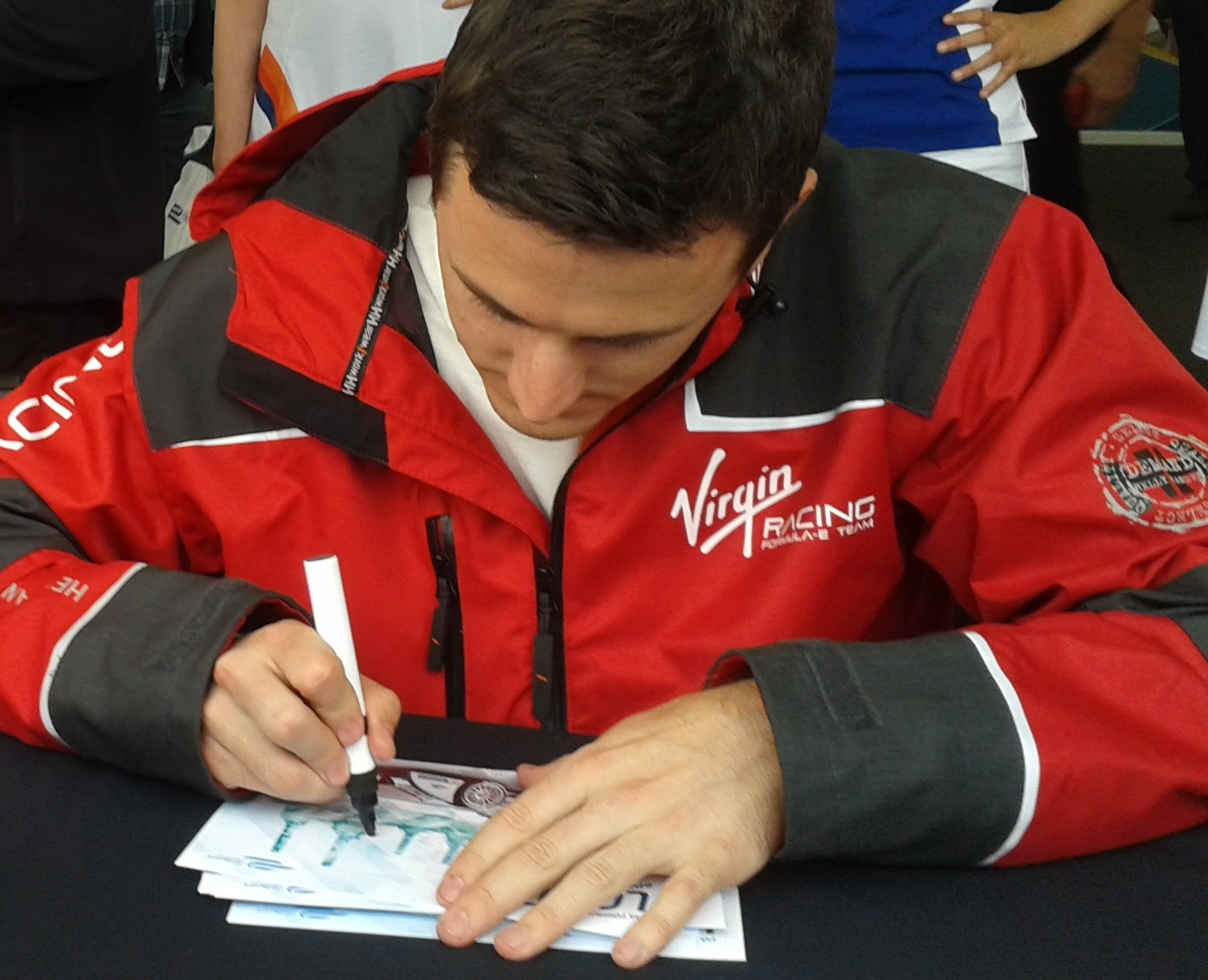
Fabio Leimer (pictured in 2015) held off Stefano Coletti in the first lap and maintained the lead to clinch his second victory of the season.

Leimer's advantage over Coletti had dwindled to 1.3 seconds but he regained some of that lead by overtaking the battling Evans and Giovesi at turn four. Coletti was then delayed by the same traffic jam and was three seconds adrift of Leimer. The yet-to-stop Quaife-Hobbs led and was followed by Dillmann, Leal and Giovesi. Dilmann made his pit stop on the 18th lap and Leal followed on the next lap; Leal stalled as he drove away from his pit box and required assistance from mechanics to restart his car. He subsequently received a penalty for pit lane over-speeding. On the 20th lap and having led the last ten laps, Quaife-Hobbs was the last driver to enter the pit lane and Leimer regained first. Quaife-Hobbs fell behind Dillmann but re-passed him after getting his tyres up to temperature. Frijns moved to the inside of Richelmi on lap 21 into turn one but went into the side of Richelmi's car, damaging his front wing. Frijns drove slowly to the pit lane for repairs but Richelmi had to abandon his damaged car on the circuit. Evans became the race's final retirement on the 25th lap when he stopped on a run-off area with smoke bellowing from his car due to debris penetrating the radiator and overheating the engine.

Attention focused on a battle for seventh between Quaife-Hobbs, Dillmann and Trummer, which saw Trummer passed by the other cars in quick succession on lap 28. Nasr passed teammate Palmer for fifth on lap 30. Leimer held the lead for the rest of the race to achieve his second victory of 2013 and the fourth of his career. Coletti followed 1.9 seconds later in second and Rossi took third. Off the podium, Nasr finished close behind Rossi in fourth place with his teammate Palmer in fifth. Bird slowed in the closing laps but held on to take sixth and fellow Brit Quaife-Hobbs was seventh. Dillmann came in eighth and secured the pole position for the sprint race. Trummer and Cecotto finished ninth and tenth. Outside the top ten, Ceccon finished eleventh having moved up six from his starting position and Calado came twelfth. Ericsson recovered from his formation lap stall to take 13th. Abt, Haryanto, Rosenzweig, Berthon, Binder, Leal, Canamasas and Frijns rounded out the 21 classified finishers.

=== Feature race classification ===
Drivers who scored championship points are denoted in bold.

Pos.	No.	Driver	Team	Laps	Time/Retired	Grid	Points
1	8	(Switzerland) **Fabio Leimer**	**Racing Engineering**	32	57:21.528	1	25 (4)
2	18	(Monaco) **Stefano Coletti**	**Rapax**	32	+1.929	4	18
3	15	(United States) **Alexander Rossi**	**Caterham Racing**	32	+9.030	7	15
4	9	(Brazil) **Felipe Nasr**	**Carlin**	32	+9.498	3	12
5	10	(United Kingdom) **Jolyon Palmer**	**Carlin**	32	+15.037	12	10
6	11	(United Kingdom) **Sam Bird**	**Russian Time**	32	+28.518	6	8
7	26	(United Kingdom) **Adrian Quaife-Hobbs**	**MP Motorsport**	32	+33.067	8	6
8	12	(France) **Tom Dillmann**	**Russian Time**	32	+33.589	5	4
9	19	(Switzerland) **Simon Trummer**	**Rapax**	32	+36.246	11	2
10	5	(Venezuela) **Johnny Cecotto Jr.**	**Arden International**	32	+37.459	13	1 (2)
11	21	(Italy) Kevin Ceccon	Trident Racing	32	+42.502	16	
12	3	(United Kingdom) James Calado	ART Grand Prix	32	+48.084	21	
13	1	(Sweden) Marcus Ericsson	DAMS	32	+48.709	2	
14	4	(Germany) Daniel Abt	ART Grand Prix	32	+53.482	14	
15	17	(Indonesia) Rio Haryanto	Barwa Addax Team	32	+59.146	24	
16	16	(United States) Jake Rosenzweig	Barwa Addax Team	32	+1:05.997	20	
17	20	(France) Nathanaël Berthon	Trident Racing	32	+1:10.696	22	
18	24	(Austria) René Binder	Venezuela GP Lazarus	32	+1:11.776	18	
19	7	(Colombia) Julián Leal	Racing Engineering	32	+1:19.886	17	
20	14	(Spain) Sergio Canamasas	Caterham Racing	32	+1:20.456	26	
21	22	(Netherlands) Robin Frijns	Hilmer Motorsport	31	+1 lap	10	
Ret	25	(Italy) Kevin Giovesi	Venezuela GP Lazarus	27	Retired	19	
Ret	6	(New Zealand) Mitch Evans	Arden International	25	engine	15	
Ret	2	(Monaco) Stéphane Richelmi	DAMS	20	Damage	6	
Ret	23	(Norway) Pål Varhaug	Hilmer Motorsport	4	Mechanical	23	
Ret	27	(Netherlands) Daniël de Jong	MP Motorsport	1	Retired	25	
Fastest lap: Johnny Cecotto Jr. (Arden International) — 1:45.115 (on lap 28)

=== Sprint race ===
The second race began at 10:50 local time on 21 April. The weather t the start were dry and sunny with an air temperature of 30 °C (86 °F) and a track temperature at 42 °C (108 °F). On the grid, pole position starter Dillmann made a clean getaway to hold off Quaife-Hobbs and keep the lead into the first corner. Quaife-Hobbs attempted to steer onto the inside but ran wide which contributed to some contact within the field. Coletti made a fast start and moved from seventh to third by driving on the outside at turn one. Bird initially got away from his starting position slowly but Quaife-Hobbs's blocked Coletti and allowed him into second place on the inside. Rossi was clipped by Nasr into the first corner, breaking Rossi's front wing. Leimer was on the inside into turn one and Rossi's nose cone made contact with the sidepod and the turning vane of Leimer's car. This affected Leimer for the rest of the event as debris was lodged in his car's sidepod. Haryanto and Ericsson both sustained damage after they hit each other and went to the pit lane before resuming.

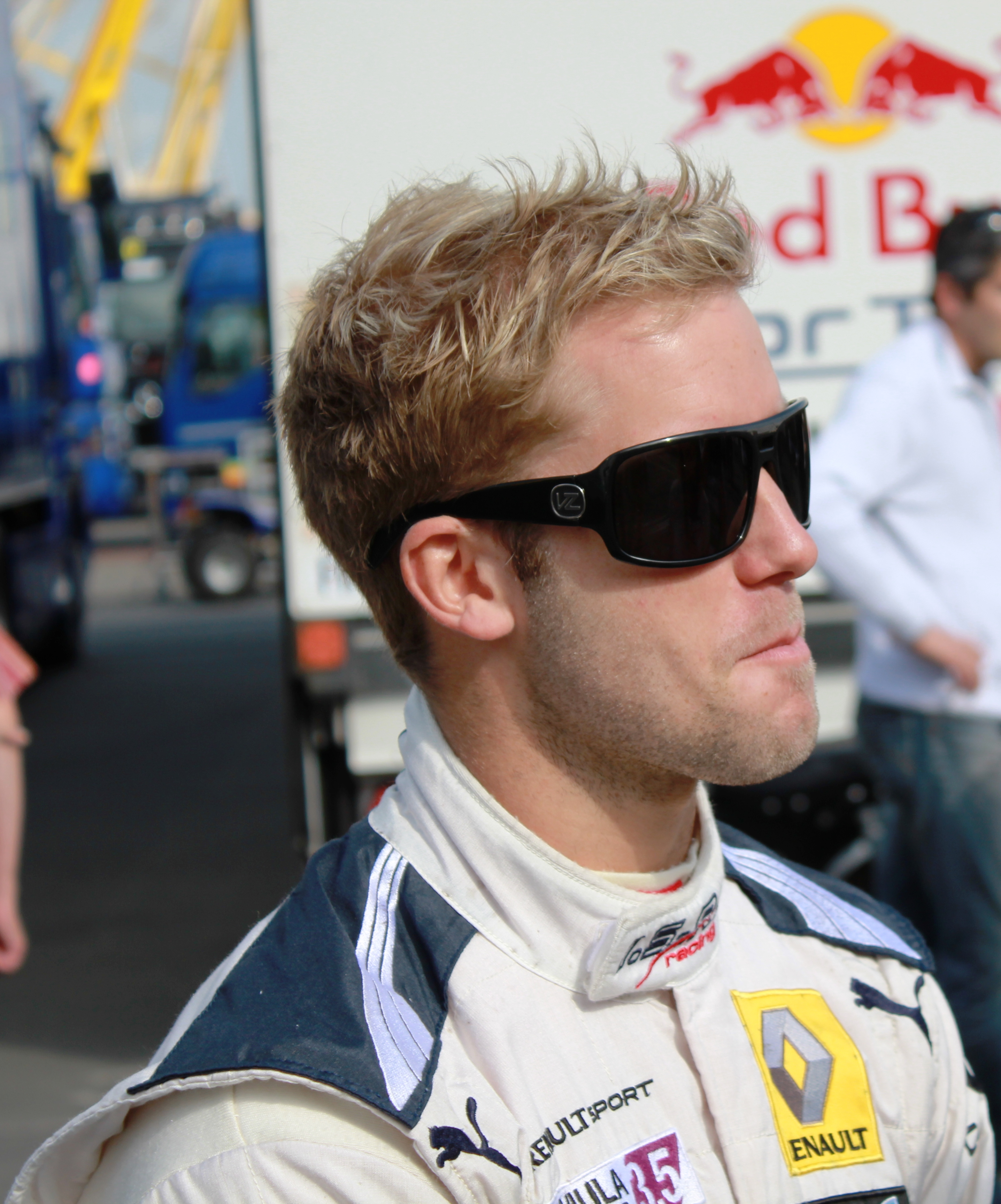
Sam Bird (pictured in 2012) took the lead on the second lap and held off Felipe Nasr to take Russian Time's first GP2 Series victory.

Bird drew close to teammate Dillmann and overtook him for the lead exiting the final corner. Dillmann fought back against Bird driving towards the first turn and the two went alongside each other. The two made minor contact in turns one and two, allowing Coletti to get a run on Dillmann and passed him for second. On the next lap, Nasr went to the inside of Dillmann into the first corner and took over third. Calado lost seventh to Palmer on lap four and withstood Abt, his teammate. The field settled down as drivers looked to conserve their tyres, and the top three pulled away from Dillmann. On the sixth lap, Bird came upon a large chunk of debris intto the first corner and locked his tyres trying to avoid running over it. Bird appeared to escape unhindered and the debris was removed by a trackside marshal. Further down the field, a battle for fifth place involved Quaife-Hobbs, Leimer and Palmer. By lap seven, one second covered the trio and Leimer looked for a way past Quaife-Hobbs but was cautious not to allow Palmer to take advantage of the situation. Further back, Berthon lost two positions after Evans and Leal overtook him.

The damage to Ericsson's car became too problematic for him and became the race's sole retirement at its midway point while Binder visited the pit lane twice, putting him a lap behind the leader. Tyres began to show signs of degradation during this period and more action was observed: Ceccon passed Rosenzweig for 11th and caught Cecotto. Canamasas battled with Trummer over who would be the first driver to pass the ailing Berthon who elected to make a pit stop for new tyres. Frijns appeared to falter and fell behind Richelmi, Evans and Leal in quick succession to 16th. Quaife-Hobbs was inexperienced in tyre management in GP2 and him delaying Leimer meant the latter came under pressure. On the 19th lap, Palmer overtook Leimer on the inside at turn one for sixth after the latter ran wide in an attempt to defend position. Calado followed through for seventh at the fourth corner. Quaife-Hobbs's tyres were heavily worn and fell to eighth position when Calado, Palmer and Abt overtook him.

As the race entered its final two laps, Coletti and Nasr gained on Bird whose tyres were worn out. The pressure on Bird was temporarily relieved when Coletti locked his tyres heading towards the tenth corner and then braked deep for the final turn. He overshot the corner and allowed Nasr through to second. Coletti appeared to have flat-spotted his tyres as a consequence and could not remain on the track and his chances for the victory were over. Nasr appeared to manage his tyre life better than other drivers and quickly drew close to Bird on the final lap and pulled alongside him under braking for the final turn. Bird went defensive and controlled the wheelspin in his tyres. Nasr got out of Bird's slipstream but could not pass Bird who held on to win the race. The margin of victory was 0.080 seconds, the closest in GP2 Series history. Coletti took third with a comfortable margin over Dillmann in fourth. Calado was fifth, Palmer sixth, Abt seventh and Quaife-Hobbs eighth. Leimer, Ceccon, Canamasas, Cecotto, Richelmi, Trummer, Evans, Leal, Giovesi, De Jong, Rosenzweig, Rossi, Varhaug, Berthon, Frijns, Haryanto and Binder were the final classified finishers. Bird's victory was the first for Russian Time after it took over ISport International.

=== Sprint race classification ===
Drivers who scored championship points are denoted in bold.

Pos.	No.	Driver	Team	Laps	Time/Retired	Grid	Points
1	11	(United Kingdom) **Sam Bird**	**Russian Time**	23	41:08.133	3	15 (2)
2	9	(Brazil) **Felipe Nasr**	**Carlin**	23	+0.080	5	12
3	18	(Monaco) **Stefano Coletti**	**Rapax**	23	+4.206	7	10
4	12	(France) **Tom Dillmann**	**Russian Time**	23	+10.328	1	8
5	3	(United Kingdom) **James Calado**	**ART Grand Prix**	23	+19.713	12	6
6	10	(United Kingdom) **Jolyon Palmer**	**Carlin**	23	+21.773	4	4
7	4	(Germany) **Daniel Abt**	**ART Grand Prix**	23	+24.108	14	2
8	26	(United Kingdom) **Adrian Quaife-Hobbs**	**MP Motorsport**	23	+27.722	2	1
9	8	(Switzerland) Fabio Leimer	Racing Engineering	23	+27.894	8	
10	21	(Italy) Kevin Ceccon	Trident Racing	23	+27.977	11	
11	14	(Spain) Sergio Canamasas	Caterham Racing	23	+28.601	20	
12	5	(Venezuela) Johnny Cecotto Jr.	Arden International	23	+35.477	10	
13	2	(Monaco) Stéphane Richelmi	DAMS	23	+35.858	24	
14	19	(Switzerland) Simon Trummer	Rapax	23	+36.346	9	
15	6	(New Zealand) Mitch Evans	Arden International	23	+36.950	23	
16	7	(Colombia) Julián Leal	Racing Engineering	23	+37.671	19	
17	25	(Italy) Kevin Giovesi	Venezuela GP Lazarus	23	+41.248	22	
18	27	(Netherlands) Daniël de Jong	MP Motorsport	23	+44.757	26	
19	16	(United States) Jake Rosenzweig	Barwa Addax Team	23	+47.006	16	
20	15	(United States) Alexander Rossi	Caterham Racing	23	+52.044	6	
21	23	(Norway) Pål Varhaug	Hilmer Motorsport	23	+54.740	25	
22	20	(France) Nathanaël Berthon	Trident Racing	23	+55.332	17	
23	22	(Netherlands) Robin Frijns	Hilmer Motorsport	23	+1:02.964	21	
24	17	(Indonesia) Rio Haryanto	Barwa Addax Team	23	+1:17.388	15	
25	24	(Austria) René Binder	Venezuela GP Lazarus	22	+1 Lap	18	
Ret	1	(Sweden) Marcus Ericsson	DAMS	5	Damage	13	
Fastest lap: Sam Bird (Russian Time) — 1:45.465 (on lap 4)

== Post-race ==
The top three drivers of both races appeared on the podium to collect their trophies and to participate later in a press conference. Leimer revealed his objective for the feature race was to execute a fast start but in spite of struggling which almost lost him a position to Coletti, declared himself "very happy" as he had waited for some time to achieve another victory in the GP2 Series. When asked if he was not worried about heavy overtaking and tyre management, he replied yes, "but I was much quicker than them so I was not using my tyres that much. It’s not the perfect situation for the tyres, but I still managed to save them." Coletti said he was happy with his team but felt he could have pushed harder earlier in the race due to the fear of wearing his tyres and decided to not take the risk. He commented that he did not inform his team he observed Leimer entering the pit lane on the same lap as him and believed he could have stayed on track for one additional lap. Rossi revealed his apprehension about how his tyres would behave and was uncertain on how to push it but was happy to finish third.

Bird said his victory in the sprint race felt "fantastic", "Being back in GP2 is already feeling very good, being back in the feeder series to Formula One is a great place to be. To win for RUSSIAN TIME after only four races of existence is a very good feeling." He believed that he may have pushed too hard in the wrong time of the race, "it was just a case of keeping it on the racing line and hoping they'd battle it out behind me. Felipe's car was like a rocket at the end. Big thanks to my new team: to win in our fourth race, with no pre-season testing, is amazing." Nasr spoke about car management and maintaining the pace levels with the leaders and believed he could have won in an alternative situation, adding, "But anyway, it’s still a good result. We came here to score big points and it’s quite good to go back to Europe knowing that we have a good car, a good team. It keeps getting better and better. I’m feeling quite confident." Coletti believed his third-place finish contributed towards "a good weekend" for himself and commented that entering the season's European leg leading in points had given him more motivation and hoped to compete at the front of the field in Barcelona, "We’re still a few points ahead – ten I think. But like I said, we need to score big points in Race 1 and I think that in Barcelona we’ll be in the front."

After the round, Coletti still led the Drivers' Championship but Leimer lowered his lead to one point less than it had been before the round. Nasr remained in third place on 48 points. After being in ninth beforehand, Bird moved to fourth position with 33 points while Calado fell to fifth on 24 points. Rapax kept the lead of Teams' Championship although their lead over Carlin was cut to two points. Racing Engineering's results dropped them to third while Russian Time were now in fourth having moved up from seventh. Arden International was fifth with nine rounds left in the season.

== Standings after the race ==
Drivers' Championship standings

+/–	Pos.	Driver	Points
	1	(Monaco) Stefano Coletti	64
	2	(Switzerland) Fabio Leimer	54
	3	(Brazil) Felipe Nasr	48
5	4	(United Kingdom) Sam Bird	33
1	5	(United Kingdom) James Calado	24

Teams' Championship standings

+/–	Pos.	Team	Points
	1	(Italy) Rapax	72
1	2	(United Kingdom) Carlin	70
1	3	(Spain) Racing Engineering	64
3	4	(Russia) Russian Time	45
1	5	(France) ART Grand Prix	26

- Note: Only the top five positions are included for both sets of standings.

Previous round: 2013 Sepang GP2 Series round	GP2 Series; 2013 season	Next round: 2013 Catalunya GP2 Series round
Previous round: 2012 Bahrain 2nd GP2 Series round	Bahrain GP2 round	Next round: 2014 Bahrain GP2 Series round
