= 2010 Auto GP Series =

Seasons
- ← 2009 2011 →

The 2010 Auto GP Series was the twelfth season of the former Euroseries 3000, and the first under its new name "Auto GP". The main sponsor of the series was PartyPoker.it. The series used the same 550 bhp (410 kW) Lola B05/52 chassis that the A1 Grand Prix series used between 2005 and 2008.

Despite missing the first two rounds of the season due to his commitments in the FIA GT1 World Championship, DAMS driver Romain Grosjean claimed the championship title, taking four victories and seven podiums in total from the eight races he contested. DAMS drivers also took second and third places in the championship standings, as consistent finishes for Edoardo Piscopo and Duncan Tappy – neither driver won any of the races held – helped them into their final placings. Five other drivers took race victories over the season, with Carlos Iaconelli taking three – all in sprint races – but poor placings in the championship's feature races restricted him to only seventh place; Luca Filippi took two, with single victories each for Adrien Tambay, Julián Leal and Vladimir Arabadzhiev.

== Teams and drivers ==
Team	No.	Driver	Rounds
(France) DAMS	1	(United Kingdom) Duncan Tappy	All
(France) DAMS	2	(Bulgaria) Vladimir Arabadzhiev	1
(France) DAMS	2	(Italy) Fabrizio Crestani	2
(France) DAMS	2	(France) Romain Grosjean	3–6
(France) DAMS	3	(Italy) Edoardo Piscopo	All
(Czech Republic) Charouz-Gravity Racing	4	(Czech Republic) Tomáš Kostka	1
(Czech Republic) Charouz-Gravity Racing	4	(Monaco) Stefano Coletti	2
(Czech Republic) Charouz-Gravity Racing	4	(Switzerland) Natacha Gachnang	3, 5–6
(Czech Republic) Charouz-Gravity Racing	4	(Argentina) Esteban Guerrieri	4
(Czech Republic) Charouz-Gravity Racing	5	(Austria) Walter Grubmüller	1–3
(Czech Republic) Charouz-Gravity Racing	5	(United Kingdom) Alexander Sims	5–6
(Czech Republic) Charouz-Gravity Racing	6	(Czech Republic) Jan Charouz	All
(Czech Republic) Charouz-Gravity Racing	7	(France) Adrien Tambay	All
(United Kingdom) Super Nova Racing	8	(New Zealand) Jonny Reid	All
(United Kingdom) Super Nova Racing	9	(Italy) Giorgio Pantano	1–3
(United Kingdom) Super Nova Racing	9	(United States) Jake Rosenzweig	4
(United Kingdom) Super Nova Racing	9	(Italy) Luca Filippi	5–6
(Italy) Trident Racing	10	(Colombia) Julián Leal	All
(Italy) Trident Racing	11	(South Africa) Adrian Zaugg	1
(Italy) Trident Racing	11	(Italy) Federico Leo	2, 6
(Italy) Trident Racing	11	(Italy) Fabrizio Crestani	3–4
(Italy) RP Motorsport	12	(Spain) Celso Míguez	1–4
(Italy) RP Motorsport	12	(Italy) Giacomo Ricci	5
(Italy) RP Motorsport	12	(Italy) Davide Valsecchi	6
(Italy) RP Motorsport	14	(Italy) Stefano Bizzarri	All
(Italy) Team Lazarus	15	(Italy) Fabio Onidi	All
(Italy) Euronova Racing	19	(Italy) Luca Filippi	1–3
(Italy) Euronova Racing	19	(Italy) Giorgio Pantano	4
(Italy) Durango	20	(Italy) Giuseppe Cipriani	6
(Italy) Durango	21	(Brazil) Carlos Iaconelli	All
(Italy) Ombra Racing	22	(Italy) Giorgio Pantano	6

== Race calendar and results ==
All rounds were part of the International GT Open weekends, excepting stand-alone round at Brno and Navarra round that supported Spanish GT Championship event.

Round		Circuit	Date	Pole position	Fastest lap	Winning driver	Winning team
1	R1	(Czech Republic) Masaryk Circuit, Brno	24 April	(New Zealand) Jonny Reid	(Italy) Luca Filippi	(Italy) Luca Filippi	(Italy) Euronova Racing
1	R2	(Czech Republic) Masaryk Circuit, Brno	25 April		(Italy) Luca Filippi	(Bulgaria) Vladimir Arabadzhiev	(France) DAMS
2	R1	(Italy) Autodromo Enzo e Dino Ferrari, Imola	22 May	(Italy) Luca Filippi	(Italy) Giorgio Pantano	(France) Adrien Tambay	(Czech Republic) Charouz-Gravity Racing
2	R2	(Italy) Autodromo Enzo e Dino Ferrari, Imola	23 May		(Brazil) Carlos Iaconelli	(Brazil) Carlos Iaconelli	(Italy) Durango
3	R1	(Belgium) Circuit de Spa-Francorchamps	26 June	(France) Romain Grosjean	(France) Romain Grosjean	(France) Romain Grosjean	(France) DAMS
3	R2	(Belgium) Circuit de Spa-Francorchamps	27 June		(France) Romain Grosjean	(Brazil) Carlos Iaconelli	(Italy) Durango
4	R1	(France) Circuit de Nevers Magny-Cours	10 July	(France) Romain Grosjean	(France) Romain Grosjean	(France) Romain Grosjean	(France) DAMS
4	R2	(France) Circuit de Nevers Magny-Cours	11 July		(France) Adrien Tambay	(Brazil) Carlos Iaconelli	(Italy) Durango
5	R1	(Spain) Circuito de Navarra, Los Arcos	25 September	(Colombia) Julián Leal	(Colombia) Julián Leal	(Colombia) Julián Leal	(Italy) Trident Racing
5	R2	(Spain) Circuito de Navarra, Los Arcos	26 September		(Italy) Edoardo Piscopo	(France) Romain Grosjean	(France) DAMS
6	R1	(Italy) Autodromo Nazionale Monza	2 October	(France) Romain Grosjean	(France) Romain Grosjean	(France) Romain Grosjean	(France) DAMS
6	R2	(Italy) Autodromo Nazionale Monza	3 October		(Italy) Luca Filippi	(Italy) Luca Filippi	(United Kingdom) Super Nova Racing

== Championship standings ==
- Points for both championships were awarded as follows:

Race
Position	1st	2nd	3rd	4th	5th	6th	7th	8th
**Race One**	10	8	6	5	4	3	2	1
**Race Two**	6	5	4	3	2	1		

In addition:

- One point will be awarded for Pole position for Race One
- One point will be awarded for fastest lap in each race

=== Drivers' standings ===
Pos	Driver	BRN (Czech Republic)		IMO (Italy)		SPA (Belgium)		MAG (France)		NAV (Spain)		MNZ (Italy)		Points
1	(France) Romain Grosjean					**1**	2	**1**	Ret	3	1	**1**	3	58
2	(Italy) Edoardo Piscopo	2	3	2	Ret	6	4	7	3	2	10	10	6	42
3	(United Kingdom) Duncan Tappy	5	11	4	3	Ret	9	2	4	4	4	4	11	37
4	(Czech Republic) Jan Charouz	4	6	Ret	6	5	3	5	2	9	3	6	2	36
5	(Italy) Luca Filippi	1	13	**12**	Ret	2	5			7	Ret	7	1	34
6	(France) Adrien Tambay	6	Ret	1	4	Ret	10	14	10	Ret	5	2	5	29
7	(Brazil) Carlos Iaconelli	Ret	8	6	1	8	1	8	1	DSQ	9	13	Ret	24
8	(Italy) Fabio Onidi	3	Ret	3	Ret	9	12	3	Ret	12	8	3	9	24
9	(Colombia) Julián Leal	10	4	Ret	8	7	Ret	9	7	**1**	Ret	8	4	21
10	(New Zealand) Jonny Reid	**13**	7	5	Ret	4	7	10	6	5	6	Ret	14	16
11	(Bulgaria) Vladimir Arabadzhiev	7	1											8
12	(Italy) Giacomo Ricci									6	2			8
13	(Italy) Giorgio Pantano	Ret	9	11	9	3	6	13	11			12	Ret	8
14	(Spain) Celso Míguez	11	10	8	2	10	Ret	11	8					6
15	(South Africa) Adrian Zaugg	8	2											6
16	(Italy) Federico Leo			9	5							5	7	6
17	(United States) Jake Rosenzweig							4	12					5
18	(Argentina) Esteban Guerrieri							6	5					5
19	(Austria) Walter Grubmüller	9	5	Ret	Ret	DNS	DNS							2
20	(Monaco) Stefano Coletti			7	Ret									2
21	(Switzerland) Natacha Gachnang					12	11			8	7	15	10	1
22	(Italy) Fabrizio Crestani			Ret	7	11	8	DNS	DNS					0
23	(Italy) Davide Valsecchi											11	8	0
24	(Italy) Stefano Bizzarri	12	12	10	10	13	Ret	12	9	10	11	14	12	0
25	(United Kingdom) Alexander Sims									11	Ret	9	15	0
26	(Italy) Giuseppe Cipriani											16	13	0
	(Czech Republic) Tomáš Kostka	DNS	DNS											0
Pos	Driver	BRN (Czech Republic)		IMO (Italy)		SPA (Belgium)		MAG (France)		NAV (Spain)		MNZ (Italy)		Points

Colour	Result
Gold	Winner
Silver	Second place
Bronze	Third place
Green	Points classification
Blue	Non-points classification
Blue	Non-classified finish (NC)
Purple	Retired, not classified (Ret)
Red	Did not qualify (DNQ)
Red	Did not pre-qualify (DNPQ)
Black	Disqualified (DSQ)
White	Did not start (DNS)
White	Withdrew (WD)
White	Race cancelled (C)
Blank	Did not practice (DNP)
Blank	Did not arrive (DNA)
Blank	Excluded (EX)

**Bold** – Pole for Race One
Italics – Fastest Lap

=== Teams' standings ===
Pos	Team	BRN (Czech Republic)		IMO (Italy)		SPA (Belgium)		MAG (France)		NAV (Spain)		MNZ (Italy)		Points
1	(France) DAMS	2	1	2	3	**1**	2	**1**	3	2	1	**1**	3	135
1	(France) DAMS	5	3	4	7	6	4	2	4	3	4	4	6	135
2	(Czech Republic) Charouz-Gravity Racing	4	5	1	4	5	3	5	2	8	3	2	2	74
2	(Czech Republic) Charouz-Gravity Racing	6	6	7	6	12	10	6	5	9	5	6	5	74
3	(United Kingdom) Super Nova Racing	**13**	7	5	9	3	6	4	6	5	6	7	1	40
3	(United Kingdom) Super Nova Racing	Ret	9	11	Ret	4	7	10	12	7	Ret	Ret	14	40
4	(Italy) Trident Racing	8	2	9	5	7	8	9	7	**1**	Ret	5	4	33
4	(Italy) Trident Racing	10	4	Ret	8	11	Ret	DNS	DNS			8	7	33
5	(Italy) Durango	Ret	8	6	1	8	1	8	1	DSQ	9	13	13	24
5	(Italy) Durango											16	Ret	24
6	(Italy) Team Lazarus	3	Ret	3	Ret	9	12	3	Ret	12	8	3	9	24
7	(Italy) Euronova Racing	1	13	**12**	Ret	2	5	13	11					23
8	(Italy) RP Motorsport	11	10	8	2	10	Ret	11	8	6	2	11	8	14
8	(Italy) RP Motorsport	12	12	10	10	13	Ret	12	9	10	11	14	12	14
9	(Italy) Ombra Racing											12	Ret	0
Pos	Team	BRN (Czech Republic)		IMO (Italy)		SPA (Belgium)		MAG (France)		NAV (Spain)		MNZ (Italy)		Points
