= 2014 Silverstone GP2 Series round =

2014 GP2 race held in the United Kingdom

(United Kingdom) 2014 Silverstone GP2 round
Round details
- Round 5 of 12 rounds in the 2014 GP2 Series
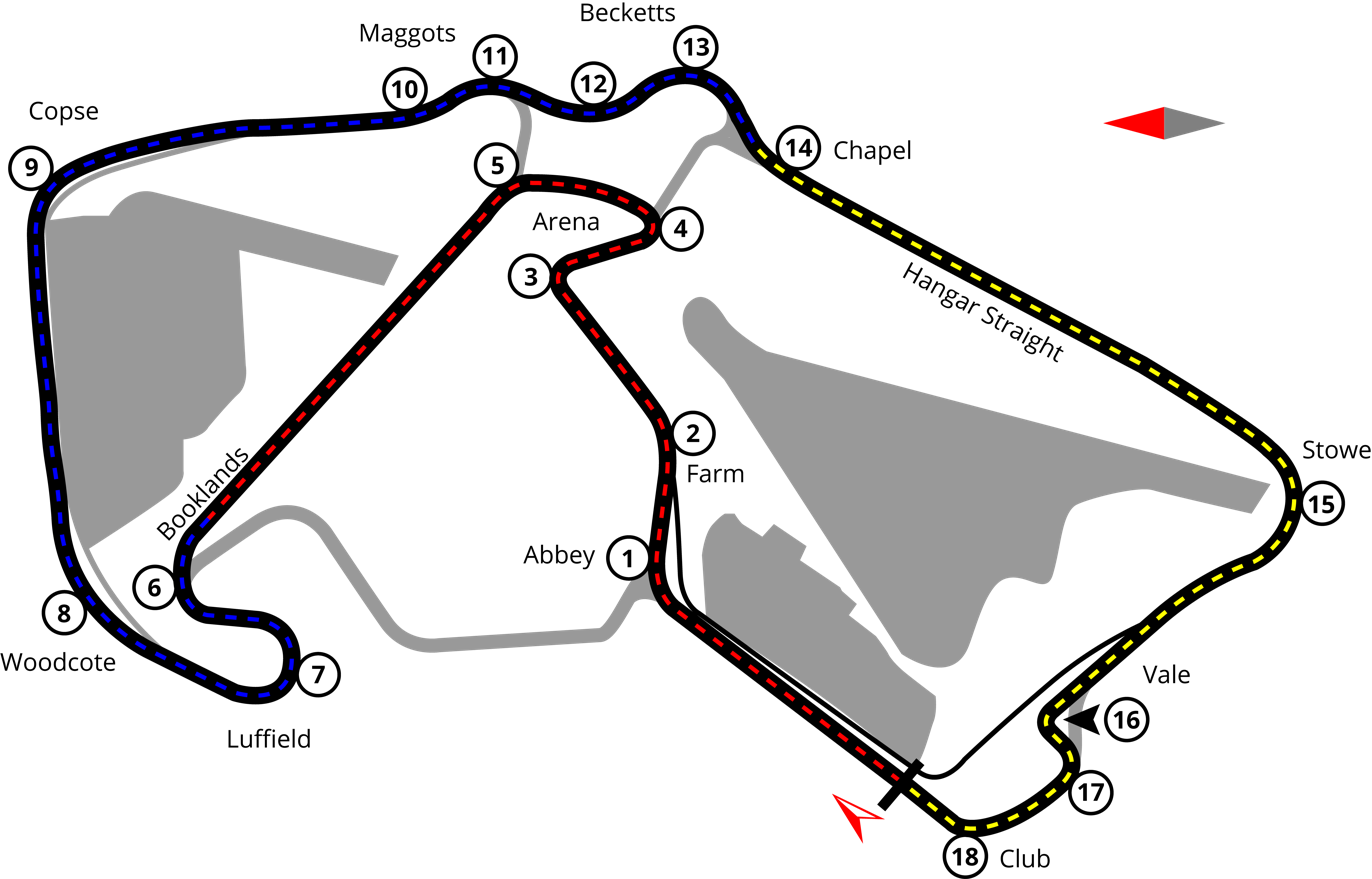
- Layout of the Silverstone Circuit
- Location: Silverstone Circuit; Silverstone, United Kingdom
- Course: Permanent racing facility 5.891 km (3.660 mi)

GP2 Series

Feature race
- Date: 5 July 2014
- Laps: 29

Pole position
Driver	(Italy) Raffaele Marciello	Racing Engineering
- Time: 1:40.445

Podium
First	(New Zealand) Mitch Evans	RT Russian Time
Second	(United Kingdom) Jolyon Palmer	DAMS
Third	(Belgium) Stoffel Vandoorne	ART Grand Prix

Fastest lap
Driver	(New Zealand) Mitch Evans	RT Russian Time
- Time: 1:42.297 (on lap 22)

Sprint race
- Date: 6 July 2014
- Laps: 21

Podium
First	(Brazil) Felipe Nasr	Carlin
Second	(Monaco) Stefano Coletti	Racing Engineering
Third	(Venezuela) Johnny Cecotto Jr.	Trident Racing

Fastest lap
Driver	(Monaco) Stefano Coletti	Racing Engineering
- Time: 1:42.460 (on lap 6)

The 2014 Silverstone GP2 Series round was a pair of motor races held on 5 and 6 July 2014 at the Silverstone Circuit in Silverstone, United Kingdom as part of the GP2 Series. It is the fifth round of the 2014 season. The race weekend supported the 2014 British Grand Prix.

== Classification ==
=== Qualifying ===
Pos.	No.	Driver	Team	Time	Grid
1	5	(Italy) Raffaele Marciello	Racing Engineering	1:40.445	1
2	7	(United Kingdom) Jolyon Palmer	DAMS	1:40.472	2
3	1	(New Zealand) Mitch Evans	RT Russian Time	1:40.478	3
4	4	(Colombia) Julián Leal	Carlin	1:40.484	4
5	10	(Belgium) Stoffel Vandoorne	ART Grand Prix	1:40.646	5
6	3	(Brazil) Felipe Nasr	Carlin	1:40.658	6
7	21	(Denmark) Marco Sørensen	MP Motorsport	1:40.658	7
8	8	(Monaco) Stéphane Richelmi	DAMS	1:40.762	8
9	23	(Venezuela) Johnny Cecotto Jr.	Trident Racing	1:40.845	9
10	11	(Germany) Daniel Abt	Hilmer Motorsport	1:40.880	10
11	6	(Monaco) Stefano Coletti	Racing Engineering	1:40.885	11
12	26	(France) Arthur Pic	Campos Racing	1:40.961	12
13	15	(Switzerland) Simon Trummer	Rapax	1:41.064	13
14	18	(Indonesia) Rio Haryanto	EQ8 Caterham Racing	1:41.166	14
15	22	(Spain) Sergio Canamasas	Trident Racing	1:41.196	15
16	19	(United States) Alexander Rossi	EQ8 Caterham Racing	1:41.235	16
17	14	(United Kingdom) Adrian Quaife-Hobbs	Rapax	1:41.252	17
18	20	(Netherlands) Daniël de Jong	MP Motorsport	1:41.330	18
19	24	(France) Nathanaël Berthon	Venezuela GP Lazarus	1:41.362	19
20	12	(United Kingdom) Jon Lancaster	Hilmer Motorsport	1:41.362	20
21	25	(United States) Conor Daly	Venezuela GP Lazarus	1:41.556	21
22	27	(Japan) Kimiya Sato	Campos Racing	1:41.686	22
23	17	(Brazil) André Negrão	Arden International	1:41.908	23
24	9	(Japan) Takuya Izawa	ART Grand Prix	1:42.003	24
25	16	(Austria) René Binder	Arden International	1:42.373	25
26	2	(Russia) Artem Markelov	RT Russian Time	1:42.724	26
Source: Qual.

=== Feature race ===
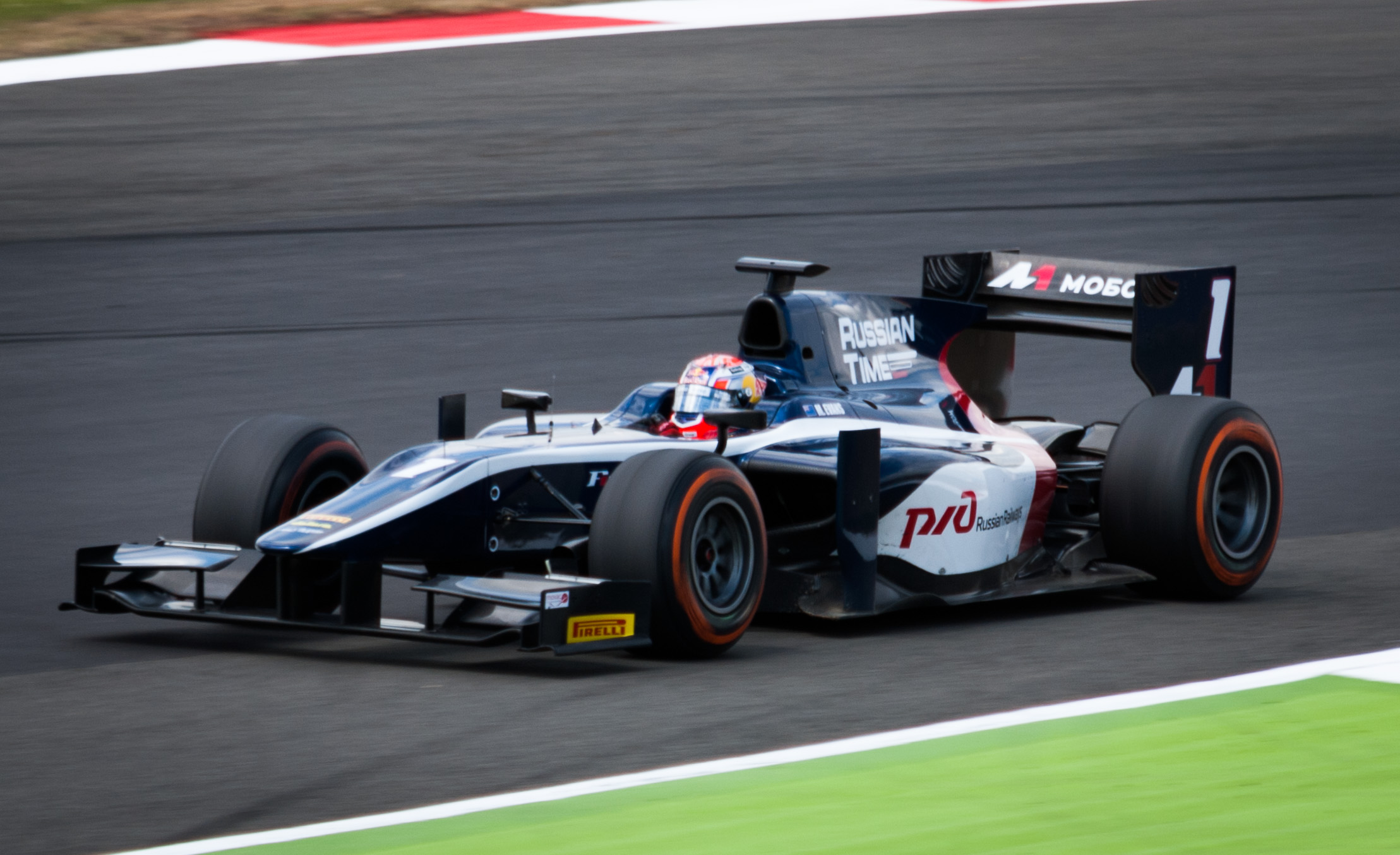
Mitch Evans

Pos.	No.	Driver	Team	Laps	Time/Retired	Grid	Points
1	1	(New Zealand) Mitch Evans	RT Russian Time	29	50:56.307	3	27 (25+2)
2	7	(United Kingdom) Jolyon Palmer	DAMS	29	+4.941	2	18
3	10	(Belgium) Stoffel Vandoorne	ART Grand Prix	29	+25.680	5	15
4	6	(Monaco) Stefano Coletti	Racing Engineering	29	+32.077	11	12
5	4	(Colombia) Julián Leal	Carlin	29	+31.912	4	10
6	23	(Venezuela) Johnny Cecotto Jr.	Trident Racing	29	+32.225	9	8
7	3	(Brazil) Felipe Nasr	Carlin	29	+32.977	7	6
8	8	(Monaco) Stéphane Richelmi	DAMS	29	+34.849	8	4
9	21	(Denmark) Marco Sørensen	MP Motorsport	29	+35.055	7	2
10	11	(Germany) Daniel Abt	Hilmer Motorsport	29	+40.275	10	1
11	26	(France) Arthur Pic	Campos Racing	29	+43.017	12	
12	19	(United States) Alexander Rossi	EQ8 Caterham Racing	29	+44.568	16	
13	14	(United Kingdom) Adrian Quaife-Hobbs	Rapax	29	+45.715	17	
14	25	(United States) Conor Daly	Venezuela GP Lazarus	29	+47.455	21	
15	22	(Spain) Sergio Canamasas	Trident Racing	29	+49.565	15	
16	9	(Japan) Takuya Izawa	ART Grand Prix	29	+56.175	24	
17	24	(France) Nathanaël Berthon	Venezuela GP Lazarus	29	+57.811	19	
18	2	(Russia) Artem Markelov	RT Russian Time	29	+1:00.948	26	
19	20	(Netherlands) Daniël de Jong	MP Motorsport	29	+1:01.667	18	
20	17	(Brazil) André Negrão	Arden International	29	+1:03.906	23	
21	18	(Indonesia) Rio Haryanto	EQ8 Caterham Racing	29	+1:04.778	14	
22	23	(United Kingdom) Jon Lancaster	Hilmer Motorsport	29	+1:05.083	20	
23	27	(Japan) Kimiya Sato	Campos Racing	29	+1:18.405	22	
24	16	(Austria) René Binder	Arden International	27	+2 laps	25	
25	15	(Switzerland) Simon Trummer	Rapax	26	+3 laps	13	
Ret	5	(Italy) Raffaele Marciello	Racing Engineering	14	Did not finish	1	4 (0+4)
Fastest lap: Mitch Evans (RT Russian Time) — 1:42.297 (on lap 22)
Source: Feat.

=== Sprint race ===
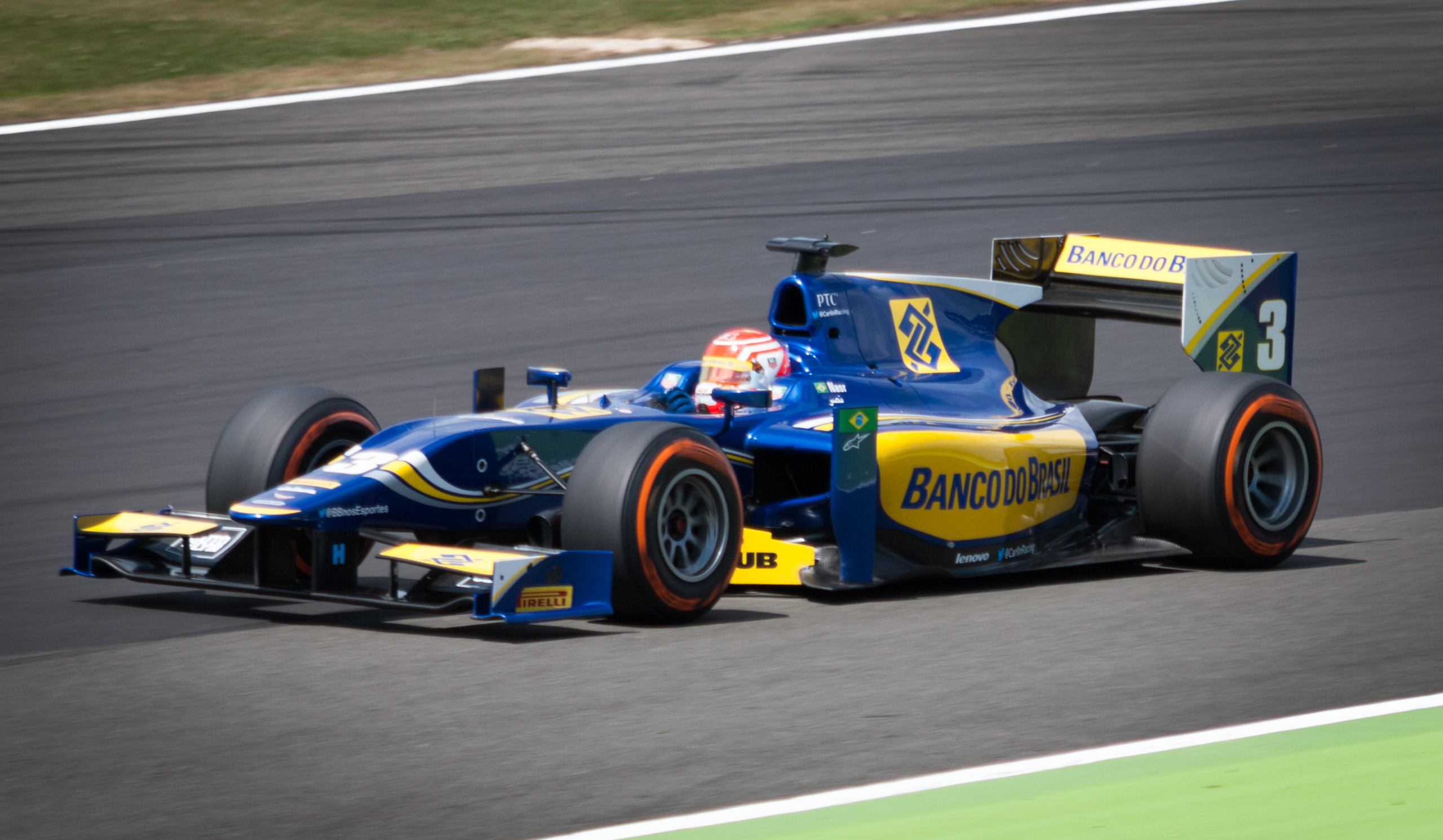
Felipe Nasr

Pos.	No.	Driver	Team	Laps	Time/Retired	Grid	Points
1	3	(Brazil) Felipe Nasr	Carlin	21	36:12.279	2	15
2	6	(Monaco) Stefano Coletti	Racing Engineering	21	+4.384	5	14 (12+2)
3	23	(Venezuela) Johnny Cecotto Jr.	Trident Racing	21	+5.684	3	10
4	7	(United Kingdom) Jolyon Palmer	DAMS	21	+6.558	7	8
5	4	(Colombia) Julián Leal	Carlin	21	+9.116	4	6
6	8	(Monaco) Stéphane Richelmi	DAMS	21	+12.275	1	4
7	1	(New Zealand) Mitch Evans	RT Russian Time	21	+12.657	8	2
8	21	(Denmark) Marco Sørensen	MP Motorsport	21	+14.966	9	1
9	10	(Belgium) Stoffel Vandoorne	ART Grand Prix	21	+19.198	6	
10	25	(United States) Conor Daly	Venezuela GP Lazarus	21	+22.047	14	
11	11	(Germany) Daniel Abt	Hilmer Motorsport	21	+22.751	10	
12	24	(France) Nathanaël Berthon	Venezuela GP Lazarus	21	+32.896	17	
13	23	(United Kingdom) Jon Lancaster	Hilmer Motorsport	21	+39.002	22	
14	20	(Netherlands) Daniël de Jong	MP Motorsport	21	+39.553	19	
15	14	(United Kingdom) Adrian Quaife-Hobbs	Rapax	21	+39.968	13	
16	17	(Brazil) André Negrão	Arden International	21	+41.043	20	
17	2	(Russia) Artem Markelov	RT Russian Time	21	+48.382	18	
18	15	(Switzerland) Simon Trummer	Rapax	21	+49.571	25	
19	16	(Austria) René Binder	Arden International	21	+49.837	24	
20	27	(Japan) Kimiya Sato	Campos Racing	21	+53.072	23	
21	19	(United States) Alexander Rossi	EQ8 Caterham Racing	20	+1 lap	12	
Ret	26	(France) Arthur Pic	Campos Racing	19	Did not finish	11	
Ret	9	(Japan) Takuya Izawa	ART Grand Prix	19	Did not finish	16	
Ret	22	(Spain) Sergio Canamasas	Trident Racing	9	Did not finish	15	
Ret	18	(Indonesia) Rio Haryanto	EQ8 Caterham Racing	7	Did not finish	21	
Ret	5	(Italy) Raffaele Marciello	Racing Engineering	0	Did not finish	26	
Fastest lap: Stefano Coletti (Racing Engineering) — 1:42.460 (on lap 6)
Source: Sprint

== See also ==
- 2014 British Grand Prix
- 2014 Silverstone GP3 Series round

Previous round: 2014 Red Bull Ring GP2 Series round	GP2 Series; 2014 season	Next round: 2014 Hockenheimring GP2 Series round
Previous round: 2013 Silverstone GP2 Series round	Silverstone GP2 round	Next round: 2015 Silverstone GP2 Series round
