= 2014 Spa-Francorchamps GP2 Series round =

(Belgium) 2014 Belgian GP2 round
Round details
- Round 8 of 11 rounds in the 2014 GP2 Series
- Location: Circuit de Spa-Francorchamps, Francorchamps, Belgium
- Course: Permanent racing facility 7.004 km (4.352 mi)

GP2 Series

Feature race
- Date: 23 August 2014
- Laps: 25

Pole position
Driver	(Belgium) Stoffel Vandoorne	ART Grand Prix
- Time: 1:56.839

Podium
First	(Italy) Raffaele Marciello	Racing Engineering
Second	(Belgium) Stoffel Vandoorne	ART Grand Prix
Third	(Venezuela) Johnny Cecotto Jr.	Trident Racing

Fastest lap
Driver	(Italy) Raffaele Marciello	Racing Engineering
- Time: 2:16.422 (on lap 21)

Sprint race
- Date: 24 August 2014
- Laps: 18

Podium
First	(Brazil) Felipe Nasr	Carlin
Second	(Venezuela) Johnny Cecotto Jr.	Trident Racing
Third	(United Kingdom) Jolyon Palmer	DAMS

Fastest lap
Driver	(United Kingdom) Adrian Quaife-Hobbs	Rapax
- Time: 1:58.432 (on lap 13)

The 2014 Belgium GP2 Series round was a GP2 Series motor race held on August 23 and 24, 2014 at the Circuit de Spa-Francorchamps in Belgium. It was the eighth round of the 2014 GP2 Season. The race weekend supported the 2014 Belgian Grand Prix.

== See also ==
- 2014 Belgian Grand Prix
- 2014 Spa-Francorchamps GP3 Series round

Previous round: 2014 Hungaroring GP2 Series round	GP2 Series; 2014 season	Next round: 2014 Monza GP2 Series round
Previous round: 2013 Spa-Francorchamps GP2 Series round	GP2 Spa-Francorchamps round	Next round: 2015 Spa-Francorchamps GP2 Series round
