= Fabio Onidi =

Italian racing driver

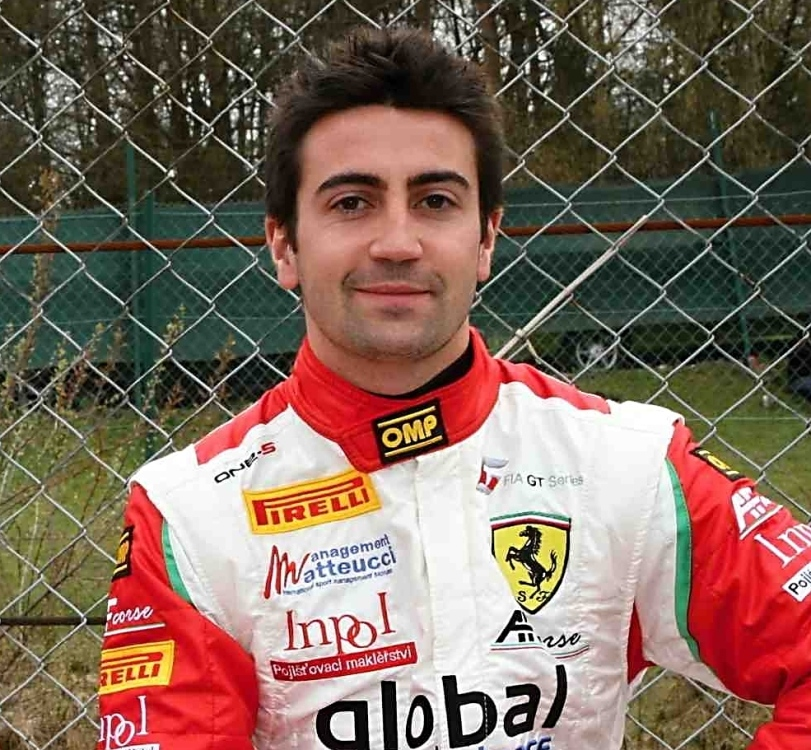
- Nationality: (Italy) Italian
- Born: 9 March 1988 (age 38) Milan, Italy

Blancpain Sprint Series career
- Debut season: 2014
- Current team: Bhaitech
- Categorisation: FIA Gold (2013); FIA Silver (2014–)
- Car number: 60
- Starts: 14
- Wins: 0
- Poles: 0
- Fastest laps: 0
- Best finish: 14th in 2014

Previous series
- 2012 2008–2011 2008–09 2008 2007 2007 2007 2005–06 2004–05: GP2 Series; Auto GP; A1 Grand Prix; Radical European Masters; Italian Formula Renault 2.0; Eurocup Formula Renault 2.0; Formula Renault 2.0 NEC; British Formula Renault 2.0; Formula BMW ADAC

Fabio Onidi (born 9 March 1988 in Milan) is an Itatian former professional racing driver.

== Career ==
=== Karting ===
Prior to starting his racing career, Onidi raced in karting for a number of years, finishing sixth in the European Championship ICA Junior category and winning the Italian Championship ICA Junior title in 2003.

=== Formula BMW ===
Onidi began his single–seater career in 2004 in the Formula BMW ADAC series, as one of former Formula One driver Sebastian Vettel's team–mates at ADAC Berlin-Brandenburg e.V. He finished his debut season in eighth place with the highlight being a Pole position at Brno. He continued in the championship in 2005, switching to the Eifelland Racing team. He finished the season in 11th place despite missing three races during the year. Onidi also took part in the end–of–season Formula BMW World Final, held at the Bahrain International Circuit, but he retired from the event.

=== Formula Renault 2.0 ===
At the end of 2005, Onidi joined Fortec Motorsport to contest the British Formula Renault 2.0 Winter Series. He scored 20 points in the four races to finish 17th in the standings. He continued with the team into the main championship in 2006, finishing the season as the best rookie driver in 11th place.

In 2007, Onidi joined the Motorsport Arena team to contest both the Eurocup Formula Renault 2.0 and Formula Renault 2.0 Northern European Cup. He took a best finish of eighth place to finish 20th in the Eurocup standings, whilst in the Northern European Cup, he took podium places at both Zandvoort and Nürburgring to finish ninth in the championship, despite missing the last six races of the season.

In November 2007, Onidi took part in the four race Italian Formula Renault 2.0 Winter Series with RP Motorsport, taking two podiums to finish third in the standings. He finished level on points with the Cram Competition entry of Daniel Zampieri, but lost out on countback.

=== Euroseries 3000/Auto GP ===
For 2008, Onidi moved up to the Euroseries 3000 championship with the GP Racing team. He won his debut race at Vallelunga and took a second victory at Valencia later in the season to finish runner–up in the championship behind Nicolas Prost. In the accompanying Italian Formula 3000 series, he also ended the year as runner–up, finishing a single point behind Durango's Colombian driver Omar Leal.

Onidi remained in the championship in 2009, moving to fellow Italian team Fisichella Motor Sport to partner Rodolfo González. He again took two victories during the season, at Portimão and Vallelunga, but despite leading the championship heading into the final round at Monza, he finished third in the standings, behind Marco Bonanomi and eventual champion Will Bratt.

Onidi continued in the series for a third season in 2010, when the championship was re–branded as Auto GP. He raced for Team Lazarus in a single–car team. After taking a podium at the first event in Brno, Onidi added a further three podium positions to finish the season in eighth place, level on points with Carlos Iaconelli, who took seventh place due to his three race wins. He remained with Lazarus for the 2011 and was joined by compatriot Fabrizio Crestani; the two proved evenly matched, finishing fifth and sixth in the championship with Onidi seven points ahead.

=== A1 Grand Prix ===
Onidi made his A1 Grand Prix debut in October 2008, racing for A1 Team Italy at the first round of the 2008–09 season at Zandvoort in the Netherlands. Despite treacherous weather conditions, he finished seventh in the sprint race, although he retired from the feature race after a collision with the A1 Team South Africa car of Adrian Zaugg.

=== GP2 Series ===
In the autumn of 2008, Onidi took part in GP2 Series testing at Paul Ricard, testing for BCN Competición, Piquet GP and Super Nova Racing, and a year later he tested for Coloni Motorsport at Jerez. He made his GP2 racing début in the non-championship 2011 season finale with the Super Nova team alongside Giacomo Ricci, and switched to the category full-time for the 2012 season with the Coloni team, where he was paired with Stefano Coletti. He finished 20th in the final championship standings.

=== Other series ===
In April 2010, Onidi drove for Tech 1 Racing in the final GP3 Series pre–season test held at the Circuit de Catalunya, and in October 2010 he sampled a Formula Renault 3.5 Series car for the first time, testing for Fortec Motorsport and ISR Racing at Motorland Aragón.

== Racing record ==
=== Career summary ===
Season	Series	Team	Races	Wins	Poles	F/Laps	Podiums	Points	Position
2004	Formula BMW ADAC	ADAC Berlin-Brandenburg e.V.	20	0	1	0	0	54	8th
2005	Formula BMW ADAC	Eifelland Racing	17	0	0	1	0	48	11th
2005	British Formula Renault 2.0 - Winter Series	Fortec Motorsport	4	0	0	?	0	20	17th
2005	Formula BMW World Final	ASL Team Mücke Motorsport	1	0	0	0	0	N/A	NC
2006	British Formula Renault 2.0	Fortec Motorsport	20	0	0	0	0	197	11th
2007	Eurocup Formula Renault 2.0	Motorsport Arena	14	0	0	0	0	6	20th
2007	Formula Renault 2.0 North European Cup	Motorsport Arena	10	0	0	0	2	118	9th
2007	Italian Formula Renault 2.0 - Winter Series	RP Motorsport	4	0	0	0	2	86	**3rd**
2008	Euroseries 3000	GP Racing	15	2	0	6	6	58	**2nd**
2008	Italian Formula 3000	GP Racing	8	2	0	3	4	34	**2nd**
2008	Radical European Master Series - SR3	PoleVision Racing	?	?	?	?	?	67	12th
2008–09	A1 Grand Prix	A1 Team Italy	2	0	0	0	0	17†	16th†
2009	Euroseries 3000	Coloni Motorsport ‡	13	2	0	2	8	65	**3rd**
2009	Italian Formula 3000	Coloni Motorsport ‡	7	1	0	1	5	36	**3rd**
2010	Auto GP	Team Lazarus	12	0	0	0	4	24	8th
2011	Auto GP	Lazarus	13	1	0	0	3	99	5th
2011	GP2 Final	Super Nova Racing	2	0	0	0	0	0	14th
2012	GP2 Series	Scuderia Coloni	24	0	0	0	0	13	20th
2013	FIA GT Series	AF Corse	8	0	0	0	2	34	13th

† – Team standings.

‡ – The team were known as FMS International until the second round of the season.

=== Complete Eurocup Formula Renault 2.0 results ===
(key) (Races in bold indicate pole position; races in italics indicate fastest lap)

Year	Entrant	1	2	3	4	5	6	7	8	9	10	11	12	13	14	DC	Points
2007	Motorsport Arena	ZOL; 1; 23	ZOL; 2; 8	NÜR; 1; 13	NÜR; 2 Ret	HUN; 1; 8	HUN; 2; 12	DON; 1; 12	DON; 2 Ret	MAG; 1; 22	MAG; 2; 14	EST; 1; 12	EST; 2; 12	CAT; 1; 18	CAT; 2; 21	20th	6

=== Complete Formula Renault 2.0 NEC results ===
(key) (Races in bold indicate pole position) (Races in italics indicate fastest lap)

Year	Entrant	1	2	3	4	5	6	7	8	9	10	11	12	13	14	15	16	DC	Points
2007	Motopark Academy	ZAN; 1; 2	ZAN; 2 Ret	OSC; 1; 7	OSC; 2 Ret	ASS; 1; 4	ASS; 2; 5	ZOL; 1; 4	ZOL; 1; 4	NUR; 1; 4	NUR; 2; 3	OSC; 1	OSC; 2	SPA; 1	SPA; 2	HOC; 1	HOC; 2	9th	118

=== Complete GP2 Series results ===
(key) (Races in bold indicate pole position) (Races in italics indicate fastest lap)

Year	Entrant	1	2	3	4	5	6	7	8	9	10	11	12	13	14	15	16	17	18	19	20	21	22	23	24	DC	Points
2012	Scuderia Coloni	SEP; FEA; 20	SEP; SPR; 13	BHR1; FEA; 8	BHR1; SPR; 14	BHR2; FEA; 20	BHR2; SPR; 9	CAT; FEA; 6	CAT; SPR; 18	MON; FEA; Ret	MON; SPR; Ret	VAL; FEA; 13	VAL; SPR; 17	SIL; FEA; 22	SIL; SPR; 8	HOC; FEA; 19	HOC; SPR; 22	HUN; FEA; 11	HUN; SPR; 24	SPA; FEA; 16	SPA; SPR; 12	MNZ; FEA; 21	MNZ; SPR; Ret	MRN; FEA; Ret	MRN; SPR; 20	20th	13

==== Complete GP2 Final results ====
(key) (Races in bold indicate pole position) (Races in italics indicate fastest lap)

Year	Entrant	1	2	DC	Points
2011	Super Nova Racing	YMC; FEA; 18	YMC; SPR; 11	14th	0

=== FIA GT Series results ===
Year	Class	Team	Car	1	2	3	4	5	6	7	8	9	10	11	12	Pos.	Points
2013	Pro-Am	AF Corse	Ferrari	NOG; QR; DNS	NOG; CR; DNS	ZOL; QR; 9	ZOL; CR; 12	ZAN; QR; Ret	ZAN; QR; Ret	SVK; QR; 13	SVK; CR; 9	NAV; QR	NAV; CR	TBA; QR	TBA; CR	13th	34
