= 2012 Monaco GP2 Series round =

Motor racing competition

2012 Monaco GP2 round
Round details
- Round 5 of 12 rounds in the 2012 GP2 Series
- Circuit de Monaco
- Location: Circuit de Monaco
- Course: Street circuit 3.34 km (2.08 mi)

GP2 Series

Feature race
- Date: 25 May 2012
- Laps: 42

Pole position
Driver	(Venezuela) Johnny Cecotto Jr.	Barwa Addax Team
- Time: 1:21.195

Podium
First	(Venezuela) Johnny Cecotto Jr.	Barwa Addax Team
Second	(Sweden) Marcus Ericsson	iSport International
Third	(Netherlands) Giedo van der Garde	Caterham Racing

Fastest lap
Driver	(Monaco) Stefano Coletti	Scuderia Coloni
- Time: 1:22.667 (on lap 41)

Sprint race
- Date: 26 May 2012
- Laps: 30

Podium
First	(United Kingdom) Jolyon Palmer	iSport International
Second	(United Kingdom) Max Chilton	Carlin
Third	(Netherlands) Giedo van der Garde	Caterham Racing

Fastest lap
Driver	(Brazil) Luiz Razia	Arden International
- Time: 1:22.223 (on lap 30)

The 2012 Monaco GP2 Series round was the fifth round of the 2012 GP2 Series season. It was held on May 24–26, 2012 at Circuit de Monaco, Monte Carlo, Monaco. The race was used to support the 2012 Monaco Grand Prix.

== Classification ==
=== Qualifying ===
The qualifying session was divided into two groups in order to avoid accidents due to the overcrowding on the track. Following a ballot, Group A was formed by cars with even numbers and Group B by those with odd numbers. The grid was formed in two rows in order from the sessions.

Group A

Pos.	No.	Driver	Team	Time	Grid
1	26	(United Kingdom) Max Chilton	Carlin	1:21.320	2
2	12	(Netherlands) Giedo van der Garde	Caterham Racing	1:21.475	4
3	8	(United Kingdom) Jolyon Palmer	iSport International	1:21.530	6
4	2	(Czech Republic) Josef Král	Barwa Addax Team	1:21.776	8
5	10	(Mexico) Esteban Gutiérrez	Lotus GP	1:21.796	10
6	14	(Monaco) Stefano Coletti	Scuderia Coloni	1:22.174	12
7	16	(Monaco) Stéphane Richelmi	Trident Racing	1:22.326	14
8	6	(France) Nathanaël Berthon	Racing Engineering	1:22.475	16
9	4	(Brazil) Felipe Nasr	DAMS	1:22.650	18
10	22	(Switzerland) Simon Trummer	Arden International	1:22.997	20
11	18	(Italy) Fabrizio Crestani	Venezuela GP Lazarus	1:23.193	22
12	24	(Brazil) Víctor Guerin	Ocean Racing Technology	1:23.792	24
13	20	(Portugal) Ricardo Teixeira	Rapax	1:25.661	26

Group B

Pos.	No.	Driver	Team	Time	Grid
1	1	(Venezuela) Johnny Cecotto Jr.	Barwa Addax Team	1:21.195	1
2	7	(Sweden) Marcus Ericsson	iSport International	1:21.249	3
3	23	(Brazil) Luiz Razia	Arden International	1:21.858	5
4	3	(Italy) Davide Valsecchi	DAMS	1:21.912	7
5	5	(Switzerland) Fabio Leimer	Racing Engineering	1:22.053	9
6	21	(France) Tom Dillmann	Rapax	1:22.288	11
7	9	(United Kingdom) James Calado	Lotus GP	1:22.598	13
8	17	(Colombia) Julián Leal	Trident Racing	1:22.762	15
9	11	(Venezuela) Rodolfo González	Caterham Racing	1:22.873	17
10	25	(Netherlands) Nigel Melker	Ocean Racing Technology	1:22.996	19
11	15	(Italy) Fabio Onidi	Scuderia Coloni	1:23.020	21
12	27	(Indonesia) Rio Haryanto	Carlin	1:23.539	23
13	19	(Venezuela) Giancarlo Serenelli	Venezuela GP Lazarus	1:25.907	25

=== Qualifying summary ===
Pos.	No.	Driver	Team	Pos.	No.	Driver	Team
1	1	(Venezuela) Johnny Cecotto Jr.	Barwa Addax Team				
				2	26	(United Kingdom) Max Chilton	Carlin
3	7	(Sweden) Marcus Ericsson	iSport International				
				4	12	(Netherlands) Giedo van der Garde	Caterham Racing
5	23	(Brazil) Luiz Razia	Arden International				
				6	8	(United Kingdom) Jolyon Palmer	iSport International
7	3	(Italy) Davide Valsecchi	DAMS				
				8	2	(Czech Republic) Josef Král	Barwa Addax Team
9	5	(Switzerland) Fabio Leimer	Racing Engineering				
				10	10	(Mexico) Esteban Gutiérrez	Lotus GP
11	21	(France) Tom Dillmann	Rapax				
				12	14	(Monaco) Stefano Coletti	Scuderia Coloni
13	9	(United Kingdom) James Calado	Lotus GP				
				14	16	(Monaco) Stéphane Richelmi	Trident Racing
15	17	(Colombia) Julián Leal	Trident Racing				
				16	6	(France) Nathanaël Berthon	Racing Engineering
17	11	(Venezuela) Rodolfo González	Caterham Racing				
				18	4	(Brazil) Felipe Nasr	DAMS
19	25	(Netherlands) Nigel Melker	Ocean Racing Technology				
				20	22	(Switzerland) Simon Trummer	Arden International
21	15	(Italy) Fabio Onidi	Scuderia Coloni				
				22	18	(Italy) Fabrizio Crestani	Venezuela GP Lazarus
23	27	(Indonesia) Rio Haryanto	Carlin				
				24	24	(Brazil) Victor Guerin	Ocean Racing Technology
25	19	(Venezuela) Giancarlo Serenelli	Venezuela GP Lazarus				
				26	20	(Portugal) Ricardo Teixeira	Rapax

=== Feature race ===
Pos.	No.	Driver	Team	Laps	Time/Retired	Grid	Points
1	1	(Venezuela) Johnny Cecotto Jr.	Barwa Addax Team	42	59:42.521	1	29 (25+4)
2	7	(Sweden) Marcus Ericsson	iSport International	42	+0.564	3	18
3	12	(Netherlands) Giedo van der Garde	Caterham Racing	42	+5.040	4	15
4	3	(Italy) Davide Valsecchi	DAMS	42	+16.347	7	12
5	26	(United Kingdom) Max Chilton	Carlin	42	+17.378	2	10
6	8	(United Kingdom) Jolyon Palmer	iSport International	42	+21.883	6	8
7	9	(United Kingdom) James Calado	Lotus GP	42	+25.686	13	6
8	16	(Monaco) Stéphane Richelmi	Trident Racing	42	+42.275	14	4
9	6	(France) Nathanaël Berthon	Racing Engineering	42	+45.319	16	2
10	14	(Monaco) Stefano Coletti	Scuderia Coloni	42	+47.099	12	3 (1+2)
11	21	(France) Tom Dillmann	Rapax	42	+51.285	11	
12	22	(Switzerland) Simon Trummer	Arden International	42	+1:04.054	20	
13	11	(Venezuela) Rodolfo González	Caterham Racing	42	+1:21.396	17	
14	27	(Indonesia) Rio Haryanto	Carlin	42	+1:23.537	23	
15	23	(Brazil) Luiz Razia	Arden International	42	+1:23.639	5	
16	24	(Brazil) Víctor Guerin	Ocean Racing Technology	41	+1 lap	24	
17	4	(Brazil) Felipe Nasr	DAMS	41	+1 lap	18	
18	5	(Switzerland) Fabio Leimer	Racing Engineering	41	+1 lap	9	
19	18	(Italy) Fabrizio Crestani	Venezuela GP Lazarus	41	+1 lap	22	
20	20	(Portugal) Ricardo Teixeira	Rapax	41	+1 lap	26	
21	17	(Colombia) Julián Leal	Trident Racing	40	+2 laps	15	
22	19	(Venezuela) Giancarlo Serenelli	Venezuela GP Lazarus	40	+2 laps	25	
23	10	(Mexico) Esteban Gutiérrez	Lotus GP	37	Retired^{1}	10	
Ret	25	(Netherlands) Nigel Melker	Ocean Racing Technology	32	Retired	19	
Ret	15	(Italy) Fabio Onidi	Scuderia Coloni	26	Retired	21	
Ret	2	(Czech Republic) Josef Král	Barwa Addax Team	0	Retired	8	
Fastest lap: Stefano Coletti (Scuderia Coloni) — 1:22.667 (lap 41)

Notes:

- ^1 — Esteban Gutiérrez was classified as having finished the race, as he had completed 90% of the winners race distance.

=== Sprint race ===
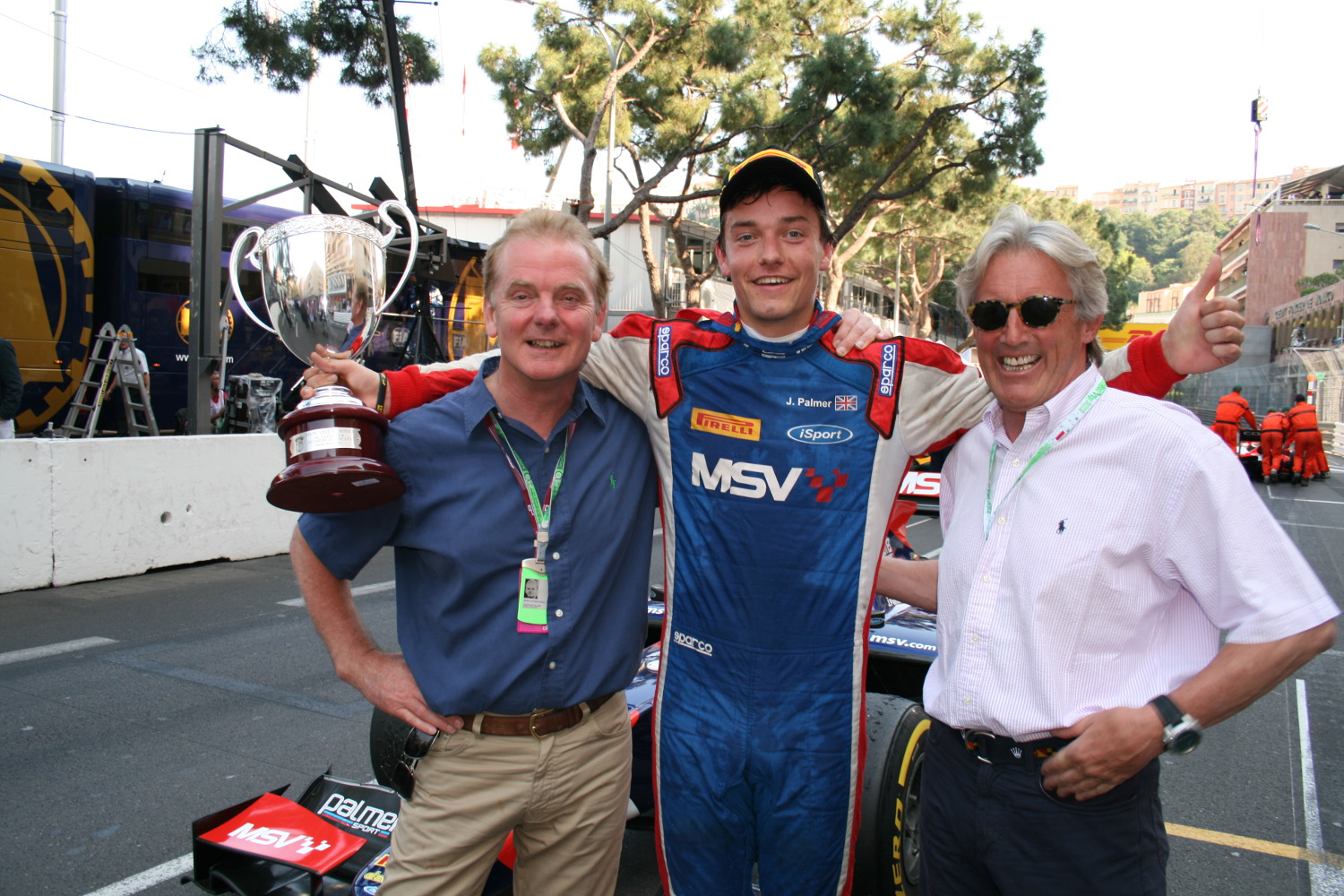
Jolyon Palmer celebrates his win in with his father Jonathan

Pos.	No.	Driver	Team	Laps	Time/Retired	Grid	Points
1	8	(United Kingdom) Jolyon Palmer	iSport International	30	45:41.227	3	15
2	26	(United Kingdom) Max Chilton	Carlin	30	+1.083	4	12
3	12	(Netherlands) Giedo van der Garde	Caterham Racing	30	+4.426	6	10
4	7	(Sweden) Marcus Ericsson	iSport International	30	+8.133	7	8
5	11	(Venezuela) Rodolfo González	Caterham Racing	30	+19.968	13	6
6	23	(Brazil) Luiz Razia	Arden International	30	+23.273	15	6 (4+2)
7	6	(France) Nathanaël Berthon	Racing Engineering	30	+26.376	9	2
8	10	(Mexico) Esteban Gutiérrez	Lotus GP	30	+26.880	23	1
9	22	(Switzerland) Simon Trummer	Arden International	30	+31.663	12	
10	2	(Czech Republic) Josef Král	Barwa Addax Team	30	+35.338	26	
11	27	(Indonesia) Rio Haryanto	Carlin	30	+36.546	14	
12	25	(Netherlands) Nigel Melker	Ocean Racing Technology	30	+37.164	24	
Ret	9	(United Kingdom) James Calado	Lotus GP	20	Accident damage	2	
Ret	17	(Colombia) Julián Leal	Trident Racing	12	Engine	21	
Ret	5	(Switzerland) Fabio Leimer	Racing Engineering	8	Engine	18	
Ret	18	(Italy) Fabrizio Crestani	Venezuela GP Lazarus	8	Engine	19	
Ret	24	(Brazil) Víctor Guerin	Ocean Racing Technology	0	Collision	16	
Ret	21	(France) Tom Dillmann	Rapax	0	Collision	11	
Ret	16	(Monaco) Stéphane Richelmi	Trident Racing	0	Collision damage	1	
Ret	14	(Monaco) Stefano Coletti	Scuderia Coloni	0	Collision	10	
Ret	20	(Portugal) Ricardo Teixeira	Rapax	0	Collision	20	
Ret	1	(Venezuela) Johnny Cecotto Jr.	Barwa Addax Team	0	Collision	8	
Ret	19	(Venezuela) Giancarlo Serenelli	Venezuela GP Lazarus	0	Collision	22	
Ret	15	(Italy) Fabio Onidi	Scuderia Coloni	0	Collision	25	
Ret	4	(Brazil) Felipe Nasr	DAMS	0	Collision	17	
Ret	3	(Italy) Davide Valsecchi	DAMS	0	Collision	5	
Fastest lap: Luiz Razia (Arden International) — 1:22.223 (lap 30)

== Standings after the round ==
Drivers' Championship standings

	Pos	Driver	Points
	1	(Italy) Davide Valsecchi	141
	2	(Brazil) Luiz Razia	110
1	3	(Netherlands) Giedo van der Garde	85
2	4	(United Kingdom) Max Chilton	79
2	5	(United Kingdom) James Calado	75

Teams' Championship standings

	Pos	Team	Points
	1	(France) DAMS	169
	2	(France) Lotus GP	135
	3	(United Kingdom) Arden International	111
	4	(United Kingdom) Carlin	95
1	5	(Malaysia) Caterham Racing	91

- Note: Only the top five positions are included for both sets of standings.

== See also ==
- 2012 Monaco Grand Prix
- 2012 Monaco GP3 Series round

Previous round: 2012 Catalunya GP2 Series round	GP2 Series; 2012 season	Next round: 2012 Valencia GP2 Series round
Previous round: 2011 Monaco GP2 Series round	Monaco GP2 round	Next round: 2013 Monaco GP2 Series round
