= 2012 Valencia GP2 Series round =

2012 GP2 race held in Spain

(Spain) 2012 Valencia GP2 round
Round details
- Round 6 of 12 rounds in the 2012 GP2 Series
- Valencia Street Circuit
- Location: Valencia, Spain
- Course: Street circuit 5.419 km (3.367 mi)

GP2 Series

Feature race
- Date: 23 June 2012
- Laps: 28 (30 scheduled)

Pole position
Driver	(United Kingdom) James Calado	Lotus GP
- Time: 1:47.342

Podium
First	(Mexico) Esteban Gutiérrez	Lotus GP
Second	(Sweden) Marcus Ericsson	iSport International
Third	(Brazil) Luiz Razia	Arden International

Fastest lap
Driver	(Mexico) Esteban Gutiérrez	Lotus GP
- Time: 1:49.360 (on lap 28)

Sprint race
- Date: 24 June 2012
- Laps: 23

Podium
First	(Brazil) Luiz Razia	Arden International
Second	(United Kingdom) James Calado	Lotus GP
Third	(Switzerland) Fabio Leimer	Racing Engineering

Fastest lap
Driver	(Brazil) Felipe Nasr (Note: Felipe Nasr set the fastest lap, but did not finish in the top 10, so was ineligible to be the point-scorer for the fastest lap. Fabio Leimer was the point-scorer instead for setting the fastest lap of those finishing in the top 10.)	DAMS
- Time: 1:50.556 (on lap 18)

The 2012 Valencia GP2 Series round was the sixth round of the 2012 GP2 Series season. It was held on June 22–24, 2012 at Valencia Street Circuit, Valencia, Spain. The race was used to support the 2012 European Grand Prix.

== Classification ==
=== Qualifying ===
Pos.	No.	Driver	Team	Time	Grid
1	9	(United Kingdom) James Calado	Lotus GP	1:47.342	1
2	4	(Brazil) Felipe Nasr	DAMS	1:47.349	2
3	10	(Mexico) Esteban Gutiérrez	Lotus GP	1:47.444	5^{1}
4	3	(Italy) Davide Valsecchi	DAMS	1:47.458	6^{1}
5	12	(Netherlands) Giedo van der Garde	Caterham Racing	1:47.543	3
6	26	(United Kingdom) Max Chilton	Carlin	1:47.674	4
7	5	(Switzerland) Fabio Leimer	Racing Engineering	1:47.779	7
8	8	(United Kingdom) Jolyon Palmer	iSport International	1:47.801	8
9	7	(Sweden) Marcus Ericsson	iSport International	1:47.972	9
10	27	(Indonesia) Rio Haryanto	Carlin	1:47.996	10
11	23	(Brazil) Luiz Razia	Arden International	1:48.155	11
12	20	(France) Tom Dillmann	Rapax	1:48.176	12
13	14	(Monaco) Stefano Coletti	Scuderia Coloni	1:48.222	13
14	16	(Monaco) Stéphane Richelmi	Trident Racing	1:48.288	14
15	1	(Venezuela) Johnny Cecotto Jr.	Barwa Addax Team	1:48.390	17^{1}
16	6	(France) Nathanaël Berthon	Racing Engineering	1:48.518	15
17	22	(Switzerland) Simon Trummer	Arden International	1:48.565	18^{1}
18	15	(Italy) Fabio Onidi	Scuderia Coloni	1:48.578	16
19	2	(Czech Republic) Josef Král	Barwa Addax Team	1:48.626	19
20	17	(Colombia) Julián Leal	Trident Racing	1:48.641	20
21	18	(Italy) Fabrizio Crestani	Venezuela GP Lazarus	1:48.846	21
22	11	(Venezuela) Rodolfo González	Caterham Racing	1:48.936	22
23	25	(Netherlands) Nigel Melker	Ocean Racing Technology	1:49.021	23
24	24	(Brazil) Víctor Guerin	Ocean Racing Technology	1:49.335	24
25	21	(Netherlands) Daniël de Jong	Rapax	1:49.900	25
	19	(Venezuela) Giancarlo Serenelli	Venezuela GP Lazarus	No time	26

Notes:

- ^1 — Esteban Gutiérrez, Davide Valsecchi and Johnny Cecotto Jr. were each handed a three grid position penalty and Simon Trummer was dropped two places, having impeded other competitors during the qualifying session.

=== Feature race ===
Pos.	No.	Driver	Team	Laps	Time/Retired	Grid	Points
1	10	(Mexico) Esteban Gutiérrez	Lotus GP	28	1:00:31.895	5	27 (25+2)
2	7	(Sweden) Marcus Ericsson	iSport International	28	+1.615	9	18
3	23	(Brazil) Luiz Razia	Arden International	28	+6.064	11	15
4	5	(Switzerland) Fabio Leimer	Racing Engineering	28	+6.408	7	12
5	27	(Indonesia) Rio Haryanto	Carlin	28	+6.928	10	10
6	6	(France) Nathanaël Berthon	Racing Engineering	28	+7.605	15	8
7	26	(United Kingdom) Max Chilton	Carlin	28	+8.384	4	6
8	9	(United Kingdom) James Calado	Lotus GP	28	+11.099	1	8 (4+4)
9	14	(Monaco) Stefano Coletti	Scuderia Coloni	28	+15.404	13	2
10	22	(Switzerland) Simon Trummer	Arden International	28	+15.782	18	1
11	12	(Netherlands) Giedo van der Garde	Caterham Racing	28	+15.962	3	
12	17	(Colombia) Julián Leal	Trident Racing	28	+16.869	20	
13	15	(Italy) Fabio Onidi	Scuderia Coloni	28	+17.715	16	
14	16	(Monaco) Stéphane Richelmi	Trident Racing	28	+18.338	14	
15	11	(Venezuela) Rodolfo González	Caterham Racing	28	+22.983	22	
16	21	(Netherlands) Daniël de Jong	Rapax	28	+23.456	25	
17	24	(Brazil) Víctor Guerin	Ocean Racing Technology	27	+1 lap	24	
18	3	(Italy) Davide Valsecchi	DAMS	28	+30.573^{2}	6	
Ret	19	(Venezuela) Giancarlo Serenelli	Venezuela GP Lazarus	21	Retired	26	
Ret	4	(Brazil) Felipe Nasr	DAMS	18	Retired	2	
Ret	8	(United Kingdom) Jolyon Palmer	iSport International	17	Retired	8	
Ret	18	(Italy) Fabrizio Crestani	Venezuela GP Lazarus	17	Retired	21	
Ret	20	(France) Tom Dillmann	Rapax	11	Retired	12	
Ret	25	(Netherlands) Nigel Melker	Ocean Racing Technology	1	Retired	23	
DSQ	2	(Czech Republic) Josef Král	Barwa Addax Team	28	(+19.580)^{3}	19	
DSQ	1	(Venezuela) Johnny Cecotto Jr.	Barwa Addax Team	28	(+39.627)^{3}	17	
Fastest lap: Esteban Gutiérrez (Lotus GP) — 1:49.360 (lap 28)

Notes:

- ^2 — Davide Valsecchi had 20 seconds added to his race time after he was judged to have overtaken during a safety car period.
- ^3 — Barwa Addax drivers, Josef Král and Johnny Cecotto Jr. were excluded from the race results, after they were each given tyres which were allocated to the other at the pit stop.

=== Sprint race ===
Pos.	No.	Driver	Team	Laps	Time/Retired	Grid	Points
1	23	(Brazil) Luiz Razia	Arden International	23	46:07.255	6	15
2	9	(United Kingdom) James Calado	Lotus GP	23	+1.179	1	12
3	5	(Switzerland) Fabio Leimer	Racing Engineering	23	+1.587	5	12 (10+2)
4	26	(United Kingdom) Max Chilton	Carlin	23	+2.425	2	8
5	6	(France) Nathanaël Berthon	Racing Engineering	23	+2.957	3	6
6	12	(Netherlands) Giedo van der Garde	Caterham Racing	23	+4.969	11	4
7	22	(Switzerland) Simon Trummer	Arden International	23	+8.415	10	2
8	17	(Colombia) Julián Leal	Trident Racing	23	+9.501	12	1
9	21	(Netherlands) Daniël de Jong	Rapax	23	+13.591	15	
10	3	(Italy) Davide Valsecchi	DAMS	23	+17.564	16	
11	2	(Czech Republic) Josef Král	Barwa Addax Team	23	+21.005	26	
12	20	(France) Tom Dillmann	Rapax	23	+34.565	21	
13	25	(Netherlands) Nigel Melker	Ocean Racing Technology	23	+46.929	22	
14	4	(Brazil) Felipe Nasr	DAMS	23	+50.083	19	
15	11	(Venezuela) Rodolfo González	Caterham Racing	23	+51.366	24^{4}	
16	19	(Venezuela) Giancarlo Serenelli	Venezuela GP Lazarus	23	+57.490	18	
17	15	(Italy) Fabio Onidi	Scuderia Coloni	23	+1:03.342	13	
18	24	(Brazil) Víctor Guerin	Ocean Racing Technology	23	+1:03.439	17	
Ret	27	(Indonesia) Rio Haryanto	Carlin	19	Retired	4	
Ret	16	(Monaco) Stéphane Richelmi	Trident Racing	5	Retired	14	
Ret	8	(United Kingdom) Jolyon Palmer	iSport International	3	Retired	23^{4}	
Ret	1	(Venezuela) Johnny Cecotto Jr.	Barwa Addax Team	3	Retired	25	
Ret	14	(Monaco) Stefano Coletti	Scuderia Coloni	0	Retired	9	
Ret	7	(Sweden) Marcus Ericsson	iSport International	0	Retired	7	
Ret	10	(Mexico) Esteban Gutiérrez	Lotus GP	0	Retired	8	
DNS	18	(Italy) Fabrizio Crestani	Venezuela GP Lazarus	0	Not started	20	
Fastest lap: Felipe Nasr (DAMS) — 1:50.556 (lap 18)

Notes:

- ^4 — Jolyon Palmer and Rodolfo González were both handed a ten place grid position penalty for causing separate collisions during Feature Race.

== Standings after the round ==
Drivers' Championship standings

	Pos	Driver	Points
	1	(Italy) Davide Valsecchi	141
	2	(Brazil) Luiz Razia	140
2	3	(United Kingdom) James Calado	95
1	4	(United Kingdom) Max Chilton	93
2	5	(Netherlands) Giedo van der Garde	89

Teams' Championship standings

	Pos	Team	Points
1	1	(France) Lotus GP	182
1	2	(France) DAMS	169
	3	(United Kingdom) Arden International	144
	4	(United Kingdom) Carlin	119
1	5	(Spain) Racing Engineering	106

- Note: Only the top five positions are included for both sets of standings.

== See also ==
- 2012 European Grand Prix
- 2012 Valencia GP3 Series round

== Notes ==
Previous round: 2012 Monaco GP2 Series round	GP2 Series; 2012 season	Next round: 2012 Silverstone GP2 Series round
Previous round: 2011 Valencia GP2 Series round	Valencia GP2 round	Next round: none
