= 2012 Catalunya GP2 Series round =

GP2 Series motor race held in Montmeló, Spain

(Spain) 2012 Catalunya GP2 round
Round details
- Round 4 of 12 rounds in the 2012 GP2 Series
- Circuit de Catalunya
- Location: Circuit de Catalunya; Montmeló, Spain
- Course: Permanent racing facility 4.665 km (2.892 mi)

GP2 Series

Feature race
- Date: 12 May 2012
- Laps: 37

Pole position
Driver	(United Kingdom) James Calado	Lotus GP
- Time: 1:30.655

Podium
First	(Netherlands) Giedo van der Garde	Caterham Racing
Second	(United Kingdom) James Calado	Lotus GP
Third	(Monaco) Stefano Coletti	Scuderia Coloni

Fastest lap
Driver	(Mexico) Esteban Gutiérrez	Lotus GP
- Time: 1:35.200 (on lap 21)

Sprint race
- Date: 13 May 2012
- Laps: 25 (26 scheduled)

Podium
First	(Brazil) Luiz Razia	Arden International
Second	(France) Nathanaël Berthon	Racing Engineering
Third	(Italy) Davide Valsecchi	DAMS

Fastest lap
Driver	(Brazil) Victor Guerin	Ocean Racing Technology
- Time: 1:34.343 (on lap 7)

The 2012 Catalunya GP2 Series round was a GP2 Series motor race held at the Circuit de Catalunya in Montmeló, Spain on 12 and 13 May 2012 as the fourth round of the 2012 GP2 Series season. The race was used to support the 2012 Spanish Grand Prix.

After qualifying down in fifth place, the GP2 feature race was won by Giedo van der Garde, with reverse pole man Luiz Razia taking the win at the sprint race.

== Classification ==
=== Qualifying ===
Pos	No.	Driver	Team	Time	Grid
1	9	(United Kingdom) James Calado	Lotus GP	1:30.655	1
2	5	(Switzerland) Fabio Leimer	Racing Engineering	1:30.865	2
3	16	(Monaco) Stéphane Richelmi	Trident Racing	1:30.902	3
4	26	(United Kingdom) Max Chilton	Carlin	1:30.962	4
5	12	(Netherlands) Giedo van der Garde	Caterham Racing	1:31.006	5
6	15	(Italy) Fabio Onidi	Scuderia Coloni	1:31.167	6
7	3	(Italy) Davide Valsecchi	DAMS	1:31.212	7
8	14	(Monaco) Stefano Coletti	Scuderia Coloni	1:31.212	8
9	8	(United Kingdom) Jolyon Palmer	iSport International	1:31.269	9
10	6	(France) Nathanaël Berthon	Racing Engineering	1:31.308	10
11	10	(Mexico) Esteban Gutiérrez	Lotus GP	1:31.320	11
12	25	(Netherlands) Nigel Melker	Ocean Racing Technology	1:31.332	12
13	23	(Brazil) Luiz Razia	Arden International	1:31.377	13
14	7	(Sweden) Marcus Ericsson	iSport International	1:31.391	14
15	1	(Venezuela) Johnny Cecotto Jr.	Barwa Addax Team	1:31.565	15
16	2	(Czech Republic) Josef Král	Barwa Addax Team	1:31.599	16
17	18	(Italy) Fabrizio Crestani	Venezuela GP Lazarus	1:31.677	17
18	21	(France) Tom Dillmann	Rapax	1:31.682	18
19	22	(Switzerland) Simon Trummer	Arden International	1:31.939	19
20	11	(Venezuela) Rodolfo González	Caterham Racing	1:31.966	20
21	24	(Brazil) Victor Guerin	Ocean Racing Technology	1:32.270	21
22	4	(Brazil) Felipe Nasr	DAMS	1:32.325	22
23	17	(Colombia) Julián Leal	Trident Racing	1:32.691	23
24	27	(Indonesia) Rio Haryanto	Carlin	1:33.010	24
25	20	(Portugal) Ricardo Teixeira	Rapax	1:33.083	25
26	19	(Venezuela) Giancarlo Serenelli	Venezuela GP Lazarus	1:33.329	26

=== Feature race ===
Pos.	No.	Driver	Team	Laps	Time/Retired	Grid	Points
1	12	(Netherlands) Giedo van der Garde	Caterham Racing	37	1:00:22.966	5	25
2	9	(United Kingdom) James Calado	Lotus GP	37	+0.878	1	22 (18+4)
3	14	(Monaco) Stefano Coletti	Scuderia Coloni	37	+3.811	8	15
4	3	(Italy) Davide Valsecchi	DAMS	37	+11.859	7	12
5	6	(France) Nathanaël Berthon	Racing Engineering	37	+15.795	10	10
6	15	(Italy) Fabio Onidi	Scuderia Coloni	37	+19.379	6	8
7	26	(United Kingdom) Max Chilton	Carlin	37	+19.768	4	6
8	23	(Brazil) Luiz Razia	Arden International	37	+20.072	13	4
9	8	(United Kingdom) Jolyon Palmer	iSport International	37	+27.624	9	2
10	10	(Mexico) Esteban Gutiérrez	Lotus GP	37	+36.653	11	3 (1+2)
11	4	(Brazil) Felipe Nasr	DAMS	37	+45.264	22	
12	5	(Switzerland) Fabio Leimer	Racing Engineering	37	+46.534	2	
13	7	(Sweden) Marcus Ericsson	iSport International	37	+47.087	14	
14	25	(Netherlands) Nigel Melker	Ocean Racing Technology	37	+47.356	12	
15	11	(Venezuela) Rodolfo González	Caterham Racing	37	+53.555	20	
16	27	(Indonesia) Rio Haryanto	Carlin	37	+1:00.879	24	
17	18	(Italy) Fabrizio Crestani	Venezuela GP Lazarus	37	+1:06.737	17	
18	1	(Venezuela) Johnny Cecotto Jr.	Barwa Addax Team	37	+1:11.199	15	
19	24	(Brazil) Victor Guerin	Ocean Racing Technology	37	+1:11.397	21	
20	2	(Czech Republic) Josef Král	Barwa Addax Team	37	+1:14.871	16	
21	16	(Monaco) Stéphane Richelmi	Trident Racing	37	+1:15.821	3	
22	21	(France) Tom Dillmann	Rapax	37	+1:20.031	18	
23	22	(Switzerland) Simon Trummer	Arden International	37	+1:20.382	19	
24	17	(Colombia) Julián Leal	Trident Racing	37	+1:28.989	23	
25	19	(Venezuela) Giancarlo Serenelli	Venezuela GP Lazarus	36	+1 lap	26	
Ret	20	(Portugal) Ricardo Teixeira	Rapax	8	Retired	25	
Fastest lap: Esteban Gutiérrez (Lotus GP) — 1:35.200 (lap 21)

=== Sprint race ===
Pos.	No.	Driver	Team	Laps	Time/Retired	Grid	Points
1	23	(Brazil) Luiz Razia	Arden International	25	40:08.411	1	17 (15+2)
2	6	(France) Nathanaël Berthon	Racing Engineering	25	+5.256	4	12
3	3	(Italy) Davide Valsecchi	DAMS	25	+5.897	5	10
4	9	(United Kingdom) James Calado	Lotus GP	25	+6.575	7	8
5	26	(United Kingdom) Max Chilton	Carlin	25	+13.117	2	6
6	12	(Netherlands) Giedo van der Garde	Caterham	25	+14.362	8	4
7	10	(Mexico) Esteban Gutiérrez	Lotus GP	25	+14.874	10	2
8	14	(Monaco) Stefano Coletti	Scuderia Coloni	25	+19.223	6	1
9	4	(Brazil) Felipe Nasr	DAMS	25	+19.703	11	
10	18	(Italy) Fabrizio Crestani	Venezuela GP Lazarus	25	+21.570	17	
11	5	(Switzerland) Fabio Leimer	Racing Engineering	25	+22.852	12	
12	21	(France) Tom Dillmann	Rapax	25	+23.312	22	
13	1	(Venezuela) Johnny Cecotto Jr.	Barwa Addax Team	25	+30.155	18	
14	11	(Venezuela) Rodolfo González	Caterham Racing	25	+30.601	15	
15	27	(Indonesia) Rio Haryanto	Carlin	25	+31.281	16	
16	2	(Czech Republic) Josef Král	Barwa Addax Team	25	+31.834	20	
17	17	(Colombia) Julián Leal	Trident Racing	25	+32.817	24	
18	15	(Italy) Fabio Onidi	Scuderia Coloni	25	+34.371	3	
19	16	(Monaco) Stéphane Richelmi	Trident Racing	25	+34.818	21	
20	22	(Switzerland) Simon Trummer	Arden International	25	+35.426	23	
21	24	(Brazil) Victor Guerin	Ocean Racing Technology	25	+38.977	19	
22	7	(Sweden) Marcus Ericsson	iSport International	25	+39.878	13	
23	20	(Portugal) Ricardo Teixeira	Rapax	25	+41.979	26	
24	25	(Netherlands) Nigel Melker	Ocean Racing Technology	25	+48.441	14	
Ret	19	(Venezuela) Giancarlo Serenelli	Venezuela GP Lazarus	3	Retired	25	
Ret	8	(United Kingdom) Jolyon Palmer	iSport International	0	Did not start	9	
Fastest lap: Victor Guerin (Ocean Racing Technology) — 1:34.343 (lap 7)

== Standings after the round ==
Drivers' Championship standings

	Pos	Driver	Points
	1	(Italy) Davide Valsecchi	129
	2	(Brazil) Luiz Razia	104
3	3	(United Kingdom) James Calado	69
3	4	(Netherlands) Giedo van der Garde	60
2	5	(Mexico) Esteban Gutiérrez	59

Teams' Championship standings

Pos	Team	Points
1	(France) DAMS	157
2	(France) Lotus GP	128
3	(United Kingdom) Arden International	105
4	(United Kingdom) Carlin	73
5	(Spain) Racing Engineering	64

- Note: Only the top five positions are included for both sets of standings.

== See also ==
- 2012 Spanish Grand Prix
- 2012 Catalunya GP3 Series round

Previous round: 2012 Bahrain 2nd GP2 Series round	GP2 Series; 2012 season	Next round: 2012 Monaco GP2 Series round
Previous round: 2011 Catalunya GP2 Series round	Catalunya GP2 round	Next round: 2013 Catalunya GP2 Series round
