= 2012 Marina Bay GP2 Series round =

(Singapore) 2012 Marina Bay GP2 round
Round details
- Round 12 of 12 rounds in the 2012 GP2 Series
- Layout of the Marina Bay street circuit
- Location: Marina Bay Street Circuit, Marina Bay, Singapore
- Course: Street circuit 5.073 km (3.152 mi)

GP2 Series

Feature race
- Date: 22 September 2012
- Laps: 28 (Note: The race was scheduled to take place over 34 laps, but was revised to 28 as per series regulations, which state that the feature race will be run to the first lap over 170 kilometres (110 mi), or the first lap over one hour of racing. As lap 28 marked the first lap over one hour of racing, the number of laps was reduced.)

Pole position
Driver	(Italy) Luca Filippi	Scuderia Coloni
- Time: 1:59.444

Podium
First	(United Kingdom) Max Chilton	Carlin
Second	(Mexico) Esteban Gutiérrez	Lotus GP
Third	(Switzerland) Fabio Leimer	Racing Engineering

Fastest lap
Driver	(Mexico) Esteban Gutiérrez (Note: Luca Filippi set the fastest lap, but did not finish in the top 10, so was ineligible to be the point-scorer for the fastest lap. Esteban Gutiérrez was the point-scorer instead for setting the fastest lap of those finishing in the top 10.)	Lotus GP
- Time: 2:04.247 (on lap 17)

Sprint race
- Date: 23 September 2012
- Laps: 24

Podium
First	(Netherlands) Giedo van der Garde	Caterham Racing
Second	(Sweden) Marcus Ericsson	iSport International
Third	(Switzerland) Fabio Leimer	Racing Engineering

Fastest lap
Driver	(Monaco) Stefano Coletti (Note: Nathanaël Berthon set the fastest lap, but did not finish in the top 10, so was ineligible to be the point-scorer for the fastest lap. Stefano Coletti was the point-scorer instead for setting the fastest lap of those finishing in the top 10.)	Rapax
- Time: 2:03.184 (on lap 5)

The 2012 Marina Bay GP2 Series round was a GP2 Series motor race held on September 22 and 23, 2012 at the Marina Bay Street Circuit in Marina Bay, Singapore. It was the final round of the 2012 GP2 Season and was run in support of the Singapore Grand Prix. The event marked the first time the GP2 Series had travelled to Singapore. With the 2012 GP3 Series season having concluded at the previous round at Monza.

Davide Valsecchi was declared the 2012 series champion after he out-scored title rival Luiz Razia in the feature race. Giedo van der Garde won the sprint race.

== Report ==
=== Sprint race ===
Giedo van der Garde, who started from pole, got off to a good start keeping Marcus Ericsson behind him, while Luiz Razia moved up to third. Felipe Nasr got off to a bad start dropping from third to ninth. Sergio Canamasas, on the other hand, had a great start, when he rose from 16th to seventh. On the third lap, he received a drive-through penalty because one of his mechanics was late leaving the grid. Despite being constantly notified of the penalty on the radio, the driver did not return to serve the penalty over three laps, so he was disqualified on lap seven. Thinking that his radio was damaged or had interference, his engineer also used a sign to inform him that he had to return to the pits. It wasn't until lap 14 that Canamasas returned to the pits with a mechanical problem and retired from the race, but he had no idea that he had been disqualified.

The safety car came out on the ninth lap of the race when Rene Binder spun in the last corner. Meanwhile, at the front, van der Garde held on to the lead after the restart and won easily by 1.7 seconds. There was a fight for third place on the last lap when Fabio Leimer overtook Razia in turn ten, taking advantage of his rival's tire problems.

Davide Valsecchi and Felipe Nasr secured the DAMS squad's first teams' title in GP2 with fifth and seventh placed finishes enough to beat rival Lotus GP.

== Classification ==
=== Qualifying ===
Pos.	No.	Driver	Team	Time	Gap	Grid
1	14	(Italy) Luca Filippi	Scuderia Coloni	1:59.444		1
2	26	(United Kingdom) Max Chilton	Carlin	1:59.496	+0.052	2
3	10	(Mexico) Esteban Gutiérrez	Lotus GP	1:59.908	+0.464	3
4	8	(United Kingdom) Jolyon Palmer	iSport International	2:00.102	+0.658	4
5	5	(Switzerland) Fabio Leimer	Racing Engineering	2:00.113	+0.669	5
6	3	(Italy) Davide Valsecchi	DAMS	2:00.287	+0.843	6
7	1	(Venezuela) Johnny Cecotto Jr.	Barwa Addax Team	2:00.335	+0.891	7
8	21	(Monaco) Stefano Coletti	Rapax	2:00.364	+0.920	8
9	23	(Brazil) Luiz Razia	Arden International	2:00.365	+0.921	9
10	18	(Spain) Sergio Canamasas	Venezuela GP Lazarus	2:00.634	+1.190	10
11	16	(Monaco) Stéphane Richelmi	Trident Racing	2:00.671	+1.227	11
12	6	(France) Nathanaël Berthon	Racing Engineering	2:00.695	+1.251	12
13	4	(Brazil) Felipe Nasr	DAMS	2:00.720	+1.276	13
14	12	(Netherlands) Giedo van der Garde	Caterham Racing	2:00.906	+1.462	14
15	9	(United Kingdom) James Calado	Lotus GP	2:00.954	+1.510	15
16	27	(Indonesia) Rio Haryanto	Carlin	2:01.031	+1.587	16
17	7	(Sweden) Marcus Ericsson	iSport International	2:01.204	+1.760	17
18	25	(Netherlands) Nigel Melker	Ocean Racing Technology	2:01.308	+1.864	18
19	17	(Colombia) Julián Leal	Trident Racing	2:01.474	+2.030	19
20	15	(Italy) Fabio Onidi	Scuderia Coloni	2:01.656	+2.212	26^{1}
21	22	(Switzerland) Simon Trummer	Arden International	2:01.961	+2.517	20
22	24	(Brazil) Victor Guerin	Ocean Racing Technology	2:02.110	+2.666	21
23	11	(Venezuela) Rodolfo González	Caterham Racing	2:02.260	+2.816	22
24	19	(Austria) René Binder	Venezuela GP Lazarus	2:02.376	+2.932	23
25	2	(United States) Jake Rosenzweig	Barwa Addax Team	2:03.218	+3.774	24
26	20	(Portugal) Ricardo Teixeira	Rapax	2:04.174	+4.730	25

Notes

- ^1 – Fabio Onidi was given a ten-place grid penalty for causing a collision with Nigel Melker at the previous round in Monza sprint race.

=== Feature race ===
Pos.	No.	Driver	Team	Laps	Time/Retired	Grid	Points
1	26	(United Kingdom) Max Chilton	Carlin	28	1:01:48.095	2	25
2	10	(Mexico) Esteban Gutiérrez	Lotus GP	28	+1.363	3	20 (18+2)
3	5	(Switzerland) Fabio Leimer	Racing Engineering	28	+4.894	5	15
4	3	(Italy) Davide Valsecchi	DAMS	28	+5.945	6	12
5	23	(Brazil) Luiz Razia	Arden International	28	+6.295	9	10
6	4	(Brazil) Felipe Nasr	DAMS	28	+8.798	13	8
7	7	(Sweden) Marcus Ericsson	iSport International	28	+14.229	17	6
8	12	(Netherlands) Giedo van der Garde	Caterham Racing	28	+15.147	14	4
9	27	(Indonesia) Rio Haryanto	Carlin	28	+48.855	16	2
10	6	(France) Nathanaël Berthon	Racing Engineering	28	+49.445	12	1
11	17	(Colombia) Julián Leal	Trident Racing	28	+51.466	19	
12	25	(Netherlands) Nigel Melker	Ocean Racing Technology	28	+52.099	18	
13	21	(Monaco) Stefano Coletti	Rapax	28	+52.839	8	
14	16	(Monaco) Stéphane Richelmi	Trident Racing	28	+1:04.038	11	
15	2	(United States) Jake Rosenzweig	Barwa Addax Team	28	+1:04.314	24	
16	18	(Spain) Sergio Canamasas	Venezuela GP Lazarus	28	+1:04.378	10	
17	20	(Portugal) Ricardo Teixeira	Rapax	28	+1:05.013	25	
Ret	14	(Italy) Luca Filippi	Scuderia Coloni	24	Retired	1	4
Ret	15	(Italy) Fabio Onidi	Scuderia Coloni	24	Retired	26	
Ret	9	(United Kingdom) James Calado	Lotus GP	23	Retired	15	
Ret	8	(United Kingdom) Jolyon Palmer	iSport International	19	Retired	4	
Ret	1	(Venezuela) Johnny Cecotto Jr.	Barwa Addax Team	9	Retired	7	
Ret	11	(Venezuela) Rodolfo González	Caterham Racing	7	Retired	22	
Ret	22	(Switzerland) Simon Trummer	Arden International	5	Retired	20	
Ret	24	(Brazil) Victor Guerin	Ocean Racing Technology	0	Retired	21	
Ret	19	(Austria) René Binder	Venezuela GP Lazarus	0	Retired	23	
Fastest lap: Esteban Gutiérrez (Lotus GP) — 2:04.247 (on lap 17)

=== Sprint race ===
Pos.	No.	Driver	Team	Laps	Time/Retired	Grid	Points
1	12	(Netherlands) Giedo van der Garde	Caterham Racing	21	46:36.606	1	15
2	7	(Sweden) Marcus Ericsson	iSport International	21	+1.719	2	12
3	5	(Switzerland) Fabio Leimer	Racing Engineering	21	+5.684	6	10
4	23	(Brazil) Luiz Razia	Arden International	21	+7.393	4	8
5	3	(Italy) Davide Valsecchi	DAMS	21	+7.942	5	6
6	10	(Mexico) Esteban Gutiérrez	Lotus GP	21	+8.562	7	4
7	4	(Brazil) Felipe Nasr	DAMS	21	+8.718	3	2
8	21	(Monaco) Stefano Coletti	Rapax	21	+15.394	13	3 (1+2)
9	1	(Venezuela) Johnny Cecotto Jr.	Barwa Addax Team	21	+18.981	25^{1}	
10	9	(United Kingdom) James Calado	Lotus GP	21	+21.964	19	
11	27	(Indonesia) Rio Haryanto	Carlin	21	+29.223	9	
12	25	(Netherlands) Nigel Melker	Ocean Racing Technology	21	+38.159	12	
13	24	(Brazil) Victor Guerin	Ocean Racing Technology	21	+42.593	23	
14	22	(Switzerland) Simon Trummer	Arden International	21	+43.366	22	
15	6	(France) Nathanaël Berthon	Racing Engineering	21	+44.482	10	
16	17	(Colombia) Julián Leal	Trident Racing	21	+49.242	11	
17	2	(United States) Jake Rosenzweig	Barwa Addax Team	21	+50.553	15	
18	11	(Venezuela) Rodolfo González	Caterham Racing	21	+1:02.226	21	
19	26	(United Kingdom) Max Chilton	Carlin	21	+1:06.565	8	
20	15	(Italy) Fabio Onidi	Scuderia Coloni	21	+1:07.175	24^{2}	
21	20	(Portugal) Ricardo Teixeira	Rapax	21	+1:07.288	17	
22^{3}	16	(Monaco) Stéphane Richelmi	Trident Racing	19	Retired	14	
Ret	19	(Austria) René Binder	Venezuela GP Lazarus	8	Retired	26	
Ret	8	(United Kingdom) Jolyon Palmer	iSport International	2	Retired	20	
DSQ	18	(Spain) Sergio Canamasas	Venezuela GP Lazarus	14	Disqualified^{4}	16	
DNS	14	(Italy) Luca Filippi	Scuderia Coloni	0	Did not start^{5}	—	
Fastest lap: Stefano Coletti (Rapax) — 2:03.184 (on lap 5)

Notes

- ^1 – Johnny Cecotto Jr. was given a three-place grid penalty for crossing the white pit exit line when rejoining the circuit during the feature race.
- ^2 – Fabio Onidi was given a five-place grid penalty for causing an avoidable accident with Jake Rosenzweig during the feature race.
- ^3 – Stéphane Richelmi was classified as he completed more than 90% of the race distance.
- ^4 – Sergio Canamasas was disqualified because her mechanics worked on her car too close to the start of the formation lap.
- ^5 – Luca Filippi did not start because her car could not be repaired in time after hitting a wall in the feature race.

== Standings after the round ==
Drivers' Championship standings

	Pos.	Driver	Points
	1	(Italy) Davide Valsecchi	247
	2	(Brazil) Luiz Razia	222
1	3	(Mexico) Esteban Gutiérrez	176
1	4	(United Kingdom) Max Chilton	169
2	5	(United Kingdom) James Calado	160

Teams' Championship standings

	Pos.	Team	Points
	1	(France) DAMS	342
	2	(France) Lotus GP	336
	3	(United Kingdom) Arden International	226
	4	(Spain) Racing Engineering	212
1	5	(United Kingdom) Carlin	207

- Note: Only the top five positions are included for both sets of standings.
- Note: Bold names include the Drivers' and Teams' Champion respectively.

== Notes ==
Previous round: 2012 Monza GP2 Series round	GP2 Series; 2012 season	Next round: 2013 Sepang GP2 Series round
Previous round: none	Marina Bay GP2 round	Next round: 2013 Marina Bay GP2 Series round
