= 2012 Hockenheimring GP2 Series round =

Motor race

(Germany) 2012 Hockenheim GP2 round
Round details
- Round 8 of 12 rounds in the 2012 GP2 Series
- The Hockenheimring since 2002
- Location: Hockenheimring, Hockenheim, Germany
- Course: Permanent racing facility 4.574 km (2.842 mi)

GP2 Series

Feature race
- Date: 21 July 2012
- Laps: 38

Pole position
Driver	(Netherlands) Giedo van der Garde	Caterham Racing
- Time: 1:44.022

Podium
First	(Venezuela) Johnny Cecotto Jr.	Barwa Addax Team
Second	(Switzerland) Fabio Leimer	Racing Engineering
Third	(Monaco) Stéphane Richelmi	Trident Racing

Fastest lap
Driver	(Italy) Fabio Onidi	Scuderia Coloni
- Time: 1:25.254 (on lap 31)

Sprint race
- Date: 22 July 2012
- Laps: 27

Podium
First	(United Kingdom) James Calado	Lotus GP
Second	(Netherlands) Giedo van der Garde	Caterham Racing
Third	(Brazil) Felipe Nasr	DAMS

Fastest lap
Driver	(Monaco) Stéphane Richelmi	Trident Racing
- Time: 1:25.760 (on lap 7)

The 2012 Hockenheimring GP2 Series round was a GP2 Series motor race held on July 21 and 22, 2012 at Hockenheimring in Hockenheim, Germany. It was the eighth round of the 2012 GP2 Season. The race supported the 2012 German Grand Prix.

== Classification ==
=== Qualifying ===
Pos.	No.	Driver	Team	Time	Grid
1	12	(Netherlands) Giedo van der Garde	Caterham Racing	1:44.022	1
2	9	(United Kingdom) James Calado	Lotus GP	1:44.034	2
3	5	(Switzerland) Fabio Leimer	Racing Engineering	1:44.944	3
4	25	(Netherlands) Nigel Melker	Ocean Racing Technology	1:45.063	4
5	15	(Italy) Fabio Onidi	Scuderia Coloni	1:45.129	5
6	3	(Italy) Davide Valsecchi	DAMS	1:45.152	6
7	4	(Brazil) Felipe Nasr	DAMS	1:45.420	7
8	24	(Brazil) Victor Guerin	Ocean Racing Technology	1:45.516	8
9	10	(Mexico) Esteban Gutiérrez	Lotus GP	1:45.613	9
10	23	(Brazil) Luiz Razia	Arden International	1:45.636	10
11	26	(United Kingdom) Max Chilton	Carlin	1:45.760	11
12	21	(France) Tom Dillmann	Rapax	1:45.763	12
13	18	(Spain) Sergio Canamasas	Venezuela GP Lazarus	1:45.821	13
14	7	(Sweden) Marcus Ericsson	iSport International	1:45.870	14
15	14	(Monaco) Stefano Coletti	Scuderia Coloni	1:45.907	15
16	6	(France) Nathanaël Berthon	Racing Engineering	1:45.917	16
17	22	(Switzerland) Simon Trummer	Arden International	1:45.939	17
18	1	(Venezuela) Johnny Cecotto Jr.	Barwa Addax Team	1:46.103	18
19	27	(Indonesia) Rio Haryanto	Carlin	1:46.394	19
20	2	(Czech Republic) Josef Král	Barwa Addax Team	1:46.637	20
21	8	(United Kingdom) Jolyon Palmer	iSport International	1:46.651	21
22	16	(Monaco) Stéphane Richelmi	Trident Racing	1:46.849	22
23	17	(Colombia) Julián Leal	Trident Racing	1:47.332	23
24	11	(Venezuela) Rodolfo González	Caterham Racing	1:49.546	24
25	20	(Portugal) Ricardo Teixeira	Rapax	1:52.356	25
26	19	(Venezuela) Giancarlo Serenelli	Venezuela GP Lazarus	No time	26

=== Feature race ===
Pos.	No.	Driver	Team	Laps	Time/Retired	Grid	Points
1	1	(Venezuela) Johnny Cecotto Jr.	Barwa Addax Team	38	58:16.075	18	27 (25+2)
2	5	(Switzerland) Fabio Leimer	Racing Engineering	38	+9.609	3	18
3	16	(Monaco) Stéphane Richelmi	Trident Racing	38	+14.977	22	15
4	4	(Brazil) Felipe Nasr	DAMS	38	+21.464	7	12
5	12	(Netherlands) Giedo van der Garde	Caterham Racing	38	+26.885	1	14 (10+4)
6	25	(Netherlands) Nigel Melker	Ocean Racing Technology	38	+29.260	4	8
7	23	(Brazil) Luiz Razia	Arden International	38	+29.573	10	6
8	9	(United Kingdom) James Calado	Lotus GP	38	+29.950	2	4
9	21	(France) Tom Dillmann	Rapax	38	+31.978	12	2
10	10	(Mexico) Esteban Gutiérrez	Lotus GP	38	+32.373	9	1
11	7	(Sweden) Marcus Ericsson	iSport International	38	+33.798	14	
12	2	(Czech Republic) Josef Král	Barwa Addax Team	38	+39.284	20	
13	3	(Italy) Davide Valsecchi	DAMS	38	+46.854	6	
14	26	(United Kingdom) Max Chilton	Carlin	38	+50.205	11	
15	6	(France) Nathanaël Berthon	Racing Engineering	38	+55.440	16	
16	22	(Switzerland) Simon Trummer	Arden International	38	+55.707	17	
17	27	(Indonesia) Rio Haryanto	Carlin	38	+56.284	19	
18	8	(United Kingdom) Jolyon Palmer	iSport International	38	+1:02.119	21	
19	15	(Italy) Fabio Onidi	Scuderia Coloni	38	+1:08.223	5	
20	14	(Monaco) Stefano Coletti	Scuderia Coloni	38	+1:18.043	15	
21	17	(Colombia) Julián Leal	Trident Racing	38	+1:18.945	23	
22	18	(Spain) Sergio Canamasas	Venezuela GP Lazarus	38	+1:20.866	13	
23	11	(Venezuela) Rodolfo González	Caterham Racing	38	+1:30.712	24	
24	19	(Venezuela) Giancarlo Serenelli	Venezuela GP Lazarus	37	+1 Lap	26	
Ret	24	(Brazil) Victor Guerin	Ocean Racing Technology	27	Accident	8	
DSQ	20	(Portugal) Ricardo Teixeira	Rapax	18	Disqualified	25	
Fastest lap: Fabio Onidi (Scuderia Coloni) — 1:25.254 (on lap 31)

=== Sprint race ===
Pos.	No.	Driver	Team	Laps	Time/Retired	Grid	Points
1	9	(United Kingdom) James Calado	Lotus GP	27	40:18.134	1	17 (15+2)
2	12	(Netherlands) Giedo van der Garde	Caterham Racing	27	+7.962	4	12
3	4	(Brazil) Felipe Nasr	DAMS	27	+17.509	5	10
4	5	(Switzerland) Fabio Leimer	Racing Engineering	27	+21.962	7	8
5	10	(Mexico) Esteban Gutiérrez	Lotus GP	27	+22.353	10	6
6	1	(Venezuela) Johnny Cecotto Jr.	Barwa Addax Team	27	+33.193	8	4
7	3	(Italy) Davide Valsecchi	DAMS	27	+39.870	13	2
8	25	(Netherlands) Nigel Melker	Ocean Racing Technology	27	+41.861	3	1
9	6	(France) Nathanaël Berthon	Racing Engineering	27	+42.196	15	
10	23	(Brazil) Luiz Razia	Arden International	27	+42.442	2	
11	27	(Indonesia) Rio Haryanto	Carlin	27	+42.959	17	
12	17	(Colombia) Julián Leal	Trident Racing	27	+43.336	21	
13	2	(Czech Republic) Josef Král	Barwa Addax Team	27	+43.580	12	
14	18	(Spain) Sergio Canamasas	Venezuela GP Lazarus	27	+44.111	22	
15	7	(Sweden) Marcus Ericsson	iSport International	27	+46.002	11	
16	20	(Portugal) Ricardo Teixeira	Rapax	27	+46.683	26	
17	22	(Switzerland) Simon Trummer	Arden International	27	+47.624	16	
18	8	(United Kingdom) Jolyon Palmer	iSport International	27	+53.235	18	
19	14	(Monaco) Stefano Coletti	Scuderia Coloni	27	+54.660	20	
20	11	(Venezuela) Rodolfo González	Caterham Racing	27	+56.315	23	
21	16	(Monaco) Stéphane Richelmi	Trident Racing	27	+1:02.878	6	
22	15	(Italy) Fabio Onidi	Scuderia Coloni	27	+1:13.439	19	
23	24	(Brazil) Victor Guerin	Ocean Racing Technology	27	+1 Lap	25	
Ret	19	(Venezuela) Giancarlo Serenelli	Venezuela GP Lazarus	18	Retired	24	
Ret	21	(France) Tom Dillmann	Rapax	0	Accident	9	
Ret	26	(United Kingdom) Max Chilton	Carlin	0	Accident	14	
Fastest lap: Stéphane Richelmi (Trident Racing) — 1:25.760 (on lap 7)

== Standings after the round ==
Drivers' Championship standings

	Pos	Driver	Points
	1	(Brazil) Luiz Razia	171
	2	(Italy) Davide Valsecchi	161
	3	(Mexico) Esteban Gutiérrez	129
2	4	(Netherlands) Giedo van der Garde	119
1	5	(United Kingdom) James Calado	116

Teams' Championship standings

	Pos	Team	Points
	1	(France) Lotus GP	245
	2	(France) DAMS	227
	3	(United Kingdom) Arden International	175
2	4	(Spain) Racing Engineering	136
2	5	(Malaysia) Caterham Racing	125

- Note: Only the top five positions are included for both sets of standings.

== See also ==
- 2012 German Grand Prix
- 2012 Hockenheimring GP3 Series round

Previous round: 2012 Silverstone GP2 Series round	GP2 Series; 2012 season	Next round: 2012 Hungaroring GP2 Series round
Previous round: 2010 Hockenheimring GP2 Series round	Hockenheimring GP2 round	Next round: 2014 Hockenheimring GP2 Series round
