= Victor Guerin =

Victor Guerin may also refer to:

- Victor Guérin (1821–1891), French archaeologist
- Victor Guerin (racing driver) (born 1992), Brazilian racing driver
