= 2012 Monza GP2 Series round =

Motor racing competition

(Italy) 2012 Monza GP2 round
Round details
- Round 11 of 12 rounds in the 2012 GP2 Series
- Layout of the Autodromo Nazionale Monza
- Location: Autodromo Nazionale Monza, Monza, Italy
- Course: Permanent racing facility 5.793 km (3.600 mi)

GP2 Series

Feature race
- Date: 8 September 2012
- Laps: 30

Pole position
| Driver | (United Kingdom) Max Chilton | Marussia Carlin |
- Time: 1:31.886

Podium
| First | (Italy) Luca Filippi | Scuderia Coloni |
| Second | (Venezuela) Johnny Cecotto Jr. | Barwa Addax Team |
| Third | (Sweden) Marcus Ericsson | iSport International |

Fastest lap
| Driver | (Switzerland) Fabio Leimer | Racing Engineering |
- Time: 1:33.237 (on lap 30)

Sprint race
- Date: 9 September 2012
- Laps: 21

Podium
| First | (Italy) Davide Valsecchi | DAMS |
| Second | (Switzerland) Fabio Leimer | Racing Engineering |
| Third | (United Kingdom) Jolyon Palmer | iSport International |

Fastest lap
| Driver | (Italy) Davide Valsecchi | DAMS |
- Time: 1:33.536 (on lap 20)

The 2012 Monza GP2 Series round was a GP2 Series motor race held on September 8 and 9, 2012 at Autodromo Nazionale Monza, Italy. It was the penultimate round of the 2012 GP2 Series. The race supported the 2012 Italian Grand Prix.

GP2 championship contenders Luiz Razia and Davide Valsecchi both arrived at Monza with equal points. By the end of the meeting, Razia had failed to score in both races while Valsecchi finished sixth in the Feature race and won the Sprint race, which — combined with an extra two points for a fastest lap — gave him a twenty-five point lead going into the final round in Singapore.

== Classification ==
=== Qualifying ===
| Pos. | No. | Driver | Team | Time | Grid |
|---|---|---|---|---|---|
| 1 | 26 | (United Kingdom) Max Chilton | Marussia Carlin | 1:31.886 | 1 |
| 2 | 12 | (Netherlands) Giedo van der Garde | Caterham Racing | 1:31.953 | 2 |
| 3 | 1 | (Venezuela) Johnny Cecotto Jr. | Barwa Addax Team | 1:32.151 | 8 |
| 4 | 14 | (Italy) Luca Filippi | Scuderia Coloni | 1:32.165 | 3 |
| 5 | 3 | (Italy) Davide Valsecchi | DAMS | 1:32.208 | 4 |
| 6 | 7 | (Sweden) Marcus Ericsson | iSport International | 1:32.216 | 5 |
| 7 | 5 | (Switzerland) Fabio Leimer | Racing Engineering | 1:32.324 | 6 |
| 8 | 15 | (Italy) Fabio Onidi | Scuderia Coloni | 1:32.388 | 7 |
| 9 | 10 | (Mexico) Esteban Gutiérrez | Lotus GP | 1:32.396 | 9 |
| 10 | 4 | (Brazil) Felipe Nasr | DAMS | 1:32.462 | 10 |
| 11 | 27 | (Indonesia) Rio Haryanto | Marussia Carlin | 1:32.471 | 11 |
| 12 | 23 | (Brazil) Luiz Razia | Arden International | 1:32.495 | 12 |
| 13 | 9 | (United Kingdom) James Calado | Lotus GP | 1:32.622 | 13 |
| 14 | 25 | (Netherlands) Nigel Melker | Ocean Racing Technology | 1:32.625 | 14 |
| 15 | 8 | (United Kingdom) Jolyon Palmer | iSport International | 1:32.659 | 15 |
| 16 | 21 | (Monaco) Stefano Coletti | Rapax | 1:32.675 | 16 |
| 17 | 6 | (France) Nathanaël Berthon | Racing Engineering | 1:32.769 | 17 |
| 18 | 18 | (Spain) Sergio Canamasas | Venezuela GP Lazarus | 1:32.772 | 18 |
| 19 | 22 | (Switzerland) Simon Trummer | Arden International | 1:32.889 | 19 |
| 20 | 24 | (Brazil) Victor Guerin | Ocean Racing Technology | 1:32.911 | 20 |
| 21 | 19 | (Austria) René Binder | Venezuela GP Lazarus | 1:32.967 | 21 |
| 22 | 16 | (Monaco) Stéphane Richelmi | Trident Racing | 1:32.969 | 22 |
| 23 | 17 | (Colombia) Julián Leal | Trident Racing | 1:32.989 | 23 |
| 24 | 2 | (United States) Jake Rosenzweig | Barwa Addax Team | 1:33.109 | 24 |
| 25 | 11 | (Venezuela) Rodolfo González | Caterham Racing | 1:33.511 | 25 |
| 26 | 20 | (Portugal) Ricardo Teixeira | Rapax | 1:33.719 | 26 |

=== Feature race ===
| Pos. | No. | Driver | Team | Laps | Time/Retired | Grid | Points |
|---|---|---|---|---|---|---|---|
| 1 | 14 | (Italy) Luca Filippi | Scuderia Coloni | 30 | 48:03.604 | 3 | 25 |
| 2 | 1 | (Venezuela) Johnny Cecotto Jr. | Barwa Addax Team | 30 | +4.028 | 8 | 18 |
| 3 | 7 | (Sweden) Marcus Ericsson | iSport International | 30 | +5.377 | 5 | 15 |
| 4 | 26 | (United Kingdom) Max Chilton | Marussia Carlin | 30 | +7.631 | 1 | 12+4 |
| 5 | 5 | (Switzerland) Fabio Leimer | Racing Engineering | 30 | +9.413 | 6 | 10+2 |
| 6 | 3 | (Italy) Davide Valsecchi | DAMS | 30 | +16.057 | 4 | 8 |
| 7 | 8 | (United Kingdom) Jolyon Palmer | iSport International | 30 | +17.600 | 15 | 6 |
| 8 | 21 | (Monaco) Stefano Coletti | Rapax | 30 | +18.532 | 16 | 4 |
| 9 | 10 | (Mexico) Esteban Gutiérrez | Lotus GP | 30 | +19.293 | 9 | 2 |
| 10 | 17 | (Colombia) Julián Leal | Trident Racing | 30 | +20.025 | 23 | 1 |
| 11 | 25 | (Netherlands) Nigel Melker | Ocean Racing Technology | 30 | +20.464 | 14 | |
| 12 | 9 | (United Kingdom) James Calado | Lotus GP | 30 | +26.027 | 13 | |
| 13 | 16 | (Monaco) Stéphane Richelmi | Trident Racing | 30 | +27.890 | 22 | |
| 14 | 18 | (Spain) Sergio Canamasas | Venezuela GP Lazarus | 30 | +31.193 | 18 | |
| 15 | 6 | (France) Nathanaël Berthon | Racing Engineering | 30 | +31.910 | 17 | |
| 16 | 22 | (Switzerland) Simon Trummer | Arden International | 30 | +35.375 | 19 | |
| 17 | 19 | (Austria) René Binder | Venezuela GP Lazarus | 30 | +38.769 | 21 | |
| 18 | 2 | (United States) Jake Rosenzweig | Barwa Addax Team | 30 | +40.226 | 24 | |
| 19 | 27 | (Indonesia) Rio Haryanto | Marussia Carlin | 30 | +42.638 | 11 | |
| 20 | 20 | (Portugal) Ricardo Teixeira | Rapax | 30 | +43.152 | 26 | |
| 21 | 15 | (Italy) Fabio Onidi | Scuderia Coloni | 30 | +44.769 | 7 | |
| 22 | 11 | (Venezuela) Rodolfo González | Caterham Racing | 30 | +56.350 | 25 | |
| 23 | 24 | (Brazil) Victor Guerin | Ocean Racing Technology | 30 | +1:01.984 | 20 | |
| Ret | 4 | (Brazil) Felipe Nasr | DAMS | 13 | Retired | 10 | |
| Ret | 23 | (Brazil) Luiz Razia | Arden International | 0 | Retired | 12 | |
| Ret | 12 | (Netherlands) Giedo van der Garde | Caterham Racing | 0 | Retired | 2 | |
Fastest lap: Fabio Leimer (Racing Engineering) — 1:33.237 (on lap 30)

=== Sprint race ===
| Pos. | No. | Driver | Team | Laps | Time/Retired | Grid | Points |
|---|---|---|---|---|---|---|---|
| 1 | 3 | (Italy) Davide Valsecchi | DAMS | 21 | 33:06.731 | 3 | 15+2 |
| 2 | 5 | (Switzerland) Fabio Leimer | Racing Engineering | 21 | +0.444 | 4 | 12 |
| 3 | 8 | (United Kingdom) Jolyon Palmer | iSport International | 21 | +7.873 | 2 | 10 |
| 4 | 21 | (Monaco) Stefano Coletti | Rapax | 21 | +10.787 | 1 | 8 |
| 5 | 1 | (Venezuela) Johnny Cecotto Jr. | Barwa Addax Team | 21 | +10.953 | 7 | 6 |
| 6 | 26 | (United Kingdom) Max Chilton | Marussia Carlin | 21 | +11.418 | 5 | 4 |
| 7 | 7 | (Sweden) Marcus Ericsson | iSport International | 21 | +11.606 | 6 | 2 |
| 8 | 17 | (Colombia) Julián Leal | Trident Racing | 21 | +12.661 | 10 | 1 |
| 9 | 16 | (Monaco) Stéphane Richelmi | Trident Racing | 21 | +13.383 | 13 | |
| 10 | 12 | (Netherlands) Giedo van der Garde | Caterham Racing | 21 | +14.540 | 24 | |
| 11 | 18 | (Spain) Sergio Canamasas | Venezuela GP Lazarus | 21 | +15.013 | 14 | |
| 12 | 27 | (Indonesia) Rio Haryanto | Marussia Carlin | 21 | +15.711 | 19 | |
| 13 | 19 | (Austria) René Binder | Venezuela GP Lazarus | 21 | +15.934 | 17 | |
| 14 | 9 | (United Kingdom) James Calado | Lotus GP | 21 | +16.667 | 12 | |
| 15 | 6 | (France) Nathanaël Berthon | Racing Engineering | 21 | +20.179 | 15 | |
| 16 | 23 | (Brazil) Luiz Razia | Arden International | 21 | +20.484 | 26 | |
| 17 | 22 | (Switzerland) Simon Trummer | Arden International | 21 | +25.436 | 16 | |
| 18 | 20 | (Portugal) Ricardo Teixeira | Rapax | 21 | +29.051 | 20 | |
| 19 | 2 | (United States) Jake Rosenzweig | Barwa Addax Team | 21 | +30.292 | 18 | |
| 20 | 11 | (Venezuela) Rodolfo González | Caterham Racing | 21 | +34.034 | 22 | |
| 21 | 4 | (Brazil) Felipe Nasr | DAMS | 21 | +1:14.092 | 25^{1} | |
| 22 | 14 | (Italy) Luca Filippi | Scuderia Coloni | 21 | +1:26.253 | 8 | |
| Ret | 24 | (Brazil) Victor Guerin | Ocean Racing Technology | 1 | Retired | 23 | |
| Ret | 25 | (Netherlands) Nigel Melker | Ocean Racing Technology | 1 | Retired | 11 | |
| Ret | 15 | (Italy) Fabio Onidi | Scuderia Coloni | 1 | Retired | 21 | |
| Ret | 10 | (Mexico) Esteban Gutiérrez | Lotus GP | 1 | Retired | 10 | |
Fastest lap: Davide Valsecchi (DAMS) — 1:33.536 (on lap 20)

Notes:

- ^1 — Felipe Nasr and Luiz Razia each received five-place grid penalties for causing avoidable accidents during the Feature race.

== Standings after the round ==
Drivers' Championship standings

| | Pos. | Driver | Points |
|---|---|---|---|
| 1 | 1 | (Italy) Davide Valsecchi | 229 |
| 1 | 2 | (Brazil) Luiz Razia | 204 |
| | 3 | (United Kingdom) James Calado | 160 |
| | 4 | (Mexico) Esteban Gutiérrez | 152 |
| 1 | 5 | (United Kingdom) Max Chilton | 144 |

Teams' Championship standings

| | Pos. | Team | Points |
|---|---|---|---|
| 1 | 1 | (France) DAMS | 314 |
| 1 | 2 | (France) Lotus GP | 312 |
| | 3 | (United Kingdom) Arden International | 208 |
| 1 | 4 | (Spain) Racing Engineering | 186 |
| 1 | 5 | (United Kingdom) iSport International | 184 |

- Note: Only the top five positions are included for both sets of standings.

== See also ==
- 2012 Italian Grand Prix
- 2012 Monza GP3 Series round

| Previous round: 2012 Spa-Francorchamps GP2 round | GP2 Series; 2012 season | Next round: 2012 Marina Bay GP2 round |
| Previous round: 2011 Monza GP2 round | Monza GP2 round | Next round: 2013 Monza GP2 round |
