= 2012 Bahrain 2nd GP2 Series round =

2012 2nd Bahrain GP2 round
Round details
- Round 3 of 12 rounds in the 2012 GP2 Series
- Location: Bahrain International Circuit, Sakhir, Bahrain
- Course: Permanent racing facility 5.412 km (3.359 mi)

GP2 Series

Feature race
- Date: 27 April 2012
- Laps: 32

Pole position
Driver	(Netherlands) Giedo van der Garde	Caterham Racing
- Time: 1:42.451

Podium
First	(Italy) Davide Valsecchi	DAMS
Second	(Switzerland) Fabio Leimer	Racing Engineering
Third	(Netherlands) Giedo van der Garde	Caterham Racing

Fastest lap
Driver	(United Kingdom) James Calado (Note: James Calado set the fastest lap, but did not finish in the top 10, so was ineligible to be the point-scorer for the fastest lap. Davide Valsecchi was the point-scorer instead for setting the fastest lap of those finishing in the top 10.)	Lotus GP
- Time: 1:43.964 (on lap 28)

Sprint race
- Date: 28 April 2012
- Laps: 23

Podium
First	(France) Tom Dillmann	Rapax
Second	(Brazil) Luiz Razia	Arden International
Third	(Italy) Davide Valsecchi	DAMS

Fastest lap
Driver	(United Kingdom) Jolyon Palmer (Note: Jolyon Palmer set the fastest lap, but did not finish in the top 10, so was ineligible to be the point-scorer for the fastest lap. Luiz Razia was the point-scorer instead for setting the fastest lap of those finishing in the top 10.)	iSport International
- Time: 1:46.064 (on lap 2)

The 2012 Bahrain 2nd GP2 Series round was the third round of the 2012 GP2 Series. It was held on 27 and 28 April 2012 at Bahrain International Circuit, Bahrain. The first Bahrain round was held a week earlier.

Davide Valsecchi won the feature race, with Rapax driver Tom Dillmann taking his first GP2 Series win in the second sprint.

== Classification ==
=== Qualifying ===
Pos.	No.	Driver	Team	Time	Grid
1	12	(Netherlands) Giedo van der Garde	Caterham Racing	1:42.451	1
2	3	(Italy) Davide Valsecchi	DAMS	1:42.596	2
3	5	(Switzerland) Fabio Leimer	Racing Engineering	1:42.619	3
4	26	(United Kingdom) Max Chilton	Carlin	1:42.628	4
5	27	(Indonesia) Rio Haryanto	Carlin	1:42.691	5
6	23	(Brazil) Luiz Razia	Arden International	1:42.839	6
7	11	(Venezuela) Rodolfo González	Caterham Racing	1:42.951	7
8	2	(Spain) Dani Clos	Barwa Addax	1:43.080	8
9	7	(Sweden) Marcus Ericsson	iSport International	1:43.124	9
10	21	(France) Tom Dillmann	Rapax	1:43.163	10
11	4	(Brazil) Felipe Nasr	DAMS	1:43.172	11
12	14	(Monaco) Stefano Coletti	Scuderia Coloni	1:43.206	12
13	10	(Mexico) Esteban Gutiérrez	Lotus GP	1:43.213	13
14	24	(New Zealand) Brendon Hartley	Ocean Racing Technology	1:43.219	14
15	18	(Italy) Fabrizio Crestani	Venezuela GP Lazarus	1:43.311	15
16	6	(France) Nathanaël Berthon	Racing Engineering	1:43.328	16
17	8	(United Kingdom) Jolyon Palmer	iSport International	1:43.391	17
18	14	(Italy) Fabio Onidi	Scuderia Coloni	1:43.447	18
19	25	(Netherlands) Nigel Melker	Ocean Racing Technology	1:43.453	19
20	1	(Venezuela) Johnny Cecotto Jr.	Barwa Addax	1:43.599	20
21	17	(Colombia) Julián Leal	Trident Racing	1:43.659	21
22	9	(United Kingdom) James Calado	Lotus GP	1:43.757	22
23	22	(Switzerland) Simon Trummer	Arden International	1:43.929	23
24	16	(Monaco) Stéphane Richelmi	Trident Racing	1:44.100	24
25	20	(Portugal) Ricardo Teixeira	Rapax	1:44.850	25
26	19	(Venezuela) Giancarlo Serenelli	Venezuela GP Lazarus	1:45.036	26

=== Feature race ===
Pos.	No.	Driver	Team	Laps	Time/Retired	Grid	Points
1	3	(Italy) Davide Valsecchi	DAMS	32	57:35.088	2	27 (25+2)
2	5	(Switzerland) Fabio Leimer	Racing Engineering	32	+7.711	3	18
3	12	(Netherlands) Giedo van der Garde	Caterham Racing	32	+14.824	1	19 (15+4)
4	23	(Brazil) Luiz Razia	Arden International	32	+24.142	6	12
5	26	(United Kingdom) Max Chilton	Carlin	32	+24.705	4	10
6	27	(Indonesia) Rio Haryanto	Carlin	32	+40.965	5	8
7	7	(Sweden) Marcus Ericsson	iSport International	32	+50.645	9	6
8	21	(France) Tom Dillmann	Rapax	32	+52.522	10	4
9	1	(Venezuela) Johnny Cecotto Jr.	Barwa Addax	32	+55.578	20	2
10	10	(Mexico) Esteban Gutiérrez	Lotus GP	32	+56.211	13	1
11	4	(Brazil) Felipe Nasr	DAMS	32	+1:05.772^{7}	11	
12	6	(France) Nathanaël Berthon	Racing Engineering	32	+1:06.906	16	
13	24	(New Zealand) Brendon Hartley	Ocean Racing Technology	32	+1:07.254	14	
14	22	(Switzerland) Simon Trummer	Arden International	32	+1:15.486	23	
15	17	(Colombia) Julián Leal	Trident Racing	32	+1:16.363	21	
16	9	(United Kingdom) James Calado	Lotus GP	32	+1:20.506	22	
17	16	(Monaco) Stéphane Richelmi	Trident Racing	32	+1:21.441	24	
18	11	(Venezuela) Rodolfo González	Caterham Racing	32	+1:29.206^{7}	7	
19	25	(Netherlands) Nigel Melker	Ocean Racing Technology	32	+1:29.955	19	
20	14	(Italy) Fabio Onidi	Scuderia Coloni	32	+1:47.146	18	
21	14	(Monaco) Stefano Coletti	Scuderia Coloni	31	+1 lap	12	
22	19	(Venezuela) Giancarlo Serenelli	Venezuela GP Lazarus	31	+1 lap	26	
23	20	(Portugal) Ricardo Teixeira	Rapax	31	+1 lap	25	
24	8	(United Kingdom) Jolyon Palmer	iSport International	30	Retired^{8}	17	
Ret	18	(Italy) Fabrizio Crestani	Venezuela GP Lazarus	24	Retired	15	
Ret	2	(Spain) Dani Clos	Barwa Addax	8	Retired	8	
Fastest lap: James Calado (Lotus GP) — 1:43.964 (lap 28)

Notes:

- ^7 — Felipe Nasr and Rodolfo González were both issued with twenty-second time penalties after the race for ignoring yellow flags.
- ^8 — Jolyon Palmer was classified as having finished the race, as he had completed 90% of the winners race distance.

=== Sprint race ===
Pos.	No.	Driver	Team	Laps	Time/Retired	Grid	Points
1	21	(France) Tom Dillmann	Rapax	23	41:16.276	1	15
2	23	(Brazil) Luiz Razia	Arden International	23	+0.198	5	14 (12+2)
3	3	(Italy) Davide Valsecchi	DAMS	23	+3.958	8	10
4	10	(Mexico) Esteban Gutiérrez	Lotus GP	23	+16.488	10	8
5	4	(Brazil) Felipe Nasr	DAMS	23	+18.602	11	6
6	27	(Indonesia) Rio Haryanto	Carlin	23	+20.425	3	4
7	7	(Sweden) Marcus Ericsson	iSport International	23	+26.294	2	2
8	5	(Switzerland) Fabio Leimer	Racing Engineering	23	+29.605	7	1
9	14	(Italy) Fabio Onidi	Scuderia Coloni	23	+33.490	20	
10	6	(France) Nathanaël Berthon	Racing Engineering	23	+34.078	12	
11	25	(Netherlands) Nigel Melker	Ocean Racing Technology	23	+43.463	19	
12	9	(United Kingdom) James Calado	Lotus GP	23	+44.371	16	
13	26	(United Kingdom) Max Chilton	Carlin	23	+46.743	4	
14	17	(Colombia) Julián Leal	Trident Racing	23	+47.439	15	
15	11	(Venezuela) Rodolfo González	Caterham Racing	23	+54.991	18	
16	24	(New Zealand) Brendon Hartley	Ocean Racing Technology	23	+59.764	13	
17	16	(Monaco) Stéphane Richelmi	Trident Racing	23	+1:00.655	17	
18	14	(Monaco) Stefano Coletti	Scuderia Coloni	23	+1:02.090	21	
19	12	(Netherlands) Giedo van der Garde	Caterham Racing	23	+1:02.632	6	
20	20	(Portugal) Ricardo Teixeira	Rapax	23	+1:07.468	23	
21	19	(Venezuela) Giancarlo Serenelli	Venezuela GP Lazarus	23	+1:08.293	22	
22	8	(United Kingdom) Jolyon Palmer	iSport International	23	+1:18.688	24	
23	18	(Italy) Fabrizio Crestani	Venezuela GP Lazarus	23	+1:26.049	26^{9}	
24	22	(Switzerland) Simon Trummer	Arden International	21	Retired^{10}	14	
Ret	2	(Spain) Dani Clos	Barwa Addax	19	Retired	25	
Ret	1	(Venezuela) Johnny Cecotto Jr.	Barwa Addax	0	Retired	9	
Fastest lap: Jolyon Palmer (iSport International) — 1:46.064 (lap 2)

Notes:

- ^9 — Fabrizio Crestani was given a five grid position penalty for ignoring yellow flags during Feature race.
- ^10 — Simon Trummer was classified as having finished the race, as he had completed 90% of the winners race distance.

== Standings after the round ==
Drivers' Championship standings

	Pos	Driver	Points
	1	(Italy) Davide Valsecchi	107
	2	(Brazil) Luiz Razia	83
	3	(Mexico) Esteban Gutiérrez	54
1	4	(United Kingdom) Max Chilton	45
2	5	(Switzerland) Fabio Leimer	41

Teams' Championship standings

Pos	Team	Points
1	(France) DAMS	135
2	(France) Lotus GP	93
3	(United Kingdom) Arden International	84
4	(United Kingdom) Carlin	61
5	(Spain) Racing Engineering	42

- Note: Only the top five positions are included for both sets of standings.

== Notes ==
Previous round: 2012 Bahrain 1st GP2 round	GP2 Series; 2012 season	Next round: 2012 Catalunya GP2 round
Previous round: 2007 Bahrain GP2 round	Bahrain GP2 round	Next round: 2013 Bahrain GP2 round
