= 2011 Valencia GP2 Series round =

2011 GP2 race held in Spain

(Spain) 2011 Valencia GP2 round
Round details
- Round 4 of 9 rounds in the 2011 GP2 Series
- Circuit de Valencia
- Location: Valencia Street Circuit; Valencia, Spain
- Course: Permanent racing facility 5.34 km (3.32 mi)

GP2 Series

Feature race
- Date: 25 June 2011
- Laps: 32

Pole position
Driver	(France) Charles Pic	Barwa Addax Team
- Time: 1:46.675

Podium
First	(France) Romain Grosjean	DAMS
Second	(Netherlands) Giedo van der Garde	Barwa Addax Team
Third	(Italy) Davide Valsecchi	Caterham Team AirAsia

Fastest lap
Driver	(France) Romain Grosjean	Barwa Addax Team
- Time: 1:49.591 (on lap 20)

Sprint race
- Date: 26 June 2011
- Laps: 23

Podium
First	(Mexico) Esteban Gutiérrez	Lotus ART
Second	(Brazil) Luiz Razia	Caterham Team AirAsia
Third	(Netherlands) Giedo van der Garde	Barwa Addax Team

Fastest lap
Driver	(Mexico) Esteban Gutiérrez	Lotus ART
- Time: 1:49.916 (on lap 9)

The 2011 Valencia GP2 Series round was the fourth round of the 2011 GP2 Series season. It was held on June 24–26, 2011 at Valencia Street Circuit, Valencia, Spain, supporting the 2011 European Grand Prix.

== Classification ==
=== Qualifying ===
Pos	No.	Driver	Team	Time	Grid
1	3	(France) Charles Pic	Barwa Addax Team	1:46.675	1
2	4	(Netherlands) Giedo van der Garde	Barwa Addax Team	1:46.727	2
3	11	(France) Romain Grosjean	DAMS	1:46.771	3
4	17	(Italy) Luca Filippi	Super Nova Racing	1:46.953	4
5	6	(Mexico) Esteban Gutiérrez	Lotus ART	1:46.995	5
6	9	(United Kingdom) Sam Bird	iSport International	1:47.016	6
7	7	(Spain) Dani Clos	Racing Engineering	1:47.041	7
8	27	(Italy) Davide Valsecchi	Caterham Team AirAsia	1:47.129	8
9	5	(France) Jules Bianchi	Lotus ART	1:47.337	9
10	10	(Sweden) Marcus Ericsson	iSport International	1:47.417	10
11	26	(Brazil) Luiz Razia	Caterham Team AirAsia	1:47.418	11
12	24	(United Kingdom) Max Chilton	Carlin	1:47.451	12
13	25	(Portugal) Álvaro Parente	Carlin	1:47.752	13
14	12	(Norway) Pål Varhaug	DAMS	1:47.802	14
15	8	(Germany) Christian Vietoris	Racing Engineering	1:47.875	15
16	21	(Monaco) Stefano Coletti	Trident Racing	1:47.963	16
17	15	(United Kingdom) Jolyon Palmer	Arden International	1:48.032	17
18	18	(Romania) Michael Herck	Scuderia Coloni	1:48.056	18
19	1	(Switzerland) Fabio Leimer	Rapax	1:48.234	19
20	23	(Venezuela) Johnny Cecotto Jr.	Ocean Racing Technology	1:48.337	20
21	16	(Malaysia) Fairuz Fauzy	Super Nova Racing	1:48.527	21
22	14	(Czech Republic) Josef Král	Arden International	1:48.601	22
23	19	(Italy) Kevin Ceccon	Scuderia Coloni	1:48.631	23
24	20	(Venezuela) Rodolfo González	Trident Racing	1:48.716	24
25	2	(Italy) Julián Leal	Rapax	1:48.768	25
26	22	(Germany) Kevin Mirocha	Ocean Racing Technology	1:48.972	26

=== Feature Race ===
Pos	No.	Driver	Team	Laps	Time/Retired	Grid	Points
1	11	(France) Romain Grosjean	DAMS	30	58:19.400	3	10+1
2	4	(Netherlands) Giedo van der Garde	Barwa Addax Team	30	+15.481	2	8
3	27	(Italy) Davide Valsecchi	Caterham Team AirAsia	30	+20.901	8	6
4	7	(Spain) Dani Clos	Racing Engineering	30	+24.010	7	5
5	9	(United Kingdom) Sam Bird	iSport International	30	+24.323	6	4
6	26	(Brazil) Luiz Razia	Caterham Team AirAsia	30	+24.495	11	3
7	6	(Mexico) Esteban Gutiérrez	Lotus ART	30	+48.097	5	2
8	14	(Czech Republic) Josef Král	Arden International	30	+51.064	22	1
9	15	(United Kingdom) Jolyon Palmer	Arden International	30	+53.632	17	
10	18	(Romania) Michael Herck	Scuderia Coloni	30	+57.032	18	
11	2	(Italy) Julián Leal	Rapax	30	+58.041	25	
12	22	(Germany) Kevin Mirocha	Ocean Racing Technology	30	+58.567	26	
13	12	(Norway) Pål Varhaug	DAMS	30	+1:06.416	14	
14	23	(Venezuela) Johnny Cecotto Jr.	Ocean Racing Technology	30	+1:12.085	20	
15	20	(Venezuela) Rodolfo González	Trident Racing	30	+1:20.090	24	
16	16	(Malaysia) Fairuz Fauzy	Super Nova Racing	30	+1:25.296	21	
17	21	(Monaco) Stefano Coletti	Trident Racing	30	+1:44.986	16	
18	19	(Italy) Kevin Ceccon	Scuderia Coloni	29	+1 lap	23	
Ret	24	(United Kingdom) Max Chilton	Carlin	23	Retirement	12	
Ret	8	(Germany) Christian Vietoris	Racing Engineering	15	Retirement	15	
Ret	17	(Italy) Luca Filippi	Super Nova Racing	14	Accident	4	
Ret	3	(France) Charles Pic	Barwa Addax Team	13	Retirement	1	2
Ret	10	(Sweden) Marcus Ericsson	iSport International	0	Collision	10	
Ret	1	(Switzerland) Fabio Leimer	Rapax	0	Collision	19	
Ret	5	(France) Jules Bianchi	Lotus ART	0	Collision	9	
Ret	25	(Portugal) Álvaro Parente	Carlin	0	Collision	13	
Fastest lap: Romain Grosjean (DAMS) 1:49.591 (lap 20)

=== Sprint Race ===
Pos	No.	Driver	Team	Laps	Time/Retired	Grid	Points
1	6	(Mexico) Esteban Gutiérrez	Lotus ART	23	43:34.905	2	6+1
2	26	(Brazil) Luiz Razia	Caterham Team AirAsia	23	+12.995	3	5
3	4	(Netherlands) Giedo van der Garde	Barwa Addax Team	23	+13.842	7	4
4	27	(Italy) Davide Valsecchi	Caterham Team AirAsia	23	+26.633	6	3
5	7	(Spain) Dani Clos	Racing Engineering	23	+30.130	5	2
6	18	(Romania) Michael Herck	Scuderia Coloni	23	+30.374	10	1
7	5	(France) Jules Bianchi	Lotus ART	23	+34.651	24^{1}	
8	22	(Germany) Kevin Mirocha	Ocean Racing Technology	23	+34.677	12	
9	2	(Italy) Julián Leal	Rapax	23	+36.728	11	
10	12	(Norway) Pål Varhaug	DAMS	23	+37.615	23^{1}	
11	10	(Sweden) Marcus Ericsson	iSport International	23	+40.932	21	
12	9	(United Kingdom) Sam Bird	iSport International	23	+42.599	4	
13	8	(Germany) Christian Vietoris	Racing Engineering	23	+44.840	19	
14	1	(Switzerland) Fabio Leimer	Rapax	23	+46.014	25^{1}	
15	17	(Italy) Luca Filippi	Super Nova Racing	23	+46.777	26^{1}	
16	16	(Malaysia) Fairuz Fauzy	Super Nova Racing	23	+57.433	15	
17	23	(Venezuela) Johnny Cecotto Jr.	Ocean Racing Technology	23	+1:08.309	13	
18	25	(Portugal) Álvaro Parente	Carlin	23	+1:11.936	22	
19	21	(Monaco) Stefano Coletti	Trident Racing	21	Retirement	16	
20	19	(Italy) Kevin Ceccon	Scuderia Coloni	21	Retirement	17	
Ret	14	(Czech Republic) Josef Král	Arden International	14	Retirement	1	
Ret	15	(United Kingdom) Jolyon Palmer	Arden International	14	Retirement	9	
Ret	24	(United Kingdom) Max Chilton	Carlin	3	Retirement	18	
Ret	11	(France) Romain Grosjean	DAMS	0	Collision	8	
Ret	20	(Venezuela) Rodolfo González	Trident Racing	0	Collision	14	
Ret	3	(France) Charles Pic	Barwa Addax Team	0	Collision	20	
Fastest lap: Esteban Gutiérrez (Lotus ART) 1:49.916 (lap 9)

Notes

1. – Bianchi, Leimer, Filippi and Varhaug were given a ten grid position penalty for causing avoidable collisions during Feature Race.

== Standings after the round ==
Drivers' Championship standings

Pos	Driver	Points
1	(France) Romain Grosjean	34
2	(Netherlands) Giedo van der Garde	33
3	(Italy) Davide Valsecchi	30
4	(United Kingdom) Sam Bird	27
5	(France) Charles Pic	24

Teams' Championship standings

Pos	Team	Points
1	(Spain) Barwa Addax Team	57
2	(Malaysia) Caterham Team AirAsia	41
3	(United Kingdom) iSport International	35
4	(France) DAMS	34
5	(Spain) Racing Engineering	24

- Note: Only the top five positions are included for both sets of standings.

== See also ==
- 2011 European Grand Prix
- 2011 Valencia GP3 Series round

Previous round: 2011 Monaco GP2 round	GP2 Series; 2011 season	Next round: 2011 British GP2 round
Previous round: 2010 Valencia GP2 Series round	Valencia GP2 round	Next round: 2012 Valencia GP2 Series round
