= 2012 Bahrain 1st GP2 Series round =

Car racing competition

2012 1st Bahrain GP2 round
Round details
- Round 2 of 12 rounds in the 2012 GP2 Series
- Location: Bahrain International Circuit, Sakhir, Bahrain
- Course: Permanent racing facility 5.412 km (3.359 mi)

GP2 Series

Feature race
- Date: 21 April 2012
- Laps: 32

Pole position
Driver	(Italy) Davide Valsecchi	DAMS
- Time: 1:41.200

Podium
First	(Italy) Davide Valsecchi	DAMS
Second	(Brazil) Luiz Razia	Arden International
Third	(Mexico) Esteban Gutiérrez	Lotus GP

Fastest lap
Driver	(Italy) Davide Valsecchi	DAMS
- Time: 1:44.380 (on lap 25)

Sprint race
- Date: 22 April 2012
- Laps: 23

Podium
First	(Italy) Davide Valsecchi	DAMS
Second	(Mexico) Esteban Gutiérrez	Lotus GP
Third	(United Kingdom) James Calado	Lotus GP

Fastest lap
Driver	(Netherlands) Giedo van der Garde	Caterham Racing
- Time: 1:45.650 (on lap 3)

The 2012 Bahrain 1st GP2 Series round was the second round of the 2012 GP2 Series. It was held on 21 and 22 April 2012 at Bahrain International Circuit, Bahrain. The race supported the 2012 Bahrain Grand Prix. The second round was held one week later as an independent round of the championship, the only one of its kind on the 2012 calendar.

The rounds were the first time the GP2 Series has visited the Bahrain International Circuit since 2007. The circuit was a regular fixture on the calendar of the now-defunct GP2 Asia Series from its inception in 2008 until 2011, when the race was cancelled due to anti-government protests. With the GP2 Asia series being discontinued at the end of the 2011 season and merged into its parent series, the Bahrain International Circuit returned to the larger GP2 Series as part of the series' expansion to include fly-away rounds.

In the week before the first race, Barwa Addax driver Josef Král was replaced by Dani Clos. Brendon Hartley also replaced Ocean Racing Technology's Jon Lancaster.

DAMS driver Davide Valsecchi qualified on pole for the first feature race, and won both the feature and sprint races.

The first race was also the first time that the series introduced the points system used by Formula One since 2010 for the feature race, with points awarded to the top ten drivers and twenty-five points awarded to the race winner. The points for the sprint race were changed too, with the winner receiving fifteen points and the top eight drivers scoring points. The points for pole and fastest lap were doubled as well.

== Classification ==
=== Qualifying ===
Pos.	No.	Driver	Team	Time	Grid
1	3	(Italy) Davide Valsecchi	DAMS	1:41.200	1
2	10	(Mexico) Esteban Gutiérrez	Lotus GP	1:41.479	2
3	4	(Brazil) Felipe Nasr	DAMS	1:41.785	3
4	5	(Switzerland) Fabio Leimer	Racing Engineering	1:41.798	4
5	1	(Venezuela) Johnny Cecotto Jr.	Barwa Addax Team	1:41.858	5
6	16	(Monaco) Stéphane Richelmi	Trident Racing	1:41.862	6
7	7	(Sweden) Marcus Ericsson	iSport International	1:41.933	17^{1}
8	9	(United Kingdom) James Calado	Lotus GP	1:41.939	7
9	23	(Brazil) Luiz Razia	Arden International	1:41.962	8
10	26	(United Kingdom) Max Chilton	Carlin	1:41.980	9
11	27	(Indonesia) Rio Haryanto	Carlin	1:42.097	10
12	12	(Netherlands) Giedo van der Garde	Caterham Racing	1:42.139	11
13	8	(United Kingdom) Jolyon Palmer	iSport International	1:42.156	12
14	2	(Spain) Dani Clos	Barwa Addax Team	1:42.158	13
15	21	(France) Tom Dillmann	Rapax	1:42.190	14
16	15	(Italy) Fabio Onidi	Scuderia Coloni	1:42.374	15
17	11	(Venezuela) Rodolfo González	Caterham Racing	1:42.409	16
18	6	(France) Nathanaël Berthon	Racing Engineering	1:42.427	18
19	17	(Colombia) Julián Leal	Trident Racing	1:42.456	19
20	18	(Italy) Fabrizio Crestani	Venezuela GP Lazarus	1:42.706	20
21	24	(New Zealand) Brendon Hartley	Ocean Racing Technology	1:42.782	26^{2}
22	14	(Monaco) Stefano Coletti	Scuderia Coloni	1:42.853	21
23	25	(Netherlands) Nigel Melker	Ocean Racing Technology	1:42.895	22
24	22	(Switzerland) Simon Trummer	Arden International	1:43.014	23
25	19	(Venezuela) Giancarlo Serenelli	Venezuela GP Lazarus	1:43.907	24
26	20	(Portugal) Ricardo Teixeira	Rapax	1:44.078	25

Notes:

- ^1 — Marcus Ericsson was given a ten-place grid penalty for causing an avoidable accident with Davide Valsecchi at Sepang.
- ^2 — Brendon Hartley received a five-place grid penalty for causing a collision with Giedo van der Garde during the qualifying session.

=== Feature Race ===
Pos.	No.	Driver	Team	Laps	Time/Retired	Grid	Points
1	3	(Italy) Davide Valsecchi	DAMS	32	59:31.115	1	31 (25+4+2)
2	23	(Brazil) Luiz Razia	Arden International	32	+7.770	8	18
3	10	(Mexico) Esteban Gutiérrez	Lotus GP	32	+13.528	2	15
4	26	(United Kingdom) Max Chilton	Carlin	32	+14.088	9	12
5	9	(United Kingdom) James Calado	Lotus GP	32	+16.278	7	10
6	21	(France) Tom Dillmann	Rapax	32	+16.559	14	8
7	5	(Switzerland) Fabio Leimer	Racing Engineering	32	+17.243	4	6
8	15	(Italy) Fabio Onidi	Scuderia Coloni	32	+28.109	15	4
9	27	(Indonesia) Rio Haryanto	Carlin	32	+32.846	10	2
10	24	(New Zealand) Brendon Hartley	Ocean Racing Technology	32	+36.093	26	1
11	16	(Monaco) Stéphane Richelmi	Trident Racing	32	+37.377	6	
12	17	(Colombia) Julián Leal	Trident Racing	32	+38.677	19	
13	7	(Sweden) Marcus Ericsson	iSport International	32	+40.627	17	
14	18	(Italy) Fabrizio Crestani	Venezuela GP Lazarus	32	+41.009	20	
15	11	(Venezuela) Rodolfo González	Caterham Racing	32	+44.028	16	
16	22	(Switzerland) Simon Trummer	Arden International	32	+44.552	23	
17	20	(Portugal) Ricardo Teixeira	Rapax	32	+47.776	25	
18	19	(Venezuela) Giancarlo Serenelli	Venezuela GP Lazarus	32	+52.464	24	
19	2	(Spain) Dani Clos	Barwa Addax Team	30	Brakes^{3}	13	
20	25	(Netherlands) Nigel Melker	Ocean Racing Technology	30	Accident damage^{3}	22	
21	6	(France) Nathanaël Berthon	Racing Engineering	29	Accident damage^{3}	18	
Ret	1	(Venezuela) Johnny Cecotto Jr.	Barwa Addax Team	16	Collision	5	
Ret	4	(Brazil) Felipe Nasr	DAMS	16	Collision	3	
Ret	12	(Netherlands) Giedo van der Garde	Caterham Racing	16	Accident damage	11	
Ret	14	(Monaco) Stefano Coletti	Scuderia Coloni	2	Collision	21	
DNS	8	(United Kingdom) Jolyon Palmer	iSport International		Electrical	12	
Fastest lap: Davide Valsecchi (DAMS) — 1:44.380 (lap 25)

Notes:

- ^3 — Dani Clos, Nigel Melker and Nathanaël Berthon were classified as having finished the race, as they had completed 90% of the winners race distance.

=== Sprint race ===
Pos.	No.	Driver	Team	Laps	Time/Retired	Grid	Points
1	3	(Italy) Davide Valsecchi	DAMS	22	39:22.363	8	15
2	10	(Mexico) Esteban Gutiérrez	Lotus GP	22	+0.399	6	12
3	9	(United Kingdom) James Calado	Lotus GP	22	+10.617	4	10
4	23	(Brazil) Luiz Razia	Arden International	22	+12.463	7	8
5	26	(United Kingdom) Max Chilton	Carlin	22	+13.573	5	6
6	4	(Brazil) Felipe Nasr	DAMS	22	+15.414	26^{4}	4
7	8	(United Kingdom) Jolyon Palmer	iSport International	22	+22.950	25	2
8	22	(Switzerland) Simon Trummer	Arden International	22	+30.425	16	1
9	12	(Netherlands) Giedo van der Garde	Caterham Racing	22	+31.976	23	2
10	21	(France) Tom Dillmann	Rapax	22	+32.545	3^{7}	
11	2	(Spain) Dani Clos	Barwa Addax Team	22	+32.632	19	
12	5	(Switzerland) Fabio Leimer	Racing Engineering	22	+32.856	2	
13	20	(Portugal) Ricardo Teixeira	Rapax	22	+36.275	17	
14	15	(Italy) Fabio Onidi	Scuderia Coloni	22	+36.477	1	
15	27	(Indonesia) Rio Haryanto	Carlin	22	+39.988	9	
16	7	(Sweden) Marcus Ericsson	iSport International	22	+40.386	13	
17	17	(Colombia) Julián Leal	Trident Racing	22	+47.410	12	
18	25	(Netherlands) Nigel Melker	Ocean Racing Technology	22	+56.196	20	
19	18	(Italy) Fabrizio Crestani	Venezuela GP Lazarus	22	+59.488	14	
20	19	(Venezuela) Giancarlo Serenelli	Venezuela GP Lazarus	22	+1:53.295	18	
21	11	(Venezuela) Rodolfo González	Caterham Racing	22	+2:12.968^{5}	15	
22	1	(Venezuela) Johnny Cecotto Jr.	Barwa Addax Team	21	Retired^{6}	22	
23	14	(Monaco) Stefano Coletti	Scuderia Coloni	20	Retired^{6}	24	
Ret	6	(France) Nathanaël Berthon	Racing Engineering	15	Retired	21	
Ret	24	(New Zealand) Brendon Hartley	Ocean Racing Technology	2	Retired	10	
Ret	16	(Monaco) Stéphane Richelmi	Trident Racing	0	Retired	11	
Fastest lap: Giedo van der Garde (Caterham Racing) — 1:45.650 (lap 3)

Notes:

- ^4 — Felipe Nasr was given a five-place grid penalty for causing an avoidable collision with Johnny Cecotto Jr. in the feature race. He later started from the pit lane.
- ^5 — Rodolfo González received a post-race 20-second penalty.
- ^6 — Johnny Cecotto Jr. and Stefano Coletti were both classified as having finished the race, as they had completed 90% of the winners race distance.
- ^7 — Tom Dillmann started from the pit lane.

== Standings after the round ==
Drivers' Championship standings

	Pos	Driver	Points
1	1	(Italy) Davide Valsecchi	70
1	2	(Brazil) Luiz Razia	57
1	3	(Mexico) Esteban Gutiérrez	45
1	4	(United Kingdom) James Calado	35
1	5	(United Kingdom) Max Chilton	22

Teams' Championship standings

Pos	Team	Points
1	(France) DAMS	92
2	(France) Lotus GP	84
3	(United Kingdom) Arden International	58
4	(United Kingdom) Carlin	39
5	(Spain) Racing Engineering	23

- Note: Only the top five positions are included for both sets of standings.

Previous round: 2012 Sepang GP2 round	GP2 Series; 2012 season	Next round: 2012 2nd Bahrain GP2 round
Previous round: 2010 2nd Bahrain GP2 Asia Series round	Bahrain GP2 round	Next round: 2013 Bahrain GP2 round
