= 2012 Sepang GP2 Series round =

(Malaysia) 2012 Sepang GP2 round
Round details
- Round 1 of 12 rounds in the 2012 GP2 Series
- Location: Sepang International Circuit, Kuala Lumpur, Malaysia
- Course: Permanent racing facility 5.543 km (3.444 mi)

GP2 Series

Feature race
- Date: 24 March 2012
- Laps: 30

Pole position
Driver	(Italy) Davide Valsecchi	DAMS
- Time: 1:45.494

Podium
First	(Brazil) Luiz Razia	Arden International
Second	(Italy) Davide Valsecchi	DAMS
Third	(United Kingdom) Max Chilton	Carlin

Fastest lap
Driver	(Italy) Davide Valsecchi	DAMS
- Time: 1:49.246 (on lap 24)

Sprint race
- Date: 25 March 2012
- Laps: 22

Podium
First	(United Kingdom) James Calado	Lotus GP
Second	(Mexico) Esteban Gutiérrez	Lotus GP
Third	(Brazil) Felipe Nasr	DAMS

Fastest lap
Driver	(Italy) Fabrizio Crestani (Note: Fabrizio Crestani set the fastest lap, but did not finish in the top 10, so was ineligible to be the point-scorer for the fastest lap. Rio Haryanto was the point-scorer instead for setting the fastest lap of those finishing in the top 10.)	Venezuela GP Lazarus
- Time: 1:50.690 (on lap 8)

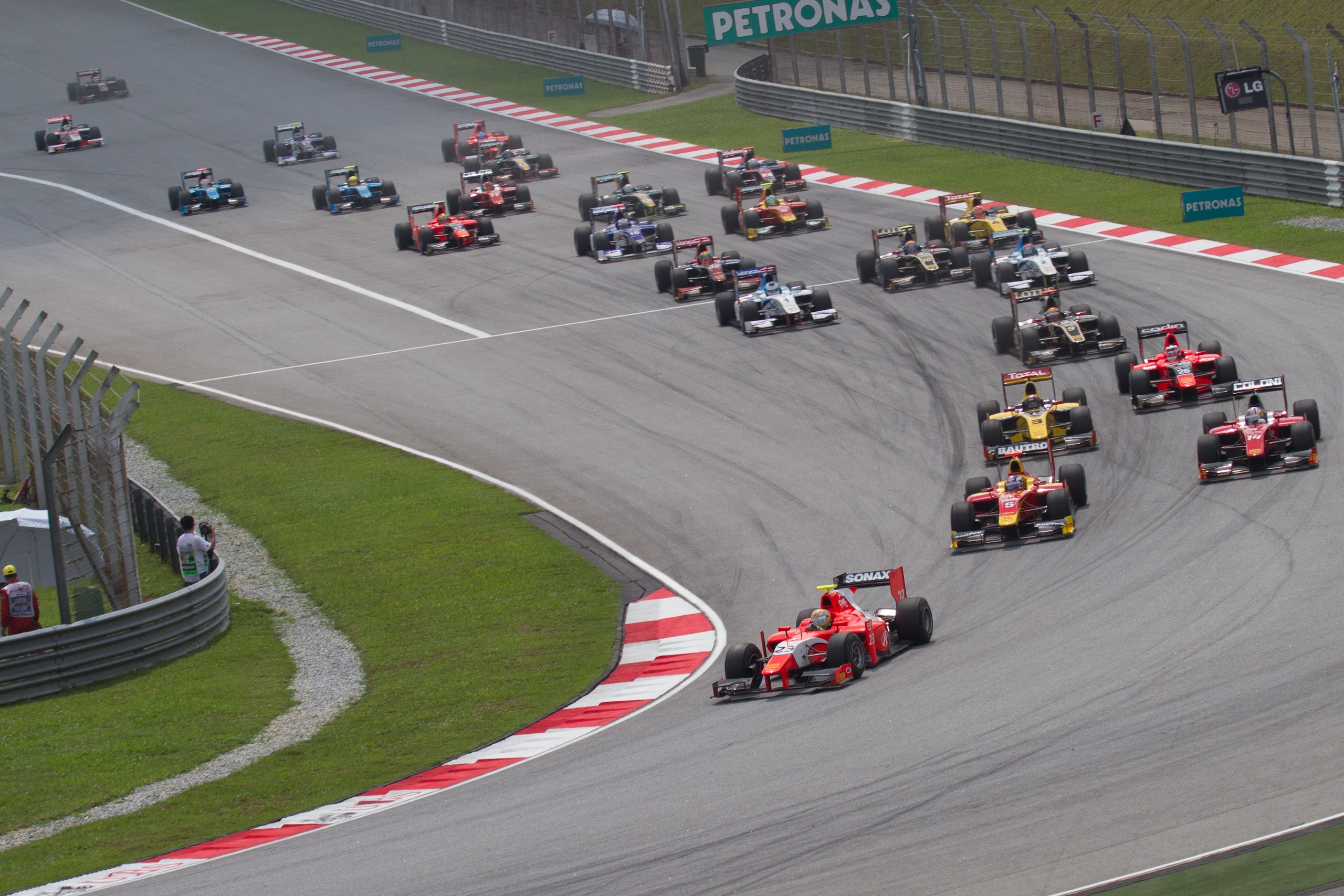
Feature race start.

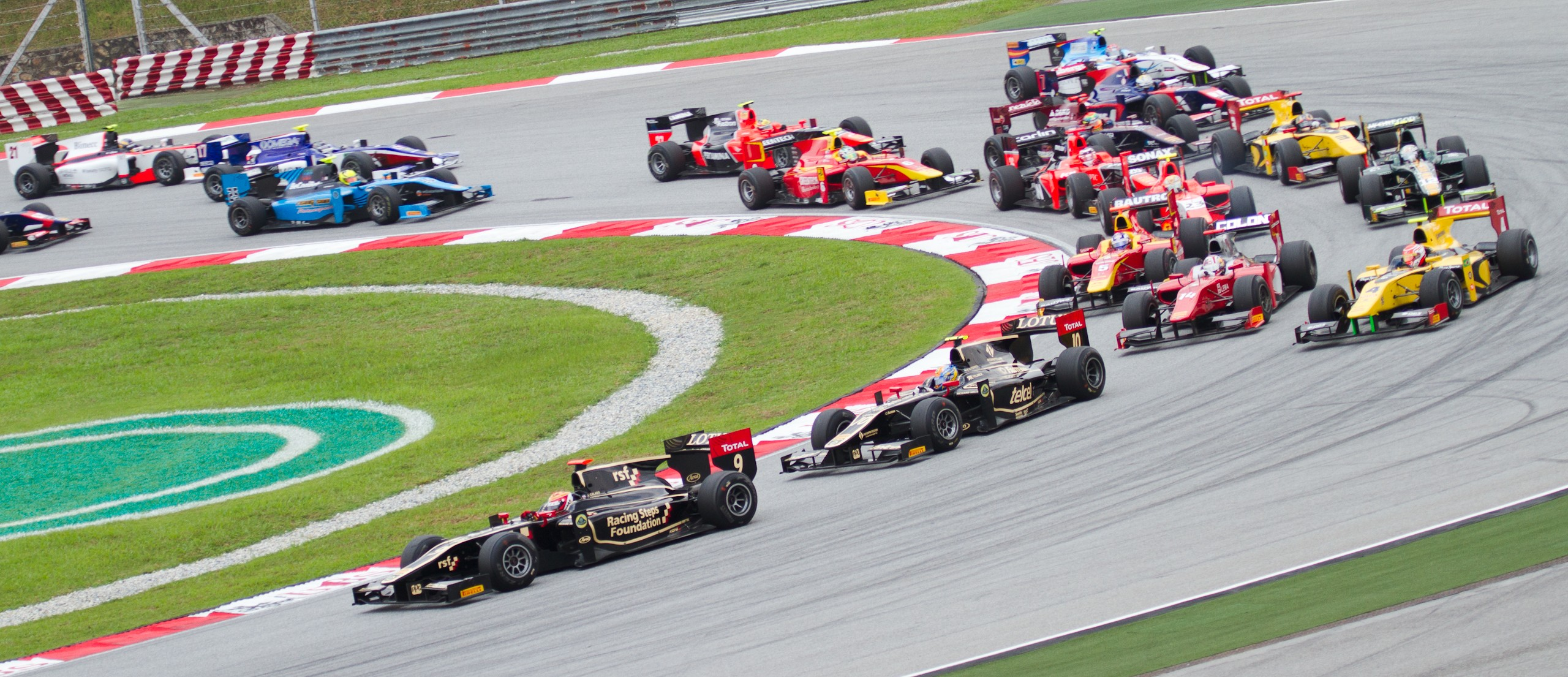
Sprint race start.

The 2012 Sepang GP2 Series round was a GP2 Series motor race held on March 24 and 25, 2012 at Sepang International Circuit, Malaysia. It was the first round of the 2012 GP2 Series season. The race weekend supported the 2012 Malaysian Grand Prix.

Davide Valsecchi was on pole for the feature race, which was won by Luiz Razia. James Calado won the sprint race.

== Classification ==
=== Qualifying ===
Pos	No.	Driver	Team	Time	Grid
1	3	(Italy) Davide Valsecchi	DAMS	1:45.494	1
2	23	(Brazil) Luiz Razia	Arden International	1:45.554	2
3	26	(United Kingdom) Max Chilton	Carlin	1:45.558	3
4	14	(Monaco) Stefano Coletti	Scuderia Coloni	1:45.577	4
5	5	(Switzerland) Fabio Leimer	Racing Engineering	1:45.588	5
6	9	(United Kingdom) James Calado	Lotus GP	1:45.638	6
7	8	(United Kingdom) Jolyon Palmer	iSport International	1:45.758	7
8	12	(Netherlands) Giedo van der Garde	Caterham Racing	1:45.773	8
9	15	(Italy) Fabio Onidi	Scuderia Coloni	1:45.810	12^{1}
10	4	(Brazil) Felipe Nasr	DAMS	1:45.942	9
11	1	(Venezuela) Johnny Cecotto Jr.	Barwa Addax Team	1:46.012	10
12	18	(Italy) Fabrizio Crestani	Venezuela GP Lazarus	1:46.138	11
13	16	(Monaco) Stéphane Richelmi	Trident Racing	1:46.150	13
14	2	(Czech Republic) Josef Král	Barwa Addax Team	1:46.160	14
15	10	(Mexico) Esteban Gutiérrez	Lotus GP	1:46.186	15
16	21	(France) Tom Dillmann	Rapax	1:46.264	16
17	27	(Indonesia) Rio Haryanto	Carlin	1:46.392	17
18	6	(France) Nathanaël Berthon	Racing Engineering	1:46.428	18
19	25	(Netherlands) Nigel Melker	Ocean Racing Technology	1:46.489	19
20	7	(Sweden) Marcus Ericsson	iSport International	1:46.557	20
21	24	(United Kingdom) Jon Lancaster	Ocean Racing Technology	1:46.662	21
22	17	(Colombia) Julián Leal	Trident Racing	1:46.868	22
23	11	(Venezuela) Rodolfo González	Caterham Racing	1:46.962	23
24	22	(Switzerland) Simon Trummer	Arden International	1:47.004	24
25	20	(Portugal) Ricardo Teixeira	Rapax	1:48.113	25
26	19	(Venezuela) Giancarlo Serenelli	Venezuela GP Lazarus	1:49.620	26

Notes

- ^1 – Onidi received a three grid place penalty for impeding González during the qualifying session.

=== Feature Race ===
Pos	No.	Driver	Team	Laps	Time/Retired	Grid	Points
1	23	(Brazil) Luiz Razia	Arden International	30	56:00.250	2	25
2	3	(Italy) Davide Valsecchi	DAMS	30	+7.817	1	24 (18+4+2)
3	26	(United Kingdom) Max Chilton	Carlin	30	+27.366	3	15
4	5	(Switzerland) Fabio Leimer	Racing Engineering	30	+28.291	5	12
5	14	(Monaco) Stefano Coletti	Scuderia Coloni	30	+32.217	4	10
6	4	(Brazil) Felipe Nasr	DAMS	30	+33.378	10	8
7	10	(Mexico) Esteban Gutiérrez	Lotus GP	30	+33.679	15	6
8	9	(United Kingdom) James Calado	Lotus GP	30	+36.449	6	4
9	12	(Netherlands) Giedo van der Garde	Caterham Racing	30	+41.519	8	2
10	18	(Italy) Fabrizio Crestani	Venezuela GP Lazarus	30	+43.240	12	1
11	6	(France) Nathanaël Berthon	Racing Engineering	30	+43.720	18	
12	11	(Indonesia) Rio Haryanto	Carlin	30	+53.383	17	
13	7	(Sweden) Marcus Ericsson	iSport International	30	+1:01.683	20	
14	2	(Czech Republic) Josef Král	Barwa Addax Team	30	+1:02.683	14	
15	17	(Colombia) Julián Leal	Trident Racing	30	+1:09.180	22	
16	25	(Netherlands) Nigel Melker	Ocean Racing Technology	30	+1:10.399	19	
17	8	(United Kingdom) Jolyon Palmer	iSport International	30	+1:12.861	7^{3}	
18	21	(France) Tom Dillmann	Rapax	30	+1:27.810	16^{3}	
19	16	(Monaco) Stéphane Richelmi	Trident Racing	30	+1:35.206^{2}	13	
20	15	(Italy) Fabio Onidi	Scuderia Coloni	30	+1:39.125	12	
21	20	(Portugal) Ricardo Teixeira	Rapax	30	+1:48.025	25	
22	22	(Switzerland) Simon Trummer	Arden International	30	+1:59.672^{2}	24	
23	19	(Venezuela) Giancarlo Serenelli	Venezuela GP Lazarus	29	+1 lap	26	
Ret	11	(Venezuela) Rodolfo González	Caterham Racing	13	Accident	23	
Ret	1	(Venezuela) Johnny Cecotto Jr.	Barwa Addax Team	7	Wheel nut	11	
Ret	24	(United Kingdom) Jon Lancaster	Ocean Racing Technology	1	Accident damage	21	
Fastest lap: Davide Valsecchi (DAMS) — 1:49.246 (lap 24)

Notes:

- ^2 — Stéphane Richelmi and Simon Trummer were both issued with twenty-second time penalties after the race when they were judged to have caused an avoidable collision.
- ^3 — Jolyon Palmer and Tom Dillmann started from the pit lane.

=== Sprint race ===
Pos	No.	Driver	Team	Laps	Time/Retired	Grid	Points
1	9	(United Kingdom) James Calado	Lotus GP	22	41:08.048	1	15
2	10	(Mexico) Esteban Gutiérrez	Lotus GP	22	+2.004	2	12
3	4	(Brazil) Felipe Nasr	DAMS	22	+3.440	3	10
4	12	(Netherlands) Giedo van der Garde	Caterham Racing	22	+10.760	9	8
5	23	(Brazil) Luiz Razia	Arden International	22	+11.430	8	6
6	5	(Switzerland) Fabio Leimer	Racing Engineering	22	+14.689	5	4
7	26	(United Kingdom) Max Chilton	Carlin	22	+15.685	6	2
8	6	(France) Nathanaël Berthon	Racing Engineering	22	+16.578	11	1
9	2	(Czech Republic) Josef Král	Barwa Addax Team	22	+18.175	14	
10	27	(Indonesia) Rio Haryanto	Carlin	22	+24.033	12	2
11	21	(France) Tom Dillmann	Rapax	22	+24.086	18	
12	8	(United Kingdom) Jolyon Palmer	iSport International	22	+25.547	17	
13	15	(Italy) Fabio Onidi	Scuderia Coloni	22	+32.206	20	
14	25	(Netherlands) Nigel Melker	Ocean Racing Technology	22	+34.500	16	
15	17	(Colombia) Julián Leal	Trident Racing	22	+34.629	15	
16	22	(Switzerland) Simon Trummer	Arden International	22	+35.226	23	
17	24	(United Kingdom) Jon Lancaster	Ocean Racing Technology	22	+40.340	26	
18	11	(Venezuela) Rodolfo González	Caterham Racing	22	+44.700	24	
19	16	(Monaco) Stéphane Richelmi	Trident Racing	22	+47.133	19	
20	19	(Venezuela) Giancarlo Serenelli	Venezuela GP Lazarus	22	+1:10.466	22	
21	18	(Italy) Fabrizio Crestani	Venezuela GP Lazarus	22	+1:21.035	10	
22	1	(Venezuela) Johnny Cecotto Jr.	Barwa Addax Team	21	+1 lap	25	
23	14	(Monaco) Stefano Coletti	Scuderia Coloni	20	Damage^{4}	4	
24	20	(Portugal) Ricardo Teixeira	Rapax	19	Accident^{4}	21	
Ret	3	(Italy) Davide Valsecchi	DAMS	13	Collision	7	
Ret	7	(Sweden) Marcus Ericsson	iSport International	13	Collision	13	
Fastest lap: Fabrizio Crestani (Venezuela GP Lazarus) — 1:50.690 (lap 8)

Notes:

- ^4 — Stefano Coletti and Ricardo Teixeira were both classified as having finished the race, as they had completed 90% of the winners race distance.

== Standings after the round ==
Drivers' Championship standings

Pos	Driver	Points
1	(Brazil) Luiz Razia	31
2	(Italy) Davide Valsecchi	24
3	(United Kingdom) James Calado	19
4	(Mexico) Esteban Gutiérrez	18
5	(Brazil) Felipe Nasr	18

Teams' Championship standings

Pos	Team	Points
1	(France) DAMS	42
2	(France) Lotus GP	37
3	(United Kingdom) Arden International	31
4	(United Kingdom) Carlin	19
5	(Spain) Racing Engineering	17

- Note: Only the top five positions are included for both sets of standings.

== Notes ==
Previous round: 2011 GP2 Final (NC)	GP2 Series; 2012 season	Next round: 2012 Bahrain 1st GP2 Series round
Previous round: 2009 Malaysian GP2 Asia Series round	Sepang GP2 round	Next round: 2013 Sepang GP2 Series round
