= Caterham Racing (GP2 team) =

Motor racing team

(Malaysia) Caterham Racing
- Founded: 2010 (as Team AirAsia)
- Folded: 2014
- Team principal(s): Mia Sharizman
- Former series: GP2 Asia Series; GP2 Series
- Noted drivers: (United States) Alexander Rossi (Italy) Davide Valsecchi (Netherlands) Giedo van der Garde

Caterham Racing, formerly EQ8 Caterham Racing and Caterham Team AirAsia was a motor racing team competing in the GP2 Series and GP2 Asia Series. It was created by Tony Fernandes, who was also responsible for the revival of the Lotus name in Formula 1 in 2010 with the creation of the Lotus Racing team. Team AirAsia was officially accepted to the GP2 Series grid on 21 September 2010, along with fellow debutants Carlin Motorsport, filling the gap left by the departures of Durango and DPR. The team made their debut at the first round of the 2010–11 GP2 Asia Series.

In addition to being owned by the Caterham Group that owned Caterham F1 Team, Caterham Racing shared deep technical links with its Formula One parent team. The GP2 operation was embedded within the Formula One operation and base, and the two teams shared the same technical staff. Caterham Racing's (then Team Air Asia) drivers also served as Caterham F1 Team's (then called Team Lotus) test and reserve drivers in the 2011 Formula One season.

The outfit was originally called Team AirAsia. The Caterham designation was added to the official name in June 2011, following Fernandes' purchase of the company. For the 2012 season the team was again renamed as Caterham Racing to coincide with the renaming of the Formula 1 outfit.

In October 2014 GP3 Series team Status Grand Prix acquired the team from Tony Fernandes. The team still operated under the Caterham name for the remainder of the 2014 season and starting from 2015 the team became known as Status Grand Prix.

== Racing history ==
=== 2011 season ===
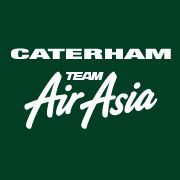
The Caterham Team AirAsia logo as used by the team during the 2011 season.

For its first year in GP2, Caterham signed the experienced duo of Luiz Razia and Davide Valsecchi for both the Asia Series and main series seasons. Both drivers also became test drivers for Tony Fernandes's Formula One team, at this stage known as Team Lotus, and took part in a number of Friday free practice sessions during the F1 season. After finishing seventh in the teams' championship in the truncated Asia Series, Valsecchi began the main series strongly, scoring points six times in the first eight races of the year, including the team's first victory in the feature race at Monaco, which propelled him into contention for the drivers' championship. However, he then failed to score during the remainder of the season, dropping him to eight overall. Razia took over as the team's driving force, securing Caterham's first pole position at the Hungaroring and ending the season twelfth in the standings. The team finished sixth in the teams' championship, well ahead of fellow debutantes Carlin.

Caterham's livery began the season with AirAsia's red-and-white, but switched mid-season to be more in-line with the Team Lotus.

=== 2012 season ===
In January 2012, it was announced that Caterham would be proposed moving to the Leafield Technical Centre (the previous headquarters of the Arrows and Super Aguri F1 teams) in Leafield, Oxfordshire, with its parent F1 team, now renamed as the Caterham F1 Team and Caterham Cars. And in August 2012, Caterham Racing GP2 eventually completed its relocation to Leafield Technical Centre along with Caterham F1 Team and Caterham Cars.

On the driving front, both Razia and Valsecchi moved to other teams and were replaced by Rodolfo González (who tested for the F1 team in 2010) and Giedo van der Garde. In a continuation of the previous season's policy, Van der Garde also became the Caterham F1 team's test and reserve driver. Following the abandonment of the Asia Series, both drivers competed in an expanded main series season: team leader Van der Garde scored a brace of race victories, pole positions and fastest laps, but failed to trouble the championship protagonists and finished the year sixth overall, whilst González picked up six points and finished in 22nd position. Caterham dropped one position in the teams' championship to seventh.

== Results ==
=== GP2 Series ===
Year	Car	Drivers	Races	Wins	Poles	F.L.	Points	D.C.	T.C.
2011	Dallara GP2/11-Mecachrome	(Brazil) Luiz Razia	18	0	1	0	19	12th	6th
2011	Dallara GP2/11-Mecachrome	(Italy) Davide Valsecchi	18	1	0	1	30	8th	6th
2012	Dallara GP2/11-Mecachrome	(Venezuela) Rodolfo González	24	0	0	0	6	22nd	7th
2012	Dallara GP2/11-Mecachrome	(Netherlands) Giedo van der Garde	24	2	2	2	160	6th	7th
2013	Dallara GP2/11-Mecachrome	(Spain) Sergio Canamasas	22	0	0	0	3	25th	9th
2013	Dallara GP2/11-Mecachrome	(China) Ma Qinghua	4	0	0	0	0	35th	9th
2013	Dallara GP2/11-Mecachrome	(United States) Alexander Rossi	18	1	1	0	92	9th	9th
2014	Dallara GP2/11-Mecachrome	(United States) Alexander Rossi	10	0	0	0	11	21st	11th
2014	Dallara GP2/11-Mecachrome	(Indonesia) Rio Haryanto	22	0	0	0	28	15th	11th
2014	Dallara GP2/11-Mecachrome	(France) Tom Dillmann	6	0	0	1	4	19th	11th
2014	Dallara GP2/11-Mecachrome	(France) Pierre Gasly	6	0	0	0	0	26th	11th

=== GP2 Asia Series ===
Year	Car	Drivers	Races	Wins	Poles	F.L.	Points	D.C.	T.C.
2011	Dallara GP2/11-Mecachrome	(Brazil) Luiz Razia	4	0	0	0	0	25th	7th
2011	Dallara GP2/11-Mecachrome	(Italy) Davide Valsecchi	4	0	0	0	9	7th	7th

=== GP2 Series ===
(key) (Races in bold indicate pole position) (Races in italics indicate fastest lap)

Year	Chassis Engine Tyres	Drivers	1	2	3	4	5	6	7	8	9	10	11	12	13	14	15	16	17	18	19	20	21	22	23	24	T.C.	Points
2011	GP2/11; Mecachrome; **P**		IST; FEA	IST; SPR	CAT; FEA	CAT; SPR	MON; FEA	MON; SPR	VAL; FEA	VAL; SPR	SIL; FEA	SIL; SPR	NÜR; FEA	NÜR; SPR	HUN; FEA	HUN; SPR	SPA; FEA	SPA; SPR	MNZ; FEA	MNZ; SPR							6th	49
2011	GP2/11; Mecachrome; **P**	(Brazil) Luiz Razia	6	18	Ret	Ret	Ret	20	6	2	17	14	Ret	14	**3**	7	Ret	Ret	10	9							6th	49
2011	GP2/11; Mecachrome; **P**	(Italy) Davide Valsecchi	16	16	4	4	1	5	3	4	14	17	13	Ret	16	14	10	10	20	Ret							6th	49
2012	GP2/11; Mecachrome; **P**		SEP; FEA	SEP; SPR	BHR1; FEA	BHR1; SPR	BHR2; FEA	BHR2; SPR	CAT; FEA	CAT; SPR	MON; FEA	MON; SPR	VAL; FEA	VAL; SPR	SIL; FEA	SIL; SPR	HOC; FEA	HOC; SPR	HUN; FEA	HUN; SPR	SPA; FEA	SPA; SPR	MNZ; FEA	MNZ; SPR	MRN; FEA	MRN; SPR	7th	166
2012	GP2/11; Mecachrome; **P**	(Venezuela) Rodolfo González	Ret	18	15	20	18	15	15	14	13	5	15	15	23	Ret	23	20	23	16	Ret	14	22	20	Ret	18	7th	166
2012	GP2/11; Mecachrome; **P**	(Netherlands) Giedo van der Garde	9	4	Ret	9	**3**	19	1	6	3	3	11	6	8	21	**5**	2	5	10	5	21	Ret	10	8	1	7th	166
2013	GP2/11; Mecachrome; **P**		SEP; FEA	SEP; SPR	BHR; FEA	BHR; SPR	CAT; FEA	CAT; SPR	MON; FEA	MON; SPR	SIL; FEA	SIL; SPR	NÜR; FEA	NÜR; SPR	HUN; FEA	HUN; SPR	SPA; FEA	SPA; SPR	MNZ; FEA	MNZ; SPR	MRN; FEA	MRN; SPR	YMC; FEA	YMC; SPR			9th	95
2013	GP2/11; Mecachrome; **P**	(Spain) Sergio Canamasas	19	15	20	11	Ret	14	15	11	23	20	12	17	Ret	Ret	Ret	12	9	11	19	Ret	12	8			9th	95
2013	GP2/11; Mecachrome; **P**	(China) Ma Qinghua	21	DNS																							9th	95
2013	GP2/11; Mecachrome; **P**	(United States) Alexander Rossi			3	20	6	6	Ret	19	10	9	11	6	13	16	3	22	8	2	Ret	23	**1**	Ret			9th	95
2014	GP2/11; Mecachrome; **P**		BHR; FEA	BHR; SPR	CAT; FEA	CAT; SPR	MON; FEA	MON; SPR	RBR; FEA	RBR; SPR	SIL; FEA	SIL; SPR	HOC; FEA	HOC; SPR	HUN; FEA	HUN; SPR	SPA; FEA	SPA; SPR	MNZ; FEA	MNZ; SPR	SOC; FEA	SOC; SPR	YMC; FEA	YMC; SPR			11th	42
2014	GP2/11; Mecachrome; **P**	(Indonesia) Rio Haryanto	16	16	5	Ret	7	3	11	17	21	Ret	22†	10	Ret	17	Ret	16	16	15	18	15	9	12			11th	42
2014	GP2/11; Mecachrome; **P**	(United States) Alexander Rossi	22	25	Ret	14	16	11	8	5	12	21															11th	42
2014	GP2/11; Mecachrome; **P**	(France) Tom Dillmann											12	9	9	19†	12	9									11th	42
2014	GP2/11; Mecachrome; **P**	(France) Pierre Gasly																	17	Ret	11	11	21	18			11th	42

=== GP2 Final ===
(key) (Races in bold indicate pole position) (Races in italics indicate fastest lap)

Year	Chassis Engine Tyres	Drivers	1	2	T.C.	Points
2011	GP2/11; Mecachrome; **P**		YMC; FEA	YMC; SPR	4th	9
2011	GP2/11; Mecachrome; **P**	(United States) Alexander Rossi	13	7	4th	9
2011	GP2/11; Mecachrome; **P**	(Brazil) Luiz Razia	2	8	4th	9

=== GP2 Asia Series ===
Year	Chassis Engine Tyres	Drivers	1	2	3	4	T.C.	Points
2011	GP2/11; Mecachrome; **P**		YMC; FEA	YMC; SPR	IMO; FEA	IMO; SPR	7th	9
2011	GP2/11; Mecachrome; **P**	(Brazil) Luiz Razia	Ret	16	Ret	14	7th	9
2011	GP2/11; Mecachrome; **P**	(Italy) Davide Valsecchi	3	4	DSQ	17	7th	9
