= 2011 Monaco GP2 Series round =

Motor racing competition

2011 Monaco GP2 round
Round details
- Round 3 of 9 rounds in the 2011 GP2 Series
- Circuit de Monaco
- Location: Circuit de Monaco; Monte Carlo, Monaco
- Course: Street course 3.340 km (2.080 mi)

GP2 Series

Feature race
- Date: 27 May 2011
- Laps: 41

Pole position
Driver	(United Kingdom) Sam Bird	iSport International
- Time: 1:21.876

Podium
First	(Italy) Davide Valsecchi	Team AirAsia
Second	(Portugal) Álvaro Parente	Racing Engineering
Third	(Italy) Luca Filippi	Super Nova Racing

Fastest lap
Driver	(Italy) Davide Valsecchi	Team AirAsia
- Time: 1:23.011 (on lap 40)

Sprint race
- Date: 28 May 2011
- Laps: 30

Podium
First	(France) Charles Pic	Barwa Addax Team
Second	(Czech Republic) Josef Král	Arden International
Third	(France) Romain Grosjean	DAMS

Fastest lap
Driver	(United Kingdom) Sam Bird	iSport International
- Time: 1:22.713 (on lap 24)

The 2011 Monaco GP2 Round was the third round of the 2011 GP2 Series season. It was held on May 26–28, 2011 at Circuit de Monaco, Monte Carlo, Monaco, supporting the 2011 Monaco Grand Prix. GP2's feeder formula GP3 did not appear at this event.

== Classification ==
=== Qualifying ===
Pos	No.	Driver	Team	Time	Grid
1	4	(Netherlands) Giedo van der Garde	Barwa Addax Team	1:21.781	6^{1}
2	9	(United Kingdom) Sam Bird	iSport International	1:21.876	1
3	5	(France) Jules Bianchi	Lotus ART	1:21.991	8^{2}
4	27	(Italy) Davide Valsecchi	Team AirAsia	1:22.198	2
5	8	(Portugal) Álvaro Parente	Racing Engineering	1:22.371	3
6	21	(Monaco) Stefano Coletti	Trident Racing	1:22.449	4
7	14	(Czech Republic) Josef Král	Arden International	1:22.585	5
8	24	(United Kingdom) Max Chilton	Carlin	1:22.664	7
9	6	(Mexico) Esteban Gutiérrez	Lotus ART	1:22.834	9
10	23	(Venezuela) Johnny Cecotto Jr.	Ocean Racing Technology	1:22.909	10
11	17	(Italy) Luca Filippi	Super Nova Racing	1:22.929	11
12	3	(France) Charles Pic	Barwa Addax Team	1:23.077	12
13	20	(Venezuela) Rodolfo González	Trident Racing	1:23.114	13
14	1	(Switzerland) Fabio Leimer	Rapax	1:23.217	14
15	10	(Sweden) Marcus Ericsson	iSport International	1:23.315	20^{3}
16	25	(United Kingdom) Oliver Turvey	Carlin	1:23.373	15
17	26	(Brazil) Luiz Razia	Team AirAsia	1:23.377	16
18	7	(Spain) Dani Clos	Racing Engineering	1:23.470	17
19	15	(United Kingdom) Jolyon Palmer	Arden International	1:23.496	18
20	2	(Italy) Julián Leal	Rapax	1:23.752	19
21	19	(Italy) Kevin Ceccon	Scuderia Coloni	1:23.913	21
22	16	(Malaysia) Fairuz Fauzy	Super Nova Racing	1:24.103	22
23	22	(Germany) Kevin Mirocha	Ocean Racing Technology	1:24.235	23
24	18	(Romania) Michael Herck	Scuderia Coloni	1:24.466	24
25	12	(Norway) Pål Varhaug	DAMS	1:25.077	25
26	11	(France) Romain Grosjean	DAMS	1:32.079	26^{4}

Notes

1. – Giedo van der Garde was handed a five grid position penalty for causing a collision in the session with Oliver Turvey.
2. – Jules Bianchi was handed a five grid position penalty for causing a collision with van der Garde in Barcelona Sprint Race.
3. – Marcus Ericsson was handed a five grid position penalty for causing a collision with Sam Bird during the qualifying session.
4. – Romain Grosjean was handed a five grid position penalty for causing a collision with Pål Varhaug during the qualifying session. Although he did not set a laptime inside the 107%, Grosjean has been allowed to race as he set a suitable time during the practice session.

=== Feature Race ===
Pos	No.	Driver	Team	Laps	Time/Retired	Grid	Points
1	27	(Italy) Davide Valsecchi	Team AirAsia	41	1:00:23.957	2	10+1
2	8	(Portugal) Álvaro Parente	Racing Engineering	41	+1.471	3	8
3	17	(Italy) Luca Filippi	Super Nova Racing	41	+2.199	11	6
4	11	(France) Romain Grosjean	DAMS	41	+4.219	26	5
5	21	(Monaco) Stefano Coletti	Trident Racing	41	+14.023	4	4
6	14	(Czech Republic) Josef Král	Arden International	41	+14.467	5	3
7	24	(United Kingdom) Max Chilton	Carlin	41	+16.071	7	2
8	3	(France) Charles Pic	Barwa Addax Team	41	+19.524	12	1
9	1	(Switzerland) Fabio Leimer	Rapax	41	+19.934	14	
10	22	(Germany) Kevin Mirocha	Ocean Racing Technology	41	+26.692	23	
11	19	(Italy) Kevin Ceccon	Scuderia Coloni	41	+27.315	21	
12	6	(Mexico) Esteban Gutiérrez	Lotus ART	41	+33.427	9	
13	18	(Romania) Michael Herck	Scuderia Coloni	41	+44.243	24	
14	25	(United Kingdom) Oliver Turvey	Carlin	41	+45.057^{5}	15	
15	16	(Malaysia) Fairuz Fauzy	Super Nova Racing	40	Retired	22	
Ret	2	(Italy) Julián Leal	Rapax	35	Retired	19	
Ret	15	(United Kingdom) Jolyon Palmer	Arden International	33	Retired	18	
Ret	9	(United Kingdom) Sam Bird	iSport International	30	Retired	1	2
Ret	10	(Sweden) Marcus Ericsson	iSport International	30	Retired	20	
Ret	4	(Netherlands) Giedo van der Garde	Barwa Addax Team	22	Retired	6	
Ret	7	(Spain) Dani Clos	Racing Engineering	21	Retired	17	
Ret	20	(Venezuela) Rodolfo González	Trident Racing	19	Retired	13	
Ret	26	(Brazil) Luiz Razia	Team AirAsia	19	Retired	16	
Ret	23	(Venezuela) Johnny Cecotto Jr.	Ocean Racing Technology	17	Retired	10	
Ret	5	(France) Jules Bianchi	Lotus ART	11	Retired	8	
Ret	12	(Norway) Pål Varhaug	DAMS	10	Retired	25	
Fastest lap: Davide Valsecchi (Team AirAsia) 1:23.011 (lap 40)

Notes

1. – Oliver Turvey was handed a 30-second time penalty for failing to take a drive through penalty awarded for a jump start.

=== Sprint Race ===
Pos	No.	Driver	Team	Laps	Time/Retired	Grid	Points
1	3	(France) Charles Pic	Barwa Addax Team	30	45:50.498	1	6
2	14	(Czech Republic) Josef Král	Arden International	30	+3.332	3	5
3	11	(France) Romain Grosjean	DAMS	30	+3.885	5	4+1
4	17	(Italy) Luca Filippi	Super Nova Racing	30	+14.587	6	3
5	27	(Italy) Davide Valsecchi	Team AirAsia	30	+27.072	8	2
6	24	(United Kingdom) Max Chilton	Carlin	30	+29.626	2	1
7	1	(Switzerland) Fabio Leimer	Rapax	30	+29.846	9	
8	25	(United Kingdom) Oliver Turvey	Carlin	30	+30.372	14	
9	4	(Netherlands) Giedo van der Garde	Barwa Addax Team	30	+30.859	19	
10	16	(Malaysia) Fairuz Fauzy	Super Nova Racing	30	+31.585	15	
11	15	(United Kingdom) Jolyon Palmer	Arden International	30	+32.317	17	
12	19	(Italy) Kevin Ceccon	Scuderia Coloni	30	+32.790	11	
13	9	(United Kingdom) Sam Bird	iSport International	30	+33.147	23^{6}	
14	20	(Venezuela) Rodolfo González	Trident Racing	30	+38.695	21	
15	18	(Romania) Michael Herck	Scuderia Coloni	30	+40.518	13	
16	8	(Portugal) Álvaro Parente	Racing Engineering	30	+40.687	7	
17	23	(Venezuela) Johnny Cecotto Jr.	Ocean Racing Technology	30	+41.131	24	
18	7	(Spain) Dani Clos	Racing Engineering	30	+42.611	20	
19	5	(France) Jules Bianchi	Lotus ART	30	+51.544	25	
20	26	(Brazil) Luiz Razia	Team AirAsia	29	+1 lap	22	
21	12	(Norway) Pål Varhaug	DAMS	29	+1 lap	26	
Ret	21	(Monaco) Stefano Coletti	Trident Racing	20	Retired	4	
Ret	10	(Sweden) Marcus Ericsson	iSport International	8	Retired	18	
Ret	2	(Italy) Julián Leal	Rapax	3	Retired	16	
Ret	22	(Germany) Kevin Mirocha	Ocean Racing Technology	2	Retired	10	
DNS	6	(Mexico) Esteban Gutiérrez	Lotus ART	0	Did not start	12	
Fastest lap: Sam Bird (iSport International) 1:22.713 (lap 24)

Notes

1. – Sam Bird was handed a five place grid penalty for causing a collision with Marcus Ericsson during Feature Race.

=== Standings after the round ===
Drivers' Championship standings

Pos	Driver	Points
1	(France) Romain Grosjean	23
2	(United Kingdom) Sam Bird	23
3	(France) Charles Pic	22
4	(Italy) Davide Valsecchi	21
5	(Netherlands) Giedo van der Garde	21

Teams' Championship standings

Pos	Team	Points
1	(Spain) Barwa Addax Team	43
2	(United Kingdom) iSport International	31
3	(Malaysia) Team AirAsia	24
4	(France) DAMS	23
5	(Spain) Racing Engineering	17

- Note: Only the top five positions are included for both sets of standings.

Previous round: 2011 Spanish GP2 round	GP2 Series; 2011 season	Next round: 2011 Valencian GP2 round
Previous round: 2010 Monaco GP2 round	Monaco GP2 round	Next round: 2012 Monaco GP2 Series round
