= Victor Guerin (racing driver) =

Brazilian racing driver

- Nationality: (Brazil) Brazilian
- Born: 17 June 1992 (age 34) São Paulo (Brazil)

Previous series
- 2014 2012 2012 2012 2011 2009–11 2010: NASCAR Whelen Euro Series; GP2 Series; FIA Formula Two Championship; Auto GP World Series; Italian Formula Three; Formula 3 Sudamericana; Formula Abarth

Victor Guerin (born 17 June 1992 in São Paulo) is a Brazilian former professional racing driver.

== Career ==
=== Karting ===
Guerin had some karting experience, by participating in various Brazilian championships.

=== Formula Three Sudamericana ===
Guerin graduated to single-seaters, competing in the Light Class of the local Formula Three Sudamericana championship. He won one race and amassed another four podiums. After ten races in this class, he stepped up to main class, contesting four races, finishing one of them on podium.

=== Formula Abarth ===
In 2010, Guerin switched to Europe, joining the newly launched Formula Abarth series in Italy with JD Motorsport. He won the opening race at Magione and amassed another three point-scoring positions, and finished in thirteenth place in the final championship standings.

=== Italian Formula Three Championship ===
Guerin stepped up to the Italian Formula Three Championship in 2011, and joined Lucidi Motors. He won the final race of the season at the Monza Circuit and collected another four podiums, finishing eighth in the standings.

=== Auto GP World Series ===
In 2012, Guerin graduated to Auto GP World Series, joining Super Nova International. He scored his first podium at the Hungaroring, finishing second behind team-mate Adrian Quaife-Hobbs.

=== FIA Formula Two Championship ===
Aside from his Auto GP commitments, Guerin appeared in the Algarve round of the FIA Formula Two Championship. He finished the weekend's races in eleventh and ninth places respectively.

=== GP2 Series ===
Guerin made his GP2 Series debut at Barcelona, replacing Brendon Hartley at Ocean Racing Technology. He competed in 18 of the series' 24 races, but did not score any points.

=== NASCAR Whelen Euro Series ===
Guerin made his stock car racing debut in 2014 when he competed in the NASCAR Whelen Euro Series. Competing with a Chevrolet SS entered by Brazil Team in the Elite 1 class, Guerin finished the season in 11th place with two podium finishes and a total of four top-ten finishes.

== Racing record ==
=== Career summary ===
Season	Series	Team	Races	Wins	Poles	F/Laps	Podiums	Points	Position
2009	Formula 3 Sudamericana – Light	Dragão Motorsport	10	1	1	1	5	49	4th
2009	Formula 3 Sudamericana	Dragão Motorsport	4	0	0	0	1	15	11th
2010	Formula Abarth	JD Motorsport	12	1	0	1	1	29	13th
2010	Formula 3 Sudamericana	Bassan Motorsport	2	0	0	0	1	30	10th
2011	Formula 3 Brazil Open	Cesário Fórmula	1	0	0	0	1	N/A	**3rd**
2011	Italian Formula Three	Lucidi Motors	14	1	0	0	5	85	8th
2011	Formula3 Sudamericana	Cesário Fórmula	2	1	1	0	2	43	7th
2011	Trofeo Linea Brasil	Pater Racing	2	0	0	0	0	0	NC
2012	Formula 3 Brazil Open	Bassan Motorsport	1	0	0	0	0	N/A	NC
2012	Auto GP World Series	Super Nova International	10	0	0	0	1	46	8th
2012	FIA Formula Two Championship	Motorsport Vision	2	0	0	0	0	2	19th
2012	GP2 Series	Ocean Racing Technology	17	0	0	0	0	0	30th
2014	NASCAR Whelen Euro Series	Brazil Team	12	0	0	0	2	499	11th

=== Complete Auto GP World Series results ===
(key) (Races in bold indicate pole position) (Races in italics indicate fastest lap)

Year	Entrant	1	2	3	4	5	6	7	8	9	10	11	12	13	14	Pos	Points
2012	Super Nova International	MNZ; 1; 15	MNZ; 2; 11	VAL; 1; 16	VAL; 2; 5	MAR; 1 Ret	MAR; 2; 5	HUN; 1; 2	HUN; 2 Ret	ALG; 1; 4	ALG; 2 Ret	CUR; 1	CUR; 2	SON; 1	SON; 2	8th	46

=== Complete GP2 Series results ===
(key) (Races in bold indicate pole position) (Races in italics indicate fastest lap)

Year	Entrant	1	2	3	4	5	6	7	8	9	10	11	12	13	14	15	16	17	18	19	20	21	22	23	24	DC	Points
2012	Ocean Racing Technology	SEP; FEA	SEP; SPR	BHR1; FEA	BHR1; SPR	BHR2; FEA	BHR2; SPR	CAT; FEA; 19	CAT; SPR; 21	MON; FEA; 16	MON; SPR; Ret	VAL; FEA; 17	VAL; SPR; 18	SIL; FEA; 17	SIL; SPR; DNS	HOC; FEA; Ret	HOC; SPR; 23	HUN; FEA; 21	HUN; SPR; 23	SPA; FEA; Ret	SPA; SPR; 18	MNZ; FEA; 23	MNZ; SPR; Ret	MRN; FEA; Ret	MRN; SPR; 13	30th	0

=== NASCAR ===
(key) (Bold – Pole position awarded by qualifying time. Italics – Pole position earned by points standings or practice time. * – Most laps led.)

==== Whelen Euro Series – Elite 1 ====
NASCAR Whelen Euro Series – Elite 1 results
Year	Team	No.	Make	1	2	3	4	5	6	7	8	9	10	11	12	NWES	Pts
2014	Brazil Team	83	Chevy	VAL; 12	VAL; 20	BRH; 12	BRH; 25									11th	499
2014	Brazil Team	82	Chevy					TOU; 18	TOU; 3	NÜR; 24	NÜR; 24	UMB; 19	UMB; 8	BUG; 2	BUG; 6	11th	499
