= 2013 Sepang GP2 Series round =

Motor race

(Malaysia) 2013 Sepang GP2 round
Round details
- Round 1 of 11 rounds in the 2013 GP2 Series
- Layout of the Sepang International Circuit
- Location: Sepang International Circuit, Kuala Lumpur, Selangor, Malaysia
- Course: Permanent racing facility 5.543 km (3.444 mi)

GP2 Series

Feature race
- Date: 23 March 2013
- Laps: 30

Pole position
Driver	(Monaco) Stefano Coletti	Rapax
- Time: 1:44.280

Podium
First	(Switzerland) Fabio Leimer	Racing Engineering
Second	(United Kingdom) James Calado	ART Grand Prix
Third	(Monaco) Stefano Coletti	Rapax

Fastest lap
Driver	(United Kingdom) Sam Bird	Russian Time
- Time: 1:48.777 (on lap 16)

Sprint race
- Date: 24 March 2013
- Laps: 22

Podium
First	(Monaco) Stefano Coletti	Rapax
Second	(Brazil) Felipe Nasr	Carlin
Third	(New Zealand) Mitch Evans	Arden International

Fastest lap
Driver	(Monaco) Stefano Coletti	Rapax
- Time: 1:50.253 (on lap 5)

The 2013 Sepang GP2 Series round was a pair of motor races held on 23 and 24 March 2013 at the Sepang International Circuit in Kuala Lumpur, Selangor, Malaysia as part of the one-make single seater GP2 Series. It was the first round of the 2013 GP2 Series and was run in support of the 2013 Malaysian Grand Prix. The first event, a 30-lap feature race, was won by Racing Engineering driver Fabio Leimer from a fourth position start. James Calado finished second for ART Grand Prix and Rapax's Stefano Coletti took third. Coletti won the 22-lap sprint race held the following day. Carlin's Felipe Nasr took second and Mitch Evans of Arden International was third.

Coletti won the first pole position of his career in the GP2 Series by posing the fastest lap in qualifying and he led the race until he made a pit stop for the hard compound tyres at the conclusion of lap six following pressure by Leimer. Coletti retook the lead after all drivers made their pit stops but he lost the position to Leimer on lap 25 because of tyre degradation. Leimer held the lead for the rest of the race to achieve his first victory in the GP2 Series since the 2011 Catalunya sprint race and the third of his career. Stéphane Richelmi began the sprint race from pole position but he lost the lead to Coletti at the second corner on the first lap. Although Nasr caught him in the closing laps, Coletti kept the lead to take his third GP2 Series career win.

The results of the first round of the season gave Coletti the early lead in the Drivers' Championship with 36 points and Leimer's victory in the feature race put him eleven points behind in second. Nasr was third and Calado fourth. In the Teams' Championship, Rapax took the lead with 42 points, 7 points ahead of Racing Engineering in second. Carlin in third were a further three points behind with ten rounds left in the season.

== Background ==
The 2013 Sepang GP2 Series round was the first of eleven scheduled one-make, single seater motor racing events of the 2013 GP2 Series. It was held on 23 and 24 March 2013 at the 5.543 km (3.444 mi) long Sepang International Circuit in Sepang, Selangor and was run in support of the 2013 Malaysian Grand Prix. It was the second time in GP2 Series history that a race meeting was held in Malaysia after the 2012 round. The track is considered by drivers to be the toughest challenge of the season due to hot and unpredictable weather and the track's abrasive asphalt surface making tyre management necessary. As in the 2012 round, tyre supplier Pirelli brought the yellow-banded soft compound tyres and the orange-banded hard dry compound tyres to Malaysia. There were 26 drivers divided into 13 teams each entered for the round and every entrant utilised the Dallara GP2/11 vehicle.

== Practice and qualifying ==
One practice session lasting half an hour was held on the Thursday before the two races. James Calado set the fastest lap time for ART Grand Prix ten minutes in hot weather conditions at 1:45.403. Simon Trummer was second-fastest for Rapax and Russian Time's Tom Dillmann placed third. 2012 GP3 Series champion Mitch Evans of Arden International was the best-placed rookie in fourth and Marcus Ericsson in the faster of the two DAMS cars was fifth. The rest of the top ten were Felipe Nasr, Johnny Cecotto Jr., Stefano Coletti, Rio Haryanto and Stéphane Richelmi, who had a shoulder injury. While the session passed relatively peacefully, Julián Leal went into a gravel trap at turn four and Kevin Ceccon had to drive onto the run-off area to avoid hitting Sergio Canamasas.

Friday afternoon's qualifying session ran for half an hour. The drivers' fastest lap times determined the starting order for the first race. The pole position winner scored four points in the Drivers' and Teams' Championships Rain during the second practice session for the Malaysian Grand Prix created a wet track but it completely dried up before the GP2 qualifying session began. Sam Bird, in his first GP2 Series qualifying session since the 2011 season, was the early pace setter and held pole position until Nasr went faster. It was taken by Fabio Leimer midway through the session, until Coletti set a time of 1:48.850 and improved it by more than four seconds to a 1:44.280 which was never bettered despite a small error putting him into the grass. Coletti took his first GP2 Series career pole position. He was joined on the grid's front row by Calado who was prevented from taking pole position because of a minor mistake late on his lap. Nasr started from third after locking his tyres entering the turn 15 hairpin and had an oversteer leaving the corner. Leimer did not improve on his second timed lap and was fourth. Bird was provisionally fifth as Evans continued to be the highest-placed rookie in sixth. In positions seven through ten were Haryanto, René Binder, Trummer and Dillmann. Leal was the fastest driver not to enter the top ten. Behind him the rest of the provisional field was Canamasas, Ericsson, Johnny Cecotto Jr., Adrian Quaife-Hobbs, Richelmi, Conor Daly, the Trident duo of Nathanaël Berthon, Ceccon, Ma Qinghua, Daniël de Jong, Daniel Abt, Jolyon Palmer, Jake Rosenzweig, Pål Varhaug and Kevin Giovesi.

=== Post-qualifying ===
After qualifying, Berthon and Canamasas physically remonstrated about on-track etiquette as they waited in the weighbridge area for undisclosed reasons. The stewards deleted Cecotto's lap times because they deemed him to have made an "unacceptable" reaction and Bird was given a three-place grid penalty for impeding Cecotto. With five minutes left of qualifying, Bird delayed Cecotto at turns five and six because he was warming his tyres. He turned off the racing line to allow Cecotto through leaving turn six. Cecotto drew alongside Bird and retaliated for the latter's earlier impediment by swerving to his right into turn seven. putting Bird into the outside grass area.

=== Qualifying classification ===
Pos.	No.	Driver	Team	Time	Grid
1	18	(Monaco) Stefano Coletti	Rapax	1:44.280	1
2	3	(United Kingdom) James Calado	ART Grand Prix	1:44.284	2
3	9	(Brazil) Felipe Nasr	Carlin	1:44.288	3
4	8	(Switzerland) Fabio Leimer	Racing Engineering	1:44.463	4
5	11	(United Kingdom) Sam Bird	Russian Time	1:44.598	8^{1}
6	6	(New Zealand) Mitch Evans	Arden International	1:44.618	5
7	17	(Indonesia) Rio Haryanto	Barwa Addax Team	1:44.681	6
8	24	(Austria) René Binder	Venezuela GP Lazarus	1:44.687	7
9	19	(Switzerland) Simon Trummer	Rapax	1:44.692	9
10	12	(France) Tom Dillmann	Russian Time	1:44.731	10
11	7	(Colombia) Julián Leal	Racing Engineering	1:44.732	11
12	14	(Spain) Sergio Canamasas	Caterham Racing	1:44.761	12
13	1	(Sweden) Marcus Ericsson	DAMS	1:44.766	13
14	5	(Venezuela) Johnny Cecotto Jr.	Arden International	1:44.788	EX^{2}
15	26	(United Kingdom) Adrian Quaife-Hobbs	MP Motorsport	1:45.191	14
16	2	(Monaco) Stéphane Richelmi	DAMS	1:45.262	15
17	22	(United States) Conor Daly	Hilmer Motorsport	1:45.289	16
18	20	(France) Nathanaël Berthon	Trident Racing	1:45.378	17
19	21	(Italy) Kevin Ceccon	Trident Racing	1:45.491	18
20	15	(China) Ma Qinghua	Caterham Racing	1:45.497	19
21	27	(Netherlands) Daniël de Jong	MP Motorsport	1:45.522	20
22	4	(Germany) Daniel Abt	ART Grand Prix	1:45.593	21
23	10	(United Kingdom) Jolyon Palmer	Carlin	1:45.662	22
24	16	(United States) Jake Rosenzweig	Barwa Addax Team	1:45.708	23
25	23	(Norway) Pål Varhaug	Hilmer Motorsport	1:45.830	24
26	19	(Italy) Kevin Giovesi	Venezuela GP Lazarus	1:45.985	25

Notes

- ^1 — Sam Bird was given a three-place grid penalty for impeding Johnny Cecotto Jr. during Cecotto's final flying lap.
- ^2 — Johnny Cecotto Jr. was excluded from qualifying and moved to the back of the grid for forcing Bird off the circuit in retaliation for blocking him, which race stewards described as "an unacceptable reaction".

== Races ==
The first race was held over 170 km (110 mi) or 60 minutes (which ever came first) and all drivers were required by regulations to make one pit stop. The first ten finishers scored points, with two given to the fastest lap holder. The grid for the second race was determined by the finishing order of the first but the first eight drivers were in reverse order of where they finished. It was run for 120 km (75 mi) or 45 minutes (which ever came first). In contrast to the prior race drivers were not required to make pit stops. The top eight finishers earned points towards their respective championships.

=== Feature race ===
The feature race began in hot and humid weather at 11:15 Malaysian Standard Time (UTC+08:00) on 23 March. Leimer made a fast start from fourth place to slalom straight past Calado and Nasr. He drew to the outside of Coletti to contest the lead into the first corner but lost the duel. Evans, ill with food poisoning, took over fourth as an overtake from Calado on Nasr at turn four put both drivers wide. The first retirement came on lap one as the field braked for turn nine and Ericsson misjudged his braking point and ran into the rear of Palmer's car. Ericsson stopped his car in the barrier alongside the circuit. Once a rhythm was established, it became apparent that tyre wear would become a factor as Leimer put race leader Coletti under heavy pressure but he withstood all of his challenges, giving Calado, Nasr and Evans, who were duelling over third, the opportunity to draw closer. On lap three, Quaife-Hobbs mistimed a pass on his teammate de Jong at turn 15 and two retired following a collision with each other. Calado struggled with tyre temperatures but repassed Evans on the same lap.

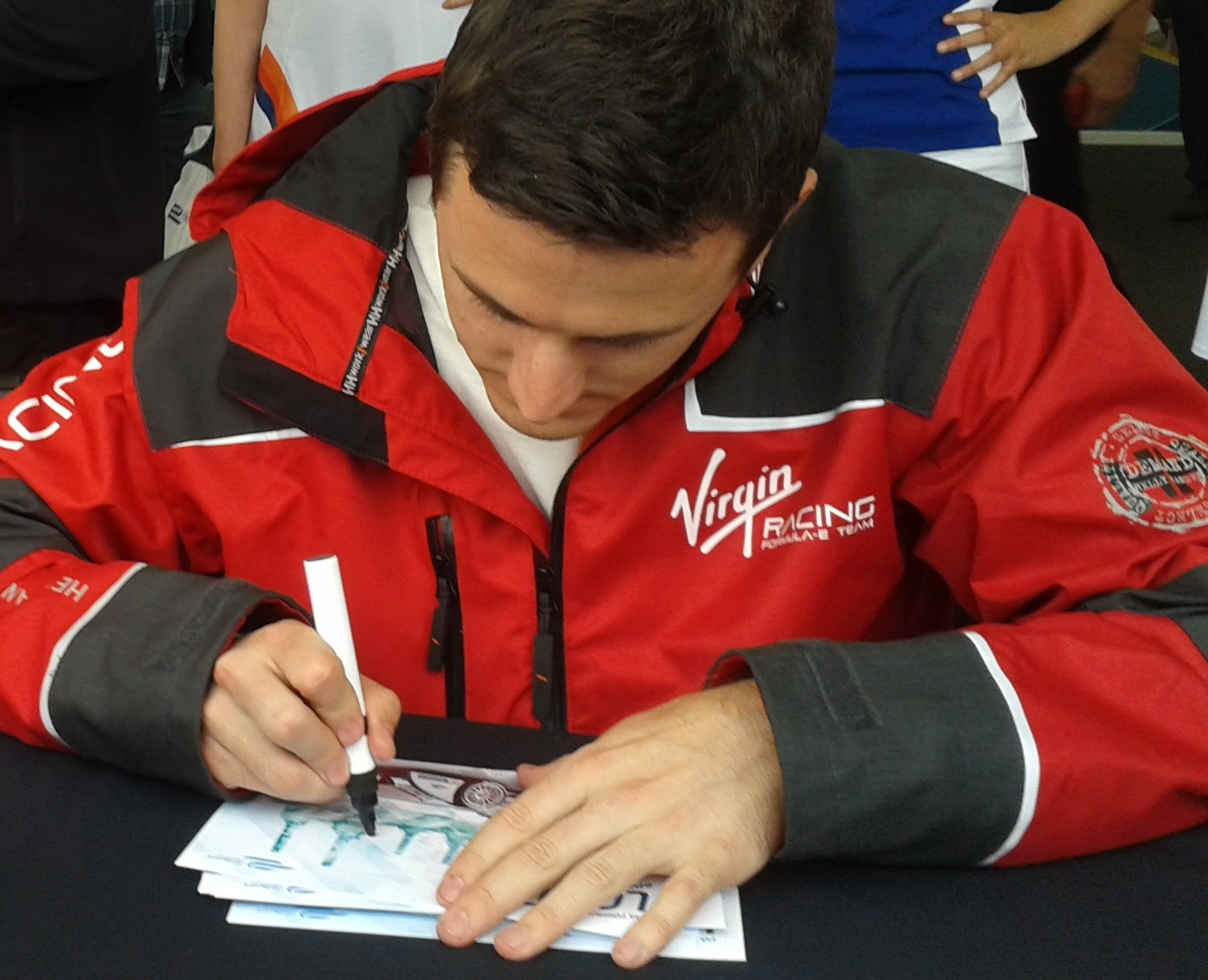
Fabio Leimer (pictured in 2015) took his first victory in the GP2 Series since the 2011 Catalunya sprint race.

Having been known for being hard on his tyres, Coletti struggled as his soft compound tyres degrading and he made a pit stop for the hard compound tyres as soon as drivers were permitted by series officials to do so at the end of lap six, three laps earlier than he aimed for. That allowed Leimer into the lead who immediately began setting a series of consecutive fast laps in clear air in the hope of providing himself with a small lead over Coletti after his pit stop. However Leimer's tactic greatly slowed him compared to Coletti. In the meantime, Abt triggered localised yellow flags on lap ten when he spun off the track and marshals were required to move his car. Leimer emerged close behind Coletti after he made his pit stop on the 11th lap. The yet-to-pit Bird became the new leader when Leimer made his pit stop but his opportunity of claiming a strong result was diminished when he received a drive-through penalty for overtaking under yellow flag conditions. Palmer took the lead on lap 12 and held it until his lap 21 pit stop for the soft compound tyres. On lap 23, Evans and Richelmi ran wide at turn one and Bird overtook them for seventh. Leal overtook Cecotto for fifth on the next lap.

Coletti re-took the lead but began to struggle on the hard compound tyres, allowing Leimer to close up as his tyres degraded and frequently locked his wheels. However, Leimer could not immediately overtake Coletti because he lacked the straightline speed on the straight linking turns 14 and 15. Leimer's awareness of Calado getting closer grew more as the race progressed and he knew he had to pass Coletti as soon as possible. He tried doing this leaving the final corner on lap 25 but was unsuccessful despite exiting faster than Coletti. On the next lap, Coletti put Leimer onto the outside but Leimer overtook him on the racing line at the exit of turn four for the lead. By this point, Calado got close to Coletti and out-braked him at the final corner in attempting to pass but ran deep. Coletti got back through but Calado then tucked into his slipstream and had the grip to overtake him on the inside at the first corner for second place.

Further down the order, Haryanto hit Varhaug while battling for position and Dillmann swerved to avoid getting involved in the duel. Evans locked his tyres, allowing Trummer to pass him for ninth place. At the front, Leimer set a series of lap times under the 1 minute, 50 seconds range in clear air to grow his lead over Calado to two seconds. Leimer crossed the start/finish line at the end of lap 30 to achieve his third victory in the GP2 Series and his first since the 2011 Catalunya sprint race. Calado was second and Coletti completed the podium in third. Off the podium, Nasr took fourth, Leal had the best series result at the time in fifth, Palmer finished sixth and Bird recovered from his penalty to finish seventh, earning Russian Time points on their GP2 Series debut. Richelmi finished eighth and took the pole position for the sprint race. Completing the top ten were Trummer and Evans. The final classified finishers were Binder, Cecotto, Daly, Dillmann, Varhaug, Giovesi, Ceccon, Rosenzweig, Canamasas, Haryanto and Ma. After the race, the stewards deemed Quaife-Hobbs responsible for the collision with his teammate de Jong on lap three and imposed a five-place grid penalty on him for the sprint race.

=== Feature race classification ===
Drivers who scored championship points are denoted in bold.

Pos.	No.	Driver	Team	Laps	Time/Retired	Grid	Points
1	8	(Switzerland) **Fabio Leimer**	**Racing Engineering**	31	57:49.385	4	25
2	3	(United Kingdom) **James Calado**	**ART Grand Prix**	31	+2.045	2	18
3	18	(Monaco) **Stefano Coletti**	**Rapax**	31	+11.271	1	(15+4)
4	9	(Brazil) **Felipe Nasr**	**Carlin**	31	+12.810	3	12
5	7	(Colombia) **Julián Leal**	**Racing Engineering**	31	+28.837	11	10
6	10	(United Kingdom) **Jolyon Palmer**	**Carlin**	31	+34.209	22	8
7	11	(United Kingdom) **Sam Bird**	**Russian Time**	31	+41.183	8	(6+2)
8	2	(Monaco) **Stéphane Richelmi**	**DAMS**	31	+58.941	15	4
9	19	(Switzerland) **Simon Trummer**	**Rapax**	31	+1:02.853	9	2
10	6	(New Zealand) **Mitch Evans**	**Arden International**	31	+1:13.730	5	1
11	24	(Austria) René Binder	Venezuela GP Lazarus	31	+1:16.137	7	
12	5	(Venezuela) Johnny Cecotto Jr.	Arden International	31	+1:18.357	26	
13	22	(United States) Conor Daly	Hilmer Motorsport	31	+1:20.096	16	
14	12	(France) Tom Dillmann	Russian Time	31	+1:21.812	10	
15	23	(Norway) Pål Varhaug	Hilmer Motorsport	31	+1:23.754	24	
16	25	(Italy) Kevin Giovesi	Venezuela GP Lazarus	31	+1:35.775	25	
17	21	(Italy) Kevin Ceccon	Trident Racing	31	+1:37.928	18	
18	16	(United States) Jake Rosenzweig	Barwa Addax Team	31	+1:43.252	23	
19	14	(Spain) Sergio Canamasas	Caterham Racing	31	+2:00.257	12	
20	17	(Indonesia) Rio Haryanto	Barwa Addax Team	30	+1 lap	6	
21	15	(China) Ma Qinghua	Caterham Racing	30	+1 lap	19	
Ret	20	(France) Nathanaël Berthon	Trident Racing	19	Mechanical	17	
Ret	4	(Germany) Daniel Abt	ART Grand Prix	9	Off course	21	
Ret	27	(Netherlands) Daniël de Jong	MP Motorsport	3	Contact	20	
Ret	26	(United Kingdom) Adrian Quaife-Hobbs	MP Motorsport	3	Contact	14	
Ret	1	(Sweden) Marcus Ericsson	DAMS	0	Accident	13	
Fastest lap: Sam Bird (Russian Time) — 1:48.777 (on lap 16)

=== Sprint race ===
The second race began in cloudy weather at 12:15 local time on 24 March. Ma was ruled unfit to compete after the Fédération Internationale de l'Automobile medical doctor diagnosed him with gastroenteritis which led to extreme dehydration. At the start of the formation lap, Palmer stalled his car and was required to start from the pit lane. As a result, Nasr used the vacant spot left by his teammate Palmer to pass the slow-starting Bird and Leal on the inside line going into the first turn. However it was the sixth-placed Coletti who took the lead away from Richelmi because he made a strong getaway and steered onto the outside to pass him leaving the second corner. Going into the braking zone for turn four, Calado got caught out by Leimer and mistimed a pass on him and hit the right-rear corner of his car. The impact dislodged Calado's front wing, which folded under his car's front wheels. This rendered Calado unable to steer and had limited braking capabilities since he could not control his vehicle which launched over the grass on the inside. He struck Leal and Bird at high speed and all three drivers instantly retired in the turn four gravel trap.

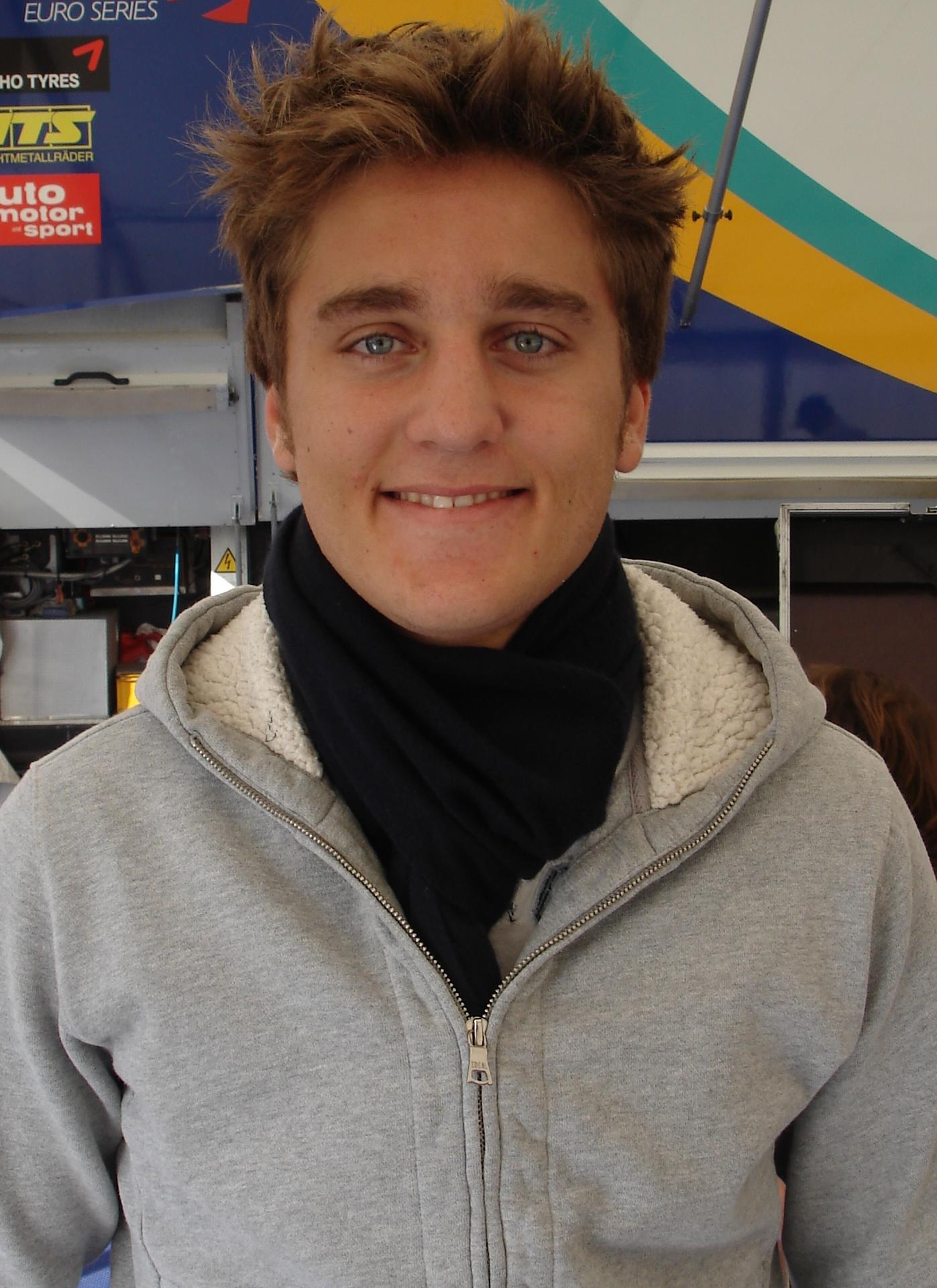
Stefano Coletti (pictured in 2015) led every lap of the sprint race to claim his third victory in the GP2 Series.

Richelmi was overtaken by Nasr at turn one at the start of the second lap and made it stick at the turn two switchback. Coletti, Nasr and Richelmi pulled out a one-second lead over Evans in fourth place with Cecotto in fifth and sixth-placed Leimer who continued to circulate the track despite the first lap contact with Calado. From then on Coletti opened his lead over Nasr to 2.5 seconds over the opening five laps with a series of fastest laps. However, he put himself a risk of putting his tyres under excess stress and creating an identical situation of him losing the chance of victory to a driver who better conserved their tyres. With the lead now stabilised, attention focused on Palmer further down the order as he moved his way through the field and got to 14th midway through the race while Ericsson gained two places to be in 16th. On lap 16, Richelmi out-braked himself and ran deep onto the run-off area at the turn 15 hairpin. Evans had conserved his tyres in the laps beforehand and overtook Richelmi for third. He then repelled a counter-attack from Richelmi into the first corner. On lap 17, Leimer found the damage to his car from the first lap incident with Calado caused too much rear tyre wear and a sudden loss of grip put him into the turn 11 gravel trap and out of the top ten.

Tyre degradation became a factor in the final laps as Nasr lowered Coletti's lead to 1.2 seconds and then to six-tenths of a second by the start of the final lap. It was not enough for Nasr to get close enough to challenge Coletti who managed the gap and his tyres to achieve his third career series victory. Nasr followed eight-tenths of a second later in second and Evans became the youngest driver to claim a podium in the GP2 Series in third. Off the podium, Richelmi finished fourth and Cecotto benefited from the first lap crash to take fifth. Cecotto was ahead of Trummer and Daly who were separated by just four-tenths of a second in sixth and seventh. Daly scored Hilmer's first series points in their debut event. Binder finished sixth-tenths of a second ahead of Palmer for eighth. The final classified finishers were Giovesi, Dillmann, Leimer, Ericsson, de Jong, Canamasas, Abt, Quaife-Hobbs, Haryanto, Varhaug, Rosenzweig, Berthon and Ceccon. After the race, the stewards imposed a ten-place grid penalty on Calado for the next feature race of the season in Bahrain.

=== Sprint race classification ===
Drivers who scored championship points are denoted in bold.

Pos.	No.	Driver	Team	Laps	Time/Retired	Grid	Points
1	18	(Monaco) **Stefano Coletti**	**Rapax**	22	40:49.455	6	(15+2)
2	9	(Brazil) **Felipe Nasr**	**Carlin**	22	+0.832	5	12
3	6	(New Zealand) **Mitch Evans**	**Arden International**	22	+8.358	10	10
4	2	(Monaco) **Stéphane Richelmi**	**DAMS**	22	+11.935	1	8
5	5	(Venezuela) **Johnny Cecotto Jr.**	**Arden International**	22	+15.874	12	6
6	19	(Switzerland) **Simon Trummer**	**Rapax**	22	+17.072	9	4
7	22	(United States) **Conor Daly**	**Hilmer Motorsport**	22	+17.479	13	2
8	24	(Austria) **René Binder**	**Venezuela GP Lazarus**	22	+23.726	11	1
9	10	(United Kingdom) Jolyon Palmer	Carlin	22	+24.326	3	
10	25	(Italy) Kevin Giovesi	Venezuela GP Lazarus	22	+29.020	16	
11	12	(France) Tom Dillmann	Russian Time	22	+30.522	14	
12	8	(Switzerland) Fabio Leimer	Racing Engineering	22	+30.802	8	
13	1	(Sweden) Marcus Ericsson	DAMS	22	+31.342	26	
14	27	(Netherlands) Daniël de Jong	MP Motorsport	22	+32.391	24	
15	14	(Spain) Sergio Canamasas	Caterham Racing	22	+35.336	19	
16	4	(Germany) Daniel Abt	ART Grand Prix	22	+36.339	23	
17	26	(United Kingdom) Adrian Quaife-Hobbs	MP Motorsport	22	+37.033	25^{1}	
18	17	(Indonesia) Rio Haryanto	Barwa Addax Team	22	+43.468	20	
19	23	(Norway) Pål Varhaug	Hilmer Motorsport	22	+46.092	15	
20	16	(United States) Jake Rosenzweig	Barwa Addax Team	22	+51.244	18	
21	20	(France) Nathanaël Berthon	Trident Racing	22	+53.777	22	
22	21	(Italy) Kevin Ceccon	Trident Racing	21	+1 lap	17	
Ret	11	(United Kingdom) Sam Bird	Russian Time	0	Mechanichal	2	
Ret	7	(Colombia) Julián Leal	Racing Engineering	0	Contact	4	
Ret	3	(United Kingdom) James Calado	ART Grand Prix	0	Contact	7	
DNS	15	(China) Ma Qinghua	Caterham Racing	0	Did not start^{2}	DNS	
Fastest lap: Stefano Coletti (Rapax) — 1:50.253 (on lap 5)

Notes:

- **^1** — Adrian Quaife-Hobbs was given a five place grid penalty for the sprint race after colliding with his teammate Daniël de Jong in the feature race.
- **^2** — Ma Qinghua was ruled unfit to take part in the sprint race after being diagnosed with gastroenteritis.

== Post-round ==
The top three drivers in both races appeared on the podium to collect their trophies and in separate press conferences. Leimer commented on his satisfaction over winning his first race for almost two years and said his goal was to win the opening race of the season, "I think it was important for me and the team that we’re already at the front. Everything worked really well today. Mentally, this win is a real boost for me and the team. We’ve worked really hard during the winter and it’s paid off." Calado stated his slow start was caused by cold tyres and him starting on the circuit's dirty side. Nevertheless, he congratulated Leimer on his victory and said he was still happy to finish in second. Third-placed Coletti said he was happy with the result despite problems with his tyres, "I scored good points. The championship is long and we have the time to find a solution to make sure the car is even better during the race. I’m pretty confident." He revealed his tyres began to degrade from the fourth lap which prompted him to make an early pit stop for the hard compound tyres because he feared losing time and Leimer overtaking him.

After the sprint race, Coletti said work put into his car overnight helped him and emphasised the importance about racing in Malaysia's hot weather, "It was really hot out there and very difficult especially when you have to think about the tyres and concentrate on doing everything right because any little mistake can destroy your tyres and the race can be over. So it’s really not easy in the heat!" Nasr said he was happy to finish second and revealed that was his goal for the sprint race before discussing his duel with Coletti, "What I could see from the car was that Stefano built a gap and was safe from there. After that I was mainly trying to save my tyres as best as I could. When it was eight laps to go, I started to push to try and catch up with him, but my rear tyres did not last long enough. I think that’s something we need to work on, but I’m still pleased with second place. I’ve scored good points for the championship." Third-placed Evans said his team adjusted his car to improve its balance for the sprint race and stated he did not try to get second because of the high level of tyre wear, "I was hoping maybe Felipe would have caught Stefano and maybe made contact with him but that did not happen (Laughs). I am satisfied with third in my debut. I think we’re in a good position for the rest of the championship."

Since Sepang was the first round of the season, Coletti became the early leader of the Drivers' Championship with 36 points. Leimer's feature race victory put him eleven points behind in second and Nasr was a further point behind in third. Calado's second place in the feature race put him fourth and Richelmi was fifth. In the Teams' Championship, Rapax assumed the lead with 42 points, seven points ahead of Racing Engineering in second with Carlin another three points behind in third place. ART Grand Prix were fourth with Arden International fifth with ten rounds left in the season.

== Standings after the race ==
Drivers' Championship standings

Pos.	Driver	Points
1	(Monaco) Stefano Coletti	36
2	(Switzerland) Fabio Leimer	25
3	(Brazil) Felipe Nasr	24
4	(United Kingdom) James Calado	18
5	(Monaco) Stéphane Richelmi	12

Teams' Championship standings

Pos.	Team	Points
1	(Italy) Rapax	42
2	(Spain) Racing Engineering	35
3	(United Kingdom) Carlin	32
4	(France) ART Grand Prix	18
5	(United Kingdom) Arden International	17

- Note: Only the top five positions are included for both sets of standings.

Previous round: 2012 Marina Bay GP2 Series round	GP2 Series; 2013 season	Next round: 2013 Bahrain GP2 Series round
Previous round: 2012 Sepang GP2 Series round	Sepang GP2 round	Next round: 2016 Sepang GP2 Series round
