= 2011 Istanbul Park GP2 Series round =

2011 GP2 Series race at Istanbul Park

(Turkey) 2011 Istanbul GP2 round
Round details
- Round 1 of 9 rounds in the 2011 GP2 Series
- Istanbul Park Circuit
- Location: Istanbul Park; Istanbul, Turkey
- Course: Permanent racing facility 5.34 km (3.32 mi)

GP2 Series

Feature race
- Date: 7 May 2011
- Laps: 32

Pole position
Driver	(France) Romain Grosjean	DAMS
- Time: 1:34.398

Podium
First	(France) Romain Grosjean	DAMS
Second	(United Kingdom) Sam Bird	iSport International
Third	(France) Jules Bianchi	ART Grand Prix

Fastest lap
Driver	(United Kingdom) Sam Bird	iSport International
- Time: 1:37.580 (on lap 18)

Sprint race
- Date: 8 May 2011
- Laps: 23

Podium
First	(Monaco) Stefano Coletti	Trident Racing
Second	(Netherlands) Giedo van der Garde	Barwa Addax Team
Third	(United Kingdom) Sam Bird	iSport International

Fastest lap
Driver	(France) Romain Grosjean	DAMS
- Time: 1:38.442 (on lap 6)

The 2011 Turkish GP2 Round was the first round of the 2011 GP2 Series season. It was held on May 6–8, 2011 at Istanbul Speed Park, Istanbul, Turkey, supporting the 2011 Turkish Grand Prix.

This race was the first in the series for the new Dallara GP2/11 chassis and Pirelli as the sole tyre supplier for GP2. The GP2/11 was introduced as a replacement for the Dallara GP2/08 chassis, which was used between 2008 and 2010.

== Classification ==
=== Qualifying ===
Pos	No.	Driver	Team	Time	Grid
1	11	(France) Romain Grosjean	DAMS	1:34.398	1
2	9	(United Kingdom) Sam Bird	iSport International	1:34.483	2
3	17	(Italy) Luca Filippi	Super Nova Racing	1:34.709	3
4	5	(France) Jules Bianchi	Lotus ART	1:34.784	4
5	7	(Spain) Dani Clos	Racing Engineering	1:34.797	5
6	26	(Brazil) Luiz Razia	Team AirAsia	1:34.888	6
7	3	(France) Charles Pic	Barwa Addax Team	1:34.954	7
8	27	(Italy) Davide Valsecchi	Team AirAsia	1:34.975	18^{1}
9	8	(Germany) Christian Vietoris	Racing Engineering	1:34.981	8
10	14	(Czech Republic) Josef Král	Arden International	1:35.050	9
11	24	(United Kingdom) Max Chilton	Carlin	1:35.110	10
12	4	(Netherlands) Giedo van der Garde	Barwa Addax Team	1:35.140	11
13	15	(United Kingdom) Jolyon Palmer	Arden International	1:35.159	12
14	1	(Switzerland) Fabio Leimer	Rapax	1:35.164	13
15	21	(Monaco) Stefano Coletti	Trident Racing	1:35.182	14
16	23	(Venezuela) Johnny Cecotto Jr.	Ocean Racing Technology	1:35.360	15
17	19	(Italy) Davide Rigon	Scuderia Coloni	1:35.369	16
18	10	(Sweden) Marcus Ericsson	iSport International	1:35.375	17
19	16	(Malaysia) Fairuz Fauzy	Super Nova Racing	1:35.428	19
20	18	(Romania) Michael Herck	Scuderia Coloni	1:35.545	20
21	12	(Norway) Pål Varhaug	DAMS	1:35.681	21
22	22	(Germany) Kevin Mirocha	Ocean Racing Technology	1:35.825	22
23	25	(Russia) Mikhail Aleshin	Carlin	1:35.873	^{2}
24	6	(Mexico) Esteban Gutiérrez	Lotus ART	1:35.973	23
25	2	(Colombia) Julián Leal	Rapax	1:36.168	24
26	20	(Venezuela) Rodolfo González	Trident Racing	1:36.187	25

Notes

1. – Davide Valsecchi was handed a ten place grid penalty for driving in the opposite direction during the qualifying session.
2. – Mikhail Aleshin did not contest the remainder of the weekend, having fractured a metacarpal in his left hand during an accident in qualifying.

=== Feature Race ===
Pos	No.	Driver	Team	Laps	Time/Retired	Grid	Points
1	11	(France) Romain Grosjean	DAMS	32	57:09.999	1	12 (10+2)
2	9	(United Kingdom) Sam Bird	iSport International	32	+0.332	2	9 (8+1)
3	5	(France) Jules Bianchi	Lotus ART	32	+35.856	4	6
4	4	(Netherlands) Giedo van der Garde	Barwa Addax Team	32	+45.933	11	5
5	21	(Monaco) Stefano Coletti	Trident Racing	32	+52.280	14	4
6	26	(Brazil) Luiz Razia	Team AirAsia	32	+52.866	6	3
7	3	(France) Charles Pic	Barwa Addax Team	32	+1:03.117	7	2
8	7	(Spain) Dani Clos	Racing Engineering	32	+1:11.822	5	1
9	10	(Sweden) Marcus Ericsson	iSport International	32	+1:12.913	17	
10	19	(Italy) Davide Rigon	Scuderia Coloni	32	+1:15.636	16	
11	8	(Germany) Christian Vietoris	Racing Engineering	32	+1:20.559	8	
12	16	(Malaysia) Fairuz Fauzy	Super Nova Racing	32	+1:26.007	19	
13	14	(Czech Republic) Josef Král	Arden International	32	+1:31.885	9	
14	18	(Romania) Michael Herck	Scuderia Coloni	32	+1:43.492	20	
15	22	(Germany) Kevin Mirocha	Ocean Racing Technology	31	Retired	22	
16	27	(Italy) Davide Valsecchi	Team AirAsia	31	+1 lap	18	
17	15	(United Kingdom) Jolyon Palmer	Arden International	31	+1 lap	12	
18	12	(Norway) Pål Varhaug	DAMS	31	+1 lap	21	
19	2	(Colombia) Julián Leal	Rapax	31	+1 lap	24	
Ret	20	(Venezuela) Rodolfo González	Trident Racing	16	Gearbox	25	
Ret	17	(Italy) Luca Filippi	Super Nova Racing	15	Accident damage	3	
Ret	23	(Venezuela) Johnny Cecotto Jr.	Ocean Racing Technology	14	Accident	15	
Ret	24	(United Kingdom) Max Chilton	Carlin	0	Accident	10	
Ret	1	(Switzerland) Fabio Leimer	Rapax	0	Accident	13	
Ret	6	(Mexico) Esteban Gutiérrez	Lotus ART	0	Accident	23	
DNS	25	(Russia) Mikhail Aleshin	Carlin		Injured		
Fastest lap: Sam Bird (iSport International) 1:37.580 (lap 18)

=== Sprint Race ===
Pos	No.	Driver	Team	Laps	Time/Retired	Grid	Points
1	21	(Monaco) Stefano Coletti	Trident Racing	23	41:40.571	4	6
2	4	(Netherlands) Giedo van der Garde	Barwa Addax Team	23	+2.184	5	5
3	9	(United Kingdom) Sam Bird	iSport International	23	+2.756	7	4
4	3	(France) Charles Pic	Barwa Addax Team	23	+3.243	2	3
5	16	(Malaysia) Fairuz Fauzy	Super Nova Racing	23	+3.502	12	2
6	14	(Czech Republic) Josef Král	Arden International	23	+5.038	13	1
7	5	(France) Jules Bianchi	Lotus ART	23	+5.373	6	
8	10	(Sweden) Marcus Ericsson	iSport International	23	+5.602	9	
9	15	(United Kingdom) Jolyon Palmer	Arden International	23	+7.143	17	
10	11	(France) Romain Grosjean	DAMS	23	+7.501	8	1
11	6	(Mexico) Esteban Gutiérrez	Lotus ART	23	+7.892	25	
12	18	(Romania) Michael Herck	Scuderia Coloni	23	+9.261	14	
13	23	(Venezuela) Johnny Cecotto Jr.	Ocean Racing Technology	23	+10.697	22	
14	17	(Italy) Luca Filippi	Super Nova Racing	23	+11.862	21	
15	7	(Spain) Dani Clos	Racing Engineering	23	+12.140	1	
16	27	(Italy) Davide Valsecchi	Team AirAsia	23	+12.237	16	
17	24	(United Kingdom) Max Chilton	Carlin	23	+12.359	23	
18	26	(Brazil) Luiz Razia	Team AirAsia	23	+12.826	3	
19	22	(Germany) Kevin Mirocha	Ocean Racing Technology	23	+12.950	15	
20	1	(Switzerland) Fabio Leimer	Rapax	23	+13.708	24	
21	12	(Norway) Pål Varhaug	DAMS	23	+14.195	18	
22	20	(Venezuela) Rodolfo González	Trident Racing	23	+15.582	20	
Ret	19	(Italy) Davide Rigon	Scuderia Coloni	18	Collision	10	
Ret	2	(Italy) Julián Leal	Rapax	18	Collision	19	
Ret	8	(Germany) Christian Vietoris	Racing Engineering	3	Spun off	11	
DNS	25	(Russia) Mikhail Aleshin	Carlin		Injured		
Fastest lap: Romain Grosjean (DAMS) 1:38.442 (lap 6)

== Standings after the round ==
Drivers' Championship standings

Pos	Driver	Points
1	(France) Romain Grosjean	13
2	(United Kingdom) Sam Bird	13
3	(Monaco) Stefano Coletti	10
4	(Netherlands) Giedo van der Garde	10
5	(France) Jules Bianchi	6

Teams' Championship standings

Pos	Team	Points
1	(Spain) Barwa Addax Team	15
2	(France) DAMS	13
3	(United Kingdom) iSport International	13
4	(Italy) Trident Racing	10
5	(France) Lotus ART	6

- Note: Only the top five positions are included for both sets of standings.

== See also ==
- 2011 Turkish Grand Prix
- 2011 Istanbul Park GP3 Series round

Previous round: 2010 Abu Dhabi GP2 round	GP2 Series; 2011 season	Next round: 2011 Spanish GP2 round
Previous round: 2010 Turkish GP2 round	Turkish GP2 round	Next round: none
