= 2011 Spa-Francorchamps GP2 Series round =

Motor race in Belgium

(Belgium) 2011 Belgian GP2 round
Round details
- Round 8 of 9 rounds in the 2011 GP2 Series
- Location: Circuit de Spa-Francorchamps, Belgium
- Course: Permanent racing facility 7.004 km (4.352 mi)

GP2 Series

Feature race
- Date: 27 August 2011
- Laps: 24 (25 scheduled)

Pole position
Driver	(Germany) Christian Vietoris	Racing Engineering
- Time: 2:18.345

Podium
First	(Germany) Christian Vietoris	Racing Engineering
Second	(France) Jules Bianchi	Lotus ART
Third	(France) Romain Grosjean	DAMS

Fastest lap
Driver	(Colombia) Julián Leal	Rapax
- Time: 2:00.526 (on lap 12)

Sprint race
- Date: 28 August 2011
- Laps: 18

Podium
First	(Italy) Luca Filippi	Scuderia Coloni
Second	(France) Jules Bianchi	Lotus ART
Third	(Czech Republic) Josef Král	Arden International

Fastest lap
Driver	(Sweden) Marcus Ericsson	iSport International
- Time: 2:00.493 (on lap 15)

The 2011 Belgian GP2 round was a GP2 Series motor race held on August 27 and 28, 2011 at Circuit de Spa-Francorchamps, Belgium. It was the eighth round of the 2011 GP2 season. The race supported the 2011 Belgian Grand Prix.

Romain Grosjean secured the 2011 GP2 Series championship with a third place in the feature race when title rival Giedo van der Garde crashed out.

== Classification ==
=== Qualifying ===
Pos	No.	Driver	Team	Time	Grid
1	8	(Germany) Christian Vietoris	Racing Engineering	2:18.345	1
2	19	(Italy) Luca Filippi	Scuderia Coloni	2:19.779	2
	3	(France) Charles Pic	Barwa Addax Team	2:20.056	26^{1}
3	5	(France) Jules Bianchi	Lotus ART	2:20.211	3
4	18	(Romania) Michael Herck	Scuderia Coloni	2:20.748	4
5	10	(Sweden) Marcus Ericsson	iSport International	2:20.858	5
6	17	(United Kingdom) Adam Carroll	Super Nova Racing	2:21.491	6
7	11	(France) Romain Grosjean	DAMS	2:21.715	7
8	23	(Venezuela) Johnny Cecotto Jr.	Ocean Racing Technology	2:21.753	8
9	6	(Mexico) Esteban Gutiérrez	Lotus ART	2:21.877	9
10	4	(Netherlands) Giedo van der Garde	Barwa Addax Team	2:21.956	10
11	22	(New Zealand) Brendon Hartley	Ocean Racing Technology	2:22.145	11
12	7	(Spain) Dani Clos	Racing Engineering	2:22.254	12
13	16	(Malaysia) Fairuz Fauzy	Super Nova Racing	2:22.299	13
14	25	(Russia) Mikhail Aleshin	Carlin	2:22.326	14
15	14	(Czech Republic) Josef Král	Arden International	2:22.346	15
16	24	(United Kingdom) Max Chilton	Carlin	2:22.573	16
17	1	(Switzerland) Fabio Leimer	Rapax	2:22.623	17
18	20	(Venezuela) Rodolfo González	Trident Racing	2:22.655	18
19	26	(Brazil) Luiz Razia	Caterham Team AirAsia	2:22.895	19
20	27	(Italy) Davide Valsecchi	Caterham Team AirAsia	2:23.364	25^{2}
21	9	(United Kingdom) Sam Bird	iSport International	2:23.365	20
22	15	(United Kingdom) Jolyon Palmer	Arden International	2:23.495	21
23	12	(Norway) Pål Varhaug	DAMS	2:23.830	22
24	21	(Monaco) Stefano Coletti	Trident Racing	2:24.272	23
25	2	(Colombia) Julián Leal	Rapax	2:24.832	24

Notes

- ^1 – Pic was excluded from the results of the qualifying session because his car did not comply with the technical regulations, having insufficient fuel available for the scrutineering.
- ^2 – Valsecchi was given a ten place grid penalty for Feature Race after setting his fastest sector time under yellow flags during the qualifying session.

=== Feature Race ===
Pos	No.	Driver	Team	Laps	Time/Retired	Grid	Points
1	8	(Germany) Christian Vietoris	Racing Engineering	24	1:00:55.099	1	10+2+1
2	5	(France) Jules Bianchi	Lotus ART	24	+2.862	3	8
3	11	(France) Romain Grosjean	DAMS	24	+4.571	7	6
4	19	(Italy) Luca Filippi	Scuderia Coloni	24	+6.441	2	5
5	22	(New Zealand) Brendon Hartley	Ocean Racing Technology	24	+11.614	11	4
6	7	(Spain) Dani Clos	Racing Engineering	24	+12.471	12	3
7^{3}	16	(Malaysia) Fairuz Fauzy	Super Nova Racing	24	+18.906	13	2
8^{3}	14	(Czech Republic) Josef Král	Arden International	24	+17.391	15	1
9	17	(United Kingdom) Adam Carroll	Super Nova Racing	24	+19.364	6	
10	27	(Italy) Davide Valsecchi	Caterham Team AirAsia	24	+20.228	25	
11	23	(Venezuela) Johnny Cecotto Jr.	Ocean Racing Technology	24	+22.899	8	
12	9	(United Kingdom) Sam Bird	iSport International	24	+23.358	20	
13	12	(Norway) Pål Varhaug	DAMS	24	+24.110	22	
14	6	(Mexico) Esteban Gutiérrez	Lotus ART	24	+31.304	10	
15	24	(United Kingdom) Max Chilton	Carlin	23	+1 lap	16	
16	18	(Romania) Michael Herck	Scuderia Coloni	23	+1 lap	4	
Ret	10	(Sweden) Marcus Ericsson	iSport International	18	Gearbox	5	
Ret	4	(Netherlands) Giedo van der Garde	Barwa Addax Team	18	Collision	10	
Ret	20	(Venezuela) Rodolfo González	Trident Racing	18	Collision damage	18	
Ret	25	(Russia) Mikhail Aleshin	Carlin	16	Collision damage	14	
Ret	15	(United Kingdom) Jolyon Palmer	Arden International	16	Engine	21	
Ret	21	(Monaco) Stefano Coletti	Trident Racing	15	Collision	23	
Ret	2	(Colombia) Julián Leal	Rapax	14	Spun off	24	
Ret	1	(Switzerland) Fabio Leimer	Rapax	7	Gearbox	17	
Ret	26	(Brazil) Luiz Razia	Caterham Team AirAsia	1	Collision	19	
Ret	3	(France) Charles Pic	Barwa Addax Team	1	Collision	26	
Fastest lap: Julián Leal (Rapax) 2:00.536 (lap 12)

Notes

- ^3 – Fauzy and Král had their finishing positions swapped after post-race investigations: Fauzy passed the Czech driver behind the safety car but was ordered to let Král through. Then the stewards determined that the Malaysian was within his rights to pass Král, because the Czech had slowed too much, so they switched their positions.

=== Sprint Race ===
Pos	No.	Driver	Team	Laps	Time/Retired	Grid	Points
1	19	(Italy) Luca Filippi	Scuderia Coloni	18	39:34.834	5	6+1
2	5	(France) Jules Bianchi	Lotus ART	18	+4.476	7	5
3	14	(Czech Republic) Josef Král	Arden International	18	+6.857	1	4
4	11	(France) Romain Grosjean	DAMS	18	+7.685	6	3
5	9	(United Kingdom) Sam Bird	iSport International	18	+8.993	12	2
6	7	(Spain) Dani Clos	Racing Engineering	18	+12.952	3	1
7	6	(Mexico) Esteban Gutiérrez	Lotus ART	18	+14.364	14	
8	23	(Venezuela) Johnny Cecotto Jr.	Ocean Racing Technology	18	+19.360	11	
9	22	(New Zealand) Brendon Hartley	Ocean Racing Technology	18	+19.634	3	
10	27	(Italy) Davide Valsecchi	Caterham Team AirAsia	18	+20.192	10	
11	17	(United Kingdom) Adam Carroll	Super Nova Racing	18	+21.472	9	
12	10	(Sweden) Marcus Ericsson	iSport International	18	+22.033	17	
13	8	(Germany) Christian Vietoris	Racing Engineering	18	+22.348	8	
14	15	(United Kingdom) Jolyon Palmer	Arden International	18	+22.917	20	
15	18	(Romania) Michael Herck	Scuderia Coloni	18	+23.672	16	
16	24	(United Kingdom) Max Chilton	Carlin	18	+27.960	15	
17	20	(Venezuela) Rodolfo González	Trident Racing	18	+28.510	25	
18	12	(Norway) Pål Varhaug	DAMS	18	+28.547	13	
19	3	(France) Charles Pic	Barwa Addax Team	18	+28.853	24	
20	4	(Netherlands) Giedo van der Garde	Barwa Addax Team	18	+29.374	18	
21	16	(Malaysia) Fairuz Fauzy	Super Nova Racing	18	+59.072	2	
Ret	25	(Russia) Mikhail Aleshin	Carlin	13	Gearbox	19	
Ret	2	(Colombia) Julián Leal	Rapax	13	Spun off	21	
Ret	26	(Brazil) Luiz Razia	Caterham Team AirAsia	12	Collision	23	
Ret	1	(Switzerland) Fabio Leimer	Rapax	7	Accident	22	
DNS	21	(Monaco) Stefano Coletti	Trident Racing		Injury		
Fastest lap: Marcus Ericsson (iSport International) 2:00.493 (lap 15)

== Standings after the round ==
Drivers' Championship standings

Pos	Driver	Points
1	(France) Romain Grosjean	83
2	(Netherlands) Giedo van der Garde	49
3	(France) Jules Bianchi	48
4	(France) Charles Pic	42
5	(Italy) Luca Filippi	40

Teams' Championship standings

Pos	Team	Points
1	(Spain) Barwa Addax Team	91
2	(France) DAMS	83
3	(Spain) Racing Engineering	64
4	(France) Lotus ART	62
5	(United Kingdom) iSport International	62

- Note: Only the top five positions are included for both sets of standings.

== See also ==
- 2011 Belgian Grand Prix
- 2011 Spa-Francorchamps GP3 Series round

Previous round: 2011 Hungarian GP2 round	GP2 Series; 2011 season	Next round: 2011 Italian GP2 round
Previous round: 2010 Belgian GP2 round	Belgian GP2 round	Next round: 2012 Spa-Francorchamps GP2 Series round
