= 2011 Catalunya GP2 Series round =

Round in Formula One racing

(Spain) 2011 Spanish GP2 round
Round details
- Round 2 of 9 rounds in the 2011 GP2 Series
- Circuit de Catalunya
- Location: Circuit de Catalunya; Montmeló, Spain
- Course: Permanent racing facility 4.665 km (2.892 mi)

GP2 Series

Feature race
- Date: 21 May 2011
- Laps: 34

Pole position
Driver	(Netherlands) Giedo van der Garde	Barwa Addax Team
- Time: 1:30.473

Podium
First	(France) Charles Pic	Barwa Addax Team
Second	(Netherlands) Giedo van der Garde	Barwa Addax Team
Third	(United Kingdom) Sam Bird	iSport International

Fastest lap
Driver	(Netherlands) Giedo van der Garde	Barwa Addax Team
- Time: 1:33.959 (on lap 6)

Sprint race
- Date: 22 May 2011
- Laps: 26

Podium
First	(Switzerland) Fabio Leimer	Rapax
Second	(Spain) Dani Clos	Racing Engineering
Third	(Sweden) Marcus Ericsson	iSport International

Fastest lap
Driver	(France) Charles Pic	Barwa Addax Team
- Time: 1:33.725 (on lap 21)

The 2011 Spanish GP2 Round was the second round of the 2011 GP2 Series season. It was held on May 20–22, 2011 at Circuit de Catalunya, Montmeló, Spain, supporting the 2011 Spanish Grand Prix.

== Classification ==
=== Qualifying ===
Pos	No.	Driver	Team	Time	Grid
1	5	(France) Jules Bianchi	Lotus ART	1:30.369	11^{1}
2	4	(Netherlands) Giedo van der Garde	Barwa Addax Team	1:30.473	1
3	9	(United Kingdom) Sam Bird	iSport International	1:30.488	2
4	3	(France) Charles Pic	Barwa Addax Team	1:30.616	3
5	11	(France) Romain Grosjean	DAMS	1:30.807	4
6	27	(Italy) Davide Valsecchi	Team AirAsia	1:30.820	5
7	7	(Spain) Dani Clos	Racing Engineering	1:30.927	6
8	10	(Sweden) Marcus Ericsson	iSport International	1:30.935	7
9	21	(Monaco) Stefano Coletti	Trident Racing	1:30.974	8
10	17	(Italy) Luca Filippi	Super Nova Racing	1:31.084	9
11	24	(United Kingdom) Max Chilton	Carlin	1:31.192	10
12	14	(Czech Republic) Josef Král	Arden International	1:31.447	12
13	26	(Brazil) Luiz Razia	Team AirAsia	1:31.513	13
14	18	(Romania) Michael Herck	Scuderia Coloni	1:31.527	14
15	8	(Portugal) Álvaro Parente	Racing Engineering	1:31.636	15
16	6	(Mexico) Esteban Gutiérrez	Lotus ART	1:31.645	16
17	19	(Italy) Kevin Ceccon	Scuderia Coloni	1:31.670	17
18	20	(Venezuela) Rodolfo González	Trident Racing	1:31.694	18
19	22	(Germany) Kevin Mirocha	Ocean Racing Technology	1:31.757	19
20	12	(Norway) Pål Varhaug	DAMS	1:31.779	20
21	16	(Malaysia) Fairuz Fauzy	Super Nova Racing	1:31.821	21
22	15	(United Kingdom) Jolyon Palmer	Arden International	1:31.822	22
23	25	(Russia) Mikhail Aleshin	Carlin	1:31.977	23
24	2	(Italy) Julián Leal	Rapax	1:32.934	25^{2}
25	23	(Venezuela) Johnny Cecotto Jr.	Ocean Racing Technology	1:33.246	24
26	1	(Switzerland) Fabio Leimer	Rapax	no time	26

Notes

1. – Jules Bianchi was handed a ten grid position penalty for ignoring yellow flags during the session.
2. – Julián Leal was handed a ten grid position penalty for causing a collision in Turkish Sprint Race.

=== Feature Race ===
Pos	No.	Driver	Team	Laps	Time/Retired	Grid	Points
1	3	(France) Charles Pic	Barwa Addax Team	34	1:00:32.817	3	10
2	4	(Netherlands) Giedo van der Garde	Barwa Addax Team	34	+1.444	1	8+2+1
3	9	(United Kingdom) Sam Bird	iSport International	34	+2.773	2	6
4	27	(Italy) Davide Valsecchi	Team AirAsia	34	+10.011	5	5
5	10	(Sweden) Marcus Ericsson	iSport International	34	+10.518	7	4
6	7	(Spain) Dani Clos	Racing Engineering	34	+16.534	6	3
7	5	(France) Jules Bianchi	Lotus ART	34	+16.979	11	2
8	1	(Switzerland) Fabio Leimer	Rapax	34	+17.419	26	1
9	14	(Czech Republic) Josef Král	Arden International	34	+21.726	12	
10	21	(Monaco) Stefano Coletti	Trident Racing	34	+24.492	8	
11	8	(Portugal) Álvaro Parente	Racing Engineering	34	+24.715	15	
12	24	(United Kingdom) Max Chilton	Carlin	34	+25.349	10	
13	16	(Malaysia) Fairuz Fauzy	Super Nova Racing	34	+25.841	21	
14	23	(Venezuela) Johnny Cecotto Jr.	Ocean Racing Technology	34	+28.469	24	
15	12	(Norway) Pål Varhaug	DAMS	34	+35.890	20	
16	25	(Russia) Mikhail Aleshin	Carlin	34	+37.837	23	
17	2	(Italy) Julián Leal	Rapax	34	+38.135	25	
18	15	(United Kingdom) Jolyon Palmer	Arden International	34	+38.723	22	
19	19	(Italy) Kevin Ceccon	Scuderia Coloni	34	+39.033	17	
20	20	(Venezuela) Rodolfo González	Trident Racing	34	+41.999	18	
21	22	(Germany) Kevin Mirocha	Ocean Racing Technology	33	Retirement	19	
Ret	18	(Romania) Michael Herck	Scuderia Coloni	21	Collision	14	
Ret	6	(Mexico) Esteban Gutiérrez	Lotus ART	21	Collision	16	
Ret	26	(Brazil) Luiz Razia	Team AirAsia	11	Retirement	13	
Ret	17	(Italy) Luca Filippi	Super Nova Racing	0	Collision	9	
DSQ	11	(France) Romain Grosjean	DAMS	34	Disqualified^{3}	4	
Fastest lap: Giedo van der Garde (Barwa Addax Team) 1:33.959 (lap 6)

Notes

1. – Romain Grosjean was excluded from race results after it was found that the driver's car did not comply with the technical regulations.

=== Sprint Race ===
Pos	No.	Driver	Team	Laps	Time/Retired	Grid	Points
1	1	(Switzerland) Fabio Leimer	Rapax	26	45:26.885	1	6+1
2	7	(Spain) Dani Clos	Racing Engineering	26	+10.190	3	5
3	10	(Sweden) Marcus Ericsson	iSport International	26	+20.711	4	4
4	27	(Italy) Davide Valsecchi	Team AirAsia	26	+20.926	5	3
5	9	(United Kingdom) Sam Bird	iSport International	26	+27.339	6	2
6	16	(Malaysia) Fairuz Fauzy	Super Nova Racing	26	+38.974	13	1
7	8	(Portugal) Álvaro Parente	Racing Engineering	26	+40.280	11	
8	12	(Norway) Pål Varhaug	DAMS	26	+41.855	15	
9	11	(France) Romain Grosjean	DAMS	26	+41.925	26	
10	20	(Venezuela) Rodolfo González	Trident Racing	26	+51.503	20	
11	24	(United Kingdom) Max Chilton	Carlin	26	+52.553	12	
12	6	(Mexico) Esteban Gutiérrez	Lotus ART	26	+1:02.219	25^{4}	
13	23	(Venezuela) Johnny Cecotto Jr.	Ocean Racing Technology	26	+1:03.298	14	
14	2	(Italy) Julián Leal	Rapax	26	+1:03.416	17	
15	19	(Italy) Kevin Ceccon	Scuderia Coloni	26	+1:03.604	19	
16	22	(Germany) Kevin Mirocha	Ocean Racing Technology	26	+1:04.895	21	
17	15	(United Kingdom) Jolyon Palmer	Arden International	26	+1:05.099	18	
18	25	(Russia) Mikhail Aleshin	Carlin	26	+1:19.938	16	
19	3	(France) Charles Pic	Barwa Addax Team	26	+1:26.905	8	
20	21	(Monaco) Stefano Coletti	Trident Racing	24	Collision	10	
21	14	(Czech Republic) Josef Král	Arden International	24	Collision	9	
Ret	26	(Brazil) Luiz Razia	Team AirAsia	22	Retirement	23	
Ret	17	(Italy) Luca Filippi	Super Nova Racing	21	Collision	24	
Ret	18	(Romania) Michael Herck	Scuderia Coloni	12	Collision	22	
Ret	5	(France) Jules Bianchi	Lotus ART	0	Collision	2	
Ret	4	(Netherlands) Giedo van der Garde	Barwa Addax Team	0	Collision	7	
Fastest lap: Charles Pic (Barwa Addax Team) 1:33.725 (lap 21)

Notes

1. – Esteban Gutiérrez was handed a ten place grid penalty for causing a collision during the Feature Race.

== Standings after the round ==
Drivers' Championship standings

Pos	Driver	Points
1	(Netherlands) Giedo van der Garde	21
2	(United Kingdom) Sam Bird	21
3	(France) Charles Pic	15
4	(France) Romain Grosjean	13
5	(Monaco) Stefano Coletti	10

Teams' Championship standings

Pos	Team	Points
1	(Spain) Barwa Addax Team	36
2	(United Kingdom) iSport International	29
3	(France) DAMS	13
4	(Malaysia) Team AirAsia	11
5	(Italy) Trident Racing	10

- Note: Only the top five positions are included for both sets of standings.

== See also ==
- 2011 Spanish Grand Prix
- 2011 Catalunya GP3 Series round

Previous round: 2011 Turkish GP2 round	GP2 Series; 2011 season	Next round: 2011 Monaco GP2 round
Previous round: 2010 Spanish GP2 Series round	Spanish GP2 round	Next round: 2012 Spanish GP2 Series round
