= 2011 Monza GP2 Series round =

Motor Race

(Italy) 2011 Italian GP2 round
Round details
- Round 9 of 9 rounds in the 2011 GP2 Series
- Location: Autodromo Nazionale Monza, Monza, Italy
- Course: Permanent racing facility 5.793 km (3.6 mi)

GP2 Series

Feature race
- Date: 10 September 2011
- Laps: 30

Pole position
Driver	(France) Charles Pic	Barwa Addax Team
- Time: 1:32.349

Podium
First	(Italy) Luca Filippi	Scuderia Coloni
Second	(France) Charles Pic	Barwa Addax Team
Third	(France) Romain Grosjean	DAMS

Fastest lap
Driver	(Italy) Luca Filippi	Scuderia Coloni
- Time: 1:33.367 (on lap 27)

Sprint race
- Date: 11 September 2011
- Laps: 21

Podium
First	(Germany) Christian Vietoris	Racing Engineering
Second	(Switzerland) Fabio Leimer	Rapax
Third	(France) Jules Bianchi	Lotus ART

Fastest lap
Driver	(Italy) Luca Filippi	Scuderia Coloni
- Time: 1:32.567 (on lap 18)

The 2011 Italian GP2 Series round was a GP2 Series motor race held on September 10 and 11, 2011 at Autodromo Nazionale Monza, Italy. It was the final round of the 2011 GP2 season. The race supported the 2011 Italian Grand Prix. This was the last of the season for series, but GP2 will race a non-championship round in Abu Dhabi.

After Romain Grosjean clinched Drivers' Championship in the previous round, the contest for the Teams' title continued as Barwa Addax was only 8 points ahead DAMS in the standings, but the Spanish team won the title after the last race.

== Classification ==
=== Qualifying ===
Pos	No.	Driver	Team	Time	Grid
1	3	(France) Charles Pic	Barwa Addax Team	1:32.349	1
2	19	(Italy) Luca Filippi	Scuderia Coloni	1:32.460	2
3	1	(Switzerland) Fabio Leimer	Rapax	1:32.485	3
4	25	(Portugal) Álvaro Parente	Carlin	1:32.600	4
5	11	(France) Romain Grosjean	DAMS	1:32.630	5
6	7	(Spain) Dani Clos	Racing Engineering	1:32.684	6
7	8	(Germany) Christian Vietoris	Racing Engineering	1:32.727	7
8	17	(United Kingdom) Adam Carroll	Super Nova Racing	1:32.761	8
9	9	(United Kingdom) Sam Bird	iSport International	1:32.801	9
10	24	(United Kingdom) Max Chilton	Carlin	1:32.811	10
11	15	(United Kingdom) Jolyon Palmer	Arden International	1:32.848	11
12	14	(Czech Republic) Josef Král	Arden International	1:32.858	12
13	18	(Romania) Michael Herck	Scuderia Coloni	1:32.865	13
14	27	(Italy) Davide Valsecchi	Caterham Team AirAsia	1:33.019	14
15	10	(Sweden) Marcus Ericsson	iSport International	1:33.121	15
16	20	(Venezuela) Rodolfo González	Trident Racing	1:33.129	16
17	22	(New Zealand) Brendon Hartley	Ocean Racing Technology	1:33.183	17
18	26	(Brazil) Luiz Razia	Caterham Team AirAsia	1:33.206	18
19	5	(France) Jules Bianchi	Lotus ART	1:33.293	19
20	4	(Netherlands) Giedo van der Garde	Barwa Addax Team	1:33.297	20
21	16	(Malaysia) Fairuz Fauzy	Super Nova Racing	1:33.452	21
22	23	(Venezuela) Johnny Cecotto Jr.	Ocean Racing Technology	1:33.571	22
23	2	(Colombia) Julián Leal	Rapax	1:33.646	23
24	21	(Monaco) Stéphane Richelmi	Trident Racing	1:34.150	24
25	6	(Mexico) Esteban Gutiérrez	Lotus ART	1:35.228	25
26	12	(Norway) Pål Varhaug	DAMS	1:39.190	26

=== Feature Race ===
Pos	No.	Driver	Team	Laps	Time/Retired	Grid	Points
1	19	(Italy) Luca Filippi	Scuderia Coloni	30	47:47.704	2	10+1
2	3	(France) Charles Pic	Barwa Addax Team	30	+5.627	1	8+2
3	11	(France) Romain Grosjean	DAMS	30	+6.214	5	6
4	9	(United Kingdom) Sam Bird	iSport International	30	+9.992	9	5
5	17	(United Kingdom) Adam Carroll	Super Nova Racing	30	+14.904	8	4
6	8	(Germany) Christian Vietoris	Racing Engineering	30	+16.710	7	3
7	1	(Switzerland) Fabio Leimer	Rapax	30	+18.058	3	2
8	5	(France) Jules Bianchi	Lotus ART	30	+22.787	19	1
9	6	(Mexico) Esteban Gutiérrez	Lotus ART	30	+28.444	25	
10	26	(Brazil) Luiz Razia	Caterham Team AirAsia	30	+31.661	18	
11	12	(Norway) Pål Varhaug	DAMS	30	+36.000	26	
12	25	(Portugal) Álvaro Parente	Carlin	30	+44.096	4	
13	7	(Spain) Dani Clos	Racing Engineering	30	+46.877	6	
14	10	(Sweden) Marcus Ericsson	iSport International	30	+49.690	15	
15	21	(Monaco) Stéphane Richelmi	Trident Racing	30	+50.876	24	
16	2	(Colombia) Julián Leal	Rapax	30	+58.003	23	
17	23	(Venezuela) Johnny Cecotto Jr.	Ocean Racing Technology	30	+1:06.275	22	
18	16	(Malaysia) Fairuz Fauzy	Super Nova Racing	30	+1:10.221	21	
19	20	(Venezuela) Rodolfo González	Trident Racing	30	+1:20.119	16	
20	27	(Italy) Davide Valsecchi	Caterham Team AirAsia	29	+1 lap	14	
21	4	(Netherlands) Giedo van der Garde	Barwa Addax Team	29	+1 lap	20	
22	22	(New Zealand) Brendon Hartley	Ocean Racing Technology	29	+1 lap	17	
Ret	24	(United Kingdom) Max Chilton	Carlin	2	Collision damage	10	
Ret	14	(Czech Republic) Josef Král	Arden International	1	Collision	12	
Ret	15	(United Kingdom) Jolyon Palmer	Arden International	1	Collision	11	
Ret	18	(Romania) Michael Herck	Scuderia Coloni	1	Collision	13	
Fastest lap: Luca Filippi (Scuderia Coloni) 1:33.367 (lap 27)

=== Sprint Race ===
Pos	No.	Driver	Team	Laps	Time/Retired	Grid	Points
1	8	(Germany) Christian Vietoris	Racing Engineering	21	32:51.770	3	6
2	1	(Switzerland) Fabio Leimer	Rapax	21	+0.730	2	5
3	5	(France) Jules Bianchi	Lotus ART	21	+2.851	1	4
4	9	(United Kingdom) Sam Bird	iSport International	21	+3.556	5	3
5	19	(Italy) Luca Filippi	Scuderia Coloni	21	+4.010	8	2+1
6	6	(Mexico) Esteban Gutiérrez	Lotus ART	21	+10.957	9	1
7	7	(Spain) Dani Clos	Racing Engineering	21	+11.584	13	
8	10	(Sweden) Marcus Ericsson	iSport International	21	+16.079	14	
9	26	(Brazil) Luiz Razia	Caterham Team AirAsia	21	+17.619	10	
10	12	(Norway) Pål Varhaug	DAMS	21	+19.814	11	
11	17	(United Kingdom) Adam Carroll	Super Nova Racing	21	+22.136	4	
12	25	(Portugal) Álvaro Parente	Carlin	21	+22.617	12	
13	4	(Netherlands) Giedo van der Garde	Barwa Addax Team	21	+22.966	21	
14	21	(Monaco) Stéphane Richelmi	Trident Racing	21	+24.538	15	
15	23	(Venezuela) Johnny Cecotto Jr.	Ocean Racing Technology	21	+35.241	17	
16	20	(Venezuela) Rodolfo González	Trident Racing	21	+35.408	19	
17	14	(Czech Republic) Josef Král	Arden International	21	+35.681	24	
18	24	(United Kingdom) Max Chilton	Carlin	21	+36.244	23	
19	15	(United Kingdom) Jolyon Palmer	Arden International	19	+37.728	25	
20	22	(New Zealand) Brendon Hartley	Ocean Racing Technology	21	+1:23.392	22	
21	11	(France) Romain Grosjean	DAMS	19	+2 laps	6	
Ret	27	(Italy) Davide Valsecchi	Caterham Team AirAsia	12	Spun off	20	
Ret	2	(Colombia) Julián Leal	Rapax	0	Accident	16	
Ret	3	(France) Charles Pic	Barwa Addax Team	0	Collision	7	
DNS	16	(Malaysia) Fairuz Fauzy	Super Nova Racing	0	Not started	18	
DNS	18	(Romania) Michael Herck	Scuderia Coloni		Injury	^{1}	
Fastest lap: Luca Filippi (Scuderia Coloni) 1:32.567 (lap 18)

Notes

- ^1 – Herck was due to start from last grid position after being handed a ten grid position penalty for causing a collision during Feature Race, but did not take the start because of a hand injury sustained in the collision.

== Final standings ==
Drivers' Championship standings

Pos	Driver	Points
1	(France) Romain Grosjean	83
2	(Italy) Luca Filippi	54
3	(France) Jules Bianchi	53
4	(France) Charles Pic	52
5	(Netherlands) Giedo van der Garde	49

Teams' Championship standings

Pos	Team	Points
1	(Spain) Barwa Addax Team	101
2	(France) DAMS	89
3	(Spain) Racing Engineering	75
4	(United Kingdom) iSport International	70
5	(France) Lotus ART	68

- Note: Only the top five positions are included for both sets of standings.

== See also ==
- 2011 Italian Grand Prix
- 2011 Monza GP3 Series round

Previous round: 2011 Belgian GP2 round	GP2 Series; 2011 season	Next round: 2011 GP2 Final (NC)
Previous round: 2010 Italian GP2 round	Italian GP2 round	Next round: 2012 Monza GP2 Series round
