= 2011 GP2 Asia Series =

The 2011 GP2 Asia Series was the fourth and final season of the GP2 Asia Series, and the second to be held entirely in a single calendar year.

== Season summary ==
Rather than starting at the end of 2010 and running through the winter as with the previous two seasons of GP2 Asia, the 2011 season did not start until the beginning of February, to allow for the delivery of the brand new GP2/11 car to the teams and allow for testing before using it in the Asia Series. Previously the Asia Series had used the first generation GP2 car. The season also saw the début of three teams in the Series: two new teams, Carlin and Team Air Asia, as well as Racing Engineering, who had not competed in the Asia Series since its establishment. The race in Abu Dhabi was the first time the GP2/11 chassis was used.

The season was originally scheduled for six races to be held at three meetings, beginning on 11 February at the Yas Marina Circuit in the United Arab Emirates, and finishing on 13 March at the Bahrain International Circuit. However, both meetings due to be held in Bahrain, scheduled for 17–19 February and 11–13 March, were cancelled due to anti-government protests in the country's capital, Manama. On 1 March 2011, series organisers added a replacement final round of the Asia Series, to be held at the Autodromo Enzo e Dino Ferrari in Imola, Italy on 19–20 March.

Inaugural Asia Series champion Romain Grosjean of the DAMS team won the championship for the second time after title rival Jules Bianchi of Lotus ART was taken out of the final race by Super Nova Racing's Fairuz Fauzy. Giedo van der Garde finished third for the Barwa Addax Team, taking podiums in both races at Imola. As well as feature race victories apiece for Grosjean and Bianchi, sprint race victories were taken by Stefano Coletti of Trident Racing and Dani Clos of Racing Engineering. As well as Grosjean's drivers' championship win, DAMS also claimed the teams' championship by three points from Lotus ART.

== Teams and drivers ==
All of the teams used the Dallara GP2/11 chassis with Mecachrome 4.0 litre (244 cu in) V8 engines order and with tyres supplied by Pirelli.

Team	No.	Driver	Rounds
(United Kingdom) iSport International	1	(Sweden) Marcus Ericsson	All
(United Kingdom) iSport International	2	(United Kingdom) Sam Bird	All
(United Kingdom) Arden International	3	(Czech Republic) Josef Král	All
(United Kingdom) Arden International	4	(United Kingdom) Jolyon Palmer	All
(France) Lotus ART	5	(France) Jules Bianchi	All
(France) Lotus ART	6	(Mexico) Esteban Gutiérrez	All
(United Kingdom) Super Nova Racing	7	(Malaysia) Fairuz Fauzy	All
(United Kingdom) Super Nova Racing	8	(Venezuela) Johnny Cecotto Jr.	All
(France) DAMS	9	(France) Romain Grosjean	All
(France) DAMS	10	(Norway) Pål Varhaug	All
(Italy) Scuderia Coloni	11	(Romania) Michael Herck	All
(Italy) Scuderia Coloni	12	(United Kingdom) James Jakes	1
(Italy) Scuderia Coloni	12	(Italy) Luca Filippi	2
(Portugal) Ocean Racing Technology	14	(Italy) Andrea Caldarelli	All
(Portugal) Ocean Racing Technology	15	(United Kingdom) Oliver Turvey	All
(Spain) Barwa Addax Team	16	(France) Charles Pic	All
(Spain) Barwa Addax Team	17	(Netherlands) Giedo van der Garde	All
(Italy) Trident Racing	18	(Monaco) Stefano Coletti	All
(Italy) Trident Racing	19	(Venezuela) Rodolfo González	All
(Italy) Rapax	20	(Switzerland) Fabio Leimer	All
(Italy) Rapax	21	(Italy) Julián Leal (Note: Leal is a Colombian driver who competed under an Italian racing licence.)	All
(Spain) Racing Engineering	22	(France) Nathanaël Berthon	All
(Spain) Racing Engineering	23	(Spain) Dani Clos	All
(United Kingdom) Carlin	24	(Russia) Mikhail Aleshin	All
(United Kingdom) Carlin	25	(United Kingdom) Max Chilton	All
(Malaysia) Team AirAsia	26	(Brazil) Luiz Razia	All
(Malaysia) Team AirAsia	27	(Italy) Davide Valsecchi	All

== Calendar ==
The calendar was announced on 7 October 2010, with three rounds to be held in February and March, down from four in 2009–2010. Organisers explained the reduction of the calendar as being necessary because of the need to deliver the brand-new Dallara GP2/11 chassis to all teams. Yas Marina hosted the season-opening event, before two scheduled meetings in Bahrain. The Bahrain events were subsequently cancelled due to civil unrest in the country, and was later replaced by a special event to be held at Imola. A single venue in Europe and the Losail International Circuit in Qatar were proposed as possible replacements. A yellow background indicates a non-Asian event.

Round		Circuit	Date	Pole position	Fastest Lap	Winning driver	Winning team	Report	Ref
1	F	(United Arab Emirates) Yas Marina Circuit (Corkscrew Circuit)	11 February	(France) Romain Grosjean	(France) Jules Bianchi	(France) Jules Bianchi	(France) Lotus ART	Report	
1	S	(United Arab Emirates) Yas Marina Circuit (Corkscrew Circuit)	12 February		(France) Charles Pic (Note: Charles Pic set the fastest lap, but did not finish in the top 10, so was ineligible to be the point-scorer for the fastest lap. Jules Bianchi was the point-scorer instead for setting the fastest lap of those finishing in the top 10.)	(Monaco) Stefano Coletti	(Italy) Trident Racing	Report	
–	F	Bahrain International Circuit, Sakhir	18 February	Not held due to civil unrest					
–	S	Bahrain International Circuit, Sakhir	19 February	Not held due to civil unrest					
–	F	Bahrain International Circuit, Sakhir	12 March	Not held due to civil unrest					
–	S	Bahrain International Circuit, Sakhir	13 March	Not held due to civil unrest					
2	F	(Italy) Autodromo Enzo e Dino Ferrari, Imola	19 March	(France) Romain Grosjean	(France) Romain Grosjean	(France) Romain Grosjean	(France) DAMS	Report	
2	S	(Italy) Autodromo Enzo e Dino Ferrari, Imola	20 March		(France) Romain Grosjean	(Spain) Dani Clos	(Spain) Racing Engineering	Report	

== Championship standings ==
Scoring system

Points are awarded to the top 8 classified finishers in the Feature race, and to the top 6 classified finishers in the Sprint race. The pole-sitter in the feature race will also receive two points, and one point is given to the driver who set the fastest lap inside the top ten in both the feature and sprint races. No extra points are awarded to the pole-sitter in the sprint race.

Point system for Feature Race
Position	**1st**	**2nd**	**3rd**	**4th**	**5th**	**6th**	**7th**	**8th**	**Pole**	**FL**
Points	10	8	6	5	4	3	2	1	2	1

Point system for Sprint Race
Position	**1st**	**2nd**	**3rd**	**4th**	**5th**	**6th**	**FL**
Points	6	5	4	3	2	1	1

=== Drivers' Championship ===
Pos	Driver	YMC (United Arab Emirates)		IMO (Italy)		Points
1	(France) Romain Grosjean	**2**	Ret	**1**	7	24
2	(France) Jules Bianchi	1	8	3	Ret	18
3	(Netherlands) Giedo van der Garde	5	23	2	3	16
4	(Monaco) Stefano Coletti	8	1	5	Ret	11
5	(Switzerland) Fabio Leimer	10	6	6	2	9
6	(Sweden) Marcus Ericsson	4	3	10	16	9
7	(Italy) Davide Valsecchi	3	4	DSQ	17	9
8	(Romania) Michael Herck	13	5	4	5	9
9	(Spain) Dani Clos	Ret	22	7	1	8
10	(Czech Republic) Josef Král	6	2	12	9	8
11	(Mexico) Esteban Gutiérrez	Ret	12	11	4	3
12	(United Kingdom) Sam Bird	7	Ret	Ret	Ret	2
13	(Norway) Pål Varhaug	Ret	20	13	6	1
14	(Malaysia) Fairuz Fauzy	Ret	15	8	Ret	1
15	(Venezuela) Johnny Cecotto Jr.	15	7	15	19	0
16	(United Kingdom) Oliver Turvey	18	19	14	8	0
17	(Venezuela) Rodolfo González	11	9	9	Ret	0
18	(France) Charles Pic	9	21	20	11	0
19	(United Kingdom) Jolyon Palmer	14	10	18	Ret	0
20	(Italy) Luca Filippi			22	10	0
21	(Italy) Andrea Caldarelli	16	11	17	12	0
22	(United Kingdom) Max Chilton	12	18	21	15	0
23	(France) Nathanaël Berthon	Ret	14	Ret	13	0
24	(United Kingdom) James Jakes	17†	13			0
25	(Brazil) Luiz Razia	Ret	16	Ret	14	0
26	(Italy) Julián Leal	Ret	17	16	18	0
27	(Russia) Mikhail Aleshin	Ret	24†	19	20†	0
Pos	Driver	YMC (United Arab Emirates)		IMO (Italy)		Points

Key
Colour	Result
Gold	Winner
Silver	2nd place
Bronze	3rd place
Green	Other points position
Blue	Other classified position
Blue	Not classified, finished (NC)
Purple	Not classified, retired (Ret)
Red	Did not qualify (DNQ)
Red	Did not pre-qualify (DNPQ)
Black	Disqualified (DSQ)
White	Did not start (DNS)
White	Race cancelled (C)
Blank	Did not practice (DNP)
Blank	Excluded (EX)
Blank	Did not arrive (DNA)
Blank	Withdrawn (WD)
Text formatting	Meaning
**Bold**	Pole position point(s)
Italics	Fastest lap point(s)

Notes:

- † — Drivers did not finish the race, but were classified as they completed over 90% of the race distance.

=== Teams' Championship ===
Pos	Team	Car No.	YMC (United Arab Emirates)		IMO (Italy)		Points
1	(France) DAMS	9	**2**	Ret	**1**	7	25
1	(France) DAMS	10	Ret	20	13	6	25
2	(France) Lotus ART	5	1	8	3	Ret	22
2	(France) Lotus ART	6	Ret	12	11	4	22
3	(Spain) Barwa Addax Team	16	9	21	20	11	16
3	(Spain) Barwa Addax Team	17	5	23	2	3	16
4	(Italy) Trident Racing	18	8	1	5	Ret	11
4	(Italy) Trident Racing	19	11	9	9	Ret	11
5	(United Kingdom) iSport International	1	4	3	10	16	11
5	(United Kingdom) iSport International	2	7	Ret	Ret	Ret	11
6	(Italy) Rapax	20	10	6	6	2	9
6	(Italy) Rapax	21	Ret	17	16	18	9
7	(Malaysia) Team AirAsia	26	Ret	16	Ret	14	9
7	(Malaysia) Team AirAsia	27	3	4	DSQ	17	9
8	(Italy) Scuderia Coloni	11	13	5	4	5	9
8	(Italy) Scuderia Coloni	12	17†	13	22	10	9
9	(Spain) Racing Engineering	22	Ret	14	Ret	13	8
9	(Spain) Racing Engineering	23	Ret	22	7	1	8
10	(United Kingdom) Arden International	3	6	2	12	9	8
10	(United Kingdom) Arden International	4	14	10	18	Ret	8
11	(United Kingdom) Super Nova Racing	7	Ret	15	8	Ret	1
11	(United Kingdom) Super Nova Racing	8	15	7	15	19†	1
12	(Portugal) Ocean Racing Technology	14	16	11	17	12	0
12	(Portugal) Ocean Racing Technology	15	18	19	14	8	0
13	(United Kingdom) Carlin	24	Ret	24†	19	20†	0
13	(United Kingdom) Carlin	25	12	18	21	15	0
Pos	Team	Car No.	YMC (United Arab Emirates)		IMO (Italy)		Points

Key
Colour	Result
Gold	Winner
Silver	2nd place
Bronze	3rd place
Green	Other points position
Blue	Other classified position
Blue	Not classified, finished (NC)
Purple	Not classified, retired (Ret)
Red	Did not qualify (DNQ)
Red	Did not pre-qualify (DNPQ)
Black	Disqualified (DSQ)
White	Did not start (DNS)
White	Race cancelled (C)
Blank	Did not practice (DNP)
Blank	Excluded (EX)
Blank	Did not arrive (DNA)
Blank	Withdrawn (WD)
Text formatting	Meaning
**Bold**	Pole position point(s)
Italics	Fastest lap point(s)

Notes:

- † — Drivers did not finish the race, but were classified as they completed over 90% of the race distance.
