= Addax Team =

Spanish motorsport team

(Spain) Addax Team
- Founded: 2009
- Folded: 2013
- Team principal(s): Alejandro Agag; Ignacio Muñoz-Alonso
- Former series: GP2 Series; GP2 Asia Series; GP3 Series
- Noted drivers: (Venezuela) Johnny Cecotto Jr. (France) Romain Grosjean (Mexico) Sergio Pérez (Russia) Vitaly Petrov (France) Charles Pic (Netherlands) Giedo van der Garde
- Teams' Championships: GP2 Series: 2011

Addax Team, also known as Barwa Addax Team, was a Spanish motorsport team which competed in the GP2 Series, GP3 Series and GP2 Asia Series. In 2007, Alejandro Agag acquired Campos Racing, which he renamed Addax, after founding Addax Capital LLP in 2006. The team won the 2008 GP2 Series and won the title again in 2011.

== Team history ==
=== GP2 Series ===
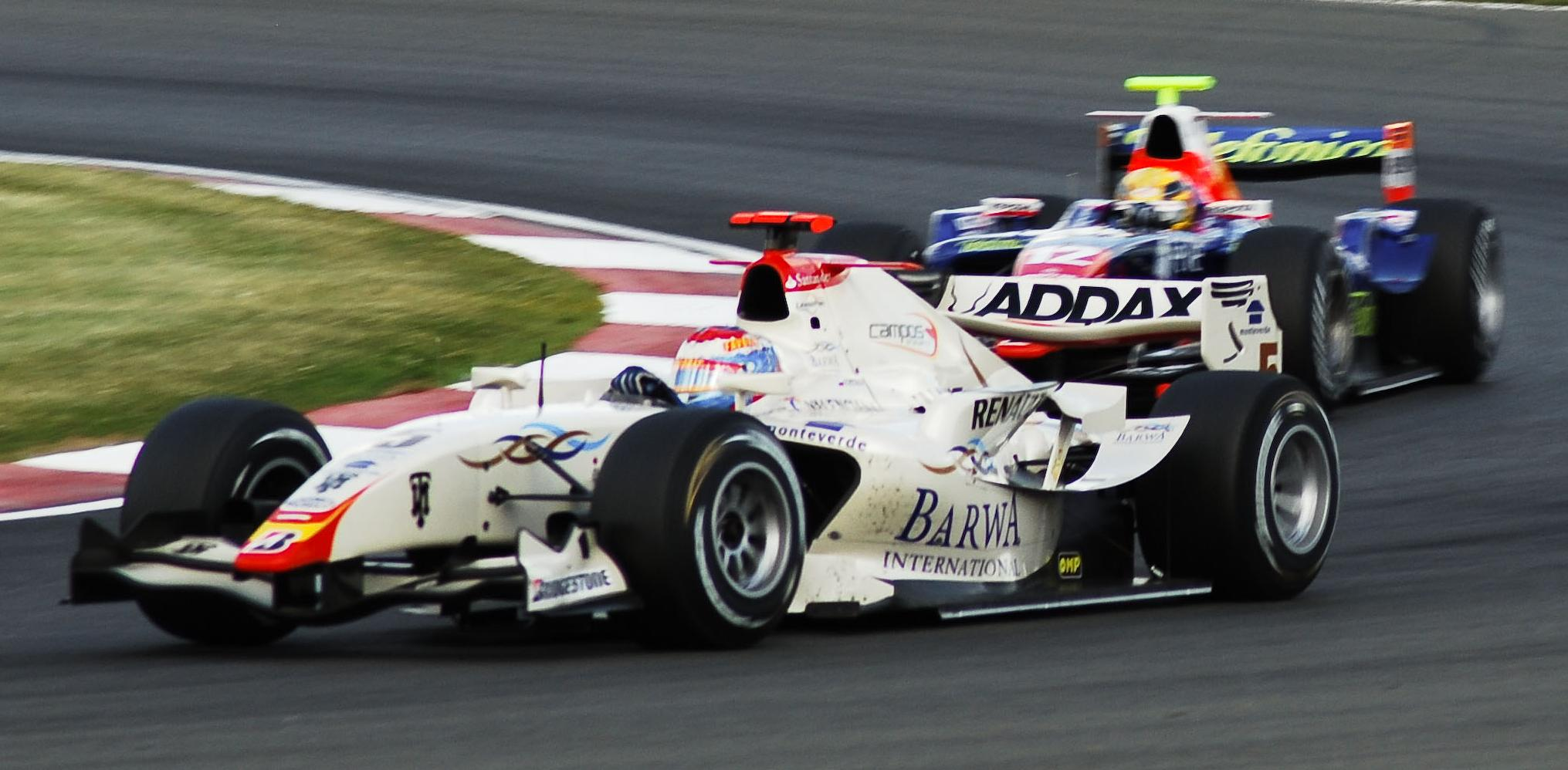
Vitaly Petrov driving for Campos Racing at the 2008 Silverstone GP2 Series round.

Barwa Addax was formed as a result of Alejandro Agag purchase of the Campos Racing GP2 team. Campos Racing was started by former Formula One driver Adrián Campos in 1998, and competed in the GP2 Series since its inaugural season in 2005. After the 2008 season, in which Campos won the teams' championship, he elected to step down and pass control of the GP2 team to Agag, a businessman with motorsport interests. Campos Racing continues to compete in the European F3 Open Championship, and in 2010 they entered Formula One as Campos Meta 1 before being taken over and renamed Hispania Racing. Agag renamed the team Addax after the eponymous species of antelope, and retained the name of team sponsor Barwa International, a Qatari real estate company, for the 2009 season.

Addax signed 2008 GP2 Asia Series season champion Romain Grosjean and existing Campos driver Vitaly Petrov for its 2009 campaign. Grosjean took the team's first pole position during the opening qualifying session of the season, in Barcelona. He also took the team's first win, leading home Petrov in a 1–2 finish. Both drivers quickly established themselves as championship contenders.

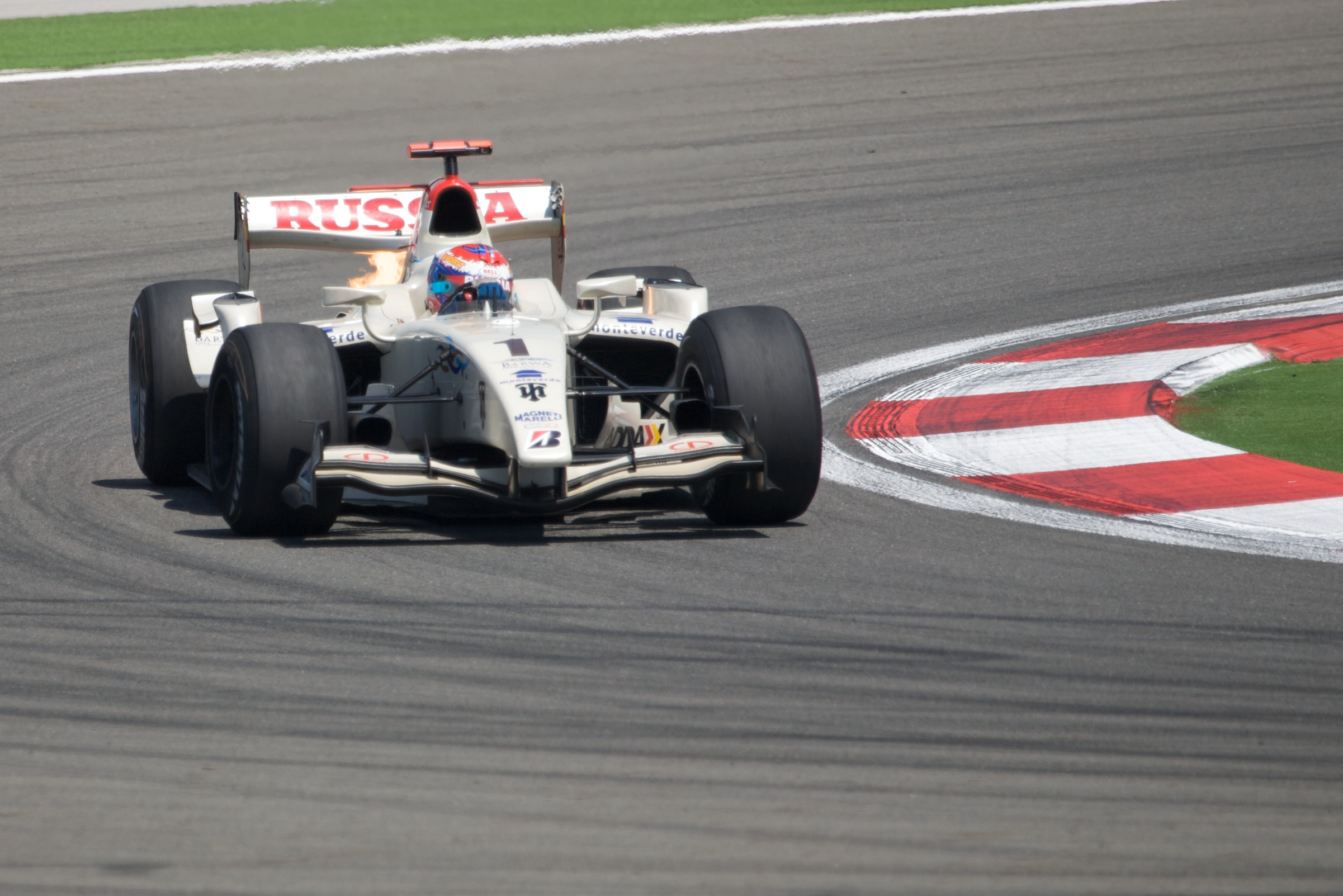
Vitaly Petrov driving for Barwa Addax at the 2009 Istanbul Park GP2 Series round.

Following Nelson Piquet Jr.'s departure from the Renault F1 team, Grosjean, who was the team's third driver, was drafted in to replace him from the 2009 European Grand Prix onwards. Grosjean's seat was taken by Durango driver Davide Valsecchi. Despite his absence from the final eight races of the season, Grosjean finished fourth in the championship with two wins, a tally matched by Petrov, who was Nico Hülkenberg's main rival for the championship and eventually finished runner-up. Addax had the consolation of winning the teams' championship in the first season competing with its new name.

For the 2010 season, Petrov graduated to Formula One, also with Renault, and Valsecchi moved to the iSport International team, so Addax signed second-year drivers Giedo van der Garde and Sergio Pérez. Pérez quickly assumed the role of team leader, winning five races and establishing himself as eventual champion Pastor Maldonado's main rival, whilst Van der Garde finished seventh overall with three podium finishes. Addax was narrowly beaten to the teams' championship by Rapax, which scored five more points.

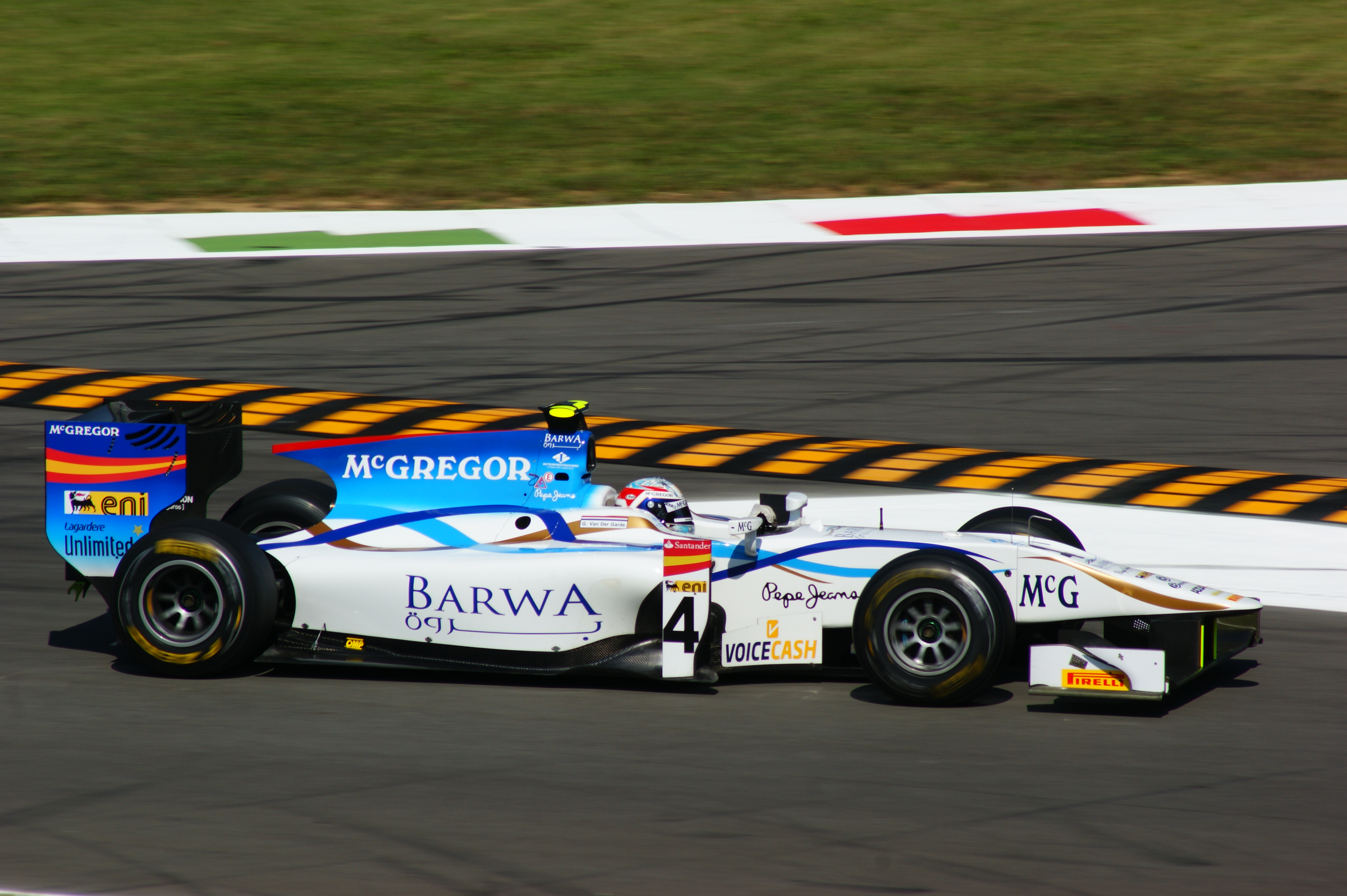
Giedo van der Garde driving for Addax at the 2011 Monza GP2 Series round.

Van der Garde remained with the team for the 2011 season, and the F1-bound Pérez was replaced by Charles Pic, now also in his second year in GP2. Although he did not win a race, Van der Garde scored a consistent string of podium finishes in the first half of the season which established him in second place in the championship behind runaway leader Grosjean, now back in the series and driving for DAMS. However, he slipped back to fifth in the standings after a poor end to the season and was pipped by Pic, who impressed with three pole positions and two race victories. Despite finishing fourth and fifth in the drivers' standings, Addax won its second teams' championship by virtue of the fact that the top three—Grosjean, Luca Filippi and Jules Bianchi—had all been partnered with teammates who scored much fewer points by comparison.

For the 2012 season, Pic graduated to F1 with Marussia and Van der Garde moved to the Caterham Racing team as part of his deal to become the Caterham F1 team's reserve driver; Addax signed the unfancied pairing of Johnny Cecotto Jr. and Josef Král to replace them. Having previously scored a meagre four points over more than two years of GP2, Cecotto made a breakthrough with Addax, winning the feature races at Monaco (from pole position) and Hockenheim. However, his inconsistency limited him to ninth overall in the drivers' championship. On the other side of the garage, Král was replaced by HRT F1 third driver Dani Clos for four races after the first round of the championship, and then endured a run of twelve races without scoring, before taking his own first series victory in the sprint race at Monza. He was then replaced for the final two races of the championship by rookie Jake Rosenzweig, who, like Clos before him, failed to score. As a result of this inconsistent season, Addax dropped to eighth place in the teams' standings.

=== GP2 Asia Series ===
Addax also took over Campos Racing's entry in the GP2 Asia Series. In the 2008–09 season, Petrov and Pérez finished fifth and seventh respectively in the drivers' standings, with three wins between them, whilst Addax finished third in the teams' standings. For the 2009–10 season, the team ran the drivers it would employ for the main series (Pérez and Van der Garde) at some rounds, but also fielded Max Chilton, Luiz Razia and Rodolfo González at others; the changes restricted the team to tenth in the championship. For the final GP2 Asia season in 2011, Addax reverted to running its main series drivers (Van der Garde and Pic) throughout. Van der Garde took two podium finishes to finish third overall, but Pic failed to score any points.

=== GP3 Series ===
Addax was one of ten teams granted entries for the inaugural GP3 Series championship in 2010. It was one of only two existing GP2 teams to compete in GP3 as well, the other being ART Grand Prix. The team's three drivers were Felipe Guimarães, Pablo Sánchez López and Mirko Bortolotti. None of the three featured strongly, with two podium finishes between them the team's best results, and they finished 16th, 30th and 11th in the championship respectively. Addax finished eighth in the teams' championship.

For the 2011 season, Addax recruited Dominic Storey, Gabriel Chaves and Dean Smith. Chaves was the only driver to complete the season, as Storey was replaced by Tom Dillmann after two rounds of the championship, and Vittorio Ghirelli took Smith's seat for the final round. On this occasion, Smith was the best of the five, scoring two podium finishes and setting a fastest lap to take 12th overall; Chaves was 19th and Storey 37th; Dillman and Ghirelli were 14th and 25th having also competed for other teams. Addax again finished eighth in the teams' championship, but with eight more points than in 2010. Addax elected to withdraw from the GP3 Series following the conclusion of the 2011 season.

== Staff (2009) ==
- Founder Adrián Campos Suñer
- Team Principal & Owner Alejandro Agag
- Team Manager Alberto Longo Álvarez de Sotomayor
- Chief Financial Officer Jose Julio Rosell
- Technical Director Chris Murphy
- Chief Logistic Caterina Sarrión
- Press Officer Antonio Moralejo
- RRPP Marta Viscasillas
- Track Engineer Emilio Lozano
- Track Engineer Peter Wyss
- Track Engineer Phillip Gautheron
- Chief Mechanic Enrique Colomina
- Mechanics: Vicente Andreu, Daniel Lluch, Miguél Angel Rovira, Javier López & Gustavo Pochetino

== Results ==
=== GP2 Series ===
Year	Car	Drivers	Races	Wins	Poles	F.L.	Points	D.C.	T.C.
2009	Dallara GP2/08-Mecachrome	(Russia) Vitaly Petrov	20	2	2	2	75	**2nd**	**2nd**
2009	Dallara GP2/08-Mecachrome	(France) Romain Grosjean	12	2	3	2	45	4th	**2nd**
2009	Dallara GP2/08-Mecachrome	(Italy) Davide Valsecchi (Note: Davide Valsecchi also raced for Durango, for whom he scored 10 points.)	8	0	0	0	12	17th	**2nd**
2010	Dallara GP2/08-Mecachrome	(Netherlands) Giedo van der Garde	20	0	0	0	39	7th	**2nd**
2010	Dallara GP2/08-Mecachrome	(Mexico) Sergio Pérez	20	5	1	5	71	**2nd**	**2nd**
2011	Dallara GP2/11-Mecachrome	(France) Charles Pic	18	2	3	0	52	4th	**1st**
2011	Dallara GP2/11-Mecachrome	(Netherlands) Giedo van der Garde	18	0	1	1	49	5th	**1st**
2012	Dallara GP2/11-Mecachrome	(Venezuela) Johnny Cecotto Jr.	24	2	1	1	104	9th	8th
2012	Dallara GP2/11-Mecachrome	(Czech Republic) Josef Král	16	1	0	0	27	17th	8th
2012	Dallara GP2/11-Mecachrome	(Spain) Dani Clos	4	0	0	0	0	28th	8th
2012	Dallara GP2/11-Mecachrome	(United States) Jake Rosenzweig	4	0	0	0	0	32nd	8th
2013	Dallara GP2/11-Mecachrome	(Indonesia) Rio Haryanto	22	0	0	0	22	19th	12th
2013	Dallara GP2/11-Mecachrome	(United States) Jake Rosenzweig	22	0	0	0	0	28th	12th

=== In detail ===
(key) (Races in bold indicate pole position) (Races in italics indicate fastest lap)

Year	Chassis Engine Tyres	Drivers	1	2	3	4	5	6	7	8	9	10	11	12	13	14	15	16	17	18	19	20	21	22	23	24	T.C.	Points
2009	GP2/08; Renault; **B**		CAT; FEA	CAT; SPR	MON; FEA	MON; FEA	IST; FEA	IST; SPR	SIL; FEA	SIL; SPR	NÜR; FEA	NÜR; SPR	HUN; FEA	HUN; SPR	VAL; FEA	VAL; SPR	SPA; FEA	SPA; SPR	MNZ; FEA	MNZ; SPR	ALG; FEA	ALG; SPR					2nd	122
2009	GP2/08; Renault; **B**	(Russia) Vitaly Petrov	2	9	2	6	1	3	15	10	4	4	Ret	12	1	3	Ret	6	**2**	5	**4**	Ret					2nd	122
2009	GP2/08; Renault; **B**	(France) Romain Grosjean	**1**	2	**1**	17†	Ret	12	**5**	4	18†	5	10	4													2nd	122
2009	GP2/08; Renault; **B**	(Italy) Davide Valsecchi													10	Ret	Ret	8	14	9	7	14					2nd	122
2010	GP2/08; Renault; **B**		CAT; FEA	CAT; SPR	MON; FEA	MON; SPR	IST; FEA	IST; SPR	VAL; FEA	VAL; SPR	SIL; FEA	SIL; SPR	HOC; FEA	HOC; SPR	HUN; FEA	HUN; SPR	SPA; FEA	SPA; SPR	MNZ; FEA	MNZ; SPR	YMC; FEA	YMC; SPR					2nd	110
2010	GP2/08; Renault; **B**	(Netherlands) Giedo van der Garde	20	9	6	2	4	3	4	2	9	7	12	9	5	4	9	2	Ret	Ret	Ret	19					2nd	110
2010	GP2/08; Renault; **B**	(Mexico) Sergio Pérez	4	Ret	1	6	DSQ	7	**11**	16	5	1	2	1	3	Ret	7	1	Ret	13	1	Ret					2nd	110
2011	GP2/11; Mecachrome; **P**		IST; FEA	IST; SPR	CAT; FEA	CAT; SPR	MON; FEA	MON; SPR	VAL; FEA	VAL; SPR	SIL; FEA	SIL; SPR	NÜR; FEA	NÜR; SPR	HUN; FEA	HUN; SPR	SPA; FEA	SPA; SPR	MNZ; FEA	MNZ; SPR							1st	101
2011	GP2/11; Mecachrome; **P**	(France) Charles Pic	7	4	1	19	8	1	**Ret**	Ret	11	10	**2**	DSQ	2	13	Ret	19	**2**	Ret							1st	101
2011	GP2/11; Mecachrome; **P**	(Netherlands) Giedo van der Garde	4	2	**2**	Ret	Ret	9	2	3	8	3	6	Ret	4	4	Ret	20	21	13							1st	101
2012	GP2/11; Mecachrome; **P**		SEP; FEA	SEP; SPR	BHR1; FEA	BHR1; SPR	BHR2; FEA	BHR2; SPR	CAT; FEA	CAT; SPR	MON; FEA	MON; SPR	VAL; FEA	VAL; SPR	SIL; FEA	SIL; SPR	HOC; FEA	HOC; SPR	HUN; FEA	HUN; SPR	SPA; FEA	SPA; SPR	MNZ; FEA	MNZ; SPR	MRN; FEA	MRN; SPR	8th	131
2012	GP2/11; Mecachrome; **P**	(Venezuela) Johnny Cecotto Jr.	Ret	22	Ret	22†	9	Ret	18	13	**1**	Ret	DSQ	Ret	2	18†	1	6	Ret	Ret	17	Ret	2	5	Ret	9	8th	131
2012	GP2/11; Mecachrome; **P**	(Czech Republic) Josef Král	14	9					20	16	Ret	10	DSQ	11	16	10	12	13	24†	17	4	1					8th	131
2012	GP2/11; Mecachrome; **P**	(Spain) Dani Clos			19†	11	Ret	Ret																			8th	131
2012	GP2/11; Mecachrome; **P**	(United States) Jake Rosenzweig																					18	19	15	17	8th	131
2013	GP2/11; Mecachrome; **P**		SEP; FEA	SEP; SPR	BHR; FEA	BHR; SPR	CAT; FEA	CAT; SPR	MON; FEA	MON; SPR	SIL; FEA	SIL; SPR	NÜR; FEA	NÜR; SPR	HUN; FEA	HUN; SPR	SPA; FEA	SPA; SPR	MNZ; FEA	MNZ; SPR	MRN; FEA	MRN; SPR	YMC; FEA	YMC; SPR			12th	22
2013	GP2/11; Mecachrome; **P**	(United States) Jake Rosenzweig	18	20	16	19	14	22	14	10	14	21	23	20	25†	15	17	21	Ret	18	15	18	21†	11			12th	22
2013	GP2/11; Mecachrome; **P**	(Indonesia) Rio Haryanto	20	18	15	24	9	24	Ret	16	7	2	18	14	11	10	19	25	14	7	20	11	14	12			12th	22

=== GP2 Final ===
(key) (Races in bold indicate pole position) (Races in italics indicate fastest lap)

Year	Chassis Engine Tyres	Drivers	1	2	T.C.	Points
2011	GP2/11; Mecachrome; **P**		YMC; FEA	YMC; SPR	5th	9
2011	GP2/11; Mecachrome; **P**	(United States) Jake Rosenzweig	Ret	14	5th	9
2011	GP2/11; Mecachrome; **P**	(United Kingdom) Jolyon Palmer	3	4	5th	9

=== GP2 Asia Series ===
(key) (Races in bold indicate pole position) (Races in italics indicate fastest lap)

Year	Chassis Engine Tyres	Drivers	1	2	3	4	5	6	7	8	9	10	11	12	T.C.	Points
2008–09	GP2/05; Renault; **B**		SHI; FEA	SHI; SPR	DUB3; FEA	DUB3; SPR	BHR1; FEA	BHR1; SPR	LSL; FEA	LSL; SPR	SEP; FEA	SEP; SPR	BHR2; FEA	BHR2; SPR	3rd	54
2008–09	GP2/05; Renault; **B**	(Russia) Vitaly Petrov	5	Ret	5	C	10	12	3	2	6	1	19	11	3rd	54
2008–09	GP2/05; Renault; **B**	(Mexico) Sergio Pérez	Ret	7	6	C	8	1	2	1	Ret	6	12	9	3rd	54
2009–10	GP2/05; Renault; **B**		YMC1; FEA	YMC1; SPR	YMC2; FEA	YMC2; SPR	BHR1; FEA	BHR1; SPR	BHR2; FEA	BHR2; SPR					10th	5
2009–10	GP2/05; Renault; **B**	(United Kingdom) Max Chilton	16	17			18	12	19^{†}	15					10th	5
2009–10	GP2/05; Renault; **B**	(Netherlands) Giedo van der Garde			Ret	19									10th	5
2009–10	GP2/05; Renault; **B**	(Brazil) Luiz Razia	Ret	11											10th	5
2009–10	GP2/05; Renault; **B**	(Mexico) Sergio Pérez			12	4	7	17							10th	5
2009–10	GP2/05; Renault; **B**	(Venezuela) Rodolfo González							Ret	Ret					10th	5
2011	GP2/11; Mecachrome; **P**		YMC; FEA	YMC; SPR	IMO; FEA	IMO; SPR									3rd	16
2011	GP2/11; Mecachrome; **P**	(France) Charles Pic	9	21	20	11									3rd	16
2011	GP2/11; Mecachrome; **P**	(Netherlands) Giedo van der Garde	5	23	2	3									3rd	16

=== GP3 Series ===
Year	Car	Drivers	Races	Wins	Poles	Fast laps	Points	D.C.	T.C.
2010	Dallara GP3/10-Renault	(Brazil) Felipe Guimarães	16	0	0	0	9	16th	8th
2010	Dallara GP3/10-Renault	(Mexico) Pablo Sánchez López	16	0	0	0	0	30th	8th
2010	Dallara GP3/10-Renault	(Italy) Mirko Bortolotti	16	0	0	0	16	11th	8th
2011	Dallara GP3/10-Renault	(New Zealand) Dominic Storey	4	0	0	0	0	37th	8th
2011	Dallara GP3/10-Renault	(France) Tom Dillmann	12	0	0	0	15 (Note: Tom Dillmann scored 8 of his 15 points in 2 races for Carlin.)	14th	8th
2011	Dallara GP3/10-Renault	(Colombia) Gabriel Chaves	16	0	0	0	8	19th	8th
2011	Dallara GP3/10-Renault	(United Kingdom) Dean Smith	14	0	0	1	18	12th	8th
2011	Dallara GP3/10-Renault	(Italy) Vittorio Ghirelli	2	0	0	0	0	25th (Note: Vittorio Ghirelli also took part in 12 races for Jenzer Motorsport.)	8th

=== In detail ===
(key) (Races in bold indicate pole position) (Races in italics indicate fastest lap)

Year	Chassis Engine Tyres	Drivers	1	2	3	4	5	6	7	8	9	10	11	12	13	14	15	16	T.C.	Points
2010	GP3/10; Renault; **P**		CAT; FEA	CAT; SPR	IST; FEA	IST; SPR	VAL; FEA	VAL; SPR	SIL; FEA	SIL; SPR	HOC; FEA	HOC; SPR	HUN; FEA	HUN; SPR	SPA; FEA	SPA; SPR	MNZ; FEA	MNZ; SPR	8th	25
2010	GP3/10; Renault; **P**	(Brazil) Felipe Guimarães	Ret	20	3	6	Ret	18	Ret	23	7	7	13	Ret	Ret	9	Ret	17	8th	25
2010	GP3/10; Renault; **P**	(Mexico) Pablo Sánchez López	Ret	15	21	16	14	9	21	14	Ret	11	Ret	16	Ret	25	18	12	8th	25
2010	GP3/10; Renault; **P**	(Italy) Mirko Bortolotti	16	Ret	25^{†}	12	18	10	8	13	6	4	11	8	Ret	14	5	2	8th	25
2011	GP3/10; Renault; **P**		IST; FEA	IST; SPR	CAT; FEA	CAT; SPR	VAL; FEA	VAL; SPR	SIL; FEA	SIL; SPR	NÜR; FEA	NÜR; SPR	HUN; FEA	HUN; SPR	SPA; FEA	SPA; SPR	MNZ; FEA	MNZ; SPR	8th	33
2011	GP3/10; Renault; **P**	(New Zealand) Dominic Storey	20	Ret	Ret	27^{†}													8th	33
2011	GP3/10; Renault; **P**	(France) Tom Dillmann					20	Ret	Ret	25^{†}	22	5	7	22	6	Ret	Ret	9	8th	33
2011	GP3/10; Renault; **P**	(Colombia) Gabriel Chaves	10	12	13	6	4	5	Ret	14	27^{†}	17	23	Ret	16	16	17	7	8th	33
2011	GP3/10; Renault; **P**	(United Kingdom) Dean Smith	9	6	7	3	5	11	8	2	24	Ret	24	19	20	20			8th	33
2011	GP3/10; Renault; **P**	(Italy) Vittorio Ghirelli															Ret	18	8th	33

== Notes ==
Achievements
Preceded by Rapax	GP2 Series Teams' Champion; 2011	Succeeded by DAMS
