= Julián Leal =

Colombian businessman and former racing driver (born 1990)

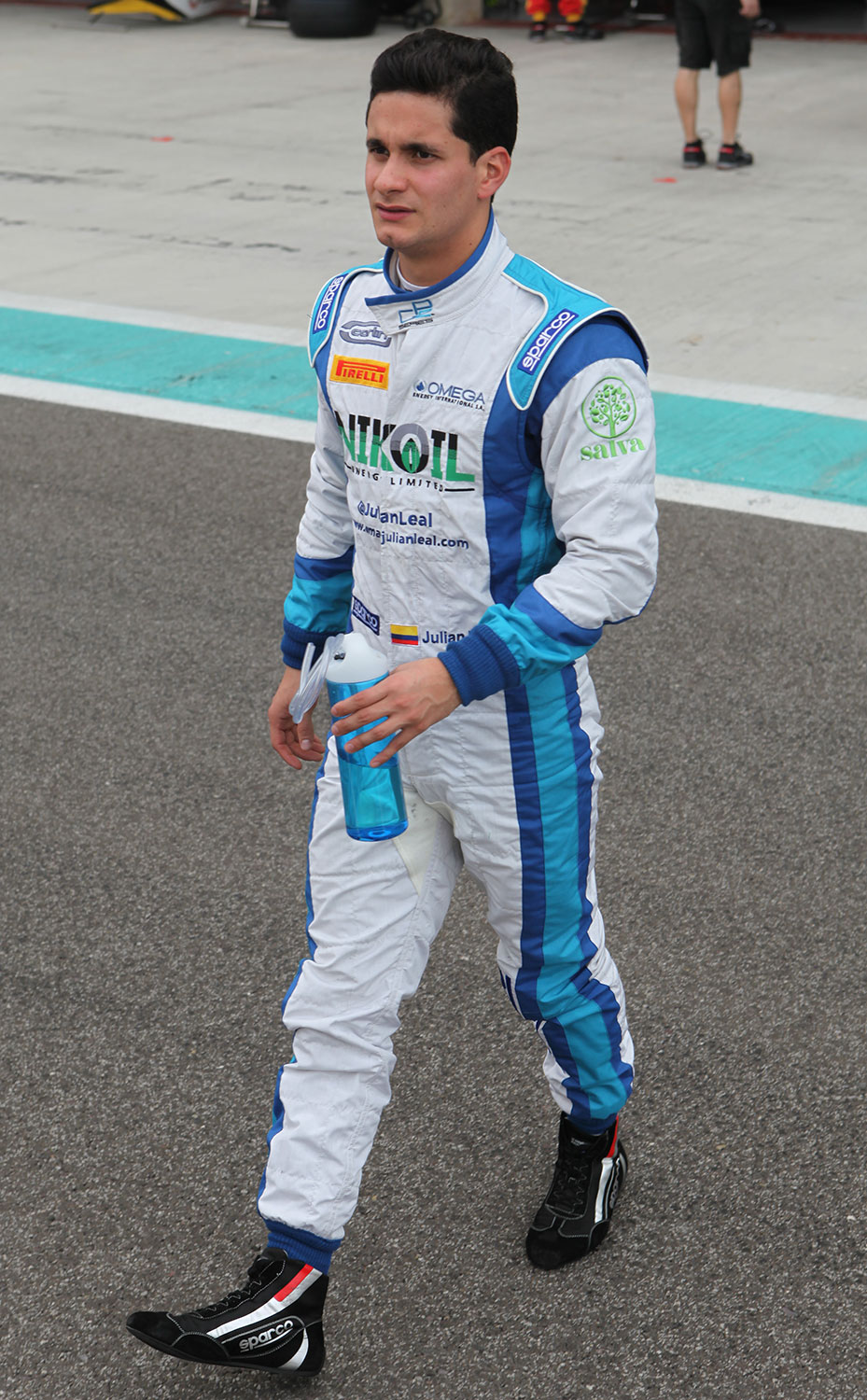
- Leal in 2014
- Nationality: (Colombia) Colombian
- Born: Ómar Julián Leal Covelli; 11 May 1990 (age 36) Bucaramanga, Colombia

GP2 Series career
- Debut season: 2011
- Current team: Carlin
- Categorisation: FIA Silver
- Car number: 4
- Former teams: Racing Engineering; Trident Racing; Rapax
- Starts: 102
- Wins: 0
- Poles: 0
- Fastest laps: 1
- Best finish: 10th in 2014

Previous series
- 2011 2009–2010 2007–08 2007–08 2006–07: GP2 Asia Series; Formula Renault 3.5 Series; Italian Formula 3000; Euroseries 3000; FR2.0 PanamGP

Championship titles
- 2008: Italian Formula 3000

Ómar Julián Leal Covelli (born 11 May 1990 in Bucaramanga) is a Colombian businessman and former professional racing driver. He has also competed with an Italian licence in the GP2 Series.

== Career ==
=== Formula Renault 2.0 ===
Leal began his racing career in 2006 in the Formula Renault 2.0 PanamGP series, scoring two podium finishes in seven races to finish ninth in the standings. He also took part in two races of the series the following year.

=== Euroseries 3000 ===
The following season, Leal moved to Europe to compete in the Euroseries 3000 championship. Driving for the Italian Durango team, he finished ninth in the Euroseries standings and eleventh in the Italian Formula 3000 championship, which ran as part of the main series.

Leal continued in the championship in 2008, finishing sixth in the Euroseries after securing four podium places in fifteen races. In September of that year, he won the Italian Formula 3000 championship at Misano, beating both Fabio Onidi and Nicolas Prost to the title by a single point.

=== Formula Renault 3.5 Series ===
At the end of 2008, Leal took part in Formula Renault 3.5 Series testing at Paul Ricard and Valencia, driving for both Draco Racing and Prema Powerteam. In December 2008, it was announced that Leal had signed with Prema Powerteam for the 2009 season. He had a testing first season in the category, with a podium at the Hungaroring being his only points–scoring finish, as he wound up 20th in the standings.

In the off–season, Leal tested for both Prema and Mofaz Racing at the Circuit de Catalunya and in December 2009, it was announced that he would drive for Draco Racing in the 2010 season, partnering Formula Renault graduate Nathanaël Berthon. He again finished the season in 20th position after struggling to match his rookie team–mate, with his best race result being a fourth place at the first race in Brno.

=== Auto GP ===
In March 2010, it was announced that Leal would also compete in the new Auto GP championship, competing for the Italian team Trident Racing. He finished seventh in the final standings, with the highlight of his season coming at the penultimate round at the brand–new Circuito de Navarra, where he won the first race after starting from pole position.

=== GP2 Series ===
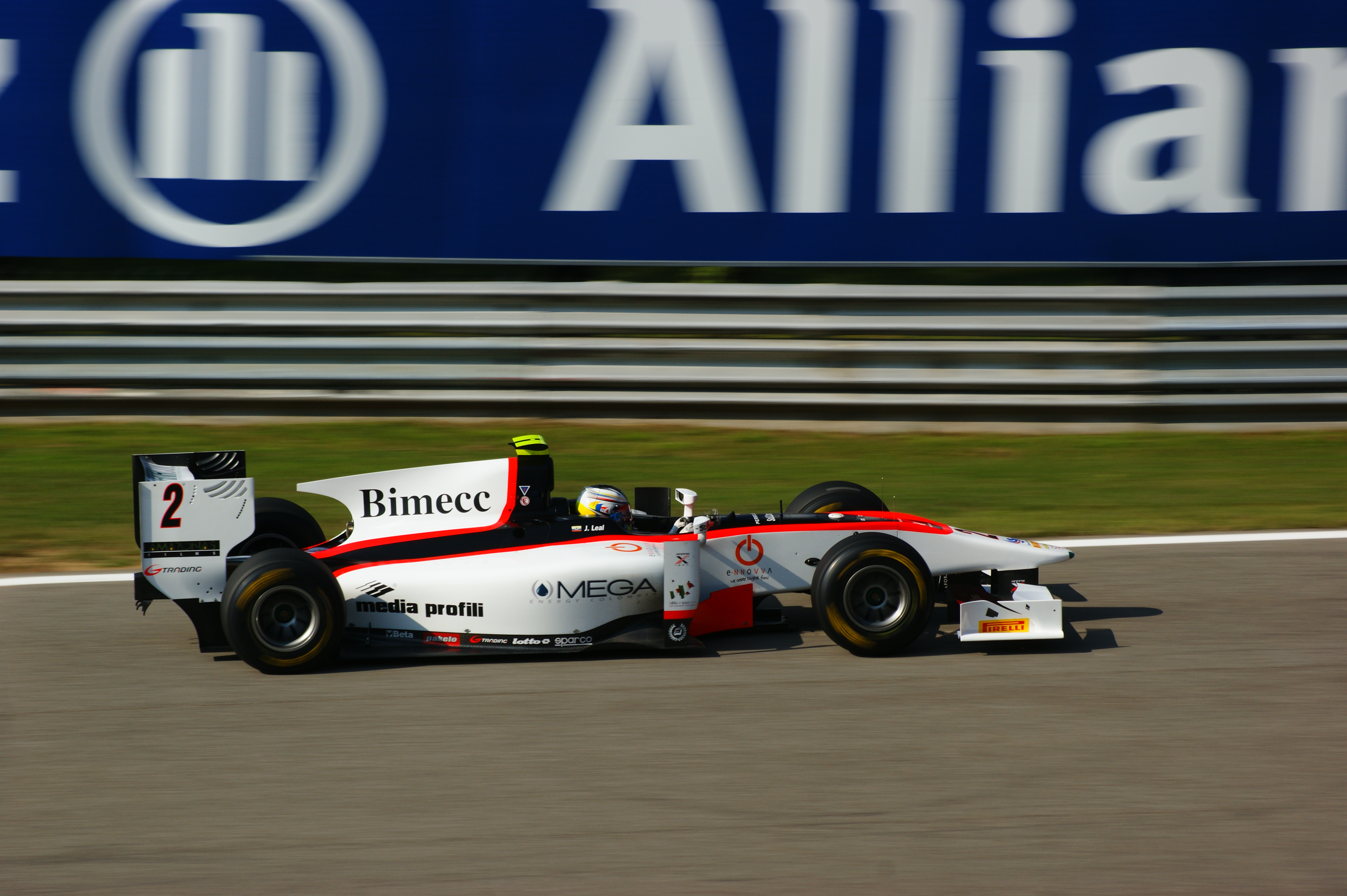
Leal driving for Rapax at the Monza round of the 2011 GP2 Series season.

In November 2010, Leal tested a GP2 Series car for the first time, taking part in the post–season test at the Yas Marina Circuit in Abu Dhabi, and in January 2011 it was announced that he had signed with the Rapax Team to contest the GP2 Asia Series season, lining–up alongside Fabio Leimer. He had initially signed to contest only the Asia series, but in March 2011 it was confirmed that he would stay with the team for the main 2011 championship, in which he finished 27th.

Leal switched to the Trident Racing team for the non-championship season finale at Yas Marina, and remained with the outfit for the 2012 season, where he was partnered with Stéphane Richelmi. He scored his first series points and finished 21st in the championship.

Leal moved to Racing Engineering for the 2013 season, his teammate for the second time was champion of that year Fabio Leimer. He scored a total of 62 points, including two sprint race podiums leaving him 12th in the championship. For 2014, he moved to British squad Carlin alongside Felipe Nasr. He finished on the podium in both races at the first round but ultimately would finish 10th in the final standings on 68 points.

Leal continued with Carlin for 2015.

== Post-racing career ==
Leal retired from racing in 2016. Following his retirement from racing Leal started Leal Race Cars in 2021.

== Racing record ==
=== Career summary ===
Season	Series	Team	Races	Wins	Poles	F/Laps	Podiums	Points	Position
2006	Formula Renault 2.0 PanamGP	Penix Unico	7	0	0	0	2	72	9th
2007	Formula Renault 2.0 PanamGP	?	2	0	0	0	0	16	17th
2007	Euroseries 3000	Durango	16	0	0	0	0	13	9th
2007	Italian Formula 3000	Durango	8	0	0	0	0	8	11th
2008	Euroseries 3000	Durango	15	0	1	0	4	38	6th
2008	Italian Formula 3000	Durango	8	0	1	0	4	35	**1st**
2009	Formula Renault 3.5 Series	Prema Powerteam	17	0	0	0	1	11	20th
2010	Formula Renault 3.5 Series	International DracoRacing	17	0	0	0	0	11	20th
2010	Auto GP	Trident Racing	12	1	1	1	1	21	9th
2011	GP2 Series	Rapax	18	0	0	0	0	0	27th
2011	GP2 Asia Series	Rapax	4	0	0	0	0	0	26th
2011	GP2 Final	Trident Racing	2	0	0	0	0	0	22nd
2012	GP2 Series	Trident Racing	24	0	0	0	0	9	21st
2013	GP2 Series	Racing Engineering	22	0	0	0	2	62	12th
2014	GP2 Series	Carlin	22	0	0	1	2	68	10th
2014	Formula One	Caterham F1 Team	Test driver						
2015	GP2 Series	Carlin	16	0	0	0	0	38	14th
2016	European Le Mans Series - LMP2	SMP Racing	4	0	0	0	2	60	6th

=== Complete Euroseries 3000/Auto GP results ===
(key) (Races in bold indicate pole position; races in italics indicate fastest lap)

Year	Entrant	1	2	3	4	5	6	7	8	9	10	11	12	13	14	15	16	DC	Points
2007	Durango	VAL; FEA; 10	VAL; SPR; 10	HUN; FEA; 10	HUN; SPR; 9	MAG; FEA; 8	MAG; SPR; 10	MUG; FEA; 11	MUG; SPR; 6	NÜR; FEA; Ret	NÜR; SPR; 7	SPA; FEA; 7	SPA; SPR; Ret	MNZ; FEA; 5	MNZ; SPR; 4	CAT; FEA; 7	CAT; SPR; 6	10th	14
2008	Durango	VAL; FEA; 5	VAL; SPR; 6	SPA; FEA; 9	SPA; SPR; C	VAL; FEA; 5	VAL; SPR; 2	MUG; FEA; 4	MUG; SPR; 3	**MIS**; **FEA**; 3	MIS; SPR; 2	JER; FEA; Ret	JER; SPR; 7	CAT; FEA; Ret	CAT; SPR; 4	MAG; FEA; Ret	MAG; SPR; 9	6th	38
2010	Trident Racing	BRN; 1; 10	BRN; 2; 4	IMO; 1 Ret	IMO; 2; 8	SPA; 1; 7	SPA; 2 Ret	MAG; 1; 9	MAG; 2; 7	**NAV**; **1**; 1	NAV; 2 Ret	MNZ; 1; 8	MNZ; 2; 4					9th	21

=== Complete Formula Renault 3.5 Series results ===
(key) (Races in bold indicate pole position) (Races in italics indicate fastest lap)

Year	Team	1	2	3	4	5	6	7	8	9	10	11	12	13	14	15	16	17	Pos	Points
2009	Prema Powerteam	CAT; 1; 15	CAT; 2; 19†	SPA; 1; 19	SPA; 2; 18	MON; 1; 14	HUN; 1; 22	HUN; 2; 3	SIL; 1; 17	SIL; 2; 16	BUG; 1 Ret	BUG; 2; 20	ALG; 1; 18	ALG; 2; 17	NÜR; 1; 17	NÜR; 2; 14	ALC; 1; 21	ALC; 2; 22†	20th	11
2010	International Draco Racing	ALC; 1 Ret	ALC; 2 Ret	SPA; 1; 11	SPA; 2; 12	MON; 1; 16	BRN; 1; 4	BRN; 2; 13	MAG; 1 Ret	MAG; 2; 19	HUN; 1 Ret	HUN; 2; 16	HOC; 1; 13	HOC; 2; 9	SIL; 1 Ret	SIL; 2; 10	CAT; 1 Ret	CAT; 2 Ret	20th	11

† Driver did not finish the race, but was classified as he completed over 90% of the race distance.

=== Complete GP2 Series results ===
(key) (Races in bold indicate pole position) (Races in italics indicate fastest lap)

Year	Entrant	1	2	3	4	5	6	7	8	9	10	11	12	13	14	15	16	17	18	19	20	21	22	23	24	DC	Points
2011	Rapax	IST; FEA; 19	IST; SPR; Ret	CAT; FEA; 17	CAT; SPR; 14	MON; FEA; Ret	MON; SPR; Ret	VAL; FEA; 11	VAL; SPR; 9	SIL; FEA; 22	SIL; SPR; 21	NÜR; FEA; 14	NÜR; SPR; 9	HUN; FEA; 20	HUN; SPR; Ret	SPA; FEA; Ret	SPA; SPR; Ret	MNZ; FEA; 16	MNZ; SPR; Ret							27th	0
2012	Trident Racing	SEP; FEA; 15	SEP; SPR; 15	BHR1; FEA; 12	BHR1; SPR; 17	BHR2; FEA; 15	BHR2; SPR; 14	CAT; FEA; 24	CAT; SPR; 17	MON; FEA; 21	MON; SPR; Ret	VAL; FEA; 12	VAL; SPR; 8	SIL; FEA; 20	SIL; SPR; 17	HOC; FEA; 21	HOC; SPR; 12	HUN; FEA; 16	HUN; SPR; 15	SPA; FEA; 7	SPA; SPR; 9	MNZ; FEA; 10	MNZ; SPR; 8	MRN; FEA; 11	MRN; SPR; 16	21st	9
2013	Racing Engineering	SEP; FEA; 5	SEP; SPR; Ret	BHR; FEA; 19	BHR; SPR; 16	CAT; FEA; 13	CAT; SPR; 25†	MON; FEA; Ret	MON; SPR; 14	SIL; FEA; 8	SIL; SPR; 4	NÜR; FEA; 22	NÜR; SPR; 12	HUN; FEA; 15	HUN; SPR; 21	SPA; FEA; 6	SPA; SPR; 2	MNZ; FEA; 5	MNZ; SPR; 3	MRN; FEA; Ret	MRN; SPR; 12	YMC; FEA; 16	YMC; SPR; 10			12th	62
2014	Carlin	BHR; FEA; 2	BHR; SPR; 3	CAT; FEA; 4	CAT; SPR; 5	MON; FEA; Ret	MON; SPR; 16	RBR; FEA; 13	RBR; SPR; 7	SIL; FEA; 5	SIL; SPR; 5	HOC; FEA; 16	HOC; SPR; 18	HUN; FEA; Ret	HUN; SPR; 15	SPA; FEA; 13	SPA; SPR; 10	MNZ; FEA; 14	MNZ; SPR; 17	SOC; FEA; 9	SOC; SPR; 17	YMC; FEA; 12	YMC; SPR; 11			10th	68
2015	Carlin	BHR; FEA; 8	BHR; SPR; 5	CAT; FEA; Ret	CAT; SPR; 16	MON; FEA; 6	MON; SPR; 5	RBR; FEA; 14	RBR; SPR; 22	SIL; FEA; 9	SIL; SPR; 12	HUN; FEA; 16	HUN; SPR; 15	SPA; FEA; 4	SPA; SPR; 11	MNZ; FEA; 12	MNZ; SPR; 9	SOC; FEA	SOC; SPR	BHR; FEA	BHR; SPR	YMC; FEA	YMC; SPR			14th	38

==== Complete GP2 Asia Series results ====
(key) (Races in bold indicate pole position) (Races in italics indicate fastest lap)

Year	Entrant	1	2	3	4	DC	Points
2011	Rapax	YMC; FEA; Ret	YMC; SPR; 17	IMO; FEA; 17	IMO; SPR; 18	26th	0

==== Complete GP2 Final results ====
(key) (Races in bold indicate pole position) (Races in italics indicate fastest lap)

Year	Entrant	1	2	DC	Points
2011	Trident Racing	YMC; FEA; 16	YMC; SPR; 21	22nd	0

=== Complete European Le Mans Series results ===
Year	Entrant	Class	Chassis	Engine	1	2	3	4	5	6	Rank	Points
2016	SMP Racing	LMP2	BR Engineering BR01	Nissan VK45DE 4.5 L V8	SIL; 2	IMO; 4	RBR; 4	LEC; 2	SPA	EST	6th	60

Sporting positions
Preceded by Davide Rigon	Italian F3000 champion 2008	Succeeded by Will Bratt
