= Pål Varhaug =

Norwegian racing driver (born 1991)

- Nationality: (Norway) Norwegian
- Born: 26 January 1991 (age 35) Stavanger, Norway

GP3 Series career
- Current team: Jenzer Motorsport
- Car number: 20
- Starts: 52
- Wins: 1
- Poles: 0
- Fastest laps: 0
- Best finish: 13th in 2010

Previous series
- 2007 2007 2007–2008 2008 2009 2011 2011–13 2012, 14: Formula Renault 2.0 NEC; Swiss Formula Renault 2.0; Italian Formula Renault 2.0; Eurocup Formula Renault 2.0; International Formula Master; GP2 Asia Series; GP2 Series; Auto GP

Championship titles
- 2008: Italian Formula Renault 2.0

Pål Varhaug (born 26 January 1991 in Stavanger) is a Norwegian former racing driver.

== Career ==
=== Karting ===
Varhaug began his motorsport career in karting in 2005, finishing fifth in the Norwegian Championship ICA Junior category. He also finished fourth in the Viking Trophy ICA Junior class. The following year, he won the Norwegian Championship ICA Junior title.

=== Formula Renault 2.0 ===
Varhaug moved up to single–seaters in 2007, competing in the Swiss Formula Renault 2.0 championship for Jenzer Motorsport. Over the course of the season, he took seven podium places, including four race wins, to finish as runner-up in the championship. He also took part in selected races in both the Italian Formula Renault 2.0 and Formula Renault 2.0 NEC championships.

Varhaug continued with Jenzer Motorsport in the category for 2008, racing full seasons in both the Eurocup Formula Renault 2.0 and Italian Formula Renault 2.0 series. He finished fifteenth in the Eurocup standings, with his best race result being a fifth place in the second event at Estoril. In the Italian series, he finished in the points in all fourteen races and took three races wins to comfortably win the title.

At the end of the season, Varhaug took part in Formula Renault 3.5 Series testing at Paul Ricard with the Italian Prema Powerteam, completing over one hundred laps in the process.

=== International Formula Master ===
For 2009, Varhaug moved up to the International Formula Master series, once again staying with Jenzer Motorsport. He finished in fifth place in the standings, and was the runner–up in the rookie classification behind Alexander Rossi. He achieved five podium places and a pole position at Brno.

=== GP3 Series ===
Varhaug graduated to the new GP3 Series with Jenzer Motorsport in 2010. After qualifying on the front row of the grid for the opening race of the season in Barcelona, Varhaug became the first–ever GP3 race winner, finishing ahead of both Robert Wickens and Esteban Gutiérrez. He failed to score another point after his win and eventually finished 13th in the standings.

Varhaug originally finished in third place in the feature race at Spa–Francorchamps, but was later demoted to 15th after overtaking the safety car. He also posted the fastest lap in the final race of the season in Monza, but was not rewarded with a championship point because he failed to finish inside the race's top ten positions.

Varhaug returned to the series in 2014, again with Jenzer. He finished seventeenth in the standings overall.

=== GP2 Series ===
Varhaug graduated to the GP2 Series for 2011, driving alongside Romain Grosjean in the DAMS team. He finished thirteenth in the Asia series, which along his team-mate's overall victory, allowed DAMS to win the teams' championship. Whilst Grosjean also won the main series championship, Varhaug did not score any points and was classified 23rd overall.

=== Auto GP World Series ===
After losing his GP2 drive at DAMS, Varhaug moved to the Auto GP World Series with the Virtuosi UK team.

== Racing record ==
=== Career summary ===
Season	Series	Team	Races	Wins	Poles	F/Laps	Podiums	Points	Position
2007	Swiss Formula Renault 2.0	Jenzer Motorsport	12	4	3	1	7	232	**2nd**
2007	Italian Formula Renault 2.0	Jenzer Motorsport	2	0	0	0	0	0	49th
2007	Formula Renault 2.0 NEC	Jenzer Motorsport	2	0	0	0	0	16	39th
2008	Eurocup Formula Renault 2.0	Jenzer Motorsport	14	0	0	0	0	17	14th
2008	Italian Formula Renault 2.0	Jenzer Motorsport	12	3	3	1	6	330	**1st**
2009	International Formula Master	Jenzer Motorsport	16	0	1	0	5	49	5th
2010	GP3 Series	Jenzer Motorsport	16	1	0	0	1	10	13th
2011	GP2 Series	DAMS	18	0	0	0	0	0	23rd
2011	GP2 Asia Series	DAMS	4	0	0	0	0	1	13th
2012	Auto GP World Series	Virtuosi UK	14	3	0	1	8	183	**2nd**
2013	GP2 Series	Hilmer Motorsport	4	0	0	0	0	0	31st
2014	GP3 Series	Jenzer Motorsport	18	0	0	0	0	12	17th
2014	Auto GP	Virtuosi UK	2	0	0	0	1	24	15th
2015	GP3 Series	Jenzer Motorsport	18	0	0	0	0	5	19th

=== Complete Formula Renault 2.0 NEC results ===
(key) (Races in bold indicate pole position) (Races in italics indicate fastest lap)

Year	Entrant	1	2	3	4	5	6	7	8	9	10	11	12	13	14	15	16	DC	Points
2007	Jenzer Motorsport	ZAN; 1	ZAN; 2	OSC; 1	OSC; 2	ASS; 1	ASS; 2	ZOL; 1	ZOL; 1	NUR; 1	NUR; 2	OSC; 1	OSC; 2	SPA; 1; 13	SPA; 2; 13	HOC; 1	HOC; 2	39th	16

=== Complete Eurocup Formula Renault 2.0 results ===
(key) (Races in bold indicate pole position; races in italics indicate fastest lap)

Year	Entrant	1	2	3	4	5	6	7	8	9	10	11	12	13	14	DC	Points
2008	Jenzer Motorsport	SPA; 1; 14	SPA; 2; 7	SIL; 1; 13	SIL; 2; 12	HUN; 1; 8	HUN; 2; 12	NÜR; 1; 28	NÜR; 2; 20	LMS; 1; 14	LMS; 2; 20	EST; 1; 12	EST; 2; 5	CAT; 1; 13	CAT; 2; 7	15th	17

=== Complete GP3 Series results ===
(key) (Races in bold indicate pole position) (Races in italics indicate fastest lap)

Year	Entrant	1	2	3	4	5	6	7	8	9	10	11	12	13	14	15	16	17	18	DC	Points
2010	Jenzer Motorsport	CAT; FEA; 1	CAT; SPR; Ret	IST; FEA; 15	IST; SPR; 18	VAL; FEA; 11	VAL; SPR; 8	SIL; FEA; 14	SIL; SPR; 9	HOC; FEA; 12	HOC; SPR; Ret	HUN; FEA; 17	HUN; SPR; 23	SPA; FEA; 15	SPA; SPR; 17	MNZ; FEA; 14	MNZ; SPR; 19			13th	10
2014	Jenzer Motorsport	CAT; FEA; 12	CAT; SPR; Ret	RBR; FEA; 13	RBR; SPR; 9	SIL; FEA; 11	SIL; SPR; Ret	HOC; FEA; 19	HOC; SPR; Ret	HUN; FEA; 21	HUN; SPR; 14	SPA; FEA; 5	SPA; SPR; 8	MNZ; FEA; Ret	MNZ; SPR; 11	SOC; FEA; 10	SOC; SPR; Ret	YMC; FEA; 14	YMC; SPR; 9	17th	12
2015	Jenzer Motorsport	CAT; FEA; 21	CAT; SPR; 18	RBR; FEA; 11	RBR; SPR; Ret	SIL; FEA; 16	SIL; SPR; 19	HUN; FEA; 9	HUN; SPR; 7	SPA; FEA; Ret	SPA; SPR; 10	MNZ; FEA; Ret	MNZ; SPR; 14	SOC; FEA; Ret	SOC; SPR; 14	BHR; FEA; Ret	BHR; SPR; Ret	YMC; FEA; 11	YMC; SPR; 8	19th	5

=== Complete GP2 Series results ===
(key) (Races in bold indicate pole position) (Races in italics indicate fastest lap)

Year	Entrant	1	2	3	4	5	6	7	8	9	10	11	12	13	14	15	16	17	18	19	20	21	22	DC	Points
2011	DAMS	IST; FEA; 18	IST; SPR; 21	CAT; FEA; 15	CAT; SPR; 8	MON; FEA; Ret	MON; SPR; 21	VAL; FEA; 13	VAL; SPR; 10	SIL; FEA; 16	SIL; SPR; 23	NÜR; FEA; Ret	NÜR; SPR; 17	HUN; FEA; 13	HUN; SPR; Ret	SPA; FEA; 13	SPA; SPR; 18	MNZ; FEA; 11	MNZ; SPR; 10					23rd	0
2013	Hilmer Motorsport	SEP; FEA; 15	SEP; SPR; 19	BHR; FEA; Ret	BHR; SPR; 21	CAT; FEA	CAT; SPR	MON; FEA	MON; SPR	SIL; FEA	SIL; SPR	HOC; FEA	HOC; SPR	HUN; FEA	HUN; SPR	SPA; FEA	SPA; SPR	MNZ; FEA	MNZ; SPR	MRN; FEA	MRN; SPR	YMC; FEA	YMC; SPR	31st	0

==== Complete GP2 Asia Series results ====
(key) (Races in bold indicate pole position) (Races in italics indicate fastest lap)

Year	Entrant	1	2	3	4	DC	Points
2011	DAMS	YMC; FEA; Ret	YMC; SPR; 20	IMO; FEA; 14	IMO; SPR; 6	13th	1

=== Complete Auto GP World Series results ===
(key) (Races in bold indicate pole position) (Races in italics indicate fastest lap)

Year	Entrant	1	2	3	4	5	6	7	8	9	10	11	12	13	14	15	16	Pos	Points
2012	Virtuosi UK	MNZ; 1; 2	MNZ; 2; 1	VAL; 1; 3	VAL; 2; 8	MAR; 1; 3	MAR; 2; 7	HUN; 1; 5	HUN; 2; 1	ALG; 1; 2	ALG; 2 Ret	CUR; 1; 2	CUR; 2; 5	SON; 1; 1	SON; 2; 5			**2nd**	**183**
2014	Virtuosi UK	MAR; 1	MAR; 2	LEC; 1	LEC; 2	HUN; 1	HUN; 2	MNZ; 1	MNZ; 2	IMO; 1; 4	IMO; 2; 3	RBR; 1	RBR; 2	NÜR; 1	NÜR; 2	EST; 1	EST; 2	15th	24

Sporting positions
Preceded by Mika Mäki	Italian Formula Renault 2.0; Champion; 2008	Succeeded by Daniel Mancinelli
