= 2015 Spa-Francorchamps GP2 Series round =

(Belgium) 2015 Spa-Francorchamps GP2 round
Round details
- Round 7 of 11 rounds in the 2015 GP2 Series
- Layout of the Circuit de Spa-Francorchamps
- Location: Circuit de Spa-Francorchamps, Francorchamps, Wallonia, Belgium
- Course: Permanent racing facility 7.004 km (4.352 mi)

GP2 Series

Feature race
- Date: 22 August 2015
- Laps: 25

Pole position
Driver	(Belgium) Stoffel Vandoorne	ART Grand Prix
- Time: 1:56.278

Podium
First	(Belgium) Stoffel Vandoorne	ART Grand Prix
Second	(France) Arthur Pic	Campos Racing
Third	(Russia) Artem Markelov	Russian Time

Fastest lap
Driver	(New Zealand) Richie Stanaway	Status Grand Prix
- Time: 2:00.177 (on lap 20)

Sprint race
- Date: 23 August 2015
- Laps: 18

Podium
First	(United States) Alexander Rossi	Racing Engineering
Second	(United Kingdom) Jordan King	Racing Engineering
Third	(New Zealand) Mitch Evans	Russian Time

Fastest lap
Driver	(Belgium) Stoffel Vandoorne	ART Grand Prix
- Time: 2:01.151 (on lap 3)

The 2015 Spa-Francorchamps GP2 Series round was a GP2 Series motor race held on August 22 and 23, 2015 at Circuit de Spa-Francorchamps, Belgium. It was the seventh round of the 2015 GP2 Series. The race supported the 2015 Belgian Grand Prix.

== Classification ==
=== Qualifying ===
Pos.	No.	Driver	Team	Time	Gap	Grid
1	5	(Belgium) Stoffel Vandoorne	ART Grand Prix	1:56.278		1
2	16	(United Kingdom) Oliver Rowland	MP Motorsport	1:56.425	+0.147	2
3	18	(Russia) Sergey Sirotkin	Rapax	1:56.513	+0.235	3
4	7	(United Kingdom) Jordan King	Racing Engineering	1:56.625	+0.347	4
5	6	(Japan) Nobuharu Matsushita	ART Grand Prix	1:56.659	+0.381	5
6	9	(New Zealand) Mitch Evans	Russian Time	1:56.661	+0.383	6
7	1	(France) Pierre Gasly	DAMS	1:56.701	+0.423	7
8	8	(United States) Alexander Rossi	Racing Engineering	1:56.845	+0.567	8
9	2	(United Kingdom) Alex Lynn	DAMS	1:56.985	+0.707	9
10	21	(France) Norman Nato	Arden International	1:57.019	+0.741	10
11	15	(Indonesia) Rio Haryanto	Campos Racing	1:57.143	+0.865	11
12	11	(Italy) Raffaele Marciello	Trident	1:57.218	+0.940	12
13	19	(Romania) Robert Vișoiu	Rapax	1:57.273	+0.995	13
14	14	(France) Arthur Pic	Campos Racing	1:57.275	+0.997	14
15	24	(United Kingdom) Nick Yelloly	Hilmer Motorsport	1:57.328	+1.050	15
16	3	(Colombia) Julián Leal	Carlin	1:57.440	+1.162	16
17	23	(New Zealand) Richie Stanaway	Status Grand Prix	1:57.528	+1.250	17
18	27	(Spain) Sergio Canamasas	Daiko Team Lazarus	1:57.560	+1.282	18
19	26	(France) Nathanaël Berthon	Daiko Team Lazarus	1:57.615	+1.337	19
20	20	(Brazil) André Negrão	Arden International	1:57.661	+1.383	20
21	17	(Netherlands) Daniël de Jong	MP Motorsport	1:57.746	+1.468	21
22	10	(Russia) Artem Markelov	Russian Time	1:57.809	+1.531	22
23	22	(Philippines) Marlon Stöckinger	Status Grand Prix	1:58.136	+1.858	23
24	12	(Sweden) Gustav Malja	Trident	1:58.371	+2.093	24
25	4	(Indonesia) Sean Gelael	Carlin	1:58.402	+2.124	25

== Feature race ==
The feature race at Spa was marred by a horrific crash involving Daniel de Jong, whose attempted pass Red Bull Junior driver Pierre Gasly at Blanchimont. The Frenchman cut de Jong's line causing them to make contact and de Jong losing his front wing. de Jong went to the tyre barrier at high speed which left him requiring four hours of surgery on his sixth vertebra, per Sky Sports' William Esler.

Pos.	No.	Driver	Team	Laps	Time/Retired	Grid	Points
1	5	(Belgium) Stoffel Vandoorne	ART Grand Prix	25	1:22.18.099	1	25+4
2	14	(France) Arthur Pic	Campos Racing	25	+9.979	14	18
3	10	(Russia) Artem Markelov	Russian Time	25	+12.856	22	15
4	3	(Colombia) Julián Leal	Carlin	25	+13.106	16	12
5	9	(New Zealand) Mitch Evans	Russian Time	25	+12.264	6	10+2
6	8	(United States) Alexander Rossi	Racing Engineering	25	+19.527	8	8
7	26	(France) Nathanaël Berthon	Daiko Team Lazarus	25	+23.723	19	6
8	7	(United Kingdom) Jordan King	Racing Engineering	25	+29.267	4	4
9	18	(Russia) Sergey Sirotkin	Rapax	25	+34.144	3	2
10	12	(Sweden) Gustav Malja	Trident	25	+35.169	24	1
11	2	(United Kingdom) Alex Lynn	DAMS	25	+35.610	9	
12	27	(Spain) Sergio Canamasas	Daiko Team Lazarus	25	+35.797	18	
13	15	(Indonesia) Rio Haryanto	Campos Racing	25	+41.571	11	
14	11	(Italy) Raffaele Marciello	Trident	25	+46.546	12	
15	19	(Romania) Robert Vișoiu	Rapax	25	+51.632	13	
16	20	(Brazil) André Negrão	Arden International	25	+1:03.453	20	
17	22	(Philippines) Marlon Stöckinger	Status Grand Prix	25	+1:04.859	23	
18	23	(New Zealand) Richie Stanaway	Status Grand Prix	25	+1:13.894	17	
19	1	(France) Pierre Gasly	DAMS	25	+1:15.857	7	
20	4	(Indonesia) Sean Gelael	Carlin	25	+1:20.840	25	
NC	16	(United Kingdom) Oliver Rowland	MP Motorsport	18	+7 laps	2	
Ret	24	(United Kingdom) Nick Yelloly	Hilmer Motorsport	11	Retired	15	
Ret	6	(Japan) Nobuharu Matsushita	ART Grand Prix	10	Retired	5	
Ret	17	(Netherlands) Daniël de Jong	MP Motorsport	4	Accident	21	
Ret	21	(France) Norman Nato	Arden International	0	Retired	10	

=== Sprint race ===
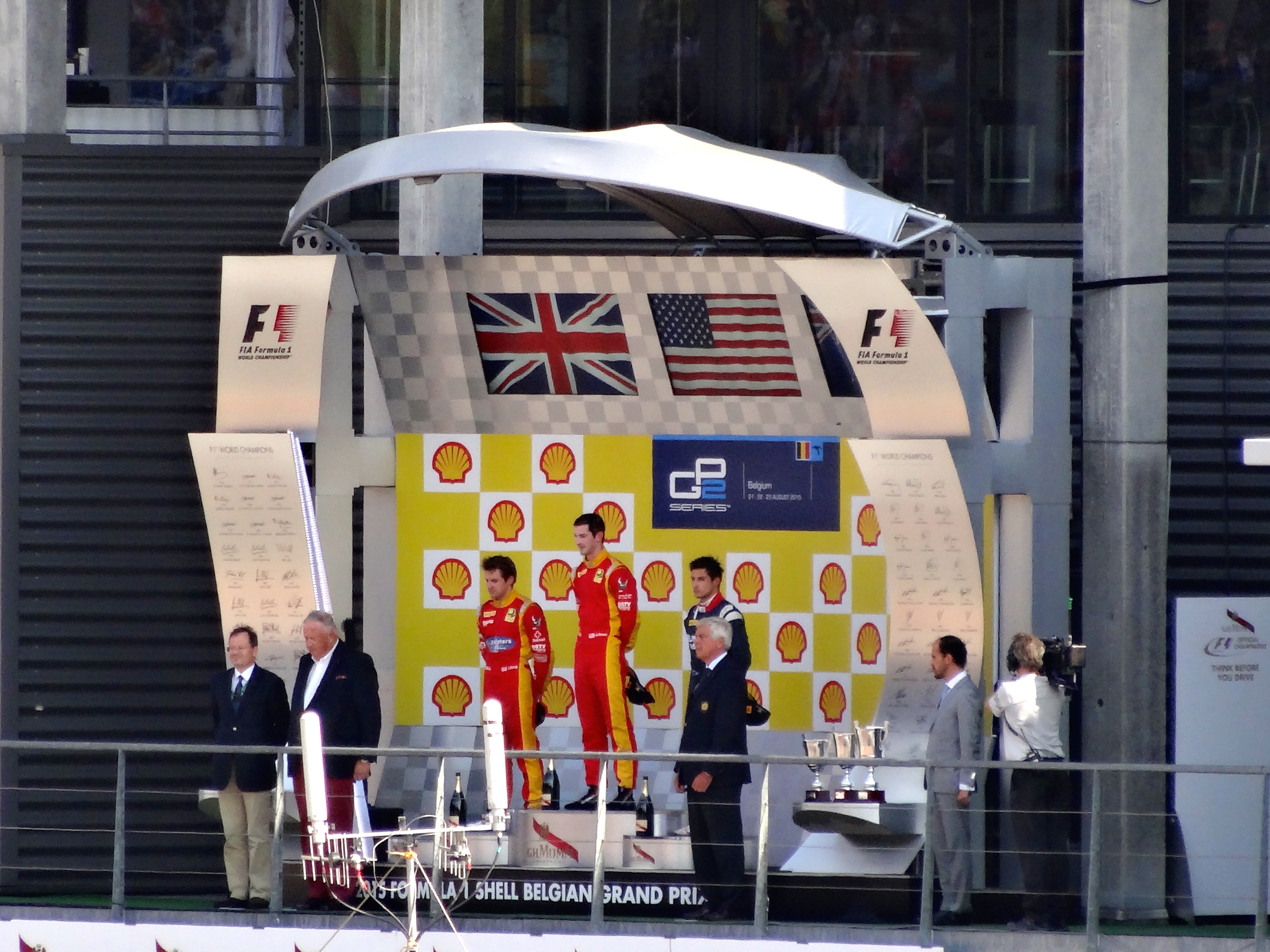
The podium ceremony

Pos.	No.	Driver	Team	Laps	Time/Retired	Grid	Points
1	8	(United States) Alexander Rossi	Racing Engineering	18	38:26.855	3	15
2	7	(United Kingdom) Jordan King	Racing Engineering	18	+1.507	1	12
3	9	(New Zealand) Mitch Evans	Russian Time	18	+3.225	4	10
4	5	(Belgium) Stoffel Vandoorne	ART Grand Prix	18	+4.462	8	8+2
5	10	(Russia) Artem Markelov	Russian Time	18	+11.642	6	6
6	18	(Russia) Sergey Sirotkin	Rapax	18	+13.573	9	4
7	26	(France) Nathanaël Berthon	Daiko Team Lazarus	18	+13.770	2	2
8	2	(United Kingdom) Alex Lynn	DAMS	18	+14.383	11	1
9	27	(Spain) Sergio Canamasas	Daiko Team Lazarus	18	+15.147	12	
10	15	(Indonesia) Rio Haryanto	Campos Racing	18	+18.340	13	
11	3	(Colombia) Julián Leal	Carlin	18	+18.954	5	
12	11	(Italy) Raffaele Marciello	Trident	18	+20.281	14	
13	23	(New Zealand) Richie Stanaway	Status Grand Prix	18	+25.418	18	
14	20	(Brazil) André Negrão	Arden International	18	+25.548	16	
15	6	(Japan) Nobuharu Matsushita	ART Grand Prix	18	+25.864	23	
16	19	(Romania) Robert Vișoiu	Rapax	18	+27.269	15	
17	24	(United Kingdom) Nick Yelloly	Hilmer Motorsport	18	+27.986	22	
18	12	(Sweden) Gustav Malja	Trident	18	+29.040	10	
19	22	(Philippines) Marlon Stöckinger	Status Grand Prix	18	+34.546	17	
20	21	(France) Norman Nato	Arden International	18	+36.590	25	
21	4	(Indonesia) Sean Gelael	Carlin	18	+41.816	20	
Ret	16	(United Kingdom) Oliver Rowland	MP Motorsport	15	Retired	21	
Ret	14	(France) Arthur Pic	Campos Racing	12	Retired	7	
Ret	1	(France) Pierre Gasly	DAMS	8	Retired	19	
DNS	17	(Netherlands) Daniël de Jong	MP Motorsport	0	Did not start/Injured	24	

== See also ==
- 2015 Belgian Grand Prix
- 2015 Spa-Francorchamps GP3 Series round

Previous round: 2015 Hungaroring GP2 Series round	GP2 Series; 2015 season	Next round: 2015 Monza GP2 Series round
Previous round: 2014 Spa-Francorchamps GP2 Series round	GP2 Spa-Francorchamps round	Next round: 2016 Spa-Francorchamps GP2 Series round
