= 2015 Bahrain GP2 Series round =

Motor race

2015 Bahrain GP2 round
Round details
- Round 1 of 11 rounds in the 2015 GP2 Series
- Layout of the Bahrain International Circuit
- Location: Bahrain International Circuit, Sakhir, Bahrain
- Course: Permanent racing facility 5.406 km (3.359 mi)

GP2 Series

Feature race
- Date: 18 April 2015
- Laps: 32

Pole position
Driver	(Belgium) Stoffel Vandoorne	ART Grand Prix
- Time: 1:39.237

Podium
First	(Belgium) Stoffel Vandoorne	ART Grand Prix
Second	(Indonesia) Rio Haryanto	Campos Racing
Third	(United States) Alexander Rossi	Racing Engineering

Fastest lap
Driver	(Belgium) Stoffel Vandoorne	ART Grand Prix
- Time: 1:44.617 (on lap 24)

Sprint race
- Date: 19 April 2015
- Laps: 23

Podium
First	(Indonesia) Rio Haryanto	Campos Racing
Second	(Belgium) Stoffel Vandoorne	ART Grand Prix
Third	(France) Nathanaël Berthon	Lazarus

Fastest lap
Driver	(Italy) Raffaele Marciello (Note: Raffaele Marciello set the fastest lap, but did not finish in the top 10, so was ineligible to be the point-scorer for the fastest lap. Nobuharu Matsushita was the point-scorer instead for setting the fastest lap of those finishing in the top 10.)	Trident
- Time: 1:44.715 (on lap 23)

The 2015 Bahrain GP2 Series round was a pair of one-make single seater motor races held on 18 and 19 April 2015 at the Bahrain International Circuit in Sakhir, Bahrain as part of the GP2 Series. It was the first round of the 2015 GP2 Series and was run in support of the 2015 Bahrain Grand Prix. The first race, a 32-lap feature event, was won by ART Grand Prix driver Stoffel Vandoorne from pole position. Rio Haryanto finished second for the Campos Racing team, and Racing Engineering driver Alexander Rossi took third. Haryanto won the shorter 23-lap sprint race, from Vandoorne in second, and Lazarus driver Nathanaël Berthon in third.

Vandoorne led the first race, which was disrupted on the fourth lap following a collision between Norman Nato, Arthur Pic, Pierre Gasly and Raffaele Marciello. Drivers on the soft-compound tyres made pit stops for medium-compound tyres, while Vandoorne remained the leader for the lap-nine restart. He held it until his pit stop at the end of lap 22, and Rossi took the lead on the following lap. He kept the position until Vandoorne overtook him to win the race. Julián Leal started first in the second race and remained the leader until Haryanto passed him on the eighth lap. Haryanto maintained the lead for the rest of the race to win.

Haryanto's victory in the sprint event was his first in the GP2 Series after 70 races. The results put Vandoorne in the lead in the Drivers' Championship with 43 points, ten in front of Haryanto. Rossi assumed third position, while Berthon's third-place finish in the second event put him in fourth and Jordan King was fifth. ART Grand Prix took the lead of the Teams' Championship by 15 points over Racing Engineering. Campos Racing were two points behind in third position, while Lazarus and Rapax were fourth and fifth, with ten rounds left in the season.

== Background ==
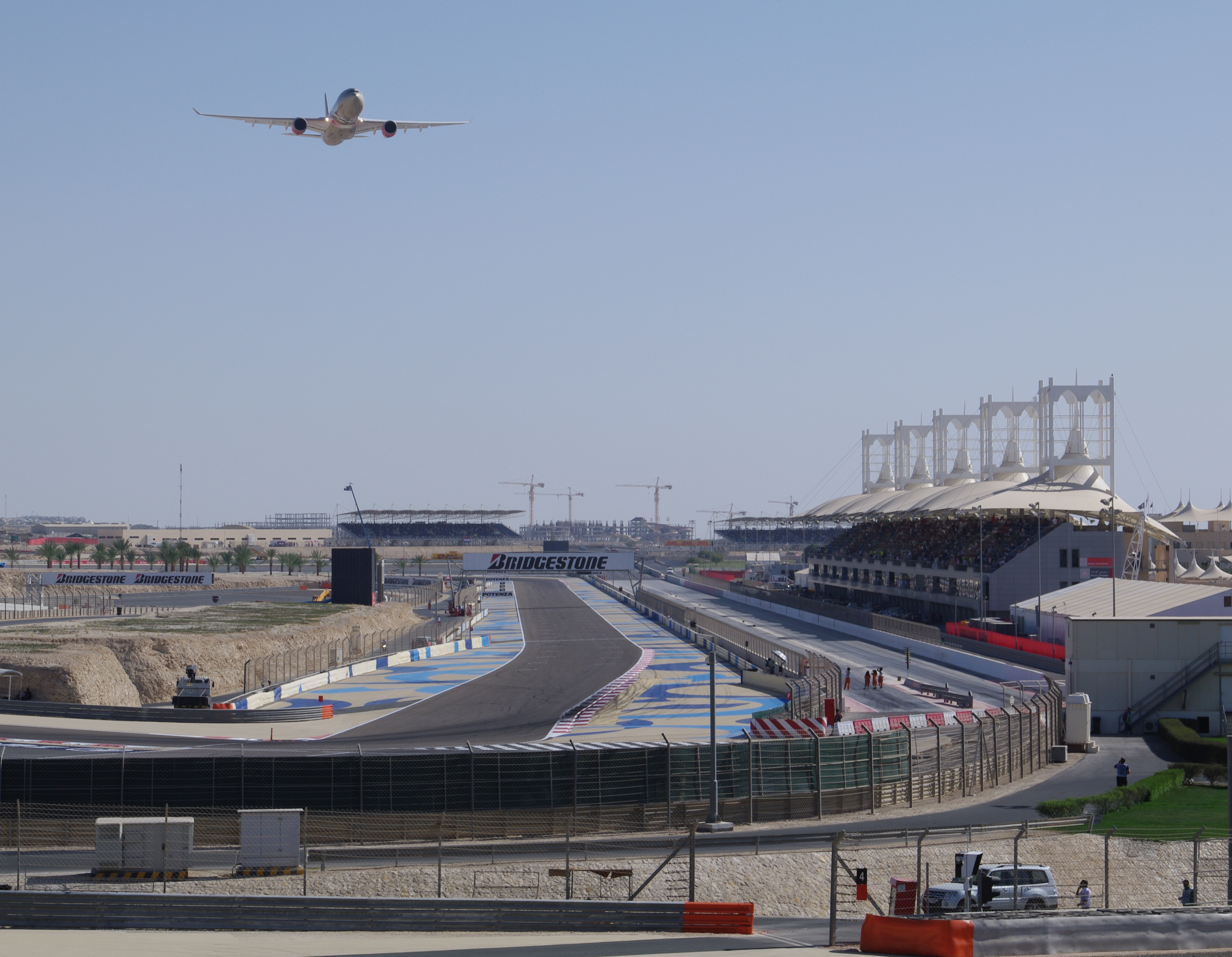
Bahrain International Circuit, where the race was held.

The 2015 Bahrain GP2 Series round was the first of eleven scheduled events in 2015. It was held on 18 and 19 April 2015 at the Bahrain International Circuit in Sakhir, and was run in support of the 2015 Bahrain Grand Prix. The drag reduction system (DRS) had two activation zones for the race: one was on the start/finish straight linking the final and first corners, and the second on the straight from the tenth and eleventh turns. Tyre supplier Pirelli brought two types of tyre to the race: two dry compounds – soft "options" and medium "primes". There were 12 teams fielding two drivers each for a total of 24 participants and every one utilised the Dallara GP2/11 car.

The final mass test session before the new season took place at the track over 1–3 April. On the first day, in hot weather, Mitch Evans (Russian Time) set the fastest lap of the morning session with a time of 1:42.479, with Jordan King (Racing Engineering) setting the quickest lap of the day in the afternoon session with a 1:41.494. An overnight sandstorm delayed the second day of testing for an hour while officials cleaned the track. Sergey Sirotkin (Rapax) was the fastest driver in the morning session with a lap of 1:41.797, and Nobuharu Matsushita (ART Grand Prix) recorded the quickest lap of the afternoon session with a time of 1:40.191. Pierre Gasly (DAMS) recorded the fastest lap time of the three days, a 1:39.632 in the morning session, and Nigel Melker was the quickest driver in the afternoon session with a lap of 1:41.566. Hilmer Motorsport elected to miss the round as they were unable to acquire the services of a driver who could bring financial backing to the team. Team principal Franz Hilmer was confident that he would enter the second round of the season in Catalunya.

== Practice and qualifying ==
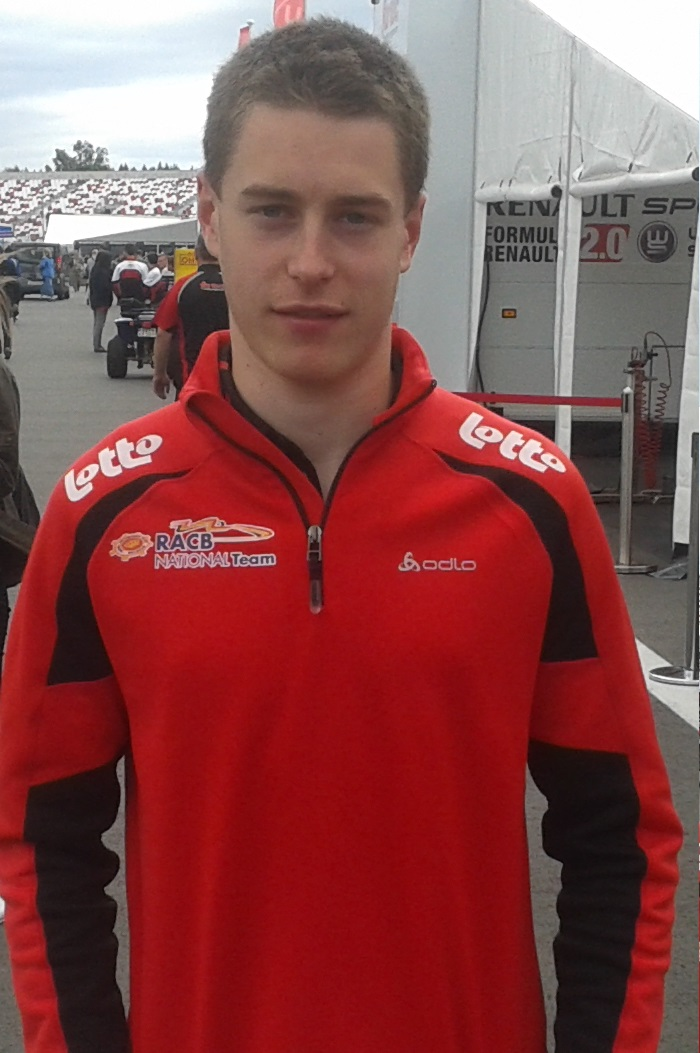
Stoffel Vandoorne (pictured in 2013) had his fifth consecutive pole position in the GP2 Series.

One 45-minute practice session was held on Friday before the two races. King was fastest with a time of 1:42.441, ten-hundredths of a second faster than Racing Engineering teammate Alexander Rossi in second. Alex Lynn of DAMS was third-fastest, ahead of the top ART Grand Prix car of Stoffel Vandoorne. The Campos Racing pair of Arthur Pic and Rio Haryanto were fifth and sixth. Gasly was seventh-fastest, Evans eighth, Raffaele Marciello for Trident ninth, and Matsushita completed the top ten ahead of qualifying. Vandoorne's run ended prematurely with seven minutes of the session remaining when his car stopped due to an oil pressure failure.

Friday afternoon's qualifying session ran for 30-minutes. The drivers' fastest lap times determined the starting order for the first race. The driver who won the pole position was awarded four points that went towards the Drivers' and Teams' Championship races. The session was held in cooler night-time weather conditions. Drivers used soft-compound tyres for their first timed laps before entering the pit lane for new tyres for the remainder of the session. Vandoorne set the pace in the early part of the session and improved to clinch his first pole position of the season, and his fifth consecutive in the series, with a time of 1:39.237. He was joined on the grid's front row by his teammate Matsushita who was three-tenths of a second slower than Vandoorne. Lynn was ninth after his first timed lap but recovered to qualify in third place. Pic, who was Vandoorne's closest contender in the session's opening segment, took fourth, ahead of Marciello who was stuck in second gear until his team corrected the issue. King was relegated to sixth by Marciello's fastest lap. Norman Nato (Arden International) and Rossi were seventh and eighth. Gasly in ninth made a mistake late in the session and Sirotkin was tenth. Russian Time's Artem Markelov was the fastest driver to not qualify in the top-ten starting positions. Haryanto ran strongly earl on but took 12th after he was unable to improve on his second set of soft-compound tyres. He was ahead of Evans, Robert Visoiu, and Richie Stanaway. The two Carlin drivers qualified in 16th and 18th with Julián Leal ahead of teammate Marco Sørensen. They were separated by Sergio Canamasas in the faster of the two MP Motorsport cars. André Negrão, Daniël de Jong, Nathanaël Berthon, René Binder, Marlon Stöckinger, and Zoël Amberg were the last of the qualifiers.

=== Qualifying classification ===
Pos.	No.	Driver	Team	Time	Gap	Grid
1	5	(Belgium) Stoffel Vandoorne	ART Grand Prix	1:39.237		1
2	6	(Japan) Nobuharu Matsushita	ART Grand Prix	1:39.545	+0.308	2
3	2	(United Kingdom) Alex Lynn	DAMS	1:39.599	+0.362	3
4	14	(France) Arthur Pic	Campos Racing	1:39.630	+0.393	4
5	11	(Italy) Raffaele Marciello	Trident	1:39.645	+0.408	5
6	7	(United Kingdom) Jordan King	Racing Engineering	1:39.770	+0.533	6
7	21	(France) Norman Nato	Arden International	1:39.857	+0.620	7
8	8	(United States) Alexander Rossi	Racing Engineering	1:39.872	+0.635	8
9	1	(France) Pierre Gasly	DAMS	1:39.877	+0.640	9
10	18	(Russia) Sergey Sirotkin	Rapax	1:39.887	+0.650	9
11	10	(Russia) Artem Markelov	Russian Time	1:39.955	+0.718	10
12	15	(Indonesia) Rio Haryanto	Campos Racing	1:39.961	+0.724	12
13	9	(New Zealand) Mitch Evans	Russian Time	1:39.999	+0.762	13
14	19	(Romania) Robert Vișoiu	Rapax	1:40.128	+0.891	14
15	23	(New Zealand) Richie Stanaway	Status Grand Prix	1:40.251	+1.014	15
16	3	(Colombia) Julián Leal	Carlin	1:40.353	+1.116	16
17	16	(Spain) Sergio Canamasas	MP Motorsport	1:40.434	+1.197	17
18	4	(Denmark) Marco Sørensen	Carlin	1:40.444	+1.207	18
19	20	(Brazil) André Negrão	Arden International	1:40.634	+1.397	19
20	17	(Netherlands) Daniël de Jong	MP Motorsport	1:40.653	+1.416	20
21	26	(France) Nathanaël Berthon	Lazarus	1:40.654	+1.417	21
22	12	(Austria) René Binder	Trident	1:40.773	+1.536	22
23	22	(Philippines) Marlon Stöckinger	Status Grand Prix	1:40.995	+1.758	23
24	27	(Switzerland) Zoël Amberg	Lazarus	1:41.690	+2.453	24

== Races ==
The first race was held over 170 km (110 mi) or 60 minutes (which ever came first) and all drivers were required by regulations to make one pit stop. The first ten finishers scored points, with two given to the fastest lap holder. The grid for the second race was determined by the finishing order of the first but the first eight drivers were in reverse order of where they finished. It was run for 120 km (75 mi) or 45 minutes (which ever came first) and, in contrast to the first race, drivers were not required to make pit stops. The top eight finishers earned points towards their respective championships.

=== Feature race ===
The first race began at 13:10 Arabia Standard Time (UTC+3) on 18 April. The weather at the start of the race was sunny and hot with an air temperature of 30 °C (86 °F) and a track temperature of 49 °C (120 °F) with winds making the track dusty. When the race started, Vandoorne maintained his pole position advantage heading into the first corner. His teammate Matsushita made a slow start, and his anti-stall system activated, allowing several cars to get ahead of him before he got up to speed. Nato moved from seventh to third while Lynn inherited second position. Sørensen's car was damaged while hold off an overtake by de Jong. Rossi overtook his teammate King for seventh place on the same lap and started to close up to Pic and Gasly. Sørensen drove into the pit lane to retire because of the damage sustained from de Jong's pass.

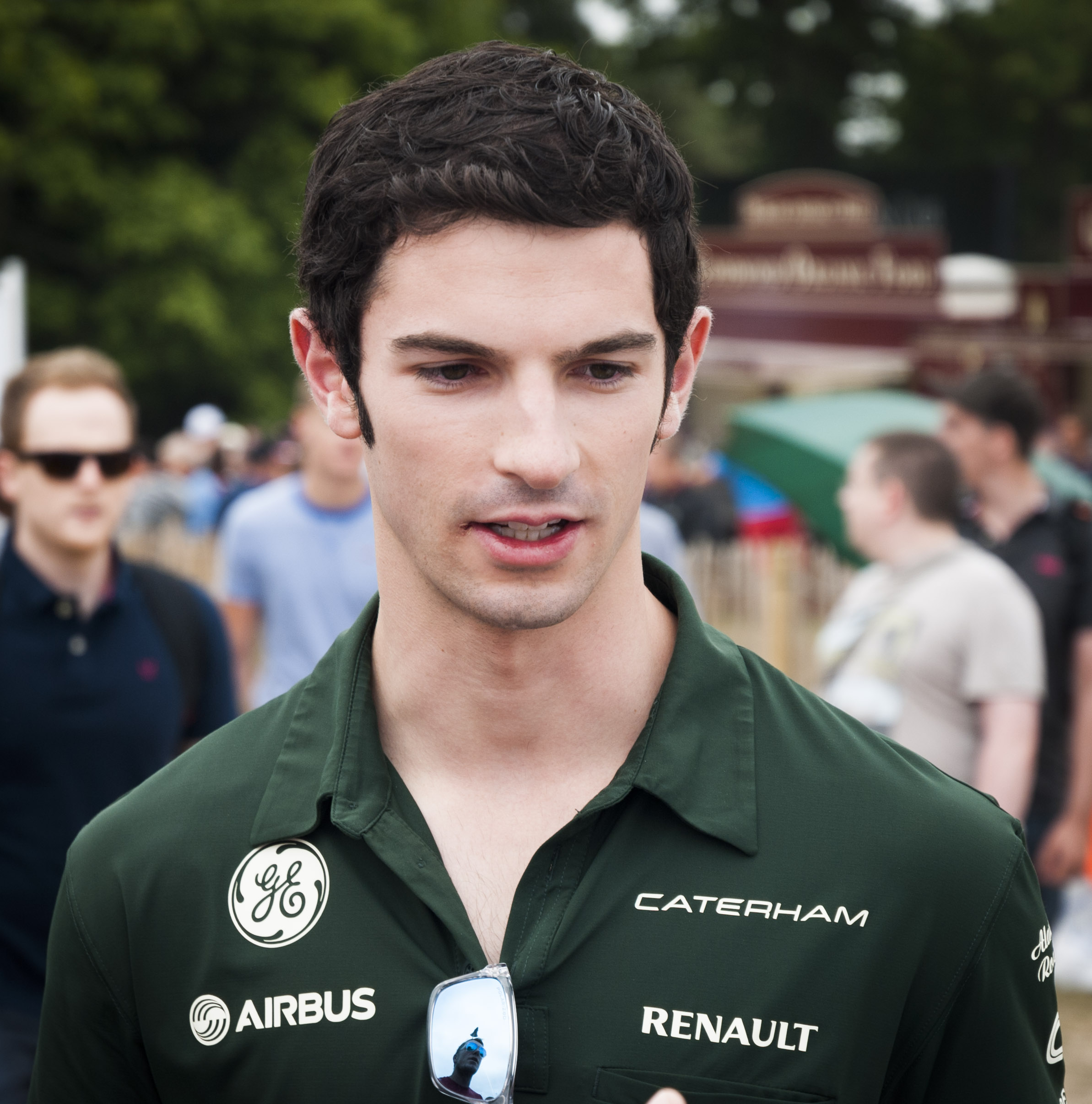
Alexander Rossi (pictured in 2013) finished in third place.

Marciello used DRS on the fourth lap to close to Nato into the first turn while battling him for fourth place. As the two drivers battled through turn four, Pic passed them. Nato changed his line by braking for turn seven, and Marciello made an aggressive pass, causing both drivers to make contact with Pic, sending him spinning backwards. Gasly arrived at the apex of the turn and was collected by Pic who drove into Marciello. Pic, Gasly and Marciello retired immediately and the safety car was deployed on lap five. Drivers who had started on the soft-compound tyres elected to change to the medium compound tyres during their mandatory pit stops, which meant they rejoined the race outside of the top ten. These drivers had to hope that the medium compound tyres would last until the end of the race while pushing hard. A majority of drivers who began on the medium compound tyres remained on the circuit. Marciello entered the pit lane to retire. King was forced to wait behind Rossi during the pit stop phase and fell to 17th.

Vandoorne remained with his intended strategy and led the field back up to speed at the lap-nine restart, ahead of Haryanto and Leal. He fended off an attempted overtake by Haryanto heading into the first corner, while Leal fell to fifth after he was passed by Matsushita and Visoiu. While in traffic, Lynn attempted to pass Rossi into the first turn, but made contact with the rear of his car and sustained front wing damage, losing him downforce and accelerated tyre degregation. Rossi overtook Amberg by the 12th lap. He caught up to Stanaway and quickly overtook him, and passed Berthon using DRS two laps later. Rossi could minimise the time he was behind slower cars because of DRS and a new set of tyres, and made further use of the DRS to pass de Jong and Markelov, allowing him to pull away from the struggling Lynn. Rossi overtook Leal for fifth on lap 15, and the drivers in the middle of the field made their mandatory tyre pit stops. Evans overtook Lynn into turn one on the 18th lap. Lynn reported that his car had tyre degradation problems and lost positions, while cars who conserved their tyres took advantage.

Matsushita made a pit stop at the end of lap 20, moving Rossi to fourth place. Rossi was approximately ten seconds behind Vandoorne. preventing the latter from remaining the leader following his pit stop. Vandoorne made his pit stop at the end of the 22nd lap, and was delayed while his pit crew installed his right-front tyre, losing him time. He reemerged in tenth place. The rest of the leaders made their pit stops promoting Rossi to the lead on lap 23. Rossi was 6.7 seconds ahead of second-placed Evans whom King battled. King overtook Evans for second on lap 25, although Evans used DRS to reclaim the position. Vandoorne was more than 20 seconds behind Rossi, but his new, soft-compound tyres allowed him to lap five seconds faster than Rossi. The battle between Evans and King allowed Rossi to pull away and created an obstruction giving Vandoorne an advantage which he took. He passed King with DRS for on lap 28, and Evans soon after. Rossi led Vandoorne by nine seconds with four laps remaining with the latter lapping three seconds faster in clean air.

Rossi struggled with severe tyre degradation and increasingly locked and flat-spotted his tyres. Vandoorne had reduced Rossi's lead by the penultimate lap. He chose not to rush to avoid damaging his car. He moved into the lead through the fast-left hand corner after leaving the back straight when Rossi ran wide at the first hairpin. Haryanto made a similar strategy call as Vandoorne and passed King and Rossi to move into second position. Vandoorne maintained the lead for the rest of the race and crossed the start/finish line after 32 laps to win. Haryanto finished second, with Rossi in third. King was the highest-placed rookie and took fourth, ahead of Visoiu and Evans. Berthon, Leal, Negrão, and Matsushita made up seventh through tenth. Eleventh-place finisher Stöckinger became the first Filipino driver to complete a GP2 Series race. He was ahead of Sirotkin, Markelov, Canamasas, and Stanaway. Amberg, Binder, de Jong and Lynn were final classified finishers.

=== Feature race classification ===
Drivers who scored championship points are denoted in bold.

Pos.	No.	Driver	Team	Laps	Time/Retired	Grid	Points
1	5	(Belgium) **Stoffel Vandoorne**	**ART Grand Prix**	32	1:01:23.306	1	31 (25+4+2)
2	15	(Indonesia) **Rio Haryanto**	**Campos Racing**	32	+5.056	12	18
3	8	(United States) **Alexander Rossi**	**Racing Engineering**	32	+5.497	8	15
4	7	(United Kingdom) **Jordan King**	**Racing Engineering**	32	+12.322	6	12
5	19	(Romania) **Robert Vișoiu**	**Rapax**	32	+20.048	14	10
6	9	(New Zealand) **Mitch Evans**	**Russian Time**	32	+25.543	13	8
7	26	(France) **Nathanaël Berthon**	**Lazarus**	32	+27.729	21	6
8	3	(Colombia) **Julián Leal**	**Carlin**	32	+28.463	16	4
9	20	(Brazil) **André Negrão**	**Arden International**	32	+29.502	19	2
10	6	(Japan) **Nobuharu Matsushita**	**ART Grand Prix**	32	+29.664	2	1
11	22	(Philippines) Marlon Stöckinger	Status Grand Prix	32	+36.875	23	
12	18	(Russia) Sergey Sirotkin	Rapax	32	+38.516	10	
13	10	(Russia) Artem Markelov	Russian Time	32	+41.021	11	
14	16	(Spain) Sergio Canamasas	MP Motorsport	32	+41.391	17	
15	23	(New Zealand) Richie Stanaway	Status Grand Prix	32	+43.375	15	
16	27	(Switzerland) Zoël Amberg	Lazarus	32	+44.062	24	
17	12	(Austria) René Binder	Trident	32	+44.682	22	
18	17	(Netherlands) Daniël de Jong	MP Motorsport	32	+48.421	20	
19	2	(United Kingdom) Alex Lynn	DAMS	32	+1:05.572	3	
Ret	11	(Italy) Raffaele Marciello	Trident	5	Collision	5	
Ret	1	(France) Pierre Gasly	DAMS	4	Collision	9	
Ret	21	(France) Norman Nato	Arden International	4	Collision	7	
Ret	4	(Denmark) Marco Sørensen	Carlin	4	Did not finish	18	
Ret	14	(France) Arthur Pic	Campos Racing	4	Collision	4	
Fastest lap: Stoffel Vandoorne (ART Grand Prix) — 1:44.617 (on lap 24)

=== Sprint race ===
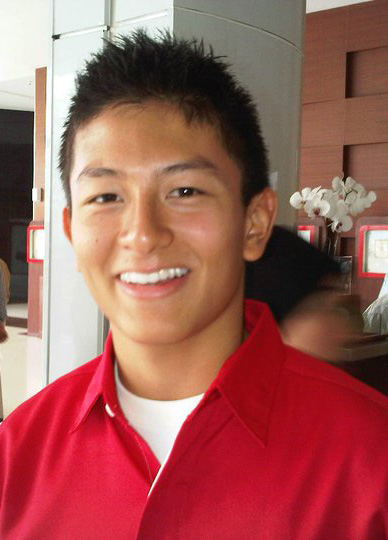
Rio Haryanto (pictured in 2011) clinched the first GP2 Series victory of his career.

The second event started at 14:15 local time on 19 April. Sirotkin was required to start from the pit lane after stalling his car at the beginning of the formation lap. When the race started, pole position starter Leal maintained the lead into the first corner by driving aggressively in front of the field of cars. Haryanto moved from seventh to third by running on the outside, while a slow getaway dropped Berthon to seventh. King lost the most positions, moving from fifth to 13th, which he attributed to driving conservatively on the formation lap, and having no grip while moving off his starting position. Leal pulled out to the lead over the rest of the field by pushing hard. After completing two laps, Binder retired from the race, having made contact with another car, which damaged one of his front left suspension arms. Evans was overtaken by Haryanto for second place in the first turn on lap four, while Negrão lost position when he was passed by Visoiu, Matsushita, Vandoorne, and Rossi.

King made contact with Canamasas in the fourth corner while driving alongside him during lap four. Both went off the circuit, with Canamasas sustaining front wing damage, which stopped his car. He became the race's second (and final) retirement. King continued but rejoined in 12th. Leal slowed due to tyre degradation, allowing Haryanto to close up and passed him by deploying DRS for the lead on the inside on lap eight in turn one. Evans attempted to pass Leal but ran wide, allowing the latter to retake the second position. Visoiu took advantage and overtook Leal for second place. Evans again drove aggressively but Leal was defensive and his front wing endplate glanced Evans' front-left tyre at the turn eight hairpin. Evans drove to the pit lane for replacement tyres. Leal remained on the track, but Visoiu overtook him for second at the first corner on lap 10. Rossi passed Leal for sixth place, while King recovered to run in ninth position.

Haryanto led Visoiu, who had worn his tyres, by three seconds and the latter was unable to maintain the pace, being overtaken by Matsushita. Vandoorne was overtaken Visoiu on the pit lane straight with DRS at the start of the 16th lap. Vandoorne began to push hard and lapped one second faster than his teammate Matsushita. He passed Matsushita for second place on lap 18, providing him with an opportunity to attempt to catch Haryanto over the rest of the race. Haryanto responded and pulled away from Vandoorne. His teammate Matsushita struggled with pace and was passed by Rossi for third place. Berthon recovered from his poor start and overtook Rossi, with DRS, at the start of the final lap. Haryanto crossed the start/finish line after 23 laps to win his first GP2 Series race in his 70th attempt. Vandoorne finished second, ahead of third-placed Berthon, which brought Lazarus the first podium place. Rossi took fourth, with Leal fifth. Matsushita, Visoiu, and Negrão rounded out the points-scoring positions. King, Pic, Stanaway, Markelov, de Jong, and Sirotkin filled the next five positions, while Lynn, Nato, Evans, Amberg, Stöckinger, Marciello, Sørensen, and Gasly were the final classified finishers.

=== Sprint race classification ===
Drivers who scored championship points are denoted in bold.

Pos.	No.	Driver	Team	Laps	Time/Retired	Grid	Points
1	15	(Indonesia) **Rio Haryanto**	**Campos Racing**	23	41:35.490	7	15
2	5	(Belgium) **Stoffel Vandoorne**	**ART Grand Prix**	23	+3.004	8	12
3	26	(France) **Nathanaël Berthon**	**Lazarus**	23	+5.639	2	10
4	8	(United States) **Alexander Rossi**	**Racing Engineering**	23	+6.258	6	8
5	3	(Colombia) **Julián Leal**	**Carlin**	23	+13.945	1	6
6	6	(Japan) **Nobuharu Matsushita**	**ART Grand Prix**	23	+15.923	10	6 (4+2)
7	19	(Romania) **Robert Vișoiu**	**Rapax**	23	+19.794	4	2
8	20	(Brazil) **André Negrão**	**Arden International**	23	+20.159	9	1
9	7	(United Kingdom) Jordan King	Racing Engineering	23	+21.101	5	
10	14	(France) Arthur Pic	Campos Racing	23	+25.690	23	
11	23	(New Zealand) Richie Stanaway	Status Grand Prix	23	+32.040	15	
12	10	(Russia) Artem Markelov	Russian Time	23	+33.200	13	
13	17	(Netherlands) Daniël de Jong	MP Motorsport	23	+34.335	18	
14	18	(Russia) Sergey Sirotkin	Rapax	23	+34.361	PL^{1}	
15	2	(United Kingdom) Alex Lynn	DAMS	23	+35.050	19	
16	21	(France) Norman Nato	Arden International	23	+39.501	24^{2}	
17	9	(New Zealand) Mitch Evans	Russian Time	23	+39.536	3	
18	27	(Austria) Zoël Amberg	Lazarus	23	+41.084	16	
19	22	(Philippines) Marlon Stöckinger	Status Grand Prix	23	+43.390	11	
20	11	(Italy) Raffaele Marciello	Trident	23	+47.545	20	
21	4	(Denmark) Marco Sørensen	Carlin	23	+49.715	22	
22	1	(France) Pierre Gasly	DAMS	23	+56.504	21	
Ret	16	(Spain) Sergio Canamasas	MP Motorsport	4	Damage	14	
Ret	12	(Austria) René Binder	Trident	2	Suspension	17	
Fastest lap: Raffaele Marciello (Trident) — 1:44.715 (on lap 23)

Notes:

- **^1** — Sergey Sirotkin started from the pit lane after her car got stuck on the starting grid at the start of the formation lap.
- **^2** — Norman Nato received a three grid penalty for causing a collision with Raffaele Marciello and Arthur Pic in the feature race.

== Post-race ==
The top three drivers of both races appeared on the podium to collect their trophies and to participate later in a press conference. After the feature race, Vandoorne said that it was a "very entertaining race" and he thought that the safety car came out at the wrong time. He stated that from his point of view overtaking was easy, and he did not expect to catch Rossi, but it had been a good start for the season starting from pole position, recording the fastest lap, and winning the event. Haryanto said it felt "really great" to finish on the podium, but thought it would be difficult to close the gap with drivers in front of him. He stated that he did not expect to be fast on the soft-compound tyres but knew that his pace in a race was good. Having been disappointed with his qualifying result, Rossi was pleased to stand on the podium and felt he achieved the best result for Racing Engineering, but that he should have not pushed too hard when he knew Vandoorne was in clean air.

When the sprint race had finished, Haryanto said his first victory had been "a long time coming", and that the event was a "perfect race". He said he expected to score points and finish on the podium at the next round in Catalunya, because the events at Bahrain increased his confidence and helped him to believe he would achieve more success. Vandoorne stated the second race was also interesting, and was happy with his results. He said that his team had observed lap times from the previous race and knew he would be strong in the second event. Vandoorne said he was looking forward to Catalunya and had to maintain his momentum to demonstrate the team is "capable of winning there as well". Berthon said that his third-place finish was "simply amazing" for his team and himself, and his position in the Drivers' Championship was "incredible". He commented that his team felt "different" and was working hard to give him the best possible car. All they were missing was "some pace". The stewards deemed Canamasas to have left insufficient room in the collision between himself and King and was issued with a three-place grid penalty for the next round in Catalunya.

Following this, the first race of the season, Vandoorne led the Drivers' Championship with 43 points, ten ahead of second-placed Haryanto. Rossi was third with 23 points, with Berthon in fourth. King was fifth with 12 points. ART Grand Prix took the lead of the Teams' Championship with 50 points; Racing Engineering and Campos Racing were close behind in second and third with 35 and 33 points. Lazarus was fourth on 16 points, four in front of Rapax in fifth place, with ten races left in the season.

== Standings after the round ==
Drivers' Championship standings

+/–	Pos	Driver	Points
	1	(Belgium) Stoffel Vandoorne	43
	2	(Indonesia) Rio Haryanto	33
	3	(United States) Alexander Rossi	23
	4	(France) Nathanaël Berthon	16
	5	(United Kingdom) Jordan King	12

Teams' Championship standings

+/–	Pos	Team	Points
	1	(France) ART Grand Prix	50
	2	(Spain) Racing Engineering	35
	3	(Spain) Campos Racing	33
	4	(Venezuela) Lazarus (Note: Lazarus competed under a state Venezuelan licence in rounds 1–5.)	16
	5	(Italy) Rapax	12

- Note: Only the top five positions are included for both sets of standings.

== Notes ==
Previous round: 2014 Yas Marina GP2 Series round	GP2 Series; 2015 season	Next round: 2015 Catalunya GP2 Series round
Previous round: 2014 Bahrain GP2 Series round	Bahrain GP2 round	Next round: 2015 Bahrain 2nd GP2 Series round (November)
