= 2015 Monza GP2 Series round =

Motor race held in Monza, Italy

(Italy) 2015 Monza GP2 round
Round details
- Round 8 of 11 rounds in the 2015 GP2 Series
- Layout of the Autodromo Nazionale Monza
- Location: Autodromo Nazionale Monza, Monza, Italy
- Course: Permanent racing facility 5.793 km (3.600 mi)

GP2 Series

Feature race
- Date: 5 September 2015
- Laps: 30

Pole position
Driver	(France) Pierre Gasly	DAMS
- Time: 1:31.272

Podium
First	(United States) Alexander Rossi	Racing Engineering
Second	(Belgium) Stoffel Vandoorne	ART Grand Prix
Third	(New Zealand) Mitch Evans	Russian Time

Fastest lap
Driver	(Venezuela) Johnny Cecotto Jr.	Trident
- Time: 1:33.723 (on lap 27)

Sprint race
- Date: 6 September 2015
- Laps: 21

Podium
First	(New Zealand) Mitch Evans	Russian Time
Second	(France) Arthur Pic	Campos Racing
Third	(Belgium) Stoffel Vandoorne	ART Grand Prix

Fastest lap
Driver	(United Kingdom) Alex Lynn	DAMS
- Time: 1:32.818 (on lap 18)

The 2015 Monza GP2 Series round was a GP2 Series motor race held on September 5 and 6, 2015 at Autodromo Nazionale Monza, Italy. It was the eighth round of the 2015 GP2 Series. The race supported the 2015 Italian Grand Prix.

== Classification ==
=== Qualifying ===
Pos.	No.	Driver	Team	Time	Gap	Grid
1	1	(France) Pierre Gasly	DAMS	1:31.272		1
2	9	(New Zealand) Mitch Evans	Russian Time	1:31.424	+0.152	23
3	5	(Belgium) Stoffel Vandoorne	ART Grand Prix	1:31.478	+0.206	2
4	2	(United Kingdom) Alex Lynn	DAMS	1:31.615	+0.343	3
5	18	(Russia) Sergey Sirotkin	Rapax	1:31.640	+0.368	4
6	15	(Indonesia) Rio Haryanto	Campos Racing	1:31.898	+0.626	5
7	14	(France) Arthur Pic	Campos Racing	1:31.938	+0.666	6
8	23	(New Zealand) Richie Stanaway	Status Grand Prix	1:31.985	+0.713	7
9	27	(Spain) Sergio Canamasas	Daiko Team Lazarus	1:32.000	+0.728	24
10	8	(United States) Alexander Rossi	Racing Engineering	1:32.014	+0.742	8
11	11	(Italy) Raffaele Marciello	Trident	1:32.071	+0.799	9
12	6	(Japan) Nobuharu Matsushita	ART Grand Prix	1:32.100	+0.828	10
13	19	(Romania) Robert Vișoiu	Rapax	1:32.155	+0.883	11
14	3	(Colombia) Julián Leal	Carlin	1:32.159	+0.887	12
15	21	(France) Norman Nato	Arden International	1:32.174	+0.902	13
16	12	(Venezuela) Johnny Cecotto Jr.	Trident	1:32.176	+0.904	14
17	7	(United Kingdom) Jordan King	Racing Engineering	1:32.283	+1.011	15
18	20	(Brazil) André Negrão	Arden International	1:32.386	+1.114	16
19	4	(United Kingdom) Jann Mardenborough	Carlin	1:32.398	+1.126	17
20	17	(Austria) René Binder	MP Motorsport	1:32.447	+1.175	18
21	22	(Philippines) Marlon Stöckinger	Status Grand Prix	1:32.619	+1.347	22
22	10	(Russia) Artem Markelov	Russian Time	1:32.637	+1.365	19
23	24	(Switzerland) Simon Trummer	Hilmer Motorsport	1:32.794	+1.522	20
24	26	(Switzerland) Patric Niederhauser	Daiko Team Lazarus	1:32.913	+1.641	21
25	16	(Netherlands) Meindert van Buuren	MP Motorsport	1:33.126	+1.854	25

=== Feature race ===
Pos.	No.	Driver	Team	Laps	Time/Retired	Grid	Points
1	8	(United States) Alexander Rossi	Racing Engineering	30	49:32.084	8	25
2	5	(Belgium) Stoffel Vandoorne	ART Grand Prix	30	+1.275	2	18
3	9	(New Zealand) Mitch Evans	Russian Time	30	+15.094	23	15
4	23	(New Zealand) Richie Stanaway	Status Grand Prix	30	+17.784	7	12
5	10	(Russia) Artem Markelov	Russian Time	30	+18.198	19	10
6	21	(France) Norman Nato	Arden International	30	+18.382	13	8+2
7	14	(France) Arthur Pic	Campos Racing	30	+18.842	6	6
8	7	(United Kingdom) Jordan King	Racing Engineering	30	+19.862	15	4
9	19	(Romania) Robert Vișoiu	Rapax	30	+22.083	11	2
10	17	(Austria) René Binder	MP Motorsport	30	+22.556	18	1
11	27	(Spain) Sergio Canamasas	Daiko Team Lazarus	30	+30.868	24	
12	3	(Colombia) Julián Leal	Carlin	30	+32.871	12	
13	15	(Indonesia) Rio Haryanto	Campos Racing	30	+36.041	5	
14	20	(Brazil) André Negrão	Arden International	30	+36.166	16	
15	11	(Italy) Raffaele Marciello	Trident	30	+37.170	9	
16	24	(Switzerland) Simon Trummer	Hilmer Motorsport	30	+37.541	21	
17	26	(Switzerland) Patric Niederhauser	Daiko Team Lazarus	30	+45.741	22	
18	12	(Venezuela) Johnny Cecotto Jr.	Trident	30	+46.250	14	
19	4	(United Kingdom) Jann Mardenborough	Carlin	30	+48.908	17	
Ret	18	(Russia) Sergey Sirotkin	Rapax	15	Collision damage	4	
Ret	2	(United Kingdom) Alex Lynn	DAMS	13	Collision	3	
Ret	1	(France) Pierre Gasly	DAMS	10	Retired	1	4
Ret	6	(Japan) Nobuharu Matsushita	ART Grand Prix	9	Retired	10	
Ret	22	(Philippines) Marlon Stöckinger	Status Grand Prix	9	Retired	19	
Ret	16	(Netherlands) Meindert van Buuren	MP Motorsport	2	Accident	25	

=== Sprint race ===
Pos.	No.	Driver	Team	Laps	Time/Retired	Grid	Points
1	9	(New Zealand) Mitch Evans	Russian Time	21	34:17.890	6	15+2
2	14	(France) Arthur Pic	Campos Racing	21	+0.707	2	12
3	5	(Belgium) Stoffel Vandoorne	ART Grand Prix	21	+1.066	7	10
4	23	(New Zealand) Richie Stanaway	Status Grand Prix	21	+7.623	5	8
5	18	(Russia) Sergey Sirotkin	Rapax	21	+8.871	20	6
6	27	(Spain) Sergio Canamasas	Daiko Team Lazarus	21	+11.895	11	4
7	11	(Italy) Raffaele Marciello	Trident	21	+12.150	15	2
8	17	(Austria) René Binder	MP Motorsport	21	+13.241	10	1
9	3	(Colombia) Julián Leal	Carlin	21	+14.352	12	
10	2	(United Kingdom) Alex Lynn	DAMS	21	+14.502	21	
11	15	(Indonesia) Rio Haryanto	Campos Racing	21	+15.250	13	
12	1	(France) Pierre Gasly	DAMS	21	+15.672	22	
13	12	(Venezuela) Johnny Cecotto Jr.	Trident	21	+17.686	18	
14	10	(Russia) Artem Markelov	Russian Time	21	+18.625	5	
15	6	(Japan) Nobuharu Matsushita	ART Grand Prix	21	+22.464	23	
16	24	(Switzerland) Simon Trummer	Hilmer Motorsport	21	+23.094	16	
17	26	(Switzerland) Patric Niederhauser	Daiko Team Lazarus	21	+25.186	17	
18	20	(Brazil) André Negrão	Arden International	21	+25.570	14	
19	22	(Philippines) Marlon Stöckinger	Status Grand Prix	21	+26.228	24	
20	4	(United Kingdom) Jann Mardenborough	Carlin	21	+35.277	19	
Ret	19	(Romania) Robert Vișoiu	Rapax	6	Retired	9	
Ret	8	(United States) Alexander Rossi	Racing Engineering	6	Retired	8	
Ret	7	(United Kingdom) Jordan King	Racing Engineering	1	Retired	1	
Ret	21	(France) Norman Nato	Arden International	0	Retired	3	
DNS	16	(Netherlands) Meindert van Buuren	MP Motorsport	0	Did not start	25	

== See also ==
- 2015 Italian Grand Prix
- 2015 Monza GP3 Series round

Previous round: 2015 Spa-Francorchamps GP2 Series round	GP2 Series; 2015 season	Next round: 2015 Sochi GP2 Series round
Previous round: 2014 Monza GP2 Series round	Monza GP2 round	Next round: 2016 Monza GP2 Series round
