= 2015 Red Bull Ring GP2 Series round =

(Austria) 2015 Red Bull Ring GP2 round
Round details
- Round 4 of 11 rounds in the 2015 GP2 Series
- Layout of the Red Bull Ring
- Location: Red Bull Ring, Spielberg, Styria, Austria
- Course: Permanent racing facility 4.326 km (2.688 mi)

GP2 Series

Feature race
- Date: 20 June 2015
- Laps: 40

Pole position
Driver	(Belgium) Stoffel Vandoorne	ART Grand Prix
- Time: 1:14.174

Podium
First	(Belgium) Stoffel Vandoorne	ART Grand Prix
Second	(Russia) Sergey Sirotkin	Rapax
Third	(United Kingdom) Alex Lynn	DAMS

Fastest lap
Driver	(United Kingdom) Alex Lynn	DAMS
- Time: 1:15.757 (on lap 36)

Sprint race
- Date: 21 June 2015
- Laps: 28

Podium
First	(Indonesia) Rio Haryanto	Campos Racing
Second	(Belgium) Stoffel Vandoorne	ART Grand Prix
Third	(Japan) Nobuharu Matsushita	ART Grand Prix

Fastest lap
Driver	(United Kingdom) Jordan King	Racing Engineering
- Time: 1:16.199 (on lap 11)

The 2015 Red Bull Ring GP2 Series round was a GP2 Series motor race held on 20 and 21 June 2015 at the Red Bull Ring in Austria. It was the fourth round of the 2015 GP2 Series. The race weekend supported the 2015 Austrian Grand Prix.

== Classification ==
=== Qualifying ===
Pos.	No.	Driver	Team	Time	Grid
1	5	(Belgium) Stoffel Vandoorne	ART Grand Prix	1:14.174	1
2	6	(Japan) Nobuharu Matsushita	ART Grand Prix	1:14.263	2
3	1	(France) Pierre Gasly	DAMS	1:14.300	3
4	18	(Russia) Sergey Sirotkin	Rapax	1:14.434	4
5	15	(Indonesia) Rio Haryanto	Campos Racing	1:14.481	5
6	11	(Italy) Raffaele Marciello	Rapax	1:14.483	6
7	24	(United Kingdom) Nick Yelloly	Hilmer Motorsport	1:14.538	7
8	7	(United Kingdom) Jordan King	Racing Engineering	1:14.574	8
9	14	(France) Arthur Pic	Campos Racing	1:14.650	9
10	2	(United Kingdom) Alex Lynn	DAMS	1:14.818	10
11	9	(New Zealand) Mitch Evans	Russian Time	1:14.861	11
12	8	(United States) Alexander Rossi	Racing Engineering	1:14.881	12
13	3	(Colombia) Julián Leal	Carlin	1:14.893	13
14	23	(New Zealand) Richie Stanaway	Status Grand Prix	1:14.922	14
15	10	(Russia) Artem Markelov	Russian Time	1:14.978	15
16	21	(France) Norman Nato	Arden International	1:14.996	16
17	12	(Austria) Rene Binder	Trident	1:15.030	17
18	17	(Netherlands) Daniël de Jong	MP Motorsport	1:15.207	18
19	19	(Romania) Robert Visoiu	Rapax	1:15.396	19
20	22	(Philippines) Marlon Stöckinger	Status Grand Prix	1:15.434	20
21	20	(Brazil) André Negrão	Arden International	1:15.537	21
22	26	(France) Nathanaël Berthon	Team Lazarus	1:30.609	22
23	4	(Denmark) Marco Sørensen	Carlin	1:15.853	23
24	25	(Switzerland) Simon Trummer	Hilmer Motorsport	1:16.159	24

=== Feature Race ===
Pos.	No.	Driver	Team	Laps	Time/Retired	Grid	Points
1	5	(Belgium) Stoffel Vandoorne	ART Grand Prix	40	53:42.694	1	25+4+2
2	18	(Russia) Sergey Sirotkin	Rapax	40	+11.788	4	18
3	2	(United Kingdom) Alex Lynn	DAMS	40	+15.318	10	15
4	6	(Japan) Nobuharu Matsushita	ART Grand Prix	40	+15.849	2	12
5	10	(Russia) Artem Markelov	Russian Time	40	+19.420	15	10
6	8	(United States) Alexander Rossi	Racing Engineering	40	+21.154	12	8
7	15	(Indonesia) Rio Haryanto	Campos Racing	40	+22.583	5	6
8	24	(United Kingdom) Nick Yelloly	Hilmer Motorsport	40	+26.897	7	4
9	14	(France) Arthur Pic	Campos Racing	40	+35.069	9	2
10	9	(New Zealand) Mitch Evans	Russian Time	40	+38.649	11	1
11	19	(Romania) Robert Visoiu	Rapax	40	+42.068	21	
12	7	(United Kingdom) Jordan King	Racing Engineering	40	+42.569	8	
13	1	(France) Pierre Gasly	DAMS	40	+44.489	3	
14	3	(Colombia) Julián Leal	Carlin	40	+49.600	13	
15	11	(Italy) Raffaele Marciello	Trident	40	+50.336	6	
16	20	(Brazil) André Negrão	Arden International	40	+50.729	21	
17	12	(Austria) Rene Binder	Trident	40	+54.619	23	
18	4	(Denmark) Marco Sørensen	Carlin	40	+55.933	23	
19	22	(Philippines) Marlon Stöckinger	Status Grand Prix	40	+59.209	20	
20	21	(France) Norman Nato	Arden International	40	+59.505	16	
21	17	(Netherlands) Daniël de Jong	MP Motorsport	40	+1:02.603	15	
22	25	(Switzerland) Simon Trummer	Hilmer Motorsport	40	+1:15.237	24	
23	23	(New Zealand) Richie Stanaway	Status Grand Prix	39	+1 Lap	14	
Ret	26	(France) Nathanaël Berthon	Team Lazarus	1	Retired	22	
Fastest lap: Nick Yelloly (Hilmer Motorsport) — 1:22.314 (on lap 23)

== See also ==
- 2015 Austrian Grand Prix
- 2015 Red Bull Ring GP3 Series round

Previous round: 2015 Monaco GP2 Series round	GP2 Series; 2015 season	Next round: 2015 Silverstone GP2 Series round
Previous round: 2014 Red Bull Ring GP2 Series round	Red Bull Ring GP2 round	Next round: 2016 Red Bull Ring GP2 Series round
