= 2015 Catalunya GP2 Series round =

2015 GP2 race held in Spain

(Spain) 2015 Catalunya GP2 round
Round details
- Round 2 of 11 rounds in the 2015 GP2 Series
- Layout of the Circuit de Catalunya
- Location: Circuit de Catalunya, Montmeló, Spain
- Course: Permanent racing facility 4.665 km (2.892 mi)

GP2 Series

Feature race
- Date: 9 May 2015
- Laps: 37

Pole position
Driver	(Belgium) Stoffel Vandoorne	ART Grand Prix
- Time: 1:29.273

Podium
First	(Belgium) Stoffel Vandoorne	ART Grand Prix
Second	(New Zealand) Mitch Evans	Russian Time
Third	(United States) Alexander Rossi	Racing Engineering

Fastest lap
Driver	(New Zealand) Mitch Evans	Russian Time
- Time: 1:34.748 (on lap 30)

Sprint race
- Date: 10 May 2015
- Laps: 25

Podium
First	(United Kingdom) Alex Lynn	DAMS
Second	(Belgium) Stoffel Vandoorne	ART Grand Prix
Third	(France) Pierre Gasly	DAMS

Fastest lap
Driver	(Belgium) Stoffel Vandoorne	ART Grand Prix
- Time: 1:34.628 (on lap 8)

The 2015 Catalunya GP2 Series round was a GP2 Series motor race held on May 9 and 10, 2015 at the Circuit de Catalunya in Spain. It was the second round of the 2015 GP2 Series. The race weekend supported the 2015 Spanish Grand Prix.

Stoffel Vandoorne took pole position and victory in the feature race, while Alex Lynn took the chequered flag in the sprint race.

== Classification ==
=== Qualifying ===
Pos.	No.	Driver	Team	Time	Grid
1	5	(Belgium) Stoffel Vandoorne	ART Grand Prix	1:29.273	1
2	2	(United Kingdom) Alex Lynn	DAMS	1:29.680	2
3	1	(France) Pierre Gasly	DAMS	1:30.051	3
4	9	(New Zealand) Mitch Evans	Russian Time	1:30.106	4
5	8	(United States) Alexander Rossi	Racing Engineering	1:30.154	5
6	17	(Netherlands) Daniël de Jong	MP Motorsport	1:30.169	6
7	11	(Italy) Raffaele Marciello	Trident	1:30.191	7
8	15	(Indonesia) Rio Haryanto	Campos Racing	1:30.291	8
9	24	(United Kingdom) Nick Yelloly	Hilmer Motorsport	1:30.375	9
10	3	(Colombia) Julián Leal	Carlin	1:30.402	10
11	14	(France) Arthur Pic	Campos Racing	1:30.411	11
12	21	(France) Norman Nato	Arden International	1:30.416	12
13	23	(New Zealand) Richie Stanaway	Status Grand Prix	1:30.420	13
14	6	(Japan) Nobuharu Matsushita	ART Grand Prix	1:30.649	14
15	7	(United Kingdom) Jordan King	Racing Engineering	1:30.686	15
16	16	(Spain) Sergio Canamasas	MP Motorsport	1:30.722	16
17	19	(Romania) Robert Vișoiu	Rapax	1:30.879	17
18	4	(Denmark) Marco Sørensen	Carlin	1:30.891	18
19	26	(France) Nathanaël Berthon	Lazarus	1:31.029	19
20	22	(Philippines) Marlon Stöckinger	Status Grand Prix	1:31.042	20
21	25	(Venezuela) Johnny Cecotto Jr.	Hilmer Motorsport	1:31.049	21
22	20	(Brazil) André Negrão	Arden International	1:31.390	22
23	18	(Russia) Sergey Sirotkin	Rapax	1:31.394	23
24	12	(Austria) René Binder	Trident	1:31.397	24
25	27	(Switzerland) Zoël Amberg	Lazarus	1:31.751	25
26	10	(Russia) Artem Markelov	Russian Time	No Time Set	26

=== Feature race ===
Pos.	No.	Driver	Team	Laps	Time/Retired	Grid	Points
1	5	(Belgium) Stoffel Vandoorne	ART Grand Prix	37	1:00:31.992	1	29 (25+4)
2	9	(New Zealand) Mitch Evans	Russian Time	37	+1.957	4	20 (18+2)
3	8	(United States) Alexander Rossi	Racing Engineering	37	+4.639	5	15
4	15	(Indonesia) Rio Haryanto	Campos Racing	37	+17.737	8	12
5	2	(United Kingdom) Alex Lynn	DAMS	37	+21.116	2	10
6	11	(Italy) Raffaele Marciello	Trident	37	+23.032	7	8
7	1	(France) Pierre Gasly	DAMS	37	+25.841	3	6
8	21	(France) Norman Nato	Arden International	37	+29.552	12	4
9	14	(France) Arthur Pic	Campos Racing	37	+30.438	11	2
10	23	(New Zealand) Richie Stanaway	Status Grand Prix	37	+31.535	13	1
11	6	(Japan) Nobuharu Matsushita	ART Grand Prix	37	+31.706	14	
12	10	(Russia) Artem Markelov	Russian Time	37	+32.026	26	
13	16	(Spain) Sergio Canamasas	MP Motorsport	37	+54.487	16	
14	7	(United Kingdom) Jordan King	Racing Engineering	37	+55.477	15	
15	17	(Netherlands) Daniël de Jong	MP Motorsport	37	+56.905	6	
16	18	(Russia) Sergey Sirotkin	Rapax	37	+58.303	23	
17	27	(Switzerland) Zoël Amberg	Lazarus	37	+59.720	25	
18	19	(Romania) Robert Vișoiu	Rapax	37	+1:00.163	17	
19	4	(Denmark) Marco Sørensen	Carlin	37	+1:00.694	18	
20	26	(France) Nathanaël Berthon	Lazarus	37	+1:04.186	19	
21	25	(Venezuela) Johnny Cecotto Jr.	Hilmer Motorsport	37	+1:07.785	21	
22	12	(Austria) René Binder	Trident	37	+1:22.650	24	
23	20	(Brazil) André Negrão	Arden International	35	Did not finish	22	
Ret	3	(Colombia) Julián Leal	Carlin	14	Did not finish	10	
Ret	24	(United Kingdom) Nick Yelloly	Hilmer Motorsport	5	Did not finish	9	
Ret	22	(Philippines) Marlon Stöckinger	Status Grand Prix	5	Did not finish	20	
Fastest lap: Mitch Evans (Russian Time) — 1:34.748 (on lap 30)

=== Sprint race ===
Pos.	No.	Driver	Team	Laps	Time/Retired	Grid	Points
1	2	(United Kingdom) Alex Lynn	DAMS	25	41:30.935	4	15
2	5	(Belgium) Stoffel Vandoorne	ART Grand Prix	25	+2.204	8	14 (12+2)
3	1	(France) Pierre Gasly	DAMS	25	+8.320	2	10
4	8	(United States) Alexander Rossi	Racing Engineering	25	+9.614	6	8
5	10	(Russia) Artem Markelov	Russian Time	25	+11.964	12	6
6	15	(Indonesia) Rio Haryanto	Campos Racing	25	+13.686	5	4
7	21	(France) Norman Nato	Arden International	25	+23.506	1	2
8	14	(France) Arthur Pic	Campos Racing	25	+25.090	9	1
9	17	(Netherlands) Daniël de Jong	MP Motorsport	25	+32.003	15	
10	18	(Russia) Sergey Sirotkin	Rapax	25	+33.552	16	
11	7	(United Kingdom) Jordan King	Racing Engineering	25	+33.591	14	
12	26	(France) Nathanaël Berthon	Lazarus	25	+34.276	20	
13	27	(Switzerland) Zoël Amberg	Lazarus	25	+34.560	17	
14	24	(United Kingdom) Nick Yelloly	Hilmer Motorsport	25	+38.041	25	
15	16	(Spain) Sergio Canamasas	MP Motorsport	25	+42.181	13	
16	3	(Colombia) Julián Leal	Carlin	25	+42.742	24	
17	11	(Italy) Raffaele Marciello	Trident	25	+43.110	3	
18	6	(Japan) Nobuharu Matsushita	ART Grand Prix	25	+46.006	11	
19	23	(New Zealand) Richie Stanaway	Status Grand Prix	25	+53.190	10	
20	22	(Philippines) Marlon Stöckinger	Status Grand Prix	25	+53.573	26	
21	20	(Brazil) André Negrão	Arden	25	+55.887	23	
22	4	(Denmark) Marco Sørensen	Carlin	25	+59.535	19	
23	19	(Romania) Robert Vișoiu	Rapax	25	+1:01.886	18	
Ret	25	(Venezuela) Johnny Cecotto Jr.	Hilmer Motorsport	11	Did not finish	21	
Ret	12	(Austria) René Binder	Trident	0	Did not finish	22	
DNS	9	(New Zealand) Mitch Evans	Russian Time	-	Did not start	7	
Fastest lap: Stoffel Vandoorne (ART Grand Prix) — 1:34.628 (on lap 8)

== Standings after the round ==
Drivers' Championship standings

Pos	Driver	Points
1	(Belgium) Stoffel Vandoorne	86
2	(Indonesia) Rio Haryanto	49
3	(United States) Alexander Rossi	46
4	(New Zealand) Mitch Evans	28
5	(United Kingdom) Alex Lynn	25

Teams' Championship standings

Pos	Team	Points
1	(France) ART Grand Prix	93
2	(Spain) Racing Engineering	58
3	(Spain) Campos Racing	52
4	(France) DAMS	41
5	(Russia) Russian Time	34

- Note: Only the top five positions are included for both sets of standings.

== See also ==
- 2015 Spanish Grand Prix
- 2015 Catalunya GP3 Series round

Previous round: 2015 Bahrain GP2 Series round	GP2 Series; 2015 season	Next round: 2015 Monaco GP2 Series round
Previous round: 2014 Catalunya GP2 Series round	Catalunya GP2 round	Next round: 2016 Catalunya GP2 Series round
