= 2015 Hungaroring GP2 Series round =

(Hungary) 2015 Hungaroring GP2 round
Round details
- Round 6 of 11 rounds in the 2015 GP2 Series
- Layout of the Hungaroring
- Location: Hungaroring, Mogyoród, Pest, Hungary
- Course: Permanent racing facility 4.381 km (2.722 mi)

GP2 Series

Feature race
- Date: 25 July 2015
- Laps: 37

Pole position
| Driver | (United Kingdom) Alex Lynn | DAMS |
- Time: 1:28.022

Podium
| First | (United Kingdom) Alex Lynn | DAMS |
| Second | (France) Pierre Gasly | DAMS |
| Third | (Russia) Sergey Sirotkin | Rapax |

Fastest lap
| Driver | (Romania) Robert Vișoiu | Rapax |
- Time: 1:32.335 (on lap 31)

Sprint race
- Date: 26 July 2015
- Laps: 28

Podium
| First | (Japan) Nobuharu Matsushita | ART Grand Prix |
| Second | (Belgium) Stoffel Vandoorne | ART Grand Prix |
| Third | (Russia) Sergey Sirotkin | Rapax |

Fastest lap
| Driver | (Belgium) Stoffel Vandoorne | ART Grand Prix |
- Time: 1:31.985 (on lap 7)

The 2015 Hungaroring GP2 Series round was a GP2 Series motor race held on 24 and 26 July 2015 at the Hungaroring in Mogyoród, Pest, Hungary. It was the sixth round of the 2015 GP2 Series. The race weekend supported the 2015 Hungarian Grand Prix.

== Classification ==
=== Qualifying ===
| Pos. | No. | Driver | Team | Time | Gap | Grid |
|---|---|---|---|---|---|---|
| 1 | 2 | (United Kingdom) Alex Lynn | DAMS | 1:28.022 | — | 1 |
| 2 | 5 | (Belgium) Stoffel Vandoorne | ART Grand Prix | 1:28.041 | +0.019 | 2 |
| 3 | 14 | (France) Arthur Pic | Campos Racing | 1:28.154 | +0.132 | 3 |
| 4 | 11 | (Italy) Raffaele Marciello | Trident | 1:28.272 | +0.250 | 4 |
| 5 | 1 | (France) Pierre Gasly | DAMS | 1:28.361 | +0.339 | 5 |
| 6 | 7 | (United Kingdom) Jordan King | Racing Engineering | 1:28.471 | +0.449 | 6 |
| 7 | 15 | (Indonesia) Rio Haryanto | Campos Racing | 1:28.538 | +0.516 | 7 |
| 8 | 9 | (New Zealand) Mitch Evans | Russian Time | 1:28.608 | +0.586 | 8 |
| 9 | 18 | (Russia) Sergey Sirotkin | Rapax | 1:28.685 | +0.663 | 9 |
| 10 | 24 | (United Kingdom) Nick Yelloly | Hilmer Motorsport | 1:28.782 | +0.760 | 10 |
| 11 | 8 | (United States) Alexander Rossi | Racing Engineering | 1:28.807 | +0.785 | 11 |
| 12 | 16 | (Canada) Nicholas Latifi | MP Motorsport | 1:28.940 | +0.918 | 12 |
| 13 | 20 | (Brazil) André Negrão | Arden International | 1:28.957 | +0.935 | 13 |
| 14 | 23 | (New Zealand) Richie Stanaway | Status Grand Prix | 1:29.038 | +1.016 | 14 |
| 15 | 19 | (Romania) Robert Vișoiu | Rapax | 1:29.079 | +1.057 | 15 |
| 16 | 17 | (Netherlands) Daniël de Jong | MP Motorsport | 1:29.128 | +1.106 | 16 |
| 17 | 10 | (Russia) Artem Markelov | Russian Time | 1:29.198 | +1.176 | 17 |
| 18 | 26 | (France) Nathanaël Berthon | Team Lazarus | 1:29.234 | +1.212 | 18 |
| 19 | 25 | (Spain) Sergio Canamasas | Hilmer Motorsport | 1:29.315 | +1.293 | 19 |
| 20 | 3 | (Colombia) Julián Leal | Carlin | 1:29.351 | +1.329 | 20 |
| 21 | 6 | (Japan) Nobuharu Matsushita | ART Grand Prix | 1:29.635 | +1.613 | 21 |
| 22 | 21 | (France) Norman Nato | Arden International | 1:29.641 | +1.619 | 22 |
| 23 | 22 | (Philippines) Marlon Stöckinger | Status Grand Prix | 1:29.665 | +1.643 | 23 |
| 24 | 4 | (Indonesia) Sean Gelael | Carlin | 1:29.803 | +1.781 | 24 |
| 25 | 12 | (Austria) René Binder | Trident | 1:29.811 | +1.789 | 25 |
| — | 27 | (Switzerland) Zoël Amberg | Team Lazarus | No Time | — | 26 |

=== Feature Race ===
| Pos. | No. | Driver | Team | Laps | Time/Retired | Grid | Points |
|---|---|---|---|---|---|---|---|
| 1 | 2 | (United Kingdom) Alex Lynn | DAMS | 37 | 1:00:10.078 | 1 | 29 (25+4) |
| 2 | 1 | (France) Pierre Gasly | DAMS | 37 | +3.707 | 5 | 18 |
| 3 | 18 | (Russia) Sergey Sirotkin | Rapax | 37 | +9.052 | 9 | 15 |
| 4 | 15 | (Indonesia) Rio Haryanto | Campos Racing | 37 | +9.639 | 7 | 12 |
| 5 | 5 | (Belgium) Stoffel Vandoorne | ART Grand Prix | 37 | +11.621 | 2 | 10 |
| 6 | 7 | (United Kingdom) Jordan King | Racing Engineering | 37 | +12.862 | 6 | 8 |
| 7 | 11 | (Italy) Raffaele Marciello | Trident | 37 | +16.220 | 4 | 6 |
| 8 | 6 | (Japan) Nobuharu Matsushita | ART Grand Prix | 37 | +16.785 | 21 | 4 |
| 9 | 19 | (Romania) Robert Vișoiu | Rapax | 37 | +17.460 | 15 | 4 (2+2) |
| 10 | 17 | (Netherlands) Daniël de Jong | MP Motorsport | 37 | +34.138 | 16 | 1 |
| 11 | 21 | (France) Norman Nato | Arden International | 37 | +36.874 | 22 | |
| 12 | 8 | (United States) Alexander Rossi | Racing Engineering | 37 | +42.242 | 11 | |
| 13 | 14 | (France) Arthur Pic | Campos Racing | 37 | +43.345 | 3 | |
| 14 | 26 | (France) Nathanaël Berthon | Team Lazarus | 37 | +46.412 | 18 | |
| 15 | 16 | (Canada) Nicholas Latifi | MP Motorsport | 37 | +50.732 | 12 | |
| 16 | 3 | (Colombia) Julián Leal | Carlin | 37 | +52.010 | 20 | |
| 17 | 9 | (New Zealand) Mitch Evans | Russian Time | 37 | +56.245 | 8 | |
| 18 | 4 | (Indonesia) Sean Gelael | Carlin | 37 | +57.251 | 24 | |
| 19 | 22 | (Philippines) Marlon Stöckinger | Status Grand Prix | 37 | +1:06.136 | 23 | |
| 20 | 20 | (Brazil) André Negrão | Arden International | 37 | +1:06.681 | 13 | |
| 21 | 23 | (New Zealand) Richie Stanaway | Status Grand Prix | 36 | +1 Lap | 14 | |
| 22 | 10 | (Russia) Artem Markelov | Russian Time | 36 | +1 Lap | 17 | |
| 23 | 12 | (Austria) René Binder | Trident | 33 | +4 Laps | 25 | |
| Ret | 24 | (United Kingdom) Nick Yelloly | Hilmer Motorsport | 31 | Mechanical | 10 | |
| Ret | 25 | (Spain) Sergio Canamasas | Hilmer Motorsport | 1 | Accident damage | 19 | |
| DNS | 27 | (Switzerland) Zoël Amberg | Team Lazarus | 0 | Unfit | 26 | |
Fastest Lap: Robert Vișoiu (Rapax) — 1:32.335 (on lap 31)

== See also ==
- 2015 Hungarian Grand Prix
- 2015 Hungaroring GP3 Series round

| Previous round: 2015 Silverstone GP2 Series round | GP2 Series; 2015 season | Next round: 2015 Spa-Francorchamps GP2 Series round |
| Previous round: 2014 Hungaroring GP2 Series round | Hungaroring GP2 round | Next round: 2016 Hungaroring GP2 Series round |
