= 2015 Silverstone GP2 Series round =

2015 GP2 race held in the United Kingdom

(United Kingdom) 2015 Silverstone GP2 round
Round details
- Round 5 of 11 rounds in the 2015 GP2 Series
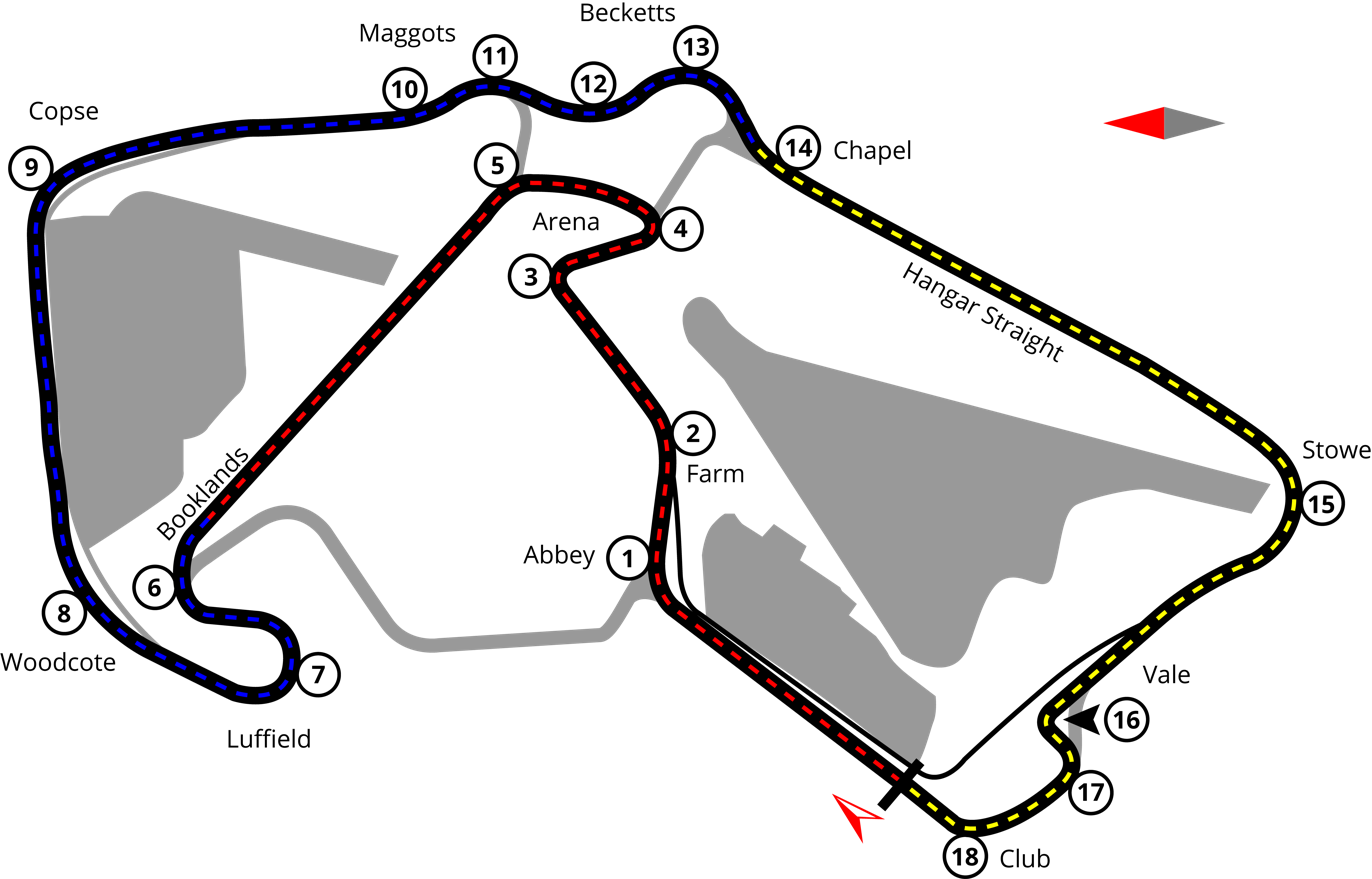
- Layout of the Silverstone Circuit
- Location: Silverstone Circuit; Silverstone, United Kingdom
- Course: Permanent racing facility 5.891 km (3.660 mi)

GP2 Series

Feature race
- Date: 4 July 2015
- Laps: 29

Pole position
Driver	(Russia) Sergey Sirotkin	Rapax
- Time: 1:39.949

Podium
First	(Russia) Sergey Sirotkin	Rapax
Second	(United States) Alexander Rossi	Racing Engineering
Third	(Belgium) Stoffel Vandoorne	ART Grand Prix

Fastest lap
Driver	(Russia) Sergey Sirotkin	Rapax
- Time: 1:42.734 (on lap 28)

Sprint race
- Date: 5 July 2015
- Laps: 21

Podium
First	(Indonesia) Rio Haryanto	Campos Racing
Second	(Italy) Raffaele Marciello	Trident
Third	(France) Pierre Gasly	DAMS

Fastest lap
Driver	(Indonesia) Rio Haryanto	Campos Racing
- Time: 1:42.636 (on lap 2)

The 2015 Silverstone GP2 Series round was a GP2 Series motor race held on 4 and 5 July 2015 at Silverstone Circuit in Silverstone, Britain. It was the fifth round of the 2015 GP2 Series. The race was used to support the 2015 British Grand Prix.

== Classification ==
=== Qualifying ===
Sergey Sirotkin achieved his maiden pole with a time of 1:39.949, followed by Stoffel Vandoorne and Richie Stanaway.

Pos.	No.	Driver	Team	Time	Gap	Grid
1	18	(Russia) Sergey Sirotkin	Rapax	1:39.949		1
2	5	(Belgium) Stoffel Vandoorne	ART Grand Prix	1:40.134	+ 0.185 s	2
3	23	(New Zealand) Richie Stanaway	Status Grand Prix	1:40.378	+ 0.429 s	3
4	8	(United States) Alexander Rossi	Racing Engineering	1:40.419	+ 0.470 s	4
5	14	(France) Arthur Pic	Campos Racing	1:40.434	+ 0.485 s	5
6	1	(France) Pierre Gasly	DAMS	1:40.498	+ 0.549 s	6
7	6	(Japan) Nobuharu Matsushita	ART Grand Prix	1:40.520	+ 0.571 s	7
8	11	(Italy) Raffaele Marciello	Trident	1:40.533	+ 0.584 s	8
9	16	(United Kingdom) Oliver Rowland	MP Motorsport	1:40.537	+ 0.588 s	9
10	3	(Colombia) Julián Leal	Carlin	1:40.547	+ 0.598 s	10
11	24	(United Kingdom) Nick Yelloly	Hilmer Motorsport	1:40.697	+ 0.748 s	11
12	2	(United Kingdom) Alex Lynn	DAMS	1:40.708	+ 0.759 s	12
13	7	(United Kingdom) Jordan King	Racing Engineering	1:40.765	+ 0.816 s	13
14	27	(Spain) Sergio Canamasas	Venezuela Team Lazarus	1:40.789	+ 0.840 s	14
15	15	(Indonesia) Rio Haryanto	Campos Racing	1:40.793	+ 0.844 s	15
16	20	(Brazil) André Negrão	Arden International	1:41.039	+ 1.090 s	16
17	26	(France) Nathanaël Berthon	Venezuela Team Lazarus	1:41.046	+ 1.097 s	17
18	4	(Venezuela) Johnny Cecotto Jr.	Carlin	1:41.064	+ 1.115 s	18
19	19	(Romania) Robert Vișoiu	Rapax	1:41.118	+ 1.169 s	22 ^{1}
20	21	(France) Norman Nato	Arden International	1:41.252	+ 1.303 s	19
21	9	(New Zealand) Mitch Evans	Russian Time	1:41.275	+ 1.326 s	20
22	17	(Netherlands) Daniël de Jong	MP Motorsport	1:41.542	+ 1.593 s	21
23	12	(Austria) René Binder	Trident	1:41.762	+ 1.813 s	23
24	22	(Philippines) Marlon Stöckinger	Status Grand Prix	1:41.802	+ 1.853 s	24
25	10	(Russia) Artem Markelov	Russian Time	1:41.805	+ 1.856 s	25
-	25	(United Kingdom) Jon Lancaster	Hilmer Motorsport	No Time	-	26

Notes
1. – Vișoiu received a three-place grid penalty after he was deemed to have impeded a competitor during the qualifying session.

=== Feature Race ===
Pos.	No.	Driver	Team	Laps	Time/Retired	Grid	Points
1	18	(Russia) Sergey Sirotkin	Rapax	29	53min 13.597sec	1	31 (25+4+2)
2	8	(United States) Alexander Rossi	Racing Engineering	29	+ 5.989 s	4	18
3	5	(Belgium) Stoffel Vandoorne	ART Grand Prix	29	+ 13.566 s	2	15
4	1	(France) Pierre Gasly	DAMS	29	+ 16.729 s	6	12
5	2	(United Kingdom) Alex Lynn	DAMS	29	+ 20.546 s	12	10
6	11	(Italy) Raffaele Marciello	Trident	29	+ 23.550 s	8	8
7	24	(United Kingdom) Nick Yelloly	Hilmer Motorsport	29	+ 23.879 s	11	6
8	15	(Indonesia) Rio Haryanto	Campos Racing	29	+ 25.437 s	15	4
9	3	(Colombia) Julián Leal	Carlin	29	+ 28.753 s	10	2
10 ^{1}	16	(United Kingdom) Oliver Rowland	MP Motorsport	29	+ 25.161 s	9	1
11	17	(Netherlands) Daniël de Jong	MP Motorsport	29	+ 30.373 s	21	
12	19	(Romania) Robert Vișoiu	Rapax	29	+ 36.922 s	22	
13	4	(Venezuela) Johnny Cecotto Jr.	Carlin	29	+ 37.436 s	18	
14 ^{2}	14	(France) Arthur Pic	Campos Racing	29	+ 22.922 s	5	
15	27	(Spain) Sergio Canamasas	Venezuela Team Lazarus	29	+ 44.277 s	14	
16	25	(United Kingdom) Jon Lancaster	Hilmer Motorsport	29	+ 49.850 s	26	
17	12	(Austria) René Binder	Trident	29	+ 53.663 s	23	
18	21	(France) Norman Nato	Arden International	29	+ 57.444 s	19	
19	22	(Philippines) Marlon Stöckinger	Status Grand Prix	29	+ 1:00.867 s	24	
20	20	(Brazil) André Negrão	Arden International	29	+ 1:04.399 s	16	
21	10	(Russia) Artem Markelov	Russian Time	29	+ 1:26.692 s	25	
22	7	(United Kingdom) Jordan King	Racing Engineering	28	Collision	13	
Ret	23	(New Zealand) Richie Stanaway	Status Grand Prix	22	Suspension	3	
Ret	9	(New Zealand) Mitch Evans	Russian Time	9	Retired	20	
Ret	6	(Japan) Nobuharu Matsushita	ART Grand Prix	6	Retired	7	
Ret	26	(France) Nathanaël Berthon	Venezuela Team Lazarus	0	Accident	17	
Fastest lap: Sergey Sirotkin (Rapax) — 1:42.734 (on lap 28)

Notes
1. – Rowland was given a 5-second penalty after having breached track limits several times during the race.
2. – Pic was given a 20-second penalty after being deemed to have collided with Jordan King on the final turn of the race.

=== Sprint Race ===
Pos.	No.	Driver	Team	Laps	Time/Retired	Grid	Points
1	15	(Indonesia) Rio Haryanto	Campos Racing	21	36min 27.949sec	1	17 (15+2)
2	11	(Italy) Raffaele Marciello	Trident	21	+ 1.925 s	3	12
3	1	(France) Pierre Gasly	DAMS	21	+ 4.993 s	5	10
4	8	(United States) Alexander Rossi	Racing Engineering	21	+ 12.589 s	7	8
5	24	(United Kingdom) Nick Yelloly	Hilmer Motorsport	21	+ 13.236 s	2	6
6	2	(United Kingdom) Alex Lynn	DAMS	21	+ 15.539 s	4	4
7	16	(United Kingdom) Oliver Rowland	MP Motorsport	21	+ 15.845 s	10	2
8	18	(Russia) Sergey Sirotkin	Rapax	21	+ 16.305 s	8	1
9	5	(Belgium) Stoffel Vandoorne	ART Grand Prix	21	+ 17.325 s	6	
10	7	(United Kingdom) Jordan King	Racing Engineering	21	+ 17.500 s	22	
11	19	(Romania) Robert Vișoiu	Rapax	21	+ 25.119 s	12	
12	3	(Colombia) Julián Leal	Carlin	21	+ 25.694 s	9	
13	23	(New Zealand) Richie Stanaway	Status Grand Prix	21	+ 32.529 s	23	
14	10	(Russia) Artem Markelov	Russian Time	21	+ 33.454 s	21	
15	20	(Brazil) André Negrão	Arden International	21	+ 33.699 s	20	
16	14	(France) Arthur Pic	Campos Racing	21	+ 34.227 s	14	
17	25	(United Kingdom) Jon Lancaster	Hilmer Motorsport	21	+ 36.112 s	16	
18	12	(Austria) René Binder	Trident	21	+ 37.145 s	17	
19	6	(Japan) Nobuharu Matsushita	ART Grand Prix	21	+ 43.172 s	25	
20	9	(New Zealand) Mitch Evans	Russian Time	21	+ 45.224 s	24	
21	26	(France) Nathanaël Berthon	Venezuela Team Lazarus	21	+ 45.653 s	26	
22	22	(Philippines) Marlon Stöckinger	Status Grand Prix	21	+ 58.353 s	19	
23	21	(France) Norman Nato	Arden International	21	+ 1:03.892 s	18	
24	27	(Spain) Sergio Canamasas	Venezuela Team Lazarus	21	+ 1:20.858 s	15	
25	4	(Venezuela) Johnny Cecotto Jr.	Carlin	21	+ 1:28.853 s	13	
26	17	(Netherlands) Daniël de Jong	MP Motorsport	20	Retired	11	
Fastest lap: Rio Haryanto (Campos Racing) — 1:42.636 (on lap 2)

== See also ==
- 2015 British Grand Prix
- 2015 Silverstone GP3 Series round

Previous round: 2015 Red Bull Ring GP2 Series round	GP2 Series; 2015 season	Next round: 2015 Hungaroring GP2 Series round
Previous round: 2014 Silverstone GP2 Series round	Silverstone GP2 round	Next round: 2016 Silverstone GP2 Series round
