= 2015 Sochi GP2 Series round =

(Russia) 2015 Sochi GP2 round
Round details
- Round 9 of 11 rounds in the 2015 GP2 Series
- Layout of the Sochi Autodrom
- Location: Sochi Autodrom; Sochi, Krasnodar Krai, Russia
- Course: Semi-permanent racing facility 5.853 km (3.637 mi)

GP2 Series

Feature race
- Date: 10 October 2015
- Laps: 15 (Note: The feature race was scheduled to be run over 30 laps. A crash in the first lap brought out a red flag and the race was suspended. The race distance was subsequently adjusted to 15 laps.)

Pole position
Driver	(United Kingdom) Alex Lynn	DAMS
- Time: 2:01.840

Podium
First	(United States) Alexander Rossi	Racing Engineering
Second	(France) Pierre Gasly	DAMS
Third	(Belgium) Stoffel Vandoorne	ART Grand Prix

Fastest lap
Driver	(Belgium) Stoffel Vandoorne	ART Grand Prix
- Time: 1:47.195 (on lap 15)

Sprint race
- Date: 11 October 2015
- Laps: 21

Podium
First	(New Zealand) Richie Stanaway	Status Grand Prix
Second	(Indonesia) Rio Haryanto	Campos Racing
Third	(Italy) Raffaele Marciello	Trident

Fastest lap
Driver	(France) Pierre Gasly	DAMS
- Time: 1:47.368 (on lap 16)

The 2015 Sochi GP2 Series round was a GP2 Series motor race held on October 10 and 11, 2015 at Sochi Autodrom, Russia. It was the ninth round of the 2015 GP2 Series. The race supported the 2015 Russian Grand Prix.

== Classification ==
=== Qualifying ===
Pos	No	Driver	Team	Time	Gap	Grid
1	2	(United Kingdom) Alex Lynn	DAMS	2:01.840		1
2	5	(Belgium) Stoffel Vandoorne	ART Grand Prix	2:01.878	+0.038	2
3	8	(United States) Alexander Rossi	Racing Engineering	2:02.141	+0.301	3
4	1	(France) Pierre Gasly	DAMS	2:02.385	+0.545	4
5	14	(France) Arthur Pic	Campos Racing	2:02.450	+0.610	5
6	12	(Venezuela) Johnny Cecotto Jr.	Trident	2:02.690	+0.850	6
7	11	(Italy) Raffaele Marciello	Trident	2:02.709	+0.869	7
8	23	(New Zealand) Richie Stanaway	Status Grand Prix	2:02.998	+1.158	8
9	21	(France) Norman Nato	Arden International	2:03.133	+1.293	9
10	18	(Russia) Sergey Sirotkin	Rapax	2:03.223	+1.383	10
11	20	(Brazil) André Negrão	Arden International	2:03.382	+1.542	11
12	6	(Japan) Nobuharu Matsushita	ART Grand Prix	2:03.519	+1.679	12
13	15	(Indonesia) Rio Haryanto	Campos Racing	2:03.523	+1.683	13
14	7	(United Kingdom) Jordan King	Racing Engineering	2:03.622	+1.782	19^{1}
15	16	(Canada) Nicholas Latifi	MP Motorsport	2:03.731	+1.891	14
16	22	(Philippines) Marlon Stöckinger	Status Grand Prix	2:03.751	+1.911	15
17	10	(Russia) Artem Markelov	Russian Time	2:04.004	+2.164	16
18	9	(New Zealand) Mitch Evans	Russian Time	2:04.072	+2.232	17
19	3	(United Kingdom) Dean Stoneman	Carlin	2:04.093	+2.253	18
20	26	(France) Nathanaël Berthon	Daiko Team Lazarus	2:04.658	+2.818	20
21	17	(Austria) René Binder	MP Motorsport	2:04.994	+3.154	21
22	27	(Spain) Sergio Canamasas	Daiko Team Lazarus	2:04.998	+3.158	22
23	19	(Romania) Robert Vișoiu	Rapax	2:05.784	+3.944	24^{2}
24	4	(Indonesia) Sean Gelael	Carlin	2:08.361	+6.521	23

Notes

- ^1 – Jordan King was given a five-place grid penalty for causing a collision with Norman Nato at the previous round in Monza sprint race.
- ^2 – Robert Vișoiu was given a five-place grid penalty for causing a collision with Alexander Rossi at the previous round in Monza sprint race.

=== Feature Race ===
Pos	No	Driver	Team	Laps	Time/Retired	Grid	Points
1	8	(United States) Alexander Rossi	Racing Engineering	15	58:33.520	3	12.5
2	1	(France) Pierre Gasly	DAMS	15	+3.101	4	9
3	5	(Belgium) Stoffel Vandoorne	ART Grand Prix	15	+4.279	2	7.5+1
4	18	(Russia) Sergey Sirotkin	Rapax	15	+8.474	10	6
5	15	(Indonesia) Rio Haryanto	Campos Racing	15	+11.884	13	5
6	11	(Italy) Raffaele Marciello	Trident	15	+12.695	7	4
7	23	(New Zealand) Richie Stanaway	Status Grand Prix	15	+14.506	8	3
8	14	(France) Arthur Pic	Campos Racing	15	+15.698	5	2
9	3	(United Kingdom) Dean Stoneman	Carlin	15	+20.660	18	1
10	6	(Japan) Nobuharu Matsushita	ART Grand Prix	15	+23.457	12	0.5
11	9	(New Zealand) Mitch Evans	Russian Time	15	+26.819	17	
12	21	(France) Norman Nato	Arden International	15	+27.140	9	
13	12	(Venezuela) Johnny Cecotto Jr.	Trident	15	+30.727	6	
14	26	(France) Nathanaël Berthon	Daiko Team Lazarus	15	+32.828	20	
15	20	(Brazil) André Negrão	Arden International	15	+37.369	11	
16	17	(Austria) René Binder	MP Motorsport	15	+39.930	21	
17	19	(Romania) Robert Vișoiu	Rapax	15	+42.614	24	
18	16	(Canada) Nicholas Latifi	MP Motorsport	15	+44.888	14	
19	4	(Indonesia) Sean Gelael	Carlin	15	+59.064	23	
Ret	2	(United Kingdom) Alex Lynn	DAMS	10	Accident	1	4
Ret	27	(Spain) Sergio Canamasas	Daiko Team Lazarus	0	Accident	22	
Ret	22	(Philippines) Marlon Stöckinger	Status Grand Prix	0	Accident	15	
Ret	7	(United Kingdom) Jordan King	Racing Engineering	0	Accident	19	
Ret	10	(Russia) Artem Markelov	Russian Time	0	Accident	16	

=== Sprint Race ===
Pos	No	Driver	Team	Laps	Time/Retired	Grid	Points
1	23	(New Zealand) Richie Stanaway	Status Grand Prix	21	40:30.089	2	15
2	15	(Indonesia) Rio Haryanto	Campos Racing	21	+0.579	4	12
3	11	(Italy) Raffaele Marciello	Trident	21	+1.293	3	10
4	5	(Belgium) Stoffel Vandoorne	ART Grand Prix	21	+2.045	6	8
5	1	(France) Pierre Gasly	DAMS	21	+2.459	7	6+2
6	8	(United States) Alexander Rossi	Racing Engineering	21	+4.498	8	4
7	6	(Japan) Nobuharu Matsushita	ART Grand Prix	21	+4.780	10	2
8	9	(New Zealand) Mitch Evans	Russian Time	21	+5.390	11	1
9	21	(France) Norman Nato	Arden International	21	+5.796	12	
10	2	(United Kingdom) Alex Lynn	DAMS	21	+6.923	20	
11	20	(Brazil) André Negrão	Arden International	21	+7.696	15	
12	10	(Russia) Artem Markelov	Russian Time	21	+7.825	23	
13	14	(France) Arthur Pic	Campos Racing	21	+10.187^{3}	1	
14	16	(Canada) Nicholas Latifi	MP Motorsport	21	+11.954	18	
15	7	(United Kingdom) Jordan King	Racing Engineering	21	+12.218	PL^{3}	
16	3	(United Kingdom) Dean Stoneman	Carlin	21	+13.749	9	
17	27	(Spain) Sergio Canamasas	Daiko Team Lazarus	21	+15.927^{4}	21	
18	19	(Romania) Robert Vișoiu	Rapax	21	+17.343	17	
19	26	(France) Nathanaël Berthon	Daiko Team Lazarus	21	+19.467	14	
20	18	(Russia) Sergey Sirotkin	Rapax	21	+21.278^{4}	5	
21	4	(Indonesia) Sean Gelael	Carlin	20	+1 lap	19	
22	12	(Venezuela) Johnny Cecotto Jr.	Trident	19	Accident	13	
Ret	17	(Austria) René Binder	MP Motorsport	0	Accident	16	
Ret	22	(Philippines) Marlon Stöckinger	Status Grand Prix	0	Accident	22	

Notes

- ^3 – Jordan King was given a three-place grid penalty for causing a collision with Marlon Stöckinger feature race. As he will not be able to take it in full since he did not finish race, King started the race from the pit.
- ^4 – Arthur Pic, Sergio Canamasas and Sergey Sirotkin received a five-second time penalty for passing during the safety car.

== Championship standings after the round ==
Drivers' Championship standings

	Pos	Driver	Points
	1	(Belgium) Stoffel Vandoorne	277.5
	2	(United States) Alexander Rossi	169.5
1	3	(Indonesia) Rio Haryanto	126
1	4	(Russia) Sergey Sirotkin	121
1	5	(United Kingdom) Alex Lynn	90

Teams' Championship standings

	Pos	Team	Points
	1	(France) ART Grand Prix	318
	2	(Spain) Racing Engineering	215.5
	3	(Spain) Campos Racing	185
	4	(France) DAMS	168
1	5	(Italy) Rapax	141

== See also ==
- 2015 Russian Grand Prix
- 2015 Sochi GP3 Series round

== Notes ==
Previous round: 2015 Monza GP2 Series round	GP2 Series; 2015 season	Next round: 2015 Bahrain 2nd GP2 Series round
Previous round: 2014 Sochi GP2 Series round	Sochi GP2 round	Next round: 2018 Sochi Formula 2 round
