= Status Grand Prix =

(Canada) Status Grand Prix (Note: Till 2012 the team competed under Irish racing license. In 2013–2015 the team competed under Canada racing license.)
- Founded: 2005
- Founder(s): Mark Gallagher; Mark Kershaw
- Base: Silverstone, England
- Team principal(s): Teddy Yip Jr. Mark Gallagher
- Former series: GP2 Series, A1 Grand Prix (Note: Operation Team at A1 Team Canada, A1 Team Ireland); GP3 Series; European Le Mans Series
- Noted drivers: (Canada) Robert Wickens (Philippines) Marlon Stöckinger (New Zealand) Richie Stanaway (United Kingdom) Oliver Rowland (United Kingdom) Seb Morris (Switzerland) Alex Fontana (Thailand) Sandy Stuvik
- Teams' Championships: A1 Grand Prix: 2008–09 A1 GP
- Website: http://www.statusgp.com/

Status Grand Prix is a former motorsport team registered in Canada.

== Team history ==
Based in Silverstone the team was formed in 2005 to run the A1 Team Ireland franchise in the new A1 Grand Prix series. The team's founders were former Jordan Grand Prix Executive Mark Gallagher and Dublin businessman Mark Kershaw. Later shareholders included former Formula One driver David Kennedy, John Hynes and Teddy Yip Jr., whose father Teddy Yip owned the Theodore Racing Formula One team. They also ran the A1 Team Canada operation in 2007–08 and also assisted A1 Team Netherlands in 2008–09, the season in which Team Ireland won the championship title.

In 2010, Status Grand Prix competed in the inaugural GP3 Series finishing second in the team championship. Gary Anderson led the technical side of the team. At the end of the 2015 season, Status withdrew from the championship.

In 2014, Status Grand Prix acquired the Malaysian team of Tony Fernandes, EQ8 Caterham Racing, for the 2015 GP2 Series season, but participated in the last meeting of the 2014 GP2 Series season under the name of Caterham.

Status first raced officially in the 2015 GP2 Series season with Marlon Stockinger and Richie Stanaway as their drivers, with Oliver Rowland standing in for Stanaway in the final two rounds. Stanaway gave the team victories in the sprint races at Monaco and Sochi.

Status Grand Prix ended its participation in motor racing prior to the 2016 season.

== Series results ==
=== 24 Hours of Le Mans ===
Year	Entrant	No.	Car	Drivers	Class	Laps	Pos.	Class Pos.
2012	(Republic of Ireland) Status Grand Prix	30	Lola B12/80-Judd	(Netherlands) Yelmer Buurman (France) Romain Iannetta (United Kingdom) Alexander Sims	LMP2	239	DNF	DNF
2013	(Canada) HVM Status GP	30	Lola B12/80-Judd	(Canada) Tony Burgess (Switzerland) Jonathan Hirschi (United Kingdom) Johnny Mowlem	LMP2	153	DNF	DNF

=== GP2 Series ===
Year	Car	Drivers	Races	Wins	Poles	Fast laps	Points	D.C.	T.C.
2015	Dallara GP2/11-Mecachrome	(Philippines) Marlon Stöckinger	21	0	0	0	0	26th	8th
2015	Dallara GP2/11-Mecachrome	(New Zealand) Richie Stanaway	18	2	0	0	60	10th	8th
2015	Dallara GP2/11-Mecachrome	(United Kingdom) Oliver Rowland (Note: Oliver Rowland collected 3 points scored for MP Motorsport in 2015.)	3	0	0	0	3	21st	8th

==== In detail ====
(key) (Races in bold indicate pole position) (Races in italics indicate fastest lap)

Year	Chassis Engine Tyres	Drivers	1	2	3	4	5	6	7	8	9	10	11	12	13	14	15	16	17	18	19	20	21	22	T.C.	Points
2015	GP2/11; Mecachrome; **P**		BHR; FEA	BHR; SPR	CAT; FEA	CAT; SPR	MON; FEA	MON; SPR	RBR; FEA	RBR; SPR	SIL; FEA	SIL; SPR	HUN; FEA	HUN; SPR	SPA; FEA	SPA; SPR	MNZ; FEA	MNZ; SPR	SOC; FEA	SOC; SPR	BHR; FEA	BHR; SPR	YMC; FEA	YMC; SPR	8th	60
2015	GP2/11; Mecachrome; **P**	(Philippines) Marlon Stöckinger	11	19	Ret	20	19	18	19	19	19	22	19	23	17	19	Ret	19	Ret	Ret	13	19	18	C	8th	60
2015	GP2/11; Mecachrome; **P**	(New Zealand) Richie Stanaway	15	11	10	19	7	1	23	15	Ret	13	21	13	18	13	4	4	7	1					8th	60
2015	GP2/11; Mecachrome; **P**	(United Kingdom) Oliver Rowland																			22	Ret	15	C	8th	60

=== GP3 Series ===
Year	Car	Drivers	Races	Wins	Poles	Fast laps	Points	D.C.	T.C.
2010	Dallara GP3/10-Renault	(Canada) Robert Wickens	16	3	1	2	71	**2nd**	**2nd**
2010	Dallara GP3/10-Renault	(Russia) Ivan Lukashevich	16	0	0	0	0	32nd	**2nd**
2010	Dallara GP3/10-Renault	(Canada) Daniel Morad	16	1	0	1	15	12th	**2nd**
2011	Dallara GP3/10-Renault	(United Kingdom) Alexander Sims	16	1	0	2	34	6th	5th
2011	Dallara GP3/10-Renault	(Portugal) António Félix da Costa	16	1	0	0	16	13th	5th
2011	Dallara GP3/10-Renault	(Russia) Ivan Lukashevich	16	0	0	0	0	26th	5th
2012	Dallara GP3/10-Renault	(Philippines) Marlon Stöckinger	16	1	0	1	55	10th	6th
2012	Dallara GP3/10-Renault	(Japan) Kotaro Sakurai (Note: Kotaro Sakurai ran under a Japanese licence for the first two meetings of the season before changing to a Filipino one for Silverstone.)	6	0	0	0	0	24th	6th
2012	Dallara GP3/10-Renault	(United Kingdom) Alice Powell	16	0	0	0	1	19th	6th
2012	Dallara GP3/10-Renault	(United Kingdom) Lewis Williamson	8	0	0	0	11	17th	6th
2013	Dallara GP3/13-AER	(Sweden) Jimmy Eriksson	16	0	0	0	0	24th	9th
2013	Dallara GP3/13-AER	(Hong Kong) Adderly Fong	14	0	0	0	2	21st	9th
2013	Dallara GP3/13-AER	(United Kingdom) Josh Webster	16	0	0	0	0	28th	9th
2013	Dallara GP3/13-AER	(United Kingdom) Alexander Sims (Note: Alexander Sims scored 61 of his 77 points in 2013 with Carlin Motorsport.)	2	0	0	0	77	8th	9th
2014	Dallara GP3/13-AER	(United Kingdom) Nick Yelloly	18	1	0	0	127	6th	**3rd**
2014	Dallara GP3/13-AER	(New Zealand) Richie Stanaway	18	1	1	1	125	8th	**3rd**
2014	Dallara GP3/13-AER	(Mexico) Alfonso Celis Jr.	18	0	0	0	2	21st	**3rd**
2015	Dallara GP3/13-AER	(United Kingdom) Seb Morris	18	0	0	0	6	18th	8th
2015	Dallara GP3/13-AER	(Switzerland) Alex Fontana	18	0	0	0	16	16th	8th
2015	Dallara GP3/13-AER	(Thailand) Sandy Stuvik	18	0	0	0	7	17th	8th

==== In detail ====
(key) (Races in bold indicate pole position) (Races in italics indicate fastest lap)

Year	Chassis Engine Tyres	Drivers	1	2	3	4	5	6	7	8	9	10	11	12	13	14	15	16	17	18	T.C.	Points
2010	GP3/10; Renault; **P**		CAT; FEA	CAT; SPR	IST; FEA	IST; SPR	VAL; FEA	VAL; SPR	SIL; FEA	SIL; SPR	HOC; FEA	HOC; SPR	HUN; FEA	HUN; SPR	SPA; FEA	SPA; SPR	MNZ; FEA	MNZ; SPR			2nd	86
2010	GP3/10; Renault; **P**	(Canada) Robert Wickens	2	4	11	21	2	16	9	5	1	5	4	2	**1**	11	2	1			2nd	86
2010	GP3/10; Renault; **P**	(Russia) Ivan Lukashevich	19	19	19	27	16	25	19	Ret	17	13	25	18	Ret	13	19	14			2nd	86
2010	GP3/10; Renault; **P**	(Canada) Daniel Morad	Ret	22	5	5	19	12	7	1	Ret	9	21	12	Ret	16	9	7			2nd	86
2011	GP3/10; Renault; **P**		IST; FEA	IST; SPR	CAT; FEA	CAT; SPR	VAL; FEA	VAL; SPR	SIL; FEA	SIL; SPR	NÜR; FEA	NÜR; SPR	HUN; FEA	HUN; SPR	SPA; FEA	SPA; SPR	MNZ; FEA	MNZ; SPR			5th	50
2011	GP3/10; Renault; **P**	(United Kingdom) Alexander Sims	8	1	Ret	Ret	6	2	2	3	12	2	DSQ	9	Ret	Ret	21^{†}	Ret			5th	50
2011	GP3/10; Renault; **P**	(Portugal) António Félix da Costa	5	4	12	17	Ret	20^{†}	19	9	28	Ret	11	6	Ret	11	7	1			5th	50
2011	GP3/10; Renault; **P**	(Russia) Ivan Lukashevich	14	24	17	13	Ret	Ret	18	24	11	18	28	23	10	8	Ret	Ret			5th	50
2012	GP3/10; Renault; **P**		CAT; FEA	CAT; SPR	MON; FEA	MON; SPR	VAL; FEA	VAL; SPR	SIL; FEA	SIL; SPR	HOC; FEA	HOC; SPR	HUN; FEA	HUN; SPR	SPA; FEA	SPA; SPR	MNZ; FEA	MNZ; SPR			6th	67
2012	GP3/10; Renault; **P**	(Philippines) Marlon Stöckinger	2	19	8	1	19	11	16	Ret	16	11	9	13	14	16	7	4			6th	67
2012	GP3/10; Renault; **P**	(Japan) Kotaro Sakurai	18	12	13	20			15	13											6th	67
2012	GP3/10; Renault; **P**	(United Kingdom) Lewis Williamson									13	Ret	10	5	8	7	19	Ret			6th	67
2012	GP3/10; Renault; **P**	(United Kingdom) Alice Powell	Ret	11	11	22	18	Ret	17	Ret	19	Ret	19	20	18	12	12	8			6th	67
2013	GP3/13; AER; **P**		CAT; FEA	CAT; SPR	VAL; FEA	VAL; SPR	SIL; FEA	SIL; SPR	NÜR; FEA	NÜR; SPR	HUN; FEA	HUN; SPR	SPA; FEA	SPA; SPR	MNZ; FEA	MNZ; SPR	YMC; FEA	YMC; SPR			9th	18
2013	GP3/13; AER; **P**	(Sweden) Jimmy Eriksson	19	Ret	18	16	18	21^{†}	Ret	18	13	12	17	15	13	Ret	23	26			9th	18
2013	GP3/13; AER; **P**	(Hong Kong) Adderly Fong	23	11	Ret	Ret	9	Ret			20	17	Ret	16	19	20^{†}	17	21			9th	18
2013	GP3/13; AER; **P**	(United Kingdom) Alexander Sims							8	2											9th	18
2013	GP3/13; AER; **P**	(United Kingdom) Josh Webster	Ret	Ret	17	18	16	16	Ret	Ret	21	DSQ	Ret	18	Ret	16	21	22			9th	18
2014	GP3/13; AER; **P**		CAT; FEA	CAT; SPR	RBR; FEA	RBR; SPR	SIL; FEA	SIL; SPR	HOC; FEA	HOC; SPR	HUN; FEA	HUN; SPR	SPA; FEA	SPA; SPR	MNZ; FEA	MNZ; SPR	SOC; FEA	SOC; SPR	YMC; FEA	YMC; SPR	3rd	254
2014	GP3/13; AER; **P**	(United Kingdom) Nick Yelloly	9	7	7	5	5	2	4	5	2	11	3	5	10	5	9	6	8	1	3rd	254
2014	GP3/13; AER; **P**	(New Zealand) Richie Stanaway	3	4	4	3	7	1	13	7	**1**	6	7	2	9	Ret	12	Ret	12	7	3rd	254
2014	GP3/13; AER; **P**	(Mexico) Alfonso Celis Jr.	18	Ret	Ret	19	16	10	Ret	23^{†}	16	22	12	15	16	Ret	16	7	16	Ret	3rd	254
2015	GP3/13; AER; **P**		CAT; FEA	CAT; SPR	RBR; FEA	RBR; SPR	SIL; FEA	SIL; SPR	HUN; FEA	HUN; SPR	SPA; FEA	SPA; SPR	MNZ; FEA	MNZ; SPR	SOC; FEA	SOC; SPR	BHR; FEA	BHR; SPR	YMC; FEA	YMC; SPR	8th	29
2015	GP3/13; AER; **P**	(United Kingdom) Seb Morris	Ret	24	19	5	15	12	12	12	Ret	14	DSQ	Ret	14	10	16	Ret	13	15	8th	29
2015	GP3/13; AER; **P**	(Switzerland) Alex Fontana	9	16	10	6	19	18	14	13	10	6	8	16	19	11	19	19	15	13	8th	29
2015	GP3/13; AER; **P**	(Thailand) Sandy Stuvik	18	17	7	Ret	22	20	22	14	Ret	17	11	8	16	17	13	Ret	17	16	8th	29

=== A1 Grand Prix ===
A1 Grand Prix Results
Year	Car	Team	Drivers	Wins	Poles	Fast laps	Points	T.C.
2007–08	Lola A1GP-Zytek	(Republic of Ireland) A1 Team Ireland	Ralph Firman · Adam Carroll	1	0	1	94	6th
2007–08	Lola A1GP-Zytek	A1 Team Canada	James Hinchcliffe · Robert Wickens	1	2	1	75	9th
2008–09	A1GP-Ferrari	(Republic of Ireland) A1 Team Ireland	Adam Carroll	5	6	5	112	1st

== Timeline ==
Former series
A1 Grand Prix	2007–2009
GP3 Series	2010–2015
European Le Mans Series	2012
GP2 Series	2015
