= 2015 Bahrain 2nd GP2 Series round =

Motor racing competition

2015 Bahrain 2nd GP2 round
Round details
- Round 10 of 11 rounds in the 2015 GP2 Series
- Layout of the Bahrain International Circuit
- Location: Bahrain International Circuit, Sakhir, Bahrain
- Course: Permanent racing facility 5.406 km (3.359 mi)

GP2 Series

Feature race
- Date: 20 November 2015
- Laps: 32

Pole position
Driver	(France) Pierre Gasly	DAMS
- Time: 1:39.572

Podium
First	(Belgium) Stoffel Vandoorne	ART Grand Prix
Second	(Japan) Nobuharu Matsushita	ART Grand Prix
Third	(New Zealand) Mitch Evans	Russian Time

Fastest lap
Driver	(Belgium) Stoffel Vandoorne	ART Grand Prix
- Time: 1:43.166 (on lap 23)

Sprint race
- Date: 21 November 2015
- Laps: 23

Podium
First	(New Zealand) Mitch Evans	Russian Time
Second	(Belgium) Stoffel Vandoorne	ART Grand Prix
Third	(United Kingdom) Alex Lynn	DAMS

Fastest lap
Driver	(United Kingdom) Alex Lynn	DAMS
- Time: 1:44.094 (on lap 4)

The 2015 Bahrain 2nd GP2 Series round was a GP2 Series motor race held on November 20 and 21, 2015 at Bahrain International Circuit, Bahrain. It was the tenth and penultimate round of the 2015 GP2 Series. The first Bahrain round was held in April. The race supported the 2015 6 Hours of Bahrain.

== Classification ==
=== Qualifying ===
Pos	No	Driver	Team	Time	Gap	Grid
1	1	(France) Pierre Gasly	DAMS	1:39.572		1
2	5	(Belgium) Stoffel Vandoorne	ART Grand Prix	1:39.612	+0.040	2
3	11	(Italy) Raffaele Marciello	Trident	1:39.648	+0.076	3
4	2	(United Kingdom) Alex Lynn	DAMS	1:39.661	+0.089	4
5	7	(United Kingdom) Jordan King	Racing Engineering	1:39.902	+0.330	5
6	21	(France) Norman Nato	Arden International	1:40.004	+0.432	6
7	9	(New Zealand) Mitch Evans	Russian Time	1:40.027	+0.455	7
8	6	(Japan) Nobuharu Matsushita	ART Grand Prix	1:40.079	+0.507	8
9	8	(United States) Alexander Rossi	Racing Engineering	1:40.141	+0.569	9
10	14	(France) Arthur Pic	Campos Racing	1:40.176	+0.604	10
11	15	(Indonesia) Rio Haryanto	Campos Racing	1:40.212	+0.640	11
12	10	(Russia) Artem Markelov	Russian Time	1:40.354	+0.782	12
13	17	(Austria) René Binder	MP Motorsport	1:40.367	+0.795	13
14	18	(Russia) Sergey Sirotkin	Rapax	1:40.539	+0.967	14
15	26	(France) Nathanaël Berthon	Daiko Team Lazarus	1:40.571	+0.999	15
16	27	(Spain) Sergio Canamasas	Daiko Team Lazarus	1:40.588	+1.016	16
17	22	(Philippines) Marlon Stöckinger	Status Grand Prix	1:40.650	+1.078	17
18	23	(United Kingdom) Oliver Rowland	Status Grand Prix	1:40.720	+1.148	18
19	3	(United Kingdom) Dean Stoneman	Carlin	1:41.106	+1.534	19
20	16	(Canada) Nicholas Latifi	MP Motorsport	1:41.145	+1.573	20
21	12	(Netherlands) Daniël de Jong	Trident	1:41.208	+1.636	21
22	20	(Brazil) André Negrão	Arden International	1:41.432	+1.860	22
23	19	(Sweden) Gustav Malja	Rapax	1:41.775	+2.203	23
24	4	(Indonesia) Sean Gelael	Carlin	1:42.840	+3.268	24

=== Feature Race ===
Pos	No	Driver	Team	Laps	Time/Retired	Grid	Points
1	5	(Belgium) Stoffel Vandoorne	ART Grand Prix	32	57:15.184	2	25+2
2	6	(Japan) Nobuharu Matsushita	ART Grand Prix	32	+13.526	8	18
3	9	(New Zealand) Mitch Evans	Russian Time	32	+17.617	7	15
4	11	(Italy) Raffaele Marciello	Trident	32	+20.494	3	12
5	18	(Russia) Sergey Sirotkin	Rapax	32	+21.924	14	10
6	1	(France) Pierre Gasly	DAMS	32	+22.622	1	8+3
7	15	(Indonesia) Rio Haryanto	Campos Racing	32	+26.972	11	6
8	2	(United Kingdom) Alex Lynn	DAMS	32	+30.590	4	4
9	7	(United Kingdom) Jordan King	Racing Engineering	32	+31.312	5	2
10	14	(France) Arthur Pic	Campos Racing	32	+41.514	10	1
11	26	(France) Nathanaël Berthon	Daiko Team Lazarus	32	+43.621	15	
12	27	(Spain) Sergio Canamasas	Daiko Team Lazarus	32	+45.597	16	
13	22	(Philippines) Marlon Stöckinger	Status Grand Prix	32	+47.319	17	
14	10	(Russia) Artem Markelov	Russian Time	32	+56.728	12	
15	16	(Canada) Nicholas Latifi	MP Motorsport	32	+49.854	20	
16	19	(Sweden) Gustav Malja	Rapax	32	+57.380	23	
17	20	(Brazil) André Negrão	Arden International	32	+59.439	22	
18	8	(United States) Alexander Rossi	Racing Engineering	32	+59.845	9	
19	12	(Netherlands) Daniël de Jong	Trident	32	+1:00.613	21	
20	17	(Austria) René Binder	MP Motorsport	32	+1:00.700	13	
21	3	(United Kingdom) Dean Stoneman	Carlin	32	+1:08.684	19	
22	23	(United Kingdom) Oliver Rowland	Status Grand Prix	32	+1:11.829	18	
23	4	(Indonesia) Sean Gelael	Carlin	31	+1 lap	24	
24	21	(France) Norman Nato	Arden International	31	+1 lap	6	

=== Sprint Race ===
Pos	No	Driver	Team	Laps	Time/Retired	Grid	Points
1	9	(New Zealand) Mitch Evans	Russian Time	23	42:51.663	6	15
2	5	(Belgium) Stoffel Vandoorne	ART Grand Prix	23	+1.863	8	12
3	2	(United Kingdom) Alex Lynn	DAMS	23	+17.489	1	10+2
4	18	(Russia) Sergey Sirotkin	Rapax	23	+20.154	4	8
5	11	(Italy) Raffaele Marciello	Trident	23	+21.026	5	6
6	7	(United Kingdom) Jordan King	Racing Engineering	23	+21.661	9	4
7	1	(France) Pierre Gasly	DAMS	23	+22.857	3	2
8	10	(Russia) Artem Markelov	Russian Time	23	+26.686	14	1
9	8	(United States) Alexander Rossi	Racing Engineering	23	+27.295	18	
10	21	(France) Norman Nato	Arden International	23	+34.387	24	
11	16	(Canada) Nicholas Latifi	MP Motorsport	23	+37.588	15	
12	3	(United Kingdom) Dean Stoneman	Carlin	23	+42.637	21	
13	19	(Sweden) Gustav Malja	Rapax	23	+45.771	16	
14	12	(Netherlands) Daniël de Jong	Trident	23	+47.088	19	
15	4	(Indonesia) Sean Gelael	Carlin	23	+48.410	23	
16	14	(France) Arthur Pic	Campos Racing	23	+48.602	10	
17	27	(Spain) Sergio Canamasas	Daiko Team Lazarus	23	+59.866	12	
18	15	(Indonesia) Rio Haryanto	Campos Racing	23	+59.942	2	
19	22	(Philippines) Marlon Stöckinger	Status Grand Prix	23	+1:01.931	13	
20	20	(Brazil) André Negrão	Arden International	23	+1:09.902	17	
Ret	26	(France) Nathanaël Berthon	Daiko Team Lazarus	17	Retired	11	
Ret	17	(Austria) René Binder	MP Motorsport	1	Retired	20	
Ret	23	(United Kingdom) Oliver Rowland	Status Grand Prix	0	Retired	22	
Ret	6	(Japan) Nobuharu Matsushita	ART Grand Prix	0	Retired	7	

== See also ==
- 2015 6 Hours of Bahrain
- 2015 Bahrain GP3 Series round

Previous round: 2015 Sochi GP2 Series round	GP2 Series; 2015 season	Next round: 2015 Yas Marina GP2 Series round
Previous round: 2015 Bahrain GP2 Series round (April)	Bahrain GP2 round	Next round: 2017 Sakhir Formula 2 round
