= Bahrain GP2 round =

Bahrain GP2 Series round

GP2 Series
- Venue: Bahrain International Circuit
- Location: Sakhir, Bahrain
- First race: 2005
- Last race: 2015
- Most wins (driver): (Italy) Davide Valsecchi (3)
- Most wins (team): (France) DAMS (France) ART Grand Prix (both 5)
- Lap record: 1:43.166 ( (Belgium) Stoffel Vandoorne, Dallara GP2/11, 2015)

Bahrain GP2 Asia Series round
GP2 Asia Series
- First race: 2008
- Last race: 2010
- Most wins (driver): (Japan) Kamui Kobayashi (2)
- Most wins (team): (France) DAMS (United Kingdom) Arden International (both 2)
- Lap record: 1:43.604 ( (Japan) Kamui Kobayashi, Dallara GP2/05, 2009)

2010 (Note: Endurance circuit layout of the Bahrain International Circuit, which held GP2 Asia Series round in March 2010.)
- Lap record: 2:09.787 ( (France) Jules Bianchi, Dallara GP2/05, 2010)

The Bahrain GP2 round was a GP2 Series race that is run on the Bahrain International Circuit track in Sakhir, Bahrain.

== Winners ==
A green background indicates an event which was part of the GP2 Asia Series event.

Year	Race	Driver	Team	Report
2005	Feature	(Germany) Nico Rosberg	ART Grand Prix	Report
2005	Sprint	(Germany) Nico Rosberg	ART Grand Prix	Report
2007	Feature	(Italy) Luca Filippi	Super Nova International	Report
2007	Sprint	(France) Nicolas Lapierre	DAMS	Report
2008	Feature	(France) Romain Grosjean	ART Grand Prix	Report
2008	Sprint	(Japan) Kamui Kobayashi	DAMS	Report
2009	Feature	(Japan) Kamui Kobayashi	DAMS	Report
2009	Sprint	(Mexico) Sergio Pérez	Barwa International Campos Team	Report
2009	Feature	(Brazil) Diego Nunes	Piquet GP	Report
2009	Sprint	(Brazil) Luiz Razia	Arden International Motorsport	Report
2010	Feature	(Italy) Davide Valsecchi	iSport International	Report
2010	Sprint	(France) Charles Pic	Arden International	Report
2010	Feature	(Italy) Luca Filippi	MalaysiaQi-Meritus.com	Report
2010	Sprint	(Italy) Giacomo Ricci	DPR	Report
2012	Feature	(Italy) Davide Valsecchi	DAMS	Report
2012	Sprint	(Italy) Davide Valsecchi	DAMS	Report
2012	Feature	(Italy) Davide Valsecchi	DAMS	Report
2012	Sprint	(France) Tom Dillmann	Rapax	Report
2013	Feature	(Switzerland) Fabio Leimer	Racing Engineering	Report
2013	Sprint	(United Kingdom) Sam Bird	Russian Time	Report
2014	Feature	(Belgium) Stoffel Vandoorne	ART Grand Prix	Report
2014	Sprint	(United Kingdom) Jolyon Palmer	DAMS	Report
2015	Feature	(Belgium) Stoffel Vandoorne	ART Grand Prix	Report
2015	Sprint	(Indonesia) Rio Haryanto	Campos Racing	Report
2015	Feature	(Belgium) Stoffel Vandoorne	ART Grand Prix	Report
2015	Sprint	(New Zealand) Mitch Evans	Russian Time	Report

== See also ==
- Bahrain Grand Prix
- Sakhir Formula 2 round
