= Robert Vișoiu =

Romanian racing driver (born 1996)

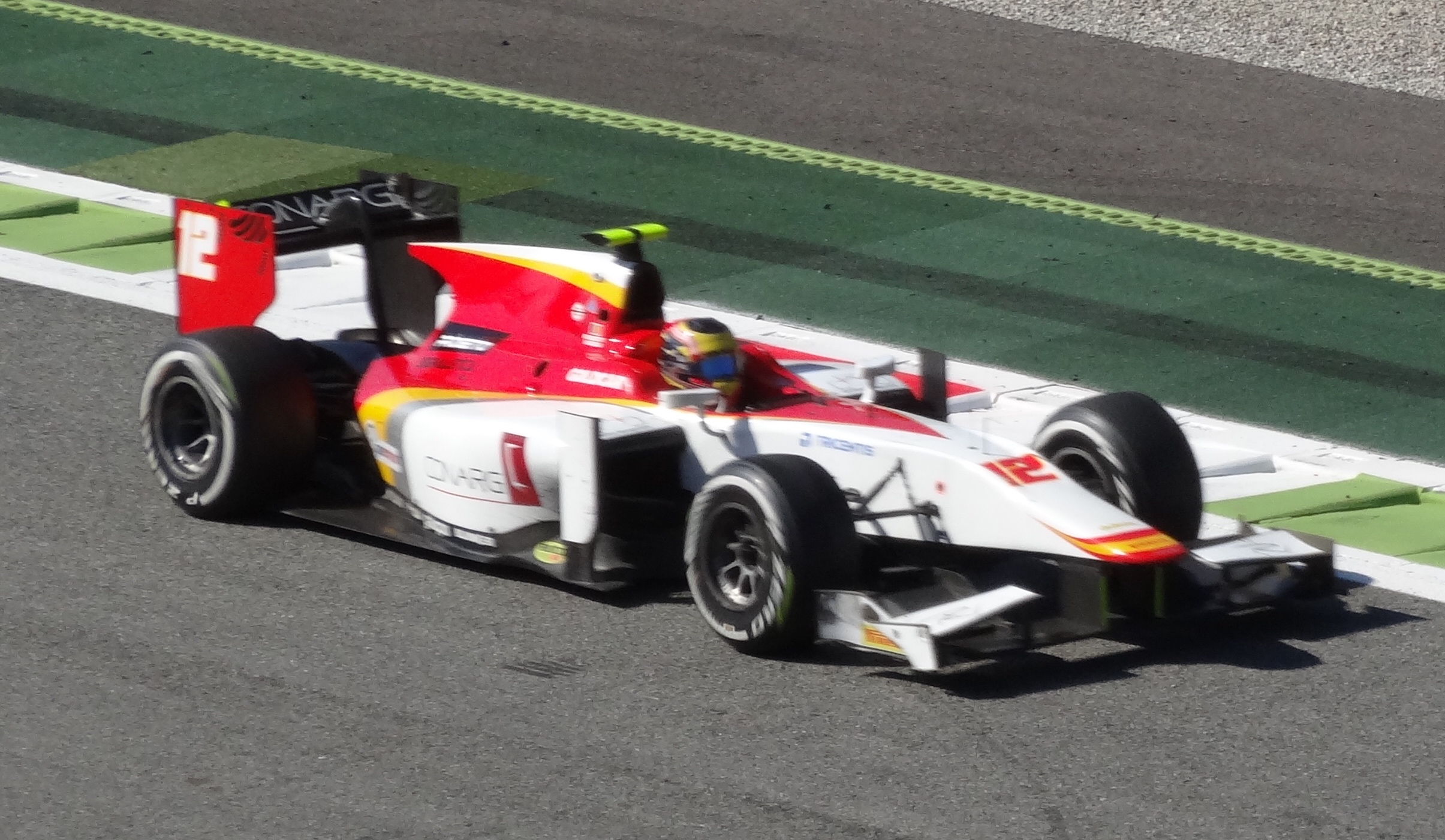
- Vișoiu in Monza, 2017
- Nationality: (Romania) Romanian
- Born: 10 February 1996 (age 30) Pitești, Romania

FIA Formula 2 Championship career
- Debut season: 2017
- Categorisation: FIA Silver
- Car number: 12
- Former teams: Campos Racing
- Starts: 14
- Wins: 0
- Podiums: 0
- Poles: 0
- Fastest laps: 0
- Best finish: 24th in 2017

Previous series
- 2015 2012-14 2013 2012 2011 2011: GP2 Series; GP3 Series; Auto GP; Italian Formula Three; Formula Abarth; Formula Pilota China

Robert Vișoiu (born 10 February 1996 in Pitești) is a Romanian racing driver. He currently competes in the Le Mans Cup, driving for TS Corse, and the International GT Open, driving for Team Motopark.

== Career ==
=== Karting ===
At the age of six, Vișoiu first sat behind the wheel of a kart, the beginning of his karting career. He raced primarily in his native Romania up to 2009, becoming a two-time champion in the Mini Class and champion in the KF3 category. In 2009, Vișoiu switched to International KF3 competitions.

=== Formula Abarth ===
In 2011, Vișoiu graduated to single-seaters, racing in the Formula Abarth series for Jenzer Motorsport. Race victory in Misano and another two podiums saw him finish on sixth position in the Italian series. In European Series, he finished on fourth place with two race victories, including win in series' finale at Circuit de Catalunya.

=== GP3 Series ===
Vișoiu continued his collaboration with Jenzer Motorsport into the GP3 Series in 2012. He finished the season fourteenth overall with twenty-four points, including a podium finish in Barcelona. In 2013, he raced for MW Arden alongside series debutants Daniil Kvyat and Carlos Sainz Jr. He finished eleventh in the standings, taking two sprint race wins. He continued with Arden in 2014, but struggled more than the previous season, finishing thirteen with just one podium.

=== Formula Three ===
Despite his GP3 commitments, Vișoiu also took part in the 2012 Italian Formula Three Championship with Ghinzani Arco Motorsport. He finished the season ninth overall, scoring two podiums at the Hungaroring and winning the sprint race at the Mugello Circuit round. Vișoiu did not take part in the Misano or Imola rounds, owing to clashes with the Silverstone and Spa-Francorchamps rounds of the GP3 Series season.

=== GP2 Series ===
Originally intending to leave motorsport to focus on his education, it was announced that Vișoiu would partake in the 2015 season, racing with Rapax. There he finished seventeenth overall, in sharp contrast to his third placed teammate Sergey Sirotkin.

=== FIA Formula 2 ===
After a year out of motorsport in 2016, Vișoiu was signed to Campos Racing from the Monaco round of the 2017 season onwards. However, Vișoiu departed the series and all forms of motorsport before the Jerez round, calling time on his racing career and subsequently being replaced by Álex Palou.

== Racing record ==
=== Career summary ===
Season	Series	Team	Races	Wins	Poles	F/Laps	Podiums	Points	Position
2011	Formula Abarth Italian Series	Jenzer Motorsport	14	1	0	0	3	69	6th
2011	Formula Abarth European Series	Jenzer Motorsport	14	2	0	0	3	81	4th
2011	Formula Pilota China	Jenzer Welsh Asia Racing	4	0	0	0	2	38	9th
2012	Italian Formula 3 European Series	Ghinzani Arco Motorsport	18	1	0	0	2	76	9th
2012	Italian Formula 3 Championship	Ghinzani Arco Motorsport	12	1	0	0	1	39	10th
2012	GP3 Series	Jenzer Motorsport	16	0	0	0	1	24	14th
2013	Auto GP	Team Ghinzani	16	0	0	0	2	67	8th
2013	GP3 Series	MW Arden	16	2	0	0	2	44	11th
2014	GP3 Series	Arden International	18	0	0	0	1	23	13th
2015	GP2 Series	Rapax	18	0	0	1	0	20	17th
2017	FIA Formula 2 Championship	Campos Racing	14	0	0	0	0	1	24th
2024	Ultimate Cup Series - Proto P3	TS Corse	1	0	0	0	1	15	24th
2025	International GT Open	Team Motopark	7	0	0	0	0	12	19th

=== Complete GP3 Series results ===
(key) (Races in bold indicate pole position) (Races in italics indicate fastest lap)

Year	Entrant	1	2	3	4	5	6	7	8	9	10	11	12	13	14	15	16	17	18	D.C.	Points
2012	Jenzer Motorsport	CAT; FEA; 8	CAT; SPR; 2	MON; FEA; 14	MON; SPR; 10	VAL; FEA; Ret	VAL; SPR; 12	SIL; FEA; 12	SIL; SPR; 5	HOC; FEA; DSQ	HOC; SPR; 12	HUN; FEA; 12	HUN; SPR; 22	SPA; FEA; 15	SPA; SPR; 13	MNZ; FEA; 14	MNZ; SPR; 7			14th	24
2013	MW Arden	CAT; FEA; 9	CAT; SPR; 19	VAL; FEA; 8	VAL; SPR; 1	SIL; FEA; 12	SIL; SPR; Ret	NÜR; FEA; 11	NÜR; SPR; 23	HUN; FEA; 8	HUN; SPR; 1	SPA; FEA; 9	SPA; SPR; 8	MNZ; FEA; Ret	MNZ; SPR; 10	YMC; FEA; 10	YMC; SPR; 11			11th	44
2014	Arden International	CAT; FEA; 13	CAT; SPR; 11	RBR; FEA; Ret	RBR; SPR; 14	SIL; FEA; 20	SIL; SPR; 13	HOC; FEA; 10	HOC; SPR; 9	HUN; FEA; 3	HUN; SPR; 5	SPA; FEA; Ret	SPA; SPR; 20	MNZ; FEA; 19	MNZ; SPR; 14	SOC; FEA; Ret	SOC; SPR; 10	YMC; FEA; 15	YMC; SPR; 8	13th	23

=== Complete Auto GP results ===
(key) (Races in bold indicate pole position) (Races in italics indicate fastest lap)

Year	Entrant	1	2	3	4	5	6	7	8	9	10	11	12	13	14	15	16	Pos	Points
2013	Ghinzani Motorsport	MNZ; 1; 3	MNZ; 2; 6	MAR; 1; 14†	MAR; 2; 4	HUN; 1; 15†	HUN; 2; 10	SIL; 1; 9	SIL; 2 Ret	MUG; 1 Ret	MUG; 2; 15†	NÜR; 1; 7	NÜR; 2; 12	DON; 1; 4	DON; 2; 11	BRN; 1; 3	BRN; 2 Ret	8th	67

=== Complete GP2 Series/FIA Formula 2 Championship results ===
(key) (Races in bold indicate pole position) (Races in italics indicate fastest lap)

Year	Entrant	1	2	3	4	5	6	7	8	9	10	11	12	13	14	15	16	17	18	19	20	21	22	DC	Points
2015	Rapax	BHR; FEA; 5	BHR; SPR; 7	CAT; FEA; 18	CAT; SPR; 23	MON; FEA; 15	MON; SPR; 13	RBR; FEA; 11	RBR; SPR; 9	SIL; FEA; 12	SIL; SPR; 11	HUN; FEA; 9	HUN; SPR; 7	SPA; FEA; 15	SPA; SPR; 16	MNZ; FEA; 9	MNZ; SPR; Ret	SOC; FEA; 17	SOC; SPR; 18	BHR; FEA	BHR; SPR	YMC; FEA	YMC; SPR	17th	20
2017	Campos Racing	BHR; FEA	BHR; SPR	CAT; FEA	CAT; SPR	MON; FEA; Ret	MON; SPR; 15	BAK; FEA; 15	BAK; SPR; 11	RBR; FEA; 11	RBR; SPR; 17†	SIL; FEA; 17	SIL; SPR; 11	HUN; FEA; Ret	HUN; SPR; Ret	SPA; FEA; 10	SPA; SPR; 16	MNZ; FEA; 16	MNZ; SPR; 19	JER; FEA	JER; SPR	YMC; FEA	YMC; SPR	24th	1

^{†} Driver did not finish the race, but was classified as he completed over 90% of the race distance.
