= Amberg (name) =

Amberg is a Bavarian, Austrian and Swiss German toponymic surname. The surname originated in Bavaria after the city Amberg, but can come from any of several places named Amberg. It may refer to:

- Ernst Julius Amberg (1871–1951), Swiss mathematician and mountain climber
- Hans Christian Amberg (1749–1815), Danish lexicographer
- Hans Christian Amberg (architect) (1837–1919), Danish architect
- Herman Amberg (1834–1902), Danish musician and composer
- Herman Amberg (educator) (1754–1837), Danish-Norwegian educator
- Hyman Amberg (c. 1902–1926), New York mobster
- Johan Amberg (1846–1928), Danish composer and violinist
- John Amberg (1929–2004), American football player
- Joseph C. Amberg (1892–1935), New York mobster
- Leo Amberg (1912–1999), Swiss professional road bicycle racer
- Louis Amberg (1897–1935), New York mobster
- Michael Amberg (1926–2001), British fencer
- Rob Amberg (born 1947), North Carolina photographer
- Wilhelm Amberg (1822–1899), German genre painter
- Zoël Amberg (born 1992), Swiss professional racing driver
