= 2011 Catalunya GP3 Series round =

Motor racing competition

(Spain) 2011 Catalunya GP3 round
Round details
- Round 2 of 8 rounds in the 2011 GP3 Series
- Circuit de Catalunya
- Location: Circuit de Catalunya; Montmeló, Spain
- Course: Permanent racing facility 4.665 km (2.892 mi)

GP3 Series

Race 1
- Date: 21 May 2011
- Laps: 16

Pole position
Driver	(New Zealand) Mitch Evans	MW Arden
- Time: 1:38.498

Podium
First	(New Zealand) Mitch Evans	MW Arden
Second	(United Kingdom) James Calado	Lotus ART
Third	(Finland) Aaro Vainio	Tech 1 Racing

Fastest lap
Driver	(Finland) Valtteri Bottas	Lotus ART
- Time: 1:41.633 (on lap 6)

Race 2
- Date: 22 May 2011
- Laps: 16

Podium
First	(Hungary) Tamás Pál Kiss	Tech 1 Racing
Second	(Netherlands) Nigel Melker	RSC Mücke Motorsport
Third	(United Kingdom) Dean Smith	Addax Team

Fastest lap
Driver	(Italy) Andrea Caldarelli	Tech 1 Racing
- Time: 1:40.548 (on lap 7)

The 2011 Catalunya GP3 Series round was the second round of the 2011 GP3 Series season. It was held on May 20–22, 2011 at Circuit de Catalunya, Montmeló, Spain, supporting the 2011 Spanish Grand Prix.

== Classification ==
=== Race 1 ===
Pos	No.	Driver	Team	Laps	Time/Retired	Grid	Points
1	26	(New Zealand) Mitch Evans	MW Arden	16	27:19.175	1	10+2
2	3	(United Kingdom) James Calado	Lotus ART	16	+1.885	4	8
3	17	(Finland) Aaro Vainio	Tech 1 Racing	16	+7.224	3	6
4	18	(Italy) Andrea Caldarelli	Tech 1 Racing	16	+7.432	2	5
5	7	(Switzerland) Nico Müller	Jenzer Motorsport	16	+7.751	6	4
6	31	(Netherlands) Nigel Melker	RSC Mücke Motorsport	16	+8.574	5	3
7	25	(United Kingdom) Dean Smith	Addax Team	16	+8.790	8	2
8	19	(Hungary) Tamás Pál Kiss	Tech 1 Racing	16	+10.328	7	1
9	9	(Italy) Vittorio Ghirelli	Jenzer Motorsport	16	+11.930	12	
10	2	(Finland) Valtteri Bottas	Lotus ART	16	+13.495	9	1
11	10	(United Kingdom) Adrian Quaife-Hobbs	Marussia Manor Racing	16	+15.294	11	
12	5	(Portugal) António Félix da Costa	Status Grand Prix	16	+20.311	15	
13	24	(Colombia) Gabriel Chaves	Addax Team	16	+20.611	17	
14	28	(United Kingdom) Lewis Williamson	MW Arden	16	+21.230	18	
15	1	(Brazil) Pedro Nunes	Lotus ART	16	+24.071	16	
16	22	(Switzerland) Zoël Amberg	ATECH CRS GP	16	+26.521	22	
17	6	(Russia) Ivan Lukashevich	Status Grand Prix	16	+27.108	20	
18	30	(Denmark) Michael Christensen	RSC Mücke Motorsport	16	+27.770	29	
19	12	(Finland) Matias Laine	Marussia Manor Racing	16	+32.782	19	
20	11	(Indonesia) Rio Haryanto	Marussia Manor Racing	16	+33.320	21	
21	14	(United States) Conor Daly	Carlin	16	+36.714	23	
22	29	(United Kingdom) Luciano Bacheta	RSC Mücke Motorsport	16	+37.458	28	
23	16	(Brazil) Leonardo Cordeiro	Carlin	16	+44.098	26	
24	15	(Canada) Daniel Morad	Carlin	16	+44.886	25	
25	21	(United Kingdom) Nick Yelloly	ATECH CRS GP	16	+49.737	10	
26	20	(Philippines) Marlon Stöckinger	ATECH CRS GP	16	+51.623	30	
27	27	(Switzerland) Simon Trummer	MW Arden	15	+1 lap	27	
Ret	23	(New Zealand) Dominic Storey	Addax Team	9	Retired	24	
Ret	4	(United Kingdom) Alexander Sims	Status Grand Prix	3	Retired	14	
Ret	8	(Russia) Maxim Zimin	Jenzer Motorsport	0	Retired	13	
Fastest lap: Valtteri Bottas (Lotus ART) 1:41.633 (lap 6)

=== Race 2 ===
Pos	No.	Driver	Team	Laps	Time/Retired	Grid	Points
1	19	(Hungary) Tamás Pál Kiss	Tech 1 Racing	16	31:08.280	1	6
2	31	(Netherlands) Nigel Melker	RSC Mücke Motorsport	16	+1.294	3	5
3	25	(United Kingdom) Dean Smith	Addax Team	16	+2.657	2	4
4	18	(Italy) Andrea Caldarelli	Tech 1 Racing	16	+4.055	5	3+1
5	26	(New Zealand) Mitch Evans	MW Arden	16	+5.671	8	2
6	24	(Colombia) Gabriel Chaves	Addax Team	16	+7.122	13	1
7	2	(Finland) Valtteri Bottas	Lotus ART	16	+9.341	10	
8	9	(Italy) Vittorio Ghirelli	Jenzer Motorsport	16	+10.615	9	
9	28	(United Kingdom) Lewis Williamson	MW Arden	16	+11.830	14	
10	22	(Switzerland) Zoël Amberg	ATECH CRS GP	16	+14.205	16	
11	11	(Indonesia) Rio Haryanto	Marussia Manor Racing	16	+15.542	20	
12	30	(Denmark) Michael Christensen	RSC Mücke Motorsport	16	+17.398	18	
13	6	(Russia) Ivan Lukashevich	Status Grand Prix	16	+18.038	17	
14	15	(Canada) Daniel Morad	Carlin	16	+19.171	24	
15	16	(Brazil) Leonardo Cordeiro	Carlin	16	+19.733	23	
16	29	(United Kingdom) Luciano Bacheta	RSC Mücke Motorsport	16	+22.275	22	
17	5	(Portugal) António Félix da Costa	Status Grand Prix	16	+22.785	12	
18	21	(United Kingdom) Nick Yelloly	ATECH CRS GP	16	+29.727	25	
19	8	(Russia) Maxim Zimin	Jenzer Motorsport	16	+30.180	30	
20	17	(Finland) Aaro Vainio	Tech 1 Racing	16	+31.256	6	
21	3	(United Kingdom) James Calado	Lotus ART	16	+43.066	7	
22	14	(United States) Conor Daly	Carlin	16	+46.796	21	
23	10	(United Kingdom) Adrian Quaife-Hobbs	Marussia Manor Racing	16	+50.892	11	
24	12	(Finland) Matias Laine	Marussia Manor Racing	15	+1 lap	19	
25	27	(Switzerland) Simon Trummer	MW Arden	14	+2 laps	27	
26	1	(Brazil) Pedro Nunes	Lotus ART	14	+2 laps	15	
27	23	(New Zealand) Dominic Storey	Addax Team	14	+2 laps	28	
Ret	4	(United Kingdom) Alexander Sims	Status Grand Prix	0	Collision	29	
Ret	7	(Switzerland) Nico Müller	Jenzer Motorsport	0	Collision	4	
Ret	20	(Philippines) Marlon Stöckinger	ATECH CRS GP	0	Collision	26	
Fastest lap: Andrea Caldarelli (Tech 1 Racing) 1:40.548 (lap 7)

== Standings after the round ==
Drivers' Championship standings

Pos	Driver	Points
1	(Netherlands) Nigel Melker	22
2	(Italy) Andrea Caldarelli	20
3	(New Zealand) Mitch Evans	17
4	(United Kingdom) Alexander Sims	8
5	(United Kingdom) James Calado	8

Teams' Championship standings

Pos	Team	Points
1	(France) Tech 1 Racing	33
2	(Germany) RSC Mücke Motorsport	29
3	(Australia) MW Arden	17
4	(Republic of Ireland) Status Grand Prix	15
5	(France) Lotus ART	14

- Note: Only the top five positions are included for both sets of standings.

== See also ==
- 2011 Spanish Grand Prix
- 2011 Catalunya GP2 Series round

Previous round: 2011 Istanbul Park GP3 Series round	GP3 Series; 2011 season	Next round: 2011 Valencia GP3 Series round
Previous round: 2010 Catalunya GP3 Series round	Spanish GP3 round	Next round: 2012 Catalunya GP3 Series round
