= 2013 Yas Marina GP3 Series round =

(United Arab Emirates) 2013 Yas Marina GP3 round
Round details
- Round 8 of 8 rounds in the 2013 GP3 Series
- Layout of the Yas Marina Circuit
- Location: Yas Marina Circuit, Abu Dhabi, United Arab Emirates
- Course: Permanent racing facility 5.554 km (3.451 mi)

GP3 Series

Race 1
- Date: 2 November 2013
- Laps: 14

Pole position
| Driver | (Russia) Daniil Kvyat | MW Arden |
- Time: 1:55.473

Podium
| First | (Russia) Daniil Kvyat | MW Arden |
| Second | (United Kingdom) Alexander Sims | Carlin |
| Third | (United Kingdom) Nick Yelloly | Carlin |

Fastest lap
| Driver | (Russia) Daniil Kvyat | MW Arden |
- Time: 1:57.059 (on lap 5)

Race 2
- Date: 3 November 2013
- Laps: 14

Podium
| First | (Cyprus) Tio Ellinas | Marussia Manor Racing |
| Second | (United Kingdom) Dean Stoneman | Koiranen GP |
| Third | (United States) Conor Daly | ART Grand Prix |

Fastest lap
| Driver | (United Kingdom) Nick Yelloly | Carlin |
- Time: 1:58.487 (on lap 11)

The 2013 Yas Marina GP3 Series round was a GP3 Series motor race held on November 2 and 3, 2013 at Yas Marina Circuit, Abu Dhabi. It was the last weekend of the 2013 GP3 Series. The race supported the 2013 Abu Dhabi Grand Prix.

== Classification ==
=== Summary ===
Three teams changed their lineups before the final race weekend. Dean Stoneman replaced Aaro Vainio at Koiranen GP; it was his first race in single-seaters since 2010, when he was diagnosed with cancer. Robert Cregan, whose father owned Yas Marina Circuit at the time, replaced David Fumanelli at Trident. Alice Powell replaced Melville McKee at Bamboo Engineering, with the team running an all-female lineup, as Lewis Williamson as was not present and was not replaced.

Daniil Kvyat took pole position, bringing the championship points gap to Facu Regalia down to just three points. Kvyat led every lap and set the fastest lap, winning the race with an almost five second gap to Alexander Sims. Regalia crossed the line in seventh, but was given a twenty second time penalty for not respecting yellow flags, dropping him out of the points. Because of this, Kvyat took the championship title with one race remaining.

Patrick Kujala started on reverse grid pole, but was overtaken at the start by Tio Ellinas and Stoneman. Ellinas struggled with tyre wear towards the end of the race but held the lead, taking his second win of the season.

=== Qualifying ===
| Pos | No | Driver | Team | Time | Grid |
|---|---|---|---|---|---|
| 1 | 6 | (Russia) Daniil Kvyat | MW Arden | 1:55.473 | 1 |
| 2 | 8 | (United Kingdom) Nick Yelloly | Carlin | 1:55.753 | 2 |
| 3 | 28 | (Estonia) Kevin Korjus | Koiranen GP | 1:55.785 | 3 |
| 4 | 9 | (United Kingdom) Alexander Sims | Carlin | 1:56.221 | 4 |
| 5 | 3 | (United Kingdom) Jack Harvey | ART Grand Prix | 1:56.265 | 5 |
| 6 | 4 | (Spain) Carlos Sainz Jr. | MW Arden | 1:56.392 | 6 |
| 7 | 1 | (United States) Conor Daly | ART Grand Prix | 1:56.442 | 7 |
| 8 | 11 | (Switzerland) Patric Niederhauser | Jenzer Motorsport | 1:56.487 | 8 |
| 9 | 27 | (United Kingdom) Dean Stoneman | Koiranen GP | 1:56.560 | 9 |
| 10 | 2 | (Argentina) Facu Regalia | ART Grand Prix | 1:56.722 | 10 |
| 11 | 23 | (Italy) Giovanni Venturini | Trident Racing | 1:56.730 | 11 |
| 12 | 14 | (Cyprus) Tio Ellinas | Marussia Manor Racing | 1:56.928 | 12 |
| 13 | 17 | (Sweden) Jimmy Eriksson | Status Grand Prix | 1:57.057 | 18^{1} |
| 14 | 5 | (Romania) Robert Vișoiu | MW Arden | 1:57.095 | 13 |
| 15 | 16 | (United Kingdom) Dino Zamparelli | Marussia Manor Racing | 1:57.281 | 14 |
| 16 | 12 | (Switzerland) Alex Fontana | Jenzer Motorsport | 1:57.420 | 15 |
| 17 | 25 | (San Marino) Emanuele Zonzini | Trident Racing | 1:57.445 | 16 |
| 18 | 26 | (Finland) Patrick Kujala | Koiranen GP | 1:57.667 | 17 |
| 19 | 7 | (Macau) Luís Sá Silva | Carlin | 1:57.967 | 19 |
| 20 | 24 | (Republic of Ireland) Robert Cregan | Trident Racing | 1:58.040 | 20 |
| 21 | 19 | (United Kingdom) Josh Webster | Status Grand Prix | 1:58.115 | 21 |
| 22 | 18 | (Hong Kong) Adderly Fong | Status Grand Prix | 1:58.328 | 22 |
| 23 | 10 | (Venezuela) Samin Gómez | Jenzer Motorsport | 1:58.522 | 25^{1} |
| 24 | 21 | (United Kingdom) Alice Powell | Bamboo Engineering | 1:58.553 | 26 |
| 25 | 15 | (United Kingdom) Ryan Cullen | Marussia Manor Racing | 1:58.804 | 24^{2} |
| 26 | 22 | (Spain) Carmen Jordá | Bamboo Engineering | 1:59.400 | 23 |

- ^1 Jimmy Eriksson and Samin Gómez were both given a five-place grid penalty for causing a collision in the previous round.
- ^2 Ryan Cullen was given a ten-place grid penalty for causing a collision in the previous round.

=== Feature Race ===
| Pos | No | Driver | Team | Laps | Time/Retired | Grid | Points |
|---|---|---|---|---|---|---|---|
| 1 | 6 | (Russia) Daniil Kvyat | MW Arden | 14 | 29:40.145 | 1 | 31 (25+4+2) |
| 2 | 9 | (United Kingdom) Alexander Sims | Carlin | 14 | +4.677 | 4 | 18 |
| 3 | 8 | (United Kingdom) Nick Yelloly | Carlin | 14 | +7.053 | 2 | 15 |
| 4 | 1 | (United States) Conor Daly | ART Grand Prix | 14 | +7.411 | 7 | 12 |
| 5 | 3 | (United Kingdom) Jack Harvey | ART Grand Prix | 14 | +8.333 | 5 | 10 |
| 6 | 27 | (United Kingdom) Dean Stoneman | Koiranen GP | 14 | +14.900 | 9 | 8 |
| 7 | 14 | (Cyprus) Tio Ellinas | Marussia Manor Racing | 14 | +18.235 | 12 | 6 |
| 8 | 26 | (Finland) Patrick Kujala | Koiranen GP | 14 | +26.882 | 18 | 4 |
| 9 | 16 | (United Kingdom) Dino Zamparelli | Marussia Manor Racing | 14 | +33.215 | 14 | 2 |
| 10 | 5 | (Romania) Robert Vișoiu | MW Arden | 14 | +34.100 | 13 | 1 |
| 11 | 23 | (Italy) Giovanni Venturini | Trident Racing | 14 | +34.781 | 11 | |
| 12 | 28 | (Estonia) Kevin Korjus | Koiranen GP | 14 | +35.528 | 3 | |
| 13 | 12 | (Switzerland) Alex Fontana | Jenzer Motorsport | 14 | +36.041 | 15 | |
| 14 | 25 | (San Marino) Emanuele Zonzini | Trident Racing | 14 | +36.045 | 16 | |
| 15 | 2 | (Argentina) Facu Regalia | ART Grand Prix | 14 | +36.957 | 10 | |
| 16 | 24 | (Republic of Ireland) Robert Cregan | Trident Racing | 14 | +38.133 | 20 | |
| 17 | 18 | (Hong Kong) Adderly Fong | Status Grand Prix | 14 | +39.707 | 22 | |
| 18 | 7 | (Macau) Luís Sá Silva | Carlin | 14 | +40.829 | 19 | |
| 19 | 21 | (United Kingdom) Alice Powell | Bamboo Engineering | 14 | +41.277 | 26 | |
| 20 | 15 | (United Kingdom) Ryan Cullen | Marussia Manor Racing | 14 | +44.591 | 25 | |
| 21 | 19 | (United Kingdom) Josh Webster | Status Grand Prix | 14 | +49.911 | 21 | |
| 22 | 10 | (Venezuela) Samin Gómez | Jenzer Motorsport | 14 | +1:30.470 | 24 | |
| 23 | 17 | (Sweden) Jimmy Eriksson | Status Grand Prix | 13 | +1 lap | 18 | |
| Ret | 11 | (Switzerland) Patric Niederhauser | Jenzer Motorsport | 4 | Retired | 8 | |
| Ret | 22 | (Spain) Carmen Jordá | Bamboo Engineering | 0 | Retired | 23 | |
| DSQ | 4 | (Spain) Carlos Sainz Jr. | MW Arden | 14 | Disqualified^{1} | 6 | |
Fastest lap: Daniil Kvyat (MW Arden) — 1:57.059 (on lap 5)

- ^1 Carlos Sainz Jr. originally finished in ninth place, but was disqualified for causing a collision.

=== Sprint Race ===
| Pos | No | Driver | Team | Laps | Time/Retired | Grid | Points |
|---|---|---|---|---|---|---|---|
| 1 | 14 | (Cyprus) Tio Ellinas | Marussia Manor Racing | 14 | 27:59,709 | 2 | 15 |
| 2 | 27 | (United Kingdom) Dean Stoneman | Koiranen GP | 14 | +0.293 | 3 | 12 |
| 3 | 1 | (United States) Conor Daly | ART Grand Prix | 14 | +0.774 | 5 | 10 |
| 4 | 3 | (United Kingdom) Jack Harvey | ART Grand Prix | 14 | +1.231 | 4 | 8 |
| 5 | 6 | (Russia) Daniil Kvyat | MW Arden | 14 | +1.865 | 8 | 6 |
| 6 | 8 | (United Kingdom) Nick Yelloly | Carlin | 14 | +5.507 | 6 | 6 (4+2) |
| 7 | 9 | (United Kingdom) Alexander Sims | Carlin | 14 | +7.964 | 7 | 2 |
| 8 | 16 | (United Kingdom) Dino Zamparelli | Marussia Manor Racing | 14 | +16.528 | 9 | 1 |
| 9 | 23 | (Italy) Giovanni Venturini | Trident Racing | 14 | +16.726 | 11 | |
| 10 | 12 | (Switzerland) Alex Fontana | Jenzer Motorsport | 14 | +17.149 | 13 | |
| 11 | 5 | (Romania) Robert Vișoiu | MW Arden | 14 | +17.894 | 10 | |
| 12 | 28 | (Estonia) Kevin Korjus | Koiranen GP | 14 | +21.765 | 12 | |
| 13 | 24 | (Republic of Ireland) Robert Cregan | Trident Racing | 14 | +22.332 | 16 | |
| 14 | 25 | (San Marino) Emanuele Zonzini | Trident Racing | 14 | +22.676 | 14 | |
| 15 | 11 | (Switzerland) Patric Niederhauser | Jenzer Motorsport | 14 | +23.253 | 24 | |
| 16 | 2 | (Argentina) Facu Regalia | ART Grand Prix | 14 | +24.575 | 15 | |
| 17 | 7 | (Macau) Luís Sá Silva | Carlin | 14 | +26.509 | 18 | |
| 18 | 4 | (Spain) Carlos Sainz Jr. | MW Arden | 14 | +27.365 | 26 | |
| 19 | 26 | (Finland) Patrick Kujala | Koiranen GP | 14 | +34.660 | 1 | |
| 20 | 21 | (United Kingdom) Alice Powell | Bamboo Engineering | 14 | +36.238 | 19 | |
| 21 | 18 | (Hong Kong) Adderly Fong | Status Grand Prix | 14 | +41.130 | 17 | |
| 22 | 19 | (United Kingdom) Josh Webster | Status Grand Prix | 14 | +44.113 | 21 | |
| 23 | 22 | (Spain) Carmen Jordá | Bamboo Engineering | 14 | +49.498 | 25 | |
| 24 | 15 | (United Kingdom) Ryan Cullen | Marussia Manor Racing | 14 | +1:09.299 | 20 | |
| 25 | 10 | (Venezuela) Samin Gómez | Jenzer Motorsport | 14 | +1:09.861 | 22 | |
| 26 | 17 | (Sweden) Jimmy Eriksson | Status Grand Prix | 14 | +1:22.070 | 23 | |
Fastest lap: Nick Yelloly (Carlin) — 1:58.487 (on lap 11)

== Final championship standings ==
Drivers' Championship standings

| | Pos. | Driver | Points |
|---|---|---|---|
| 1 | 1 | (Russia) **Daniil Kvyat** | **168** |
| 1 | 2 | (Argentina) Facu Regalia | 138 |
| 1 | 3 | (United States) Conor Daly | 126 |
| 2 | 4 | (Cyprus) Tio Ellinas | 116 |
| | 5 | (United Kingdom) Jack Harvey | 114 |

Teams' Championship standings

| Pos. | Team | Points |
|---|---|---|
| 1 | (France) **ART Grand Prix** | **378** |
| 2 | (Australia) MW Arden | 278 |
| 3 | (Finland) Koiranen GP | 207 |
| 4 | (United Kingdom) Carlin | 168 |
| 5 | (United Kingdom) Marussia Manor Racing | 129 |

- Note: Only the top five positions are included for both sets of standings.
- Note: Bold names indicate the 2013 Drivers' and Teams' Champion respectively.

== See also ==
- 2013 Abu Dhabi Grand Prix
- 2013 Yas Marina GP2 Series round

| Previous round: 2013 Monza GP3 Series round | GP3 Series; 2013 season | Next round: 2014 Catalunya GP3 Series round |
| Previous round: none | Yas Marina GP3 round | Next round: 2014 Yas Marina GP3 Series round |
