= 2011 Spa-Francorchamps GP3 Series round =

(Belgium) 2011 Spa-Francorchamps GP3 round
Round details
- Round 7 of 8 rounds in the 2011 GP3 Series
- Location: Circuit de Spa-Francorchamps, Belgium
- Course: Permanent racing facility 7.004 km (4.352 mi)

GP3 Series

Race 1
- Date: 27 August 2011
- Laps: 12

Pole position
Driver	(United Kingdom) James Calado	Lotus ART
- Time: 2:20.146

Podium
First	(Finland) Valtteri Bottas	Lotus ART
Second	(United Kingdom) James Calado	Lotus ART
Third	(Netherlands) Nigel Melker	RSC Mücke Motorsport

Fastest lap
Driver	(Finland) Valtteri Bottas	Lotus ART
- Time: 2:33.485 (on lap 10)

Race 2
- Date: 28 August 2011
- Laps: 12

Podium
First	(New Zealand) Richie Stanaway	Lotus ART
Second	(United Kingdom) James Calado	Lotus ART
Third	(Switzerland) Nico Müller	Jenzer Motorsport

Fastest lap
Driver	(United Kingdom) James Calado	Lotus ART
- Time: 2:12.498

The 2011 Spa-Francorchamps GP3 Series round was a GP3 Series motor race held on August 27 and 28, 2011 at Circuit de Spa-Francorchamps, Belgium. It was the seventh round of the 2011 GP3 Series. The race supported the 2011 Belgian Grand Prix.

== Classification ==
=== Race 1 ===
Pos	No.	Driver	Team	Laps	Time/Retired	Grid	Points
1	2	(Finland) Valtteri Bottas	Lotus ART	12	31:02.902	2	10+1
2	3	(United Kingdom) James Calado	Lotus ART	12	+6.495	1	8+2
3	31	(Netherlands) Nigel Melker	RSC Mücke Motorsport	12	+13.979	3	6
4	10	(United Kingdom) Adrian Quaife-Hobbs	Marussia Manor Racing	12	+21.117	4	5
5	14	(United States) Conor Daly	Carlin	12	+24.915	6	4
6	23	(France) Tom Dillmann	Addax Team	12	+34.338	7	3
7	7	(Switzerland) Nico Müller	Jenzer Motorsport	12	+40.898	8	2
8	1	(New Zealand) Richie Stanaway	Lotus ART	12	+43.583	17	1
9	28	(United Kingdom) Lewis Williamson	MW Arden	12	+45.330	9	
10	6	(Russia) Ivan Lukashevich	Status Grand Prix	12	+50.869	12	
11	26	(New Zealand) Mitch Evans	MW Arden	12	+51.538	10	
12	11	(Indonesia) Rio Haryanto	Marussia Manor Racing	12	+53.789	19	
13	17	(Finland) Aaro Vainio	Tech 1 Racing	12	+1:01.520	13	
14	9	(Switzerland) Alex Fontana	Jenzer Motorsport	12	+1:05.130	14	
15	30	(Denmark) Michael Christensen	RSC Mücke Motorsport	12	+1:06.596	11	
16	24	(Colombia) Gabriel Chaves	Addax Team	12	+1:09.195	27	
17	19	(Hungary) Tamás Pál Kiss	Tech 1 Racing	12	+1:13.548	26	
18	12	(Finland) Matias Laine	Marussia Manor Racing	12	+1:14.024	29^{4}	
19	27	(Switzerland) Simon Trummer	MW Arden	12	+1:14.988	22	
20	25	(United Kingdom) Dean Smith	Addax Team	12	+1:20.817	24	
21	16	(Brazil) Leonardo Cordeiro	Carlin	12	+1:27.518	18	
22	18	(Netherlands) Thomas Hylkema	Tech 1 Racing	12	+1:49.087	25	
Ret	4	(United Kingdom) Alexander Sims	Status Grand Prix	9		16	
Ret	8	(Russia) Maxim Zimin	Jenzer Motorsport	9		20	
Ret	20	(Philippines) Marlon Stöckinger	ATECH CRS GP	6		15	
Ret	29	(Italy) Daniel Mancinelli	RSC Mücke Motorsport	3		21	
Ret	5	(Portugal) António Félix da Costa	Status Grand Prix	1		30^{5}	
Ret	15	(United Kingdom) Callum MacLeod	Carlin	1		28	
Ret	21	(United Kingdom) Nick Yelloly	ATECH CRS GP	0		5	
Ret	22	(Switzerland) Zoël Amberg	ATECH CRS GP	0		23	
Fastest lap: Valtteri Bottas (Lotus ART) 2:33.485 (on lap 10)

Notes

- ^4 – Laine received a fifteen place grid penalty for exiting the pitlane when a red light was showing and completing a lap of the track at the end of the practice session.
- ^5 – Da Costa was excluded from the qualifying results due to the car not complying with the technical regulations.

=== Race 2 ===
Pos	No.	Driver	Team	Laps	Time/Retired	Grid	Points
1	1	(New Zealand) Richie Stanaway	Lotus ART	12	26:47.675	1	6
2	3	(United Kingdom) James Calado	Lotus ART	12	+4.007	7	5+1
3	7	(Switzerland) Nico Müller	Jenzer Motorsport	12	+7.126	2	4
4	30	(Denmark) Michael Christensen	RSC Mücke Motorsport	12	+16.441	15	3
5	27	(Switzerland) Simon Trummer	MW Arden	12	+17.081	19	2
6	9	(Switzerland) Alex Fontana	Jenzer Motorsport	12	+19.013	14	1
7	14	(United States) Conor Daly	Carlin	12	+28.056	4	
8	6	(Russia) Ivan Lukashevich	Status Grand Prix	12	+29.348	10	
9	11	(Indonesia) Rio Haryanto	Marussia Manor Racing	12	+32.482	12	
10	20	(Philippines) Marlon Stöckinger	ATECH CRS GP	12	+32.534	25	
11	5	(Portugal) António Félix da Costa	Status Grand Prix	12	+33.189	27	
12	22	(Switzerland) Zoël Amberg	ATECH CRS GP	12	+36.271	30	
13	21	(United Kingdom) Nick Yelloly	ATECH CRS GP	12	+42.505	29	
14	19	(Hungary) Tamás Pál Kiss	Tech 1 Racing	12	+44.434	17	
15	8	(Russia) Maxim Zimin	Jenzer Motorsport	12	+44.881	24	
16	24	(Colombia) Gabriel Chaves	Addax Team	12	+45.707	16	
17	29	(Italy) Daniel Mancinelli	RSC Mücke Motorsport	12	+46.160	26	
18	16	(Brazil) Leonardo Cordeiro	Carlin	12	+46.479	21	
19	2	(Finland) Valtteri Bottas	Lotus ART	12	+48.235	8	
20	25	(United Kingdom) Dean Smith	Addax Team	12	+50.257	20	
21	18	(Netherlands) Thomas Hylkema	Tech 1 Racing	12	+2:07.765	22	
Ret	10	(United Kingdom) Adrian Quaife-Hobbs	Marussia Manor Racing	7		5	
Ret	23	(France) Tom Dillmann	Addax Team	7		3	
Ret	31	(Netherlands) Nigel Melker	RSC Mücke Motorsport	2		6	
Ret	4	(United Kingdom) Alexander Sims	Status Grand Prix	1		23	
Ret	26	(New Zealand) Mitch Evans	MW Arden	1		11	
Ret	17	(Finland) Aaro Vainio	Tech 1 Racing	1		13	
Ret	15	(United Kingdom) Callum MacLeod	Carlin	1		28	
Ret	12	(Finland) Matias Laine	Marussia Manor Racing	0		18	
DNS	28	(United Kingdom) Lewis Williamson	MW Arden			9	
Fastest lap: James Calado (Lotus ART) 2:12.498

== Standings after the round ==
Drivers' Championship standings

Pos	Driver	Points
1	(Finland) Valtteri Bottas	52
2	(United Kingdom) James Calado	47
3	(Netherlands) Nigel Melker	38
4	(United Kingdom) Alexander Sims	34
5	(United Kingdom) Adrian Quaife-Hobbs	33

Teams' Championship standings

Pos	Team	Points
1	(France) Lotus ART	106
2	(Australia) MW Arden	61
3	(Germany) RSC Mücke Motorsport	61
4	(United Kingdom) Marussia Manor Racing	52
5	(France) Tech 1 Racing	43

- Note: Only the top five positions are included for both sets of standings.

== See also ==
- 2011 Belgian Grand Prix
- 2011 Spa-Francorchamps GP2 Series round

Previous round: 2011 Hungaroring GP3 Series round	GP3 Series; 2011 season	Next round: 2011 Monza GP3 Series round
Previous round: 2010 Spa-Francorchamps GP3 Series round	Belgian GP3 round	Next round: 2012 Spa-Francorchamps GP3 Series round
