= 2013 Monza GP3 Series round =

Motor race competition

(Italy) 2013 Monza GP3 round
Round details
- Round 7 of 8 rounds in the 2013 GP3 Series
- Layout of the Autodromo Nazionale Monza
- Location: Autodromo Nazionale Monza, Monza, Italy
- Course: Permanent racing facility 5.793 km (3.600 mi)

GP3 Series

Race 1
- Date: 7 September 2013
- Laps: 17

Pole position
Driver	(Russia) Daniil Kvyat	MW Arden
- Time: 1:36.933

Podium
First	(Russia) Daniil Kvyat	MW Arden
Second	(United Kingdom) Nick Yelloly	Carlin
Third	(Argentina) Facu Regalia	ART Grand Prix

Fastest lap
Driver	(Russia) Daniil Kvyat	MW Arden
- Time: 1:38.359 (on lap 16)

Race 2
- Date: 8 September 2013
- Laps: 17

Podium
First	(United Kingdom) Jack Harvey	ART Grand Prix
Second	(Russia) Daniil Kvyat	MW Arden
Third	(United Kingdom) Lewis Williamson	Bamboo Engineering

Fastest lap
Driver	(United States) Conor Daly	ART Grand Prix
- Time: 1:38.237 (on lap 15)

The 2013 Monza GP3 Series round was a GP3 Series motor race held on 7 and 8 September 2013 at Autodromo Nazionale Monza, Italy. It was the seventh round of the 2013 GP3 Series. The race supported the 2013 Italian Grand Prix.

== Classification ==
=== Summary ===
Daniil Kvyat took his maiden GP3 pole position in qualifying, half a second ahead of his teammate Robert Vișoiu. Kvyat held the lead at the start of the race, avoiding a large incident at the first corner; Dino Zamparelli cut across the grass and hit Tio Ellinas, who in turn collided with Carlos Sainz Jr. and Conor Daly. Kvyat won the race with a gap of over five seconds to Nick Yelloly, putting himself into the title fight.

Patric Niederhauser lined up in pole position for the reverse grid race 2. However, he stalled at the start and was hit from behind by Alex Fontana, giving Jack Harvey the lead. Kvyat gained six positions during the race and began to challenge for the lead, but Harvey held him off to win the race with a gap of just nine tenths, with Lewis Williamson in third. Facu Regalia kept the lead in the drivers' championship going into the final round, with Kvyat seven points behind.

=== Qualifying ===
Pos.	No.	Driver	Team	Time	Grid
1	6	(Russia) Daniil Kvyat	MW Arden	1:36.933	1
2	5	(Romania) Robert Vișoiu	MW Arden	1:37.444	2
3	14	(Cyprus) Tio Ellinas	Marussia Manor Racing	1:37.526	3
4	9	(United Kingdom) Alexander Sims	Carlin	1:37.580	4
5	8	(United Kingdom) Nick Yelloly	Carlin	1:37.602	5
6	4	(Spain) Carlos Sainz Jr.	MW Arden	1:37.619	6
7	1	(United States) Conor Daly	ART Grand Prix	1:37.708	7
8	2	(Argentina) Facu Regalia	ART Grand Prix	1:37.715	8
9	28	(Estonia) Kevin Korjus	Koiranen GP	1:37.723	9
10	20	(United Kingdom) Lewis Williamson	Bamboo Engineering	1:37.942	10
11	16	(United Kingdom) Dino Zamparelli	Marussia Manor Racing	1:37.991	11
12	3	(United Kingdom) Jack Harvey	ART Grand Prix	1:38.111	12
13	11	(Switzerland) Patric Niederhauser	Jenzer Motorsport	1:38.113	13
14	18	(Hong Kong) Adderly Fong	Status Grand Prix	1:38.141	14
15	26	(Finland) Patrick Kujala	Koiranen GP	1:38.338	15
16	23	(Italy) Giovanni Venturini	Trident	1:38.419	16
17	21	(United Kingdom) Melville McKee	Bamboo Engineering	1:38.450	17
18	7	(Macau) Luís Sá Silva	Carlin	1:38.495	18
19	12	(Switzerland) Alex Fontana	Jenzer Motorsport	1:38.522	19
20	24	(Italy) David Fumanelli	Trident	1:38.566	20
21	27	(Finland) Aaro Vainio	Koiranen GP	1:38.606	26 ^{1}
22	17	(Sweden) Jimmy Eriksson	Status Grand Prix	1:38.615	21
23	19	(United Kingdom) Josh Webster	Status Grand Prix	1:38.660	22
24	25	(San Marino) Emanuele Zonzini	Trident	1:38.934	23
25	15	(United Kingdom) Ryan Cullen	Marussia Manor Racing	1:39.312	24
26	10	(Venezuela) Samin Gómez	Jenzer Motorsport	1:39.474	25
27	22	(Spain) Carmen Jordá	Bamboo Engineering	1:40.218	27

- ^1 Aaro Vainio was given a five-place grid penalty for causing a collision in the previous round.

=== Feature race ===
Pos.	No.	Driver	Team	Laps	Time/Retired	Grid	Points
1	6	(Russia) Daniil Kvyat	MW Arden	17	28:10.516	1	31 (25+4+2)
2	8	(United Kingdom) Nick Yelloly	Carlin	17	+5.352	5	18
3	2	(Argentina) Facu Regalia	ART Grand Prix	17	+8.084	8	15
4	20	(United Kingdom) Lewis Williamson	Bamboo Engineering	17	+8.694	10	12
5	9	(United Kingdom) Alexander Sims	Carlin	17	+10.683	4	10
6	28	(Estonia) Kevin Korjus	Koiranen GP	17	+12.426	9	8
7	3	(United Kingdom) Jack Harvey	ART Grand Prix	17	+13.557	12	6
8	11	(Switzerland) Patric Niederhauser	Jenzer Motorsport	17	+23.166	13	4
9	4	(Spain) Carlos Sainz Jr.	MW Arden	17	+28.336	6	2
10	26	(Finland) Patrick Kujala	Koiranen GP	17	+30.410	15	1
11	23	(Italy) Giovanni Venturini	Trident	17	+30.779	16	
12	21	(United Kingdom) Melville McKee	Bamboo Engineering	17	+31.301	17	
13	17	(Sweden) Jimmy Eriksson	Status Grand Prix	17	+32.192	21	
14	25	(San Marino) Emanuele Zonzini	Trident	17	+33.913	23	
15	24	(Italy) David Fumanelli	Trident	17	+34.447	20	
16	27	(Finland) Aaro Vainio	Koiranen GP	17	+42.557	26	
17	10	(Venezuela) Samin Gómez	Jenzer Motorsport	17	+1:10.797	25	
18	22	(Spain) Carmen Jordá	Bamboo Engineering	17	+1:40.461	27	
19	18	(Hong Kong) Adderly Fong	Status Grand Prix	16	+1 lap	14	
20	15	(United Kingdom) Ryan Cullen	Marussia Manor Racing	16	+1 lap	24	
Ret	7	(Macau) Luís Sá Silva	Carlin	4	Retired	18	
Ret	12	(Switzerland) Alex Fontana	Jenzer Motorsport	2	Retired	19	
Ret	1	(United States) Conor Daly	ART Grand Prix	1	Retired	7	
Ret	5	(Romania) Robert Vișoiu	MW Arden	1	Retired	2	
Ret	14	(Cyprus) Tio Ellinas	Marussia Manor Racing	0	Retired	3	
Ret	16	(United Kingdom) Dino Zamparelli	Marussia Manor Racing	0	Retired	11	
DNS	19	(United Kingdom) Josh Webster	Status Grand Prix	0	Did not start	22	
Fastest lap: Daniil Kvyat (MW Arden) — 1:38.359 (on lap 16)

=== Sprint race ===
Pos.	No.	Driver	Team	Laps	Time/Retired	Grid	Points
1	3	(United Kingdom) Jack Harvey	ART Grand Prix	17	29:24.152	2	15
2	6	(Russia) 'Daniil Kvyat	MW Arden	17	+0.915	8	12
3	20	(United Kingdom) Lewis Williamson	Bamboo Engineering	17	+1.559	5	10
4	2	(Argentina) Facu Regalia	ART Grand Prix	17	+3.144	6	8
5	28	(Estonia) Kevin Korjus	Koiranen GP	17	+4.691	3	6
6	9	(United Kingdom) Alexander Sims	Carlin	17	+5.332	4	4
7	21	(United Kingdom) Melville McKee	Bamboo Engineering	17	+6.742	12	2
8	1	(United States) Conor Daly	ART Grand Prix	17	+7.466	23	3 (1+2)
9	4	(Spain) Carlos Sainz Jr.	MW Arden	17	+8.000	9	
10	5	(Romania) Robert Vișoiu	MW Arden	17	+13.426	22	
11	14	(Cyprus) Tio Ellinas	Marussia Manor Racing	17	+13.673	24	
12	26	(Finland) Patrick Kujala	Koiranen GP	17	+17.479	10	
13	27	(Finland) Aaro Vainio	Koiranen GP	17	+17.896	16	
14	25	(San Marino) Emanuele Zonzini	Trident	17	+21.467	14	
15	10	(Venezuela) Samin Gómez	Jenzer Motorsport	17	+38.077	17	
16	19	(United Kingdom) Josh Webster	Status Grand Prix	17	+42.320	25	
17	22	(Spain) Carmen Jordá	Bamboo Engineering	17	+49.997	18	
18	24	(Italy) David Fumanelli	Trident	17	+1:19.459	15	
19	7	(Macau) Luís Sá Silva	Carlin	16	+1 lap	26^{1}	
20	18	(Hong Kong) Adderly Fong	Status Grand Prix	15	+2 laps	19	
DNF	17	(Sweden) Jimmy Eriksson	Status Grand Prix	2	Retired	13	
DNF	8	(United Kingdom) Nick Yelloly	Carlin	2	Retired	7	
DNF	11	(Switzerland) Patric Niederhauser	Jenzer Motorsport	0	Retired	1	
DNF	12	(Switzerland) Alex Fontana	Jenzer Motorsport	0	Retired	21	
DNF	23	(Italy) Giovanni Venturini	Trident	0	Retired	11	
DNF	15	(United Kingdom) Ryan Cullen	Marussia Manor Racing	0	Retired	20	
EX	16	(United Kingdom) Dino Zamparelli	Marussia Manor Racing	0	Excluded^{2}	EX	
Fastest lap: Conor Daly (ART Grand Prix) — 1:38.237 (on lap 15)

- ^1 Luís Sá Silva was given a five-place grid penalty for causing a collision in race 1.
- ^2 Dino Zamparelli was excluded from the race for causing a serious collision in race 1.

== Standings after the round ==
Drivers' Championship standings

	Pos.	Driver	Points
	1	(Argentina) Facu Regalia	138
3	2	(Russia) Daniil Kvyat	131
1	3	(Estonia) Kevin Korjus	107
2	4	(United States) Conor Daly	104
2	5	(United Kingdom) Jack Harvey	96

Teams' Championship standings

	Pos.	Team	Points
	1	(France) ART Grand Prix	338
	2	(Australia) MW Arden	240
	3	(Finland) Koiranen GP	183
1	4	(United Kingdom) Carlin	127
1	5	(United Kingdom) Marussia Manor Racing	105

- Note: Only the top five positions are included for both sets of standings.

== See also ==
- 2013 Italian Grand Prix
- 2013 Monza GP2 Series round

Previous round: 2013 Spa-Francorchamps GP3 Series round	GP3 Series; 2013 season	Next round: 2013 Yas Marina GP3 Series round
Previous round: 2012 Monza GP3 Series round	Monza GP3 round	Next round: 2014 Monza GP3 Series round
