= 2013 Hungaroring GP3 Series round =

Motor racing competition

(Hungary) 2013 Hungaroring GP3 round
Round details
- Round 5 of 8 rounds in the 2013 GP3 Series
- Layout of the Hungaroring
- Location: Hungaroring, Mogyoród, Pest, Hungary
- Course: Permanent racing facility 4.381 km (2.722 mi)

GP3 Series

Race 1
- Date: 27 July 2013
- Laps: 17

Pole position
Driver	(Finland) Aaro Vainio	Koiranen GP
- Time: 1:32.811

Podium
First	(Finland) Aaro Vainio	Koiranen GP
Second	(United States) Conor Daly	ART Grand Prix
Third	(Russia) Daniil Kvyat	MW Arden

Fastest lap
Driver	(Finland) Aaro Vainio	Koiranen GP
- Time: 1:36.054 (on lap 2)

Race 2
- Date: 28 July 2013
- Laps: 17

Podium
First	(Romania) Robert Vișoiu	MW Arden
Second	(Spain) Carlos Sainz Jr.	MW Arden
Third	(Estonia) Kevin Korjus	Koiranen GP

Fastest lap
Driver	(Argentina) Facu Regalia	ART Grand Prix
- Time: 1:35.736 (on lap 3)

The 2013 Hungaroring GP3 Series round was a GP3 Series motor race held on 27 and 28 July 2013 at the Hungaroring in Mogyoród, Pest, Hungary. It was the fifth round of the 2013 GP3 Series. The race weekend supported the 2013 Hungarian Grand Prix.

== Classification ==
=== Summary ===
Aaro Vainio claimed pole position, repeating his feat from the previous year. He made a good start ahead of Conor Daly but struggled to build a large gap. A late safety car was called to recover the car of Emanuele Zonzini, who collided with Luís Sá Silva, resulting in a two-lap sprint to the finish. Vainio held the lead to win the race, becoming the first two-time winner of the season. Daniil Kvyat finished in third, his first podium of the season.

Robert Vișoiu started on pole for the reverse grid sprint race. He made a clean getaway and held off teammate Carlos Sainz Jr. throughout the race. There was another penultimate-lap dash, this time following a safety car to recover Melville McKee and Lewis Williamson. Vișoiu led from lights to flag to win the race, with Sainz making it a one-two for MW Arden. Kevin Korjus took third place. Despite not scoring in either race, Tio Ellinas kept the championship lead, only one point ahead of Facu Regalia.

=== Qualifying ===
Pos.	No.	Driver	Team	Time	Grid
1	27	(Finland) Aaro Vainio	Koiranen GP	1:32.811	1
2	1	(United States) Conor Daly	ART Grand Prix	1:32.987	2
3	6	(Russia) Daniil Kvyat	MW Arden	1:33.070	3
4	28	(Estonia) Kevin Korjus	Koiranen GP	1:33.104	4
5	3	(United Kingdom) Jack Harvey	ART Grand Prix	1:33.109	5
6	20	(United Kingdom) Lewis Williamson	Bamboo Engineering	1:33.200	6
7	21	(United Kingdom) Melville McKee	Bamboo Engineering	1:33.337	7
8	4	(Spain) Carlos Sainz Jr.	MW Arden	1:33.345	8
9	2	(Argentina) Facu Regalia	ART Grand Prix	1:33.354	9
10	14	(Cyprus) Tio Ellinas	Marussia Manor Racing	1:33.384	10
11	5	(Romania) Robert Vișoiu	MW Arden	1:33.439	11
12	23	(Italy) Giovanni Venturini	Trident	1:33.582	12
13	11	(Switzerland) Patric Niederhauser	Jenzer Motorsport	1:33.599	13
14	12	(Switzerland) Alex Fontana	Jenzer Motorsport	1:33.614	14
15	8	(United Kingdom) Nick Yelloly	Carlin	1:33.658	15
16	16	(United Kingdom) Dino Zamparelli	Marussia Manor Racing	1:33.715	16
17	26	(Finland) Patrick Kujala	Koiranen GP	1:33.778	17
18	9	(Argentina) Eric Lichtenstein	Carlin	1:33.800	18
19	24	(Italy) David Fumanelli	Trident	1:33.893	19
20	17	(Sweden) Jimmy Eriksson	Status Grand Prix	1:34.089	20
21	19	(United Kingdom) Josh Webster	Status Grand Prix	1:34.237	26 ^{1}
22	18	(Hong Kong) Adderly Fong	Status Grand Prix	1:34.241	21
23	7	(Macau) Luís Sá Silva	Carlin	1:34.952	22
24	25	(San Marino) Emanuele Zonzini	Trident	1:35.006	23
25	10	(Venezuela) Samin Gómez	Jenzer Motorsport	1:35.491	24
26	15	(United Kingdom) Ryan Cullen	Marussia Manor Racing	1:36.046	25
27	22	(Spain) Carmen Jordá	Bamboo Engineering	1:37.246	27

- ^1 Josh Webster was given a five-place grid penalty for causing a collision in the previous round.

=== Feature Race ===
Pos.	No.	Driver	Team	Laps	Time/Retired	Grid	Points
1	27	(Finland) Aaro Vainio	Koiranen GP	17	29:17.213	1	31 (25+4+2)
2	1	(United States) Conor Daly	ART Grand Prix	17	+0.691	2	18
3	6	(Russia) Daniil Kvyat	MW Arden	17	+4.853	3	15
4	3	(United Kingdom) Jack Harvey	ART Grand Prix	17	+7.061	5	12
5	4	(Spain) Carlos Sainz Jr.	MW Arden	17	+7.282	8	10
6	2	(Argentina) Facu Regalia	ART Grand Prix	17	+7.507	9	8
7	28	(Estonia) Kevin Korjus	Koiranen GP	17	+8.588	9	6
8	5	(Romania) Robert Vișoiu	MW Arden	17	+9.307	11	4
9	23	(Italy) Giovanni Venturini	Trident	17	+11.550	12	2
10	12	(Switzerland) Alex Fontana	Jenzer Motorsport	17	+12.736	14	1
11	14	(Cyprus) Tio Ellinas	Marussia Manor Racing	17	+13.175	10	
12	16	(United Kingdom) Dino Zamparelli	Marussia Manor Racing	17	+14.139	16	
13	17	(Sweden) Jimmy Eriksson	Status Grand Prix	17	+16.751	20	
14	26	(Finland) Patrick Kujala	Koiranen GP	17	+18.645	17	
15	8	(United Kingdom) Nick Yelloly	Carlin	17	+18.793	15	
16	24	(Italy) David Fumanelli	Trident	17	+19.245	19	
17	21	(United Kingdom) Melville McKee	Bamboo Engineering	17	+21.309	7	
18	9	(Argentina) Eric Lichtenstein	Carlin	17	+21.428	18	
19	10	(Venezuela) Samin Gómez	Jenzer Motorsport	17	+21.725	24	
20	18	(Hong Kong) Adderly Fong	Status Grand Prix	17	+22.012	21	
21	19	(United Kingdom) Josh Webster	Status Grand Prix	17	+22.372	26	
22	22	(Spain) Carmen Jordá	Bamboo Engineering	17	+22.793	27	
23	15	(United Kingdom) Ryan Cullen	Marussia Manor Racing	17	+23.417	25	
24	20	(United Kingdom) Lewis Williamson	Bamboo Engineering	17	+23.984	6	
25	11	(Switzerland) Patric Niederhauser	Jenzer Motorsport	17	+30.295 ^{1}	13	
Ret	25	(San Marino) Emanuele Zonzini	Trident	12	Collision	23	
Ret	7	(Macau) Luís Sá Silva	Carlin	12	Collision	22	
Fastest lap: Aaro Vainio (Koiranen GP) — 1:36.054 (on lap 2)

- ^1 Patric Niederhauser finished in ninth, but received a 20-second time penalty for forcing another driver off the track.

=== Sprint Race ===
Pos.	No.	Driver	Team	Laps	Time/Retired	Grid	Points
1	5	(Romania) Robert Vișoiu	MW Arden	17	28:59.150	1	15
2	4	(Spain) Carlos Sainz Jr.	MW Arden	17	+4.168	4	12
3	28	(Estonia) Kevin Korjus	Koiranen GP	17	+4.848	2	10
4	2	(Argentina) Facu Regalia	ART Grand Prix	17	+5.277	3	10 (8+2)
5	3	(United Kingdom) Jack Harvey	ART Grand Prix	17	+5.726	5	6
6	23	(Italy) Giovanni Venturini	Trident	17	+6.177	9	4
7	6	(Russia) Daniil Kvyat	MW Arden	17	+6.936	6	2
8	1	(United States) Conor Daly	ART Grand Prix	17	+7.424	7	1
9	27	(Finland) Aaro Vainio	Koiranen GP	17	+7.847	8	
10	14	(Cyprus) Tio Ellinas	Marussia Manor Racing	17	+8.718	11	
11	26	(Finland) Patrick Kujala	Koiranen GP	17	+11.603	14	
12	17	(Sweden) Jimmy Eriksson	Status Grand Prix	17	+14.318	13	
13	8	(United Kingdom) Nick Yelloly	Carlin	17	+15.622	15	
14	10	(Venezuela) Samin Gómez	Jenzer Motorsport	17	+15.941	19	
15	11	(Switzerland) Patric Niederhauser	Jenzer Motorsport	17	+16.176	25	
16	9	(Argentina) Eric Lichtenstein	Carlin	17	+16.588	18	
17	18	(Hong Kong) Adderly Fong	Status Grand Prix	17	+17.686	20	
18	24	(Italy) David Fumanelli	Trident	17	+17.898	16	
19	12	(Switzerland) Alex Fontana	Jenzer Motorsport	17	+18.761	10	
20	16	(United Kingdom) Dino Zamparelli	Marussia Manor Racing	17	+21.377	12	
21	22	(Spain) Carmen Jordá	Bamboo Engineering	17	+21.725	22	
22	7	(Macau) Luís Sá Silva	Carlin	17	+22.655	26	
DNF	20	(United Kingdom) Lewis Williamson	Bamboo Engineering	12	Retired	24	
DNF	21	(United Kingdom) Melville McKee	Bamboo Engineering	12	Retired	17	
DNF	15	(United Kingdom) Ryan Cullen	Marussia Manor Racing	2	Retired	23	
DNF	25	(San Marino) Emanuele Zonzini	Trident	2	Retired	27	
DSQ	19	(United Kingdom) Josh Webster	Status Grand Prix	17	Disqualified ^{1}	21	
Fastest lap: Facu Regalia (ART Grand Prix) — 1:35.736 (on lap 3)

- ^1 Josh Webster was disqualified from the race for forcing another driver off the track.

== Standings after the round ==
Drivers' Championship standings

	Pos.	Driver	Points
	1	(Cyprus) Tio Ellinas	91
	2	(Argentina) Facu Regalia	90
4	3	(Finland) Aaro Vainio	75
	4	(United Kingdom) Jack Harvey	75
2	5	(Estonia) Kevin Korjus	75

Teams' Championship standings

	Pos.	Team	Points
	1	(France) ART Grand Prix	236
1	2	(Australia) MW Arden	157
1	3	(Finland) Koiranen GP	150
	4	(United Kingdom) Marussia Manor Racing	98
	5	(United Kingdom) Carlin	52

- Note: Only the top five positions are included for both sets of standings.

== See also ==
- 2013 Hungarian Grand Prix
- 2013 Hungaroring GP2 Series round

Previous round: 2013 Nürburgring GP3 Series round	GP3 Series; 2013 season	Next round: 2013 Spa-Francorchamps GP3 Series round
Previous round: 2012 Hungaroring GP3 Series round	Hungaroring GP3 round	Next round: 2014 Hungaroring GP3 Series round
