= 2011 Valencia GP3 Series round =

(Spain) 2011 Valencia GP3 round
Round details
- Round 3 of 8 rounds in the 2011 GP3 Series
- Circuit de Valencia
- Location: Valencia Street Circuit; Valencia, Spain
- Course: Permanent racing facility 5.34 km (3.32 mi)

GP3 Series

Race 1
- Date: 25 June 2011
- Laps: 14

Pole position
Driver	(United Kingdom) Lewis Williamson	MW Arden
- Time: 1:58.693

Podium
First	(United Kingdom) Adrian Quaife-Hobbs	Marussia Manor Racing
Second	(United Kingdom) Lewis Williamson	MW Arden
Third	(New Zealand) Mitch Evans	MW Arden

Fastest lap
Driver	(United Kingdom) Adrian Quaife-Hobbs	Marussia Manor Racing
- Time: 1:59.663 (on lap 8)

Race 2
- Date: 26 June 2011
- Laps: 14

Podium
First	(United Kingdom) James Calado	Lotus ART
Second	(United Kingdom) Alexander Sims	Status Grand Prix
Third	(Finland) Valtteri Bottas	Lotus ART

Fastest lap
Driver	(United Kingdom) James Calado	Lotus ART
- Time: 1:59.500 (on lap 6)

The 2011 Valencia GP3 Series round was the third round of the 2011 GP3 Series season. It was held on June 24–26, 2011 at Valencia Street Circuit, Valencia, Spain, supporting the 2011 European Grand Prix.

== Classification ==
=== Race 1 ===
Pos	No.	Driver	Team	Laps	Time/Retired	Grid	Points
1	10	(United Kingdom) Adrian Quaife-Hobbs	Marussia Manor Racing	14	28:49.603	3	10+1
2	28	(United Kingdom) Lewis Williamson	MW Arden	14	+6.547	1	8+2
3	26	(New Zealand) Mitch Evans	MW Arden	14	+7.406	4	6
4	24	(Colombia) Gabriel Chaves	Addax Team	14	+11.403	7	5
5	25	(United Kingdom) Dean Smith	Addax Team	14	+14.315	2	4
6	4	(United Kingdom) Alexander Sims	Status Grand Prix	14	+17.022	16	3
7	2	(Finland) Valtteri Bottas	Lotus ART	14	+18.818	8	2
8	3	(United Kingdom) James Calado	Lotus ART	14	+19.339	9	1
9	21	(United Kingdom) Nick Yelloly	ATECH CRS GP	14	+26.837	26	
10	16	(Brazil) Leonardo Cordeiro	Carlin	14	+28.342	23	
11	22	(Switzerland) Zoël Amberg	ATECH CRS GP	14	+36.012	30	
12	14	(United States) Conor Daly	Carlin	14	+37.231	25	
13	9	(Italy) Vittorio Ghirelli	Jenzer Motorsport	14	+37.241	28	
14	20	(Philippines) Marlon Stöckinger	ATECH CRS GP	14	+39.355	21	
15	15	(Canada) Daniel Morad	Carlin	14	+40.131	18	
16	19	(Hungary) Tamás Pál Kiss	Tech 1 Racing	14	+41.619	20	
17	12	(Finland) Matias Laine	Marussia Manor Racing	14	+42.700	13	
18	29	(United Kingdom) Luciano Bacheta	RSC Mücke Motorsport	14	+48.068	19	
19	11	(Indonesia) Rio Haryanto	Marussia Manor Racing	14	+58.934	14	
20	23	(France) Tom Dillmann	Addax Team	14	+1:12.164	6	
Ret	31	(Netherlands) Nigel Melker	RSC Mücke Motorsport	8	Retired	11	
Ret	17	(Finland) Aaro Vainio	Tech 1 Racing	3	Retired	5	
Ret	1	(Brazil) Pedro Nunes	Lotus ART	3	Retired	24	
Ret	7	(Switzerland) Nico Müller	Jenzer Motorsport	1	Retired	15	
Ret	30	(Denmark) Michael Christensen	RSC Mücke Motorsport	1	Retired	17	
Ret	27	(Switzerland) Simon Trummer	MW Arden	0	Retired	10	
Ret	6	(Russia) Ivan Lukashevich	Status Grand Prix	0	Retired	12	
Ret	8	(Russia) Maxim Zimin	Jenzer Motorsport	0	Retired	22	
Ret	5	(Portugal) António Félix da Costa	Status Grand Prix	0	Retired	27	
Ret	18	(Netherlands) Thomas Hylkema	Tech 1 Racing	0	Retired	29	
Fastest lap: Adrian Quaife-Hobbs (Marussia Manor Racing) 1:59.663 (lap 8)

=== Race 2 ===
Pos	No.	Driver	Team	Laps	Time/Retired	Grid	Points
1	3	(United Kingdom) James Calado	Lotus ART	14	28:06.179	1	6+1
2	4	(United Kingdom) Alexander Sims	Status Grand Prix	14	+4.445	3	5
3	2	(Finland) Valtteri Bottas	Lotus ART	14	+7.917	2	4
4	26	(New Zealand) Mitch Evans	MW Arden	14	+10.808	6	3
5	24	(Colombia) Gabriel Chaves	Addax Team	14	+18.843	5	2
6	28	(United Kingdom) Lewis Williamson	MW Arden	14	+19.133	7	1
7	14	(United States) Conor Daly	Carlin	14	+19.212	12	
8	10	(United Kingdom) Adrian Quaife-Hobbs	Marussia Manor Racing	14	+20.037	8	
9	9	(Italy) Vittorio Ghirelli	Jenzer Motorsport	14	+20.659	13	
10	29	(United Kingdom) Luciano Bacheta	RSC Mücke Motorsport	14	+21.298	18	
11	25	(United Kingdom) Dean Smith	Addax Team	14	+22.293	4	
12	21	(United Kingdom) Nick Yelloly	ATECH CRS GP	14	+22.817	9	
13	19	(Hungary) Tamás Pál Kiss	Tech 1 Racing	14	+27.269	16	
14	7	(Switzerland) Nico Müller	Jenzer Motorsport	14	+28.381	23	
15	1	(Brazil) Pedro Nunes	Lotus ART	14	+34.266	30^{2}	
16	20	(Philippines) Marlon Stöckinger	ATECH CRS GP	14	+40.739	14	
17	16	(Brazil) Leonardo Cordeiro	Carlin	14	+51.691	10	
18	22	(Switzerland) Zoël Amberg	ATECH CRS GP	14	+1:01.816	11	
19	31	(Netherlands) Nigel Melker	RSC Mücke Motorsport	14	+1:39.578	21	
20	5	(Portugal) António Félix da Costa	Status Grand Prix	13	Retired	27	
21	8	(Russia) Maxim Zimin	Jenzer Motorsport	13	Retired	29^{2}	
22	11	(Indonesia) Rio Haryanto	Marussia Manor Racing	13	Retired	19	
Ret	30	(Denmark) Michael Christensen	RSC Mücke Motorsport	8	Retired	24	
Ret	23	(France) Tom Dillmann	Addax Team	8	Retired	20	
Ret	15	(Canada) Daniel Morad	Carlin	0	Retired	15	
Ret	12	(Finland) Matias Laine	Marussia Manor Racing	0	Retired	17	
Ret	17	(Finland) Aaro Vainio	Tech 1 Racing	0	Retired	22	
Ret	27	(Switzerland) Simon Trummer	MW Arden	0	Retired	25	
Ret	6	(Russia) Ivan Lukashevich	Status Grand Prix	0	Retired	26	
Ret	18	(Netherlands) Thomas Hylkema	Tech 1 Racing	0	Retired	28	
Fastest lap: James Calado (Lotus ART) 1:59.500 (lap 6)

Notes

1. – Zimin and Nunes were given a ten grid position penalty for causing collisions in Race 1.

== Standings after the round ==
Drivers' Championship standings

Pos	Driver	Points
1	(New Zealand) Mitch Evans	26
2	(Netherlands) Nigel Melker	22
3	(Italy) Andrea Caldarelli	20
4	(United Kingdom) Alexander Sims	16
5	(United Kingdom) James Calado	16

Teams' Championship standings

Pos	Team	Points
1	(Australia) MW Arden	37
2	(France) Tech 1 Racing	33
3	(Germany) RSC Mücke Motorsport	29
4	(France) Lotus ART	28
5	(Republic of Ireland) Status Grand Prix	23

- Note: Only the top five positions are included for both sets of standings.

== See also ==
- 2011 European Grand Prix
- 2011 Valencia GP2 Series round

Previous round: 2011 Catalunya GP3 Series round	GP3 Series; 2011 season	Next round: 2011 Silverstone GP3 Series round
Previous round: 2010 Valencia GP3 Series round	Valencia GP3 round	Next round: 2012 Valencia GP3 Series round
