= Amberg (disambiguation) =

Amberg may refer to the following places:

== Austria ==
- Amberg Castle (Schloss Amberg), located in Feldkirch, Vorarlberg
  - Feldkirch Amberg railway station near the castle

== Germany ==
- Amberg, Upper Palatinate, Bavaria, Germany
  - Amberg station in the town
- Amberg, Swabia, Bavaria, Germany
- Amberg (electoral district)

== United States ==
- Amberg, Wisconsin, a town in Wisconsin
- Amberg (community), Wisconsin, an unincorporated community in the Wisconsin town

== See also ==
- Amberg (name)
