= 2013 Spa-Francorchamps GP3 Series round =

(Belgium) 2013 Spa-Francorchamps GP3 round
Round details
- Round 6 of 8 rounds in the 2013 GP3 Series
- Layout of the Circuit de Spa-Francorchamps
- Location: Circuit de Spa-Francorchamps, Francorchamps, Wallonia, Belgium
- Course: Permanent racing facility 7.004 km (4.352 mi)

GP3 Series

Race 1
- Date: 24 August 2013
- Laps: 13

Pole position
Driver	(Spain) Carlos Sainz Jr.	MW Arden
- Time: 2:04.125

Podium
First	(Russia) Daniil Kvyat	MW Arden
Second	(United States) Conor Daly	ART Grand Prix
Third	(Argentina) Facu Regalia	ART Grand Prix

Fastest lap
Driver	(Russia) Daniil Kvyat	MW Arden
- Time: 2:06.456 (on lap 6)

Race 2
- Date: 25 August 2013
- Laps: 13

Podium
First	(United Kingdom) Alexander Sims	Carlin
Second	(United States) Conor Daly	ART Grand Prix
Third	(Argentina) Facu Regalia	ART Grand Prix

Fastest lap
Driver	(United Kingdom) Alexander Sims	Carlin
- Time: 2:07.134 (on lap 11)

The 2013 Spa-Francorchamps GP3 Series round was a GP3 Series motor race held on 24 and 25 August 2013 at Circuit de Spa-Francorchamps, Belgium. It was the sixth round of the 2013 GP3 Series. The race supported the 2013 Belgian Grand Prix.

== Classification ==
=== Summary ===
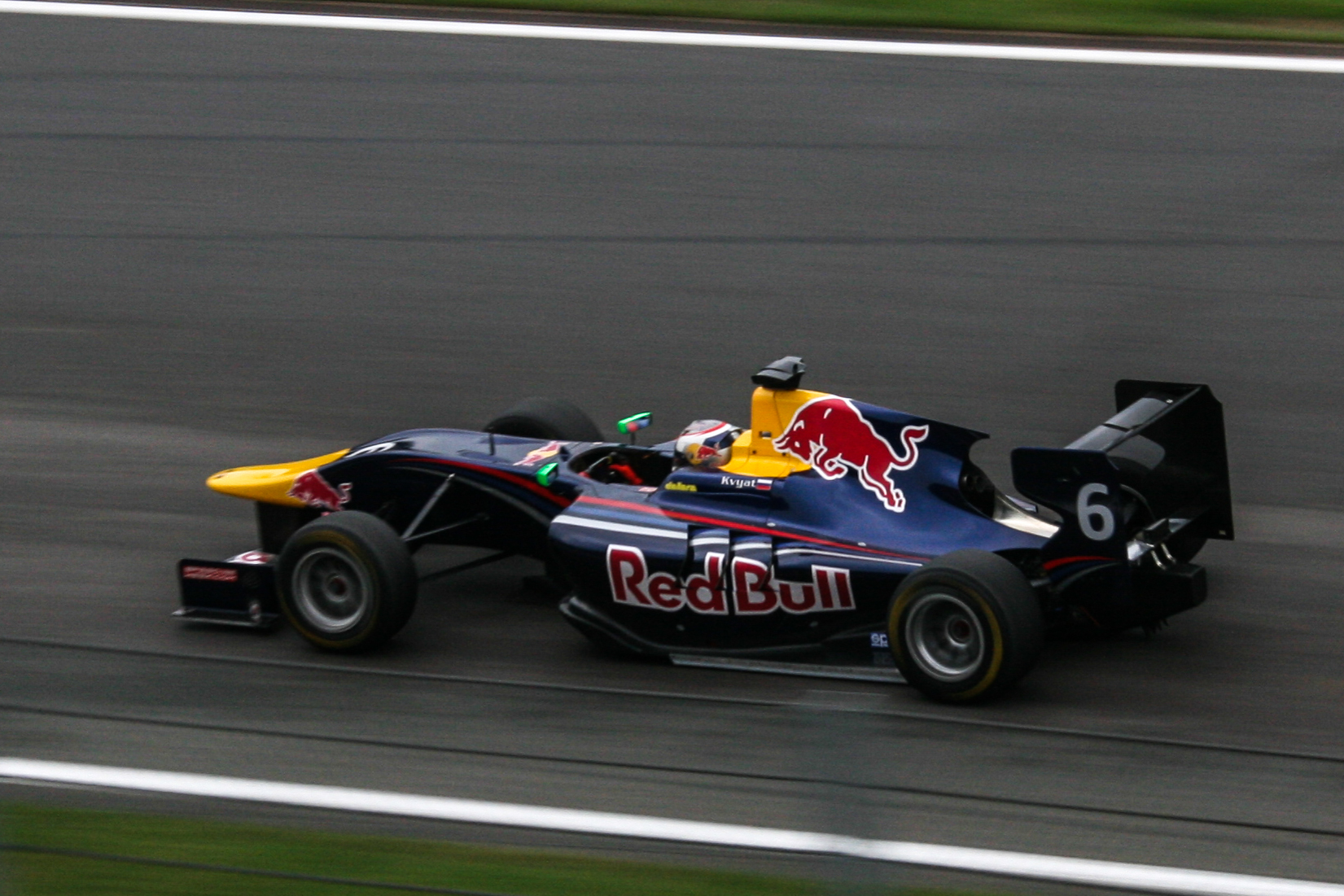
Daniil Kvyat

Alexander Sims returned to the grid, this time for Carlin. He replaced Eric Lichtenstein, whose contract was terminated for non-payment.

MW Arden locked out the front row of the grid for race 1, with Carlos Sainz Jr. beating Daniil Kvyat to take his first pole position. Kvyat got a better launch than Sainz, taking the lead into La Source. The first of three safety cars was called on the opening lap when Emanuele Zonzini and Josh Webster collided at turn one. On the restart, Adderly Fong and Patric Niederhauser also crashed in turn one. Then, with four laps remaining, Jack Harvey collided with Sainz, the impact with the barriers splitting Harvey's car in half. The race ended under safety car, with Kvyat taking his first win of the season.

Tio Ellinas started from pole for race 2. Sims had a good launch from fourth on the grid, taking the lead into turn 1 as Ellinas and Melville McKee collided. Sims pulled an eight-second gap over Conor Daly and Facu Regalia to win the race. Another weekend of poor results for Ellinas meant Regalia took the lead of the championship, fourteen points ahead of Daly.

=== Qualifying ===
Pos.	No.	Driver	Team	Time	Grid
1	4	(Spain) Carlos Sainz Jr.	MW Arden	2:04.125	1
2	6	(Russia) Daniil Kvyat	MW Arden	2:04.518	2
3	3	(United Kingdom) Jack Harvey	ART Grand Prix	2:04.518	3
4	1	(United States) Conor Daly	ART Grand Prix	2:04.524	4
5	14	(Cyprus) Tio Ellinas	Marussia Manor Racing	2:04.856	5
6	8	(United Kingdom) Nick Yelloly	Carlin	2:04.972	6
7	28	(Estonia) Kevin Korjus	Koiranen GP	2:05.027	7
8	2	(Argentina) Facu Regalia	ART Grand Prix	2:05.066	8
9	25	(Italy) David Fumanelli	Trident	2:05.255	9
10	23	(Italy) Giovanni Venturini	Trident	2:05.308	10
11	9	(United Kingdom) Alexander Sims	Carlin	2:05.334	11
12	5	(Romania) Robert Vișoiu	MW Arden	2:05.382	12
13	21	(United Kingdom) Melville McKee	Bamboo Engineering	2:05.486	13
14	20	(United Kingdom) Lewis Williamson	Bamboo Engineering	2:05.509	19 ^{1}
15	16	(United Kingdom) Dino Zamparelli	Marussia Manor Racing	2:05.541	14
16	11	(Switzerland) Patric Niederhauser	Jenzer Motorsport	2:05.576	15
17	27	(Finland) Aaro Vainio	Koiranen GP	2:05.760	16
18	18	(Hong Kong) Adderly Fong	Status Grand Prix	2:06.127	17
19	26	(Finland) Patrick Kujala	Koiranen GP	2:06.432	18
20	10	(Venezuela) Samin Gómez	Jenzer Motorsport	2:06.537	20
21	19	(United Kingdom) Josh Webster	Status Grand Prix	2:06.645	21
22	17	(Sweden) Jimmy Eriksson	Status Grand Prix	2:06.871	22
23	7	(Macau) Luís Sá Silva	Carlin	2:07.291	23
24	25	(San Marino) Emanuele Zonzini	Trident	2:07.582	24
25	15	(United Kingdom) Ryan Cullen	Marussia Manor Racing	2:08.434	26 ^{1}
26	22	(Spain) Carmen Jordá	Bamboo Engineering	2:09.095	27
27	12	(Switzerland) Alex Fontana	Jenzer Motorsport	No time	27

- ^1 Lewis Williamson and Ryan Cullen were both given five-place grid penalties for forcing a driver off the track in the previous round.

=== Feature race ===
Pos.	No.	Driver	Team	Laps	Time/Retired	Grid	Points
1	6	(Russia) Daniil Kvyat	MW Arden	13	32:40.446	2	27 25+2
2	1	(United States) Conor Daly	ART Grand Prix	13	+0.413	4	18
3	2	(Argentina) Facu Regalia	ART Grand Prix	13	+1.160	8	15
4	28	(Estonia) Kevin Korjus	Koiranen GP	13	+1.772	7	12
5	9	(United Kingdom) Alexander Sims	Carlin	13	+4.628	11	10
6	8	(United Kingdom) Nick Yelloly	Carlin	13	+4.965	6	8
7	21	(United Kingdom) Melville McKee	Bamboo Engineering	13	+5.713	13	6
8	14	(Cyprus) Tio Ellinas	Marussia Manor Racing	13	+5.978	5	4
9	5	(Romania) Robert Vișoiu	MW Arden	13	+6.869	12	2
10	16	(United Kingdom) Dino Zamparelli	Marussia Manor Racing	13	+7.760	14	1
11	23	(Italy) Giovanni Venturini	Trident	13	+8.569	10	
12	7	(Macau) Luís Sá Silva	Carlin	13	+8.895	23	
13	26	(Finland) Patrick Kujala	Koiranen GP	13	+9.585	18	
14	20	(United Kingdom) Lewis Williamson	Bamboo Engineering	13	+10.225	19	
15	24	(Italy) David Fumanelli	Trident	13	+11.039	9	
16	10	(Venezuela) Samin Gómez	Jenzer Motorsport	13	+11.640	20	
17	17	(Sweden) Jimmy Eriksson	Status Grand Prix	13	+12.374	22	
18	15	(United Kingdom) Ryan Cullen	Marussia Manor Racing	13	+13.052	26	
19	22	(Spain) Carmen Jordá	Bamboo Engineering	13	+13.560	25	
20	27	(Finland) Aaro Vainio	Koiranen GP	13	+15.162	16	
21	12	(Switzerland) Alex Fontana	Jenzer Motorsport	13	+35.157	27	
Ret	3	(United Kingdom) Jack Harvey	ART Grand Prix	9	Retired	3	
Ret	4	(Spain) Carlos Sainz Jr.	MW Arden	9	Retired	1	4
Ret	18	(Hong Kong) Adderly Fong	Status Grand Prix	2	Retired	17	
Ret	11	(Switzerland) Patric Niederhauser	Jenzer Motorsport	2	Retired	15	
Ret	19	(United Kingdom) Josh Webster	Status Grand Prix	1	Retired	21	
Ret	25	(San Marino) Emanuele Zonzini	Trident	0	Retired	24	
Fastest lap: Daniil Kvyat (MW Arden) — 2:06.456 (on lap 6)

=== Sprint race ===
Pos.	No.	Driver	Team	Laps	Time/Retired	Grid	Points
1	9	(United Kingdom) Alexander Sims	Carlin	13	27:45.036	4	17 (15+2)
2	1	(United States) Conor Daly	ART Grand Prix	13	+8.314	7	12
3	2	(Argentina) Facu Regalia	ART Grand Prix	13	+10.773	6	10
4	8	(United Kingdom) Nick Yelloly	Carlin	13	+15.100	3	8
5	28	(Estonia) Kevin Korjus	Koiranen GP	13	+16.251	5	6
6	6	(Russia) Daniil Kvyat	MW Arden	13	+18.230	8	4
7	16	(United Kingdom) Dino Zamparelli	Marussia Manor Racing	13	+18.963	10	2
8	5	(Romania) Robert Vișoiu	MW Arden	13	+20.051	9	1
9	11	(Switzerland) Patric Niederhauser	Jenzer Motorsport	13	+21.799	23	
10	20	(United Kingdom) Lewis Williamson	Bamboo Engineering	13	+24.203	14	
11	23	(Italy) Giovanni Venturini	Trident	13	+25.019	11	
12	12	(Switzerland) Alex Fontana	Jenzer Motorsport	13	+27.531	21	
13	4	(Spain) Carlos Sainz Jr.	MW Arden	13	+29.280	22	
14	24	(Italy) David Fumanelli	Trident	13	+32.874	15	
15	17	(Sweden) Jimmy Eriksson	Status Grand Prix	13	+35.087	17	
16	18	(Hong Kong) Adderly Fong	Status Grand Prix	13	+47.162	26	
17	15	(United Kingdom) Ryan Cullen	Marussia Manor Racing	13	+47.784	18	
18	19	(United Kingdom) Josh Webster	Status Grand Prix	13	+52.127	24	
19	22	(Spain) Carmen Jordá	Bamboo Engineering	13	+1:31.826	19	
20	26	(Finland) Patrick Kujala	Koiranen GP	13	+1:38.328	13	
21	7	(Macau) Luís Sá Silva	Carlin	12	+1 lap	12	
22	27	(Finland) Aaro Vainio	Koiranen GP	12	+1 lap	20	
23	25	(San Marino) Emanuele Zonzini	Trident	12	+1 lap	25	
DNF	10	(Venezuela) Samin Gómez	Jenzer Motorsport	10	Retired	16	
DNF	21	(United Kingdom) Melville McKee	Bamboo Engineering	6	Retired	2	
DNF	3	(United Kingdom) Jack Harvey	ART Grand Prix	5	Retired	27	
DNF	14	(Cyprus) Tio Ellinas	Marussia Manor Racing	2	Retired	1	
Fastest lap: Alexander Sims (Carlin) — 2:07.134 (on lap 11)

== Standings after the round ==
Drivers' Championship standings

	Pos.	Driver	Points
1	1	(Argentina) Facu Regalia	115
4	2	(United States) Conor Daly	101
2	3	(Cyprus) Tio Ellinas	95
1	4	(Estonia) Kevin Korjus	93
3	5	(Russia) Daniil Kvyat	88

Teams' Championship standings

Pos.	Team	Points
1	(France) ART Grand Prix	291
2	(Australia) MW Arden	168
3	(Finland) Koiranen GP	195
4	(United Kingdom) Marussia Manor Racing	105
5	(United Kingdom) Carlin	95

- Note: Only the top five positions are included for both sets of standings.

== See also ==
- 2013 Belgian Grand Prix
- 2013 Spa-Francorchamps GP2 Series round

Previous round: 2013 Hungaroring GP3 Series round	GP3 Series; 2013 season	Next round: 2013 Monza GP3 Series round
Previous round: 2012 Spa-Francorchamps GP3 Series round	Spa-Francorchamps GP3 round	Next round: 2014 Spa-Francorchamps GP3 Series round
