= 2011 Istanbul Park GP3 Series round =

Turkish Grand Prix round

(Turkey) 2011 Istanbul GP3 round
Round details
- Round 1 of 8 rounds in the 2011 GP3 Series
- Istanbul Park Circuit
- Location: Istanbul Park; Istanbul, Turkey
- Course: Permanent racing facility 5.34 km (3.32 mi)

GP3 Series

Race 1
- Date: 7 May 2011
- Laps: 15

Pole position
Driver	(France) Tom Dillmann	Carlin
- Time: 1:45.391

Podium
First	(Netherlands) Nigel Melker	RSC Mücke Motorsport
Second	(Italy) Andrea Caldarelli	Tech 1 Racing
Third	(France) Tom Dillmann	Carlin

Fastest lap
Driver	(Italy) Andrea Caldarelli	Tech 1 Racing
- Time: 1:47.227

Race 2
- Date: 8 May 2011
- Laps: 15

Podium
First	(United Kingdom) Alexander Sims	Status Grand Prix
Second	(Denmark) Michael Christensen	RSC Mücke Motorsport
Third	(Netherlands) Nigel Melker	RSC Mücke Motorsport

Fastest lap
Driver	(United Kingdom) Alexander Sims	Status Grand Prix
- Time: 1:47.601 (on lap 6)

The 2011 Istanbul GP3 Series round was the first round of the 2011 GP3 Series season. It was held on May 6–8, 2011 at Istanbul Speed Park, Istanbul, Turkey, supporting the 2011 Turkish Grand Prix.

== Classification ==
=== Race 1 ===
Pos	No.	Driver	Team	Laps	Time/Retired	Grid	Points
1	31	(Netherlands) Nigel Melker	RSC Mücke Motorsport	15	28:13.773	3	10
2	18	(Italy) Andrea Caldarelli	Tech 1 Racing	15	+0.605	2	9 (8+1)
3	15	(France) Tom Dillmann	Carlin	15	+2.942	1	8 (6+2)
4	2	(Finland) Valtteri Bottas	Lotus ART	15	+3.840	4	5
5	5	(Portugal) António Félix da Costa	Status Grand Prix	15	+4.410	10	4
6	26	(New Zealand) Mitch Evans	MW Arden	15	+7.214	7	3
7	30	(Denmark) Michael Christensen	RSC Mücke Motorsport	15	+10.608	6	2
8	4	(United Kingdom) Alexander Sims	Status Grand Prix	15	+11.713	12	1
9	25	(United Kingdom) Dean Smith	Addax Team	15	+11.928	11	
10	24	(Colombia) Gabriel Chaves	Addax Team	15	+19.559	15	
11	7	(Switzerland) Nico Müller	Jenzer Motorsport	15	+23.673	9	
12	22	(Switzerland) Zoël Amberg	ATECH CRS GP	15	+24.192	21	
13	21	(United Kingdom) Nick Yelloly	ATECH CRS GP	15	+24.977	22	
14	6	(Russia) Ivan Lukashevich	Status Grand Prix	15	+26.180	23	
15	17	(Finland) Aaro Vainio	Tech 1 Racing	15	+26.354	30	
16	19	(Hungary) Tamás Pál Kiss	Tech 1 Racing	15	+27.239	24	
17	3	(United Kingdom) James Calado	Lotus ART	15	+27.507	5	
18	12	(Finland) Matias Laine	Marussia Manor Racing	15	+29.871	25	
19	27	(Switzerland) Simon Trummer	MW Arden	15	+30.222	14	
20	23	(New Zealand) Dominic Storey	Addax Team	15	+30.644	18	
21	14	(United States) Conor Daly	Carlin	15	+31.336	29	
22	1	(Brazil) Pedro Nunes	Lotus ART	15	+32.066	19	
23	8	(Russia) Maxim Zimin	Jenzer Motorsport	15	+53.931	27	
24	10	(United Kingdom) Adrian Quaife-Hobbs	Marussia Manor Racing	15	+1:03.096	16	
25	9	(Italy) Vittorio Ghirelli	Jenzer Motorsport	14	+1 lap	26	
26	11	(Indonesia) Rio Haryanto	Marussia Manor Racing	13	+2 laps	13	
Ret	29	(United Kingdom) Luciano Bacheta	RSC Mücke Motorsport	8	Retired	20	
Ret	16	(Brazil) Leonardo Cordeiro	Carlin	3	Retired	28	
Ret	28	(United Kingdom) Lewis Williamson	MW Arden	3	Retired	8	
Ret	20	(Philippines) Marlon Stöckinger	ATECH CRS GP	1	Retired	17	
Fastest lap: Andrea Caldarelli (Tech 1 Racing) 1:47.227

=== Race 2 ===
Pos	No.	Driver	Team	Laps	Time/Retired	Grid	Points
1	4	(United Kingdom) Alexander Sims	Status Grand Prix	15	27:03.624	1	6+1
2	30	(Denmark) Michael Christensen	RSC Mücke Motorsport	15	+7.406	2	5
3	31	(Netherlands) Nigel Melker	RSC Mücke Motorsport	15	+13.983	8	4
4	5	(Portugal) António Félix da Costa	Status Grand Prix	15	+17.667	4	3
5	18	(Italy) Andrea Caldarelli	Tech 1 Racing	15	+17.876	7	2
6	25	(United Kingdom) Dean Smith	Addax Team	15	+18.760	9	1
7	26	(New Zealand) Mitch Evans	MW Arden	15	+18.948	3	
8	2	(Finland) Valtteri Bottas	Lotus ART	15	+22.792	5	
9	15	(France) Tom Dillmann	Carlin	15	+22.951	6	
10	11	(Indonesia) Rio Haryanto	Marussia Manor Racing	15	+27.212	26	
11	21	(United Kingdom) Nick Yelloly	ATECH CRS GP	15	+31.637	13	
12	24	(Colombia) Gabriel Chaves	Addax Team	15	+32.829	10	
13	3	(United Kingdom) James Calado	Lotus ART	15	+34.111	17	
14	22	(Switzerland) Zoël Amberg	ATECH CRS GP	15	+35.985	12	
15	7	(Switzerland) Nico Müller	Jenzer Motorsport	15	+36.315	11	
16	10	(United Kingdom) Adrian Quaife-Hobbs	Marussia Manor Racing	15	+36.883	24	
17	8	(Russia) Maxim Zimin	Jenzer Motorsport	15	+37.400	23	
18	19	(Hungary) Tamás Pál Kiss	Tech 1 Racing	15	+37.804	16	
19	29	(United Kingdom) Luciano Bacheta	RSC Mücke Motorsport	15	+38.419	27	
20	28	(United Kingdom) Lewis Williamson	MW Arden	15	+38.692	29	
21	27	(Switzerland) Simon Trummer	MW Arden	15	+39.477	19	
22	16	(Brazil) Leonardo Cordeiro	Carlin	15	+40.348	28	
23	20	(Philippines) Marlon Stöckinger	ATECH CRS GP	15	+47.122	30	
24	6	(Russia) Ivan Lukashevich	Status Grand Prix	15	+55.843	14	
25	14	(United States) Conor Daly	Carlin	15	+57.717	21	
26	1	(Brazil) Pedro Nunes	Lotus ART	14	+1 lap	22	
Ret	9	(Italy) Vittorio Ghirelli	Jenzer Motorsport	7	Retired	25	
Ret	23	(New Zealand) Dominic Storey	Addax Team	0	Retired	20	
Ret	12	(Finland) Matias Laine	Marussia Manor Racing	0	Retired	18	
Ret	17	(Finland) Aaro Vainio	Tech 1 Racing	0	Retired	15	
Fastest lap: Alexander Sims (Status Grand Prix) 1:47.601 (lap 6)

== Standings after the round ==
Drivers' Championship standings

Pos	Driver	Points
1	(Netherlands) Nigel Melker	14
2	(Italy) Andrea Caldarelli	11
3	(United Kingdom) Alexander Sims	8
4	(France) Tom Dillmann	8
5	(Denmark) Michael Christensen	7

Teams' Championship standings

Pos	Team	Points
1	(Germany) RSC Mücke Motorsport	21
2	(Republic of Ireland) Status Grand Prix	15
3	(France) Tech 1 Racing	11
4	(United Kingdom) Carlin	8
5	(France) Lotus ART	5

- Note: Only the top five positions are included for both sets of standings.

== See also ==
- 2011 Turkish Grand Prix
- 2011 Istanbul Park GP2 Series round

Previous round: 2010 Monza GP3 Series round	GP3 Series; 2011 season	Next round: 2011 Catalunya GP3 Series round
Previous round: 2010 Istanbul Park GP3 Series round	Turkish GP3 round	Next round: none
