= Aaro Vainio =

Finnish racing driver (born 1993)

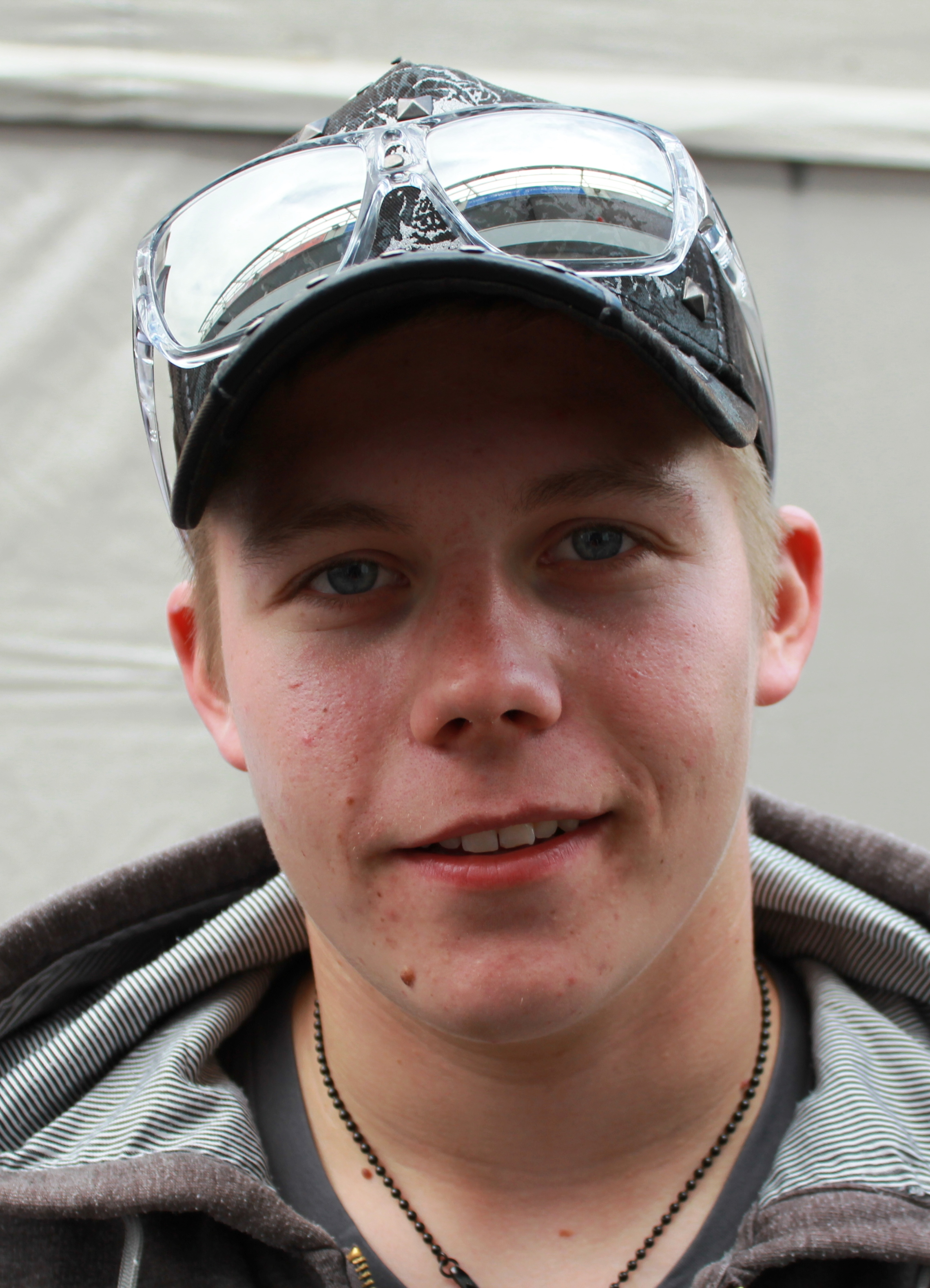
- Vainio in 2012.
- Nationality: (Finland) Finnish
- Born: 2 October 1993 (age 33) Espoo, Finland

GT World Challenge Europe
- Categorisation: FIA Silver
- Years active: 2019
- Teams: R-Motorsport
- Starts: 10
- Wins: 0
- Podiums: 0
- Poles: 0
- Fastest laps: 0
- Best finish: 15th in 2019

Previous series
- 2010 2010 2011-2013 2012 2017 2018: Eurocup Formula Renault 2.0; Formula Renault 2.0 UK; GP3 Series; Formula Renault 3.5 Series; Italian GT Championship; ADAC GT Masters

Championship titles
- 2017: Italian GT - Super GT Cup

Aaro Vainio (born 2 October 1993) is a Finnish former racing driver who last competed in the 2019 GT World Challenge Europe. He previously competed in GP3 Series between 2011 and 2013. He currently acts as a mentor towards Formula 3 driver Tuukka Taponen.

== Career ==
=== Karting ===
Vainio enjoyed a successful karting career. He won the Finnish championship in 2007, and in 2008, he won the European KF3 Championship and the Junior Monaco Kart Cup. In 2009, he was runner-up in the CIK-FIA Karting World Championship and was the European KF1 Champion.

=== Formula Renault ===
In 2010, Vainio stepped up to single-seater racing, driving for Tech 1 Racing in the Eurocup Formula Renault 2.0. He had been expected to be part of the SG Formula team, but the team shut down. His manager was Nicolas Todt, son of FIA president Jean Todt and manager of Formula One driver Felipe Massa who had set a goal to get Vainio to Formula One in 2014. Vainio was also a candidate for the Ferrari Young Driver Academy, but was unsuccessful. During the season, he took five podium finishes in the last eight races and placed fourth in the standings. In the same year, he also competed in one round of the Formula Renault 2.0 UK Championship, where he finished ninth in race two.

In 2012, Vainio returned to Formula Renault machinery to contest three rounds of the Formula Renault 3.5 Series, replacing the underperforming Anton Nebylitskiy. Despite a slow start where he qualified in last place and retired from race one in his first round, he took a podium in the final race of the season.

=== GP3 Series ===
For the 2011 racing season, Vainio moved into the GP3 series with Tech 1 Racing. He achieved a podium finish in his third race but only scored points twice during the remainder of the season, ultimately finishing 15th in the standings.

Vainio remained in GP3 for 2012, moving to the Lotus GP team, where he took his maiden series win in the first ever GP3 race in Monaco. He finished the season fourth in the standings, behind António Félix da Costa, teammate Daniel Abt and champion Mitch Evans.

In 2013, Vainio once again competed in GP3, this time for new team Koiranen GP. This season was not as successful; despite winning two races, he left the series one round before the end and finished ninth in the standings.

=== GT racing ===
After a hiatus from racing, Vainio entered the 2017 Italian GT Championship in the Super GT Cup, competing for Vincenzo Sospiri Racing alongside compatriot Tuomas Tujula. The pair won their class.

Vainio switched to ADAC GT Masters for 2018, racing for Team Rosberg with Michele Beretta. They scored points only twice during the campaign, finishing 37th overall and 17th in the Junior Cup.

Vainio last competed in the 2019 GT World Challenge Europe season, driving for R-Motorsport alongside Hugo de Sadeleer. They finished 15th overall, but were runners-up in the Silver Cup, with two class wins and an additional five class podiums. The pair also entered the 2019 24 Hours of Spa with Ricky Collard and Ferdinand Habsburg, but they did not finish the race.

== Racing record ==
=== Career summary ===
Season	Series	Team	Races	Wins	Poles	F.L.	Podiums	Points	Position
2010	Eurocup Formula Renault 2.0	Tech 1 Racing	16	0	2	2	5	101	4th
2010	Formula Renault UK	Tech 1 Racing	2	0	0	0	0	12	18th
2011	GP3 Series	Tech 1 Racing	16	0	0	0	1	12	15th
2012	GP3 Series	Lotus GP	16	1	2	0	4	123	4th
2012	Formula Renault 3.5 Series	Team RFR	6	0	0	0	1	27	18th
2013	GP3 Series	Koiranen GP	14	2	1	1	3	75	9th
2017	Italian GT Championship - Super GT Cup	Vincenzo Sospiri Racing	14	2	3	6	7	161	**1st**
2018	ADAC GT Masters	Team Rosberg	13	0	0	0	0	6	37th
2019	Blancpain GT World Challenge Europe	R-Motorsport	10	0	0	0	0	11.5	15th
2019	Blancpain GT World Challenge Europe - Silver Cup	R-Motorsport	10	2	0	0	7	99	**2nd**
2019	Blancpain GT Series Endurance Cup	R-Motorsport	1	0	0	0	0	0	NC
2019	Blancpain GT Series Endurance Cup - Silver Cup	R-Motorsport	1	0	0	0	0	0	NC

=== Complete Eurocup Formula Renault 2.0 results ===
(key) (Races in bold indicate pole position; races in italics indicate fastest lap)

Year	Entrant	1	2	3	4	5	6	7	8	9	10	11	12	13	14	15	16	DC	Points
2010	Tech 1 Racing	ALC; 1; 6	ALC; 2 Ret	SPA; 1; 7	SPA; 2; 12	BRN; 1; 5	BRN; 2; 8	MAG; 1; 6	MAG; 2 Ret	**HUN**; **1**; 3	**HUN**; **2**; 3	HOC; 1; 2	HOC; 2; 2	SIL; 1; 5	SIL; 2; 5	CAT; 1; 2	CAT; 2 Ret	4th	101

=== Complete GP3 Series results ===
(key) (Races in bold indicate pole position) (Races in italics indicate fastest lap)

Year	Entrant	1	2	3	4	5	6	7	8	9	10	11	12	13	14	15	16	D.C.	Points
2011	Tech 1 Racing	IST; FEA; 15	IST; SPR; Ret	CAT; FEA; 3	CAT; SPR; 20	VAL; FEA; Ret	VAL; SPR; Ret	SIL; FEA; 11	SIL; SPR; 18	NÜR; FEA; 7	NÜR; SPR; 13	HUN; FEA; 5	HUN; SPR; 7	SPA; FEA; 13	SPA; SPR; Ret	MNZ; FEA; 22^{†}	MNZ; SPR; 8	15th	12
2012	Lotus GP	CAT; FEA; 3	CAT; SPR; 4	**MON**; **FEA**; 1	MON; SPR; 7	VAL; FEA; 2	VAL; SPR; 7	SIL; FEA; 3	SIL; SPR; Ret	HOC; FEA; 5	HOC; SPR; 6	**HUN**; **FEA**; 5	HUN; SPR; 7	SPA; FEA; 6	SPA; SPR; 14	MNZ; FEA; 11	MNZ; SPR; 14	4th	123
2013	Koiranen GP	CAT; FEA; 5	CAT; SPR; 1	VAL; FEA; 7	VAL; SPR; 2	SIL; FEA; 11	SIL; SPR; 8	NÜR; FEA; 14	NÜR; SPR; 11	**HUN**; **FEA**; 1	HUN; SPR; 9	SPA; FEA; 20	SPA; SPR; 22†	MNZ; FEA; 16	MNZ; SPR; 13	YMC; FEA	YMC; SPR	9th	75

=== Complete Formula Renault 3.5 Series results ===
(key) (Races in bold indicate pole position) (Races in italics indicate fastest lap)

Year	Team	1	2	3	4	5	6	7	8	9	10	11	12	13	14	15	16	17	Pos	Points
2012	Team RFR	ALC; 1	ALC; 2	MON; 1	SPA; 1	SPA; 2	NÜR; 1	NÜR; 2	MSC; 1	MSC; 2	SIL; 1	SIL; 2	HUN; 1 Ret	HUN; 2; 18	LEC; 1; 16	LEC; 2; 6	CAT; 1; 8	CAT; 2; 3	18th	27

=== Complete ADAC GT Masters results ===
(key) (Races in bold indicate pole position) (Races in italics indicate fastest lap)

Year	Team	Car	1	2	3	4	5	6	7	8	9	10	11	12	13	14	DC	Points
2018	Team Rosberg	Lamborghini Huracán GT3	OSC; 1; 29	OSC; 2; 25	MST; 1; 22	MST; 2 DNS	RBR; 1; 30	RBR; 2; 15	NÜR; 1; 8	NÜR; 2; 20	ZAN; 1; 19	ZAN; 2; 26	SAC; 1; 9	SAC; 2; 25	HOC; 1; 25	HOC; 2; 17	37th	6

=== Complete Blancpain GT World Challenge Europe results ===
(key) (Races in bold indicate pole position) (Races in italics indicate fastest lap)

Year	Team	Car	Class	1	2	3	4	5	6	7	8	9	10	Pos.	Points
2019	R-Motorsport	Aston Martin Vantage AMR GT3	Silver	BRH; 1 Ret	BRH; 2; 11	MIS; 1; 17	MIS; 2; 7	ZAN; 1; 6	ZAN; 2; 8	NÜR; 1; 15	NÜR; 2; 14	HUN; 1; 9	HUN; 2; 9	2nd	99
