= 2017 Italian GT Championship =

26th season of the Italian GT championship

The 2017 Italian GT Championship was the 26th season of the Italian GT Championship, the grand tourer-style sports car racing founded by the Italian automobile club (ACI). The Championship consisted of seven Sprint race events. At each event there were held two races. The Season started on 29 April in Imola and ended on 8 October in Mugello.

== Calendar ==
All races were held in Italy.

Round	Circuit	Date
1	Autodromo Internazionale Enzo e Dino Ferrari	28-30 April
2	Misano World Circuit Marco Simoncelli	2-4 June
3	Autodromo Nazionale di Monza	16-18 June
4	Autodromo Internazionale del Mugello	14-16 July
5	Autodromo Internazionale Enzo e Dino Ferrari	8-10 September
6	Autodromo Vallelunga Piero Taruffi	22-24 September
7	Autodromo Internazionale del Mugello	6-8 October

== Teams and Drivers ==
=== Super GT3 ===
Team	Car	No.	Driver	Rounds
(Italy) Ombra	Lamborghini Huracán GT3	7	(Italy) Marco Cassarà	All
(Italy) Ombra	Lamborghini Huracán GT3	7	(Italy) Roberto Gentili	All
(Italy) Ombra	Lamborghini Huracán GT3	12	(Italy) Michele Beretta	All
(Italy) Ombra	Lamborghini Huracán GT3	12	(Italy) Alex Frasssineti	All
(San Marino) Audi Sport Italia	Audi R8 LMS	8	(France) Benoît Tréluyer	All
(San Marino) Audi Sport Italia	Audi R8 LMS	8	(Italy) Vittorio Ghirelli	All
(Italy) BMW Team Italia	BMW M6 GT3	15	(Italy) Stefano Comandini	All
(Italy) BMW Team Italia	BMW M6 GT3	15	(Italy) Alberto Cerqui	All
(Italy) Petri Corse Motorsport	Lamborghini Huracán GT3	16	(Israel) Bar Baruch	All
(Italy) Petri Corse Motorsport	Lamborghini Huracán GT3	16	(Italy) Federico Leo	1–3
(Italy) Petri Corse Motorsport	Lamborghini Huracán GT3	16	(Italy) Andrea Palma	4–6
(Italy) Petri Corse Motorsport	Lamborghini Huracán GT3	16	(Italy) Marco Mapelli	7
(Italy) Krypton Motorsport	Mercedes AMG GT3	22	(Italy) Angelo Stefano Pezzucchi	1–3
(Italy) Krypton Motorsport	Mercedes AMG GT3	22	(Italy) Luca Pastorelli	1–3
(Italy) Scuderia Baldini 27	Ferrari 488 GT3	27	(Italy) Matteo Malucelli	All
(Italy) Scuderia Baldini 27	Ferrari 488 GT3	27	(Italy) Eddie Cheever III	All
(Italy) AF Corse	Ferrari 488 GT3	31	(Japan) Motoaki Ishikawa	All
(Switzerland) Black Bull Swiss Racing	Ferrari 488 GT3	46	(Italy) Stefano Gai	All
(Switzerland) Black Bull Swiss Racing	Ferrari 488 GT3	46	(Italy) Mirko Venturi	1, 6–7
(Switzerland) Black Bull Swiss Racing	Ferrari 488 GT3	46	(Italy) Michele Rugolo	4–5
(Italy) Antonelli Motorsport	Lamborghini Huracán GT3	62	(Italy) Lorenzo Veglia	All
(Italy) Antonelli Motorsport	Lamborghini Huracán GT3	62	(Switzerland) Alain Valente	1–4
(Italy) Antonelli Motorsport	Lamborghini Huracán GT3	62	(Italy) Kikko Galbiati	5, 7
(Italy) Antonelli Motorsport	Lamborghini Huracán GT3	63	(Italy) Daniel Zampieri	All
(Italy) Antonelli Motorsport	Lamborghini Huracán GT3	63	(Italy) Riccardo Agostini	1–5, 7
(Italy) Antonelli Motorsport	Lamborghini Huracán GT3	63	(Italy) Raffaele Giammaria	6
(Italy) Easy Race	Ferrari 488 GT3	70	(Italy) Niccolò Schirò	All
(Italy) Easy Race	Ferrari 488 GT3	70	(Brazil) Jaime Melo	1–3
(Italy) Easy Race	Ferrari 488 GT3	70	(Italy) Marco Cioci	4–5
Entrylists:

=== GT3 ===
Team	Car	No.	Driver	Rounds
(Italy) MP1 Corse	Ferrari 458 Italia GT3	74	(Italy) Nicola Benucci	2–4
(Italy) MP1 Corse	Ferrari 458 Italia GT3	74	(Italy) Simone Niboli	2, 4–7
(Italy) MP1 Corse	Ferrari 458 Italia GT3	74	(Italy) Lorenzo Bontempelli	3, 5–6
(Italy) MP1 Corse	Ferrari 458 Italia GT3	74	(Italy) Stefano Colombo	7
(Italy) Colajanni Mario Albert	Corvette Z06.R GT3	76	(Italy) Mario Albert Colajanni	1–6
(Italy) Colajanni Mario Albert	Corvette Z06.R GT3	76	(Italy) Roberto Del Castello	1–6
(Italy) Easy Race	Ferrari 458 Italia GT3	79	(Italy) Francesco La Mazza	1–6
(Italy) Easy Race	Ferrari 458 Italia GT3	79	(Italy) Marco Magli	1–5, 7
(Italy) Ebimotors	Porsche 997 GT3-R	88	(Italy) Paolo Venerosi Pesciolini	All
(Italy) Ebimotors	Porsche 997 GT3-R	88	(Italy) Alessandro Baccani	All
(San Marino) Audi Sport Italia	Audi R8 LMS	98	(Italy) Davide Di Benedetto	3
(San Marino) Audi Sport Italia	Audi R8 LMS	98	(Italy) Michele Merendino "Apache Jr."	3
(San Marino) Audi Sport Italia	Audi R8 LMS	98	(Italy) Luca Magnoni	5, 7
(San Marino) Audi Sport Italia	Audi R8 LMS	98	(Italy) Luca Rangoni	5, 7
Entrylists:

=== Super GT Cup ===
Team	Car	No.	Driver	Rounds
(Italy) Vincenzo Sospiri Racing	Lamborghini Huracán Super Trofeo	101	(China) Liang Jiatong	All
(Italy) Vincenzo Sospiri Racing	Lamborghini Huracán Super Trofeo	101	(Brazil) Felipe Ortiz	All
(Italy) Vincenzo Sospiri Racing	Lamborghini Huracán Super Trofeo	106	(Finland) Aaro Vainio	All
(Italy) Vincenzo Sospiri Racing	Lamborghini Huracán Super Trofeo	106	(Finland) Tuomas Tujula	All
(Italy) Vincenzo Sospiri Racing	Lamborghini Huracán Super Trofeo	110	(Poland) Andrzej Lewandowski	3, 5
(Italy) Vincenzo Sospiri Racing	Lamborghini Huracán Super Trofeo	110	(Poland) Teodor Myszkowski	3, 5
(Italy) Vincenzo Sospiri Racing	Lamborghini Huracán Super Trofeo	116	(Italy) Riccardo Cazzaniga	All
(Italy) Vincenzo Sospiri Racing	Lamborghini Huracán Super Trofeo	116	(Italy) Antonio D'Amico	All
(Italy) Antonelli Motorsport	Lamborghini Huracán Super Trofeo	102	(Japan) Kasai Takashi	All
(Italy) Antonelli Motorsport	Lamborghini Huracán Super Trofeo	102	(Poland) Karol Basz	1–5, 7
(Italy) Antonelli Motorsport	Lamborghini Huracán Super Trofeo	102	(Italy) Alessandro Perullo	6
(Italy) Antonelli Motorsport	Lamborghini Huracán Super Trofeo	103	(Italy) Pietro Perolini	1–2, 4–7
(Italy) Antonelli Motorsport	Lamborghini Huracán Super Trofeo	103	(Italy) Pierluigi Alessandri	1, 3, 6
(Italy) Antonelli Motorsport	Lamborghini Huracán Super Trofeo	103	(Italy) Simone Sartori	2, 4
(Italy) Antonelli Motorsport	Lamborghini Huracán Super Trofeo	103	(Italy) Kikko Galbiati	3
(Italy) Antonelli Motorsport	Lamborghini Huracán Super Trofeo	103	(Italy) Pietro Negra	5
(Italy) Antonelli Motorsport	Lamborghini Huracán Super Trofeo	103	(Italy) Emanuele Romani	7
(Italy) Antonelli Motorsport	Lamborghini Huracán Super Trofeo	104	(Italy) Matteo Desideri	All
(Italy) Antonelli Motorsport	Lamborghini Huracán Super Trofeo	104	(Italy) Pietro Negra	1
(Italy) Antonelli Motorsport	Lamborghini Huracán Super Trofeo	104	(Italy) Piero Necchi	2–6
(Italy) Antonelli Motorsport	Lamborghini Huracán Super Trofeo	104	(Italy) Alessandro Perullo	7
(Italy) Antonelli Motorsport	Lamborghini Huracán Super Trofeo	107	(Italy) Paolo Ruberti	5
(Italy) Antonelli Motorsport	Lamborghini Huracán Super Trofeo	107	(Japan) Yuki Hurata	5
(Italy) Antonelli Motorsport	Lamborghini Huracán Super Trofeo	108	(United States) Ryan Hardwick	5
(Italy) Petri Corse Motorsport	Lamborghini Huracán Super Trofeo	111	(Italy) Mauro Trentin	1–4
(Italy) Petri Corse Motorsport	Lamborghini Huracán Super Trofeo	111	(Italy) Manuel Deodati	1
(Italy) Petri Corse Motorsport	Lamborghini Huracán Super Trofeo	111	(Italy) Alessandro Perullo	2
(Italy) Petri Corse Motorsport	Lamborghini Huracán Super Trofeo	111	(Italy) Simone Tempesta	3
(Italy) Petri Corse Motorsport	Lamborghini Huracán Super Trofeo	111	(Italy) Claudio Giudice	5
(Italy) Petri Corse Motorsport	Lamborghini Huracán Super Trofeo	111	(Italy) Andrea Perlini	5
(Italy) Imperiale Racing	Lamborghini Huracán Super Trofeo	123	(Italy) Alessandro Foglio Bonacini	All
(Italy) Imperiale Racing	Lamborghini Huracán Super Trofeo	123	(Italy) Manuel Lasagni	1
(Italy) Imperiale Racing	Lamborghini Huracán Super Trofeo	123	(Italy) Davide Durante	2–3
(Italy) Imperiale Racing	Lamborghini Huracán Super Trofeo	123	(Italy) Nicola Pastorelli	4–7
(Italy) Imperiale Racing	Lamborghini Huracán Super Trofeo	146	(Italy) Ivan Demis Benvenuti	1–4, 7
(Italy) Imperiale Racing	Lamborghini Huracán Super Trofeo	146	(Italy) Luca Demarchi	1–4, 7
Entrylists:

=== GT Cup ===
Team	Car	No.	Driver	Rounds
(Italy) CAAL Racing	Ferrari 458 Challenge Evo	161	(Italy) Leonardo Baccarelli	1–2, 6–7
(Italy) CAAL Racing	Ferrari 458 Challenge Evo	161	(Italy) Luigi Ferrara	2, 7
(Italy) Scarpellini Carlo	Porsche 991 GT3 Cup	163	(Italy) Carlo Scarpellini	3
(Italy) Scarpellini Carlo	Porsche 991 GT3 Cup	163	(Italy) Pablo Biolghini	3
(Italy) "Togo"	Porsche 997 GT3 Cup	164	(Italy) "Togo"	2
(Italy) Ebimotors	Porsche 997 GT3 Cup	169	(Italy) Francesco La Mazza	All
(Italy) Ebimotors	Porsche 997 GT3 Cup	169	(Italy) Giuseppe Nicolosi	1–5, 7
(Italy) Ebimotors	Porsche 997 GT3 Cup	169	(Italy) Simone Iaquinta	6
(Italy) Di Leo Enrico	Porsche 997 GT3 Cup	175	(Italy) Enrico Di Leo	1
(Italy) Di Leo Enrico	Porsche 997 GT3 Cup	175	(Italy) "Poppy"	1
(Italy) Siliprandi Racing	Porsche 997 GT3 Cup	176	(Italy) Eugenio Pisani	All
(Italy) Siliprandi Racing	Porsche 997 GT3 Cup	176	(Italy) Walter Palazzo	2–7
(Italy) Romani Emanuele	Porsche 997 GT3 Cup	177	(Italy) Emanuele Romani	6
(Italy) Romani Emanuele	Porsche 997 GT3 Cup	177	(Italy) Massimo Valentini	6
Entrylists:

=== GT4 ===
Team	Car	No.	Driver	Rounds
(Italy) Autorlando Motorsport	Porsche 997 GT4	203	(Italy) Dario Cerati	1, 7
(Italy) Autorlando Motorsport	Porsche 997 GT4	203	(Italy) Giuseppe Ghezzi	1
(Italy) Autorlando Motorsport	Porsche 997 GT4	203	(Italy) Maurizio Fondi	7
(Italy) Autorlando Motorsport	Porsche 997 GT4	204	(Italy) Giuseppe Ghezzi	7
(Italy) Autorlando Motorsport	Porsche 997 GT4	204	(Italy) Alessandro Giovanelli	7
(Italy) Kinetic Racing	Porsche Cayman GT4	205	(Italy) Nicola Neri	All
(Italy) Kinetic Racing	Porsche Cayman GT4	205	(Italy) Mauro Pizzola	4, 6–7
(Italy) Kinetic Racing	Porsche Cayman GT4	205	(Italy) Pierluigi Veronesi	5
(Italy) Kinetic Racing	Porsche Cayman GT4	299	(Russia) Mickail Spiridonov	4
(Italy) Kinetic Racing	Porsche Cayman GT4	299	(Italy) Pierluigi Veronesi	4
(Italy) Nova Race	Ginetta G55 GT4	206	(Italy) Luca Magnoni	1–5, 7
(Italy) Nova Race	Ginetta G55 GT4	207	(Italy) Gianluca Carboni	1–3
(Italy) Nova Race	Ginetta G55 GT4	207	(Italy) Gian Piero Cristoni	1
(Italy) Nova Race	Ginetta G55 GT4	207	(France) Philippe Salini	2
(Italy) Nova Race	Ginetta G55 GT4	207	(Italy) Alessandro Marchetti	3–5
(Italy) Nova Race	Ginetta G55 GT4	207	(Italy) Andrea Marchesini	4
(Italy) Nova Race	Ginetta G55 GT4	207	(Italy) Mark Speakerwas	5, 7
(Italy) Ebimotors	Porsche Cayman GT4 CS	240	(Italy) Matteo Arrigosi	4–5, 7
(Italy) Ebimotors	Porsche Cayman GT4 CS	240	(Italy) Tommaso Maino	4–5
(Italy) Ebimotors	Porsche Cayman GT4 CS	252	(Italy) Sabino De Castro	All
(Italy) Ebimotors	Porsche Cayman GT4 CS	252	(Italy) Matteo Gonfiantini	3
Entrylists:
