= Herman Amberg (educator) =

Danish-Norwegian educator

(Not to be confused with Herman Amberg Preus, an American clergyman, or with Herman "Hyman" Amberg, an American-Jewish gangster)

Herman Amberg (20 May 1754 – 23 December 1837) was a Danish-Norwegian educator.

He was born in Elsinore (Helsingør) as a son of goldsmith Lars Amberg, a Norwegian immigrant to Denmark. He was a brother of lexicographer Hans Christian Amberg. Herman Amberg was hired at Christiania Cathedral School (in Norway) in 1782, and became headmaster in 1799. From 1806 to 1825 he was the headmaster of Christiansand Cathedral School. Amberg often wrote in Latin, and helped with Jacob Baden's Danish-Latin dictionary as well as with his brother's Danish-German dictionary.

He was married to Marthe Bonsach from 1798 to her death in October 1835. They had no children. Herman Amberg died in December 1837.
