= Herman Amberg =

Danish musician and composer

- Born: 22 December 1834
- Died: 12 April 1902 (aged 67)
- Occupations: musician and composer.

Herman Amberg (22 December 1834 – 12 April 1902) was a Danish musician and composer.

A pupil of J.P.E. Hartmann and Anton Ree, in 1855 he set up in Viborg as music teacher and also worked as a singing teacher at the Latin School for 25 years. In 1868 he was organist at the cathedral and in 1892 was appointed a professor.

His brother Johan Amberg was also a musician.

== Compositions ==
Many of his works were published posthumously. The following list is incomplete.

- 24 Preludes (Hansen, 1888)
- Op.5 - Prélude for Piano (Hansen, 1893)
- Op.6 - Sechs Orgelstücke zum Theil als Postludien anwendbar. (Hansen, 1893)
- Op.7 - Paraphrase f. Org. über Gade’s Melodie „O rüst’ dich, Held von Golgatha“. (Hansen, 1894)
- Op.7a - Nine little pieces for organ or harmonium (Wilhelm Hansen, 1903)
- Op.8 - Små stykker for orgel eller harmonium (Hansen)
- Op.11 - 10 Præ- og Postludier (Hansen, ca.1904).
