= Johan Amberg =

Danish composer and violinist

Johan Lauritz Walbom Amberg (20 October 1846 – 19 June 1928) was a Danish composer and violinist.

He started studying singing at the Royal Danish Academy of Music in 1867, but he had to switch to violin because of problems with his voice. From 1877 to 1905, he was violinist in the Royal Danish Orchestra and after 1905, he dedicated himself to composition. Some of his music is still occasionally performed, for example on Båstad Kammermusik Festival in 2004 or in Wassenaar, the Netherlands in 2003.

His brother Herman Amberg (1834 - 1902) was also a musician.

== Works ==
List of selected works:

- Op. 11 Trio for clarinet (violin), cello and piano
- Op. 12 Fantasistykke (Fantasy Pieces) for clarinet (violin), viola (cello) and piano (1910)
- Op. 13 3 Sketches (Pastorale, Remembrance, Tarantelle) for Flute and Strings or Piano (pub.1914)
- Op. 14 Danse des lutins for cello and piano
- Suite for flute, clarinet (violin), oboe and piano (by 1905)
- Babillage de minuit: Humoresque (salon orchestra)
- Les Cigales
