= Hans Christian Amberg =

Danish lexicographer

Hans Christian Amberg, sometimes H. C. Amberg (8 April 1749 – 30 January 1815) was a Danish lexicographer.

He was born in Elsinore as a son of goldsmith Lars Amberg, a Norwegian immigrant to Denmark. He was a brother of educator Herman Amberg. He is known for his three-volume dictionary in German-Danish and Danish-German. He was helped by his brother as well as Jacob Baden, and the volumes were published in 1787, 1797 and 1810.

Amberg held other jobs besides making the dictionary; from 1795 to 1800 he was a controller at the Norwegian postal office in Copenhagen. He also wrote minor texts, among others in the magazine Det nyeste Magazin af Fortællinger between 1779 and 1781. He died in January 1815.
