= Giovanni Venturini =

Italian racing driver

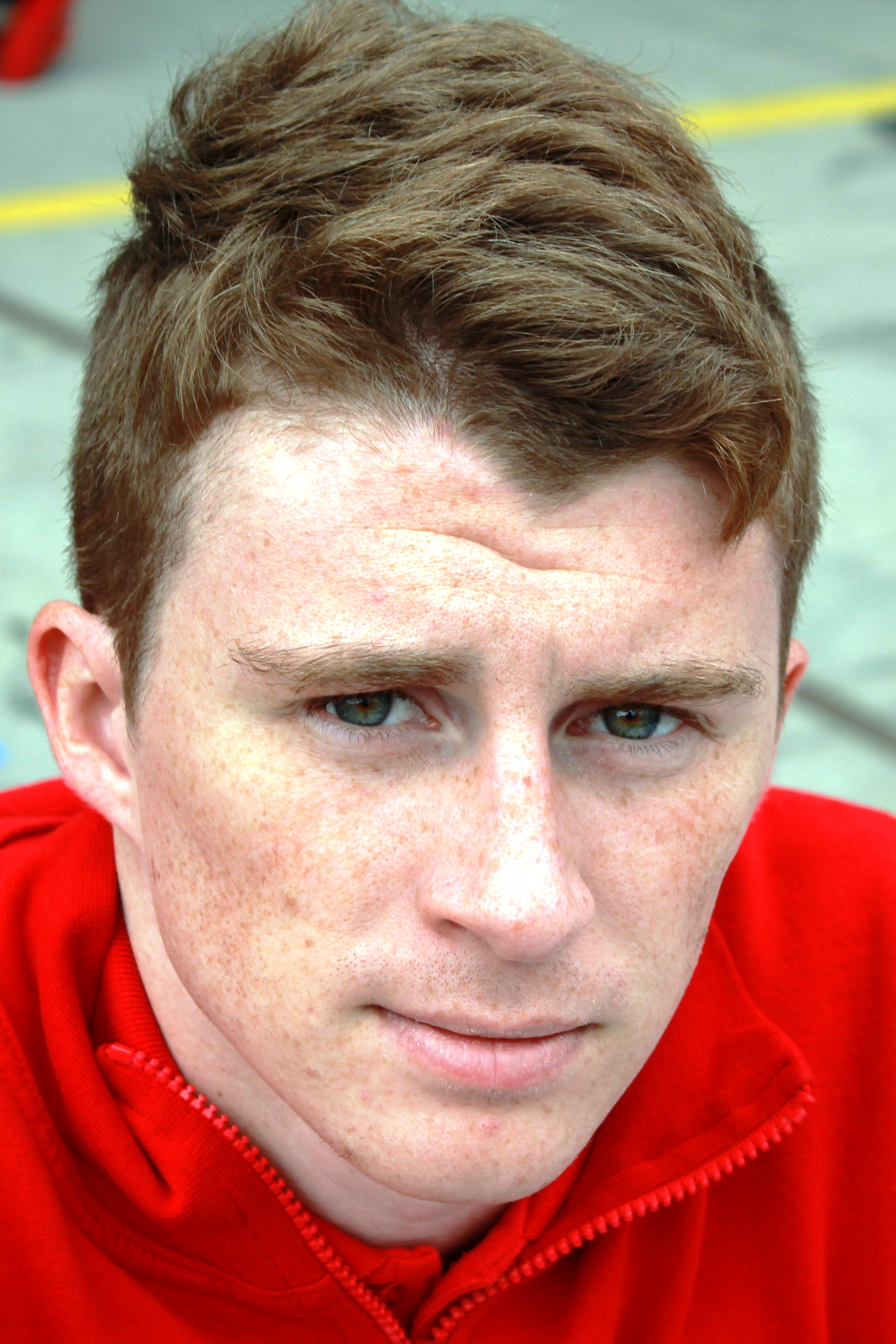
- Venturini in 2012.
- Nationality: (Italy) Italian
- Born: 9 November 1991 (age 34) Vicenza (Italy)

Blancpain Endurance Series career
- Debut season: 2015
- Current team: Grasser Racing Team
- Categorisation: FIA Silver (until 2015); FIA Gold (2016–)
- Car number: 63

Previous series
- 2014 2012-13 2012 2011 2010 2010 2010 2009 2009 2008–09 2008: Lamborghini Super Trofeo; Formula Renault 3.5 Series; Auto GP; Eurocup Formula Renault 2.0; British Formula Renault 2.0; Formula Renault 2.0 NEC; Italian Formula Renault 2.0; Swiss Formula Renault 2.0; Formula 2000 Light Italy; Portuguese Formula Renault 2.0

Giovanni Venturini (born 9 November 1991 in Vicenza) is an Italian professional racing driver. Between 2015 and 2021, he was a factory driver for Lamborghini.

== Career ==
=== Formula 2000 Light ===
Venturini began his Formula racing career in November 2008, racing in the Formula 2000 Light Italy Winter Trophy, where he finished as runner–up in the two–race series behind Martin Scuncio. The following season, he took part in the opening round of the main Formula 2000 Light season at Magione. He finished on the podium in both races, winning one of them, but as the event didn't count towards the championship he received no points.

=== Formula Renault 2.0 ===
In late 2008, Venturini took part in the Portuguese Formula Renault 2.0 Winter Series, held over two rounds at Jerez and Estoril, finishing tied on points with Adrian Quaife–Hobbs in 7th place.

2009 saw Venturini tackle dual–campaigns in the Italian Formula Renault 2.0 and Swiss Formula Renault 2.0 series with CO_{2} Motorsport. Despite missing the second round at Varano, he finished the Italian season third overall, recording nine podiums including a win at Misano. In the Swiss Championship, he took three race wins and a total of ten podium places en–route to the runner–up spot behind Jenzer Motorsport's Nico Müller.

In 2010, Venturini graduated to the premier Eurocup Formula Renault 2.0 series with the Spanish Epsilon Euskadi team. Racing with the brand–new Barazi–Epsilon designed chassis, Venturini finished the season fifth overall, taking two podium finishes including a win at Magny–Cours. He also took part in the British Formula Renault 2.0 support round at the Silverstone World Series by Renault meeting, finishing the two races in 16th and 14th places respectively, and also made an outing in the Formula Renault 2.0 Northern European Cup round at Spa–Francorchamps, taking a pole position for one of the three races.

=== Auto GP ===
In January 2011, Venturini took part in a two–day Auto GP test session held at the Circuit Ricardo Tormo near Valencia, finishing as the fastest driver on the first day. Early the following month, he was confirmed at the Durango team for the 2011 season, racing alongside fellow Italian driver Giuseppe Cipriani. He took his first series victory in the opening race of the season at Monza after starting from pole position. Another podium finish came at the following round at the Hungaroring before Venturini won his second race of the year at Oschersleben in July.

=== Formula Renault 3.5 Series ===
In October 2010, Venturini drove a Formula Renault 3.5 Series car for the first time, driving for Epsilon Euskadi and Junior Lotus Racing in the two–day test session held at the Circuit de Catalunya. The following week, he was one of 25 drivers invited by Renault Sport Technologies to participate in the next FR3.5 Series test session, held at Motorland Aragón in Spain, as a reward for finishing fifth in the Formula Renault 2.0 Eurocup.

After testing extensively for Draco Racing and Fortec Motorsport in late 2011, Venturini will graduate to the series in 2012, joining Nikolay Martsenko at Italian team BVM Target.

=== GP3 Series ===
In 2013, Venturini competed in the 2013 GP3 Series with Trident. He finished the championship in 15th position, with one win at Silverstone.

== Racing record ==
=== Career summary ===
Season	Series	Team	Races	Wins	Poles	F/Laps	Podiums	Points	Position
2008	Formula 2000 Light Italy - Winter Trophy	CO_{2} Motorsport	2	0	0	0	2	56	**2nd**
2008	Portuguese Formula Renault 2.0 - Winter Series	CO_{2} Motorsport	4	0	0	0	0	16	7th
2009	Formula 2000 Light Italy	CO_{2} Motorsport	2	1	0	1	2	0	NC†
2009	Italian Formula Renault 2.0	CO_{2} Motorsport	12	1	0	0	9	274	**3rd**
2009	Swiss Formula Renault 2.0	CO_{2} Motorsport	12	3	3	3	10	270	**2nd**
2010	Eurocup Formula Renault 2.0	Epsilon Euskadi	16	1	0	0	2	76	5th
2010	Formula Renault UK	Epsilon Euskadi	2	0	0	0	0	12	29th
2010	Formula Renault 2.0 NEC	Epsilon Euskadi	3	0	1	0	0	31	24th
2011	Auto GP	Griffitz Durango	14	2	1	0	3	76	9th
2012	GP3 Series	Trident Racing	10	0	0	0	2	31	13th
2012	Formula Renault 3.5 Series	BVM Target	7	0	0	0	0	3	25th
2013	GP3 Series	Trident Racing	16	1	0	0	1	26	15th
2014	Lamborghini Super Trofeo Europe	Eurotech Engineering	10	0	0	0	2	57	5th
2014	Lamborghini Super Trofeo World Final	Eurotech Engineering	2	0	0	0	0	0	NC
2014	International GT Open	Eurotech Engineering	0	0	0	0	0	0	NC
2015	Blancpain Endurance Series	GRT Grasser Racing Team	5	0	0	0	0	29	12th
2015	Italian GT Championship	Imperiale Racing	2	0	0	0	0	9	36th
2016	Italian GT Championship	Imperiale Racing	14	0	0	0	0	52.5	10th
2017	International GT Open	Imperiale Racing	14	2	0	0	6	114	**1st**
2017	Blancpain GT Series Sprint Cup	Attempto Racing	6	0	1	0	0	7	20th
2017	Blancpain GT Series Endurance Cup	Attempto Racing	2	0	0	0	0	0	NC
2018	International GT Open	Imperiale Racing	14	1	0	0	7	94	4th
2018	Blancpain GT Series Endurance Cup	GRT Grasser Racing Team	1	0	0	0	0	0	NC
2019	Blancpain GT Series Endurance Cup	Orange1 FFF Racing Team	5	0	0	0	1	30	9th
2020	GT World Challenge Europe Endurance Cup	Imperiale Racing	1	0	0	0	0	0	NC
2021	GT World Challenge America - Pro	K-Pax Racing	13	2	0	1	10	234	**2nd**
2021	Intercontinental GT Challenge	K-Pax Racing	1	0	0	0	0	6	18th
2022	FIA ETCR – eTouring Car World Cup	Romeo Ferraris	6	0	0	0	0	209	10th

† – As Venturini was a guest driver, he was ineligible for championship points. ^{*} Season still in progress.

=== Complete Formula Renault 2.0 NEC results ===
(key) (Races in bold indicate pole position) (Races in italics indicate fastest lap)

Year	Entrant	1	2	3	4	5	6	7	8	9	10	11	12	13	14	15	16	17	18	19	20	DC	Points
2010	Epsilon Euskadi	HOC; 1	HOC; 2	BRN; 1	BRN; 2	ZAN; 1	ZAN; 2	OSC; 1	OSC; 2	OSC; 3	ASS; 1	ASS; 2	MST; 1	MST; 2	MST; 3	SPA; 1 Ret	**SPA**; **2**; 4	SPA; 3; 8	NÜR; 1	NÜR; 2	NÜR; 3	26th	31

=== Complete Eurocup Formula Renault 2.0 results ===
(key) (Races in bold indicate pole position; races in italics indicate fastest lap)

Year	Entrant	1	2	3	4	5	6	7	8	9	10	11	12	13	14	15	16	DC	Points
2010	Epsilon Euskadi	ALC; 1; 4	ALC; 2 Ret	SPA; 1 Ret	SPA; 2; 8	BRN; 1; 15	BRN; 2; 11	MAG; 1; 4	**MAG**; **2**; 1	HUN; 1; 6	HUN; 2; 10	HOC; 1; 10	HOC; 2 Ret	SIL; 1 Ret	SIL; 2; 6	CAT; 1; 6	CAT; 2; 2	5th	76

=== Complete Auto GP results ===
(key) (Races in bold indicate pole position) (Races in italics indicate fastest lap)

Year	Entrant	1	2	3	4	5	6	7	8	9	10	11	12	13	14	Pos	Points
2011	Griffitz Durango	**MNZ**; **1**; 1	MNZ; 2; 5	HUN; 1; 3	HUN; 2; 7	BRN; 1 Ret	BRN; 2; 11	DON; 1; 9	DON; 2; 7	OSC; 1; 8	OSC; 2; 1	VAL; 1; 10	VAL; 2; 9	MUG; 1; 11	MUG; 2; 9	9th	76

=== Complete Formula Renault 3.5 Series results ===
(key) (Races in bold indicate pole position) (Races in italics indicate fastest lap)

Year	Team	1	2	3	4	5	6	7	8	9	10	11	12	13	14	15	16	17	Pos	Points
2012	BVM Target	ALC; 1 Ret	ALC; 2; 9	MON; 1 Ret	SPA; 1; 16	SPA; 2; 10	NÜR; 1; 22	NÜR; 2; 14	MSC; 1	MSC; 2	SIL; 1	SIL; 2	HUN; 1	HUN; 2	LEC; 1	LEC; 2	CAT; 1	CAT; 2	25th	3

=== Complete GP3 Series results ===
(key) (Races in bold indicate pole position) (Races in italics indicate fastest lap)

Year	Entrant	1	2	3	4	5	6	7	8	9	10	11	12	13	14	15	16	D.C.	Points
2012	Trident Racing	CAT; FEA	CAT; SPR	MON; FEA	MON; SPR	VAL; FEA	VAL; SPR	SIL; FEA; 13	SIL; SPR; 16	HOC; FEA; 3	HOC; SPR; 8	HUN; FEA; 11	HUN; SPR; Ret	SPA; FEA; 9	SPA; SPR; 9	MNZ; FEA; 8	MNZ; SPR; 3	13th	31
2013	Trident Racing	CAT; FEA; 12	CAT; SPR; 8	VAL; FEA; 15	VAL; SPR; 13	SIL; FEA; 8	SIL; SPR; 1	NÜR; FEA; 16	NÜR; SPR; 14	HUN; FEA; 9	HUN; SPR; 6	SPA; FEA; 11	SPA; SPR; 11	MNZ; FEA; 11	MNZ; SPR; Ret	YMC; FEA; 11	YMC; SPR; 9	15th	26

=== Complete Blancpain GT Series Sprint Cup results ===
Year	Team	Car	Class	1	2	3	4	5	6	7	8	9	10	Pos.	Points
2017	Attempto Racing	Lamborghini Huracán GT3	Pro	**MIS**; **QR**; 23	MIS; CR; 27	BRH; QR; 9	BRH; CR; 13	ZOL; QR; 9	ZOL; CR; 7	HUN; QR	HUN; CR	NÜR; QR	NÜR; CR	20th	7

Sporting positions
Preceded by Thomas Biagi; Fabrizio Crestani	International GT Open; Champion; 2017	Succeeded by Mikkel Mac
