= Zoël Amberg =

Swiss racing driver

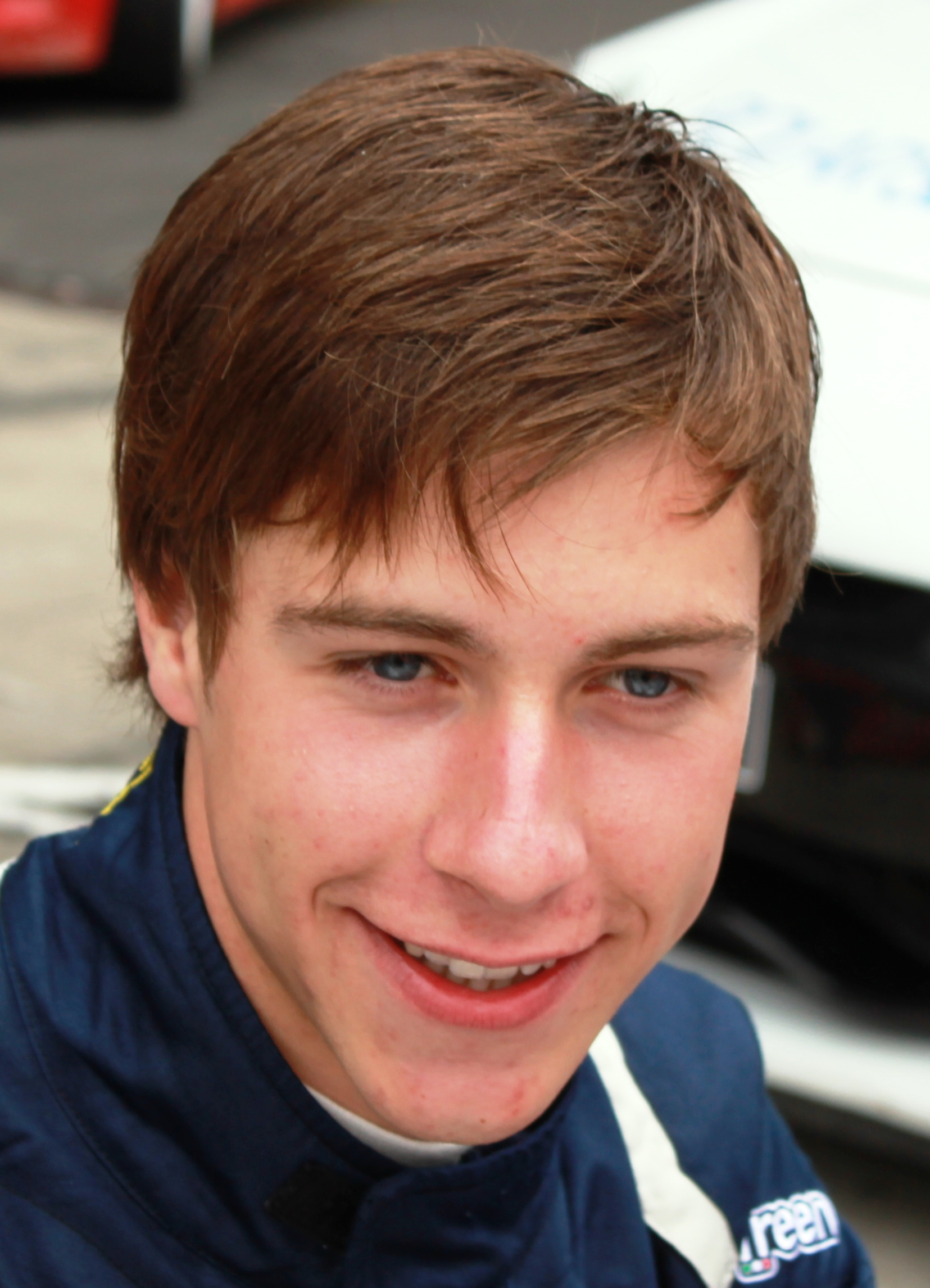
- Amberg in 2012.
- Nationality: Swiss
- Born: 25 September 1992 (age 34) Stans, Switzerland

Formula Renault 3.5 Series career
- Debut season: 2012
- Current team: AVF
- Categorisation: FIA Gold
- Car number: 20
- Former teams: Pons Racing
- Starts: 51
- Wins: 0
- Poles: 0
- Fastest laps: 1
- Best finish: 11th in 2014

Previous series
- 2011 2011 2010 2009–10 2009 2009: European F3 Open Championship; GP3 Series; Formula Abarth; Formula Renault 2.0 MEC; Italian Formula Renault 2.0; Formula Renault 2.0 WEC

Championship titles
- 2010: Formula Renault 2.0 MEC

Zoël Amberg (born 25 September 1992 in Stans) is a Swiss former professional racing driver.

== Career ==
=== Karting ===
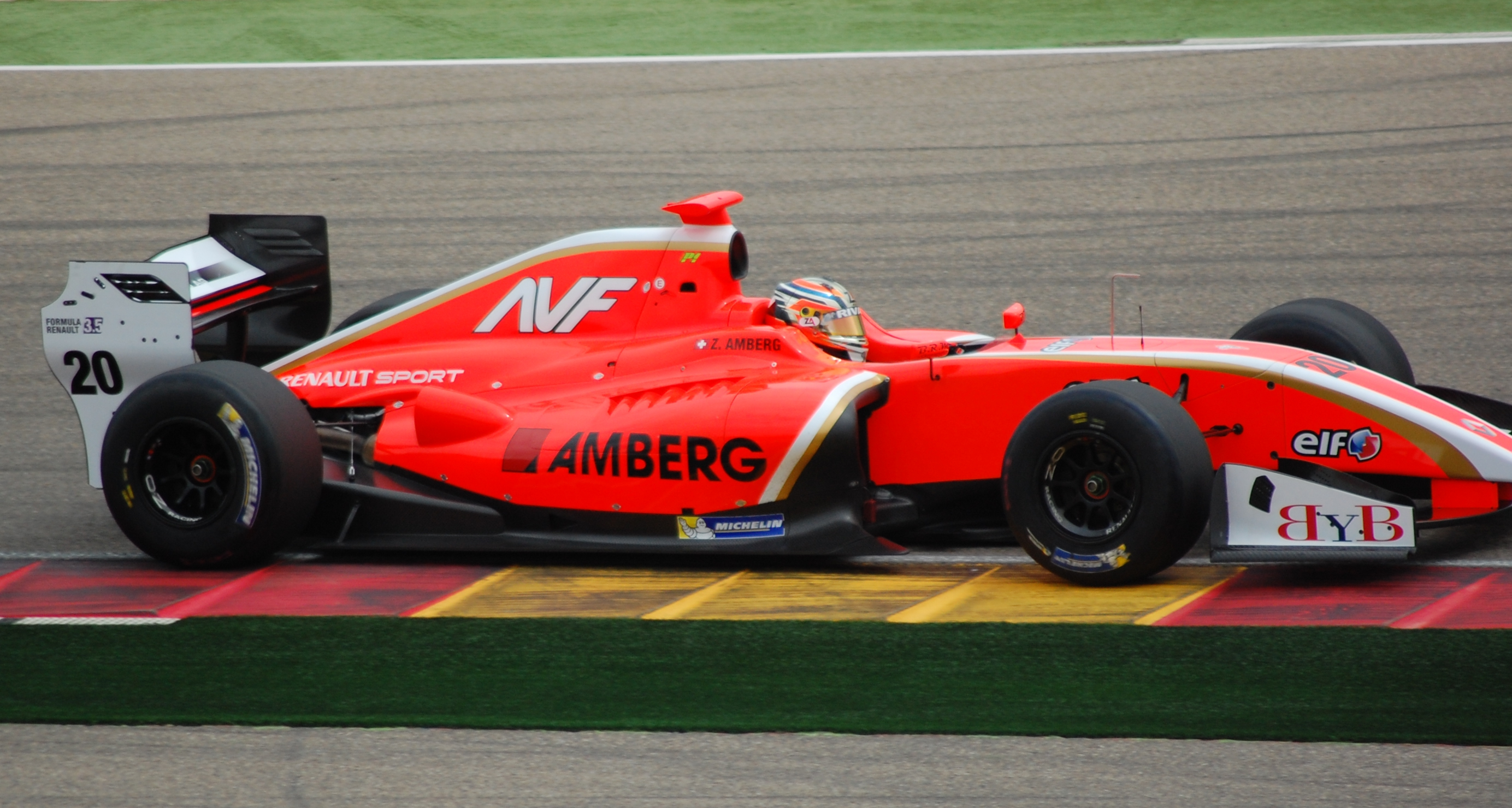
Amberg in Motorland 2014

Amberg began karting in 2004 and raced primarily in his native Switzerland for the majority of his career, working his way up from the junior ranks to progress through to the KF3 and KF2 categories by 2008, when he became a works driver for the Birel Motorsport team.

=== Formula Renault 2.0 ===
In 2009, Amberg graduated to single–seaters, racing in both the Italian Formula Renault 2.0 and Swiss Formula Renault 2.0 championships for Jenzer Motorsport. Two race victories at the final round of the season in Imola saw him finish fourth in the Italian series, whilst in the Swiss Formula Renault 2.0 championship he finished fifth overall after scoring points in all but one of the twelve races. During the year, he also contested a single round of the Formula Renault 2.0 West European Cup at Barcelona.

Amberg remained in Swiss Formula Renault 2.0 for a second season in 2010, when the series became known as the Formula Renault 2.0 Middle European Championship. He won the title in dominant fashion, finishing on the podium in all ten races he competed in, winning six of them.

=== Formula Abarth ===
Also in 2010, Amberg contested a full season in the newly launched Formula Abarth series in Italy. He took a single victory at the opening round of the season in Misano and a further eight points–scoring positions to finish seventh in the championship.

=== GP3 Series ===
In October 2010, Amberg made his debut in a GP3 Series car, taking part in the two post–season tests at Estoril and Jerez with Jenzer Motorsport, and in March 2011 it was announced that he had signed to race for ATECH CRS GP in the 2011 season, joining British Formula Renault 2.0 graduates Marlon Stöckinger and Nick Yelloly. He failed to score a point in the sixteen races he entered, taking a best race result of tenth at the sprint race in Barcelona.

=== Formula Three ===
In October 2011, Amberg joined De Villota Motorsport to contest the final three rounds of the European F3 Open season. Despite only taking part in six races, he finished eighth in the championship, taking four podium positions including a win at the final round in Barcelona.

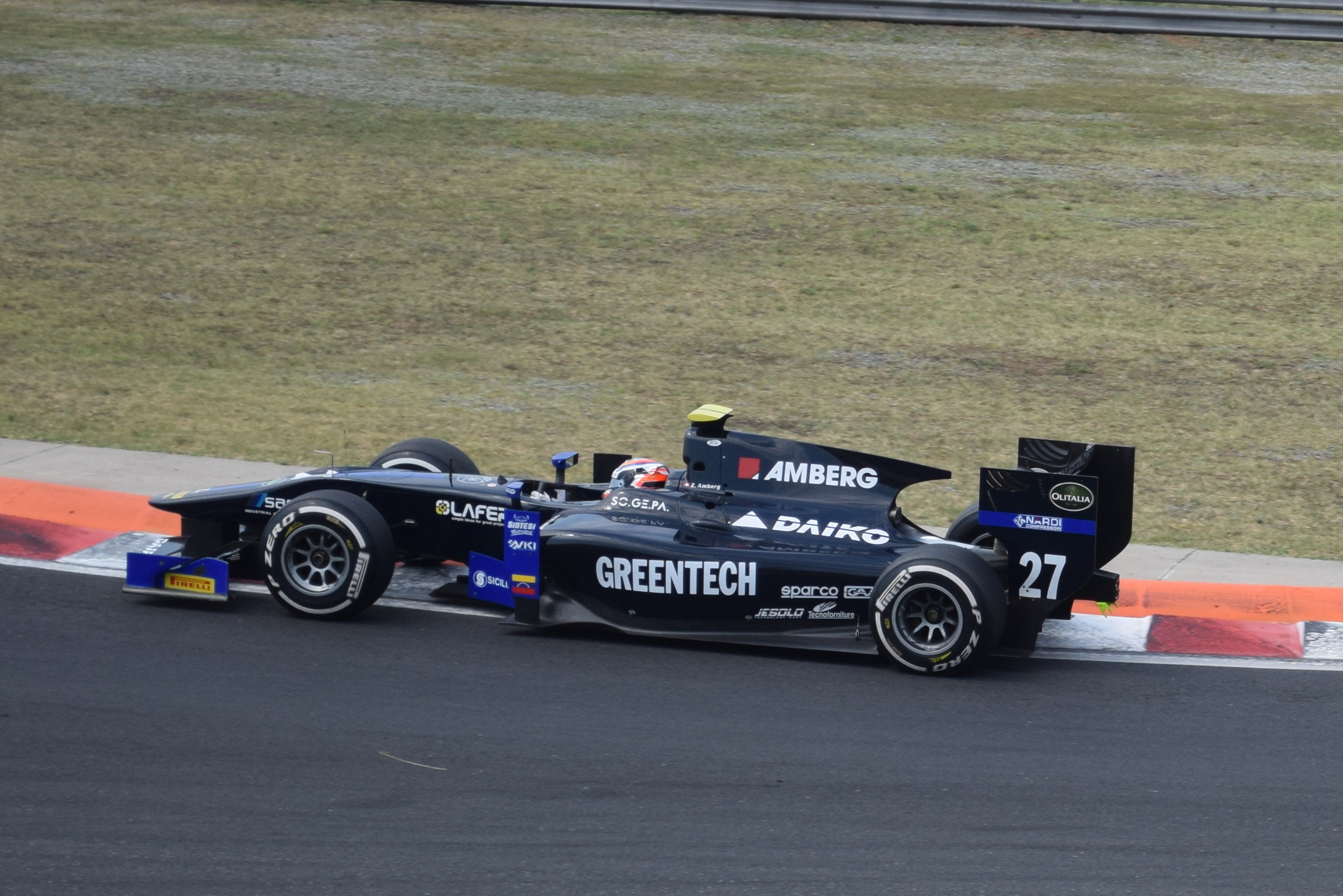
Amberg at Hungary 2015

=== Formula Renault 3.5 Series ===
In October 2010, Amberg made his debut at the wheel of a Formula Renault 3.5 Series car, testing for new team BVM–Target at Motorland Aragón. After testing extensively for Pons Racing during the latter part of 2011, it was confirmed in December 2011 that Amberg had signed a two–year contract with the team, beginning with the 2012 season. He will be joined by Formula Three graduate Yann Cunha.

== Racing record ==
=== Career summary ===
Season	Series	Team	Races	Wins	Poles	F/Laps	Podiums	Points	Position
2009	Italian Formula Renault 2.0	Jenzer Motorsport	14	2	2	0	2	228	4th
2009	Swiss Formula Renault 2.0	Jenzer Motorsport	12	0	0	0	1	150	5th
2009	Formula Renault 2.0 WEC	Jenzer Motorsport	2	0	0	0	0	0	21st
2010	Formula Renault 2.0 MEC	Jenzer Motorsport	10	6	2	1	10	243	**1st**
2010	Formula Abarth	Jenzer Motorsport	14	1	0	0	1	58	7th
2011	GP3 Series	ATECH CRS GP	16	0	0	0	0	0	28th
2011	European F3 Open	De Villota Motorsport	6	1	0	0	4	50	8th
2012	Formula Renault 3.5 Series	Pons Racing	17	0	0	0	0	1	26th
2013	Formula Renault 3.5 Series	Pons Racing	17	0	0	0	0	8	24th
2014	Formula Renault 3.5 Series	AVF	17	0	0	0	1	66	11th
2015	GP2 Series	Daiko Team Lazarus	6	0	0	0	0	0	29th
2015	FIA World Endurance Championship - LMP2	Team SARD Morand	2	0	0	0	1	18	17th

=== Complete GP3 Series results ===
(key) (Races in bold indicate pole position) (Races in italics indicate fastest lap)

Year	Entrant	1	2	3	4	5	6	7	8	9	10	11	12	13	14	15	16	DC	Points
2011	ATECH CRS GP	IST; FEA; 12	IST; SPR; 14	CAT; FEA; 16	CAT; SPR; 10	VAL; FEA; 11	VAL; SPR; 18	SIL; FEA; Ret	SIL; SPR; 16	NÜR; FEA; 21	NÜR; SPR; 20	HUN; FEA; 15	HUN; SPR; 16	SPA; FEA; Ret	SPA; SPR; 12	MNZ; FEA; Ret	MNZ; SPR; Ret	28th	0

=== Complete Formula Renault 3.5 Series results ===
(key) (Races in bold indicate pole position) (Races in italics indicate fastest lap)

Year	Team	1	2	3	4	5	6	7	8	9	10	11	12	13	14	15	16	17	Pos	Points
2012	Pons Racing	ALC; 1; 10	ALC; 2; 16	MON; 1; 14	SPA; 1; 18	SPA; 2 Ret	NÜR; 1; 16	NÜR; 2; 18	MSC; 1; 15	MSC; 2; 13	SIL; 1 Ret	SIL; 2 Ret	HUN; 1; 13	HUN; 2; 16	LEC; 1; 18	LEC; 2 Ret	CAT; 1; 24	CAT; 2; 22	26th	1
2013	Pons Racing	MNZ; 1; 12	MNZ; 2; 20	ALC; 1; 17	ALC; 2; 19	MON; 1; 20	SPA; 1; 19	SPA; 2; 16	MSC; 1; 21	MSC; 2; 22	RBR; 1; 11	RBR; 2; 19†	HUN; 1; 19	HUN; 2; 18	LEC; 1; 12	LEC; 2; 15	CAT; 1; 6	CAT; 2; 12	24th	8
2014	AVF	MNZ; 1; 8	MNZ; 2; 13	ALC; 1; 5	ALC; 2; 5	MON; 1; 6	SPA; 1 Ret	SPA; 2 Ret	MSC; 1; 2	MSC; 2; 8	NÜR; 1; 9	NÜR; 2; 5	HUN; 1 Ret	HUN; 2; 15	LEC; 1; 11	LEC; 2; 19	JER; 1; 12	JER; 2; 14	11th	66

^{†} Did not finish, but was classified as he had completed more than 90% of the race distance.

=== Complete GP2 Series results ===
(key) (Races in bold indicate pole position) (Races in italics indicate fastest lap)

Year	Entrant	1	2	3	4	5	6	7	8	9	10	11	12	13	14	15	16	17	18	19	20	21	22	DC	Points
2015	Daiko Team Lazarus	BHR; FEA; 16	BHR; SPR; 18	CAT; FEA; 17	CAT; SPR; 13	MON; FEA; 22	MON; SPR; Ret	RBR; FEA; DNS	RBR; SPR; DNS	SIL; FEA	SIL; SPR	HUN; FEA; DNS	HUN; SPR; DNS	SPA; FEA	SPA; SPR	MNZ; FEA	MNZ; SPR	SOC; FEA	SOC; SPR	BHR; FEA	BHR; SPR	YMC; FEA	YMC; SPR	29th	0

=== Complete FIA World Endurance Championship results ===
Year	Entrant	Class	Car	Engine	1	2	3	4	5	6	7	8	Rank	Points
2015	Team SARD Morand	LMP2	Morgan LMP2 Evo	SARD (Judd) 3.6 L V8	SIL	SPA; 2	LMS; Ret	NÜR	COA	FUJ	SHA	BHR	17th	18

=== 24 Hours of Le Mans results ===
Year	Team	Co-Drivers	Car	Class	Laps	Pos.	Class Pos.
2015	(Switzerland) Team SARD-Morand	(France) Pierre Ragues (United Kingdom) Oliver Webb	Morgan LMP2 Evo-SARD	LMP2	162	DNF	DNF

Sporting positions
Preceded by Nico Müller; Swiss Formula Renault 2.0	Formula Renault 2.0 MEC; Champion; 2010	Succeeded by Javier Tarancón; Formula Renault 2.0 Alps
