= 2012 Catalunya GP3 Series round =

Motor racing competition

(Spain) 2012 Catalunya GP3 round
Round details
- Round 1 of 8 rounds in the 2012 GP3 Series
- Circuit de Catalunya
- Location: Circuit de Catalunya; Montmeló, Spain
- Course: Permanent racing facility 4.665 km (2.892 mi)

GP3 Series

Race 1
- Date: 12 May 2012
- Laps: 16

Pole position
Driver	(Portugal) António Félix da Costa	Carlin
- Time: 1:38.642

Podium
First	(New Zealand) Mitch Evans	MW Arden
Second	(Philippines) Marlon Stöckinger	Status Grand Prix
Third	(Finland) Aaro Vainio	Lotus GP

Fastest lap
Driver	(Switzerland) Patric Niederhauser	Jenzer Motorsport
- Time: 1:41.440 (on lap 5)

Race 2
- Date: 13 May 2012
- Laps: 16

Podium
First	(United States) Conor Daly	Lotus GP
Second	(Romania) Robert Visoiu	Jenzer Motorsport
Third	(Finland) Matias Laine	MW Arden

Fastest lap
Driver	(Italy) Kevin Ceccon	Ocean Racing Technology
- Time: 1:40.619 (on lap 7)

The 2012 Catalunya GP3 Series round was a GP3 Series motor race held at the Circuit de Catalunya in Montmeló, Spain from 12 up to 13 May 2012 as the first round of the 2012 GP3 Series season. The race was used to support the 2012 Spanish Grand Prix.

The first GP3 feature race of the season was won by Mitch Evans with Conor Daly winning the sprint race the next day.

The weekend also saw the GP3 Series introduce the points system used by Formula One since 2010 for the feature race, with points awarded to the top ten drivers and twenty-five points awarded to the race winner. The points for the sprint race were changed too, with the winner receiving fifteen points and the top eight drivers scoring points. The points for pole and the fastest lap were doubled too.

== Classification ==
=== Qualifying ===
Pos	No.	Driver	Team	Time	Grid
1	27	(Portugal) António Félix da Costa	Carlin	1:38.642	1
2	2	(United States) Conor Daly	Lotus GP	1:38.720	2
3	3	(Finland) Aaro Vainio	Lotus GP	1:38.732	3
4	4	(New Zealand) Mitch Evans	MW Arden	1:38.835	4
5	14	(Philippines) Marlon Stöckinger	Status Grand Prix	1:38.867	5
6	9	(Cyprus) Tio Ellinas	Marussia Manor Racing	1:38.894	16^{1}
7	1	(Germany) Daniel Abt	Lotus GP	1:38.945	6
8	21	(Switzerland) Patric Niederhauser	Jenzer Motorsport	1:38.988	7
9	6	(Finland) Matias Laine	MW Arden	1:39.151	8
10	7	(Russia) Dmitry Suranovich	Marussia Manor Racing	1:39.164	9
11	5	(Italy) David Fumanelli	MW Arden	1:39.175	10
12	29	(Hungary) Tamás Pál Kiss	Atech CRS Grand Prix	1:39.201	11
13	26	(United Kingdom) Alex Brundle	Carlin	1:39.228	12
14	28	(United Kingdom) William Buller	Carlin	1:39.512	13
15	20	(Romania) Robert Visoiu	Jenzer Motorsport	1:39.553	14
16	15	(Japan) Kotaro Sakurai	Status Grand Prix	1:39.701	15
17	24	(Italy) Antonio Spavone	Trident Racing	1:39.932	17
18	16	(United Kingdom) Alice Powell	Status Grand Prix	1:40.002	18
19	8	(Brazil) Fabiano Machado	Marussia Manor Racing	1:40.278	19
20	30	(Belgium) John Wartique	Atech CRS Grand Prix	1:40.578	20
21	31	(United States) Ethan Ringel	Atech CRS Grand Prix	1:40.640	21
22	22	(Czech Republic) Jakub Klášterka	Jenzer Motorsport	1:41.053	22
23	19	(Republic of Ireland) Robert Cregan	Ocean Racing Technology	1:41.112	23
24	18	(Spain) Carmen Jordá	Ocean Racing Technology	1:42.066	24
25	23	(Italy) Vicky Piria	Trident Racing	1:43.509	25^{1}
26	17	(Italy) Kevin Ceccon	Ocean Racing Technology	no time	26

Notes:

- ^1 — Tio Ellinas and Vicky Piria were penalised by 10 grid positions after they ignored yellow flags in qualifying. Piria's grid position did not change because Kevin Ceccon did not set a time in qualifying.

=== Race 1 ===
Pos.	No.	Driver	Team	Laps	Time/Retired	Grid	Points
1	4	(New Zealand) Mitch Evans	MW Arden	16	28:38.738	4	25
2	14	(Philippines) Marlon Stöckinger	Status Grand Prix	16	+2.609	5	18
3	3	(Finland) Aaro Vainio	Lotus GP	16	+4.594	3	15
4	21	(Switzerland) Patric Niederhauser	Jenzer Motorsport	16	+5.071	7	14 (12+2)
5	6	(Finland) Matias Laine	MW Arden	16	+6.284	8	10
6	2	(United States) Conor Daly	Lotus GP	16	+6.941	2	8
7	9	(Cyprus) Tio Ellinas	Marussia Manor Racing	16	+7.419	16	6
8	20	(Romania) Robert Visoiu	Jenzer Motorsport	16	+10.102	14	4
9	5	(Italy) David Fumanelli	MW Arden	16	+11.046	10	2
10	26	(United Kingdom) Alex Brundle	Carlin	16	+11.291	12	1
11	7	(Russia) Dmitry Suranovich	Marussia Manor Racing	16	+15.105	9	
12	29	(Hungary) Tamás Pál Kiss	Atech CRS Grand Prix	16	+15.752	11	
13	1	(Germany) Daniel Abt	Lotus GP	16	+16.231	6	
14	27	(Portugal) António Félix da Costa	Carlin	16	+16.577	1	4
15	19	(Republic of Ireland) Robert Cregan	Ocean Racing Technology	16	+17.132	23	
16	8	(Brazil) Fabiano Machado	Marussia Manor Racing	16	+17.775	19	
17	24	(Italy) Antonio Spavone	Trident Racing	16	+18.284	17	
18	15	(Japan) Kotaro Sakurai	Status Grand Prix	16	+19.087	15	
19	22	(Czech Republic) Jakub Klášterka	Jenzer Motorsport	16	+19.626	22	
20	18	(Spain) Carmen Jordá	Ocean Racing Technology	16	+22.224	24	
21	30	(Belgium) John Wartique	Atech CRS Grand Prix	16	+23.070	20	
22	23	(Italy) Vicky Piria	Trident Racing	16	+32.897	25	
23	28	(United Kingdom) William Buller	Carlin	16	+46.346	13	
Ret	17	(Italy) Kevin Ceccon	Ocean Racing Technology	7	Retired	26	
Ret	31	(United States) Ethan Ringel	Atech CRS Grand Prix	0	Accident	21	
Ret	16	(United Kingdom) Alice Powell	Status Grand Prix	0	Accident	18	
Fastest lap: Patric Niederhauser (Jenzer Motorsport) — 1:41.440 (lap 5)

=== Race 2 ===
Pos.	No.	Driver	Team	Laps	Time/Retired	Grid	Points
1	2	(United States) Conor Daly	Lotus GP	16	27:21.043	3	15
2	20	(Romania) Robert Visoiu	Jenzer Motorsport	16	+3.265	1	12
3	6	(Finland) Matias Laine	MW Arden	16	+4.168	4	10
4	3	(Finland) Aaro Vainio	Lotus GP	16	+4.877	6	8
5	21	(Switzerland) Patric Niederhauser	Jenzer Motorsport	16	+5.669	5	6
6	1	(Germany) Daniel Abt	Lotus GP	16	+9.341	13	4
7	27	(Portugal) António Félix da Costa	Carlin	16	+9.688^{2}	14	2
8	26	(United Kingdom) Alex Brundle	Carlin	16	+9.833	10	1
9	28	(United Kingdom) William Buller	Carlin	16	+12.090	23	
10	17	(Italy) Kevin Ceccon	Ocean Racing Technology	16	+12.401	23	2
11	16	(United Kingdom) Alice Powell	Status Grand Prix	16	+13.664	26	
12	15	(Japan) Kotaro Sakurai	Status Grand Prix	16	+16.703	18	
13	30	(Belgium) John Wartique	Atech CRS Grand Prix	16	+21.703	21	
14	22	(Czech Republic) Jakub Klášterka	Jenzer Motorsport	16	+25.550	19	
15	9	(Cyprus) Tio Ellinas	Marussia Manor Racing	16	+28.133	2	
16	23	(Italy) Vicky Piria	Trident Racing	16	+31.239	22	
17	5	(Italy) David Fumanelli	MW Arden	16	+31.608	9	
18	31	(United States) Ethan Ringel	Atech CRS Grand Prix	16	+37.862	25	
19	14	(Philippines) Marlon Stöckinger	Status Grand Prix	16	+38.449	7	
20	4	(New Zealand) Mitch Evans	atech CRS Grand Prix	16	+51.421	8	
21	18	(Spain) Carmen Jordá	Ocean Racing Technology	16	+1:16.560	20	
Ret	8	(Brazil) Fabiano Machado	Marussia Manor Racing	12	Accident	16	
Ret	29	(Hungary) Tamás Pál Kiss	Atech CRS Grand Prix	0	Accident	12	
Ret	19	(Republic of Ireland) Robert Cregan	Ocean Racing Technology	0	Accident	15	
Ret	7	(Russia) Dmitry Suranovich	Marussia Manor Racing	0	Accident	11	
Ret	24	(Italy) Antonio Spavone	Trident Racing	0	Accident	24	
Fastest lap: Marlon Stöckinger (Status Grand Prix) — 1:40.524

Notes:

- ^2 — António Félix da Costa was given a 1-second time penalty added to his race result.

== Standings after the round ==
Drivers' Championship standings

Pos	Driver	Points
1	(New Zealand) Mitch Evans	25
2	(United States) Conor Daly	23
3	(Finland) Aaro Vainio	23
4	(Finland) Matias Laine	20
5	(Switzerland) Patric Niederhauser	20

Teams' Championship standings

Pos	Team	Points
1	(France) Lotus GP	50
2	(Australia) MW Arden	47
3	(Switzerland) Jenzer Motorsport	36
4	(Republic of Ireland) Status Grand Prix	18
5	(United Kingdom) Carlin	8

- Note: Only the top five positions are included for both sets of standings.

== See also ==
- 2012 Spanish Grand Prix
- 2012 Catalunya GP2 Series round

Previous round: 2011 Monza GP3 Series round	GP3 Series; 2012 season	Next round: 2012 Monaco GP3 Series round
Previous round: 2011 Catalunya GP3 Series round	Catalunya GP3 round	Next round: 2013 Catalunya GP3 Series round
