= 2012 Monaco GP3 Series round =

2012 Monaco GP3 round
Round details
- Round 2 of 8 rounds in the 2012 GP3 Series
- Circuit de Monaco
- Location: Circuit de Monaco
- Course: Street circuit 3.34 km (2.08 mi)

GP3 Series

Race 1
- Date: 25 May 2012
- Laps: 18

Pole position
Driver	(Finland) Aaro Vainio	Lotus GP
- Time: 1:28.008

Podium
First	(Finland) Aaro Vainio	Lotus GP
Second	(Hungary) Tamás Pál Kiss	Atech CRS Grand Prix
Third	(Italy) Kevin Ceccon	Ocean Racing Technology

Fastest lap
Driver	(Italy) Kevin Ceccon	Ocean Racing Technology
- Time: 1:28.857 (on lap 18)

Race 2
- Date: 26 May 2012
- Laps: 13

Podium
First	(Philippines) Marlon Stöckinger	Status Grand Prix
Second	(Portugal) António Félix da Costa	Carlin Motorsport
Third	(Germany) Daniel Abt	Lotus GP

Fastest lap
Driver	(Philippines) Marlon Stöckinger	Status Grand Prix
- Time: 1:28.747 (on lap 11)

The 2012 Monaco GP3 Series round was the second round of the 2012 GP3 Series season. It was held on May 24–26, 2012 at Circuit de Monaco, Monte Carlo, Monaco. The race was used to support the 2012 Monaco Grand Prix. 2012 marked the first time that the GP3 Series held at the Circuit de Monaco.

== Classification ==
=== Qualifying ===
As with the GP2 Series qualifying, qualifying for the GP3 Series race saw the drivers split into two groups. Group A was formed by cars with even numbers and Group B by those with odd numbers.

Group A

Pos.	No.	Driver	Team	Time	Grid
1	18	(Italy) Kevin Ceccon	Ocean Racing Technology	1.28.922	2
2	4	(New Zealand) Mitch Evans	MW Arden	1:29.108	4
3	14	(Philippines) Marlon Stöckinger	Status Grand Prix	1:29.152	6
4	2	(United States) Conor Daly	Lotus GP	1:29.246	8
5	28	(United Kingdom) William Buller	Carlin	1:29.757	15^{2}
6	16	(United Kingdom) Alice Powell	Status Grand Prix	1:30.400	11
7	26	(United Kingdom) Alex Brundle	Carlin	1:30.436	13
8	8	(Brazil) Fabiano Machado	Marussia Manor Racing	1:30.637	16
9	20	(Romania) Robert Visoiu	Jenzer Motorsport	1:30.782	18
10	30	(Belgium) John Wartique	Atech CRS Grand Prix	1:31.427	20
11	24	(Italy) Antonio Spavone	Trident Racing	1:31.474	22
12	22	(Czech Republic) Jakub Klášterka	Jenzer Motorsport	1:32.061	24
13	6	(Finland) Matias Laine	MW Arden	1:49.760	26

Group B

Pos.	No.	Driver	Team	Time	Grid
1	3	(Finland) Aaro Vainio	Lotus GP	1:28.008	1
2	29	(Hungary) Tamás Pál Kiss	Atech CRS Grand Prix	1:28.123	3
3	5	(Italy) David Fumanelli	MW Arden	1:28.218	5
4	1	(Germany) Daniel Abt	Lotus GP	1:28.653	7
5	27	(Portugal) António Félix da Costa	Carlin Motorsport	1:28.667	9
6	9	(Cyprus) Tio Ellinas	Marussia Manor Racing	1:29.029	10
7	15	(Japan) Kotaro Sakurai	Status Grand Prix	1:29.248	12
8	21	(Switzerland) Patric Niederhauser	Jenzer Motorsport	1:29.952	14
9	7	(Russia) Dmitry Suranovich	Marussia Manor Racing	1:30.610	17
10	23	(Italy) Vicky Piria	Trident Racing	1:31.023	19
11	31	(United States) Ethan Ringel	Atech CRS Grand Prix	1:31.144	21
12	19	(Republic of Ireland) Robert Cregan	Ocean Racing Technology	1:33.163	23
13	17	(Spain) Carmen Jordá	Ocean Racing Technology	1:34.793	25

Notes:

- ^2 — William Buller was given a five-place grid penalty for causing an avoidable accident during the second race in Barcelona.

=== Qualifying summary ===
Pos.	No.	Driver	Team	Pos.	No.	Driver	Team
1	3	(Finland) Aaro Vainio	Lotus GP				
				2	18	(Italy) Kevin Ceccon	Ocean Racing Technology
3	29	(Hungary) Tamás Pál Kiss	Atech CRS Grand Prix				
				4	4	(New Zealand) Mitch Evans	MW Arden
5	5	(Italy) David Fumanelli	MW Arden				
				6	14	(Philippines) Marlon Stöckinger	Status Grand Prix
7	1	(Germany) Daniel Abt	Lotus GP				
				8	2	(United States) Conor Daly	Lotus GP
9	27	(Portugal) António Félix da Costa	Carlin				
				10	9	(Cyprus) Tio Ellinas	Marussia Manor Racing
11	16	(United Kingdom) Alice Powell	Status Grand Prix				
				12	15	(Japan) Kotaro Sakurai	Status Grand Prix
13	26	(United Kingdom) Alex Brundle	Carlin				
				14	21	(Switzerland) Patric Niederhauser	Jenzer Motorsport
15	28	(United Kingdom) William Buller	Carlin				
				16	8	(Brazil) Fabiano Machado	Marussia Manor Racing
17	7	(Russia) Dmitry Suranovich	Marussia Manor Racing				
				18	20	(Romania) Robert Vișoiu	Jenzer Motorsport
19	23	(Italy) Vicy Piria	Trident Racing				
				20	30	(Belgium) John Wartique	Atech CRS Grand Prix
21	31	(United States) Ethan Ringel	Atech CRS Grand Prix				
				22	24	(Italy) Antonio Spavone	Trident Racing
23	19	(Republic of Ireland) Robert Cregan	Ocean Racing Technology				
				24	22	(Czech Republic) Jakub Klášterka	Jenzer Motorsport
25	17	(Spain) Carmen Jordá	Ocean Racing Technology				
				26	6	(Finland) Matias Laine	MW Arden

=== Race 1 ===
Pos.	No.	Driver	Team	Laps	Time/Retired	Grid	Points
1	3	(Finland) Aaro Vainio	Lotus GP	18	27:06.685	1	25
2	29	(Hungary) Tamás Pál Kiss	Atech CRS Grand Prix	18	+1.994	3	18
3	18	(Italy) Kevin Ceccon	Ocean Racing Technology	18	+10.519	2	17 (15+2)
4	5	(Italy) David Fumanelli	MW Arden	18	+16.156	5	12
5	4	(New Zealand) Mitch Evans	MW Arden	18	+17.789	4	10
6	1	(Germany) Daniel Abt	Lotus GP	18	+18.169	7	8
7	27	(Portugal) António Félix da Costa	Carlin Motorsport	18	+18.548	9	6
8	14	(Philippines) Marlon Stöckinger	Status Grand Prix	18	+20.440	6	4
9	9	(Cyprus) Tio Ellinas	Marussia Manor Racing	18	+20.733	10	2
10	26	(United Kingdom) Alex Brundle	Carlin	18	+25.083	13	1
11	16	(United Kingdom) Alice Powell	Status Grand Prix	18	+26.084	11	
12	28	(United Kingdom) William Buller	Carlin	18	+29.591	15	
13	15	(Japan) Kotaro Sakurai	Status Grand Prix	18	+31.319	12	
14	20	(Romania) Robert Visoiu	Jenzer Motorsport	18	+31.612	18	
15	8	(Brazil) Fabiano Machado	Marussia Manor Racing	18	+34.249	16	
16	7	(Russia) Dmitry Suranovich	Marussia Manor Racing	18	+34.851	17	
17	30	(Belgium) John Wartique	Atech CRS Grand Prix	18	+47.648	20	
18	19	(Republic of Ireland) Robert Cregan	Ocean Racing Technology	18	+57.033	23	
19	23	(Italy) Vicky Piria	Trident Racing	18	+59.726	19	
20	24	(Italy) Antonio Spavone	Trident Racing	18	+1:00.765	22	
21	6	(Finland) Matias Laine	MW Arden	18	+1:02.454	26	
22	22	(Czech Republic) Jakub Klášterka	Jenzer Motorsport	18	+1:03.565	24	
23	2	(United States) Conor Daly	Lotus GP	17	+1 lap	8	
Ret	21	(Switzerland) Patric Niederhauser	Jenzer Motorsport	8	Retired	14	
Ret	31	(United States) Ethan Ringel	Atech CRS Grand Prix	8	Retired	21	
Ret	17	(Spain) Carmen Jordá	Ocean Racing Technology	5	Retired	25	
Fastest lap: Kevin Ceccon (Ocean Racing Technology) — 1:28.857 (lap 18)

=== Race 2 ===
Pos.	No.	Driver	Team	Laps	Time/Retired	Grid	Points
1	14	(Philippines) Marlon Stöckinger	Status Grand Prix	13	21:37.673	1	17 (15+2)
2	27	(Portugal) António Félix da Costa	Carlin Motorsport	13	+0.687	2	12
3	1	(Germany) Daniel Abt	Lotus GP	13	+1.820	3	10
4	4	(New Zealand) Mitch Evans	MW Arden	13	+2.685	4	8
5	5	(Italy) David Fumanelli	MW Arden	13	+3.651	5	6
6	18	(Italy) Kevin Ceccon	Ocean Racing Technology	13	+5.337	6	4
7	3	(Finland) Aaro Vainio	Lotus GP	13	+6.266	8	2
8	9	(Cyprus) Tio Ellinas	Marussia Manor Racing	13	+7.090	9	1
9	29	(Hungary) Tamás Pál Kiss	Atech CRS Grand Prix	13	+7.762	7	
10	20	(Romania) Robert Visoiu	Jenzer Motorsport	13	+9.055	14	
11	19	(Republic of Ireland) Robert Cregan	Ocean Racing Technology	13	+1:11.406	18	
12	23	(Italy) Vicky Piria	Trident Racing	13	+1:12.106	19	
13	30	(Belgium) John Wartique	Atech CRS Grand Prix	13	+1:12.710	17	
14	24	(Italy) Antonio Spavone	Trident Racing	13	+1:13.514	20	
15	21	(Switzerland) Patric Niederhauser	Jenzer Motorsport	13	+1:14.329	24	
16	6	(Finland) Matias Laine	MW Arden	13	+1:15.267	21	
17	8	(Brazil) Fabiano Machado	Marussia Manor Racing	13	+1:16.582	15	
18	31	(United States) Ethan Ringel	Atech CRS Grand Prix	13	+1:17.725	25	
19	22	(Czech Republic) Jakub Klášterka	Jenzer Motorsport	13	+1:18.420	22	
20	15	(Japan) Kotaro Sakurai	Status Grand Prix	13	+1:19.123	13	
21	17	(Spain) Carmen Jordá	Ocean Racing Technology	13	+1:19.910	26	
22	16	(United Kingdom) Alice Powell	Status Grand Prix	13	+1:20.594	11	
Ret	2	(United States) Conor Daly	Lotus GP	10	Collision	23	
Ret	28	(United Kingdom) William Buller	Carlin Motorsport	0	Collision	12	
Ret	26	(United Kingdom) Alex Brundle	Carlin Motorsport	0	Collision	10	
DSQ	7	(Russia) Dmitry Suranovich	Marussia Manor Racing	13	(+1:10.884)^{3}	16	
Fastest lap: Marlon Stöckinger (Status Grand Prix) — 1:28.747 (lap 11)

Notes:

- — Dmitry Suranovich was excluded from the race results for ignoring the stewards' directions to pit as his car was damaged, resulting in a collision with Conor Daly.

== Standings after the round ==
Drivers' Championship standings

	Pos	Driver	Points
1	1	(Finland) Aaro Vainio	54
1	2	(New Zealand) Mitch Evans	43
3	3	(Philippines) Marlon Stöckinger	39
4	4	(Portugal) António Félix da Costa	24
3	5	(United States) Conor Daly	23

Teams' Championship standings

	Pos	Team	Points
	1	(France) Lotus GP	99
	2	(Australia) MW Arden	83
1	3	(Republic of Ireland) Status Grand Prix	39
1	4	(Switzerland) Jenzer Motorsport	36
	5	(United Kingdom) Carlin	27

- Note: Only the top five positions are included for both sets of standings.

== See also ==
- 2012 Monaco Grand Prix
- 2012 Monaco GP2 Series round

Previous round: 2012 Catalunya GP3 Series round	GP3 Series; 2012 season	Next round: 2012 Valencia GP3 Series round
Previous round: none	Monaco GP3 round	Next round: 2023 Monte Carlo Formula 3 round
