= 2012 Valencia GP3 Series round =

Third round of the 2012 GP3 Series season

(Spain) 2012 Valencia GP3 round
Round details
- Round 3 of 8 rounds in the 2012 GP3 Series
- Valencia Street Circuit
- Location: Valencia, Spain
- Course: Street circuit 5.419 km (3.367 mi)

GP3 Series

Race 1
- Date: 23 June 2012
- Laps: 14

Pole position
Driver	(New Zealand) Mitch Evans	MW Arden
- Time: 1:58.478

Podium
First	(New Zealand) Mitch Evans	MW Arden
Second	(Finland) Aaro Vainio	Lotus GP
Third	(Italy) David Fumanelli	MW Arden

Fastest lap
Driver	(New Zealand) Mitch Evans	MW Arden
- Time: 1:59.883 (on lap 12)

Race 2
- Date: 24 June 2012
- Laps: 14

Podium
First	(Switzerland) Patric Niederhauser	Jenzer Motorsport
Second	(Germany) Daniel Abt	Lotus GP
Third	(Finland) Matias Laine	MW Arden

Fastest lap
Driver	(Portugal) António Félix da Costa	Carlin
- Time: 1:59.842 (on lap 14)

The 2012 Valencia GP3 Series round was the third round of the 2012 GP3 Series season. It was held on June 24–26, 2012 at Valencia Street Circuit, Valencia, Spain. The race was used to support the 2012 European Grand Prix.

== Classification ==
=== Qualifying ===
Pos.	No.	Driver	Team	Time	Grid
1	4	(New Zealand) Mitch Evans	MW Arden	1:58.478	1
2	5	(Italy) David Fumanelli	MW Arden	1:58.511	2
3	3	(Finland) Aaro Vainio	Lotus GP	1:58.567	3
4	18	(Italy) Kevin Ceccon	Ocean Racing Technology	1:58.772	4
5	27	(Portugal) António Félix da Costa	Carlin	1:58.991	23^{5}
6	9	(Cyprus) Tio Ellinas	Marussia Manor Racing	1:59.009	5
7	2	(United States) Conor Daly	Lotus GP	1:59.015	16^{6}
8	6	(Finland) Matias Laine	MW Arden	1:59.031	6
9	14	(Philippines) Marlon Stöckinger	Status Grand Prix	1:59.091	7
10	1	(Germany) Daniel Abt	Lotus GP	1:59.276	8
11	29	(Hungary) Tamás Pál Kiss	Atech CRS Grand Prix	1:59.332	9
12	28	(United Kingdom) William Buller	Carlin	1:59.356	10
13	16	(United Kingdom) Alice Powell	Status Grand Prix	1:59.399	11
14	20	(Romania) Robert Visoiu	Jenzer Motorsport	1:59.568	12
15	8	(Brazil) Fabiano Machado	Marussia Manor Racing	1:59.708	13
16	26	(United Kingdom) Alex Brundle	Carlin	1:59.820	14
17	21	(Switzerland) Patric Niederhauser	Jenzer Motorsport	1:59.906	15
18	30	(Belgium) John Wartique	Atech CRS Grand Prix	2:00.047	17
19	7	(Russia) Dmitry Suranovich	Marussia Manor Racing	2:00.062	18
20	19	(Republic of Ireland) Robert Cregan	Ocean Racing Technology	2:00.306	19
21	24	(Italy) Antonio Spavone	Trident Racing	2:00.334	20
22	23	(Italy) Vicky Piria	Trident Racing	2:00.406	21
23	31	(United States) Ethan Ringel	Atech CRS Grand Prix	2:01.300	22
24	17	(Spain) Carmen Jordá	Ocean Racing Technology	2:02.103	24

Notes:

- ^5 — António Félix da Costa was removed from the results of the qualifying due to a technical infringement.
- ^6 — Conor Daly received a 10 place grid penalty the race before for causing an avoidable red flag.

=== Race 1 ===
Pos.	No.	Driver	Team	Laps	Time/Retired	Grid	Points
1	4	(New Zealand) Mitch Evans	MW Arden	14	28:13.357	1	31 (25+4+2)
2	3	(Finland) Aaro Vainio	Lotus GP	14	+2.190	3	18
3	5	(Italy) David Fumanelli	MW Arden	14	+12.571	2	15
4	9	(Cyprus) Tio Ellinas	Marussia Manor Racing	14	+13.483	5	12
5	6	(Finland) Matias Laine	MW Arden	14	+16.515	6	10
6	1	(Germany) Daniel Abt	Lotus GP	14	+18.748	8	8
7	18	(Italy) Kevin Ceccon	Ocean Racing Technology	14	+18.833	4	6
8	14	(Switzerland) Patric Niederhauser	Jenzer Motorsport	14	+24.336	7	4
9	29	(Hungary) Tamás Pál Kiss	Atech CRS Grand Prix	14	+27.082	9	2
10	28	(United Kingdom) William Buller	Carlin	14	+31.834	10	1
11	2	(United States) Conor Daly	Lotus GP	14	+32.279	16	
12	30	(Belgium) John Wartique	Atech CRS Grand Prix	14	+33.476	17	
13	17	(Spain) Carmen Jordá	Ocean Racing Technology	14	+47.838	24	
14	31	(United States) Ethan Ringel	Atech CRS Grand Prix	14	+52.330	22	
15	19	(Republic of Ireland) Robert Cregan	Ocean Racing Technology	14	+54.192	19	
16	26	(United Kingdom) Alex Brundle	Carlin	14	+74.964	14	
17	23	(Italy) Vicky Piria	Trident Racing	14	+78.561	21	
18	16	(United Kingdom) Alice Powell	Status Grand Prix	14	+91.567	11	
19	21	(Philippines) Marlon Stöckinger	Status Grand Prix	13	+1 Lap	15	
Ret	7	(Russia) Dmitry Suranovich	Marussia Manor Racing	2	Retired	18	
Ret	27	(Portugal) António Félix da Costa	Carlin	2	Retired	23	
Ret	20	(Romania) Robert Visoiu	Jenzer Motorsport	0	Retired	12	
Ret	8	(Brazil) Fabiano Machado	Marussia Manor Racing	0	Retired	13	
Ret	24	(Italy) Antonio Spavone	Trident Racing	0	Retired	20	
Fastest lap: Mitch Evans (MW Arden) — 1:59.883 (lap 12)

=== Race 2 ===
Pos.	No.	Driver	Team	Laps	Time/Retired	Grid	Points
1	21	(Switzerland) Patric Niederhauser	Jenzer Motorsport	13	28:13.702	1	15
2	1	(Germany) Daniel Abt	Lotus GP	14	+0.924	3	12
3	6	(Finland) Matias Laine	MW Arden	14	+6.314	4	10
4	18	(Italy) Kevin Ceccon	Ocean Racing Technology	14	+6.589	2	8
5	9	(Cyprus) Tio Ellinas	Marussia Manor Racing	14	+6.938^{7}	5	6
6	4	(New Zealand) Mitch Evans	MW Arden	14	+6.940	8	4
7	3	(Finland) Aaro Vainio	Lotus GP	14	+9.959	7	2
8	27	(Portugal) António Félix da Costa	Carlin	14	+15.020	24^{8}	(1+2)
9	28	(United Kingdom) William Buller	Carlin	14	+19.751	10	
10	29	(Hungary) Tamás Pál Kiss	Atech CRS Grand Prix	14	+23.761	9	
11	14	(Philippines) Marlon Stöckinger	Status Grand Prix	14	+24.396	19	
12	20	(Romania) Robert Visoiu	Jenzer Motorsport	14	+26.251	21	
13	19	(Republic of Ireland) Robert Cregan	Ocean Racing Technology	14	+26.330	15	
14	26	(United Kingdom) Alex Brundle	Carlin	14	+28.954	16	
15	7	(Russia) Dmitry Suranovich	Marussia Manor Racing	14	+33.481	20	
16	5	(Italy) David Fumanelli	MW Arden	14	+34.148	6	
17	24	(Italy) Antonio Spavone	Trident Racing	14	+37.558	23	
18	23	(Italy) Vicky Piria	Trident Racing	14	+46.606	17	
19	8	(Brazil) Fabiano Machado	Marussia Manor Racing	14	+56.689	22	
Ret	17	(Spain) Carmen Jordá	Ocean Racing Technology	8	Retired	13	
Ret	31	(United States) Ethan Ringel	Atech CRS Grand Prix	2	Retired	14	
Ret	30	(Belgium) John Wartique	Atech CRS Grand Prix	0	Retired	12	
Ret	2	(United States) Conor Daly	Lotus GP	0	Retired	11	
Ret	16	(United Kingdom) Alice Powell	Status Grand Prix	0	Retired	18	
Fastest lap: António Félix da Costa (Carlin) — 1:59.842 (lap 14)

Notes:

- ^7 — Tio Ellinas was given a one-second time penalty added to his race result after contact between him and Kevin Ceccon, dropping him from third to fifth.
- ^8 — António Félix da Costa had a ten place grid penalty for the sprint race after causing an avoidable collision in the sprint race.

== Standings after the round ==
Drivers' Championship standings

	Pos	Driver	Points
1	1	(New Zealand) Mitch Evans	78
1	2	(Finland) Aaro Vainio	74
4	3	(Germany) Daniel Abt	42
4	4	(Finland) Matias Laine	40
2	5	(Philippines) Marlon Stöckinger	39

Teams' Championship standings

	Pos	Team	Points
1	1	(Australia) MW Arden	153
1	2	(France) Lotus GP	139
1	3	(Switzerland) Jenzer Motorsport	55
1	4	(Republic of Ireland) Status Grand Prix	39
1	5	(Portugal) Ocean Racing Technology	37

- Note: Only the top five positions are included for both sets of standings.

== See also ==
- 2012 European Grand Prix
- 2012 Valencia GP2 Series round

Previous round: 2012 Monaco GP3 Series round	GP3 Series; 2012 season	Next round: 2012 Silverstone GP3 Series round
Previous round: 2011 Valencia GP3 Series round	Valencia GP3 round	Next round: none
