= 2012 Silverstone GP3 Series round =

(United Kingdom) 2012 Silverstone GP3 round
Round details
- Round 4 of 8 rounds in the 2012 GP3 Series
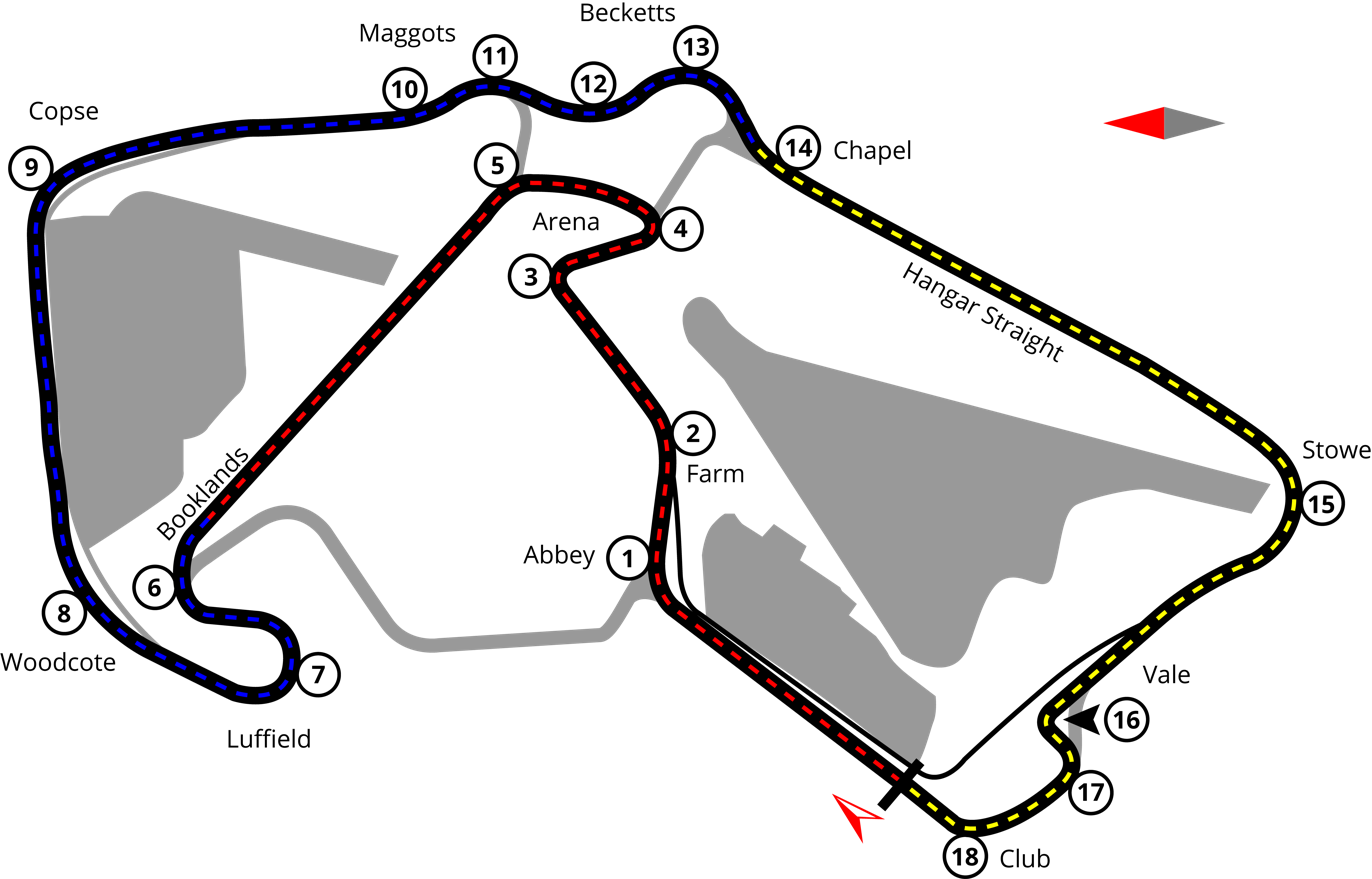
- Silverstone Circuit
- Location: Silverstone Circuit, Northamptonshire and Buckinghamshire, England
- Course: Permanent racing circuit 5.901 km (3.667 mi)

GP3 Series

Race 1
- Date: 7 July 2012
- Laps: 14

Pole position
Driver	(New Zealand) Mitch Evans	MW Arden
- Time: 1:51.892

Podium
First	(Portugal) António Félix da Costa	Carlin
Second	(New Zealand) Mitch Evans	MW Arden
Third	(Finland) Aaro Vainio	Lotus GP

Fastest lap
Driver	(Portugal) António Félix da Costa	Carlin
- Time: 1:53.951 (on lap 13)

Race 2
- Date: 8 July 2012
- Laps: 14

Podium
First	(United Kingdom) William Buller	Carlin
Second	(United States) Conor Daly	Lotus GP
Third	(Switzerland) Patric Niederhauser	Jenzer Motorsport

Fastest lap
Driver	(Cyprus) Tio Ellinas	Marussia Manor Racing
- Time: 1:59.829 (on lap 14)

The 2012 Silverstone GP3 Series round was a GP3 Series motor race held on 7 and 8 July 2012 at Silverstone Circuit in Silverstone, United Kingdom. It was the fourth round of the 2012 GP3 Season. The race supported the 2012 British Grand Prix.

Trident Racing entered a third car for Giovanni Venturini in the GP3 category, making the Silverstone rounds the first time the GP3 Series had been run with a full twenty-seven car grid in 2012.

== Classification ==
=== Qualifying ===
Pos.	No.	Driver	Team	Time	Grid
1	4	(New Zealand) Mitch Evans	MW Arden	1:51.892	1
2	3	(Finland) Aaro Vainio	Lotus GP	1:52.216	2
3	27	(Portugal) António Félix da Costa	Carlin	1:52.233	3
4	6	(Finland) Matias Laine	MW Arden	1:52.332	4
5	2	(United States) Conor Daly	Lotus GP	1:52.519	5
6	1	(Germany) Daniel Abt	Lotus GP	1:52.543	6
7	18	(Italy) Kevin Ceccon	Ocean Racing Technology	1:52.572	7
8	28	(United Kingdom) William Buller	Carlin	1:52.648	8
9	15	(Philippines) Kotaro Sakurai	Status Grand Prix	1:52.807	9
10	5	(Italy) David Fumanelli	MW Arden	1:52.921	12^{1}
11	29	(Hungary) Tamás Pál Kiss	ATECH CRS Grand Prix	1:52.930	21^{2}
12	26	(United Kingdom) Alex Brundle	Carlin	1:53.133	10
13	9	(Cyprus) Tio Ellinas	Marussia Manor Racing	1:53.536	11
14	22	(Argentina) Facu Regalia	Jenzer Motorsport	1:53.549	13
15	25	(Italy) Giovanni Venturini	Trident Racing	1:53.624	14
16	23	(Italy) Vicky Piria	Trident Racing	1:53.769	15
17	16	(United Kingdom) Alice Powell	Status Grand Prix	1:53.852	18^{1}
18	20	(Romania) Robert Visoiu	Jenzer Motorsport	1:53.861	16
19	21	(Switzerland) Patric Niederhauser	Jenzer Motorsport	1:53.893	17
20	7	(Russia) Dmitry Suranovich	Marussia Manor Racing	1:54.324	19
21	24	(Italy) Antonio Spavone	Trident Racing	1:54.339	20
22	8	(Brazil) Fabiano Machado	Marussia Manor Racing	1:54.427	22
23	30	(Brazil) Fabio Gamberini	ATECH CRS Grand Prix	1:55.175	23
24	19	(Republic of Ireland) Robert Cregan	Ocean Racing Technology	1:55.363	24
25	14	(Philippines) Marlon Stöckinger	Status Grand Prix	1:55.711	25
26	31	(United States) Ethan Ringel	ATECH CRS Grand Prix	1:59.371	26^{3}
—	17	(Spain) Carmen Jordá	Ocean Racing Technology	1:59.989	—^{4}

Notes:

- ^1 — David Fumanelli and Alice Powell were both given two place grid penalties for taking the chequered flag twice at the end of the Qualifying session.
- ^2 — Tamás Pál Kiss wash given a ten-place grid penalty for ignoring yellow flags during the first practice session.
- ^3 — Ethan Ringel was given a ten-place grid penalty for ignoring yellow flags during the first practice session. He later received a two-place grid penalty for taking the chequered flag twice at the end of qualifying. As Ringel qualified twenty-sixth of the twenty-six drivers to set a lap time, and so started the feature race from the back of the grid.
- ^4 — Carmen Jordá was given a two-place grid penalty for taking the chequered flag twice at the end of qualifying. However, as she did not set a lap time within 107% of Mitch Evans' pole position time, she was not given permission to start the race.

=== Race 1 ===
Pos.	No.	Driver	Team	Laps	Time/Retired	Grid	Points
1	27	(Portugal) António Félix da Costa	Carlin	14	27:14.410	3	27 (25+2)
2	4	(New Zealand) Mitch Evans	MW Arden	14	+7.062	1	22 (18+4)
3	3	(Finland) Aaro Vainio	Lotus GP	14	+8.783	2	15
4	1	(Germany) Daniel Abt	Lotus GP	14	+16.136	6	12
5	2	(United States) Conor Daly	Lotus GP	14	+22.156	5	10
6	9	(Cyprus) Tio Ellinas	Marussia Manor Racing	14	+22.325	11	8
7	26	(United Kingdom) Alex Brundle	Carlin	14	+38.448	10	6
8	18	(Italy) Kevin Ceccon	Ocean Racing Technology	14	+41.719	7	4
9	6	(Finland) Matias Laine	MW Arden	14	+42.314	4	2
10	21	(Switzerland) Patric Niederhauser	Jenzer Motorsport	14	+44.489	17	1
11	29	(Hungary) Tamás Pál Kiss	ATECH CRS Grand Prix	14	+53.795	21	
12	20	(Romania) Robert Visoiu	Jenzer Motorsport	14	+60.061	16	
13	25	(Italy) Giovanni Venturini	Trident Racing	14	+62.451	14	
14	22	(Argentina) Facu Regalia	Jenzer Motorsport	14	+63.081	13	
15	15	(Philippines) Kotaro Sakurai	Status Grand Prix	14	+65.140	9	
16	14	(Philippines) Marlon Stöckinger	Status Grand Prix	14	+72.707	25	
17	16	(United Kingdom) Alice Powell	Status Grand Prix	14	+86.048	18	
18	23	(Italy) Vicky Piria	Trident Racing	14	+1:34.318	15	
19	8	(Brazil) Fabiano Machado	Marussia Manor Racing	14	+1:38.754	22	
20	19	(Republic of Ireland) Robert Cregan	Ocean Racing Technology	14	+1:39.170	24	
21	24	(Italy) Antonio Spavone	Trident Racing	14	+1:39.960	20	
22	7	(Russia) Dmitry Suranovich	Marussia Manor Racing	14	+1:40.812	19	
23	30	(Brazil) Fabio Gamberini	ATECH CRS Grand Prix	13	+1 lap	23	
Ret	31	(United States) Ethan Ringel	ATECH CRS Grand Prix	2	Retired	26	
Ret	28	(United Kingdom) William Buller	Carlin	0	Retired	8	
DNS	5	(Italy) David Fumanelli	MW Arden	0	Did not start	12	
DNQ	17	(Spain) Carmen Jordá	Ocean Racing Technology	0	Did not qualify	—	
Fastest lap: António Félix da Costa (Carlin) — 1:53.951 (on lap 13)

=== Race 2 ===
Pos.	No.	Driver	Team	Laps	Time/Retired	Grid	Points
1	28	(United Kingdom) William Buller	Carlin	14	29:49.526	25	15
2	2	(United States) Conor Daly	Lotus GP	14	+8.577	4	12
3	21	(Switzerland) Patric Niederhauser	Jenzer Motorsport	14	+30.017	10	10
4	9	(Cyprus) Tio Ellinas	Marussia Manor Racing	14	+37.529	3	10 (8+2)
5	20	(Romania) Robert Visoiu	Jenzer Motorsport	14	+52.038	15^{1}	6
6	27	(Portugal) António Félix da Costa	Carlin	14	+1:03.722	8	4
7	18	(Italy) Kevin Ceccon	Ocean Racing Technology	14	+1:05.954	1	2
8	30	(Brazil) Fabio Gamberini	ATECH CRS Grand Prix	14	+1:06.482	23	1
9	8	(Brazil) Fabiano Machado	Marussia Manor Racing	14	+1:07.321	19	
10	26	(United Kingdom) Alex Brundle	Carlin	14	+1:20.941	2	
11	4	(New Zealand) Mitch Evans	MW Arden	14	+1:22.894	7	
12	22	(Argentina) Facu Regalia	Jenzer Motorsport	14	+1:23.503	13	
13	15	(Philippines) Kotaro Sakurai	Status Grand Prix	14	+1:24.203	14	
14	29	(Hungary) Tamás Pál Kiss	ATECH CRS Grand Prix	14	+1:28.143	11	
15	19	(Republic of Ireland) Robert Cregan	Ocean Racing Technology	14	+1:44.079	20	
16	25	(Italy) Giovanni Venturini	Trident Racing	14	+1:52.408	12	
17	31	(United States) Ethan Ringel	ATECH CRS Grand Prix	14	+1:54.151	24	
18	6	(Finland) Matias Laine	MW Arden	13	Retired	9	
19	24	(Italy) Antonio Spavone	Trident Racing	13	Retired	21	
20	7	(Russia) Dmitry Suranovich	Marussia Manor Racing	12	Retired	22	
21	23	(Italy) Vicky Piria	Trident Racing	12	Retired	18	
Ret	1	(Germany) Daniel Abt	Lotus GP	11	Retired	5	
Ret	14	(Philippines) Marlon Stöckinger	Status Grand Prix	11	Retired	16	
Ret	3	(Finland) Aaro Vainio	Lotus GP	11	Retired	6	
Ret	16	(United Kingdom) Alice Powell	Status Grand Prix	9	Retired	17	
DNS	5	(Italy) David Fumanelli	MW Arden	0	Did not start	12	
DNQ	17	(Spain) Carmen Jordá	Ocean Racing Technology	0	Did not qualify	—	
Fastest lap: Tio Ellinas (Marussia Manor Racing) — 1:59.829 (on lap 14)

Notes:

- ^1 — Robert Visoiu finished Race 1 in twelfth position, but received a three-place grid penalty for crossing the finish line twice at the end of the race, and so started Race 2 from fifteenth position.

== Standings after the round ==
Drivers' Championship standings

	Pos	Driver	Points
	1	(New Zealand) Mitch Evans	100
	2	(Finland) Aaro Vainio	89
6	3	(Portugal) António Félix da Costa	58
1	4	(Germany) Daniel Abt	54
1	5	(Switzerland) Patric Niederhauser	50

Teams' Championship standings

	Pos	Team	Points
1	1	(France) Lotus GP	188
1	2	(Australia) MW Arden	177
3	3	(United Kingdom) Carlin	83
1	4	(Switzerland) Jenzer Motorsport	72
2	5	(United Kingdom) Marussia Manor Racing	45

- Note: Only the top five positions are included for both sets of standings.

== See also ==
- 2012 British Grand Prix
- 2012 Silverstone GP2 Series round

Previous round: 2012 Valencia GP3 Series round	GP3 Series; 2012 season	Next round: 2012 Hockenheimring GP3 Series round
Previous round: 2011 Silverstone GP3 Series round	Silverstone GP3 round	Next round: 2013 Silverstone GP3 Series round
