= 2012 Spa-Francorchamps GP3 Series round =

(Belgium) 2012 Spa-Francorchamps GP3 round
Round details
- Round 7 of 8 rounds in the 2012 GP3 Series
- Layout of the Circuit de Spa-Francorchamps
- Location: Circuit de Spa-Francorchamps, Francorchamps, Wallonia, Belgium
- Course: Permanent racing facility 7.004 km (4.352 mi)

GP3 Series

Race 1
- Date: 1 September 2012
- Laps: 4

Pole position
Driver	(New Zealand) Mitch Evans	MW Arden
- Time: 2:10.513

Podium
First	(Germany) Daniel Abt	Lotus GP
Second	(Portugal) António Félix da Costa	Carlin
Third	(New Zealand) Mitch Evans	MW Arden

Fastest lap
Driver	(Portugal) António Félix da Costa	Carlin
- Time: 2:12.259 (on lap 2)

Race 2
- Date: 2 September 2012
- Laps: 12

Podium
First	(Finland) Matias Laine	MW Arden
Second	(Portugal) António Félix da Costa	Carlin
Third	(United States) Conor Daly	Lotus GP

Fastest lap
Driver	(Portugal) António Félix da Costa	Carlin
- Time: 2:12.004 (on lap 10)

The 2012 Spa-Francorchamps GP3 Series round was a GP3 Series motor race held on September 1 and 2, 2012 at Circuit de Spa-Francorchamps, Belgium. It was the seventh round of the 2012 GP3 Series. The race supported the 2012 Belgian Grand Prix.

== Classification ==
=== Qualifying ===
Pos.	No.	Driver	Team	Time	Grid
1	4	(New Zealand) Mitch Evans	MW Arden	2:10.513	1
2	6	(Finland) Matias Laine	MW Arden	2:10.738	2
3	1	(Germany) Daniel Abt	Lotus GP	2:10.754	3
4	27	(Portugal) António Félix da Costa	Carlin	2:10.980	4
5	2	(United States) Conor Daly	Lotus GP	2:11.064	5
6	15	(United Kingdom) Lewis Williamson	Status Grand Prix	2:11.320	6
7	3	(Finland) Aaro Vainio	Lotus GP	2:11.366	7
8	25	(Italy) Giovanni Venturini	Trident Racing	2:11.382	8
9	22	(Switzerland) Alex Fontana	Jenzer Motorsport	2:11.397	9
10	9	(Cyprus) Tio Ellinas	Marussia Manor Racing	2:11.501	10
11	14	(Philippines) Marlon Stöckinger	Status Grand Prix	2:11.541	11
12	21	(Switzerland) Patric Niederhauser	Jenzer Motorsport	2:11.637	12
13	23	(Italy) Vicky Piria	Trident Racing	2:11.723	13
14	28	(United Kingdom) William Buller	Carlin	2:11.742	14
15	18	(Italy) Kevin Ceccon	Ocean Racing Technology	2:11.746	15
16	5	(Italy) David Fumanelli	MW Arden	2:11.804	16
17	26	(United Kingdom) Alex Brundle	Carlin	2:12.224	17
18	20	(Romania) Robert Visoiu	Jenzer Motorsport	2:12.410	18
19	29	(Hungary) Tamás Pál Kiss	Atech CRS Grand Prix	2:12.508	19
20	16	(United Kingdom) Alice Powell	Status Grand Prix	2:12.530	20
21	31	(United States) Ethan Ringel	Atech CRS Grand Prix	2:12.713	24
22	19	(Republic of Ireland) Robert Cregan	Ocean Racing Technology	2:12.765	21
23	7	(Russia) Dmitry Suranovich	Marussia Manor Racing	2:12.886	22
24	8	(Brazil) Fabiano Machado	Marussia Manor Racing	2:12.917	23
25	30	(Belgium) John Wartique	Atech CRS Grand Prix	2:13.478	25
26	17	(Spain) Carmen Jordá	Ocean Racing Technology	2:18.719	26

=== Race 1 ===
Pos.	No.	Driver	Team	Laps	Time/Retired	Grid	Points
1	1	(Germany) Daniel Abt	Lotus GP	4	8:54.720	3	12.5
2	27	(Portugal) António Félix da Costa	Carlin	4	+0.321	4	11 (9+2)
3	4	(New Zealand) Mitch Evans	MW Arden	4	+1.410	1	11.5 (7.5+4)
4	9	(Cyprus) Tio Ellinas	Marussia Manor Racing	4	+1.971	10	6
5	6	(Finland) Matias Laine	MW Arden	4	+2.655	2	5
6	3	(Finland) Aaro Vainio	Lotus GP	4	+3.157	7	4
7	2	(United States) Conor Daly	Lotus GP	4	+4.679	5	3
8	15	(United Kingdom) Lewis Williamson	Status Grand Prix	4	+6.081	6	2
9	25	(Italy) Giovanni Venturini	Trident Racing	4	+7.024	8	1
10	22	(Switzerland) Alex Fontana	Jenzer Motorsport	4	+7.584	9	0.5
11	21	(Switzerland) Patric Niederhauser	Jenzer Motorsport	4	+9.396	12	
12	18	(Italy) Kevin Ceccon	Ocean Racing Technology	4	+10.170	15	
13	28	(United Kingdom) William Buller	Carlin	4	+10.790	14	
14	14	(Philippines) Marlon Stöckinger	Status Grand Prix	4	+11.119	11	
15	20	(Romania) Robert Visoiu	Jenzer Motorsport	4	+13.438	18	
16	23	(Italy) Vicky Piria	Trident Racing	4	+15.145	13	
17	29	(Hungary) Tamás Pál Kiss	Atech CRS Grand Prix	4	+16.967	19	
18	16	(United Kingdom) Alice Powell	Status Grand Prix	4	+18.793	20	
19	26	(United Kingdom) Alex Brundle	Carlin	4	+19.166	17	
20	5	(Italy) David Fumanelli	MW Arden	4	+19.480	16	
21	19	(Republic of Ireland) Robert Cregan	Ocean Racing Technology	4	+19.787	21	
22	7	(Russia) Dmitry Suranovich	Marussia Manor Racing	4	+20.844	22	
23	30	(Belgium) John Wartique	Atech CRS Grand Prix	4	+22.634	25	
24	31	(United States) Ethan Ringel	Atech CRS Grand Prix	4	+23.445	24	
25	8	(Brazil) Fabiano Machado	Marussia Manor Racing	4	+24.117	23	
26	17	(Spain) Carmen Jordá	Ocean Racing Technology	4	+27.131	26	
Fastest lap: António Félix da Costa (Carlin) — 2:12.259 (on lap 2)

=== Race 2 ===
Pos.	No.	Driver	Team	Laps	Time/Retired	Grid	Points
1	6	(Finland) Matias Laine	MW Arden	12	26:39.329	4	15
2	27	(Portugal) António Félix da Costa	Carlin	12	+2.404	7	14 (12+2)
3	2	(United States) Conor Daly	Lotus GP	12	+3.460	2	10
4	22	(Switzerland) Alex Fontana	Jenzer Motorsport	12	+7.151	10	8
5	1	(Germany) Daniel Abt	Lotus GP	12	+8.494	8	6
6	21	(Switzerland) Patric Niederhauser	Jenzer Motorsport	12	+9.671	11	4
7	15	(United Kingdom) Lewis Williamson	Status Grand Prix	12	+10.961	1	2
8	28	(United Kingdom) William Buller	Carlin	12	+17.259	13	1
9	25	(Italy) Giovanni Venturini	Trident Racing	12	+18.754	9	
10	29	(Hungary) Tamás Pál Kiss	Atech CRS Grand Prix	12	+19.460	17	
11	26	(United Kingdom) Alex Brundle	Carlin	12	+19.828	19	
12	16	(United Kingdom) Alice Powell	Status Grand Prix	12	+22.462	18	
13	20	(Romania) Robert Visoiu	Jenzer Motorsport	12	+23.628	15	
14	3	(Finland) Aaro Vainio	Lotus GP	12	+26.226	3	
15	4	(New Zealand) Mitch Evans	MW Arden	12	+28.547	6	
16	14	(Philippines) Marlon Stöckinger	Status Grand Prix	12	+29.267	14	
17	30	(Belgium) John Wartique	Atech CRS Grand Prix	12	+29.469	23	
18	7	(Russia) Dmitry Suranovich	Marussia Manor Racing	12	+30.471	22	
19	23	(Italy) Vicky Piria	Trident Racing	12	+31.849	16	
20	18	(Italy) Kevin Ceccon	Ocean Racing Technology	12	+33.410	12	
21	8	(Brazil) Fabiano Machado	Marussia Manor Racing	12	+33.967	25	
22	31	(United States) Ethan Ringel	Atech CRS Grand Prix	12	+34.451	24	
23	17	(Spain) Carmen Jordá	Ocean Racing Technology	12	+54.689	26	
Ret	5	(Italy) David Fumanelli	MW Arden	6	Retired	20	
Ret	9	(Cyprus) Tio Ellinas	Marussia Manor Racing	4	Collision Damage	5	
DNS	19	(Republic of Ireland) Robert Cregan	Ocean Racing Technology	0	Injured After Accident	—	
Fastest lap: António Félix da Costa (Carlin) — 2:12.004 (on lap 10)

== Standings after the round ==
Drivers' Championship standings

	Pos	Driver	Points
	1	(New Zealand) Mitch Evans	147.5
1	2	(Portugal) António Félix da Costa	126
1	3	(Finland) Aaro Vainio	123
	4	(Germany) Daniel Abt	112.5
1	5	(United States) Conor Daly	94

Teams' Championship standings

Pos	Team	Points
1	(France) Lotus GP	329.5
2	(Australia) MW Arden	276.5
3	(United Kingdom) Carlin	164
4	(Switzerland) Jenzer Motorsport	121.5
5	(United Kingdom) Marussia Manor Racing	64

- Note: Only the top five positions are included for both sets of standings.

== See also ==
- 2012 Belgian Grand Prix
- 2012 Spa-Francorchamps GP2 Series round

Previous round: 2012 Hungaroring GP3 Series round	GP3 Series; 2012 season	Next round: 2012 Monza GP3 Series round
Previous round: 2011 Spa-Francorchamps GP3 Series round	Spa-Francorchamps GP3 round	Next round: 2013 Spa-Francorchamps GP3 Series round
