= 2012 Hungaroring GP3 Series round =

Motor racing competition

(Hungary) 2012 Hungaroring GP3 round
Round details
- Round 6 of 8 rounds in the 2012 GP3 Series
- Layout of the Hungaroring circuit
- Location: Hungaroring, Mogyoród, Hungary
- Course: Permanent racing facility 4.381 km (2.722 mi)

GP3 Series

Race 1
- Date: 28 July 2012
- Laps: 16

Pole position
Driver	(Finland) Aaro Vainio	Lotus GP
- Time: 1:36.052

Podium
First	(Portugal) António Félix da Costa	Carlin
Second	(Germany) Daniel Abt	Lotus GP
Third	(New Zealand) Mitch Evans	MW Arden

Fastest lap
Driver	(Portugal) António Félix da Costa	Carlin
- Time: 1:37.899 (on lap 15)

Race 2
- Date: 29 July 2012
- Laps: 16

Podium
First	(Portugal) António Félix da Costa	Carlin
Second	(Switzerland) Patric Niederhauser	Jenzer Motorsport
Third	(United Kingdom) Alex Brundle	Carlin

Fastest lap
Driver	(New Zealand) Mitch Evans	MW Arden
- Time: 1:40.097 (on lap 16)

The 2012 Hungaroring GP3 Series round was a GP3 Series motor race held on July 28 and 29, 2012 at Hungaroring, Hungary. It was the sixth round of the 2012 GP3 season. The race supported the 2012 Hungarian Grand Prix.

With António Félix da Costa winning Race 1 and Race 2 respectively, it marked the first time in the series' history that a driver was able to win two races in a weekend.

== Classification ==
=== Qualifying ===
Pos.	No.	Driver	Team	Time	Grid
1	3	(Finland) Aaro Vainio	Lotus GP	1:36.052	1
2	27	(Portugal) António Félix da Costa	Carlin	1:36.301	2
3	4	(New Zealand) Mitch Evans	MW Arden	1:36.381	3
4	14	(Philippines) Marlon Stöckinger	Status Grand Prix	1:36.478	4
5	5	(Italy) David Fumanelli	MW Arden	1:36.541	5
6	1	(Germany) Daniel Abt	Lotus GP	1:36.569	6
7	2	(United States) Conor Daly	Lotus GP	1:36.783	7
8	18	(Italy) Kevin Ceccon	Ocean Racing Technology	1:36.807	8
9	6	(Finland) Matias Laine	MW Arden	1:36.866	9
10	21	(Switzerland) Patric Niederhauser	Jenzer Motorsport	1:36.867	10
11	20	(Romania) Robert Visoiu	Jenzer Motorsport	1:36.967	11
12	28	(United Kingdom) William Buller	Carlin	1:37.065	12
13	15	(United Kingdom) Lewis Williamson	Status Grand Prix	1:37.066	13
14	25	(Italy) Giovanni Venturini	Trident Racing	1:37.264	14
15	9	(Cyprus) Tio Ellinas	Marussia Manor Racing	1:37.282	15
16	26	(United Kingdom) Alex Brundle	Carlin	1:37.612	16
17	30	(Argentina) Facu Regalia	Atech CRS Grand Prix	1:37.625	17
18	22	(Switzerland) Alex Fontana	Jenzer Motorsport	1:37.661	18
19	16	(United Kingdom) Alice Powell	Status Grand Prix	1:37.730	19
20	29	(Hungary) Tamás Pál Kiss	Atech CRS Grand Prix	1:37.882	20
21	7	(Russia) Dmitry Suranovich	Marussia Manor Racing	1:38.528	21
22	19	(Republic of Ireland) Robert Cregan	Ocean Racing Technology	1:38.560	22
23	8	(Brazil) Fabiano Machado	Marussia Manors Racing	1:38.671	23
24	31	(United States) Ethan Ringel	Atech CRS Grand Prix	1:38.706	24
25	23	(Italy) Vicky Piria	Trident Racing	1:38.974	25
26	17	(Spain) Carmen Jordá	Ocean Racing Technology	1:41.809	26

=== Race 1 ===
Pos.	No.	Driver	Team	Laps	Time/Retired	Grid	Points
1	27	(Portugal) António Félix da Costa	Carlin	16	26:33.107	2	27 (25+2)
2	1	(Germany) Daniel Abt	Lotus GP	16	+4.410	6	18
3	4	(New Zealand) Mitch Evans	MW Arden	16	+4.747	3	15
4	18	(Italy) Kevin Ceccon	Ocean Racing Technology	16	+8.674	8	12
5	3	(Finland) Aaro Vainio	Lotus GP	16	+9.681	1	14 (10+4)
6	2	(United States) Conor Daly	Lotus GP	16	+10.404	7	8
7	6	(Finland) Matias Laine	MW Arden	16	+11.025	9	6
8	5	(Italy) David Fumanelli	MW Arden	16	+12.928	5	4
9	14	(Philippines) Marlon Stöckinger	Status Grand Prix	16	+13.338	4	2
10	15	(United Kingdom) Lewis Williamson	Status Grand Prix	16	+14.257	13	1
11	25	(Italy) Giovanni Venturini	Trident Racing	16	+17.448	14	
12	20	(Romania) Robert Visoiu	Jenzer Motorsport	16	+18.531	11	
13	9	(Cyprus) Tio Ellinas	Marussia Manor Racing	16	+20.984	15	
14	29	(Hungary) Tamás Pál Kiss	Atech CRS Grand Prix	16	+21.482	20	
15	26	(United Kingdom) Alex Brundle	Carlin	16	+23.338	16	
16	21	(Switzerland) Patric Niederhauser	Jenzer Motorsport	16	+24.770	10	
17	22	(Switzerland) Alex Fontana	Jenzer Motorsport	16	+28.400	18	
18	30	(Argentina) Facu Regalia	Atech CRS Grand Prix	16	+32.508	17	
19	16	(United Kingdom) Alice Powell	Status Grand Prix	16	+32.988	19	
20	23	(Italy) Vicky Piria	Trident Racing	16	+41.678	25	
21	19	(Republic of Ireland) Robert Cregan	Ocean Racing Technology	16	+44.872	22	
22	31	(United States) Ethan Ringel	Atech CRS Grand Prix	16	+48.844	24	
23	28	(United Kingdom) William Buller	Carlin	16	+1:30.888	12	
24	17	(Spain) Carmen Jordá	Ocean Racing Technology	14	Retired	26	
Ret	7	(Russia) Dmitry Suranovich	Marussia Manor Racing	3	Retired	21	
DNS	8	(Brazil) Fabiano Machado	Marussia Manor Racing	0	did not start	23	
Fastest lap: António Félix da Costa (Carlin) — 1:37.899 (on lap 15)

=== Race 2 ===
Pos.	No.	Driver	Team	Laps	Time/Retired	Grid	Points
1	27	(Portugal) António Félix da Costa	Carlin	16	30:36.220	8	17 (15+2)
2	21	(Switzerland) Patric Niederhauser	Jenzer Motorsport	16	+11.071	16	12
3	26	(United Kingdom) Alex Brundle	Carlin	16	+13.440	15	10
4	9	(Cyprus) Tio Ellinas	Marussia Manor Racing	16	+18.987	13	8
5	15	(United Kingdom) Lewis Williamson	Status Grand Prix	16	+19.505	10	6
6	6	(Finland) Matias Laine	MW Arden	16	+21.609	2	4
7	3	(Finland) Aaro Vainio	Lotus GP	16	+22.052	4	2
8	18	(Italy) Kevin Ceccon	Ocean Racing Technology	16	+25.392	5	1
9	2	(United States) Conor Daly	Lotus GP	16	+29.260	3	
10	29	(Hungary) Tamás Pál Kiss	Atech CRS Grand Prix	16	+32.289	14	
11	1	(Germany) Daniel Abt	Lotus GP	16	+37.146	7	
12	28	(United Kingdom) William Buller	Carlin	16	+37.150	23	
13	14	(Philippines) Marlon Stöckinger	Status Grand Prix	16	+38.616	9	
14	19	(Republic of Ireland) Robert Cregan	Ocean Racing Technology	16	+39.674	21	
15	22	(Switzerland) Alex Fontana	Jenzer Motorsport	16	+48.584	17	
16	7	(Russia) Dmitry Suranovich	Marussia Manor Racing	16	+50.483	25	
17	31	(United States) Ethan Ringel	Atech CRS Grand Prix	16	+59.255	22	
18	30	(Argentina) Facu Regalia	Atech CRS Grand Prix	16	+1:04.953	18	
19	23	(Italy) Vicky Piria	Trident Racing	16	+1:12.457	20	
20	16	(United Kingdom) Alice Powell	Status Grand Prix	16	+1:22.641	19	
21	4	(New Zealand) Mitch Evans	MW Arden	16	+1:31.650	6	
22	20	(Romania) Robert Visoiu	Jenzer Motorsport	16	+1 Lap	12	
Ret	17	(Spain) Carmen Jordá	Ocean Racing Technology	13	Retired	24	
Ret	25	(Italy) Giovanni Venturini	Trident Racing	12	Retired	11	
Ret	5	(Italy) David Fumanelli	MW Arden	0	Retired	1	
DNS	8	(Brazil) Fabiano Machado	Marussia Manor Racing	0	did not start	—	
Fastest lap: Mitch Evans (MW Arden) — 1:40.097 (on lap 16)

== Standings after the round ==
Drivers' Championship standings

	Pos	Driver	Points
	1	(New Zealand) Mitch Evans	136
	2	(Finland) Aaro Vainio	119
4	3	(Portugal) António Félix da Costa	102
1	4	(Germany) Daniel Abt	94
1	5	(Switzerland) Patric Niederhauser	87

Teams' Championship standings

	Pos	Team	Points
	1	(France) Lotus GP	294
	2	(Australia) MW Arden	245
1	3	(United Kingdom) Carlin	139
1	4	(Switzerland) Jenzer Motorsport	109
	5	(United Kingdom) Marussia Manor Racing	58

- Note: Only the top five positions are included for both sets of standings.

== See also ==
- 2012 Hungarian Grand Prix
- 2012 Hungaroring GP2 Series round

Previous round: 2012 Hockenheimring GP3 Series round	GP3 Series; 2012 season	Next round: 2012 Spa-Francorchamps GP3 Series round
Previous round: 2011 Hungaroring GP3 Series round	Hungaroring GP3 round	Next round: 2013 Hungaroring GP3 Series round
