= 2012 Hockenheimring GP3 Series round =

(Germany) 2012 Hockenheim GP3 round
Round details
- Round 5 of 8 rounds in the 2012 GP3 Series
- The Hockenheimring since 2002
- Location: Hockenheimring, Hockenheim, Germany
- Course: Permanent racing facility 4.574 km (2.842 mi)

GP3 Series

Race 1
- Date: 21 July 2012
- Laps: 14

Pole position
Driver	(Germany) Daniel Abt	Lotus GP
- Time: 1:31.961

Podium
First	(Switzerland) Patric Niederhauser	Jenzer Motorsport
Second	(United States) Conor Daly	Lotus GP
Third	(Italy) Giovanni Venturini	Trident Racing

Fastest lap
Driver	(Cyprus) Tio Ellinas	Marussia Manor Racing
- Time: 1:51.511 (on lap 14)

Race 2
- Date: 22 July 2012
- Laps: 15

Podium
First	(New Zealand) Mitch Evans	MW Arden
Second	(Germany) Daniel Abt	Lotus GP
Third	(United States) Conor Daly	Lotus GP

Fastest lap
Driver	(New Zealand) Mitch Evans	MW Arden
- Time: 1:33.088 (on lap 10)

The 2012 Hockenheimring GP3 Series round was a GP3 Series motor race held on July 21 and 22, 2012 at Hockenheimring in Hockenheim, Germany. It was the fifth round of the 2012 GP3 Season. The race supported the 2012 German Grand Prix.

== Classification ==
=== Qualifying ===
Pos.	No.	Driver	Team	Time	Grid
1	1	(Germany) Daniel Abt	Lotus GP	1:31.961	1
2	4	(New Zealand) Mitch Evans	MW Arden	1:32.191	2
3	2	(United States) Conor Daly	Lotus GP	1:32.267	3
4	3	(Finland) Aaro Vainio	Lotus GP	1:32.551	4
5	27	(Portugal) António Félix da Costa	Carlin	1:32.564	5
6	5	(Italy) David Fumanelli	MW Arden	1:32.658	6
7	21	(Switzerland) Patric Niederhauser	Jenzer Motorsport	1:32.689	7
8	14	(Philippines) Marlon Stöckinger	Status Grand Prix	1:32.773	8
9	18	(Italy) Kevin Ceccon	Ocean Racing Technology	1:33.010	9
10	25	(Italy) Giovanni Venturini	Trident Racing	1:33.079	10
11	6	(Finland) Matias Laine	MW Arden	1:33.079	11
12	26	(United Kingdom) Alex Brundle	Carlin	1:33.089	12
13	28	(United Kingdom) William Buller	Carlin	1:33.115	13
14	20	(Romania) Robert Visoiu	Jenzer Motorsport	133.133	14
15	15	(United Kingdom) Lewis Williamson	Status Grand Prix	1:33.263	15
16	29	(Hungary) Tamás Pál Kiss	Atech CRS Grand Prix	1:33.347	16
17	16	(United Kingdom) Alice Powell	Status Grand Prix	1:33.583	17
18	31	(United States) Ethan Ringel	Atech CRS Grand Prix	1:34.035	18
19	19	(Republic of Ireland) Robert Cregan	Ocean Racing Technology	1:34.258	19
20	8	(Brazil) Fabiano Machado	Marussia Manor Racing	1:34.270	20
21	23	(Italy) Vicky Piria	Trident Racing	1:34.756	21
22	17	(Spain) Carmen Jordá	Ocean Racing Technology	1:36.073	22
DQ	9	(Cyprus) Tio Ellinas	Marussia Manor Racing	1:32.381	23
DQ	7	(Russia) Dmitry Suranovich	Marussia Manor Racing	1:33.861	24

=== Race 1 ===
Pos.	No.	Driver	Team	Laps	Time/Retired	Grid	Points
1	21	(Switzerland) Patric Niederhauser	Jenzer Motorsport	14	45:51.078	7	25
2	2	(United States) Conor Daly	Lotus GP	14	+0.693	3	18
3	25	(Italy) Giovanni Venturini	Trident Racing	14	+8.841	10	15
4	6	(Finland) Matias Laine	MW Arden	14	+11.353	11	12
5	3	(Finland) Aaro Vainio	Lotus GP	14	+11.983	4	10
6	29	(Hungary) Tamás Pál Kiss	Atech CRS Grand Prix	14	+12.555	16	8
7	1	(Germany) Daniel Abt	Lotus GP	14	+13.415	1	10 (6+4)
8	4	(New Zealand) Mitch Evans	MW Arden	14	+13.983	2	4
9	28	(United Kingdom) William Buller	Carlin	14	+14.205	13	2
10	9	(Cyprus) Tio Ellinas	Marussia Manor Racing	14	+18.564	23	3 (1+2)
11	19	(Republic of Ireland) Robert Cregan	Ocean Racing Technology	14	+22.297	19	
12	5	(Italy) David Fumanelli	MW Arden	14	+22.889	6	
13	15	(United Kingdom) Lewis Williamson	Status Grand Prix	14	+24.264	15	
14	23	(Italy) Vicky Piria	Trident Racing	14	+29.081	21	
15	7	(Russia) Dmitry Suranovich	Marussia Manor Racing	14	+29.696	24	
16	14	(Philippines) Marlon Stöckinger	Status Grand Prix	14	+31.067	8	
17	18	(Italy) Kevin Ceccon	Ocean Racing Technology	14	+1:05.361	9	
18	31	(United States) Ethan Ringel	Atech CRS Grand Prix	14	+1:38.233	18	
19	16	(United Kingdom) Alice Powell	Status Grand Prix	14	+1:42.018	17	
20	17	(Spain) Carmen Jordá	Ocean Racing Technology	14	+1:56.621	22	
Ret	27	(Portugal) António Félix da Costa	Carlin	9	Retired	5	
Ret	8	(Brazil) Fabiano Machado	Marussia Manor Racing	8	Retired	20	
DSQ	20	(Romania) Robert Visoiu	Jenzer Motorsport	14	(+42.621)	14	
DSQ	26	(United Kingdom) Alex Brundle	Carlin	14	(+1:29.303)	12	
Fastest lap: Tio Ellinas (Marussia Manor Racing) — 1:51.511 (on lap 14)

=== Race 2 ===
Pos.	No.	Driver	Team	Laps	Time/Retired	Grid	Points
1	4	(New Zealand) Mitch Evans	MW Arden	15	30:14.349	1	17 (15+2)
2	1	(Germany) Daniel Abt	Lotus GP	15	+0.428	2	12
3	2	(United States) Conor Daly	Lotus GP	15	+0.987	7	10
4	29	(Hungary) Tamás Pál Kiss	Atech CRS Grand Prix	15	+1.342	3	8
5	6	(Finland) Matias Laine	MW Arden	15	+2.737	5	6
6	3	(Finland) Aaro Vainio	Lotus GP	15	+2.917	4	4
7	9	(Cyprus) Tio Ellinas	Marussia Manor Racing	15	+3.086	10	2
8	25	(Italy) Giovanni Venturini	Trident Racing	15	+4.020	6	1
9	21	(Switzerland) Patric Niederhauser	Jenzer Motorsport	15	+5.553	8	
10	5	(Italy) David Fumanelli	MW Arden	15	+6.602	12	
11	14	(Philippines) Marlon Stöckinger	Status Grand Prix	15	+6.784	16	
12	20	(Romania) Robert Visoiu	Jenzer Motorsport	15	+8.972	24	
13	26	(United Kingdom) Alex Brundle	Carlin	15	+9.201	23	
14	7	(Russia) Dmitry Suranovich	Marussia Manor Racing	15	+9.306	15	
15	18	(Italy) Kevin Ceccon	Ocean Racing Technology	15	+11.715	17	
16	31	(United States) Ethan Ringel	Atech CRS Grand Prix	15	+12.218	18	
NC	19	(Republic of Ireland) Robert Cregan	Ocean Racing Technology	10	Not classified	11	
Ret	17	(Spain) Carmen Jordá	Ocean Racing Technology	10	Retired	20	
Ret	8	(Brazil) Fabiano Machado	Marussia Manor Racing	9	Retired	22	
Ret	15	(United Kingdom) Lewis Williamson	Status Grand Prix	0	Retired	13	
Ret	16	(United Kingdom) Alice Powell	Status Grand Prix	0	Retired	19	
Ret	23	(Italy) Vicky Piria	Trident Racing	0	Retired	14	
Ret	27	(Portugal) António Félix da Costa	Carlin	0	Retired	21	
Ret	28	(United Kingdom) William Buller	Carlin	0	Retired	9	
Fastest lap: Mitch Evans (MW Arden) — 1:33.088 (on lap 10)

== Standings after the round ==
Drivers' Championship standings

	Pos	Driver	Points
	1	(New Zealand) Mitch Evans	121
	2	(Finland) Aaro Vainio	103
1	3	(Germany) Daniel Abt	76
1	4	(Switzerland) Patric Niederhauser	75
1	5	(United States) Conor Daly	75

Teams' Championship standings

	Pos	Team	Points
	1	(France) Lotus GP	254
	2	(Australia) MW Arden	216
1	3	(Switzerland) Jenzer Motorsport	97
1	4	(United Kingdom) Carlin	85
	5	(United Kingdom) Marussia Manor Racing	50

- Note: Only the top five positions are included for both sets of standings.

== See also ==
- 2012 German Grand Prix
- 2012 Hockenheimring GP2 Series round

Previous round: 2012 Silverstone GP3 Series round	GP3 Series; 2012 season	Next round: 2012 Hungaroring GP3 Series round
Previous round: 2011 Nürburgring GP2 Series round	Hockenheimring GP3 round	Next round: 2013 Nürburgring GP3 Series round
