= 2012 Monza GP3 Series round =

Motor race competition

(Italy) 2012 Monza GP3 round
Round details
- Round 8 of 8 rounds in the 2012 GP3 Series
- Layout of the Autodromo Nazionale Monza
- Location: Autodromo Nazionale Monza, Monza, Italy
- Course: Permanent racing facility 5.793 km (3.600 mi)

GP3 Series

Race 1
- Date: 8 September 2012
- Laps: 16

Pole position
Driver	(New Zealand) Mitch Evans	MW Arden
- Time: 1:43.542

Podium
First	(Germany) Daniel Abt	Lotus GP
Second	(Cyprus) Tio Ellinas	Marussia Manor Racing
Third	(Finland) Matias Laine	MW Arden

Fastest lap
Driver	(Cyprus) Tio Ellinas	Marussia Manor Racing
- Time: 1:44.545 (on lap 12)

Race 2
- Date: 9 September 2012
- Laps: 16

Podium
First	(Cyprus) Tio Ellinas	Marussia Manor Racing
Second	(Germany) Daniel Abt	Lotus GP
Third	(Italy) Giovanni Venturini	Trident Racing

Fastest lap
Driver	(Romania) Robert Vișoiu	Jenzer Motorsport
- Time: 1:44.872 (on lap 12)

The 2012 Monza GP3 Series round was a GP3 Series motor race held on September 10 and 11, 2012 at Autodromo Nazionale Monza, Italy. It was the eighth and final round of the 2012 GP3 Series. The race supported the 2012 Italian Grand Prix.

MW Arden driver Mitch Evans secured the 2012 GP3 championship in the Race 2 when his nearest title rival, Daniel Abt failed to secure enough points to take the title himself.

This was also the final race for the original GP3 car, the Dallara GP3/10, as it was replaced in 2013 by the GP3/13.

== Classification ==
=== Qualifying ===
Pos.	No.	Driver	Team	Time	Grid
1	4	(New Zealand) Mitch Evans	MW Arden	1:43.542	1
2	27	(Portugal) António Félix da Costa	Carlin	1:43.562	2
3	5	(Italy) David Fumanelli	MW Arden	1:43.897	3
4	6	(Finland) Matias Laine	MW Arden	1:43.903	4
5	9	(Cyprus) Tio Ellinas	Marussia Manor Racing	1:44.105	5
6	29	(Hungary) Tamás Pál Kiss	Atech CRS Grand Prix	1:44.186	16^{1}
7	28	(United Kingdom) William Buller	Carlin	1:44.273	6
8	1	(Germany) Daniel Abt	Lotus GP	1:44.371	7
9	2	(United States) Conor Daly	Lotus GP	1:44.433	8
10	21	(Switzerland) Patric Niederhauser	Jenzer Motorsport	1:44.452	9
11	25	(Italy) Giovanni Venturini	Trident Racing	1:44.516	10
12	20	(Romania) Robert Visoiu	Jenzer Motorsport	1:44.600	11
13	3	(Finland) Aaro Vainio	Lotus GP	1:44.668	12
14	7	(Russia) Dmitry Suranovich	Marussia Manor Racing	1:44.860	13
15	19	(Republic of Ireland) Robert Cregan	Ocean Racing Technology	1:44.903	14
16	14	(Philippines) Marlon Stöckinger	Status Grand Prix	1:44.943	15
17	15	(United Kingdom) Lewis Williamson	Status Grand Prix	1:44.960	17
18	8	(Brazil) Fabiano Machado	Marussia Manor Racing	1:45.030	18
19	26	(United Kingdom) Alex Brundle	Carlin Motorsport	1:45.056	19
20	30	(Belgium) John Wartique	Atech CRS Grand Prix	1:45.165	20
21	18	(Italy) Kevin Ceccon	Ocean Racing Technology	1:45.213	25^{2}
22	16	(United Kingdom) Alice Powell	Status Grand Prix	1:45.303	21
23	23	(Italy) Vicky Piria	Trident Racing	1:45.659	22
24	31	(United States) Ethan Ringel	Atech CRS Grand Prix	1:46.911	23
25	17	(Spain) Carmen Jordá	Ocean Racing Technology	1:49.400	24

notes:

- ^1 — Tamás Pál Kiss was given a ten-place grid penalty for causing an avoidable accident with Fabiano Machado during free practice.
- ^2 — Kevin Ceccon was given a five-place grid penalty after qualifying for causing an avoidable collision.

=== Race 1 ===
Pos.	No.	Driver	Team	Laps	Time/Retired	Grid	Points
1	1	(Germany) Daniel Abt	Lotus GP	16	28:17.548	7	25
2	9	(Cyprus) Tio Ellinas	Marussia Manor Racing	16	+0.349	5	18+2
3	6	(Finland) Matias Laine	MW Arden	16	+1.881	4	15
4	2	(United States) Conor Daly	Lotus GP	16	+14.108	8	12
5	21	(Switzerland) Patric Niederhauser	Jenzer Motorsport	16	+14.602	9	10
6	5	(Italy) David Fumanelli	MW Arden	16	+16.401	3	8
7	14	(Philippines) Marlon Stöckinger	Status Grand Prix	16	+16.750	15	6
8	25	(Italy) Giovanni Venturini	Trident Racing	16	+16.836	10	4
9	29	(Hungary) Tamás Pál Kiss	Atech CRS Grand Prix	16	+17.712	16	2
10	28	(United Kingdom) William Buller	Carlin	16	+18.242	6	1
11	3	(Finland) Aaro Vainio	Lotus GP	16	+20.593	13	
12	16	(United Kingdom) Alice Powell	Status Grand Prix	16	+26.101	21	
13	18	(Italy) Kevin Ceccon	Ocean Racing Technology	16	+28.448	21	
14	20	(Romania) Robert Visoiu	Jenzer Motorsport	16	+28.795	12	
15	27	(Portugal) António Félix da Costa	Carlin	16	+29.375	2	
16	23	(Italy) Vicky Piria	Trident Racing	16	+34.411	22	
17	30	(Belgium) John Wartique	Atech CRS Grand Prix	16	+46.207	20	
18	31	(United States) Ethan Ringel	Atech CRS Grand Prix	16	+51.238	23	
19	15	(United Kingdom) Lewis Williamson	Status Grand Prix	16	+1:00.707	17	
20	19	(Republic of Ireland) Robert Cregan	Ocean Racing Technology	16	+1:01.569	15	
21	17	(Spain) Carmen Jordá	Ocean Racing Technology	16	+1:30.934	24	
22	7	(Russia) Dmitry Suranovich	Marussia Manor Racing	14	Retired	14	
Ret	26	(United Kingdom) Alex Brundle	Carlin	10	Retired	19	
Ret	4	(New Zealand) Mitch Evans	MW Arden	1	Retired	1	4
Ret	8	(Brazil) Fabiano Machado	Marussia Manor Racing	1	Retired	18	
Fastest lap: Tio Ellinas (Marussia Manor Racing) — 1:44.545 (on lap 12)

=== Race 2 ===
Pos.	No.	Driver	Team	Laps	Time/Retired	Grid	Points
1	9	(Cyprus) Tio Ellinas	Marussia Manor Racing	16	28:18.541	7	15
2	1	(Germany) Daniel Abt	Lotus GP	16	+1.003	8	12
3	25	(Italy) Giovanni Venturini	Trident Racing	16	+1.408	1	10
4	14	(Philippines) Marlon Stöckinger	Status Grand Prix	16	+1.715	2	8
5	27	(Portugal) António Félix da Costa	Carlin	16	+7.377	15	6
6	6	(Finland) Matias Laine	MW Arden	16	+8.488	6	4
7	20	(Romania) Robert Visoiu	Jenzer Motorsport	16	+8.968	14	2+2
8	16	(United Kingdom) Alice Powell	Status Grand Prix	15	+14.383	12	1
9	18	(Italy) Kevin Ceccon	Ocean Racing Technology	16	+14.416	13	
10	26	(United Kingdom) Alex Brundle	Carlin	16	+15.535	23	
11	2	(United States) Conor Daly	Lotus GP	16	+16.124	5	
12	28	(United Kingdom) William Buller	Carlin	16	+18.964	10	
13	5	(Italy) David Fumanelli	MW Arden	16	+24.392	3	
14	3	(Finland) Aaro Vainio	Lotus GP	16	+27.489	11	
15	29	(Hungary) Tamás Pál Kiss	Atech CRS Grand Prix	16	+30.682	9	
16	8	(Brazil) Fabiano Machado	Marussia Manor Racing	16	+36.048	25	
17	19	(Republic of Ireland) Robert Cregan	Ocean Racing Technology	16	+36.116	20	
18	30	(Belgium) John Wartique	Atech CRS Grand Prix	16	+38.365	17	
19	17	(Spain) Carmen Jordá	Ocean Racing Technology	16	+1:08.753	21	
20	4	(New Zealand) Mitch Evans	MW Arden	16	+1:29.894	24	
Ret	21	(Switzerland) Patric Niederhauser	Jenzer Motorsport	7	Retired	4	
Ret	23	(Italy) Vicky Piria	Trident Racing	2	Retired	16	
Ret	15	(United Kingdom) Lewis Williamson	Status Grand Prix	0	Retired	19	
Ret	31	(United States) Ethan Ringel	Atech CRS Grand Prix	0	Retired	18	
Ret	7	(Russia) Dmitry Suranovich	Marussia Manor Racing	0	Retired	22	
Fastest lap: Robert Visoiu (Jenzer Motorsport) — 1:44.872 (on lap 12)

== Standings after the round ==
Drivers' Championship standings

	Pos.	Driver	Points
	1	(New Zealand) Mitch Evans	151.5
2	2	(Germany) Daniel Abt	149.5
1	3	(Portugal) António Félix da Costa	132
1	4	(Finland) Aaro Vainio	123
2	5	(Finland) Matias Laine	111

Teams' Championship standings

Pos.	Team	Points
1	(France) Lotus GP	378.5
2	(Australia) MW Arden	309.5
3	(United Kingdom) Carlin	171
4	(Switzerland) Jenzer Motorsport	133.5
5	(United Kingdom) Marussia Manor Racing	97

- Note: Only the top five positions are included for both sets of standings.

== See also ==
- 2012 Italian Grand Prix
- 2012 Monza GP2 Series round

Previous round: 2012 Spa-Francorchamps GP3 Series round	GP3 Series; 2012 season	Next round: 2013 Catalunya GP3 Series round
Previous round: 2011 Monza GP3 Series round	Monza GP3 round	Next round: 2013 Monza GP3 Series round
