= 2011 Monza GP3 Series round =

Motor race competition

(Italy) 2011 Monza GP3 round
Round details
- Round 8 of 8 rounds in the 2011 GP3 Series
- Location: Autodromo Nazionale Monza, Monza, Italy
- Course: Permanent racing facility 5.793 km (3.6 mi)

GP3 Series

Race 1
- Date: 10 September 2011
- Laps: 16

Pole position
Driver	(United Kingdom) Adrian Quaife-Hobbs	Marussia Manor Racing
- Time: 1:43.788

Podium
First	(Finland) Valtteri Bottas	Lotus ART
Second	(United Kingdom) James Calado	Lotus ART
Third	(Indonesia) Rio Haryanto	Marussia Manor Racing

Fastest lap
Driver	(Indonesia) Rio Haryanto	Marussia Manor Racing
- Time: 1:45.194

Race 2
- Date: 11 September 2011
- Laps: 16

Podium
First	(Portugal) António Félix da Costa	Status Grand Prix
Second	(Indonesia) Rio Haryanto	Marussia Manor Racing
Third	(Switzerland) Nico Müller	Jenzer Motorsport

Fastest lap
Driver	(Finland) Valtteri Bottas	Lotus ART
- Time: 1:44.801

The 2011 Monza GP3 Series round was a GP3 Series motor race held on September 10 and 11, 2011 at Autodromo Nazionale Monza, Italy. It was the final round of the 2011 GP3 Series. The race supported the 2011 Italian Grand Prix.

Lotus ART was crowned Teams' Champion in Belgium, while in the Drivers' standings Valtteri Bottas, who held a five-point lead over his teammate James Calado before the round, with Nigel Melker, Alexander Sims and Adrian Quaife-Hobbs all having mathematically a chance, sealed the title with his victory in Race 1.

== Classification ==
=== Race 1 ===
Pos	No.	Driver	Team	Laps	Time/Retired	Grid	Points
1	2	(Finland) Valtteri Bottas	Lotus ART	16	30:03.132	5	10
2	3	(United Kingdom) James Calado	Lotus ART	16	+0.378	6	8
3	11	(Indonesia) Rio Haryanto	Marussia Manor Racing	16	+1.513	3	6+1
4	7	(Switzerland) Nico Müller	Jenzer Motorsport	16	+2.121	2	5
5	27	(Switzerland) Simon Trummer	MW Arden	16	+4.297	7	4
6	14	(United States) Conor Daly	Carlin	16	+4.375	17	3
7	5	(Portugal) António Félix da Costa	Status Grand Prix	16	+4.816	14	2
8	26	(New Zealand) Mitch Evans	MW Arden	16	+5.937	4	1
9	31	(Netherlands) Nigel Melker	RSC Mücke Motorsport	16	+5.986	13	
10	1	(New Zealand) Richie Stanaway	Lotus ART	16	+8.572	22	
11	15	(United Kingdom) Callum MacLeod	Carlin	16	+12.445	23	
12	30	(Denmark) Michael Christensen	RSC Mücke Motorsport	16	+12.889	8	
13	16	(Brazil) Leonardo Cordeiro	Carlin	16	+13.238	27	
14	18	(Netherlands) Thomas Hylkema	Tech 1 Racing	16	+17.131	25	
15	29	(Italy) Daniel Mancinelli	RSC Mücke Motorsport	16	+17.317	28^{3}	
16	9	(Switzerland) Christophe Hurni	Jenzer Motorsport	16	+24.474	30	
17	24	(Colombia) Gabriel Chaves	Addax Team	16	+25.225	15	
18	28	(United Kingdom) Lewis Williamson	MW Arden	16	+25.941	29^{2}	
19	20	(Philippines) Marlon Stöckinger	ATECH CRS GP	16	+38.993	24	
20	12	(Finland) Matias Laine	Marussia Manor Racing	16	+40.122	19	
21	4	(United Kingdom) Alexander Sims	Status Grand Prix	15	Retired	11	
22	17	(Finland) Aaro Vainio	Tech 1 Racing	14	Retired	16	
Ret	23	(France) Tom Dillmann	Addax Team	13	Retired	10	
Ret	10	(United Kingdom) Adrian Quaife-Hobbs	Marussia Manor Racing	10	Retired	1	2
Ret	21	(United Kingdom) Nick Yelloly	ATECH CRS GP	9	Retired	26	
Ret	19	(Hungary) Tamás Pál Kiss	Tech 1 Racing	8	Retired	9	
Ret	6	(Russia) Ivan Lukashevich	Status Grand Prix	2	Retired	12	
Ret	22	(Switzerland) Zoël Amberg	ATECH CRS GP	0	Retired	18	
Ret	25	(Italy) Vittorio Ghirelli	Addax Team	0	Retired	20	
Ret	8	(Russia) Maxim Zimin	Jenzer Motorsport	0	Retired	21	
Fastest lap: Rio Haryanto (Marussia Manor Racing) 1:45.194

Notes

- ^2 – Williamson was given a 10 place grid penalty for causing a collision during the practice session.
- ^3 – Mancinelli received a 3 place grid penalty for impeding Quaife-Hobbs during the practice session.

=== Race 2 ===
Pos	No.	Driver	Team	Laps	Time/Retired	Grid	Points
1	5	(Portugal) António Félix da Costa	Status Grand Prix	16	28:28.320	2	6
2	11	(Indonesia) Rio Haryanto	Marussia Manor Racing	16	+0.720	6	5
3	7	(Switzerland) Nico Müller	Jenzer Motorsport	16	+1.208	5	4
4	27	(Switzerland) Simon Trummer	MW Arden	16	+1.935	4	3
5	15	(United Kingdom) Callum MacLeod	Carlin	16	+2.308	10	2+1
6	10	(United Kingdom) Adrian Quaife-Hobbs	Marussia Manor Racing	16	+6.235	24	1
7	24	(Colombia) Gabriel Chaves	Addax Team	16	+7.027	16	
8	17	(Finland) Aaro Vainio	Tech 1 Racing	16	+7.599	22	
9	23	(France) Tom Dillmann	Addax Team	16	+9.949	23	
10	28	(United Kingdom) Lewis Williamson	MW Arden	16	+10.128	17	
11	30	(Denmark) Michael Christensen	RSC Mücke Motorsport	16	+10.699	11	
12	19	(Hungary) Tamás Pál Kiss	Tech 1 Racing	16	+11.320	26	
13	20	(Philippines) Marlon Stöckinger	ATECH CRS GP	16	+11.426	18	
14	3	(United Kingdom) James Calado	Lotus ART	16	+20.397^{5}	7	
15	29	(Italy) Daniel Mancinelli	RSC Mücke Motorsport	16	+23.506	14	
16	8	(Russia) Maxim Zimin	Jenzer Motorsport	16	+39.759	29	
17	2	(Finland) Valtteri Bottas	Lotus ART	16	+42.707	8	
18	25	(Italy) Vittorio Ghirelli	Addax Team	16	+1:04.588	30^{4}	
19	1	(New Zealand) Richie Stanaway	Lotus ART	16	+1:05.428	20^{4}	
20	9	(Switzerland) Christophe Hurni	Jenzer Motorsport	16	+1:34.972	15	
Ret	26	(New Zealand) Mitch Evans	MW Arden	13	Retired	1	
Ret	31	(Netherlands) Nigel Melker	RSC Mücke Motorsport	9	Retired	9	
Ret	21	(United Kingdom) Nick Yelloly	ATECH CRS GP	9	Retired	25	
Ret	16	(Brazil) Leonardo Cordeiro	Carlin	6	Retired	12	
Ret	12	(Finland) Matias Laine	Marussia Manor Racing	5	Retired	19	
Ret	22	(Switzerland) Zoël Amberg	ATECH CRS GP	3	Retired	28	
Ret	6	(Russia) Ivan Lukashevich	Status Grand Prix	3	Retired	27	
Ret	4	(United Kingdom) Alexander Sims	Status Grand Prix	1	Retired	21	
Ret	18	(Netherlands) Thomas Hylkema	Tech 1 Racing	1	Retired	13	
Ret	14	(United States) Conor Daly	Carlin	0	Retired	3	
Fastest lap: Valtteri Bottas (Lotus ART) 1:44.801

Notes

- ^4 – Stanaway and Ghirelli were given a 10 place grid penalty for causing separate collisions during Race 1.
- ^5 – Calado received a drive through penalty in the last laps of the race for causing a collision, so the penalty became a 20-second addition to his race time.

== Final standings ==
Drivers' Championship standings

Pos	Driver	Points
1	(Finland) Valtteri Bottas	62
2	(United Kingdom) James Calado	55
3	(Netherlands) Nigel Melker	38
4	(Switzerland) Nico Müller	36
5	(United Kingdom) Adrian Quaife-Hobbs	36

Teams' Championship standings

Pos	Team	Points
1	(France) Lotus ART	124
2	(Australia) MW Arden	69
3	(United Kingdom) Marussia Manor Racing	67
4	(Germany) RSC Mücke Motorsport	61
5	(Republic of Ireland) Status Grand Prix	50

- Note: Only the top five positions are included for both sets of standings.

== See also ==
- 2011 Italian Grand Prix
- 2011 Monza GP2 Series round

Previous round: 2011 Spa-Francorchamps GP3 Series round	GP3 Series; 2011 season	Next round: 2012 Catalunya GP3 Series round
Previous round: 2010 Monza GP3 Series round	Italian GP3 round	Next round: 2012 Monza GP3 Series round
