= Matias Laine =

Finnish racing driver (born 1990)

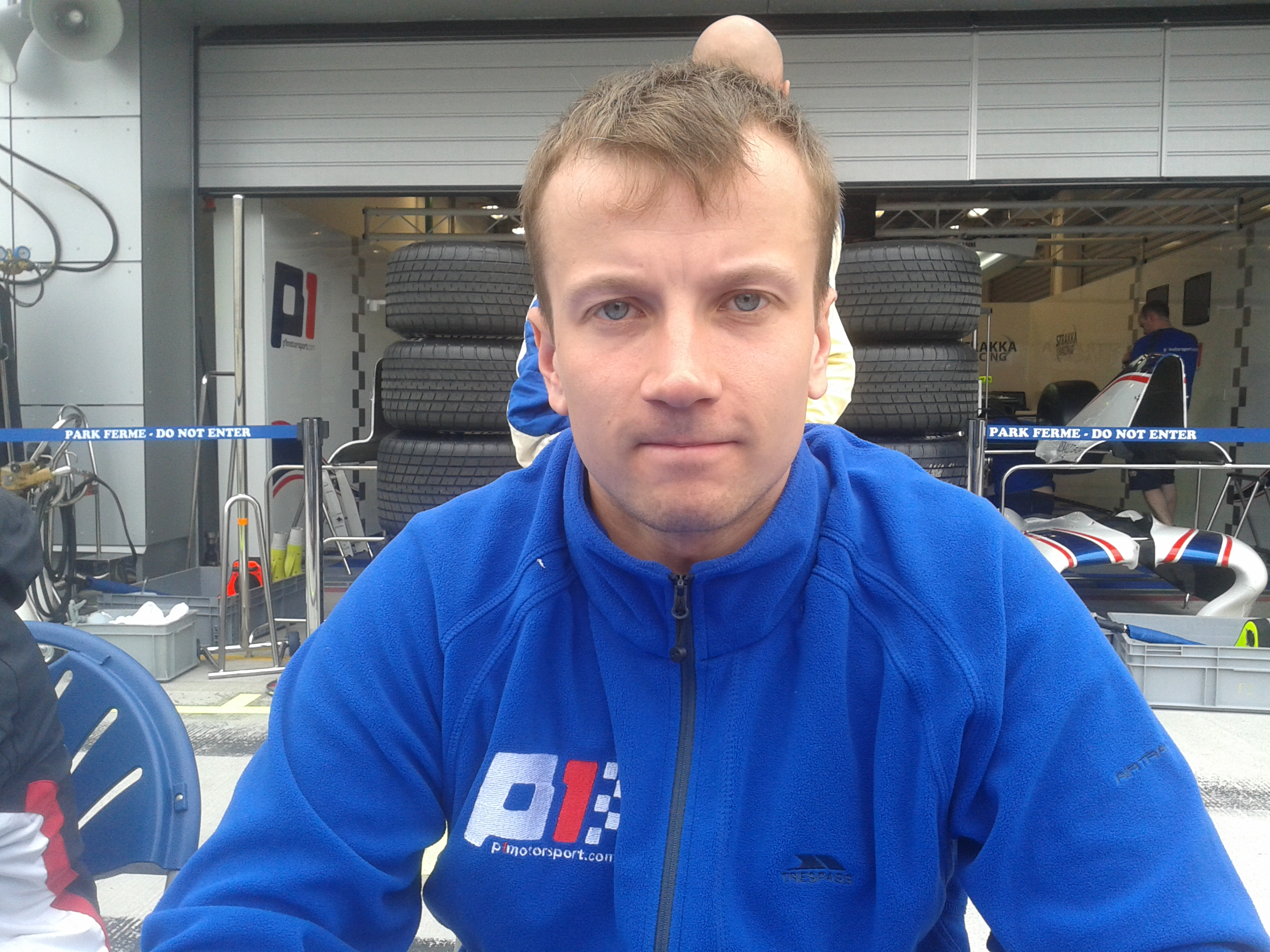
- Laine in 2013.
- Nationality: (Finland) Finnish
- Born: Matias Roni Rikunpoika Laine; 25 April 1990 (age 36) Joensuu (Finland)

Formula Renault 3.5 Series career
- Debut season: 2013
- Current team: Strakka Racing
- Car number: 12
- Former teams: P1 by Strakka Racing
- Starts: 34
- Wins: 0
- Poles: 0
- Fastest laps: 0
- Best finish: 13th in 2014

Previous series
- 2011 2010 2009 2009 2008 2008: GP3 Series; Formula 3 Euro Series; Formula Renault 2.0 UK; Eurocup Formula Renault 2.0; FR2.0 UK Winter Series; FR2.0 Portugal Winter Series

Matias Roni Rikunpoika Laine (born 25 April 1990 in Joensuu) is a Finnish former racing driver.

== Career ==
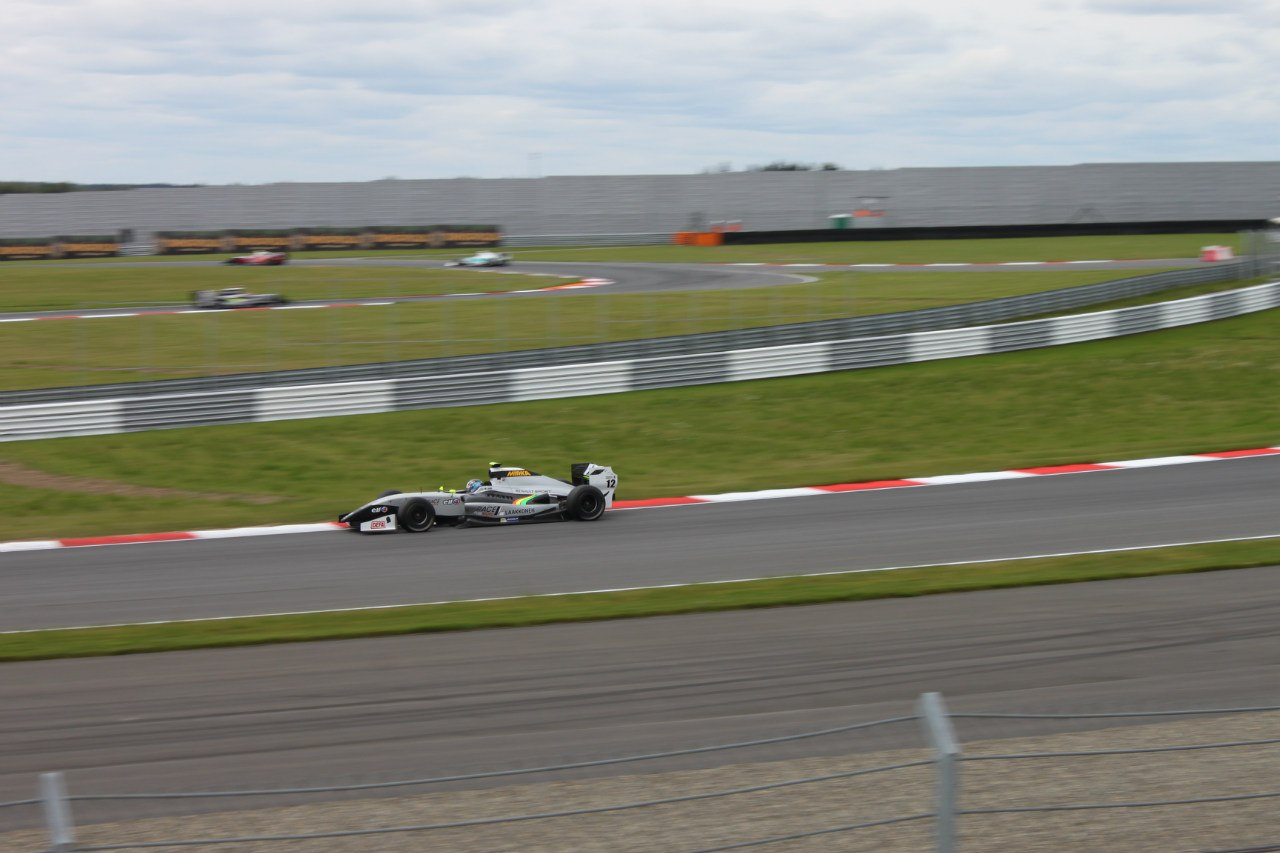
Laine during Race 1 of the 2014 Formula Renault 3.5 Series season at Moscow Raceway.

=== Karting ===
Laine began his motorsport career in karting in 2003, finishing as runner-up in the Finnish Raket Cup Championship. In 2005 he won the Finnish Championship for the ICA Junior class.

=== Formula Renault ===
Laine began his formula racing career in the 2008 Formula Renault 2.0 UK Winter Cup season with CR Scuderia. He finished ninth in the championship with 50 points. He also completed two races of 2008 Portugal Winter Series FR2.0 at Estoril. Laine finished third and thirteenth in those races.

The following season, Laine competed in both the Formula Renault 2.0 UK and Eurocup Formula Renault 2.0 championships for CRS Racing and Motopark Academy respectively. He finished fourteenth in the UK standings, scoring points in each of the twelve races, before injury curtailed his season at Snetterton. In the Eurocup, he took 22nd place in the championship with six points that were earned in the second race at Silverstone Circuit.

=== Formula Three ===
2010 would see Laine move to the Formula 3 Euro Series, competing for Motopark Academy. He joined fellow Formula Renault graduates António Félix da Costa and Adrian Quaife-Hobbs at the team. He earned his first point finishing ninth at Hockenheim round because Esteban Gutiérrez who finished sixth was guest driver and was ineligible to scoring points.

=== GP3 ===
Laine contested for the Marussia Manor Racing team in 2011 and eventually finished 31st. He was signed to MW Arden for the 2012 season where he scored his first points and then his first podium finish in the Catalunya round. He won his first GP3 race at Spa Francorchamps, along with a final podium at Monza. He ended the season fifth and earned a drive for the 2013 Formula Renault 3.5 season with P1 Motorsport.

== Racing record ==
=== Career summary ===
Season	Series	Team	Races	Wins	Poles	F.L.	Podiums	Points	Position
2008	Formula Renault 2.0 UK Winter Cup	CR Scuderia Formula Renault	4	0	0	0	0	50	9th
2008	Portugal Winter Series FR2.0	CR Scuderia Formula Renault	2	0	0	0	1	11	12th
2009	Formula Renault UK 2.0	CRS Racing	12	0	0	0	0	135	14th
2009	Eurocup Formula Renault 2.0	Motopark Academy	4	0	0	0	0	6	22nd
2010	Formula Three Euroseries	Motopark Academy	18	0	0	0	0	3	14th
2011	GP3 Series	Marussia Manor Racing	16	0	0	0	0	0	31st
2012	GP3 Series	MW Arden	16	1	0	1	4	111	5th
2013	Formula Renault 3.5 Series	P1 by Strakka Racing	17	0	0	0	0	9	23rd
2014	Formula Renault 3.5 Series	Strakka Racing	17	0	0	0	0	40	13th

=== Complete Eurocup Formula Renault 2.0 results ===
(key) (Races in bold indicate pole position; races in italics indicate fastest lap)

Year	Entrant	1	2	3	4	5	6	7	8	9	10	11	12	13	14	DC	Points
2009	Motopark Academy	CAT; 1	CAT; 2	SPA; 1	SPA; 2	HUN; 1	HUN; 2	SIL; 1 Ret	SIL; 2; 5	LMS; 1; 26	LMS; 2; 20	NÜR; 1	NÜR; 2	ALC; 1	ALC; 2	22nd	6

=== Complete Formula 3 Euro Series results ===
(key)

Year	Entrant	Chassis	Engine	1	2	3	4	5	6	7	8	9	10	11	12	13	14	15	16	17	18	DC	Points
2010	Motopark Academy	Dallara F308/096	Volkswagen	LEC; 1; 10	LEC; 2; 13	HOC; 1; 9	HOC; 2; 10	VAL; 1 Ret	VAL; 2; 10	NOR; 1; 8	NOR; 2; 7	NÜR; 1; 11	NÜR; 2 Ret	ZAN; 1; 12	ZAN; 2; 10	BRH; 1; 10	BRH; 2; 6	OSC; 1; 11	OSC; 2 Ret	HOC; 1; 10	HOC; 2; 9	14th	3

=== Complete GP3 Series results ===
(key) (Races in bold indicate pole position) (Races in italics indicate fastest lap)

Year	Entrant	1	2	3	4	5	6	7	8	9	10	11	12	13	14	15	16	D.C.	Points
2011	Marussia Manor Racing	IST; FEA; 18	IST; SPR; Ret	CAT; FEA; 19	CAT; SPR; 24	VAL; FEA; 17	VAL; SPR; Ret	SIL; FEA; Ret	SIL; SPR; Ret	NÜR; FEA; 14	NÜR; SPR; 23	HUN; FEA; 14	HUN; SPR; 21	SPA; FEA; 18	SPA; SPR; Ret	MNZ; FEA; 20	MNZ; SPR; Ret	31st	0
2012	MW Arden	CAT; FEA; 5	CAT; SPR; 3	MON; FEA; 21	MON; SPR; 16	VAL; FEA; 5	VAL; SPR; 3	SIL; FEA; 9	SIL; SPR; 18	HOC; FEA; 4	HOC; SPR; 5	HUN; FEA; 7	HUN; SPR; 6	SPA; FEA; 5	SPA; SPR; 1	MNZ; FEA; 3	MNZ; SPR; 6	5th	111

=== Complete Formula Renault 3.5 Series results ===
(key) (Races in bold indicate pole position) (Races in italics indicate fastest lap)

Year	Team	1	2	3	4	5	6	7	8	9	10	11	12	13	14	15	16	17	Pos	Points
2013	P1 Motorsport	MNZ; 1; 9	MNZ; 2 Ret	ALC; 1; 16	ALC; 2; 14	MON; 1; 19	SPA; 1; 17	SPA; 2; 11	MSC; 1; 14	MSC; 2; 21	RBR; 1 Ret	RBR; 2; 15	HUN; 1; 10	HUN; 2; 15	LEC; 1 Ret	LEC; 2; 16	CAT; 1; 7	CAT; 2; 16	23rd	9
2014	Strakka Racing	MNZ; 1; 10	MNZ; 2; 12	ALC; 1; 19	ALC; 2; 14	MON; 1; 13	SPA; 1; 4	SPA; 2; 7	MSC; 1; 8	MSC; 2; 7	NÜR; 1; 6	NÜR; 2 Ret	HUN; 1 Ret	HUN; 2; 13	LEC; 1; 9	LEC; 2; 17	JER; 1; 10	JER; 2 Ret	13th	40
