= 2012 GP3 Series =

Season of motor racing competitions

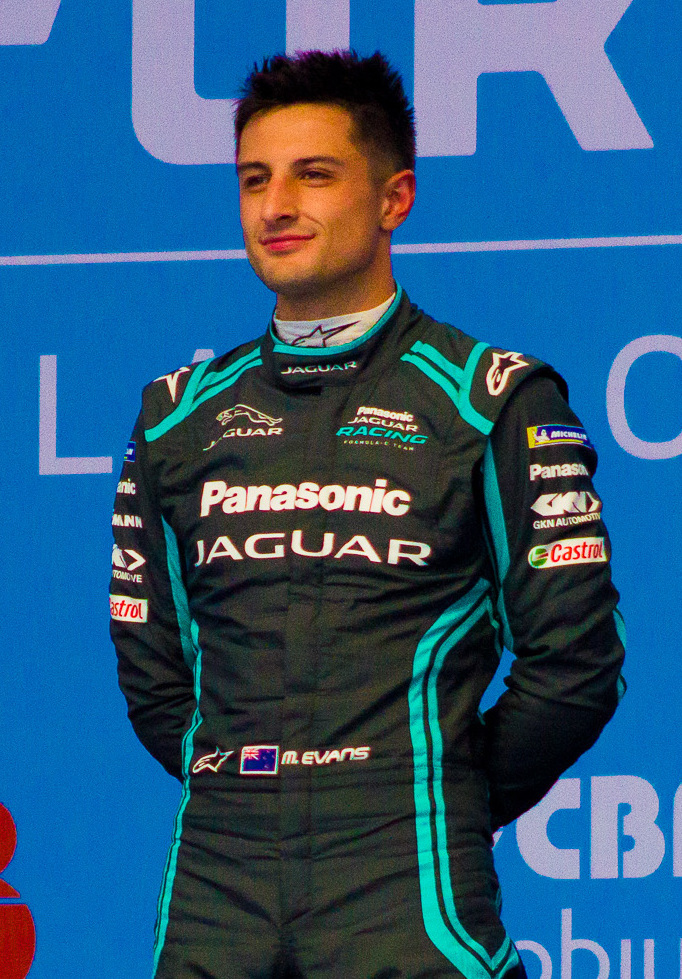
Mitch Evans (pictured in 2020), won the championship

The 2012 GP3 Series season was the third season of the GP3 Series, a feeder series for the GP2 Series. The season began at Barcelona on 12 May and concluded at Autodromo Nazionale Monza on 9 September after eight rounds made up of two races each and all in support of European Formula One Grands Prix.

The series adopted the points system used by Formula One for the feature race, with points awarded to the top ten drivers and twenty-five points on offer for victory. The points awarded in the sprint race also were changed, with the winner receiving fifteen points and top eight drivers receiving points. The points awarded for pole position and the fastest lap of the race also were doubled.

The winner of the championship was Mitch Evans driving for the MW Arden team, who outscored Lotus GP driver Daniel Abt by two points.

2012 was also the final season that the Dallara GP3/10 chassis package, which débuted in the inaugural season of the series in 2010, was used in competition, as a new chassis package and car, the Dallara GP3/13, was introduced for 2013.

== Teams and drivers ==
Ten teams and thirty drivers had been due to take part in the 2012 season. However, in April 2012 it was reported that only twenty-seven drivers would take place with Mücke Motorsport missing from the grid.

Team	No.	Driver name	Rounds
(France) Lotus GP	1	(Germany) Daniel Abt	All
(France) Lotus GP	2	(United States) Conor Daly	All
(France) Lotus GP	3	(Finland) Aaro Vainio	All
(Australia) MW Arden (Note: Arden International competed under a Australia license.)	4	(New Zealand) Mitch Evans	All
(Australia) MW Arden	5	(Italy) David Fumanelli	All
(Australia) MW Arden	6	(Finland) Matias Laine	All
(United Kingdom) Marussia Manor Racing	7	(Russia) Dmitry Suranovich	All
(United Kingdom) Marussia Manor Racing	8	(Brazil) Fabiano Machado	All
(United Kingdom) Marussia Manor Racing	9	(Cyprus) Tio Ellinas	All
(Republic of Ireland) Status Grand Prix (Note: Status Grand Prix competed under a Ireland license.)	14	(Philippines) Marlon Stöckinger	All
(Republic of Ireland) Status Grand Prix	15	(Philippines) Kotaro Sakurai (Note: Kotaro Sakurai ran under a Japanese licence for the first two meetings of the season before changing to a Filipino one for Silverstone.)	1–2, 4
(Republic of Ireland) Status Grand Prix	15	(United Kingdom) Lewis Williamson	5–8
(Republic of Ireland) Status Grand Prix	16	(United Kingdom) Alice Powell	All
(Portugal) Ocean Racing Technology	17	(Spain) Carmen Jordá	All
(Portugal) Ocean Racing Technology	18	(Italy) Kevin Ceccon	All
(Portugal) Ocean Racing Technology	19	(Republic of Ireland) Robert Cregan	All
(Switzerland) Jenzer Motorsport	20	(Romania) Robert Visoiu	All
(Switzerland) Jenzer Motorsport	21	(Switzerland) Patric Niederhauser	All
(Switzerland) Jenzer Motorsport	22	(Czech Republic) Jakub Klášterka	1–2
(Switzerland) Jenzer Motorsport	22	(Argentina) Facu Regalia	4
(Switzerland) Jenzer Motorsport	22	(Switzerland) Alex Fontana	6–7
(Italy) Trident Racing	23	(Italy) Vicky Piria	All
(Italy) Trident Racing	24	(Italy) Antonio Spavone	1–4
(Italy) Trident Racing	25	(Italy) Giovanni Venturini	4–8
(United Kingdom) Carlin	26	(United Kingdom) Alex Brundle	All
(United Kingdom) Carlin	27	(Portugal) António Félix da Costa	All
(United Kingdom) Carlin	28	(United Kingdom) William Buller	All
(United Kingdom) Atech CRS GP	29	(Hungary) Tamás Pál Kiss	All
(United Kingdom) Atech CRS GP	30	(Belgium) John Wartique	1–3, 7–8
(United Kingdom) Atech CRS GP	30	(Brazil) Fabio Gamberini	4
(United Kingdom) Atech CRS GP	30	(Argentina) Facu Regalia	6
(United Kingdom) Atech CRS GP	31	(United States) Ethan Ringel	All

=== Driver changes ===
Changed teams

- Conor Daly, who contested the 2011 season with Carlin, signed with Lotus GP.
- After a season with Status Grand Prix, António Félix da Costa moved to Carlin, a team he competed with at two rounds of the series in 2010.
- Matias Laine switched from Marussia Manor Racing to MW Arden.
- Tamás Pál Kiss, who raced for Tech 1 Racing, joined Atech CRS GP.
- Marlon Stöckinger left Atech CRS GP to join Status Grand Prix.
- Aaro Vainio moved from Tech 1 Racing to Lotus GP.

Entering/Re-Entering GP3 Series

- Daniel Abt joined the series, driving for Lotus GP, after a season in the Formula 3 Euro Series.
- Alex Brundle competes in the series for Carlin, moving from the FIA Formula Two Championship. He was joined by British Formula 3 driver William Buller.
- Auto GP champion Kevin Ceccon and Irish Fujitsu V8 Supercar Series driver Robert Cregan signed with Ocean Racing Technology for his series debut.
- Cypriot-born British Formula Renault driver Tio Ellinas joined Marussia Manor Racing.
- European F3 Open runner-up David Fumanelli made his series debut, driving for MW Arden.
- After missing the 2011 racing season, Carmen Jordá drives for the Ocean Racing Technology team.
- Jakub Klášterka returned to motorsport after two-year absence, joining Jenzer Motorsport.
- Formula Three Sudamericana champion Fabiano Machado entered the series with Marussia Manor Racing.
- Italian Formula Abarth champion Patric Niederhauser and fellow Formula Abarth driver Robert Visoiu moved into the GP3 Series, continuing their association with Jenzer Motorsport. Both combine GP3 with an Italian Formula Three program with BVM and Ghinzani Arco Motorsport respectively.
- Formula Abarth graduate Vicky Piria became the series' first female driver, after signing for Trident Racing. She was joined in the team by fellow Formula Abarth driver Antonio Spavone, who also competing in Auto GP World Series in 2012.
- British Formula Renault driver Alice Powell signed with Status Grand Prix, and was joined in the team by British Formula 3 Rookie champion Kotaro Sakurai.
- F2000 Series and Formula Enterprise driver Ethan Ringel joined Atech CRS GP.
- After driving for four rounds in Formula Abarth with Euronova Racing, Dmitry Suranovich joined Marussia Manor Racing for his GP3 Series debut.
- Belgian sports car racer John Wartique made his debut in GP3 and single seaters with Atech CRS GP team.

Mid-season changes

- Jakub Klášterka left Jenzer Motorsport between the Monaco and Valencia rounds of the championship. He was replaced by Auto GP World Series driver Facu Regalia for the next round at Silverstone.
  - After missing the Hockenheim races, Regalia moved to Atech CRS GP for the Hungarian round. Alex Fontana took his place at Jenzer.
- Kotaro Sakurai left Status Grand Prix due to sponsorship problems. His place was filled by Lewis Williamson, who previously raced in GP3 with MW Arden.
- Giovanni Venturini joined the series for the rest of the season from Silverstone onwards, driving a third car for Trident Racing.
- John Wartique was replaced by Fabio Gamberini at Atech CRS GP for the Silverstone round after Wartique's sponsors failed to meet their financial obligations with the team.

=== Team changes ===
- The series has proposed amending the rules which mean teams are obligated to run three cars. Under the proposed rule changes, teams will only need to enter two cars, and will have the option of entering a third.
- Addax Team will exit the championship to concentrate on their GP2 Series team, and will be replaced by Trident Racing. Trident started the season with only two cars instead of three, before entering a third from Silverstone onwards.
- After competing as Lotus ART in 2011, ART Grand Prix was renamed as Lotus Grand Prix in both the GP2 and GP3 Series championships, reflecting their increased relationship with title sponsor Lotus Cars. The cars will carry a black and gold livery modelled on the livery used by parent team Lotus F1.
- Ocean Racing Technology replaced Tech 1 Racing.
- RSC Mücke, the Ralf Schumacher-Mücke Motorsport collaboration, indicated to series organisers that they would not be taking part in the 2012 season, reducing the number of cars on the grid from thirty to twenty-seven.

== 2012 Schedule ==
The 2012 calendar was announced on 16 December 2011. The series consisted of eight rounds, with a round in Monaco confirmed on 26 January 2012. The series had previously attempted to include a race in Monaco for the 2011 season, but was forced to abandon its plans when it was found that the support paddock did not have enough space for the GP3 Series. The series supported every Grand Prix on the European leg of the 2012 Formula One season.

Round		Location	Circuit	Date	Supporting
1	R1	Catalunya, Spain	Circuit de Catalunya	12 May	Spanish Grand Prix
1	R2	Catalunya, Spain	Circuit de Catalunya	13 May	Spanish Grand Prix
2	R1	Monte Carlo, Monaco	Circuit de Monaco	25 May	Monaco Grand Prix
2	R2	Monte Carlo, Monaco	Circuit de Monaco	26 May	Monaco Grand Prix
3	R1	Valencia. Spain	Valencia Street Circuit	23 June	European Grand Prix
3	R2	Valencia. Spain	Valencia Street Circuit	24 June	European Grand Prix
4	R1	(United Kingdom) Silverstone, UK	Silverstone Circuit	7 July	British Grand Prix
4	R2	(United Kingdom) Silverstone, UK	Silverstone Circuit	8 July	British Grand Prix
5	R1	Hockenheim, Germany	Hockenheimring	21 July	German Grand Prix
5	R2	Hockenheim, Germany	Hockenheimring	22 July	German Grand Prix
6	R1	Budapest, Hungary	Hungaroring	28 July	Hungarian Grand Prix
6	R2	Budapest, Hungary	Hungaroring	29 July	Hungarian Grand Prix
7	R1	Spa, Belgium	Circuit de Spa-Francorchamps	1 September	Belgian Grand Prix
7	R2	Spa, Belgium	Circuit de Spa-Francorchamps	2 September	Belgian Grand Prix
8	R1	Monza, Italy	Autodromo Nazionale Monza	8 September	Italian Grand Prix
8	R2	Monza, Italy	Autodromo Nazionale Monza	9 September	Italian Grand Prix

== Race summaries ==
Carlin's António Félix da Costa qualified on pole position by 0.01 seconds to Lotus GP drivers Conor Daly and Aaro Vainio. However, on the start of the race their team-mate Daniel Abt made a fast getaway from seventh on the grid to lead. But Abt and Félix da Costa both had a jump start and got drive-through penalties. Returnee Mitch Evans, who was behind the two drivers after the start, won the opening race at Barcelona. Status Grand Prix's Marlon Stöckinger scored his first series podium, finishing second. Vainio completed the podium. Conor Daly recouped in the sprint race, claiming his first series win. Reverse polesitter Robert Visoiu and MW Arden's Matias Laine were also on podium.

Two weeks later at Monaco Vainio took the championship lead from Evans after his first series win from pole position in the feature race. He was joined on the podium by Atech CRS GP's Tamás Pál Kiss and Ocean Racing Technology's Kevin Ceccon. Stöckinger, who started from reverse pole, celebrated his first series win. Félix da Costa and Abt completed the podium. The race was noted by two huge accidents between Carlin team-mates Alex Brundle and William Buller, and between Marussia Manor Racing's Dmitry Suranovich and Daly.

The next series stop was at Valencia Street Circuit, where Mitch Evans regained championship lead with win from pole. Aaro Vainio was second, while David Fumanelli scored his first series podium. Like at Monaco the win in the sprint race was claimed by reverse polesitter. This time it was Jenzer Motorsport's Patric Niederhauser, who won the race in GP3 for the first time. Abt and Laine completed the podium.

Prior Silverstone round António Félix da Costa became part of the Red Bull Junior Team and his results increased. He scored his first win of the season, despite start behind championship leaders Evans and Vainio, who joined Félix da Costa on podium. Tyre strategy enabled William Buller to claim the victory in the second race starting from last row on the grid. Daly and Niederhauser completed the podium.

Daniel Abt scored his first pole position on the home soil at Hockenheim. But wet race conditions helped Patric Niederhauser score his second win. Conor Daly and Trident Racing's Giovanni Venturini joined him on podium. Evans extended championship lead by winning the sprint race. He was joined by Lotus GP's Abt and Daly. The race was noted by airborne accidents which left Vicky Piria and Fabiano Machado with injuries.

António Félix da Costa was unstoppable at Budapest, becoming the first GP3 Series driver, who had double win during the weekend. Habitual residents of the podium Abt, Evans and Niederhauser rose again on the podium stages, with Alex Brundle, who joined them for the first time.

== Results ==
Round		Circuit	Pole position	Fastest lap	Winning driver	Winning team	Report
1	R1	(Spain) Circuit de Catalunya	(Portugal) António Félix da Costa	(Switzerland) Patric Niederhauser	(New Zealand) Mitch Evans	(Australia) MW Arden	Report
1	R2	(Spain) Circuit de Catalunya		(Philippines) Marlon Stöckinger (Note: Marlon Stöckinger set the fastest lap, but did not finish in the top 10, so was ineligible to be the point-scorer for the fastest lap. Kevin Ceccon was the point-scorer instead for setting the fastest lap of those finishing in the top 10.)	(United States) Conor Daly	(France) Lotus GP	Report
2	R1	Circuit de Monaco	(Finland) Aaro Vainio	(Italy) Kevin Ceccon	(Finland) Aaro Vainio	(France) Lotus GP	Report
2	R2	Circuit de Monaco		(Philippines) Marlon Stöckinger	(Philippines) Marlon Stöckinger	(Republic of Ireland) Status Grand Prix	Report
3	R1	(Spain) Valencia Street Circuit	(New Zealand) Mitch Evans	(New Zealand) Mitch Evans	(New Zealand) Mitch Evans	(Australia) MW Arden	Report
3	R2	(Spain) Valencia Street Circuit		(Portugal) António Félix da Costa	(Switzerland) Patric Niederhauser	(Switzerland) Jenzer Motorsport	Report
4	R1	(United Kingdom) Silverstone Circuit	(New Zealand) Mitch Evans	(Portugal) António Félix da Costa	(Portugal) António Félix da Costa	(United Kingdom) Carlin	Report
4	R2	(United Kingdom) Silverstone Circuit		(Cyprus) Tio Ellinas	(United Kingdom) William Buller	(United Kingdom) Carlin	Report
5	R1	(Germany) Hockenheimring	(Germany) Daniel Abt	(Cyprus) Tio Ellinas	(Switzerland) Patric Niederhauser	(Switzerland) Jenzer Motorsport	Report
5	R2	(Germany) Hockenheimring		(New Zealand) Mitch Evans	(New Zealand) Mitch Evans	(Australia) MW Arden	Report
6	R1	(Hungary) Hungaroring	(Finland) Aaro Vainio	(Portugal) António Félix da Costa	(Portugal) António Félix da Costa	(United Kingdom) Carlin	Report
6	R2	(Hungary) Hungaroring		(New Zealand) Mitch Evans (Note: Mitch Evans set the fastest lap, but did not finish in the top 10, so was ineligible to be the point-scorer for the fastest lap. António Félix da Costa was the point-scorer instead for setting the fastest lap of those finishing in the top 10.)	(Portugal) António Félix da Costa	(United Kingdom) Carlin	Report
7	R1	(Belgium) Circuit de Spa-Francorchamps	(New Zealand) Mitch Evans	(Portugal) António Félix da Costa	(Germany) Daniel Abt	(France) Lotus GP	Report
7	R2	(Belgium) Circuit de Spa-Francorchamps		(Portugal) António Félix da Costa	(Finland) Matias Laine	(Australia) MW Arden	Report
8	R1	(Italy) Autodromo Nazionale Monza	(New Zealand) Mitch Evans	(Cyprus) Tio Ellinas	(Germany) Daniel Abt	(France) Lotus GP	Report
8	R2	(Italy) Autodromo Nazionale Monza		(New Zealand) Mitch Evans (Note: Mitch Evans set the fastest lap, but did not finish in the top 10, so was ineligible to be the point-scorer for the fastest lap. Matias Laine was the point-scorer instead for setting the fastest lap of those finishing in the top 10.)	(Cyprus) Tio Ellinas	(United Kingdom) Marussia Manor Racing	Report

== Championship standings ==
Scoring system

Points were awarded to the top 10 classified finishers in the race 1, and to the top 8 classified finishers in the race 2. The pole-sitter in the race 1 also received four points, and two points were given to the driver who set the fastest lap inside the top ten in both the race 1 and race 2. No extra points were awarded to the pole-sitter in the race 2.

Race 1 points

Position	**1st**	**2nd**	**3rd**	**4th**	**5th**	**6th**	**7th**	**8th**	**9th**	**10th**	**Pole**	**FL**
Points	25	18	15	12	10	8	6	4	2	1	4	2

Race 2 points

Points were awarded to the top 8 classified finishers.

Position	**1st**	**2nd**	**3rd**	**4th**	**5th**	**6th**	**7th**	**8th**	**FL**
Points	15	12	10	8	6	4	2	1	2

=== Drivers' Championship ===
Pos	Driver	CAT (Spain)		MON (Monaco)		VAL (Spain)		SIL (United Kingdom)		HOC (Germany)		HUN (Hungary)		SPA (Note: Half points were awarded for the feature race as less than 75% of the race distance had been completed.) (Belgium)		MNZ (Italy)		Points
1	(New Zealand) Mitch Evans	1	20	5	4	**1**	6	**2**	11	8	1	3	21	**3**	15	**Ret**	20	151.5
2	(Germany) Daniel Abt	13	6	6	3	6	2	4	Ret	**7**	2	2	11	1	5	1	2	149.5
3	(Portugal) António Félix da Costa	**14**	7	7	2	Ret	8	1	6	Ret	Ret	1	1	2	2	15	5	132
4	(Finland) Aaro Vainio	3	4	**1**	7	2	7	3	Ret	5	6	**5**	7	6	14	11	14	123
5	(Finland) Matias Laine	5	3	21	16	5	3	9	18†	4	5	7	6	5	1	3	6	111
6	(United States) Conor Daly	6	1	23	Ret	11	Ret	5	2	2	3	6	9	7	3	4	11	106
7	(Switzerland) Patric Niederhauser	4	5	Ret	15	8	1	10	3	1	9	16	2	11	6	5	Ret	101
8	(Cyprus) Tio Ellinas	7	15	9	8	4	5	6	4	10	7	13	4	4	Ret	2	1	99
9	(Italy) Kevin Ceccon	Ret	10	3	6	7	4	8	7	17	15	4	8	12	20	13	9	56
10	(Philippines) Marlon Stöckinger	2	19	8	1	19	11	16	Ret	16	11	9	13	14	16	7	4	55
11	(Italy) David Fumanelli	9	17	4	5	3	16	DNS	DNS	12	10	8	Ret	20	Ret	6	13	47
12	(Hungary) Tamás Pál Kiss	12	Ret	2	9	9	10	11	14	6	4	14	10	17	10	9	15	38
13	(Italy) Giovanni Venturini							13	16	3	8	11	Ret	9	9	8	3	31
14	(Romania) Robert Vișoiu	8	2	14	10	Ret	12	12	5	DSQ	12	12	22	15	13	14	7	24
15	(United Kingdom) William Buller	23	9	12	Ret	10	9	Ret	1	9	Ret	23	12	13	8	10	12	20
16	(United Kingdom) Alex Brundle	10	8	10	Ret	16	14	7	10	DSQ	13	15	3	19	11	DSQ	10	19
17	(United Kingdom) Lewis Williamson									13	Ret	10	5	8	7	19	Ret	11
18	(Switzerland) Alex Fontana											17	15	10	4			8.5
19	(United Kingdom) Alice Powell	Ret	11	11	22	18	Ret	17	Ret	19	Ret	19	20	18	12	12	8	1
20	(Brazil) Fabio Gamberini							23	8									1
21	(Brazil) Fabiano Machado	16	Ret	15	17	Ret	19	19	9	Ret	Ret	DNS	DNS	25	21	Ret	16	0
22	(Republic of Ireland) Robert Cregan	15	Ret	18	11	15	13	20	15	11	NC	21	14	21	DNS	20	17	0
23	(Russia) Dmitry Suranovich	11	Ret	16	DSQ	Ret	15	22	20†	15	14	Ret	16	22	18	22†	DNS	0
24	(Philippines) Kotaro Sakurai	18	12	13	20			15	13									0
25	(Belgium) John Wartique	21	13	17	13	12	Ret							23	17	17	18	0
26	(Italy) Vicky Piria	22	16	19	12	17	18	18	21†	14	Ret	20	19	16	19	16	Ret	0
27	(Argentina) Facu Regalia							14	12			18	18					0
28	(Spain) Carmen Jordá	20	21	Ret	21	13	Ret	DNQ	DNQ	20	Ret	24†	Ret	26	23	21	19	0
29	(United States) Ethan Ringel	Ret	18	Ret	18	14	Ret	Ret	17	18	16	22	17	24	22	18	Ret	0
30	(Italy) Antonio Spavone	17	Ret	20	14	Ret	17	21	18									0
31	(Czech Republic) Jakub Klášterka	19	14	22	19													0
Pos	Driver	CAT (Spain)		MON (Monaco)		VAL (Spain)		SIL (United Kingdom)		HOC (Germany)		HUN (Hungary)		SPA (Belgium)		MNZ (Italy)		Points

Key
Colour	Result
Gold	Winner
Silver	2nd place
Bronze	3rd place
Green	Other points position
Blue	Other classified position
Blue	Not classified, finished (NC)
Purple	Not classified, retired (Ret)
Red	Did not qualify (DNQ)
Red	Did not pre-qualify (DNPQ)
Black	Disqualified (DSQ)
White	Did not start (DNS)
White	Race cancelled (C)
Blank	Did not practice (DNP)
Blank	Excluded (EX)
Blank	Did not arrive (DNA)
Blank	Withdrawn (WD)
Text formatting	Meaning
**Bold**	Pole position point(s)
Italics	Fastest lap point(s)

Notes:

- † — Drivers did not finish the race, but were classified as they completed over 90% of the race distance.

=== Teams' Championship ===
Pos	Team	Car No.	CAT (Spain)		MON (Monaco)		VAL (Spain)		SIL (United Kingdom)		HOC (Germany)		HUN (Hungary)		SPA (Belgium)		MNZ (Italy)		Points
1	(France) Lotus GP	1	13	6	6	3	6	2	4	Ret	**7**	2	2	11	1	5	1	2	378.5
1	(France) Lotus GP	2	6	1	23†	Ret	11	Ret	5	2	2	3	6	9	7	3	4	11	378.5
1	(France) Lotus GP	3	3	4	**1**	7	2	7	3	Ret	5	6	**5**	7	6	14	11	14	378.5
2	(Australia) MW Arden	4	1	20	5	4	**1**	6	**2**	11	8	1	3	21	**3**	15	**Ret**	20	309.5
2	(Australia) MW Arden	5	9	17	4	5	3	16	DNS	DNS	12	10	8	Ret	20	Ret	6	13	309.5
2	(Australia) MW Arden	6	5	3	21	16	5	3	9	18†	4	5	7	6	5	1	3	6	309.5
3	(United Kingdom) Carlin	26	10	8	10	Ret	16	14	7	10	DSQ	13	15	3	19	11	DSQ	10	171
3	(United Kingdom) Carlin	27	**14**	7	7	2	Ret	8	1	6	Ret	Ret	1	1	2	2	15	5	171
3	(United Kingdom) Carlin	28	23	9	12	Ret	10	9	Ret	1	9	Ret	23	12	13	8	10	12	171
4	(Switzerland) Jenzer Motorsport	20	8	2	14	10	Ret	12	12	5	DSQ	12	12	22	15	13	14	7	133.5
4	(Switzerland) Jenzer Motorsport	21	4	5	Ret	15	8	1	10	3	1	9	16	2	11	6	5	Ret	133.5
4	(Switzerland) Jenzer Motorsport	22	19	14	22	19			14	12			17	15	10	4			133.5
5	(United Kingdom) Marussia Manor Racing	7	11	Ret	16	DSQ	Ret	15	22	20†	15	14	Ret	16	22	18	22†	DNS	99
5	(United Kingdom) Marussia Manor Racing	8	16	Ret	15	17	Ret	19	19	9	Ret	Ret	DNS	DNS	25	21	Ret	16	99
5	(United Kingdom) Marussia Manor Racing	9	7	15	9	8	4	5	6	4	10	7	13	4	4	Ret	2	1	99
6	(Republic of Ireland) Status Grand Prix	14	2	19	8	1	19	11	16	Ret	16	11	9	13	14	16	7	4	67
6	(Republic of Ireland) Status Grand Prix	15	18	12	13	20			15	13	13	Ret	10	5	8	7	19	Ret	67
6	(Republic of Ireland) Status Grand Prix	16	Ret	11	11	22	18	Ret	17	Ret	19	Ret	19	20	18	12	12	8	67
7	(Portugal) Ocean Racing Technology	17	Ret	10	Ret	21	13	Ret	DNQ	DNQ	20	Ret	24†	Ret	26	23	21	19	56
7	(Portugal) Ocean Racing Technology	18	20	21	3	6	7	4	8	7	17	15	4	8	12	20	13	9	56
7	(Portugal) Ocean Racing Technology	19	15	Ret	18	11	15	13	20	15	11	NC	21	14	21	DNS	20	17	56
8	(United Kingdom) Atech CRS GP	29	12	Ret	2	9	9	10	11	14	6	4	14	10	17	10	9	15	39
8	(United Kingdom) Atech CRS GP	30	21	13	17	13	12	Ret	23	8			18	18	23	17	17	18	39
8	(United Kingdom) Atech CRS GP	31	Ret	18	Ret	18	14	Ret	Ret	17	18	16	22	17	24	22	18	Ret	39
9	(Italy) Trident Racing	23	22	16	19	12	17	18	18	21†	14	Ret	20	19	16	19	16	Ret	31
9	(Italy) Trident Racing	24	17	Ret	20	14	Ret	17	21	19									31
9	(Italy) Trident Racing	25							13	16	3	8	11	Ret	9	9	8	3	31
Pos	Team	Car No.	CAT (Spain)		MON (Monaco)		VAL (Spain)		SIL (United Kingdom)		HOC (Germany)		HUN (Hungary)		SPA (Belgium)		MNZ (Italy)		Points

Key
Colour	Result
Gold	Winner
Silver	2nd place
Bronze	3rd place
Green	Other points position
Blue	Other classified position
Blue	Not classified, finished (NC)
Purple	Not classified, retired (Ret)
Red	Did not qualify (DNQ)
Red	Did not pre-qualify (DNPQ)
Black	Disqualified (DSQ)
White	Did not start (DNS)
White	Race cancelled (C)
Blank	Did not practice (DNP)
Blank	Excluded (EX)
Blank	Did not arrive (DNA)
Blank	Withdrawn (WD)
Text formatting	Meaning
**Bold**	Pole position point(s)
Italics	Fastest lap point(s)

Notes:

- † — Drivers did not finish the race, but were classified as they completed over 90% of the race distance.
