= Jakub Klášterka =

Czech racing driver

- Nationality: (Czech Republic) Czech
- Born: 28 April 1994 (age 32) Plzeň, Czech Republic

GP3 Series
- Years active: 2012
- Teams: Jenzer Motorsport
- Starts: 4
- Wins: 0
- Poles: 0
- Fastest laps: 0
- Best finish: 31st in 2012

Previous series
- 2009 2009: Formula Renault 2.0 NEC; Formul'Academy Euro Series

Jakub Klášterka (born 28 April 1994 in Plzeň) is a Czech former racing driver. He has previously competed in the GP3 Series.

== Racing record ==
=== Career summary ===
Season	Series	Team	Races	Wins	Poles	F/Laps	Podiums	Points	Position
2009	Formul'Academy Euro Series	Auto Sport Academy	14	0	0	0	2	33	11th
2009	Formula Renault 2.0 NEC	Krenek Motorsport	2	0	0	0	0	8	35th
2012	GP3 Series	Jenzer Motorsport	4	0	0	0	0	0	31st

=== Complete Formula Renault 2.0 NEC results ===
(key) (Races in bold indicate pole position) (Races in italics indicate fastest lap)

Year	Entrant	1	2	3	4	5	6	7	8	9	10	11	12	13	14	15	16	DC	Points
2009	Krenek Motorsport	ZAN; 1	ZAN; 2	HOC; 1	HOC; 2	ALA; 1	ALA; 2	OSC; 1	OSC; 2	ASS; 1	ASS; 2	MST; 1; 14	MST; 2; 20	NÜR; 1	NÜR; 2	SPA; 1	SPA; 2	35th	8

=== Complete GP3 Series results ===
(key) (Races in bold indicate pole position) (Races in italics indicate fastest lap)

Year	Entrant	1	2	3	4	5	6	7	8	9	10	11	12	13	14	15	16	D.C.	Points
2012	Jenzer Motorsport	CAT; FEA; 19	CAT; SPR; 14	MCO; FEA; 22	MCO; SPR; 19	VAL; FEA	VAL; SPR	SIL; FEA	SIL; SPR	HOC; FEA	HOC; SPR	HUN; FEA	HUN; SPR	SPA; FEA	SPA; SPR	MNZ; FEA	MNZ; SPR	31st	0
