= Robert Cregan =

Irish racing driver

- Nationality: (Republic of Ireland) Irish
- Born: 4 November 1988 (age 38) Dublin, Ireland

Previous series
- 2012 2011 2010-11 2008 2006: GP3 Series; Fujitsu V8 Supercar Series; UAE GT Championship-GTC; Porsche Supercup; FF 1600 Walter Hayes Trophy

Robert Cregan (born 4 November 1988 in Dublin, Ireland) is an Irish former racing driver. He competed in the 2012 GP3 Series season for Ocean Racing Technology. He finished second in the 2010-11 UAE GT Championship - GTC. He is the son of Richard Cregan, who was the team manager of the Toyota Formula One team.

== Career ==
Cregan's racing career began in 2002. He raced in the 2006 Formula Ford 1600 Walter Hayes Trophy, finishing twelfth.

Cregan moved into sportscars in 2008, competing in two races in the 2008 Porsche Supercup season. Cregan finished second in the 2010-11 UAE GT Championship - GTC, winning three of the six races he competed in.

Cregan joined the Fujitsu V8 Supercar Series in 2011, in the process becoming the first Irishman to compete in the series. He competed for Matt Stone Racing in a Ford Falcon (BF) and scored 747 points from the 17 races.

Cregan returned to single-seater racing in 2012 when he competed for Ocean Racing Technology in the 2012 GP3 Series season. He failed to score a point and finished in 22nd in the Drivers' Championship standings.

Cregan returned to the GP3 Series to compete in the final round of the 2013 season with Trident, replacing David Fumanelli. He finished 16th in race 1 and 13th in race 2, placing him 27th in the overall standings.

== Racing record ==
=== Career summary ===
Season	Series	Team	Races	Wins	Poles	F.L.	Podiums	Points	Position
2006	Formula Ford 1600 Walter Hayes Trophy	?	1	0	0	0	0	N/A	12th
2008	Porsche Supercup	Tolimit Motorsport	2	0	0	0	0	0	NC
2010-11	UAE GT Championship - GTC	?	6	3	?	?	4	38	**2nd**
2011	Fujitsu V8 Supercar Series	Matt Stone Racing	17	0	0	0	0	747	12th
2012	GP3 Series	Ocean Racing Technology	16	0	0	0	0	0	22nd
2013	GP3 Series	Trident Racing	2	0	0	0	0	0	27th

=== Complete GP3 Series results ===
(key) (Races in bold indicate pole position) (Races in italics indicate fastest lap)

Year	Entrant	1	2	3	4	5	6	7	8	9	10	11	12	13	14	15	16	D.C.	Points
2012	Ocean Racing Technology	CAT; FEA; 15	CAT; SPR; Ret	MON; FEA; 18	MON; SPR; 11	VAL; FEA; 15	VAL; SPR; 13	SIL; FEA; 20	SIL; SPR; 15	HOC; FEA; 11	HOC; SPR; NC	HUN; FEA; 21	HUN; SPR; 14	SPA; FEA; 21	SPA; SPR; DNS	MNZ; FEA; 20	MNZ; SPR; 17	22nd	0
2013	Trident Racing	CAT; FEA	CAT; SPR	VAL; FEA	VAL; SPR	SIL; FEA	SIL; SPR	NÜR; FEA	NÜR; SPR	HUN; FEA	HUN; SPR	SPA; FEA	SPA; SPR	MNZ; FEA	MNZ; SPR	YMC; FEA; 16	YMC; SPR; 13	27th	0
