= Atech Grand Prix =

British motor racing team

(United Kingdom) Atech Grand Prix
- Founded: 2007
- Team principal(s): David Hayle
- Former series: Superleague Formula; GP3 Series; Formula Renault UK
- Teams' Championships: 2009 Superleague Formula season (Liverpool)

Atech Grand Prix was a British motor racing team.

It was formed in 2007 as Hitech Junior Team by David Hayle, who had sold his successful British Formula 3 team Hitech Racing to Austrian businessman Walter Grubmuller, Sr.

It was renamed Atech Grand Prix at the end of 2009.

The team ran Nick Yelloly, Marlon Stockinger and Tamás Pál Kiss in the 2010 Formula Renault UK Championship, with Pál Kiss challenging for the title until the final round.

2011 saw them run under the Atech Reid GP banner in the 2011 Formula Renault 2.0 UK Championship, after a new collaboration with Reid Motorsport. Former British Formula Ford Championship driver Tio Ellinas raced for them.

In 2013, they were purchased by Bamboo Engineering.

== Results ==
=== GP3 ===
Year	Car	Drivers	Races	Wins	Poles	Fast laps	Points	D.C.	T.C.
2010	Dallara GP3/10-Renault	(Italy) Patrick Reiterer	4	0	0	0	0	33rd	7th
2010	Dallara GP3/10-Renault	(Spain) Roberto Merhi	12	0	0	0	26	6th	7th
2010	Dallara GP3/10-Renault	(United Kingdom) Oliver Oakes	16	0	0	0	0	28th	7th
2010	Dallara GP3/10-Renault	(Italy) Vittorio Ghirelli	16	0	0	0	0	34th	7th
2011	Dallara GP3/10-Renault	(Philippines) Marlon Stöckinger	16	0	0	0	0	29th	10th
2011	Dallara GP3/10-Renault	(United Kingdom) Nick Yelloly	16	0	0	0	7	21st	10th
2011	Dallara GP3/10-Renault	(Switzerland) Zoël Amberg	16	0	0	0	0	28th	10th
2012	Dallara GP3/10-Renault	(Hungary) Tamás Pál Kiss	16	0	0	0	38	12th	8th
2012	Dallara GP3/10-Renault	(Belgium) John Wartique	10	0	0	0	0	25th	8th
2012	Dallara GP3/10-Renault	(United States) Ethan Ringel	16	0	0	0	0	29th	8th
2012	Dallara GP3/10-Renault	(Brazil) Fabio Gamberini	2	0	0	0	1	20th	8th
2012	Dallara GP3/10-Renault	(Argentina) Facu Regalia	4	0	0	0	0	27th	8th

=== In detail ===
(key) (Races in bold indicate pole position) (Races in italics indicate fastest lap)

Year	Chassis Engine Tyres	Drivers	1	2	3	4	5	6	7	8	9	10	11	12	13	14	15	16	T.C.	Points
2010	GP3/10; Renault; **P**		CAT; FEA	CAT; SPR	IST; FEA	IST; SPR	VAL; FEA	VAL; SPR	SIL; FEA	SIL; SPR	HOC; FEA	HOC; SPR	HUN; FEA	HUN; SPR	SPA; FEA	SPA; SPR	MNZ; FEA	MNZ; SPR	7th	26
2010	GP3/10; Renault; **P**	(Italy) Patrick Reiterer	NC	17	14	25													7th	26
2010	GP3/10; Renault; **P**	(Spain) Roberto Merhi					3	2	Ret	19	16	Ret	Ret	22	2	22^{†}	6	4	7th	26
2010	GP3/10; Renault; **P**	(United Kingdom) Oliver Oakes	14	10	12	Ret	Ret	19	13	8	13	20^{†}	16	10	17	10	12	9	7th	26
2010	GP3/10; Renault; **P**	(Italy) Vittorio Ghirelli	DNS	DNS	17	26	20	22	20	21	15	16	24	15	Ret	Ret	23	21	7th	26
2011	GP3/10; Renault; **P**		IST; FEA	IST; SPR	CAT; FEA	CAT; SPR	VAL; FEA	VAL; SPR	SIL; FEA	SIL; SPR	NÜR; FEA	NÜR; SPR	HUN; FEA	HUN; SPR	SPA; FEA	SPA; SPR	MNZ; FEA	MNZ; SPR	10th	7
2011	GP3/10; Renault; **P**	(Philippines) Marlon Stöckinger	Ret	23	26	Ret	14	16	16	Ret	Ret	DNS	12	17	Ret	10	19	13	10th	7
2011	GP3/10; Renault; **P**	(United Kingdom) Nick Yelloly	13	11	25	18	9	12	3	6	16	9	21	Ret	Ret	13	Ret	Ret	10th	7
2011	GP3/10; Renault; **P**	(Switzerland) Zoël Amberg	12	14	16	10	11	18	Ret	16	21	20	15	16	Ret	12	Ret	Ret	10th	7
2012	GP3/10; Renault; **P**		CAT; FEA	CAT; SPR	MON; FEA	MON; SPR	VAL; FEA	VAL; SPR	SIL; FEA	SIL; SPR	HOC; FEA	HOC; SPR	HUN; FEA	HUN; SPR	SPA; FEA	SPA; SPR	MNZ; FEA	MNZ; SPR	8th	39
2012	GP3/10; Renault; **P**	(Hungary) Tamás Pál Kiss	12	Ret	2	9	9	10	11	14	6	4	14	10	17	10	9	15	8th	39
2012	GP3/10; Renault; **P**	(Belgium) John Wartique	21	13	17	13	12	Ret							23	17	17	18	8th	39
2012	GP3/10; Renault; **P**	(Brazil) Fabio Gamberini							23	8									8th	39
2012	GP3/10; Renault; **P**	(Argentina) Facu Regalia											18	18					8th	39
2012	GP3/10; Renault; **P**	(United States) Ethan Ringel	Ret	18	Ret	18	14	Ret	Ret	17	18	16	22	17	24	22	18	Ret	8th	39
