= 2010 World Series by Renault =

Seasons
- ← 2009 2011 →

The 2010 World Series by Renault was the sixth season of Renault Sport's series of events, with four different championships racing under one banner. Consisting of the Formula Renault 3.5 Series, Eurocup Formula Renault 2.0, the Eurocup Mégane Trophy and F4 Eurocup 1.6, the World Series by Renault ran at eight different venues, where fans could get into the meetings for no cost whatsoever, such is the uniqueness of the series.

The series began on 17 April at the Ciudad del Motor de Aragón in Alcañiz, and finished on 10 October at the Circuit de Catalunya, just outside Barcelona. 2010 saw the season-opening and season-closing rounds from 2009 reverse, with Catalunya hosting the season finale rather than the season opener, with the opposite occurring for Aragón. The series also visited Belgium, the Czech Republic, France, Hungary, Germany and the United Kingdom during the season, while Formula Renault 3.5 had an extra race on its own, in support of the Monaco Grand Prix in May. The F4 Eurocup – making its debut on the World Series by Renault programme in 2010 – did not visit Brno, and thus that championship's calendar was only seven rounds. The Eurocup Mégane Trophy began at Spa-Francorchamps.

== Review ==
=== Formula Renault 3.5 Series ===
The 2010 season began with a race of attrition at Motorland Aragón, with just nine of the 24 starters running at the race's conclusion. Russian driver Mikhail Aleshin, returning to the series from a year in the FIA Formula Two Championship took the spoils ahead of rookie Daniel Zampieri and pole-sitter Daniel Ricciardo. In race two, Sten Pentus took his first victory, ahead of Jan Charouz and Ricciardo. However, Charouz was disqualified after the race due to a technical irregularity, which promoted Ricciardo to second place and Nathanaël Berthon to third. Aleshin took a second win in the first race at Circuit de Spa-Francorchamps ahead of Pentus and Stefano Coletti. In the second race, Esteban Guerrieri took the first win for ISR Racing in the series, after taking advantage of drive-through penalties for several of his rivals. Zampieri took his second runner-up placing with Coletti again finishing third. Ricciardo took his first victory in the Monaco Grand Prix-supporting round, ahead of Aleshin and Epsilon Euskadi rookie Albert Costa, while Guerrieri missed the round due to budgetary concerns and was replaced by GP3 frontrunner Alexander Rossi, who retired from the race.

Guerrieri returned to the series at the next round at Brno, which hosted its first event. Guerrieri's team-mate Filip Salaquarda had qualified on pole for both races, but it was Guerrieri who led the field to the flag each time, taking his victory total for the season to three and moved himself back in the running for the championship as he lay seven points behind Aleshin. Aleshin took his third victory of the season at Magny-Cours, while Berthon picked up his only win of the season in the second race, and thus Aleshin extended his championship lead at the halfway stage, leading with 75 points to Ricciardo's 66 and Guerrieri's 59. Guerrieri's title chances hit a snag, after ISR elected to miss the meeting due to damaged chassis; Ricciardo and Aleshin took advantage scoring 20 and 22 points respectively, while Pentus took his first victory since Aragón to move ahead of Guerrieri in the championship standings.

After a two-month summer break, Hockenheim held the next round of the championship, in which Ricciardo and Guerrieri claimed the victories with Aleshin's championship lead cut to ten points over Ricciardo with Guerrieri a further sixteen behind. At Silverstone, Guerrieri took his fifth victory on the road in the opening race, but was disqualified on a technical infringement, giving victory to Ricciardo's team-mate Jean-Éric Vergne. Vergne was making only his third start in the series after replacing Brendon Hartley at Tech 1 Racing, having already secured the British Formula 3 Championship in dominant fashion. Ricciardo himself was in the wars after rolling his car just yards after the start of the race, due to a collision with Fortec Motorsport's Jon Lancaster. Guerrieri did secure his fifth win at Silverstone, taking the second race ahead of Ricciardo and Vergne and moved within 16 points of Aleshin with a round to go. In Barcelona, Ricciardo won the opening race with Aleshin second to leave both drivers going into the final race with 128 points apiece and mathematically eliminated Guerrieri from title contention. While Guerrieri won the final race ahead of Vergne, Ricciardo and Aleshin did battle over third position and the championship, with Aleshin prevailing thanks to a move with three laps to go, giving Aleshin his first major championship title. Tech 1 easily claimed the teams' championship, 72 points ahead of closest rivals ISR.

=== Eurocup Formula Renault 2.0 ===
The series had a new look for 2010, with the introduction of the Barazi-Epsilon chassis to replace the original Tatuus chassis which had been the mainstay of Formula Renault 2.0 during the 2000s. Both season-opening races at Motorland Aragón were won by Eurocup debutant Kevin Korjus, who had moved up from the Formula Renault 2.0 Northern European Cup over the off-season. Four other drivers appeared on the podium over the weekend, as Korjus left Spain with a 12-point championship lead. Arthur Pic took his first Eurocup win at Spa, but Korjus finished second in order to extend his championship lead over Luciano Bacheta. He extended this further, with his third win of the season at Spa. Pic dominated at Brno winning both races from pole position, as Korjus finished off the podium in both races, losing eight points to Bacheta who finished third in each race. Korjus returned to form at Magny-Cours taking his fourth win as well as a third place finish, giving him a 30-point lead over Bacheta at the midway point with Pic two points behind in third. Giovanni Venturini claimed the other race win, for his only victory of the season.

Pic and Bacheta shared the wins at the Hungaroring with Pic moving into second place behind Korjus after Bacheta's 18th in the opening race, after being involved in an accident with Korjus, who suffered his only retirement of the season. He finished the other race in sixth – fifth-placed points due to guest driver Will Stevens finishing in fourth – and thus still held an 11-point lead over Pic, with Bacheta a further ten behind in third. It would be as close as the pair would get as Korjus unleashed a dominating finish to the championship, amassing a tally of 87 points out of a possible 90 at the final three meetings, with five wins and a second place. Bacheta took the other victory – although second on the road behind guest Javier Tarancón – but it was not until the final race before the runner-up placing was decided. Pic held a five-point advantage over Bacheta before the final race, but was decided in Bacheta's favour after Pic was disqualified for failing to observe a drive-through penalty for short-cutting a chicane while attempting to pass team-mate Carlos Sainz Jr. who was competing as a guest.

=== Eurocup Mégane Trophy ===
The opening race of the series was cancelled after a technical problem during the start procedure. The race was not made up, thus reducing the calendar to 13 races. Dimitri Enjalbert, the driver with the most wins in 2009, claimed the victory in the single race to be held, which was ultimately his only victory of the entire season. At Brno, Stefano Comini added a first and a second to his third from Spa, and moved into an early championship lead ahead of Pierre Thiriet and Nick Catsburg, who won the other race. Thiriet and Catsburg each won a race at Magny-Cours and the Hungaroring to move themselves ahead of Comini in the championship, who struggled to keep with the pair, amassing just ten points over the two meetings. Catsburg then dominated the rest of the season, winning four of the remaining six races with two second places to take TDS Racing's first title since Michaël Rossi in 2008. Thiriet finished second, 27 points behind Catsburg with four further podiums in the same period. Comini finished third taking the two victories that Catsburg did not take over the final three meetings. TDS easily won the teams' title, amassing nearly double the points tally of the second-placed Oregon Team.

=== F4 Eurocup 1.6 ===
In its only season on the World Series package, 1600cc Formula Renault cars provided two wet races in Spain, with Stoffel Vandoorne and Norman Nato sharing the race victories. Vandoorne took two wins at Spa, as he extended his championship lead yet further. Franck Matelli took his only victory of the season at Magny-Cours, while Vandoorne took his fourth win in six races to leave the meeting with a comfortable 35-point lead over Matelli. Mathieu Jaminet took both wins at the Hungaroring, as Vandoorne suffered his worst weekend of the season, amassing just eight points but with Matelli only scoring two more, Vandoorne still had a 28-point lead over Nato by the time the series returned after its summer break. A double win for Vandoorne at Hockenheim moved him within sight of the championship, which he ultimately clinched with a meeting to spare, thanks to a second place finish in the second Silverstone race, where both races were won by Paul-Loup Chatin, moving into third place in the championship in the process. Nato and Jaminet clinched second and third in the championship by each taking a win in Barcelona.

== Race calendar ==
- Event in light blue is not part of the World Series, but is a championship round for the Formula Renault 3.5 Series.

Circuit	Location	Date	Series	Winning driver	Winning team
(Spain) Ciudad del Motor de Aragón	Alcañiz, Spain	17 April	FR3.5 1	(Russia) Mikhail Aleshin	(United Kingdom) Carlin
(Spain) Ciudad del Motor de Aragón	Alcañiz, Spain	17 April	FR2.0 1	(Estonia) Kevin Korjus	(Finland) Koiranen Bros. Motorsport
(Spain) Ciudad del Motor de Aragón	Alcañiz, Spain	17 April	F4 1	(France) Norman Nato	(France) Autosport Academy
(Spain) Ciudad del Motor de Aragón	Alcañiz, Spain	18 April	FR3.5 2	(Estonia) Sten Pentus	(United Kingdom) Fortec Motorsport
(Spain) Ciudad del Motor de Aragón	Alcañiz, Spain	18 April	FR2.0 2	(Estonia) Kevin Korjus	(Finland) Koiranen Bros. Motorsport
(Spain) Ciudad del Motor de Aragón	Alcañiz, Spain	18 April	F4 2	(Belgium) Stoffel Vandoorne	(France) Autosport Academy
(Belgium) Circuit de Spa-Francorchamps	Spa, Belgium	1 May	FR3.5 3	(Russia) Mikhail Aleshin	(United Kingdom) Carlin
(Belgium) Circuit de Spa-Francorchamps	Spa, Belgium	1 May	FR2.0 3	(France) Arthur Pic	(France) Tech 1 Racing
(Belgium) Circuit de Spa-Francorchamps	Spa, Belgium	1 May	EMT 1	race cancelled	
(Belgium) Circuit de Spa-Francorchamps	Spa, Belgium	1 May	F4 3	(Belgium) Stoffel Vandoorne	(France) Autosport Academy
(Belgium) Circuit de Spa-Francorchamps	Spa, Belgium	2 May	FR3.5 4	(Argentina) Esteban Guerrieri	(Czech Republic) ISR Racing
(Belgium) Circuit de Spa-Francorchamps	Spa, Belgium	2 May	FR2.0 4	(Estonia) Kevin Korjus	(Finland) Koiranen Bros. Motorsport
(Belgium) Circuit de Spa-Francorchamps	Spa, Belgium	2 May	EMT 2	(France) Dimitri Enjalbert	(Belgium) Boutsen Energy Racing
(Belgium) Circuit de Spa-Francorchamps	Spa, Belgium	2 May	F4 4	(Belgium) Stoffel Vandoorne	(France) Autosport Academy
Circuit de Monaco	Monte Carlo, Monaco	16 May	FR3.5 5	(Australia) Daniel Ricciardo	(France) Tech 1 Racing
(Czech Republic) Masaryk Circuit	Brno, Czech Republic	5 June	FR3.5 6	(Argentina) Esteban Guerrieri	(Czech Republic) ISR Racing
(Czech Republic) Masaryk Circuit	Brno, Czech Republic	5 June	FR2.0 5	(France) Arthur Pic	(France) Tech 1 Racing
(Czech Republic) Masaryk Circuit	Brno, Czech Republic	5 June	EMT 3	(Switzerland) Stefano Comini	(Italy) Oregon Team
(Czech Republic) Masaryk Circuit	Brno, Czech Republic	6 June	FR3.5 7	(Argentina) Esteban Guerrieri	(Czech Republic) ISR Racing
(Czech Republic) Masaryk Circuit	Brno, Czech Republic	6 June	FR2.0 6	(France) Arthur Pic	(France) Tech 1 Racing
(Czech Republic) Masaryk Circuit	Brno, Czech Republic	6 June	EMT 4	(Netherlands) Nick Catsburg	(France) TDS Racing
(France) Circuit de Nevers Magny-Cours	Magny-Cours, France	19 June	FR3.5 8	(Russia) Mikhail Aleshin	(United Kingdom) Carlin
(France) Circuit de Nevers Magny-Cours	Magny-Cours, France	19 June	FR2.0 7	(Estonia) Kevin Korjus	(Finland) Koiranen Bros. Motorsport
(France) Circuit de Nevers Magny-Cours	Magny-Cours, France	19 June	EMT 5	(Netherlands) Nick Catsburg	(France) TDS Racing
(France) Circuit de Nevers Magny-Cours	Magny-Cours, France	19 June	F4 5	(France) Franck Matelli	(France) Autosport Academy
(France) Circuit de Nevers Magny-Cours	Magny-Cours, France	20 June	FR3.5 9	(France) Nathanaël Berthon	(Spain) International DracoRacing
(France) Circuit de Nevers Magny-Cours	Magny-Cours, France	20 June	FR2.0 8	(Italy) Giovanni Venturini	(Spain) Epsilon Euskadi
(France) Circuit de Nevers Magny-Cours	Magny-Cours, France	20 June	EMT 6	(France) Pierre Thiriet	(France) TDS Racing
(France) Circuit de Nevers Magny-Cours	Magny-Cours, France	20 June	F4 6	(Belgium) Stoffel Vandoorne	(France) Autosport Academy
(Hungary) Hungaroring	Mogyoród, Hungary	3 July	FR3.5 10	(Australia) Daniel Ricciardo	(France) Tech 1 Racing
(Hungary) Hungaroring	Mogyoród, Hungary	3 July	FR2.0 9	(France) Arthur Pic	(France) Tech 1 Racing
(Hungary) Hungaroring	Mogyoród, Hungary	3 July	EMT 7	(France) Pierre Thiriet	(France) TDS Racing
(Hungary) Hungaroring	Mogyoród, Hungary	3 July	F4 7	(France) Mathieu Jaminet	(France) Autosport Academy
(Hungary) Hungaroring	Mogyoród, Hungary	4 July	FR3.5 11	(Estonia) Sten Pentus	(United Kingdom) Fortec Motorsport
(Hungary) Hungaroring	Mogyoród, Hungary	4 July	FR2.0 10	(United Kingdom) Luciano Bacheta	(Austria) Interwetten Junior Team
(Hungary) Hungaroring	Mogyoród, Hungary	4 July	EMT 8	(Netherlands) Nick Catsburg	(France) TDS Racing
(Hungary) Hungaroring	Mogyoród, Hungary	4 July	F4 8	(France) Mathieu Jaminet	(France) Autosport Academy
(Germany) Hockenheimring	Hockenheim, Germany	4 September	FR3.5 12	(Australia) Daniel Ricciardo	(France) Tech 1 Racing
(Germany) Hockenheimring	Hockenheim, Germany	4 September	FR2.0 11	(Estonia) Kevin Korjus	(Finland) Koiranen Bros. Motorsport
(Germany) Hockenheimring	Hockenheim, Germany	4 September	EMT 9	(Netherlands) Nick Catsburg	(France) TDS Racing
(Germany) Hockenheimring	Hockenheim, Germany	4 September	F4 9	(Belgium) Stoffel Vandoorne	(France) Autosport Academy
(Germany) Hockenheimring	Hockenheim, Germany	5 September	FR3.5 13	(Argentina) Esteban Guerrieri	(Czech Republic) ISR Racing
(Germany) Hockenheimring	Hockenheim, Germany	5 September	FR2.0 12	(Estonia) Kevin Korjus	(Finland) Koiranen Bros. Motorsport
(Germany) Hockenheimring	Hockenheim, Germany	5 September	EMT 10	(Switzerland) Stefano Comini	(Italy) Oregon Racing
(Germany) Hockenheimring	Hockenheim, Germany	5 September	F4 10	(Belgium) Stoffel Vandoorne	(France) Autosport Academy
(United Kingdom) Silverstone Circuit	Silverstone, United Kingdom	18 September	FR3.5 14	(France) Jean-Éric Vergne	(France) Tech 1 Racing
(United Kingdom) Silverstone Circuit	Silverstone, United Kingdom	18 September	FR2.0 13	(Estonia) Kevin Korjus	(Finland) Koiranen Bros. Motorsport
(United Kingdom) Silverstone Circuit	Silverstone, United Kingdom	18 September	EMT 11	(Switzerland) Stefano Comini	(Italy) Oregon Racing
(United Kingdom) Silverstone Circuit	Silverstone, United Kingdom	18 September	F4 11	(France) Paul-Loup Chatin	(France) Autosport Academy
(United Kingdom) Silverstone Circuit	Silverstone, United Kingdom	19 September	FR3.5 15	(Argentina) Esteban Guerrieri	(Czech Republic) ISR Racing
(United Kingdom) Silverstone Circuit	Silverstone, United Kingdom	19 September	FR2.0 14	(Spain) Javier Tarancón	(Spain) Epsilon Euskadi
(United Kingdom) Silverstone Circuit	Silverstone, United Kingdom	19 September	EMT 12	(Netherlands) Nick Catsburg	(France) TDS Racing
(United Kingdom) Silverstone Circuit	Silverstone, United Kingdom	19 September	F4 12	(France) Paul-Loup Chatin	(France) Autosport Academy
(Spain) Circuit de Catalunya	Montmeló, Spain	9 October	FR3.5 16	(Australia) Daniel Ricciardo	(France) Tech 1 Racing
(Spain) Circuit de Catalunya	Montmeló, Spain	9 October	FR2.0 15	(Estonia) Kevin Korjus	(Finland) Koiranen Bros. Motorsport
(Spain) Circuit de Catalunya	Montmeló, Spain	9 October	EMT 13	(Netherlands) Nick Catsburg	(France) TDS Racing
(Spain) Circuit de Catalunya	Montmeló, Spain	9 October	F4 13	(France) Mathieu Jaminet	(France) Autosport Academy
(Spain) Circuit de Catalunya	Montmeló, Spain	10 October	FR3.5 17	(Argentina) Esteban Guerrieri	(Czech Republic) ISR Racing
(Spain) Circuit de Catalunya	Montmeló, Spain	10 October	FR2.0 16	(Estonia) Kevin Korjus	(Finland) Koiranen Bros. Motorsport
(Spain) Circuit de Catalunya	Montmeló, Spain	10 October	EMT 14	(Netherlands) Nick Catsburg	(France) TDS Racing
(Spain) Circuit de Catalunya	Montmeló, Spain	10 October	F4 14	(France) Norman Nato	(France) Autosport Academy

Icon	Championship
FR3.5	Formula Renault 3.5 Series
FR2.0	Eurocup Formula Renault 2.0
EMT	Eurocup Mégane Trophy
F4	F4 Eurocup 1.6

== Championships ==
=== Formula Renault 3.5 Series ===
Pos.	Driver	Team	Points
1	(Russia) Mikhail Aleshin	(United Kingdom) Carlin	138
2	(Australia) Daniel Ricciardo	(France) Tech 1 Racing	136
3	(Argentina) Esteban Guerrieri	(Czech Republic) ISR Racing	123
4	(Estonia) Sten Pentus	(United Kingdom) Fortec Motorsport	78
5	(Spain) Albert Costa	(Spain) Epsilon Euskadi	78

=== Eurocup Formula Renault 2.0 ===
Pos.	Driver	Team	Points
1	(Estonia) Kevin Korjus	(Finland) Koiranen Bros. Motorsport	187
2	(United Kingdom) Luciano Bacheta	(Austria) Interwetten Junior Team	124
3	(France) Arthur Pic	(France) Tech 1 Racing	123
4	(Finland) Aaro Vainio	(France) Tech 1 Racing	101
5	(Italy) Giovanni Venturini	(Spain) Epsilon Euskadi	76

=== Eurocup Mégane Trophy ===
Pos.	Driver	Team	Points
1	(Netherlands) Nick Catsburg	(France) TDS Racing	161
2	(France) Pierre Thiriet	(France) TDS Racing	134
3	(Switzerland) Stefano Comini	(Italy) Oregon Team	107
4	(Netherlands) Bas Schothorst	(Netherlands) McGregor by Equipe Verschuur	88
5	(France) Dimitri Enjalbert	(Belgium) Boutsen Energy Racing	67

=== F4 Eurocup 1.6 ===
Pos.	Driver	Team	Points
1	(Belgium) Stoffel Vandoorne	(France) Autosport Academy	159
2	(France) Norman Nato	(France) Autosport Academy	123
3	(France) Mathieu Jaminet	(France) Autosport Academy	112
4	(France) Paul-Loup Chatin	(France) Autosport Academy	103
5	(France) Franck Matelli	(France) Autosport Academy	96
