= 2013 Ricardo Tormo GP3 Series round =

(Spain) 2013 Ricardo Tormo GP3 round
Round details
- Round 2 of 8 rounds in the 2013 GP3 Series
- Location: Circuit Ricardo Tormo, Cheste, Spain
- Course: Permanent racing facility 4.005 km (2.488 mi)

GP3 Series

Race 1
- Date: 16 June 2013
- Laps: 18

Pole position
Driver	(United States) Conor Daly	ART Grand Prix
- Time: 1:22.329

Podium
First	(United States) Conor Daly	ART Grand Prix
Second	(Argentina) Facu Regalia	ART Grand Prix
Third	(Estonia) Kevin Korjus	Koiranen GP

Fastest lap
Driver	(Spain) Carlos Sainz Jr.	MW Arden
- Time: 1:24.573 (on lap 9)

Race 2
- Date: 16 June 2013
- Laps: 18

Podium
First	(Romania) Robert Vișoiu	MW Arden
Second	(Finland) Aaro Vainio	Koiranen GP
Third	(Spain) Carlos Sainz Jr.	MW Arden

Fastest lap
Driver	(United Kingdom) Melville McKee (Note: Melville McKee set the fastest lap, but did not finish in the top 10, so was ineligible to be the point-scorer for the fastest lap. Carlos Sainz Jr. was the point-scorer instead for setting the fastest lap of those finishing in the top 10.)	Bamboo Engineering
- Time: 1:37.654 (on lap 4)

The 2013 Ricardo Tormo GP3 Series round was the second round of the 2013 GP3 Series. It was held on 16 June 2013 at the Circuit Ricardo Tormo in Cheste, Spain as a stand-alone event.

== Classification ==
=== Summary ===
Conor Daly claimed his first GP3 pole position in qualifying. He led every lap to win the race, followed by Facu Regalia, making it a 1-2 result for ART Grand Prix. After being excluded from his third-place qualifying result, Nick Yelloly made a strong comeback to finish 12th.

Robert Vișoiu started on pole for the reverse grid race 2. He made a good start and led every lap to win the race, 7.7 seconds ahead of Aaro Vainio. Carlos Sainz Jr. overtook Tio Ellinas on the opening lap to finish third, his first GP3 podium. Fourth place was enough for Ellinas to keep the championship lead, 4 points ahead of Daly.

=== Qualifying ===
Pos.	No.	Driver	Team	Time	Grid
1	1	(United States) Conor Daly	ART Grand Prix	1:22.329	1
2	6	(Russia) Daniil Kvyat	MW Arden	1:22.536	2
3	8	(United Kingdom) Nick Yelloly	Carlin	1:22.597	26 ^{1}
4	2	(Argentina) Facu Regalia	ART Grand Prix	1:22.603	3
5	27	(Finland) Aaro Vainio	Koiranen GP	1:22.616	4
6	28	(Estonia) Kevin Korjus	Koiranen GP	1:22.621	5
7	14	(Cyprus) Tio Ellinas	Marussia Manor Racing	1:22.761	6
8	16	(United Kingdom) Dino Zamparelli	Marussia Manor Racing	1:22.861	7
9	4	(Spain) Carlos Sainz Jr.	MW Arden	1:22.891	8
10	5	(Romania) Robert Vișoiu	MW Arden	1:22.893	9
11	3	(United Kingdom) Jack Harvey	ART Grand Prix	1:22.925	10
12	25	(Italy) David Fumanelli	Trident	1:22.936	11
13	20	(United Kingdom) Lewis Williamson	Bamboo Engineering	1:22.948	27 ^{1}
14	21	(United Kingdom) Melville McKee	Bamboo Engineering	1:22.954	12
15	23	(Italy) Giovanni Venturini	Trident	1:22.993	13
16	11	(Switzerland) Patric Niederhauser	Jenzer Motorsport	1:23.000	14
17	12	(Switzerland) Alex Fontana	Jenzer Motorsport	1:23.019	15
18	18	(Hong Kong) Adderly Fong	Status Grand Prix	1:23.054	16
19	26	(Finland) Patrick Kujala	Koiranen GP	1:23.294	25 ^{2}
20	9	(Argentina) Eric Lichtenstein	Carlin	1:23.364	17
21	25	(San Marino) Emanuele Zonzini	Trident	1:23.524	18
22	19	(United Kingdom) Josh Webster	Status Grand Prix	1:23.559	19
23	7	(Macau) Luís Sá Silva	Carlin	1:23.878	20
24	10	(Venezuela) Samin Gómez	Jenzer Motorsport	1:24.322	21
25	17	(Sweden) Jimmy Eriksson	Status Grand Prix	1:25.044	22
26	22	(Spain) Carmen Jordá	Bamboo Engineering	1:25.103	23
27	15	(United Kingdom) Ryan Cullen	Marussia Manor Racing	1:41.349	24 ^{3}

- ^1 Nick Yelloly and Lewis Williamson were disqualified from qualifying because their cars did not comply with the regulations.
- ^2 Patrick Kujala received a ten-place grid penalty for passing Aaro Vainio under the red flag.
- ^3 Ryan Cullen had a five-place grid penalty to serve from Barcelona.

=== Feature race ===
Pos.	No.	Driver	Team	Laps	Time/Retired	Grid	Points
1	1	(United States) Conor Daly	ART Grand Prix	18	25:54.812	1	29 (25+4)
2	2	(Argentina) Facu Regalia	ART Grand Prix	18	+1.210	3	18
3	28	(Estonia) Kevin Korjus	Koiranen GP	18	+3.401	5	15
4	6	(Russia) Daniil Kvyat	MW Arden	18	+3.773	2	12
5	4	(Spain) Carlos Sainz Jr.	MW Arden	18	+4.413	8	12 (10+2)
6	14	(Cyprus) Tio Ellinas	Marussia Manor Racing	18	+6.196	6	8
7	27	(Finland) Aaro Vainio	Koiranen GP	18	+9.084	4	6
8	5	(Romania) Robert Vișoiu	MW Arden	18	+13.504	9	4
9	16	(United Kingdom) Dino Zamparelli	Marussia Manor Racing	18	+14.145	7	2
10	3	(United Kingdom) Jack Harvey	ART Grand Prix	18	+14.547	10	1
11	21	(United Kingdom) Melville McKee	Bamboo Engineering	18	+20.833	12	
12	8	(United Kingdom) Nick Yelloly	Carlin	18	+20.965	26	
13	11	(Switzerland) Patric Niederhauser	Jenzer Motorsport	18	+21.342	14	
14	12	(Switzerland) Alex Fontana	Jenzer Motorsport	18	+21.626	15	
15	23	(Italy) Giovanni Venturini	Trident	18	+21.927	13	
16	25	(San Marino) Emanuele Zonzini	Trident	18	+22.070	18	
17	19	(United Kingdom) Josh Webster	Status Grand Prix	18	+26.458	19	
18	17	(Sweden) Jimmy Eriksson	Status Grand Prix	18	+26.978	22	
19	20	(United Kingdom) Lewis Williamson	Bamboo Engineering	18	+27.387	27	
20	15	(United Kingdom) Ryan Cullen	Marussia Manor Racing	18	+36.843	24	
21	26	(Finland) Patrick Kujala	Koiranen GP	18	+46.218	25	
Ret	7	(Macau) Luís Sá Silva	Carlin	2	Retired	20	
Ret	10	(Venezuela) Samin Gómez	Jenzer Motorsport	1	Retired	21	
Ret	9	(Argentina) Eric Lichtenstein	Carlin	0	Retired	17	
Ret	22	(Spain) Carmen Jordá	Bamboo Engineering	0	Retired	23	
Ret	24	(Italy) David Fumanelli	Trident	0	Retired	11	
Ret	18	(Hong Kong) Adderly Fong	Status Grand Prix	0	Retired	16	
Fastest lap: Carlos Sainz Jr. (MW Arden) — 1:24.573 (on lap 5)

=== Sprint race ===
Pos.	No.	Driver	Team	Laps	Time/Retired	Grid	Points
1	5	(Romania) Robert Vișoiu	MW Arden	18	25:50:517	1	15
2	27	(Finland) Aaro Vainio	Koiranen GP	18	+7.784	2	12
3	4	(Spain) Carlos Sainz Jr.	MW Arden	18	+7.920	4	12 (10+2)
4	14	(Cyprus) Tio Ellinas	Marussia Manor Racing	18	+8.572	3	8
5	6	(Russia) Daniil Kvyat	MW Arden	18	+9.017	5	6
6	28	(Estonia) Kevin Korjus	Koiranen GP	18	+23.961	6	4
7	2	(Argentina) Facu Regalia	ART Grand Prix	18	+24.472	7	2
8	1	(United States) Conor Daly	ART Grand Prix	18	+24.768	8	1
9	8	(United Kingdom) Nick Yelloly	Carlin	18	+25.164	12	
10	16	(United Kingdom) Dino Zamparelli	Marussia Manor Racing	18	+26.566	9	
11	12	(Switzerland) Alex Fontana	Jenzer Motorsport	18	+26.719	14	
12	3	(United Kingdom) Jack Harvey	ART Grand Prix	18	+27.648	10	
13	23	(Italy) Giovanni Venturini	Trident	18	+27.779	15	
14	25	(San Marino) Emanuele Zonzini	Trident	18	+28.116	16	
15	26	(Finland) Patrick Kujala	Koiranen GP	18	+35.495	21	
16	17	(Sweden) Jimmy Eriksson	Status Grand Prix	18	+36.183	18	
17	20	(United Kingdom) Lewis Williamson	Bamboo Engineering	18	+38.816	19	
18	19	(United Kingdom) Josh Webster	Status Grand Prix	18	+38.982	17	
19	10	(Venezuela) Samin Gómez	Jenzer Motorsport	18	+39.244	23	
20	15	(United Kingdom) Ryan Cullen	Marussia Manor Racing	18	+50.937	20	
21	22	(Spain) Carmen Jordá	Bamboo Engineering	18	+55.029	25	
22	7	(Macau) Luís Sá Silva	Carlin	17	+1 Lap	22	
Ret	21	(United Kingdom) Melville McKee	Bamboo Engineering	10	Retired	11	
Ret	11	(Switzerland) Patric Niederhauser	Jenzer Motorsport	9	Retired	13	
Ret	9	(Argentina) Eric Lichtenstein	Carlin	1	Retired	24	
Ret	24	(Italy) David Fumanelli	Trident	0	Retired	26	
Ret	18	(Hong Kong) Adderly Fong	Status Grand Prix	0	Retired	27	
Fastest lap: Melville McKee (Bamboo Engineering) — 1:24.487 (on lap 9)

== Standings after the round ==
Drivers' Championship standings

	Pos.	Driver	Points
	1	(Cyprus) Tio Ellinas	55
2	2	(United States) Conor Daly	51
	3	(Finland) Aaro Vainio	43
1	4	(Estonia) Kevin Korjus	37
3	5	(Switzerland) Patric Niederhauser	28

Teams' Championship standings

	Pos.	Team	Points
2	1	(France) ART Grand Prix	84
1	2	(Finland) Koiranen GP	80
5	3	(Australia) MW Arden	63
2	4	(United Kingdom) Marussia Manor Racing	57
1	5	(Switzerland) Jenzer Motorsport	29

- Note: Only the top five positions are included for both sets of standings.

== Notes ==
Previous round: 2013 Catalunya GP3 Series round	GP3 Series; 2013 season	Next round: 2013 Silverstone GP3 Series round
Previous round: none	Ricardo Tormo GP3 round	Next round: none
