= 2013 Catalunya GP3 Series round =

Motor race in Montmeló, Spain

(Spain) 2013 Catalunya GP3 round
Round details
- Round 1 of 8 rounds in the 2013 GP3 Series
- Circuit de Catalunya
- Location: Circuit de Catalunya; Montmeló, Spain
- Course: Permanent racing facility 4.665 km (2.892 mi)

GP3 Series

Race 1
- Date: 11 May 2013
- Laps: 17

Pole position
Driver	(Cyprus) Tio Ellinas	Marussia Manor Racing
- Time: 1:34.233

Podium
First	(Cyprus) Tio Ellinas	Marussia Manor Racing
Second	(Switzerland) Patric Niederhauser	Jenzer Motorsport
Third	(United States) Conor Daly	Lotus GP

Fastest lap
Driver	(Cyprus) Tio Ellinas	Marussia Manor Racing
- Time: 1:36.800 (on lap 2)

Race 2
- Date: 12 May 2013
- Laps: 17

Podium
First	(Finland) Aaro Vainio	Koiranen GP
Second	(Estonia) Kevin Korjus	Koiranen GP
Third	(Switzerland) Patric Niederhauser	Jenzer Motorsport

Fastest lap
Driver	(Estonia) Kevin Korjus	Koiranen GP
- Time: 1:37.669 (on lap 4)

The 2013 Catalunya GP3 Series round was a GP3 Series motor race held at the Circuit de Catalunya in Montmeló, Spain on 11 and 12 May 2013 as the first round of the 2013 GP3 Series season. It was a support race for the 2013 Spanish Grand Prix. The race was the debut of the GP3 Series' second-generation chassis, the Dallara GP3/13. The sprint race was the 50th GP3 Series race.

== Classification ==
=== Summary ===
Kevin Korjus set the fastest time in qualifying. However, he was given a grid penalty for ignoring yellow flags in the practice session, and Tio Ellinas inherited pole position. Ellinas made a good start and held the lead for every lap. Some teams, in particular the MW Arden pair of Daniil Kvyat and Carlos Sainz Jr., struggled with high degradation on the new Pirelli tyres. Korjus and Dino Zamparelli collided with three laps to go, with Zamparelli retiring. Despite Patric Niederhauser challenging him for the final laps, Ellinas took the win for Marussia Manor Racing.

Korjus started on pole for the reverse grid sprint race. He was overtaken at the start by teammate Aaro Vainio, who had a better start than the three cars ahead of him. The safety car was called at the end of the first lap to recover the car of Melville McKee, who went into the gravel following a collision with Robert Vișoiu. Vainio won the race followed by Korjus, giving Koiranen GP a 1-2 finish in their first race weekend and the lead in the teams' championship. Nick Yelloly was running in third until lap 12, when he was spun by David Fumanelli; Hiederhauser finished third to take back-to-back podiums. Ellinas finished fourth, giving him an 11-point lead in the drivers' championship over Hiederhauser.

=== Qualifying ===
Pos.	No.	Driver	Team	Time	Grid
1	28	(Estonia) Kevin Korjus	Koiranen GP	1:34.193	10^{1}
2	14	(Cyprus) Tio Ellinas	Marussia Manor Racing	1:34.233	1
3	11	(Switzerland) Patric Niederhauser	Jenzer Motorsport	1:34.444	2
4	12	(Switzerland) Alex Fontana	Jenzer Motorsport	1:34.581	13^{2}
5	4	(Spain) Carlos Sainz Jr.	MW Arden	1:34.635	15^{2}
6	1	(United States) Conor Daly	ART Grand Prix	1:34.810	3
7	6	(Russia) Daniil Kvyat	MW Arden	1:34.989	7^{3}
8	8	(United Kingdom) Nick Yelloly	Carlin	1:35.111	4
9	27	(Finland) Aaro Vainio	Koiranen GP	1:35.183	5
10	2	(Argentina) Facu Regalia	ART Grand Prix	1:35.206	6
11	3	(United Kingdom) Jack Harvey	ART Grand Prix	1:35.250	8
12	16	(United Kingdom) Dino Zamparelli	Marussia Manor Racing	1:35.334	9
13	25	(Italy) David Fumanelli	Trident	1:35.376	11
14	5	(Romania) Robert Vișoiu	MW Arden	1:35.408	12
15	17	(Sweden) Jimmy Eriksson	Status Grand Prix	1:35.458	14
16	23	(Italy) Giovanni Venturini	Trident	1:35.533	16
17	20	(United Kingdom) Lewis Williamson	Bamboo Engineering	1:35.725	17
18	9	(Argentina) Eric Lichtenstein	Carlin	1:35.884	18
19	26	(Finland) Patrick Kujala	Koiranen GP	1:36.031	27^{2}
20	18	(Hong Kong) Adderly Fong	Status Grand Prix	1:36.131	19
21	7	(Macau) Luís Sá Silva	Carlin	1:36.271	20
22	21	(United Kingdom) Melville McKee	Bamboo Engineering	1:36.464	21
23	25	(San Marino) Emanuele Zonzini	Trident	1:36.489	22
24	10	(Venezuela) Samin Gómez	Jenzer Motorsport	1:36.543	23
25	15	(United Kingdom) Ryan Cullen	Marussia Manor Racing	1:37.004	24
26	19	(United Kingdom) Josh Webster	Status Grand Prix	1:37.030	25
27	22	(Spain) Carmen Jordá	Bamboo Engineering	1:38.574	26

Notes:

- ^1 — Kevin Korjus qualified on pole, but was given a ten-place grid penalty for ignoring yellow flags during free practice. Tio Ellinas was recognised as the pole-sitter for the event.
- ^2 — Alex Fontana, Carlos Sainz Jr. and Patrick Kujala all received ten-place grid penalties for ignoring yellow flags during free practice.
- ^3 — Daniil Kvyat was given a three-place penalty for blocking Conor Daly during qualifying. However, due to the order in which penalties were applied, he kept his seventh place on the grid.

=== Feature race ===
Pos.	No.	Driver	Team	Laps	Time/Retired	Grid	Points
1	14	(Cyprus) Tio Ellinas	Marussia Manor Racing	17	28:06.022	1	31 (25+4+2)
2	11	(Switzerland) Patric Niederhauser	Jenzer Motorsport	17	+0.428	2	18
3	1	(United States) Conor Daly	ART Grand Prix	17	+0.940	3	15
4	8	(United Kingdom) Nick Yelloly	Carlin	17	+9.726	4	12
5	27	(Finland) Aaro Vainio	Koiranen GP	17	+16.925	5	10
6	3	(United Kingdom) Jack Harvey	ART Grand Prix	17	+23.006	8	8
7	24	(Italy) David Fumanelli	Trident	17	+23.572	11	6
8	28	(Estonia) Kevin Korjus	Koiranen GP	17	+28.615	10	4
9	5	(Romania) Robert Vișoiu	MW Arden	17	+29.053	12	2
10	12	(Switzerland) Alex Fontana	Jenzer Motorsport	17	+29.426	13	1
11	20	(United Kingdom) Lewis Williamson	Bamboo Engineering	17	+29.669	17	
12	23	(Italy) Giovanni Venturini	Trident	17	+30.832	16	
13	7	(Macau) Luís Sá Silva	Carlin	17	+37.044	20	
14	21	(United Kingdom) Melville McKee	Bamboo Engineering	17	+37.277	21	
15	4	(Spain) Carlos Sainz Jr.	MW Arden	17	+51.699	15	
16	10	(Venezuela) Samin Gómez	Jenzer Motorsport	17	+51.949	23	
17	25	(San Marino) Emanuele Zonzini	Trident	17	+52.325	22	
18	9	(Argentina) Eric Lichtenstein	Carlin	17	+52.759	18	
19	17	(Sweden) Jimmy Eriksson	Status Grand Prix	17	+53.858	14	
20	6	(Russia) Daniil Kvyat	MW Arden	17	+1:08.961	7	
21	15	(United Kingdom) Ryan Cullen	Marussia Manor Racing	17	+1:09.967	24	
22	22	(Spain) Carmen Jordá	Bamboo Engineering	17	+1:10.828	26	
23	18	(Hong Kong) Adderly Fong	Status Grand Prix	17	+1:14.398	19	
24	2	(Argentina) Facu Regalia	ART Grand Prix	15	Retired^{4}	6	
Ret	16	(United Kingdom) Dino Zamparelli	Marussia Manor Racing	14	Retired	9	
Ret	26	(Finland) Patrick Kujala	Koiranen GP	10	Retired	27	
Ret	19	(United Kingdom) Josh Webster	Status Grand Prix	6	Retired	25	
Fastest lap: Tio Ellinas (Marussia Manor Racing) — 1:36.800 (on lap 2)

Notes:

- ^4 — Facu Regalia retired from the race, but was classified as a finisher as he had completed 90% of the winner's race distance.

=== Sprint race ===
Pos.	No.	Driver	Team	Laps	Time/Retired	Grid	Points
1	27	(Finland) Aaro Vainio	Koiranen GP	17	29:44.420	4	15
2	28	(Estonia) Kevin Korjus	Koiranen GP	17	+1.808	1	14 (12+2)
3	11	(Switzerland) Patric Niederhauser	Jenzer Motorsport	17	+6.948	7	10
4	14	(Cyprus) Tio Ellinas	Marussia Manor Racing	17	+14.048	8	8
5	1	(United States) Conor Daly	ART Grand Prix	17	+15.469	6	6
6	3	(United Kingdom) Jack Harvey	ART Grand Prix	17	+17.853	3	4
7	20	(United Kingdom) Lewis Williamson	Bamboo Engineering	17	+20.916	11	2
8	23	(Italy) Giovanni Venturini	Trident	17	+21.704	12	1
9	12	(Switzerland) Alex Fontana	Jenzer Motorsport	17	+22.088	10	
10	9	(Argentina) Eric Lichtenstein	Carlin	17	+22.355	18	
11	18	(Hong Kong) Adderly Fong	Status Grand Prix	17	+22.924	23	
12	7	(Macau) Luís Sá Silva	Carlin	17	+25.239	13	
13	10	(Venezuela) Samin Gómez	Jenzer Motorsport	17	+25.419	16	
14	2	(Argentina) Facu Regalia	ART Grand Prix	17	+25.968	24	
15	16	(United Kingdom) Dino Zamparelli	Marussia Manor Racing	17	+26.851	27^{1}	
16	26	(Finland) Patrick Kujala	Koiranen GP	17	+30.111	25	
17	24	(Italy) David Fumanelli	Trident	17	+15.234^{2}	2	
18	22	(Spain) Carmen Jordá	Bamboo Engineering	17	+45.568	22	
19	5	(Romania) Robert Vișoiu	MW Arden	17	+40.758^{2}	9	
Ret	19	(United Kingdom) Josh Webster	Status Grand Prix	14	Retired	26	
Ret	8	(United Kingdom) Nick Yelloly	Carlin	12	Retired	5	
Ret	25	(San Marino) Emanuele Zonzini	Trident	12	Retired	17	
Ret	17	(Sweden) Jimmy Eriksson	Status Grand Prix	10	Retired	19	
Ret	15	(United Kingdom) Ryan Cullen	Marussia Manor Racing	6	Retired	21	
Ret	6	(Russia) Daniil Kvyat	MW Arden	5	Retired	20	
Ret	21	(United Kingdom) Melville McKee	Bamboo Engineering	0	Retired	14	
DSQ	4	(Spain) Carlos Sainz Jr.	MW Arden International	17	Disqualified^{3}	15	
Fastest lap: Kevin Korjus (Koiranen GP) — 1:37.669 (on lap 4)

Notes:

- ^1 — Dino Zamparelli received a ten-place grid penalty for causing avoidable contact with Kevin Korjus in race 1.
- ^2 — David Fumanelli and Robert Vișoiu had twenty seconds added to their race time in lieu of a drive-through penalty after they were found to have caused avoidable accidents during the race.
- ^3 — Carlos Sainz Jr. was disqualified from the race after his car was found to be underweight during scrutineering.

== Standings after the round ==
Drivers' Championship standings

Pos.	Driver	Points
1	(Cyprus) Tio Ellinas	39
2	(Switzerland) Patric Niederhauser	28
3	(Finland) Aaro Vainio	25
4	(United States) Conor Daly	21
5	(Estonia) Kevin Korjus	18

Teams' Championship standings

Pos.	Team	Points
1	(Finland) Koiranen GP	43
2	(United Kingdom) Marussia Manor Racing	39
3	(France) ART Grand Prix	33
4	(Switzerland) Jenzer Motorsport	29
5	(United Kingdom) Carlin	12

- Note: Only the top five positions are included for both sets of standings.

== See also ==
- 2013 Spanish Grand Prix
- 2013 Catalunya GP2 Series round

Previous round: 2012 Monza GP3 Series round	GP3 Series; 2013 season	Next round: 2013 Ricardo Tormo GP3 Series round
Previous round: 2012 Catalunya GP3 Series round	Catalunya GP3 round	Next round: 2014 Catalunya GP3 Series round
