= 2013 Nürburgring GP3 Series round =

German Motor Race

(Germany) 2013 Nürburgring GP3 round
Round details
- Round 4 of 8 rounds in the 2013 GP3 Series
- Location: Nürburgring, Nürburg, Germany
- Course: Permanent racing facility 5.148 km (3.199 mi)

GP3 Series

Race 1
- Date: 6 July 2013
- Laps: 15

Pole position
Driver	(Argentina) Facu Regalia	ART Grand Prix
- Time: 1:44.170

Podium
First	(Argentina) Facu Regalia	ART Grand Prix
Second	(Cyprus) Tio Ellinas	Marussia Manor Racing
Third	(United Kingdom) Jack Harvey	ART Grand Prix

Fastest lap
Driver	(Argentina) Facu Regalia	ART Grand Prix
- Time: 1:46.712 (on lap 7)

Race 2
- Date: 7 July 2013
- Laps: 15

Podium
First	(United Kingdom) Melville McKee	Bamboo Engineering
Second	(United Kingdom) Alexander Sims	Status Grand Prix
Third	(United Kingdom) Nick Yelloly	Carlin

Fastest lap
Driver	(United Kingdom) Melville McKee	Bamboo Engineering
- Time: 1:46.938 (on lap 2)

The 2013 Nürburgring GP3 Series round was a GP3 Series motor race held on 6 and 7 July 2013 at Nürburgring, Germany. It was the fourth round of the 2013 GP3 Series. The race supported the 2013 German Grand Prix.

== Classification ==
=== Summary ===
Alexander Sims replaced Adderly Fong in the #18 Status Grand Prix car, as Fong was competing in another race in China.

Facu Regalia qualified on pole position. He made a strong start and led every lap, building a gap of seven seconds to Tio Ellinas behind to win the race. It was Regalia's maiden win in GP3, and the 20th win for ART Grand Prix. Ellinas and Jack Harvey rounded out the podium.

Sims started on pole for the reverse-grid race 2. Melville McKee took the lead at the start and held off Sims until the end of the race to take his first win and make it eight different winners in eight races. Nick Yelloly took third place. Ellinas extended his championship lead, 19 points ahead of Regalia.

=== Qualifying ===
Pos.	No.	Driver	Team	Time	Grid
1	2	(Argentina) Facu Regalia	ART Grand Prix	1:44.170	1
2	14	(Cyprus) Tio Ellinas	Marussia Manor Racing	1:44.224	2
3	12	(Switzerland) Alex Fontana	Jenzer Motorsport	1:44.482	3
4	3	(United Kingdom) Jack Harvey	ART Grand Prix	1:44.566	4
5	20	(United Kingdom) Lewis Williamson	Bamboo Engineering	1:44.602	5
6	8	(United Kingdom) Nick Yelloly	Carlin	1:44.619	6
7	18	(United Kingdom) Alexander Sims	Status Grand Prix	1:44.670	7
8	6	(Russia) Daniil Kvyat	MW Arden	1:44.675	8
9	28	(Estonia) Kevin Korjus	Koiranen GP	1:44.685	9
10	4	(Spain) Carlos Sainz Jr.	MW Arden	1:44.686	10
11	5	(Romania) Robert Vișoiu	MW Arden	1:44.881	11
12	9	(Argentina) Eric Lichtenstein	Carlin	1:44.945	15 ^{1}
13	21	(United Kingdom) Melville McKee	Bamboo Engineering	1:44.958	12
14	1	(United States) Conor Daly	ART Grand Prix	1:45.015	13
15	11	(Switzerland) Patric Niederhauser	Jenzer Motorsport	1:45.073	14
16	16	(United Kingdom) Dino Zamparelli	Marussia Manor Racing	1:45.151	16
17	27	(Finland) Aaro Vainio	Koiranen GP	1:45.204	17
18	23	(Italy) Giovanni Venturini	Trident	1:45.260	18
19	17	(Sweden) Jimmy Eriksson	Status Grand Prix	1:45.385	19
20	7	(Macau) Luís Sá Silva	Carlin	1:45.441	20
21	24	(Italy) David Fumanelli	Trident	1:45.469	21
22	26	(Finland) Patrick Kujala	Koiranen GP	1:45.515	22
23	25	(San Marino) Emanuele Zonzini	Trident	1:46.191	23
24	19	(United Kingdom) Josh Webster	Status Grand Prix	1:46.675	24
25	10	(Venezuela) Samin Gómez	Jenzer Motorsport	1:46.808	25
26	15	(United Kingdom) Ryan Cullen	Marussia Manor Racing	1:47.644	26
27	22	(Spain) Carmen Jordá	Bamboo Engineering	1:49.033	27

- ^1 Eric Lichtenstein was given a three-place grid penalty for impeding.

=== Feature Race ===
Pos.	No.	Driver	Team	Laps	Time/Retired	Grid	Points
1	2	(Argentina) Facu Regalia	ART Grand Prix	15	28:27.197	1	31 (25+4+2)
2	14	(Cyprus) Tio Ellinas	Marussia Manor Racing	15	+7.160	2	18
3	3	(United Kingdom) Jack Harvey	ART Grand Prix	15	+7.658	4	15
4	20	(United Kingdom) Lewis Williamson	Bamboo Engineering	15	+11.851	5	12
5	8	(United Kingdom) Nick Yelloly	Carlin	15	+12.586	6	10
6	4	(Spain) Carlos Sainz Jr.	MW Arden	15	+16.503	10	8
7	21	(United Kingdom) Melville McKee	Bamboo Engineering	15	+17.495	12	6
8	18	(United Kingdom) Alexander Sims	Status Grand Prix	15	+18.449	7	4
9	16	(United Kingdom) Dino Zamparelli	Marussia Manor Racing	15	+19.481	16	2
10	1	(United States) Conor Daly	ART Grand Prix	15	+19.886	13	1
11	5	(Romania) Robert Vișoiu	MW Arden	15	+21.799	11	
12	11	(Switzerland) Patric Niederhauser	Jenzer Motorsport	15	+22.381	14	
13	26	(Finland) Patrick Kujala	Koiranen GP	15	+28.568	22	
14	27	(Finland) Aaro Vainio	Koiranen GP	15	+31.250	17	
15	25	(San Marino) Emanuele Zonzini	Trident	15	+31.919	23	
16	23	(Italy) Giovanni Venturini	Trident	15	+33.262	18	
17	24	(Italy) David Fumanelli	Trident	15	+33.630	21	
18	10	(Venezuela) Samin Gómez	Jenzer Motorsport	15	+35.102	25	
19	15	(United Kingdom) Ryan Cullen	Marussia Manor Racing	15	+36.914	26	
20	28	(Estonia) Kevin Korjus	Koiranen GP	14	+1 lap	9	
Ret	22	(Spain) Carmen Jordá	Bamboo Engineering	10	Retired	27	
Ret	12	(Switzerland) Alex Fontana	Jenzer Motorsport	2	Retired	3	
Ret	17	(Sweden) Jimmy Eriksson	Status Grand Prix	1	Retired	19	
Ret	19	(United Kingdom) Josh Webster	Status Grand Prix	1	Retired	24	
Ret	7	(Macau) Luís Sá Silva	Carlin	0	Retired	20	
Ret	9	(Argentina) Eric Lichtenstein	Carlin	0	Retired	15	
Ret	6	(Russia) Daniil Kvyat	MW Arden	0	Retired	8	
Fastest lap: Facu Regalia (ART Grand Prix) — 1:46.712 (on lap 7)

=== Sprint Race ===
Pos.	No.	Driver	Team	Laps	Time/Retired	Grid	Points
1	21	(United Kingdom) Melville McKee	Bamboo Engineering	15	27:23.992	2	17 (15+2)
2	18	(United Kingdom) Alexander Sims	Status Grand Prix	15	+0.353	1	12
3	8	(United Kingdom) Nick Yelloly	Carlin	15	+3.506	4	10
4	20	(United Kingdom) Lewis Williamson	Bamboo Engineering	15	+5.273	5	8
5	4	(Spain) Carlos Sainz Jr.	MW Arden	15	+9.781	3	6
6	14	(Cyprus) Tio Ellinas	Marussia Manor Racing	15	+12.686	7	4
7	16	(United Kingdom) Dino Zamparelli	Marussia Manor Racing	15	+15.302	9	2
8	11	(Switzerland) Patric Niederhauser	Jenzer Motorsport	15	+16.023	12	1
9	1	(United States) Conor Daly	ART Grand Prix	15	+17.176	10	
10	3	(United Kingdom) Jack Harvey	ART Grand Prix	15	+19.390	6	
11	27	(Finland) Aaro Vainio	Koiranen GP	15	+24.437	14	
12	25	(San Marino) Emanuele Zonzini	Trident	15	+26.696	15	
13	26	(Finland) Patrick Kujala	Koiranen GP	15	+28.519	13	
14	23	(Italy) Giovanni Venturini	Trident	15	+30.269	16	
15	28	(Estonia) Kevin Korjus	Koiranen GP	15	+30.613	20	
16	6	(Russia) Daniil Kvyat	MW Arden	15	+30.818	26	
17	12	(Switzerland) Alex Fontana	Jenzer Motorsport	15	+31.247	22	
18	17	(Sweden) Jimmy Eriksson	Status Grand Prix	15	+33.008	24	
19	10	(Venezuela) Samin Gómez	Jenzer Motorsport	15	+34.547	18	
20	24	(Italy) David Fumanelli	Trident	15	+34.698	17	
21	9	(Argentina) Eric Lichtenstein	Carlin	15	+35.383	25	
22	7	(Macau) Luís Sá Silva	Carlin	15	+38.946	27 ^{1}	
23	5	(Romania) Robert Vișoiu	MW Arden	15	+39.132	11	
24	22	(Spain) Carmen Jordá	Bamboo Engineering	15	+1:02.686	21	
25	15	(United Kingdom) Ryan Cullen	Marussia Manor Racing	15	+1:22.545	19	
DNF	19	(United Kingdom) Josh Webster	Status Grand Prix	11	Retired	23	
DNF	2	(Argentina) Facu Regalia	ART Grand Prix	8	Retired	8	
Fastest lap: Melville McKee (Bamboo Engineering) — 1:46.938 (on lap 2)

- ^1 Luís Sá Silva was given a ten-place grid penalty for causing a collision in race 1.

== Standings after the round ==
Drivers' Championship standings

	Pos.	Driver	Points
	1	(Cyprus) Tio Ellinas	91
4	2	(Argentina) Facu Regalia	72
1	3	(Estonia) Kevin Korjus	59
1	4	(United Kingdom) Jack Harvey	57
2	5	(United States) Conor Daly	52

Teams' Championship standings

Pos.	Team	Points
1	(France) ART Grand Prix	181
2	(Finland) Koiranen GP	103
3	(Australia) MW Arden	99
4	(United Kingdom) Marussia Manor Racing	98
5	(United Kingdom) Carlin	52

- Note: Only the top five positions are included for both sets of standings.

== See also ==
- 2013 German Grand Prix
- 2013 Nürburgring GP2 Series round

Previous round: 2013 Silverstone GP3 Series round	GP3 Series; 2013 season	Next round: 2013 Hungaroring GP3 Series round
Previous round: 2012 Hockenheimring GP3 Series round	German GP3 round	Next round: 2014 Hockenheimring GP3 Series round
