= 2013 Silverstone GP3 Series round =

(United Kingdom) 2013 Silverstone GP3 round
Round details
- Round 3 of 8 rounds in the 2013 GP3 Series
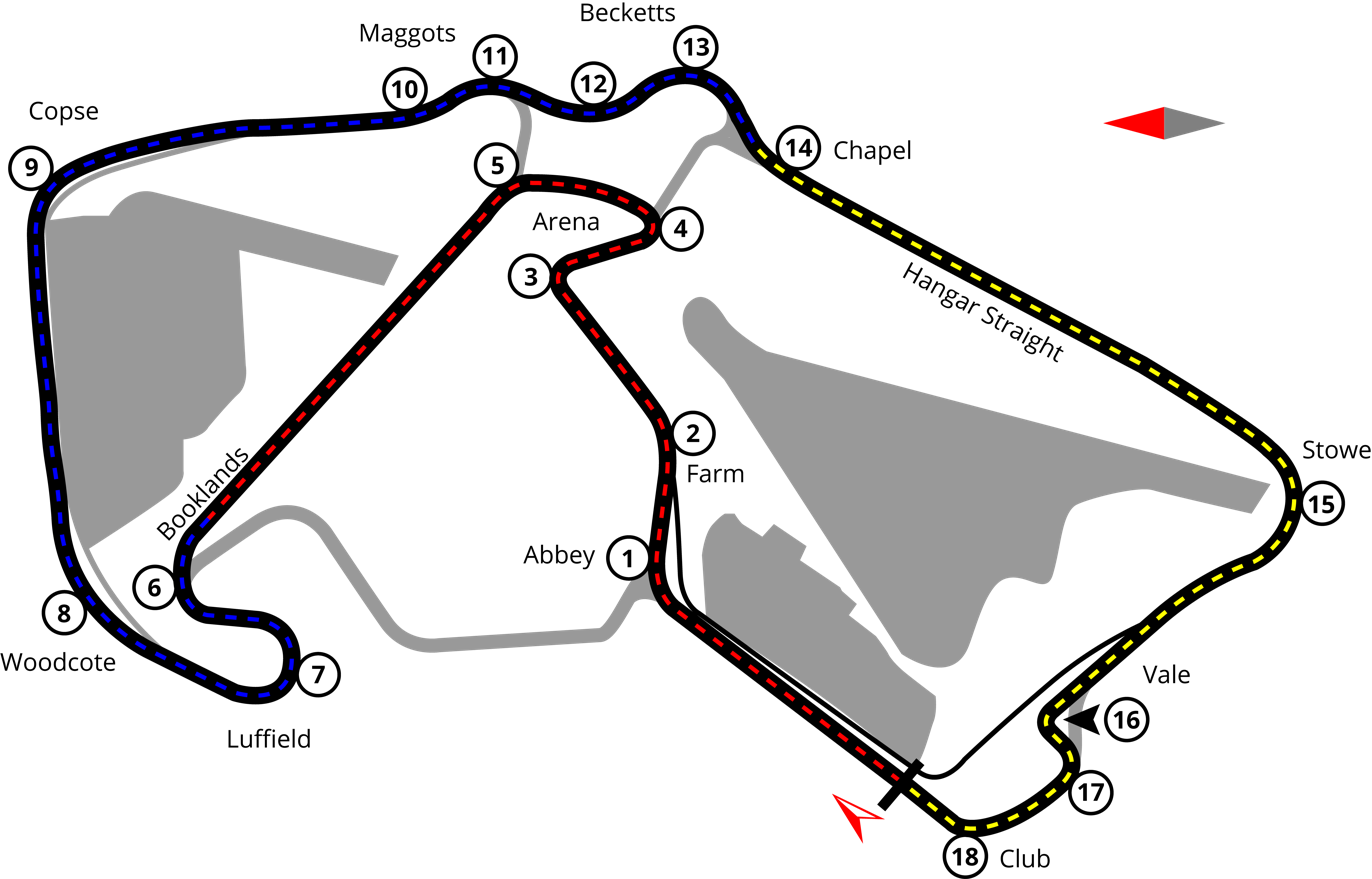
- Silverstone
- Location: Silverstone Circuit; Silverstone, United Kingdom
- Course: Permanent racing facility 5.901 km (3.667 mi)

GP3 Series

Race 1
- Date: 29 June 2013
- Laps: 15

Pole position
Driver	(Estonia) Kevin Korjus	Koiranen GP
- Time: 1:46.360

Podium
First	(United Kingdom) Jack Harvey	ART Grand Prix
Second	(Estonia) Kevin Korjus	Koiranen GP
Third	(Argentina) Facu Regalia	ART Grand Prix

Fastest lap
Driver	(United Kingdom) Jack Harvey	ART Grand Prix
- Time: 1:48.743 (on lap 13)

Race 2
- Date: 30 June 2013
- Laps: 15

Podium
First	(Italy) Giovanni Venturini	Trident
Second	(United Kingdom) Nick Yelloly	Carlin
Third	(Switzerland) Alex Fontana	Jenzer Motorsport

Fastest lap
Driver	(Russia) Daniil Kvyat	MW Arden
- Time: 1:49.112 (on lap 15)

The 2013 Silverstone GP3 Series round was a GP3 Series motor race held on 29 and 30 June 2013 at Silverstone Circuit in Silverstone, United Kingdom. It was the third round of the 2013 GP3 Season. The race supported the 2013 British Grand Prix.

== Classification ==
=== Summary ===
Kevin Korjus set the fastest time in qualifying. He was overtaken at the start by Jack Harvey, who then led every lap to win the race. A significant portion of the race took part under safety car conditions following a collision between Patrick Kujala and David Fumanelli, where Kujala was launched over Fumanelli's car ad landed upside down on a tyre barrier. Third place went to Facu Regalia after Conor Daly, who had moved from ninth to second on the opening lap, was given a drive through for a false start.

Giovanni Venturini started on pole position for the reverse grid sprint race. Nick Yelloly attempted to overtake Venturini at the start of the race, but ran wide at the exit of Village, giving Venturini back the lead. They fought closely throughout the race, but in the end, it was Venturini who won, a first victory in GP3 for him and for Trident. Tio Ellinas remained in the lead of the drivers' championship, ten points ahead of Korjus, with ART Grand Prix leading the teams' championship.

=== Qualifying ===
Pos.	No.	Driver	Team	Time	Grid
1	28	(Estonia) Kevin Korjus	Koiranen GP	1:46.360	1
2	3	(United Kingdom) Jack Harvey	ART Grand Prix	1:46.415	2
3	2	(Argentina) Facu Regalia	ART Grand Prix	1:46.581	3
4	12	(Switzerland) Alex Fontana	Jenzer Motorsport	1:46.631	4
5	4	(Spain) Carlos Sainz Jr.	MW Arden	1:46.649	5
6	14	(Cyprus) Tio Ellinas	Marussia Manor Racing	1:46.693	6
7	6	(Russia) Daniil Kvyat	MW Arden	1:46.708	7
8	8	(United Kingdom) Nick Yelloly	Carlin	1:46.873	8
9	1	(United States) Conor Daly	ART Grand Prix	1:46.874	9
10	11	(Switzerland) Patric Niederhauser	Jenzer Motorsport	1:47.126	10
11	27	(Finland) Aaro Vainio	Koiranen GP	1:47.223	11
12	18	(Hong Kong) Adderly Fong	Status Grand Prix	1:47.296	12
13	23	(Italy) Giovanni Venturini	Trident	1:47.304	13
14	5	(Romania) Robert Vișoiu	MW Arden	1:47.376	14
15	26	(Finland) Patrick Kujala	Koiranen GP	1:47.458	15
16	16	(United Kingdom) Dino Zamparelli	Marussia Manor Racing	1:47.724	16
17	25	(Italy) David Fumanelli	Trident	1:47.725	17
18	21	(United Kingdom) Melville McKee	Bamboo Engineering	1:47.787	18
19	20	(United Kingdom) Lewis Williamson	Bamboo Engineering	1:47.864	19
20	7	(Macau) Luís Sá Silva	Carlin	1:47.987	20
21	19	(United Kingdom) Josh Webster	Status Grand Prix	1:48.061	21
22	9	(Argentina) Eric Lichtenstein	Carlin	1:48.127	22
23	17	(Sweden) Jimmy Eriksson	Status Grand Prix	1:48.394	23
24	25	(San Marino) Emanuele Zonzini	Trident	1:48.691	24
25	10	(Venezuela) Samin Gómez	Jenzer Motorsport	1:49.916	25
26	15	(United Kingdom) Ryan Cullen	Marussia Manor Racing	1:50.561	26
27	22	(Spain) Carmen Jordá	Bamboo Engineering	1:52.019	27

=== Feature Race ===
Pos.	No.	Driver	Team	Laps	Time/Retired	Grid	Points
1	3	(United Kingdom) Jack Harvey	ART Grand Prix	15	31:37.496	2	27 (25+2)
2	28	(Estonia) Kevin Korjus	Koiranen GP	15	+3:051	1	22 (18+4)
3	2	(Argentina) Facu Regalia	ART Grand Prix	15	+5.369	3	15
4	6	(Russia) Daniil Kvyat	MW Arden	15	+6.619	7	12
5	14	(Cyprus) Tio Ellinas	Marussia Manor Racing	15	+8.073	6	10
6	8	(United Kingdom) Nick Yelloly	Carlin	15	+9.485	8	8
7	12	(Switzerland) Alex Fontana	Jenzer Motorsport	15	+12.309	4	6
8	23	(Italy) Giovanni Venturini	Trident	15	+15.626	13	4
9	18	(Hong Kong) Adderly Fong	Status Grand Prix	15	+16.634	12	2
10	16	(United Kingdom) Dino Zamparelli	Marussia Manor Racing	15	+17.210	16	1
11	27	(Finland) Aaro Vainio	Koiranen GP	15	+18.126	11	
12	5	(Romania) Robert Vișoiu	MW Arden	15	+19.191	14	
13	4	(Spain) Carlos Sainz Jr.	MW Arden	15	+20.132	5	
14	9	(Argentina) Eric Lichtenstein	Carlin	15	+20.350	22	
15	11	(Switzerland) Patric Niederhauser	Jenzer Motorsport	15	+20.610	10	
16	19	(United Kingdom) Josh Webster	Status Grand Prix	15	+21.885	21	
17	7	(Macau) Luís Sá Silva	Carlin	15	+22.233	20	
18	17	(Sweden) Jimmy Eriksson	Status Grand Prix	15	+23.193	23	
19	25	(San Marino) Emanuele Zonzini	Trident	15	+23.808	24	
20	10	(Venezuela) Samin Gómez	Jenzer Motorsport	15	+28.118	25	
21	15	(United Kingdom) Ryan Cullen	Marussia Manor Racing	15	+28.756	26	
22	1	(United States) Conor Daly	ART Grand Prix	15	+30.390	9	
23	22	(Spain) Carmen Jordá	Bamboo Engineering	15	+39.008	27	
24	21	(United Kingdom) Melville McKee	Bamboo Engineering	15	+1:04.844 ^{1}	18	
25	20	(United Kingdom) Lewis Williamson	Bamboo Engineering	13	+2 laps	19	
Ret	26	(Finland) Patrick Kujala	Koiranen GP	4	Retired	15	
Ret	24	(Italy) David Fumanelli	Trident	4	Retired	17	
Fastest lap: Jack Harvey (ART Grand Prix) — 1:48.743 (on lap 13)

- ^1 Melville McKee was given a drive-through converted to a 20-second time penalty for a jump start.

=== Sprint Race ===
Pos.	No.	Driver	Team	Laps	Time/Retired	Grid	Points
1	23	(Italy) Giovanni Venturini	Trident	15	27:32.438	1	15
2	8	(United Kingdom) Nick Yelloly	Carlin	15	+0.609	3	12
3	12	(Switzerland) Alex Fontana	Jenzer Motorsport	15	+1.519	2	10
4	6	(Russia) Daniil Kvyat	MW Arden	15	+2.732	5	10 (8+2)
5	2	(Argentina) Facu Regalia	ART Grand Prix	15	+4.673	6	6
6	14	(Cyprus) Tio Ellinas	Marussia Manor Racing	15	+5.376	4	4
7	3	(United Kingdom) Jack Harvey	ART Grand Prix	15	+6.657	8	2
8	27	(Finland) Aaro Vainio	Koiranen GP	15	+8.145	11	1
9	28	(Estonia) Kevin Korjus	Koiranen GP	15	+9.008	7	
10	9	(Argentina) Eric Lichtenstein	Carlin	15	+10.311	13	
11	11	(Switzerland) Patric Niederhauser	Jenzer Motorsport	15	+11.242	14	
12	7	(Macau) Luís Sá Silva	Carlin	15	+11.985	16	
13	4	(Spain) Carlos Sainz Jr.	MW Arden	15	+13.611	23 ^{1}	
14	20	(United Kingdom) Lewis Williamson	Bamboo Engineering	15	+14.183	25	
15	21	(United Kingdom) Melville McKee	Bamboo Engineering	15	+15.872	24	
16	19	(United Kingdom) Josh Webster	Status Grand Prix	15	+29.082	15	
17	15	(United Kingdom) Ryan Cullen	Marussia Manor Racing	15	+38.395	20	
18	10	(Venezuela) Samin Gómez	Jenzer Motorsport	15	+38.786	19	
19	22	(Spain) Carmen Jordá	Bamboo Engineering	15	+1:01.165	22	
20	24	(Italy) David Fumanelli	Trident	15	+1:01.433	26	
21	17	(Sweden) Jimmy Eriksson	Status Grand Prix	13	Retired ^{2}	17	
DNF	5	(Romania) Robert Vișoiu	MW Arden	1	Retired	12	
DNF	16	(United Kingdom) Dino Zamparelli	Marussia Manor Racing	0	Retired	10	
DNF	1	(United States) Conor Daly	ART Grand Prix	0	Retired	21	
DNF	25	(San Marino) Emanuele Zonzini	Trident	0	Retired	18	
DNF	18	(Hong Kong) Adderly Fong	Status Grand Prix	0	Retired	9	
EX	26	(Finland) Patrick Kujala	Koiranen GP	0	Excluded ^{3}	EX	
Fastest lap: Daniil Kvyat (MW Arden) — 1:49.112 (on lap 15)

- ^1 Carlos Sainz Jr. was given a 10-place grid penalty for forcing another driver off the track in race 1.
- ^2 Jimmy Eriksson did not finish the race, but was classified as he finished more than 90% of the race distance.
- ^3 Patrick Kujala was excluded from race 2 after causing a collision in race 1.

== Standings after the round ==
Drivers' Championship standings

	Pos.	Driver	Points
	1	(Cyprus) Tio Ellinas	69
2	2	(Estonia) Kevin Korjus	59
1	3	(United States) Conor Daly	51
1	4	(Finland) Aaro Vainio	44
5	5	(United Kingdom) Jack Harvey	42

Teams' Championship standings

Pos.	Team	Points
1	(France) ART Grand Prix	134
2	(Finland) Koiranen GP	103
3	(Australia) MW Arden	85
4	(United Kingdom) Marussia Manor Racing	72
5	(Switzerland) Jenzer Motorsport	45

- Note: Only the top five positions are included for both sets of standings.

== See also ==
- 2013 British Grand Prix
- 2013 Silverstone GP2 Series round

Previous round: 2013 Ricardo Tormo GP3 Series round	GP3 Series; 2013 season	Next round: 2013 Nürburgring GP3 Series round
Previous round: 2012 Silverstone GP3 Series round	Silverstone GP3 round	Next round: 2014 Silverstone GP3 Series round
