= Arthur Pic =

French racing driver

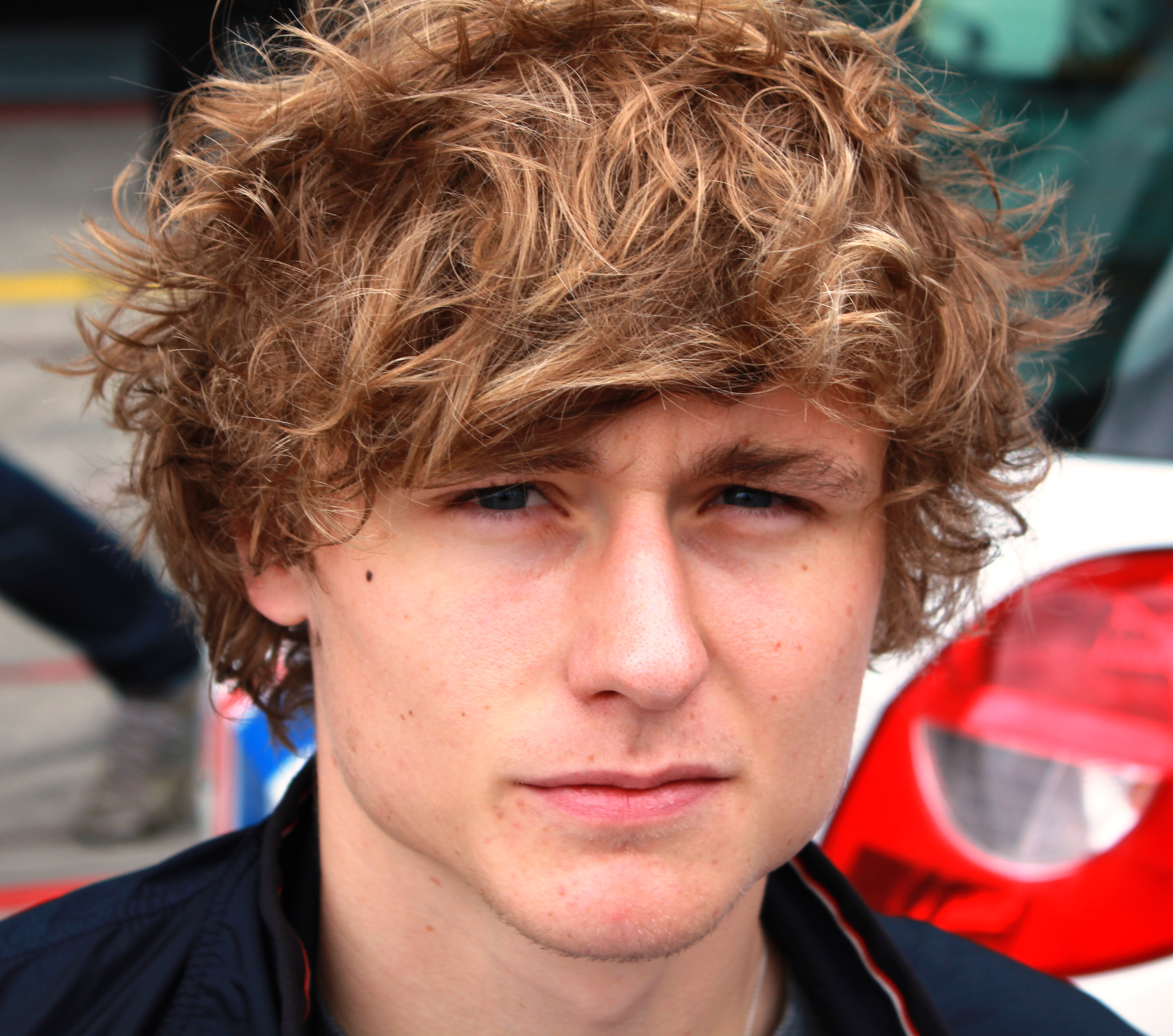
- Pic in 2012
- Nationality: (France) French
- Born: Arthur Pierre Louis Pic; 5 October 1991 (age 35) Montélimar, France
- Relatives: Charles Pic (brother)

GP2 Series career
- Debut season: 2014
- Current team: Rapax
- Categorisation: FIA Gold
- Car number: 12
- Former teams: Campos Racing
- Starts: 61
- Championships: 0
- Wins: 1
- Podiums: 6
- Poles: 0
- Fastest laps: 1
- Best finish: 7th in 2014

Previous series
- 2009–2010 2009 2008 2007: Eurocup Formula Renault 2.0; Formula Renault 2.0 WEC; Formul'Academy Euro Series; Formula Renault 1.6 Belgium

Championship titles
- 2008: Formul'Academy Euro Series

Arthur Pierre Louis Pic (born 5 October 1991) is a French former racing driver who competed in the GP2 Series from 2014 to 2016.

== Career ==
=== Karting ===
Like many racing drivers, Pic began his career in karting, competing in the 2005 French Junior Championship while also finishing third in the Bridgestone Cup and runner-up in Spain's Champions Cup at El Vendrell. The following season, he finished fourth in the French Championship before turning his attention to single-seater competition.

=== Formula Renault 2.0 Series (2009–2010) ===
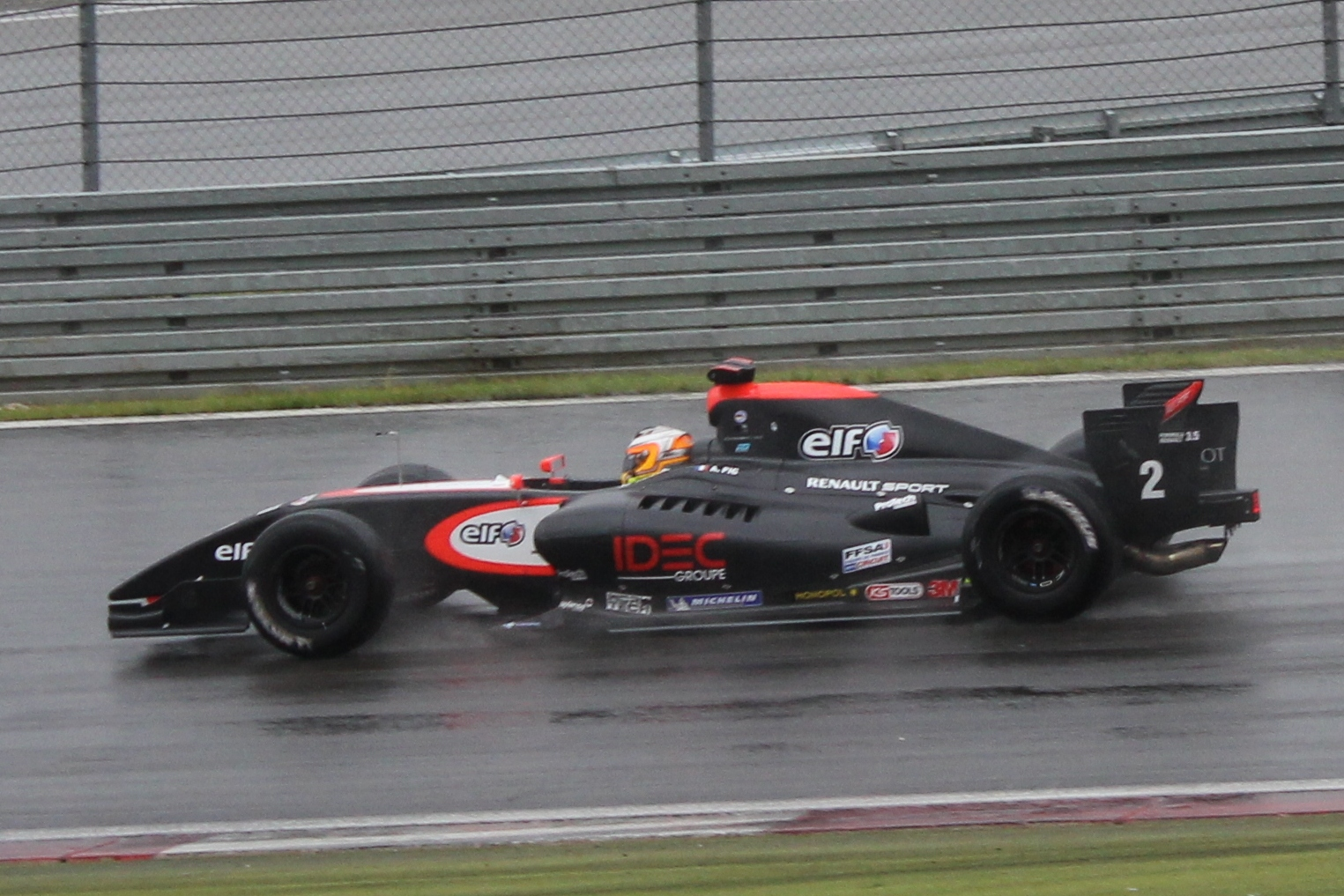
Arthur Pic at the 2011 Nürburgring World series by Renault round

In 2007, 15-year-old Pic began his move to single-seater racing by running a limited schedule in the Formula Renault 1.6 Belgium series. The following year, he stepped up to new-for-2008 Formul'Academy Euro Series which he won comfortably at the first attempt, taking nine podium finishes from fourteen races.

Next, Pic competed in both the Eurocup Formula Renault 2.0 and Formula Renault 2.0 West European Cup championships for SG Formula. He finished tenth in the ultra-competitive Eurocup series, taking nine points-scoring positions in 14 races, and sixth place in the West European Cup where he managed two podium finishes and ended the campaign as the highest placed rookie driver.

Remaining in the Eurocup for the 2010 season, Pic switched to Tech 1 Racing. and scored seven pole positions, four fastest laps and four race wins on his way to third in the standings.

=== Formula Renault 3.5 Series (2011–2013) ===
It was announced on 3 January 2011 that Pic would drive for Tech 1 Racing in the Formula Renault 3.5 Series alongside Kevin Korjus. After a learning year in which he showed flashes of genuine pace and recorded 12 championship points, he switched to the DAMS squad for 2012 to lead the team's first Formula Renault 3.5 campaign. He immediately proved rapid, taking pole position for the opening two races and scoring enough points to remain among the championship contenders at half-distance. He recorded his first race victory in the championship's trip to Russia, emerging from the weekend as the highest scoring driver with a total of 37 points. A difficult end to the year proved to be his undoing and ultimately left him eighth in the final standings.

Pic remained in the championship for a third year in 2013, joining the new Spanish squad AV Formula. Despite struggling in qualifying for the opening round at Monza, he completed a combined 28 overtaking moves during both races to finish sixth and fourth respectively. He then scored the team's first podium finish in only its second weekend of FR3.5 competition, coming home third at Motorland Aragon. He had a total of nine points-paying finishes over the course of the 2013 season to conclude it eighth in the standings.

=== MRF Challenge (2013) ===
During the 2013 off-season, Pic competed in the MRF Challenge championship with backing from Renault. He took a commanding victory at the opening race, which ran in support of the Indian Grand Prix, and won again at the following event in Bahrain. In total, he had seven podium finishes over the course of three weekends.

=== GP2 Series (2014–2016) ===
In January 2014, it was confirmed that Pic would drive for the Campos Racing team in the following GP2 Series season. He took his first podium and GP2 win in the feature race at the Hungaroring with two more podiums at Monza and Yas Marina. He remained with Campos for the 2015 season, finishing 11th, four places from where he finished in 2014. He switched to the Rapax Team for the 2016 season.

== Personal life ==
Pic is the younger brother of the racing driver Charles Pic, who has competed in Formula One with the Caterham and Marussia teams.

Since April 2017, he has held the position of Deputy Director for the South-East region of the transport and logistics company GCA (Groupe Charles André).

== Karting record ==
=== Karting career summary ===
Season	Series	Position
2005	French Junior Championship	3rd
2005	Bridgestone Cup	3rd
2005	Spanish Champions Cup	2nd
2006	French Karting Championship	4th

== Racing record ==
=== Career summary ===
Season	Series	Team	Races	Wins	Poles	F/Laps	Podiums	Points	Position
2007	Formula Renault 1.6 Belgium	Thierry Boutsen Racing	4	0	0	0	0	0	NC
2008	Formul’Academy Euro Series	Auto Sport Academy	14	6	6	6	9	146.5	**1st**
2009	Formula Renault 2.0 Eurocup	SG Formula	14	0	0	0	0	27	10th
2009	Formula Renault 2.0 WEC	SG Formula	13	0	1	1	2	63	6th
2010	Eurocup Formula Renault 2.0	Tech 1 Racing	16	4	7	4	8	127	**3rd**
2010	Formula Renault UK	Tech 1 Racing	2	0	0	0	0	15	24th
2011	Formula Renault 3.5 Series	Tech 1 Racing	17	0	0	0	0	12	23rd
2012	Formula Renault 3.5 Series	DAMS	17	1	2	2	2	102	8th
2013	Formula Renault 3.5 Series	AV Formula	17	0	0	1	1	74	8th
2013-14	MRF Challenge Formula 2000 Championship	MRF Racing	9	2	1	4	7	134	**3rd**
2014	GP2 Series	Campos Racing	22	1	0	1	3	124	7th
2014	European Le Mans Series – LMP2	Sébastien Loeb Racing	1	0	0	0	0	8	23rd
2015	GP2 Series	Campos Racing	22	0	0	0	2	60	11th
2016	GP2 Series	Rapax	18	0	0	0	1	36	14th

=== Complete Eurocup Formula Renault 2.0 results ===
(key) (Races in bold indicate pole position; races in italics indicate fastest lap)

Year	Entrant	1	2	3	4	5	6	7	8	9	10	11	12	13	14	15	16	DC	Points
2009	SG Formula	CAT; 1; 20	CAT; 2; 7	SPA; 1; 10	SPA; 2; 9	HUN; 1; 12	HUN; 2; 14	SIL; 1; 7	SIL; 2; 4	LMS; 1; 4	LMS; 2 Ret	NÜR; 1; 13	NÜR; 2 Ret	ALC; 1; 13	ALC; 2; 14			10th	27
2010	Tech 1 Racing	ALC; 1; 14	**ALC**; **2** Ret	**SPA**; **1**; 1	**SPA**; **2** DNS	**BRN**; **1**; 1	**BRN**; **2**; 1	**MAG**; **1**; 2	**MAG**; **2**; 6	HUN; 1; 1	HUN; 2; 2	HOC; 1; 3	HOC; 2; 3	SIL; 1; 7	SIL; 2; 8	CAT; 1; 11	CAT; 2 DSQ	3rd	123

=== Complete Formula Renault 3.5 Series results ===
(key) (Races in bold indicate pole position) (Races in italics indicate fastest lap)

Year	Team	1	2	3	4	5	6	7	8	9	10	11	12	13	14	15	16	17	Pos	Points
2011	Tech 1 Racing	ALC; 1 Ret	ALC; 2; 14	SPA; 1; 16	SPA; 2; 12	MNZ; 1 Ret	MNZ; 2; 9	MON; 1; 6	NÜR; 1; 20	NÜR; 2; 14	HUN; 1; 19	HUN; 2; 11	SIL; 1; 16	SIL; 2; 21	LEC; 1; 19	LEC; 2 Ret	CAT; 1; 10	CAT; 2; 10	23rd	12
2012	DAMS	**ALC**; **1** Ret	**ALC**; **2**; 3	MON; 1; 11	SPA; 1; 15	SPA; 2 Ret	NÜR; 1; 4	NÜR; 2 Ret	MSC; 1; 4	MSC; 2; 1	SIL; 1 Ret	SIL; 2; 4	HUN; 1; 5	HUN; 2; 6	LEC; 1 Ret	LEC; 2; 14	CAT; 1; 11	CAT; 2; 6	8th	102
2013	AV Formula	MNZ; 1; 6	MNZ; 2; 4	ALC; 1; 3	ALC; 2 Ret	MON; 1; 10	SPA; 1; 4	SPA; 2 Ret	MSC; 1; 12	MSC; 2; 16	RBR; 1; 5	RBR; 2; 20	HUN; 1; 9	HUN; 2 Ret	LEC; 1; 6	LEC; 2; 7	CAT; 1 Ret	CAT; 2 Ret	8th	74

=== Complete GP2 Series results ===
(key) (Races in bold indicate pole position) (Races in italics indicate fastest lap)

Year	Entrant	1	2	3	4	5	6	7	8	9	10	11	12	13	14	15	16	17	18	19	20	21	22	DC	Points
2014	Campos Racing	BHR; FEA; 5	BHR; SPR; 9	CAT; FEA; 6	CAT; SPR; 4	MON; FEA; 6	MON; SPR; 5	RBR; FEA; 10	RBR; SPR; 13	SIL; FEA; 11	SIL; SPR; 22†	HOC; FEA; 19	HOC; SPR; Ret	HUN; FEA; 1	HUN; SPR; 6	SPA; FEA; 15	SPA; SPR; 20	MNZ; FEA; 2	MNZ; SPR; 7	SOC; FEA; 4	SOC; SPR; 5	YMC; FEA; 8	YMC; SPR; 3	7th	124
2015	Campos Racing	BHR; FEA; Ret	BHR; SPR; 10	CAT; FEA; 9	CAT; SPR; 8	MON; FEA; 4	MON; SPR; 6	RBR; FEA; 9	RBR; SPR; 11	SIL; FEA; 14	SIL; SPR; 16	HUN; FEA; 13	HUN; SPR; 10	SPA; FEA; 2	SPA; SPR; Ret	MNZ; FEA; 7	MNZ; SPR; 2	SOC; FEA; 8	SOC; SPR; 13	BHR; FEA; 10	BHR; SPR; 16	YMC; FEA; 17	YMC; SPR; C	11th	60
2016	Rapax	CAT; FEA; 13	CAT; SPR; Ret	MON; FEA; 10	MON; SPR; 9	BAK; FEA; Ret	BAK; SPR; 8	RBR; FEA; 9	RBR; SPR; 18	SIL; FEA; 14	SIL; SPR; 11	HUN; FEA; 5	HUN; SPR; Ret	HOC; FEA; 4	HOC; SPR; 3	SPA; FEA; 14	SPA; SPR; 22†	MNZ; FEA; Ret	MNZ; SPR; 11	SEP; FEA	SEP; SPR	YMC; FEA	YMC; SPR	14th	36

^{†} Driver did not finish the race, but was classified as he completed over 90% of the race distance.

Sporting positions
Preceded by Jean-Éric Vergne	Formul'Academy Euro Series; Champion; 2008	Succeeded by Benjamin Bailly
