= 2010 Eurocup Formula Renault 2.0 =

Motor racing competition

Seasons
- ← 2009 2011 →

The 2010 Eurocup Formula Renault 2.0 season was the 20th Eurocup Formula Renault 2.0 season. It began on 17 April at Motorland Aragon and ended on 10 October at Circuit de Catalunya after eight rounds and sixteen races.

The series had a new look for 2010, with the introduction of the Barazi-Epsilon chassis to replace the original Tatuus chassis which had been the mainstay of Formula Renault 2.0 during the 2000s. Both season-opening races at Motorland Aragón were won by Eurocup debutant Kevin Korjus, who had moved up from the Formula Renault 2.0 Northern European Cup over the off-season. It was the start of a dominating season for the teenager from Estonia, adding seven more victories over the season to become the series' youngest champion, at the age of 17 years, 253 days. It was not until the final race before the runner-up placing was decided. Tech 1 Racing's Arthur Pic held a five-point advantage over Interwetten Junior Team driver Luciano Bacheta before the final race, but was decided in Bacheta's favour after Pic was disqualified for failing to observe a drive-through penalty for short-cutting a chicane while attempting to pass team-mate Carlos Sainz Jr. who was competing as a guest. The trio claimed 14 of the 16 race wins on offer, with the other wins going to fifth-placed Giovanni Venturini and Javier Tarancón, both driving for Epsilon Euskadi.

== Teams and drivers ==
- Guest entries are listed in italics.

Team	No.	Driver name	Class	Rounds
(Spain) Epsilon Euskadi	1	(Spain) Genís Olivé	J	1–6, 8
(Spain) Epsilon Euskadi	1	(Spain) Carlos Sainz Jr.		7
(Spain) Epsilon Euskadi	2	(Spain) Miguel Otegui	J	1–5
(Spain) Epsilon Euskadi	2	(Spain) Javier Tarancón		6–8
(Spain) Epsilon Euskadi	3	(Italy) Giovanni Venturini		All
(Spain) Epsilon Euskadi	4	(Spain) Alex Riberas	J	All
(France) Tech 1 Racing	5	(France) Arthur Pic		All
(France) Tech 1 Racing	6	(France) Hugo Valente	J	All
(France) Tech 1 Racing	7	(Finland) Aaro Vainio	J	All
(France) Tech 1 Racing	66	(Spain) Carlos Sainz Jr.	J	8
(Netherlands) MP Motorsport	9	(Estonia) Karl-Oscar Liiv	J	1–2, 5–8
(Netherlands) MP Motorsport	10	(Netherlands) Daniël de Jong	J	All
(Netherlands) MP Motorsport	30	(Finland) Kalle Kulmanen	J	All
(Czech Republic) Krenek Motorsport	11	(Czech Republic) Adam Kout		2–5
(Czech Republic) Krenek Motorsport	11	(Slovakia) Richard Gonda		7
(Czech Republic) Krenek Motorsport	11	(Italy) Giulio Glorioso		8
(Czech Republic) Krenek Motorsport	14	(Czech Republic) Jakub Knoll		2–8
(Italy) Cram Competition	16	(Brazil) Henrique Martins	J	1–5
(Italy) Cram Competition	16	(Spain) Pedro Quesada		8
(Italy) Cram Competition	17	(Brazil) André Negrão	J	All
(Austria) Interwetten	18	(United Kingdom) Luciano Bacheta		All
(Austria) Interwetten	19	(Germany) Craig Reiff		1–2
(Austria) Interwetten	19	(Austria) Sandro Lukovic		3–8
(Austria) Interwetten	65	(Italy) Federico Scionti		7
(Austria) Interwetten	65	(Switzerland) Christof von Grünigen		8
(Italy) One Racing	22	(United Kingdom) Jordan Oakes		1–3
(Italy) One Racing	23	(Italy) Daniel Mancinelli		1–2
(Finland) Koiranen Bros Motorsport	26	(Netherlands) Bart Hylkema		All
(Finland) Koiranen Bros Motorsport	27	(Finland) Miki Weckström	J	All
(Finland) Koiranen Bros Motorsport	28	(Estonia) Kevin Korjus	J	All
(Finland) Koiranen Bros Motorsport	29	(Finland) Jukka Honkavuori		1–6
(Finland) Koiranen Bros Motorsport	29	(Finland) Jesse Laine		7
(Finland) Koiranen Bros Motorsport	29	(Russia) Daniil Kvyat		8
(France) Boetti Racing Team	31	(Luxembourg) Brice Bosi		All
(United Kingdom) Manor Competition	51	(United Kingdom) Will Stevens		5
(United Kingdom) Atech Grand Prix	57	(Hungary) Tamás Pál Kiss		5
(United Kingdom) Atech Grand Prix	58	(United Kingdom) Nick Yelloly		5
(United Kingdom) Atech Grand Prix	59	(Philippines) Marlon Stockinger		5
(United Kingdom) Team Firstair	60	(Russia) Ivan Lukashevich		5
(United Kingdom) Team Firstair	60	(Netherlands) Liroy Stuart		7
(United Kingdom) Team Firstair	61	(Indonesia) Rio Haryanto	J	5
(United Kingdom) Team Firstair	61	(United Kingdom) Richard Singleton		7
(Germany) SL Formula Racing	62	(Germany) Kevin Mirocha		6
(Denmark) KEO Racing	63	(Belgium) Ludwig Ghidi	J	6
(Poland) Kochanski Motorsport Project	64	(Poland) Jakub Śmiechowski		6, 8

Icon	Class
J	Junior Class

== Race calendar ==
- The series was a part of the World Series by Renault, supporting the Formula Renault 3.5 Series at all races except Monaco. An FIA press release confirmed all races except the rounds at Motorland Aragón and Magny-Cours.

Round		Circuit	Date	Pole position	Fastest lap	Winning driver	Winning team
1	R1	(Spain) Ciudad del Motor de Aragón, Alcañiz	17 April	(Brazil) André Negrão	(United Kingdom) Luciano Bacheta	(Estonia) Kevin Korjus	(Finland) Koiranen Bros Motorsport
1	R2	(Spain) Ciudad del Motor de Aragón, Alcañiz	18 April	(France) Arthur Pic	(Spain) Genís Olivé	(Estonia) Kevin Korjus	(Finland) Koiranen Bros Motorsport
2	R1	(Belgium) Circuit de Spa-Francorchamps	1 May	(France) Arthur Pic	(France) Arthur Pic	(France) Arthur Pic	(France) Tech 1 Racing
2	R2	(Belgium) Circuit de Spa-Francorchamps	2 May	(France) Arthur Pic	(Estonia) Kevin Korjus	(Estonia) Kevin Korjus	(Finland) Koiranen Bros Motorsport
3	R1	(Czech Republic) Masaryk Circuit, Brno	5 June	(France) Arthur Pic	(France) Arthur Pic	(France) Arthur Pic	(France) Tech 1 Racing
3	R2	(Czech Republic) Masaryk Circuit, Brno	6 June	(France) Arthur Pic	(France) Arthur Pic	(France) Arthur Pic	(France) Tech 1 Racing
4	R1	(France) Circuit de Nevers Magny-Cours	19 June	(France) Arthur Pic	(Finland) Miki Weckström	(Estonia) Kevin Korjus	(Finland) Koiranen Bros Motorsport
4	R2	(France) Circuit de Nevers Magny-Cours	20 June	(France) Arthur Pic	(United Kingdom) Luciano Bacheta	(Italy) Giovanni Venturini	(Spain) Epsilon Euskadi
5	R1	(Hungary) Hungaroring, Budapest	3 July	(Finland) Aaro Vainio	(France) Arthur Pic	(France) Arthur Pic	(France) Tech 1 Racing
5	R2	(Hungary) Hungaroring, Budapest	4 July	(Finland) Aaro Vainio	(Hungary) Tamás Pál Kiss	(United Kingdom) Luciano Bacheta	(Austria) Interwetten Junior Team
6	R1	(Germany) Hockenheimring	4 September	(Estonia) Kevin Korjus	(Finland) Aaro Vainio	(Estonia) Kevin Korjus	(Finland) Koiranen Bros Motorsport
6	R2	(Germany) Hockenheimring	5 September	(Estonia) Kevin Korjus	(Finland) Aaro Vainio	(Estonia) Kevin Korjus	(Finland) Koiranen Bros Motorsport
7	R1	(United Kingdom) Silverstone Circuit	18 September	(Estonia) Kevin Korjus	(Spain) Carlos Sainz Jr.	(Estonia) Kevin Korjus	(Finland) Koiranen Bros Motorsport
7	R2	(United Kingdom) Silverstone Circuit	19 September	(Estonia) Kevin Korjus	(Spain) Carlos Sainz Jr.	(Spain) Javier Tarancón	(Spain) Epsilon Euskadi
8	R1	(Spain) Circuit de Catalunya, Barcelona	9 October	(Estonia) Kevin Korjus	(Estonia) Kevin Korjus	(Estonia) Kevin Korjus	(Finland) Koiranen Bros Motorsport
8	R2	(Spain) Circuit de Catalunya, Barcelona	10 October	(Estonia) Kevin Korjus	(Estonia) Kevin Korjus	(Estonia) Kevin Korjus	(Finland) Koiranen Bros Motorsport

== Championship standings ==
- Points for both championships are awarded as follows:

1st	2nd	3rd	4th	5th	6th	7th	8th	9th	10th
15	12	10	8	6	5	4	3	2	1

=== Drivers' Championship ===
Pos	Driver	ARA (Spain)		SPA (Belgium)		BRN (Czech Republic)		MAG (France)		HUN (Hungary)		HOC (Germany)		SIL (United Kingdom)		CAT (Spain)		Points
Pos	Driver	1	2	3	4	5	6	7	8	9	10	11	12	13	14	15	16	Points
1	(Estonia) Kevin Korjus **J**	1	1	2	1	4	7	1	3	Ret	6	**1**	**1**	**1**	**3**	**1**	**1**	187
2	(United Kingdom) Luciano Bacheta	3	4	5	4	3	3	Ret	2	18	1	13	5	4	2	9	6	124
3	(France) Arthur Pic	14	**Ret**	**1**	**DNS**	**1**	**1**	**2**	**6**	1	2	3	3	7	8	11	DSQ	123
4	(Finland) Aaro Vainio **J**	6	Ret	7	12	5	8	6	Ret	**3**	**3**	2	2	5	5	2	Ret	101
5	(Italy) Giovanni Venturini	4	Ret	Ret	8	15	11	4	**1**	6	10	10	Ret	Ret	6	6	2	76
6	(Netherlands) Bart Hylkema	Ret	3	Ret	DNS	9	4	Ret	8	9	5	7	7	20	10	8	3	64
7	(Spain) Genís Olivé **J**	11	15	3	6	7	5	Ret	7	4	7	8	17			7	4	62
8	(Spain) Alex Riberas **J**	10	5	Ret	DNS	6	2	10	Ret	10	13	11	12	14	9	3	7	55
9	(Netherlands) Daniël de Jong **J**	2	16	17	7	8	Ret	Ret	5	Ret	15	14	10	11	7	4	10	48
10	(Finland) Jukka Honkavuori	12	7	13	2	17	10	7	4	Ret	23	Ret	Ret					29
11	(Czech Republic) Adam Kout			6	5	2	Ret	DNS	DNS	7	Ret							29
12	(France) Hugo Valente **J**	8	2	14	15	12	14	8	Ret	16	Ret	Ret	8	9	DNS	Ret	Ret	28
13	(Brazil) André Negrão **J**	**Ret**	Ret	Ret	3	11	Ret	11	9	Ret	18	Ret	9	10	13	13	9	25
14	(Estonia) Karl-Oscar Liiv **J**	5	14	8	10					11	25	12	Ret	8	Ret	10	Ret	22
15	(Finland) Miki Weckström **J**	Ret	Ret	Ret	13	DNS	Ret	3	10	Ret	21	5	Ret	Ret	11	Ret	Ret	21
16	(Spain) Miguel Otegui **J**	9	8	16	9	Ret	6	5	Ret	Ret	12							21
17	(Italy) Daniel Mancinelli	7	9	4	11													14
18	(Austria) Sandro Lukovic					13	12	13	Ret	8	14	Ret	15	18	16	Ret	Ret	6
19	(Luxembourg) Brice Bosi	16	10	15	14	14	Ret	9	13	12	24	Ret	Ret	12	15	12	Ret	6
20	(United Kingdom) Jordan Oakes	Ret	6	11	Ret	DNS	Ret											5
21	(Brazil) Henrique Martins **J**	17	11	9	Ret	10	Ret	Ret	12	15	17							3
22	(Finland) Kalle Kulmanen **J**	15	12	Ret	17	18	9	Ret	11	17	22	15	14	17	DNS	Ret	Ret	3
23	(Czech Republic) Jakub Knoll			12	16	16	13	12	Ret	Ret	20	17	16	19	19	Ret	12	2
24	(Germany) Craig Reiff	13	13	10	Ret													1
Guest drivers ineligible for points
	(Spain) Javier Tarancón											4	4	2	1	5	15	0
	(United Kingdom) Will Stevens									2	4							0
	(Spain) Carlos Sainz Jr.													3	18	Ret	5	0
	(United Kingdom) Richard Singleton													6	4			0
	(Philippines) Marlon Stockinger									5	8							0
	(Belgium) Ludwig Ghidi **J**											6	6					0
	(Russia) Daniil Kvyat															18	8	0
	(Germany) Kevin Mirocha											9	11					0
	(Hungary) Tamás Pál Kiss									Ret	9							0
	(United Kingdom) Nick Yelloly									13	11							0
	(Switzerland) Christof von Grünigen															14	11	0
	(Netherlands) Liroy Stuart													15	12			0
	(Italy) Giulio Glorioso															15	13	0
	(Poland) Jakub Śmiechowski											16	13			16	Ret	0
	(Italy) Federico Scionti													13	17			0
	(Finland) Jesse Laine													16	14			0
	(Spain) Pedro Quesada															17	14	0
	(Russia) Ivan Lukashevich									14	19							0
	(Indonesia) Rio Haryanto **J**									19	16							0
	(Slovakia) Richard Gonda													23	20			0
Pos	Driver	ARA (Spain)		SPA (Belgium)		BRN (Czech Republic)		MAG (France)		HUN (Hungary)		HOC (Germany)		SIL (United Kingdom)		CAT (Spain)		Points

Colour	Result
Gold	Winner
Silver	Second place
Bronze	Third place
Green	Points classification
Blue	Non-points classification
Blue	Non-classified finish (NC)
Purple	Retired, not classified (Ret)
Red	Did not qualify (DNQ)
Red	Did not pre-qualify (DNPQ)
Black	Disqualified (DSQ)
White	Did not start (DNS)
White	Withdrew (WD)
White	Race cancelled (C)
Blank	Did not practice (DNP)
Blank	Did not arrive (DNA)
Blank	Excluded (EX)

**Bold** – Pole
Italics – Fastest Lap

=== Teams' Championship ===
Pos	Team	ARA (Spain)		SPA (Belgium)		BRN (Czech Republic)		MAG (France)		HUN (Hungary)		HOC (Germany)		SIL (United Kingdom)		CAT (Spain)		Points
1	(France) Tech 1 Racing	6	Ret	1	12	1	1	2	6	1	2	2	2	5	5	2	5	224
1	(France) Tech 1 Racing	14	Ret	7	15	5	8	6	Ret	3	3	3	3	7	8	11	Ret	224
2	(Finland) Koiranen Bros Motorsport	1	1	2	1	4	4	1	3	Ret	6	1	1	1	3	1	1	211
2	(Finland) Koiranen Bros Motorsport	12	3	13	13	17	Ret	Ret	8	Ret	21	5	Ret	20	10	18	8	211
3	(Austria) Interwetten Junior Team	3	4	5	4	3	3	13	2	8	1	13	5	4	2	9	6	131
3	(Austria) Interwetten Junior Team	13	13	10	Ret	13	12	Ret	Ret	18	14	Ret	15	18	16	14	11	131
4	(Spain) Epsilon Euskadi	4	8	3	6	7	5	5	Ret	6	7	8	17	14	6	3	4	113
4	(Spain) Epsilon Euskadi	9	15	16	8	15	11	10	Ret	10	8	10	Ret	Ret	9	7	7	113
5	(Netherlands) MP Motorsport	2	12	8	7	8	9	Ret	5	11	15	12	10	8	7	4	10	72
5	(Netherlands) MP Motorsport	5	14	17	10	18	Ret	Ret	11	17	22	14	14	11	Ret	10	Ret	72
6	(Czech Republic) Krenek Motorsport			6	5	2	13	12	Ret	7	20	17	16	19	19	15	12	31
6	(Czech Republic) Krenek Motorsport			12	16	16	Ret	DNS	DNS	Ret	Ret					Ret	13	31
7	(Italy) Cram Competition	17	11	9	3	10	Ret	11	9	15	17	Ret	9	10	13	13	9	28
7	(Italy) Cram Competition	Ret	Ret	Ret	Ret	11	Ret	Ret	12	Ret	18					17	14	28
8	(Italy) One Racing	7	6	4	11	DNS	Ret											19
8	(Italy) One Racing	Ret	9	11	Ret													19
9	(France) Boetti Racing Team	16	10	15	14	14	Ret	9	13	12	24	Ret	Ret	12	15	12	Ret	6
Guest teams ineligible for points
	(United Kingdom) Manor Competition									2	4							0
	(United Kingdom) Team Firstair									14	16			6	4			0
	(United Kingdom) Team Firstair									19	19			15	12			0
	(United Kingdom) Atech Grand Prix									5	8							0
	(United Kingdom) Atech Grand Prix									13	9							0
	(Denmark) KEO Racing											6	6					0
	(Germany) SL Formula Racing											9	11					0
	(Poland) Kochanski Motorsport											16	13			16	Ret	0
Pos	Team	ARA (Spain)		SPA (Belgium)		BRN (Czech Republic)		MAG (France)		HUN (Hungary)		HOC (Germany)		SIL (United Kingdom)		CAT (Spain)		Points

Colour	Result
Gold	Winner
Silver	Second place
Bronze	Third place
Green	Points classification
Blue	Non-points classification
Blue	Non-classified finish (NC)
Purple	Retired, not classified (Ret)
Red	Did not qualify (DNQ)
Red	Did not pre-qualify (DNPQ)
Black	Disqualified (DSQ)
White	Did not start (DNS)
White	Withdrew (WD)
White	Race cancelled (C)
Blank	Did not practice (DNP)
Blank	Did not arrive (DNA)
Blank	Excluded (EX)

**Bold** – Pole
Italics – Fastest Lap
