= Kevin Korjus =

Estonian racing driver

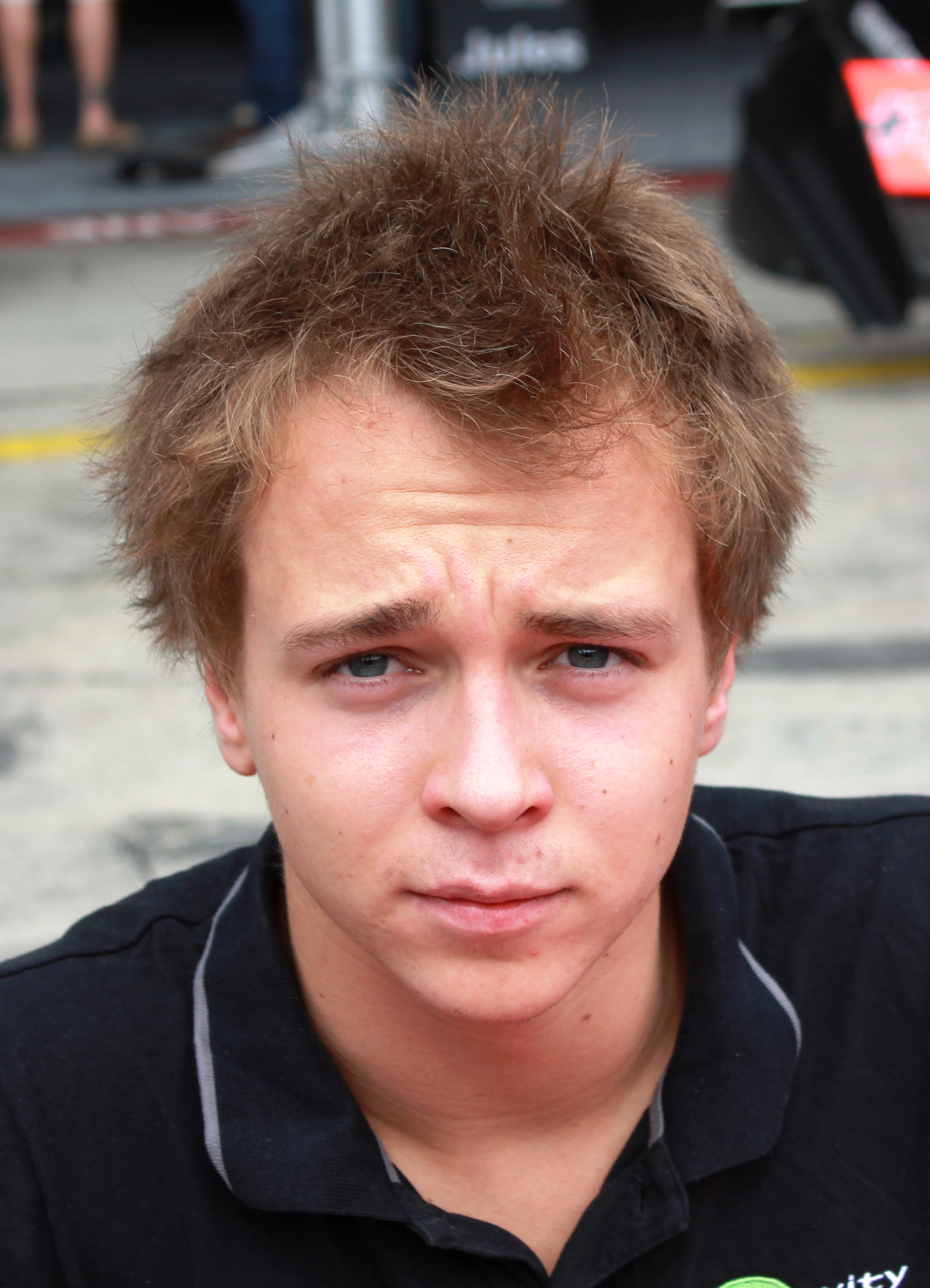
- Korjus at the Nürburgring round of the 2012 Formula Renault 3.5 Series season
- Nationality: Estonian
- Born: 9 January 1993 (age 33) Tallinn, Estonia

European Le Mans Series (GTC) career
- Debut season: 2014
- Current team: ART Grand Prix
- Categorisation: FIA Gold
- Car number: 98
- Starts: 5
- Wins: 0
- Poles: 0
- Fastest laps: 1

Previous series
- 2013 2011–2012 2011 2010 2009–10 2008 2008 2008: GP3 Series; Formula Renault 3.5 Series; Auto GP; Eurocup Formula Renault 2.0; Formula Renault 2.0 NEC; Formula Renault 2.0 Finland; Formula Renault 2.0 NEZ; Formula Renault 2.0 Estonia

Championship titles
- 2007 2010: Rotax Max Challenge - Junior; Eurocup Formula Renault 2.0

Kevin Korjus (born 9 January 1993) is an Estonian former racing driver.

== Career ==
=== Karting ===
Korjus was born in Tallinn, the son of former sidecarcross racer Aivar Korjus. He made his pan-European karting début in 2006, competing in the Rotax Max Euro Challenge for the AGS Racing team. He finished sixth overall in the championship standings, 25 points behind the champion Jack Hawksworth. As well as that, he finished thirteenth in the Challenge finals, as well as being Estonian champion at Junior level. 2007 saw Korjus win the Estonian title once again, and he also picked up the Baltic Junior title and was the winner of the Rotax Max finals. He did however finish runner-up by two points to Mats van den Brand in the Euro Challenge. In 2008, Korjus competed in the Junior classes in the pan-European championship, but progressed to the Senior class in his local championships. In the Junior championships, he won the Euro Challenge and was second to Facundo Chapur in the Challenge Finals and Rotax Max Grand Finals at La Conca, Italy, 2008.

=== Formula Renault 2.0 ===
While completing his career in karts, Korjus also spent 2008 adjusting to single-seaters, competing in the first Finnish Formula Renault championship. Racing for the T.T. Racing Team, Korjus finished all but one race on the podium, as he finished runner-up to Jesse Krohn in the championship. Of those podiums, three were race victories that came in the final four races of the season, including a double at Ahvenisto. Korjus continued with the team into the 2009 season, but moved into the Formula Renault 2.0 Northern European Cup. Korjus finished all bar one race as he finished fifth in the championship; his best result being a second-place finish at Most.

Korjus stepped up to the Eurocup Formula Renault 2.0 championship for its 2010 season, and moved to the Koiranen Bros. Motorsport team. Despite qualifying on the third row for both races, Korjus won them both, becoming the first driver to win a race in the championship in the newly introduced cars designed by Barazi-Epsilon. He is also the youngest person to win a Eurocup Formula Renault 2.0 season.

=== Formula Renault 3.5 Series ===
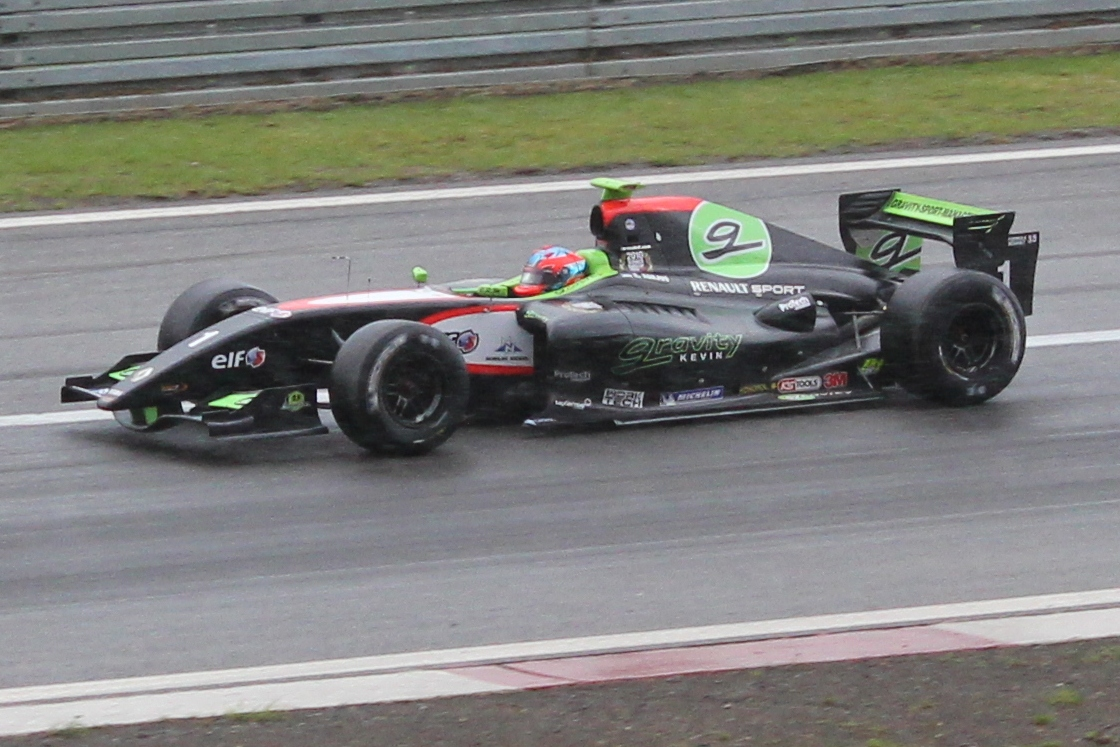
Kevin Korjus at the 2011 Nürburgring World series by Renault round after winning the race

With his results and potential in the Formula Renault series, Korjus joined the Renault Driver Development programme for the continuation of his career. He was signed to drive for Formula Renault 3.5 Series team Tech 1 Racing in late 2010. On April 17, 2011, he became the youngest driver to win a race in Formula Renault 3.5 Series – at 18 years 3 months and 8 days – with his victory in Monaco in 2008. In 2011 season he placed sixth place overall and second in the Rookie of the Year standings, and finished the season with fastest lap, three wins and four podium finishes during the season.

Korjus began the 2012 season with Tech 1, where he was partnered with series debutant Jules Bianchi. Korjus endured a difficult season, with a string of early retirements and mechanical problems that affected his qualifying performances, though he recovered to finish on the podium in the second race at the Moscow Raceway. However, with three rounds left in the season, Korjus left Tech-1 and joined the Lotus-backed Charouz Racing System team, and his place at Tech 1 was taken by GP3 series runner-up Daniel Abt.

=== GP3 Series ===
Korjus left the Formula Renault 3.5 Series at the end of the 2012 season, moving to the GP3 Series for 2013, racing for Koiranen GP. He finished the season seventh overall, recording four podiums, and finished in the points in 11 of the season's 16 races.

=== Formula One ===
Korjus had his first outing in a Formula One car at the Abu Dhabi young driver test on November 16, 2011, driving a Renault R31.

Korjus served as Lotus F1's testing and reserve driver at the 2012 Italian Grand Prix. With regular driver Romain Grosjean serving a one-race ban for causing a serious accident at the Belgian Grand Prix, the team promoted regular test driver Jérôme d'Ambrosio to fill Grosjean's seat for the race, and Korjus was recruited to fill in the vacant reserve driver position.

=== European Le Mans Series ===
In 2014, Korjus moved to sports car racing, driving an ART Grand Prix McLaren MP4-12C in the European Le Mans Series.

== Racing record ==
=== Career summary ===
Season	Series	Team	Races	Wins	Poles	F/Laps	Podiums	Points	Position
2008	Formula Renault 2.0 Finland	T.T. Racing Team	12	3	0	4	11	290	**2nd**
2008	Formula Renault 2.0 NEZ	T.T. Racing Team	4	0	0	0	2	55	**3rd**
2008	Formula Renault 2.0 Estonia	T.T. Racing Team	2	0	0	0	2	40	4th
2009	Formula Renault 2.0 NEC	T.T. Racing Team	16	0	0	0	1	201	5th
2010	Formula Renault 2.0 Eurocup	Koiranen Bros. Motorsport	16	9	6	3	12	187	**1st**
2010	Formula Renault 2.0 NEC	Koiranen Bros. Motorsport	5	5	3	3	5	150	8th
2011	Formula Renault 3.5 Series	Tech 1 Racing	17	3	0	1	4	120	6th
2011	Auto GP	DAMS	2	0	0	0	0	7	18th
2012	Formula Renault 3.5 Series	Tech 1 Racing	11	0	0	0	1	69	10th
2012	Formula Renault 3.5 Series	Lotus	6	0	0	0	0	69	10th
2012	Macau Grand Prix	Double R Racing	1	0	0	0	0	N/A	13th
2012	Formula One	Lotus F1 Team	Reserve driver						
2013	GP3 Series	Koiranen GP	16	0	1	1	4	107	7th
2013	FIA Formula 3 European Championship	ThreeBond with T-Sport	3	0	0	0	0	0	30th
2013	Macau Grand Prix	Double R Racing	1	0	0	0	0	N/A	21st
2014	European Le Mans Series - GTC	ART Grand Prix	5	0	0	1	1	45	5th
2014	Blancpain Endurance Series - Pro	ART Grand Prix	5	0	0	0	2	48	8th
2015	24H Series - A6	GT Russian Team							
2016	Renault Sport Trophy - Pro	R-ace GP	9	1	0	0	4	111	**2nd**
2016	Renault Sport Endurance Trophy	R-ace GP	6	1	1	0	2	67	4th

=== Complete Formula Renault 2.0 NEC results ===
(key) (Races in bold indicate pole position) (Races in italics indicate fastest lap)

Year	Entrant	1	2	3	4	5	6	7	8	9	10	11	12	13	14	15	16	17	18	19	20	DC	Points
2009	TT Racing	ZAN; 1; 11	ZAN; 2; 8	HOC; 1; 9	HOC; 2; 8	ALA; 1; 4	ALA; 2; 6	OSC; 1; 6	OSC; 2; 9	ASS; 1; 9	ASS; 2; 7	MST; 1; 2	MST; 2 Ret	NÜR; 1; 8	NÜR; 2; 6	SPA; 1; 9	SPA; 2; 7					5th	201
2010	Koiranen Bros. Motorsport	HOC; 1	HOC; 2	**BRN**; **1**; 1	**BRN**; **2**; 1	ZAN; 1	ZAN; 2	OSC; 1	OSC; 2	OSC; 3	ASS; 1	ASS; 2	**MST**; **1**; 1	MST; 2; 1	MST; 3; 1	SPA; 1	SPA; 2	SPA; 3	NÜR; 1	NÜR; 2	NÜR; 3	8th	150

=== Complete Eurocup Formula Renault 2.0 results ===
(key) (Races in bold indicate pole position; races in italics indicate fastest lap)

Year	Entrant	1	2	3	4	5	6	7	8	9	10	11	12	13	14	15	16	DC	Points
2010	Koiranen Bros. Motorsport	ALC; 1; 1	ALC; 2; 1	SPA; 1; 2	SPA; 2; 1	BRN; 1; 4	BRN; 2; 7	MAG; 1; 1	MAG; 2; 3	HUN; 1 Ret	HUN; 2; 6	**HOC**; **1**; 1	**HOC**; **2**; 1	**SIL**; **1**; 1	**SIL**; **2**; 3	**CAT**; **1**; 1	**CAT**; **2**; 1	1st	187

=== Complete Formula Renault 3.5 Series results ===
(key) (Races in bold indicate pole position) (Races in italics indicate fastest lap)

Year	Team	1	2	3	4	5	6	7	8	9	10	11	12	13	14	15	16	17	Pos	Points
2011	Tech 1 Racing	ALC; 1 Ret	ALC; 2; 1	SPA; 1 Ret	SPA; 2 Ret	MNZ; 1; 1	MNZ; 2 Ret	MON; 1; 4	NÜR; 1; 3	NÜR; 2; 1	HUN; 1; 6	HUN; 2; 23	SIL; 1; 8	SIL; 2; 8	LEC; 1; 9	LEC; 2; 18	CAT; 1; 11	CAT; 2 Ret	6th	120
2012	Tech 1 Racing	ALC; 1 Ret	ALC; 2; 4	MON; 1; 4	SPA; 1 DNS	SPA; 2; 13	NÜR; 1; 14	NÜR; 2 Ret	MSC; 1; 5	MSC; 2; 3	SIL; 1 Ret	SIL; 2; 15							10th	69
2012	Lotus												HUN; 1; 12	HUN; 2; 7	LEC; 1; 9	LEC; 2; 8	CAT; 1; 6	CAT; 2; 17	10th	69

=== Complete Auto GP Results ===
(key) (Races in bold indicate pole position) (Races in italics indicate fastest lap)

Year	Entrant	1	2	3	4	5	6	7	8	9	10	11	12	13	14	Pos	Points
2011	Super Nova Racing	MNZ; 1	MNZ; 2	HUN; 1	HUN; 2	BRN; 1	BRN; 2	DON; 1	DON; 2	OSC; 1; 10	OSC; 2; 5	VAL; 1	VAL; 2	MUG; 1	MUG; 2	18th	7

=== Complete GP3 Series results ===
(key) (Races in bold indicate pole position) (Races in italics indicate fastest lap)

Year	Entrant	1	2	3	4	5	6	7	8	9	10	11	12	13	14	15	16	D.C.	Points
2013	Koiranen GP	CAT; FEA; 8	CAT; SPR; 2	VAL; FEA; 3	VAL; SPR; 6	**SIL**; **FEA**; 2	SIL; SPR; 9	NÜR; FEA; 20†	NÜR; SPR; 15	HUN; FEA; 7	HUN; SPR; 3	SPA; FEA; 4	SPA; SPR; 5	MNZ; FEA; 6	MNZ; SPR; 5	YMC; FEA; 12	YMC; SPR; 12	7th	107

Sporting positions
Preceded by Albert Costa	Eurocup Formula Renault 2.0; Champion; 2010	Succeeded by Robin Frijns
