= Tio Ellinas =

Cypriot racing driver (born 1992)

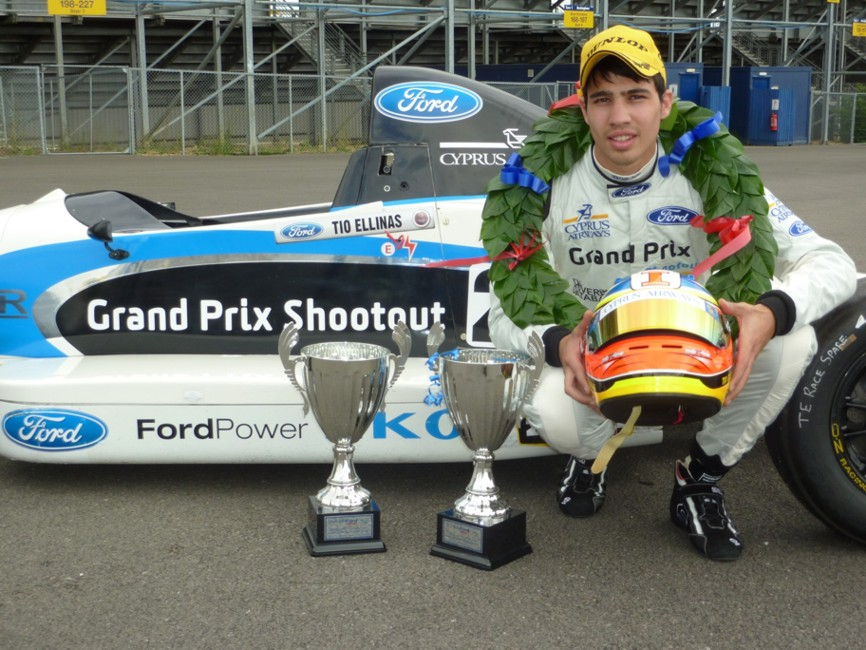
- Tio Ellinas as a Formula Ford driver in 2010.
- Nationality: Cypriot
- Born: Eftihios Ellinas; 27 January 1992 (age 34) Larnaca, Cyprus

Porsche Carrera Cup Great Britain career
- Debut season: 2017
- Current team: Redline Racing
- Categorisation: FIA Gold
- Car number: 1
- Former teams: JTR, Slidesports Engineering
- Starts: 34
- Wins: 1
- Poles: 2
- Fastest laps: 4
- Best finish: 1st in 2018

Previous series
- 2015 2014 2013–14 2012–13 2011 2010: Formula Renault 3.5 Series; GP2 Series; MRF Challenge; GP3 Series; Formula Renault UK; British Formula Ford Championship

Championship titles
- 2018 2009: Porsche Carrera Cup GB; Grand Prix Shootout

Awards
- 2010: FF UK Rookie of the Year

Eftihios "Tio" Ellinas (born 27 January 1992 in Larnaca, Cyprus) is a Cypriot race car driver. Ellinas began racing go-karts at the age of seven, and from 2003 to 2009, won ten kart racing championships in Cyprus, in 2005 winning the ROK Cup International Final. He was the winner of Grand Prix Shootout in the UK in 2009 competing against 50 other top young drivers from all over the world.

In 2010, Ellinas competed in the MSA Dunlop Formula Ford Championship of Great Britain racing with the JTR Team. He won three races and finished fourth in the championship, the highest placing for a novice driver since Jenson Button in 1998, earning him "Rookie Of The Year" honors.

In 2011, Ellinas raced in the UK Formula Renault 2.0 championship for the Atech Reid GP Team, finishing third overall. He joined Marussia Manor Racing for the 2012 GP3 Series season.

In 2013, Ellinas tested for the Marussia F1 Team.

== Career ==
=== Karting ===
Ellinas' first taste of motorsport came when he was seven years old racing in karts. He competed in 131 races, winning 101 of them with 20 further podium finishes. His championship positions are as follows:

- Third in Cyprus Karting Championship – KZ2 2009.
- Second in ROK Cup Cyprus – Super Class 2009.
- Cyprus Karting Championship – KF2 champion 2009.
- Bridgestone Cup Cyprus champion in the KZ2 class 2009.
- Second in Cyprus Karting Championship – KZ2 2008.
- Third in ROK Cup Cyprus – Senior 2007.
- Cyprus Rotax Max Challenge champion in the Junior class 2006.
- Cyprus champion in the ICA Junior class 2006.
- ROK Cup International Final champion in the Junior ROK class 2005.
- ROK Cup Cyprus – Junior champion 2005.
- Cyprus champion in the ICA Junior class 2005.
- Cyprus Rotax Max Challenge champion in the Junior class 2004.
- Cyprus champion in the ICA Junior class 2004.
- Cyprus Rotax Max Challenge champion in the Junior class 2003.

=== Grand Prix Shootout ===
Ellinas took part in the inaugural Grand Prix Shootout competition in the United Kingdom in 2009. He was assessed by the world-famous driving coach Rob Wilson in September 2009 as part of the competition. He then completed a number of sessions in a Double R Racing Formula BMW car at the Pembrey Circuit in Wales. In January 2010, Ellinas was announced as the first Grand Prix Shootout winner at the Autosport International exhibition. He had taken on fifty other karters and drivers with over 100 major racing titles between them, and in the end was the runaway winner.

=== Formula Ford ===
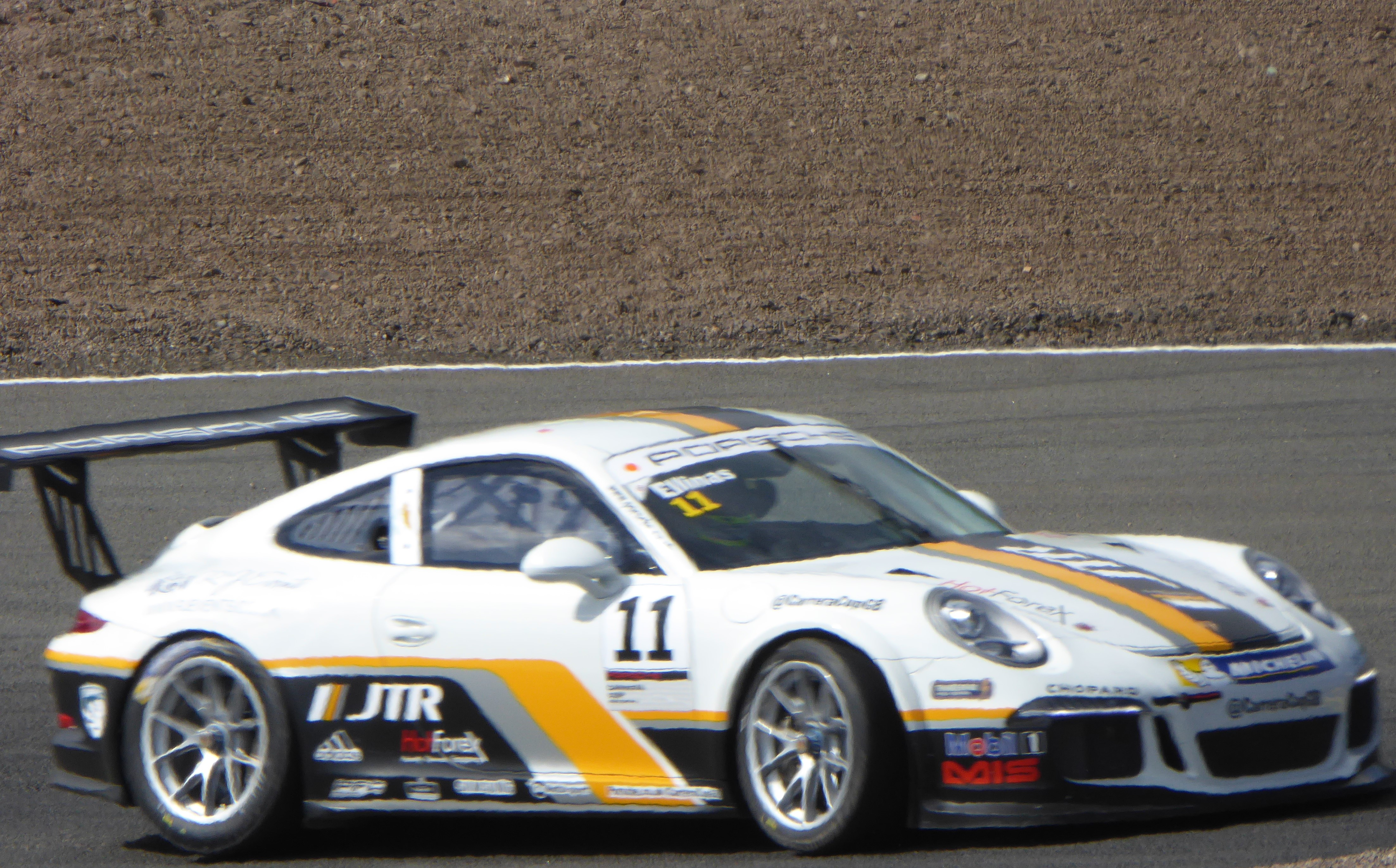
Ellinas, at the Knockhill round of the 2017 Porsche Carrera Cup Great Britain.

Ellinas competed in the MSA Dunlop Formula Ford Championship of Great Britain with the JTR team. He was only the second driver since the legendary Ayrton Senna to start on the front row of a British Formula Ford race in his car racing debut, and was also the fastest driver at every wet test during that first year. Ellinas's fourth position overall in the 2010 MSA British Formula Ford championship earned him Rookie Of The Year honors, and is the best result for a rookie driver since the current McLaren Formula One driver and 2009 World Drivers' Champion, Jenson Button, in 1998.

=== Formula Renault ===
Ellinas competed in the Formula Renault UK championship with the Atech Reid GP team and finished third overall.

=== GP3 Series ===
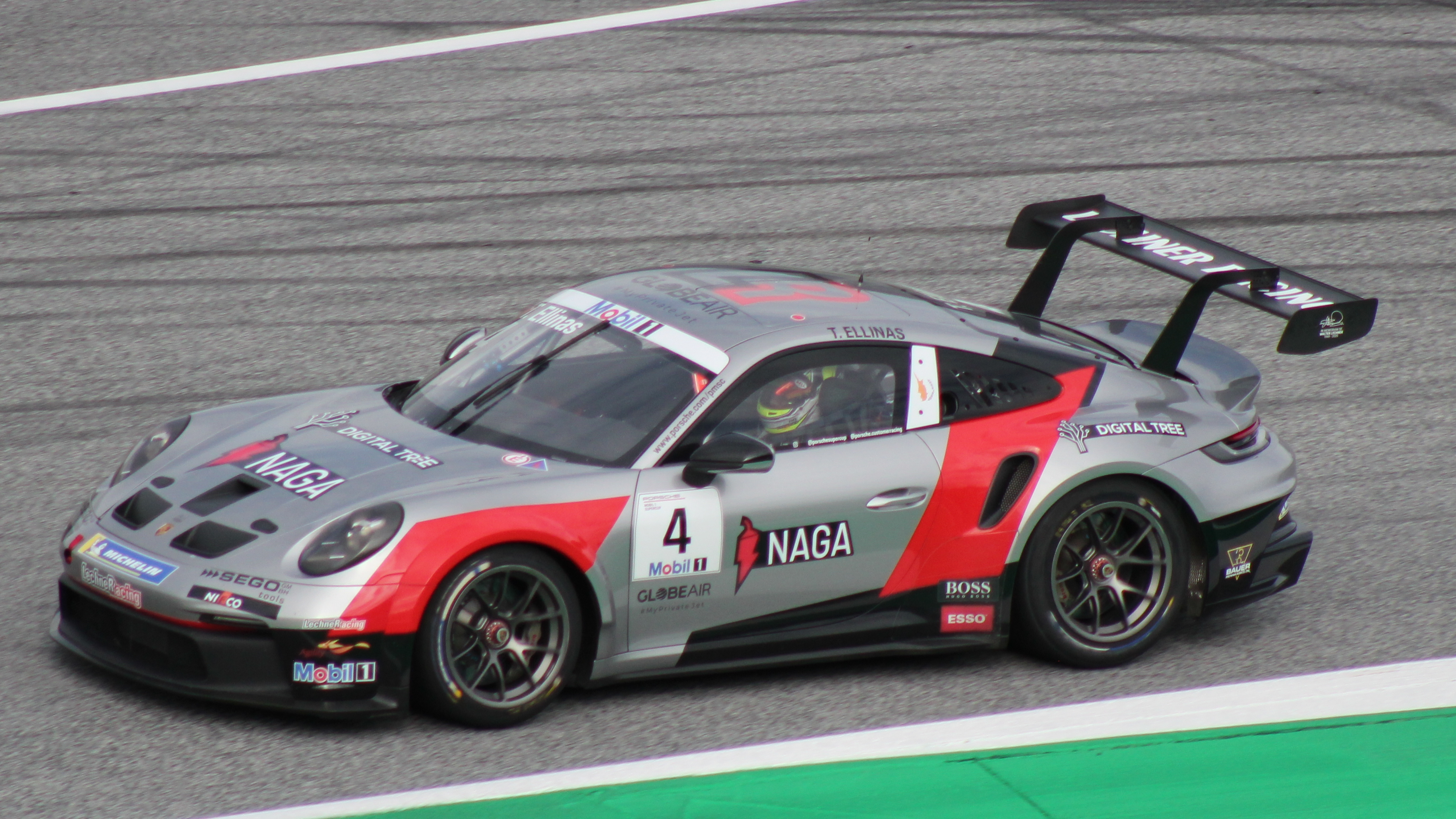
Ellinas driving at the Red Bull Ring in 2021.

Ellinas contested the 2012 GP3 Series season debut with Marussia Manor Racing. He finished the season eighth overall, recording one win and one podium finish in the season finale at Monza.

Ellinas returned to the championship for the 2013 GP3 Series season, once again with Marussia Manor Racing. He finished fourth in the standings, winning both the first and last races of the season.

=== Formula One ===
On 17 June 2013, it was announced that Ellinas would carry out a scheduled straightline aerodynamic evaluation test session with the Marussia Formula One team at Kemble airfield in Gloucestershire, England. In doing so, he became the first Cypriot to drive a Formula One car. As a reward for being the highest-placed Marussia Manor driver at the end of the 2012 GP3 Series season, Ellinas took part in the 2013 Young Driver Tests with Marussia F1.

== Racing record ==
=== Career summary ===
Season	Series	Team name	Races	Wins	Poles	F.L.	Podiums	Points	Position
2010	British Formula Ford Championship	JTR	25	3	2	4	8	451	4th
2010	Formula Ford Festival	JTR	4	2	2	3	4	N/A	**3rd**
2011	Formula Renault UK	Atech Reid GP	20	2	1	1	15	475	**3rd**
2011	Formula Renault 2.0 NEC	Atech Reid GP	2	1	1	0	1	47	26th
2012	GP3 Series	Marussia Manor Racing	16	1	0	3	2	97	8th
2013	GP3 Series	Marussia Manor Racing	16	2	1	1	3	116	4th
2013	Formula One	Marussia F1 Team	Test driver						
2013–14	MRF Challenge Formula 2000	MRF Racing	13	3	3	6	10	182	**2nd**
2014	GP2 Series	MP Motorsport	6	0	0	0	0	7	22nd
2014	GP2 Series	Rapax	2	0	0	0	0	7	22nd
2015	Formula Renault 3.5 Series	Strakka Racing	17	2	2	0	3	135	4th
2017	Porsche Carrera Cup GB	JTR	14	0	0	1	5	156	6th
2018	Porsche Carrera Cup GB	Slidesports Engineering	16	1	2	3	13	117	**1st**
2019	Porsche Supercup	Momo Megatron Lechner Racing Team	10	0	0	0	2	81	7th
2019	Porsche Carrera Cup GB	Redline Racing	4	0	0	0	3	0	NC†
2021	Porsche Supercup	BWT Lechner Racing	8	0	0	0	0	48	11th
2026	Porsche Carrera Cup France	Quanloop EST1 Racing	4	0	0	0	0	9	20th
2026	Porsche Carrera Cup Benelux	Quanloop EST1 Racing	4	0	0	0	1	49	15th

^{†} As Ellinas was a guest driver, he was ineligible to score points.

=== Complete Formula Renault 2.0 NEC results ===
(key) (Races in bold indicate pole position) (Races in italics indicate fastest lap)

Year	Entrant	1	2	3	4	5	6	7	8	9	10	11	12	13	14	15	16	17	18	19	20	DC	Points
2011	Atech Reid GP	HOC; 1	HOC; 2	HOC; 3	SPA; 1	SPA; 2	NÜR; 1	NÜR; 2	ASS; 1	ASS; 2	ASS; 3	**OSC**; **1**; 1	OSC; 2; 4	ZAN; 1	ZAN; 2	MST; 1	MST; 2	MST; 3	MNZ; 1	MNZ; 2	MNZ; 3	26th	47

=== Complete GP3 Series results ===
(key) (Races in bold indicate pole position; races in italics indicate fastest lap)

Year	Entrant	1	2	3	4	5	6	7	8	9	10	11	12	13	14	15	16	DC	Points
2012	Marussia Manor Racing	CAT; FEA; 7	CAT; SPR; 15	MON; FEA; 9	MON; SPR; 8	VAL; FEA; 4	VAL; SPR; 5	SIL; FEA; 6	SIL; SPR; 4	HOC; FEA; 10	HOC; SPR; 7	HUN; FEA; 13	HUN; SPR; 4	SPA; FEA; 4	SPA; SPR; Ret	MNZ; FEA; 2	MNZ; SPR; 1	8th	97
2013	Marussia Manor Racing	**CAT**; **FEA**; 1	CAT; SPR; 4	VAL; FEA; 6	VAL; SPR; 4	SIL; FEA; 5	SIL; SPR; 6	NÜR; FEA; 2	NÜR; SPR; 5	HUN; FEA; 11	HUN; SPR; 10	SPA; FEA; 8	SPA; SPR; Ret	MNZ; FEA; Ret	MNZ; SPR; 11	YMC; FEA; 7	YMC; SPR; 1	4th	116

=== Complete GP2 Series results ===
(key)

Year	Entrant	1	2	3	4	5	6	7	8	9	10	11	12	13	14	15	16	17	18	19	20	21	22	DC	Points
2014	MP Motorsport	BHR; FEA	BHR; SPR	CAT; FEA; 7	CAT; SPR; 11	MON; FEA; 10	MON; SPR; 22	RBR; FEA; 23	RBR; SPR; 22	SIL; FEA	SIL; SPR	HOC; FEA	HOC; SPR	HUN; FEA	HUN; SPR	SPA; FEA	SPA; SPR	MNZ; FEA	MNZ; SPR					22nd	7
2014	Rapax																			SOC; FEA; 21	SOC; SPR; 14	YMC; FEA	YMC; SPR	22nd	7

=== Complete Formula Renault 3.5 Series results ===
(key) (Races in bold indicate pole position)

Year	Team	1	2	3	4	5	6	7	8	9	10	11	12	13	14	15	16	17	Pos.	Points
2015	Strakka Racing	ALC; 1 Ret	ALC; 2; 4	MON; 1 Ret	SPA; 1; 7	SPA; 2; 5	HUN; 1; 17	HUN; 2; 6	RBR; 1; 9	RBR; 2; 13	**SIL**; **1**; 1	SIL; 2; 11	NÜR; 1; 6	NÜR; 2; 1	BUG; 1; 9	**BUG**; **2**; 3	JER; 1; 5	JER; 2; 4	4th	135

=== Complete Porsche Supercup results ===
(key) (Races in bold indicate pole position) (Races in italics indicate fastest lap)

Year	Team	1	2	3	4	5	6	7	8	9	10	Pos.	Points
2019	Momo Megatron Lechner Racing Team	CAT; 4	MON; 8	RBR; 10	SIL; 16	HOC; 3^{⹋}	HUN; 4	SPA; 6	MNZ; 11	MEX; 3	MEX; 11	7th	81
2021	BWT Lechner Racing	MON; 8	RBR; 12	RBR; 6	HUN; 7	SPA; 9	ZND; 17	MNZ; 11	MNZ; Ret			11th	48

^{⹋} No points awarded as less than 50% of race distance was completed.

== Personal life ==
Ellinas continues to live in Larnaca, Cyprus.

Sporting positions
Preceded by Charlie Eastwood	Porsche Carrera Cup GB; Champion; 2018	Succeeded by Dan Harper
