= 2015 Monaco GP2 Series round =

Pair of Monaco motor races

2015 Monaco GP2 round
Round details
- Round 3 of 11 rounds in the 2015 GP2 Series
- Layout of the Circuit de Monaco
- Location: Circuit de Monaco, Monte Carlo, Monaco
- Course: Street circuit 3.340 km (2.075 mi)

GP2 Series

Feature race
- Date: 22 May 2015
- Laps: 40

Pole position
Driver	(United States) Alexander Rossi	Racing Engineering
- Time: 1:37.019

Podium
First	(Belgium) Stoffel Vandoorne	ART Grand Prix
Second	(United States) Alexander Rossi	Racing Engineering
Third	(Spain) Sergio Canamasas	MP Motorsport

Fastest lap
Driver	(United Kingdom) Nick Yelloly	Hilmer Motorsport
- Time: 1:22.314 (on lap 23)

Sprint race
- Date: 23 May 2015
- Laps: 30

Podium
First	(New Zealand) Richie Stanaway	Status Grand Prix
Second	(Italy) Raffaele Marciello	Trident
Third	(Russia) Sergey Sirotkin	Rapax

Fastest lap
Driver	(France) Norman Nato	Arden International
- Time: 1:21.886 (on lap 17)

The 2015 Monaco GP2 Series round was a pair of motor races held on 22 and 23 May 2015 at the Circuit de Monaco, Monte Carlo, Monaco as part of the GP2 Series. It was the third round of the 2015 GP2 season and was run in support of the 2015 Monaco Grand Prix. The first race, a 40-lap feature event, was won by ART Grand Prix driver Stoffel Vandoorne who started from fourth position. Alexander Rossi finished second for Racing Engineering, and MP Motorsport driver Sergio Canamasas came in third. Status Grand Prix driver Richie Stanaway won the second event, a 30-lap sprint race, ahead of Trident's Raffaele Marciello and Sergey Sirotkin of the Rapax team.

Rossi, who started from pole position, was overtaken by Maricello at the start of the first lap. He had a small lead which was reduced because he was using super soft tyres which had higher degradation levels, allowing Rossi and Vandoorne to draw closer. Rossi gained the lead after Maricello made a pit stop for new tyres. Vandoorne became the new leader after passing Rossi when both drivers made pit stops, and maintained it to win the event. In the second race, Marciello began from pole position but lost the lead to Stanaway as a result of a slow start. The race was processional with few overtakes as Stanaway led the rest of the race to win.

Vandoorne's feature race victory was the seventh of his GP2 Series career and the third in a row in 2015. Stanaway's sprint race win was his and Status Grand Prix's first. The results of the round increased Vandoorne's lead in the Drivers' Championship to 44 points over Rossi who moved from third to second. Rio Haryanto fell to third, with Mitch Evans and Alex Lynn fourth and fifth. ART Grand Prix extended their lead over Racing Engineering in the Teams' Championship to 37 points ahead. Third-placed Campos Racing moved further ahead of DAMS, with eight rounds left in the season.

== Background ==
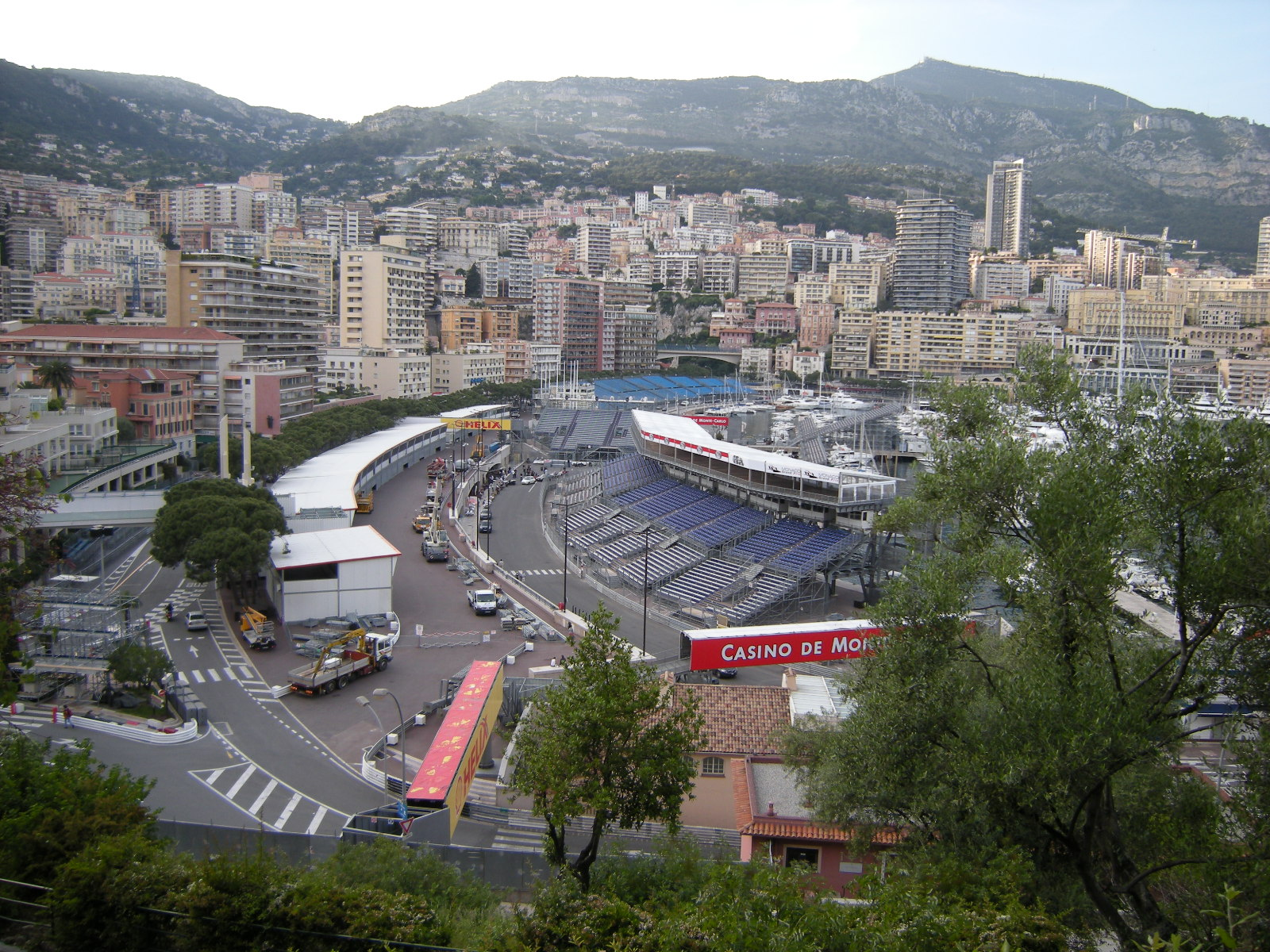
Circuit de Monaco, where the race was held.

The 2015 Monaco GP2 Series round was the third of eleven scheduled events in 2015. It was held on 22 and 23 May 2015 at the Circuit de Monaco, Monte Carlo, Monaco and supported the 2015 Monaco Grand Prix. Tyre supplier Pirelli brought the red-banded supersoft and the yellow-banded soft compound dry tyres along with one wet-weather compound to Monaco. The drag reduction system (DRS) had one activation zone for the race: on the main straight linking the final and first turns. A total of 13 teams of 2 participants each for a total of 26 competitors were entered for both races and every driver piloted the Dallara GP2/11 car.

Before the race, ART Grand Prix driver Stoffel Vandoorne led the Drivers' Championship with 86 points, 37 ahead of Rio Haryanto, who in turn, was a further three in front of Alexander Rossi in third. Mitch Evans was fourth on 28 points, and Alex Lynn was three points behind him in fifth place. ART Grand Prix led the Teams' Championship with 93 points; Racing Engineering in second were six points ahead of Campos Racing in third. DAMS were in fourth on 41 points, and Russian Time were fifth on 34 points.

== Practice and qualifying ==
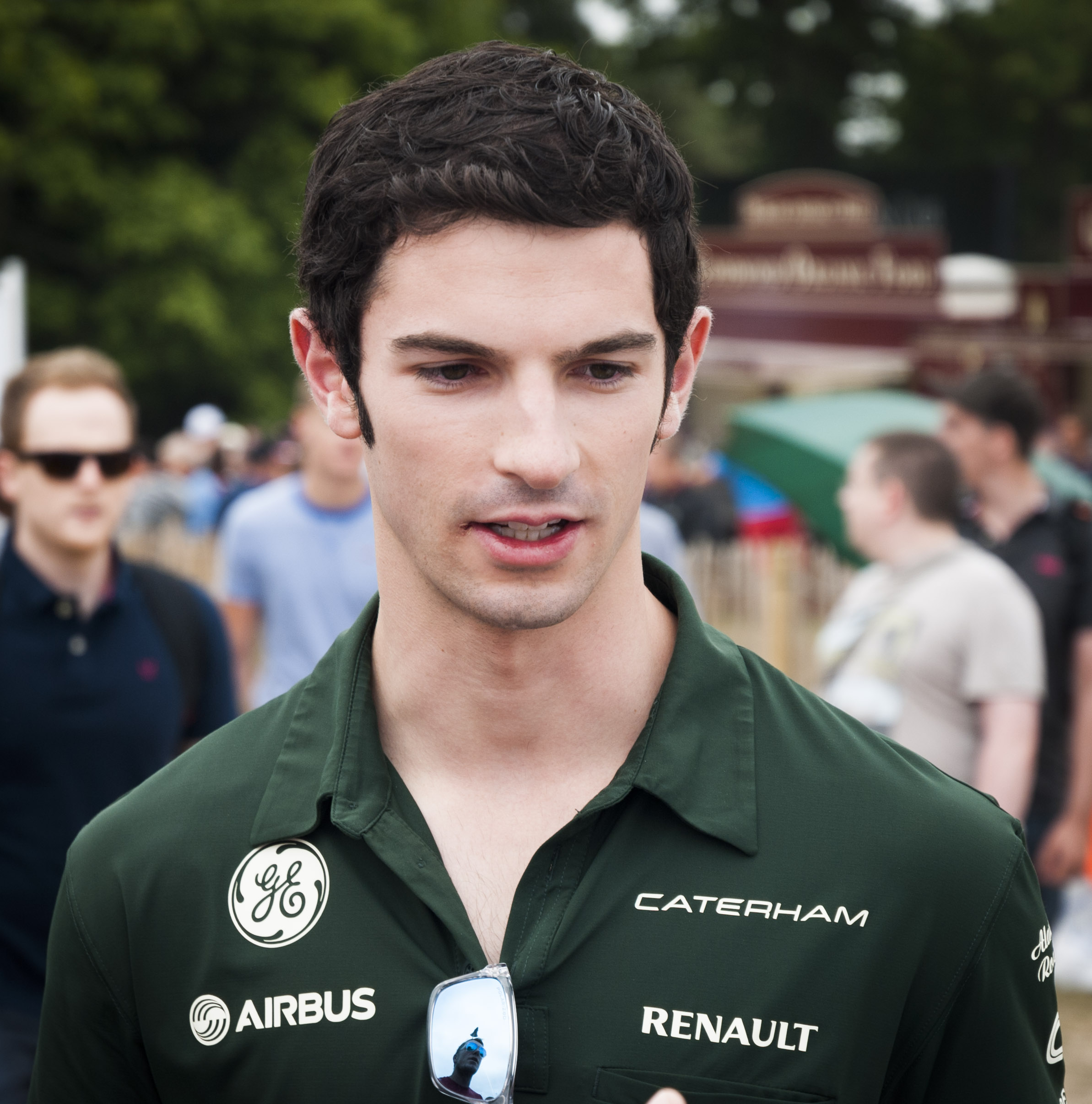
Alexander Rossi (pictured in 2013) had the second pole position of his GP2 Series career.

One 45-minute practice session was held on Thursday before the two races. The session was held on a dry race track upon having dried up from earlier rain. Arthur Pic of Campos Racing lapped fastest with a time of 1:20.556, ahead of Rossi, Pierre Gasly, Vandoorne, Sergio Canamasas (MP Motorsport), Raffaele Marciello (Trident), Richie Stanaway (Status Grand Prix), André Negrão (Arden International), Haryanto and Norman Nato. Evans caused a brief early red flag period when he stopped his car atop a hill entering Massenet corner, and was unable to set a timed lap. Canamasas went onto the Sainte Dévote run-off area, and Marco Sørensen (Carlin) locked his tyres, causing him hit the barrier at Rascasse corner, and reversed out of the turn. Daniël de Jong stopped his car at the Novelle chicane because of a car mechanical failure.

Friday afternoon's qualifying session ran for 30-minutes. Qualifying was divided into two groups of thirteen cars, with odd numbered vehicles in Group A and even numbered cars in Group B. The drivers' fastest lap times determined the starting order for the first race. The driver who won the pole position was awarded four points that went towards the Drivers' and Teams' Championships. Light rain fell as the session started and some drivers elected to equip the super soft tyres to their cars while other competitors chose to utilise wet-weather compounds. Rossi clinched the second pole position of his GP2 Series career with a time of 1:37.019. The achievement ended Vandoorne's run of consecutive pole positions which started at the 2014 Spa-Francorchamps round. He was joined on the grid's front row by Marciello who had the pole until the latter's lap. Marciello pushed hard and narrowly avoided a loss of car control at Massenet's barriers. Pic qualified third and Vandoorne fourth. Rapax's Sergey Sirotkin improved his lap time late on to start from fifth place. He shared the third row with Julián Leal of Carlin who was ahead of Hilmer Motorsport's Nick Yelloly and Jordan King of Racing Engineering. Canamasas and de Jong were ninth and tenth; de Jong slid into the Mirabeau barrier in the closing minutes of qualifying.

Nobuharu Matsushita was the fastest driver not to qualify in the top ten. Gasly in 12th went deep into Sainte Dévote but did not damage his car. Artem Markelov followed in 13th, ahead of Stanaway whose front wing was damaged in a collision with the Mirabeau barrier, requiring him to enter the pit lane for a replacement nose cone. Negrão placed 15th, with Zoël Amberg in 16th who aquaplaned off the circuit because of an oversteer and struck the exit Tabac corner barrier, removing his right-rear wheel. The two were followed by Lynn and Evans; the latter overshot the entry of Sainte Dévote but avoided damaging his vehicle. Sørensen's car briefly launched airborne after mounting the kerbs through the swimming pool complex and qualified in 19th position. René Binder and Johnny Cecotto Jr. started 20th and 21st; Cecotto went onto Mirabeau's run-off area but avoided damaging his car. Nathanaël Berthon qualified 22nd and Haryanto incurred a three-place starting penalty for being unable to slow sufficiently during a yellow flag period in the track's second sector and started from 23rd. Nato, Marlon Stöckinger and Robert Vișoiu were the final qualifiers.

=== Qualifying classification ===
Group A

Final Group A qualifying classification
Pos.	No.	Driver	Team	Time	Grid
1	11	(Italy) Raffaele Marciello	Trident	1:40.357	2
2	5	(Belgium) Stoffel Vandoorne	ART Grand Prix	1:41.124	4
3	3	(Colombia) Julián Leal	Carlin	1:41.655	6
4	7	(United Kingdom) Jordan King	Racing Engineering	1:41.895	8
5	17	(Netherlands) Daniël de Jong	MP Motorsport	1:42.150	10
6	1	(France) Pierre Gasly	DAMS	1:42.248	12
7	23	(New Zealand) Richie Stanaway	Status Grand Prix	1:42.425	14
8	27	(Switzerland) Zoël Amberg	Team Lazarus	1:42.539	16
9	9	(New Zealand) Mitch Evans	Russian Time	1:42.804	18
10	15	(Indonesia) Rio Haryanto	Campos Racing	1:42.913	20
11	25	(Venezuela) Johnny Cecotto Jr.	Hilmer Motorsport	1:43.386	22
12	21	(France) Norman Nato	Arden International	1:44.286	24
13	19	(Romania) Robert Vișoiu	Rapax	1:44.475	26

Group B

Final Group B qualifying classification
Pos.	No.	Driver	Team	Time	Grid
1	8	(United States) Alexander Rossi	Racing Engineering	1:37.019	1
2	14	(France) Arthur Pic	Campos Racing	1:37.617	3
3	18	(Russia) Sergey Sirotkin	Rapax	1:38.391	5
4	24	(United Kingdom) Nick Yelloly	Hilmer Motorsport	1:38.618	7
5	16	(Spain) Sergio Canamasas	MP Motorsport	1:38.691	9
6	6	(Japan) Nobuharu Matsushita	ART Grand Prix	1:39.020	11
7	10	(Russia) Artem Markelov	Russian Time	1:39.073	13
8	20	(Brazil) André Negrão	Arden International	1:39.142	15
9	2	(United Kingdom) Alex Lynn	DAMS	1:39.186	17
10	4	(Denmark) Marco Sørensen	Carlin	1:39.532	19
11	12	(Austria) René Binder	Trident	1:39.539	21
12	26	(France) Nathanaël Berthon	Team Lazarus	1:40.101	23
13	22	(Philippines) Marlon Stöckinger	Status Grand Prix	1:41.503	25

== Races ==
The first race was held over 140 km (87 mi) or 60 minutes (which ever came first) and the regulations required drivers to make one pit stop. The first ten finishers scored points, with two given to the fastest lap holder. The grid for the second race was determined by the finishing order of the first but with the first eight drivers in reverse order of where they finished. It was run for 100 km (62 mi) or 45 minutes (which ever came first) and, in contrast to the first race, drivers were not required to make pit stops. The top eight finishers earned points towards their respective championships.

=== Feature race ===
The weather at the start of the race was sunny and warm with an air temperature of 19 °C (66 °F) and a track temperature of 28 °C (82 °F). The race started at 11:10 Central European Summer Time (UTC+02:00) on 22 May. Matsushita stalled his car on his starting position because of losing oil pressure, and five other drivers stalled soon after, prompting marshals to push them away from the grid. A further delay was caused during the wait for the stalled cars when confusion arose over who started where, and it was later decided to perform another formation lap, shortening the race by one lap. Gasly was deemed to have jumped the start and was required to begin from the pit lane. When the race started 20 minutes later after one extra lap was removed from the race distance, Maricello on the super soft compound tyres made a brisk getaway to move ahead of Rossi around the outside for the lead into Sainte Dévote corner. Further down the field, Amberg damaged his front wing and made a pit stop for repairs at the end of the first lap. Pic maintained third position from Vandoorne, while Stanaway moved from 14th to tenth, while King made up three positions over the same distance. Maricello held a 2.1 second lead over Rossi by the end of lap one because he had the super soft tyres equipped on his car. The first four drivers pulled away from the rest of the field.

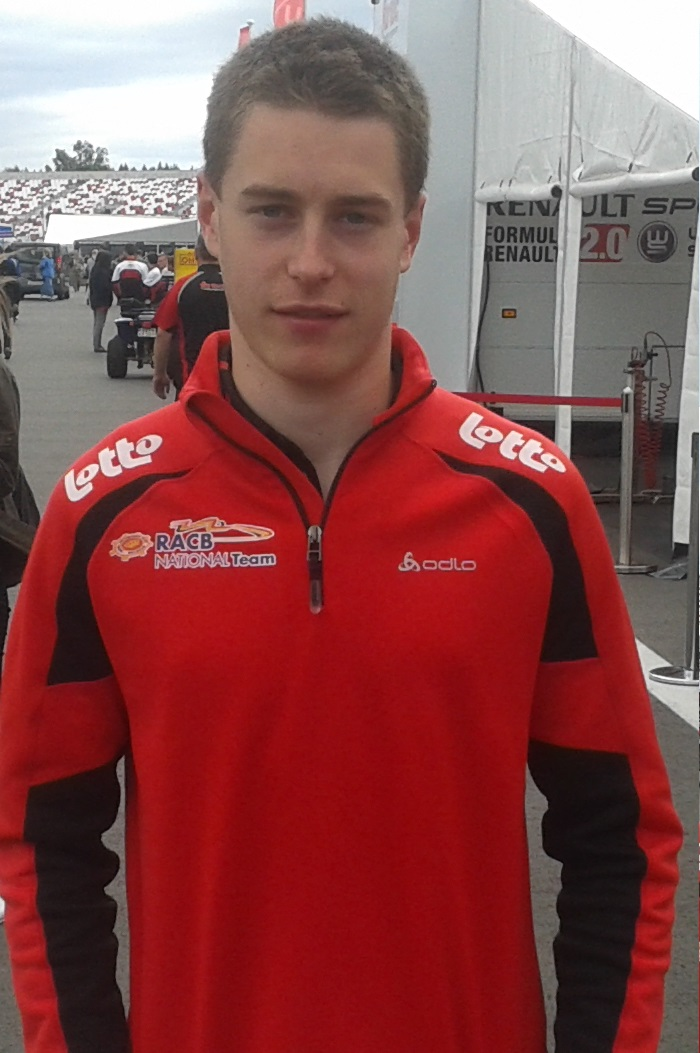
Stoffel Vandoorne (pictured in 2013) won his seventh race of his GP2 Series career.

Maricello's super soft tyres began to degrade quickly, allowing Rossi and Vandoorne to draw closer over the next two laps. Rossi caught Maricello by the start of the sixth lap but the latter remained on the circuit. King, who was delayed by a long queue of vehicles behind him, was the first driver to make a scheduled pit stop on the same lap and rejoined the track in clear air. On lap eight, Matsushita collided heavily with de Jong at the Novelle chicane, causing him to retire and was later penalised with a three-place grid penalty for the sprint race after the stewards judged him to have missed the corner's braking point. De Jong was able to continue. Marciello made his pit stop for new tyres on the next lap, allowing Rossi and Vandoorne to move into first and second and both drivers built an advantage over the rest of the field. Maricello rejoined in 11th, behind Pic, who made his pit stop one lap later. Sørensen was placed into the Casino Hairpin barriers at the apex of the corner by Nato on lap ten, ending his race. Nato incurred a ten-second time penalty, but the safety car was not deployed. Markelov retired from the race in the pit lane with damage to his car after running off the circuit, and drove over a kerb at the exit to the left-hand Louis Chiron corner, launching him airborne into a trackside barrier.

Rossi led Vandoorne by a second who pushed hard to stay with Rossi. Evans attempted to overtake Yelloly leaving the tunnel at the chicane but Yellowly steered into Evans, who was forced to retire on lap 18. The incident necessitated the activation of the virtual safety car (VSC) on the next lap to allow track officials to clear the circuit of debris. Rossi and Vandoorne elected to make pit stops for super soft tyres during the VSC with Vandoorne emerging in the lead since cars were limited to 80 km/h (50 mph). Leal moved into third despite making contact with Sirotkin. At the race's restart, Vandoorne extended his lead over Rossi by 3.4 seconds in one lap. This was the case until Rossi drove two seconds faster on the following lap and was half a second behind Vandoorne by the 23rd lap. Yelloly set the feature race's fastest time on the same lap, completing a circuit in 1:22.314. Vandoorne's and Rossi's releases from their pit stall were investigated by the stewards but chose not to take any further action. A brief second VSC period was deployed when debris was located into Rascasse corner. Canamasas overtook Pic at Sainte Dévote corner to move into fourth at the beginning of the 28th lap.

With ten laps remaining, Rossi radioed his team that his front tyres were degrading, with Vandoorne experiencing the same issue. King quickly closed up to Yelloly and overtook him for ninth place on the 32nd lap. Vandoorne held the lead for the rest of the race and achieved his third consecutive GP2 feature race victory of 2015, and his seventh in the series. He finished six seconds ahead of Rossi who slowed, with Leal third on the road, but was issued with a ten-second time penalty upon being judged by the stewards to have been unsafely released from his pit stall. Hence, Canamasas inherited third-place, ahead of Pic and Sirotkin. Leal, Stanaway, Maricello, King and Yelloly rounded out the top-ten points-scoring finishers. Binder, de Jong, Lynn, Gasly and Vișoiu were the next five finishers, with Haryanto, Berthon, Nato, Stöckinger, Cecotto, Negrão and Amberg the final classified finishers.

==== Feature race classification ====
Drivers who scored championship points are denoted in bold.

Final feature race classification
Pos.	No.	Driver	Team	Laps	Time/Retired	Grid	Points
1	5	(Belgium) **Stoffel Vandoorne**	**ART Grand Prix**	40	58:12.368	4	25
2	8	(United States) **Alexander Rossi**	**Racing Engineering**	40	+6.292	1	22
3	16	(Spain) **Sergio Canamasas**	**MP Motorsport**	40	+16.726	9	15
4	14	(France) **Arthur Pic**	**Campos Racing**	40	+17.813	3	12
5	18	(Russia) **Sergey Sirotkin**	**Rapax**	40	+20.691	5	10
6	3	(Colombia) **Julián Leal**	**Carlin**	40	+25.164	6	8
7	23	(New Zealand) **Richie Stanaway**	**Status Grand Prix**	40	+25.470	14	6
8	11	(Italy) **Raffaele Marciello**	**Trident**	40	+26.803	2	4
9	7	(United Kingdom) **Jordan King**	**Racing Engineering**	40	+31.339	8	2
10	24	(United Kingdom) **Nick Yelloly**	**Hilmer Motorsport**	40	+42.915	7	3
11	12	(Austria) René Binder	Trident	40	+43.837	21	
12	17	(Netherlands) Daniël de Jong	MP Motorsport	40	+45.528	10	
13	2	(United Kingdom) Alex Lynn	DAMS	40	+46.824	17	
14	1	(France) Pierre Gasly	DAMS	40	+47.666	12	
15	19	(Romania) Robert Vișoiu	Rapax	40	+49.290	26	
16	15	(Indonesia) Rio Haryanto	Campos Racing	40	+51.085	20	
17	26	(France) Nathanaël Berthon	Team Lazarus	40	+52.135	23	
18	21	(France) Norman Nato	Arden International	40	+1:02.735	24	
19	22	(Philippines) Marlon Stöckinger	Status Grand Prix	40	+1:07.600	25	
20	25	(Venezuela) Johnny Cecotto Jr.	Hilmer Motorsport	40	+1:07.999	22	
21	20	(Brazil) André Negrão	Arden International	39	+1 Lap	15	
22	27	(Switzerland) Zoël Amberg	Team Lazarus	39	+1 Lap	16	
Ret	9	(New Zealand) Mitch Evans	Russian Time	18	Collision	18	
Ret	10	(Russia) Artem Markelov	Russian Time	12	Accident damage	13	
Ret	4	(Denmark) Marco Sørensen	Carlin	10	Accident	19	
Ret	6	(Japan) Nobuharu Matsushita	ART Grand Prix	7	Collision	11	
Fastest lap: Nick Yelloly (Hilmer Motorsport) — 1:22.314 (on lap 23)

=== Sprint race ===
The second event began at 16:10 local time on 23 May. The weather at the start of the race were cooler than the previous day's event with dark clouds in the sky and a chance of rain. The air temperature was at 17 °C (63 °F) and the track temperature 23 °C (73 °F). All drivers began on the soft compound tyres. Evans did not start the event because his car stopped on the track's halfway section while driving to his starting position. Sørensen stalled in his grid position but was able to start soon after before he was issued with a ten-second time penalty because his mechanics were tending to his car after the 15-second signal was given. Matsushita was required to start from the pit lane because of his collision with de Jong in the feature event. When the race started, pole position starter Maricello made a slow start and was overtaken on the outside by Stanaway into the first corner. Maricello held off Sirotkin, Leal and Canamasas. Rossi damaged the front wing in a collision with the rear of Pic's car but continued. Cecotto squeezed Amberg sideways into a barrier uphill to Massenet corner, forcing the retirement of both cars.

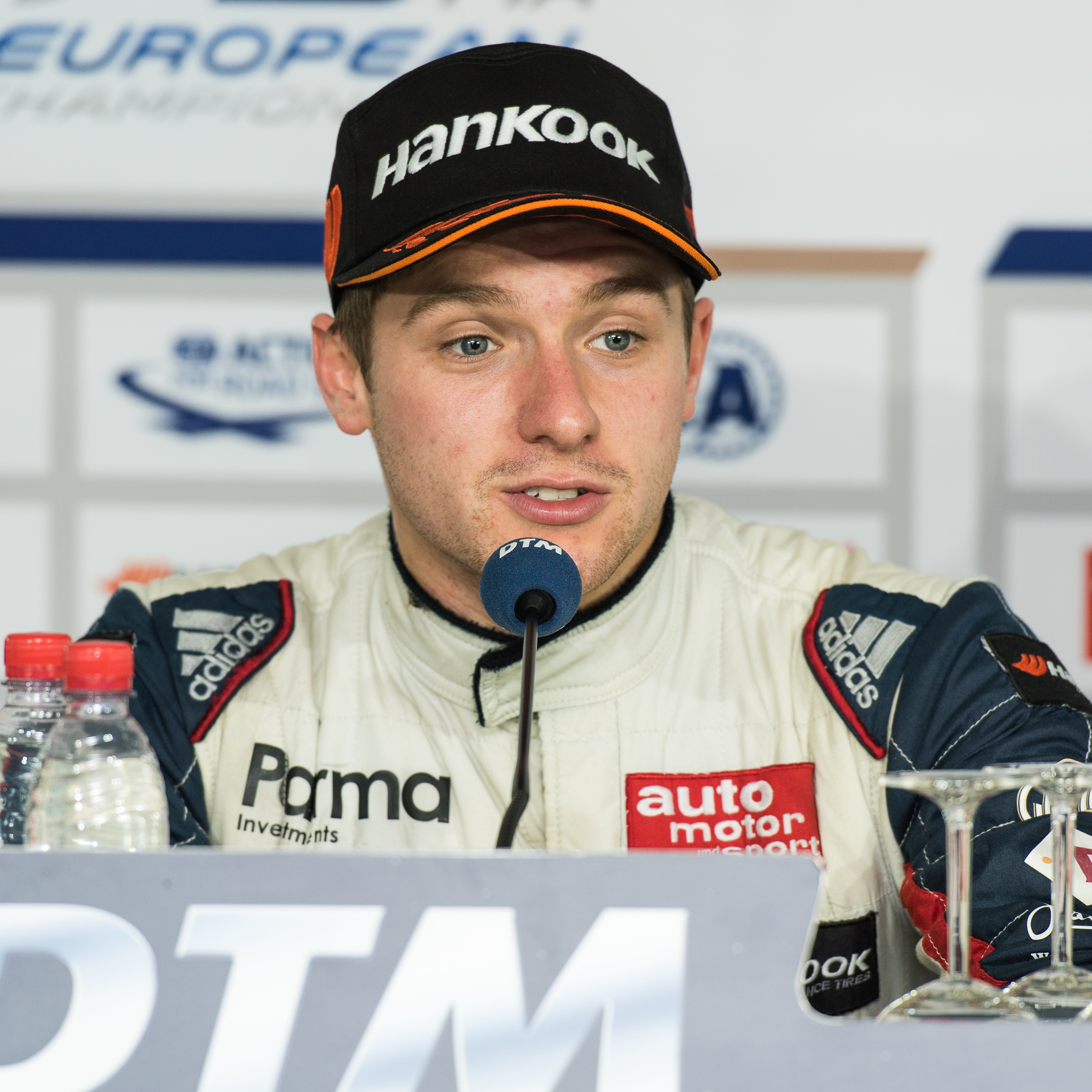
Jordan King (pictured in 2014) went airborne after a collision with Pierre Gasly in the race's late period.

Shortly afterwards Nato, Haryanto and Binder went three abreast at the Casino hairpin which saw Haryanto squeezed wide at the corner's exit by Nato and was unable to leave the turn, causing a brief usage of the VSC to allow the three cars to be extracted from the circuit by a trackside crane. Nato was able to continue but made a pit stop for repairs and was issued with a ten-second time penalty because he was judged to have caused the collision. The race resumed on the second lap with Stanaway leading Maricello and Sirotkin. Stanaway pulled away from the rest of the field. Leal was overtaken for fourth place by Canamasas at Sainte Dévote on the seventh lap's start and narrowly made the corner. Stanaway led the field by three seconds at the race's mid-way point while Maricello was two seconds in front of Sirotkin. Stanaway's team cautioned him about the possibility of tyre degradation if he continued to push hard. Few overtakes took place as the field spread out. Rossi and Vandoorne intentionally fell back from the leaders and both drivers started to record fastest lap times in an effort of earning the accolade of two points for setting the event's fastest lap. Vandoorne temporarily claimed the award with a lap time of 1:21.926, before Nato gained the accolade on the 30th lap with a time of 1:21.886.

King had battled with Gasly for most of the race and continued to apply pressure on Gasly despite not being able to pass him. He became more frustrated at Gasly's blocking manoeuvres and complained that the latter drove straight across the chicane on lap 24. On the following lap, King gained momentum leaving the tunnel and Gasly was slower than the former. King's front-left tyre made contact with the right-rear of the DAMS car, launching him into the air. He drove onto the escape road at high speed and became the race's fourth retirement with heavy damage to his car. King was unhurt. He was transported to the local hospital for a precautionary check-up which found bruising but no serious injuries. Having been behind him for most of the race, Markelov braked later than Binder and passed him on the outside at Sainte Dévote on lap 28, and later passed Berthon for 14th position.

Stanaway drifted at La Rascasse corner after his car's rear gave way and narrowly avoided a collision against a wall on the race's final lap. He regained control of his car and crossed the start/finish line to win the race, having led every lap. Marciello finished second, two seconds behind the race winner and Sirotkin took third. Canamasas secured fourth, and Leal was fifth. Pic, Rossi and Vandoorne filled the remainder of the points-scoring positions and were all separated by 2.5 seconds. Yelloly and Gasly rounded out the top ten. Lynn, de Jong, Vișoiu, Markelov and Berthon followed in the next five places, while Binder, Negrão, Stöckinger, Matushita, Sørensen and Nato were the final classified finishers. The victory was Stanaway's first in the GP2 Series and the maiden triumph for his team Status Grand Prix following its take over of the former Caterham Racing entry. Stanaway's victory was the best success for a New Zealand driver at Monaco since Denny Hulme won the 1967 Monaco Grand Prix.

==== Sprint race classification ====
Drivers who scored championship points are denoted in bold.

Final sprint race classification
Pos.	No.	Driver	Team	Laps	Time/Retired	Grid	Points
1	23	(New Zealand) **Richie Stanaway**	**Status Grand Prix**	30	42:45.918	2	15
2	11	(Italy) **Raffaele Marciello**	**Trident**	30	+2.038	1	12
3	18	(Russia) **Sergey Sirotkin**	**Rapax**	30	+3.207	4	10
4	16	(Spain) **Sergio Canamasas**	**MP Motorsport**	30	+5.698	6	8
5	3	(Colombia) **Julián Leal**	**Carlin**	30	+13.479	3	6
6	14	(France) **Arthur Pic**	**Campos Racing**	30	+20.637	5	4
7	8	(United States) **Alexander Rossi**	**Racing Engineering**	30	+22.119	7	2
8	5	(Belgium) **Stoffel Vandoorne**	**ART Grand Prix**	30	+23.103	8	3
9	24	(United Kingdom) Nick Yelloly	Hilmer Motorsport	30	+33.361	10	
10	1	(France) Pierre Gasly	DAMS	30	+45.367	14	
11	2	(United Kingdom) Alex Lynn	DAMS	30	+46.007	13	
12	17	(Netherlands) Daniël de Jong	MP Motorsport	30	+47.018	12	
13	19	(Romania) Robert Vișoiu	Rapax	30	+47.331	15	
14	10	(Russia) Artem Markelov	Russian Time	30	+47.697	24	
15	26	(France) Nathanaël Berthon	Team Lazarus	30	+50.015	17	
16	12	(Austria) René Binder	Trident	30	+58.315	11	
17	20	(Brazil) André Negrão	Arden International	30	+58.464	21	
18	22	(Philippines) Marlon Stöckinger	Status Grand Prix	30	+59.823	19	
19	6	(Japan) Nobuharu Matsushita	ART Grand Prix	30	+1:00.570	26	
20	4	(Denmark) Marco Sørensen	Carlin	30	+1:08.579	25	
21	21	(France) Norman Nato	Arden International	30	+1:10.989	18	
Ret	7	(United Kingdom) Jordan King	Racing Engineering	24	Collision	9	
Ret	27	(Switzerland) Zoël Amberg	Team Lazarus	0	Collision	22	
Ret	15	(Indonesia) Rio Haryanto	Campos Racing	0	Collision	16	
Ret	25	(Venezuela) Johnny Cecotto Jr.	Hilmer Motorsport	0	Collision	20	
DNS	9	(New Zealand) Mitch Evans	Russian Time	–	Electrics	23	
Fastest lap: Norman Nato (Arden International) — 1:21.886 (on lap 17)

== Post-round ==
The top three drivers of both races appeared on the podium to collect their trophies and at a later press conference. After the first race, Vandoorne said his third victory of the season was a special feeling and that he had had to work hard to achieve the win. He revealed that he was happy to have overtaken Rossi in the pit lane having felt he was slightly faster than him before he made his pit stop and praised his mechanics for installing his car's tyres in a fast time period. Rossi admitted that he was disappointed not to win the event as he was aware that it would be difficult to remain in front of those who had the super soft tyres installed on their cars heading into the first corner but was not worried over the issue because he was aware that they would make early pit stops. Canamasas felt "very happy" to finish third and earning another podium position result in Monaco was "an amazing feeling". He said he was aware that he had to overtake Pic as soon as possible because he knew that Pic had more grip than him.

Stanaway said that it felt quite "surreal" to win in Monaco and that it was the ideal place to take his first series victory. He stated that GP2 was still new to him and it was a "fantastic feeling" to achieve success in his third race weekend. He hoped that he would improve as the season progressed. His team's managing director David Kennedy stated that it was "the best result that you can have in your maiden GP2 season" and praised Stanaway for demonstrating his speed and talent. Marciello said finishing second would serve to bring positive motivation for his team but that they needed reminding that the result came during the shorter sprint race and hoped they would secure a podium finish in Austria's feature event. Sirotkin said that his sprint race went better than the previous day's longer feature event as he felt that he should have a secured a podium finish in that race. The driver stated that the first podium of his GP2 Series career in Monaco was "a great feeling" but stated he should have been battling for a podium position in the season's first two rounds.

The stewards imposed a three-place grid penalty on King for his role in the collision with Gasly, which he took at the season's next race in Austria. He said that it was a "disappointing" conclusion to the race weekend and he and Gasly discussed the incident and the pair had no issue regarding the matter. Gasly said that his team had hoped for a better result in Monaco but the car's amount of performance was not the reason that his team was unable to score points. He further stated that while he was happy with the behaviour of his vehicle he was unfortunate: "I put my head down and fought my way back, but when you start from so far back on the grid in Monaco scoring points is a hopeless task."

Vandoorne's results increased his lead in the Drivers' Championship on 114 points, as Rossi moved to second place, 44 points behind Vandoorne. Haryanto's poor form dropped him to third. Although they scored no points, Evans and Lynn remained in fourth and fifth positions with 28 and 25 points respectively. ART Grand Prix extended its lead over Racing Engineering in the Teams' Championship by two points. Campos Racing remained in third position on 68 points, and moved further away from DAMS in fourth place, while Russian Time were fifth with eight rounds left in the season.

== Standings after the round ==
Drivers' Championship standings

Pos	+/–	Driver	Points
1		(Belgium) Stoffel Vandoorne	114
2	1	(United States) Alexander Rossi	70
3	1	(Indonesia) Rio Haryanto	49
4		(New Zealand) Mitch Evans	28
5		(United Kingdom) Alex Lynn	25

Teams' Championship standings

Pos	+/–	Team	Points
1		(France) ART Grand Prix	121
2		(Spain) Racing Engineering	84
3		(Spain) Campos Racing	68
4		(France) DAMS	41
5		(Russia) Russian Time	34

- Note: Only the top five positions are included for both sets of standings.

Previous round: 2015 Catalunya GP2 Series round	GP2 Series; 2015 season	Next round: 2015 Red Bull Ring GP2 Series round
Previous round: 2014 Monaco GP2 Series round	Monaco GP2 round	Next round: 2016 Monaco GP2 Series round
