= Trident Motorsport =

Motor racing team

(Italy) Trident Motorsport
- Founded: 2006
- Founder(s): Maurizio Salvadori
- Base: Milan, Italy
- Team principal(s): Maurizio Salvadori
- Current series: FIA Formula 2 Championship; FIA Formula 3 Championship; Formula Regional European Championship; Italian F4 Championship
- Former series: GP2 Series; International Formula Master; Auto GP; GP2 Asia Series; GP3 Series; Macau Grand Prix
- Current drivers: Formula 2; 24. (Netherlands) Laurens van Hoepen; 25. (United Kingdom) John Bennett; Formula 3; 4. (Denmark) Noah Strømsted; 5. (Italy) Matteo De Palo; 6. (United Kingdom) Freddie Slater; Formula Regional European Championship; 33. Maximilian Popov; 47. (India) Kai Daryanani; 87. (Serbia) Andrija Kostić (Italy) Italian F4; TBA. (Switzerland) Florentin Hattemer; TBA. (Bulgaria) Lubo Ruykov; TBA. (Czech Republic) Dominik Simek
- Teams' Championships: FIA Formula 3 Championship: 2021
- Drivers' Championships: FIA Formula 3 Championship; 2023: Gabriel Bortoleto; 2024: Leonardo Fornaroli; 2025: Rafael Câmara
- Website: www.tridentmotorsport.com

Trident Motorsport, or simply Trident (formerly known as Trident Racing) is a motor racing team that competes in single-seater formula racing. It was founded in 2006 in order to compete in the GP2 championship, which was Europe's second highest-ranking single-seater formula below Formula One. Trident has its headquarters in Milan, Italy, and its factory in Ossona, in the metropolitan area of Milan.

== Racing history ==
Trident's previous logo

=== GP2 Series ===
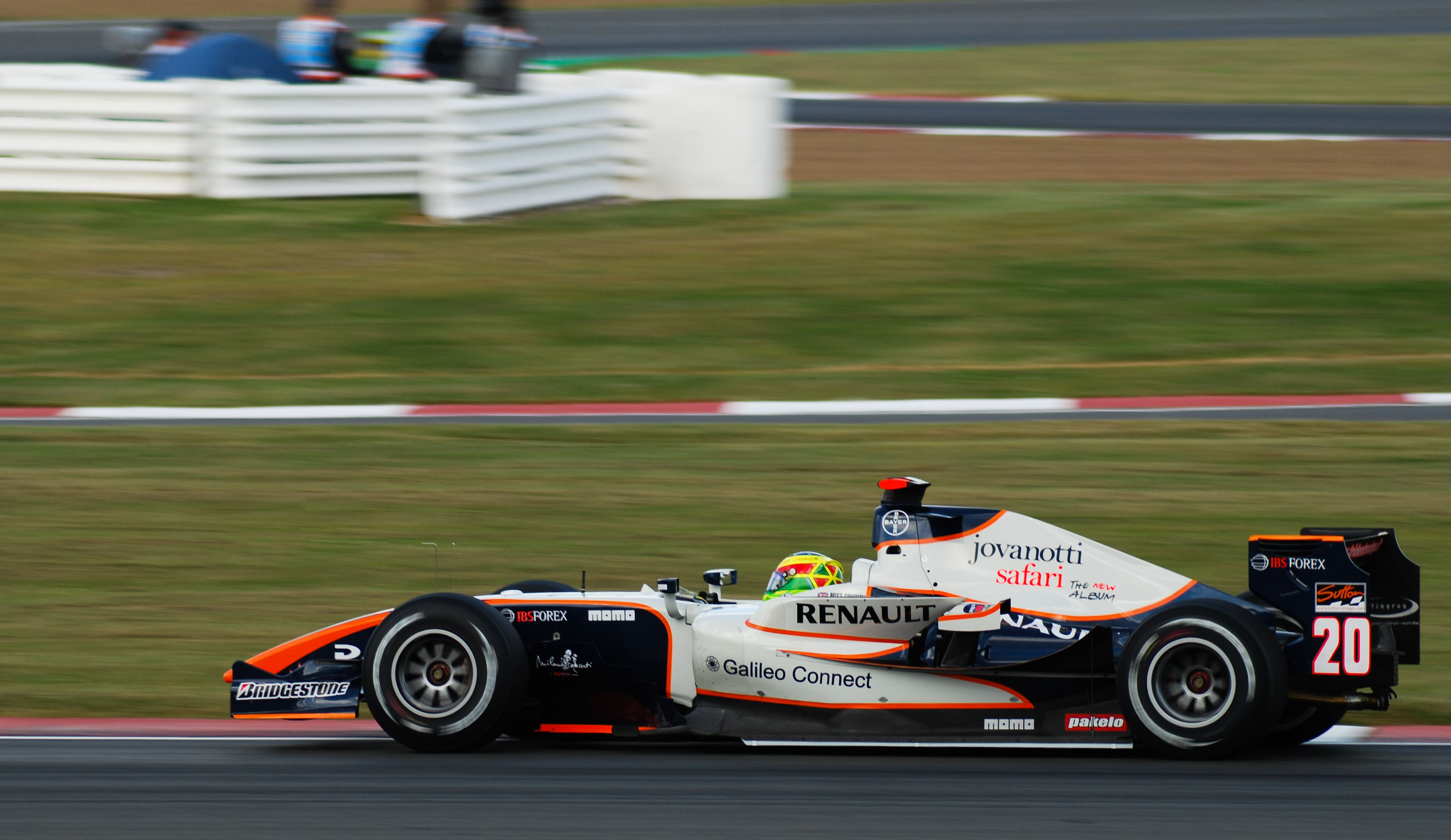
Mike Conway driving for Trident at the Silverstone round of the 2008 GP2 Series season.

After a rapid formation, Trident secured a place on the 2006 GP2 entry list, represented by former Formula One driver Gianmaria Bruni and rookie Andreas Zuber. It was one of three teams that had lodged requests for the thirteenth entry that was made available for that season onwards. GP2's organiser Bruno Michel commented: "Trident Racing put forward a proposal which promised strong sporting and engineering excellence."

Trident's first year of competition was competitive against more experienced opposition. Bruni provided two race wins, together with three pole positions and two fastest race laps, whilst Zuber secured a single race win. In the teams' championship standings, Trident ended the year in sixth place overall. For the 2007 season, Trident chose F3 Euro Series race winner Kohei Hirate from Japan and World Series by Renault front-runner Pastor Maldonado from Venezuela, who suffered a training injury mid-season and was replaced by Ricardo Risatti and then Sergio Hernández. Before his injury, Maldonado secured pole position and the race victory in the series' single race at Monaco, and secured eleventh place in the drivers' championship despite missing the final eight races of the season. His team-mates struggled, however, dropping Trident to tenth in the teams' championship.

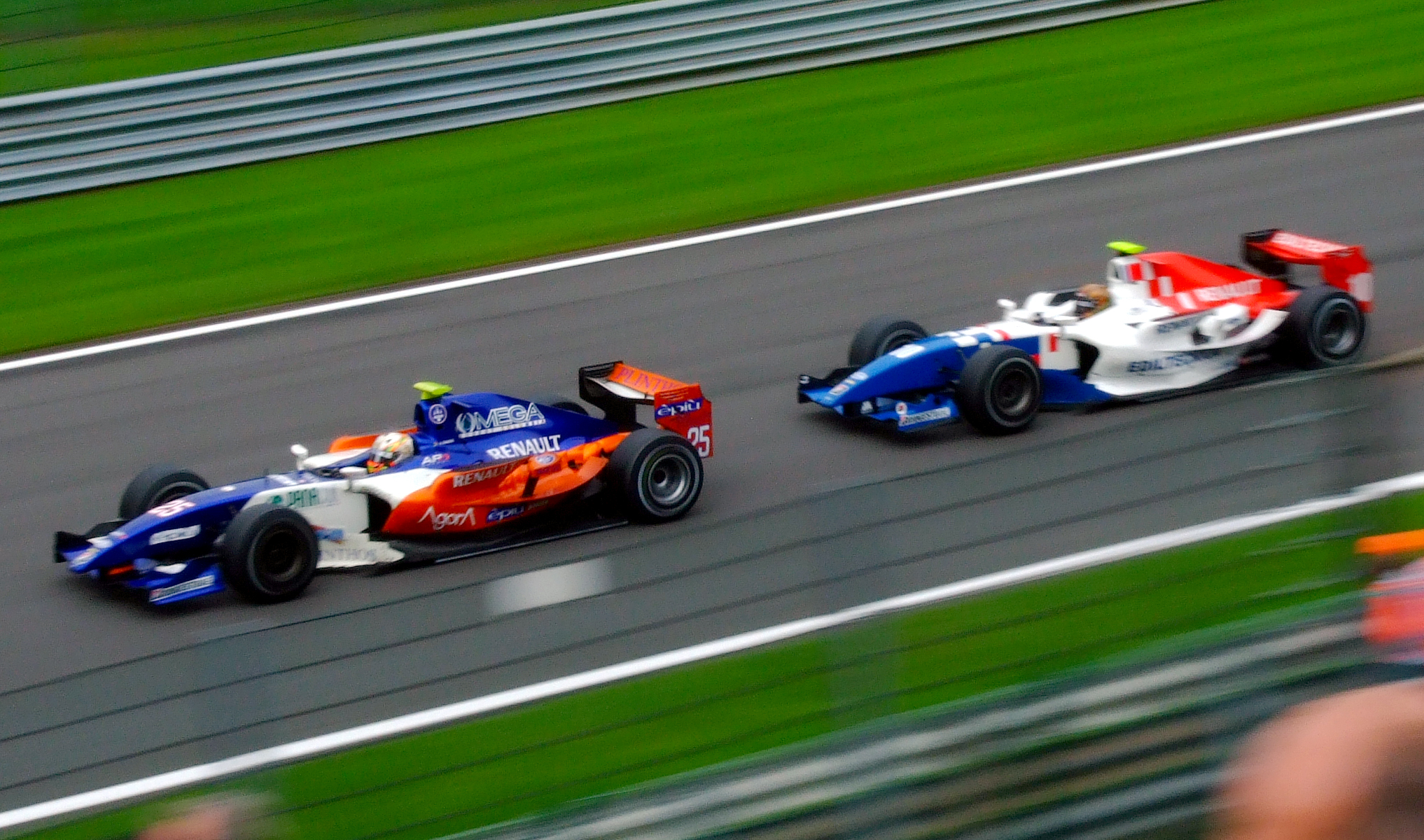
Trident driver Adrian Zaugg leads iSport's Davide Valsecchi at the Spa-Francorchamps round of the 2010 season.

Trident's 2008 drivers were Mike Conway and Ho-Pin Tung. The team's best result again came at Monaco, with Conway leading Tung home for a Trident one-two in the sprint race. Both drivers were unable to replicate this performance elsewhere, but Trident improved to ninth in the teams' championship. For 2009, the team changed its driver line-up to Ricardo Teixeira and Davide Rigon, with Rodolfo González deputising for Rigon for a single round of the championship. The trio scored a mere three points between them, resulting in Trident finishing twelfth and last in the teams' championship. The 2010 season saw a slight improvement as the team improved to eleventh overall; the drivers for the year were Adrian Zaugg and Johnny Cecotto Jr., the latter of whom was replaced first by Edoardo Piscopo and then Federico Leo.

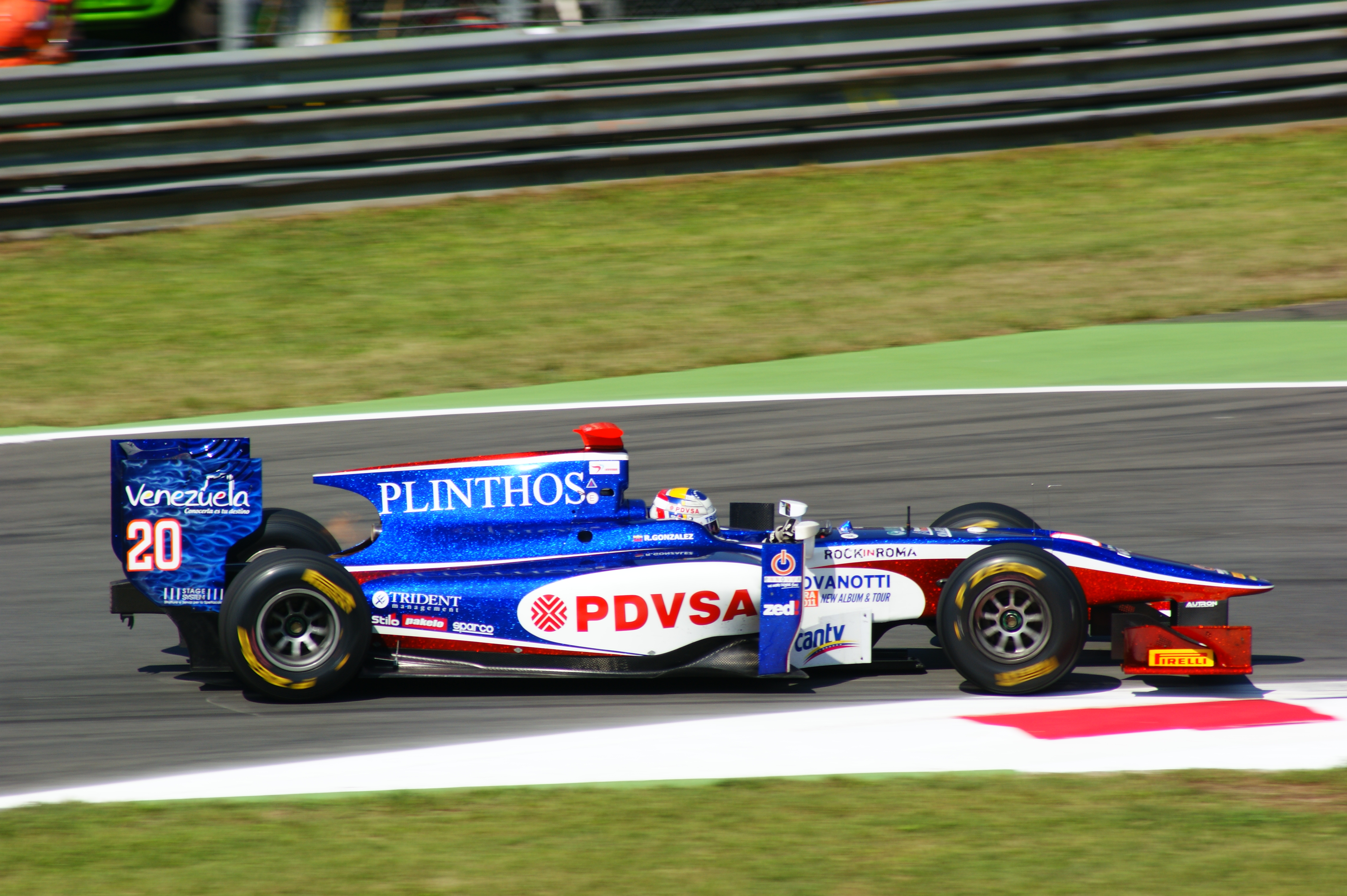
Rodolfo González driving for Trident at the Monza round of the 2011 season.

Trident enjoyed something of a renaissance in 2011, with new lead driver Stefano Coletti winning two races en route to eleventh in the drivers' championship, despite suffering a back injury at the penultimate round of the season at Spa-Francorchamps which saw him ruled out of the finale; he was replaced by Monegasque compatriot Stéphane Richelmi. In the other car, the returning González failed to score. For the 2012 season, Richelmi was retained and joined by Julián Leal: the duo scored 31 points between them under the new scoring system, but Trident slipped to tenth in the teams' championship, having finished eighth the season before.

For the 2015 season, Raffaele Marciello, of the Ferrari Driver Academy, and René Binder joined the team from Racing Engineering and Arden International respectively. The team finished seventh overall.

The team entered 2016 with Philo Paz Armand and Luca Ghiotto being promoted from GP3. After a winless season the previous year, Ghiotto scored a victory at the sprint race in Malaysia bringing them to eighth in the standings.

=== GP2 Asia Series ===
Trident also competed in the GP2 Asia Series from its inception in 2008 to its cancellation in 2011. In the series' inaugural championship, the team fielded Harald Schlegelmilch and Ho-Pin Tung for a total of four points, finishing thirteenth and last in the teams' championship. For the 2008-09 season, Trident employed an unusually high number of seven drivers to share its two race seats: Giacomo Ricci, Alberto Valerio, Frankie Provenzano, Ricardo Teixeira, Chris van der Drift, Adrián Vallés and Davide Rigon all shared driving duties at some stage, propelling Trident to ninth in the teams' championship between them. In the 2009-10 season, the team reduced is roster two four drivers, with gentleman driver Plamen Kralev buying one seat for the entirety of the championship, and the other shared between Johnny Cecotto Jr., Dani Clos and Adrian Zaugg. This campaign was less successful, as the team slipped back to eleventh in the standings. The truncated 2011 season was Trident's best, as lead driver Stefano Coletti put in a strong showing to finish fourth in the drivers' table, with one win, a position replicated by the team in its own championship. In the other car, Rodolfo González failed to score.

=== GP3 Series ===
Trident joined the GP3 Series for its third year of competition in 2012, replacing the departing Barwa Addax team. It became the first GP3 team to intentionally field two drivers instead of the usual three (although several other teams later dropped down to two-car entries for certain rounds), beginning the season with Vicky Piria and Antonio Spavone. For the fourth round of the championship at Silverstone, it expanded briefly to three cars for Giovanni Venturini, but Spavone's ride disappeared thereafter and the team once again returned to a two car set-up. Venturini was the most successful of the Italian trio, finishing on the podium twice and finishing thirteenth in the drivers' championship, in contrast to Piria and Spavone, who did not score. Trident finished ninth and last in the teams' championship.

The team enjoyed an upturn in performance in the following two seasons, with performances from Luca Ghiotto in 2015 and Antonio Fuoco in 2016, allowing them to finish second and third in the respective constructors championships.

In 2018, the team was represented by Giuliano Alesi, Ryan Tveter and Alessio Lorandi. After Lorandi was promoted to Formula 2 prior to the Hungaroring round, David Beckmann was signed as his replacement.

=== FIA Formula 2 Championship ===
In 2018 the team was represented by Haas F1 test drivers Arjun Maini, Santino Ferrucci and Alessio Lorandi who switched from GP3 mid season after Ferrucci was banned for two rounds following a collision with teammate Arjun Maini at Silverstone, then had his contract terminated citing sponsorship issues.

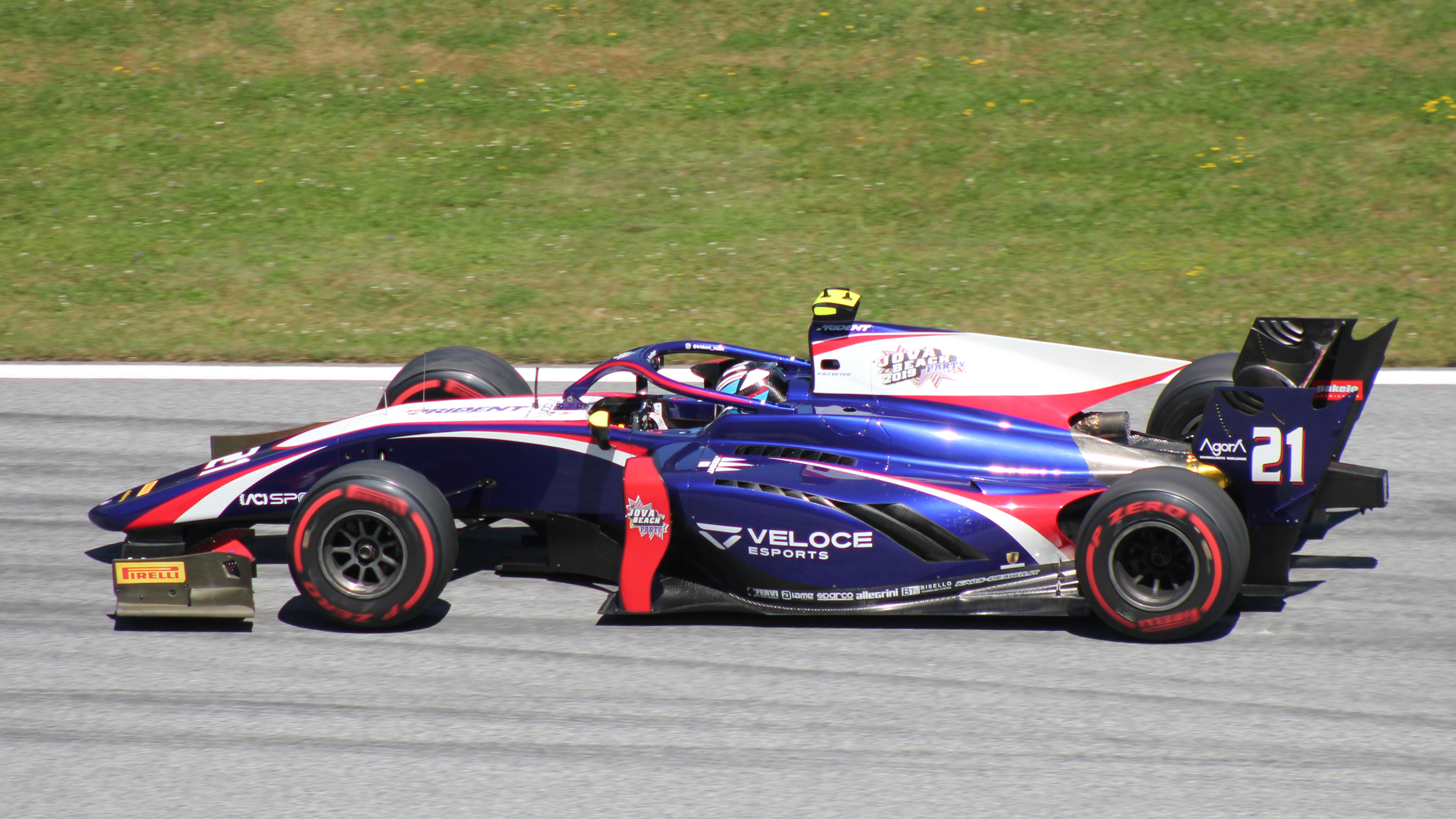
Ryan Tveter driving for Trident during the 2019 Red Bull Ring FIA Formula 2 round

For the 2019 season, the team promoted Giuliano Alesi from their defunct GP3 division. On 11 March 2019, Ralph Boschung was confirmed as his teammate. Ryan Tveter replaced Boschung at the Red Bull Ring before being replaced by Dorian Boccolacci, who had previously raced for Campos, for Silverstone. Boschung returned for Hungary before stepping aside to relieve sponsorship issues at Monza for Giuliano Alesi who ran the sole car. Boschung returned for Sochi before being replaced by Christian Lundgaard at Abu Dhabi.

For the 2020 season, the team hired new Williams development driver Roy Nissany who had not raced in 2019 due to a pre-season testing injury. He was joined by 2019 Euroformula Open Champion Marino Sato who raced for Campos Racing from Spa onwards where he failed to score a point.

Nissany's best result came at Spa-Francorchamps, where he finished eighth in the feature race and battled for the race lead with Dan Ticktum in the sprint race, until the pair collided. He scored five points throughout the season, four more than teammate Sato, who finished eighth in the Mugello Sprint Race. The pair finished 19th and 22nd in the standings respectively, leading to Trident finishing last in the teams' championship.

In 2021, F3 graduate Bent Viscaal partnered with Sato, his best finish was 2nd at the second Monza sprint race bringing Trident their best ever result in F2.

In 2022, Trident would take their first win in Formula 2 with Richard Verschoor in the opening race of the season.

=== FIA Formula 3 Championship ===
In October 2018, Trident was listed among ten teams to compete in the inaugural FIA Formula 3 Championship. Their drivers were Devlin DeFrancesco, Niko Kari, both of whom switched from MP Motorsport after competing with them in the GP3 Series; the latter moved to Formula 2 midway through the 2018 season, and Pedro Piquet, who raced for them in GP3. Piquet finished 5th on 98 points in the championship with a win at the first race at Spa being the highlight of his season. Devlin DeFrancesco finished in 25th with no points with a 9th place at the Red Bull Ring's Race 2 being the closest he got. Niko Kari finished 12th with 36 points and the highlights of his season were a third-place at Catalunya Race 2 and Sochi Race 1.

For the 2020 season, Trident signed ADAC Formula 4 champion Lirim Zendeli who moved from the Sauber Junior Team by Charouz where he finished 18th in 2019. David Beckmann replaced Devlin DeFrancesco ahead of the latter's move to the 2020 Indy Pro 2000 Championship with Andretti Autosport in late June before a race had been run.

In 2021, with drivers Jack Doohan, Clément Novalak and David Schumacher, the team secured its first Teams' Championship in the category.

The team won three consecutive driver's titles in 2023, 2024 and 2025, with Gabriel Bortoleto, Leonardo Fornaroli and Rafael Câmara all taking titles.

=== Macau Grand Prix ===
2019 saw the introduction of the Macau Grand Prix as a non-championship event run to FIA Formula 3 car specifications after the season has ended. The 2019 Macau Grand Prix will be Trident's debut in the race. They are running Olli Caldwell, David Beckmann and Alessio Lorandi meaning they are running a completely changed lineup from the 2019 FIA Formula 3 Championship. The drivers qualified in the middle of the pack with Caldwell qualifying 17th, Beckmann in 19th and Lorandi in 14th. In the qualifying race, Beckmann and Lorandi were able to make it through the Lap 1 incident at Lisboa which got Beckmann 9th and Lorandi 7th with Caldwell being blocked by the incident to finish 23rd. Caldwell retired in the early stages of the Main Race to finish 29th whereas Beckmann retained his starting spot to finish 9th and Lorandi moved up to 5th from 7th.

=== Formula Regional European Championship ===
In November 2021, Trident announced that they would enter the Formula Regional European Championship starting from the 2022 season. The team fielded in 2021 ADAC and 2021 Italian F4 vice-champion Tim Tramnitz, Leonardo Fornaroli, and Roman Bilinski.

In 2025, Trident signed Matteo De Palo, Ruiqi Liu and Nandhavud Bhirombhakdi for the campaign. The team claimed their first win in the series, courtesy of De Palo during the season opener in Misano.

=== Formula 4 ===
In June 2025, Trident announced that they would expand into the Italian F4 Championship starting from the 2026 season, marking their first season competing in the Formula 4 category.

== Current series results ==
=== FIA Formula 2 Championship ===
Year	Chassis	Engine	Tyres	Drivers	Races	Wins	Poles	F. Laps	Podiums	D.C.	Pts	T.C.	Pts
2017	Dallara; GP2/11	Mecachrome; V8108 V8	P	(Malaysia) Nabil Jeffri	22	0	0	0	0	23rd	2	10th	9
2017	Dallara; GP2/11	Mecachrome; V8108 V8	P	(Spain) Sergio Canamasas	8	0	0	0	0	14th	3 (Note: Points scored whilst racing for Trident. Canamasas scored 18 points for other teams.)	10th	9
2017	Dallara; GP2/11	Mecachrome; V8108 V8	P	(Italy) Raffaele Marciello	2	0	0	0	0	29th	0	10th	9
2017	Dallara; GP2/11	Mecachrome; V8108 V8	P	(United Kingdom) Callum Ilott	2	0	0	0	0	26th	0	10th	9
2017	Dallara; GP2/11	Mecachrome; V8108 V8	P	(United States) Santino Ferrucci	10	0	0	0	0	22nd	4	10th	9
2018	Dallara; F2 2018	Mecachrome; V634T V6 t	P	(India) Arjun Maini	23	0	0	0	0	16th	24	10th	37
2018	Dallara; F2 2018	Mecachrome; V634T V6 t	P	(United States) Santino Ferrucci	13	0	0	0	0	19th	7	10th	37
2018	Dallara; F2 2018	Mecachrome; V634T V6 t	P	(Italy) Alessio Lorandi	10	0	0	0	0	20th	6	10th	37
2019	Dallara; F2 2018	Mecachrome; V634T V6 t	P	(France) Giuliano Alesi	22	0	0	0	0	15th	20	10th	23
2019	Dallara; F2 2018	Mecachrome; V634T V6 t	P	(Switzerland) Ralph Boschung	14	0	0	0	0	19th	3	10th	23
2019	Dallara; F2 2018	Mecachrome; V634T V6 t	P	(United States) Ryan Tveter	2	0	0	0	0	27th	0	10th	23
2019	Dallara; F2 2018	Mecachrome; V634T V6 t	P	(France) Dorian Boccolacci	2	0	0	0	0	14th	0 (Note: Points scored whilst racing for Trident. Boccolacci scored 30 points for other teams.)	10th	23
2019	Dallara; F2 2018	Mecachrome; V634T V6 t	P	(Denmark) Christian Lundgaard	2	0	0	0	0	23rd	0	10th	23
2020	Dallara; F2 2018	Mecachrome; V634T V6 t	P	(Israel) Roy Nissany	24	0	0	2	0	19th	5	11th	6
2020	Dallara; F2 2018	Mecachrome; V634T V6 t	P	(Japan) Marino Sato	24	0	0	0	0	22nd	1	11th	6
2021	Dallara; F2 2018	Mecachrome; V634T V6 t	P	(Netherlands) Bent Viscaal	23	0	0	0	2	14th	34	9th	35
2021	Dallara; F2 2018	Mecachrome; V634T V6 t	P	(Japan) Marino Sato	23	0	0	0	0	21st	1	9th	35
2022	Dallara; F2 2018	Mecachrome; V634T V6 t	P	(Netherlands) Richard Verschoor	28	1	0	3	4	12th	103	9th	108
2022	Dallara; F2 2018	Mecachrome; V634T V6 t	P	(Australia) Calan Williams	26	0	0	0	0	23rd	5	9th	108
2022	Dallara; F2 2018	Mecachrome; V634T V6 t	P	(Barbados) Zane Maloney	2	0	0	0	0	26th	0	9th	108
2023	Dallara; F2 2018	Mecachrome; V634T V6 t	P	(Czech Republic) Roman Staněk	26	0	0	0	0	18th	15	10th	43
2023	Dallara; F2 2018	Mecachrome; V634T V6 t	P	(France) Clément Novalak	24	1	0	2	1	17th	28	10th	43
2023	Dallara; F2 2018	Mecachrome; V634T V6 t	P	(Estonia) Paul Aron	2	0	0	0	0	24th	0	10th	43
2024	Dallara; F2 2024	Mecachrome; V634T V6 t	P	(Netherlands) Richard Verschoor	24	1	2	1	4	8th	81 (Note: Points scored whilst racing for Trident. Verschoor scored 25 points for other teams.)	10th	105
2024	Dallara; F2 2024	Mecachrome; V634T V6 t	P	(United States) Max Esterson	4	0	0	0	0	31st	0	10th	105
2024	Dallara; F2 2024	Mecachrome; V634T V6 t	P	(Czech Republic) Roman Staněk	22	1	0	0	1	22nd	14	10th	105
2024	Dallara; F2 2024	Mecachrome; V634T V6 t	P	(Australia) Christian Mansell	6	0	0	0	0	25th	10	10th	105
2025	Dallara; F2 2024	Mecachrome; V634T V6 t	P	(France) Sami Meguetounif	21	0	0	0	0	21st	2	11th	2
2025	Dallara; F2 2024	Mecachrome; V634T V6 t	P	(Netherlands) Laurens van Hoepen	5	0	0	0	0	25th	0	11th	2
2025	Dallara; F2 2024	Mecachrome; V634T V6 t	P	(United States) Max Esterson	21	0	0	0	0	23rd	0	11th	2
2025	Dallara; F2 2024	Mecachrome; V634T V6 t	P	(Norway) Martinius Stenshorne	2	0	0	0	0	20th	0 (Note: Points scored whilst racing for Trident. Stenshorne scored 2 points for other teams.)	11th	2
2025	Dallara; F2 2024	Mecachrome; V634T V6 t	P	(Australia) James Wharton	2	0	0	0	0	27th	0	11th	2
2025	Dallara; F2 2024	Mecachrome; V634T V6 t	P	(Thailand) Tasanapol Inthraphuvasak	2	0	0	0	0	26th	0	11th	2
2026	Dallara; F2 2024	Mecachrome; V634T V6 t	P	(Netherlands) Laurens van Hoepen	25	0	1	0	5	10th	90	7th	128*
2026	Dallara; F2 2024	Mecachrome; V634T V6 t	P	(United Kingdom) John Bennett	25	1	0	1	2	14th	38	7th	128*

* Season still in progress.

==== In detail ====
(key)

Year	Drivers	1	2	3	4	5	6	7	8	9	10	11	12	13	14	15	16	17	18	19	20	21	22	23	24	25	26	27	28	29	T.C.	Points
2017		BHR; FEA	BHR; SPR	CAT; FEA	CAT; SPR	MON; FEA	MON; SPR	BAK; FEA	BAK; SPR	RBR; FEA	RBR; SPR	SIL; FEA	SIL; SPR	HUN; FEA	HUN; SPR	SPA; FEA	SPA; SPR	MNZ; FEA	MNZ; SPR	JER; FEA	JER; SPR	YAS; FEA	YAS; SPR								10th	9
2017	(Malaysia) Nabil Jeffri	19	16	18	18	14	11	Ret	17	18	12	15	18	12	15	11	15	12	17	9	15	Ret	16								10th	9
2017	(Spain) Sergio Canamasas	14	11	Ret	11	10	17	9	15																						10th	9
2017	(Italy) Raffaele Marciello									19	Ret																				10th	9
2017	(United Kingdom) Callum Ilott											19	14																		10th	9
2017	(United States) Santino Ferrucci													9	14	9	10	Ret	14	Ret	13	14	15								10th	9
2018		BHR; FEA	BHR; SPR	BAK; FEA	BAK; SPR	CAT; FEA	CAT; SPR	MON; FEA	MON; SPR	LEC; FEA	LEC; SPR	RBR; FEA	RBR; SPR	SIL; FEA	SIL; SPR	HUN; FEA	HUN; SPR	SPA; FEA	SPA; SPR	MNZ; FEA	MNZ; SPR	SOC; FEA	SOC; SPR	YAS; FEA	YAS; SPR						10th	37
2018	(India) Arjun Maini	15	14	Ret	5	Ret	13	5	5	10	13	14	10	14	13	12	14	14	8	Ret	9	15	15	Ret	DNS						10th	37
2018	(United States) Santino Ferrucci	14	20	11	6	DNS	11	13	12†	13	9	10	7	16	DSQ																10th	37
2018	(Italy) Alessio Lorandi															14	Ret	13	15	15	12	7	Ret	13	14						10th	37
2019		BHR; FEA	BHR; SPR	BAK; FEA	BAK; SPR	CAT; FEA	CAT; SPR	MON; FEA	MON; SPR	LEC; FEA	LEC; SPR	RBR; FEA	RBR; SPR	SIL; FEA	SIL; SPR	HUN; FEA	HUN; SPR	SPA; FEA	SPA; SPR	MNZ; FEA	MNZ; SPR	SOC; FEA	SOC; SPR	YAS; FEA	YAS; SPR						10th	23
2019	(France) Giuliano Alesi	12	DSQ	Ret	Ret	Ret	16	11	Ret	10	14	13	Ret	17	Ret	13	12	C	C	7	7	13	8	8	5						10th	23
2019	(Switzerland) Ralph Boschung	11	14	12	Ret	10	10	9	Ret	Ret	15					18†	18	C	C			14	12								10th	23
2019	(United States) Ryan Tveter											15	16																		10th	23
2019	(France) Dorian Boccolacci													Ret	14																10th	23
2019	(Denmark) Christian Lundgaard																							14	12						10th	23
2020		RBR; FEA	RBR; SPR	RBR; FEA	RBR; SPR	HUN; FEA	HUN; SPR	SIL; FEA	SIL; SPR	SIL; FEA	SIL; SPR	CAT; FEA	CAT; SPR	SPA; FEA	SPA; SPR	MNZ; FEA	MNZ; SPR	MUG; FEA	MUG; SPR	SOC; FEA	SOC; SPR	BHR; FEA	BHR; SPR	BHR; FEA	BHR; SPR						11th	6
2020	(Israel) Roy Nissany	10	12	15^{F}	18^{F}	Ret	17	Ret	16	18	15	Ret	12	8	Ret	19	10	15	10	Ret	19	15	9	20	15						11th	6
2020	(Japan) Marino Sato	Ret	17	16	Ret	Ret	20	20	12	17	17	15	21	14	Ret	20	13	14	8	13	15	20	11	17	16						11th	6
2021		BHR; SP1	BHR; SP2	BHR; FEA	MON; SP1	MON; SP2	MON; FEA	BAK; SP1	BAK; SP2	BAK; FEA	SIL; SP1	SIL; SP2	SIL; FEA	MNZ; SP1	MNZ; SP2	MNZ; FEA	SOC; SP1	SOC; SP2	SOC; FEA	JED; SP1	JED; SP2	JED; FEA	YAS; SP1	YAS; SP2	YAS; FEA						9th	35
2021	(Netherlands) Bent Viscaal	13	12	17	14	11	11	10	4	17	16	Ret	13	7	2	15†	Ret	C	Ret	9	2	12	13	10	12						9th	35
2021	(Japan) Marino Sato	15	8	14	19†	Ret	14	18	13	15	NC	16	19	NC	20	Ret	14	C	14	Ret	13	18	19	16	17						9th	35
2022		BHR; SPR	BHR; FEA	JED; SPR	JED; FEA	IMO; SPR	IMO; FEA	CAT; SPR	CAT; FEA	MON; SPR	MON; FEA	BAK; SPR	BAK; FEA	SIL; SPR	SIL; FEA	RBR; SPR	RBR; FEA	LEC; SPR	LEC; FEA	HUN; SPR	HUN; FEA	SPA; SPR	SPA; FEA	ZAN; SPR	ZAN; FEA	MNZ; SPR	MNZ; FEA	YAS; SPR	YAS; FEA		9th	108
2022	(Netherlands) Richard Verschoor	1	Ret	5	2	13	14	11	18	13	12^{F}	20†	5	10	14	6	DSQ	NC	17†	18^{F}	8	5	4	7	2	8	9^{F}	2	7		9th	108
2022	(Australia) Calan Williams	15	18†	4	13	14	15	16	11	14	16†	16†	16	17	16	14	15	13	11	11	16	16	16	18	11	14	Ret				9th	108
2022	(Barbados) Zane Maloney																											15	16		9th	108
2023		BHR; SPR	BHR; FEA	JED; SPR	JED; FEA	ALB; SPR	ALB; FEA	BAK; SPR	BAK; FEA	MCO; SPR	MCO; FEA	CAT; SPR	CAT; FEA	RBR; SPR	RBR; FEA	SIL; SPR	SIL; FEA	HUN; SPR	HUN; FEA	SPA; SPR	SPA; FEA	ZAN; SPR	ZAN; FEA	MNZ; SPR	MNZ; FEA	YAS; SPR	YAS; FEA				10th	43
2023	(Czech Republic) Roman Staněk	13	Ret	17	14	16	14	8	17	12	7	13	12	5	Ret	15	Ret	16	14	15	9	14	11	8	10	11	12				10th	43
2023	(France) Clément Novalak	16	13	15	16	11	11	7	16	17	17	11	21^{F}	DSQ	13	17	12	Ret	Ret	17	13	8	1^{F}	10	Ret						10th	43
2023	(Estonia) Paul Aron																									16	18				10th	43
2024		BHR; SPR	BHR; FEA	JED; SPR	JED; FEA	ALB; SPR	ALB; FEA	IMO; SPR	IMO; FEA	MCO; SPR	MCO; FEA	CAT; SPR	CAT; FEA	RBR; SPR	RBR; FEA	SIL; SPR	SIL; FEA	HUN; SPR	HUN; FEA	SPA; SPR	SPA; FEA	MNZ; SPR	MNZ; FEA	BAK; SPR	BAK; FEA	LUS; SPR	LUS; FEA	YAS; SPR	YAS; FEA		10th	105
2024	(Netherlands) Richard Verschoor	10	14	DSQ	8	Ret	6	7	10	16	Ret^{P}	13	18†	20	Ret	11	13	DSQ	3	3	5	14	3	17^{F}	1^{P}						10th	105
2024	(United States) Max Esterson																									14	18	14	17		10th	105
2024	(Czech Republic) Roman Staněk	Ret	13	DSQ	Ret	1	15	Ret	18	6	16	22	17	21	18	8	18	15	11	20	14	15	17								10th	105
2024	(Australia) Christian Mansell																							8	10	15	6	16	16		10th	105
2025		ALB; SPR	ALB; FEA	BHR; SPR	BHR; FEA	JED; SPR	JED; FEA	IMO; SPR	IMO; FEA	MCO; SPR	MCO; FEA	CAT; SPR	CAT; FEA	RBR; SPR	RBR; FEA	SIL; SPR	SIL; FEA	SPA; SPR	SPA; FEA	HUN; SPR	HUN; FEA	MNZ; SPR	MNZ; FEA	BAK; SPR	BAK; FEA	LUS; SPR	LUS; FEA	YAS; SPR	YAS; FEA		11th	2
2025	(France) Sami Meguetounif	Ret	C	13	15	16	Ret	21	10	16	12	9	12	Ret	10	13	18	18†	15	17	14	Ret	Ret								11th	2
2025	(Netherlands) Laurens van Hoepen																							17	17	19	18	14	DNS		11th	2
2025	(United States) Max Esterson	Ret	C	Ret	21	18	18	17	19	13	Ret	19	14	10	15	21	13	14	16	19	19	Ret	15								11th	2
2025	(Norway) Martinius Stenshorne																							Ret	Ret						11th	2
2025	(Australia) James Wharton																									Ret	19				11th	2
2025	(Thailand) Tasanapol Inthraphuvasak																											18	17		11th	2
2026		ALB; SPR	ALB; FEA	MIA; SPR	MIA; FEA	MTL; SPR	MTL; FEA	MCO; SPR	MCO; FEA	CAT; SPR	CAT; FEA	RBR; SPR	RBR; FEA	SIL; SPR	SIL; FEA	SPA; SPR	SPA; FEA	HUN; SPR	HUN; FEA	MNZ; SPR	MNZ; FEA	MAD; SPR	MAD; FEA	BAK; SPR	BAK; FE1	BAK; FE2	LUS; SPR	LUS; FEA	YAS; SPR	YAS; FEA	7th	128*
2026	(Netherlands) Laurens van Hoepen	7	3	2	11	4	Ret^{P}	19	12	19	5	15	8	14	17	10	Ret	3	4	8	12	3	12	2	Ret	5					7th	128*
2026	(United Kingdom) John Bennett	15	18	13	14	Ret	Ret	20	18	13	7^{F}	1	11	Ret	11	Ret	15	10	10	2	4	Ret	Ret	10	Ret	Ret					7th	128*

* Season still in progress.

=== FIA Formula 3 Championship ===
Year	Chassis	Engine	Tyres	Drivers	Races	Wins	Poles	F. Laps	Podiums	D.C.	Pts	T.C.	Pts
2019	Dallara; F3 2019	Mecachrome; V634 V6	P	(Canada) Devlin DeFrancesco	16	0	0	0	0	25th	0	4th	134
2019	Dallara; F3 2019	Mecachrome; V634 V6	P	(Brazil) Pedro Piquet	16	1	0	1	3	5th	98	4th	134
2019	Dallara; F3 2019	Mecachrome; V634 V6	P	(Finland) Niko Kari	16	0	0	0	2	12th	36	4th	134
2020	Dallara; F3 2019	Mecachrome; V634 V6	P	(Germany) Lirim Zendeli	18	1	2	1	3	8th	104	2nd	261.5
2020	Dallara; F3 2019	Mecachrome; V634 V6	P	(Germany) David Beckmann	18	2	0	0	6	6th	139.5	2nd	261.5
2020	Dallara; F3 2019	Mecachrome; V634 V6	P	(United Kingdom) Olli Caldwell	18	0	0	0	0	16th	18	2nd	261.5
2021	Dallara; F3 2019	Mecachrome; V634 V6	P	(Australia) Jack Doohan	20	4	2	1	7	**2nd**	**179**	1st	381
2021	Dallara; F3 2019	Mecachrome; V634 V6	P	(France) Clément Novalak	20	0	0	2	4	**3rd**	**147**	1st	381
2021	Dallara; F3 2019	Mecachrome; V634 V6	P	(Germany) David Schumacher	20	1	0	0	2	11th	55	1st	381
2022	Dallara; F3 2019	Mecachrome; V634 V6	P	(United Kingdom) Jonny Edgar	14	0	0	2	0	12th	46	2nd	301
2022	Dallara; F3 2019	Mecachrome; V634 V6	P	(Denmark) Oliver Rasmussen	4	0	0	0	0	22nd	4	2nd	301
2022	Dallara; F3 2019	Mecachrome; V634 V6	P	(Czech Republic) Roman Staněk	18	1	1	2	4	5th	117	2nd	301
2022	Dallara; F3 2019	Mecachrome; V634 V6	P	(Barbados) Zane Maloney	18	3	2	3	4	**2nd**	**134**	2nd	301
2023	Dallara; F3 2019	Mecachrome; V634 V6	P	(Italy) Leonardo Fornaroli	18	0	1	0	3	11th	69	2nd	308
2023	Dallara; F3 2019	Mecachrome; V634 V6	P	(Brazil) Gabriel Bortoleto	18	2	1	3	6	**1st**	**164**	2nd	308
2023	Dallara; F3 2019	Mecachrome; V634 V6	P	(Germany) Oliver Goethe	18	1	1	1	2	8th	75	2nd	308
2024	Dallara; F3 2019	Mecachrome; V634 V6	P	(Italy) Leonardo Fornaroli	20	0	2	2	7	**1st**	**153**	2nd	281
2024	Dallara; F3 2019	Mecachrome; V634 V6	P	(France) Sami Meguetounif	20	2	0	1	2	8th	84	2nd	281
2024	Dallara; F3 2019	Mecachrome; V634 V6	P	(Mexico) Santiago Ramos	20	0	1	0	1	16th	44	2nd	281
2025	Dallara; F3 2025	Mecachrome; V634 V6	P	(Denmark) Noah Strømsted	19	1	0	4	3	6th	84	2nd	303
2025	Dallara; F3 2025	Mecachrome; V634 V6	P	(Brazil) Rafael Câmara	19	4	5	4	5	**1st**	**166**	2nd	303
2025	Dallara; F3 2025	Mecachrome; V634 V6	P	(Austria) Charlie Wurz	19	0	0	0	2	13th	53	2nd	303
2026	Dallara; F3 2025	Mecachrome; V634 V6	P	(Denmark) Noah Strømsted	19	1	0	0	1	10th	65	2nd	217
2026	Dallara; F3 2025	Mecachrome; V634 V6	P	(United Kingdom) Freddie Slater	19	1	3	0	8	**2nd**	**145**	2nd	217
2026	Dallara; F3 2025	Mecachrome; V634 V6	P	(Italy) Matteo De Palo	19	0	0	1	0	24th	7	2nd	217

* Season still in progress.

==== In detail ====
(key)

Year	Drivers	1	2	3	4	5	6	7	8	9	10	11	12	13	14	15	16	17	18	19	20	21	T.C.	Points
2019		CAT; FEA	CAT; SPR	LEC; FEA	LEC; SPR	RBR; FEA	RBR; SPR	SIL; FEA	SIL; SPR	HUN; FEA	HUN; SPR	SPA; FEA	SPA; SPR	MNZ; FEA	MNZ; SPR	SOC; FEA	SOC; SPR						4th	134
2019	(Canada) Devlin DeFrancesco	23	20	21†	21	17	9	27	17	12	11	29	Ret	12	16	23	12						4th	134
2019	(Brazil) Pedro Piquet	26	16	3	2	6	15	6	27†	Ret	27	1^{F}	6	5	5	6	Ret						4th	134
2019	(Finland) Niko Kari	8	3	18	24†	11	8	18	19	14	12	19	Ret	Ret	15	3	5						4th	134
2020		RBR; FEA	RBR; SPR	RBR; FEA	RBR; SPR	HUN; FEA	HUN; SPR	SIL; FEA	SIL; SPR	SIL; FEA	SIL; SPR	CAT; FEA	CAT; SPR	SPA; FEA	SPA; SPR	MNZ; FEA	MNZ; SPR	MUG; FEA	MUG; SPR				2nd	261.5
2020	(Germany) Lirim Zendeli	5	5	2	10	Ret	16	13	11	9	2	12	16	1^{P}	8	7	4	4^{P F}	Ret				2nd	261.5
2020	(Germany) David Beckmann	7	4	3	3	10	1	9	1	5	4	5	9	3	9	4	Ret	8	2				2nd	261.5
2020	(United Kingdom) Olli Caldwell	20	19	5	6	21	18	Ret	26	21	22	20	Ret	7	11	Ret	9	17	16				2nd	261.5
2021		CAT; SP1	CAT; SP2	CAT; FEA	LEC; SP1	LEC; SP2	LEC; FEA	RBR; SP1	RBR; SP2	RBR; FEA	HUN; SP1	HUN; SP2	HUN; FEA	SPA; SP1	SPA; SP2	SPA; FEA	ZAN; SP1	ZAN; SP2	ZAN; FEA	SOC; SP1	SOC; SP2	SOC; FEA	1st	381
2021	(Australia) Jack Doohan	17	8	2	7^{F}	5	1	3	7	27†	9	13	3	12	1	1^{P}	6	18	4	15	C	1^{P}	1st	381
2021	(France) Clément Novalak	2	4	6	5	6	5	Ret	13	Ret	4	8	5	7	5^{F}	5	11	2	2	4^{F}	C	3	1st	381
2021	(Germany) David Schumacher	11	Ret	12	16	11	27	12	1	11	8	6	4	11	2	9	14	5	30†	14	C	15	1st	381
2022		BHR; SPR	BHR; FEA	IMO; SPR	IMO; FEA	CAT; SPR	CAT; FEA	SIL; SPR	SIL; FEA	RBR; SPR	RBR; FEA	HUN; SPR	HUN; FEA	SPA; SPR	SPA; FEA	ZAN; SPR	ZAN; FEA	MNZ; SPR	MNZ; FEA				2nd	301
2022	(United Kingdom) Jonny Edgar	13	11					15	8	7	21	13	24	4^{F}	5	4	9	5	4^{F}				2nd	301
2022	(Denmark) Oliver Rasmussen			7	Ret	16	14																2nd	301
2022	(Czech Republic) Roman Staněk	24	22^{F}	4	1^{F}	8	2^{P}	6	Ret	5	11	9	12	2	2	10	4	12	6				2nd	301
2022	(Barbados) Zane Maloney	4^{F}	Ret	6	Ret^{P}	21	13	7	11	Ret	5	10	2	Ret	1^{F}	17	1^{P F}	4	1				2nd	301
2023		BHR; SPR	BHR; FEA	ALB; SPR	ALB; FEA	MCO; SPR	MCO; FEA	CAT; SPR	CAT; FEA	RBR; SPR	RBR; FEA	SIL; SPR	SIL; FEA	HUN; SPR	HUN; FEA	SPA; SPR	SPA; FEA	MNZ; SPR	MNZ; FEA				2nd	308
2023	(Italy) Leonardo Fornaroli	8	27	7	4	2	24	3	NC	15	10	7	2^{P}	13	9	9	14	8	15				2nd	308
2023	(Brazil) Gabriel Bortoleto	19	1^{F}	6	1^{P}	6	5	4	4	10	2	2	6	2^{F}	7	Ret	11	2	5^{F}				2nd	308
2023	(Germany) Oliver Goethe	6	2	Ret	22	17	13	11	16	26	11	17	1	5	4	Ret	Ret	5^{F}	Ret^{P}				2nd	308
2024		BHR; SPR	BHR; FEA	ALB; SPR	ALB; FEA	IMO; SPR	IMO; FEA	MCO; SPR	MCO; FEA	CAT; SPR	CAT; FEA	RBR; SPR	RBR; FEA	SIL; SPR	SIL; FEA	HUN; SPR	HUN; FEA	SPA; SPR	SPA; FEA	MNZ; SPR	MNZ; FEA		2nd	281
2024	(Italy) Leonardo Fornaroli	3	7	9	2^{P}	11	3	9	5	7^{F}	3	12	9	10	7	7	3	9	3	8^{F}	2^{P}		2nd	281
2024	(France) Sami Meguetounif	10	4	17	12	Ret	1	22†	Ret	Ret	15	10	20	8	12	10	25^{F}	27	5	5	1		2nd	281
2024	(Mexico) Santiago Ramos	21	5	24	25	10	8^{P}	15	14	21	10	24	13	19	16	28	5	8	8	2	18		2nd	281
2025		ALB; SPR	ALB; FEA	BHR; SPR	BHR; FEA	IMO; SPR	IMO; FEA	MCO; SPR	MCO; FEA	CAT; SPR	CAT; FEA	RBR; SPR	RBR; FEA	SIL; SPR	SIL; FEA	SPA; SPR	SPA; FEA	HUN; SPR	HUN; FEA	MNZ; SPR	MNZ; FEA		2nd	303
2025	(Denmark) Noah Strømsted	Ret	2	10	6	6^{F}	2^{F}	Ret	18	Ret^{F}	8	20	7	13	28	1^{F}	C	17	12	8	6		2nd	303
2025	(Brazil) Rafael Câmara	Ret	1^{P F}	12	1^{P F}	11	3^{P}	7	Ret	Ret	1^{P F}	9	5	8	22	5	C	8	1^{P}	25^{F}	5		2nd	303
2025	(Austria) Charlie Wurz	Ret	6	9	11	23	16	6	Ret	14	13	Ret	6	9	16	3	C	3	4	Ret	Ret		2nd	303
2026		ALB; SPR	ALB; FEA	MCO; SPR	MCO; FEA	CAT; SPR	CAT; FEA	RBR; SPR	RBR; FEA	SIL; SPR	SIL; FEA	SPA; SPR	SPA; FEA	HUN; SPR	HUN; FEA	MNZ; SPR	MNZ; FEA	MAD; SPR	MAD; FE1	MAD; FE2			2nd	217
2026	(Denmark) Noah Strømsted	4	23	5	10	11	11	5	1	5	5	10	10	20	12	15	7	20	16	21			2nd	217
2026	(United Kingdom) Freddie Slater	9	2	19	3	2	8	Ret	3	7	2^{P}	Ret	3^{P}	10	1	2	Ret^{P}	18	Ret	8			2nd	217
2026	(Italy) Matteo De Palo	26	22	14	25	25	20	18	14	4	DSQ	28	Ret	27	21^{F}	20	16	12	14	18			2nd	217

=== Macau Grand Prix ===
Year	Car	Driver	FLaps	Qualifying	Qualifying Race	Main Race
2019	Dallara F3 2019-Mecachrome	(Italy) Alessio Lorandi	0	14th	7th	5th
2019	Dallara F3 2019-Mecachrome	(Germany) David Beckmann	0	19th	9th	9th
2019	Dallara F3 2019-Mecachrome	(United Kingdom) Olli Caldwell	0	17th	23rd	29th
2023	Dallara F3 2019-Mecachrome	(Czech Republic) Roman Staněk				
2023	Dallara F3 2019-Mecachrome	(United States) Ugo Ugochukwu				
2023	Dallara F3 2019-Mecachrome	(Netherlands) Richard Verschoor				

=== Formula Regional European Championship ===
Year	Chassis	Engine	Tyres	Drivers	Races	Wins	Poles	F. Laps	Podiums	D.C.	Pts	T.C.	Pts
2022	Tatuus F3 T-318	Renault; MR18 FR	P	(Poland) Roman Bilinski (Note: Bilinski is a Polish and British driver who raced under the Polish flag in 2022 and 2023 and the British flag in 2024.)	20	0	0	0	1	18th	17	5th	136
2022	Tatuus F3 T-318	Renault; MR18 FR	P	(Germany) Tim Tramnitz	20	0	0	0	0	15th	36	5th	136
2022	Tatuus F3 T-318	Renault; MR18 FR	P	(Italy) Leonardo Fornaroli	20	0	0	0	0	8th	83	5th	136
2023	Tatuus F3 T-318	Renault; MR18 FR	P	(Poland) Roman Bilinski	20	0	0	0	0	21st	23	7th	120
2023	Tatuus F3 T-318	Renault; MR18 FR	P	(France) Owen Tangavelou	20	0	0	0	0	14th	43	7th	120
2023	Tatuus F3 T-318	Renault; MR18 FR	P	(Singapore) Nikhil Bohra	20	0	0	0	1	12th	56	7th	120
2024	Tatuus F3 T-318	Renault; MR18 FR	P	(United Kingdom) Roman Bilinski	12	0	1	0	1	14th	52	7th	84
2024	Tatuus F3 T-318	Renault; MR18 FR	P	(Kyrgyzstan) Michael Belov (Note: Belov is a Russian driver who raced under the Kyrgyz flag.)	6	0	0	0	1	19th	26	7th	84
2024	Tatuus F3 T-318	Renault; MR18 FR	P	(Italy) Nicola Lacorte	20	0	0	1	0	21st	3	7th	84
2024	Tatuus F3 T-318	Renault; MR18 FR	P	(China) Ruiqi Liu	20	0	0	0	0	22nd	3	7th	84
2025	Tatuus F3 T-318	Renault; MR18 FR	P	(China) Ruiqi Liu	20	0	0	0	0	18th	4	5th	305
2025	Tatuus F3 T-318	Renault; MR18 FR	P	(Thailand) Nandhavud Bhirombhakdi	20	0	0	0	0	16th	24	5th	305
2025	Tatuus F3 T-318	Renault; MR18 FR	P	(Italy) Matteo de Palo	20	4	3	3	11	**2nd**	**277**	5th	305
2026	Tatuus T-326	Toyota; G16E	P	(Italy) Maximilian Popov (Note: Popov is a Russian driver who raced under the Italian flag.)	19	1	1	0	1	11th	60	9th	70
2026	Tatuus T-326	Toyota; G16E	P	(Serbia) Andrija Kostić	19	0	0	0	0	30th	0	9th	70
2026	Tatuus T-326	Toyota; G16E	P	(India) Kai Daryanani	19	0	0	0	0	25th	10	9th	70

==== In detail ====
(key) (Races in bold indicate pole position) (Races in italics indicate fastest lap)

Year	Drivers	1	2	3	4	5	6	7	8	9	10	11	12	13	14	15	16	17	18	19	20	T.C.	Points
2022		MNZ; 1	MNZ; 2	IMO; 1	IMO; 2	MCO; 1	MCO; 2	LEC; 1	LEC; 2	ZAN; 1	ZAN; 2	HUN; 1	HUN; 2	SPA; 1	SPA; 2	RBR; 1	RBR; 2	CAT; 1	CAT; 2	MUG; 1	MUG; 2	5th	136
2022	(Poland) Roman Bilinski	13	18	14	14	18	Ret	16	9	11	11	3	Ret	11	19	17	Ret	21	14	21	25	5th	136
2022	(Germany) Tim Tramnitz	11	12	9	7	16	Ret	10	10	Ret	Ret	Ret	4	8	7	33†	9	22	13	11	14	5th	136
2022	(Italy) Leonardo Fornaroli	10	15	8	8	9	12	20	23	8	5	4	5	6	8	19	10	9	8	5	8	5th	136
2023		IMO; 1	IMO; 2	CAT; 1	CAT; 2	HUN; 1	HUN; 2	SPA; 1	SPA; 2	MUG; 1	MUG; 2	LEC; 1	LEC; 2	RBR; 1	RBR; 2	MNZ; 1	MNZ; 2	ZAN; 1	ZAN; 2	HOC; 1	HOC; 2	7th	120
2023	(Poland) Roman Bilinski	Ret	Ret	15	8	12	17	13	24	11	15	20	16	7	9	16	14	5	19	11	12	7th	120
2023	(France) Owen Tangavelou	16	13	Ret	16	18	13	23	22	13	8	15	8	10	6	5	8	17	17	Ret	5	7th	120
2023	(Singapore) Nikhil Bohra	9	3	8	14	Ret	12	15	32	17	16	14	Ret	12	5	4	11	18	Ret	8	7	7th	120
2024		HOC; 1	HOC; 2	SPA; 1	SPA; 2	ZAN; 1	ZAN; 2	HUN; 1	HUN; 2	MUG; 1	MUG; 2	LEC; 1	LEC; 2	IMO; 1	IMO; 2	RBR; 1	RBR; 2	CAT; 1	CAT; 2	MNZ; 1	MNZ; 2	7th	84
2024	(United Kingdom) Roman Bilinski	9	11	2^{P}	29†									9	7	4	8	9	Ret	7	26	7th	84
2024	(Kyrgyzstan) Michael Belov							12	11	6	12	2	Ret									7th	84
2024	(Italy) Nicola Lacorte	18	10	16	13	18	16	13	Ret	20	20	9	16	19	13	22^{F}	21	16	16	Ret	14	7th	84
2024	(China) Ruiqi Liu	17	18	18	18	25	23	9	18	13	10	14	17	17	18	Ret	18	18	Ret	24†	18	7th	84
2025		MIS; 1	MIS; 2	SPA; 1	SPA; 2	ZAN; 1	ZAN; 2	HUN; 1	HUN; 2	LEC; 1	LEC; 2	IMO; 1	IMO; 2	RBR; 1	RBR; 2	CAT; 1	CAT; 2	HOC; 1	HOC; 2	MNZ; 1	MNZ; 2	5th	305
2025	(China) Ruiqi Liu	14	12	18	14	19	15	20	21	13	21	14	9	17	19	16	12	11	Ret	10	14	5th	305
2025	(Thailand) Nandhavud Bhirombhakdi	12	8	17	17	16	14	9	11	15	9	16	22	15	9	5	22	16	23	8	16	5th	305
2025	(Italy) Matteo de Palo	1	3	2	6	6	6	1^{P F}	3	2	6	5	4	1^{P}	Ret	1^{F}	7	3^{P}	2^{F}	11	2	5th	305
2026		RBR; 1	RBR; 2	RBR; 3	ZAN; 1	ZAN; 2	SPA; 1	SPA; 2	SPA; 3	MNZ; 1	MNZ; 2	MNZ; 3	HUN; 1	HUN; 2	LEC; 1	LEC; 2	IMO; 1	IMO; 2	IMO; 3	HOC; 1	HOC; 2	9th	70
2026	(Italy) Maximilian Popov	6	11	11	10	Ret	18	C	1^{P}	Ret	13	7	22	20	13	19	11	Ret	6	5	Ret	9th	70
2026	(Serbia) Andrija Kostić	19	13	12	25	Ret	19	C	22	19	Ret	22	27	24	23	Ret	22†	Ret	21	24†	Ret	9th	70
2026	(India) Kai Daryanani	8	8	10	19	Ret	10	C	18	10	Ret	Ret	29	25	24	Ret	21	20	18	23	20	9th	70

=== Italian F4 Championship ===
Year	Car	Drivers	Races	Wins	Poles	Fast Laps	Points	D.C.	T.C.
2026	Tatuus F4-T421	(Brazil) Beco Bernoldi							
2026	Tatuus F4-T421	(Switzerland) Florentin Hattemer							
2026	Tatuus F4-T421	(Brazil) Augustus Toniolo							
2026	Tatuus F4-T421	(Czech Republic) Dominik Šimek							
2026	Tatuus F4-T421	(Bulgaria) Lyuboslav Ruykov							
2026	Tatuus F4-T421	(United Arab Emirates) Lucas Pasquinetti							
2026	Tatuus F4-T421	(China) Yibei Sun							

=== UAE4 Series ===
Year	Car	Drivers	Races	Wins	Poles	Fast Laps	Points	D.C.	T.C.
2026	Tatuus F4-T421	(Switzerland) Florentin Hattemer	12	0	0	0	0	24th	11th
2026	Tatuus F4-T421	(Czech Republic) Dominik Šimek	12	0	0	0	0	27th	11th
2026	Tatuus F4-T421	(Brazil) Bernardo Bernoldi	12	0	0	0	0	31st	11th

== Former series results ==
=== GP2 Series ===
Year	Car	Drivers	Races	Wins	Poles	FLaps	D.C.	Pts	T.C.	Pts
2006	Dallara GP2/05-Mecachrome	(Italy) Gianmaria Bruni	21	2	2	3	7th	33	6th	45
2006	Dallara GP2/05-Mecachrome	(United Arab Emirates) Andreas Zuber	21	1	0	0	14th	12	6th	45
2007	Dallara GP2/05-Mecachrome	(Venezuela) Pastor Maldonado	13	1	1	0	11th	25	10th	35
2007	Dallara GP2/05-Mecachrome	(Japan) Kohei Hirate	21	0	0	0	19th	1	10th	35
2007	Dallara GP2/05-Mecachrome	(Argentina) Ricardo Risatti	6	0	0	0	28th	1	10th	35
2007	Dallara GP2/05-Mecachrome	(Spain) Sergio Hernández	2	0	0	0	36th	0	10th	35
2008	Dallara GP2/08-Mecachrome	(United Kingdom) Mike Conway	20	1	0	1	12th	20	9th	27
2008	Dallara GP2/08-Mecachrome	(China) Ho-Pin Tung	20	0	0	0	18th	7	9th	27
2009	Dallara GP2/08-Mecachrome	(Italy) Davide Rigon	18	0	0	0	22nd	3	12th	3
2009	Dallara GP2/08-Mecachrome	(Portugal) Ricardo Teixeira	20	0	0	0	26th	0	12th	3
2009	Dallara GP2/08-Mecachrome	(Venezuela) Rodolfo González	2	0	0	0	29th	0	12th	3
2010	Dallara GP2/08-Mecachrome	(South Africa) Adrian Zaugg	19	0	0	0	18th	9	11th	14
2010	Dallara GP2/08-Mecachrome	(Venezuela) Johnny Cecotto Jr.	16	0	0	0	23rd		11th	14
2010	Dallara GP2/08-Mecachrome	(Italy) Edoardo Piscopo	2	0	0	0	26th	2	11th	14
2010	Dallara GP2/08-Mecachrome	(Italy) Federico Leo	2	0	0	0	32nd	0	11th	14
2011	Dallara GP2/11-Mecachrome	(Monaco) Stefano Coletti	15	2	0	0	11th	22	8th	22
2011	Dallara GP2/11-Mecachrome	(Venezuela) Rodolfo González	18	0	0	0	26th	0	8th	22
2011	Dallara GP2/11-Mecachrome	(Monaco) Stéphane Richelmi	2	0	0	0	31st	0	8th	22
2012	Dallara GP2/11-Mecachrome	(Monaco) Stéphane Richelmi	24	0	0	0	18th	25	10th	34
2012	Dallara GP2/11-Mecachrome	(Colombia) Julián Leal	24	0	0	0	21st	9	10th	34
2013	Dallara GP2/11-Mecachrome	(Italy) Kevin Ceccon	12	0	0	0	17th	28	11th	49
2013	Dallara GP2/11-Mecachrome	(France) Nathanaël Berthon	22	1	0	1	20th	21	11th	49
2013	Dallara GP2/11-Mecachrome	(Canada) Gianmarco Raimondo	4	0	0	0	30th	0	11th	49
2013	Dallara GP2/11-Mecachrome	(Italy) Sergio Campana	2	0	0	0	32nd	0	11th	49
2013	Dallara GP2/11-Mecachrome	(Portugal) Ricardo Teixeira	4	0	0	0	34th	0	11th	49
2014	Dallara GP2/11-Mecachrome	(Venezuela) Johnny Cecotto Jr.	22	2	1	0	5th	140	6th	169
2014	Dallara GP2/11-Mecachrome	(Spain) Sergio Canamasas	19	0	0	0	14th	29	6th	169
2014	Dallara GP2/11-Mecachrome	(Zimbabwe) Axcil Jefferies	2	0	0	0	34th	0	6th	169
2015	Dallara GP2/11-Mecachrome	(Italy) Raffaele Marciello	22	0	0	0	7th	110	7th	111
2015	Dallara GP2/11-Mecachrome	(Austria) René Binder (Note: Rene Binder left Trident after Hungary and joined MP Motorsport for Monza where he will score 2 points for MP Motorsport)	12	0	0	0	22nd	2	7th	111
2015	Dallara GP2/11-Mecachrome	(Netherlands) Daniël de Jong (Note: Daniel De Jong joined Trident after Sochi after leaving MP Motorsport after Spa. He had scored 2 points for MP Motorsport.)	4	0	0	0	23rd	1	7th	111
2015	Dallara GP2/11-Mecachrome	(Sweden) Gustav Malja	2	0	0	0	25th	1	7th	111
2015	Dallara GP2/11-Mecachrome	(Venezuela) Johnny Cecotto Jr.	4	0	0	0	28th	0	7th	111
2016	Dallara GP2/11-Mecachrome	(Italy) Luca Ghiotto	22	1	0	2	8th	111	8th	111
2016	Dallara GP2/11-Mecachrome	(Indonesia) Philo Paz Armand	22	0	0	0	24th	0	8th	111

=== In detail ===
(key) (Races in bold indicate pole position) (Races in italics indicate fastest lap)

Year	Chassis Engine Tyres	Drivers	1	2	3	4	5	6	7	8	9	10	11	12	13	14	15	16	17	18	19	20	21	22	23	24	T.C.	Points
2006	GP2/05; Renault; **B**		VAL; FEA	VAL; SPR	SMR; FEA	SMR; SPR	NÜR; FEA	NÜR; SPR	CAT; FEA	CAT; SPR	MON; FEA	SIL; FEA	SIL; SPR	MAG; FEA	MAG; SPR	HOC; FEA	HOC; SPR	HUN; FEA	HUN; SPR	IST; FEA	IST; SPR	MNZ; FEA	MNZ; SPR				6th	45
2006	GP2/05; Renault; **B**	(Italy) Gianmaria Bruni	6	5	**1**	Ret	Ret	16	Ret	17	Ret	Ret	15	Ret	Ret	**1**	6	Ret	8	Ret	15	Ret	9				6th	45
2006	GP2/05; Renault; **B**	(United Arab Emirates) Andreas Zuber	Ret	13	Ret	8	14	Ret	Ret	11	5	Ret	Ret	Ret	18	Ret	14	14	9	7	1	Ret	NC				6th	45
2007	GP2/05; Renault; **B**		BHR; FEA	BHR; SPR	CAT; FEA	CAT; SPR	MON; FEA	MAG; FEA	MAG; SPR	SIL; FEA	SIL; SPR	NÜR; FEA	NÜR; SPR	HUN; FEA	HUN; SPR	IST; FEA	IST; SPR	MNZ; FEA	MNZ; SPR	SPA; FEA	SPA; SPR	VAL; FEA	VAL; SPR				10th	35
2007	GP2/05; Renault; **B**	(Venezuela) Pastor Maldonado	DNS	16^{†}	Ret	17^{†}	**1**	10	8	7	2	6	4	Ret	Ret												10th	35
2007	GP2/05; Renault; **B**	(Argentina) Ricardo Risatti														16	10	8	Ret	20^{†}	18						10th	35
2007	GP2/05; Renault; **B**	(Spain) Sergio Hernández																				Ret	19				10th	35
2007	GP2/05; Renault; **B**	(Japan) Kohei Hirate	18	Ret	13	10	12	Ret	11	18	Ret	5	2	11	10	Ret	Ret	Ret	10	Ret	13	Ret	16				10th	35
2008	GP2/08; Renault; **B**		CAT; FEA	CAT; SPR	IST; FEA	IST; SPR	MON; FEA	MON; SPR	MAG; FEA	MAG; SPR	SIL; FEA	SIL; SPR	HOC; FEA	HOC; SPR	HUN; FEA	HUN; SPR	VAL; FEA	VAL; SPR	SPA; FEA	SPA; SPR	MNZ; FEA	MNZ; SPR					9th	27
2008	GP2/08; Renault; **B**	(United Kingdom) Mike Conway	Ret	8	9	5	8^{†}	1	8	6	14	4	Ret	9	6	11	Ret	8	7	Ret	13	Ret					9th	27
2008	GP2/08; Renault; **B**	(China) Ho-Pin Tung	Ret	14	11	Ret	7	2	Ret	14	18	Ret	13	7	Ret	14	Ret	9	15	10	Ret	8					9th	27
2009	GP2/08; Renault; **B**		CAT; FEA	CAT; SPR	MON; FEA	MON; SPR	IST; FEA	IST; SPR	SIL; FEA	SIL; SPR	NÜR; FEA	NÜR; SPR	HUN; FEA	HUN; SPR	VAL; FEA	VAL; SPR	SPA; FEA	SPA; SPR	MNZ; FEA	MNZ; SPR	ALG; FEA	ALG; SPR					12th	3
2009	GP2/08; Renault; **B**	(Portugal) Ricardo Teixeira	Ret	20	DNQ	DNQ	14	18	Ret	18	Ret	15	Ret	19	Ret	14	Ret	14	16	14	15	21					12th	3
2009	GP2/08; Renault; **B**	(Italy) Davide Rigon	17	21^{†}	9	7	10	8	16	20			8	Ret	12	7	Ret	5	9	8	14	9					12th	3
2009	GP2/08; Renault; **B**	(Venezuela) Rodolfo González									15	19															12th	3
2010	GP2/08; Renault; **B**		CAT; FEA	CAT; SPR	MON; FEA	MON; SPR	IST; FEA	IST; SPR	VAL; FEA	VAL; SPR	SIL; FEA	SIL; SPR	HOC; FEA	HOC; SPR	HUN; FEA	HUN; SPR	SPA; FEA	SPA; SPR	MNZ; FEA	MNZ; SPR	YMC; FEA	YMC; SPR					11th	14
2010	GP2/08; Renault; **B**	(Venezuela) Johnny Cecotto Jr.	Ret	17	9	4	12	12	Ret	14	18	23	13	Ret	Ret	13	10	Ret									11th	14
2010	GP2/08; Renault; **B**	(Italy) Edoardo Piscopo																	7	Ret							11th	14
2010	GP2/08; Renault; **B**	(Italy) Federico Leo																			19	Ret					11th	14
2010	GP2/08; Renault; **B**	(South Africa) Adrian Zaugg	16	15	Ret	12	Ret	Ret	14	15	15	21	7	3	15	8	15	9	6	7	Ret	DNS					11th	14
2011	GP2/11; Mecachrome; **P**		IST; FEA	IST; SPR	CAT; FEA	CAT; SPR	MON; FEA	MON; SPR	VAL; FEA	VAL; SPR	SIL; FEA	SIL; SPR	NÜR; FEA	NÜR; SPR	HUN; FEA	HUN; SPR	SPA; FEA	SPA; SPR	MNZ; FEA	MNZ; SPR							8th	22
2011	GP2/11; Mecachrome; **P**	(Venezuela) Rodolfo González	Ret	22	20	10	Ret	14	15	Ret	18	13	9	15	Ret	9	Ret	17	19	16							8th	22
2011	GP2/11; Mecachrome; **P**	(Monaco) Stefano Coletti	5	1	10	20^{†}	5	Ret	17	19^{†}	7	22	Ret	Ret	21	1	Ret	DNS									8th	22
2011	GP2/11; Mecachrome; **P**	(Monaco) Stéphane Richelmi																	15	14							8th	22
2012	GP2/11; Mecachrome; **P**		SEP; FEA	SEP; SPR	BHR1; FEA	BHR1; SPR	BHR2; FEA	BHR2; SPR	CAT; FEA	CAT; SPR	MON; FEA	MON; SPR	VAL; FEA	VAL; SPR	SIL; FEA	SIL; SPR	HOC; FEA	HOC; SPR	HUN; FEA	HUN; SPR	SPA; FEA	SPA; SPR	MNZ; FEA	MNZ; SPR	MRN; FEA	MRN; SPR	10th	34
2012	GP2/11; Mecachrome; **P**	(Monaco) Stéphane Richelmi	19	19	11	Ret	17	17	21	19	8	Ret	14	Ret	13	Ret	3	21	17	21	9	6	13	9	14	22^{†}	10th	34
2012	GP2/11; Mecachrome; **P**	(Colombia) Julián Leal	15	15	12	17	15	14	24	17	21	Ret	12	8	20	17	21	12	16	15	7	9	10	8	11	16	10th	34
2013	GP2/11; Mecachrome; **P**		SEP; FEA	SEP; SPR	BHR; FEA	BHR; SPR	CAT; FEA	CAT; SPR	MON; FEA	MON; SPR	SIL; FEA	SIL; SPR	NÜR; FEA	NÜR; SPR	HUN; FEA	HUN; SPR	SPA; FEA	SPA; SPR	MNZ; FEA	MNZ; SPR	MRN; FEA	MRN; SPR	YMC; FEA	YMC; SPR			11th	49
2013	GP2/11; Mecachrome; **P**	(France) Nathanaël Berthon	Ret	21	17	22	Ret	23	Ret	21	20	Ret	17	15	8	1	22	13	Ret	21	Ret	10	18^{†}	13			11th	49
2013	GP2/11; Mecachrome; **P**	(Italy) Kevin Ceccon	17	22	11	10	7	7	2	7	Ret	12	Ret	DNS													11th	49
2013	GP2/11; Mecachrome; **P**	(Portugal) Ricardo Teixeira													19	19	21	24									11th	49
2013	GP2/11; Mecachrome; **P**	(Italy) Sergio Campana																	15	24							11th	49
2013	GP2/11; Mecachrome; **P**	(Canada) Gianmarco Raimondo																			21	22	17	15			11th	49
2014	GP2/11; Mecachrome; **P**		BHR; FEA	BHR; SPR	CAT; FEA	CAT; SPR	MON; FEA	MON; SPR	RBR; FEA	RBR; SPR	SIL; FEA	SIL; SPR	HOC; FEA	HOC; SPR	HUN; FEA	HUN; SPR	SPA; FEA	SPA; SPR	MNZ; FEA	MNZ; SPR	SOC; FEA	SOC; SPR	YMC; FEA	YMC; SPR			6th	169
2014	GP2/11; Mecachrome; **P**	(Zimbabwe) Axcil Jefferies	Ret	21																							6th	169
2014	GP2/11; Mecachrome; **P**	(Spain) Sergio Canamasas			17	18	5	2	15	9	15	Ret	15	13	Ret	DNS	20	Ret	18	DSQ	7	Ret	16	8			6th	169
2014	GP2/11; Mecachrome; **P**	(Venezuela) Johnny Cecotto Jr.	21	14	1	6	4	4	**6**	1	6	3	7	Ret	Ret	Ret	3	2	10	Ret	19	23^{†}	6	6			6th	169
2015	GP2/11; Mecachrome; **P**		BHR1; FEA	BHR1; SPR	CAT; FEA	CAT; SPR	MON; FEA	MON; SPR	RBR; FEA	RBR; SPR	SIL; FEA	SIL; SPR	HUN; FEA	HUN; SPR	SPA; FEA	SPA; SPR	MNZ; FEA	MNZ; SPR	SOC; FEA	SOC; SPR	BHR2; FEA	BHR2; SPR	YMC; FEA	YMC; SPR			7th	111
2015	GP2/11; Mecachrome; **P**	(Italy) Raffaele Marciello	Ret	20	6	17	8	2	15	10	6	2	7	4	14	12	15	7	6	3	4	5	2	C			7th	111
2015	GP2/11; Mecachrome; **P**	(Austria) René Binder	17	Ret	22	Ret	11	16	17	14	17	18	23	24													7th	111
2015	GP2/11; Mecachrome; **P**	(Sweden) Gustav Malja													10	18											7th	111
2015	GP2/11; Mecachrome; **P**	(Venezuela) Johnny Cecotto Jr.															18	13	13	22^{†}							7th	111
2015	GP2/11; Mecachrome; **P**	(Netherlands) Daniël de Jong																			19	14	Ret	C			7th	111
2016	GP2/11; Mecachrome; **P**		CAT; FEA	CAT; SPR	MON; FEA	MON; SPR	BAK; FEA	BAK; SPR	RBR; FEA	RBR; SPR	SIL; FEA	SIL; SPR	HUN; FEA	HUN; SPR	HOC; FEA	HOC; SPR	SPA; FEA	SPA; SPR	MNZ; FEA	MNZ; SPR	SEP; FEA	SEP; SPR	YMC; FEA	YMC; SPR			8th	111
2016	GP2/11; Mecachrome; **P**	(Indonesia) Philo Paz Armand	Ret	Ret	16	Ret	Ret	Ret	15	14	20	20	19	15	16	Ret	20	19	19	17	19	Ret	16	18			8th	111
2016	GP2/11; Mecachrome; **P**	(Italy) Luca Ghiotto	Ret	12	Ret	14	9	12	4	9	5	2	17	Ret	2	4	7	3	6	Ret	7	1	11	19			8th	111

=== GP2 Final ===
(key) (Races in bold indicate pole position) (Races in italics indicate fastest lap)

Year	Chassis Engine Tyres	Drivers	1	2	T.C.	Points
2011	GP2/11; Mecachrome; **P**		YMC; FEA	YMC; SPR	13th	0
2011	GP2/11; Mecachrome; **P**	(Colombia) Julián Leal	16	21	13th	0
2011	GP2/11; Mecachrome; **P**	(Monaco) Stéphane Richelmi	19	18	13th	0

=== GP2 Asia Series ===
Year	Car	Drivers	Races	Wins	Poles	FLaps	D.C.	Pts	T.C.	Pts
2008	Dallara GP2/08-Mecachrome	(Latvia) Harald Schlegelmilch	10	0	0	0	18th	3	13th	4
2008	Dallara GP2/08-Mecachrome	(China) Ho-Pin Tung	10	0	0	0	21st	1	13th	4
2008-09	Dallara GP2/08-Mecachrome	(Italy) Davide Rigon	6	0	0	0	17th	6	9th	11
2008-09	Dallara GP2/08-Mecachrome	(New Zealand) Chris van der Drift	3	0	0	0	18th	5	9th	11
2008-09	Dallara GP2/08-Mecachrome	(Italy) Giacomo Ricci	2	0	0	0	27th (Note: Ricci also drive for the David Price Racing team.)	0	9th	11
2008-09	Dallara GP2/08-Mecachrome	(Italy) Frankie Provenzano	4	0	0	0	35th	0	9th	11
2008-09	Dallara GP2/08-Mecachrome	(Brazil) Alberto Valerio	1	0	0	0	37th	0	9th	11
2008-09	Dallara GP2/08-Mecachrome	(Portugal) Ricardo Teixeira	4	0	0	0	38th	0	9th	11
2008-09	Dallara GP2/08-Mecachrome	(Spain) Adrián Vallés	2	0	0	0	40th	0	9th	11
2009-10	Dallara GP2/08-Mecachrome	(Venezuela) Johnny Cecotto Jr.	2	0	0	0	17th	3	11th	4
2009-10	Dallara GP2/08-Mecachrome	(South Africa) Adrian Zaugg	2	0	0	0	19th	1	11th	4
2009-10	Dallara GP2/08-Mecachrome	(Spain) Dani Clos	4	0	0	0	27th	0	11th	4
2009-10	Dallara GP2/08-Mecachrome	(Bulgaria) Plamen Kralev	8	0	0	0	33rd	0	11th	4
2011	Dallara GP2/11-Mecachrome	(Monaco) Stefano Coletti	4	1	0	0	4th	11	4th	11
2011	Dallara GP2/11-Mecachrome	(Venezuela) Rodolfo González	4	0	0	0	17th	0	4th	11

=== In detail ===
(key) (Races in bold indicate pole position) (Races in italics indicate fastest lap)

Year	Chassis Engine Tyres	Drivers	1	2	3	4	5	6	7	8	9	10	11	12	T.C.	Points
2008	GP2/05; Renault; **B**		DUB1; FEA	DUB1; SPR	SEN; FEA	SEN; SPR	SEP; FEA	SEP; SPR	BHR; FEA	BHR; SPR	DUB2; FEA	DUB2; SPR			13th	4
2008	GP2/05; Renault; **B**	(Latvia) Harald Schlegelmilch	14	18	Ret	Ret	8	Ret	14	5	16	7			13th	4
2008	GP2/05; Renault; **B**	(China) Ho-Pin Tung	22	10	Ret	6	Ret	16	Ret	7	10	DSQ			13th	4
2008–09	GP2/05; Renault; **B**		SHI; FEA	SHI; SPR	DUB3; FEA	DUB3; SPR	BHR1; FEA	BHR1; SPR	LSL; FEA	LSL; SPR	SEP; FEA	SEP; SPR	BHR2; FEA	BHR2; SPR	9th	11
2008–09	GP2/05; Renault; **B**	(Italy) Giacomo Ricci	13	Ret											9th	11
2008–09	GP2/05; Renault; **B**	(Brazil) Alberto Valerio			16	C									9th	11
2008–09	GP2/05; Renault; **B**	(Italy) Frankie Provenzano					15	15	19	20					9th	11
2008–09	GP2/05; Renault; **B**	(Portugal) Ricardo Teixeira									17	19	17	Ret	9th	11
2008–09	GP2/05; Renault; **B**	(Australia) Chris van der Drift	7	4	Ret	C									9th	11
2008–09	GP2/05; Renault; **B**	(Spain) Adrián Vallés					Ret	19							9th	11
2008–09	GP2/05; Renault; **B**	(Italy) Davide Rigon							14	15	Ret	13	7	3	9th	11
2009–10	GP2/05; Renault; **B**		YMC1; FEA	YMC1; SPR	YMC2; FEA	YMC2; SPR	BHR1; FEA	BHR1; SPR	BHR2; FEA	BHR2; SPR					11th	4
2009–10	GP2/05; Renault; **B**	(Venezuela) Johnny Cecotto Jr.	7	6											11th	4
2009–10	GP2/05; Renault; **B**	(Spain) Dani Clos			Ret	13			14	12					11th	4
2009–10	GP2/05; Renault; **B**	(South Africa) Adrian Zaugg					8	19							11th	4
2009–10	GP2/05; Renault; **B**	(Bulgaria) Plamen Kralev	Ret	Ret	16	20	22	16	Ret	18					11th	4
2011	GP2/11; Mecachrome; **P**		YMC; FEA	YMC; SPR	IMO; FEA	IMO; SPR									4th	11
2011	GP2/11; Mecachrome; **P**	(Monaco) Stefano Coletti	8	1	5	Ret									4th	11
2011	GP2/11; Mecachrome; **P**	(Venezuela) Rodolfo González	11	9	9	Ret									4th	11

==== International Formula Master ====
Year	Car	Drivers	Races	Wins	Poles	F.L.	D.C.	T.C.	Points
2008	Tatuus N.T07-Honda	(Germany) Michael Ammermüller (Note: Michael Ammermüller joined Trident Racing for the last weekend of 2008 season. At that point he had collected 70 points with Iris Project)	16	1	0	0	**3rd**	**2nd**	**96**
2008	Tatuus N.T07-Honda	(Latvia) Harald Schlegelmilch	16	1	0	0	4th	**2nd**	**96**
2008	Tatuus N.T07-Honda	(Denmark) Kasper Andersen	10	0	0	0	9th	**2nd**	**96**
2008	Tatuus N.T07-Honda	(Spain) Alejandro Núñez	10	0	0	0	17th	**2nd**	**96**
2008	Tatuus N.T07-Honda	(Mexico) Esteban Gutiérrez	2	0	0	0	19th	**2nd**	**96**
2008	Tatuus N.T07-Honda	(Germany) Dominik Wasem	2	0	0	0	26th	**2nd**	**96**
2009	Tatuus N.T07-Honda	(Italy) Frankie Provenzano (Note: Frankie Provenzano joined Trident Racing for the first weekend of 2009 season. At that point he had collected 2 points before his switching to Cram Competition.)	10	0	0	0	15th	10th	2

==== Auto GP ====
Year	Car	Drivers	Races	Wins	Poles	F.L.	D.C.	T.C.	Points
2010	Lola B05/52-Zytek	(Colombia) Julián Leal	12	1	1	1	9th	4th	33
2010	Lola B05/52-Zytek	(South Africa) Adrian Zaugg	2	0	0	0	15th	4th	33
2010	Lola B05/52-Zytek	(Italy) Federico Leo	2	0	0	0	16th	4th	33
2010	Lola B05/52-Zytek	(Italy) Fabrizio Crestani	4	0	0	0	22nd	4th	33

=== GP3 Series ===
Year	Car	Drivers	Races	Wins	Poles	F.L.	D.C.	T.C.	Points
2012	Dallara GP3/10-Renault	(Italy) Giovanni Venturini	10	0	0	0	13th	9th	31
2012	Dallara GP3/10-Renault	(Italy) Vicky Piria	16	0	0	0	26th	9th	31
2012	Dallara GP3/10-Renault	(Italy) Antonio Spavone	8	0	0	0	30th	9th	31
2013	Dallara GP3/13-Renault	(Italy) Giovanni Venturini	18	1	0	0	15th	8th	32
2013	Dallara GP3/13-Renault	(Italy) David Fumanelli	16	0	0	0	19th	8th	32
2013	Dallara GP3/13-Renault	(San Marino) Emanuele Zonzini	18	0	0	0	25th	8th	32
2013	Dallara GP3/13-Renault	(Republic of Ireland) Robert Cregan	2	0	0	0	27th	8th	32
2014	Dallara GP3/13-Renault	(Finland) Patrick Kujala (Note: Patrick Kujala joined Trident Racing for the last two weekends of 2014 season. At that point he had collected 22 points with Marussia Manor Racing.)	18	0	0	0	14th	9th	12
2014	Dallara GP3/13-Renault	(South Africa) Roman de Beer	10	0	0	0	18th	9th	12
2014	Dallara GP3/13-Renault	(Italy) Luca Ghiotto	4	0	0	1	20th	9th	12
2014	Dallara GP3/13-Renault	(United Kingdom) Ryan Cullen	2	0	0	0	25th	9th	12
2014	Dallara GP3/13-Renault	(Australia) Mitchell Gilbert	10	0	0	0	26th	9th	12
2014	Dallara GP3/13-Renault	(China) Kang Ling	2	0	0	0	28th	9th	12
2014	Dallara GP3/13-Renault	(Sweden) John Bryant-Meisner	4	0	0	0	30th	9th	12
2014	Dallara GP3/13-Renault	(Brazil) Victor Carbone	4	0	0	0	31st	9th	12
2014	Dallara GP3/13-Renault	(Russia) Denis Nagulin	2	0	0	0	35th	9th	12
2014	Dallara GP3/13-Renault	(Russia) Konstantin Tereshchenko	2	0	0	0	NC	9th	12
2015	Dallara GP3/13-Renault	(Italy) Luca Ghiotto	22	5	5	9	**2nd**	**2nd**	**282**
2015	Dallara GP3/13-Renault	(Poland) Artur Janosz	22	0	0	0	14th	**2nd**	**282**
2015	Dallara GP3/13-Renault	(Colombia) Óscar Tunjo	6	1	0	0	15th	**2nd**	**282**
2015	Dallara GP3/13-Renault	(Netherlands) Beitske Visser	2	0	0	0	28th	**2nd**	**282**
2015	Dallara GP3/13-Renault	(Belgium) Amaury Bonduel	2	0	0	0	26th	**2nd**	**282**
2015	Dallara GP3/13-Renault	(Italy) Michele Beretta	6	0	0	0	27th	**2nd**	**282**
2016	Dallara GP3/16-Mecachrome	(Italy) Antonio Fuoco	18	2	0	0	**3rd**	**3rd**	**170**
2016	Dallara GP3/16-Mecachrome	(Thailand) Sandy Stuvik	18	0	0	0	18th	**3rd**	**170**
2016	Dallara GP3/16-Mecachrome	(Poland) Artur Janosz	18	0	0	0	20th	**3rd**	**170**
2016	Dallara GP3/16-Mecachrome	(France) Giuliano Alesi	15	0	0	0	22nd	**3rd**	**170**
2017	Dallara GP3/16-Mecachrome	(France) Giuliano Alesi	16	3	0	1	5th	**2nd**	**286**
2017	Dallara GP3/16-Mecachrome	(France) Dorian Boccolacci	16	1	0	0	6th	**2nd**	**286**
2017	Dallara GP3/16-Mecachrome	(United States) Ryan Tveter	16	0	0	0	8th	**2nd**	**286**
2017	Dallara GP3/16-Mecachrome	(Switzerland) Kevin Jörg	16	0	0	0	12th	**2nd**	**286**
2018	Dallara GP3/16-Mecachrome	(Germany) David Beckmann (Note: David Beckmann joined Trident Racing for the last five weekends of 2019 season. At that point he had collected 10 points with Jenzer Motorsport.)	18	3	2	2	5th	**2nd**	**433**
2018	Dallara GP3/16-Mecachrome	(Brazil) Pedro Piquet	18	2	0	0	6th	**2nd**	**433**
2018	Dallara GP3/16-Mecachrome	(France) Giuliano Alesi	18	1	0	1	7th	**2nd**	**433**
2018	Dallara GP3/16-Mecachrome	(United States) Ryan Tveter	16	0	0	1	9th	**2nd**	**433**
2018	Dallara GP3/16-Mecachrome	(Italy) Alessio Lorandi	8	0	0	0	11th	**2nd**	**433**

=== In detail ===
(key) (Races in bold indicate pole position) (Races in italics indicate fastest lap)

Year	Chassis Engine Tyres	Drivers	1	2	3	4	5	6	7	8	9	10	11	12	13	14	15	16	17	18	T.C.	Points
2012	GP3/10; Renault; **P**		CAT; FEA	CAT; SPR	MON; FEA	MON; SPR	VAL; FEA	VAL; SPR	SIL; FEA	SIL; SPR	HOC; FEA	HOC; SPR	HUN; FEA	HUN; SPR	SPA; FEA	SPA; SPR	MNZ; FEA	MNZ; SPR			9th	31
2012	GP3/10; Renault; **P**	(Italy) Vicky Piria	22	16	19	12	17	18	18	21^{†}	14	Ret	20	19	16	19	16	Ret			9th	31
2012	GP3/10; Renault; **P**	(Italy) Antonio Spavone	17	Ret	20	14	Ret	17	21	18											9th	31
2012	GP3/10; Renault; **P**	(Italy) Giovanni Venturini							13	16	3	8	11	Ret	9	9	8	3			9th	31
2013	GP3/13; AER; **P**		CAT; FEA	CAT; SPR	VAL; FEA	VAL; SPR	SIL; FEA	SIL; SPR	NÜR; FEA	NÜR; SPR	HUN; FEA	HUN; SPR	SPA; FEA	SPA; SPR	MNZ; FEA	MNZ; SPR	YMC; FEA	YMC; SPR			8th	32
2013	GP3/13; AER; **P**	(Italy) Giovanni Venturini	12	8	15	13	8	1	16	14	9	6	11	11	11	Ret	11	9			8th	32
2013	GP3/13; AER; **P**	(Italy) David Fumanelli	7	17	Ret	Ret	Ret	20	17	20	16	18	15	14	15	18					8th	32
2013	GP3/13; AER; **P**	(Republic of Ireland) Robert Cregan															16	13			8th	32
2013	GP3/13; AER; **P**	(San Marino) Emanuele Zonzini	17	Ret	16	14	19	Ret	15	12	Ret	Ret	Ret	23	14	14	14	14			8th	32
2014	GP3/13; AER; **P**		CAT; FEA	CAT; SPR	RBR; FEA	RBR; SPR	SIL; FEA	SIL; SPR	HOC; FEA	HOC; SPR	HUN; FEA	HUN; SPR	SPA; FEA	SPA; SPR	MNZ; FEA	MNZ; SPR	SOC; FEA	SOC; SPR	YMC; FEA	YMC; SPR	9th	12
2014	GP3/13; AER; **P**	(Brazil) Victor Carbone	Ret	17	18	18	23	Ret	23	20											9th	12
2014	GP3/13; AER; **P**	(Russia) Konstantin Tereshchenko											DNS	DNS							9th	12
2014	GP3/13; AER; **P**	(Italy) Luca Ghiotto									**18**	14			21	13					9th	12
2014	GP3/13; AER; **P**	(China) Kang Ling																	20	16	9th	12
2014	GP3/13; AER; **P**	(South Africa) Roman de Beer	Ret	DSQ	12	4	17	16	21	17	15	12									9th	12
2014	GP3/13; AER; **P**	(Sweden) John Bryant-Meisner											20^{†}	22	17	17					9th	12
2014	GP3/13; AER; **P**	(Finland) Patrick Kujala															13	9	Ret	14	9th	12
2014	GP3/13; AER; **P**	(United Kingdom) Ryan Cullen																	19	Ret	9th	12
2014	GP3/13; AER; **P**	(Russia) Denis Nagulin	20	Ret																	9th	12
2014	GP3/13; AER; **P**	(Australia) Mitchell Gilbert					DNS	DNS	14	Ret	20	24			18	20	20	14			9th	12
2015	GP3/13; AER; **P**		CAT; FEA	CAT; SPR	RBR; FEA	RBR; SPR	SIL; FEA	SIL; SPR	HUN; FEA	HUN; SPR	SPA; FEA	SPA; SPR	MNZ; FEA	MNZ; SPR	SOC; FEA	SOC; SPR	BHR; FEA	BHR; SPR	YMC; FEA	YMC; SPR	2nd	282
2015	GP3/13; AER; **P**	(Poland) Artur Janosz	15	12	21	9	9	17	16	Ret	12	7	16	Ret	10	5	6	12	10	9	2nd	282
2015	GP3/13; AER; **P**	(Italy) Luca Ghiotto	**2**	8	**1**	3	4	7	**1**	4	**5**	1	**Ret**	3	1	8	4	1	5	4	2nd	282
2015	GP3/13; AER; **P**	(Colombia) Óscar Tunjo	16	11	9	1	11	10													2nd	282
2015	GP3/13; AER; **P**	(Netherlands) Beitske Visser									Ret	15									2nd	282
2015	GP3/13; AER; **P**	(France) Amaury Bonduel											14	12							2nd	282
2015	GP3/13; AER; **P**	(Italy) Michele Beretta													18	13	20	15	20	18	2nd	282
2016	GP3/16; Mecachrome; **P**		CAT; FEA	CAT; SPR	RBR; FEA	RBR; SPR	SIL; FEA	SIL; SPR	HUN; FEA	HUN; SPR	HOC; FEA	HOC; SPR	SPA; FEA	SPA; SPR	MNZ; FEA	MNZ; SPR	SEP; FEA	SEP; SPR	YMC; FEA	YMC; SPR	3rd	170
2016	GP3/16; Mecachrome; **P**	(Italy) Antonio Fuoco	4	3	5	3	3	1	2	10	1	18^{†}	4	2	8	3	8	Ret	16	17	3rd	170
2016	GP3/16; Mecachrome; **P**	(Poland) Artur Janosz	16	12	11	9	9	15	14	12	11	Ret	12	9	16	8	Ret	16	Ret	19	3rd	170
2016	GP3/16; Mecachrome; **P**	(France) Giuliano Alesi	22	16	DNS	DNS	16	Ret	19	16	Ret	14	10	12	DNS	19	16	13	11	10	3rd	170
2016	GP3/16; Mecachrome; **P**	(Thailand) Sandy Stuvik	18	15	10	8	7	10	18	18	Ret	12	Ret	17^{†}	12	15	10	20	15	18	3rd	170
2017	GP3/16; Mecachrome; **P**		CAT; FEA	CAT; SPR	RBR; FEA	RBR; SPR	SIL; FEA	SIL; SPR	HUN; FEA	HUN; SPR	SPA; FEA	SPA; SPR	MNZ; FEA	MNZ; SPR	JER; FEA	JER; SPR	YMC; FEA	YMC; SPR			2nd	286
2017	GP3/16; Mecachrome; **P**	(Switzerland) Kevin Jörg	13	9	11	9	9	7	7	3	10	8	9	C	20	18	9	7			2nd	286
2017	GP3/16; Mecachrome; **P**	(France) Giuliano Alesi	17	11	6	2	7	1	6	1	7	1	6	C	9	7	Ret	10			2nd	286
2017	GP3/16; Mecachrome; **P**	(United States) Ryan Tveter	12	18	5	4	Ret	13	8	2	6	3	5	C	12	14	8	2			2nd	286
2017	GP3/16; Mecachrome; **P**	(France) Dorian Boccolacci	6	2	9	17^{†}	8	Ret	5	4	5	17	14	C	7	2	7	1			2nd	286
2018	GP3/16; Mecachrome; **P**		CAT; FEA	CAT; SPR	LEC; FEA	LEC; SPR	RBR; FEA	RBR; SPR	SIL; FEA	SIL; SPR	HUN; FEA	HUN; SPR	SPA; FEA	SPA; SPR	MNZ; FEA	MNZ; SPR	SOC; FEA	SOC; SPR	YMC; FEA	YMC; SPR	2nd	433
2018	GP3/16; Mecachrome; **P**	(Brazil) Pedro Piquet	9	Ret	6	2	4	2	7	1	12	9	4	5	7	1	15	11	12	Ret	2nd	433
2018	GP3/16; Mecachrome; **P**	(France) Giuliano Alesi	7	1	3	6	6	Ret	8	2	17^{†}	16	9	6	6	2	14	17	6	10	2nd	433
2018	GP3/16; Mecachrome; **P**	(United States) Ryan Tveter	17	14	11	9	7	Ret	4	3	5	6	2	8	11	16	18	9	11	5	2nd	433
2018	GP3/16; Mecachrome; **P**	(Italy) Alessio Lorandi	11	16	5	4	3	4	10	12											2nd	433
2018	GP3/16; Mecachrome; **P**	(Germany) David Beckmann									4	7	**1**	Ret	**1**	5	5	1	2	Ret	2nd	433

== Timeline ==
Current series
FIA Formula 2 Championship	2017–present
FIA Formula 3 Championship	2019–present
Formula Regional European Championship	2022–present
Formula Regional Middle East Trophy	2026–present
UAE4 Series	2026–present
Italian F4 Championship	2026–present
Former series
GP2 Asia Series	2008–2011
International Formula Master	2008–2009
Auto GP	2010
GP2 Series	2006–2016
GP3 Series	2012–2018
