= 2005 3000 Pro Series =

Seasons
- ← none 2006 →

The 2005 3000 Pro Series was the inaugural season of what later would become the International Formula Master racing series. The season consisted of eight rounds, beginning on 10 April at the ACI Vallelunga Circuit and finishing on 9 October at the Autodromo Nazionale Monza. 10 different teams and 26 different drivers competed. In this one-make formula all drivers had to utilize Lola B99/50 chassis and Zytek engines. It was won by Italian Massimiliano Busnelli (Max Busnelli), driving for Pro Motorsport. Although Busnelli and Austrian Norbert Siedler finished tied on 49 points with the exact same number of wins and podium, Busnelli was officially awarded the sole championship title dy the organizer Peroni Promotion Incentive based on the sporting regulation tiebreaker rule.

== Teams and drivers ==
Team	No.	Driver	Rounds
(Italy) Draco Junior Team	2	(Germany) Timo Lienemann	All
(Italy) Draco Junior Team	3	(Italy) Alessandro Bonetti	All
(Italy) CEK Team	4	(Italy) Marco Mocci	1–5, 7
(Italy) CEK Team	4	(Russia) Daniil Move	8
(Italy) CEK Team	5	(Russia) Sergey Zlobin	8
(Italy) ADM Motorsport	6	(Italy) Fausto Ippoliti	All
(Italy) ADM Motorsport	7	(Austria) Norbert Siedler	All
(Italy) ADM Motorsport	8	(Italy) Stefano Attianese	1-2
(Italy) ADM Motorsport	8	(Austria) Franz Wöss	6
(Italy) ADM Motorsport	8	(Italy) Davide Valsecchi	8
(Italy) Scuderia Famà	9	(Netherlands) Olivier Tielemans	1–6, 8
(Italy) Scuderia Famà	10	(France) Jean de Pourtales	1-4
(Italy) Scuderia Famà	10	(Italy) Matteo Pellegrino	5
(Italy) Scuderia Famà	10	(Italy) Nino Famà	6
(Italy) Scuderia Famà	10	(Italy) Marco Mocci	8
(United Kingdom) Team JVA	11	(Thailand) Tor Graves	All
(United Kingdom) Team JVA	12	(United Kingdom) Dominik Jackson	1, 3
(United Kingdom) Team JVA	12	(United Kingdom) Scott Mansell	2
(United Kingdom) Team JVA	12	(United Kingdom) Robbie Kerr	6
(Italy) Pro Motorsport	14	(Italy) Massimiliano Busnelli	All
(Italy) Pro Motorsport	15	(Italy) Ignazio Belluardo	All
(Italy) Pro Motorsport	24	(Brazil) João Barion	8
(Italy) System Team	16	(Italy) Sergio Ghiotto	1-7
(United Kingdom) Carlin Motorsport	18	(Lebanon) Khalil Beschir	2-6
(United Kingdom) Carlin Motorsport	19	(Lebanon) Basil Shaaban	2-6
(Italy) I Motori di Carlotta	20	(Italy) Glauco Solieri	2-4
(Italy) Euronova Racing	22	(Italy) Luca di Cienzo	8

== Race calendar ==
Round	Location	Circuit	Date	Pole position	Fastest lap	Winning driver	Winning team
1	Campagnano di Roma, Italy	ACI Vallelunga Circuit	10 April	(Austria) Norbert Siedler	(Germany) Timo Lienemann	(Germany) Timo Lienemann	(Italy) Draco Junior Team
2	Imola, Italy	Autodromo Enzo e Dino Ferrari	15 May	(Austria) Norbert Siedler	(Austria) Norbert Siedler	(Austria) Norbert Siedler	(Italy) ADM Motorsport
3	Stavelot, Belgium	Circuit de Spa-Francorchamps	12 June	(Austria) Norbert Siedler	(Austria) Norbert Siedler	(Austria) Norbert Siedler	(Italy) ADM Motorsport
4	Scarperia e San Piero, Italy	Mugello Circuit	10 July	(Italy) Massimiliano Busnelli	(Italy) Massimiliano Busnelli	(Italy) Massimiliano Busnelli	(Italy) Pro Motorsport
5	Misano Adriatico, Italy	Misano World Circuit	24 July	(Italy) Massimiliano Busnelli	(Austria) Norbert Siedler	(Italy) Alessandro Bonetti	(Italy) Draco Junior Team
6	Klettwitz, Germany	EuroSpeedway Lausitz	28 August	(United Kingdom) Robbie Kerr	(United Kingdom) Robbie Kerr	(United Kingdom) Robbie Kerr	(United Kingdom) Team JVA
7	Adria, Italy	Adria International Raceway	25 September	(Austria) Norbert Siedler	(Germany) Timo Lienemann	(Germany) Timo Lienemann	(Italy) Draco Junior Team
8	Monza, Italy	Autodromo Nazionale Monza	9 October	(Austria) Norbert Siedler	(Germany) Timo Lienemann	(Italy) Massimiliano Busnelli	(Italy) Pro Motorsport

== Championship Standings ==
=== Drivers ===
Points were awarded to the top eight classified finishers using the following structure:

Position	1st	2nd	3rd	4th	5th	6th	7th	8th
Points	10	8	6	5	4	3	2	1

Pos	Driver	VLL (Italy)	IMO (Italy)	SPA (Belgium)	MUG (Italy)	MIS (Italy)	LAU (Germany)	ADR (Italy)	MNZ (Italy)	Pts
1	(Italy) Massimiliano Busnelli	Ret	2	2	1	10	4	2	1	49
2	(Austria) Norbert Siedler	Ret	1	1	2	2	Ret	4	2	49
3	(Germany) Timo Lienemann	1	3	Ret	4	9	2	1	3	41
4	(Italy) Alessandro Bonetti	Ret	5	7	3	1	3	3	4	39
5	(Thailand) Tor Graves	4	14	3	6	7	Ret	6	5	23
6	(Italy) Marco Mocci	6	4	6	4	6		5	Ret	23
7	(Italy) Fausto Ippoliti	2	8	Ret	Ret	3	Ret	Ret	7	17
8	(Netherlands) Olivier Tielemans	5	15	5	5	5	Ret		9	16
9	(Italy) Ignazio Belluardo	8	7	Ret	7	4	7	Ret	11	12
10	(United Kingdom) Dominik Jackson	3		4						11
11	(United Kingdom) Robbie Kerr						1			10
12	(Italy) Sergio Ghiotto	10	Ret	10	9	Ret	6	7		5
13	(Lebanon) Khalil Beschir		12	9	12	Ret	5			4
14	(United Kingdom) Scott Mansell		6							3
15	(Italy) Davide Valsecchi								6	3
16	(France) Jean de Pourtales	7	13	8	Ret					3
17	(Italy) Matteo Pellegrino					8				1
18	(Italy) Luca di Cienzo								8	1
19	(Lebanon) Basil Shaaban		9	Ret	10	Ret	Ret			0
20	(Italy) Stefano Attianese	9	11							0
21	(Italy) Glauco Solieri		10	11	11					0
22	(Russia) Sergey Zlobin								10	0
	(Italy) Nino Famà						Ret			0
	(Austria) Franz Wöss						Ret			0
	(Brazil) João Barion								Ret	0
	(Russia) Daniil Move								Ret	0
Pos	Driver	VLL (Italy)	IMO (Italy)	SPA (Belgium)	MUG (Italy)	MIS (Italy)	LAU (Germany)	ADR (Italy)	MNZ (Italy)	Pts

Colour	Result
Gold	Winner
Silver	Second place
Bronze	Third place
Green	Points classification
Blue	Non-points classification
Blue	Non-classified finish (NC)
Purple	Retired, not classified (Ret)
Red	Did not qualify (DNQ)
Red	Did not pre-qualify (DNPQ)
Black	Disqualified (DSQ)
White	Did not start (DNS)
White	Withdrew (WD)
White	Race cancelled (C)
Blank	Did not practice (DNP)
Blank	Did not arrive (DNA)
Blank	Excluded (EX)

=== Teams ===
Pos	Driver	VLL (Italy)	IMO (Italy)	SPA (Belgium)	MUG (Italy)	MIS (Italy)	LAU (Germany)	ADR (Italy)	MNZ (Italy)	Pts
1	(Italy) Draco Junior Team	1	3	Ret	4	9	2	1	3	80
1	(Italy) Draco Junior Team	Ret	5	7	3	1	3	3	4	80
2	(Italy) ADM Motorsport	2	8	Ret	Ret	3	Ret	Ret	7	69
2	(Italy) ADM Motorsport	Ret	1	1	2	2	Ret	4	2	69
3	(Italy) Pro Motorsport	Ret	2	2	1	Ret	4	2	1	61
3	(Italy) Pro Motorsport	8	7	Ret	7	4	7	Ret	11	61
4	(United Kingdom) Team JVA	4	14	3	6	7	Ret	6	5	47
4	(United Kingdom) Team JVA	3	6	4			1			47
5	(Italy) CEK Team	6	4	6	4	6		5	Ret	23
5	(Italy) CEK Team								10	23
6	(Italy) Scuderia Famà	5	15	5	5	5	Ret		9	20
6	(Italy) Scuderia Famà	7	13	8	Ret	8	Ret		Ret	20
7	(Italy) System Team	10	Ret	10	9	Ret	6	7		5
8	(United Kingdom) Carlin Motorsport		12	9	12	Ret	5			4
8	(United Kingdom) Carlin Motorsport		9	Ret	10	Ret	Ret			4
9	(Italy) Euronova Racing								8	1
10	(Italy) I Motori di Carlotta		10	11	11					0
Pos	Driver	VLL (Italy)	IMO (Italy)	SPA (Belgium)	MUG (Italy)	MIS (Italy)	LAU (Germany)	ADR (Italy)	MNZ (Italy)	Pts

Colour	Result
Gold	Winner
Silver	Second place
Bronze	Third place
Green	Points classification
Blue	Non-points classification
Blue	Non-classified finish (NC)
Purple	Retired, not classified (Ret)
Red	Did not qualify (DNQ)
Red	Did not pre-qualify (DNPQ)
Black	Disqualified (DSQ)
White	Did not start (DNS)
White	Withdrew (WD)
White	Race cancelled (C)
Blank	Did not practice (DNP)
Blank	Did not arrive (DNA)
Blank	Excluded (EX)
