= ADM Motorsport =

Italian motorsports team

(Italy) ADM Motorsport
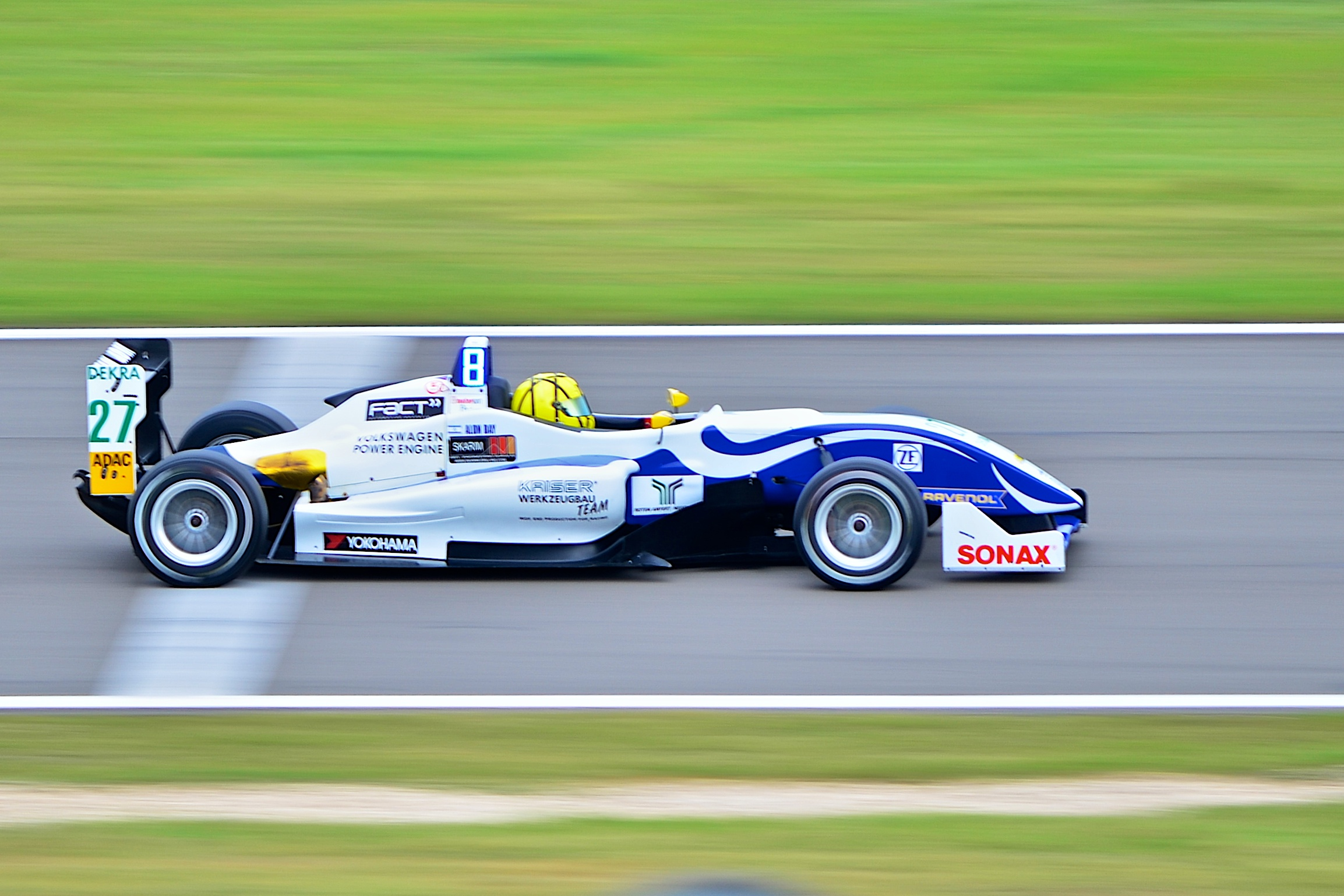
- Founded: 1988
- Team principal(s): Renato Melchioretto
- Former series: Euro Formula 3000; Italian Formula 3 International Formula Master; British Formula 3 German Formula 3 Italian Formula 4
- Drivers' Championships: Formula Panda; 1989: Marco Baroncini

ADM Motorsport are an Italian motorsports team, currently competing in the International Formula Master series, though they have also competed in Euro Formula 3000 and Formula Three.

== History ==
=== Birth and Formula Panda ===
The team was founded in 1988 by Renato Melchioretto when he manufactured his first racing car, the ADM Formula Panda.

Since the debut, the car was fast and at the end of its first racing season, it was 2nd in the final standings of the Trofeo Cadetti Agip of Formula Panda with Alessandro Aghernio as the driver.

1989 brought more success as Marco Baroncini won them the Formula Panda Italian Championship while Oliverio Saleri won the Trofeo Cadetti Agip.

=== Formula 3 and Formula Boxer ===
In 1991 ADM began to race in the Italian Formula 3 with three Dallara cars winning the championship in 1992 with Saleri.

1993 saw the team move to Formula Europa Boxer, the team was directly involved in design and manufacture of its own cars.

In 1994 ADM lined up two cars in the Formula Boxer resulting in three wins and two 2nd places. They also won the Greek Formula 3 with Manolis Moschous.

They continued in Greek Formula 3 until 1998 with Moschous still driving, winning the championship in 1995, 1996 and 1998. In addition they also ventured into the Hungarian Formula 3 championship with Claudia Steffek finishing 2nd in the championship.

=== Italian and Euro Formula 3000 ===
ADM Motorsport began competing in the new Italian Formula 3000 championship in 1999. Italian, Cesare Manfredini began the season as their driver but was replaced midseason by Greek driver, Nikolas Stremmeneos. The team came 10th in the teams championship with 2 points.

The team vastly improved their results in 2000, winning the drivers championship with Ricardo Sperafico. A second car was also added with Paolo Ruberti, Salvatore Tavano and Tomas Scheckter sharing the car. ADM came 2nd in the team's championship losing out by only 5 points to Arden Team Russia.

Brazilian, Vítor Meira lead the team in the 2001 Euro F3000 though he failed to continue Sperafico's championship winning ways, only finishing 5th in the driver's championship. Once again the second car saw an assortment of drivers with Matteo Santoponte, Gabriele Varano and Sergei Zlobin all sharing the car. ADM dropped back down to 5th in the team's championship.

Meira continued with the team in 2002 but got replaced midseason by Leonardo Nienkotter who in turn was replaced by Gianmaria Bruni. Armin Pornbacher raced in the second car but never managed to score. It was a disappointing season as no points were scored by any of the drivers.

2003 saw a return to form for the team with Gianmaria Bruni returning for five races with the team, winning three of them on his way to 3rd in the drivers championship. Rafaele Sperafico was his teammate but he only scored two points and was replaced for the last two races by Jaime Melo who won the season finale. ADM would finish 2nd in the teams championship.

For 2004 the team took on Norbert Siedler and Allam Khodair. Siedler converted two of his five pole positions into wins on his way to 3rd in the drivers championship. Khodair on the other hand only managed one point dragging the team down to 4th in the team's championship.

=== International Formula Master ===
In 2005 the team switched to the new 3000 Pro Series. Norbert Siedler continued with the team with Fausto Ippoliti as his teammate. A third part-time car was added with Stefano Attianese, Franz Woss and Davide Valsecchi all running at least one race. Siedler tied for the drivers championship with Max Busnelli in a unique situation where not only the two drivers scored the same number of points but had also had an exact same record of race results over the 8 race championship. Ippoliti meanwhile finished 7th in the championship while ADM were again runners up in the team's championship.

2006 saw the 3000 Pro Series rebranded as the F3000 International Masters championship. The team ran three full-time cars. Fausto Ippoliti continued with the team alongside Daniil Move and Luca Persiani. Ippoliti however would be replaced by Alessandro Pier Guidi after one round with Tor Graves taking over from round 3 at Brands Hatch. Daniil Move would also be replaced by Dominik Schraml midseason. Persiani scored the team's only win of the season on his way to 4th in the drivers championship. ADM came 3rd in the teams championship.

In 2007 the F3000 formula was dropped and rebranded as the International Formula Master series. ADM started the season with 4 cars driven by Frankie Provenzano, Michele Caliendo, Nick de Brujin and Dominick Schraml. However one car was dropped after three rounds after Schraml left while de Brujin was replaced by a returning Norbert Siedler. Siedler would earn two wins on his way to 6th in the championship easily outclassing Provenzano and Caliendo. ADM came 5th in the teams championship.

In 2008 Siedler, Provenzano and Caliendo were joined by Octavio Fretias. However, only Caliendo finished the season with the team. Davide Rigon, Tomas Pivoda, Earl Bamber and Federico Scionti also ran for the team later in the season. Siedler was again the team's highest ranked driver in 10th though Bamber managed 15th in the championship despite only running one round after winning the team's only win of the season in one of the two races. ADM only managed 6th in the teams championship.

Bamber returned for the 2009 season with Marcello Puglisi as his teammate. Unfortunately the team only lasted two rounds with Harald Schlegelmilch replacing Puglisi for the second round. As a result, the team were only 8th in the teams championship having scored just 4 points. It is unknown whether they will return for the 2010 season.

== Former series results ==
=== Italian Formula 4 ===
Italian F4 Championship
Year	Car	Drivers	Races	Wins	Poles	F/Laps	Points	D.C.	T.C.
2016	Tatuus F4-T014	(Brazil) Mauro Auricchio	9	0	0	0	2	31st	16th
2017	Tatuus F4-T014	(Brazil) Mauro Auricchio	0	0	0	0	2	NC†	NC
2017	Tatuus F4-T014	(Germany) Andreas Estner	3	0	0	0	0	NC†	NC
2017	Tatuus F4-T014	(Italy) Diego Bertonelli	3	0	0	0	2	NC†	NC

To be able to compete in the main classification, drivers were obliged to compete in five rounds at least, one of these rounds should be the finale at Monza.

=== 3000 Pro Series/International Formula Master ===
3000 Pro Series
Year	Drivers	Races	Wins	Poles	F/Laps	Points	D.C.	T.C.
2005	(Italy) Fausto Ippoliti	8	0	0	0	17	7th	2nd
2005	(Austria) Norbert Siedler	8	2	5	0	49	1st	2nd
2005	(Italy) Stefano Attianese	2	0	0	0	0	20th	2nd
2005	(Austria) Franz Wöss	1	0	0	0	0	26th	2nd
2005	(Italy) Davide Valsecchi	1	0	0	0	3	15th	2nd
F3000 International Masters
2006	(Russia) Daniil Move	7	0	0	0	11	17th	3rd
2006	(Germany) Dominik Schraml	3	0	0	0	8	20th	3rd
2006	(Italy) Fausto Ippoliti	2	0	0	0	5	21st	3rd
2006	(Italy) Alessandro Pier Guidi	4	0	1	0	13	14th	3rd
2006	(Thailand) Tor Graves	11	0	0	0	15	13th	3rd
2006	(Italy) Luca Persiani	15	1	2	1	52	4th	3rd
International Formula Master
2007	(Italy) Frankie Provenzano	12	0	0	0	7	20th	5th
2007	(Italy) Michele Caliendo	15	0	0	0	0	31st	5th
2007	(Netherlands) Nick de Bruijn	6	0	0	0	7	21st	5th
2007	(Germany) Dominik Schraml	6	0	0	0	0	32nd	5th
2007	(Austria) Norbert Siedler	10	2	0	0	40	6th	5th
2008	(Italy) Davide Rigon	2	0	0	0	0	29th	6th
2008	(Czech Republic) Tomas Pivoda	8	0	0	0	0	33rd†	6th
2008	(New Zealand) Earl Bamber	2	1	0	0	12	15th	6th
2008	(Brazil) Octavio Freitas	6	0	0	0	0	40th	6th
2008	(Austria) Norbert Siedler	12	0	0	2	22	10th†	6th
2008	(Italy) Federico Scionti	2	0	0	0	0	39th	6th
2008	(Italy) Frankie Provenzano	6	0	0	0	7	20th†	6th
2008	(Italy) Michele Caliendo	16	0	0	0	2	25th	6th
2009	(Latvia) Harald Schlegelmilch	2	0	0	0	3	16th†	8th
2009	(New Zealand) Earl Bamber	4	0	0	0	2	18th	8th
2009	(Italy) Marcello Puglisi	2	0	0	0	1	19th	8th

† Shared results with other teams

=== German Formula 3 ===
German Formula Three Championship
Year	Car	Drivers	Races	Wins	Poles	F/Laps	Points	D.C.	T.C.
2012	Dallara F308-VW Power Engine	(Israel) Alon Day	12	0	0	0	48	11th†	N/A
2013	Dallara F308-VW Power Engine	(Italy) Matteo Cairoli	26	0	0	0	112	7th	4th
2013	Dallara F308-VW Power Engine	(Poland) Tomasz Krzeminski	8	0	0	0	69	9th	4th
2013	Dallara F308-VW Power Engine	(Italy) Luca Iannaccone	3	0	0	0	0	22nd†	4th
2013	Dallara F308-VW Power Engine	(Russia) Nikita Zlobin	9	0	0	0	3	20th	4th
2014	Dallara F308-Volkswagen	(China) Kang Ling [G]	5	0	0	1	0	NC‡	NC
2014	Dallara F308-Volkswagen	(United Kingdom) Dino Zamparelli [G]	3	0	0	0	0	NC‡	NC
2014	Dallara F308-Volkswagen	(Brazil) Luís Felipe Derani [G]	3	0	0	0	0	NC‡	NC
2014	Dallara F308-Volkswagen	(Russia) Konstantin Tereshchenko [G]	3	0	0	0	0	NC‡	NC
2014	Dallara F308-Volkswagen	(Russia) Sergey Trofimov	3	0	0	0	12	11th	5th
2014	Dallara F308-Volkswagen	(Russia) Nikita Zlobin	22	0	0	0	109	8th	5th

† – Shared results with other teams ‡ – Guest driver – ineligible for points.

=== British Formula 3 ===
British Formula Three Championship
Year	Car	Drivers	Races	Wins	Poles	F/Laps	Points	D.C.
2014	Dallara F308-Volkswagen	(China) Kang Ling	3	0	0	0	5	17th
2014	Dallara F308-Volkswagen	(Russia) Nikita Zlobin	3	0	0	0	6	16th

== Timeline ==
Former series
Formula Panda	1988-1990
Italian Formula Three Championship	1991-1992
Formula Europa Boxer	1993-1994
Greek Formula 3	1994-1998
Hungarian Formula 3	1998
Euro Formula 3000	1999-2004
International Formula Master	2005-2009
German Formula Three Championship	2012-2014
British Formula 3 International Series	2014
Italian F4 Championship	2016-2017
