= 2009 Formula Renault 3.5 Series =

Seasons
- ← 2008 2010 →

The 2009 Formula Renault 3.5 Series was the fifth Formula Renault 3.5 Series season. It began on 18 April at the Circuit de Catalunya and finished on 25 October at the brand-new Ciudad del Motor de Aragón in Alcañiz. It was the fifth season of the Renault-backed single-seater category. International DracoRacing driver Bertrand Baguette won the championship by a comfortable margin, having dominated the second half of the season. His team won their respective championship, ahead of Carlin Motorsport.

== Regulation Changes ==
=== Technical ===
After debuting in the 2008 season, the aerodynamics of the current Dallara chassis underwent "minor enhancements inspired by the 2009 F1 regulations".

=== Sporting ===
A number of changes were made to the sporting regulations in order to reduce costs and better showcase drivers' talent:

- The Thursday test sessions at each meeting were scrapped, replaced with two one-hour sessions on the Friday.
- The duration of each race was extended to 44 minutes + one lap.
- A bonus point was awarded to the driver who climbed the most places during each race.

In addition, at the halfway point of the season (after the Hungaroring round) the championship leader got the opportunity to demonstrate a Renault R28 F1 car at a World Series meeting. After the seventh race of the season both Marcos Martínez and Bertrand Baguette were tied at the top of the standings, but by virtue of his three race wins, Martínez received the prize drive during the next round at Silverstone.

And just like in previous years, the eventual champion earned a full test with the ING Renault F1 team at the end of the season. Baguette won the title at the Nürburgring, to earn that test with the team.

== Teams and drivers ==
R = Series rookie for 2009

Team	No.	Driver name	Status	Rounds
(France) Tech 1 Racing	1	(New Zealand) Brendon Hartley	R	1–5, 8–9
(France) Tech 1 Racing	1	(Italy) Edoardo Mortara	R	6
(France) Tech 1 Racing	1	(Australia) Daniel Ricciardo	R	7
(France) Tech 1 Racing	2	(France) Charles Pic		All
(United Kingdom) Ultimate Motorsport	3	(United Kingdom) Greg Mansell	R	1–7
(United Kingdom) Ultimate Motorsport	4	(Spain) Miguel Molina		1–7
(United Kingdom) P1 Motorsport	5	(United Kingdom) James Walker		All
(United Kingdom) P1 Motorsport	6	(Russia) Daniil Move		All
(Italy) Prema Powerteam	7	(Colombia) Omar Leal	R	All
(Italy) Prema Powerteam	8	(Italy) Frankie Provenzano	R	1–2
(Italy) Prema Powerteam	8	(Monaco) Stefano Coletti	R	3
(Italy) Prema Powerteam	8	(Czech Republic) Filip Salaquarda	R	4–9
(United Kingdom) Carlin Motorsport	9	(United Kingdom) Oliver Turvey	R	All
(United Kingdom) Carlin Motorsport	10	(Spain) Jaime Alguersuari	R	All
(Portugal) International DracoRacing	11	(Belgium) Bertrand Baguette		All
(Portugal) International DracoRacing	12	(Spain) Marco Barba		All
(Austria) Interwetten.com Racing	15	(Romania) Mihai Marinescu	R	1, 3, 6, 8–9
(Austria) Interwetten.com Racing	15	(Germany) Tobias Hegewald	R	2
(Austria) Interwetten.com Racing	15	(Romania) Michael Herck		4–5, 7
(Austria) Interwetten.com Racing	16	(South Africa) Adrian Zaugg		1–6
(Austria) Interwetten.com Racing	16	(Mexico) Salvador Durán		8–9
(United Kingdom) Comtec Racing	17	(Russia) Anton Nebylitskiy	R	1–2
(United Kingdom) Comtec Racing	17	(Australia) John Martin	R	3–5, 8
(United Kingdom) Comtec Racing	17	(South Africa) Cristiano Morgado	R	6
(United Kingdom) Comtec Racing	17	(Brazil) Alberto Valerio		7
(United Kingdom) Comtec Racing	17	(United Kingdom) Greg Mansell	R	9
(United Kingdom) Comtec Racing	18	(Latvia) Harald Schlegelmilch	R	1
(United Kingdom) Comtec Racing	18	(France) Alexandre Marsoin		2
(United Kingdom) Comtec Racing	18	(United Kingdom) Max Chilton	R	3
(United Kingdom) Comtec Racing	18	(United Kingdom) Jon Lancaster	R	4–9
(United Kingdom) Mofaz Fortec Motorsport (United Kingdom) Mofaz Racing	19	(Malaysia) Fairuz Fauzy		All
(United Kingdom) Mofaz Fortec Motorsport (United Kingdom) Mofaz Racing	20	(Estonia) Sten Pentus	R	All
(Spain) Epsilon Euskadi	21	(Spain) Adrián Vallés		1–5
(Spain) Epsilon Euskadi	21	(Spain) Dani Clos	R	6–7
(Spain) Epsilon Euskadi	21	(Japan) Keisuke Kunimoto	R	8–9
(Spain) Epsilon Euskadi	22	(New Zealand) Chris van der Drift	R	All
(Spain) Pons Racing	23	(Spain) Marcos Martínez		All
(Spain) Pons Racing	24	(Italy) Federico Leo	R	All
(France) KMP Group/SG Formula	25	(Russia) Anton Nebylitskiy	R	3–9
(France) KMP Group/SG Formula	26	(France) Jules Bianchi	R	3
(France) KMP Group/SG Formula	26	(Italy) Edoardo Mortara	R	4
(France) KMP Group/SG Formula	26	(France) Guillaume Moreau		5–9
(Italy) RC Motorsport	27	(Czech Republic) Filip Salaquarda	R	3
(Italy) RC Motorsport	27	(Romania) Mihai Marinescu	R	4
(Italy) RC Motorsport	27	(Argentina) Esteban Guerrieri		9
(Italy) RC Motorsport	28	(Italy) Pasquale Di Sabatino		1–8
(Italy) RC Motorsport	28	(Spain) Bruno Méndez	R	9

- KTR were due to race with car numbers 25 and 26, however the team pulled out on 1 April 2009 after team boss Kurt Mollekens stated that he was unable to secure a driver line-up for the season. It was announced on 14 May 2009 that KMP Group/SG Formula will take up their entries.

=== Driver changes ===
Changed Teams

- Pasquale Di Sabatino: Red Devil Team Comtec → RC Motorsport
- Esteban Guerrieri: Ultimate Motorsport → RC Motorsport
- Alexandre Marsoin: Epsilon Euskadi → Comtec Racing
- Miguel Molina: Prema Powerteam → Ultimate Motorsport
- Daniil Move: KTR → P1 Motorsport
- Sten Pentus: Red Devil Team Comtec → Mofaz Fortec Motorsport
- James Walker: Fortec Motorsport → P1 Motorsport

Entering/Re-Entering FR3.5

- Jaime Alguersuari: British F3 (Carlin Motorsport) → Carlin Motorsport
- Jules Bianchi: Formula Three Euroseries (ART Grand Prix) → KMP Group/SG Formula
- Max Chilton: British F3 (Carlin Motorsport) → Comtec Racing
- Dani Clos: GP2 Series (Racing Engineering) → Epsilon Euskadi
- Stefano Coletti: Formula Three Euroseries (Prema Powerteam) → Prema Powerteam
- Chris van der Drift: International Formula Master (JD Motorsport) → Epsilon Euskadi
- Salvador Durán: A1 Grand Prix (A1 Team Mexico) → Interwetten.com
- Brendon Hartley: British F3 (Carlin Motorsport) → Tech 1 Racing
- Tobias Hegewald: Eurocup Formula Renault 2.0 (Motopark Academy) → Interwetten.com
- Michael Herck: GP2 Series (DPR) → Interwetten.com
- Keisuke Kunimoto: Formula Nippon (Team LeMans) → Epsilon Euskadi
- Jon Lancaster: Formula Three Euroseries (ART Grand Prix) → Comtec Racing
- Omar Leal: Euroseries 3000 (Durango) → Prema Powerteam
- Federico Leo: ATS Formel 3 Cup (Ombra Racing) → Pons Racing
- Mihai Marinescu: Formula BMW Europe (FMS International) → Interwetten.com/RC Motorsport
- John Martin: A1 Grand Prix (A1 Team Australia)/British F3 (Räikkönen Robertson Racing) → Comtec Racing
- Greg Mansell: Atlantic Championship (Walker Racing) → USR/Comtec Racing
- Bruno Méndez: European F3 Open Championship (Campos Racing) → RC Motorsport
- Guillaume Moreau: FIA GT Championship (Luc Alphand Aventures) → KMP Group/SG Formula
- Cristiano Morgado: Formula Volkswagen (Morgado Racing) → Comtec Racing
- Edoardo Mortara: GP2 Series (Arden International) → KMP Group/SG Formula & Tech 1 Racing
- Anton Nebylitskiy: Eurocup Formula Renault 2.0 (SG Drivers' Project) → Comtec Racing & KMP Group/SG Formula
- Frankie Provenzano: International Formula Master (ADM Motorsport) → Prema Powerteam
- Daniel Ricciardo: British F3 (Carlin Motorsport) → Tech 1 Racing
- Filip Salaquarda: International Formula Master (ISR Racing) → RC Motorsport
- Harald Schlegelmilch: International Formula Master (Trident Racing) → Comtec Racing
- Oliver Turvey: British F3 (Carlin Motorsport) → Carlin Motorsport
- Alberto Valerio: GP2 Series (Piquet GP) → Comtec Racing
- Adrián Vallés: GP2 Series (BCN Competicion) → Epsilon Euskadi
- Adrian Zaugg: A1 Grand Prix (A1 Team South Africa) → Interwetten.com

Leaving FR3.5

- Mikhail Aleshin: Carlin Motorsport → FIA Formula Two Championship
- Borja García: RC Motorsport → Atlantic Championship (Condor Motorsports)
- Giedo van der Garde: P1 Motorsport → GP2 Series (iSport International)
- Julien Jousse: Tech 1 Racing → FIA Formula Two Championship
- Pippa Mann: P1 Motorsport → Indy Lights (Panther Racing)
- Mario Romancini: Epsilon Euskadi → Indy Lights (RLR/Andersen Racing)
- Duncan Tappy: RC Motorsport → Indy Lights (Genoa Racing)
- Robert Wickens: Carlin Motorsport → FIA Formula Two Championship

== Race calendar and results ==
Seven rounds formed meetings of the 2009 World Series by Renault season, with additional rounds supporting the Monaco Grand Prix and the 1000 km of Algarve.

Round		Circuit	Date	Pole position	Fastest lap	Winning driver	Winning team	Rookie winner
1	R1	(Spain) Circuit de Catalunya, Barcelona	18 April	(Spain) Adrián Vallés	(Spain) Miguel Molina	(Spain) Marcos Martínez	(Spain) Pons Racing	(United Kingdom) Oliver Turvey
1	R2	(Spain) Circuit de Catalunya, Barcelona	19 April	(France) Charles Pic	(France) Charles Pic	(Spain) Marcos Martínez	(Spain) Pons Racing	(Estonia) Sten Pentus
2	R1	(Belgium) Circuit de Spa-Francorchamps	2 May	(Spain) Marco Barba	(Belgium) Bertrand Baguette	(Spain) Marcos Martínez	(Spain) Pons Racing	(United Kingdom) Oliver Turvey
2	R2	(Belgium) Circuit de Spa-Francorchamps	3 May	(Belgium) Bertrand Baguette	(United Kingdom) James Walker	(United Kingdom) James Walker	(United Kingdom) P1 Motorsport	(Spain) Jaime Alguersuari
3		Circuit de Monaco, Monte Carlo	24 May	(United Kingdom) Oliver Turvey	(New Zealand) Brendon Hartley	(United Kingdom) Oliver Turvey	(United Kingdom) Carlin Motorsport	(United Kingdom) Oliver Turvey
4	R1	(Hungary) Hungaroring, Budapest	13 June	(Malaysia) Fairuz Fauzy	(New Zealand) Brendon Hartley	(Malaysia) Fairuz Fauzy	(United Kingdom) Mofaz Fortec Motorsport	(Spain) Jaime Alguersuari
4	R2	(Hungary) Hungaroring, Budapest	14 June	(Spain) Marcos Martínez	(Malaysia) Fairuz Fauzy	(Italy) Pasquale Di Sabatino	(Italy) RC Motorsport	(Colombia) Omar Leal
5	R1	(United Kingdom) Silverstone Circuit	4 July	(Belgium) Bertrand Baguette	(United Kingdom) Jon Lancaster	(Spain) Marcos Martínez	(Spain) Pons Racing	(United Kingdom) Oliver Turvey
5	R2	(United Kingdom) Silverstone Circuit	5 July	(France) Charles Pic	(France) Charles Pic	(France) Charles Pic	(France) Tech 1 Racing	(United Kingdom) Oliver Turvey
6	R1	(France) Bugatti Circuit, Le Mans	18 July	(Spain) Marco Barba	(Belgium) Bertrand Baguette	(Belgium) Bertrand Baguette	(Portugal) International DracoRacing	(United Kingdom) Oliver Turvey
6	R2	(France) Bugatti Circuit, Le Mans	19 July	(United Kingdom) Jon Lancaster	(Spain) Miguel Molina	(Belgium) Bertrand Baguette	(Portugal) International DracoRacing	(Spain) Jaime Alguersuari
7	R1	(Portugal) Autódromo Internacional do Algarve, Portimão	1 August	(United Kingdom) Jon Lancaster	(France) Charles Pic	(United Kingdom) Jon Lancaster	(United Kingdom) Comtec Racing	(United Kingdom) Jon Lancaster
7	R2	(Portugal) Autódromo Internacional do Algarve, Portimão	1 August	(Spain) Jaime Alguersuari	(Spain) Jaime Alguersuari	(Spain) Jaime Alguersuari	(United Kingdom) Carlin Motorsport	(Spain) Jaime Alguersuari
8	R1	(Germany) Nürburgring	19 September	(Russia) Daniil Move	(United Kingdom) Jon Lancaster	(Belgium) Bertrand Baguette	(Portugal) International DracoRacing	(United Kingdom) Oliver Turvey
8	R2	(Germany) Nürburgring	20 September	(New Zealand) Brendon Hartley	(New Zealand) Brendon Hartley	(France) Charles Pic	(France) Tech 1 Racing	(New Zealand) Brendon Hartley
9	R1	(Spain) Ciudad del Motor de Aragón, Alcañiz	24 October	(United Kingdom) Oliver Turvey	(Argentina) Esteban Guerrieri	(Belgium) Bertrand Baguette	(Portugal) International DracoRacing	(United Kingdom) Oliver Turvey
9	R2	(Spain) Ciudad del Motor de Aragón, Alcañiz	25 October	(Malaysia) Fairuz Fauzy	(United Kingdom) James Walker	(Belgium) Bertrand Baguette	(Portugal) International DracoRacing	(United Kingdom) Oliver Turvey

== Season results ==
- Points for both championships are awarded as follows:

Race											Qualifying		
Position	1st	2nd	3rd	4th	5th	6th	7th	8th	9th	10th	PP	2nd	3rd
**Sprint**	12	10	8	7	6	5	4	3	2	1			
**Feature**	15	12	10	8	6	5	4	3	2	1	**4**	2	1

In addition, a bonus point will be awarded to the driver who climbs the most places in the race order during each race.

The maximum number of points a driver can earn each weekend (except Monaco) is 32 and the maximum number for a team is 57. At Monaco and Portimão, a different point system was implemented, with the qualifying points awarded to each group as there is no Super Pole session.

=== Drivers' Championship ===
Pos	Driver	CAT SPR (Spain)	CAT FEA (Spain)	SPA SPR (Belgium)	SPA FEA (Belgium)	MON FEA (Monaco)	HUN SPR (Hungary)	HUN FEA (Hungary)	SIL SPR (United Kingdom)	SIL FEA (United Kingdom)	BUG SPR (France)	BUG FEA (France)	ALG SPR (Portugal)	ALG FEA (Portugal)	NÜR SPR (Germany)	NÜR FEA (Germany)	ARA SPR (Spain)	ARA FEA (Spain)	Points
1	(Belgium) Bertrand Baguette	2	Ret	2*	**2**^{1}	5	3	6	**8**	5	1	1	2	5^{2}	1	5	1	1	155
2	(Malaysia) Fairuz Fauzy	8	7	15	15	15	**1**	7	2	4	7	4	8*	20	2	3	6	**2**^{1}	98
3	(France) Charles Pic	DNS	**6**^{1}	4	Ret	9	11	8	7	**1**^{1}	6	Ret	4	2^{1}	6	1^{2}	13	11	94
4	(United Kingdom) Oliver Turvey	4	11	6	14	**1**^{1}	8	Ret	3	3	3	10^{3}	Ret	6^{2}	4	Ret^{3}	**2**	5	93
5	(United Kingdom) James Walker	6	Ret^{2}	Ret	1^{2}	3^{1}	4	Ret^{3}	4	2^{2}	Ret	9^{2}	6	8	Ret	4	18	9	89
6	(Spain) Jaime Alguersuari	5	16†	10	6	6	5	16	6	9	4	3	3	**1**^{1}	5	6	8	12	88
7	(Spain) Marcos Martínez	1	1	1	5	Ret^{2}	6	**Ret**^{1}	1	6	17	Ret	15	Ret	Ret	Ret	11	13	73
8	(Spain) Miguel Molina	9	14	3	3^{3}	4^{3}	7	Ret^{2}	9	Ret	9	2	7	4					64
9	(Spain) Marco Barba	Ret	Ret	**7**	12	16	2	2	10	10	**5**	7	16	11	8	7	14	6	50
10	(Russia) Daniil Move	14	12^{3}	5	4	Ret	12	9	18	8	11	19	Ret	10*	**3**	9	4	3	49
11	(New Zealand) Chris van der Drift	7	3	9	Ret	7	13*	4	Ret	19	15	11	Ret	7	14	10	9	8^{2}	41
12	(Italy) Pasquale Di Sabatino	11	8	8	8	Ret^{3}	14	1	Ret	Ret	2	8	14	18	10	Ret			39
13	(United Kingdom) Jon Lancaster						9	10	22	15	8	**5**^{1}	**1**	Ret	9	Ret	3	20^{3}	39
14	(South Africa) Adrian Zaugg	10*	5	12	7	2^{2}	10	Ret	13	11	Ret	15							27
15	(New Zealand) Brendon Hartley	12	9	11	10	17	17	12	5	13^{3}					13	**2**^{1}	15	16	26
16	(Estonia) Sten Pentus	18	2*	18	11*	11	18	15	14	7*	14	13	9	14	Ret	12	Ret	10*	23
17	(Spain) Adrián Vallés	**3**	4	DNS	Ret	8	16	Ret	12	14									19
18	(France) Guillaume Moreau								16*	12	13	12	5	3^{3}	11	Ret	19	18	18
19	(Argentina) Esteban Guerrieri																5*	4	15
20	(Colombia) Omar Leal	15	19†	19	18	14	22	3	17	16	Ret	20	18	17	17	14*	21	22†	11
21	(Italy) Federico Leo	19	18	17	17	18	Ret	14	15	21	18	Ret	13	19	18	17	7	7	8
22	(Australia) John Martin					12*	20	13	21	20					7	8			8
23	(Romania) Michael Herck						Ret	5*	20	18			19	Ret					7
24	(Italy) Edoardo Mortara						21	Ret			Ret	6*							6
25	(Spain) Dani Clos										10*	17	Ret	9^{3}					5
26	(United Kingdom) Greg Mansell	13	10	13	9	13	15	Ret	11	22	12	Ret	11	13			10	14	4
27	(Czech Republic) Filip Salaquarda					21	Ret	NC	19	17	Ret	16	10	12	Ret	Ret	12	15	1
28	(Monaco) Stefano Coletti					10													1
29	(Russia) Anton Nebylitskiy	17	17†	20	Ret	20	19	Ret	Ret	Ret	Ret	Ret	12	Ret	12*	11	Ret	Ret	1
30	(Romania) Mihai Marinescu	Ret	13			Ret	Ret	11			16	14			15	15	20	17	0
31	(Italy) Frankie Provenzano	Ret	15	16	13														0
32	(Japan) Keisuke Kunimoto														16	13	17	21	0
33	(Germany) Tobias Hegewald			14	16														0
34	(Australia) Daniel Ricciardo												Ret	15					0
35	(Mexico) Salvador Durán														DNS	16	16	Ret	0
36	(Brazil) Alberto Valerio												17	16					0
37	(Latvia) Harald Schlegelmilch	16	Ret																0
38	(South Africa) Cristiano Morgado										19	18							0
39	(Spain) Bruno Méndez																Ret	19	0
40	(United Kingdom) Max Chilton					19													0
	(France) Alexandre Marsoin			Ret	DNS														0
	(France) Jules Bianchi					Ret													0
Pos	Driver	CAT SPR (Spain)	CAT FEA (Spain)	SPA SPR (Belgium)	SPA FEA (Belgium)	MON FEA (Monaco)	HUN SPR (Hungary)	HUN FEA (Hungary)	SIL SPR (United Kingdom)	SIL FEA (United Kingdom)	BUG SPR (France)	BUG FEA (France)	ALG SPR (Portugal)	ALG FEA (Portugal)	NÜR SPR (Germany)	NÜR FEA (Germany)	ARA SPR (Spain)	ARA FEA (Spain)	Points

Colour	Result
Gold	Winner
Silver	Second place
Bronze	Third place
Green	Points classification
Blue	Non-points classification
Blue	Non-classified finish (NC)
Purple	Retired, not classified (Ret)
Red	Did not qualify (DNQ)
Red	Did not pre-qualify (DNPQ)
Black	Disqualified (DSQ)
White	Did not start (DNS)
White	Withdrew (WD)
White	Race cancelled (C)
Blank	Did not practice (DNP)
Blank	Did not arrive (DNA)
Blank	Excluded (EX)

**Bold** – Pole
Italics – Fastest Lap
† – Retired, but classified
* – Hard charger
1 – 3 Points for Pole
2 – 2 Points for P2
3 – 1 Point for P3

=== Teams' Championship ===
Pos	Team	Car No.	CAT SPR (Spain)	CAT FEA (Spain)	SPA SPR (Belgium)	SPA FEA (Belgium)	MON FEA (Monaco)	HUN SPR (Hungary)	HUN FEA (Hungary)	SIL SPR (United Kingdom)	SIL FEA (United Kingdom)	BUG SPR (France)	BUG FEA (France)	ALG SPR (Portugal)	ALG FEA (Portugal)	NÜR SPR (Germany)	NÜR FEA (Germany)	ARA SPR (Spain)	ARA FEA (Spain)	Points
1	(Portugal) International DracoRacing	11	2	Ret	2*	**2**	5	3	6	**8**	5	1*	1	2	5	1	5	1	1	205
1	(Portugal) International DracoRacing	12	Ret	Ret	**7**	12	16	2	2	10	10	**5**	7	16	11	8	7	14	6	205
2	(United Kingdom) Carlin Motorsport	9	4	11	6	14	**1**	8	Ret	3	3	3	10	Ret	6	4	Ret	**2**	5	181
2	(United Kingdom) Carlin Motorsport	10	5	16†	10	6	6	5	16	6	9	4	3	3	**1***	5	6	8	12	181
3	(United Kingdom) P1 Motorsport	5	6	Ret	Ret	1*	3	4	Ret	4	2	Ret	9	6	8	Ret	4	18	9*	138
3	(United Kingdom) P1 Motorsport	6	14	12	5	4	Ret	12	9	18	8	11	19	Ret	10	**3**	9	4	3	138
4	(France) Tech 1 Racing	1	12	9	11	10	17*	17*	12	5	13	Ret	6	Ret	15	13	**2***	15	16	126
4	(France) Tech 1 Racing	2	DNS	**6***	4	Ret	9	11	8	7	**1***	6	Ret	4	2	6	1	13	11	126
5	(United Kingdom) Mofaz Fortec Motorsport (United Kingdom) Mofaz Racing	19	8	7	15	15	15	**1**	7*	2	4	7	4	8	20	2	3	6	**2**	121
5	(United Kingdom) Mofaz Fortec Motorsport (United Kingdom) Mofaz Racing	20	18	2	18	11	11	18	15	14	7	14	13	9	14	Ret	12	Ret	10	121
6	(Spain) Pons Racing	23	1	1	1	5	Ret	6	**Ret**	1	6	17	Ret	15	Ret	Ret	Ret	11	13	81
6	(Spain) Pons Racing	24	19	18	17	17	18	Ret	14	15	21	18	Ret	13	19	18	17	7	7	81
7	(United Kingdom) Ultimate Motorsport	3	13	10	13	9	13	15	Ret	11	22	12	Ret	11	13					67
7	(United Kingdom) Ultimate Motorsport	4	9*	14	3	3	4	7	Ret	9	Ret	9	2*	7	4					67
8	(Spain) Epsilon Euskadi	21	**3**	4	DNS	Ret	8	16	Ret	12	14	10	17	Ret	9	16	13	17	21	65
8	(Spain) Epsilon Euskadi	22	7	3	9	Ret	7	13	4	Ret	19	15	11	Ret	7	14	10	9	8	65
9	(Italy) RC Motorsport	27					21	Ret	11									5*	4	54
9	(Italy) RC Motorsport	28	11	8	8	8	Ret	14	1	Ret	Ret	2	8	14	18	10	Ret	Ret	19	54
10	(United Kingdom) Comtec Racing	17	17	17†	20	Ret	12	20	13	21	20	19	18	17	16	7	8	10	14	48
10	(United Kingdom) Comtec Racing	18	16	Ret	Ret	DNS	19	9	10	22*	15	8	**5**	**1**	Ret	9*	Ret	3	20	48
11	(Austria) Interwetten.com	15	Ret	13	14	16	Ret	Ret	5	20	18	16	14	19	Ret	15	15	20	17	34
11	(Austria) Interwetten.com	16	10	5	12	7	2	10	Ret	13	11	Ret	15			DNS	16	16	Ret	34
12	(France) KMP Group/SG Formula	25					20	19	Ret	Ret	Ret	Ret	Ret	12	Ret	12	11	Ret	Ret	19
12	(France) KMP Group/SG Formula	26					Ret	21	Ret	16	12	13	12	5	3	11	Ret	19	18	19
13	(Italy) Prema Powerteam	7	15	19†	19	18	14	22	3	17	16	Ret	20	18	17	17	14	21	22†	13
13	(Italy) Prema Powerteam	8	Ret	15	16	13	10	Ret	NC	19	17	Ret	16	10	12	Ret	Ret	12	15	13
Pos	Team	Car No.	CAT SPR (Spain)	CAT FEA (Spain)	SPA SPR (Belgium)	SPA FEA (Belgium)	MON FEA (Monaco)	HUN SPR (Hungary)	HUN FEA (Hungary)	SIL SPR (United Kingdom)	SIL FEA (United Kingdom)	BUG SPR (France)	BUG FEA (France)	ALG SPR (Portugal)	ALG FEA (Portugal)	NÜR SPR (Germany)	NÜR FEA (Germany)	ARA SPR (Spain)	ARA FEA (Spain)	Points

Colour	Result
Gold	Winner
Silver	Second place
Bronze	Third place
Green	Points classification
Blue	Non-points classification
Blue	Non-classified finish (NC)
Purple	Retired, not classified (Ret)
Red	Did not qualify (DNQ)
Red	Did not pre-qualify (DNPQ)
Black	Disqualified (DSQ)
White	Did not start (DNS)
White	Withdrew (WD)
White	Race cancelled (C)
Blank	Did not practice (DNP)
Blank	Did not arrive (DNA)
Blank	Excluded (EX)

- Polesitter for feature race in **bold** and is awarded four points. Second and third placed drivers in the Super Pole session receive 2 & 1 points respectively.
- Driver with asterisk recorded fastest lap. No points are awarded.
- Driver who retired but was classified denoted by †.
- Driver who gained most positions in a race in italics, and is awarded one point.
