= 2006 F3000 International Masters =

Seasons
- ← 2005 2007 →

The 2006 F3000 International Masters season was the second International Formula Master series season. The season consisted of sixteen races at seven rounds, beginning on 1 April at the Autodromo Nazionale Monza and finishing on 22 October at the Autódromo do Estoril. 11 teams and 30 drivers competed. In this one-make formula all drivers had to utilize Lola chassis and Zytek engines.

== Teams and drivers ==
| Team | Chassis | No. | Driver | Rounds |
|---|---|---|---|---|
| (Italy) Pro Motorsport | B99/50 | 2 | (Italy) Davide di Benedetto | All |
| (Italy) Pro Motorsport | B99/50 | 3 | (Italy) Giovanni Tedeschi | All |
| (Italy) Pro Motorsport | B99/50 | 23 | (Italy) Marcello Puglisi | 5-7 |
| (Italy) Pro Motorsport | B99/50 | 40 | (Italy) Massimiliano Busnelli | 1 |
| (Italy) ADM Motorsport | B99/50 | 5 | (Russia) Daniil Move | 1-4 |
| (Italy) ADM Motorsport | B99/50 | 5 | (Germany) Dominik Schraml | 7 |
| (Italy) ADM Motorsport | B99/50 | 6 | (Italy) Fausto Ippoliti | 1 |
| (Italy) ADM Motorsport | B99/50 | 6 | (Italy) Alessandro Pier Guidi | 2 |
| (Italy) ADM Motorsport | B99/50 | 6 | (Thailand) Tor Graves | 3-7 |
| (Italy) ADM Motorsport | B99/50 | 7 | (Italy) Luca Persiani | All |
| (Italy) Alan Racing | B99/50 | 8 | (Italy) Marco Mocci | 1-5 |
| (Italy) Alan Racing | B99/50 | 9 | (Italy) Michele Merendino | 1 |
| (Italy) Alan Racing | B99/50 | 9 | (Italy) Marcello Puglisi | 3 |
| (Czech Republic) Charouz Racing System | B02/50 | 10 | (Czech Republic) Jaroslav Janiš | 1-3 |
| (Czech Republic) Charouz Racing System | B02/50 | 10 | (Czech Republic) Filip Salaquarda | 4 |
| (Czech Republic) Charouz Racing System | B02/50 | 10 | (Russia) Vitaly Petrov | 5 |
| (Czech Republic) Charouz Racing System | B02/50 | 10 | (Czech Republic) Tomáš Kostka | 6 |
| (Czech Republic) Charouz Racing System | B02/50 | 10 | (Brazil) Luiz Razia | 7 |
| (Czech Republic) Charouz Racing System | B02/50 | 11 | (Czech Republic) Jan Charouz | All |
| (Italy) Corbetta Competizioni | B99/50 | 12 | (Germany) Timo Lienemann | 1 |
| (Italy) Corbetta Competizioni | B99/50 | 18 | (Italy) Gian Maria Gabbiani | 3 |
| (Italy) Corbetta Competizioni | B99/50 | 28 | (Italy) Ignazio Belluardo | 3-4 |
| (Italy) Scuderia Bigazzi | B99/50 | 14 | (Italy) Gian Maria Gabbiani | 1 |
| (Italy) Scuderia Bigazzi | B99/50 | 14 | (Italy) Kristian Ghedina | 2-7 |
| (Italy) Scuderia Bigazzi | B99/50 | 15 | (Italy) Massimo Torre | All |
| (Italy) Scuderia Giudici | B99/50 | 16 | (Italy) Gianni Giudici | 1 |
| (Italy) Scuderia Giudici | B99/50 | 16 | (Italy) Michele Merendino | 2 |
| (Italy) Scuderia Giudici | B99/50 | 27 | (Spain) Emilio de Villota Jr. | 1-2 |
| (Italy) Scuderia Giudici | B99/50 | 28 | (Italy) Ignazio Belluardo | 1-2 |
| (Italy) Fortuna | B99/50 | 27 | (Spain) Emilio de Villota Jr. | 5, 7 |
| (Italy) Fortuna | B99/50 | 28 | (Italy) Ignazio Belluardo | 5-6 |
| (Italy) Fortuna | B99/50 | 40 | (Italy) Matteo Bobbi | 2 |
| (Italy) ADM Junior Team | B99/50 | 20 | (Italy) Alessandro Pier Guidi | 4 |
| (Italy) Scuderia Famà | B99/50 | 20 | (Italy) Giovanni Faraonio | 6-7 |
| (Italy) Scuderia Famà | B99/50 | 21 | (Italy) Michele Meredino | 3-7 |
| (Italy) Scuderia Famà | B99/50 | 22 | (France) Jean de Pourtales | 3, 5-7 |
| (Italy) Scuderia Famà | B99/50 | 22 | (Italy) Glauco Solieri | 4 |
| (Italy) Scuderia Famà | B99/50 | 25 | (Italy) Giandomenico Sposito | 7 |
| (Italy) Pro Motorsport by Fortuna | B99/50 | 40 | (Spain) Emilio de Villota Jr. | 3-4 |

== Race calendar ==
| Round | | Location | Circuit | Date | Pole position | Fastest lap | Winning driver | Winning team |
|---|---|---|---|---|---|---|---|---|
| 1 | R1 | Monza, Italy | Autodromo Nazionale Monza | 1 April | (Italy) Massimiliano Busnelli | (Czech Republic) Jaroslav Janiš | (Czech Republic) Jaroslav Janiš | (Czech Republic) Charouz Racing System |
| 1 | R2 | Monza, Italy | Autodromo Nazionale Monza | 2 April | | (Germany) Timo Lienemann | (Czech Republic) Jaroslav Janiš | (Czech Republic) Charouz Racing System |
| 2 | R1 | Magny-Cours, France | Circuit de Nevers Magny-Cours | 29 April | (Czech Republic) Jaroslav Janiš | (Czech Republic) Jaroslav Janiš | (Czech Republic) Jaroslav Janiš | (Czech Republic) Charouz Racing System |
| 2 | R2 | Magny-Cours, France | Circuit de Nevers Magny-Cours | 30 April | | (Czech Republic) Jaroslav Janiš | (Italy) Ignazio Belluardo | (Italy) Scuderia Giudici |
| 3 | R1 | West Kingsdown, United Kingdom | Brands Hatch | 20 May | (Czech Republic) Jaroslav Janiš | (Spain) Emilio de Villota Jr. | (Czech Republic) Jaroslav Janiš | (Czech Republic) Charouz Racing System |
| 3 | R2 | West Kingsdown, United Kingdom | Brands Hatch | 21 May | | (Czech Republic) Jaroslav Janiš | (Italy) Luca Persiani | (Italy) ADM Motorsport |
| 4 | R1 | Oschersleben, Germany | Motorsport Arena Oschersleben | 3 June | (Italy) Alessandro Pier Guidi | (Czech Republic) Filip Salaquarda | (Italy) Massimo Torre | (Italy) Scuderia Bigazzi |
| 4 | R2 | Oschersleben, Germany | Motorsport Arena Oschersleben | 4 June | | (Italy) Luca Persiani | (Italy) Ignazio Belluardo | (Italy) Corbetta Competizioni |
| 5 | R1 | Brno, Czech Republic | Masaryk Circuit | 2 September | (Russia) Vitaly Petrov | (Italy) Davide di Benedetto | (Italy) Davide di Benedetto | (Italy) Pro Motorsport |
| 5 | R2 | Brno, Czech Republic | Masaryk Circuit | 3 September | | (Russia) Vitaly Petrov | (Czech Republic) Jan Charouz | (Czech Republic) Charouz Racing System |
| 6 | R1 | Istanbul, Turkey | Istanbul Park | 23 September | (Czech Republic) Tomáš Kostka | (Italy) Massimo Torre | (Czech Republic) Tomáš Kostka | (Czech Republic) Charouz Racing System |
| 6 | R2 | Istanbul, Turkey | Istanbul Park | 24 September | | (Czech Republic) Tomáš Kostka | (Czech Republic) Jan Charouz | (Czech Republic) Charouz Racing System |
| 7 | R1 | Estoril, Portugal | Autódromo do Estoril | 21 October | (Italy) Giovanni Tedeschi | (Italy) Giovanni Tedeschi | (Brazil) Luiz Razia | (Czech Republic) Charouz Racing System |
| 7 | R2 | Estoril, Portugal | Autódromo do Estoril | 21 October | | (Brazil) Luiz Razia | (Brazil) Luiz Razia | (Czech Republic) Charouz Racing System |
| 7 | R3 | Estoril, Portugal | Autódromo do Estoril | 22 October | (Italy) Luca Persiani | (Brazil) Luiz Razia | (Brazil) Luiz Razia | (Czech Republic) Charouz Racing System |
| 7 | R4 | Estoril, Portugal | Autódromo do Estoril | 22 October | | Race cancelled due to rain | | |

== Championship Standings ==
=== Drivers ===
Points were awarded to the top eight classified finishers using the following structure:

| Position | 1st | 2nd | 3rd | 4th | 5th | 6th | 7th | 8th |
| Points | 10 | 8 | 6 | 5 | 4 | 3 | 2 | 1 |

| Pos | Driver | MNZ (Italy) | | MAG (France) | | BRH (United Kingdom) | | OSC (Germany) | | BRN (Czech Republic) | | IST (Turkey) | | EST (Portugal) | | | | Points |
|---|---|---|---|---|---|---|---|---|---|---|---|---|---|---|---|---|---|---|
| 1 | (Czech Republic) Jan Charouz | 2 | 3 | 7 | 9 | 3 | 2 | 5 | 4 | 2 | 1 | 7 | 1 | Ret | Ret | 3 | C | 75 |
| 2 | (Italy) Davide di Benedetto | 3 | 4 | 10 | 8 | 4 | 8 | 11 | 5 | 1 | 3 | Ret | 5 | 5 | 2 | 2 | C | 62 |
| 3 | (Czech Republic) Jaroslav Janiš | 1 | 1 | 1 | 2 | 1 | 3 | | | | | | | | | | | 54 |
| 4 | (Italy) Luca Persiani | Ret | 5 | 9 | 5 | 5 | 1 | 8 | 12 | 4 | 2 | Ret | 2 | 6 | 5 | 8 | C | 52 |
| 5 | (Italy) Ignazio Belluardo | 4 | 2 | 8 | 1 | Ret | 4 | 7 | 1 | 6 | 6 | Ret | Ret | | | | | 47 |
| 6 | (Italy) Giovanni Tedeschi | Ret | Ret | 5 | 4 | 8 | 5 | 9 | Ret | 7 | Ret | 3 | 3 | 2 | 9 | Ret | C | 36 |
| 7 | (Italy) Massimo Torre | 8 | 8 | Ret | 6 | Ret | Ret | 1 | 8 | Ret | 7 | 2 | Ret | Ret | 3 | Ret | C | 32 |
| 8 | (Brazil) Luiz Razia | | | | | | | | | | | | | 1 | 1 | 1 | C | 30 |
| 9 | (Italy) Marco Mocci | Ret | DNS | 6 | 3 | DNS | 6 | 6 | 3 | 8 | 4 | | | | | | | 27 |
| 10 | (Italy) Marcello Puglisi | | | | | 6 | Ret | | | 3 | 5 | Ret | 7 | 3 | Ret | Ret | C | 21 |
| 11 | (Spain) Emilio de Villota Jr. | Ret | Ret | 11 | 10 | 2 | 9 | 10 | 6 | 5 | 9 | | | 10 | 10 | 5 | C | 19 |
| 12 | (Czech Republic) Filip Salaquarda | | | | | | | 2 | 2 | | | | | | | | | 16 |
| 13 | (Thailand) Tor Graves | | | | | 7 | Ret | 14 | Ret | 10 | 13 | Ret | 4 | 4 | Ret | 6 | C | 15 |
| 14 | (Italy) Alessandro Pier Guidi | | | 3 | 7 | | | 4 | Ret | | | | | | | | | 13 |
| 15 | (France) Jean de Pourtales | | | | | Ret | 7 | | | 9 | 8 | 5 | Ret | 9 | 4 | Ret | C | 12 |
| 16 | (Czech Republic) Tomáš Kostka | | | | | | | | | | | 1 | 8 | | | | | 11 |
| 17 | (Russia) Daniil Move | Ret | DNS | 4 | Ret | Ret | Ret | 3 | 11 | | | | | | | | | 11 |
| 18 | (Italy) Michele Meredino | 7 | Ret | 12 | Ret | Ret | 11 | Ret | 9 | 12 | 11 | 4 | Ret | 7 | 8 | Ret | C | 10 |
| 19 | (Italy) Matteo Bobbi | | | 2 | Ret | | | | | | | | | | | | | 8 |
| 20 | (Germany) Dominik Schraml | | | | | | | | | | | | | Ret | 6 | 4 | C | 8 |
| 21 | (Italy) Fausto Ippoliti | 5 | 7 | | | | | | | | | | | | | | | 6 |
| 22 | (Germany) Timo Lienemann | 6 | 6 | | | | | | | | | | | | | | | 6 |
| 23 | (Italy) Kristian Ghedina | | | 13 | Ret | 10 | Ret | 12 | 7 | 11 | 10 | Ret | 6 | Ret | Ret | DNS | C | 5 |
| 24 | (Italy) Giovanni Faraonio | | | | | | | | | | | 6 | Ret | | | 7 | C | 5 |
| 25 | (Italy) Giandomenico Sposito | | | | | | | | | | | | | 8 | 7 | | | 3 |
| 26 | (Italy) Gian Maria Gabbiani | 9 | 9 | | | 9 | 10 | | | | | | | | | | | 0 |
| 27 | (Italy) Glauco Solieri | | | | | | | 13 | 10 | | | | | | | | | 0 |
| 28 | (Italy) Massimiliano Busnelli | Ret | 10 | | | | | | | | | | | | | | | 0 |
| 29 | (Russia) Vitaly Petrov | | | | | | | | | Ret | 12 | | | | | | | 0 |
| | (Italy) Gianni Giudici | Ret | DNS | | | | | | | | | | | | | | | 0 |
| Pos | Driver | MNZ (Italy) | | MAG (France) | | BRH (United Kingdom) | | OSC (Germany) | | BRN (Czech Republic) | | IST (Turkey) | | EST (Portugal) | | | | Points |

| Colour | Result |
|---|---|
| Gold | Winner |
| Silver | Second place |
| Bronze | Third place |
| Green | Points classification |
| Blue | Non-points classification |
| Blue | Non-classified finish (NC) |
| Purple | Retired, not classified (Ret) |
| Red | Did not qualify (DNQ) |
| Red | Did not pre-qualify (DNPQ) |
| Black | Disqualified (DSQ) |
| White | Did not start (DNS) |
| White | Withdrew (WD) |
| White | Race cancelled (C) |
| Blank | Did not practice (DNP) |
| Blank | Did not arrive (DNA) |
| Blank | Excluded (EX) |

=== Trofeo Momo ===
| Pos | Driver | MNZ (Italy) | | MAG (France) | | BRH (United Kingdom) | | OSC (Germany) | | BRN (Czech Republic) | | IST (Turkey) | | EST (Portugal) | | | | Points |
|---|---|---|---|---|---|---|---|---|---|---|---|---|---|---|---|---|---|---|
| 1 | (Czech Republic) Jan Charouz | 2 | 3 | 7 | 9 | 3 | 2 | 5 | 4 | 2 | 1 | 7 | 1 | Ret | Ret | 3 | C | 75 |
| 2 | (Italy) Ignazio Belluardo | 4 | 2 | 8 | 1 | Ret | 4 | 7 | 1 | 6 | 6 | Ret | Ret | | | | | 47 |
| 3 | (Italy) Giovanni Tedeschi | Ret | Ret | 5 | 4 | 8 | 5 | 9 | Ret | 7 | Ret | 3 | 3 | 2 | 9 | Ret | C | 36 |
| 4 | (Italy) Massimo Torre | 8 | 8 | Ret | 6 | Ret | Ret | 1 | 8 | Ret | 7 | 2 | Ret | Ret | 3 | Ret | C | 32 |
| 5 | (Russia) Daniil Move | Ret | DNS | 4 | Ret | Ret | Ret | 3 | 11 | | | | | | | | | 11 |
| Pos | Driver | MNZ (Italy) | | MAG (France) | | BRH (United Kingdom) | | OSC (Germany) | | BRN (Czech Republic) | | IST (Turkey) | | EST (Portugal) | | | | Points |

=== Teams ===
| Pos | Driver | MNZ (Italy) | | MAG (France) | | BRH (United Kingdom) | | OSC (Germany) | | BRN (Czech Republic) | | IST (Turkey) | | EST (Portugal) | | | | Points |
|---|---|---|---|---|---|---|---|---|---|---|---|---|---|---|---|---|---|---|
| 1 | (Czech Republic) Charouz Racing System | 1 | 1 | 1 | 2 | 1 | 3 | 2 | 2 | Ret | 12 | 1 | 8 | 1 | 1 | 1 | C | 186 |
| 1 | (Czech Republic) Charouz Racing System | 2 | 3 | 7 | 9 | 3 | 2 | 5 | 4 | 2 | 1 | 7 | 1 | Ret | Ret | 3 | C | 186 |
| 2 | (Italy) Pro Motorsport | 3 | 4 | 10 | 8 | 4 | 8 | 11 | 5 | 1 | 3 | Ret | 5 | 5 | 2 | 2 | C | 116 |
| 2 | (Italy) Pro Motorsport | Ret | Ret | 5 | 4 | 8 | 5 | 9 | Ret | 7 | Ret | 3 | 3 | 2 | 9 | Ret | C | 116 |
| 2 | (Italy) Pro Motorsport | Ret | 10 | | | | | | | 3 | 5 | Ret | 7 | 3 | Ret | Ret | C | 116 |
| 3 | (Italy) ADM Motorsport | Ret | DNS | 4 | Ret | Ret | Ret | 3 | 11 | | | | | Ret | 6 | 4 | C | 100 |
| 3 | (Italy) ADM Motorsport | 5 | 7 | 3 | 7 | 7 | Ret | 14 | Ret | 10 | 13 | Ret | 4 | 4 | Ret | 6 | C | 100 |
| 3 | (Italy) ADM Motorsport | Ret | 5 | 9 | 5 | 5 | 1 | 8 | 12 | 4 | 2 | Ret | 2 | 6 | 5 | 8 | C | 100 |
| 4 | (Italy) Scuderia Bigazzi | 9 | 9 | 13 | Ret | 10 | Ret | 12 | 7 | 11 | 10 | Ret | 6 | Ret | Ret | DNS | C | 37 |
| 4 | (Italy) Scuderia Bigazzi | 8 | 8 | Ret | 6 | Ret | Ret | 1 | 8 | Ret | 7 | 2 | Ret | Ret | 3 | Ret | C | 37 |
| 5 | (Italy) Alan Racing | Ret | DNS | 6 | 3 | DNS | 6 | 6 | 3 | 8 | 4 | | | | | | | 32 |
| 5 | (Italy) Alan Racing | 7 | Ret | | | 6 | Ret | | | | | | | | | | | 32 |
| 6 | (Italy) Scuderia Famà | | | | | | | | | | | 6 | Ret | 8 | 7 | 7 | C | 28 |
| 6 | (Italy) Scuderia Famà | | | | | Ret | 11 | Ret | 9 | 12 | 11 | 4 | Ret | 7 | 8 | Ret | C | 28 |
| 6 | (Italy) Scuderia Famà | | | | | Ret | 7 | 13 | 10 | 9 | 8 | 5 | Ret | 9 | 4 | Ret | C | 28 |
| 7 | (Italy) Scuderia Giudici | Ret | DNS | 12 | Ret | | | | | | | | | | | | | 24 |
| 7 | (Italy) Scuderia Giudici | Ret | Ret | 11 | 10 | | | | | | | | | | | | | 24 |
| 7 | (Italy) Scuderia Giudici | 4 | 2 | 8 | 1 | | | | | | | | | | | | | 24 |
| 8 | (Italy) Corbetta Competizioni | 6 | 6 | | | 9 | 10 | | | | | | | | | | | 23 |
| 8 | (Italy) Corbetta Competizioni | | | | | Ret | 4 | 7 | 1 | | | | | | | | | 23 |
| 9 | (Italy) Pro Motorsport by Fortuna | | | | | 2 | 9 | 10 | 6 | 5 | 9 | | | 10 | 10 | 5 | C | 19 |
| 10 | (Italy) Fortuna | | | 2 | Ret | | | | | 6 | 6 | Ret | Ret | | | | | 14 |
| 11 | (Italy) ADM Junior Team | | | | | | | 4 | Ret | | | | | | | | | 5 |
| Pos | Driver | MNZ (Italy) | | MAG (France) | | BRH (United Kingdom) | | OSC (Germany) | | BRN (Czech Republic) | | IST (Turkey) | | EST (Portugal) | | | | Points |

| Colour | Result |
|---|---|
| Gold | Winner |
| Silver | Second place |
| Bronze | Third place |
| Green | Points classification |
| Blue | Non-points classification |
| Blue | Non-classified finish (NC) |
| Purple | Retired, not classified (Ret) |
| Red | Did not qualify (DNQ) |
| Red | Did not pre-qualify (DNPQ) |
| Black | Disqualified (DSQ) |
| White | Did not start (DNS) |
| White | Withdrew (WD) |
| White | Race cancelled (C) |
| Blank | Did not practice (DNP) |
| Blank | Did not arrive (DNA) |
| Blank | Excluded (EX) |
