= Tor Graves =

Thai racing driver

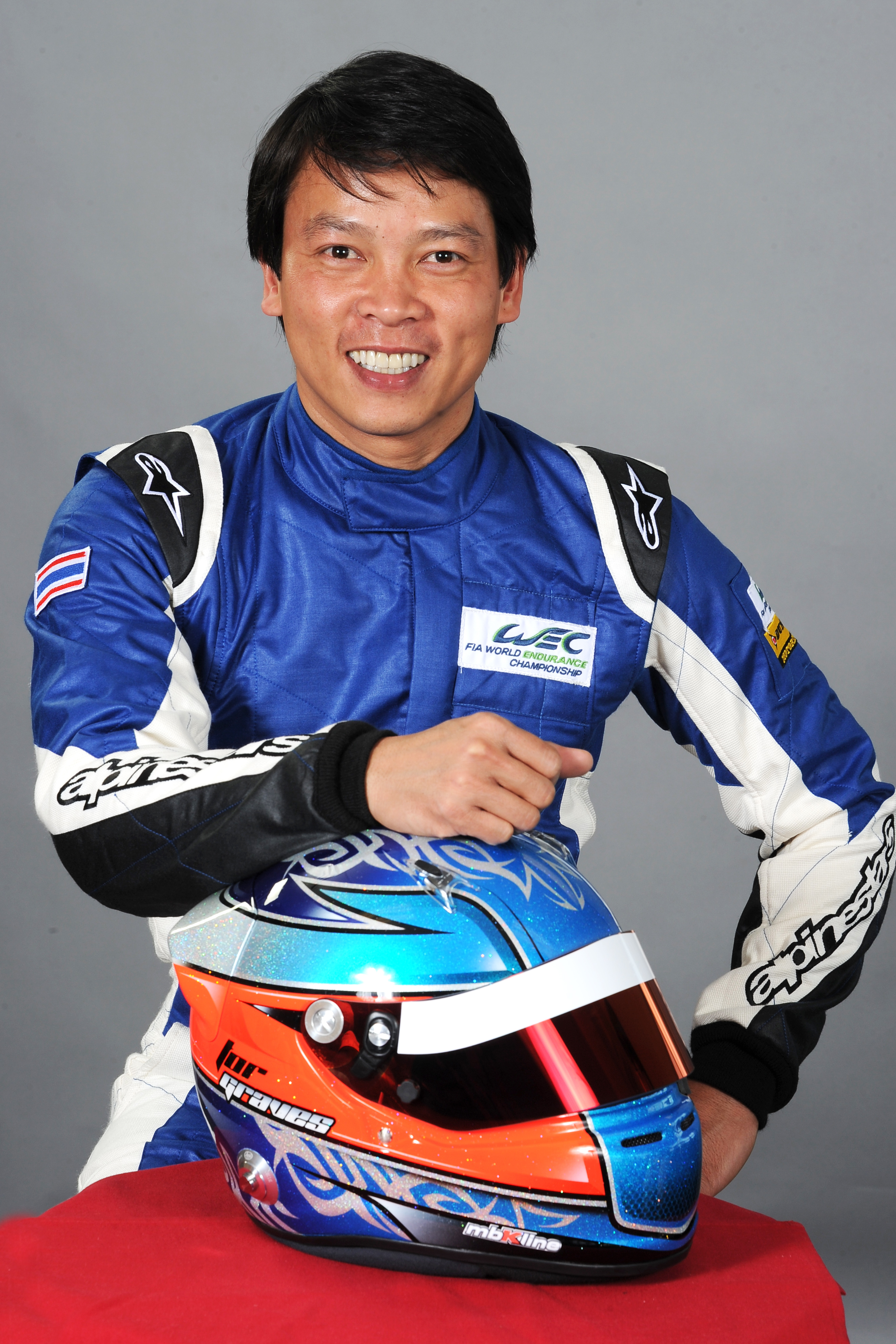
- Tor Graves in 2012
- Nationality: (Thailand) Thai
- Born: Torsak Sriachavanon; March 26, 1972 (age 54) Nakhon Pathom, Thailand

FIA World Endurance Championship career
- Debut season: 2012
- Current team: ADR-Delta
- Categorisation: FIA Silver
- Car number: 25
- Starts: 160
- Wins: 3
- Podiums: 11

Previous series
- 2010–11 2009–11 2007–08 2006 2005 2004 1999–03 1995–98 1993–94: Intercontinental Le Mans; Formula Le Mans; International Formula Master; F3000 International Masters; 3000 Pro Series; Euro Formula 3000; British Formula 3 Formula Renault UK; British Formula First

Torsak Sriachavanon (born March 26, 1972), professionally known as Tor Graves, is a Thai racing driver who most recently competed in the FIA World Endurance Championship for CEFC Manor TRS Racing.

== Racing record ==
=== Career summary ===
| Season | Series | Team | Races | Wins | Poles | Fast laps | Points | Pos. |
|---|---|---|---|---|---|---|---|---|
| 1993 | British Formula First Championship | | ? | ? | ? | ? | ? | ? |
| 1994 | British Formula First Championship | | ? | ? | ? | ? | ? | 6th |
| 1995 | British Formula Renault Championship | | ? | ? | ? | ? | 27 | 10th |
| 1996 | British Formula Renault Championship | | ? | ? | ? | ? | ? | 14th |
| 1997 | British Formula Renault Championship | Fortec Motorsport | 13 | 0 | 0 | 0 | 50 | 10th |
| 1998 | British Formula Renault Championship | Manor Motorsport | ? | ? | ? | ? | 140 | 8th |
| 1999 | British Formula Three Championship | Manor Motorsport | 16 | 0 | 0 | 0 | 17 | 14th |
| 2000 | British Formula Three Championship | Alan Docking Racing | 10 | 0 | 0 | 0 | 2 | 17th |
| 2002 | British Formula Three Championship | Alan Docking Racing | 26 | 0 | 0 | 0 | 2 | 25th |
| 2003 | British Formula Three Championship | Manor Motorsport | 25 | 0 | 0 | 0 | 0 | 30th |
| 2003 | Masters of Formula 3 | Manor Motorsport | 1 | 0 | 0 | 0 | N/A | 21st |
| 2004 | Euro Formula 3000 | GP Racing | 10 | 0 | 0 | 0 | 0 | 16th |
| 2005 | 3000 Pro Series | Team JVA | 8 | 0 | 0 | 0 | 23 | 5th |
| 2006 | F3000 International Masters | ADM Motorsport | 11 | 0 | 0 | 0 | 15 | 13th |
| 2006 | Le Mans Series - LMGT2 | T2M Motorsport | 1 | 0 | 0 | 0 | ? | ? |
| 2007 | International Formula Master | Team JVA | 12 | 0 | 0 | 0 | 1 | 30th |
| 2008 | International Formula Master | Team JVA | 16 | 0 | 0 | 0 | 0 | 28th |
| 2011 | Le Mans Series - FLM | Hope Polevision Racing | 1 | 0 | 0 | 0 | 23 | 8th |
| 2011 | Le Mans Series - FLM | Neil Garner Motorsport | 1 | 0 | 0 | 0 | 23 | 8th |
| 2012 | FIA World Endurance Championship - LMP2 | ADR-Delta | 8 | 3 | 0 | 0 | 26 | 17th |
| 2012 | 24 Hours of Le Mans - LMP2 | ADR-Delta | 1 | 0 | 0 | 0 | N/A | 6th |
| 2013 | FIA World Endurance Championship - LMP2 | Delta-ADR | 7 | 1 | 1 | 0 | 56 | 5th |
| 2013 | 24 Hours of Le Mans - LMP2 | Delta-ADR | 1 | 0 | 0 | 0 | N/A | DNF |
| 2015 | United SportsCar Championship - Prototype | Starworks Motorsport | 1 | 0 | 0 | 0 | 23 | 30th |
| 2016 | FIA World Endurance Championship - LMP2 | Manor | 6 | 0 | 0 | 0 | 14.5 | 25th |
| 2016 | 24 Hours of Le Mans - LMP2 | Manor | 1 | 0 | 0 | 0 | N/A | DNF |
| 2017 | FIA World Endurance Championship - LMP2 | CEFC Manor TRS Racing | 4 | 0 | 0 | 0 | 40 | 19th |
| 2017 | 24 Hours of Le Mans - LMP2 | CEFC Manor TRS Racing | 1 | 0 | 0 | 0 | N/A | 6th |

=== 24 Hours of Le Mans results ===
| Year | Team | Co-Drivers | Car | Class | Laps | Pos. | Class Pos. |
|---|---|---|---|---|---|---|---|
| 2012 | (United Kingdom) ADR-Delta | (Australia) John Martin (Czech Republic) Jan Charouz | Oreca 03-Nissan | LMP2 | 346 | 13th | 6th |
| 2013 | (United Kingdom) Delta-ADR | (United Kingdom) Archie Hamilton (Japan) Shinji Nakano | Oreca 03-Nissan | LMP2 | 101 | DNF | DNF |
| 2016 | (United Kingdom) Manor | (Spain) Roberto Merhi (United Kingdom) Matt Rao | Oreca 05-Nissan | LMP2 | 283 | DNF | DNF |
| 2017 | (China) CEFC Manor TRS Racing | (Switzerland) Jonathan Hirschi (France) Jean-Éric Vergne | Oreca 07-Gibson | LMP2 | 360 | 7th | 6th |

=== Complete WeatherTech SportsCar Championship results ===
(key) (Races in bold indicate pole position; results in italics indicate fastest lap)

| Year | Team | Class | Make | Engine | 1 | 2 | 3 | 4 | 5 | 6 | 7 | 8 | 9 | 10 | Rank | Points |
|---|---|---|---|---|---|---|---|---|---|---|---|---|---|---|---|---|
| 2015 | Starworks Motorsport | P | Riley Mk XXVI DP | Dinan (BMW) 5.0 L V8 | DAY; 9 | SEB | LBH | LGA | DET | WGL | MOS | ELK | COA | PET | 30th | 23 |
