= 2007 International Formula Master =

Seasons
- ← 2006 2008 →

The 2007 International Formula Master was the inaugural International Formula Master series season. The season started on the weekend of May 18–20 at Valencia, and served as a support series to the World Touring Car Championship in all the latter's European races except Zandvoort, Netherlands.

Belgian driver Jérôme d'Ambrosio was the season champion, driving car number 25 for Cram Competition.

The scoring system awarded 10-8-6-5-4-3-2-1 points to the top eight finishers, with all results counting towards the final score.

== Teams and drivers ==
Entrant	No	Driver	Rounds
(Switzerland) Jenzer Motorsport	2	(Switzerland) Rahel Frey	All
(Switzerland) Jenzer Motorsport	3	(Finland) Juho Annala	All
(Switzerland) Iris Project	4	(Spain) Oliver Campos-Hull	All
(Switzerland) Iris Project	5	(Switzerland) Nicolas Maulini	1-3, 5-8
(Italy) JD Motorsport	6	(Brazil) Claudio Cantelli	All
(Italy) JD Motorsport	7	(New Zealand) Chris van der Drift	All
(Italy) JD Motorsport	8	(Denmark) Kasper Andersen	All
(Italy) Pro Motorsport	9	(Italy) Marcello Puglisi	All
(Italy) Pro Motorsport	10	(Italy) Mattia Pavoni	1, 3-4, 6-8
(Italy) Pro Motorsport	11	(Italy) Ignazio Belluardo	1-5
(Italy) Pro Motorsport	15	(Italy) Salvatore Gatto	6-8
(Italy) Pro Motorsport	40	(Italy) Luigi Ferrara	2-3
(Italy) Alan Racing	12	(Mexico) Pablo Sánchez López	All
(Italy) Alan Racing	14	(Italy) Giuseppe Terranova	All
(Italy) Alan Racing	15	(Italy) Salvatore Gatto	1-5
(Italy) Alan Racing	43	(Russia) Daniil Move	6,8
(Czech Republic) ISR Racing	16	(Germany) Maximilian Götz	1-3
(Czech Republic) ISR Racing	33	(Netherlands) Nick de Bruijn	4-8
(Czech Republic) ISR Racing	36	(Czech Republic) Erik Janiš	4-5
(Czech Republic) ISR Racing	44	(Czech Republic) Filip Salaquarda	8
(Italy) Euronova Racing	18	(Italy) Alberto Costa	All
(Italy) Euronova Racing	19	(France) Pierre Ragues	All
(Italy) Euronova Racing	20	(Russia) Vitaly Petrov	1
(Italy) Euronova Racing	23	(Finland) Sami Isohella	7-8
(Italy) Euronova Racing	42	(Italy) Marco Bonanomi	4-6
(Italy) Euronova Racing	45	(United Kingdom) Michael Meadows	7
(Italy) ADM Motorsport	21	(Italy) Frankie Provenzano	1-3, 5-8
(Italy) ADM Motorsport	22	(Italy) Michele Caliendo	All
(Italy) ADM Motorsport	33	(Netherlands) Nick de Bruijn	1-3
(Italy) ADM Motorsport	34	(Germany) Dominik Schraml	1-3
(Italy) ADM Motorsport	41	(Austria) Norbert Siedler	4-8
(Finland) Team Soderman	23	(Finland) Sami Isohella	1-3, 5
(Italy) Cram Competition	24	(Spain) Arturo Llobell	All
(Italy) Cram Competition	25	(Belgium) Jérôme d'Ambrosio	All
(Italy) Cram Competition	26	(Macau) Rodolfo Ávila	All
(United Kingdom) Team JVA	27	(Thailand) Tor Graves	1-6
(United Kingdom) Team JVA	28	(United Kingdom) Jon Barnes	1
(Italy) Ombra Racing	29	(Venezuela) Johnny Cecotto Jr.	All
(Italy) Ombra Racing	30	(Netherlands) Dominick Muermans	All
(Italy) Scuderia Famà	31	(Italy) Luca Persiani	All
(Italy) Scuderia Famà	32	(Italy) Massimo Torre	All
(Italy) Bicar Racing	35	(Italy) Marco Mapelli	8

== Race calendar ==
Round		Location	Circuit	Date	Pole position	Fastest lap	Winning driver	Winning team
1	R1	Valencia, Spain	Circuit de Valencia	19 March	(Germany) Maximilian Götz	(Germany) Maximilian Götz	(Italy) Salvatore Gatto	(Italy) Alan Racing
1	R2	Valencia, Spain	Circuit de Valencia	20 March		(Germany) Maximilian Götz	(Denmark) Kasper Andersen	(Italy) JD Motorsport
2	R1	Pau, France	Pau Circuit	2 June	(Germany) Maximilian Götz	(Germany) Maximilian Götz	(New Zealand) Chris van der Drift	(Italy) JD Motorsport
2	R2	Pau, France	Pau Circuit	3 June		(Belgium) Jérôme d'Ambrosio	(Mexico) Pablo Sánchez López	(Italy) Alan Racing
3	R1	Brno, Czech Republic	Masaryk Circuit	16 June	(Germany) Maximilian Götz	(Belgium) Jérôme d'Ambrosio	(Belgium) Jérôme d'Ambrosio	(Italy) Cram Competition
3	R2	Brno, Czech Republic	Masaryk Circuit	17 June		(New Zealand) Chris van der Drift	(Belgium) Jérôme d'Ambrosio	(Italy) Cram Competition
4	R1	Porto, Portugal	Circuito da Boavista	7 July	(Mexico) Pablo Sánchez López	(Austria) Norbert Siedler	(Mexico) Pablo Sánchez López	(Italy) Alan Racing
4	R2	Porto, Portugal	Circuito da Boavista	8 July		(New Zealand) Chris van der Drift	(Austria) Norbert Siedler	(Italy) ADM Motorsport
5	R1	Anderstorp, Sweden	Scandinavian Raceway	28 July	(Italy) Marco Bonanomi	(Denmark) Kasper Andersen	(Denmark) Kasper Andersen	(Italy) JD Motorsport
5	R2	Anderstorp, Sweden	Scandinavian Raceway	29 July		(Austria) Norbert Siedler	(Austria) Norbert Siedler	(Italy) ADM Motorsport
6	R1	Oschersleben, Germany	Motorsport Arena Oschersleben	25 August	(New Zealand) Chris van der Drift	(Belgium) Jérôme d'Ambrosio	(Belgium) Jérôme d'Ambrosio	(Italy) Cram Competition
6	R2	Oschersleben, Germany	Motorsport Arena Oschersleben	26 August		(Denmark) Kasper Andersen	(New Zealand) Chris van der Drift	(Italy) JD Motorsport
7	R1	(United Kingdom) Kent, UK	Brands Hatch	22 September	(Belgium) Jérôme d'Ambrosio	(Belgium) Jérôme d'Ambrosio	(Belgium) Jérôme d'Ambrosio	(Italy) Cram Competition
7	R2	(United Kingdom) Kent, UK	Brands Hatch	23 September		(Belgium) Jérôme d'Ambrosio	(Spain) Arturo Llobell	(Italy) Cram Competition
8	R1	Monza, Italy	Autodromo Nazionale Monza	6 October	(Russia) Daniil Move	(Belgium) Jérôme d'Ambrosio	(Belgium) Jérôme d'Ambrosio	(Italy) Cram Competition
8	R2	Monza, Italy	Autodromo Nazionale Monza	7 October		(Belgium) Jérôme d'Ambrosio	(Italy) Marcello Puglisi	(Italy) Pro Motorsport

== Championship Standings ==
=== Drivers ===
Pos	Driver	VAL (Spain)		PAU (France)		BRN (Czech Republic)		BOA (Portugal)		AND (Sweden)		OSC (Germany)		BRH (United Kingdom)		MNZ (Italy)		Pts
1	(Belgium) Jérôme d'Ambrosio	6	2	3	3	1	1	3	Ret	2	16	1	8	1	5	1	2	100
2	(New Zealand) Chris van der Drift	Ret	10	1	Ret	3	3	Ret	6	Ret	Ret	2	1	4	3	4	3	65
3	(Mexico) Pablo Sánchez López	9	6	8	1	6	4	1	DNS	3	8	Ret	9	6	Ret	2	11	50
4	(Italy) Salvatore Gatto	1	11	5	4	8	5	5	2	10	Ret	9	7	2	Ret	13	5	50
5	(Italy) Marcello Puglisi	14	8	Ret	13	20	8	2	3	16	5	4	2	9	Ret	5	1	47
6	(Austria) Norbert Siedler							6	1	Ret	1	3	Ret	3	4	16	Ret	40
7	(Denmark) Kasper Andersen	5	1	Ret	Ret	10	6	8	Ret	1	14	12	5	Ret	8	15	Ret	33
8	(Venezuela) Johnny Cecotto Jr.	3	5	10	10	9	18	4	Ret	Ret	3	13	10	8	2	Ret	9	30
9	(Spain) Arturo Llobell	2	18	Ret	Ret	14	22	13	8	Ret	9	6	Ret	7	1	10	13	24
10	(Germany) Maximilian Götz	10	4	2	6	2	Ret											24
11	(Finland) Juho Annala	7	14	4	2	13	9	15	11	12	4	Ret	12	19	Ret	14	Ret	20
12	(Italy) Luca Persiani	11	7	Ret	DNS	15	14	10	7	6	Ret	5	6	Ret	Ret	3	Ret	20
13	(Spain) Oliver Campos-Hull	4	3	11	Ret	11	10	17	16	13	2	17	Ret	14	Ret	11	12	19
14	(France) Pierre Ragues	19	9	12	5	18	17	Ret	15	5	Ret	7	3	10	DNS	22	15	16
15	(Italy) Marco Bonanomi							12	4	22	Ret	8	4					11
16	(Italy) Giuseppe Terranova	15	Ret	17	15	7	2	18	14	Ret	11	Ret	Ret	Ret	Ret	Ret	Ret	10
17	(Switzerland) Rahel Frey	12	Ret	7	Ret	5	Ret	9	Ret	7	Ret	10	20	13	Ret	8	Ret	9
18	(Russia) Daniil Move											22	13			6	4	8
19	(Macau) Rodolfo Ávila	18	17	Ret	Ret	23	12	Ret	Ret	4	6	16	Ret	20	Ret	23	14	8
20	(Italy) Frankie Provenzano	Ret	25	Ret	14	DNS	DNS			14	Ret	15	11	5	6	19	Ret	7
21	(Netherlands) Nick de Bruijn	24	Ret	6	12	21	Ret	16	5	Ret	12	11	19	Ret	Ret	Ret	Ret	7
22	(Italy) Massimo Torre	23	13	13	7	16	Ret	Ret	13	17	Ret	Ret	Ret	Ret	13	7	6	7
23	(Italy) Alberto Costa	8	20	9	Ret	4	Ret	DNS	DNS	20	13	14	14	Ret	14	9	Ret	6
24	(Italy) Ignazio Belluardo	13	Ret	14	Ret	12	7	Ret	17	18	7							4
25	(Czech Republic) Erik Janiš							7	Ret	Ret	10							2
26	(Italy) Mattia Pavoni	20	16			26	Ret	Ret	Ret			20	Ret	18	11	20	7	2
27	(Finland) Samy Isohella	Ret	19	Ret	11					19	Ret			11	7	Ret	Ret	2
28	(Netherlands) Dominick Muermans	22	Ret	Ret	Ret	Ret	20	19	10	9	Ret	Ret	16	15	Ret	18	8	1
29	(Brazil) Claudio Cantelli	27	15	16	8	24	13	11	9	11	Ret	19	15	16	12	21	10	1
30	(Thailand) Tor Graves	21	22	Ret	Ret	25	19	Ret	12	8	Ret	Ret	17					1
31	(Italy) Michele Caliendo	25	23	Ret	DNS	Ret	16	14	Ret	21	15	18	Ret	12	9	17	Ret	0
32	(Germany) Dominik Schraml	26	24	15	9	Ret	Ret											0
33	(Switzerland) Nicolas Maulini	17	12	Ret	Ret	22	15			15	Ret	21	18	17	10	Ret	Ret	0
34	(Italy) Marco Mapelli															12	Ret	0
35	(Russia) Vitaly Petrov	16	Ret															0
36	(Czech Republic) Filip Salaquarda															Ret	16	0
37	(Italy) Luigi Ferrara			Ret	Ret	17	21											0
38	(United Kingdom) Jon Barnes	Ret	21															0
	(United Kingdom) Michael Meadows													Ret	Ret			0
Pos	Driver	VAL (Spain)		PAU (France)		BRN (Czech Republic)		BOA (Portugal)		AND (Sweden)		OSC (Germany)		BRH (United Kingdom)		MNZ (Italy)		Pts

Colour	Result
Gold	Winner
Silver	Second place
Bronze	Third place
Green	Points classification
Blue	Non-points classification
Blue	Non-classified finish (NC)
Purple	Retired, not classified (Ret)
Red	Did not qualify (DNQ)
Red	Did not pre-qualify (DNPQ)
Black	Disqualified (DSQ)
White	Did not start (DNS)
White	Withdrew (WD)
White	Race cancelled (C)
Blank	Did not practice (DNP)
Blank	Did not arrive (DNA)
Blank	Excluded (EX)

==== Teams ====
Pos	Driver	VAL (Spain)		PAU (France)		BRN (Czech Republic)		BOA (Portugal)		AND (Sweden)		OSC (Germany)		BRH (United Kingdom)		MNZ (Italy)		Pts
1	(Italy) Cram Competition	2	18	Ret	Ret	14	22	13	8	Ret	9	6	Ret	7	1	10	13	132
1	(Italy) Cram Competition	6	2	3	3	1	1	3	Ret	2	16	1	8	1	5	1	2	132
2	(Italy) Alan Racing	9	6	8	1	6	4	1	DNS	3	8	Ret	9	6	Ret	2	11	104
2	(Italy) Alan Racing	1	11	5	4	8	5	5	2	10	Ret	22	13	Ret	Ret	6	4	104
3	(Italy) JD Motorsport	Ret	10	1	Ret	3	3	Ret	6	Ret	Ret	2	1	4	3	4	3	99
3	(Italy) JD Motorsport	5	1	Ret	Ret	10	6	8	Ret	1	14	12	5	Ret	8	15	Ret	99
4	(Italy) Pro Motorsport	14	8	Ret	13	20	8	2	3	16	5	4	2	9	Ret	5	1	67
4	(Italy) Pro Motorsport	13	Ret	14	Ret	12	7	Ret	17	18	7	9	7	2	Ret	13	5	67
5	(Italy) ADM Motorsport	Ret	25	Ret	14	DNS	DNS	6	1	Ret	1	3	Ret	3	4	16	Ret	50
5	(Italy) ADM Motorsport	25	23	Ret	DNS	Ret	16	14	Ret	14	Ret	15	11	5	6	19	Ret	50
6	(Italy) Euronova Racing	8	20	9	Ret	4	Ret	DNS	DNS	20	13	14	14	Ret	14	9	Ret	35
6	(Italy) Euronova Racing	19	9	12	5	18	17	Ret	15	5	Ret	7	3	10	DNS	22	15	35
7	(Italy) Ombra Racing	3	5	10	10	9	18	4	Ret	Ret	3	13	10	8	2	Ret	9	31
7	(Italy) Ombra Racing	22	Ret	Ret	Ret	Ret	20	19	10	9	Ret	Ret	16	15	Ret	18	8	31
8	(Czech Republic) ISR Racing	10	4	2	6	2	Ret	16	5	Ret	12	11	19	Ret	Ret	Ret	Ret	30
8	(Czech Republic) ISR Racing							7	Ret	Ret	10					Ret	16	30
9	(Switzerland) Jenzer Motorsport	12	Ret	7	Ret	5	Ret	9	Ret	7	Ret	10	20	13	Ret	8	Ret	29
9	(Switzerland) Jenzer Motorsport	7	14	4	2	13	9	15	11	12	4	Ret	12	19	Ret	14	Ret	29
10	(Italy) Scuderia Famà	11	7	Ret	DNS	15	14	10	7	6	Ret	5	6	Ret	Ret	3	Ret	27
10	(Italy) Scuderia Famà	23	13	13	7	16	Ret	Ret	13	17	Ret	Ret	Ret	Ret	13	7	6	27
11	(Switzerland) Iris Project	4	3	11	Ret	11	10	17	16	13	2	17	Ret	14	Ret	11	12	19
11	(Switzerland) Iris Project	17	12	Ret	Ret	22	15			15	Ret	21	18	17	10	Ret	Ret	19
12	(United Kingdom) Team JVA	21	22	Ret	Ret	25	19	Ret	12	8	Ret	Ret	17					1
12	(United Kingdom) Team JVA	Ret	21															1
13	(Finland) Team Soderman	Ret	19	Ret	11	19	11			19	Ret							0
14	(Italy) Bicar Racing															12	Ret	0
Pos	Driver	VAL (Spain)		PAU (France)		BRN (Czech Republic)		BOA (Portugal)		AND (Sweden)		OSC (Germany)		BRH (United Kingdom)		MNZ (Italy)		Pts

Colour	Result
Gold	Winner
Silver	Second place
Bronze	Third place
Green	Points classification
Blue	Non-points classification
Blue	Non-classified finish (NC)
Purple	Retired, not classified (Ret)
Red	Did not qualify (DNQ)
Red	Did not pre-qualify (DNPQ)
Black	Disqualified (DSQ)
White	Did not start (DNS)
White	Withdrew (WD)
White	Race cancelled (C)
Blank	Did not practice (DNP)
Blank	Did not arrive (DNA)
Blank	Excluded (EX)
