= Daniil Move =

Russian race car driver (born 1985)

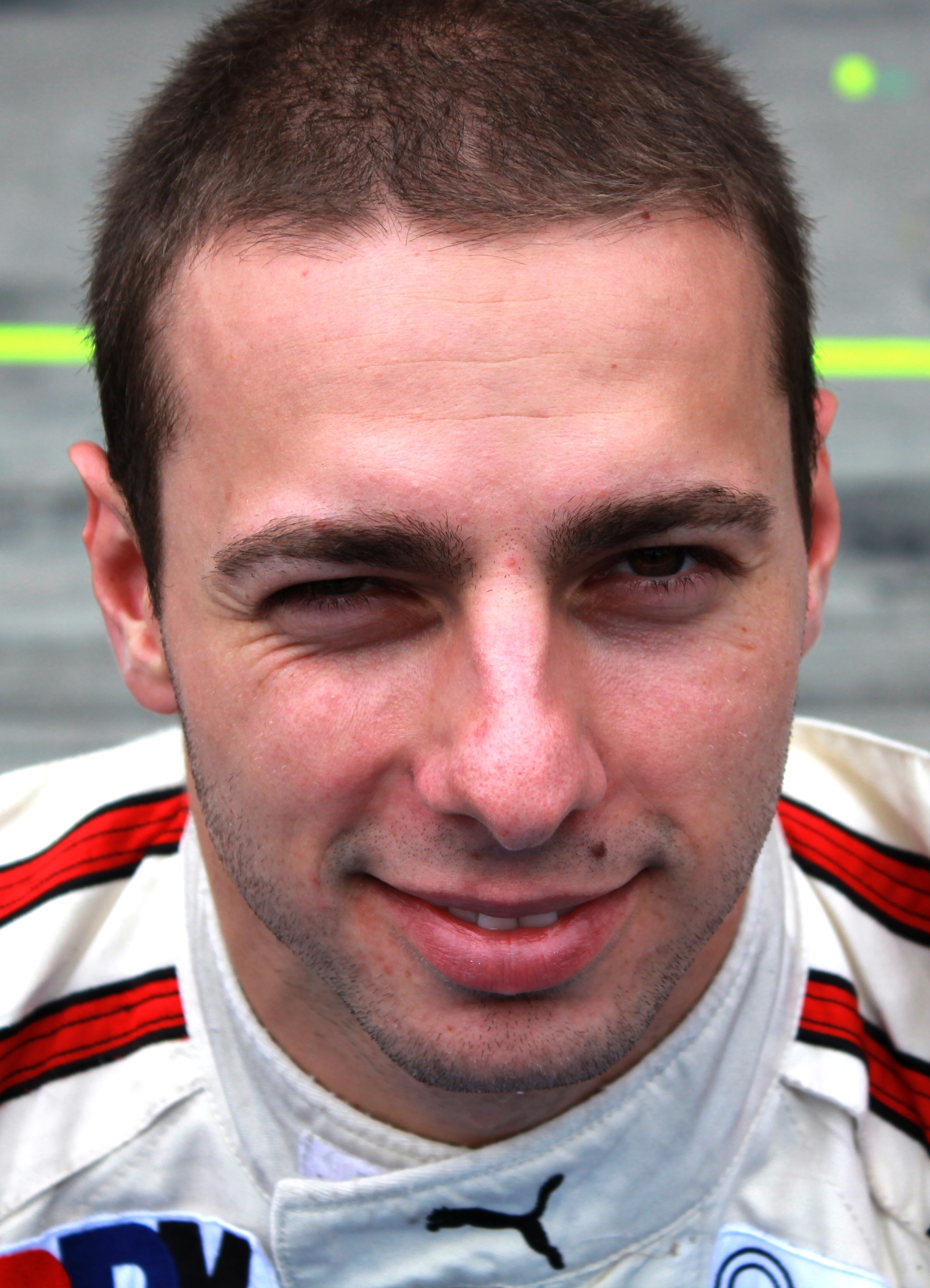
- Move in 2012
- Nationality: (Russia) Russian
- Born: Daniil Yuryevich Move; 11 December 1985 (age 40) Moscow, Russia
- Relatives: Sergey Zlobin (brother)

Formula Renault 3.5 Series career
- Debut season: 2007
- Current team: SMP Racing by Comtec
- Categorisation: FIA Silver (until 2019); FIA Bronze (2025–)
- Car number: 15
- Former teams: P1 Motorsport; Interwetten.com; Junior Lotus Racing; KTR
- Starts: 108
- Wins: 0
- Poles: 1
- Fastest laps: 0
- Best finish: 10th in 2009, 2011

Previous series
- 2007; 2006; 2005; 2005; 2004: International Formula Master; F3000 International Masters; 3000 Pro Series; Formula 1600 Russia; Formula RUS

Daniil Yuryevich Move (born 11 December 1985) is a Russian racing driver.

== Education ==
Move attended Moscow School No. 11 with an emphasis on the study of the Chinese language. He graduated from high school with honors through external studies. In 2008, he also graduated with honors from the Moscow Institute of Economics, Management, and Law.

Move began practicing sports at a young age. He spent six years playing professional football and practicing karate, among other sports. However, his interest shifted when he first tried professional karting in his youth. Since then, Move has earned money working as a mechanic for teams, investing all his earnings into amateur competitions to gain the chance to participate in professional races.

== Career ==
In 2003, as a prize for winning the amateur karting championship in Moscow, Move participated in two races of the English Formula Ford Championship, securing 3rd and 1st places.

In the 2004 season, Move received financial support from the Russian law firm "Berg&Green," following test results (a prize for winning amateur competitions). From the first season, he became the vice-champion and the best newcomer (winner in the "Junior" category) in the Russian "Formula Russ" championship (eight races, two wins, six podiums, two pole positions). In 2005, he was a test pilot for the first-ever Russian carbon-fiber formula chassis "ArtTech." Despite several accidents, he remained uninjured. Move also participated in two races in the "Formula Russ" championship, taking first place in all practices, qualifications, and both races.

In 2006, Move competed in several races of the F3000 International Masters championship, securing third place at the Oschersleben circuit (Germany) and fourth place at the Magny-Cours circuit (France).

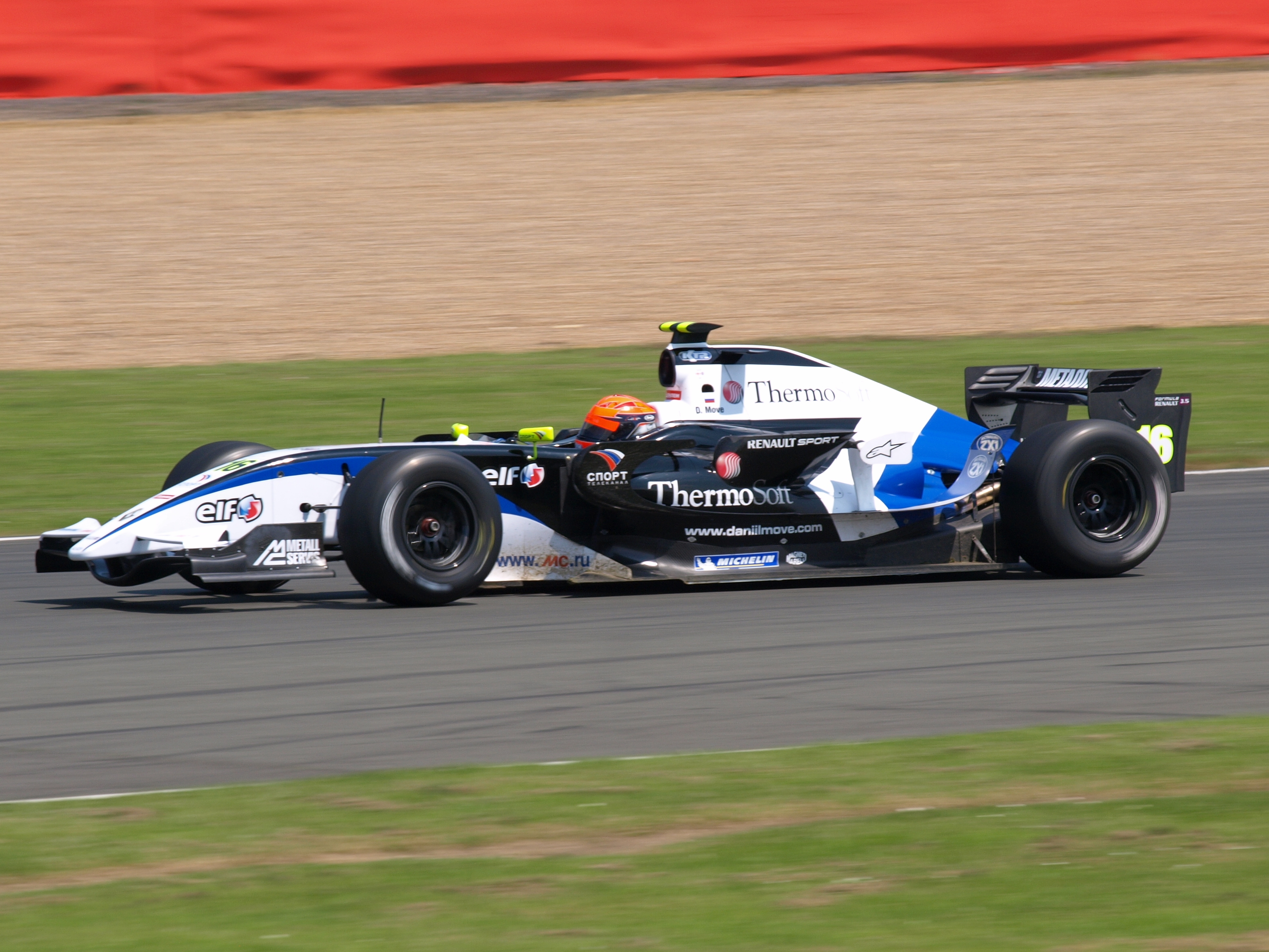
Move at the 2008 World Series by Renault Silverstone round.

During the same season, Move participated in one race in the "Formula Russ" class, which he won. After tests in the "Renault World Series" championship, he signed a contract to participate in the 2007 championship with the Austrian team "Interwetten." Later, in 2008, he also competed for the Belgian team KTR. At the end of the 2007 season, he participated in a test session of the "Formula Masters" (showing the best result) and in two races of this championship. In the first race, he retired after a serious accident, while in Monza (Italy), he secured pole position and finished fourth after engine problems.

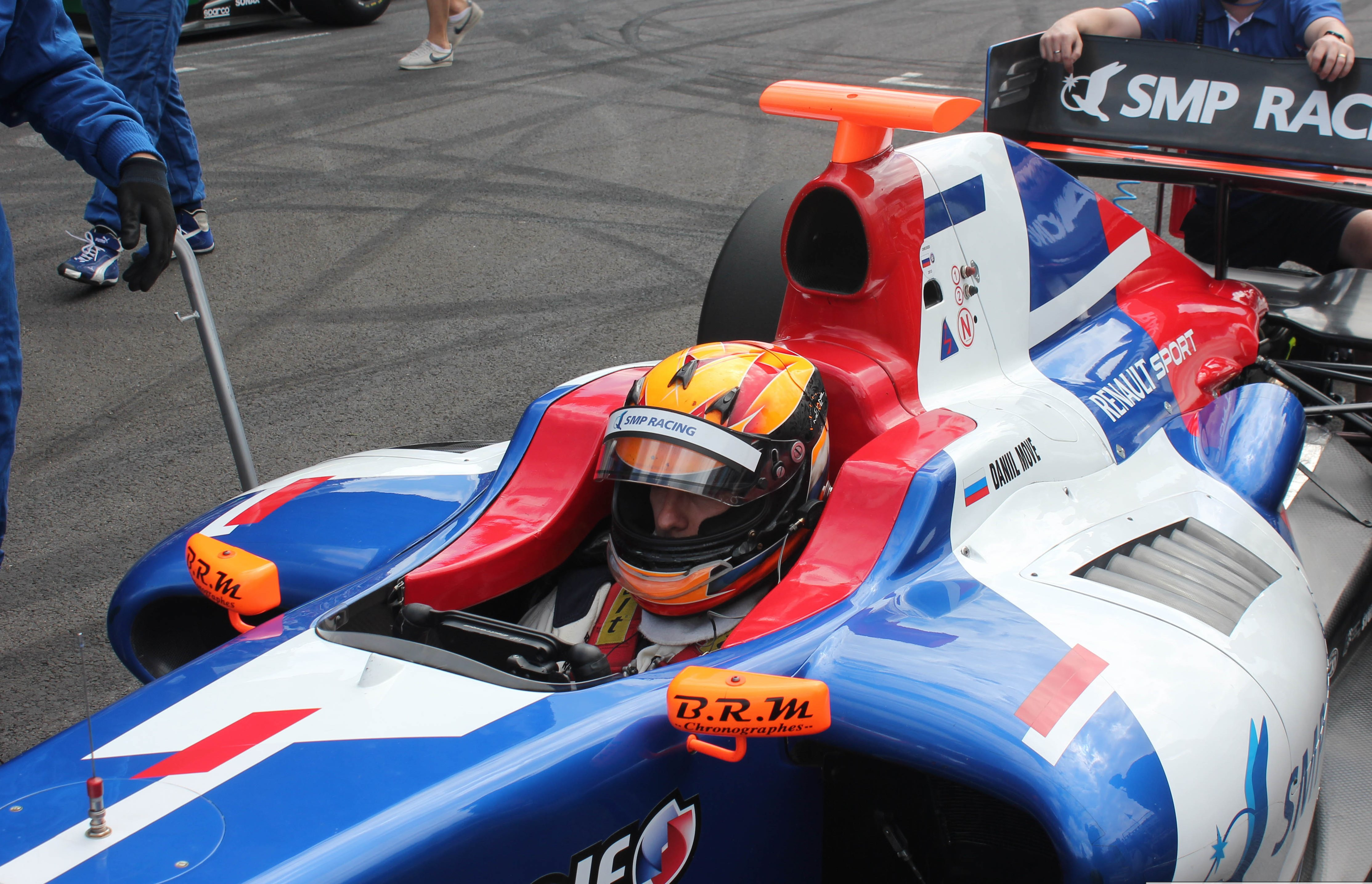
Move in his SMP Racing-branded FR3.5 car at Moscow in 2013.

From 2009 to 2013, Move continued to compete in the "World Series," demonstrating strong performances in tests and races. He frequently reached the podium and earned points. In the 2009 and 2011 seasons, he finished in the top-ten overall. During this period, he was part of the youth programs of Formula 1 teams "Marusia" and "Lotus."

In the 2013 season, consistently showing high speed, Move participated in several races of the "Blancpain GT Series" in a Ferrari car as part of a Russian team.

In 2008, Move set nine records in Formula Medicine testing and was recognized as physically and mentally the best prepared race driver in the world.

Twice, Move entered the top-ten of the World Series Renault (Formula 2).

== Television Programs, Media ==
Throughout his professional career from 2006 to 2014, Move was a TV presenter, co-host, and journalist in the media on channels such as "Eurosport," "Russia-2," "AUTO+," and "Ren-TV."

From 2007 to 2014, Move was a co-author of articles for magazines such as "Za Rulem," "Avtorevyu," "Klakson," and also hosted segments on radio stations "Echo" and "Mayak."

In 2012, Move served as a judge on the international reality show "Academy NISSAN GT," which was broadcast in the USA, UK, Russia, and European countries.

== Charity ==
From 2004 to 2013, Move was a member of the Formula 1 team. He participated in charity matches against Prince Albert of Monaco's team "All Stars," "Move the Kart," as well as in charity races "Celebrities for Children."

== Business ==
In 2012, Move opened the MOVE KART / MOVE BAR karting entertainment center in Moscow (he was the founder and owner of the center).

In 2014, Move founded the MOVE children's karting school in Moscow - its drivers won numerous championships and titles.

Move is also a businessman and mentor, delivering lectures and training programs.

== Racing record ==
=== Career summary ===
Season	Series	Team	Races	Wins	Poles	F/Laps	Podiums	Points	Position
2005	3000 Pro Series	CEK Racing	1	0	0	0	0	0	24th
2006	F3000 International Masters	ADM Motorsport	7	0	0	?	1	11	16th
2007	Formula Renault 3.5 Series	Interwetten.com	16	0	0	0	0	0	29th
2007	International Formula Master	Alan Racing	4	0	1	0	0	8	18th
2008	Formula Renault 3.5 Series	KTR	9	0	0	0	0	6	22nd
2009	Formula Renault 3.5 Series	P1 Motorsport	17	0	1	0	2	49	10th
2010	Formula Renault 3.5 Series	Junior Lotus Racing	15	0	0	0	0	9	21st
2011	Formula Renault 3.5 Series	P1 Motorsport	17	0	0	0	2	54	10th
2012	Formula Renault 3.5 Series	P1 Motorsport	17	0	0	0	1	29	17th
2013	Formula Renault 3.5 Series	SMP Racing by Comtec	17	0	0	0	0	12	22nd
2013	Blancpain Endurance Series	SMP Racing	3	0	0	0	0	1	32nd
2026	GT World Challenge Europe Endurance Cup	Ziggo Sport – Tempesta Racing							
2026	GT World Challenge Europe Sprint Cup	Ziggo Sport – Tempesta Racing							

=== Complete International Formula Master results ===
(key) (Races in bold indicate pole position) (Races in italics indicate fastest lap)

Year	Team	1	2	3	4	5	6	7	8	9	10	11	12	13	14	15	16	Pos	Points
2005	CEK Team	VAL	IMO	SPA	MUG	MIS	LAU	ADR	MNZ; Ret									NC	0
2006	ADM Motorsport	MNZ; 1 Ret	MNZ; 2 DNS	MAG; 1; 4	MAG; 2 Ret	BRH; 1 Ret	BRH; 2 Ret	OSC; 1; 3	OSC; 2; 11	BRN; 1	BRN; 2	IST; 1	IST; 2	EST; 1	EST; 2	EST; 3	EST; 4	17th	11
2007	Alan Racing	VAL; 1	VAL; 2	PAU; 1	PAU; 2	BRN; 1	BRN; 2	BOA; 1	BOA; 2	AND; 1	AND; 2	OSC; 1; 22	OSC; 2; 13	BRH; 1	BRH; 2	**MNZ**; **1**; 6	MNZ; 2; 4	18th	8

=== Complete Formula Renault 3.5 Series results ===
(key) (Races in bold indicate pole position) (Races in italics indicate fastest lap)

Year	Team	1	2	3	4	5	6	7	8	9	10	11	12	13	14	15	16	17	Pos	Points
2007	Interwetten.com	MNZ; 1; 15	MNZ; 2; 16	NÜR; 1; 12	NÜR; 2; 12	MON; 1 DNQ	HUN; 1; 21	HUN; 2; 19	SPA; 1; 16	SPA; 2; 16	DON; 1; 22	DON; 2; 17	MAG; 1; 14	MAG; 2; 19	EST; 1; 21	EST; 2; 18	CAT; 1; 22	CAT; 2; 14	29th	0
2008	KTR	MNZ; 1; 13	MNZ; 2; 13	SPA; 1; 11	SPA; 2; 5	MON; 1; 22	SIL; 1 Ret	SIL; 2; 23	HUN; 1; 16	HUN; 2; 20	NÜR; 1	NÜR; 2	BUG; 1	BUG; 2	EST; 1	EST; 2	CAT; 1	CAT; 2	22nd	6
2009	P1 Motorsport	CAT; 1; 14	CAT; 2; 12	SPA; 1; 5	SPA; 2; 4	MON; 1 Ret	HUN; 1; 12	HUN; 2; 9	SIL; 1; 18	SIL; 2; 8	BUG; 1; 11	BUG; 2; 19	ALG; 1 Ret	ALG; 2; 10	**NÜR**; **1**; 3	NÜR; 2; 9	ALC; 1; 4	ALC; 2; 3	10th	49
2010	Junior Lotus Racing	ALC; 1; 9	ALC; 2; 7	SPA; 1; 16	SPA; 2; 20	MON; 1; 10	BRN; 1 Ret	BRN; 2 Ret	MAG; 1; 12	MAG; 2 Ret	HUN; 1 Ret	HUN; 2; 14	HOC; 1; 17	HOC; 2; 16	SIL; 1; 9	SIL; 2; 19	CAT; 1	CAT; 2	21st	9
2011	P1 Motorsport	ALC; 1; 5	ALC; 2; 18	SPA; 1; 6	SPA; 2; 13	MNZ; 1; 3	MNZ; 2 Ret	MON; 1; 17	NÜR; 1; 17	NÜR; 2; 18	HUN; 1 Ret	HUN; 2; 14	SIL; 1; 13	SIL; 2 NC	LEC; 1; 7	LEC; 2 Ret	CAT; 1; 3	CAT; 2; 14	10th	54
2012	P1 Motorsport	ALC; 1; 17	ALC; 2; 7	MON; 1; 15	SPA; 1; 14	SPA; 2; 14	NÜR; 1; 15	NÜR; 2; 7	MSC; 1; 9	MSC; 2; 11	SIL; 1 Ret	SIL; 2; 14	HUN; 1; 17	HUN; 2; 15	LEC; 1; 3	LEC; 2; 25†	CAT; 1; 21	CAT; 2; 16	17th	29
2013	SMP Racing by Comtec	MNZ; 1 Ret	MNZ; 2 NC	ALC; 1; 21	ALC; 2; 15	MON; 1; 13	SPA; 1; 8	SPA; 2 Ret	MSC; 1; 17	MSC; 2; 9	RBR; 1; 14	RBR; 2; 17	HUN; 1; 18	HUN; 2 Ret	LEC; 1; 9	LEC; 2; 21	CAT; 1; 8	CAT; 2 Ret	22nd	12
