= Pro Motorsport =

Pro Motorsport is the name of:

- Pro Motorsport (Italian racing team) (established in 2002), defunct Italian racing team
- Pro Motorsport (British racing team) (established in 2015), British racing team
