= P1 Motorsport =

(United Kingdom) P1 Motorsport
- Founded: 1990
- Folded: 2013
- Team principal(s): Nick Leventis
- Former series: World Series by Renault; British Formula 3
- Drivers' Championships: 2008 World Series by Renault (van der Garde)

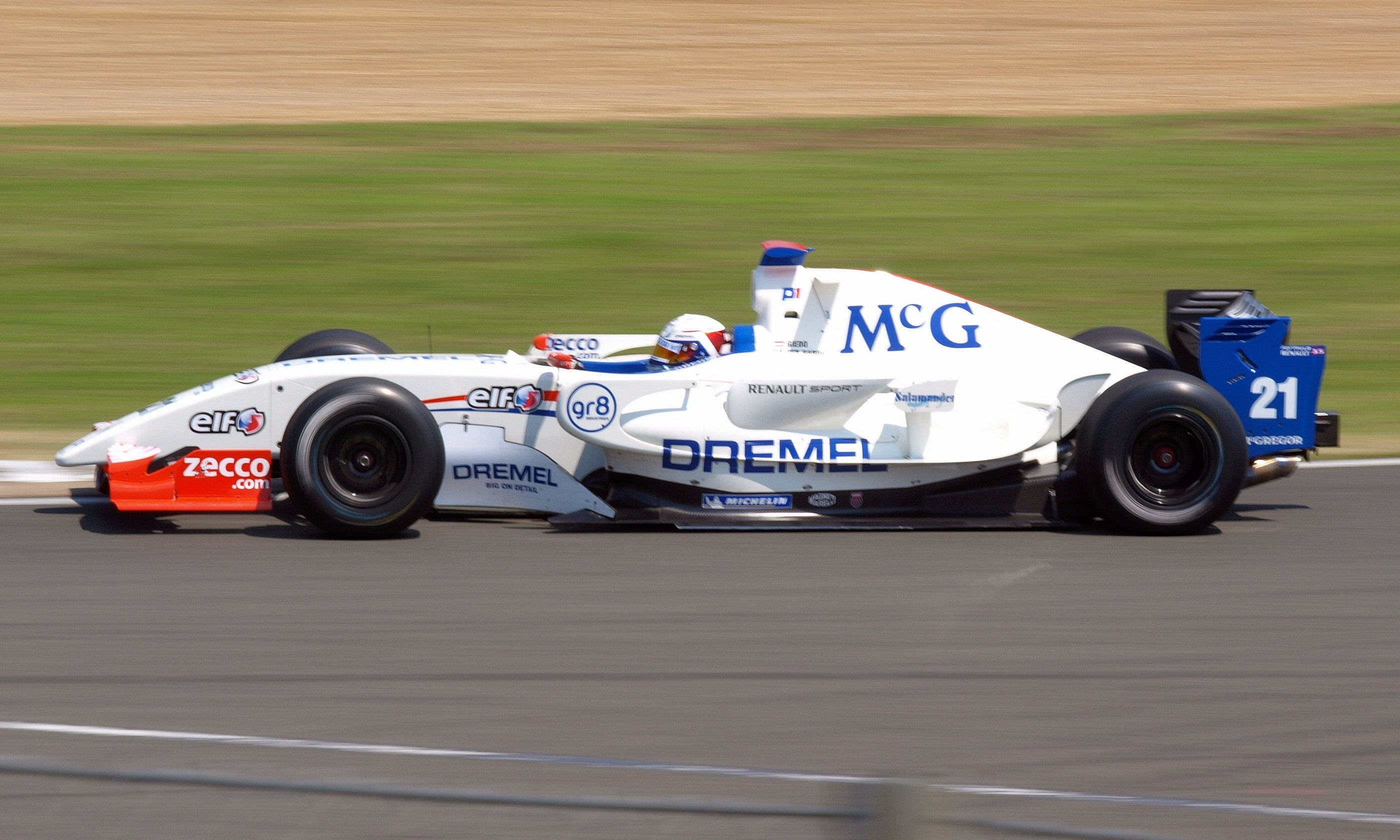
Shown at Siverstone in 2008.

P1 Motorsport was a British racing team based in Norfolk, England. They formerly compete in the World Series by Renault. In 2013, the team was purchased by Strakka Racing owner-driver Nick Leventis and was renamed to P1 by Strakka Racing.

== British Formula 3 ==
The team was founded in 1990 by British former Brabham and Lotus F1 engineer Roly Vincini under the name P1 Motorsport and Engineering. In 1992, they entered the British Formula 3 Championship with a three-car team, running under the P1 Racing banner. In their debut season, they finished fifth in the Drivers' championship. The following season they raced under the name P1 Engineering before leaving the series at the end of the year.

After an absence of ten years, the team returned to the series in 2003 as P1 Racing, running a single car for Canadian driver Billy Asaro, who finished the year in fifteenth place. In 2004, the team changed its name again to P1 Motorsport, running Northern Irish driver Adam Carroll and Venezuelan Ernesto Viso. Carroll scored five victories during the year to finish as runner-up to Nelson Piquet Jr. with Viso taking a single win at Knockhill before leaving the team mid-season to join the Formula 3000 series. He was replaced by Malaysian driver Fairuz Fauzy.

In 2005, the team ran Brazilian Danilo Dirani in the Championship class and Mexican Salvador Durán in the National class (for older chassis). Dirani won the first two races of the season at Donington Park and took a further three podiums to finish sixth overall, while Durán took nine class wins to comfortably win the National class title. The team withdrew from the championship at the end of the year.

== World Series by Renault ==
In 2007, P1 Motorsport linked-up with Italian team Cram Competition for an assault on the World Series by Renault, with the team being branded as Cram By P1 Europe. Running with drivers Fairuz Fauzy and Briton Pippa Mann, the team finished eleventh in the Teams' championship after scoring three podium finishes.

For the 2008 season, they officially became known as P1 Motorsport with Giedo van der Garde joining the team alongside Pippa Mann. van der Garde took eight podiums during the season, including five race wins, to win the title with two races to spare. Mann scored two points finishes to finish twenty-fifth in the standings. P1 also finished third in the Teams' championship behind Ultimate Signature and champions Tech 1 Racing.

In 2009, P1 ran James Walker and Daniil Move in their two cars. Walker finished 5th in the championship, while Move ended the season in 10th. Before the Nurburgring round P1's factory caught fire, destroying nearly all the team's assets. They ended up tooling up a new workshop in Hethel Engineering Centre, near Norwich.

== Complete series results ==
=== Formula Renault 3.5 ===
Formula Renault 3.5 Results
Year	Car	Drivers	Races	Wins	Poles	F.L.	Points	D.C.	T.C.
2008	Dallara T08-Renault	(Netherlands) Giedo van der Garde	15	5	2	3	137	1st	3rd
2008	Dallara T08-Renault	(United Kingdom) Pippa Mann	17	0	0	0	5	25th	3rd
2009	Dallara T08-Renault	(United Kingdom) James Walker	17	1	0	2	89	5th	3rd
2009	Dallara T08-Renault	(Russia) Daniil Move	17	0	1	0	49	10th	3rd
2010	Dallara T08-Renault	(Austria) Walter Grubmüller	17	0	0	0	16	16th	11th
2010	Dallara T08-Renault	(Czech Republic) Jan Charouz	15	0	0	0	16	18th	11th
2010	Dallara T08-Renault	(New Zealand) Brendon Hartley	2	0	0	0	0	10th^{1}	11th
2011	Dallara T08-Renault	(Austria) Walter Grubmüller	14	0	0	0	24	18th	6th
2011	Dallara T08-Renault	(United Kingdom) Adam Carroll	2	0	0	0	27	17th	6th
2011	Dallara T08-Renault	(Russia) Daniil Move	17	0	0	0	54	10th	6th
2012	Dallara FR35/12-Renault	(Austria) Walter Grubmüller	17	0	0	0	42	14th	11th
2012	Dallara FR35/12-Renault	(Russia) Daniil Move	17	0	0	0	29	17th	11th

Notes:

- 1. – Hartley also scored 50 points for Tech 1 Racing in 11 races.
