= Sergey Zlobin =

Russian racing driver

- Nationality: (Russia) Russian
- Born: Sergey Yuryevich Zlobin; May 29, 1970 (age 56) Moscow, Russian SFSR
- Relatives: Daniil Move (brother); Nikita Zlobin (son)
- Categorisation: FIA Silver (until 2013); FIA Bronze (2014–)
- Years active: 2001–2014

Sergey Yuryevich Zlobin (Russian: Серге́й Ю́рьевич Зло́бин, IPA: [sɪrˈɡʲej ˈjʉrʲjɪvʲɪdʑ ˈzlobʲɪn]; born 29 May 1970) is a Russian racing driver, who competed twice in the 24 Hours of Le Mans alongside being a test driver for Minardi.

== Career ==
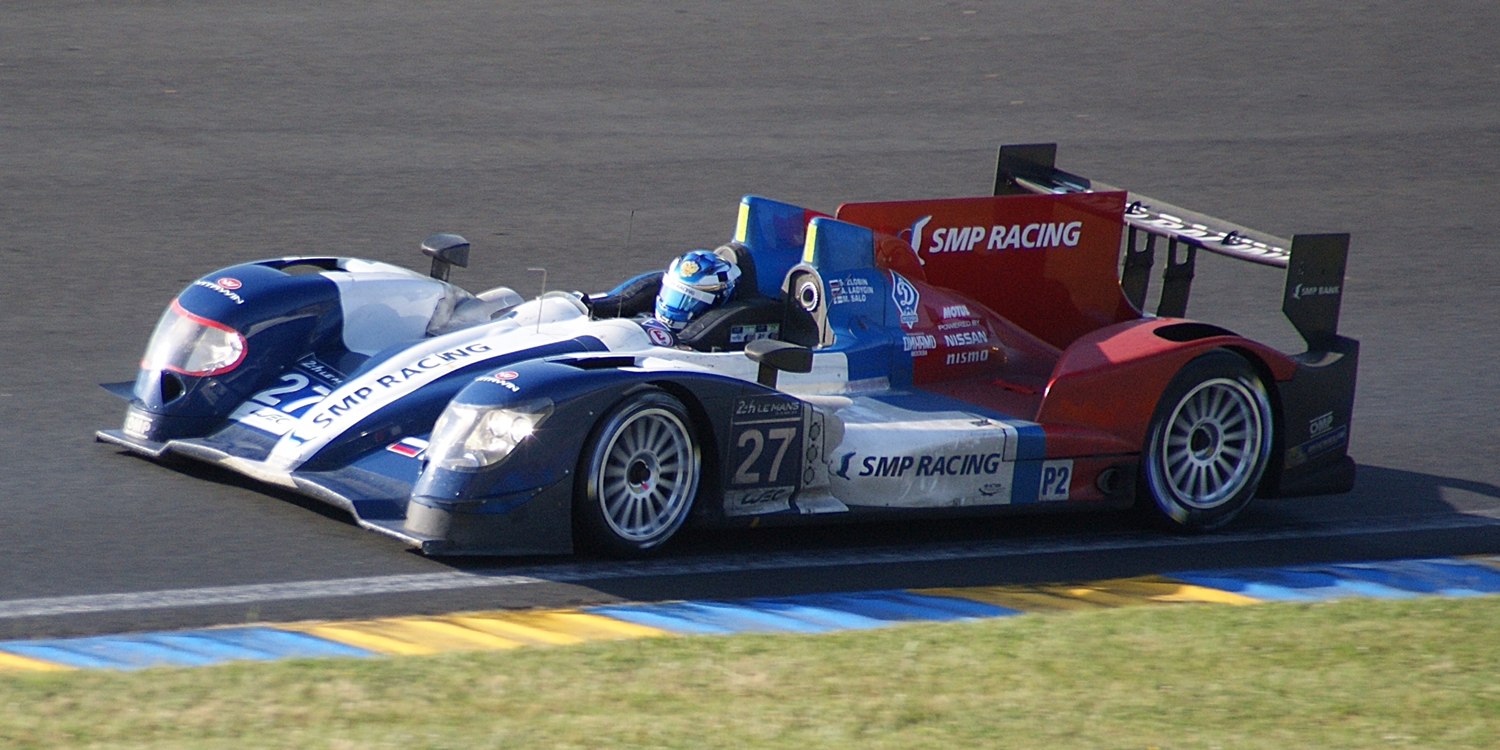
The SMP Racing car which Zlobin, alongside Mika Salo and Anton Ladygin used in the 2014 Le Mans 24h

Zlobin began racing in 1996 at the later age of 26, and took part in several competitions, such as Danian Cup in rallycross. In 1998, he made a switch to single-seater racing, initially competing in Russian Formula Three Championship and Euro Formula 3000 for several years.

In August 2002, Zlobin was announced as a test driver for the Minardi Formula One team, becoming the first Russian to test a Formula 1 car. His signing was a part of the sponsorship deal that Minardi made with Gazprom, brokered by Oksana Kosachenko. However, Gazprom paid only 2 million dollars out the promised 9 million during the season, which led to the contract breaking down. After a one-year hiatus, Zlobin returned to motorsport in 2004, and continued the testing programme with Minardi.

Zlobin competed at Le Mans twice, in 2005 and 2014. He competed in a number of GT and Endurance racing series, including the FIA GT Championship, Blancpain Endurance Series and European Le Mans Series.

== Personal life ==
On 24 September 2007, Zlobin survived a car bomb which had been planted in his Mercedes-Benz G500. The explosion caused minor injuries to Zlobin's legs, but he was able to get out of the vehicle himself to call police.

Zlobin's son Nikita, born in 1996, is also a racing driver who raced in junior single-seaters.

== Career summary ==
Season	Series	Team	Races	Wins	Poles	F/Laps	Podiums	Points	Position
2001	Euro Formula 3000 Championship	ADM Motorsport	1	0	0	0	0	0	NC
2002	Euro Formula 3000 Championship	B&C Competition	6	0	0	0	0	0	NC
2002	Formula One	Minardi	Test driver						
2004	FIA GT Championship - GT	Graham Nash Motorsport	3	0	0	0	0	1	50th
2004	FIA GT Championship - GT	JMB Racing	3	0	0	0	0	1	50th
2004	Euro Formula 3000 Championship	NBC Group	1	0	0	0	0	0	NC
2004	Formula One	Minardi	Test driver						
2005	24 Hours of Le Mans	Intersport Racing/Cirtek Motorsport	1	0	0	0	0	N/A	48th
2005	3000 Pro Series	CEK Racing	1	0	0	0	0	0	22nd
2006	FIA GT Championship	BMS Scuderia Italia	8	0	0	0	0	0	NC
2013	Blancpain Endurance Series	SMP Racing	5	0	0	0	0	1	32nd
2013	European Le Mans Series - LMP2	SMP Racing	3	0	0	0	9	28	12th
2014	FIA World Endurance Championship - LMP2	SMP Racing	8	1	0	0	6	146	1st
2014	European Le Mans Series - GTE	SMP Racing	5	2	0	0	3	85	1st
2014	24 Hours of Le Mans - LMP2	SMP Racing	1	0	0	0	0	N/A	12th

=== 24 Hours of Le Mans results ===
Year	Team	Co-Drivers	Car	Class	Laps	Pos.	Class Pos.
2005	(United States) Intersport Racing (United Kingdom) Cirtek Motorsport	(Denmark) Juan Barazi (France) Bastien Brière	Courage C65-AER	LMP2	30	DNF	DNF
2014	(Russia) SMP Racing	(Russia) Anton Ladygin (Finland) Mika Salo	Oreca 03R-Nissan	LMP2	303	37th	12th

Sporting positions
Preceded by Bertrand Baguette; Ricardo González; Martin Plowman	FIA Endurance Trophy for LMP2 Drivers; 2014	Succeeded by Sam Bird; Julien Canal; Roman Rusinov
