= Pro Motorsport (Italian racing team) =

(Italy) Pro Motorsport
- Founded: 2002
- Team principal(s): Salvatore Tavano
- Former series: International Formula Master; Italian Superturismo Championship
- Drivers' Championships: 2005 3000 Pro Series season (Max Busnelli)

Pro Motorsport is an auto racing team based in Italy.

== History ==
=== International Formula Master ===
Pro Motorsport raced in International Formula Master from its inaugural season in 2005 up until the end of the 2008 season.

In 2005, with the series known as the 3000 Pro Series, Pro Motorsport performed solidly and their driver Max Busnelli was crowned champion. Busnelli collected two wins for the team on his way to the drivers' title. The team finished third in the overall standings.

The renamed 2006 F3000 International Masters season saw Pro Motorsport finish second in the teams' standings and they collected another win, from driver Davide di Benedetto. In 2007, they won the last race of the season to end up fourth in the team's championship - the race was won by Marcello Puglisi.

They haven't returned since the 2008 International Formula Master season in which they won another race to make a total of five in their four years in the series. Marcello Puglisi won again but the team only finished in eleventh place overall having only raced in select events throughout the season.
