= Max Busnelli =

Italian racing driver

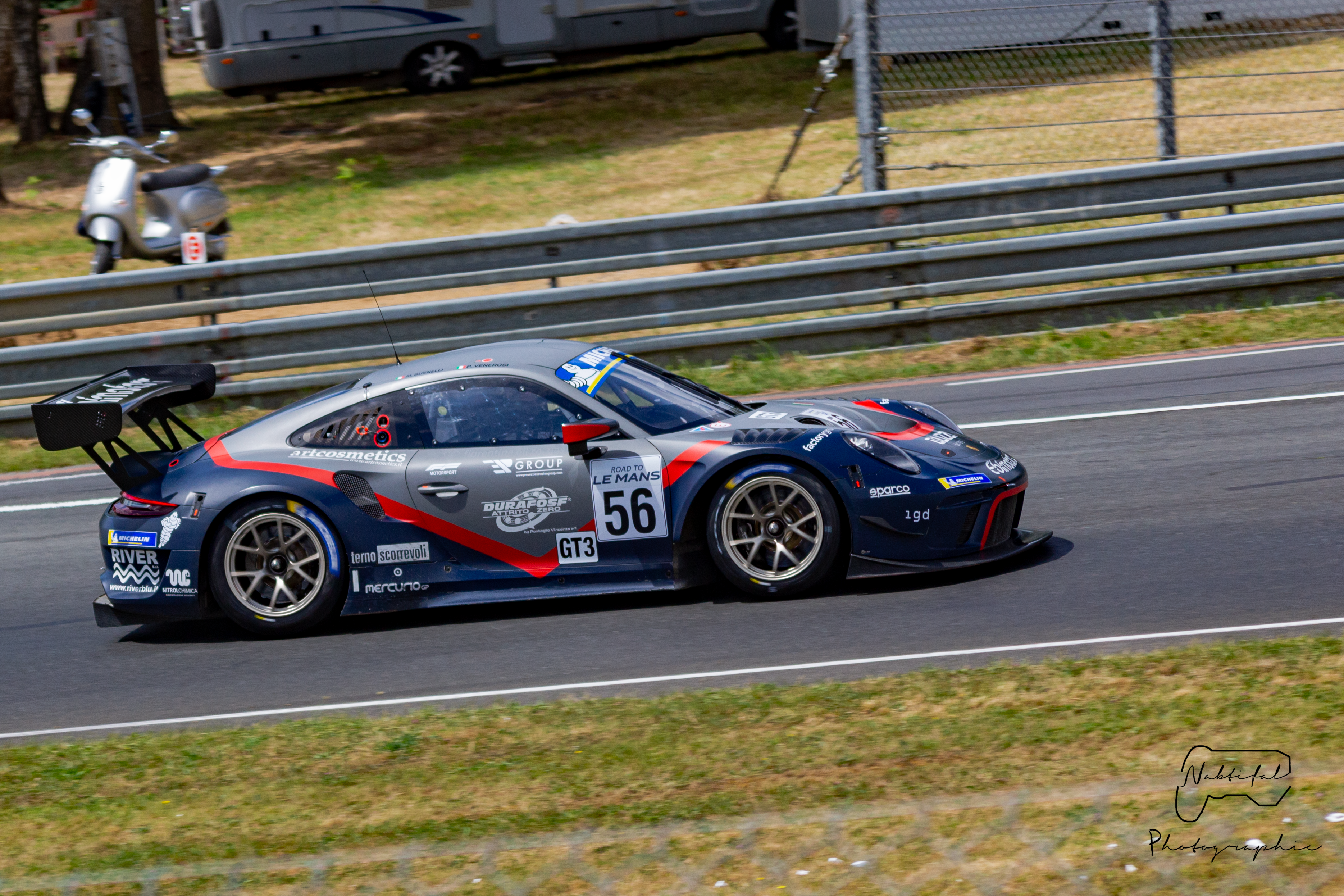
- Busnelli in 2022
- Nationality: (Italy) Italian
- Born: Massimiliano Busnelli; 14 December 1975 (age 50) Seregno, Italy
- Categorisation: FIA Gold (until 2016); FIA Silver (2017–)

Championship titles
- 2008 2005 1996: Italian GT Championship - GT2; 3000 Pro Series; Formula Renault Campus Italy

Massimiliano "Max" Busnelli (born 14 December 1975) is a racing car driver from Italy. He was the inaugural 3000 Pro Series champion and drove for Italy in A1 Grand Prix, before embarking on a sports car racing career that yielded an Italian GT title in 2008.

Busnelli is currently a Porsche instructor and operation manager for Porsche Carrera Cup Italy.

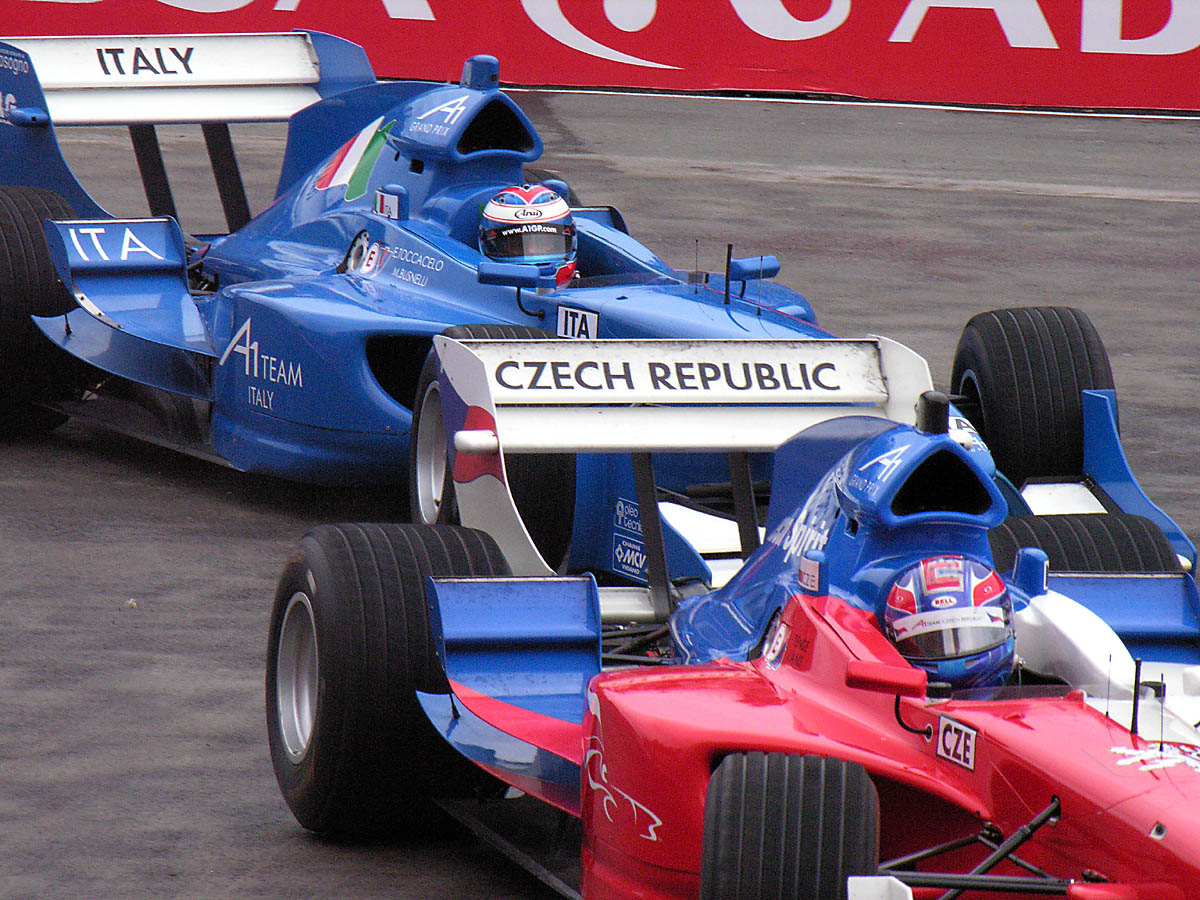
Busnelli at the 2005–06 A1 Grand Prix of Nations, South Africa in Durban.

== Racing record ==
=== Complete F3000 International Masters results ===
(key) (Races in bold indicate pole position) (Races in italics indicate fastest lap)

Year	Entrant	1	2	3	4	5	6	7	8	9	10	11	12	13	14	15	16	DC	Points
2005	Pro Motorsport	VAL; Ret	IMO; 2	SPA; 2	**MUG**; 1	**MIS** 10	LAU; 4	ADR; 2	MNZ; 1									1st	49
2006	Pro Motorsport	**MNZ**; **1** Ret	MNZ; 2; 10	MAG; 1	MAG; 2	BRH; 1	BRH; 2	OSC; 1	OSC; 2	BRN; 1	BRN; 2	IST; 1	IST; 2	EST; 1	EST; 2	EST; 3	EST; 4	28th	0

=== Complete A1 Grand Prix results ===
(key) (Races in bold indicate pole position) (Races in italics indicate fastest lap)

Year	Entrant	1	2	3	4	5	6	7	8	9	10	11	12	13	14	15	16	17	18	19	20	21	22	DC	Points
2005–06	Italy	GBR; SPR	GBR; FEA	GER; SPR	GER; FEA	POR; SPR	POR; FEA	AUS; SPR	AUS; FEA	MYS; SPR	MYS; FEA	UAE; SPR	UAE; FEA	RSA; SPR; Ret	RSA; FEA; 6	IDN; SPR; 14	IDN; FEA; Ret	MEX; SPR	MEX; FEA	USA; SPR	USA; FEA	CHN; SPR	CHN; FEA	14th	46

=== 24 Hours of Spa results ===
Year	Team	Co-Drivers	Car	Class	Laps	Pos.	Class Pos.
2007	(Italy) Scuderia Playteam Sarafree	(Italy) Giambattista Giannoccaro (Belgium) Yves Lambert (Germany) Alex Müller	Maserati MC12 GT1	GT1	458	18th	9th

Sporting positions
Preceded by none	3000 Pro Series champion 2005	Succeeded by Jan Charouz
