= Ignazio Belluardo =

Italian racing driver

- Nationality: (Italy) Italian
- Born: 2 August 1986 (age 40) Syracuse (Italy)

Ignazio Belluardo (born 2 August 1986, in Syracuse) is an Italian racing driver. He has competed in such series as International Formula Master, winning twice during the 2006 season.
