= Timo Lienemann =

German racing driver

- Nationality: (Germany) German
- Born: 15 May 1985 (age 41) Schorndorf (Germany)

Timo Lienemann (born 15 May 1985 in Schorndorf, Baden-Württemberg) is a German former racing driver. He has competed in such series as 3000 Pro Series, F3000 International Masters and Formula BMW ADAC.
