= Fausto Ippoliti =

Italian racing driver from Rome (born 1979)

Fausto Ippoliti (born 25 May 1979) is an Italian racing driver from Rome.

== Fausto Ippoliti's Career ==
1997: 4th Italian Formula Campus

1999: 3rd Italian Formula 3 Federal

2000: 13th Formula Renault 2000 Eurocup

2001: 5th Formula Renault 2000 Eurocup

2002: 5th Italian Formula 3 Championship (three podiums).

2003: 1st Italian Formula 3 Championship

2004: 7th Euro Formula 3000

2005: 7th Euro Formula 3000

2006: 12th Euro Formula 3000, 21st Formula 3000 Masters

Sporting positions
Preceded by Miloš Pavlović	Italian Formula Three Champion; 2003	Succeeded by Matteo Cressoni
