= International Formula Master =

Former Single-Seater Racing Championship

- Category: Single seaters
- Country: Europe
- Inaugural season: 2005
- Folded: 2009
- Drivers: 23 (2009)
- Teams: 10 (2009)
- Constructors: Tatuus
- Engine suppliers: 2.0 litre Honda
- Tyre suppliers: Avon (2005–2006); Yokohama (2007–2009)
- Last Drivers' champion: (Switzerland) Fabio Leimer
- Last Teams' champion: (Italy) JD Motorsport

International Formula Master, also known as Formula Super 2000, was a European-based junior single seater formula. The series was conceived as a competitor for Formula Three and made its debut at Valencia in 2007. European television channel Eurosport were backing the series and the series regularly supported the World Touring Car Championship during its European races.

The championship started in 2005 as the 3000 Pro Series, organised by Peroni Promotion and based in Italy; it used Lola B99/50 chassis alongside 2002 cars. MTC Organisation took over for 2006 and renamed it F3000 International Masters, running a support series to the WTCC. In 2007 this series changed regulations, with N.Technology now running technical operations for MTC Organisation, and it became the International Formula Master. N.Technology had previously been involved in motorsport as an Alfa Romeo works team.

== History ==
The 2010 season was due to be the fourth under the International Formula Master name. As with previous seasons, the series was to support the World Touring Car Championship, consisting of seven double-header events beginning on 22 May at Autodromo Nazionale Monza in Italy and ending on 19 September at the Circuit de Valencia. It was due to be the first year that the series included secondary Light Class, and was to be broadcast live on Eurosport. There were two test sessions on 6 November and 7, 2009 at the Hungaroring. Nico Müller and Philip Forsman were the fastest drivers on each day, which would ultimately prove to be the last outings for an IFM car.

== Venues ==
The championship consisted of eight events, each comprising two races, which were held at a variety of European circuits. Notable venues used included Pau in France, Brands Hatch in Britain, Brno in the Czech Republic, Porto in Portugal, and Monza in Italy. During the International Formula Master years, the series supported the World Touring Car Championship for its European events.

== Technical and sporting regulations ==
The series was a one-make series in that only one type of car was allowed – the Formula 2000 made by Tatuus. The cars were powered by a Honda K20A naturally aspirated engine, built according to the FIA S2000 regulations with approximately 250 HP.

=== Event schedule ===
Each race weekend began on Friday, with two 45-minute practice sessions and a 30-minute qualifying session that decided the starting grid for the first race. There were two races; one of approximately 75 km on Saturday and one of approximately 100 km on Sunday.

With just one qualifying session, the grid for the second race was determined by the results of Race 1. The top eight positions were reversed, giving pole position to the eighth-placed finisher.

=== Scoring system ===
Teams only scored from their two highest placed cars. Feature race pole-winners were awarded one point, whereas no points were given to the reverse-grid pole winner in the sprint race. 19 points was the maximum possible haul for one driver in a race weekend.

International Formula Master points system for race 1
1st	2nd	3rd	4th	5th	6th	7th	8th	Fastest lap
10	8	6	5	4	3	2	1	1

International Formula Master points system for race 2
1st	2nd	3rd	4th	5th	6th	Fastest lap
6	5	4	3	2	1	1

- The scoring system between 2005–2008 was to give the same points given for both races: 10–8–6–5–4–3–2–1.

== Champions ==
Season	Champion	Team Champion	Secondary Class Champion
3000 Pro Series
2005	(Italy) Max Busnelli	(Italy) Draco Junior Team	
F3000 International Masters
2006	(Czech Republic) Jan Charouz	(Czech Republic) Charouz Racing System	
International Formula Master
2007	(Belgium) Jérôme d'Ambrosio	(Italy) Cram Competition	
2008	(New Zealand) Chris van der Drift	(Italy) JD Motorsport	F: (Italy) Marcello Puglisi
2009	(Switzerland) Fabio Leimer	(Italy) JD Motorsport	R: (United States) Alexander Rossi
