= List of Formula Renault 3.5 Series drivers =

This is a List of Formula Renault 3.5 Series drivers, that is, a list of drivers who have made at least one entry in the Formula Renault 3.5 Series. This list does not count drivers who have only appeared in the previous World Series by Nissan and the later World Series Formula V8 3.5. This list is accurate up to the end of the ninth and final round of the 2015 season.

== By name ==
Key
Symbol	Meaning
~	Driver competed in the last Formula One race (the 2026 Japanese Grand Prix)
^	Driver has competed in Formula One but not the last race

Name	Nation	Seasons	Championship titles	Races (Starts)	Poles (Note: Reverse-grid pole positions not included.)	Wins	Podiums	Fastest Laps	Points
Daniel Abt	Germany	2012	0	6	0	0	0	0	0
Sergey Afanasyev	Russia	2008	0	6	0	0	0	0	0
Riccardo Agostini	Italy	2013	0	2	0	0	0	0	0
Filipe Albuquerque	Portugal	2007–2008	0	21	0	1	2	1	93
Aleix Alcaraz	Spain	2008	0	17	0	0	0	0	5
Mikhail Aleshin	Russia	2006–2008; 2010–2013	1 (2010)	104 (103)	4	4	15	3	379
Jaime Alguersuari^	Spain	2009	0	17	1	1	3	1	88
Zoël Amberg	Switzerland	2012–2014	0	51	0	0	1	1	75
Michael Ammermüller	Germany	2007	0	6 (5)	0	0	0	0	12
Richard Antinucci	United States	2005	0	2	0	0	0	0	0
Philo Paz Armand	Indonesia	2015	0	11	0	0	0	0	1
Bertrand Baguette	Belgium	2007–2009	1 (2009)	51	2	6	13	2	103
Álvaro Barba	Spain	2006–2008	0	51 (50)	0	1	5	5	9
Marco Barba	Spain	2006, 2008–2009	0	40	2	0	2	0	24
Sven Barth	Germany	2005	0	1	0	0	0	0	0
Ivan Bellarosa	Italy	2005	0	17 (16)	0	0	0	0	0
Mehdi Bennani	Morocco	2005–2006	0	18 (16)	0	0	0	0	0
Nathanaël Berthon	France	2010–2011	0	34	0	1	5	0	97
Jules Bianchi^	France	2009, 2012	0	18	5	3	8	7	185
René Binder	Austria	2015	0	2	0	0	0	0	4
Sam Bird	United Kingdom	2012	0	17	1	2	7	0	179
Marco Bonanomi	Italy	2006–2008	0	38 (36)	1	0	3	1	105
Alessandro Bonetti	Italy	2006	0	11	0	0	0	0	0
Bruno Bonifacio	Brazil	2015	0	15	0	0	0	0	1
Will Bratt	United Kingdom	2015	0	2	0	0	0	0	0
William Buller	United Kingdom	2013–2014	0	27	0	0	1	0	76
Yelmer Buurman	Netherlands	2007	0	4	0	0	0	0	15
Sergio Canamasas	Spain	2010–2011	0	34 (33)	1	0	1	2	69
Claudio Cantelli	Brazil	2008	0	15	0	0	0	0	3
Fabio Carbone	Brazil	2005, 2008	0	21	1	3	6	2	104
Adam Carroll	United Kingdom	2011	0	2	0	0	1	0	27
Alfonso Celis Jr.	Mexico	2014–2015	0	19	0	0	0	2	17
Karun Chandhok^	India	2005	0	7 (5)	0	0	0	0	0
Jan Charouz	Czech Republic	2010–2011	0	32	0	0	0	1	26
Max Chilton^	United Kingdom	2009	0	1	0	0	0	0	0
Alessandro Ciompi	Italy	2007	0	13 (12)	0	0	0	0	0
Dani Clos	Spain	2009	0	4	0	0	0	0	5
Stefano Coletti	Monaco	2009–2010	0	18	0	0	5	0	77
Máximo Cortés	Spain	2008	0	7	0	0	0	0	5
Albert Costa	Spain	2010–2011	0	34	1	1	7	1	229
Gavin Cronje	South Africa	2006	0	2	0	0	0	0	0
Yann Cunha	Brazil	2012–2013	0	34	0	0	0	0	0
Siso Cunill	Spain	2008	0	8	0	0	0	0	1
Jérôme d'Ambrosio^	Belgium	2006	0	7	0	0	0	0	0
Alx Danielsson	Sweden	2005–2006	1 (2006)	29 (26)	3	4	5	2	145
Daniël de Jong	Netherlands	2011	0	17	0	0	0	0	2
Nyck de Vries^	Netherlands	2015	0	17	1	1	6	1	160
Louis Delétraz	Switzerland	2015	0	2	0	0	0	0	0
Pasquale Di Sabatino	Italy	2006–2009	0	55	0	1	3	0	57
Tom Dillmann	France	2015	0	17	1	0	2	1	122
Danilo Dirani	Brazil	2005	0	2	0	0	0	0	0
Salvador Durán	Mexico	2007–2010	0	40 (39)	1	2	7	3	125
Tio Ellinas	Cyprus	2015	0	17	2	2	3	1	135
Pietro Fantin	Brazil	2013–2015	0	47	0	0	2	3	109
Fairuz Fauzy	Malaysia	2007–2009, 2011	0	57	3	1	10	1	181
António Félix da Costa	Portugal	2012–2013	0	29	1	7	12	4	338
Colin Fleming	United States	2005–2006	0	21 (17)	0	0	1	0	53
Alex Fontana	Switzerland	2015	0	1	0	0	0	0	2
Lucas Foresti	Brazil	2012–2013	0	34 (33)	0	0	0	0	8
Gregory Franchi	Belgium	2006	0	17	0	0	1	0	10
Robin Frijns	Netherlands	2012	1 (2012)	17	4	3	8	1	189
Ryo Fukuda	Japan	2005–2006	0	34	0	0	0	0	36
Borja García	Spain	2006, 2008	0	22 (21)	0	1	7	0	112
Víctor García	Spain	2010	0	17	0	0	0	0	4
Pierre Gasly~	France	2014	0	17	1	0	8	3	192
Sean Gelael	Indonesia	2015	0	17	0	0	0	0	7
Luca Ghiotto	Italy	2014	0	17	0	0	0	0	26
Vittorio Ghirelli	Italy	2012	0	17	0	0	0	0	5
Raffaele Giammaria	Italy	2005	0	6 (4)	0	0	0	0	0
Tristan Gommendy	France	2005–2006	0	21	2	1	6	3	112
Walter Grubmüller	Austria	2010–2012	0	49 (48)	0	0	1	0	82
Esteban Guerrieri	Argentina	2007–2010	0	31 (30)	5	7	10	5	200
Ben Hanley	United Kingdom	2005–2007	0	36	0	2	7	6	147
Brendon Hartley^	New Zealand	2009–2011	0	43 (42)	1	0	5	7	171
Tobias Hegewald	Germany	2009	0	2	0	0	0	0	0
Michael Herck	Romania	2007, 2009	0	21 (20)	0	0	0	0	7
Carlos Huertas	Colombia	2012–2013	0	34	0	1	1	1	65
Carlos Iaconelli	Brazil	2005–2007	0	31	0	0	0	0	13
Jazeman Jaafar	Malaysia	2013–2015	0	49	1	1	7	1	215
Oliver Jarvis	United Kingdom	2006	0	2	0	0	0	0	0
Bruce Jouanny	France	2006	0	17	0	0	0	0	7
Julien Jousse	France	2007–2008	0	34	1	1	2	1	168
Edwin Jowsey	United Kingdom	2006	0	2 (1)	0	0	0	0	0
Yu Kanamaru	Japan	2015	0	6	0	0	0	0	9
Steven Kane	United Kingdom	2006	0	17	0	0	0	1	15
Richard Keen	United Kingdom	2006	0	2	0	0	0	0	0
Robbie Kerr	United Kingdom	2006	0	17	0	0	0	1	20
Charlie Kimball	United States	2007	0	13	0	0	0	0	7
Tamás Pal Kiss	Hungary	2012	0	4	0	0	0	0	9
Pascal Kochem	Germany	2006	0	2	0	0	0	0	0
Kevin Korjus	Estonia	2011–2012	0	34 (33)	0	3	5	1	189
Tomáš Kostka	Czech Republic	2005–2006	0	24 (22)	0	0	0	0	11
Robert Kubica^	Poland	2005	1 (2005)	17	3	4	11	1	154
Keisuke Kunimoto	Japan	2009–2010	0	21	0	0	0	0	8
Daniel la Rosa	Germany	2005	0	13 (11)	0	0	1	0	18
Matias Laine	Finland	2013–2014	0	34	0	0	0	0	49
Nicholas Latifi^	Canada	2014–2015	0	23	0	0	1	1	75
Omar Leal	Colombia	2009–2010	0	34	0	0	1	0	22
Federico Leo	Italy	2009–2010	0	34	0	0	0	0	24
Alex Lloyd	United Kingdom	2005	0	1	0	0	0	0	0
Xavier Maassen	Netherlands	2007	0	17	0	0	0	0	0
Kevin Magnussen^	Denmark	2012–2013	1 (2013)	34	11	6	16	4	380
Pastor Maldonado^	Venezuela	2005–2006	0	26 (25)	5	3	6	6	107
Gustav Malja	Sweden	2015	0	17	0	0	2	0	79
Pippa Mann	United Kingdom	2007–2008	0	34 (33)	0	0	0	0	6
Greg Mansell	United Kingdom	2009–2010	0	32	0	0	0	0	27
Mihai Marinescu	Romania	2009, 2013	0	19	0	0	0	0	5
Alexandre Marsoin	France	2008–2009	0	19 (18)	0	0	0	0	17
John Martin	Australia	2009	0	7	0	0	0	0	0
Marcos Martínez	Spain	2006, 2008–2009, 2011	0	42 (41)	1	4	5	1	94
Nikolay Martsenko	Russia	2012–2014	0	39	0	0	1	0	69
Roman Mavlanov	Russia	2014	0	17	0	0	0	0	0
Sean McIntosh	Canada	2006	0	17 (16)	1	0	2	0	63
Daniel McKenzie	United Kingdom	2011	0	17	0	0	0	0	0
Nigel Melker	Netherlands	2012–2013	0	19	0	0	4	2	151
Bruno Méndez	Spain	2009–2010	0	17 (16)	0	0	0	0	5
Matteo Meneghello	Italy	2005–2006	0	22 (20)	0	0	0	0	3
Roberto Merhi^	Spain	2014–2015	0	25 (24)	3	3	7	1	209
Celso Míguez	Spain	2005–2007	0	39	0	0	0	0	36
Miguel Molina	Spain	2006–2009	0	51 (50)	2	4	11	3	210
Giorgio Mondini	Switzerland	2005, 2007	0	13 (11)	0	0	0	0	5
Ferdinando Monfardini	Italy	2005	0	2	0	0	0	0	1
Christian Montanari	San Marino	2005–2006	0	34 (33)	3	2	5	1	112
Nil Montserrat	Spain	2006	0	2	0	0	0	0	0
Guillaume Moreau	France	2007–2009	0	36	1	1	4	0	81
Cristiano Morgado	South Africa	2009	0	2	0	0	0	0	0
Edoardo Mortara	Italy	2009	0	4	0	0	0	0	6
Daniil Move	Russia	2007–2013	0	109 (108)	1	0	5	0	159
Nico Müller	Switzerland	2012–2013	0	34	1	2	4	0	221
Norman Nato	France	2013–2014	0	34	2	2	2	1	122
Anton Nebylitskiy	Russia	2009–2012	0	60 (57)	0	0	1	0	54
André Negrão	Brazil	2011–2013, 2015	0	53 (52)	1	0	2	0	111
Roy Nissany	Israel	2015	0	17	0	0	1	0	27
Paolo Maria Nocera	Italy	2008	0	4	0	0	0	0	0
Alejandro Núñez	Spain	2007	0	17	1	1	2	0	31
Esteban Ocon^	France	2014	0	4 (3)	0	0	0	0	2
Egor Orudzhev	Russia	2015	0	17	0	2	4	0	133
Simon Pagenaud	France	2005	0	17 (16)	0	0	0	0	30
Nelson Panciatici	France	2010–2011	0	34 (33)	0	0	1	0	99
Aurélien Panis	France	2015	0	17	0	0	0	0	42
Álvaro Parente	Portugal	2006–2007	1 (2007)	34 (32)	2	5	6	1	225
Damien Pasini	France	2005	0	17	0	0	1	0	33
Miloš Pavlović	Serbia and Montenegro; Serbia	2005–2007	0	51	0	2	7	3	156
Matteo Pellegrino	Italy	2005	0	6	0	0	0	0	0
Sten Pentus	Estonia	2008–2011	0	53	1	2	5	2	92
Franck Perera	France	2006	0	2	0	0	0	0	13
Richard Philippe	France	2007	0	11 (10)	0	0	0	0	0
Arthur Pic	France	2011–2013	0	51	2	1	3	2	188
Charles Pic^	France	2008–2009	0	34 (33)	3	4	7	5	163
Clivio Piccione	Monaco	2007	0	17	1	0	2	1	42
Emmanuel Piget	France	2013	0	2	0	0	0	0	0
Patrick Pilet	France	2005–2006	0	26	0	0	1	0	57
Félix Porteiro	Spain	2005	0	17	4	2	3	2	77
Will Power	Australia	2005	0	15 (13)	3	2	4	0	64
Stefano Proetto	Italy	2005	0	2 (0)	0	0	0	0	0
Nicolas Prost	France	2005	0	2	0	0	0	0	0
Frankie Provenzano	Italy	2009	0	4	0	0	0	0	0
César Ramos	Brazil	2011–2012	0	21	2	0	0	0	47
Luiz Razia	Brazil	2007	0	4	0	0	0	0	0
Fernando Rees	Brazil	2005	0	12	0	0	0	0	0
Daniel Ricciardo^	Australia	2009–2011	0	32 (31)	10	5	14	7	280
Stéphane Richelmi	Monaco	2011	0	17	0	0	0	0	6
Davide Rigon	Italy	2005, 2012	0	6	0	0	0	0	4
Ricardo Risatti	Argentina	2007	0	9	0	0	0	0	0
Andrea Roda	Italy	2014	0	1	0	0	0	0	0
Mario Romancini	Brazil	2008	0	13	0	0	0	0	3
Jake Rosenzweig	United States	2010–2012	0	51 (50)	1	0	0	1	54
Alexander Rossi^	United States	2010–2012	0	35	0	2	7	5	219
James Rossiter	United Kingdom	2006	0	17	0	0	1	0	33
Oliver Rowland	United Kingdom	2014–2015	1 (2015)	34	9	10	20	5	488
Carlos Sainz Jr.~	Spain	2013–2014	1 (2014)	26	7	7	7	6	249
Filip Salaquarda	Czech Republic	2009–2011	0	30 (29)	2	0	2	0	45
Eric Salignon	France	2005–2006	0	30	1	2	3	2	97
Pablo Sánchez López	Mexico	2008	0	17	0	0	0	0	18
Harald Schlegelmilch	Latvia	2009	0	2	0	0	0	0	0
Ryan Sharp	United Kingdom	2005	0	10	0	0	0	0	8
Hayanari Shimoda	Japan	2006	0	15	0	0	0	0	12
Sergey Sirotkin^	Russia	2012–2014	0	35 (34)	1	1	6	0	193
Marco Sørensen	Denmark	2012–2014	0	51	2	3	7	1	279
Andy Soucek	Spain	2006	0	17	1	1	6	0	101
Richie Stanaway	New Zealand	2012, 2014	0	9	0	0	1	0	29
Will Stevens^	United Kingdom	2012–2014	0	51	1	2	10	2	329
Marlon Stöckinger	Philippines	2013–2015	0	42 (41)	0	0	0	2	110
Dean Stoneman	United Kingdom	2010, 2015	0	19	0	0	4	0	130
Dominic Storey	New Zealand	2011	0	2	0	0	0	0	0
Adrien Tambay	France	2011	0	3 (2)	0	0	0	0	6
Jason Tahinciğlu	Turkey	2006	0	2	0	0	0	0	0
Duncan Tappy	United Kingdom	2008	0	8	0	0	0	0	6
Giovanni Tedeschi	Italy	2005	0	17	0	0	0	0	0
Johannes Theobald	Germany	2007	0	2	0	0	0	0	0
Julian Theobald	Germany	2007–2008	0	12	0	0	0	0	0
Enrico Toccacelo	Italy	2005–2006	0	16 (15)	1	1	1	2	45
Óscar Tunjo	Colombia	2014	0	12	0	0	0	0	11
Oliver Turvey	United Kingdom	2009	0	17	2	1	5	0	93
Mathéo Tuscher	Switzerland	2013	0	2	0	0	0	0	0
Cameron Twynham	United Kingdom	2014	0	6	0	0	0	0	0
Aaro Vainio	Finland	2012	0	6	0	0	1	0	27
Alberto Valerio	Brazil	2006–2007, 2009	0	6	0	0	0	0	0
Adrián Vallés	Spain	2005, 2009	0	26 (25)	2	3	7	1	135
Davide Valsecchi	Italy	2006–2007	0	34 (32)	0	1	4	0	80
Meindert van Buuren	Netherlands	2014–2015	0	26	0	0	0	2	41
Chris van der Drift	New Zealand	2007, 2009	0	24	0	0	2	0	84
Giedo van der Garde^	Netherlands	2007–2008	1 (2008)	34 (32)	2	5	8	1	204
Jaap van Lagen	Netherlands	2005–2007	0	28 (25)	0	0	1	1	57
Stoffel Vandoorne^	Belgium	2013	0	17	3	4	10	2	214
Matthieu Vaxivière	France	2014–2015	0	30	5	3	14	5	317
Giovanni Venturini	Italy	2012	0	7	0	0	0	0	3
Jean-Éric Vergne^	France	2010–2011	0	23	4	6	13	1	285
Jean-Karl Vernay	France	2011	0	2	0	0	0	0	0
Frédéric Vervisch	Belgium	2005, 2007	0	11	0	0	0	0	0
Sebastian Vettel^	Germany	2006–2007	0	11 (10)	2	3	6	1	105
Beitske Visser	Netherlands	2014–2015	0	34 (32)	0	0	0	0	14
James Walker	United Kingdom	2007–2009	0	51	1	2	1	2	138
Danny Watts	United Kingdom	2005	0	2	0	0	0	0	0
Oliver Webb	United Kingdom	2011, 2013–2014	0	39 (38)	0	0	0	0	44
Robert Wickens	Canada	2007–2008, 2011	1 (2011)	38	8	6	14	7	302
Lewis Williamson	United Kingdom	2011–2012	0	9	0	0	0	0	0
Markus Winkelhock^	Germany	2005	0	17 (16)	1	3	7	2	114
Nick Yelloly	United Kingdom	2011–2013, 2015	0	26	1	2	5	0	205
Daniel Zampieri	Italy	2010–2012	0	36 (35)	0	0	2	1	80
Christopher Zanella	Switzerland	2013	0	17	0	0	1	0	25
Adrian Zaugg	South Africa	2006, 2009	0	17	1	0	3	0	60
Nikita Zlobin	Russia	2015	0	4	0	0	0	0	0
Andreas Zuber	Austria	2005	0	17 (16)	1	1	4	4	73

== By racing license ==
License	Total Drivers	Champions	Championships	First driver(s)	Last driver(s)
Argentina	2	0	0	Ricardo Risatti, Esteban Guerrieri (2007)	Esteban Guerrieri (2010)
Australia	3	0	0	Will Power (2005)	Daniel Ricciardo (2011)
Austria	3	0	0	Andreas Zuber (2005)	René Binder (2015)
Belgium	5	1 (Baguette)	1 (2009)	Frédéric Vervisch (2005)	Stoffel Vandoorne (2013)
Brazil	14	0	0	Fabio Carbone, Danilo Dirani, Carlos Iaconelli, Fernando Rees (2005)	Bruno Bonifacio, Pietro Fantin, André Negrão (2015)
Canada	3	1 (Wickens)	1 (2011)	Sean McIntosh (2006)	Nicholas Latifi (2015)
Colombia	3	0	0	Omar Leal (2009)	Óscar Tunjo (2014)
Czech Republic	3	0	0	Tomáš Kostka (2005)	Jan Charouz, Filip Salaquarda (2011)
Cyprus	1	0	0	Tio Ellinas (2015)	Tio Ellinas (2015)
Denmark	2	1 (Magnussen)	1 (2013)	Kevin Magnussen, Marco Sørensen (2012)	Marco Sørensen (2014)
Estonia	2	0	0	Sten Pentus (2008)	Kevin Korjus (2012)
Finland	2	0	0	Aaro Vainio (2012)	Matias Laine (2014)
France	27	0	0	Tristan Gommendy, Simon Pagenaud, Damien Pasini, Patrick Pilet, Nicolas Prost, Eric Salignon (2005)	Tom Dillmann, Aurélien Panis, Matthieu Vaxivière (2015)
Germany	10	0	0	Sven Barth, Daniel la Rosa, Markus Winkelhock (2005)	Daniel Abt (2012)
Hungary	1	0	0	Tamás Pál Kiss (2012)	Tamás Pál Kiss (2012)
India	1	0	0	Karun Chandhok (2005)	Karun Chandhok (2005)
Indonesia	2	0	0	Philo Paz Armand, Sean Gelael (2015)	Philo Paz Armand, Sean Gelael (2015)
Israel	1	0	0	Roy Nissany (2015)	Roy Nissany (2015)
Italy	24	0	0	Ivan Bellarosa, Raffaele Giammaria, Matteo Meneghello, Ferdinando Monfardini, Matteo Pellegrino, Stefano Proetto, Davide Rigon, Giovanni Tedeschi, Enrico Toccacelo (2005)	Luca Ghiotto, Andrea Roda (2014)
Japan	4	0	0	Ryo Fukuda (2005)	Yu Kanamaru (2015)
Latvia	1	0	0	Harald Schlegelmilch (2009)	Harald Schlegelmilch (2009)
Malaysia	2	0	0	Fairuz Fauzy (2007)	Jazeman Jaafar (2015)
Mexico	3	0	0	Salvador Durán (2007)	Alfonso Celis Jr. (2015)
Monaco	3	0	0	Clivio Piccione (2007)	Stéphane Richelmi (2011)
Morocco	1	0	0	Mehdi Bennani (2005)	Mehdi Bennani (2006)
Netherlands	10	2 (van der Garde, Frijns)	2 (2008, 2013)	Jaap van Lagen (2005)	Nyck de Vries, Meindert van Buuren, Beitske Visser (2015)
New Zealand	4	0	0	Chris van der Drift (2005)	Richie Stanaway (2014)
Philippines	1	0	0	Marlon Stöckinger (2013)	Marlon Stöckinger (2015)
Poland	1	1 (Kubica)	1 (2005)	Robert Kubica (2005)	Robert Kubica (2005)
Portugal	3	0	0	Álvaro Parente (2006)	António Félix da Costa (2013)
Romania	2	0	0	Michael Herck (2007)	Mihai Marinescu (2013)
Russia	8	1 (Aleshin)	1 (2010)	Mikhail Aleshin (2006)	Egor Orudzhev, Nikita Zlobin (2015)
San Marino	1	0	0	Christian Montanari (2005)	Christian Montanari (2006)
Serbia and Montenegro	1	0	0	Miloš Pavlović (2005)	Miloš Pavlović (2005)
Serbia	1	0	0	Miloš Pavlović (2006)	Miloš Pavlović (2007)
South Africa	3	0	0	Gavin Cronje, Adrian Zaugg (2006)	Cristiano Morgado, Adrian Zaugg (2009)
Spain	22	1 (Sainz Jr.)	1 (2014)	Celso Míguez, Félix Porteiro, Adrián Vallés (2005)	Roberto Merhi (2015)
Sweden	2	1 (Danielsson)	1 (2006)	Alx Danielsson (2005)	Gustav Malja (2015)
Switzerland	7	0	0	Giorgio Mondini (2005)	Louis Delétraz, Alex Fontana (2015)
Turkey	1	0	0	Jason Tahinciğlu (2006)	Jason Tahinciğlu (2006)
United Kingdom	28	1 (Rowland)	1 (2015)	Ben Hanley, Alex Lloyd, Ryan Sharp, Danny Watts (2005)	Will Bratt, Oliver Rowland, Dean Stoneman, Nick Yelloly (2015)
United States	4	0	0	Richard Antinucci, Colin Fleming (2005)	Jake Rosenzweig, Alexander Rossi (2012)
Venezuela	1	0	0	Pastor Maldonado (2005)	Pastor Maldonado (2006)
