= Zeta Corse =

Russian motor racing team

(Russia) Zeta Corse
- Founded: 2013
- Founder(s): Giancarlo Zampieri
- Folded: 2015
- Base: Valencia, Spain
- Team principal(s): Roman Novikov
- Former series: Formula Renault 3.5 Series
- Current drivers: TBA
- Website: http://www.zetacorse.ru/en/

Zeta Corse was a Russian motor racing team, who formerly operated in the Formula Renault 3.5 Series.

== History ==
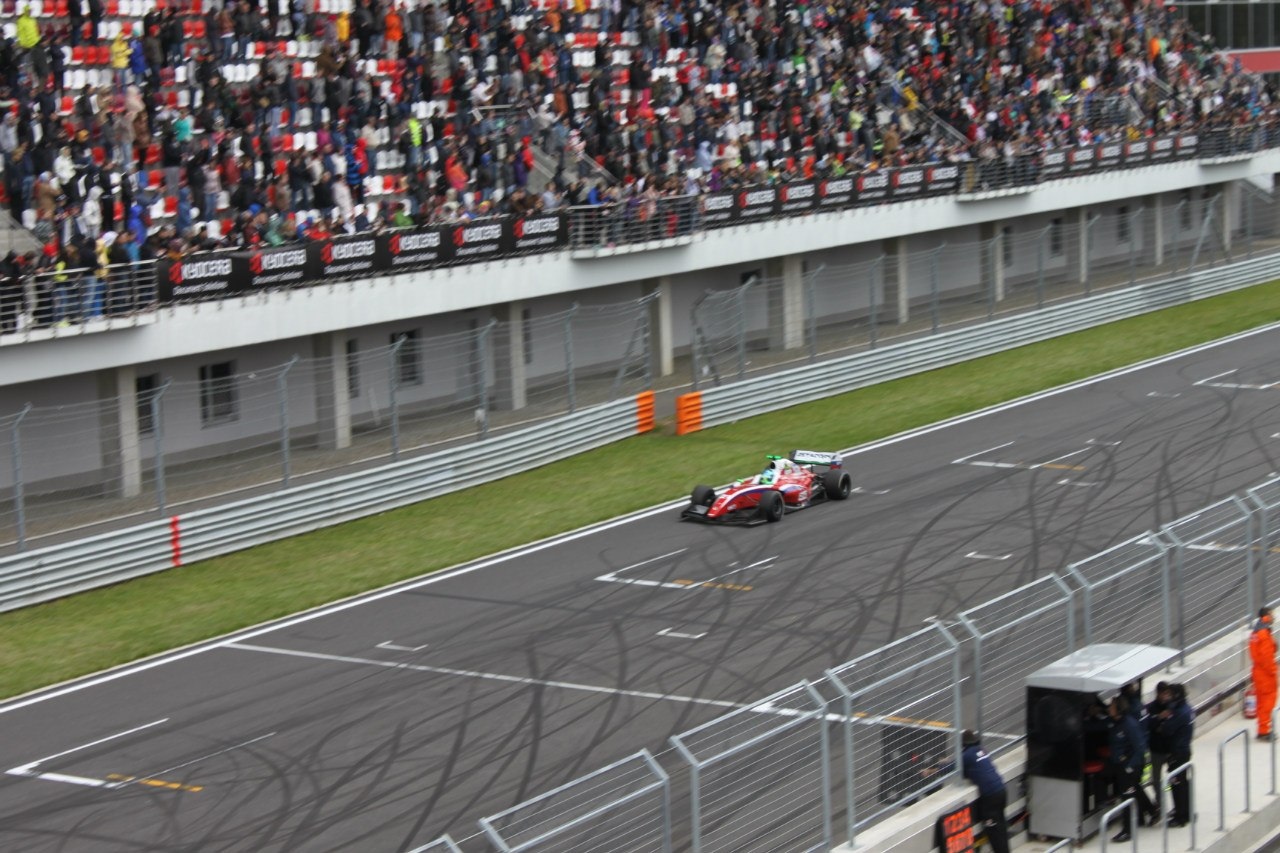
Roman Mavlanov during Race 1 of the 2014 Formula Renault 3.5 Series season at Moscow Raceway.

In January 2013, was announced that Giancarlo Zampieri (father of Daniel Zampieri) bought BVM - Target Racing Formula Renault 3.5 Series subdivision. The team was renamed to Zeta Corse, headed by Claudio Corradini and used personnel that previously worked with EPIC Racing and HRT F1 Team. The team headquarters was changed to Valencia.

For their first Formula Renault 3.5 Series round at Monza they signed Mihai Marinescu and Emmanuel Piget. But Piget raced just one round, in Alcañiz he was replaced by FIA Formula Two Championship runner-up Mathéo Tuscher. In Monaco the squad decided to completely change their line-up to Carlos Sainz Jr. and Nick Yelloly. Marinescu returned to the team for Spa and Moscow rounds, while Sainz was replaced by William Buller. At Spielberg Marinescu's seat was occupied by Riccardo Agostini, who handed back that seat to Sainz. On 14 December 2013 was revealed that the team was taken over by the Russian RMD Media company. The best achievement for Zeta Corse drivers in 2013 was three Buller's finishes in the top-five.

In 2014, the team had two full-time drivers after signing Roman Mavlanov and Roberto Merhi for their debut season in Formula Renault 3.5. Merhi started the season with the first podium for the team, finishing as runner-up to Will Stevens in the first race at Monza. On the home soil for the team at Moscow, Merhi took the first win for Zeta Corse. Merhi also achieved wins at Nürburgring and Hungaroring, finishing third in the drivers' standings and bringing the team the fourth in the teams' standings.

For 2015, the team decided to sign former GP2 Series driver Facu Regalia. However the Argentine driver since moved to Comtec Racing, and then to the Auto GP World Series, with Zeta Corse participating in no further races.

== Results ==
Year	Car	Drivers	Races	Wins	Poles	Fast laps	Points	D.C.	T.C.
2013	Dallara T12-Zytek	(United Kingdom) William Buller	10	0	0	0	46	11th	10th
2013	Dallara T12-Zytek	(Spain) Carlos Sainz Jr.	9	0	0	0	22	19th	10th
2013	Dallara T12-Zytek	(Romania) Mihai Marinescu	8	0	0	0	5	25th	10th
2013	Dallara T12-Zytek	(United Kingdom) Nick Yelloly	1	0	0	0	0	28th	10th
2013	Dallara T12-Zytek	(France) Emmanuel Piget	2	0	0	0	0	29th	10th
2013	Dallara T12-Zytek	(Switzerland) Mathéo Tuscher	2	0	0	0	0	30th	10th
2013	Dallara T12-Zytek	(Italy) Riccardo Agostini	2	0	0	0	0	NC	10th
2014	Dallara T12-Zytek	(Spain) Roberto Merhi	17	3	3	1	183	3rd	4th
2014	Dallara T12-Zytek	(Russia) Roman Mavlanov	15	0	0	0	0	24th	4th

In 2013 the team competed under Italian racing license, since 2014 the team racing under Russian racing license.
