= 2013 International GT Open =

Seasons
- ← 2012 2014 →

The 2013 International GT Open season was the eighth season of the International GT Open, the grand tourer-style sports car racing founded in 2006 by the Spanish GT Sport Organización. It began on 27 April at Le Castellet and finished on 10 November, at Barcelona after eight double-header meetings.

The season was won by Scuderia Villorba Corse driver Andrea Montermini, who raced on the Ferrari F458 GT Italia. He also won the Super GT standings. Giorgio Pantano, who raced behind the wheel of Bhai Tech Racing's McLaren MP4-12C GT3 won the GTS class.

== Entry list ==
On 23 April 2013, was released the provisional entry list for the first round at Paul Ricard.

2013 Entry List
Team	No.	Drivers	Car	Rounds
Super GT
(Austria) AT Racing	1	(Belarus) Alexander Talkanitsa Sr.	Ferrari 458 GT Italia	All
(Austria) AT Racing	1	(Belarus) Alexander Talkanitsa Jr.	Ferrari 458 GT Italia	All
(Italy) Scuderia Villorba Corse	3	(Italy) Andrea Montermini	Ferrari 458 GT Italia	All
(Italy) Scuderia Villorba Corse	3	(Italy) Luca Filippi	Ferrari 458 GT Italia	1–5
(Italy) Scuderia Villorba Corse	3	(Italy) Davide Rigon	Ferrari 458 GT Italia	6–7
(Italy) Scuderia Villorba Corse	3	(Italy) Niccolò Schirò	Ferrari 458 GT Italia	8
(Netherlands) V8 Racing	4	(Portugal) Miguel Ramos	Chevrolet Corvette C6.R	All
(Netherlands) V8 Racing	4	(Netherlands) Nicky Pastorelli	Chevrolet Corvette C6.R	All
(Netherlands) V8 Racing	7	(Netherlands) Diederik Sijthoff	Chevrolet Corvette C6.R	All
(Netherlands) V8 Racing	7	(Belgium) Bert Longin	Chevrolet Corvette C6.R	1, 3–8
(Netherlands) V8 Racing	8	(Netherlands) Wolf Nathan	Chevrolet Corvette C6.R	1–2, 6–8
(Netherlands) V8 Racing	8	(Netherlands) Rick Abresch	Chevrolet Corvette C6.R	1–2, 6–8
(Netherlands) V8 Racing	12	(Netherlands) Rick Abresch	Chevrolet Corvette C6.R	4
(Netherlands) V8 Racing	12	(Netherlands) Jacky Camp	Chevrolet Corvette C6.R	All
(Netherlands) V8 Racing	12	(Netherlands) Danny Werkman	Chevrolet Corvette C6.R	1–2, 5–7
(Netherlands) V8 Racing	12	(Netherlands) Jan Versluis	Chevrolet Corvette C6.R	3
(Netherlands) V8 Racing	12	(Netherlands) Francesco Pastorelli Jr.	Chevrolet Corvette C6.R	8
(Spain) Drivex	5	(United Kingdom) Archie Hamilton	Porsche 997 GT3 RSR (2012)	1–4
(Spain) Drivex	5	(Italy) Niccolò Schirò	Porsche 997 GT3 RSR (2012)	1–4
(Spain) Drivex	5	(Portugal) Carlos Vieira	Porsche 997 GT3 RSR (2012)	7–8
(Spain) Drivex	5	(Italy) Matteo Cressoni	Porsche 997 GT3 RSR (2012)	7
(Spain) Drivex	5	(Spain) Miguel Ángel de Castro	Porsche 997 GT3 RSR (2012)	8
(United Kingdom) MTech	10	(United Kingdom) Duncan Cameron	Ferrari 458 GT Italia	1
(United Kingdom) MTech	10	(Republic of Ireland) Matt Griffin	Ferrari 458 GT Italia	1
(Switzerland) Kessel Racing	11	(Poland) Michał Broniszewski	Ferrari 458 GT Italia	7–8
(Switzerland) Kessel Racing	11	(Austria) Philipp Peter	Ferrari 458 GT Italia	8
(Italy) AF Corse	15	(India) Vimal Mehta	Ferrari 458 GT Italia	7
(Italy) AF Corse	15	(Italy) Marco Cioci	Ferrari 458 GT Italia	7
(Italy) AF Corse	21	(United Kingdom) Duncan Cameron	Ferrari 458 GT Italia	2–8
(Italy) AF Corse	21	(Republic of Ireland) Matt Griffin	Ferrari 458 GT Italia	2–7
(Italy) AF Corse	21	(France) Emmanuel Collard	Ferrari 458 GT Italia	8
GTS
(Belgium) GPR Racing	13	(Belgium) Maxime Soulet	Aston Martin V12 Vantage GT3	1, 6–8
(Belgium) GPR Racing	13	(Belgium) Enzo Ide	Aston Martin V12 Vantage GT3	1, 6–7
(Belgium) GPR Racing	13	(Spain) Álvaro Barba	Aston Martin V12 Vantage GT3	8
(United Arab Emirates) Blue Jumeirah Team	18	(Spain) Rafael Unzurrunzaga	Mosler MT900R GT3	2, 8
(United Kingdom) Team LNT Ginetta	32	(United Kingdom) Mike Simpson	Ginetta G55 GT3	5
(United Kingdom) Team LNT Ginetta	32	(United Kingdom) Lawrence Tomlinson	Ginetta G55 GT3	5
(Switzerland) Kessel Racing	51	(Italy) Lorenzo Bontempelli	Ferrari 458 Italia GT3	All
(Switzerland) Kessel Racing	51	(Italy) Nicola de Marco	Ferrari 458 Italia GT3	1–5
(Switzerland) Kessel Racing	51	(Italy) Marco Frezza	Ferrari 458 Italia GT3	6–8
(Switzerland) Kessel Racing	52	(United States) Stephen Earle	Ferrari 458 Italia GT3	All
(Switzerland) Kessel Racing	52	(Germany) Freddy Kremer	Ferrari 458 Italia GT3	All
(Switzerland) Kessel Racing	53	(Denmark) Johnny Laursen	Ferrari 458 Italia GT3	1–2, 4–8
(Switzerland) Kessel Racing	53	(Denmark) Jan Magnussen	Ferrari 458 Italia GT3	1, 4–6, 8
(Switzerland) Kessel Racing	53	(Italy) Daniel Zampieri	Ferrari 458 Italia GT3	2
(Switzerland) Kessel Racing	53	(Brazil) César Ramos	Ferrari 458 Italia GT3	7
(Switzerland) Kessel Racing	68	(Switzerland) Thomas Flohr	Ferrari 458 Italia GT3	2, 4, 7
(Switzerland) Kessel Racing	68	(Italy) Francesco Castellacci	Ferrari 458 Italia GT3	2, 4, 7
(Switzerland) Kessel Racing	71	(Switzerland) Alan Calari	Ferrari 458 Italia GT3	3–4, 6
(Switzerland) Kessel Racing	71	(Switzerland) Gabriele Gardel	Ferrari 458 Italia GT3	3
(Switzerland) Kessel Racing	71	(Italy) Daniel Zampieri	Ferrari 458 Italia GT3	4, 6
(Switzerland) Kessel Racing	77	(Italy) Marco Zanuttini	Ferrari 458 Italia GT3	1–2
(Switzerland) Kessel Racing	77	(Italy) Stefano Gattuso	Ferrari 458 Italia GT3	1–2
(Italy) AF Corse	54	(Germany) Claudio Sdanewitsch	Ferrari 458 Italia GT3	1–5, 7–8
(Italy) AF Corse	54	(Italy) Michele Rugolo	Ferrari 458 Italia GT3	1–5, 7
(Italy) AF Corse	54	(Italy) Federico Leo	Ferrari 458 Italia GT3	8
(Italy) AF Corse	55	(Italy) Matteo Beretta	Ferrari 458 Italia GT3	All
(Italy) AF Corse	55	(United Kingdom) Michael Lyons	Ferrari 458 Italia GT3	All
(Italy) AF Corse	56	(Italy) Fabio Onidi	Ferrari 458 Italia GT3	7–8
(Italy) AF Corse	56	(Czech Republic) Filip Salaquarda	Ferrari 458 Italia GT3	7–8
(Italy) Autorlando Sport	57	(Spain) Isaac Tutumlu	Porsche 997 GT3-R (2013)	All
(Italy) Autorlando Sport	57	(Greece) Dimitris Deverikos	Porsche 997 GT3-R (2013)	1–4, 6–8
(Italy) Autorlando Sport	57	(Italy) Antonio Spavone	Porsche 997 GT3-R (2013)	5
(Italy) Autorlando Sport	58	(Venezuela) Emilio Di Guida	Porsche 997 GT3-R	3–5
(Italy) Autorlando Sport	58	(Netherlands) Jeroen Bleekemolen	Porsche 997 GT3-R	3–5
(Italy) Autorlando Sport	58	(Italy) Maurizio Fratti	Porsche 997 GT3-R	6
(Italy) Autorlando Sport	58	(Italy) Giuseppe Ghezzi	Porsche 997 GT3-R	6
(Italy) Ombra	59	(Germany) Mario Cordoni	Ferrari 458 Italia GT3	1–3, 5, 7
(Italy) Ombra	59	(Switzerland) Joel Camathias	Ferrari 458 Italia GT3	1–3, 5, 7
(Italy) Ombra	60	(Switzerland) Joel Camathias	Ferrari 458 Italia GT3	4, 6
(Italy) Ombra	60	(Italy) Stefano Costantini	Ferrari 458 Italia GT3	All
(Italy) Ombra	60	(United Kingdom) Jack Clarke	Ferrari 458 Italia GT3	1
(Italy) Ombra	60	(Spain) Álvaro Barba	Ferrari 458 Italia GT3	2–3, 5
(Italy) Ombra	60	(Italy) Stefano Gattuso	Ferrari 458 Italia GT3	7
(Italy) Ombra	60	(Italy) Kevin Ceccon	Ferrari 458 Italia GT3	8
(Germany) Seyffarth Motorsport	61	(Spain) Miguel Toril	Mercedes-Benz SLS AMG GT3	All
(Germany) Seyffarth Motorsport	61	(Netherlands) Renger van der Zande	Mercedes-Benz SLS AMG GT3	1, 4–6
(Germany) Seyffarth Motorsport	61	(Germany) Jan Seyffarth	Mercedes-Benz SLS AMG GT3	2–3, 7–8
(Germany) Seyffarth Motorsport	62	(Germany) Jan Seyffarth	Mercedes-Benz SLS AMG GT3	6
(Germany) Seyffarth Motorsport	62	(Germany) Max Völker	Mercedes-Benz SLS AMG GT3	5–6
(Germany) Seyffarth Motorsport	62	(Germany) Kenneth Heyer	Mercedes-Benz SLS AMG GT3	5
(Russia) SMP Racing Russian Bears	63	(Spain) Pol Rosell	Ferrari 458 Italia GT3	All
(Russia) SMP Racing Russian Bears	63	(Russia) Roman Mavlanov	Ferrari 458 Italia GT3	All
(Russia) SMP Racing Russian Bears	64	(Russia) Viacheslav Maleev	Ferrari 458 Italia GT3	All
(Russia) SMP Racing Russian Bears	64	(Russia) Kirill Ladygin	Ferrari 458 Italia GT3	All
(Italy) Bhai Tech Racing	65	(Italy) Giorgio Pantano	McLaren MP4-12C GT3	All
(Italy) Bhai Tech Racing	65	(Brazil) Rafael Suzuki	McLaren MP4-12C GT3	1–7
(Italy) Bhai Tech Racing	65	(Portugal) Álvaro Parente	McLaren MP4-12C GT3	8
(Italy) Bhai Tech Racing	66	(New Zealand) Chris van der Drift	McLaren MP4-12C GT3	All
(Italy) Bhai Tech Racing	66	(Brazil) Luiz Razia	McLaren MP4-12C GT3	All
(Russia) / Estamotorsports; (Russia) / ESTA Motorsport	67	(Russia) Aleksey Basov	Ferrari 458 Italia GT3	2
(Russia) / Estamotorsports; (Russia) / ESTA Motorsport	67	(Italy) Alessandro Pier Guidi	Ferrari 458 Italia GT3	2, 4, 7
(Russia) / Estamotorsports; (Russia) / ESTA Motorsport	67	(Russia) Aleksandr Skryabin	Ferrari 458 Italia GT3	4, 7
(Germany) Rinaldi Racing	69	(Russia) Vadim Kogay	Porsche 997 GT3-R	2–3, 5–7
(Germany) Rinaldi Racing	69	(Germany) Marco Seefried	Porsche 997 GT3-R	2–3, 5–7
(Austria) Lechner Racing Team	70	(Austria) Mario Plachutta	Mercedes-Benz SLS AMG GT3	5, 8
(Austria) Lechner Racing Team	70	(Austria) Walter Lechner	Mercedes-Benz SLS AMG GT3	5, 8
(Netherlands) V8 Racing	72	(Switzerland) Brian Lavio	Chevrolet Corvette Z06.R GT3	3–4
(Netherlands) V8 Racing	72	(United States) Brian Wong	Chevrolet Corvette Z06.R GT3	3
(Netherlands) V8 Racing	72	(Netherlands) Dennis Retera	Chevrolet Corvette Z06.R GT3	4
(United Kingdom) Balfe Motorsport	73	(United Kingdom) Shaun Balfe	Ferrari 458 Italia GT3	5, 8
(United Kingdom) Balfe Motorsport	73	(United Kingdom) James Swift	Ferrari 458 Italia GT3	5, 8
(Germany) Team Rhino's Leipert Motorsport	74	(Germany) Fabian Hamprecht	Lamborghini Gallardo GT3	5–8
(Germany) Team Rhino's Leipert Motorsport	74	(Netherlands) Peter Kox	Lamborghini Gallardo GT3	5–8
(Germany) Team Rhino's Leipert Motorsport	75	(Germany) Eduard Leganov	Lamborghini Gallardo GT3	6–7
(Germany) Team Rhino's Leipert Motorsport	75	(Slovakia) Štefan Rosina	Lamborghini Gallardo GT3	6–7
(Germany) Attempto Racing	79	(Germany) Tim Müller	Porsche 997 GT3-R	6
(Germany) Attempto Racing	79	(Germany) Dirg Parhofer	Porsche 997 GT3-R	6
(Portugal) Team Novadriver	80	(Portugal) Lourenço da Veiga	Audi R8 LMS ultra	2, 4, 8
(Portugal) Team Novadriver	80	(Portugal) Manuel Gião	Audi R8 LMS ultra	2, 4, 8
(Portugal) Team Novadriver	81	(Portugal) César Campaniço	Audi R8 LMS ultra	2, 4, 8
(Portugal) Team Novadriver	81	(Portugal) Carlos Vieira	Audi R8 LMS ultra	2
(Portugal) Team Novadriver	81	(Portugal) Joao Figueiredo	Audi R8 LMS ultra	4
(Portugal) Team Novadriver	81	(Brazil) Rafael Suzuki	Audi R8 LMS ultra	8
(Spain) Luis Villalba	82	(Spain) Luis Villalba	Ginetta G50	2, 4
(Spain) Luis Villalba	82	(Spain) Francesc Gutiérrez	Ginetta G50	2, 4
(Portugal) Sports and You	83	(Portugal) José Pedro Fontes	Mercedes-Benz SLS AMG GT3	6, 8
(Portugal) Sports and You	83	(Portugal) João Silva	Mercedes-Benz SLS AMG GT3	6
(Portugal) Sports and You	83	(Portugal) Miguel Barbosa	Mercedes-Benz SLS AMG GT3	8
(Portugal) Sports and You	84	(Portugal) António Coimbra	Mercedes-Benz SLS AMG GT3	6–7
(Portugal) Sports and You	84	(Portugal) Luis Silva	Mercedes-Benz SLS AMG GT3	6–7
(France) Ruffier Racing	86	(France) Patrice Lafargue	Porsche 997 GT3-R (2012)	8
(France) Ruffier Racing	86	(France) Paul Lafargue	Porsche 997 GT3-R (2012)	8
(France) Ruffier Racing	87	(France) Georges Cabanne	Porsche 997 GT3-R (2013)	8
(France) Ruffier Racing	87	(France) Grégory Guilvert	Porsche 997 GT3-R (2013)	8
(Belgium) Belgian Audi Club Team WRT	88	(Belgium) Yves Weerts	Audi R8 LMS ultra	8
(Belgium) Belgian Audi Club Team WRT	88	(Portugal) Filipe Albuquerque	Audi R8 LMS ultra	8
(France) Team Sofrev ASP	89	(France) Maurice Ricci	Ferrari 458 Italia GT3	8
(France) Team Sofrev ASP	89	(France) Morgan Moullin Traffort	Ferrari 458 Italia GT3	8
(France) Team Sofrev ASP	90	(France) Gabriel Balthazard	Ferrari 458 Italia GT3	8
(France) Team Sofrev ASP	90	(France) Jérôme Policand	Ferrari 458 Italia GT3	8
(France) PRO GT by Philippe Alméras	91	(France) Eric Dermont	Porsche 997 GT3-R (2013)	8
(France) PRO GT by Philippe Alméras	91	(France) Franck Perera	Porsche 997 GT3-R (2013)	8
Team Ukraine	99	(Ukraine) Andrii Kruglyk	Ferrari 458 Italia GT3	1
Team Ukraine	99	(Ukraine) Ruslan Tsyplakov	Ferrari 458 Italia GT3	1

== Race calendar and results ==
Round		Circuit	Date	SGT Winner	GTS Winner
1	R1	(France) Circuit Paul Ricard	27 April	No. 7 V8 Racing	No. 13 GPR Racing
1	R1	(France) Circuit Paul Ricard	27 April	(Netherlands) Diederik Sijthoff (Belgium) Bert Longin	(Belgium) Maxime Soulet (Belgium) Enzo Ide
1	R2	(France) Circuit Paul Ricard	28 April	No. 3 Scuderia Villorba Corse	No. 13 GPR Racing
1	R2	(France) Circuit Paul Ricard	28 April	(Italy) Andrea Montermini (Italy) Luca Filippi	(Belgium) Maxime Soulet (Belgium) Enzo Ide
2	R1	(Portugal) Autódromo Internacional do Algarve, Portimão	11 May	No. 4 V8 Racing	No. 67 Estamotorsports
2	R1	(Portugal) Autódromo Internacional do Algarve, Portimão	11 May	(Portugal) Miguel Ramos (Netherlands) Nicky Pastorelli	(Russia) Aleksey Basov (Italy) Alessandro Pier Guidi
2	R2	(Portugal) Autódromo Internacional do Algarve, Portimão	12 May	No. 21 AF Corse	No. 63 SMP Racing Russian Bears
2	R2	(Portugal) Autódromo Internacional do Algarve, Portimão	12 May	(United Kingdom) Duncan Cameron (Republic of Ireland) Matt Griffin	(Spain) Pol Rosell (Russia) Roman Mavlanov
3	R1	(Germany) Nürburgring	1 June	No. 3 Scuderia Villorba Corse	No. 66 Bhai Tech Racing
3	R1	(Germany) Nürburgring	1 June	(Italy) Andrea Montermini (Italy) Luca Filippi	(Brazil) Luiz Razia (New Zealand) Chris van der Drift
3	R2	(Germany) Nürburgring	2 June	No. 21 AF Corse	No. 65 Bhai Tech Racing
3	R2	(Germany) Nürburgring	2 June	(United Kingdom) Duncan Cameron (Republic of Ireland) Matt Griffin	(Brazil) Rafael Suzuki (Italy) Giorgio Pantano
4	R1	(Spain) Circuito de Jerez	15 June	No. 4 V8 Racing	No. 57 Autorlando Sport
4	R1	(Spain) Circuito de Jerez	15 June	(Portugal) Miguel Ramos (Netherlands) Nicky Pastorelli	(Spain) Isaac Tutumlu (Greece) Dimitris Deverikos
4	R2	(Spain) Circuito de Jerez	16 June	No. 3 Scuderia Villorba Corse	No. 61 Seyffarth Motorsport
4	R2	(Spain) Circuito de Jerez	16 June	(Italy) Andrea Montermini (Italy) Luca Filippi	(Spain) Miguel Toril (Netherlands) Renger van der Zande
5	R1	(United Kingdom) Silverstone Circuit	13 July	No. 4 V8 Racing	No. 65 Bhai Tech Racing
5	R1	(United Kingdom) Silverstone Circuit	13 July	(Portugal) Miguel Ramos (Netherlands) Nicky Pastorelli	(Brazil) Rafael Suzuki (Italy) Giorgio Pantano
5	R2	(United Kingdom) Silverstone Circuit	14 July	No. 21 AF Corse	No. 61 Seyffarth Motorsport
5	R2	(United Kingdom) Silverstone Circuit	14 July	(United Kingdom) Duncan Cameron (Republic of Ireland) Matt Griffin	(Spain) Miguel Toril (Netherlands) Renger van der Zande
6	R1	(Belgium) Circuit de Spa-Francorchamps	7 September	No. 4 V8 Racing	No. 51 Kessel Racing
6	R1	(Belgium) Circuit de Spa-Francorchamps	7 September	(Portugal) Miguel Ramos (Netherlands) Nicky Pastorelli	(Italy) Lorenzo Bontempelli (Italy) Marco Frezza
6	R2	(Belgium) Circuit de Spa-Francorchamps	8 September	No. 3 Scuderia Villorba Corse	No. 74 Team Rhino's Leipert Motorsport
6	R2	(Belgium) Circuit de Spa-Francorchamps	8 September	(Italy) Andrea Montermini (Italy) Davide Rigon	(Germany) Fabian Hamprecht (Netherlands) Peter Kox
7	R1	(Italy) Monza Circuit	5 October	No. 3 Scuderia Villorba Corse	No. 65 Bhai Tech Racing
7	R1	(Italy) Monza Circuit	5 October	(Italy) Andrea Montermini (Italy) Davide Rigon	(Brazil) Rafael Suzuki (Italy) Giorgio Pantano
7	R2	(Italy) Monza Circuit	6 October	No. 7 V8 Racing	No. 63 SMP Racing Russian Bears
7	R2	(Italy) Monza Circuit	6 October	(Netherlands) Diederik Sijthoff (Belgium) Bert Longin	(Spain) Pol Rosell (Russia) Roman Mavlanov
8	R1	(Spain) Circuit de Catalunya	9 November	No. 11 Kessel Racing	No. 13 GPR Racing
8	R1	(Spain) Circuit de Catalunya	9 November	(Poland) Michał Broniszewski (Austria) Philipp Peter	(Belgium) Maxime Soulet (Belgium) Álvaro Barba
8	R2	(Spain) Circuit de Catalunya	10 November	No. 12 V8 Racing	No. 63 SMP Racing Russian Bears
8	R2	(Spain) Circuit de Catalunya	10 November	(Netherlands) Jacky Camp (Netherlands) Francesco Pastorelli Jr.	(Spain) Pol Rosell (Russia) Roman Mavlanov

== Championship standings ==
Scoring system

Position	1st	2nd	3rd	4th	5th
Points	10	8	6	4	3

=== Drivers' Championship ===
==== Super GT ====
Pos	Driver	LEC (France)		ALG (Portugal)		NÜR (Germany)		JER (Spain)		SIL (United Kingdom)		SPA (Belgium)		MNZ (Italy)		CAT (Spain)		Total
1	(Italy) Andrea Montermini	3	1	2	3	1	3	2	1	2	2	14	1	5	12	Ret	11	116
2	(Netherlands) Nicky Pastorelli (Portugal) Miguel Ramos	13	Ret	1	2	3	2	1	6	1	23	3	4	10	13	14	13	94
3	(United Kingdom) Duncan Cameron	5	8	DNS	1	6	1	DNS	DNS	4	1	4	11	11	10	Ret	7	82
4	(Italy) Luca Filippi	3	1	2	WD	1	3	2	1	2	2							78
5	(Republic of Ireland) Matt Griffin	5	8	DNS	1	6	1	DNS	DNS	4	1	4	11	11	10			74
6	(Belarus) Alexander Talkanitsa Sr. (Belarus) Alexander Talkanitsa Jr.	7	3	5	6	21	8	9	4	21	17	6	10	6	20	11	21	71
7	(Netherlands) Diederik Sijthoff	7	5	14	Ret	2	15	6	5	3	3	9	Ret	Ret	8	Ret	28	60
8	(Belgium) Bert Longin	7	5			2	15	6	5	3	3	9	Ret	Ret	8	Ret	28	56
9	(Netherlands) Jacky Camp	19	21	18	19	18	10	Ret	DNS	11	18	12	15	21	Ret	14	1	32
10	(Italy) Davide Rigon											14	1	5	12			26
11	(United Kingdom) Archie Hamilton (Italy) Niccolò Schirò	11	10	DNS	7	Ret	5	3	DNS							Ret	11	25
13	(Netherlands) Danny Werkman	19	21	18	19					11	18	12	15	21	Ret			15
14	(Poland) Michał Broniszewski													18	16	1	Ret	13
15	(Austria) Philipp Peter															1	Ret	10
16	(Netherlands) Rick Abresch	20	20	19	DNS			Ret	DNS			21	Ret	19	21	22	Ret	3
17	(Netherlands) Wolf Nathan	20	20	19	DNS							21	Ret	9	21	22	Ret	3
18	(Italy) Marco Cioci (India) Vimal Mehta													14	18			3
19	(Netherlands) Jan Versluis					18	10											3
Guest drivers ineligible to score points
	(Netherlands) Francesco Pastorelli Jr.															14	1	
	(France) Emmanuel Collard															Ret	7	
	(Portugal) Carlos Vieira													30	22	Ret	Ret	
	(Italy) Matteo Cressoni													30	22			
	(Spain) Miguel Ángel de Castro															Ret	Ret	
Pos	Driver	LEC (France)		ALG (Portugal)		NÜR (Germany)		JER (Spain)		SIL (United Kingdom)		SPA (Belgium)		MNZ (Italy)		CAT (Spain)		Total

Colour	Result
Gold	Winner
Silver	Second place
Bronze	Third place
Green	Points classification
Blue	Non-points classification
Blue	Non-classified finish (NC)
Purple	Retired, not classified (Ret)
Red	Did not qualify (DNQ)
Red	Did not pre-qualify (DNPQ)
Black	Disqualified (DSQ)
White	Did not start (DNS)
White	Withdrew (WD)
White	Race cancelled (C)
Blank	Did not practice (DNP)
Blank	Did not arrive (DNA)
Blank	Excluded (EX)

==== GTS ====
Pos	Driver	LEC (France)		ALG (Portugal)		NÜR (Germany)		JER (Spain)		SIL (United Kingdom)		SPA (Belgium)		MNZ (Italy)		CAT (Spain)		Total
1	(Italy) Giorgio Pantano	22	DNS	10	11	6	4	19	8	5	7	20	9	1	7	9	3	56
2	(Italy) Lorenzo Bontempelli	Ret	6	11	10	8	7	8	18	14	8	1	6	9	3	3	18	56
3	(Brazil) Rafael Suzuki	22	DNS	10	11	6	4	19	8	5	7	20	9	1	7	4	17	54
4	(Russia) Roman Mavlanov (Spain) Pol Rosell	17	DNS	9	4	14	9	14	11	10	6	Ret	14	4	1	16	2	47
5	(Belgium) Maxime Soulet	1	2									5	3	24	25	2	10	44
6	(Italy) Matteo Beretta (United Kingdom) Michael Lyons	4	16	Ret	5	13	Ret	10	9	6	11	7	7	29	6	5	8	44
7	(Spain) Miguel Toril	12	4	6	14	9	17	Ret	1	Ret	4	10	13	16	15	Ret	9	39
8	(Brazil) Luiz Razia (New Zealand) Chris van der Drift	Ret	15	13	9	5	6	20	22	9	Ret	Ret	Ret	2	Ret	10	5	37
9	(Belgium) Enzo Ide	1	2									5	3	24	25			34
10	(Spain) Isaac Tutumlu	21	11	7	8	16	19	4	Ret	Ret	10	2	8	Ret	9	8	15	30
11	(Greece) Dimitris Deverikos	21	11	7	8	16	19	4	Ret			2	8	Ret	9	8	15	30
12	(Netherlands) Renger van der Zande	12	4					Ret	1	Ret	4	10	13					28
13	(Italy) Marco Frezza											1	6	9	3	3	18	28
14	(Italy) Stefano Costantini	8	12	8	12	10	Ret	7	10	Ret	Ret	8	5	20	24	17	16	28
15	(Italy) Nicola de Marco	Ret	6	11	10	8	7	8	18	14	8							28
16	(Denmark) Johnny Laursen	2	9	Ret	15			12	12	7	13	15	Ret	7	5	13	19	26
17	(Italy) Alessandro Pier Guidi			4	18			13	14					3	2			24
18	(Switzerland) Joël Camathias	14	13	21	17	11	14	7	10	20	Ret	8	5	8	Ret	DNS	DNS	20
19	(Denmark) Jan Magnussen	2	9					12	12	7	13	15	Ret			13	19	20
20	(Germany) Fabian Hamprecht (Netherlands) Peter Kox									Ret	5	11	2	13	19	7	Ret	18
21	(Netherlands) Jeroen Bleekemolen (Venezuela) Emilio Di Guida					7	13	17	7	8	9							18
22	(Spain) Alvaro Barba			8	12	10	Ret			Ret	Ret					2	10	14
23	(Russia) Alexandr Skryabin							13	14					3	2			14
24	(Italy) Fabio Onidi (Czech Republic) Filip Salaquarda													26	4	6	4	13
25	(Germany) Jan Seyffarth			6	14	9	17					13	16	16	15	Ret	9	11
26	(Russia) Aleksey Basov			4	18													10
27	(Brazil) César Ramos													7	5			6
28	(Russia) Kirill Ladygin (Russia) Viacheslav Maleev	10	7	15	13	12	20	15	21	16	14	Ret	17	25	11	12	Ret	4
29	(United Kingdom) Jack Clarke	8	12															4
30	(United States) Brian Wong					15	11											3
30	(Switzerland) Brian Lavio					15	11	Ret	DNS									3
31	(Italy) Stefano Gattuso	9	14	12	16									20	24			3
32	(Italy) Marco Zanuttini	9	14	12	16													3
	(Germany) Mario Cordoni	14	13	21	17	11	14			20	Ret			8	Ret	DNS	DNS	0
	(Italy) Antonio Spavone									Ret	10							0
	(Russia) Vadim Kogay (Germany) Marco Seefried			Ret	DNS	20	12			12	14	Ret	Ret	22	14			0
	(Germany) Claudio Sdanewitsch	15	19	20	21	17	16	Ret	16	17	19			12	Ret	19	Ret	0
	(Italy) Michele Rugolo	15	19	20	21	17	16	Ret	16	17	19			12	Ret			0
	(United States) Stephen Earle (Germany) Freddy Kremer	16	20	17	18	19	18	22	20	19	20	17	12	15	17	27	25	0
	(Germany) Max Völker									Ret	22	13	16					0
	(Austria) Walter Lechner (Austria) Mario Plachutta									13	16					23	26	0
	(United Kingdom) Shaun Balfe (United Kingdom) James Swift									18	14					25	Ret	0
	(Italy) Francesco Castellacci (Switzerland) Thomas Flohr			Ret	DNS			16	15					17	DNS			0
	(Italy) Daniel Zampieri			Ret	15			21	17			Ret	Ret					0
	(United Kingdom) Mike Simpson (United Kingdom) Lawrence Tomlinson									15	21							0
	(Ukraine) Andrii Kruglyk (Ukraine) Ruslan Tsyplakov	18	17															0
	(Switzerland) Alan Calari					Ret	21	21	17			Ret	Ret					0
	(Italy) Maurizio Fratti (Italy) Giuseppe Ghezzi											18	19					0
	(Germany) Tim Müller (Germany) Dirg Parhofer											19	20					0
	(Switzerland) Gabriele Gardel					Ret	21											0
	(Germany) Kenneth Heyer									Ret	22							0
	(Germany) Eduard Leganov (Slovakia) Štefan Rosina											Ret	Ret	27	DNS			0
	(Spain) Rafael Unzurrunzaga			Ret	DNS											Ret	DNS	0
	(Netherlands) Dennis Retera							Ret	DNS									0
Drivers ineligible for championship points
	(Portugal) César Campaniço			3	Ret			5	13							4	17	
	(Portugal) Carlos Vieira			3	Ret													
	(Portugal) Álvaro Parente															9	3	
	(Portugal) Lourenço da Veiga (Portugal) Manuel Gião			16	23			11	3							15	27	
	(Portugal) João Figueiredo							5	13									
	(France) Eric Dermont (France) Franck Perera															Ret	6	
	(France) Gabriel Balthazard (France) Jérôme Policand															21	12	
	(France) Morgan Moullin Traffort (France) Maurice Ricci															20	14	
	(Portugal) José Pedro Fontes											16	17			24	24	
	(Portugal) João Silva											16	17					
	(Italy) Kevin Ceccon															17	16	
	(Spain) Francesc Gutiérrez (Spain) Luis Villalba			Ret	22			18	19									
	(Italy) Federico Leo															19	Ret	
	(France) Georges Cabanne (France) Grégory Guilvert															26	20	
	(Portugal) António Coimbra (Portugal) Luis Silva											Ret	21	23	23			
	(Portugal) Filipe Albuquerque (Belgium) Yves Weerts															28	22	
	(France) Patrice Lafargue (France) Paul Lafargue															Ret	23	
	(Portugal) Miguel Barbosa															24	24	
Pos	Driver	LEC (France)		ALG (Portugal)		NÜR (Germany)		JER (Spain)		SIL (United Kingdom)		SPA (Belgium)		MNZ (Italy)		CAT (Spain)		Total

Colour	Result
Gold	Winner
Silver	Second place
Bronze	Third place
Green	Points classification
Blue	Non-points classification
Blue	Non-classified finish (NC)
Purple	Retired, not classified (Ret)
Red	Did not qualify (DNQ)
Red	Did not pre-qualify (DNPQ)
Black	Disqualified (DSQ)
White	Did not start (DNS)
White	Withdrew (WD)
White	Race cancelled (C)
Blank	Did not practice (DNP)
Blank	Did not arrive (DNA)
Blank	Excluded (EX)

=== Teams' Championship ===
==== Super GT ====
Pos	Team	Points
1	(Netherlands) V8 Racing	183
2	(Italy) Scuderia Villorba Corse	116
3	(Italy) AF Corse	73
4	(Austria) AT Racing	71
5	(Spain) Drivex	19
6	(Switzerland) Kessel Racing	13
7	(United Kingdom) MTech	12

==== GTS ====
Pos	Team	Points
1	(Italy) Bhai Tech Racing	93
2	(Switzerland) Kessel Racing	85
3	(Italy) AF Corse	57
4	(Russia) SMP Racing Russian Bears	51
5	(Italy) Autorlando Sport	48
6	(Belgium) GPR Racing	44
7	(Germany) Seyffarth Motorsport	39
8	(Italy) Ombra	28
9	(Germany) Team Rhino's Leipert Motorsport	18
10	(Russia) ESTA Motorsport	14
11	(Russia) Estamotorsports	10
12	(Portugal) Team Novadriver	6
13	(Netherlands) V8 Racing	3

=== Manufacturers' Championship ===
==== Super GT ====
Pos	Team	Points
1	(Italy) Ferrari	249
2	(United States) Chevrolet	174
3	(Germany) Porsche	19

==== GTS ====
Pos	Team	Points
1	(Italy) Ferrari	194
2	(United Kingdom) McLaren	93
3	(Germany) Porsche	48
4	(United Kingdom) Aston Martin	44
5	(Germany) Mercedes-Benz	39
6	(Italy) Lamborghini	18
7	(Germany) Audi	6
8	(United States) Chevrolet	3
