= 2013 Formula Renault 3.5 Series =

Seasons
- ← 2012 2014 →

The 2013 Formula Renault 3.5 Series season was a multi-event motor racing championship for open wheel, formula racing cars held across Europe. The championship features drivers competing in 3.5 litre Formula Renault single seat race cars that conform to the technical regulations for the championship. The 2013 season was the ninth Formula Renault 3.5 Series season organized by the Renault Sport. The season began at Monza Circuit on 6 April and finished on 20 October at Circuit de Barcelona-Catalunya. The series formed part of the World Series by Renault meetings at seven double header events with double header event at Monza and single event at Monaco.

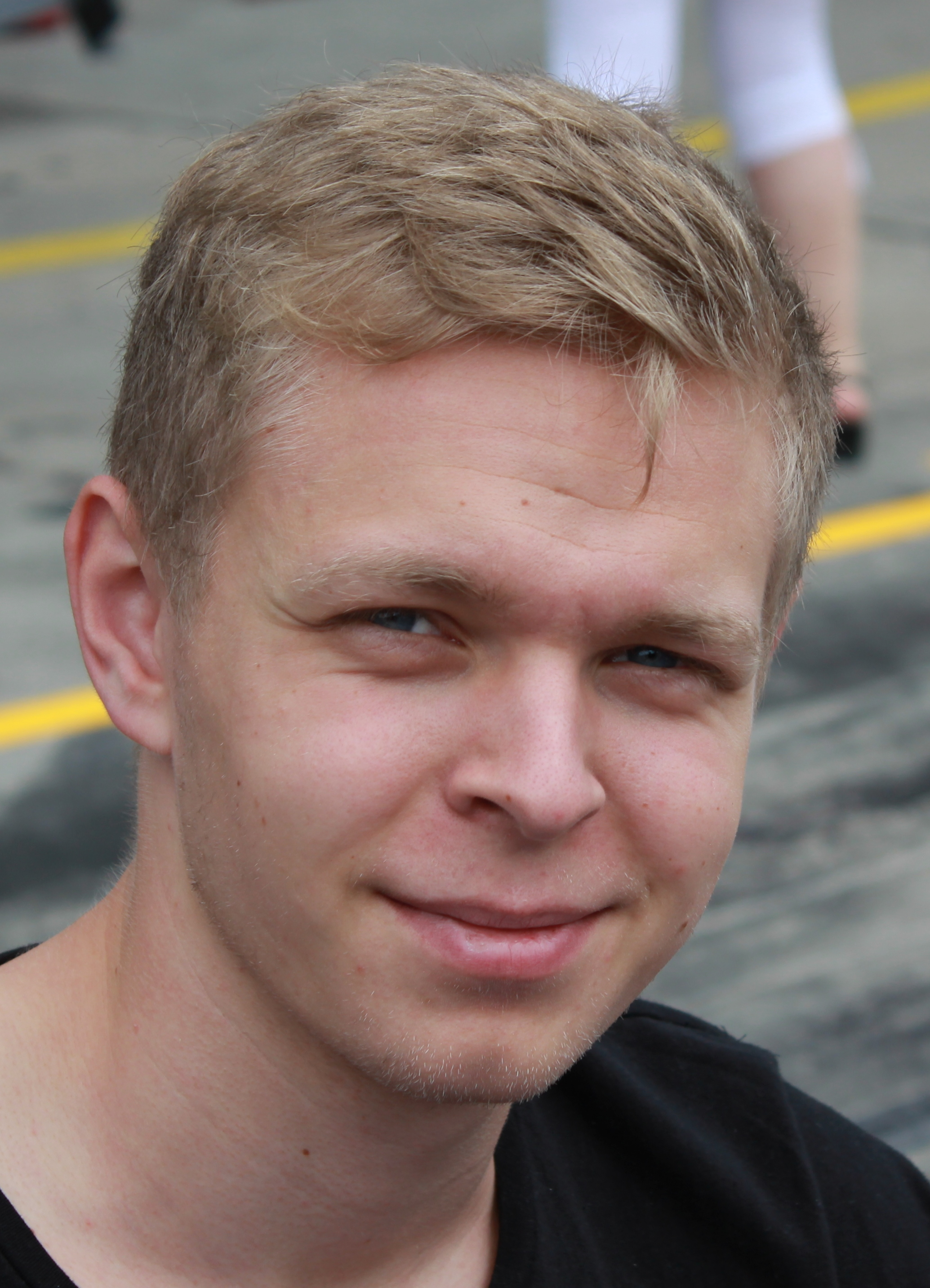
Kevin Magnussen (pictured in 2012), won the Drivers championship.

The championship battle was between McLaren junior programme drivers Kevin Magnussen and Stoffel Vandoorne. Magnussen clinched the championship title with a race to spare, and ultimately finished sixty points ahead of Vandoorne. Despite having less wins than in 2012, António Félix da Costa improved to the third place in the drivers' standings. Nico Müller, Marco Sørensen and Carlos Huertas were the only other winners outside the top three.

== Teams and drivers ==
| Team | No. | Driver name | Status | Rounds |
|---|---|---|---|---|
| (France) Tech 1 Racing | 1 | (Russia) Mikhail Aleshin | | All |
| (France) Tech 1 Racing | 2 | (Netherlands) Nigel Melker | | All |
| (United Kingdom) Arden Caterham | 3 | (Portugal) António Félix da Costa | | All |
| (United Kingdom) Arden Caterham | 4 | (Brazil) Pietro Fantin | R | All |
| (United Kingdom) Fortec Motorsports | 5 | (Belgium) Stoffel Vandoorne | R | All |
| (United Kingdom) Fortec Motorsports | 6 | (United Kingdom) Oliver Webb | | All |
| (Czech Republic) ISR | 7 | (Russia) Sergey Sirotkin | R | All |
| (Czech Republic) ISR | 8 | (Switzerland) Christopher Zanella | R | All |
| (Czech Republic) Lotus | 9 | (Denmark) Marco Sørensen | | All |
| (Czech Republic) Lotus | 10 | (Philippines) Marlon Stöckinger | R | All |
| (United Kingdom) Carlin | 11 | (Colombia) Carlos Huertas | | All |
| (United Kingdom) Carlin | 12 | (Malaysia) Jazeman Jaafar | R | All |
| (United Kingdom) SMP Racing by Comtec | 15 | (Russia) Daniil Move | | All |
| (United Kingdom) SMP Racing by Comtec | 16 | (Brazil) Lucas Foresti | | All |
| (Italy) International Draco Racing | 17 | (Brazil) André Negrão | | All |
| (Italy) International Draco Racing | 18 | (Switzerland) Nico Müller | | All |
| (France) DAMS | 19 | (France) Norman Nato | R | All |
| (France) DAMS | 20 | (Denmark) Kevin Magnussen | | All |
| (United Kingdom) / P1 Motorsport; (United Kingdom) / P1 by Strakka Racing (Note: The team competed as P1 Motorsport for the first round at Monza, before Nick Leventis purchased the team's assets and renamed it as "P1 by Strakka Racing".) | 21 | (United Kingdom) Will Stevens | | All |
| (United Kingdom) / P1 Motorsport; (United Kingdom) / P1 by Strakka Racing | 22 | (Finland) Matias Laine | R | All |
| (Italy) Zeta Corse | 23 | (Romania) Mihai Marinescu | R | 1–2 |
| (Italy) Zeta Corse | 23 | (Spain) Carlos Sainz Jr. | R | 3–4 |
| (Italy) Zeta Corse | 23 | (United Kingdom) William Buller | R | 5–9 |
| (Italy) Zeta Corse | 24 | (France) Emmanuel Piget | R | 1 |
| (Italy) Zeta Corse | 24 | (Switzerland) Mathéo Tuscher | R | 2 |
| (Italy) Zeta Corse | 24 | (United Kingdom) Nick Yelloly | | 3 |
| (Italy) Zeta Corse | 24 | (Romania) Mihai Marinescu | R | 4–5 |
| (Italy) Zeta Corse | 24 | (Italy) Riccardo Agostini | R | 6 |
| (Italy) Zeta Corse | 24 | (Spain) Carlos Sainz Jr. | R | 7–9 |
| (Spain) Pons Racing | 25 | (Switzerland) Zoël Amberg | | All |
| (Spain) Pons Racing | 26 | (Russia) Nikolay Martsenko | | All |
| (Spain) AV Formula | 27 | (France) Arthur Pic | | All |
| (Spain) AV Formula | 28 | (Brazil) Yann Cunha | | All |

| Icon | Meaning |
|---|---|
| R | Series rookie for 2013 |

=== Driver changes ===
- Following a part-time campaign with Tech 1 Racing, Daniel Abt joined the GP2 Series with ART Grand Prix.
- Mikhail Aleshin switched from Team RFR to Tech 1 Racing.
- Jules Bianchi left Tech 1 Racing to race in Formula One with Marussia.
- Sam Bird, who finished third in 2012, left ISR to join Russian Time in the GP2 Series.
- Yann Cunha left Pons Racing to join AV Formula.
- Pietro Fantin graduated from the British Formula 3 to join Formula Renault, where he races for Arden Caterham.
- After losing his seat in DAMS, Lucas Foresti joined at Comtec Racing.
- Vittorio Ghirelli, who raced with Comtec Racing moved to Auto GP.
- Walter Grubmüller left P1 Motorsport after three consecutive seasons.
- Carlos Huertas moved from Fortec to Carlin, the team he raced for in the 2011 British Formula 3 Championship.
- Jazeman Jaafar entered the Formula Renault series with Carlin, the team he placed second with in the 2012 British Formula Three championship.
- Kevin Korjus, who contested the 2012 season with Tech 1 Racing and Lotus, moved to the GP3 Series with Koiranen GP.
- Matias Laine moved from the GP3 Series to race in Formula Renault 3.5 for P1 Motorsport.
- Kevin Magnussen joined DAMS after racing for Carlin in 2012.
- Mihai Marinescu, who finished fifth in the 2012 FIA Formula Two Championship, signed with the Zeta Corse team. After being replaced by Nick Yelloly for the Monaco round of the championship, Marinescu returned to the team for the race at Spa-Francorchamps.
- After one season with BVM Target, Nikolay Martsenko switched to Pons Racing.
- Nigel Melker, who competed in the GP2 Series in 2012, joined Tech 1 Racing.
- Daniil Move switched from P1 Motorsport to SMP Racing by Comtec.
- Formula Renault 2.0 Alps runner-up Norman Nato joined DAMS.
- Arthur Pic switched from DAMS to AV Formula.
- After two years without a drive, Emmanuel Piget made his return to motor racing with Zeta Corse.
- After competing part-time in 2012, César Ramos, Davide Rigon and Daniel Zampieri all moved to the Blancpain Endurance Series, with the three of them co-driving the #44 Kessel Racing car.
- Jake Rosenzweig left the series after 3 years, instead doing a season in GP2 with Barwa Addax.
- Alexander Rossi, who contested the 2012 season with Arden Caterham, left the series, concentrating on his Caterham F1 reserve driver duties.
- Sergey Sirotkin, who raced in the Auto GP World Series and Italian Formula Three in 2012 and contested at Moscow Formula Renault 3.5 Series round with BVM Target, stepped up to the series with ISR.
- After contesting the first three rounds of 2012 before injury, Richie Stanaway moved to the Porsche Supercup.
- Will Stevens signed with P1 Motorsport after a season with Carlin.
- Marlon Stöckinger joined Lotus after racing in GP3 Series.
- After competing in the last three rounds of the 2012 season, Aaro Vainio left Formula Renault to concentrate on GP3.
- Stoffel Vandoorne, the reigning Eurocup Formula Renault 2.0 champion, moved into the Formula Renault 3.5 Series, racing for Fortec Motorsports.
- Giovanni Venturini moved to the GP3 Series full-time.
- Oliver Webb, who competed in Indy Lights in 2012, returned to the series with Fortec Motorsports.
- Christopher Zanella, who finished third in the 2012 FIA Formula Two Championship signed with ISR team.

==== Mid-season changes ====
- FIA Formula Two runner-up Mathéo Tuscher replaced Emmanuel Piget at Zeta Corse after the first round.
- Carlos Sainz Jr. joined Zeta Corse for the third round of the championship in Monaco, replacing Marinescu. Sainz races for the team again for the final three rounds.
- After racing for Comtec Racing in 2012, Nick Yelloly moved to the GP3 Series with Carlin. Yelloly returned to Formula Renault for the Monaco round, replacing Mathéo Tuscher at Zeta Corse. Marinescu returned for the Belgian and Russian rounds. At the Red Bull Ring, the seat was occupied by Italian Formula Three champion Riccardo Agostini.
- William Buller replaced Sainz Jr. for the Moscow Raceway round.

=== Team changes ===
- Former Formula Renault 3.5 driver Adrián Vallés returned to the category as team owner of AV Formula.
- BVM Target was demoted from racing team to reserve team when series organisers released a provisional entry list in November 2012. The team was divided into two entries; Zeta Management and MT Motorsport, which was previously known as the Max Travin Racing Team. The team was later accepted onto the grid under the name Zeta Corse and registered as an Italian team.
- Team RFR—previously known as KMP Racing—left the series after the 2012 season.

== Race calendar and results ==
The calendar for the 2013 season was announced on 20 October 2012, the day before the end of the 2012 season. Seven of the nine rounds formed meetings of the 2013 World Series by Renault season, with additional rounds in support of the Superstars Series at Monza, and the 2013 Monaco Grand Prix. The championship visited the Red Bull Ring for the first time and returned to Monza. The Nürburgring and Silverstone have been removed from the schedule.

| Round | | Circuit | Date | Pole position | Fastest lap | Winning driver | Winning team | Rookie winner |
|---|---|---|---|---|---|---|---|---|
| 1 | R1 | (Italy) Monza Circuit | 6 April | (Belgium) Stoffel Vandoorne | (United Kingdom) Will Stevens | (Belgium) Stoffel Vandoorne | (United Kingdom) Fortec Motorsports | (Belgium) Stoffel Vandoorne |
| 1 | R2 | (Italy) Monza Circuit | 7 April | (Portugal) António Félix da Costa | (France) Arthur Pic | (Portugal) António Félix da Costa | (United Kingdom) Arden Caterham | (Belgium) Stoffel Vandoorne |
| 2 | R1 | (Spain) Ciudad del Motor de Aragón, Alcañiz | 27 April | (Denmark) Kevin Magnussen | (Denmark) Kevin Magnussen | (Denmark) Kevin Magnussen | (France) DAMS | (Russia) Sergey Sirotkin |
| 2 | R2 | (Spain) Ciudad del Motor de Aragón, Alcañiz | 28 April (Note: Both qualifying and the race for the second event at Aragon were shortened and the mandatory pit-stop cancelled after problems with Zytek engines were detected.) | (France) Norman Nato | (Colombia) Carlos Huertas | (Colombia) Carlos Huertas | (United Kingdom) Carlin | (Russia) Sergey Sirotkin |
| 3 | | Circuit de Monaco, Monte Carlo | 26 May | (Switzerland) Nico Müller | (Netherlands) Nigel Melker | (Switzerland) Nico Müller | (Italy) International Draco Racing | (Malaysia) Jazeman Jaafar |
| 4 | R1 | (Belgium) Circuit de Spa-Francorchamps, Spa | 1 June | (Denmark) Kevin Magnussen | (Brazil) Lucas Foresti | (Denmark) Kevin Magnussen | (France) DAMS | (Malaysia) Jazeman Jaafar |
| 4 | R2 | (Belgium) Circuit de Spa-Francorchamps, Spa | 2 June | (Denmark) Kevin Magnussen | (Denmark) Kevin Magnussen | (Belgium) Stoffel Vandoorne | (United Kingdom) Fortec Motorsports | (Belgium) Stoffel Vandoorne |
| 5 | R1 | (Russia) Moscow Raceway, Volokolamsk | 22 June | (Belgium) Stoffel Vandoorne | (Belgium) Stoffel Vandoorne | (Belgium) Stoffel Vandoorne | (United Kingdom) Fortec Motorsports | (Belgium) Stoffel Vandoorne |
| 5 | R2 | (Russia) Moscow Raceway, Volokolamsk | 23 June | (Belgium) Stoffel Vandoorne | (Belgium) Stoffel Vandoorne | (Belgium) Stoffel Vandoorne | (United Kingdom) Fortec Motorsports | (Belgium) Stoffel Vandoorne |
| 6 | R1 | (Austria) Red Bull Ring, Spielberg | 20 July | (Denmark) Marco Sørensen | (Netherlands) Nigel Melker | (Denmark) Marco Sørensen | (Czech Republic) Lotus | (United Kingdom) William Buller |
| 6 | R2 | (Austria) Red Bull Ring, Spielberg | 21 July | (Denmark) Marco Sørensen | (Denmark) Marco Sørensen | (Denmark) Marco Sørensen | (Czech Republic) Lotus | (Russia) Sergey Sirotkin |
| 7 | R1 | (Hungary) Hungaroring, Budapest | 14 September | (Brazil) André Negrão | (Spain) Carlos Sainz Jr. | (Switzerland) Nico Müller | (Italy) International Draco Racing | (Russia) Sergey Sirotkin |
| 7 | R2 | (Hungary) Hungaroring, Budapest | 15 September | (Denmark) Kevin Magnussen | (Portugal) António Félix da Costa | (Portugal) António Félix da Costa | (United Kingdom) Arden Caterham | (Belgium) Stoffel Vandoorne |
| 8 | R1 | (France) Circuit Paul Ricard, Le Castellet | 28 September | (Denmark) Kevin Magnussen | (Denmark) Kevin Magnussen | (Portugal) António Félix da Costa | (United Kingdom) Arden Caterham | (Belgium) Stoffel Vandoorne |
| 8 | R2 | (France) Circuit Paul Ricard, Le Castellet | 29 September | (Denmark) Kevin Magnussen | (Portugal) António Félix da Costa | (Denmark) Kevin Magnussen | (France) DAMS | (United Kingdom) William Buller |
| 9 | R1 | (Spain) Circuit de Barcelona-Catalunya, Barcelona | 19 October | (Denmark) Kevin Magnussen | (Denmark) Kevin Magnussen | (Denmark) Kevin Magnussen | (France) DAMS | (Belgium) Stoffel Vandoorne |
| 9 | R2 | (Spain) Circuit de Barcelona-Catalunya, Barcelona | 20 October | (Denmark) Kevin Magnussen | (United Kingdom) Will Stevens | (Denmark) Kevin Magnussen | (France) DAMS | (Belgium) Stoffel Vandoorne |

== Championship standings ==
=== Drivers' Championship ===
| Pos | Driver | MNZ (Italy) | | ARA (Spain) | | MON (Monaco) | SPA (Belgium) | | MSC (Russia) | | RBR (Austria) | | HUN (Hungary) | | LEC (France) | | CAT (Spain) | | Points |
|---|---|---|---|---|---|---|---|---|---|---|---|---|---|---|---|---|---|---|---|
| 1 | (Denmark) Kevin Magnussen | 2 | 2 | **1** | 9 | 4 | **1** | **3** | 11 | 2 | 3 | 3 | 2 | **2** | **DSQ** | **1** | **1** | **1** | 274 |
| 2 | (Belgium) Stoffel Vandoorne | **1** | 3 | 8 | 3 | 9 | 13 | 1 | **1** | **1** | Ret | Ret | 4 | 3 | 2 | Ret | 3 | 2 | 214 |
| 3 | (Portugal) António Félix da Costa | Ret | **1** | 13 | 7 | 5 | 2 | 4 | 2 | Ret | 7 | Ret | Ret | 1 | 1 | 3 | 4 | 13 | 172 |
| 4 | (United Kingdom) Will Stevens | 18 | Ret | 2 | 4 | 7 | Ret | 2 | 4 | 3 | 4 | 6 | 8 | Ret | 5 | 13 | 2 | 3 | 148 |
| 5 | (Switzerland) Nico Müller | 13 | 5 | Ret | 5 | **1** | Ret | 5 | 7 | 4 | 13 | 8 | 1 | 5 | 10 | 2 | 12 | 4 | 143 |
| 6 | (Netherlands) Nigel Melker | 5 | 11 | 6 | 6 | 17 | 3 | 6 | 3 | 15 | 2 | 2 | 6 | 4 | Ret | 4 | Ret | 8 | 136 |
| 7 | (Denmark) Marco Sørensen | 19 | 18 | 9 | 10 | 2 | 5 | 10 | 10 | 17 | **1** | **1** | 12 | 9 | 4 | 5 | Ret | 7 | 113 |
| 8 | (France) Arthur Pic | 6 | 4 | 3 | Ret | 10 | 4 | Ret | 12 | 16 | 5 | 20 | 9 | Ret | 6 | 7 | Ret | Ret | 74 |
| 9 | (Russia) Sergey Sirotkin | Ret | 19† | 4 | 2 | 22 | 18 | 8 | DNS | 11 | Ret | 4 | 3 | 12 | (Note: Sirotkin missed the first race at Le Castellet, due to commitments with Sauber in Sochi, Russia.) | Ret | Ret | Ret | 61 |
| 10 | (Brazil) André Negrão | 11 | 13 | Ret | 8 | 12 | 7 | Ret | 6 | 6 | 9 | 11 | **21**† | 6 | 3 | 11 | Ret | Ret | 51 |
| 11 | (United Kingdom) William Buller | | | | | | | | 5 | 20 | 6 | 5 | Ret | 16 | 8 | 8 | 5 | Ret | 46 |
| 12 | (Russia) Mikhail Aleshin | 15 | 14 | 10 | 11 | 8 | 14 | Ret | 16 | 5 | Ret | 18 | 5 | 13 | 17† | 6 | Ret | 14 | 33 |
| 13 | (France) Norman Nato | 10 | 6 | 5 | **20** | Ret | 15 | 15 | 13 | 10 | Ret | 10 | 15 | 11 | 18 | 9 | Ret | 5 | 33 |
| 14 | (Colombia) Carlos Huertas | 16 | 16 | 20 | 1 | 15 | 10 | Ret | 15 | 19 | Ret | Ret | 17 | 8 | Ret | 18 | Ret | 18 | 30 |
| 15 | (United Kingdom) Oliver Webb | 4 | 9 | 11 | 17 | 11 | 12 | 9 | 9 | 7 | DNS | 16 | 16 | 10 | 13 | 22 | 10 | 10 | 27 |
| 16 | (Switzerland) Christopher Zanella | 3 | 8 | 7 | Ret | Ret | 11 | 13 | 22 | 23 | 16 | 14 | Ret | 19 | Ret | 19 | Ret | 11 | 25 |
| 17 | (Malaysia) Jazeman Jaafar | 7 | Ret | 18 | 12 | 3 | 9 | 19† | Ret | 13 | 10 | 13 | 20 | 20 | 14 | 14 | (Note: Jaafar missed the final round at Barcelona after suffering from severe parotiditis.) | | 24 |
| 18 | (Philippines) Marlon Stöckinger | 14 | 12 | 19 | DNS | Ret | 20 | 17 | 8 | 12 | 8 | 7 | 13 | 7 | 15 | 10 | Ret | 9 | 23 |
| 19 | (Spain) Carlos Sainz Jr. | | | | | 6 | Ret | 18† | | | | | 7 | 22 | 16† | Ret | Ret | 6 | 22 |
| 20 | (Russia) Nikolay Martsenko | Ret | Ret | 12 | 21 | 21 | 6 | 7 | Ret | 14 | Ret | Ret | 11 | Ret | 7 | 12 | 13† | 17 | 20 |
| 21 | (Brazil) Pietro Fantin | Ret | 7 | Ret | 18 | Ret | 16 | 12 | 18 | 8 | Ret | 9 | Ret | 14 | 11 | 20 | 9 | 20 | 14 |
| 22 | (Russia) Daniil Move | Ret | NC | 21 | 15 | 13 | 8 | Ret | 17 | 9 | 14 | 17 | 18 | Ret | 9 | 21 | 8 | Ret | 12 |
| 23 | (Finland) Matias Laine | 9 | Ret | 16 | 14 | 19 | 17 | 11 | 14 | 21 | Ret | 15 | 10 | 15 | Ret | 16 | 7 | 16 | 9 |
| 24 | (Switzerland) Zoël Amberg | 12 | 20 | 17 | 19 | 20 | 19 | 16 | 21 | 22 | 11 | 19† | 19 | 18 | 12 | 15 | 6 | 12 | 8 |
| 25 | (Romania) Mihai Marinescu | 8 | 10 | Ret | Ret | | 21 | 14 | 20 | 18 | | | | | | | | | 5 |
| 26 | (Brazil) Lucas Foresti | Ret | Ret | 14 | 16 | 16 | 22 | Ret | Ret | DNS | 12 | 21† | 14 | 17 | Ret | 17 | 11 | 15 | 0 |
| 27 | (Brazil) Yann Cunha | Ret | 15 | 15 | 13 | 18 | Ret | Ret | 19 | Ret | 15 | 12 | Ret | 21 | Ret | Ret | Ret | 19 | 0 |
| 28 | (United Kingdom) Nick Yelloly | | | | | 14 | | | | | | | | | | | | | 0 |
| 29 | (France) Emmanuel Piget | 17 | 17 | | | | | | | | | | | | | | | | 0 |
| 30 | (Switzerland) Mathéo Tuscher | | | 22 | 22† | | | | | | | | | | | | | | 0 |
| | (Italy) Riccardo Agostini | | | | | | | | | | Ret | Ret | | | | | | | 0 |
| Pos | Driver | MNZ (Italy) | | ARA (Spain) | | MON (Monaco) | SPA (Belgium) | | MSC (Russia) | | RBR (Austria) | | HUN (Hungary) | | LEC (France) | | CAT (Spain) | | Points |

| Colour | Result |
|---|---|
| Gold | Winner |
| Silver | Second place |
| Bronze | Third place |
| Green | Points classification |
| Blue | Non-points classification |
| Blue | Non-classified finish (NC) |
| Purple | Retired, not classified (Ret) |
| Red | Did not qualify (DNQ) |
| Red | Did not pre-qualify (DNPQ) |
| Black | Disqualified (DSQ) |
| White | Did not start (DNS) |
| White | Withdrew (WD) |
| White | Race cancelled (C) |
| Blank | Did not practice (DNP) |
| Blank | Did not arrive (DNA) |
| Blank | Excluded (EX) |

**Bold** – Pole
Italics – Fastest Lap
† – Retired, but classified

=== Teams' Championship ===
| Pos | Team | Car No. | MNZ (Italy) | | ARA (Spain) | | MON (Monaco) | SPA (Belgium) | | MSC (Russia) | | RBR (Austria) | | HUN (Hungary) | | LEC (France) | | CAT (Spain) | | Points |
|---|---|---|---|---|---|---|---|---|---|---|---|---|---|---|---|---|---|---|---|---|
| 1 | (France) DAMS | 19 | 10 | 6 | 5 | **20** | Ret | 15 | 15 | 13 | 10 | Ret | 10 | 15 | 11 | 18 | 9 | Ret | 5 | 307 |
| 1 | (France) DAMS | 20 | 2 | 2 | **1** | 9 | 4 | **1** | **3** | 11 | 2 | 3 | 3 | 2 | **2** | **DSQ** | **1** | **1** | **1** | 307 |
| 2 | (United Kingdom) Fortec Motorsports | 5 | **1** | 3 | 8 | 3 | 9 | 13 | 1 | **1** | **1** | Ret | Ret | 4 | 3 | 2 | Ret | 3 | 2 | 241 |
| 2 | (United Kingdom) Fortec Motorsports | 6 | 4 | 9 | 11 | 17 | 11 | 12 | 9 | 9 | 7 | DNS | 16 | 16 | 10 | 13 | 22 | 10 | 10 | 241 |
| 3 | (Italy) International Draco Racing | 17 | 11 | 13 | Ret | 8 | 12 | 7 | Ret | 6 | 6 | 9 | 11 | **21**† | 6 | 3 | 11 | 12 | Ret | 194 |
| 3 | (Italy) International Draco Racing | 18 | 13 | 5 | Ret | 5 | **1** | Ret | 5 | 7 | 4 | 13 | 8 | 1 | 5 | 10 | 2 | Ret | 4 | 194 |
| 4 | (United Kingdom) Arden Caterham | 3 | Ret | **1** | 13 | 7 | 5 | 2 | 4 | 2 | Ret | 7 | Ret | Ret | 1 | 1 | 3 | 4 | 13 | 186 |
| 4 | (United Kingdom) Arden Caterham | 4 | Ret | 7 | Ret | 18 | Ret | 16 | 12 | 18 | 8 | Ret | 9 | Ret | 14 | 11 | 20 | 9 | 20 | 186 |
| 5 | (France) Tech 1 Racing | 1 | 15 | 14 | 10 | 11 | 8 | 14 | Ret | 16 | 5 | Ret | 18 | 5 | 13 | 17† | 6 | Ret | 14 | 169 |
| 5 | (France) Tech 1 Racing | 2 | 5 | 11 | 6 | 6 | 17 | 3 | 6 | 3 | 15 | 2 | 2 | 6 | 4 | Ret | 4 | Ret | 8 | 169 |
| 6 | (United Kingdom) / P1 Motorsport; (United Kingdom) / P1 by Strakka Racing | 21 | 18 | Ret | 2 | 4 | 7 | Ret | 2 | 4 | 3 | 4 | 6 | 8 | Ret | 5 | 13 | 2 | 3 | 157 |
| 6 | (United Kingdom) / P1 Motorsport; (United Kingdom) / P1 by Strakka Racing | 22 | 9 | Ret | 16 | 14 | 19 | 17 | 11 | 15 | 21 | Ret | 15 | 10 | 15 | Ret | 16 | 7 | 16 | 157 |
| 7 | (Czech Republic) Lotus | 9 | 19 | 18 | 9 | 10 | 2 | 5 | 10 | 10 | 17 | **1** | **1** | 12 | 9 | 4 | 5 | Ret | 7 | 136 |
| 7 | (Czech Republic) Lotus | 10 | 14 | 12 | 19 | DNS | Ret | 20 | 17 | 8 | 12 | 8 | 7 | 13 | 7 | 15 | 10 | Ret | 9 | 136 |
| 8 | (Czech Republic) ISR | 7 | Ret | 19† | 4 | 2 | 22 | 18 | 8 | Ret | 11 | Ret | 4 | 3 | 12 | | Ret | Ret | Ret | 86 |
| 8 | (Czech Republic) ISR | 8 | 3 | 8 | 7 | Ret | Ret | 11 | 13 | 22 | 23 | 16 | 14 | Ret | 19 | Ret | 19 | Ret | 11 | 86 |
| 9 | (Spain) AV Formula | 27 | 6 | 4 | 3 | Ret | 10 | 4 | Ret | 12 | 16 | 5 | 20 | 9 | Ret | 6 | 7 | Ret | Ret | 74 |
| 9 | (Spain) AV Formula | 28 | Ret | 15 | 15 | 13 | 18 | Ret | Ret | 19 | Ret | 15 | 21 | Ret | 21 | Ret | Ret | Ret | 19 | 74 |
| 10 | (Italy) Zeta Corse | 23 | 8 | 10 | Ret | Ret | 6 | Ret | 18† | 5 | 20 | 6 | 5 | Ret | 16 | 8 | 8 | 5 | Ret | 73 |
| 10 | (Italy) Zeta Corse | 24 | 17 | 17 | 22 | 22† | 14 | 21 | 14 | 20 | 18 | Ret | Ret | 7 | 22 | 16† | Ret | Ret | 6 | 73 |
| 11 | (United Kingdom) Carlin | 11 | 16 | 16 | 20 | 1 | 15 | 10 | Ret | 15 | 19 | Ret | Ret | 17 | 8 | Ret | 18 | Ret | 18 | 54 |
| 11 | (United Kingdom) Carlin | 12 | 7 | Ret | 18 | 12 | 3 | 9 | 19† | Ret | 13 | 10 | 13 | 20 | 20 | 14 | 14 | | | 54 |
| 12 | (Spain) Pons Racing | 25 | 12 | 20 | 17 | 19 | 20 | 19 | 16 | 21 | 22 | 11 | 19† | 19 | 18 | 12 | 15 | 6 | 12 | 28 |
| 12 | (Spain) Pons Racing | 26 | Ret | Ret | 12 | 21 | 21 | 6 | 7 | Ret | 14 | Ret | Ret | 11 | Ret | 7 | 12 | 13 | 17 | 28 |
| 13 | (United Kingdom) SMP Racing by Comtec | 15 | Ret | NC | 21 | 15 | 13 | 8 | Ret | 17 | 9 | 14 | 17 | 18 | Ret | 9 | 21 | 8 | Ret | 12 |
| 13 | (United Kingdom) SMP Racing by Comtec | 16 | Ret | Ret | 14 | 16 | 16 | 22 | Ret | Ret | DNS | 12 | 21† | 14 | 17 | Ret | 17 | 11 | 15 | 12 |
| Pos | Team | Car No. | MNZ (Italy) | | ARA (Spain) | | MON (Monaco) | SPA (Belgium) | | MSC (Russia) | | RBR (Austria) | | HUN (Hungary) | | LEC (France) | | CAT (Spain) | | Points |

| Colour | Result |
|---|---|
| Gold | Winner |
| Silver | Second place |
| Bronze | Third place |
| Green | Points classification |
| Blue | Non-points classification |
| Blue | Non-classified finish (NC) |
| Purple | Retired, not classified (Ret) |
| Red | Did not qualify (DNQ) |
| Red | Did not pre-qualify (DNPQ) |
| Black | Disqualified (DSQ) |
| White | Did not start (DNS) |
| White | Withdrew (WD) |
| White | Race cancelled (C) |
| Blank | Did not practice (DNP) |
| Blank | Did not arrive (DNA) |
| Blank | Excluded (EX) |

- Polesitter for each race in **bold**. No points are awarded.
- Driver who recorded fastest lap denoted in italics. No points are awarded.
- Driver who retired but was classified denoted by †.
