= Christopher Zanella =

Swiss racing driver

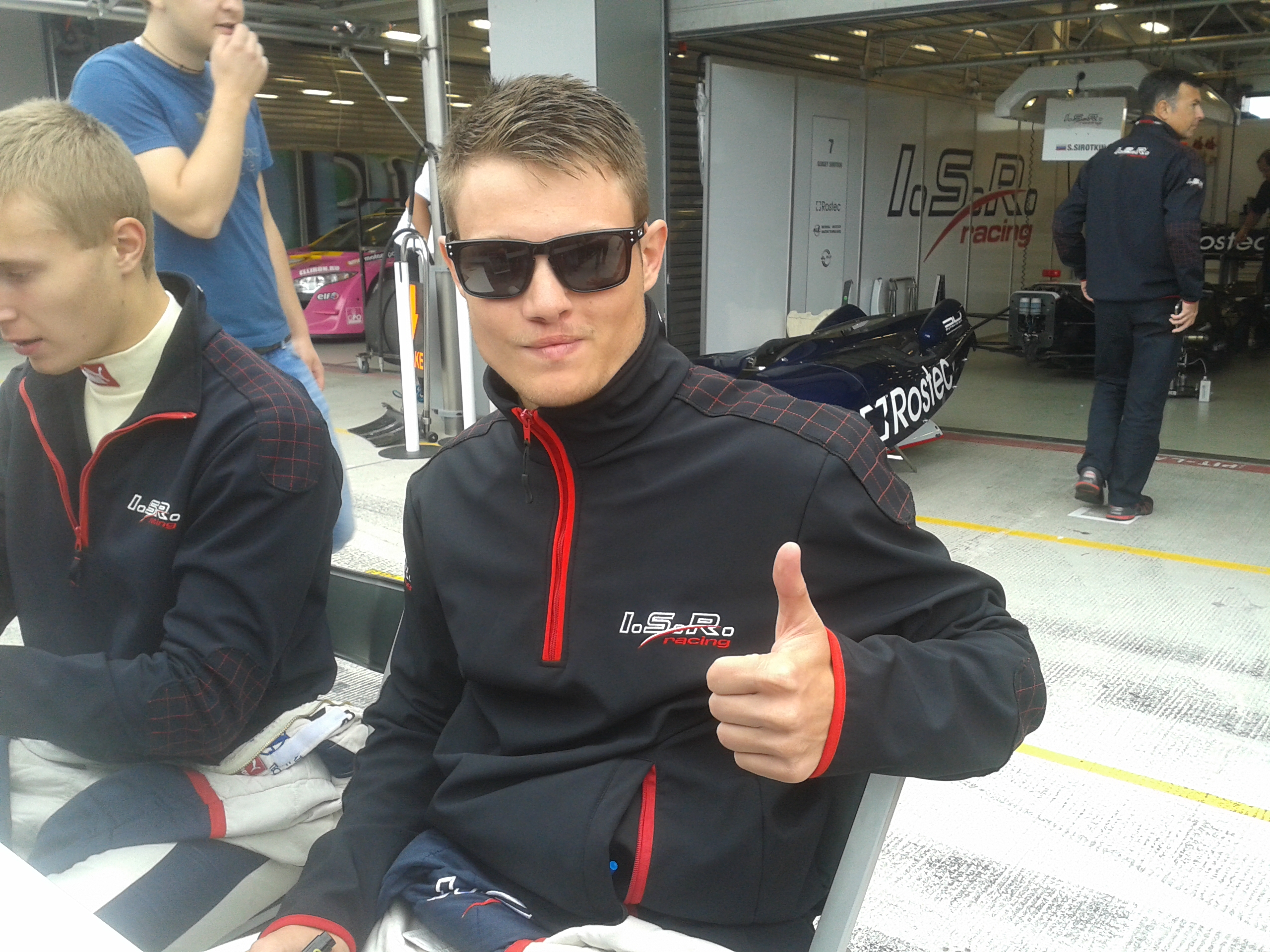
- Zanella in 2013.
- Nationality: (Switzerland) Swiss
- Born: 21 October 1989 (age 37) Waldshut-Tiengen, Germany

Formula Renault 3.5 Series career
- Debut season: 2013
- Current team: ISR
- Categorisation: FIA Silver
- Car number: 8
- Starts: 17
- Wins: 0
- Poles: 0
- Fastest laps: 0
- Best finish: 16th in 2013

Previous series
- 2011–12 2010 2009–10 2008 2007–08: FIA Formula Two Championship; Italian Formula Three; Formula 3 Euro Series; Eurocup Formula Renault 2.0; Formula Renault 2.0 Switzerland

Championship titles
- 2008: Formula Renault 2.0 Switzerland

Christopher Zanella (born 21 October 1989) is a Swiss former racing driver.

== Career ==
=== Formula Renault 2.0 Switzerland ===
Zanella, born in Waldshut-Tiengen, began competing in formula racing with Formula Renault 2.0 Switzerland in 2007. In 2008, he won the championship. He later competed in Formula Three Euroseries and the Eurocup Formula Renault 2.0.

=== Formula Two ===
In 2011, Zanella moved to the FIA Formula Two Championship. His season began well, and he led the championship after four races, having won both races in the Magny Cours round. He remained in Formula Two for 2012, winning twice during the year in Nürburgring and Autodromo Nazionale Monza, the latter of which was also the last ever race for Formula Two.

=== Formula Renault 3.5 Series ===
After the FIA Formula Two Championship was disbanded in the end of 2012, Zanella tested with various Formula Renault 3.5 teams during the 2012-13 off-season, He signed with Czech team ISR Racing partnering Russian driver Sergey Sirotkin. In his series debut in Monza, he finished third in the race. He also won the last Formula Two race ever also in Monza coinciding with his podium in his debut, and in Race 2, he finished eighth, giving him 19 points during the weekend.

== Racing record ==
=== Complete Eurocup Formula Renault 2.0 results ===
(key) (Races in bold indicate pole position; races in italics indicate fastest lap)

| Year | Entrant | 1 | 2 | 3 | 4 | 5 | 6 | 7 | 8 | 9 | 10 | 11 | 12 | 13 | 14 | DC | Points |
|---|---|---|---|---|---|---|---|---|---|---|---|---|---|---|---|---|---|
| 2008 | Race Performance | SPA; 1 | SPA; 2 | SIL; 1 | SIL; 2 | HUN; 1; 25 | HUN; 2; 26 | | | | | | | | | 43rd | 0 |
| 2008 | Jenzer Motorsport | | | | | | | NÜR; 1; 31 | NÜR; 2; 17 | LMS; 1 | LMS; 2 | EST; 1 | EST; 2 | CAT; 1 | CAT; 2 | 43rd | 0 |

=== Complete Formula 3 Euro Series results ===
(key) (Races in bold indicate pole position; races in italics indicate fastest lap)

| Year | Entrant | Chassis | Engine | 1 | 2 | 3 | 4 | 5 | 6 | 7 | 8 | 9 | 10 | 11 | 12 | 13 | 14 | 15 | 16 | 17 | 18 | 19 | 20 | DC | Points |
|---|---|---|---|---|---|---|---|---|---|---|---|---|---|---|---|---|---|---|---|---|---|---|---|---|---|
| 2009 | Motopark Academy | Dallara F308/099 | Mercedes | HOC; 1; 14 | HOC; 2 Ret | LAU; 1; 14 | LAU; 2; 8 | NOR; 1 Ret | NOR; 2 Ret | ZAN; 1; 21† | ZAN; 2; 16 | OSC; 1; 13 | OSC; 2 Ret | NÜR; 1; 14 | NÜR; 2 Ret | BRH; 1; 5 | BRH; 2; 7 | CAT; 1; 14 | CAT; 2; 12 | DIJ; 1; 7 | DIJ; 2; 12 | HOC; 1; 19 | HOC; 2; 2 | 13th | 11 |
| 2010 | Motopark Academy | Dallara F308/092 | Mercedes | LEC; 1 | LEC; 2 | HOC; 1 | HOC; 2 | VAL; 1 | VAL; 2 | NOR; 1 | NOR; 2 | NÜR; 1; 10 | NÜR; 2 Ret | ZAN; 1; 9 | ZAN; 2; 7 | BRH; 1 DNS | BRH; 2 DNS | OSC; 1 | OSC; 2 | | | | | 15th | 2 |
| 2010 | Motopark Academy | Dallara F308/099 | Mercedes | | | | | | | | | | | | | | | | | HOC; 1; 7 | HOC; 2 Ret | | | 15th | 2 |

† Driver did not finish the race, but was classified as he completed over 90% of the race distance.

=== Complete FIA Formula Two Championship results ===
(key) (Races in bold indicate pole position) (Races in italics indicate fastest lap)

| Year | 1 | 2 | 3 | 4 | 5 | 6 | 7 | 8 | 9 | 10 | 11 | 12 | 13 | 14 | 15 | 16 | Pos | Points |
|---|---|---|---|---|---|---|---|---|---|---|---|---|---|---|---|---|---|---|
| 2011 | SIL; 1; 7 | SIL; 2; 3 | MAG; 1; 1 | **MAG**; **2**; 1 | SPA; 1; 3 | SPA; 2; 2 | NÜR; 1; 2 | NÜR; 2; 3 | BRH; 1; 6 | BRH; 2; 7 | RBR; 1; 12 | **RBR**; **2**; 4 | MNZ; 1; 5 | MNZ; 2; 6 | CAT; 1; 6 | CAT; 2; 7 | **2nd** | **189** |
| 2012 | SIL; 1; 2 | SIL; 2; 8 | ALG; 1; 6 | ALG; 2; 4 | NÜR; 1; 3 | **NÜR**; **2**; 1 | SPA; 1; 5 | SPA; 2; 4 | BRH; 1; 6 | BRH; 2; 2 | LEC; 1; 8 | LEC; 2; 3 | HUN; 1; 5 | HUN; 2; 6 | MNZ; 1; 2 | MNZ; 2; 1 | **3rd** | **196** |

=== Complete Formula Renault 3.5 Series results ===
(key) (Races in bold indicate pole position) (Races in italics indicate fastest lap)

| Year | Team | 1 | 2 | 3 | 4 | 5 | 6 | 7 | 8 | 9 | 10 | 11 | 12 | 13 | 14 | 15 | 16 | 17 | Pos | Points |
|---|---|---|---|---|---|---|---|---|---|---|---|---|---|---|---|---|---|---|---|---|
| 2013 | ISR | MNZ; 1; 3 | MNZ; 2; 8 | ALC; 1; 7 | ALC; 2 Ret | MON; 1 Ret | SPA; 1; 11 | SPA; 2; 13 | MSC; 1; 22 | MSC; 2; 23 | RBR; 1; 16 | RBR; 2; 14 | HUN; 1 Ret | HUN; 2; 19 | LEC; 1 Ret | LEC; 2; 19 | CAT; 1 Ret | CAT; 2; 11 | 16th | 25 |
