= Emmanuel Piget =

French racing driver

- Nationality: (France) French
- Born: 25 February 1984 (age 42) Cognac, France
- Categorisation: FIA Bronze

Emmanuel Maxime Piget (born 25 February 1984 in Cognac) is a French racing driver. He competed in the Formula Renault 3.5 Series in 2013, and in the European Endurance Prototype Cup in 2026.

== Career ==
Piget began his racing career in karting in 1997. He competed in karting until 2000. From 2001 to 2002, he took part in some races of the Formula Renault 2000 Eurocup. From 2002 until 2004, he started in the French Formula Renault.

After a time without racing, Piget returned to the motorsport in 2009. He competed in some races of the European F3 Open Championship in 2009 und 2010. His best results were two third places.

In 2013, Piget got a cockpit in the Formula Renault 3.5 at the new team Zeta Corse.

== Career summary ==
- 1997–2000: Karting
- 2001: Formula Renault 2000 Eurocup
- 2002: Formula Renault 2000 Eurocup
- 2002: French Formula Renault (17th position)
- 2003: French Formula Renault (10th position)
- 2004: French Formula Renault (25th position)
- 2004: Spanish Formula 3, Winter Series
- 2009: European F3 Open (23rd position)
- 2010: European F3 Open (10th position)
- 2013: Formula Renault 3.5
- 2026: European Endurance Prototype Cup

=== Complete Formula Renault 3.5 Series results ===
(key) (Races in bold indicate pole position) (Races in italics indicate fastest lap)

Year	Team	1	2	3	4	5	6	7	8	9	10	11	12	13	14	15	16	17	Pos	Points
2013	Zeta Corse	MNZ; 1; 17	MNZ; 2; 17	ALC; 1	ALC; 2	MON; 1	SPA; 1	SPA; 2	MSC; 1	MSC; 2	RBR; 1	RBR; 2	HUN; 1	HUN; 2	LEC; 1	LEC; 2	CAT; 1	CAT; 2	29th	0
