= Roman Mavlanov =

Russian racing driver

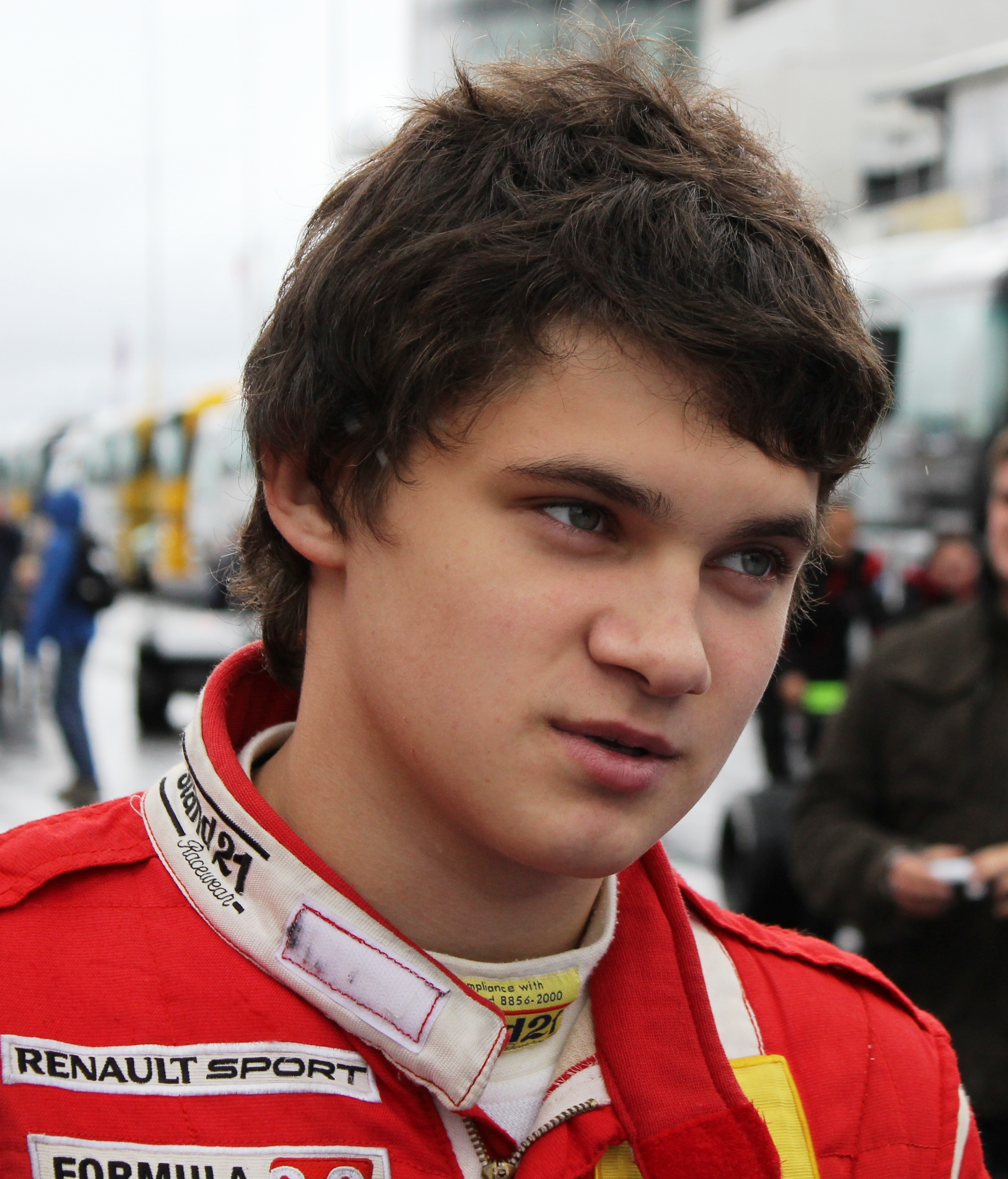
- Mavlanov in 2012.
- Nationality: (Russia) Russian
- Born: 5 July 1994 (age 32) Moscow, Russia

International GT Open career
- Debut season: 2013
- Current team: SMP Racing Russian Bears
- Categorisation: FIA Silver
- Car number: 60
- Starts: 32
- Wins: 6
- Poles: 3
- Fastest laps: 0
- Best finish: 1st in 2014

Previous series
- 2014 2011–13 2013 2011-12: Formula Renault 3.5 Series; Eurocup Formula Renault 2.0; Formula Renault 2.0 NEC; Formula Renault 2.0 Alps

Championship titles
- 2014: International GT Open

Roman Mavlanov (Russian: Рома́н Мавла́нов, IPA: [rɐˈman mɐvˈlanəv]; born 5 July 1994) is a Russian racing driver.

== Career ==
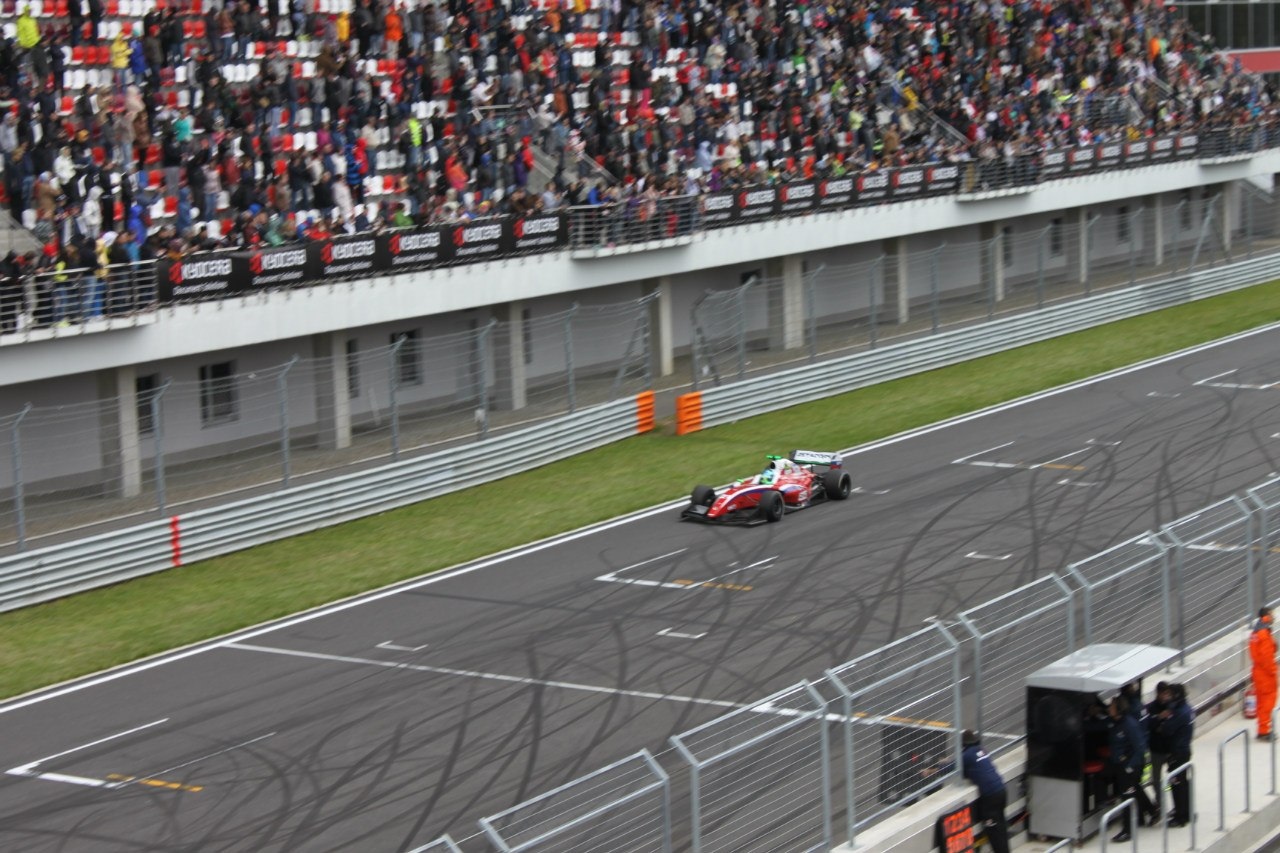
Mavlanov during Race 1 of the 2014 Formula Renault 3.5 Series season at Moscow Raceway.

=== Karting ===
Born in Moscow, Mavlanov began his racing career in karting at the age of 13 in the Russian cups, collecting titles in various classes.

=== Formula Renault ===
Mavlanov made his début in single-seaters in 2011, competing in the Eurocup Formula Renault 2.0 and Formula Renault 2.0 Alps for the Boëtti Racing Team. He ended his Eurocup season without any point-scoring finishes, while in the Alps series, he had ten point-scoring finishes from sixteen races.

Mavlanov switched to Tech 1 Racing in 2012, again competing in both the Eurocup Formula Renault and Formula Renault 2.0 Alps. In the Eurocup he failed to score any points again, while in the Alps series, he degraded to five point-scoring finishes.

Mavlanov joined RC Formula for both the Formula Renault 2.0 NEC and the Eurocup Formula Renault series. In the NEC series he scored his first Formula Renault 2.0 podium, while in the Eurocup, he recorded his worst season with three disqualifications and was excluded from the final round at Barcelona.

=== International GT Open ===
Mavlanov made his sports car racing debut in the GTS class of the International GT Open in 2013, racing for SMP Racing - Russian Bears. He finished fourth in the GTS standings with three class wins.

=== Formula Renault 3.5 Series ===
Mavlanov would move to Formula Renault 3.5 Series in 2014 with Zeta Corse.

== Racing record ==
=== Career summary ===
Season	Series	Team	Races	Wins	Poles	FLaps	Podiums	Points	Position
2011	Eurocup Formula Renault 2.0	Boëtti Racing Team	13	0	0	0	0	0	35th
2011	Formula Renault 2.0 Alps	Boëtti Racing Team	14	0	0	0	0	115	13th
2012	Eurocup Formula Renault 2.0	Tech 1 Racing	14	0	0	0	0	0	33rd
2012	Formula Renault 2.0 Alps	Tech 1 Racing	14	0	0	0	0	28	15th
2013	International GT Open - GTS	SMP Racing - Russian Bears	15	3	0	0	4	0	4th
2013	Spanish GT Championship - GTS	SMP Racing - Russian Bears	6	2	1	0	3	52	5th
2013	Eurocup Formula Renault 2.0	RC Formula	8	0	0	0	0	0	29th
2013	Formula Renault 2.0 NEC	RC Formula	9	0	0	0	1	81	18th
2014	Formula Renault 3.5 Series	Zeta Corse	15	0	0	0	0	0	24th
2014	Blancpain Endurance Series - Pro-Am	SMP Racing - Russian Bears	1	0	0	0	0	0	NC
2014	International GT Open - Super GT	SMP Racing - Russian Bears	16	3	3	0	10	104	**1st**
2015	Lamborghini Super Trofeo Europe - Pro	Antoneli Motorsport	11	1	0	0	0	91	**2nd**
2015	Blancpain GT Sprint Series	GT Russian Team	2	0	0	0	0	6	23rd
2016	NASCAR Whelen Euro Series - Elite 2	Dexwet Renauer Team	2	0	0	0	0	461	14th
2016	NASCAR Whelen Euro Series - Elite 2	DF1 Racing	4	0	0	0	0	461	14th
2016	NASCAR Whelen Euro Series - Elite 2	SPV Racing	4	0	0	0	1	461	14th
2022	24H GT Series - GT3	Lionspeed by Car Collection Motorsport							
2022-23	Middle East Trophy - TCR	Sharky-Racing							
2023	24 Hours of Nürburgring - TCR	sharky-racing by MSC Sinzig e.V. im ADAC	1	0	0	0	0	N/A	5th
2023-24	Middle East Trophy - GT3	Goroyan RT by Car Collection Motorsport							
2024	24 Hours of Nürburgring - SP3T	sharky-racing by MSC Sinzig e.V. im ADAC							
2025	Middle East Trophy - GT3	Car Collection Motorsport							
2025	Nürburgring Langstrecken-Serie - TCR	Goroyan RT by sharky-racing							
2025-26	24H Series Middle East - GT3	Origine Motorsport							

=== Complete Eurocup Formula Renault 2.0 results ===
(key) (Races in bold indicate pole position; races in italics indicate fastest lap)

Year	Entrant	1	2	3	4	5	6	7	8	9	10	11	12	13	14	DC	Points
2011	Boëtti Racing Team	ALC; 1; 20	ALC; 2; 21	SPA; 1 DNS	SPA; 2 Ret	NÜR; 1; 25	NÜR; 2; 15	HUN; 1; 28	HUN; 2 Ret	SIL; 1 Ret	SIL; 2; 26	LEC; 1 Ret	LEC; 2; 23	CAT; 1; 21	CAT; 2; 33	35th	0
2012	Tech 1 Racing	ALC; 1; 17	ALC; 2; 21	SPA; 1; 33	SPA; 2; 28	NÜR; 1; 26	NÜR; 2; 13	MSC; 1; 21	MSC; 2 Ret	HUN; 1; 15	HUN; 2; 12	LEC; 1; 26	LEC; 2 Ret	CAT; 1; 17	CAT; 2 Ret	33rd	0
2013	RC Formula	ALC; 1	ALC; 2	SPA; 1	SPA; 2	MSC; 1 DSQ	MSC; 2; 29	RBR; 1; 13	RBR; 2 Ret	HUN; 1; 15	HUN; 2 Ret	LEC; 1 DSQ	LEC; 2 DSQ	CAT; 1 EX	CAT; 2 EX	29th	0

=== Complete Formula Renault 2.0 Alps Series results ===
(key) (Races in bold indicate pole position; races in italics indicate fastest lap)

Year	Team	1	2	3	4	5	6	7	8	9	10	11	12	13	14	Pos	Points
2011	Boëtti Racing Team	MNZ; 1; 17	MNZ; 2; 7	IMO; 1; 7	IMO; 2 Ret	PAU; 1; 8	PAU; 2; 7	RBR; 1; 10	RBR; 2; 11	HUN; 1; 16	HUN; 2; 10	LEC; 1; 5	LEC; 2; 13	SPA; 1; 15	SPA; 2 Ret	13th	115
2012	Tech 1 Racing	MNZ; 1; 9	MNZ; 2; 7	PAU; 1; 22	PAU; 2; 14	IMO; 1 Ret	IMO; 2; 12	SPA; 1; 7	SPA; 2; 17	RBR; 1 Ret	RBR; 2; 17	MUG; 1; 20	MUG; 2; 11	CAT; 1; 9	CAT; 2; 4	15th	28

=== Complete Formula Renault 2.0 NEC results ===
(key) (Races in bold indicate pole position) (Races in italics indicate fastest lap)

Year	Entrant	1	2	3	4	5	6	7	8	9	10	11	12	13	14	15	16	17	DC	Points
2013	RC Formula	HOC; 1 Ret	HOC; 2; 8	HOC; 3 Ret	NÜR; 1; 16	NÜR; 2; 21	SIL; 1	SIL; 2	SPA; 1; 8	SPA; 2; 6	ASS; 1	ASS; 2	MST; 1	MST; 2	MST; 3	ZAN; 1; 10	ZAN; 2; 2	ZAN; 3 C	18th	81

=== Complete Formula Renault 3.5 Series results ===
(key) (Races in bold indicate pole position) (Races in italics indicate fastest lap)

Year	Team	1	2	3	4	5	6	7	8	9	10	11	12	13	14	15	16	17	Pos	Points
2014	Zeta Corse	MNZ; 1; 13	MNZ; 2; 15	ALC; 1; 17	ALC; 2; 15	MON; 1; 19	SPA; 1; 13	SPA; 2; 16	MSC; 1; 12	MSC; 2 Ret	NÜR; 1; 17	NÜR; 2; 13	HUN; 1; 13	HUN; 2; 16	LEC; 1	LEC; 2	JER; 1; 11	JER; 2 Ret	24th	0

Sporting positions
Preceded by Andrea Montermini	International GT Open champion 2014; With: Daniel Zampieri	Incumbent
