= 2014 Formula Renault 3.5 Series =

European motor racing tournament

Champions
- Drivers' Champion: Carlos Sainz Jr.
- Teams' Champion: DAMS

Seasons
- ← 2013 2015 →

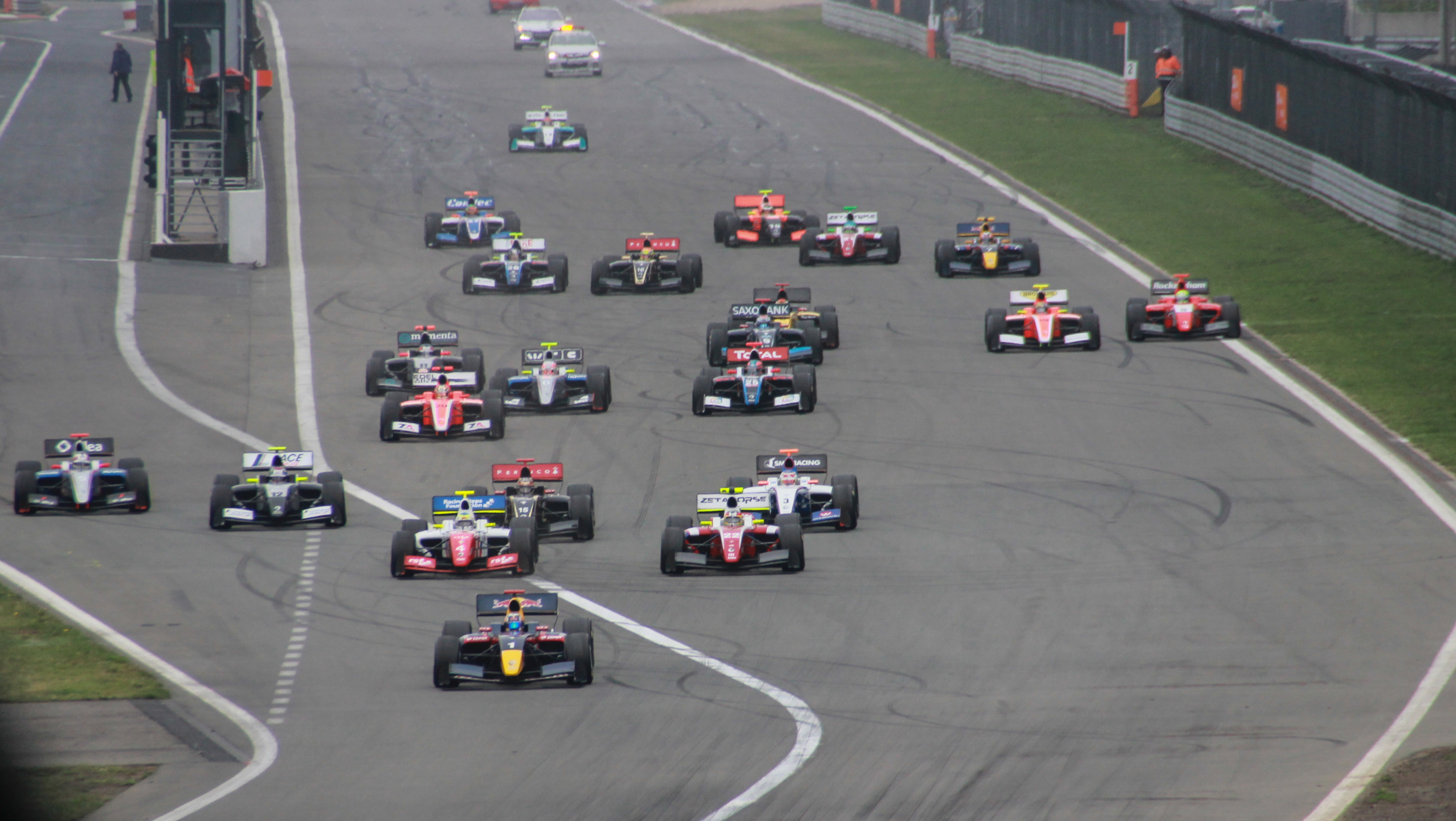
The start of the first race at the Nürburgring, the sixth round of the championship.

The 2014 Formula Renault 3.5 Series season was a multi-event motor racing championship for open wheel, formula racing cars held across Europe. The championship featured drivers competing in 3.5 litre Formula Renault single seat race cars that conformed to the technical regulations for the championship. The 2014 season was the tenth Formula Renault 3.5 Series season organized by Renault Sport. The season began at the Monza Circuit on 12 April and finished on 19 October at Circuito de Jerez. The series formed part of the World Series by Renault meetings at seven double header events, with additional events held at Monza (double header) and a single race in support of the Monaco Grand Prix.

Carlos Sainz Jr. clinched the championship title with seven race wins, after his compatriot and rival Roberto Merhi retired in the penultimate race of the season. Sainz Jr. also became the first Red Bull Junior Team driver to win the championship. Merhi was the only other driver to score more than two wins, but he lost the runner-up position to Pierre Gasly – another Red Bull backed driver – after retiring in the second Jerez race. Fortec Motorsports driver Oliver Rowland won races at Alcañiz and Jerez, finishing fourth. His teammate Sergey Sirotkin completed the top five with a win on home soil at Moscow Raceway. Will Stevens and Norman Nato were the other drivers to achieve race wins in the season; Stevens won at Monza and Jerez, bookending the season, while Nato was the winner of the Monaco Grand Prix support race, and also won at the Hungaroring.

== Teams and drivers ==
Team	No.	Driver name	Status	Rounds
(France) DAMS	1	(Spain) Carlos Sainz Jr.		All
(France) DAMS	2	(France) Norman Nato		All
(United Kingdom) Fortec Motorsports	3	(Russia) Sergey Sirotkin		All
(United Kingdom) Fortec Motorsports	4	(United Kingdom) Oliver Rowland	R	All
(Italy) International Draco Racing	5	(Brazil) Pietro Fantin		All
(Italy) International Draco Racing	6	(Italy) Luca Ghiotto	R	All
(United Kingdom) Arden Motorsport	7	(France) Pierre Gasly	R	All
(United Kingdom) Arden Motorsport	8	(United Kingdom) William Buller		All
(France) Tech 1 Racing	9	(Denmark) Marco Sørensen		All
(France) Tech 1 Racing	10	(Mexico) Alfonso Celis Jr.	R	6
(France) Tech 1 Racing	10	(Canada) Nicholas Latifi	R	7–9
(United Kingdom) Strakka Racing	11	(United Kingdom) Will Stevens		All
(United Kingdom) Strakka Racing	12	(Finland) Matias Laine		All
(Czech Republic) Lotus	15	(Philippines) Marlon Stöckinger		All
(Czech Republic) Lotus	16	(France) Matthieu Vaxivière	R	1–3, 6–9
(Czech Republic) Lotus	16	(New Zealand) Richie Stanaway		4–5
(Czech Republic) ISR	17	(Malaysia) Jazeman Jaafar		All
(Spain) AVF	19	(Netherlands) Beitske Visser	R	All
(Spain) AVF	20	(Switzerland) Zoël Amberg		All
(Russia) Zeta Corse	21	(Russia) Roman Mavlanov	R	1–7, 9
(Russia) Zeta Corse	22	(Spain) Roberto Merhi	R	All
(Spain) Pons Racing	25	(United Kingdom) Oliver Webb		1–3
(Spain) Pons Racing	25	(Colombia) Óscar Tunjo	R	4–9
(Spain) Pons Racing	26	(Netherlands) Meindert van Buuren	R	All
(United Kingdom) Comtec Racing	27	(Russia) Nikolay Martsenko		1–2
(United Kingdom) Comtec Racing	27	(United Kingdom) Cameron Twynham	R	6–8
(United Kingdom) Comtec Racing	28	(Italy) Andrea Roda	R	3
(United Kingdom) Comtec Racing	28	(France) Esteban Ocon	R	7–8

Icon	Meaning
R	Series rookie for 2014

=== Driver changes ===
Changed teams

- After two seasons with Pons Racing, Zoël Amberg switched to the AVF team.
- William Buller, who raced a part-season with Zeta Corse in 2013, moved to Arden Motorsport.
- Pietro Fantin, who drove for Arden Caterham in 2013, switched to International Draco Racing.
- Jazeman Jaafar changed teams from Carlin to ISR.
- Nikolay Martsenko switched from Pons Racing to Comtec Racing.
- Carlos Sainz Jr. who raced a part-season with Zeta Corse in 2013 alongside his GP3 Series campaign, moved to the DAMS team.
- Sergey Sirotkin switched from ISR to Fortec Motorsports.
- Lotus F1 test driver Marco Sørensen moved to Tech 1 Racing after two years with Lotus.
- Oliver Webb, who raced with Fortec Motorsports in 2013, returned for the Monza round of the series with Pons Racing. Webb competed with the team in 2011.

Entering/Re–Entering FR3.5

- Pierre Gasly, the 2013 Eurocup Formula Renault 2.0 champion, joined the series with Arden Motorsport.
- Formula Renault 2.0 Alps runner-up and sporadic Eurocup Formula Renault 2.0 racer Luca Ghiotto made his Formula Renault 3.5 début with International Draco Racing.
- Eurocup Formula Renault driver Roman Mavlanov and DTM driver Roberto Merhi moved to the championship with Zeta Corse.
- Eurocup Formula Renault 2.0 runner-up Oliver Rowland joined British team Fortec Motorsports.
- Auto GP driver Meindert van Buuren graduated to the series with Pons Racing.
- Matthieu Vaxivière, who finished tenth in the 2013 Eurocup Formula Renault 2.0, entered the championship with Lotus.
- Beitske Visser, who raced in ADAC Formel Masters, made her debut in the series with AVF.

Leaving FR3.5

- Riccardo Agostini, who raced for Zeta Corse in one meeting in 2013, moved to the European Formula 3 Championship with EuroInternational.
- 2010 champion Mikhail Aleshin, who drove for Tech 1 Racing in 2013, moved to the IndyCar Series for 2014, racing for Schmidt Peterson Motorsports.
- António Félix da Costa, who finished third for Arden Caterham in 2013, joined the DTM series with BMW.
- Carlos Huertas, who drove for Carlin in 2013, moved to the IndyCar Series for 2014 driving for Dale Coyne Racing.
- Kevin Magnussen, the 2013 champion with DAMS, graduated to Formula One, replacing Sergio Pérez at McLaren.
- Nico Müller, who finished fifth for International Draco Racing in 2013, moved to the DTM series with Audi.
- André Negrão, who drove for International Draco Racing in 2013, joined the GP2 Series with Arden International.
- Arthur Pic, who drove for AV Formula in 2013, entered the GP2 Series with Campos Racing.
- Stoffel Vandoorne, who finished second for Fortec Motorsports in 2013, joined the GP2 Series with ART Grand Prix.

Mid-season changes

- Tech 1 Racing fielded their second car for Alfonso Celis Jr., who made his series début at the Nürburgring. At the Hungaroring and the Circuit Paul Ricard, the seat was occupied by Nicholas Latifi.
- Nikolay Martsenko left the series prior the Monaco round due to financial issues.
- Andrea Roda joined Comtec Racing for the round in Monaco.
- Cameron Twynham joined Comtec Racing for the round at the Nürburgring.
- Richie Stanaway, who previously raced with Lotus in 2012, returned to the team, replacing injured Matthieu Vaxivière.
- Oliver Webb, who concentrated on LMP2 sportscars for the 2014 season, was replaced by Eurocup Formula Renault 2.0 driver Óscar Tunjo from Spa onwards.
- Esteban Ocon joined Comtec Racing for the rounds at the Hungaroring and Paul Ricard.

== Race calendar and results ==
The calendar for the 2014 season was announced on 20 October 2013, the final day of the 2013 season. Seven of the nine rounds formed meetings of the 2014 World Series by Renault season, with additional rounds held at Monza and at the Monaco Grand Prix. The championship visited the Circuito de Jerez for the first time, and returned to the Nürburgring. Races at the Red Bull Ring and Circuit de Barcelona-Catalunya were removed from the schedule, from 2013.

Round		Circuit	Date	Pole position	Fastest lap	Winning driver	Winning team	Rookie winner
1	R1	(Italy) Monza Circuit	12 April	(Spain) Carlos Sainz Jr.	(Spain) Carlos Sainz Jr.	(United Kingdom) Will Stevens	(United Kingdom) Strakka Racing	(Spain) Roberto Merhi
1	R2	(Italy) Monza Circuit	13 April	(Spain) Carlos Sainz Jr.	(Spain) Carlos Sainz Jr.	(Spain) Carlos Sainz Jr.	(France) DAMS	(Italy) Luca Ghiotto
2	R1	(Spain) Ciudad del Motor de Aragón, Alcañiz	26 April	(Spain) Carlos Sainz Jr.	(Spain) Carlos Sainz Jr.	(Spain) Carlos Sainz Jr.	(France) DAMS	(United Kingdom) Oliver Rowland
2	R2	(Spain) Ciudad del Motor de Aragón, Alcañiz	27 April	(United Kingdom) Oliver Rowland	(United Kingdom) Oliver Rowland	(United Kingdom) Oliver Rowland	(United Kingdom) Fortec Motorsports	(United Kingdom) Oliver Rowland
3		Circuit de Monaco, Monte Carlo	25 May	(France) Norman Nato	(France) Norman Nato	(France) Norman Nato	(France) DAMS	(United Kingdom) Oliver Rowland
4	R1	(Belgium) Circuit de Spa-Francorchamps, Spa	31 May	(Spain) Carlos Sainz Jr.	(Spain) Carlos Sainz Jr.	(Spain) Carlos Sainz Jr.	(France) DAMS	(France) Pierre Gasly
4	R2	(Belgium) Circuit de Spa-Francorchamps, Spa	1 June	(Spain) Carlos Sainz Jr.	(Finland) Matias Laine	(Spain) Carlos Sainz Jr.	(France) DAMS	(United Kingdom) Oliver Rowland
5	R1	(Russia) Moscow Raceway, Volokolamsk	28 June	(Russia) Sergey Sirotkin	(Netherlands) Meindert van Buuren	(Russia) Sergey Sirotkin	(United Kingdom) Fortec Motorsports	(Spain) Roberto Merhi
5	R2	(Russia) Moscow Raceway, Volokolamsk	29 June	(Spain) Roberto Merhi	(Spain) Roberto Merhi	(Spain) Roberto Merhi	(Russia) Zeta Corse	(Spain) Roberto Merhi
6	R1	(Germany) Nürburgring, Nürburg	12 July	(Spain) Carlos Sainz Jr.	(Spain) Carlos Sainz Jr.	(Spain) Carlos Sainz Jr.	(France) DAMS	(Spain) Roberto Merhi
6	R2	(Germany) Nürburgring, Nürburg	13 July	(Spain) Roberto Merhi	(Switzerland) Zoël Amberg	(Spain) Roberto Merhi	(Russia) Zeta Corse	(Spain) Roberto Merhi
7	R1	(Hungary) Hungaroring, Budapest	13 September	(United Kingdom) Oliver Rowland	(France) Pierre Gasly	(Spain) Roberto Merhi	(Russia) Zeta Corse	(Spain) Roberto Merhi
7	R2	(Hungary) Hungaroring, Budapest	14 September	(Spain) Roberto Merhi	(France) Pierre Gasly	(France) Norman Nato	(France) DAMS	(Spain) Roberto Merhi
8	R1	(France) Circuit Paul Ricard, Le Castellet	27 September	(Spain) Carlos Sainz Jr.	(France) Pierre Gasly	(Spain) Carlos Sainz Jr.	(France) DAMS	(France) Pierre Gasly
8	R2	(France) Circuit Paul Ricard, Le Castellet	28 September	(France) Pierre Gasly	(Spain) Carlos Sainz Jr.	(Spain) Carlos Sainz Jr.	(France) DAMS	(France) Pierre Gasly
9	R1	(Spain) Circuito de Jerez, Jerez de la Frontera	18 October	(United Kingdom) Will Stevens	(Brazil) Pietro Fantin	(United Kingdom) Will Stevens	(United Kingdom) Strakka Racing	(United Kingdom) Oliver Rowland
9	R2	(Spain) Circuito de Jerez, Jerez de la Frontera	19 October	(United Kingdom) Oliver Rowland	(Brazil) Pietro Fantin	(United Kingdom) Oliver Rowland	(United Kingdom) Fortec Motorsports	(United Kingdom) Oliver Rowland

== Championship standings ==
Points system

Points were awarded to the top 10 classified finishers.

Position	**1st**	**2nd**	**3rd**	**4th**	**5th**	**6th**	**7th**	**8th**	**9th**	**10th**
Points	25	18	15	12	10	8	6	4	2	1

=== Drivers' Championship ===
Pos	Driver	MNZ (Italy)		ARA (Spain)		MON (Monaco)	SPA (Belgium)		MSC (Russia)		NÜR (Germany)		HUN (Hungary)		LEC (France)		JER (Spain)		Points
1	(Spain) Carlos Sainz Jr.	**18**	**1**	**1**	4	4	**1**	**1**	14	6	**1**	Ret	4	6	**1**	1	15	11	227
2	(France) Pierre Gasly	3	5	9	2	7	2	4	18	2	20	8	2	3	2	**2**	6	4	192
3	(Spain) Roberto Merhi	2	9	6	6	9	Ret	13	4	**1**	2	**1**	1	**2**	5	4	Ret	Ret	183
4	(United Kingdom) Oliver Rowland	6	10	3	**1**	5	Ret	3	Ret	5	4	Ret	**3**	4	13	3	2	**1**	181
5	(Russia) Sergey Sirotkin	7	3	8	Ret	Ret	Ret	Ret	**1**	4	3	4	14	Ret	4	7	3	5	132
6	(United Kingdom) Will Stevens	1	Ret	12	3	8	7	2	6	9	11	7	6	10	12	8	**1**	13	122
7	(France) Norman Nato	15	11	11	10	**1**	5	5	17	16	12	6	8	1	10	Ret	8	10	89
8	(France) Matthieu Vaxivière	17†	16	7	8	Ret					13	2	5	7	3	6	4	8	83
9	(Philippines) Marlon Stöckinger	14	2	4	Ret	11	9	11	7	11	5	3	15	14	6	13	Ret	9	73
10	(Malaysia) Jazeman Jaafar	Ret	7	13	9	3	3	6	5	12	15	9	10	8	Ret	5	14	Ret	73
11	(Switzerland) Zoël Amberg	8	13	5	5	6	Ret	Ret	2	8	9	5	Ret	15	11	19	12	14	66
12	(Denmark) Marco Sørensen	Ret	Ret	15	7	2	8	10	15	15	10	14	7	9	8	Ret	9	Ret	44
13	(Finland) Matias Laine	10	12	19	14	13	4	7	8	7	6	Ret	Ret	13	9	17	10	Ret	40
14	(Russia) Nikolay Martsenko	5	6	2	Ret														36
15	(Brazil) Pietro Fantin	11	8	10	12	15	Ret	Ret	3	Ret	7	Ret	Ret	11	Ret	20	Ret	6	34
16	(United Kingdom) William Buller	4	Ret	Ret	Ret	16	11	12	11	10	Ret	10	19	Ret	17	10	Ret	3	30
17	(Italy) Luca Ghiotto	16	4	16	Ret	14	6	Ret	16	14	Ret	15	11	19	7	16	13	Ret	26
18	(New Zealand) Richie Stanaway						Ret	8	9	3									21
19	(Netherlands) Meindert van Buuren	9	Ret	14	11	10	12	9	NC	18	14	Ret	16	5	Ret	14	7	15	21
20	(Canada) Nicholas Latifi												Ret	18	16	9	16	2	20
21	(Netherlands) Beitske Visser	Ret	17	18	16	17	10	14	13	13	19	Ret	17	12	15	11	5	12	11
22	(Colombia) Óscar Tunjo						Ret	15	10	17	8	Ret	12	Ret	18	15	Ret	7	11
23	(France) Esteban Ocon												9	DNS	14	12			2
24	(Russia) Roman Mavlanov	13	15	17	15	19	13	16	12	Ret	17	13	13	16			11	Ret	0
25	(United Kingdom) Cameron Twynham										18	11	18	17	19	18			0
26	(United Kingdom) Oliver Webb	12	14	Ret	13	12													0
27	(Mexico) Alfonso Celis Jr.										16	12							0
28	(Italy) Andrea Roda					18													0
Pos	Driver	MNZ (Italy)		ARA (Spain)		MON (Monaco)	SPA (Belgium)		MSC (Russia)		NÜR (Germany)		HUN (Hungary)		LEC (France)		JER (Spain)		Points

Colour	Result
Gold	Winner
Silver	Second place
Bronze	Third place
Green	Points classification
Blue	Non-points classification
Blue	Non-classified finish (NC)
Purple	Retired, not classified (Ret)
Red	Did not qualify (DNQ)
Red	Did not pre-qualify (DNPQ)
Black	Disqualified (DSQ)
White	Did not start (DNS)
White	Withdrew (WD)
White	Race cancelled (C)
Blank	Did not practice (DNP)
Blank	Did not arrive (DNA)
Blank	Excluded (EX)

**Bold** – Pole
Italics – Fastest Lap
† – Retired, but classified

=== Teams' Championship ===
Pos	Team	Car No.	MNZ (Italy)		ARA (Spain)		MON (Monaco)	SPA (Belgium)		MSC (Russia)		NÜR (Germany)		HUN (Hungary)		LEC (France)		JER (Spain)		Points
1	(France) DAMS	1	**18**	**1**	**1**	4	4	**1**	**1**	14	6	**1**	Ret	4	6	**1**	1	15	11	316
1	(France) DAMS	2	15	11	11	10	**1**	5	5	17	16	12	6	8	1	10	Ret	8	10	316
2	(United Kingdom) Fortec Motorsports	3	7	3	8	Ret	Ret	Ret	Ret	**1**	4	3	4	14	Ret	4	7	3	5	313
2	(United Kingdom) Fortec Motorsports	4	6	10	3	**1**	5	Ret	3	Ret	5	4	Ret	**3**	4	13	3	2	**1**	313
3	(United Kingdom) Arden Motorsport	7	3	5	9	2	7	2	4	18	2	20	8	2	3	2	**2**	6	4	222
3	(United Kingdom) Arden Motorsport	8	4	Ret	Ret	Ret	16	11	12	11	10	Ret	10	19	Ret	17	10	Ret	3	222
4	(Russia) Zeta Corse	21	13	15	17	15	19	13	13	12	Ret	17	13	13	16			11	Ret	183
4	(Russia) Zeta Corse	22	2	9	6	6	9	Ret	16	4	**1**	2	**1**	1	**2**	5	4	Ret	Ret	183
5	(Czech Republic) Lotus	15	14	2	4	Ret	11	9	11	7	11	5	3	15	14	6	13	Ret	9	177
5	(Czech Republic) Lotus	16	17†	16	7	8	Ret	Ret	8	9	3	13	2	5	7	3	6	4	8	177
6	(United Kingdom) Strakka Racing	11	1	Ret	12	3	8	7	2	6	9	11	7	6	10	12	8	**1**	13	162
6	(United Kingdom) Strakka Racing	12	10	12	19	14	13	4	7	8	7	6	Ret	Ret	13	9	17	10	Ret	162
7	(Spain) AVF	19	Ret	17	18	16	17	10	14	13	13	19	Ret	17	12	15	11	5	12	77
7	(Spain) AVF	20	8	13	5	5	6	Ret	Ret	2	8	9	5	Ret	15	11	19	12	14	77
8	(Czech Republic) ISR	17	Ret	7	13	9	3	3	6	5	12	15	9	10	8	Ret	5	14	Ret	73
9	(France) Tech 1 Racing	9	Ret	Ret	15	7	2	8	10	15	15	10	14	7	9	8	Ret	9	Ret	64
9	(France) Tech 1 Racing	10										16	12	Ret	18	16	9	16	2	64
10	(Italy) International Draco Racing	5	11	8	10	12	15	Ret	Ret	3	Ret	7	Ret	Ret	11	Ret	20	Ret	6	60
10	(Italy) International Draco Racing	6	16	4	16	Ret	14	6	Ret	16	14	Ret	15	11	19	7	16	13	Ret	60
11	(United Kingdom) Comtec Racing	27	5	6	2	Ret						18	11	18	17	19	18			38
11	(United Kingdom) Comtec Racing	28					18							9	DNS	14	12			38
12	(Spain) Pons Racing	25	12	14	Ret	13	12	Ret	15	10	17	8	Ret	12	Ret	18	15	Ret	7	32
12	(Spain) Pons Racing	26	9	Ret	14	11	10	12	9	NC	18	14	Ret	16	5	Ret	14	7	15	32
Pos	Team	Car No.	MNZ (Italy)		ARA (Spain)		MON (Monaco)	SPA (Belgium)		MSC (Russia)		NÜR (Germany)		HUN (Hungary)		LEC (France)		JER (Spain)		Points

Colour	Result
Gold	Winner
Silver	Second place
Bronze	Third place
Green	Points classification
Blue	Non-points classification
Blue	Non-classified finish (NC)
Purple	Retired, not classified (Ret)
Red	Did not qualify (DNQ)
Red	Did not pre-qualify (DNPQ)
Black	Disqualified (DSQ)
White	Did not start (DNS)
White	Withdrew (WD)
White	Race cancelled (C)
Blank	Did not practice (DNP)
Blank	Did not arrive (DNA)
Blank	Excluded (EX)

- Polesitter for each race in **bold**. No points were awarded.
- Driver who recorded fastest lap denoted in italics. No points were awarded.
- Driver who retired but was classified denoted by †.
