= 2012 GP2 Series =

Season of Formula One feeder championship

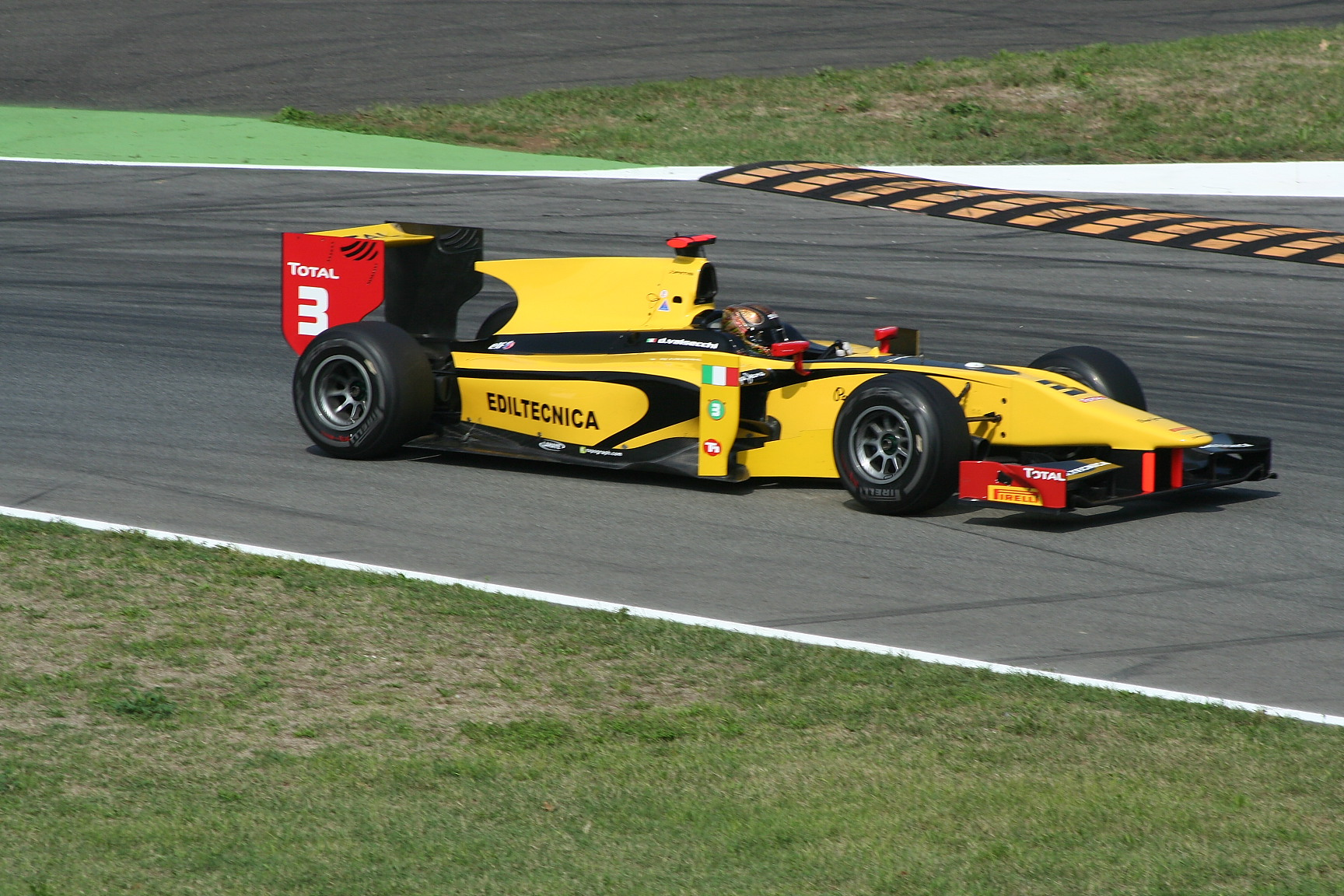
Davide Valsecchi won the Drivers' Championship.

The 2012 GP2 Series season was the forty-sixth season of the second-tier of Formula One feeder championship and also eighth season under the GP2 Series moniker and also the first season after merging with the GP2 Asia Series. The championship was expanded to include rounds in Malaysia, Bahrain and Singapore, in support of the 2012 Formula One season.

The series adopted the points system used by Formula One for the feature race, with points awarded to the top ten drivers and twenty-five points on offer for victory. The points awarded in the sprint race were also changed, with the winner receiving fifteen points and top eight drivers receiving points. Further changes mean that drivers must use two compounds of tyres over a race weekend, as is the case in Formula One. The points awarded for pole position and the fastest lap of the race were doubled as well.

The title was won by Italian Davide Valsecchi, driving for DAMS. After leading in the championship after winning sprint race in Silverstone, Luiz Razia ultimately got to second in the championship after score four victories. Esteban Gutierrez came third with 3 victories and finished just ahead of Max Chilton, who had 2 wins.

== Teams and drivers ==
All teams used the Dallara GP2/11–Mecachrome chassis/engine combination.

Team	No.	Driver name	Rounds
(Spain) Barwa Addax Team	1	(Venezuela) Johnny Cecotto Jr. (Note: Cecotto, Serenelli and González competed under a civil Venezuelan racing licence in rounds 1–3 and a state Venezuelan licence for the rest of the season.)	All
(Spain) Barwa Addax Team	2	(Czech Republic) Josef Král	1, 4–10
(Spain) Barwa Addax Team	2	(Spain) Dani Clos	2–3
(Spain) Barwa Addax Team	2	(United States) Jake Rosenzweig	11–12
(France) DAMS	3	(Italy) Davide Valsecchi	All
(France) DAMS	4	(Brazil) Felipe Nasr	All
(Spain) Racing Engineering	5	(Switzerland) Fabio Leimer	All
(Spain) Racing Engineering	6	(France) Nathanaël Berthon	All
(United Kingdom) iSport International	7	(Sweden) Marcus Ericsson	All
(United Kingdom) iSport International	8	(United Kingdom) Jolyon Palmer	All
(France) Lotus GP (Note: Lotus GP competed under a French licence.)	9	(United Kingdom) James Calado	All
(France) Lotus GP	10	(Mexico) Esteban Gutiérrez	All
(Malaysia) Caterham Racing	11	(Venezuela) Rodolfo González	All
(Malaysia) Caterham Racing	12	(Netherlands) Giedo van der Garde	All
(Italy) Scuderia Coloni	14	(Monaco) Stefano Coletti	1–10
(Italy) Scuderia Coloni	14	(Italy) Luca Filippi	11–12
(Italy) Scuderia Coloni	15	(Italy) Fabio Onidi	All
(Italy) Trident Racing	16	(Monaco) Stéphane Richelmi	All
(Italy) Trident Racing	17	(Colombia) Julián Leal	All
(Italy) Venezuela GP Lazarus (Note: Venezuela GP Lazarus competed under an Italian licence.)	18	(Italy) Fabrizio Crestani	1–7
(Italy) Venezuela GP Lazarus	18	(Spain) Sergio Canamasas	8–12
(Italy) Venezuela GP Lazarus	19	(Venezuela) Giancarlo Serenelli	1–9
(Italy) Venezuela GP Lazarus	19	(Austria) René Binder	10–12
(Italy) Rapax	20	(Portugal) Ricardo Teixeira	1–5, 7–12
(Italy) Rapax	20	(France) Tom Dillmann	6
(Italy) Rapax	21	(France) Tom Dillmann	1–5, 8
(Italy) Rapax	21	(Netherlands) Daniël de Jong	6–7, 9–10
(Italy) Rapax	21	(Monaco) Stefano Coletti	11–12
(United Kingdom) Arden International	22	(Switzerland) Simon Trummer	All
(United Kingdom) Arden International	23	(Brazil) Luiz Razia	All
(Portugal) Ocean Racing Technology	24	(United Kingdom) Jon Lancaster	1
(Portugal) Ocean Racing Technology	24	(New Zealand) Brendon Hartley	2–3
(Portugal) Ocean Racing Technology	24	(Brazil) Victor Guerin	4–12
(Portugal) Ocean Racing Technology	25	(Netherlands) Nigel Melker	All
(United Kingdom) Carlin	26	(United Kingdom) Max Chilton	All
(United Kingdom) Carlin	27	(Indonesia) Rio Haryanto	All

=== Team changes ===
- Carlin Motorsport entered into a partnership with Russian car manufacturer Marussia Motors and Formula One team Marussia F1, forming a similar relationship to their alliance with GP3 Series team Manor Racing.
- After competing as Lotus ART in 2011, ART Grand Prix was renamed as Lotus Grand Prix in both the GP2 and GP3 Series championships, reflecting their increased relationship with title sponsor Lotus Cars. The cars will carry a black and gold livery modelled on the livery used by parent team Lotus F1.
- Team Lazarus replaced Super Nova Racing, using the name "Venezuela GP Lazarus".

=== Driver changes ===
Changed teams

- Ocean Racing Technology's Johnny Cecotto Jr. and Arden International's Josef Král both joined Barwa Addax Team.
- Stefano Coletti switched from Trident Racing to Scuderia Coloni, having driven for the team in the 2011 GP2 Final.
- After competing with Trident, Rodolfo González moved to Caterham.
- Fabio Leimer left Rapax to join Racing Engineering.
- Julián Leal moved from Rapax to Trident Racing, having competed for Trident at the 2011 GP2 Final in Abu Dhabi.
- Jolyon Palmer switched from Arden International to iSport International.
- Luiz Razia and Davide Valsecchi both moved from Caterham Team AirAsia to Arden International and DAMS respectively.
- Giedo van der Garde switched from teams' champions Barwa Addax Team to Caterham Racing; he also joined parent team Caterham F1 as test and reserve driver.

Entering/Re-entering GP2 Series

- French driver Nathanaël Berthon, who finished 13th in the Formula Renault 3.5 Series, joined Racing Engineering.
- After finishing runner-up in the GP3 Series with Lotus ART, British driver James Calado joined the Lotus ART GP2 squadron, replacing Jules Bianchi.
- After competing at three rounds in 2010 with David Price Racing, Fabrizio Crestani returned to the series with Venezuela GP Lazarus, the team for which he competed in Auto GP.
- Tom Dillmann, who finished 14th in the GP3 Series, joined Rapax. Dillmann competed for iSport at the 2011 GP2 Final in Abu Dhabi.
- Rio Haryanto, who finished seventh in both the GP3 Series and Auto GP in 2011, joined Marussia Carlin. Haryanto competed for DAMS at the 2011 GP2 Final in Abu Dhabi.
- Auto GP race winner Jon Lancaster signed with Ocean Racing Technology.
- Dutch driver Nigel Melker, who finished third in the GP3 Series, joined Ocean Racing Technology. Melker had previously competed in the 2011 GP2 Final with DAMS.
- British Formula 3 champion Felipe Nasr joined DAMS for 2012.
- Italian Fabio Onidi, who finished fifth in Auto GP, signed with Scuderia Coloni. He competed in the 2011 GP2 Final with Super Nova Racing.
- Venezuelan Giancarlo Serenelli, a three-time LATAM Challenge Series champion, joined Venezuela GP Lazarus.
- Ricardo Teixeira, who competed in GP2 in 2009 with Trident Racing, returned to the series with Rapax.
- After competing for MW Arden in the GP3 Series, Swiss driver Simon Trummer joined Arden's GP2 team for 2012.

Leaving GP2

- Part-time Carlin driver and 2010 Formula Renault 3.5 Series champion Mikhail Aleshin returned to Formula Renault 3.5 with Team RFR.
- After competing in two seasons with ART Grand Prix, Jules Bianchi moved to the Formula Renault 3.5 Series with Tech 1 Racing whilst serving as Force India's third driver for the 2012 Formula One season.
- Sam Bird, who drove for iSport in 2011, also switched to the Formula Renault 3.5 Series, joining the ISR team.
- After a partial campaign for Scuderia Coloni, Kevin Ceccon left the GP2 Series to debut in the GP3 Series with Ocean Racing Technology.
- Reigning champion Romain Grosjean returned to Formula One with Lotus.
- Álvaro Parente, who competed for Racing Engineering and Carlin Motorsport in 2011, joined the GT World Championship, driving for Hexis Racing.
- Barwa Addax driver Charles Pic moved into Formula One, signing a contract with Marussia F1.
- DAMS driver Pål Varhaug left the championship to compete in the 2012 Auto GP World Series.
- Two-time 2011 race-winner Christian Vietoris elected to concentrate on his DTM programme, joining the junior Mercedes scheme, earning a place in the HWA Team.

Mid-season changes

- René Binder replaced Giancarlo Serenelli in the Lazarus team for the tenth round of the championship, held at Spa-Francorchamps.
- Sergio Canamasas replaced Venezuela GP Lazarus' Fabrizio Crestani for the Hockenheim round of the championship.
- Dani Clos replaced Josef Král at the Barwa Addax Team for the Bahrain rounds of the championship. No explanation was given for the replacement. Král returned to the seat in Montmeló after Clos drove for HRT F1 in the first practice session of the Grand Prix; under the rules of the GP2 Series, no driver who takes part in a Grand Prix weekend is permitted to drive in the event's GP2 support races.
- In the week before the penultimate round of the championship at Monza, Scuderia Coloni announced that Stefano Coletti would be leaving the team with immediate effect as "season objectives" had not been met. Luca Filippi, who drove for the team when finished runner-up in 2011, was announced as Coletti's replacement. Coletti later joined Rapax, replacing Daniël de Jong.
- Brendon Hartley replaced Jon Lancaster at Ocean Racing Technology for the Bahrain rounds of the championship, for budgetary reasons. For the Catalunya round of the championship, Hartley was replaced by Victor Guerin.
- Daniël de Jong joined Rapax for the Valencia round after regular driver Ricardo Teixeira was taken ill. Tom Dillmann was moved to Teixeira's car to represent Teixeira's sponsors, while de Jong drove Dillmann's vacated car. Teixeira returned to his car for the Silverstone round, with de Jong replacing Dillmann; Dillmann rejoined the team in his original car for Hockenheim, before sitting out the remainder of the season.
- Jake Rosenzweig replaced Josef Král at the Barwa Addax Team for the penultimate round of the season at Monza.

== 2012 schedule ==
The calendar for the 2012 series was unveiled on 16 December 2011. The calendar was expanded to twelve rounds, featuring new races in Malaysia, Singapore, and Bahrain. The championship featured twenty-four races, a record high for the series.

Round		Circuit/Location	Country	Date	Supporting
1	F	Sepang International Circuit, Sepang	Malaysia	24 March	Malaysian Grand Prix
1	S	Sepang International Circuit, Sepang	Malaysia	25 March	Malaysian Grand Prix
2	F	Bahrain International Circuit, Sakhir	Bahrain	21 April	Bahrain Grand Prix
2	S	Bahrain International Circuit, Sakhir	Bahrain	22 April	Bahrain Grand Prix
3	F	Bahrain International Circuit, Sakhir	Bahrain	27 April	stand-alone round
3	S	Bahrain International Circuit, Sakhir	Bahrain	28 April	stand-alone round
4	F	Circuit de Catalunya, Montmeló	Spain	12 May	Spanish Grand Prix
4	S	Circuit de Catalunya, Montmeló	Spain	13 May	Spanish Grand Prix
5	F	Circuit de Monaco, Monaco	Monaco	25 May	Monaco Grand Prix
5	S	Circuit de Monaco, Monaco	Monaco	26 May	Monaco Grand Prix
6	F	Valencia Street Circuit, Valencia	Spain	23 June	European Grand Prix
6	S	Valencia Street Circuit, Valencia	Spain	24 June	European Grand Prix
7	F	Silverstone Circuit, Silverstone	United Kingdom	7 July	British Grand Prix
7	S	Silverstone Circuit, Silverstone	United Kingdom	8 July	British Grand Prix
8	F	Hockenheimring, Hockenheim	Germany	21 July	German Grand Prix
8	S	Hockenheimring, Hockenheim	Germany	22 July	German Grand Prix
9	F	Hungaroring, Mogyoród	Hungary	28 July	Hungarian Grand Prix
9	S	Hungaroring, Mogyoród	Hungary	29 July	Hungarian Grand Prix
10	F	Circuit de Spa-Francorchamps, Stavelot	Belgium	1 September	Belgian Grand Prix
10	S	Circuit de Spa-Francorchamps, Stavelot	Belgium	2 September	Belgian Grand Prix
11	F	Monza Circuit, Monza	Italy	8 September	Italian Grand Prix
11	S	Monza Circuit, Monza	Italy	9 September	Italian Grand Prix
12	F	Marina Bay Street Circuit, Singapore	Singapore	22 September	Singapore Grand Prix
12	S	Marina Bay Street Circuit, Singapore	Singapore	23 September	Singapore Grand Prix

=== Calendar changes ===
- The series travelled to Malaysia in support of the 2012 Malaysian Grand Prix. The GP2 Asia Series had previously visited the circuit during the 2008–09 season.
- The series also supported the 2012 Bahrain Grand Prix on the weekend of 22 April, with an independent round of the championship also taking place at the circuit during the following week.
- The series travelled to Singapore for the first time in its history, supporting the 2012 Singapore Grand Prix.
- The round at Istanbul Park was removed from the calendar after the Turkish Grand Prix was discontinued.
- The round at Yas Marina Circuit was also discontinued.
- The venue hosting the round in Germany followed the German Grand Prix from the Nürburgring to Hockenheim.

== Results ==
Round		Circuit	Pole position	Fastest lap	Winning driver	Winning team	Report
1	F	(Malaysia) Sepang International Circuit	(Italy) Davide Valsecchi	(Italy) Davide Valsecchi	(Brazil) Luiz Razia	(United Kingdom) Arden International	Report
1	S	(Malaysia) Sepang International Circuit		(Italy) Fabrizio Crestani (Note: Fabrizio Crestani set the fastest lap, but did not finish in the top 10, so was ineligible to be the point-scorer for the fastest lap. Rio Haryanto was the point-scorer instead for setting the fastest lap of those finishing in the top 10.)	(United Kingdom) James Calado	(France) Lotus GP	Report
2	F	Bahrain International Circuit	(Italy) Davide Valsecchi	(Italy) Davide Valsecchi	(Italy) Davide Valsecchi	(France) DAMS	Report
2	S	Bahrain International Circuit		(Netherlands) Giedo van der Garde	(Italy) Davide Valsecchi	(France) DAMS	Report
3	F	Bahrain International Circuit	(Netherlands) Giedo van der Garde	(United Kingdom) James Calado (Note: James Calado set the fastest lap, but did not finish in the top 10, so was ineligible to be the point-scorer for the fastest lap. Davide Valsecchi was the point-scorer instead for setting the fastest lap of those finishing in the top 10.)	(Italy) Davide Valsecchi	(France) DAMS	Report
3	S	Bahrain International Circuit		(United Kingdom) Jolyon Palmer (Note: Jolyon Palmer set the fastest lap, but did not finish in the top 10, so was ineligible to be the point-scorer for the fastest lap. Luiz Razia was the point-scorer instead for setting the fastest lap of those finishing in the top 10.)	(France) Tom Dillmann	(Italy) Rapax	Report
4	F	(Spain) Circuit de Catalunya	(United Kingdom) James Calado	(Mexico) Esteban Gutiérrez	(Netherlands) Giedo van der Garde	(Malaysia) Caterham Racing	Report
4	S	(Spain) Circuit de Catalunya		(Brazil) Victor Guerin (Note: Victor Guerin set the fastest lap, but did not finish in the top 10, so was ineligible to be the point-scorer for the fastest lap. Luiz Razia was the point-scorer instead for setting the fastest lap of those finishing in the top 10.)	(Brazil) Luiz Razia	(United Kingdom) Arden International	Report
5	F	Circuit de Monaco	(Venezuela) Johnny Cecotto Jr.	(Monaco) Stefano Coletti	(Venezuela) Johnny Cecotto Jr.	(Spain) Barwa Addax Team	Report
5	S	Circuit de Monaco		(Brazil) Luiz Razia	(United Kingdom) Jolyon Palmer	(United Kingdom) iSport International	Report
6	F	(Spain) Valencia Street Circuit	(United Kingdom) James Calado	(Mexico) Esteban Gutiérrez	(Mexico) Esteban Gutiérrez	(France) Lotus GP	Report
6	S	(Spain) Valencia Street Circuit		(Brazil) Felipe Nasr (Note: Felipe Nasr set the fastest lap, but did not finish in the top 10, so was ineligible to be the point-scorer for the fastest lap. Fabio Leimer was the point-scorer instead for setting the fastest lap of those finishing in the top 10.)	(Brazil) Luiz Razia	(United Kingdom) Arden International	Report
7	F	(United Kingdom) Silverstone Circuit	(Switzerland) Fabio Leimer	(Mexico) Esteban Gutiérrez	(Mexico) Esteban Gutiérrez	(France) Lotus GP	Report
7	S	(United Kingdom) Silverstone Circuit		(Colombia) Julián Leal (Note: Julián Leal set the fastest lap, but did not finish in the top 10, so was ineligible to be the point-scorer for the fastest lap. Marcus Ericsson was the point-scorer instead for setting the fastest lap of those finishing in the top 10.)	(Brazil) Luiz Razia	(United Kingdom) Arden International	Report
8	F	(Germany) Hockenheimring	(Netherlands) Giedo van der Garde	(Italy) Fabio Onidi (Note: Fabio Onidi set the fastest lap, but did not finish in the top 10, so was ineligible to be the point-scorer for the fastest lap. Johnny Cecotto Jr. was the point-scorer instead for setting the fastest lap of those finishing in the top 10.)	(Venezuela) Johnny Cecotto Jr.	(Spain) Barwa Addax Team	Report
8	S	(Germany) Hockenheimring		(Monaco) Stéphane Richelmi (Note: Stéphane Richelmi set the fastest lap, but did not finish in the top 10, so was ineligible to be the point-scorer for the fastest lap. James Calado was the point-scorer instead for setting the fastest lap of those finishing in the top 10.)	(United Kingdom) James Calado	(France) Lotus GP	Report
9	F	(Hungary) Hungaroring	(United Kingdom) Max Chilton	(Switzerland) Simon Trummer (Note: Simon Trummer set the fastest lap, but did not finish in the top 10, so was ineligible to be the point-scorer for the fastest lap. Davide Valsecchi was the point-scorer instead for setting the fastest lap of those finishing in the top 10.)	(United Kingdom) Max Chilton	(United Kingdom) Carlin	Report
9	S	(Hungary) Hungaroring		(Mexico) Esteban Gutiérrez	(Mexico) Esteban Gutiérrez	(France) Lotus GP	Report
10	F	(Belgium) Circuit de Spa-Francorchamps	(Indonesia) Rio Haryanto	(Mexico) Esteban Gutiérrez (Note: Esteban Gutiérrez set the fastest lap, but did not finish in the top 10, so was ineligible to be the point-scorer for the fastest lap. Giedo van der Garde was the point-scorer instead for setting the fastest lap of those finishing in the top 10.)	(Sweden) Marcus Ericsson	(United Kingdom) iSport International	Report
10	S	(Belgium) Circuit de Spa-Francorchamps		(United Kingdom) Max Chilton (Note: Max Chilton set the fastest lap, but did not finish in the top 10, so was ineligible to be the point-scorer for the fastest lap. Stefano Coletti was the point-scorer instead for setting the fastest lap of those finishing in the top 10.)	(Czech Republic) Josef Král	(Spain) Barwa Addax Team	Report
11	F	(Italy) Monza Circuit	(United Kingdom) Max Chilton	(Switzerland) Fabio Leimer	(Italy) Luca Filippi	(Italy) Scuderia Coloni	Report
11	S	(Italy) Monza Circuit		(Italy) Luca Filippi (Note: Luca Filippi set the fastest lap, but did not finish in the top 10, so was ineligible to be the point-scorer for the fastest lap. Davide Valsecchi was the point-scorer instead for setting the fastest lap of those finishing in the top 10.)	(Italy) Davide Valsecchi	(France) DAMS	Report
12	F	(Singapore) Marina Bay Street Circuit	(Italy) Luca Filippi	(Italy) Luca Filippi (Note: Luca Filippi set the fastest lap, but did not finish in the top 10, so was ineligible to be the point-scorer for the fastest lap. Esteban Gutiérrez was the point-scorer instead for setting the fastest lap of those finishing in the top 10.)	(United Kingdom) Max Chilton	(United Kingdom) Carlin	Report
12	S	(Singapore) Marina Bay Street Circuit		(France) Nathanaël Berthon (Note: Nathanaël Berthon set the fastest lap, but did not finish in the top 10, so was ineligible to be the point-scorer for the fastest lap. Stefano Coletti was the point-scorer instead for setting the fastest lap of those finishing in the top 10.)	(Netherlands) Giedo van der Garde	(Malaysia) Caterham Racing	Report

== Championship standings ==
Scoring system

Points were awarded to the top 10 classified finishers in the Feature race, and to the top 8 classified finishers in the Sprint race. The pole-sitter in the feature race also received four points, and two points were given to the driver who set the fastest lap inside the top ten in both the feature and sprint races. No extra points were awarded to the pole-sitter in the sprint race.

Feature race points

Position	**1st**	**2nd**	**3rd**	**4th**	**5th**	**6th**	**7th**	**8th**	**9th**	**10th**	**Pole**	**FL**
Points	25	18	15	12	10	8	6	4	2	1	4	2

Sprint race points

Points were awarded to the top 8 classified finishers.

Position	**1st**	**2nd**	**3rd**	**4th**	**5th**	**6th**	**7th**	**8th**	**FL**
Points	15	12	10	8	6	4	2	1	2

=== Drivers' Championship ===
Pos	Driver	SEP (Malaysia)		BHR1 (Bahrain)		BHR2 (Bahrain)		CAT (Spain)		MON (Monaco)		VAL (Spain)		SIL (United Kingdom)		HOC (Germany)		HUN (Hungary)		SPA (Belgium)		MNZ (Italy)		MRN (Singapore)		Points
1	(Italy) Davide Valsecchi	**2**	Ret	**1**	1	1	3	4	3	4	Ret	18	10	7	2	13	7	2	4	3	Ret	6	1	4	5	247
2	(Brazil) Luiz Razia	1	5	2	4	4	2	8	1	15	6	3	1	5	1	7	10	3	3	6	20	Ret	16	5	4	222
3	(Mexico) Esteban Gutiérrez	7	2	3	2	10	4	10	7	23†	8	1	Ret	1	4	10	5	8	1	11	13	9	Ret	2	6	176
4	(United Kingdom) Max Chilton	3	7	4	5	5	13	7	5	5	2	7	4	9	19†	14	Ret	**1**	11	12	22	**4**	6	1	19	169
5	(United Kingdom) James Calado	8	1	5	3	16	12	**2**	4	7	Ret	**8**	2	Ret	20†	8	1	4	6	2	3	12	14	Ret	10	160
6	(Netherlands) Giedo van der Garde	9	4	Ret	9	**3**	19	1	6	3	3	11	6	8	21†	**5**	2	5	10	5	21	Ret	10	8	1	160
7	(Switzerland) Fabio Leimer	4	6	7	12	2	8	12	11	18	Ret	4	3	**14**	9	2	4	9	14	Ret	5	5	2	3	3	152
8	(Sweden) Marcus Ericsson	13	Ret	13	16	7	7	13	22	2	4	2	Ret	21	7	11	15	18	Ret	1	4	3	7	7	2	124
9	(Venezuela) Johnny Cecotto Jr.	Ret	22	Ret	22†	9	Ret	18	13	**1**	Ret	DSQ	Ret	2	18†	1	6	Ret	Ret	17	Ret	2	5	Ret	9	104
10	(Brazil) Felipe Nasr	6	3	Ret	6	11	5	11	9	17	Ret	Ret	14	6	3	4	3	25†	8	8	2	Ret	21	6	7	95
11	(United Kingdom) Jolyon Palmer	17	12	DNS	7	24†	22	9	DNS	6	1	Ret	Ret	3	5	18	18	6	5	Ret	10	7	3	Ret	Ret	78
12	(France) Nathanaël Berthon	11	8	21†	Ret	12	10	5	2	9	7	6	5	12	14	15	9	7	2	14	19	15	15	10	15	60
13	(Monaco) Stefano Coletti	5	23†	Ret	23†	21	18	3	8	10	Ret	9	Ret	Ret	Ret	20	19	10	9	20†	8	8	4	13	8	50
14	(Indonesia) Rio Haryanto	12	10	9	15	6	6	16	15	14	11	5	Ret	10	12	17	11	12	7	**10**	7	19	12	9	11	38
15	(France) Tom Dillmann	18	11	6	10	8	1	22	12	11	Ret	Ret	12			9	Ret									29
16	(Italy) Luca Filippi																					1	22	**Ret**	DNS	29
17	(Czech Republic) Josef Král	14	9					20	16	Ret	10	DSQ	11	16	10	12	13	24†	17	4	1					27
18	(Monaco) Stéphane Richelmi	19	19	11	Ret	17	17	21	19	8	Ret	14	Ret	13	Ret	3	21	17	21	9	6	13	9	14	22†	25
19	(Netherlands) Nigel Melker	16	14	20†	18	19	11	14	24	Ret	12	Ret	13	4	6	6	8	14	18	Ret	DNS	11	Ret	12	12	25
20	(Italy) Fabio Onidi	20	13	8	14	20	9	6	18	Ret	Ret	13	17	22	8	19	22	11	24	16	12	21	Ret	Ret	20	13
21	(Colombia) Julián Leal	15	15	12	17	15	14	24	17	21	Ret	12	8	20	17	21	12	16	15	7	9	10	8	11	16	9
22	(Venezuela) Rodolfo González	Ret	18	15	21	18	15	15	14	13	5	15	15	23	Ret	23	20	23	16	Ret	14	22	20	Ret	18	6
23	(Switzerland) Simon Trummer	23	16	16	8	14	24†	23	20	12	9	10	7	15	11	16	17	13	13	15	16	16	17	Ret	14	4
24	(Italy) Fabrizio Crestani	10	21	14	19	Ret	23	17	10	19	Ret	Ret	DNS	11	22†											1
25	(New Zealand) Brendon Hartley			10	Ret	13	16																			1
26	(Netherlands) Daniël de Jong											16	9	Ret	13			15	19	13	11					0
27	(Spain) Sergio Canamasas															22	14	22	12	Ret	Ret	14	11	16	DSQ	0
28	(Spain) Dani Clos			19†	11	Ret	Ret																			0
29	(Portugal) Ricardo Teixeira	21	24†	17	13	23	20	Ret	23	20	Ret			18	15	DSQ	16	19	20	18	15	20	18	17	21	0
30	(Brazil) Victor Guerin							19	21	16	Ret	17	18	17	DNS	Ret	23	21	23	Ret	18	23	Ret	Ret	13	0
31	(Austria) René Binder																			19	17	17	13	Ret	Ret	0
32	(United States) Jake Rosenzweig																					18	19	15	17	0
33	(Venezuela) Giancarlo Serenelli	22	20	18	20	22	21	25	Ret	22	Ret	Ret	16	19	16	24	Ret	20	22							0
34	(United Kingdom) Jon Lancaster	Ret	17																							0
Pos	Driver	SEP (Malaysia)		BHR1 (Bahrain)		BHR2 (Bahrain)		CAT (Spain)		MON (Monaco)		VAL (Spain)		SIL (United Kingdom)		HOC (Germany)		HUN (Hungary)		SPA (Belgium)		MNZ (Italy)		MRN (Singapore)		Points

Key
Colour	Result
Gold	Winner
Silver	2nd place
Bronze	3rd place
Green	Other points position
Blue	Other classified position
Blue	Not classified, finished (NC)
Purple	Not classified, retired (Ret)
Red	Did not qualify (DNQ)
Red	Did not pre-qualify (DNPQ)
Black	Disqualified (DSQ)
White	Did not start (DNS)
White	Race cancelled (C)
Blank	Did not practice (DNP)
Blank	Excluded (EX)
Blank	Did not arrive (DNA)
Blank	Withdrawn (WD)
Text formatting	Meaning
**Bold**	Pole position point(s)
Italics	Fastest lap point(s)

Notes:

- † — Drivers did not finish the race, but were classified as they completed over 90% of the race distance.

=== Teams' Championship ===
Pos	Team	Car No.	SEP (Malaysia)		BHR1 (Bahrain)		BHR2 (Bahrain)		CAT (Spain)		MON (Monaco)		VAL (Note: Barwa Addax Team were disqualified from the Feature race in Valencia due to a technical infringement.) (Spain)		SIL (United Kingdom)		HOC (Germany)		HUN (Hungary)		SPA (Belgium)		MNZ (Italy)		MRN (Singapore)		Points
1	(France) DAMS	3	**2**	Ret	**1**	1	1	3	4	3	4	Ret	18	10	7	2	13	7	2	4	3	Ret	6	1	4	5	342
1	(France) DAMS	4	6	3	Ret	6	11	5	11	9	17	Ret	Ret	14	6	3	4	3	25†	8	8	2	Ret	21	6	7	342
2	(France) Lotus GP	9	8	1	5	3	16	12	**2**	4	7	Ret	**8**	2	Ret	20†	8	1	4	6	2	3	12	14	Ret	10	336
2	(France) Lotus GP	10	7	2	3	2	10	4	10	7	23†	8	1	Ret	1	4	10	5	8	1	11	13	9	Ret	2	6	336
3	(United Kingdom) Arden International	22	23	16	16	8	14	24†	23	20	12	9	10	7	15	11	16	17	13	13	15	16	16	17	Ret	14	226
3	(United Kingdom) Arden International	23	1	5	2	4	4	2	8	1	15	6	3	1	5	1	7	10	3	3	6	20	Ret	16	5	4	226
4	(Spain) Racing Engineering	5	4	6	7	12	2	8	12	11	18	Ret	4	3	**14**	9	2	4	9	14	Ret	5	5	2	3	3	212
4	(Spain) Racing Engineering	6	11	8	21†	Ret	12	10	5	2	9	7	6	5	12	14	15	9	7	2	14	19	15	15	10	15	212
5	(United Kingdom) Carlin	26	3	7	4	5	5	13	7	5	5	2	7	4	9	19†	14	Ret	**1**	11	12	22	**4**	6	1	19	207
5	(United Kingdom) Carlin	27	12	10	9	15	6	6	16	15	14	11	5	Ret	10	12	17	11	12	7	**10**	7	19	12	9	11	207
6	(United Kingdom) iSport International	7	13	Ret	13	16	7	7	13	22	2	4	2	Ret	21	7	11	15	18	Ret	1	4	3	7	7	2	202
6	(United Kingdom) iSport International	8	17	12	DNS	7	24†	22	9	DNS	6	1	Ret	Ret	3	5	18	18	6	5	Ret	10	7	3	Ret	Ret	202
7	(Malaysia) Caterham Racing	11	Ret	18	15	21	18	15	15	14	13	5	15	15	23	Ret	23	20	23	16	Ret	14	22	20	Ret	14	166
7	(Malaysia) Caterham Racing	12	9	4	Ret	9	**3**	19	1	6	3	3	11	6	8	21†	**5**	2	5	10	5	21	Ret	10	8	1	166
8	(Spain) Barwa Addax Team	1	Ret	22	Ret	22†	9	Ret	18	13	**1**	Ret	DSQ	Ret	2	18†	1	6	Ret	Ret	17	Ret	2	5	Ret	9	131
8	(Spain) Barwa Addax Team	2	14	9	19†	11	Ret	Ret	20	16	Ret	10	DSQ	11	16	10	12	13	24†	17	4	1	18	19	15	17	131
9	(Italy) Rapax	20	21	24†	17	13	23	20	Ret	23	20	Ret	Ret	12	18	15	DSQ	16	19	20	18	15	20	18	17	21	44
9	(Italy) Rapax	21	18	11	6	10	8	1	22	12	11	Ret	16	9	Ret	13	9	Ret	15	19	13	11	8	4	13	8	44
10	(Italy) Trident Racing	16	19	19	11	Ret	17	17	21	19	8	Ret	14	Ret	13	Ret	3	21	17	21	9	6	13	9	14	22†	34
10	(Italy) Trident Racing	17	15	15	12	17	15	14	24	17	21	Ret	12	8	20	17	17	12	16	15	7	9	10	8	11	16	34
11	(Portugal) Ocean Racing Technology	24	Ret	17	10	Ret	13	16	19	21	16	Ret	17	18	17	DNS	Ret	23	21	23	Ret	18	23	Ret	Ret	13	26
11	(Portugal) Ocean Racing Technology	25	16	14	20†	18	19	11	14	24	Ret	12	Ret	13	4	6	6	8	14	18	Ret	DNS	11	Ret	12	12	26
12	(Italy) Venezuela GP Lazarus	18	10	21	14	19	Ret	23	17	10	19	Ret	Ret	DNS	11	22†	22	14	22	12	Ret	Ret	14	11	16	DSQ	1
12	(Italy) Venezuela GP Lazarus	19	22	20	18	20	22	21	25	Ret	22	Ret	Ret	16	19	16	24	Ret	20	22	19	17	17	13	Ret	Ret	1
—	(Italy) Scuderia Coloni	14	5	23†	Ret	23†	21	18	3	8	10	Ret	9	Ret	Ret	Ret	20	19	10	9	20†	8	1	22	**Ret**	DNS	0 (Note: Following what the team described as a "disagreement" between the team and series organisers, Scuderia Coloni announced its intentions to leave the GP2 Series at the end of the 2012 season, and formally forfeited all of the points it had received to date and would receive for the remainder of the season.)
—	(Italy) Scuderia Coloni	15	20	13	8	14	20	9	6	18	Ret	Ret	13	17	22	8	19	22	11	24	16	12	21	Ret	Ret	20	0
Pos	Team	Car No.	SEP (Malaysia)		BHR1 (Bahrain)		BHR2 (Bahrain)		CAT (Spain)		MON (Monaco)		VAL (Spain)		SIL (United Kingdom)		HOC (Germany)		HUN (Hungary)		SPA (Belgium)		MNZ (Italy)		MRN (Singapore)		Points

Notes:

- † — Drivers did not finish the race, but were classified as they completed over 90% of the race distance.
