= 2012 Formula Renault 3.5 Series =

Car racing series

Seasons
- ← 2011 2013 →

The 2012 Formula Renault 3.5 Series was the eighth season of the Renault–supported single–seater category.

It was the first season for the new Dallara T12 chassis, which featured a new, 530 bhp (400 kW) V8 engine supplied by British firm Zytek Motorsport. The car also featured a new gearbox developed by Ricardo and a Drag Reduction System similar to the one first used in the 2011 Formula One season. The series' organising committee has also announced that the series' sporting regulations were set to remain unchanged.

Robin Frijns won the championship in his first season of competition, becoming the first driver since Robert Kubica in 2005 to win the Formula Renault 3.5 Series in his debut year. Tech 1 Racing won the teams' championship for the fourth time.

== Teams and drivers ==
On 10 October 2011, it was announced that 18 teams had applied to compete in the 2012 season. Twelve of the thirteen teams that competed in 2011 submitted entries, while Mofaz Racing withdrew after failing to acquire the requisite funds to continue in the series. Several new teams, including Arden International, Atech Reid GP, DAMS, Koiranen Motorsport, Max Travin Racing Team – however prior the start of the season, Max Travin Racing Team joined forces with BVM Target as part of a three-year partnership – and Van Amersfoort Racing all submitted entries to join the series. The final list of thirteen teams was published on 17 October 2011, with GP2 Series teams Arden International and DAMS selected to join, while EPIC Racing and Koiranen Motorsport were placed on a reserve list.

Team	No.	Driver name	Status	Rounds
(United Kingdom) Carlin	1	(Denmark) Kevin Magnussen	R	All
(United Kingdom) Carlin	2	(United Kingdom) Will Stevens	R	All
(United Kingdom) Fortec Motorsports	3	(Colombia) Carlos Huertas	R	All
(United Kingdom) Fortec Motorsports	4	(Netherlands) Robin Frijns	R	All
(Czech Republic) ISR	5	(United Kingdom) Sam Bird		All
(Czech Republic) ISR	6	(United States) Jake Rosenzweig		All
(France) Tech 1 Racing	7	(Estonia) Kevin Korjus		1–6
(France) Tech 1 Racing	7	(Germany) Daniel Abt	R	7–9
(France) Tech 1 Racing	8	(France) Jules Bianchi		All
(United Kingdom) P1 Motorsport	9	(Austria) Walter Grubmüller		All
(United Kingdom) P1 Motorsport	10	(Russia) Daniil Move		All
(Czech Republic) Lotus	11	(New Zealand) Richie Stanaway	R	1–3
(Czech Republic) Lotus	11	(Brazil) César Ramos		4–5
(Czech Republic) Lotus	11	(Netherlands) Nigel Melker		6
(Czech Republic) Lotus	11	(Estonia) Kevin Korjus		7–9
(Czech Republic) Lotus	12	(Denmark) Marco Sørensen	R	All
(Italy) BVM Target	15	(Italy) Giovanni Venturini	R	1–4
(Italy) BVM Target	15	(Russia) Sergey Sirotkin	R	5
(Italy) BVM Target	15	(Italy) Daniel Zampieri		6
(Italy) BVM Target	15	(Hungary) Tamás Pál Kiss	R	7, 9
(Italy) BVM Target	15	(Italy) Davide Rigon	R	8
(Italy) BVM Target	16	(Russia) Nikolay Martsenko	R	All
(Russia) Team RFR	17	(Russia) Mikhail Aleshin		All
(Russia) Team RFR	18	(Russia) Anton Nebylitskiy		1–6
(Russia) Team RFR	18	(Finland) Aaro Vainio	R	7–9
(Spain) Pons Racing	19	(Brazil) Yann Cunha	R	All
(Spain) Pons Racing	20	(Switzerland) Zoël Amberg	R	All
(Italy) International Draco Racing	21	(Switzerland) Nico Müller	R	All
(Italy) International Draco Racing	22	(Brazil) André Negrão		All
(United Kingdom) Comtec Racing	23	(Italy) Vittorio Ghirelli	R	All
(United Kingdom) Comtec Racing	24	(United Kingdom) Nick Yelloly		All
(United Kingdom) Arden Caterham	25	(United States) Alexander Rossi		All
(United Kingdom) Arden Caterham	26	(United Kingdom) Lewis Williamson		1–3
(United Kingdom) Arden Caterham	26	(Portugal) António Félix da Costa	R	4–9
(France) DAMS	27	(Brazil) Lucas Foresti	R	All
(France) DAMS	28	(France) Arthur Pic		All

=== Driver changes ===
Changed teams

- Arthur Pic switched from Tech 1 Racing to newcomers DAMS for the 2012 campaign.
- Jake Rosenzweig moved from Mofaz Racing to join ISR for the 2012 season.
- Alexander Rossi, who finished third in the 2011 season for Fortec Motorsports, moved to the new team Arden Caterham for the 2012 campaign.

Entering/Re–Entering FR3.5

- 2010 champion Mikhail Aleshin, who competed in the GP2 Series and German Formula Three in 2011, returned to the series full-time with Team RFR, after a one-off appearance at the Hungaroring in 2011, replacing Anton Nebylitskiy. Nebylitskiy partners Aleshin at Team RFR in 2012.
- Zoël Amberg, who competed in the 2011 GP3 Series season with ATECH CRS GP, moved to Formula Renault 3.5, joining Pons Racing.
- Jules Bianchi, who finished third in the GP2 Series in both 2010 and 2011, joined Tech 1 Racing. He also competed in the Monaco round of the series in 2009 for SG Formula.
- Sam Bird, who was sixth in GP2 in 2011, also joined the series with ISR.
- Yann Cunha, who participated in both British Formula 3 and the European F3 Open championships in 2011, joined Amberg at Pons Racing.
- Lucas Foresti, who graduated from the British Formula 3 Championship, joined Arthur Pic at DAMS.
- Colombian driver Carlos Huertas, who placed third in the British Formula 3 championship and fifth in the Macau Grand Prix, will move into the series, driving for Fortec Motorsport. Eurocup Formula Renault 2.0 champion Robin Frijns became his teammate.
- British Formula 3 runner-up Kevin Magnussen continued his collaboration with Carlin Motorsport for another season, joining the team's Formula Renault 3.5 outfit. He was joined in the team by Will Stevens, who placed fourth in the Formula Renault Eurocup in 2011.
- Nikolay Martsenko, who finished twelfth in German Formula Three in 2011, moved into the series with BVM Target.
- Lotus signed German Formula Three champion Richie Stanaway and runner-up Marco Sørensen to drive their cars in 2012.
- Auto GP race-winner Giovanni Venturini joined Martsenko at BVM Target.
- GP3 Series race-winner Lewis Williamson moved into the series full-time, after replacing Daniel Ricciardo at ISR for two meetings in 2011. He joined Formula Renault 3.5 debutants Arden Caterham. Fellow GP3 race-winner Nico Müller joined the series with International Draco Racing.
- GP3 racer Nick Yelloly, who competed in three meetings for Pons Racing in 2011, moved into the series full-time with Comtec Racing. He will be joined by fellow GP3 driver Vittorio Ghirelli.

Leaving FR3.5

- Nathanaël Berthon, who raced for ISR in 2011, stepped up to GP2 with Racing Engineering, having previously contested the 2011 GP2 Asia Series season and GP2 Final with the team.
- Albert Costa, who finished fourth in 2011 with EPIC Racing, will move to the Eurocup Mégane Trophy with defending champions Oregon Team.
- Daniël de Jong, who finished 29th for Comtec Racing, joined the Auto GP World Series full-time with Manor MP Motorsport, having contested three meetings for the team during the 2011 season.
- Daniel McKenzie, who raced for Comtec Racing in 2011, will move to Formula Two for 2012.
- Sten Pentus, who finished 24th in 2011 with EPIC Racing, will move to the Auto GP World Series with the Virtuosi UK team.
- After finishing in fifth place in the series, alongside a half season in Formula One, Daniel Ricciardo switched to Formula One full-time, joining Scuderia Toro Rosso.
- Stéphane Richelmi, who finished 26th in the 2011 season for Draco Racing, will graduate to the GP2 Series with Trident Racing.
- Filip Salaquarda, who entered at Monza with Pons Racing in 2011, will switch to the FIA GT1 World Championship, joining AF Corse.
- Adrien Tambay, who competed for Pons Racing and Draco Racing in 2011, will join the DTM, driving for Abt Sportsline.
- Mofaz Racing driver Chris van der Drift left the championship to compete in the Auto GP World Series.
- 2011 series runner-up Jean-Éric Vergne moved into Formula One with Scuderia Toro Rosso.
- Oliver Webb, who drove for Pons Racing in 2011, will move to the Indy Lights series full-time with Sam Schmidt Motorsports, having contested four races with Jensen MotorSport in 2011.
- 2011 champion Robert Wickens switched to the DTM, joining the junior Mercedes scheme, earning a place at Mücke Motorsport.
- BVM Target driver Daniel Zampieri switched to sportscar racing, joining the International GT Open and Blancpain Endurance Series with the Kessel Racing team.

Mid-season changes

- Richie Stanaway injured his back in an accident during the third round at Spa-Francorchamps, and was forced to miss the remainder of the season. He was replaced by César Ramos, who drove for Fortec during the 2011 season. Ramos was replaced by GP2 Series driver Nigel Melker after Moscow.
- Giovanni Venturini left BVM Target due to a lack of funding. He was replaced by Auto GP World Series and Italian Formula Three driver Sergey Sirotkin for his home round in Moscow. Due to Sirotkin's contract commitments to Euronova Racing, Daniel Zampieri made a comeback to the championship at Silverstone.
- Lewis Williamson lost his drive with Arden Caterham, after he was dropped from the Red Bull Junior Team. He was replaced by GP3 Series driver António Félix da Costa.

== Race calendar and results ==
In August 2011, series organisers had announced that the championship was due to visit Russia and Brazil during the 2012 season. The 2012 calendar was announced on 10 October 2011, the day after the end of the 2011 season. Russia was included, but Brazil omitted. Seven of the nine rounds will form meetings of the 2012 World Series by Renault season, with additional rounds in support of the Monaco Grand Prix and the 6 Hours of Silverstone.

Round		Circuit	Date	Pole position	Fastest lap	Winning driver	Winning team	Rookie Winner
1	R1	(Spain) Ciudad del Motor de Aragón, Alcañiz	5 May	(France) Arthur Pic	(Netherlands) Robin Frijns	(United Kingdom) Nick Yelloly	(United Kingdom) Comtec Racing	(Denmark) Kevin Magnussen
1	R2	(Spain) Ciudad del Motor de Aragón, Alcañiz	6 May	(France) Arthur Pic	(France) Arthur Pic	(Netherlands) Robin Frijns	(United Kingdom) Fortec Motorsports	(Netherlands) Robin Frijns
2		Circuit de Monaco, Monte Carlo	27 May	(United Kingdom) Sam Bird	(France) Jules Bianchi	(United Kingdom) Sam Bird	(Czech Republic) ISR	(Switzerland) Nico Müller
3	R1	(Belgium) Circuit de Spa-Francorchamps	2 June	(Denmark) Kevin Magnussen	(France) Jules Bianchi	(Denmark) Marco Sørensen	(Czech Republic) Lotus	(Denmark) Marco Sørensen
3	R2	(Belgium) Circuit de Spa-Francorchamps	3 June	(Denmark) Kevin Magnussen	(France) Jules Bianchi	(Denmark) Kevin Magnussen	(United Kingdom) Carlin	(Denmark) Kevin Magnussen
4	R1	(Germany) Nürburgring	30 June	(France) Jules Bianchi	(France) Jules Bianchi	(France) Jules Bianchi	(France) Tech 1 Racing	(Switzerland) Nico Müller
4	R2	(Germany) Nürburgring	1 July	(Netherlands) Robin Frijns	(Russia) Mikhail Aleshin	(United Kingdom) Nick Yelloly	(United Kingdom) Comtec Racing	(Denmark) Marco Sørensen
5	R1	(Russia) Moscow Raceway	14 July	(Netherlands) Robin Frijns	(France) Jules Bianchi	(Netherlands) Robin Frijns	(United Kingdom) Fortec Motorsports	(Netherlands) Robin Frijns
5	R2	(Russia) Moscow Raceway	15 July	(France) Jules Bianchi	(France) Arthur Pic	(France) Arthur Pic	(France) DAMS	(Colombia) Carlos Huertas
6	R1	(United Kingdom) Silverstone Circuit	25 August	(Denmark) Kevin Magnussen	(Portugal) António Félix da Costa	(France) Jules Bianchi	(France) Tech 1 Racing	(Netherlands) Robin Frijns
6	R2	(United Kingdom) Silverstone Circuit	26 August	(France) Jules Bianchi	(France) Jules Bianchi	(United Kingdom) Sam Bird	(Czech Republic) ISR	(Portugal) António Félix da Costa
7	R1	(Hungary) Hungaroring, Mogyoród	15 September	(Netherlands) Robin Frijns	(France) Jules Bianchi	(Netherlands) Robin Frijns	(United Kingdom) Fortec Motorsports	(Netherlands) Robin Frijns
7	R2	(Hungary) Hungaroring, Mogyoród	16 September	(Netherlands) Robin Frijns	(United States) Alexander Rossi	(Portugal) António Félix da Costa	(United Kingdom) Arden Caterham	(Portugal) António Félix da Costa
8	R1	(France) Circuit Paul Ricard, Le Castellet	29 September	(United Kingdom) Nick Yelloly	(United States) Alexander Rossi	(Portugal) António Félix da Costa	(United Kingdom) Arden Caterham	(Portugal) António Félix da Costa
8	R2	(France) Circuit Paul Ricard, Le Castellet	30 September	(France) Jules Bianchi	(Portugal) António Félix da Costa	(France) Jules Bianchi	(France) Tech 1 Racing	(Portugal) António Félix da Costa
9	R1	(Spain) Circuit de Catalunya, Montmeló	20 October	(France) Jules Bianchi	(United States) Alexander Rossi	(Portugal) António Félix da Costa	(United Kingdom) Arden Caterham	(Portugal) António Félix da Costa
9	R2	(Spain) Circuit de Catalunya, Montmeló	21 October	(Russia) Mikhail Aleshin	(United States) Alexander Rossi	(Portugal) António Félix da Costa	(United Kingdom) Arden Caterham	(Portugal) António Félix da Costa

== Championship standings ==
Points system

Points are awarded to the top 10 classified finishers.

Position	**1st**	**2nd**	**3rd**	**4th**	**5th**	**6th**	**7th**	**8th**	**9th**	**10th**
Points	25	18	15	12	10	8	6	4	2	1

=== Drivers' Championship ===
Pos	Driver	ARA (Spain)		MON (Monaco)	SPA (Belgium)		NÜR (Germany)		MSC (Russia)		SIL (United Kingdom)		HUN (Hungary)		LEC (France)		CAT (Spain)		Points
1	(Netherlands) Robin Frijns	3	1	Ret	7	3	3	**5**	**1**	17	2	9	**1**	**5**	7	9	3	14	189
2	(France) Jules Bianchi	DSQ	13	2	2	17	**1**	12	2	**7**	1	**3**	3	9	4	**1**	**7**	Ret	185
3	(United Kingdom) Sam Bird	9	2	**1**	3	5	8	4	3	Ret	Ret	1	10	4	10	3	2	7	179
4	(Portugal) António Félix da Costa						9	11	7	15	5	2	4	1	1	2	1	1	166
5	(United Kingdom) Nick Yelloly	1	18	7	9	2	Ret	1	12	16	4	8	14	20	**2**	4	15	13	122
6	(Denmark) Marco Sørensen	7	Ret	6	1	7	6	2	6	Ret	Ret	19†	8	2	5	5	10	Ret	122
7	(Denmark) Kevin Magnussen	2	Ret	Ret	**21**	**1**	5	8	16†	10	**Ret**	Ret	2	23†	6	24†	5	4	106
8	(France) Arthur Pic	**Ret**	**3**	11	15	Ret	4	Ret	4	1	Ret	4	5	6	Ret	14	11	6	102
9	(Switzerland) Nico Müller	Ret	Ret	5	5	4	2	Ret	8	Ret	Ret	7	6	Ret	8	7	12	15	78
10	(Estonia) Kevin Korjus	Ret	4	4	DNS	13	14	Ret	5	3	Ret	15	12	7	9	8	6	17	69
11	(United States) Alexander Rossi	Ret	5	3	11	Ret	18	9	17†	5	Ret	5	9	8	22	16	19	5	63
12	(United Kingdom) Will Stevens	6	8	12	13	8	10	13	10	8	Ret	6	23	3	11	11	4	9	59
13	(Russia) Mikhail Aleshin	Ret	11	8	4	Ret	13	6	14	9	11†	17†	Ret	19	12	17	9	**2**	46
14	(Austria) Walter Grubmüller	16	Ret	9	8	6	7	15	Ret	2	9	Ret	20	10	13	12	13	10	42
15	(Brazil) André Negrão	8	10	Ret	12	12	19	3	13	4	Ret	16	15	Ret	Ret	22	14	8	36
16	(Colombia) Carlos Huertas	4	12	10	Ret	Ret	23†	Ret	Ret	6	6	11	7	12	15	15	18	18	35
17	(Russia) Daniil Move	17	7	15	14	14	15	7	9	11	Ret	14	17	15	3	25†	21	16	29
18	(Finland) Aaro Vainio												Ret	18	16	6	8	3	27
19	(Netherlands) Nigel Melker										3	Ret							15
20	(Russia) Nikolay Martsenko	5	15	18	10	9	21	Ret	Ret	18	Ret	12	Ret	14	23	21	25	20	13
21	(United States) Jake Rosenzweig	Ret	Ret	Ret	6	18	11	17†	Ret	12	Ret	13	16	22	20	20	17	11	8
22	(New Zealand) Richie Stanaway	Ret	6	Ret	NC	Ret													8
23	(Brazil) Lucas Foresti	11	Ret	17	Ret	Ret	Ret	10	18†	14	7	18	11	13	14	10	Ret	Ret	8
24	(Italy) Vittorio Ghirelli	12	17	16	20	Ret	Ret	Ret	11	Ret	8	10	21	17	17	23	20	19	5
25	(Italy) Giovanni Venturini	Ret	9	Ret	16	10	22	14											3
26	(Switzerland) Zoël Amberg	10	16	14	18	Ret	16	18	15	13	Ret	Ret	13	16	18	Ret	24	22	1
27	(Italy) Daniel Zampieri										10	Ret							1
28	(Hungary) Tamás Pál Kiss												19	11			22	12	0
29	(Brazil) Yann Cunha	15	Ret	Ret	17	11	17	Ret	19	Ret	Ret	Ret	22	21	21	19	23	21	0
30	(Brazil) César Ramos						12	Ret	Ret	Ret									0
31	(Russia) Anton Nebylitskiy	13	14	Ret	DNS	15	20	16	Ret	Ret	Ret	DNS							0
32	(United Kingdom) Lewis Williamson	14	Ret	13	19	16													0
33	(Italy) Davide Rigon														19	13			0
34	(Germany) Daniel Abt												18	24	Ret	18	16	Ret	0
35	(Russia) Sergey Sirotkin								20	Ret									0
Pos	Driver	ARA (Spain)		MON (Monaco)	SPA (Belgium)		NÜR (Germany)		MSC (Russia)		SIL (United Kingdom)		HUN (Hungary)		LEC (France)		CAT (Spain)		Points

Colour	Result
Gold	Winner
Silver	Second place
Bronze	Third place
Green	Points classification
Blue	Non-points classification
Blue	Non-classified finish (NC)
Purple	Retired, not classified (Ret)
Red	Did not qualify (DNQ)
Red	Did not pre-qualify (DNPQ)
Black	Disqualified (DSQ)
White	Did not start (DNS)
White	Withdrew (WD)
White	Race cancelled (C)
Blank	Did not practice (DNP)
Blank	Did not arrive (DNA)
Blank	Excluded (EX)

**Bold** – Pole
Italics – Fastest Lap
† – Retired, but classified

=== Teams' Championship ===
Pos	Team	Car No.	ARA (Spain)		MON (Monaco)	SPA (Belgium)		NÜR (Germany)		MSC (Russia)		SIL (United Kingdom)		HUN (Hungary)		LEC (France)		CAT (Spain)		Points
1	(France) Tech 1 Racing	7	Ret	4	4	DNS	13	14	Ret	5	3	Ret	15	18	24	Ret	18	16	Ret	234
1	(France) Tech 1 Racing	8	DSQ	13	2	2	17	**1**	12	2	**7**	1	**3**	3	9	4	**1**	**7**	Ret	234
2	(United Kingdom) Arden Caterham	25	Ret	5	3	11	Ret	18	9	17	5	Ret	5	9	8	22	16	19	5	229
2	(United Kingdom) Arden Caterham	26	14	Ret	13	19	16	9	11	7	15	5	2	4	1	1	2	1	1	229
3	(United Kingdom) Fortec Motorsports	3	4	12	10	Ret	Ret	23†	Ret	Ret	6	6	11	7	12	15	15	18	18	224
3	(United Kingdom) Fortec Motorsports	4	3	1	Ret	7	3	3	**5**	**1**	17	2	9	**1**	**5**	7	9	3	14	224
4	(Czech Republic) ISR	5	9	2	**1**	3	5	8	4	3	Ret	Ret	1	10	4	10	3	2	7	187
4	(Czech Republic) ISR	6	Ret	Ret	Ret	6	18	11	17†	Ret	12	Ret	13	16	22	20	20	17	11	187
5	(United Kingdom) Carlin	1	2	Ret	Ret	**21**	**1**	5	8	16†	10	**Ret**	Ret	2	23†	6	24†	5	4	165
5	(United Kingdom) Carlin	2	6	8	12	13	8	10	13	10	8	Ret	6	23	3	11	11	4	9	165
6	(Czech Republic) Lotus	11	Ret	6	Ret	NC	Ret	12	Ret	Ret	Ret	3	Ret	12	7	9	8	6	17	165
6	(Czech Republic) Lotus	12	7	Ret	6	1	7	6	2	6	Ret	Ret	19†	8	2	5	5	10	Ret	165
7	(United Kingdom) Comtec Racing	23	12	17	16	20	Ret	Ret	Ret	11	Ret	8	10	21	17	17	23	20	19	127
7	(United Kingdom) Comtec Racing	24	1	18	7	9	2	Ret	1	12	16	4	8	14	20	**2**	4	15	13	127
8	(Italy) International Draco Racing	21	Ret	Ret	5	5	4	2	Ret	8	Ret	Ret	7	6	Ret	8	7	12	15	114
8	(Italy) International Draco Racing	22	8	10	Ret	12	12	19	3	13	4	Ret	16	15	Ret	Ret	22	14	8	114
9	(France) DAMS	27	11	Ret	17	Ret	Ret	Ret	10	18†	14	7	18	11	13	14	10	Ret	Ret	110
9	(France) DAMS	28	**Ret**	**3**	11	15	Ret	4	Ret	4	1	Ret	4	5	6	Ret	14	11	5	110
10	(Russia) Team RFR	17	Ret	11	8	4	Ret	13	6	14	9	11†	17†	Ret	19	12	17	9	**2**	73
10	(Russia) Team RFR	18	13	14	Ret	DNS	15	20	16	Ret	Ret	Ret	DNS	Ret	18	16	6	8	3	73
11	(Netherlands) P1 Motorsport	9	16	Ret	9	8	6	7	15	Ret	2	9	Ret	20	10	13	12	13	10	71
11	(Netherlands) P1 Motorsport	10	17	7	15	14	14	15	7	9	11	Ret	14	17	15	3	25†	21	16	71
12	(Italy) BVM Target	15	Ret	9	Ret	16	10	22	14	20	Ret	10	Ret	19	11	19	13	22	12	17
12	(Italy) BVM Target	16	5	15	18	10	9	21	Ret	Ret	18	Ret	12	Ret	14	23	21	25	20	17
13	(Spain) Pons Racing	19	15	Ret	Ret	17	11	16	Ret	19	Ret	Ret	Ret	22	21	21	19	23	21	1
13	(Spain) Pons Racing	20	10	16	14	18	Ret	17	18	15	13	Ret	Ret	13	16	18	Ret	24	22	1
Pos	Team	Car No.	ARA (Spain)		MON (Monaco)	SPA (Belgium)		NÜR (Germany)		MSC (Russia)		SIL (United Kingdom)		HUN (Hungary)		LEC (France)		CAT (Spain)		Points

Colour	Result
Gold	Winner
Silver	Second place
Bronze	Third place
Green	Points classification
Blue	Non-points classification
Blue	Non-classified finish (NC)
Purple	Retired, not classified (Ret)
Red	Did not qualify (DNQ)
Red	Did not pre-qualify (DNPQ)
Black	Disqualified (DSQ)
White	Did not start (DNS)
White	Withdrew (WD)
White	Race cancelled (C)
Blank	Did not practice (DNP)
Blank	Did not arrive (DNA)
Blank	Excluded (EX)

**Bold** – Pole
Italics – Fastest Lap
† – Retired, but classified
