= Nikolay Martsenko =

Russian racing driver (born 1993)

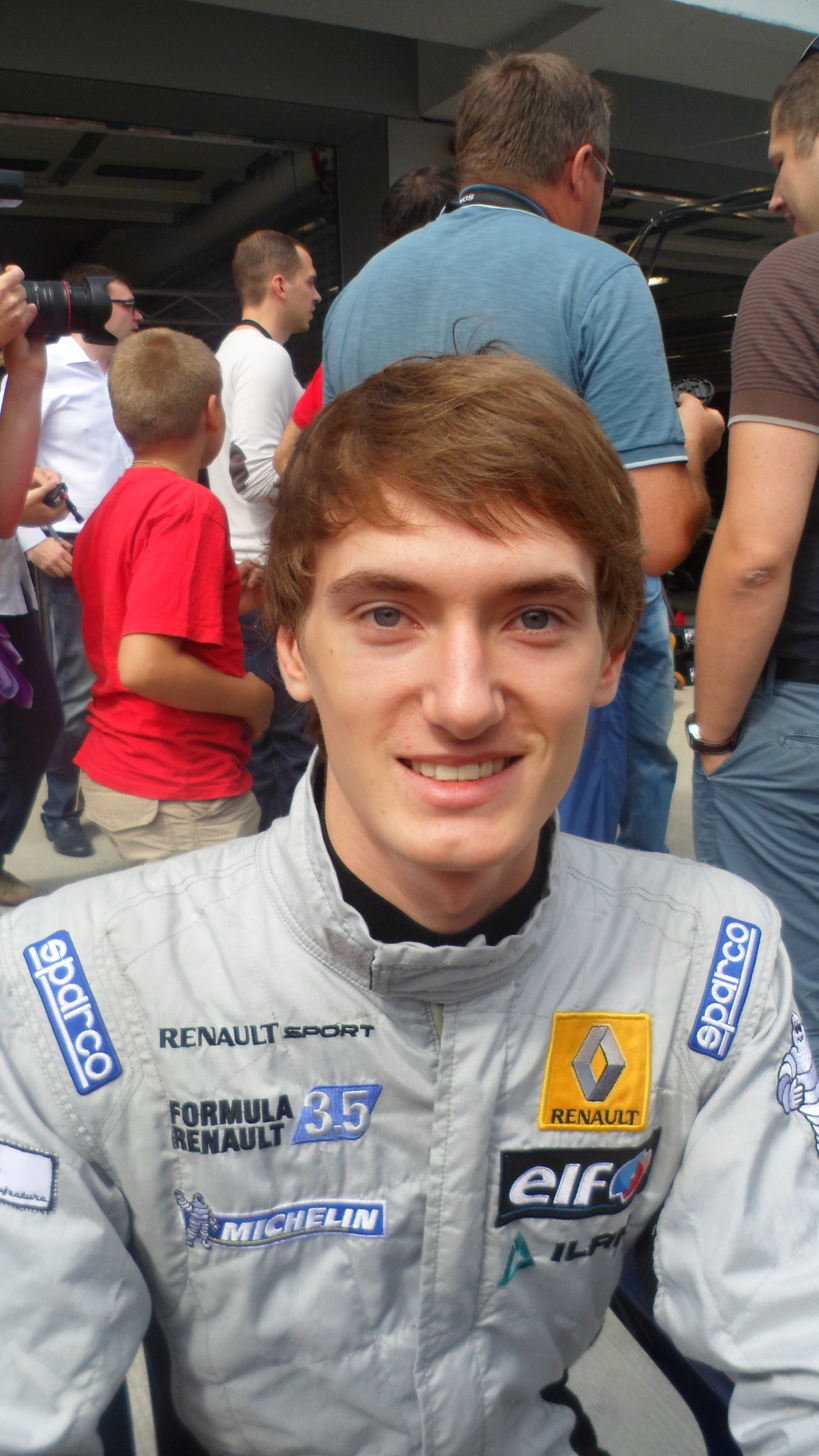
- Martsenko in 2012.
- Nationality: (Russia) Russian
- Born: Nikolay Yuryevich Martsenko; 25 May 1993 (age 33) Krasnoyarsk (Russia)

Formula Renault 3.5 Series career
- Debut season: 2012
- Current team: Comtec Racing
- Car number: 26
- Former teams: Pons Racing; BVM Target
- Starts: 34
- Wins: 0
- Poles: 0
- Fastest laps: 0
- Best finish: 14th in 2014

Previous series
- 2014 2009-11 2009 2009: GP3 Series; German Formula Three; Finnish Formula Three; Formula Three NEZ

Nikolay Yuryevich Martsenko (Russian: Никола́й Ю́рьевич Ма́рценко, [nʲɪkɐˈlaj ˈurʲɪvʲɪtɕ ˈmartsɛnkə], born 25 May 1993) is a Russian racing driver.

== Career ==
=== Early career ===
Born in Krasnoyarsk, Martsenko started his racing career at the age of eleven in amateur Russian touring car championships. Since sixteen, he participated in various Formula Three championships including German Formula Three Championship, Finnish Formula Three Championship and North European Zone Formula 3 Cup.

=== Formula Three ===
Martsenko's German Formula Three campaign started in 2009 with four races in Trophy Classes at Oschersleben for Jenichen Motorsport. For the next season, he graduated into the Cup Class with Max Travin Racing Team, for which he raced in Finnish Formula Three Championship and North European Zone Formula 3 Cup. In 2011, he stayed in series in the same team, amassing nine points with the best result — finish on fourth place at Assen.

=== Formula Renault 3.5 Series ===
For 2012, Max Travin Racing Team planned to enter the championship with Martsenko as one of drivers. But the team was rejected from final entry list. After this, Max Travin Racing and Martsenko joined forces with BVM Target for his debut in the series.

=== GP3 Series ===
In 2014, Martsenko joined Hilmer Motorsport for two rounds of the GP3 Series. He did not score in any of the four races.

== Racing record ==
=== Career summary ===
Season	Series	Team	Races	Wins	Poles	F/Laps	Podiums	Points	Position
2008	Lada Cup Krasnoyarsk	Ilan-MotorSport	12	1	0	?	3	62	4th
2009	Formula 3 Finland	Max Travin Racing Team	10	1	0	3	6	134	4th
2009	North European Zone Formula 3 Cup	Max Travin Racing Team	4	1	0	0	2	59	5th
2009	German Formula 3 Trophy	Jenichen Motorsport	4	0	0	0	1	16	7th
2010	German Formula 3 Championship	Max Travin Racing Team	18	0	0	0	0	1	18th
2011	German Formula 3 Championship	Max Travin Racing Team	18	0	0	0	0	9	12th
2012	Formula Renault 3.5 Series	BVM Target	17	0	0	0	0	13	20th
2013	Formula Renault 3.5 Series	Pons Racing	17	0	0	0	0	20	20th
2014	Formula Renault 3.5 Series	Comtec Racing	4	0	0	0	1	36	14th
2014	GP3 Series	Hilmer Motorsport	3	0	0	0	0	0	33rd

=== Complete Formula Renault 3.5 Series results ===
(key) (Races in bold indicate pole position) (Races in italics indicate fastest lap)

Year	Team	1	2	3	4	5	6	7	8	9	10	11	12	13	14	15	16	17	Pos	Points
2012	BVM Target	ALC; 1; 5	ALC; 2; 15	MON; 1; 18	SPA; 1; 10	SPA; 2; 9	NÜR; 1; 21	NÜR; 2 Ret	MSC; 1 Ret	MSC; 2; 18	SIL; 1 Ret	SIL; 2; 12	HUN; 1 Ret	HUN; 2; 14	LEC; 1; 23	LEC; 2; 21	CAT; 1; 25	CAT; 2; 20	20th	13
2013	Pons Racing	MNZ; 1 Ret	MNZ; 2 Ret	ALC; 1; 12	ALC; 2; 21	MON; 1; 21	SPA; 1; 6	SPA; 2; 7	MSC; 1 Ret	MSC; 2; 14	RBR; 1 Ret	RBR; 2 Ret	HUN; 1; 11	HUN; 2 Ret	LEC; 1; 7	LEC; 2; 12	CAT; 1; 13†	CAT; 2; 17	20th	20
2014	Comtec Racing	MNZ; 1; 5	MNZ; 2; 6	ALC; 1; 2	ALC; 2 Ret	MON; 1	SPA; 1	SPA; 2	MSC; 1	MSC; 2	NÜR; 1	NÜR; 2	HUN; 1	HUN; 2	LEC; 1	LEC; 2	JER; 1	JER; 2	14th	36

=== Complete GP3 Series results ===
(key) (Races in bold indicate pole position) (Races in italics indicate fastest lap)

Year	Entrant	1	2	3	4	5	6	7	8	9	10	11	12	13	14	15	16	17	18	Pos	Points
2014	Hilmer Motorsport	CAT; FEA	CAT; SPR	RBR; FEA; 19	RBR; SPR; DNS	SIL; FEA	SIL; SPR	HOC; FEA	HOC; SPR	HUN; FEA	HUN; SPR	SPA; FEA	SPA; SPR	MNZ; FEA	MNZ; SPR	SOC; FEA; 19	SOC; SPR; Ret	YMC; FEA	YMC; SPR	33rd	0
