= 2011 Formula Renault 3.5 Series =

Sports season

Seasons
- ← 2010 2012 →

The 2011 Formula Renault 3.5 Series was the seventh season of the Renault–supported single–seater category. It was the final season for the current Dallara chassis with Renault Sport Technologies having confirmed a new car for the 2012 season.

After featuring 12 teams during the 2010 season, following the late withdrawal of SG Formula, the grid expanded to 13 teams in 2011 with the addition of leading Formula Abarth and Italian Formula Three outfit BVM–Target.

== Regulation changes ==
=== Sporting ===
- The points system for the 2011 season changed to reflect the system used by the FIA for World championships. The top ten drivers in each race received points as follows: 25, 18, 15, 12, 10, 8, 6, 4, 2, and 1.

== Teams and drivers ==
R = Series rookie for 2011

Team	No.	Driver name	Status	Rounds
(France) Tech 1 Racing	1	(Estonia) Kevin Korjus	R	All
(France) Tech 1 Racing	2	(France) Arthur Pic	R	All
(Czech Republic) ISR	3	(United Kingdom) Lewis Williamson	R	1, 9
(Czech Republic) ISR	3	(Australia) Daniel Ricciardo		2–8
(Czech Republic) ISR	4	(France) Nathanaël Berthon		All
(United Kingdom) Carlin	5	(France) Jean-Éric Vergne		All
(United Kingdom) Carlin	6	(Canada) Robert Wickens		All
(United Kingdom) Fortec Motorsports	7	(United States) Alexander Rossi	R	All
(United Kingdom) Fortec Motorsports	8	(Brazil) César Ramos	R	All
(United Kingdom) Comtec Racing	9	(United Kingdom) Daniel McKenzie	R	All
(United Kingdom) Comtec Racing	10	(Netherlands) Daniël de Jong	R	All
(Spain) EPIC Racing	11	(Estonia) Sten Pentus		All
(Spain) EPIC Racing	12	(Spain) Albert Costa		All
(Italy) International DracoRacing	15	(Monaco) Stéphane Richelmi	R	All
(Italy) International DracoRacing	16	(Brazil) André Negrão	R	1–8
(Italy) International DracoRacing	16	(France) Adrien Tambay	R	9
(Spain) Pons Racing	17	(United Kingdom) Oliver Webb	R	All
(Spain) Pons Racing	18	(New Zealand) Dominic Storey	R	1
(Spain) Pons Racing	18	(France) Jean-Karl Vernay	R	2
(Spain) Pons Racing	18	(Czech Republic) Filip Salaquarda		3
(Spain) Pons Racing	18	(France) Adrien Tambay	R	4
(Spain) Pons Racing	18	(Romania) Michael Herck		5
(Spain) Pons Racing	18	(Spain) Marcos Martínez		6
(Spain) Pons Racing	18	(United Kingdom) Nick Yelloly	R	7–9
(Malaysia) Mofaz Racing	19	(New Zealand) Chris van der Drift		1–4
(Malaysia) Mofaz Racing	19	(Malaysia) Fairuz Fauzy		5–9
(Malaysia) Mofaz Racing	20	(United States) Jake Rosenzweig		All
(Russia) KMP Racing	21	(Russia) Anton Nebylitskiy		1–5, 7–9
(Russia) KMP Racing	21	(Russia) Mikhail Aleshin		6
(Russia) KMP Racing	22	(France) Nelson Panciatici		All
(Netherlands) P1 Motorsport	23	(Austria) Walter Grubmüller		1–5, 7–9
(Netherlands) P1 Motorsport	23	(United Kingdom) Adam Carroll	R	6
(Netherlands) P1 Motorsport	24	(Russia) Daniil Move		All
(Italy) BVM–Target	25	(Italy) Daniel Zampieri		All
(Italy) BVM–Target	26	(Spain) Sergio Canamasas		All
(Czech Republic) Gravity–Charouz Racing	27	(Czech Republic) Jan Charouz		All
(Czech Republic) Gravity–Charouz Racing	28	(New Zealand) Brendon Hartley		All

=== Driver changes ===
Changed teams

- International DracoRacing driver Nathanaël Berthon moved to ISR.
- Daniil Move returned to P1 Motorsport after a season with Junior Lotus Racing.
- After finishing as runner–up in the 2010 season, Daniel Ricciardo joined Czech team ISR Racing. Ricciardo began his season at Spa, as he missed the Aragón round due to reserve driver duties at the Chinese Grand Prix.
- Having contested the last six races of the 2010 season with Tech 1 Racing, Jean-Éric Vergne moved to Carlin, having won the British F3 title with the team.
- For his second season in the series, Nelson Panciatici moved to KMP Racing from Junior Lotus Racing.
- After driving for P1 Motorsport in 2010, Jan Charouz joined the newly formed Gravity–Charouz Racing team. He was joined by Brendon Hartley, who raced for Tech 1 Racing and P1 Motorsport the previous season.
- Jake Rosenzweig moved from the Carlin team to Mofaz Racing for his second season in the series.
- BVM–Target signed Pons Racing driver Daniel Zampieri and FHV Interwetten.com driver Sergio Canamasas to drive in their début season in the series.
- Sten Pentus switched from Fortec Motorsport to EPIC Racing.

Entering/Re–Entering FR3.5

- FIA Formula Two champion Dean Stoneman, who contested the final round of the 2010 season with Junior Lotus Racing, was set to compete with ISR Racing, but withdrew after being diagnosed with testicular cancer.
- Eurocup Formula Renault 2.0 champion Kevin Korjus and his Eurocup rival Arthur Pic moved into the series, competing for Tech 1 Racing.
- Italian Formula Three runner–up Stéphane Richelmi and 13th–placed Eurocup driver André Negrão joined International Draco Racing
- Alexander Rossi joined Fortec Motorsports, having competed in GP3 for ART Grand Prix as well as the Monaco Grand Prix–supporting round with ISR Racing in 2010. His teammate was Italian Formula Three champion César Ramos.
- Daniel McKenzie and Oliver Webb moved up to the series from British F3, and drove for Comtec Racing and Pons Racing respectively.
- After finishing ninth in Eurocup Formula Renault 2.0, Daniël de Jong graduated to the series with Comtec Racing.
- Robert Wickens returned to Carlin, after runner-up placings in Formula Two in 2009 and GP3 in 2010. Wickens finished 12th with Carlin in the 2008 season.
- Formula Renault UK runner–up Lewis Williamson contested the first round of the championship in Aragón for ISR, replacing Daniel Ricciardo due to his Formula One reserve driver duties in China.
- Chris van der Drift returned to Formula Renault 3.5 from Superleague Formula, and drove the first four meetings for Mofaz Racing. His budget ran out after Monaco and was replaced by Fairuz Fauzy.
- After missing the 2010 racing season, Dominic Storey drove for Pons Racing in Aragón. For the second round at Spa-Francorchamps, he was replaced by Indy Lights champion Jean-Karl Vernay. After Filip Salaquarda took the seat for the third round, Adrien Tambay drove in Monaco and GP2 racer Michael Herck drove for the team at the Nürburgring. Marcos Martínez, who won four races for the team in 2009 will compete at the Hungaroring.
- Former GP2 and A1 Grand Prix driver Adam Carroll replaced the injured Walter Grubmüller at the Hungaroring.

Leaving FR3.5

- Reigning champion Mikhail Aleshin was due to graduate to the GP2 Series with the Carlin team, but had to withdraw from the series due to budgetary issues. He will instead compete in the German Formula Three Championship with STROMOS Artline.
- Stefano Coletti and Julián Leal also graduated to GP2, racing for Trident Racing and Rapax respectively.
- Filip Salaquarda, who drove for ISR Racing in 2010, moved to the Superleague Formula series. Prior to doing so, he contested the third event of Formula Renault 3.5 at Monza.
- After competing for KMP Racing in 2010, Víctor García switched to Indy Lights in the United States, driving for Team Moore Racing. Also moving to Indy Lights is Esteban Guerrieri, who competed for Sam Schmidt Motorsports having finished third for ISR Racing in 2010.
- Bruno Méndez returned to Formula Three in 2011, racing in the British championship for Hitech Racing.
- Greg Mansell moved into sportscar racing for 2011, joining the Lotus Italia Scuderia Giudici team in the inaugural Blancpain Endurance Series.
- After two seasons with Pons Racing, Federico Leo moved to the FIA GT3 Championship with AF Corse, sharing a Ferrari 458 with Francesco Castellacci.
- Jon Lancaster, who drove for Fortec Motorsport in 2010, joined the FIA Formula Two Championship.

=== Team changes ===
- Italian team BVM–Target joined the grid as the 13th team, taking the slot vacated by SG Formula before the start of the 2010 season.
- Gravity–Charouz Racing, with technical support from DAMS, took over the FHV Interwetten.com team's entry.
- After undergoing a restructuring process during the off–season, Epsilon Euskadi became known as EPIC Racing.

== Race calendar and results ==
The calendar for the 2011 season was announced on 11 October 2010, the day after the end of the 2010 season. Seven of the nine rounds formed meetings of the 2011 World Series by Renault season, with additional rounds in support of the FIA WTCC Race of Italy and the Monaco Grand Prix.

Round		Circuit	Date	Pole position	Fastest lap	Winning driver	Winning team	Rookie Winner
1	R1	(Spain) Ciudad del Motor de Aragón, Alcañiz	16 April	(Canada) Robert Wickens	(United States) Alexander Rossi	(United States) Alexander Rossi	(United Kingdom) Fortec Motorsports	(United States) Alexander Rossi
1	R2	(Spain) Ciudad del Motor de Aragón, Alcañiz	17 April	(Brazil) César Ramos	(Estonia) Kevin Korjus	(Estonia) Kevin Korjus	(France) Tech 1 Racing	(Estonia) Kevin Korjus
2	R1	(Belgium) Circuit de Spa-Francorchamps	30 April	(Canada) Robert Wickens	(Canada) Robert Wickens	(Canada) Robert Wickens	(United Kingdom) Carlin	(United States) Alexander Rossi
2	R2	(Belgium) Circuit de Spa-Francorchamps	1 May	(France) Jean-Éric Vergne	(Canada) Robert Wickens	(France) Jean-Éric Vergne	(United Kingdom) Carlin	(United States) Alexander Rossi
3	R1	(Italy) Autodromo Nazionale Monza	14 May	(Brazil) César Ramos	(Canada) Robert Wickens	(Estonia) Kevin Korjus	(France) Tech 1 Racing	(Estonia) Kevin Korjus
3	R2	(Italy) Autodromo Nazionale Monza	15 May	(Australia) Daniel Ricciardo	(Australia) Daniel Ricciardo	(France) Jean-Éric Vergne	(United Kingdom) Carlin	(United States) Alexander Rossi
4		Circuit de Monaco, Monte Carlo	29 May	(Australia) Daniel Ricciardo	(Australia) Daniel Ricciardo	(Australia) Daniel Ricciardo	(Czech Republic) ISR	(Estonia) Kevin Korjus
5	R1	(Germany) Nürburgring	18 June	(Canada) Robert Wickens	(New Zealand) Brendon Hartley	(Canada) Robert Wickens	(United Kingdom) Carlin	(Estonia) Kevin Korjus
5	R2	(Germany) Nürburgring	19 June	(Canada) Robert Wickens	(Spain) Sergio Canamasas	(Estonia) Kevin Korjus	(France) Tech 1 Racing	(Estonia) Kevin Korjus
6	R1	(Hungary) Hungaroring, Mogyoród	2 July	(France) Jean-Éric Vergne	(United States) Jake Rosenzweig	(France) Jean-Éric Vergne	(United Kingdom) Carlin	(United States) Alexander Rossi
6	R2	(Hungary) Hungaroring, Mogyoród	3 July	(Spain) Sergio Canamasas	(Spain) Sergio Canamasas	(France) Jean-Éric Vergne	(United Kingdom) Carlin	(United Kingdom) Adam Carroll
7	R1	(United Kingdom) Silverstone Circuit	20 August	(Canada) Robert Wickens	(Australia) Daniel Ricciardo	(Canada) Robert Wickens	(United Kingdom) Carlin	(United States) Alexander Rossi
7	R2	(United Kingdom) Silverstone Circuit	21 August	(Canada) Robert Wickens	(Czech Republic) Jan Charouz	(Canada) Robert Wickens	(United Kingdom) Carlin	(Estonia) Kevin Korjus
8	R1	(France) Circuit Paul Ricard, Le Castellet	17 September	(France) Jean-Éric Vergne	(New Zealand) Brendon Hartley	(France) Jean-Éric Vergne	(United Kingdom) Carlin	(Brazil) César Ramos
8	R2	(France) Circuit Paul Ricard, Le Castellet	18 September	(France) Jean-Éric Vergne	(Canada) Robert Wickens	(United States) Alexander Rossi	(United Kingdom) Fortec Motorsports	(United States) Alexander Rossi
9	R1	(Spain) Circuit de Catalunya, Montmeló	8 October	(Canada) Robert Wickens	(France) Jean-Éric Vergne	(Canada) Robert Wickens	(United Kingdom) Carlin	(United States) Alexander Rossi
9	R2	(Spain) Circuit de Catalunya, Montmeló	9 October	(Spain) Albert Costa	(Spain) Albert Costa	(Spain) Albert Costa	(Spain) EPIC Racing	(United Kingdom) Nick Yelloly

== Season results ==
- Points for both championships were awarded as follows:

1st	2nd	3rd	4th	5th	6th	7th	8th	9th	10th
25	18	15	12	10	8	6	4	2	1

=== Drivers' Championship ===
Pos	Driver	ARA (Spain)		SPA (Belgium)		MNZ (Italy)		MON (Monaco)	NÜR (Germany)		HUN (Hungary)		SIL (United Kingdom)		LEC (France)		CAT (Spain)		Points
1	(Canada) Robert Wickens	**2**	5	**1**	2	Ret	Ret	2	**1**	**2**	5	7	**1**	**1**	2	19	**1**	Ret	241
2	(France) Jean-Éric Vergne	6	7	2	**1**	2	1	12	Ret	4	**1**	1	12	4	**1**	**3**	2	Ret	232
3	(United States) Alexander Rossi	1	2	7	7	17	3	Ret	Ret	Ret	2	5	3	DSQ	16	1	4	7	156
4	(Spain) Albert Costa	4	3	3	5	18	5	9	5	6	Ret	2	5	5	DSQ	7	Ret	**1**	151
5	(Australia) Daniel Ricciardo			10	9	6	**2**	**1**	2	5	DNS	12	2	2	6	2			144
6	(Estonia) Kevin Korjus	Ret	1	Ret	Ret	1	Ret	4	3	1	6	23	8	8	9	18	11	Ret	120
7	(New Zealand) Brendon Hartley	21	Ret	4	8	5	Ret	3	14	7	8	6	21	7	3	20	DNS	3	95
8	(Spain) Sergio Canamasas	22	10	9	Ret	Ret	8	21†	9	11	3	**4**	10	19	5	17	5	4	69
9	(France) Nelson Panciatici	3	Ret	5	10	DNS	7	5	18	15	7	17	20†	17	10	11	7	Ret	55
10	(Russia) Daniil Move	5	18	6	13	3	Ret	17	17	18	Ret	14	13	NC	7	Ret	3	14	54
11	(Brazil) César Ramos	23	**4**	13	Ret	**Ret**	4	20†	4	8	10	24†	Ret	DSQ	8	9	Ret	Ret	47
12	(New Zealand) Chris van der Drift	8	13	11	3	4	6	8											43
13	(France) Nathanaël Berthon	12	8	14	16	Ret	Ret	10	Ret	Ret	9	10	4	3	14	14	9	Ret	37
14	(United Kingdom) Nick Yelloly												DSQ	14	Ret	5	6	2	36
15	(United States) Jake Rosenzweig	13	12	20	Ret	11	16	18	10	Ret	Ret	15	11	6	4	4	19	Ret	33
16	(Italy) Daniel Zampieri	9	21	18	4	Ret	17	14	7	9	12	9	Ret	13	13	8	12	Ret	28
17	(United Kingdom) Adam Carroll										4	3							27
18	(Austria) Walter Grubmüller	7	16	12	6	8	13	13	12	DNS			9	11	12	Ret	13	8	24
19	(Russia) Anton Nebylitskiy	Ret	6	DNS	19	19	19	Ret	8	Ret			15	15	Ret	16	Ret	5	22
20	(Brazil) André Negrão	14	9	DNS	11	10	10	Ret	6	12	20	Ret	Ret	16	15	6			20
21	(United Kingdom) Oliver Webb	11	17	Ret	18	9	11	Ret	Ret	16	17	19	7	12	11	10	Ret	6	17
22	(Malaysia) Fairuz Fauzy								11	3	13	16	Ret	18	21	15	15	11	15
23	(France) Arthur Pic	Ret	14	16	12	Ret	9	6	20	14	19	11	16	21	19	Ret	10	10	12
24	(Estonia) Sten Pentus	10	11	Ret	14	16	Ret	11	19	10	14	Ret	6	10	22	Ret	14	13	11
25	(Czech Republic) Jan Charouz	17	22	8	20	12	12	Ret	21	17	Ret	21	14	9	Ret	Ret	8	Ret	10
26	(Monaco) Stéphane Richelmi	16	Ret	17	Ret	7	15	16	13	13	15	20	19	20	17	13	Ret	Ret	6
27	(France) Adrien Tambay							7									DNS	Ret	6
28	(Russia) Mikhail Aleshin										11	8							4
29	(Netherlands) Daniël de Jong	19	15	Ret	Ret	14	14	19	16	19	16	18	18	Ret	20	12	16	9	2
30	(United Kingdom) Daniel McKenzie	18	23	19	17	13	Ret	15	15	20	18	22	17	Ret	18	Ret	17	12	0
31	(Spain) Marcos Martínez										Ret	13							0
32	(France) Jean-Karl Vernay			15	15														0
33	(United Kingdom) Lewis Williamson	15	20														18	Ret	0
34	(Czech Republic) Filip Salaquarda					15	18												0
35	(New Zealand) Dominic Storey	20	19																0
36	(Romania) Michael Herck								Ret	21									0
Pos	Driver	ARA (Spain)		SPA (Belgium)		MNZ (Italy)		MON (Monaco)	NÜR (Germany)		HUN (Hungary)		SIL (United Kingdom)		LEC (France)		CAT (Spain)		Points

Colour	Result
Gold	Winner
Silver	Second place
Bronze	Third place
Green	Points classification
Blue	Non-points classification
Blue	Non-classified finish (NC)
Purple	Retired, not classified (Ret)
Red	Did not qualify (DNQ)
Red	Did not pre-qualify (DNPQ)
Black	Disqualified (DSQ)
White	Did not start (DNS)
White	Withdrew (WD)
White	Race cancelled (C)
Blank	Did not practice (DNP)
Blank	Did not arrive (DNA)
Blank	Excluded (EX)

**Bold** – Pole
Italics – Fastest Lap
† – Retired, but classified

=== Teams' Championship ===
Pos	Team	Car No.	ARA (Spain)		SPA (Belgium)		MNZ (Italy)		MON (Monaco)	NÜR (Germany)		HUN (Hungary)		SIL (United Kingdom)		LEC (France)		CAT (Spain)		Points
1	(United Kingdom) Carlin	5	6	7	2	**1**	2	1	12	Ret	4	**1**	1	12	4	**1**	**3**	2	Ret	473
1	(United Kingdom) Carlin	6	**2**	5	**1**	2	Ret	Ret	2	**1**	**2**	5	7	**1**	**1**	2	19	**1**	Ret	473
2	(United Kingdom) Fortec Motorsports	7	1	2	7	7	17	3	Ret	Ret	Ret	2	5	3	DSQ	16	1	4	7	203
2	(United Kingdom) Fortec Motorsports	8	23	**4**	13	Ret	**Ret**	4	20†	4	8	10	24†	Ret	DSQ	8	9	Ret	Ret	203
3	(Czech Republic) ISR	3	15	20	10	9	6	**2**	**1**	2	5	DNS	12	2	2	6	2	18	Ret	181
3	(Czech Republic) ISR	4	12	8	14	16	Ret	Ret	10	Ret	Ret	9	10	4	3	14	14	9	Ret	181
4	(Spain) EPIC Racing	11	10	11	Ret	14	16	Ret	11	19	10	14	Ret	6	10	22	Ret	14	13	162
4	(Spain) EPIC Racing	12	4	3	3	5	18	5	9	5	6	Ret	2	5	5	DSQ	7	Ret	**1**	162
5	(France) Tech 1 Racing	1	Ret	1	Ret	Ret	1	Ret	4	3	1	6	23	8	8	9	18	11	Ret	132
5	(France) Tech 1 Racing	2	Ret	14	16	12	Ret	9	6	20	14	19	11	16	21	19	Ret	10	10	132
6	(Netherlands) P1 Motorsport	23	7	16	12	6	8	13	13	12	DNS	4	3	9	11	12	Ret	13	8	105
6	(Netherlands) P1 Motorsport	24	5	18	6	13	3	Ret	17	17	18	Ret	14	13	NC	7	Ret	3	14	105
7	(Czech Republic) Gravity–Charouz Racing	27	17	22	8	20	12	12	Ret	21	17	Ret	21	14	9	Ret	Ret	8	Ret	105
7	(Czech Republic) Gravity–Charouz Racing	28	21	Ret	4	8	5	Ret	3	14	7	8	6	21	7	3	20	DNS	3	105
8	(Italy) BVM-Target	25	9	21	18	4	Ret	17	14	7	9	12	9	Ret	13	13	8	12	Ret	97
8	(Italy) BVM-Target	26	22	10	9	Ret	Ret	8	21†	9	11	3	**4**	10	19	5	17	5	4	97
9	(Malaysia) Mofaz Racing	19	8	13	11	3	4	6	8	11	3	13	16	Ret	18	21	15	15	11	91
9	(Malaysia) Mofaz Racing	20	13	12	20	Ret	11	16	18	10	Ret	Ret	15	11	6	4	4	19	Ret	91
10	(Russia) KMP Racing	21	Ret	6	DNS	19	19	19	Ret	8	Ret	11	8	15	15	Ret	16	Ret	5	81
10	(Russia) KMP Racing	22	3	Ret	5	10	DNS	7	5	18	15	7	17	20†	17	10	11	7	Ret	81
11	(Spain) Pons Racing	17	11	17	Ret	18	9	11	Ret	Ret	16	17	19	7	12	11	10	Ret	6	59
11	(Spain) Pons Racing	18	20	19	15	15	15	18	7	Ret	21	Ret	13	DSQ	14	Ret	5	6	2	59
12	(Italy) International DracoRacing	15	16	Ret	17	Ret	7	15	16	13	13	15	20	19	20	17	13	Ret	Ret	26
12	(Italy) International DracoRacing	16	14	9	DNS	11	10	10	Ret	6	12	20	Ret	Ret	16	15	6	DNS	Ret	26
13	(United Kingdom) Comtec Racing	9	18	23	19	17	13	Ret	15	15	20	18	22	17	Ret	18	Ret	17	12	2
13	(United Kingdom) Comtec Racing	10	19	15	Ret	Ret	14	14	19	16	19	16	18	18	Ret	20	12	16	9	2
Pos	Team	Car No.	ARA (Spain)		SPA (Belgium)		MNZ (Italy)		MON (Monaco)	NÜR (Germany)		HUN (Hungary)		SIL (United Kingdom)		LEC (France)		CAT (Spain)		Points

Colour	Result
Gold	Winner
Silver	Second place
Bronze	Third place
Green	Points classification
Blue	Non-points classification
Blue	Non-classified finish (NC)
Purple	Retired, not classified (Ret)
Red	Did not qualify (DNQ)
Red	Did not pre-qualify (DNPQ)
Black	Disqualified (DSQ)
White	Did not start (DNS)
White	Withdrew (WD)
White	Race cancelled (C)
Blank	Did not practice (DNP)
Blank	Did not arrive (DNA)
Blank	Excluded (EX)

- Polesitter for each race in **bold**. No points are awarded.
- Driver who recorded fastest lap denoted in italics. No points are awarded.
- Driver who retired but was classified denoted by †.
