= Anton Nebylitskiy =

Russian racing driver

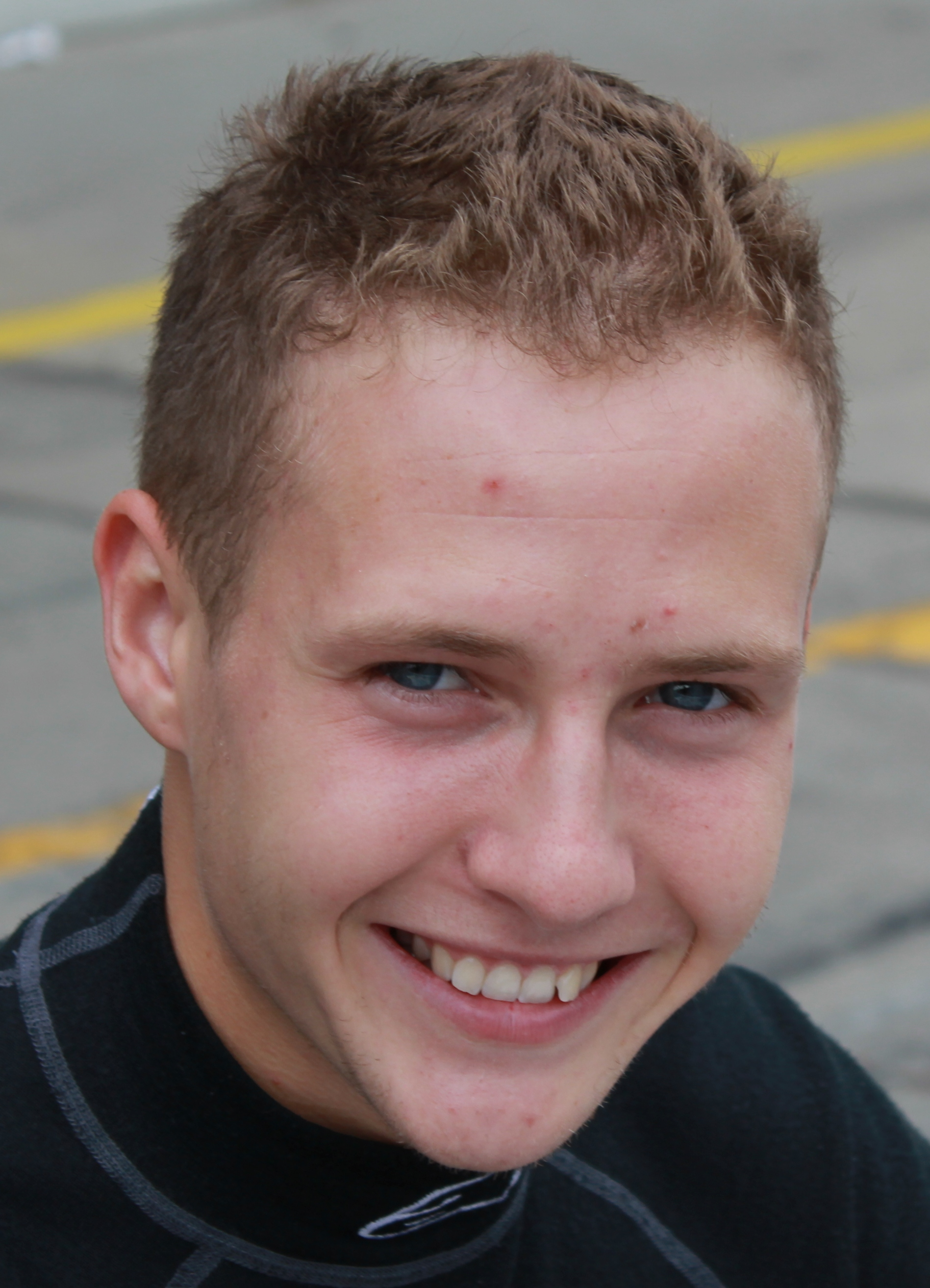
- Nebylitskiy in 2012.
- Nationality: Russian
- Born: Anton Nikitovich Nebylitskiy; 11 October 1989 (age 37) Moscow (Soviet Union)

Formula Renault 3.5 Series career
- Debut season: 2009
- Current team: Team RFR
- Car number: 18
- Former teams: Comtec Racing; KMP Group/SG Formula
- Starts: 56
- Wins: 0
- Poles: 0
- Fastest laps: 0
- Best finish: 14th in 2010

Previous series
- 2008 2006–08 2006–07 2006: Formula Renault 2.0 WEC; Eurocup Formula Renault 2.0; Formula Renault 2.0 NEC; British Formula Renault 2.0

Anton Nikitovich Nebylitskiy (Russian: Анто́н Ники́тович Небыли́цкий, IPA: [ɐnˈton nʲɪˈkʲitəvʲɪtɕ nʲɛbɨˈlʲitskʲɪj]; born 11 October 1989, in Moscow) is a Russian former professional racing driver.

== Career ==
=== Formula Renault 2.0 ===
After spending the following season on the sidelines, Nebylitskiy returned to racing in 2006 in the inaugural Formula Renault 2.0 Northern European Cup. Driving for SL Formula Racing, he finished 13th in the standings. He also took part in six Eurocup Formula Renault 2.0 races, but failed to score a point. In November of that year, Nebylitskiy also took part in the British Formula Renault 2.0 Winter series. He would have been classified 17th in the final standings, but was ineligible because he did not hold a valid MSA licence.

The following year, Nebylitskiy took part in a full Eurocup Formula Renault 2.0 season, driving the first ten races of the season with SL Formula Racing before switching to SG Formula for the final four races. Again, he failed to score a championship point. He also contested ten races of the Formula Renault 2.0 Northern European Cup, taking a best race result of sixth at Zolder to finish 22nd in the standings.

Nebylitskiy continued in the Eurocup in 2008, driving for the SG Drivers' Project team. He took a best result of seventh at the final round in Barcelona to end the season in 20th position. He also contested a full Formula Renault 2.0 West European Cup season, finishing the year in seventh place after taking a podium position at Dijon–Prenois.

=== Formula Renault 3.5 Series ===
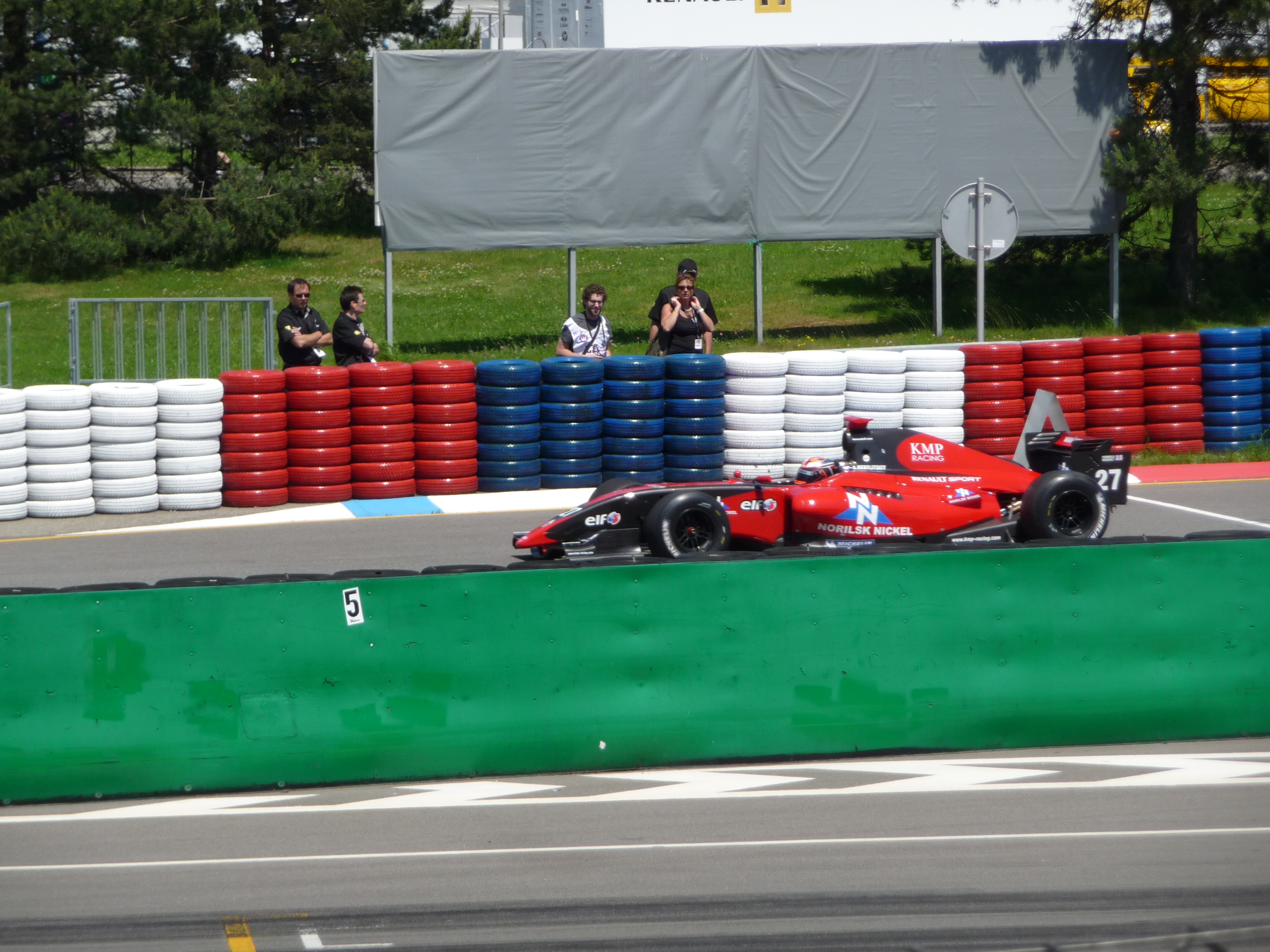
Anton Nebylitskiy at the 2010 Brno World series by Renault round

In November 2008, Nebylitskiy took part in Formula Renault 3.5 Series testing at both Paul Ricard and Valencia. After testing with three different teams, Nebylitskiy was signed by Comtec Racing to contest the 2009 season. After the second round of the season at Spa–Francorchamps, he left the team to join the newly created KMP Group/SG Formula outfit. He ended the season 29th overall, with a single hard charger point earned at the Nürburgring.

Nebylitskiy continued in the series in 2010 with new team KMP Racing. He finished in the points on eight occasions, taking a single podium place at Brno to finish in 14th place in the standings. He continued in the championship for a third season in 2011, staying with KMP Racing for a second consecutive year. However, he was replaced after the fifth round of the year at the Nürburgring by fellow Russian and 2010 series champion Mikhail Aleshin, with team boss Bruno Besson explaining that the arrival of an experienced driver would help the team's other driver, Nelson Panciatici, to move nearer the front of the grid.

== Racing record ==
=== Career results ===
Season	Series	Team	Races	Wins	Poles	F/Laps	Podiums	Points	Position
2004	Formula Russia	LOTTA Racing	?	?	?	?	?	28	6th
2006	Formula Renault 2.0 Northern European Cup	SL Formula Racing	16	0	0	0	0	116	13th
2006	Eurocup Formula Renault 2.0	SL Formula Racing	6	0	0	0	0	0	37th
2006	British Formula Renault 2.0 - Winter Series	SL Formula Racing	4	0	0	?	0	0	NC†
2007	Eurocup Formula Renault 2.0	SL Formula Racing	14	0	0	0	0	0	42nd
2007	Eurocup Formula Renault 2.0	SG Formula	14	0	0	0	0	0	42nd
2007	Formula Renault 2.0 Northern European Cup	SL Formula Racing	10	0	0	0	0	63	22nd
2008	Formula Renault 2.0 West European Cup	SG Formula	15	0	0	0	1	41	7th
2008	Eurocup Formula Renault 2.0	SG Drivers' Project	14	0	0	0	0	7	20th
2009	Formula Renault 3.5 Series	Comtec Racing	17	0	0	0	0	1	29th
2009	Formula Renault 3.5 Series	KMP Group/SG Formula	17	0	0	0	0	1	29th
2010	Formula Renault 3.5 Series	KMP Racing	17	0	0	0	1	31	14th
2011	Formula Renault 3.5 Series	KMP Racing	14	0	0	0	0	22	19th
2012	Formula Renault 3.5 Series	Team RFR	8	0	0	0	0	0	31st
2015	International GT Open	AERT	9	0	0	?	1	8	19th

† – Nebylitskiy was ineligible for the final standings due to him not holding a valid MSA licence.

=== Complete Formula Renault 2.0 NEC results ===
(key) (Races in bold indicate pole position) (Races in italics indicate fastest lap)

Year	Entrant	1	2	3	4	5	6	7	8	9	10	11	12	13	14	15	16	DC	Points
2006	SL Formula Racing	OSC; 1; 14	OSC; 2; 18	SPA; 1; 15	SPA; 2 Ret	NÜR; 1; 9	NÜR; 2; 16	ZAN; 1; 16	ZAN; 2; 11	OSC; 1; 15	OSC; 2; 13	ASS; 1; 7	ASS; 2; 6	AND; 1; 21	AND; 2; 13	SAL; 1 Ret	SAL; 2; 11	13th	116
2007	SL Formula Racing	ZAN; 1 Ret	ZAN; 2; 15	OSC; 1; 12	OSC; 2 Ret	ASS; 1 NC	ASS; 2; 11	ZOL; 1; 6	ZOL; 1 Ret	NUR; 1; 9	NUR; 2; 10	OSC; 1	OSC; 2	SPA; 1	SPA; 2	HOC; 1	HOC; 2	22nd	63

=== Complete Eurocup Formula Renault 2.0 results ===
(key) (Races in bold indicate pole position; races in italics indicate fastest lap)

Year	Entrant	1	2	3	4	5	6	7	8	9	10	11	12	13	14	DC	Points
2006	SL Formula Racing	ZOL; 1	ZOL; 2	IST; 1; 18	IST; 2; 29	MIS; 1	MIS; 2	NÜR; 1	NÜR; 2	DON; 1; 19	DON; 2 Ret	LMS; 1; 22	LMS; 2 Ret	CAT; 1	CAT; 2	38th	0
2007	SL Formula Racing	ZOL; 1; 12	ZOL; 2; 17	NÜR; 1; 14	NÜR; 2 Ret	HUN; 1; 20	HUN; 2; 23	DON; 1; 27	DON; 2; 13	MAG; 1 Ret	MAG; 2 Ret					28th	0
2007	SG Formula											EST; 1; 29	EST; 2; 17	CAT; 1; 22	CAT; 2; 33†	28th	0
2008	SG Drivers' Project	SPA; 1; 24	SPA; 2 Ret	SIL; 1; 16	SIL; 2; 22	HUN; 1 Ret	HUN; 2 Ret	NÜR; 1 Ret	NÜR; 2 Ret	LMS; 1 Ret	LMS; 2; 15	EST; 1; 26	EST; 2; 17	CAT; 1; 7	CAT; 2; 8	20th	7

=== Complete Formula Renault 3.5 Series results ===
(key) (Races in bold indicate pole position) (Races in italics indicate fastest lap) (Races with asterisk indicate most gaining positions during the race)

Year	Team	1	2	3	4	5	6	7	8	9	10	11	12	13	14	15	16	17	Pos	Points
2009	Comtec Racing	CAT; 1; 17	CAT; 2; 17†	SPA; 1; 20	SPA; 2 Ret														29th	1
2009	KMP Group/SG Formula					MON; 1; 20	HUN; 1; 19	HUN; 2 Ret	SIL; 1 Ret	SIL; 2 Ret	BUG; 1 Ret	BUG; 2 Ret	ALG; 1; 12	ALG; 2 Ret	NÜR; 1; 12*	NÜR; 2; 11	ALC; 1 Ret	ALC; 2 Ret	29th	1
2010	KMP Racing	ALC; 1 Ret	ALC; 2 Ret	SPA; 1; 10	SPA; 2 Ret	MON; 1; 17	BRN; 1; 3	BRN; 2 Ret	MAG; 1; 11	MAG; 2 Ret	HUN; 1; 10	HUN; 2; 7	HOC; 1; 10	HOC; 2 Ret	SIL; 1; 7	SIL; 2; 5	CAT; 1 Ret	CAT; 2; 7	14th	31
2011	KMP Racing	ALC; 1 Ret	ALC; 2; 6	SPA; 1 DNS	SPA; 2; 19	MNZ; 1; 19	MNZ; 2; 19	MON; 1 Ret	NÜR; 1; 8	NÜR; 2 Ret	HUN; 1	HUN; 2	SIL; 1; 15	SIL; 2; 15	LEC; 1 Ret	LEC; 2; 16	CAT; 1 Ret	CAT; 2; 5	19th	22
2012	Team RFR	ALC; 1; 13	ALC; 2; 14	MON; 1 Ret	SPA; 1 DNS	SPA; 2; 15	NÜR; 1; 20	NÜR; 2; 16	MSC; 1 Ret	MSC; 2 Ret	SIL; 1 Ret	SIL; 2 DNS	HUN; 1	HUN; 2	LEC; 1	LEC; 2	CAT; 1	CAT; 2	31st	0
