= North European Zone Formula 3 Cup =

- Category: Single-seaters
- Country: Northern Europe
- Inaugural season: 2008
- Folded: 2009
- Constructors: Dallara, ArtTech
- Engine suppliers: Opel, Fiat, Mugen Honda
- Last Drivers' champion: (Finland) Jani Tammi
- Last Teams' champion: (Finland) Oakra F3 Motorsport
- Official website: fia-nez.eu/

The North European Zone Formula 3 Cup, also known as the NEZ Formula 3 Cup, was an open wheel racing series based in Northern Europe. The series ran from 2008 to 2009. The NEZ member counties are Denmark, Estonia, Finland, Iceland, Lithuania, Latvia, Norway, Russia and Sweden.

== Scoring system ==
In each two race of the weekend, points are awarded to the top twelve finishers, with 25 points for a win. A bonus point is awarded for the fastest qualifying time and for the fastest lap of each race. The same scoring system is used in all FIA NEZ racing championships and cups.

Current NEZ Formula 3 Cup scoring system
1st	2nd	3rd	4th	5th	6th	7th	8th	9th	10th	11th	12th	Pole	Fastest lap
25	20	16	14	12	10	8	6	4	3	2	1	1	1

== Champions ==
Season	Champion	Team Champion
2008	(Russia) Vladimir Semenov	(Russia) ZyXEL RRT
2009	(Finland) Jani Tammi	(Finland) Oakra F3 Motorsport

== See also ==
- Formula Three
