= Team RFR =

(Russia) Team RFR
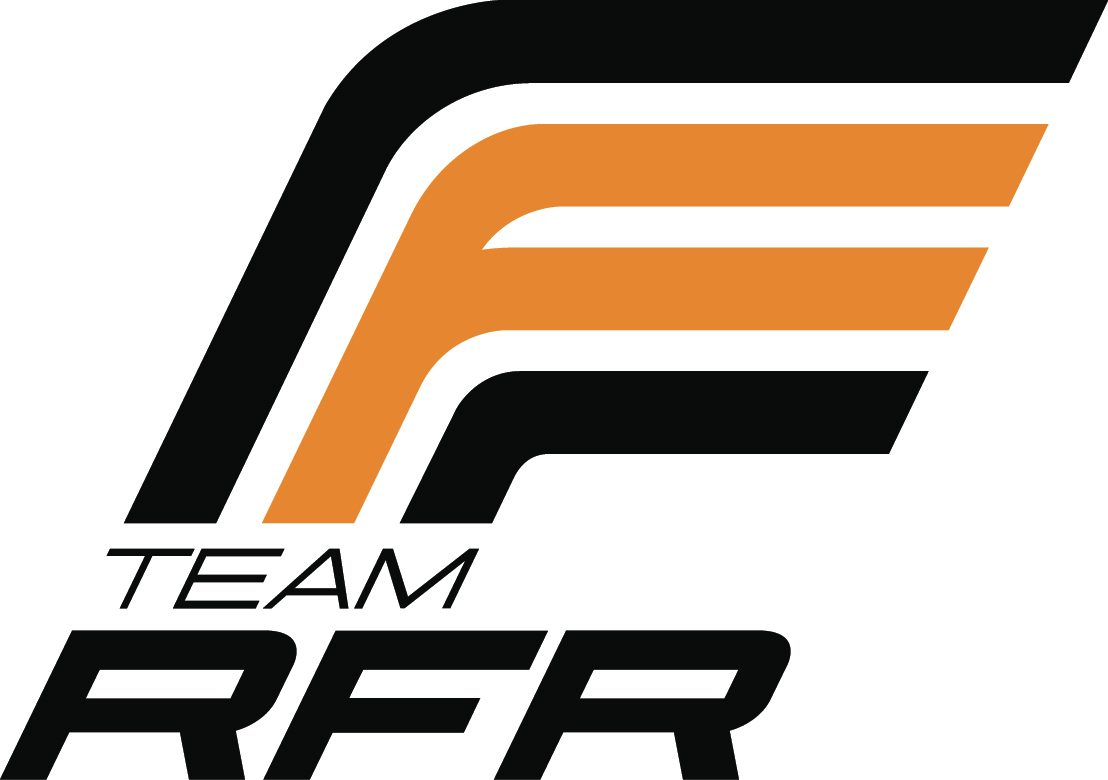
- Founded: 2009
- Base: Nogaro, France
- Team principal(s): Bruno Besson
- Former series: Formula Renault 3.5 Series
- Noted drivers: (Russia) Mikhail Aleshin (Spain) Víctor García (Russia) Anton Nebylitskiy (France) Nelson Panciatici (Finland) Aaro Vainio

Team RFR that was previously known as KMP Racing are an auto racing Russian team who made their début in the Formula Renault 3.5 Series in 2010. The team is based at Nogaro, France.

== Background ==
=== KMP Group/SG Formula ===
KMP Group are a Russian–based tour operator and travel agency, set up in 1989, with offices in Moscow, St Petersburg, Kyiv, Paris and New York.

In May 2009, they linked up with renowned French single–seater team SG Formula for an entry into the Formula Renault 3.5 Series, making their début at the third round of the season in Monaco after taking over the assets of the Belgian KTR team.

Russian driver Anton Nebylitskiy was their lead driver, with Jules Bianchi, Edoardo Mortara and Guillaume Moreau sharing the second seat during the year. The teams' best race result came courtesy of Moreau, who finished third in the second event at Portimão. They also finished the season 12th in the teams' championship with 19 points.

=== KMP Racing ===
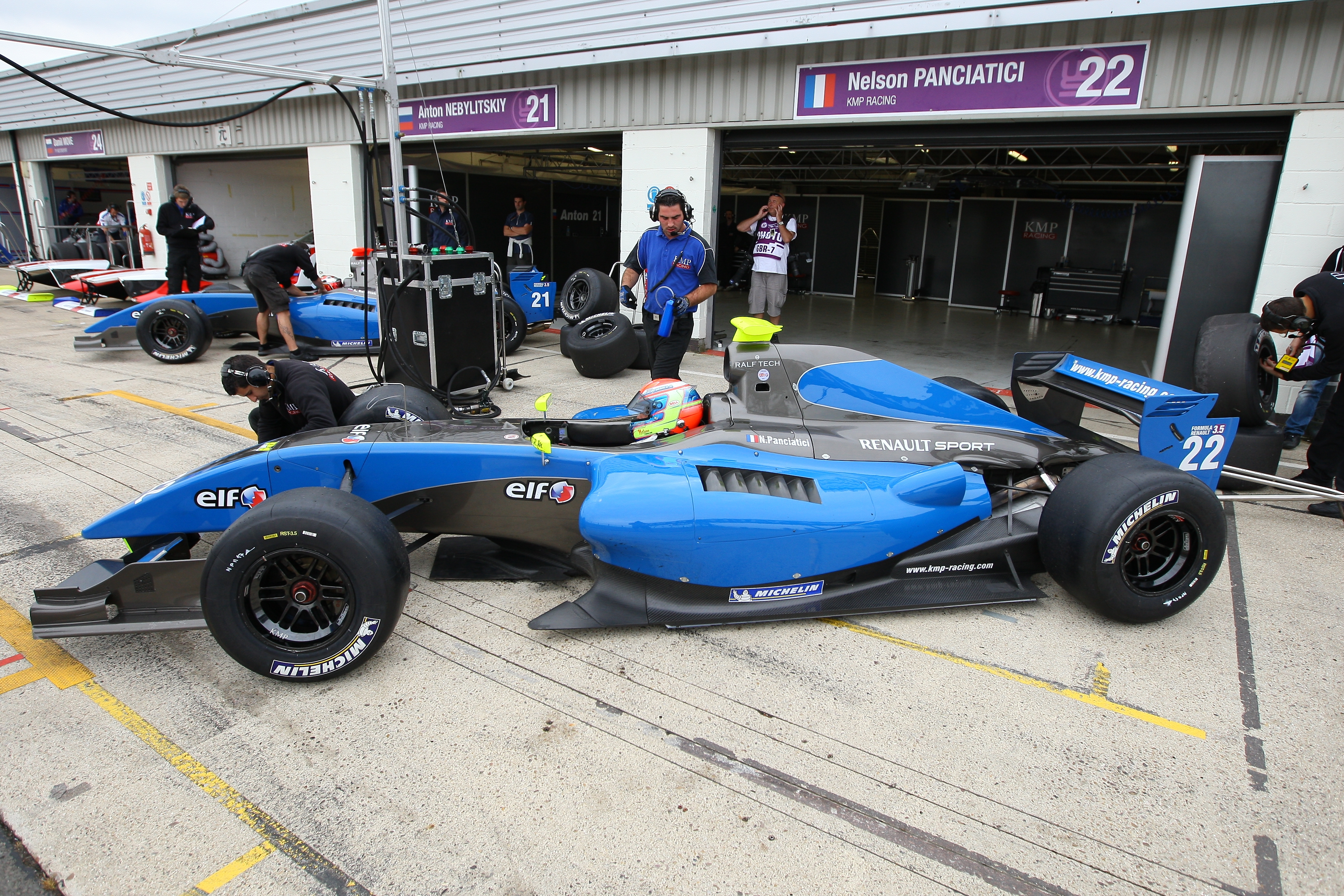
Nelson Panciatici driving for KMP Racing at the Silverstone circuit round of the World Series by Renault.

In December 2009, the Formula Renault 3.5 Series organising committee announced the thirteen teams pre–selected to compete in the 2010 season, with SG Formula and KMP Racing listed as two separate entities.

The team acquired two cars and other assets from British team Ultimate Motorsport, who left the Formula Renault 3.5 Series before the penultimate round of the 2009 season. They also entered into a sponsorship agreement with Russian–based company Norilsk Nickel and appointed former French Formula Three driver Bruno Besson as their team principal. In February 2010, it was announced that KMP had secured premises in Colomiers, France.

The team's drivers for the 2010 season were Russian Anton Nebylitskiy, who drove for Comtec Racing and KMP Group/SG Formula during the 2009 season, and British Formula 3 graduate Víctor García. Nebylitskiy took the teams' first podium finish in the opening race at Brno, finishing in third place behind Brendon Hartley and race winner Esteban Guerrieri. The team finished their first year tenth in the standings with 35 points.

Anton Nebylitskiy stayed with the team for a second season in 2011. He was joined by Nelson Panciatici.

=== Team RFR ===
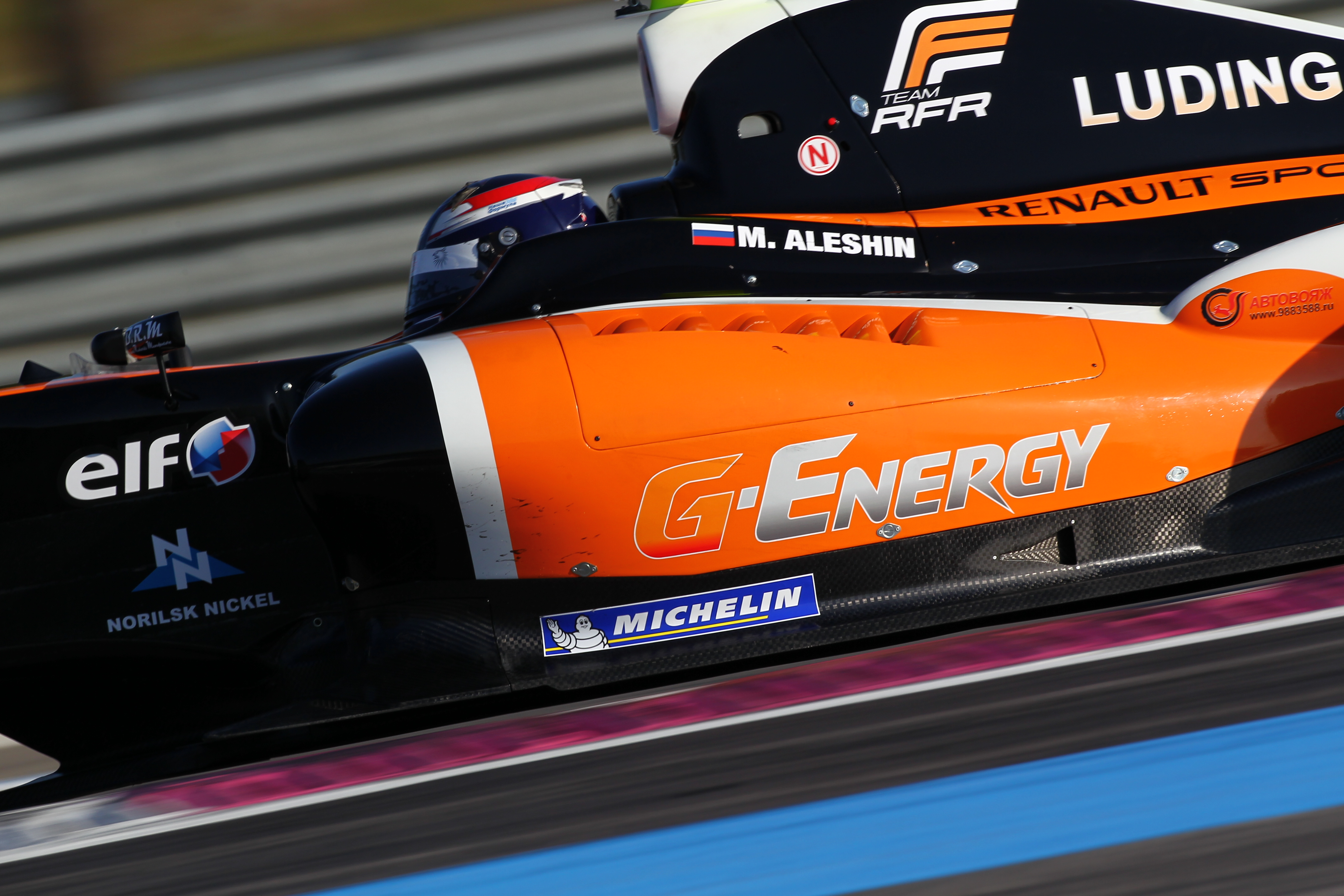
Mikhail Aleshin driving for Team RFR at the Paul Ricard Circuit round of the World Series by Renault.

Prior 2012 season the team was re-branded as Team RFR. This abbreviation stands for Russia France Racing or Russian Force Racing. The personnel was almost completely changed. 2010 Formula Renault 3.5 Series champion Mikhail Aleshin and Anton Nebylitskiy was announced as drivers for the 2012 season.
