= Mofaz Racing =

(Malaysia) Mofaz Racing
- Founded: 2009
- Team principal(s): Haji Mohamad Fauzy Abdul Hamid
- Former series: Formula Renault 3.5 Series; JK Racing Asia Series(Formula BMW Pacific)

Mofaz Racing was an auto racing team from Malaysia, which last competed in the Formula Renault 3.5 Series.

== Background ==
The Mofaz Group is a Malaysian conglomerate, established in 1977, which operates in a wide range of business sectors, including services and hospitality, international and domestic trade and corporate management.

=== Acquisition of Fortec Motorsport ===
At the beginning of 2009, the Mofaz Group bought a stake in British Formula Renault 3.5 Series team Fortec Motorsport. The new team was initially known as Mofaz Fortec Motorsport before later becoming known as Mofaz Racing.

Malaysian Fairuz Fauzy, the son of team principal Haji Mohamad Fauzy Abdul Hamid, and Estonian Sten Pentus were the teams' drivers for the 2009 season. They finished the season fifth in the Teams' standings with 121 points, with Fauzy finishing runner–up in the Drivers' championship behind Bertrand Baguette, scoring five podium positions including a win at the Hungaroring.

=== Mofaz Racing ===
On December 18, 2009, the World Series by Renault organising committee announced the thirteen teams pre–selected to compete in the 2010 season, with Fortec Motorsport and Mofaz Racing listed as two separate entries. Fortec took over the grid slot of Prema Powerteam, who decided to leave the series to concentrate on their Formula Three activities, with Mofaz Racing now a separate team in its own right.

Also in December 2009, the team announced that they would enter the Formula BMW Pacific series in 2010 after entering into a partnership with Malaysian petroleum company Petronas. The team finished the season fourth overall, taking a single race victory at the Okayama International Circuit.

In February 2010, it was announced that Mofaz Racing had entered into a collaboration with new Formula One team Lotus Racing, with the Formula Renault 3.5 Series outfit sharing the same livery and officially becoming known as the 'Lotus F1 Racing Junior Team', which was later abbreviated to Junior Lotus Racing. The team's drivers for the 2010 season were former GP2 Series and Superleague Formula driver Nelson Panciatici and Russian Daniil Move, with British driver Dean Stoneman replacing Move for the final round in Barcelona. The team finished the season in ninth place, with Panciatici their highest classified driver in 12th position, losing out on 11th place to Filip Salaquarda on countback.
