= 2010 Formula Renault 3.5 Series =

Sports season

Seasons
- ← 2009 2011 →

The 2010 Formula Renault 3.5 Series was the sixth season of the single–seater category. It began at the Ciudad del Motor de Aragón in Spain on 17 April, and ended at Circuit de Catalunya, also in Spain, on 10 October.

The Drivers' championship was won by Carlin's Mikhail Aleshin after a last–race title decider with Tech 1 Racing driver Daniel Ricciardo. The Russian claimed the title by just two points after both drivers entered the final race level on 128 points each. He received his prize Renault F1 drive on the first day of the young driver test held at the Yas Marina Circuit, Abu Dhabi on 16 November. Tech 1 Racing won the Teams' championship from Czech squad ISR Racing.

It was due to be the final season for the current Dallara chassis, which was due to be replaced by a new car, developed by Renault Sport Technologies, in time for the 2011 season. However, the series has extended the lifespan of the current car into the 2011 season to "avoid placing undue financial pressures on teams in the prevalent tough market conditions".

== Regulation changes ==
=== Technical ===
- The engines were re–tuned from 8,200 RPM to 8,500 RPM.
- Boost control was banned.

=== Sporting ===
- The duration of the two Friday practice sessions was increased from 60 minutes to 75 minutes each.
- The grid for the second race was no longer decided using the reverse grid and SuperPole system. Each meeting (with the exception of Monaco) now featured two 30–minute qualifying sessions and two races of 44 minutes + one lap.
- During the Saturday of each meeting, the cars raced in a "light-aerodynamic" configuration, which was defined by Renault Sport Technologies.

== Teams and drivers ==
R = Series rookie for 2010

Team	No.	Driver name	Status	Rounds
(Spain) International DracoRacing	1	(France) Nathanaël Berthon	R	All
(Spain) International DracoRacing	2	(Colombia) Omar Leal		All
(United Kingdom) Carlin	3	(Russia) Mikhail Aleshin		All
(United Kingdom) Carlin	4	(United States) Jake Rosenzweig	R	All
(United Kingdom) P1 Motorsport	5	(Austria) Walter Grubmüller	R	All
(United Kingdom) P1 Motorsport	6	(Czech Republic) Jan Charouz	R	1–7, 9
(United Kingdom) P1 Motorsport	6	(New Zealand) Brendon Hartley		8
(France) Tech 1 Racing	7	(New Zealand) Brendon Hartley		1–6
(France) Tech 1 Racing	7	(France) Jean-Éric Vergne	R	7–9
(France) Tech 1 Racing	8	(Australia) Daniel Ricciardo	R	All
(Malaysia) Junior Lotus Racing	9	(Russia) Daniil Move		1–8
(Malaysia) Junior Lotus Racing	9	(United Kingdom) Dean Stoneman	R	9
(Malaysia) Junior Lotus Racing	10	(France) Nelson Panciatici	R	All
(Spain) Pons Racing	11	(Italy) Federico Leo		All
(Spain) Pons Racing	12	(Italy) Daniel Zampieri	R	All
(Spain) Epsilon Euskadi	15	(Spain) Albert Costa	R	All
(Spain) Epsilon Euskadi	16	(Japan) Keisuke Kunimoto		All
(United Kingdom) Comtec Racing	17	(United Kingdom) Greg Mansell		All
(United Kingdom) Comtec Racing	18	(Monaco) Stefano Coletti	R	All
(United Kingdom) Fortec Motorsport	23	(Estonia) Sten Pentus		All
(United Kingdom) Fortec Motorsport	24	(United Kingdom) Jon Lancaster		All
(Czech Republic) ISR Racing	25	(Argentina) Esteban Guerrieri		1–2, 4–5, 7–9
(Czech Republic) ISR Racing	25	(United States) Alexander Rossi	R	3
(Czech Republic) ISR Racing	26	(Czech Republic) Filip Salaquarda		1–5, 7–9
(Russia) KMP Racing	27	(Russia) Anton Nebylitskiy		All
(Russia) KMP Racing	28	(Spain) Víctor García	R	All
(Austria) FHV Interwetten.com	29	(Spain) Bruno Méndez	R	1–8
(Austria) FHV Interwetten.com	29	(Mexico) Salvador Durán		9
(Austria) FHV Interwetten.com	30	(Spain) Sergio Canamasas	R	All

=== Driver changes ===
Changed Teams

- Esteban Guerrieri: RC Motorsport → ISR Racing
- Jon Lancaster: Comtec Racing → Fortec Motorsport
- Omar Leal: Prema Powerteam → International DracoRacing
- Daniil Move: P1 Motorsport → Junior Lotus Racing
- Anton Nebylitskiy: KMP Group/SG Formula → KMP Racing
- Filip Salaquarda: Prema Powerteam → ISR Racing

Entering/Re-Entering FR3.5

- Mikhail Aleshin: FIA Formula Two Championship (MotorSport Vision) → Carlin
- Nathanaël Berthon: Eurocup Formula Renault 2.0 & Formula Renault 2.0 West European Cup (Epsilon Euskadi) → International DracoRacing
- Sergio Canamasas: European F3 Open Championship (EmilioDeVillota.com) → FHV Interwetten.com
- Jan Charouz: Le Mans Series (Aston Martin Racing) → P1 Motorsport
- Stefano Coletti: Formula 3 Euro Series (Prema Powerteam) → Comtec Racing; Coletti raced in Monaco for Prema in 2009.
- Albert Costa: Eurocup Formula Renault 2.0 & Formula Renault 2.0 West European Cup (Epsilon Euskadi) → Epsilon Euskadi
- Víctor García: British Formula 3 Championship (Fortec Motorsport) → KMP Racing
- Walter Grubmüller: British Formula 3 Championship (Hitech Racing) → P1 Motorsport
- Bruno Méndez: European F3 Open Championship (Campos Racing) → FHV Interwetten.com; Méndez raced for RC Motorsport at Motorland Aragón in 2009.
- Nelson Panciatici: GP2 Series (Durango) & Superleague Formula (Olympique Lyonnais) → Junior Lotus Racing
- Daniel Ricciardo: British Formula 3 Championship (Carlin Motorsport) → Tech 1 Racing; Ricciardo raced in Portimão for the same team in 2009.
- Jake Rosenzweig: Formula 3 Euro Series (Carlin Motorsport) → Carlin
- Alexander Rossi: GP3 Series (ART Grand Prix) → ISR Racing
- Dean Stoneman: FIA Formula Two Championship (MotorSport Vision) → Junior Lotus Racing
- Jean-Éric Vergne: British Formula 3 Championship (Carlin) → Tech 1 Racing
- Daniel Zampieri: Italian Formula Three Championship (BVM – Target Racing) → Pons Racing

Leaving FR3.5

- Jaime Alguersuari: Carlin Motorsport → Formula One (Scuderia Toro Rosso)
- Bertrand Baguette: International DracoRacing → IndyCar Series (Conquest Racing)
- Marco Barba: International DracoRacing → European F3 Open Championship (Cedars Motorsport)
- Jules Bianchi: KMP Group/SG Formula → GP2 Series (ART Grand Prix)
- Max Chilton: Comtec Racing → GP2 Series (Ocean Racing Technology)
- Dani Clos: Epsilon Euskadi → GP2 Series (Racing Engineering)
- Chris van der Drift: Epsilon Euskadi → Superleague Formula (Olympiacos CFP)
- Fairuz Fauzy: Mofaz Racing → Formula One (Lotus Racing – Test & Reserve driver)
- Tobias Hegewald: Interwetten.com Racing → GP3 Series (RSC Mücke Motorsport)
- Michael Herck: Interwetten.com Racing → GP2 Series (David Price Racing)
- John Martin: Comtec Racing → Superleague Formula (Atlético Madrid)
- Mihai Marinescu: Interwetten.com Racing → FIA Formula Two Championship
- Alexandre Marsoin: Comtec Racing → unknown
- Marcos Martínez: Pons Racing → Superleague Formula (Sevilla FC)
- Guillaume Moreau: KMP Group/SG Formula → Le Mans Series (OAK Racing)
- Edoardo Mortara: Tech 1 Racing → Formula 3 Euro Series (Signature)
- Charles Pic: Tech 1 Racing → GP2 Series (Arden International)
- Frankie Provenzano: Prema Powerteam → unknown
- Pasquale Di Sabatino: RC Motorsport → Italian Formula Three Championship (Alan Racing)
- Oliver Turvey: Carlin Motorsport → GP2 Series (iSport International)
- Alberto Valerio: Comtec Racing → GP2 Series (Scuderia Coloni)
- Adrián Vallés: Epsilon Euskadi → Superleague Formula (Sporting CP)
- James Walker: P1 Motorsport → Superleague Formula (Liverpool F.C.)
- Adrian Zaugg: Interwetten.com Racing → Auto GP (Trident Racing)

=== Team changes ===
- It was announced in December 2009 that Prema Powerteam would be leaving the series to concentrate on their programs in the Formula 3 Euro Series and Italian Formula Three. Their slot was taken by Fortec Motorsport.
- SG Formula and KMP Group had split to form two new teams. However, SG Formula pulled out of the series just a week before the opening round.
- ISR Racing took over the RC Motorsport team's entry.
- Interwetten.com Racing, managed by Motorsport Consulting GmbH, were not selected for the series originally. They were later accepted as FHV Interwetten.com, managed by FHV GmbH, with Sergio Canamasas and Bruno Méndez driving.

== Race calendar and results ==
The calendar for the 2010 season was announced on 25 October 2009, the last day of the 2009 season. Eight of the nine rounds formed meetings of the 2010 World Series by Renault season, with an additional round in support of the Monaco Grand Prix.

Round		Circuit	Date	Pole position	Fastest lap	Winning driver	Winning team	Rookie winner
1	R1	(Spain) Ciudad del Motor de Aragón, Alcañiz	17 April	(Australia) Daniel Ricciardo	(Italy) Daniel Zampieri	(Russia) Mikhail Aleshin	(United Kingdom) Carlin	(Italy) Daniel Zampieri
1	R2	(Spain) Ciudad del Motor de Aragón, Alcañiz	18 April	(Australia) Daniel Ricciardo	(Estonia) Sten Pentus	(Estonia) Sten Pentus	(United Kingdom) Fortec Motorsport	(Australia) Daniel Ricciardo
2	R1	(Belgium) Circuit de Spa-Francorchamps	1 May	(Russia) Mikhail Aleshin	(New Zealand) Brendon Hartley	(Russia) Mikhail Aleshin	(United Kingdom) Carlin	(Monaco) Stefano Coletti
2	R2	(Belgium) Circuit de Spa-Francorchamps	2 May	(United States) Jake Rosenzweig	(Argentina) Esteban Guerrieri	(Argentina) Esteban Guerrieri	(Czech Republic) ISR Racing	(Italy) Daniel Zampieri
3	R1	Circuit de Monaco, Monte Carlo	16 May	(Australia) Daniel Ricciardo	(New Zealand) Brendon Hartley	(Australia) Daniel Ricciardo	(France) Tech 1 Racing	(Australia) Daniel Ricciardo
4	R1	(Czech Republic) Masaryk Circuit, Brno	5 June	(Czech Republic) Filip Salaquarda	(Russia) Mikhail Aleshin	(Argentina) Esteban Guerrieri	(Czech Republic) ISR Racing	(Czech Republic) Jan Charouz
4	R2	(Czech Republic) Masaryk Circuit, Brno	6 June	(Czech Republic) Filip Salaquarda	(Australia) Daniel Ricciardo	(Argentina) Esteban Guerrieri	(Czech Republic) ISR Racing	(France) Nathanaël Berthon
5	R1	(France) Circuit de Nevers Magny-Cours	19 June	(Argentina) Esteban Guerrieri	(Estonia) Sten Pentus	(Russia) Mikhail Aleshin	(United Kingdom) Carlin	(Monaco) Stefano Coletti
5	R2	(France) Circuit de Nevers Magny-Cours	20 June	(Australia) Daniel Ricciardo	(Australia) Daniel Ricciardo	(France) Nathanaël Berthon	(Spain) International DracoRacing	(France) Nathanaël Berthon
6	R1	(Hungary) Hungaroring, Budapest	3 July	(Australia) Daniel Ricciardo	(Australia) Daniel Ricciardo	(Australia) Daniel Ricciardo	(France) Tech 1 Racing	(Australia) Daniel Ricciardo
6	R2	(Hungary) Hungaroring, Budapest	4 July	(Estonia) Sten Pentus	(Russia) Mikhail Aleshin	(Estonia) Sten Pentus	(United Kingdom) Fortec Motorsport	(Spain) Albert Costa
7	R1	(Germany) Hockenheimring	4 September	(Australia) Daniel Ricciardo	(Argentina) Esteban Guerrieri	(Australia) Daniel Ricciardo	(France) Tech 1 Racing	(Australia) Daniel Ricciardo
7	R2	(Germany) Hockenheimring	5 September	(Argentina) Esteban Guerrieri	(Argentina) Esteban Guerrieri	(Argentina) Esteban Guerrieri	(Czech Republic) ISR Racing	(Monaco) Stefano Coletti
8	R1	(United Kingdom) Silverstone Circuit	18 September	(United Kingdom) Jon Lancaster	(United Kingdom) Jon Lancaster	(France) Jean-Éric Vergne	(France) Tech 1 Racing	(France) Jean-Éric Vergne
8	R2	(United Kingdom) Silverstone Circuit	19 September	(Australia) Daniel Ricciardo	(United Kingdom) Jon Lancaster	(Argentina) Esteban Guerrieri	(Czech Republic) ISR Racing	(Australia) Daniel Ricciardo
9	R1	(Spain) Circuit de Catalunya, Barcelona	9 October	(Australia) Daniel Ricciardo	(Australia) Daniel Ricciardo	(Australia) Daniel Ricciardo	(France) Tech 1 Racing	(Australia) Daniel Ricciardo
9	R2	(Spain) Circuit de Catalunya, Barcelona	10 October	(Argentina) Esteban Guerrieri	(Argentina) Esteban Guerrieri	(Argentina) Esteban Guerrieri	(Czech Republic) ISR Racing	(France) Jean-Éric Vergne

== Season results ==
- Points for both championships were awarded as follows:

1st	2nd	3rd	4th	5th	6th	7th	8th	9th	10th
15	12	10	8	6	5	4	3	2	1

With each race having an individual qualifying session, the four–point bonus for pole position was removed. Also removed from the scoring system was the point for the driver who progressed the most places in each race.

=== Drivers' Championship ===
Pos	Driver	ARA (Spain)		SPA (Belgium)		MON (Monaco)	BRN (Czech Republic)		MAG (France)		HUN (Hungary)		HOC (Germany)		SIL (United Kingdom)		CAT (Spain)		Points
1	(Russia) Mikhail Aleshin	1	11	**1**	4	2	Ret	9	1	4	2	3	5	4	6	11	2	3	138
2	(Australia) Daniel Ricciardo	**3**	**2**	13	5	**1**	12	5	6	**2**	**1**	6	**1**	11	Ret	**2**	**1**	4	136
3	(Argentina) Esteban Guerrieri	Ret	Ret	DNS	1		1	1	**2**	10			2	**1**	DSQ	1	4	**1**	123
4	(Estonia) Sten Pentus	Ret	1	2	13	6	6	Ret	7	8	3	**1**	Ret	6	15	7	13	Ret	78
5	(Spain) Albert Costa	Ret	4	4	19	3	18	10	8	5	6	2	8	17	2	8	5	10	78
6	(Monaco) Stefano Coletti	Ret	13	3	3	5	9	12	3	7	Ret	10	7	2	3	12	10	5	76
7	(France) Nathanaël Berthon	Ret	3	Ret	10	Ret	8	2	9	1	Ret	13	9	3	Ret	Ret	6	12	60
8	(France) Jean-Éric Vergne												11	5	1	3	3	2	53
9	(Italy) Daniel Zampieri	2	Ret	12	2	Ret	Ret	15	5	11	13	4	4	DSQ	EX	6	Ret	DSQ	51
10	(New Zealand) Brendon Hartley	6	6	Ret	6	4	2	6	Ret	Ret	4	9			Ret	15			50
11	(Czech Republic) Filip Salaquarda	Ret	Ret	DNS	15	8	**15**	**3**	15	3			Ret	7	5	4	8	19	44
12	(France) Nelson Panciatici	5	9	Ret	Ret	9	13	8	4	9	5	12	Ret	12	4	9	16	6	44
13	(United Kingdom) Jon Lancaster	4	Ret	9	7	7	10	7	10	Ret	Ret	22	3	8	**13**	17	14	9	39
14	(Russia) Anton Nebylitskiy	Ret	Ret	10	Ret	17	3	Ret	11	Ret	10	7	10	Ret	7	5	Ret	7	31
15	(United Kingdom) Greg Mansell	8	Ret	5	14	15	11	14	18	12	Ret	5	6	Ret	10	Ret	9	16	23
16	(Austria) Walter Grubmüller	10†	8	7	18	11	14	4	Ret	16	11	11	Ret	Ret	Ret	14	15	13	16
17	(Italy) Federico Leo	Ret	5	6	17	Ret	Ret	18	Ret	Ret	Ret	17	16	10	11	18	7	15	16
18	(Czech Republic) Jan Charouz	Ret	DSQ	8	9	14	7	11	20	17	7	21	Ret	15			Ret	8	16
19	(United States) Jake Rosenzweig	7	12	14	**8**	13	16	16	13	13	8	8	Ret	DNS	14	20	12	11	13
20	(Colombia) Omar Leal	Ret	Ret	11	12	16	4	13	Ret	19	Ret	16	13	9	Ret	10	Ret	Ret	11
21	(Russia) Daniil Move	9	7	16	20	10	Ret	Ret	12	Ret	Ret	14	17	16	9	19			9
22	(Japan) Keisuke Kunimoto	Ret	14	15	16	18	5	Ret	16	18	9	15	12	13	12	13	11	18	8
23	(Spain) Bruno Méndez	Ret	15	DNS	11	Ret	Ret	19	14	6	14	19	14	14	Ret	16			5
24	(Spain) Víctor García	Ret	10	Ret	Ret	12	Ret	20	19†	15	12	18	Ret	18	8	21	Ret	Ret	4
25	(Spain) Sergio Canamasas	Ret	16	DNS	Ret	19	17	17	17	14	Ret	20	15	Ret	Ret	Ret	17	17	0
26	(United Kingdom) Dean Stoneman																18	14	0
	(Mexico) Salvador Durán																NC	Ret	0
	(United States) Alexander Rossi					Ret													0
Pos	Driver	ALC (Spain)		SPA (Belgium)		MON (Monaco)	BRN (Czech Republic)		MAG (France)		HUN (Hungary)		HOC (Germany)		SIL (United Kingdom)		CAT (Spain)		Points

Colour	Result
Gold	Winner
Silver	Second place
Bronze	Third place
Green	Points classification
Blue	Non-points classification
Blue	Non-classified finish (NC)
Purple	Retired, not classified (Ret)
Red	Did not qualify (DNQ)
Red	Did not pre-qualify (DNPQ)
Black	Disqualified (DSQ)
White	Did not start (DNS)
White	Withdrew (WD)
White	Race cancelled (C)
Blank	Did not practice (DNP)
Blank	Did not arrive (DNA)
Blank	Excluded (EX)

**Bold** – Pole
Italics – Fastest Lap
† – Retired, but classified

=== Teams' Championship ===
Pos	Team	Car No.	ALC (Spain)		SPA (Belgium)		MON (Monaco)	BRN (Czech Republic)		MAG (France)		HUN (Hungary)		HOC (Germany)		SIL (United Kingdom)		CAT (Spain)		Points
1	(France) Tech 1 Racing	7	6	6	Ret	6	4	2	6	Ret	Ret	4	9	11	5	1	3	3	2	239
1	(France) Tech 1 Racing	8	**3**	**2**	13	5	**1**	12	5	6	**2**	**1**	6	**1**	11	Ret	**2**	**1**	4	239
2	(Czech Republic) ISR Racing	25	Ret	Ret	DNS	1	Ret	1	1	**2**	10			2	**1**	DSQ	1	4	**1**	167
2	(Czech Republic) ISR Racing	26	Ret	Ret	DNS	15	8	**15**	**3**	15	3			Ret	7	5	4	8	19	167
3	(United Kingdom) Carlin	3	1	11	**1**	4	2	Ret	9	1	4	2	3	5	4	6	11	2	3	151
3	(United Kingdom) Carlin	4	7	12	14	**8**	13	16	16	13	13	8	8	Ret	DNS	14	20	12	11	151
4	(United Kingdom) Fortec Motorsport	23	Ret	1	2	13	6	6	Ret	7	8	3	**1**	Ret	6	15	7	13	Ret	117
4	(United Kingdom) Fortec Motorsport	24	4	Ret	9	7	7	10	7	10	Ret	Ret	22	3	8	**13**	17	14	9	117
5	(United Kingdom) Comtec Racing	17	8	Ret	5	14	15	11	14	18	12	Ret	5	6	Ret	10	Ret	9	16	99
5	(United Kingdom) Comtec Racing	18	Ret	13	3	3	5	9	12	3	7	Ret	10	7	2	3	12	10	5	99
6	(Spain) Epsilon Euskadi	15	Ret	4	4	19	3	18	10	8	5	6	2	8	17	2	8	5	10	86
6	(Spain) Epsilon Euskadi	16	Ret	14	15	16	18	5	Ret	16	18	9	15	12	13	12	13	11	18	86
7	(Spain) International DracoRacing	1	Ret	3	Ret	10	Ret	8	2	9	1	Ret	13	9	3	Ret	Ret	6	12	71
7	(Spain) International DracoRacing	2	Ret	Ret	11	12	16	4	13	Ret	19	Ret	16	13	9	Ret	10	Ret	Ret	71
8	(Spain) Pons Racing	11	Ret	5	6	17	Ret	Ret	18	Ret	Ret	Ret	17	16	10	11	18	7	15	67
8	(Spain) Pons Racing	12	2	Ret	12	2	Ret	Ret	15	5	11	13	4	4	DSQ	EX	6	Ret	DSQ	67
9	(Malaysia) Junior Lotus Racing	9	9	7	16	20	10	Ret	Ret	12	Ret	Ret	14	17	16	9	19	18	6	53
9	(Malaysia) Junior Lotus Racing	10	5	9	Ret	Ret	9	13	8	4	9	5	12	Ret	12	4	9	16	14	53
10	(Russia) KMP Racing	27	Ret	Ret	10	Ret	17	3	Ret	11	Ret	10	7	10	Ret	7	5	Ret	7	35
10	(Russia) KMP Racing	28	Ret	10	Ret	Ret	12	Ret	20	19†	15	12	18	Ret	18	8	21	Ret	Ret	35
11	(United Kingdom) P1 Motorsport	5	10†	8	7	18	11	14	4	Ret	16	11	11	Ret	Ret	Ret	14	15	13	32
11	(United Kingdom) P1 Motorsport	6	Ret	DSQ	8	9	14	7	11	20	17	7	21	Ret	15	Ret	15	Ret	8	32
12	(Austria) FHV Interwetten.com	29	Ret	15	DNS	11	Ret	Ret	19	14	6	14	19	14	14	Ret	16	NC	Ret	5
12	(Austria) FHV Interwetten.com	30	Ret	16	DNS	Ret	19	17	17	17	14	Ret	20	15	Ret	Ret	Ret	17	17	5
Pos	Team	Car No.	ALC (Spain)		SPA (Belgium)		MON (Monaco)	BRN (Czech Republic)		MAG (France)		HUN (Hungary)		HOC (Germany)		SIL (United Kingdom)		CAT (Spain)		Points

Colour	Result
Gold	Winner
Silver	Second place
Bronze	Third place
Green	Points classification
Blue	Non-points classification
Blue	Non-classified finish (NC)
Purple	Retired, not classified (Ret)
Red	Did not qualify (DNQ)
Red	Did not pre-qualify (DNPQ)
Black	Disqualified (DSQ)
White	Did not start (DNS)
White	Withdrew (WD)
White	Race cancelled (C)
Blank	Did not practice (DNP)
Blank	Did not arrive (DNA)
Blank	Excluded (EX)

- Polesitter for each race in **bold**. No points are awarded.
- Driver who recorded fastest lap denoted in italics. No points are awarded.
- Driver who retired but was classified denoted by †.
