= 2007 Eurocup Formula Renault 2.0 =

Motor racing competition

Seasons
- ← 2006 2008 →

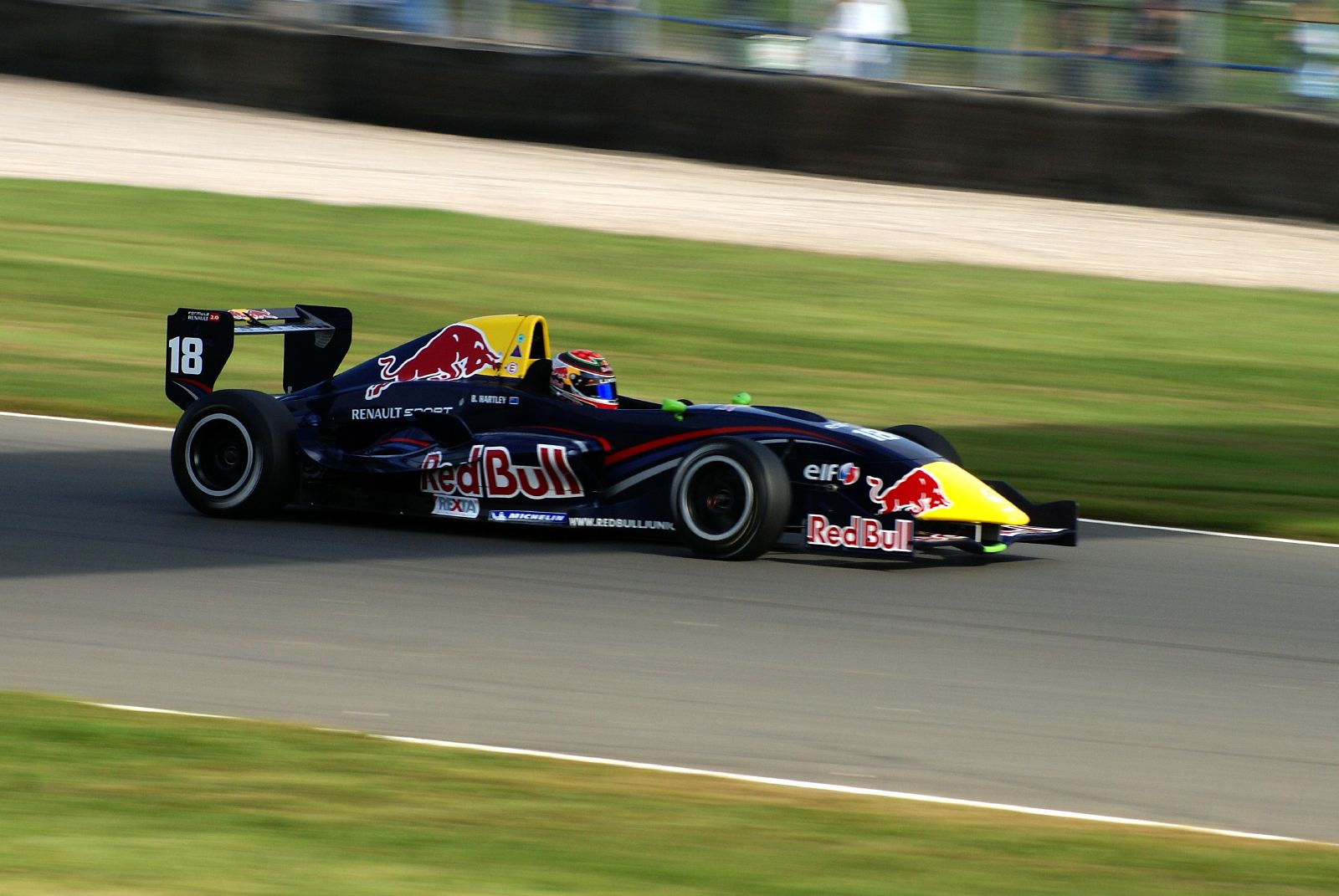
New Zealand's Brendon Hartley won the drivers title.

The 2007 Eurocup Formula Renault 2.0 season was the seventeenth Eurocup Formula Renault 2.0 season. The season began at Zolder on 21 April and finished at Barcelona on 28 October, after fourteen rounds.

The title was claimed by Epsilon RedBull driver Brendon Hartley with a round to spare. Hartley took four race wins during the season, two of which coming in the opening round at Zolder. He also took four further podium finishes en route to a 32-point championship win over Jon Lancaster. SG Formula's driver eventually ended the season also with four victories in two final rounds at Estoril and Barcelona.

Lancaster's teammate Charles Pic finished in third position, taking victory at the Nürburgring. He finished 17 points clear of Epsilon Euskadi's Stefano Coletti, who took win at the Hungaroring. Other victories were taken by Prema Powerteam's Henkie Waldschmidt at the Nürburgring and guest driver Mathieu Arzeno, who won both Magny-Cours races.

== Teams and drivers ==
- Guest entries are listed in italics.

2007 Entry List
Team	No.	Driver name	Class	Rounds
(France) SG Formula	1	(France) Nelson Panciatici		1–3
(France) SG Formula	1	(France) Edouard Texte		5
(France) SG Formula	1	(Italy) Fabio Onidi		6–7
(France) SG Formula	2	(France) Charles Pic	J	All
(France) SG Drivers Project	3	(United Kingdom) Jon Lancaster		All
(France) SG Drivers Project	4	(France) Alexandre Marsoin	J	All
(France) SG Drivers Project	43	(France) Jules Bianchi	J	2–3, 7
(France) SG Drivers Project	52	(Russia) Anton Nebylitskiy	J	All
(Germany) Motopark Academy	5	(United Kingdom) Oliver Oakes		All
(Germany) Motopark Academy	6	(Germany) Frank Kechele		All
(Germany) Motorsport Arena	7	(Italy) Fabio Onidi		1–5
(Germany) Motorsport Arena	7	(Portugal) Tiago Petiz		6
(Germany) Motorsport Arena	7	(Poland) Jakub Giermaziak		7
(Germany) Motorsport Arena	8	(Germany) Tobias Hegewald	J	All
(Switzerland) Jenzer Motorsport	9	(United Kingdom) Oliver Turvey		All
(Switzerland) Jenzer Motorsport	10	(Spain) Roberto Merhi	J	All
(Switzerland) Jenzer Motorsport	11	(Switzerland) Fabio Leimer	J	All
(Spain) Epsilon Euskadi	12	(Spain) Miquel Julià Perello		All
(Spain) Epsilon Euskadi	14	(Spain) Pablo Montilla	J	All
(Spain) Epsilon Euskadi	15	(Monaco) Stefano Coletti	J	All
(Spain) Epsilon RedBull	16	(Finland) Mika Mäki		All
(Spain) Epsilon RedBull	18	(New Zealand) Brendon Hartley	J	All
(Spain) Epsilon RedBull	19	(Spain) Jaime Alguersuari	J	All
(Italy) Cram Competition	20	(San Marino) Nicola Zonzini	J	2–3, 7
(Italy) Cram Competition	20	(Italy) Sergio Campana		5
(Italy) Cram Competition	21	(Italy) Daniel Zampieri	J	All
(Italy) Cram Competition	22	(Italy) Giovanni Nava	J	1–2
(Italy) Cram Competition	22	(Italy) Federico Muggia		4
(Italy) Cram Competition	22	(France) Pierre Combot	J	5, 7
(Italy) Prema Powerteam	23	(Italy) Andrea Caldarelli	J	All
(Italy) Prema Powerteam	24	(United Kingdom) Martin Plowman		All
(Italy) Prema Powerteam	25	(Netherlands) Henkie Waldschmidt		All
(Italy) BVM Minardi Team	26	(Brazil) Felipe Lapenna		1–3
(Italy) BVM Minardi Team	26	(Brazil) César Ramos	J	4–6
(Italy) BVM Minardi Team	27	(Finland) Markus Niemelä		1–3
(Italy) BVM Minardi Team	27	(United Kingdom) Adrian Quaife-Hobbs	J	4–7
(Italy) BVM Minardi Team	44	(Bulgaria) Simeon Ivanov	J	2–3, 7
(Romania) District Racing	28	(Spain) Aleix Alcaraz	J	All
(Romania) District Racing	29	(Romania) Mihai Marinescu	J	All
(Spain) Omicron Racing	30	(Argentina) Facundo Crovo		1–2, 4–5
(Spain) Omicron Racing	30	(Spain) Jaime Pintanez		6
(Spain) Omicron Racing	31	(Andorra) Francesc Moreno	J	All
(Spain) Omicron Racing	32	(Portugal) Tiago Petiz		1–5
(Spain) Omicron Racing	32	(Germany) Pascal Kochem		6–7
(Belgium) Boutsen Energy Racing	33	(Monaco) Stéphane Richelmi	J	All
(Belgium) Boutsen Energy Racing	34	(Switzerland) Jonathan Hirschi		1–2
(Belgium) Boutsen Energy Racing	34	(France) Pierre Combot		3
(Belgium) Boutsen Energy Racing	34	(France) Nelson Panciatici		4–7
(Belgium) Boutsen Energy Racing	48	(France) Nelson Lukes		5
(Germany) SL Formula Racing	35	(Russia) Anton Nebylitskiy	J	1–5
(Germany) SL Formula Racing	36	(Brazil) Pedro Nunes		1–5
(Germany) SL Formula Racing	41	(Poland) Natalia Kowalska	J	2
(Germany) SL Formula Racing	42	(Russia) David Sigachev	J	2
(United Kingdom) Carlin Motorsport	37	(United Kingdom) Alexander Khateeb		1–2
(United Kingdom) Carlin Motorsport	37	(South Africa) Jimmy Auby		3
(United Kingdom) Carlin Motorsport	37	(Lebanon) Khalil Beschir		4
(United Kingdom) Carlin Motorsport	42	(Lebanon) Joe Ghanem	J	1–4
(France) Graff Racing	39	(France) Tristan Vautier	J	1–2, 5
(France) Graff Racing	40	(Switzerland) Gary Hirsch		1–2, 5
(Austria) Steiner Motorsport	45	(Austria) Bianca Steiner	J	3
(France) TCS Racing	46	(France) Nicolas Marroc		5, 7
(France) Epsilon Sport Team	49	(France) Mathieu Arzeno		5, 7
(Italy) RP Motorsport	50	(Germany) Patrick Kronenberger	J	6–7
(Italy) RP Motorsport	51	(Australia) Daniel Ricciardo		6–7

Icon	Class
J	Junior Class

== Calendar ==
Round		Circuit	Date	Pole position	Fastest lap	Winning driver	Winning team
1	R1	(Belgium) Circuit Zolder	21 April	(New Zealand) Brendon Hartley	(New Zealand) Brendon Hartley	(New Zealand) Brendon Hartley	(Spain) Epsilon RedBull
1	R2	(Belgium) Circuit Zolder	22 April		(New Zealand) Brendon Hartley	(New Zealand) Brendon Hartley	(Spain) Epsilon RedBull
2	R1	(Germany) Nürburgring	5 May	(France) Charles Pic	(United Kingdom) Oliver Oakes	(Netherlands) Henkie Waldschmidt	(Italy) Prema Powerteam
2	R2	(Germany) Nürburgring	6 May		(France) Charles Pic	(France) Charles Pic	(France) SG Formula
3	R1	(Hungary) Hungaroring	14 July	(France) Jules Bianchi	(New Zealand) Brendon Hartley	(New Zealand) Brendon Hartley	(Spain) Epsilon RedBull
3	R2	(Hungary) Hungaroring	15 July		(France) Jules Bianchi	(Monaco) Stefano Coletti	(Spain) Epsilon Euskadi
4	R1	(United Kingdom) Donington Park	8 September	(United Kingdom) Jon Lancaster	(Switzerland) Fabio Leimer	(United Kingdom) Jon Lancaster	(France) SG Formula
4	R2	(United Kingdom) Donington Park	9 September		(Germany) Frank Kechele	(New Zealand) Brendon Hartley	(Spain) Epsilon RedBull
5	R1	(France) Circuit de Nevers Magny-Cours	22 September	(New Zealand) Brendon Hartley	(Monaco) Stefano Coletti	(France) Mathieu Arzeno	(Spain) Epsilon Euskadi
5	R2	(France) Circuit de Nevers Magny-Cours	23 September		(New Zealand) Brendon Hartley	(France) Mathieu Arzeno	(Spain) Epsilon Euskadi
6	R1	(Portugal) Circuito do Estoril	20 October	(United Kingdom) Jon Lancaster	(United Kingdom) Jon Lancaster	(United Kingdom) Jon Lancaster	(France) SG Formula
6	R2	(Portugal) Circuito do Estoril	21 October		(United Kingdom) Jon Lancaster	(United Kingdom) Jon Lancaster	(France) SG Formula
7	R1	(Spain) Circuit de Catalunya, Barcelona	27 October	(New Zealand) Brendon Hartley	(United Kingdom) Jon Lancaster	(United Kingdom) Jon Lancaster	(France) SG Formula
7	R2	(Spain) Circuit de Catalunya, Barcelona	28 October		(United Kingdom) Jon Lancaster	(United Kingdom) Jon Lancaster	(France) SG Formula

== Championship standings ==
=== Drivers ===
Points are awarded to the drivers as follows:

Position	1	2	3	4	5	6	7	8	9	10	PP*
Points	15	12	10	8	6	5	4	3	2	1	1

* – only awarded to race one polesitters

Pos	Driver	ZOL (Belgium)		NÜR (Germany)		HUN (Hungary)		DON (United Kingdom)		MAG (France)		EST (Portugal)		CAT (Spain)		Points
Pos	Driver	1	2	3	4	5	6	7	8	9	10	11	12	13	14	Points
1	(New Zealand) Brendon Hartley **J**	**1**	1	Ret	8	1	5	2	1	**Ret**	3	3	3	**4**	5	134
2	(United Kingdom) Jon Lancaster	Ret	26	Ret	11	2	25	**1**	4	11	13	**1**	1	1	1	102
3	(France) Charles Pic **J**	10	28	**2**	1	6	Ret	10	Ret	2	10	2	8	3	3	88
4	(Monaco) Stefano Coletti **J**	Ret	5	Ret	Ret	Ret	1	3	2	4	27†	Ret	7	6	4	71
5	(Spain) Jaime Alguersuari **J**	4	23	10	9	Ret	4	5	Ret	6	6	5	27†	2	2	67
6	(Germany) Frank Kechele	8	6	4	4	4	6	6	16	3	29	7	10	7	8	67
7	(Netherlands) Henkie Waldschmidt	DSQ	2	1	DSQ	7	10	14	Ret	17	8	4	4	15	12	52
8	(United Kingdom) Oliver Turvey	6	4	7	3	5	9	18	12	7	4	11	13	10	DNS	51
9	(Finland) Mika Mäki	Ret	13	3	2	10	Ret	13	5	15	20	6	2	32	6	46
10	(France) Nelson Panciatici	3	Ret	9	14	Ret	3	8	3	Ret	7	10	11	8	Ret	44
11	(Romania) Mihai Marinescu **J**	16	NC	5	Ret	3	8	9	8	31†	DSQ	8	5	9	10	37
12	(United Kingdom) Oliver Oakes	7	7	6	10	11	16	11	7	8	5	14	14	17	17	32
13	(Germany) Tobias Hegewald **J**	9	16	8	6	15	17	15	14	21	2	22	20	13	22	25
14	(France) Alexandre Marsoin **J**	Ret	11	27†	18	16	11	4	6	20	17	13	6	5	11	25
15	(France) Tristan Vautier **J**	2	3	19	19					13	Ret					22
16	(Finland) Markus Niemelä	5	9	23	Ret	Ret	2									20
17	(Switzerland) Fabio Leimer **J**	18	12	12	7	19	19	7	Ret	5	28†	16	24	21	32	17
18	(Spain) Roberto Merhi **J**	13	10	Ret	5	21	15	16	Ret	16	9	9	28	11	6	16
19	(Spain) Aleix Alcaraz **J**	11	Ret	Ret	Ret	12	7	19	17	12	23	15	9	16	13	7
20	(Italy) Fabio Onidi	23	8	13	Ret	8	12	12	Ret	22	14	12	12	18	21	6
21	(France) Jules Bianchi **J**			NC	Ret	**Ret**	30							Ret	9	4
22	(Italy) Daniel Zampieri **J**	14	14	11	Ret	17	22	24	11	10	Ret	23	21	34	15	4
23	(United Kingdom) Adrian Quaife-Hobbs **J**							Ret	9	Ret	30†	20	19	27	20	3
24	(Italy) Andrea Caldarelli **J**	28†	14	Ret	21	9	33	Ret	20	29	15	27	23	23	24	2
25	(Italy) Federico Muggia							Ret	10							2
26	(United Kingdom) Martin Plowman	29†	Ret	31	13	18	20	17	Ret	18	12	19	16	12	19	1
27	(France) Pierre Combot ^{1} **J**					13	13			9	11			19	14	0
28	(Russia) Anton Nebylitskiy ^{2} **J**	12	17	14	Ret	20	23	27	13	Ret	Ret	29	17	22	33†	0
29	(Brazil) Felipe Lapenna	Ret	25	Ret	12	14	14									0
30	(Spain) Miquel Julià Perello	19	27	17	25	24	26	21	18	26	21	21	Ret	14	16	0
31	(Switzerland) Gary Hirsch	26	22	18	17					14	Ret					0
32	(Switzerland) Jonathan Hirschi	15	18	20	15											0
31	(Portugal) Tiago Petiz	17	20	16	Ret	Ret	24	Ret	15	30	16	Ret	22			0
33	(San Marino) Nicola Zonzini **J**			15	23	28	21							28	27	0
34	(Argentina) Facundo Crovo	Ret	Ret	Ret	16			20	21	Ret	26					0
35	(Brazil) César Ramos **J**							Ret	24†	24	31†	18	18			0
36	(Monaco) Stéphane Richelmi **J**	20	21	28	20	26	18	Ret	Ret	Ret	Ret	25	Ret	24	23	0
37	(Germany) Pascal Kochem											24	29†	20	18	0
38	(Brazil) Pedro Nunes	24	Ret	24	28	29	29	23	19	27	19					0
39	(Italy) Giovanni Nava **J**	22	19	Ret	Ret											0
40	(Spain) Pablo Montilla **J**	21	29	22	27	25	28	25	23	32	25	Ret	26	31	28	0
41	(Russia) David Sigachev **J**			21	26											0
42	(Lebanon) Joe Ghanem **J**	27	30	26	24	22	Ret	Ret	22							0
43	(Andorra) Francesc Moreno **J**	25	24	29	29	Ret	27	22	Ret	33†	24	26	30	29	29	0
44	(United Kingdom) Alexander Khateeb	Ret	Ret	Ret	22											0
45	(Austria) Bianca Steiner **J**					23	32									0
46	(Poland) Natalia Kowalska **J**			25	Ret											0
47	(Bulgaria) Simeon Ivanov **J**			30	Ret	Ret	Ret							26	31	0
48	(Lebanon) Khalil Beschir							26	Ret							0
49	(South Africa) Jimmy Auby					27	31									0
	(Spain) Jaime Pintanez											DNQ	DNQ			0
The following drivers are guest ineligible to final standing.
	(France) Mathieu Arzeno									1	1			Ret	Ret	-
	(Australia) Daniel Ricciardo											17	15	33	Ret	-
	(Italy) Sergio Campana									25	18					-
	(France) Nelson Lukes									19	Ret					-
	(France) Edouard Texte									23	22					-
	(Germany) Patrick Kronenberger **J**											28†	25	25	25	-
	(Poland) Jakub Giermaziak													Ret	26	-
	(France) Nicolas Marroc									28	Ret			30	30	-
Pos	Driver	ZOL (Belgium)		NÜR (Germany)		HUN (Hungary)		DON (United Kingdom)		MAG (France)		EST (Portugal)		CAT (Spain)		Points

Colour	Result
Gold	Winner
Silver	Second place
Bronze	Third place
Green	Points classification
Blue	Non-points classification
Blue	Non-classified finish (NC)
Purple	Retired, not classified (Ret)
Red	Did not qualify (DNQ)
Red	Did not pre-qualify (DNPQ)
Black	Disqualified (DSQ)
White	Did not start (DNS)
White	Withdrew (WD)
White	Race cancelled (C)
Blank	Did not practice (DNP)
Blank	Did not arrive (DNA)
Blank	Excluded (EX)

**Bold** – Pole
Italics – Fastest Lap

† — Drivers did not finish the race, but were classified as they completed over 90% of the race distance.

- ^{1} Pierre Combot raced as guest driver with Cram Competition in rounds Magny Cours and Barcelona.
- ^{2} Anton Nebylitskiy raced as guest driver with SG Formula at Estoril and Barcelona.

=== Teams ===
Pos	Team	Points
1	(Spain) Epsilon RedBull	201
2	(France) SG Drivers Project	127
3	(France) SG Formula	112
4	(Germany) Motopark Academy	99
5	(Spain) Epsilon Euskadi	71
6	(Italy) Prema Powerteam	54
7	(Switzerland) Jenzer Motorsport	53
8	(Romania) District Racing	44
9	(Germany) Motorsport Arena	31
10	(Italy) BVM Minardi Team	23
11	(France) Graff Racing	22
12	(Belgium) Boutsen Energy Racing	22
13	(Italy) Cram Competition	6
	(United Kingdom) Carlin Motorsport	0
	(Spain) Omicron Racing	0
	(Germany) SL Formula Racing	0
	(Austria) Steiner Motorsport	0
