= Aleix Alcaraz =

Spanish racing driver

- Nationality: (Spain) Spanish
- Full name: Aleix Alcaraz Roig
- Born: 26 June 1990 (age 36) Terrassa (Spain)

Previous series
- 2008 2006–07 2006–07 2006: Formula Renault 3.5 Series; Eurocup Formula Renault 2.0; Italian Formula Renault 2.0; Spanish Formula Three

Aleix Alcaraz Roig (Note: In this Spanish name, the first or paternal surname is Alcaraz and the second or maternal family name is Roig.) (born 26 June 1990) is a Spanish former professional racing driver.

== Career ==
=== Karting ===
Before beginning his racing career, Alcaraz had a successful karting career that started in 2000, when he won the Spanish District Championship Catalonia title. A year later, he won the Copa Campeones Trophy in the Cadet class. He raced mainly in Spain until 2004, when he began competing in various European karting championships, including the European Championship ICA Junior, Andrea Margutti Trophy ICA Junior, and Italian Open Masters ICA Junior categories.

2005 saw Alcaraz claim the Spanish Championship ICA Junior title, beating countryman Roberto Merhi by four points, and finish third in the Andrea Margutti Trophy ICA Junior class, behind Merhi and Charles Pic. His final year of karting in 2006 saw Alcaraz claim fifth place in the World Cup ICA class.

=== Formula Three ===
In October 2006, Alcaraz stepped up to single-seaters, racing in the penultimate round of the Spanish Formula Three Championship season in Jerez, where he finished the two races in 16th and 15th places respectively.

=== Formula Renault 2.0 ===
Later the same month, Alcaraz made his Formula Renault début at the final round of the Eurocup Formula Renault 2.0 season in Barcelona, finishing the two events in 24th and 23rd place respectively. In November 2006, he took part in the Italian Formula Renault 2.0 Winter Series for Cram Competition, finishing in seventh place with teammate and former Formula One driver Jaime Alguersuari winning all four races and the title.

In 2007, Alcaraz contested both the Eurocup Formula Renault 2.0 and Italian Formula Renault 2.0 series with the Petrom District Racing AP team, alongside Mihai Marinescu. In the Eurocup, he finished in 19th place after two points finishes, whilst in the Italian championship he finished in the points on eight occasions to be classified in 17th place, despite missing the final round of the series at Monza.

=== Formula Renault 3.5 Series ===
In November 2007, Alcaraz sampled a Formula Renault 3.5 Series car for the first time, driving for Pons Racing at the opening winter test at Paul Ricard. Although he conducted the majority of his winter testing with the team, he was signed by Italian team RC Motorsport to contest the 2008 season. Despite an encouraging start to the season, when he finished in the points in only his second race, Alcaraz left the team after the fourth round of the year at Silverstone and was subsequently replaced by Brazilian Claudio Cantelli.

Alcaraz did, however, return to the series at the following round of the season in Hungary, taking the seat of Máximo Cortés at Pons Racing, who had run into sponsorship problems. In his ten races for the team, he took a single points finish in the sprint race at Le Mans to eventually be classified 27th in the final standings.

== Racing record ==
=== Career summary ===
Season	Series	Team	Races	Wins	Poles	F/Laps	Podiums	Points	Position
2006	Spanish Formula Three Championship	RSC	2	0	0	0	0	0	NC†
2006	Eurocup Formula Renault 2.0	RSC	2	0	0	0	0	0	NC†
2006	Italian Formula Renault 2.0 – Winter Series	Cram Competition	4	0	0	0	0	60	7th
2007	Eurocup Formula Renault 2.0	Petrom District Racing AP	14	0	0	0	0	7	19th
2007	Italian Formula Renault 2.0	Petrom District Racing AP	12	0	0	0	0	61	17th
2008	Formula Renault 3.5 Series	RC Motorsport	17	0	0	0	0	5	27th
2008	Formula Renault 3.5 Series	Pons Racing	17	0	0	0	0	5	27th

† - As Alcaraz was a guest driver, he was ineligible to score points.

=== Complete Eurocup Formula Renault 2.0 results ===
(key) (Races in bold indicate pole position; races in italics indicate fastest lap)

Year	Entrant	1	2	3	4	5	6	7	8	9	10	11	12	13	14	DC	Points
2006	RSC	ZOL; 1	ZOL; 2	IST; 1	IST; 2	MIS; 1	MIS; 2	NÜR; 1	NÜR; 2	DON; 1	DON; 2	LMS; 1	LMS; 2	CAT; 1; 24	CAT; 2; 23	NC†	0
2007	Petrom District Racing AP	ZOL; 1; 11	ZOL; 2 Ret	NÜR; 1 Ret	NÜR; 2 Ret	HUN; 1; 12	HUN; 2; 7	DON; 1; 19	DON; 2; 17	MAG; 1; 12	MAG; 2; 23	EST; 1; 15	EST; 2; 9	CAT; 1; 16	CAT; 2; 13	19th	7

† As Alcaraz was a guest driver, he was ineligible for points

=== Complete Formula Renault 3.5 Series results ===
(key) (Races in bold indicate pole position) (Races in italics indicate fastest lap)

Year	Team	1	2	3	4	5	6	7	8	9	10	11	12	13	14	15	16	17	Pos	Points
2008	RC Motorsport	MNZ; 1; 11	MNZ; 2; 9	SPA; 1 Ret	SPA; 2; 18	MON; 1 Ret	SIL; 1; 20	SIL; 2; 22											27th	5
2008	Pons Racing								HUN; 1 Ret	HUN; 2; 18	NÜR; 1 Ret	NÜR; 2 Ret	LMS; 1; 8	LMS; 2; 13	EST; 1; 15	EST; 2; 13	CAT; 1; 11	CAT; 2; 11	27th	5
