= Mathieu Arzeno =

French rally driver

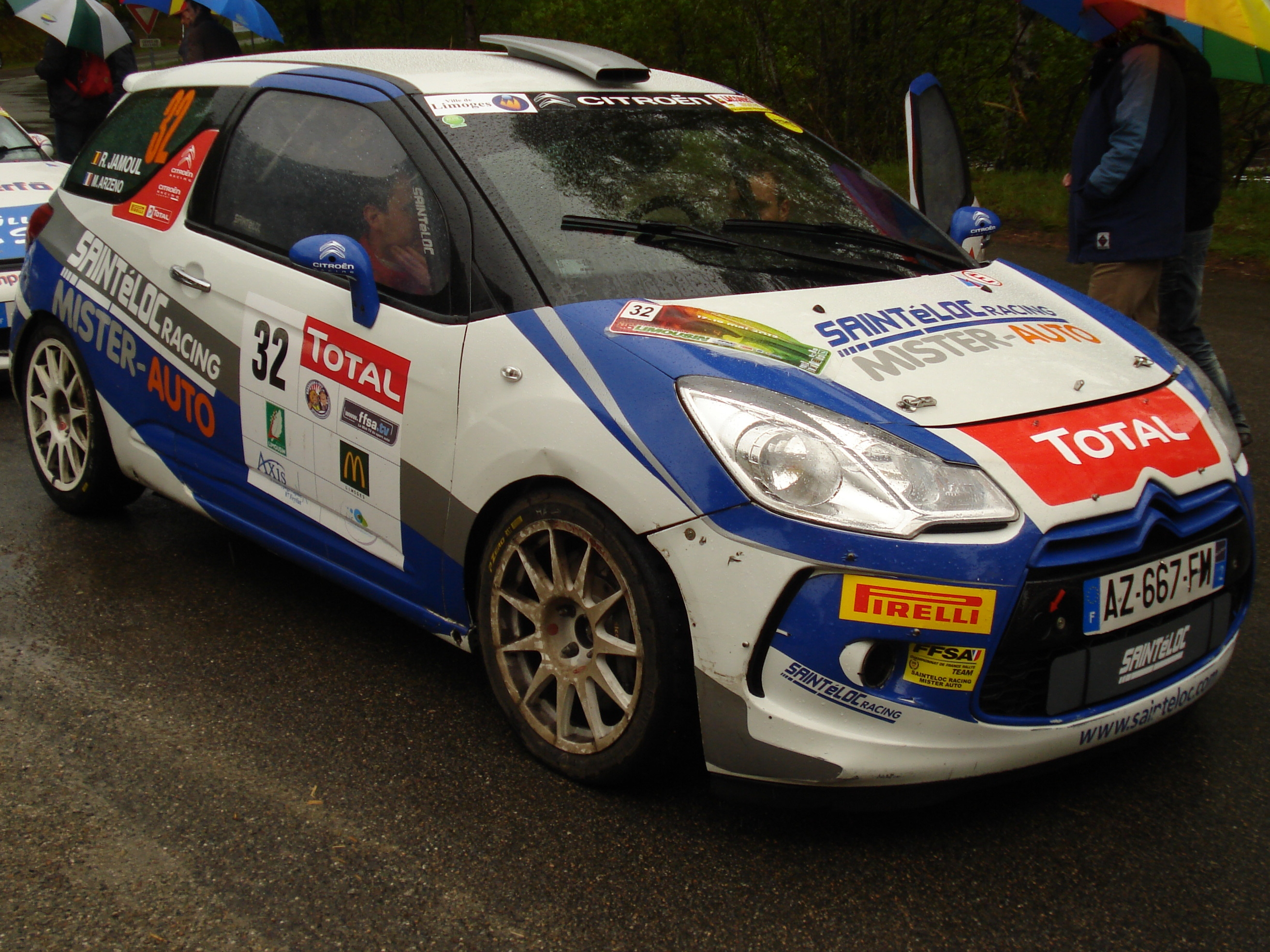
- Mathieu Arzeno

Personal information
- Nationality: French
- Born: 18 August 1987 (age 39)

World Rally Championship record
- Years active: 2010 – present
- Teams: Saintéloc Racing
- Rallies: 10
- Championships: 0
- Rally wins: 0
- Podiums: 0
- Stage wins: 0
- Total points: 1
- First rally: 2010 Rally de Portugal
- Last rally: 2018 Monte Carlo Rally

Mathieu Arzeno
Medal record
Rallying
Representing France
FIA Motorsport Games
Gold medal – first place	2022 France	Rally2

Mathieu Arzeno (born 18 August 1987 in Salon-de-Provence) is a French rally driver and former racing driver. He scored his first World Rally Championship point on 2012 Rallye Deutschland finishing tenth overall in a Peugeot 207 S2000.

== Career ==
=== Circuit racing ===
Arzeno started off in karting, before stepping up to single-seaters 2005 when he finished second in Formula Renault Campus behind champion Jean-Karl Vernay. The following year he raced in French Formula Renault, finishing seventh overall before improving to the runner-up spot in 2007 behind Jules Bianchi. In 2008 he came tenth in the Eurocup Formula Renault 2.0, but skipped two of the seven meetings due to a lack of budget.

=== Rallying ===
In 2009, Arzeno switched to rallying and promptly finished 12th overall and third in class on the iconic Monte Carlo Rally. In 2010, he contested the Junior World Rally Championship before focussing on the French tarmac championship in 2011.

== Racing record ==
=== Complete Eurocup Formula Renault 2.0 results ===
(key) (Races in bold indicate pole position; races in italics indicate fastest lap)

Year	Entrant	1	2	3	4	5	6	7	8	9	10	11	12	13	14	DC	Points
2006	Graff Racing	ZOL; 1; 18	ZOL; 2; 13	IST; 1	IST; 2	MIS; 1	MIS; 2	NÜR; 1	NÜR; 2	DON; 1	DON; 2	LMS; 1	LMS; 2	CAT; 1	CAT; 2	33rd	0

=== Complete Eurocup Formula Renault 2.0 results ===
(key) (Races in bold indicate pole position; races in italics indicate fastest lap)

Year	Entrant	1	2	3	4	5	6	7	8	9	10	11	12	13	14	DC	Points
2007	Epsilon Sport Team	ZOL; 1	ZOL; 2	NÜR; 1	NÜR; 2	HUN; 1	HUN; 2	DON; 1	DON; 2	MAG; 1; 1	MAG; 2; 1	EST; 1	EST; 2	CAT; 1 Ret	CAT; 2 Ret	NC†	0
2008	Epsilon Sport	SPA; 1; 9	SPA; 2 Ret	SIL; 1; 5	SIL; 2; 7	HUN; 1	HUN; 2	NÜR; 1	NÜR; 2	LMS; 1 Ret	LMS; 2 Ret	EST; 1 NC	EST; 2 Ret	CAT; 1; 5	CAT; 2; 6	10th	23

† As Arzeno was a guest driver, he was ineligible for points

=== WRC results ===
Year	Entrant	Car	1	2	3	4	5	6	7	8	9	10	11	12	13	WDC	Points
2010	Mathieu Arzeno	Citroën C2 R2 Max	SWE	MEX	JOR	TUR	NZL	POR; Ret								NC	0
2010	Mathieu Arzeno	Citroën C2 S1600							BUL; 23	FIN	GER; Ret	JPN	FRA; 30			NC	0
2010	Mathieu Arzeno	Ford Fiesta R2												ESP; Ret	GBR	NC	0
2012	Saintéloc Racing	Peugeot 207 S2000	MON; Ret										FRA; Ret	ITA	ESP	29th	1
2012	Mathieu Arzeno	Peugeot 207 S2000		SWE	MEX	POR	ARG	GRE	NZL	FIN	GER; 10					29th	1
2012	Mathieu Arzeno	Citroën DS3 R3T										GBR; 18				29th	1

=== JWRC results ===
Year	Entrant	Car	1	2	3	4	5	6	JWRC	Points
2010	Mathieu Arzeno	Citroën C2 R2 Max	TUR	POR; Ret					11th	16
2010	Mathieu Arzeno	Citroën C2 S1600			BUL; 8	GER; Ret	FRA; 4		11th	16
2010	Mathieu Arzeno	Ford Fiesta R2						ESP; Ret	11th	16
