= 2006 Eurocup Formula Renault 2.0 =

Motor racing competition

Seasons
- ← 2005 2007 →

The 2006 Eurocup Formula Renault 2.0 season was the sixteenth Eurocup Formula Renault 2.0 season. The season began at Zolder on 29 April and finished at the Barcelona on 29 October, after fourteen rounds.

Motopark Academy's Filipe Albuquerque who took a pair of double wins at Nürburgring and Barcelona clinched the championship title in the final round at Barcelona by eight points ahead of JD Motorsport's Chris van der Drift, who won two races during the season at Misano and Donington Park. Van der Drift also finished as top rookie. Carlo van Dam finished in third for SG Formula, after win at Le Mans and another four podiums. Another driver who won on Bugatti Circuit was Bertrand Baguette who finished two points behind van Dam for Epsilon Euskadi. Kasper Andersen completed the top five without scoring a win. Laurent Groppi won two races of the opening round at Zolder, but contested just six races, as well as Donington winner Sébastien Buemi. Dani Clos won at Istanbul Park and Misano, but due to disqualification in the second race at Misano he managed only seventh place in the series' standings.

== Teams and drivers ==
2006 Entry List
Team	No.	Driver name	Rounds
(Italy) Prema Powerteam	0	(Italy) Edoardo Mortara	All
(Italy) Prema Powerteam	2	(Netherlands) Henkie Waldschmidt	All
(Italy) Prema Powerteam	3	(United Kingdom) Martin Plowman	All
(United Kingdom) Comtec Team	1	(United Kingdom) Pippa Mann	All
(France) SG Formula	4	(France) Tom Dillmann	All
(France) SG Formula	5	(Estonia) Sten Pentus	1–4
(France) SG Formula	5	(France) Yann Clairay	6
(France) SG Formula	6	(Netherlands) Carlo van Dam	All
(France) SG Formula	12	(France) Alexandre Marsoin	7
(France) SG Formula	64	(France) Jean Karl Vernay	4
(France) SG Formula	65	(France) Julien Jousse	4
(Spain) Epsilon Euskadi	7	(Bahrain) Salman bin Rashid Al-Khalifa	All
(Spain) Epsilon Euskadi	8	(Belgium) Bertrand Baguette	All
(Spain) Epsilon Euskadi	9	(France) Jacky Ferre	1
(Spain) Epsilon Euskadi	9	(France) Nelson Panciatici	6–7
(Germany) Motopark Academy	10	(Portugal) Filipe Albuquerque	All
(Germany) Motopark Academy	11	(Australia) Nathan Antunes	1
(Germany) Motopark Academy	11	(Switzerland) Sébastien Buemi	2–3, 5
(Germany) Motopark Academy	11	(Canada) Robert Wickens	4
(Germany) Motopark Academy	11	(Italy) Stefano Coletti	6–7
(Germany) Motorsport Arena	12	(United States) John Michael Edwards	All
(Germany) Motorsport Arena	14	(New Zealand) Brendon Hartley	All
(Italy) Cram Competition	15	(Spain) Jaime Alguersuari	All
(Italy) Cram Competition	16	(Italy) Edoardo Piscopo	All
(Italy) Cram Competition	17	(South Africa) Adrian Zaugg	1–3
(Italy) Cram Competition	17	(Italy) Stefano Coletti	4
(Italy) Cram Competition	17	(United Kingdom) Oliver Oakes	5–7
(Switzerland) Team Jenzer	18	(Austria) Walter Grubmüller	1–4
(Switzerland) Team Jenzer	18	(Brazil) Claudio Cantelli	5–6
(Switzerland) Team Jenzer	18	(Argentina) Mariano Werner	7
(Switzerland) Team Jenzer	19	(Spain) Marco Frezza	1–4
(Switzerland) Team Jenzer	19	(Spain) Oliver Campos-Hull	5–7
(Switzerland) Jenzer Motorsport	20	(Netherlands) Junior Strous	1–2
(Switzerland) Jenzer Motorsport	20	(Finland) Atte Mustonen	5–7
(Switzerland) Jenzer Motorsport	21	(Switzerland) Rahel Frey	All
(Switzerland) Jenzer Motorsport	22	(Spain) Dani Clos	All
(Switzerland) Jenzer Motorsport	52	(Turkey) Cem Kent	2
(Italy) JD Motorsport	24	(Denmark) Kasper Andersen	All
(Italy) JD Motorsport	25	(New Zealand) Chris van der Drift	All
(Italy) JD Motorsport	26	(Netherlands) Xavier Maassen	All
(Finland) Koiranen Bros Motorsport	27	(Finland) Atte Mustonen	1–4
(Finland) Koiranen Bros Motorsport	27	(Argentina) Facundo Crovo	7
(Finland) Koiranen Bros Motorsport	28	(Finland) Tomi Limmonen	1, 3–4
(Finland) Koiranen Bros Motorsport	28	(Portugal) Duarte Félix da Costa	7
(Germany) SL Formula Racing	29	(Belgium) Frédéric Vervisch	1–2
(Germany) SL Formula Racing	29	(Germany) Bruno Rudolf Fechner	5
(Germany) SL Formula Racing	30	(France) Johan Charpilienne	1
(Germany) SL Formula Racing	30	(Russia) Anton Nebylitskiy	2, 5–6
(France) Graff Racing	31	(France) Laurent Groppi	1, 4, 6
(France) Graff Racing	32	(France) Mathieu Arzeno	1
(France) Graff Racing	32	(Brazil) Claudio Cantelli	4
(France) Graff Racing	32	(France) Julien Canal	6
(Netherlands) AR Motorsport	34	(Portugal) Duarte Félix da Costa	1–2, 4–5
(Netherlands) AR Motorsport	35	(Netherlands) Mervyn Kool	1, 4
(Italy) BVM Motorsport	36	(Mexico) Pablo Sánchez López	All
(Italy) BVM Motorsport	37	(Italy) Frederico Muggia	All
(Italy) BVM Motorsport	41	(Italy) Daniel Zampieri	3–4, 7
(Finland) MRD Motorsport	38	(Finland) Joonas Mannerjarvi	1–6
(Finland) MRD Motorsport	58	(China) Qing Hua Ma	3
(Spain) Twincam Motorsport	44	(Spain) Oliver Campos-Hull	1–4
(Spain) Twincam Motorsport	44	(Austria) Walter Grubmüller	5–7
(Spain) Twincam Motorsport	45	(Spain) Daniel Campos-Hull	2
(Italy) Euronova Racing	53	(Italy) Alberto Costa	3
(Italy) Euronova Racing	59	(Italy) Filippo Ponti	3
(Italy) IT Loox	54	(Italy) Valentino Sebastiani	3
(Italy) IT Loox	55	(Italy) Niki Sebastiani	3
(Italy) IT Loox	56	(Italy) Riccardo Cinti	3
(Italy) RP Motorsport	57	(Italy) Matteo Chinosi	3
(Italy) CO2 Motorsport	60	(Italy) Andrea Caldarelli	3
(France) Hexis Racing	61	(France) Sébastien Chardonnet	4
(France) Hexis Racing	62	(France) Malo Olivier	4
(France) Hexis Racing	63	(France) Ulric Amado de Carvalho	4
(Italy) BVM Minardi Team	66	(Italy) Frankie Provenzano	6
(France) Pole Services	67	(France) Johan Charpilienne	6
(France) Pole Services	68	(France) Pierre Combot	6
(Spain) RSC	70	(Spain) Aleix Alcaraz	7
(Spain) RSC	71	(Spain) José Luis López-Pamplo	7

== Calendar ==
Round		Circuit	Date	Pole position	Fastest lap	Winning driver	Winning team
1	R1	(Belgium) Circuit Zolder	29 April	(France) Laurent Groppi	(France) Laurent Groppi	(France) Laurent Groppi	(France) Graff Racing
1	R2	(Belgium) Circuit Zolder	30 April		(France) Laurent Groppi	(France) Laurent Groppi	(France) Graff Racing
2	R1	(Turkey) Istanbul Park	17 June	(Spain) Dani Clos	(Italy) Edoardo Piscopo	(Spain) Dani Clos	(Switzerland) Jenzer Motorsport
2	R2	(Turkey) Istanbul Park	18 June		(Spain) Dani Clos	(Spain) Dani Clos	(Switzerland) Jenzer Motorsport
3	R1	(Italy) Misano World Circuit	15 July	(Spain) Dani Clos	(South Africa) Adrian Zaugg	(Spain) Dani Clos	(Switzerland) Jenzer Motorsport
3	R2	(Italy) Misano World Circuit	16 July		(Australia) Chris van der Drift	(Australia) Chris van der Drift	(Italy) JD Motorsport
4	R1	(Germany) Nürburgring	5 August	(Portugal) Filipe Albuquerque	(Portugal) Filipe Albuquerque	(Portugal) Filipe Albuquerque	(Germany) Motopark Academy
4	R2	(Germany) Nürburgring	6 August		(France) Tom Dillmann	(Portugal) Filipe Albuquerque	(Germany) Motopark Academy
5	R1	(United Kingdom) Donington Park	9 September	(Australia) Chris van der Drift	(Denmark) Kasper Andersen	(Switzerland) Sébastien Buemi	(Germany) Motopark Academy
5	R2	(United Kingdom) Donington Park	10 September		(Finland) Atte Mustonen	(Australia) Chris van der Drift	(Italy) JD Motorsport
6	R1	(France) Bugatti Circuit, Le Mans	30 September	(Netherlands) Carlo van Dam	(Belgium) Bertrand Baguette	(Belgium) Bertrand Baguette	(Spain) Epsilon Euskadi
6	R2	(France) Bugatti Circuit, Le Mans	1 October		(France) Laurent Groppi	(Netherlands) Carlo van Dam	(France) SG Formula
7	R1	(Spain) Circuit de Catalunya, Barcelona	28 October	(Portugal) Filipe Albuquerque	(Netherlands) Carlo van Dam	(Portugal) Filipe Albuquerque	(Germany) Motopark Academy
7	R2	(Spain) Circuit de Catalunya, Barcelona	29 October		(France) Tom Dillmann	(Portugal) Filipe Albuquerque	(Germany) Motopark Academy

== Championship standings ==
=== Drivers ===
Points are awarded to the drivers as follows:

Position	1	2	3	4	5	6	7	8	9	10	PP*
Points	15	12	10	8	6	5	4	3	2	1	1

* – only awarded to race one polesitters

Pos	Driver	ZOL (Belgium)		IST (Turkey)		MIS (Italy)		NÜR (Germany)		DON (United Kingdom)		LMS (France)		CAT (Spain)		Points
Pos	Driver	1	2	3	4	5	6	7	8	9	10	11	12	13	14	Points
1	(Portugal) Filipe Albuquerque	9	6	28†	5	6	4	**1**	1	15	4	11	Ret	**1**	1	99
2	(New Zealand) Chris van der Drift	2	20	8	4	4	1	3	3	**11**	1	Ret	11	22	6	91
3	(Netherlands) Carlo van Dam	5	24	2	3	8	6	6	8	Ret	2	**3**	1	10	7	90
4	(Belgium) Bertrand Baguette	3	2	13	11	9	8	23	30	2	3	1	6	4	5	88
5	(Denmark) Kasper Andersen	6	Ret	Ret	7	3	Ret	5	5	3	7	2	Ret	3	3	78
6	(France) Laurent Groppi	**1**	1					2	2			7	4			75
7	(Spain) Dani Clos	11	10	**1**	1	**1**	DSQ	4	4	10	10	10	Ret	Ret	19	70
8	(France) Tom Dillmann	24	4	9	27	2	7	11	34	4	Ret	Ret	NC	2	2	61
9	(Finland) Atte Mustonen	4	5	3	2	Ret	Ret	16	16	9	20	9	5	17	11	54
10	(Italy) Edoardo Piscopo	Ret	18	5	6	5	11	10	11	7	16	Ret	Ret	13	4	34
11	(Switzerland) Sébastien Buemi			4	8	Ret	9			1	6					33
12	(Spain) Jaime Alguersuari	31	21	16	9	7	2	20	31	Ret	Ret	Ret	Ret	5	16	24
13	(Netherlands) Xavier Maassen	26*	3	10	19	Ret	Ret	12	9	Ret	5	13	16	16	12	21
14	(New Zealand) Brendon Hartley	19	Ret	6	28	29	5	7	6	Ret	12	12	Ret	Ret	17	21
15	(Netherlands) Henkie Waldschmidt	16	23	21	23	14	29	14	12	Ret	18	5	9	7	10	19
16	(South Africa) Adrian Zaugg	12	8	Ret	16	Ret*	3									14
17	(United States) John Michael Edwards	Ret	16	7	Ret	Ret	18	9	10	6	13	Ret	DNS	21	Ret	14
18	(Italy) Frederico Muggia	8	7	Ret	15	Ret	19	32	Ret	Ret	Ret	14	Ret	Ret	9	10
19	(Austria) Walter Grubmüller	17	27	12	18	22	16	Ret	DNS	5	8	17	18	Ret	15	9
20	(France) Johan Charpilienne	7	NC									8	Ret			9
21	(Switzerland) Rahel Frey	13	14	27†	12	Ret	17	Ret	26	8	14	18	Ret	6	DSQ	8
22	(Italy) Edoardo Mortara	15	Ret	Ret	20	26	12	17	20	Ret	9	Ret	7	Ret	27	8
23	(United Kingdom) Martin Plowman	22	17	22	Ret	NC	23	21	35	16	11	21	10	9	24	7
24	(Netherlands) Mervyn Kool	28	9					13	15							2
25	(Spain) Oliver Campos-Hull	32†	Ret	23	Ret	11	14	15	13	DNS	DNS	16	13	14	14	2
26	(Netherlands) Junior Strous	10	12	14	13											1
27	(Italy) Marco Frezza	Ret	Ret	17	14	10	Ret	22	22							1
28	(Italy) Daniel Zampieri					19	25	Ret	Ret					11	Ret	1
29	(Brazil) Claudio Cantelli							30	28	14	17	23	15			1
30	(Estonia) Sten Pentus	27	11	25	22	20	28	24	23							0
31	(Mexico) Pablo Sánchez López	25	15	24	21	13	Ret	25	21	12	19	19	Ret	12	20	0
32	(Portugal) Duarte Félix da Costa	Ret	19	20	17			Ret	19	13	Ret			15	18	0
33	(France) Mathieu Arzeno	18	13													0
34	(Australia) Nathan Antunes	14	Ret													0
35	(United Kingdom) Pippa Mann	29	Ret	15	Ret	16	21	31	25	Ret	15	20	20	Ret	21	0
36	(Canada) Robert Wickens							18	17							0
37	(Finland) Joonas Mannerjarvi	20	22	19	24	18	20	33	27	18	Ret	25	19			0
38	(Russia) Anton Nebylitskiy			18	29					19	Ret	22	Ret			0
39	(Italy) Stefano Coletti							26	18			Ret	Ret	Ret	Ret	0
40	(Bahrain) Salman bin Rashid Al-Khalifa	Ret	26	Ret	25	28	27	Ret	32	20	Ret	Ret	Ret	20	25	0
41	(France) Jacky Ferre	21	25													0
42	(Belgium) Frédéric Vervisch	23	Ret	DSQ	Ret											0
43	(Finland) Tomi Limmonen	30	Ret			Ret	Ret	27	24							0
44	(Turkey) Cem Kent			26	26											0
The following drivers are guest ineligible to final standing
	(France) Yann Clairay											26	2			-
	(France) Nelson Panciatici											4	3	18	13	-
	(France) Pierre Combot											6	14			-
	(France) Jean Karl Vernay							8	7							-
	(United Kingdom) Oliver Oakes									Ret	Ret	Ret	8	19	8	-
	(France) Alexandre Marsoin													8	Ret	-
	(Spain) Daniel Campos-Hull			11	10											-
	(Italy) Niki Sebastiani					27	10									-
	(Italy) Filippo Ponti					12	15									-
	(France) Julien Canal											15	12			-
	(Italy) Valentino Sebastiani					25	13									-
	(France) Julien Jousse							19	14							-
	(Italy) Matteo Chinosi					15	26									-
	(Italy) Frankie Provenzano							24	17							-
	(Italy) Riccardo Cinti					17	Ret									-
	(Germany) Bruno Rudolf Fechner									17	Ret					-
	(China) Qing Hua Ma					21	22									-
	(Argentina) Facundo Crovo													NC	22	-
	(Spain) Aleix Alcaraz													24	23	-
	(Argentina) Mariano Werner													23	28†	-
	(Italy) Andrea Caldarelli					23	Ret									-
	(Italy) Alberto Costa					24	24									-
	(Spain) José Luis López-Pamplo													Ret	26	-
	(France) Ulric Amado de Carvalho							28	Ret							-
	(France) Sébastien Chardonnet							29	33							-
	(France) Malo Olivier							NC	29			Ret	DNS			-
Pos	Driver	ZOL (Belgium)		IST (Turkey)		MIS (Italy)		NÜR (Germany)		DON (United Kingdom)		LMS (France)		CAT (Spain)		Points

Colour	Result
Gold	Winner
Silver	Second place
Bronze	Third place
Green	Points classification
Blue	Non-points classification
Blue	Non-classified finish (NC)
Purple	Retired, not classified (Ret)
Red	Did not qualify (DNQ)
Red	Did not pre-qualify (DNPQ)
Black	Disqualified (DSQ)
White	Did not start (DNS)
White	Withdrew (WD)
White	Race cancelled (C)
Blank	Did not practice (DNP)
Blank	Did not arrive (DNA)
Blank	Excluded (EX)

**Bold** – Pole
Italics – Fastest Lap

† — Drivers did not finish the race, but were classified as they completed over 90% of the race distance.

=== Teams ===
Pos	Team	Points
1	(Italy) JD Motorsport	170
2	(France) SG Formula	151
3	(Germany) Motopark Academy	132
4	(Switzerland) Jenzer Motorsport	89
5	(Spain) Epsilon Euskadi	88
6	(France) Graff Racing	75
7	(Italy) Cram Competition	54
8	(Finland) Koiranen Bros	36
9	(Germany) Motorsport Arena	35
10	(Italy) Prema Powerteam	25
11	(Italy) BVM Minardi Team	10
12	(Germany) SL Formula Racing	9
13	(Spain) Twincam Motorsport	9
14	(Switzerland) Team Jenzer	4
15	(Netherlands) AR Motorsport	2
