= Claudio Cantelli =

Brazilian racing driver

Claudio Cantelli, Jr.
- Nationality: (Brazil) Brazilian
- Born: May 20, 1989 (age 37) Guarapuava (Brazil)

Previous series
- 2009 2008 2007 2006 2006 2006: South American Formula Three; Formula Renault 3.5 Series; International Formula Master; British Formula Renault 2.0; Eurocup Formula Renault 2.0; Brazilian Formula Renault 2.0

Claudio Cantelli, Jr. (born May 20, 1989 in Guarapuava) is a Brazilian professional racing driver.

== Career ==
=== Formula Renault 2.0 ===
After an early career in karting, in which he became a national champion, Cantelli made his single-seater debut in 2006 in the Brazilian Formula Renault 2.0 series. Driving for Dragão Motorsport and Cesário F.Renault, he took two podium places and three fastest laps to finish ninth in the standings.

During the same year, Cantelli also contested six races of the Eurocup Formula Renault 2.0 championship with Graff Racing, scoring a single point to be classified in 29th position. At the end of the season, Cantelli took part in the four-race British Formula Renault 2.0 Winter Series, held at Brands Hatch and Croft. Racing for the Position 1 team, he finished the championship in eleventh place.

=== International Formula Master ===
In 2007, Cantelli took part in the inaugural International Formula Master championship, which acted as a support series to the World Touring Car Championship. He scored a single point in the second race at Pau to end the season in 28th place.

=== Formula Renault 3.5 Series ===
In March 2008, Cantelli joined the new Ultimate Signature team to contest the Formula Renault 3.5 Series. He took part in the first five races of the season with the team, but was replaced by Esteban Guerrieri after the Monaco round. After missing the following event at Silverstone, Cantelli returned to the series at the Hungaroring, replacing Aleix Alcaraz at Italian team RC Motorsport. He finished in the points on one occasion, at the Nürburgring, to claim 28th place in the final standings.

=== Formula Three ===
After taking part in FR3.5 winter testing, Cantelli returned to South America in 2009 to compete in the South American Formula 3 Championship. Driving for Bassan Motorsport, he took three race victories and a further three podium places to finish as runner-up behind series champion Leonardo Cordeiro.

== Racing record ==
=== Career summary ===
Season	Series	Team	Races	Wins	Poles	F/Laps	Podiums	Points	Position
2006	Brazilian Formula Renault 2.0	Dragão Motorsport	9	0	0	3	2	185	9th
2006	Brazilian Formula Renault 2.0	Cesário F.Renault	9	0	0	3	2	185	9th
2006	Eurocup Formula Renault 2.0	Graff Racing	6	0	0	0	0	1	29th
2006	British Formula Renault 2.0 – Winter Series	Position 1 Racing	4	0	0	?	0	38	11th
2007	International Formula Master	JD Motorsport	16	0	0	0	0	1	28th
2008	Formula Renault 3.5 Series	Ultimate Signature	15	0	0	0	0	3	28th
2008	Formula Renault 3.5 Series	RC Motorsport	15	0	0	0	0	3	28th
2009	South American Formula 3 Championship	Bassan Motorsport	17	3	3	1	6	97	**2nd**

=== Complete Eurocup Formula Renault 2.0 results ===
(key) (Races in bold indicate pole position; races in italics indicate fastest lap)

Year	Entrant	1	2	3	4	5	6	7	8	9	10	11	12	13	14	DC	Points
2006	Graff Racing	ZOL; 1	ZOL; 2	IST; 1	IST; 2	MIS; 1	MIS; 2	NÜR; 1; 30	NÜR; 2; 28	DON; 1; 14	DON; 2; 17	LMS; 1; 23	LMS; 2; 15	CAT; 1	CAT; 2	29th	1

=== Complete Formula Renault 3.5 Series results ===
(key) (Races in bold indicate pole position) (Races in italics indicate fastest lap)

Year	Team	1	2	3	4	5	6	7	8	9	10	11	12	13	14	15	16	17	Pos	Points
2008	Ultimate Signature	MNZ; 1; 16	MNZ; 2 Ret	SPA; 1; 12	SPA; 2; 19	MON; 1; 17	SIL; 1	SIL; 2											28th	3
2008	RC Motorsport								HUN; 1; 14	HUN; 2; 17	NÜR; 1; 8	NÜR; 2; 17	LMS; 1; 16	LMS; 2; 20	EST; 1; 18	EST; 2; 17	CAT; 1 Ret	CAT; 2; 16	28th	3
