= Henkie Waldschmidt =

Dutch racing driver

- Born: 28 June 1988 (age 38) The Hague, Netherlands

Formula Three Euroseries career
- Current team: SG Formula
- Car number: 11

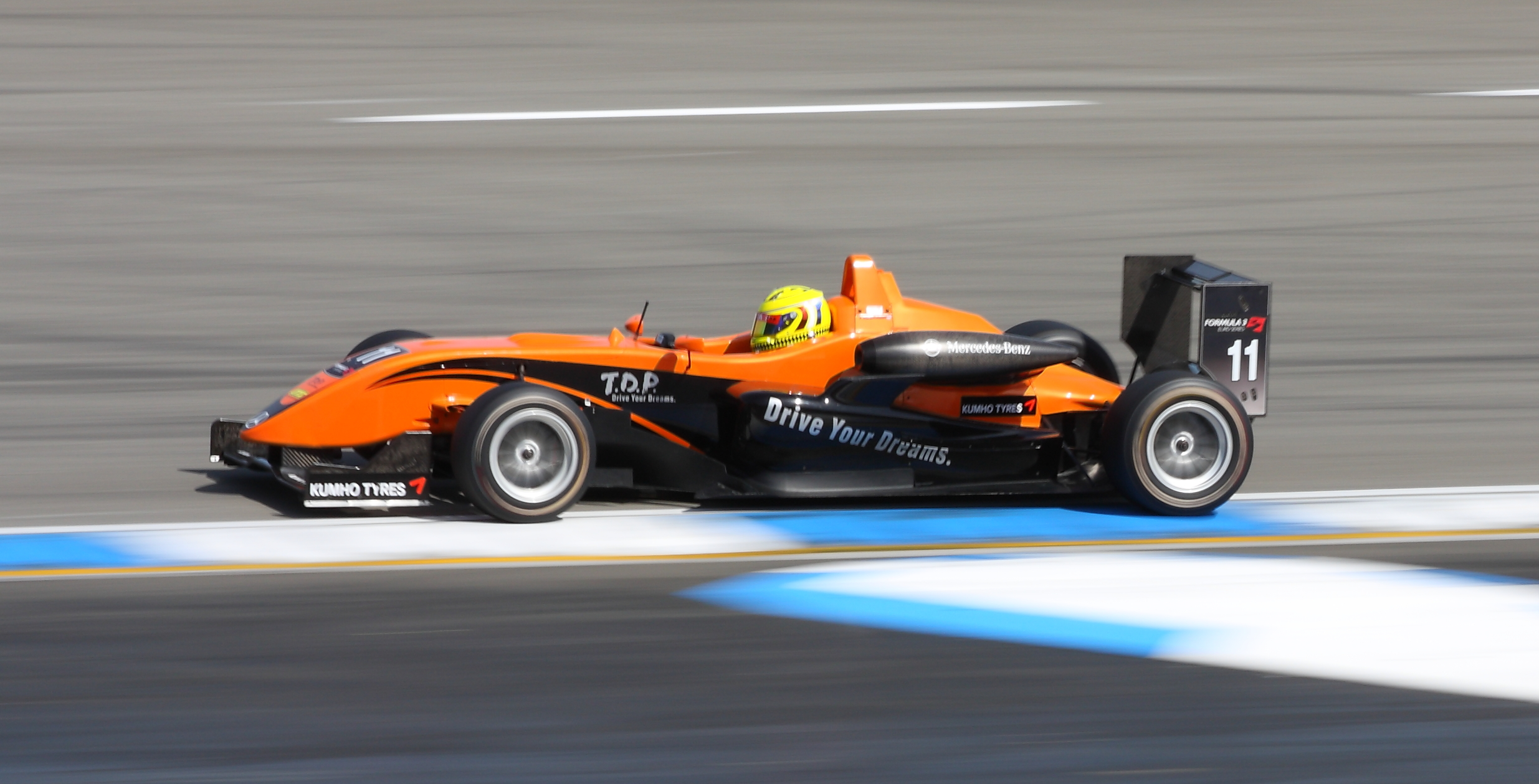
Waldschmidt on the Formula Three Euroseries at the Hockenheimring (2009)

Henkie Waldschmidt (also spelled Henki, born 28 June 1988 in The Hague) is a Dutch racing driver. He has competed in such series as Eurocup Formula Renault 2.0 and the Formula Three Euroseries.

Waldscmidt started his racing career in 1995. In 2006, he joined the Young Drivers Program for the Toyota Formula One team. In December 2008, he had his first experience in testing a Toyota Formula One car.

== Complete Eurocup Formula Renault 2.0 results ==
(key) (Races in bold indicate pole position; races in italics indicate fastest lap)

Year	Entrant	1	2	3	4	5	6	7	8	9	10	11	12	13	14	DC	Points
2006	Prema Powerteam	ZOL; 1; 16	ZOL; 2; 23	IST; 1; 21	IST; 2; 23	MIS; 1; 14	MIS; 2; 29	NÜR; 1; 14	NÜR; 2; 12	DON; 1 Ret	DON; 2; 18	LMS; 1; 5	LMS; 2; 9	CAT; 1; 7	CAT; 2; 10	15th	19
2007	Prema Powerteam	ZOL; 1 DSQ	ZOL; 2; 2	NÜR; 1; 1	NÜR; 2 DSQ	HUN; 1; 7	HUN; 2; 10	DON; 1; 14	DON; 2 Ret	MAG; 1; 17	MAG; 2; 8	EST; 1; 4	EST; 2; 4	CAT; 1; 15	CAT; 2; 12	7th	52
