= Mario Romancini =

Brazilian racing driver

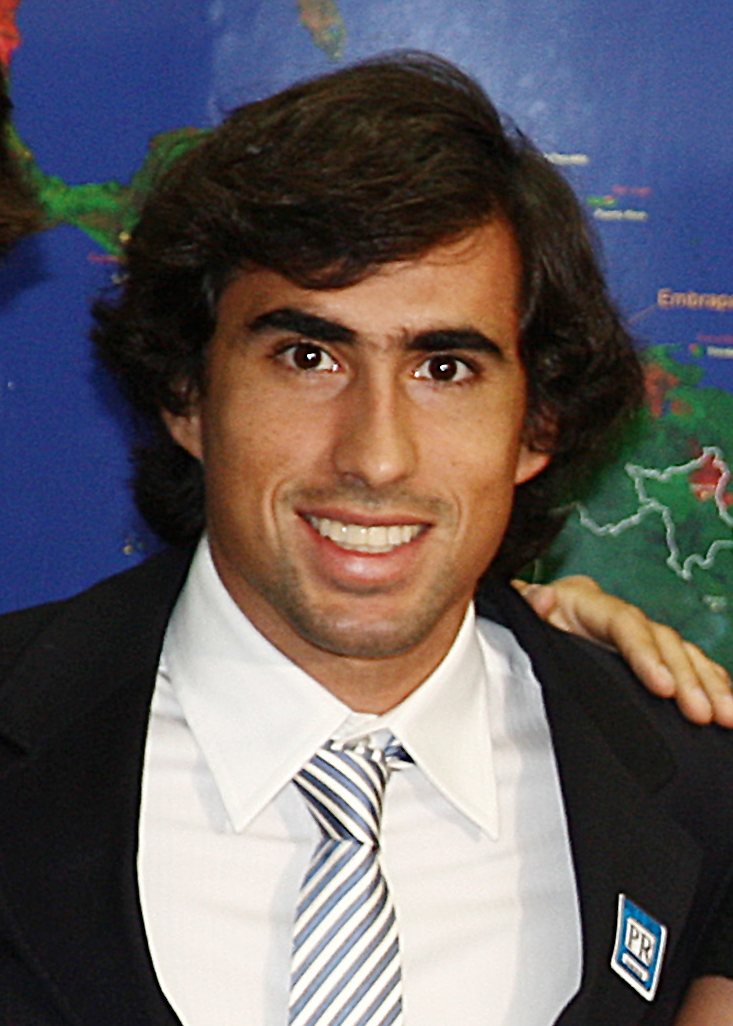
- Romancini in 2010
- Nationality: (Brazil) Brazilian
- Born: Mario Klabin Xavier Romancini; December 15, 1987 (age 38) Telêmaco Borba, Brazil

IZOD INDYCAR Series career
- Debut season: 2010
- Current team: Conquest Racing
- Car number: None
- Starts: 6
- Wins: 0
- Poles: 0
- Fastest laps: 0

Previous series
- 2009 2008 2007 2006: Firestone Indy Lights Series; World Series by Renault; South American Formula 3 Brazilian Formula Renault 2.0

Mario Klabin Xavier Romancini (born December 15, 1987) is a Brazilian former professional racing driver.

Romancini started his racing career in 2006 in the Brazilian Formula Renault 2.0 series. Driving for the Full Time Racing Team, he took two podium finishes, including one race win, to finish the season in fifth place. After his impressive debut season, Romancini moved up to the South American Formula Three championship in 2007 with leading team Cesário F3. During the season, he took ten podium places in fourteen races, including two wins, to finish runner-up in the championship behind teammate Clemente de Faria Jr.

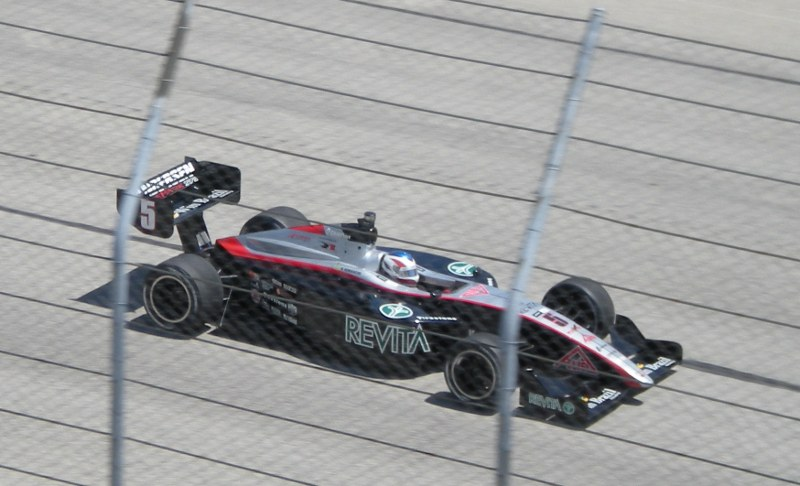
Romancini on his way to his first Indy Lights victory at the Milwaukee Mile in 2009

In November 2007, Romancini took part in World Series by Renault testing at both Paul Ricard and Valencia, driving for Epsilon Euskadi, Prema Powerteam and the reigning champions Tech 1 Racing. In January 2008, he was signed by Epsilon Euskadi to partner Frenchman and fellow rookie Alexandre Marsoin. During the season, he scored two points finishes and was lying 28th in the standings when he left the team due to sponsorship problems with two rounds of the championship remaining. He was replaced by former Epsilon driver Filipe Albuquerque. He then signed to race for Andersen Racing to race in the Firestone Indy Lights Series in 2009. He captured his first win in the series in his fifth start from the pole at the Milwaukee Mile. He ended the season with a victory in Homestead in the sixth place.

Romancini competed full–time in the IZOD INDYCAR Series for the 2010 season for Conquest Racing. He started his first and only Indianapolis 500 that year, where he finished thirteenth as the highest finishing rookie. Romancini also received sponsorship from Armando Montelongo, TV celebrity from Flip This House.

== Motorsports career results ==
=== Career summary ===
Season	Series	Team	Races	Wins	Poles	F/Laps	Podiums	Points	Position
2006	Formula Renault 2.0 Brazil	Full Time Racing	13	1	1	0	2	123	5th
2007	Formula Three Sudamericana	Cesário F3	14	2	2	0	10	85	**2nd**
2008	Formula Renault 3.5 Series	Epsilon Euskadi	13	0	0	0	0	3	29th
2009	Indy Lights	RLR/Andersen Racing	15	2	1	1	4	392	6th
2010	IndyCar Series	Conquest Racing	11	0	0	0	0	149	24th

=== Complete Formula Renault 3.5 Series results ===
(key)

Year	Entrant	1	2	3	4	5	6	7	8	9	10	11	12	13	14	15	16	17	DC	Points
2008	Epsilon Euskadi	MNZ; 1 Ret	MNZ; 2; 12	SPA; 1; 10	SPA; 2; 17	MON; 1; 23†	SIL; 1; 18	SIL; 2; 19	HUN; 1 Ret	HUN; 2 Ret	NÜR; 1; 9	NÜR; 2 Ret	LMS; 1 Ret	LMS; 2; 18	EST; 1	EST; 2	CAT; 1	CAT; 2	29th	3

^{†} Driver did not finish the race, but was classified as he completed more than 90% of the race distance.

=== American open–wheel racing results ===
(key) (Races in bold indicate pole position) (Races in italics indicate fastest lap)

==== Indy Lights ====
Year	Team	1	2	3	4	5	6	7	8	9	10	11	12	13	14	15	Rank	Points	Ref
2009	RLR/Andersen Racing	STP; 9	STP; 6	LBH; 24	KAN; 3	INDY; 3	**MIL**; 1	IOW; 4	WGL; 20	TOR; 6	EDM; 8	KTY; 10	MOH; 17	SNM; 9	CHI; 16	HMS; 1	**6th**	**392**	

==== IndyCar Series ====
Year	Team	No.	1	2	3	4	5	6	7	8	9	10	11	12	13	14	15	16	17	Rank	Points	Ref
2010	Conquest Racing	34	SAO; 17	STP; 13	ALA; 22	LBH; 23	KAN; 22	INDY; 13	TXS; 17	IOW; 16	WGL; 22	TOR; 22	EDM; 24	MOH	SNM	CHI	KTY	MOT	HMS	24th	149	

Years	Teams	Races	Poles	Wins	Podiums (Non-win)	Top 10s (Non-podium)	Indianapolis 500 Wins	Championships
1	1	11	0	0	0	0	0	0

==== Indianapolis 500 ====
Year	Chassis	Engine	Start	Finish	Team
2010	Dallara	Honda	27	13	Conquest
