= Alexandre Marsoin =

French racing driver

- Nationality: (France) French
- Born: March 25, 1989 (age 37) Saint-Brieuc (France)

Formula Three Euroseries career
- Debut season: 2009
- Former teams: SG Formula
- Starts: 4
- Wins: 0
- Poles: 0
- Fastest laps: 0
- Best finish: 32nd in 2009

Previous series
- 2005 2006–07 2006–07 2008–09: Formula Renault Campus France; French Formula Renault 2.0; Eurocup Formula Renault 2.0; Formula Renault 3.5 Series

Alexandre Marsoin (born March 25, 1989) is a French former professional racing driver.

== Career ==
=== Formula Renault ===
After an early career in karting, Marsoin made his racing debut in 2005 in the Formula Renault Campus France series, finishing the year in eighth position. The following year he moved up to the French Formula Renault championship with the Epsilon Sport team, taking a single podium finish and fastest lap on his way to twelfth in the standings. He also took part in two races of the Eurocup Formula Renault 2.0 championship.

For 2007, Marsoin continued in French Formula Renault whilst also taking part in a full Eurocup Formula Renault season. Driving for SG Formula in the French series, he took six podiums, including two race wins, to finish third in the championship, behind teammate and champion Jules Bianchi. In the Eurocup standings, he finished the year fourteenth overall.

=== Formula Renault 3.5 Series ===
In late 2007, Marsoin took part in Formula Renault 3.5 Series testing at the Circuit Paul Ricard and Circuit de Valencia with the Belgian KTR team, and in February 2008, he was signed by Spanish team Epsilon Euskadi to partner fellow rookie Mario Romancini.

During the 2008 season, Marsoin finished in the points on five occasions to end the year in nineteenth position, with his best race result being sixth-place finishes at both Spa-Francorchamps and Hungaroring. In the offseason, he tested for Tech 1 Racing, Prema Powerteam and Comtec Racing before signing for the latter in January 2009. However, he did not appear at any of the pre-season tests or the first round in Montmeló. He returned for the second round at Spa, but fell out with the team which led to him leaving the team during the weekend. He was replaced by Max Chilton for the next round.

=== Formula Three Euroseries ===
Marsoin replaced Jon Lancaster for the opening round of the 2009 Formula Three Euroseries season at Hockenheim. However, he left the team at Lausitz.

== Racing Record ==
=== Career Summary ===
Season	Series	Team	Races	Wins	Poles	F/Laps	Podiums	Points	Position
2005	Formula Renault Campus France	?	14	0	0	0	0	62	8th
2006	French Formula Renault 2.0	Epsilon Sport	13	0	0	1	1	26	12th
2006	Eurocup Formula Renault 2.0	SG Formula	2	0	0	0	0	0	N/A
2007	French Formula Renault 2.0	SG Formula	13	2	0	1	6	84	3rd
2007	Eurocup Formula Renault 2.0	SG Drivers Project	14	0	0	0	0	25	14th
2008	Formula Renault 3.5 Series	Epsilon Euskadi	17	0	0	0	0	17	19th
2009	Formula Renault 3.5 Series	Comtec Racing	1	0	0	0	0	0	NC
2009	Formula Three Euroseries	SG Formula	4	0	0	0	0	0	32nd

=== Complete Eurocup Formula Renault 2.0 results ===
(key) (Races in bold indicate pole position; races in italics indicate fastest lap)

Year	Entrant	1	2	3	4	5	6	7	8	9	10	11	12	13	14	DC	Points
2006	SG Formula	ZOL; 1	ZOL; 2	IST; 1	IST; 2	MIS; 1	MIS; 2	NÜR; 1	NÜR; 2	DON; 1	DON; 2	LMS; 1	LMS; 2	CAT; 1; 8	CAT; 2 Ret	NC†	0
2007	SG Drivers Project	ZOL; 1 Ret	ZOL; 2; 11	NÜR; 1; 27†	NÜR; 2; 18	HUN; 1; 16	HUN; 2; 11	DON; 1; 4	DON; 2; 6	MAG; 1; 20	MAG; 2; 17	EST; 1; 13	EST; 2; 6	CAT; 1; 5	CAT; 2; 11	14th	25

† As Marsoin was a guest driver, he was ineligible for points

=== Complete Formula Renault 3.5 Series results ===
(key) (Races in bold indicate pole position) (Races in italics indicate fastest lap)

Year	Team	1	2	3	4	5	6	7	8	9	10	11	12	13	14	15	16	17	Pos	Points
2008	Epsilon Euskadi	MNZ; 1; 14	MNZ; 2 Ret	SPA; 1; 6	SPA; 2; 7	MON; 1; 20	SIL; 1; 17	SIL; 2; 25	HUN; 1; 17	HUN; 2; 6	NÜR; 1 Ret	NÜR; 2; 16	LMS; 1; 11	LMS; 2; 10	EST; 1; 20	EST; 2; 16	CAT; 1; 9	CAT; 2; 15	19th	17
2009	Comtec Racing	CAT; 1	CAT; 2	SPA; 1 Ret	SPA; 2 DNS	MON; 1	HUN; 1	HUN; 2	SIL; 1	SIL; 2	BUG; 1	BUG; 2	ALG; 1	ALG; 2	NÜR; 1	NÜR; 2	ALC; 1	ALC; 2	NC	0
