= 2010 São Paulo Indy 300 =

(Brazil) 2010 Streets of São Paulo
Race details
- 1st round of the 2010 IndyCar Series season
- Date: March 14, 2010
- Official name: São Paulo Indy 300
- Location: Santana – São Paulo city
- Course: Temporary street circuit 2.536 mi / 4.081 km
- Distance: 61 laps 154.696 mi / 248.959 km
- Scheduled Distance: 75 laps 190.200 mi / 306.097 km
- Weather: 75 °F (24 °C), scattered clouds with intermittent rain showers

Pole position
- Driver: (United Kingdom) Dario Franchitti (Chip Ganassi Racing)
- Time: 1:27.7354

Fastest lap
- Driver: (Australia) Will Power (Team Penske)
- Time: 1:28.1892 (on lap 60 of 61)

Podium
- First: (Australia) Will Power (Team Penske)
- Second: (United States) Ryan Hunter-Reay (Andretti Autosport)
- Third: (Brazil) Vítor Meira (A. J. Foyt Enterprises)

The 2010 São Paulo Indy 300 was the first race of the 2010 IZOD IndyCar Series season. The race took place on March 14, on the 2.536-mile (4.081 km) temporary street circuit in São Paulo, Brazil, and was telecast by Versus in the United States. Originally scheduled for 190.2 miles (306.1 km), the race was shortened to 154.696 miles (248.959 km) due to a two-hour time limit brought about by an extended red-flag period due to heavy rain.

The race was won by Australian driver Will Power for Team Penske. Power was making his race return after an incident during a practice session at the 2009 Indy Grand Prix of Sonoma, which left him with two broken vertebrae in his back. Second place went to Ryan Hunter-Reay, who was making his first start for Andretti Autosport, and third place went to another returnee, A. J. Foyt Enterprises' Vítor Meira. Meira was making his first start since suffering similar injuries to Power, during the 2009 Indianapolis 500.

Four drivers made their IndyCar Series débuts in the race. Former Formula One driver Takuma Sato, Firestone Indy Lights graduates Ana Beatriz and Mario Romancini, and Atlantic Championship title contender Simona de Silvestro were all classified outside the top ten at the conclusion of the race, with de Silvestro leading four laps during the race.

== Report ==
=== Background ===
Plans for an IndyCar Series race in Brazil were confirmed on 25 November 2009, with authorities in São Paulo and the Indy Racing League agreeing to a deal for the city to host the series. Race details for the São Paulo Indy 300 were announced on 25 January 2010. It was the first American open-wheel race in the country since the Rio 200 at Jacarepaguá in 2000. Despite a lengthy distance to travel from most team bases, the event promoters offered each team a six-figure sum of money, as well as paying for all expenses. A total of seven Brazilian drivers would compete in the race, including Ana Beatriz, Hélio Castroneves, Tony Kanaan, Raphael Matos, Vítor Meira, Mario Moraes and Mario Romancini. Of those seven, four drivers—Beatriz, Castroneves, Moraes and Romancini—are natives of São Paulo. The race was scheduled to have two practice sessions on Saturday morning, qualifications on Saturday afternoon with the race on Sunday afternoon. In preparation for the race weekend, the public roads that made up areas of the track were closed off just before midnight on Friday evening.

=== Practice and qualifying ===
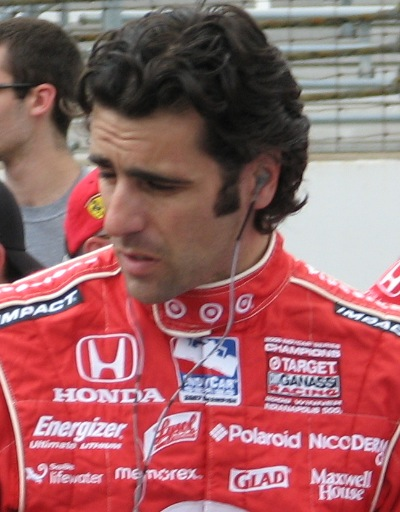
Dario Franchitti won the pole position, the 24th of his career.

In the first practice session, Chip Ganassi Racing driver Scott Dixon recorded the fastest lap, ahead of Team Penske's Ryan Briscoe, the Andretti Autosport car of Tony Kanaan and Briscoe's teammate Will Power. Due to the slippery nature of the circuit, drivers were caught out and ended up inflicting damage to their cars. Defending series champion Dario Franchitti ventured down the escape road before damaging his suspension against the Turn 8 wall. He ended the session in seventeenth position. Other drivers to hit the wall included Romancini and Milka Duno. Incidents continued in the second practice session, with no less than five drivers spinning or making contact with the outside retaining walls. The session saw the same top four drivers as the first session.

Having observed the sessions and received feedback from the drivers and the teams about the circuit conditions, the series' president of competition Brian Barnhart and course designer Tony Cotman opted to postpone the qualification session to race morning, with the running of a third practice session and a Sunday morning warm-up instead of it. Power topped this extra session, ahead of Kanaan and Ryan Hunter-Reay, with Justin Wilson—a new arrival at Dreyer & Reinbold Racing—in fourth position. After the session, track officials started grinding down the concrete in order to provide a track surface that was suitable for racing the following day. Hunter-Reay topped the Sunday morning warmup before qualifying, setting the fastest lap time by over half a second ahead of second-year driver Mike Conway in another Dreyer & Reinbold car.

Qualifying followed the usual road and street course system, with the field being split into two groups. In the first group of twelve runners, Wilson topped the session, 0.46 seconds ahead of the HVM Racing machine of Switzerland's Simona de Silvestro—one of four female drivers in the race—with Alex Tagliani in third position. Other drivers to make it into the second session of qualifying were Power, Takuma Sato and Raphael Matos. The remaining twelve drivers took part in the second group, with Hunter-Reay topping his second session of the day. Hélio Castroneves, Briscoe, Franchitti, Dixon and Kanaan were the other competitors in the top six, and thus progressed to the second round of qualifying. In the Top 12, Power recorded the fastest lap time, holding off the British pair Wilson and Franchitti. Hunter-Reay, Kanaan and Tagliani finished between fourth and sixth, and would be the other half of the drivers that progressed to the Fast Six. Franchitti saved his best lap of qualifying to the last possible moment, taking his thirteenth career IndyCar Series pole position, and his 24th in American open-wheel racing. Tagliani took second on the grid, on his début with the FAZZT Race Team. Wilson took third ahead of Hunter-Reay, Power and Kanaan.

=== Race ===
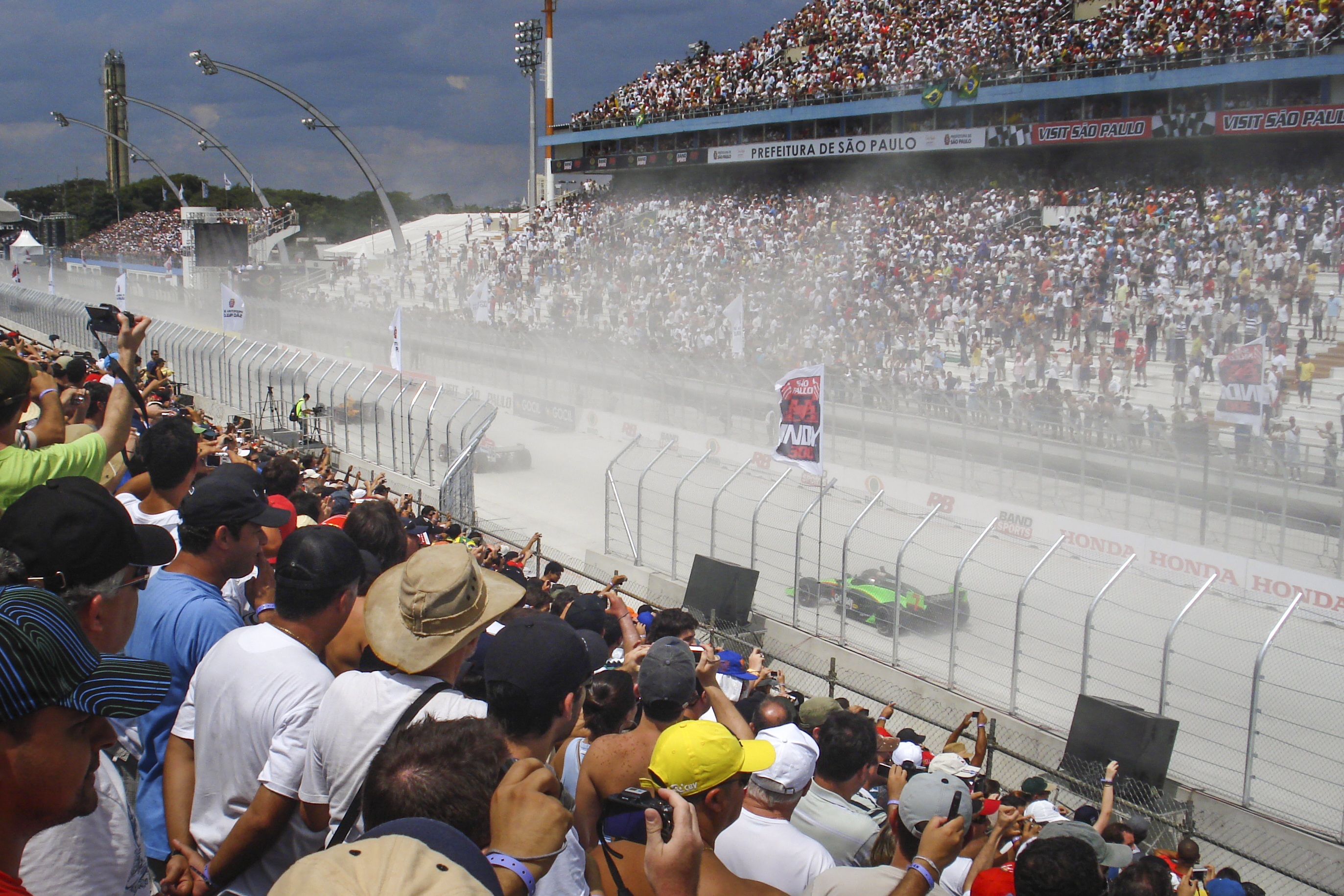
Clouds of dust hampering the drivers' visibility during the race start

Minutes before the race start, reports of rain falling on the track caused the start to be delayed by around ten minutes. Race control eventually deemed the race to be dry enough to be called a dry race, thus the rain tyres were not necessary, but would be required later in the race. Dario Franchitti and Alex Tagliani led the field to the line, with the circuit still being dusty from the previous night's repair work. Dust clouds engulfed the start-finish straight, blinding many of the midfield runners. The top five runners managed to negotiate the first chicane cleanly, while behind, half a dozen cars were involved in a first-corner crash. Takuma Sato misjudged his braking into the first corner and clipped the rear of Will Power's Penske machine, which spun him into Scott Dixon. Hélio Castroneves could not avoid running into Dixon's stationary car at the first corner. After many drivers went down the escape road to avoid being involved in the crash, a separate accident took place between Marco Andretti and Mario Moraes. Moraes lost control of his KV Racing Technology car behind Ana Beatriz, hit Andretti and became airborne before coming to rest across the cockpit of Andretti's car. It took several minutes to extricate Andretti from his damaged machinery, but was uninjured and very critical of Moraes' driving. The crash resulted in a seven-lap caution period, and eliminated Sato, Moraes and Andretti from the race. Dixon and Castroneves both recovered to the pit lane to repair damage.

Franchitti led the field to the restart on lap eight, ahead of Tagliani, Hunter-Reay (up from fourth), Kanaan (up from sixth), and Matos, who advanced seven positions while avoiding the mêlée at turn one. Franchitti became only the third driver in series history to lead the final lap of one season and the first lap of the next, having won the championship by winning the 2009 Firestone Indy 300 at Homestead-Miami Speedway. The top five remained the same until lap 15 when Dan Wheldon passed the De Ferran Luczo Dragon Racing car of Matos for fifth place. Hunter-Reay took second place from Tagliani into the final hairpin on lap 19, before Milka Duno brought out the second caution of the afternoon on lap 22 by nudging her Dale Coyne Racing car into the wall at turn four. The entire field except for Simona de Silvestro headed to pit road for the first of two scheduled pit stops. De Silvestro became the first rookie driver since Graham Rahal in 2008 to lead at least one lap on début.

When the race returned to green flag conditions on lap 26, de Silvestro held the lead ahead of Franchitti, Hunter-Reay and Kanaan with Tagliani in fifth position. De Silvestro kept the lead for a further two laps, with Hunter-Reay's Andretti Autosport car moving ahead of Franchitti on lap 27, repeating his move on Tagliani on the defending series champion. Not long after, Hunter-Reay moved ahead of de Silvestro as the pair were under braking for turn five. Hunter-Reay nearly lost control of his car as his car bottomed out on the straight, with lifted the car slightly airborne. Franchitti further demoted the young Swiss driver to third, moving ahead on lap 29. Behind them, Hideki Mutoh hit Vítor Meira which saw his retirement from the race, and Wheldon hit the back of Tagliani which sent him into Kanaan, resulting in the retirement of the Canadian driver. Rain started falling once again, more heavily than before and much of the field pitted to change from dry-weather tyres to wet-weather ones. Alex Lloyd aquaplaned into the wall in the second Dale Coyne car, bringing out the caution for the third time, and with rain falling relentlessly, series officials brought out the red flag to allow the weather conditions to pass. After a 36-minute red flag delay, cars returned to the circuit with slicks being the choice of tyre for the track, despite a few wet patches remaining on the circuit. Some cars gambled on wets thinking that the circuit would not dry quickly enough for their tyres to drop off compared to the slicks.

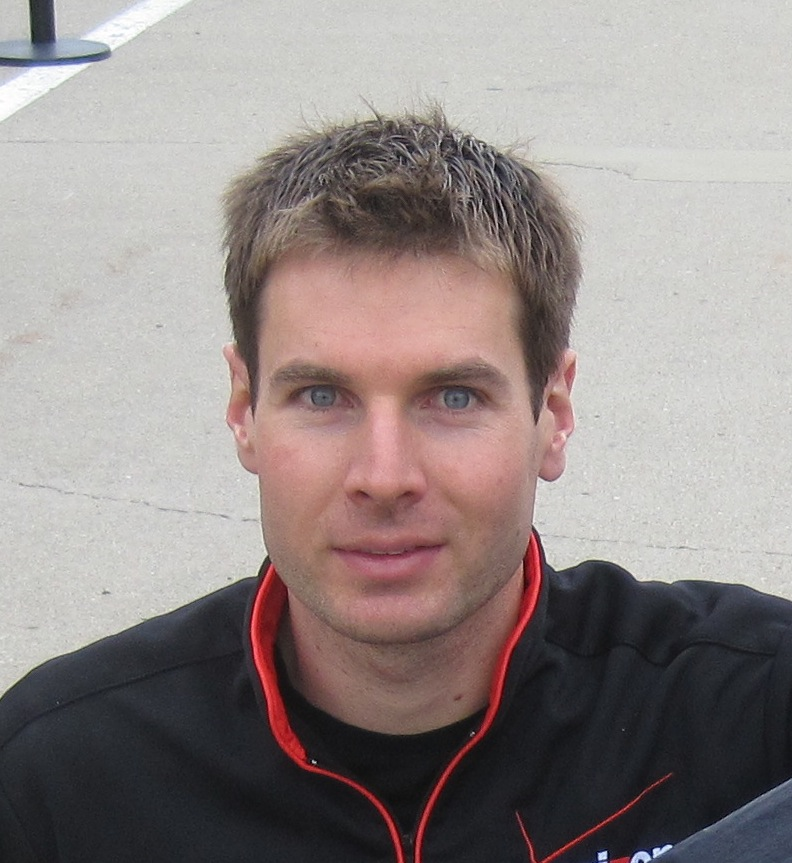
Will Power won the race after overtaking Ryan Hunter-Reay on lap 57.

As the green flag flew on lap 38, Chip Ganassi Racing held a one–two with Franchitti leading Dixon, with two of the Dreyer & Reinbold cars—Conway and Wilson—holding third and fourth places, with the only remaining KV car of E. J. Viso holding fifth, the Venezuelan disposing of Castroneves just after the restart. Realising that the gamble had backfired, the lead quintet pitted on laps 41 and 42, which cycled Hunter-Reay back through to the lead. Power made an error which allowed Matos and Briscoe to move ahead of him. Briscoe moved ahead of Matos on lap 45 and set off in chase of Hunter-Reay. Four laps later, the Australian was on the American's tail, and moved ahead after an outbraking move into the final hairpin. Hunter-Reay immediately regained the position into the first chicane on Lap 51, before Briscoe sealed the place with a similar final hairpin move at the end of the lap. Briscoe's luck would run out, however, when he overcooked it into turn five on lap 54, and nudged the barriers with his nose assembly, bringing out the fourth and final caution of the race. The time limit meant that only six laps remained at the restart, with Hunter-Reay leading Power, Matos, Meira and Wheldon. Meira soon passed his fellow Brazilian for third on Lap 57, and began to chase down the lead duo, who had changed positions after Power used the slipstream to overtake Hunter-Reay into the final corner. Power moved away from Hunter-Reay in the final laps, taking the chequered flag to cap his return from injury with a victory. Hunter-Reay took his best result for a year in second, with another injury returnee, Meira, finishing third. Matos was fourth, holding off seven other cars, as fourth to eleventh were covered by 3.49 seconds at the race's conclusion. Wheldon led those seven in fifth, ahead of the Ganassis, Conway, Castroneves, Kanaan and Wilson. Viso finished twelfth ahead of top rookie Beatriz, a recovering Briscoe, Danica Patrick and de Silvestro, the final two off the lead lap.

== Classification ==
=== Qualifying ===
- All cars were split into two groups of twelve, with the fastest six from each group going through to the "Top 12" session. In this session, the fastest six runners progressed to the "Firestone Fast Six". The fastest driver in the final session claimed pole, with the rest of the runners lining up in session order, regardless of qualifying times. (Fast Six from 1–6, Top 12 from 7-12 and Round 1 from 13 to 24, with Group 1 drivers occupying the odd-numbered grid positions, and Group 2 drivers occupying the even-numbered grid positions).

Qualifying results
Pos	No.	Driver	Team	Group 1	Group 2	Top 12	Fast 6
1	10	Dario Franchitti (GBR)	Chip Ganassi Racing		1:28.1779	1:27.6841	1:27.7354
2	77	Alex Tagliani (CAN)	FAZZT Race Team	1:28.8134		1:27.8474	1:27.7676
3	22	Justin Wilson (GBR)	Dreyer & Reinbold Racing	1:28.2275		1:27.6180	1:27.8183
4	37	Ryan Hunter-Reay (USA)	Andretti Autosport		1:27.9184	1:27.7474	1:27.8756
5	12	Will Power (AUS)	Team Penske	1:28.9942		1:27.5030	1:28.0156
6	11	Tony Kanaan (BRA)	Andretti Autosport		1:28.2794	1:27.8382	1:28.6946
7	9	Scott Dixon (NZL)	Chip Ganassi Racing		1:28.2184	1:28.0104	
8	6	Ryan Briscoe (AUS)	Team Penske		1:28.0110	1:28.1176	
9	3	Hélio Castroneves (BRA)	Team Penske		1:27.9451	1:28.1200	
10	5	Takuma Sato (JPN) (R)	KV Racing Technology	1:29.6382		1:28.2679	
11	78	Simona de Silvestro (SUI) (R)	HVM Racing	1:28.6879		1:28.8691	
12	2	Raphael Matos (BRA)	Luczo Dragon Racing de Ferran Motorsports	1:29.9423		1:29.0994	
13	7	Danica Patrick (USA)	Andretti Autosport	1:30.1253			
14	06	Hideki Mutoh (JPN)	Newman/Haas/Lanigan Racing		1:28.4659		
15	19	Alex Lloyd (GBR) (R)	Dale Coyne Racing	1:30.4641			
16	14	Vítor Meira (BRA)	A. J. Foyt Enterprises		1:29.1131		
17	8	E. J. Viso (VEN)	KV Racing Technology	1:30.4947			
18	4	Dan Wheldon (GBR)	Panther Racing		1:29.1960		
19	24	Mike Conway (GBR)	Dreyer & Reinbold Racing	1:33.7584			
20	34	Mario Romancini (BRA) (R)	Conquest Racing		1:30.8838		
21	26	Marco Andretti (USA)	Andretti Autosport	1:39.6813			
22	23	Ana Beatriz (BRA) (R)	Dreyer & Reinbold Racing		1:32.4161		
23	32	Mario Moraes (BRA)	KV Racing Technology	no time			
24	18	Milka Duno (VEN)	Dale Coyne Racing		1:36.0065		

=== Race ===
Race results
Pos	No.	Driver	Team	Laps Completed	Time/Retired	Grid	Laps	Points
1	12	Will Power (AUS)	Team Penske	61	2:00:57.7112	5	4	50
2	37	Ryan Hunter-Reay (USA)	Andretti Autosport	61	+ 1.8581	4	20	40
3	14	Vítor Meira (BRA)	A. J. Foyt Enterprises	61	+ 9.7094	16	0	35
4	2	Raphael Matos (BRA)	Luczo Dragon Racing de Ferran Motorsports	61	+ 10.4235	12	0	32
5	4	Dan Wheldon (GBR)	Panther Racing	61	+ 10.8883	18	0	30
6	9	Scott Dixon (NZL)	Chip Ganassi Racing	61	+ 11.3473	7	0	28
7	10	Dario Franchitti (GBR)	Chip Ganassi Racing	61	+ 12.0579	1	29	29
8	24	Mike Conway (GBR)	Dreyer & Reinbold Racing	61	+ 12.1654	19	0	24
9	3	Hélio Castroneves (BRA)	Team Penske	61	+ 12.7411	9	0	22
10	11	Tony Kanaan (BRA)	Andretti Autosport	61	+ 13.4850	6	0	20
11	22	Justin Wilson (GBR)	Dreyer & Reinbold Racing	61	+ 13.9193	3	0	19
12	8	E. J. Viso (VEN)	KV Racing Technology	61	+ 16.9039	17	0	18
13	23	Ana Beatriz (BRA)	Dreyer & Reinbold Racing	61	+ 19.6451	22	0	17
14	6	Ryan Briscoe (AUS)	Team Penske	61	+ 1:24.9191	8	4	16
15	7	Danica Patrick (USA)	Andretti Autosport	60	+ 1 Lap	13	0	15
16	78	Simona de Silvestro (SWI)	HVM Racing	58	+ 3 Laps	11	4	14
17	34	Mario Romancini (BRA)	Conquest Racing	46	Contact	20	0	13
18	19	Alex Lloyd (GBR)	Dale Coyne Racing	30	Contact	15	0	12
19	77	Alex Tagliani (CAN)	FAZZT Race Team	28	Contact	2	0	12
20	06	Hideki Mutoh (JPN)	Newman/Haas/Lanigan Racing	27	Contact	14	0	12
21	18	Milka Duno (VEN)	Dale Coyne Racing	20	Contact	24	0	12
22	5	Takuma Sato (JPN)	KV Racing Technology	0	Contact	10	0	12
23	26	Marco Andretti (USA)	Andretti Autosport	0	Contact	21	0	12
24	32	Mario Moraes (BRA)	KV Racing Technology	0	Contact	23	0	12

== Championship standings after the race ==
Drivers' Championship standings
Pos	Driver	Points
1	Will Power (AUS)	50
2	Ryan Hunter-Reay (USA)	40 (–10)
3	Vítor Meira (BRA)	35 (–15)
4	Raphael Matos (BRA)	32 (–18)
5	Dan Wheldon (GBR)	30 (–20)

- Note: Only the top five positions are included.

Previous race: none	IndyCar Series; 2010 season	Next race: 2010 Honda Grand Prix of St. Petersburg
Previous race: none	São Paulo Indy 300	Next race: 2011 São Paulo Indy 300
