= 2008 Formula Renault 3.5 Series =

Seasons
- ← 2007 2009 →

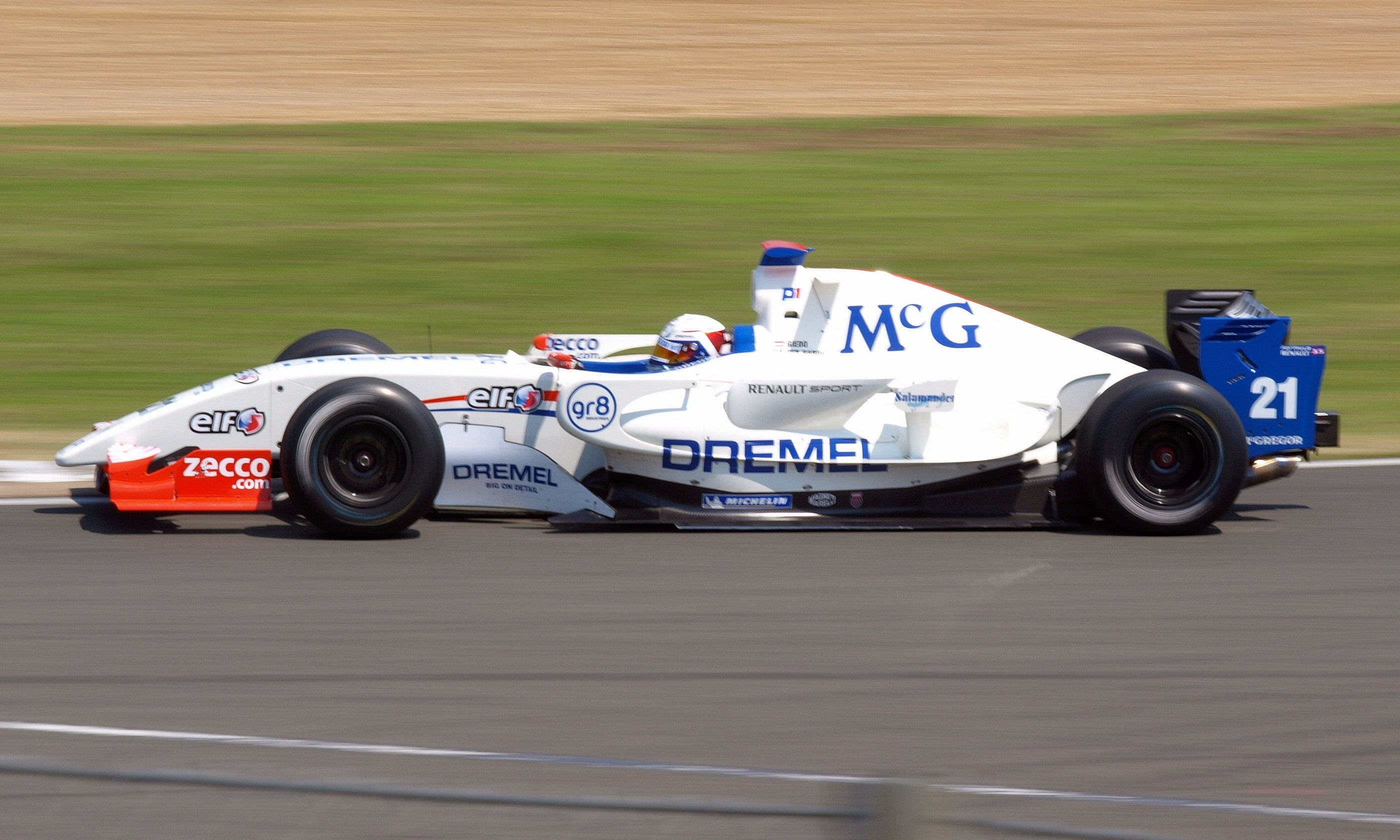
The Drivers' Championship was won by Dutch driver Giedo van der Garde.

The 2008 Formula Renault 3.5 Series was the fourth Formula Renault 3.5 Series season. It began on 26 April in Monza, Italy and finished on 19 October in Barcelona, Spain after 17 races.

== Regulation Changes ==
=== Technical ===
After a three-year cycle, the current Formula Renault 3.5 chassis was replaced by a brand new car built by Italian racecar constructor Dallara. The new car featured flex-fuel technology and could be powered by either premium unleaded petrol or E85 bioethanol, which was a first for this level of motorsport in Europe. The Renault V6 engine, prepared by French company Solution F, also saw its power increased from 425 horsepower (317 kW) to 500 horsepower (370 kW).

The car also featured a new carbon bodyshell, as well as a new shaped front wing, hollowed sidepods and multiple side deflectors designed to improve aerodynamic performance. However, several areas of the car, including the gearbox, rear suspension and carbon brakes, remained the same in order to keep costs under control.

The new car made its first public appearance on 21 September at the Magny-Cours round of the 2007 season, with development driver Andy Soucek demonstrating the car at the final round of the series in Barcelona.

=== Sporting ===
In a change from recent years, only 26 cars (thirteen two-car teams) were allowed into the 2008 championship. The World Series by Renault organising committee announced twelve of the thirteen teams on 5 October 2007, with newcomers Ultimate Signature confirmed as the final entrant on 12 October 2007.

The 2008 season also saw the introduction of a new qualifying system to the FR3.5 Series.

- The 26 cars will be split into two equal groups, with each having a 20-minute session
- The Top 6 drivers in each group (12 in total) will go forward to a 15-minute 'Super Pole' session
- The grid for Race one is decided by reversing the finishing order of the Top 8 drivers in Super Pole. They are followed by the last four in Super Pole (in finishing order) and the remaining 14 drivers in the order they finished qualifying
- For Race two, the Top 8 drivers from Super Pole line up in the order they finished the session, with the rest of the field decided by the finishing order of Race one

== Teams and drivers ==
R = Series rookie for 2008

| Team | No. | Driver name | Status | Rounds |
|---|---|---|---|---|
| (France) Tech 1 Racing | 1 | (France) Julien Jousse | | All |
| (France) Tech 1 Racing | 2 | (France) Charles Pic | R | All |
| (Italy) International DracoRacing | 3 | (Belgium) Bertrand Baguette | | All |
| (Italy) International DracoRacing | 4 | (Spain) Marco Barba | | All |
| (United Kingdom) Carlin Motorsport | 5 | (Russia) Mikhail Aleshin | | All |
| (United Kingdom) Carlin Motorsport | 6 | (Canada) Robert Wickens | | All |
| (Spain) Epsilon Euskadi | 7 | (Brazil) Mario Romancini | R | 1–7 |
| (Spain) Epsilon Euskadi | 7 | (Portugal) Filipe Albuquerque | | 8–9 |
| (Spain) Epsilon Euskadi | 8 | (France) Alexandre Marsoin | R | All |
| (Italy) Prema Powerteam | 9 | (Spain) Miguel Molina | | All |
| (Italy) Prema Powerteam | 10 | (Spain) Álvaro Barba | | All |
| (Italy) RC Motorsport | 11 | (Spain) Aleix Alcaraz | R | 1–4 |
| (Italy) RC Motorsport | 11 | (Brazil) Claudio Cantelli | R | 5–9 |
| (Italy) RC Motorsport | 12 | (Spain) Borja García | | 1–3 |
| (Italy) RC Motorsport | 12 | (United Kingdom) Duncan Tappy | R | 4–5, 8–9 |
| (Italy) RC Motorsport | 12 | (Italy) Paolo Maria Nocera | R | 6–7 |
| (Spain) Pons Racing | 14 | (Spain) Máximo Cortés | R | 1–4 |
| (Spain) Pons Racing | 14 | (Spain) Aleix Alcaraz | R | 5–9 |
| (Spain) Pons Racing | 15 | (Spain) Marcos Martínez | | All |
| (Belgium) KTR | 16 | (Russia) Daniil Move | | 1–5 |
| (Belgium) KTR | 16 | (Spain) Siso Cunill | R | 6–9 |
| (Belgium) KTR | 17 | (France) Guillaume Moreau | | 1–5 |
| (Belgium) KTR | 17 | (Russia) Sergey Afanasyev | R | 7–9 |
| (Austria) Interwetten.com Racing | 19 | (Mexico) Salvador Durán | | All |
| (Austria) Interwetten.com Racing | 20 | (Mexico) Pablo Sánchez López | R | All |
| (United Kingdom) P1 Motorsport | 21 | (Netherlands) Giedo van der Garde | | All |
| (United Kingdom) P1 Motorsport | 22 | (United Kingdom) Pippa Mann | | All |
| (United Kingdom) Fortec Motorsport | 23 | (United Kingdom) James Walker | | All |
| (United Kingdom) Fortec Motorsport | 24 | (Germany) Julian Theobald | | 1–2 |
| (United Kingdom) Fortec Motorsport | 24 | (Malaysia) Fairuz Fauzy | | 3–9 |
| (United Kingdom) Red Devil Comtec Racing | 25 | (Italy) Marco Bonanomi | | All |
| (United Kingdom) Red Devil Comtec Racing | 26 | (Italy) Pasquale Di Sabatino | | 1–7 |
| (United Kingdom) Red Devil Comtec Racing | 26 | (Estonia) Sten Pentus | R | 9 |
| (France) Ultimate Signature | 27 | (Brazil) Fabio Carbone | | All |
| (France) Ultimate Signature | 28 | (Brazil) Claudio Cantelli | R | 1–3 |
| (France) Ultimate Signature | 28 | (Argentina) Esteban Guerrieri | | 4–9 |

== Race calendar and results ==
The calendar for the 2008 season was confirmed by Renault Sport on 9 January 2008. Seven rounds formed meetings of the 2008 World Series by Renault season, with additional rounds supporting the Monza 1000km and Monaco Grand Prix.

| Round | | Circuit | Date | Pole position | Fastest lap | Winning driver | Winning team | Rookie winner |
|---|---|---|---|---|---|---|---|---|
| 1 | R1 | (Italy) Autodromo Nazionale Monza | 26 April | | (Spain) Marcos Martínez | (Netherlands) Giedo van der Garde | (United Kingdom) P1 Motorsport | (Mexico) Pablo Sánchez López |
| 1 | R2 | (Italy) Autodromo Nazionale Monza | 27 April | (Netherlands) Giedo van der Garde | (Netherlands) Giedo van der Garde | (Netherlands) Giedo van der Garde | (United Kingdom) P1 Motorsport | (France) Charles Pic |
| 2 | R1 | (Belgium) Circuit de Spa-Francorchamps | 3 May | | (Netherlands) Giedo van der Garde | (Belgium) Bertrand Baguette | (Italy) International DracoRacing | (France) Alexandre Marsoin |
| 2 | R2 | (Belgium) Circuit de Spa-Francorchamps | 4 May | (Italy) Marco Bonanomi | (Netherlands) Giedo van der Garde | (Netherlands) Giedo van der Garde | (United Kingdom) P1 Motorsport | (France) Alexandre Marsoin |
| 3 | R1 | Circuit de Monaco | 25 May | (France) Charles Pic | (France) Charles Pic | (France) Charles Pic | (France) Tech 1 Racing | (France) Charles Pic |
| 4 | R1 | (United Kingdom) Silverstone Circuit | 7 June | | (Mexico) Salvador Durán | (Mexico) Salvador Durán | (Austria) Interwetten.com Racing | (Spain) Máximo Cortés |
| 4 | R2 | (United Kingdom) Silverstone Circuit | 8 June | (Canada) Robert Wickens | (Mexico) Salvador Durán | (Canada) Robert Wickens | (United Kingdom) Carlin Motorsport | (France) Charles Pic |
| 5 | R1 | (Hungary) Hungaroring | 5 July | | (France) Julien Jousse | (Netherlands) Giedo van der Garde | (United Kingdom) P1 Motorsport | (United Kingdom) Duncan Tappy |
| 5 | R2 | (Hungary) Hungaroring | 6 July | (Brazil) Fabio Carbone | (Brazil) Fabio Carbone | (Brazil) Fabio Carbone | (France) Ultimate Signature | (France) Alexandre Marsoin |
| 6 | R1 | (Germany) Nürburgring | 30 August | | (Brazil) Fabio Carbone | (Brazil) Fabio Carbone | (France) Ultimate Signature | (Mexico) Pablo Sánchez López |
| 6 | R2 | (Germany) Nürburgring | 31 August | (Netherlands) Giedo van der Garde | (France) Julien Jousse | (Spain) Miguel Molina | (Italy) Prema Powerteam | (Mexico) Pablo Sánchez López |
| 7 | R1 | (France) Bugatti Circuit | 6 September | | (Canada) Robert Wickens | (France) Charles Pic | (France) Tech 1 Racing | (France) Charles Pic |
| 7 | R2 | (France) Bugatti Circuit | 7 September | (Argentina) Esteban Guerrieri | (Canada) Robert Wickens | (Netherlands) Giedo van der Garde | (United Kingdom) P1 Motorsport | (France) Charles Pic |
| 8 | R1 | (Portugal) Autódromo do Estoril | 27 September | | (Spain) Álvaro Barba | (Brazil) Fabio Carbone | (France) Ultimate Signature | (Mexico) Pablo Sánchez López |
| 8 | R2 | (Portugal) Autódromo do Estoril | 28 September | (Spain) Miguel Molina | (France) Charles Pic | (Spain) Miguel Molina | (Italy) Prema Powerteam | (France) Charles Pic |
| 9 | R1 | (Spain) Circuit de Catalunya | 18 October | | (Canada) Robert Wickens | (France) Julien Jousse | (France) Tech 1 Racing | (France) Charles Pic |
| 9 | R2 | (Spain) Circuit de Catalunya | 19 October | (Argentina) Esteban Guerrieri | (Mexico) Salvador Durán | (Argentina) Esteban Guerrieri | (France) Ultimate Signature | (France) Charles Pic |

== Season results ==
- Points for both championships were awarded as follows:

| Race | | | | | | | | | | | Qualifying | | |
| Position | 1st | 2nd | 3rd | 4th | 5th | 6th | 7th | 8th | 9th | 10th | PP | 2nd | 3rd |
|---|---|---|---|---|---|---|---|---|---|---|---|---|---|
| **Sprint** | 12 | 10 | 8 | 7 | 6 | 5 | 4 | 3 | 2 | 1 | | | |
| **Feature** | 15 | 12 | 10 | 8 | 6 | 5 | 4 | 3 | 2 | 1 | **4** | 2 | 1 |

The maximum number of points a driver could earn each weekend (except Monaco) was 31 and the maximum number for a team was 55.

=== Drivers' Championship ===
| Pos | Driver | MNZ SPR (Italy) | MNZ FEA (Italy) | SPA SPR (Belgium) | SPA FEA (Belgium) | MON FEA (Monaco) | SIL SPR (United Kingdom) | SIL FEA (United Kingdom) | HUN SPR (Hungary) | HUN FEA (Hungary) | NÜR SPR (Germany) | NÜR FEA (Germany) | LMS SPR (France) | LMS FEA (France) | EST SPR (Portugal) | EST FEA (Portugal) | CAT SPR (Spain) | CAT FEA (Spain) | Points |
|---|---|---|---|---|---|---|---|---|---|---|---|---|---|---|---|---|---|---|---|
| 1 | (Netherlands) Giedo van der Garde | 1 | **1** | Ret | 1 | 2 | 5 | 2 | 1 | 21† | 2 | **7** | DNS | 1 | 8 | 8 | DNS | Ret | 137 |
| 2 | (France) Julien Jousse | 3 | 4 | Ret | Ret | 4 | 7 | 10 | 2 | 2 | Ret | 2 | 9 | 15 | 4 | 3 | 1 | 5 | 106 |
| 3 | (Brazil) Fabio Carbone | DSQ | Ret | 15 | Ret | 12 | 4 | 5 | 3 | **1** | 1 | 6 | 3 | 2 | 1 | Ret | 5 | 10 | 97 |
| 4 | (Spain) Miguel Molina | Ret | Ret | **9** | 6 | 9 | 23 | Ret | Ret | 3 | Ret | 1 | **2** | 5 | 7 | **1** | Ret | 7 | 79 |
| 5 | (Russia) Mikhail Aleshin | 5 | 5 | 5 | 3 | 6 | Ret | 18 | 9 | 15 | 3 | DNS | 6 | 4 | 9 | 23† | 2 | 14 | 73 |
| 6 | (France) Charles Pic | 9 | 3 | Ret | 12 | **1** | 15 | 13 | **18**† | 9 | Ret | 12 | 1 | 6 | Ret | 2 | 8 | 8 | 69 |
| 7 | (Belgium) Bertrand Baguette | **Ret** | Ret | 1 | 11 | 5 | 6 | 16 | 4 | 4 | 5 | 5 | Ret | 16 | Ret | 4 | Ret | 4 | 69 |
| 8 | (Argentina) Esteban Guerrieri | | | | | | 22 | 4 | Ret | 12 | 12 | 9 | 4 | **3** | 5 | 6 | Ret | **1** | 62 |
| 9 | (Mexico) Salvador Durán | Ret | 14 | 2 | 4 | 16 | 1 | 3 | Ret | 16 | 4 | DSQ | 7 | 7 | 16 | 22† | Ret | 12 | 61 |
| 10 | (Spain) Álvaro Barba | Ret | 2 | DNS | 10 | 14 | **3** | 8 | Ret | 5 | Ret | 3 | NC | 12 | 2 | Ret | 6 | Ret | 58 |
| 11 | (Italy) Marco Bonanomi | Ret | DSQ | 4 | **2** | 13 | 8 | 9 | 5 | 13 | Ret | 4 | 5 | 11 | **Ret** | 5 | Ret | DNS | 56 |
| 12 | (Canada) Robert Wickens | Ret | Ret | 14 | Ret | 19 | 9 | **1** | Ret | 8 | 13 | 18 | 14 | 22 | 3 | 12 | 3 | 3 | 55 |
| 13 | (United Kingdom) James Walker | 7 | 7 | Ret | 16 | 8 | 10 | 12 | 7 | 10 | Ret | 13 | Ret | 9 | Ret | 14 | 7 | 2 | 36 |
| 14 | (Spain) Marco Barba | 12 | 8 | Ret | 20 | 24† | 12 | 7 | 10 | 7 | Ret | 10 | 10 | 8 | 6 | 10 | 16† | Ret | 24 |
| 15 | (Spain) Marcos Martínez | Ret | Ret | Ret | 9 | 15 | 2 | 6 | 13 | Ret | 11 | 11 | 15 | 24 | 11 | 7 | Ret | Ret | 21 |
| 16 | (France) Guillaume Moreau | 8 | 6 | 3 | 14 | 7 | 13 | 11 | Ret | Ret | | | | | | | | | 20 |
| 17 | (Mexico) Pablo Sánchez López | 4 | Ret | 8 | Ret | 21 | 21 | 24 | 8 | Ret | 6 | 8 | Ret | 17 | 13 | 21 | 12 | Ret | 18 |
| 18 | (Malaysia) Fairuz Fauzy | | | | | 3 | Ret | 15 | 12 | 14 | **DSQ** | Ret | 13 | 19 | 12 | 20 | **Ret** | 6 | 17 |
| 19 | (France) Alexandre Marsoin | 14 | Ret | 6 | 7 | 20 | 17 | 25 | 17 | 6 | Ret | 16 | 11 | 10 | 20 | 16 | 9 | 15 | 17 |
| 20 | (Italy) Pasquale Di Sabatino | 2 | 10 | 13 | 8 | 25† | 11 | 14 | 11 | 11 | Ret | 15 | 12 | 14 | | | | | 16 |
| 21 | (Portugal) Filipe Albuquerque | | | | | | | | | | | | | | 10 | 9 | 4 | 9 | 12 |
| 22 | (Russia) Daniil Move | 13 | 13 | 11 | 5 | 22 | 24† | 23 | 16 | 20 | | | | | | | | | 6 |
| 23 | (United Kingdom) Duncan Tappy | | | | | | 16 | 21 | 6 | 19 | | | | | 14 | 11 | 10 | Ret | 6 |
| 24 | (Spain) Borja García | 6 | Ret | Ret | 15 | 11 | | | | | | | | | | | | | 5 |
| 25 | (United Kingdom) Pippa Mann | 10 | 11 | 16 | Ret | 18 | 19 | 20 | 15 | Ret | 7 | 19 | Ret | Ret | Ret | 15 | 13 | 13 | 5 |
| 26 | (Spain) Máximo Cortés | 17 | 16 | 7 | 13 | 10 | 14 | 17 | | | | | | | | | | | 5 |
| 27 | (Spain) Aleix Alcaraz | 11 | 9 | Ret | 18 | Ret | 20 | 22 | Ret | 18 | Ret | Ret | 8 | 13 | 15 | 13 | 11 | 11 | 5 |
| 28 | (Brazil) Claudio Cantelli | 16 | Ret | 12 | 19 | 17 | | | 14 | 17 | 8 | 17 | 16 | 20 | 18 | 17 | Ret | 16 | 3 |
| 29 | (Brazil) Mario Romancini | Ret | 12 | 10 | 17 | 23† | 18 | 19 | Ret | Ret | 9 | Ret | Ret | 18 | | | | | 3 |
| 30 | (Spain) Siso Cunill | | | | | | | | | | 10 | NC | 18 | Ret | 17 | 18 | 15 | Ret | 1 |
| 31 | (Estonia) Sten Pentus | | | | | | | | | | | | | | | | 14 | 17 | 0 |
| 32 | (Italy) Paolo Maria Nocera | | | | | | | | | | Ret | 14 | Ret | 21 | | | | | 0 |
| 33 | (Germany) Julian Theobald | 15 | 15 | Ret | 21 | | | | | | | | | | | | | | 0 |
| 34 | (Russia) Sergey Afanasyev | | | | | | | | | | | | 17 | 23 | 19 | 19 | Ret | Ret | 0 |
| Pos | Driver | MNZ SPR (Italy) | MNZ FEA (Italy) | SPA SPR (Belgium) | SPA FEA (Belgium) | MON FEA (Monaco) | SIL SPR (United Kingdom) | SIL FEA (United Kingdom) | HUN SPR (Hungary) | HUN FEA (Hungary) | NÜR SPR (Germany) | NÜR FEA (Germany) | LMS SPR (France) | LMS FEA (France) | EST SPR (Portugal) | EST FEA (Portugal) | CAT SPR (Spain) | CAT FEA (Spain) | Points |

| Colour | Result |
|---|---|
| Gold | Winner |
| Silver | Second place |
| Bronze | Third place |
| Green | Points classification |
| Blue | Non-points classification |
| Blue | Non-classified finish (NC) |
| Purple | Retired, not classified (Ret) |
| Red | Did not qualify (DNQ) |
| Red | Did not pre-qualify (DNPQ) |
| Black | Disqualified (DSQ) |
| White | Did not start (DNS) |
| White | Withdrew (WD) |
| White | Race cancelled (C) |
| Blank | Did not practice (DNP) |
| Blank | Did not arrive (DNA) |
| Blank | Excluded (EX) |

- Polesitter for feature race in **bold**
- Driver in italics has been awarded two points for fastest lap
- † — Drivers did not finish the race, but were classified as they completed over 90% of the race distance.

=== Teams' Championship ===
| Pos | Team | Car No. | MNZ SPR (Italy) | MNZ FEA (Italy) | SPA SPR (Belgium) | SPA FEA (Belgium) | MON FEA (Monaco) | SIL SPR (United Kingdom) | SIL FEA (United Kingdom) | HUN SPR (Hungary) | HUN FEA (Hungary) | NÜR SPR (Germany) | NÜR FEA (Germany) | LMS SPR (France) | LMS FEA (France) | EST SPR (Portugal) | EST FEA (Portugal) | CAT SPR (Spain) | CAT FEA (Spain) | Points |
|---|---|---|---|---|---|---|---|---|---|---|---|---|---|---|---|---|---|---|---|---|
| 1 | (France) Tech 1 Racing | 1 | 3 | 4 | Ret | Ret | 4 | 7 | 10 | 2 | 2 | Ret | 2 | 9 | 15 | 4 | 3 | 1 | 5 | 175 |
| 1 | (France) Tech 1 Racing | 2 | 9 | 3 | Ret | 12 | **1** | 15 | 13 | **18**† | 9 | Ret | 12 | 1 | 6 | Ret | 2 | 8 | 8 | 175 |
| 2 | (France) Ultimate Signature | 27 | DSQ | Ret | 15 | Ret | 12 | 4 | 5 | 3 | **1** | 1 | 6 | 3 | 2 | 1 | Ret | 5 | 10 | 159 |
| 2 | (France) Ultimate Signature | 28 | 16 | Ret | 12 | 19 | 17 | 22 | 4 | Ret | 12 | 12 | 9 | 4 | **3** | 5 | 6 | Ret | **1** | 159 |
| 3 | (United Kingdom) P1 Motorsport | 21 | 1 | **1** | Ret | 1 | 2 | 5 | 2 | 1 | 21† | 2 | **7** | DNS | 1 | 8 | 8 | DNS | Ret | 142 |
| 3 | (United Kingdom) P1 Motorsport | 22 | 10 | 11 | 16 | Ret | 18 | 19 | 20 | 15 | Ret | 7 | 19 | Ret | Ret | Ret | 15 | 13 | 13 | 142 |
| 4 | (Italy) Prema Powerteam | 9 | Ret | Ret | **9** | 6 | 9 | 23 | Ret | Ret | 3 | Ret | 1 | **2** | 5 | 7 | **1** | Ret | 7 | 137 |
| 4 | (Italy) Prema Powerteam | 10 | Ret | 2 | DNS | 10 | 14 | **3** | 8 | Ret | 5 | Ret | 3 | NC | 12 | 2 | Ret | 6 | Ret | 137 |
| 5 | (United Kingdom) Carlin Motorsport | 5 | 5 | 5 | 5 | 3 | 6 | Ret | 18 | 9 | 15 | 3 | DNS | 6 | 4 | 9 | 23 | 2 | 14 | 128 |
| 5 | (United Kingdom) Carlin Motorsport | 6 | Ret | Ret | 14 | Ret | 19 | 9 | **1** | Ret | 8 | 13 | 18 | 14 | 22 | 3 | 12 | 3 | 3 | 128 |
| 6 | (Italy) International DracoRacing | 3 | **Ret** | Ret | 1 | 11 | 5 | 6 | 16 | 4 | 4 | 5 | 5 | Ret | 16 | Ret | 4 | Ret | 4 | 93 |
| 6 | (Italy) International DracoRacing | 4 | 12 | 8 | Ret | 20 | 24† | 12 | 7 | 10 | 7 | Ret | 10 | 10 | 8 | 6 | 10 | 16 | Ret | 93 |
| 7 | (Austria) Interwetten.com | 19 | Ret | 14 | 2 | 4 | 16 | 1 | 3 | Ret | 16 | 4 | DSQ | 7 | 7 | 16 | 22 | Ret | 12 | 79 |
| 7 | (Austria) Interwetten.com | 20 | 4 | Ret | 8 | Ret | 21 | 21 | 24 | 8 | Ret | 6 | 8 | Ret | 17 | 13 | 21 | 12 | Ret | 79 |
| 8 | (United Kingdom) Red Devil Team Comtec | 25 | Ret | DSQ | 4 | **2** | 13 | 8 | 9 | 5 | 13 | Ret | 4 | 5 | 11 | **Ret** | 5 | Ret | DNS | 72 |
| 8 | (United Kingdom) Red Devil Team Comtec | 26 | 2 | 10 | 13 | 8 | 25† | 11 | 14 | 11 | 11 | Ret | 15 | 12 | 14 | | | 14 | 17 | 72 |
| 9 | (United Kingdom) Fortec Motorsport | 23 | 7 | 7 | Ret | 16 | 8 | 10 | 12 | 7 | 10 | Ret | 13 | Ret | 9 | Ret | 14 | 7 | 2 | 53 |
| 9 | (United Kingdom) Fortec Motorsport | 24 | 15 | 15 | Ret | 21 | 3 | Ret | 15 | 12 | 14 | **DSQ** | Ret | 13 | 19 | 12 | 20 | **Ret** | 6 | 53 |
| 10 | (Spain) Epsilon Euskadi | 7 | Ret | 12 | 10 | 17 | 23† | 18 | 19 | Ret | Ret | 9 | Ret | Ret | 18 | 10 | 9 | 4 | 9 | 32 |
| 10 | (Spain) Epsilon Euskadi | 8 | 14 | Ret | 6 | 7 | 20 | 17 | 25 | 17 | 6 | Ret | 16 | 11 | 10 | 20 | 16 | 9 | 15 | 32 |
| 11 | (Spain) Pons Racing | 14 | 17 | 16 | 7 | 13 | 10 | 14 | 17 | Ret | 18 | Ret | Ret | 8 | 13 | 15 | 13 | 11 | 11 | 29 |
| 11 | (Spain) Pons Racing | 15 | Ret | Ret | Ret | 9 | 15 | 2 | 6 | 13 | Ret | 11 | 11 | 15 | 24 | 11 | 7 | Ret | Ret | 29 |
| 12 | (Belgium) KTR | 16 | 13 | 13 | 11 | 5 | 22 | 24† | 23 | 16 | 20 | 10 | NC | 18 | Ret | 17 | 18 | 15 | Ret | 27 |
| 12 | (Belgium) KTR | 17 | 8 | 6 | 3 | 14 | 7 | 13 | 11 | Ret | Ret | | | 17 | 23 | 19 | 19 | Ret | Ret | 27 |
| 13 | (Italy) RC Motorsport | 11 | 11 | 9 | Ret | 18 | Ret | 20 | 22 | 14 | 17 | 8 | 17 | 16 | 20 | 18 | 17 | Ret | 16 | 16 |
| 13 | (Italy) RC Motorsport | 12 | 6 | Ret | Ret | 15 | 11 | 16 | 21 | 6 | 19 | Ret | 14 | Ret | 21 | 14 | 11 | 10 | Ret | 16 |
| Pos | Team | Car No. | MNZ SPR (Italy) | MNZ FEA (Italy) | SPA SPR (Belgium) | SPA FEA (Belgium) | MON FEA (Monaco) | SIL SPR (United Kingdom) | SIL FEA (United Kingdom) | HUN SPR (Hungary) | HUN FEA (Hungary) | NÜR SPR (Germany) | NÜR FEA (Germany) | LMS SPR (France) | LMS FEA (France) | EST SPR (Portugal) | EST FEA (Portugal) | CAT SPR (Spain) | CAT FEA (Spain) | Points |

| Colour | Result |
|---|---|
| Gold | Winner |
| Silver | Second place |
| Bronze | Third place |
| Green | Points classification |
| Blue | Non-points classification |
| Blue | Non-classified finish (NC) |
| Purple | Retired, not classified (Ret) |
| Red | Did not qualify (DNQ) |
| Red | Did not pre-qualify (DNPQ) |
| Black | Disqualified (DSQ) |
| White | Did not start (DNS) |
| White | Withdrew (WD) |
| White | Race cancelled (C) |
| Blank | Did not practice (DNP) |
| Blank | Did not arrive (DNA) |
| Blank | Excluded (EX) |
