= SG Formula =

French racing team

(France) SG Formula
- Founded: 2004
- Team principal(s): Stephane Guerin
- Current series: Formula Renault WEC
- Former series: World Series by Renault; Formula Renault Eurocup; Formula Renault France; Formula 3 Euro Series
- Teams' Championships: FRenault France 2005, 2006, 2007; FRenault Eurocup 2005, 2007, 2008; Formula Renault WEC 2008
- Drivers' Championships: FRenault France 2005 (Grosjean); FRenault France 2007 (Bianchi); Formula Renault WEC 2008 (Ricciardo)

SG Formula is a French auto racing team which participated in the junior categories of open wheel racing: Formula Renault and Formula Three. The team was founded in 2004 by Frenchman Stephane Guerin.

== History ==
After its foundation in 2004, SG Formula began racing in a number of Formula Renault championships with their drivers Yann Clairay, Guillaume Moreau and Romain Grosjean, with the team's concentrating mostly on the French championship with a handful of participations in the European and Swiss championships. The team enjoyed some success in its inaugural year of motorsport with Clairay and Moreau finishing second and third respectively in the French Drivers' Championship and Grosjean finished as runner-up rookie. The team finished second in that year's Team's Championship with 649 points; 27 points off champions Graff Racing. Wins were also present in SG Formula's other championships, including a win for Clairay at Magny-Cours in the European series and a win in the single entry they had in the Swiss championship.

2005 spread their wings into a number of other championships: While still remaining in the French and European series, with intentions to run a full championship campaign in both, they entered a selected number of events in the Dutch championship while dropping their involvement in the Swiss series. The team retained its drivers, bar Moreau who had moved to fellow French team Signature-Plus; Carlo van Dam, Johan Charpilienne and Julien Jousse were added at the team's roster. The team enjoyed far more success than the previous year, with Grosjean winning the Drivers' Championship in France and the team picked up the Team's Championship in the Eurocup as well as in the French series. The Dutchman van Dam also managed to score three podiums in the Dutch championship as well. At the end of the year, after partnering with Dyna Ten Motorsport, the team entered a Support Race for the Macau Grand Prix where the team finished twelfth and thirteenth.

Like Moreau before him, Grosjean jumped ship to Signature-Plus for a campaign in Formula Three, which is what SG Formula could not offer the French driver at the time. Clairay also entered a limited number of races for the team as he was concentrating on his Le Mans Series campaign with Paul Belmondo Racing; Charpilienne also left the team at the end of 2005. Van Dam and Jousse stayed with SG Formula for 2006 with Red Bull-backed Tom Dillmann joining the Dutch driver for the Eurocup team and rookie Jean Karl Vernay joining Jousse for the French championship. The two entries did well in their respective championships, with the Eurocup team finishing second in the Team's Championship, with Van Dam finishing third in the Drivers' Championship, and Vernay finished the year as both runner-up in the Drivers' and Rookie championship in the French Championship with a Team Championship for a second year in a row as well.

The team ran two Eurocup teams in 2007 named SG Formula and SG Driver's Project and hired a number of new drivers to their roster. Brit Jon Lancaster finished the season as runner-up to New Zealander Brendon Hartley with Charles Pic finishing behind him in third. The team also claimed that year's Team title in the Eurocup. In the French championship, incidentally the last championship before the series became the West European Cup, the team enjoyed their best season with Jules Bianchi taking home the Drivers' Title and the team won the Team's championship for the third year in succession.

SG Formula stepped up to Formula Three in 2008 by entering a team for the Formula Three Euroseries with a three-man team of former driver Clairay, Dutch driver Henkie Waldschmidt and Tom Dillmann, and ended up 6th in the teams' championship – mainly thanks to Clairay's solid finishing – which led him to 9th overall.

The team will return in 2009, with Lancaster returning to the team along with Waldschmidt, with Andrea Caldarelli moving up from the Eurocup.

At the beginning of 2010, the team withdrew from the Formula Renault 3.5 Series, Formula Three Euroseries and Eurocup Formula Renault 2.0.

== Complete motor racing results ==
=== Formula Renault ===
Formula Renault
Year	Championship	Drivers	Wins	Poles	Fast laps	Points	D.C.	T.C. (Points)
2004	Formula Renault France	(France) Yann Clairay	2	1	1	264	2nd	2nd
2004	Formula Renault France	(France) Guillaume Moreau	3	4	4	227	3rd	2nd
2004	Formula Renault France	(France) Romain Grosjean	1	2	1	130	7th	2nd
2004	Formula Renault Eurocup	(France) Yann Clairay	1	1	0	82	10th	4th
2004	Formula Renault Eurocup	(France) Guillaume Moreau	0	1	1	148	7th	4th
2005	Formula Renault France	(France) Romain Grosjean	10	20	11	211	1st	1st
2005	Formula Renault France	(France) Johan Charpilienne	1	0	1	100	4th	1st
2005	Formula Renault France	(France) Franck Mailleux	1	0	0	81	5th	1st
2005	Formula Renault France	(France) Julien Jousse	1	1	0	70	6th	1st
2005	Formula Renault Eurocup	(France) Yann Clairay	3	5	1	125	3rd	1st
2005	Formula Renault Eurocup	(Netherlands) Carlo van Dam	0	0	0	100	4th	1st
2005	Formula Renault Netherlands	(France) Yann Clairay	0	0	0	37	15th	?
2005	Formula Renault Netherlands	(Netherlands) Carlo van Dam	0	0	0	74	7th	?
2006	Formula Renault France	(France) Jean-Karl Vernay	2	3	3	108	2nd	1st
2006	Formula Renault France	(France) Julien Jousse	1	1	2	89	3rd	1st
2006	Formula Renault Eurocup	(Netherlands) Carlo van Dam	1	2	1	90	3rd	2nd
2006	Formula Renault Eurocup	(France) Tom Dillmann	0	0	2	61	8th	2nd
2007	Formula Renault France	(France) Nelson Panciatici	0	0	0	19	14th	1st
2007	Formula Renault France	(France) Charles Pic	0	1	0	69	4th	1st
2007	Formula Renault France	(United Kingdom) Jon Lancaster	2	1	1	64	6th	1st
2007	Formula Renault France	(France) Alexandre Marsoin	2	0	1	84	3rd	1st
2007	Formula Renault France	(France) Edouard Texte	0	0	0	8	16th	1st
2007	Formula Renault France	(France) Jules Bianchi	5	5	10	172	1st	1st
2007	Formula Renault Eurocup	(France) Nelson Panciatici	0	0	0	44	10th	1st
2007	Formula Renault Eurocup	(France) Edouard Texte	0	0	0	0	—	1st
2007	Formula Renault Eurocup	(Italy) Fabio Onidi	0	0	0	6	20th	1st
2007	Formula Renault Eurocup	(France) Charles Pic	1	2	1	88	3rd	1st
2007	Formula Renault Eurocup	(France) Jules Bianchi	0	1	1	4	21st	1st
2007	Formula Renault Eurocup	(United Kingdom) Jon Lancaster	5	4	3	102	2nd	1st
2007	Formula Renault Eurocup	(France) Alexandre Marsoin	0	0	0	25	14th	1st
2007	Formula Renault Eurocup	(Russia) Anton Nebylitskiy	0	0	0	0	—	1st
2008	Formula Renault Eurocup	(United Arab Emirates) Ramez Azzam	0	0	0	0	37th	1st
2008	Formula Renault Eurocup	(Russia) Anton Nebylitskiy	0	0	0	7	20th	1st
2008	Formula Renault Eurocup	(France) Jean-Éric Vergne	0	0	0	53	6th	1st
2008	Formula Renault Eurocup	(Australia) Daniel Ricciardo	6	5	6	136	2nd	1st
2008	Formula Renault Eurocup	(Italy) Andrea Caldarelli	0	0	0	123	3rd	1st
2008	Formula Renault Eurocup	(France) Nelson Lukes	0	0	0	0	54th	1st
2008	Formula Renault Eurocup	(United Kingdom) Alexander Sims	0	0	0	7	19th	1st
2008	Formula Renault Eurocup	(Spain) Miquel Monrás	0	0	0	6	21st	1st
2008	Formula Renault WEC	(United Arab Emirates) Ramez Azzam	0	0	0	5	22nd	1st
2008	Formula Renault WEC	(Russia) Anton Nebylitskiy	0	0	0	41	7th	1st
2008	Formula Renault WEC	(France) Jean-Éric Vergne	0	0	0	95	4th	1st
2008	Formula Renault WEC	(Australia) Daniel Ricciardo	8	9	7	192	1st	1st
2008	Formula Renault WEC	(Italy) Andrea Caldarelli	3	0	1	129	3rd	1st
2008	Formula Renault WEC	(France) Tristan Vautier	0	0	0	79	6th	1st

- D.C. = Drivers' Championship position, T.C. = Teams' Championship position.

=== Formula Three ===
Formula Three
Year	Championship	Drivers	Wins	Poles	Fast laps	Points	D.C.	T.C. (Points)
2008	Formula Three Euroseries	(France) Tom Dillmann	0	0	0	8	18th	6th
2008	Formula Three Euroseries	(Netherlands) Henkie Waldschmidt	0	0	0	0	26th	6th
2008	Formula Three Euroseries	(France) Yann Clairay	0	0	1	33	9th	6th
2008	Formula Three Euroseries	(Australia) Daniel Ricciardo	0	0	0	0	—†	6th
2009	Formula Three Euroseries	(United Kingdom) Jon Lancaster	0	0	0	0	—	6th
2009	Formula Three Euroseries	(Netherlands) Henkie Waldschmidt	0	0	0	13	12th	6th
2009	Formula Three Euroseries	(Italy) Andrea Caldarelli	0	0	1	11	14th	6th

† - Ricciardo was ineligible to score points.
* - Season still in progress

D.C. = Drivers' Championship position, T.C. = Teams' Championship position.

Achievements
Preceded by Motopark Academy	Eurocup Formula Renault 2.0 Teams' Champion; 2005	Succeeded by JD Motorsport
Preceded by Epsilon Euskadi	Eurocup Formula Renault 2.0 Teams' Champion; 2008	Succeeded by Epsilon Euskadi
