= Formula Renault Eurocup =

Former Single-Seater Racing Championship

- Category: Formula Renault 2.0 (1991–2018); Regional Formula 3 (2019–2020)
- Inaugural season: 1991
- Folded: 2020
- Constructors: Renault
- Engine suppliers: Renault
- Tyre suppliers: Hankook
- Last Drivers' champion: (France) Victor Martins
- Last Teams' champion: (France) ART Grand Prix
- Official website: www.renaultsport.com

Formula Renault Eurocup was a Formula Renault motor racing championship. Eurocup raced only on European circuits.

It served as a support series to the Formula Renault 3.5 Series as part of the World Series by Renault from 2005 to 2015. Renault Sport offered a prize of €500,000 to the winner of the Eurocup until 2015. Following the 2020 season, the Formula Renault Eurocup merged with the Formula Regional European Championship due to COVID-19 pandemic.

== History ==
The series was established in 1991, as the "Rencontres Internationales de Formule Renault", before switching to the "Eurocup Formula Renault" name in 1993.

In 2000, renamed to Formula Renault 2000 Eurocup and Eurocup Formula Renault 2.0 since 2005 used up to now, excludes the 2003 season named Formula Renault 2000 Masters.

While a support series of the Formula Renault 3.5 many drivers stepped up to the senior category, for example the 2006 champion Filipe Albuquerque, fourth-place finisher Bertrand Baguette and 13th-place finisher Xavier Maassen being the first to do so that on the full-time basis for the 2007 season. 2007 champion Brendon Hartley did not follow suit however, and instead moved firstly to British Formula Three Championship. Meanwhile, Charles Pic and Alexandre Marsoin joined FR 3.5 for the 2008. 2008 champion Valtteri Bottas moved to the Formula 3 Euro Series, and only Anton Nebylitskiy who was placed 20th, made his debut in FR 3.5 in 2009. 2009 was the first season when the champion received money to graduate to FR 3.5 and Albert Costa used this opportunity. He was joined in the 2010 Formula Renault 3.5 Series season by sixth-place finisher Nathanaël Berthon. Like Costa, 2010 champion Kevin Korjus and his rivals Arthur Pic, Daniël de Jong and André Negrão moved to FR 3.5 in 2011. 2011 champion Robin Frijns not only graduated to FR 3.5 in 2012, he also became the first driver, who won both Eurocup and FR 3.5 Series consecutively. Other 2011 Eurocup graduates, who moved to FR 3.5 were Will Stevens and Vittorio Ghirelli. 2012 champion Stoffel Vandoorne and his contender Norman Nato headed to FR 3.5 in 2013. Pierre Gasly and Oliver Rowland, who fought till the last race for the 2013 Eurocup title, both graduated to FR 3.5 in 2014. They was joined by Luca Ghiotto, Matthieu Vaxivière and Roman Mavlanov. Nyck de Vries dominated the 2014 championship and moved to FR 3.5 in 2015. Egor Orudzhev, Aurélien Panis and Gustav Malja moved to Formula Renault 3.5 as well.

== Car specifications ==
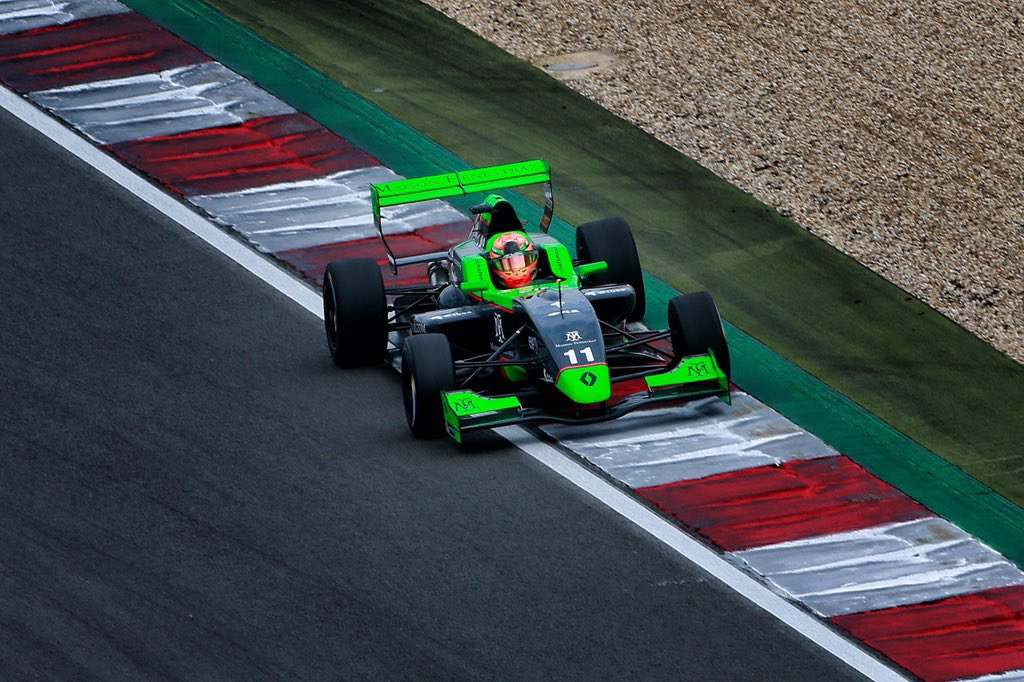
Sacha Fenestraz in 2017.

The chassis was built at Alpine's Dieppe plant, a Renault subsidiary. The aerodynamic kit was designed by Tatuus. All Eurocup Formula Renault 2.0 cars use the same specifications.

- Chassis: FR2.0/13. Carbon-fibre bodywork
- Engine: Renault F4R 832 – 4-cylinder – 16 valve – 1998cc. 210 bhp at 7,500rpm. 220Nm at 5,500rpm
- Transmission: SADEV seven-speed sequential + reverse gear. XAP electric control gearshift, semi-automatic steering-wheel mounted
- Front suspension: ZF Race Engineering single damper, two-way adjustable
- Rear suspension: ZF Race Engineering double damper, two-way adjustable
- Brakes: Four-piston calipers with 278 x 18 mm steel discs
- Rims: Aluminium one-piece 9 x 13 (front) and 10 x 13 (rear)
- Tyres: Michelin 20-54 x 13 (front) and 24-57 x 13 (rear)
- Length/width/height: 4270 / 1740 / 950mm
- Front and rear track: 1502 / 1440mm
- Fuel tank: 50 litres
- Unloaded weight: 506 kg

== Champions ==
=== Prior Formula Renault Eurocup ===
Rencontres Internationales de Formule Renault
Season	Champion	Team
1991	(United Kingdom) Jason Plato	(United Kingdom) Duckhams Van Diemen
1992	(Spain) Pedro de la Rosa	Racing for Spain

Eurocup Formula Renault
Season	Champion	Team
1993	(France) Olivier Couvreur	(France) Synergie
1994	(United Kingdom) James Matthews	(United Kingdom) Manor Motorsport
1995	(France) Cyrille Sauvage	(France) Mygale
1996	(Brazil) Enrique Bernoldi	(Italy) Tatuus JD Motorsport
1997	(Belgium) Jeffrey van Hooydonk	(Italy) Tatuus JD Motorsport
1998	(France) Bruno Besson	(Italy) Tatuus JD Motorsport
1999	(Italy) Gianmaria Bruni	(Italy) JD Motorsport

Formula Renault 2000 Eurocup
Season	Champion	Team Champion
2000	(Brazil) Felipe Massa	(Italy) JD Motorsport
2001	(Brazil) Augusto Farfus	(Italy) RC Motorsport
2002	(France) Eric Salignon	(France) Graff Racing
2004	(United States) Scott Speed	(Germany) Motopark Academy

Formula Renault 2000 Masters
Season	Champion	Team Champion
2003	(Argentina) Esteban Guerrieri	(Italy) JD Motorsport

Eurocup Formula Renault 2.0
Season	Champion	Team Champion	Secondary Class Champion
2005	(Japan) Kamui Kobayashi	(France) SG Formula	not awarded
2006	(Portugal) Filipe Albuquerque	(Italy) JD Motorsport	not awarded
2007	(New Zealand) Brendon Hartley	(Spain) Epsilon RedBull	J: (New Zealand) Brendon Hartley
2008	(Finland) Valtteri Bottas	(France) SG Formula	J: (Italy) Andrea Caldarelli
2009	(Spain) Albert Costa	(Spain) Epsilon Euskadi	J: (Portugal) António Félix da Costa
2010	(Estonia) Kevin Korjus	(France) Tech 1 Racing	J: (Estonia) Kevin Korjus
2011	(Netherlands) Robin Frijns	(Finland) Koiranen Motorsport	J: (Spain) Carlos Sainz Jr.
2012	(Belgium) Stoffel Vandoorne	(Germany) Josef Kaufmann Racing	J: (Russia) Daniil Kvyat
2013	(France) Pierre Gasly	(France) Tech 1 Racing	J: (France) Pierre Gasly
2014	(Netherlands) Nyck de Vries	(Finland) Koiranen GP	J: (Norway) Dennis Olsen
2015	(United Kingdom) Jack Aitken	(Germany) Josef Kaufmann Racing	R: (United Kingdom) Harrison Scott
2016	(United Kingdom) Lando Norris	(Germany) Josef Kaufmann Racing	R: (United Kingdom) Lando Norris

=== Formula Renault Eurocup ===
Season	Champion	Team Champion	Secondary Class Champion
2017	(France) Sacha Fenestraz	(France) R-ace GP	R: (United Kingdom) Max Fewtrell
2018	(United Kingdom) Max Fewtrell	(France) R-ace GP	R: (Denmark) Christian Lundgaard
2019	(Australia) Oscar Piastri (Note: Oscar Piastri is an Australian racing driver, despite being listed as Australian in entry list he raced under British racing license, with British flag raised above the podium and British anthem played after his wins.)	(France) R-ace GP	R: (Brazil) Caio Collet
2020	(France) Victor Martins	(France) ART Grand Prix	R: (United Kingdom) Alex Quinn
