= 2010 Formula 3 Euro Series =

The 2010 Formula 3 Euro Series season was the eighth championship year of the Formula 3 Euro Series. It began on 10 April at Circuit Paul Ricard and finished on 17 October at Hockenheim after eighteen races at nine meetings. Grids for the 2010 season were substantially down on the previous season; with a maximum of sixteen drivers taking part in any of the season's meetings, after teams Manor Motorsport, SG Formula, Carlin Motorsport, HBR Motorsport and Kolles & Heinz Union all pulled out to focus on other series.

On track, series veteran Edoardo Mortara returned to the formulae after a season competing for Arden International, and with seven victories – all coming in the Saturday, higher points-awarding races – during the season, Mortara took the championship at the wheel of his Signature-run Dallara-Volkswagen, giving Volkswagen their first Euro Series championship. Second place was not resolved until the final round, as Mortara's teammate Marco Wittmann and ART Grand Prix's Valtteri Bottas battled over the placing. Bottas had to win the final race to deny Wittmann of second place, but could only finish third and thus Wittmann completed the Signature 1–2, taking a single victory during the season at the first Hockenheim meeting. Bottas finished third for the second consecutive season, after his first two Euro Series wins – although he had previously won two successive Masters of Formula 3 events at Zandvoort, which is a non-championship race – at the Norisring and Oschersleben.

Bottas' teammate Alexander Sims also matched his final 2009 placing, taking fourth place with one victory once again, winning the opening sprint race of the season at Paul Ricard but took four further podium finishes to confirm fourth. Mücke Motorsport's Roberto Merhi completed the top five, taking his first Euro Series win in the first Hockenheim sprint race. Other sprint race victories included four for the Motopark Academy squad, including three successive for top rookie finisher – seventh in the championship – António Félix da Costa who won at the Nürburgring, Zandvoort and Brands Hatch having started each from the front row due to the series' reverse-grid system for the top eight finishers from the previous day's race. Kevin Magnussen, on a one-off outing from his usual commitments in the German Formula Three championship, also claimed a sprint race victory for Motopark at Valencia. Daniel Juncadella won the final race of the season at Hockenheim, while Jim Pla, ART's third driver, took the other victory at Oschersleben. Signature's 1–2 championship finish allowed the team to claim their respective championship, while the Nations Cup was won by Italy through Mortara.

== Prize tests ==
The top drivers in the championship standings at the end of the year were rewarded with a wide range of prize tests in various other racing categories. The top three drivers – Mortara, Wittmann and Bottas – all received a Formula Renault 3.5 Series test.

As well as that, Mortara received a Deutsche Tourenwagen Masters test in the Audi A4, as he finished as top Volkswagen-engined driver as champion. Bottas, as top Mercedes-Benz driver received a test in the Mercedes-Benz C-Class.

== Drivers and teams ==
2010 Entry List
Team	No	Driver	Rookie	Chassis (Note: All drivers competed in Dallara chassis; model listed.)	Engine	Rounds
(France) ART Grand Prix	1	(Finland) Valtteri Bottas		F308/026	Mercedes	All
(France) ART Grand Prix	2	(United Kingdom) Alexander Sims		F308/048	Mercedes	All
(France) ART Grand Prix	11	(France) Jim Pla	R	F308/070	Mercedes	All
(France) ART Grand Prix	30	(Mexico) Esteban Gutiérrez		F308/049	Mercedes	2
(Germany) Mücke Motorsport	3	(Spain) Roberto Merhi		F308/050	Mercedes	All
(Germany) Mücke Motorsport	4	(Colombia) Carlos Muñoz	R	F308/042	Mercedes	All
(France) Signature	5	(Italy) Edoardo Mortara		F309/023	Volkswagen	All
(France) Signature	6	(Germany) Marco Wittmann		F308/011	Volkswagen	All
(France) Signature	14	(Belgium) Laurens Vanthoor		F308/033	Volkswagen	All
(Italy) Prema Powerteam	7	(France) Nicolas Marroc		F308/047	Mercedes	All
(Italy) Prema Powerteam	8	(Spain) Daniel Juncadella	R	F309/014	Mercedes	All
(Germany) Motopark Academy	9	(United Kingdom) Adrian Quaife-Hobbs	R	F308/099	Volkswagen	1–2
(Germany) Motopark Academy	10	(Finland) Matias Laine	R	F308/096	Volkswagen	All
(Germany) Motopark Academy	13	(Portugal) António Félix da Costa	R	F308/098	Volkswagen	All
(Germany) Motopark Academy	15	(Denmark) Kevin Magnussen	R	F308/099	Volkswagen	3
(Germany) Motopark Academy	16	(Finland) Mika Mäki		F308/099	Volkswagen	5–7
(Germany) Motopark Academy	17	(Germany) Tobias Hegewald	R	F308/099	Volkswagen	8
(Germany) Motopark Academy	18	(Switzerland) Christopher Zanella		F308/099	Volkswagen	9
(Germany) Motopark Academy	33	(Switzerland) Christopher Zanella		F308/092	Volkswagen	5–7
(Germany) Motopark Academy	31	(Sweden) Jimmy Eriksson	R	F305/045	Volkswagen	2
(Germany) Motopark Academy	34	(Netherlands) Renger van der Zande		F308/092	Volkswagen	8
(Germany) China Sonangol-Motopark	32	(Angola) Luís Sá Silva	R	F305/004	Volkswagen	2
(Switzerland) Jo Zeller Racing	38	(Switzerland) Sandro Zeller	R	F306/014	Mercedes	2, 9

Icon	Legend
R	Rookie Cup

=== Driver changes ===
Changed Teams

- Mika Mäki: Signature → Motopark Academy
- Roberto Merhi: Manor Motorsport → Mücke Motorsport
- Edoardo Mortara: Kolles & Heinz Union → Signature
- Alexander Sims: ASL Mücke Motorsport → ART Grand Prix
- Marco Wittmann: ASL Mücke Motorsport → Signature

Entering/Re-Entering Formula 3 Euro Series

- António Félix da Costa: Eurocup Formula Renault 2.0 & Formula Renault 2.0 Northern European Cup (Motopark Academy) → Motopark Academy
- Jimmy Eriksson: Formula Renault 2.0 Northern European Cup (Motopark Academy) → Motopark Academy
- Tobias Hegewald: GP3 Series (RSC Mücke Motorsport) → Motopark Academy
- Daniel Juncadella: Formula BMW Europe (EuroInternational) → Prema Powerteam
- Matias Laine: Formula Renault UK (CRS Racing) → Motopark Academy
- Kevin Magnussen: Eurocup Formula Renault 2.0 & Formula Renault 2.0 Northern European Cup (Motopark Academy) → Motopark Academy
- Nicolas Marroc: German Formula Three Championship (Racing Experience) → Prema Powerteam
- Carlos Muñoz: Eurocup Formula Renault 2.0 & Formula Renault 2.0 West European Cup (Epsilon Euskadi) → Mücke Motorsport
- Jim Pla: Formula BMW Europe (DAMS) → ART Grand Prix
- Adrian Quaife-Hobbs: Eurocup Formula Renault 2.0 & Formula Renault 2.0 Northern European Cup (Motopark Academy) → Motopark Academy
- Luís Sá Silva: Asian Formula Renault Challenge (Asia Racing Team) → Motopark Academy
- Laurens Vanthoor: German Formula Three Championship (Van Amersfoort Racing) → Signature
- Sandro Zeller: Formula Lista Junior (Jo Zeller Racing) → Jo Zeller Racing

Leaving Formula 3 Euro Series

- Jules Bianchi: ART Grand Prix → GP2 Series (ART Grand Prix)
- Sam Bird: Mücke Motorsport → GP2 Series (ART Grand Prix)
- Mirko Bortolotti: Carlin Motorsport → GP3 Series (Addax Team)
- Andrea Caldarelli: SG Formula → Italian Formula Three Championship (Prema Powerteam)
- Johnny Cecotto Jr.: HBR Motorsport → GP2 Series (Trident Racing)
- Matteo Chinosi: Prema Powerteam → unknown
- Stefano Coletti: Prema Powerteam → Formula Renault 3.5 Series (Comtec Racing)
- Carlo van Dam: Kolles & Heinz Union & SG Formula → Le Mans Series (Atlas FX-Team Full Speed)
- Tom Dillmann: HBR Motorsport & Prema Powerteam → German Formula Three Championship (HS Technik)
- Pedro Enrique: Manor Motorsport → GP3 Series (ART Grand Prix)
- Victor García: Prema Powerteam → Formula Renault 3.5 Series (KMP Racing)
- Tiago Geronimi: Signature → unknown
- Brendon Hartley: Carlin Motorsport → Formula Renault 3.5 Series (Tech 1 Racing)
- Johan Jokinen: Kolles & Heinz Union → FIA Formula Two Championship
- Alexandre Marsoin: SG Formula → unknown
- Kevin Mirocha: HBR Motorsport → Eurocup Formula Renault 2.0 (SL Formula Racing)
- Nico Monien: Mücke Motorsport → German Formula Three Championship (URD Rennsport)
- Atte Mustonen: Motopark Academy → unknown
- César Ramos: Manor Motorsport → Italian Formula Three Championship (BVM – Target Racing)
- Jake Rosenzweig: Carlin Motorsport → Formula Renault 3.5 Series (Carlin)
- Tim Sandtler: Prema Powerteam → unknown
- Basil Shaaban: Prema Powerteam → unknown
- Adrien Tambay: ART Grand Prix → Auto GP (Charouz-Gravity Racing)
- Nick Tandy: Kolles & Heinz Union → Porsche Supercup (Konrad Motorsport)
- Jean-Karl Vernay: Signature → Firestone Indy Lights (Sam Schmidt Motorsports)
- Christian Vietoris: Mücke Motorsport → GP2 Series (Racing Engineering)
- Henkie Waldschmidt: SG Formula → unknown
- Robert Wickens: Kolles & Heinz Union → GP3 Series (Status Grand Prix)

=== Team changes ===
- Carlin Motorsport and Manor Motorsport left the series to participate in the new-for-2010 GP3 Series.
- SG Formula and Kolles & Heinz Union also left the series.
- Motopark Academy changed their engine supplier from Mercedes to Volkswagen.

== Race calendar and results ==
- A nine-round calendar was announced on 18 December 2009. The calendar was reduced to eight rounds on 29 January 2010 after the Euro Series decided to skip the Deutsche Tourenwagen Masters events at Lausitz and the second Hockenheim round. However, the series did add a season-closing round at Circuit de Nevers Magny-Cours. This was later removed, in place of a round at Paul Ricard in support of the Le Mans Series, with the second Hockenheim round returning.

Round		Circuit	Date	Pole position	Fastest lap	Winning driver	Winning team
1	R1	(France) Circuit Paul Ricard, Le Castellet	10 April	(Spain) Daniel Juncadella	(Germany) Marco Wittmann	(Italy) Edoardo Mortara	(France) Signature
1	R2	(France) Circuit Paul Ricard, Le Castellet	11 April		(Spain) Daniel Juncadella	(United Kingdom) Alexander Sims	(France) ART Grand Prix
2	R1	(Germany) Hockenheimring (GP Circuit)	24 April	(Germany) Marco Wittmann	(Italy) Edoardo Mortara	(Germany) Marco Wittmann	(France) Signature
2	R2	(Germany) Hockenheimring (GP Circuit)	25 April		(Finland) Valtteri Bottas	(Spain) Roberto Merhi	(Germany) Mücke Motorsport
3	R1	(Spain) Circuit Ricardo Tormo, Valencia	22 May	(Italy) Edoardo Mortara	(Spain) Daniel Juncadella	(Italy) Edoardo Mortara	(France) Signature
3	R2	(Spain) Circuit Ricardo Tormo, Valencia	23 May		(Denmark) Kevin Magnussen	(Denmark) Kevin Magnussen	(Germany) Motopark Academy
4	R1	(Germany) Norisring, Nuremberg	3 July	(Italy) Edoardo Mortara	(Italy) Edoardo Mortara	(Italy) Edoardo Mortara	(France) Signature
4	R2	(Germany) Norisring, Nuremberg	4 July		(Italy) Edoardo Mortara	(Finland) Valtteri Bottas	(France) ART Grand Prix
5	R1	(Germany) Nürburgring	7 August	(Italy) Edoardo Mortara	(Italy) Edoardo Mortara	(Italy) Edoardo Mortara	(France) Signature
5	R2	(Germany) Nürburgring	8 August		(Spain) Daniel Juncadella	(Portugal) António Félix da Costa	(Germany) Motopark Academy
6	R1	(Netherlands) Circuit Park Zandvoort	21 August	(Italy) Edoardo Mortara	(Italy) Edoardo Mortara	(Italy) Edoardo Mortara	(France) Signature
6	R2	(Netherlands) Circuit Park Zandvoort	22 August		(Italy) Edoardo Mortara	(Portugal) António Félix da Costa	(Germany) Motopark Academy
7	R1	(United Kingdom) Brands Hatch, Kent	4 September	(Belgium) Laurens Vanthoor	(Germany) Marco Wittmann	(Italy) Edoardo Mortara	(France) Signature
7	R2	(United Kingdom) Brands Hatch, Kent	5 September		(Portugal) António Félix da Costa	(Portugal) António Félix da Costa	(Germany) Motopark Academy
8	R1	(Germany) Motorsport Arena Oschersleben	18 September	(Finland) Valtteri Bottas	(Finland) Valtteri Bottas	(Finland) Valtteri Bottas	(France) ART Grand Prix
8	R2	(Germany) Motorsport Arena Oschersleben	19 September		(Finland) Valtteri Bottas	(France) Jim Pla	(France) ART Grand Prix
9	R1	(Germany) Hockenheimring (National Circuit)	16 October	(Italy) Edoardo Mortara	(Finland) Valtteri Bottas	(Italy) Edoardo Mortara	(France) Signature
9	R2	(Germany) Hockenheimring (National Circuit)	17 October		(Spain) Daniel Juncadella	(Spain) Daniel Juncadella	(Italy) Prema Powerteam

== Standings ==
=== Drivers ===
- Points are awarded as follows:

	1	2	3	4	5	6	7	8	PP
Race 1	10	8	6	5	4	3	2	1	**1**
Race 2	6	5	4	3	2	1	0		0

Pos	Driver	LEC (France)		HOC (Germany)		VAL (Spain)		NOR (Germany)		NÜR (Germany)		ZAN (Netherlands)		BRH (United Kingdom)		OSC (Germany)		HOC (Germany)		Pts
1	(Italy) Edoardo Mortara	1	2	2	3	**1**	6	**1**	3	**1**	6	**1**	11	1	Ret	6	Ret	**1**	DSQ	101
2	(Germany) Marco Wittmann	2	3	**1**	4	11	7	2	2	5	2	3	6	3	5	7	2	3	7	76
3	(Finland) Valtteri Bottas	9	6	3	5	2	4	3	1	6	7	2	Ret	4	4	**1**	11†	2	3	74
4	(United Kingdom) Alexander Sims	3	1	Ret	8	3	5	4	4	4	3	4	5	5	8	2	8	4	5	63
5	(Spain) Roberto Merhi	5	4	4	1	4	Ret	5	11	3	5	5	3	11	10	5	9	5	2	56
6	(Belgium) Laurens Vanthoor	Ret	5	Ret	Ret	5	3	9	5	2	11	7	2	**2**	7	13	4	6	DSQ	42
7	(Portugal) António Félix da Costa	8	8	7	9	6	Ret	7	Ret	7	1	8	1	8	1	3	Ret	9	4	40
8	(Spain) Daniel Juncadella	**4**	7	8	2	9	9	10†	6	12	10	Ret	9	6	3	4	6	8	1	35
9	(Colombia) Carlos Muñoz	Ret	12	14	Ret	10	Ret	6	9	14	9	6	4	7	2	8	10†	11	6	18
10	(France) Jim Pla	7	11	13	6	DNS	8	Ret	8	8	4	10	13	13	12	9	1	12	11†	13
11	(France) Nicolas Marroc	11	10	10	13†	8	2	11†	10	9	8	13	12	12	11	10	3	Ret	8	10
12	(Denmark) Kevin Magnussen					7	1													8
13	(United Kingdom) Adrian Quaife-Hobbs	6	9	5	7															7
14	(Finland) Matias Laine	10	13	9	10	Ret	10	8	7	11	Ret	12	10	10	6	11	Ret	10	9	3
15	(Switzerland) Christopher Zanella									10	Ret	9	7	DNS	DNS			7	Ret	2
16	(Germany) Tobias Hegewald															12	7			1
17	(Finland) Mika Mäki									13	Ret	11	8	9	9					0
Guest drivers ineligible for points
	(Netherlands) Renger van der Zande															14	5			0
	(Mexico) Esteban Gutiérrez			6	Ret															0
	(Switzerland) Sandro Zeller			15†	11													13	10	0
	(Sweden) Jimmy Eriksson			11	Ret															0
	(Angola) Luís Sá Silva			12	12															0
Pos	Driver	LEC (France)		HOC (Germany)		VAL (Spain)		NOR (Germany)		NÜR (Germany)		ZAN (Netherlands)		BRH (United Kingdom)		OSC (Germany)		HOC (Germany)		Pts

Colour	Result
Gold	Winner
Silver	Second place
Bronze	Third place
Green	Points classification
Blue	Non-points classification
Blue	Non-classified finish (NC)
Purple	Retired, not classified (Ret)
Red	Did not qualify (DNQ)
Red	Did not pre-qualify (DNPQ)
Black	Disqualified (DSQ)
White	Did not start (DNS)
White	Withdrew (WD)
White	Race cancelled (C)
Blank	Did not practice (DNP)
Blank	Did not arrive (DNA)
Blank	Excluded (EX)

**Bold** – Pole
Italics – Fastest Lap
**R** – Rookie Cup

† — Drivers did not finish the race, but were classified as they completed over 90% of the race distance.

=== Teams ===
Pos	Team	LEC (France)		HOC (Germany)		VAL (Spain)		NOR (Germany)		NÜR (Germany)		ZAN (Netherlands)		BRH (United Kingdom)		OSC (Germany)		HOC (Germany)		Pts
1	(France) Signature	1	2	1	3	1	3	1	2	1	2	1	2	1	5	5	2	1	7	193
1	(France) Signature	2	3	2	4	5	6	2	3	2	6	3	6	2	7	6	4	3	DSQ	193
2	(France) ART Grand Prix	3	1	3	5	2	4	3	1	4	3	2	5	4	4	1	1	2	3	148
2	(France) ART Grand Prix	7	6	13	6	3	5	4	4	6	4	4	13	5	8	2	8	4	5	148
3	(Germany) Mücke Motorsport	5	4	4	1	4	Ret	5	9	3	5	5	3	7	2	5	9	5	2	74
3	(Germany) Mücke Motorsport	Ret	12	14	Ret	10	Ret	6	11	14	9	6	4	11	10	8	10	11	6	74
4	(Germany) Motopark Academy	6	8	5	7	6	1	7	7	7	1	8	1	8	1	3	7	7	4	60
4	(Germany) Motopark Academy	8	9	7	9	7	10	8	Ret	10	Ret	11	8	9	6	11	Ret	9	9	60
5	(Italy) Prema Powerteam	4	7	8	2	8	2	10	6	9	8	13	9	6	3	4	3	8	1	44
5	(Italy) Prema Powerteam	11	10	10	13	9	9	11	10	12	10	Ret	12	12	11	10	6	Ret	8	44
Guest teams ineligible for points
	(Switzerland) Jo Zeller Racing			15	11													13	10	0
Pos	Team	LEC (France)		HOC (Germany)		VAL (Spain)		NOR (Germany)		NÜR (Germany)		ZAN (Netherlands)		BRH (United Kingdom)		OSC (Germany)		HOC (Germany)		Pts

=== Nations Cup ===
	Nation	Points
1	Italy	96
2	Spain	90
3	Germany	76
4	Finland	76
5	Great Britain	70
6	Belgium	41
7	Portugal	40
8	France	23
9	Colombia	18
10	Denmark	8
11	Switzerland	2
Guest nations
	Mexico	0
	Angola	0
	Sweden	0
	Netherlands	0

== See also ==
- 2010 British Formula 3 season
- 2010 German Formula Three season
- 2010 GP3 Series season
- 2010 Masters of Formula 3
