= Sergey Chukanov =

Ukrainian racing driver

- Nationality: Ukraine
- Born: 29 April 1988 (age 38) Dniprodzerzhynsk, Ukraine
- Categorisation: FIA Silver

Previous series
- 2015 2014 2013 2013 2008-2009 2007: Blancpain GT; European Le Mans Series; Ferrari Challenge Europe; Superstars GT; ATS Formel 3 Russian Formula 1600 Championship; Formula Renault NEC

Championship titles
- 2013 2009: Ferrari Challenge Europe - Trofeo Pirelli; ATS Formel 3 Trophy

Sergey Chukanov or Serhiy Chukanov (Ukrainian: Сергій Чуканов; born 29 April 1988) is a former Ukrainian racing driver. In 2013, he won the Ferrari Challenge Europe Trofeo Pirelli.

== Career ==
Chukanov competed in kart racing before graduating to single seaters in 2006 when he entered Formula Renault NEC with Lukoil Racing. In his first season, he scored 96 points and finished 15th in the championship. For 2007, he moved to Formula 1600 Russia, and then for 2008 & 2009 he moved to ATS Formel 3 Cup. In his second season, he won the trophy drivers championship series for Stromos Art-Line, winning 14 of the 18 races.

After a career break, Chukanov returned to racing in 2013 in the Superstars GT series. Driving a Ferrari 458 he won one of the two sprint races entered for Team Ukraine. That same year, he would drive in the Ferrari Challenge Europe, a series he would win for Ferrari Ukraina. Over the season he won three races and secured a further 3 podium finishes. In 2014, he drove one race in the European Le Mans Series at Silverstone, winning the GTC category. In 2015, he completed two races in the Blancpain GT and Endurance series but failed to finish either race.

== Racing Record ==
=== Career Summary ===
Season	Series	Team	Races	Wins	Poles	F/Laps	Podiums	Points	Position
2006	Formula Renault 2.0 Northern European Cup	Lukoil Racing	13	0	0	0	0	96	15th
2007	Russian Formula 1600 Championship	Lukoil Racing	?	?	?	?	?	141	3rd
2008	German Formula 3 Championship	Team Rhino's Leipert	18	0	0	0	0	8	13th
2009	German Formula 3 Championship	Stromos Art-Line	18	0	0	0	0	12	13th
2009	German Formula 3 Championship - Trophy	Stromos Art-Line	18	14	11	13	15	158	**1st**
2013	International GTSprint Series	Team Ukraine	2	1	1	1	2	45	20th
2013	Ferrari Challenge Europe - Trofeo Pirelli	Ferrari Ukraina	11	3	1	3	6	164	**1st**
2014	European Le Mans Series - GTC	Team Ukraine	1	1	0	0	1	25	10th
2015	Blancpain Endurance Series	Attempto Racing	1	0	0	0	0	0	NC
2015	Blancpain GT Sprint Series	Attempto Racing	1	0	0	0	0	0	NC

=== Complete Formula Renault 2.0 NEC results ===
(key) (Races in bold indicate pole position) (Races in italics indicate fastest lap)

Year	Entrant	1	2	3	4	5	6	7	8	9	10	11	12	13	14	15	16	DC	Points
2006	Lukoil Racing	OSC; 1; 16	OSC; 2 DNS	SPA; 1	SPA; 2	NÜR; 1; 17	NÜR; 2; 15	ZAN; 1 Ret	ZAN; 2; 12	OSC; 1 Ret	OSC; 2; 9	ASS; 1; 5	ASS; 2; 8	AND; 1 Ret	AND; 2; 20	SAL; 1; 9	SAL; 2; 10	16th	96
