= 2010 German Formula Three Championship =

Formula Three season

Seasons
- ← 2009 2011 →

The 2010 ATS F3 Cup was the eighth edition of the German F3 Cup. The season consisted of nine race weekends, totalling eighteen races, beginning on 10 April at Oschersleben and ending on 3 October at the same venue.

HS Technik driver Tom Dillmann became the first French driver to win the championship title after a title battle with Van Amersfoort Racing's Daniel Abt. Dillmann, who won six races during the season had held a seven-point championship lead into the final race over Abt, who won the opening race at Oschersleben to go with his other win at Assen, which meant that Abt had to finish in the top two placings to have a mathematical chance of overhauling Dillmann, but a broken lambda sensor eliminated Abt from challenging Dillmann. Also resolved at the final round was the battle for third place between Motopark Academy rookie and three-time race winner Kevin Magnussen and Abt's Van Amersfoort team-mate Stef Dusseldorp, who won races at Oschersleben and Assen. Magnussen had led Dusseldorp by two points with one race to run, but Dusseldorp lost the opportunity for third place after failing to start the final race; he stalled at the first start and was rammed from behind by Magnussen's team-mate Jimmy Eriksson and accident damage prevented from restarting. Despite finishing behind Abt in the overall championship, Magnussen's consistent finishing won him the rookie championship.

Felix Rosenqvist finished best of the rest for Performance Racing, winning two races at Assen along with six second-place finishes for a fifth place championship finish. Eriksson at EuroSpeedway Lausitz, the third Van Amersfoort car of Willi Steindl in the final Oschersleben race and Brandl Racing's Nico Monien in a one-off appearance at Hockenheim also won races during the season. In the secondary Trophy class, twelve class wins in sixteen races enabled Riccardo Brutschin to take a dominant championship win, as he finished 21 points clear of Aleksey Karachev, who took his only class win at the final race of the season in which Brutschin was absent as he competed in the Cup class. Aki Sandberg also won at Oschersleben as he finished third in class. Aleksi Tuukkanen and Daniel Aho both took two victories in part-seasons, while Formula Renault 3.5 Series champion Mikhail Aleshin made a guest appearance in the class at Oschersleben, taking two on-the-road victories but was ineligible for championship points.

== Teams and drivers ==
- Guest drivers are listed in italics.

Team	Chassis	Engine	No.	Driver	Status	Rounds
Cup Class
(Netherlands) Van Amersfoort Racing	Dallara F306/023	Volkswagen	1	(Netherlands) Stef Dusseldorp		All
(Netherlands) Van Amersfoort Racing	Dallara F306/038	Volkswagen	2	(Germany) Daniel Abt	R	All
(Netherlands) Van Amersfoort Racing	Dallara F305/046	Volkswagen	7	(Austria) Willi Steindl		All
(Sweden) Performance Racing	Dallara F305/041	Volkswagen	5	(Israel) Alon Day	R	All
(Sweden) Performance Racing	Dallara F305/051	Volkswagen	6	(Sweden) Felix Rosenqvist	R	All
(Switzerland) Jo Zeller Racing	Dallara F305/011	Mercedes	8	(Switzerland) Sandro Zeller	R	1–5, 7–9
(Switzerland) Jo Zeller Racing	Dallara F306/014	Mercedes	9	(Netherlands) Nigel Melker		9
(Austria) HS Technik	Dallara F305/037	Volkswagen	10	(France) Tom Dillmann		All
(Austria) HS Technik	Dallara F306/025	Volkswagen	11	(Austria) Kevin Friesacher	R	1
(Luxembourg) Racing Experience	Dallara F305/012	Mercedes	15	(Luxembourg) Gary Hauser		All
(Luxembourg) Racing Experience	Dallara F306/010	Mercedes	16	(Sweden) Philip Forsman		2
(Germany) Brandl Motorsport	Dallara F306/008	Mercedes	17	(Germany) Markus Pommer		All
(Germany) Brandl Motorsport	Dallara F305/030	Mercedes	18	(Denmark) Marco Sørensen	R	1–3, 8
(Germany) Brandl Motorsport	Dallara F305/030	Mercedes	18	(Austria) Bernd Herndlhofer		6–7, 9
(Germany) Motopark Academy	Dallara F306/034	Volkswagen	20	(Denmark) Kevin Magnussen	R	All
(Germany) Motopark Academy	Dallara F305/064	Volkswagen	21	(Brazil) Luís Felipe Derani	R	All
(Germany) Motopark Academy	Dallara F305/045	Volkswagen	22	(Sweden) Jimmy Eriksson	R	All
(Germany) Motopark Academy	Dallara F305/016	Volkswagen	23	(Austria) René Binder	R	All
(Germany) URD Rennsport	Dallara F306/027	Mercedes	24	(Austria) Klaus Bachler	R	9
(Germany) URD Rennsport	Dallara F306/027	Mercedes	25	(Germany) Nico Monien		3
(Germany) China Sonangol	Dallara F305/004	Volkswagen	26	(Angola) Luís Sá Silva	R	1–3
(Germany) Kleveros Racing	Dallara F305/004	Volkswagen	26	(Sweden) Kevin Kleveros	R	8
(Russia) Max Travin Racing Team	Dallara F305/004	OPC Challenge	30	(Russia) Nikolay Martsenko		All
(Georgia (country)) Stromos ArtLine	Dallara F305/033	OPC Challenge	33	(Germany) Riccardo Brutschin	R	9
Trophy Class
(Georgia (country)) Stromos ArtLine	ArtTech F24/007	OPC Challenge	50	(Finland) Aleksi Tuukkanen	R	1–4
(Georgia (country)) Stromos ArtLine	ArtTech F24/007	OPC Challenge	50	(Finland) Daniel Aho	R	5–7
(Georgia (country)) Stromos ArtLine	ArtTech F24/008	OPC Challenge	51	(Russia) Aleksey Karachev	R	All
(Georgia (country)) Stromos ArtLine	ArtTech F24/008	OPC Challenge	63	(Germany) Riccardo Brutschin	R	1–8
(Georgia (country)) Stromos ArtLine	ArtTech F24/009	OPC Challenge	63	(Russia) Mikhail Aleshin	R	9
(Germany) Rhino's Leipert Motorsport	Dallara F304/012	Opel	55	(Italy) Luca Iannaccone		All
(Russia) Max Travin Racing Team	Dallara F303/021	OPC Challenge	60	(Russia) Maxim Travin		All
(Finland) Sandberg Motorsport	Dallara F302/088	Opel	61	(Finland) Aki Sandberg		All

Icon	Status
R	Rookie

== Calendar ==
Championship was part of the ADAC Masters Weekend at the seven rounds with Nürburgring round in July supporting ADAC Truck Grand Prix and Assen round in August as part of the Rizla Racing Day. With the exception of two rounds at TT Circuit Assen, all rounds took place on German soil.

Round		Circuit	Date	Pole position	Fastest lap	Winning driver	Winning team	Secondary Class winner
1	R1	Motorsport Arena Oschersleben	10 April	(Germany) Daniel Abt	(Germany) Daniel Abt	(Denmark) Kevin Magnussen	(Germany) Motopark Academy	T: (Germany) Riccardo Brutschin; R: (Denmark) Kevin Magnussen
1	R2	Motorsport Arena Oschersleben	11 April	(France) Tom Dillmann	(France) Tom Dillmann	(Netherlands) Stef Dusseldorp	(Netherlands) Van Amersfoort Racing	T: (Finland) Aleksi Tuukkanen; R: (Denmark) Kevin Magnussen
2	R1	Sachsenring	8 May	(France) Tom Dillmann	(France) Tom Dillmann	(France) Tom Dillmann	(Austria) HS Technik	T: (Germany) Riccardo Brutschin; R: (Sweden) Felix Rosenqvist
2	R2	Sachsenring	9 May	(Netherlands) Stef Dusseldorp	(Netherlands) Stef Dusseldorp	(France) Tom Dillmann	(Austria) HS Technik	T: (Germany) Riccardo Brutschin; R: (Germany) Daniel Abt
3	R1	Hockenheimring	29 May	(Germany) Daniel Abt	(Germany) Daniel Abt	(Germany) Nico Monien	(Germany) URD Rennsport	T: (Finland) Aleksi Tuukkanen; R: (Denmark) Kevin Magnussen
3	R2	Hockenheimring	30 May	(France) Tom Dillmann	(France) Tom Dillmann	(France) Tom Dillmann	(Austria) HS Technik	T: (Germany) Riccardo Brutschin; R: (Germany) Daniel Abt
4	R1	TT Circuit Assen	17 July	(Germany) Daniel Abt	(France) Tom Dillmann	(Sweden) Felix Rosenqvist	(Sweden) Performance Racing	T: (Germany) Riccardo Brutschin; R: (Sweden) Felix Rosenqvist
4	R2	TT Circuit Assen	18 July	(Germany) Daniel Abt	(Germany) Daniel Abt	(Germany) Daniel Abt	(Netherlands) Van Amersfoort Racing	T: (Germany) Riccardo Brutschin; R: (Germany) Daniel Abt
5	R1	Nürburgring	24 July	(Germany) Daniel Abt	(France) Tom Dillmann	(France) Tom Dillmann	(Austria) HS Technik	T: (Germany) Riccardo Brutschin; R: (Sweden) Felix Rosenqvist
5	R2	Nürburgring	25 July	(France) Tom Dillmann	(France) Tom Dillmann	(France) Tom Dillmann	(Austria) HS Technik	T: (Germany) Riccardo Brutschin; R: (Sweden) Felix Rosenqvist
6	R1	TT Circuit Assen	7 August	(Netherlands) Stef Dusseldorp	(Netherlands) Stef Dusseldorp	(Netherlands) Stef Dusseldorp	(Netherlands) Van Amersfoort Racing	T: (Germany) Riccardo Brutschin; R: (Germany) Daniel Abt
6	R2	TT Circuit Assen	8 August	(Sweden) Felix Rosenqvist	(France) Tom Dillmann	(Sweden) Felix Rosenqvist	(Sweden) Performance Racing	T: (Finland) Daniel Aho; R: (Sweden) Felix Rosenqvist
7	R1	EuroSpeedway Lausitz	14 August	(Germany) Daniel Abt	(Netherlands) Stef Dusseldorp	(Denmark) Kevin Magnussen	(Germany) Motopark Academy	T: (Finland) Daniel Aho; R: (Denmark) Kevin Magnussen
7	R2	EuroSpeedway Lausitz	15 August	(France) Tom Dillmann	(Germany) Daniel Abt	(Sweden) Jimmy Eriksson	(Germany) Motopark Academy	T: (Germany) Riccardo Brutschin; R: (Sweden) Jimmy Eriksson
8	R1	Nürburgring	28 August	(Denmark) Marco Sørensen	(France) Tom Dillmann	(Denmark) Kevin Magnussen	(Germany) Motopark Academy	T: (Germany) Riccardo Brutschin; R: (Denmark) Kevin Magnussen
8	R2	Nürburgring	29 August	(France) Tom Dillmann	(France) Tom Dillmann	(France) Tom Dillmann	(Austria) HS Technik	T: (Germany) Riccardo Brutschin; R: (Germany) Daniel Abt
9	R1	Motorsport Arena Oschersleben	2 October	(Netherlands) Stef Dusseldorp	(Germany) Daniel Abt	(Germany) Daniel Abt	(Netherlands) Van Amersfoort Racing	T: (Finland) Aki Sandberg; R: (Germany) Daniel Abt
9	R2	Motorsport Arena Oschersleben	3 October	(France) Tom Dillmann	(France) Tom Dillmann	(Austria) Willi Steindl	(Netherlands) Van Amersfoort Racing	T: (Russia) Aleksey Karachev; R: (Sweden) Felix Rosenqvist

== Standings ==
=== Cup ===
- Points were awarded as follows:

1	2	3	4	5	6	7	8	PP	FL
10	8	6	5	4	3	2	1	1	1

=== Trophy ===
- Points were awarded as follows:

1	2	3	4	5	6	7	8
10	8	6	5	4	3	2	1

Pos	Driver	OSC1		SAC		HOC		ASS1		NÜR1		ASS2		LAU		NÜR2		OSC2		Pts
Cup Class
1	(France) Tom Dillmann	3	7	1	1	3	1	8	4	1	1	4	5	5	8	9	1	2	19†	120
2	(Germany) Daniel Abt	2	3	4	2	5	3	2	1	5	3	10	15	4	4	2	2	1	16†	112
3	(Denmark) Kevin Magnussen	1	2	5	3	2	5	7	5	Ret	7	2	4	1	9	1	5	4	3	96
4	(Netherlands) Stef Dusseldorp	4	1	3	17	Ret	2	3	3	Ret	4	1	Ret	3	6	4	3	3	DNS	88
5	(Sweden) Felix Rosenqvist	Ret	11	2	Ret	Ret	8	1	2	2	2	6	1	8	2	5	4	11	2	83
6	(Sweden) Jimmy Eriksson	8	4	Ret	6	6	7	10	11	7	9	3	9	2	1	Ret	6	Ret	DNS	43
7	(Austria) Willi Steindl	7	9	7	7	DNS	12	5	6	3	5	Ret	8	6	18†	7	8	7	1	43
8	(Germany) Markus Pommer	5	6	10	8	8	Ret	6	7	6	8	7	2	20†	3	11	13	6	7	40
9	(Israel) Alon Day	13	10	11	10	10	4	4	12	8	6	Ret	7	10	5	8	7	8	9	26
10	(Brazil) Luís Felipe Derani	16	8	9	9	4	6	Ret	10	Ret	11	5	12	7	DSQ	Ret	9	9	4	20
11	(Denmark) Marco Sørensen	20†	5	21	4	7	10									3	12			18
12	(Austria) René Binder	10	Ret	13	12	12	14	12	Ret	4	10	8	3	16†	16	Ret	16	Ret	13	12
13	(Luxembourg) Gary Hauser	6	Ret	6	5	Ret	15	9	9	11	17	12	10	9	7	10	DNS	15	DNS	12
14	(Germany) Nico Monien					1	16													10
15	(Austria) Klaus Bachler																	5	5	8
16	(Austria) Bernd Herndlhofer											9	6	12	Ret			10	DNS	3
17	(Switzerland) Sandro Zeller	14	Ret	20	Ret	11	Ret	14	8	14	13			14	12	16	11	16	8	3
18	(Russia) Nikolay Martsenko	11	Ret	8	11	9	11	11	Ret	10	12	11	11	11	11	12	10	13	10	1
19	(Angola) Luís Sá Silva	12	Ret	14	19	DNS	9													0
20	(Austria) Kevin Friesacher	9	12																	0
21	(Germany) Riccardo Brutschin																	12	12	0
22	(Sweden) Philip Forsman			12	13															0
Guest drivers ineligible for points
	(Sweden) Kevin Kleveros															6	15			0
	(Netherlands) Nigel Melker																	21	6	0
Trophy Class
1	(Germany) Riccardo Brutschin	15	14	15	14	15	13	13	13	9	14	13	14	DNS	10	13	14			142
2	(Russia) Aleksey Karachev	17	16	16	16	14	18	16	15	13	16	15	16	18	13	14	17	20†	14	121
3	(Finland) Aki Sandberg	18	15	17	18	17	20	Ret	17	16	18	16	18	17	14	17	19	17	15	93
4	(Russia) Maxim Travin	19	17	18	DNS	16	19	17	16	15	19	Ret	17	15	15	15	18	18	17	87
5	(Italy) Luca Iannaccone	DNS	DNS	22	20	18	21	18	18	17	20	17	NC	19	17	18	20	19	18	57
6	(Finland) Aleksi Tuukkanen	Ret	13	19	15	13	17	15	14											56
7	(Finland) Daniel Aho									12	15	14	13	13	DSQ					44
Guest driver ineligible for points
	(Russia) Mikhail Aleshin																	14	11	0
Pos	Driver	OSC1		SAC		HOC		ASS1		NÜR1		ASS2		LAU		NÜR2		OSC2		Pts

- † — Drivers did not finish the race, but were classified as they completed over 90% of the race distance.

=== SONAX Rookie-Pokal ===
- Points were awarded as follows:

1	2	3	4	5	6	7	8
10	8	6	5	4	3	2	1

Pos	Driver	OSC1		SAC		HOC		ASS1		NÜR1		ASS2		LAU		NÜR2		OSC2		Pts
1	(Denmark) Kevin Magnussen	1	2	5	3	2	5	7	5	Ret	7	2	4	1	9	1	5	4	3	128
2	(Germany) Daniel Abt	2	3	4	2	5	3	2	1	5	3	10	15	4	4	2	2	1	16†	125
3	(Sweden) Felix Rosenqvist	Ret	11	2	Ret	Ret	8	1	2	2	2	6	1	8	2	5	4	11	2	106
4	(Sweden) Jimmy Eriksson	8	4	Ret	6	6	7	10	11	7	9	3	9	2	1	Ret	6	Ret	DNS	77
5	(Israel) Alon Day	13	10	11	10	10	4	4	12	8	6	Ret	7	10	5	8	7	8	9	70
6	(Brazil) Luís Felipe Derani	16	8	9	9	4	6	Ret	10	Ret	11	5	12	7	DSQ	Ret	9	9	4	59
7	(Austria) René Binder	10	Ret	13	12	12	14	12	Ret	4	10	8	3	16†	16	Ret	16	Ret	13	37
8	(Denmark) Marco Sørensen	20	5	21	4	7	10									3	12			23
9	(Switzerland) Sandro Zeller	14	Ret	20	Ret	11	Ret	14	8	14	13			14	12	16	11	16	8	21
10	(Germany) Riccardo Brutschin	15	14	15	14	15	13	13	13	9	14	13	14	DNS	10	13	14	12	12	21
11	(Austria) Klaus Bachler																	5	5	11
12	(Angola) Luís Sá Silva	12	Ret	14	19	DNS	9													7
13	(Finland) Daniel Aho									12	15	14	13	13	DSQ					7
14	(Austria) Kevin Friesacher	9	12																	6
15	(Russia) Aleksey Karachev	17	16	16	16	14	18	16	15	13	16	15	16	18	13	14	17	20†	14	4
16	(Finland) Aleksi Tuukkanen	Ret	13	19	15	13	17	15	14											0
Guest drivers ineligible for points
	(Sweden) Kevin Kleveros															6	15			0
	(Russia) Mikhail Aleshin																	14	11	0
Pos	Driver	OSC1		SAC		HOC		ASS1		NÜR1		ASS2		LAU		NÜR2		OSC2		Pts

Colour	Result
Gold	Winner
Silver	Second place
Bronze	Third place
Green	Points classification
Blue	Non-points classification
Blue	Non-classified finish (NC)
Purple	Retired, not classified (Ret)
Red	Did not qualify (DNQ)
Red	Did not pre-qualify (DNPQ)
Black	Disqualified (DSQ)
White	Did not start (DNS)
White	Withdrew (WD)
White	Race cancelled (C)
Blank	Did not practice (DNP)
Blank	Did not arrive (DNA)
Blank	Excluded (EX)

- † — Drivers did not finish the race, but were classified as they completed over 90% of the race distance.

== See also ==
- 2010 Formula 3 Euro Series season
- 2010 Masters of Formula 3
