= Artline Engineering =

Automobile manufacturer

- Founded: 1998
- Team principal(s): Alexander Nesterov
- Founder(s): Shota Abkhazava
- Current series: Lamborghini Super Trofeo Europe; Ultimate Cup Series
- Former series: German Formula Three; Russian Formula 3 Russian Formula 1600
- Teams' Championships: 2001 Russian Formula 3; 2003 Russian Formula 1600; 2007 Russian Formula 1600; 2008 Russian Formula 3
- Drivers' Championships: 2001 Russian Formula 3 (Mediani); 2003 Russian Formula 1600 (Tyuryumin); 2005 Russian Formula 1600 (Petrov); 2006 Russian Formula 1600 (Samarin); 2007 Russian Formula 1600 (Samarin); 2008 Russian Formula 3 (Semyonov); 2009 German F3 Trophy (Chukanov); 2010 German F3 Trophy (Brutschin)

ArtLine Engineering (Russian: АртЛайн Инжиниринг) is a racing team and race car manufacturer based in Russia and Georgia and specialized on design and production of single seater race cars named ArtTech.

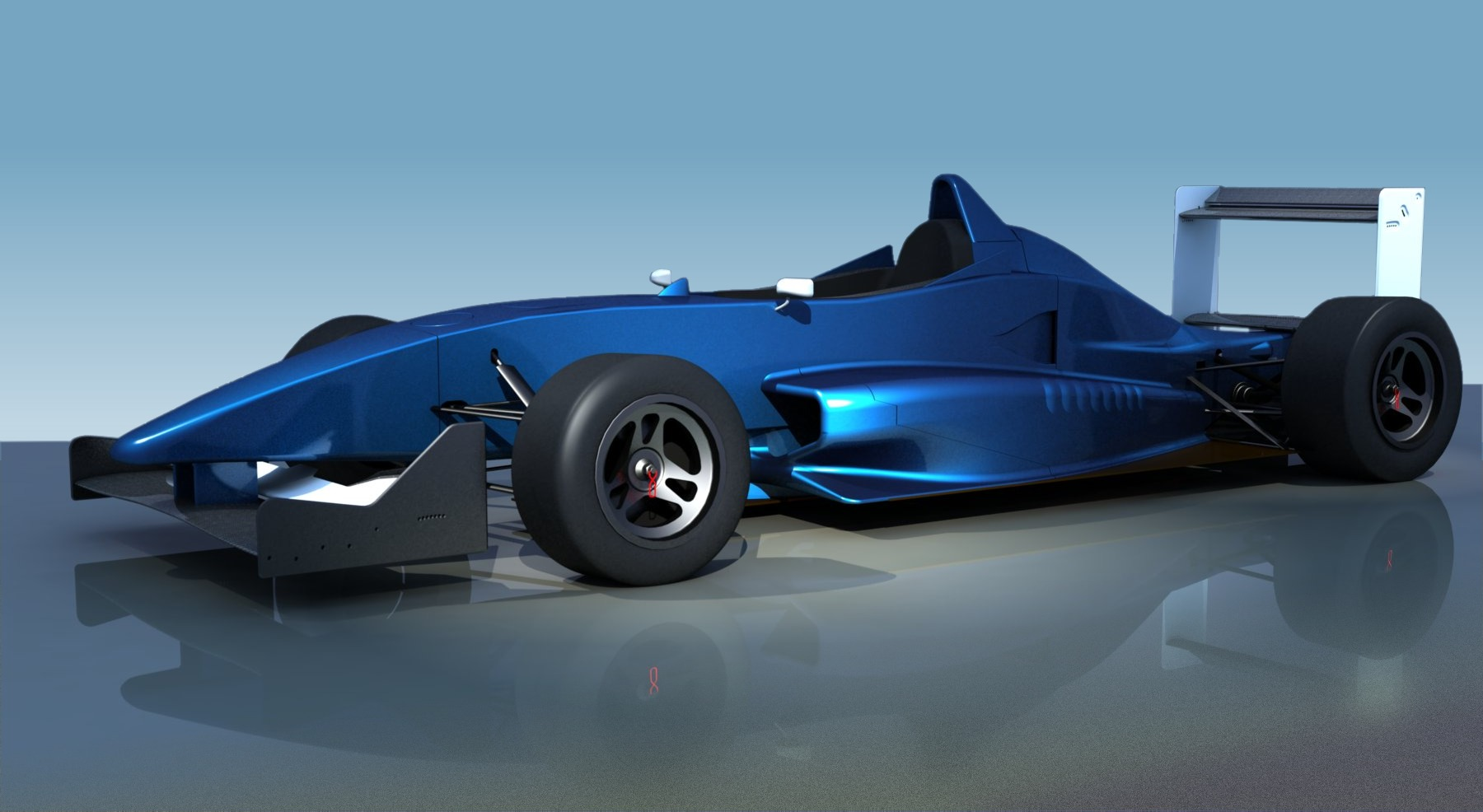
3D-model of the ArtTech F24 chassis

The team was established in 1998 by motorsport engineer and MADI graduate Shota Abkhazava together with his friend and colleague at LSA MADI Sergei Piskunov (1958–2021), who was the chief designer since the founding of the team.

In the region of Eastern Europe and post-Soviet states, ArtLine Engineering is the first and the only engineering company which produces Formula 3 chassis.

== History ==
=== 1998—2008 ===
For its first racing season the team bought the most modern Italian-made race car Dallara F399. Team's first driver Fabio Babini already had experience of participating in Russian Formula 3 series at the wheel of Russian-made open-wheeler Astrada, a car with a tubular space-frame chassis. Rally driver from St-Petersburg Alexander Antonov became Babini's teammate, after 2-years driving of Formula 3 car "JAK-26" for Rothmans-ASPAS team. On the 4th stage of Russian Championship, Babini got the first pole and won the race, thus interrupting series of wins of his compatriot Alberto Pedemonte from Lukoil Racing.

In the 2000th season Babini gave his place to Maurizio Mediani. The team's name was changed to "ArtLine Engineering". For the next several years, competition between Mediani and Pedemonte became the main feature of the Russian circuit racing.

A year after Mediani went top of drivers' championship as early as on the 3rd stage of the Russian F3 series and kept his lead till the end of the season, bringing the first champion's title in the ArtLine's history. The team was enforced with the second Italian, 23-year-old Enrico Toccacelo, and the other Dallara F399. The result was that the team drivers came first in all eight qualifyings of the season and won 6 races, enabled ArtLine to finish second in the teams' championship, still passing Lukoil.

In 2002 ArtLine focused on chassis design named ArtTech. After a years of stagnancy, Russian Formula 3 fell to crisis. One of the biggest teams, Club Racing, left the series, and a number of cars on the grid reduced to 6. The team participated in 4 of 6 championship races getting 3 victories.

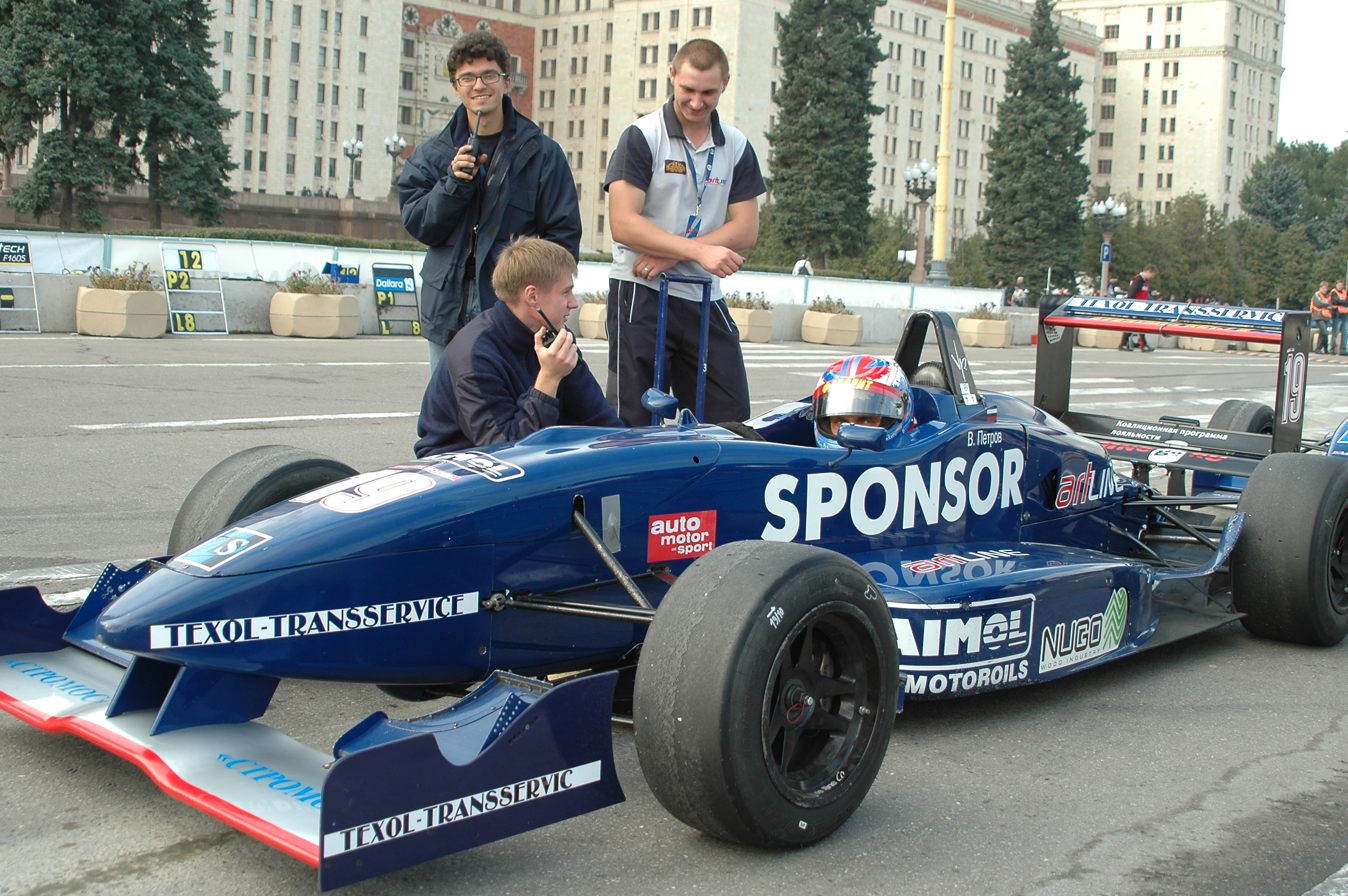
Vitaly Petrov getting ready to start at Sparrow Hills temporary street circuit

Since 2003 ArtLine moved to fast-growing national Formula 1600 class. Dallara chassis adjusted to fit to the Russian-made VAZ engine boosted to 167 hp, and in the second half of the season ArtLine went top of the championship standings. Alexander Tyuryumin and Nikolai Bolshikh-jr drove their Dallaras to remarkable 4 wins, 4 poles and 5 fastest laps, rewriting track records of all the Russian circuits. For the first time in history of Russian closed circuit racing, one team made 3 doubles (first and second places). Tyuryumin won the drivers' championship with ArtLine winning the team's title.

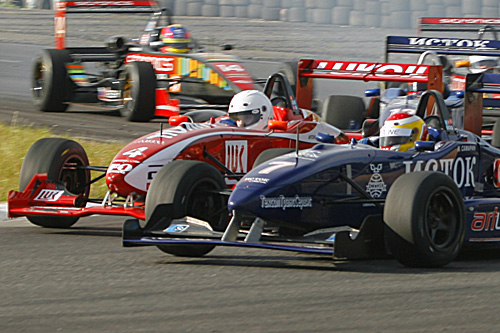
Two ArtLine drivers competing for the lead at ADM Raceway

In the next season Shaitar moved to newly built ArtTech F1605 chassis. Daniil Move became the second ArtTech test-driver. In the first team Kazakov was replaced with Vitaly Petrov, the future Formula 1 driver, who won the title. For the first time since Soviet times, one of national championship stages ran abroad, at the Pärnu circuit. The team came second in the Championship.

In 2006 the team found two new sponsors, Russian electronics manufacturer Sitronics and Istok group of companies. Viktor Shaitar and Mikhail Kozlovskiy drove ArtTech cars under Sitronics brand, while Ivan Samarin and Artiom Barkhiyan sat at the wheel of Dallaras F399 (later Barkhiyan was replaced with A.Tiuriumin). Experienced karting driver Tatiana Chuvaeva became a test pilot for the Sitronics Racing. In this guise she appeared, the first of Russian drivers, in printed commercial. Season started with the first ArtTech victory on the ADM race circuit. Istok ArtLine took the second place in the teams' championship and Sitronics came third. Samarin and Shaitar got 1st and 3rd places.

The year 2007 was the most successful in the history of Russian performances of ArtLine. Since the middle of season, the team replaced both Dallaras with new ArtTech F1607 and won teams' championship while Samarin and Shaiter got 1 and 2 places on the drivers' scoreboard. At the wheel of ArtTech, in Finland Shaitar went top of the 26 rivals from both countries.

The 2008th became the last team's season in Russia. The main event of the year was the North Europe Zone F3 Cup, for the first time held in the country, with 16 cars on the starting grid. Shaitar finished second on the ArtTech car, passing another Russian V.Semionov. This year the team won Russian Formula 3 Light series, held in Russia and Finland.

=== 2009–2013 ===
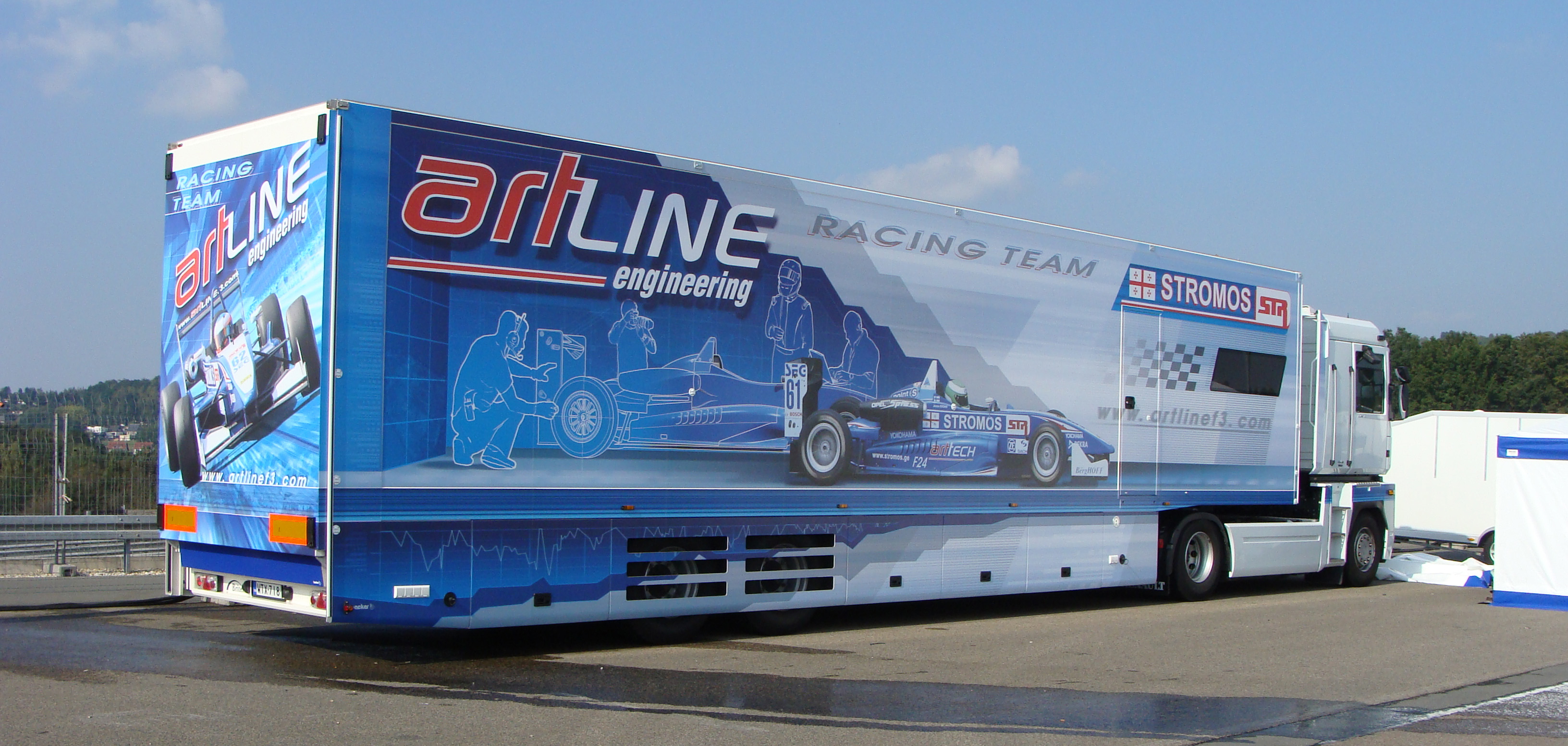
Team Motorhome built in Germany in 2009

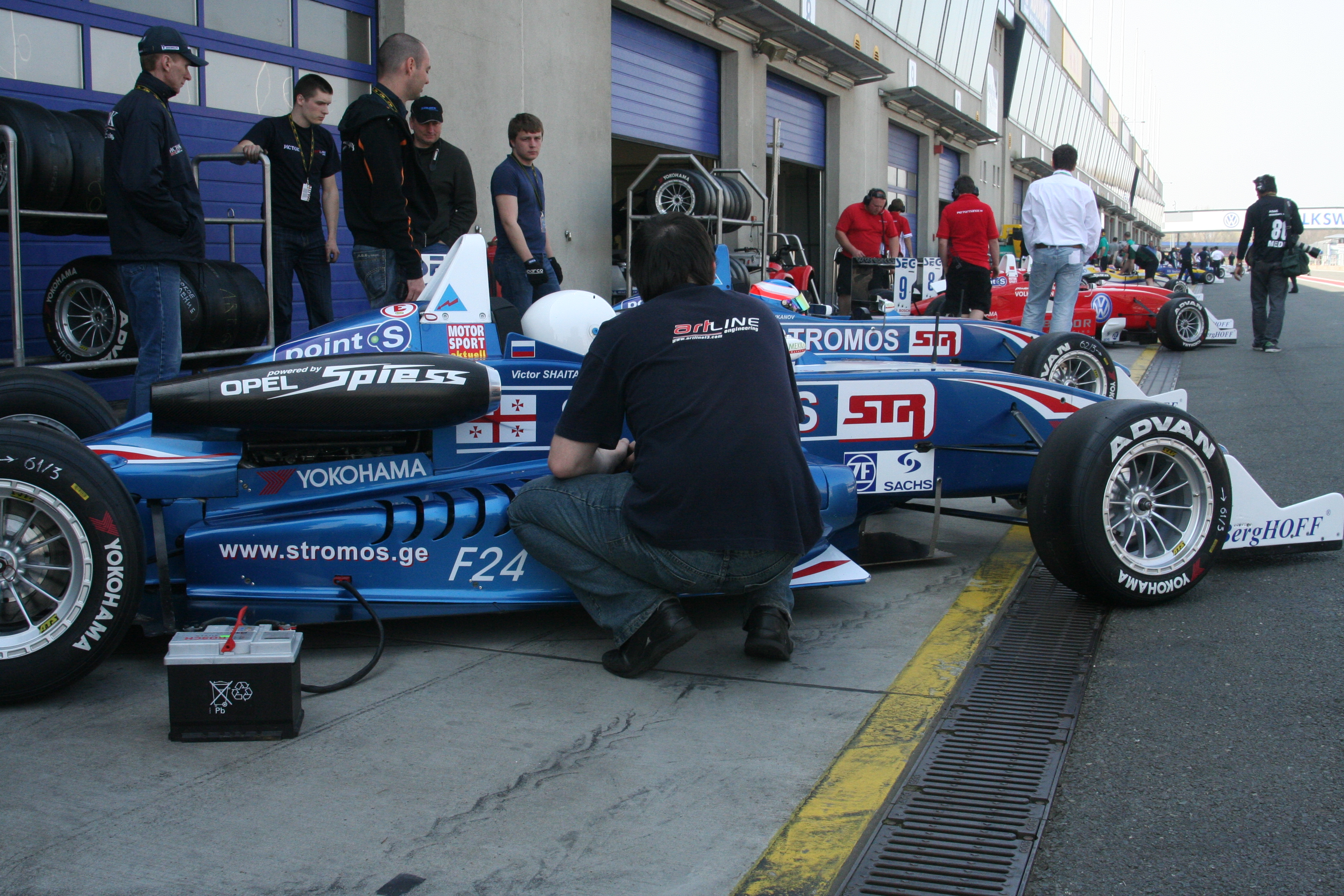
ArtTech cars at Oschersleben, 2009

Since 2009 ArtLine moved to the Deutsche Formel-3-ATS-Cup which succeeded the German F3 Championship, one of the most prestigious European series. As ArtTech model chosen for German Cup was designed and built in 2004, the team, following the Cup regulations, had entered to Trophy League of the series where only old cars were permitted. However, from the middle of season the team leader Sergei Chukanov competed within the top 10 rivals, leaving other Trophy cars far behind. Another fast driver Jesse Krohn was invited to the team, and on the 11th stage in Assen ArtTech cars qualified 2nd and 3rd overall. Finished 5th and 7th, ArtLine drivers brought the first points to the team in the "League A" scoring. In Trophy scoreboard S.Chukanov occupied first position till the season's end and won with a gap of 43 points from the nearest rival, Finnish F3 champion Mika Vähämäki.

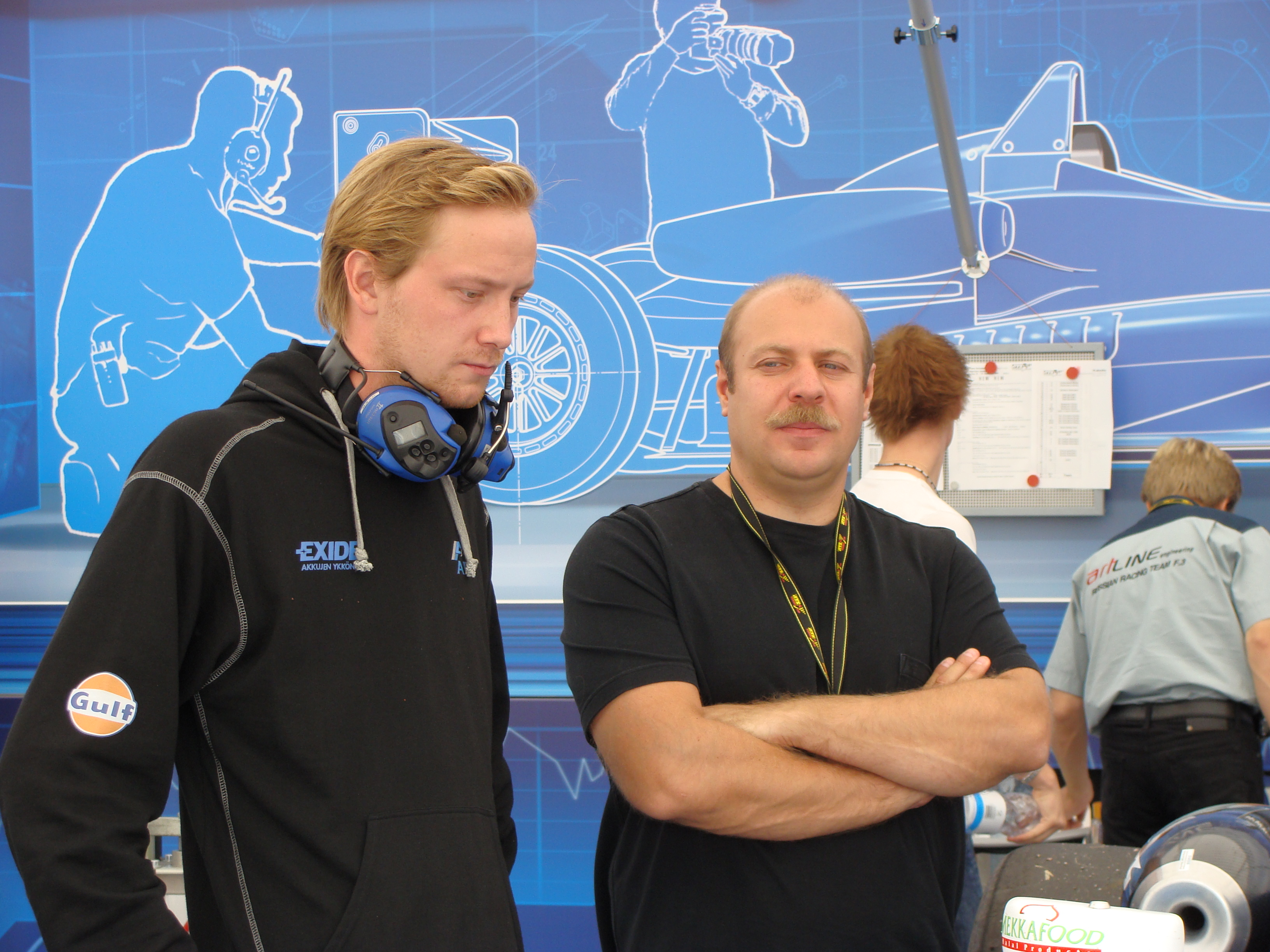
Team manager Jari Rask with its former owner Shota Abkhazava

In 2010 ArtLine continued to dominate in Trophy league, at the same time working on old car improvement and new chassis design. When season started, the team participated with 3 cars, driven by Riccardo Brutschin, Aleksi Tuukkanen and Alexei Karachev. Brutschin finished within the top 9 twice (9th lap – Nürburgring, 14th lap – EuroSpeedway Lausitz); in Oschersleben Renault Word Series champion Mikhail Aleshin joined the team as a guest star and finished on 11th place. In the 2010th Trophy Cup ArtLine took 1st and 2nd positions.

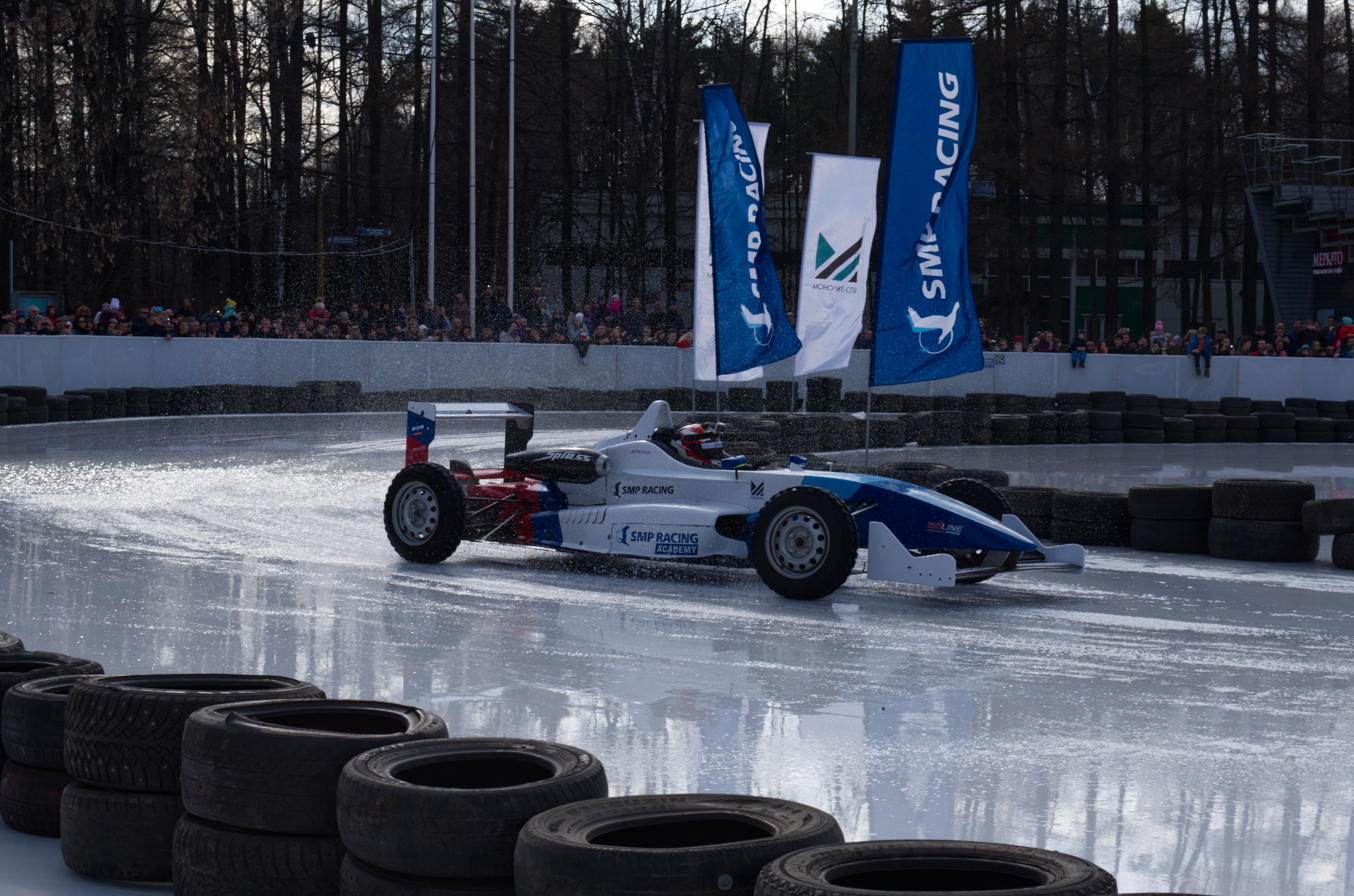
ArtTech F24 car during demonstration racing in Sokolniki Park (Moscow, Russia) on 31 March 2019

In 2011 the team again declared new chassis design as a priority and missed some German events. Mikhail Aleshin and Antti Ramo didn't finish better than 9th; Tom Dillmann and Ivan Samarin joined the team for a couple of races. The team was mostly busy testing new technical solutions; as a result, it took positions from 3 to 6 in the Trophy scoreboard.

=== 2015 ===
In December 2014, the team announced that it would again be building its own chassis to compete in the 2015 F3 European Championship and the 2015 German ATS Cup, with an undisclosed number of entries. The chassis will be designated ArtTech P315 and is intended to use engines from Neil Brown Engineering and Oreca before working on installation kits for Mercedes and Volkswagen engines later in 2015. The car has an unusual feature in that it has a central-exhaust system, a feature not seen in Formula 3 cars since the Dallara cars of the mid-to-late 1990s.

== Championship results ==
Season	Full name	Chassis	Engine	Drivers	Series	Teams' position
1999	Pilot F3 Engineering	Dallara F399, Dallara F393	FIAT	Fabio Babini, Alexander Antonov	Russian F3 Championship	2nd
2000	ArtLine Engineering	Dallara F399, Dallara F393	FIAT	Maurizio Mediani, Alexander Antonov, David Ramishvili	Russian F3 Championship	3rd
2001	ArtLine Engineering	Dallara F399	FIAT	Maurizio Mediani, Enrico Toccacelo	Russian F3 Championship	2nd
2002	ArtLine Engineering	Dallara F399	FIAT	Maurizio Mediani, Alexander Nesterov	Russian F3 Championship	
2003	ArtLine Engineering	Dallara F393	VAZ	Alexander Tyuryumin, Nikolai Bolshikh-jr, Alexei Diadia	Russian F1600 Championship	1st
2004	ArtLine Engineering	Dallara F399, Dallara F393	VAZ	Oleg Kazakov, Viktor Antonov	Russian Formula Lada Championship	2nd
2004	UNIT-ArtLine	Dallara F399, Dallara F393	VAZ	Viktor Shaitar, David Markozov	Russian Formula Lada Championship	
2005	ArtLine ProTeam	Dallara F399	VAZ	Vitaly Petrov, Viktor Antonov, Vladimir Labazov	Russian F1600 Championship	2nd
2005	ArtLine Engineering	ArtTech-F1605	VAZ	Viktor Shaitar, Daniil Move	Russian F1600 Championship	
2006	Sitronics Racing	ArtTech-F1605M	VAZ	Mikhail Kozlovskiy, Viktor Shaitar	Russian F1600 Championship	3rd
2006	Istok ArtLine Racing	Dallara F399	VAZ	Ivan Samarin, Artiom Barkhiyan, Alexander Tyuryumin	Russian F1600 Championship	2nd
2007	Istok ArtLine Racing	Dallara F399, ArtTech-F1607	VAZ	Viktor Shaitar, Ivan Samarin	Russian F1600 Championship	1st
2008	ArtLine Racing	Dallara F308, ArtTech-F1607	Opel Spiess, FIAT	Viktor Shaitar, Ivan Samarin	Formula 3 Light	1st
2008	ArtLine Racing	Dallara F308, ArtTech-F1607	Opel Spiess, FIAT	Viktor Shaitar, Ivan Samarin	North Europe Zone Formula 3 Cup	
2008	ArtLine Racing	Dallara F308, ArtTech-F1607	Opel Spiess, FIAT	Viktor Shaitar, Ivan Samarin	Finnish Formula 3 Championship	
2009	Stromos ArtLine	ArtTech F24	OPC Challenge	Viktor Shaitar, Sergey Chukanov, Jesse Krohn, Dominik Schraml	German Formula 3 Championship	
2010	Stromos ArtLine	ArtTech F24, ArtTech F24-06, Dallara F307	OPC Challenge	Riccardo Brutschin, Alexei Karachev, Aleksi Tuukkanen, Daniel Aho	German Formula 3 Championship	
2011	Stromos ArtLine	ArtTech F24M, Dallara F307	Opel, Mercedes	Antti Rammo, Mikhail Aleshin, Daniel Aho, Ivan Samarin, Tom Dillmann	German Formula 3 Championship	
