= Russian Formula 1600 Championship =

- Category: Single-seater
- Country: Russia
- Inaugural season: 1996
- Folded: 2007
- Constructors: ArtTech, Dallara, Estonia, Reynard
- Engine suppliers: Fiat, Lada, Mercedes, Opel
- Last Drivers' champion: Ivan Samarin
- Last Teams' champion: ISTOK - ArtLine Racing
- Official website: http://www.f1600.ru

Russian Formula 1600 Championship was a Russian formula racing competition that was held in 1996–2007.

== Champions ==
All teams and drivers were Russian-registered

Season	Championship			ASPAS Cup		
Season	Drivers' Champion	Car	Teams' Champion	Drivers' Champion	Car	Teams' Champion
2007	Ivan Samarin	ArtTech	ISTOK - ArtLine Racing	Not held		
2006	Ivan Samarin	ArtTech	Lukoil Racing	Not held		
2005	Vitaly Petrov	Dallara	Lukoil Racing	Not held		
2004	Alexey Pavlovskiy	Dallara	Lukoil Racing	Not held		
2003	Alexander Tyuryumin	Dallara	ArtLine Engineering	Not held		
2002	Viktor Shaytar	Dallara F395	Formula Z	Not held		
2001	Dmitriy Shcheglov	Estonia 26	LogoVAZ-Belyaevo	Not held		
2000	Alexander Nesterov	Dallara F395	LogoVAZ-City	Not held		
1999	Alexander Kuzmin	Estonia 26	LogoVAZ-City	Not held		
1998	Alexander Nesterov	?	ABRO-NVR-100,1	Edgard Lindgren	Estonia 25	AKKS Motorsport
1997	Alexander Potekhin	?	West Canopus Castrol	Viktor Kozankov	?	West Canopus Castrol
1996	Viktor Kozankov	?	West Canopus Castrol	?	?	?
