= Armando Parente =

Portuguese racing driver (born 1989)

- Nationality: (Portugal) Portuguese
- Born: 29 March 1989 (age 37) Lisbon, Portugal

Armando Parente (born 29 March 1989) is a Portuguese racing driver, who won the 2008 ADAC Formel Masters season.

== Career ==
At nine years of age, Parente began go-kart racing and performed well winning the Portugal Cup (2001, 2004 e 2006), the Portugal Open (2001 e 2002), the Portuguese Champion (2002 e 2004), and the Italian Open (2005).

In 2008, Parente moved to formulas and was crowned as Champion of the ADAC Formel Masters in Germany. He was also a rookie driver in A1GP, testing in Sepang, Malaysia (2008) and Algarve, Portugal (2009).

In 2011, Parente returned to go-kart and won the Portugal Championship in X30 Shifter category. In 2012 he renewed his title of Portuguese Champion and he was also the winner of the Portugal Cup.

After not racing for a year, Parente won again in 2013 the Portugal Cup in X30 Shifter category.

In 2014, Parente debuted at the National Championship of Sport Prototypes and won in the C3 category, teaming with Rafael Lobato, driving a Radical SR3 from Parkalgar Racing Team. At the same time he participated in the Formula Acceleration 1 Championship (FA1) in Portimão, Navarra and Nurburgring.

In 2015, Parente won the National Sport Prototype Championship, this time in the main category, teaming with Francisco Abreu at the wheel of a Tattus PY 012 from Novadriver Team.

After a three-year break, Parente returned to the competition at the Portugal Touring Championship (TCR Series), in 2018, driving a Volkswagen Golf GTI TCR from Novadriver Team, becoming vice champion.

== Racing record ==
- 1999 - 7º Portuguese Championship - Karting Cadet
- 2000 - 3º Portuguese Championship - Karting Juvenile
- 2001 - Winner of Portugal K Open - Karting Juvenile
- 2001 - Vice Portuguese Champion - Karting Juvenile
- 2001 - Winner of Portugal Cup - Karting Juvenile
- 2002 - Winner of Portugal K Open - Karting Junior
- 2002 - Portuguese Champion - Karting Junior
- 2003 - 9º European Championship - Karting Junior
- 2004 - Portuguese Champion - Karting ICA
- 2004 - Winner of Portugal Cup - Karting ICA
- 2005 - Winner of Italian Open - Karting ICA
- 2006 - Portuguese Driver in World Championship - Karting ICC
- 2006 - Winner of Portugal Cup - Karting ICC
- 2007 - 4º Position in WSK - Karting KZ2
- 2007 - 9º European Championship - Karting KZ1
- 2007 - 14º Position in World Cup - Karting KZ2
- 2008 - ADAC Formel Masters Champion - Germany
- 2011 - Portuguese Champion - Karting X30 Shifter
- 2012 - Portuguese Champion - Karting X30 Shifter
- 2012 - Winner of Portugal Cup - Karting X30 Shifter
- 2013 - Winner of Portugal Cup - Karting X30 Shifter
- 2014 - Portuguese Champion of Sport Prototypes - C3 Category
- 2015 - Portuguese Champion of Sport Prototypes - CN Category
- 2018 - Vice Portuguese Champion of Touring Car - TCR Series

Sporting positions
Preceded by Inaugural	ADAC Formel Masters; Champion; 2008	Succeeded by Daniel Abt
