= 2008 ADAC Formel Masters =

Motorsport season

Seasons
- ← none 2009 →

The 2008 ADAC Formel Masters season was the first season of the open wheel racing series from Germany. The ADAC Formel Masters is a new continental series for junior drivers powered by Volkswagen, a 1.6-litre FSI engine delivering 145 hp (108 kW) will power the single-seaters made by the Italian manufacturer Dallara.

The season started on May 9, 2008, at the Oschersleben and ended on October 26 at Hockenheim with the win of the Portuguese driver Armando Parente.

== Teams and drivers ==
- All cars are powered by Volkswagen engines, and Dallara Formulino chassis.

Team	No.	Driver	Rounds
(Germany) rhino's Leipert Motorsport	2	(Austria) Ferdinand Stuck	All
(Germany) rhino's Leipert Motorsport	3	(Germany) Christian Wangard	All
(Germany) Mücke Motorsport	4	(Austria) Willi Steindl	All
(Germany) Mücke Motorsport	5	(Germany) Philip Wulbusch	All
(Germany) Team Abt Sportsline	6	(Germany) Daniel Abt	All
(Germany) Team Abt Sportsline	7	(Germany) Markus Pommer	All
(Germany) Eifelland Racing	8	(Germany) Burkhard Maring	All
(Germany) Team KUG Motorsport	9	(Germany) Dennis Vollmair	1–5, 8
(Germany) Brückner Motorsport	11	(Austria) Kevin Friesacher	All
(Germany) Brückner Motorsport	12	(Latvia) Otto Birznieks	All
(Germany) Zettl Motorsport	14	(Germany) Michael Zettl	1–2
(Germany) Zettl Motorsport	15	(Germany) Denni Ranginger	1–2
(Germany) Zettl Motorsport	31	(Switzerland) Philipp Frommenwiler	8
(Netherlands) Van Amersfoort Racing	16	(Finland) Emma Kimiläinen	All
(Netherlands) Van Amersfoort Racing	17	(Denmark) Kevin Magnussen	2–3, 8
(Germany) URD Rennsport	18	(Germany) Nico Monien	All
(Germany) URD Rennsport	19	(Portugal) Armando Parente	All
(Germany) Team Mayer	20	(Germany) Maximilian Mayer	All
(Germany) Maassen Motorsport	21	(Germany) Sascha Steinhardt	All
(Austria) Neuhauser Racing	22	(Austria) Richard Cvörnjek	All
(Austria) Neuhauser Racing	23	(Austria) Klaus Bachler	All
(Germany) ma-con Motorsport	24	(Denmark) Marco Sørensen	5–8
(Germany) ma-con Motorsport	25	(India) Ashwin Sundar	1–7
(Germany) ma-con Motorsport	28	(United States) Liam Kenney	8
(Germany) GU-Racing International	26	(Ukraine) Valerij Bercha	1
(Germany) GU-Racing International	27	(Austria) Johann Ledermair	All
(Germany) Buchbinder by emotional engineering	30	(United Kingdom) Freddie Hunt	8

== Race calendar and results ==
Round		Circuit	Date	Pole position	Fastest lap	Winning driver	Winning team	Supporting
1	R1	(Germany) Oschersleben	10 May	(Austria) Klaus Bachler	(Austria) Willi Steindl	(Austria) Willi Steindl	(Germany) Mücke Motorsport	ADAC Master Weekend
1	R2	(Germany) Oschersleben	11 May	(Austria) Willi Steindl	(Austria) Willi Steindl	(Austria) Willi Steindl	(Germany) Mücke Motorsport	ADAC Master Weekend
2	R1	(Germany) Nürburgring	24 May	(Germany) Sascha Steinhardt	(Denmark) Kevin Magnussen	(Germany) Burkard Maring	(Germany) Eifelland Racing	24 Hours Nürburgring
2	R2	(Germany) Nürburgring	24 May	(Germany) Burkard Maring	(Germany) Burkard Maring	(Germany) Burkard Maring	(Germany) Eifelland Racing	24 Hours Nürburgring
3	R1	(Netherlands) TT Circuit Assen	19 July	(Portugal) Armando Parente	(Austria) Klaus Bachler	(Austria) Klaus Bachler	(Austria) Neuhauser Racing	Dutch Truck Grand Prix
3	R2	(Netherlands) TT Circuit Assen	20 July	(Denmark) Kevin Magnussen	(Germany) Nico Monien	(Germany) Nico Monien	(Germany) URD Rennsport	Dutch Truck Grand Prix
4	R1	(Germany) Nürburgring	16 August	(Germany) Daniel Abt	(Finland) Emma Kimiläinen	(Germany) Markus Pommer	(Germany) Team Abt Sportsline	1000 km Nürburgring
4	R2	(Germany) Nürburgring	17 August	(Germany) Markus Pommer	(Portugal) Armando Parente	(Austria) Kevin Friesacher	(Germany) Brückner Motorsport	1000 km Nürburgring
5	R1	(Germany) EuroSpeedway Lausitz	6 September	(Denmark) Marco Sørensen	(Denmark) Marco Sørensen	(Austria) Kevin Friesacher	(Germany) Brückner Motorsport	ADAC GT Masters
5	R2	(Germany) EuroSpeedway Lausitz	7 September	(Denmark) Marco Sørensen	(Germany) Daniel Abt	(Denmark) Marco Sørensen	(Germany) ma-con Motorsport	ADAC GT Masters
6	R1	(Germany) Sachsenring	20 September	(Denmark) Marco Sørensen	(Denmark) Marco Sørensen	(Portugal) Armando Parente	(Germany) URD Rennsport	ADAC Master Weekend
6	R2	(Germany) Sachsenring	21 September	(Denmark) Marco Sørensen	(Germany) Nico Monien	(Denmark) Marco Sørensen	(Germany) ma-con Motorsport	ADAC Master Weekend
7	R1	(Germany) Oschersleben	11 October	(Germany) Nico Monien	(Germany) Nico Monien	(Germany) Nico Monien	(Germany) URD Rennsport	ADAC Master Weekend
7	R2	(Germany) Oschersleben	12 October	(Portugal) Armando Parente	(Denmark) Marco Sørensen	(Denmark) Marco Sørensen	(Germany) ma-con Motorsport	ADAC Master Weekend
8	R1	(Germany) Hockenheim	25 October	(Denmark) Marco Sørensen	(Austria) Klaus Bachler	(Denmark) Marco Sørensen	(Germany) ma-con Motorsport	DTM
8	R2	(Germany) Hockenheim	26 October	(Portugal) Armando Parente	(Austria) Klaus Bachler	(Austria) Klaus Bachler	(Austria) Neuhauser Racing	DTM

== Championship standings ==
=== Drivers' ===
Position	1st	2nd	3rd	4th	5th	6th	7th	8th	9th	10th	Pole
Points	20	15	12	10	8	6	4	3	2	1	3

Pos	Driver	OSC (Germany)		NÜR (Germany)		ASS (Netherlands)		NÜR (Germany)		LAU (Germany)		SAC (Germany)		OSC (Germany)		HOC (Germany)		Pts
1	(Portugal) Armando Parente	5	9	4	4	**2**	3	14	2	6	2	1	4	3	**3**	14	**2**	171
2	(Germany) Nico Monien	12	6	6	6	4	1	3	3	12	3	4	6	**1**	2	11	13	141
3	(Austria) Klaus Bachler	**4**	2	3	Ret	1	5	6	11	Ret	5	6	3	8	6	3	1	141
4	(Denmark) Marco Sørensen									**2**	**1**	**14**	**1**	2	1	**1**	14	125
5	(Germany) Markus Pommer	3	3	5	9	6	Ret	1	**15**	Ret	9	3	7	5	7	2	Ret	108
6	(Germany) Philip Wulbusch	2	5	NC	3	3	13	18	5	4	10	11	2	4	5	13	5	107
7	(Germany) Burkard Maring	7	16	1	**1**	5	6	5	7	7	13	Ret	11	10	9	6	3	98
8	(Germany) Daniel Abt	17	8	9	20	7	8	**2**	Ret	3	4	2	Ret	7	4	4	Ret	91
9	(Austria) Kevin Friesacher	11	14	7	17	8	4	9	1	1	8	7	5	10	8	16	6	84
10	(Finland) Emma Kimiläinen	6	4	8	18	Ret	2	4	Ret	5	6	Ret	12	6	9	Ret	4	76
11	(Austria) Willi Steindl	1	**1**	Ret	Ret	14	14	17	Ret	8	11	5	10	12	Ret	12	Ret	55
12	(Denmark) Kevin Magnussen			2	2	DSQ	DSQ									Ret	Ret	30
13	(Germany) Christian Wangard	9	17	Ret	7	9	11	15	9	9	16	Ret	8	13	11	5	7	27
14	(Germany) Dennis Vollmair	Ret	11	10	5	11	7	12	4	DNS	DNS					Ret	Ret	23
15	(Germany) Sascha Steinhardt	10	10	**Ret**	19	18	15	8	8	14	19	8	9	14	Ret	18	8	19
16	(Austria) Richard Cvörnjek	8	7	Ret	12	16	10	10	12	10	17	10	16	11	15	9	DNS	13
17	(Germany) Johann Ledermair	Ret	12	11	8	12	9	7	16	11	15	13	15	Ret	12	Ret	Ret	9
18	(Latvia) Otto Birznieks	15	15	Ret	13	15	12	19	6	15	14	12	18	15	14	17	10	7
19	(Austria) Ferdinand Stuck	Ret	19	12	11	10	Ret	16	13	DNS	7	Ret	14	18	Ret	Ret	9	7
20	(United States) Liam Kenney															7	DNS	4
21	(Germany) Maximilian Mayer	13	21	Ret	10	17	16	11	14	Ret	18	Ret	17	17	16	8	11	4
22	(India) Ashwin Sundar	Ret	13	Ret	14	13	Ret	13	10	13	12	9	13	16	13			3
23	(Switzerland) Philipp Frommenwiler															10	DNS	1
	(United Kingdom) Freddie Hunt															15	12	0
	(Germany) Danny Reininger	16	22	14	16													0
	(Germany) Michael Zettl	DNS	18	13	15													0
	(Ukraine) Valerij Bercha	14	20															0
Pos	Driver	OSC (Germany)		NÜR (Germany)		ASS (Netherlands)		NÜR (Germany)		LAU (Germany)		SAC (Germany)		OSC (Germany)		HOC (Germany)		Pts

Colour	Result
Gold	Winner
Silver	Second place
Bronze	Third place
Green	Points classification
Blue	Non-points classification
Blue	Non-classified finish (NC)
Purple	Retired, not classified (Ret)
Red	Did not qualify (DNQ)
Red	Did not pre-qualify (DNPQ)
Black	Disqualified (DSQ)
White	Did not start (DNS)
White	Withdrew (WD)
White	Race cancelled (C)
Blank	Did not practice (DNP)
Blank	Did not arrive (DNA)
Blank	Excluded (EX)

**Bold** - Pole
Italics - Fastest Lap
**W** - Wet Race

=== Teams' ===
Position	1st	2nd	3rd	4th	5th	6th	7th	8th	9th	10th
Points	20	15	12	10	8	6	4	3	2	1

Pos	Team	OSC (Germany)		NÜR (Germany)		ASS (Netherlands)		NÜR (Germany)		LAU (Germany)		SAC (Germany)		OSC (Germany)		HOC (Germany)		Pts
1	(Germany) URD Motorsport	4	5	4	4	2	1	2	2	6	2	1	4	1	2	8	2	207
2	(Austria) Neuhauser Racing	3	2	3	10	1	4	5	9	9	4	4	3	6	5	3	1	160
3	(Germany) Team Abt Sportsline	2	3	5	8	6	7	1	11	3	3	2	6	4	3	2	Ret	152
4	(Germany) Mücke Motorsport	1	1	Ret	3	4	10	13	4	4	8	3	2	3	4	9	5	147
5	(Germany) ma-con Motorsport	Ret	9	Ret	12	11	Ret	11	7	2	1	7	1	2	1	1	11	120
6	(Germany) Eifelland-Racing	6	11	1	1	5	5	4	5	7	9	Ret	9	7	8	5	3	117
7	(Netherlands) Van Amersfoort Racing	5	4	2	2	3	2	3	Ret	5	5	Ret	10	5	7	Ret	4	114
8	(Germany) Brückner Motorsport	9	10	6	11	7	3	8	1	1	7	5	5	8	6	11	6	105
9	(Germany) Team rhino's Leipert	7	12	9	6	8	9	12	7	8	6	Ret	7	9	9	4	7	53
10	(Germany) Team KUG Motorsport	Ret	7	7	5	9	6	10	3	DNS	DNS					Ret	Ret	38
11	(Germany) Maassen Motorsport	8	6	Ret	14	13	11	7	6	11	12	6	8	10	Ret	12	8	32
12	(Germany) GU-Racing International	11	8	8	7	10	8	6	12	10	10	8	11	Ret	10	Ret	Ret	27
13	(Germany) Team Mayer	10	14	Ret	9	12	12	9	10	Ret	11	Ret	12	11	11	6	9	14
14	(Germany) Zettl Motorsport	12	13	10	13											7	DNS	5
15	(Germany) Buchbinder by emotional engineering															10	10	2
Pos	Team	OSC (Germany)		NÜR (Germany)		ASS (Netherlands)		NÜR (Germany)		LAU (Germany)		SAC (Germany)		OSC (Germany)		HOC (Germany)		Pts
