= 2009 German Formula Three Championship =

Seasons
- ← 2008 2010 →

The 2009 ATS F3 Cup was the seventh edition of the German F3 Cup. It commenced on 12 April and ended on 18 October. Belgian driver Laurens Vanthoor (Van Amersfoort Racing) won the title with two rounds to spare.

== Teams and drivers ==
Guest drivers in italics.

| Team | Chassis | Engine | No. | Driver | Status | Rounds |
Cup Class
| (Switzerland) Jo Zeller Racing | Dallara F306/014 | Mercedes | 1 | (Switzerland) Rahel Frey | | 1–5 |
| (Switzerland) Jo Zeller Racing | Dallara F306/014 | Mercedes | 1 | (Germany) Tim Sandtler | | 7 |
| (Switzerland) Jo Zeller Racing | Dallara F305/011 | Mercedes | 10 | (Indonesia) Zahir Ali | | 4–5 |
| (Switzerland) Jo Zeller Racing | Dallara F305/011 | Mercedes | 10 | (Austria) Bernd Herndlhofer | | 6 |
| (Switzerland) Jo Zeller Racing | Dallara F305/011 | Mercedes | 10 | (Switzerland) Sandro Zeller | R | 9 |
| (Austria) HS Technik Motorsport | Dallara F305/037 | Mercedes | 2 | (Austria) Bernd Herndlhofer | | 1–5 |
| (Austria) HS Technik Motorsport | Dallara F305/037 | Mercedes | 2 | (Latvia) Harald Schlegelmilch | | 6–9 |
| (Austria) HS Technik Motorsport | Dallara F306/025 | Mercedes | 3 | (Austria) Willi Steindl | R | 1–7 |
| (Austria) HS Technik Motorsport | Dallara F306/025 | Mercedes | 3 | (United Kingdom) Joey Foster | | 9 |
| (Austria) HS Technik Motorsport | Dallara F305/039 | Mercedes | 4 | (Brazil) Rafael Suzuki | | 6–7, 9 |
| (Austria) HS Technik Motorsport | Dallara F305/039 | Mercedes | 4 | (United Kingdom) Joey Foster | | 8 |
| (Netherlands) Van Amersfoort Racing | Dallara F306/038 | Volkswagen | 5 | (Belgium) Laurens Vanthoor | | All |
| (Netherlands) Van Amersfoort Racing | Dallara F306/023 | Volkswagen | 6 | (Netherlands) Stef Dusseldorp | R | All |
| (Netherlands) Van Amersfoort Racing | Dallara F305/046 | Volkswagen | 7 | (India) Armaan Ebrahim | | 9 |
| (Sweden) Performance Racing | Dallara F305/041 | Volkswagen | 8 | (Brazil) Rafael Suzuki | | 1–5 |
| (Sweden) Performance Racing | Dallara F305/041 | Volkswagen | 8 | (Indonesia) Zahir Ali | | 6–7 |
| (Sweden) Performance Racing | Dallara F305/041 | Volkswagen | 8 | (Germany) Peter Elkmann | | 8 |
| (Sweden) Performance Racing | Dallara F305/041 | Volkswagen | 8 | (Germany) Daniel Abt | R | 9 |
| (Sweden) Performance Racing | Dallara F305/051 | Volkswagen | 9 | (Hong Kong) Adderly Fong | | All |
| (Austria) Neuhauser Racing | Dallara F306/034 | Mercedes | 11 | (Austria) Marco Oberhauser | | All |
| (Austria) Neuhauser Racing | Dallara F305/045 | Mercedes | 12 | (France) Tom Dillmann | | 7–9 |
| (Switzerland) Swiss Racing Team | Dallara F305/034 | OPC Challenge | 14 | (Sweden) Max Nilsson | | All |
| (Germany) Jenichen Motorsport | Dallara F305/063 | OPC Challenge | 17 | (Brazil) Rafael Suzuki | | 8 |
| (Luxembourg) Racing Experience | Dallara F306/010 | Mercedes | 21 | (Luxembourg) David Hauser | | 1–2, 4–9 |
| (Luxembourg) Racing Experience | Dallara F305/012 | Mercedes | 22 | (Luxembourg) Gary Hauser | | All |
| (Luxembourg) Racing Experience | Dallara F306/009 | Mercedes | 23 | (France) Nicolas Marroc | R | All |
| (Luxembourg) Racing Experience | Mygale M-07/00 | Opel | 24 | (Luxembourg) Louis Wagner | | 7 |
| (Germany) Zettl Sportsline Motorsport | Dallara F306/008 | Mercedes | 27 | (Germany) Markus Pommer | R | All |
| (Germany) Zettl Sportsline Motorsport | Dallara F305/030 | Mercedes | 28 | (Germany) Nico Monien | R | All |
| (Germany) Zettl Sportsline Motorsport | Dallara F307/011 | Mercedes | 29 | (Netherlands) Shirley van der Lof | | All |
| (Russia) ZyXEL RRT | Dallara F306/026 | Mercedes | 35 | (Russia) Vladimir Semenov | R | All |
Trophy Class
| (Germany) Rhino's Leipert Motorsport | Dallara F304/012 | Opel | 55 | (Italy) Luca Iannaccone | | All |
| (Germany) Jenichen Motorsport | Dallara F302/084 | Opel | 57 | (Russia) Nikolay Martsenko | R | 1, 9 |
| (Austria) Franz Wöss Racing | Dallara F302/050 | Opel | 59 | (Germany) Stefan Neuburger | | 3 |
| (Austria) Franz Wöss Racing | Dallara F302/033 | Opel | 60 | (Germany) Francesco Lopez | | 1–7 |
| (Russia) Stromos Art-Line | ArtTech F24/007 | OPC Challenge | 61 | (Russia) Viktor Shaytar | R | 1 |
| (Russia) Stromos Art-Line | ArtTech F24/007 | OPC Challenge | 61 | (Germany) Dominik Schraml | | 2–3 |
| (Russia) Stromos Art-Line | ArtTech F24/007 | OPC Challenge | 61 | (Finland) Jesse Krohn | | 4, 6–7, 9 |
| (Russia) Stromos Art-Line | ArtTech F24/008 | OPC Challenge | 62 | (Ukraine) Sergey Chukanov | | All |
| (Finland) ADRF | Dallara F302/074 | Opel | 64 | (Finland) Mika Vähämäki | R | All |
| (Finland) ADRF | Dallara F303/021 | Opel | 65 | (Finland) Marko Vähämäki | R | 9 |
| (Austria) HS Technik Motorsport | Dallara F302/065 | Opel | 66 | (Slovakia) Nikolas Kvasai | | 9 |
| (Switzerland) Jo Zeller Racing | Dallara F301/006 | Opel | 67 | (Switzerland) Urs Rüttimann | | 3, 9 |

== Calendar ==
Five rounds were part of the ADAC Master Weekend with rounds supporting 24 Hours Nürburgring in May, FIA GT Oschersleben 2 Hours in June, Rizla Race Day and 1000 km Nürburgring in August. With the exception of round at TT Circuit Assen, all rounds took place on German soil.

| Round | | Circuit | Date | Pole position | Fastest lap | Winning driver | Winning team | Secondary class winner |
|---|---|---|---|---|---|---|---|---|
| 1 | R1 | Motorsport Arena Oschersleben | 12 April | (Belgium) Laurens Vanthoor | (Belgium) Laurens Vanthoor | (Belgium) Laurens Vanthoor | (Netherlands) Van Amersfoort Racing | T: (Ukraine) Sergey Chukanov; R: (Netherlands) Stef Dusseldorp |
| 1 | R2 | Motorsport Arena Oschersleben | 13 April | (Belgium) Laurens Vanthoor | (Netherlands) Stef Dusseldorp | (Netherlands) Stef Dusseldorp | (Netherlands) Van Amersfoort Racing | T: (Ukraine) Sergey Chukanov; R: (Netherlands) Stef Dusseldorp |
| 2 | R1 | Nürburgring | 22 May | (Belgium) Laurens Vanthoor | (Switzerland) Rahel Frey | (Belgium) Laurens Vanthoor | (Netherlands) Van Amersfoort Racing | T: (Ukraine) Sergey Chukanov; R: (Germany) Markus Pommer |
| 2 | R2 | Nürburgring | 23 May | (Switzerland) Rahel Frey | (Netherlands) Stef Dusseldorp | (Switzerland) Rahel Frey | (Switzerland) Jo Zeller Racing | T: (Ukraine) Sergey Chukanov; R: (Germany) Nico Monien |
| 3 | R1 | Hockenheimring | 6 June | (Brazil) Rafael Suzuki | (Netherlands) Stef Dusseldorp | (Netherlands) Stef Dusseldorp | (Netherlands) Van Amersfoort Racing | T: (Ukraine) Sergey Chukanov; R: (Netherlands) Stef Dusseldorp |
| 3 | R2 | Hockenheimring | 7 June | (Belgium) Laurens Vanthoor | (Netherlands) Stef Dusseldorp | (Belgium) Laurens Vanthoor | (Netherlands) Van Amersfoort Racing | T: (Ukraine) Sergey Chukanov; R: (Netherlands) Stef Dusseldorp |
| 4 | R1 | Oschersleben | 20 June | (Netherlands) Stef Dusseldorp | (Belgium) Laurens Vanthoor | (Belgium) Laurens Vanthoor | (Netherlands) Van Amersfoort Racing | T: (Finland) Mika Vähämäki; R: (Germany) Markus Pommer |
| 4 | R2 | Oschersleben | 21 June | (Belgium) Laurens Vanthoor | (Belgium) Laurens Vanthoor | (Belgium) Laurens Vanthoor | (Netherlands) Van Amersfoort Racing | T: (Finland) Jesse Krohn; R: (Germany) Nico Monien |
| 5 | R1 | EuroSpeedway Lausitz | 4 July | (Belgium) Laurens Vanthoor | (Belgium) Laurens Vanthoor | (Belgium) Laurens Vanthoor | (Netherlands) Van Amersfoort Racing | T: (Ukraine) Sergey Chukanov; R: (Germany) Nico Monien |
| 5 | R2 | EuroSpeedway Lausitz | 5 July | (Belgium) Laurens Vanthoor | (Belgium) Laurens Vanthoor | (Germany) Nico Monien | (Germany) Zettl Sportsline Motorsport | T: (Ukraine) Sergey Chukanov; R: (Germany) Nico Monien |
| 6 | R1 | TT Circuit Assen | 8 August | (Belgium) Laurens Vanthoor | (Belgium) Laurens Vanthoor | (Belgium) Laurens Vanthoor | (Netherlands) Van Amersfoort Racing | T: (Ukraine) Sergey Chukanov; R: (Netherlands) Stef Dusseldorp |
| 6 | R2 | TT Circuit Assen | 9 August | (Belgium) Laurens Vanthoor | (Belgium) Laurens Vanthoor | (Belgium) Laurens Vanthoor | (Netherlands) Van Amersfoort Racing | T: (Ukraine) Sergey Chukanov; R: (Netherlands) Stef Dusseldorp |
| 7 | R1 | Nürburgring | 21 August | (Belgium) Laurens Vanthoor | (Belgium) Laurens Vanthoor | (Belgium) Laurens Vanthoor | (Netherlands) Van Amersfoort Racing | T: (Ukraine) Sergey Chukanov; R: (Netherlands) Stef Dusseldorp |
| 7 | R2 | Nürburgring | 22 August | (France) Tom Dillmann | (France) Tom Dillmann | (France) Tom Dillmann | (Austria) Neuhauser Racing | T: (Finland) Jesse Krohn; R: (Netherlands) Stef Dusseldorp |
| 8 | R1 | Sachsenring | 19 September | (France) Tom Dillmann | (France) Tom Dillmann | (France) Tom Dillmann | (Austria) Neuhauser Racing | T: (Ukraine) Sergey Chukanov; R: (Netherlands) Stef Dusseldorp |
| 8 | R2 | Sachsenring | 20 September | (Belgium) Laurens Vanthoor | (Belgium) Laurens Vanthoor | (Belgium) Laurens Vanthoor | (Netherlands) Van Amersfoort Racing | T: (Ukraine) Sergey Chukanov; R: (Netherlands) Stef Dusseldorp |
| 9 | R1 | Oschersleben | 17 October | (Germany) Markus Pommer | (Germany) Nico Monien | (Belgium) Laurens Vanthoor | (Netherlands) Van Amersfoort Racing | T: (Finland) Jesse Krohn; R: (Germany) Markus Pommer |
| 9 | R2 | Oschersleben | 18 October | (France) Tom Dillmann | (Belgium) Laurens Vanthoor | (France) Tom Dillmann | (Austria) Neuhauser Racing | T: (Ukraine) Sergey Chukanov; R: (Netherlands) Stef Dusseldorp |

== Standings ==
=== ATS Formel 3 Cup ===
- Points are awarded as follows:

| 1 | 2 | 3 | 4 | 5 | 6 | 7 | 8 | PP | FL |
|---|---|---|---|---|---|---|---|---|---|
| 10 | 8 | 6 | 5 | 4 | 3 | 2 | 1 | **1** | 1 |

| Pos | Driver | OSC1 | | NÜR1 | | HOC | | OSC2 | | LAU | | ASS | | NÜR2 | | SAC | | OSC3 | | Pts |
|---|---|---|---|---|---|---|---|---|---|---|---|---|---|---|---|---|---|---|---|---|
| 1 | (Belgium) Laurens Vanthoor | **1** | **11** | **1** | 2 | 2 | **1** | 1 | **1** | **1** | **2** | **1** | **1** | **1** | 12 | Ret | **1** | 1 | 2 | 163 |
| 2 | (Netherlands) Stef Dusseldorp | 2 | 1 | Ret | 5 | 1 | 2 | **6** | 9 | 10 | 3 | 2 | 4 | 2 | 3 | 2 | 6 | 3 | 3 | 106 |
| 3 | (Germany) Markus Pommer | 6 | 7 | 5 | 8 | 4 | 5 | 2 | 5 | 6 | 4 | 11 | Ret | 4 | 8 | 5 | 8 | **2** | 4 | 67 |
| 4 | (Brazil) Rafael Suzuki | 4 | 3 | 4 | 7 | **Ret** | 4 | 4 | 3 | 2 | 6 | 4 | 3 | 6 | 6 | 9 | 10 | Ret | 13 | 65 |
| 5 | (Germany) Nico Monien | 17 | 8 | 7 | 3 | 12 | 3 | 3 | 2 | 3 | 1 | Ret | 6 | 16 | 5 | 10 | 7 | 6 | Ret | 61 |
| 6 | (France) Tom Dillmann | | | | | | | | | | | | | 3 | **1** | **1** | 3 | Ret | **1** | 49 |
| 7 | (Switzerland) Rahel Frey | 3 | 4 | 2 | **1** | 3 | 12 | 7 | 11 | 7 | 5 | | | | | | | | | 45 |
| 8 | (Austria) Bernd Herndlhofer | 7 | 2 | 3 | 4 | Ret | 9 | 10 | 4 | 5 | 7 | 9 | Ret | | | | | | | 32 |
| 9 | (Latvia) Harald Schlegelmilch | | | | | | | | | | | 6 | 2 | 7 | 4 | 3 | 4 | Ret | 10 | 30 |
| 10 | (Sweden) Max Nilsson | 8 | 5 | Ret | 6 | 7 | 7 | 9 | Ret | 4 | 8 | 3 | 8 | Ret | 10 | 8 | 9 | 9 | Ret | 30 |
| 11 | (Austria) Willi Steindl | Ret | 6 | 6 | 14 | 6 | 6 | 5 | 6 | 15 | 14 | Ret | 12 | 10 | 14 | | | | | 19 |
| 12 | (France) Nicolas Marroc | Ret | 13 | 8 | 20 | 8 | 11 | 11 | 7 | 13 | 11 | 18 | 7 | 23† | 16 | Ret | Ret | 5 | 6 | 14 |
| 13 | (Ukraine) Sergey Chukanov | 10 | 15 | 12 | 11 | 10 | 14 | 21 | 17 | 12 | 9 | 5 | 9 | 8 | 17 | 7 | 13 | Ret | 5 | 12 |
| 14 | (Luxembourg) Gary Hauser | 18 | 9 | 11 | 10 | 5 | 15 | 13 | 16 | 11 | 17 | 13 | 10 | 5 | 13 | 13 | Ret | 8 | 8 | 12 |
| 15 | (Germany) Tim Sandtler | | | | | | | | | | | | | 12 | 2 | | | | | 8 |
| 16 | (China) Adderly Fong | 9 | 14 | 9 | 9 | 17 | 10 | 14 | Ret | 8 | 18 | 10 | 5 | 18 | 7 | 11 | 12 | 11 | Ret | 7 |
| 17 | (Austria) Marco Oberhauser | 5 | 19 | 10 | 13 | 9 | 8 | 8 | Ret | Ret | 12 | 8 | Ret | 11 | 19 | 15 | 11 | Ret | Ret | 7 |
| 18 | (Luxembourg) David Hauser | Ret | DNS | Ret | 12 | | | 15 | 13 | 9 | 10 | 16 | 11 | 14 | 24† | 6 | Ret | 18 | 9 | 5 |
| 19 | (Finland) Jesse Krohn | | | | | | | 19 | 10 | | | 7 | Ret | 9 | 9 | | | 7 | 17 | 5 |
| 20 | (Netherlands) Shirley van der Lof | 11 | 12 | Ret | 15 | Ret | 13 | 12 | 8 | DNS | DNS | 14 | 14 | 13 | 15 | 14 | Ret | 15 | 14 | 1 |
| 21 | (Russia) Vladimir Semenov | 12 | 10 | 16 | 16 | Ret | Ret | 17 | DNS | Ret | 16 | 12 | 13 | 15 | 11 | Ret | Ret | 16 | 11 | 0 |
| 22 | (Germany) Francesco Lopez | 13 | 16 | 14 | 18 | 11 | 18 | 20 | 15 | 16 | 20 | 17 | 15 | 20 | 21 | | | | | 0 |
| 23 | (Finland) Mika Vähämäki | 14 | 17 | 13 | 17 | 15 | Ret | 18 | 14 | 18† | 15 | 15 | 16 | 19 | 20 | 12 | 14 | 12 | 20† | 0 |
| 24 | (Indonesia) Zahir Ali | | | | | | | 16 | 12 | 14 | 13 | 20 | Ret | 17 | 18 | | | | | 0 |
| 25 | (Switzerland) Urs Rüttimann | | | | | 13 | 17 | | | | | | | | | | | 19 | 19 | 0 |
| 26 | (Germany) Dominik Schraml | | | Ret | Ret | 14 | 16 | | | | | | | | | | | | | 0 |
| 27 | (Italy) Luca Iannaccone | 19 | 21 | 15 | 19 | 18 | 20 | 22 | Ret | 17 | 19 | 19 | 17 | 22 | 23 | 16 | 15 | 20 | 22 | 0 |
| 28 | (Russia) Viktor Shaytar | 15 | 18 | | | | | | | | | | | | | | | | | 0 |
| 29 | (Germany) Stefan Neuburger | | | | | 16 | 19 | | | | | | | | | | | | | 0 |
| 30 | (Russia) Nikolay Martsenko | 16 | 20 | | | | | | | | | | | | | | | Ret | 16 | 0 |
| 31 | (Luxembourg) Louis Wagner | | | | | | | | | | | | | 21 | 22 | | | | | 0 |
guest drivers ineligible for points
| | (Germany) Peter Elkmann | | | | | | | | | | | | | | | Ret | 2 | | | 0 |
| | (United Kingdom) Joey Foster | | | | | | | | | | | | | | | 4 | 5 | 4 | 15 | 0 |
| | (Germany) Daniel Abt | | | | | | | | | | | | | | | | | 17 | 7 | 0 |
| | (India) Armaan Ebrahim | | | | | | | | | | | | | | | | | 10 | 12 | 0 |
| | (Finland) Marko Vähämäki | | | | | | | | | | | | | | | | | 13 | 21† | 0 |
| | (Slovakia) Nikolas Kvasai | | | | | | | | | | | | | | | | | 14 | Ret | 0 |
| | (Switzerland) Sandro Zeller | | | | | | | | | | | | | | | | | Ret | 18 | 0 |
| Pos | Driver | OSC1 | | NÜR1 | | HOC | | OSC2 | | LAU | | ASS | | NÜR2 | | SAC | | OSC3 | | Pts |

| Colour | Result |
|---|---|
| Gold | Winner |
| Silver | Second place |
| Bronze | Third place |
| Green | Points classification |
| Blue | Non-points classification |
| Blue | Non-classified finish (NC) |
| Purple | Retired, not classified (Ret) |
| Red | Did not qualify (DNQ) |
| Red | Did not pre-qualify (DNPQ) |
| Black | Disqualified (DSQ) |
| White | Did not start (DNS) |
| White | Withdrew (WD) |
| White | Race cancelled (C) |
| Blank | Did not practice (DNP) |
| Blank | Did not arrive (DNA) |
| Blank | Excluded (EX) |

**Bold** – Pole
Italics – Fastest Lap

- † — Drivers did not finish the race, but were classified as they completed over 90% of the race distance.

=== ATS Formel 3 Trophy ===
- Points are awarded for both races as follows:

| Pos | 1 | 2 | 3 | 4 | 5 | 6 | 7 | 8 |
|---|---|---|---|---|---|---|---|---|
| Points | 10 | 8 | 6 | 5 | 4 | 3 | 2 | 1 |

| Pos | Driver | OSC1 | | NÜR1 | | HOC | | OSC2 | | LAU | | ASS | | NÜR2 | | SAC | | OSC3 | | Pts |
|---|---|---|---|---|---|---|---|---|---|---|---|---|---|---|---|---|---|---|---|---|
| 1 | (Ukraine) Sergey Chukanov | 1 | 1 | 1 | 1 | 1 | 1 | 4 | 4 | 1 | 1 | 1 | 1 | 1 | 2 | 1 | 1 | Ret | 1 | 158 |
| 2 | (Finland) Mika Vähämäki | 3 | 3 | 2 | 2 | 5 | Ret | 1 | 2 | 4† | 2 | 3 | 3 | 3 | 3 | 2 | 2 | 2 | 5† | 115 |
| 3 | (Germany) Francesco Lopez | 2 | 2 | 3 | 3 | 2 | 4 | 3 | 3 | 2 | 4 | 4 | 2 | 4 | 4 | | | | | 89 |
| 4 | (Italy) Luca Iannaccone | 6 | 6 | 4 | 4 | 7 | 6 | 5 | Ret | 3 | 3 | 5 | 4 | 5 | 5 | 3 | 3 | 6 | 7 | 74 |
| 5 | (Finland) Jesse Krohn | | | | | | | 2 | 1 | | | 2 | Ret | 2 | 1 | | | 1 | 3 | 60 |
| 7 | (Switzerland) Urs Rüttimann | | | | | 3 | 3 | | | | | | | | | | | 5 | 4 | 23 |
| 7 | (Russia) Nikolay Martsenko | 5 | 5 | | | | | | | | | | | | | | | Ret | 2 | 16 |
| 8 | (Germany) Dominik Schraml | | | Ret | Ret | 4 | 2 | | | | | | | | | | | | | 13 |
| 9 | (Russia) Viktor Shaytar | 4 | 4 | | | | | | | | | | | | | | | | | 10 |
| 10 | (Germany) Stefan Neuburger | | | | | 6 | 5 | | | | | | | | | | | | | 7 |
guest drivers ineligible for points
| | (Finland) Marko Vähämäki | | | | | | | | | | | | | | | | | 3 | 6† | 0 |
| | (Slovakia) Nikolas Kvasai | | | | | | | | | | | | | | | | | 4 | Ret | 0 |
| Pos | Driver | OSC1 | | NÜR1 | | HOC | | OSC2 | | LAU | | ASS | | NÜR2 | | SAC | | OSC3 | | Pts |

| Colour | Result |
|---|---|
| Gold | Winner |
| Silver | Second place |
| Bronze | Third place |
| Green | Points classification |
| Blue | Non-points classification |
| Blue | Non-classified finish (NC) |
| Purple | Retired, not classified (Ret) |
| Red | Did not qualify (DNQ) |
| Red | Did not pre-qualify (DNPQ) |
| Black | Disqualified (DSQ) |
| White | Did not start (DNS) |
| White | Withdrew (WD) |
| White | Race cancelled (C) |
| Blank | Did not practice (DNP) |
| Blank | Did not arrive (DNA) |
| Blank | Excluded (EX) |

- † — Drivers did not finish the race, but were classified as they completed over 90% of the race distance.

=== ATS Formel 3 Junior-Pokal (Rookie) ===
- Points are awarded for both races as follows:

| Pos | 1 | 2 | 3 | 4 | 5 | 6 | 7 | 8 |
|---|---|---|---|---|---|---|---|---|
| Points | 10 | 8 | 6 | 5 | 4 | 3 | 2 | 1 |

| Pos | Driver | OSC1 | | NÜR1 | | HOC | | OSC2 | | LAU | | ASS | | NÜR2 | | SAC | | OSC3 | | Pts |
|---|---|---|---|---|---|---|---|---|---|---|---|---|---|---|---|---|---|---|---|---|
| 1 | (Netherlands) Stef Dusseldorp | 1 | 1 | Ret | 2 | 1 | 1 | 4 | 5 | 3 | 2 | 1 | 1 | 1 | 1 | 1 | 1 | 2 | 1 | 149 |
| 2 | (Germany) Markus Pommer | 2 | 3 | 1 | 3 | 2 | 3 | 1 | 2 | 2 | 3 | 2 | Ret | 2 | 3 | 2 | 3 | 1 | 2 | 130 |
| 3 | (Germany) Nico Monien | 7 | 4 | 3 | 1 | 5 | 2 | 2 | 1 | 1 | 1 | Ret | 2 | 5 | 2 | 3 | 2 | 4 | Ret | 112 |
| 4 | (Austria) Willi Steindl | Ret | 2 | 2 | 4 | 3 | 4 | 3 | 3 | 5 | 5 | Ret | 4 | 3 | 5 | | | | | 67 |
| 5 | (France) Nicolas Marroc | Ret | 6 | 4 | 7 | 4 | 5 | 5 | 4 | 4 | 4 | 5 | 3 | 7 | 6 | Ret | Ret | 3 | 3 | 65 |
| 6 | (Finland) Mika Vähämäki | 4 | 7 | 5 | 6 | 6 | Ret | 7 | 6 | 6† | 6 | 4 | 6 | 6 | 7 | 4 | 4 | 5 | 8† | 58 |
| 7 | (Russia) Vladimir Semenov | 3 | 5 | 6 | 5 | Ret | Ret | 6 | DNS | Ret | 7 | 3 | 5 | 4 | 4 | Ret | Ret | 7 | 5 | 50 |
| 8 | (Russia) Nikolay Martsenko | 6 | 9 | | | | | | | | | | | | | | | Ret | 6 | 7 |
| 9 | (Russia) Viktor Shaitar | 5 | 8 | | | | | | | | | | | | | | | | | 5 |
guest drivers ineligible for points
| | (Germany) Daniel Abt | | | | | | | | | | | | | | | | | 7 | 4 | 0 |
| | (Finland) Marko Vähämäki | | | | | | | | | | | | | | | | | 6 | 9† | 0 |
| | (Switzerland) Sandro Zeller | | | | | | | | | | | | | | | | | Ret | 7 | 0 |
| Pos | Driver | OSC1 | | NÜR1 | | HOC | | OSC2 | | LAU | | ASS | | NÜR2 | | SAC | | OSC3 | | Pts |

| Colour | Result |
|---|---|
| Gold | Winner |
| Silver | Second place |
| Bronze | Third place |
| Green | Points classification |
| Blue | Non-points classification |
| Blue | Non-classified finish (NC) |
| Purple | Retired, not classified (Ret) |
| Red | Did not qualify (DNQ) |
| Red | Did not pre-qualify (DNPQ) |
| Black | Disqualified (DSQ) |
| White | Did not start (DNS) |
| White | Withdrew (WD) |
| White | Race cancelled (C) |
| Blank | Did not practice (DNP) |
| Blank | Did not arrive (DNA) |
| Blank | Excluded (EX) |

=== ATS Formel 3 Speed-Pokal ===
- Points are awarded for both races as follows:

| PP | FL |
|---|---|
| **1** | 1 |

| Pos | Driver | OSC1 | | NÜR1 | | HOC | | OSC2 | | LAU | | ASS | | NÜR2 | | SAC | | OSC3 | | Pts |
|---|---|---|---|---|---|---|---|---|---|---|---|---|---|---|---|---|---|---|---|---|
| 1 | (Belgium) Laurens Vanthoor | **P** FL | **P** | **P** | | | **P** | FL | **P** FL | **P** FL | **P** FL | **P** FL | **P** FL | **P** FL | | | **P** FL | | FL | 21 |
| 2 | (Netherlands) Stef Dusseldorp | | FL | | FL | FL | FL | **P** | | | | | | | | | | | | 5 |
| 3 | (France) Tom Dillmann | | | | | | | | | | | | | | **P** FL | **P** FL | | | **P** | 5 |
| 4 | (Switzerland) Rahel Frey | | | FL | **P** | | | | | | | | | | | | | | | 2 |
| 5 | (Brazil) Rafael Suzuki | | | | | **P** | | | | | | | | | | | | | | 1 |
| 6 | (Germany) Markus Pommer | | | | | | | | | | | | | | | | | **P** | | 1 |
| 7 | (Germany) Nico Monien | | | | | | | | | | | | | | | | | FL | | 1 |
| Pos | Driver | OSC1 | | NÜR1 | | HOC | | OSC2 | | LAU | | ASS | | NÜR2 | | SAC | | OSC3 | | Pts |
