= Markus Pommer =

German racing driver

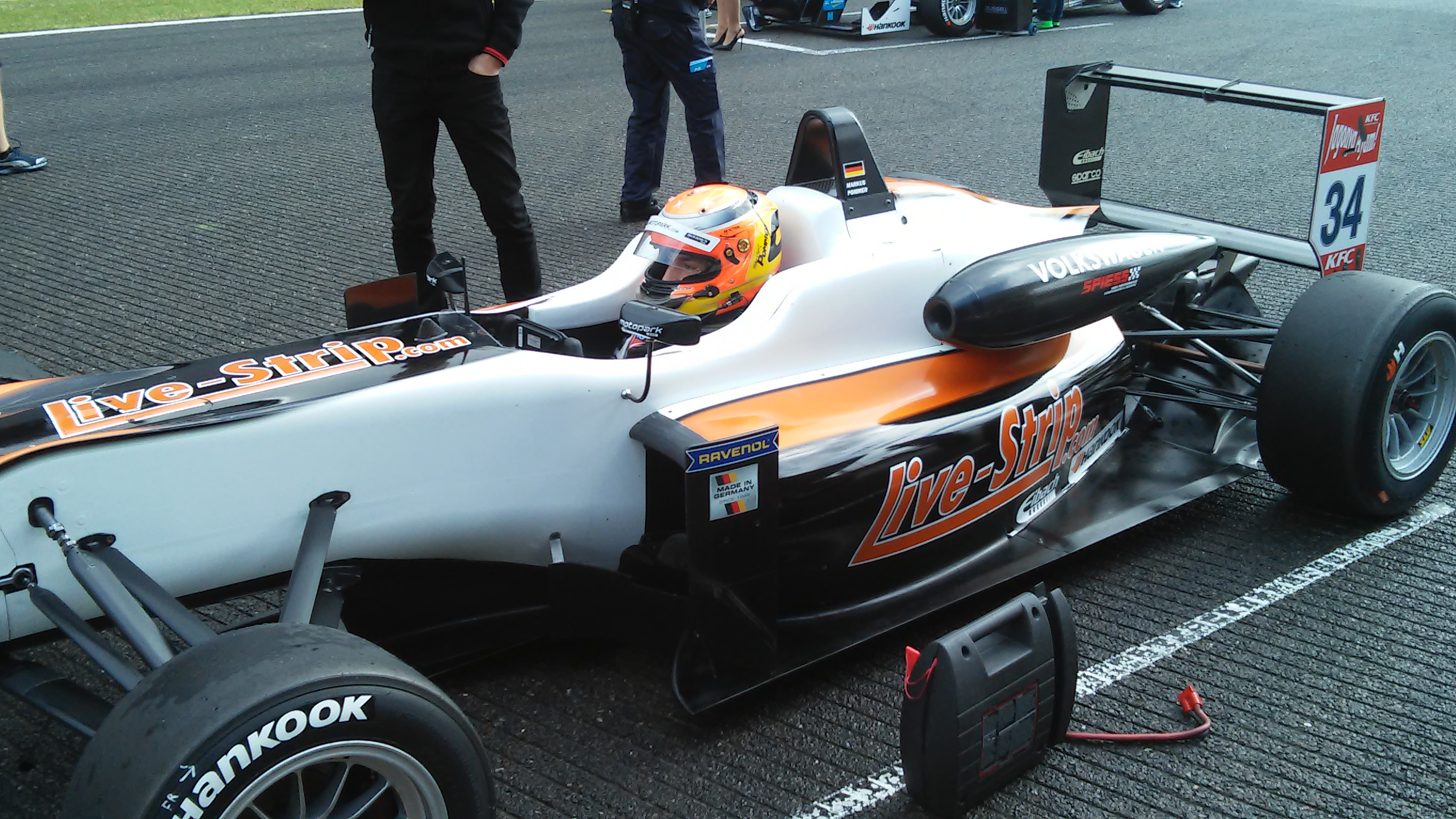
- Markus Pommer on the F3 grid at Spa-Francorchamps 2015.
- Nationality: (Germany) German
- Born: 27 January 1991 (age 35) Heilbronn (Germany)

FIA Formula 3 European Championship career
- Debut season: 2015
- Current team: Motopark
- Categorisation: FIA Gold (until 2016); FIA Silver (2017–)
- Car number: 34
- Starts: 33
- Wins: 1
- Poles: 0
- Fastest laps: 1
- Best finish: 9th in 2015

Previous series
- 2014 2009-11, 14 2013 2012 2008 2007: Auto GP; German Formula Three; Porsche Supercup; FIA Formula Two Championship; ADAC Formel Masters; Formula BMW ADAC

Championship titles
- 2024 2023 2014: Prototype Cup Germany; Prototype Cup Germany; German Formula Three

Markus Pommer (German: [ˈmaʁkʊs ˈpɔmɐ]; born 27 January 1991) is a German racing driver.

== Career ==
Born in Heilbronn, Pommer began his racing career in karting 1999. He remained in karting until 2006. Amongst others, he won 2004 the Southern German ADAC Kart Cup – ICA Junior. 2007 he began his formula racing career. He competed in the Formula BMW ADAC for Mücke Motorsport. He concluded the season behind his teammates Philipp Eng and Kevin Mirocha on the tenth position in the championship. After the fusion of the Formula BMW ADAC and the Formula BMW UK to the Formula BMW Europe, Pommer switched to Abt Sportsline in the ADAC Formel Masters 2008. Pommer won one race and finished five times on the podium. He finished the season in front of his teammate Daniel Abt on the fifth position in the championship.

In 2009, Pommer started in the German Formula Three Championship for Zettl Sportsline Motorsport. He won no races and scored two second place as his best results. He concluded the season behind Laurens Vanthoor and Stef Dusseldorp on the third position. Pommer was the best driver with an engine of Mercedes. In 2010, he remained in the German Formula Three Championship. He drove for Brandl Motorsport in this season. With a second place as his best result, he remained without a race win. He finished eighth in the championship and became the best driver with a Mercedes engine for the second time. In 2011, he competed in his third season in the German Formula Three Championship. He started for Motopark Academy first. After he had scored only one point out of the first three rounds, he switched to Jo Zeller Racing. In his second race, he already achieved the first podium position with a second place. After the fourth round, he was on the tenth position in the championship.

== Prototype Cup Germany ==
Following a pair of seasons racing in the European Le Mans Series, Pommer would pair up with Gary Hauser in 2023, driving for Racing Experience in the Prototype Cup Germany. A win and a second place during the season opener in Hockenheim pulled the pair into the championship battle, which they would remain in over the coming rounds, with another pair of podiums coming at Oschersleben. The round at Norisring heralded further success, as Pommer and Hauser took another victory to extend their advantage. At the penultimate round in Assen, the duo won on Saturday, with Pommer having taken pole position and set the fastest lap, before a second place on Sunday ended up being enough to prematurely clinch the title. The season ended with one further win at the Nürburgring, as Pommer repeated his qualifying performance from the previous round.

== Karting record ==
=== Karting career summary ===
Season	Series	Team	Position
2003	ADAC Kart Cup - Bambini A		2nd
2004	German Karting Championship - Junior		14th
2004	Southern German ADAC Kart Cup - ICA Junior		1st
2005	German Karting Championship - Junior		19th
2005	Southern German ADAC Kart Cup - ICA Junior		8th
2006	Andrea Margutti Trophy - ICA		27th
2011	24 Hours of Leipzig	Formel Gloria by Motorsport XL	6th

== Racing record ==
=== Racing career summary ===
Season	Series	Team	Races	Wins	Poles	FLaps	Podiums	Points	Position
2007	Formula BMW ADAC	ADAC Berlin-Brandenburg	18	0	0	0	0	336	10th
2008	ADAC Formel Masters	Team Abt Sportsline	16	1	1	0	5	108	5th
2009	German Formula 3 Championship	Zettl Sportsline Motorsport	18	0	1	0	2	67	**3rd**
2010	German Formula 3 Championship	Brandl Motorsport	18	0	0	0	2	40	8th
2011	German Formula 3 Championship	Motopark	17	0	1	2	4	52	7th
2012	FIA Formula Two Championship	MotorSport Vision	16	3	4	2	5	169	4th
2013	Porsche Supercup	Lechner Racing Academy	9	0	0	0	0	25	15th
2014	German Formula 3 Championship	Lotus	23	14	11	10	17	424	**1st**
2014	Auto GP	Super Nova International	16	2	4	4	7	179	**3rd**
2015	FIA Formula 3 European Championship	Motopark	33	1	0	1	2	116.5	9th
2015	Masters of Formula 3	Motopark	1	0	0	0	0	N/A	18th
2015	Macau Grand Prix	Motopark	1	0	0	0	0	N/A	5th
2016	Blancpain GT Series Sprint Cup	Phoenix Racing	6	0	0	0	0	0	NC
2016	ADAC GT Masters	Phoenix Racing	8	0	0	1	0	30	25th
2016	ADAC GT Masters	Aust Motorsport	4	0	0	0	0	30	25th
2016	ADAC GT Masters	HB Racing WDS Bau	2	0	0	0	0	30	25th
2017	ADAC GT Masters	Aust Motorsport	12	1	0	0	2	87	10th
2017	FIA GT World Cup	Aust Motorsport	0	0	0	0	0	N/A	DNS
2018	ADAC GT Masters	MANN-FILTER Team HTP Motorsport	14	1	2	1	4	117	4th
2018	Blancpain GT Series Asia	GruppeM Racing Team	4	1	1	0	2	50	14th
2019	ADAC GT Masters	Callaway Competition	14	3	1	2	3	105	8th
2019	24H GT Series - A6	Car Collection Motorsport							
2020	ADAC GT Masters	Callaway Competition	14	1	0	0	1	61	15th
2021	European Le Mans Series - LMP2	BHK Motorsport	6	0	0	0	0	6	27th
2021	Le Mans Cup - LMP3	Mühlner Motorsport	2	0	0	0	0	0.5	40th
2022	European Le Mans Series - LMP2	BHK Motorsport	6	0	0	0	0	0	25th
2023	Prototype Cup Germany	Racing Experience	12	4	2	2	9	223	**1st**
2024	Prototype Cup Germany	Gebhardt Motorsport	12	3	2	0	10	206	**1st**
2024	IMSA VP Racing SportsCar Challenge - LMP3	Gebhardt Intralogistics Motorsports	2	0	0	0	1	600	14th
2025	IMSA VP Racing SportsCar Challenge - LMP3	Gebhardt Motorsport	2	0	0	0	2	620	10th
2025	Le Mans Cup - LMP3	ANS Motorsport	7	0	0	0	0	12	16th
2026	Prototype Cup Europe	BWT Mücke Motorsport	8	0	1	0	0	68	8th

^{*} Season still in progress.

=== Complete Formula BMW ADAC results ===
(key) (Races in bold indicate pole position) (Races in italics indicate fastest lap)

Year	Entrant	1	2	3	4	5	6	7	8	9	10	11	12	13	14	15	16	17	18	DC	Points
2007	ADAC Berlin-Brandenburg	OSC1; 1 Ret	OSC1; 2; 14†	LAU; 1; 10	LAU; 2; 12	NOR; 1; 10	NOR; 2; 12	NÜR1; 1; 6	NÜR1; 2; 15	ZAN; 1; 10	ZAN; 2 Ret	OSC2; 1; 12	OSC2; 2; 11	NÜR2; 1; 11	NÜR2; 2; 10	CAT; 1; 9	CAT; 2; 7	HOC; 1; 7	HOC; 2; 12	10th	336

=== Complete ADAC Formel Masters results ===
(key) (Races in bold indicate pole position) (Races in italics indicate fastest lap)

Year	Team	1	2	3	4	5	6	7	8	9	10	11	12	13	14	15	16	Pos	Points
2008	Team Abt Sportsline	OSC1; 1; 3	OSC1; 2; 3	NÜR1; 1; 5	NÜR1; 2; 9	ASS; 1; 6	ASS; 2 Ret	NÜR2; 1; 1	**NÜR2**; **2**; 15	LAU; 1 Ret	LAU; 2; 9	SAC; 1; 3	SAC; 2; 7	OSC2; 1; 5	OSC2; 2; 7	HOC; 1; 2	HOC; 2 Ret	5th	108

=== Complete ATS Formel 3 Cup results ===
(key) (Races in bold indicate pole position) (Races in italics indicate fastest lap)

Year	Entrant	Chassis	Engine	1	2	3	4	5	6	7	8	9	10	11	12	13	14	15	16	17	18	19	20	21	22	23	24	Pos	Points
2009	Zettl Sportsline Motorsport	Dallara F306	Mercedes	OSC1; 1; 6	OSC1; 2; 7	NÜR1; 1; 5	NÜR1; 2; 8	HOC; 1; 4	HOC; 2; 5	OSC2; 1; 2	OSC2; 2; 5	LAU; 1; 6	LAU; 2; 4	ASS; 1; 11	ASS; 2 Ret	NÜR2; 1; 4	NÜR2; 2; 8	SAC; 1; 5	SAC; 2; 8	**OSC3**; **1**; 2	OSC3; 2; 4							3rd	67
2010	Brandl Motorsport	Dallara F306	Mercedes	OSC1; 1; 5	OSC1; 2; 6	SAC; 1; 10	SAC; 2; 8	HOC; 1; 8	HOC; 2 Ret	ASS1; 1; 6	ASS1; 2; 7	NÜR1; 1; 6	NÜR1; 2; 8	ASS2; 1; 7	ASS2; 2; 2	LAU; 1; 20†	LAU; 2; 3	NÜR2; 1; 11	NÜR2; 2; 13	OSC2; 1; 6	OSC2; 2; 7							8th	40
2011	Motopark	Dallara F306	Volkswagen	OSC; 1; 12	OSC; 2 DNS	SPA; 1 Ret	SPA; 2; 11	SAC; 1; 9	SAC; 2; 8	ASS1; 1; 10	ASS1; 2; 2	ZOL; 1; 5	ZOL; 2; 4	RBR; 1; 7	RBR; 2; 5	LAU; 1; 9	LAU; 2; 5	ASS2; 1; 8	ASS2; 2; 2	**HOC**; **1**; 3	HOC; 2; 3							7th	52
2014	Lotus	Dallara F311	Volkswagen	**OSC**; **1**; 1	OSC; 2; 4	OSC; 2; 1	**LAU1**; **1**; 4	LAU1; 2; 1	**LAU1**; **3**; 1	**RBR**; **1**; 1	RBR; 2; 3	**RBR**; **3**; 1	HOC1; 1; 2	HOC1; 2 Ret	**HOC1**; **3**; 1	**NÜR**; **1**; 1	NÜR; 2; 7	**NÜR**; **3**; 1	**LAU2**; **1**; 1	LAU2; 2 C	**LAU2**; **3**; 1	**SAC**; **1**; 1	SAC; 2; 3	SAC; 3; 1	HOC2; 1; 4	HOC2; 2; 1	HOC2; 3; 12†	1st	424

=== Complete FIA Formula Two Championship results ===
(key) (Races in bold indicate pole position) (Races in italics indicate fastest lap)

Year	1	2	3	4	5	6	7	8	9	10	11	12	13	14	15	16	Pos	Points
2012	SIL; 1; 8	SIL; 2; 7	ALG; 1; 4	ALG; 2; 3	NÜR; 1; 9	NÜR; 2; 4	**SPA**; **1**; 1	SPA; 2; 2	BRH; 1; 5	BRH; 2; 5	LEC; 1; 5	**LEC**; **2**; 1	HUN; 1 NC	**HUN**; **2**; 1	MNZ; 1; 8	**MNZ**; **2**; 14	4th	169

=== Complete Porsche Supercup results ===
(key) (Races in bold indicate pole position) (Races in italics indicate fastest lap)

Year	Team	1	2	3	4	5	6	7	8	9	DC	Points
2013	Lechner Racing Academy	ESP; 19	MON; 17	GBR; 14	GER; 16	HUN; 7	BEL; 20	ITA; 22	UAE; 12	UAE; 13	15th	25

=== Complete Auto GP results ===
(key) (Races in bold indicate pole position) (Races in italics indicate fastest lap)

Year	Entrant	1	2	3	4	5	6	7	8	9	10	11	12	13	14	15	16	Pos	Points
2014	Super Nova International	MAR; 1; 8	MAR; 2; 1	LEC; 1; 2	LEC; 2; 4	**HUN**; **1**; 9	HUN; 2; 6	**MNZ**; **1**; 1	MNZ; 2; 3	**IMO**; **1** Ret	IMO; 2; 5	RBR; 1; 5	RBR; 2 Ret	**NÜR**; **1**; 3	NÜR; 2; 2	EST; 1; 3	EST; 2; 5	3rd	180

=== Complete FIA Formula 3 European Championship results ===
(key) (Races in bold indicate pole position) (Races in italics indicate fastest lap)

Year	Entrant	Engine	1	2	3	4	5	6	7	8	9	10	11	12	13	14	15	16	17	18	19	20	21	22	23	24	25	26	27	28	29	30	31	32	33	DC	Points
2015	Motopark	Volkswagen	SIL; 1; 5	SIL; 2 Ret	SIL; 3; 7	HOC; 1 DSQ	HOC; 2; 17	HOC; 3; 7	PAU; 1; 23	PAU; 2; 8	PAU; 3; 20	MNZ; 1 Ret	MNZ; 2; 8	MNZ; 3; 10	SPA; 1; 19	SPA; 2; 28	SPA; 3 DSQ	NOR; 1; 9	NOR; 2; 11	NOR; 3; 12	ZAN; 1; 3	ZAN; 2; 21	ZAN; 3; 1	RBR; 1; 17	RBR; 2; 6	RBR; 3; 4	ALG; 1; 5	ALG; 2; 11	ALG; 3 Ret	NÜR; 1; 6	NÜR; 2; 13	NÜR; 3; 6	HOC; 1; 9	HOC; 2; 9	HOC; 3; 22	9th	116.5

=== Complete Blancpain GT Series Sprint Cup results ===
Year	Team	Car	Class	1	2	3	4	5	6	7	8	9	10	Pos.	Points
2016	Phoenix Racing	Audi R8 LMS	Silver	MIS; QR; 19	MIS; CR; 15	BRH; QR; 19	BRH; CR; Ret	NÜR; QR; 20	NÜR; CR; 15	HUN; QR	HUN; CR	CAT; QR	CAT; CR	5th	61

=== Complete ADAC GT Masters results ===
(key) (Races in bold indicate pole position) (Races in italics indicate fastest lap)

Year	Team	Car	1	2	3	4	5	6	7	8	9	10	11	12	13	14	Pos	Points
2016	Phoenix Racing	R8 LMS	OSC; 1; 6	OSC; 2; 7	SAC; 1; 6	SAC; 2; 12	LAU; 1; 31	LAU; 2; 13	RBR; 1 Ret	RBR; 2; 15							25th	30
2016	Aust Motorsport	R8 LMS									NÜR; 1; 6	NÜR; 2; 21	ZAN; 1; 17	ZAN; 2; 20			25th	30
2016	HB Racing WDS Bau	Lamborghini Huracán GT3													HOC; 1 Ret	HOC; 2; 11	25th	30
2017	Aust Motorsport	Audi R8 LMS Evo	OSC; 1; 4	OSC; 2; 9	LAU; 1; 6	LAU; 2; 7	RBR; 1; 9	RBR; 2; 21	ZAN; 1; 2	ZAN; 2 Ret	NÜR; 1; 6	NÜR; 2; 1	SAC; 1	SAC; 2	HOC; 1; 7	HOC; 2; 20	10th	87
2018	Mann-Filter Team HTP	Mercedes-AMG GT3	OSC; 1; 9	OSC; 2; 5	MST; 1 Ret	**MST**; **2**; 1	RBR; 1; 18	RBR; 2; 3	NÜR; 1; 3	NÜR; 2; 2	ZAN; 1; 6	ZAN; 2; 4	SAC; 1 Ret	SAC; 2; 15	HOC; 1; 4	**HOC**; **2** Ret	4th	117
2019	Callaway Competition	Corvette C7 GT3-R	OSC; 1; 1	OSC; 2; 12	MST; 1; 19	MST; 2; 1	RBR; 1; 5	**RBR**; **2**; 1	ZAN; 1; 24	ZAN; 2; 20	NÜR; 1; 12	NÜR; 2; 7	HOC; 1 Ret	HOC; 2 Ret	SAC; 1; 23	SAC; 2; 19	8th	105
2020	Callaway Competition	Corvette C7 GT3-R	LAU1; 1 Ret	LAU1; 2; 12	NÜR; 1 Ret	NÜR; 2; 5	HOC; 1 Ret	HOC; 2 Ret	SAC; 1; 8	SAC; 2; 1	RBR; 1; 21	RBR; 2; 18	LAU2; 1; 8	LAU2; 2; 18	OSC; 1; 13	OSC; 2; 14	15th	61

=== Complete European Le Mans Series results ===
(key) (Races in bold indicate pole position; results in italics indicate fastest lap)

Year	Entrant	Class	Chassis	Engine	1	2	3	4	5	6	Rank	Points
2021	BHK Motorsport	LMP2	Oreca 07	Gibson GK428 4.2 L V8	CAT; 13	RBR; 15	LEC; 11	MNZ; 18	SPA; 9	ALG; 9	27th	6
2022	BHK Motorsport	LMP2	Oreca 07	Gibson GK428 4.2 L V8	LEC; 14	IMO; 16	MNZ; 14	CAT; 15	SPA; 13	ALG; 12	25th	0

=== Complete Le Mans Cup results ===
(key) (Races in bold indicate pole position; results in italics indicate fastest lap)

Year	Entrant	Class	Chassis	1	2	3	4	5	6	7	Rank	Points
2021	Mühlner Motorsport	LMP3	Duqueine M30 - D08	BAR; Ret	LEC; 12	MNZ	LMS	LMS	SPA	POR	40th	0.5
2025	ANS Motorsport	LMP3	Ligier JS P325	CAT; 13	LEC; 6	LMS; 1; 18	LMS; 2; 20	SPA; 8	SIL; 14	ALG; 14	16th	12

^{*} Season still in progress.

=== Complete Prototype Cup Germany results ===
(key) (Races in bold indicate pole position) (Races in italics indicate fastest lap)

Year	Team	Car	Engine	1	2	3	4	5	6	7	8	9	10	11	12	13	14	DC	Points
2023	Racing Experience	Duqueine M30 - D08	Nissan VK56DE 5.6 L V8	HOC; 1; 2	HOC; 2; 1	OSC; 1; 2	OSC; 2; 3	ZAN; 1; 5	ZAN; 2; 4	NOR; 1; 1	NOR; 2; 3	**ASS**; **1**; 1	ASS; 2; 2	**NÜR**; **1**; 1	NÜR; 2; 10			1st	223
2024	Gebhardt Motorsport	Duqueine M30 - D08	Nissan VK56DE 5.6 L V8	**SPA**; **1** C	SPA; 2 C	**LAU**; **1**; 1	LAU; 2; 3	LAU; 3; 2	ZAN; 1; 3	ZAN; 2; 5	HOC; 1 DNS	HOC; 2; 2	HOC; 3; 3	NÜR; 1; 4	NÜR; 2; 2	SAC; 1; 1	SAC; 2; 3	1st	206

Sporting positions
Preceded by Jimmy Eriksson	German Formula Three Champion; 2014	Succeeded by None (Series ended)
