= Alexander Tyuryumin =

Russian auto racing driver (born 1980)

Aleksander Vladimirovich Tyuryumin (Russian: Алекса́ндр Влади́мирович Тюрю́мин, IPA: [ɐlʲɪˈksandr vlɐˈdʲimʲɪrəvʲɪtɕ tʲʉˈrʲʉmʲɪn], born 20 March 1980 in Moscow) is a Russian auto racing driver. He had no karting experience in his childhood but at the age of 21 he showed good results in recreational karting and hence he decided to try racing. His racing debut happened in the Russian VW Polo cup. In his first season, he was on the podium three times, finished in fourth place overall the championship and first place among the novice racers.

Later, Tyuryumin participated in Russian Formula 3, Formula 1600, Formula RUS and the Lada Revolution series, winning the Formula 1600 Russian championship in 2003.

Outside Russia, Tyuryumin participated in European Formula Palmer Audi series with two second places and fourth overall position in the championship and also was a reserve driver in A1 GP series. He retired from racing after the 2005 season.

Tyuryumin's grandfather, Alexander Mikhailovich Tyuryumin, was an aviation test pilot for Ilyushin Design Bureau. He currently also lives in Moscow and holds the title of Hero of the soviet union and more than ten international world records.

Tyuryumin's last name is misspelled as Truryumin in several web sources.

== Racing career ==
Year	Series or championship	Team	Races	Wins	Poles	Podiums	Points	Pos.
2001	Russian VW Polo cup	NotaBene RS Competition Team	6	N/A	N/A	3	115	4
2001	Russian Formula 3	N/A	1	N/A	N/A	N/A	N/A	N/A
2002	Russian Formula 1600	N/A	N/A	1	N/A	N/A	N/A	N/A
2002	Formula RUS	N/A	1	1	N/A	1	N/A	N/A
2003	Russian Formula 1600	N/A	N/A	N/A	N/A	N/A	N/A	1
2003	Formula RUS	N/A	2	N/A	N/A	N/A	2	
2004	Formula Palmer Audi	—	12	0	0	5	151	4
2005	A1 GP	Russia	0	0	0	0	0	—
