= Nico Monien =

German racing driver (born 1990)

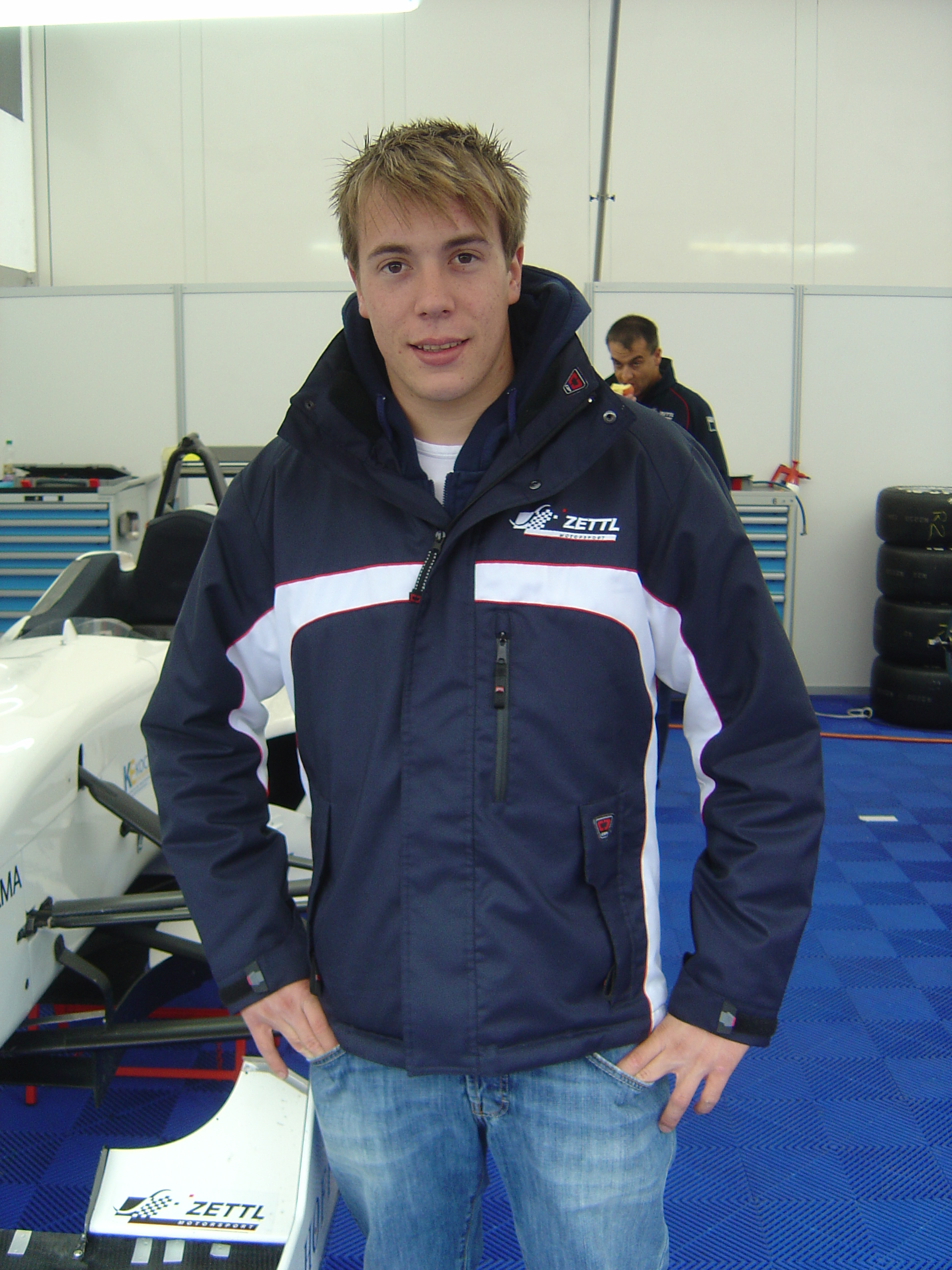
- Monien in 2009
- Nationality: (Germany) German
- Born: Nico Marvin Monien; 8 April 1990 (age 36) Berlin (Germany)

Previous series
- 2009 2009 2008: Formula 3 Euro Series; German Formula Three; ADAC Formel Masters

Nico Marvin Monien (born 8 April 1990 in Berlin) is a German former racing driver.

== Career ==
=== ADAC Formel Masters ===
Despite beginning his karting career in 2006, 2008 saw his debut in the ADAC Formel Masters championship with URD Rennsport. Monien finished as runner-up in the championship with two wins at TT Circuit Assen and Motorsport Arena Oschersleben.

=== Formula Three ===
In 2009, Monien stepped up to the German Formula Three Championship with Zettl Sportsline. He finished fifth in the standings after taking six podium places, including a win at EuroSpeedway Lausitz. He also appeared as a guest driver for Mücke Motorsport at the Formula 3 Euro Series finale at Hockenheim.

== Racing record ==
=== Career summary ===
| Season | Series | Team | Races | Wins | Poles | F/Laps | Podiums | Points | Position |
|---|---|---|---|---|---|---|---|---|---|
| 2008 | ADAC Formel Masters | URD Rennsport | 16 | 2 | 2 | 3 | 6 | 141 | 2nd |
| 2009 | ATS Formel 3 Cup | Zettl Sportsline | 18 | 1 | 0 | 1 | 6 | 61 | 5th |
| 2009 | Formula 3 Euro Series | Mücke Motorsport | 2 | 0 | 0 | 0 | 0 | 0 | NC† |

† - As Monien was a guest driver, he was ineligible for points.
