= 2012 ADAC Formel Masters =

Seasons
- ← 2011 2013 →

The 2012 ADAC Formel Masters season was an open-wheel motor racing series for emerging young racing drivers based out of Germany. It was the fifth season of the ADAC Formel Masters. The season began on 31 March at Motorsport Arena Oschersleben and finished on 30 September at Hockenheim after eight race weekends, totalling 24 races.

The championship was won by German driver Marvin Kirchhöfer.

== Season review ==
The first two poles of the season were claimed at Oschersleben by second-year driver Jeffrey Schmidt for the Lotus team, that was previously known as Motopark Academy. But he was passed by his team-mate Marvin Kirchhöfer on the opening lap of the first race, with Kirchhöfer going on to win his first race in single-seaters. Schmidt and Kirchhöfer collided in the second race, while Thomas Jäger secured his first win in the German series, and the first for his team, Neuhauser Racing, since 2008. Another Lotus driver Kuba Dalewski won the reverse-grid third race of the weekend in his first single-seaters meeting.

== Teams and drivers ==
Team	No.	Drivers	Rounds
(Germany) Lotus	2	(Poland) Kuba Dalewski	1–5
(Germany) Lotus	3	(Germany) Marvin Kirchhöfer	All
(Germany) Lotus	4	(Germany) Hubertus Carlos-Vier	3–4
(Germany) Lotus	5	(Netherlands) Beitske Visser	1–2, 4–6, 8
(Germany) Lotus	6	(Netherlands) Indy Dontje	All
(Germany) Lotus	7	(Switzerland) Jeffrey Schmidt	All
(Germany) Lotus	24	(Finland) Antti Buri	7
(Germany) Mücke Motorsport	8	(Israel) Roy Nissany	All
(Germany) Mücke Motorsport	9	(Germany) Florian Herzog	All
(Germany) Mücke Motorsport	10	(Germany) Luca Caspari	All
(Germany) Mücke Motorsport	12	(Germany) Jason Kremer	All
(Germany) ADAC Berlin-Brandenburg	11	(Germany) Hendrik Grapp	All
(Austria) Neuhauser Racing	14	(Sweden) Gustav Malja	All
(Austria) Neuhauser Racing	15	(Austria) Thomas Jäger	All
(Germany) Team KUG Motorsport	16	(Germany) Hubertus Carlos-Vier	1
(Germany) Team KUG Motorsport	17	(Germany) Nicolas Pohler	All
(Germany) KSW Motorsport	18	(Germany) Kim-Alexander Giersiepen	1–3, 7–8
(Germany) G&J/Schiler Motorsport	19	(Germany) Sebastian Balthasar	All
(Germany) G&J/Schiler Motorsport	21	(Belgium) Alessio Picariello	All
(Austria) HS Engineering	20	(Germany) Felix Wieland	All
(Austria) HS Engineering	23	(Denmark) Nicolas Beer	4–6, 8

== Race calendar and results ==
- The 2012 calendar was announced on 29 September 2011. Seven of eight race weekends are a part of the ADAC's Masters Weekend package, with an additional round at the Nürburgring that will support the ADAC Truck Grand Prix.

Round		Circuit	Date	Pole position	Fastest lap	Winning driver	Winning team
1	R1	(Germany) Motorsport Arena Oschersleben	31 March	(Switzerland) Jeffrey Schmidt	(Germany) Marvin Kirchhöfer	(Germany) Marvin Kirchhöfer	(Germany) Lotus
1	R2	(Germany) Motorsport Arena Oschersleben	1 April	(Switzerland) Jeffrey Schmidt	(Germany) Marvin Kirchhöfer	(Austria) Thomas Jäger	(Austria) Neuhauser Racing
1	R3	(Germany) Motorsport Arena Oschersleben	1 April		(Poland) Kuba Dalewski	(Poland) Kuba Dalewski	(Germany) Lotus
2	R1	(Netherlands) Circuit Park Zandvoort	5 May	(Germany) Marvin Kirchhöfer	(Germany) Marvin Kirchhöfer	(Germany) Marvin Kirchhöfer	(Germany) Lotus
2	R2	(Netherlands) Circuit Park Zandvoort	6 May	(Germany) Marvin Kirchhöfer	(Germany) Marvin Kirchhöfer	(Germany) Marvin Kirchhöfer	(Germany) Lotus
2	R3	(Netherlands) Circuit Park Zandvoort	6 May		(Sweden) Gustav Malja	(Netherlands) Beitske Visser	(Germany) Lotus
3	R1	(Germany) Sachsenring	9 June	(Germany) Marvin Kirchhöfer	(Sweden) Gustav Malja	(Sweden) Gustav Malja	(Austria) Neuhauser Racing
3	R2	(Germany) Sachsenring	10 June	(Sweden) Gustav Malja	(Sweden) Gustav Malja	(Sweden) Gustav Malja	(Austria) Neuhauser Racing
3	R3	(Germany) Sachsenring	10 June	Race abandoned^{1}			
4	R1	(Germany) Nürburgring	14 July	(Germany) Jason Kremer	(Belgium) Alessio Picariello	(Belgium) Alessio Picariello	(Germany) G&J/Schiller Motorsport
4	R2	(Germany) Nürburgring	14 July	(Germany) Jason Kremer	(Germany) Marvin Kirchhöfer	(Germany) Jason Kremer	(Germany) Mücke Motorsport
4	R3	(Germany) Nürburgring	15 July		(Germany) Jason Kremer	(Sweden) Gustav Malja	(Austria) Neuhauser Racing
5	R1	(Austria) Red Bull Ring	11 August	(Germany) Florian Herzog	(Sweden) Gustav Malja	(Israel) Roy Nissany	(Germany) Mücke Motorsport
5	R2	(Austria) Red Bull Ring	12 August	(Belgium) Alessio Picariello	(Germany) Jason Kremer	(Belgium) Alessio Picariello	(Germany) G&J/Schiller Motorsport
5	R3	(Austria) Red Bull Ring	12 August		(Germany) Marvin Kirchhöfer	(Germany) Marvin Kirchhöfer	(Germany) Lotus
6	R1	(Germany) Lausitzring	25 August	(Germany) Hendrik Grapp	(Germany) Florian Herzog	(Germany) Hendrik Grapp	(Germany) ADAC Berlin-Brandenburg
6	R2	(Germany) Lausitzring	26 August	(Netherlands) Beitske Visser	(Sweden) Gustav Malja	(Netherlands) Beitske Visser	(Germany) Lotus
6	R3	(Germany) Lausitzring	26 August		(Switzerland) Jeffrey Schmidt	(Switzerland) Jeffrey Schmidt	(Germany) Lotus
7	R1	(Germany) Nürburgring	15 September	(Germany) Marvin Kirchhöfer	(Sweden) Gustav Malja	(Germany) Marvin Kirchhöfer	(Germany) Lotus
7	R2	(Germany) Nürburgring	16 September	(Germany) Marvin Kirchhöfer	(Sweden) Gustav Malja	(Germany) Marvin Kirchhöfer	(Germany) Lotus
7	R3	(Germany) Nürburgring	16 September		(Sweden) Gustav Malja	(Germany) Hendrik Grapp	(Germany) ADAC Berlin-Brandenburg
8	R1	(Germany) Hockenheimring	29 September	(Germany) Marvin Kirchhöfer	(Germany) Marvin Kirchhöfer	(Germany) Marvin Kirchhöfer	(Germany) Lotus
8	R2	(Germany) Hockenheimring	29 September	(Germany) Marvin Kirchhöfer	(Germany) Marvin Kirchhöfer	(Germany) Marvin Kirchhöfer	(Germany) Lotus
8	R3	(Germany) Hockenheimring	30 September		(Germany) Marvin Kirchhöfer	(Germany) Marvin Kirchhöfer	(Germany) Lotus

Notes:

- ^1 — The third race at the Sachsenring was abandoned following an accident in which Florian Herzog and Kim-Alexander Giersiepen collided with a course car while marshals were recovering the car of Nicolas Pohler from a gravel trap.

== Championship standings ==
=== Drivers' Championship ===
- Points are awarded as follows:

	1	2	3	4	5	6	7	8	9	10
Races 1 & 2	25	18	15	12	10	8	6	4	2	1
Race 3	15	10	8	7	6	5	4	3	2	1

Pos	Driver	OSC (Germany)			ZAN (Netherlands)			SAC (Germany)			NÜR (Germany)			RBR (Austria)			LAU (Germany)			NÜR (Germany)			HOC (Germany)			Pts
1	(Germany) Marvin Kirchhöfer	1	17	5	**1**	**1**	3	**2**	4	C	3	2	2	Ret	7	1	3	10	6	**1**	**1**	2	**1**	**1**	1	329
2	(Sweden) Gustav Malja	5	4	3	3	13	2	1	**1**	C	5	4	1	2	2	4	2	2	3	3	2	7	2	3	3	307
3	(Switzerland) Jeffrey Schmidt	**3**	**16**	8	5	12	4	5	3	C	4	5	4	8	12	7	5	3	1	4	5	Ret	4	4	2	193
4	(Germany) Jason Kremer	2	6	15	7	2	9	4	2	C	**2**	**1**	3	4	5	2	10	8	Ret	11	8	4	5	11	Ret	191
5	(Austria) Thomas Jäger	8	1	12	Ret	6	Ret	7	14	C	6	6	7	5	4	3	6	14	5	15	3	8	3	2	4	165
6	(Belgium) Alessio Picariello	10	2	4	12	5	7	Ret	8	C	1	3	DSQ	3	**1**	5	Ret	9	4	7	12	13	10	7	14	152
7	(Netherlands) Indy Dontje	14	12	14	8	4	8	3	5	C	12	9	6	7	10	10	12	5	Ret	6	4	11	7	5	5	111
8	(Netherlands) Beitske Visser	9	5	Ret	DNS	8	1				8	12	12	6	6	15	4	**1**	Ret				6	6	6	109
9	(Israel) Roy Nissany	Ret	8	10	6	11	5	Ret	7	C	7	8	5	1	16	Ret	7	6	Ret	8	6	DSQ	9	10	8	98
10	(Germany) Luca Caspari	7	7	2	2	14	6	6	6	C	9	11	13	10	15	8	9	DSQ	7	5	Ret	3	11	12	Ret	91
11	(Germany) Hendrik Grapp	6	11	13	DNS	7	16	8	10	C	17	10	14	9	11	11	**1**	12	9	2	7	1	Ret	DNS	12	88
12	(Poland) Kuba Dalewski	13	3	1	4	3	15	9	16	C	14	7	Ret	Ret	3	14										80
13	(Germany) Sebastian Balthasar	16	9	7	11	10	14	11	Ret	C	16	15	9	14	17	6	8	4	Ret	9	13	Ret	Ret	8	10	37
14	(Germany) Florian Herzog	4	10	6	9	9	10	Ret	9	C	11	14	10	**12**	8	13	14	13	DSQ	10	Ret	9	14	9	9	37
15	(Germany) Felix Wieland	11	14	9	DNS	16	13	13	15	C	18	18	11	Ret	9	Ret	11	7	2	13	10	10	Ret	16	13	22
16	(Denmark) Nicolas Beer										10	16	8	11	13	9	Ret	11	8				8	13	7	13
17	(Finland) Antti Buri																			12	9	5				8
18	(Germany) Nicolas Pohler	12	13	11	10	15	11	12	12	C	15	17	Ret	13	14	12	13	Ret	Ret	14	11	6	12	14	11	6
19	(Germany) Hubertus-Carlos Vier	DNS	DNS	DNS				10	13	C	13	13	15													1
20	(Germany) Kim-Alexander Giersiepen	15	15	16	Ret	DNS	12	14	11	C										16	14	12	15	15	15	0
Pos	Driver	OSC (Germany)			ZAN (Netherlands)			SAC (Germany)			NÜR (Germany)			RBR (Austria)			LAU (Germany)			NÜR (Germany)			HOC (Germany)			Pts

Colour	Result
Gold	Winner
Silver	Second place
Bronze	Third place
Green	Points classification
Blue	Non-points classification
Blue	Non-classified finish (NC)
Purple	Retired, not classified (Ret)
Red	Did not qualify (DNQ)
Red	Did not pre-qualify (DNPQ)
Black	Disqualified (DSQ)
White	Did not start (DNS)
White	Withdrew (WD)
White	Race cancelled (C)
Blank	Did not practice (DNP)
Blank	Did not arrive (DNA)
Blank	Excluded (EX)

**Bold** – Pole
Italics – Fastest Lap

=== Teams' Championship ===
Pos	Team	OSC (Germany)			ZAN (Netherlands)			SAC (Germany)			NÜR (Germany)			RBR (Austria)			LAU (Germany)			NÜR (Germany)	HOC (Germany)	Pts
1	(Germany) Lotus	1	3	1	1	1	1	2	3	C	3	2	2	6	3	1	3	1	1			461
1	(Germany) Lotus	3	5	5	4	3	3	3	4	C	4	5	4	7	6	7	4	3	6			461
2	(Germany) Mücke Motorsport	2	6	2	2	2	5	4	2	C	2	1	3	1	5	2	1	6	7			366
2	(Germany) Mücke Motorsport	4	7	6	6	7	6	6	6	C	7	8	5	4	8	8	7	8	9			366
3	(Austria) Neuhauser Racing	5	1	3	3	6	2	1	1	C	5	4	1	2	2	3	2	2	3			355
3	(Austria) Neuhauser Racing	8	4	12	Ret	13	Ret	7	14	C	6	6	7	5	4	4	6	14	5			355
4	(Germany) G&J/Schiller Motorsport	10	2	4	11	5	7	11	8	C	1	3	9	3	1	5	8	4	4			215
4	(Germany) G&J/Schiller Motorsport	16	9	7	12	10	14	Ret	Ret	C	16	15	DSQ	14	17	6	Ret	9	Ret			215
5	(Austria) HS Engineering	11	14	9	DNS	16	13	13	15	C	10	16	8	11	9	9	11	7	2			63
5	(Austria) HS Engineering										18	18	11	Ret	13	Ret	Ret	11	8			63
6	(Germany) Team KUG Motorsport	12	13	11	10	15	11	12	12	C	15	17	Ret	13	14	12	13	Ret	Ret			36
6	(Germany) Team KUG Motorsport	DNS	DNS	DNS																		36
7	(Germany) KSW Motorsport	15	15	16	Ret	DNS	12	14	11	C												11
Pos	Team	OSC (Germany)			ZAN (Netherlands)			SAC (Germany)			NÜR (Germany)			RBR (Austria)			LAU (Germany)			NÜR (Germany)	HOC (Germany)	Pts

Colour	Result
Gold	Winner
Silver	Second place
Bronze	Third place
Green	Points classification
Blue	Non-points classification
Blue	Non-classified finish (NC)
Purple	Retired, not classified (Ret)
Red	Did not qualify (DNQ)
Red	Did not pre-qualify (DNPQ)
Black	Disqualified (DSQ)
White	Did not start (DNS)
White	Withdrew (WD)
White	Race cancelled (C)
Blank	Did not practice (DNP)
Blank	Did not arrive (DNA)
Blank	Excluded (EX)
