= Roy Nissany =

Israeli racing driver

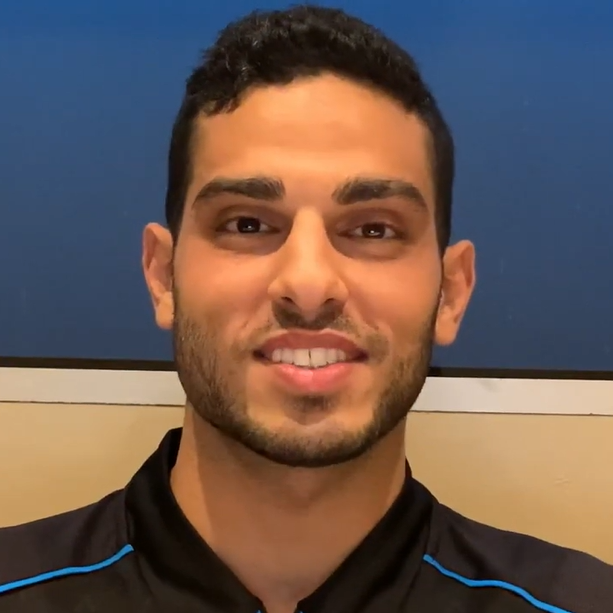
- Nissany in 2020
- Nationality: (Israel) Israeli
- Born: 30 November 1994 (age 31) Tel Aviv, Israel
- Relatives: Chanoch Nissany (father)

European Le Mans Series career
- Debut season: 2025
- Current team: Nielsen Racing
- Categorisation: FIA Gold
- Car number: 24
- Former teams: Duqueine Team
- Starts: 6 (6 entries)
- Wins: 0
- Podiums: 0
- Poles: 1
- Fastest laps: 0
- Best finish: 15th in 2025

Previous series
- 2018, 2020–23 2021 2015–17 2013–14 2011–12 2010: FIA Formula 2 Championship; F3 Asian Championship; World Series Formula V8 3.5; FIA F3 European Championship; ADAC Formel Masters; Formula Lista Junior

Roy Nissany (Hebrew: רוי ניסני [ˈʁoj nisaˈni]; born 30 November 1994) is an Israeli racing driver who is set to compete in the European Le Mans Series with Nielsen Racing. He previously drove for Duqueine Team in 2025.

Nissany previously competed in the 2023 Formula 2 Championship with PHM Racing by Charouz. He is the son of former racing driver Chanoch Nissany.

== Personal life ==
Nissany was born in Tel Aviv, Israel, and resides in Herzliya, Israel. He is the son of the former Israeli one-time Minardi Formula One test driver, Chanoch Nissany. Nissany races under the flag of his native Israel, however he also holds a French passport.

== Junior career ==
=== Karting ===
Nissany began karting at the age of six. In 2004, he drove for the Hungarian G-Kart Racing Team, and finished fourth overall in the FIA Central European Zone Trophy and in the Hungarian Karting Championship. In 2007, Nissany drove for the Italian Morsicani Racing Team, racing in the Italian Open Masters and 13th Winter Cup in Lonato del Garda. In the following year, he raced for the Gandolfi Racing Team and scored a best finish of second in the Mille Dollari race in Pomposa.

=== Junior formulae ===
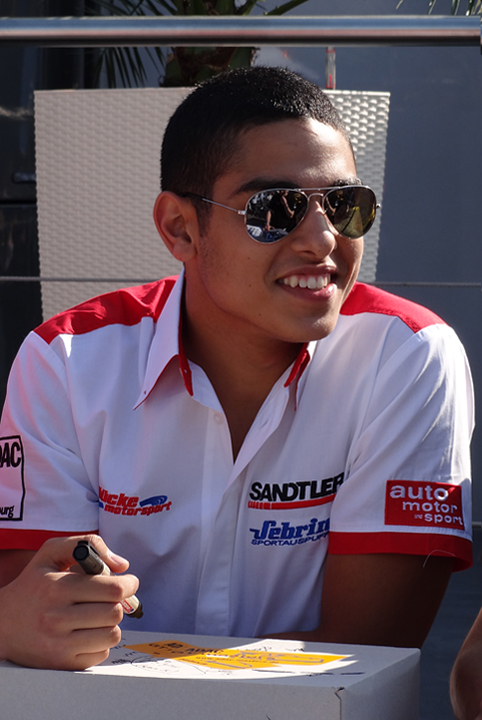
Nissany in 2011

Nissany began his car racing career in 2010, finishing eighth in the 2010 Formula Lista Junior championship and scoring a pole position at Monza. In 2011, he moved to the ADAC Formel Masters series (now ADAC Formula 4) for the Mücke Motorsport team, racing against drivers such as Pascal Wehrlein and Artem Markelov. He finished the season in 11th place, scoring two podium finishes. Nissany competed again in 2012, finishing in ninth place and scoring one win at the Red Bull Ring.

=== Formula 3 European Championship ===
==== 2013 ====
In 2013, Nissany moved up to the FIA Formula 3 European Championship with Mücke Motorsport alongside future IndyCar driver Felix Rosenqvist. Nissany scored 11 points including two eighth-place finishes, and ended the season 22nd in the championship.

==== 2014 ====
He competed again in 2014 alongside Rosenqvist and Lucas Auer. Nissany finished 17th in the championship with 26 points, his best race result being sixth place at the Nürburgring.

=== Formula Renault 3.5 Series ===
==== 2015 ====
In 2015, Nissany moved to the Formula Renault 3.5 Series with Tech 1 Racing alongside Aurélien Panis. Nissany took a podium finish with third place at the Red Bull Ring, and ended the season 13th in the championship with 27 points to Panis' 42.

==== 2016 ====
Nissany moved to Lotus for the 2016 season alongside René Binder. His 2016 season was more successful; he claimed three pole positions, three race wins and four further podium finishes to end the season fourth in the championship, ahead of Binder and behind future Formula 2 competitor Louis Delétraz.

==== 2017 ====
Nissany then moved to RP Motorsport for 2017 as the series became the World Series Formula V8 3.5. Nissany was one of only eight full-time drivers in the series, which folded the following year due to a lack of entries. Nissany had another successful season, winning a race at the Circuito de Jerez and claiming five more podium places to finish fifth in the championship.

=== FIA Formula 2 Championship ===
==== 2018 ====
In 2018, Nissany competed in the FIA Formula 2 Championship with Campos Vexatec Racing. After the tenth round in Monza, Nissany had scored only a single point – a tenth-place finish at the feature race at Spa-Francorchamps. In contrast, teammate Luca Ghiotto had collected 94 points including four podium finishes. Nissany was then replaced by Roberto Merhi for the remaining two rounds of the season.

==== 2019 ====
Nissany suffered a training injury at the beginning of 2019 and did not compete in racing during the year.

==== 2020 ====
In 2020, Nissany returned to Formula 2 to race for Trident Racing alongside Marino Sato. Nissany scored a point in the opening race at the Red Bull Ring, finishing tenth. His next points finish came at the thirteenth race of the season, the feature race at Spa-Francorchamps, where he finished eighth. This put Nissany on reverse-grid pole position for the sprint race, however he was forced to retire from the race after a collision with fellow Williams Driver Academy member Dan Ticktum. Nissany ended the season 19th in the drivers' championship, scoring five of his team's six points that year. In December 2020, Nissany drove for DAMS in the post-season Formula 2 test at the Bahrain International Circuit.

==== 2021 ====
In January 2021, it was confirmed that Nissany would move to DAMS for the 2021 season, driving alongside Ferrari Driver Academy member Marcus Armstrong. Nissany qualified seventh for the Monaco round, his best Formula 2 qualifying position. This put him fourth on the grid for the opening sprint race, and an oil leak for Christian Lundgaard during the race elevated Nissany to third place and allowed him to claim his first Formula 2 podium finish. Unfortunately for Nissany, his only other points finish came in Monza, as he ended up 16th in the championship.

==== 2022 ====
Nissany remained with DAMS for a second season, partnering F3 graduate Ayumu Iwasa. Starting the season out at Bahrain, he finished eighth in the feature race, scoring his first points of the season. More points followed in Jeddah, before Nissany qualified sixth in Imola. After taking fourth in the sprint race, Nissany made a sublime start on Sunday, taking the lead going into the first corner. He would ultimately lose his chance of victory, crashing at the final corner on lap 20. He came back with a point at Barcelona, however from this point, Nissany would go three events without finishing in the points. The Israeli driver broke his duck in Austria, taking ninth place in the feature race, and he would score the same result in France. Following the accumulation of 12 penalty points by the conclusion of the round at Zandvoort, he received a ban for the following event in Monza. Nissany returned to action for the season finale at Yas Marina, where he qualified second and finished in the points in both races, leading him to conclude the campaign sitting 19th in the standings.

==== 2023 ====
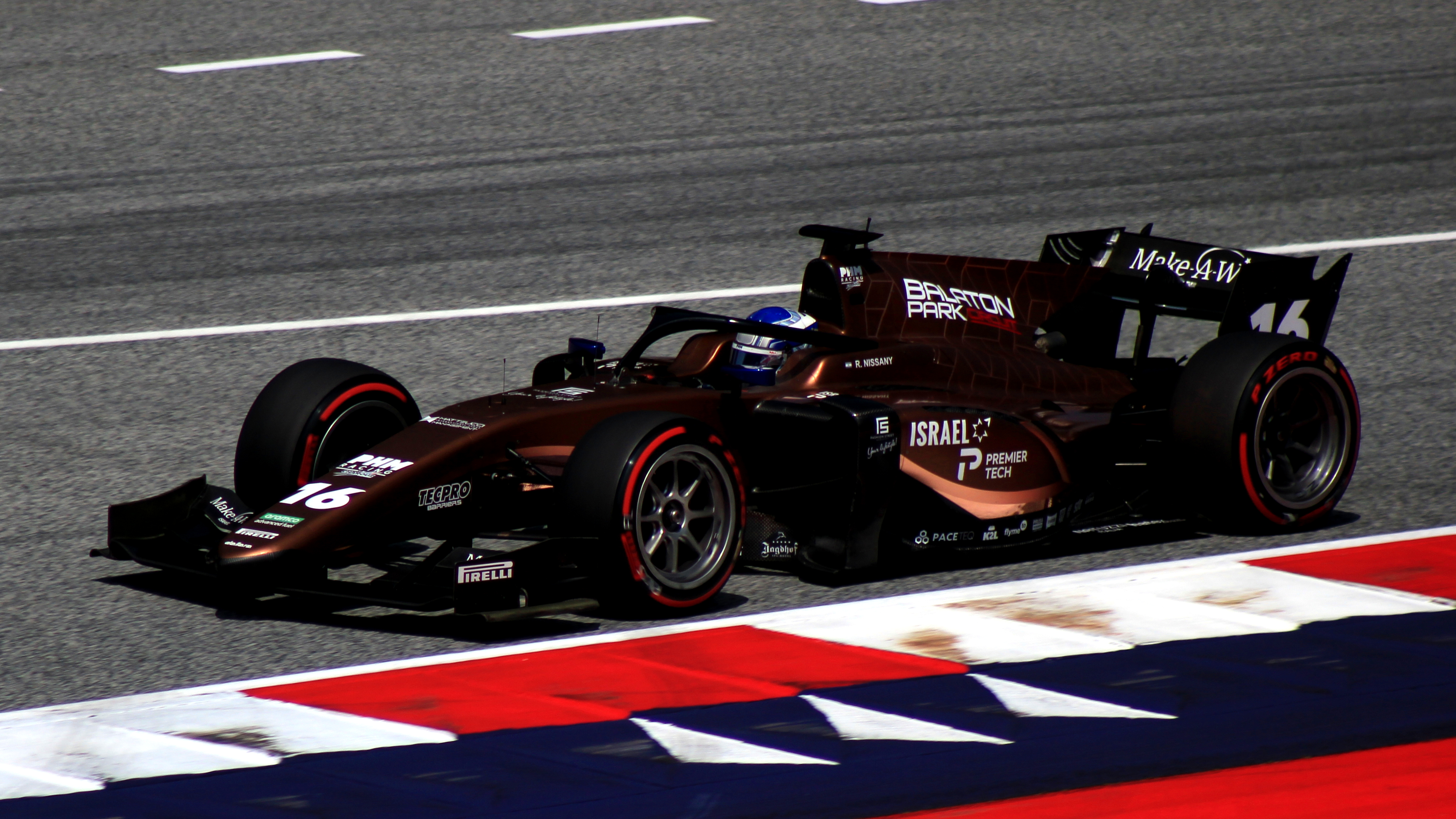
Nissany driving for PHM Racing during the 2023 Spielberg Formula 2 round.

During the 2022 post-season testing, Nissany reunited with Charouz Racing System. Shortly after, he was announced for the team for the 2023 season, under the new name PHM Racing by Charouz. The campaign turned out to be the Israeli's weakest in Formula 2, as he and the team failed to score points, with Nissany ending up 21st and last of all full-time drivers in the standings.

== Formula One ==
Nissany had his first experience with a Formula One car in October 2014, testing the Sauber C31 at the Circuito Ricardo Tormo. In December 2019, he took part in post-season testing with Williams at Yas Marina Circuit. In January 2020, it was announced that Williams had appointed Nissany as their official test driver for the 2020 season. He made his Grand Prix weekend debut at the Spanish Grand Prix, taking part in the first practice session (FP1) for the team. He later appeared in FP1 sessions at the Italian and Bahrain Grands Prix, as well as representing Williams at the post-season young driver test at Yas Marina Circuit.

Nissany was retained by Williams in his test driver role for the 2021 season. He took part in the first day of pre-season testing with the team, recording 83 laps of the Bahrain International Circuit. He appeared in three FP1 sessions with Williams during the season, at the Spanish, French and Austrian Grands Prix.

Nissany remained a member of the Williams Driver Academy for the 2022 season. However, he did not partake in any free practice sessions that year and was not included in the academy line-up the following year.

== Sportscar racing career ==
=== European Le Mans Series ===
At the end of 2024, Nissany took part in the European Le Mans Series rookie test, driving a Ferrari 296 GT3 for AF Corse.

On 24 February 2025, it was announced that Nissany would make his full-time debut in the 2025 European Le Mans Series driving for the Duqueine Team in LMP2. This would be his first foray into sportscar racing. This was also his first time driving in any series in almost a year. Alongside Reshad de Gerus, Nissany scored a best result of seventh at Le Castellet and finished 15th in the standings, last of the full-time drivers. Nissany took part in one qualifying session during the campaign, placing sixth at Silverstone.

In 2026, Nissany returned to the ELMS, joining Nielsen Racing.

== Driving standards ==
Throughout his time in FIA Formula 2, Nissany's racecraft has borne the brunt of criticism. This culminated in a chaotic 2022 season, which began when Richard Verschoor called for the Israeli driver to "go choose another sport" after the latter's defensive driving had caused a collision which ended the Dutchman's race in Bahrain. Another notable collision came at Silverstone, where Nissany received a five-place grid penalty, having forced Dennis Hauger off the track on the exit on the approach to Vale, which subsequently forced Hauger's car over the sausage kerb on the inside of the corner, catapulting it onto the Halo of Nissany's vehicle. Later in the year, a collision with David Beckmann at Zandvoort caused Nissany to be banned from the subsequent round, as he had accrued twelve penalty points across the campaign.

Nissany once again amassed a number of penalty points during the 2023 season, sitting on nine penalty points after twelve rounds. Chief among his misdeeds proved to be a collision with Zane Maloney at Monza, where the Israeli spun his rival on the main straightaway, causing Maloney's car to impact the barriers heavily and earning Nissany three penalty points.

== Racing record ==
=== Karting career summary ===
Season	Series	Team	Position
2008	South Garda Winter Cup — KF3		95th
2008	Italian Open Masters — KF3	Morsicani Racing	28th
2008	Torneo Industrie — KF3	Gandolfio Ennio Racing	33rd
2009	South Garda Winter Cup — KF3	Gandolfi Ennio Racing	DNF

=== Racing career summary ===
Season	Series	Team	Races	Wins	Poles	F/Laps	Podiums	Points	Position
2010	Formula Lista Junior	Daltec Racing	12	0	1	1	0	43	8th
2011	ADAC Formel Masters	Mücke Motorsport	24	0	0	0	2	81	11th
2012	ADAC Formel Masters	Mücke Motorsport	23	1	0	0	1	98	9th
2013	FIA Formula 3 European Championship	Mücke Motorsport	30	0	0	0	0	11	22nd
2014	FIA Formula 3 European Championship	Mücke Motorsport	33	0	0	0	0	26	17th
2014	Formula One	Sauber F1 Team	Test driver						
2015	Formula Renault 3.5 Series	Tech 1 Racing	17	0	0	0	1	27	13th
2016	Formula V8 3.5 Series	Lotus	18	3	3	5	7	189	4th
2017	World Series Formula V8 3.5	RP Motorsport	18	1	0	2	6	201	5th
2018	FIA Formula 2 Championship	Campos Vexatec Racing	20	0	0	0	0	1	22nd
2019	Formula One	ROKiT Williams Racing	Test driver						
2020	FIA Formula 2 Championship	Trident	24	0	0	2	0	5	19th
2020	Formula One	Williams Racing	Test driver						
2021	FIA Formula 2 Championship	DAMS	23	0	0	0	1	16	16th
2021	F3 Asian Championship	Hitech Grand Prix	15	0	0	0	2	99	5th
2021	Formula One	Williams Racing	Test driver						
2022	FIA Formula 2 Championship	DAMS	26	0	0	0	0	20	19th
2022	Formula One	Williams Racing	Test driver						
2023	FIA Formula 2 Championship	PHM Racing by Charouz	26	0	0	0	0	0	21st
2025	European Le Mans Series -LMP2	Duqueine Team	6	0	0	0	0	10	15th
2026	European Le Mans Series - LMP2	Nielsen Racing	0	0	0	0	0	0	TBD

=== Complete Formula Lista Junior results ===
(key) (Races in bold indicate pole position) (Races in italics indicate fastest lap)

Year	Team	1	2	3	4	5	6	7	8	9	10	11	12	Pos	Points
2010	Daltec Racing	HOC1; 1; 8	HOC1; 2; 5	NÜR; 1; 4	NÜR; 2; 6	MOS; 1; 8	MOS; 2 Ret	HOC2; 1; 7	HOC2; 2; 9	MAG; 1; 9	MAG; 2; 8	MNZ; 1 Ret	**MNZ**; **2**; 11	8th	43

=== Complete ADAC Formel Masters results ===
(key) (Races in bold indicate pole position) (Races in italics indicate fastest lap)

Year	Team	1	2	3	4	5	6	7	8	9	10	11	12	13	14	15	16	17	18	19	20	21	22	23	24	DC	Points
2011	Mücke Motorsport	OSC; 1; 3	OSC; 2; 4	OSC; 3; 9	SAC; 1; 10	SAC; 2; 11	SAC; 3; 7	ZOL; 1 Ret	ZOL; 2; 16	ZOL; 3; 8	NÜR; 1; 3	NÜR; 2; 23	NÜR; 3; 9	RBR; 1 Ret	RBR; 2; 10	RBR; 3; 4	LAU; 1; 10	LAU; 2; 12	LAU; 3; 13	ASS; 1 Ret	ASS; 2; 17	ASS; 3; 18	HOC; 1 Ret	HOC; 2; 17	HOC; 3; 15	11th	81
2012	Mücke Motorsport	OSC; 1 Ret	OSC; 2; 8	OSC; 3; 10	ZAN; 1; 6	ZAN; 2; 11	ZAN; 3; 5	SAC; 1 Ret	SAC; 2; 7	SAC; 3 C	NÜR1; 1; 7	NÜR1; 2; 8	NÜR1; 3; 5	RBR; 1; 1	RBR; 2; 16	RBR; 3 Ret	LAU; 1; 7	LAU; 2; 6	LAU; 3 Ret	NÜR2; 1; 8	NÜR2; 2; 6	NÜR2; 3 DSQ	HOC; 1; 9	HOC; 2; 10	HOC; 3; 8	9th	98

=== Complete FIA Formula 3 European Championship results ===
(key) (Races in bold indicate pole position) (Races in italics indicate fastest lap)

Year	Entrant	Engine	1	2	3	4	5	6	7	8	9	10	11	12	13	14	15	16	17	18	19	20	21	22	23	24	25	26	27	28	29	30	31	32	33	DC	Points
2013	kfzteile24 Mücke Motorsport	Mercedes	MNZ; 1 Ret	MNZ; 2; 17	MNZ; 3 Ret	SIL; 1; 21	SIL; 2; 18	SIL; 3 Ret	HOC; 1; 24	HOC; 2; 16	HOC; 3 Ret	BRH; 1; 18	BRH; 2; 23	BRH; 3; 8	RBR; 1; 11	RBR; 2; 15	RBR; 3; 10	NOR; 1; 8	NOR; 2; 15	NOR; 3 Ret	NÜR; 1; 17	NÜR; 2 Ret	NÜR; 3; 18	ZAN; 1; 15	ZAN; 2; 14	ZAN; 3; 12	VAL; 1; 22	VAL; 2; 13	VAL; 3; 17	HOC; 1; 18	HOC; 2; 15	HOC; 3; 15				22nd	11
2014	kfzteile24 Mücke Motorsport	Mercedes	SIL; 1; 20	SIL; 2; 22	SIL; 3; 16	HOC; 1 Ret	HOC; 2; 15	HOC; 3; 8	PAU; 1; 20	PAU; 2; 9	PAU; 3; 16	HUN; 1; 15	HUN; 2; 14	HUN; 3; 11	SPA; 1; 16	SPA; 2; 11	SPA; 3; 12	NOR; 1; 7	NOR; 2; 19	NOR; 3 Ret	MSC; 1; 18	MSC; 2; 14	MSC; 3; 16	RBR; 1; 11	RBR; 2; 14	RBR; 3; 11	NÜR; 1; 15	NÜR; 2; 11	NÜR; 3; 6	IMO; 1 Ret	IMO; 2; 21	IMO; 3; 12	HOC; 1; 11	HOC; 2; 7	HOC; 3; 13	17th	26

=== Complete World Series Formula V8 3.5 results ===
(key) (Races in bold indicate pole position) (Races in italics indicate fastest lap)

Year	Team	1	2	3	4	5	6	7	8	9	10	11	12	13	14	15	16	17	18	Pos	Points
2015	Tech 1 Racing	ALC; 1; 14	ALC; 2; 16	MON; 1; 12	SPA; 1; 14	SPA; 2 Ret	HUN; 1; 8	HUN; 2; 14	RBR; 1; 16	RBR; 2; 3	SIL; 1; 9	SIL; 2; 14	NÜR; 1 Ret	NÜR; 2; 18	BUG; 1; 8	BUG; 2; 12	JER; 1; 9	JER; 2 Ret		13th	27
2016	Lotus	ALC; 1; 7	ALC; 2; 7	HUN; 1; 6	HUN; 2; 2	SPA; 1 Ret	SPA; 2 Ret	LEC; 1; 2	**LEC**; **2**; 2	SIL; 1; 1	SIL; 2; 1	RBR; 1; 6	RBR; 2; 13	**MNZ**; **1**; 1	**MNZ**; **2**; 6	JER; 1; 8	JER; 2; 14	CAT; 1; 9	CAT; 2; 2	4th	189
2017	RP Motorsport	SIL; 1 Ret	SIL; 2; 3	SPA; 1; 2	SPA; 2; 4	MNZ; 1; 2	MNZ; 2; 2	JER; 1; 1	JER; 2 Ret	ALC; 1; 4	ALC; 2; 6	NÜR; 1; 4	NÜR; 2; 5	MEX; 1; 9	MEX; 2; 8	COA; 1; 6	COA; 2; 4	BHR; 1; 3	BHR; 2; 4	5th	201

=== Complete FIA Formula 2 Championship results ===
(key) (Races in bold indicate pole position) (Races in italics indicate points for the fastest lap of top ten finishers)

Year	Entrant	1	2	3	4	5	6	7	8	9	10	11	12	13	14	15	16	17	18	19	20	21	22	23	24	25	26	27	28	DC	Points
2018	Campos Vexatec Racing	BHR; FEA; 16	BHR; SPR; 15	BAK; FEA; Ret	BAK; SPR; Ret	CAT; FEA; 12	CAT; SPR; 14	MON; FEA; 12	MON; SPR; Ret	LEC; FEA; 15	LEC; SPR; 10	RBR; FEA; Ret	RBR; SPR; 17	SIL; FEA; 15	SIL; SPR; 14	HUN; FEA; 15	HUN; SPR; 15	SPA; FEA; 10	SPA; SPR; 14	MNZ; FEA; 16	MNZ; SPR; 15	SOC; FEA	SOC; SPR	YMC; FEA	YMC; SPR					22nd	1
2020	Trident Racing	RBR; FEA; 10	RBR; SPR; 12	RBR; FEA; 15	RBR; SPR; 18	HUN; FEA; Ret	HUN; SPR; 17	SIL; FEA; Ret	SIL; SPR; 16	SIL; FEA; 18	SIL; SPR; 15	CAT; FEA; Ret	CAT; SPR; 12	SPA; FEA; 8	SPA; SPR; Ret	MNZ; FEA; 19	MNZ; SPR; 10	MUG; FEA; 15	MUG; SPR; 10	SOC; FEA; Ret	SOC; SPR; 19	BHR; FEA; 15	BHR; SPR; 9	BHR; FEA; 20	BHR; SPR; 15					19th	5
2021	DAMS	BHR; SP1; 12	BHR; SP2; 15	BHR; FEA; Ret	MCO; SP1; 3	MCO; SP2; Ret	MCO; FEA; 9	BAK; SP1; 16	BAK; SP2; 16	BAK; FEA; 16	SIL; SP1; Ret	SIL; SP2; 12	SIL; FEA; 16	MNZ; SP1; Ret	MNZ; SP2; 18	MNZ; FEA; 8	SOC; SP1; 16	SOC; SP2; C	SOC; FEA; 15	JED; SP1; 13	JED; SP2; 11	JED; FEA; 15	YMC; SP1; 14	YMC; SP2; 17	YMC; FEA; 13					16th	16
2022	DAMS	BHR; SPR; 12	BHR; FEA; 8	JED; SPR; 9	JED; FEA; 8	IMO; SPR; 4	IMO; FEA; Ret	CAT; SPR; 15	CAT; FEA; 10	MCO; SPR; 9	MCO; FEA; Ret	BAK; SPR; 10	BAK; FEA; Ret	SIL; SPR; 14	SIL; FEA; Ret	RBR; SPR; 13	RBR; FEA; 9	LEC; SPR; 16	LEC; FEA; 9	HUN; SPR; 19	HUN; FEA; 18	SPA; SPR; 11	SPA; FEA; 19	ZAN; SPR; 15	ZAN; FEA; 16	MNZ; SPR; EX	MNZ; FEA; EX	YMC; SPR; 8	YMC; FEA; 10	19th	20
2023	PHM Racing by Charouz	BHR; SPR; 18	BHR; FEA; 11	JED; SPR; 10	JED; FEA; 11	MEL; SPR; 9	MEL; FEA; Ret	BAK; SPR; Ret	BAK; FEA; 18	MCO; SPR; Ret	MCO; FEA; 15	CAT; SPR; 20†	CAT; FEA; 18	RBR; SPR; 10	RBR; FEA; 16	SIL; SPR; 9	SIL; FEA; 17	HUN; SPR; 17	HUN; FEA; 15	SPA; SPR; 13	SPA; FEA; 12	ZAN; SPR; 17	ZAN; FEA; 12	MNZ; SPR; Ret	MNZ; FEA; 15	YMC; SPR; 14	YMC; FEA; 11			21st	0

=== Complete Formula One participations ===
Year	Entrant	Chassis	Engine	1	2	3	4	5	6	7	8	9	10	11	12	13	14	15	16	17	18	19	20	21	22	WDC	Points
2020	Williams Racing	Williams FW43	Mercedes M11 EQ Performance 1.6 V6 t	AUT	STY	HUN	GBR	70A	ESP; TD	BEL	ITA; TD	TUS	RUS	EIF	POR	EMI	TUR	BHR; TD	SKH	ABU						—	—
2021	Williams Racing	Williams FW43B	Mercedes M12 E Performance 1.6 V6 t	BHR	EMI	POR	ESP; TD	MON	AZE	FRA; TD	STY	AUT; TD	GBR	HUN	BEL	NED	ITA	RUS	TUR	USA	MXC	SAP	QAT	SAU	ABU	–	–

=== Complete F3 Asian Championship results ===
(key) (Races in bold indicate pole position) (Races in italics indicate fastest lap)

Year	Entrant	1	2	3	4	5	6	7	8	9	10	11	12	13	14	15	DC	Points
2021	Hitech Grand Prix	DUB; 1; 2	DUB; 2; 8	DUB; 3; 3	ABU; 1; 7	ABU; 2; 8	ABU; 3; 7	ABU; 1; 5	ABU; 2 Ret	ABU; 3; 11	DUB; 1; 8	DUB; 2 Ret	DUB; 3; 7	ABU; 1; 4	ABU; 2; 7	ABU; 3; 6	5th	99

=== Complete European Le Mans Series results ===
(key) (Races in bold indicate pole position; results in italics indicate fastest lap)

Year	Entrant	Class	Chassis	Engine	1	2	3	4	5	6	Rank	Points
2025	Duqueine Team	LMP2	Oreca 07	Gibson GK428 4.2 L V8	**CAT**; Ret	LEC; 7	IMO; 9	SPA; 10	SIL; 11	ALG; Ret	15th	10
2026	Nielsen Racing	LMP2	Oreca 07	Gibson GK428 4.2 L V8	CAT; 7	LEC; 10	IMO; 5	SPA; 8	SIL; 4	ALG; 9	11th	35

== Photos ==
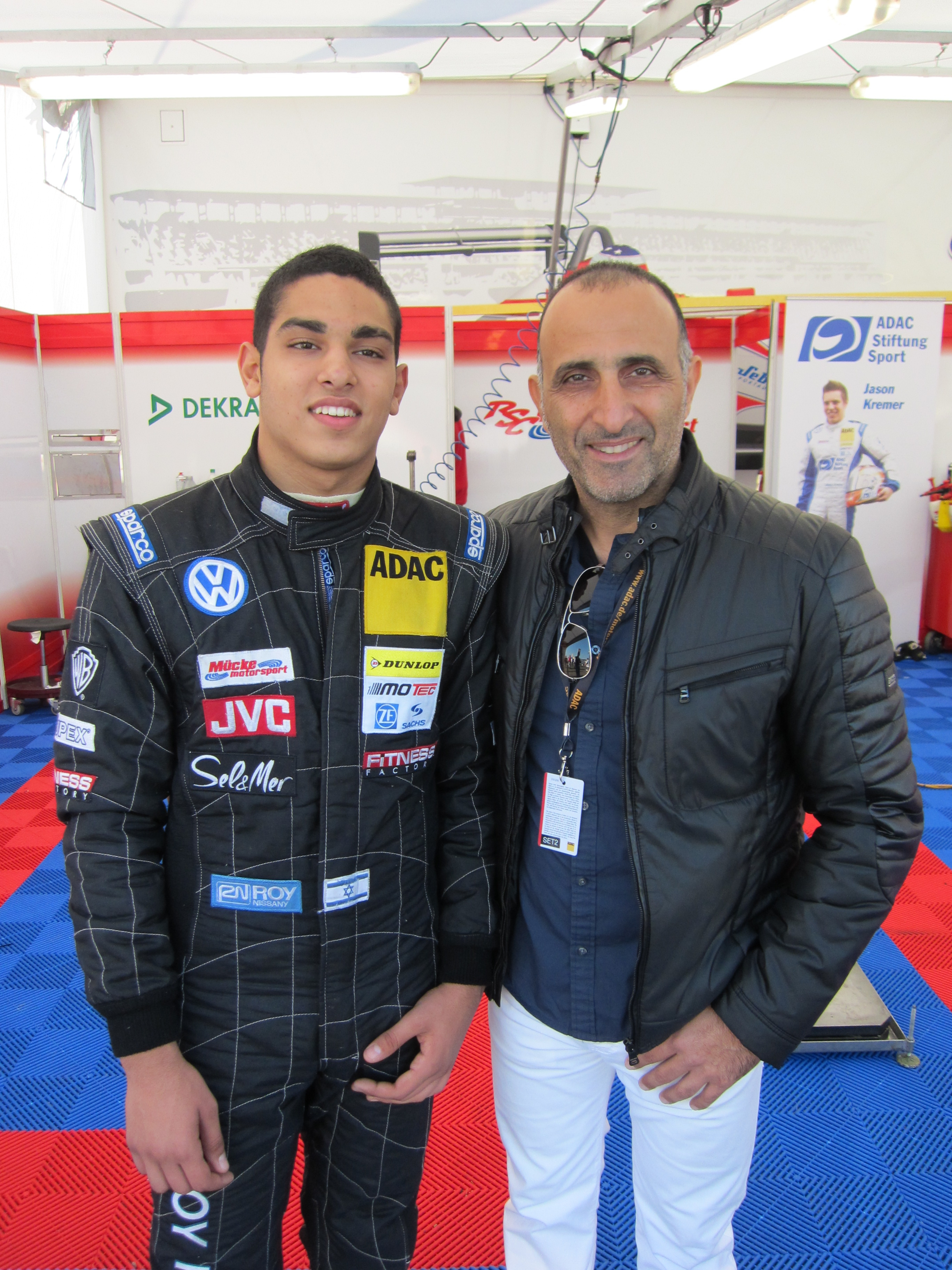
Roy and Chanoch Nissany

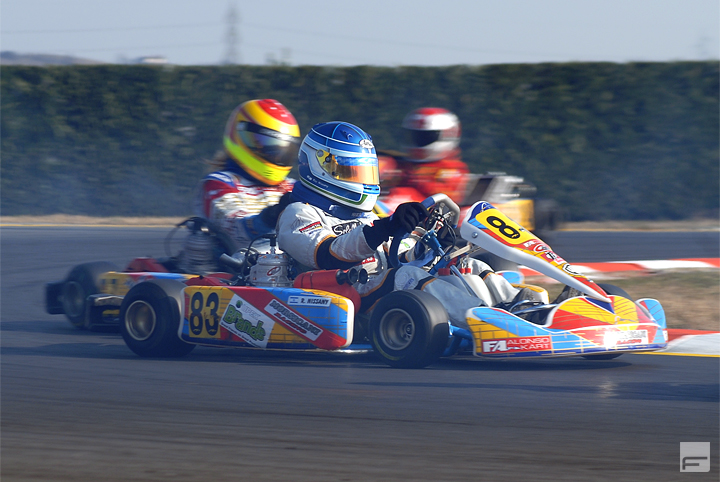
Nissany at the Winter Cup

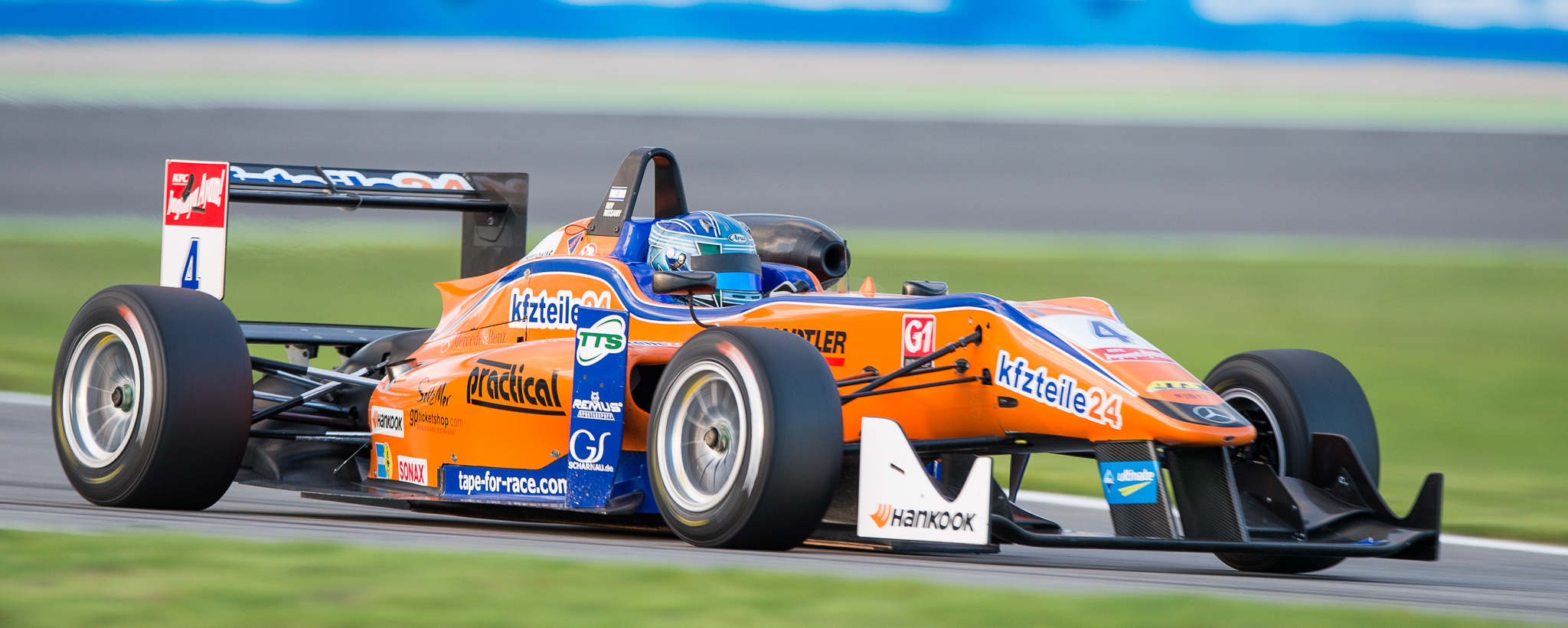
Nissany in F3 at Hockenheimring 2014

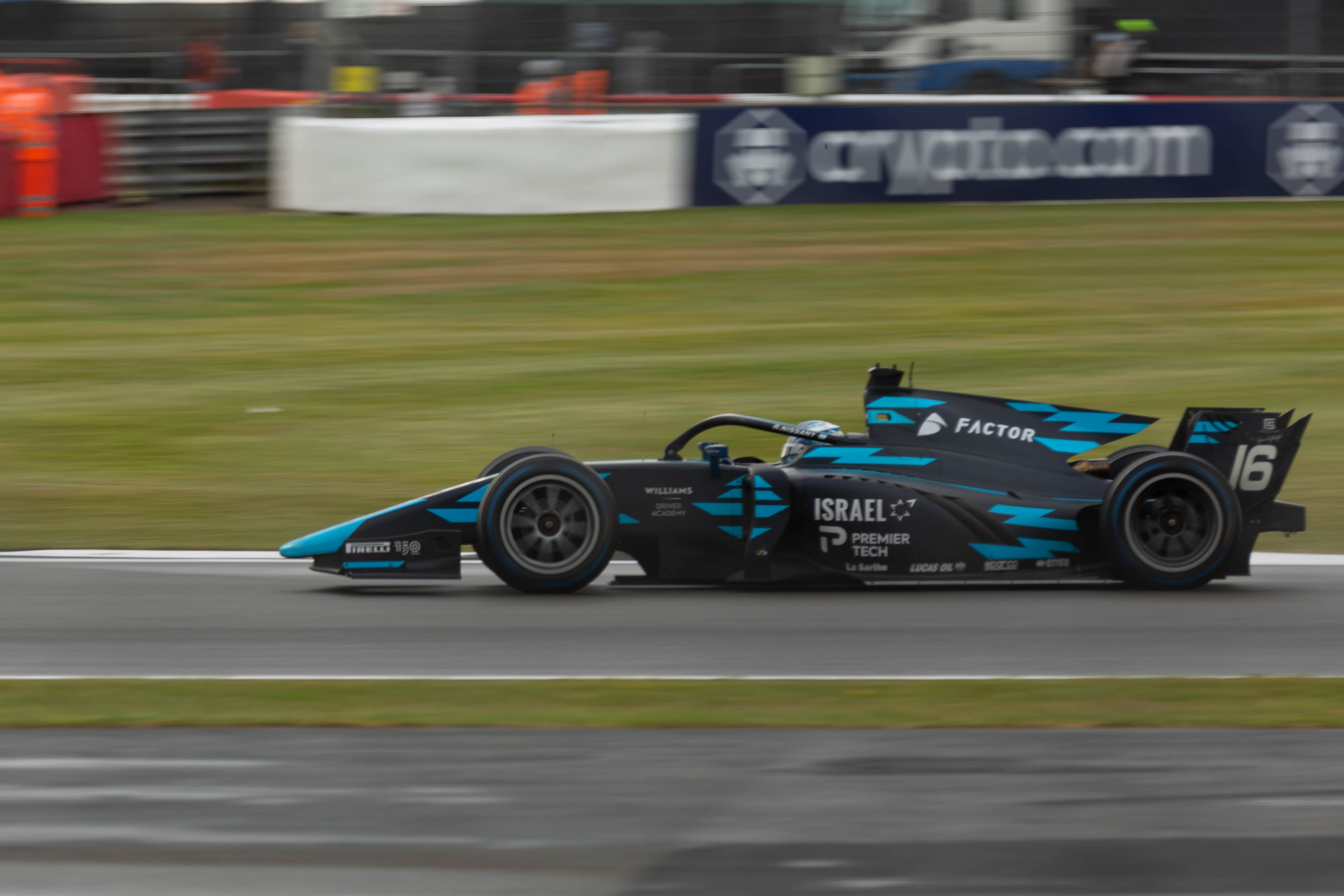
Nissany in F2 at Silverstone in 2022

== See also ==
- List of select Jewish racing drivers
