= Indy Dontje =

Dutch racing driver

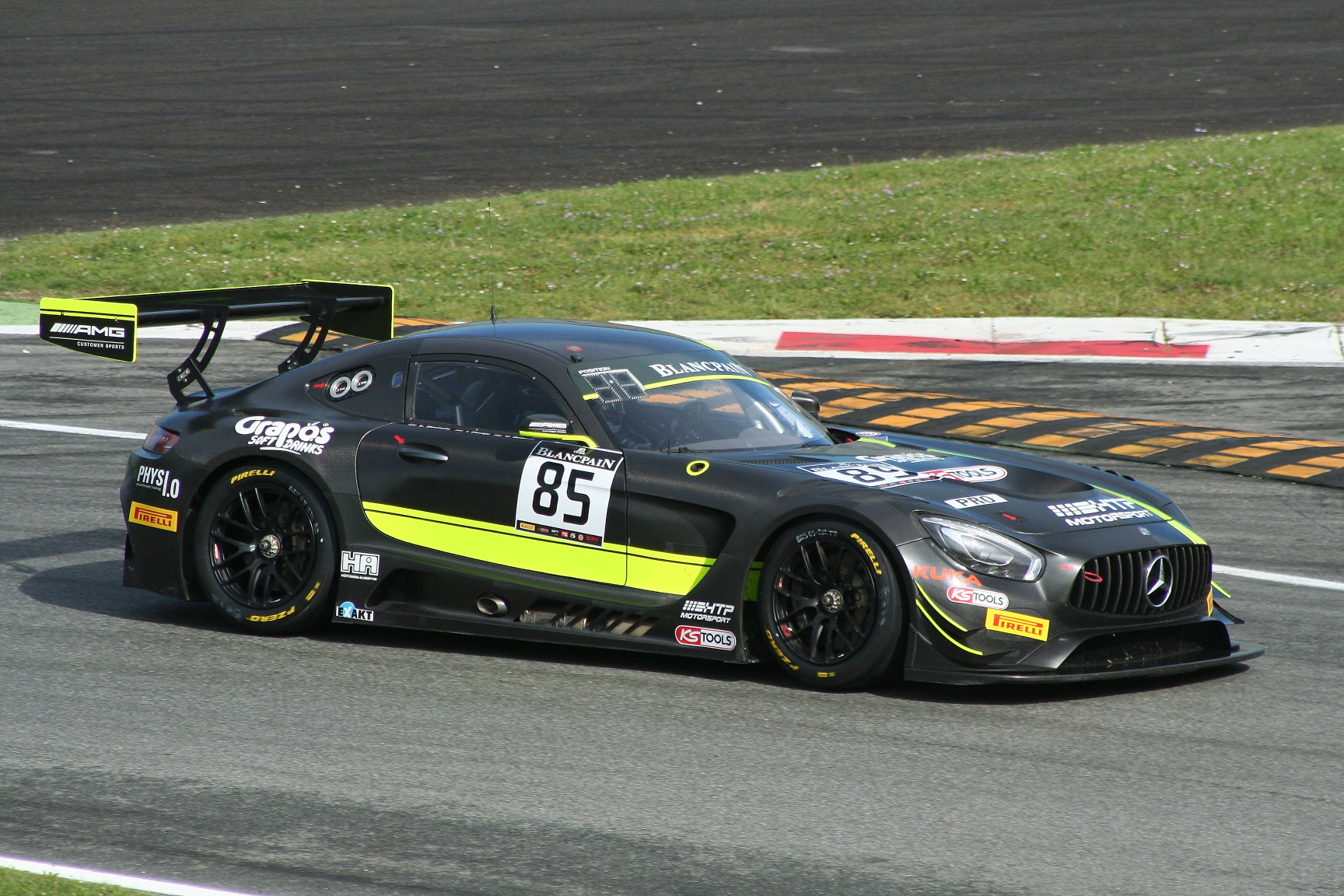
- Nationality: Dutch
- Born: 21 November 1992 (age 33) Alkmaar, North Holland
- Relatives: Milan Dontje (brother)

IMSA SportsCar Championship career
- Current team: Winward Racing
- Categorisation: FIA Silver
- Car number: 57

Previous series
- 2014 2012-2013: ATS Formel 3 Cup; ADAC Formel Masters

Indy Dontje (born 21 November 1992 in Alkmaar, North Holland) is a Dutch racing driver. After starting in ADAC Formel Masters and ATS Formel 3 Cup Dontje is now a Mercedes-Benz GT3 driver.

== Career ==
=== Karting ===
Father Arthur Dontje supported his sons Indy and Milan with their own karting team early in their careers. Arthurs chocolate company, Dobla, was the naming sponsor. Indy started racing in Rotax Max powered classes, such as MiniMax and Junior Max. After graduating into shifter karts, Dontje raced in the German Karting Championship in 2009 against other young hopefuls such as Jack Hawksworth and Hannes van Asseldonk. Later in his karting career, in 2010 and 2011, he competed in the USA in the SKUSA SuperNationals. In 2010, Dontje finished third in the S1 class. The following year, Dontje finished second in a factory supported Energy Corse kart.

=== Single seaters ===
Dontje made his single-seater debut in 2012 at age 19. Racing in the ADAC Formel Masters, Dontje joined Team Motopark, part of the Lotus F1 junior program. During the season, Dontje scored one podium finish, a third place at the Sachsenring. For 2013, Dontje remained at Team Motopark. He won the third race of the season, at Motorsport Arena Oschersleben. He won a second race at the Red Bull Ring. Dontje was the only driver to score points every single race during the season. This placed him sixth in the series standings.

For 2014, Dontje remained at the Lotus backed Team Motopark to race in the ATS Formel 3 Cup. With the German F3 championship running older machinery compared to the European F3, the German championship struggled to attract many drivers with many races being run with less than ten drivers. Dontje scored fourteen podium finishes, with a single victory, out of 23 races. Dontje won the second race during the Red Bull Ring weekend. He also competed in the 2014 Zandvoort Masters. Dontje challenged Nabil Jeffri for third but had to settle for fourth place, scoring the fastest racelap in the progress.

=== GT racing ===
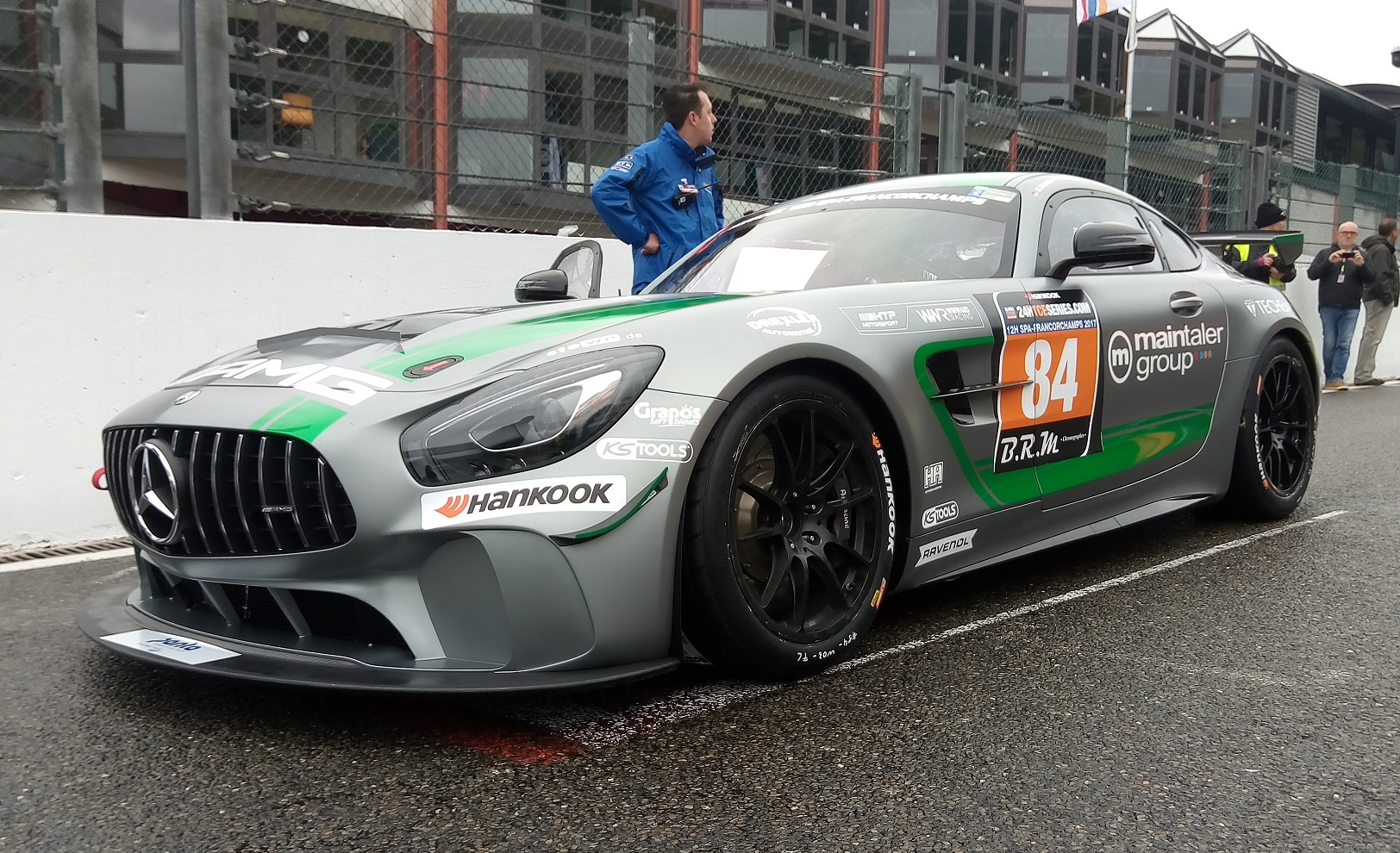
The Mercedes-AMG GT4 raced by Dontje in the 12H of Spa.

In 2015, Rowe Racing named Dontje as one of their drivers for the 2015 Blancpain Endurance Series. After the opening three races, Dontje switched to the GT Russian Team for the 2015 24 Hours of Spa and remained at the team for the season final.

With Rowe Racing switching to BMW, Dontje remained in the AMG Customer Sports program with HTP Motorsport for 2016. Dontje ran the full 2016 Blancpain GT Series Endurance Cup with teammates Luciano Bacheta and Clemens Schmid. The teams best finish was a fifth place at Silverstone. He also made his debut in the 24 Hours of Nürburgring racing with fellow Mercedes-AMG team Black Falcon. The team retired after 57 laps. For 2017, Dontje switched from the Blancpain Endurance Series to the ADAC GT Masters. With the Mercedes-AMG GT Dontje scored two podium finishes, at Zandvoort and the Sachsenring, to place thirteenth in the series championship.

In 2023, Dontje joined Winward Racing in their expanded GT World Challenge Europe Endurance Cup effort, competing alongside Philip Ellis and Russell Ward in the Gold Cup class.

== Racing Record ==
=== Career summary ===
| Season | Series | Team | Races | Wins | Poles | F/Laps | Podiums | Points | Position |
|---|---|---|---|---|---|---|---|---|---|
| 2012 | ADAC Formel Masters | Lotus | 24 | 0 | 0 | 1 | 1 | 111 | 7th |
| 2013 | ADAC Formel Masters | Lotus | 24 | 2 | 0 | 0 | 4 | 137 | 6th |
| 2014 | ATS Formel 3 Cup | Lotus | 23 | 1 | 1 | 3 | 14 | 266 | 3rd |
| 2014 | British Formula 3 International Series | Motopark | 3 | 0 | 0 | 0 | 0 | 23 | 13th |
| 2015 | Blancpain Endurance Series - Pro | Rowe Racing | 3 | 0 | 0 | 0 | 0 | 1 | 27th |
| 2015 | Blancpain Endurance Series - Pro-Am | GT Russian Team | 2 | 0 | 0 | 0 | 0 | 24 | 14th |
| 2015 | Blancpain Sprint Series | GT Russian Team | 3 | 0 | 0 | 0 | 0 | 2 | 26th |
| 2015 | 24H Series - 997 | HRT Performance | 1 | | | | | | |
| 2016 | Blancpain GT Series Endurance Cup | HTP Motorsport | 5 | 0 | 0 | 0 | 0 | 10 | 34th |
| 2016 | 24H Series - A6 | HTP Motorsport | 1 | | | | | | |
| 2016 | 24H Series - A6 | Black Falcon | 1 | | | | | | |
| 2016 | 24 Hours of Nürburgring - SP9 | Black Falcon | 1 | 0 | 0 | 0 | 0 | —N/a | DNF |
| 2017 | Blancpain GT Series Endurance Cup | Mann-Filter Team HTP Motorsport | 5 | 0 | 0 | 0 | 0 | 0 | NC |
| 2017 | 24 Hours of Nürburgring - SP9 | Mann-Filter Team HTP Motorsport | 1 | 0 | 0 | 0 | 0 | —N/a | 14th |
| 2017 | ADAC GT Masters | Mercedes-AMG Team HTP Motorsport | 14 | 0 | 0 | 0 | 2 | 66 | 13th |
| 2018 | Continental Tire SportsCar Challenge - GS | Winward Racing/HTP Motorsport | 6 | | | | | | |
| 2018 | International GT Open | Winward Racing/HTP Motorsport | 2 | 0 | 0 | 0 | 0 | 0 | NC |
| 2018 | ADAC GT Masters | Mann-Filter Team HTP | 14 | 1 | 0 | 0 | 2 | 84 | 5th |
| 2018 | 24H GT Series - A6 | HTP Motorsport | 1 | | | | | | |
| 2018 | 24 Hours of Nürburgring - SP9 | Mercedes-AMG Team Mann-Filter | 1 | 0 | 0 | 0 | 0 | —N/a | 16th |
| 2019 | Michelin Pilot Challenge - GS | Winward Racing/HTP Motorsport | 6 | 1 | 1 | 0 | 1 | | |
| 2019 | International GT Open - Pro-Am | Winward Racing | 6 | 1 | 0 | 0 | 4 | 32 | 8th |
| 2019 | ADAC GT Masters | Mann-Filter Team HTP | 14 | 1 | 1 | 0 | 3 | 145 | 3rd |
| 2019 | 24H GT Series - A6 | Mann-Filter Team HTP | 1 | | | | | | |
| 2019 | Blancpain GT Series Endurance Cup | Rinaldi Racing | 1 | 0 | 0 | 0 | 0 | 0 | NC |
| 2019 | 24 Hours of Nürburgring - SP9 | Wochenspiegel Team Monschau | 1 | 0 | 0 | 0 | 0 | —N/a | 11th |
| 2020 | Michelin Pilot Challenge - GS | Winward Racing/HTP Motorsport | 6 | 0 | 1 | 0 | 2 | | |
| 2020 | GT World Challenge America - Silver | Winward Racing | 2 | 0 | 1 | 0 | 2 | 36 | 3rd |
| 2020 | ADAC GT Masters | Mann-Filter Team HTP-Winward | 14 | 0 | 0 | 0 | 1 | 87 | 9th |
| 2020 | GT World Challenge Europe Endurance Cup | HTP Motorsport | 1 | 0 | 0 | 0 | 0 | 0 | NC |
| 2020 | 24H GT Series - GT3 | HTP Winward Motorsport | 2 | | | | | | |
| 2021 | IMSA SportsCar Championship - GTD | HTP Winward Motorsport | 1 | 1 | 0 | 0 | 1 | 376 | 43rd |
| 2021 | Michelin Pilot Challenge - GS | Winward Racing | 7 | 0 | 0 | 0 | 2 | 1720 | 15th |
| 2021 | GT World Challenge Europe Endurance Cup | Haupt Racing Team | 2 | 0 | 0 | 0 | 0 | 0 | NC |
| 2021 | ADAC GT4 Germany | Dörr Motorsport | 2 | | | | | | |
| 2021 | 24 Hours of Nürburgring - SP9 | Wochenspiegel Team Monschau by Phoenix Racing | 1 | 0 | 0 | 0 | 0 | —N/a | 13th |
| 2022 | ADAC GT4 Germany | Dörr Motorsport | 12 | 1 | 3 | 1 | 5 | 140 | 3rd |
| 2022 | 24 Hours of Nürburgring - SP8T | Dörr Motorsport | 1 | 1 | 1 | 0 | 1 | —N/a | 1st |
| 2022 | 24H GT Series - GT3 | Al Manar Racing by HRT | 1 | | | | | | |
| 2022 | 24H GT Series - GT3 | Wochenspiegel Team Monschau | 2 | | | | | | |
| 2023 | IMSA SportsCar Championship - GTD | Winward Racing | 4 | 0 | 0 | 0 | 0 | 707 | 36th |
| 2023 | GT World Challenge Europe Endurance Cup | Winward Racing | 5 | 0 | 0 | 0 | 0 | 0 | NC |
| 2023 | 24 Hours of Nürburgring - SP9 Pro-Am | WTM by Rinaldi Racing | 1 | 1 | 0 | 0 | 1 | —N/a | 1st |
| 2024 | IMSA SportsCar Championship - GTD | Winward Racing | 5 | 3 | 0 | 0 | 3 | 1651 | 21st |
| 2024 | GT World Challenge Europe Endurance Cup | Uno Racing Team with Landgraf | 1 | 0 | 0 | 0 | 0 | 0 | NC |
| 2024 | 24 Hours of Nürburgring - SP9 Pro-Am | Lionspeed GP | 1 | 1 | 1 | 0 | 1 | —N/a | 1st |
| 2025 | IMSA SportsCar Championship - GTD | Winward Racing | 5 | 1 | 0 | 0 | 1 | 1442 | 17th |
| 2025 | GT World Challenge Europe Endurance Cup | Winward Racing | 1 | 0 | 0 | 0 | 0 | 0 | NC |
| 2026 | IMSA SportsCar Championship - GTD | Winward Racing | 5 | 3 | 1 | 0 | 3 | 1464 | 18th |
| 2026 | GT World Challenge America - Pro-Am | TR3 Racing | 1 | 0 | 0 | 0 | 0 | 0 | NC† |

=== Complete ADAC Formel Masters results ===
(key) (Races in bold indicate pole position) (Races in italics indicate fastest lap)

| Year | Team | 1 | 2 | 3 | 4 | 5 | 6 | 7 | 8 | 9 | 10 | 11 | 12 | 13 | 14 | 15 | 16 | 17 | 18 | 19 | 20 | 21 | 22 | 23 | 24 | DC | Points |
|---|---|---|---|---|---|---|---|---|---|---|---|---|---|---|---|---|---|---|---|---|---|---|---|---|---|---|---|
| 2012 | Lotus | OSC; 1; 14 | OSC; 2; 12 | OSC; 3; 14 | ZAN; 1; 8 | ZAN; 2; 4 | ZAN; 3; 8 | SAC; 1; 3 | SAC; 2; 5 | SAC; 3 C | NÜR1; 1; 12 | NÜR1; 2; 9 | NÜR1; 3; 6 | RBR; 1; 7 | RBR; 2; 10 | RBR; 3; 10 | LAU; 1; 12 | LAU; 2; 5 | LAU; 3 Ret | NÜR2; 1; 6 | NÜR2; 2; 4 | NÜR2; 3; 11 | HOC; 1; 7 | HOC; 2; 5 | HOC; 3; 5 | 7th | 111 |
| 2013 | Lotus | OSC; 1; 4 | OSC; 2; 7 | OSC; 3; 1 | SPA; 1; 8 | SPA; 2; 10 | SPA; 3; 5 | SAC; 1; 3 | SAC; 2; 4 | SAC; 3; 6 | NÜR; 1; 8 | NÜR; 2; 9 | NÜR; 3; 6 | RBR; 1; 6 | RBR; 2; 5 | RBR; 3; 1 | LAU; 1; 10 | LAU; 2; 9 | LAU; 3; 10 | SVK; 1; 9 | SVK; 2; 8 | SVK; 3; 6 | HOC; 1; 10 | HOC; 2; 7 | HOC; 3; 3 | 6th | 137 |

=== Complete German Formula Three Championship results ===
| Year | Entrant | Chassis | Engine | 1 | 2 | 3 | 4 | 5 | 6 | 7 | 8 | 9 | 10 | 11 | 12 | 13 | 14 | 15 | 16 | 17 | 18 | 19 | 20 | 21 | 22 | 23 | 24 | Pos | Points |
|---|---|---|---|---|---|---|---|---|---|---|---|---|---|---|---|---|---|---|---|---|---|---|---|---|---|---|---|---|---|
| 2014 | Lotus | Dallara F311 | Volkswagen | OSC; 1; 2 | OSC; 2; 2 | OSC; 2; 3 | LAU1; 1; 2 | LAU1; 2; 2 | LAU1; 3; 4 | RBR; 1; 3 | RBR; 2; 1 | RBR; 3; 3 | HOC1; 1; 3 | HOC1; 2; 3 | HOC1; 3; 9 | NÜR; 1; 12† | NÜR; 2; 4 | NÜR; 3; 4 | LAU2; 1; 3 | LAU2; 2 C | LAU2; 3; 6 | SAC; 1; 4 | SAC; 2; 7 | SAC; 3; 4 | **HOC2**; **1**; 2 | HOC2; 2; 2 | HOC2; 3; 2 | 3rd | 266 |

=== Complete GT World Challenge Europe results ===
==== GT World Challenge Europe Sprint Cup ====
| Year | Team | Car | Class | 1 | 2 | 3 | 4 | 5 | 6 | 7 | 8 | 9 | 10 | 11 | 12 | 13 | 14 | Pos. | Pts |
|---|---|---|---|---|---|---|---|---|---|---|---|---|---|---|---|---|---|---|---|
| 2015 | GT Russian Team | Mercedes-Benz SLS AMG GT3 | Pro-Am | NOG; QR | NOG; CR | BRH; QR | BRH; CR | ZOL; QR | ZOL; CR | MOS; QR | MOS; CR | ALG; QR | ALG; CR | MIS; QR | MIS; CR | **ZAN**; **QR**; 13 | ZAN; CR; 9 | 6th | 34 |

==== GT World Challenge Europe Endurance Cup ====
| Year | Team | Car | Class | 1 | 2 | 3 | 4 | 5 | 6 | 7 | Pos. | Points |
|---|---|---|---|---|---|---|---|---|---|---|---|---|
| 2015 | Rowe Racing | Mercedes-Benz SLS AMG GT3 | Pro | MNZ; 15 | SIL; 11 | LEC; Ret | | | | | 27th | 1 |
| 2015 | GT Russian Team | Mercedes-Benz SLS AMG GT3 | Pro-Am | | | | SPA; 6H; 17 | SPA; 12H; 12 | SPA; 24H; Ret | NÜR; 20 | 14th | 24 |
| 2016 | HTP Motorsport | Mercedes-AMG GT3 | Pro | MNZ; 21 | SIL; 5 | LEC; 40 | SPA; 6H; 47 | SPA; 12H; 40 | SPA; 24H; 21 | NÜR; 25 | 34th | 10 |
| 2017 | MANN-FILTER Team HTP Motorsport | Mercedes-AMG GT3 | Pro | MNZ; 14 | SIL; Ret | LEC; 51 | SPA; 6H; 47 | SPA; 12H; 51 | SPA; 24H; Ret | CAT; 40 | NC | 0 |
| 2019 | Rinaldi Racing | Ferrari 488 GT3 | Silver | MNZ | SIL | LEC | SPA; 6H; 57 | SPA; 12H; 61 | SPA; 24H; Ret | CAT | NC | 0 |
| 2020 | HTP Motorsport | Mercedes-AMG GT3 Evo | Silver | IMO | NÜR | SPA; 6H; 36 | SPA; 12H; 27 | SPA; 24H; 21 | LEC | | 15th | 27 |
| 2021 | Haupt Racing Team | Mercedes-AMG GT3 Evo | Silver | MNZ | LEC | SPA; 6H; 54 | SPA; 12H; 54 | SPA; 24H; Ret | NÜR | CAT; 42 | NC | 0 |
| 2023 | Winward Racing | Mercedes-AMG GT3 Evo | Gold | MNZ; 23 | **LEC**; Ret | SPA; 6H; 56 | SPA; 12H; 37 | SPA; 24H; 38 | NÜR; Ret | CAT; 15 | 7th | 49 |
| 2024 | Uno Racing Team with Landgraf | Mercedes-AMG GT3 Evo | Pro-Am | LEC | SPA; 6H; 55 | SPA; 12H; 51 | SPA; 24H; 36 | NÜR | MNZ | JED | NC | 0 |
| 2025 | Winward Racing | Mercedes-AMG GT3 Evo | Gold | LEC | MNZ | SPA; 6H; 26 | SPA; 12H; 59† | SPA; 24H; Ret | NÜR | CAT | 18th | 5 |

=== Complete 24 Hours of Nürburgring results ===
| Year | Team | Co-Drivers | Car | Class | Laps | Pos. | Class Pos. |
|---|---|---|---|---|---|---|---|
| 2016 | (Germany) Black Falcon | (United Kingdom) Rob Huff (Germany) "Gerwin" (Saudi Arabia) Abdulaziz Al Faisal | Mercedes-AMG GT3 | SP9 | 57 | DNF | DNF |
| 2017 | (Germany) Mann-Filter Team HTP Motorsport | (Germany) Kenneth Heyer (Germany) Bernd Schneider (Germany) Patrick Assenheimer | Mercedes-AMG GT3 | SP9 | 155 | 14th | 14th |
| 2018 | (Germany) Mercedes-AMG Team Mann Filter | (Germany) Maximilian Götz (Germany) Christian Hohenadel (Netherlands) Renger van der Zande | Mercedes-AMG GT3 | SP9 | 129 | 17th | 16th |
| 2019 | (Germany) Wochenspiegel Team Monschau | (Germany) Hendrik Still (Germany) Georg Weiss (Germany) Leonard Weiss | Ferrari 488 GT3 | SP9 | 152 | 12th | 11th |
| 2021 | (Germany) Wochenspiegel Team Monschau by Phoenix Racing | (Germany) Daniel Keilwitz (Germany) Jochen Krumbach (Germany) Georg Weiss | Ferrari 488 GT3 | SP9 | 58 | 13th | 13th |
| 2022 | (Germany) Dörr Motorsport | (Germany) Phil Dörr (Germany) Nick Hancke (Germany) Moritz Wiskirchen | Aston Martin Vantage AMR GT4 | SP8T | 143 | 22nd | **1st** |
| 2023 | (Germany) WTM by Rinaldi Racing | (Germany) Daniel Keilwitz (Germany) Jochen Krumbach (Germany) Leonard Weiss | Ferrari 296 GT3 | SP9 Pro-Am | 161 | 7th | **1st** |
| 2024 | (Germany) Lionspeed GP | (Hong Kong) Antares Au (Germany) Patrick Kolb (Switzerland) Patric Niederhauser | Porsche 911 GT3 R (992) | SP9 Pro-Am | 50 | 9th | **1st** |

=== Complete ADAC GT Masters results ===
| Year | Team | Car | 1 | 2 | 3 | 4 | 5 | 6 | 7 | 8 | 9 | 10 | 11 | 12 | 13 | 14 | Pos. | Points |
|---|---|---|---|---|---|---|---|---|---|---|---|---|---|---|---|---|---|---|
| 2017 | Mercedes-AMG Team HTP Motorsport | Mercedes-AMG GT3 | OSC; 1; 15 | OSC; 2; 6 | LAU; 1; 4 | LAU; 2; 10 | RBR; 1; 13 | RBR; 2; 7 | ZAN; 1; 3 | ZAN; 2; 16 | NÜR; 1; 12 | NÜR; 2; 7 | SAC; 1; 2 | SAC; 2 Ret | HOC; 1; 11 | HOC; 2; 11 | 13th | 66 |
| 2018 | Mann-Filter Team HTP | Mercedes-AMG GT3 | OSC; 1; 6 | OSC; 2; 27 | MST; 1; 4 | MST; 2; 16 | RBR; 1; 9 | RBR; 2; 16 | NÜR; 1; 1 | NÜR; 2; 17 | ZAN; 1; 26 | ZAN; 2; 5 | SAC; 1; 4 | SAC; 2; 22 | HOC; 1; 15 | HOC; 2; 3 | 5th | 84 |
| 2019 | Mann-Filter Team HTP | Mercedes-AMG GT3 | OSC; 1; 9 | OSC; 2; 8 | MST; 1; 5 | MST; 2; 6 | RBR; 1 Ret | RBR; 2; 2 | ZAN; 1 Ret | ZAN; 2; 21 | NÜR; 1; 6 | NÜR; 2; 5 | HOC; 1; 2 | HOC; 2; 7 | **SAC**; **1**; 1 | SAC; 2; 5 | **3rd** | **145** |
| 2020 | Mann-Filter Team HTP-Winward | Mercedes-AMG GT3 Evo | LAU; 1; 7 | LAU; 2; 8 | NÜR; 1; 26 | NÜR; 2; 14 | HOC; 1; 9 | HOC; 2; 4 | SAC; 1; 18 | SAC; 2 Ret | RBR; 1; 13 | RBR; 2; 16 | LAU; 1; 2 | LAU; 2; 5 | OSC; 1; 10 | OSC; 2; 9 | 9th | 87 |

=== Complete IMSA SportsCar Championship results ===
(key) (Races in bold indicate pole position; results in italics indicate fastest lap)

| Year | Team | Class | Make | Engine | 1 | 2 | 3 | 4 | 5 | 6 | 7 | 8 | 9 | 10 | 11 | 12 | Pos. | Points |
|---|---|---|---|---|---|---|---|---|---|---|---|---|---|---|---|---|---|---|
| 2021 | HTP Winward Motorsport | GTD | Mercedes-AMG GT3 Evo | Mercedes-AMG M159 6.2 L V8 | DAY; 1 | SEB | MDO | DET | WGL | WGL | LIM | ELK | LGA | LBH | VIR | PET | 43rd | 376 |
| 2023 | Winward Racing | GTD | Mercedes-AMG GT3 Evo | Mercedes-AMG M159 6.2 L V8 | DAY; 13 | SEB; 18 | LBH | LGA | WGL; 20 | MOS | LIM | ELK | VIR | IMS | PET; 9 | | 36th | 707 |
| 2024 | Winward Racing | GTD | Mercedes-AMG GT3 Evo | Mercedes-AMG M159 6.2 L V8 | DAY; 1 | SEB; 1 | LBH | LGA | WGL; 1 | MOS | ELK | VIR | IMS; 5 | PET; 8 | | | 21st | 1651 |
| 2025 | Winward Racing | GTD | Mercedes-AMG GT3 Evo | Mercedes-AMG M159 6.2 L V8 | DAY; 4 | SEB; 1 | LBH | LGA | WGL; 16 | MOS | ELK | VIR | IMS; 5 | PET; 5 | | | 17th | 1442 |
| 2026 | Winward Racing | GTD | Mercedes-AMG GT3 Evo | Mercedes-AMG M159 6.2 L V8 | DAY; 1 | SEB; 18 | LBH | LGA | WGL; 15 | MOS | ELK; 1 | VIR | IMS | **PET**; 1 | | | 18th | 1464 |
