= Nicolas Beer =

Danish racing driver

- Nationality: Danish
- Born: 5 April 1996 (age 30) Hellerup, Denmark

European Formula 3 career
- Debut season: 2015
- Current team: EuroInternational
- Car number: 15

Previous series
- 2014; 2014; 2012; 2012; 2012-13; 2012; 2007, 2009-11: BRDC Formula 4 Championship; ATS Formel 3 Cup; Formula Ford Denmark; Formula Ford NEZ; ADAC Formel Masters; Austria Formel 1600 Cup; Karting

Championship titles
- 2007, 2010: Karting

Nicolas Beer (born 5 April 1996) is a Danish former racing driver.

== Career ==
=== Karting ===
Beer began karting in 2007 and raced in many different championships for the majority of his career. He ended his karting career in 2011, moving into single-seaters.

=== Single-Seaters ===
Beer began his single-seaters career in the Austrian Formel 1600 Cup, after this one-off appearance, he raced in Formula Ford NEZ, Formula Ford Denmark and ADAC Formel Masters. He raced a full season in the ADAC Formel Masters in 2013, ending 4th in the standings. In 2014, he raced in ATS Formel 3 Cup and BRDC Formula 4 Championship.

In March 2015, it was announced that Beer would make his European Formula 3 debut with EuroInternational.

== Racing record ==
=== Career summary ===
Season	Series	Team	Races	Wins	Poles	F/Laps	Podiums	Points	Position
2012	Austria Formel 1600 Cup	HS Engineering	2	2	?	?	2	0	NC
2012	ADAC Formel Masters	HS Engineering	12	0	0	0	0	13	16th
2012	Formula LO	HS Engineering	2	2	0	0	2	0	NC†
2012	Formula Ford NEZ	Fluid Motorsport	1	0	0	0	0	0	NC
2012	Formula Ford Denmark	Fluid Motorsport	7	2	2	5	2	58	12th
2013	ADAC Formel Masters	Neuhauser Racing	24	2	1	5	8	217	4th
2014	German Formula Three Championship	EuroInternational	3	0	0	0	0	0	NC†
2014	BRDC Formula 4 Championship	Sean Walkinshaw Racing – Caterham F1	11	0	0	0	1	87	20th
2015	FIA Formula 3 European Championship	EuroInternational	4	0	0	0	0	0	31st
2017	F4 Danish Championship	Vesti Motorsport	9	2	0	2	6	120	7th

† As Beer was a guest driver, he was ineligible to score points.
