= Beitske Visser =

Dutch racing driver

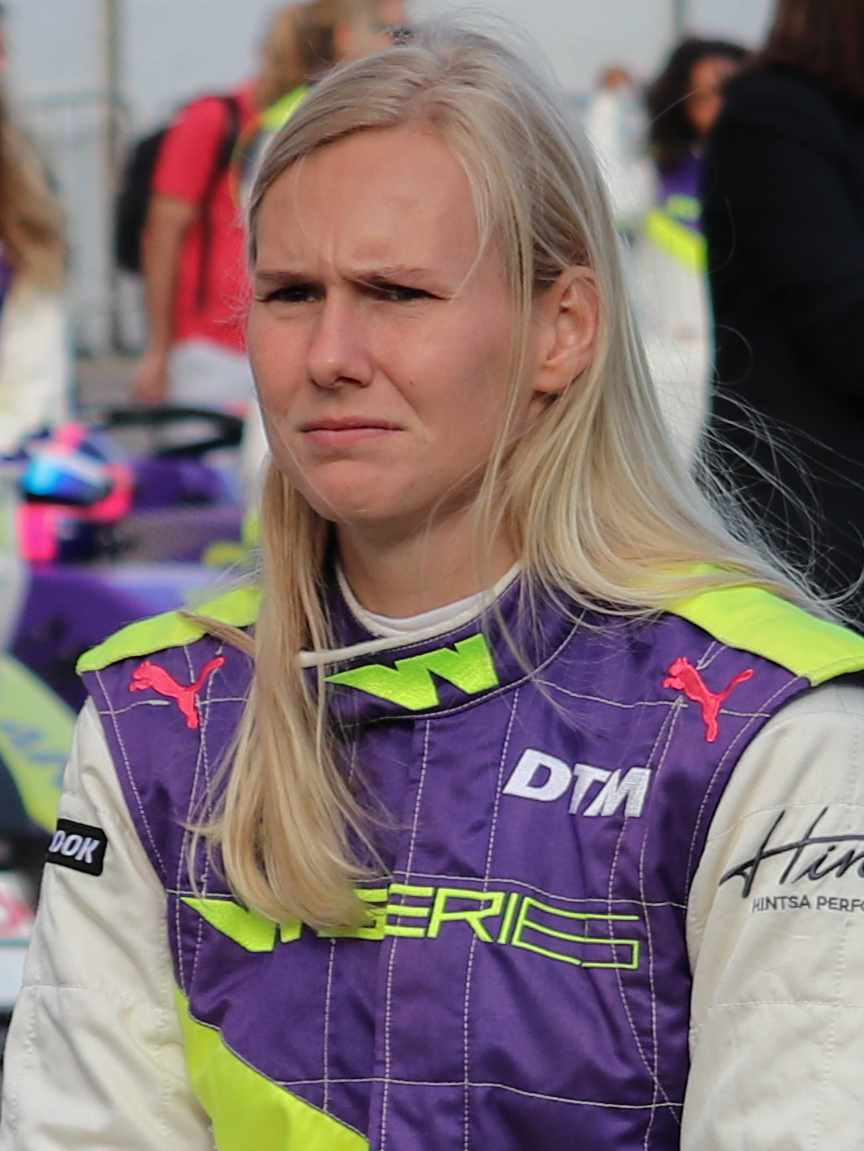
- Visser in 2019
- Nationality: Dutch
- Born: 10 March 1995 (age 31) Dronten, Netherlands

W Series career
- Debut season: 2019
- Current team: Sirin Racing
- Categorisation: FIA Silver
- Car number: 95
- Starts: 20
- Wins: 2
- Podiums: 7
- Poles: 1
- Fastest laps: 2
- Best finish: 2nd in 2019 and 2022

Previous series
- 2023 2019,2021-2022 2021 2020 2019 2018 2014-16 2014-15 2012–13: Prototype Cup Germany; W Series; World Endurance Championship; European Le Mans Series; International GT Open; GT4 European Series; Formula V8 3.5 Series; GP3 Series; ADAC Formel Masters

Beitske Visser (born 10 March 1995) is a Dutch racing driver. She has raced in kart, single-seater, GT and prototype series.

== Career ==
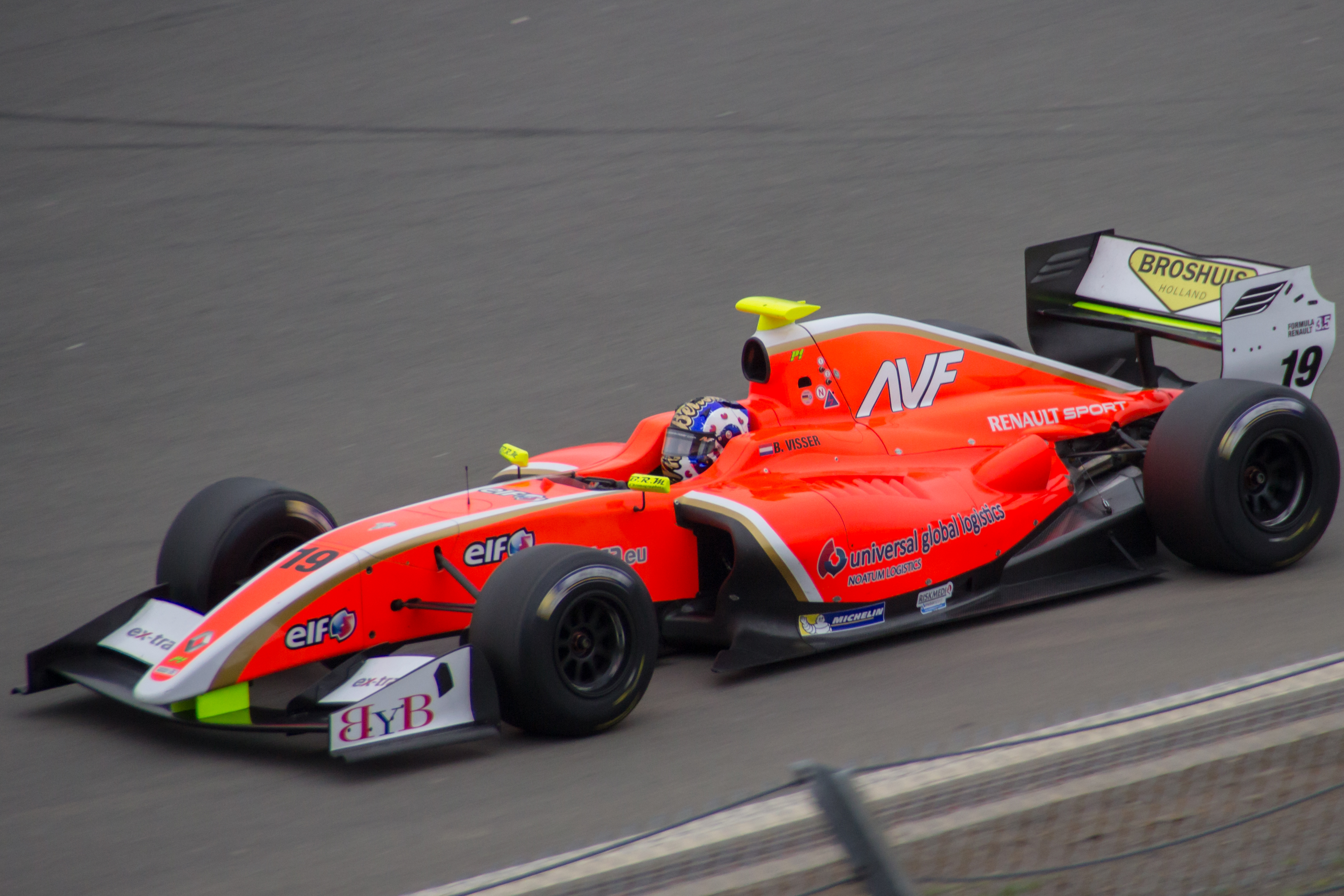
Visser competing in Formula Renault 3.5 in 2014

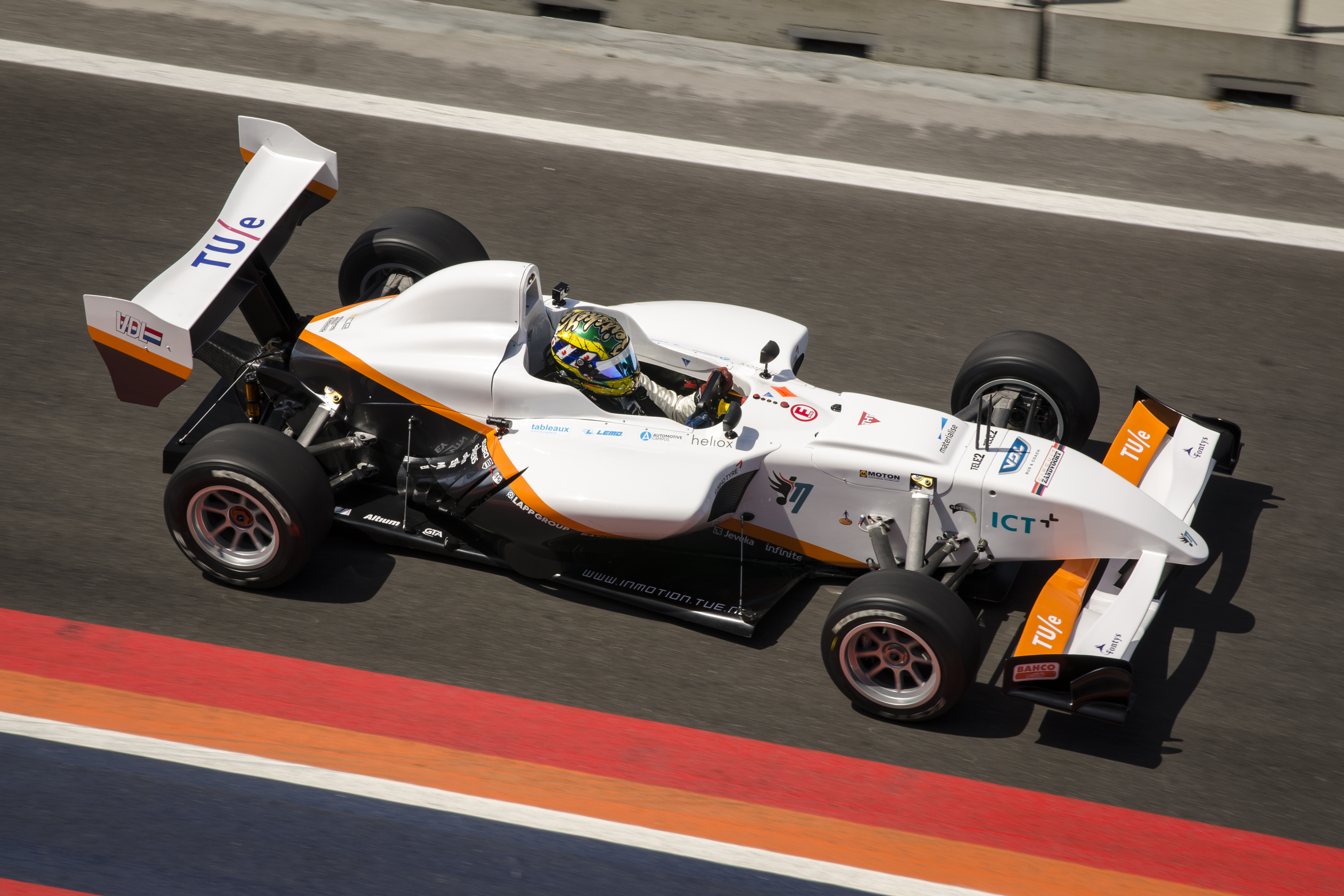
Visser testing an electric open-wheeler, June 2017

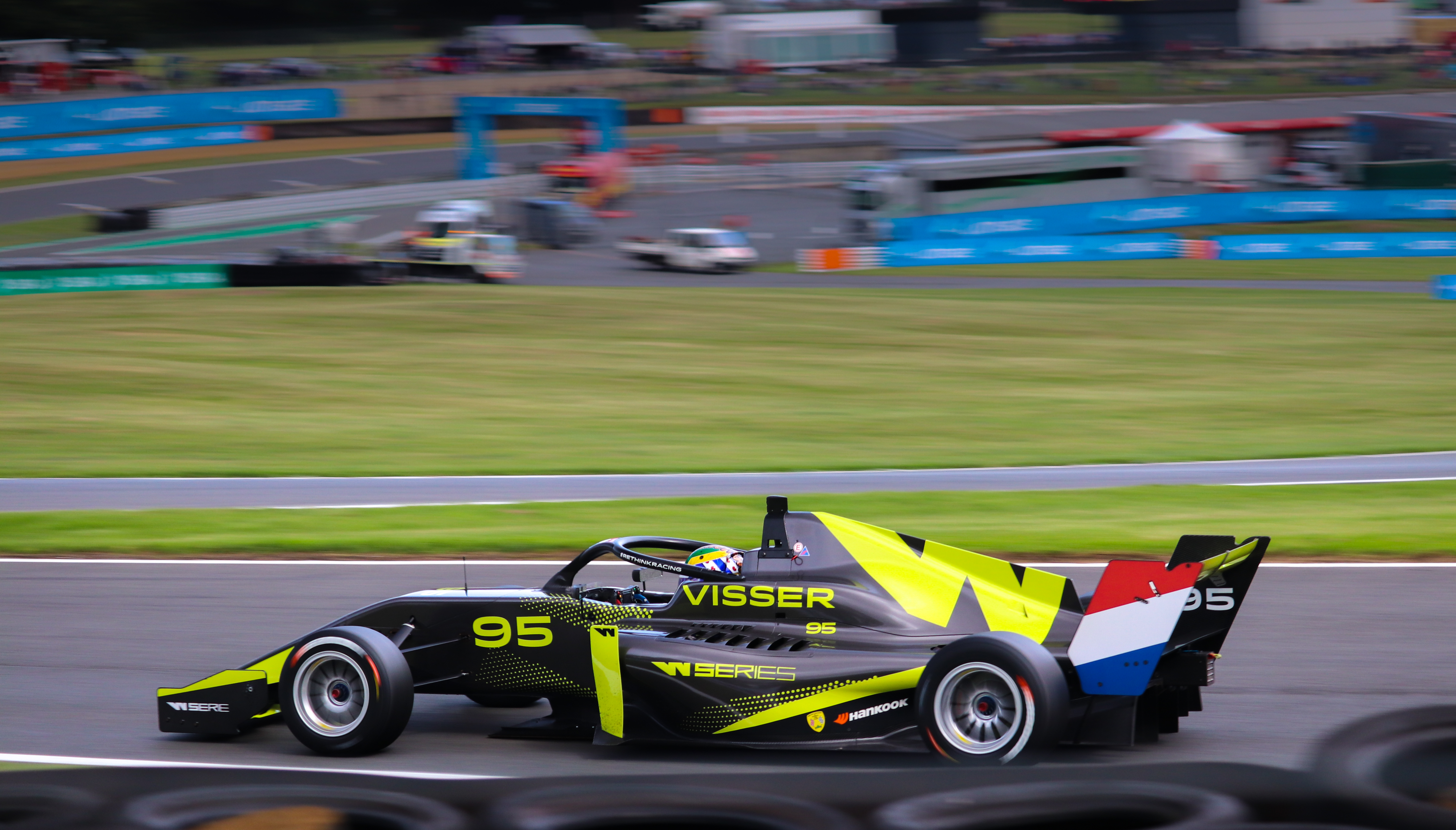
Visser in action at the 2019 W Series Brands Hatch round

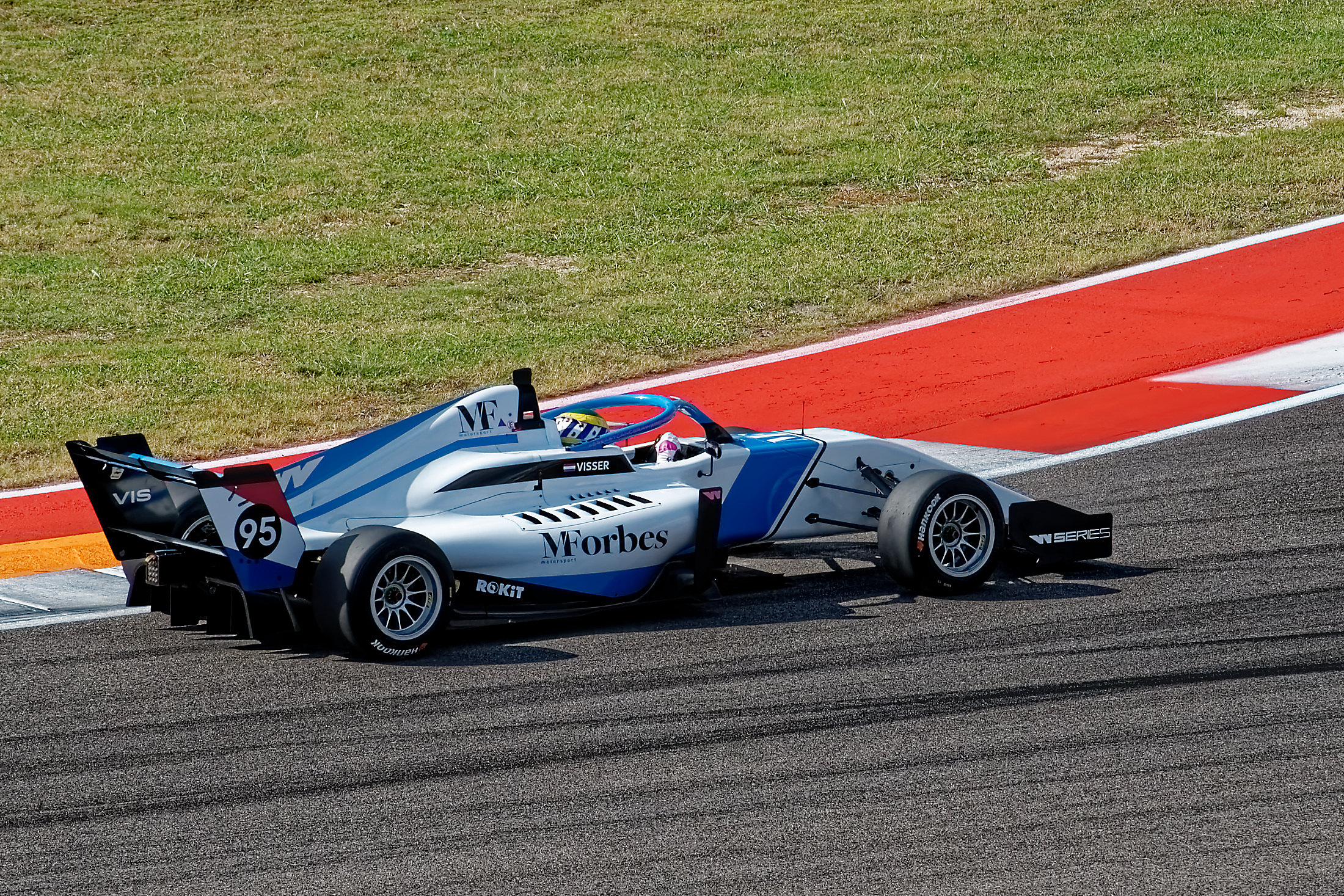
Visser competing in W Series in Austin, Texas in October 2021

Visser competing at Brands Hatch in 2026

=== Karting ===
Born in Dronten, Visser began karting in 2007 and raced in various European and International championships, working her way up from the junior ranks to progress through to the KZ1 category by 2011, when she finished in tenth position in the CIK-FIA European KZ1 Championship.

=== First car race ===
On 6 August 2011, Visser made her car racing debut in the Supercar Challenge at Assen Circuit, in the GT class, driving a Praga R4S. Despite a 25-second penalty, she passed Roger Grouwels towards the end of the race she claimed her first car racing win in her race debut.

=== Open-wheel racing ===
ADAC Formel Masters

2012 saw Visser make her début in the ADAC Formel Masters championship with Lotus, also known as Motopark Academy. Visser finished eighth in the championship with wins at Zandvoort and EuroSpeedway Lausitz, and another ten point-scoring finishes.

Visser joined the Red Bull Junior Team racing academy at the start of the 2013 season but was dropped from the program at the end of the season.

Visser remained in the series with the team for the 2013 season; she won one race during the season, at the Sachsenring, and finished eighth again, in the final championship standings.

GP3 Series

In 2014, Visser competed in the opening round of the GP3 Series with Hilmer Motorsport. She also competed in the Spa-Francorchamps round of the 2015 season with Trident.

Formula Renault 3.5 Series

As well as the GP3 Series, Visser graduated to the Formula Renault 3.5 Series in 2014, joining AVF. She scored her first point during Race 1 at Spa-Francorchamps. She completed two seasons with Adrian Valles' team, before switching to Teo Martín Motorsport in 2016. She scored a best result of fifth (Jerez 2016) and a best finish of 13th in the championship (2016).

Hiatus

Visser left Formula V8 at the end of 2016, and took up a development role with a student team from Eindhoven University of Technology (Automotive Technology InMotion), who were developing an electric open-wheeler. In June 2017, the team broke the EV lap record at Zandvoort, going 16 seconds faster than the previous best.

Formula E

Visser became, alongside Bruno Spengler, one of the test and reserve drivers for Andretti Autosport ahead of the 2018–19 Formula E season. Visser also competed in the 2024–25 Season pre-season Women's test in Jarama for DS Penske, and was classified 6th.

W Series

Visser was accepted into the qualifying stages of the 2019 W Series to be held at the Wachauring in January 2019, and subsequently qualified as one of the 18 regular drivers. She finished second in the championship to Jamie Chadwick with four podiums including a win at Zolder.

Visser was set to contest the 2020 championship before it was cancelled in response to the COVID-19 pandemic. A 10-event eSports series was held on iRacing in its place, with Visser taking the championship with a round remaining.

Visser was eighth in the 2021 W Series, and second in the 2022 W Series.

=== Endurance racing ===
GT4

In mid-2017, Visser was admitted into the BMW Junior Driver programme, where she was entered into the 2017 GT4 European Series Southern Cup alongside German driver Dennis Marschall. The pairing won the penultimate round of the campaign in Barcelona. She and Marschall will continue in the class in 2018.

LMP2

Visser made her prototype début in the 2020 European Le Mans Series for Signature Team, replacing regular driver Katherine Legge after she was injured testing the teams' Oreca 07 at Circuit Paul Ricard. She finished sixtĚh in the 4 Hours of Spa-Francorchamps alongside Tatiana Calderón and André Negrão, and 11th in the Le Castellet 240 partnering Sophia Flörsch.

=== NASCAR ===
NASCAR Euro Series

In 2026, Visser made the jump over to compete in NASCAR, driving the No. 77 Chevrolet Camaro for the Rehberg + Bremotion Racing team in the 2026 NASCAR Euro Series. After the regular season, Visser finished 12th and was first in the fight for the Lady Trophy.

== Racing record ==
=== Career summary ===
Season	Series	Team	Races	Wins	Poles	F/Laps	Podiums	Points	Position
2011	Dutch Supercar Challenge - GT	Race 4 Slovakia	5	1	0	1	2	0	NC†
2012	ADAC Formel Masters	Lotus	17	2	1	0	2	109	8th
2013	ADAC Formel Masters	Lotus	24	1	0	0	2	117	8th
2014	Formula Renault 3.5 Series	AVF	17	0	0	0	0	11	21st
2014	GP3 Series	Hilmer Motorsport	2	0	0	0	0	0	27th
2015	Formula Renault 3.5 Series	AVF	17	0	0	0	0	3	23rd
2015	GP3 Series	Trident	2	0	0	0	0	0	28th
2016	Formula V8 3.5 Series	Teo Martín Motorsport	18	0	0	0	0	50	13th
2017	GT4 European Series Southern Cup - Pro-Am	Schubert Motorsport	2	1	0	0	1	0	NC†
2018	GT4 European Series - Silver	RN Vision STS	12	2	0	0	3	100	6th
2018	French GT4 Cup - Pro Am	3Y Technology	2	0	0	0	0	0	NC†
2018	Kyojo Cup	GWR Sports Marketing	1	0	0	0	1	0	NC†
2018	24 Hours of Nürburgring - SP8T	Securtal Sorg Rennsport	1	0	0	0	0	N/A	6th
2018–19	Formula E	BMW i Andretti Motorsport	Test driver						
2019	W Series	Hitech GP	6	1	0	2	4	100	**2nd**
2019	International GT Open	Senkyr Motorsport	6	0	0	0	1	33	11th
2020	European Le Mans Series - LMP2	Richard Mille Racing Team	4	0	0	0	0	10	19th
2020	24 Hours of Le Mans - LMP2	Richard Mille Racing Team	1	0	0	0	0	N/A	9th
2020	Michelin Pilot Challenge - GS	Fast Track Racing/Classic BMW	1	0	0	0	0	9	68th
2020	24H GT Series - GT4	3Y Technology							
2021	W Series	M. Forbes Motorsport	8	0	0	0	0	38	8th
2021	FIA World Endurance Championship - LMP2	Richard Mille Racing Team	5	0	0	0	0	27	14th
2021	24 Hours of Le Mans - LMP2	Richard Mille Racing Team	1	0	0	0	0	N/A	DNF
2022	W Series	Sirin Racing	7	1	1	0	3	93	**2nd**
2023	Prototype Cup Germany	BHK Motorsport	4	0	0	0	0	10	25th
2023	Ultimate Cup Series - Proto P3	BHK Motorsport	1	0	0	0	0	2	36th
2023	24 Hours of Nürburgring - SP8T	Giti Tire Motorsport By WS Racing	1	0	1	1	1	N/A	**2nd**
2024	Nürburgring Langstrecken-Serie - SP8T	Giti Tire Motorsport By WS Racing							
2024	24 Hours of Nürburgring - SP8T	Giti Tire Motorsport By WS Racing	1	0	0	0	1	N/A	**3rd**
2025	GR Cup Spain	RX ProRacing	4	0	1	0	2	70	11th
2025	Nürburgring Langstrecken-Serie - SP8T	Giti Tire Motorsport By WS Racing	2	0	0	0	1	(16)	NC^{†}
2025	Nürburgring Langstrecken-Serie - AT3	Giti Tire Motorsport By WS Racing	2	2	0	0	2	(8)	NC^{†}
2026*	NASCAR Euro Series - OPEN	Rehberg + Bremotion Racing	8	0	0	0	0	173	12th

^{†} As Visser was a guest driver, she was ineligible to score points. *Series is ongoing

=== Complete Supercar Challenge results ===
Year	Team	Car	Class	1	2	3	4	5	6	7	8	9	10	11	12	13	14	15	16	17	Pos	Pts
2011	Race 4 Slovakia	Praga R4S	GT	HOC; 1	HOC; 2	DON; 1	DON; 2	ASS; 1	ASS; 2	SPA; 1	SPA; 2	ZOL; 1	ZOL; 2	ASS; 1; 1	ASS; 2 Ret	ZOL	SPA; 1 Ret	SPA; 2; 3	ASS; 1 Ret	ASS; 2 DNS	NC†	0†

=== Complete Formula V8 3.5 Series results ===
(key) (Races in bold indicate pole position) (Races in italics indicate fastest lap)

Year	Team	1	2	3	4	5	6	7	8	9	10	11	12	13	14	15	16	17	18	Pos	Points
2014	AVF	MNZ; 1 Ret	MNZ; 2; 17	ALC; 1; 18	ALC; 2; 16	MON; 1; 17	SPA; 1; 10	SPA; 2; 14	MSC; 1; 13	MSC; 2; 13	NÜR; 1; 19	NÜR; 2 Ret	HUN; 1; 17	HUN; 2; 12	LEC; 1; 15	LEC; 2; 11	JER; 1; 5	JER; 2; 12		21st	11
2015	AVF	ALC; 1 DNS	ALC; 2; 19	MON; 1; 13	SPA; 1 DNS	SPA; 2 Ret	HUN; 1; 9	HUN; 2; 15	RBR; 1; 12	RBR; 2; 10	SIL; 1 Ret	SIL; 2; 13	NÜR; 1; 16	NÜR; 2; 15	BUG; 1; 14	BUG; 2; 13	JER; 1; 12	JER; 2 Ret		23rd	3
2016	Teo Martín Motorsport	ALC; 1; 10	ALC; 2; 12	HUN; 1; 7	HUN; 2 DNS	SPA; 1; 7	SPA; 2; 9†	LEC; 1; 9	LEC; 2; 10	SIL; 1; 9	SIL; 2; 10	RBR; 1; 8	RBR; 2; 9	MNZ; 1; 14	MNZ; 2; 9	JER; 1; 7	JER; 2; 5	CAT; 1; 10	CAT; 2; 8	13th	50

^{†} Driver did not finish, but was classified as she completed over 90% of the race distance.

=== Complete GP3 Series results ===
(key) (Races in bold indicate pole position) (Races in italics indicate fastest lap)

Year	Entrant	1	2	3	4	5	6	7	8	9	10	11	12	13	14	15	16	17	18	Pos	Points
2014	Hilmer Motorsport	CAT; FEA; 19	CAT; SPR; 15	RBR; FEA	RBR; SPR	SIL; FEA	SIL; SPR	HOC; FEA	HOC; SPR	HUN; FEA	HUN; SPR	SPA; FEA	SPA; SPR	MNZ; FEA	MNZ; SPR	SOC; FEA	SOC; SPR	YMC; FEA	YMC; SPR	27th	0
2015	Trident	CAT; FEA	CAT; SPR	RBR; FEA	RBR; SPR	SIL; FEA	SIL; SPR	HUN; FEA	HUN; SPR	SPA; FEA; Ret	SPA; SPR; 15	MNZ; FEA	MNZ; SPR	SOC; FEA	SOC; SPR	BHR; FEA	BHR; SPR	YMC; FEA	YMC; SPR	28th	0

=== Complete 24 Hours of Nürburgring results ===
Year	Team	Co-Drivers	Car	Class	Laps	Ovr. Pos.	Class Pos.
2018	(Germany) Sorg Rennsport	(Germany) Dirk Adorf (Netherlands) Tom Coronel (Germany) Nico Menzel	BMW M4 (F82) GT4	SP8T	92	102nd	6th
2023	(Germany) WS Racing	(United Kingdom) Pippa Mann (France) Célia Martin (Liechtenstein) Fabienne Wohlwend	BMW M4 GT4 (G82)	SP8T	135	81st	**2nd**
2024	(Germany) WS Racing	(United Kingdom) Pippa Mann (Germany) Carrie Schreiner (Liechtenstein) Fabienne Wohlwend	BMW M4 (G82) GT4	SP8T	44	47th	**3rd**

=== Complete W Series results ===
(key) (Races in bold indicate pole position) (Races in italics indicate fastest lap)

Year	Team	1	2	3	4	5	6	7	8	DC	Points
2019	Hitech GP	HOC; 4	ZOL; 1	MIS; 2	NOR; 2	ASS; 4	BRH; 3			2nd	100
2021	M. Forbes Motorsport	RBR; 12	RBR; 11	SIL; 6	HUN; 5	SPA; DNS	ZAN; 12	COA; 5	COA; 5	8th	38
2022	Sirin Racing	MIA1; 3	MIA2; 7	CAT; 5	SIL; 5	**LEC**; 4	HUN; 3	SIN; 1		2nd	93

=== Complete European Le Mans Series results ===
(key) (Races in bold indicate pole position; results in italics indicate fastest lap)

Year	Entrant	Class	Chassis	Engine	1	2	3	4	5	Rank	Points
2020	Richard Mille Racing Team	LMP2	Oreca 07	Gibson GK428 4.2 L V8	LEC	SPA; 6	LEC; 11	MNZ; 10	ALG; 11	19th	10

=== Complete 24 Hours of Le Mans results ===
Year	Team	Co-Drivers	Car	Class	Laps	Pos.	Class Pos.
2020	(France) Richard Mille Racing Team	(Germany) Sophia Flörsch (Colombia) Tatiana Calderón	Oreca 07-Gibson	LMP2	364	13th	9th
2021	(France) Richard Mille Racing Team	(Germany) Sophia Flörsch (Colombia) Tatiana Calderón	Oreca 07-Gibson	LMP2	74	DNF	DNF

=== Complete FIA World Endurance Championship results ===
(key) (Races in bold indicate pole position) (Races in italics indicate fastest lap)

Year	Entrant	Class	Chassis	Engine	1	2	3	4	5	6	Rank	Points
2021	Richard Mille Racing Team	LMP2	Oreca 07	Gibson GK428 4.2 L V8	SPA; 8	ALG; 6	MNZ	LMS; Ret	BHR; 6	BHR; 9	14th	27
