= 2014 German Formula Three Championship =

The 2014 ATS Formel 3 Cup was the 12th and final edition of the ATS F3 Cup. The final season began on 26 April at Oschersleben and finished on 5 October at Hockenheim after eight race weekends with three races scheduled for each weekend. However, one race was cancelled due to fog, and thus the championship was held over a total of 23 races.

Category veteran Markus Pommer finished the season as the champion, after comfortably winning the most races during the season. Pommer won 14 races for the Motopark Academy-run Lotus team – for a total of 17 podiums – as well as taking 11 pole positions and 10 fastest laps. He finished almost 150 points clear of his nearest rival Nabil Jeffri, who was run by Motopark Academy without Lotus backing. Jeffri won a pair of races at Oschersleben and the first Hockenheim meeting, with his season revolving around consistency, with no fewer than 10 runner-up finishes and 15 podium finishes in total. Jeffri finished 11 points clear of another Lotus driver, Indy Dontje, who was a race winner at the Red Bull Ring, and was the highest finishing rookie in the championship. Dontje was also the winner of the concurrent rookie championship by 45 points.

Three other drivers won races during the season; Van Amersfoort Racing duo Sam MacLeod (three wins) and Weiron Tan (two wins) were joined in victory by Nicolai Sylvest, who won at the Nürburgring for JBR Motorsport & Engineering. With 15 total wins, Lotus were the winners of the teams' championship, 113 points clear of the next best team, Van Amersfoort Racing.

== Teams and drivers ==
Team	Chassis	Engine	No.	Driver	Status	Rounds
(Germany) Motopark	Dallara F311/002	Volkswagen	1	(Malaysia) Nabil Jeffri		All
(Germany) Lotus	Dallara F309/003	Volkswagen	2	(Colombia) Andrés Méndez	R	All
(Germany) Lotus	Dallara F308/098	Volkswagen	3	(Netherlands) Indy Dontje	R	All
(Germany) Lotus	Dallara F311/005	Volkswagen	27	(Germany) Markus Pommer		All
(Netherlands) Van Amersfoort Racing	Dallara F308/007	Volkswagen	5	(Malaysia) Weiron Tan	R	All
(Netherlands) Van Amersfoort Racing	Dallara F311/003	Volkswagen	6	(United Kingdom) Sam MacLeod	R	All
(Italy) ADM Motorsport	Dallara F308/014	Volkswagen	10	(China) Kang Ling		5–6
(Italy) ADM Motorsport	Dallara F308/014	Volkswagen	11	(United Kingdom) Dino Zamparelli		4
(Italy) ADM Motorsport	Dallara F308/014	Volkswagen	13	(Brazil) Luís Felipe Derani		7
(Italy) ADM Motorsport	Dallara F308/014	Volkswagen	20	(Russia) Konstantin Tereshchenko	R	8
(Italy) SMP Racing by ADM Motorsport	Dallara F308/029	Volkswagen	12	(Russia) Sergey Trofimov	R	1
(Italy) SMP Racing by ADM Motorsport	Dallara F308/029	Volkswagen	72	(Russia) Nikita Zlobin		All
(Switzerland) Jo Zeller Racing	Dallara F305/011	Mercedes	14	(Switzerland) Thomas Amweg		4–5
(Italy) EuroInternational	Dallara F311/001	Mercedes	15	(United States) Santino Ferrucci	R	3–4
(Italy) EuroInternational	Dallara F311/001	Mercedes	17	(Denmark) Nicolas Beer	R	8
(Germany) JBR Motorsport & Engineering	Dallara F309/023	Volkswagen	23	(Denmark) Nicolai Sylvest	R	All
(Germany) Amkon Motorsport	Dallara F308/096	OPC-Challenge	25	(Germany) Maximilian Hackl		All
(Austria) Franz Wöss Racing	Dallara F305/040	OPC-Challenge	38	(Italy) Luca Iannacone		3, 5–8
(Austria) Franz Wöss Racing	Dallara F308/052	OPC-Challenge	39	(Switzerland) Nikolaj Rogivue	R	8

Icon	Status
R	Rookie

== Race calendar and results ==
The championship was a part of the ADAC Masters weekend at six of the season's eight rounds; additional rounds were held at the Stuttgarter Rössle meeting at Hockenheim in June and a round in support of the Deutsche Tourenwagen Masters at Lausitzring in September. All races were held in Germany, excepting Red Bull Ring round at Austria.

Round		Circuit	Date	Pole position	Fastest lap	Winning driver	Winning team	Rookie winner
1	R1	Motorsport Arena Oschersleben	26 April	(Germany) Markus Pommer	(Malaysia) Nabil Jeffri	(Germany) Markus Pommer	(Germany) Lotus	(Netherlands) Indy Dontje
1	R2	Motorsport Arena Oschersleben	26 April		(Malaysia) Nabil Jeffri	(Malaysia) Nabil Jeffri	(Germany) Motopark	(Netherlands) Indy Dontje
1	R3	Motorsport Arena Oschersleben	27 April	(Malaysia) Nabil Jeffri	(Malaysia) Nabil Jeffri	(Germany) Markus Pommer	(Germany) Lotus	(Netherlands) Indy Dontje
2	R1	Lausitzring	24 May	(Germany) Markus Pommer	(United Kingdom) Sam MacLeod	(United Kingdom) Sam MacLeod	(Netherlands) Van Amersfoort Racing	(United Kingdom) Sam MacLeod
2	R2	Lausitzring	24 May		(Germany) Markus Pommer	(Germany) Markus Pommer	(Germany) Lotus	(Netherlands) Indy Dontje
2	R3	Lausitzring	25 May	(Germany) Markus Pommer	(United Kingdom) Sam MacLeod	(Germany) Markus Pommer	(Germany) Lotus	(United Kingdom) Sam MacLeod
3	R1	Red Bull Ring	7 June	(Germany) Markus Pommer	(United Kingdom) Sam MacLeod	(Germany) Markus Pommer	(Germany) Lotus	(Netherlands) Indy Dontje
3	R2	Red Bull Ring	7 June		(Germany) Markus Pommer	(Netherlands) Indy Dontje	(Germany) Lotus	(Netherlands) Indy Dontje
3	R3	Red Bull Ring	8 June	(Germany) Markus Pommer	(Germany) Markus Pommer	(Germany) Markus Pommer	(Germany) Lotus	(Netherlands) Indy Dontje
4	R1	Hockenheimring	14 June	(Malaysia) Nabil Jeffri	(Germany) Markus Pommer	(Malaysia) Nabil Jeffri	(Germany) Motopark	(Netherlands) Indy Dontje
4	R2	Hockenheimring	14 June		(Netherlands) Indy Dontje	(United Kingdom) Sam MacLeod	(Netherlands) Van Amersfoort Racing	(United Kingdom) Sam MacLeod
4	R3	Hockenheimring	15 June	(Germany) Markus Pommer	(Netherlands) Indy Dontje	(Germany) Markus Pommer	(Germany) Lotus	(Denmark) Nicolai Sylvest
5	R1	Nürburgring	30 August	(Germany) Markus Pommer	(Germany) Markus Pommer	(Germany) Markus Pommer	(Germany) Lotus	(Denmark) Nicolai Sylvest
5	R2	Nürburgring	31 August		(Germany) Markus Pommer	(Denmark) Nicolai Sylvest	(Germany) JBR Motorsport & Engineering	(Denmark) Nicolai Sylvest
5	R3	Nürburgring	31 August	(Germany) Markus Pommer	(China) Kang Ling	(Germany) Markus Pommer	(Germany) Lotus	(United Kingdom) Sam MacLeod
6	R1	Lausitzring	14 September	(Germany) Markus Pommer	(Germany) Markus Pommer	(Germany) Markus Pommer	(Germany) Lotus	(Netherlands) Indy Dontje
6	R2	Lausitzring	14 September	Race cancelled due to fog				
6	R3	Lausitzring	14 September	(Germany) Markus Pommer	(Germany) Markus Pommer	(Germany) Markus Pommer	(Germany) Lotus	(United Kingdom) Sam MacLeod
7	R1	Sachsenring	20 September	(Germany) Markus Pommer	(United Kingdom) Sam MacLeod	(Germany) Markus Pommer	(Germany) Lotus	(Malaysia) Weiron Tan
7	R2	Sachsenring	20 September		(Netherlands) Indy Dontje	(United Kingdom) Sam MacLeod	(Netherlands) Van Amersfoort Racing	(United Kingdom) Sam MacLeod
7	R3	Sachsenring	21 September	(United Kingdom) Sam MacLeod	(United Kingdom) Sam MacLeod	(Germany) Markus Pommer	(Germany) Lotus	(United Kingdom) Sam MacLeod
8	R1	Hockenheimring	4 October	(Netherlands) Indy Dontje	(Germany) Markus Pommer	(Malaysia) Weiron Tan	(Netherlands) Van Amersfoort Racing	(Malaysia) Weiron Tan
8	R2	Hockenheimring	5 October		(Germany) Markus Pommer	(Germany) Markus Pommer	(Germany) Lotus	(Netherlands) Indy Dontje
8	R3	Hockenheimring	5 October	(Malaysia) Nabil Jeffri	(United Kingdom) Sam MacLeod	(Malaysia) Weiron Tan	(Netherlands) Van Amersfoort Racing	(Malaysia) Weiron Tan

== Championship standings ==
=== Cup ===
- Points were awarded as follows:

	1	2	3	4	5	6	7	8	9	10	PP	FL
Race 1	25	18	15	12	10	8	6	4	2	1	**3**	2
Race 2	10	8	6	5	4	3	2	1	0	0	**0**	2
Race 3	25	18	15	12	10	8	6	4	2	1	**0**	2

Pos	Driver	OSC			LAU1			RBR			HOC1			NÜR			LAU2			SAC			HOC2			Pts
1	(Germany) Markus Pommer	**1**	4	1	**4**	1	**1**	**1**	3	**1**	2	Ret	**1**	**1**	7	**1**	**1**	C	**1**	**1**	3	1	4	1	12†	424
2	(Malaysia) Nabil Jeffri	6	1	**2**	Ret	8	2	2	2	2	**1**	Ret	2	2	2	3	2	C	2	2	5	8	3	3	**Ret**	277
3	(Netherlands) Indy Dontje	2	2	3	2	2	4	3	1	3	3	3	9	12†	4	4	3	C	6	4	7	4	**2**	2	2	266
4	(United Kingdom) Sam MacLeod	3	3	4	1	3	3	6	10	7	7	1	4	9	3	2	6	C	3	6	1	**2**	Ret	7	3	243
5	(Malaysia) Weiron Tan	9	6	5	6	6	7	10	4	4	4	4	8	4	8	6	Ret	C	Ret	3	2	3	1	Ret	1	182
6	(Denmark) Nicolai Sylvest	4	10	6	3	4	6	11	5	5	8	9	3	3	1	5	5	C	5	5	4	6	DSQ	4	4	182
7	(Colombia) Andrés Méndez	7	7	7	5	9	8	5	8	6	Ret	5	5	7	10	8	8	C	8	9	9	10	5	8	5	117
8	(Russia) Nikita Zlobin	Ret	5	8	Ret	5	5	7	9	9	9	6	6	8	5	7	4	C	4	8	10	7	Ret	DNS	8	109
9	(Germany) Maximilian Hackl	8	9	9	Ret	7	9	8	7	8	10	7	7	10	9	9	9	C	9	10	8	9	7	9	9	69
10	(United States) Santino Ferrucci							4	6	DNS	5	2	Ret													33
11	(Russia) Sergey Trofimov	5	8	10																						12
Guest drivers ineligible for points
	(Brazil) Luís Felipe Derani																			7	6	5				
	(Denmark) Nicolas Beer																						Ret	5	6	
	(Switzerland) Thomas Amweg										Ret	DNS	10†	5	11	10										
	(China) Kang Ling													6	6	11	7	C	7							
	(Russia) Konstantin Tereshchenko																						6	6	7	
	(United Kingdom) Dino Zamparelli										6	8	Ret													
	(Switzerland) Nikolaj Rogivue																						8	11†	10	
	(Italy) Luca Iannaccone							9	11	10				11	12	12	10	C	10	11	Ret	11	9	10	11	
Pos	Driver	OSC			LAU1			RBR			HOC1			NÜR			LAU2			SAC			HOC2			Pts

Colour	Result
Gold	Winner
Silver	Second place
Bronze	Third place
Green	Points classification
Blue	Non-points classification
Blue	Non-classified finish (NC)
Purple	Retired, not classified (Ret)
Red	Did not qualify (DNQ)
Red	Did not pre-qualify (DNPQ)
Black	Disqualified (DSQ)
White	Did not start (DNS)
White	Withdrew (WD)
White	Race cancelled (C)
Blank	Did not practice (DNP)
Blank	Did not arrive (DNA)
Blank	Excluded (EX)

**Bold** – Pole
Italics – Fastest Lap

- † — Drivers did not finish the race, but were classified as they completed over 90% of the race distance.

=== Rookie ===
Pos	Driver	OSC			LAU1			RBR			HOC1			NÜR			LAU2			SAC			HOC2			Pts
1	(Netherlands) Indy Dontje	2	2	3	2	2	4	3	1	3	3	3	9	12†	4	4	3	C	6	4	7	4	2	2	2	365
2	(United Kingdom) Sam MacLeod	3	3	4	1	3	3	6	10	7	7	1	4	9	3	2	6	C	3	6	1	2	Ret	7	3	320
3	(Denmark) Nicolai Sylvest	4	10	6	3	4	6	11	5	5	8	9	3	3	1	5	5	C	5	5	4	6	DSQ	4	4	272
4	(Malaysia) Weiron Tan	9	6	5	6	6	7	10	4	4	4	4	8	4	8	6	Ret	C	Ret	3	2	3	1	Ret	1	263
5	(Colombia) Andrés Méndez	7	7	7	5	9	8	5	8	6	Ret	5	5	7	10	8	8	C	8	9	9	10	5	8	5	208
6	(United States) Santino Ferrucci							4	6	DNS	5	2	Ret													46
7	(Russia) Sergey Trofimov	5	8	10																						24
Guest drivers ineligible for points
	(Denmark) Nicolas Beer																						Ret	5	6	
	(China) Kang Ling													6	6	11	7	C	7							
	(Russia) Konstantin Tereshchenko																						6	6	7	
	(Switzerland) Nikolaj Rogivue																						8	11†	10	
Pos	Driver	OSC			LAU1			RBR			HOC1			NÜR			LAU2			SAC			HOC2			Pts

- † — Drivers did not finish the race, but were classified as they completed over 90% of the race distance.

=== Team ===
Pos	Team	OSC			LAU1			RBR			HOC1			NÜR			LAU2			SAC			HOC2			Pts
1	(Germany) Lotus	1	2	1	2	1	1	1	1	1	2	3	1	1	4	1	1	C	1	1	3	1	2	1	2	429
2	(Netherlands) Van Amersfoort Racing	3	3	4	1	3	3	6	4	4	4	1	4	4	3	2	6	C	3	3	1	2	1	7	1	316
3	(Germany) Motopark	6	1	2	Ret	8	2	2	2	2	1	Ret	2	2	2	3	2	C	2	2	5	8	3	3	Ret	279
4	(Germany) JBR Motorsport & Engineering	4	10	6	3	4	6	11	5	5	8	9	3	3	1	5	5	C	5	5	4	6	DSQ	4	4	225
5	(Italy) SMP Racing by ADM Motorsport	5	5	8	Ret	5	5	7	9	9	9	6	6	8	5	7	4	C	4	8	10	7	Ret	DNS	8	175
6	(Germany) Amkon Motorsport	8	9	9	Ret	7	9	8	7	8	10	7	7	10	9	9	9	C	9	10	8	9	7	9	9	152
7	(Italy) EuroInternational							4	6	DNS	5	2	Ret										Ret	5	6	39
Guest teams ineligible for points
	(Italy) ADM Motorsport										6	8	Ret	6	6	11	7	C	7	7	6	5	6	6	7	
	(Switzerland) Jo Zeller Racing										Ret	DNS	10†	5	11	10										
	(Austria) Franz Wöss Racing							9	11	10				11	12	12	10	C	10	11	Ret	11	8	10	10	
Pos	Team	OSC			LAU1			RBR			HOC1			NÜR			LAU2			SAC			HOC2			Pts

- † — Drivers did not finish the race, but were classified as they completed over 90% of the race distance.
