= 2013 ADAC Formel Masters =

Motorsport season

The 2013 ADAC Formel Masters was the sixth season of the ADAC Formel Masters series, an open-wheel motor racing series for emerging young racing drivers based in Germany. The season began on 27 April at Motorsport Arena Oschersleben and finished on 29 September at Hockenheim after eight race weekends, totalling 24 races.

ADAC Berlin-Brandenburg e.V. driver Alessio Picariello dominated the battle for the drivers' championship from start to finish taking twelve wins from the 24 races on his way to the championship title. Other race wins were shared between his teammates Maximilian Günther and Hendrik Grapp, Schiller Motorsport drivers Jason Kremer and Fabian Schiller, Neuhauser Racing drivers Nicolas Beer and Marvin Dienst, Lotus drivers Indy Dontje and Beitske Visser, as well as Team KUG Motorsport driver Ralph Boschung, who inherited his first win after Picariello was penalised at the Automotodróm Slovakia Ring.

== Teams and drivers ==
Team	No.	Drivers	Rounds
(Germany) Lotus	2	(South Africa) Callan O'Keeffe	All
(Germany) Lotus	3	(Denmark) Mikkel Jensen	All
(Germany) Lotus	4	(Netherlands) Beitske Visser	All
(Germany) Lotus	5	(Netherlands) Indy Dontje	All
(Austria) Neuhauser Racing	6	(Germany) Marvin Dienst	All
(Austria) Neuhauser Racing	7	(Denmark) Nicolas Beer	All
(Austria) Neuhauser Racing	8	(Austria) Stefan Riener	All
(Germany) ADAC Berlin-Brandenburg e.V.	9	(Germany) Maximilian Günther	All
(Germany) ADAC Berlin-Brandenburg e.V.	10	(Germany) Kim-Luis Schramm	All
(Germany) ADAC Berlin-Brandenburg e.V.	11	(Germany) Hendrik Grapp	All
(Germany) ADAC Berlin-Brandenburg e.V.	14	(Switzerland) Giorgio Maggi	All
(Germany) ADAC Berlin-Brandenburg e.V.	15	(Belgium) Alessio Picariello	All
(Germany) Schiller Motorsport	16	(Germany) Jason Kremer	All
(Germany) Schiller Motorsport	17	(Germany) Fabian Schiller	All
(Germany) KSW Motorsport	19	(Germany) Kim-Alexander Giersiepen	1–3
(Germany) KSW Motorsport	20	(Germany) Martin Gatz	1–3, 6–8
(Germany) JBR Motorsport & Engineering	19	(Germany) Kim-Alexander Giersiepen	4–8
(Germany) JBR Motorsport & Engineering	22	(Germany) Benedikt Gentgen	All
(Germany) JBR Motorsport & Engineering	23	(Germany) Hannes Utsch	All
(Germany) JBR Motorsport & Engineering	29	(Germany) Marcel Lenerz	6, 8
(Germany) Team KUG Motorsport	24	(Netherlands) Stéphane Kox	All
(Germany) Team KUG Motorsport	26	(Switzerland) Ralph Boschung	All
(Germany) Team KUG Motorsport	27	(Germany) Florian Herzog	1–3
(Austria) HS Engineering	28	(Kuwait) Zaid Ashkanani	5

== Race calendar and results ==
- The 2013 calendar was announced on 8 November 2012.

Round		Circuit	Date	Pole position	Fastest lap	Winning driver	Winning team
1	R1	(Germany) Motorsport Arena Oschersleben	27 April	(Belgium) Alessio Picariello	(Germany) Florian Herzog	(Belgium) Alessio Picariello	(Germany) ADAC Berlin-Brandenburg e.V.
1	R2	(Germany) Motorsport Arena Oschersleben	28 April	(Belgium) Alessio Picariello	(Denmark) Nicolas Beer	(Belgium) Alessio Picariello	(Germany) ADAC Berlin-Brandenburg e.V.
1	R3	(Germany) Motorsport Arena Oschersleben	28 April		(Germany) Marvin Dienst	(Netherlands) Indy Dontje	(Germany) Lotus
2	R1	(Belgium) Circuit de Spa-Francorchamps	11 May	(Germany) Jason Kremer	(Belgium) Alessio Picariello	(Belgium) Alessio Picariello	(Germany) ADAC Berlin-Brandenburg e.V.
2	R2	(Belgium) Circuit de Spa-Francorchamps	12 May	(Germany) Jason Kremer	(Belgium) Alessio Picariello	(Belgium) Alessio Picariello	(Germany) ADAC Berlin-Brandenburg e.V.
2	R3	(Belgium) Circuit de Spa-Francorchamps	12 May		(Germany) Jason Kremer	(Germany) Jason Kremer	(Germany) Schiller Motorsport
3	R1	(Germany) Sachsenring	8 June	(Belgium) Alessio Picariello	(Germany) Hendrik Grapp	(Germany) Hendrik Grapp	(Germany) ADAC Berlin-Brandenburg e.V.
3	R2	(Germany) Sachsenring	9 June	(Belgium) Alessio Picariello	(Belgium) Alessio Picariello	(Belgium) Alessio Picariello	(Germany) ADAC Berlin-Brandenburg e.V.
3	R3	(Germany) Sachsenring	9 June		(South Africa) Callan O'Keeffe	(Netherlands) Beitske Visser	(Germany) Lotus
4	R1	(Germany) Nürburgring	3 August	(Germany) Maximilian Günther	(Belgium) Alessio Picariello	(Belgium) Alessio Picariello	(Germany) ADAC Berlin-Brandenburg e.V.
4	R2	(Germany) Nürburgring	4 August	(Germany) Maximilian Günther	(Belgium) Alessio Picariello	(Belgium) Alessio Picariello	(Germany) ADAC Berlin-Brandenburg e.V.
4	R3	(Germany) Nürburgring	4 August		(Denmark) Nicolas Beer	(Denmark) Nicolas Beer	(Austria) Neuhauser Racing
5	R1	(Austria) Red Bull Ring	10 August	(Germany) Maximilian Günther	(Germany) Maximilian Günther	(Belgium) Alessio Picariello	(Germany) ADAC Berlin-Brandenburg e.V.
5	R2	(Austria) Red Bull Ring	11 August	(Germany) Maximilian Günther	(Germany) Jason Kremer	(Belgium) Alessio Picariello	(Germany) ADAC Berlin-Brandenburg e.V.
5	R3	(Austria) Red Bull Ring	11 August		(Germany) Jason Kremer	(Netherlands) Indy Dontje	(Germany) Lotus
6	R1	(Germany) Lausitzring	31 August	(Germany) Maximilian Günther	(Germany) Maximilian Günther	(Germany) Maximilian Günther	(Germany) ADAC Berlin-Brandenburg e.V.
6	R2	(Germany) Lausitzring	1 September	(Germany) Maximilian Günther	(Belgium) Alessio Picariello	(Germany) Maximilian Günther	(Germany) ADAC Berlin-Brandenburg e.V.
6	R3	(Germany) Lausitzring	1 September		(Germany) Jason Kremer	(Germany) Fabian Schiller	(Germany) Schiller Motorsport
7	R1	Automotodróm Slovakia Ring	14 September	(Belgium) Alessio Picariello	(Germany) Marvin Dienst	(Belgium) Alessio Picariello	(Germany) ADAC Berlin-Brandenburg e.V.
7	R2	Automotodróm Slovakia Ring	15 September	(Denmark) Nicolas Beer	(Germany) Marvin Dienst	(Germany) Marvin Dienst	(Austria) Neuhauser Racing
7	R3	Automotodróm Slovakia Ring	15 September		(Switzerland) Ralph Boschung	(Switzerland) Ralph Boschung	(Germany) Team KUG Motorsport
8	R1	(Germany) Hockenheimring	28 September	(Germany) Maximilian Günther	(Denmark) Nicolas Beer	(Belgium) Alessio Picariello	(Germany) ADAC Berlin-Brandenburg e.V.
8	R2	(Germany) Hockenheimring	29 September	(Germany) Maximilian Günther	(Denmark) Nicolas Beer	(Belgium) Alessio Picariello	(Germany) ADAC Berlin-Brandenburg e.V.
8	R3	(Germany) Hockenheimring	29 September		(Denmark) Nicolas Beer	(Denmark) Nicolas Beer	(Austria) Neuhauser Racing

== Championship standings ==
=== Drivers' Championship ===
- Points are awarded as follows:

	1	2	3	4	5	6	7	8	9	10
Races 1 & 2	25	18	15	12	10	8	6	4	2	1
Race 3	15	10	8	7	6	5	4	3	2	1

Pos	Driver	OSC (Germany)			SPA (Belgium)			SAC (Germany)			NÜR (Germany)			RBR (Austria)			LAU (Germany)			SVK (Slovakia)			HOC (Germany)			Pts
1	(Belgium) Alessio Picariello	**1**	**1**	4	1	1	Ret	**6**	**1**	7	1	1	3	1	1	Ret	2	2	13	**1**	2	16	1	1	4	388
2	(Germany) Maximilian Günther	5	3	5	3	3	6	2	16	13	**3**	**2**	4	**4**	**2**	3	**1**	**1**	7	Ret	Ret	7	**2**	**Ret**	9	240
3	(Germany) Jason Kremer	12	2	6	**2**	**4**	1	4	6	3	5	19	11	2	3	9	3	Ret	4	4	3	4	6	4	2	227
4	(Denmark) Nicolas Beer	3	4	2	4	2	4	5	15	9	2	8	1	3	10	4	4	4	DSQ	18	**6**	9	4	2	1	217
5	(Germany) Marvin Dienst	7	5	3	11	5	Ret	9	2	5	7	5	2	7	12	6	15	3	5	2	1	2	Ret	3	Ret	171
6	(Netherlands) Indy Dontje	4	7	1	8	10	5	3	4	6	8	9	6	6	5	1	10	9	10	9	8	6	10	7	3	137
7	(Switzerland) Ralph Boschung	10	11	8	6	13	3	Ret	Ret	14	4	3	7	Ret	Ret	8	6	5	3	3	4	1	3	Ret	5	122
8	(Netherlands) Beitske Visser	8	9	9	Ret	16	8	14	7	1	9	4	9	Ret	6	18	5	Ret	8	5	5	3	7	5	7	117
9	(Germany) Hendrik Grapp	2	6	19	5	6	7	1	5	2	6	17	Ret	14	15	16	9	12	9	16	Ret	10	14	DNS	DNS	106
10	(Denmark) Mikkel Jensen	11	13	Ret	9	7	2	11	3	8	11	7	5	Ret	4	Ret	Ret	6	6	8	10	18	9	6	6	94
11	(Germany) Fabian Schiller	19	10	10	7	9	Ret	8	10	12	19	18	8	Ret	8	5	7	7	1	Ret	7	5	5	Ret	8	82
12	(Austria) Stefan Riener	9	15	17	10	12	DSQ	Ret	Ret	11	10	6	13	5	9	7	8	8	2	6	16	17	8	9	DSQ	60
13	(South Africa) Callan O'Keeffe	6	8	7	12	8	10	16	Ret	15	12	10	10	9	Ret	10	12	10	17	7	11	Ret	12	15	10	34
14	(Germany) Kim-Luis Schramm	DNS	12	11	13	DNS	11	13	9	10	13	11	Ret	8	7	2	14	11	11	10	Ret	11	13	Ret	12	24
15	(Germany) Florian Herzog	13	DNS	DNS	19	11	13	7	8	4																17
16	(Netherlands) Stéphane Kox	17	14	12	Ret	19	9	12	14	17	16	12	12	13	11	13	16	14	12	11	9	8	16	10	11	10
17	(Germany) Benedikt Gentgen	16	16	14	14	14	14	15	11	DNS	14	13	Ret	10	13	11	11	13	19	15	12	12	11	8	Ret	5
18	(Germany) Kim-Alexander Giersiepen	20	Ret	16	17	17	12	10	Ret	18	18	15	15	11	14	12	13	15	18	14	15	13	15	Ret	13	1
19	(Germany) Hannes Utsch	14	Ret	15	18	15	16	DNS	DNS	DNS	17	14	14	15	18	17	Ret	18	Ret	12	Ret	DNS	17	11	17	0
20	(Switzerland) Giorgio Maggi	15	DNS	13	16	18	15	17	12	16	15	16	16	16	17	15	18	17	14	13	14	15	19	12	15	0
21	(Kuwait) Zaid Ashkanani													12	16	14										0
22	(Germany) Martin Gatz	18	17	18	15	DNS	17	18	13	DNS							Ret	16	15	17	13	14	Ret	14	14	0
23	(Germany) Marcel Lenerz																17	19	16				18	13	16	0
Pos	Driver	OSC (Germany)			SPA (Belgium)			SAC (Germany)			NÜR (Germany)			RBR (Austria)			LAU (Germany)			SVK (Slovakia)			HOC (Germany)			Pts

Colour	Result
Gold	Winner
Silver	Second place
Bronze	Third place
Green	Points classification
Blue	Non-points classification
Blue	Non-classified finish (NC)
Purple	Retired, not classified (Ret)
Red	Did not qualify (DNQ)
Red	Did not pre-qualify (DNPQ)
Black	Disqualified (DSQ)
White	Did not start (DNS)
White	Withdrew (WD)
White	Race cancelled (C)
Blank	Did not practice (DNP)
Blank	Did not arrive (DNA)
Blank	Excluded (EX)

**Bold** – Pole
Italics – Fastest Lap

=== Teams' championship ===
Pos	Team	Points
1	(Germany) ADAC Berlin-Brandenburg e.V.	633
2	(Austria) Neuhauser Racing Team	453
3	(Germany) Schiller Motorsport	373
4	(Germany) Lotus	320
5	(Germany) Team KUG Motorsport	246
6	(Germany) JBR Motorsport & Engineering	62
7	(Germany) KSW Motorsport	15
8	(Austria) HS Engineering	2
