= Haaksbergen =

- Municipality
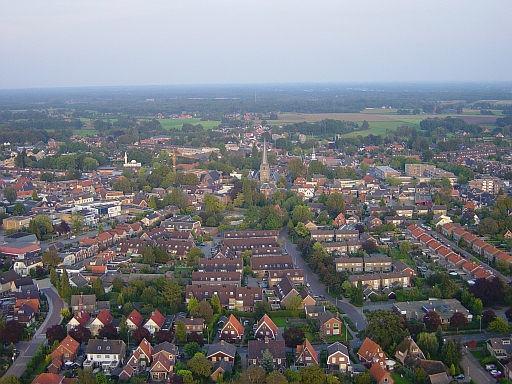
- Aerial view of Haaksbergen

- Flag Coat of arms

- Location in Overijssel
- Coordinates: 52°9′N 6°45′E
- Country: Netherlands
- Province: Overijssel

Government
  - Body: Municipal council
  - Mayor: Gerard van den Hengel (VVD)

Area
  - Total: 105.50 km^{2} (40.73 sq mi)
  - Land: 104.82 km^{2} (40.47 sq mi)
  - Water: 0.68 km^{2} (0.26 sq mi)
- Elevation: 27 m (89 ft)

Population (January 2021)
  - Total: 24,229
  - Density: 231/km^{2} (600/sq mi)
- Demonym(s): Haaksbergenaar, Haaksberger
- Time zone: UTC+1 (CET)
  - Summer (DST): UTC+2 (CEST)
- Postcode: 7480–7489
- Area code: 053
- Website: www.haaksbergen.nl

Haaksbergen (Dutch pronunciation: [ˈɦaːksbɛrɣə(n)]) is a municipality and a town in the eastern Netherlands, in the province of Overijssel, in the Twente region.

The Buurserbeek flows through the municipality of Haaksbergen.

== Population centres ==
- Boekelo
- Brammelo
- Buurse
- Den Braam
- Eppenzolder
- Haaksbergen
- Harmöle
- Holthuizen
- Honesch
- Langelo
- St. Isidorushoeve
- Stepelo

=== Topography ===
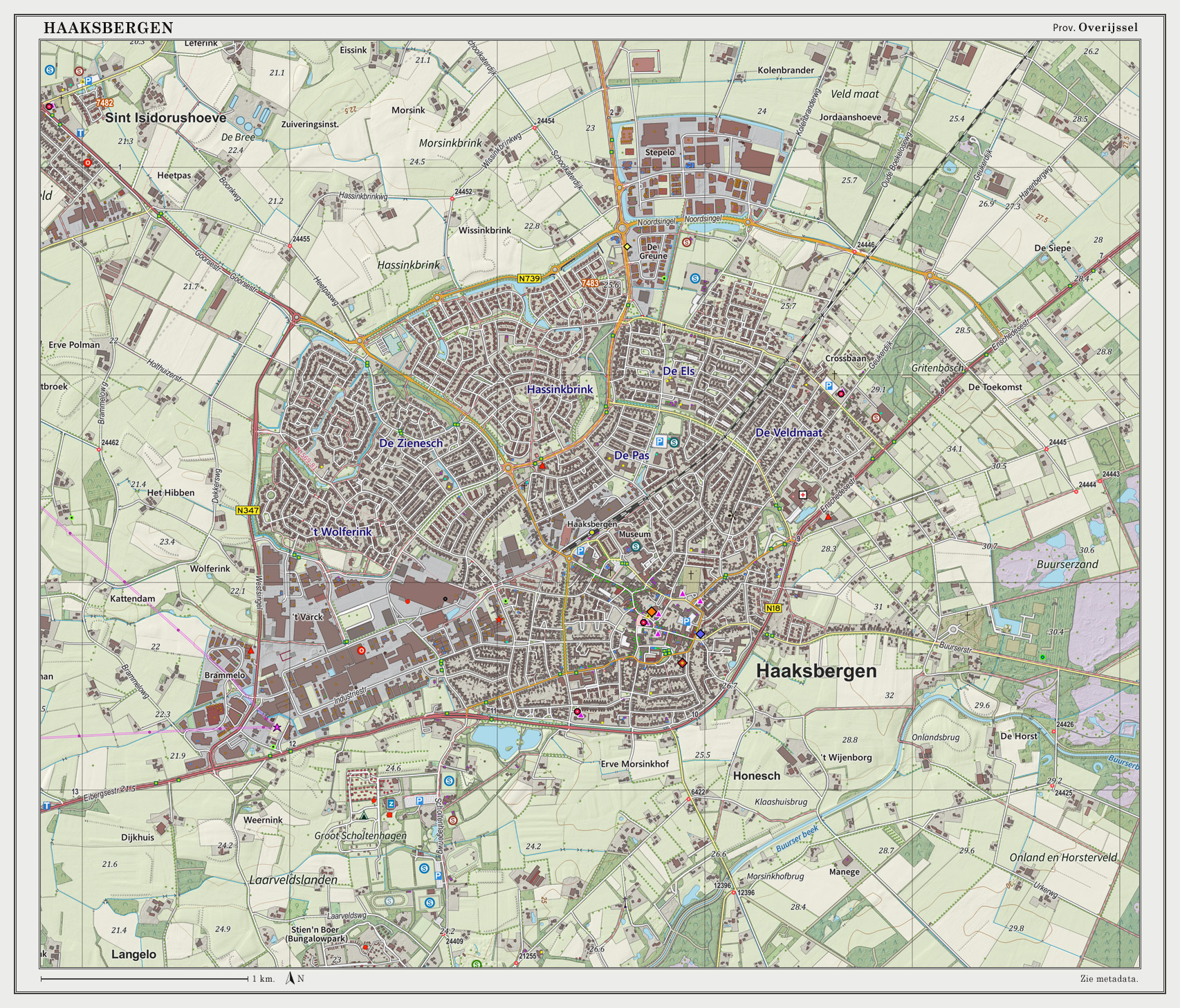

Dutch Topographic map of Haaksbergen (town), June 2014.

== Haaksbergen monstertruck accident ==
On 28 September 2014 a monster truck crashed into the attending crowd. Three visitors were reported dead, amongst them one child. According to Hans Gerritsen, mayor of Haaksbergen at the time, twelve people were injured.

== Notable residents ==
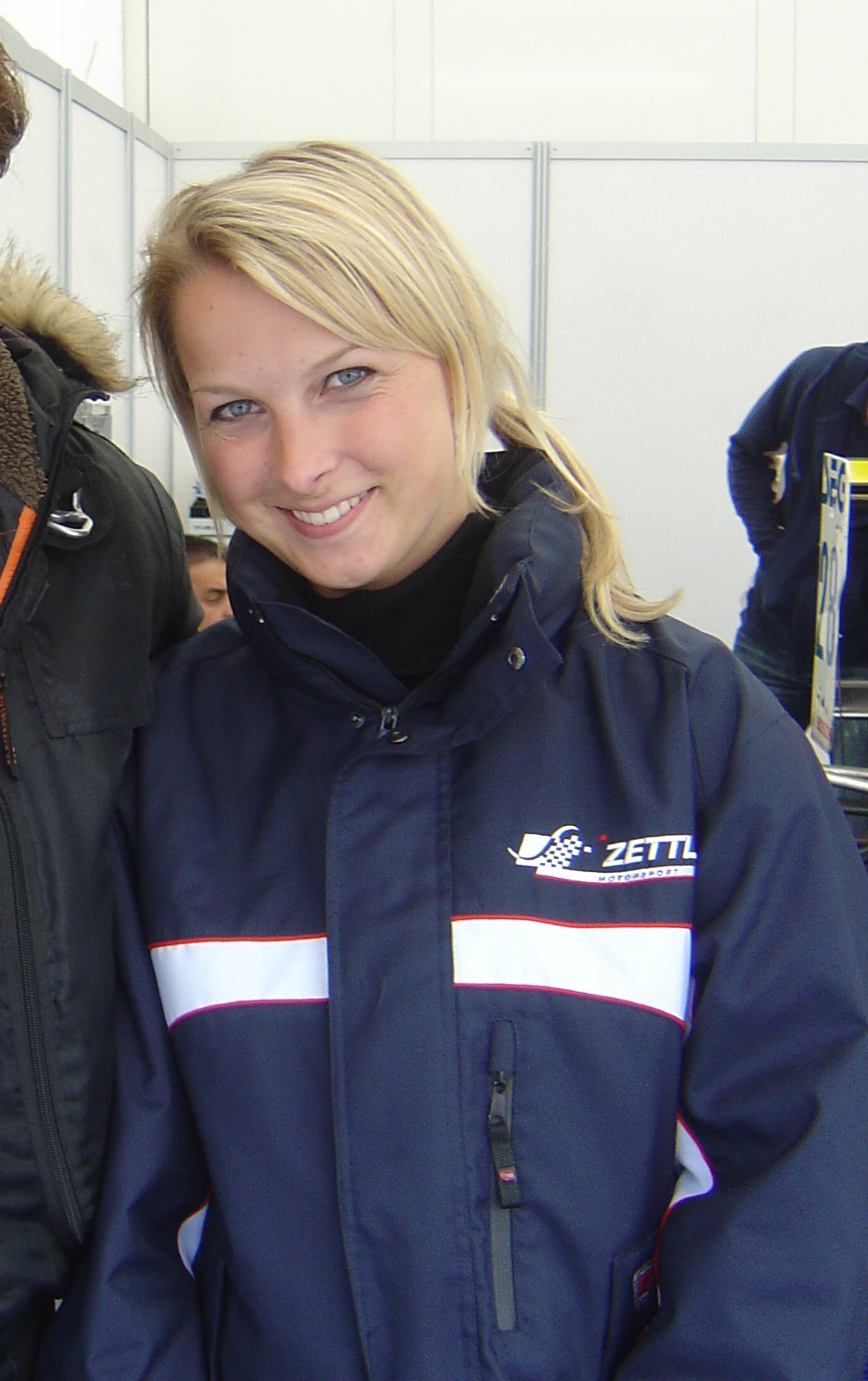
Shirley van der Lof, 2009

- Paul Ulenbelt (1952–2025), Dutch politician, trade unionist and academic
- Angelien Eijsink (born 1960), Dutch politician
- Han ten Broeke (born 1969), Dutch politician
- Thomas Berge (born 1990), Dutch singer

=== Sport ===
- Andy Scharmin (1967–1989), Surinamese-Dutch footballer
- Erik ten Hag (born 1970), footballer with 336 club caps and football manager
- Niki Leferink (born 1976), footballer with 350 club caps
- Bram Tankink (born 1978), cyclist
- Shirley van der Lof (born 1986), racing driver

== Gallery ==
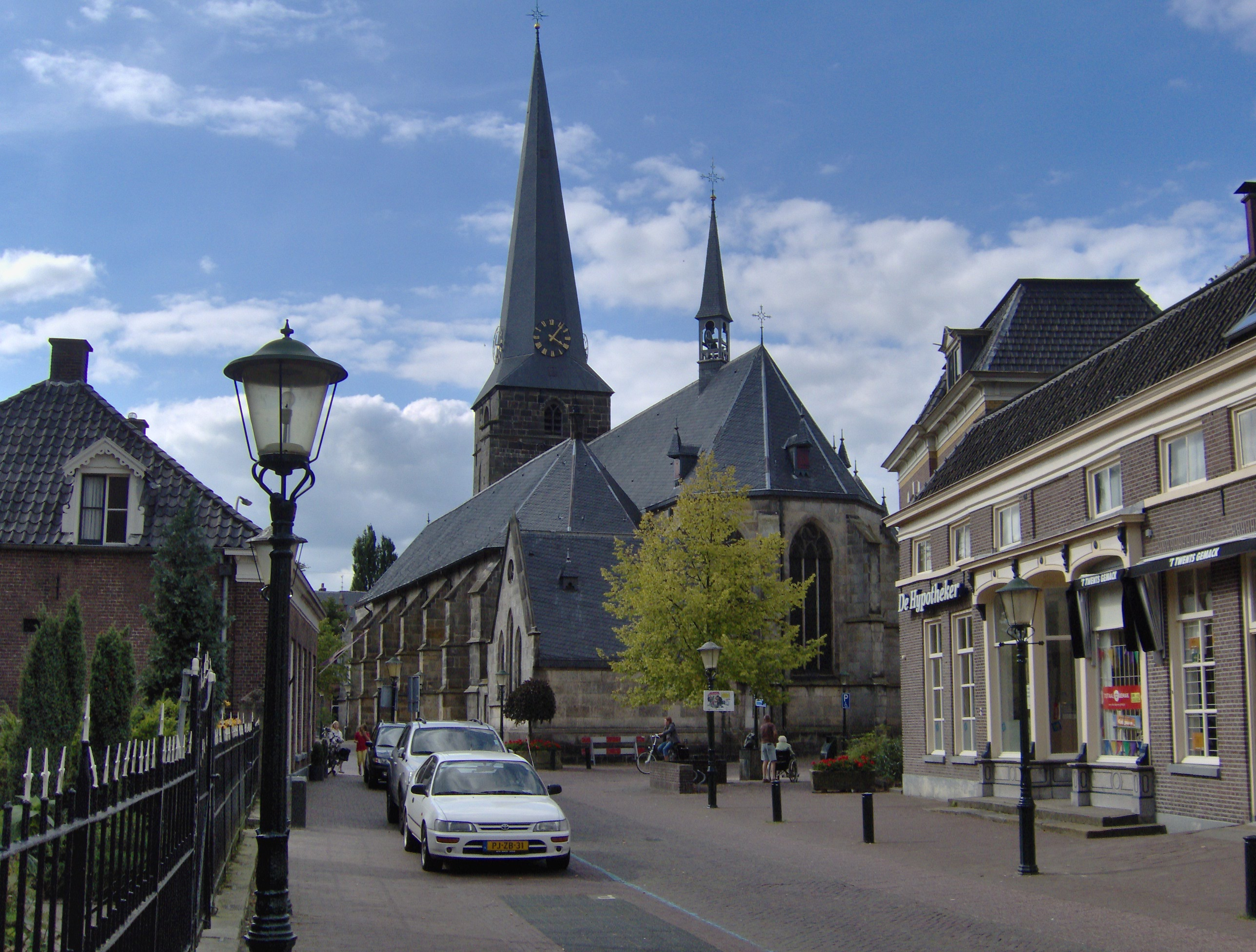
The Pancratius Church in the center of Haaksbergen

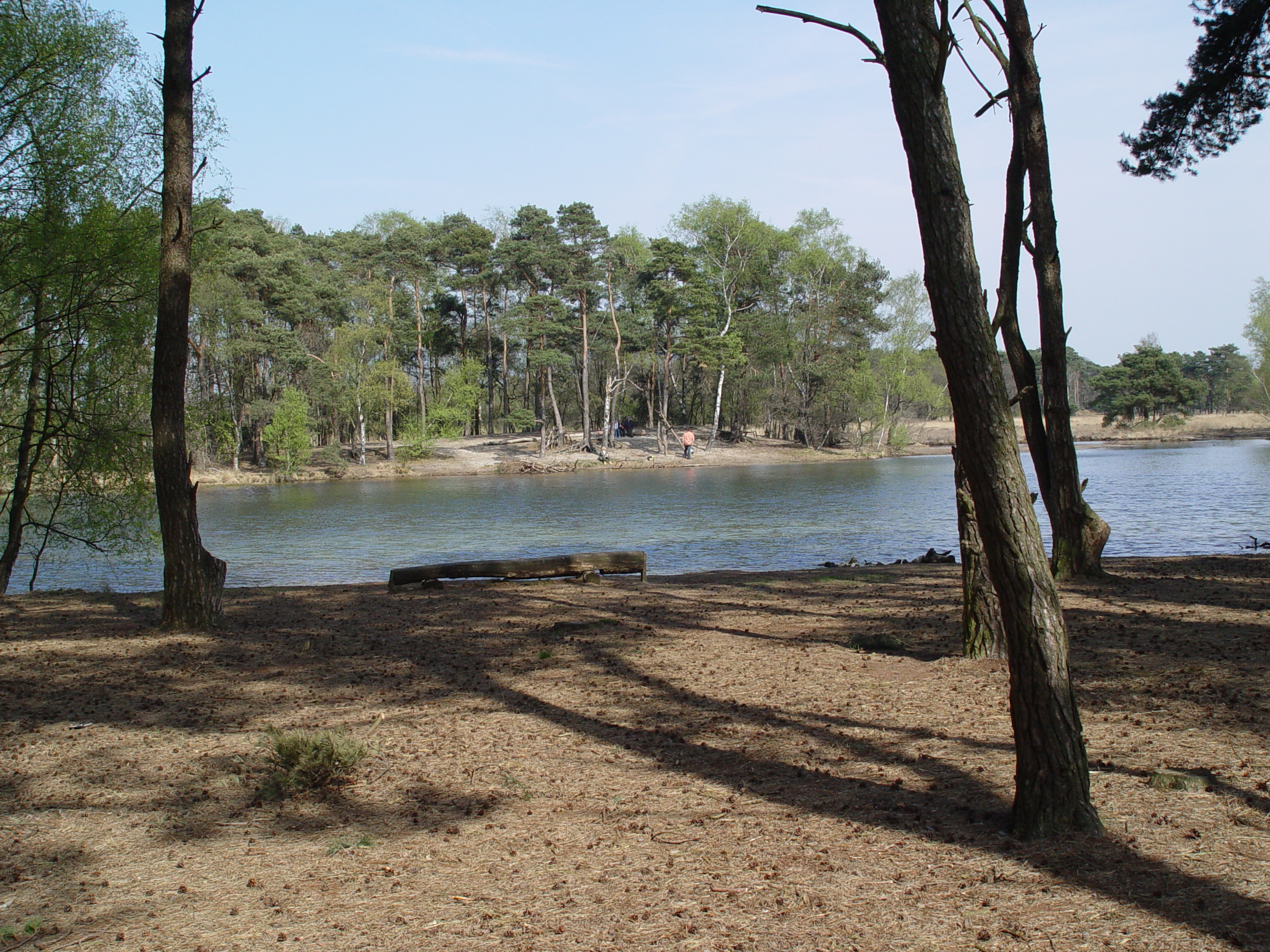
Buursermeertje - panoramio

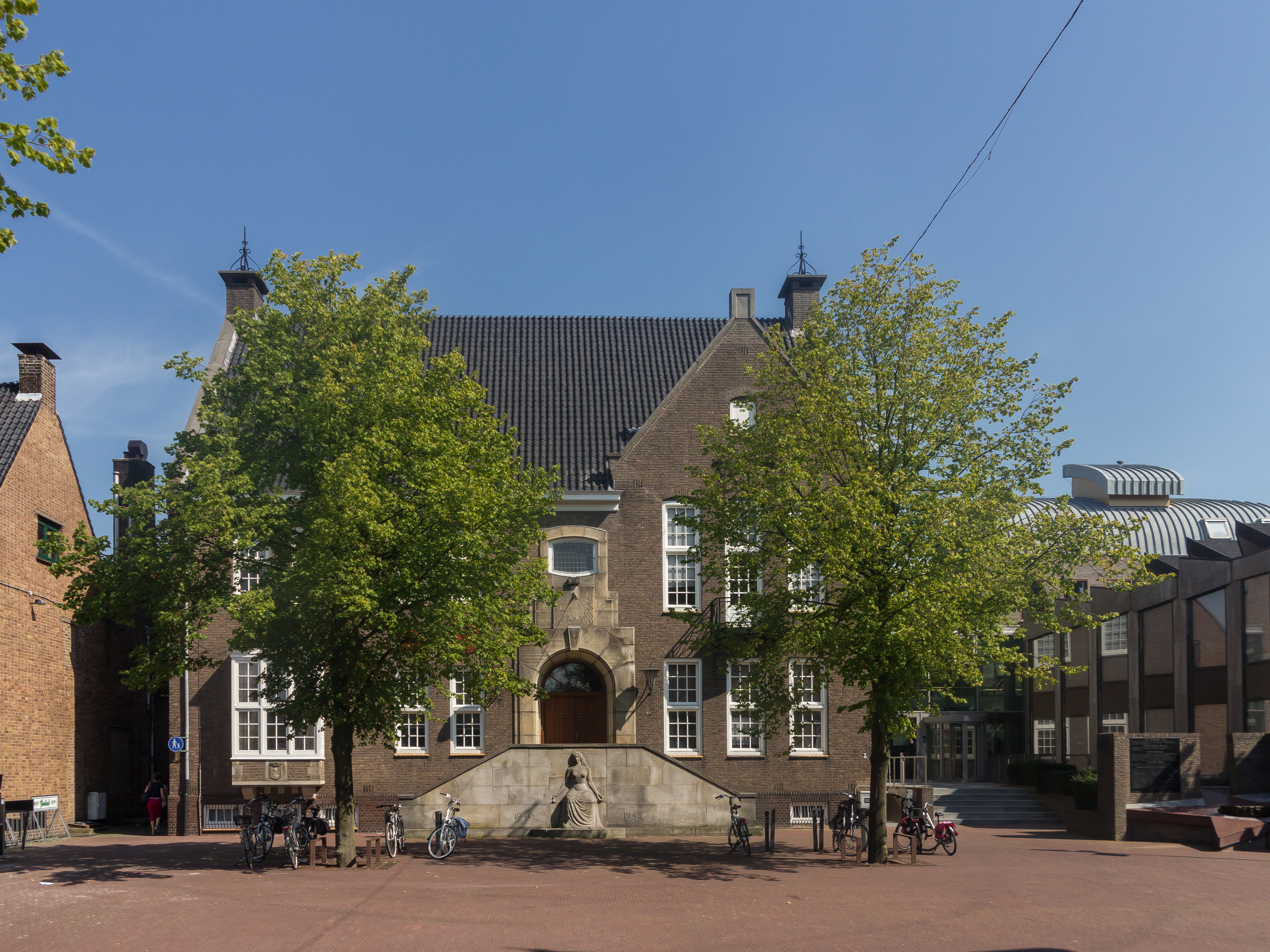
Haaksbergen Town hall

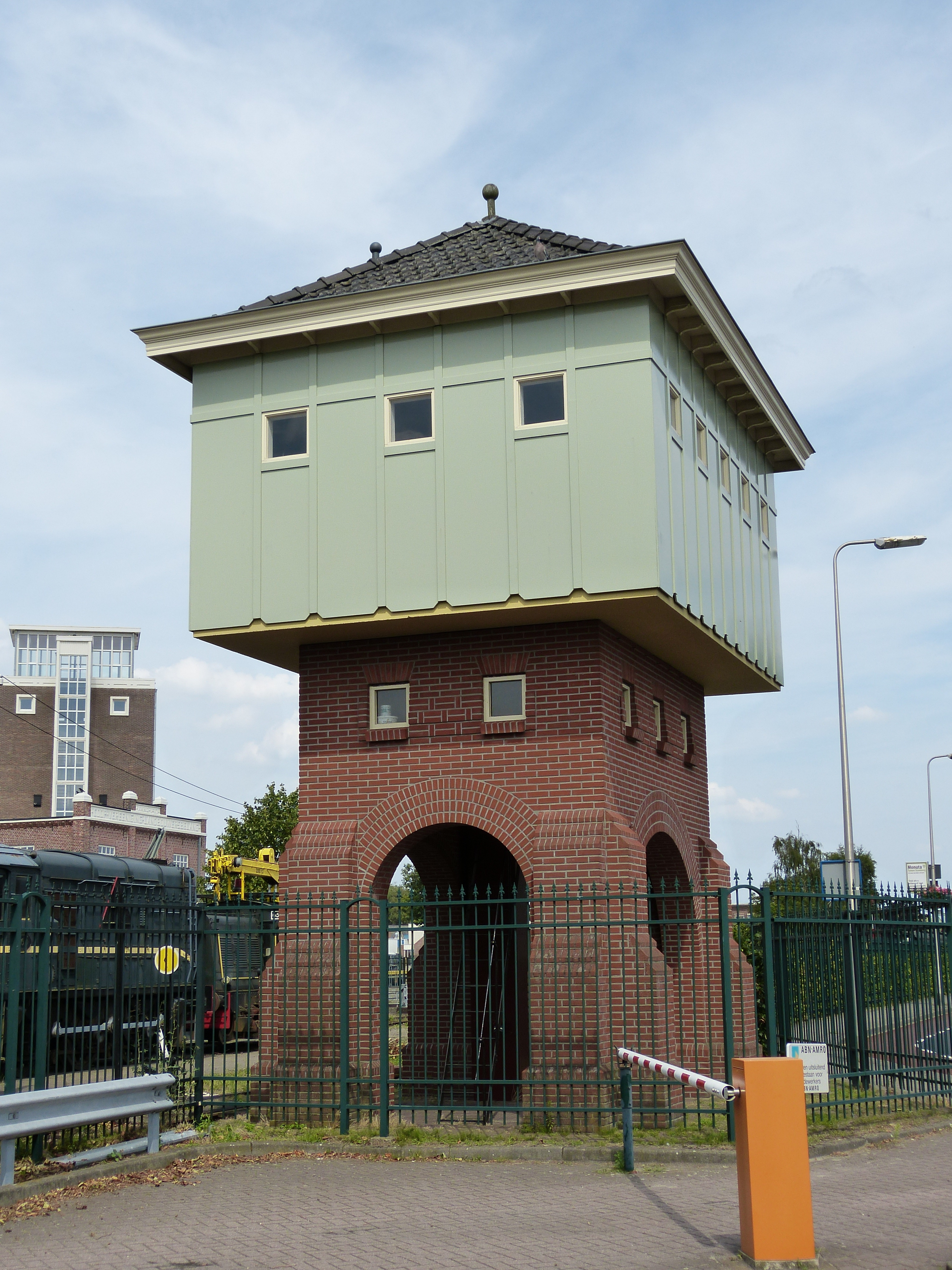
Haaksbergen Stationsstraat Watertoren

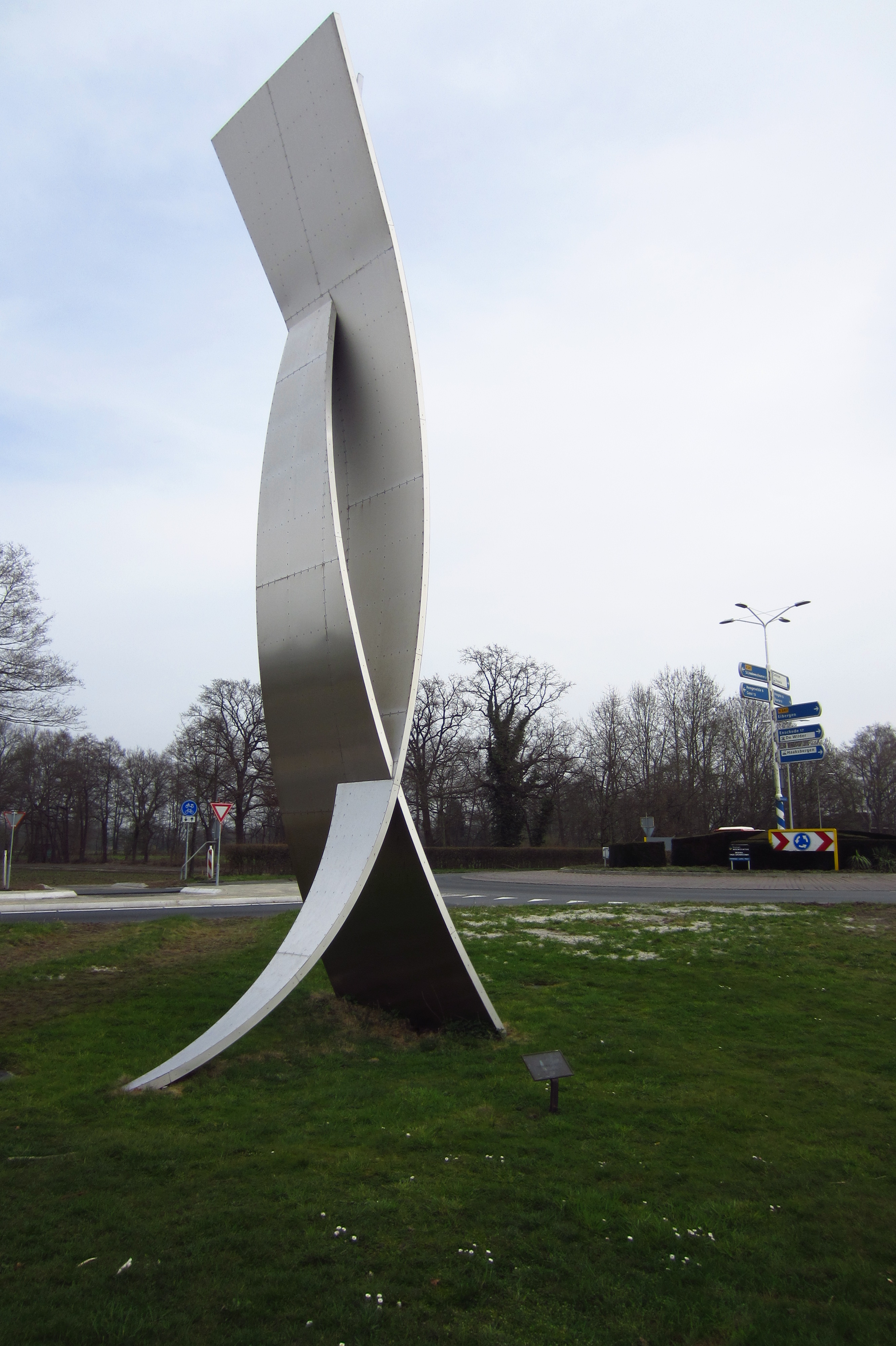
Hans Morselt 1995 Spankracht

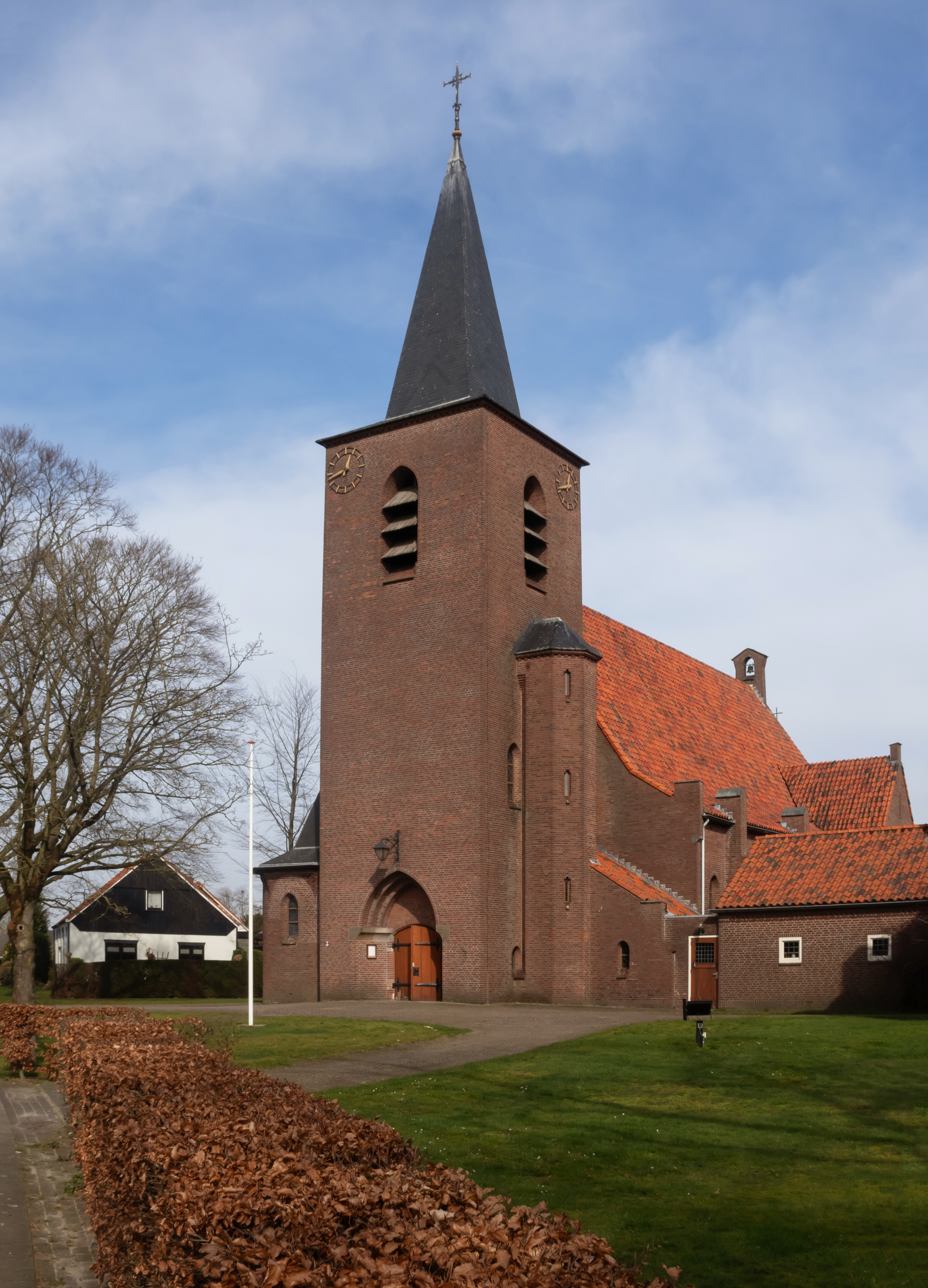
Catholic church in Buurse

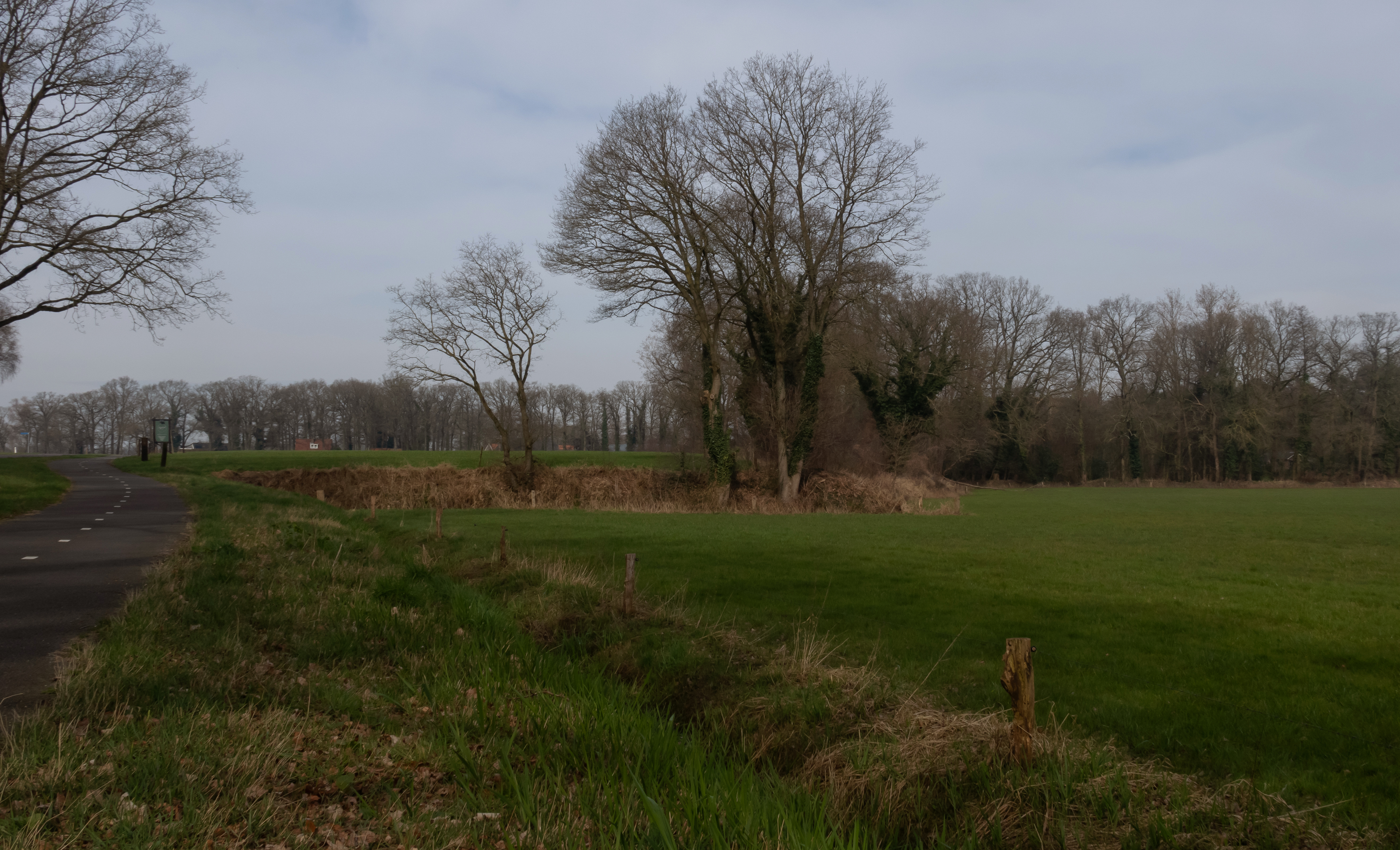
Panorama from Altsteedseweg-Witteveenweg between Buurse and Altstätte
