= 2007 German Formula Three Championship =

Seasons
- ← 2006 2008 →

The 2007 ATS F3 cup was the fifth edition of the German F3 Cup. It commenced on 28 April 2007 and ended on 30 September after eighteen races. The title was won by Carlo van Dam in penultimate Sachsenring round.

== Teams and drivers ==
2007 Entry List
Team	No.	Driver	Chassis	Engine	Status	Rounds
Cup Class
(Belgium) JB Motorsport	1	(Belgium) Nico Verdonck	Lola B06/30/HU01	OPC-Challenge	R	All
(Belgium) JB Motorsport	2	(Belgium) Frédéric Vervisch	Lola B06/30/HU02	OPC-Challenge	R	All
(Germany) Josef Kaufmann Racing	5	(Germany) Christian Vietoris	Dallara F305/027	OPC-Challenge	R	All
(Germany) Josef Kaufmann Racing	6	(Germany) Johannes Theobald	Ligier JS47/01	Opel		3
(Netherlands) Van Amersfoort Racing	7	(South Korea) Récardo Bruins Choi	Dallara F306/023	OPC-Challenge		All
(Netherlands) Van Amersfoort Racing	8	(Netherlands) Carlo van Dam	Dallara F305/046	OPC-Challenge	R	All
(Italy) Ombra Racing	11	(Italy) Matteo Chinosi	Dallara F305/064	Mugen-Honda	R	All
(Italy) Ombra Racing	12	(Italy) Federico Glorioso	Dallara F306/007	Mugen-Honda		1–7, 9
(Switzerland) Bordoli Motorsport	14	(Italy) Massimo Rossi	Dallara F305/026	Opel	R	1–2
(Switzerland) Bordoli Motorsport	14	(Switzerland) Jonathan Hirschi	Dallara F305/026	Opel	R	7–9
(Switzerland) Swiss Racing Team	16	(Sweden) Max Nilsson	Dallara F305/034	OPC-Challenge		All
(Switzerland) Swiss Racing Team	17	(Switzerland) Patrick Cicchiello	Dallara F305/004	OPC-Challenge	R	1–2
(Switzerland) Swiss Racing Team	17	(Brazil) Marcello Thomaz	Dallara F305/004	OPC-Challenge		3
(Switzerland) Swiss Racing Team	17	(Netherlands) Dominick Muermans	Dallara F305/004	OPC-Challenge		5–9
(Germany) Team rhino's Leipert	18	(Germany) Norman Knop	Dallara F305/040	OPC-Challenge		All
(Germany) Team rhino's Leipert	19	(Switzerland) Radi Müller	Dallara F305/063	OPC-Challenge		3
(Germany) Team rhino's Leipert	19	(Italy) Massimo Rossi	Dallara F305/063	OPC-Challenge	R	4–9
(Germany) Rennsport Rössler	20	(Netherlands) Ross Zwolsman	Dallara F305/024	OPC-Challenge		1, 4
(Germany) Rennsport Rössler	20	(Angola) Ricardo Teixeira	Dallara F305/024	OPC-Challenge		7
(Germany) Rennsport Rössler	20	(Germany) Dominik Schraml	Dallara F305/024	OPC-Challenge		8
(Luxembourg) Racing Experience	23	(Luxembourg) David Hauser	Mygale M07/00	Opel	R	6–7
Trophy Class
(Austria) HS Technik Motorsport	50	(Germany) Michael Klein	Dallara F303/026	OPC-Challenge	R	All
(Germany) Schuler Motorsport	52	(Germany) Marcel Schuler	Dallara F303/006	OPC-Challenge		All
(Germany) JMS Motorsport	54	(Germany) Kevin Fank	Dallara F302/084	Opel		1, 3
(Austria) Franz Wöss Racing	56	(Germany) Francesco Lopez	Dallara F303/007	Opel	R	5
(Austria) Franz Wöss Racing	56	(Austria) Michael Aberer	Dallara F303/007	Opel	R	1
(Austria) Franz Wöss Racing	57	(Austria) Stefan Neuburger	Dallara F302/050	Opel		5
(Czech Republic) KFR Team F3	59	(Slovakia) Leonardo Valois	Dallara F302/044	OPC-Challenge	R	3–7
(Germany) Team rhino's Leipert	62	(Italy) Luca Iannaccone	Dallara F302/060	Renault		All
(Germany) Team rhino's Leipert	63	(Germany) Simon Solgat	Dallara F304/012	OPC-Challenge	R	All
(Germany) Rennsport Rössler	66	(Germany) Falk Künster	Dallara F302/038	OPC-Challenge	R	1, 3–4, 7–9
(Finland) ADRF	68	(Russia) Yegor Popov	Dallara F302/074	Opel		1
(Italy) Ombra Racing	69	(Italy) Marika Diana	Dallara F302/075	Mugen-Honda		1–5, 7
(Germany) Bernd Deuling	70	(Germany) Bernd Deuling	Dallara F302/009	Opel		2, 4, 6
(Germany) Christian Zeller	71	(Germany) Christian Zeller	Dallara F302/009	Opel		4

Icon	Status
R	Rookie

== Calendar ==
With the exception of two rounds at TT Circuit Assen, all rounds took place on German soil.

Round		Location	Circuit	Date	Supporting
1	R1	Hockenheim, Germany	Hockenheimring	28 April	Jim Clark Revival
1	R2	Hockenheim, Germany	Hockenheimring	29 April	Jim Clark Revival
2	R1	Oschersleben, Germany	Motorsport Arena Oschersleben	12 May	Top10 Racing Weekend
2	R2	Oschersleben, Germany	Motorsport Arena Oschersleben	13 May	Top10 Racing Weekend
3	R1	Nürburg, Germany	Nürburgring	8 June	24 Hours Nürburgring
3	R2	Nürburg, Germany	Nürburgring	9 June	24 Hours Nürburgring
4	R1	Nürburg, Germany	Nürburgring	7 July	ADAC Truck Grand Prix
4	R2	Nürburg, Germany	Nürburgring	8 July	ADAC Truck Grand Prix
5	R1	Klettwitz, Germany	EuroSpeedway Lausitz	4 August	ADAC GT Masters
5	R2	Klettwitz, Germany	EuroSpeedway Lausitz	5 August	ADAC GT Masters
6	R1	Assen, Netherlands	TT Circuit Assen	11 August	Rizla Race Day
6	R2	Assen, Netherlands	TT Circuit Assen	12 August	Rizla Race Day
7	R1	Assen, Netherlands	TT Circuit Assen	1 September	Dutch ChampCar Grand Prix
7	R2	Assen, Netherlands	TT Circuit Assen	2 September	Dutch ChampCar Grand Prix
8	R1	Saxony, Germany	Sachsenring	15 September	ADAC GT Masters
8	R2	Saxony, Germany	Sachsenring	16 September	ADAC GT Masters
9	R1	Oschersleben, Germany	Motorsport Arena Oschersleben	29 September	Top10 Racing Weekend
9	R2	Oschersleben, Germany	Motorsport Arena Oschersleben	30 September	Top10 Racing Weekend

== Results ==
Round		Circuit	Pole position	Fastest lap	Winning driver	Winning team	Trophy winner
1	R1	Hockenheimring	(Netherlands) Carlo van Dam	(Belgium) Frédéric Vervisch	(Belgium) Frédéric Vervisch	(Belgium) JB Motorsport	(Germany) Marcel Schuler
1	R2	Hockenheimring	(Netherlands) Carlo van Dam	(Belgium) Frédéric Vervisch	(Netherlands) Carlo van Dam	(Netherlands) Van Amersfoort Racing	(Germany) Marcel Schuler
2	R1	Motorsport Arena Oschersleben	(Belgium) Nico Verdonck	(South Korea) Récardo Bruins Choi	(Belgium) Nico Verdonck	(Belgium) JB Motorsport	(Germany) Marcel Schuler
2	R2	Motorsport Arena Oschersleben	(Netherlands) Carlo van Dam	(Netherlands) Carlo van Dam	(Netherlands) Carlo van Dam	(Netherlands) Van Amersfoort Racing	(Germany) Michael Klein
3	R1	Nürburgring	(Netherlands) Carlo van Dam	(Netherlands) Carlo van Dam	(Netherlands) Carlo van Dam	(Netherlands) Van Amersfoort Racing	(Germany) Marcel Schuler
3	R2	Nürburgring	(Netherlands) Carlo van Dam	(Belgium) Frédéric Vervisch	(Belgium) Frédéric Vervisch	(Belgium) JB Motorsport	(Germany) Michael Klein
4	R1	Nürburgring	(Germany) Christian Vietoris	(Belgium) Frédéric Vervisch	(South Korea) Récardo Bruins Choi	(Netherlands) Van Amersfoort Racing	(Germany) Michael Klein
4	R2	Nürburgring	(Netherlands) Carlo van Dam	(Netherlands) Carlo van Dam	(Germany) Christian Vietoris	(Germany) Josef Kaufmann Racing	(Germany) Michael Klein
5	R1	EuroSpeedway Lausitz	(Germany) Christian Vietoris	(Belgium) Frédéric Vervisch	(Belgium) Frédéric Vervisch	(Belgium) JB Motorsport	(Germany) Michael Klein
5	R2	EuroSpeedway Lausitz	(Netherlands) Carlo van Dam	(Belgium) Frédéric Vervisch	(Netherlands) Carlo van Dam	(Netherlands) Van Amersfoort Racing	(Germany) Marcel Schuler
6	R1	TT Circuit Assen	(Netherlands) Carlo van Dam	(Belgium) Nico Verdonck	(Netherlands) Carlo van Dam	(Netherlands) Van Amersfoort Racing	(Germany) Michael Klein
6	R2	TT Circuit Assen	(Netherlands) Carlo van Dam	(Netherlands) Carlo van Dam	(Netherlands) Carlo van Dam	(Netherlands) Van Amersfoort Racing	(Germany) Michael Klein
7	R1	TT Circuit Assen	(South Korea) Récardo Bruins Choi	(Netherlands) Carlo van Dam	(Netherlands) Carlo van Dam	(Netherlands) Van Amersfoort Racing	(Germany) Michael Klein
7	R2	TT Circuit Assen	(South Korea) Récardo Bruins Choi	(South Korea) Récardo Bruins Choi	(South Korea) Récardo Bruins Choi	(Netherlands) Van Amersfoort Racing	(Germany) Marcel Schuler
8	R1	Sachsenring	(Germany) Christian Vietoris	(Germany) Christian Vietoris	(Germany) Christian Vietoris	(Germany) Josef Kaufmann Racing	(Germany) Michael Klein
8	R2	Sachsenring	(Germany) Christian Vietoris	(Netherlands) Carlo van Dam	(Netherlands) Carlo van Dam	(Netherlands) Van Amersfoort Racing	(Germany) Michael Klein
9	R1	Motorsport Arena Oschersleben	(Netherlands) Carlo van Dam	(Belgium) Frédéric Vervisch	(Belgium) Frédéric Vervisch	(Belgium) JB Motorsport	(Germany) Simon Solgat
9	R2	Motorsport Arena Oschersleben	(Belgium) Frédéric Vervisch	(Netherlands) Carlo van Dam	(Netherlands) Carlo van Dam	(Netherlands) Van Amersfoort Racing	(Germany) Simon Solgat

== Standings ==
=== ATS Formel 3 Cup ===
- Points are awarded as follows:

1	2	3	4	5	6	7	8	PP	FL
10	8	6	5	4	3	2	1	**1**	1

Pos	Driver	HOC		OSC1		NÜR1		NÜR2		LAU		ASS1		ASS2		SAC		OSC2		Pts
1	(Netherlands) Carlo van Dam	**2**	**1**	3	**1**	**1**	**8**	2	**3**	4	**1**	**1**	**1**	1	3	3	1	**3**	1	159
2	(Belgium) Frédéric Vervisch	1	2	2	2	6	1	4	6	1	16†	2	4	4	5	2	2	1	**3**	127
3	(Belgium) Nico Verdonck	4	3	**1**	6	2	4	3	4	2	3	3	9	3	4	14†	4	2	5	98
4	(South Korea) Récardo Bruins Choi	3	4	4	5	11	3	1	2	5	5	6	2	**5**	**1**	4	5	Ret	4	95
5	(Germany) Christian Vietoris	5	7	5	Ret	3	2	**5**	1	**3**	2	7	3	6	6	**1**	Ret			81
6	(Italy) Matteo Chinosi	8	5	6	4	4	6	10	5	6	4	4	5	2	2	10	3	4	2	77
7	(Germany) Michael Klein	12	10	Ret	3	17	7	6	7	7	9	5	7	8	17	5	6	10	11	29
8	(Sweden) Max Nilsson	9	6	7	7	13	10	7	Ret	9	7	10	11	7	7	15†	Ret	DNS	DNS	15
9	(Germany) Marcel Schuler	7	8	8	Ret	8	12	11	Ret	10	8	11	10	9	8	7	8	6	Ret	13
10	(Netherlands) Dominick Muermans									8	6	8	6	Ret	Ret	DNS	7	8	8	12
11	(Germany) Simon Solgat	11	12	10	8	10	Ret	12	13	11	10	13	13	10	9	6	9	5	7	10
12	(Italy) Federico Glorioso	15	Ret	9	9	5	9	9	8	Ret	12	9	8	Ret	DNS			14†	6	9
13	(Brazil) Marcello Thomaz					7	5													6
14	(Switzerland) Patrick Cicchiello	6	11	Ret	17															3
15	(Switzerland) Jonathan Hirschi													13	10	8	10	7	9	3
16	(Netherlands) Ross Zwolsman	10	9					8	Ret											1
17	(Germany) Norman Knop	14	13	11	10	Ret	DNS	19	14	12	Ret	12	12	11	13	9	12	13	10	0
18	(Germany) Falk Künster	19	16			18	Ret	15	11					Ret	18	12	Ret	9	Ret	0
19	(Italy) Marika Diana	16	15	13	11	14	13	14	9	Ret	14			Ret	14					0
20	(Germany) Johannes Theobald					9	11													0
21	(Slovakia) Leonardo Valois					12	14	13	10	14	11	15	15	DNS	15					0
22	(Italy) Massimo Rossi	18	14	12	12			16	12	13	Ret	16	17	DNS	DNS	11	13	11	12	0
23	(Angola) Ricardo Teixeira													14	11					0
24	(Germany) Dominik Schraml															DNS	11			0
25	(Luxembourg) David Hauser											14	14	12	12					0
26	(Italy) Luca Iannaccone	21	17	15	14	19	17	18	16	16	15	18	18	15	16	13	14	12	13	0
27	(Germany) Bernd Deuling			14	13			20†	Ret			17	16							0
28	(Germany) Kevin Fank	13	Ret			15	15													0
29	(Germany) Francesco Lopez									15	13									0
30	(Germany) Christian Zeller							17	15											0
31	(Switzerland) Radi Müller					16	16													0
32	(Russia) Yegor Popov	17	18																	0
33	(Austria) Michael Aberer	20	19†																	0
	(Austria) Stefan Neuburger									Ret	DNS									0
Pos	Driver	HOC		OSC1		NÜR1		NÜR2		LAU		ASS1		ASS2		SAC		OSC2		Pts

Colour	Result
Gold	Winner
Silver	Second place
Bronze	Third place
Green	Points classification
Blue	Non-points classification
Blue	Non-classified finish (NC)
Purple	Retired, not classified (Ret)
Red	Did not qualify (DNQ)
Red	Did not pre-qualify (DNPQ)
Black	Disqualified (DSQ)
White	Did not start (DNS)
White	Withdrew (WD)
White	Race cancelled (C)
Blank	Did not practice (DNP)
Blank	Did not arrive (DNA)
Blank	Excluded (EX)

**Bold** – Pole
Italics – Fastest Lap
**W** – Wet Race

=== ATS Formel 3 Trophy ===
- Points are awarded as follows:

1	2	3	4	5	6	7	8
10	8	6	5	4	3	2	1

Pos	Driver	HOC		OSC1		NÜR1		NÜR2		LAU		ASS1		ASS2		SAC		OSC2		Pts
1	(Germany) Michael Klein	12	10	Ret	3	17	7	6	7	7	9	5	7	8	17	5	6	10	11	141
2	(Germany) Marcel Schuler	7	8	8	Ret	8	12	11	Ret	10	8	11	10	9	8	7	8	6	Ret	130
3	(Germany) Simon Solgat	11	12	10	8	10	Ret	12	13	11	10	13	13	10	9	6	9	5	7	120
4	(Italy) Luca Iannaccone	21	17	15	14	19	17	18	16	16	15	18	18	15	16	13	14	12	13	57
5	(Italy) Marika Diana	16	15	13	11	14	13	14	9	Ret	14			Ret	14					53
6	(Slovakia) Leonardo Valois					12	14	13	10	14	11	15	15	DNS	15					47
7	(Germany) Falk Künster	19	16			18	Ret	15	11					Ret	18	12	Ret	9	Ret	29
8	(Germany) Bernd Deuling			14	13			20†	Ret			17	16							18
9	(Germany) Kevin Fank	13	Ret			15	15													13
10	(Germany) Francesco Lopez									15	13									8
11	(Russia) Yegor Popov	17	18																	5
12	(Germany) Christian Zeller							17	15											5
13	(Austria) Michael Aberer	20	19†																	2
Pos	Driver	HOC		OSC1		NÜR1		NÜR2		LAU		ASS1		ASS2		SAC		OSC2		Pts

Colour	Result
Gold	Winner
Silver	Second place
Bronze	Third place
Green	Points classification
Blue	Non-points classification
Blue	Non-classified finish (NC)
Purple	Retired, not classified (Ret)
Red	Did not qualify (DNQ)
Red	Did not pre-qualify (DNPQ)
Black	Disqualified (DSQ)
White	Did not start (DNS)
White	Withdrew (WD)
White	Race cancelled (C)
Blank	Did not practice (DNP)
Blank	Did not arrive (DNA)
Blank	Excluded (EX)

- † — Drivers did not finish the race, but were classified as they completed over 90% of the race distance.

=== ATS Formel 3 Junior-Pokal (Rookie) ===
- Points are awarded for both races as follows:

Pos	1	2	3	4	5	6	7	8
Points	10	8	6	5	4	3	2	1

Pos	Driver	HOC		OSC1		NÜR1		NÜR2		LAU		ASS1		ASS2		SAC		OSC2		Pts
1	(Netherlands) Carlo van Dam	**2**	**1**	3	**1**	**1**	**8**	2	**3**	4	**1**	**1**	**1**	1	3	3	1	**3**	1	150
2	(Belgium) Frédéric Vervisch	1	2	2	2	6	1	4	6	1	16	2	4	4	5	2	2	1	**3**	124
3	(Belgium) Nico Verdonck	4	3	**1**	6	2	4	3	4	2	3	3	9	3	4	14	4	2	5	107
4	(Italy) Matteo Chinosi	8	5	6	4	4	6	10	5	6	4	4	5	2	2	10	3	4	2	93
5	(Germany) Christian Vietoris	5	7	5	Ret	3	2	**5**	1	**3**	2	7	3	6	6	**1**	Ret			86
6	(Germany) Michael Klein	12	10	Ret	3	17	7	6	7	7	9	5	7	8	17	5	6	10	11	52
7	(Germany) Simon Solgat	11	12	10	8	10	Ret	12	13	11	10	13	13	10	9	6	9	5	7	43
8	(Switzerland) Jonathan Hirschi													13	10	8	10	7	9	13
9	(Slovakia) Leonardo Valois					12	14	13	10	14	11	15	15	DNS	15					9
10	(Italy) Massimo Rossi	18	14	12	12			16	12	13	Ret	16	17	DNS	DNS	11	13	11	12	8
11	(Switzerland) Patrick Cicchiello	6	11	Ret	17															7
12	(Luxembourg) David Hauser											14	14	12	12					4
13	(Germany) Falk Künster	19	16			18	Ret	15	11					Ret	18	12	Ret	9	Ret	3
14	(Germany) Francesco Lopez									15	13									1
Pos	Driver	HOC		OSC1		NÜR1		NÜR2		LAU		ASS1		ASS2		SAC		OSC2		Pts

Colour	Result
Gold	Winner
Silver	Second place
Bronze	Third place
Green	Points classification
Blue	Non-points classification
Blue	Non-classified finish (NC)
Purple	Retired, not classified (Ret)
Red	Did not qualify (DNQ)
Red	Did not pre-qualify (DNPQ)
Black	Disqualified (DSQ)
White	Did not start (DNS)
White	Withdrew (WD)
White	Race cancelled (C)
Blank	Did not practice (DNP)
Blank	Did not arrive (DNA)
Blank	Excluded (EX)

- † — Drivers did not finish the race, but were classified as they completed over 90% of the race distance.
