= HS Engineering =

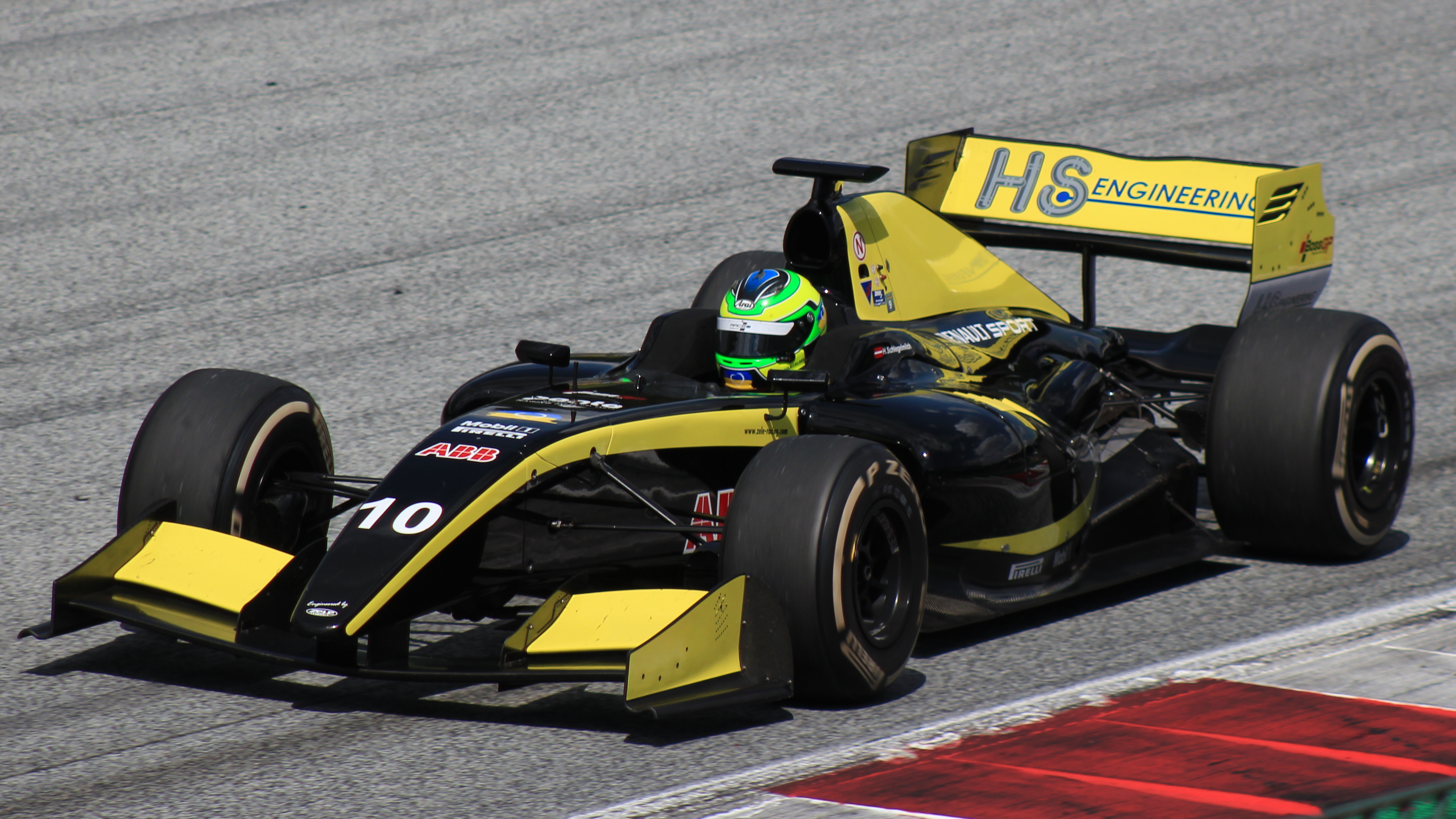
- Founded: 2003
- Team principal(s): Michael Hascic
- Current series: BOSS GP
- Former series: German Formula 3 Austria Formula 3 Cup; ADAC Formel Masters
- Drivers' Championships: German Formula 3: 2004: Bastian Kolmsee; 2006: Harald Schlegelmilch (Trophy); 2007: Michael Klein (Trophy); 2010: Tom Dillmann; Austria Formula 3 Cup: 2006: Harald Schlegelmilch; BOSS GP; 2022: Harald Schlegelmilch (Open)

HS Engineering is an Austrian motor racing team. It was founded in 2003 by Michael Hascic. HS Engineering always focussed on regional and continental championships in Germany and Europe. Until 2011, the team was known as HS Technik.

The team gained its first major success in the second year after its foundation, when Bastian Kolmsee won the 2004 German Formula 3 championship. After another win of the same championship in 2010 with Tom Dillmann, the team stepped away from single seaters from 2014 until 2021; where they fielded two Dallara T12's at select BOSS GP rounds in 2021, with the cars prepared by former Auto GP team Zele Racing.

== Former series results ==
=== German Formula 3 ===
German Formula Three Championship
Year	Car	Drivers	Races	Wins	Poles	F/Laps	Points	D.C.
2003	Dallara F301-Opel	(Austria) Roman Hoffmann	4	0	0	0	19	14th
2004	Dallara F301-Opel	(Germany) Bastian Kolmsee	18	4	3	4	217	1st
2004	Dallara F301-Opel	(Austria) Roman Hoffmann	4	0	0	0	0	26th
2005	Dallara F303-Opel	(Republic of Ireland) Michael Devaney	16	5	1	1	101	2nd
2005	Dallara F303-Opel	(Germany) Martin Hippe	18	1	1	1	64	6th
2005	Dallara F302-Opel	(Latvia) Harald Schlegelmilch	4	0	0	0	0	20th
2005	Dallara F302-Opel	(Belgium) Maxime Hodencq	2	0	0	0	0	23rd
2006	Lola B06/30-Opel	(Germany) Martin Hippe	1	0	0	0	0	32nd
2006	Lola B06/30-Opel	(Australia) Nathan Antunes	8	1	1	0	25	10th
2006	Lola B06/30-Opel	(United Kingdom) Joey Foster	12	4	3	6	76	6th
2006	Dallara F303-Opel; Lola B06/30-Opel	(Latvia) Harald Schlegelmilch	20	3	2	2	91	3rd
2007	Dallara F303-OPC-Challenge	(Germany) Michael Klein [T]	18	10	0	0	141	1st [T]
2008	Dallara F305-Mercedes	(Colombia) Sebastián Saavedra	18	3	4	2	99	2nd
2008	Dallara F306-Mercedes	(Austria) Philipp Eng	2	0	1	1	18	11th†
2008	Dallara F306-Mercedes	(Venezuela) Johnny Cecotto Jr.	16	2	3	4	99	3rd
2008	Dallara F303-OPC-Challenge	(Netherlands) Shirley van der Lof [T]	18	3	0	0	100	4th [T]
2009	Dallara F305-Mercedes	(Austria) Bernd Herndlhofer	10	0	0	0	32	8th†
2009	Dallara F305-Mercedes	(Latvia) Harald Schlegelmilch	8	0	0	0	30	9th
2009	Dallara F305-Mercedes	(Brazil) Rafael Suzuki	6	0	0	0	65	4th†
2009	Dallara F306-Mercedes	(Austria) Willi Steindl	14	0	0	0	19	11th
2009	Dallara F306-Mercedes	(United Kingdom) Joey Foster	4	0	0	0	0	NC‡
2010	Dallara F305-Volkswagen	(France) Tom Dillmann	18	6	7	10	120	1st
2010	Dallara F306-Volkswagen	(Austria) Kevin Friesacher	2	0	0	0	0	NC‡
2011	Dallara F305-Volkswagen	(Israel) Alon Day	18	0	1	2	62	4th
2011	Dallara F306-Volkswagen	(Germany) Patrick Schranner	8	0	0	0	17	11th
2011	Dallara F306-Volkswagen	(Germany) Riccardo Brutschin	7	0	0	0	8	13th‡
2012	Dallara F305-Volkswagen	(Germany) Luca Stolz [T]	11	5	0	0	184	5th [T]

† – Shared results with other teams ‡ – Guest driver, ineligible for points.

=== Formula 3 Euro Series ===
Formula 3 Euro Series
Year	Car	Drivers	Races	Wins	Poles	F/Laps	Points	D.C.	T.C.
2007	Dallara F306-Mercedes	(Latvia) Harald Schlegelmilch	20	1	0	0	9	14th	7th
2007	Dallara F305-Mercedes	(United Kingdom) Euan Hankey	20	0	0	0	0	23rd	7th
2011	Dallara F308-Volkswagen	(Israel) Alon Day	6	0	0	0	0	NC‡	NC‡

‡ – As Day was a guest driver, he was ineligible for points.

=== ADAC Formel Masters ===
ADAC Formel Masters
Year	Car	Drivers	Races	Wins	Poles	F/Laps	Points	D.C.	T.C.
2012	Dallara Formulino	(Germany) Felix Wieland	22	0	0	0	22	15th	5th
2012	Dallara Formulino	(Denmark) Nicolas Beer	12	0	0	0	13	16th	5th
2013	Dallara Formulino	(Kuwait) Zaid Ashkanani	3	0	0	0	0	21st	8th
2014	Dallara Formulino	(Austria) Corinna Kamper	6	0	0	0	2	16th	6th
