= Matteo Chinosi =

Italian racing driver

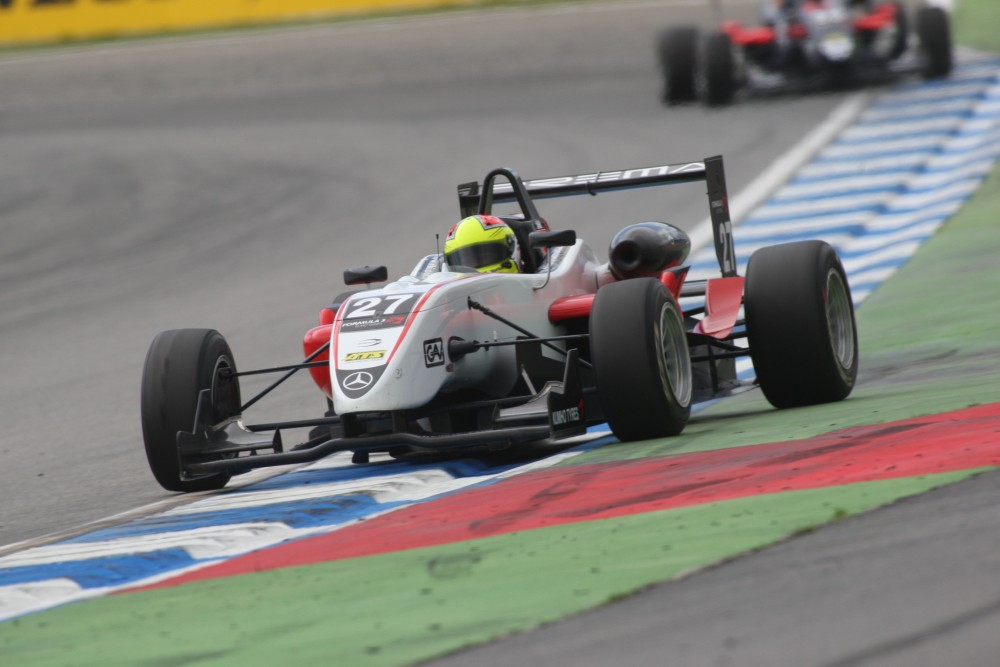
- Nationality: Italian
- Born: 14 February 1989 (age 37) Pavia (Italy)

Previous series
- 2009 2007–08 2007–08 2006 2005–06: Formula 3 Euro Series; German Formula Three; British Formula 3 Eurocup Formula Renault 2.0; Formula Renault 2.0 Italy; Karting

Matteo Chinosi (born 14 February 1989) is an Italian former racing driver.

== Career ==
=== Karting ===
Chinosi began his kart racing career at the age of nine. In 2002, he won the International Winter Cup at Lonato (Brescia), the Champions Cup at Ottobiano (Pavia), the Torneo Industrie at San Pancrazio (Parma) and he finished third in the Italian Open Masters final standings in the ICA-J class.

=== Formula Renault ===
Chinosi began his single-seater racing car career by driving in the Italian Formula Renault Championship with Prema Powerteam in 2005. The following season, Chinosi competed in both the Formula Renault 2.0 Italy and Eurocup Formula Renault 2.0 championships for RP Motorsport. He finished ninth in the Italian series standings, taking nine points-scoring positions in fourteen races, including a podium in the first race at Hockenheim. In the Eurocup, he was a guest driver at Misano.

=== Formula Three ===
In 2007, Chinosi stepped up to the ATS Formel 3 Cup with the Ombra Racing team. He finished sixth in the standings after taking four podium places. Also he appeared as a guest driver at Monza in British Formula 3. Chinosi remained in the series for 2008 with Ombra Racing. He finished fifth in the standings with two wins at Hockenheim and the Nürburgring. Again, he was a guest driver at Monza in British Formula 3 where he gained a pole position.

Chinosi moved to Prema Powerteam and the Formula 3 Euro Series in 2009 but left the series after the Zandvoort round. During the same season he finished eleventh in the 2009 Masters of Formula 3 at Zandvoort.

== Racing record ==
=== Career summary ===
Season	Series	Team	Races	Wins	Poles	F/Laps	Podiums	Points	Position
2005	Formula Renault 2.0 Italy	Prema Powerteam	17	0	0	0	0	6	25th
2006	Formula Renault 2.0 Italy	RP Motorsport	15	0	0	0	1	80	9th
2006	Eurocup Formula Renault 2.0	RP Motorsport	2	0	0	0	0	N/A	NC†
2007	German Formula Three	Ombra Racing	18	0	0	0	4	77	6th
2007	British Formula 3 Championship	Ombra Racing	2	0	0	0	0	N/A	NC†
2008	German Formula Three	Ombra Racing	16	2	2	0	7	73	5th
2008	British Formula 3 Championship	Ombra Racing	2	0	1	0	0	N/A	NC†
2009	Formula 3 Euro Series	Prema Powerteam	8	0	0	0	0	0	23rd
2009	Masters of Formula 3	Prema Powerteam	1	0	0	0	0	N/A	11th

† – As Chinosi was a guest driver, he was ineligible to score points.

=== Complete Eurocup Formula Renault 2.0 results ===
(key) (Races in bold indicate pole position; races in italics indicate fastest lap)

Year	Entrant	1	2	3	4	5	6	7	8	9	10	11	12	13	14	DC	Points
2006	RP Motorsport	ZOL; 1	ZOL; 2	IST; 1	IST; 2	MIS; 1; 15	MIS; 2; 26	NÜR; 1	NÜR; 2	DON; 1	DON; 2	LMS; 1	LMS; 2	CAT; 1	CAT; 2	NC†	0

† As Chinosi was a guest driver, he was ineligible for points
