= Karlīne Štāla =

Latvian racing driver

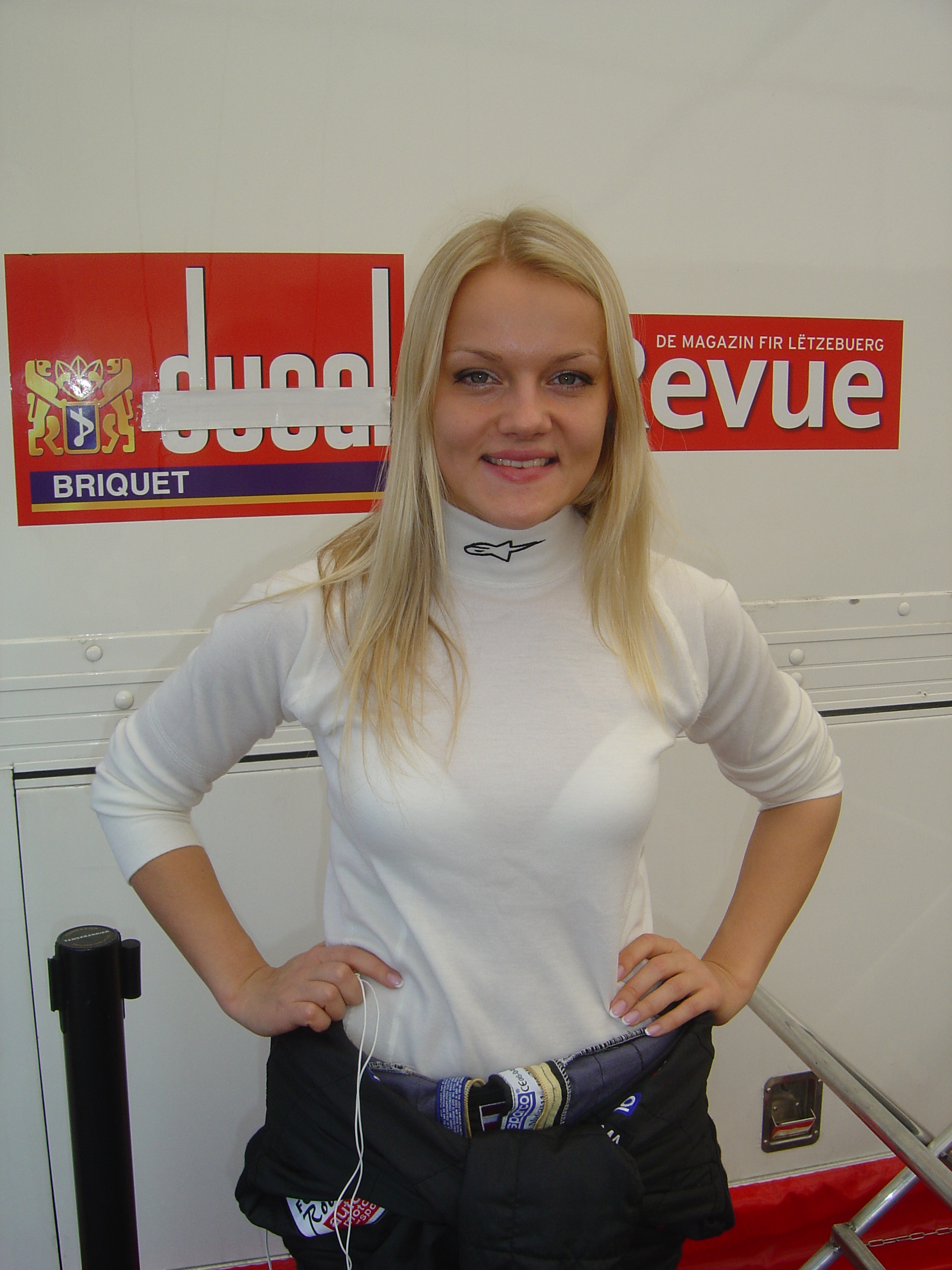
- Štāla in 2008
- Nationality: (Latvia) Latvian
- Born: 5 March 1986 (age 40) Riga, Latvian SSR, Soviet Union

ATS Formel 3 Cup Germany
- Years active: 2008
- Teams: Racing Experience; Swiss Racing Team
- Starts: 13
- Wins: 0
- Poles: 0
- Fastest laps: 0

Previous series
- 2006–2007: Formula Renault 1.6 Belgium

Championship titles
- 2007: Formula Renault 1.6 Belgium

Karlīne Štāla (born 5 March 1986) is a race car driver from Latvia.

== Career history ==
=== Karting ===
Stala enter in karting series in 2000.

- 2000 : 6th in Latvian championship, ICA junior class
- 2001 : Latvian championship, ICA junior class; Austrian championship, Rotax Max junior class
- 2002 : 5th in Latvian championship, Rotax max junior class; 7th in Austrian championship, Rotax max junior class
- 2003 : 2nd in Latvian championship, Rotax max junior class; 4th in Austrian Rotax max championship; 19th in the Euro Rotax Max challenge
- 2004 : 8th in Euro Rotax max challenge; Participate to the Master of Sports of Latvia

=== Touring racing ===
In 2003 and 2004 she competed in the Estland Toyota Yaris Cup with a Toyota Yaris.

- 2003 : 12th in Yaris Cup (only Parnu round)
- 2004 : 9th in Yaris Cup (only Riga2 round)
- 2005 : 8th in Finnish championship in Legends category with a 1937 Ford

=== Formula racing ===
In 2003, Štāla tested a Formula Ford and a Formula BMW.

In 2006, Štāla competed in the Belgian Formula Renault 1.6 championship finishing 15 overall (11 points) with the MRD Motorsport Europe team.

In 2007, with team Team Astromega, Štāla won the Belgian Formula Renault 1.6 championship with 178 points, 2 wins, 10 podiums and 2 fastest laps. She was invited to test the World Series by Renault car (Formula Renault 3.5L) at the Circuit Paul Ricard in November 2007 with Fortec Motorsport team, like the best 2.0L and 3.5L drivers.

== Racing record ==
=== Career summary ===
Season	Series	Team	Races	Wins	Poles	F/Laps	Podiums	Points	Position
2005	Legends Trophy Finland	Team Nurminen/Waden	?	?	?	?	?	412	9th
2006	Formula Renault 1.6 Belgium	MRD Motorsport Europe	11	0	0	0	0	38	15th
2007	Formula Renault 1.6 Belgium	Astromega Racing	12	2	0	2	10	178	1st
2008	German Formula 3 Championship	Racing Experience	7	0	0	0	0	0	NC
2008	German Formula 3 Championship	Swiss Racing Team	6	0	0	0	0	0	NC
2008	Finnish Formula 3 Championship	T.T. Racing Team	2	0	0	0	0	?	?
2013	Mitjet 2L		4	0	0	0	0	150	45th
