= Shirley van der Lof =

Dutch racing driver

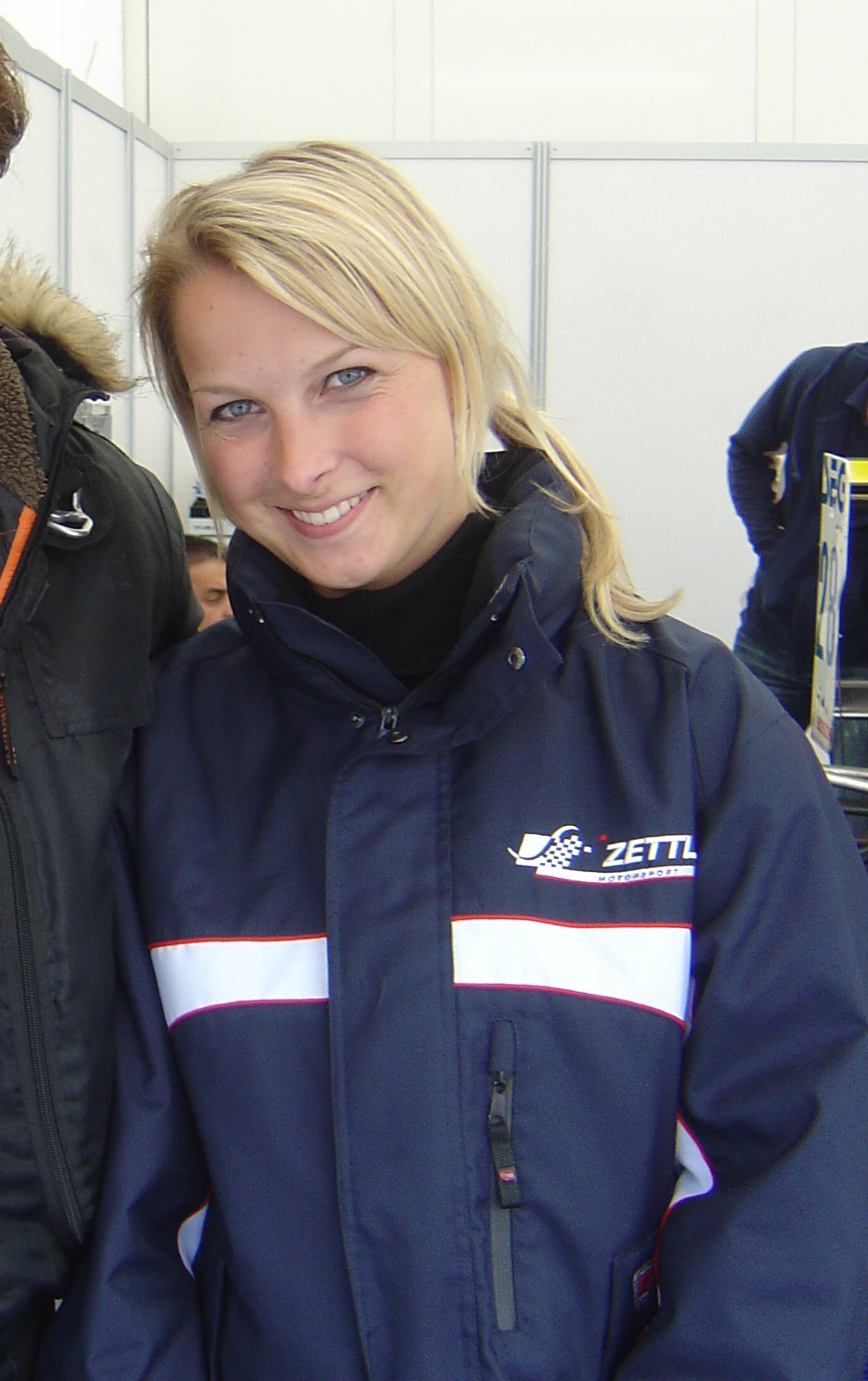
- Van der Lof in 2009.
- Nationality: (Netherlands) Dutch
- Born: November 7, 1986 (age 40) Haaksbergen
- Relatives: Dries van der Lof (grandfather)

ATS Formel 3 Trophy career
- Debut season: 2008
- Current team: HS Technik Motorsport

Shirley van der Lof (born November 7, 1986, in Haaksbergen, Overijssel) is a racing driver from the Netherlands, and grand daughter of former Formula One-driver Dries van der Lof. Besides her racing career, she has studied "real estate and broking".

Van der Lof first started driving in go-karts at age 14, and was immediately hooked to the speed. In 2001, at age 15, she won her first go-karting championship. In 2006, she started in the Benelux Formula Ford championship. Her first years in auto racing resulted in a fair number of crashes, but also a fair share of success.

In 2008, van der Lof started racing in the ATS Formel 3 Trophy for HS Technik Motorsport in a Dallara F304 OPC Challenge. In the first 8 races of her debut season, she finished on the podium four times: two times in third place and two times in second place. In 2019, she tested for the W series but was not selected.
