= Johnny Cecotto Jr. =

German and Venezuelan racing driver (born 1989)

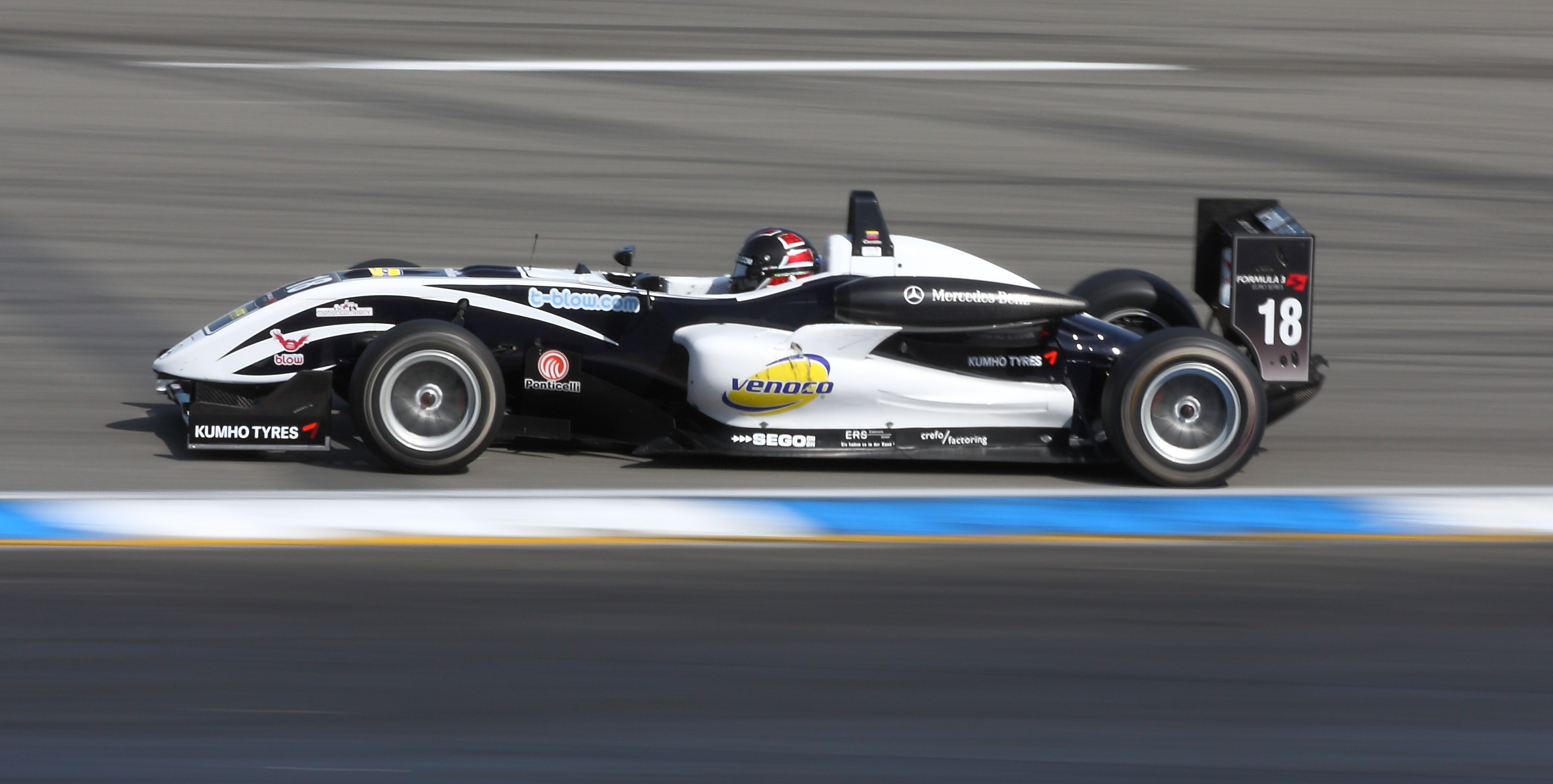
- Nationality: (Venezuela) Venezuelan (Germany) German
- Born: Johnny Amadeus Cecotto; 9 September 1989 (age 37) Augsburg, West Germany
- Relatives: Johnny Cecotto (father)

FIA Formula 2 Championship career
- Debut season: 2017
- Car number: 19
- Former teams: Rapax
- Starts: 8
- Wins: 0
- Podiums: 1
- Poles: 0
- Fastest laps: 0
- Best finish: 16th in 2017

Previous series
- 2009-16 2009–10–2011 2009 2007 2007 2006, 2008 2006 2006 2006–07 2006–07 2005 2005 2005: GP2 Series; GP2 Asia Series; Formula 3 Euro Series; International Formula Master; British Formula 3 German Formula Three; Formula Renault NEC; Formula Renault 2.0 Italia; Euroseries 3000; Italian Formula 3000; Formula BMW ADAC; Formula Junior 1600 Italy; FR2.0 Italia Winter Series

Johnny Amadeus Cecotto (born 9 September 1989), more commonly known as Johnny Cecotto Jr., is a Venezuelan and German former racing driver. He competed in nine seasons of the GP2 Series and won four races, and also tested in Formula One for Force India and Toro Rosso. He is the son of former F1 driver and motorcycle world champion Johnny Cecotto.

== Career ==
=== Early career ===
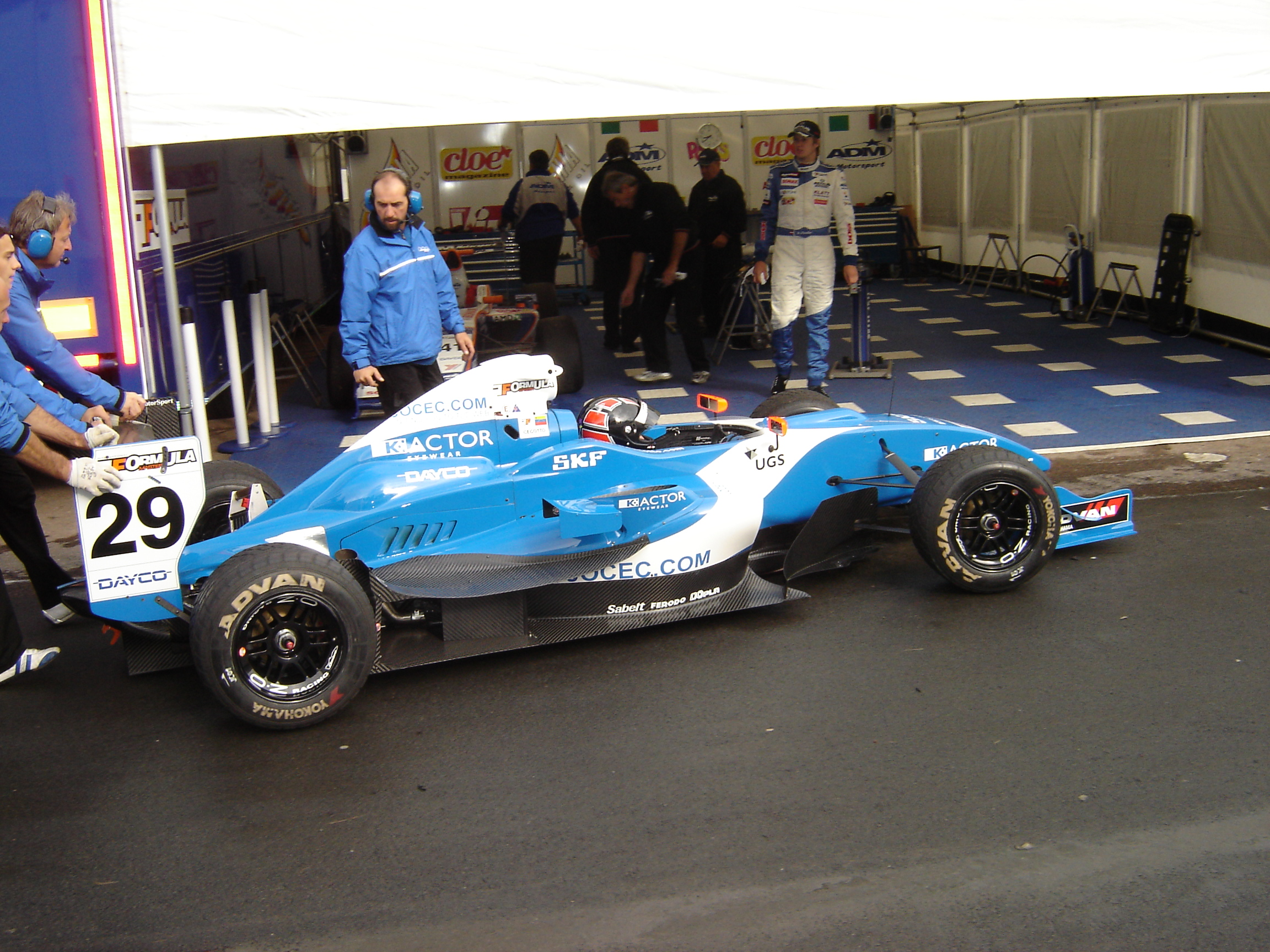
Cecotto driving for Ombra Racing in 2007

Cecotto began his racing career in kart racing, then progressing to open wheel single seater racing. He competed in Formula BMW ADAC in 2005. In 2006, he raced in the German Formula Three Championship, taking one victory, and also in the Formula Renault 2.0 Northern European Cup. In 2007, he raced in the International Formula Master series, finishing eighth with three podiums. He returned to the German F3 Championship, finishing in third with two victories.

In 2009, Cecotto raced in the Formula Three Euroseries for the HBR Motorsport team, before the team missed races at Brands Hatch. He then signed a deal to compete in the GP2 Series, partnering Michael Herck at David Price Racing.

=== GP2 ===
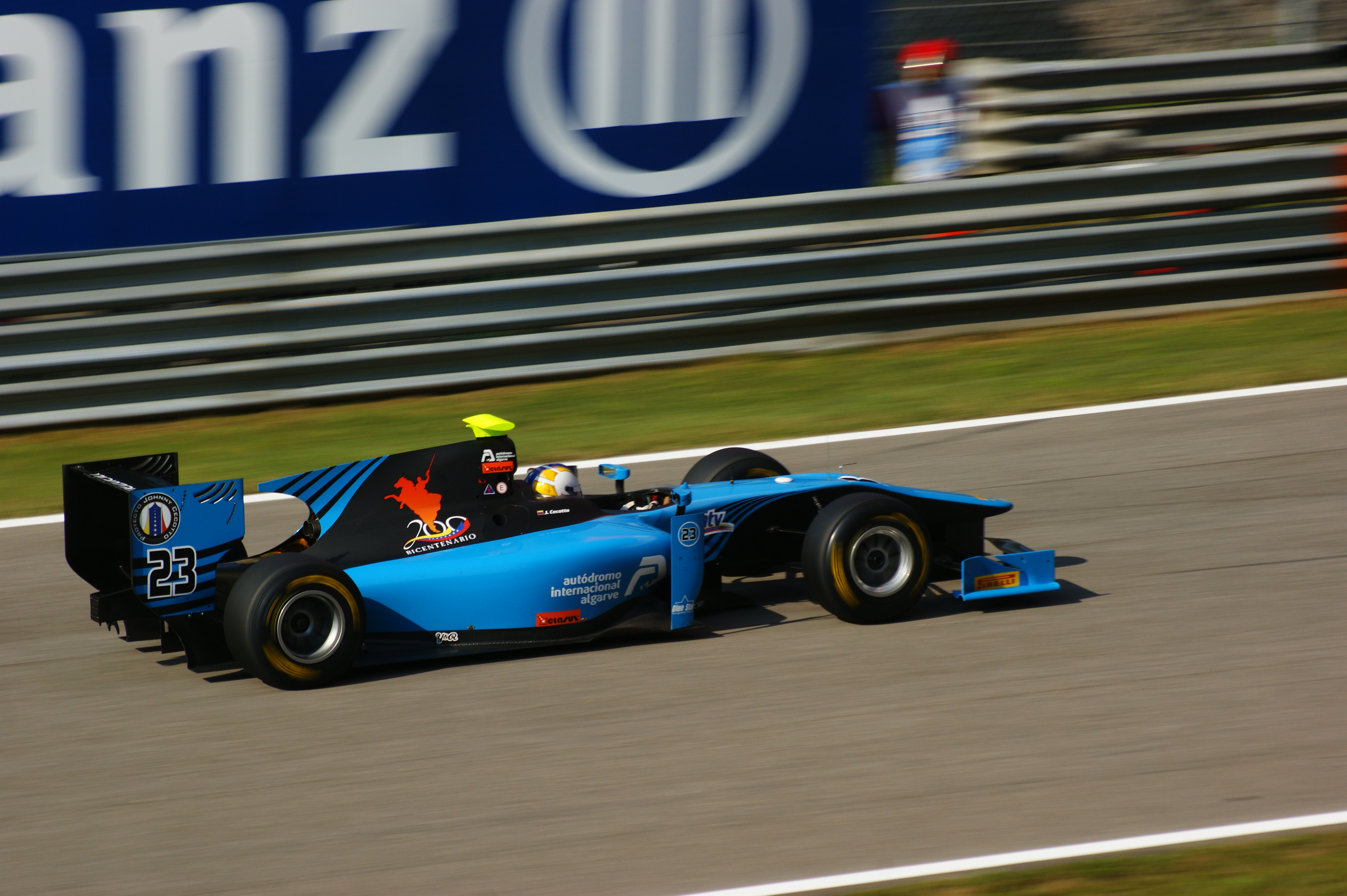
Cecotto driving for Ocean Racing Technology at the Monza round of the 2011 GP2 Series season

Cecotto joined up with Trident Racing for the 2009–10 GP2 Asia Series season, but was replaced by Dani Clos after the first round. He returned to Trident for the 2010 Main Series and scored his first championship points at Monaco, but was replaced by Edoardo Piscopo after sixteen races.

Cecotto moved to Super Nova Racing for the 2011 GP2 Asia Series season alongside Fairuz Fauzy, and finished fifteenth in the drivers' championship. For the main series season, he switched to the Ocean Racing Technology team and was partnered with Kevin Mirocha and later Brendon Hartley, finishing 24th in the championship.

Cecotto switched to the Addax team for the 2012 season, alongside Josef Král. After a difficult start to the season, he suddenly hit form at Monaco, taking his first pole position and race victory in the category. He also won the feature race at Hockenheim after his decision to start with dry tyres on a wet but drying track paid off. Despite also posting seven retirements, the season was comfortably Cecotto's best in the series, finishing ninth in the championship as a result.

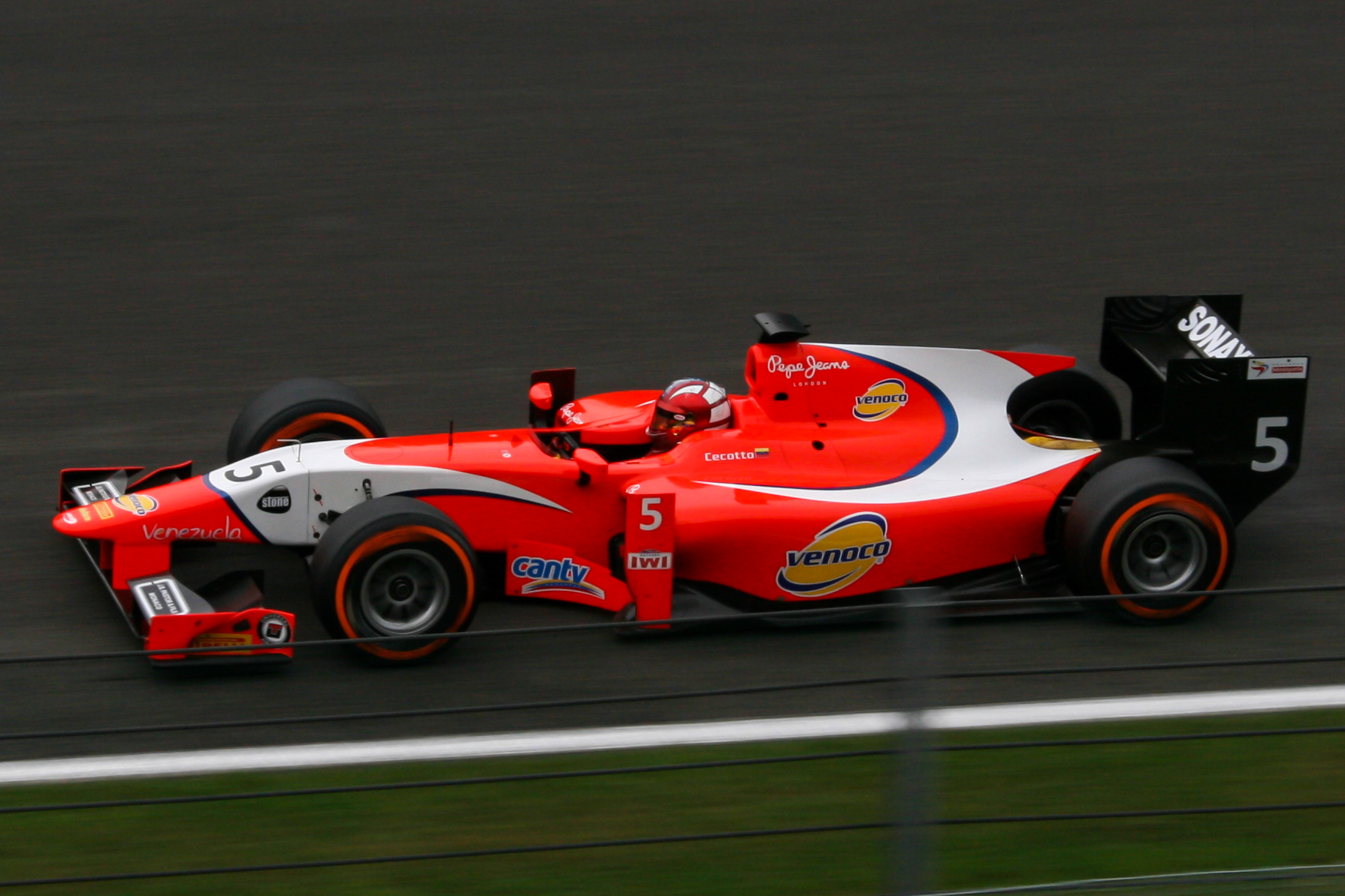
Cecotto driving for Arden International at the Spa round of the 2013 GP2 Series season

In 2013, Cecotto lacked the pace he had shown in the previous year and struggled with no podiums. However, he was once again quick in Monaco, taking pole for the feature race, but he caused a first corner multi-car pile-up leaving him out of the race and banned from the following day's sprint race for causing the collision. Despite this, he had his most consistent GP2 season with ten points finishes ending with 41 points. He returned to Trident for 2014, he scored two victories and three further podium finishes but struggled in the latter stages, he would go on to finish a career-best fifth in the championship.

=== Formula One ===
Cecotto was confirmed as one of the Force India team drivers to participate in the young driver test held in Yas Marina Circuit, after the 2011 Abu Dhabi Grand Prix.

In 2012, Cecotto took part in the young driver test again, this time with Toro Rosso.

=== Formula V8 3.5 Series ===
In 2016, Cecotto moved to the Formula V8 3.5 Series with RP Motorsport. He won his first race of the season at the Hungaroring. However, after the round at Spa-Francorchamps, he split with his team and was left without a ride.

== Racing record ==
=== Career summary ===
Season	Series	Team name	Races	Wins	Poles	F/Laps	Podiums	Points	Position
2005	Formula BMW ADAC	Lauderbach Motorsport	12	0	0	0	0	3	22nd
2005	Formula BMW ADAC	Mamerow Racing	6	0	0	0	0	3	22nd
2005	Formula Junior 1600 Italia	Kiwi ESP	4	0	0	0	1	40	12th
2005	Formula Renault 2.0 Italia Winter Series	Kiwi ESP	4	0	0	1	1	18	7th
2006	German Formula 3 Championship	Ombra Racing	4	1	0	0	1	20	11th
2006	German Formula 3 Championship	Target Racing	4	0	0	0	0	20	11th
2006	Euroseries 3000	Coloni Rookies Team	2	0	0	0	0	2	17th
2006	Italian Formula 3000	Coloni Rookies Team	2	0	0	0	0	2	16th
2006	Formula Renault 2.0 Italia	Kiwi ESP	4	0	0	0	0	0	NC
2006	Formula Renault 2.0 NEC	Koiranen bros. Motorsport	8	0	0	0	1	92	17th
2007	International Formula Master	Ombra Racing	16	0	0	0	3	30	8th
2007	Euroseries 3000	ELK Motorsport	2	0	0	0	0	4	20th
2007	Italian Formula 3000	ELK Motorsport	2	0	0	0	0	4	13th
2007	British Formula 3 Championship	Räikkönen Robertson Racing	0†	0	0	0	0	0†	NC†
2008	German Formula 3 Championship	HS Technik	16	2	3	4	10	99	**3rd**
2009	Formula 3 Euro Series	HBR Motorsport	12	0	0	0	0	0	26th
2009	GP2 Series	DPR	3	0	0	0	0	0	30th
2009–10	GP2 Asia Series	Trident Racing	2	0	0	0	0	3	17th
2010	GP2 Series	Trident Racing	16	0	0	0	0	3	23rd
2011	GP2 Series	Ocean Racing Technology	18	0	0	0	0	0	24th
2011	GP2 Asia Series	Super Nova Racing	4	0	0	0	0	0	15th
2011	Formula One	Force India F1 Team	Test driver						
2012	GP2 Series	Barwa Addax Team	24	2	1	1	4	104	9th
2012	Formula One	Scuderia Toro Rosso	Test driver						
2013	GP2 Series	Arden International	21	0	1	1	0	41	16th
2013	Formula One	Scuderia Toro Rosso	Test driver						
2014	GP2 Series	Trident	22	2	1	0	5	140	5th
2015	Auto GP	Virtuosi UK	2	0	0	0	1	22	8th‡
2015	GP2 Series	Hilmer Motorsport	4	0	0	0	0	0	28th
2015	GP2 Series	Carlin	2	0	0	0	0	0	28th
2015	GP2 Series	Trident	4	0	0	0	0	0	28th
2016	Formula V8 3.5 Series	RP Motorsport	6	1	0	0	1	43	14th
2016	GP2 Series	Rapax	4	0	0	0	1	18	18th
2017	FIA Formula 2 Championship	Rapax	8	0	0	0	1	16	16th

† As Cecotto was a guest driver at Brands Hatch and was thus ineligible for points, but he did not start in both races.
‡ Position when season was cancelled.
* Season still in progress.

=== Complete Formula BMW ADAC results ===
(key) (Races in bold indicate pole position) (Races in italics indicate fastest lap)

Year	Entrant	1	2	3	4	5	6	7	8	9	10	11	12	13	14	15	16	17	18	19	20	DC	Points
2005	Team Lauderbach Motorsport	HOC1; 1; 17	HOC1; 2; 23	LAU; 1 Ret	LAU; 2; 21	SPA; 1; 18	SPA; 2; 15	NÜR1; 1; 21	NÜR1; 2; 22	BRN; 1; 17	BRN; 2; 18	OSC; 1 Ret	OSC; 2; 23									23rd	3
2005	Mamerow Racing													NOR; 1; 9	NOR; 2; 17†	NÜR2; 1; 16	NÜR2; 2; 10	ZAN; 1 Ret	ZAN; 2; 20	HOC2; 1 DNS	HOC2; 2 DNS	23rd	3

=== Complete Formula Renault 2.0 Italia results ===
(key) (Races in bold indicate pole position) (Races in italics indicate fastest lap)

Year	Entrant	1	2	3	4	5	6	7	8	9	10	11	12	13	14	15	DC	Points
2006	Kiwi ESP	MUG; 1 Ret	MUG; 2; 27	VLL; 1; 21	VLL; 2 Ret	IMO; 1	IMO; 2	SPA; 1	SPA; 2	HOC; 1	HOC; 2	MIS; 1	MIS; 2	VAR	MNZ; 1	MNZ; 2	45th	0

=== Complete Formula Renault 2.0 NEC results ===
(key) (Races in bold indicate pole position) (Races in italics indicate fastest lap)

Year	Entrant	1	2	3	4	5	6	7	8	9	10	11	12	13	14	15	16	DC	Points
2006	Koiranen bros. Motorsport	OSC; 1	OSC; 2	SPA; 1; 4	SPA; 2; 3	NÜR; 1; 6	NÜR; 2; 8	ZAN; 1; 8	ZAN; 2 Ret	OSC; 1; 7	OSC; 2 Ret	ASS; 1	ASS; 2	AND; 1	AND; 2	SAL; 1	SAL; 2	17th	92

=== Complete ATS Formel 3 Cup results ===
(key) (Races in bold indicate pole position; races in italics indicate fastest lap)

Year	Entrant	Chassis	Engine	1	2	3	4	5	6	7	8	9	10	11	12	13	14	15	16	17	18	19	20	DC	Points
2006	Ombra Racing	Dallara F305	Mugen-Honda	OSC1; 1	OSC1; 2	HOC; 1	HOC; 2	LAU1; 1	LAU1; 2	NÜR1; 1	NÜR1; 2	NÜR2; 1; 19	NÜR2; 2 Ret	ASS1; 1; 1	ASS1; 2; 4	LAU2; 1	LAU2; 2							11th	20
2006	Target Racing	SLC R1/F3002	Opel															ASS2; 1 Ret	ASS2; 2; 8	SAL; 1; 5	SAL; 2 Ret	OSC1; 1	OSC1; 2	11th	20
2008	HS Technik Motorsport	Dallara F306	Mercedes HWA	HOC; 1	HOC; 2	OSC1; 1; 7	OSC1; 2; 1	NÜR1; 1; 3	NÜR1; 2; 6	HOC; 1; 2	HOC; 2; 5	**ASS**; **1**; 1	**ASS**; **2**; 2	NÜR2; 1; 10	NÜR2; 2; 4	LAU; 1; 10	LAU; 2; 3	SAC; 1; 3	SAC; 2; 2	OSC2; 1; 2	**OSC2**; **2**; 2			3rd	99

=== Complete Euroseries 3000 results ===
(key) (Races in bold indicate pole position; races in italics indicate fastest lap)

Year	Entrant	1	2	3	4	5	6	7	8	9	10	11	12	13	14	15	16	17	18	DC	Points
2006	Coloni Rookies Team	ADR; 1	ADR; 2	IMO; 1	IMO; 2	SPA; 1	SPA; 2	HUN; 1	HUN; 2	MUG; 1	MUG; 2	SIL; 1	SIL; 2	CAT; 1; 11	CAT; 2; 5	VLL; 1	VLL; 2	MIS; 1	MIS; 2	17th	2
2007	ELK Motorsport	VLL; 1	VLL; 2	HUN; 1	HUN; 2	MAG; 1	MAG; 2	MUG; 1	MUG; 2	NÜR; 1	NÜR; 2	SPA; 1	SPA; 2	MNZ; 1 Ret	MNZ; 2; 3	CAT; 1	CAT; 2			20th	4

=== Complete International Formula Master results ===
(key) (Races in bold indicate pole position; races in italics indicate fastest lap)

Year	Entrant	1	2	3	4	5	6	7	8	9	10	11	12	13	14	15	16	DC	Points
2007	Ombra Racing	VAL; 1; 3	VAL; 2; 5	PAU; 1; 10	PAU; 2; 10	BRN; 1; 9	BRN; 2; 18	BOA; 1; 4	BOA; 2 Ret	AND; 1 Ret	AND; 2; 3	OSC; 1; 13	OSC; 2; 10	BRH; 1; 8	**BRH**; **2**; 2	MNZ; 1 Ret	MNZ; 2; 9	8th	30

=== Complete Formula 3 Euro Series results ===
(key) (Races in bold indicate pole position; races in italics indicate fastest lap)

Year	Entrant	Chassis	Engine	1	2	3	4	5	6	7	8	9	10	11	12	13	14	15	16	17	18	19	20	DC	Points
2009	HBR Motorsport	Dallara F308/052	Mercedes	HOC; 1; 21	HOC; 2 Ret	LAU; 1; 16	LAU; 2 Ret	NOR; 1; 17	NOR; 2 Ret	ZAN; 1; 15	ZAN; 2; 20	OSC; 1; 17	OSC; 2; 19	NÜR; 1; 16	NÜR; 2; 11	BRH; 1	BRH; 2	CAT; 1	CAT; 2	DIJ; 1	DIJ; 2	HOC; 1	HOC; 2	26th	0

=== Complete GP2 Series/FIA Formula 2 Championship results ===
(key) (Races in bold indicate pole position) (Races in italics indicate fastest lap)

Year	Entrant	1	2	3	4	5	6	7	8	9	10	11	12	13	14	15	16	17	18	19	20	21	22	23	24	DC	Points
2009	DPR	CAT; FEA	CAT; SPR	MON; FEA	MON; SPR	IST; FEA	IST; SPR	SIL; FEA	SIL; SPR	NÜR; FEA	NÜR; SPR	HUN; FEA	HUN; SPR	VAL; FEA	VAL; SPR	SPA; FEA	SPA; SPR	MNZ; FEA; 18†	MNZ; SPR; 16†	ALG; FEA; DNS	ALG; SPR; 18					30th	0
2010	Trident Racing	CAT; FEA; Ret	CAT; SPR; 17	MON; FEA; 9	MON; SPR; 4	IST; FEA; 12	IST; SPR; 12	VAL; FEA; Ret	VAL; SPR; 14	SIL; FEA; 18	SIL; SPR; 23	HOC; FEA; 13	HOC; SPR; Ret	HUN; FEA; Ret	HUN; SPR; 13	SPA; FEA; 10	SPA; SPR; Ret	MNZ; FEA	MNZ; SPR	YMC; FEA	YMC; SPR					23rd	3
2011	Ocean Racing Technology	IST; FEA; Ret	IST; SPR; 13	CAT; FEA; 14	CAT; SPR; 13	MON; FEA; Ret	MON; SPR; 17	VAL; FEA; 14	VAL; SPR; 17	SIL; FEA; 12	SIL; SPR; Ret	NÜR; FEA; 10	NÜR; SPR; Ret	HUN; FEA; Ret	HUN; SPR; Ret	SPA; FEA; 11	SPA; SPR; 8	MNZ; FEA; 17	MNZ; SPR; 15							24th	0
2012	Barwa Addax Team	SEP; FEA; Ret	SEP; SPR; 22	BHR1; FEA; Ret	BHR1; SPR; 22†	BHR2; FEA; 9	BHR2; SPR; Ret	CAT; FEA; 18	CAT; SPR; 13	**MON**; **FEA**; 1	MON; SPR; Ret	VAL; FEA; DSQ	VAL; SPR; Ret	SIL; FEA; 2	SIL; SPR; 18†	HOC; FEA; 1	HOC; SPR; 6	HUN; FEA; Ret	HUN; SPR; Ret	SPA; FEA; 17	SPA; SPR; Ret	MNZ; FEA; 2	MNZ; SPR; 5	MRN; FEA; Ret	MRN; SPR; 9	9th	104
2013	Arden International	SEP; FEA; 12	SEP; SPR; 5	BHR; FEA; 10	BHR; SPR; 12	CAT; FEA; 8	CAT; SPR; 5	**MON**; **FEA**; Ret	MON; SPR; EX	SIL; FEA; 17	SIL; SPR; Ret	NÜR; FEA; 10	NÜR; SPR; 5	HUN; FEA; 21	HUN; SPR; Ret	SPA; FEA; 14	SPA; SPR; 7	MNZ; FEA; 12	MNZ; SPR; 8	MRN; FEA; 14	MRN; SPR; 6	YMC; FEA; 8	YMC; SPR; Ret			16th	41
2014	Trident	BHR; FEA; 21	BHR; SPR; 14	CAT; FEA; 1	CAT; SPR; 6	MON; FEA; 4	MON; SPR; 4	**RBR**; **FEA**; 6	RBR; SPR; 1	SIL; FEA; 6	SIL; SPR; 3	HOC; FEA; 7	HOC; SPR; Ret	HUN; FEA; Ret	HUN; SPR; Ret	SPA; FEA; 3	SPA; SPR; 2	MNZ; FEA; 10	MNZ; SPR; Ret	SOC; FEA; 19	SOC; SPR; 23†	YMC; FEA; 6	YMC; SPR; 6			5th	140
2015	Hilmer Motorsport	BHR; FEA	BHR; SPR	CAT; FEA; 21	CAT; SPR; Ret	MON; FEA; 20	MON; SPR; Ret	RBR; FEA	RBR; SPR																	28th	0
2015	Carlin									SIL; FEA; 13	SIL; SPR; 25	HUN; FEA	HUN; SPR	SPA; FEA	SPA; SPR											28th	0
2015	Trident															MNZ; FEA; 18	MNZ; SPR; 13	SOC; FEA; 13	SOC; SPR; 22†	BHR; FEA	BHR; SPR	YMC; FEA	YMC; SPR			28th	0
2016	Rapax	CAT; FEA	CAT; SPR	MON; FEA	MON; SPR	BAK; FEA	BAK; SPR	RBR; FEA	RBR; SPR	SIL; FEA	SIL; SPR	HUN; FEA	HUN; SPR	HOC; FEA	HOC; SPR	SPA; FEA	SPA; SPR	MNZ; FEA	MNZ; SPR	SEP; FEA; 13	SEP; SPR; 9	YMC; FEA; 7	YMC; SPR; 2			18th	18
2017	Rapax	BHR; FEA; 15	BHR; SPR; 9	CAT; FEA; 17	CAT; SPR; 10	MON; FEA; 8	MON; SPR; 2	BAK; FEA; Ret	BAK; SPR; 14	RBR; FEA	RBR; SPR	SIL; FEA	SIL; SPR	HUN; FEA	HUN; SPR	SPA; FEA	SPA; SPR	MNZ; FEA	MNZ; SPR	JER; FEA	JER; SPR	YMC; FEA	YMC; SPR			16th	16

^{†} Driver did not finish, but was classified as he completed over 90% of the race distance.

==== Complete GP2 Asia Series results ====
(key) (Races in bold indicate pole position) (Races in italics indicate fastest lap)

Year	Entrant	1	2	3	4	5	6	7	8	DC	Points
2009–10	Trident Racing	YMC1; FEA; 7	YMC1; SPR; 6	YMC2; FEA	YMC2; SPR	BHR1; FEA	BHR1; SPR	BHR2; FEA	BHR2; SPR	17th	3
2011	Super Nova Racing	YMC; FEA; 15	YMC; SPR; 7	IMO; FEA; 16	IMO; SPR; 19					15th	0

=== Complete Auto GP results ===
(key) (Races in bold indicate pole position) (Races in italics indicate fastest lap)

Year	Entrant	1	2	3	4	Pos	Points
2015	Virtuosi UK	HUN; 1; 5	HUN; 2; 3	SIL; 1	SIL; 2	8th‡	22‡

^{‡} Position when season was cancelled.

=== Complete Formula V8 3.5 results ===
(key) (Races in bold indicate pole position) (Races in italics indicate fastest lap)

Year	Team	1	2	3	4	5	6	7	8	9	10	11	12	13	14	15	16	17	18	Pos.	Points
2016	RP Motorsport	ALC; 1; 9	ALC; 2; 6	HUN; 1; 1	HUN; 2; 6	SPA; 1; 12†	SPA; 2 Ret	LEC; 1	LEC; 2	SIL; 1	SIL; 2	RBR; 1	RBR; 2	MNZ; 1	MNZ; 2	JER; 1	JER; 2	CAT; 1	CAT; 2	14th	42

^{†} Driver did not finish, but was classified as he completed over 90% of the race distance.
