= Ombra Racing =

Italian auto racing team

(Italy) Ombra Racing
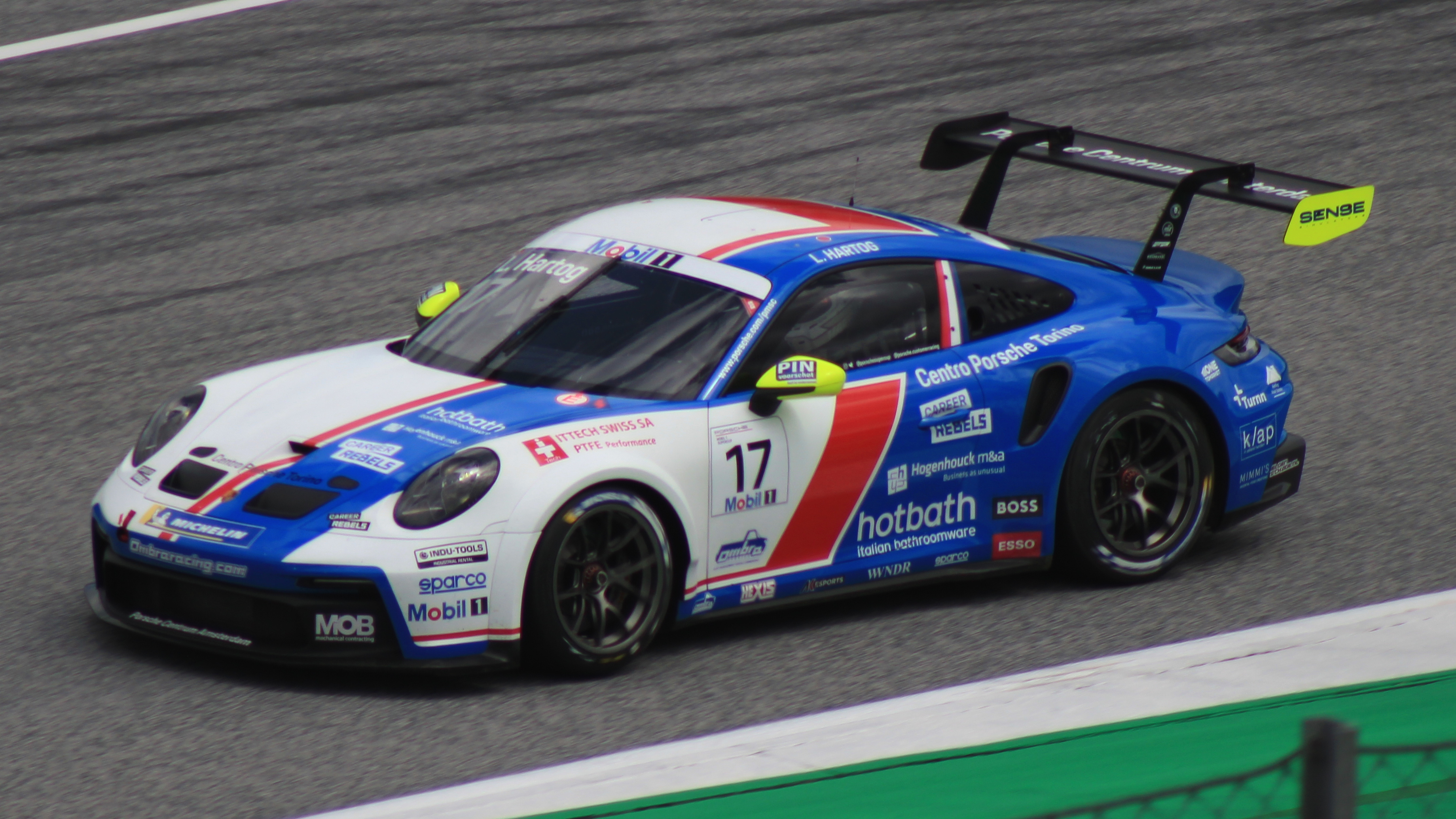
- Founded: 1994
- Base: Chignolo d'Isola
- Team principal(s): Gianfranco Colleoni
- Current series: Porsche Supercup; Porsche Carrera Cup Italy
- Former series: International Formula Master; Formula 3 Euro Series; Italian Formula Three Championship; British Formula 3 Championship; German Formula Three Championship; Auto GP; International GT Open
- Teams' Championships: 2004 Italian Formula Three
- Drivers' Championships: 2004 Italian Formula Three season (Cressoni); 2011 Auto GP season (Ceccon)

Ombra Racing is an auto racing team based in Italy currently competing in the Porsche Supercup. Ombra Racing was established in 1994 by the team founders Gianfranco Colleoni and Matteo Quadri and first entered the Italian Formula Junior (Trofeo Cadetti) from 1994 to 1999.

== History ==
In 2000, Ombra stepped up to the Italian Formula 3, where it won both the drivers' as well as the teams' championship titles with Matteo Cressoni in 2004. It remained a full-time regular in the series until 2008. From 2006 to 2008, Ombra additionally made season campaigns in the German Formula 3 (ATS Formula 3 Cup). The team also made wildcard starts in the 2005 Formula 3 Euro Series and 2008 British Formula Three Championship.

They ventured in more powerful open wheeler categories when they ran a part-time schedule in the 2005 3000 Pro Series, and a complete season in the 2007 International Formula Master with Johnny Cecotto Jr. scoring three podiums. This was followed by entries in the Auto GP Series from 2010 to 2012 where Kevin Ceccon took the Drivers' Championship title while on the team in 2011.

Following 2012 they made the switch from open wheeler Formula style racing to Grand Touring racing. They focused on the International GT Open (IGTO)) and their domestic Italian GT Championship (CIGT). The duo of Alex Frassinetti and Michele Beretta won the Super GT3 PRO Category for both the Drivers' and Teams' Championship and the Manufacturers' title for Lamborghini in 2017.

The Team stepped up to the top class of GT3 in 2016 with their participation in the Blancpain Endurance Series (BES) with a highlight class win in the Silver Cup of the 2018 24 Hours of Spa. Following the 2019 season, they moved from Lamborghini to the Porsche Carrera Cup.

Since 2020 the team runs in the Porsche Carrera Cup Italia and Porsche Supercup. Simone Iaquinta took the Italian Porsche Carrera Cup Drivers' title in 2019 and 2020 for the Team.

== Current series results ==
=== Porsche Supercup ===
Porsche Supercup
Year	Car	Drivers	Races	Wins	Poles	F/Laps	Points	D.C.	T.C.
2020	Porsche 911 GT3 Cup (Type 991 II)	(Italy) Simone Iaquinta	1	0	0	0	0	NC†	NC
2020	Porsche 911 GT3 Cup (Type 991 II)	(Italy) Stefano Gattuso	1	0	0	0	0	NC†	NC
2022	Porsche 911 GT3 Cup (Type 992)	(Netherlands) Loek Hartog	8	0	0	0	43	8th	7th
2022	Porsche 911 GT3 Cup (Type 992)	(Italy) Gianmarco Quaresmini	8	0	0	0	14	17th	7th
2022	Porsche 911 GT3 Cup (Type 992)	(Italy) Leonardo Caglioni	3	0	0	0	0	NC†	7th
2023	Porsche 911 GT3 Cup (Type 992)	(South Africa) Keagan Masters	8	0	0	0	45	10th	5th
2023	Porsche 911 GT3 Cup (Type 992)	(Italy) Riccardo Pera	2	0	0	0	8	21st	5th
2023	Porsche 911 GT3 Cup (Type 992)	(North Macedonia) Risto Vukov	8	0	0	0	4	22nd	5th
2023	Porsche 911 GT3 Cup (Type 992)	(France) Marvin Klein	6	0	0	0	0	NC†	5th
2023	Porsche 911 GT3 Cup (Type 992)	(Italy) Alberto Cerqui	1	0	0	0	0	NC†	5th
2024	Porsche 911 GT3 Cup (Type 992)	(South Africa) Keagan Masters	8	0	0	0	88	4th	4th
2024	Porsche 911 GT3 Cup (Type 992)	(Germany) Lirim Zendeli	8	0	0	0	36	12th	4th
2024	Porsche 911 GT3 Cup (Type 992)	(North Macedonia) Risto Vukov	6	0	0	0	8	20th	4th
2024	Porsche 911 GT3 Cup (Type 992)	(Netherlands) Dirk Schouten	2	0	0	0	0	NC†	4th
2024	Porsche 911 GT3 Cup (Type 992)	(United States) Anthony Imperato	1	0	0	0	0	NC†	4th
2025	Porsche 911 GT3 Cup (Type 992)	(South Africa) Keagan Masters	8	0	0	0	38	12th	7th
2025	Porsche 911 GT3 Cup (Type 992)	(Italy) Francesco Braschi	8	0	0	1	13	18th	7th
2025	Porsche 911 GT3 Cup (Type 992)	(United States) Anthony Imperato	3	0	0	0	1.5	23rd	7th
2025	Porsche 911 GT3 Cup (Type 992)	(Argentina) Luciano Martínez	5	0	0	0	0	NC†	7th
2026	Porsche 911 GT3 Cup (Type 992.2)	(United Kingdom) Liam McNeilly							
2026	Porsche 911 GT3 Cup (Type 992.2)	(Argentina) Luciano Martínez							
2026	Porsche 911 GT3 Cup (Type 992.2)	(Romania) Filip Ugran							
2026	Porsche 911 GT3 Cup (Type 992.2)	(United States) Henry Wheeler							

† Guest drivers, which were ineligible to score points.

== Former series results ==
=== Italian Formula 3 ===
Italian Formula Three Championship
Year	Car	Drivers	Races	Wins	Poles	F/Laps	Points	D.C.
2004	Dallara F304-Mugen-Honda	(Italy) Matteo Cressoni	14	2	0	0	146	1st
2004	Dallara F304-Mugen-Honda	(Italy) Davide Mazzoleni	5	0	0	0	33	10th
2005	Dallara F304-Mugen-Honda	(Lebanon) Basil Shaaban	1	0	0	0	2	17th
2005	Dallara F304-Mugen-Honda	(Italy) Giuseppe Termine	2	0	0	0	16	11th
2005	Dallara F304-Mugen-Honda	(Lebanon) Khalil Beschir	1	0	0	0	0	19th
2010	Dallara F308-FPT	(Italy) Giacomo Barri	16	0	0	0	8	17th
2010	Dallara F308-FPT	(Italy) Alberto Cerqui	16	0	0	0	3	19th

=== 3000 Pro Series/International Formula Master ===
3000 Pro Series
Year	Drivers	Races	Wins	Poles	F/Laps	Points	D.C.	T.C.
2005	(Lebanon) Khalil Beschir	5	0	0	0	4	13th	8th
2005	(Lebanon) Basil Shaaban	5	0	0	0	0	19th	8th
International Formula Master
2007	(Venezuela) Johnny Cecotto Jr.	16	0	1	0	30	8th	7th
2007	(Netherlands) Dominick Muermans	16	0	0	0	1	28th	7th

=== German Formula 3 ===
German Formula Three Championship
Year	Car	Drivers	Races	Wins	Poles	F/Laps	Points	D.C.
2006	Dallara F306-Mugen-Honda	(Italy) Mattia Pavoni	19	0	0	0	0	28th
2006	Dallara F305-Mugen-Honda	(Italy) Marika Diana	8	0	0	0	0	37th†
2006	Dallara F305-Mugen-Honda	(Venezuela) Johnny Cecotto Jr.	4	1	0	0	20	11th†
2006	Dallara F305-Mugen-Honda	(Italy) Massimo Rossi	6	0	0	0	0	41st
2007	Dallara F305-Mugen-Honda	(Italy) Matteo Chinosi	18	0	0	0	77	6th
2007	Dallara F306-Mugen-Honda	(Italy) Federico Glorioso	15	0	0	0	9	12th
2007	Dallara F302-Mugen-Honda	(Italy) Marika Diana [T]	12	0	0	0	53	5th [T]
2008	Dallara F305-Mugen-Honda	(Italy) Matteo Chinosi	16	2	2	0	73	5th
2008	Dallara F305-Mugen-Honda	(Austria) Philipp Eng	2	0	0	0	18	11th†
2008	Dallara F306-Mugen-Honda	(Italy) Federico Leo	18	0	0	0	23	9th
2008	Dallara F302-Mugen-Honda	(Italy) Massimo Rossi [T]	8	0	0	0	44	6th [T]

† Shared results with other teams

=== Auto GP ===
Auto GP Series
Year	Drivers	Races	Wins	Poles	F/Laps	Points	D.C.	T.C.
2010	(Italy) Giorgio Pantano	2	0	0	0	8	13th	9th†
2011	(Italy) Kevin Ceccon	14	1	0	3	130	1st	5th
2011	(Italy) Francesco Dracone	8	0	0	0	1	21st†	5th
2011	(Italy) Pasquale Di Sabatino	2	0	0	0	38	12th†	5th
2011	(Italy) Stefano Bizzarri	2	0	0	0	0	22nd	5th
2011	(Italy) Michele la Rosa	2	0	0	0	0	23rd	5th
2012	(China) Adderly Fong	4	0	0	0	3	21st	6th
2012	(Brazil) Yann Cunha	4	0	0	0	8	18th	6th
2012	(Brazil) Antônio Pizzonia	2	2	0	0	45	9th†	6th
2012	(Italy) Antonio Spavone	2	0	0	0	41	10th†	6th
2012	(Venezuela) Giancarlo Serenelli	12	0	0	0	34	12th	6th
2012	(Brazil) Rafael Suzuki	2	0	0	0	12	17th	6th

† Shared results with other teams
