= 2008 German Formula Three Championship =

Seasons
- ← 2007 2009 →

The 2008 ATS F3 Cup was the sixth edition of the German F3 Cup. It commenced on 24 May 2008 and ended on 12 October after eighteen rounds. The title was won by Frédéric Vervisch.

== Teams and drivers ==
- Guest drivers in italics.

Team	Chassis	Engine	No.	Driver	Status	Rounds
Cup Class
(Netherlands) Van Amersfoort Racing	Dallara F305/046	Volkswagen	1	(Switzerland) Rahel Frey	R	1–8
(Netherlands) Van Amersfoort Racing	Dallara F305/046	Volkswagen	1	(Republic of Ireland) Niall Quinn		9
(Netherlands) Van Amersfoort Racing	Dallara F306/023	Volkswagen	2	(Belgium) Laurens Vanthoor	R	All
(Italy) Ombra Racing	Dallara F305/064	Mugen-Honda	9	(Italy) Matteo Chinosi		1–8
(Italy) Ombra Racing	Dallara F305/064	Mugen-Honda	9	(Austria) Philipp Eng		9
(Italy) Ombra Racing	Dallara F306/007	Mugen-Honda	10	(Italy) Federico Leo	R	All
(Austria) Neuhauser Racing	Dallara F305/045	Mercedes HWA	11	(Austria) Gerhard Tweraser		All
(Austria) HS Technik Motorsport	Dallara F305/039	Mercedes HWA	12	(Colombia) Sebastián Saavedra	R	All
(Austria) HS Technik Motorsport	Dallara F306/025	Mercedes HWA	14	(Austria) Philipp Eng	R	1
(Austria) HS Technik Motorsport	Dallara F306/025	Mercedes HWA	14	(Venezuela) Johnny Cecotto Jr.		2–9
(Switzerland) Swiss Racing Team	Dallara F306/034	Mercedes HWA	15	(Latvia) Karline Stala	R	7–9
(Switzerland) Swiss Racing Team	Dallara F305/034	OPC-Challenge	16	(Sweden) Max Nilsson		All
(Switzerland) Swiss Racing Team	Dallara F305/004	OPC-Challenge	17	(Belgium) Frédéric Vervisch		1–5
(Switzerland) Swiss Racing Team	Dallara F305/004	OPC-Challenge	17	(Finland) Tomi Limmonen		9
(Germany) Team rhino’s Leipert	Dallara F305/063	OPC-Challenge	19	(Italy) Federico Glorioso		1–6, 9
(Germany) Team rhino’s Leipert	Dallara F305/040	OPC-Challenge	20	(Ukraine) Sergey Chukanov	R	All
(Luxembourg) Racing Experience	Dallara F306/009	Mercedes HWA	24	(Latvia) Karline Stala	R	1–4
(Luxembourg) Racing Experience	Mygale M-07/00	Opel	24	(Luxembourg) Louis Wagner		6
(Luxembourg) Racing Experience	Dallara F306/010	Mercedes HWA	25	(Luxembourg) David Hauser	R	All
(Luxembourg) Racing Experience	Dallara F305/012	Mercedes HWA	26	(Luxembourg) Gary Hauser	R	All
(Sweden) Performance Racing	Dallara F305/041	OPC-Challenge	28	(Brazil) Rafael Suzuki		All
(Sweden) Performance Racing	Dallara F305/051	OPC-Challenge	29	(Hong Kong) Adderly Fong	R	1, 5–9
(Sweden) Performance Racing	Dallara F305/051	OPC-Challenge	29	(Indonesia) Satrio Hermanto		4
(Switzerland) Jo Zeller Racing	Dallara F306/014	Mercedes HWA	30	(Belgium) Frédéric Vervisch		6–8
(Switzerland) Jo Zeller Racing	Dallara F306/014	Mercedes HWA	30	(Germany) Kevin Mirocha		9
(Austria) Franz Wöss Racing	Dallara F305/028	Mercedes HWA	38	(Bahrain) Hamad Al Fardan		1–6
(Germany) GU-Racing Team	Dallara F306/030	Mercedes HWA	40	(Germany) Jens Höing		1–4, 7–9
(Germany) Josef Kaufmann Racing	Dallara F305/027	OPC-Challenge	44	(Germany) Kevin Mirocha		1–8
(Germany) Josef Kaufmann Racing	Dallara F305/027	OPC-Challenge	44	(Mexico) Esteban Gutiérrez	R	9
Trophy Class
(Austria) HS Technik Motorsport	Dallara F303/026	OPC-Challenge	50	(Netherlands) Shirley van der Lof		All
(Germany) Team rhino’s Leipert	Dallara F302/060	Renault	52	(Italy) Luca Iannaccone		All
(Germany) Team rhino’s Leipert	Dallara F304/012	Opel	53	(Italy) Giulio Glorioso	R	All
(Czech Republic) KFR Team F3	Dallara F302/044	OPC-Challenge	55	(Netherlands) Dennis Swart	R	All
(Italy) Ombra Racing	Dallara F302/075	Mugen-Honda	59	(Italy) Massimo Rossi		1–4
(Germany) JMS Jenichen	Dallara F302/084	Opel	60	(Germany) Marcel Schlenker	R	1–4
(Austria) Franz Wöss Racing	Dallara F303/007	Opel	62	(Austria) Bernd Herndlhofer	R	All
(Austria) Franz Wöss Racing	Dallara F302/033	Opel	63	(Germany) Francesco Lopez		7–9
(Germany) Auto-Häckel-Motorsport	Dallara F302/033	Opel	64	(Austria) Klaus-Dieter Häckel		1–4
(Austria) Neuhauser Racing	Dallara F303/022	Opel	66	(Austria) Marco Oberhauser		All
(France) Griffith's	Dallara F304/004	Opel	71	(France) David Moretti		1

== Calendar ==
With the exception of round at TT Circuit Assen, all rounds took place on German soil.

Round		Circuit	Date	Pole position	Fastest lap	Winning driver	Winning team	Trophy winner	Supporting
1	R1	Hockenheim	26 April	(Colombia) Sebastián Saavedra	(Colombia) Sebastián Saavedra	(Italy) Matteo Chinosi	(Italy) Ombra Racing	(Austria) Bernd Herndlhofer	Jim Clark Revival
1	R2	Hockenheim	27 April	(Austria) Philipp Eng	(Austria) Philipp Eng	(Austria) Gerhard Tweraser	(Austria) Neuhauser Racing	(Austria) Bernd Herndlhofer	Jim Clark Revival
2	R1	Oschersleben	10 May	(Colombia) Sebastián Saavedra	(Austria) Gerhard Tweraser	(Austria) Gerhard Tweraser	(Austria) Neuhauser Racing	(Austria) Marco Oberhauser	ADAC GT Masters
2	R2	Oschersleben	11 May	(Colombia) Sebastián Saavedra	(Colombia) Sebastián Saavedra	(Venezuela) Johnny Cecotto Jr.	(Austria) HS Technik Motorsport	(Netherlands) Dennis Swart	ADAC GT Masters
3	R1	Nürburgring	23 May	(Italy) Matteo Chinosi	(Venezuela) Johnny Cecotto Jr.	(Belgium) Frédéric Vervisch	(Switzerland) Swiss Racing Team	(Austria) Marco Oberhauser	24 Hours Nürburgring
3	R2	Nürburgring	24 May	(Italy) Matteo Chinosi	(Austria) Gerhard Tweraser	(Italy) Matteo Chinosi	(Italy) Ombra Racing	(Austria) Marco Oberhauser	24 Hours Nürburgring
4	R1	Hockenheim	14 June	(Belgium) Laurens Vanthoor	(Venezuela) Johnny Cecotto Jr.	(Colombia) Sebastián Saavedra	(Austria) HS Technik Motorsport	(Netherlands) Dennis Swart	ADAC GT Masters
4	R2	Hockenheim	15 June	(Brazil) Rafael Suzuki	(Switzerland) Rahel Frey	(Belgium) Frédéric Vervisch	(Switzerland) Swiss Racing Team	(Netherlands) Dennis Swart	ADAC GT Masters
5	R1	Assen	2 August	(Venezuela) Johnny Cecotto Jr.	(Belgium) Frédéric Vervisch	(Venezuela) Johnny Cecotto Jr.	(Austria) HS Technik Motorsport	(Austria) Bernd Herndlhofer	Rizla+ Race Day
5	R2	Assen	3 August	(Venezuela) Johnny Cecotto Jr.	(Venezuela) Johnny Cecotto Jr.	(Colombia) Sebastián Saavedra	(Austria) HS Technik Motorsport	(Netherlands) Dennis Swart	Rizla+ Race Day
6	R1	Nürburgring	16 August	(Belgium) Frédéric Vervisch	(Belgium) Frédéric Vervisch	(Belgium) Frédéric Vervisch	(Switzerland) Jo Zeller Racing	(Austria) Marco Oberhauser	1000 km Nürburgring
6	R2	Nürburgring	17 August	(Belgium) Frédéric Vervisch	(Belgium) Frédéric Vervisch	(Belgium) Frédéric Vervisch	(Switzerland) Jo Zeller Racing	(Netherlands) Shirley van der Lof	1000 km Nürburgring
7	R1	EuroSpeedway	6 September	(Belgium) Frédéric Vervisch	(Belgium) Frédéric Vervisch	(Belgium) Frédéric Vervisch	(Switzerland) Jo Zeller Racing	(Netherlands) Dennis Swart	ADAC GT Masters
7	R2	EuroSpeedway	7 September	(Colombia) Sebastián Saavedra	(Belgium) Frédéric Vervisch	(Belgium) Frédéric Vervisch	(Switzerland) Jo Zeller Racing	(Netherlands) Shirley van der Lof	ADAC GT Masters
8	R1	Sachsenring	20 September	(Belgium) Laurens Vanthoor	(Belgium) Frédéric Vervisch	(Belgium) Frédéric Vervisch	(Switzerland) Jo Zeller Racing	(Netherlands) Dennis Swart	ADAC GT Masters
8	R2	Sachsenring	21 September	(Belgium) Frédéric Vervisch	(Venezuela) Johnny Cecotto Jr.	(Belgium) Laurens Vanthoor	(Netherlands) van Amersfoort Racing	(Austria) Marco Oberhauser	ADAC GT Masters
9	R1	Oschersleben	11 October	(Belgium) Laurens Vanthoor	(Belgium) Laurens Vanthoor	(Colombia) Sebastián Saavedra	(Austria) HS Technik Motorsport	(Austria) Marco Oberhauser	ADAC Master Weekend
9	R2	Oschersleben	12 October	(Venezuela) Johnny Cecotto Jr.	(Belgium) Laurens Vanthoor	(Belgium) Laurens Vanthoor	(Netherlands) van Amersfoort Racing	(Netherlands) Shirley van der Lof	ADAC Master Weekend

== Standings ==
=== ATS Formel 3 Cup ===
- Points are awarded as follows:

1	2	3	4	5	6	7	8	PP	FL
10	8	6	5	4	3	2	1	**1**	1

Pos	Driver	HOC1		OSC1		NÜR1		HOC2		ASS		NÜR2		LAU		SAC		OSC2		Pts
1	(Belgium) Frédéric Vervisch	3	25†	5	2	1	3	4	1	5	7	**1**	**1**	**1**	1	1	**4**			120
2	(Colombia) Sebastián Saavedra	**2**	24†	**3**	**22**†	4	4	1	11	4	1	Ret	5	4	**2**	4	3	1	3	99
3	(Venezuela) Johnny Cecotto Jr.			7	1	3	6	2	5	**1**	**2**	10	4	10	3	3	2	2	**2**	99
4	(Belgium) Laurens Vanthoor	12	Ret	2	8	Ret	2	**Ret**	7	6	3	2	2	2	11	**2**	1	**18**†	1	85
5	(Italy) Matteo Chinosi	1	2	22	3	**2**	**1**	6	3	7	5	7	10	3	7	5	20			73
6	(Germany) Kevin Mirocha	8	Ret	4	6	13	12	3	2	2	4	3	6	6	8	Ret	5	6	14	56
7	(Brazil) Rafael Suzuki	4	5	9	4	10	14	5	**8**	3	6	5	3	7	5	6	6	Ret	5	55
8	(Austria) Gerhard Tweraser	11	1	1	Ret	Ret	5	9	6	11	8	8	7	5	4	7	7	4	6	54
9	(Italy) Federico Leo	6	3	8	5	7	7	8	23	9	Ret	6	Ret	9	10	Ret	11	20†	9	23
10	(Sweden) Max Nilsson	Ret	6	11	Ret	6	13	13	12	22†	10	4	8	DNS	6	8	14	5	Ret	20
11	(Austria) Philipp Eng	9	**4**															3	4	18
12	(Bahrain) Hamad Al Fardan	DNS	14	Ret	18	5	8	7	4	8	21†	21†	Ret							13
13	(Ukraine) Sergey Chukanov	5	9	10	7	11	9	10	21	16	9	12	9	16	9	Ret	12	11	8	8
14	(Switzerland) Rahel Frey	10	10	6	Ret	9	11	11	18	18	12	9	13	8	Ret	18	23†			5
15	(Luxembourg) David Hauser	7	8	12	10	22	18	Ret	17	10	11	11	Ret	11	14	11	8	10	11	5
16	(Luxembourg) Gary Hauser	Ret	7	13	20	Ret	15	12	Ret	12	18	Ret	Ret	Ret	17	10	10	9	12	4
17	(Germany) Jens Höing	Ret	Ret	DNS	DNS	8	10	14	10					Ret	12	9	9	Ret	Ret	1
	(Italy) Federico Glorioso	Ret	23	Ret	19	12	16	Ret	Ret	15	16	17	11					12	Ret	0
	(Latvia) Karline Stala	16	26†	19	Ret	23	20	19	DNS					19	16	20†	15	15	16	0
	(Indonesia) Satrio Hermanto							Ret	9											0
	(Hong Kong) Adderly Fong	17	20							Ret	Ret	13	12	Ret	15	12	13	21	DNS	0
	(Luxembourg) Louis Wagner											19	19							0
	(Austria) Marco Oberhauser	15	16	14	16	14	17	16	20	20	15	14	15	15	Ret	14	16	13	19	0
	(Austria) Bernd Herndlhofer	13	11	18	11	19	21	Ret	16	13	14	16	17	13	19	15	19	14	17	0
	(Italy) Massimo Rossi	14	15	16	13	15	25	17	19											0
	(Netherlands) Dennis Swart	Ret	12	Ret	9	17	19	15	17	14	13	20	16	12	Ret	13	18	23†	20	0
	(Netherlands) Shirley van der Lof	Ret	13	15	14	16	23	Ret	14	19	17	18	14	15	13	Ret	17	16	15	0
	(Italy) Giulio Glorioso	19	19	21	12	18	27†	Ret	Ret	17	19	15	18	14	18	19†	22	17	21	0
	(Germany) Marcel Schlenker	Ret	18	17	15	20	22	18	Ret											0
	(Germany) Klaus-Dieter Häckel	18	17	Ret	17	21	24	DNS	DNS											0
	(Italy) Luca Iannaccone	20	22	20	21	24	26	20	22	21	20	Ret	20	20	21	17	24	22†	22	0
	(France) David Moretti	Ret	21																	0
	(Germany) Francesco Lopez													18	20	16	21	19	18	0
guest drivers ineligible for points
	(Republic of Ireland) Niall Quinn																	7	7	0
	(Finland) Tomi Limmonen																	8	13	0
	(Mexico) Esteban Gutiérrez																	Ret	10	0
Pos	Driver	HOC1		OSC1		NÜR1		HOC2		ASS		NÜR2		LAU		SAC		OSC2		Pts

Colour	Result
Gold	Winner
Silver	Second place
Bronze	Third place
Green	Points classification
Blue	Non-points classification
Blue	Non-classified finish (NC)
Purple	Retired, not classified (Ret)
Red	Did not qualify (DNQ)
Red	Did not pre-qualify (DNPQ)
Black	Disqualified (DSQ)
White	Did not start (DNS)
White	Withdrew (WD)
White	Race cancelled (C)
Blank	Did not practice (DNP)
Blank	Did not arrive (DNA)
Blank	Excluded (EX)

**Bold** - Pole
Italics - Fastest Lap
**W** - Wet Race

- † — Drivers did not finish the race, but were classified as they completed over 90% of the race distance.

=== ATS Formel 3 Trophy ===
- Points are awarded as follows:

1	2	3	4	5	6	7	8
10	8	6	5	4	3	2	1

Pos	Driver	HOC1		OSC1		NÜR1		HOC2		ASS		NÜR2		LAU		SAC		OSC2		Pts
1	(Austria) Marco Oberhauser	3	5	1	7	1	1	2	6	5	3	1	2	5	Ret	2	1	1	4	118
2	(Austria) Bernd Herndlhofer	1	1	5	2	6	3	Ret	4	1	2	3	4	2	3	3	4	2	2	116
3	(Netherlands) Dennis Swart	Ret	2	Ret	1	4	2	1	1	2	1	5	3	1	Ret	1	3	7†	5	111
4	(Netherlands) Shirley van der Lof	Ret	3	2	5	3	5	Ret	2	4	4	4	1	4	1	Ret	2	3	1	100
5	(Italy) Giulio Glorioso	5	8	7	3	5	9	Ret	3	3	5	2	5	3	2	6†	6	4	6	73
6	(Italy) Massimo Rossi	2	4	3	4	2	7	3	5											44
7	(Italy) Luca Iannaccone	6	10	6	9	9	8	5	7	6	6	Ret	6	7	5	5	7	6†	7	39
8	(Germany) Francesco Lopez													6	4	4	5	5	3	27
9	(Germany) Marcel Schlenker	Ret	7	4	6	7	4	4	Ret											22
10	(Germany) Klaus-Dieter Häckel	4	6	Ret	8	8	6	DNS	DNS											13
	(France) David Moretti	Ret	9																	0
Pos	Driver	HOC1		OSC1		NÜR1		HOC2		ASS		NÜR2		LAU		SAC		OSC2		Pts

- † — Drivers did not finish the race, but were classified as they completed over 90% of the race distance.
