= Dominik Baumann =

Austrian racing driver (born 1992)

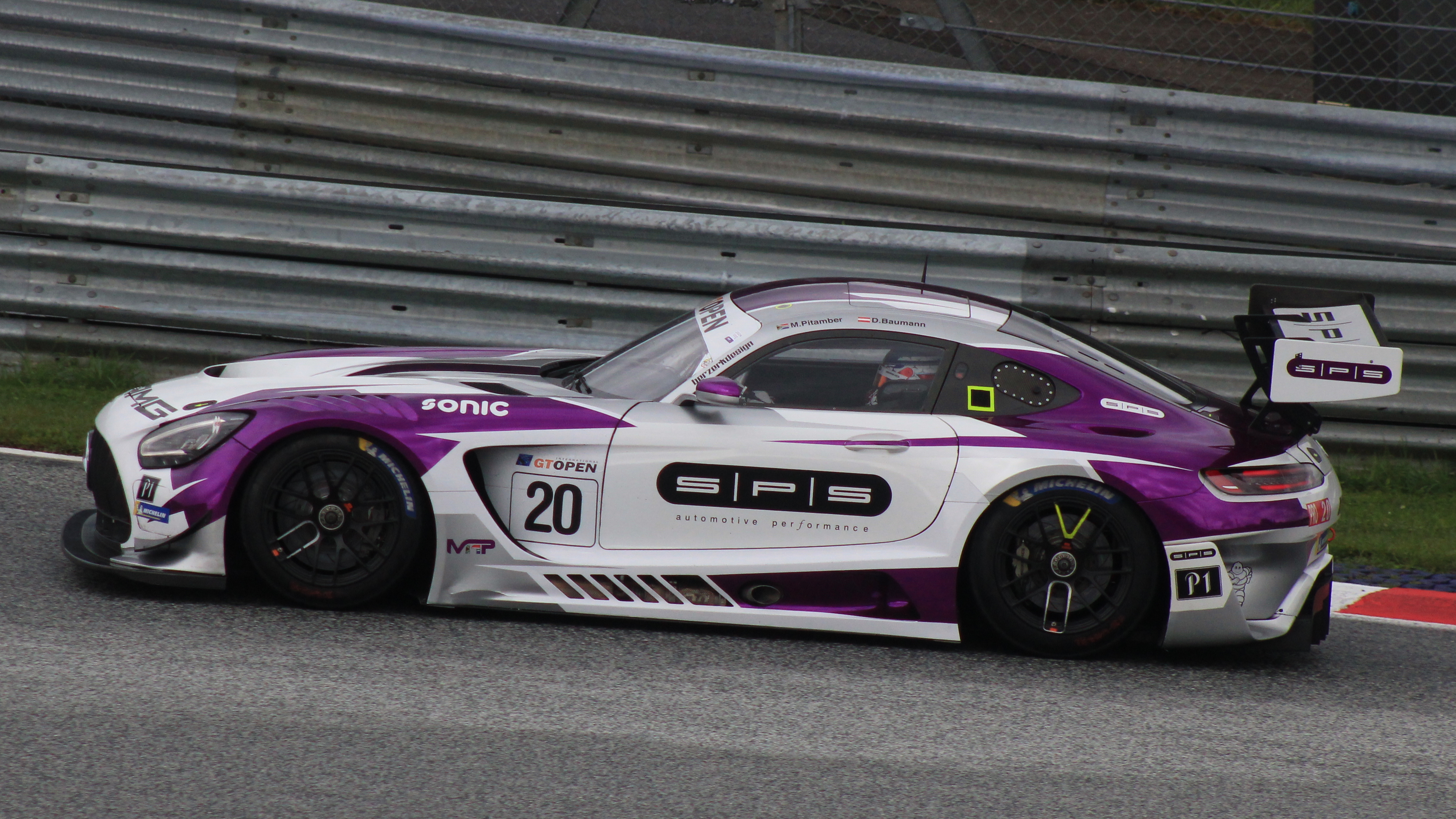
- Baumann in 2024
- Nationality: (Austria) Austrian
- Born: 4 October 1992 (age 34) Hall in Tirol, Austria
- Categorisation: FIA Silver (until 2013); FIA Gold (2014–)

Championship titles
- 2025 2016 2012: International GT Open – Pro-Am; Blancpain GT Series; FIA GT3 European Championship

Dominik Baumann (born 4 October 1992 in Hall in Tirol) is an Austrian racing driver who last competed in International GT Open for Team Motopark.

A decorated Mercedes-AMG factory driver, Baumann partnered Maximilian Buhk en route to two major titles: the FIA GT3 European Championship in 2012 and the Blancpain GT Series in 2016. He also finished runner-up in the 2015 ADAC GT Masters at the wheel of a BMW Z4.

== Career ==
Baumann made his single-seater debut in ADAC Formel Masters in 2009, where he spent two seasons there before joining Mercedes-fielding Heico Motorsport to race in ADAC GT Masters and the FIA GT3 European Championship. In ADAC GT Masters, Baumann took four podiums on his way to fifth in points, while in the latter, Baumann took his maiden series win at the Slovakia Ring, helping him to finish fourth in points at season's end.

In 2012, Baumann remained with Heico Motorsport for a double program in both ADAC GT Masters and the FIA GT3 European Championship. In the former, Baumann scored a lone podium at the season-ending round at Hockenheimring as he ended the season ninth in points. Whereas in the latter, Baumann dominated the final season of the series by taking six wins with teammate Maximilian Buhk.

Baumann joined BMW-assisted Schubert Motorsport and Lamborghini-affiliated Grasser Racing to remain in ADAC GT Masters and the newly-rebranded FIA GT Series respectively. In the former, Baumann won at Spa and Nürburgring to secure fifth in points, whereas in the latter, Baumann finished third in the Pro-Am standings after taking class wins at Zandvoort and Baku.

Continuing in ADAC GT Masters with Schubert Motorsport for 2014, Baumann also joined them for a part-time schedule in the Blancpain GT Sprint Series. In the former, Baumann scored wins at the Lausitzring and Slovakia Ring, which helped him to secure fourth in points. In the latter, Baumann took a lone win at the Slovakia Ring as he finished eighth in points.

Remaining with Schubert Motorsport for a third season with them in ADAC GT Masters, Baumann opened up the season by taking two wins in the first half of the season at Spa and Lausitzring. The Austrian then took two more wins at Sachsenring and Zandvoort, which helped him to finish runner-up in the standings at season's end.

Baumann switched to Mercedes factory team HTP Motorsport for the 2016 season, racing alongside Maximilian Buhk for the GT Series Sprint Cup and were also joined by Jazeman Jaafar for the Endurance Cup. In the former, Baumann scored a lone win at the Hungaroring as he ended the year third in points. Meanwhile in the Endurance Cup, Baumann won at Silverstone on his way to runner-up in points as he took the overall Blancpain GT Series title after his points from both series were combined.

Staying with HTP Motorsport for a second consecutive season, Baumann returned to both the Endurance and Sprint championships, as he also made one-off appearances in the Australian GT Championship and the Michelin Le Mans Cup. Baumann scored only a best result of sixth in the Endurance Cup on his way to 15th in points, whereas he took a lone podium at Misano in the latter which helped him to end the season 14th in points.

The Austrian then moved to the IMSA SportsCar Championship for 2018, joining Lexus-fielding 3GT Racing alongside Kyle Marcelli in the GTD class. After taking his maiden win at Mid-Ohio, Baumann won again at Virginia International Raceway en route to fifth in points in his only full season in the series.

Following a sparse racing schedule in 2019 headlined by wins in the VLN Series and Michelin Pilot Challenge, Baumann returned to full-time competition and Mercedes-running teams in 2020 by joining SPS Automotive Performance to compete in the Pro-Am class of the GT World Challenge Europe Sprint Cup. Racing in all but one rounds, Baumann finished on the class podium all but once in the three rounds he contested en route to a fourth-place class points finish at season's end.

Baumann remained with SPS Automotive Performance in 2021, racing full-time in both the GT World Challenge Europe Endurance and Sprint Cups in the Pro-Am class. In the former, Baumann took a lone class win at Barcelona and finished sixth in points. Whereas in the latter, Baumann took class wins at both Zandvoort and Valencia on his way to runner-up honors in the Pro-Am standings.

Staying with SPS Automotive Performance for a third consecutive season, Baumann only drove in the Endurance Cup alongside Valentin Pierburg, Ian Loggie and a one-off appearance by Kenny Habul at the 24 Hours of Spa. Despite taking three class wins in the five-race season, Baumann lost out on the title after renouncing his points scored at Spa to match his teammate's tally to be eligible for the Pro-Am standings, but was still able to help the team in securing the Pro-Am team's title.

In 2023, Baumann only raced twice, taking part at the 2023 Gulf 12 Hours for SunEnergy1 Racing and making a one-off appearance at the season-ending Barcelona round of International GT Open, where he won race two.

The following year, Baumann returned to full-time competition, returning to SPS Automotive Performance alongside in International GT Open, and joining AlManar by GetSpeed to race in GT World Challenge Europe Endurance Cup. Driving with Mikaeel Pitamber in the former, Baumann scored three podiums with a best result of second at Algarve as they finished seventh in points. Sharing the car with Al Faisal Al Zubair and Mikaël Grenier, the trio scored a Gold Cup win at the 24 Hours of Spa with Philip Ellis and ended the season runner-up in class.

Baumann returned to SPS Automotive Performance for 2025, joining Valentin Pierburg in the Pro-Am class. In his first season in the Pro-Am class, Baumann scored class wins at Algarve and Le Castellet, and took seven more podiums to secure the class title in the season-finale at Monza. Remaining in International GT Open for 2026, Baumann switched to Team Motopark for his third full-time season in the series. In parallel, Baumann was also set to join 75 Express in the GT World Challenge Europe Endurance Cup, but later made a guest appearance in the Algarve finale with Motopark. In GT Open, Baumann took a best result of fifth at Algarve en route to 12th in the overall standings.

== Personal life ==
Baumann is the son of erstwhile gentleman driver Oliver Baumann, who once raced in the Blancpain GT Sports Club.

== Karting record ==
=== Karting career summary ===
Season	Series	Team	Position
2005	Deutsche Kart-Meisterschaft — Junior		30th
2006	Deutsche Kart-Meisterschaft — Junior		16th
2006	Champions Cup — 100 Junior		17th
2006	Monaco Kart Cup — ICA Junior	Swiss Hutless International	26th
2006	Karting European Championship — Junior	Swiss Hutless International	
2006	Trofeo Delle Industrie — 100 Junior		55th
2007	South Garda Winter Cup — KF3	Swiss Hutless International	NC
2007	Deutsche Kart-Meisterschaft — KF3		10th
2007	Italian Open Masters — KF3	Birel ART	75th
2007	Karting European Championship — KF3	Birel ART	
2008	South Garda Winter Cup — KF2	KSB Racing Team	NC
2008	Andrea Margutti Trophy — KF2	KSB Racing Team	25th
2008	Trofeo Delle Industrie — KF2	KSB Racing Team	31st
2008	ADAC Kart Masters — KF2	KSB Racing Team	40th
2008	German Challenger Kart Championship — KF2	KSB Racing Team	4th
2008	WSK International Series — KF2	KSB Racing Team	60th
2008	Karting European Championship — KF2	KSB Racing Team	NC
2008	Karting World Cup — KF2	KSB Racing Team	NC
2011	24 Hours of Leipzig	Neuhauser Racing	16th

== Racing record ==
=== Racing career summary ===
Season	Series	Team	Races	Wins	Poles	F/Laps	Podiums	Points	Position
2009	ADAC Formel Masters	Neuhauser Racing	16	0	0	0	0	31	12th
2010	ADAC Formel Masters	Neuhauser Racing	21	0	0	2	4	118	7th
2010	Mini Challenge Germany	Fast Forward - Team Spicy	6	0	0	0	1	64	17th
2011	Dubai 24 Hour – A6	Team Rhino's Leipert	1	0	0	0	0	—N/a	15th
2011	ADAC GT Masters	Heico Motorsport	16	0	0	0	4	110	5th
2011	FIA GT3 European Championship	Heico Motorsport	12	1	0	0	3	95	4th
2012	ADAC GT Masters	Heico Motorsport	16	0	0	0	1	80	9th
2012	FIA GT3 European Championship	Heico Motorsport-Charouz Team	12	6	3	3	8	214	**1st**
2012	International GT Open – Pro-Am	Seyffarth Motorsport	2	0	0	0	1	0	NC
2012	Blancpain Endurance Series – Pro	Black Falcon	1	0	0	0	0	0	NC
2013	Dubai 24 Hour – A6	Saudi Falcons Team Schubert	1	0	0	0	0	—N/a	13th
2013	ADAC GT Masters	PIXUM Team Schubert	16	2	0	0	6	148	5th
2013	FIA GT Series – Pro-Am	Grasser Racing	10	2	0	0	7	113	**3rd**
2013	24 Hours of Nürburgring – V3	Leutheuser Racing	1	0	0	0	0	—N/a	7th
2014	GT Sprint Series – Pro	BMW Sports Trophy Team Schubert	10	1	0	1	2	45	8th
2014	VLN Langstrecken Serie – SP9	BMW Sports Trophy Team Schubert	3	1	0	0	1	0	NC
2014	24 Hours of Nürburgring – SP9	BMW Sports Trophy Team Schubert	1	0	0	0	0	—N/a	6th
2014	ADAC GT Masters	PIXUM Team Schubert	16	2	1	0	5	177	4th
2015	ADAC GT Masters	PIXUM Team Schubert	16	4	1	0	5	186	**2nd**
2015	Blancpain Endurance Series – Pro	PIXUM Team Schubert	1	0	0	0	0	0	NC
2015	VLN Langstrecken Serie – SP9	PIXUM Team Schubert	1	0	0	0	1	0	NC
2015	24 Hours of Nürburgring – SP9	PIXUM Team Schubert	1	0	0	0	0	—N/a	NC
2016	Blancpain GT Series Endurance Cup	HTP Motorsport	3	1	1	0	2	67	**2nd**
2016	Blancpain GT Series Endurance Cup	AMG - Team HTP Motorsport	2	0	0	0	0	67	**2nd**
2016	GT Series Sprint Cup	HTP Motorsport	6	0	0	0	1	67	**3rd**
2016	GT Series Sprint Cup	AMG - Team HTP Motorsport	4	1	0	0	1	67	**3rd**
2016	VLN Langstrecken Serie – SP9	AMG - Team HTP Motorsport	4	0	0	0	0	0	NC
2016	24 Hours of Nürburgring – SP9	AMG - Team HTP Motorsport	1	0	0	0	0	—N/a	NC
2016	Intercontinental GT Challenge	AMG - Team HTP Motorsport	1	0	0	0	0	10	13th
2017	Blancpain GT Series Endurance Cup	HTP Motorsport	5	0	0	0	0	27	15th
2017	GT Series Sprint Cup	HTP Motorsport	10	0	0	0	1	21	14th
2017	Intercontinental GT Challenge	HTP Motorsport	1	0	0	0	0	6	13th
2017	Australian GT Championship	Hog's Breath Cafe/Griffith Corporation	1	0	0	0	0	121	27th
2017	24 Hours of Nürburgring – SP9	Mercedes-AMG - Team HTP Motorsport	1	0	0	0	0	—N/a	NC
2017	Le Mans Cup – GT3	Lee Mowle	1	1	0	0	1	25	9th
2018	IMSA SportsCar Championship – GTD	3GT Racing	11	2	0	1	3	268	5th
2018	24H GT Series – A6	SPS automotive performance	1	0	0	0	0	0	NC
2018	VLN Langstrecken Serie – SP9 Pro	AMG - Team HTP Motorsport	3	1	0	0	1	13.7	15th
2018	24 Hours of Nürburgring – SP9	AMG - Team HTP Motorsport	1	0	0	0	0	—N/a	NC
2018	Blancpain GT Series Endurance Cup	R-Motorsport	2	0	0	0	0	1	47th
2018	ADAC GT Masters	AutoArenA Motorsport	2	0	0	0	0	1	40th
2019	Intercontinental GT Challenge	SunEnergy1 Racing	1	0	0	0	0	1	37th
2019	Intercontinental GT Challenge	Strakka Racing	1	0	0	0	0	1	37th
2019	IMSA SportsCar Championship – GTD	P1 Motorsports	1	0	0	0	0	12	66th
2019	VLN Langstrecken Serie – SPX	Black Falcon	1	0	0	0	0	0	NC
2019	VLN Langstrecken Serie – SP9	GetSpeed Performance	3	1	0	0	2	16.67	18th
2019	TCR Europe Touring Car Series	Target Competition	6	0	0	0	0	111	15th
2019	TCR Ibérico Touring Car Series	Target Competition	2	0	0	0	0	8	21st
2019	24H GT Series – SPX	Leipert Motorsport	1	1	0	0	1	28	NC
2019	Michelin Pilot Challenge – GS	Winward Racing/HTP Motorsport	1	1	0	0	1	35	53rd
2020	24H GT Series – GT3	SPS Automotive Performance	1	0	0	0	0	18	NC
2020	GT World Challenge Europe Sprint Cup – Pro-Am	SPS Automotive Performance	8	0	0	4	7	84	4th
2020	GT World Challenge Europe Endurance Cup – Pro-Am	SPS Automotive Performance	1	0	0	0	0	11	22nd
2020	Intercontinental GT Challenge	SunEnergy1 Racing	1	0	0	0	0	0	NC
2020	Intercontinental GT Challenge	CrowdStrike Racing by SPS	1	0	0	0	0	0	NC
2020	Nürburgring Langstrecken-Serie – SP9 Pro	Mercedes-AMG Team HRT	4	0	0	0	1	14.47	36th
2020	24 Hours of Nürburgring – SP9	Mercedes-AMG Team HRT AutoArena	1	0	0	0	0	—N/a	8th
2021	GT World Challenge Europe Endurance Cup – Pro-Am	SPS Automotive Performance	5	1	0	1	5	69	6th
2021	GT World Challenge Europe Sprint Cup – Pro-Am	SPS Automotive Performance	10	2	2	4	9	116.5	**2nd**
2021	24 Hours of Nürburgring – SP9	10Q Racing Team Hauer & Zabel GbR	1	0	0	0	0	—N/a	10th
2022	GT World Challenge Europe Endurance Cup – Pro-Am	SPS Automotive Performance	4	3	0	0	4	101	**2nd**
2022	GT World Challenge Europe Endurance Cup – Pro-Am	SunEnergy1 Racing by SPS	1	0	0	0	1	101	**2nd**
2022	Intercontinental GT Challenge	SunEnergy1 Racing by SPS	1	0	0	0	0	0	NC
2022	Intercontinental GT Challenge	SunEnergy1 Racing by AKKodis ASP	1	0	0	0	0	0	NC
2022	International GT Open – Pro-Am	SPS Automotive Performance	2	0	0	0	0	0	22nd
2022	24 Hours of Nürburgring – SP9 Pro-Am	Mercedes-AMG Mann-Filter Team Landgraf	1	0	0	0	0	—N/a	NC
2023	Intercontinental GT Challenge	SunEnergy1 Racing	1	0	0	0	0	0	NC
2023	International GT Open	SPS Automotive Performance	2	1	0	0	1	0	NC
2024	GT World Challenge Europe Endurance Cup – Gold	AlManar Racing by GetSpeed	5	1	1	1	5	104	**2nd**
2024	Intercontinental GT Challenge	AlManar Racing by GetSpeed	1	0	0	0	0	0	NC
2024	International GT Open	SPS Automotive Performance	14	0	2	0	3	84	7th
2025	International GT Open	SPS Automotive Performance	14	0	0	0	0	16	16th
2025	International GT Open – Pro-Am	SPS Automotive Performance	14	2	2	3	9	98	**1st**
2025	Intercontinental GT Challenge	75 Express	1	0	0	0	0	0	NC
2026	International GT Open	Team Motopark	14	0	0	1	0	34	12th
2026	GT World Challenge Europe Endurance Cup	Team Motopark	1	0	0	0	0	0	NC†

=== Complete ADAC Formel Masters results ===
(key) (Races in bold indicate pole position) (Races in italics indicate fastest lap)

Year	Team	1	2	3	4	5	6	7	8	9	10	11	12	13	14	15	16	17	18	19	20	21	Pos	Points
2009	Neuhauser Racing	OSC1; 1; 10	OSC1; 2; 15	ASS; 1; 6	ASS; 2; 12	NÜR1; 1; 13	NÜR1; 2; 15	HOC; 1 Ret	HOC; 2 Ret	LAU; 1; 9	LAU; 2; 8	NÜR2; 1; 10	NÜR2; 2; 10	SAC; 1; 5	SAC; 2; 7	OSC2; 1; 7	OSC2; 2; 10						12th	31
2010	Neuhauser Racing	OSC1; 1; 4	OSC1; 2 Ret	OSC1; 3; 10	SAC; 1; 4	SAC; 2; 13	SAC; 3; 13	HOC; 1; 4	HOC; 2; 4	HOC; 3; 12	ASS; 1; 13	ASS; 2; 10	ASS; 3; 7	LAU; 1; 7	LAU; 2; 7	LAU; 3; 8	NÜR; 1; 3	NÜR; 2; 9	NÜR; 3; 9	OSC2; 1; 2	OSC2; 2; 2	OSC2; 3; 2	7th	118

=== Complete ADAC GT Masters results ===
(key) (Races in bold indicate pole position) (Races in italics indicate fastest lap)

Year	Team	Car	1	2	3	4	5	6	7	8	9	10	11	12	13	14	15	16	DC	Points
2011	Heico Motorsport	Mercedes-Benz SLS AMG GT3	OSC; 1; 18	OSC; 2; 16	SAC; 1; 5	SAC; 2; 19	ZOL; 1; 16	ZOL; 2; 7	NÜR; 1; 2	NÜR; 2; 3	RBR; 1; 12	RBR; 2; 3	LAU; 1; 9	LAU; 2; 6	ASS; 1; 4	ASS; 2; 2	HOC; 1; 7	HOC; 2; 15	5th	110
2012	Heico Motorsport	Mercedes-Benz SLS AMG GT3	OSC; 1; 6	OSC; 2; 6	ZAN; 1; 8	ZAN; 2; 11	SAC; 1; 5	SAC; 2; 18	NÜR; 1; 8	NÜR; 2; 11	RBR; 1; 7	RBR; 2 Ret	LAU; 1; 5	LAU; 2; 14	NÜR; 1 Ret	NÜR; 2 Ret	HOC; 1; 4	HOC; 2; 2	9th	80
2013	PIXUM Team Schubert	BMW Z4 GT3	OSC; 1; 8	OSC; 2; 7	SPA; 1; 7	SPA; 2; 1	SAC; 1; 13	SAC; 2; 2	NÜR; 1; 11	NÜR; 2; 1	RBR; 1; 19	RBR; 2; 22	LAU; 1; 2	LAU; 2; 2	SVK; 1; 3	SVK; 2; 10	HOC; 1; 4	HOC; 2 Ret	5th	148
2014	PIXUM Team Schubert	BMW Z4 GT3	OSC; 1; 6	OSC; 2; 3	ZAN; 1; 4	ZAN; 2; 5	LAU; 1; 4	**LAU**; **2**; 1	RBR; 1; 20	RBR; 2; 4	SLO; 1; 1	SLO; 2; 3	NÜR; 1; 9	NÜR; 2; 15	SAC; 1; 3	SAC; 2; 6	HOC; 1; 6	HOC; 2; 5	4th	177
2015	BMW Sports Trophy Team Schubert	BMW Z4 GT3	OSC; 1; 5	OSC; 2; 7	RBR; 1 Ret	RBR; 2 Ret	SPA; 1; 1	SPA; 2; 5	LAU; 1; 1	LAU; 2; 4	NÜR; 1; 12	NÜR; 2; 4	SAC; 1; 1	SAC; 2; 8	ZAN; 1; 10	**ZAN**; **2**; 1	HOC; 1; 4	HOC; 2; 3	2nd	186
2018	AutoArenA Motorsport	Mercedes-AMG GT3	OSC; 1	OSC; 2	MST; 1	MST; 2	RBR; 1	RBR; 2	NÜR; 1	NÜR; 2	ZAN; 1	ZAN; 2	SAC; 1	SAC; 2	HOC; 1; 10	HOC; 2; 25			40th	1

=== Complete FIA GT3 European Championship results ===
(key) (Races in bold indicate pole position; races in italics indicate fastest lap)

Year	Entrant	Chassis	Engine	1	2	3	4	5	6	7	8	9	10	11	12	Pos.	Points
2011	Heico Motorsport	Mercedes-Benz SLS AMG GT3	Mercedes-Benz 6.2 L V8	ALG; 1 Ret	ALG; 2; 3	SIL; 1; 12	SIL; 2 Ret	NAV; 1; 4	NAV; 2; 7	LEC; 1; 6	LEC; 2 Ret	SLO; 1; 1	SLO; 2; 10	ZAN; 1; 5	ZAN; 2; 2	4th	95
2012	Heico Gravity-Charouz Team	Mercedes-Benz SLS AMG GT3	Mercedes-Benz 6.2 L V8	NOG; 1; 3	NOG; 2; 1	ZOL; 1; 5	ZOL; 2; 3	NAV; 1; 8	NAV; 2; 1	ALG; 1; 1	ALG; 2; 5	MSC; 1; 1	MSC; 2; 5	NUR; 1; 1	NUR; 2; 1	1st	214

=== Complete GT World Challenge Europe results ===
==== GT World Challenge Europe Endurance Cup ====
(key) (Races in bold indicate pole position) (Races in italics indicate fastest lap)

Year	Team	Car	Class	1	2	3	4	5	6	7	8	Pos.	Points
2012	Black Falcon	Mercedes-Benz SLS AMG GT3	Pro	MNZ	SIL	LEC	SPA; 6H	SPA; 12H	SPA; 24H	NÜR	NAV; Ret	NC	0
2015	BMW Sports Trophy Team Schubert	BMW Z4 GT3	Pro	MNZ	SIL; Ret	LEC	SPA; 6H	SPA; 12H	SPA; 24H	NÜR		NC	0
2016	HTP Motorsport	Mercedes-AMG GT3	Pro	**MNZ**; 2	SIL; 1	LEC; Ret						2nd	67
2016	AMG - Team HTP Motorsport	Mercedes-AMG GT3	Pro				SPA; 6H; 13	SPA; 12H; 7	SPA; 24H; 6	NÜR; 4		2nd	67
2017	HTP Motorsport	Mercedes-AMG GT3	Pro	MNZ; Ret	SIL; 37	LEC; Ret	SPA; 6H; 6	SPA; 12H; 2	SPA; 24H; 7	CAT; 6		15th	27
2018	R-Motorsport	Aston Martin V12 Vantage GT3	Pro	MON	SIL	LEC	SPA; 6H; 17	SPA; 12H; 17	**SPA**; **24H**; 35	CAT; 19		47th	1
2020	SPS Automotive Performance	Mercedes-AMG GT3 Evo	Pro-Am	IMO	NÜR	SPA; 6H; 45	SPA; 12H; 36	SPA; 24H; 27	LEC			22nd	11
2021	SPS Automotive Performance	Mercedes-AMG GT3 Evo	Pro-Am	MNZ; 28	LEC; 28	SPA; 6H; 41	SPA; 12H; 26	SPA; 24H; 25	NÜR; 27	CAT; 25		6th	69
2022	SPS Automotive Performance	Mercedes-AMG GT3 Evo	Pro-Am	IMO; 32	LEC; 24				HOC; 31	CAT; 31		2nd	101
2022	SunEnergy1 Racing by SPS	Mercedes-AMG GT3 Evo	Pro-Am			SPA; 6H; 46	SPA; 12H; 39	SPA; 24H; 28				2nd	101
2024	AlManar Racing by GetSpeed	Mercedes-AMG GT3 Evo	Gold	**LEC**; 15	SPA; 6H; 30	SPA; 12H; 23	SPA; 24H; 7	NÜR; 17	MNZ; Ret	JED; 20		2nd	104
2026	Team Motopark	Mercedes-AMG GT3 Evo	Pro	LEC	MNZ	SPA; 6H	SPA; 12H	SPA; 24H	NÜR	ALG; Ret		NC	0

==== GT World Challenge Europe Sprint Cup ====
(key) (Races in bold indicate pole position) (Races in italics indicate fastest lap)

Year	Team	Car	Class	1	2	3	4	5	6	7	8	9	10	11	12	13	14	Pos.	Points
2013	GRT Grasser Racing Team	Lamborghini Gallardo LP560-4	Pro-Am	NOG; QR; 11	NOG; CR; 8	ZOL; QR; 12	ZOL; CR; 10	ZAN; QR; 10	ZAN; QR; 5	SVK; QR; 14	SVK; CR; 6	NAV; QR	NAV; CR	BAK; QR; Ret	BAK; CR; 5			3rd	113
2014	BMW Sports Trophy Team Schubert	BMW Z4 GT3	Pro	NOG; QR	NOG; CR	BRH; QR	BRH; CR	ZAN; QR; 5	ZAN; CR; 2	SVK; QR; Ret	SVK; CR; 1	ALG; QR; 13	ALG; CR; 13	ZOL; QR; 8	ZOL; CR; Ret	BAK; QR; Ret	BAK; CR; Ret	8th	45
2016	HTP Motorsport	Mercedes-AMG GT3	Pro	MIS; QR; 5	MIS; CR; 2	BRH; QR; 18	BRH; CR; 7	NÜR; QR; 10	NÜR; CR; 6									3rd	67
2016	AMG - Team HTP Motorsport	Mercedes-AMG GT3	Pro							HUN; QR; 4	HUN; CR; 1	CAT; QR; 6	CAT; CR; 8					3rd	67
2017	HTP Motorsport	Mercedes-AMG GT3	Pro	MIS; QR; 20	MIS; CR; 3	BRH; QR; 17	BRH; CR; 22	ZOL; QR; 8	ZOL; CR; 29	HUN; QR; 11	HUN; CR; 7	NÜR; QR; 23	NÜR; CR; 17					14th	21
2020	SPS Automotive Performance	Mercedes-AMG GT3 Evo	Pro-Am	MIS; 1; 12	MIS; 2; 16	MIS; 3; 12	MAG; 1; 16	MAG; 2; 17	ZAN; 1	ZAN; 2	CAT; 1; 19	CAT; 2; 14	CAT; 3; 14					4th	84
2021	SPS Automotive Performance	Mercedes-AMG GT3 Evo	Pro-Am	MAG; 1; 21	MAG; 2; 17	ZAN; 1; 22	ZAN; 2; 20	MIS; 1; 24	MIS; 2; 19	BRH; 1; 25	BRH; 2; 25	**VAL**; **1**; 21	**VAL**; **2**; 14					2nd	116.5

=== Complete International GT Open results ===
(key) (Races in bold indicate pole position) (Races in italics indicate fastest lap)

Year	Team	Car	Class	1	2	3	4	5	6	7	8	9	10	11	12	13	14	15	16	Pos.	Points
2012	Seyffarth Motorsport	Mercedes-Benz SLS AMG GT3	GTS	ALG; 1	ALG; 2	NUR; 1	NUR; 2	SPA; 1	SPA; 2	BRH; 1	BRH; 2	LEC; 1	LEC; 2	HUN; 1	HUN; 2	MNZ; 1	MNZ; 2	CAT; 1; 5	CAT; 2; 3	NC	0
2022	SPS Automotive Performance	Mercedes-AMG GT3 Evo	Pro-Am	EST; 1	EST; 2	LEC; 1	LEC; 2	SPA	HUN; 1; 7	HUN; 2; 9	RBR; 1	RBR; 2	MNZ; 1	MNZ; 2	CAT; 1	CAT; 2				22nd	0
2023	SPS Automotive Performance	Mercedes-AMG GT3 Evo	Pro	ALG; 1	ALG; 2	SPA	HUN; 1	HUN; 2	LEC; 1	LEC; 2	RBR; 1	RBR; 2	MNZ; 1	MNZ; 2	CAT; 1 Ret	CAT; 2; 1				NC	0
2024	SPS Automotive Performance	Mercedes-AMG GT3 Evo	Pro	ALG; 1; 8	**ALG**; **2**; 2	HOC; 1; 6	HOC; 2; 4	SPA; 4	**HUN**; **1**; 5	HUN; 2; 3	LEC; 1; 6	LEC; 2; 9	RBR; 1 Ret	RBR; 2; 10	CAT; 1; 3	CAT; 2; 5	MNZ; 13			7th	84
2025	SPS Automotive Performance	Mercedes-AMG GT3 Evo	Pro-Am	ALG; 1; 1	ALG; 2; 2	SPA; 2	**HOC**; **1**; 2	HOC; 2; 6	HUN; 1; 8	HUN; 2; 3	LEC; 1; 1	LEC; 2; 9	RBR; 1; 5	RBR; 2; 4	CAT; 1; 2	**CAT**; **2**; 2	MNZ; 3			1st	98
2026	Team Motopark	Mercedes-AMG GT3 Evo	Pro	ALG; 1; 5	ALG; 2; 11	SPA; 17	MIS; 1; 21	MIS; 2; 6	HUN; 1; 6	HUN; 2; 17	LEC; 1; 9	LEC; 2; 10	HOC; 1; 9	HOC; 2; 7	MNZ; 9	CAT; 1; 28	CAT; 2; 6			12th	34

=== Complete IMSA SportsCar Championship results ===
(key) (Races in bold indicate pole position; results in italics indicate fastest lap)

	Team	Class	Make	Engine	1	2	3	4	5	6	7	8	9	10	11	Pos.	Points
2018	3GT Racing	GTD	Lexus RC F GT3	Lexus 5.0 L V8	DAY; 15	SEB; 14	MOH; 1	BEL; 6	WGL; 13	MOS; 2	LIM; 7	ELK; 6	VIR; 1	LGA; 10	PET; 11	5th	268
2019	P1 Motorsports	GTD	Mercedes-AMG GT3	Mercedes-AMG M159 6.2 L V8	DAY; 19	SEB	MDO	DET	WGL	MOS	LIM	ELK	VIR	LGA	PET	66th	12

=== Complete Bathurst 12 Hour results ===
Year	Team	Co-drivers	Car	Class	Laps	Pos.	Class pos.
2019	(Australia) SunEnergy1 Racing	(Australia) Kenny Habul (Germany) Thomas Jäger	Mercedes-AMG GT3	Pro-Am	204	DNF	DNF
2020	(Australia) SunEnergy1 Racing	(Australia) Kenny Habul (Austria) Martin Konrad (Australia) David Reynolds	Mercedes-AMG GT3 Evo	Pro-Am	290	20th	4th

=== Complete TCR Europe Touring Car Series results ===
(key) (Races in bold indicate pole position) (Races in italics indicate fastest lap)

Year	Team	Car	1	2	3	4	5	6	7	8	9	10	11	12	13	14	DC	Points
2019	Target Competition	Hyundai i30 N TCR	HUN; 1	HUN; 2	HOC; 1	HOC; 2	SPA; 1	SPA; 2	RBR; 1	RBR; 2	OSC; 1; 4	OSC; 2; 4	CAT; 1; 7	CAT; 2; 9	MNZ; 1; 8	MNZ; 2; 10	15th	111
