= Maximilian Buhk =

German racing driver (born 1992)

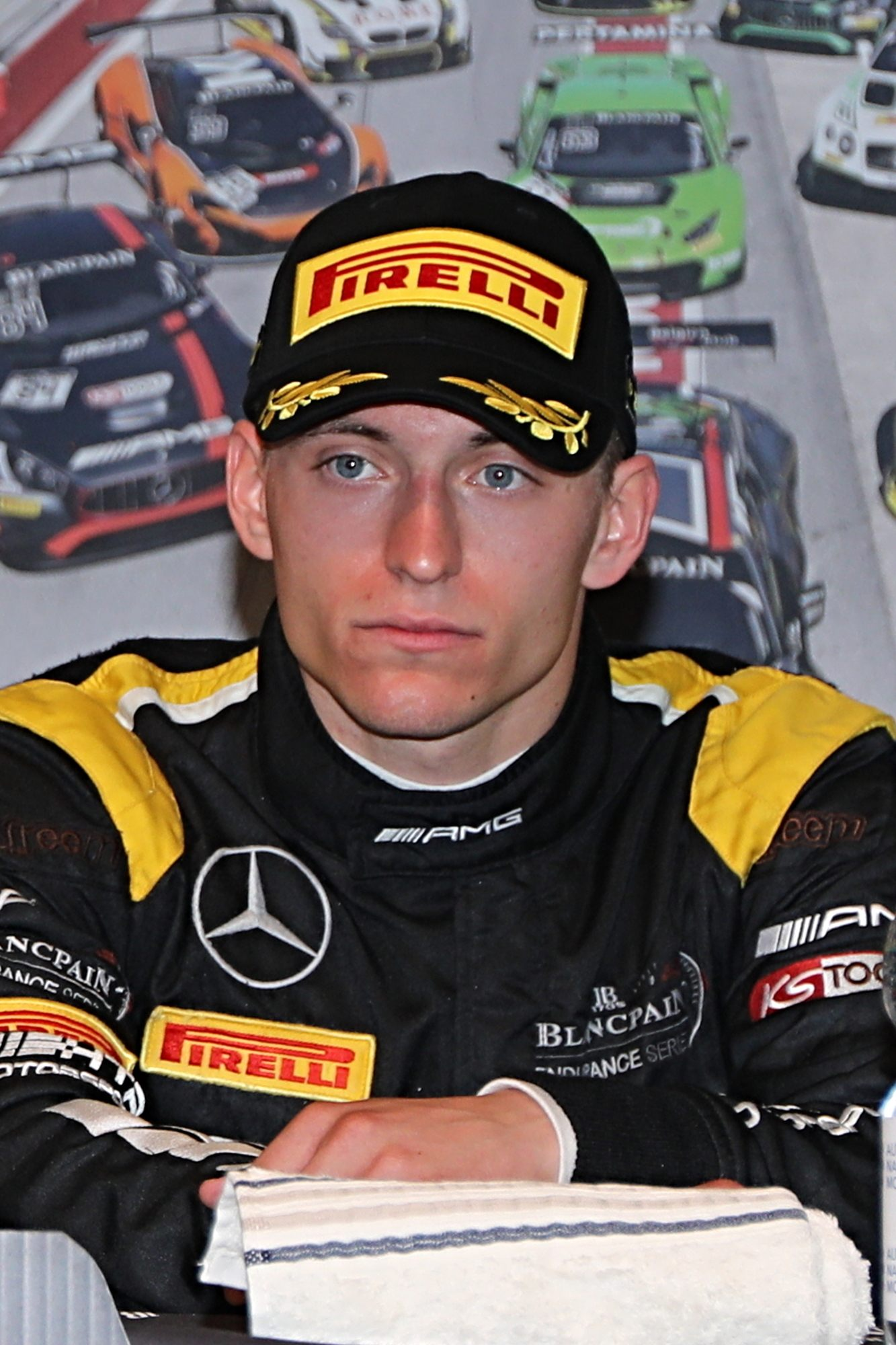
- Nationality: (Germany) German
- Born: 9 December 1992 (age 33) Reinbek, Germany

Blancpain GT Series Endurance Cup career
- Debut season: 2013
- Current team: Strakka Racing
- Categorisation: FIA Silver (until 2013); FIA Gold (2014–2015); FIA Platinum (2016–)
- Car number: 43
- Former teams: HTP Motorsport
- Starts: 23
- Wins: 3
- Poles: 1
- Fastest laps: 0
- Best finish: 1st in 2013

Previous series
- 2017-18 2014-18 2017 2012-15 2013 2012 2010–11: ADAC GT Masters; Blancpain GT Series Sprint Cup; Blancpain GT Series Asia; ADAC GT Masters; FIA GT Series; FIA GT3 European Championship; ADAC Formel Masters

Championship titles
- 2016 2015 2013 2012: Blancpain GT Series; Blancpain GT Series Sprint Cup; Blancpain GT Series Endurance Cup; FIA GT3 European Championship

Maximilian Buhk (born 9 December 1992 in Reinbek) is a German retired racing driver. He experienced considerable success racing for Mercedes-AMG in the GT3 scene, winning the 2012 FIA GT3 European Championship and 2013 Blancpain Endurance Series, before taking the 2015 Blancpain GT Sprint Series title as part of the Bentley factory lineup.

In 2016, Buhk returned to the Mercedes-AMG factory stable to win the overall Blancpain GT Series alongside Dominik Baumann that year. Following six further years with the German brand, Buhk retired from racing in 2022 after two seasons in the DTM.

== Career ==
=== Karting ===
Buhk began karting in 2004 and raced only in his native Germany for the majority of his career, working his way up from the junior ranks to progress through to the KF2 category by 2009, when he finished on fifth position in ADAC Kart Masters.

=== ADAC Formel Masters ===
2010 saw Buhk's debut in the ADAC Formel Masters championship with KUG Motorsport. He finished twelfth in the championship with 12 point-scoring finishes. He remained in series for 2011 but switched to ma-con after five rounds with KUG Motorsport. The switch open road to the podium step at Lausitz and Assen and progress to ninth in the championship.

=== Sports car racing ===
For 2012, Buhk moved into the Sports car racing, competing in both 2012 ADAC GT Masters and 2012 FIA GT3 European Championship. Andreas Simonsen was Buhk's teammate in the ADAC series, where they finished eleventh. With Dominik Baumann they dominated the main category of the FIA GT3 European Championship, winning half of the races and the drivers' title on their Mercedes-Benz SLS AMG GT3.

In 2013, the FIA GT3 European Championship was merged with FIA GT1 World Championship to form FIA GT Series, where Buhk continued to race. He was paired with Alon Day in HTP Motorsport, they were victorious at Zandvoort, but were only seventh in the championship. He remained in the ADAC GT Masters where he participated with Maximilian Götz. They won race at Nürburgring and ended third in the standings. He also expanded his programme to compete in the Blancpain Endurance Series. Despite missing two opening rounds, he won 2013 24 Hours of Spa as well as the season finale at Nürburgring, which brought him title in the series.

In 2014, Buhk kept his three-championship programme with HTP. FIA GT Series was renamed into the Blancpain Sprint Series. He again shared Mercedes-Benz SLS AMG with Götz and was set to claim another championship title after three wins but was forced to miss Slovakia Ring round and the remainder of the 2014 ADAC GT Masters season due to his suspension for non-compliance with safety car regulations in the same circuit in the ADAC GT Masters event. But later his racing license was restored, allowing him return to racing. In the Blancpain Endurance Series, he had just one podium an ended the season fourth. Also for the first time Sprint and Endurance series formed Blancpain GT Series in which Buhk finished as runner-up to Laurens Vanthoor.

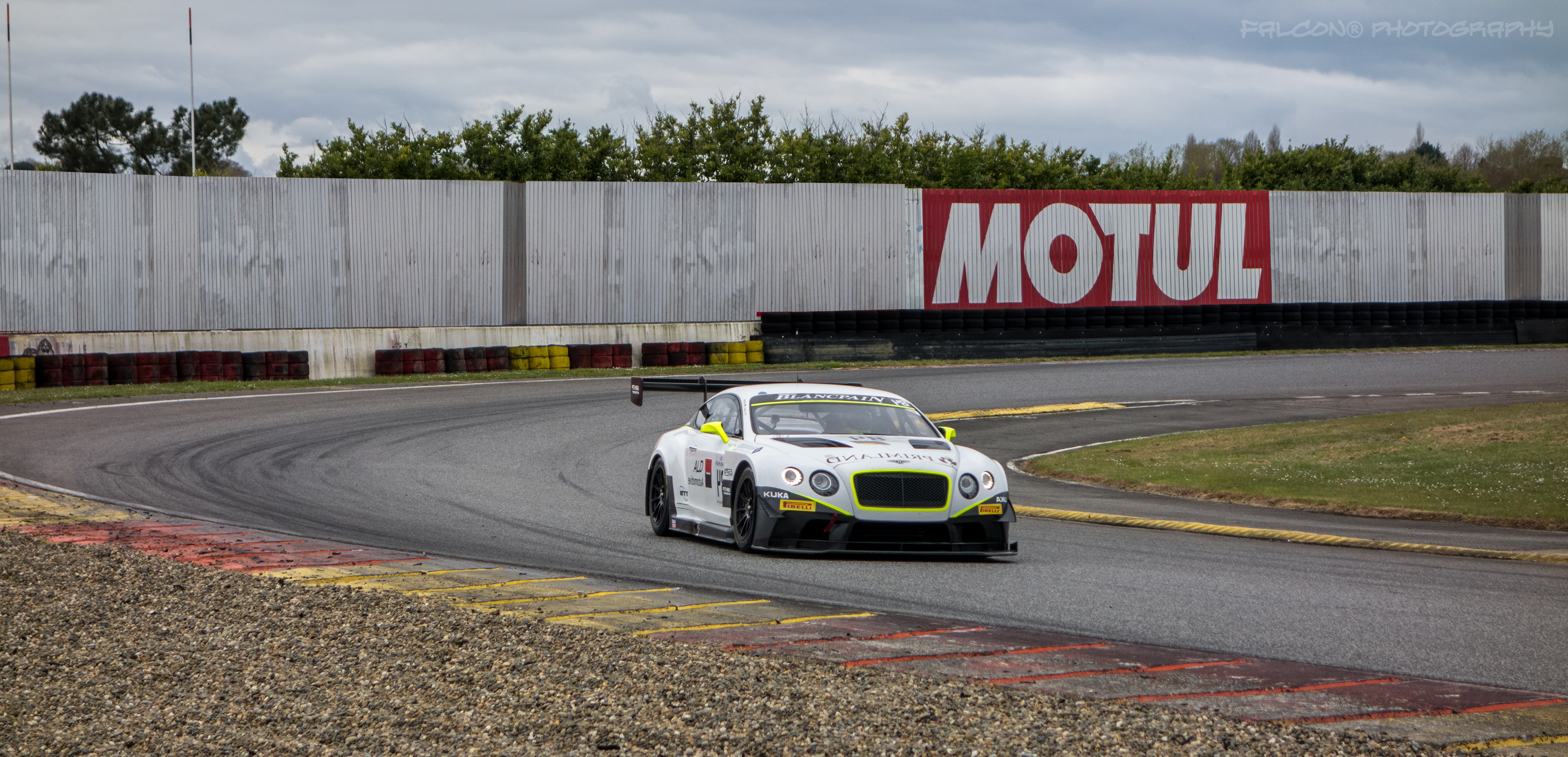
Bentley Continental GT3 car of Abril-Buhk during the Nogaro weekend of the 2015 Blancpain Sprint Series

For 2015, Buhk concentrated on Blancpain GT Series programme, where he was again runner-up, this time to Robin Frijns. His team HTP decided to use Bentley Continental GT3 car and make Vincent Abril as his teammate in the Sprint Series. They won three races and clinched the championship title. But in the Endurance Series, Buhk raced with M-Sport team with Andy Soucek and Maxime Soulet as his teammates. They finished the season tenth finishing in point all races but 2015 24 Hours of Spa.

In 2016, Baumann returned as Buhk's teammate (Jazeman Jaafar was the third driver in the Endurance Cup), while HTP Motorsport bought new-for Mercedes-AMG GT3 car. Their pair overscored Rob Bell by ten points in the GT Series to take the title. While in the Endurance Cup and Sprint Cup, they were second and third, respectively, with one race win in the two championships. Also he made his debut in the 2016 24 Hours of Nürburgring race, but his squad was not able to finish the race.

For 2017, Buhk got Franck Perera as a teammate for GT Series campaign while Jimmy Eriksson was the third driver in the Endurance Cup. Buhk got his third runner-up spot in the GT Series. He and his teammates were third in both the Endurance Cup and Sprint Cup. In the Sprint cup, Buhk with Perera was more successful as they won main Misano race. He repeated 24 Hours of Nürburgring race, but once again his car haven't seen a checkered flag.

In 2018, HTP Motorsport left Blancpain GT Series in the favour of 2018 ADAC GT Masters, where Buhk is a teammate of the Indy Dontje. While in 2018 Blancpain GT Series Endurance Cup he joined Götz and Álvaro Parente at Strakka Racing.

After the 2022 DTM season, Buhk announced his retirement from racing, citing "shifting priorities".

== Racing record ==
=== Career summary ===
Season	Series	Team	Races	Wins	Poles	F/Laps	Podiums	Points	Position
2010	ADAC Formel Masters	KUG Motorsport	21	0	0	0	0	34	12th
2011	ADAC Formel Masters	KUG Motorsport	24	0	0	1	2	87	9th
2011	ADAC Formel Masters	ma-con	24	0	0	1	2	87	9th
2012	FIA GT3 European Championship	Heico Gravity-Charouz Team	12	6	5	2	8	214	**1st**
2012	ADAC GT Masters	Heico Junior Team	16	0	0	0	0	72	11th
2013	Blancpain Endurance Series - Pro	HTP Motorsport	3	2	0	0	2	81	**1st**
2013	ADAC GT Masters	Polarweiss Racing	16	1	1	0	6	165	**3rd**
2013	FIA GT Series - Pro	HTP Gravity Charouz	10	1	0	1	4	70	7th
2014	Blancpain GT Series	HTP Motorsport	16	3	0	2	8	190	**2nd**
2014	Blancpain Sprint Series - Pro	HTP Motorsport	12	3	0	2	7	126	**2nd**
2014	Blancpain Endurance Series - Pro	HTP Motorsport	4	0	0	0	1	64	4th
2014	ADAC GT Masters	HTP Motorsport	10	2	0	0	4	90	10th
2015	Blancpain GT Series	HTP Motorsport	17	4	1	1	8	166	**2nd**
2015	Blancpain GT Series	Bentley Team M-Sport	17	4	1	1	8	166	**2nd**
2015	Blancpain Sprint Series - Pro	Bentley Team HTP	12	4	1	1	8	135	**1st**
2015	ADAC GT Masters	Bentley Team HTP	2	0	0	0	0	12	32nd
2015	Blancpain Endurance Series - Pro	Bentley Team M-Sport	5	0	0	0	0	31	10th
2016	Blancpain GT Series	HTP Motorsport	15	2	1	0	4	134	**1st**
2016	Blancpain GT Series Endurance Cup	HTP Motorsport	5	1	1	0	2	67	**2nd**
2016	Blancpain GT Series Sprint Cup	HTP Motorsport	10	1	0	0	2	67	**3rd**
2016	24 Hours of Nürburgring - SP9	HTP Motorsport	1	0	0	0	0	N/A	DNF
2016	24H Series - A6	HTP Motorsport							
2017	Blancpain GT Series	Mercedes-AMG Team HTP Motorsport	15	3	3	0	3	120	**2nd**
2017	Blancpain GT Series Sprint Cup	Mercedes-AMG Team HTP Motorsport	10	3	3	0	1	68	**3rd**
2017	Blancpain GT Series Endurance Cup	Mercedes-AMG Team HTP Motorsport	5	0	0	0	2	52	**3rd**
2017	ADAC GT Masters	Mercedes-AMG Team HTP Motorsport	1	0	0	0	0	6	35th
2017	Intercontinental GT Challenge	Mercedes-AMG Team HTP Motorsport	1	0	0	0	0	0	NC
2017	24 Hours of Nürburgring - SP9	Mercedes-AMG Team HTP Motorsport	1	0	0	0	0	N/A	DNF
2017	Blancpain GT Series Asia - GT3	GruppeM Racing Team	8	2	0	3	4	100	4th
2018	Intercontinental GT Challenge	Mercedes-AMG Team Strakka Racing	4	0	0	0	1	31	9th
2018	Blancpain GT Series Endurance Cup	Mercedes-AMG Team Strakka Racing	5	0	0	0	1	24	19th
2018	ADAC GT Masters	Mann-Filter Team HTP	14	1	0	0	2	84	5th
2018	IMSA SportsCar Championship - GTD	P1 Motorsports	1	0	0	0	0	24	59th
2019	Intercontinental GT Challenge	Mercedes-AMG Team GruppeM Racing	5	0	1	1	2	58	**3rd**
2019	Blancpain GT Series Endurance Cup	Mercedes-AMG Team GruppeM Racing	1	0	0	0	0	10	22nd
2019	IMSA SportsCar Championship - GTD	P1 Motorsports	2	0	0	0	0	32	46th
2019	Blancpain GT World Challenge America - Pro-Am	P1 Motorsports	2	0	1	0	0	20	12th
2019	24H GT Series - SP4	Mercedes-AMG Team Driving Academy							
2019	24 Hours of Nürburgring - SP9	Mercedes-AMG Team Black Falcon	1	0	0	0	1	N/A	**2nd**
2020	24H GT Series - GT3	HTP Winward Motorsport							
2020	GT World Challenge Europe Endurance Cup	Getspeed Performance	2	0	0	0	0	6	21st
2020	GT World Challenge Europe Endurance Cup	AKKA ASP	1	0	0	0	0	6	21st
2020	Intercontinental GT Challenge	Mercedes-AMG Team GruppeM Racing	1	0	0	0	0	10	16th
2020	24 Hours of Nürburgring - SP9	Mercedes-AMG Team Getspeed	1	0	0	0	0	N/A	DNF
2021	Deutsche Tourenwagen Masters	Mercedes-AMG Team Mücke Motorsport	14	0	0	0	1	28	15th
2021	ADAC GT Masters	Mann-Filter Team Landgraf-HTP WWR	14	1	1	0	4	150	4th
2021	IMSA SportsCar Championship - GTD	Alegra Motorsports	2	0	0	0	0	237	57th
2021	GT World Challenge Europe Endurance Cup	HubAuto	1	0	0	0	0	0	NC
2021	Intercontinental GT Challenge	HubAuto	1	0	0	0	0	0	NC
2022	Deutsche Tourenwagen Masters	Mercedes-AMG Team Mücke Motorsport	16	0	0	0	0	1	25th
2022	GT World Challenge Europe Endurance Cup	Mercedes-AMG GruppeM Racing	1	0	0	0	0	13	23rd
2022	Intercontinental GT Challenge	Mercedes-AMG GruppeM Racing	1	0	0	0	0	12	16th
2022	IMSA SportsCar Championship - GTD Pro	WeatherTech Racing	1	0	0	0	0	275	29th

=== Complete ADAC Formel Masters results ===
(key) (Races in bold indicate pole position; races in italics indicate fastest lap)

Year	Team	1	2	3	4	5	6	7	8	9	10	11	12	13	14	15	16	17	18	19	20	21	22	23	24	DC	Points
2010	KUG Motorsport	OSC; 1; 9	OSC; 2; 10	OSC; 3; 11	SAC; 1; 10	SAC; 2; 8	SAC; 3 Ret	HOC; 1; 11	HOC; 2; 15	HOC; 3; 9	ASS; 1; 8	ASS; 2 Ret	ASS; 3; 9	LAU; 1; 6	LAU; 2; 5	LAU; 3 Ret	NÜR; 1 Ret	NÜR; 2; 8	NÜR; 3; 14	OSC; 1; 9	OSC; 2; 13	OSC; 3; 10				12th	34
2011	KUG Motorsport	OSC; 1; 7	OSC; 2; 6	OSC; 3; 7	SAC; 1; 21	SAC; 2 Ret	SAC; 3; 19	ZOL; 1 Ret	ZOL; 2; 9	ZOL; 3; 4	NÜR; 1; 11	NÜR; 2; 15	NÜR; 3; 17	RBR; 1; 12	RBR; 2 Ret	RBR; 3; 12										9th	87
2011	ma-con Motorsport																LAU; 1; 2	LAU; 2; 6	LAU; 3; 9	ASS; 1; 17	ASS; 2; 5	ASS; 3; 3	HOC; 1 Ret	HOC; 2 Ret	HOC; 3; 14	9th	87

=== Complete FIA GT3 European Championship results ===
(key) (Races in bold indicate pole position; races in italics indicate fastest lap)

Year	Entrant	Chassis	Engine	1	2	3	4	5	6	7	8	9	10	11	12	Pos.	Points
2012	Heico Gravity-Charouz Team	Mercedes-Benz SLS AMG GT3	Mercedes-AMG M159 6.2 L V8	NOG; 1; 3	NOG; 2; 1	ZOL; 1; 5	ZOL; 2; 3	NAV; 1; 8	NAV; 2; 1	ALG; 1; 1	ALG; 2; 5	MSC; 1; 1	MSC; 2; 5	NUR; 1; 1	NUR; 2; 1	1st	214

=== Complete ADAC GT Masters results ===
(key) (Races in bold indicate pole position; races in italics indicate fastest lap)

Year	Team	Car	1	2	3	4	5	6	7	8	9	10	11	12	13	14	15	16	Pos.	Points
2012	HEICO Junior Team	Mercedes-Benz SLS AMG GT3	OSC; 1; 20	OSC; 2; 5	ZAN; 1; 13	ZAN; 2; 9	SAC; 1; 7	SAC; 2; 12	NÜR; 1; 9	NÜR; 2; 8	RBR; 1 Ret	RBR; 2; 9	LAU; 1; 6	LAU; 2; 5	NÜR; 1; 5	NÜR; 2; 5	HOC; 1; 24	HOC; 2; 6	11th	72
2013	Polarweiss Racing	Mercedes-Benz SLS AMG GT3	**OSC**; **1**; 11	**OSC**; **2**; 9	SPA; 1; 2	SPA; 2; 2	SAC; 1; 5	SAC; 2; 10	NÜR; 1; 1	NÜR; 2 Ret	RBR; 1; 5	RBR; 2; 2	LAU; 1; 7	LAU; 2; 4	SVK; 1; 4	SVK; 2; 3	HOC; 1; 2	HOC; 2 Ret	3rd	165
2014	HTP Motorsport	Mercedes-Benz SLS AMG GT3	OSC; 1; 1	OSC; 2 Ret	ZAN; 1; 9	ZAN; 2; 6	LAU; 1; 1	LAU; 2; 16	RBR; 1; 3	RBR; 2; 3	SLO; 1; 21	SLO; 2; 19†	NÜR; 1	NÜR; 2	SAC; 1	SAC; 2	HOC; 1	HOC; 2	10th	90
2015	Bentley Team HTP	Bentley Continental GT3	OSC; 1	OSC; 2	RBR; 1	RBR; 2	SPA; 1	SPA; 2	LAU; 1	LAU; 2	NÜR; 1	NÜR; 2	SAC; 1 Ret	SAC; 2; 4	ZAN; 1	ZAN; 2	HOC; 1	HOC; 2	32nd	14
2017	Mercedes-AMG Team HTP Motorsport	Mercedes-AMG GT3	OSC; 1	OSC; 2	LAU; 1	LAU; 2	RBR; 1	RBR; 2	ZAN; 1	ZAN; 2	NÜR; 1	NÜR; 2; 7	SAC; 1	SAC; 2	HOC; 1	HOC; 2			35th	6
2018	Mann-Filter Team HTP	Mercedes-AMG GT3	OSC; 1; 6	OSC; 2; 27	MST; 1; 4	MST; 2; 16	RBR; 1; 9	RBR; 2; 16	NÜR; 1; 1	NÜR; 2; 17	ZAN; 1; 26	ZAN; 2; 5	SAC; 1; 4	SAC; 2; 22	HOC; 1; 15	HOC; 2; 3			5th	84
2021	Mann-Filter Team Landgraf-HTP WWR	Mercedes-AMG GT3 Evo	**OSC**; **1**; 1^{1}	OSC; 2 Ret	RBR; 1; 4	RBR; 2; 10	ZAN; 1; 9	ZAN; 2; 2	LAU; 1; 4	LAU; 2; 3	SAC; 1; 4	SAC; 2 Ret	HOC; 1; 20	HOC; 2; 2	NÜR; 1; 5	NÜR; 2; 19			4th	150

=== Complete GT World Challenge Europe results ===
==== GT World Challenge Europe Endurance Cup ====
(key) (Races in bold indicate pole position; races in italics indicate fastest lap)

Year	Team	Car	Class	1	2	3	4	5	6	7	Pos.	Points
2013	HTP Motorsport	Mercedes-Benz SLS AMG GT3	Pro	MNZ	SIL	LEC; 5	SPA; 6H; 4	SPA; 12H; 3	SPA; 24H; 1	NÜR; 1	1st	81
2014	HTP Motorsport	Mercedes-Benz SLS AMG GT3	Pro	MNZ; 5	SIL	LEC; 4	SPA; 6H; 6	SPA; 12H; 6	SPA; 24H; 5	NÜR; 2	4th	64
2015	Bentley M-Sport	Bentley Continental GT3	Pro	MNZ; 13	SIL; 6	LEC; 12	SPA; 6H; 10	SPA; 12H; 4	SPA; 24H; Ret	NÜR; 5	10th	31
2016	HTP Motorsport	Mercedes-AMG GT3	Pro	**MNZ**; 2	SIL; 1	LEC; Ret					2nd	67
2016	AMG - Team HTP Motorsport	Mercedes-AMG GT3	Pro				SPA; 6H; 13	SPA; 12H; 7	SPA; 24H; 6	NÜR; 4	2nd	67
2017	Mercedes-AMG Team HTP Motorsport	Mercedes-AMG GT3	Pro	MNZ; 3	SIL; 2	LEC; 40	SPA; 6H; 3	SPA; 12H; 52	SPA; 24H; Ret	CAT; 4	3rd	52
2018	Strakka Racing	Mercedes-AMG GT3	Pro	MNZ; 2	SIL; 8	LEC; 9					19th	24
2018	Mercedes-AMG Team Strakka Racing	Mercedes-AMG GT3	Pro				SPA; 6H; 22	SPA; 12H; 12	SPA; 24H; 11	CAT; 17	19th	24
2019	Mercedes-AMG Team GruppeM Racing	Mercedes-AMG GT3	Pro	MNZ	SIL	LEC	SPA; 6H; 13	SPA; 12H; 2	SPA; 24H; 10	CAT	22nd	10
2020	GetSpeed Performance	Mercedes-AMG GT3 Evo	Pro	IMO; 39	NÜR; 7	SPA; 6H	SPA; 12H	SPA; 24H			21st	6
2020	AKKA ASP	Mercedes-AMG GT3 Evo	Pro						LEC; 18		21st	6
2021	HubAuto Racing	Mercedes-AMG GT3 Evo	Pro	MNZ	LEC	SPA; 6H; 12	SPA; 12H; 45	SPA; 24H; 37	NÜR	CAT	NC	0
2022	AMG Team GruppeM Racing	Mercedes-AMG GT3 Evo	Pro	IMO	LEC	SPA; 6H; 10	SPA; 12H; 9	SPA; 24H; 4	HOC	CAT	23rd	13

==== GT World Challenge Europe Sprint Cup ====
(key) (Races in bold indicate pole position; races in italics indicate fastest lap)

Year	Team	Car	Class	1	2	3	4	5	6	7	8	9	10	11	12	13	14	Pos.	Points
2013	HTP Gravity Charouz	Mercedes-Benz SLS AMG GT3	Pro	NOG; QR; 3	NOG; CR; 3	ZOL; QR; 7	ZOL; CR; Ret	ZAN; QR; 2	ZAN; CR; 1	SVK; QR; 10	SVK; CR; Ret	NAV; QR	NAV; CR	BAK; QR; 12	BAK; CR; 4			7th	70
2014	HTP Motorsport	Mercedes-Benz SLS AMG GT3	Pro	NOG; QR; 5	NOG; CR; 1	BRH; QR; 2	BRH; CR; 2	ZAN; QR; 2	ZAN; CR; 4	SVK; QR	SVK; CR	ALG; QR; 2	ALG; CR; 1	ZOL; QR; 6	ZOL; CR; 1	BAK; QR; 9	BAK; CR; Ret	2nd	126
2015	Bentley Team HTP	Bentley Continental GT3	Pro	NOG; QR; 8	NOG; CR; 4	BRH; QR; DNS	BRH; CR; DNS	ZOL; QR; 3	ZOL; CR; 2	MOS; QR; 3	MOS; CR; 1	ALG; QR; 1	ALG; CR; 4	MIS; QR; 7	MIS; CR; 2	**ZAN**; **QR**; 1	ZAN; CR; 1	1st	135
2016	HTP Motorsport	Mercedes-AMG GT3	Pro	MIS; QR; 5	MIS; CR; 2	BRH; QR; 18	BRH; CR; 7	NÜR; QR; 10	NÜR; CR; 6									3rd	67
2016	AMG - Team HTP Motorsport	Mercedes-AMG GT3	Pro							HUN; QR; 4	HUN; CR; 1	CAT; QR; 6	CAT; CR; 8					3rd	67
2017	Mercedes-AMG Team HTP Motorsport	Mercedes-AMG GT3	Pro	MIS; QR; 1	MIS; CR; 1	BRH; QR; 23	BRH; CR; 6	ZOL; QR; 16	ZOL; CR; 6	HUN; QR; 4	HUN; CR; 6	NÜR; QR; 1	NÜR; CR; Ret					3rd	68

=== Complete IMSA SportsCar Championship results ===
(key) (Races in bold indicate pole position; results in italics indicate fastest lap)

Year	Team	Class	Make	Engine	1	2	3	4	5	6	7	8	9	10	11	12	Pos.	Points
2018	P1 Motorsports	GTD	Mercedes-AMG GT3	Mercedes-AMG M159 6.2 L V8	DAY	SEB	MOH	BEL	WGL	MOS	LIM	ELK	VIR	LGA	PET; 7		59th	24
2019	P1 Motorsports	GTD	Mercedes-AMG GT3	Mercedes-AMG M159 6.2 L V8	DAY; 19	SEB; 11	MDO	DET	WGL	MOS	LIM	ELK	VIR	LGA	PET		46th	32
2021	Alegra Motorsports	GTD	Mercedes-AMG GT3 Evo	Mercedes-AMG M159 6.2 L V8	DAY; 9	SEB	MDO	DET	WGL	WGL	LIM	ELK	LGA	LBH	VIR	PET	57th	237
2022	WeatherTech Racing	GTD Pro	Mercedes-AMG GT3 Evo	Mercedes-AMG M159 6.2 L V8	DAY	SEB	LBH	LGA	WGL	MOS	LIM	ELK	VIR	PET; 6			29th	275

=== Complete Deutsche Tourenwagen Masters results ===
(key) (Races in bold indicate pole position) (Races in italics indicate fastest lap)

Year	Team	Car	1	2	3	4	5	6	7	8	9	10	11	12	13	14	15	16	Pos.	Points
2021	Mercedes-AMG Team Mücke Motorsport	Mercedes-AMG GT3 Evo	MNZ; 1; 6	MNZ; 2; 12	LAU; 1; 10	LAU; 2; 18	ZOL; 1 Ret	ZOL; 2; 11	NÜR; 1 Ret	NÜR; 2 Ret	RBR; 1; 12	RBR; 2; 9	ASS; 1 Ret	ASS; 2; 15	HOC; 1	HOC; 2	NOR; 1; 9	NOR; 2; 3	15th	28
2022	Mercedes-AMG Team Mücke Motorsport	Mercedes-AMG GT3 Evo	ALG; 1; 19	ALG; 2; 17	LAU; 1; 11	LAU; 2; 22	IMO; 1; 18	IMO; 2 Ret	NOR; 1 Ret	NOR; 2 Ret	NÜR; 1; 11	NÜR; 2; 13	SPA; 1; 16	SPA; 2; 21	RBR; 1; 17	RBR; 2; 14	HOC; 1; 10	HOC; 2 Ret	25th	1

Sporting positions
Preceded by Francesco Castellacci; Federico Leo	FIA GT3 European Champion; 2012; With: Dominik Baumann	Succeeded by Championship merged into the FIA GT Series
Preceded by Christopher Haase; Christopher Mies; Stéphane Ortelli	Blancpain Endurance Series Champion; 2013	Succeeded by Laurens Vanthoor
Preceded by Maximilian Götz	Blancpain Sprint Series Champion; 2015; With: Vincent Abril	Succeeded by Enzo Ide
Preceded by Robin Frijns	Blancpain GT Series Champion; 2016; With: Dominik Baumann	Succeeded by Mirko Bortolotti; Christian Engelhart
