= 2012 FIA GT3 European Championship =

Seasons
- ← 2011 2013 (FIA GT) →

The 2012 FIA GT3 European Championship was the seventh and final season of the FIA GT3 European Championship. The season commenced on 8 April at Nogaro and ended on 23 September at the Nürburgring. The season featured six double-header rounds, with each race lasting for a duration of 60 minutes. Most of the events were support races to the 2012 FIA GT1 World Championship; two of the six meetings were run in conjunction with the FIA GT1 World Championship, with combined grids being utilised.

== Calendar ==
On 2 April 2012, the SRO announced the final calendar for 2012.

Round	Circuit	Date
1	Circuit Paul Armagnac, Nogaro, France	8 April
2	Circuit Zolder, Zolder, Belgium	22 April
3	Circuito de Navarra, Los Arcos, Spain	27 May
4	Autódromo Internacional do Algarve, Portimão, Portugal	8 July
5	Moscow Raceway, Volokolamsky District, Russia	2 September
6	Nürburgring, Nürburg, Germany	23 September

== Entries ==
The entry list was published by the FIA on 3 April 2012. For the combined races with the FIA GT1 World Championship, GT3 cars ran with 100 in front of their usual car numbers.

Team	Chassis	Engine	No.	Com No.	Drivers	Rounds	Tyres
(Czech Republic) Heico Gravity-Charouz Team	Mercedes-Benz SLS AMG GT3	Mercedes-Benz M159 6.2 L V8	1	101	(Austria) Dominik Baumann	All	P
(Czech Republic) Heico Gravity-Charouz Team	Mercedes-Benz SLS AMG GT3	Mercedes-Benz M159 6.2 L V8	1	101	(Germany) Maximilian Buhk	All	P
(Czech Republic) Heico Gravity-Charouz Team	Mercedes-Benz SLS AMG GT3	Mercedes-Benz M159 6.2 L V8	2	102	(Finland) Mika Vähämäki	All	P
(Czech Republic) Heico Gravity-Charouz Team	Mercedes-Benz SLS AMG GT3	Mercedes-Benz M159 6.2 L V8	2	102	(Sweden) Max Nilsson	All	P
(Russia) Russian Bears Motorsport	Ferrari 458 Italia GT3	Ferrari F136F 4.5 L V8	4	104	(Russia) Sergey Ryabov	All	P
(Russia) Russian Bears Motorsport	Ferrari 458 Italia GT3	Ferrari F136F 4.5 L V8	4	104	(Spain) Miguel Toril	All	P
(Russia) Russian Bears Motorsport	Ferrari 458 Italia GT3	Ferrari F136F 4.5 L V8	5	105	(Russia) Vyacheslav Maleev	All	P
(Russia) Russian Bears Motorsport	Ferrari 458 Italia GT3	Ferrari F136F 4.5 L V8	5	105	(Russia) Kirill Ladygin	All	P
Valmon Racing Team Russia	Aston Martin DBRS9	Aston Martin AM04 6.0 L V12	6	N/A	(United Kingdom) Tom Kimber-Smith	1	P
Valmon Racing Team Russia	Aston Martin DBRS9	Aston Martin AM04 6.0 L V12	6	N/A	(Russia) Natalia Freidina	1	P
(Germany) Rhino's Leipert Motorsport	Lamborghini Gallardo LP600+ GT3	Lamborghini CEH 5.2 L V10	11	111	(Slovakia) Filip Sladecka	1	P
(Germany) Rhino's Leipert Motorsport	Lamborghini Gallardo LP600+ GT3	Lamborghini CEH 5.2 L V10	11	111	(Austria) Gerhard Tweraser	1	P
(Germany) Rhino's Leipert Motorsport	Lamborghini Gallardo LP600+ GT3	Lamborghini CEH 5.2 L V10	11	111	(Austria) Hari Proczyk	2–6	P
(Germany) Rhino's Leipert Motorsport	Lamborghini Gallardo LP600+ GT3	Lamborghini CEH 5.2 L V10	11	111	(Germany) David Mengesdorf	2–6	P
(Germany) Rhino's Leipert Motorsport	Lamborghini Gallardo LP600+ GT3	Lamborghini CEH 5.2 L V10	12	112	(Finland) Jesse Laine	1	P
(Germany) Rhino's Leipert Motorsport	Lamborghini Gallardo LP600+ GT3	Lamborghini CEH 5.2 L V10	12	112	(France) Gilles Vannelet	1	P
(Germany) Rhino's Leipert Motorsport	Lamborghini Gallardo LP600+ GT3	Lamborghini CEH 5.2 L V10	12	112	(Russia) Natalia Freidina	2	P
(Germany) Rhino's Leipert Motorsport	Lamborghini Gallardo LP600+ GT3	Lamborghini CEH 5.2 L V10	12	112	(Russia) Leonid Machitski	2	P
(Germany) Rhino's Leipert Motorsport	Lamborghini Gallardo LP600+ GT3	Lamborghini CEH 5.2 L V10	12	112	(Russia) Eduard Leganov	4–6	P
(Germany) Rhino's Leipert Motorsport	Lamborghini Gallardo LP600+ GT3	Lamborghini CEH 5.2 L V10	12	112	(Germany) Riccardo Brutschin	4	P
(Germany) Rhino's Leipert Motorsport	Lamborghini Gallardo LP600+ GT3	Lamborghini CEH 5.2 L V10	12	112	(Russia) Sergey Afanasyev	5	P
(Germany) Rhino's Leipert Motorsport	Lamborghini Gallardo LP600+ GT3	Lamborghini CEH 5.2 L V10	12	112	(Finland) Marko Vähämäki	6	P
(Portugal) Team Novadriver	Audi R8 LMS	Audi CJJ 5.2 L V10	14	114	(Portugal) Ni Amorim	All	P
(Portugal) Team Novadriver	Audi R8 LMS	Audi CJJ 5.2 L V10	14	114	(Portugal) César Campaniço	All	P
(Portugal) Team Novadriver	Audi R8 LMS	Audi CJJ 5.2 L V10	N/A	117	(Russia) Natalia Freidina	6	P
(Portugal) Team Novadriver	Audi R8 LMS	Audi CJJ 5.2 L V10	N/A	117	(Russia) Alexey Vasilyev	6	P
(France) Saintéloc Racing	Audi R8 LMS	Audi CJJ 5.2 L V10	15	115	(France) Jérôme Demay	1–3, 6	P
(France) Saintéloc Racing	Audi R8 LMS	Audi CJJ 5.2 L V10	15	115	(France) Dino Lunardi	1–3, 6	P
(France) Saintéloc Racing	Audi R8 LMS	Audi CJJ 5.2 L V10	16	N/A	(France) Grégory Guilvert	1–2, 4	P
(France) Saintéloc Racing	Audi R8 LMS	Audi CJJ 5.2 L V10	16	N/A	(France) Marc Sourd	1–4	P
(France) Saintéloc Racing	Audi R8 LMS	Audi CJJ 5.2 L V10	16	N/A	(Switzerland) Jonathan Hirschi	3	P
(Germany) Reiter Engineering	Lamborghini Gallardo LP600+ GT3	Lamborghini CEH 5.2 L V10	24	N/A	(Russia) Natalia Freidina	4	P
(Germany) Reiter Engineering	Lamborghini Gallardo LP600+ GT3	Lamborghini CEH 5.2 L V10	24	N/A	(Germany) Albert von Thurn und Taxis	4	P
(Germany) Reiter Engineering	Chevrolet Camaro GT	Chevrolet LS3 7.9 L V8	34	N/A	(Germany) Max Sandritter	2	P
(Germany) Reiter Engineering	Chevrolet Camaro GT	Chevrolet LS3 7.9 L V8	34	N/A	(Germany) Philip Geipel	2	P
(Belgium) Belgian Audi Club Team WRT	Audi R8 LMS	Audi CJJ 5.2 L V10	32	N/A	(Belgium) Yves Weerts	3	P
(Belgium) Belgian Audi Club Team WRT	Audi R8 LMS	Audi CJJ 5.2 L V10	32	N/A	(Belgium) Kurt Mollekens	3	P
(Italy) AF Corse	Ferrari 458 Italia GT3	Ferrari F136F 4.5 L V8	50	150	(Venezuela) Gaetano Ardagna Pérez	All	P
(Italy) AF Corse	Ferrari 458 Italia GT3	Ferrari F136F 4.5 L V8	50	150	(Italy) Giuseppe Cirò	All	P
(Italy) AF Corse	Ferrari 458 Italia GT3	Ferrari F136F 4.5 L V8	51	151	(Italy) Stefano Gai	All	P
(Italy) AF Corse	Ferrari 458 Italia GT3	Ferrari F136F 4.5 L V8	51	151	(United Kingdom) Michael Lyons	All	P
(Russia) Esta Motorsports	Ferrari 458 Italia GT3	Ferrari F136F 4.5 L V8	N/A	177	(Russia) Aleksander Skryabin	5	P
(Russia) Esta Motorsports	Ferrari 458 Italia GT3	Ferrari F136F 4.5 L V8	N/A	177	(Italy) Alessandro Pier Guidi	5	P
(Russia) Esta Motorsports	Ferrari 458 Italia GT3	Ferrari F136F 4.5 L V8	N/A	199	(Russia) Aleksey Basov	5	P
(Russia) Esta Motorsports	Ferrari 458 Italia GT3	Ferrari F136F 4.5 L V8	N/A	199	(Germany) Björn Grossmann	5	P

== Results and standings ==
=== Race results ===
Rnd.	Race	Circuit	Pole position	Fastest lap	Winner
1	R1	Nogaro	(Czech Republic) No. 1 Heico Gravity-Charouz Team	(Germany) No. 12 Rhino's Leipert Motorsport	(France) No. 16 Saintéloc Racing
1	R1	Nogaro	(Austria) Dominik Baumann (Germany) Maximilian Buhk	(France) Gilles Vannelet (Finland) Jesse Laine	(France) Marc Sourd (France) Grégory Guilvert
1	R2	Nogaro	(France) No. 16 Saintéloc Racing	(Czech Republic) No. 1 Heico Gravity-Charouz Team	(Czech Republic) No. 1 Heico Gravity-Charouz Team
1	R2	Nogaro	(France) Marc Sourd (France) Grégory Guilvert	(Austria) Dominik Baumann (Germany) Maximilian Buhk	(Austria) Dominik Baumann (Germany) Maximilian Buhk
2	R1	Zolder	(Portugal) No. 14 Team Novadriver	(Italy) No. 50 AF Corse	(Italy) No. 50 AF Corse
2	R1	Zolder	(Portugal) Ni Amorim (Portugal) César Campaniço	(Venezuela) Gaetano Ardagna Pérez (Italy) Giuseppe Cirò	(Venezuela) Gaetano Ardagna Pérez (Italy) Giuseppe Cirò
2	R2	Zolder	(France) No. 15 Saintéloc Racing	(Czech Republic) No. 1 Heico Gravity-Charouz Team	(Italy) No. 50 AF Corse
2	R2	Zolder	(France) Jérôme Demay (France) Dino Lunardi	(Austria) Dominik Baumann (Germany) Maximilian Buhk	(Venezuela) Gaetano Ardagna Pérez (Italy) Giuseppe Cirò
3	R1	Navarra	(Germany) No. 11 Rhino's Leipert Motorsport	(France) No. 15 Saintéloc Racing	(Czech Republic) No. 2 Heico Gravity-Charouz Team
3	R1	Navarra	(Germany) David Mengesdorf (Austria) Hari Proczyk	(France) Jérôme Demay (France) Dino Lunardi	(Sweden) Max Nilsson (Finland) Mika Vähämäki
3	R2	Navarra	(Czech Republic) No. 1 Heico Gravity-Charouz Team	(Czech Republic) No. 1 Heico Gravity-Charouz Team	(Czech Republic) No. 1 Heico Gravity-Charouz Team
3	R2	Navarra	(Austria) Dominik Baumann (Germany) Maximilian Buhk	(Austria) Dominik Baumann (Germany) Maximilian Buhk	(Austria) Dominik Baumann (Germany) Maximilian Buhk
4	R1	Algarve	(Czech Republic) No. 1 Heico Gravity-Charouz Team	(Czech Republic) No. 1 Heico Gravity-Charouz Team	(Czech Republic) No. 1 Heico Gravity-Charouz Team
4	R1	Algarve	(Austria) Dominik Baumann (Germany) Maximilian Buhk	(Austria) Dominik Baumann (Germany) Maximilian Buhk	(Austria) Dominik Baumann (Germany) Maximilian Buhk
4	R2	Algarve	(Czech Republic) No. 1 Heico Gravity-Charouz Team	(Czech Republic) No. 1 Heico Gravity-Charouz Team	(Germany) No. 11 Rhino's Leipert Motorsport
4	R2	Algarve	(Austria) Dominik Baumann (Germany) Maximilian Buhk	(Austria) Dominik Baumann (Germany) Maximilian Buhk	(Germany) David Mengesdorf (Austria) Hari Proczyk
5	R1	Moscow	(Czech Republic) No. 101 Heico Gravity-Charouz Team	(Czech Republic) No. 101 Heico Gravity-Charouz Team	(Czech Republic) No. 101 Heico Gravity-Charouz Team
5	R1	Moscow	(Austria) Dominik Baumann (Germany) Maximilian Buhk	(Austria) Dominik Baumann (Germany) Maximilian Buhk	(Austria) Dominik Baumann (Germany) Maximilian Buhk
5	R2	Moscow	(Czech Republic) No. 101 Heico Gravity-Charouz Team	(Russia) No. 104 Russian Bears Motorsport	(Portugal) No. 114 Team Novadriver
5	R2	Moscow	(Austria) Dominik Baumann (Germany) Maximilian Buhk	(Russia) Sergey Ryabov (Spain) Miguel Toril	(Portugal) Ni Amorim (Portugal) César Campaniço
6	R1	Nürburgring	(Czech Republic) No. 101 Heico Gravity-Charouz Team	(Czech Republic) No. 101 Heico Gravity-Charouz Team	(Czech Republic) No. 101 Heico Gravity-Charouz Team
6	R1	Nürburgring	(Austria) Dominik Baumann (Germany) Maximilian Buhk	(Austria) Dominik Baumann (Germany) Maximilian Buhk	(Austria) Dominik Baumann (Germany) Maximilian Buhk
6	R2	Nürburgring	(Czech Republic) No. 101 Heico Gravity-Charouz Team	(Czech Republic) No. 101 Heico Gravity-Charouz Team	(Czech Republic) No. 101 Heico Gravity-Charouz Team
6	R2	Nürburgring	(Austria) Dominik Baumann (Germany) Maximilian Buhk	(Austria) Dominik Baumann (Germany) Maximilian Buhk	(Austria) Dominik Baumann (Germany) Maximilian Buhk

=== Championships ===
Championship points will be awarded to the first ten positions in each race. Entries must complete 75% of the winning car's race distance in order to be classified and earn points. Individual drivers are required to participate for a minimum of 25 minutes in order to earn championship points in any race.

Points System
Race Type	Position									
Race Type	1st	2nd	3rd	4th	5th	6th	7th	8th	9th	10th
Championship Race	25	18	15	12	10	8	6	4	2	1

==== Drivers' Championship ====
Pos.	Driver	Team	NOG (France)		ZOL (Belgium)		NAV (Spain)		ALG (Portugal)		MOS (Russia)		NÜR (Germany)		Total
Pos.	Driver	Team	R1	R2	R1	R2	R1	R2	R1	R2	R1	R2	R1	R2	Total
1	(Austria) Dominik Baumann	(Czech Republic) Heico Gravity-Charouz Team	3	1	5	3	8	1	1	5	1	5	1	1	214
1	(Germany) Maximilian Buhk	(Czech Republic) Heico Gravity-Charouz Team	3	1	5	3	8	1	1	5	1	5	1	1	214
2	(Italy) Stefano Gai	(Italy) AF Corse	2	3	3	5	2	6	4	4	6	4	2	4	158
2	(United Kingdom) Michael Lyons	(Italy) AF Corse	2	3	3	5	2	6	4	4	6	4	2	4	158
3	(Germany) David Mengesdorf	(Germany) Rhino's Leipert Motorsport			2	2	3	2	3	1	2	Ret	6	2	153
3	(Austria) Hari Proczyk	(Germany) Rhino's Leipert Motorsport			2	2	3	2	3	1	2	Ret	6	2	153
4	(Portugal) Ni Amorim	(Portugal) Team Novadriver	7	7	6	8	4	3	5	2	5	1	7	3	135
4	(Portugal) César Campaniço	(Portugal) Team Novadriver	7	7	6	8	4	3	5	2	5	1	7	3	135
5	(Venezuela) Gaetano Ardagna Pérez	(Italy) AF Corse	10	2	1	1	6	4	7	3	3	Ret	Ret	DSQ	125
5	(Italy) Giuseppe Cirò	(Italy) AF Corse	10	2	1	1	6	4	7	3	3	Ret	Ret	DSQ	125
6	(Finland) Mika Vähämäki	(Czech Republic) Heico Gravity-Charouz Team	6	5	4	9	1	5	2	10	Ret	7	3	8	111
6	(Sweden) Max Nilsson	(Czech Republic) Heico Gravity-Charouz Team	6	5	4	9	1	5	2	10	Ret	7	3	8	111
7	(France) Marc Sourd	(France) Saintéloc Racing	1	4	10	7	10	8	6	7					63
8	(France) Grégory Guilvert	(France) Saintéloc Racing	1	4	10	7			6	7					58
9	(France) Dino Lunardi	(France) Saintéloc Racing	5	6	Ret	6	5	9					5	5	58
9	(France) Jérôme Demay	(France) Saintéloc Racing	5	6	Ret	6	5	9					5	5	58
10	(Russia) Sergey Ryabov	(Russia) Russian Bears Motorsport	8	10	7	11	7	7	8	6	7	8	9	7	53
10	(Spain) Miguel Toril	(Russia) Russian Bears Motorsport	8	10	7	11	7	7	8	6	7	8	9	7	53
11	(Russia) Vyacheslav Maleev	(Russia) Russian Bears Motorsport	9	12	8	4	DNS	DNS	9	8	10	Ret	4	6	45
11	(Russia) Kirill Ladygin	(Russia) Russian Bears Motorsport	9	12	8	4	DNS	DNS	9	8	10	Ret	4	6	45
12	(Italy) Alessandro Pier Guidi	(Russia) Esta Motorsports									4	3			27
12	(Russia) Aleksander Skryabin	(Russia) Esta Motorsports									4	3			27
13	(Russia) Aleksey Basov	(Russia) Esta Motorsports									9	2			20
13	(Germany) Björn Grossmann	(Russia) Esta Motorsports									9	2			20
14	(Russia) Eduard Leganov	(Germany) Rhino's Leipert Motorsport							10	9	8	6	8	Ret	19
15	(Finland) Jesse Laine	(Germany) Rhino's Leipert Motorsport	4	9											14
15	(France) Gilles Vannelet	(Germany) Rhino's Leipert Motorsport	4	9											14
16	(Russia) Sergey Afanasyev	(Germany) Rhino's Leipert Motorsport									8	6			12
17	(Russia) Natalia Freidina	Valmon Racing Team Russia	11	11											6
17	(Russia) Natalia Freidina	(Germany) Rhino's Leipert Motorsport			9	10									6
17	(Russia) Natalia Freidina	(Germany) Reiter Engineering							11	11					6
17	(Russia) Natalia Freidina	(Portugal) Team Novadriver											10	9	6
18	(Switzerland) Jonathan Hirschi	(France) Saintéloc Racing					10	8							5
19	(Finland) Marko Vähämäki	(Germany) Rhino's Leipert Motorsport											8	Ret	4
20	(Slovakia) Filip Sládečka	(Germany) Rhino's Leipert Motorsport	DSQ	8											4
20	(Austria) Gerhard Tweraser	(Germany) Rhino's Leipert Motorsport	DSQ	8											4
21	(Russia) Leonid Machitski	(Germany) Rhino's Leipert Motorsport			9	10									3
22	(Germany) Riccardo Brutschin	(Germany) Rhino's Leipert Motorsport							10	9					3
23	(Russia) Alexey Vasilyev	(Portugal) Team Novadriver											10	9	3
24	(Belgium) Kurt Mollekens	(Belgium) Belgian Audi Club Team WRT					9	Ret							2
24	(Belgium) Yves Weerts	(Belgium) Belgian Audi Club Team WRT					9	Ret							2
25	(United Kingdom) Tom Kimber-Smith	Valmon Racing Team Russia	11	11											0
26	(Germany) Albert von Thurn und Taxis	(Germany) Reiter Engineering							11	11					0
–	(Germany) Max Sandritter	(Germany) Reiter Engineering			DNS	DNS									0
–	(Germany) Philip Geipel	(Germany) Reiter Engineering			DNS	DNS									0
Pos.	Driver	Team	R1	R2	R1	R2	R1	R2	R1	R2	R1	R2	R1	R2	Total
Pos.	Driver	Team	NOG (France)		ZOL (Belgium)		NAV (Spain)		ALG (Portugal)		MOS (Russia)		NÜR (Germany)		Total

Key
Colour	Result
Gold	Race winner
Silver	2nd place
Bronze	3rd place
Green	Points finish
Blue	Non-points finish
Blue	Non-classified finish (NC)
Purple	Did not finish (Ret)
Black	Disqualified (DSQ)
Black	Excluded (EX)
White	Did not start (DNS)
White	Race cancelled (C)
White	Withdrew (WD)
Blank	Did not participate

==== Teams' Championship ====
Teams must have two cars at a race weekend in order to be eligible for scoring points in the Teams' Championship. If a team with just one car finishes in a points position, the cars of the teams that finished below get the extra points. As well as this, Esta Motorsports did not accrue points for their one-off appearance at the Moscow event, nor did Team Novadriver for their expanded two-car entry at the Nürburgring.

Pos.	Team	Manufacturer	Car	NOG (France)		ZOL (Belgium)		NAV (Spain)		ALG (Portugal)		MOS (Russia)		NÜR (Germany)		Total
Pos.	Team	Manufacturer	Car	R1	R2	R1	R2	R1	R2	R1	R2	R1	R2	R1	R2	Total
1	(Czech Republic) Heico Gravity-Charouz Team	Mercedes-Benz	1; 101	3	1	5	3	8	1	1	5	1	5	1	1	359
1	(Czech Republic) Heico Gravity-Charouz Team	Mercedes-Benz	2; 102	6	5	4	9	1	5	2	10	Ret	7	3	8	359
2	(Italy) AF Corse	Ferrari	50; 150	10	2	1	1	6	4	7	3	3	4	Ret	DSQ	328
2	(Italy) AF Corse	Ferrari	51; 151	2	3	3	5	2	6	4	4	6	Ret	2	4	328
3	(Germany) Rhino's Leipert Motorsport	Lamborghini	11; 111	DSQ	8	2	2	3	2	3	1	2	Ret	6	2	189
3	(Germany) Rhino's Leipert Motorsport	Lamborghini	12; 112	4	9	9	10			10	9	8	6	8	Ret	189
4	(Russia) Russian Bears Motorsport	Ferrari	4; 104	8	10	7	11	7	7	8	6	7	8	9	7	158
4	(Russia) Russian Bears Motorsport	Ferrari	5; 105	9	12	8	4	DNS	DNS	9	8	10	Ret	4	6	158
5	(France) Saintéloc Racing	Audi	15; 115	5	6	Ret	6	5	9					5	5	106
5	(France) Saintéloc Racing	Audi	16	1	4	10	7	10	8	6	7					106
Pos.	Team	Manufacturer	Car	R1	R2	R1	R2	R1	R2	R1	R2	R1	R2	R1	R2	Total
Pos.	Team	Manufacturer	Car	NOG (France)		ZOL (Belgium)		NAV (Spain)		ALG (Portugal)		MOS (Russia)		NÜR (Germany)		Total

Key
Colour	Result
Gold	Race winner
Silver	2nd place
Bronze	3rd place
Green	Points finish
Blue	Non-points finish
Blue	Non-classified finish (NC)
Purple	Did not finish (Ret)
Black	Disqualified (DSQ)
Black	Excluded (EX)
White	Did not start (DNS)
White	Race cancelled (C)
White	Withdrew (WD)
Blank	Did not participate
