= Daniel Abt =

German racing driver

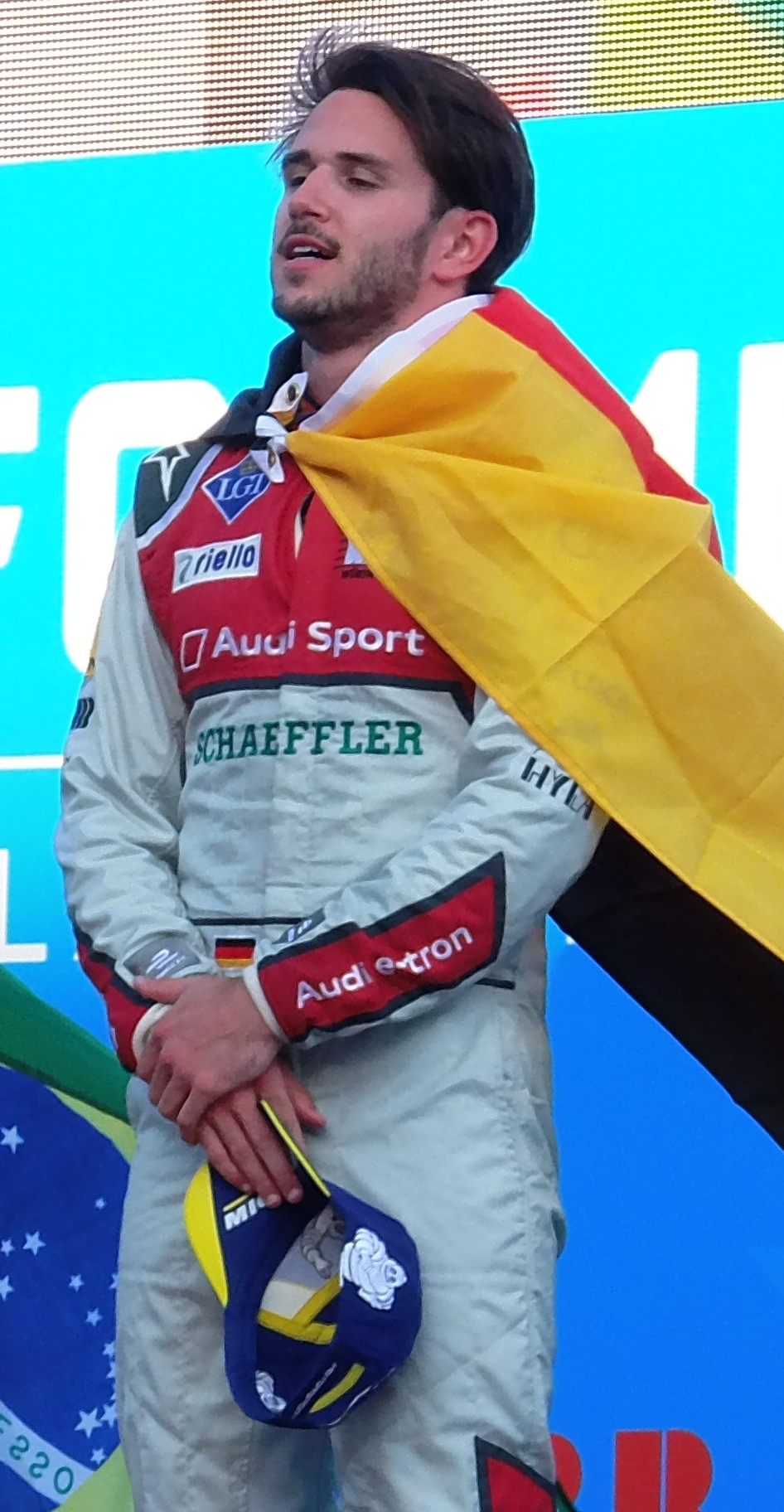
- Abt at the 2018 Berlin ePrix
- Nationality: (Germany) German
- Born: 3 December 1992 (age 33) Kempten, Germany
- Relatives: Hans-Jürgen Abt (father); Christian Abt (uncle)

Formula E career
- Debut season: 2014–15
- Categorisation: FIA Gold
- Car number: 33
- Former teams: Audi Sport ABT Schaeffler, Nio 333 FE Team
- Starts: 69
- Championships: 0
- Wins: 2
- Podiums: 10
- Poles: 2
- Fastest laps: 8
- Best finish: 5th in 2017–18
- Finished last season: 21st

Previous series
- 2013–14 2012 2011 2010 2008–09: GP2 Series; GP3 Series; Formula 3 Euro Series; German Formula Three; ADAC Formel Masters

Championship titles
- 2009: ADAC Formel Masters

Daniel Johannes Abt (born 3 December 1992) is a German former racing driver. He is most notable for competing and winning races in Formula E with the Audi Sport ABT team. Previously, Abt raced in German Formula Three, GP3, and GP2, as well as winning the 2009 ADAC Formel Masters. He is currently on a hiatus from competitive racing, having chosen to take up a broadcasting role with Sat.1 as part of their Formula E coverage.

== Career ==
=== ADAC Formel Masters ===
Abt was born in Kempten, Bavaria. In 2008, Abt switched to formula racing and competed in the ADAC Formel Masters for his father's team, Abt Sportsline. He started from the pole position four times and clinched a third and two second places as his best results. Finishing the season in eighth place of the standings, he was defeated by his team-mate Markus Pommer, who finished fifth overall with one victory to his credit. In 2009, Abt contested his second season in the ADAC Formel Masters for Abt Sportsline and with eight race wins commandingly clinched the champion's title ahead of Klaus Bachler. He took seven pole positions and a total of ten podium results. With 224 points against 90 points, he clearly prevailed in the internal duel against his team-mate René Binder.

=== Formula Three ===
After running in the German Formula Three Championship as a guest entrant for Performance Racing in 2009, Abt switched to the series in 2010 joining the championship-winning Van Amersfoort Racing team. During the season, he prevailed against his team-mates Stef Dusseldorp and Willi Steindl and had chances of winning the championship title up to the last race weekend. In the end, he had to admit defeat to Tom Dillmann with a score of 112 points against 120 points, and with two race wins and a total of ten podium places finished as the overall runner-up. After the season, he competed for Signature at the prestigious Macau Grand Prix. Abt was leading the race ahead of his team-mates Edoardo Mortara and Laurens Vanthoor but lost control of his vehicle and retired after an accident.

In 2011, Abt joined the Formula 3 Euro Series grid for Signature, finishing the season in seventh place after taking four third places as his best results. In the team, he was defeated by Marco Wittmann and Vanthoor, who achieved second and sixth place. Ahead of Carlos Muñoz, who finished in position eight of the standings, Abt was the third-best driver of his team. In addition, Abt was entitled to points in the 2011 FIA Formula 3 International Trophy where he achieved fourth place. At the end of the year, he tested for Audi in a DTM car.

=== GP3 and GP2 ===
After setting the fastest time on several occasions in GP3 tests for Lotus GP at the end of 2011, the racing team that had provided the champion and the runner-up the year before, the team gave Abt a cockpit for the 2012 GP3 Series season.

On 19 December 2012, Abt got a contract to join ART Grand Prix in the GP2 Series in 2013 together with James Calado. Abt struggled as a rookie and finished the season in 22nd with only eleven points to his name, but remained in the championship for 2014 by moving to the German Hilmer Motorsport squad alongside fellow GP3 runner-up Facu Regalia.

=== Formula E (2014–2020) ===
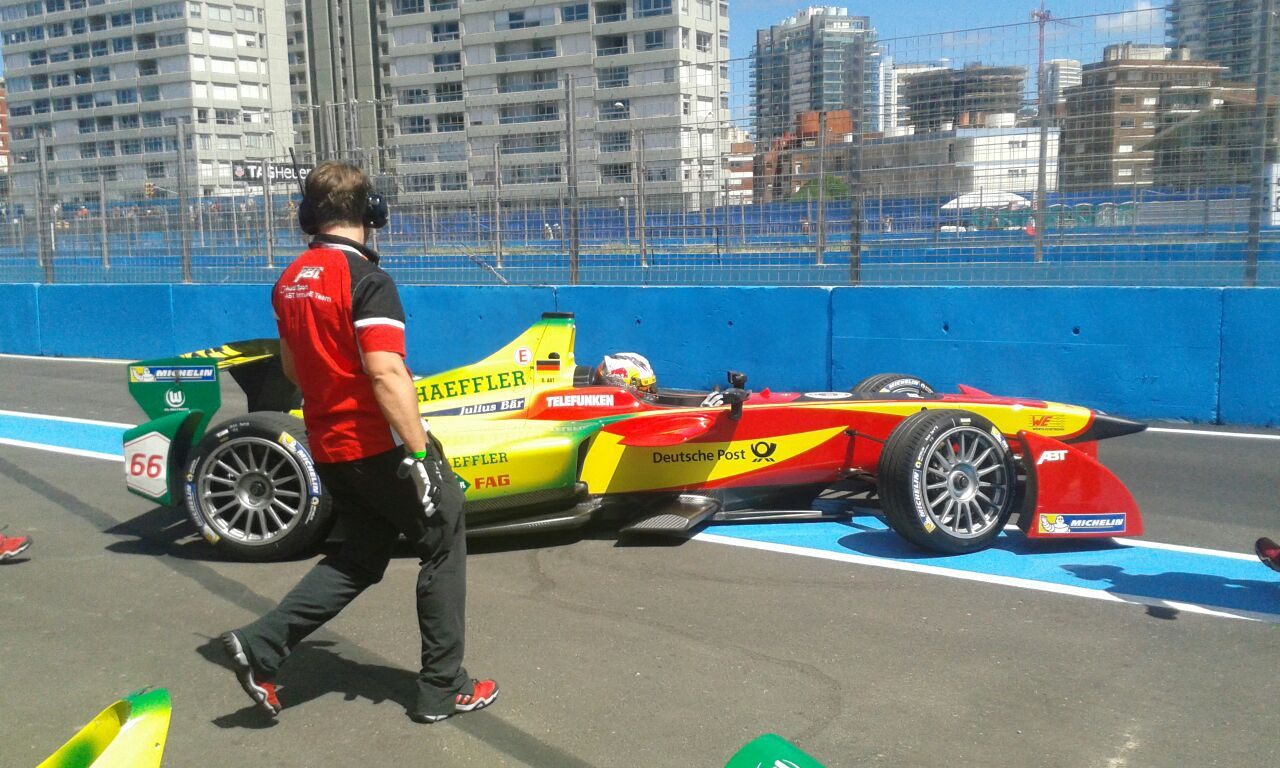
Abt driving in the 2014 Punta del Este ePrix

On 13 February 2014, Abt was confirmed to also be racing in the inaugural Formula E season with his family associated team Audi Sport ABT alongside Audi's World Endurance Championship driver Lucas di Grassi.

==== 2014–15 ====
Having driven to third on the podium in the inaugural Formula E race, Abt was penalised for illegal modifications on his car resulting being pushed down to 10th position. Abt achieved one podium finish, pole position and fastest lap in the 2014–15 season with 32 points and 11th place in the championship. Abt failed to live up to expectations in his debut season having scored 101 less than teammate Lucas di Grassi, having lacked consistency.

==== 2017–18 ====
Abt won his first race in Formula E in the 2018 Mexico City ePrix, after 38 race starts.

==== 2019–20 ====
After the Race-at-Home scandal, Abt signed for the Nio 333 FE Team, replacing Ma Qinghua as travel restrictions prevented the latter from traveling to Berlin.

=== Disqualification in Sim-Racing ===
On May 23, 2020, Abt competed as an Audi factory driver in the sim racing series "Race at Home Challenge." However, he violated the rules by allowing a professional esports player to race on his behalf. Consequently, he was disqualified, lost all the championship points he had earned so far, received a €10,000 fine which was donated to charity, and was immediately dismissed by Audi.

=== Hiatus from racing (2021–present) ===
In November 2020, Abt announced that although he had been offered a seat for the 2020–21 Formula E season, he chose to step away from racing for the time being. Instead, he took on a role as a TV expert and co-commentator for Sat.1’s Formula E broadcasts that season. He made it clear that this wasn’t a permanent goodbye to motorsport but felt that taking a break from official racing was the right decision for him. Since then, Abt has focused on other professional pursuits outside of active competition.

== Additional information ==
From 2008 to 2010, Abt was a candidate of the Deutsche Post Speed Academy. As the Academy's overall winner in 2009 and 2010, he was named "Germany's motorsport talent of the year". From 2010 onwards, Abt was also a member of Volkswagen's talent promotion programme.

== Personal life ==
After obtaining his advanced technical college entrance qualification at a technical secondary school (Fachoberschule), Abt began studying business informatics, but did not complete his degree; he also did not undertake any formal vocational training.

On 8 August 2025, Abt married his fiancée Bianca Abt (née Forstmaier), who is from Sulzberg, Oberallgäu, in a civil ceremony in Kempten, Bavaria.

Several members of Abt's family are involved in motorsport. His father, Hans-Jürgen Abt, is the owner and team principal of the racing team Abt Sportsline, which competes in the Deutsche Tourenwagen Masters (DTM), among other series. His uncle, Christian Abt, is also a racing driver and was active in the DTM for several years.

Since April 2014, Abt has been running the YouTube channel Daniel Abt, where he documents his life as a racing driver. As of December 2023, the channel had 632,000 subscribers and more than 204 million views. In April 2020, he launched the podcast Reden am Limit together with Benedikt Mayr and Mitja Lafere.

Since 2020, Abt has worked as a Formula E pundit for the German television channel Sat.1.

== Entrepreneurial activities ==
Abt is the managing director of the Abt Lifestyle GmbH, which he founded himself, and, together with his father, sister, and other individuals, serves on the supervisory board of ABT SE, the main shareholder of Abt Sportsline GmbH. Most recently, Abt held a 5.86% stake in his father Hans-Jürgen Abt’s company, Abt Sportsline GmbH, before ABT SE became the main shareholder, according to the shareholder list in the German Commercial Register as of July 2022. Furthermore, Abt is also involved in other companies, which mainly belong to his family or are intended for his own projects.

== Racing record ==
=== Career summary ===
Season	Series	Team	Races	Wins	Poles	F/Laps	Podiums	Points	Position
2008	ADAC Formel Masters	Team Abt Sportsline	16	0	1	1	3	91	8th
2009	ADAC Formel Masters	Team Abt Sportsline	16	8	7	3	10	224	**1st**
2009	German Formula 3 Championship	Performance Racing	2	0	0	0	0	0	NC
2010	German Formula 3 Championship	Van Amersfoort Racing	18	2	6	5	10	112	**2nd**
2010	Macau Grand Prix	Signature	1	0	0	0	0	0	NC
2011	Formula 3 Euro Series	Signature	27	0	0	1	4	150	7th
2011	Macau Grand Prix	Signature	1	0	0	0	0	0	NC
2011	Masters of Formula 3	Signature	1	0	0	0	0	0	6th
2011	FIA Formula 3 International Trophy	Signature	8	0	0	0	0	44	4th
2012	GP3 Series	Lotus GP	16	2	1	0	7	149.5	**2nd**
2012	Formula Renault 3.5 Series	Tech 1 Racing	6	0	0	0	0	0	34th
2012	German Formula 3 Championship	Van Amersfoort Racing	3	0	0	0	1	18	14th
2012	Macau Grand Prix	Carlin	1	0	0	0	0	0	12th
2013	GP2 Series	ART Grand Prix	22	0	0	0	0	11	22nd
2014	GP2 Series	Hilmer Motorsport	20	0	0	0	0	27	16th
2014–15	Formula E	Audi Sport ABT	11	0	1	1	1	32	11th
2015	FIA World Endurance Championship	Rebellion Racing	4	0	0	0	0	2	28th
2015	24 Hours of Le Mans	Rebellion Racing	1	0	0	0	0	N/A	18th
2015–16	Formula E	ABT Schaeffler Audi Sport	10	0	0	0	3	68	7th
2016	ADAC GT Masters	Bentley Team ABT	13	0	1	0	1	45	19th
2016	24H Series - A6	C. Abt Racing	1	0	0	0	0	0	NC
2016–17	Formula E	ABT Schaeffler Audi Sport	12	0	0	1	0	67	8th
2017–18	Formula E	Audi Sport ABT Schaeffler	12	2	1	3	4	120	5th
2018–19	Formula E	Audi Sport ABT Schaeffler	13	0	0	2	2	95	7th
2019–20	Formula E	Audi Sport ABT Schaeffler	5	0	0	1	0	8	21st
2019–20	Formula E	Nio 333 FE Team	6	0	0	0	0	8	21st

=== Complete ADAC Formel Masters results ===
(key) (Races in bold indicate pole position) (Races in italics indicate fastest lap)

Year	Team	1	2	3	4	5	6	7	8	9	10	11	12	13	14	15	16	Pos	Points
2008	Team Abt Sportsline	OSC1; 1; 17	OSC1; 2; 8	NÜR1; 1; 9	NÜR1; 2; 20	ASS; 1; 7	ASS; 2; 8	**NÜR2**; **1**; 2	NÜR2; 2 Ret	LAU; 1; 3	LAU; 2; 4	SAC; 1; 2	SAC; 2 Ret	OSC2; 1; 7	OSC2; 2; 4	HOC; 1; 4	HOC; 2 Ret	8th	91
2009	Team Abt Sportsline	**OSC1**; **1**; 1	**OSC1**; **2**; 2	ASS; 1 EX	ASS; 2 EX	**NÜR1**; **1**; 1	NÜR1; 2; 1	HOC; 1; 5	HOC; 2; 1	**LAU**; **1** Ret	**LAU**; **2**; 1	**NÜR2**; **1**; 1	**NÜR2**; **2**; 1	SAC; 1; 2	SAC; 2; 1	OSC2; 1; 8	OSC2; 2; 9	1st	224

=== Complete German Formula Three Championship results ===
(key)

Year	Entrant	Chassis	Engine	1	2	3	4	5	6	7	8	9	10	11	12	13	14	15	16	17	18	DC	Points
2010	Van Amersfoort Racing	Dallara F306	Volkswagen	**OSC1**; **1**; 2	OSC1; 2; 3	SAC; 1; 4	SAC; 2; 2	**HOC**; **1**; 5	HOC; 2; 3	**ASS1**; **1**; 2	**ASS1**; **2**; 1	**NÜR1**; **1**; 5	NÜR1; 2; 3	ASS2; 1; 10	ASS2; 2; 15	**LAU**; **1**; 4	LAU; 2; 4	NÜR2; 1; 2	NÜR2; 2; 2	OSC2; 1; 1	OSC2; 2; 16†	2nd	112

=== Complete Formula 3 Euro Series results ===
(key)

Year	Entrant	Chassis	Engine	1	2	3	4	5	6	7	8	9	10	11	12	13	14	15	16	17	18	19	20	21	22	23	24	25	26	27	DC	Points
2011	Signature	Dallara F308/057	Volkswagen	LEC; 1 Ret	LEC; 2; 11	LEC; 3; 9	HOC; 1; 4	HOC; 2; 7	HOC; 3; 6	ZAN; 1 Ret	ZAN; 2; 8	ZAN; 3; 5	RBR; 1; 6	RBR; 2; 3	RBR; 3; 4	NOR; 1; 10	NOR; 2; 10	NOR; 3; 3	NÜR; 1; 12	NÜR; 2; 7	NÜR; 3; 7	SIL; 1; 5	SIL; 2; 5	SIL; 3; 5	VAL; 1; 10	VAL; 2; 10	VAL; 3; 7	HOC; 1; 5	HOC; 2; 3	HOC; 3; 6	7th	150

=== Complete GP3 Series results ===
(key) (Races in bold indicate pole position)

Year	Entrant	1	2	3	4	5	6	7	8	9	10	11	12	13	14	15	16	D.C.	Points
2012	Lotus GP	CAT; FEA; 13	CAT; SPR; 6	MON; FEA; 6	MON; SPR; 3	VAL; FEA; 6	VAL; SPR; 2	SIL; FEA; 4	SIL; SPR; Ret	**HOC**; **FEA**; 7	HOC; SPR; 2	HUN; FEA; 2	HUN; SPR; 11	SPA; FEA; 1	SPA; SPR; 5	MNZ; FEA; 1	MNZ; SPR; 2	**2nd**	**149.5**

=== Complete Formula Renault 3.5 Series results ===
(key)

Year	Team	1	2	3	4	5	6	7	8	9	10	11	12	13	14	15	16	17	Pos	Points
2012	Tech 1 Racing	ALC; 1	ALC; 2	MON; 1	SPA; 1	SPA; 2	NÜR; 1	NÜR; 2	MSC; 1	MSC; 2	SIL; 1	SIL; 2	HUN; 1; 18	HUN; 2; 24	LEC; 1 Ret	LEC; 2; 18	CAT; 1; 16	CAT; 2 Ret	34th	0

=== Complete GP2 Series results ===
(key)

Year	Entrant	1	2	3	4	5	6	7	8	9	10	11	12	13	14	15	16	17	18	19	20	21	22	D.C.	Points
2013	ART Grand Prix	SEP; FEA; Ret	SEP; SPR; 16	BHR; FEA; 14	BHR; SPR; 7	CAT; FEA; 11	CAT; SPR; 8	MON; FEA; 16	MON; SPR; 22	SIL; FEA; 15	SIL; SPR; Ret	NÜR; FEA; 21	NÜR; SPR; 18	HUN; FEA; 24†	HUN; SPR; 14	SPA; FEA; 16	SPA; SPR; 16	MNZ; FEA; 17	MNZ; SPR; 22	MRN; FEA; 13	MRN; SPR; DSQ	YMC; FEA; 9	YMC; SPR; 5	22nd	11
2014	Hilmer Motorsport	BHR; FEA; 13	BHR; SPR; 13	CAT; FEA; Ret	CAT; SPR; 12	MON; FEA; Ret	MON; SPR; 17	RBR; FEA; 17	RBR; SPR; 23	SIL; FEA; 10	SIL; SPR; 11	HOC; FEA; 20	HOC; SPR; 15	HUN; FEA; 5	HUN; SPR; 5	SPA; FEA; 8	SPA; SPR; 5	MNZ; FEA; Ret	MNZ; SPR; 10	SOC; FEA; Ret	SOC; SPR; 13	YMC; FEA	YMC; SPR	16th	27

=== Complete Formula E results ===
(key) (Races in bold indicate pole position; races in italics indicate fastest lap)

Year	Team	Chassis	Powertrain	1	2	3	4	5	6	7	8	9	10	11	12	13	Pos	Points
2014–15	Audi Sport ABT	Spark SRT01-e	SRT01-e	BEI; 10	PUT; 10	PDE; 15	BUE; 13†	MIA; 3	**LBH**; 15	MCO; Ret	BER; 14	MSC; 5	LDN; Ret	LDN; 11			11th	32
2015–16	ABT Schaeffler Audi Sport	Spark SRT01-e	ABT Schaeffler FE01	BEI; 11	PUT; 7	PDE; 8	BUE; 13	MEX; 7	LBH; 3	PAR; 10	BER; 2	LDN; Ret	LDN; 2				7th	68
2016–17	ABT Schaeffler Audi Sport	Spark SRT01-e	ABT Schaeffler FE02	HKG; Ret	MRK; 6	BUE; 7	MEX; 7	MCO; 7	PAR; 13†	BER; 6	BER; 4	NYC; 14†	NYC; Ret	MTL; 4	MTL; 6		8th	67
2017–18	Audi Sport ABT Schaeffler	Spark SRT01-e	Audi e-tron FE04	HKG; 5	HKG; DSQ	MRK; 10	SCL; Ret	MEX; 1	PDE; 14	RME; 4	PAR; 7	**BER**; 1	ZUR; 13	NYC; 2	NYC; 3		5th	120
2018–19	Audi Sport ABT Schaeffler	Spark SRT05e	Audi e-tron FE05	ADR; 8	MRK; 10	SCL; 3	MEX; 10	HKG; 4	SYX; 5	RME; 18†	PAR; 3	MCO; 15	BER; 6	BRN; 6	NYC; 6	NYC; 5	7th	95
2019–20	Audi Sport ABT Schaeffler	Spark SRT05e	Audi e-tron FE06	DIR; Ret	DIR; 6	SCL; 14	MEX; Ret	MRK; 14									21st	8
2019–20	Nio 333 FE Team	Spark SRT05e	Nio FE-005						BER; 18	BER; 16	BER; 15	BER; 18	BER; Ret	BER; 20			21st	8

† Driver did not finish the race, but was classified as he completed over 90% of the race distance.

=== 24 Hours of Le Mans results ===
Year	Team	Co-Drivers	Car	Class	Laps	Pos.	Class Pos.
2015	(Switzerland) Rebellion Racing	(Switzerland) Alexandre Imperatori (Austria) Dominik Kraihamer	Rebellion R-One-AER	LMP1	336	18th	9th

=== Complete FIA World Endurance Championship results ===
Year	Entrant	Class	Chassis	Engine	1	2	3	4	5	6	7	8	Rank	Points
2015	Rebellion Racing	LMP1	Rebellion R-One	AER P60 2.4 L Turbo V6	SIL	SPA	LMS; 17	NÜR; Ret	COA; 14	FUJ; 16	SHA	BHR	28th	2

Sporting positions
Preceded by Armando Parente	ADAC Formel Masters; Champion; 2009	Succeeded by Richie Stanaway
