= 2009 ADAC Formel Masters =

Motorsport season

Seasons
- ← 2008 2010 →

The 2009 ADAC Formel Masters season was the second season of the ADAC Formel Masters series from Germany. Daniel Abt became series champion, after winning eight of the season's sixteen races, and competed as a Volkswagen Junior driver in the German Formula Three Championship in 2010.

== Teams and drivers ==
- All cars are powered by Volkswagen engines, and Dallara Formulino chassis.

Team	No.	Driver	Rounds
(Austria) Neuhauser Racing	2	(Austria) Dominik Baumann	All
(Austria) Neuhauser Racing	3	(Switzerland) Devis Schwägli	1
(Austria) Neuhauser Racing	30	(United Kingdom) Daniel Cammish	6–8
(Germany) KUG Motorsport (Germany) Emotional Engineering	4	(Germany) Dennis Vollmair	1–3
(Germany) KUG Motorsport (Germany) Emotional Engineering	5	(Germany) Patrick Schranner	All
(Germany) KUG Motorsport (Germany) Emotional Engineering	12	(Germany) Maximilian Mayer	1–7
(Germany) KUG Motorsport (Germany) Emotional Engineering	23	(Germany) Riccardo Brutschin	4–6
(Germany) KUG Motorsport (Germany) Emotional Engineering	27	(United Kingdom) Freddie Hunt	1–5
(Germany) Team Abt Sportsline	6	(Germany) Daniel Abt	All
(Germany) Team Abt Sportsline	7	(Austria) René Binder	All
(Netherlands) Van Amersfoort Racing	8	(Germany) Christian Wangard	1–4, 6–7
(Netherlands) Van Amersfoort Racing	9	(Netherlands) Justin Ros	1
(Netherlands) Van Amersfoort Racing	25	(Netherlands) Liroy Stuart	2–3
(Netherlands) Van Amersfoort Racing	26	(Germany) Ferdinand Stuck	5–8
(Netherlands) Van Amersfoort Racing	33	(India) Saran Vikram	8
(Germany) Team TNB	10	(Switzerland) Janick Aeschlimann	All
(Germany) Team TNB	11	(Austria) Kevin Friesacher	All
(Germany) Team TNB	23	(Germany) Riccardo Brutschin	1–3
(Germany) KSW Motorsport	13	(Germany) Toni Koitsch	1–5, 7–8
(Germany) ma-con Motorsport	14	(United States) Liam Kenney	1–5
(Germany) ma-con Motorsport	15	(United Kingdom) Adrian Campfield	All
(Germany) ma-con Motorsport	29	(New Zealand) Richie Stanaway	6–8
(Germany) Mücke Motorsport	16	(Germany) Philip Wulbusch	1–5
(Germany) Mücke Motorsport	17	(Switzerland) Riccardo Galli	1
(Germany) Mücke Motorsport	28	(Brazil) Pedro Bianchini	4
(Germany) URD Rennsport	18	(Austria) Klaus Bachler	All
(Germany) URD Rennsport	19	(Germany) Yannick Fübrich	4
(Germany) Eifelland Racing	22	(Germany) Burkhard Maring	3–6, 8

== Race calendar and results ==
Round		Circuit	Date	Pole position	Fastest lap	Winning driver	Winning team	Supporting
1	R1	(Germany) Oschersleben	12 April	(Germany) Daniel Abt	(Germany) Daniel Abt	(Germany) Daniel Abt	(Germany) Team Abt Sportsline	ADAC Master Weekend
1	R2	(Germany) Oschersleben	13 April	(Germany) Daniel Abt	(Austria) Klaus Bachler	(Austria) Klaus Bachler	(Germany) URD Rennsport	ADAC Master Weekend
2	R1	(Netherlands) TT Circuit Assen	9 May	(United States) Liam Kenney	(United Kingdom) Adrian Campfield	(United Kingdom) Adrian Campfield	(Germany) ma-con Motorsport	Dutch Truck Grand Prix
2	R2	(Netherlands) TT Circuit Assen	10 May	(United States) Liam Kenney	(Germany) Dennis Vollmair	(United Kingdom) Adrian Campfield	(Germany) ma-con Motorsport	Dutch Truck Grand Prix
3	R1	(Germany) Nürburgring	23 May	(Germany) Daniel Abt	(Germany) Daniel Abt	(Germany) Daniel Abt	(Germany) Team Abt Sportsline	24 Hours Nürburgring
3	R2	(Germany) Nürburgring	23 May	(Austria) Kevin Friesacher	(Austria) Kevin Friesacher	(Germany) Daniel Abt	(Germany) Team Abt Sportsline	24 Hours Nürburgring
4	R1	(Germany) Hockenheim	6 June	(United Kingdom) Adrian Campfield	(Austria) René Binder	(Austria) Klaus Bachler	(Germany) URD Rennsport	ADAC Master Weekend
4	R2	(Germany) Hockenheim	7 June	(Austria) Klaus Bachler	(Austria) Klaus Bachler	(Germany) Daniel Abt	(Germany) Team Abt Sportsline	ADAC Master Weekend
5	R1	(Germany) EuroSpeedway Lausitz	4 July	(Germany) Daniel Abt	(Germany) Burkhard Maring	(Austria) Klaus Bachler	(Germany) URD Rennsport	ADAC Master Weekend
5	R2	(Germany) EuroSpeedway Lausitz	5 July	(Germany) Daniel Abt	(United Kingdom) Adrian Campfield	(Germany) Daniel Abt	(Germany) Team Abt Sportsline	ADAC Master Weekend
6	R1	(Germany) Nürburgring	22 August	(Germany) Daniel Abt	(Germany) Daniel Abt	(Germany) Daniel Abt	(Germany) Team Abt Sportsline	1000 km Nürburgring
6	R2	(Germany) Nürburgring	22 August	(Germany) Daniel Abt	(Austria) Kevin Friesacher	(Germany) Daniel Abt	(Germany) Team Abt Sportsline	1000 km Nürburgring
7	R1	(Germany) Sachsenring	19 September	(United Kingdom) Adrian Campfield	(Austria) Klaus Bachler	(United Kingdom) Adrian Campfield	(Germany) ma-con Motorsport	ADAC Master Weekend
7	R2	(Germany) Sachsenring	20 September	(New Zealand) Richie Stanaway	(United Kingdom) Daniel Cammish	(Germany) Daniel Abt	(Germany) Team Abt Sportsline	ADAC Master Weekend
8	R1	(Germany) Oschersleben	17 October	(United Kingdom) Adrian Campfield	(United Kingdom) Adrian Campfield	(United Kingdom) Adrian Campfield	(Germany) ma-con Motorsport	ADAC Master Weekend
8	R2	(Germany) Oschersleben	18 October	(Austria) Klaus Bachler	(Austria) Klaus Bachler	(Germany) Burkhard Maring	(Germany) Eifelland Racing	ADAC Master Weekend

== Championship standings ==
=== Drivers' ===
Position	1st	2nd	3rd	4th	5th	6th	7th	8th	9th	10th	Pole
Points	20	15	12	10	8	6	4	3	2	1	3

Pos	Driver	OSC (Germany)		ASS (Netherlands)		NÜR (Germany)		HOC (Germany)		LAU (Germany)		NÜR (Germany)		SAC (Germany)		OSC (Germany)		Pts
1	(Germany) Daniel Abt	**1**	**2**	EX	EX	**1**	1	5	1	**Ret**	**1**	**1**	**1**	2	1	8	9	224
2	(Austria) Klaus Bachler	4	1	2	3	Ret	6	1	**2**	1	14	3	3	4	2	11	**2**	188
3	(United Kingdom) Adrian Campfield	2	4	1	1	4	2	**Ret**	3	7	2	5	8	**1**	6	**1**	Ret	187
4	(Austria) Kevin Friesacher	5	3	8	5	2	**3**	7	4	3	5	14	2	3	8	Ret	3	137
5	(Germany) Patrick Schranner	6	5	4	4	6	4	6	8	5	7	6	7	Ret	4	3	6	109
6	(Germany) Burkhard Maring					5	12	2	5	2	4	4	Ret			4	1	96
7	(Austria) René Binder	3	10	5	Ret	7	Ret	3	12	6	Ret	2	5	6	9	6	4	90
8	(New Zealand) Richie Stanaway											13	4	7	**3**	2	5	52
9	(United States) Liam Kenney	7	7	**9**	**6**	8	11	13	6	10	3							44
10	(Germany) Christian Wangard	8	6	11	Ret	3	5	Ret	11			9	12	Ret	10			32
11	(Netherlands) Liroy Stuart			3	2	16	7											31
12	(Austria) Dominik Baumann	10	15	6	12	13	15	Ret	Ret	9	8	10	10	5	7	7	10	31
13	(United Kingdom) Daniel Cammish											8	13	8	5	5	Ret	22
14	(Germany) Maximilian Mayer	16	8	12	10	11	13	8	9	8	9	7	9	12	11			20
15	(Germany) Ferdinand Stuck									4	11	12	14	9	13	9	7	18
16	(Germany) Philip Wulbusch	11	11	10	8	15	16	4	Ret	Ret	13							14
17	(Germany) Riccardo Brutschin	19	Ret	14	11	14	14	9	13	Ret	6	Ret	6					14
18	(Germany) Toni Koitsch	15	13	13	9	10	9	10	10	Ret	12			11	12	10	8	11
19	(Germany) Dennis Vollmair	13	Ret	7	7	Ret	DNS											8
20	(United Kingdom) Freddie Hunt	12	16	16	13	9	8	Ret	DNS	DNS	DNS							5
21	(Germany) Yannick Fübrich							11	7									4
22	(Switzerland) Devis Schwägli	9	9															4
23	(Switzerland) Janick Aeschlimann	14	12	15	14	12	10	12	14	Ret	10	11	11	10	Ret	13	Ret	3
24	(India) Saran Vikram															12	11	0
25	(Switzerland) Riccardo Galli	17	14															0
26	(Netherlands) Justin Ros	18	Ret															0
	(Brazil) Pedro Bianchini							Ret	Ret									0
Pos	Driver	OSC (Germany)		ASS (Netherlands)		NÜR (Germany)		HOC (Germany)		LAU (Germany)		NÜR (Germany)		SAC (Germany)		OSC (Germany)		Pts

Colour	Result
Gold	Winner
Silver	Second place
Bronze	Third place
Green	Points classification
Blue	Non-points classification
Blue	Non-classified finish (NC)
Purple	Retired, not classified (Ret)
Red	Did not qualify (DNQ)
Red	Did not pre-qualify (DNPQ)
Black	Disqualified (DSQ)
White	Did not start (DNS)
White	Withdrew (WD)
White	Race cancelled (C)
Blank	Did not practice (DNP)
Blank	Did not arrive (DNA)
Blank	Excluded (EX)

**Bold** – Pole
Italics – Fastest Lap

=== Teams' ===
Position	1st	2nd	3rd	4th	5th	6th	7th	8th	9th	10th
Points	20	15	12	10	8	6	4	3	2	1

Pos	Team	OSC (Germany)		ASS (Netherlands)		NÜR (Germany)		HOC (Germany)		LAU (Germany)		NÜR (Germany)		SAC (Germany)		OSC (Germany)		Pts
1	(Germany) Team Abt Sportsline	1	2	5	Ret	1	1	3	1	5	1	1	1	2	1	6	4	234
2	(Germany) ma-con Motorsport	2	4	1	1	4	2	13	3	7	2	5	4	1	3	1	5	204
3	(Germany) URD Rennsport	4	1	2	3	Ret	6	1	2	1	14	3	3	4	2	11	2	192
4	(Germany) Team TNB	5	3	8	5	2	3	7	4	3	5	11	2	3	8	13	3	150
5	(Germany) KUG Motorsport	6	5	4	4	6	4	6	8	5	7	6	7	12	4	3	6	129
6	(Germany) Eifelland Racing					5	12	2	5	2	4	4	Ret			4	1	105
7	(Netherlands) Van Amersfoort Racing	8	6	3	2	3	5	Ret	11	4	11	9	12	9	10	9	7	103
8	(Austria) Neuhauser Racing	9	9	6	12	13	15	Ret	Ret	9	8	8	10	5	5	5	10	67
9	(Germany) Mücke Motorsport	11	11	10	8	15	16	4	Ret	Ret	13							30
10	(Germany) Emotional Engineering							9	13	8	6	Ret	6					26
11	(Germany) KSW Motorsport	15	13	13	9	10	9											12
Pos	Team	OSC (Germany)		ASS (Netherlands)		NÜR (Germany)		HOC (Germany)		LAU (Germany)		NÜR (Germany)		SAC (Germany)		OSC (Germany)		Pts

Colour	Result
Gold	Winner
Silver	Second place
Bronze	Third place
Green	Points classification
Blue	Non-points classification
Blue	Non-classified finish (NC)
Purple	Retired, not classified (Ret)
Red	Did not qualify (DNQ)
Red	Did not pre-qualify (DNPQ)
Black	Disqualified (DSQ)
White	Did not start (DNS)
White	Withdrew (WD)
White	Race cancelled (C)
Blank	Did not practice (DNP)
Blank	Did not arrive (DNA)
Blank	Excluded (EX)
