= 2010 ADAC Formel Masters =

Motorsport season

Seasons
- ← 2009 2011 →

The 2010 ADAC Formel Masters season was the third season of the ADAC Formel Masters series from Germany. Richie Stanaway won twelve of the first 18 races en route to claiming championship victory with a meeting to spare. His team ma-con Motorsport also claimed the teams' championship at the Nürburgring round of the series. German drivers Patrick Schranner and Mario Farnbacher finished second and third in the points.

== Teams and drivers ==
Team	No.	Drivers	Rounds
(Austria) Neuhauser Racing	2	(Austria) Dominik Baumann	All
(Austria) Neuhauser Racing	3	(Austria) Gerhard Tweraser	All
(Germany) KUG Motorsport	4	(Switzerland) Janick Aeschlimann	1–3
(Germany) KUG Motorsport	5	(Germany) Patrick Schranner	All
(Germany) KUG Motorsport	6	(Germany) Maximilian Buhk	All
(Germany) KUG Motorsport	12	(Germany) Maximilian Mayer	1–3, 5–6
(Germany) ADAC Berlin-Brandenburg e.V.	7	(Germany) Pascal Wehrlein	All
(Germany) ADAC Berlin-Brandenburg e.V.	24	(Switzerland) Andrina Gugger	All
(Germany) ma-con Motorsport	9	(New Zealand) Richie Stanaway	1–6
(Germany) ma-con Motorsport	10	(France) William Vermont	All
(Germany) ma-con Motorsport	11	(Germany) Mario Farnbacher	All
(Germany) ma-con Motorsport	16	(Denmark) Christina Nielsen	5, 7
(Germany) KSW Motorsport	13	(Germany) Toni Koitsch	All
(Germany) G&J Motorsport	14	(Germany) Ferdinand Gabor	3, 6–7
(Germany) URD Rennsport	18	(Germany) Lucas Wolf	All
(Germany) Eifelland Racing	21	(Finland) Joni Wiman	1–5
(Germany) Eifelland Racing	22	(Germany) Sven Müller	All

== Race calendar and results ==
- The number of races will increase from 16 to 21, with a triple-race format at each round. That said, the number of rounds will drop from eight to seven. Each race weekend will be a part of the ADAC's Masters Weekend package.

Round		Circuit	Date	Pole position	Fastest lap	Winning driver	Winning team
1	R1	(Germany) Oschersleben	10 April	(Germany) Patrick Schranner	(Germany) Pascal Wehrlein	(Germany) Patrick Schranner	(Germany) KUG Motorsport
1	R2	(Germany) Oschersleben	11 April		(France) William Vermont	(New Zealand) Richie Stanaway	(Germany) ma-con Motorsport
1	R3	(Germany) Oschersleben	11 April		(Germany) Patrick Schranner	(Germany) Patrick Schranner	(Germany) KUG Motorsport
2	R1	(Germany) Sachsenring	8 May	(New Zealand) Richie Stanaway	(New Zealand) Richie Stanaway	(New Zealand) Richie Stanaway	(Germany) ma-con Motorsport
2	R2	(Germany) Sachsenring	9 May		(New Zealand) Richie Stanaway	(New Zealand) Richie Stanaway	(Germany) ma-con Motorsport
2	R3	(Germany) Sachsenring	9 May		(Austria) Gerhard Tweraser	(Germany) Pascal Wehrlein	(Germany) ADAC Berlin-Brandenburg e.V.
3	R1	(Germany) Hockenheim	29 May	(Germany) Patrick Schranner	(Germany) Patrick Schranner	(New Zealand) Richie Stanaway	(Germany) ma-con Motorsport
3	R2	(Germany) Hockenheim	30 May		(Austria) Gerhard Tweraser	(New Zealand) Richie Stanaway	(Germany) ma-con Motorsport
3	R3	(Germany) Hockenheim	30 May		(New Zealand) Richie Stanaway	(New Zealand) Richie Stanaway	(Germany) ma-con Motorsport
4	R1	(Netherlands) TT Circuit Assen	17 July	(Germany) Pascal Wehrlein	(New Zealand) Richie Stanaway	(Germany) Patrick Schranner	(Germany) KUG Motorsport
4	R2	(Netherlands) TT Circuit Assen	18 July		(New Zealand) Richie Stanaway	(New Zealand) Richie Stanaway	(Germany) ma-con Motorsport
4	R3	(Netherlands) TT Circuit Assen	18 July		(Germany) Mario Farnbacher	(Germany) Patrick Schranner	(Germany) KUG Motorsport
5	R1	(Germany) EuroSpeedway Lausitz	14 August	(France) William Vermont	(New Zealand) Richie Stanaway	(New Zealand) Richie Stanaway	(Germany) ma-con Motorsport
5	R2	(Germany) EuroSpeedway Lausitz	15 August		(New Zealand) Richie Stanaway	(New Zealand) Richie Stanaway	(Germany) ma-con Motorsport
5	R3	(Germany) EuroSpeedway Lausitz	15 August		(Germany) Patrick Schranner	(Germany) Patrick Schranner	(Germany) KUG Motorsport
6	R1	(Germany) Nürburgring	28 August	(New Zealand) Richie Stanaway	(New Zealand) Richie Stanaway	(New Zealand) Richie Stanaway	(Germany) ma-con Motorsport
6	R2	(Germany) Nürburgring	28 August		(Germany) Patrick Schranner	(New Zealand) Richie Stanaway	(Germany) ma-con Motorsport
6	R3	(Germany) Nürburgring	29 August		(New Zealand) Richie Stanaway	(New Zealand) Richie Stanaway	(Germany) ma-con Motorsport
7	R1	(Germany) Oschersleben	2 October	(Germany) Mario Farnbacher	(Germany) Mario Farnbacher	(Germany) Mario Farnbacher	(Germany) ma-con Motorsport
7	R2	(Germany) Oschersleben	3 October		(Austria) Dominik Baumann	(Germany) Mario Farnbacher	(Germany) ma-con Motorsport
7	R3	(Germany) Oschersleben	3 October		(Austria) Dominik Baumann	(Germany) Mario Farnbacher	(Germany) ma-con Motorsport

== Championship standings ==
=== Drivers' Championship ===
Position	1st	2nd	3rd	4th	5th	6th	7th	8th	9th	10th
Points	20	15	12	10	8	6	4	3	2	1

Pos	Driver	OSC (Germany)			SAC (Germany)			HOC (Germany)			ASS (Netherlands)			LAU (Germany)			NÜR (Germany)			OSC (Germany)			Pts
1	(New Zealand) Richie Stanaway	2	1	2	**1**	1	2	1	1	1	2	1	2	1	1	Ret	**1**	1	1				315
2	(Germany) Patrick Schranner	**1**	4	1	6	4	3	**7**	5	4	1	2	1	3	2	1	4	3	2	6	7	6	255
3	(Germany) Mario Farnbacher	6	6	5	2	11	5	2	2	3	3	3	3	Ret	3	3	6	4	4	**1**	1	1	231
4	(France) William Vermont	Ret	2	13	11	6	8	3	3	2	5	5	6	**2**	8	10	2	2	3	5	5	8	165
5	(Austria) Gerhard Tweraser	7	3	3	Ret	12	4	Ret	6	5	6	6	4	Ret	4	2	7	6	5	3	3	5	149
6	(Germany) Pascal Wehrlein	3	8	4	3	2	1	10	7	13	**4**	4	5	5	10	9	8	5	7	DNS	6	4	147
7	(Austria) Dominik Baumann	4	Ret	10	4	13	13	4	4	12	13	10	7	7	7	8	3	9	9	2	2	2	118
8	(Germany) Lucas Wolf	8	13	14	7	5	6	6	12	14	12	11	13	10	11	6	11	12	10	4	4	3	67
9	(Germany) Sven Müller	Ret	Ret	9	Ret	14	Ret	8	9	7	10	8	8	8	9	5	9	11	6	7	8	7	50
10	(Switzerland) Janick Aeschlimann	Ret	5	6	5	7	9	5	8	6													45
11	(Finland) Joni Wiman	Ret	9	8	8	3	7	12	DNS	Ret	9	7	12	4	Ret	NC							40
12	(Germany) Maximilian Buhk	9	10	11	10	8	Ret	11	15	9	8	Ret	9	6	5	Ret	Ret	8	14	9	13	10	34
13	(Germany) Maximilian Mayer	Ret	12	7	9	9	11	9	10	8				13	6	4	Ret	10	13				31
14	(Germany) Toni Koitsch	10	7	12	12	Ret	10	15	11	11	11	12	11	9	Ret	7	5	7	8	Ret	12	13	27
15	(Switzerland) Andrina Gugger	5	11	Ret	Ret	10	12	14	14	Ret	7	9	10	11	Ret	11	Ret	Ret	11	8	9	9	23
16	(Germany) Ferdinand Gabor							13	13	10							10	13	12	10	11	11	3
17	(Denmark) Christina Nielsen													12	12	Ret				11	10	12	1
Pos	Driver	OSC (Germany)			SAC (Germany)			HOC (Germany)			ASS (Netherlands)			LAU (Germany)			NÜR (Germany)			OSC (Germany)			Pts

Colour	Result
Gold	Winner
Silver	Second place
Bronze	Third place
Green	Points classification
Blue	Non-points classification
Blue	Non-classified finish (NC)
Purple	Retired, not classified (Ret)
Red	Did not qualify (DNQ)
Red	Did not pre-qualify (DNPQ)
Black	Disqualified (DSQ)
White	Did not start (DNS)
White	Withdrew (WD)
White	Race cancelled (C)
Blank	Did not practice (DNP)
Blank	Did not arrive (DNA)
Blank	Excluded (EX)

**Bold** – Pole
Italics – Fastest Lap

=== Teams' Championship ===
Position	1st	2nd	3rd	4th	5th	6th	7th	8th	9th	10th
Points	20	15	12	10	8	6	4	3	2	1

Pos	Team	OSC (Germany)			SAC (Germany)			HOC (Germany)			ASS (Netherlands)			LAU (Germany)			NÜR (Germany)			OSC (Germany)			Pts
1	(Germany) ma-con Motorsport	2	1	2	1	1	2	1	1	1	2	1	2	1	1	3	1	1	1	1	1	1	615
1	(Germany) ma-con Motorsport	6	2	5	2	6	5	2	2	2	3	3	3	2	3	10	2	2	3	5	5	8	615
2	(Germany) KUG Motorsport	1	4	1	5	4	3	5	5	4	1	2	1	3	2	1	4	3	2	6	7	6	352
2	(Germany) KUG Motorsport	9	5	6	6	7	9	7	8	6	8	Ret	9	6	5	4	Ret	8	13	9	13	10	352
3	(Austria) Neuhauser Racing	4	3	3	4	12	4	4	4	5	6	6	4	7	4	2	3	6	5	2	2	2	298
3	(Austria) Neuhauser Racing	7	Ret	10	Ret	13	13	Ret	6	12	13	10	7	Ret	7	8	7	9	9	3	3	5	298
4	(Germany) ADAC Berlin-Brandenburg e.V.	3	8	4	3	2	1	10	7	13	4	4	5	5	10	9	8	5	7	8	6	4	193
4	(Germany) ADAC Berlin-Brandenburg e.V.	5	11	Ret	Ret	10	12	14	14	Ret	7	9	10	11	Ret	11	Ret	Ret	11	DNS	9	9	193
5	(Germany) Eifelland Racing	Ret	9	8	8	3	7	8	9	7	9	7	8	4	9	5	9	11	6	7	8	7	112
5	(Germany) Eifelland Racing	Ret	Ret	9	Ret	14	Ret	12	DNS	Ret	10	8	12	8	Ret	NC							112
6	(Germany) URD Rennsport	8	13	14	7	5	6	6	12	14	12	11	13	10	11	6	11	12	10	4	4	3	77
7	(Germany) KSW Motorsport	10	7	12	12	Ret	10	15	11	11	11	12	11	9	Ret	7	5	7	8	Ret	12	13	43
8	(Germany) G&J Motorsport							13	13	10							10	13	12	10	11	11	9
Pos	Team	OSC (Germany)			SAC (Germany)			HOC (Germany)			ASS (Netherlands)			LAU (Germany)			NÜR (Germany)			OSC (Germany)			Pts

Colour	Result
Gold	Winner
Silver	Second place
Bronze	Third place
Green	Points classification
Blue	Non-points classification
Blue	Non-classified finish (NC)
Purple	Retired, not classified (Ret)
Red	Did not qualify (DNQ)
Red	Did not pre-qualify (DNPQ)
Black	Disqualified (DSQ)
White	Did not start (DNS)
White	Withdrew (WD)
White	Race cancelled (C)
Blank	Did not practice (DNP)
Blank	Did not arrive (DNA)
Blank	Excluded (EX)
