= Patrick Schranner =

German racing driver

Patrick Schranner (born 30 March 1991 in Ingolstadt) is a German racing driver.

== Career ==
Schranner began his racing career in karting in 2000. He remained in karting until 2008. Amongst others he won 2007 the ADAC Kart Masters - KF2 and became runner-up in the German Challenger Kart Championship. In 2009, he began his formula racing career. He competed in the ADAC Formel Masters for KUG Motorsport. In addition, he was supported by the ADAC Stiftung Sport. Schranner remained with KUG Motorsport for 2010 and participated in the ADAC Formel Masters for the second season. He won five races and became runner-up with 255 points to 315 behind Richie Stanaway, who dominated the season.

As of 2011, Schranner competes in the German Formula Three Championship, driving for HS Engineering.

== Personal life ==
Schranner was trained as an auto mechanic.

== Racing record ==
=== Career summary ===
Season	Series	Team	Races	Wins	Poles	F/Laps	Podiums	Points	Position
2009	ADAC Formel Masters	KUG Motorsport	16	0	0	0	1	109	5th
2010	ADAC Formel Masters	KUG Motorsport	21	5	2	4	11	255	2nd
2011	German Formula 3 Championship	HS Engineering	8	0	0	0	0	17	11th
