= ADAC Formel Masters =

Former Single-Seater Racing Championship

- Category: Single seaters
- Country: Germany
- Inaugural season: 2008
- Folded: 2014
- Drivers: 16 (2014)
- Teams: 6 (2014)
- Constructors: Dallara
- Engine suppliers: 1.6 litre Volkswagen
- Tyre suppliers: Dunlop
- Last Drivers' champion: (Denmark) Mikkel Jensen
- Last Teams' champion: (Austria) Neuhauser Racing Team
- Official website: adac-formel-masters.de

ADAC Formel Masters was an ADAC sanctioned open wheel racing series based in Germany, held annually from 2008 to 2014. It was replacement of the local Formula BMW championship. The first season was in 2008 and is the main feeder series to the ATS Formula 3 Cup (German Formula Three Championship). Like Formula Ford, French F4 Championship and Formula Abarth, the Formel Masters is aimed at karting graduates. In 2015 it was replaced by the ADAC Formula 4.

== Race weekend ==
A race weekend features one 45-minute practice session on Friday, and one 30-minute qualifying session on the same day, followed by three races. The qualifying session is a straight fight for the fastest laptime, and determines the order of the grids for Races 1 & 2.

Race 3 is on Sunday. The grid is decided by the Race 2 result with top 8 being reversed, so the driver who finished 8th on Saturday will start from pole position and the winner will start from 8th place.

Each races longs for 25 minutes.

== Scoring system ==
=== 2008-2010 ===
1st	2nd	3rd	4th	5th	6th	7th	8th	9th	10th
20	15	12	10	8	6	4	3	2	1

=== 2011 ===
1st	2nd	3rd	4th	5th	6th	7th	8th	9th	10th
25	18	15	12	10	8	6	4	2	1

=== 2012-2014 ===
Points System For Races 1 & 2
1st	2nd	3rd	4th	5th	6th	7th	8th	9th	10th
25	18	15	12	10	8	6	4	2	1

Points System For Race 3
1st	2nd	3rd	4th	5th	6th	7th	8th	9th	10th
15	10	8	7	6	5	4	3	2	1

- No points for pole or fastest lap were awarded

With this points system, the most points anyone can score in one round is 65 by winning each race. In Hockenheim round of 2012, Marvin Kirchhöfer became first driver to score all points of the weekend with this point system.

== Results ==
Season	Champion	Second	Third	Team Champion
2008	(Portugal) Armando Parente	(Germany) Nico Monien	(Austria) Klaus Bachler	(Germany) URD Motorsport
2009	(Germany) Daniel Abt	(Austria) Klaus Bachler	(United Kingdom) Adrian Campfield	(Germany) Team Abt Sportsline
2010	(New Zealand) Richie Stanaway	(Germany) Patrick Schranner	(Germany) Mario Farnbacher	(Germany) ma-con Motorsport
2011	(Germany) Pascal Wehrlein	(United Kingdom) Emil Bernstorff	(Germany) Sven Müller	(Germany) Motopark Academy
2012	(Germany) Marvin Kirchhöfer	(Sweden) Gustav Malja	(Switzerland) Jeffrey Schmidt	(Germany) Lotus
2013	(Belgium) Alessio Picariello	(Germany) Maximilian Günther	(Germany) Jason Kremer	(Germany) ADAC Berlin-Brandenburg e.V.
2014	(Denmark) Mikkel Jensen	(Germany) Maximilian Günther	(Germany) Tim Zimmermann	(Austria) Neuhauser Racing Team

== See also ==
- ADAC
- German Formula Three Championship
- International Formula Master
