= 2010 Silverstone Formula Two round =

(United Kingdom) 2010 Silverstone Formula Two round
Round details
- Round 1 of 9 in the 2010 FIA Formula Two Championship.
- Location: Silverstone Circuit, Northamptonshire, England
- Course: Permanent racing facility 5.141 km (3.194 mi)

First race
- Date: 18 April 2010
- Laps: 23
Pole position
- Driver: (United Kingdom) Jolyon Palmer
- Time: 1:36.380
Podium
- First: (United Kingdom) Jolyon Palmer
- Second: (United Kingdom) Dean Stoneman
- Third: (Russia) Sergey Afanasyev
Fastest lap
- Driver: (United Kingdom) Jolyon Palmer
- Time: 1:38.985 (on Lap 8)

Second race
- Date: 18 April 2010
- Laps: 23
Pole position
- Driver: (Austria) Philipp Eng
- Time: 1:36.992
Podium
- First: (Austria) Philipp Eng
- Second: (United Kingdom) Jolyon Palmer
- Third: (Denmark) Johan Jokinen
Fastest lap
- Driver: (Austria) Philipp Eng
- Time: 1:38.733 (on Lap 18)

The 2010 Silverstone Formula Two round was the first round of the 2010 FIA Formula Two Championship season. It was held on 18 August 2009 at the old configuration of the Silverstone Circuit in Northamptonshire, England. Pole position for first race was secured by Jolyon Palmer. Philipp Eng set his fastest lap in second qualifying.

== Classification ==
=== Qualifying 1 ===
Pos	No	Name	Time	Grid
1	3	(United Kingdom) Jolyon Palmer	1:36.380	1
2	17	(Denmark) Johan Jokinen	1:36.521	2
3	48	(United Kingdom) Dean Stoneman	1:36.707	3
4	33	(Austria) Philipp Eng	1:37.056	4
5	14	(Russia) Sergey Afanasyev	1:37.088	5
6	2	(United Kingdom) Will Bratt	1:37.390	6
7	21	(Lithuania) Kazim Vasiliauskas	1:37.468	7
8	11	(United Kingdom) Jack Clarke	1:37.497	8
9	9	(Romania) Mihai Marinescu	1:37.531	9
10	10	(France) Benjamin Lariche	1:37.573	10
11	24	(United Kingdom) Tom Gladdis	1:37.674	11
12	7	(Russia) Ivan Samarin	1:37.686	12
13	6	(India) Armaan Ebrahim	1:37.703	13
14	19	(Italy) Nicola de Marco	1:37.848	14
15	4	(Belgium) Benjamin Bailly	1:38.219	15
16	27	(United Kingdom) Paul Rees	1:38.297	16
17	12	(Netherlands) Kelvin Snoeks	1:38.425	17
18	5	(Angola) Ricardo Teixeira	1:38.490	18
19	77	(Poland) Natalia Kowalska	1:38.608	19
20	26	(India) Parthiva Sureshwaren	1:39.336	20
21	8	(Bulgaria) Plamen Kralev	1:40.065	21
22	28	(India) Ajith Kumar	1:42.664	22

=== Qualifying 2 ===
Pos	No	Name	Time	Grid
1	33	(Austria) Philipp Eng	1:36.992	1
2	3	(United Kingdom) Jolyon Palmer	1:37.012	2
3	48	(United Kingdom) Dean Stoneman	1:37.096	3
4	11	(United Kingdom) Jack Clarke	1:37.197	4
5	17	(Denmark) Johan Jokinen	1:37.242	5
6	24	(United Kingdom) Tom Gladdis	1:37.420	6
7	2	(United Kingdom) Will Bratt	1:37.439	7
8	14	(Russia) Sergey Afanasyev	1:37.586	8
9	21	(Lithuania) Kazim Vasiliauskas	1:37.774	9
10	9	(Romania) Mihai Marinescu	1:37.889	10
11	10	(France) Benjamin Lariche	1:37.910	11
12	6	(India) Armaan Ebrahim	1:37.959	12
13	19	(Italy) Nicola de Marco	1:38.137	13
14	6	(Angola) Ricardo Teixeira	1:38.263	14
15	4	(Belgium) Benjamin Bailly	1:38.419	15
16	7	(Russia) Ivan Samarin	1:38.538	16
17	12	(Netherlands) Kelvin Snoeks	1:38.731	17
18	77	(Poland) Natalia Kowalska	1:38.884	18
19	27	(United Kingdom) Paul Rees	1:38.922	19
20	26	(India) Parthiva Sureshwaren	1:39.885	20
21	8	(Bulgaria) Plamen Kralev	1:40.389	21
22	28	(India) Ajith Kumar	1:41.596	22

=== Race 1 ===
Pos	No	Driver	Laps	Time/Retired	Grid	Points
1	3	(United Kingdom) Jolyon Palmer	23	38:16.660	1	25
2	48	(United Kingdom) Dean Stoneman	23	+3.011	3	18
3	14	(Russia) Sergey Afanasyev	23	+7.084	5	15
4	33	(Austria) Philipp Eng	23	+9.932	4	12
5	21	(Lithuania) Kazim Vasiliauskas	23	+11.581	7	10
6	2	(United Kingdom) Will Bratt	23	+12.383	6	8
7	9	(Romania) Mihai Marinescu	23	+23.825	9	6
8	6	(India) Armaan Ebrahim	23	+26.881	13	4
9	19	(Italy) Nicola de Marco	23	+31.843	14	2
10	10	(France) Benjamin Lariche	23	+34.242	10	1
11	4	(Belgium) Benjamin Bailly	23	+35.835	15	
12	12	(Netherlands) Kelvin Snoeks	23	+37.416	17	
13	27	(United Kingdom) Paul Rees	23	+45.008	16	
14	77	(Poland) Natalia Kowalska	23	+49.185	19	
15	8	(Bulgaria) Plamen Kralev	23	+1:05.155	21	
16	26	(India) Parthiva Sureshwaren	23	+1:22.842	20	
17	5	(Angola) Ricardo Teixeira	22	+1 Lap	18	
18	28	(India) Ajith Kumar	22	+1 Lap	22	
Ret	17	(Denmark) Johan Jokinen	2	DNF	2	
Ret	24	(United Kingdom) Tom Gladdis	1	DNF	11	
DNS	11	(United Kingdom) Jack Clarke	0	DNS	8	
DSQ	7	(Russia) Ivan Samarin	12	DSQ	12	
Fastest lap: Jolyon Palmer 1:38.985 (186.97 km/h) on lap 8

=== Race 2 ===
Pos	No	Driver	Laps	Time/Retired	Grid	Points
1	33	(Austria) Philipp Eng	23	38:07.958	1	25
2	3	(United Kingdom) Jolyon Palmer	23	+0.807	2	18
3	17	(Denmark) Johan Jokinen	23	+16.230	5	15
4	11	(United Kingdom) Jack Clarke	23	+20.571	4	12
5	2	(United Kingdom) Will Bratt	23	+21.418	7	10
6	14	(Russia) Sergey Afanasyev	23	+28.067	8	8
7	21	(Lithuania) Kazim Vasiliauskas	23	+33.443	9	6
8	9	(Romania) Mihai Marinescu	23	+35.331	10	4
9	6	(India) Armaan Ebrahim	23	+45.026	12	2
10	19	(Italy) Nicola de Marco	23	+46.849	13	1
11	4	(Belgium) Benjamin Bailly	23	+47.747	15	
12	77	(Poland) Natalia Kowalska	23	+52.187	18	
13	27	(United Kingdom) Paul Rees	23	+53.632	19	
14	5	(Angola) Ricardo Teixeira	23	+55.003	14	
15	7	(Russia) Ivan Samarin	23	+56.655	16	
16	26	(India) Parthiva Sureshwaren	23	+1:12.674	20	
17	8	(Bulgaria) Plamen Kralev	23	+1:24.144	21	
18	28	(India) Ajith Kumar	21	+2 Laps	22	
19	10	(France) Benjamin Lariche	20	+3 Laps	11	
Ret	12	(Netherlands) Kelvin Snoeks	17	DNF	17	
Ret	48	(United Kingdom) Dean Stoneman	8	DNF	3	
Ret	24	(United Kingdom) Tom Gladdis	5	DNF	6	
Fastest lap: Philipp Eng 1:38.733 (187.45 km/h) on lap 18

== Standings after the race ==
Drivers' Championship standings

Pos	Driver	Points
1	(United Kingdom) Jolyon Palmer	43
2	(Austria) Philipp Eng	37
3	(Russia) Sergey Afanasyev	23
4	(United Kingdom) Dean Stoneman	18
5	(United Kingdom) Will Bratt	18
