= 2010 Marrakech Formula Two round =

(Morocco) 2010 Marrakech Formula Two round
Round details
- Round 2 of 9 in the 2010 FIA Formula Two Championship.
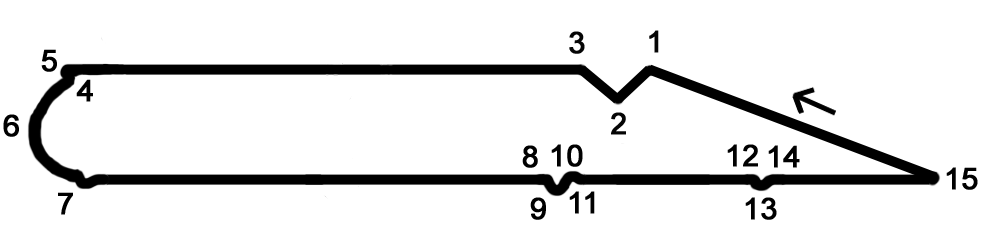
- Location: Marrakech Street Circuit, Morocco
- Course: Temporary street circuit 4.54 km (2.82 mi)

First race
- Date: May 1 2010
- Laps: 19
Pole position
- Driver: (United Kingdom) Dean Stoneman
- Time: 1:32.559
Podium
- First: (United Kingdom) Dean Stoneman
- Second: (Austria) Philipp Eng
- Third: (Netherlands) Kelvin Snoeks
Fastest lap
- Driver: (United Kingdom) Dean Stoneman
- Time: 1:31.817 (on Lap 8)

Second race
- Date: May 2 2010
- Laps: 17
Pole position
- Driver: (Austria) Philipp Eng
- Time: 1:30.186
Podium
- First: (Austria) Philipp Eng
- Second: (United Kingdom) Dean Stoneman
- Third: (United Kingdom) Will Bratt
Fastest lap
- Driver: (United Kingdom) Dean Stoneman
- Time: 1:31.312 (on Lap 16)

The 2010 Marrakech Formula Two round was the second round of the 2010 FIA Formula Two Championship season. It was held on May 1, 2010, and May 2, 2010, at the Marrakech Street Circuit, Morocco.

== Classification ==
=== Qualifying 1 ===
Pos	No	Name	Time	Grid
1	48	(United Kingdom) Dean Stoneman	1:32.559	1
2	3	(United Kingdom) Jolyon Palmer	1:32.836	2
3	11	(United Kingdom) Jack Clarke	1:32.853	3
4	2	(United Kingdom) Will Bratt	1:32.854	4
5	17	(Denmark) Johan Jokinen	1:32.939	5
6	19	(Italy) Nicola de Marco	1:32.957	6
7	33	(Austria) Philipp Eng	1:32.995	7
8	6	(India) Armaan Ebrahim	1:33.300	8
9	12	(Netherlands) Kelvin Snoeks	1:33.461	9
10	14	(Russia) Sergey Afanasyev	1:33.466	10
11	4	(Belgium) Benjamin Bailly	1:33.481	11
12	9	(Romania) Mihai Marinescu	1:33.482	12
13	27	(United Kingdom) Paul Rees	1:33.703	13
14	7	(Russia) Ivan Samarin	1:33.766	14
15	26	(India) Parthiva Sureshwaren	1:34.370	15
16	5	(Angola) Ricardo Teixeira	1:34.884	16
17	77	(Poland) Natalia Kowalska	1:35.807	17
18	8	(Bulgaria) Plamen Kralev	1:36.051	18
19	10	(France) Benjamin Lariche	1:37.327	19
20	28	(India) Ajith Kumar	1:37.802	20
21	21	(Lithuania) Kazim Vasiliauskas	No time	21

=== Qualifying 2 ===
Pos	No	Name	Time	Grid
1	33	(Austria) Philipp Eng	1:30.186	1
2	48	(United Kingdom) Dean Stoneman	1:30.719	2
3	17	(Denmark) Johan Jokinen	1:30.996	3
4	2	(United Kingdom) Will Bratt	1:31.013	4
5	21	(Lithuania) Kazim Vasiliauskas	1:31.348	5
6	9	(Romania) Mihai Marinescu	1:31.511	6
7	11	(United Kingdom) Jack Clarke	1:31.533	7
8	19	(Italy) Nicola de Marco	1:31.581	8
9	3	(United Kingdom) Jolyon Palmer	1:31.620	9
10	12	(Netherlands) Kelvin Snoeks	1:31.723	10
11	6	(India) Armaan Ebrahim	1:31.730	11
12	14	(Russia) Sergey Afanasyev	1:31.767	12
13	4	(Belgium) Benjamin Bailly	1:31.993	13
14	27	(United Kingdom) Paul Rees	1:32.421	14
15	7	(Russia) Ivan Samarin	1:32.673	15
16	26	(India) Parthiva Sureshwaren	1:33.177	16
17	77	(Poland) Natalia Kowalska	1:33.391	17
18	10	(France) Benjamin Lariche	1:33.635	18
19	5	(Angola) Ricardo Teixeira	1:33.650	19
20	28	(India) Ajith Kumar	1:34.906	20
21	8	(Bulgaria) Plamen Kralev	1:35.483	21

=== Race 1 ===
Pos	No	Driver	Laps	Time/Retired	Grid	Points
1	43	(United Kingdom) Dean Stoneman	19	42:59.228	1	25
2	33	(Austria) Philipp Eng	19	+1.277	7	18
3	12	(Netherlands) Kelvin Snoeks	19	+1.820	9	15
4	7	(Russia) Ivan Samarin	19	+2.485	14	12
5	5	(Angola) Ricardo Teixeira	19	+3.500	16	10
6	6	(India) Armaan Ebrahim	19	+3.781	8	8
7	27	(United Kingdom) Paul Rees	19	+4.733	13	6
8	14	(Russia) Sergey Afanasyev	19	+5.451	10	4
9	10	(France) Benjamin Lariche	19	+6.708	19	2
10	21	(Lithuania) Kazim Vasiliauskas	19	+7.382	21	1
11	26	(India) Parthiva Sureshwaren	19	+7.852	15	
12	8	(Bulgaria) Plamen Kralev	19	+9.442	18	
13	28	(India) Ajith Kumar	19	+11.099	20	
Ret	3	(United Kingdom) Jolyon Palmer	16	DNF	2	
Ret	17	(Denmark) Johan Jokinen	13	DNF	5	
Ret	77	(Poland) Natalia Kowalska	8	DNF	17	
Ret	9	(Romania) Mihai Marinescu	7	DNF	12	
Ret	11	(United Kingdom) Jack Clarke	0	DNF	3	
Ret	19	(Italy) Nicola de Marco	0	DNF	6	
Ret	2	(United Kingdom) Will Bratt	0	DNF	4	
Ret	4	(Belgium) Benjamin Bailly	0	DNF	11	
Fastest lap: Dean Stoneman 1:31.817 (178.20 km/h) on lap 8

=== Race 2 ===
Pos	No	Driver	Laps	Time/Retired	Grid	Points
1	33	(Austria) Philipp Eng	17	35:42.174	1	25
2	43	(United Kingdom) Dean Stoneman	17	+1.955	2	18
3	2	(United Kingdom) Will Bratt	17	+5.146	4	15
4	21	(Lithuania) Kazim Vasiliauskas	17	+8.534	5	12
5	3	(United Kingdom) Jolyon Palmer	17	+15.987	9	10
6	6	(India) Armaan Ebrahim	17	+16.851	11	8
7	14	(Russia) Sergey Afanasyev	17	+20.375	12	6
8	27	(United Kingdom) Paul Rees	17	+21.785	14	4
9	12	(Netherlands) Kelvin Snoeks	17	+24.990	10	2
10	10	(France) Benjamin Lariche	17	+28.853	18	1
11	77	(Poland) Natalia Kowalska	17	+40.783	17	
12	8	(Bulgaria) Plamen Kralev	17	+48.939	21	
13	28	(India) Ajith Kumar	15	+2 Laps	20	
14	9	(Romania) Mihai Marinescu	15	+2 Laps	6	
Ret	17	(Denmark) Johan Jokinen	12	DNF	3	
Ret	4	(Belgium) Benjamin Bailly	0	DNF	13	
Ret	19	(Italy) Nicola de Marco	0	DNF	8	
Ret	7	(Russia) Ivan Samarin	0	DNF	15	
Ret	5	(Angola) Ricardo Teixeira	0	DNF	19	
Ret	26	(India) Parthiva Sureshwaren	0	DNF	16	
Ret	11	(United Kingdom) Jack Clarke	0	DNF	7	
Fastest lap: Dean Stoneman 1:31.312 (179.18 km/h) on lap 16

== Standings after the race ==
Drivers' Championship standings

Pos	Driver	Points
1	(Austria) Philipp Eng	80
2	(United Kingdom) Dean Stoneman	61
3	(United Kingdom) Jolyon Palmer	53
4	(United Kingdom) Will Bratt	33
5	(Russia) Sergey Afanasyev	33
