= 2010 Monza Formula Two round =

(Italy) 2010 Monza Formula Two round
Round details
- Round 3 of 9 in the 2010 FIA Formula Two Championship.
- Location: Autodromo Nazionale Monza, Italy
- Course: Permanent race circuit 5.793 km (3.600 mi)

First race
- Date: May 22 2010
- Laps: 21
Pole position
- Driver: (United Kingdom) Jolyon Palmer
- Time: 1:41.722
Podium
- First: (United Kingdom) Jolyon Palmer
- Second: (United Kingdom) Dean Stoneman
- Third: (Lithuania) Kazim Vasiliauskas
Fastest lap
- Driver: (Denmark) Johan Jokinen
- Time: 1:41.416 (on lap 6)

Second race
- Date: May 23 2010
- Laps: 18
Pole position
- Driver: (United Kingdom) Jolyon Palmer
- Time: 1:39.935
Podium
- First: (United Kingdom) Jolyon Palmer
- Second: (Russia) Sergey Afanasyev
- Third: (United Kingdom) Will Bratt
Fastest lap
- Driver: (Romania) Mihai Marinescu
- Time: 1:41.439

The 2010 Monza Formula Two round is the third round of the 2010 FIA Formula Two Championship season. It will be held on May 22, 2010 and May 23, 2010 at the Autodromo Nazionale Monza, Italy.

== Classification ==
=== Qualifying 1 ===
Pos	No	Name	Time	Grid
1	3	(United Kingdom) Jolyon Palmer	1:41.722	1
2	17	(Denmark) Johan Jokinen	1:41.796	2
3	9	(Romania) Mihai Marinescu	1:41.910	3
4	21	(Lithuania) Kazim Vasiliauskas	1:41.954	4
5	19	(Italy) Nicola de Marco	1:42.079	5
6	5	(Angola) Ricardo Teixeira	1:42.151	6
7	6	(India) Armaan Ebrahim	1:42.192	7
8	48	(United Kingdom) Dean Stoneman	1:42.275	8
9	11	(United Kingdom) Jack Clarke	1:42.348	9
10	2	(United Kingdom) Will Bratt	1:42.362	10
11	33	(Austria) Philipp Eng	1:42.382	11
12	12	(Netherlands) Kelvin Snoeks	1:42.416	12
13	4	(Belgium) Benjamin Bailly	1:42.449	13
14	10	(France) Benjamin Lariche	1:42.512	14
15	27	(United Kingdom) Paul Rees	1:42.675	15
16	7	(Russia) Ivan Samarin	1:42.689	16
17	8	(Bulgaria) Plamen Kralev	1:43.342	17
18	77	(Poland) Natalia Kowalska	1:43.553	18
19	26	(India) Parthiva Sureshwaren	1:43.701	19
20	28	(India) Ajith Kumar	1:46.790	20
21	14	(Russia) Sergey Afanasyev	No time	21

=== Qualifying 2 ===
Pos	No	Name	Time	Grid
1	3	(United Kingdom) Jolyon Palmer	1:39.935	1
2	14	(Russia) Sergey Afanasyev	1:40.187	2
3	2	(United Kingdom) Will Bratt	1:40.258	3
4	33	(Austria) Philipp Eng	1:40.390	4
5	9	(Romania) Mihai Marinescu	1:40.398	5
6	12	(Netherlands) Kelvin Snoeks	1:40.401	6
7	19	(Italy) Nicola de Marco	1:40.415	7
8	21	(Lithuania) Kazim Vasiliauskas	1:40.455	8
9	17	(Denmark) Johan Jokinen	1:40.485	9
10	48	(United Kingdom) Dean Stoneman	1:40.485	10
11	10	(France) Benjamin Lariche	1:40.610	11
12	7	(Russia) Ivan Samarin	1:40.915	12
13	26	(India) Parthiva Sureshwaren	1:40.996	13
14	11	(United Kingdom) Jack Clarke	1:41.182	14
15	4	(Belgium) Benjamin Bailly	1:41.213	15
16	6	(India) Armaan Ebrahim	1:41.290	16
17	27	(United Kingdom) Paul Rees	1:41.669	17
18	5	(Angola) Ricardo Teixeira	1:41.778	18
19	77	(Poland) Natalia Kowalska	1:42.761	19
20	8	(Bulgaria) Plamen Kralev	1:42.975	20
21	28	(India) Ajith Kumar	1:45.228	21

=== Race 1 ===
Pos	No	Driver	Laps	Time/Retired	Grid	Points
1	43	(United Kingdom) Jolyon Palmer	21	38:49.352	1	25
2	48	(United Kingdom) Dean Stoneman	21	+0.812	8	18
3	21	(Lithuania) Kazim Vasiliauskas	21	+5.010	4	15
4	2	(United Kingdom) Will Bratt	21	+5.750	10	12
5	9	(Romania) Mihai Marinescu	21	+11.671	3	10
6	4	(Belgium) Benjamin Bailly	21	+12.857	13	8
7	17	(Denmark) Johan Jokinen	21	+16.708	2	6
8	10	(France) Benjamin Lariche	21	+22.610	14	4
9	27	(United Kingdom) Paul Rees	21	+24.033	15	2
10	8	(Bulgaria) Plamen Kralev	21	+26.196	17	1
11	33	(Austria) Philipp Eng	21	+26.907	11	
12	7	(Russia) Ivan Samarin	21	+29.867	16	
13	12	(Netherlands) Kelvin Snoeks	21	+35.673	12	
14	28	(India) Ajith Kumar	21	+1:10.141	20	
15	26	(India) Parthiva Sureshwaren	20	+1 Lap	19	
16	5	(Angola) Ricardo Teixeira	19	+2 Laps	6	
17	14	(Russia) Sergey Afanasyev	18	+3 Laps	21	
Ret	11	(United Kingdom) Jack Clarke	7	DNF	9	
Ret	77	(Poland) Natalia Kowalska	5	DNF	18	
Ret	6	(India) Armaan Ebrahim	0	DNF	7	
Ret	19	(Italy) Nicola de Marco	0	DNF	5	
Fastest lap: Johan Jokinen 1:41.416 (205.63 km/h) on lap 6

=== Race 2 ===
Pos	No	Driver	Laps	Time/Retired	Grid	Points
1	43	(United Kingdom) Jolyon Palmer	18	30:51.520	1	25
2	14	(Russia) Sergey Afanasyev	18	+3.917	2	18
3	2	(United Kingdom) Will Bratt	18	+4.413	3	15
4	48	(United Kingdom) Dean Stoneman	18	+11.031	10	12
5	6	(India) Armaan Ebrahim	18	+13.435	16	10
6	4	(Belgium) Benjamin Bailly	18	+14.491	15	8
7	27	(United Kingdom) Paul Rees	18	+15.455	17	6
8	7	(Russia) Ivan Samarin	18	+20.904	12	4
9	10	(France) Benjamin Lariche	18	+22.313	11	2
10	26	(India) Parthiva Sureshwaren	18	+22.748	13	1
11	8	(Bulgaria) Plamen Kralev	18	+23.468	20	
12	11	(United Kingdom) Jack Clarke	18	+27.505	14	
13	5	(Angola) Ricardo Teixeira	18	+41.184	18	
14	77	(Poland) Natalia Kowalska	18	+42.220	19	
15	28	(India) Ajith Kumar	18	+1:26.685	21	
16	9	(Romania) Mihai Marinescu	16	+2 Laps	5	
DSQ	12	(Netherlands) Kelvin Snoeks	15	DSQ	6	
Ret	33	(Austria) Philipp Eng	3	DNF	4	
Ret	17	(Denmark) Johan Jokinen	1	DNF	9	
Ret	21	(Lithuania) Kazim Vasiliauskas	1	DNF	8	
Ret	19	(Italy) Nicola de Marco	0	DNF	7	
Fastest lap: Mihai Marinescu 1:41.439 (205.59 km/h) on lap 7

== Standings after the race ==
Drivers' Championship standings

Pos	Driver	Points
1	(United Kingdom) Jolyon Palmer	103
2	(United Kingdom) Dean Stoneman	91
3	(Austria) Philipp Eng	80
4	(United Kingdom) Will Bratt	60
5	(Russia) Sergey Afanasyev	51
