= Ramón Piñeiro =

Spanish racing driver

- Nationality: (Spain) Spanish
- Born: Ramón Piñeiro Llagostera; 29 October 1991 (age 35) Barcelona, Spain

FIA Formula Two Championship career
- Debut season: 2010
- Current team: 1
- Categorisation: FIA Gold
- Car number: 15
- Starts: 16
- Wins: 3
- Poles: 1
- Fastest laps: 1
- Best finish: 3rd in 2011

Previous series
- 2008-09 2009-10: Formula BMW Europe; Formula Palmer Audi

Ramón Piñeiro Llagostera (born 29 October 1991 in Barcelona) is a Spanish racing driver.

== Career ==
=== Formula BMW ===
Piñeiro began his formula racing career in 2008 in Formula BMW Europe with Fortec Motorsport. He finished twentieth in standings, taking five points-scoring positions in sixteen races. For 2009, Piñeiro remained in the series, but switched to FMS International. He again changed team to Motaworld Racing after Coloni took full control of the FMS International from Valencia onwards.

=== Formula Palmer Audi ===
After his FBMW campaign concluded in September, Piñeiro competed in the final two rounds of the Formula Palmer Audi championship at Silverstone and Snetterton. Piñeiro survived a big accident during the third of the Silverstone races. Running behind Kazim Vasiliauskas, Piñeiro picked up the slipstream from behind the Lithuanian driver's car. He clipped the rear wheel of the car after Vasiliauskas moved his car to defend into Stowe. Piñeiro was launched skywards, before landing and executing a barrel-roll before landing wheels up. He was unhurt. He finished third in the final race at Snetterton, three seconds behind winner Felix Rosenqvist, after an early crash took many of his rivals.

== Personal life ==
Piñeiro list his hobbies as all sports, fitness, music, while his favourite circuits are Valencia Street Circuit, Circuit de Monaco and Circuit de Spa-Francorchamps. His favourite driver is Michael Schumacher. He is currently studying automotive engineering with motorsport at the University of Hertfordshire, where he will continue his studies for another ten years.

== Racing record ==
=== Career summary ===
Season	Series	Team	Races	Wins	Poles	F/Laps	Podiums	Points	Position
2008	Formula BMW Europe	Fortec Motorsport	16	0	2	1	0	37	20th
2009	Formula BMW Europe	FMS International	10	0	0	0	0	38	19th
2009	Formula BMW Europe	Motaworld Racing	6	0	0	0	0	38	19th
2009	Formula Palmer Audi	Motorsport Vision	6	0	0	0	1	56	20th
2010	Formula Palmer Audi	MotorSport Vision	20	4	1	2	11	320	**3rd**
2010	European F3 Open	Team West-Tec	2	0	0	0	0	0	22nd
2010	European F3 Open - Copa de España	Team West-Tec	2	0	0	0	0	8	10th
2010	FIA Formula Two Championship	MotorSport Vision	2	0	0	0	0	1	22nd
2011	FIA Formula Two Championship	MotorSport Vision	16	3	2	1	7	185	**3rd**

=== Complete FIA Formula Two Championship results ===
(key) (Races in bold indicate pole position) (Races in italics indicate fastest lap)

Year	1	2	3	4	5	6	7	8	9	10	11	12	13	14	15	16	17	18	Pos	Points
2010	SIL; 1	SIL; 2	MAR; 1	MAR; 2	MON; 1	MON; 2	ZOL; 1	ZOL; 2	ALG; 1	ALG; 2	BRH; 1	BRH; 2	BRN; 1	BRN; 2	OSC; 1	OSC; 2	VAL; 1; 15	VAL; 2; 10	22nd	1
2011	SIL; 1; 5	SIL; 2; 11	MAG; 1; 5	MAG; 2; 9	**SPA**; **1**; 7	SPA; 2; 12	NÜR; 1; 14	NÜR; 2; 10	BRH; 1; 2	BRH; 2; 1	**RBR**; **1**; 1	RBR; 2; 1	MON; 1; 4	MON; 2; 2	CAT; 1; 3	CAT; 2; 2			**3rd**	**185**
