= 2010 Brno Formula Two round =

Formula Two race in 2010

(Czech Republic) 2010 Brno Formula Two round
Round details
- Round 7 of 9 in the 2010 FIA Formula Two Championship.
- Location: Brno, Czech Republic
- Course: Permanent race circuit 5.403 km (3.357 mi)

First race
- Date: July 31 2010
- Laps: 20
Pole position
- Driver: (United Kingdom) Dean Stoneman
- Time: 1:45.597
Podium
- First: (Italy) Nicola de Marco
- Second: (United Kingdom) Dean Stoneman
- Third: (Russia) Sergey Afanasyev
Fastest lap
- Driver: (Italy) Nicola de Marco
- Time: 1:48.246 (on lap 4)

Second race
- Date: August 1 2010
- Laps: 17
Pole position
- Driver: (United Kingdom) Dean Stoneman
- Time: 1:45.683
Podium
- First: (United Kingdom) Jolyon Palmer
- Second: (United Kingdom) Dean Stoneman
- Third: (Lithuania) Kazim Vasiliauskas
Fastest lap
- Driver: (United Kingdom) Jolyon Palmer
- Time: 1:48.913 (on lap 3)

The 2010 Brno Formula Two round was the seventh round of the 2010 FIA Formula Two Championship and was held on July 31 and August 1, 2010 at the Masaryk Circuit, Brno, Czech Republic. Nicola de Marco won the first 20-lap race from second position, earning his first series victory. Dean Stoneman, the pole position starter of the round, finished in second position and Sergey Afanasyev was third. Jolyon Palmer took the win in the second 19-lap race from a second position start. Stoneman took second place and Kazim Vasiliauskas finished third.

== Classification ==
=== Qualifying 1 ===
Pos	No.	Name	Time	Grid
1	48	Dean Stoneman	1:45.597	1
2	19	Nicola de Marco	1:45.642	2
3	14	Sergey Afanasyev	1:45.921	3
4	4	Benjamin Bailly	1:46.102	4
5	3	Jolyon Palmer	1:46.142	5
6	33	Philipp Eng	1:46.212	6
7	12	Kelvin Snoeks	1:46.273	7
8	24	Tom Gladdis	1:46.308	8
9	5	Ricardo Teixeira	1:46.611	9
10	2	Will Bratt	1:46.612	10
11	9	Mihai Marinescu	1:46.626	11
12	11	Jack Clarke	1:46.709	12
13	10	Benjamin Lariche	1:46.773	13
14	6	Armaan Ebrahim	1:46.812	14
15	12	Kazim Vasiliauskas	1:46.925	15
16	77	Natalia Kowalska	1:46.964	16
17	7	Ivan Samarin	1:46.984	17
18	28	Julian Theobald	1:47.670	18
19	8	Plamen Kralev	1:48.135	19

=== Qualifying 2 ===
Pos	No.	Name	Time	Grid
1	48	Dean Stoneman	1:45.683	1
2	3	Jolyon Palmer	1:46.126	2
3	33	Philipp Eng	1:46.144	3
4	21	Kazim Vasiliauskas	1:46.202	4
5	19	Nicola de Marco	1:46.302	5
6	14	Sergey Afanasyev	1:46.730	6
7	10	Benjamin Lariche	1:46.836	7
8	4	Benjamin Bailly	1:46.864	8
9	2	Will Bratt	1:46.961	9
10	9	Mihai Marinescu	1:46.980	10
11	24	Tom Gladdis	1:47.048	11
12	12	Kelvin Snoeks	1:47.087	12
13	6	Armaan Ebrahim	1:47.187	13
14	11	Jack Clarke	1:47.270	14
15	7	Ivan Samarin	1:47.328	15
16	28	Julian Theobald	1:47.923	16
17	5	Ricardo Teixeira	1:47.964	17
18	77	Natalia Kowalska	1:48.244	18
19	8	Plamen Kralev	1:48.373	19

=== Race 1 ===
Pos	No	Driver	Laps	Time/Retired	Grid	Points
1	19	Nicola de Marco	20	36:20.232	2	25
2	48	Dean Stoneman	20	+3.090	1	18
3	14	Sergey Afanasyev	20	+5.793	3	15
4	4	Benjamin Bailly	20	+7.955	4	12
5	3	Jolyon Palmer	20	+13.976	5	10
6	33	Philipp Eng	20	+18.225	6	8
7	12	Kelvin Snoeks	20	+22.877	7	6
8	2	Will Bratt	20	+23.437	10	4
9	5	Ricardo Teixeira	20	+27.931	9	2
10	10	Benjamin Lariche	20	+28.668	13	1
11	21	Kazim Vasiliauskas	20	+31.507	15	
12	24	Tom Gladdis	20	+35.125	8	
13	28	Julian Theobald	20	+51.216	18	
14	7	Ivan Samarin	20	+53.320	17	
15	8	Plamen Kralev	20	+1:08.359	19	
16	9	Mihai Marinescu	20	+1:25.435	11	
Ret	77	Natalia Kowalska	13	Did not finish	16	
Ret	11	Jack Clarke	0	Did not finish	12	
Ret	6	Armaan Ebrahim	0	Did not finish	14	

=== Race 2 ===
Pos	No	Driver	Laps	Time/Retired	Grid	Points
1	3	Jolyon Palmer	17	31:04.799	2	25
2	48	Dean Stoneman	17	+2.194	1	18
3	21	Kazim Vasiliauskas	17	+11.258	4	15
4	14	Sergey Afanasyev	17	+12.805	6	12
5	4	Benjamin Bailly	17	+14.156	8	10
6	19	Nicola de Marco	17	+19.813	5	8
7	10	Benjamin Lariche	17	+20.953	7	6
8	12	Kelvin Snoeks	17	+21.517	12	4
9	11	Jack Clarke	17	+24.268	14	2
10	2	Will Bratt	17	+26.292	9	1
11	9	Mihai Marinescu	17	+30.509	10	
12	24	Tom Gladdis	17	+30.950	11	
13	6	Armaan Ebrahim	17	+33.897	13	
14	77	Natalia Kowalska	17	+39.745	16	
15	28	Julian Theobald	17	+43.701	16	
16	7	Ivan Samarin	17	+52.871	15	
17	8	Plamen Kralev	17	+1:05.803	19	
18	33	Philipp Eng	15	+2 Laps	3	
Ret	5	Ricardo Teixeira	2	Did not finish	17	
