= 2010 Oschersleben Formula Two round =

Formula Two race in 2010

(Germany) 2010 Oschersleben Formula Two round
Round details
- Round 8 of 9 in the 2010 FIA Formula Two Championship.
- Location: Motorsport Arena Oschersleben, Germany
- Course: Permanent race circuit 3.696 km (2.297 mi)

First race
- Date: September 4 2010
- Laps: 24
Pole position
- Driver: (Russia) Sergey Afanasyev
- Time: 1:20.376
Podium
- First: (United Kingdom) Dean Stoneman
- Second: (Lithuania) Kazim Vasiliauskas
- Third: (United Kingdom) Jolyon Palmer
Fastest lap
- Driver: (Italy) Nicola de Marco
- Time: 1:39.164 (on lap 19)

Second race
- Date: September 5 2010
- Laps: 23
Pole position
- Driver: (United Kingdom) Dean Stoneman
- Time: 1:22.314
Podium
- First: (United Kingdom) Dean Stoneman
- Second: (Lithuania) Kazim Vasiliauskas
- Third: (Russia) Sergey Afanasyev
Fastest lap
- Driver: (Lithuania) Kazim Vasiliauskas
- Time: 1:21.578 (on lap 6)

The 2010 Oschersleben Formula Two round was the eighth round of the 2010 FIA Formula Two Championship and was held from September 4 and 5, 2010 at the Motorsport Arena Oschersleben, Oschersleben, Germany. Dean Stoneman won the first race on September 4, which took place over a distance of 24 laps, from fifth place. Kazim Vasiliauskas finished second and Jolyon Palmer took third. Stoneman won the second 23-lap event on 5 September from pole position. Vasiliauskas placed second and Sergey Afanasyev was third.

== Classification ==
=== Qualifying 1 ===
Pos	No.	Name	Time	Grid
1	14	Sergey Afanasyev	1:20.376	1
2	21	Kazim Vasiliauskas	1:20.476	2
3	19	Nicola de Marco	1:20.672	3
4	4	Benjamin Bailly	1:20.698	4
5	48	Dean Stoneman	1:20.784	5
6	2	Will Bratt	1:20.838	6
7	11	Jack Clarke	1:20.871	7
8	3	Jolyon Palmer	1:20.916	8
9	33	Philipp Eng	1:20.957	9
10	9	Mihai Marinescu	1:21.041	10
11	6	Armaan Ebrahim	1:21.097	11
12	12	Kelvin Snoeks	1:21.183	12
13	7	Ivan Samarin	1:21.330	13
14	5	Ricardo Teixeira	1:21.380	14
15	10	Benjamin Lariche	1:21.531	15
16	28	Julian Theobald	1:21.620	16
17	22	Johannes Theobald	1:21.759	17
18	8	Plamen Kralev	1:22.178	18

=== Qualifying 2 ===
Pos	No.	Name	Time	Grid
1	48	Dean Stoneman	1:22.314	1
2	19	Nicola de Marco	1:22.370	2
3	21	Kazim Vasiliauskas	1:22.395	3
4	14	Sergey Afanasyev	1:22.730	4
5	4	Benjamin Bailly	1:23.039	5
6	2	Will Bratt	1:23.040	6
7	12	Kelvin Snoeks	1:23.045	7
8	9	Mihai Marinescu	1:23.142	8
9	10	Benjamin Lariche	1:23.493	9
10	33	Philipp Eng	1:23.613	10
11	5	Ricardo Teixeira	1:23.650	11
12	6	Armaan Ebrahim	1:23.992	12
13	7	Ivan Samarin	1:24.173	13
14	3	Jolyon Palmer	1:24.331	14
15	22	Johannes Theobald	1:24.582	15
16	28	Julian Theobald	1:25.289	16
17	8	Plamen Kralev	1:29.043	17
18	11	Jack Clarke	1:34.298	18

=== Race 1 ===
Pos	No	Driver	Laps	Time/Retired	Grid	Points
1	48	Dean Stoneman	24	40:11.982	5	25
2	21	Kazim Vasiliauskas	24	+15.793	2	18
3	3	Jolyon Palmer	24	+16.466	8	15
4	14	Sergey Afanasyev	24	+26.958	1	12
5	4	Benjamin Bailly	24	+37.213	4	10
6	2	Will Bratt	24	+43.993	6	8
7	33	Philipp Eng	24	+50.776	9	6
8	12	Kelvin Snoeks	24	+58.995	12	4
9	19	Nicola de Marco	24	+1:18.033	3	2
10	5	Ricardo Teixeira	24	+1:21.057	14	1
11	6	Armaan Ebrahim	24	+1:26.575	11	
12	11	Jack Clarke	24	+1:39.621	7	
13	9	Mihai Marinescu	24	+1:40.132	10	
14	28	Julian Theobald	23	+1 Lap	16	
15	8	Plamen Kralev	23	+2 Lap	18	
16	22	Johannes Theobald	22	+3 Laps	17	
Ret	7	Ivan Samarin	12	Did not finish	13	
Ret	10	Benjamin Lariche	6	Did not finish	15	

=== Race 2 ===
Pos	No	Driver	Laps	Time/Retired	Grid	Points
1	48	Dean Stoneman	23	31:40.254	1	25
2	21	Kazim Vasiliauskas	23	+1.966	3	18
3	14	Sergey Afanasyev	23	+6.889	4	15
4	12	Kelvin Snoeks	23	+13.036	7	12
5	4	Benjamin Bailly	23	+16.245	5	10
6	9	Mihai Marinescu	23	+17.076	8	8
7	2	Will Bratt	23	+17.689	6	6
8	7	Ivan Samarin	23	+24.617	13	4
9	33	Philipp Eng	23	+24.901	10	2
10	6	Armaan Ebrahim	23	+25.457	12	1
11	10	Benjamin Lariche	23	+25.990	9	
12	3	Jolyon Palmer	23	+28.568	14	
13	22	Johannes Theobald	23	+32.021	15	
14	8	Plamen Kralev	23	+37.575	17	
15	19	Nicola de Marco	20	+3 Laps	2	
16	5	Ricardo Teixeira	20	+3 Laps	11	
Ret	28	Julian Theobald	1	Did not finish	16	
Ret	11	Jack Clarke	0	Did not finish	18	
