= 2008 Formula Renault 2.0 Northern European Cup =

Motor racing championship

2008 Formula Renault 2.0 NEC

Seasons
- ← 2007 2009 →

The 2008 Formula Renault 2.0 Northern European Cup was the third Formula Renault 2.0 Northern European Cup season. The season began at Hockenheim on 26 April and finished on 5 October at Spa, after sixteen races.

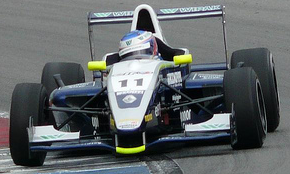
Valtteri Bottas during the championship

Motopark Academy driver Valtteri Bottas won the NEC championship title, having won twelve races during the season, bringing the team their third successive drivers' championship title. His teammates António Félix da Costa and Tobias Hegewald, completed the top three, for the team's second consecutive championship title.

== Drivers and teams ==
Team	No.	Driver name	Rounds
(Finland) Koiranen bros.	2	(Finland) Daniel Aho	All
(Finland) Koiranen bros.	3	(Netherlands) Bart Hylkema	All
(Finland) Koiranen bros.	44	(Finland) Toomas Heikkinen	8
(Germany) GU-Racing	5	(Germany) Maximilian Wissel	1–4
(Germany) GU-Racing	6	(Colombia) Carlos Gaitán Quinones	1–4
(Denmark) KEO Racing	7	(Sweden) Kevin Kleveros	All
(Denmark) KEO Racing	8	(United States) Robert Siska	7
(Germany) Motopark Academy	10	(Germany) Tobias Hegewald	1–3, 5–8
(Germany) Motopark Academy	11	(Finland) Valtteri Bottas	1–3, 5–8
(Germany) Motopark Academy	12	(Denmark) Johan Jokinen	All
(Germany) Motopark Academy	13	(Portugal) António Félix da Costa	All
(Germany) Motopark Academy	14	(Brazil) Vinicius Samarone	All
(Germany) Motopark Academy	22	(Poland) Kuba Giermaziak	1–3, 5–8
(Germany) Motopark Academy	23	(Mexico) Juan Pablo García	1–7
(Netherlands) AR Motorsport	15	(Netherlands) Kelvin Snoeks	All
(Netherlands) AR Motorsport	16	(Netherlands) Thomas Knopper	All
(Netherlands) AR Motorsport	17	(South Africa) Arnold Neveling	4–8
(Netherlands) AR Motorsport	36	(Sweden) Philip Forsman	7–8
(Czech Republic) TL Motorsport	18	(Czech Republic) Martin Tlusty	1–2, 4–5, 8
(Czech Republic) Krenek Motorsport	19	(Czech Republic) Adam Kout	7–8
(Czech Republic) Krenek Motorsport	28	(Czech Republic) Jakub Knoll	All
(Czech Republic) Krenek Motorsport	29	(France) Laurent Stieger	2–4, 7
(Netherlands) Van Amersfoort Racing	20	(Netherlands) Stef Dusseldorp	All
(Netherlands) Van Amersfoort Racing	21	(Netherlands) Nigel Melker	All
(Mexico) MEX Motopark	23	(Mexico) Juan Pablo García	8
(Netherlands) MP Motorsport	25	(Netherlands) Daniël de Jong	All
(Netherlands) MP Motorsport	26	(Poland) Mateusz Adamski	1–3, 5–8
(Netherlands) MP Motorsport	27	(Netherlands) Nicky Catsburg	All
(Austria) Steiner Motorsport	30	(Austria) Bianca Steiner	1–2, 4, 8
(Finland) Kart Motorsport	30	(Finland) Jesse Laine	3
(Finland) P1 Motorsport	31	(Finland) Jesse Krohn	3
(Germany) SL Formula	32	(Germany) Marlene Dietrich	All
(Sweden) Trakstar Racing	36	(Sweden) Philip Forsman	1–6
(Sweden) Trakstar Racing	37	(Sweden) Daniel Ivarson	2, 4, 8
(Finland) Wikman	44	(Finland) Juha-Pekka Wikman	3
(Finland) Red Step Formula	45	(Finland) Ville Miilumäki	3
(Finland) Red Step Formula	46	(Finland) Toomas Heikkinen	3
(United Kingdom) Fortec Motorsport	50	(United Kingdom) James Calado	6, 8
(United Kingdom) Fortec Motorsport	51	(United Kingdom) Oliver Webb	6, 8
(United Kingdom) Fortec Motorsport	55	(United Kingdom) Alexander Morgan	8
(United Kingdom) Double M Racing	55	(United Kingdom) Alexander Morgan	5, 7

== Race calendar and results ==
Round		Circuit	Date	Pole position	Fastest lap	Winning driver	Winning team	Event
1	R1	(Germany) Hockenheimring	26 April	(Finland) Valtteri Bottas	(Finland) Valtteri Bottas	(Finland) Valtteri Bottas	(Germany) Motopark Academy	Jim Clark Revival
1	R2	(Germany) Hockenheimring	27 April	(Finland) Valtteri Bottas	(Finland) Valtteri Bottas	(Finland) Valtteri Bottas	(Germany) Motopark Academy	Jim Clark Revival
2	R1	(Netherlands) Circuit Park Zandvoort	31 May	(Finland) Valtteri Bottas	(Finland) Valtteri Bottas	(Finland) Valtteri Bottas	(Germany) Motopark Academy	Jubileum Races
2	R2	(Netherlands) Circuit Park Zandvoort	1 June	(Finland) Valtteri Bottas	(Germany) Tobias Hegewald	(Finland) Valtteri Bottas	(Germany) Motopark Academy	Jubileum Races
3	R1	(Finland) Alastaro Circuit	14 June	(Finland) Valtteri Bottas	(Denmark) Johan Jokinen	(Finland) Valtteri Bottas	(Germany) Motopark Academy	Formula Renault 2.0 Finland
3	R2	(Finland) Alastaro Circuit	15 June	(Finland) Valtteri Bottas	(Finland) Valtteri Bottas	(Finland) Valtteri Bottas	(Germany) Motopark Academy	Formula Renault 2.0 Finland
4	R1	(Germany) Motorsport Arena Oschersleben	6 July	(Portugal) António Félix da Costa	(Portugal) António Félix da Costa	(Portugal) António Félix da Costa	(Germany) Motopark Academy	FIA GT Oschersleben 2 Hours
4	R2	(Germany) Motorsport Arena Oschersleben	7 July	(Denmark) Johan Jokinen	(Denmark) Johan Jokinen	(Denmark) Johan Jokinen	(Germany) Motopark Academy	FIA GT Oschersleben 2 Hours
5	R1	(Netherlands) TT Circuit Assen	2 August	(Finland) Valtteri Bottas	(Finland) Valtteri Bottas	(Finland) Valtteri Bottas	(Germany) Motopark Academy	Rizla Racing Day
5	R2	(Netherlands) TT Circuit Assen	3 August	(Finland) Valtteri Bottas	(Finland) Valtteri Bottas	(Finland) Valtteri Bottas	(Germany) Motopark Academy	Rizla Racing Day
6	R1	(Belgium) Circuit Zolder	9 August	(Finland) Valtteri Bottas	(Finland) Valtteri Bottas	(Netherlands) Stef Dusseldorp	(Netherlands) Van Amersfoort Racing	Masters of Formula 3
6	R2	(Belgium) Circuit Zolder	10 August	(Finland) Valtteri Bottas	(Finland) Valtteri Bottas	(Germany) Tobias Hegewald	(Germany) Motopark Academy	Masters of Formula 3
7	R1	(Germany) Nürburgring	30 August	(Finland) Valtteri Bottas	(Finland) Valtteri Bottas	(Finland) Valtteri Bottas	(Germany) Motopark Academy	World Series by Renault
7	R2	(Germany) Nürburgring	31 August	(Finland) Valtteri Bottas	(Finland) Valtteri Bottas	(Finland) Valtteri Bottas	(Germany) Motopark Academy	World Series by Renault
8	R1	(Belgium) Circuit de Spa-Francorchamps	4 October	(Germany) Tobias Hegewald	(Finland) Valtteri Bottas	(Finland) Valtteri Bottas	(Germany) Motopark Academy	Spa Racing Festival
8	R2	(Belgium) Circuit de Spa-Francorchamps	5 October	(Finland) Valtteri Bottas	(Finland) Valtteri Bottas	(Finland) Valtteri Bottas	(Germany) Motopark Academy	Spa Racing Festival

== Standings ==
Race point system
Position	1st	2nd	3rd	4th	5th	6th	7th	8th	9th	10th	9th	10th	12th	13th	14th	15th	17th	18th	19th	20th
Points	30	24	20	17	16	15	14	13	12	11	10	9	8	7	6	5	4	3	2	1

Points are awarded only based on position. There are 2 races by rounds, each 25 minutes.

Pos	Driver	HOC (Germany)		ZAN (Netherlands)		ALA (Finland)		OSC (Germany)		ASS (Netherlands)		ZOL (Belgium)		NÜR (Germany)		SPA (Belgium)		Points
Pos	Driver	1	2	3	4	5	6	7	8	9	10	11	12	13	14	15	16	Points
1	(Finland) Valtteri Bottas	1	1	1	1	1	1			1	1	Ret	16†	1	1	1	1	365
2	(Portugal) António Félix da Costa	3	20	2	3	14	2	1	2	3	4	2	3	7	22	3	6	279
3	(Germany) Tobias Hegewald	2	19†	9	2	2	3			10	3	3	1	3	2	2	16	260
4	(Netherlands) Stef Dusseldorp	5	2	13	5	4	9	Ret	9	Ret	6	1	2	4	5	14	11	224
5	(Denmark) Johan Jokinen	6	3	4	4	20	4	3	1	Ret	18	6	5	5	3	15	9	224
6	(Poland) Kuba Giermaziak	4	4	3	21	3	7			2	2	7	Ret	2	4	6	27†	206
7	(Finland) Daniel Aho	13	7	Ret	16	Ret	Ret	2	3	15	8	8	7	6	6	8	8	173
8	(Netherlands) Nicky Catsburg	Ret	5	5	18	5	11	Ret	13	4	22†	4	10	15	15	4	3	163
9	(Netherlands) Kelvin Snoeks	10	10	7	8	11	Ret	7	10	7	12	17	13	16	16	13	14	140
10	(Netherlands) Thomas Knopper	12	6	16	10	9	14	8	11	9	13	14	12	14	10	18	12	140
11	(Netherlands) Bart Hylkema	11	9	15	14	7	Ret	5	7	11	9	16	4	10	Ret	Ret	21	134
12	(Netherlands) Nigel Melker	DNS	Ret	10	22	Ret	8	12	6	14	Ret	10	9	8	8	11	15	120
13	(Netherlands) Daniël de Jong	20	12	20	13	17	12	6	8	8	16	15	6	9	14	Ret	20	118
14	(Brazil) Vinicius Samarone	16	Ret	11	9	Ret	10	10	5	12	15	18	Ret	12	7	12	22	115
15	(Sweden) Philip Forsman	9	8	12	Ret	16	15	11	21†	Ret	10	Ret	8	17	12	10	18	106
16	(Mexico) Juan Pablo Garcia	7	21	8	6	21	6			13	7	9	Ret	22	Ret	16	13	104
17	(Poland) Mateusz Adamski	22	11	23†	7	12	Ret			5	21	13	Ret	11	11	9	10	100
18	(Germany) Maximilian Wissel	8	Ret	6	Ret	6	5	4	4									93
19	(South Africa) Arnold Neveling							14	19	6	11	11	Ret	13	13	17	7	78
20	(Sweden) Kevin Kleveros	17	15	18	11	8	13	20	12	18	14	Ret	11	23	21	Ret	DNS	74
21	(Germany) Marlene Dietrich	15	16	Ret	15	13	17	17	16	19	17	19	14	19	17	25	25	59
22	(United Kingdom) Alexander Morgan									Ret	5			24	Ret	7	2	54
23	(Austria) Bianca Steiner	14	13	14	12			13	15							24	24	45
24	(Colombia) Carlos Gaitán Quinones	19	14	19	17	15	18	9	14									43
25	(United Kingdom) James Calado											5	15†			DNS	5	38
26	(Czech Republic) Jakub Knoll	21†	18	17	19	Ret	19	18	18	16	19	20	Ret	18	18	23	26	31
27	(United Kingdom) Oliver Webb											12	Ret			5	4	25
28	(Czech Republic) Martin Tlusty	18	17	21	20			15	17	17	20					20	23	24
29	(Czech Republic) Adam Kout													Ret	9	22	28†	12
30	(Finland) Jesse Krohn					10	Ret											11
31	(Finland) Toomas Heikkinen					18	16									19	19	10
32	(Sweden) Daniel Ivarson			Ret	DNS			16	20							21	17	6
33	(France) Laurent Stieger			22	23	24	21	19	22†					21	20			3
34	(United States) Robert Siska													20	19			3
35	(Finland) Ville Miilumäki					19	Ret											2
36	(Finland) Jesse Laine					22	20											1
37	(Finland) Juha-Pekka Wikman					23†	Ret											0
Pos	Driver	HOC (Germany)		ZAN (Netherlands)		ALA (Finland)		OSC (Germany)		ASS (Netherlands)		ZOL (Belgium)		NÜR (Germany)		SPA (Belgium)		Points

† — Drivers did not finish the race, but were classified as they completed over 90% of the race distance.
