= 2007 Formula Renault 2.0 Northern European Cup =

Motor racing championship

2007 Formula Renault 2.0 NEC

Seasons
- ← 2006 2008 →

The 2007 Formula Renault 2.0 Northern European Cup was the second Formula Renault 2.0 Northern European Cup season. The season began at Zandvoort on 28 May and finished on 21 October at Hockenheim, after sixteen races.

Motopark Academy driver Frank Kechele won the NEC championship title, having won eight races during the season, bringing the team their second successive drivers' championship title.

== Drivers and teams ==
Team	No.	Driver name	Rounds
(Finland) Koiranen Bros. Motorsport	2	(Finland) Valtteri Bottas	All
(Finland) Koiranen Bros. Motorsport	3	(Finland) Joonas Kostiainen	1–5
(Finland) Koiranen Bros. Motorsport	7	(Finland) Daniel Aho	6–8
(Germany) Motopark Academy	5	(United Kingdom) Oliver Oakes	1–7
(Germany) Motopark Academy	6	(Germany) Frank Kechele	1–7
(Germany) Motopark Academy	9	(Poland) Jakub Giermaziak	All
(Germany) Motopark Academy	10	(Poland) Andreij Gasenko	1
(Germany) Motopark Academy	11	(Finland) Joonas Mannerjärvi	2–4
(Germany) Motopark Academy	22	(Russia) Kirill Ovcharenko	5–8
(Germany) Motopark Academy	55	(United Kingdom) Adrian Quaife-Hobbs	6–7
(Germany) Motorsport Arena	7	(Italy) Fabio Onidi	1–5
(Germany) Motorsport Arena	8	(Germany) Tobias Hegewald	1–7
(Sweden) Synsam Racing	12	(Sweden) Pierre Selander	3
(Netherlands) AR Motorsport	14	(Netherlands) Paul Meijer	6–8
(Netherlands) AR Motorsport	15	(Netherlands) Kelvin Snoeks	All
(Netherlands) AR Motorsport	16	(Netherlands) Gwendolyn Hertzberger	All
(Netherlands) AR Motorsport	17	(Netherlands) Dennis Retera	1–6
(Netherlands) Van Amersfoort Racing	19	(Netherlands) Dennis Swart	All
(Netherlands) Van Amersfoort Racing	20	(Netherlands) Stef Dusseldorp	1–5
(Netherlands) MP Motorsport	26	(Netherlands) Romano de Ruit	1–5
(Netherlands) MP Motorsport	27	(Netherlands) Nicky Catsburg	All
(Denmark) Team Formula Sport	30	(Denmark) Steffen Møller	All
(Sweden) Trakstar Racing AB	32	(Sweden) Philip Forsman	1–2, 5–8
(Sweden) Trakstar Racing AB	33	(Sweden) Felix Rosenqvist	5
(Germany) Lohmann Motorsport	34	(Russia) David Sigachev	5–8
(Germany) SL Formula Racing	34	(Russia) David Sigachev	1–4
(Germany) SL Formula Racing	35	(Russia) Anton Nebylitskiy	1–5
(Germany) SL Formula Racing	36	(Brazil) Pedro Nunes	1–5
(Germany) SL Formula Racing	37	(Germany) Dimitri Raikhlin	5–8
(Germany) SL Formula Racing	77	(Poland) Natalia Kowalska	1–4
(Belgium) Speed Lover	38	(Netherlands) Frank Suntjens	All
(United Kingdom) Fortec Motorsport	40	(United Kingdom) Dean Smith	2
(United Kingdom) Fortec Motorsport	41	(Japan) Ryuji Yamamoto	2
(United Kingdom) Fortec Motorsport	42	(United Kingdom) Riki Christodoulou	2
(United Kingdom) Fortec Motorsport	43	(United Kingdom) Duncan Tappy	2
(United Kingdom) Borthwick Motorsport	44	(United Kingdom) Ryan Borthwick	1, 3, 8
(United Kingdom) AKA Cobra Racing	45	(Australia) Nathan Caratti	1, 3, 5, 8
(United Kingdom) AKA Cobra Racing	46	(United Kingdom) Adam Christodoulou	1, 3, 5, 8
(United Kingdom) Manor Competition	47	(United Kingdom) Alexander Sims	5
(Spain) Omicron Racing	49	(Andorra) Francesc Moreno	3–4
(Spain) Omicron Racing	50	(Germany) Pascal Kochem	4
(Switzerland) Jenzer Motorsport	69	(Norway) Pål Varhaug	7
(Switzerland) Jenzer Motorsport	166	(Switzerland) Ronnie Theiler	7
(Switzerland) Jenzer Motorsport	168	(Switzerland) Fabien Thuner	7
(Denmark) KEO Racing	84	(Sweden) Alexander Haegermark	1–5
(Denmark) KEO Racing	88	(Denmark) Johan Jokinen	2, 5–6

== Race calendar and results ==
Round		Circuit	Date	Pole position	Fastest lap	Winning driver	Winning team	Event
1	R1	(Netherlands) Circuit Park Zandvoort	28 May	(Germany) Frank Kechele	(Germany) Frank Kechele	(Germany) Frank Kechele	(Germany) Motopark Academy	Pinksterrace
1	R2	(Netherlands) Circuit Park Zandvoort	28 May	(Germany) Tobias Hegewald	(Finland) Valtteri Bottas	(Germany) Frank Kechele	(Germany) Motopark Academy	Pinksterrace
2	R1	(Germany) Motorsport Arena Oschersleben	7 July	(Germany) Frank Kechele	(Germany) Tobias Hegewald	(Germany) Frank Kechele	(Germany) Motopark Academy	FIA GT Oschersleben 2 Hours
2	R2	(Germany) Motorsport Arena Oschersleben	8 July	(United Kingdom) Riki Christodoulou	(United Kingdom) Riki Christodoulou	(United Kingdom) Riki Christodoulou	(United Kingdom) Fortec Motorsport	FIA GT Oschersleben 2 Hours
3	R1	(Netherlands) TT Circuit Assen	21 July	(Finland) Valtteri Bottas	(Germany) Tobias Hegewald	(Germany) Tobias Hegewald	(Germany) Motorsport Arena	Beru Top 10
3	R2	(Netherlands) TT Circuit Assen	22 July	(Germany) Frank Kechele	(Germany) Frank Kechele	(Germany) Frank Kechele	(Germany) Motopark Academy	Beru Top 10
4	R1	(Belgium) Circuit Zolder	4 August	(Germany) Frank Kechele	(Germany) Tobias Hegewald	(Germany) Frank Kechele	(Germany) Motopark Academy	Masters of Formula 3
4	R2	(Belgium) Circuit Zolder	5 August	(Germany) Frank Kechele	(Germany) Tobias Hegewald	(Germany) Frank Kechele	(Germany) Motopark Academy	Masters of Formula 3
5	R1	(Germany) Nürburgring	25 August	(Germany) Tobias Hegewald	(Germany) Frank Kechele	(Germany) Tobias Hegewald	(Germany) Motorsport Arena	Beru Top 10
5	R2	(Germany) Nürburgring	26 August	(Germany) Tobias Hegewald	(Germany) Frank Kechele	(Germany) Tobias Hegewald	(Germany) Motorsport Arena	Beru Top 10
6	R1	(Germany) Motorsport Arena Oschersleben	29 September	(Germany) Tobias Hegewald	(Germany) Tobias Hegewald	(Netherlands) Paul Meijer	(Netherlands) AR Motorsport	Beru Top 10
6	R2	(Germany) Motorsport Arena Oschersleben	30 September	(Germany) Frank Kechele	(Finland) Valtteri Bottas	(Germany) Frank Kechele	(Germany) Motopark Academy	Beru Top 10
7	R1	(Belgium) Circuit de Spa-Francorchamps	14 October	(Netherlands) Paul Meijer	(Netherlands) Paul Meijer	(Netherlands) Paul Meijer	(Netherlands) AR Motorsport	Spa Racing Festival
7	R2	(Belgium) Circuit de Spa-Francorchamps	14 October	(Germany) Frank Kechele	(Germany) Frank Kechele	(Germany) Frank Kechele	(Germany) Motopark Academy	Spa Racing Festival
8	R1	(Germany) Hockenheimring	21 October	(Netherlands) Paul Meijer	(Finland) Valtteri Bottas	(Finland) Valtteri Bottas	(Finland) Koiranen Bros. Motorsport	Beru Top 10
8	R2	(Germany) Hockenheimring	21 October	(Finland) Valtteri Bottas	(Netherlands) Paul Meijer	(Finland) Valtteri Bottas	(Finland) Koiranen Bros. Motorsport	Beru Top 10

== Standings ==
=== Drivers ===
Race point system
Position	1st	2nd	3rd	4th	5th	6th	7th	8th	9th	10th	9th	10th	12th	13th	14th	15th	17th	18th	19th	20th
Points	30	24	20	17	16	15	14	13	12	11	10	9	8	7	6	5	4	3	2	1

Pos	Driver name	ZAN (Netherlands)		OSC (Germany)		ASS (Netherlands)		ZOL (Belgium)		NÜR (Germany)		OSC (Germany)		SPA (Belgium)		HOC (Germany)		Points
Pos	Driver name	1	2	3	4	5	6	7	8	9	10	11	12	13	14	15	16	Points
1	(Germany) Frank Kechele	1	1	1	2	5	1	1	1	2	2	2	1	2	1			376
2	(Germany) Tobias Hegewald	3	3	2	4	1	2	2	2	1	1	5	7	Ret	3			297
3	(Finland) Valtteri Bottas	4	2	5	3	2	4	5	5	6	6	Ret	3	5	12	1	1	279
4	(United Kingdom) Oliver Oakes	8	5	Ret	5	3	Ret	3	3	3	3	6	4	4	5			191
5	(Denmark) Steffen Møller	11	4	8	7	7	17	7	Ret	8	7	18	6	7	6	5	6	189
6	(Netherlands) Nicky Catsburg	6	7	11	6	10	6	10	21†	15	13	7	21	8	10	4	12	170
7	(Netherlands) Paul Meijer											1	2	1	2	2	2	156
8	(United Kingdom) Adam Christodoulou	5	9			6	3			5	4					3	3	137
9	(Italy) Fabio Onidi	2	Ret	7	Ret	4	5	4	4	4	3							118
10	(Poland) Jakub Giermaziak	20	21	Ret	14	22†	8	16	11	10	8	9	Ret	10	20	17	13	97
11	(Sweden) Alexander Haegermark	13	14	9	Ret	8	7	9	6	Ret	9							94
12	(Netherlands) Dennis Retera	10	6	20	10	11	23†	Ret	12	14	23	12	13					82
13	(Netherlands) Stef Dusseldorp	9	8	10	20	23†	9	11	15	16	15							77
14	(Poland) Mateusz Adamski	Ret	DNS	15	19	Ret	21	17	17	23	14	13	11	12	16	10	11	76
15	(Netherlands) Romano de Ruit	7	10	14	15	15	Ret	13	10	11	Ret							74
16	(Sweden) Philip Forsman			18	21	DNS	14			12	17	10	9	14	21	9	14	72
17	(Netherlands) Dennis Swart	12	12	16	26	Ret	16	14	Ret	25	24	8	14	18	DNS	13	17	71
18	(United Kingdom) Adrian Quaife-Hobbs											4	5	3	4			70
19	(Germany) Dimitri Raikhlin									7	Ret	14	19	6	Ret	6	4	70
20	(Finland) Joonas Kostiainen	15	13	Ret	9	Ret	12	20†	7	13	11							69
21	(Russia) David Sigachev	Ret	16	Ret	13	24†	15	12	Ret	20	16	17	10	21	19	16	10	67
22	(Russia) Anton Nebylitskiy	Ret	15	12	Ret	NC	11	6	Ret	9	10							63
23	(Russia) Kirill Ovcharenko									Ret	22	Ret	8	9	8	8	9	63
24	(Sweden) Pierre Selander	19	18	DNS	17	19†	19	18	18	22	NC	3	20	17	17	14	Ret	56
25	(Australia) Nathan Caratti	16	17			9	20			18	Ret					7	5	56
26	(Netherlands) Kelvin Snoeks	17	Ret	Ret	22	14	DSQ	Ret	14	Ret	18	15	15	16	14	18	18	52
27	(Netherlands) Gwendolyn Hertzberger	21	23	19	23	16	Ret	19	19	Ret	20	16	16	15	11	15	15	51
28	(Finland) Daniel Aho											11	17	DNS	9	11	7	50
29	(Brazil) Pedro Nunes	Ret	20	17	12	12	Ret	Ret	9	19	12							46
30	(United Kingdom) Riki Christodoulou			6	1*													45
31	(Finland) Joonas Mannerjärvi			13	8	13	13	Ret	13									45
32	(United Kingdom) Ryan Borthwick	14	11			18	10									12	8	31
33	(United Kingdom) Duncan Tappy			3	11													30
34	(Netherlands) Frank Suntjens	18	Ret	Ret	18	21†	18	22	16	24	19	Ret	18	20	18	Ret	16	29
35	(Germany) Pascal Kochem							8	8									26
36	(Japan) Ryuji Yamamoto			4	Ret													17
37	(United Kingdom) Alexander Sims									Ret	5							16
38	(Switzerland) Fabien Thuner													11	15			16
39	(Norway) Pål Varhaug													13	13			16
40	(Switzerland) Ronnie Theiler													19	7			16
41	(Denmark) Johan Jokinen			Ret	25					17	21†	Ret	12					13
42	(Andorra) Francesc Moreno					17	22†	15	20									11
43	(United Kingdom) Dean Smith			DSQ	16													5
44	(Poland) Natalia Kowalska	Ret	19	Ret	24	20†	24	21	Ret									3
45	(Sweden) Felix Rosenqvist									21	Ret							0
46	(Poland) Andreij Gasenko	Ret	22															0
Pos	Driver name	ZAN (Netherlands)		OSC (Germany)		ASS (Netherlands)		ZOL (Belgium)		NÜR (Germany)		OSC (Germany)		SPA (Belgium)		HOC (Germany)		Points

† — Drivers did not finish the race, but were classified as they completed over 90% of the race distance.

=== Teams ===
Pos	Team	Points
1	Motopark Academy	842
2	Motorsport Arena	415
3	Koiranen Bros. Motorsport	398
4	AR Motorsport	341
5	SL Formula Racing	249
6	AKA Cobra	193
7	Team Formula Sport	189
8	MP Motorsport	170
9	Van Amersfoort Racing	148
10	KEO Racing	107
11	GR Racing	76
12	MB Motorsport	74
13	Trackstar Racing	72
14	Fortec Motorsport	97
15	Synsam Racing	56
16	Jenzer Motorsport	48
17	Borthwick Motorsport	31
18	Speed Lover	29
19	Omicron Racing	26
20	Manor Competition	16
