= Julian Theobald =

German racing driver

- Nationality: (Germany) German
- Born: 11 November 1984 (age 41) Giessen (Germany)
- Relatives: Johannes Theobald (brother)

FIA Formula Two Championship career
- Debut season: 2010
- Current team: MotorSport Vision
- Car number: 20
- Starts: 12
- Wins: 0
- Poles: 0
- Fastest laps: 0

Previous series
- 2007–08 2006 2005 2004 2002–03: Formula Renault 3.5 Series; Formula Three Euroseries; German Formula Three; FR2000 Germany; Formula König

Championship titles
- 2006: F3 Euroseries Trophy

Julian Theobald (born 11 November 1984 in Giessen) is a German former racing driver.

== Career ==
=== Formula König ===
After a long karting career, Theobald stepped up to single-seaters in 2002, racing in the Formula König series in his native Germany. After finishing 23rd in his first season in the category, he improved to eleventh place the following year, finishing one point ahead of his younger brother, Johannes.

=== Formula Renault 2.0 ===
2004 saw Theobald move up to the Formula Renault 2000 Germany series. In his eleven races in the championship, he scored 23 points to be classified in 28th position.

=== Formula Three ===
In 2005, Theobald graduated to Formula Three, racing in the German Formula Three Championship for the same SMS Seyffarth Junior Team as his brother Johannes. After starting the year with a Renault–powered Dallara F302, he switched to a Dallara F303–Mercedes after the fifth round at the Nürburgring. He finished the season just outside the championship's top-ten in eleventh place, with the highlight being a fastest lap at the penultimate round at the Lausitzring.

For 2006, Theobald continued in Formula Three, this time moving to the Formula Three Euroseries. He was entered into the new Trophy Class for cars used between 2002 and 2004. Despite only taking part in half of the seasons' twenty races due to budget constraints, Theobald secured the Trophy Class title after the seventh round of the year at Zandvoort, taking six class wins from ten races in the process.

=== Formula Renault 3.5 Series ===
After testing for Pons Racing at the end of 2006, Theobald made his Formula Renault 3.5 Series debut at Donington Park in September 2007, replacing Jaap van Lagen at Eurointernational. Competing in the final eight races of the season, he failed to score any points, taking a best race result of 18th at both Donington and the season finale in Barcelona. At the penultimate round of the season in Estoril, Theobald was joined in the team by his brother Johannes for a one-off appearance.

Theobald made a return to the series in 2008, signing for British team Fortec Motorsport a few days before the opening round of the season at Monza. He completed the first four races of the season for the team at Monza and Spa-Francorchamps before being replaced by Fairuz Fauzy from the Monaco round onwards.

=== Formula Two ===
After missing the entire 2009 racing season, Theobald and his brother both took part in the FIA Formula Two Championship pre-event test held at Brands Hatch in July 2010, with Theobald confirmed to take part in the Brands Hatch round of the 2010 season.

== Racing record ==
=== Career summary ===
Season	Series	Team	Races	Wins	Poles	F/Laps	Podiums	Points	Position
2002	Formula König	?	12	0	?	0	0	39	23rd
2003	Formula König	?	12	0	0	0	0	119	11th
2004	Formula Renault 2000 Germany	?	11	0	0	0	0	23	28th
2005	German Formula Three Championship	SMS Seyffarth Junior Team	18	0	0	1	0	11	11th
2006	Formula Three Euroseries - Trophy Class	SMS Seyffarth Motorsport	10	6	2	6	9	73	**1st**
2007	Formula Renault 3.5 Series	Eurointernational	8	0	0	0	0	0	36th
2008	Formula Renault 3.5 Series	Fortec Motorsport	4	0	0	0	0	0	33rd
2010	FIA Formula Two Championship	MotorSport Vision	6	0	0	0	0	0	NC
2011	FIA Formula Two Championship	MotorSport Vision	14	0	0	0	0	8	19th

=== Complete Formula Renault 3.5 Series results ===
(key) (Races in bold indicate pole position) (Races in italics indicate fastest lap)

Year	Team	1	2	3	4	5	6	7	8	9	10	11	12	13	14	15	16	17	Pos	Points
2007	Eurointernational	MNZ; 1	MNZ; 2	NÜR; 1	NÜR; 2	MON; 1	HUN; 1	HUN; 2	SPA; 1	SPA; 2	DON; 1; 23	DON; 2; 18	MAG; 1 Ret	MAG; 2; 23	EST; 1; 26	EST; 2 Ret	CAT; 1; 25	CAT; 2; 18	36th	0
2008	Fortec Motorsport	MNZ; 1; 15	MNZ; 2; 15	SPA; 1 Ret	SPA; 2; 21	MON; 1	SIL; 1	SIL; 2	HUN; 1	HUN; 2	NÜR; 1	NÜR; 2	LMS; 1	LMS; 2	EST; 1	EST; 2	CAT; 1	CAT; 2	33rd	0

=== Complete FIA Formula Two Championship results ===
(key) (Races in bold indicate pole position; Races in italics indicate fastest lap)

Year	1	2	3	4	5	6	7	8	9	10	11	12	13	14	15	16	17	18	Pos	Points
2010	SIL; 1	SIL; 2	MAR; 1	MAR; 2	MON; 1	MON; 2	ZOL; 1	ZOL; 2	ALG; 1	ALG; 2	BRH; 1; 17	BRH; 2; 17	BRN; 1; 13	BRN; 2; 15	OSC; 1; 14	OSC; 2 Ret	VAL; 1	VAL; 2	NC	0
2011	SIL; 1; 17	SIL; 2 Ret	MAG; 1; 17	MAG; 2 Ret	SPA; 1; 15	SPA; 2; 15	NÜR; 1; 16	NÜR; 2 Ret	BRH; 1	BRH; 2	RBR; 1; 6	RBR; 2; 12	MON; 1 Ret	MON; 2 Ret	CAT; 1	CAT; 2			19th	8

Sporting positions
Preceded by New title	Formula 3 Euro Series; Trophy Class; Champion; 2006	Succeeded by Discontinued
