= Frank Kechele =

German racing driver (born 1986)

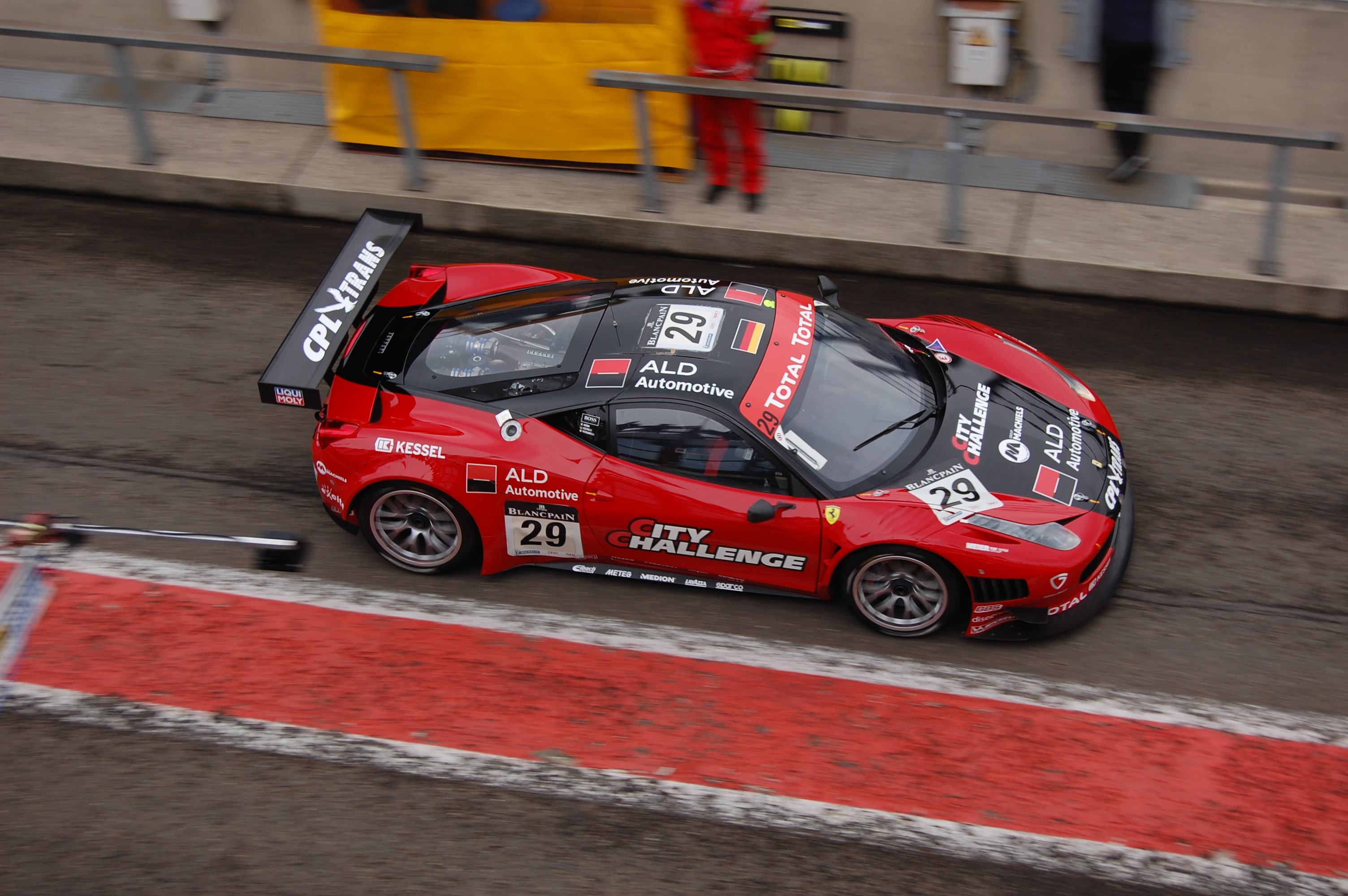
- Kechele in 2011
- Nationality: (Germany) German
- Born: 3 September 1986 (age 40) Nördlingen (Germany)
- Categorisation: FIA Gold (until 2018); FIA Silver (2019–)

Championship titles
- 2007: Formula Renault 2.0 NEC

Frank Kechele (born 3 September 1986 in Nördlingen, Bavaria) is a German racing driver. He won the 2007 Formula Renault 2.0 Northern European Cup for Motopark Academy, winning eight races and beating Tobias Hegewald and Valtteri Bottas to the title, and progressed to sports car racing soon after. As a Lamborghini factory driver, Kechele came third in the 2008 ADAC GT Masters and sixth in the 2010 FIA GT1 World Championship. He later won in the Blancpain Endurance Series for Ferrari and secured pole at the 2012 Spa 24 Hours in a Vita4One BMW Z4.

As of 2021, Kechele held the record for the most pole positions in ADAC GT Masters history.

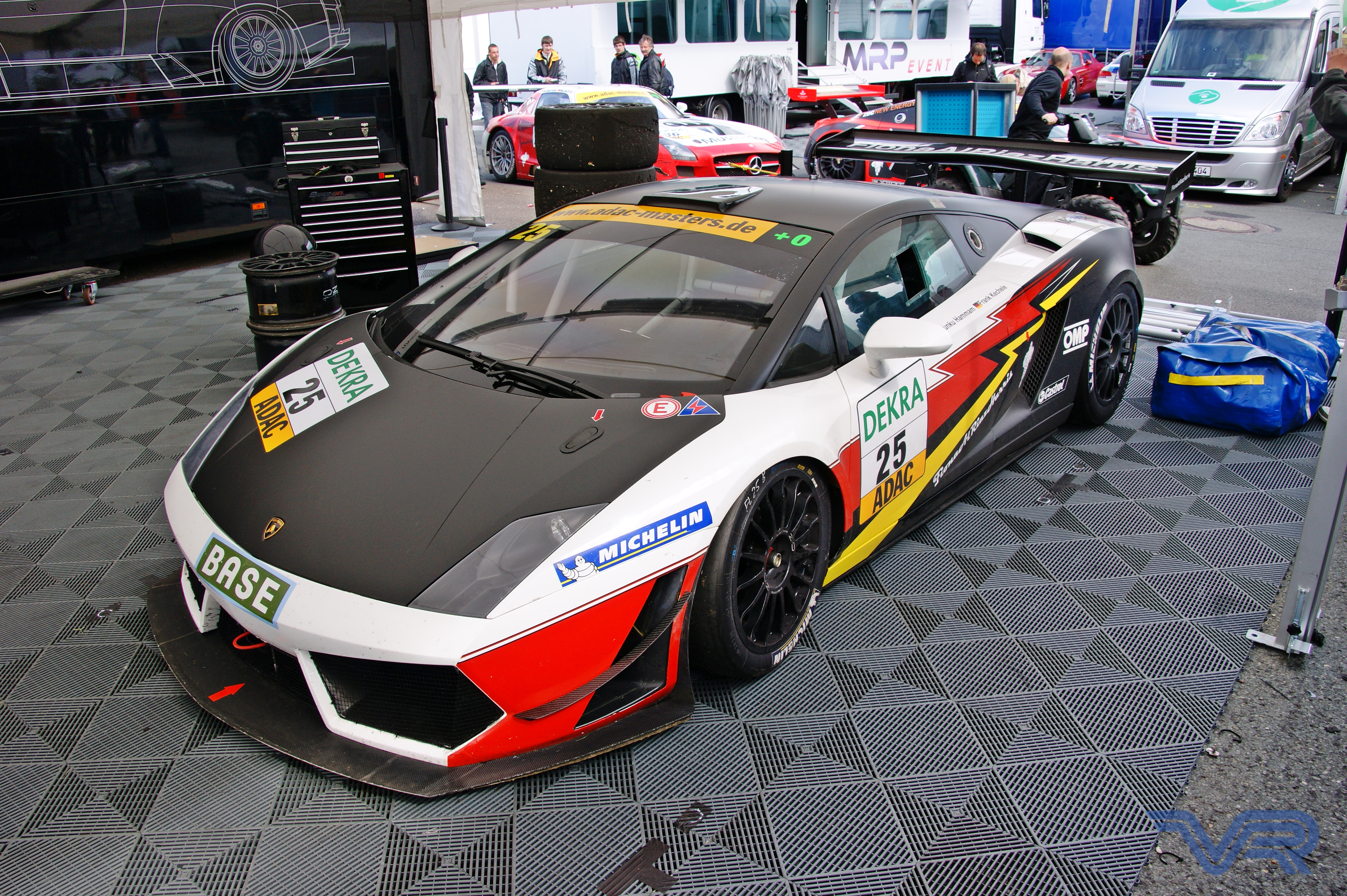
Kechele's Reiter Engineering Lamborghini at Sachsenring in 2011.

== Racing record ==
=== Complete Eurocup Formula Renault 2.0 results ===
(key) (Races in bold indicate pole position; races in italics indicate fastest lap)

Year	Entrant	1	2	3	4	5	6	7	8	9	10	11	12	13	14	DC	Points
2007	Motopark Academy	ZOL; 1; 8	ZOL; 2; 6	NÜR; 1; 4	NÜR; 2; 4	HUN; 1; 4	HUN; 2; 6	DON; 1; 6	DON; 2; 16	MAG; 1; 3	MAG; 2; 29	EST; 1; 7	EST; 2; 10	CAT; 1; 7	CAT; 2; 8	6th	67

=== Complete Formula Renault 2.0 NEC results ===
(key) (Races in bold indicate pole position) (Races in italics indicate fastest lap)

Year	Entrant	1	2	3	4	5	6	7	8	9	10	11	12	13	14	15	16	DC	Points
2007	Motopark Academy	**ZAN**; **1**; 1	ZAN; 2; 1	**OSC**; **1**; 1	OSC; 2; 2	ASS; 1; 5	**ASS**; **2**; 1	**ZOL**; **1**; 1	**ZOL**; **1**; 1	NUR; 1; 2	NUR; 2; 2	OSC; 1; 2	**OSC**; **2**; 1	SPA; 1; 2	**SPA**; **2**; 1	HOC; 1	HOC; 2	1st	376

=== Complete GT1 World Championship results ===
Year	Team	Car	1	2	3	4	5	6	7	8	9	10	11	12	13	14	15	16	17	18	19	20	Pos	Points
2010	Reiter	Lamborghini	ABU; QR	ABU; CR	SIL; QR; 6	SIL; CR; 3	BRN; QR; 20	BRN; CR; Ret	PRI; QR	PRI; CR	SPA; QR; 2	SPA; CR; 1	NÜR; QR; 4	NÜR; CR; 14	ALG; QR; 14	ALG; CR; 8	NAV; QR; 1	NAV; CR; 1	INT; QR; Ret	INT; CR; Ret	SAN; QR; 5	SAN; CR; 4	6th	95

Sporting positions
Preceded by Filipe Albuquerque	Formula Renault 2.0 NEC; Drivers' Champion; 2007	Succeeded by Valtteri Bottas
