= Parthiva Sureshwaren =

Indian race car driver (born 1980)

- Nationality: Indian
- Born: 21 February 1981 (age 45) Chennai, Tamil Nadu, India

FIA Formula Two Championship career
- Debut season: 2010
- Current team: MotorSport Vision
- Starts: 33
- Wins: 0
- Podiums: 0
- Poles: 0
- Fastest laps: 0
- Best finish: 21st in 2010, 2012

Parthiva Sureshwaren (born 21 February 1981) is an Indian former racing driver.

== Career ==
=== A1 Grand Prix ===
Sureshwaren drove in the 2006-07 A1 Grand Prix season for A1 Team India at the Australian round, replacing Narain Karthikeyan. He did so again for the 2007–08 season, replacing the injured Karthikeyan at Durban. He competed in Formula V6 Asia for the remainder of 2007 and got two podium finishes at the Sepang International circuit. He then targeted a move to the IndyCar Series in 2009.

=== Formula V6 Asia ===
In 2007, Sureshwaren raced for half the season in the Formula V6 Asian championship. He achieved two podiums in Sepang, Malaysia.

=== Formula Two ===
In 2010, Sureshwaren began competing in the FIA Formula Two Championship, taking part in the first six rounds and scoring points in Monza, Italy. In 2011, he elected to continue in the series. In 2012, Sureshwaren started his third season in the FIA Formula two championship and took part in four rounds at Silverstone, Algarve, Nurburgring and Spa Francorchamps.

== Racing record ==
=== Career summary ===
Season	Series	Pos.	Team	Car
2000	Formula 2000 Asia	**2nd**	N/A	Argo–Ford AF2000
2001	British Formula Three Championship – Scholarship class	11th	ME Motorsport	Dallara–Mugen-Honda F398
2002	Barber Dodge Pro Series	26th	Skip Barber Racing School	Reynard–Dodge 98E
2006–07	A1 Grand Prix	16th‡	A1 Team India	Lola–Zytek B05/52
2007	Formula Renault V6 Asia Championship	8th	Eurasia Motorsport	N/A
2007–08	A1 Grand Prix	10th‡	A1 Team India	Lola–Zytek B05/52
2010	FIA Formula Two Championship	21st	MotorSport Vision	Williams–Audi JPH1
2011	FIA Formula Two Championship	25th	MotorSport Vision	Williams–Audi JPH1
2012	FIA Formula Two Championship	21st	MotorSport Vision	Williams–Audi JPH1
2012–13	MRF Challenge Formula 2000 Championship	10th	N/A	Dallara–Renault Formulino Pro

‡ – Includes results scored by other drivers.

=== American Open-Wheel racing results ===
(key) (Races in bold indicate pole position, races in italics indicate fastest race lap)

==== Barber Dodge Pro Series ====
Year	1	2	3	4	5	6	7	8	9	10	Rank	Points
2002	SEB	LRP	LAG; 20	POR; 13	TOR; 14	CLE	VAN	MOH	ROA	MTL	**26th**	**5**

=== Complete A1 Grand Prix results ===
(key) (Races in bold indicate pole position) (Races in italics indicate fastest lap)

Year	Entrant	1	2	3	4	5	6	7	8	9	10	11	12	13	14	15	16	17	18	19	20	21	22	DC	Points
2006–07	India	NED; SPR	NED; FEA	CZE; SPR	CZE; FEA	CHN; SPR	CHN; FEA	MYS; SPR	MYS; FEA	IDN; SPR; PO	IDN; FEA; PO	NZL; SPR	NZL; FEA	AUS; SPR; 18	AUS; FEA; 16	RSA; SPR	RSA; FEA	MEX; SPR	MEX; FEA	CHN; SPR	CHN; FEA	GBR; SPR	GBR; SPR	**16th**	**13**
2007–08	India	NED; SPR	NED; FEA	CZE; SPR; PO	CZE; FEA; PO	MYS; SPR; PO	MYS; FEA; PO	CHN; SPR; PO	CHN; FEA; PO	NZL; SPR; PO	NZL; FEA; PO	AUS; SPR	AUS; FEA	RSA; SPR; 17	RSA; FEA; Ret	MEX; SPR; PO	MEX; FEA; PO	CHN; SPR; PO	CHN; FEA; PO	GBR; SPR; PO	GBR; SPR; PO			**10th**	**61**
2008–09	India	NED; SPR	NED; FEA	CHN; SPR	CHN; FEA	MYS; SPR	MYS; FEA	NZL; SPR; PO	NZL; FEA; PO	RSA; SPR; PO	RSA; FEA; PO	POR; SPR; PO	POR; FEA; PO	GBR; SPR; PO	GBR; SPR; PO									**12th**	**19**

=== Complete FIA Formula Two Championship results ===
(key) (Races in bold indicate pole position) (Races in italics indicate fastest lap)

Year	1	2	3	4	5	6	7	8	9	10	11	12	13	14	15	16	17	18	Pos	Points
2010	SIL; 1; 16	SIL; 2; 16	MAR; 1; 11	MAR; 2 Ret	MNZ; 1; 15	MNZ; 2; 10	ZOL; 1; 12	ZOL; 2 Ret	ALG; 1; 14	ALG; 2; 11	BRH; 1; 18	BRH; 2; 14	BRN; 1	BRN; 2	OSC; 1	OSC; 2	VAL; 1	VAL; 2	21st	1
2011	SIL; 1; 18	SIL; 2 Ret	MAG; 1	MAG; 2	SPA; 1; 21	SPA; 2; 19	NÜR; 1 DNS	NÜR; 2 Ret	BRH; 1; 11	BRH; 2; 14	RBR; 1 Ret	RBR; 2; 17	MNZ; 1; 15	MNZ; 2; 14	CAT; 1; 17	CAT; 2; 14			25th	0
2012	SIL; 1; 12	SIL; 2; 11	ALG; 1; 16	ALG; 2; 14	NÜR; 1; 12	NÜR; 2; 12	SPA; 1; 11	SPA; 2; 11	BRH; 1	BRH; 2	LEC; 1	LEC; 2	HUN; 1	HUN; 2	MNZ; 1	MNZ; 2			21st	0
