= Johan Jokinen =

Danish racing driver

- Nationality: (Denmark) Danish
- Born: Johan Daniel Valentiner Jokinen; 20 June 1990 (age 36) Copenhagen, Denmark
- Categorisation: FIA Silver

Previous series
- 2010 2009–11 2008-2009 2007–08 2007 2007 2007 2007: FIA Formula Two Championship; Peugeot Spider Cup Denmark; Eurocup Formula Renault 2.0; Formula Renault 2.0 NEC; Formula Ford Denmark; Formula Ford NEZ; Formula Ford Sweden; FFord Junior Cup Denmark

Championship titles
- 2010: Peugeot Spider Cup Denmark

Awards
- Talent of The Year, Tom Kristensen Award

Johan Daniel Valentiner Jokinen (born 20 June 1990 in Copenhagen) is a Danish former racing driver, who last raced in the 2012 Eurocup Formula Renault 2.0 season for Manor MP Motorsport.

== Career ==
=== Formula Ford ===
Jokinen began his formula racing career in local Formula Ford championships where he raced a ten-year-old Van Diemen. He won the Formula Ford Junior Cup Denmark and finished as runner-up in Formula Ford Denmark taking five victories which was more than anyone else that year. He was at the end of the season presented the Tom Kristensen Trophy as the best rookie and was also awarded Talent of The Year 2007 by the Dansk Automobil Sports Union, Denmark's motorsport organisation.

Jokinen's achievement of winning the Formula Ford Junior Cup granted him a free drive at the unofficial World Championships for Formula Ford at the Formula Ford Festival at Brands Hatch later the same year. After struggling in the qualification-races, which included a big shunt, he went through to the finals where he had to start 24th but as the race was interrupted by numerous accidents and safety car he could only manage 17th.

=== Formula Renault ===
In 2007, Jokinen participated in six races of the Formula Renault 2.0 Northern European Cup with KEO Racing. He finished in 41st place in the standings with thirteen points.

The following season, Jokinen competed in both the Formula Renault 2.0 Northern European Cup and Eurocup Formula Renault 2.0 championships with Motopark Academy & iQuick respectively. He finished fourth in the NEC standings, taking fifteen points-scoring positions in sixteen races, including a win in the eighth race of the season at Oschersleben. In the Eurocup, he took part in the final four races without scoring points. Even though he didn't manage to score any points he didn't finish off the season unnoticed as he during testing prior to the qualifying at both race-weekends were consistently within the top five drivers.

Jokinen decided to stay with iQuick for the winter testing and the 2009 season as they merged with the famous Formula Renault 3.5 team Draco Racing to become Draco Junior Team. Jokinen was appointed the team's first-driver and named as Draco Young Driver Project. But as the team underperformed and met economical misfortune Jokinen left the team already after the second round at Spa-Francorchamps.

=== Formula Three Euroseries ===
Jokinen made the full-time step-up to Formula Three when he was signed by Kolles & Heinz Union for a Formula Three Euroseries campaign, after Robert Wickens committed to the FIA Formula Two Championship and Jokinen had no other commitments following his departure of Draco. Jokinen finished 24th, without scoring points.

=== FIA Formula Two Championship ===
After a successful winter testing programme that saw him being at the top of the timing sheets more than once, Jokinen signed on for a full-time engagement in the series only a few weeks before the season kicked off. After having dealt with technical difficulties, misfortune and accidents on track, Jokinen was then sidelined with a complicated fracture on the left first toe after suffering an accident during training. During the six races he participated in prior to the accident he only finished two, taking home a third and seventh place at respectively race 2 at Silverstone and race 1 at Monza. At Monza, however, he was leading the race after having performed an overtaking manoeuvre on the leader driver during the first lap – which stands as the only direct overtaking for the lead after the first corner in the new era of Formula Two – before being handed a drive-through penalty following wrong instructions from the marshals when getting to his grid position.

== Personal life ==
Currently, Jokinen resides in Aarhus after having lived most of his life in Copenhagen. 2009 has so far been the only time where he permanently stayed at another country but Denmark, after having lived at Viareggio in Italy for eight months to train at the highly rated training centre for drivers, Formula Medicine. As a result of his year out of school. Jokinen has suffered a minor setback in his studies, but will be able to finish them by 2011.

Besides studying, Jokinen occupies himself with a number of activities including skiing, cycling and football, but also has interest for activities such as books, cooking and music.

== Racing record ==
=== Career summary ===
Season	Series	Team	Races	Wins	Poles	F/Laps	Podiums	Points	Position
2007	Formula Ford Denmark	Egebart Motorsport	12	5	1	5	8	250	**2nd**
2007	Formula Ford Junior Cup Denmark	Egebart Motorsport	?	?	?	?	?	111	**1st**
2007	Formula Ford NEZ		4	0	0	0	2	42	7th
2007	Formula Ford Festival – Duratec		1	0	0	0	0	N/A	17th
2007	Formula Ford Zetec Sweden		?	?	?	?	?	18	15th
2007	Formula Renault 2.0 NEC	KEO Racing	6	0	0	0	0	13	41st
2008	Eurocup Formula Renault 2.0	iQuick	4	0	0	0	0	0	39th
2008	Formula Renault 2.0 NEC	Motopark Academy	16	1	1	2	4	225	5th
2009	Formula 3 Euro Series	Kolles & Heinz Union	17	0	0	0	0	0	24th
2009	Eurocup Formula Renault 2.0	iQuick Valencia	4	0	0	0	0	8	20th
2009	Peugeot Spider Cup Denmark		2	0	0	0	0	28	9th
2010	Peugeot Spider Cup Denmark		11	6	2	4	10	171	**1st**
2010	FIA Formula Two Championship	MotorSport Vision	6	0	0	1	1	21	17th
2011	European F3 Open	Cedars	4	2	0	2	2	36	10th
2011	Formula Renault 2.0 NEC	KEO Racing	3	0	0	0	0	34	28th
2011	Eurocup Formula Renault 2.0	KEO Racing	2	0	0	0	0	0	NC
2011	Peugeot Spider Cup Denmark	Team Go Go Vitesse	2	1	0	1	2	?	NC
2012	Eurocup Formula Renault 2.0	Manor MP Motorsport	4	0	0	0	0	0	35th

=== Complete Formula Renault 2.0 NEC results ===
(key) (Races in bold indicate pole position) (Races in italics indicate fastest lap)

Year	Entrant	1	2	3	4	5	6	7	8	9	10	11	12	13	14	15	16	17	18	19	20	DC	Points
2007	KEO Racing	ZAN; 1	ZAN; 2	OSC; 1 Ret	OSC; 2; 25	ASS; 1	ASS; 2	ZOL; 1	ZOL; 1	NUR; 1; 17	NUR; 2; 21†	OSC; 1 Ret	OSC; 2; 12	SPA; 1	SPA; 2	HOC; 1	HOC; 2					41st	13
2008	Motopark Academy	HOC; 1; 6	HOC; 2; 3	ZAN; 1; 4	ZAN; 2; 4	ALA; 1; 20	ALA; 2; 4	OSC; 1; 3	**OSC**; **2**; 1	ASS; 1 Ret	ASS; 2; 18	ZOL; 1; 6	ZOL; 2; 5	NÜR; 1; 5	NÜR; 2; 3	SPA; 1; 15	SPA; 2; 9					5th	224
2011	KEO Racing	HOC; 1	HOC; 2	HOC; 3	SPA; 1	SPA; 2	NÜR; 1	NÜR; 2	ASS; 1	ASS; 2	ASS; 3	OSC; 1	OSC; 2	ZAN; 1	ZAN; 2	MST; 1	MST; 2	MST; 3	MNZ; 1; 8	MNZ; 2; 8	MNZ; 3; 13	28th	34

=== Complete Eurocup Formula Renault 2.0 results ===
(key) (Races in bold indicate pole position; races in italics indicate fastest lap)

Year	Entrant	1	2	3	4	5	6	7	8	9	10	11	12	13	14	DC	Points
2008	iQuick	SPA; 1	SPA; 2	SIL; 1	SIL; 2	HUN; 1	HUN; 2	NÜR; 1	NÜR; 2	LMS; 1	LMS; 2	EST; 1; 17	EST; 2; 16	CAT; 1; 20	CAT; 2 Ret	39th	0
2009	iQuick Valencia	CAT; 1; 4	CAT; 2 Ret	SPA; 1; 14	SPA; 2; 14	HUN; 1	HUN; 2	SIL; 1	SIL; 2	LMS; 1	LMS; 2	NÜR; 1	NÜR; 2	ALC; 1	ALC; 2	20th	8
2011	KEO Racing	ALC; 1	ALC; 2	SPA; 1	SPA; 2	NÜR; 1	NÜR; 2	HUN; 1	HUN; 2	SIL; 1	SIL; 2	LEC; 1	LEC; 2	CAT; 1 Ret	CAT; 2 Ret	NC†	0
2012	Manor MP Motorsport	ALC; 1 Ret	ALC; 2; 17	SPA; 1; 13	SPA; 2 Ret	NÜR; 1	NÜR; 2	MSC; 1	MSC; 2	HUN; 1	HUN; 2	LEC; 1	LEC; 2	CAT; 1	CAT; 2	35th	0

† As Jokinen was a guest driver, he was ineligible for points

=== Complete Formula 3 Euro Series results ===
(key)

Year	Entrant	Chassis	Engine	1	2	3	4	5	6	7	8	9	10	11	12	13	14	15	16	17	18	19	20	DC	Points
2009	Kolles & Heinz Union	Dallara F309/001	Volkswagen	HOC1; 1	HOC1; 2	LAU; 1 DNS	LAU; 2; 18	NOR; 1 Ret	NOR; 2; 14	ZAN; 1; 19	ZAN; 2 Ret	OSC; 1; 20	OSC; 2 Ret	NÜR; 1; 20	NÜR; 2; 16	BRH; 1; 19	BRH; 2; 18	CAT; 1; 13	CAT; 2 Ret	DIJ; 1; 17	DIJ; 2; 9	HOC2; 1; 18	HOC2; 2; 11	24th	0

=== Complete FIA Formula Two Championship results ===
(key) (Races in bold indicate pole position) (Races in italics indicate fastest lap)

Year	1	2	3	4	5	6	7	8	9	10	11	12	13	14	15	16	17	18	DC	Points
2010	SIL; 1 Ret	SIL; 2; 3	MAR; 1 Ret	MAR; 2 Ret	MNZ; 1; 7	MNZ; 2 Ret	ZOL; 1	ZOL; 2	ALG; 1	ALG; 2	BRH; 1	BRH; 2	BRN; 1	BRN; 2	OSC; 1	OSC; 2	VAL; 1	VAL; 2	17th	21
