= Natalia Kowalska =

Polish racing driver

- Nationality: (Poland) Polish
- Born: 31 December 1989 (age 36) Koszalin (Poland)

FIA Formula Two Championship career
- Debut season: 2010
- Current team: MotorSport Vision
- Car number: 77
- Starts: 20
- Wins: 0
- Poles: 0
- Fastest laps: 0
- Best finish: 19th in 2010

Previous series
- 2007 2008: Formula Renault 2.0 NEC; Star Mazda Championship

Natalia Kowalska (born 31 December 1989 in Koszalin) is a Polish former racing driver.

== Career ==
Kowalska started her career in Kart racing in Poland. In 2007, she moved to formula racing, driving a partial program in the Formula Renault 2.0 Northern European Cup. In 2008, she drove six races in the Star Mazda North American Championship. After a break in 2009, in 2010, she took part in the FIA Formula Two Championship. She continued in the championship in 2011.

== Racing record ==
=== Career summary ===
Season	Series	Team	Races	Wins	Poles	F/Laps	Podiums	Points	Position
2007	Formula Renault 2.0 NEC	SL Formula Racing	6	0	0	0	0	3	44th
2007	Eurocup Formula Renault 2.0	SL Formula Racing	2	0	0	0	0	0	NC
2008	Star Mazda	John Walko Racing	6	0	0	0	0	0	NC
2010	FIA Formula Two Championship	MotorSport Vision	16	0	0	0	0	3	19th
2011	FIA Formula Two Championship	MotorSport Vision	4	0	0	0	0	0	27th

=== Complete Formula Renault 2.0 NEC results ===
(key) (Races in bold indicate pole position) (Races in italics indicate fastest lap)

Year	Entrant	1	2	3	4	5	6	7	8	9	10	11	12	13	14	15	16	DC	Points
2007	SL Formula Racing	ZAN; 1 Ret	ZAN; 2; 19	OSC; 1 Ret	OSC; 2; 24	ASS; 1; 20†	ASS; 2; 24	ZOL; 1; 21	ZOL; 1 Ret	NUR; 1	NUR; 2	OSC; 1	OSC; 2	SPA; 1	SPA; 2	HOC; 1	HOC; 2	44th	3

=== Complete Eurocup Formula Renault 2.0 results ===
(key) (Races in bold indicate pole position; races in italics indicate fastest lap)

Year	Entrant	1	2	3	4	5	6	7	8	9	10	11	12	13	14	DC	Points
2007	SL Formula Racing	ZOL; 1	ZOL; 2	NÜR; 1; 25	NÜR; 2 Ret	HUN; 1	HUN; 2	DON; 1	DON; 2	MAG; 1	MAG; 2	EST; 1	EST; 2	CAT; 1	CAT; 2	46th	0

=== Complete FIA Formula Two Championship results ===
(key) (Races in bold indicate pole position) (Races in italics indicate fastest lap)

Year	1	2	3	4	5	6	7	8	9	10	11	12	13	14	15	16	17	18	Pos	Points
2010	SIL; 1; 14	SIL; 2; 12	MAR; 1 Ret	MAR; 2; 11	MON; 1 Ret	MON; 2; 14	ZOL; 1 Ret	ZOL; 2; 11	ALG; 1; 10	ALG; 2; 9	BRH; 1; 15	BRH; 2; 13	BRN; 1 Ret	BRN; 2; 14	OSC; 1	OSC; 2	VAL; 1 Ret	VAL; 2; 16	19th	3
2011	SIL; 1 Ret	SIL; 2; 12	MAG; 1 Ret	MAG; 2; 20	SPA; 1	SPA; 2	NÜR; 1	NÜR; 2	BRH; 1	BRH; 2	SPL; 1	SPL; 2	MON; 1	MON; 2	CAT; 1	CAT; 2			27th	0
