= Paul Rees =

British racing driver

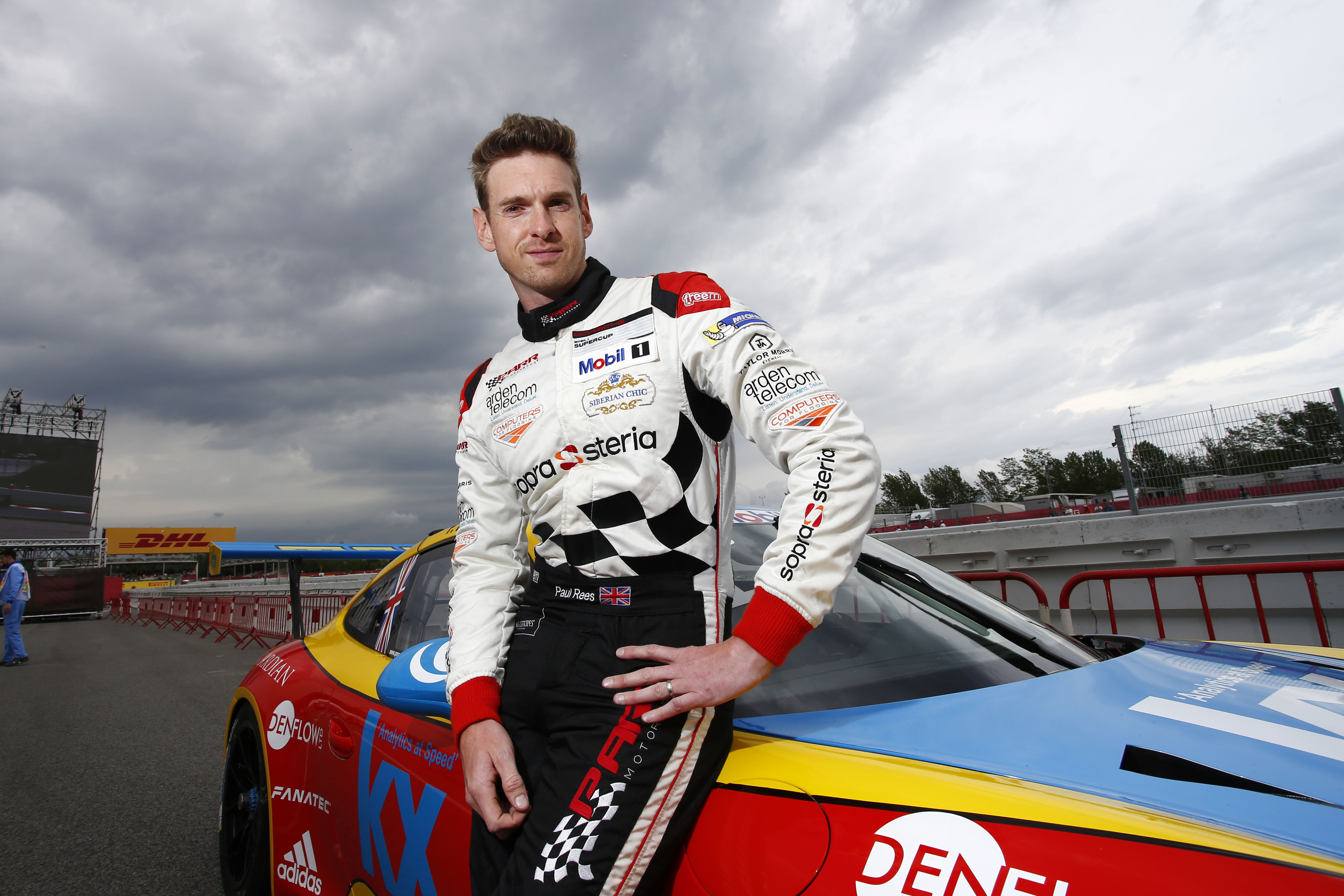
- Rees in 2016 at a round of the Porsche Mobil 1 Supercup.
- Nationality: (United Kingdom) British
- Born: 20 April 1985 (age 41) Oxford

FIA Formula Two Championship career
- Debut season: 2010
- Current team: MotorSport Vision
- Car number: 27
- Starts: 8
- Wins: 0
- Poles: 3
- Fastest laps: 5
- Best finish: 4th in 2010

Previous series
- 2008–2009 2007 2005–2006: Formula Palmer Audi; Formula Renault 2.0 UK; Formula BMW UK

Championship titles
- 2014: 3rd Porsche CARRERA cup GB 2014

Paul Rees (born 20 April 1985) is a British racing driver, stunt driver and TV presenter. Rees competed in the Porsche Mobil 1 Supercup and in the FIA Formula Two Championship. His father was the former Formula 1 driver Alan Rees. He was The Stig in the BBC motoring show Top Gear from 2019 to 2022.

== Racing record ==
=== Career summary ===
Season	Series	Team	Races	Wins	Poles	F/Laps	Podiums	Points	Position
2003	Formula Renault UK Winter Series	Falcon	2	0	0	0	0	0	NC
2005	Formula BMW USA	Walker Racing	2	0	0	0	0	1	2nd
2005	Formula BMW UK	Team SWR Pioneer	14	0	0	0	0	2	3rd
2006	Formula BMW UK	Coles Racing	4	0	0	0	0	4	18th
2007	Formula Renault UK Winter Series	Fortec Motorsport	4	0	0	0	0	37	11th
2007	French Formula Renault 2.0	Fortec Motorsport	2	0	0	0	0	0	NC
2007	Formula Renault UK	Mark Burdett Motorsport	12	0	0	0	0	29	4th
2008	Formula Palmer Audi	emedia	20	1	5	3	0	177	7th
2009	Formula Palmer Audi	Oxford Audi	20	1	2	2	5	217	4th
2010	FIA Formula Two Championship	MotorSport Vision	8	0	1	2	0	18	8th
2011	International GT Open - GTS	Mtech Limited	2	0	0	0	0	7	24th
2011	FIA GT3 European Championship	Mtech Limited	1	0	0	0	0	0	NC
2014	Porsche Carrera Cup GB	In2Racing	19	2	2	5	3	250	**3rd**
2014	Porsche Supercup	MOMO-Megatron	2	0		0	1	0	29th
2015	Porsche Carrera Cup GB	Parr Motorsport	14	0	1	2	0	110	8th
2015	Porsche Supercup	MOMO Megatron Team PARTRAX	1	0	0	0	1	0	NC†
2016	Porsche Supercup	MOMO Megatron Team PARTRAX	10	0	1	2	0	28	11th
2017	Porsche Supercup	MOMO Megatron Team PARTRAX	11	0	0	3	2	24	8th
2018	GT4 European Series - Silver	Team GT	12	0	1	3	2	42	7th

^{†} As Rees was a guest driver, he was ineligible to score points.

=== Complete FIA Formula Two Championship results ===
(key) (Races in bold indicate pole position) (Races in italics indicate fastest lap)

Year	1	2	3	4	5	6	7	8	9	10	11	12	13	14	15	16	17	18	DC	Pts
2010	SIL; 1; 13	SIL; 2; 13	MAR; 1; 7	MAR; 2; 8	MNZ; 1; 9	MNZ; 2; 7	ZOL; 1; 13	ZOL; 2; 13	ALG; 1	ALG; 2	BRH; 1	BRH; 2	BRN; 1	BRN; 2	OSC; 1	OSC; 2	VAL; 1	VAL; 2	9th	18

=== Complete Porsche Supercup results ===
(key) (Races in bold indicate pole position) (Races in italics indicate fastest lap)

Year	Team	1	2	3	4	5	6	7	8	9	10	11	Pos.	Pts
2014	MOMO-Megatron	CAT	MON	RBR	SIL	HOC	HUN	SPA	MNZ	COA; 17	COA; 22		29th	0
2015	MOMO Megatron Team PARTRAX	CAT	MON	RBR	SIL	HUN	SPA	SPA	MNZ	MNZ	COA; C	COA; 12	NC‡	0‡
2016	MOMO Megatron Team PARTRAX	CAT; 10	MON; 10	RBR; 18	SIL; 22	HUN; Ret	HOC; 16	SPA; 26†	MNZ; Ret	COA; 7	COA; Ret		9th	28
2017	MOMO Megatron Team PARTRAX	CAT; 13	CAT; 11	MON; Ret	RBR; 15	SIL; 17	HUN; 14	SPA; 24	SPA; 13	MNZ; Ret	MEX; 11	MEX; 13	17th	24

^{‡} Rees was a guest driver, therefore he was ineligible for points. ^{†} Driver did not finish the race, but was classified as he completed over 75% of the race distance.
