= Kelvin Snoeks =

Dutch racing driver (born 1987)

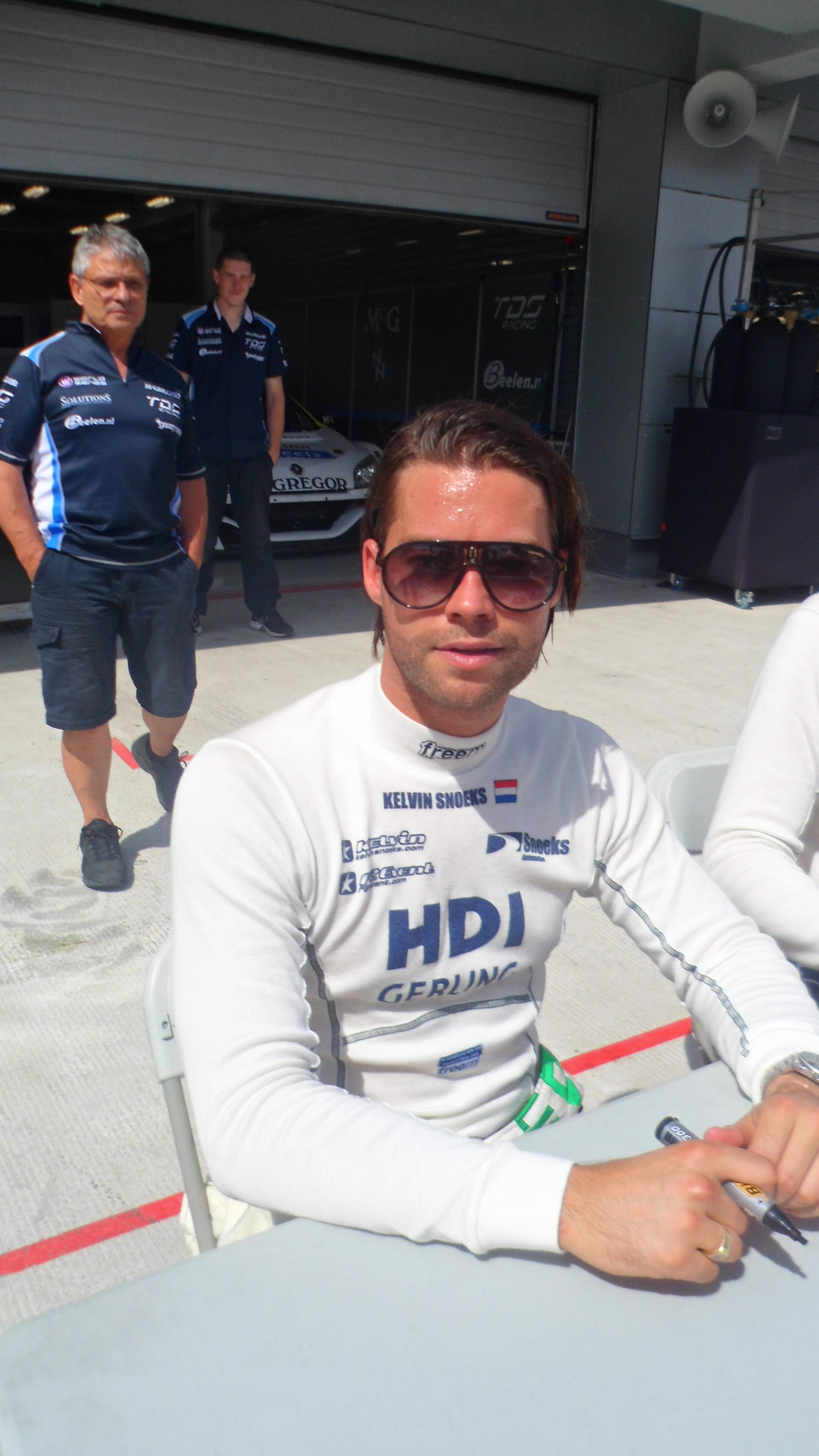
- Snoeks in 2012.
- Nationality: (Netherlands) Dutch
- Born: Kelvin Manuel Mathijs Snoeks; 12 September 1987 (age 39) Haarlem, Netherlands

Eurocup Mégane Trophy career
- Debut season: 2012
- Current team: TDS Racing
- Categorisation: FIA Silver
- Car number: 12
- Starts: 8
- Wins: 0
- Poles: 0
- Fastest laps: 0

Previous series
- 2010-11 2009 2007–08: FIA Formula Two Championship; International Formula Master; Formula Renault 2.0 NEC

Championship titles
- 2015: Supercar Challenge - Super GT

Kelvin Manuel Mathijs Snoeks (born 12 September 1987 in Haarlem) is a former Dutch racing driver. In 2010, he competed in the FIA Formula Two Championship. Snoeks stayed in Formula Two for the 2011 season. In 2020, he raced in the DTM Trophy, which is a support series for the DTM.

== Racing record ==
=== Career summary ===
Season	Series	Team	Races	Wins	Poles	F/Laps	Podiums	Points	Position
2007	Formula Renault 2.0 NEC	AR Motorsport	16	0	0	0	0	52	26th
2008	Formula Renault 2.0 NEC	AR Motorsport	16	0	0	0	0	140	9th
2009	International Formula Master	AR Motorsport	16	0	0	0	0	0	20th
2009	Formula Renault 2.0 Sweden	AR Motorsport	2	0	0	0	0	5	15th
2010	Formula Renault 2.0 NEC	KEO Racing	2	0	0	0	1	20	30th
2010	FIA Formula Two Championship	MotorSport Vision	16	0	0	0	1	48	13th
2011	Benelux Radical Cup	Radical Sportscars	3	0	0	0	3	32	6th
2011	FIA Formula Two Championship	MotorSport Vision	6	0	0	0	0	40	10th
2012	Eurocup Mégane Trophy	TDS Racing	13	0	0	0	1	82	6th
2012	Dutch GT Championship	HDI-Gerling - Ekris Motorsport	12	1	0	0	2	53	12th
2013	Eurocup Mégane Trophy	Oregon Team	14	0	0	1	6	129	4th
2013	Dutch GT Championship	HDI-Gerling - Formido Racing	9	0	0	0	1	75	**3rd**
2013	Avon Tyres GT4 Trophy	HDI-Gerling	7	1	1	0	2	64	5th
2014	International GT Open - Super GT	V8 Racing	2	0	0	0	1	12	10th
2014	Supercar Challenge - Super GT	Day-V-Tec	16	5	2	2	10	211	4th
2014	MW-V6 Pickup Series	The Netherlands	3	0	0	0	1	31	15th
2015	Supercar Challenge - Super GT	Team RaceArt	10	1	5	8	9	277	**1st**
2015	Lamborghini Super Trofeo Europe - Pro-Am	Leipert Motorsport	12	0	1	1	7	106	**2nd**
2015	Lamborghini Super Trofeo World Final - Pro-Am	Leipert Motorsport	2	0	0	1	1	14	**3rd**
2016	ADAC GT Masters	HB Racing WDS Bau	14	0	0	0	0	2	48th
2017	Lamborghini Super Trofeo Europe - Pro-Am	ArtLine Team Georgia	12	2	1	4	6	109	**3rd**
2017	Lamborghini Super Trofeo World Final - Pro-Am	ArtLine Team Georgia	2	0	0	0	0	?	?
2018	Lamborghini Super Trofeo Europe - Pro	Bonaldi Motorsport	12	1	1	1	4	65	5th
2018	Lamborghini Super Trofeo World Final - Pro	Bonaldi Motorsport	1	0	0	0	1	12	5th
2019	ADAC GT Masters	Team Zakspeed BKK Mobil Oil Racing	12	0	0	0	1	22	23rd
2019	Mazda MX-5 Cup Netherlands	Blueberry Racing	?	?	?	?	?	15	21st
2020	DTM Trophy	Racing One	6	0	0	0	0	12	16th
2021	VRM BMW M2 Cup	MV Motorsport	10	0	0	?	2	109.5	6th
2022	BMW M2 Cup Benelux	MV Motorsport	4	0	0	0	0	11	15th
2025	Radical Cup Benelux	Radical Nederlands	2	0	0	1	0	?	?

=== Complete Formula Renault 2.0 NEC results ===
(key) (Races in bold indicate pole position) (Races in italics indicate fastest lap)

Year	Entrant	1	2	3	4	5	6	7	8	9	10	11	12	13	14	15	16	17	18	19	20	DC	Points
2007	AR Motorsport	ZAN 1; 17	ZAN 2 Ret	OSC 1 Ret	OSC 2; 22	ASS 1; 14	ASS 2 DSQ	ZOL 1 Ret	ZOL 1; 14	NUR 1 Ret	NUR 2; 18	OSC 1; 15	OSC 2; 15	SPA 1; 16	SPA 2; 14	HOC 1; 18	HOC 2; 18					26th	52
2008	AR Motorsport	HOC 1; 10	HOC 2; 10	ZAN 1; 7	ZAN 2; 8	ALA 1; 11	ALA 2 Ret	OSC 1; 7	OSC 2; 10	ASS 1; 7	ASS 2; 12	ZOL 1; 17	ZOL 2; 13	NÜR 1; 16	NÜR 2; 16	SPA 1; 13	SPA 2; 14					9th	140
2010	KEO Racing	HOC 1	HOC 2	BRN 1	BRN 2	ZAN 1 Ret	ZAN 2; 3	OSC 1	OSC 2	OSC 3	ASS 1	ASS 2	MST 1	MST 2	MST 3	SPA 1	SPA 2	SPA 3	NÜR 1	NÜR 2	NÜR 3	30th	20

=== Complete FIA Formula Two Championship results ===
(key) (Races in bold indicate pole position) (Races in italics indicate fastest lap)

Year	1	2	3	4	5	6	7	8	9	10	11	12	13	14	15	16	17	18	Pos	Points
2010	SIL 1; 12	SIL 2 Ret	MAR 1; 3	MAR 2; 9	MNZ 1; 13	MNZ 2 DSQ	ZOL 1; 11	ZOL 2; 10	ALG 1 Ret	ALG 2 Ret	BRH 1	BRH 2	BRN 1; 7	BRN 2; 8	OSC 1; 8	OSC 2; 4	VAL 1; 12	VAL 2; 8	13th	48
2011	SIL 1 Ret	SIL 2; 8	MAG 1; 10	MAG 2 Ret	SPA 1; 10	SPA 2; 9	NÜR 1; 6	NÜR 2; 19	BRH 1 Ret	BRH 2 Ret	RBR 1 Ret	RBR 2; 5	MNZ 1; 11	MNZ 2; 8	CAT 1; 9	CAT 2; 6			10th	40
