= Ivan Samarin (racing driver) =

Russian racing driver

- Nationality: Russian
- Born: Ivan Alekseyevich Samarin; 7 September 1988 (age 38) Moscow (Soviet Union)

German Formula Three career
- Debut season: 2011
- Current team: ArtLine Racing
- Car number: 50
- Starts: 2
- Wins: 0
- Poles: 0
- Fastest laps: 0

Previous series
- 2010 2008 2008 2008 2006–08 2004–05: FIA Formula Two; Russian Formula Three; Finnish Formula Three; Formula Three NEZ; Formula 1600 Russia; Formula RUS

Championship titles
- 2006–07: Formula 1600 Russia

Ivan Alekseyevich Samarin (Russian: Ива́н Алексе́евич Сама́рин, IPA: [ɪˈvan ɐlʲɪˈksʲejɪvʲɪtɕ sɐˈmarʲɪn], born 7 September 1988 in Moscow) is a Russian racing driver, holder of the honour of "Master of sports of Russia".

== Career ==
=== Early career ===
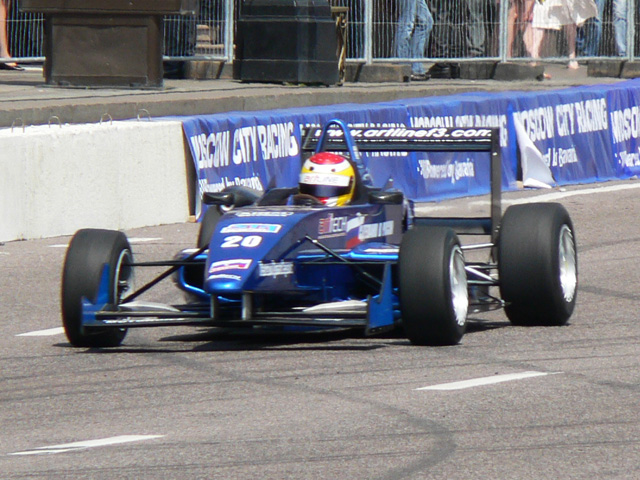
Samarin driving Fotmula 3 ArtTech F24 car at Moscow City Racing 2008 show

Samarin competed in karting from 1998 to 2003. He began his formula racing career in the 2004 Formula RUS season, finishing fourth overall in the championship standings. For 2005, he remained in the series and finished as runner-up.

Samarin's next step was Formula 1600 Russia. He took four race victories in 2006, en route to the championship. He continued in the series in 2007, taking the title once again.

Samarin competed in a number of regional championship events for the Russian Formula Three, Finnish Formula Three, and Formula Three NEZ in 2008.

Samarin missed the entire 2009 season due to sponsorship problems.

=== FIA Formula Two Championship ===
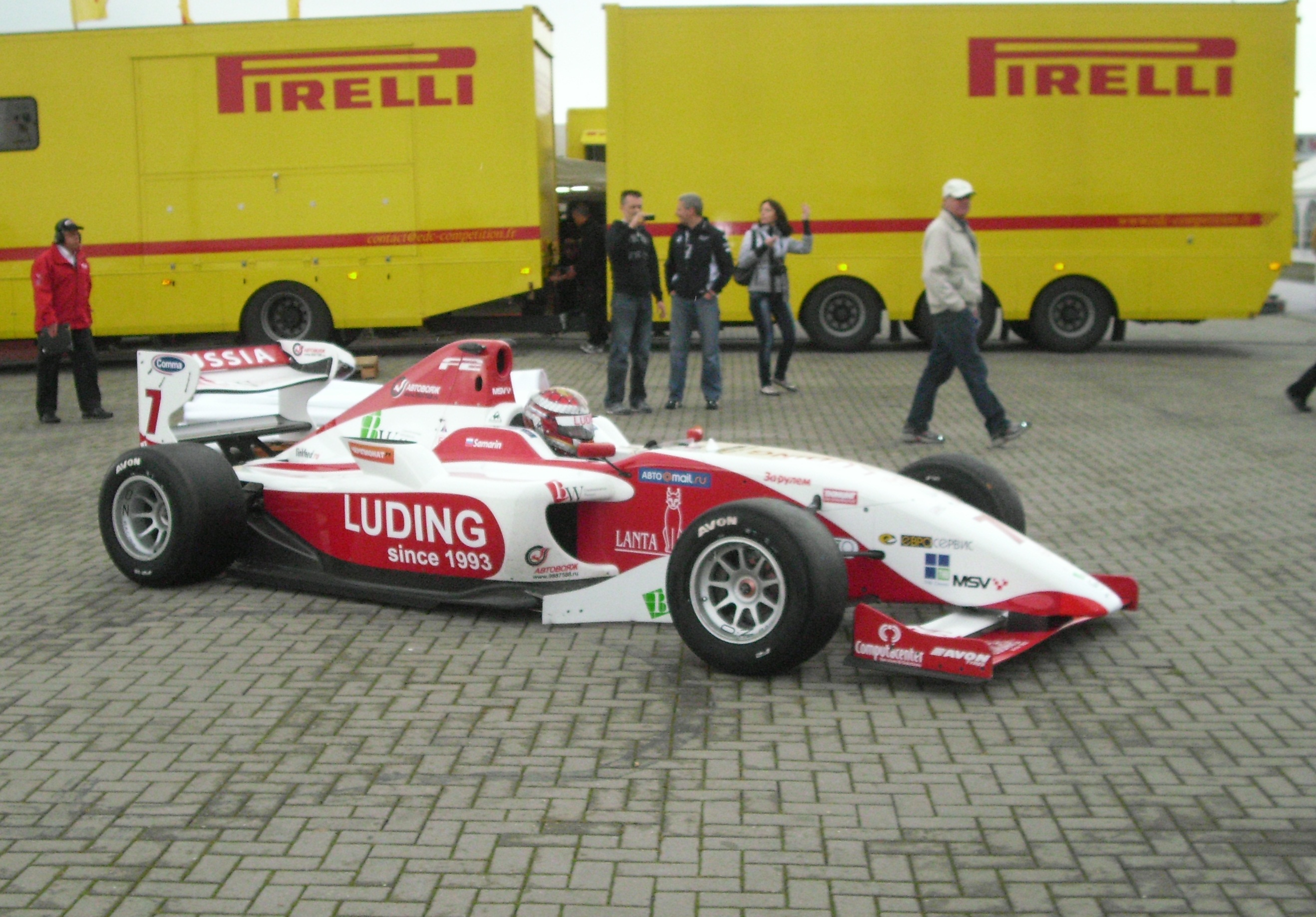
Samarin at the Oschersleben round of the 2010 FIA Formula Two Championship season.

Samarin stepped up to the FIA Formula Two Championship in 2010.

== Racing record ==
=== Career results ===
Season	Series	Team	Races	Wins	Poles	F/Laps	Podiums	Points	Position
2004	Formula RUS	Lukoil Racing Team Junior	4	0	0	0	2	53	4th
2005	Formula RUS	Lukoil Racing Team Junior	4	1	0	2	3	53	**2nd**
2006	Formula 1600 Russia	Istok Art-Line Racing	10	?	?	?	?	79	**1st**
2007	Formula 1600 Russia	Istok Art-Line Racing	14	5	0	3	8	186	**1st**
2008	Russian Formula Three	Art-Line Engineering	12	4	2	?	8	129	**2nd**
2008	Russian Formula Three	AKM Racing Team	12	4	2	?	8	129	**2nd**
2008	Finnish Formula Three	Art-Line Engineering	2	0	0	0	0	32	12th
2008	Formula Three NEZ	Art-Line Engineering	2	0	0	0	0	14	7th
2010	FIA Formula Two Championship	Motorsport Vision	8	0	0	0	1	64	12th

=== Complete FIA Formula Two Championship results ===
(key) (Races in bold indicate pole position) (Races in italics indicate fastest lap)

Year	1	2	3	4	5	6	7	8	9	10	11	12	13	14	15	16	17	18	DC	Points
2010	SIL; 1 DSQ	SIL; 2; 15	MAR; 1; 4	MAR; 2 Ret	MON; 1; 12	MON; 2; 8	ZOL; 1; 7	ZOL; 2; 8	ALG; 1; 13	ALG; 2; 8	BRH; 1; 3	BRH; 2; 9	BRN; 1; 14	BRN; 2; 16	OSC; 1 Ret	OSC; 2; 8	VAL; 1; 10	VAL; 2; 4	12th	64
