= AR Motorsport =

Dutch auto racing team

(Netherlands) AR Motorsport
- Founded: 1992
- Team principal(s): Ronald Heiligers
- Former series: Eurocup Formula Renault 2.0; Formula Renault 2.0 Netherlands; British Formula Renault Championship; International Formula Master; Formula Renault 2.0 Sweden
- Teams' Championships: 2003 Formula Renault 2000 Netherlands; 2004 Formula Renault 2000 Netherlands
- Drivers' Championships: 2003 Formula Renault 2000 Netherlands (Meijer); 2006 Formula Renault UK Winter Series (Strous)

AR Motorsport is an auto racing team based in the Netherlands founded in 1992. The team appeared in Formula Renault 2000 Eurocup in 2002, 2004, 2005, and 2006, Formula Renault 2000 Masters 2003, and International Formula Masters 2009.
