= Benjamin Bailly =

Belgian racing driver

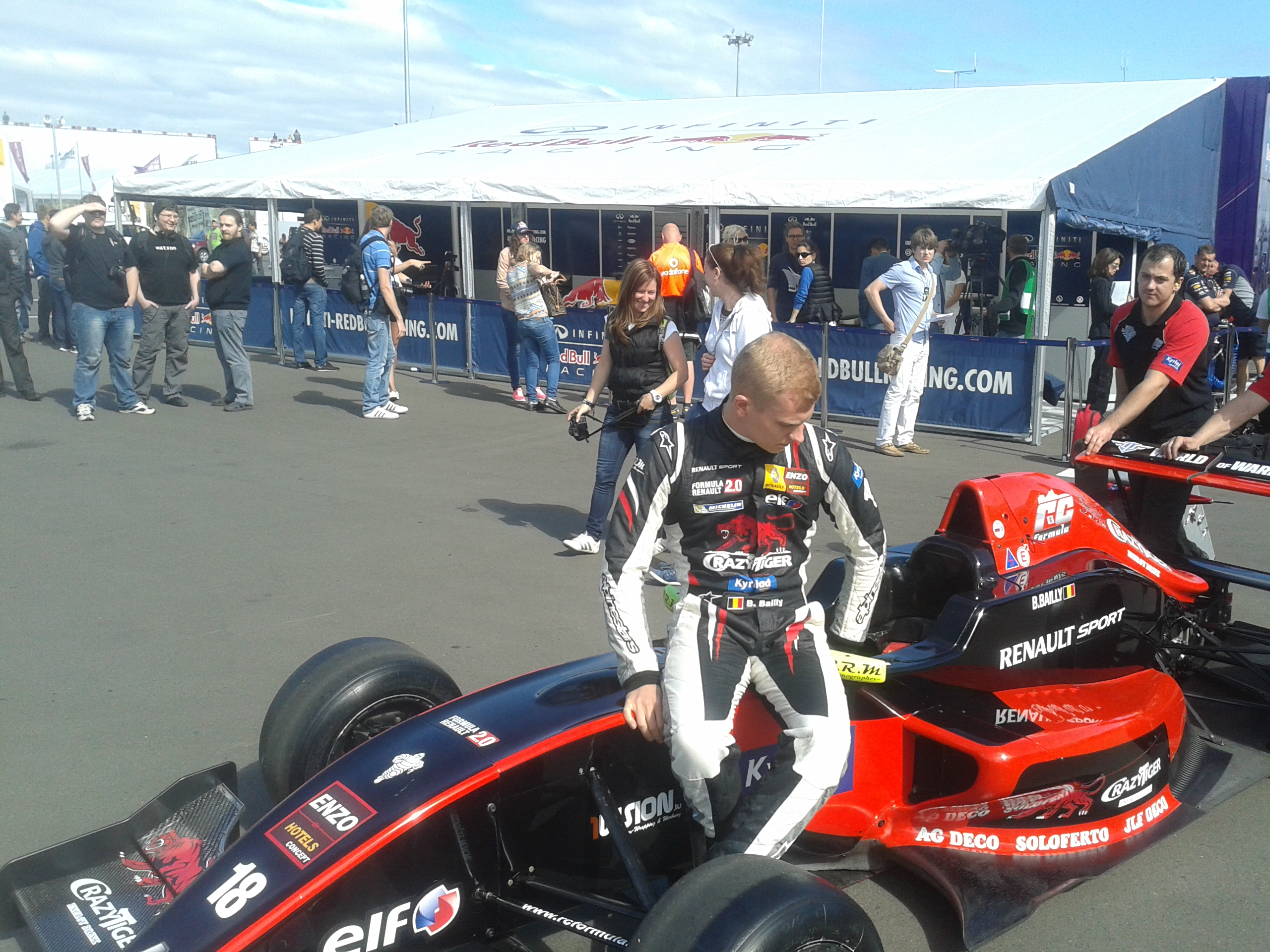
- Bailly in 2013.
- Nationality: (Belgium) Belgian
- Born: 22 May 1990 (age 36) Liège (Belgium)

Eurocup Formula Renault 2.0 career
- Debut season: 2013
- Current team: RC Formula
- Car number: 18
- Starts: 16
- Wins: 0
- Poles: 0
- Fastest laps: 0
- Best finish: 28th in 2013

Previous series
- 2010 2009 2008: FIA Formula Two Championship; Formul'Academy Euro Series; Formula Renault 2.0 WEC

Championship titles
- 2009: Formul'Academy Euro Series

Benjamin Bailly (born 22 May 1990 in Liège) is a Belgian former racing driver.

== Career ==
=== Karting ===
Bailly began his karting career in 2004, and three years later finished third in the French Elite Championship. Also in 2007, he achieved the highlight of his karting career, finishing fifth in the premier Formula A World Championship.

=== Formula Renault ===
In 2008, Bailly moved up to single-seater racing, joining the Formula Renault 2.0 WEC series for the first two races at Nogaro.

In 2009, Bailly joined the Formul'Academy Euro Series which he won comfortably at the first attempt, taking eleven podium places from thirteen races in the process.

=== FIA Formula Two Championship ===
2010 saw Bailly move to the FIA Formula Two Championship. He finished the season in seventh position after winning the second of his two home races at Zolder.

== Racing record ==
=== Career summary ===
Season	Series	Team	Races	Wins	Poles	F/Laps	Podiums	Points	Position
2008	Formula Renault 2.0 WEC	Boutsen Energy Racing	2	0	0	0	0	0	NC
2009	Formul'Academy Euro Series	Auto Sport Academy	14	6	4	4	11	162	**1st**
2010	FIA Formula Two Championship	Motorsport Vision	18	1	1	0	3	130	7th
2011	Blancpain Endurance Series – Gentleman	VDS Racing Adventures	1	?	?	?	?	8	21st
2012	Radical European Masters	Slim Racing	4	0	0	0	0	3	24th
2012	Formula Renault 2.0 Alps Series	RC Formula	2	0	0	0	0	0	31st
2012	Blancpain Endurance Series – Gentleman	VDS Racing Adventures	?	?	?	?	?	?	?
2013	Eurocup Formula Renault 2.0	RC Formula	16	0	0	0	0	0	28th
2015	ADAC Formula 4 Championship	RS Competition	3	0	0	0	0	2	28th
2015	Remus Formel 4 – Formel 1800 Pokal	RS Competition	2	1	?	0	2	21.5	**2nd**
2017	F4 Danish Championship	Vesti Mototsport	3	0	0	2	2	43	10th

=== Complete Formula Renault 2.0 Alps Series results ===
(key) (Races in bold indicate pole position; races in italics indicate fastest lap)

Year	Team	1	2	3	4	5	6	7	8	9	10	11	12	13	14	15	Pos	Points
2008	Boutsen Energy Racing	NOG; 1; 25	NOG; 2; 20	DIJ; 1	DIJ; 2	VAL; 1	VAL; 2	LEM	EST; 1	EST; 2	SPA; 1	SPA; 2	MAG; 1	MAG; 2	CAT; 1	CAT; 2	38th	0

=== Complete Formul'Academy Euro Series results ===
(key) (Races in bold indicate pole position; races in italics indicate fastest lap)

Year	1	2	3	4	5	6	7	8	9	10	11	12	13	14	Pos	Points
2009	VAL; 1; 3	**VAL**; **2**; 1	PAU; 1; 2	PAU; 2; 4	**OSC**; **1**; 1	OSC; 2; 2	SPA; 1 Ret	SPA; 2; 1	MAG; 1; 2	MAG; 2; 3	**MNZ**; **1**; 1	**MNZ**; **2**; 1	ALC; 1; 1	ALC; 2; 5	1st	162

=== Complete FIA Formula Two Championship results ===
(key) (Races in bold indicate pole position) (Races in italics indicate fastest lap)

Year	1	2	3	4	5	6	7	8	9	10	11	12	13	14	15	16	17	18	DC	Points
2010	SIL; 1; 11	SIL; 2; 11	MAR; 1 Ret	MAR; 2 Ret	MON; 1; 6	MON; 2; 6	ZOL; 1; 6	**ZOL**; **2**; 1	ALG; 1; 2	ALG; 2; 3	BRH; 1; 13	BRH; 2; 11	BRN; 1; 4	BRN; 2; 5	OSC; 1; 5	OSC; 2; 5	VAL; 1; 8	VAL; 2; 9	7th	130

=== Complete Formula Renault 2.0 Alps Series results ===
(key) (Races in bold indicate pole position; races in italics indicate fastest lap)

Year	Team	1	2	3	4	5	6	7	8	9	10	11	12	13	14	Pos	Points
2012	RC Formula	MNZ; 1	MNZ; 2	PAU; 1	PAU; 2	IMO; 1	IMO; 2	SPA; 1; 17	SPA; 2; 13	RBR; 1	RBR; 2	MUG; 1	MUG; 2	CAT; 1	CAT; 2	31st	0

=== Complete Eurocup Formula Renault 2.0 results ===
(key) (Races in bold indicate pole position; races in italics indicate fastest lap)

Year	Team	1	2	3	4	5	6	7	8	9	10	11	12	13	14	Pos	Points
2013	RC Formula	ALC; 1; 29	ALC; 2; 28	SPA; 1 Ret	SPA; 2; 24	MSC; 1; 15	MSC; 2; 21	RBR; 1; 25	RBR; 2; 22	HUN; 1; 22	HUN; 2; 20	LEC; 1; 13	LEC; 2 Ret	CAT; 1; 17	CAT; 2 Ret	28th	0

=== Complete ADAC Formula 4 Championship results ===
(key) (Races in bold indicate pole position; races in italics indicate fastest lap)

Year	Team	1	2	3	4	5	6	7	8	9	10	11	12	13	14	15	16	17	18	19	20	21	22	23	24	DC	Points
2015	RS Competition	OSC; 1	OSC; 2	OSC; 3	RBR; 1	RBR; 2	RBR; 3	SPA; 1	SPA; 2	SPA; 3	LAU; 1	LAU; 2	LAU; 3	NÜR; 1	NÜR; 2	NÜR; 3	SAC; 1	SAC; 2	SAC; 3	OSC; 1; 17	OSC; 2; 9	OSC; 3; 14	HOC; 1	HOC; 2	HOC; 3	28th	2

=== Complete F4 Danish Championship results ===
(key) (Races in bold indicate pole position; races in italics indicate fastest lap)

Year	Team	1	2	3	4	5	6	7	8	9	10	11	12	13	14	15	16	17	18	19	20	21	DC	Points
2017	Vesti Motorsport	JYL1; 1	JYL1; 2	JYL1; 3	DJU1; 1	DJU1; 2	DJU1; 3	PAD1; 1	PAD1; 2	PAD1; 3	JYL2; 1	JYL2; 2	JYL2; 3	PAD2; 1	PAD2; 2	PAD2; 3	DJU2; 1; 8	DJU2; 2; 3	DJU2; 3; 2	JYL3; 1	JYL3; 2	JYL3; 3	10th	43

Sporting positions
Preceded by Arthur Pic	Formul'Academy Euro Series; Champion; 2009	Succeeded by Stoffel Vandoorne
