= Magny-Cours =

- Commune
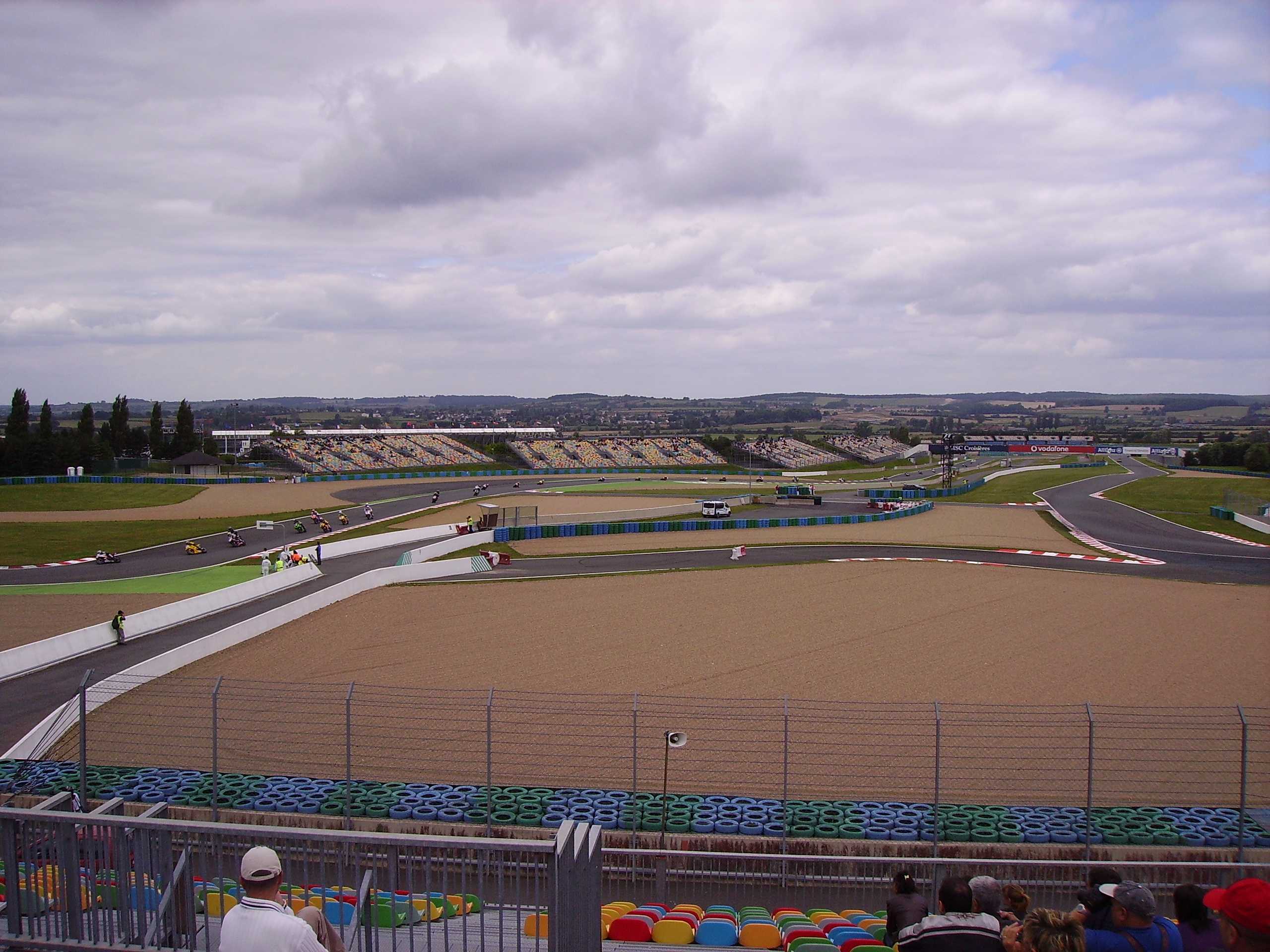
- The Circuit de Nevers Magny-Cours
- Location of Magny-Cours
- Location within France Location within Bourgogne-Franche-Comté
- Coordinates: 46°53′07″N 3°09′02″E
- Country: France
- Region: Bourgogne-Franche-Comté
- Department: Nièvre
- Arrondissement: Nevers
- Canton: Nevers-2
- Intercommunality: Loire et Allier

Government
  - Mayor (2020–2026): Jean-Louis Gutierrez
- Area^{1}: 31.87 km^{2} (12.31 sq mi)
- Elevation: 200 m (660 ft)
- Highest elevation: 277 m (909 ft)
- Lowest elevation: 181 m (594 ft)
- Population (2023): 1,432
  - Density: 44.93/km^{2} (116.4/sq mi)
- Time zone: UTC+01:00 (CET)
  - Summer (DST): UTC+02:00 (CEST)
- INSEE/Postal code: 58152 /58470
- ^{1} French Land Register data, which excludes lakes, ponds, glaciers > 1 km^{2} (0.386 sq mi or 247 acres) and river estuaries.

Magny-Cours (French pronunciation: [maɲi kuʁ]) is a commune in the Nièvre department in central France.

It is the home of the Circuit de Nevers Magny-Cours, a famous motor racing circuit (whose name is often abbreviated to 'Magny-Cours'). It formerly hosted the Formula One French Grand Prix.

Magny-Cours also hosts the Conservatoire de la monoplace française.

== See also ==
- Communes of the Nièvre department
