= FIA Formula Two Championship (2009–2012) =

Single-Seater Racing Championship

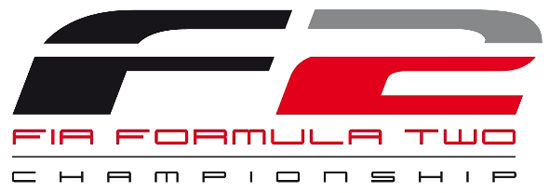
- Category: Single seater
- Region: Europe
- Inaugural season: 2009
- Folded: 2012
- Drivers: 30
- Constructors: Williams Grand Prix Engineering, operated by MotorSport Vision
- Engine suppliers: Audi 1.8-litre 20v Turbo
- Tyre suppliers: Yokohama
- Last Drivers' champion: (United Kingdom) Luciano Bacheta
- Official website: fiaformula2.com

The FIA Formula Two Championship was a one-make class of auto racing for Formula Two open wheeled single seater racing cars. The championship was contested each year from 2009 to 2012. It was a revival of the former European Formula Two Championship that was previously run from 1967 to 1984. Organised by MotorSport Vision, drivers competed over 16 rounds at eight venues, in identical cars built by Williams Grand Prix Engineering, with 480 bhp engines developed by Mountune Racing and supplied by Audi.

Formula Two was revived due to the Fédération Internationale de l'Automobile's concern that the cost of competing in motor racing at a level to progress directly to Formula One was becoming unreachable for many participants, and the category was re-introduced as a lower-cost alternative for drivers. The FIA tender to supply and operate the Championship was awarded to the British MotorSportVision Racing company, owned by former Formula One racer Jonathan Palmer.

Compared to rival series such as GP2 and Formula Renault 3.5, Formula Two cost significantly less per season whilst allowing drivers to prove their skill and develop their racecraft, in identical vehicles designed by a six-man team from Williams Grand Prix Engineering, led by Director of Engineering Patrick Head. The F2 vehicles were assembled and prepared between races at MotorSport Vision's Bedford Autodrome facility, prior to each championship event.

In December 2012, MotorSport Vision announced that the series would not be run in 2013.

== Chassis ==
Named after both Jonathan Palmer and Patrick Head, the Williams JPH1 chassis and survival cell is of carbon fibre composite monocoque construction. The car was designed to comply with 2005 FIA F1 Safety Regulations. Head protection conforms to the latest 2009 F1 standards. Amongst many other detailed safety features, roadwheel tethers are incorporated.

== Race weekend ==
For each race meeting there was 90 minutes of free practice, one hour of official qualifying, with the race distance being approximately 175 kilometres (109 mi). This increased to 2 x 40 minute races in 2011.

All drivers had their cars prepared and entered centrally by MSV. Drivers worked with a single mechanic throughout the season, and a rotating group of engineers. This means that a driver's finances had no effect on performance and no one could gain an unfair advantage as every car was operated by the same team.

== Scoring system ==
For the 2009 season, the scoring system was 10–8–6–5–4–3–2–1 for the top eight race positions. In 2010, Formula Two adopted the same scoring system change as in Formula One, with points awarded to the top ten finishers. Points were awarded the same for both races in the weekend, as follows:

Position	1st	2nd	3rd	4th	5th	6th	7th	8th	9th	10th
Points	25	18	15	12	10	8	6	4	2	1

== Champions ==
Season	Driver	Poles	Wins	Podiums	Points	FL	Clinched	Margin	Ref
2009	(Spain) Andy Soucek	2	7	11	115	3	Race 13 of 16	51	
2010	(United Kingdom) Dean Stoneman	6	6	11	284	6	Race 17 of 18	42	
2011	(Italy) Mirko Bortolotti	7	7	14	298	7	Race 14 of 16	109	
2012	(United Kingdom) Luciano Bacheta	3	5	10	231.5	5	Race 16 of 16	21.5	

== Television ==
The races were broadcast by the sports broadcaster Motors TV. Every race was screened live at fixed times, with several repeat showings.

F2 also had a one-hour highlights program distributed worldwide, and featured prominently in the global Motorsports Mundial program.

Live streaming of the races was available with free access on the official F2 website.
