= 2010 Zolder Formula Two round =

Fourth round of the 2010 FIA Formula Two Championship season

(Belgium) 2010 Zolder Formula Two round
Round details
- Round 4 of 9 in the 2010 FIA Formula Two Championship.
- Location: Zolder, Belgium
- Course: Permanent race circuit 4.011 km (2.492 mi)

First race
- Date: June 19 2010
- Laps: 25
Pole position
- Driver: (United Kingdom) Dean Stoneman
- Time: 1:23.200
Podium
- First: (United Kingdom) Dean Stoneman
- Second: (United Kingdom) Jolyon Palmer
- Third: (Lithuania) Kazim Vasiliauskas
Fastest lap
- Driver: (United Kingdom) Dean Stoneman
- Time: 1:24.324 (on lap 25)

Second race
- Date: June 20 2010
- Laps: 22
Pole position
- Driver: (Belgium) Benjamin Bailly
- Time: 1:22.353
Podium
- First: (Belgium) Benjamin Bailly
- Second: (United Kingdom) Jolyon Palmer
- Third: (United Kingdom) Dean Stoneman
Fastest lap
- Driver: (Russia) Sergey Afanasyev
- Time: 1:24.038 (on lap 20)

The 2010 Zolder Formula Two round was the fourth round of the 2010 FIA Formula Two Championship season. It was held on June 19, 2010 and June 20, 2010 in Zolder, Belgium.

== Classification ==
=== Qualifying 1 ===
Pos	No	Name	Time	Grid
1	48	(United Kingdom) Dean Stoneman	1:23.200	1
2	21	(Lithuania) Kazim Vasiliauskas	1:23.443	2
3	4	(Belgium) Benjamin Bailly	1:23.538	3
4	6	(India) Armaan Ebrahim	1:23.718	4
5	3	(United Kingdom) Jolyon Palmer	1:23.829	5
6	19	(Italy) Nicola de Marco	1:23.914	6
7	7	(Russia) Ivan Samarin	1:24.048	7
8	33	(Austria) Philipp Eng	1:24.135	8
9	2	(United Kingdom) Will Bratt	1:24.196	9
10	11	(United Kingdom) Jack Clarke	1:24.207	10
11	14	(Russia) Sergey Afanasyev	1:24.225	11
12	9	(Romania) Mihai Marinescu	1:24.407	12
13	12	(Netherlands) Kelvin Snoeks	1:24.562	13
14	27	(United Kingdom) Paul Rees	1:24.573	14
15	77	(Poland) Natalia Kowalska	1:24.730	15
16	10	(France) Benjamin Lariche	1:24.884	16
17	5	(Angola) Ricardo Teixeira	1:25.026	17
18	26	(India) Parthiva Sureshwaren	1:25.062	18
19	8	(Bulgaria) Plamen Kralev	1:25.990	19
