= 2010 Brands Hatch Formula Two round =

(United Kingdom) 2010 Brands Hatch Formula Two round
Round details
- Round 6 of 9 in the 2010 FIA Formula Two Championship.
- Location: Kent, England
- Course: Permanent race circuit 4.206 km (2.613 mi)

First race
- Date: July 17 2010
- Laps: 28
Pole position
- Driver: (Lithuania) Kazim Vasiliauskas
- Time: 1:16.061
Podium
- First: (United Kingdom) Dean Stoneman
- Second: (United Kingdom) Jack Clarke
- Third: (Russia) Ivan Samarin
Fastest lap
- Driver: (United Kingdom) Dean Stoneman
- Time: 1:17.582 (on lap 6)

Second race
- Date: July 18 2010
- Laps: 24
Pole position
- Driver: (Lithuania) Kazim Vasiliauskas
- Time: 1:16.061
Podium
- First: (Austria) Philipp Eng
- Second: (United Kingdom) Tom Gladdis
- Third: (United Kingdom) Will Bratt
Fastest lap
- Driver: (United Kingdom) Dean Stoneman
- Time: 1:39.223 (on lap 3)

The 2010 Brands Hatch Formula Two round was the sixth round of the 2010 FIA Formula Two Championship season. It will be held on July 17, 2010 and July 18, 2010 at Brands Hatch, Kent, England. This was the first race at Brands Hatch after the death of Henry Surtees the previous year.

== Classification ==
=== Qualifying ===
| Pos | Driver | Time |
|---|---|---|
| 1 | (Lithuania) Kazim Vasiliauskas | 1:16.061 |
| 2 | (Austria) Philipp Eng | 1:16.317 |
| 3 | (United Kingdom) Tom Gladdis | 1:16.164 |
| 4 | (Russia) Sergey Afanasyev | 1:16.237 |
| 5 | (United Kingdom) Jolyon Palmer | 1:16.317 |
| 6 | (United Kingdom) Will Bratt | 1:16.351 |
| 7 | (United Kingdom) Dean Stoneman | 1:16.385 |
| 8 | (Italy) Nicola De Marco | 1:16.487 |
| 9 | (India) Armaan Ebrahim | 1:16.562 |
| 10 | (Romania) Mihai Marinescu | 1:16.608 |
| 11 | (Russia) Ivan Samarin | 1:16.763 |
| 12 | (France) Benjamin Lariche | 1:16.814 |
| 13 | (Belgium) Benjamin Bailly | 1:16.888 |
| 14 | (United Kingdom) Jack Clarke | 1:16.989 |
| 15 | (Poland) Natalia Kowalska | 1:17.282 |
| 16 | (India) Parthiva Sureshwaren | 1:17.569 |
| 17 | (Angola) Ricardo Teixeira | 1:17.734 |
| 18 | (Germany) Julian Theobald | 1:17.771 |
| 19 | (Bulgaria) Plamen Kralev | 1:18.473 |
