= 2006 German Formula Three Championship =

Seasons
- ← 2005 2007 →

The 2006 ATS Formel 3 Cup season was a multi-event motor racing championship for single-seat open wheel formula racing cars that held across Europe. The championship featured drivers competing in two-litre Formula Three racing cars built by Dallara, Ligier, Lola and SLC which conform to the technical regulations, or formula, for the championship. It was the fourth edition of the ATS F3 Cup. It commenced on 22 April at Oschersleben and ended on 1 October at the same place after ten double-header rounds.

The title was won by Ho-Pin Tung, who became the first Chinese driver to win the Formula Three championship. He achieved nine wins, to overcome his teammate Ferdinand Kool by 46 points, who was victorious at Lausitz. The third place went to Harald Schlegelmilch, who clinched both the Trophy and Rookie titles and won three from four races at Assen. Seyffarth Motorsport driver Renger van der Zande lost two points to Schlegelmilch in both the main and Rookie championship to finish fourth and second respectively. Nico Hülkenberg won the race at Hockenheim and completed the top five. Schlegelmilch's teammate Joey Foster was the last driver to win more than one race. He did it at Oschersleben, Hockenheim and Nürburgring. Other wins were shared between Nathan Antunes and Johnny Cecotto Jr.

== Teams and drivers ==
2006 Entry List
Team	No.	Driver	Chassis	Engine	Status	Rounds
Cup Class
(Austria) HS Technik Motorsport	2	(Germany) Martin Hippe	Lola B06/30/HU04	Opel		1
(Austria) HS Technik Motorsport	2	(Australia) Nathan Antunes	Lola B06/30/HU04	Opel	R	7–10
(Austria) HS Technik Motorsport	3	(United Kingdom) Joey Foster	Lola B06/30/HU03	Opel	R	1–6
(Belgium) JB Motorsport	5	(Netherlands) Ferdinand Kool	Lola B06/30/HU01	Opel		All
(Belgium) JB Motorsport	6	(China) Ho-Pin Tung	Lola B06/30/HU02	Opel		All
(Germany) Seyffarth Motorsport	8	(Netherlands) Renger van der Zande	Dallara F306/025	Mercedes	R	All
(Germany) Seyffarth Motorsport	9	(Switzerland) Cyndie Allemann	Dallara F306/06	Mercedes	R	All
(Switzerland) Swiss Racing Team	10	(Germany) Dominik Schraml	Dallara F305/004	Opel		1–2
(Switzerland) Swiss Racing Team	11	(Japan) Hiroyuki Matsumura	Dallara F305/039	Opel	R	1–3
(Switzerland) Swiss Racing Team	12	(Sweden) Max Nilsson	Dallara F305/004	Opel	R	4–6, 8–10
(Switzerland) Swiss Racing Team	13	(Brazil) Marcello Thomaz	SLC R1/F3002	Opel		1–5, 8, 10
(Netherlands) Van Amersfoort Racing	16	(South Korea) Récardo Bruins Choi	Dallara F305/046	Opel	R	1–6, 8–10
(Netherlands) Van Amersfoort Racing	17	(Netherlands) Dominick Muermans	Dallara F306/023	Opel	R	1–6, 8–10
(Germany) Leipert Motorsport	18	(Germany) Norman Knop	Dallara F305/040	Opel	R	All
(Germany) Schuler Motorsport	19	(Austria) Hannes Neuhauser	Dallara F305/034	Toyota		5
(Germany) Rennsport Rössler	20	(Germany) Benjamin Leuchter	Dallara F305/024	Opel	R	10
(Italy) Ombra Racing	22	(Italy) Mattia Pavoni	Dallara F306/007	Mugen-Honda	R	All
(Italy) Ombra Racing	23	(Italy) Marika Diana	Dallara F305/064	Mugen-Honda	R	1–4
(Italy) Ombra Racing	23	(Venezuela) Johnny Cecotto Jr.	Dallara F305/064	Mugen-Honda	R	5–6
(Italy) Ombra Racing	24	(Italy) Massimo Rossi	Dallara F305/064	Mugen-Honda	R	8–10
(Germany) Josef Kaufmann Racing	25	(Germany) Nico Hülkenberg	Ligier JS47	Opel	R	1–9
(Italy) Target Racing	27	(Italy) Riccardo Azzoli	SLC R1/F3003	Opel		1–7, 9–10
(Italy) Target Racing	28	(Italy) Salvatore Gatto	SLC R1/F3002	Opel	R	1–7
(Italy) Target Racing	28	(Venezuela) Johnny Cecotto Jr.	SLC R1/F3002	Opel	R	8–9
(Switzerland) Bordoli Motorsport	29	(Switzerland) Natacha Gachnang	Dallara F305/026	Opel	R	1–6, 8–10
(Sweden) Performance Racing	30	(Macau) Rodolfo Ávila	Dallara F305/051	Mugen-Honda		3
Trophy Class
(Germany) JMS Motorsport	31	(Germany) Christer Jöns	Dallara F302/084	Opel		1–6, 8
(Austria) Neuhauser Racing	33	(Austria) Marco Oberhauser	Dallara F303/022	Opel		9
(Austria) Franz Wöss Racing	35	(Austria) Martin Konrad	Dallara F302/087	Opel		1–7, 9–10
(Austria) Franz Wöss Racing	36	(Austria) Denis G. Watt	Dallara F302/074	Opel		1–4, 9
(Austria) Franz Wöss Racing	37	(Germany) Christopher Kuntz	Dallara F301/016	Opel		2
(Austria) Franz Wöss Racing	37	(Finland) Marko Nevalainen	Dallara F303/007	Opel		7
(Germany) Rennsport Rössler	38	(Germany) Helmut Ebert	Dallara F303/008	Opel		1–5
(Germany) FS Motorsport	39	(Italy) Marika Diana	Dallara F302/050	Opel	R	5–6
(Switzerland) Jo Zeller Racing	40	(Switzerland) Urs Rüttimann	Dallara F301/006	Opel	R	4, 7, 9
(Germany) Seyffarth Motorsport	41	(Germany) Johannes Theobald	Dallara F303/015	Mercedes		1–6, 8–10
(Germany) Prinz Schwadtke	42	(Germany) Ronny Wechselberger	Dallara F302/040	Opel	R	All
(Germany) Leipert Motorsport	45	(Italy) Luca Iannaccone	Dallara F302/060	Renault		All
(Austria) HS Technik Motorsport	46	(Latvia) Harald Schlegelmilch	Dallara F303/026	Opel		All
(Czech Republic) KFR Team F3	47	(Slovakia) Leonardo Valois	Dallara F302/044	Opel	R	6–8, 10
(Czech Republic) KFR Team F3	48	(Czech Republic) Petr Samek	Dallara F302/044	Opel		1–5, 9
(Germany) WM Sporting Formula Racing	51	(Germany) André Pablo Sander	Dallara F302/021	Renault	R	1–2
(Germany) Schuler Motorsport	53	(Germany) Marcel Schuler	Dallara F303/006	Toyota	R	All
(Germany) Schuler Motorsport	54	(Switzerland) Rolf Biland	Dallara F303/012	Opel	R	All
(Switzerland) Swiss Racing Team	56	(Japan) Hiroyuki Matsumura	Dallara F302/061	Opel	R	4
(Switzerland) Swiss Racing Team	57	(Germany) Michael Klein	Dallara F302/061	Opel		8–10
(Germany) Bernd Deuling	58	(Germany) Bernd Deuling	Dallara F302/009	Opel		8
(Sweden) Performance Racing	60	(Finland) Juho Annala	Dallara F302/004	Mugen-Honda		3

Icon	Status
R	Rookie

== Calendar ==
Round		Location	Circuit	Date	Supporting
1	R1	Oschersleben, Germany	Motorsport Arena Oschersleben	22 April	39. ADAC Westfalen-Pokal-Rennen
1	R2	Oschersleben, Germany	Motorsport Arena Oschersleben	23 April	39. ADAC Westfalen-Pokal-Rennen
2	R1	Hockenheim, Germany	Hockenheimring	29 April	Jim Clark Revival
2	R2	Hockenheim, Germany	Hockenheimring	30 April	Jim Clark Revival
3	R1	Klettwitz, Germany	EuroSpeedway Lausitz	13 May	ADAC "Lausitz Top 10"
3	R2	Klettwitz, Germany	EuroSpeedway Lausitz	14 May	ADAC "Lausitz Top 10"
4	R1	Nürburg, Germany	Nürburgring	27 May	ACV-Sprint-Meeting
4	R2	Nürburg, Germany	Nürburgring	28 May	ACV-Sprint-Meeting
5	R1	Nürburg, Germany	Nürburgring	16 June	24 Hours Nürburgring
5	R2	Nürburg, Germany	Nürburgring	17 June	24 Hours Nürburgring
6	R1	Assen, Netherlands	TT Circuit Assen	15 July	ADAC/RSG Hansa-Pokal-Rennen
6	R2	Assen, Netherlands	TT Circuit Assen	16 July	ADAC/RSG Hansa-Pokal-Rennen
7	R1	Klettwitz, Germany	EuroSpeedway Lausitz	29 July	ADAC Eastside 100
7	R2	Klettwitz, Germany	EuroSpeedway Lausitz	30 July	ADAC Eastside 100
8	R1	Assen, Netherlands	TT Circuit Assen	12 August	Rizla Race Day
8	R2	Assen, Netherlands	TT Circuit Assen	13 August	Rizla Race Day
9	R1	Salzburg, Austria	Salzburgring	16 September	Beru Top 10 ADAC Rennsport-Festival
9	R2	Salzburg, Austria	Salzburgring	17 September	Beru Top 10 ADAC Rennsport-Festival
10	R1	Oschersleben, Germany	Motorsport Arena Oschersleben	30 September	ADAC-Börde-Preis
10	R2	Oschersleben, Germany	Motorsport Arena Oschersleben	1 October	ADAC-Börde-Preis

== Results ==
Round		Circuit	Pole position	Fastest lap	Winning driver	Winning team	Trophy Winner	Rookie Winner
1	R1	(Germany) Motorsport Arena Oschersleben	(Germany) Nico Hülkenberg	(United Kingdom) Joey Foster	(China) Ho-Pin Tung	(Belgium) JB Motorsport	(Latvia) Harald Schlegelmilch	(Netherlands) Renger van der Zande
1	R2	(Germany) Motorsport Arena Oschersleben	(Germany) Nico Hülkenberg	(United Kingdom) Joey Foster	(United Kingdom) Joey Foster	(Austria) HS Technik Motorsport	(Latvia) Harald Schlegelmilch	(United Kingdom) Joey Foster
2	R1	(Germany) Hockenheimring	(Netherlands) Ferdinand Kool	(South Korea) Récardo Bruins Choi	(United Kingdom) Joey Foster	(Austria) HS Technik Motorsport	(Latvia) Harald Schlegelmilch	(United Kingdom) Joey Foster
2	R2	(Germany) Hockenheimring	(Germany) Nico Hülkenberg	(United Kingdom) Joey Foster	(Germany) Nico Hülkenberg	(Germany) Josef Kaufmann Racing	(Germany) Johannes Theobald	(Germany) Nico Hülkenberg
3	R1	(Germany) EuroSpeedway Lausitz	(China) Ho-Pin Tung	(United Kingdom) Joey Foster	(China) Ho-Pin Tung	(Belgium) JB Motorsport	(Latvia) Harald Schlegelmilch	(United Kingdom) Joey Foster
3	R2	(Germany) EuroSpeedway Lausitz	(United Kingdom) Joey Foster	(Germany) Nico Hülkenberg	(China) Ho-Pin Tung	(Belgium) JB Motorsport	(Latvia) Harald Schlegelmilch	(Germany) Nico Hülkenberg
4	R1	(Germany) Nürburgring	(Italy) Riccardo Azzoli	(China) Ho-Pin Tung	(United Kingdom) Joey Foster	(Austria) HS Technik Motorsport	(Latvia) Harald Schlegelmilch	(United Kingdom) Joey Foster
4	R2	(Germany) Nürburgring	(Netherlands) Ferdinand Kool	(United Kingdom) Joey Foster	(United Kingdom) Joey Foster	(Austria) HS Technik Motorsport	(Germany) Johannes Theobald	(United Kingdom) Joey Foster
5	R1	(Germany) Nürburgring	(Netherlands) Ferdinand Kool	(China) Ho-Pin Tung	(China) Ho-Pin Tung	(Belgium) JB Motorsport	(Latvia) Harald Schlegelmilch	(United Kingdom) Joey Foster
5	R2	(Germany) Nürburgring	(China) Ho-Pin Tung	(China) Ho-Pin Tung	(China) Ho-Pin Tung	(Belgium) JB Motorsport	(Latvia) Harald Schlegelmilch	(Switzerland) Natacha Gachnang
6	R1	(Netherlands) TT Circuit Assen	(United Kingdom) Joey Foster	(United Kingdom) Joey Foster	(Venezuela) Johnny Cecotto Jr.	(Italy) Ombra Racing	(Latvia) Harald Schlegelmilch	(Venezuela) Johnny Cecotto Jr.
6	R2	(Netherlands) TT Circuit Assen	(United Kingdom) Joey Foster	(Germany) Nico Hülkenberg	(Latvia) Harald Schlegelmilch	(Austria) HS Technik Motorsport	(Latvia) Harald Schlegelmilch	(Latvia) Harald Schlegelmilch
7	R1	(Germany) EuroSpeedway Lausitz	(Switzerland) Cyndie Allemann	(Slovakia) Leonardo Valois	(China) Ho-Pin Tung	(Belgium) JB Motorsport	(Germany) Marcel Schuler	(Switzerland) Cyndie Allemann
7	R2	(Germany) EuroSpeedway Lausitz	(Netherlands) Ferdinand Kool	(Germany) Ronny Wechselberger	(Netherlands) Ferdinand Kool	(Belgium) JB Motorsport	(Latvia) Harald Schlegelmilch	(Latvia) Harald Schlegelmilch
8	R1	(Netherlands) TT Circuit Assen	(Latvia) Harald Schlegelmilch	(Germany) Nico Hülkenberg	(Latvia) Harald Schlegelmilch	(Austria) HS Technik Motorsport	(Latvia) Harald Schlegelmilch	(Latvia) Harald Schlegelmilch
8	R2	(Netherlands) TT Circuit Assen	(Latvia) Harald Schlegelmilch	(Latvia) Harald Schlegelmilch	(Latvia) Harald Schlegelmilch	(Austria) HS Technik Motorsport	(Latvia) Harald Schlegelmilch	(Latvia) Harald Schlegelmilch
9	R1	(Austria) Salzburgring	(Netherlands) Renger van der Zande	(Latvia) Harald Schlegelmilch	(Australia) Nathan Antunes	(Austria) HS Technik Motorsport	(Germany) Johannes Theobald	(Australia) Nathan Antunes
9	R2	(Austria) Salzburgring	(Australia) Nathan Antunes	(Germany) Nico Hülkenberg	(China) Ho-Pin Tung	(Belgium) JB Motorsport	(Latvia) Harald Schlegelmilch	(Netherlands) Renger van der Zande
10	R1	(Germany) Motorsport Arena Oschersleben	(China) Ho-Pin Tung	(China) Ho-Pin Tung	(China) Ho-Pin Tung	(Belgium) JB Motorsport	(Germany) Ronny Wechselberger	(Netherlands) Renger van der Zande
10	R2	(Germany) Motorsport Arena Oschersleben	(China) Ho-Pin Tung	(China) Ho-Pin Tung	(China) Ho-Pin Tung	(Belgium) JB Motorsport	(Germany) Ronny Wechselberger	(South Korea) Récardo Bruins Choi

== Standings ==
=== ATS Formel 3 Cup ===
- Points are awarded as follows:

1	2	3	4	5	6	7	8	PP	FL
10	8	6	5	4	3	2	1	**1**	1

Pos	Driver	OSC1 (Germany)		HOC (Germany)		LAU1 (Germany)		NÜR1 (Germany)		NÜR2 (Germany)		ASS1 (Netherlands)		LAU2 (Germany)		ASS2 (Netherlands)		SAL (Austria)		OSC2 (Germany)		Pts
1	(China) Ho-Pin Tung	1	6	6	5	**1**	1	5	2	1	**1**	6	5	1	7	6	5	2	1	**1**	**1**	145
2	(Netherlands) Ferdinand Kool	5	5	**3**	2	19	3	4	**3**	**3**	5	18	3	Ret	**1**	3	2	18	3	3	5	99
3	(Latvia) Harald Schlegelmilch	8	3	7	21	5	4	3	11	4	9	3	1	Ret	2	**1**	**1**	15	4	4	4	91
4	(Netherlands) Renger van der Zande	2	24†	4	3	3	Ret	Ret	4	7	Ret	5	6	3	4	2	4	**3**	2	2	6	89
5	(Germany) Nico Hülkenberg	**Ret**	**2**	5	**1**	4	2	16	8	5	Ret	2	2	14	8	4	3	7	13			78
6	(United Kingdom) Joey Foster	23	1	1	4	2	**Ret**	1	1	2	8	**4**	**20**									76
7	(South Korea) Récardo Bruins Choi	6	Ret	2	27†	23	Ret	DNS	5	12	4	19	7			Ret	14	8	6	6	2	38
8	(Italy) Riccardo Azzoli	4	4	8	6	6	5	**2**	7	Ret	Ret	8	10	9	10			4	9	10	13	38
9	(Switzerland) Cyndie Allemann	11	11	16	Ret	8	7	6	9	9	7	Ret	8	**2**	3	14	7	16	5	16	10	30
10	(Australia) Nathan Antunes															8	6	1	**Ret**	5	3	25
11	(Venezuela) Johnny Cecotto Jr.									19	Ret	1	4			Ret	8	5	Ret			20
12	(Brazil) Marcello Thomaz	13	14	15	13	7	Ret	Ret	12	6	2					5	10			9	12	17
13	(Switzerland) Natacha Gachnang	17	9	26†	9	14	10	9	10	8	3	Ret	12			7	12	Ret	11	7	11	11
14	(Germany) Johannes Theobald	12	13	9	8	9	15	7	6	10	11	12	22			10	9	6	7	13	15	11
15	(Italy) Salvatore Gatto	7	10	10	7	11	8	Ret	14	11	6	7	9	11	13							10
16	(Germany) Dominik Schraml	3	7	12	11																	8
17	(Germany) Ronny Wechselberger	10	8	11	10	Ret	9	22	15	14	14	11	15	15	6	9	17	9	8	11	8	7
18	(Germany) Marcel Schuler	Ret	20	28†	15	Ret	18	Ret	24	21	16	13	17	4	12	16	15	22	15	Ret	19	5
19	(Slovakia) Leonardo Valois											Ret	21	12	5	Ret	23			DNS	22	5
20	(Switzerland) Rolf Biland	16	17	14	14	16	12	10	16	17	13	Ret	14	5	9	15	19	19	16	12	17	4
21	(Japan) Hiroyuki Matsumura	9	25†	13	Ret	10	6	18	19													3
22	(Finland) Marko Nevalainen													6	11							3
23	(Netherlands) Dominick Muermans	Ret	Ret	22	Ret	17	Ret	12	20	24	10	10	13			Ret	11	14	10	8	7	3
24	(Austria) Martin Konrad	19	DNS	25	24	20	21	20	25	Ret	20	15	19	7	14			20	19	20	21	2
25	(Germany) Norman Knop	14	15	29†	17	15	16	8	18	Ret	17	Ret	Ret	8	16	19	18	Ret	DNS	18	20	2
26	(Germany) Christer Jöns	Ret	19	27	16	13	14	11	13	18	18	9	18			11	21					0
27	(Germany) Benjamin Leuchter																			14	9	0
28	(Italy) Mattia Pavoni	24	Ret	21	12	Ret	19	13	17	16	19	Ret	16	Ret	DNS	13	20	10	12	Ret	Ret	0
29	(Switzerland) Urs Rüttimann							24	23					10	15			12	23			0
30	(Sweden) Max Nilsson							15	22	15	12	14	11			12	13	11	18	15	14	0
31	(Finland) Juho Annala					12	11															0
32	(Germany) Martin Hippe	DNS	12																			0
33	(Germany) Michael Klein															20	22	13	Ret	17	16	0
34	(Italy) Luca Iannaccone	22	23	DNS	26	22	23	23	28	25	23	17	Ret	13	17	17	24	24	22	22	24	0
35	(Austria) Hannes Neuhauser									22	13											0
36	(Macau) Rodolfo Ávila					DNS	13															0
37	(Italy) Marika Diana	15	22	19	22	Ret	17	14	21	20	Ret	16	Ret									0
38	(Austria) Marco Oberhauser																	25	14			0
39	(Czech Republic) Petr Samek	Ret	18	17	20	18	20	17	29	22	15							23	17			0
40	(Germany) André Pablo Sander	20	16	18	18																	0
41	(Italy) Massimo Rossi															Ret	20	17	20	19	Ret	0
42	(Austria) Denis G. Watt	18	26†	24	23	Ret	22	21	27									21	21			0
43	(Germany) Bernd Deuling															18	25			21	23	0
44	(Germany) Christopher Kuntz			20	19																	0
45	(Germany) Helmut Ebert	21	21	23	25	21	Ret	19	26	23	21											0
Pos	Driver	OSC1 (Germany)		HOC (Germany)		LAU1 (Germany)		NÜR1 (Germany)		NÜR2 (Germany)		ASS1 (Netherlands)		LAU2 (Germany)		ASS2 (Netherlands)		SAL (Austria)		OSC2 (Germany)		Pts

Colour	Result
Gold	Winner
Silver	Second place
Bronze	Third place
Green	Points classification
Blue	Non-points classification
Blue	Non-classified finish (NC)
Purple	Retired, not classified (Ret)
Red	Did not qualify (DNQ)
Red	Did not pre-qualify (DNPQ)
Black	Disqualified (DSQ)
White	Did not start (DNS)
White	Withdrew (WD)
White	Race cancelled (C)
Blank	Did not practice (DNP)
Blank	Did not arrive (DNA)
Blank	Excluded (EX)

**Bold** - Pole
Italics - Fastest Lap

=== Trophy ===
- Points are awarded as follows:

1	2	3	4	5	6	7	8
10	8	6	5	4	3	2	1

Pos	Driver	OSC1 (Germany)		HOC (Germany)		LAU1 (Germany)		NÜR1 (Germany)		NÜR2 (Germany)		ASS1 (Netherlands)		LAU2 (Germany)		ASS2 (Netherlands)		SAL (Austria)		OSC2 (Germany)		Pts
1	(Latvia) Harald Schlegelmilch	8	3	7	21	5	4	3	11	4	9	3	1	Ret	2	1	1	15	4			152
2	(Germany) Johannes Theobald	12	13	9	8	9	15	7	6	10	11	12	22			10	9	6	7	13	15	126
3	(Germany) Ronny Wechselberger	10	8	11	10	Ret	9	22	15	14	14	11	15	15	6	9	17	9	8	11	8	118
4	(Switzerland) Rolf Biland	16	17	14	14	16	12	10	16	17	13	Ret	14	5	9	15	19	19	16	12	17	93
5	(Germany) Marcel Schuler	Ret	20	28†	15	Ret	18	Ret	24	21	16	13	17	4	12	16	15	22	15	Ret	19	50
6	(Germany) Christer Jöns	Ret	19	27	16	13	14	11	13	18	18	9	18			11	21					48
7	(Austria) Martin Konrad	19	DNS	25	24	20	21	20	25	Ret	20	15	19	7	14			20	19	20	21	28
8	(Czech Republic) Petr Samek	Ret	18	17	20	18	20	17	29	22	15							23	17			19
9	(Germany) Michael Klein															20	22	13	Ret	17	16	18
10	(Brazil) Marcello Thomaz	13	14	15	13																	18
11	(Switzerland) Natacha Gachnang	17	9	26†	9																	17
12	(Slovakia) Leonardo Valois											Ret	21	12	5	Ret	23			DNS	22	16
13	(Switzerland) Urs Rüttimann							24	23					10	15			12	23			13
14	(Finland) Juho Annala					12	11															12
15	(Finland) Marko Nevalainen													6	11							10
16	(Italy) Luca Iannaccone	22	23	DNS	26	22	23	23	28	25	23	17	Ret	13	17	17	24	24	22	22	24	7
17	(Japan) Hiroyuki Matsumura							18	19													6
18	(Germany) André Pablo Sander	20	16	18	18																	6
19	(Austria) Marco Oberhauser																	25	14			5
20	(Italy) Marika Diana									20	Ret	16	Ret									5
21	(Germany) Bernd Deuling															18	25			21	23	5
22	(Germany) Helmut Ebert	21	21	23	25	21	Ret	19	26	23	21											3
23	(Austria) Denis G. Watt	18	26†	24	23	Ret	22	21	27									21	21			3
24	(Germany) Christopher Kuntz			20	19																	1
Pos	Driver	OSC1 (Germany)		HOC (Germany)		LAU1 (Germany)		NÜR1 (Germany)		NÜR2 (Germany)		ASS1 (Netherlands)		LAU2 (Germany)		ASS2 (Netherlands)		SAL (Austria)		OSC2 (Germany)		Pts

- † — Drivers did not finish the race, but were classified as they completed over 90% of the race distance.

=== Rookie ===
- Points are awarded as follows:

1	2	3	4	5	6	7	8
10	8	6	5	4	3	2	1

Pos	Driver	OSC1 (Germany)		HOC (Germany)		LAU1 (Germany)		NÜR1 (Germany)		NÜR2 (Germany)		ASS1 (Netherlands)		LAU2 (Germany)		ASS2 (Netherlands)		SAL (Austria)		OSC2 (Germany)		Pts
1	(Latvia) Harald Schlegelmilch	8	3	7	21	5	4	3	11	4	9	3	1	Ret	2	1	1	15	4	4	4	117
2	(Netherlands) Renger van der Zande	2	24	4	3	3	Ret	Ret	4	7	Ret	5	6	3	4	2	4	3	2	2	6	115
3	(Germany) Nico Hülkenberg	Ret	2	5	1	4	2	16	8	5	Ret	2	2	14	8	4	3	7	13			90
4	(United Kingdom) Joey Foster	23	1	1	4	2	Ret	1	1	2	8	4	20									75
5	(Switzerland) Cyndie Allemann	11	11	16	Ret	8	7	6	9	9	7	Ret	8	2	3	14	7	16	5	16	10	63
6	(South Korea) Récardo Bruins Choi	6	Ret	2	27	23	Ret	DNS	5	12	4	19	7			Ret	14	8	6	6	2	59
7	(Switzerland) Natacha Gachnang	17	9	26	9	14	10	9	10	8	3	Ret	12			7	12	Ret	11	7	11	46
8	(Italy) Salvatore Gatto	7	10	10	7	11	8	Ret	14	11	6	7	9	11	13							41
9	(Germany) Ronny Wechselberger	10	8	11	10	Ret	9	22	15	14	14	11	15	15	6	9	17	9	8	11	8	37
10	(Australia) Nathan Antunes															8	6	1	Ret	5	3	33
11	(Venezuela) Johnny Cecotto Jr.									19	Ret	1	4			Ret	8	5	Ret			25
12	(Netherlands) Dominick Muermans	Ret	Ret	22	Ret	17	Ret	12	20	24	10	10	13			Ret	11	14	10	8	7	19
13	(Switzerland) Rolf Biland	16	17	14	14	16	12	10	16	17	13	Ret	14	5	9	15	19	19	16	12	17	15
14	(Japan) Hiroyuki Matsumura	9	25	13	Ret	10	6	18	19													14
15	(Slovakia) Leonardo Valois											Ret	21	12	5	Ret	23			DNS	22	8
16	(Italy) Mattia Pavoni	24	Ret	21	12	Ret	19	13	17	16	19	Ret	16	Ret	DNS	13	20	10	12	Ret	Ret	8
17	(Germany) Marcel Schuler	Ret	20	28	15	Ret	18	Ret	24	21	16	13	17	4	12	16	15	22	15	Ret	19	7
18	(Sweden) Max Nilsson							15	22	15	12	14	11			12	13	11	18	15	14	3
19	(Germany) Benjamin Leuchter																			14	9	2
20	(Italy) Marika Diana	15	22	19	22	Ret	17	14	21	20	Ret	16	Ret									2
21	(Germany) André Pablo Sander	20	16	18	18																	1
Pos	Driver	OSC1 (Germany)		HOC (Germany)		LAU1 (Germany)		NÜR1 (Germany)		NÜR2 (Germany)		ASS1 (Netherlands)		LAU2 (Germany)		ASS2 (Netherlands)		SAL (Austria)		OSC2 (Germany)		Pts

- † — Drivers did not finish the race, but were classified as they completed over 90% of the race distance.
