= 2012 Silverstone GP2 Series round =

2012 GP2 race held in the United Kingdom

(United Kingdom) 2012 Silverstone GP2 round
Round details
- Round 7 of 12 rounds in the 2012 GP2 Series
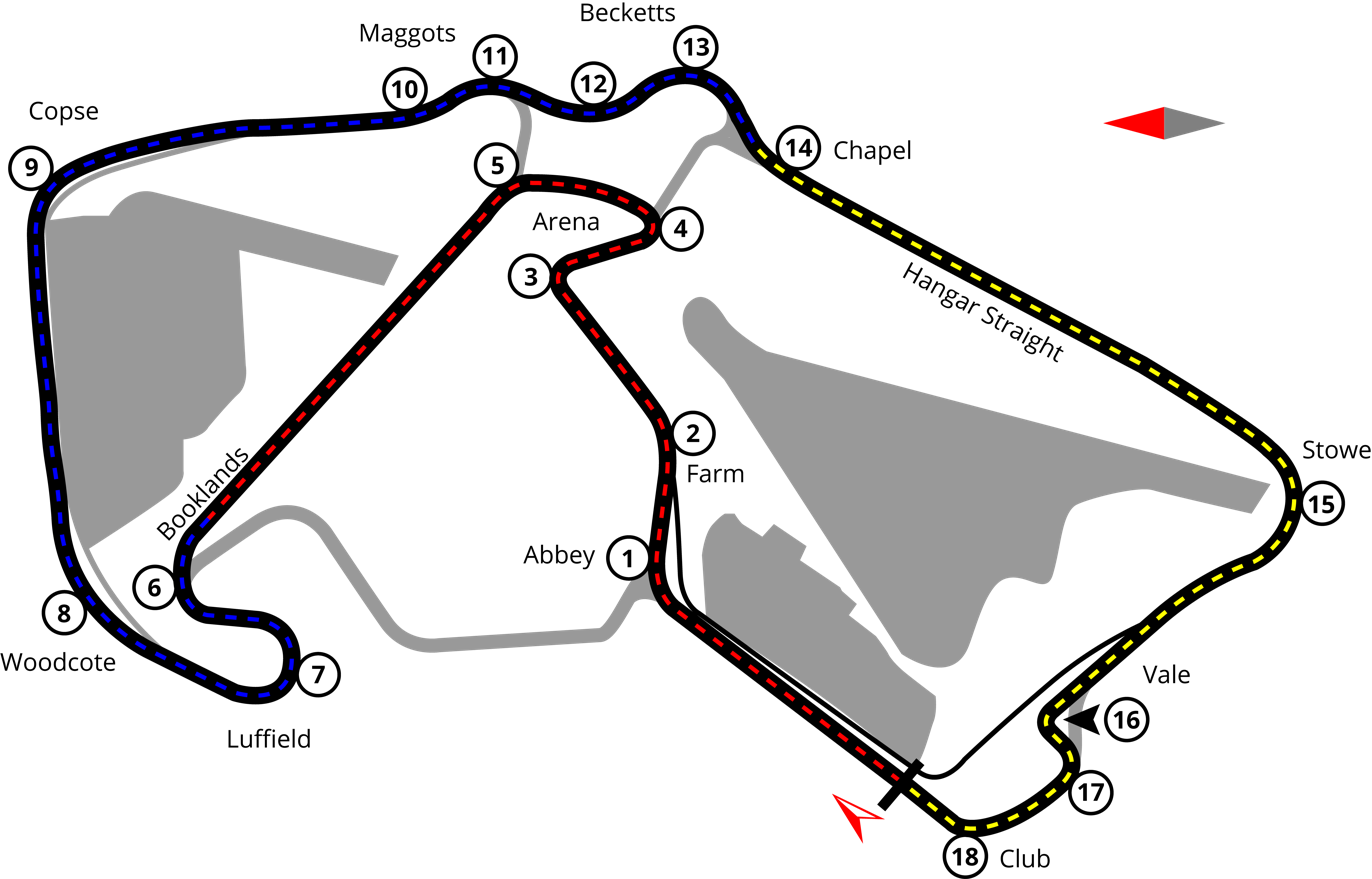
- Silverstone Circuit
- Location: Silverstone Circuit, Northamptonshire and Buckinghamshire, England
- Course: Permanent racing circuit 5.901 km (3.667 mi)

GP2 Series

Feature race
- Date: 7 July 2012
- Laps: 25 (Note: The GP2 Series feature race was scheduled to take place over 29 laps. However, heavy rain prompted race stewards to shorten the race to the first full lap after one hour of racing.)

Pole position
| Driver | (Switzerland) Fabio Leimer | Racing Engineering |
- Time: 2:01.889

Podium
| First | (Mexico) Esteban Gutiérrez | Lotus GP |
| Second | (Venezuela) Johnny Cecotto Jr. | Barwa Addax Team |
| Third | (United Kingdom) Jolyon Palmer | iSport International |

Fastest lap
| Driver | (Mexico) Esteban Gutiérrez | Lotus GP |
- Time: 2:01.622 (on lap 25)

Sprint race
- Date: 8 July 2012
- Laps: 21

Podium
| First | (Brazil) Luiz Razia | Arden International |
| Second | (Italy) Davide Valsecchi | DAMS |
| Third | (Brazil) Felipe Nasr | DAMS |

Fastest lap
| Driver | (Colombia) Julián Leal (Note: Julián Leal set the fastest lap, but did not finish in the top 10, so was ineligible to be the point-scorer for the fastest lap. Marcus Ericsson was the point-scorer instead for setting the fastest lap of those finishing in the top 10.) | Trident Racing |
- Time: 1:43.374 (on lap 19)

The 2012 Silverstone GP2 Series round was a GP2 Series motor race held on 7 and 8 July 2012 at Silverstone Circuit in Silverstone, United Kingdom. It was the seventh round of the 2012 GP2 Season.

Mexican Esteban Gutierrez won the feature race while Brazilian Luiz Razia won the sprint race. Series leader Valsecchi was penalized and sent to the back of the starting grid due to the infringement of a technical regulation related to the quantity of fuel available after the qualifying session. As a result, Razia ended up leading the GP2 Championship after Silverstone.

== Classification ==
=== Qualifying ===
| Pos. | No. | Driver | Team | Time | Grid |
|---|---|---|---|---|---|
| 1 | 5 | (Switzerland) Fabio Leimer | Racing Engineering | 2:01.889 | 1 |
| 2 | 1 | (Venezuela) Johnny Cecotto Jr. | Barwa Addax Team | 2:02.804 | 2 |
| 3 | 8 | (United Kingdom) Jolyon Palmer | iSport International | 2:02.872 | 3 |
| 4 | 14 | (Monaco) Stefano Coletti | Scuderia Coloni | 2:03.004 | 23^{1} |
| 5 | 10 | (Mexico) Esteban Gutiérrez | Lotus GP | 2:03.258 | 4 |
| 6 | 9 | (United Kingdom) James Calado | Lotus GP | 2:03.274 | 5 |
| 7 | 27 | (Indonesia) Rio Haryanto | Carlin | 2:03.398 | 6 |
| 8 | 26 | (United Kingdom) Max Chilton | Carlin | 2:03.432 | 7 |
| 9 | 23 | (Brazil) Luiz Razia | Arden International | 2:03.553 | 8 |
| 10 | 12 | (Netherlands) Giedo van der Garde | Caterham Racing | 2:03.565 | 20^{2} |
| 11 | 4 | (Brazil) Felipe Nasr | DAMS | 2:03.581 | 24^{1} |
| 12 | 3 | (Italy) Davide Valsecchi | DAMS | 2:03.600 | 26^{3} |
| 13 | 25 | (Netherlands) Nigel Melker | Ocean Racing Technology | 2:03.699 | 9 |
| 14 | 2 | (Czech Republic) Josef Král | Barwa Addax Team | 2:04.029 | 10 |
| 15 | 6 | (France) Nathanaël Berthon | Racing Engineering | 2:04.240 | 11 |
| 16 | 18 | (Italy) Fabrizio Crestani | Venezuela GP Lazarus | 2:04.280 | 12 |
| 17 | 11 | (Venezuela) Rodolfo González | Caterham Racing | 2:04.430 | 13 |
| 18 | 7 | (Sweden) Marcus Ericsson | iSport International | 2:04.767 | 25^{1} |
| 19 | 21 | (Netherlands) Daniël de Jong | Rapax | 2:04.782 | 14 |
| 20 | 24 | (Brazil) Víctor Guerin | Ocean Racing Technology | 2:05.040 | 15 |
| 21 | 17 | (Colombia) Julián Leal | Trident Racing | 2:05.218 | 16 |
| 22 | 15 | (Italy) Fabio Onidi | Scuderia Coloni | 2:05.350 | 17 |
| 23 | 22 | (Switzerland) Simon Trummer | Arden International | 2:05.537 | 18 |
| 24 | 16 | (Monaco) Stéphane Richelmi | Trident Racing | 2:05.677 | 19 |
| 25 | 20 | (Portugal) Ricardo Teixeira | Rapax | 2:07.231 | 21 |
| 26 | 19 | (Venezuela) Giancarlo Serenelli | Venezuela GP Lazarus | 2:09.161 | 22 |

Notes

- ^1 — Stefano Coletti, Felipe Nasr and Marcus Ericsson were all excluded from qualifying for technical irregularities, and moved to the back of the grid.
- ^2 — Giedo van der Garde was given a ten-place grid penalty for overtaking another car during a red-flag period.
- ^3 — Davide Valsecchi was given a ten-place grid penalty for overtaking another car during a red-flag period, but was then found to be in violation of the same regulation as Coletti, Nasr and Ericsson, and was moved to the back of the grid.

=== Feature race ===
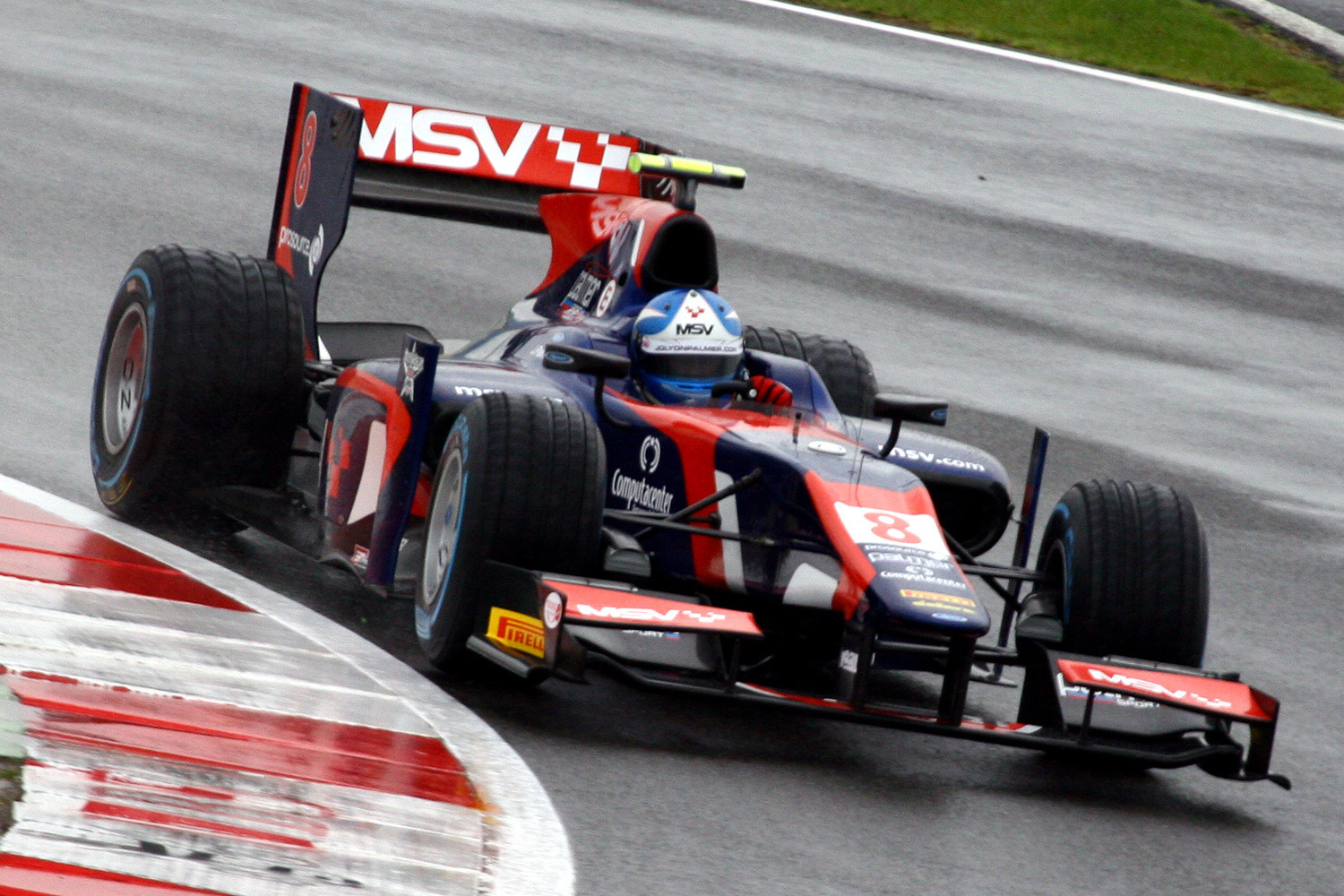
Jolyon Palmer

| Pos. | No. | Driver | Team | Laps | Time/Retired | Grid | Points |
|---|---|---|---|---|---|---|---|
| 1 | 10 | (Mexico) Esteban Gutiérrez | Lotus GP | 25 | 1:00:22.657 | 4 | 27 (25+2) |
| 2 | 1 | (Venezuela) Johnny Cecotto Jr. | Barwa Addax Team | 25 | +1.700 | 2 | 18 |
| 3 | 8 | (United Kingdom) Jolyon Palmer | iSport International | 25 | +5.257 | 3 | 15 |
| 4 | 25 | (Netherlands) Nigel Melker | Ocean Racing Technology | 25 | +6.368 | 9 | 12 |
| 5 | 23 | (Brazil) Luiz Razia | Arden International | 25 | +6.523 | 8 | 10 |
| 6 | 4 | (Brazil) Felipe Nasr | DAMS | 25 | +7.552 | 24 | 8 |
| 7 | 3 | (Italy) Davide Valsecchi | DAMS | 25 | +9.051 | 26 | 6 |
| 8 | 12 | (Netherlands) Giedo van der Garde | Caterham Racing | 25 | +9.841 | 20 | 4 |
| 9 | 26 | (United Kingdom) Max Chilton | Carlin | 25 | +11.116 | 7 | 2 |
| 10 | 27 | (Indonesia) Rio Haryanto | Carlin | 25 | +11.958 | 6 | 1 |
| 11 | 18 | (Italy) Fabrizio Crestani | Venezuela GP Lazarus | 25 | +12.130 | 12 | |
| 12 | 6 | (France) Nathanaël Berthon | Racing Engineering | 25 | +12.843 | 11 | |
| 13 | 16 | (Monaco) Stéphane Richelmi | Trident Racing | 25 | +15.701 | 19 | |
| 14 | 5 | (Switzerland) Fabio Leimer | Racing Engineering | 25 | +16.421 | 1 | 4 |
| 15 | 22 | (Switzerland) Simon Trummer | Arden International | 25 | +16.818 | 18 | |
| 16 | 2 | (Czech Republic) Josef Král | Barwa Addax Team | 25 | +17.833 | 10 | |
| 17 | 24 | (Brazil) Víctor Guerin | Ocean Racing Technology | 25 | +18.167 | 15 | |
| 18 | 20 | (Portugal) Ricardo Teixeira | Rapax | 25 | +23.183 | 20 | |
| 19 | 19 | (Venezuela) Giancarlo Serenelli | Venezuela GP Lazarus | 25 | +24.345 | 21 | |
| 20 | 17 | (Colombia) Julián Leal | Trident Racing | 25 | +38.351 | 16 | |
| 21 | 7 | (Sweden) Marcus Ericsson | iSport International | 25 | +39.831 | 25 | |
| 22 | 15 | (Italy) Fabio Onidi | Scuderia Coloni | 25 | +44.902 | 17 | |
| 23 | 11 | (Venezuela) Rodolfo González | Caterham Racing | 23 | +2 laps | 13 | |
| Ret | 14 | (Monaco) Stefano Coletti | Scuderia Coloni | 20 | Retired | 23 | |
| Ret | 9 | (United Kingdom) James Calado | Lotus GP | 17 | Retired | 5 | |
| Ret | 21 | (Netherlands) Daniël de Jong | Rapax | 1 | Retired | 14 | |
Fastest lap: Esteban Gutiérrez (Lotus GP) — 2:01.622 (on lap 25)

=== Sprint race ===
| Pos. | No. | Driver | Team | Laps | Time/Retired | Grid | Points |
|---|---|---|---|---|---|---|---|
| 1 | 23 | (Brazil) Luiz Razia | Arden International | 21 | 37:28.656 | 4 | 15 |
| 2 | 3 | (Italy) Davide Valsecchi | DAMS | 21 | +5.642 | 2 | 12 |
| 3 | 4 | (Brazil) Felipe Nasr | DAMS | 21 | +17.775 | 3 | 10 |
| 4 | 10 | (Mexico) Esteban Gutiérrez | Lotus GP | 21 | +19.969 | 8 | 8 |
| 5 | 8 | (United Kingdom) Jolyon Palmer | iSport International | 21 | +25.869 | 6 | 6 |
| 6 | 25 | (Netherlands) Nigel Melker | Ocean Racing Technology | 21 | +28.600 | 5 | 4 |
| 7 | 7 | (Sweden) Marcus Ericsson | iSport International | 21 | +31.980 | 21 | 4 (2+2) |
| 8 | 15 | (Italy) Fabio Onidi | Scuderia Coloni | 21 | +35.797 | 22 | 1 |
| 9 | 5 | (Switzerland) Fabio Leimer | Racing Engineering | 21 | +38.127 | 14 | |
| 10 | 2 | (Czech Republic) Josef Král | Barwa Addax Team | 21 | +40.378 | 16 | |
| 11 | 22 | (Switzerland) Simon Trummer | Arden International | 21 | +40.533 | 15 | |
| 12 | 27 | (Indonesia) Rio Haryanto | Carlin | 21 | +48.471 | 10 | |
| 13 | 21 | (Netherlands) Daniël de Jong | Rapax | 21 | +54.161 | 26 | |
| 14 | 6 | (France) Nathanaël Berthon | Racing Engineering | 21 | +54.643 | 12 | |
| 15 | 20 | (Portugal) Ricardo Teixeira | Rapax | 21 | +1:15.967 | 18 | |
| 16 | 19 | (Venezuela) Giancarlo Serenelli | Venezuela GP Lazarus | 21 | +1:17.971 | 19 | |
| 17 | 17 | (Colombia) Julián Leal | Trident Racing | 21 | +1:30.456 | 20 | |
| 18 | 1 | (Venezuela) Johnny Cecotto Jr. | Barwa Addax Team | 20 | Retired | 7 | |
| 19 | 26 | (United Kingdom) Max Chilton | Carlin | 19 | Retired | 9 | |
| 20 | 9 | (United Kingdom) James Calado | Lotus GP | 19 | Retired | 25 | |
| 21 | 12 | (Netherlands) Giedo van der Garde | Caterham Racing | 19 | Retired | 1 | |
| 22 | 18 | (Italy) Fabrizio Crestani | Venezuela GP Lazarus | 19 | Retired | 11 | |
| Ret | 11 | (Venezuela) Rodolfo González | Caterham Racing | 3 | Retired | 23 | |
| Ret | 16 | (Monaco) Stéphane Richelmi | Trident Racing | 0 | Retired | 13 | |
| Ret | 14 | (Monaco) Stefano Coletti | Scuderia Coloni | 0 | Retired | 24 | |
| Ret | 24 | (Brazil) Víctor Guerin | Ocean Racing Technology | 0 | Retired | 17 | |
Fastest lap: Julián Leal (Trident Racing) — 1:43.374 (on lap 19)

== Standings after the round ==
Drivers' Championship standings

| | Pos | Driver | Points |
|---|---|---|---|
| 1 | 1 | (Brazil) Luiz Razia | 165 |
| 1 | 2 | (Italy) Davide Valsecchi | 159 |
| 3 | 3 | (Mexico) Esteban Gutiérrez | 122 |
| 1 | 4 | (United Kingdom) James Calado | 95 |
| 1 | 5 | (United Kingdom) Max Chilton | 95 |

Teams' Championship standings

| Pos | Team | Points |
|---|---|---|
| 1 | (France) Lotus GP | 217 |
| 2 | (France) DAMS | 205 |
| 3 | (United Kingdom) Arden International | 169 |
| 4 | (United Kingdom) Carlin | 122 |
| 5 | (Spain) Racing Engineering | 110 |

- Note: Only the top five positions are included for both sets of standings.

== See also ==
- 2012 British Grand Prix
- 2012 Silverstone GP3 Series round

== Notes ==
| Previous round: 2012 Valencia GP2 Series round | GP2 Series; 2012 season | Next round: 2012 Hockenheimring GP2 Series round |
| Previous round: 2011 Silverstone GP2 Series round | Silverstone GP2 round | Next round: 2013 Silverstone GP2 Series round |
