= 2010 FIA Formula Two Championship =

Motor racing season

2010 FIA Formula Two season

Seasons
- ← 2009 2011 →

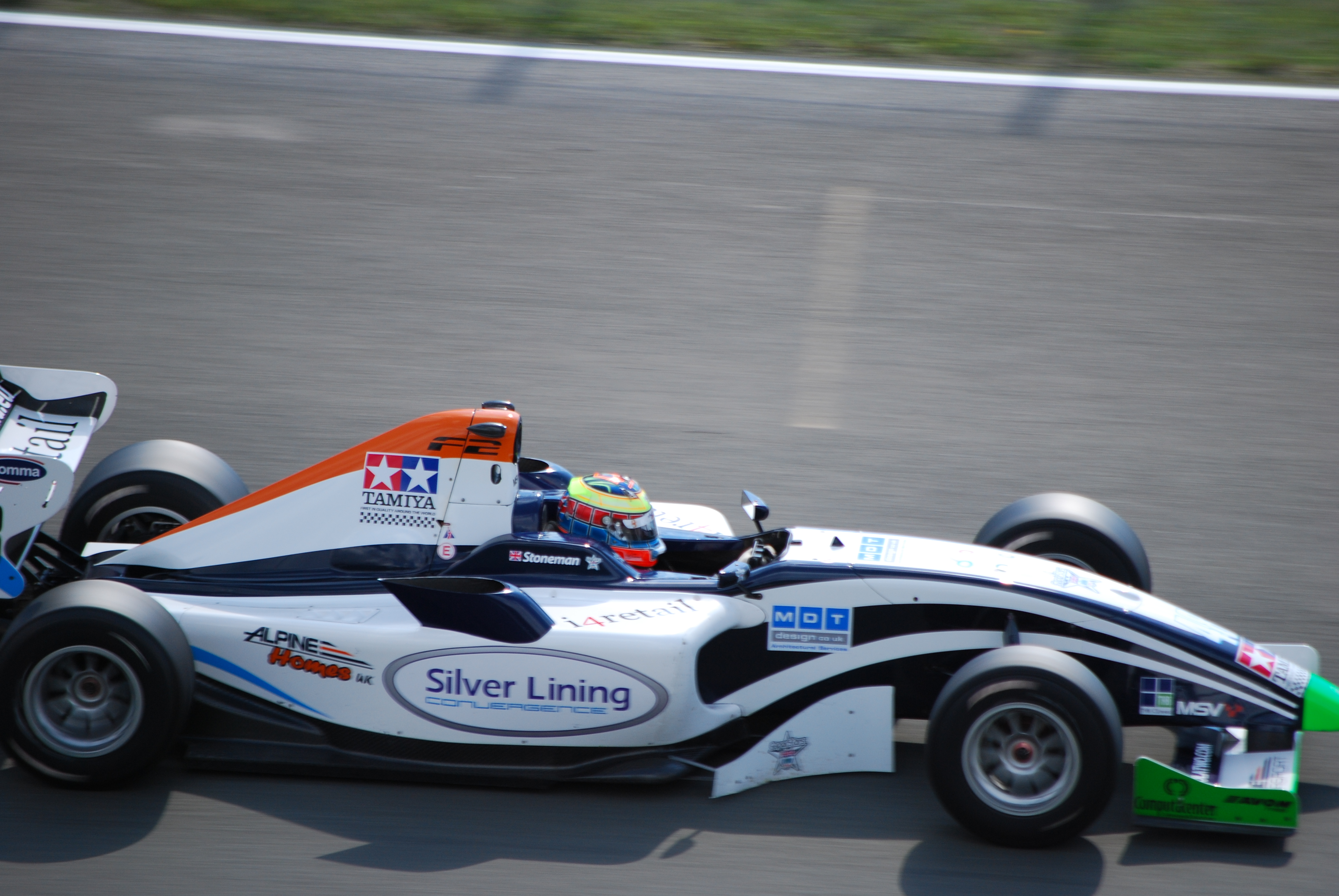
With six victories, Dean Stoneman won the championship by 42 points from nearest rival Jolyon Palmer.

The 2010 FIA Formula Two Championship season was the second year of the FIA Formula Two Championship. The championship began on 18 April at Silverstone and concluded on 19 September at the Circuit Ricardo Tormo in Valencia, after nine double-header rounds.

For most of the season, the championship battle revolved around a pair of British drivers, returning driver Jolyon Palmer and Formula Renault UK graduate Dean Stoneman. Stoneman and Palmer won eleven of the season's eighteen races – Stoneman won six and Palmer five – but more podiums for Stoneman helped him in the long run, and eventually sealed the championship title, and a prize test for the Williams F1 team, with a race to spare. Palmer finished a comfortable second place in the standings, 42 points behind Stoneman and 85 ahead of his nearest rival.

Third place in the standings remained a five-way battle until the final race with newcomers Sergey Afanasyev of Russia, another British driver Will Bratt and Belgium's Benjamin Bailly, as well as returnees Kazim Vasiliauskas of Lithuania and Austria's Philipp Eng all in contention for the remaining FIA Super Licence awarded to the top three championship finishers. Despite not winning a race, it was Afanasyev that prevailed, scoring points in all but three races including four podiums. Vasiliauskas' only victory of the season came in the final race of the season in Valencia, and allowed him to jump from seventh pre-race to an end fourth place in the standings, four points behind Afanasyev. Bratt finished fifth, winless but with four podiums, ahead of three-time winner Eng by two points and Bailly, a winner at his home round of Zolder was 12 points further behind. Eighth-placed Nicola de Marco was the only other race-winner on the season, winning at Brno and Valencia.

== Regulation changes ==
As announced at the FIA's World Motor Sport Council meeting in December 2009, Formula Two cars in the 2010 season had a base power of 425 brake horsepower (317 kW; 431 PS), up from 400 brake horsepower (298 kW; 406 PS) in 2009. The overboost also increased from 50 brake horsepower (37 kW; 51 PS) to 55 brake horsepower (41 kW; 56 PS), giving a maximum power of 480 brake horsepower (358 kW; 487 PS). Races were also extended to 40 minutes in duration, and implemented the 25–18–15–12–10–8–6–4–2–1 point-scoring system as was introduced to the 2010 Formula One World Championship.

== Drivers ==
The number of drivers admitted to the series had been expected to increase to 30. However, this was altered back to 24, with only 22 drivers appearing on the Silverstone entry list.

No.	Driver	Rounds
2	(United Kingdom) Will Bratt	All
3	(United Kingdom) Jolyon Palmer	All
4	(Belgium) Benjamin Bailly	All
5	(Angola) Ricardo Teixeira	All
6	(India) Armaan Ebrahim	All
7	(Russia) Ivan Samarin	All
8	(Bulgaria) Plamen Kralev	All
9	(Romania) Mihai Marinescu	All
10	(France) Benjamin Lariche	All
11	(United Kingdom) Jack Clarke	All
12	(Netherlands) Kelvin Snoeks	1–5, 7–9
14	(Russia) Sergey Afanasyev	All
16	(Spain) Ramón Piñeiro	9
17	(Denmark) Johan Jokinen	1–3
19	(Italy) Nicola de Marco	All
21	(Lithuania) Kazim Vasiliauskas	All
22	(Germany) Johannes Theobald	8–9
24	(United Kingdom) Tom Gladdis	1, 6–7
26	(India) Parthiva Sureshwaren	1–6
27	(United Kingdom) Paul Rees	1–4
28	(India) Ajith Kumar	1–3
28	(Germany) Julian Theobald	6–8
33	(Austria) Philipp Eng	All
48	(United Kingdom) Dean Stoneman	All
77	(Poland) Natalia Kowalska	1–7, 9

=== Driver changes ===
Entering FIA Formula Two Championship

- Russian drivers Sergey Afanasyev – who was International Formula Master runner-up – and Ivan Samarin made their debut in the series.
- Formul'Academy Euro Series champion Benjamin Bailly graduated to the championship.
- Euroseries 3000 champion Will Bratt debuted in the series.
- Johan Jokinen switched from the Formula 3 Euro Series to the championship.
- After all taking a year's sabbatical, Natalia Kowalska, Ajith Kumar and Julian Theobald all returned to racing competition.
- International GT Open driver Plamen Kralev switched to Formula Two.
- Benjamin Lariche, who had a dual programme in the Formula Renault Eurocup and the Formula Renault 2.0 West European Cup in 2009, joined the championship.
- Mihai Marinescu, who competed in the Formula Renault 3.5 Series with Interwetten.com Racing, joined the championship.
- Formula Palmer Audi graduates Ramón Piñeiro and Paul Rees moved into the series.
- Kelvin Snoeks, who had a season in International Formula Master joined the series' grid.
- Formula Renault UK driver Dean Stoneman made his series debut.
- A1 Grand Prix driver Parthiva Sureshwaren moved into the series.
- After competing in the GP2 Series in 2009, Ricardo Teixeira switched to the FIA Formula Two Championship.

Leaving FIA Formula Two Championship

- Third-placed Mikhail Aleshin returned to the Formula Renault 3.5 Series with Carlin.
- Mirko Bortolotti joined the Ferrari Driver Academy and moved into the GP3 Series with the Addax Team. Robert Wickens and Tobias Hegewald also moved to the series.
- Alex Brundle switched to the British Formula 3 Championship with T-Sport.
- Natacha Gachnang joined the newly created FIA GT1 World Championship with Matech Competition.
- Pietro Gandolfi moved into the Italian Prototype Championship.
- Ollie Hancock switched to the World Sportscar Masters series.
- Sebastian Hohenthal, Jens Höing, Jason Moore and Germán Sánchez all retired from auto racing.
- Carlos Iaconelli and Edoardo Piscopo switched to Auto GP with Durango and DAMS respectively.
- Julien Jousse moved to Superleague Formula.
- Henri Karjalainen moved into the Finnish GT3 Championship.
- Miloš Pavlović took a two-year hiatus.
- Champion Andy Soucek became Virgin Racing Formula One test and reserve driver.
- Henry Surtees died in a racing accident during the series' 2009 event at Brands Hatch.
- Tristan Vautier switched to the Star Mazda Championship with Andersen Racing.

== Calendar ==
A nine-round calendar was published on 21 October 2009. The series ventured outside of Europe, racing in Marrakech, after being an all-European series in 2009.

Round		Circuit/Location	Country	Date	Supporting
1	R1	Silverstone Circuit	United Kingdom	18 April	Stand-alone event
1	R2	Silverstone Circuit	United Kingdom	18 April	Stand-alone event
2	R1	Marrakech Street Circuit	Morocco	1 May	FIA WTCC Race of Morocco
2	R2	Marrakech Street Circuit	Morocco	2 May	FIA WTCC Race of Morocco
3	R1	Autodromo Nazionale Monza	Italy	22 May	FIA WTCC Race of Italy
3	R2	Autodromo Nazionale Monza	Italy	23 May	FIA WTCC Race of Italy
4	R1	Circuit Zolder	Belgium	19 June	FIA WTCC Race of Belgium
4	R2	Circuit Zolder	Belgium	20 June	FIA WTCC Race of Belgium
5	R1	Autódromo Internacional do Algarve, Portimão	Portugal	3 July	FIA WTCC Race of Portugal
5	R2	Autódromo Internacional do Algarve, Portimão	Portugal	4 July	FIA WTCC Race of Portugal
6	R1	Brands Hatch, Kent	United Kingdom	17 July	FIA WTCC Race of UK
6	R2	Brands Hatch, Kent	United Kingdom	18 July	FIA WTCC Race of UK
7	R1	Masaryk Circuit, Brno	Czech Republic	31 July	FIA WTCC Race of the Czech Republic
7	R2	Masaryk Circuit, Brno	Czech Republic	1 August	FIA WTCC Race of the Czech Republic
8	R1	Motorsport Arena Oschersleben	Germany	4 September	FIA WTCC Race of Germany
8	R2	Motorsport Arena Oschersleben	Germany	5 September	FIA WTCC Race of Germany
9	R1	Circuit Ricardo Tormo, Valencia	Spain	18 September	FIA WTCC Race of Spain
9	R2	Circuit Ricardo Tormo, Valencia	Spain	19 September	FIA WTCC Race of Spain

== Results ==
Round		Circuit	Pole position	Fastest lap	Winning driver	Report
1	R1	(United Kingdom) Silverstone	(United Kingdom) Jolyon Palmer	(United Kingdom) Jolyon Palmer	(United Kingdom) Jolyon Palmer	Report
1	R2	(United Kingdom) Silverstone	(Austria) Philipp Eng	(Austria) Philipp Eng	(Austria) Philipp Eng	Report
2	R1	(Morocco) Marrakech	(United Kingdom) Dean Stoneman	(United Kingdom) Dean Stoneman	(United Kingdom) Dean Stoneman	Report
2	R2	(Morocco) Marrakech	(Austria) Philipp Eng	(United Kingdom) Dean Stoneman	(Austria) Philipp Eng	Report
3	R1	(Italy) Monza	(United Kingdom) Jolyon Palmer	(Denmark) Johan Jokinen	(United Kingdom) Jolyon Palmer	Report
3	R2	(Italy) Monza	(United Kingdom) Jolyon Palmer	(Romania) Mihai Marinescu	(United Kingdom) Jolyon Palmer	Report
4	R1	(Belgium) Zolder	(United Kingdom) Dean Stoneman	(United Kingdom) Dean Stoneman	(United Kingdom) Dean Stoneman	Report
4	R2	(Belgium) Zolder	(Belgium) Benjamin Bailly	(Russia) Sergey Afanasyev	(Belgium) Benjamin Bailly	Report
5	R1	(Portugal) Algarve	(United Kingdom) Jolyon Palmer	(United Kingdom) Jolyon Palmer	(United Kingdom) Jolyon Palmer	Report
5	R2	(Portugal) Algarve	(United Kingdom) Jolyon Palmer	(United Kingdom) Dean Stoneman	(United Kingdom) Dean Stoneman	Report
6	R1	(United Kingdom) Brands Hatch	(United Kingdom) Dean Stoneman	(United Kingdom) Dean Stoneman	(United Kingdom) Dean Stoneman	Report
6	R2	(United Kingdom) Brands Hatch	(Lithuania) Kazim Vasiliauskas	(United Kingdom) Dean Stoneman	(Austria) Philipp Eng	Report
7	R1	(Czech Republic) Brno	(United Kingdom) Dean Stoneman	(Italy) Nicola de Marco	(Italy) Nicola de Marco	Report
7	R2	(Czech Republic) Brno	(United Kingdom) Dean Stoneman	(United Kingdom) Jolyon Palmer	(United Kingdom) Jolyon Palmer	Report
8	R1	(Germany) Oschersleben	(Russia) Sergey Afanasyev	(Italy) Nicola de Marco	(United Kingdom) Dean Stoneman	Report
8	R2	(Germany) Oschersleben	(United Kingdom) Dean Stoneman	(Lithuania) Kazim Vasiliauskas	(United Kingdom) Dean Stoneman	Report
9	R1	(Spain) Valencia	(Italy) Nicola de Marco	(United Kingdom) Will Bratt	(Italy) Nicola de Marco	Report
9	R2	(Spain) Valencia	(Lithuania) Kazim Vasiliauskas	(Lithuania) Kazim Vasiliauskas	(Lithuania) Kazim Vasiliauskas	Report

== Standings ==
=== Drivers' Championship ===
Pos.	Driver	SIL (United Kingdom)		MAR (Morocco)		MNZ (Italy)		ZOL (Belgium)		ALG (Portugal)		BRH (United Kingdom)		BRN (Czech Republic)		OSC (Germany)		VAL (Spain)		Points
1	(United Kingdom) Dean Stoneman	2	Ret	**1**	2	2	4	**1**	3	11	1	**1**	12	**2**	**2**	1	**1**	9	3	284
2	(United Kingdom) Jolyon Palmer	**1**	2	Ret	5	**1**	**1**	2	2	**1**	**2**	8	Ret	5	1	3	12	7	13	242
3	(Russia) Sergey Afanasyev	3	6	8	7	Ret	2	4	15†	9	12	6	5	3	4	**4**	3	5	5	157
4	(Lithuania) Kazim Vasiliauskas	5	7	10	4	3	Ret	3	7	4	Ret	11	**Ret**	11	3	2	2	Ret	**1**	153
5	(United Kingdom) Will Bratt	6	5	Ret	3	4	3	14	5	Ret	5	4	3	8	10	6	7	2	15	144
6	(Austria) Philipp Eng	4	**1**	2	**1**	11	Ret	15	12	15	6	10	1	6	18	7	9	4	11	142
7	(Belgium) Benjamin Bailly	11	11	Ret	Ret	6	6	6	**1**	2	3	13	11	4	5	5	5	8	9	130
8	(Italy) Nicola de Marco	9	10	Ret	Ret	Ret	Ret	10	Ret	5	7	7	4	1	6	9	15	**1**	Ret	98
9	(United Kingdom) Jack Clarke	Ret	4	Ret	Ret	Ret	12	Ret	4	3	Ret	2	8	Ret	9	12	DNS	16	2	81
10	(India) Armaan Ebrahim	8	9	6	6	Ret	5	5	Ret	7	Ret	9	7	Ret	13	11	10	3	7	78
11	(Romania) Mihai Marinescu	7	8	Ret	14	5	16	8	6	12	4	12	6	16	11	13	6	13	6	68
12	(Russia) Ivan Samarin	DSQ	15	4	Ret	12	8	7	8	13	8	3	9	14	16	Ret	8	10	4	64
13	(Netherlands) Kelvin Snoeks	12	Ret	3	9	13	DSQ	11	10	Ret	Ret			7	8	8	4	12	8	48
14	(France) Benjamin Lariche	10	19†	9	10	8	9	Ret	9	8	10	14	10	10	7	Ret	11	6	14	33
15	(United Kingdom) Tom Gladdis	Ret	Ret									5	2	12	12					28
16	(Angola) Ricardo Teixeira	17†	14	5	Ret	16†	13	9	Ret	6	Ret	16	16	9	Ret	10	16	14	Ret	23
17	(Denmark) Johan Jokinen	Ret	3	Ret	Ret	7	Ret													21
18	(United Kingdom) Paul Rees	13	13	7	8	9	7	13	13											18
19	(Poland) Natalia Kowalska	14	12	Ret	11	Ret	14	Ret	11	10	9	15	13	Ret	14			Ret	16	3
20	(Bulgaria) Plamen Kralev	15	17	12	12	10	11	Ret	14	Ret	Ret	Ret	15	15	17	15	14	17	17	1
21	(India) Parthiva Sureshwaren	16	16	11	Ret	15	10	12	Ret	14	11	18	14							1
22	(Spain) Ramón Piñeiro																	15	10	1
23	(Germany) Johannes Theobald															16	13	11	12	0
24	(India) Ajith Kumar	18	18	13	13	14	15													0
25	(Germany) Julian Theobald											17	17	13	15	14	Ret			0
Pos	Driver	SIL (United Kingdom)		MAR (Morocco)		MNZ (Italy)		ZOL (Belgium)		ALG (Portugal)		BRH (United Kingdom)		BRN (Czech Republic)		OSC (Germany)		VAL (Spain)		Points

Colour	Result
Gold	Winner
Silver	Second place
Bronze	Third place
Green	Points classification
Blue	Non-points classification
Blue	Non-classified finish (NC)
Purple	Retired, not classified (Ret)
Red	Did not qualify (DNQ)
Red	Did not pre-qualify (DNPQ)
Black	Disqualified (DSQ)
White	Did not start (DNS)
White	Withdrew (WD)
White	Race cancelled (C)
Blank	Did not practice (DNP)
Blank	Did not arrive (DNA)
Blank	Excluded (EX)

**Bold** – Pole
Italics – Fastest Lap
† – Retired, but classified
