= Jolyon Palmer =

British racing driver and broadcaster (born 1991)

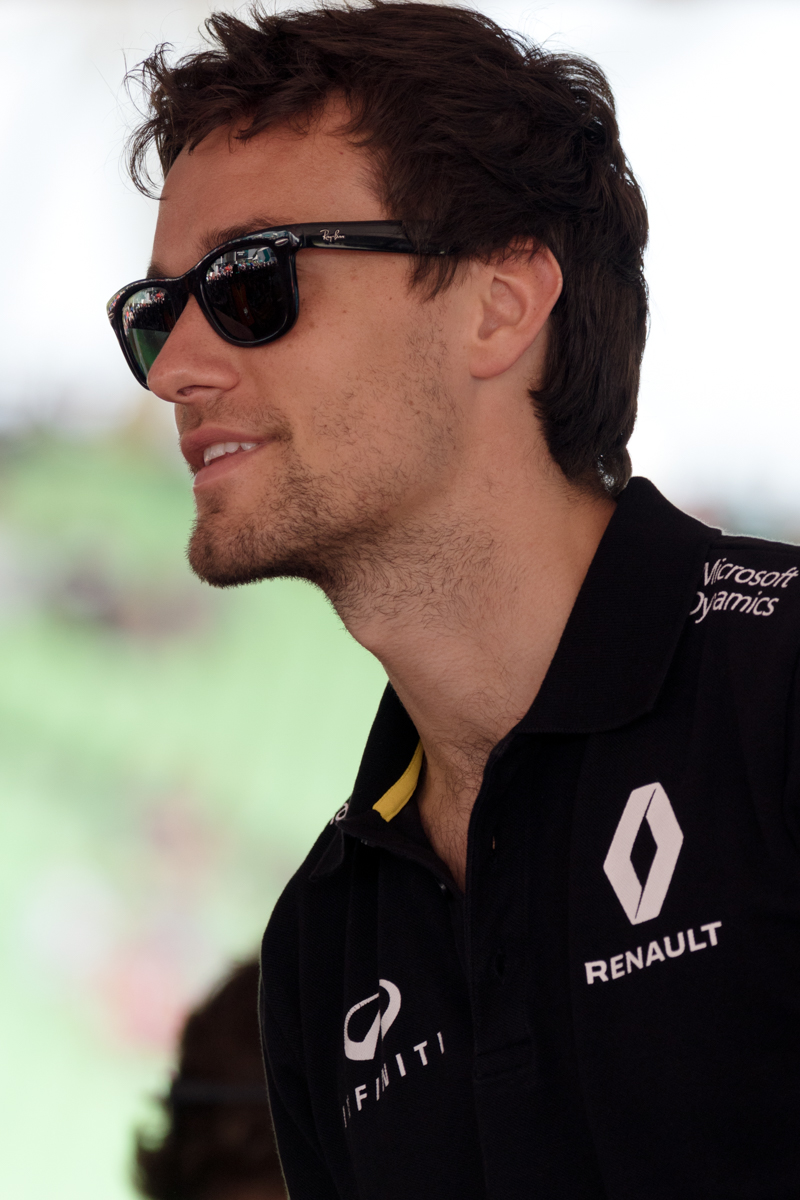
- Palmer at the 2016 Malaysian Grand Prix
- Born: Jolyon Carlyle Palmer; 20 January 1991 (age 35); Horsham, West Sussex, England
- Children: 1
- Parent: Jonathan Palmer (father)
- Relatives: Will Palmer (brother)

Formula One World Championship career
- Nationality: (United Kingdom) British
- Active years: 2016–2017
- Team: Renault
- Car number: 30
- Entries: 37 (35 starts)
- Championships: 0
- Wins: 0
- Podiums: 0
- Career points: 9
- Pole positions: 0
- Fastest laps: 0
- First entry: 2016 Australian Grand Prix
- Last entry: 2017 Japanese Grand Prix

Previous series
- 2011–2014 2011 2009–2011 2007–2008 2005–2007: GP2 Series; GP2 Asia Series; FIA Formula Two; Formula Palmer Audi; T Cars

Championship titles
- 2014 2006: GP2 Series; T Cars Autumn Trophy

Jolyon Carlyle Palmer (born 20 January 1991) is a British former racing driver, broadcaster and journalist, who competed in Formula One from 2016 to 2017. Since retiring from racing, Palmer has been a pundit for the BBC, Channel 4 and F1TV.

Prior to his media career, Palmer was a racing driver and the 2014 GP2 Series champion. Palmer drove for Renault Sport F1 Team in Formula One. He made his Formula One debut with the team at the start of the 2016 season, during which he scored his first World Championship points at the Malaysian Grand Prix. Palmer stayed with Renault for 2017 through to the Japanese Grand Prix.

Palmer, the son of former F1 driver and major UK race circuit owner Jonathan Palmer, was educated at Dorset House School, after which he attended Cranleigh School and the University of Nottingham (from which he graduated with a bachelor's degree in Management Studies in 2012). He drove for the Lotus Formula One team as a test driver in 2015, stepping up to a full-time race seat the following season when the team received manufacturer backing from Renault.

After being dropped by Renault during the 2017 season, Palmer became an F1 analyst for BBC and the F1 app alongside Jack Nicholls. He is a regular columnist on the BBC Sport website and is also a special contributor to the official F1 website, hosting Jolyon Palmer's Analysis following each Grand Prix.

== Career ==
=== T Cars (2005–2007) ===
Having spent 2004 racing in MiniMax karts, Palmer moved up to cars in 2005 and specifically the T Cars championship's Autumn Trophy – a racing series for drivers between the ages of 14 and 17. Palmer finished fifth in that championship, with a grand total of 92 points, 46 behind championship winner Adrian Quaife-Hobbs. He moved up to the main championship in 2006, earning one pole position and four podiums, and again finished fifth in the championship with 101 points, 69 behind champion Luciano Bacheta. Palmer also took part in a second Autumn Trophy, winning four of the six races. He took part in two races of the 2007 season, winning both but decided to concentrate on Formula Palmer Audi.

=== Formula Palmer Audi (2007–2008) ===
In 2007, Palmer moved to the series which his father, Jonathan, created nine years before. He finished 12th on debut at Silverstone, and his results gradually improved with him taking two wins (one at Brands Hatch and one at Oulton Park) and two pole positions at Brands, on his way to tenth in the championship. He missed the final two rounds of the championship, due to an abdominal injury suffered in a quad bike accident at his home in West Sussex, in which he nearly died as he lost a kidney, punctured a lung, suffered liver damage and lost a lot of blood.

Palmer recovered in time for the start of the 2008 season, in which he was a championship challenger right up until the last few races of the season. Palmer secured one win (at the overseas race at Spa) and 11 podiums along with three pole positions and ended up just 22 points behind Jason Moore, in third place. The Autumn Trophy and the FPA Shootout also brought third places for Palmer, taking three podiums from the six races.

=== FIA Formula Two (2009–2010) ===
2009 saw Palmer move up to the FIA Formula Two Championship, driving car number three. His best result was a sixth-place finish at Imola. He returned to the series in 2010, winning the opening race of the season at Silverstone, taking the first F2 win by a British driver since his father did so at Mugello in 1983. Palmer picked up one fifth-place finish in the next round at Marrakech, but bounced back to take both wins and the championship lead in the third round at Monza. He eventually finished second behind fellow Briton Dean Stoneman.

Palmer made a one-off return to F2 during the 2011 season at the Nürburgring, but was a non-starter in both races.

=== GP2 Series (2011–2014) ===
==== 2011 season ====
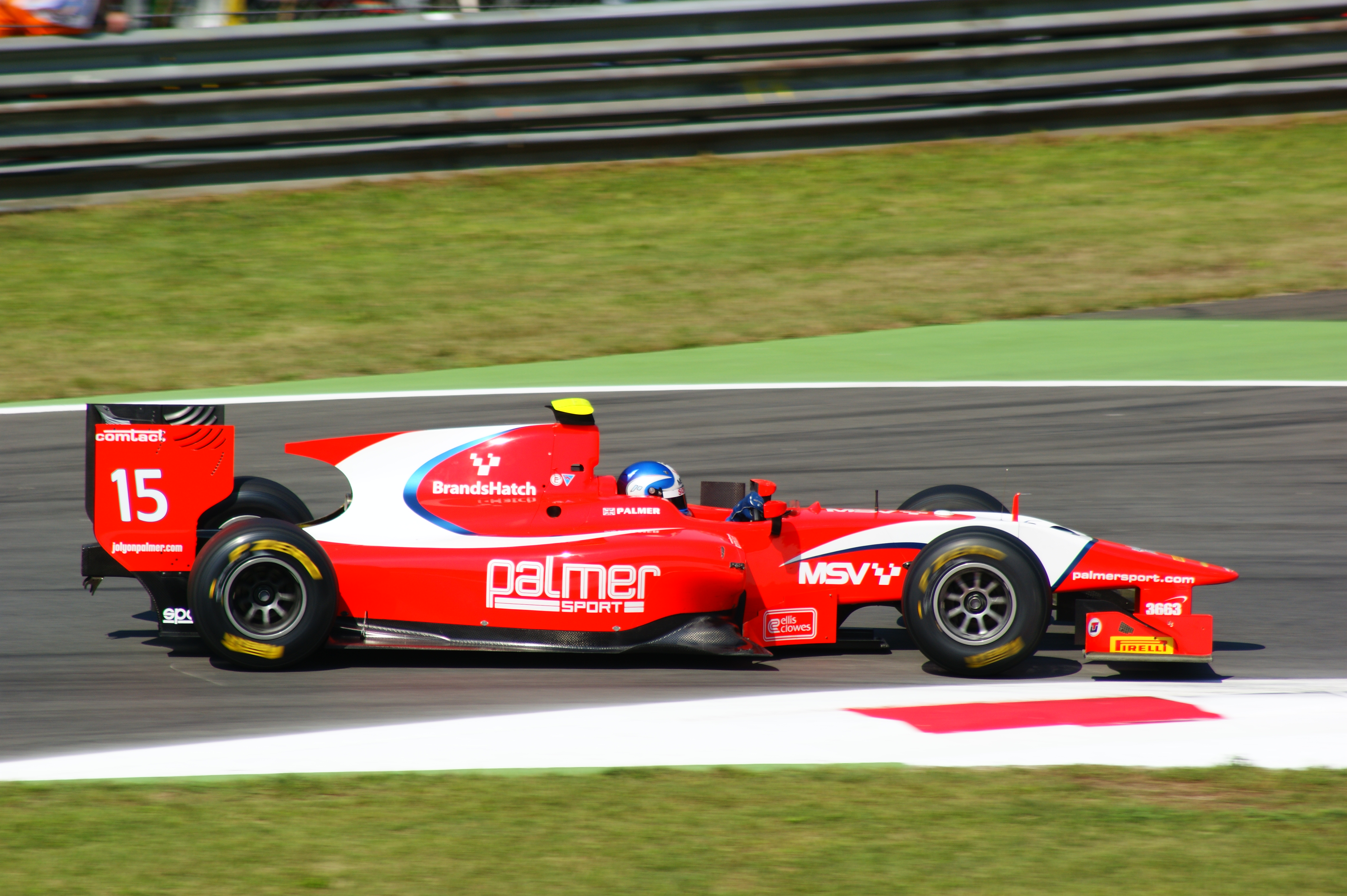
Palmer driving for Arden at the Monza round of the 2011 GP2 Series

Palmer made his GP2 Series main season debut in 2011, driving for the Arden International team alongside Josef Král. He scored a top ten finish on his debut weekend at Abu Dhabi and more top ten finishes followed at Istanbul and Valencia. A move to the Barwa Addax team for the non-championship GP2 Finals saw a breakthrough on his return to Abu Dhabi, with third and fourth places to end his debut year in the category on a high.

==== 2012 season ====
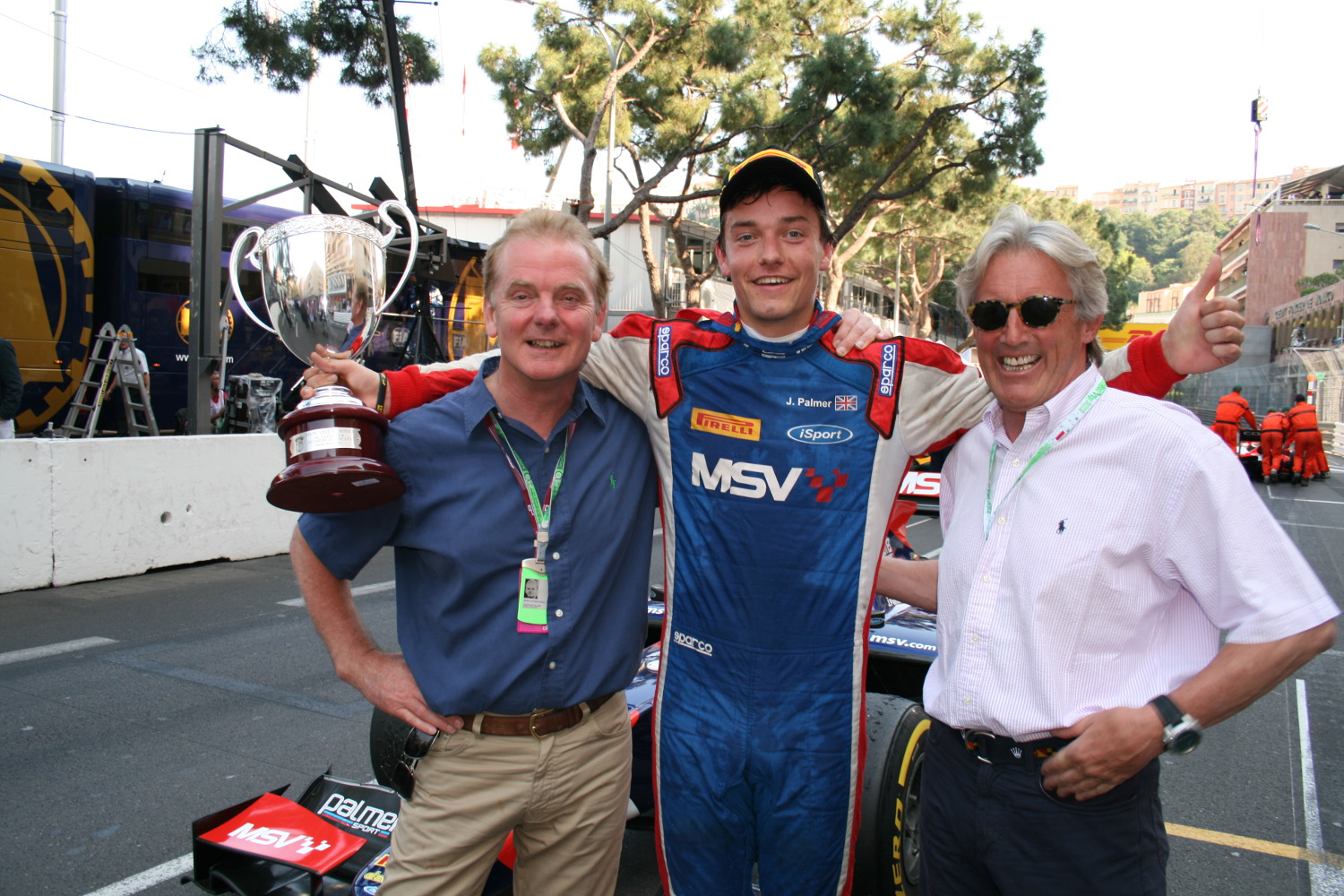
Palmer celebrates his Monaco GP2 win in 2012 with his father Jonathan

For the 2012 season, Palmer switched to the iSport International team, alongside Marcus Ericsson. Despite topping the first practice session of the year in Malaysia, persistent electrical problems blighted the early part of his season, precipitating a change of chassis. Results immediately improved and a sixth place at Monaco was followed by his maiden GP2 victory in the sprint race there. Next came a podium position at Silverstone, putting Palmer into the top-ten of the leaderboard as the season entered its second half, although he ultimately slipped to 11th despite another podium finish at Monza.

==== 2013 season ====
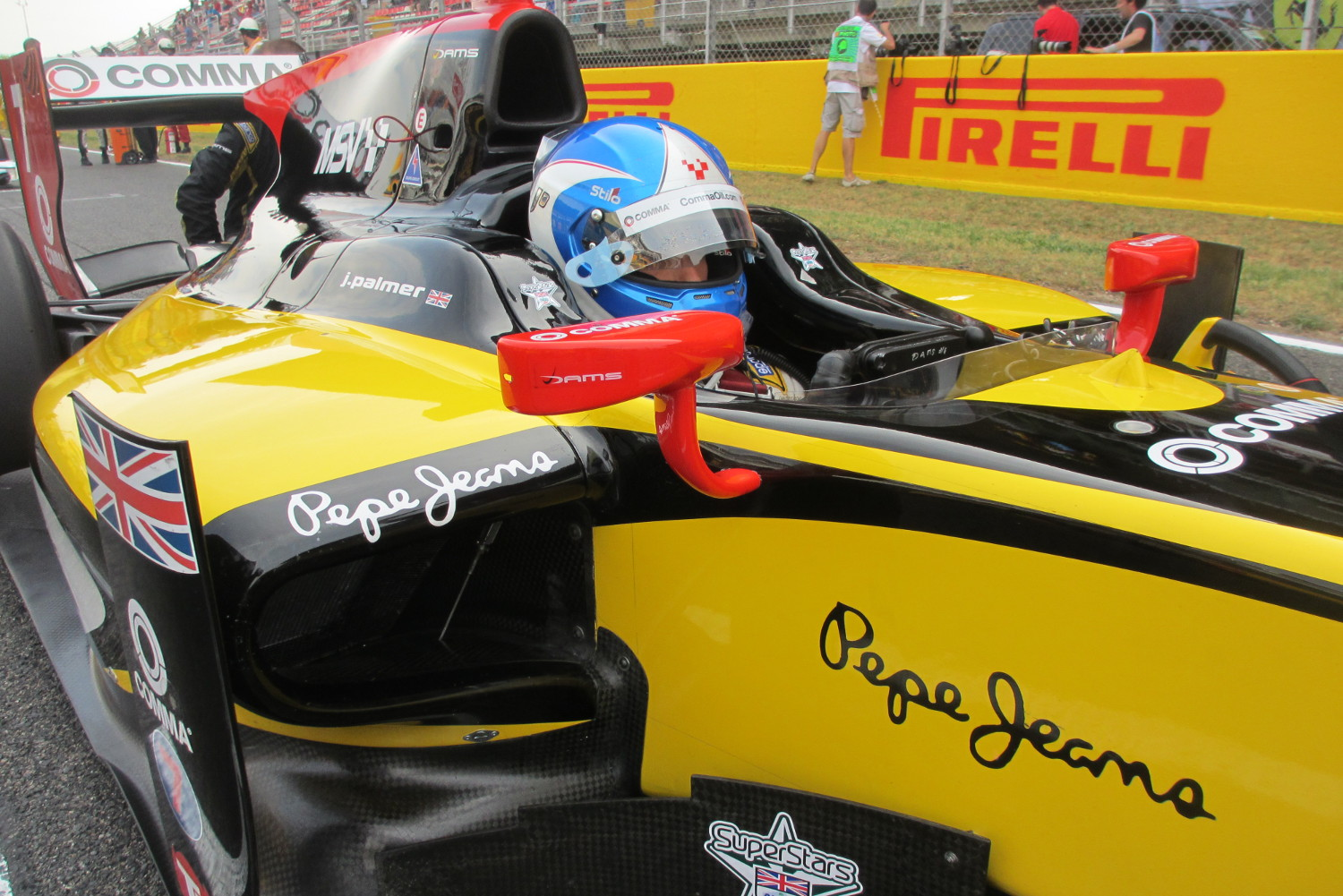
Palmer on the grid in his DAMS car at Barcelona in 2014

For the 2013 GP2 Series, Palmer drove for Carlin, partnering Brazilian 2011 British F3 Champion Felipe Nasr. He scored his first win of the year in the Feature Race at the Hungaroring and took pole, fastest lap and the Feature Race win on the streets of Singapore, ending 13 seconds ahead of team-mate Nasr. Palmer qualified in the top-three in each of the final three events and finished seventh overall in the points table.

==== 2014 season ====
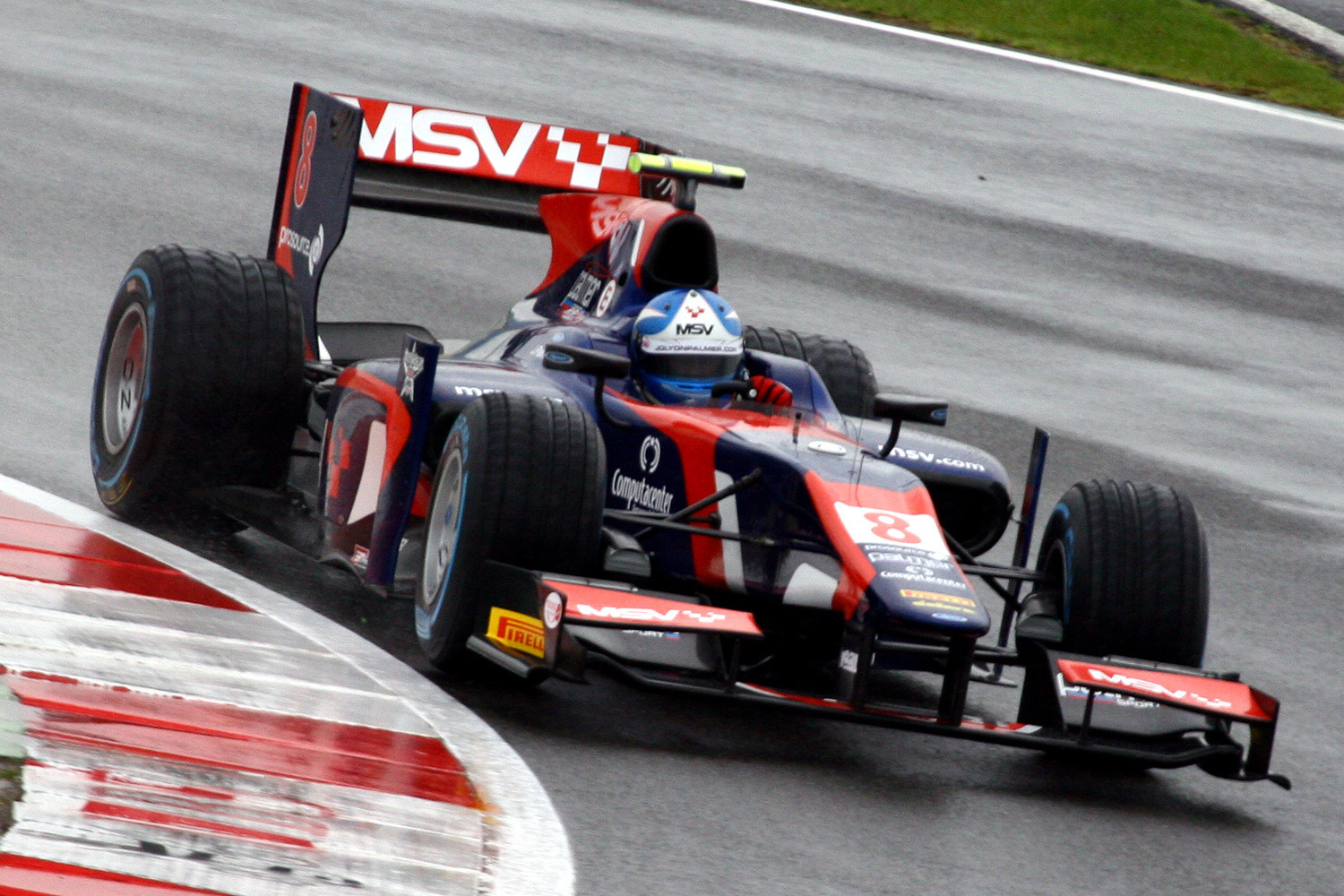
Palmer driving for iSport at the Silverstone round of the 2012

Palmer switched to DAMS for the 2014 GP2 Series and topped the opening day of pre-season testing at Abu Dhabi. He qualified on pole for the first race of the season in Bahrain and finished on the podium. He won the Sprint Race the following day to lead the championship, a lead he held for the rest of the year and added another win in the feature race at Monaco.

At Hungary, Palmer prevailed in wheel-to-wheel contests with Felipe Nasr in both races, and tensions boiled over during the Sprint Race podium ceremony.

At Monza, Palmer was forced to start at the back of the grid for the Feature Race, after his DAMS car was found to have less than the mandatory one litre of fuel remaining, having originally qualified fourth. Despite this, he finished eighth in the Feature Race, securing reverse grid pole for the Sprint Race, which he won to further extend his championship lead.

Palmer clinched the championship at the first possible attempt, with a fourth win of the year at the new Sochi circuit in Russia. He won the title with three races to spare, and achieved an all-time points record in the series.

Speaking just after clinching the title, he said:

It wasn't going to be easy to win the championship this weekend, especially today after missing out on pole yesterday. I can't thank the team enough, they've done an incredible job all year, we've been fighting for pretty much every Feature Race win and every pole with almost no mistakes. It feels amazing to be champion!

The pressure is off us now and we've got another race tomorrow and another round at Abu Dhabi. We can go out now, enjoy it and have some fun!

Looking through the list of previous GP2 Champions, they're all unbelievable drivers, and to be on that list is something which can't be taken away from me, it's an incredible feeling.

On 19 November, it was announced that Palmer would drive for the Sahara Force India F1 team at the Abu Dhabi post-season test on 25 November.

== Formula One ==
=== Force India (2014) ===
Palmer test drove a Force India car at the end of season test at Abu Dhabi's Yas Marina Circuit on 25 November 2014.

=== Lotus (2015) ===
On 20 January 2015, it was announced that Palmer had signed as test and reserve driver for the Lotus F1 Formula One team for 2015, with 2010 GP2 champion Pastor Maldonado and 2011 GP2 champion Romain Grosjean as their official drivers.

Palmer made his debut in the team's 2015 challenger, the E23 Hybrid, on day two of the official pre-season test in Barcelona. Completing 77 laps, he ran a programme focused on data gathering and development work. He finished the day in eighth place. Lotus F1 Team's Trackside Operations Director Alan Permane said: "Today was about data accumulation and Jolyon did a great job in his first time in the car, especially with the particularly cold conditions to start the session in the morning."

Palmer went on to make his Formula One debut on a Grand Prix weekend as he took to the track in Free Practice One at the third round of the 2015 season in China. Palmer completed a packed schedule of aerodynamic and set-up work to finish in 15th place overall on his first visit to the Shanghai circuit.

In his next outing at the Bahrain International Circuit, Palmer ended the session in 14th position, 0.441s shy of teammate Pastor Maldonado. He drove in Free Practice One at the Spanish Grand Prix, recording the 13th fastest time and finishing ahead of Maldonado, before topping the timesheets on the second day of the in-season test in Barcelona on Wednesday 13 May. On 11 June 2015, it was announced that he would drive in Free Practice 1 for the rest of the European season, a total of five Grands Prix, which would take him from Austria to Italy, replacing Frenchman Romain Grosjean.

Palmer continued in FP1 in both Austria and Britain, his home Grand Prix, to finish in 14th position before suffering from limited running in Hungary. Palmer tested a new front-wing for Lotus F1 Team in the next Free Practice One session at Spa-Francorchamps, as Romain Grosjean came home third in the Belgian Grand Prix that weekend. Palmer took part in several further sessions, his final appearance in the Lotus E23 coming at the Abu Dhabi season closer, where technical issues limited him to just 10 minutes' running.

=== Renault (2016–2017) ===
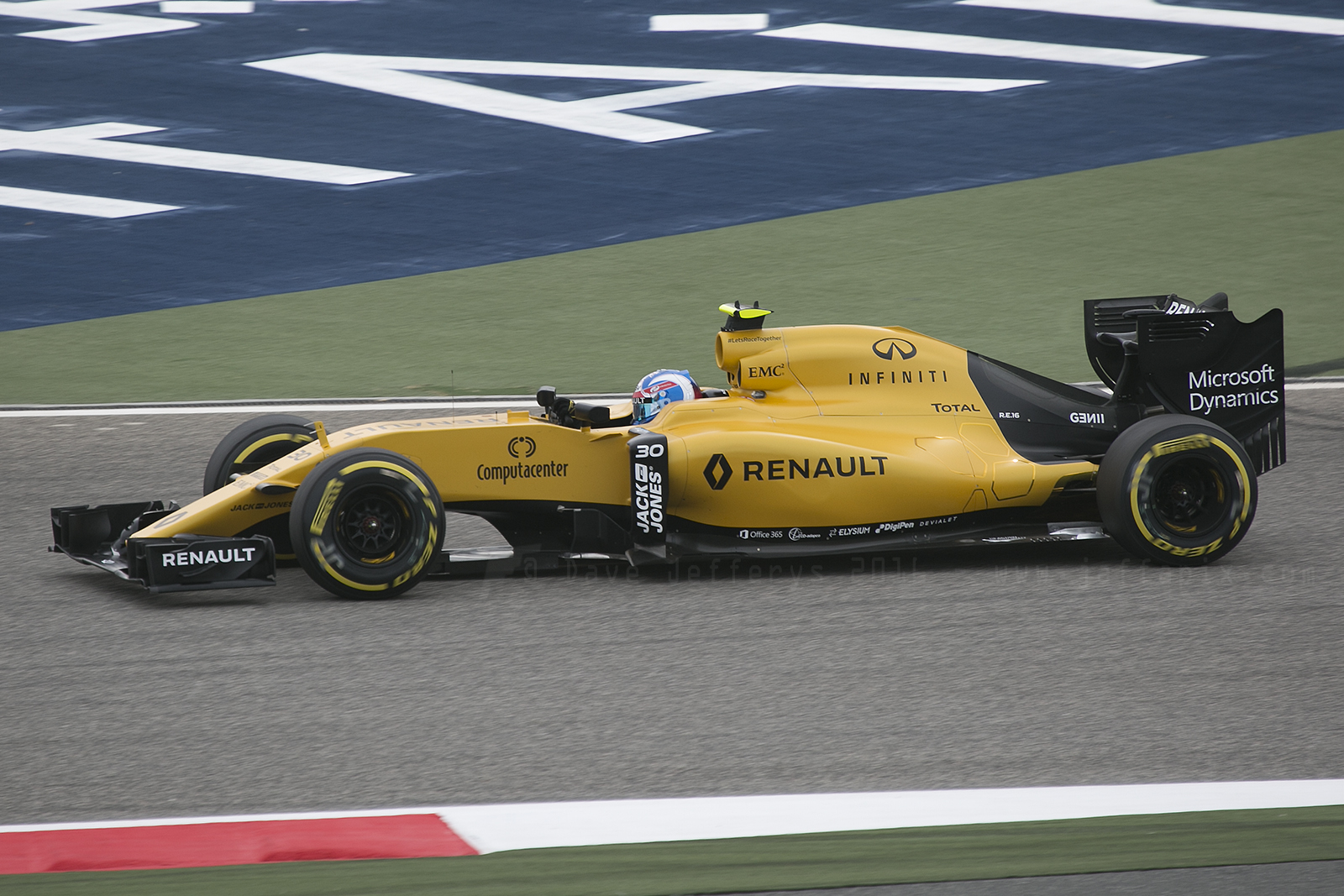
Palmer driving for Renault at the 2016 Bahrain Grand Prix

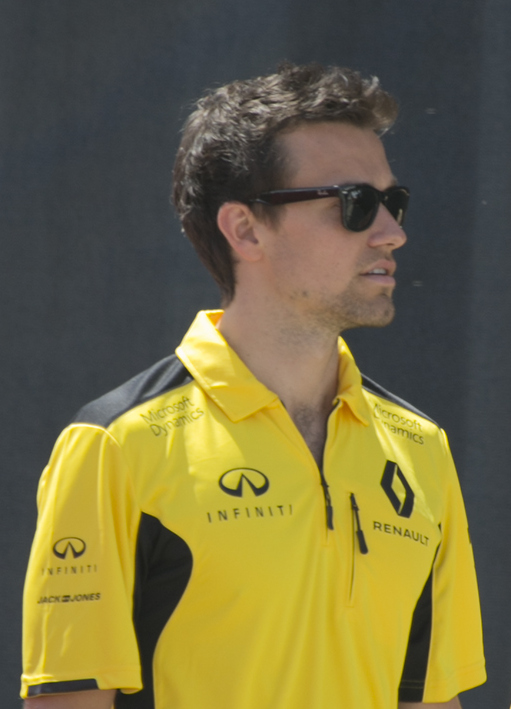
Palmer at the 2016 Bahrain Grand Prix

2016

On 23 October 2015, Palmer confirmed his promotion to a full-time race driver for the Renault Sport F1 Team in 2016, and became the first driver from FIA Formula Two Championship alumni to progress to the Formula One team. He was joined by former McLaren driver Kevin Magnussen for Renault's return to the sport as a constructor, having bought the Lotus F1 Team over the winter. At his debut event in the Australian Grand Prix, Palmer outqualified Magnussen to fourteenth, and after a good start finished the race eleventh ahead of his teammate, just outside the point scoring positions.

A car issue in the next races in Bahrain and China prevented Palmer from showing his true form but he bounced back in the Russian Grand Prix, finishing a strong 13th having started 18th on the grid. He repeated that result in the Spanish Grand Prix, coming home ahead of team-mate Magnussen. After an early exit in Monaco, a water leak put an end to his race in Canada before he finished the European Grand Prix in Baku, Azerbaijan, in a creditable 15th.

Palmer recorded his best result since the season-opening Australian Grand Prix as he came home in 12th in Austria before competing in his maiden home Grand Prix at Silverstone. That ended in disappointment as he suffered a suspected gearbox problem which led to his retirement on lap 38, but he produced a career-best drive next time out in the Hungarian Grand Prix as he narrowly missed out on a maiden points scoring finish in Formula 1, finishing 12th. An opening lap clash ended his German Grand Prix before he led the Renault charge at Spa-Francorchamps in the Belgian Grand Prix, coming home in 15th. Palmer's Italian Grand Prix came to a premature end as he once again led the way for the French manufacturer, as Sauber's Felipe Nasr hit the Brit and eventually forced his retirement from the race on safety grounds.

At the Malaysian Grand Prix, Palmer had his best result to date and claimed his first World Championship point. He finished tenth, 14 seconds behind Jenson Button's McLaren and three seconds ahead of Carlos Sainz in a Toro Rosso. On 9 November 2016, Renault announced that Palmer had extended his deal with them for 2017.

2017

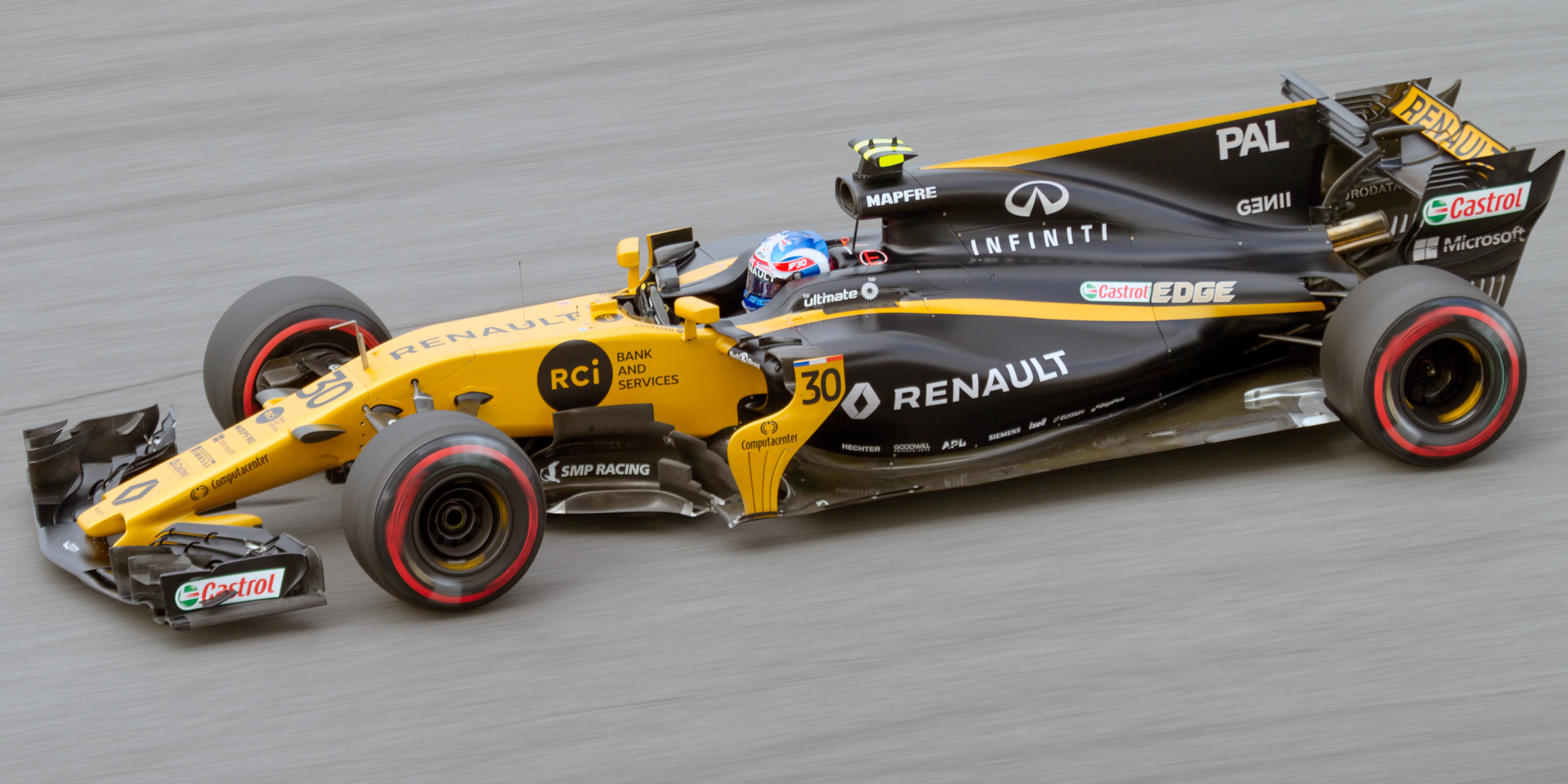
Palmer driving for Renault at the 2017 Malaysian Grand Prix

Magnussen departed Renault at the end of the year for the newly created Haas F1 Team, and Nico Hülkenberg stepped in from Force India to replace him and be Palmer's teammate.

Renault unveiled its brand new R.S.17 at a special launch event in London on 22 January, in a yellow and black livery, adorned with Jolyon's signature race number, 30.

Palmer made his first public appearance behind the wheel of the R.S.17 at the Circuit de Barcelona-Catalunya in Spain in late February, ending the week with the third fastest time on the final day, behind only the Ferrari of Kimi Räikkönen and the Red Bull of Max Verstappen. On the day after he learned that he would be losing his seat for 2018, he survived a race of attrition at the Singapore Grand Prix to gain a career-best finish of sixth, securing his only points of the season.

On 7 October 2017, Renault announced that Palmer would leave the team after the end of the Japanese Grand Prix, to be replaced by Toro Rosso driver Carlos Sainz Jr, taking his seat from the United States Grand Prix onwards. Palmer revealed seven years later that Renault did not tell them their decision before the announcement; he first found out when his brother sent him the news from an Autosport article during the Singapore Grand Prix weekend and had to force a conversation with Renault team boss Cyril Abiteboul to confirm it was true. In that same revelation, Palmer stated he "didn't know" the reasoning for Renault's sudden move.

=== Media career after Formula One (2018) ===
On 22 February 2018, it was announced that Palmer would complete the BBC Radio 5's Formula One staff alongside Jack Nicholls and Jennie Gow, as an expert.

Palmer offers further insight and analysis from the point of view of the competitor with his regular post-Grand Prix column on the BBC website. He is also a Special Contributor to www.formula1.com, analysing racing incidents using all available camera angles. Palmer has appeared as a guest presenter alongside Will Buxton on F1 Live, Liberty Media's post-race paddock show that is available free across the world on social media.

Palmer has also written for Sky Sports F1, with a GP2 Diary posted after each event during his time in the series. He was the regular co-commentator for the GP2 Series on Sky Sports F1 in 2015, and previously commentated alongside future BBC partner Jack Nicholls on the FIA Formula Two Championship.

It was revealed in February 2020 that Palmer would provide expert analysis on the pre-season testing in Barcelona, ahead of the 2020 F1 season.

In 2023, Palmer started working with F1 TV, BBC Sport and Channel 4 as a colour commentator on F1 Live and began hosting his own show on F1 TV named Jolyon Palmer's Analysis, where he reviews each recent Formula One race. As of 2025, Palmer continues to be a commentator on F1 TV's pre-race and post-race show alongside Laura Winter and Lawrence Baretto.

=== Other racing activities ===
Following his GP2 success, Palmer was invited to take part in the 2014 Race of Champions held at the Bushy Park circuit in Barbados. Palmer competed in the Race of Champions Nations Cup event for Team Young Stars, with DTM race-winner Pascal Wehrlein as his team-mate. The pair narrowly missed out on progressing from the group stages, with Palmer losing in close races to Robby Gordon and nine-time Le Mans winner Tom Kristensen but defeating European F3 Champion Esteban Ocon.

In the actual Race of Champions event, Palmer lost to Tom Kristensen, Pascal Wehrlein, and Indianapolis 500 winner Ryan Hunter-Reay.

Palmer returned to compete in the 2015 Race of Champions on home soil at the Olympic Stadium in London as part of the Young Stars pairing, once again racing alongside Pascal Wehrlein. The duo were beaten in the quarter finals by England's touring car drivers Andy Priaulx and Jason Plato, before Palmer was edged out by GT racer Alex Buncombe in the individual competition.

== Awards ==
On 4 December 2014, Palmer was announced as the winner of the Guild of Motoring Writers Driver of the Year Award at a prize gala in London. Each year, the trophy is awarded to the leading driver as chosen by a panel of leading motorsport journalists. Previous winners have included Juan Manuel Fangio, Jim Clark and Michael Schumacher.

Palmer was nominated for the Autosport Awards British Competition Driver of the Year in 2014, losing out to Formula One World Champion Lewis Hamilton.

Palmer collected the British Racing Drivers' Club's Fairfield Trophy in 2014, which is awarded to a BRDC member for outstanding performance throughout the year. The ceremony was attended by Lewis Hamilton, 1996 World Champion Damon Hill and BRDC president Derek Warwick.

== Personal life ==
Palmer is the son of former F1 driver and major UK race circuit owner Jonathan Palmer. His younger brother, Will, won the 2015 British BRDC Formula 4 Championship and the 2015 McLaren Autosport BRDC Award.

Palmer is a supporter of Ipswich Town F.C. and Crystal Palace F.C.

== Racing record ==
=== Career summary ===
Season	Series	Team	Races	Wins	Poles	F/Laps	Podiums	Points	Position
2005	T Cars Autumn Trophy		6	?	?	?	?	92	5th
2006	T Cars	PalmerSport Junior	20	0	1	?	4	92	5th
2006	T Cars Autumn Trophy	PalmerSport Junior	6	4	3	4	5	61	**1st**
2007	Formula Palmer Audi		15	2	2	?	4	187	10th
2007	T Cars	PalmerSport Junior	2	2	1	2	0	24	11th
2008	Formula Palmer Audi		20	1	3	3	11	338	**3rd**
2008	Formula Palmer Audi Autumn Trophy		6	0	0	0	3	89	**3rd**
2008	Formula Palmer Audi Shootout		3	0	0	0	1	36	**3rd**
2009	FIA Formula Two Championship	MotorSport Vision	16	0	0	0	0	3	21st
2009	Formula Palmer Audi	PalmerSport	8	1	3	2	2	70	16th
2010	FIA Formula Two Championship	MotorSport Vision	18	5	5	3	10	242	**2nd**
2011	GP2 Series	Arden International	18	0	0	0	0	0	28th
2011	GP2 Asia Series	Arden International	4	0	0	0	0	0	19th
2011	GP2 Final	Barwa Addax Team	2	0	0	0	1	9	4th
2011	FIA Formula Two Championship	Motorsport Vision	2	0	0	0	0	0	NC
2012	GP2 Series	iSport International	24	1	0	0	3	78	11th
2013	GP2 Series	Carlin	22	2	1	2	3	119	7th
2014	GP2 Series	DAMS	22	4	3	7	12	276	**1st**
2014	Formula One	Sahara Force India F1 Team	Test driver						
2015	Formula One	Lotus F1 Team	Test driver						
2016	Formula One	Renault Sport F1 Team	21	0	0	0	0	1	18th
2017	Formula One	Renault Sport F1 Team	16	0	0	0	0	8	17th

=== Complete Formula Palmer Audi results ===
(key) (Races in bold indicate pole position) (Races in italics indicate fastest lap)

Year	1	2	3	4	5	6	7	8	9	10	11	12	13	14	15	16	17	18	19	20	DC	Points
2007	SIL; 1; 12	SIL; 2; 4	BRH; 1 Ret	BRH; 2; 6	BRH; 3; 2	SNE; 1; 4	SNE; 2; 10	SNE; 3; 10	BRH; 1; 1	BRH; 2; 9	BRH; 3; 4	CAS; 1 Ret	CAS; 2 Ret	OUL; 1; 3	OUL; 2; 1	DON; 1	DON; 2	CRO; 1	CRO; 2	CRO; 3	10th	187
2008	DON; 1; 5	DON; 2; 5	DON; 3; 4	BRH; 1; 4	BRH; 1; 3	SPA; 1; 1	SPA; 2; 2	SPA; 3; 2	OUL; 1; 3	OUL; 2 Ret	**BRH**; **1**; 2	**BRH**; **2**; 2	SNE; 1; 2	SNE; 2; 5	SNE; 3; 3	BRH; 1; 2	BRH; 2; 4	BRH; 3; 7	SIL; 1; 3	SIL; 2; 4	3rd	338
2009	BRH; 1	BRH; 2	BRH; 3	SIL; 1; 10	SIL; 2 Ret	SIL; 3 DNS	SNE; 1	SNE; 2	OUL; 1	OUL; 2	OUL; 3	BRH; 1	BRH; 2	BRH; 3	**SIL**; **1**; 1	**SIL**; **2**; 18	**SIL**; **3**; 18	SNE; 1; 6	SNE; 2; 3	SNE; 3 Ret	16th	70

=== Complete FIA Formula Two Championship results ===
(key) (Races in bold indicate pole position) (Races in italics indicate fastest lap)

Year	1	2	3	4	5	6	7	8	9	10	11	12	13	14	15	16	17	18	DC	Points
2009	VAL; 1; 21	VAL; 2 Ret	BRN; 1; 10	BRN; 2; 14	SPA; 1; 16	SPA; 2 Ret	BRH; 1; 12	BRH; 2; 16	DON; 1; 16	DON; 2; 12	OSC; 1; 15	OSC; 2; 19	IMO; 1; 12	IMO; 2; 6	CAT; 1; 13	CAT; 2; 11			21st	3
2010	**SIL**; **1**; 1	SIL; 2; 2	MAR; 1 Ret	MAR; 2; 5	**MNZ**; **1**; 1	**MNZ**; **2**; 1	ZOL; 1; 2	ZOL; 2; 2	**ALG**; **1**; 1	**ALG**; **2**; 2	BRH; 1; 8	BRH; 2 Ret	BRN; 1; 5	BRN; 2; 1	OSC; 1; 3	OSC; 2; 12	VAL; 1; 7	VAL; 2; 13	**2nd**	**242**
2011	SIL; 1	SIL; 2	MAG; 1	MAG; 2	SPA; 1	SPA; 2	NÜR; 1 DNS	NÜR; 2 DNS	BRH; 1	BRH; 2	SPL; 1	SPL; 2	MNZ; 1	MNZ; 2	CAT; 1	CAT; 2			NC	0

=== Complete GP2 Series results ===
(key) (Races in bold indicate pole position) (Races in italics indicate fastest lap)

Year	Entrant	1	2	3	4	5	6	7	8	9	10	11	12	13	14	15	16	17	18	19	20	21	22	23	24	DC	Points
2011	Arden International	IST; FEA; 17	IST; SPR; 9	CAT; FEA; 18	CAT; SPR; 17	MON; FEA; NC	MON; SPR; 11	VAL; FEA; 9	VAL; SPR; Ret	SIL; FEA; 20	SIL; SPR; 16	NÜR; FEA; 19	NÜR; SPR; Ret	HUN; FEA; 22	HUN; SPR; 18	SPA; FEA; Ret	SPA; SPR; 14	MNZ; FEA; Ret	MNZ; SPR; 19							28th	0
2012	iSport International	SEP; FEA; 17	SEP; SPR; 12	BHR1; FEA; DNS	BHR1; SPR; 7	BHR2; FEA; 24	BHR2; SPR; 22	CAT; FEA; 9	CAT; SPR; DNS	MON; FEA; 6	MON; SPR; 1	VAL; FEA; Ret	VAL; SPR; Ret	SIL; FEA; 3	SIL; SPR; 5	HOC; FEA; 18	HOC; SPR; 18	HUN; FEA; 6	HUN; SPR; 5	SPA; FEA; Ret	SPA; SPR; 10	MNZ; FEA; 7	MNZ; SPR; 3	MRN; FEA; Ret	MRN; SPR; Ret	11th	78
2013	Carlin	SEP; FEA; 6	SEP; SPR; 9	BHR; FEA; 5	BHR; SPR; 6	CAT; FEA; 10	CAT; SPR; 4	MON; FEA; Ret	MON; SPR; 12	SIL; FEA; 6	SIL; SPR; Ret	NÜR; FEA; 24	NÜR; SPR; 11	HUN; FEA; 1	HUN; SPR; 12	SPA; FEA; 15	SPA; SPR; 6	MNZ; FEA; Ret	MNZ; SPR; 10	**MRN**; **FEA**; 1	MRN; SPR; 17	YMC; FEA; 2	YMC; SPR; Ret			7th	119
2014	DAMS	**BHR**; **FEA**; 3	BHR; SPR; 1	CAT; FEA; 2	CAT; SPR; 2	**MON**; **FEA**; 1	MON; SPR; 7	RBR; FEA; 5	RBR; SPR; 6	SIL; FEA; 2	SIL; SPR; 4	**HOC**; **FEA**; 3	HOC; SPR; 6	HUN; FEA; 4	HUN; SPR; 2	SPA; FEA; 6	SPA; SPR; 3	MNZ; FEA; 8	MNZ; SPR; 1	SOC; FEA; 1	SOC; SPR; 10	YMC; FEA; 2	YMC; SPR; Ret			**1st**	**276**

==== Complete GP2 Asia Series results ====
(key) (Races in bold indicate pole position) (Races in italics indicate fastest lap)

Year	Entrant	1	2	3	4	DC	Points
2011	Arden International	YMC; FEA; 14	YMC; SPR; 10	IMO; FEA; 19	IMO; SPR; Ret	19th	0

==== Complete GP2 Final results ====
(key) (Races in bold indicate pole position) (Races in italics indicate fastest lap)

Year	Entrant	1	2	DC	Points
2011	Barwa Addax Team	YMC; FEA; 3	YMC; SPR; 4	4th	9

=== Complete Formula One results ===
(key) (Races in bold indicate pole position; races in italics indicate fastest lap)

Year	Entrant	Chassis	Engine	1	2	3	4	5	6	7	8	9	10	11	12	13	14	15	16	17	18	19	20	21	WDC	Points
2015	Lotus F1 Team	Lotus E23 Hybrid	Mercedes PU106B Hybrid 1.6 V6 t	AUS	MAL	CHN; TD	BHR; TD	ESP; TD	MON	CAN	AUT; TD	GBR; TD	HUN; TD	BEL; TD	ITA; TD	SIN	JPN; TD	RUS; TD	USA; TD^{1}	MEX; TD	BRA; TD	ABU; TD			–	–
2016	Renault Sport F1 Team	Renault R.S.16	Renault R.E.16 1.6 V6 t	AUS; 11	BHR; DNS	CHN; 22	RUS; 13	ESP; 13	MON; Ret	CAN; Ret	EUR; 15	AUT; 12	GBR; Ret	HUN; 12	GER; 19	BEL; 15	ITA; Ret	SIN; 15	MAL; 10	JPN; 12	USA; 13	MEX; 14	BRA; Ret	ABU; 17	18th	1
2017	Renault Sport F1 Team	Renault R.S.17	Renault R.E.17 1.6 V6 t	AUS; Ret	CHN; 13	BHR; 13	RUS; Ret	ESP; 15	MON; 11	CAN; 11	AZE; Ret	AUT; 11	GBR; DNS	HUN; 12	BEL; 13	ITA; Ret	SIN; 6	MAL; 15	JPN; 12	USA	MEX	BRA	ABU		17th	8

^1 – Was entered as third driver, but did not run due to bad weather.

Sporting positions
Preceded by Fabio Leimer	GP2 Series; Champion; 2014	Succeeded by Stoffel Vandoorne
