= Johannes Theobald =

German racing driver

- Nationality: (Germany) German
- Born: Johannes Marius Theobald; 22 February 1987 (age 39) Stuttgart, West Germany
- Relatives: Julian Theobald (brother)

FIA Formula Two Championship career
- Debut season: 2010
- Current team: MotorSport Vision
- Car number: 22
- Starts: 10
- Wins: 0
- Poles: 0
- Fastest laps: 0

Previous series
- 2007 2005–07 2003–04: Formula Renault 3.5 Series; German Formula Three; Formula König

Johannes Marius Theobald (born 22 February 1987 in Stuttgart) is a German former racing driver.

== Career ==
=== Formula König ===
After spending his early years karting in his native Germany, Theobald made his Formula Racing debut in the entry–level Formula König series in 2003, finishing the year in 12th position. The following season, he scored nine podium places to be classified as runner–up behind Ronny Wechselberger, who won all 14 races in the championship.

=== Formula Three ===
In 2005, Theobald graduated to the German Formula Three Championship, racing in the same SMS Seyffarth Junior Team as his brother Julian. After failing to start either race at the fourth round at the Lausitzring, he switched from a Renault to a Mercedes–powered Dallara F304 for the remaining races. He scored three points to finish the season in 17th place.

Theobald remained in the series for 2006, but due to budget constraints he competed in the secondary Trophy Class for older specification Dallara chassis. Despite again missing a round of the championship at the Lausitzring, he accumulated three class wins and a further eleven podium places to finish as runner–up behind Latvian Harald Schlegelmilch. In the overall standings, he finished tied on points with Natacha Gachnang and was classified in 14th place on countback.

In 2007, Theobald originally started the season without a drive, but joined Christian Vietoris at Josef Kaufmann Racing for a one-off round at the Nürburgring, finishing the two races in ninth and 11th places respectively.

=== Formula Renault 3.5 Series ===
In October 2007, Theobald replaced Alessandro Ciompi at Eurointernational for the penultimate round of the Formula Renault 3.5 Series season in Estoril, lining up alongside his brother Julian in the team. He finished the two races in 25th and 19th places respectively.

=== Formula Two ===
In July 2010, Theobald and his brother both took part in the FIA Formula Two Championship pre-event test at Brands Hatch. Whilst Julian took part in the Brands Hatch meeting, Johannes was unable to compete due to him undergoing his final university exams back in Germany. However, in September 2010, he did make his debut in the series, racing in the penultimate round of the season at Oschersleben.

At the start of 2011, Theobald signed up with his brother to compete in a full season of the series.

== Racing record ==
=== Career summary ===
Season	Series	Team	Races	Wins	Poles	F/Laps	Podiums	Points	Position
2003	Formula König	?	14	0	0	0	0	118	12th
2004	Formula König	Böhm Motorsport	14	0	0	?	9	191	**2nd**
2005	German Formula Three Championship	SMS Seyffarth Junior Team	14	0	0	0	0	3	17th
2006	German Formula Three Championship - Trophy	SMS Seyffarth Motorsport	18	3	3	1	14	126	**2nd**
2006	German Formula Three Championship	SMS Seyffarth Motorsport	18	0	0	0	0	11	14th
2007	German Formula Three Championship	Josef Kaufmann Racing	2	0	0	0	0	0	NC
2007	Formula Renault 3.5 Series	Eurointernational	2	0	0	0	0	0	37th
2010	FIA Formula Two Championship	MotorSport Vision	4	0	0	0	0	0	NC
2011	FIA Formula Two Championship	MotorSport Vision	10	0	0	0	0	1	21st

=== Complete FIA Formula Two Championship results ===
(key) (Races in bold indicate pole position; Races in italics indicate fastest lap)

Year	1	2	3	4	5	6	7	8	9	10	11	12	13	14	15	16	17	18	Pos	Points
2010	SIL; 1	SIL; 2	MAR; 1	MAR; 2	MON; 1	MON; 2	ZOL; 1	ZOL; 2	ALG; 1	ALG; 2	BRH; 1	BRH; 2	BRN; 1	BRN; 2	OSC; 1; 16	OSC; 2; 13	VAL; 1; 11	VAL; 2; 12	25th	0
2011	SIL; 1 Ret	SIL; 2; 16	MAG; 1; 14	MAG; 2; 11	SPA; 1; 12	SPA; 2 Ret	NÜR; 1; 10	NÜR; 2 Ret	BRH; 1	BRH; 2	RBR; 1 Ret	RBR; 2; 16	MON; 1	MON; 2	CAT; 1	CAT; 2			21st	1
