= Dean Stoneman =

British racing driver (born 1990)

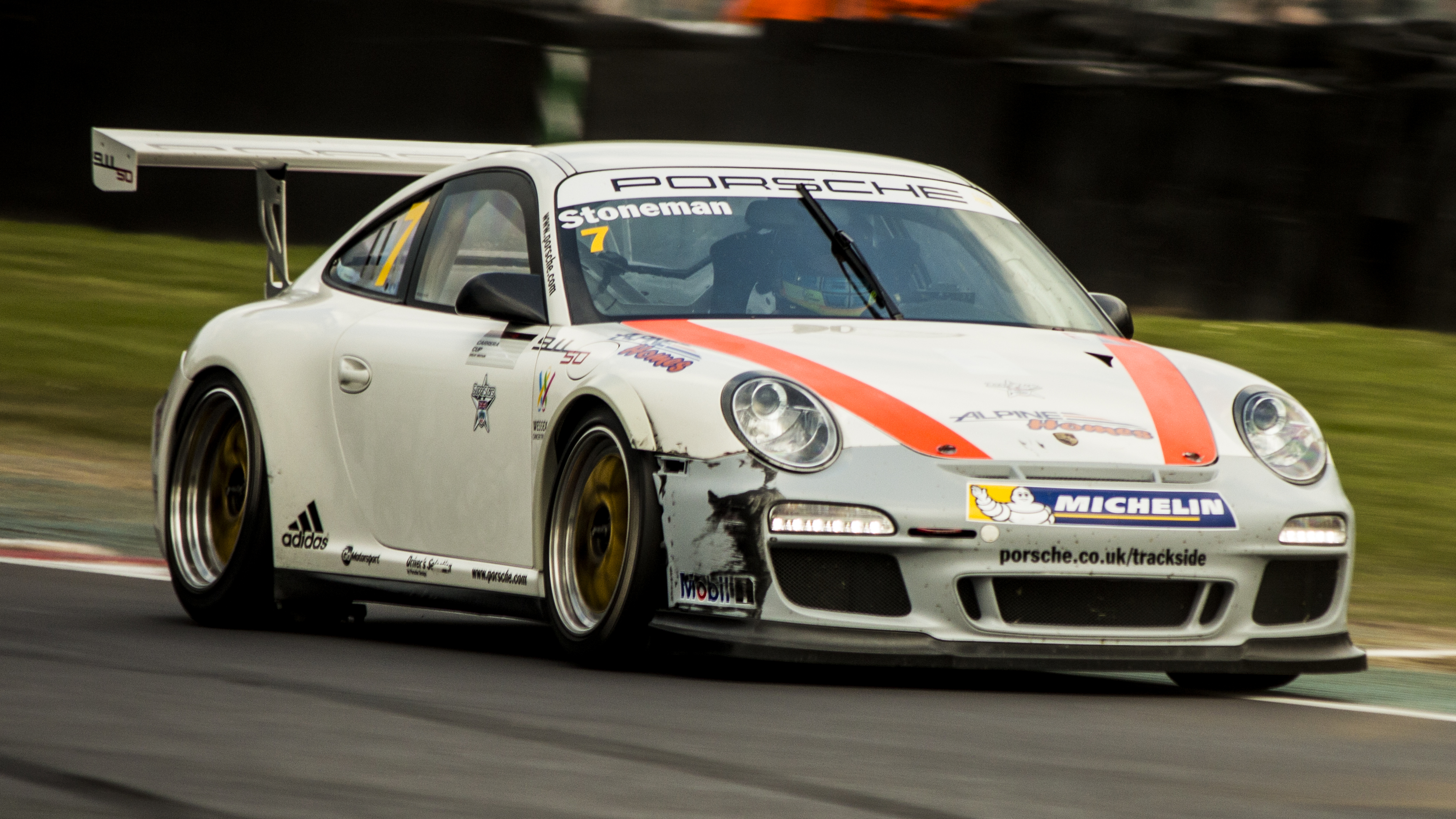
- Stoneman racing in the Porsche Carrera Cup Great Britain at Oulton Park in 2013
- Nationality: (United Kingdom) British
- Born: Dean Colin Stoneman; 24 July 1990 (age 36) Croydon, London, England

Indy Lights career
- Debut season: 2016
- Current team: Andretti Autosport
- Categorisation: FIA Gold (until 2025); FIA Silver (2026–)
- Car number: 27
- Starts: 18
- Wins: 2
- Poles: 0
- Fastest laps: 2
- Best finish: 5th in 2016

Previous series
- 2015 2013–2014 2010 2010 2008–09 2006–08 2006–07: GP2 Series; GP3 Series; Formula Renault 3.5 Series; FIA Formula Two; Formula Renault 2.0 UK; FR2.0 UK Winter Series; Formula Renault BARC

Championship titles
- 2020 2010 2008: Lamborghini Super Trofeo Europe; FIA Formula Two; FR2.0 UK Graduate Cup

Dean Colin Stoneman (born 24 July 1990) is a British racing driver. Stoneman was the 2010 Formula Two champion.

== Career ==
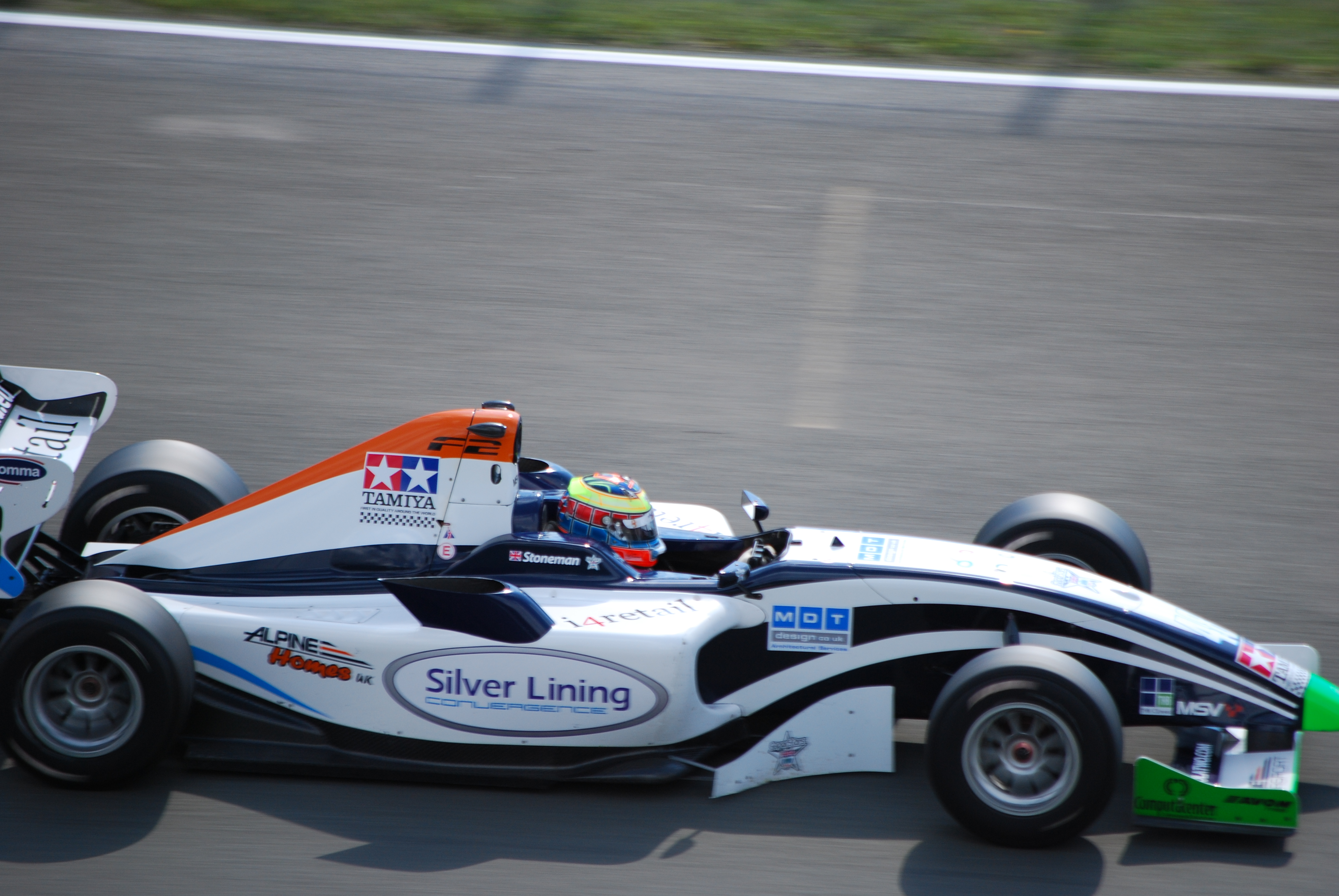
With six victories, Stoneman won the 2010 FIA Formula Two Championship by 42 points from nearest rival Jolyon Palmer.

Like many drivers, Stoneman began his career in karting. He made his first steps in single-seaters in 2006 when he competed in selected rounds of the Formula Renault BARC. He raced in the series full-time in 2007, finishing as runner-up to Hywel Lloyd. He also finished sixth in the Formula Renault 2.0 UK Winter Series.

Stoneman moved to the main Formula Renault 2.0 UK championship in 2008 and took three wins on his way to fourth in the standings. He was also nominated for the McLaren Autosport BRDC Award. Stoneman finished fourth again in the standings in 2009, this time with just one race win.

Stoneman won the FIA Formula Two Championship in 2010, securing a test drive with the Williams F1 team at the end of the season. On the first day of the young drivers test in Abu Dhabi he set the fifth fastest time, just under two seconds slower than pacesetter Daniel Ricciardo.

In 2011, Stoneman had been planning to progress to the Formula Renault 3.5 series, joining fellow young driver tester Ricciardo at ISR Racing, but he was forced to skip the season after he was diagnosed with testicular cancer.

Stoneman spent 2012 competing in powerboat racing (his father, Colin, was a previous champion) as he regained fitness, winning the P1 SuperStock UK powerboat title in 2012. He returned to car racing in the 2013 Porsche Carrera Cup Great Britain season after recovering from his illness, winning both races on his debut weekend along with pole position in qualifying. Later in the season, Stoneman had accumulated too many points on his licence and was given a two race ban, which he served at the Rockingham race weekend.

Stoneman returned to single-seater racing in late 2013 driving for Koiranen GP in the last two races of the 2013 GP3 Series season. Stoneman signed with Marussia Manor Racing for 2014 GP3 season. Stoneman drove for Manor in the first seven race weekends. Following Manor's folding four races before season's ending, Stoneman switched to Koiranen GP replacing Carmen Jordá. Stoneman finished second in the drivers championship.

In 2015, Stoneman moved to the Formula Renault 3.5 Series with DAMS having picked up the backing of the Red Bull Junior Team. Stoneman finished sixth overall in the Formula Renault 3.5 scoring 130 points. Stoneman joined GP2 series with Carlin for the last three events of the 2015 season. Stoneman finished GP2 season 24th overall with one point.

In 2016, Stoneman moved to Indy Lights driving for Andretti Autosport. He finished fifth in the Indy Lights championship. In addition to competing in Indy Lights, Stoneman tested an Andretti Dallara IR12 Indycar in August of that year.

In March 2017, Strakka Racing announced that Stoneman would race for them in 2017, sharing a McLaren 650 GT3 with Andrew Watson and Jazeman Jaafar in the 2017 Blancpain GT Series Endurance Cup.

== Personal life ==
Stoneman went to school at Wyvern College, Eastleigh.

== Racing record ==
=== Career summary ===
Season	Series	Team	Races	Wins	Poles	F/Laps	Podiums	Points	Position
2006	Formula Renault BARC	Alpine Motorsport	3	0	0	0	0	0	26th
2006	Formula Renault UK Winter Cup	Alpine Motorsport	4	0	0	0	0	19	19th
2007	Formula Renault BARC	Alpine Motorsport	12	3	3	2	9	131	**2nd**
2007	Formula Renault UK Winter Cup	Alpine Motorsport	4	0	0	0	2	74	6th
2008	Formula Renault UK	Alpine Motorsport	20	3	3	1	9	398	4th
2008	Formula Renault UK Winter Cup	Alpine Motorsport	4	1	0	0	2	73	**3rd**
2008	Formula Renault UK Graduate Cup	Alpine Motorsport	1	1	1	1	1	n/a	**1st**
2009	Formula Renault UK	Alpine Motorsport	20	1	1	0	8	418	4th
2010	FIA Formula Two Championship	Silver Lining	18	6	6	4	13	284	**1st**
2010	Formula Renault 3.5 Series	Junior Lotus Racing	2	0	0	0	0	0	26th
2013	Porsche Carrera Cup GB	Redline Racing	18	5	2	4	10	231	5th
2013	GP3 Series	Koiranen GP	2	0	0	0	1	20	16th
2014	GP3 Series	Marussia Manor Racing	14	3	0	1	3	163	**2nd**
2014	GP3 Series	Koiranen GP	4	2	1	1	3	163	**2nd**
2015	Formula Renault 3.5 Series	DAMS	17	0	0	0	4	130	6th
2015	GP2 Series	Carlin	6	0	0	0	0	1	24th
2016	Indy Lights	Andretti Autosport	18	2	0	2	7	316	5th
2016–17	Formula E	NEXTEV NIO	Test driver						
2017	Blancpain GT Series Endurance Cup	Strakka Racing	3	0	0	0	0	0	NC
2018–19	FIA World Endurance Championship	CEFC TRSM Racing	0	0	0	0	0	0	NC
2019	Blancpain GT Series Endurance Cup	Ombra Racing	4	0	0	0	0	0	NC
2019	Blancpain GT Series Endurance Cup - Silver	Ombra Racing	4	0	0	0	0	20	18th
2020	Lamborghini Super Trofeo Europe	Bonaldi Motorsport	10	4	3	3	6	100.5	**1st**

=== Complete FIA Formula Two Championship results ===
(key) (Races in bold indicate pole position) (Races in italics indicate fastest lap)

Year	1	2	3	4	5	6	7	8	9	10	11	12	13	14	15	16	17	18	DC	Points
2010	SIL; 1; 2	SIL; 2 Ret	**MAR**; **1**; 1	MAR; 2; 2	MNZ; 1; 2	MNZ; 2; 4	**ZOL**; **1**; 1	ZOL; 2; 3	ALG; 1; 11	ALG; 2; 1	**BRH**; **1**; 1	BRH; 2; 12	**BRN**; **1**; 2	**BRN**; **2**; 2	OSC; 1; 1	**OSC**; **2**; 1	VAL; 1; 9	VAL; 2; 3	**1st**	**284**

=== Complete Formula Renault 3.5 Series results ===
(key) (Races in bold indicate pole position) (Races in italics indicate fastest lap)

Year	Team	1	2	3	4	5	6	7	8	9	10	11	12	13	14	15	16	17	Pos	Points
2010	Junior Lotus Racing	ALC; 1	ALC; 2	SPA; 1	SPA; 2	MON; 1	BRN; 1	BRN; 2	MAG; 1	MAG; 2	HUN; 1	HUN; 2	HOC; 1	HOC; 2	SIL; 1	SIL; 2	CAT; 1; 18	CAT; 2; 14	26th	0
2015	DAMS	ALC; 1; 3	ALC; 2; 12	MON; 1; 2	SPA; 1; 3	SPA; 2; 4	HUN; 1; 6	HUN; 2; 12	RBR; 1; 2	RBR; 2 Ret	SIL; 1 Ret	SIL; 2; 4	NÜR; 1 Ret	NÜR; 2; 6	BUG; 1; 4	BUG; 2; 4	JER; 1; 13	JER; 2 Ret	6th	130

=== Complete GP3 Series results ===
(key) (Races in bold indicate pole position) (Races in italics indicate fastest lap)

Year	Entrant	1	2	3	4	5	6	7	8	9	10	11	12	13	14	15	16	17	18	D.C.	Points
2013	Koiranen GP	CAT; FEA	CAT; SPR	VAL; FEA	VAL; SPR	SIL; FEA	SIL; SPR	NÜR; FEA	NÜR; SPR	HUN; FEA	HUN; SPR	SPA; FEA	SPA; SPR	MNZ; FEA	MNZ; SPR	YMC; FEA; 6	YMC; SPR; 2			16th	20
2014	Marussia Manor Racing	CAT; FEA; 7	CAT; SPR; 1	RBR; FEA; Ret	RBR; SPR; 10	SIL; FEA; 10	SIL; SPR; 18†	HOC; FEA; 5	HOC; SPR; 4	HUN; FEA; 9	HUN; SPR; 8	SPA; FEA; 1	SPA; SPR; 9	MNZ; FEA; 5	MNZ; SPR; 1					**2nd**	**163**
2014	Koiranen GP															**SOC**; **FEA**; 1	SOC; SPR; 2	YMC; FEA; 1	YMC; SPR; Ret	**2nd**	**163**

^{†} Driver did not finish the race, but was classified as he completed over 90% of the race distance.

=== Complete GP2 Series results ===
(key) (Races in bold indicate pole position) (Races in italics indicate fastest lap)

Year	Entrant	1	2	3	4	5	6	7	8	9	10	11	12	13	14	15	16	17	18	19	20	21	22	DC	Points
2015	Carlin	BHR; FEA	BHR; SPR	CAT; FEA	CAT; SPR	MON; FEA	MON; SPR	RBR; FEA	RBR; SPR	SIL; FEA	SIL; SPR	HUN; FEA	HUN; SPR	SPA; FEA	SPA; SPR	MNZ; FEA	MNZ; SPR	SOC; FEA; 9	SOC; SPR; 16	BHR; FEA; 21	BHR; SPR; 12	YMC; FEA; Ret	YMC; SPR; C	24th	1

=== American open-wheel racing results ===
==== Indy Lights ====
Year	Team	1	2	3	4	5	6	7	8	9	10	11	12	13	14	15	16	17	18	Rank	Points	Ref
2016	Andretti Autosport	STP; 8	STP; 6	PHX; 5	ALA; 16	ALA; 3	IMS; 3	IMS; 1	INDY; 1	RDA; 2	RDA; 9	IOW; 4	TOR; 5	TOR; 14	MOH; 3	MOH; 2	WGL; 10	LAG; 13	LAG; 9	5th	316	

=== Complete FIA World Endurance Championship results ===
(key) (Races in bold indicate pole position; races in italics indicate fastest lap)

Year	Entrant	Class	Chassis	Engine	1	2	3	4	5	6	7	8	Rank	Points
2018–19	CEFC TRSM Racing	LMP1	Ginetta G60-LT-P1	Mecachrome V634P1 3.4 L Turbo V6	SPA; WD	LMS	SIL	FUJ	SHA	SEB	SPA	LMS	NC	0

Sporting positions
Preceded by Andy Soucek	FIA Formula Two Championship; Champion; 2010	Succeeded by Mirko Bortolotti
Preceded by Sergei Afanasiev; Danny Kroes	Lamborghini Super Trofeo Europe; Champion; 2020	Succeeded by Leonardo Pulcini; Kevin Gilardoni
