= Harald Schlegelmilch =

Latvian racing driver

Haralds Šlēgelmilhs
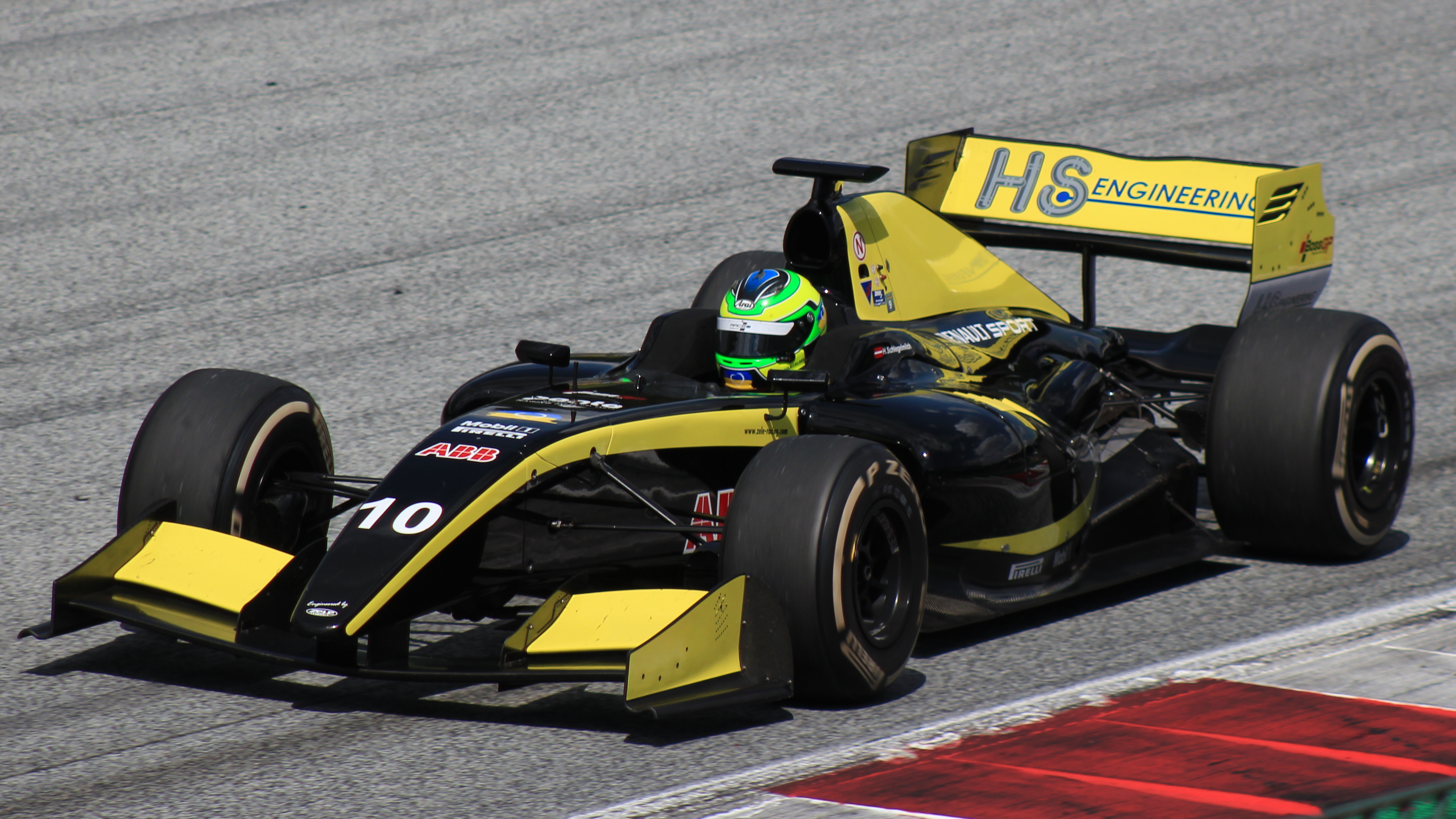
- Schlegelmilch driving the Dallara T12 at the BOSS GP Series 2022 race
- Nationality: (Latvia) Latvian
- Born: Haralds Šlēgelmilhs; 6 December 1987 (age 38) Riga, Latvian SSR, Soviet Union
- Categorisation: FIA Gold

Previous series
- 2012 2010 2008–09 2009 2009 2008 2007 2005–06 2005–06 2005 2004 2004 2003: FIA Formula Two Championship; Porsche Carrera Cup Germany; International Formula Master; Formula Renault 3.5 Series; Atlantic Championship; GP2 Asia Series; Formula 3 Euro Series; Austrian F3; German F3; Formula BMW ADAC; FR2000 Scandinavia; Formula Lista Junior; Formula Baltic

Championship titles
- 2006 2006 2004: Austrian F3; Recaro Formel 3 Trophy; Formula Lista Junior

Haralds Šlēgelmilhs (born 6 December 1987), known internationally as Harald Schlegelmilch, is a Latvian racing driver.

== Career ==
Schlegelmilch started racing at the age of eight. He raced in karting championships for seven years. In 2003, he participated in Formula BMW testing and in 2004 he drove in the Austrian-Swiss Formula BMW championship. Simultaneously, he was a driver in Formula Renault 2000 Scandinavia. The results were high, as the young driver became the Austrian-Swiss champion and was the best Rookie of F-Renault 2000. He continued with German Formula BMW in 2005. Schlegelmilch was good enough to promote in German Formula Three, scoring a few wins. His team, HS Technik decided to go to Formula Three Euroseries taking Harald with them. They started testing very late, so results of the first races were poor. But as time wore on, Schlegalmilch was showing better and better pace each race, until he won a race.

In October 2007, Schlegelmilch tested a Trident GP2 car. It was announced at December 2 that he would drive in International Formula Master with Trident in 2008. He was linked to possible GP2 or World Series by Renault drives in 2009, and drove for Comtec Racing in place of Alexandre Marsoin at the opening rounds in Montmeló. Marsoin returned for round two however, leaving Schlegelmilch without a drive. He also drove in the GP2 Asia Series in 2008.

== Racing record ==
=== Career summary ===
Season	Series	Team	Races	Wins	Poles	F/Laps	Podiums	Points	Position
2003	Formula Baltic		12	0	0	0	1	46	6th
2004	Formula Lista Junior		14	8	6	7	10	215	**1st**
2004	Formula Renault 2.0 Scandinavia	Racing Denmark	23	0	0	1	3	149	5th
2005	Formula BMW ADAC	AM-Holzer Rennsport	16	0	0	0	0	1	25th
2005	Formula BMW World Final	AM-Holzer Rennsport	1	0	0	0	0	N/A	17th
2005	Austria Formula 3 Cup	HS Technik Motorsport	4	1	0	1	4	59	**3rd**
2005	Recaro Formel 3 Cup	HS Technik Motorsport	4	0	0	0	0	0	NC†
2006	Recaro Formel 3 Trophy	HS Technik Motorsport	18	14	13	14	15	152	**1st**
2006	Austria Formula 3 Cup	HS Technik Motorsport	6	5	5	6	6	115	**1st**
2006	Recaro Formel 3 Cup	HS Technik Motorsport	2	0	0	0	0	91	**3rd**
2007	Formula 3 Euro Series	HS Technik Motorsport	20	1	0	0	1	9	14th
2007	Masters of Formula 3	HS Technik Motorsport	1	0	0	0	0	N/A	8th
2008	International Formula Master	Trident Racing	16	1	0	1	2	46	4th
2008	GP2 Asia Series	Trident Racing	10	0	0	0	0	3	18th
2009	German Formula Three	HS Technik Motorsport	8	0	0	0	2	30	9th
2009	International Formula Master	Cram Competition	4	0	0	0	0	3	16th
2009	Formula Renault 3.5 Series	Comtec Racing	2	0	0	0	0	0	37th
2009	Atlantic Championship	Conquest Racing	1	0	0	0	0	12	13th
2010	Porsche Carrera Cup Germany	Konrad Motorsport	6	0	0	0	0	23	17th
2012	FIA Formula Two Championship	MotorSport Vision	2	0	0	0	0	12	13th
2014	ADAC GT Masters	BKK Mobil Oil Racing Team Zakspeed	2	0	0	0	1	20	31st
2015	FIA Formula 3 European Championship	Artline Engineering	6	0	0	0	0	0	NC†
2015	Lamborghini Super Trofeo Europe - Pro-Am	Artline Team Georgia	11	1	1	2	4	68	7th
2016	Lamborghini Super Trofeo Europe - Pro	Artline Team Georgia	12	2	3	0	9	116	**2nd**
2016	Lamborghini Super Trofeo World Final - Pro	Artline Team Georgia	2	0	0	1	0	16	**3rd**
2017	Lamborghini Super Trofeo Europe - Pro	Artline Team Georgia	2	0	0	0	0	13	9th
2019	Lamborghini Super Trofeo Europe - Pro-Am	Artline Team Georgia	10	5	3	5	10	138	**2nd**
2019	Lamborghini Super Trofeo Middle-East - Pro-Am	Artline Team Georgia	6	0	4	0	4	?	?
2019	Lamborghini Super Trofeo World Final - Pro-Am	Artline Team Georgia	2	0	0	0	0	8	6th
2021	Boss GP Series - Formula Class	HS Engineering	2	1	1	1	2	47	6th
2022	Boss GP Series - Open Class	HS Engineering	10	10	5	10	10	250	**1st**
2023	Boss GP Series - Formula Class	HS Engineering	2	1	0	1	2	49	10th

† - As Schlegelmilch was a guest driver, he was ineligible to score points.

=== Complete GP2 Series results ===
==== Complete GP2 Asia Series results ====
(key) (Races in bold indicate pole position) (Races in italics indicate fastest lap)

Year	Entrant	1	2	3	4	5	6	7	8	9	10	DC	Points
2008	Trident Racing	UAE; FEA; 14	UAE; SPR; 18	IND; FEA; Ret	IND; SPR; Ret	MAL; FEA; 8	MAL; SPR; Ret	BHR; FEA; 14	BHR; SPR; 5	UAE; FEA; 16	UAE; SPR; 7	18th	3

Sporting positions
Preceded by Romain Grosjean	Formula Lista Junior; Champion; 2004	Succeeded by Rolf Biland
Preceded by Florian Schnitzenbaumer	Austria Formula 3 Cup champion 2006	Succeeded by Stefan Neuburger
