= 2008 International Formula Master =

Seasons
- ← 2007 2009 →

The 2008 International Formula Master season was the second International Formula Master series season.

== Teams and drivers ==
All teams use a Tatuus chassis with a Honda K20A engine

Team	No	Driver	Rounds
(Italy) Cram Competition	1	(Spain) Arturo Llobell	All
(Italy) Cram Competition	2	(Mexico) Pablo Sánchez López	1-4
(Italy) Cram Competition	3	(Italy) Alberto Costa	1-3
(Italy) Cram Competition	9	(Italy) Marcello Puglisi	5-8
(Italy) Cram Competition	21	(Italy) Frankie Provenzano	5-8
(Italy) Euronova Racing	3	(Italy) Alberto Costa	5
(Italy) Euronova Racing	14	(Italy) Fabrizio Crestani	1-3
(Italy) Euronova Racing	15	(United Kingdom) Michael Meadows	1–3,5
(Italy) Euronova Racing	35	(Czech Republic) Tomáš Pivoda	4
(Italy) Euronova Racing	36	(Italy) Riccardo Cinti	8
(Italy) Euronova Racing	37	(Italy) Giacomo Ricci	7
(Italy) Euronova Racing	44	(United Kingdom) Oliver Oakes	8
(Italy) Euronova Racing	45	(Japan) Yuhi Sekiguchi	1–5,7-8
(Italy) Euronova Racing	46	(Italy) Daniel Mancinelli	1–2,4
(Italy) JD Motorsport	4	(Bulgaria) Vladimir Arabadzhiev	All
(Italy) JD Motorsport	5	(Russia) Sergey Afanasiev	All
(Italy) JD Motorsport	6	(New Zealand) Chris van der Drift	All
(Italy) ADM Motorsport	7	(Italy) Davide Rigon	4
(Italy) ADM Motorsport	8	(Czech Republic) Tomáš Pivoda	5-8
(Italy) ADM Motorsport	11	(New Zealand) Earl Bamber	7
(Italy) ADM Motorsport	16	(Brazil) Octavio Freitas	1-3
(Italy) ADM Motorsport	17	(Austria) Norbert Siedler	1-6
(Italy) ADM Motorsport	20	(Italy) Federico Scionti	8
(Italy) ADM Motorsport	21	(Italy) Frankie Provenzano	1-3
(Italy) ADM Motorsport	22	(Italy) Michele Caliendo	All
(Italy) Pro Motorsport	9	(Italy) Marcello Puglisi	1-4
(Italy) Pro Motorsport	10	(Brazil) Carlos Iaconelli	1-2
(Italy) Pro Motorsport	17	(Austria) Norbert Siedler	8
(Italy) Pro Motorsport	41	(Romania) Mihai Marinescu	8
(Czech Republic) ISR Racing	18	(Czech Republic) Filip Salaquarda	All
(Czech Republic) ISR Racing	19	(Germany) Tim Sandtler	All
(Italy) Scuderia Famà	21	(Italy) Frankie Provenzano	4
(Italy) Scuderia Famà	25	(Italy) Luca Persiani	1–5,8
(Italy) Scuderia Famà	26	(Germany) Dominik Schraml	1-2
(Italy) Scuderia Famà	46	(Italy) Daniel Mancinelli	5,7-8
(Switzerland) Jenzer Motorsport	23	(Switzerland) Fabio Leimer	All
(Switzerland) Jenzer Motorsport	24	(Romania) Matei Mihaescu	All
(Switzerland) Iris Project	27	(Germany) Michael Ammermüller	1-7
(Switzerland) Iris Project	28	(Switzerland) Marco Menotti	7
(Switzerland) Iris Project	35	(Switzerland) Simon Trummer	8
(Italy) Trident Racing	27	(Germany) Michael Ammermüller	8
(Italy) Trident Racing	31	(Latvia) Harald Schlegelmilch	All
(Italy) Trident Racing	32	(Denmark) Kasper Andersen	1-5
(Italy) Trident Racing	33	(Spain) Alejandro Núñez	1-5
(Italy) Trident Racing	34	(Mexico) Esteban Gutiérrez	7
(Italy) Trident Racing	47	(Germany) Dominik Wasem	8
(United Kingdom) Team JVA	29	(Czech Republic) Josef Král	All
(United Kingdom) Team JVA	30	(Thailand) Tor Graves	All
(Italy) Alan Racing	43	(Russia) Sergey Mokshantsev	8

== Race calendar ==
Round		Location	Circuit	Date	Pole position	Fastest lap	Winning driver	Winning team
1	R1	Valencia, Spain	Circuit de Valencia	17 May	(New Zealand) Chris van der Drift	(New Zealand) Chris van der Drift	(New Zealand) Chris van der Drift	(Italy) JD Motorsport
1	R2	Valencia, Spain	Circuit de Valencia	18 May		(New Zealand) Chris van der Drift	(New Zealand) Chris van der Drift	(Italy) JD Motorsport
2	R1	Pau, France	Pau Circuit	31 May	(New Zealand) Chris van der Drift	(Austria) Norbert Siedler	(Russia) Sergey Afanasyev	(Italy) JD Motorsport
2	R2	Pau, France	Pau Circuit	1 June		(Switzerland) Fabio Leimer	(Italy) Marcello Puglisi	(Italy) Pro Motorsport
3	R1	Brno, Czech Republic	Masaryk Circuit	14 June	(New Zealand) Chris van der Drift	(New Zealand) Chris van der Drift	(New Zealand) Chris van der Drift	(Italy) JD Motorsport
3	R2	Brno, Czech Republic	Masaryk Circuit	15 June		(Mexico) Pablo Sánchez López	(Latvia) Harald Schlegelmilch	(Italy) Trident Racing
4	R1	Estoril, Portugal	Autódromo do Estoril	12 July	(Switzerland) Fabio Leimer	(Switzerland) Fabio Leimer	(Switzerland) Fabio Leimer	(Switzerland) Jenzer Motorsport
4	R2	Estoril, Portugal	Autódromo do Estoril	13 July		(Bulgaria) Vladimir Arabadzhiev	(Bulgaria) Vladimir Arabadzhiev	(Italy) JD Motorsport
5	R1	(United Kingdom) Kent, UK	Brands Hatch	26 July	(New Zealand) Chris van der Drift	(Austria) Norbert Siedler	(New Zealand) Chris van der Drift	(Italy) JD Motorsport
5	R2	(United Kingdom) Kent, UK	Brands Hatch	27 July		(New Zealand) Chris van der Drift	(Germany) Michael Ammermüller	(Switzerland) Iris Project
6	R1	Oschersleben, Germany	Motorsport Arena Oschersleben	30 August	(New Zealand) Chris van der Drift	(New Zealand) Chris van der Drift	(New Zealand) Chris van der Drift	(Italy) JD Motorsport
6	R2	Oschersleben, Germany	Motorsport Arena Oschersleben	31 August		(Latvia) Harald Schlegelmilch	(Czech Republic) Josef Král	(United Kingdom) Team JVA
7	R1	Imola, Italy	Autodromo Enzo e Dino Ferrari	20 September	(New Zealand) Chris van der Drift	(New Zealand) Chris van der Drift	(Switzerland) Fabio Leimer	(Switzerland) Jenzer Motorsport
7	R2	Imola, Italy	Autodromo Enzo e Dino Ferrari	21 September		(Switzerland) Fabio Leimer	(New Zealand) Earl Bamber	(Italy) ADM Motorsport
8	R1	Monza, Italy	Autodromo Nazionale Monza	4 October	(New Zealand) Chris van der Drift	(New Zealand) Chris van der Drift	(Switzerland) Fabio Leimer	(Switzerland) Jenzer Motorsport
8	R2	Monza, Italy	Autodromo Nazionale Monza	5 October		(New Zealand) Chris van der Drift	(New Zealand) Chris van der Drift	(Italy) JD Motorsport

== Championship Standings ==
=== Drivers ===
Pos	Driver	VAL (Spain)		PAU^{†} (France)		BRN (Czech Republic)		EST (Portugal)		BRH (United Kingdom)		OSC (Germany)		IMO (Italy)		MNZ (Italy)		Pts
1	(New Zealand) Chris van der Drift	1	1	Ret	9	1	5	2	4	1	3	1	7	2	Ret	2	1	101
2	(Switzerland) Fabio Leimer	4	3	Ret	18	4	13	1	7	13	8	2	2	1	3	1	2	79
3	(Germany) Michael Ammermüller	3	5	4	5	2	4	3	8	6	1	3	3	5	5	9	5	74
4	(Latvia) Harald Schlegelmilch	8	2	Ret	13	8	1	4	5	Ret	4	13	13	6	4	5	14	46
5	(Spain) Arturo Llobell	5	12	6	4	Ret	15	6	2	DNS	11	6	8	17	11	4	13	29.5
6	(Czech Republic) Josef Král	17	9	16	10	12	12	13	14	Ret	Ret	7	1	8	2	7	3	29
7	(Bulgaria) Vladimir Arabadzhiev	Ret	11	3	Ret	3	9	7	1	Ret	14	10	4	15	12	Ret	Ret	29
8	(Russia) Sergey Afanasyev	12	4	1	Ret	9	6	10	12	DSQ	12	Ret	5	13	6	Ret	6	28
9	(Denmark) Kasper Andersen	2	Ret	7	2	5	7	5	6	Ret	Ret							27
10	(Austria) Norbert Siedler	13	Ret	2	7	7	3	Ret	Ret	Ret	10	4	12			15	Ret	22
11	(Italy) Marcello Puglisi	15	Ret	8	1	13	11	Ret	15	2	Ret	5	10	10	8	Ret	Ret	19
12	(Mexico) Pablo Sánchez López	7	17	9	6	6	2	11	Ret									14.5
13	(Italy) Daniel Mancinelli	23	15	19	16			17	13	4	2			11	9	Ret	16	13
14	(Germany) Tim Sandtler	18	Ret	10	22	11	8	8	3	8	Ret	8	Ret	Ret	10	8	7	13
15	(New Zealand) Earl Bamber													7	1			12
16	(Japan) Yuhi Sekiguchi	10	7	Ret	21	Ret	18	21	18	Ret	Ret			4	Ret	Ret	4	12
17	(Spain) Alejandro Núñez	11	8	5	3	Ret	17	12	9	10	7							10
18	(United Kingdom) Michael Meadows	16	13	Ret	Ret	14	10			3	6							9
19	(Mexico) Esteban Gutiérrez													3	7			8
20	(Italy) Frankie Provenzano	Ret	16	18	15	10	14	16	nc	9	5	9	Ret	9	14	6	Ret	7
21	(Italy) Alberto Costa	9	6	Ret	Ret	20	Ret			5	Ret							7
22	(Romania) Mihai Marinescu															3	Ret	6
23	(Romania) Matei Mihaescu	21	19	13	12	15	16	18	17	11	Ret	12	6	12	Ret	16	Ret	3
24	(Czech Republic) Filip Salaquarda	6	Ret	DNS	DNS	Ret	Ret	22	11	Ret	13	Ret	Ret	DNS	DNS	Ret	DNS	3
25	(Italy) Michele Caliendo	22	10	14	14	16	Ret	15	16	7	9	11	Ret	Ret	Ret	11	9	2
26	(Germany) Dominik Wasem															17	8	1
27	(Italy) Fabrizio Crestani	19	14	12	8	17	Ret											0.5
28	(Thailand) Tor Graves	Ret	Ret	17	20	Ret	20	19	19	Ret	17	14	9	14	15	14	Ret	0
29	(Italy) Davide Rigon							9	21									0
30	(Switzerland) Simon Trummer															10	10	0
31	(Italy) Luca Persiani	24	Ret	11	11	18	19	14	10	Ret	15					Ret	DNS	0
32	(Italy) Riccardo Cinti															12	11	0
33	(Czech Republic) Tomáš Pivoda							20	20	12	16	15	11	19	16	13	12	0
34	(Italy) Giacomo Ricci													16	13			0
35	(Brazil) Carlos Iaconelli	14	18	Ret	17													0
36	(Germany) Dominik Schraml	20	Ret	15	Ret													0
37	(Switzerland) Marco Menotti													18	17			0
38	(Russia) Sergey Mokshantsev															18	Ret	0
39	(Italy) Federico Scionti															Ret	15	0
40	(Brazil) Octavio Freitas	Ret	20	Ret	19	19	Ret											0
41	(United Kingdom) Oliver Oakes															DNS	Ret	0
Pos	Driver	VAL (Spain)		PAU^{†} (France)		BRN (Czech Republic)		EST (Portugal)		BRH (United Kingdom)		OSC (Germany)		IMO (Italy)		MNZ (Italy)		Pts

Colour	Result
Gold	Winner
Silver	Second place
Bronze	Third place
Green	Points classification
Blue	Non-points classification
Blue	Non-classified finish (NC)
Purple	Retired, not classified (Ret)
Red	Did not qualify (DNQ)
Red	Did not pre-qualify (DNPQ)
Black	Disqualified (DSQ)
White	Did not start (DNS)
White	Withdrew (WD)
White	Race cancelled (C)
Blank	Did not practice (DNP)
Blank	Did not arrive (DNA)
Blank	Excluded (EX)

^{†} Half points were awarded for Race 2 at Pau as less than 75% of the scheduled distance was completed.

=== Teams ===
Pos	Team	VAL (Spain)		PAU^{†} (France)		BRN (Czech Republic)		EST (Portugal)		BRH (United Kingdom)		OSC (Germany)		IMO (Italy)		MNZ (Italy)		Pts
1	(Italy) JD Motorsport	Ret	11	3	Ret	3	9	7	1	Ret	14	10	4	15	12	Ret	Ret	158
1	(Italy) JD Motorsport	1	1	Ret	9	1	5	2	4	1	3	1	7	2	Ret	2	1	158
2	(Italy) Trident Racing	8	2	Ret	13	8	1	4	5	Ret	4	13	13	6	4	5	14	96
2	(Italy) Trident Racing	2	Ret	7	2	5	7	5	6	Ret	Ret			3	7	9	5	96
3	(Switzerland) Jenzer Motorsport	4	3	Ret	18	4	13	1	7	13	8	2	2	1	3	1	2	82
3	(Switzerland) Jenzer Motorsport	21	19	13	12	15	16	18	17	11	Ret	12	6	12	Ret	16	Ret	82
4	(Switzerland) Iris Project	3	5	4	5	2	4	3	8	6	1	3	3	5	5	10	10	70
4	(Switzerland) Iris Project													18	17			70
5	(Italy) Cram Competition	5	12	6	4	Ret	15	6	2	DNS	11	6	8	17	11	4	13	67
5	(Italy) Cram Competition	7	17	9	6	6	2	11	Ret	2	Ret	5	10	10	8	Ret	Ret	67
6	(Italy) ADM Motorsport	Ret	20	Ret	19	19	Ret	9	21	12	16	15	11	19	16	13	12	36
6	(Italy) ADM Motorsport	13	Ret	2	7	7	3	Ret	Ret	Ret	10	4	12	7	1	Ret	15	36
7	(United Kingdom) Team JVA	17	9	16	10	12	12	13	14	Ret	Ret	7	1	8	2	7	3	29
7	(United Kingdom) Team JVA	Ret	Ret	17	20	Ret	20	19	19	Ret	17	14	9	14	15	14	Ret	29
8	(Italy) Euronova Racing	19	14	12	8	17	Ret	17	13	5	Ret			16	13	12	11	25.5
8	(Italy) Euronova Racing	16	13	Ret	Ret	14	10	20	20	3	6			4	Ret	Ret	4	25.5
9	(Czech Republic) ISR Racing	6	Ret	DNS	DNS	Ret	Ret	22	11	Ret	13	Ret	Ret	DNS	DNS	Ret	DNS	16
9	(Czech Republic) ISR Racing	18	Ret	10	22	11	8	8	3	8	Ret	8	Ret	Ret	10	8	7	16
10	(Italy) Scuderia Famà	24	Ret	11	11	18	19	14	10	Ret	15					Ret	DNS	13
10	(Italy) Scuderia Famà	20	Ret	15	Ret			16	nc	4	2			11	9	Ret	16	13
11	(Italy) Pro Motorsport	15	Ret	8	1	13	11	Ret	15							15	Ret	12
11	(Italy) Pro Motorsport	14	18	Ret	17											3	Ret	12
12	(Italy) Alan Racing															18	Ret	0
Pos	Team	VAL (Spain)		PAU^{†} (France)		BRN (Czech Republic)		EST (Portugal)		BRH (United Kingdom)		OSC (Germany)		IMO (Italy)		MNZ (Italy)		Pts

Colour	Result
Gold	Winner
Silver	Second place
Bronze	Third place
Green	Points classification
Blue	Non-points classification
Blue	Non-classified finish (NC)
Purple	Retired, not classified (Ret)
Red	Did not qualify (DNQ)
Red	Did not pre-qualify (DNPQ)
Black	Disqualified (DSQ)
White	Did not start (DNS)
White	Withdrew (WD)
White	Race cancelled (C)
Blank	Did not practice (DNP)
Blank	Did not arrive (DNA)
Blank	Excluded (EX)

^{†} Half points were awarded for Race 2 at Pau as less than 75% of the scheduled distance was completed.
