= 2008 World Series by Renault =

Seasons
- ← 2007 2009 →

The 2008 World Series by Renault was the fourth season of Renault Sport's series of events, with three different championships racing under a single banner.

== Race calendar ==
Circuit	Date	Series
(Italy) Autodromo Nazionale Monza	26 April	FR3.5
(Italy) Autodromo Nazionale Monza	27 April	FR3.5
(Belgium) Circuit de Spa-Francorchamps	3 Mayo	All
(Belgium) Circuit de Spa-Francorchamps	4 Mayo	All
Circuit de Monaco	25 Mayo	FR3.5
(United Kingdom) Silverstone	7 June	All
(United Kingdom) Silverstone	8 June	All
(Hungary) Hungaroring	5 July	All
(Hungary) Hungaroring	6 July	All
(Germany) Nürburgring	30 August	All
(Germany) Nürburgring	31 August	All
(France) Bugatti Circuit	6 September	All
(France) Bugatti Circuit	7 September	All
(Portugal) Autódromo do Estoril	27 September	All
(Portugal) Autódromo do Estoril	28 September	All
(Spain) Circuit de Catalunya	18 October	All
(Spain) Circuit de Catalunya	19 October	All

- Event in light blue is not part of the World Series, but is a championship round for the Formula Renault 3.5 Series.

== Championships ==
=== Formula Renault 3.5 Series ===
Pos.	Driver	Team	Points
1	(Netherlands) Giedo van der Garde	(United Kingdom) P1 Motorsport	137
2	(France) Julien Jousse	(France) Tech 1 Racing	106
3	(Brazil) Fabio Carbone	(France) Ultimate Signature	97
4	(Spain) Miguel Molina	(Italy) Prema Powerteam	79
5	(Russia) Mikhail Aleshin	(United Kingdom) Carlin Motorsport	73

=== Eurocup Formula Renault 2.0 ===
Pos.	Driver	Team	Points
1	(Finland) Valtteri Bottas	(Germany) Motopark Academy	139
2	(Australia) Daniel Ricciardo	(France) SG Formula	136
3	(Italy) Andrea Caldarelli	(France) SG Formula	123
4	(Spain) Roberto Merhi	(Spain) Epsilon Euskadi	108
5	(Germany) Tobias Hegewald	(Germany) Motopark Academy	72

=== Eurocup Mégane Trophy ===
Pos.	Driver	Team	Points
1	(France) Michaël Rossi	(France) TDS Racing	170
2	(Belgium) Maxime Martin	(Belgium) Boutsen Energy Racing	154
3	(France) Dimitri Enjalbert	(France) Tech 1 Racing	126
4	(France) Matthieu Cheruy	(France) Tech 1 Racing	84
5	(France) Sébastien Dhouailly	(France) Team Lompech Sport	78
