= Mihai Marinescu =

Romanian racing driver

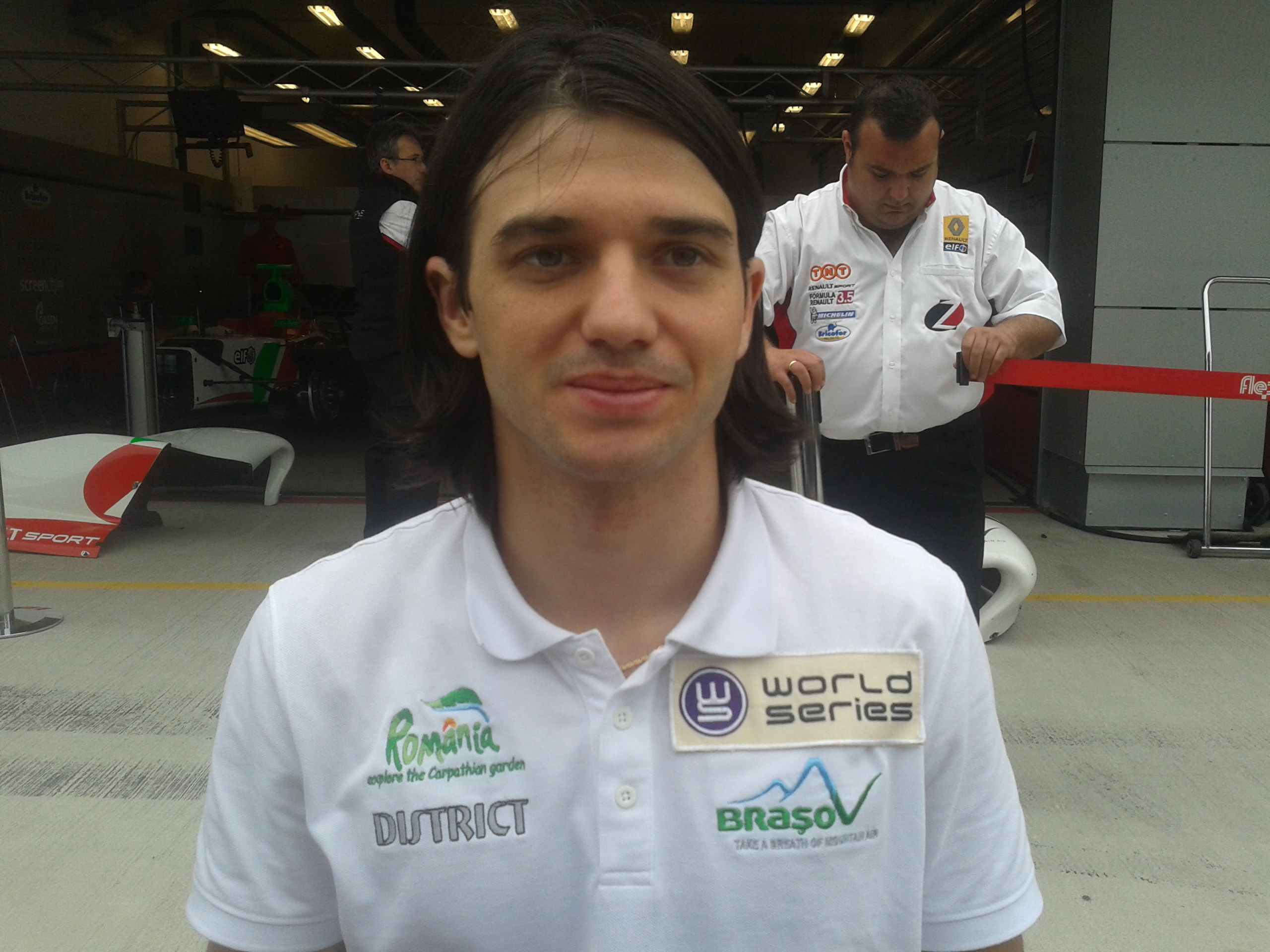
- Marinescu in 2013.
- Nationality: Romanian
- Born: 25 January 1989 (age 37) Brașov (Romania)

Formula Renault 3.5 Series career
- Debut season: 2009
- Current team: Zeta Corse
- Car number: 24
- Former teams: RC Motorsport; Interwetten.com
- Starts: 19
- Wins: 0
- Poles: 0
- Fastest laps: 0
- Best finish: 25th in 2013

Previous series
- 2010–12 2008 2006–07 2005, 2007 2006 2005 2005: FIA Formula Two Championship; Formula BMW Europe; Formula Renault 2.0 Italy; Eurocup Formula Renault 2.0; Formula Renault 2.0 NEC; Formula Junior 1600 Italy; Formula Renault 1.6 Belgium

Mihai Marinescu (born 25 January 1989) is a Romanian race engineer and former racing driver, formerly competing in the Formula Renault 3.5 Series.

Marinescu was born in Brașov, Romania, and currently works as a race engineer for AIX Racing.

== Career ==
=== Formula Junior & Formula Renault 1.6 ===
After securing several Romanian national karting titles, Marinescu began his racing career in 2005, driving in the Italian Formula Junior 1600 and Belgian Formula Renault 1.6 series. He took six podium places to finish runner-up in the Italian championship, behind Pasquale Di Sabatino, and took three race wins to finish third in the Belgian standings.

=== Formula Renault ===
In 2005, Marinescu also took part in selected Eurocup Formula Renault 2.0 races and the end-of-season Italian Formula Renault 2.0 winter series, in which he finished thirteenth.

In 2006, Marinescu drove a full season in the Italian Formula Renault 2.0 championship, finishing eleventh, and in the Formula Renault 2.0 Northern European Cup, where he finished sixth overall. He also drove in three French Formula Renault 2.0 races, failing to score a point.

In 2007, Marinescu dovetailed two championships once again, racing full seasons in both Eurocup Formula Renault 2.0 and Italian Formula Renault 2.0. In the former, he secured a single podium finish at the Hungaroring to be classified in eleventh place, whilst in the latter he took three podium places to finish fifth in the championship.

=== British Formula 3 ===
At the end of the 2007 season, Marinescu also contested two British Formula 3 Championship races for Räikkönen Robertson Racing at Rockingham Motor Speedway, taking a National Class podium during the weekend.

=== Formula BMW ===
For 2008, Marinescu joined Fisichella Motor Sport to race in the newly formed Formula BMW Europe championship, which supported the Formula One World Championship at each European race meeting. He finished eleventh in the championship. In November 2008, he took victory in the Formula BMW Pacific race that supported the annual Formula Three Macau Grand Prix. He also took part in selected races in the Formula BMW Americas championship. At Montreal in June 2008, he was lucky to escape unhurt from a massive first lap crash involving Mikaël Grenier and Daniel Juncadella.

=== International Formula Master ===
In October 2008, Marinescu competed in the final round of the International Formula Master season at Monza. Driving for Pro Motorsport, he finished third in the first race before retiring from the second event.

=== Formula Renault 3.5 Series ===
In March 2009, Marinescu took part in Formula Renault 3.5 Series pre-season testing for the Austrian Interwetten.com team before signing with them a few days before the first round of the season in Barcelona. However, he was replaced by Tobias Hegewald after the first championship event, but this was only for Hegewald to gain experience of the circuit for his forthcoming F2 campaign, with Marinescu returning to the team for the following round in Monaco.

However, before the next round in Hungary, Marinescu left Interwetten.com and signed for the Italian RC Motorsport team to partner Pasquale Di Sabatino. He returned to Interwetten at Le Mans, but failed to break into the points.

=== Formula Two ===
In 2010, Marinescu joined the FIA Formula Two Championship. He consistently finished in the midfield, and signed up to race in the series again in 2011. On 1 October 2011, Marinescu won his maiden race in Formula 2 at Monza.

== Post racing career ==
Marinescu is an established race engineer with experience in F4 and F3. He has worked for Prema Racing and AIX Racing, and has worked with drivers including Mick Schumacher and Max Verstappen.

As preparation for his engineering degree, Marinescu built a racing simulator using one of his former F2 cars. The simulator was made available to the public for several years at a pub in his hometown of Brașov.

He has also been a regular commentator on Romanian broadcasts of the 24 Hours of Le Mans.

=== Hobbies ===
Marinescu is an avid bicycle rider and keeps fit during the winter break by cycling in the mountains around his home city Braşov. A video featuring the young race driver descending the famous Transfăgărășan highway in Romania on his Trek racing bike became an instant hit on YouTube.

== Racing record ==
=== Career summary ===
Season	Series	Team	Races	Wins	Poles	F/Laps	Podiums	Points	Position
2005	Italian Formula Junior 1600	AP Motorsport	12	2	0	0	6	200	**2nd**
2005	Italian Formula Renault 2.0 Winter Series	AP Motorsport	4	0	0	?	0	9	13th
2005	Formula Renault 1.6 Belgium	District Racing	10	3	1	?	7	142	**3rd**
2005	Eurocup Formula Renault 2.0	Prema Powerteam	4	0	0	0	0	0	NC
2006	Italian Formula Renault 2.0	AP Motorsport	14	0	0	0	1	50	11th
2006	Formula Renault 2.0 NEC	Petrom District Racing	14	0	1	0	3	175	6th
2006	French Formula Renault 2.0	Petrom District Racing	3	0	0	0	0	0	NC
2007	Eurocup Formula Renault 2.0	Petrom District Racing AP	14	0	0	0	1	37	11th
2007	Italian Formula Renault 2.0	Petrom District Racing AP	13	0	1	0	3	206	5th
2007	British F3 National Class	Räikkönen Robertson Racing	2	0	0	0	1	22	13th
2008	Formula BMW Europe	FMS International	16	0	0	0	0	118	11th
2008	Formula BMW Americas	Integra Motorsports	2	0	0	0	0	0	NC†
2008	International Formula Master	Pro Motorsport	2	0	0	0	1	6	22nd
2008	Formula BMW Pacific	Motaworld Racing	1	1	1	0	1	N/A	N/A
2009	Formula Renault 3.5 Series	Interwetten.com	11	0	0	0	0	0	30th
2009	Formula Renault 3.5 Series	RC Motorsport	11	0	0	0	0	0	30th
2010	FIA Formula Two Championship	MotorSport Vision	18	0	0	1	0	68	11th
2011	FIA Formula Two Championship	MotorSport Vision	16	1	1	2	4	138	5th
2011	GP2 Final	Rapax	2	0	0	0	0	0	24th
2012	FIA Formula Two Championship	MotorSport Vision	16	2	3	3	4	161	5th
2013	Formula Renault 3.5 Series	Zeta Corse	8	0	0	0	0	5	25th
2013	Eurocup Mégane Trophy	Oregon Team	2	0	0	0	0	0	NC†

^{†} As Marinescu was a guest driver, he was ineligible to score points.

=== Complete Eurocup Formula Renault 2.0 results ===
(key) (Races in bold indicate pole position; races in italics indicate fastest lap)

Year	Entrant	1	2	3	4	5	6	7	8	9	10	11	12	13	14	15	16	DC	Points
2005	Prema Powerteam	ZOL; 1	ZOL; 2	VAL; 1	VAL; 2	LMS; 1	LMS; 2	BIL; 1	BIL; 2	OSC; 1	OSC; 2	DON; 1	DON; 2	EST; 1; 31	EST; 2; 21	MNZ; 1 Ret	MNZ; 2 Ret	47th	0
2007	Petrom District Racing AP	ZOL; 1; 16	ZOL; 2 NC	NÜR; 1; 5	NÜR; 2 Ret	HUN; 1; 3	HUN; 2; 8	DON; 1; 9	DON; 2; 8	MAG; 1; 31†	MAG; 2 DSQ	EST; 1; 8	EST; 2; 5	CAT; 1; 9	CAT; 2; 10			11th	37

=== Complete Formula Renault 2.0 NEC results ===
(key) (Races in bold indicate pole position) (Races in italics indicate fastest lap)

Year	Entrant	1	2	3	4	5	6	7	8	9	10	11	12	13	14	15	16	DC	Points
2006	Petrol District Racing	OSC; 1 Ret	OSC; 2; 6	SPA; 1; 12	SPA; 2 Ret	NÜR; 1; 8	NÜR; 2; 10	ZAN; 1	ZAN; 2	OSC; 1; 9	OSC; 2; 16	ASS; 1; 2	ASS; 2; 4	AND; 1; 9	AND; 2; 4	SAL; 1; 3	**SAL**; **2**; 3	6th	175

=== Complete Formula Renault 3.5 Series results ===
(key) (Races in bold indicate pole position) (Races in italics indicate fastest lap)

Year	Team	1	2	3	4	5	6	7	8	9	10	11	12	13	14	15	16	17	Pos	Points
2009	Interwetten.com Racing	CAT; 1 Ret	CAT; 2; 13	SPA; 1	SPA; 2	MON; 1 Ret					BUG; 1; 16	BUG; 2; 14	ALG; 1	ALG; 2	NÜR; 1; 15	NÜR; 2; 15	ALC; 1; 20	ALC; 2; 17	30th	0
2009	RC Motorsport						HUN; 1 Ret	HUN; 2; 11	SIL; 1	SIL; 2									30th	0
2013	Zeta Corse	MNZ; 1; 8	MNZ; 2; 10	ALC; 1 Ret	ALC; 2 Ret	MON; 1	SPA; 1; 21	SPA; 2; 14	MSC; 1; 20	MSC; 2; 18	RBR; 1	RBR; 2	HUN; 1	HUN; 2	LEC; 1	LEC; 2	CAT; 1	CAT; 2	25th	5

=== Complete FIA Formula Two Championship results ===
(key) (Races in bold indicate pole position) (Races in italics indicate fastest lap)

Year	1	2	3	4	5	6	7	8	9	10	11	12	13	14	15	16	17	18	Pos	Points
2010	SIL; 1; 7	SIL; 2; 8	MAR; 1 Ret	MAR; 2; 14	MNZ; 1; 5	MNZ; 2; 16	ZOL; 1; 8	ZOL; 2; 6	ALG; 1; 12	ALG; 2; 4	BRH; 1; 12	BRH; 2; 6	BRN; 1; 16	BRN; 2; 11	OSC; 1; 13	OSC; 2; 6	VAL; 1; 13	VAL; 2; 6	11th	68
2011	SIL; 1; 4	SIL; 2; 5	MAG; 1 Ret	MAG; 2; 5	SPA; 1; 8	SPA; 2; 5	NÜR; 1 Ret	NÜR; 2; 11	BRH; 1 Ret	BRH; 2; 4	RBR; 1; 3	RBR; 2; 3	**MNZ**; **1**; 1	MNZ; 2 Ret	CAT; 1; 5	CAT; 2; 3			5th	138
2012	SIL; 1; 4	**SIL**; **2**; 2	ALG; 1; 10	ALG; 2 Ret	**NÜR**; **1**; 1	NÜR; 2; 2	SPA; 1; 4	SPA; 2; 11	BRH; 1; 4	**BRH**; **2**; 1	LEC; 1; 7	LEC; 2; 7	HUN; 1 Ret	HUN; 2; 7	MNZ; 1; 6	MNZ; 2; 4			5th	161

=== Complete GP2 Final results ===
(key) (Races in bold indicate pole position) (Races in italics indicate fastest lap)

Year	Entrant	1	2	DC	Points
2011	Rapax	YMC; FEA; 17	YMC; SPR; Ret	24th	0
