= Simon Trummer =

Swiss racing driver (born 1989)

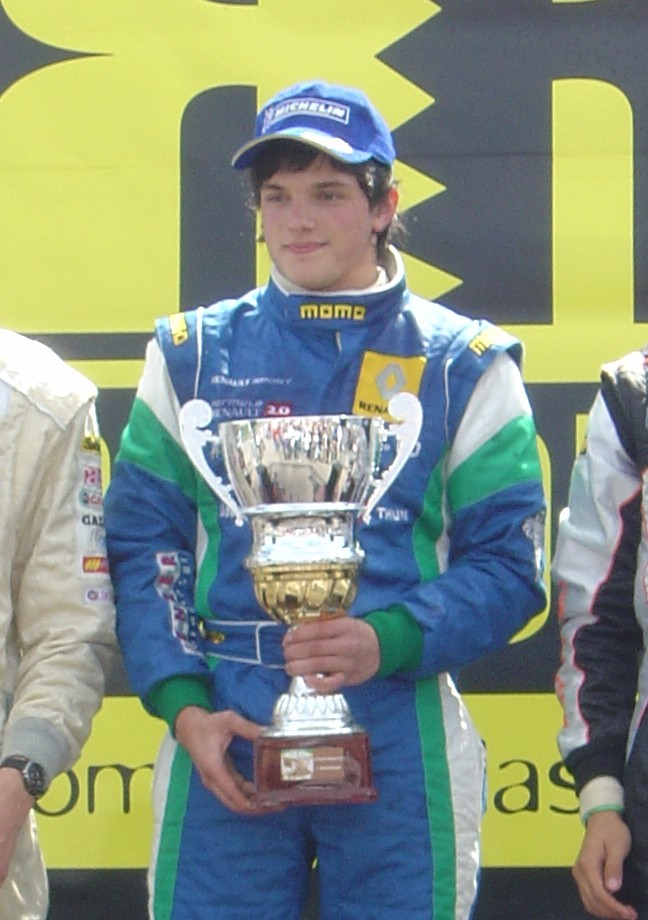
- Trummer in 2008
- Nationality: (Switzerland) Swiss
- Born: 8 June 1989 (age 37) Frutigen, Switzerland

GP2 Series career
- Debut season: 2012
- Current team: Hilmer Motorsport
- Categorisation: FIA Gold
- Car number: 24
- Former teams: Arden International, Rapax
- Starts: 72
- Wins: 0
- Poles: 0
- Fastest laps: 0
- Best finish: 17th in 2014

Previous series
- 2010–2011 2008–09 2008 2007–08 2006: GP3 Series; International Formula Master; Formula Renault 2.0 Italia; Formula Renault 2.0 Suisse; Formula Lista Junior

Simon Trummer (born 8 June 1989 in Frutigen, Canton of Bern) is a Swiss racing driver.

== Career ==
=== Karting ===
Trummer began his motorsport career in karting back in 2003, finishing second in the Swiss Junior Championship. He also finished 21st in the Andrea Margutti Trophy ICA Junior class.

=== Formula Lista Junior ===
Trummer moved up to single-seaters in 2006, competing in Formula Lista Junior. He finished eighteenth overall in the championship with ten points.

=== Formula Renault ===
Trummer joined the BMS Böhlen Motorsport team in 2007, to compete in the Formule Renault 2.0 Suisse championship. He wasn't so successful in this series, winding up seventh in the championship. Trummer switched teams, joining Jenzer Motorsport for 2008 and finished the season as runner-up.

=== International Formula Master ===
After two races at the end of the 2008 season, Trummer moved up to the International Formula Master series for the 2009 season, with Iris Project. He finished in eleventh place in the standings.

=== GP3 Series ===
Trummer stepped up to the new GP3 Series with Jenzer Motorsport in 2010. He finished the season in 25th place with four points, despite missing the round in Hungary due to driving into the rear of another car in Hockenheim. During 2010 in GP3 with Jenzer Motorsport, he was always outperformed by fellow Swiss driver Nico Müller which lead Simon to seak another team for 2011. He moved to MW Arden for the 2011 campaign. Trummer had three point-scoring finishes in final races, improving to 18th position with nine points.

=== GP2 Series ===
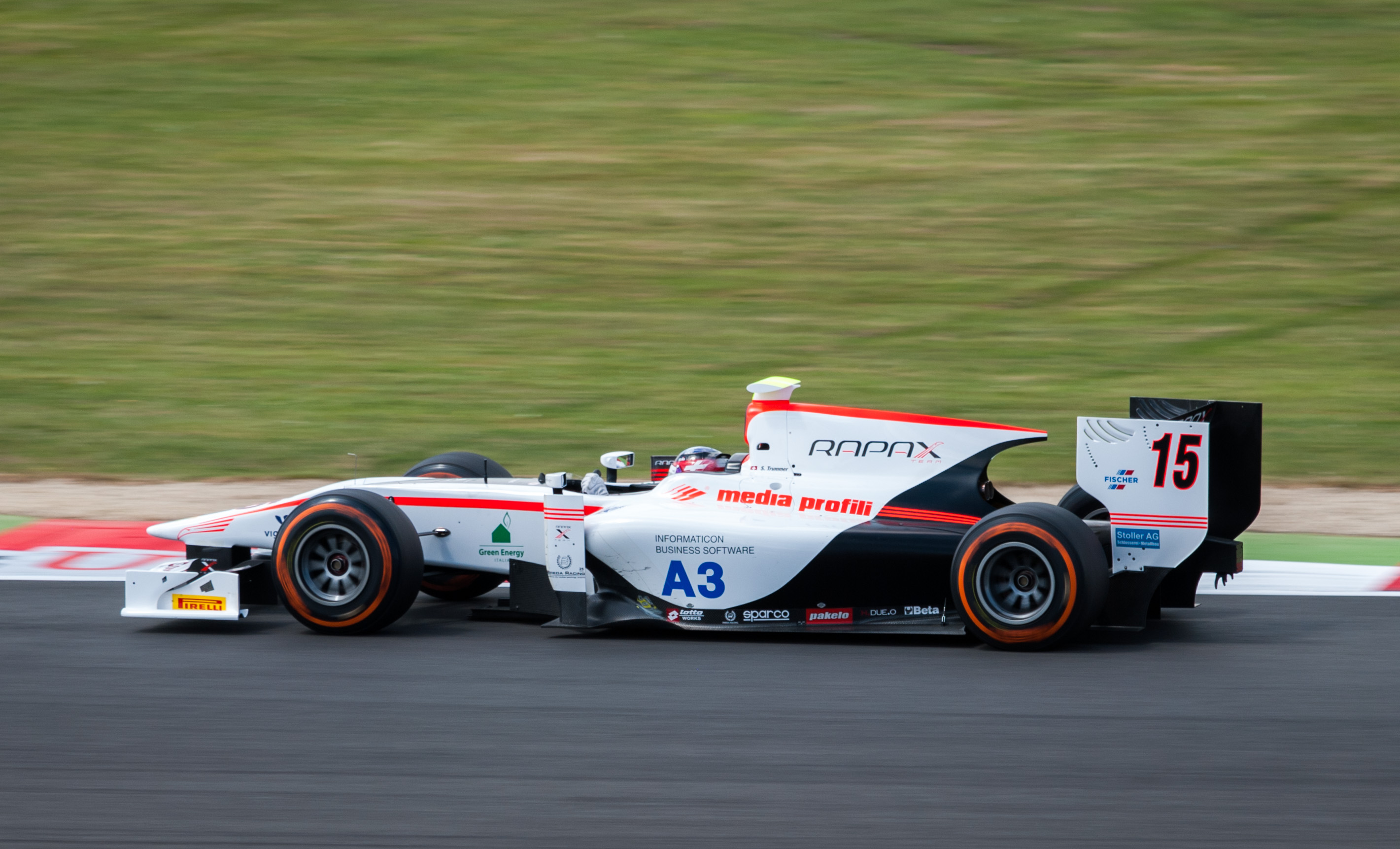
Trummer competing at the Silverstone round of the 2014 GP2 Series.

After competing in the non-championship season finale at Yas Marina in 2011, Trummer continued his collaboration with Arden International into 2012 by switching to the GP2 Series full-time. He joined series veteran Luiz Razia in the team, and finished 23rd in the final standings. He then went to Rapax in the 2013 GP2 Series season, and is confirmed with Rapax for the 2014 season.

== Racing record ==
=== Career summary ===
Season	Series	Team	Races	Wins	Poles	F/Laps	Podiums	Points	Position
2006	Formula Lista Junior	N/A	?	0	0	0	0	10	18th
2007	LO Formula Renault 2.0 Suisse	BMS Böhlen Motorsport	12	0	0	0	0	119	7th
2008	LO Formula Renault 2.0 Suisse	Jenzer Motorsport	12	2	4	1	9	244	**2nd**
2008	Formula Renault 2.0 Italy	Jenzer Motorsport	6	0	0	0	0	7	33rd
2008	International Formula Master	Iris Project	2	0	0	0	0	0	30th
2009	International Formula Master	Iris Project	16	0	0	0	1	11	11th
2010	GP3 Series	Jenzer Motorsport	14	0	0	0	0	4	25th
2011	GP3 Series	MW Arden	16	0	0	0	0	9	18th
2011	GP2 Final	Arden International	2	0	0	0	0	0	21st
2012	GP2 Series	Arden International	24	0	0	0	0	4	23rd
2013	GP2 Series	Rapax	22	0	0	0	0	20	21st
2014	GP2 Series	Rapax	22	0	0	0	1	26	17th
2014	FIA World Endurance Championship	Lotus	1	0	0	0	0	0	28th
2015	FIA World Endurance Championship	Team ByKolles	8	0	0	0	0	13	15th
2015	24 Hours of Le Mans	Team ByKolles	1	0	0	0	0	N/A	EX
2015	Porsche Supercup	Fach Auto Tech	1	0	0	0	0	0	28th
2015	GP2 Series	Hilmer Motorsport	4	0	0	0	0	0	31st
2016	FIA World Endurance Championship	ByKolles Racing Team	9	0	0	0	0	19.5	17th
2016	24 Hours of Le Mans	ByKolles Racing Team	1	0	0	0	0	N/A	DNF
2017	FIA World Endurance Championship - LMP2	CEFC Manor TRS Racing	9	0	0	0	0	46	18th
2017	24 Hours of Le Mans - LMP2	CEFC Manor TRS Racing	1	0	0	0	0	N/A	DNF
2018	IMSA SportsCar Championship - DPi	JDC-Miller MotorSports	10	0	1	0	0	216	11th
2018	24 Hours of Nürburgring - SP9	Car Collection Motorsport	1	0	0	0	0	N/A	18th
2019	IMSA SportsCar Championship - DPi	JDC-Miller MotorSports	10	0	0	0	0	237	8th
2019	24 Hours of Nürburgring - SP9	Octane126 Serliana	1	0	0	0	0	N/A	DNF
2020	IMSA SportsCar Championship - LMP2	PR1 Mathiasen Motorsports	6	3	6	3	4	161	**2nd**
2020	European Le Mans Series - LMP2	Algarve Pro Racing	4	0	0	0	0	15.5	15th
2020	24 Hours of Le Mans - LMP2	Algarve Pro Racing	1	0	0	0	0	N/A	7th
2020	24 Hours of Nürburgring - SP9	Octane126 Serliana	1	0	0	0	0	N/A	DNF
2021	Asian Le Mans Series - LMP2	Phoenix Racing	4	0	0	0	3	57	4th
2021	FIA World Endurance Championship - LMP2	PR1 Motorsports	2	0	0	0	0	0	NC†
2021	24 Hours of Le Mans - LMP2	PR1 Motorsports	1	0	0	0	0	N/A	DNF
2021	24 Hours of Nürburgring - SP9	Octane126 Serliana	1	0	0	0	0	N/A	DNF
2022	24 Hours of Nürburgring - SP9	Octane126 Serliana	1	0	0	0	0	N/A	DNF

^{†} As Trummer was a guest driver, he was ineligible for championship points.
^{*} Season still in progress.

=== Complete GP3 Series results ===
(key) (Races in bold indicate pole position) (Races in italics indicate fastest lap)

Year	Entrant	1	2	3	4	5	6	7	8	9	10	11	12	13	14	15	16	DC	Points
2010	Jenzer Motorsport	CAT; FEA; 6	CAT; SPR; 8	IST; FEA; 20	IST; SPR; 13	VAL; FEA; 13	VAL; SPR; 27	SIL; FEA; 17	SIL; SPR; 12	HOC; FEA; 11	HOC; SPR; Ret	HUN; FEA	HUN; SPR	SPA; FEA; 8	SPA; SPR; Ret	MNZ; FEA; Ret	MNZ; SPR; 24	25th	4
2011	MW Arden	IST; FEA; 19	IST; SPR; 21	CAT; FEA; 27	CAT; SPR; 25†	VAL; FEA; Ret	VAL; SPR; Ret	SIL; FEA; 12	SIL; SPR; 10	NÜR; FEA; 9	NÜR; SPR; 16	HUN; FEA; 16	HUN; SPR; 12	SPA; FEA; 19	SPA; SPR; 5	MNZ; FEA; 5	MNZ; SPR; 4	18th	9

=== Complete GP2 Series results ===
(key) (Races in bold indicate pole position) (Races in italics indicate fastest lap)

Year	Entrant	1	2	3	4	5	6	7	8	9	10	11	12	13	14	15	16	17	18	19	20	21	22	23	24	DC	Points
2012	Arden International	SEP; FEA; 22	SEP; SPR; 16	BHR1; FEA; 16	BHR1; SPR; 8	BHR2; FEA; 14	BHR2; SPR; 24	CAT; FEA; 23	CAT; SPR; 20	MON; FEA; 12	MON; SPR; 9	VAL; FEA; 10	VAL; SPR; 7	SIL; FEA; 15	SIL; SPR; 11	HOC; FEA; 16	HOC; SPR; 17	HUN; FEA; 13	HUN; SPR; 13	SPA; FEA; 15	SPA; SPR; 16	MNZ; FEA; 16	MNZ; SPR; 17	MRN; FEA; Ret	MRN; SPR; 14	23rd	4
2013	Rapax	SEP; FEA; 9	SEP; SPR; 6	BHR; FEA; 9	BHR; SPR; 14	CAT; FEA; 19	CAT; SPR; 16	MON; FEA; 13	MON; SPR; 23	SIL; FEA; 24	SIL; SPR; 16	NÜR; FEA; 14	NÜR; SPR; 9	HUN; FEA; 6	HUN; SPR; 7	SPA; FEA; 12	SPA; SPR; 11	MNZ; FEA; Ret	MNZ; SPR; 16	MRN; FEA; 16	MRN; SPR; 13	YMC; FEA; 13	YMC; SPR; 7			21st	20
2014	Rapax	BHR; FEA; 7	BHR; SPR; 2	CAT; FEA; 12	CAT; SPR; Ret	MON; FEA; Ret	MON; SPR; 18	RBR; FEA; 20	RBR; SPR; 20	SIL; FEA; 25	SIL; SPR; 18	HOC; FEA; 6	HOC; SPR; 14	HUN; FEA; 11	HUN; SPR; 13	SPA; FEA; 18	SPA; SPR; 17	MNZ; FEA; 19	MNZ; SPR; 11	SOC; FEA; 15	SOC; SPR; 21	YMC; FEA; 17	YMC; SPR; 16			17th	26
2015	Hilmer Motorsport	BHR; FEA	BHR; SPR	CAT; FEA	CAT; SPR	MON; FEA	MON; SPR	RBR; FEA; 22	RBR; SPR; 18	SIL; FEA	SIL; SPR	HUN; FEA	HUN; SPR	SPA; FEA	SPA; SPR	MNZ; FEA; 16	MNZ; SPR; 16	SOC; FEA	SOC; SPR	BHR; FEA	BHR; SPR	YMC; FEA	YMC; SPR			31st	0

==== Complete GP2 Final results ====
(key) (Races in bold indicate pole position) (Races in italics indicate fastest lap)

Year	Entrant	1	2	DC	Points
2011	Arden International	YMC; FEA; Ret	YMC; SPR; 15	21st	0

=== Complete FIA World Endurance Championship results ===
Year	Entrant	Class	Chassis	Engine	1	2	3	4	5	6	7	8	9	Rank	Points
2014	Lotus	LMP1	CLM P1/01	AER P60 Turbo V6	SIL	SPA	LMS	COA	FUJ	SHA	BHR; Ret	SÃO		28th	0
2015	Team ByKolles	LMP1	CLM P1/01	AER P60 2.4 L Turbo V6	SIL; Ret	SPA; Ret	LMS; EX	NÜR; 15	COA; 8	FUJ; 8	SHA; 8	BHR; 12		15th	13
2016	ByKolles Racing Team	LMP1	CLM P1/01	AER P60 2.4 L Turbo V6	SIL; 14	SPA; 6	LMS; Ret	NÜR; Ret	MEX; 14	COA; 11	FUJ; Ret	SHA; 7	BHR; 8	17th	19.5
2017	CEFC Manor TRS Racing	LMP2	Oreca 07	Gibson GK428 4.2 L V8	SIL; 7	SPA; 8	LMS; Ret	NÜR; 7	MEX; 8	COA; Ret	FUJ; 7	SHA; 5	BHR; 5	18th	46

=== Complete 24 Hours of Le Mans results ===
Year	Team	Co-Drivers	Car	Class	Laps	Pos.	Class Pos.
2015	(Austria) Team ByKolles	(Portugal) Tiago Monteiro (Germany) Pierre Kaffer	CLM P1/01-AER	LMP1	260	EX	EX
2016	(Austria) Team ByKolles	(Germany) Pierre Kaffer (United Kingdom) Oliver Webb	CLM P1/01-AER	LMP1	206	DNF	DNF
2017	(China) CEFC Manor TRS Racing	(Mexico) Roberto González (Russia) Vitaly Petrov	Oreca 07-Gibson	LMP2	152	DNF	DNF
2020	(Portugal) Algarve Pro Racing	(United States) John Falb (United States) Matt McMurry	Oreca 07-Gibson	LMP2	365	11th	7th
2021	(United States) PR1 Motorsports Mathiasen	(United States) Patrick Kelly (France) Gabriel Aubry	Oreca 07-Gibson	LMP2; Pro-Am	261	DNF	DNF

=== Complete WeatherTech SportsCar Championship results ===
Year	Entrant	Class	Chassis	Engine	1	2	3	4	5	6	7	8	9	10	Rank	Points
2018	JDC-Miller MotorSports	P	Oreca 07	Gibson GK428 4.2 L V8	DAY; 6	SEB; 9	LBH; 13	MDO; 12	DET; 10	WGL; 8	MOS; 8	**ELK**; 12	LGA; 7	PET; 9	11th	216
2019	JDC-Miller MotorSports	DPi	Cadillac DPi-V.R	Cadillac 5.5L V8	DAY; 10	SEB; 8	LBH; 5	MDO; 7	DET; 4	WGL; 9	MOS; 8	ELK; 9	LGA; 9	PET; 5	8th	237
2020	PR1 Mathiasen Motorsports	LMP2	Oreca 07	Gibson GK428 4.2 L V8	**DAY**; 2	SEB	**ELK**; 4	**ATL**; 1	**PET**; 4	**LGA**; 1	**SEB**; 1				2nd	161

=== Complete European Le Mans Series results ===
(key) (Races in bold indicate pole position; results in italics indicate fastest lap)

Year	Entrant	Class	Chassis	Engine	1	2	3	4	5	Rank	Points
2020	Algarve Pro Racing	LMP2	Oreca 07	Gibson GK428 4.2 L V8	LEC; 10	SPA; 9	LEC; 5	MNZ; 11	ALG	15th	15.5

=== Complete Asian Le Mans Series results ===
(key) (Races in bold indicate pole position) (Races in italics indicate fastest lap)

Year	Team	Co-Drivers	Car	Engine	Class	No.	1	2	3	4	Pos.	Points
**2021**	(Germany) Phoenix Racing	(Liechtenstein) Matthias Kaiser (Denmark) Nicki Thiim (South Africa) Kelvin van der Linde	Oreca 07	Gibson GK428 4.2 L V8	**P2**	5	DUB; 1; 3	DUB; 2; 3	ABU; 1; 4	ABU; 2; 3	4th	57

Sporting positions
Preceded by Kyle Masson; Cameron Cassels	Michelin Endurance Cup; LMP2 Champion; 2020	Succeeded by Mikkel Jensen; Ben Keating; Scott Huffaker
