= Alessandro Vita Kouzkin =

Russian-Italian race car driver (born 1992)

- Nationality: Russian-Italian
- Born: 3 September 1992 (age 34) Rome, Italy

International Formula Master career
- Debut season: 2009
- Current team: Cram Competition
- Car number: 47
- Starts: 10
- Wins: 2
- Poles: 0
- Fastest laps: 0
- Best finish: 8th in 2009

Previous series
- 2008 2008: Formula Renault 2.0 Italia; Formule Renault 2.0 Suisse

Alessandro Vita Kouzkin (Russian: Алессандро Вита Кузькин; born 3 September 1992 in Rome, Italy) is a Russian-Italian race car driver. He is the son of Ernesto Vita, who was the owner of the hapless Life Formula One team, which failed to pre-qualify on all fourteen attempts in 1990.

== Career ==
=== Karting ===
Kouzkin made his debut in karting, in 2005 in the Italian Intercontinental A Junior Championship. He finished 28th in the championship, with two points. 2006 was a stellar year for Kouzkin, as he won the Bridgestone ICA Junior Cup, the 100cc Junior Champion Cup, and also the 100cc Torneo Industrie. There was disappointment though, as he finished 27th in the European Championship, which was won by current Eurocup Formula Renault 2.0 racer Miquel Monrás.

2007 saw a move up into both the KF2 and KF3 classes. In KF2, Kouzkin finished third in the Champions Cup, and also finished eleventh in the Bridgestone Cup. He continued that success in KF3, when he finished runner-up to Matteo Viganò in the WSK International Series. Third place in the South Garda Winter Cup and joint-eighth in the Italian Open Masters suggested that Kouzkin was ready to step up a further class on the karting ladder.

After poor performances in the 2008 KF2 Torneo Industrie and the KZ2 European Championship, Kouzkin completed his karting career in the KF1 class. With the Fausto Franchini team, he finished tenth in the South Garda Winter Cup and eleventh in the Andrea Margutti Trophy, before stepping up to single seaters.

=== Formula Renault ===
Kouzkin joined the Cram Competition team in 2008, to compete in both the Formula Renault 2.0 Italia and the Formule Renault 2.0 Suisse championships. In the Swiss championship, he finished sixth overall, winning races at Magny-Cours and Monza. He wasn't so successful in the Italian series, winding up fourteenth in the championship.

=== International Formula Master ===
In 2009, Kouzkin debuted in International Formula Master, continuing with Cram Competition. At the opening round of the season, Kouzkin won the second race on the streets of Pau. Kouzkin added a second win at Brands Hatch, taking a lights-to-flag victory from pole position, in the second race.

== Racing record ==
=== Career summary ===
Season	Series	Team	Races	Wins	Poles	F/Laps	Podiums	Points	Position
2008	Formula Renault 2.0 Italia	Cram Competition	14	0	0	0	1	76	14th
2008	Formule Renault 2.0 Suisse	Cram Competition	10	2	1	1	2	136	6th
2009	International Formula Master	Cram Competition	10	2	0	0	2	18	8th
