= 2011 GP2 Final =

(United Arab Emirates) 2011 Abu Dhabi GP2 round
Round details
- Round 10 (non-championship) of 10 rounds in the 2011 GP2 Series
- Yas Marina Circuit
- Location: Yas Marina Circuit, Abu Dhabi, United Arab Emirates
- Course: Permanent racing facility 5.554 km (3.451 mi)

GP2 Series

Feature race
- Date: 12 November 2011
- Laps: 31

Pole position
Driver	(Switzerland) Fabio Leimer	Racing Engineering
- Time: 1:49.363

Podium
First	(Switzerland) Fabio Leimer	Racing Engineering
Second	(Brazil) Luiz Razia	Caterham Team AirAsia
Third	(United Kingdom) Jolyon Palmer	Barwa Addax Team

Fastest lap
Driver	(Switzerland) Fabio Leimer	Racing Engineering
- Time: 1:51.493 (on lap 23)

Sprint race
- Date: 13 November 2011
- Laps: 22

Podium
First	(United Kingdom) James Calado	Lotus ART
Second	(Sweden) Marcus Ericsson	iSport International
Third	(France) Tom Dillmann	iSport International

Fastest lap
Driver	(Brazil) Luiz Razia	Caterham Team AirAsia
- Time: 1:51.551 (on lap 15)

The 2011 GP2 Final was a special round of the 2011 GP2 Series, supporting the 2011 Abu Dhabi Grand Prix on 12 and 13 November 2011. The race was originally scheduled to be the first round of the 2012 GP2 Asia championship, but with the GP2 Asia series being discontinued and absorbed into its parent series, the race was added to the GP2 Series calendar as a non-championship round.

== Entry list ==
As the race was a non-championship event, several teams elected to run guest drivers in the place of their regular drivers.

Team	No.	Driver
(Italy) Rapax	1	(Spain) Dani Clos
(Italy) Rapax	2	(Romania) Mihai Marinescu
(Spain) Barwa Addax Team	3	(United States) Jake Rosenzweig
(Spain) Barwa Addax Team	4	(United Kingdom) Jolyon Palmer
(France) Lotus ART	5	(United Kingdom) James Calado
(France) Lotus ART	6	(Mexico) Esteban Gutiérrez ^{1}
(Spain) Racing Engineering	7	(Switzerland) Fabio Leimer
(Spain) Racing Engineering	8	(France) Nathanaël Berthon
(United Kingdom) iSport International	9	(France) Tom Dillmann
(United Kingdom) iSport International	10	(Sweden) Marcus Ericsson ^{1}
(France) DAMS	11	(Indonesia) Rio Haryanto
(France) DAMS	12	(Netherlands) Nigel Melker
(United Kingdom) Arden International	14	(Czech Republic) Josef Král ^{1}
(United Kingdom) Arden International	15	(Switzerland) Simon Trummer
(United Kingdom) Super Nova Racing	16	(Italy) Giacomo Ricci
(United Kingdom) Super Nova Racing	17	(Italy) Fabio Onidi
(Italy) Scuderia Coloni	18	(Italy) Kevin Ceccon ^{2}
(Italy) Scuderia Coloni	19	(Monaco) Stefano Coletti
(Italy) Trident Racing	20	(Colombia) Julián Leal
(Italy) Trident Racing	21	(Monaco) Stéphane Richelmi ^{2}
(Portugal) Ocean Racing Technology	22	(France) Nicolas Marroc
(Portugal) Ocean Racing Technology	23	(Portugal) António Félix da Costa
(United Kingdom) Carlin	24	(United Kingdom) Max Chilton ^{1}
(United Kingdom) Carlin	25	(Czech Republic) Jan Charouz
(Malaysia) Caterham Team AirAsia	26	(United States) Alexander Rossi
(Malaysia) Caterham Team AirAsia	27	(Brazil) Luiz Razia ^{3}

Notes:

- ^1 − Denotes the regular driver of that car.
- ^2 − Driver competed at selected events in the regular season.
- ^3 − Luiz Razia competed in the regular season for Caterham Team AirAsia, driving car #26.

== Classification ==
=== Qualifying ===
Pos	No.	Driver	Team	Time	Gap	Grid
1	7	(Switzerland) Fabio Leimer	Racing Engineering	1:49.363		1
2	1	(Spain) Dani Clos	Rapax	1:49.570	+0.207	2
3	14	(Czech Republic) Josef Král	Arden International	1:49.612	+0.249	3
4	27	(Brazil) Luiz Razia	Caterham Team AirAsia	1:49.649	+0.286	4
5	4	(United Kingdom) Jolyon Palmer	Barwa Addax Team	1:49.697	+0.334	5
6	24	(United Kingdom) Max Chilton	Carlin	1:49.737	+0.374	6
7	18	(Italy) Kevin Ceccon	Scuderia Coloni	1:49.751	+0.388	7
8	6	(Mexico) Esteban Gutiérrez	Lotus ART	1:49.822	+0.459	8
9	9	(France) Tom Dillmann	iSport International	1:50.070	+0.707	9
10	19	(Monaco) Stefano Coletti	Scuderia Coloni	1:50.070	+0.707	10
11	16	(Italy) Giacomo Ricci	Super Nova Racing	1:50.074	+0.711	21^{4}
12	5	(United Kingdom) James Calado	Lotus ART	1:50.074	+0.711	11
13	12	(Netherlands) Nigel Melker	DAMS	1:50.147	+0.784	12
14	10	(Sweden) Marcus Ericsson	iSport International	1:50.230	+0.867	13
15	26	(United States) Alexander Rossi	Caterham Team AirAsia	1:50.236	+0.873	14
16	23	(Portugal) António Félix da Costa	Ocean Racing Technology	1:50.276	+0.913	15
17	8	(France) Nathanaël Berthon	Racing Engineering	1:50.296	+0.933	16
18	3	(United States) Jake Rosenzweig	Barwa Addax Team	1:50.374	+1.011	17
19	20	(Colombia) Julián Leal	Trident Racing	1:50.374	+1.011	18
20	11	(Indonesia) Rio Haryanto	DAMS	1:50.515	+1.152	19
21	21	(Monaco) Stéphane Richelmi	Trident Racing	1:50.600	+1.237	20
22	15	(Switzerland) Simon Trummer	Arden International	1:50.752	+1.389	22
23	17	(Italy) Fabio Onidi	Super Nova Racing	1:51.052	+1.689	23
24	25	(Czech Republic) Jan Charouz	Carlin	1:51.407	+2.044	24
25	2	(Romania) Mihai Marinescu	Rapax	1:51.893	+2.530	25
26	22	(France) Nicolas Marroc	Ocean Racing Technology	1:52.550	+3.187	26^{4}

Notes

- ^4 – Giacomo Ricci and Nicolas Marroc both received a ten grid place penalty for ignoring yellow flags during the practice session.

=== Feature Race ===
Pos	No.	Driver	Team	Laps	Time/Retired	Grid	Points
1	7	(Switzerland) Fabio Leimer	Racing Engineering	31	58:53.563	1	10+2+1
2	27	(Brazil) Luiz Razia	Caterham Team AirAsia	31	+6.911	4	8
3	4	(United Kingdom) Jolyon Palmer	Barwa Addax Team	31	+28.708	5	6
4	10	(Sweden) Marcus Ericsson	iSport International	31	+29.812	14	5
5	18	(Italy) Kevin Ceccon	Scuderia Coloni	31	+36.619	7	4
6	9	(France) Tom Dillmann	iSport International	31	+41.518	9	3
7	23	(Portugal) António Félix da Costa	Ocean Racing Technology	31	+42.496	16	2
8	5	(United Kingdom) James Calado	Lotus ART	31	+45.669	12	1
9	8	(France) Nathanaël Berthon	Racing Engineering	31	+51.345	17	
10	19	(Monaco) Stefano Coletti	Scuderia Coloni	31	+1:02.481	10	
11	16	(Italy) Giacomo Ricci	Super Nova Racing	31	+1:08.632	11	
12	11	(Indonesia) Rio Haryanto	DAMS	31	+1:13.503	20	
13	26	(United States) Alexander Rossi	Caterham Team AirAsia	31	+1:16.572	15	
14	22	(France) Nicolas Marroc	Ocean Racing Technology	31	+1:28.973	26	
15	12	(Netherlands) Nigel Melker	DAMS	31	+1:30.328	13	
16	20	(Colombia) Julián Leal	Trident Racing	31	+1:33.669	19	
17	2	(Romania) Mihai Marinescu	Rapax	31	+1:35.344	25	
18	17	(Italy) Fabio Onidi	Super Nova Racing	31	+1:43.541^{5}	23	
19	21	(Monaco) Stéphane Richelmi	Trident Racing	30	+1 lap	21	
20	14	(Czech Republic) Josef Král	Arden International	30	+1 lap	3	
21	6	(Mexico) Esteban Gutiérrez	Lotus ART	30	+1 lap	8	
Ret	3	(United States) Jake Rosenzweig	Barwa Addax Team	23	Retired	18	
Ret	15	(Switzerland) Simon Trummer	Arden International	23	Retired	22	
Ret	25	(Czech Republic) Jan Charouz	Carlin	18	Retired	24	
Ret	24	(United Kingdom) Max Chilton	Carlin	2	Retired	6	
Ret	1	(Spain) Dani Clos	Rapax	1	Retired	2	
Fastest lap: Fabio Leimer (Racing Engineering) 1:51.493 (lap 23)

Notes

- ^5 – Fabio Onidi received a twenty-second penalty for ignoring yellow flags during the feature race.

=== Sprint Race ===
Pos	No.	Driver	Team	Laps	Time/Retired	Grid	Points
1	5	(United Kingdom) James Calado	Lotus ART	22	41:26.194	1	6
2	10	(Sweden) Marcus Ericsson	iSport International	22	+1.770	5	5
3	9	(France) Tom Dillmann	iSport International	22	+7.695	3	4
4	4	(United Kingdom) Jolyon Palmer	Barwa Addax Team	22	+13.040	6	3
5	6	(Mexico) Esteban Gutiérrez	Lotus ART	22	+27.012	21	2
6	18	(Italy) Kevin Ceccon	Scuderia Coloni	22	+28.025	4	1
7	26	(United States) Alexander Rossi	Caterham Team AirAsia	22	+29.909	13	
8	2	(Brazil) Luiz Razia	Caterham Team AirAsia	22	+30.022	7	1
9	1	(Spain) Dani Clos	Rapax	22	+30.139	25	
10	7	(Switzerland) Fabio Leimer	Racing Engineering	22	+30.570	8	
11	17	(Italy) Fabio Onidi	Super Nova Racing	22	+33.066	18	
12	14	(Czech Republic) Josef Král	Arden International	22	+40.517	20	
13	23	(Portugal) António Félix da Costa	Ocean Racing Technology	22	+44.351	2	
14	3	(United States) Jake Rosenzweig	Barwa Addax Team	22	+45.524	22	
15	15	(Switzerland) Simon Trummer	Arden International	22	+45.921	26^{6}	
16	24	(United Kingdom) Max Chilton	Carlin	22	+46.846	24	
17	25	(Czech Republic) Jan Charouz	Carlin	22	+48.347	23	
18	21	(Monaco) Stéphane Richelmi	Trident Racing	22	+48.702	19	
19	8	(France) Nathanaël Berthon	Racing Engineering	22	+49.101	9	
20	12	(Netherlands) Nigel Melker	DAMS	22	+49.778	15	
21	20	(Colombia) Julián Leal	Trident Racing	22	+50.399	16	
22	22	(France) Nicolas Marroc	Ocean Racing Technology	22	+53.398	14	
23	16	(Italy) Giacomo Ricci	Super Nova Racing	22	+59.543	11	
24	11	(Indonesia) Rio Haryanto	DAMS	22	+1:12.642	12	
25	19	(Monaco) Stefano Coletti	Scuderia Coloni	21	Collision	10	
Ret	2	(Romania) Mihai Marinescu	Rapax	10	Accident	17	
Fastest lap: Luiz Razia (Caterham Team AirAsia) 1:51.551 (lap 15)

Notes

- ^6 – Simon Trummer received a ten place grid penalty for causing a collision during the feature race.

== Standings ==
=== Drivers' Championship ===
Pos	Driver	R1	R2	Points
1	(Switzerland) Fabio Leimer	1	10	13
2	(Sweden) Marcus Ericsson	4	2	10
3	(Brazil) Luiz Razia	2	8	9
4	(United Kingdom) Jolyon Palmer	3	4	9
5	(United Kingdom) James Calado	8	1	7
6	(France) Tom Dillmann	6	3	7
7	(Italy) Kevin Ceccon	5	6	5
8	(Mexico) Esteban Gutiérrez	21	5	2
9	(Portugal) António Félix da Costa	7	13	2
10	(United States) Alexander Rossi	13	7	0
11	(France) Nathanaël Berthon	9	19	0
12	(Spain) Dani Clos	Ret	9	0
13	(Monaco) Stefano Coletti	10	Ret	0
14	(Italy) Fabio Onidi	18	11	0
15	(Italy) Giacomo Ricci	11	23	0
16	(Czech Republic) Josef Král	20	12	0
17	(Indonesia) Rio Haryanto	12	24	0
18	(France) Nicolas Marroc	14	22	0
19	(United States) Jake Rosenzweig	Ret	14	0
20	(Netherlands) Nigel Melker	15	20	0
21	(Switzerland) Simon Trummer	Ret	15	0
22	(Colombia) Julián Leal	16	21	0
23	(United Kingdom) Max Chilton	Ret	16	0
24	(Romania) Mihai Marinescu	17	Ret	0
25	(Czech Republic) Jan Charouz	Ret	17	0
26	(Monaco) Stéphane Richelmi	19	18	0
Pos	Driver	R1	R2	Points

=== Teams' Championship ===
Pos	Team	No.	R1	R2	Points
1	(United Kingdom) iSport International	9	6	3	17
1	(United Kingdom) iSport International	10	4	2	17
2	(Spain) Racing Engineering	7	1	10	13
2	(Spain) Racing Engineering	8	9	19	13
3	(France) Lotus ART	5	8	1	9
3	(France) Lotus ART	6	21	5	9
4	(Malaysia) Caterham Team AirAsia	26	13	7	9
4	(Malaysia) Caterham Team AirAsia	27	2	8	9
5	(Spain) Barwa Addax Team	3	Ret	14	9
5	(Spain) Barwa Addax Team	4	3	4	9
6	(Italy) Scuderia Coloni	18	5	6	5
6	(Italy) Scuderia Coloni	19	10	25^{†}	5
7	(Portugal) Ocean Racing Technology	22	14	22	2
7	(Portugal) Ocean Racing Technology	23	7	13	2
8	(Italy) Rapax	1	Ret	9	0
8	(Italy) Rapax	2	17	Ret	0
9	(United Kingdom) Super Nova Racing	16	11	23	0
9	(United Kingdom) Super Nova Racing	17	18	11	0
10	(France) DAMS	11	12	24	0
10	(France) DAMS	12	15	20	0
11	(United Kingdom) Arden International	14	20	12	0
11	(United Kingdom) Arden International	15	Ret	15	0
12	(United Kingdom) Carlin	24	Ret	16	0
12	(United Kingdom) Carlin	25	Ret	17	0
13	(Italy) Trident Racing	20	16	21	0
13	(Italy) Trident Racing	21	19	18	0
Pos	Team	No.	R1	R2	Points

Colour	Result
Gold	Winner
Silver	Second place
Bronze	Third place
Green	Points classification
Blue	Non-points classification
Blue	Non-classified finish (NC)
Purple	Retired, not classified (Ret)
Red	Did not qualify (DNQ)
Red	Did not pre-qualify (DNPQ)
Black	Disqualified (DSQ)
White	Did not start (DNS)
White	Withdrew (WD)
White	Race cancelled (C)
Blank	Did not practice (DNP)
Blank	Did not arrive (DNA)
Blank	Excluded (EX)

Previous round: 2011 Monza GP2 Series round	GP2 Series; 2011 season	Next round: 2012 Sepang GP2 Series round
Previous round: 2011 Yas Marina Circuit GP2 Asia Series round	Abu Dhabi GP2 round	Next round: 2013 Yas Marina GP2 Series round
