= 2009 International Formula Master =

Seasons
- ← 2008 none →

The 2009 International Formula Master was the third and last International Formula Master season. The season consisted of eight double-header events, beginning on May 16 at Pau and ending on September 20 at Imola. The series supported the World Touring Car Championship at all European rounds except the Race of Portugal, and supported Formula One at the Hungarian Grand Prix and at the Belgian Grand Prix. Fabio Leimer claimed the title for Jenzer Motorsport, winning his seventh race of the season at Motorsport Arena Oschersleben.

== Prize Tests ==
Like the previous season, the top drivers in the International Formula Master series standings at the end of the year will be awarded with a wide range of prize tests in various other racing categories.

As champion, Fabio Leimer received a GP2 Series test with French team DAMS, with Leimer, Sergey Afanasyev and Josef Král all earning the chance to use the chassis simulator of Formula One team Red Bull Racing for a day.

In addition, tests have also been confirmed with Indy Lights team Sam Schmidt Motorsports and with the Chevrolet Cruze used in the World Touring Car Championship.

== Teams and drivers ==
R = Series rookie for 2009

Team	No	Driver	Status	Rounds
(Italy) JD Motorsport	1	(Bulgaria) Vladimir Arabadzhiev		All
(Italy) JD Motorsport	2	(Russia) Sergey Afanasyev		All
(Italy) JD Motorsport	3	(Czech Republic) Josef Král		All
(Italy) Trident Racing	5	(Italy) Frankie Provenzano		1
(Italy) Cram Competition	5	(Italy) Frankie Provenzano		2, 6–8
(Italy) Cram Competition	4	(Portugal) Tiago Petiz	R	4–8
(Italy) Cram Competition	10	(Latvia) Harald Schlegelmilch		1
(Italy) Cram Competition	12	(Italy) Matteo Davenia	R	3
(Italy) Cram Competition	47	(Russia) Alessandro Kouzkin	R	1–5
(Switzerland) Jenzer Motorsport	6	(Switzerland) Fabio Leimer		All
(Switzerland) Jenzer Motorsport	7	(Norway) Pål Varhaug	R	All
(Switzerland) Jenzer Motorsport	26	(Switzerland) Nicolas Maulini		2–3, 6, 8
(Switzerland) Iris Project	8	(Switzerland) Simon Trummer		All
(Switzerland) Iris Project	9	(Italy) Patrick Reiterer	R	All
(Italy) ADM Motorsport	10	(Latvia) Harald Schlegelmilch		2
(Italy) ADM Motorsport	14	(New Zealand) Earl Bamber		1–2
(Italy) ADM Motorsport	15	(Italy) Marcello Puglisi		1
(United Kingdom) Hitech Junior Team	16	(United States) Alexander Rossi	R	1–2
(United Kingdom) Hitech Junior Team	24	(Denmark) Kasper Andersen		1–3
(Czech Republic) ISR Racing	16	(United States) Alexander Rossi	R	3–8
(Czech Republic) ISR Racing	20	(Czech Republic) Erik Janiš		3–8
(United Kingdom) Team JVA	29	(United Kingdom) Jonathan Kennard	R	1
(United Kingdom) Team JVA	30	(United Kingdom) Duncan Tappy	R	1
(Netherlands) AR Motorsport	31	(Netherlands) Kelvin Snoeks	R	All
(Netherlands) AR Motorsport	32	(Netherlands) Dennis Retera	R	1–3
(Netherlands) AR Motorsport	33	(Netherlands) Paul Meijer	R	5
IFM Talent Support Program	40	(United Kingdom) Alexander Sims		5–6
IFM Talent Support Program	41	(Italy) Samuele Buttarelli		5–6
IFM Talent Support Program	42	(New Zealand) Earl Bamber		5
IFM Talent Support Program	43	(Italy) Andrea Roda		6
IFM Talent Support Program	44	(United Kingdom) Edwin Jowsey		6

== Race calendar ==
Round		Location	Circuit	Date	Pole position	Fastest lap	Winning driver	Winning team
1	R1	Pau, France	Pau Circuit	16 May	(Switzerland) Fabio Leimer	(Switzerland) Fabio Leimer	(Switzerland) Fabio Leimer	(Switzerland) Jenzer Motorsport
1	R2	Pau, France	Pau Circuit	17 May		(Switzerland) Fabio Leimer	(Russia) Alessandro Kouzkin	(Italy) Cram Competition
2	R1	Valencia, Spain	Circuit de Valencia	30 May	(Switzerland) Fabio Leimer	(Switzerland) Fabio Leimer	(Switzerland) Fabio Leimer	(Switzerland) Jenzer Motorsport
2	R2	Valencia, Spain	Circuit de Valencia	31 May		(Czech Republic) Josef Král	(Denmark) Kasper Andersen	(United Kingdom) Hitech Junior Team
3	R1	Brno, Czech Republic	Masaryk Circuit	20 June	(Norway) Pål Varhaug	(Switzerland) Fabio Leimer	(Switzerland) Fabio Leimer	(Switzerland) Jenzer Motorsport
3	R2	Brno, Czech Republic	Masaryk Circuit	21 June		(United States) Alexander Rossi	(United States) Alexander Rossi	(Czech Republic) ISR Racing
4	R1	(United Kingdom) Kent, UK	Brands Hatch	18 July	(Switzerland) Fabio Leimer	(Switzerland) Fabio Leimer	(Switzerland) Fabio Leimer	(Switzerland) Jenzer Motorsport
4	R2	(United Kingdom) Kent, UK	Brands Hatch	19 July		(Switzerland) Fabio Leimer	(Russia) Alessandro Kouzkin	(Italy) Cram Competition
5	R1	Mogyoród, Hungary	Hungaroring	25 July	(Czech Republic) Josef Král	(Czech Republic) Josef Král	(Czech Republic) Josef Král	(Italy) JD Motorsport
5	R2	Mogyoród, Hungary	Hungaroring	26 July		(Russia) Sergey Afanasyev	(Russia) Sergey Afanasyev	(Italy) JD Motorsport
6	R1	Spa, Belgium	Circuit de Spa-Francorchamps	29 August	(Switzerland) Fabio Leimer	(Switzerland) Fabio Leimer	(Switzerland) Fabio Leimer	(Switzerland) Jenzer Motorsport
6	R2	Spa, Belgium	Circuit de Spa-Francorchamps	30 August		(Switzerland) Fabio Leimer	(United States) Alexander Rossi	(Czech Republic) ISR Racing
7	R1	Oschersleben, Germany	Motorsport Arena Oschersleben	5 September	(Switzerland) Fabio Leimer	(Switzerland) Fabio Leimer	(Switzerland) Fabio Leimer	(Switzerland) Jenzer Motorsport
7	R2	Oschersleben, Germany	Motorsport Arena Oschersleben	6 September		(Switzerland) Fabio Leimer	(Czech Republic) Josef Král	(Italy) JD Motorsport
8	R1	Imola, Italy	Autodromo Enzo e Dino Ferrari	19 September	(Switzerland) Fabio Leimer	(Switzerland) Fabio Leimer	(Switzerland) Fabio Leimer	(Switzerland) Jenzer Motorsport
8	R2	Imola, Italy	Autodromo Enzo e Dino Ferrari	20 September		(Switzerland) Fabio Leimer	(United States) Alexander Rossi	(Czech Republic) ISR Racing

== Championship Standings ==
- Points for both championships were awarded as follows:

Race
Position	1st	2nd	3rd	4th	5th	6th	7th	8th
**Race One**	10	8	6	5	4	3	2	1
**Race Two**	6	5	4	3	2	1		

In addition:

- One point was awarded for Pole position for Race One
- One point was awarded for fastest lap in each race

=== Drivers ===
Pos	Driver	PAU (France)		VAL (Spain)		BRN (Czech Republic)		BRH (United Kingdom)		HUN (Hungary)		SPA (Belgium)		OSC (Germany)		IMO (Italy)		Pts
1	(Switzerland) Fabio Leimer	**1**	7	**1**	6	1	6	**1**	7	2	5	**1**	2	**1**	11	**1**	11	106
2	(Russia) Sergey Afanasyev	Ret	9	Ret	3	4	3	3	3	7	1	2	4	2	4	2	3	68
3	(Czech Republic) Josef Král	Ret	13	2	4	3	DSQ	2	5	**1**	Ret	7	Ret	6	1	4	2	62
4	(United States) Alexander Rossi	10	4	7	12	7	1	7	2	3	Ret	5	1	4	7	5	1	52
5	(Norway) Pål Varhaug	3	3	4	2	**2**	Ret	4	6	11	12	8	5	5	3	Ret	6	49
6	(Czech Republic) Erik Janiš					5	4	5	4	8	3	4	3	3	6	7	4	42
7	(Bulgaria) Vladimir Arabadzhiev	2	Ret	3	5	6	2	9	8	15	8	14	7	8	2	3	7	37
8	(Russia) Alessandro Kouzkin	4	1	NC	Ret	11	7	8	1	Ret	10							18
9	(Italy) Patrick Reiterer	Ret	Ret	5	Ret	Ret	10	6	11	9	7	15	Ret	Ret	Ret	6	5	16
10	(Denmark) Kasper Andersen	Ret	11	6	1	9	5											11
11	(Switzerland) Simon Trummer	Ret	8	Ret	Ret	13	11	Ret	9	13	Ret	3	8	7	5	8	12	11
12	(Netherlands) Paul Meijer									6	2							10
13	(Netherlands) Dennis Retera	8	2	DNS	11	10	8											6
14	(United Kingdom) Jonathan Kennard	5	Ret															4
15	(Italy) Frankie Provenzano	7	Ret	Ret	9							12	6	10	9	Ret	Ret	3
16	(Latvia) Harald Schlegelmilch	6	Ret	Ret	8													3
17	(Switzerland) Nicolas Maulini			8	7	8	Ret					9	12			9	8	3
18	(New Zealand) Earl Bamber	11	5	Ret	10					5	6							2
19	(Italy) Marcello Puglisi	Ret	6															1
20	(Netherlands) Kelvin Snoeks	Ret	12	NC	13	12	9	11	Ret	14	Ret	11	Ret	9	8	Ret	9	0
21	(Portugal) Tiago Petiz							10	10	12	11	10	9	11	10	10	10	0
22	(United Kingdom) Duncan Tappy	9	10															0
23	(Italy) Matteo Davenia					14	12											0
guest drivers ineligible for championship points
	(United Kingdom) Alexander Sims									4	4	6	Ret					0
	(Italy) Samuele Buttarelli									10	9	Ret	10					0
	(United Kingdom) Edwin Jowsey											Ret	11					0
	(Italy) Andrea Roda											13	Ret					0
Pos	Driver	PAU (France)		VAL (Spain)		BRN (Czech Republic)		BRH (United Kingdom)		HUN (Hungary)		SPA (Belgium)		OSC (Germany)		IMO (Italy)		Pts

Colour	Result
Gold	Winner
Silver	Second place
Bronze	Third place
Green	Points classification
Blue	Non-points classification
Blue	Non-classified finish (NC)
Purple	Retired, not classified (Ret)
Red	Did not qualify (DNQ)
Red	Did not pre-qualify (DNPQ)
Black	Disqualified (DSQ)
White	Did not start (DNS)
White	Withdrew (WD)
White	Race cancelled (C)
Blank	Did not practice (DNP)
Blank	Did not arrive (DNA)
Blank	Excluded (EX)

**Bold** – Pole
Italics – Fastest Lap

=== Teams ===
Pos	Team	PAU (France)		VAL (Spain)		BRN (Czech Republic)		BRH (United Kingdom)		HUN (Hungary)		SPA (Belgium)		OSC (Germany)		IMO (Italy)		Pts
1	(Italy) JD Motorsport	2	9	2	3	3	2	2	3	1	1	2	4	2	1	2	2	149
1	(Italy) JD Motorsport	Ret	13	3	4	4	3	3	5	7	8	7	7	6	2	3	3	149
2	(Switzerland) Jenzer Motorsport	1	3	1	2	1	6	1	6	2	5	1	2	1	3	1	6	138
2	(Switzerland) Jenzer Motorsport	3	7	4	6	2	Ret	4	7	11	12	8	5	5	11	9	8	138
3	(Czech Republic) ISR Racing					5	1	5	2	3	3	4	1	3	6	5	1	93
3	(Czech Republic) ISR Racing					7	4	7	4	8	Ret	5	3	4	7	7	4	93
4	(Switzerland) Iris Project	Ret	8	5	Ret	13	10	6	8	9	7	3	8	7	5	6	5	30
4	(Switzerland) Iris Project	Ret	Ret	Ret	Ret	Ret	11	Ret	11	13	Ret	15	Ret	Ret	Ret	8	12	30
5	(Italy) Cram Competition	4	1	NC	9	11	7	8	1	12	10	10	6	10	9	10	10	23
5	(Italy) Cram Competition	6	Ret	Ret	Ret	14	12	10	10	Ret	11	12	9	11	10	Ret	Ret	23
6	(United Kingdom) Hitech Junior Team	10	4	6	1	9	5											18
6	(United Kingdom) Hitech Junior Team	Ret	11	7	12													18
7	(Netherlands) AR Motorsport	8	2	NC	11	10	8	11	Ret	6	2	11	Ret	9	8	Ret	9	18
7	(Netherlands) AR Motorsport	Ret	12	DNS	13	12	9			14	Ret							18
8	(Italy) ADM Motorsport	11	5	Ret	8													4
8	(Italy) ADM Motorsport	Ret	6	Ret	10													4
9	(United Kingdom) Team JVA	5	10															4
9	(United Kingdom) Team JVA	9	Ret															4
10	(Italy) Trident Racing	7	Ret															2
guest teams ineligible for championship points
	IFM Talent Support Program									4	4	6	10					0
	IFM Talent Support Program									5	6	13	11					0
Pos	Team	PAU (France)		VAL (Spain)		BRN (Czech Republic)		BRH (United Kingdom)		HUN (Hungary)		SPA (Belgium)		OSC (Germany)		IMO (Italy)		Pts

Colour	Result
Gold	Winner
Silver	Second place
Bronze	Third place
Green	Points classification
Blue	Non-points classification
Blue	Non-classified finish (NC)
Purple	Retired, not classified (Ret)
Red	Did not qualify (DNQ)
Red	Did not pre-qualify (DNPQ)
Black	Disqualified (DSQ)
White	Did not start (DNS)
White	Withdrew (WD)
White	Race cancelled (C)
Blank	Did not practice (DNP)
Blank	Did not arrive (DNA)
Blank	Excluded (EX)
