= Frankie Provenzano =

Italian racing driver (born 1986)

Francesco Provenzano
- Nationality: (Italy) Italian
- Born: 12 February 1986 (age 40) Rome, Italy

International Formula Master career
- Debut season: 2007
- Current team: Cram Competition
- Categorisation: FIA Silver (until 2026); FIA Bronze (2027–)
- Car number: 5
- Former teams: ADM Motorsport; Trident Racing
- Starts: 38
- Wins: 0
- Poles: 0
- Fastest laps: 0
- Best finish: 15th in 2009

Previous series
- 2009 2008–09 2006 2006 2006 2006: World Series by Renault; GP2 Asia Series; FR2.0 Italia Winter Series; Formula Renault 2.0 Italia; Eurocup Formula Renault 2.0; Euroseries 3000

Francesco Provenzano (born 12 February 1986 in Rome) is an Italian former racing driver.

== Career ==
=== Formula Renault ===
Provenzano began his formula racing career with the BVM Minardi team in Italian Formula Renault, finishing second to Jaime Alguersuari in the 2006 Winter Series – finishing three of the four races on the podium. This was after he failed to score any points in the main championship; his best finish was 13th at Spa. He also competed in two races of the 2006 Formula Renault Eurocup.

=== Formula 3000 ===
Provenzano also competed in two races of the 2006 Euroseries 3000 championship, driving for a team backed by former Formula One entrants Coloni. He did not score any points, ending up with a tenth-place finish and a retirement in the two races at Vallelunga.

=== International Formula Master ===
Provenzano moved to the newly created International Formula Master series for 2007, driving for the ADM Motorsport team. He finished twentieth overall in that year, amassing seven points at the Brands Hatch meeting with a fifth and sixth. Provenzano did somewhat better in the concurrent Formula Master Italia championship by taking third place in the championship. He remained in the series for 2008, but could not improve on his previous 20th position in the championship.

=== A1 Grand Prix ===
Provenzano took part in the British round of the 2007–08 A1 Grand Prix season as a rookie driver for A1 Team Italy. This meant that he took part in an extra practice session prior to the event, before handing the car back to regular driver Edoardo Piscopo for the remainder of the weekend.

=== GP2 Series ===
Over the winter of 2008–2009, Provenzano was signed by the Trident Racing team to compete in the third round of the 2008–09 GP2 Asia Series season. He replaced previous incumbent Alberto Valerio in the seat, and was partnered by Adrián Vallés, who also made his début for Trident at the same time. Provenzano was himself replaced by Ricardo Teixeira after four races.

=== World Series by Renault ===
Provenzano was then signed by Prema Powerteam for a 2009 campaign in the World Series by Renault, partnering Omar Leal. However, he left the team after the second round, and returned to International Formula Master.

== Racing record ==
=== Career summary ===
Season	Series	Team name	Races	Poles	Wins	Points	Position
2006	Formula Renault 2.0 Italia	BVM Minardi	12	0	0	0	NC
2006	Formula Renault 2.0 Italia Winter Series	BVM Minardi	4	0	0	102	**2nd**
2006	Eurocup Formula Renault 2.0	BVM Racing	2	0	0	0	NC
2006	Euroseries 3000	Coloni Rookies Team	2	0	0	0	21st
2007	International Formula Master	ADM Motorsport	12	0	0	7	20th
2007	Formula Master Italia	ADM Motorsport	8	1	0	54	**3rd**
2008	International Formula Master	ADM Motorsport	16	0	0	7	20th
2008–09	GP2 Asia Series	Trident Racing	4	0	0	0	35th
2009	World Series by Renault	Prema Powerteam	4	0	0	0	31st
2009	International Formula Master	Trident Racing	10	0	0	3	15th
2009	International Formula Master	Cram Competition	10	0	0	3	15th

=== Complete Eurocup Formula Renault 2.0 results ===
(key) (Races in bold indicate pole position; races in italics indicate fastest lap)

Year	Entrant	1	2	3	4	5	6	7	8	9	10	11	12	13	14	DC	Points
2006	BVM Racing	ZOL; 1	ZOL; 2	IST; 1	IST; 2	MIS; 1	MIS; 2	NÜR; 1; 24	NÜR; 2; 17	DON; 1	DON; 2	LMS; 1	LMS; 2	CAT; 1	CAT; 2	NC†	0

† As Provenzano was a guest driver, he was ineligible for points

=== Complete Formula Renault 3.5 Series results ===
(key) (Races in bold indicate pole position) (Races in italics indicate fastest lap)

Year	Team	1	2	3	4	5	6	7	8	9	10	11	12	13	14	15	16	17	Pos	Points
2009	Prema Powerteam	CAT; 1 Ret	CAT; 2; 15	SPA; 1; 16	SPA; 2; 13	MON; 1	HUN; 1	HUN; 2	SIL; 1	SIL; 2	BUG; 1	BUG; 2	ALG; 1	ALG; 2	NÜR; 1	NÜR; 2	ALC; 1	ALC; 2	31st	0

=== Complete GP2 Asia series results ===
(key) (Races in bold indicate pole position) (Races in italics indicate fastest lap)

Year	Entrant	1	2	3	4	5	6	7	8	9	10	11	12	DC	Points
2008–09	Trident Racing	CHN; FEA	CHN; SPR	UAE; FEA	UAE; SPR	BHR; FEA; 15	BHR; SPR; 15	QAT; FEA; 19	QAT; SPR; 20	MAL; FEA	MAL; SPR	BHR; FEA	BHR; SPR	35th	0
