= Fabio Leimer =

Swiss racing driver (born 1989)

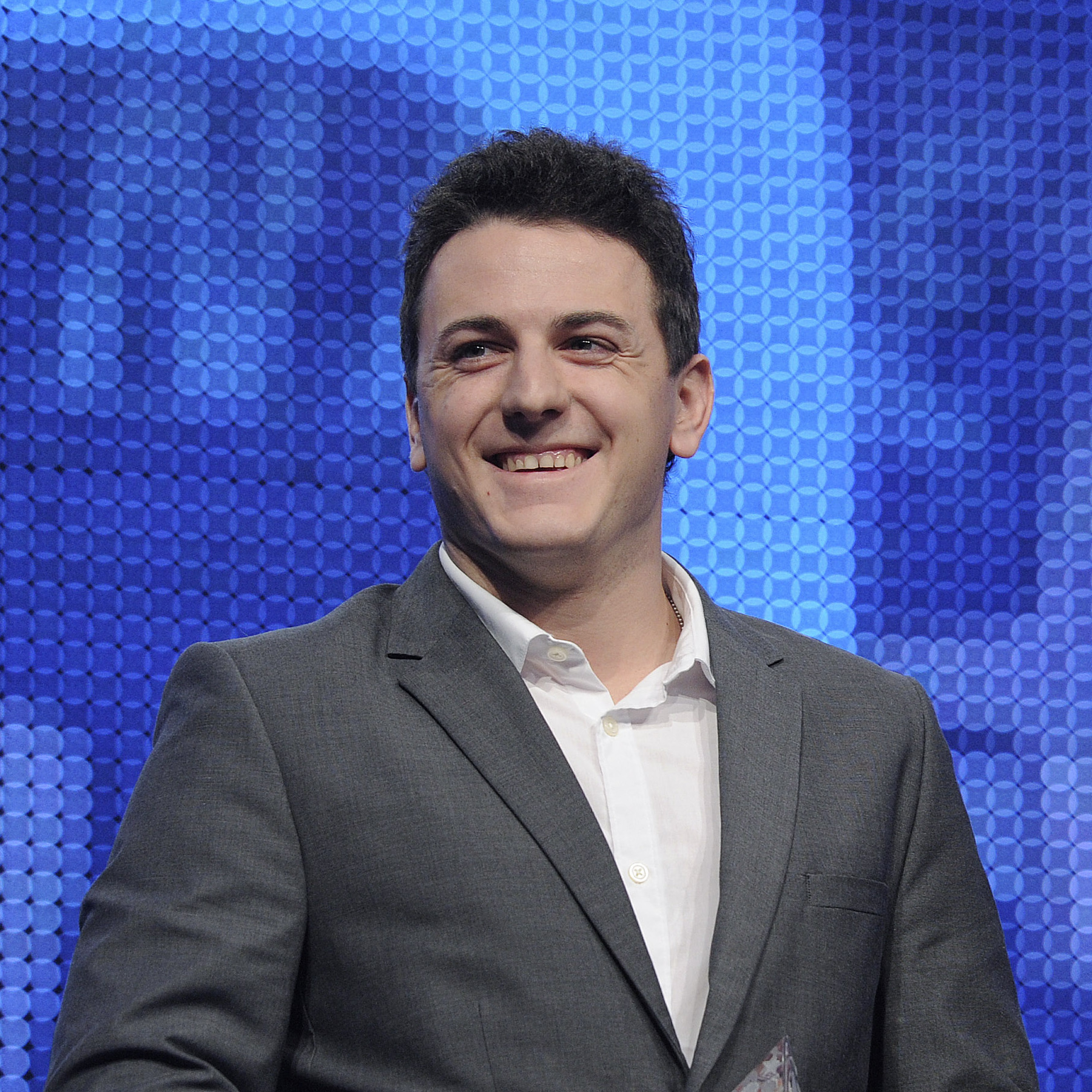
- Leimer in 2013
- Nationality: (Switzerland) Swiss
- Born: 17 April 1989 (age 37) Rothrist, Switzerland

GP2 Series career
- Debut season: 2010
- Current team: Racing Engineering
- Categorisation: FIA Platinum
- Car number: 8
- Former teams: Ocean Racing Technology; Rapax
- Starts: 63
- Wins: 5
- Poles: 2
- Fastest laps: 4
- Best finish: 1st in 2013

Previous series
- 2009–10–2011 2008–09 2008 2007 2007 2006: GP2 Asia Series; International Formula Master; Formula Master Italia; Formula Renault 2.0 Italia; Eurocup Formula Renault 2.0; Formula BMW ADAC

Championship titles
- 2017 2013 2009: Ferrari Challenge – Finali Mondiali (Pro); GP2 Series; International Formula Master

Fabio Leimer (born 17 April 1989) is a former professional racing driver from Switzerland. He is best known for winning the 2013 GP2 Series.

== Career ==
=== Karting ===
Like many of today's racing drivers, Rothrist-born Leimer started his career in karting back in 2003, when he won the Swiss Junior Championship. He finished runner-up in the same category the following season before finishing second in the Swiss Championship ICA in 2006.

=== Formula BMW ===
In 2006, Leimer graduated to single-seater racing, competing in the Formula BMW ADAC series in Germany. He started the year with Team Rosberg, but finished the season with a different team, Matson Motorsport. During the year, he accumulated four points to be classified 18th in the standings. He also competed in the end-of-season Formula BMW World Final, held in Valencia, where he finished in 19th place.

=== Formula Renault ===
The following year, Leimer moved up to Formula Renault, racing in both the Eurocup Formula Renault 2.0 and Italian Formula Renault 2.0 championships for Jenzer Motorsport.

In the Eurocup series, Leimer scored points in three races and took a single fastest lap at Donington Park to end the year in seventeenth place.

In the Italian championship, Leimer scored points in eleven of the fourteen races and took two podium places (at Spa-Francorchamps and Valencia) to be classified eleventh in the standings.

=== International Formula Master ===
In 2008, Leimer progressed to the International Formula Master series, once again racing with Jenzer Motorsport. In a very successful debut season, he finished as runner-up to champion Chris van der Drift, taking three race wins at Estoril, Imola and Monza along with five other podium places. He also helped Jenzer Motorsport finish third in the teams' standings. In the accompanying Formula Master Italia series, Leimer finished in fourth place with one race win (at Mugello) from two starts.

In October 2008, Leimer took part in a three-day Indy Lights prize test with Sam Schmidt Motorsports. The prize test was originally awarded to German driver Michael Ammermüller, but he declined it for personal reasons.

Leimer continued in the series for 2009, partnering Pål Varhaug, the reigning Italian Formula Renault 2.0 champion. During the first six rounds of the season, he took race wins in Pau, Valencia, Brno, Brands Hatch and Spa-Francorchamps, the latter event supporting the 2009 Belgian Grand Prix. Leimer then sealed the title with his sixth win of the season, at the seventh round in Oschersleben.

=== GP2 Series ===
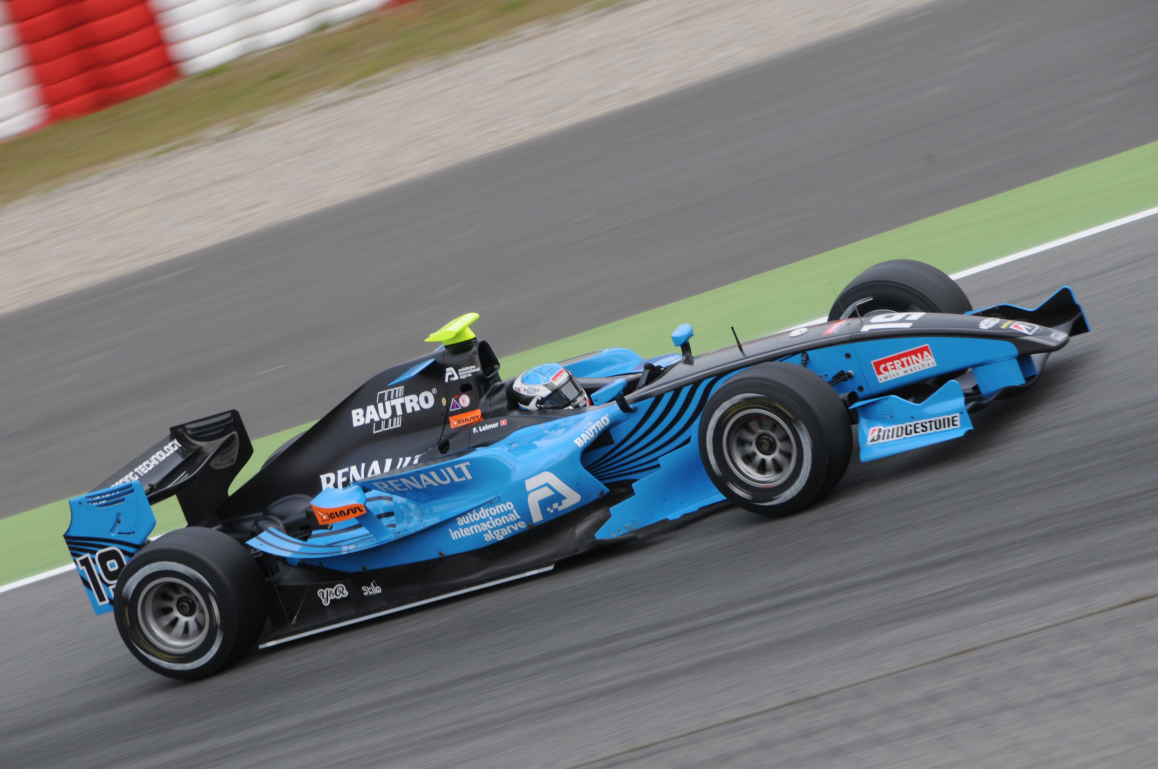
Leimer won the opening sprint race of the 2010 GP2 Series season in Barcelona.

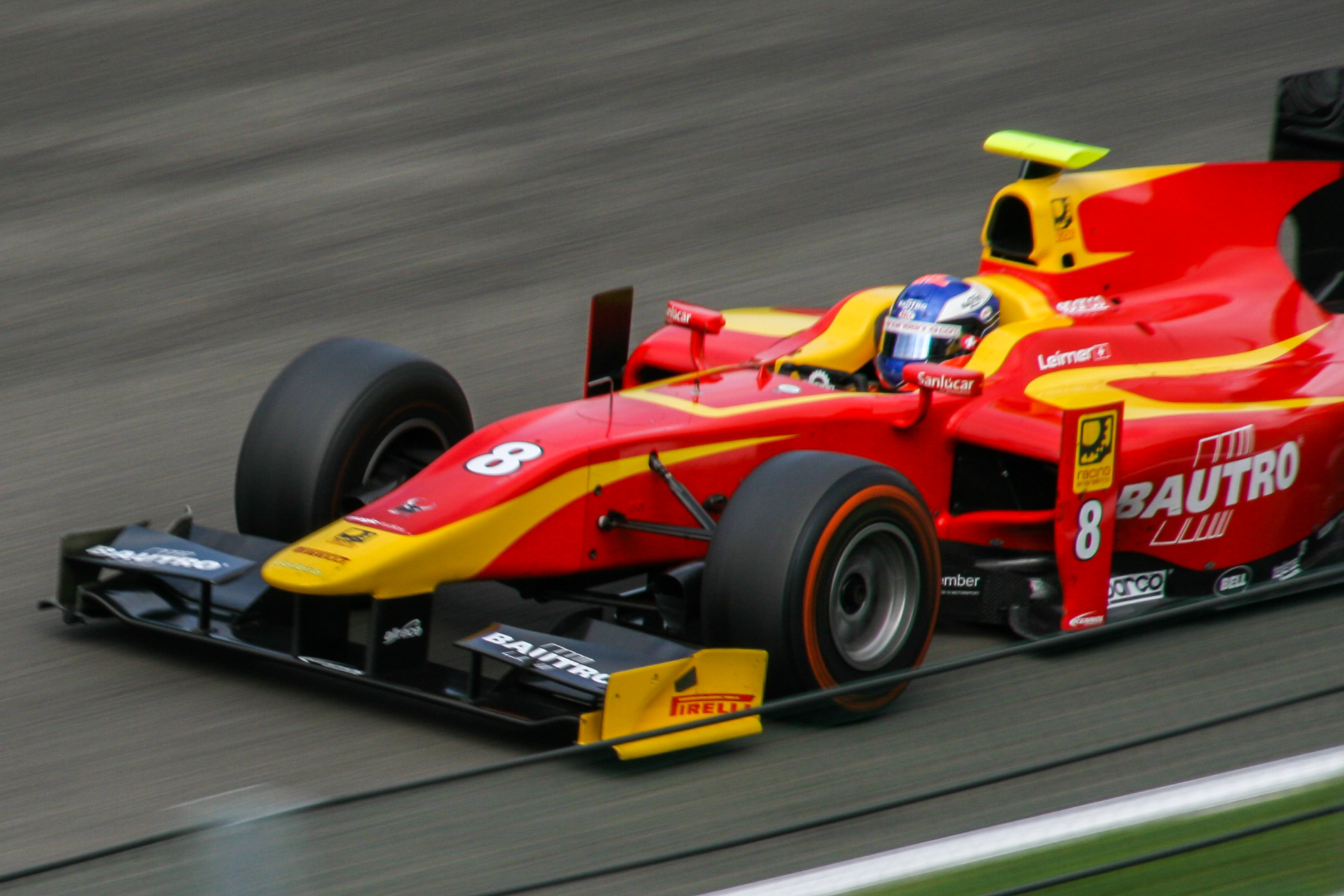
Leimer drove for the Racing Engineering team during his title-winning 2013 season.

As a result of finishing championship runner-up in the 2008 Formula Master season, in November of that year, Leimer took part in a prize GP2 test with Italian team Trident Racing at the Paul Ricard circuit in France, and a year later he tested with the DAMS team at the same venue as a prize for winning the Formula Master title.

In October 2009, Leimer tested with Tiago Monteiro's Ocean Racing Technology team at Jerez and later that month he was confirmed as a driver for the team in the 2009–10 GP2 Asia Series season, racing alongside fellow Formula Master graduate Alexander Rossi, and former British Formula 3 driver Max Chilton. Leimer continued with the team into the 2010 GP2 Series, and was partnered by Chilton. At the first round of the season in Barcelona, Leimer finished eighth in the feature race, a result which gave him pole position for the reverse grid sprint event which he won from the Rapax Team entry of Luiz Razia. However, he did not score any further points, limiting himself to 19th place in the drivers' championship.

For 2011, Leimer moved to the Rapax team alongside Julián Leal. He finished fifth overall in the Asia series, and then proceeded to take his second category win in the main series. As was the case the previous year, the victory came in the sprint race at the Catalunya circuit, and he again set the fastest lap in the process, although on this occasion he owed his reverse-grid pole position to Romain Grosjean's disqualification from the feature race. Another haul of points at Monza saw him improve to 14th position in the championship standings. He also won the feature race of the non-championship event held at the Yas Marina Circuit. Leimer switched to the Racing Engineering team for 2012, where he partnered Nathanaël Berthon. Despite failing to win a race during the season, his improved consistency, consisting of six podium finishes, saw him improve to seventh place in the drivers' championship. Leimer took the GP2 driver's championship title in 2013, with seven podium finishes and three wins.

=== FIA World Endurance Championship ===
In 2014, Leimer joined the Swiss team Rebellion Racing for the FIA World Endurance Championship after testing for the team at the pre-season "Prologue". This was Leimer's first experience driving sports cars.

=== Super Formula ===
Leimer planned to race at the Japanese Super Formula in 2015, driving a Team Mugen's Honda-powered car. However, on 7 March 2015, it was announced that Leimer's contract with Mugen had been prematurely terminated due to financial issues.

=== Formula One ===
On 3 June 2015, the Manor Marussia F1 Team announced that they have signed Leimer as the official team reserve for 2015 and would participate in FP1 sessions at Grand Prix throughout the season. He participated in only one FP1 session, at the Hungarian Grand Prix.

=== Formula E ===
On 23 June 2015, Virgin Racing announced Leimer to be their driver to replace Jaime Alguersuari for the final two rounds, 10 and 11, at London after Alguersuari was suspended from racing due to minor health issues. Race 10 saw him qualify 19th and finish the race in 14th position. The final round saw him qualify 17th, but he crashed out of the race. Leimer finished the season without scoring a point and finished 32nd out of 35 in the championship.

== Racing record ==
=== Career summary ===
Season	Series	Team	Races	Wins	Poles	F/Laps	Podiums	Points	Position
2006	Formula BMW ADAC	Team Rosberg	18	0	0	0	0	4	18th
2006	Formula BMW ADAC	Matson Motorsport	18	0	0	0	0	4	18th
2007	Eurocup Formula Renault 2.0	Jenzer Motorsport	14	0	0	1	0	17	17th
2007	Italian Formula Renault 2.0	Jenzer Motorsport	14	0	0	0	2	161	11th
2008	International Formula Master	Jenzer Motorsport	16	3	1	3	8	79	**2nd**
2008	Formula Master Italia	Jenzer Motorsport	2	1	1	2	1	48	4th
2009	International Formula Master	Jenzer Motorsport	16	7	6	12	9	106	**1st**
2009–10	GP2 Asia Series	Ocean Racing Technology	7	0	0	0	0	0	31st
2010	GP2 Series	Ocean Racing Technology	20	1	0	1	1	8	19th
2011	GP2 Series	Rapax	18	1	0	1	2	15	14th
2011	GP2 Asia Series	Rapax	4	0	0	0	1	9	5th
2011	GP2 Final	Racing Engineering	2	1	1	1	1	13	**1st**
2012	GP2 Series	Racing Engineering	24	0	1	2	6	152	7th
2013	GP2 Series	Racing Engineering	22	3	1	1	7	201	**1st**
2014	FIA World Endurance Championship - LMP1	Rebellion Racing	8	0	0	0	0	19	17th
2014	24 Hours of Le Mans - LMP1	Rebellion Racing	1	0	0	0	0	N/A	NC
2014–15	Formula E	Virgin Racing	2	0	0	0	0	0	32nd
2014–15	Formula E	Amlin Aguri	Test driver						
2015	Formula One	Manor Marussia F1 Team	Test driver						
2016	Ferrari Challenge Europe – Trofeo Pirelli (Pro)	Octane126	6	1	4	2	5	89	5th
2017	Ferrari Challenge Europe – Trofeo Pirelli (Pro)	Octane126	8	1	0	1	6	105.5	6th
2017	24H Series - A6	Octane126							

=== Complete Formula BMW ADAC results ===
(key) (Races in bold indicate pole position) (Races in italics indicate fastest lap)

Year	Entrant	1	2	3	4	5	6	7	8	9	10	11	12	13	14	15	16	17	18	DC	Points
2006	Team Rosberg	HOC1; 1; 13	HOC1; 2; 17	LAU; 1; 14	LAU; 2; 15	NÜR1; 1 Ret	NÜR1; 2; 15	OSC1; 1; 8	OSC1; 2 Ret	OSC2; 1; 14	OSC2; 2; 10	NOR; 1; 17	NOR; 2; 12							19th	4
2006	Matson Motorsport													NÜR2; 1; 17	NÜR2; 2; 15	ZAN; 1; 11	ZAN; 2; 15	HOC2; 1; 16	HOC2; 2; 14	19th	4

=== Complete Formula Renault 2.0 Italia results ===
(key) (Races in bold indicate pole position) (Races in italics indicate fastest lap)

Year	Entrant	1	2	3	4	5	6	7	8	9	10	11	12	13	14	DC	Points
2007	Jenzer Motorsport	VLL1; 1 Ret	VLL1; 2; 13	VLL2; 1; 12	VLL2; 2; 15	SPA; 1; 4	SPA; 2; 3	VAL; 1; 5	VAL; 2; 2	MIS; 1; 8	MIS; 2; 7	MUG; 1; 13	MUG; 2 Ret	MNZ; 1; 5	MNZ; 2 Ret	11th	161

=== Complete Eurocup Formula Renault 2.0 results ===
(key) (Races in bold indicate pole position) (Races in italics indicate fastest lap)

Year	Entrant	1	2	3	4	5	6	7	8	9	10	11	12	13	14	DC	Points
2007	Jenzer Motorsport	ZOL; 1; 18	ZOL; 2; 12	NÜR; 1; 12	NÜR; 2; 7	HUN; 1; 19	HUN; 2; 19	DON; 1; 7	DON; 2 Ret	MAG; 1; 5	MAG; 2; 28†	EST; 1; 16	EST; 2; 24	CAT; 1; 21	CAT; 2; 32	17th	17

=== Complete International Formula Master results ===
(key) (Races in bold indicate pole position) (Races in italics indicate fastest lap)

Year	Entrant	1	2	3	4	5	6	7	8	9	10	11	12	13	14	15	16	DC	Points	Ref
2008	Jenzer Motorsport	VAL; 1; 4	VAL; 2; 3	PAU; 1 Ret	PAU; 2; 18	BRN; 1; 4	BRN; 2; 13	**EST**; **1**; 1	EST; 2; 7	BRH; 1; 13	BRH; 2; 8	OSC; 1; 2	OSC; 2; 2	IMO; 1; 1	IMO; 2; 3	MNZ; 1; 1	MNZ; 2; 2	2nd	79	
2009	Jenzer Motorsport	**PAU**; **1**; 1	PAU; 2; 7	**VAL**; **1**; 1	VAL; 2; 6	BRN; 1; 1	BRN; 2; 6	**BRH**; **1**; 1	BRH; 2; 7	HUN; 1; 2	HUN; 2; 5	**SPA**; **1**; 1	SPA; 2; 2	**OSC**; **1**; 1	OSC; 2; 11	**IMO**; **1**; 1	IMO; 2; 11	1st	106	

=== Complete GP2 Series results ===
(key) (Races in bold indicate pole position) (Races in italics indicate fastest lap)

Year	Entrant	1	2	3	4	5	6	7	8	9	10	11	12	13	14	15	16	17	18	19	20	21	22	23	24	DC	Points
2010	Ocean Racing Technology	CAT; FEA; 8	CAT; SPR; 1	MON; FEA; Ret	MON; SPR; 17	IST; FEA; 13	IST; SPR; 15	VAL; FEA; Ret	VAL; SPR; Ret	SIL; FEA; 17	SIL; SPR; 13	HOC; FEA; 21	HOC; SPR; Ret	HUN; FEA; Ret	HUN; SPR; 11	SPA; FEA; 12	SPA; SPR; Ret	MNZ; FEA; Ret	MNZ; SPR; DNS	YMC; FEA; Ret	YMC; SPR; 15					19th	8
2011	Rapax	IST; FEA; Ret	IST; SPR; 20	CAT; FEA; 8	CAT; SPR; 1	MON; FEA; 9	MON; SPR; 7	VAL; FEA; Ret	VAL; SPR; 14	SIL; FEA; 15	SIL; SPR; 11	NÜR; FEA; DSQ	NÜR; SPR; 8	HUN; FEA; 11	HUN; SPR; 11	SPA; FEA; Ret	SPA; SPR; Ret	MNZ; FEA; 7	MNZ; SPR; 2							14th	15
2012	Racing Engineering	SEP; FEA; 4	SEP; SPR; 6	BHR1; FEA; 7	BHR1; SPR; 12	BHR2; FEA; 2	BHR2; SPR; 8	CAT; FEA; 12	CAT; SPR; 11	MON; FEA; 18	MON; SPR; Ret	VAL; FEA; 4	VAL; SPR; 3	**SIL**; **FEA**; 14	SIL; SPR; 9	HOC; FEA; 2	HOC; SPR; 4	HUN; FEA; 9	HUN; SPR; 14	SPA; FEA; Ret	SPA; SPR; 5	MNZ; FEA; 5	MNZ; SPR; 2	MRN; FEA; 3	MRN; SPR; 3	7th	152
2013	Racing Engineering	SEP; FEA; 1	SEP; SPR; 12	**BHR**; **FEA**; 1	BHR; SPR; 9	CAT; FEA; 18	CAT; SPR; 9	MON; FEA; Ret	MON; SPR; 13	SIL; FEA; 4	SIL; SPR; 15	NÜR; FEA; 4	NÜR; SPR; 3	HUN; FEA; 4	HUN; SPR; 3	SPA; FEA; 4	SPA; SPR; 5	MNZ; FEA; 1	MNZ; SPR; 6	MRN; FEA; 5	MRN; SPR; 3	YMC; FEA; 4	YMC; SPR; 3			**1st**	**201**

==== Complete GP2 Asia Series results ====
(key) (Races in bold indicate pole position) (Races in italics indicate fastest lap)

Year	Entrant	1	2	3	4	5	6	7	8	DC	Points
2009–10	Ocean Racing Technology	YMC1; FEA; 17	YMC1; SPR; Ret	YMC2; FEA; Ret	YMC2; SPR; Ret	BHR1; FEA; 20	BHR1; SPR; 15	BHR2; FEA; Ret	BHR2; SPR; DNS	31st	0
2011	Rapax	YMC; FEA; 10	YMC; SPR; 6	IMO; FEA; 6	IMO; SPR; 2					5th	9

==== Complete GP2 Final results ====
(key) (Races in bold indicate pole position) (Races in italics indicate fastest lap)

Year	Entrant	1	2	DC	Points
2011	Racing Engineering	**YMC**; **FEA**; 1	YMC; SPR; 10	1st	13

=== Complete FIA World Endurance Championship results ===
Year	Entrant	Class	Chassis	Engine	1	2	3	4	5	6	7	8	Rank	Points
2014	Rebellion Racing	LMP1	Lola B12/60	Toyota (RV8KLM 3.4 L V8)	SIL; Ret	SPA; Ret	LMS; Ret	COA; Ret	FUJ; 10	SHA; 8	BHR; 6	SÃO; 7	17th	19

=== 24 Hours of Le Mans results ===
Year	Team	Co-Drivers	Car	Class	Laps	Pos.	Class Pos.
2014	(Switzerland) Rebellion Racing	(Austria) Dominik Kraihamer (Italy) Andrea Belicchi	Rebellion R-One-Toyota	LMP1-L	73	DNF	DNF

=== Complete Formula E results ===
(key) (Races in bold indicate pole position; races in italics indicate fastest lap)

Year	Team	Chassis	Powertrain	1	2	3	4	5	6	7	8	9	10	11	Pos	Points
2014–15	Virgin Racing	Spark SRT01-e	SRT01-e	BEI	PUT	PDE	BUE	MIA	LBH	MCO	BER	MSC	LDN; 14	LDN; Ret	32nd	0

=== Complete Formula One participations ===
(key) (Races in bold indicate pole position; races in italics indicate fastest lap)

Year	Entrant	Chassis	Engine	1	2	3	4	5	6	7	8	9	10	11	12	13	14	15	16	17	18	19	WDC	Points
2015	Manor Marussia F1 Team	Marussia MR03B	Ferrari 059/3 1.6 V6 t	AUS	MAL	CHN	BHR	ESP	MON	CAN	AUT	GBR	HUN; TD	BEL	ITA	SIN	JPN	RUS	USA	MEX	BRA	ABU	–	–

=== Ferrari Challenge Europe results ===
Year	Class	Team	1	2	3	4	5	6	7	8	9	10	11	12	13	14	Pos.	Points	Ref
2016	**Trofeo Pirelli Pro**	Octane126	MNZ; 1	MNZ; 2	MUG; 1	MUG; 2	LMS	**SOC**; **1**; 2	SOC; 2; 2	**HOC**; **1**; 1	**HOC**; **2**; 2	JER; 1	JER; 2	**DAY**; **1** DNS	DAY; 2; 2		5th	89	
2017	**Trofeo Pirelli Pro**	Octane126	VAL; 1; 1	VAL; 2; 2	MNZ; 1; 6	MNZ; 2; 3	HUN; 1; 4	HUN; 2; 2	LEC; 1	LEC; 2	SIL; 1	SIL; 2	IMO; 1	IMO; 2	MUG; 1; 2	MUG; 2; 2	6th	105.5	

=== Ferrari Challenge Finali Mondiali results ===
Year	Class	Team	Car	Circuit	Pos.	Ref
2016	**Trofeo Pirelli Pro**	(Switzerland) Octane126	Ferrari 458 Challenge Evo	(United States) Daytona International Speedway	20th	
2017	**Trofeo Pirelli Pro**	(Switzerland) Octane126	Ferrari 488 Challenge	(Italy) Mugello Circuit	**1st**	

Sporting positions
Preceded by Chris van der Drift	International Formula Master; Champion; 2009	Succeeded by Series folded
Preceded by Davide Valsecchi	GP2 Series; Champion; 2013	Succeeded by Jolyon Palmer
