= 2009 World Series by Renault =

Seasons
- ← 2008 2010 →

The 2009 World Series by Renault was the fifth season of Renault Sport's series of events, with three different championships racing under one banner. Consisting of the Formula Renault 3.5 Series, Eurocup Formula Renault 2.0 and the Eurocup Mégane Trophy, the World Series by Renault ran at seven different venues, where fans can get into the meetings for no cost whatsoever, such is the uniqueness of the series.

The series began on 18 April at the Circuit de Catalunya, just outside Barcelona and finished on 25 October at the Ciudad del Motor de Aragón in Alcañiz. The 2009 calendar featured two changes to the calendar from 2008, with Monza and Estoril being replaced by two new circuits in the Algarve and the season-ending round in Aragón. Catalunya moved to the season-opening round, having been the 2008 season finale. The series also visited Belgium, France, Hungary, Germany and the United Kingdom during the season, while Formula Renault 3.5 had two extra races on its own, in support of the Monaco Grand Prix in May, and also the 1000 km of Algarve in August.

== Review ==
=== Formula Renault 3.5 Series ===
The early pacesetter in the championship was Marcos Martínez of Pons Racing, scoring more points in the first two races than he did in the entire 2008 season. Martínez won both races at the opening round in Barcelona, and added a third in succession at Spa, opening up a fourteen-point lead over International DracoRacing's Bertrand Baguette. Baguette remained in contention with Martínez despite not winning a race in the first half of the season, finishing in the top three four times. Indeed, Martínez and Baguette were level on 56 points after the Hungaroring, which earned Martínez a chance to drive a Renault Formula One car at the Silverstone meeting.

Martínez added his fourth win of the season at Silverstone, while P1 Motorsport's James Walker moved ahead of Baguette after a second place at Silverstone, to go along with an earlier win at Spa. However, Martínez's season hit the buffers after that, and Baguette moved into the championship lead after a double win at Le Mans. This was a lead that he was ultimately not to lose. With Baguette seemingly uncatchable, the battle for second place in the championship started to heat up. After the Algarve round, six drivers were split by just fifteen points with Walker, Carlin Motorsport's Jaime Alguersuari, Martínez, Charles Pic of Tech 1 Racing (a race winner at Silverstone), Alguersuari's team-mate Oliver Turvey (winner of the Monaco Grand Prix-support round) and Ultimate Motorsport's Miguel Molina were all in the running for the honours. Molina's season ended after the Algarve, with Ultimate pulling out.

Alguersuari had made his Formula One debut for Scuderia Toro Rosso the previous week at the Hungaroring, and promptly recorded his best weekend of the season in the Algarve, amassing 27 points for the feature race pole, a win in the feature, and a third-place finish in the sprint race. A third win for Baguette at the Nürburgring took him to within reach of the title, and did so with a fifth in the feature race. Fairuz Fauzy, a winner in Hungary, moved into contention for second, with a second and a third in the same round. Pic's second win of the season, gave him the advantage heading to Alcañiz, leading Walker by seven, Alguersuari by nine, and Fauzy and Turvey by seventeen. Martínez's challenge had faded to a distant memory, with four retirements in six races dropping him to seventh.

Despite the pressure being off the Belgian, Baguette finished the season in style with a double win. But the main focus of the weekend was the battle for second in the championship. Even going into the final race of the season, it remain unresolved. Five drivers were separated by eight points, with a maximum of fifteen available. As it turned out, the driver furthest back going into the race came out in second place, as Fauzy finished second behind Baguette, and with none of the other drivers in contention scoring more than six points, the Malaysian edged out Pic by just four points. That said, he was nearly 60 points behind the runaway champion Baguette, who amassed fifteen consecutive points-scoring finishes and 90 points in the final eight races of the season, including five wins. Other drivers to win races were Pasquale Di Sabatino of RC Motorsport and Jon Lancaster of Comtec Racing.

=== Eurocup Formula Renault 2.0 ===
The 2-litre Formula Renaults were dominated by just three drivers; teenagers Albert Costa of Epsilon Euskadi, SG Formula's Jean-Éric Vergne and Motopark Academy figurehead António Félix da Costa. The trio combined for thirteen of the fourteen pole positions, twelve fastest laps and twelve wins, with only Costa's team-mate Nathanaël Berthon and Félix da Costa's team-mate Adrian Quaife-Hobbs breaking the stranglehold. Costa dominated early in the season, winning the first four races on the road. However, he lost his first victory in Barcelona due a technical problem with the gearbox of his Epsilon Euskadi car, gifting victory to Berthon. Félix da Costa was the only driver keeping up with the Spaniard, having finished the first four races on the podium, with three seconds and a third. Vergne was in a lowly eighth, after a non-scoring weekend in Barcelona. Félix da Costa took over the championship lead at the Hungaroring, as Costa retired from the first race which Vergne won.

One of Félix da Costa's endless teammates at Motopark, Marco Sørensen took his first win during the second Hungaroring race, but was latterly disqualified from the weekend a couple of weeks later due to a non-compliance on his car during the Super Pole session. Motopark appealed but would lose their appeal, but was the start of things to come that would eventually lead to their pulling out from the Eurocup and all other Formula Renault 2.0 series. Sørensen's loss was another Motopark driver's gain as Quaife-Hobbs took his first Eurocup victory.

Félix da Costa then took his first Eurocup victory at Silverstone, to take a five-point lead at the halfway stage of the championship. Vergne moved back into contention as he won the second Silverstone race, with non-scores for Costa and Félix da Costa, after the two collided with each other. Vergne continued his good run at Le Mans, doing the double and moved into second in the championship, as Costa retired from the second race. As it stood, Félix da Costa had a seven-point lead over Vergne, who in turn had a seven-point advantage over Costa. The key incident of the season occurred during the Super Pole session at the Nürburgring. Félix da Costa and Kevin Magnussen both ran under appeal during the weekend, due to technical infringements. Again, Motopark would appeal and would lose again. This meant that if Félix da Costa was to win the title, he needed Vergne and Costa to both slip up. Sadly for the Portuguese driver, Costa dominated the whole weekend: two pole positions, two fastest laps and two wins; moving into a decisive championship lead. As it stood, Costa had 114, Vergne 112 and Félix da Costa 97.

Félix da Costa had to do as best as he could, and had to rely on his rivals messing up. He won the first race in Alcañiz, but Costa and Vergne followed him home. Félix da Costa completed the double in the second race, taking his championship tally to 128 points. Guest driver and 2009 Formula Renault UK champion Dean Smith was second but was not eligible for points, which meant third place for Costa gave him second-place points (twelve) and gave him the title by ten points, as Vergne finished sixth. That placing was vital for the French driver, as he and Félix da Costa finished tied on points, with Vergne taking second due to an extra win on countback. Quaife-Hobbs took fourth in the championship, after edging a final race battle with Vergne's team-mate Miquel Monrás.

=== Eurocup Mégane Trophy ===
The Eurocup Mégane Trophy offered up a title fight between McGregor by Equipe Verschuur's Mike Verschuur and TDS Racing's Jonathan Hirschi. Hirschi started the season on fire, taking three of the first four races to lead Verschuur by some twenty points, with Verschuur only eight clear of Pierre Thiriet. This was due to the Dutchman not starting the second Spa race after a problem on the formation lap. Verschuur cut that advantage to five at the Hungaroring, despite not winning either race; finishing behind Dimitri Enjalbert of Boutsen Energy Racing on both occasions. Hirschi was disqualified from the second race due to two collisions in the first eleven laps of the race. Enjalbert added a third win in a row at Silverstone, the race to mark the halfway stage of the season. He was closing fast on the lead two with 48 points in third, with only Hirschi on 76 and Verschuur on 75 ahead of him.

Three in a row became four in a row for Enjalbert, as the French driver continue his procession towards the lead duo. Verschuur took the championship lead for the first time as he finished second behind Enjalbert again, while Hirschi finished down in sixth. Hirschi finally ended Enjalbert's streak at Le Mans, and took back the championship lead from Verschuur by a solitary point with a first and a second compared to the Dutch driver's second and fourth. Four races remained, and the two could be caught by only Enjalbert or Fabrice Walfisch, but that could only be done with bad runs for the top two.

Enjalbert took his win tally to seven at the Nürburgring with his third double win of the season, and was followed home on both occasions by Verschuur, putting him back into the championship lead. A retirement for Hirschi in race one also meant that Verschuur's championship lead heading to Alcañiz was a comfortable fourteen points. Enjalbert had closed to within ten points of Hirschi, despite scoring in only eight races. Verschuur took the title with a double win, and Hirschi took second after Enjalbert suffered a costly retirement from the final race of the season. Walfisch finished best of the rest in fourth place, ahead of Thiriet. In the Gentlemen drivers class, Jean-Philippe Madonia was a comfortable champion, winning nine races.

== Race calendar ==
- Events in light blue were not part of the World Series, but were championship rounds for the Formula Renault 3.5 Series.

Circuit	Location	Date	Series	Winning driver	Winning team
(Spain) Circuit de Catalunya	Montmeló, Spain	18 April	FR3.5 1	(Spain) Marcos Martínez	(Spain) Pons Racing
(Spain) Circuit de Catalunya	Montmeló, Spain	18 April	FR2.0 1	(France) Nathanaël Berthon	(Spain) Epsilon Euskadi
(Spain) Circuit de Catalunya	Montmeló, Spain	18 April	EMT 1	(Switzerland) Jonathan Hirschi	(France) TDS Racing
(Spain) Circuit de Catalunya	Montmeló, Spain	19 April	FR2.0 2	(Spain) Albert Costa	(Spain) Epsilon Euskadi
(Spain) Circuit de Catalunya	Montmeló, Spain	19 April	FR3.5 2	(Spain) Marcos Martínez	(Spain) Pons Racing
(Spain) Circuit de Catalunya	Montmeló, Spain	19 April	EMT 2	(Netherlands) Mike Verschuur	(Netherlands) McGregor by Equipe Verschuur
(Belgium) Circuit de Spa-Francorchamps	Spa, Belgium	2 May	FR2.0 3	(Spain) Albert Costa	(Spain) Epsilon Euskadi
(Belgium) Circuit de Spa-Francorchamps	Spa, Belgium	2 May	FR3.5 3	(Spain) Marcos Martínez	(Spain) Pons Racing
(Belgium) Circuit de Spa-Francorchamps	Spa, Belgium	2 May	EMT 3	(Switzerland) Jonathan Hirschi	(France) TDS Racing
(Belgium) Circuit de Spa-Francorchamps	Spa, Belgium	3 May	FR2.0 4	(Spain) Albert Costa	(Spain) Epsilon Euskadi
(Belgium) Circuit de Spa-Francorchamps	Spa, Belgium	3 May	EMT 4	(Switzerland) Jonathan Hirschi	(France) TDS Racing
(Belgium) Circuit de Spa-Francorchamps	Spa, Belgium	3 May	FR3.5 4	(United Kingdom) James Walker	(United Kingdom) P1 Motorsport
Circuit de Monaco	Monte Carlo, Monaco	24 May	FR3.5 5	(United Kingdom) Oliver Turvey	(United Kingdom) Carlin Motorsport
(Hungary) Hungaroring	Mogyoród, Hungary	13 June	FR3.5 6	(Malaysia) Fairuz Fauzy	(United Kingdom) Mofaz Fortec Motorsport
(Hungary) Hungaroring	Mogyoród, Hungary	13 June	FR2.0 5	(France) Jean-Éric Vergne	(France) SG Formula
(Hungary) Hungaroring	Mogyoród, Hungary	13 June	EMT 5	(France) Dimitri Enjalbert	(Belgium) Boutsen Energy Racing
(Hungary) Hungaroring	Mogyoród, Hungary	14 June	FR3.5 7	(Italy) Pasquale Di Sabatino	(Italy) RC Motorsport
(Hungary) Hungaroring	Mogyoród, Hungary	14 June	FR2.0 6	(United Kingdom) Adrian Quaife-Hobbs	(Germany) Motopark Academy
(Hungary) Hungaroring	Mogyoród, Hungary	14 June	EMT 6	(France) Dimitri Enjalbert	(Belgium) Boutsen Energy Racing
(United Kingdom) Silverstone Circuit	Silverstone, United Kingdom	4 July	FR3.5 8	(Spain) Marcos Martínez	(Spain) Pons Racing
(United Kingdom) Silverstone Circuit	Silverstone, United Kingdom	4 July	EMT 7	(France) Dimitri Enjalbert	(Belgium) Boutsen Energy Racing
(United Kingdom) Silverstone Circuit	Silverstone, United Kingdom	4 July	FR2.0 7	(Portugal) António Félix da Costa	(Germany) Motopark Academy
(United Kingdom) Silverstone Circuit	Silverstone, United Kingdom	5 July	FR2.0 8	(France) Jean-Éric Vergne	(France) SG Formula
(United Kingdom) Silverstone Circuit	Silverstone, United Kingdom	5 July	FR3.5 9	(France) Charles Pic	(France) Tech 1 Racing
(United Kingdom) Silverstone Circuit	Silverstone, United Kingdom	5 July	EMT 8	(France) Dimitri Enjalbert	(Belgium) Boutsen Energy Racing
(France) Bugatti Circuit	Le Mans, France	18 July	FR2.0 9	(France) Jean-Éric Vergne	(France) SG Formula
(France) Bugatti Circuit	Le Mans, France	18 July	FR3.5 10	(Belgium) Bertrand Baguette	(Portugal) International DracoRacing
(France) Bugatti Circuit	Le Mans, France	18 July	EMT 9	(Switzerland) Jonathan Hirschi	(France) TDS Racing
(France) Bugatti Circuit	Le Mans, France	19 July	FR2.0 10	(France) Jean-Éric Vergne	(France) SG Formula
(France) Bugatti Circuit	Le Mans, France	19 July	EMT 10	(France) Dimitri Enjalbert	(Belgium) Boutsen Energy Racing
(France) Bugatti Circuit	Le Mans, France	19 July	FR3.5 11	(Belgium) Bertrand Baguette	(Portugal) International DracoRacing
(Portugal) Autódromo Internacional do Algarve	Portimão, Portugal	1 August	FR3.5 12	(United Kingdom) Jon Lancaster	(United Kingdom) Comtec Racing
(Portugal) Autódromo Internacional do Algarve	Portimão, Portugal	1 August	FR3.5 13	(Spain) Jaime Alguersuari	(United Kingdom) Carlin Motorsport
(Germany) Nürburgring	Nürburg, Germany	19 September	FR3.5 14	(Belgium) Bertrand Baguette	(Portugal) International DracoRacing
(Germany) Nürburgring	Nürburg, Germany	19 September	FR2.0 11	(Spain) Albert Costa	(Spain) Epsilon Euskadi
(Germany) Nürburgring	Nürburg, Germany	19 September	EMT 11	(France) Dimitri Enjalbert	(Belgium) Boutsen Energy Racing
(Germany) Nürburgring	Nürburg, Germany	20 September	FR2.0 12	(Spain) Albert Costa	(Spain) Epsilon Euskadi
(Germany) Nürburgring	Nürburg, Germany	20 September	FR3.5 15	(France) Charles Pic	(France) Tech 1 Racing
(Germany) Nürburgring	Nürburg, Germany	20 September	EMT 12	(France) Dimitri Enjalbert	(Belgium) Boutsen Energy Racing
(Spain) Ciudad del Motor de Aragón	Alcañiz, Spain	24 October	FR2.0 13	(Portugal) António Félix da Costa	(Germany) Motopark Academy
(Spain) Ciudad del Motor de Aragón	Alcañiz, Spain	24 October	FR3.5 16	(Belgium) Bertrand Baguette	(Portugal) International DracoRacing
(Spain) Ciudad del Motor de Aragón	Alcañiz, Spain	24 October	EMT 13	(Netherlands) Mike Verschuur	(Netherlands) McGregor by Equipe Verschuur
(Spain) Ciudad del Motor de Aragón	Alcañiz, Spain	25 October	FR2.0 14	(Portugal) António Félix da Costa	(Germany) Motopark Academy
(Spain) Ciudad del Motor de Aragón	Alcañiz, Spain	25 October	FR3.5 17	(Belgium) Bertrand Baguette	(Portugal) International DracoRacing
(Spain) Ciudad del Motor de Aragón	Alcañiz, Spain	25 October	EMT 14	(Netherlands) Mike Verschuur	(Netherlands) McGregor by Equipe Verschuur

Icon	Championship
FR3.5	Formula Renault 3.5 Series
FR2.0	Eurocup Formula Renault 2.0
EMT	Eurocup Mégane Trophy

== Championships ==
=== Formula Renault 3.5 Series ===
Pos.	Driver	Team	Points
1	(Belgium) Bertrand Baguette	(Portugal) International DracoRacing	155
2	(Malaysia) Fairuz Fauzy	(United Kingdom) Mofaz Fortec Motorsport	98
2	(Malaysia) Fairuz Fauzy	(United Kingdom) Mofaz Racing	98
3	(France) Charles Pic	(France) Tech 1 Racing	94
4	(United Kingdom) Oliver Turvey	(United Kingdom) Carlin Motorsport	93
5	(United Kingdom) James Walker	(United Kingdom) P1 Motorsport	89

=== Eurocup Formula Renault 2.0 ===
Pos.	Driver	Team	Points
1	(Spain) Albert Costa	(Spain) Epsilon Euskadi	138
2	(France) Jean-Éric Vergne	(France) SG Formula	128
3	(Portugal) António Félix da Costa	(Germany) Motopark Academy	128
4	(United Kingdom) Adrian Quaife-Hobbs	(Germany) Motopark Academy	83
5	(Spain) Miquel Monrás	(France) SG Formula	76

=== Eurocup Mégane Trophy ===
Pos.	Driver	Team	Points
1	(Netherlands) Mike Verschuur	(Netherlands) McGregor by Equipe Verschuur	163
2	(Switzerland) Jonathan Hirschi	(France) TDS Racing	136
3	(France) Dimitri Enjalbert	(Belgium) Boutsen Energy Racing	120
4	(France) Fabrice Walfisch	(France) Team Lompech Sport	88
5	(France) Pierre Thiriet	(France) TDS Racing	65
