= Nico Müller =

Swiss racing driver (born 1992)

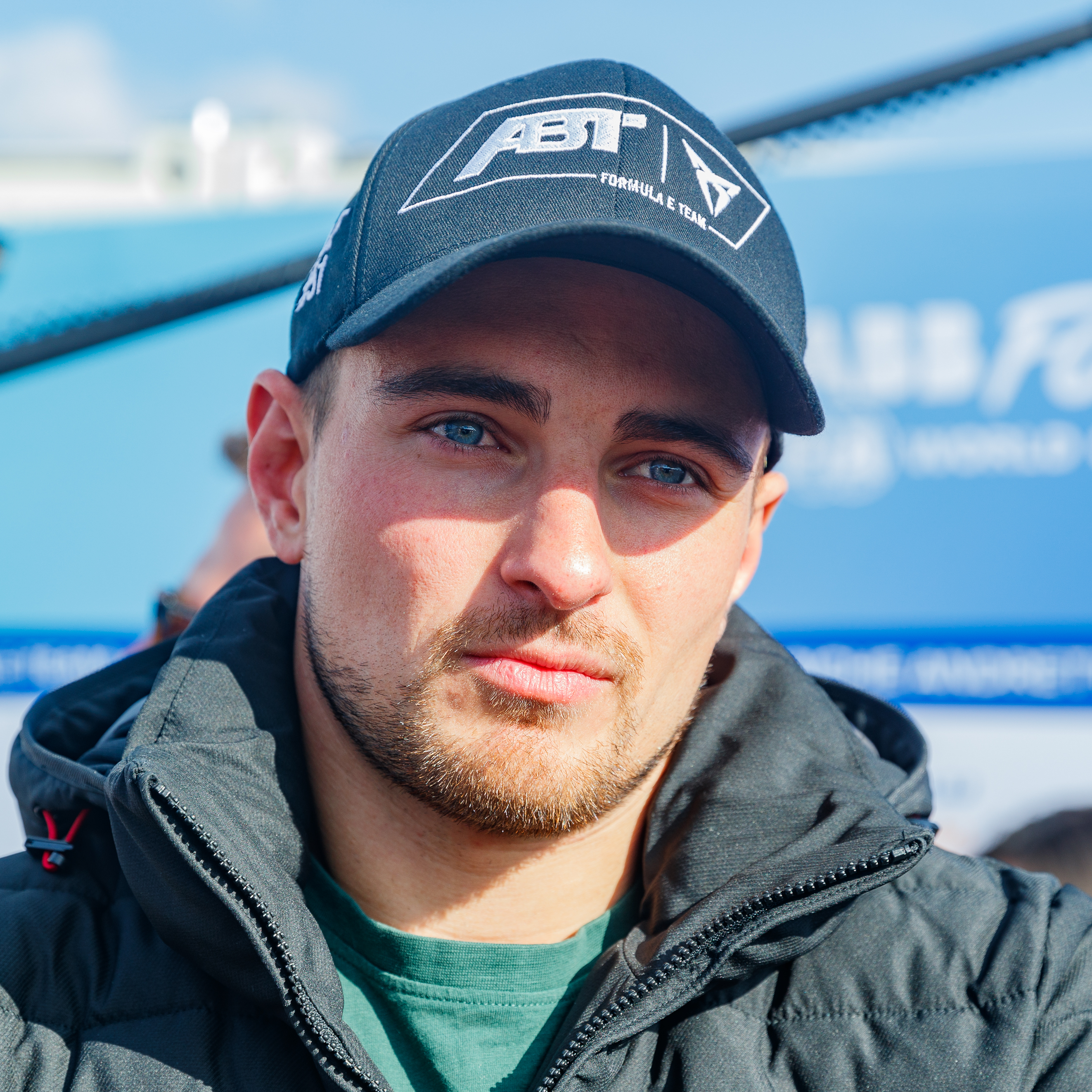
- Müller in 2023
- Nationality: (Switzerland) Swiss
- Born: Nico Sebastian Müller; 25 February 1992 (age 34) Thun, Switzerland

Formula E career
- Debut season: 2019–20
- Current team: Porsche
- Categorisation: FIA Gold (2014–2016); FIA Platinum (2017–)
- Car number: 51
- Former teams: Dragon / Penske, ABT CUPRA, Andretti
- Starts: 71
- Championships: 0
- Wins: 1
- Podiums: 3
- Poles: 1
- Fastest laps: 2
- Best finish: 9th in 2025-26
- Finished last season: 9th (102 pts)

Previous series
- 2014–2022 2012–2013 2010–2011 2009 2008–09 2008 2008: DTM; World Series by Renault; GP3 Series; Eurocup Formula Renault 2.0; Swiss Formula Renault 2.0; Italian Formula Renault 2.0; Formula Renault 2.0 WEC

Championship titles
- 2009: Swiss Formula Renault 2.0

Nico Sebastian Müller (born 25 February 1992) is a Swiss professional racing driver who competes in Formula E for Porsche.

Born and raised in Switzerland, Müller starred in the GP3 Series for Jenzer and reached the Formula Renault 3.5 Series, where he won at Monaco in 2013. After signing for Audi as factory driver, Müller won the Nürburgring 24 Hours in 2015 and battled René Rast for the DTM title in 2019 and 2020. Müller was a confirmed driver for Audi's LMDh project at the time of its cancellation. Müller then joined Peugeot in the FIA World Endurance Championship, and drove his car to the lead of the 24 Hours of Le Mans in 2023 and the Qatar 1812 km in 2024.

Müller has also competed in Formula E since 2019. After topping rookie tests for Audi and moving through underdog teams, Müller was picked up by Porsche in 2024, and promoted to the factory team in 2025. He achieved his first victory at the 2026 Berlin ePrix.

== Career ==
=== Karting ===
Müller began his karting career in 2004 and the following year, Müller finished sixth in the Bridgestone Cup Switzerland ICA Junior class. He improved to third place in the same competition in 2006 and also finished as runner-up in the Swiss Junior Championship. In 2007, he won the Bridgestone Cup Switzerland KF3 class, winning the title by a single point, and took fifth place in the Swiss KF3 championship.

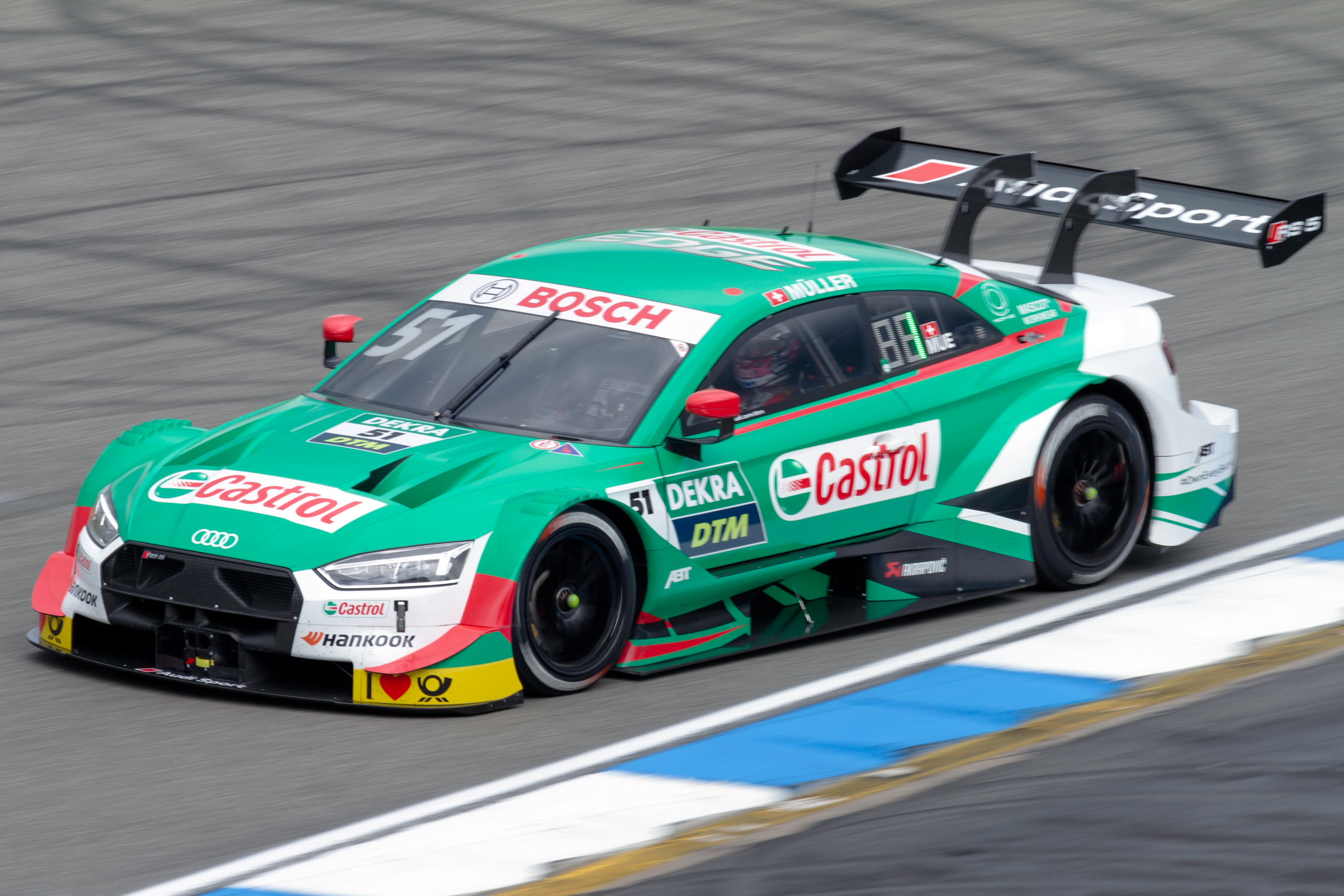
Müller finished the 2019 Deutsche Tourenwagen Masters season second. He repeated this in 2020.

=== Formula Renault 2.0 ===
In 2008, Müller stepped up to single-seaters, racing in his native Formula Renault series for Jenzer Motorsport. In his first year in the category, he finished fifth, taking a victory at Spa-Francorchamps along with two other podium places. He also took part in selected races of both the Italian Formula Renault 2.0 and Formula Renault 2.0 West European Cup series. In November of that year, he contested the Italian Formula Renault 2.0 Winter Series, which was held over two races at the Imola circuit. Müller took two podium places to finish third in the standings, behind Kazim Vasiliauskas and champion Daniel Mancinelli.

Müller remained in the Swiss Formula Renault 2.0 series in 2009 and wrapped up the title in dominant fashion, finishing on the podium in all twelve races, taking nine victories and nine pole positions.

Müller also contested a full season of the Eurocup Formula Renault 2.0 championship with Jenzer Motorsport. He originally finished third in his début race in Barcelona, but was later promoted to second following the disqualification of race winner Albert Costa. During the season he took a further four points-scoring positions to finish eleventh in the championship, the third highest placed rookie driver.

=== GP3 Series ===
In 2010, Müller graduated to the new GP3 Series, continuing his long relationship with Jenzer Motorsport. He took his first victory in the category at the third round of the season in Valencia, winning the sprint race after starting from the front row of the grid. Another podium followed at the next round at Silverstone before he took his second win of the year with victory from pole position in the feature race at the Hungaroring.

A haul of nine points in the final round at Monza ensured that Müller finished the season third overall behind Robert Wickens and eventual champion Esteban Gutiérrez. Müller remained in the championship with Jenzer Motorsport for a second season in 2011.

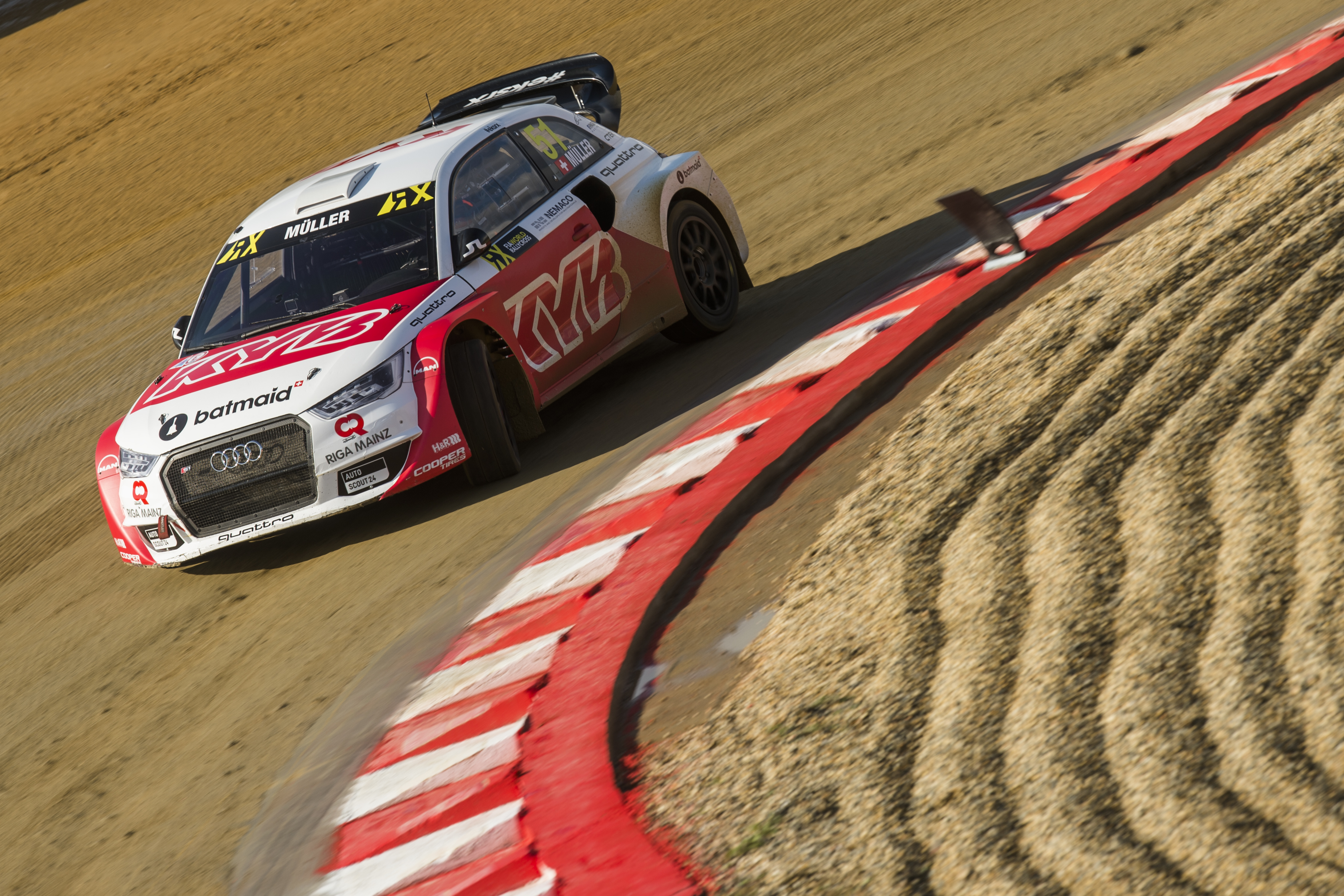
Müller became the first Swiss to race in World RX

=== World Rallycross ===
Müller competed in the 2017 World RX of France and the 2017 World RX of Latvia for the EKS RX team, driving his Audi S1. He finished the events 17th and sixth respectively, .

=== Sports car racing ===
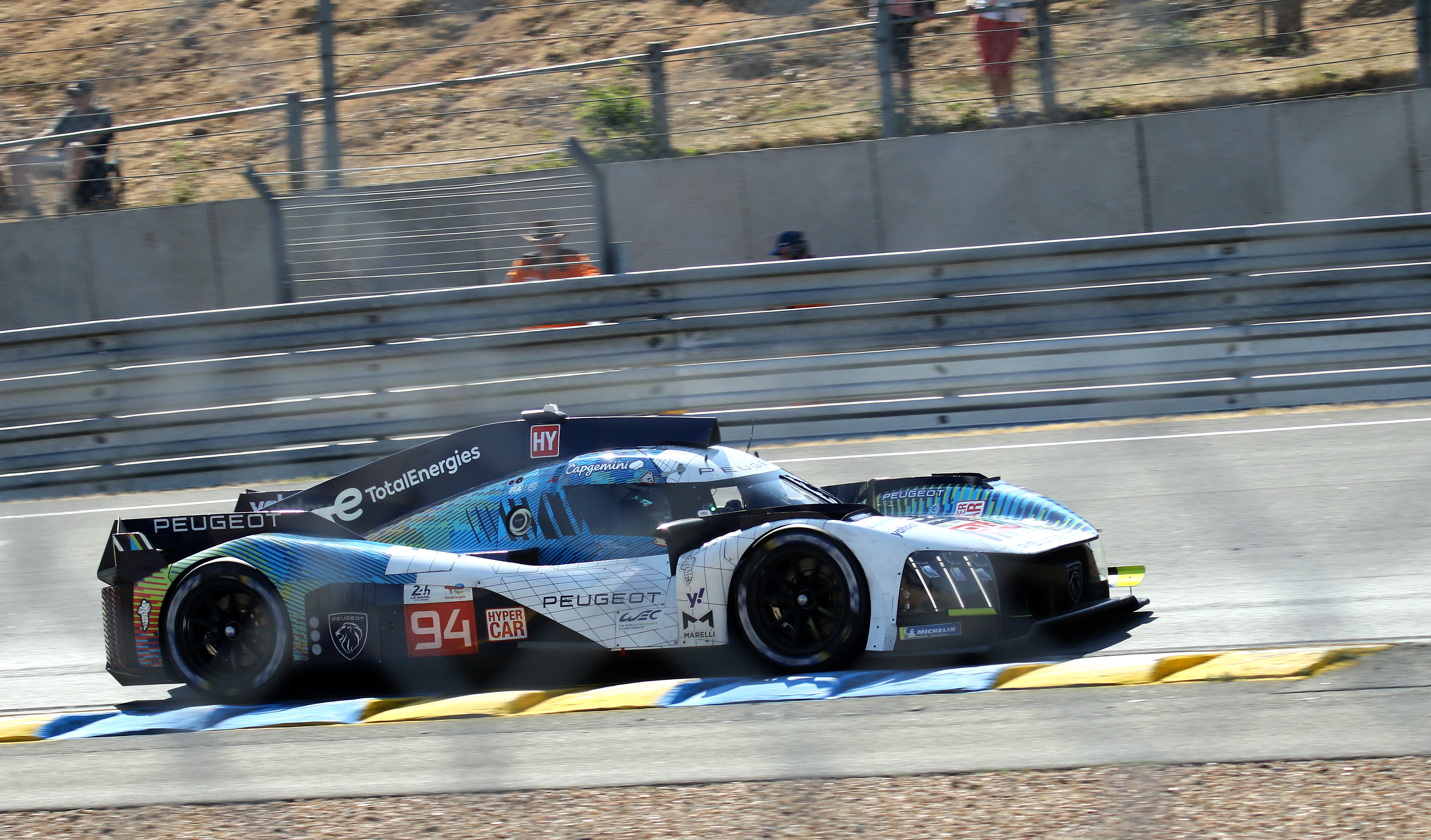
Müller competing at the 2023 24 Hours of Le Mans.

In October 2017, it was announced that Müller would replace relief driver James Rossiter in the No. 26 G-Drive Racing Oreca 07, partnering regular drivers Roman Rusinov and Pierre Thiriet for the 6 Hours of Shanghai in November. He finished seventh after colliding with three cars during the course of the race. That month, Müller was entered into the 2017 FIA GT World Cup, driving an Audi R8 LMS with Audi Sport Team WRT, and was caught up in a first lap multi-car accident in the qualifying race. His car was repaired in time for the main race, but crashed out after hitting a car that spun ahead of him.

=== Other series ===
At the end of October 2009, Müller tested a Formula Renault 3.5 Series car for the first time, driving for Prema Powerteam at Motorland Aragón in Spain as a prize for winning the Swiss Formula Renault title. A week later, he took part in the first International Formula Master test session of the winter at the Hungaroring, finishing as the fastest driver on day one before taking second place the following day.

== Formula E ==
=== Dragon / Penske Autosport (2019–2021) ===
Having acted as a development driver for the Audi Sport ABT Schaeffler team for two seasons, Müller made his Formula E debut in the 2019–20 season, driving for GEOX Dragon alongside Brendon Hartley. His package proved to be largely uncompetitive, leading to the Swiss driver ending up 25th in the standings, lowest of all full-time competitors.

In 2021, Müller remained with the rebranded Dragon / Penske Autosport for another campaign in Formula E. He scored a number of points finishes, including a surprise podium during the Valencia ePrix, a race in which a myriad of drivers ran out of usable energy with mere minutes remaining. Müller eventually exited the series, being replaced by Joel Eriksson for the second half of the season.

=== ABT CUPRA Formula E Team (2023–2024) ===
==== 2022–23 season ====
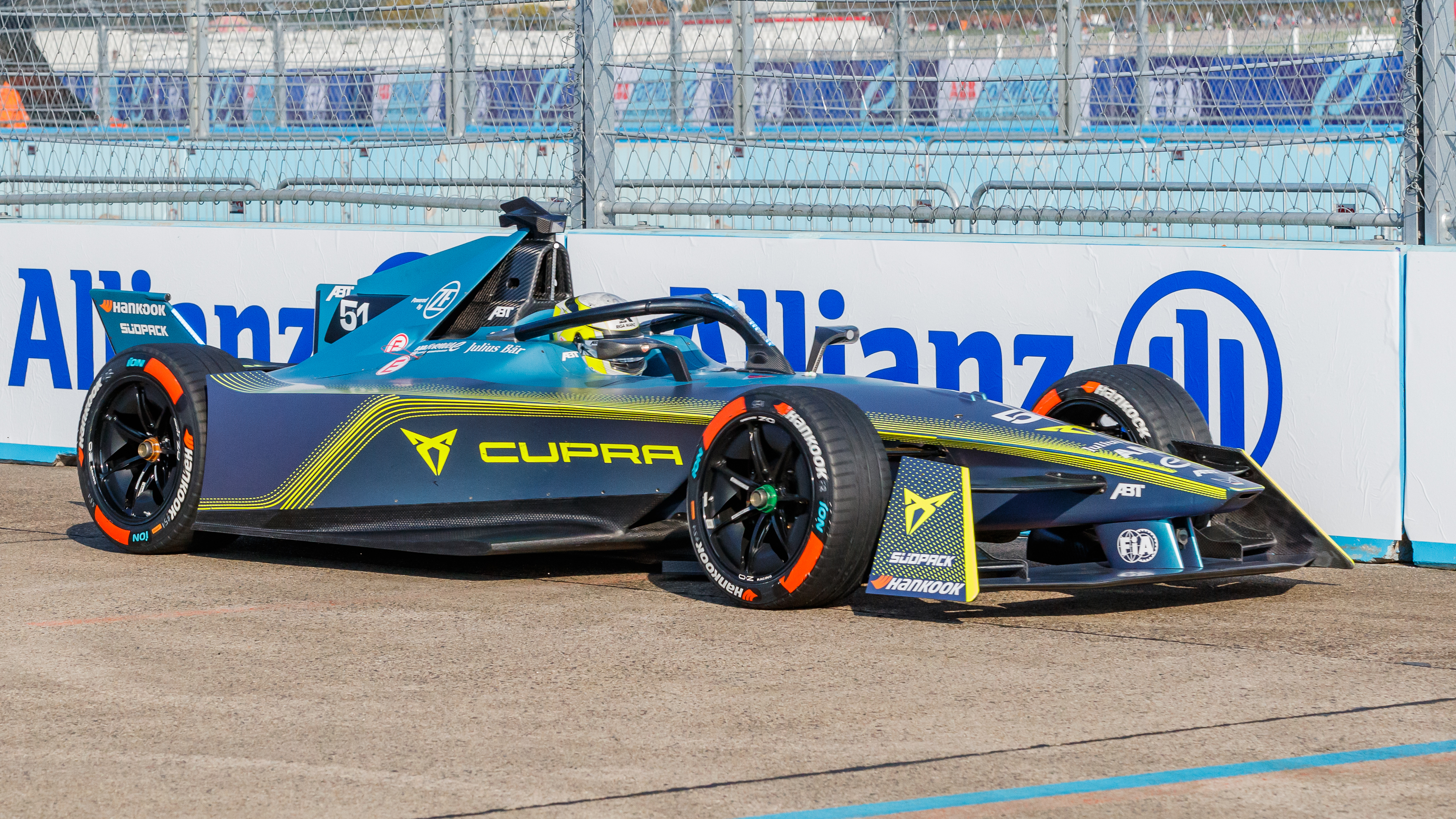
Müller during the 2023 Berlin ePrix

Müller returned to Formula E in 2023, joining the newly re-entered ABT CUPRA outfit for the start of the Gen3 era. The season began in disappointing fashion, with the team playing catch-up to its rivals due to their one-year hiatus from the series, which was compounded by the Swiss driver crashing during Race 2 in Diriyah. A first glimmer of hope materialised in Hyderabad, where a chaotic race with a plethora of retirements elevated Müller to eleventh at the finish, with him having set the fastest lap of the race. Three rounds later in Berlin, ABT profited from a wet qualifying session on Sunday to start on the front row, with Müller narrowly missing out on pole to teammate Robin Frijns. Hours later however, it would be Müller who scored the team's maiden top ten finish of the campaign, ending up ninth in a dry race. In Monaco, points were once again on the table until, with two laps remaining, Sam Bird crashed into the Swiss driver at Sainte Devote, costing Müller a ninth place in the process.

After two point-less events in Indonesia and the United States, Müller proceeded to have his most fruitful weekend of the season at the Rome ePrix: a large crash which eliminated a chunk of the field at the halfway mark of Saturday's race elevated Müller to the top ten, where he was able to consolidate in sixth position, taking home ABT's best result of the season. A day later, Müller finished tenth, getting the final points-paying position after a penalty for António Félix da Costa ahead. He ended the season in fine style, qualifying eighth for the final race at London and maintaining said place, thus jumping to 19th in the drivers' championship.

==== 2023–24 season ====
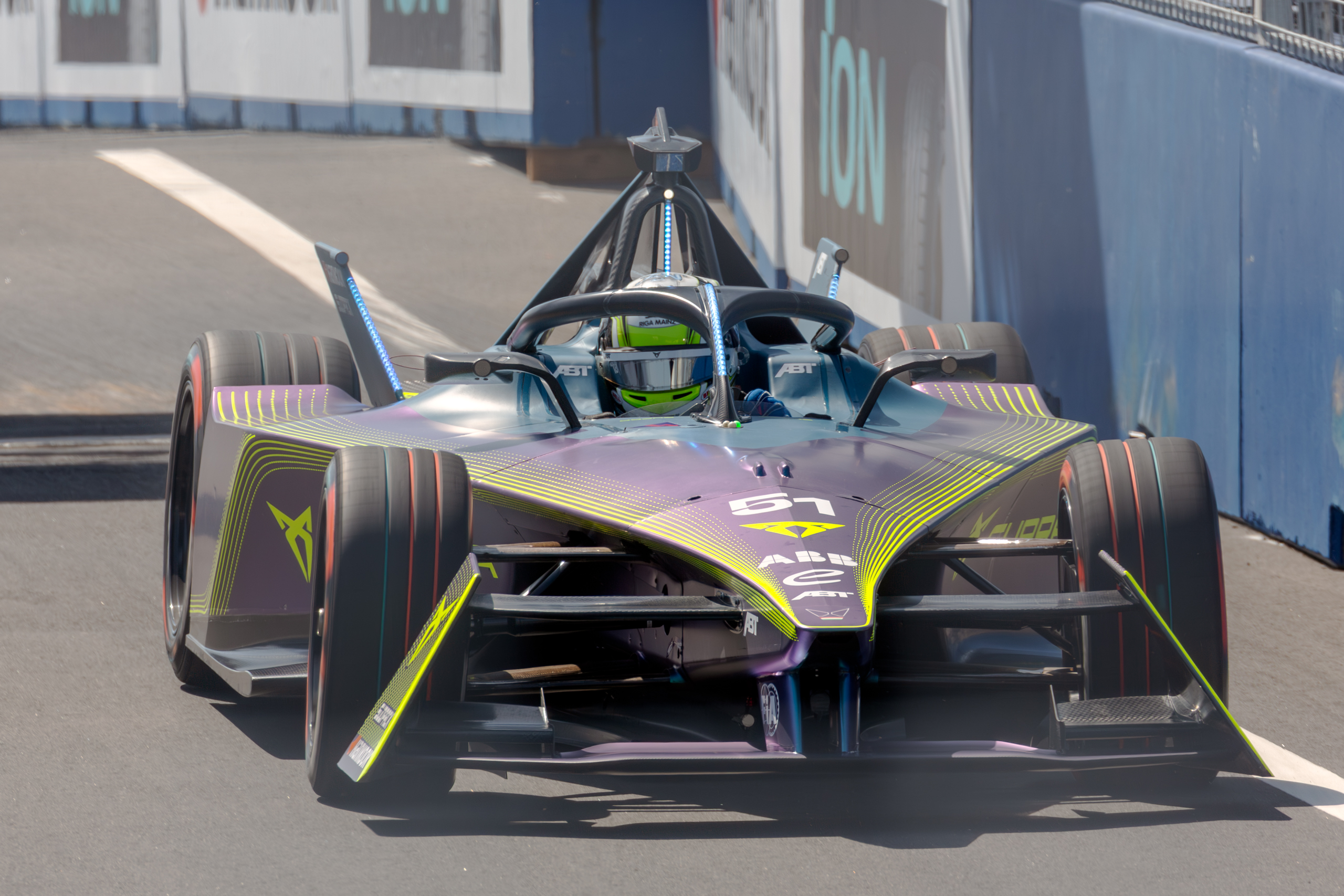
Müller at the 2024 Tokyo ePrix

Müller was retained by ABT CUPRA for the 2023–24 season, partnering a new teammate, former Formula E champion Lucas di Grassi. Following four scoreless races, the Swiss driver finished seventh at the inaugural Tokyo ePrix. At the next weekend in Misano, Müller took home ABT's best result since the team's return to Formula E with a fourth place, losing out on a podium to Nick Cassidy by less than a tenth of a second in the second race.

During the break between the Diriyah and São Paulo events, Müller tested for the Porsche Formula E Team.

Müller left ABT Cupra at the end of the season.

=== Andretti (2024–2025) ===
==== 2024–25 season ====
Müller joined the Andretti Formula E Team for the 2024–25 Formula E World Championship, partnering Season 9 Champion Jake Dennis at the American outfit, driving the Andretti Porsche 99X Electric. After finishing 15th in the standings with 48 points and a highest finish of fourth, he announced his departure from the team.

=== Porsche (2025–) ===
==== 2025–26 season ====
After António Félix da Costa joined Jaguar Racing, Porsche signed Müller to compete alongside Pascal Wehrlein for the 2025–26 season. In the Miami race, he was collected his first pole position.

==== 2026–27 season ====
Müller and Wehrlein continued at Porsche for the 2026—27 season.

== Racing record ==
=== Career summary ===
Season	Series	Team	Races	Wins	Poles	F/Laps	Podiums	Points	Position
2008	Swiss Formula Renault 2.0	Jenzer Motorsport	12	1	0	0	3	174	5th
2008	Italian Formula Renault 2.0	Jenzer Motorsport	4	0	0	0	0	8	32nd
2008	Formula Renault 2.0 WEC	Jenzer Motorsport	2	0	0	0	0	0	52nd
2008	Italian Formula Renault 2.0 - Winter Series	Jenzer Motorsport	2	0	0	0	2	52	**3rd**
2009	Eurocup Formula Renault 2.0	Jenzer Motorsport	14	0	0	0	1	25	11th
2009	Swiss Formula Renault 2.0	Jenzer Motorsport	12	9	9	8	12	317	**1st**
2010	GP3 Series	Jenzer Motorsport	16	2	1	2	4	53	**3rd**
2011	GP3 Series	Jenzer Motorsport	16	1	0	0	3	36	4th
2012	Formula Renault 3.5 Series	International Draco Racing	17	0	0	0	1	78	9th
2013	Formula Renault 3.5 Series	International Draco Racing	17	2	1	0	3	143	5th
2014	Deutsche Tourenwagen Masters	Audi Sport Team Rosberg	10	0	0	1	0	10	19th
2014	Blancpain Endurance Series - Pro	Audi Race Experience	1	0	0	0	0	0	NC
2014	24 Hours of Nürburgring - SP9	G-Drive Racing	1	0	0	0	0	N/A	DNF
2015	Deutsche Tourenwagen Masters	Audi Sport Team Rosberg	18	0	0	0	0	26	21st
2015	Blancpain Endurance Series - Pro	Belgian Audi Club Team WRT	3	0	1	0	1	41	9th
2015	24 Hours of Nürburgring - SP9	Audi Sport Team WRT	1	1	0	0	1	N/A	**1st**
2016	Deutsche Tourenwagen Masters	Audi Sport Team Abt	18	1	1	2	2	88	9th
2016	Blancpain GT Series Endurance Cup	Belgian Audi Club Team WRT	3	0	1	1	1	26	10th
2016	Blancpain GT Series Sprint Cup	Belgian Audi Club Team WRT	4	0	0	0	0	2	27th
2016	Intercontinental GT Challenge	Audi Sport Team WRT	1	0	1	1	1	18	9th
2016	24 Hours of Nürburgring - SP9	Audi Sport Team WRT	1	0	0	0	0	N/A	19th
2016	FIA GT World Cup	Phoenix Racing Asia	0	0	0	0	0	N/A	DNS
2017	Deutsche Tourenwagen Masters	Audi Sport Team Abt Sportsline	18	0	0	1	2	81	12th
2017	Blancpain GT Series Endurance Cup	Audi Sport Team WRT	2	0	0	0	1	29	10th
2017	FIA GT World Cup	Audi Sport Team WRT	1	0	0	0	0	N/A	DNF
2017	Intercontinental GT Challenge	Audi Sport Team WRT	1	0	0	0	0	8	12th
2017	24 Hours of Nürburgring - SP9	Audi Sport Team WRT	1	0	0	0	1	N/A	**3rd**
2017	World Rallycross Championship	EKS RX	2	0	0	0	0	13	17th
2017	FIA World Endurance Championship - LMP2	G-Drive Racing	1	0	0	0	0	6	27th
2017–18	Formula E	Audi Sport ABT Schaeffler	Development driver						
2018	Deutsche Tourenwagen Masters	Audi Sport Team Abt Sportsline	20	0	0	0	3	96	10th
2018	Blancpain GT Series Endurance Cup	Audi Sport Team WRT	1	0	0	0	0	8	39th
2018	Intercontinental GT Challenge	Audi Sport Team WRT	1	0	1	0	0	12	18th
2018	World Rallycross Championship	EKS Audi Sport	1	0	0	0	0	10	19th
2018	Stock Car Brasil	Ipiranga Racing	1	0	0	0	0	0	NC†
2018	24 Hours of Nürburgring - SP9	Audi Sport Team Phoenix	1	0	0	0	0	N/A	6th
2018–19	Formula E	Audi Sport ABT Schaeffler	Test/reserve driver						
2019	Deutsche Tourenwagen Masters	Audi Sport Team Abt Sportsline	18	3	1	4	11	250	**2nd**
2019	Blancpain GT Series Endurance Cup	Audi Sport Team WRT	1	0	0	0	0	3	32nd
2019	Intercontinental GT Challenge	Audi Sport Team WRT	1	0	0	0	0	0	NC
2019–20	Formula E	GEOX Dragon	10	0	0	1	0	0	25th
2020	Deutsche Tourenwagen Masters	Audi Sport Team Abt Sportsline	18	6	3	5	13	330	**2nd**
2020	24 Hours of Nürburgring - SP9	Audi Sport Team Phoenix	1	0	0	0	0	N/A	DNF
2020–21	Formula E	Dragon / Penske Autosport	7	0	0	0	1	30	20th
2021	Deutsche Tourenwagen Masters	Team Rosberg	16	0	0	2	1	56	10th
2021	GT World Challenge Europe Endurance Cup	Audi Sport Team WRT	1	0	0	0	0	18	15th
2021	Intercontinental GT Challenge	Audi Sport Team WRT	2	0	0	0	0	16	12th
2021	24 Hours of Nürburgring - SP9	Audi Sport Team Car Collection	1	0	0	0	0	N/A	5th
2022	Deutsche Tourenwagen Masters	Team Rosberg	16	1	1	0	2	105	7th
2022	FIA World Endurance Championship - Hypercar	Peugeot TotalEnergies	1	0	0	0	0	18	9th
2022	FIA World Endurance Championship - LMP2	Vector Sport	4	0	0	0	1	16	17th
2022	24 Hours of Le Mans - LMP2	Vector Sport	1	0	0	0	0	N/A	22nd
2022	IMSA SportsCar Championship - LMP2	High Class Racing	1	0	0	0	0	0	NC†
2022	GT World Challenge Europe Endurance Cup	Monster VR46 with Team WRT	5	0	0	0	0	30	16th
2022	24 Hours of Nürburgring - SP9	Audi Sport Team Car Collection	1	0	0	0	0	N/A	4th
2022–23	Formula E	ABT CUPRA Formula E Team	15	0	0	1	0	15	19th
2023	FIA World Endurance Championship - Hypercar	Peugeot TotalEnergies	6	0	0	0	0	22	13th
2023	24 Hours of Le Mans - Hypercar	Peugeot TotalEnergies	1	0	0	0	0	N/A	12th
2023–24	Formula E	ABT CUPRA Formula E Team	14	0	0	0	0	52	12th
2024	FIA World Endurance Championship - Hypercar	Peugeot TotalEnergies	8	0	0	0	1	42	12th
2024	24 Hours of Le Mans - Hypercar	Peugeot TotalEnergies	1	0	0	0	0	N/A	12th
2024–25	Formula E	Andretti Formula E	16	0	0	0	0	48	15th
2025	IMSA SportsCar Championship - GTP	JDC–Miller MotorSports	2	0	0	0	0	502	31st
2025	FIA World Endurance Championship - Hypercar	Porsche Penske Motorsport	1	0	0	0	0	0	29th
2025	24 Hours of Le Mans - Hypercar	Porsche Penske Motorsport	Reserve driver						
2025–26	Formula E	Porsche Formula E Team	17	1	1	1	2	102	9th
2026	24 Hours of Le Mans - LMP2	Inter Europol Competition	1	0	0	0	1	N/A	**2nd**
2026	IMSA SportsCar Championship - GTP	JDC–Miller MotorSports	2	0	0	0	0	480	27th
2026–27	Formula E	Porsche Formula E Team	0	0	0	0	0	0	TBD

^{†} As Müller was a guest driver, he was ineligible for points.

=== Complete Formule Renault 2.0 Suisse results ===
(key) (Races in bold indicate pole position) (Races in italics indicate fastest lap)

Year	Entrant	1	2	3	4	5	6	7	8	9	10	11	12	Pos	Points
2008	Jenzer Motorsport	HOC1; 1; 11	HOC1; 2; 8	MOS; 1; 6	MOS; 2; 5	SPA; 1; 5	SPA; 2; 1	HOC2; 1; 3	HOC2; 2; 3	MAG; 1; 6	MAG; 2; 4	MNZ; 1; 5	MNZ; 2 Ret	5th	174
2009	Jenzer Motorsport	**DIJ**; **1**; 1	**DIJ**; **2**; 1	**NUR**; **1**; 1	**NUR**; **2**; 1	SPA; 1; 2	SPA; 2; 2	**LEM**; **1**; 1	LEM; 2; 2	**MAG**; **1**; 1	**MAG**; **2**; 1	**MNZ**; **1**; 1	**MNZ**; **2**; 1	1st	317

=== Complete Eurocup Formula Renault 2.0 results ===
(key) (Races in bold indicate pole position) (Races in italics indicate fastest lap)

Year	Entrant	1	2	3	4	5	6	7	8	9	10	11	12	13	14	Pos	Points
2009	Jenzer Motorsport	CAT; 1; 2	CAT; 2; 22†	SPA; 1; 17	SPA; 2; 10	HUN; 1; 7	HUN; 2; 9	SIL; 1; 15	SIL; 2; 11	LMS; 1; 17	LMS; 2 Ret	NÜR; 1; 5	NÜR; 2; 11	ALC; 1; 24	ALC; 2; 12	11th	25

=== Complete GP3 Series results ===
(key) (Races in bold indicate pole position) (Races in italics indicate fastest lap)

Year	Entrant	1	2	3	4	5	6	7	8	9	10	11	12	13	14	15	16	DC	Points
2010	Jenzer Motorsport	CAT; FEA; 13	CAT; SPR; 9	IST; FEA; 6	IST; SPR; 4	VAL; FEA; 7	VAL; SPR; 1	SIL; FEA; 3	SIL; SPR; 4	HOC; FEA; Ret	HOC; SPR; 17	**HUN**; **FEA**; 1	HUN; SPR; 6	SPA; FEA; 4	SPA; SPR; 6	MNZ; FEA; 4	MNZ; SPR; 3	3rd	53
2011	Jenzer Motorsport	IST; FEA; 11	IST; SPR; 15	CAT; FEA; 5	CAT; SPR; Ret	VAL; FEA; Ret	VAL; SPR; 14	SIL; FEA; 1	SIL; SPR; 11	NÜR; FEA; 15	NÜR; SPR; 7	HUN; FEA; 4	HUN; SPR; 5	SPA; FEA; 7	SPA; SPR; 3	MNZ; FEA; 4	MNZ; SPR; 3	4th	36

=== Complete Formula Renault 3.5 Series results ===
(key) (Races in bold indicate pole position) (Races in italics indicate fastest lap)

Year	Team	1	2	3	4	5	6	7	8	9	10	11	12	13	14	15	16	17	Pos	Points
2012	International Draco Racing	ALC; 1 Ret	ALC; 2 Ret	MON; 1; 5	SPA; 1; 5	SPA; 2; 4	NÜR; 1; 2	NÜR; 2 Ret	MSC; 1; 8	MSC; 2 Ret	SIL; 1 Ret	SIL; 2; 7	HUN; 1; 6	HUN; 2 Ret	LEC; 1; 8	LEC; 2; 7	CAT; 1; 12	CAT; 2; 15	9th	78
2013	International Draco Racing	MNZ; 1; 13	MNZ; 2; 5	ALC; 1 Ret	ALC; 2; 5	**MON**; **1**; 1	SPA; 1 Ret	SPA; 2; 5	MSC; 1; 7	MSC; 2; 4	RBR; 1; 13	RBR; 2; 8	HUN; 1; 1	HUN; 2; 5	LEC; 1; 10	LEC; 2; 2	CAT; 1; 12	CAT; 2; 4	5th	143

=== Complete Deutsche Tourenwagen Masters results ===
(key) (Races in bold indicate pole position) (Races in italics indicate fastest lap)

Year	Team	Car	1	2	3	4	5	6	7	8	9	10	11	12	13	14	15	16	17	18	19	20	Pos	Points
2014	Audi Sport Team Rosberg	Audi RS5 DTM	HOC; 16	OSC; 16	HUN; 12	NOR; 18	MSC; 5	SPL; 19	NÜR; Ret	LAU; Ret	ZAN; Ret	HOC; 13											19th	10
2015	Audi Sport Team Rosberg	Audi RS5 DTM	HOC; 1; 6	HOC; 2; 19	LAU; 1; 20	LAU; 2; 9	NOR; 1; 18	NOR; 2; 19	ZAN; 1; 9	ZAN; 2; 21	SPL; 1; 12	SPL; 2; 5	MSC; 1; 9	MSC; 2; 9	OSC; 1 Ret	OSC; 2 Ret	NÜR; 1; 16	NÜR; 2; 16	HOC; 1; 14	HOC; 2; 16			21st	26
2016	Audi Sport Team Abt	Audi RS5 DTM	**HOC**; **1**; 3	HOC; 2; 7	SPL; 1; 10	SPL; 2 Ret	LAU; 1; 10	LAU; 2; 8	NOR; 1; 20	NOR; 2; 1	ZAN; 1; 20	ZAN; 2; 5	MSC; 1; 13	MSC; 2; 7	NÜR; 1; 11	NÜR; 2; 5	HUN; 1; 5	HUN; 2 Ret	HOC; 1; 15	HOC; 2; 13			9th	88
2017	Audi Sport Team Abt Sportsline	Audi RS5 DTM	HOC; 1; 9	HOC; 2; 5	LAU; 1; 18	LAU; 2; 6	HUN; 1; 10	HUN; 2; 4	NOR; 1; 9	NOR; 2; 13	MSC; 1; 15	MSC; 2; 15	ZAN; 1; 10	ZAN; 2; 4	NÜR; 1; 11	NÜR; 2 Ret	SPL; 1; 3	SPL; 2; 3	HOC; 1; 12	HOC; 2; 11			12th	81
2018	Audi Sport Team Abt Sportsline	Audi RS5 DTM	HOC; 1; 13	HOC; 2; 13	LAU; 1 Ret	LAU; 2; 17	HUN; 1; 3	HUN; 2; 14	NOR; 1; 18	NOR; 2; 7	ZAN; 1 Ret	ZAN; 2; 7	BRH; 1; 15	BRH; 2; 10	MIS; 1; 5	MIS; 2; 10	NÜR; 1; 10	NÜR; 2; 14	SPL; 1; 3	SPL; 2; 2	HOC; 1; 7	HOC; 2; 4	10th	96
2019	Audi Sport Team Abt Sportsline	Audi RS5 Turbo DTM	HOC; 1; 8	HOC; 2; 2	ZOL; 1; 3	ZOL; 2; 8	MIS; 1; 5	MIS; 2; 1	**NOR**; **1**; 2	NOR; 2; 8	ASS; 1; 2	ASS; 2; 3	BRH; 1; 3	BRH; 2; 2	LAU; 1; 1	LAU; 2; 2	NÜR; 1; 15	NÜR; 2; 6	HOC; 1; 17	HOC; 2; 1			2nd	250
2020	Audi Sport Team Abt Sportsline	Audi RS5 Turbo DTM	SPA; 1; 1	SPA; 2; 1	LAU; 1; 1	LAU; 2; 2	**LAU**; **1**; 2	LAU; 2; 5	ASS; 1; 3	ASS; 2; 3	**NÜR**; **1**; 1	**NÜR**; **2**; 5	NÜR; 1; 5	NÜR; 2; 1	ZOL; 1; 3	ZOL; 2; 9	ZOL; 1; 6	ZOL; 2; 2	HOC; 1; 1	HOC; 2; 2			2nd	330
2021	Team Rosberg	Audi R8 LMS Evo	MNZ; 1; 7	MNZ; 2; 2	LAU; 1; 13	LAU; 2; 10	ZOL; 1; 10	ZOL; 2; 4	NÜR; 1; 7	NÜR; 2; 9	RBR; 1 Ret	RBR; 2; 14	ASS; 1 Ret	ASS; 2; 8	HOC; 1 Ret	HOC; 2; 12	NOR; 1; 8	NOR; 2; 15					10th	56
2022	Team Rosberg	Audi R8 LMS Evo II	ALG; 1 Ret	**ALG**; **2**; 1^{1}	LAU; 1 Ret	LAU; 2; 5	IMO; 1; 2^{2}	IMO; 2; 8	NOR; 1 Ret	NOR; 2; 12	NÜR; 1 Ret	NÜR; 2; 6	SPA; 1; 6	SPA; 2; 22	RBR; 1; 6^{3}	RBR; 2; 7	HOC; 1; 8	HOC; 2; 6					7th	105

=== Complete Blancpain GT Series Sprint Cup results ===
Year	Team	Car	Class	1	2	3	4	5	6	7	8	9	10	Pos.	Points
2016	Belgian Audi Club Team WRT	Audi R8 LMS	Pro	MIS; QR	MIS; CR	BRH; QR	BRH; CR	NÜR; QR; 5	NÜR; CR; 34	HUN; QR	HUN; CR	CAT; QR; Ret	CAT; CR; 14	27th	2

=== Complete FIA World Rallycross Championship results ===
(key)

==== Supercar ====
Year	Entrant	Car	1	2	3	4	5	6	7	8	9	10	11	12	WRX	Points
2017	EKS RX	Audi S1	BAR	POR	HOC	BEL	GBR	NOR	SWE	CAN	FRA; 17	LAT; 6	GER	RSA	17th	13
2018	EKS Audi Sport	Audi S1	BAR	POR	BEL	GBR	NOR	SWE	CAN	FRA	LAT; 9	USA	GER	RSA	19th	10

=== Complete FIA World Endurance Championship results ===
Year	Entrant	Class	Car	Engine	1	2	3	4	5	6	7	8	9	Rank	Points
2017	G-Drive Racing	LMP2	Oreca 07	Gibson GK428 4.2 L V8	SIL	SPA	LMS	NÜR	MEX	COA	FUJ	SHA; 7	BHR	27th	6
2022	Vector Sport	LMP2	Oreca 07	Gibson GK428 4.2 L V8	SEB; NC	SPA; 10	LMS; 13	MNZ; 3	FUJ					17th	16
2022	Peugeot TotalEnergies	Hypercar	Peugeot 9X8	Peugeot X6H 2.6 L Turbo V6						BHR; 4				9th	18
2023	Peugeot TotalEnergies	Hypercar	Peugeot 9X8	Peugeot X6H 2.6 L Turbo V6	SEB; NC	ALG; 5	SPA; 9	LMS; 9	MNZ; 11	FUJ	BHR; 8			13th	22
2024	Peugeot TotalEnergies	Hypercar	Peugeot 9X8	Peugeot X6H 2.6 L Turbo V6	QAT; DSQ	IMO; 9	SPA; 10	LMS; 12	SÃO; 8	COA; 12	FUJ; 4	BHR; 3		12th	42
2025	Porsche Penske Motorsport	Hypercar	Porsche 963	Porsche 4.6 L Turbo V8	QAT	IMO	SPA; 12	LMS	SÃO	COA	FUJ	BHR		29th	0

=== Complete 24 Hours of Le Mans results ===
Year	Team	Co-drivers	Car	Class	Laps	Pos.	Class pos.
2022	(United Kingdom) Vector Sport	(France) Sébastien Bourdais (Republic of Ireland) Ryan Cullen	Oreca 07-Gibson	LMP2	357	27th	22nd
2023	(France) Peugeot TotalEnergies	(France) Loïc Duval (United States) Gustavo Menezes	Peugeot 9X8	Hypercar	312	27th	12th
2024	(France) Peugeot TotalEnergies	(Denmark) Mikkel Jensen (France) Jean-Éric Vergne	Peugeot 9X8	Hypercar	309	12th	12th
2026	(Poland) Inter Europol Competition	(France) Reshad de Gerus (United States) Bijoy Garg	Oreca 07-Gibson	LMP2	360	16th	**2nd**

=== Complete Formula E results ===
(key) (Races in bold indicate pole position; races in italics indicate fastest lap)

Year	Team	Chassis	Powertrain	1	2	3	4	5	6	7	8	9	10	11	12	13	14	15	16	17	Pos	Points
2019–20	GEOX Dragon	Spark SRT05e	Penske EV-4	DIR; DNS	DIR; Ret	SCL; 12	MEX; Ret	MRK; 20	BER; NC	BER; 14	BER; 12	BER; 20	BER; 17	BER; 22							25th	0
2020–21	Dragon / Penske Autosport	Spark SRT05e	Penske EV-4/EV-5	DIR; 21	DIR; 5	RME; 13	RME; 9	VLC; 2	VLC; 20	MCO; 18	PUE	PUE	NYC	NYC	LDN	LDN	BER	BER			20th	30
2022–23	ABT CUPRA Formula E Team	Formula E Gen3	Mahindra M9Electro	MEX; 14	DRH; Ret	DRH; Ret	HYD; 11	CAP; WD	SAP; Ret	BER; 15	BER; 9	MCO; Ret	JAK; 11	JAK; 12	POR; Ret	RME; 6	RME; 10	LDN; Ret	LDN; 8		19th	15
2023–24	ABT CUPRA Formula E Team	Formula E Gen3	Mahindra M9Electro	MEX; 17	DRH; 18	DRH; 13	SAP; Ret	TOK; 7	MIS; 11	MIS; 4	MCO; Ret	BER	BER	SIC; 15	SIC; 15	POR; 5	POR; 6	LDN; 6	LDN; 6		12th	52
2024–25	Andretti Formula E	Formula E Gen3 Evo	Porsche 99X Electric	SAO; Ret	MEX; 9	JED; Ret	JED; 11	MIA; 4	MCO; 5	MCO; Ret	TKO; 12	TKO; 11	SHA; 15	SHA; 6	JKT; 4	BER; 8	BER; 17	LDN; 15	LDN; Ret		15th	48
2025–26	Porsche Formula E Team	Formula E Gen3 Evo	Porsche 99X Electric	SAO; 5	MEX; 9	**MIA**; 2	JED; 4	JED; 16	MAD; 8	BER; 1	BER; 13	MCO; 11	MCO; 6	SAN; 7	SHA; 10	SHA; 7	TKO; 18	TKO; 7	LDN; 11	LDN; 12	9th	102

^{*} Season still in progress.

=== Complete IMSA SportsCar Championship results ===
(key) (Races in bold indicate pole position; results in italics indicate fastest lap)

Year	Team	Class	Make	Engine	1	2	3	4	5	6	7	8	9	Pos.	Points
2022	High Class Racing	LMP2	Oreca 07	Gibson GK428 V8	DAY; 9†	SEB	LGA	MDO	WGL	ELK	PET			NC†	0†
2025	JDC–Miller MotorSports	GTP	Porsche 963	Porsche 9RD 4.6 L V8	DAY	SEB; 8	LBH	LGA	DET	WGL	ELK	IMS; 8	PET	31st	502
2026	JDC–Miller MotorSports	GTP	Porsche 963	Porsche 9RD 4.6 L V8	DAY	SEB	LBH	LGA	DET	WGL	ELK	IMS; 9	PET; 9	27th	480

^{†} Points only counted towards the Michelin Endurance Cup, and not the overall LMP2 Championship.

Sporting positions
Preceded by Christopher Zanella	Swiss Formula Renault 2.0; Champion; 2009	Succeeded by Zoël Amberg; FR2.0 Middle; European Championship
