= 2026 Jeddah ePrix =

Race 4 of 17 of the 2025–26 Formula E season
← Previous race	Next race →
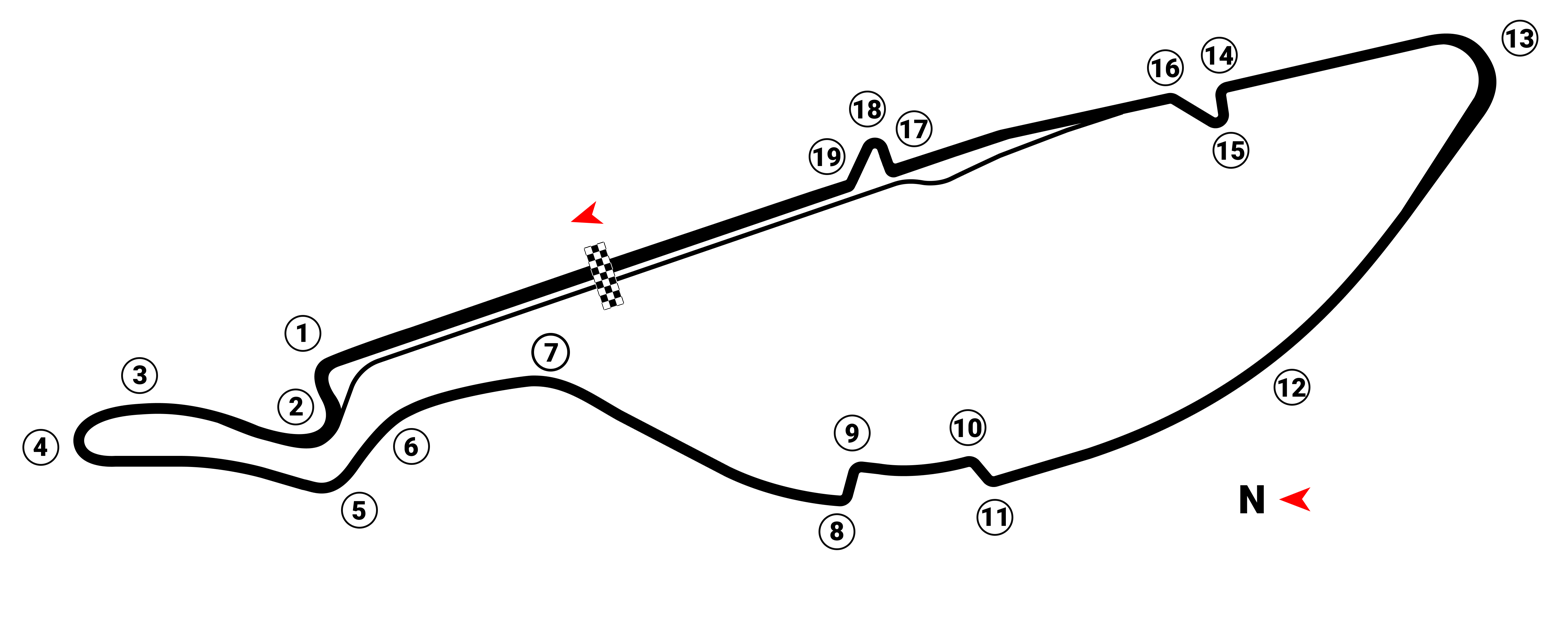

Race details
- Date: 13 February 2026
- Official name: 2026 Jeddah E-Prix
- Location: Jeddah Corniche Circuit, Jeddah, Saudi Arabia
- Course: Street circuit
- Course length: 3.001 km (1.865 mi)
- Distance: 32 laps, 96.004 km (59.654 mi)

Pole position
Driver	(Switzerland) Edoardo Mortara	Mahindra
- Time: 1:15.336

Fastest lap
Driver	(United Kingdom) Dan Ticktum	Cupra Kiro-Porsche
- Time: 1:17.334

Podium
First	(Germany) Pascal Wehrlein	Porsche
Second	(Switzerland) Edoardo Mortara	Mahindra
Third	(New Zealand) Mitch Evans	Jaguar

2026 Jeddah ePrix
Race 5 of 17 of the 2025–26 Formula E season
← Previous race	Next race →
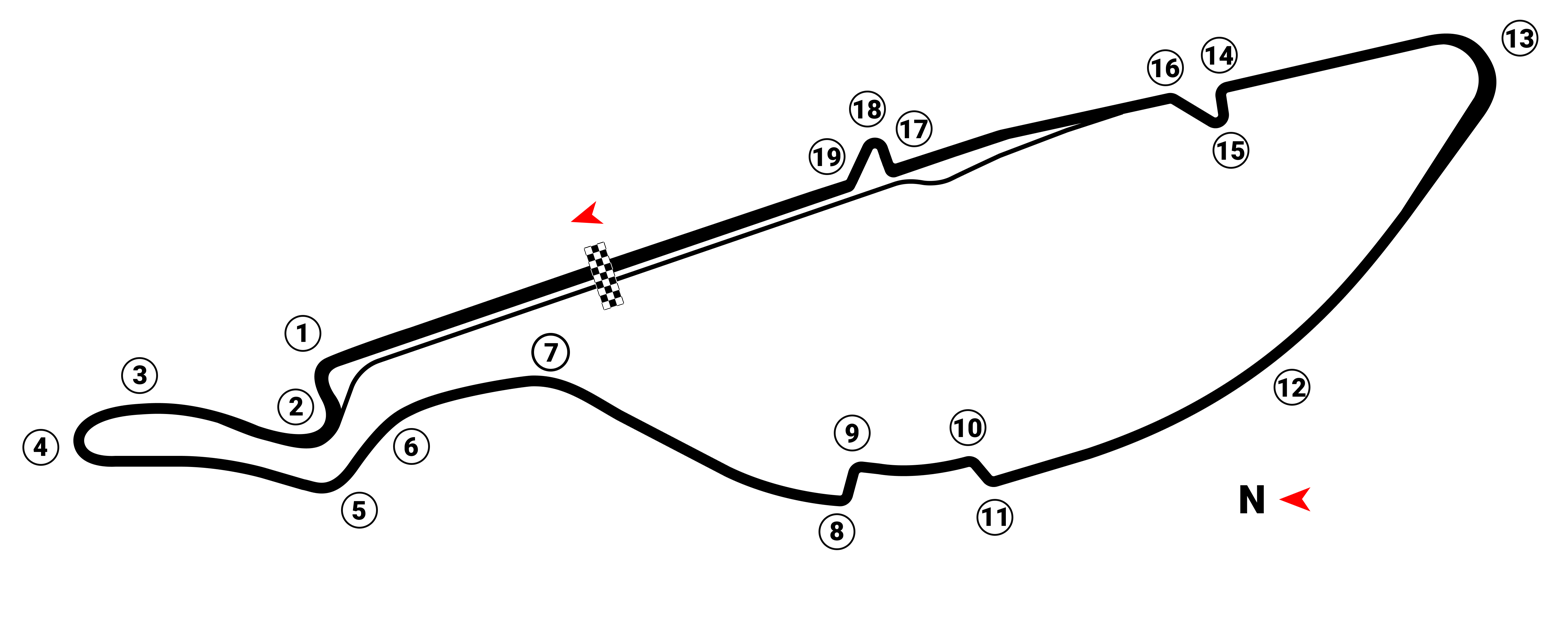

Race details
- Date: 14 February 2026
- Official name: 2026 Jeddah E-Prix
- Location: Jeddah Corniche Circuit, Jeddah, Saudi Arabia
- Course: Street circuit
- Course length: 3.001 km (1.865 mi)
- Distance: 30 laps, 90.002 km (55.925 mi)

Pole position
Driver	(Switzerland) Edoardo Mortara	Mahindra
- Time: 1:15.116

Fastest lap
Driver	(United Kingdom) Jake Dennis	Andretti-Porsche
- Time: 1:15.653

Podium
First	(Portugal) António Félix da Costa	Jaguar
Second	(Switzerland) Sébastien Buemi	Envision-Jaguar
Third	(United Kingdom) Oliver Rowland	Nissan

The 2026 Jeddah ePrix was a pair of Formula E electric car races at the Jeddah Corniche Circuit in the town of Jeddah, in Saudi Arabia on the 13 and 14 February 2026. It served as the fourth and fifth round of the 2025–26 Formula E season, the second edition of the Jeddah ePrix and the eighth time a Formula E ePrix was held in Saudi Arabia.

The first race was won by Pascal Wehrlein, with Edoardo Mortara and Mitch Evans rounding out the podium. António Félix da Costa won the second race, ahead of Sébastien Buemi and Oliver Rowland to round out the podium.

== Background ==
Nick Cassidy led the championship with 30 points. Pascal Wehrlein and Jake Dennis were second and third, with 2 and 3 points behind respectively.

== Classification ==
(All times are in AST).

=== Race 1 ===
==== Qualifying ====
Qualifying for race 1 took place at 3:20 PM on 13 February.

Group draw
Group A	(New Zealand) CAS	(United Kingdom) DEN	(Switzerland) MUE	(Switzerland) MOR	(Switzerland) BUE	(Netherlands) DEV	(Spain) MAR	(France) JEV	(France) NAT	(Brazil) DIG
Group B	(Germany) WEH	(United Kingdom) ROW	(New Zealand) EVA	(Sweden) ERI	(United Kingdom) BAR	(Germany) GUE	(Portugal) DAC	(Barbados) MAL	(Brazil) DRU	(United Kingdom) TIC

==== Qualifying duels ====
Quarter-finals
A2	(France) Norman Nato
A3	(France) Jean-Éric Vergne
A1	(Switzerland) Edoardo Mortara
A4	(Switzerland) Nico Müller
B2	(Portugal) António Félix da Costa
B3	(Germany) Maximilian Günther
B1	(Germany) Pascal Wehrlein
B4	(United Kingdom) Taylor Barnard

Semi-finals
(France) Norman Nato
(Switzerland) Edoardo Mortara
(Germany) Maximilian Günther
(Germany) Pascal Wehrlein

Final
(Switzerland) Edoardo Mortara
(Germany) Maximilian Günther

==== Overall classification ====
Pos.	No.	Driver	Team	A	B	QF	SF	F	Grid
1	48	(Switzerland) Edoardo Mortara	Mahindra	1:17.378	—N/a	1:15.515	1:15.242	1:15.336	1
2	7	(Germany) Maximilian Günther	DS Penske	—N/a	1:17.473	1:15.473	1:15.417	1:15.447	2
3	94	(Germany) Pascal Wehrlein	Porsche	—N/a	1:17.426	1:15.366	1:15.431	—N/a	3
4	23	(France) Norman Nato	Nissan	1:17.514	—N/a	1:15.334	1:15.476	—N/a	4
5	77	(United Kingdom) Taylor Barnard	DS Penske	—N/a	1:17.596	1:15.510	—N/a	—N/a	5
6	13	(Portugal) António Félix da Costa	Jaguar	—N/a	1:17.440	1:15.686	—N/a	—N/a	6
7	51	(Switzerland) Nico Müller	Porsche	1:17.669	—N/a	1:15.892	—N/a	—N/a	7
8	25	(France) Jean-Éric Vergne	Citroën	1:17.613	—N/a	1:16.007	—N/a	—N/a	8
9	27	(United Kingdom) Jake Dennis	Andretti-Porsche	1:17.735	—N/a	—N/a	—N/a	—N/a	9
10	9	(New Zealand) Mitch Evans	Jaguar	—N/a	1:17.597	—N/a	—N/a	—N/a	10
11	21	(Netherlands) Nyck de Vries	Mahindra	1:17.796	—N/a	—N/a	—N/a	—N/a	11
12	33	(United Kingdom) Dan Ticktum	Cupra Kiro-Porsche	—N/a	1:17.662	—N/a	—N/a	—N/a	12
13	37	(New Zealand) Nick Cassidy	Citroën	1:17.826	—N/a	—N/a	—N/a	—N/a	13
14	14	(Sweden) Joel Eriksson	Envision-Jaguar	—N/a	1:17.677	—N/a	—N/a	—N/a	14
15	3	(Spain) Pepe Martí	Cupra Kiro-Porsche	1:17.835	—N/a	—N/a	—N/a	—N/a	15
16	1	(United Kingdom) Oliver Rowland	Nissan	—N/a	1:17.712	—N/a	—N/a	—N/a	16
17	11	(Brazil) Lucas di Grassi	Lola Yamaha ABT	1:18.071	—N/a	—N/a	—N/a	—N/a	17
18	28	(Brazil) Felipe Drugovich	Andretti-Porsche	—N/a	1:17.777	—N/a	—N/a	—N/a	18
19	16	(Switzerland) Sébastien Buemi	Envision-Jaguar	1:18.074	—N/a	—N/a	—N/a	—N/a	19
20	22	(Barbados) Zane Maloney	Lola Yamaha ABT	—N/a	1:17.778	—N/a	—N/a	—N/a	20

==== Race ====
Race 1 started at 8:05 PM on 13 February.

Pos.	No.	Driver	Team	Laps	Time/Retired	Grid	Points
1	94	(Germany) Pascal Wehrlein	Porsche	32	47:18.506	3	25+1^{2}
2	48	(Switzerland) Edoardo Mortara	Mahindra	32	+2.677	1	18+3^{1}
3	9	(New Zealand) Mitch Evans	Jaguar	32	+7.097	10	15
4	51	(Switzerland) Nico Müller	Porsche	32	+8.735	7	12
5	13	(Portugal) António Félix da Costa	Jaguar	32	+9.153	6	10
6	37	(New Zealand) Nick Cassidy	Citroën	32	+11.381	13	8
7	16	(Switzerland) Sébastien Buemi	Envision-Jaguar	32	+11.386	18	6
8	25	(France) Jean-Éric Vergne	Citroën	32	+12.305	8	4
9	27	(United Kingdom) Jake Dennis	Andretti-Porsche	32	+12.726	9	2
10	77	(United Kingdom) Taylor Barnard	DS Penske	32	+13.125	5	1
11	7	(Germany) Maximilian Günther	DS Penske	32	+16.048	2	
12	33	(United Kingdom) Dan Ticktum	Cupra Kiro-Porsche	32	+16.283	12	
13	23	(France) Norman Nato	Nissan	32	+16.718	4	
14	3	(Spain) Pepe Martí	Cupra Kiro-Porsche	32	+17.048	15	
15	28	(Brazil) Felipe Drugovich	Andretti-Porsche	32	+19.871	17	
16	11	(Brazil) Lucas di Grassi	Lola Yamaha ABT	32	+20.280	20	
17	1	(United Kingdom) Oliver Rowland	Nissan	32	+22.257	16	
18	14	(Sweden) Joel Eriksson	Envision-Jaguar	32	+43.191	14	
19	22	(Barbados) Zane Maloney	Lola Yamaha ABT	0		19	
20	21	(Netherlands) Nyck de Vries	Mahindra	0	DNS	11	

Notes:

- ^1 – Pole position.
- ^2 – Fastest lap.

==== Standings after the race ====
Drivers' Championship standings

	Pos	Driver	Points
1	1	(Germany) Pascal Wehrlein	64
1	2	(New Zealand) Nick Cassidy	48
4	3	(Switzerland) Edoardo Mortara	47
1	4	(Switzerland) Nico Müller	45
1	5	(New Zealand) Mitch Evans	41

Teams' Championship standings

	Pos	Team	Points
	1	(Germany) Porsche	109
1	2	(India) Mahindra	59
1	3	(France) Citroën	56
3	4	(United Kingdom) Jaguar	55
1	5	(United States) Andretti	39

Manufacturers' Championship standings

	Pos	Manufacturer	Points
	1	(Germany) Porsche	125
1	2	(United Kingdom) Jaguar	81
1	3	(Netherlands) Stellantis	77
1	4	(India) Mahindra	58
1	5	(Japan) Nissan	48

- Notes: Only the top five positions are included for all three sets of standings.

=== Race 2 ===
==== Qualifying ====
Qualifying for race 2 took place at 3:20 PM on 14 February.

Group draw
Group A	(Germany) WEH	(Switzerland) MOR	(New Zealand) EVA	(United Kingdom) ROW	(Sweden) ERI	(United Kingdom) BAR	(Germany) GUE	(France) JEV	(France) NAT	(United Kingdom) TIC
Group B	(New Zealand) CAS	(Switzerland) MUE	(United Kingdom) DEN	(Switzerland) BUE	(Portugal) DAC	(Netherlands) DEV	(Spain) MAR	(Barbados) MAL	(Brazil) DRU	(Brazil) DIG

==== Qualifying duels ====
Quarter-finals
A2	(Germany) Maximilian Günther
A3	(United Kingdom) Oliver Rowland
A1	(Switzerland) Edoardo Mortara
A4	(France) Jean-Éric Vergne
B2	(United Kingdom) Jake Dennis
B3	(Switzerland) Sébastien Buemi
B1	(Portugal) António Félix da Costa
B4	(New Zealand) Nick Cassidy

Semi-finals
(United Kingdom) Oliver Rowland
(Switzerland) Edoardo Mortara
(United Kingdom) Jake Dennis
(Portugal) António Félix da Costa

Final
(Switzerland) Edoardo Mortara
(United Kingdom) Jake Dennis

==== Overall classification ====
Pos.	No.	Driver	Team	A	B	QF	SF	F	Grid
1	48	(Switzerland) Edoardo Mortara	Mahindra	1:17.151	—N/a	1:15.168	1:15.124	1:15.116	1
2	27	(United Kingdom) Jake Dennis	Andretti-Porsche	—N/a	1:17.338	1:15.320	1:15.060	1:15.153	2
3	13	(Portugal) António Félix da Costa	Jaguar	—N/a	1:17.215	1:15.571	1:15.391	—N/a	3
4	1	(United Kingdom) Oliver Rowland	Nissan	1:17.251	—N/a	1:15.383	1:15.468	—N/a	4
5	25	(France) Jean-Éric Vergne	Citroën	1:17.262	—N/a	1:15.579	—N/a	—N/a	5
6	7	(Germany) Maximilian Günther	DS Penske	1:17.222	—N/a	1:15.603	—N/a	—N/a	6
7	16	(Switzerland) Sébastien Buemi	Envision-Jaguar	—N/a	1:17.365	1:15.663	—N/a	—N/a	7
8	37	(New Zealand) Nick Cassidy	Citroën	—N/a	1:17.380	1:16.050	—N/a	—N/a	8
9	33	(United Kingdom) Dan Ticktum	Cupra Kiro-Porsche	1:17.282	—N/a	—N/a	—N/a	—N/a	9
10	22	(Barbados) Zane Maloney	Lola Yamaha ABT	—N/a	1:17.461	—N/a	—N/a	—N/a	10
11	94	(Germany) Pascal Wehrlein	Porsche	1:17.330	—N/a	—N/a	—N/a	—N/a	11
12	28	(Brazil) Felipe Drugovich	Andretti-Porsche	—N/a	1:17.476	—N/a	—N/a	—N/a	12
13	9	(New Zealand) Mitch Evans	Jaguar	1:17.344	—N/a	—N/a	—N/a	—N/a	13
14	3	(Spain) Pepe Martí	Cupra Kiro-Porsche	—N/a	1:17.549	—N/a	—N/a	—N/a	14
15	23	(France) Norman Nato	Nissan	1:17.349	—N/a	—N/a	—N/a	—N/a	15
16	51	(Switzerland) Nico Müller	Porsche	—N/a	1:17.592	—N/a	—N/a	—N/a	16
17	77	(United Kingdom) Taylor Barnard	DS Penske	1:17.392	—N/a	—N/a	—N/a	—N/a	17
18	21	(Netherlands) Nyck de Vries	Mahindra	—N/a	1:17.622	—N/a	—N/a	—N/a	18
19	14	(Sweden) Joel Eriksson	Envision-Jaguar	1:17.426	—N/a	—N/a	—N/a	—N/a	19
20	11	(Brazil) Lucas di Grassi	Lola Yamaha ABT	—N/a	1:17.708	—N/a	—N/a	—N/a	20

==== Race ====
Race 2 started at 8:05 PM on 14 February.

Pos.	No.	Driver	Team	Laps	Time/Retired	Grid	Points
1	13	(Portugal) António Félix da Costa	Jaguar	30	41:21.590	3	25
2	16	(Switzerland) Sébastien Buemi	Envision-Jaguar	30	+2.574	7	18
3	1	(United Kingdom) Oliver Rowland	Nissan	30	+3.508	4	15
4	48	(Switzerland) Edoardo Mortara	Mahindra	30	+3.924	1	12+3^{1}
5	33	(United Kingdom) Dan Ticktum	Cupra Kiro-Porsche	30	+4.521	9	10
6	3	(Spain) Pepe Martí	Cupra Kiro-Porsche	30	+5.461	14	8+1^{2}
7	9	(New Zealand) Mitch Evans	Jaguar	30	+5.926	13	6
8	94	(Germany) Pascal Wehrlein	Porsche	30	+6.348	11	4
9	25	(France) Jean-Éric Vergne	Citroën	30	+6.887	5	2
10	77	(United Kingdom) Taylor Barnard	DS Penske	30	+9.170	17	1
11	7	(Germany) Maximilian Günther	DS Penske	30	+9.476	6	
12	28	(Brazil) Felipe Drugovich	Andretti-Porsche	30	+14.206	12	
13	14	(Sweden) Joel Eriksson	Envision-Jaguar	30	+14.714	18	
14	37	(New Zealand) Nick Cassidy	Citroën	30	+14.769	8	
15	11	(Brazil) Lucas di Grassi	Lola Yamaha ABT	30	+14.787	19	
16	51	(Switzerland) Nico Müller	Porsche	30	+15.979	16	
17	23	(France) Norman Nato	Nissan	30	+17.951	15	
18	22	(Barbados) Zane Maloney	Lola Yamaha ABT	30	+23.342	10	
19	27	(United Kingdom) Jake Dennis	Andretti-Porsche	30	+1:08.185	2	
20	21	(Netherlands) Nyck de Vries	Mahindra	30	+1:09.107	20	

Notes:

- ^1 – Pole position.
- ^2 – Fastest lap.

==== Standings after the race ====
Drivers' Championship standings

	Pos	Driver	Points
	1	(Germany) Pascal Wehrlein	68
1	2	(Switzerland) Edoardo Mortara	62
4	3	(United Kingdom) Oliver Rowland	49
2	4	(New Zealand) Nick Cassidy	48
	5	(New Zealand) Mitch Evans	47

Teams' Championship standings

	Pos	Team	Points
	1	(Germany) Porsche	113
2	2	(United Kingdom) Jaguar	86
1	3	(India) Mahindra	74
1	4	(France) Citroën	58
1	5	(United Kingdom) Envision	55

Manufacturers' Championship standings

Pos	Manufacturer	Points
1	(Germany) Porsche	143
2	(United Kingdom) Jaguar	124
3	(Netherlands) Stellantis	87
4	(India) Mahindra	70
5	(Japan) Nissan	64

- Notes: Only the top five positions are included for all three sets of standings.

== Notes ==
Previous race: 2026 Miami ePrix	FIA Formula E World Championship; 2025–26 season	Next race: 2026 Madrid ePrix
Previous race: 2025 Jeddah ePrix	Jeddah ePrix	Next race: 2027 Jeddah ePrix
