= 2012 Eurocup Mégane Trophy =

Seasons
- ← 2011 2013 →

The 2012 Eurocup Mégane Trophy season was the eighth season of the Renault–supported touring car category, a one-make racing series that is part of the World Series by Renault.

== Driver lineup ==
Team	No.	Driver	Status	Rounds
(Italy) Oregon Team	1	(France) Nicolas Milan		1–3
(Italy) Oregon Team	1	(Brazil) Roberto Moreno		4
(Italy) Oregon Team	1	(France) Marguerite Laffite		5–7
(Italy) Oregon Team	2	(Italy) Enrico Bettera	G	1–4, 6
(Italy) Oregon Team	2	(Italy) "Navajo"	G	5–6
(Italy) Oregon Team	2	(Italy) Omar Mambretti	G	5
(Italy) Oregon Team	3	(Italy) Kevin Gilardoni		All
(Italy) Oregon Team	4	(Switzerland) Fabien Thuner		All
(Italy) Oregon Team	8	(Italy) Niccolò Nalio		All
(Italy) Oregon Team	14	(Spain) Albert Costa		All
(Italy) Torino Motorsport	2	(Italy) "Navajo"	G	7
(Italy) Torino Motorsport	2	(Italy) Andrea Boffo	G	7
(France) TDS Racing	5	(Netherlands) Jeroen Schothorst	G	All
(France) TDS Racing	6	(Netherlands) Bas Schothorst		All
(France) TDS Racing	7	(Netherlands) Wim Beelen	G	1–2, 6–7
(France) TDS Racing	7	(Netherlands) Tom Coronel		3–4
(France) TDS Racing	7	(Netherlands) Tim Coronel		5
(France) TDS Racing	12	(Netherlands) Kelvin Snoeks		All
(France) Team Lompech Sport	9	(France) Jean-Charles Miginiac	G	All
(France) Team Lompech Sport	10	(Belgium) David Dermont		1–2
(France) Team Lompech Sport	10	(France) Thibault Bossy		3, 6–7
(France) Team Lompech Sport	10	(Switzerland) Stefano Comini		4–5
(Spain) PujolaRacing	11	(Spain) Toni Forne	G	1, 6–7
(Spain) PujolaRacing	11	(France) Bruce Lorgère-Roux		2–3
(Netherlands) Equipe Verschuur	15	(Sweden) Richard Kressner	G	6
(Germany) AFK Motorsport	23	(Germany) Oliver Freymuth	G	1–3, 5–7
(Portugal) Algarve Pro Racing Team	24	(United Kingdom) Michael Munemann	G	1–3, 5–7
(Portugal) Algarve Pro Racing Team	25	(Netherlands) Rembert Berg	G	3
(Portugal) Algarve Pro Racing Team	25	(Czech Republic) Jakub Knoll		6

Icon	Class
G	Gentleman Driver

=== Driver changes ===
Changed teams

- Fabien Thuner switched from Boutsen Energy Racing to Oregon Team.
- David Dermont moved to Team Lompech Sport.
- Bas Schothorst and Jeroen Schothorst both moved to TDS Racing.

Entering Eurocup Mégane Trophy

- Eurocup Clio champion Nicolas Milan, Formula Renault Alps driver Kevin Gilardoni and Formula Renault 3.5 Series driver Albert Costa debuted with Oregon Team.
- FIA Formula Two Championship driver Kelvin Snoeks entered the championship for TDS Racing.

=== Team changes ===
- Boutsen Energy Racing, Equipe Verschuur, Brixia Horse Power and Blue Jumeirah Team have all left the Eurocup Mégane Trophy.

=== Mid-season changes ===
- Rembert Berg debuted in the series, joining Michael Munemann in the Algarve Pro Racing Team.
- Tom Coronel made his debut in the series, replacing Wim Beelen from the Nürburgring round onwards.
- David Dermont was replaced by Thibault Bossy at Nürburgring. Defending series champion Stefano Comini replaced Bossy for the Moscow round.
- Bruce Lorgère-Roux replaced Toni Forne after the opening round at Alcañiz.
- Roberto Moreno made his debut in the series, replacing Nicolas Milan at the Moscow event.

== Race calendar and results ==
The calendar for the 2012 season was announced on 10 October 2011, the day after the end of the 2011 season. Silverstone Circuit was dropped from the calendar in favour of a round at the new Moscow Raceway in Russia. All seven rounds will form meetings of the 2012 World Series by Renault season.

Round		Circuit	Country	Date	Pole position	Fastest lap	Winning driver	Winning team
1	R1	Ciudad del Motor de Aragón, Alcañiz	Spain	5 May	(Spain) Albert Costa	(Netherlands) Bas Schothorst	(Netherlands) Bas Schothorst	(France) TDS Racing
1	R2	Ciudad del Motor de Aragón, Alcañiz	Spain	6 May	(Netherlands) Bas Schothorst	(Netherlands) Bas Schothorst	(Netherlands) Bas Schothorst	(France) TDS Racing
2	R1	Circuit de Spa-Francorchamps	Belgium	2 June	(Italy) Niccolò Nalio	(Netherlands) Bas Schothorst	(Netherlands) Bas Schothorst	(France) TDS Racing
2	R2	Circuit de Spa-Francorchamps	Belgium	3 June	(Italy) Niccolò Nalio	(Netherlands) Bas Schothorst	(Netherlands) Bas Schothorst	(France) TDS Racing
3	R1	Nürburgring	Germany	30 June	(Spain) Albert Costa	(Switzerland) Fabien Thuner	(Spain) Albert Costa	(Italy) Oregon Team
3	R2	Nürburgring	Germany	1 July	(Spain) Albert Costa	(Netherlands) Bas Schothorst	(Netherlands) Bas Schothorst	(France) TDS Racing
4	R1	Moscow Raceway	Russia	14 July	(Spain) Albert Costa	(Italy) Niccolò Nalio	(Switzerland) Fabien Thuner	(Italy) Oregon Team
4	R2	Moscow Raceway	Russia	15 July	(Spain) Albert Costa	(Spain) Albert Costa	(Spain) Albert Costa	(Italy) Oregon Team
5	R1	Hungaroring, Mogyoród	Hungary	15 September	(Spain) Albert Costa	(Spain) Albert Costa	(Spain) Albert Costa	(Italy) Oregon Team
5	R2	Hungaroring, Mogyoród	Hungary	16 September	(Italy) Kevin Gilardoni	(Spain) Albert Costa	(Spain) Albert Costa	(Italy) Oregon Team
6	R1	Circuit Paul Ricard, Le Castellet	France	29 September	(Netherlands) Bas Schothorst	(Spain) Albert Costa	(Spain) Albert Costa	(Italy) Oregon Team
6	R2	Circuit Paul Ricard, Le Castellet	France	30 September	(Spain) Albert Costa	(Spain) Albert Costa	(Spain) Albert Costa	(Italy) Oregon Team
7	R1	Circuit de Catalunya, Montmeló	Spain	20 October	(Italy) Kevin Gilardoni	(Netherlands) Bas Schothorst	(Netherlands) Bas Schothorst	(France) TDS Racing
7	R2	Circuit de Catalunya, Montmeló	Spain	21 October	(Spain) Albert Costa	(Spain) Albert Costa	(Spain) Albert Costa	(Italy) Oregon Team

== Championship standings ==
- Points for both championships were awarded as follows:

1st	2nd	3rd	4th	5th	6th	7th	8th	9th	10th
25	18	15	12	10	8	6	4	2	1

=== Drivers' Championship ===
Pos	Driver	ALC (Spain)		SPA (Belgium)		NÜR (Germany)		MSC (Russia)		HUN (Hungary)		LEC (France)		CAT (Spain)		Points
1	(Spain) Albert Costa	**2**	3	Ret	3	**1**	**2**	**5**	**1**	**1**	1	1	**1**	Ret	**1**	251
2	(Netherlands) Bas Schothorst	1	**1**	1	1	3	1	6	5	5	4	**4**	2	1	4	247
3	(Italy) Kevin Gilardoni	7	4	2	5	5	5	4	4	3	**3**	5	4	**DSQ**	2	160
4	(Italy) Niccolò Nalio	3	2	**DNS**	**2**	4	12	3	2	4	Ret	3	3	Ret	3	153
5	(Switzerland) Fabien Thuner	4	5	8	14	2	Ret	1	Ret	6	2	2	5	6	Ret	131
6	(Netherlands) Kelvin Snoeks	6	8	3	7	8	10	7	6	7	DNS	7	6	Ret	5	82
7	(France) Jean-Charles Miginiac	9	6	4	11	9	4	8	7	Ret	6	13	11	5	9	69
8	(France) Thibault Bossy					11	3					9	8	3	6	46
9	(France) Nicolas Milan	8	12	5	4	7	6									40
10	(Netherlands) Jeroen Schothorst	Ret	Ret	DSQ	13	10	7	9	10	9	7	10	10	7	7	37
11	(Switzerland) Stefano Comini							2	Ret	2	Ret					36
12	(Spain) Toni Forne	5	7									17	Ret	4	Ret	28
13	(Netherlands) Wim Beelen	Ret	Ret	DSQ	8							12	Ret	2	8	26
14	(France) Bruce Lorgère-Roux			6	DNS	6	9									18
15	(United Kingdom) Michael Munemann	12	9	Ret	9	Ret	Ret			10	8	8	DSQ	Ret	DNS	16
16	(Netherlands) Tom Coronel					Ret	13	Ret	3							15
17	(Germany) Oliver Freymuth	10	10	7	10	12	8			NC	Ret	16	NC	Ret	10	14
18	(Belgium) David Dermont	Ret	Ret	DSQ	6											8
19	(Sweden) Richard Kressner											6	Ret			8
20	(Brazil) Roberto Moreno							Ret	8							4
21	(Czech Republic) Jakub Knoll											11	9			4
22	(Italy) Enrico Bettera	11	11	DSQ	12	Ret	Ret	Ret	9			15				2
23	(Netherlands) Rembert Berg					13	11									0
	(Italy) "Old Navajo"									DSQ			Ret	DSQ		0
Guest drivers ineligible for points
	(Netherlands) Tim Coronel									8	5					0
	(France) Marguerite Laffite									Ret	Ret	14	7	8	12	0
	(Italy) Omar Mambretti										9					0
	(Italy) Andrea Boffo														11	0
Pos	Driver	ALC (Spain)		SPA (Belgium)		NÜR (Germany)		MSC (Russia)		HUN (Hungary)		LEC (France)		CAT (Spain)		Points

Colour	Result
Gold	Winner
Silver	Second place
Bronze	Third place
Green	Points classification
Blue	Non-points classification
Blue	Non-classified finish (NC)
Purple	Retired, not classified (Ret)
Red	Did not qualify (DNQ)
Red	Did not pre-qualify (DNPQ)
Black	Disqualified (DSQ)
White	Did not start (DNS)
White	Withdrew (WD)
White	Race cancelled (C)
Blank	Did not practice (DNP)
Blank	Did not arrive (DNA)
Blank	Excluded (EX)

**Bold** – Pole
Italics – Fastest Lap
