= 2009 Eurocup Formula Renault 2.0 =

Motor racing competition

Seasons
- ← 2008 2010 →

The 2009 Eurocup Formula Renault 2.0 season was the nineteenth Eurocup Formula Renault 2.0 season. The season began at Circuit de Catalunya on April 18 and finished at the Ciudad del Motor de Aragón on October 25, after fourteen rounds. This season was the last for the current specification Tatuus chassis introduced in 2000, as a new chassis will be introduced for the 2010 season. Albert Costa won the title holding off the challenges of Jean-Éric Vergne and António Félix da Costa, who finished tied on points, with Vergne finishing second on a tie-breaker.

== Teams and drivers ==
- This season saw a cap on entries, with the lineup being capped at 38 entries, depending on the circuit. Guest entries are listed in italics.

| Team | No. | Driver name | Class | Rounds |
|---|---|---|---|---|
| (France) SG Formula | 1 | (France) Jean-Éric Vergne | | All |
| (France) SG Formula | 2 | (Spain) Miki Monrás | J | All |
| (France) SG Formula | 3 | (France) Hugo Valente | J | All |
| (France) SG Formula | 4 | (France) Arthur Pic | J | All |
| (France) SG Formula | 5 | (New Zealand) Dominic Storey | | 1-2 |
| (France) SG Formula | 5 | (United Arab Emirates) Ramez Azzam | J | 3-7 |
| (Germany) Motopark Academy | 6 | (Portugal) António Félix da Costa | J | All |
| (Germany) Motopark Academy | 7 | (Denmark) Marco Sørensen | | All |
| (Germany) Motopark Academy | 8 | (Colombia) Juan Jacobo | J | 1-2 |
| (Germany) Motopark Academy | 8 | (Poland) Kuba Giermaziak | | 3, 5-7 |
| (Germany) Motopark Academy | 8 | (Finland) Matias Laine | | 4 |
| (Germany) Motopark Academy | 57 | (Finland) Matias Laine | | 5 |
| (Germany) Motopark Academy | 9 | (United Kingdom) Adrian Quaife-Hobbs | | All |
| (Germany) Motopark Academy | 10 | (Denmark) Kevin Magnussen | J | All |
| (Germany) Motopark Academy | 56 | (Brazil) Luís Felipe Derani | | 2, 4, 6 |
| (Germany) Motopark Academy | 59 | (Sweden) Jimmy Eriksson | J | 6 |
| (Germany) Motopark Academy | 60 | (Netherlands) Bart Hylkema | J | 6 |
| (Germany) Motopark Academy | 65 | (Germany) Patrick Kronenberger | | 7 |
| (Spain) Epsilon Euskadi | 11 | (France) Nathanaël Berthon | | All |
| (Spain) Epsilon Euskadi | 12 | (Colombia) Carlos Muñoz | J | All |
| (Spain) Epsilon Euskadi | 14 | (Spain) Albert Costa | | All |
| (Spain) Epsilon Euskadi | 15 | (Italy) Federico Scionti | J | 7 |
| (Spain) Epsilon Euskadi | 16 | (Spain) Miguel Otegui | J | 3-7 |
| (Italy) BVM Minardi | 21 | (Italy) Andrea Roda | | 3, 6–7 |
| (Italy) BVM Minardi | 22 | (United Kingdom) Dean Smith | | 7 |
| (United Kingdom) Fortec Motorsport | 24 | (Sweden) Kevin Kleveros | J | 1–6 |
| (United Kingdom) Fortec Motorsport | 25 | (United Kingdom) Oliver Webb | | 1, 5 |
| (United Kingdom) Fortec Motorsport | 25 | (Sweden) Fredrik Blomstedt | | 2 |
| (United Kingdom) Fortec Motorsport | 26 | (United Kingdom) James Calado | | 1–2, 5 |
| (United Kingdom) Fortec Motorsport | 27 | (United Kingdom) Will Stevens | | 2, 5 |
| (France) Epsilon Sport | 28 | (United Kingdom) Luciano Bacheta | | 1–2, 4–7 |
| (France) Epsilon Sport | 54 | (France) Arno Santamato | J | 1–3 |
| (Netherlands) MP Motorsport | 29 | (United Kingdom) Adam Christodoulou | | 2 |
| (Netherlands) MP Motorsport | 29 | (Estonia) Karl-Oscar Liiv | | 4–7 |
| (Netherlands) MP Motorsport | 30 | (Netherlands) Nigel Melker | | 1–5 |
| (Netherlands) MP Motorsport | 31 | (Netherlands) Daniël de Jong | J | All |
| (Czech Republic) Krenek Motorsport | 32 | (Czech Republic) Adam Kout | | All |
| (Czech Republic) Krenek Motorsport | 33 | (Czech Republic) Jakub Knoll | | All |
| (Spain) iQuick Valencia | 34 | (Denmark) Johan Jokinen | | 1-2 |
| (Spain) iQuick Valencia | 34 | (Italy) Marco Betti | | 3, 5 |
| (Spain) iQuick Valencia | 34 | (Italy) Federico Scionti | J | 4 |
| (Spain) iQuick Valencia | 34 | (Spain) Jordi Cunill | J | 7 |
| (Spain) iQuick Valencia | 35 | (Germany) Patrick Kronenberger | | 1–5 |
| (Spain) iQuick Valencia | 35 | (France) Tristan Vautier | | 7 |
| (Italy) One Racing | 36 | (Italy) Daniel Mancinelli | | 1–3, 5 |
| (Italy) One Racing | 37 | (Italy) Federico Scionti | | 1–3, 5 |
| (Switzerland) Jenzer Motorsport | 50 | (Spain) Genís Olivé | J | All |
| (Switzerland) Jenzer Motorsport | 51 | (Switzerland) Nico Müller | J | All |
| (Switzerland) Jenzer Motorsport | 53 | (Switzerland) Fabien Thuner | | 1–6 |
| (Switzerland) Jenzer Motorsport | 53 | (Russia) Maxim Zimin | J | 7 |
| (France) Pole Services | 55 | (France) Benjamin Lariche | | 1, 6–7 |
| (France) Pole Services | 58 | (France) Arno Santamato | J | 5 |
| (Germany) SL Formula Racing | 61 | (Germany) Julian Eisenreich | J | 6 |

| Icon | Class |
|---|---|
| J | Junior Class |

== Race calendar ==
| Round | | Circuit | Date | Pole position | Fastest lap | Winning driver | Winning team |
|---|---|---|---|---|---|---|---|
| 1 | R1 | (Spain) Circuit de Catalunya, Barcelona | 18 April | (Spain) Albert Costa | (Spain) Albert Costa | (France) Nathanaël Berthon | (Spain) Epsilon Euskadi |
| 1 | R2 | (Spain) Circuit de Catalunya, Barcelona | 19 April | (Spain) Albert Costa | (Spain) Albert Costa | (Spain) Albert Costa | (Spain) Epsilon Euskadi |
| 2 | R1 | (Belgium) Circuit de Spa-Francorchamps | 2 May | (Spain) Albert Costa | (Spain) Albert Costa | (Spain) Albert Costa | (Spain) Epsilon Euskadi |
| 2 | R2 | (Belgium) Circuit de Spa-Francorchamps | 3 May | (Spain) Albert Costa | (Spain) Albert Costa | (Spain) Albert Costa | (Spain) Epsilon Euskadi |
| 3 | R1 | (Hungary) Hungaroring | 13 June | (France) Jean-Éric Vergne | (France) Jean-Éric Vergne | (France) Jean-Éric Vergne | (France) SG Formula |
| 3 | R2 | (Hungary) Hungaroring | 14 June | (United Kingdom) Adrian Quaife-Hobbs | (Denmark) Kevin Magnussen | (United Kingdom) Adrian Quaife-Hobbs | (Germany) Motopark Academy |
| 4 | R1 | (United Kingdom) Silverstone Circuit | 4 July | (France) Jean-Éric Vergne | (Portugal) António Félix da Costa | (Portugal) António Félix da Costa | (Germany) Motopark Academy |
| 4 | R2 | (United Kingdom) Silverstone Circuit | 5 July | (France) Jean-Éric Vergne | (Spain) Albert Costa | (France) Jean-Éric Vergne | (France) SG Formula |
| 5 | R1 | (France) Bugatti Circuit, Le Mans | 18 July | (France) Jean-Éric Vergne | (France) Jean-Éric Vergne | (France) Jean-Éric Vergne | (France) SG Formula |
| 5 | R2 | (France) Bugatti Circuit, Le Mans | 19 July | (France) Jean-Éric Vergne | (Portugal) António Félix da Costa | (France) Jean-Éric Vergne | (France) SG Formula |
| 6 | R1 | (Germany) Nürburgring | 19 September | (Spain) Albert Costa | (Spain) Albert Costa | (Spain) Albert Costa | (Spain) Epsilon Euskadi |
| 6 | R2 | (Germany) Nürburgring | 20 September | (Spain) Albert Costa | (Spain) Albert Costa | (Spain) Albert Costa | (Spain) Epsilon Euskadi |
| 7 | R1 | (Spain) Ciudad del Motor de Aragón, Alcañiz | 24 October | (Portugal) António Félix da Costa | (Portugal) António Félix da Costa | (Portugal) António Félix da Costa | (Germany) Motopark Academy |
| 7 | R2 | (Spain) Ciudad del Motor de Aragón, Alcañiz | 25 October | (Portugal) António Félix da Costa | (Italy) Federico Scionti | (Portugal) António Félix da Costa | (Germany) Motopark Academy |

== Championship standings ==
=== Drivers ===
Points are awarded to the drivers as follows:

| Position | 1 | 2 | 3 | 4 | 5 | 6 | 7 | 8 | 9 | 10 | PP* |
|---|---|---|---|---|---|---|---|---|---|---|---|
| Points | 15 | 12 | 10 | 8 | 6 | 5 | 4 | 3 | 2 | 1 | 1 |

* – only awarded to race one polesitters

| Pos | Driver | CAT (Spain) | | SPA (Belgium) | | HUN (Hungary) | | SIL (United Kingdom) | | LMS (France) | | NÜR (Germany) | | ARA (Spain) | | Points |
| Pos | Driver | 1 | 2 | 3 | 4 | 5 | 6 | 7 | 8 | 9 | 10 | 11 | 12 | 13 | 14 | Points |
|---|---|---|---|---|---|---|---|---|---|---|---|---|---|---|---|---|
| 1 | (Spain) Albert Costa | **DSQ** | **1** | **1** | **1** | Ret | 2 | 2 | Ret | 2 | Ret | **1** | **1** | 2 | 3 | 138 |
| 2 | (France) Jean-Éric Vergne | Ret | 23† | 3 | 8 | **1** | 7 | **3** | **1** | **1** | **1** | 3 | 2 | 3 | 6 | 128 |
| 3 | (Portugal) António Félix da Costa **J** | 3 | 2 | 2 | 2 | 4 | 5 | 1 | Ret | 3 | 2 | DSQ | DSQ | **1** | **1** | 128 |
| 4 | (United Kingdom) Adrian Quaife-Hobbs | 8 | Ret | 4 | 3 | 6 | **1** | 9 | 3 | 14 | 6 | 4 | 9 | 6 | 4 | 83 |
| 5 | (Spain) Miki Monrás **J** | 5 | 3 | Ret | 5 | 3 | 3 | 4 | 6 | 5 | 7 | Ret | 4 | 12 | 9 | 76 |
| 6 | (France) Nathanaël Berthon | 1 | Ret | 7 | 6 | 2 | 24† | 8 | 8 | 6 | 4 | Ret | 7 | 9 | 7 | 67 |
| 7 | (Denmark) Kevin Magnussen **J** | Ret | Ret | 5 | 4 | 16 | 21 | 6 | 10 | 7 | 3 | DSQ | DSQ | 4 | 5 | 50 |
| 8 | (Colombia) Carlos Muñoz **J** | 9 | Ret | 8 | Ret | 5 | Ret | 5 | 9 | 8 | 10 | Ret | 3 | 11 | 10 | 36 |
| 9 | (Poland) Kuba Giermaziak | | | | | Ret | 4 | | | 11 | 8 | 2 | 6 | 8 | Ret | 32 |
| 10 | (France) Arthur Pic **J** | 20 | 7 | 10 | 9 | 12 | 14 | 7 | 4 | 4 | Ret | 13 | Ret | 13 | 14 | 27 |
| 11 | (Switzerland) Nico Müller **J** | 2 | 22† | 17 | 10 | 7 | 9 | 15 | 11 | 17 | Ret | 5 | 11 | 24 | 12 | 25 |
| 12 | (United Arab Emirates) Ramez Azzam **J** | | | | | 8 | 10 | 11 | 7 | 9 | 5 | Ret | Ret | DNS | DNS | 16 |
| 13 | (Czech Republic) Adam Kout | 12 | 8 | 19 | Ret | 11 | 11 | Ret | 2 | 13 | 14 | 19 | 15 | 21 | 15 | 15 |
| 14 | (Germany) Patrick Kronenberger | 10 | 4 | 12 | 11 | 21 | 6 | 14 | 13 | 10 | Ret | | | 15 | Ret | 15 |
| 15 | (Denmark) Marco Sørensen | 14 | Ret | 9 | 15 | DSQ | DSQ | 10 | Ret | 20 | 12 | 6 | 8 | 18 | 8 | 15 |
| 16 | (United Kingdom) Luciano Bacheta | 6 | Ret | 15 | 12 | | | 16 | 14 | 12 | 13 | 7 | 12 | 10 | 17 | 11 |
| 17 | (United Kingdom) James Calado | 25† | 5 | 11 | 7 | | | | | 18 | 11 | | | | | 10 |
| 18 | (Spain) Miguel Otegui **J** | | | | | 9 | 23† | 12 | 15 | Ret | 9 | 16 | 5 | Ret | 24† | 10 |
| 19 | (Italy) Daniel Mancinelli | 7 | 6 | 13 | 20 | Ret | Ret | | | 15 | NC | | | | | 9 |
| 20 | (Denmark) Johan Jokinen | 4 | Ret | 14 | 14 | | | | | | | | | | | 8 |
| 21 | (Italy) Federico Scionti **J** | 19 | 18 | 31 | Ret | 19 | 25 | 17 | 21 | 25 | Ret | | | 5 | 11 | 7 |
| 22 | (Finland) Matias Laine | | | | | | | Ret | 5 | 26 | 20 | | | | | 6 |
| 23 | (Netherlands) Nigel Melker | 15 | 16 | 6 | Ret | 22† | 18 | Ret | 12 | Ret | Ret | | | | | 5 |
| 24 | (France) Hugo Valente **J** | Ret | 10 | 28 | 21 | 10 | 12 | 13 | 18 | 23 | 17 | 8 | Ret | Ret | 19 | 5 |
| 25 | (Netherlands) Daniël de Jong **J** | 11 | 21 | 18 | 19 | Ret | 8 | Ret | Ret | Ret | Ret | Ret | Ret | 19 | Ret | 3 |
| 26 | (New Zealand) Dominic Storey | 23 | 9 | 22 | 16 | | | | | | | | | | | 2 |
| 27 | (Brazil) Luís Felipe Derani | | | 20 | Ret | | | 18 | 17 | | | 9 | Ret | | | 2 |
| 28 | (Spain) Genís Olivé **J** | 18 | 12 | 16 | 13 | 13 | 22† | 22 | 16 | 19 | 16 | 11 | 10 | 14 | Ret | 2 |
| 29 | (United Kingdom) Oliver Webb | 13 | 11 | | | | | | | 21 | 21 | | | | | 0 |
| 30 | (Sweden) Kevin Kleveros **J** | 17 | 14 | 29 | 27 | 17 | 15 | 21 | Ret | 27 | Ret | 14 | 13 | | | 0 |
| 31 | (France) Arno Santamato **J** | Ret | 13 | 23 | 24 | 14 | 17 | | | 24 | Ret | | | | | 0 |
| 32 | (Switzerland) Fabien Thuner | 22 | 19 | 26 | 25 | 15 | 13 | Ret | 19 | 22 | 18 | 17 | 18 | | | 0 |
| 33 | (Estonia) Karl-Oscar Liiv | | | | | | | 19 | 20 | 28 | 19 | 15 | 21 | Ret | 16 | 0 |
| 34 | (United Kingdom) Will Stevens | | | 24 | 22 | | | | | 16 | 15 | | | | | 0 |
| 35 | (France) Benjamin Lariche | 21 | 15 | | | | | | | | | 18 | 17 | 22 | 23 | 0 |
| 36 | (Colombia) Juan Jacobo **J** | 16 | 17 | 21 | 17 | | | | | | | | | | | 0 |
| 37 | (Italy) Marco Betti | | | | | 18 | 16 | | | Ret | 22 | | | | | 0 |
| 38 | (United Kingdom) Adam Christodoulou | | | 25 | 18 | | | | | | | | | | | 0 |
| 39 | (Czech Republic) Jakub Knoll | 24 | 20 | 30 | 26 | 20 | 19 | 20 | 22 | 29 | Ret | 20 | 19 | 20 | 22 | 0 |
| 40 | (Italy) Andrea Roda | | | | | 23 | 20 | | | | | 21 | 20 | 25 | 20 | 0 |
| 41 | (Sweden) Fredrik Blomstedt | | | 27 | 23 | | | | | | | | | | | 0 |
guest drivers ineligible for points
| | (United Kingdom) Dean Smith | | | | | | | | | | | | | 7 | 2 | 0 |
| | (Sweden) Jimmy Eriksson **J** | | | | | | | | | | | 10 | 14 | | | 0 |
| | (Netherlands) Bart Hylkema **J** | | | | | | | | | | | 12 | 22 | | | 0 |
| | (France) Tristan Vautier | | | | | | | | | | | | | 17 | 13 | 0 |
| | (Spain) Jordi Cunill **J** | | | | | | | | | | | | | 16 | 18 | 0 |
| | (Germany) Julian Eisenreich **J** | | | | | | | | | | | 22 | 16 | | | 0 |
| | (Russia) Maxim Zimin **J** | | | | | | | | | | | | | 23 | 21 | 0 |
| Pos | Driver | CAT (Spain) | | SPA (Belgium) | | HUN (Hungary) | | SIL (United Kingdom) | | LMS (France) | | NÜR (Germany) | | ARA (Spain) | | Points |

| Colour | Result |
|---|---|
| Gold | Winner |
| Silver | Second place |
| Bronze | Third place |
| Green | Points classification |
| Blue | Non-points classification |
| Blue | Non-classified finish (NC) |
| Purple | Retired, not classified (Ret) |
| Red | Did not qualify (DNQ) |
| Red | Did not pre-qualify (DNPQ) |
| Black | Disqualified (DSQ) |
| White | Did not start (DNS) |
| White | Withdrew (WD) |
| White | Race cancelled (C) |
| Blank | Did not practice (DNP) |
| Blank | Did not arrive (DNA) |
| Blank | Excluded (EX) |

**Bold** – Pole
Italics – Fastest Lap

† — Drivers did not finish the race, but were classified as they completed over 90% of the race distance.

=== Teams ===
| Pos | Team | Points |
|---|---|---|
| 1 | (Spain) Epsilon Euskadi | 192 |
| 2 | (France) SG Formula | 192 |
| 3 | (Germany) Motopark Academy | 184 |
| 4 | (Switzerland) Jenzer Motorsport | 27 |
| 5 | (Spain) iQuick Valencia | 23 |
| 6 | (Czech Republic) Krenek Motorsport | 15 |
| 7 | (France) Epsilon Sport | 11 |
| 8 | (United Kingdom) Fortec Motorsport | 10 |
| 9 | (Italy) One Racing | 9 |
| 10 | (Netherlands) MP Motorsport | 8 |
| | (Italy) BVM Minardi | 0 |
| | (France) Pole Services | 0 |
| | (Germany) SL Formula Racing | 0 |
