= Albert Costa (racing driver) =

Spanish racing driver

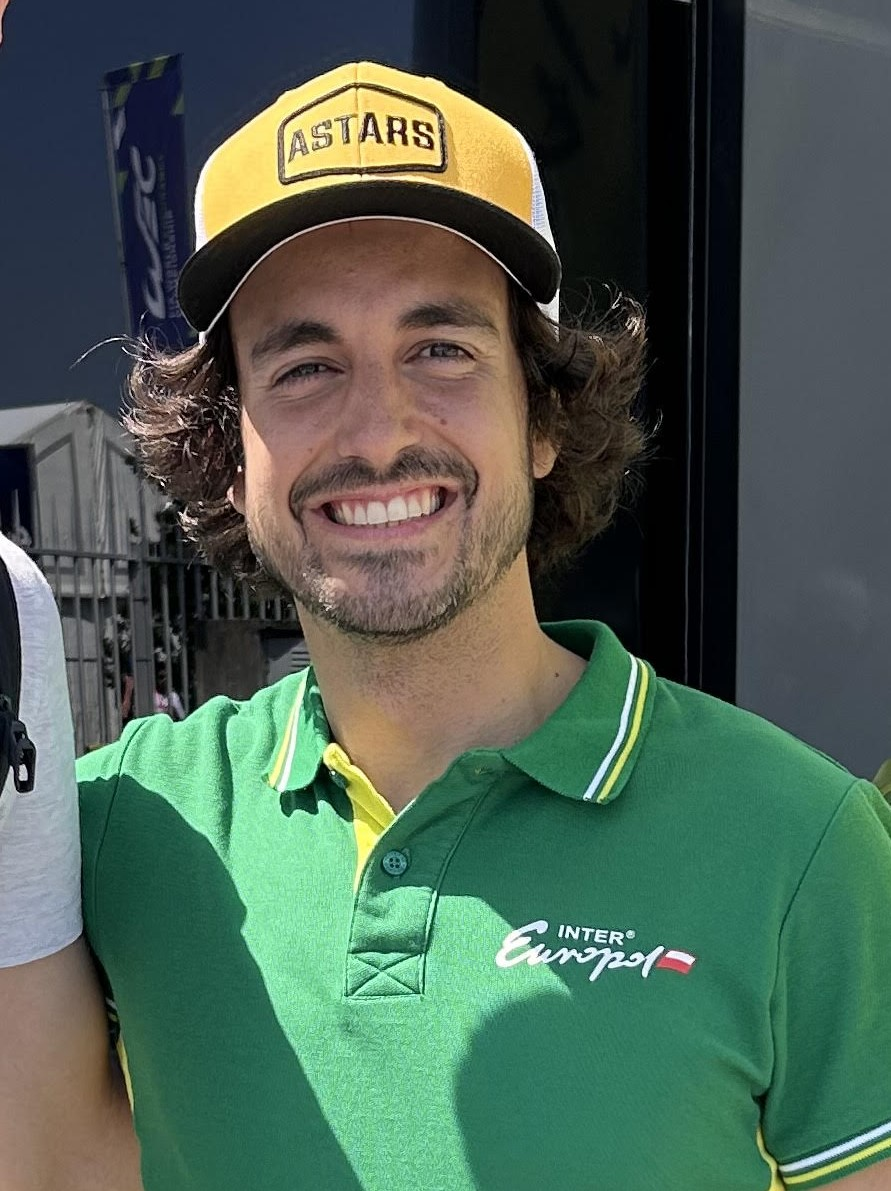
- Costa in 2023
- Nationality: (Spain) Spanish
- Born: Albert Costa Balboa; 2 May 1990 (age 36) Barcelona, Spain

FIA World Endurance Championship career
- Debut season: 2023
- Current team: Inter Europol Competition
- Categorisation: FIA Gold (until 2021); FIA Platinum (2022–)
- Car number: 34
- Starts: 7 (7 entries)
- Wins: 1
- Podiums: 2
- Poles: 0
- Fastest laps: 0
- Best finish: 2nd in in 2023

Previous series
- 2008–09 2008–09 2007: Formula Renault 3.5; Formula Renault 2.0 WEC; Eurocup Formula Renault 2.0; British F3 National Class

Championship titles
- 2009 2009 2012: Eurocup Formula Renault 2.0; Formula Renault 2.0 WEC; Eurocup Mégane Trophy

Fanatec GTWC Europe Sprint Cup career
- Debut season: 2016
- Current team: Emil Frey Racing
- Car number: 69
- Former teams: Orange1 FFF Racing Team
- Starts: 76 (76 entries)
- Championships: 0
- Wins: 2
- Podiums: 29
- Poles: 3
- Best finish: 9th in 2018
- Finished last season: 15th (32 pts)

24 Hours of Le Mans career
- Years: 2023–
- Teams: Inter Europol Competition
- Best finish: 1st in 2023 (LMP2)
- Class wins: 1

Albert Costa Balboa (born 2 May 1990 in Barcelona) is a Spanish racing driver who is competing in the IMSA SportsCar Championship for Conquest Racing. He was the 2009 Eurocup Formula Renault 2.0 champion, and has competed in sports car racing since 2012, including LMP2 class victory in the 2023 24 Hours of Le Mans.

== Career ==
=== Karting ===
Costa started his international karting career in 2004, in the Copa Campeones Trophy for ICA Junior class karts, finishing in seventh position. He continued in the same class in 2005, except for the Copa Campeones Trophy, where he competed in the ICA class. He finished seventh again in that race, adding a seventh in the Spanish ICA Junior Championship, a 27th in the Andrea Margutti Trophy, and 29th in the European Championship. However, Costa excelled himself later in the season, winning the Italian Open Masters. He held off the challenges of Charles Pic and Marcus Ericsson to win the title by nine points. He continued in karting in 2006, but moved into the ICA class full-time. He competed in five different championships over the course of the season, but only finished in the top fifteen in the Asian-Pacific Championship.

=== Formula Three ===
Costa made the substantial leap from karting to Formula Three, missing out on many conventional lower single-seater formulae. He drove for Räikkönen Robertson Racing in the first five rounds of the series, before funds dried up. His best result came during the series' first visit to the Bucharest Ring in Romania, when he finished fourth in class, just over a second behind Hamad Al Fardan, who finished third.

=== Formula Renault ===
After his Formula Three career was cut short by lack of funds, Costa dropped down to Formula Renault to compete in the Eurocup and West European Cup for Epsilon Euskadi. Costa finished eighth in the pan-European series, despite failing to finish on the podium in any of the fourteen races. His best finish was fourth at the Nürburgring and Le Mans. He also recorded the fastest lap during the first race at Estoril. He placed three spots higher in the WEC, finishing fifth overall and runner-up in the rookie standings behind Jean-Éric Vergne.

Costa continued with Epsilon into 2009, again competing in the Eurocup and West European Cup. He won the Eurocup, holding off the challenges of both Vergne and António Félix da Costa, and two weeks later, sealed the WEC title thanks to a double win at the Autódromo Internacional do Algarve. Costa won thirteen of the 28 races he competed in, winning five in the Eurocup and eight in the WEC.

=== Formula Renault 3.5 Series ===
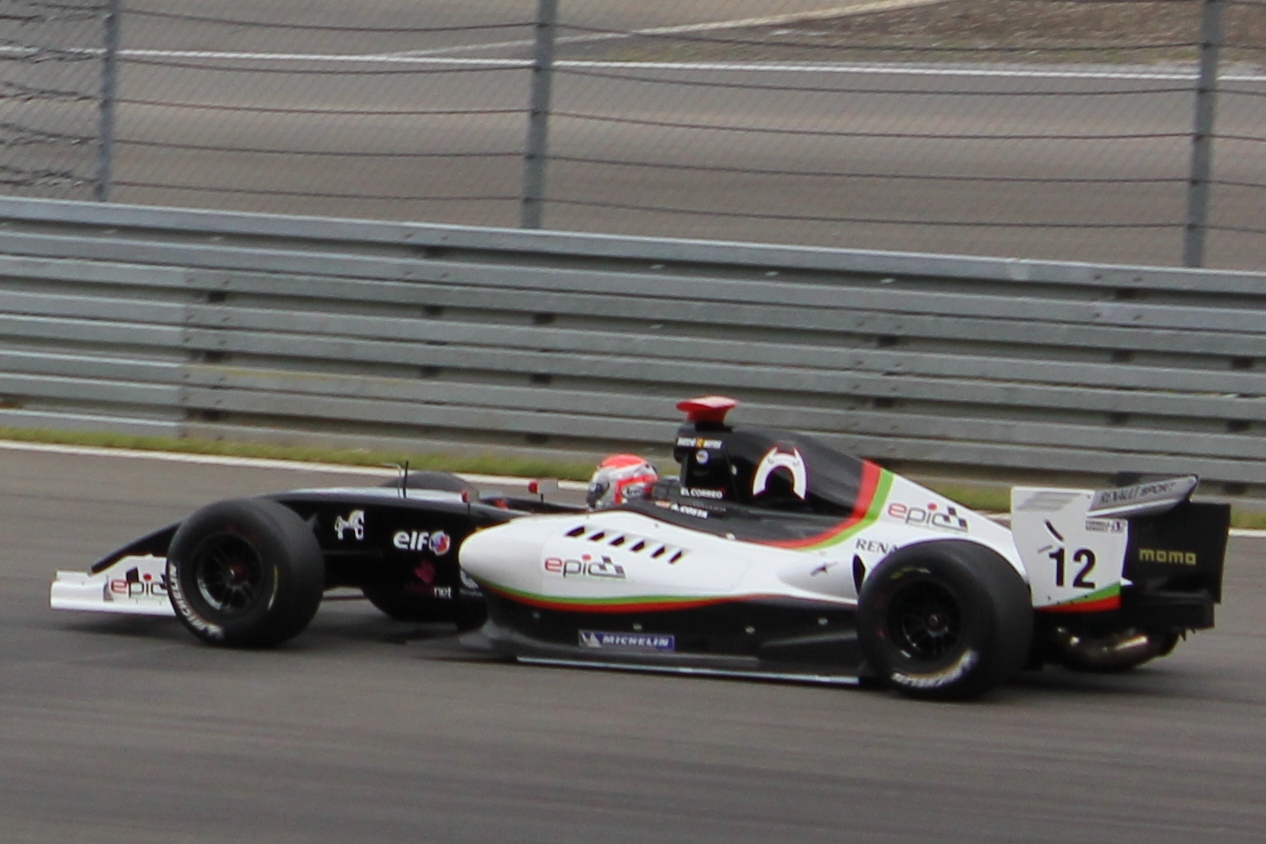
Albert Costa at the 2011 Nürburgring World series by Renault round

After being awarded €500,000 prize money for winning the Eurocup title, Costa graduated to the Formula Renault 3.5 Series in 2010 with Epsilon Euskadi.

=== Eurocup Megane Trophy ===
Costa remained part of the World Series by Renault in 2012 as he switched to Eurocup Megane Trophy with defending champions Oregon. He had hoped to remain on the single-seater ladder, but a budget shortfall necessitated his switch to tin-tops. Costa won the title at his first attempt, scoring seven race victories along the way.

=== Fanatec GT World Challenge Europe AWS Sprint Cup ===
Costa made his debut in the GT World Challenge Europe Sprint Cup after six years in the Endurance Cup with Emil Frey Racing.

Costa would continue with the team in 2023 in the sprint cup racing in the Pro driver category, however, with a new car, the Ferrari 296, after the team ended their contract with the Lamborghini in 2022.

Costa has consistently finished in the top-ten in the first half of the 2023 season but has yet to stand on the podium in the sprint cup.

== Racing record ==
=== Career summary ===
Season	Series	Team	Races	Wins	Poles	F/Laps	Podiums	Points	Position
2007	British Formula 3 International Series – National	Räikkönen Robertson Racing	9	0	0	0	0	33	11th
2008	Formula Renault 2.0 Eurocup	Epsilon Euskadi	14	0	0	1	0	35	8th
2008	Formula Renault 2.0 WEC	Epsilon Euskadi	15	0	1	0	4	85	5th
2009	Formula Renault 2.0 Eurocup	Epsilon Euskadi	14	5	6	6	10	138	**1st**
2009	Formula Renault 2.0 WEC	Epsilon Euskadi	14	8	8	10	9	172	**1st**
2010	Formula Renault 3.5 Series	Epsilon Euskadi	17	0	0	0	3	78	5th
2011	Formula Renault 3.5 Series	EPIC Racing	17	1	1	1	4	151	4th
2012	Eurocup Mégane Trophy	Oregon Team	14	7	8	6	10	251	**1st**
2016	Blancpain GT Series Endurance Cup	Emil Frey Racing	4	0	0	0	0	0	NC
2017	ADAC GT Masters	Callaway Competition	2	0	0	0	0	14	32nd
2017	Blancpain GT Series Endurance Cup	Emil Frey Jaguar Racing	4	0	0	0	0	1	28th
2017	Intercontinental GT Challenge	Emil Frey Jaguar Racing	1	0	0	0	0	0	NC
2017	Blancpain GT Series Sprint Cup	Emil Frey Lexus Racing	2	0	0	0	0	0	NC
2017	International GT Open	Emil Frey Lexus Racing	14	4	4	5	7	98	**3rd**
2018	Blancpain GT Series Endurance Cup	Emil Frey Lexus Racing	5	1	0	0	1	35	9th
2018	Blancpain GT Series Sprint Cup	Emil Frey Lexus Racing	10	0	0	2	0	15.5	13th
2019	Blancpain GT Series Endurance Cup	Orange 1 FFF Racing Team	1	1	0	0	1	25	10th
2019	International GT Open	Emil Frey Racing	14	4	5	1	7	128	**1st**
2020	ADAC GT Masters	GRT Grasser Racing Team	14	0	0	2	1	102	8th
2020	WeatherTech SportsCar Championship – GTD	GRT Grasser Racing Team	1	0	0	0	0	17	55th
2020	GT World Challenge Europe Endurance Cup	Emil Frey Racing	4	0	0	0	0	8	19th
2020	GT World Challenge Europe Sprint Cup	Emil Frey Racing	10	2	1	1	2	60.5	5th
2020	Intercontinental GT Challenge	Emil Frey Racing	1	0	0	0	0	0	NC
2021	ADAC GT Masters	GRT Grasser Racing Team	10	0	1	0	3	103	9th
2021	WeatherTech SportsCar Championship – GTD	GRT Grasser Racing Team	2	0	0	0	0	133	76th
2021	GT World Challenge Europe Endurance Cup	Emil Frey Racing	5	0	0	0	0	16	17th
2021	GT World Challenge Europe Sprint Cup	Emil Frey Racing	10	1	0	1	3	43.5	6th
2021	Intercontinental GT Challenge	Emil Frey Racing	1	0	0	0	0	0	NC
2022	ADAC GT Masters	Emil Frey Racing	14	1	1	2	3	140	4th
2022	GT World Challenge Europe Endurance Cup	Emil Frey Racing	5	0	0	1	1	32	15th
2022	Intercontinental GT Challenge	Emil Frey Racing							
2022	GT World Challenge Europe Sprint Cup	Imperiale Racing	2	0	0	0	0	3	22nd
2022	Stock Car Brasil	Blau Motorsport	1	0	1	1	1	0	NC†
2023	FIA World Endurance Championship – LMP2	Inter Europol Competition	7	1	0	0	3	114	**2nd**
2023	24 Hours of Le Mans – LMP2	Inter Europol Competition	1	1	0	0	1	N/A	**1st**
2023	GT World Challenge Europe Sprint Cup	Emil Frey Racing	10	0	0	1	3	62.5	4th
2023	Deutsche Tourenwagen Masters	Emil Frey Racing	2	0	0	0	0	8	28th
2023	International GT Open	Team Motopark	2	0	0	0	0	0	NC†
2024	European Le Mans Series – LMP2 Pro-Am	Nielsen Racing	3	0	0	0	1	33	10th
2024	IMSA SportsCar Championship – GTD	Conquest Racing	10	1	0	0	3	2577	4th
2024	IMSA SportsCar Championship – GTD Pro	Conquest Racing	1	0	0	0	0	266	37th
2024	GT World Challenge Europe Endurance Cup	Eastalent Racing	1	0	0	0	0	0	NC
2025	IMSA SportsCar Championship – GTD Pro	DragonSpeed	10	1	4	3	6	3192	**2nd**
2026	IMSA SportsCar Championship - GTD	Conquest Racing	10	0	1	2	1	2363	8th
2026	GT World Challenge Europe Endurance Cup	AF Corse	1	0	0	0	0	0	NC†

^{*} Season still in progress.

=== Complete Eurocup Formula Renault 2.0 results ===
(key) (Races in bold indicate pole position) (Races in italics indicate fastest lap)

Year	Entrant	1	2	3	4	5	6	7	8	9	10	11	12	13	14	Pos	Points
2008	Epsilon Euskadi 2	SPA; 1; 5	SPA; 2 Ret	SIL; 1; 8	SIL; 2 Ret	HUN; 1; 7	HUN; 2; 5	NÜR; 1; 30	NÜR; 2; 4	LMS; 1 Ret	LMS; 2; 4	EST; 1; 34	EST; 2; 15	CAT; 1 Ret	CAT; 2 Ret	8th	35
2009	Epsilon Euskadi	**CAT**; **1** DSQ	**CAT**; **2**; 1	**SPA**; **1**; 1	**SPA**; **2**; 1	HUN; 1 Ret	HUN; 2; 2	SIL; 1; 2	SIL; 2 Ret	LMS; 1; 2	LMS; 2 Ret	**NÜR**; **1**; 1	**NÜR**; **2**; 1	ALC; 1; 2	ALC; 2; 3	1st	138

=== Complete Formula Renault 3.5 Series results ===
(key) (Races in bold indicate pole position) (Races in italics indicate fastest lap)

Year	Team	1	2	3	4	5	6	7	8	9	10	11	12	13	14	15	16	17	Pos.	Pts
2010	Epsilon Euskadi	ALC; 1 Ret	ALC; 2; 4	SPA; 1; 4	SPA; 2; 19	MON; 1; 3	BRN; 1; 18	BRN; 2; 10	MAG; 1; 8	MAG; 2; 5	HUN; 1; 6	HUN; 2; 2	HOC; 1; 8	HOC; 2; 17	SIL; 1; 2	SIL; 2; 8	CAT; 1; 5	CAT; 2; 10	5th	78
2011	EPIC Racing	ALC; 1; 4	ALC; 2; 3	SPA; 1; 3	SPA; 2; 5	MNZ; 1; 18	MNZ; 2; 5	MON; 1; 9	NÜR; 1; 5	NÜR; 2; 6	HUN; 1 Ret	HUN; 2; 2	SIL; 1; 5	SIL; 2; 5	LEC; 1 DSQ	LEC; 2; 7	CAT; 1 Ret	**CAT**; **2**; 1	4th	151

=== Complete Eurocup Mégane Trophy results ===
(key) (Races in bold indicate pole position) (Races in italics indicate fastest lap)

Year	Team	1	2	3	4	5	6	7	8	9	10	11	12	13	14	Pos	Points
2012	Oregon Team	**ALC**; **1**; 2	ALC; 2; 3	SPA; 1 Ret	SPA; 2; 3	**NÜR**; **1**; 1	**NÜR**; **2**; 2	**MSC**; **1**; 5	**MSC**; **2**; 1	**HUN**; **1**; 1	HUN; 2; 1	LEC; 1; 1	**LEC**; **2**; 1	CAT; 1 Ret	**CAT**; **2**; 1	1st	251

=== Complete GT World Challenge Europe results ===
==== GT World Challenge Europe Endurance Cup ====
Year	Team	Car	Class	1	2	3	4	5	6	7	Pos.	Points
2016	Emil Frey Racing	Emil Frey GT3 Jaguar	Pro	MNZ; 20	SIL; 43	LEC; 42	SPA; 6H; 17	SPA; 12H; 22	SPA; 24H; 53	NÜR; Ret	NC	0
2017	Emil Frey Racing	Emil Frey GT3 Jaguar	Pro	MNZ; 31	SIL; 10	LEC; 39	SPA; 6H; 46	SPA; 12H; 55	SPA; 24H; Ret	CAT	51st	1
2018	Emil Frey Lexus Racing	Lexus RC F GT3	Pro	MNZ; 17	SIL; 9	LEC; 1	SPA; 6H; 31	SPA; 12H; 20	SPA; 24H; 13	CAT; Ret	9th	35
2019	Orange1 FFF Racing Team	Lamborghini Huracán GT3	Pro	MNZ	SIL	LEC	SPA; 6H	SPA; 12H	SPA; 24H	CAT; 1	10th	25
2020	Emil Frey Racing	Lamborghini Huracán GT3 Evo	Pro	IMO; 18	NÜR; Ret	SPA; 6H; 6	SPA; 12H; 11	SPA; 24H; 31	LEC; 8		19th	8
2021	Emil Frey Racing	Lamborghini Huracán GT3 Evo	Pro	MNZ; 23	LEC; 36	SPA; 6H; 56†	SPA; 12H; Ret	SPA; 24H; Ret	NÜR; 4	CAT; 8	17th	16
2022	Emil Frey Racing	Lamborghini Huracán GT3 Evo	Pro	IMO; 13	LEC; 6	SPA; 6H; 40	SPA; 12H; Ret	SPA; 24H; Ret	HOC; 6	CAT; 3	15th	32
2024	Eastalent Racing	Audi R8 LMS Evo II	Pro	LEC	SPA; 6H	SPA; 12H	SPA; 24H	NÜR; 26	MNZ	JED	NC	0
2026	AF Corse	Ferrari 296 GT3 Evo	Pro	LEC	MNZ	SPA; 6H	SPA; 12H	SPA; 24H	NÜR	ALG; 10	NC‡	0‡

==== GT World Challenge Europe Sprint Cup ====
Year	Team	Car	Class	1	2	3	4	5	6	7	8	9	10	Pos.	Points
2017	Emil Frey Lexus Racing	Lexus RC F GT3	Pro	MIS; QR	MIS; CR	BRH; QR	BRH; CR	ZOL; QR	ZOL; CR	HUN; QR	HUN; CR	NÜR; QR; 22	NÜR; CR; 21	NC	0
2018	Emil Frey Lexus Racing	Lexus RC F GT3	Pro	ZOL; 1 Ret	ZOL; 2; 20	BRH; 1; 11	BRH; 2; 14	MIS; 1; 9	MIS; 2 Ret	HUN; 1; 6	HUN; 2; 13	NÜR; 1; 5	NÜR; 2; 7	13th	15.5
2020	Emil Frey Racing	Lamborghini Huracán GT3 Evo	Pro	MIS; 1; 7	MIS; 2; 5	MIS; 3; 8	MAG; 1 Ret	MAG; 2; 12	ZAN; 1; 4	ZAN; 2; 1	CAT; 1; 1	**CAT**; **2**; 16	CAT; 3; 5	5th	60.5
2021	Emil Frey Racing	Lamborghini Huracán GT3 Evo	Pro	MAG; 1; 2	MAG; 2; 26	ZAN; 1 Ret	ZAN; 2; 1	MIS; 1; 9	MIS; 2; 12	BRH; 1; 16	BRH; 2; 15	VAL; 1; 6	VAL; 2; 3	6th	43.5
2022	Imperiale Racing	Lamborghini Huracán GT3 Evo	Pro	BRH; 1	BRH; 2	MAG; 1	MAG; 2	ZAN; 1	ZAN; 2	MIS; 1; 13	MIS; 2; 7	VAL; 1	VAL; 2	22nd	3
2023	Emil Frey Racing	Ferrari 296 GT3	Pro	BRH; 1; 7	BRH; 2; 23	MIS; 1; 5	MIS; 2; 5	HOC; 1; 4	HOC; 2; 6	VAL; 1; 2	VAL; 2; 3	ZAN; 1; 2	ZAN; 2; 8	4th	62.5

=== Complete ADAC GT Masters results ===
(key) (Races in bold indicate pole position; races in italics indicate fastest lap)

Year	Team	Car	1	2	3	4	5	6	7	8	9	10	11	12	13	14	Pos.	Points
2017	Callaway Competition	Corvette C7 GT3-R	OSC; 1	OSC; 2	LAU; 1	LAU; 2	RBR; 1	RBR; 2	ZAN; 1	ZAN; 2	NÜR; 1; 5	NÜR; 2; 8	SAC; 1	SAC; 2	'HOC; 1	HOC; 2	32nd	14
2020	GRT Grasser Racing Team	Lamborghini Huracán GT3 Evo	LAU; 1; 5	LAU; 2; 27†	NÜR; 1; 10	NÜR; 2; 3	HOC; 1; 5	HOC; 2; 8	SAC; 1; 29†	SAC; 2; 10	RBR; 1; 4	RBR; 2; 3	LAU; 1; 13	LAU; 2; 8	OSC; 1; 12	OSC; 2; 22	8th	102
2021	GRT Grasser Racing Team	Lamborghini Huracán GT3 Evo	OSC; 1; 2	OSC; 2 Ret	**RBR**; **1**; 2	RBR; 2; 4	ZAN; 1; 12	ZAN; 2; 10	LAU; 1; 3	LAU; 2; 5	SAC; 1 Ret	SAC; 2; 11	HOC; 1	HOC; 2	NÜR; 1	NÜR; 2	9th	103
2022	Emil Frey Racing	Lamborghini Huracán GT3 Evo	OSC; 1; 18	OSC; 2; 5	RBR; 1; 6	RBR; 2; 8	ZAN; 1; 12	**ZAN**; **2**; 1^{1}	NÜR; 1; 7	NÜR; 2; 16	LAU; 1; 2	LAU; 2; 2^{3}	SAC; 1; 11	SAC; 2; 7	HOC; 1; 4^{2}	HOC; 2 Ret	4th	140

=== Complete IMSA SportsCar Championship results ===
(key) (Races in bold indicate pole position; races in italics indicate fastest lap)

Year	Entrant	Class	Make	Engine	1	2	3	4	5	6	7	8	9	10	11	12	Rank	Points
2020	GRT Grasser Racing Team	GTD	Lamborghini Huracán GT3 Evo	Lamborghini 5.2 L V10	DAY; 14	DAY	SEB	ELK	VIR	ATL	MOH	CLT	PET	LGA	SEB		55th	17
2021	GRT Grasser Racing Team	GTD	Lamborghini Huracán GT3 Evo	Lamborghini 5.2 L V10	DAY; 19	SEB	MOH	DET	WGL	WGL	LIM	ELK	LGA	LBH	VIR	PET	76th	133
2024	Conquest Racing	GTD	Ferrari 296 GT3	Ferrari F163CE 3.0 L Turbo V6	DAY; 3	SEB; 11	LBH; 12	LGA; 15		WGL; 2	MOS; 11	ELK; 6	VIR; 5	IMS; 19	PET; 1		4th	2577
2024	Conquest Racing	GTD Pro	Ferrari 296 GT3	Ferrari F163CE 3.0 L Turbo V6					DET; 7								29th	266
2025	DragonSpeed	GTD Pro	Ferrari 296 GT3	Ferrari F163CE 3.0 L Turbo V6	DAY; 6	**SEB**; 4	**LGA**; 2	DET; 8	WGL; 3	MOS; 1	**ELK**; 3	**VIR**; 2	IMS; 2	PET; 7			2nd	3192
2026	Conquest Racing	GTD	Ferrari 296 GT3 Evo	Ferrari F163CE 3.0 L Turbo V6	DAY; 14	SEB; 7	LBH; 3	**LGA**; 13	WGL; 6	MOS; 4	ELK; 18	VIR; 7	IMS; 11	PET; 13			8th	2363

=== Complete FIA World Endurance Championship results ===
Year	Entrant	Class	Chassis	Engine	1	2	3	4	5	6	7	Rank	Points
2023	Inter Europol Competition	LMP2	Oreca 07	Gibson GK428 4.2 L V8	SEB; 3	ALG; 9	SPA; 3	LMS; 1	MNZ; 5	FUJ; 9	BHR; 6	2nd	114

=== Complete 24 Hours of Le Mans results ===
Year	Team	Co-Drivers	Car	Class	Laps	Pos.	Class Pos.
2023	(Poland) Inter Europol Competition	(Switzerland) Fabio Scherer (Poland) Jakub Śmiechowski	Oreca 07-Gibson	LMP2	328	9th	**1st**

=== Complete Deutsche Tourenwagen Masters results ===
(key) (Races in bold indicate pole position) (Races in italics indicate fastest lap)

Year	Entrant	Chassis	1	2	3	4	5	6	7	8	9	10	11	12	13	14	15	16	Rank	Points
2023	Emil Frey Racing	Ferrari 296 GT3	OSC; 1	OSC; 2	ZAN; 1; 8	ZAN; 2 Ret	NOR; 1	NOR; 2	NÜR; 1	NÜR; 2	LAU; 1	LAU; 2	SAC; 1	SAC; 2	RBR; 1	RBR; 2	HOC; 1	HOC; 2	28th	8

=== Complete European Le Mans Series results ===
(key) (Races in bold indicate pole position; results in italics indicate fastest lap)

Year	Entrant	Class	Chassis	Engine	1	2	3	4	5	6	Rank	Points
2024	Nielsen Racing	LMP2 Pro-Am	Oreca 07	Gibson GK428 4.2 L V8	CAT; 3	LEC; 5	IMO; 6	SPA	MUG	ALG	10th	33

Sporting positions
Preceded by Valtteri Bottas	Eurocup Formula Renault 2.0; Champion; 2009	Succeeded by Kevin Korjus
Preceded by Daniel Ricciardo	Formula Renault 2.0 WEC; Champion; 2009	Succeeded by None (Series ended)
Preceded by Stefano Comini	Eurocup Mégane Trophy; Champion; 2012	Succeeded by Mirko Bortolotti
Preceded by Mikkel Mac	International GT Open; Champion; 2019; With: Giacomo Altoè	Succeeded by Henrique Chaves; Miguel Ramos
