= 2010 Catalunya GP3 Series round =

Motor racing competition

(Spain) 2010 Spanish GP3 round
Round details
- Round 1 of 8 rounds in the 2010 GP3 Series
- Circuit de Catalunya
- Location: Circuit de Catalunya; Montmeló, Spain
- Course: Permanent racing facility 4.655 km (2.892 mi)

GP3 Series

Race 1
- Date: 8 May 2010
- Laps: 15

Pole position
Driver	(Netherlands) Nigel Melker	RSC Mücke Motorsport
- Time: 1:52.602

Podium
First	(Norway) Pål Varhaug	Jenzer Motorsport
Second	(Canada) Robert Wickens	Status Grand Prix
Third	(Mexico) Esteban Gutiérrez	ART Grand Prix

Fastest lap
Driver	(Spain) Miki Monrás	MW Arden
- Time: 1:48.306 (on lap 6)

Race 2
- Date: 9 May 2010
- Laps: 15

Podium
First	(United States) Alexander Rossi	ART Grand Prix
Second	(Brazil) Lucas Foresti	Carlin
Third	(Mexico) Esteban Gutiérrez	ART Grand Prix

Fastest lap
Driver	(United States) Alexander Rossi	ART Grand Prix
- Time: 1:38.501

The 2010 Catalunya GP3 Series round was a GP3 Series motor race held on May 8 and May 9, 2010, at the Circuit de Catalunya in Montmeló, Spain. It was the first race of the 2010 GP3 Series. The race was used to support the 2010 Spanish Grand Prix.

It was also the first weekend where GP2's feeder formula GP3 made its début. All teams in GP3 use the same GP3/10 chassis and are powered by a four-cylinder 2.0 L (122 cu in) 280 bhp turbocharged engine developed by Renault Sport.

== Classification ==
=== Qualifying ===
Pos	No	Name	Team	Time	Grid
1	10	(Netherlands) Nigel Melker	RSC Mücke Motorsport	1:52.602	1
2	23	(Norway) Pål Varhaug	Jenzer Motorsport	1:52.931	2
3	4	(Canada) Robert Wickens	Status Grand Prix	1:52.974	3
4	6	(Canada) Daniel Morad	Status Grand Prix	1:53.311	4
5	7	(United Kingdom) James Jakes	Manor Racing	1:53.440	5
6	15	(United Kingdom) Dean Smith	Carlin	1:53.600	6
7	2	(Mexico) Esteban Gutiérrez	ART Grand Prix	1:53.603	7
8	28	(France) Jean-Éric Vergne	Tech 1 Racing	1:53.765	8
9	11	(Netherlands) Renger van der Zande	RSC Mücke Motorsport	1:53.914	9
10	24	(Switzerland) Simon Trummer	Jenzer Motorsport	1:53.983	10
11	17	(Brazil) Felipe Guimarães	Addax Team	1:54.159	11
12	14	(United States) Josef Newgarden	Carlin	1:54.329	12
13	8	(Indonesia) Rio Haryanto	Manor Racing	1:54.331	13
14	16	(Brazil) Lucas Foresti	Carlin	1:54.477	14
15	27	(Spain) Daniel Juncadella	Tech 1 Racing	1:54.495	15
16	20	(Denmark) Michael Christensen	MW Arden	1:54.658	16
17	21	(Spain) Miki Monrás	MW Arden	1:54.666	17
18	3	(Brazil) Pedro Nunes	ART Grand Prix	1:54.686	18
19	18	(Mexico) Pablo Sánchez López	Addax Team	1:54.691	19
20	25	(Switzerland) Nico Müller	Jenzer Motorsport	1:54.726	20
21	22	(Brazil) Leonardo Cordeiro	MW Arden	1:54.758	21
22	30	(United Kingdom) Oliver Oakes	ATECH CRS GP	1:54.817	22
23	26	(Romania) Doru Sechelariu	Tech 1 Racing	1:55.069	23
24	29	(Italy) Patrick Reiterer	ATECH CRS GP	1:55.394	24
25	12	(Germany) Tobias Hegewald	RSC Mücke Motorsport	1:55.643	25
26	5	(Russia) Ivan Lukashevich	Status Grand Prix	1:55.927	26
27	9	(United Kingdom) Adrian Quaife-Hobbs	Manor Racing	1:57.082	27
28	1	(United States) Alexander Rossi	ART Grand Prix	2:00.622	28
29	31	(Italy) Vittorio Ghirelli	ATECH CRS GP	2:01.311	29
30	19	(Italy) Mirko Bortolotti	Addax Team	No time	30

=== Feature Race ===
Pos	No	Name	Team	Laps	Time/Retired	Grid	Points
1	23	(Norway) Pål Varhaug	Jenzer Motorsport	15	26:58.573	2	10
2	4	(Canada) Robert Wickens	Status Grand Prix	15	+1.563	3	8
3	2	(Mexico) Esteban Gutiérrez	ART Grand Prix	15	+1.958	7	6
4	15	(United Kingdom) Dean Smith	Carlin	15	+3.446	6	5
5	28	(France) Jean-Éric Vergne	Tech 1 Racing	15	+6.772	8	4
6	24	(Switzerland) Simon Trummer	Jenzer Motorsport	15	+8.734	10	3
7	16	(Brazil) Lucas Foresti	Carlin	15	+13.604	14	2
8	1	(United States) Alexander Rossi	ART Grand Prix	15	+14.208	28	1
9	7	(United Kingdom) James Jakes	Manor Racing	15	+15.874	5	
10	21	(Spain) Miki Monrás	MW Arden	15	+16.628	17	1
11	27	(Spain) Daniel Juncadella	Tech 1 Racing	15	+16.958	15	
12	3	(Brazil) Pedro Nunes	ART Grand Prix	15	+17.750	18	
13	25	(Switzerland) Nico Muller	Jenzer Motorsport	15	+18.814	20	
14	30	(United Kingdom) Oliver Oakes	ATECH CRS GP	15	+20.305	22	
15	11	(Netherlands) Renger van der Zande	RSC Mücke Motorsport	15	+21.773	9	
16	19	(Italy) Mirko Bortolotti	Addax Team	15	+22.066	30	
17	12	(Germany) Tobias Hegewald	RSC Mücke Motorsport	15	+23.168	25	
18	22	(Brazil) Leonardo Cordeiro	MW Arden	15	+28.733	21	
19	5	(Russia) Ivan Lukashevich	Status Grand Prix	15	+29.238	26	
20	8	(Indonesia) Rio Haryanto	Manor Racing	15	+31.131	13	
21	9	(United Kingdom) Adrian Quaife-Hobbs	Manor Racing	14	+1 lap	27	
22	26	(Romania) Doru Sechelariu	Tech 1 Racing	14	+1 lap	23	
NC	29	(Italy) Patrick Reiterer	ATECH CRS GP	11	+4 laps	24	
Ret	14	(United States) Josef Newgarden	Carlin	2	Retired	12	
Ret	18	(Mexico) Pablo Sánchez López	Addax Team	2	Retired	19	
Ret	20	(Denmark) Michael Christensen	MW Arden	2	Retired	16	
Ret	10	(Netherlands) Nigel Melker	RSC Mücke Motorsport	0	Retired	1	
Ret	6	(Canada) Daniel Morad	Status Grand Prix	0	Retired	4	
Ret	17	(Brazil) Felipe Guimarães	Addax Team	0	Retired	11	
DNS	31	(Italy) Vittorio Ghirelli	ATECH CRS GP	0	Did not start	29	

=== Sprint Race ===
Pos	No	Name	Team	Laps	Time/Retired	Grid	Points
1	1	(United States) Alexander Rossi	ART Grand Prix	15	0:27:06.594	1	7
2	16	(Brazil) Lucas Foresti	Carlin	15	+10.535	2	5
3	2	(Mexico) Esteban Gutiérrez	ART Grand Prix	15	+11.005	6	4
4	4	(Canada) Robert Wickens	Status Grand Prix	15	+11.699	7	3
5	15	(United Kingdom) Dean Smith	Carlin	15	+14.154	5	2
6	3	(Brazil) Pedro Nunes	ART Grand Prix	15	+17.082	12	1
7	7	(United Kingdom) James Jakes	Manor Racing	15	+17.537	9	
8	24	(Switzerland) Simon Trummer	Jenzer Motorsport	15	+18.346	3	
9	25	(Switzerland) Nico Muller	Jenzer Motorsport	15	+18.937	13	
10	30	(United Kingdom) Oliver Oakes	ATECH CRS GP	15	+24.906	14	
11	27	(Spain) Daniel Juncadella	Tech 1 Racing	15	+28.248	11	
12	22	(Brazil) Leonardo Cordeiro	MW Arden	15	+30.092	18	
13	12	(Germany) Tobias Hegewald	RSC Mücke Motorsport	15	+30.625	17	
14	10	(Netherlands) Nigel Melker	RSC Mücke Motorsport	15	+30.880	27	
15	18	(Mexico) Pablo Sánchez López	Addax Team	15	+31.398	25	
16	14	(United States) Josef Newgarden	Carlin	15	+31.989	24	
17	29	(Italy) Patrick Reiterer	ATECH CRS GP	15	+34.349	23	
18	20	(Denmark) Michael Christensen	MW Arden	15	+34.685	26	
19	5	(Russia) Ivan Lukashevich	Status Grand Prix	15	+37.257	19	
20	17	(Brazil) Felipe Guimarães	Addax Team	15	+38.196	29	
21	28	(France) Jean-Éric Vergne	Tech 1 Racing	15	+40.869	4	
22	6	(Canada) Daniel Morad	Status Grand Prix	15	+43.081	28	
23	21	(Spain) Miki Monrás	MW Arden	15	+44.023	10	
24	11	(Netherlands) Renger van der Zande	RSC Mücke Motorsport	15	+48.749	15	
25	8	(Indonesia) Rio Haryanto	Manor Racing	15	+56.584	20	
26	9	(United Kingdom) Adrian Quaife-Hobbs	Manor Racing	14	+1 lap	21	
Ret	26	(Romania) Doru Sechelariu	Tech 1 Racing	5	Retired	22	
Ret	23	(Norway) Pål Varhaug	Jenzer Motorsport	0	Retired	8	
Ret	19	(Italy) Mirko Bortolotti	Addax Team	0	Retired	16	
DNS	31	(Italy) Vittorio Ghirelli	ATECH CRS GP	0	Did not start	29	

== Standings after the round ==
Drivers' Championship standings

Pos	Driver	Points
1	(Canada) Robert Wickens	11
2	(Norway) Pål Varhaug	10
3	(Mexico) Esteban Gutiérrez	10
4	(United States) Alexander Rossi	8
5	(United Kingdom) Dean Smith	7

Teams' Championship standings

Pos	Team	Points
1	(France) ART Grand Prix	19
2	(United Kingdom) Carlin	14
3	(Switzerland) Jenzer Motorsport	13
4	(Republic of Ireland) Status Grand Prix	11
5	(France) Tech 1 Racing	4

- Note: Only the top five positions are included for both sets of standings.

== See also ==
- 2010 Spanish Grand Prix
- 2010 Catalunya GP2 Series round

Previous round: none	GP3 Series; 2010 season	Next round: 2010 Istanbul Park GP3 Series round
Previous round: none	Spanish GP3 round	Next round: 2011 Catalunya GP3 Series round
