= 2010 Valencia GP3 Series round =

(Spain) 2010 Valencia GP3 round
Round details
- Round 3 of 8 rounds in the 2010 GP3 Series
- Circuit de Valencia
- Location: Valencia Street Circuit; Valencia, Spain
- Course: Street course 5.34 km (3.32 mi)

GP3 Series

Race 1
- Date: 26 June 2010
- Laps: 14

Pole position
| Driver | (Mexico) Esteban Gutiérrez | ART Grand Prix |
- Time: 1:58.653

Podium
| First | (Mexico) Esteban Gutiérrez | ART Grand Prix |
| Second | (Canada) Robert Wickens | Status Grand Prix |
| Third | (Spain) Roberto Merhi | Atech CRS GP |

Fastest lap
| Driver | (Mexico) Esteban Gutiérrez | ART Grand Prix |
- Time: 1:58:748 (on lap 14)

Race 2
- Date: 27 June 2010
- Laps: 14

Podium
| First | (Switzerland) Nico Müller | Jenzer Motorsport |
| Second | (Spain) Roberto Merhi | Atech CRS GP |
| Third | (United Kingdom) James Jakes | Manor Racing |

Fastest lap
| Driver | (Spain) Roberto Merhi | Atech CRS GP |
- Time: 1:58:845 (on lap 11)

The 2010 Valencia GP3 Series round was a GP3 Series motor race held on June 26 and June 27, 2010, at the Valencia Street Circuit in Valencia, Spain. It was the third round of the 2010 GP3 Series. The race was used to support the 2010 European Grand Prix.

== Classification ==
=== Qualifying ===
| Pos | No | Name | Team | Time | Grid |
|---|---|---|---|---|---|
| 1 | 2 | (Mexico) Esteban Gutiérrez | ART Grand Prix | 1:58.653 | 1 |
| 2 | 29 | (Spain) Roberto Merhi | ATECH CRS GP | 1:58.709 | 5^{1} |
| 3 | 4 | (Canada) Robert Wickens | Status Grand Prix | 1:58.916 | 2 |
| 4 | 20 | (Denmark) Michael Christensen | MW Arden | 1:58.986 | 7^{2} |
| 5 | 28 | (France) Jean-Éric Vergne | Tech 1 Racing | 1:59.041 | 3 |
| 6 | 17 | (Brazil) Felipe Guimarães | Addax Team | 1:59.076 | 9^{3} |
| 7 | 10 | (Netherlands) Nigel Melker | RSC Mücke Motorsport | 1:59.107 | 4 |
| 8 | 8 | (Indonesia) Rio Haryanto | Manor Racing | 1:59.370 | 6 |
| 9 | 21 | (Spain) Miki Monrás | MW Arden | 1:59.385 | 8 |
| 10 | 27 | (Monaco) Stefano Coletti | Tech 1 Racing | 1:59.457 | 13^{4} |
| 11 | 1 | (United States) Alexander Rossi | ART Grand Prix | 1:59.558 | 14^{5} |
| 12 | 26 | (Romania) Doru Sechelariu | Tech 1 Racing | 1:59.589 | 10 |
| 13 | 12 | (Germany) Tobias Hegewald | RSC Mücke Motorsport | 1:59.669 | 11 |
| 14 | 30 | (United Kingdom) Oliver Oakes | ATECH CRS GP | 1:59.817 | 12 |
| 15 | 23 | (Norway) Pål Varhaug | Jenzer Motorsport | 1:59.855 | 15 |
| 16 | 18 | (Mexico) Pablo Sánchez López | Addax Team | 1:59.868 | 19^{6} |
| 17 | 14 | (United States) Josef Newgarden | Carlin | 1:59.946 | 16 |
| 18 | 25 | (Switzerland) Nico Müller | Jenzer Motorsport | 1:59.954 | 17 |
| 19 | 22 | (Brazil) Leonardo Cordeiro | MW Arden | 2:00.049 | 18 |
| 20 | 24 | (Switzerland) Simon Trummer | Jenzer Motorsport | 2:00.059 | 20 |
| 21 | 19 | (Italy) Mirko Bortolotti | Addax Team | 2:00.070 | 21 |
| 22 | 15 | (United Kingdom) Dean Smith | Carlin | 2:00.119 | 25^{7} |
| 23 | 11 | (Netherlands) Renger van der Zande | RSC Mücke Motorsport | 2:00.151 | 22 |
| 24 | 3 | (Brazil) Pedro Nunes | ART Grand Prix | 2:00.258 | 23 |
| 25 | 6 | (Canada) Daniel Morad | Status Grand Prix | 2:00.413 | 28^{8} |
| 26 | 7 | (United Kingdom) James Jakes | Manor Racing | 2:00.542 | 29^{9} |
| 27 | 9 | (United Kingdom) Adrian Quaife-Hobbs | Manor Racing | 2:00.616 | 24 |
| 28 | 5 | (Russia) Ivan Lukashevich | Status Grand Prix | 2:00.729 | 26 |
| 29 | 31 | (Italy) Vittorio Ghirelli | ATECH CRS GP | 2:00.865 | 27 |
| 30 | 16 | (Brazil) Lucas Foresti | Carlin | 2:00.880 | 30^{10} |

Notes

1. - Roberto Merhi, Michael Christensen, Stefano Coletti, Alexander Rossi, Pablo Sánchez López, Dean Smith, Daniel Morad, James Jakes and Lucas Foresti received a three-place grid penalty because of ignoring yellow flags. Felipe Guimarães was penalised for crossing the pit exit line during free practice.

=== Feature race ===
| Pos. | No. | Driver | Team | Laps | Time/Retired | Grid | Points |
|---|---|---|---|---|---|---|---|
| 1 | 2 | (Mexico) Esteban Gutiérrez | ART Grand Prix | 14 | 28:00.338 | 1 | 13 (10+2+1) |
| 2 | 4 | (Canada) Robert Wickens | Status Grand Prix | 14 | +2.484 | 2 | 8 |
| 3 | 29 | (Spain) Roberto Merhi | ATECH CRS GP | 14 | +8.699 | 5 | 6 |
| 4 | 28 | (France) Jean-Éric Vergne | Tech 1 Racing | 14 | +11.634 | 5 | 5 |
| 5 | 21 | (Spain) Miki Monrás | MW Arden | 14 | +12.030 | 8 | 4 |
| 6 | 8 | (Indonesia) Rio Haryanto | Manor Racing | 14 | +20.812 | 6 | 3 |
| 7 | 25 | (Switzerland) Nico Müller | Jenzer Motorsport | 14 | +21.415 | 17 | 2 |
| 8 | 7 | (United Kingdom) James Jakes | Manor Racing | 14 | +23.335 | 29 | 1 |
| 9 | 12 | (Germany) Tobias Hegewald | RSC Mücke Motorsport | 14 | +29.646 | 11 | |
| 10 | 27 | (Monaco) Stefano Coletti | Tech 1 Racing | 14 | +30.534 | 13 | |
| 11 | 23 | (Norway) Pål Varhaug | Jenzer Motorsport | 14 | +32.402 | 15 | |
| 12 | 9 | (United Kingdom) Adrian Quaife-Hobbs | Manor Racing | 14 | +33.021 | 24 | |
| 13 | 24 | (Switzerland) Simon Trummer | Jenzer Motorsport | 14 | +33.624 | 20 | |
| 14 | 18 | (Mexico) Pablo Sánchez López | Addax Team | 14 | +34.886 | 19 | |
| 15 | 3 | (Brazil) Pedro Nunes | ART Grand Prix | 14 | +36.526 | 23 | |
| 16 | 5 | (Russia) Ivan Lukashevich | Status Grand Prix | 14 | +45.654 | 26 | |
| 17 | 15 | (United Kingdom) Dean Smith | Carlin | 14 | +45.871 | 25 | |
| 18 | 19 | (Italy) Mirko Bortolotti | Addax Team | 14 | +48.341 | 21 | |
| 19 | 6 | (Canada) Daniel Morad | Status Grand Prix | 14 | +49.230 | 28 | |
| 20 | 31 | (Italy) Vittorio Ghirelli | ATECH CRS GP | 14 | +52.013 | 27 | |
| 21 | 16 | (Brazil) Lucas Foresti | Carlin | 14 | +53.293 | 30 | |
| Ret | 20 | (Denmark) Michael Christensen | MW Arden | 3 | Retired | 7 | |
| Ret | 1 | (United States) Alexander Rossi | ART Grand Prix | 0 | Retired | 14 | |
| Ret | 10 | (Netherlands) Nigel Melker | RSC Mücke Motorsport | 0 | Retired | 4 | |
| Ret | 11 | (Netherlands) Renger van der Zande | RSC Mücke Motorsport | 0 | Retired | 22 | |
| Ret | 14 | (United States) Josef Newgarden | Carlin | 0 | Retired | 16 | |
| Ret | 17 | (Brazil) Felipe Guimarães | Addax Team | 0 | Retired | 9 | |
| Ret | 22 | (Brazil) Leonardo Cordeiro | MW Arden | 0 | Retired | 18 | |
| Ret | 26 | (Romania) Doru Sechelariu | Tech 1 Racing | 0 | Retired | 10 | |
| Ret | 30 | (United Kingdom) Oliver Oakes | ATECH CRS GP | 0 | Retired | 12 | |
Fastest lap: Esteban Gutiérrez (ART Grand Prix) — 1:58.748 (on lap 14)

=== Sprint race ===
| Pos. | No. | Driver | Team | Laps | Time/Retired | Grid | Points |
|---|---|---|---|---|---|---|---|
| 1 | 25 | (Switzerland) Nico Müller | Jenzer Motorsport | 14 | 28:01.567 | 2 | 6 |
| 2 | 29 | (Spain) Roberto Merhi | ATECH CRS GP | 14 | +3.208 | 6 | 5+1 |
| 3 | 7 | (United Kingdom) James Jakes | Manor Racing | 14 | +6.641 | 1 | 4 |
| 4 | 8 | (Indonesia) Rio Haryanto | Manor Racing | 14 | +15.423 | 3 | 3 |
| 5 | 9 | (United Kingdom) Adrian Quaife-Hobbs | Manor Racing | 14 | +17.054 | 12 | 2 |
| 6 | 27 | (Monaco) Stefano Coletti | Tech 1 Racing | 14 | +18.172 | 10 | 1 |
| 7 | 2 | (Mexico) Esteban Gutiérrez | ART Grand Prix | 14 | +18.779 | 8 | |
| 8 | 23 | (Norway) Pål Varhaug | Jenzer Motorsport | 14 | +24.997 | 11 | |
| 9 | 18 | (Mexico) Pablo Sánchez López | Addax Team | 14 | +26.149 | 14 | |
| 10 | 19 | (Italy) Mirko Bortolotti | Addax Team | 14 | +29.817 | 18 | |
| 11 | 3 | (Brazil) Pedro Nunes | ART Grand Prix | 14 | +31.100 | 15 | |
| 12 | 6 | (Canada) Daniel Morad | Status Grand Prix | 14 | +31.455 | 19 | |
| 13 | 21 | (Spain) Miki Monrás | MW Arden | 14 | +31.598 | 4 | |
| 14 | 20 | (Denmark) Michael Christensen | MW Arden | 14 | +35.706 | 22 | |
| 15 | 10 | (Netherlands) Nigel Melker | RSC Mücke Motorsport | 14 | +37.647 | 26 | |
| 16 | 4 | (Canada) Robert Wickens | Status Grand Prix | 14 | +39.002 | 7 | |
| 17 | 28 | (France) Jean-Éric Vergne | Tech 1 Racing | 14 | +39.118 | 5 | |
| 18 | 17 | (Brazil) Felipe Guimarães | Addax Team | 14 | +41.936 | 29 | |
| 19 | 30 | (United Kingdom) Oliver Oakes | ATECH CRS GP | 14 | +45.869 | 30 | |
| 20 | 26 | (Romania) Doru Sechelariu | Tech 1 Racing | 14 | +46.030 | 24 | |
| 21 | 22 | (Brazil) Leonardo Cordeiro | MW Arden | 14 | +47.519 | 23 | |
| 22 | 31 | (Italy) Vittorio Ghirelli | ATECH CRS GP | 14 | +48.557 | 20 | |
| 23 | 15 | (United Kingdom) Dean Smith | Carlin | 14 | +54.615 | 17 | |
| 24 | 11 | (Netherlands) Renger van der Zande | RSC Mücke Motorsport | 14 | +1:06.160 | 27 | |
| 25 | 5 | (Russia) Ivan Lukashevich | Status Grand Prix | 14 | +1:06.493 | 16 | |
| 26 | 14 | (United States) Josef Newgarden | Carlin | 14 | +1:14.601 | 28 | |
| 27 | 24 | (Switzerland) Simon Trummer | Jenzer Motorsport | 13 | +1 lap | 13 | |
| 28 | 16 | (Brazil) Lucas Foresti | Carlin | 13 | +1 lap | 21 | |
| 29 | 12 | (Germany) Tobias Hegewald | RSC Mücke Motorsport | 12 | +2 laps | 9 | |
| Ret | 1 | (United States) Alexander Rossi | ART Grand Prix | 3 | Retired | 25 | |
Fastest lap: Roberto Merhi (ATECH CRS GP) — 1:58:845 (on lap 11)

== Standings after the round ==
Drivers' Championship standings

| Pos | Driver | Points |
|---|---|---|
| 1 | (Mexico) Esteban Gutiérrez | 35 |
| 2 | (Canada) Robert Wickens | 19 |
| 3 | (United States) Alexander Rossi | 17 |
| 4 | (Switzerland) Nico Müller | 14 |
| 5 | (Indonesia) Rio Haryanto | 13 |

Teams' Championship standings

| Pos | Team | Points |
|---|---|---|
| 1 | (France) ART Grand Prix | 53 |
| 2 | (United Kingdom) Manor Racing | 28 |
| 3 | (Switzerland) Jenzer Motorsport | 27 |
| 4 | (Republic of Ireland) Status Grand Prix | 25 |
| 5 | (United Kingdom) Carlin | 14 |

- Note: Only the top five positions are included for both sets of standings.

== See also ==
- 2010 European Grand Prix
- 2010 Valencia GP2 Series round

| Previous round: 2010 Istanbul Park GP3 Series round | GP3 Series; 2010 season | Next round: 2010 Silverstone GP3 Series round |
| Previous round: none | Valencia GP3 round | Next round: 2011 Valencia GP3 Series round |
