= 2010 Hockenheimring GP3 Series round =

(Germany) 2010 Hockenheimring GP3 round
Round details
- Round 5 of 8 rounds in the 2010 GP3 Series
- The Hockenheimring
- Location: Hockenheimring, Hockenheim, Germany
- Course: Permanent racing facility 4.574 km (2.842 mi)

GP3 Series

Race 1
- Date: 24 July 2010
- Laps: 14

Pole position
Driver	(United States) Josef Newgarden	Carlin
- Time: 1:47.176

Podium
First	(Canada) Robert Wickens	Status Grand Prix
Second	(United States) James Jakes	Manor Racing
Third	(Netherlands) Renger van der Zande	RSC Mücke Motorsport

Fastest lap
Driver	(Canada) Robert Wickens	Status Grand Prix
- Time: 1:33.080 (on lap 15)

Race 2
- Date: 25 July 2010
- Laps: 14

Podium
First	(Mexico) Esteban Gutiérrez	ART Grand Prix
Second	(Spain) Daniel Juncadella	Tech 1 Racing
Third	(Monaco) Stefano Coletti	Tech 1 Racing

Fastest lap
Driver	(Mexico) Esteban Gutiérrez	ART Grand Prix
- Time: 1:31.853 (on lap 14)

The 2010 Hockenheimring GP3 Series round was a GP3 Series motor race held on July 24 and 25, 2010 at Hockenheimring in Hockenheim, Germany. It was the fifth round of the 2010 GP3 Season. The race was used to support the 2010 German Grand Prix.

Robert Wickens took his first GP3 victory in a chaotic Race 1, while dominant championship leader Esteban Gutiérrez took Race 2 honours.

== Classification ==
=== Qualifying ===
Pos	No	Name	Team	Time	Grid
1	7	(United Kingdom) James Jakes	Manor Racing	1:46.559	2
2	4	(Canada) Robert Wickens	Status Grand Prix	1:46.954	3
3	14	(United States) Josef Newgarden	Carlin	1:47.176	1
4	29	(Spain) Roberto Merhi	ATECH CRS GP	1:47.286	4
5	9	(United Kingdom) Adrian Quaife-Hobbs	Manor Racing	1:47.334	6
6	20	(Denmark) Michael Christensen	MW Arden	1:47.422	6
7	28	(Spain) Daniel Juncadella	Tech 1 Racing	1:47.593	9
8	11	(Netherlands) Renger van der Zande	RSC Mücke Motorsport	1:47.639	5
9	8	(Indonesia) Rio Haryanto	Manor Racing	1:47.641	8
10	2	(Mexico) Esteban Gutiérrez	ART Grand Prix	1:47.649	10
11	10	(Netherlands) Nigel Melker	RSC Mücke Motorsport	1:47.800	13
12	24	(Switzerland) Simon Trummer	Jenzer Motorsport	1:47.920	12
13	25	(Switzerland) Nico Müller	Jenzer Motorsport	1:47.927	11
14	27	(Monaco) Stefano Coletti	Tech 1 Racing	1:48.058	14
15	19	(Italy) Mirko Bortolotti	Addax Team	1:48.062	16
16	15	(United Kingdom) Dean Smith	Carlin	1:48.078	15
17	12	(Germany) Tobias Hegewald	RSC Mücke Motorsport	1:48.199	18
18	23	(Norway) Pål Varhaug	Jenzer Motorsport	1:48.245	21
19	1	(United States) Alexander Rossi	ART Grand Prix	1:48.316	19
20	21	(Spain) Miki Monrás	MW Arden	1:48.459	17
21	22	(Brazil) Leonardo Cordeiro	MW Arden	1:48.595	23
22	26	(Romania) Doru Sechelariu	Tech 1 Racing	1:48.866	22
23	6	(Canada) Daniel Morad	Status Grand Prix	1:48.903	24
24	17	(Brazil) Felipe Guimarães	Addax Team	1.48.918	27
25	3	(Brazil) Pedro Nunes	ART Grand Prix	1:48.965	28
26	18	(Mexico) Pablo Sánchez López	Addax Team	1:49.058	20
27	16	(Brazil) Lucas Foresti	Carlin	1:49.186	25
28	30	(United Kingdom) Oliver Oakes	ATECH CRS GP	1:49.246	30
29	5	(Russia) Ivan Lukashevich	Status Grand Prix	1:49.667	29
30	31	(Italy) Vittorio Ghirelli	ATECH CRS GP	1:49.906	26

=== Feature Race ===
Pos	No	Driver	Team	Laps	Time/Retired	Grid	Points
1	4	(Canada) Robert Wickens	Status Grand Prix	17	29:40.963	3	10+1
2	7	(United Kingdom) James Jakes	Manor Racing	17	+2.395	2	8
3	11	(Netherlands) Renger van der Zande	RSC Mücke Motorsport	17	+3.579	5	6
4	2	(Mexico) Esteban Gutiérrez	ART Grand Prix	17	+4.000	10	5
5	27	(Monaco) Stefano Coletti	Tech 1 Racing	17	+11.336	14	4
6	19	(Italy) Mirko Bortolotti	Addax Team	17	+11.903	16	3
7	17	(Brazil) Felipe Guimarães	Addax Team	17	+12.511	27	2
8	28	(Spain) Daniel Juncadella	Tech 1 Racing	17	+20.352	9	1
9	15	(United Kingdom) Dean Smith	Carlin	17	+20.972	15	
10	26	(Romania) Doru Sechelariu	Tech 1 Racing	17	+21.349	22	
11	24	(Switzerland) Simon Trummer	Jenzer Motorsport	17	+21.647	12	
12	23	(Norway) Pål Varhaug	Jenzer Motorsport	17	+23.337	21	
13	30	(United Kingdom) Oliver Oakes	ATECH CRS GP	17	+25.462	30	
14	3	(Brazil) Pedro Nunes	ART Grand Prix	17	+27.096	28	
15	31	(Italy) Vittorio Ghirelli	ATECH CRS GP	17	+32.796	26	
16	29	(Spain) Roberto Merhi	ATECH CRS GP	17	+40.089	4	
17	5	(Russia) Ivan Lukashevich	Status Grand Prix	17	+40.203	29	
18	14	(United States) Josef Newgarden	Carlin	16	+1 lap	1	4
Ret	6	(Canada) Daniel Morad	Status Grand Prix	7	Retired	24	
Ret	12	(Germany) Tobias Hegewald	RSC Mücke Motorsport	6	Retired	18	
Ret	18	(Mexico) Pablo Sánchez López	Addax Team	6	Retired	20	
Ret	8	(Indonesia) Rio Haryanto	Manor Racing	6	Retired	8	
Ret	1	(United States) Alexander Rossi	ART Grand Prix	3	Retired	19	
Ret	20	(Denmark) Michael Christensen	MW Arden	3	Retired	7	
Ret	21	(Spain) Miki Monrás	MW Arden	0	Retired	17	
Ret	22	(Brazil) Leonardo Cordeiro	MW Arden	0	Retired	23	
Ret	16	(Brazil) Lucas Foresti	Carlin	0	Retired	25	
Ret	10	(Netherlands) Nigel Melker	RSC Mücke Motorsport	0	Retired	13	
Ret	25	(Switzerland) Nico Müller	Jenzer Motorsport	0	Retired	11	
DNS	9	(United Kingdom) Adrian Quaife-Hobbs	Manor Racing	0	Did not start	6	

=== Sprint Race ===
Pos	No	Driver	Team	Laps	Time/Retired	Grid	Points
1	2	(Mexico) Esteban Gutiérrez	ART Grand Prix	17	32:14.652	5	6+1
2	28	(Spain) Daniel Juncadella	Tech 1 Racing	17	+0.357	1	5
3	27	(Monaco) Stefano Coletti	Tech 1 Racing	17	+1.110	4	4
4	19	(Italy) Mirko Bortolotti	Addax Team	17	+1.684	3	3
5	4	(Canada) Robert Wickens	Status Grand Prix	17	+6.404	8	2
6	3	(Brazil) Pedro Nunes	ART Grand Prix	17	+7.896	14	1
7	17	(Brazil) Felipe Guimarães	Addax Team	17	+8.635	2	
8	1	(United States) Alexander Rossi	ART Grand Prix	17	+9.532	23	
9	6	(Canada) Daniel Morad	Status Grand Prix	17	+9.880	18	
10	20	(Denmark) Michael Christensen	MW Arden	17	+12.924	22	
11	18	(Mexico) Pablo Sánchez López	Addax Team	17	+14.841	20	
12	15	(United Kingdom) Dean Smith	Carlin	17	+15.583	9	
13	5	(Russia) Ivan Lukashevich	Status Grand Prix	17	+16.593	27	
14	16	(Brazil) Lucas Foresti	Carlin	17	+18.273	28	
15	21	(Spain) Miki Monrás	MW Arden	17	+19.588	30	
16	31	(Italy) Vittorio Ghirelli	ATECH CRS GP	17	+20.708	15	
17	25	(Switzerland) Nico Müller	Jenzer Motorsport	17	+21.804	24	
18	9	(United Kingdom) Adrian Quaife-Hobbs	Manor Racing	17	+24.029	29	
19	14	(United States) Josef Newgarden	Carlin	17	+25.485	17	
20	30	(United Kingdom) Oliver Oakes	ATECH CRS GP	16	+1 lap	13	
Ret	7	(United Kingdom) James Jakes	Manor Racing	13	Retired	7	
Ret	10	(Netherlands) Nigel Melker	RSC Mücke Motorsport	9	Retired	25	
Ret	22	(Brazil) Leonardo Cordeiro	MW Arden	9	Retired	26	
Ret	29	(Spain) Roberto Merhi	ATECH CRS GP	1	Retired	16	
Ret	8	(Indonesia) Rio Haryanto	Manor Racing	1	Retired	19	
Ret	11	(Netherlands) Renger van der Zande	RSC Mücke Motorsport	0	Retired	6	
Ret	12	(Germany) Tobias Hegewald	RSC Mücke Motorsport	0	Retired	21	
Ret	23	(Norway) Pål Varhaug	Jenzer Motorsport	0	Retired	12	
Ret	24	(Switzerland) Simon Trummer	Jenzer Motorsport	0	Retired	11	
DSQ	26	(Romania) Doru Sechelariu	Tech 1 Racing	17	Disqualified	10	

== See also ==
- 2010 German Grand Prix
- 2010 Hockenheimring GP2 Series round

Previous round: 2010 Silverstone GP3 Series round	GP3 Series; 2010 season	Next round: 2010 Hungaroring GP3 Series round
Previous round: none	German GP3 round	Next round: 2011 Nürburgring GP3 Series round
