= 2010 Hungaroring GP3 Series round =

Motor racing competition

(Hungary) 2010 Hungaroring GP3 round
Round details
- Round 6 of 8 rounds in the 2010 GP3 Series
- The Hungaroring
- Location: Hungaroring, Mogyoród, Pest, Hungary
- Course: Permanent racing facility 4.381 km (2.724 mi)

GP3 Series

Race 1
- Date: 31 July 2010
- Laps: 14

Pole position
Driver	(Switzerland) Nico Müller	Jenzer Motorsport
- Time: 1:36.991

Podium
First	(Switzerland) Nico Müller	Jenzer Motorsport
Second	(Mexico) Esteban Gutiérrez	ART Grand Prix
Third	(Monaco) Stefano Coletti	Tech 1 Racing

Fastest lap
Driver	(Mexico) Esteban Gutiérrez	ART Grand Prix
- Time: 1:38.280 (on lap 10)

Race 2
- Date: 1 August 2010
- Laps: 14

Podium
First	(United States) Alexander Rossi	ART Grand Prix
Second	(Canada) Robert Wickens	Status Grand Prix
Third	(United Kingdom) Dean Smith	Carlin

Fastest lap
Driver	(Canada) Robert Wickens	Status Grand Prix
- Time: 1:38.332 (on lap 6)

The 2010 Hungaroring GP3 Series round was a GP3 Series motor race held on July 31 and August 1, 2010, at Hungaroring in Mogyoród, Pest, Hungary. It was the sixth round of the 2010 GP3 Season. The race was used to support the 2010 Hungarian Grand Prix.

Nico Müller took the Race 1 victory, ahead of runaway championship leader Esteban Gutiérrez. Alexander Rossi took his second win of the year in Race 2.

== Classification ==
=== Qualifying ===
Pos	No	Name	Team	Time	Grid
1	25	(Switzerland) Nico Müller	Jenzer Motorsport	1:36.991	1
2	2	(Mexico) Esteban Gutiérrez	ART Grand Prix	1:36.991	2
3	27	(Monaco) Stefano Coletti	Tech 1 Racing	1:37.036	3
4	4	(Canada) Robert Wickens	Status Grand Prix	1:37.066	4
5	15	(United Kingdom) Dean Smith	Carlin	1:37.320	6
6	26	(Romania) Doru Sechelariu	Tech 1 Racing	1:37.370	19
7	6	(Canada) Daniel Morad	Status Grand Prix	1:37.454	5
8	12	(Germany) Tobias Hegewald	RSC Mücke Motorsport	1:37.456	18
9	16	(Portugal) António Félix da Costa	Carlin	1:37.459	7
10	19	(Italy) Mirko Bortolotti	Addax Team	1:37.525	8
11	17	(Brazil) Felipe Guimarães	Addax Team	1:37.632	9
12	9	(United Kingdom) Adrian Quaife-Hobbs	Manor Racing	1:37.639	10
13	1	(United States) Alexander Rossi	ART Grand Prix	1:37.690	11
14	24	(Spain) Marco Barba	Jenzer Motorsport	1:37.694	12
15	10	(Netherlands) Nigel Melker	RSC Mücke Motorsport	1:37.733	22
16	11	(Netherlands) Renger van der Zande	RSC Mücke Motorsport	1:37.777	13
17	14	(United States) Josef Newgarden	Carlin	1:37.785	14
18	23	(Norway) Pål Varhaug	Jenzer Motorsport	1:37.802	15
19	20	(Denmark) Michael Christensen	MW Arden	1:37.869	16
20	29	(Spain) Roberto Merhi	ATECH CRS GP	1:37.952	17
21	21	(Spain) Miki Monrás	MW Arden	1:37.982	21
22	18	(Mexico) Pablo Sánchez López	Addax Team	1:38.196	20
23	30	(United Kingdom) Oliver Oakes	ATECH CRS GP	1:38.342	23
24	7	(France) Adrien Tambay	Manor Racing	1:38.359	25
25	22	(Brazil) Leonardo Cordeiro	MW Arden	1:38.375	27
26	3	(Brazil) Pedro Nunes	ART Grand Prix	1:38.406	24
27	5	(Russia) Ivan Lukashevich	Status Grand Prix	1:38.448	28
28	8	(Indonesia) Rio Haryanto	Manor Racing	1:38.909	26
29	31	(Italy) Vittorio Ghirelli	ATECH CRS GP	1.39.041	29

=== Feature Race ===
Pos	No	Driver	Team	Laps	Time/Retired	Grid	Points
1	25	(Switzerland) Nico Müller	Jenzer Motorsport	16	26:27.400	1	10+2
2	2	(Mexico) Esteban Gutiérrez	ART Grand Prix	16	+1.450	2	8+1
3	27	(Monaco) Stefano Coletti	Tech 1 Racing	16	+14.516	3	6
4	4	(Canada) Robert Wickens	Status Grand Prix	16	+14.856	4	5
5	15	(United Kingdom) Dean Smith	Carlin	16	+18.232	6	4
6	16	(Portugal) António Félix da Costa	Carlin	16	+24.546	7	3
7	14	(United States) Josef Newgarden	Carlin	16	+25.846	14	2
8	1	(United States) Alexander Rossi	ART Grand Prix	16	+25.999	11	1
9	11	(Netherlands) Renger van der Zande	RSC Mücke Motorsport	16	+28.073	13	
10	20	(Denmark) Michael Christensen	MW Arden	16	+29.808	16	
11	19	(Italy) Mirko Bortolotti	Addax Team	16	+31.325	8	
12	9	(United Kingdom) Adrian Quaife-Hobbs	Manor Racing	16	+31.408	10	
13	17	(Brazil) Felipe Guimarães	Addax Team	16	+38.192	9	
14	26	(Romania) Doru Sechelariu	Tech 1 Racing	16	+39.997	19	
15	12	(Germany) Tobias Hegewald	RSC Mücke Motorsport	16	+44.979	18	
16	30	(United Kingdom) Oliver Oakes	ATECH CRS GP	16	+49.818	23	
17	23	(Norway) Pål Varhaug	Jenzer Motorsport	16	+50.904	15	
18	7	(France) Adrien Tambay	Manor Racing	16	+51.827	25	
19	3	(Brazil) Pedro Nunes	ART Grand Prix	16	+52.423	24	
20	8	(Indonesia) Rio Haryanto	Manor Racing	16	+53.564	26	
21	6	(Canada) Daniel Morad	Status Grand Prix	16	+53.995	5	
22	22	(Brazil) Leonardo Cordeiro	MW Arden	16	+54.390	27	
23	10	(Netherlands) Nigel Melker	RSC Mücke Motorsport	16	+54.659	22	
24	31	(Italy) Vittorio Ghirelli	ATECH CRS GP	16	+54.990	29	
25	5	(Russia) Ivan Lukashevich	Status Grand Prix	16	+55.856	28	
Ret	18	(Mexico) Pablo Sánchez López	Addax Team	13	Retired	20	
Ret	24	(Spain) Marco Barba	Jenzer Motorsport	12	Retired	12	
Ret	29	(Spain) Roberto Merhi	ATECH CRS GP	7	Retired	17	
Ret	21	(Spain) Miki Monrás	MW Arden	6	Retired	21	

=== Sprint Race ===
Pos	No	Driver	Team	Laps	Time/Retired	Grid	Points
1	1	(United States) Alexander Rossi	ART Grand Prix	16	26:27.165	1	6
2	4	(Canada) Robert Wickens	Status Grand Prix	16	+4.962	5	5+1
3	15	(United Kingdom) Dean Smith	Carlin	16	+11.159	4	4
4	27	(Monaco) Stefano Coletti	Tech 1 Racing	16	+12.399	6	3
5	2	(Mexico) Esteban Gutiérrez	ART Grand Prix	16	+13.257	7	2
6	25	(Switzerland) Nico Müller	Jenzer Motorsport	16	+15.521	8	1
7	9	(United Kingdom) Adrian Quaife-Hobbs	Manor Racing	16	+18.743	12	
8	19	(Italy) Mirko Bortolotti	Addax Team	16	+24.227	11	
9	7	(France) Adrien Tambay	Manor Racing	16	+29.828	18	
10	30	(United Kingdom) Oliver Oakes	ATECH CRS GP	16	+30.387	16	
11	8	(Indonesia) Rio Haryanto	Manor Racing	16	+39.618	20	
12	6	(Canada) Daniel Morad	Status Grand Prix	16	+40.034	21	
13	22	(Brazil) Leonardo Cordeiro	MW Arden	16	+40.449	22	
14	10	(Netherlands) Nigel Melker	RSC Mücke Motorsport	16	+40.895	23	
15	31	(Italy) Vittorio Ghirelli	ATECH CRS GP	16	+42.572	24	
16	18	(Mexico) Pablo Sánchez López	Addax Team	16	+45.168	26	
17	16	(Portugal) António Félix da Costa	Carlin	16	+46.205	3	
18	5	(Russia) Ivan Lukashevich	Status Grand Prix	16	+46.465	25	
19	24	(Spain) Marco Barba	Jenzer Motorsport	16	+46.934	27	
20	21	(Spain) Miki Monrás	MW Arden	16	+48.691	29	
21	26	(Romania) Doru Sechelariu	Tech 1 Racing	16	+51.086	14	
22	29	(Spain) Roberto Merhi	ATECH CRS GP	16	+52.631	28	
23	23	(Norway) Pål Varhaug	Jenzer Motorsport	16	+1:17.076	17	
Ret	14	(United States) Josef Newgarden	Carlin	13	Retired	2	
Ret	12	(Germany) Tobias Hegewald	RSC Mücke Motorsport	4	Retired	15	
Ret	20	(Denmark) Michael Christensen	MW Arden	2	Retired	10	
Ret	3	(Brazil) Pedro Nunes	ART Grand Prix	1	Retired	19	
Ret	17	(Brazil) Felipe Guimarães	Addax Team	1	Retired	13	
Ret	11	(Netherlands) Renger van der Zande	RSC Mücke Motorsport	0	Retired	9	

== See also ==
- 2010 Hungarian Grand Prix
- 2010 Hungaroring GP2 Series round

Previous round: 2010 Hockenheimring GP3 Series round	GP3 Series; 2010 season	Next round: 2010 Spa-Francorchamps GP3 Series round
Previous round: none	Hungarian GP3 round	Next round: 2011 Hungaroring GP3 Series round
