= 2010 Istanbul Park GP3 Series round =

Motor racing competition

(Turkey) 2010 Turkish GP3 round
Round details
- Round 2 of 8 rounds in the 2010 GP3 Series
- Istanbul Park
- Location: Istanbul Park; Istanbul, Turkey
- Course: Permanent racing facility 5.34 km (3.32 mi)

GP3 Series

Race 1
- Date: 29 May 2010
- Laps: 15

Pole position
| Driver | (Netherlands) Nigel Melker | RSC Mücke Motorsport |
- Time: 1:46.361

Podium
| First | (Mexico) Esteban Gutiérrez | ART Grand Prix |
| Second | (United Kingdom) James Jakes | Manor Racing |
| Third | (Brazil) Felipe Guimarães | Addax Team |

Fastest lap
| Driver | (Mexico) Esteban Gutiérrez | ART Grand Prix |
- Time: 1:47:305 (on lap 9)

Race 2
- Date: 30 May 2010
- Laps: 15

Podium
| First | (Indonesia) Rio Haryanto | Manor Racing |
| Second | (Spain) Miki Monrás | MW Arden |
| Third | (United States) Alexander Rossi | ART Grand Prix |

Fastest lap
| Driver | (Mexico) Esteban Gutiérrez | ART Grand Prix |
- Time: 1:47:511 (on lap 5)

The 2010 Istanbul Park GP3 Series round was a GP3 Series motor race held on May 29 and May 30, 2010, at the Istanbul Park in Istanbul, Turkey. It was the second race of the 2010 GP3 Series. The race was used to support the 2010 Turkish Grand Prix.

== Classification ==
=== Qualifying ===
| Pos | No | Name | Team | Time | Grid |
|---|---|---|---|---|---|
| 1 | 10 | (Netherlands) Nigel Melker | RSC Mücke Motorsport | 1:46.361 | 1 |
| 2 | 2 | (Mexico) Esteban Gutiérrez | ART Grand Prix | 1:46.599 | 2 |
| 3 | 15 | (United Kingdom) Dean Smith | Carlin | 1:46.728 | 3 |
| 4 | 9 | (United Kingdom) Adrian Quaife-Hobbs | Manor Racing | 1:46.823 | 4 |
| 5 | 7 | (United Kingdom) James Jakes | Manor Racing | 1:46.900 | 5 |
| 6 | 6 | (Canada) Daniel Morad | Status Grand Prix | 1:46.931 | 6 |
| 7 | 17 | (Brazil) Felipe Guimarães | Addax Team | 1:46.987 | 7 |
| 8 | 24 | (Switzerland) Simon Trummer | Jenzer Motorsport | 1:47.074 | 8 |
| 9 | 1 | (United States) Alexander Rossi | ART Grand Prix | 1:47.111 | 9 |
| 10 | 12 | (Germany) Tobias Hegewald | RSC Mücke Motorsport | 1:47.163 | 10 |
| 11 | 19 | (Italy) Mirko Bortolotti | Addax Team | 1:47.222 | 11 |
| 12 | 21 | (Spain) Miki Monrás | MW Arden | 1:47.222 | 12 |
| 13 | 25 | (Switzerland) Nico Müller | Jenzer Motorsport | 1:47.226 | 13 |
| 14 | 28 | (France) Jim Pla | Tech 1 Racing | 1:47.238 | 17^{1} |
| 15 | 23 | (Norway) Pål Varhaug | Jenzer Motorsport | 1:47.264 | 14 |
| 16 | 18 | (Mexico) Pablo Sánchez López | Addax Team | 1:47.287 | 19^{2} |
| 17 | 22 | (Brazil) Leonardo Cordeiro | MW Arden | 1:47.393 | 15 |
| 18 | 8 | (Indonesia) Rio Haryanto | Manor Racing | 1:47.449 | 16 |
| 19 | 26 | (Romania) Doru Sechelariu | Tech 1 Racing | 1:47.494 | 18 |
| 20 | 30 | (United Kingdom) Oliver Oakes | ATECH CRS GP | 1:47.506 | 20 |
| 21 | 14 | (United States) Josef Newgarden | Carlin | 1:47.638 | 21 |
| 22 | 4 | (Canada) Robert Wickens | Status Grand Prix | 1:47.665 | 22 |
| 23 | 27 | (Monaco) Stefano Coletti | Tech 1 Racing | 1:47.732 | 26^{3} |
| 24 | 16 | (Russia) Mikhail Aleshin | Carlin | 1:47.884 | 23 |
| 25 | 5 | (Russia) Ivan Lukashevich | Status Grand Prix | 1:47.892 | 24 |
| 26 | 29 | (Italy) Patrick Reiterer | ATECH CRS GP | 1:48.234 | 25 |
| 27 | 3 | (Brazil) Pedro Nunes | ART Grand Prix | 1:48.326 | 27 |
| 28 | 31 | (Italy) Vittorio Ghirelli | ATECH CRS GP | 1:48.552 | 28 |
| 29 | 20 | (Denmark) Michael Christensen | MW Arden | 1:48.857 | 30^{4} |
| 30 | 11 | (Netherlands) Renger van der Zande | RSC Mücke Motorsport | 1:49.171 | 29 |

Notes

1. – Pablo Sánchez López, Stefano Coletti and Jim Pla received a three-place grid penalty because of ignoring yellow flags. Michael Christensen was penalised for remaining on track after technical problems with car.

=== Feature Race ===
| Pos | No | Name | Team | Laps | Time/Retired | Grid | Points |
|---|---|---|---|---|---|---|---|
| 1 | 2 | (Mexico) Esteban Gutiérrez | ART Grand Prix | 15 | 0:26:56.811 | 2 | 11 |
| 2 | 7 | (United Kingdom) James Jakes | Manor Racing | 15 | +10.513 | 5 | 8 |
| 3 | 17 | (Brazil) Felipe Guimarães | Addax Team | 15 | +16.321 | 7 | 6 |
| 4 | 1 | (United States) Alexander Rossi | ART Grand Prix | 15 | +19.423 | 9 | 5 |
| 5 | 6 | (Canada) Daniel Morad | Status Grand Prix | 15 | +22.020 | 6 | 4 |
| 6 | 25 | (Switzerland) Nico Muller | Jenzer Motorsport | 15 | +25.416 | 13 | 3 |
| 7 | 21 | (Spain) Miki Monrás | MW Arden | 15 | +25.586 | 12 | 2 |
| 8 | 8 | (Indonesia) Rio Haryanto | Manor Racing | 15 | +26.615 | 16 | 1 |
| 9 | 26 | (Romania) Doru Sechelariu | Tech 1 Racing | 15 | +28.042 | 18 | |
| 10 | 14 | (United States) Josef Newgarden | Carlin | 15 | +29.953 | 21 | |
| 11 | 4 | (Canada) Robert Wickens | Status Grand Prix | 15 | +37.592 | 22 | |
| 12 | 30 | (United Kingdom) Oliver Oakes | ATECH CRS GP | 15 | +39.103 | 20 | |
| 13 | 20 | (Denmark) Michael Christensen | MW Arden | 15 | +41.188 | 30 | |
| 14 | 29 | (Italy) Patrick Reiterer | ATECH CRS GP | 15 | +48.641 | 25 | |
| 15 | 23 | (Norway) Pål Varhaug | Jenzer Motorsport | 15 | +49.132 | 14 | |
| 16 | 12 | (Germany) Tobias Hegewald | RSC Mücke Motorsport | 15 | +49.441 | 10 | |
| 17 | 31 | (Italy) Vittorio Ghirelli | ATECH CRS GP | 15 | +49.765 | 28 | |
| 18 | 22 | (Brazil) Leonardo Cordeiro | MW Arden | 15 | +53.262 | 15 | |
| 19 | 5 | (Russia) Ivan Lukashevich | Status Grand Prix | 15 | +56.154 | 24 | |
| 20 | 24 | (Switzerland) Simon Trummer | Jenzer Motorsport | 15 | +1:08.306 | 8 | |
| 21 | 18 | (Mexico) Pablo Sánchez López | Addax Team | 15 | +1:12.048 | 19 | |
| 22 | 15 | (United Kingdom) Dean Smith | Carlin | 14 | +1 lap/DNF | 3 | |
| 23 | 10 | (Netherlands) Nigel Melker | RSC Mücke Motorsport | 14 | +1 lap | 1 | |
| 24 | 27 | (Monaco) Stefano Coletti | Tech 1 Racing | 13 | +2 laps/DNF | 26 | |
| 25 | 19 | (Italy) Mirko Bortolotti | Addax Team | 13 | +2 laps/DNF | 11 | |
| Ret | 16 | (Russia) Mikhail Aleshin | Carlin | 12 | Retired | 23 | |
| Ret | 11 | (Netherlands) Renger van der Zande | RSC Mücke Motorsport | 9 | Retired | 29 | |
| Ret | 28 | (France) Jim Pla | Tech 1 Racing | 2 | Retired | 17 | |
| Ret | 3 | (Brazil) Pedro Nunes | ART Grand Prix | 2 | Retired | 27 | |
| Ret | 9 | (United Kingdom) Adrian Quaife-Hobbs | Manor Racing | 0 | Retired | 4 | |

=== Sprint Race ===
| Pos | No | Name | Team | Laps | Time/Retired | Grid | Points |
|---|---|---|---|---|---|---|---|
| 1 | 8 | (Indonesia) Rio Haryanto | Manor Racing | 15 | 0:27:08.058 | 1 | 6 |
| 2 | 21 | (Spain) Miki Monrás | MW Arden | 15 | +2.206 | 2 | 5 |
| 3 | 1 | (United States) Alexander Rossi | ART Grand Prix | 15 | +3.981 | 5 | 4 |
| 4 | 25 | (Switzerland) Nico Muller | Jenzer Motorsport | 15 | +5.613 | 3 | 3 |
| 5 | 6 | (Canada) Daniel Morad | Status Grand Prix | 15 | +6.378 | 4 | 2 |
| 6 | 17 | (Brazil) Felipe Guimarães | Addax Team | 15 | +8.470 | 6 | 1 |
| 7 | 2 | (Mexico) Esteban Gutiérrez | ART Grand Prix | 15 | +8.910 | 8 | 1 |
| 8 | 7 | (United Kingdom) James Jakes | Manor Racing | 15 | +10.439 | 7 | |
| 9 | 26 | (Romania) Doru Sechelariu | Tech 1 Racing | 15 | +11.361 | 9 | |
| 10 | 15 | (United Kingdom) Dean Smith | Carlin | 15 | +16.211 | 22 | |
| 11 | 20 | (Denmark) Michael Christensen | MW Arden | 15 | +22.084 | 13 | |
| 12 | 19 | (Italy) Mirko Bortolotti | Addax Team | 15 | +22.791 | 25 | |
| 13 | 24 | (Switzerland) Simon Trummer | Jenzer Motorsport | 15 | +23.223 | 20 | |
| 14 | 27 | (Monaco) Stefano Coletti | Tech 1 Racing | 15 | +24.548 | 24 | |
| 15 | 12 | (Germany) Tobias Hegewald | RSC Mücke Motorsport | 15 | +25.335 | 16 | |
| 16 | 18 | (Mexico) Pablo Sánchez López | Addax Team | 15 | +28.085 | 21 | |
| 17 | 10 | (Netherlands) Nigel Melker | RSC Mücke Motorsport | 15 | +29.092 | 23 | |
| 18 | 23 | (Norway) Pål Varhaug | Jenzer Motorsport | 15 | +31.600 | 15 | |
| 19 | 3 | (Brazil) Pedro Nunes | ART Grand Prix | 15 | +32.712 | 29 | |
| 20 | 28 | (France) Jim Pla | Tech 1 Racing | 15 | +33.166 | 28 | |
| 21 | 4 | (Canada) Robert Wickens | Status Grand Prix | 15 | +43.815 | 11 | |
| 22 | 16 | (Russia) Mikhail Aleshin | Carlin | 15 | +44.596 | 26 | |
| 23 | 14 | (United States) Josef Newgarden | Carlin | 15 | +48.772 | 10 | |
| 24 | 22 | (Brazil) Leonardo Cordeiro | MW Arden | 15 | +52.998 | 18 | |
| 25 | 29 | (Italy) Patrick Reiterer | ATECH CRS GP | 15 | +1:07.959 | 14 | |
| 26 | 31 | (Italy) Vittorio Ghirelli | ATECH CRS GP | 14 | +1 lap | 17 | |
| 27 | 5 | (Russia) Ivan Lukashevich | Status Grand Prix | 13 | +2 laps | 19 | |
| Ret | 30 | (United Kingdom) Oliver Oakes | ATECH CRS GP | 12 | Retired | 12 | |
| Ret | 9 | (United Kingdom) Adrian Quaife-Hobbs | Manor Racing | 2 | Retired | 30 | |
| Ret | 11 | (Netherlands) Renger van der Zande | RSC Mücke Motorsport | 1 | Retired | 27 | |

== Standings after the round ==
Drivers' Championship standings

| Pos | Driver | Points |
|---|---|---|
| 1 | (Mexico) Esteban Gutiérrez | 22 |
| 2 | (United States) Alexander Rossi | 17 |
| 3 | (Canada) Robert Wickens | 11 |
| 4 | (Norway) Pål Varhaug | 10 |
| 5 | (United Kingdom) James Jakes | 8 |

Teams' Championship standings

| Pos | Team | Points |
|---|---|---|
| 1 | (France) ART Grand Prix | 40 |
| 2 | (Switzerland) Jenzer Motorsport | 19 |
| 3 | (Republic of Ireland) Status Grand Prix | 17 |
| 4 | (United Kingdom) Manor Racing | 15 |
| 5 | (United Kingdom) Carlin | 14 |

- Note: Only the top five positions are included for both sets of standings.

== See also ==
- 2010 Turkish Grand Prix
- 2010 Istanbul Park GP2 Series round

| Previous round: 2010 Catalunya GP3 Series round | GP3 Series; 2010 season | Next round: 2010 Valencia GP3 Series round |
| Previous round: none | Turkish GP3 round | Next round: 2011 Istanbul Park GP3 Series round |
