= 2010 Spa-Francorchamps GP3 Series round =

(Belgium) 2010 Spa-Francorchamps GP3 round
Round details
- Round 7 of 8 rounds in the 2010 GP3 Series
- Spa Francorchamps
- Location: Circuit de Spa-Francorchamps, Francorchamps, Wallonia, Belgium
- Course: Permanent racing facility 7.004 km (4.352 mi)

GP3 Series

Race 1
- Date: 28 August 2010
- Laps: 12

Pole position
Driver	(Spain) Daniel Juncadella	Tech 1 Racing
- Time: 2:17.433

Podium
First	(Canada) Robert Wickens	Status Grand Prix
Second	(Spain) Roberto Merhi	ATECH CRS GP
Third	(United Kingdom) Adrian Quaife-Hobbs	Manor Racing

Fastest lap
Driver	(Switzerland) Nico Müller	Jenzer Motorsport
- Time: 2:13.498

Race 2
- Date: 29 August 2010
- Laps: 12

Podium
First	(France) Adrien Tambay	Manor Racing
Second	(United States) Alexander Rossi	ART Grand Prix
Third	(Spain) Miki Monrás	MW Arden

Fastest lap
Driver	(Switzerland) Nico Müller	Jenzer Motorsport
- Time: 2:13.050

The 2010 Spa-Francorchamps GP3 Series round was a GP3 Series motor race held on August 28 and 29, 2010 at the Circuit de Spa-Francorchamps, near the village of Francorchamps, Wallonia, Belgium. It was the seventh round of the 2010 GP3 Series. The race was run in support of the 2010 Belgian Grand Prix.

Robert Wickens cut championship leader Esteban Gutiérrez's (who did not score a point over the weekend) lead by winning race 1 in torrential conditions, following a tyre gamble. Another clever tyre gamble earned Adrien Tambay a first victory in race 2.

== Classification ==
=== Qualifying ===
Pos	No	Driver	Team	Time	Grid
1	28	(Spain) Daniel Juncadella	Tech 1 Racing	2:17.433	6
2	16	(Portugal) António Félix da Costa	Carlin	2:18.399	8
3	19	(Italy) Mirko Bortolotti	Addax Team	2:18.456	12
4	2	(Mexico) Esteban Gutiérrez	ART Grand Prix	2:18.829	27
5	23	(Norway) Pål Varhaug	Jenzer Motorsport	2:19.300	23
6	8	(Indonesia) Rio Haryanto	Manor Racing	2:19.301	22
7	27	(Monaco) Stefano Coletti	Tech 1 Racing	2:19.421	3
8	4	(Canada) Robert Wickens	Status Grand Prix	2:19.944	1
9	9	(United Kingdom) Adrian Quaife-Hobbs	Manor Racing	2:20.463	2
10	10	(Netherlands) Nigel Melker	RSC Mücke Motorsport	2:20.684	28
11	7	(France) Adrien Tambay	Manor Racing	2:20.694	21
12	6	(Canada) Daniel Morad	Status Grand Prix	2:20.873	4
13	14	(United States) Josef Newgarden	Carlin	2:20.983	5
14	24	(Switzerland) Simon Trummer	Jenzer Motorsport	2:20.983	16
15	30	(United Kingdom) Oliver Oakes	ATECH CRS GP	2:21.136	15
16	1	(United States) Alexander Rossi	ART Grand Prix	2:21.243	19
17	12	(Germany) Tobias Hegewald	RSC Mücke Motorsport	2:21.284	7
18	20	(Denmark) Michael Christensen	MW Arden	2:21.310	9
19	11	(Netherlands) Renger van der Zande	RSC Mücke Motorsport	2:21.803	10
20	29	(Spain) Roberto Merhi	ATECH CRS GP	2:21.899	11
21	31	(Italy) Vittorio Ghirelli	ATECH CRS GP	2:22.006	20
22	26	(Romania) Doru Sechelariu	Tech 1 Racing	2:22.559	25
23	3	(Brazil) Pedro Nunes	ART Grand Prix	2:22.650	29
24	17	(Brazil) Felipe Guimarães	Addax Team	2:23.074	13
25	25	(Switzerland) Nico Müller	Jenzer Motorsport	2:23.315	14
26	21	(Spain) Miki Monrás	MW Arden	2:25.241	26
27	22	(Brazil) Leonardo Cordeiro	MW Arden	2:25.386	17
28	5	(Russia) Ivan Lukashevich	Status Grand Prix	2:26.146	18
29	18	(Mexico) Pablo Sánchez López	Addax Team	2:27.639	24
30	15	(United Kingdom) Dean Smith	Carlin	2:40.128	30

=== Feature Race ===
Pos	No	Driver	Team	Laps	Time/Retired	Grid	Points
1	4	(Canada) Robert Wickens	Status Grand Prix	9	30:10.463	1	10
2	29	(Spain) Roberto Merhi	ATECH CRS GP	9	+0.519	11	8
3	9	(United Kingdom) Adrian Quaife-Hobbs	Manor Racing	9	+4.094	2	6
4	25	(Switzerland) Nico Müller	Jenzer Motorsport	9	+4.215	14	5+1
5	28	(Spain) Daniel Juncadella	Tech 1 Racing	9	+4.957	6	4+2
6	15	(United Kingdom) Dean Smith	Carlin	9	+5.678	30	3
7	3	(Brazil) Pedro Nunes	ART Grand Prix	9	+6.048	29	2
8	24	(Switzerland) Simon Trummer	Jenzer Motorsport	9	+7.740	16	1
9	21	(Spain) Miki Monrás	MW Arden	9	+8.639	26	
10	20	(Denmark) Michael Christensen	MW Arden	9	+10.282	9	
11	12	(Germany) Tobias Hegewald	RSC Mücke Motorsport	9	+10.932	7	
12	10	(Netherlands) Nigel Melker	RSC Mücke Motorsport	9	+11.293	28	
13	1	(United States) Alexander Rossi	ART Grand Prix	9	+24.286	19	
14	22	(Brazil) Leonardo Cordeiro	MW Arden	9	+30.395	17	
15	23	(Norway) Pål Varhaug	Jenzer Motorsport	9	+30.482	23	
16	2	(Mexico) Esteban Gutiérrez	ART Grand Prix	9	+33.957	27	
17	30	(United Kingdom) Oliver Oakes	ATECH CRS GP	9	+1:00.799	15	
18	8	(Indonesia) Rio Haryanto	Manor Racing	9	+1:50.226	22	
Ret	5	(Russia) Ivan Lukashevich	Status Grand Prix	6	Retired	18	
Ret	11	(Netherlands) Renger van der Zande	RSC Mücke Motorsport	6	Retired	10	
Ret	16	(Portugal) António Félix da Costa	Carlin	9	Retired	8	
Ret	19	(Italy) Mirko Bortolotti	Addax Team	5	Retired	12	
Ret	17	(Brazil) Felipe Guimarães	Addax Team	5	Retired	13	
Ret	27	(Monaco) Stefano Coletti	Tech 1 Racing	1	Retired	3	
Ret	18	(Mexico) Pablo Sánchez López	Addax Team	0	Retired	24	
Ret	31	(Italy) Vittorio Ghirelli	ATECH CRS GP	0	Retired	20	
Ret	6	(Canada) Daniel Morad	Status Grand Prix	0	Retired	4	
Ret	26	(Romania) Doru Sechelariu	Tech 1 Racing	0	Retired	25	
Ret	14	(United States) Josef Newgarden	Carlin	0	Retired	5	
Ret	7	(France) Adrien Tambay	Manor Racing	0	Retired	21	

=== Sprint Race ===
Pos	No	Driver	Team	Laps	Time/Retired	Grid	Points
1	7	(France) Adrien Tambay	Manor Racing	12	30:11.408	27	6
2	1	(United States) Alexander Rossi	ART Grand Prix	12	+0.445	13	5
3	21	(Spain) Miki Monrás	MW Arden	12	+1.203	9	4
4	15	(United Kingdom) Dean Smith	Carlin	12	+2.788	3	3
5	9	(United Kingdom) Adrian Quaife-Hobbs	Manor Racing	12	+3.107	6	2
6	25	(Switzerland) Nico Müller	Jenzer Motorsport	12	+6.131	5	1+1
7	2	(Mexico) Esteban Gutiérrez	ART Grand Prix	12	+12.160	16	
8	12	(Germany) Tobias Hegewald	RSC Mücke Motorsport	12	+13.837	11	
9	17	(Brazil) Felipe Guimarães	Addax Team	12	+18.197	30	
10	30	(United Kingdom) Oliver Oakes	ATECH CRS GP	12	+19.794	17	
11	4	(Canada) Robert Wickens	Status Grand Prix	12	+25.499	8	
12	16	(Portugal) António Félix da Costa	Carlin	12	+29.444	19	
13	5	(Russia) Ivan Lukashevich	Status Grand Prix	12	+34.677	21	
14	19	(Italy) Mirko Bortolotti	Addax Team	12	+39.355	22	
15	10	(Netherlands) Nigel Melker	RSC Mücke Motorsport	12	+50.443	12	
16	6	(Canada) Daniel Morad	Status Grand Prix	12	+57.444	24	
17	23	(Norway) Pål Varhaug	Jenzer Motorsport	12	+1:08.290	15	
18	8	(Indonesia) Rio Haryanto	Manor Racing	12	+1:19.228	18	
19	3	(Brazil) Pedro Nunes	ART Grand Prix	12	+1:28.189	2	
20	26	(Romania) Doru Sechelariu	Tech 1 Racing	12	+1:40.900	29	
21	14	(United States) Josef Newgarden	Carlin	12	+1:56.218	25	
22	29	(Spain) Roberto Merhi	ATECH CRS GP	11	+1 lap	7	
23	20	(Denmark) Michael Christensen	MW Arden	11	+1 lap	10	
24	27	(Monaco) Stefano Coletti	Tech 1 Racing	11	+1 lap	23	
25	18	(Mexico) Pablo Sánchez López	Addax Team	11	+1 lap	28	
Ret	24	(Switzerland) Simon Trummer	Jenzer Motorsport	5	Retired	1	
Ret	22	(Brazil) Leonardo Cordeiro	MW Arden	0	Retired	14	
Ret	11	(Netherlands) Renger van der Zande	RSC Mücke Motorsport	0	Retired	20	
Ret	31	(Italy) Vittorio Ghirelli	ATECH CRS GP	0	Retired	26	
DSQ	28	(Spain) Daniel Juncadella	Tech 1 Racing	11	Disqualified	4	

== See also ==
- 2010 Belgian Grand Prix
- 2010 Spa-Francorchamps GP2 Series round

Previous round: 2010 Hungaroring GP3 Series round	GP3 Series; 2010 season	Next round: 2010 Monza GP3 Series round
Previous round: none	Belgian GP3 round	Next round: 2011 Spa-Francorchamps GP3 Series round
