= 2010 Monza GP3 Series round =

Motor race competition

(Italy) 2010 Monza GP3 round
Round details
- Round 8 of 8 rounds in the 2010 GP3 Series
- Autodromo Nazionale Monza
- Location: Autodromo Nazionale Monza, Monza, Italy
- Course: Permanent racing facility 5.793 km (3.6 mi)

GP3 Series

Race 1
- Date: 11 September 2010
- Laps: 16

Pole position
Driver	(Mexico) Esteban Gutiérrez	ART Grand Prix
- Time: 1:43.425

Podium
First	(Mexico) Esteban Gutiérrez	ART Grand Prix
Second	(Canada) Robert Wickens	Status Grand Prix
Third	(Indonesia) Rio Haryanto	Manor Racing

Fastest lap
Driver	(Mexico) Esteban Gutiérrez	ART Grand Prix
- Time: 1:45.131 (on lap 10)

Race 2
- Date: 12 September 2010
- Laps: 16

Podium
First	(Canada) Robert Wickens	Status Grand Prix
Second	(Italy) Mirko Bortolotti	Addax Team
Third	(Switzerland) Nico Müller	Jenzer Motorsport

Fastest lap
Driver	(Brazil) Leonardo Cordeiro	MW Arden
- Time: 1:44.313 (on lap 7)

The 2010 Monza GP3 Series round was a GP3 Series motor race held on September 11 and 12, 2010 at the Autodromo Nazionale Monza, Monza, in Italy. It was the final round in the 2010 GP3 Series. The race was run in support of the 2010 Italian Grand Prix.

== Classification ==
=== Qualifying ===
Pos	No	Driver	Team	Time	Grid
1	2	(Mexico) Esteban Gutiérrez	ART Grand Prix	1:43.425	1
2	11	(Netherlands) Renger van der Zande	RSC Mücke Motorsport	1:43.713	2
3	25	(Switzerland) Nico Müller	Jenzer Motorsport	1:43.788	3
4	12	(Germany) Tobias Hegewald	RSC Mücke Motorsport	1:43.891	4
5	4	(Canada) Robert Wickens	Status Grand Prix	1:43.940	5
6	29	(Spain) Roberto Merhi	ATECH CRS GP	1:43.971	6
7	14	(United States) Josef Newgarden	Carlin	1:43.980	7
8	10	(Netherlands) Nigel Melker	RSC Mücke Motorsport	1:44.040	8
9	6	(Canada) Daniel Morad	Status Grand Prix	1:44.097	9
10	8	(Indonesia) Rio Haryanto	Manor Racing	1:44.109	10
11	7	(United Kingdom) James Jakes	Manor Racing	1:44.170	11
12	17	(Brazil) Felipe Guimarães	Addax Team	1:44.225	12
13	24	(Switzerland) Simon Trummer	Jenzer Motorsport	1:44.370	13
14	3	(Brazil) Pedro Nunes	ART Grand Prix	1:44.422	14
15	30	(United Kingdom) Oliver Oakes	ATECH CRS GP	1:44.460	15
16	26	(Romania) Doru Sechelariu	Tech 1 Racing	1:44.462	16
17	19	(Italy) Mirko Bortolotti	Addax Team	1:44.540	17
18	16	(Brazil) Lucas Foresti	Carlin	1:44.548	18
19	18	(Mexico) Pablo Sánchez López	Addax Team	1:44.560	19
20	9	(United Kingdom) Adrian Quaife-Hobbs	Manor Racing	1:44.609	20
21	23	(Norway) Pål Varhaug	Jenzer Motorsport	1:44.728	21
22	22	(Brazil) Leonardo Cordeiro	MW Arden	1:44.736	22
23	28	(Spain) Daniel Juncadella	Tech 1 Racing	1:44.810	23
24	21	(Spain) Miki Monrás	MW Arden	1:44.898	24
25	20	(Denmark) Michael Christensen	MW Arden	1:44.902	25
26	15	(United Kingdom) Dean Smith	Carlin	1:45.098	26
27	31	(Italy) Vittorio Ghirelli	ATECH CRS GP	1:45.184	27
28	1	(United States) Alexander Rossi	ART Grand Prix	1:45.353	28
29	27	(Monaco) Stefano Coletti	Tech 1 Racing	1:45.378	29
30	5	(Russia) Ivan Lukashevich	Status Grand Prix	1:45.991	30

=== Feature Race ===
Pos	No	Driver	Team	Laps	Time/Retired	Grid	Points
1	2	(Mexico) Esteban Gutiérrez	ART Grand Prix	16	28:26.731	1	10+2+1
2	4	(Canada) Robert Wickens	Status Grand Prix	16	+0.995	5	8
3	8	(Indonesia) Rio Haryanto	Manor Racing	16	+2.104	10	6
4	25	(Switzerland) Nico Müller	Jenzer Motorsport	16	+2.656	3	5
5	19	(Italy) Mirko Bortolotti	Addax Team	16	+3.693	17	4
6	29	(Spain) Roberto Merhi	ATECH CRS GP	16	+4.539	6	3
7	14	(United States) Josef Newgarden	Carlin	16	+4.886	7	2
8	10	(Netherlands) Nigel Melker	RSC Mücke Motorsport	16	+6.923	8	1
9	6	(Canada) Daniel Morad	Status Grand Prix	16	+10.148	9	
10	12	(Germany) Tobias Hegewald	RSC Mücke Motorsport	16	+10.889	4	
11	21	(Spain) Miki Monrás	MW Arden	16	+10.952	24	
12	30	(United Kingdom) Oliver Oakes	ATECH CRS GP	16	+12.102	15	
13	7	(United Kingdom) James Jakes	Manor Racing	16	+13.372	11	
14	23	(Norway) Pål Varhaug	Jenzer Motorsport	16	+13.461	21	
15	20	(Denmark) Michael Christensen	MW Arden	16	+15.945	25	
16	27	(Monaco) Stefano Coletti	Tech 1 Racing	16	+20.674	29	
17	9	(United Kingdom) Adrian Quaife-Hobbs	Manor Racing	16	+21.286	20	
18	18	(Mexico) Pablo Sánchez López	Addax Team	16	+21.426	19	
19	5	(Russia) Ivan Lukashevich	Status Grand Prix	16	+21.938	30	
20	16	(Brazil) Lucas Foresti	Carlin	16	+24.541	18	
21	26	(Romania) Doru Sechelariu	Tech 1 Racing	16	+24.949	16	
22	28	(Spain) Daniel Juncadella	Tech 1 Racing	16	+25.544	23	
23	31	(Italy) Vittorio Ghirelli	ATECH CRS GP	16	+48.201	27	
24	3	(Brazil) Pedro Nunes	ART Grand Prix	16	+1:04.316	14	
Ret	17	(Brazil) Felipe Guimarães	Addax Team	12	Retired	12	
Ret	11	(Netherlands) Renger van der Zande	RSC Mücke Motorsport	10	Retired	2	
Ret	24	(Switzerland) Simon Trummer	Jenzer Motorsport	6	Retired	13	
Ret	22	(Brazil) Leonardo Cordeiro	MW Arden	4	Retired	22	
Ret	15	(United Kingdom) Dean Smith	Carlin	1	Retired	26	
Ret	1	(United States) Alexander Rossi	ART Grand Prix	0	Retired	28	

=== Sprint Race ===
Pos	No	Driver	Team	Laps	Time/Retired	Grid	Points
1	4	(Canada) Robert Wickens	Status Grand Prix	15	26:20.507	7	6
2	19	(Italy) Mirko Bortolotti	Addax Team	15	+1.618	4	5
3	25	(Switzerland) Nico Müller	Jenzer Motorsport	15	+1.939	5	4
4	29	(Spain) Roberto Merhi	ATECH CRS GP	15	+3.040	3	3
5	14	(United States) Josef Newgarden	Carlin	15	+4.430	2	2
6	21	(Spain) Miki Monrás	MW Arden	15	+9.604	11	1
7	6	(Canada) Daniel Morad	Status Grand Prix	15	+12.695	9	
8	22	(Brazil) Leonardo Cordeiro	MW Arden	15	+15.274	28	1
9	30	(United Kingdom) Oliver Oakes	ATECH CRS GP	15	+15.873	12	
10	20	(Denmark) Michael Christensen	MW Arden	15	+17.698	15	
11	12	(Germany) Tobias Hegewald	RSC Mücke Motorsport	15	+18.669	10	
12	18	(Mexico) Pablo Sánchez López	Addax Team	15	+18.860	18	
13	10	(Netherlands) Nigel Melker	RSC Mücke Motorsport	15	+25.415	1	
14	5	(Russia) Ivan Lukashevich	Status Grand Prix	15	+26.612	19	
15	1	(United States) Alexander Rossi	ART Grand Prix	15	+26.664	30	
16	15	(United Kingdom) Dean Smith	Carlin	15	+27.354	29	
17	17	(Brazil) Felipe Guimarães	Addax Team	15	+27.983	25	
18	26	(Romania) Doru Sechelariu	Tech 1 Racing	15	+28.073	21	
19	23	(Norway) Pål Varhaug	Jenzer Motorsport	15	+28.310	14	
20	27	(Monaco) Stefano Coletti	Tech 1 Racing	15	+29.703	16	
21	31	(Italy) Vittorio Ghirelli	ATECH CRS GP	15	+39.337	23	
22	9	(United Kingdom) Adrian Quaife-Hobbs	Manor Racing	15	+1:04.494	17	
23	8	(Indonesia) Rio Haryanto	Manor Racing	14	+1 lap	6	
24	24	(Switzerland) Simon Trummer	Jenzer Motorsport	14	+1 lap	27	
Ret	3	(Brazil) Pedro Nunes	ART Grand Prix	12	Retired	24	
Ret	7	(United Kingdom) James Jakes	Manor Racing	10	Retired	13	
Ret	11	(Netherlands) Renger van der Zande	RSC Mücke Motorsport	4	Retired	26	
Ret	2	(Mexico) Esteban Gutiérrez	ART Grand Prix	3	Retired	8	
Ret	16	(Brazil) Lucas Foresti	Carlin	2	Retired	20	
Ret	28	(Spain) Daniel Juncadella	Tech 1 Racing	1	Retired	22	

== See also ==
- 2010 Italian Grand Prix
- 2010 Monza GP2 Series round

Previous round: 2010 Spa-Francorchamps GP3 Series round	GP3 Series; 2010 season	Next round: 2011 Istanbul Park GP3 Series round
Previous round: none	Italian GP3 round	Next round: 2011 Monza GP3 Series round
