= 2010 Silverstone GP3 Series round =

(United Kingdom) 2010 Silverstone GP3 round
Round details
- Round 4 of 8 rounds in the 2010 GP3 Series
- Silverstone Circuit
- Location: Silverstone Circuit; Northamptonshire, Britain
- Course: Permanent racing facility 5.901 km (3.667 mi)

GP3 Series

Race 1
- Date: 10 July 2010
- Laps: 14

Pole position
Driver	(Mexico) Esteban Gutiérrez	ART Grand Prix
- Time: 1:51.451

Podium
First	(Mexico) Esteban Gutiérrez	ART Grand Prix
Second	(Indonesia) Rio Haryanto	Manor Racing
Third	(Switzerland) Nico Müller	Jenzer Motorsport

Fastest lap
Driver	(Mexico) Esteban Gutiérrez	ART Grand Prix
- Time: 1:53.307

Race 2
- Date: 11 July 2010
- Laps: 14

Podium
First	(Canada) Daniel Morad	Status Grand Prix
Second	(United States) Alexander Rossi	ART Grand Prix
Third	(Mexico) Esteban Gutiérrez	ART Grand Prix

Fastest lap
Driver	(Canada) Daniel Morad	Status Grand Prix
- Time: 1:52.955

The 2010 Silverstone GP3 Series round was a GP3 Series motor race held on July 10 and 11, 2010 at Silverstone Circuit in Silverstone, Britain. It was the fourth round of the 2010 GP3 Series. The race was used to support the 2010 British Grand Prix.

Esteban Gutiérrez extended his series lead with victory in race 1 after taking pole, while Canadian Daniel Morad claimed his first GP3 win in race 2.

== Classification ==
=== Qualifying ===
Pos	No	Name	Team	Time	Grid
1	2	(Mexico) Esteban Gutiérrez	ART Grand Prix	1:51.451	1
2	8	(Indonesia) Rio Haryanto	Manor Racing	1:52.040	2
3	25	(Switzerland) Nico Müller	Jenzer Motorsport	1:52.089	3
4	9	(United Kingdom) Adrian Quaife-Hobbs	Manor Racing	1:52.112	4
5	12	(Germany) Tobias Hegewald	RSC Mücke Motorsport	1:52.152	5
6	1	(United States) Alexander Rossi	ART Grand Prix	1:52.188	6
7	6	(Canada) Daniel Morad	Status Grand Prix	1:52.306	7
8	4	(Canada) Robert Wickens	Status Grand Prix	1:52.312	18
9	7	(United Kingdom) James Jakes	Manor Racing	1:52.316	8
10	15	(United Kingdom) Dean Smith	Carlin	1:52.511	9
11	11	(Netherlands) Renger van der Zande	RSC Mücke Motorsport	1:52.565	10
12	19	(Italy) Mirko Bortolotti	Addax Team	1:52.580	11
13	28	(Spain) Daniel Juncadella	Tech 1 Racing	1:52.581	12
14	20	(Denmark) Michael Christensen	{MW Arden	1:52.614	13
15	27	(Monaco) Stefano Coletti	Tech 1 Racing	1:52.625	14
16	30	(United Kingdom) Oliver Oakes	ATECH CRS GP	1:52.636	15
17	24	(Switzerland) Simon Trummer	Jenzer Motorsport	1:52.643	16
18	23	(Norway) Pål Varhaug	Jenzer Motorsport	1:52.643	17
19	26	(Romania) Doru Sechelariu	Tech 1 Racing	1:52.692	19
20	14	(United States) Josef Newgarden	Carlin	1:52.802	20
21	18	(Mexico) Pablo Sánchez López	Addax Team	1:52.814	21
22	17	(Brazil) Felipe Guimarães	Addax Team	1:52.904	22
23	10	(Netherlands) Nigel Melker	RSC Mücke Motorsport	1:52.906	23
24	29	(Spain) Roberto Merhi	ATECH CRS GP	1:53.072	24
25	21	(Spain) Miki Monrás	MW Arden	1:53.197	25
26	16	(Brazil) Lucas Foresti	Carlin	1:53.256	26
27	31	(Italy) Vittorio Ghirelli	ATECH CRS GP	1:53.456	27
28	3	(Brazil) Pedro Nunes	ART Grand Prix	1:53.590	28
29	22	(Brazil) Leonardo Cordeiro	MW Arden	1:53.697	29
30	5	(Russia) Ivan Lukashevich	Status Grand Prix	1:54.044	30

- Robert Wickens received a ten grid penalty for causing a collision with Esteban Gutierrez in the previous round's Sprint race.

=== Feature Race ===
Pos	No	Driver	Team	Laps	Time/Retired	Grid	Points
1	2	(Mexico) Esteban Gutiérrez	ART Grand Prix	14	26:40.761	1	10+2+1
2	8	(Indonesia) Rio Haryanto	Manor Racing	14	+3.631	2	8
3	25	(Switzerland) Nico Müller	Jenzer Motorsport	14	+10.201	3	6
4	12	(Germany) Tobias Hegewald	RSC Mücke Motorsport	14	+12.329	5	5
5	1	(United States) Alexander Rossi	ART Grand Prix	14	+14.416	6	4
6	15	(United Kingdom) Dean Smith	Carlin	14	+15.399	9	3
7	6	(Canada) Daniel Morad	Status Grand Prix	14	+17.966	7	2
8	19	(Italy) Mirko Bortolotti	Addax Team	14	+18.609	11	1
9	4	(Canada) Robert Wickens	Status Grand Prix	14	+19.186	18	
10	27	(Monaco) Stefano Coletti	Tech 1 Racing	14	+21.440	14	
11	11	(Netherlands) Renger van der Zande	RSC Mücke Motorsport	14	+23.737	10	
12	10	(Netherlands) Nigel Melker	RSC Mücke Motorsport	14	+28.205	23	
13	30	(United Kingdom) Oliver Oakes	ATECH CRS GP	14	+29.315	15	
14	23	(Norway) Pål Varhaug	Jenzer Motorsport	14	+35.808	17	
15	21	(Spain) Miki Monrás	MW Arden	14	+37.213	25	
16	14	(United States) Josef Newgarden	Carlin	14	+41.727	20	
17	24	(Switzerland) Simon Trummer	Jenzer Motorsport	14	+42.438	16	
18	16	(Brazil) Lucas Foresti	Carlin	14	+45.973	26	
19	5	(Russia) Ivan Lukashevich	Status Grand Prix	14	+46.309	30	
20	31	(Italy) Vittorio Ghirelli	ATECH CRS GP	14	+51.229	27	
21	18	(Mexico) Pablo Sánchez López	Addax Team	14	+58.977	21	
Ret	7	(United Kingdom) James Jakes	Manor Racing	11	Retired	8	
Ret	20	(Denmark) Michael Christensen	MW Arden	9	Retired	13	
Ret	22	(Brazil) Leonardo Cordeiro	MW Arden	8	Retired	29	
Ret	28	(Spain) Daniel Juncadella	Tech 1 Racing	8	Retired	12	
Ret	9	(United Kingdom) Adrian Quaife-Hobbs	Manor Racing	7	Retired	4	
Ret	29	(Spain) Roberto Merhi	ATECH CRS GP	3	Retired	24	
Ret	26	(Romania) Doru Sechelariu	Tech 1 Racing	1	Retired	19	
Ret	17	(Brazil) Felipe Guimarães	Addax Team	0	Retired	22	
Ret	3	(Brazil) Pedro Nunes	ART Grand Prix	0	Retired	28	

=== Sprint Race ===
Pos	No	Driver	Team	Laps	Time/Retired	Grid	Points
1	6	(Canada) Daniel Morad	Status Grand Prix	14	26:35.990	2	6+1
2	1	(United States) Alexander Rossi	ART Grand Prix	14	+5.537	4	5
3	2	(Mexico) Esteban Gutiérrez	ART Grand Prix	14	+5.626	8	4
4	25	(Switzerland) Nico Müller	Jenzer Motorsport	14	+6.116	6	3
5	4	(Canada) Robert Wickens	Status Grand Prix	14	+6.869	9	2
6	12	(Germany) Tobias Hegewald	RSC Mücke Motorsport	14	+7.714	5	1
7	11	(Netherlands) Renger van der Zande	RSC Mücke Motorsport	14	+10.872	11	
8	30	(United Kingdom) Oliver Oakes	ATECH CRS GP	14	+16.493	13	
9	23	(Norway) Pål Varhaug	Jenzer Motorsport	14	+19.226	14	
10	14	(United States) Josef Newgarden	Carlin	14	+19.991	16	
11	7	(United Kingdom) James Jakes	Manor Racing	14	+23.871	22	
12	24	(Switzerland) Simon Trummer	Jenzer Motorsport	14	+24.843	17	
13	19	(Italy) Mirko Bortolotti	Addax Team	14	+24.974	1	
14	18	(Mexico) Pablo Sánchez López	Addax Team	14	+28.577	21	
15	20	(Denmark) Michael Christensen	MW Arden	14	+28.748	23	
16	16	(Brazil) Lucas Foresti	Carlin	14	+42.464	18	
17	26	(Romania) Doru Sechelariu	Tech 1 Racing	14	+44.034	28	
18	21	(Spain) Miki Monrás	MW Arden	14	+46.761	15	
19	29	(Spain) Roberto Merhi	ATECH CRS GP	14	+47.572	27	
20	3	(Brazil) Pedro Nunes	ART Grand Prix	14	+48.034	30	
21	31	(Italy) Vittorio Ghirelli	ATECH CRS GP	14	+48.727	20	
22	15	(United Kingdom) Dean Smith	Carlin	14	+50.126	3	
23	17	(Brazil) Felipe Guimarães	Addax Team	14	+57.832	29	
Ret	5	(Russia) Ivan Lukashevich	Status Grand Prix	11	Retired	19	
Ret	22	(Brazil) Leonardo Cordeiro	MW Arden	9	Retired	24	
Ret	27	(Monaco) Stefano Coletti	Tech 1 Racing	8	Retired	10	
Ret	9	(United Kingdom) Adrian Quaife-Hobbs	Manor Racing	4	Retired	26	
Ret	8	(Indonesia) Rio Haryanto	Manor Racing	2	Retired	7	
Ret	28	(Spain) Daniel Juncadella	Tech 1 Racing	2	Retired	25	
Ret	10	(Netherlands) Nigel Melker	RSC Mücke Motorsport	2	Retired	12	

== Standings after the round ==
Drivers' Championship standings

Pos	Driver	Points
1	(Mexico) Esteban Gutiérrez	52
2	(United States) Alexander Rossi	26
3	(Switzerland) Nico Müller	23
4	(Indonesia) Rio Haryanto	21
5	(Canada) Robert Wickens	21

Teams' Championship standings

Pos	Team	Points
1	(France) ART Grand Prix	77
2	(United Kingdom) Manor Racing	36
3	(Switzerland) Jenzer Motorsport	35
4	(Republic of Ireland) Status Grand Prix	35
5	(United Kingdom) Carlin	17

- Note: Only the top five positions are included for both sets of standings.

== See also ==
- 2010 British Grand Prix
- 2010 Silverstone GP2 Series round

Previous round: 2010 Valencia GP3 Series round	GP3 Series; 2010 season	Next round: 2010 Hockenheimring GP3 Series round
Previous round: none	British GP3 round	Next round: 2011 Silverstone GP3 Series round
