= 2011 FIA Formula Two Championship =

Motor racing season

Seasons
- ← 2010 2012 →

The 2011 FIA Formula Two Championship season was the third year of the FIA Formula Two Championship. The championship began on 17 April at Silverstone and finished on 30 October at the Circuit de Catalunya, after eight double-header rounds and all (excluding Silverstone) in support of International GT Open racing weekends.

For most of the season, the championship battle revolved around a returning driver Mirko Bortolotti, who finished fourth in 2009, and rookie driver Christopher Zanella. Bortolotti took the lead after winning in the opening race of the season at Silverstone and led until the end of the season. The Italian secured his title and a prize test for the Williams F1 team in the home race at Monza with two races to spare. Bortolotti scored seven wins in a season matching 2009 Champion Andy Soucek record and with win in 2009 at Brno the Italian took absolute win record in FIA Formula Two Championship.

Zanella finished in second place in the standings with two wins, 123 points behind Bortolotti and just eight ahead of his nearest rival and another newcomer Ramón Piñeiro, who scored three wins. The fourth place went to Piñeiro compatriot and winner of the Silverstone's race Miki Monrás.

== Drivers ==
No.	Driver	Rounds
2	(United Kingdom) James Cole	All
3	(India) Armaan Ebrahim	1–6
4	(Italy) Mirko Bortolotti	All
5	(United Kingdom) Alex Brundle	All
6	(Spain) Miki Monrás	All
8	(Bulgaria) Plamen Kralev	All
9	(Romania) Mihai Marinescu	All
10	(Russia) Max Snegirev	All
11	(United Kingdom) Jack Clarke	All
12	(Netherlands) Kelvin Snoeks	All
13	(Spain) José Luis Abadín	1–3, 5, 8
14	(United Kingdom) Jolyon Palmer	4
15	(Spain) Ramón Piñeiro	All
16	(Denmark) Mikkel Mac	All
17	(United Kingdom) Will Bratt	1–4
18	(Germany) Tobias Hegewald	All
19	(Switzerland) Christopher Zanella	All
20	(Germany) Julian Theobald	1–4, 6–7
21	(Germany) Thiemo Storz	All
22	(Germany) Johannes Theobald	1–4, 6
23	(United Kingdom) Jon Lancaster	2
24	(United Kingdom) Tom Gladdis	1
25	(Austria) René Binder	6
26	(United Kingdom) Luciano Bacheta	6–7
28	(France) Benjamin Lariche	All
30	(South Korea) Tom Mun	All
33	(India) Parthiva Sureshwaren	1, 3–8
42	(United Kingdom) Jordan King	3–5
77	(Poland) Natalia Kowalska	1–2
88	(Brazil) Fabio Gamberini	4

=== Driver changes ===
Entering/Re–Entering FIA Formula Two Championship

- José Luis Abadín graduated from European F3 Open to compete in the championship.
- Mirko Bortolotti, Alex Brundle and Tobias Hegewald all returned to the championship, after competing in other series in 2010. Bortolotti and Hegewald moved back from the GP3 Series, while Brundle will rejoin from British Formula 3.
- James Cole moved into the series from the British Formula 3 National Class. Max Snegirev also joined Formula Two from the Championship Class in British Formula 3.
- Formula Renault NEC runner-up Mikkel Mac moved into Formula Two in 2011.
- Miki Monrás switched from GP3 Series to compete in the championship.
- Sung-Hak Mun joined the championship after racing in Formula BMW Pacific in 2010.
- Thiemo Storz moved into the championship, having missed most of 2010 due to completing his schooling and competing in the last Formula Palmer Audi season.
- After finishing sixth in the Italian Formula Three Championship, Christopher Zanella graduated into Formula Two in 2011.

Leaving FIA Formula Two Championship

- 2010 champion Dean Stoneman had been due to compete with ISR Racing in the Formula Renault 3.5 Series in 2011, but withdrew after being diagnosed with testicular cancer.
- 2010 runner-up Jolyon Palmer graduated to GP2, signing with the Arden International team. Palmer returned to Formula Two at the Nürburgring, in order to gain track time ahead of the GP2 races at the circuit later in the season.
- Sergey Afanasyev, who finished third in 2010 moved to Auto GP with DAMS.

Mid-Season Changes

- Jordan King, Jon Lancaster and Fabio Gamberini joined the series during the season. Lancaster contested the Magny-Cours round, after racing in the Formula Renault 3.5 Series during the 2010 season, while King is combining his Formula Two programme with Formula Renault UK. Gamberini, a front-runner in the European F3 Open series, competed at the Nürburgring.

== Calendar ==
An eight-round calendar was published on 3 November 2010, with an amendment made to the Magny-Cours date on 8 December 2010. The series was not part of the support package of the World Touring Car Championship as it had been since the series' revival. With the exception of the opening round at Silverstone, the championship was a part of International GT Open meetings.

Round		Circuit/Location	Country	Date	Pole position	Fastest lap	Winning driver	Report
1	R1	Silverstone Circuit, Northamptonshire	United Kingdom	16 April	(Italy) Mirko Bortolotti	(Italy) Mirko Bortolotti	(Italy) Mirko Bortolotti	Report
1	R2	Silverstone Circuit, Northamptonshire	United Kingdom	17 April	(Spain) Miki Monrás	(Spain) Miki Monrás	(Spain) Miki Monrás	Report
2	R1	Circuit de Nevers Magny-Cours	France	14 May	(United Kingdom) Alex Brundle	(Switzerland) Christopher Zanella	(Switzerland) Christopher Zanella	Report
2	R2	Circuit de Nevers Magny-Cours	France	15 May	(Switzerland) Christopher Zanella	(Spain) Miki Monrás	(Switzerland) Christopher Zanella	Report
3	R1	Circuit de Spa-Francorchamps	Belgium	25 June	(Spain) Ramón Piñeiro	(Spain) Ramón Piñeiro	(United Kingdom) Will Bratt	Report
3	R2	Circuit de Spa-Francorchamps	Belgium	26 June	(United Kingdom) Will Bratt	(Germany) Tobias Hegewald	(Italy) Mirko Bortolotti	Report
4	R1	Nürburgring	Germany	2 July	(Italy) Mirko Bortolotti	(Italy) Mirko Bortolotti	(Italy) Mirko Bortolotti	Report
4	R2	Nürburgring	Germany	3 July	(Italy) Mirko Bortolotti	(Italy) Mirko Bortolotti	(Italy) Mirko Bortolotti	Report
5	R1	Brands Hatch, Kent	United Kingdom	23 July	(Germany) Tobias Hegewald	(United Kingdom) Jack Clarke	(United Kingdom) Jack Clarke	Report
5	R2	Brands Hatch, Kent	United Kingdom	24 July	(Italy) Mirko Bortolotti	(Spain) Ramón Piñeiro	(Spain) Ramón Piñeiro	Report
6	R1	Red Bull Ring, Spielberg	Austria	27 August	(Spain) Ramón Piñeiro	(Italy) Mirko Bortolotti	(Spain) Ramón Piñeiro	Report
6	R2	Red Bull Ring, Spielberg	Austria	28 August	(Switzerland) Christopher Zanella	(Italy) Mirko Bortolotti	(Spain) Ramón Piñeiro	Report
7	R1	Autodromo Nazionale Monza	Italy	1 October	(Romania) Mihai Marinescu	(Romania) Mihai Marinescu	(Romania) Mihai Marinescu	Report
7	R2	Autodromo Nazionale Monza	Italy	2 October	(Italy) Mirko Bortolotti	(Romania) Mihai Marinescu	(Italy) Mirko Bortolotti	Report
8	R1	Circuit de Catalunya, Montmeló	Spain	29 October	(Italy) Mirko Bortolotti	(Italy) Mirko Bortolotti	(Italy) Mirko Bortolotti	Report
8	R2	Circuit de Catalunya, Montmeló	Spain	30 October	(Italy) Mirko Bortolotti	(Italy) Mirko Bortolotti	(Italy) Mirko Bortolotti	Report

== Championship standings ==
A driver's best 14 scores counted towards the championship, with any other points being discarded.

Pos.	Driver	SIL (United Kingdom)		MAG (France)		SPA (Belgium)		NÜR (Germany)		BRH (United Kingdom)		RBR (Austria)		MNZ (Italy)		CAT (Spain)		Points
1	(Italy) Mirko Bortolotti	**1**	2	6	3	2	1	**1**	**1**	5	**2**	2	2	2	**1**	**1**	**1**	298
2	(Switzerland) Christopher Zanella	7	3	1	**1**	3	2	2	3	6	7	12	**4**	5	6	6	7	189
3	(Spain) Ramón Piñeiro	5	11	5	9	**7**	12	14	10	2	1	**1**	1	4	2	3	2	185
4	(Spain) Miki Monrás	3	**1**	4	4	9	4	4	8	4	9	Ret	11	17	3	2	4	153
5	(Romania) Mihai Marinescu	4	5	Ret	5	8	5	Ret	11	Ret	4	3	3	**1**	Ret	5	3	138
6	(Germany) Tobias Hegewald	6	4	2	8	4	Ret	12	4	**3**	5	15	6	6	9	4	11	121
7	(United Kingdom) Alex Brundle	19	Ret	**3**	2	5	7	Ret	5	Ret	17	4	Ret	3	4	8	5	112
8	(United Kingdom) Jack Clarke	8	6	13	10	19	6	3	7	1	3	5	Ret	8	7	7	9	110
9	(United Kingdom) Will Bratt	2	DSQ	8	7	1	**3**	7	2									92
10	(Netherlands) Kelvin Snoeks	Ret	8	10	Ret	10	9	6	19	Ret	Ret	Ret	5	11	8	9	6	40
11	(Denmark) Mikkel Mac	12	9	15	12	11	14	8	6	13	11	Ret	9	9	11	10	8	23
12	(Germany) Thiemo Storz	14	14	9	15	6	10	9	15	Ret	Ret	Ret	14	7	Ret	11	16	19
13	(United Kingdom) Luciano Bacheta											7	10	10	5			18
14	(United Kingdom) Jordan King					17	8	5	9	Ret	10							17
15	(India) Armaan Ebrahim	11	7	12	Ret	13	20	15	13	9	6	14	Ret					16
16	(France) Benjamin Lariche	13	10	11	13	20	Ret	13	12	Ret	8	8	8	13	10	13	10	15
17	(United Kingdom) Jon Lancaster			7	6													14
18	(Russia) Max Snegirev	9	Ret	16	14	14	13	11	18	7	Ret	11	7	16	Ret	12	12	14
19	(Germany) Julian Theobald	17	Ret	17	Ret	15	15	16	Ret			6	12	Ret	Ret			8
20	(United Kingdom) James Cole	15	13	18	17	16	16	18	14	8	12	9	18	14	15	14	15	6
21	(Germany) Johannes Theobald	Ret	16	14	11	12	Ret	10	Ret			Ret	16					1
22	(Spain) José Luis Abadín	16	18	Ret	16	18	11			10	15					15	13	1
23	(Bulgaria) Plamen Kralev	Ret	17	Ret	18	Ret	18	17	17	12	13	10	15	12	13	16	17	1
24	(United Kingdom) Tom Gladdis	10	15															1
25	(India) Parthiva Sureshwaren	18	Ret			21	19	DNS	Ret	11	14	Ret	17	15	14	17	14	0
26	(South Korea) Sung-Hak Mun	20	19	19	19	Ret	17	19	Ret	14	16	13	19	Ret	12	Ret	DNS	0
27	(Poland) Natalia Kowalska	Ret	12	Ret	20													0
28	(Austria) René Binder											16	13					0
29	(Brazil) Fabio Gamberini							20	16									0
	(United Kingdom) Jolyon Palmer							DNS	DNS									0
Pos	Driver	SIL (United Kingdom)		MAG (France)		SPA (Belgium)		NÜR (Germany)		BRH (United Kingdom)		RBR (Austria)		MNZ (Italy)		CAT (Spain)		Points

Colour	Result
Gold	Winner
Silver	Second place
Bronze	Third place
Green	Points classification
Blue	Non-points classification
Blue	Non-classified finish (NC)
Purple	Retired, not classified (Ret)
Red	Did not qualify (DNQ)
Red	Did not pre-qualify (DNPQ)
Black	Disqualified (DSQ)
White	Did not start (DNS)
White	Withdrew (WD)
White	Race cancelled (C)
Blank	Did not practice (DNP)
Blank	Did not arrive (DNA)
Blank	Excluded (EX)

**Bold** – Pole
Italics – Fastest Lap
† – Retired, but classified
