= Thiemo Storz =

German racing driver (born 1991)

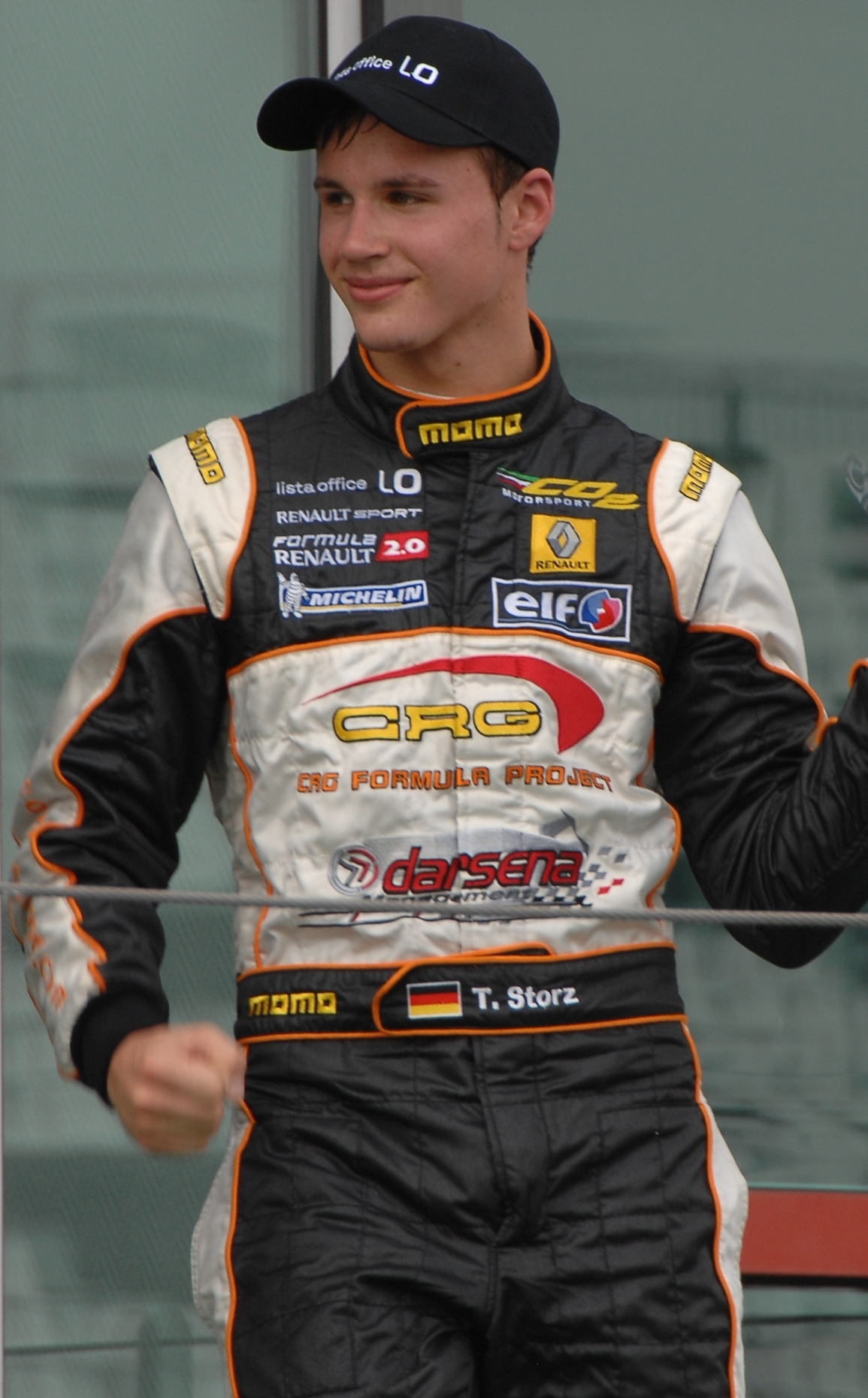
- Storz on the podium at Magny-Cours
- Nationality: (Germany) German
- Born: 12 October 1991 (age 35) Tettnang (Germany)

FIA Formula Two Championship career
- Debut season: 2011
- Current team: MotorSport Vision
- Car number: 21
- Starts: 6
- Wins: 0
- Poles: 0
- Fastest laps: 0
- Best finish: 12th in 2011

Previous series
- 2010 2009 2008-09: Formula Palmer Audi; LO Formula Renault 2.0 Suisse; Formula 2000 Light Italy

Championship titles
- 2009: F2000 Light Italy - Tatuus 2000

Thiemo Storz (born 12 October 1991 in Tettnang) is a racing driver from Germany.

== Career ==
=== Formula Renault 2.0 ===
After ten years in karting, Storz stepped up to single-seaters in 2008, making his debut in the Formula Renault 2.0 Italia Winter Cup. After finishing seventh in his first category, he also participated in Formula 2000 Light Italy Winter and main series, with fourth and fourteenth place respectively.

Storz remained in Formula 2000 Light Italy for 2009, also taking part in LO Formula Renault 2.0 Suisse and in Hungaroring round of the Formula Renault 2.0 Italia.

=== Formula Palmer Audi ===
Storz missed almost entire 2010 season due to academic reasons, but he appeared at Rockingham Motor Speedway, racing in Formula Palmer Audi.

=== FIA Formula Two Championship ===
After testing at the end of 2010 in Portimao and Barcelona, Storz made his FIA Formula Two Championship debut in 2011.

== Racing record ==
=== Career summary ===
Season	Series	Team	Races	Wins	Poles	F/Laps	Podiums	Points	Position
2008	Formula 2000 Light Italy	CO2 Motorsport	4	0	0	0	0	72	14th
2008	Formula 2000 Light Italy Winter Trophy	CO2 Motorsport	2	0	1	0	1	37	4th
2008	Formula Renault 2.0 Italia Winter Cup	CO2 Motorsport	2	0	0	0	0	24	7th
2009	Formula 2000 Light Italy	CO2 Motorsport	12	3	2	1	10	278	**2nd**
2009	LO Formula Renault 2.0 Suisse	CO2 Motorsport	12	0	0	0	4	176	**3rd**
2009	Formula 2000 Light Italy Opening Series	CO2 Motorsport	2	0	0	0	1	28	8th
2009	Formula Renault 2.0 Italia	CO2 Motorsport	2	0	0	1	1	20	24th
2010	Formula Palmer Audi	MotorSport Vision	2	0	0	0	0	20	23rd
2011	FIA Formula Two Championship	MotorSport Vision	6	0	0	0	0	19	12th

=== Complete FIA Formula Two Championship results ===
(key) (Races in bold indicate pole position) (Races in italics indicate fastest lap)

Year	1	2	3	4	5	6	7	8	9	10	11	12	13	14	15	16	Pos	Points
2011	SIL; 1; 14	SIL; 2; 14	MAG; 1; 9	MAG; 2; 15	SPA; 1; 6	SPA; 2; 10	NÜR; 1; 9	NÜR; 2; 15	BRH; 1 Ret	BRH; 2 Ret	RBR; 1 Ret	RBR; 2; 14	MON; 1; 7	MON; 2 Ret	CAT; 1; 11	CAT; 2; 16	12th	19
