= Oliver Oakes =

British racing driver and team manager (born 1988)

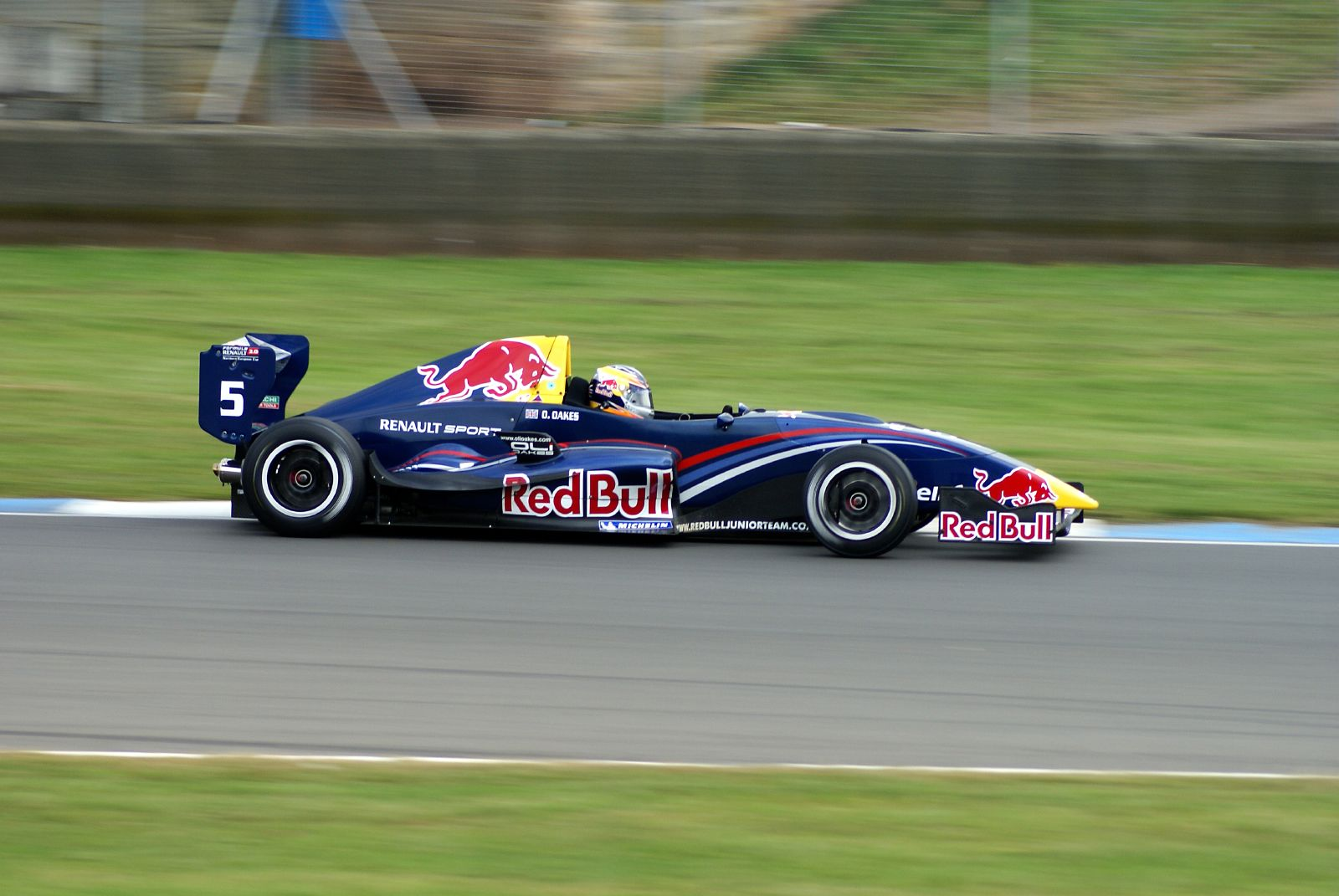
- Oakes driving in the Eurocup Formula Renault 2.0 in 2007.
- Nationality: (United Kingdom) British
- Born: Oliver James Kenneth Oakes; 11 January 1988 (age 38) Norfolk, England

GP3 Series
- Years active: 2010
- Teams: ATECH CRS GP
- Starts: 16
- Wins: 0
- Poles: 0
- Fastest laps: 0
- Best finish: 28th in 2010
- Finished last season: 28th

Previous series
- 2008–09 2008 2008 2006–07 2006–07 2006 2006 2005: British F3; Formula 3 Euro Series; International Formula Master; Eurocup Formula Renault 2.0; Formula Renault 2.0 NEC; Formula BMW UK; Formula BMW ADAC; FR2000 UK Winter Series

Oliver James Kenneth Oakes (born 11 January 1988) is a British motorsports executive and former racing driver. He was Team Principal for the Alpine F1 Team from July 2024 to May 2025 when he resigned from the role.

Oakes was the 2005 World Karting champion, and was once a part of the Red Bull Junior Team. Oakes moved into team management when he set up his first karting team in 2011 before launching junior single-seater racing team Hitech GP in 2015 which he was team principal and director of until he took over the Alpine F1 Team in 2024.

== Biography ==
=== Early life ===
Oliver James Kenneth Oakes was born 11 January 1988, the son of Billy Oakes, the founder and owner of the former Formula Renault and British F3 team Eurotek Motorsport. He was educated at King's Ely. He began karting at the age of four.

=== Racing career ===
Beginning his racing career in karting, Oakes was twice British Open Champion at the age of 12. His karting career ended after winning the Karting World Championship in 2005 at 17 years of age. His performances saw him attract the attention of the Red Bull Young Driver Programme.

Moving to car racing in 2006, Oakes debuted in Formula BMW with Carlin Motorsport, where he took pole and the victory in his first race. Further claiming 3 podiums and a string of strong results, he finished the season in 6th overall in the Formula BMW UK Championship. He was nominated for the McLaren Autosport BRDC Award.

In 2007, Oakes joined Motopark for the 2007 Formula Renault Eurocup season in which he finished 12th.

Oakes joined Eurotek Motorsport to compete in the British Formula 3 Championship in 2008, taking pole position at the final round at Donington.

Oakes moved to Carlin Motorsport for his 2009 campaign, but left after two rounds. He took up test-driver roles for the rest of 2009 and raced in the GP3 Series in 2010 for Atech CRS, finishing 28th in the championship.

=== Post-racing career ===
Since 2010, Oakes has been involved in various team roles whilst maintaining an ongoing affiliation with Tony Kart.

==== Team Oakes Racing ====
Team Oakes is a karting team and management service founded in 2011. Former drivers include Callum Ilott, Marcus Armstrong, Nikita Mazepin and Clement Novalak. Team Oakes have competed in WSK Championship Events, the German DKM Series and the CIK-FIA World and European Championships.

==== Hitech GP ====
Hitech GP was formed in early 2015 with David Hayle who previously formed Hitech Racing in 2003. Hitech currently competes in the FIA Formula 2, FIA Formula 3 and F3 Asian Championship Certified by FIA as well as managing the racing operations of W Series and the FIA Motorsport Games.

==== Alpine F1 Team ====
Oakes was announced as the Team Principal of Alpine F1 Team following the departure of Bruno Famin in August 2024. He would lead the team for the rest of the 2024 season and the start of the 2025 Formula One World Championship. He achieved his lone podium, and Team Enstone's first double podium since 2013, at the 2024 São Paulo Grand Prix. He resigned from his position in May 2025, days after his brother William, who was also a director for Hitech GP, was arrested for "transferring criminal property". Following the 2025 Miami Grand Prix, which was his last race as Alpine team principal, he flew to Dubai. Flavio Briatore would assume the role of de facto team principal in his place.

== Racing record ==
=== Career summary ===
Season	Series	Team	Races	Wins	Poles	F/Laps	Podiums	Points	Position
2005	Formula Renault 2.0 UK Winter Series	Team AKA	?	?	?	?	?	26	15th
2006	Formula BMW UK	Carlin Motorsport	18	1	2	?	4	148	6th
2006	Formula BMW ADAC	ADAC Berlin-Brandenburg	2	0	0	0	0	0	25th
2006	Formula Renault 2.0 Northern European Cup	Motopark Academy	2	0	0	0	0	26	27th
2006	Eurocup Formula Renault 2.0	Cram Competition	6	0	0	0	0	0†	NC†
2007	Formula Renault 2.0 Northern European Cup	Motopark Academy	14	0	0	0	5	191	4th
2007	Eurocup Formula Renault 2.0	Motopark Academy	14	0	0	1	0	32	12th
2008	British Formula 3 International Series	Eurotek Motorsport	10	0	1	0	0	1*	19th*
2008	International Formula Master	Euronova Racing	2	0	0	0	0	0	41st
2008	Formula 3 Euro Series	Carlin Motorsport	2	0	0	0	0	0†	NC†
2009	British Formula 3 International Series	Carlin Motorsport	4	0	0	0	0	7	18th
2010	GP3 Series	ATECH CRS GP	16	0	0	0	0	0	28th

† Oakes was a guest driver and ineligible for points.
* Oakes was an invited driver in rounds 9–11 and thus was only eligible for points in rounds 2 and 8.

=== Complete Eurocup Formula Renault 2.0 results ===
(key) (Races in bold indicate pole position; races in italics indicate fastest lap)

Year	Entrant	1	2	3	4	5	6	7	8	9	10	11	12	13	14	DC	Points
2006	Cram Competition	ZOL; 1	ZOL; 2	IST; 1	IST; 2	MIS; 1	MIS; 2	NÜR; 1	NÜR; 2	DON; 1 Ret	DON; 2 Ret	LMS; 1 Ret	LMS; 2; 8	CAT; 1; 19	CAT; 2; 8	NC†	0
2007	Motopark Academy	ZOL; 1; 7	ZOL; 2; 7	NÜR; 1; 6	NÜR; 2; 10	HUN; 1; 11	HUN; 2; 16	DON; 1; 11	DON; 2; 7	MAG; 1; 8	MAG; 2; 5	EST; 1; 14	EST; 2; 14	CAT; 1; 17	CAT; 2; 17	12th	32

† As Oakes was a guest driver, he was ineligible for points

=== Complete Formula Renault 2.0 NEC results ===
(key) (Races in bold indicate pole position) (Races in italics indicate fastest lap)

Year	Entrant	1	2	3	4	5	6	7	8	9	10	11	12	13	14	15	16	DC	Points
2007	Motopark Academy	ZAN; 1; 8	ZAN; 2; 5	OSC; 1 Ret	OSC; 2; 5	ASS; 1; 3	ASS; 2 Ret	ZOL; 1; 3	ZOL; 1; 3	NUR; 1; 3	NUR; 2; 3	OSC; 1; 6	OSC; 2; 4	SPA; 1; 4	SPA; 2; 5	HOC; 1	HOC; 2	4th	191

=== Complete GP3 Series results ===
(key) (Races in bold indicate pole position) (Races in italics indicate fastest lap)

Year	Entrant	1	2	3	4	5	6	7	8	9	10	11	12	13	14	15	16	DC	Points
2010	ATECH CRS GP	CAT; FEA; 14	CAT; SPR; 10	IST; FEA; 12	IST; SPR; Ret	VAL; FEA; Ret	VAL; SPR; 19	SIL; FEA; 13	SIL; SPR; 8	HOC; FEA; 13	HOC; SPR; 20^{†}	HUN; FEA; 16	HUN; SPR; 10	SPA; FEA; 17	SPA; SPR; 10	MNZ; FEA; 12	MNZ; SPR; 9	28th	0
