= Pablo Sánchez (racing driver) =

Mexican racing driver (born 1990)

- Nationality: (Mexico) Mexican
- Born: Pablo Sánchez López; February 9, 1990 (age 36) Mexico City (Mexico)
- Categorisation: FIA Gold

Pablo Sánchez López (born February 9, 1990, in Mexico City) is a Mexican racing driver. He competed in the 2009 Italian Formula Three season in which he finished third and won four races. This earned him a drive, along with the two drivers who finished ahead of him in the standings, in a Formula One Ferrari at the December 2009 young driver test at Jerez. López has also competed in such series as International Formula Master in which he finished third in 2007, taking two race victories.

== Racing record ==
=== Complete Eurocup Formula Renault 2.0 results ===
(key) (Races in bold indicate pole position; races in italics indicate fastest lap)

Year	Entrant	1	2	3	4	5	6	7	8	9	10	11	12	13	14	DC	Points
2006	BVM Motorsport	ZOL; 1; 25	ZOL; 2; 15	IST; 1; 24	IST; 2; 21	MIS; 1; 13	MIS; 2 Ret	NÜR; 1; 25	NÜR; 2; 21	DON; 1; 12	DON; 2; 19	LMS; 1; 19	LMS; 2 Ret	CAT; 1; 12	CAT; 2; 20	31st	0

=== Complete Formula Renault 3.5 Series results ===
(key) (Races in bold indicate pole position) (Races in italics indicate fastest lap)

Year	Entrant	1	2	3	4	5	6	7	8	9	10	11	12	13	14	15	16	17	DC	Points
2008	Interwetten.com	MNZ; 1; 4	MNZ; 2 Ret	SPA; 1; 8	SPA; 2 Ret	MON; 1; 21	SIL; 1; 21	SIL; 2; 24	HUN; 1; 8	HUN; 2 Ret	NÜR; 1; 6	NÜR; 2; 8	BUG; 1 Ret	BUG; 2; 17	EST; 1; 13	EST; 2; 21	CAT; 1; 12	CAT; 2 Ret	17th	18

=== Complete GP3 Series results ===
(key) (Races in bold indicate pole position) (Races in italics indicate fastest lap)

Year	Entrant	1	2	3	4	5	6	7	8	9	10	11	12	13	14	15	16	DC	Points
2010	Addax Team	CAT; FEA; Ret	CAT; SPR; 15	IST; FEA; 21	IST; SPR; 16	VAL; FEA; 14	VAL; SPR; 9	SIL; FEA; 21	SIL; SPR; 14	HOC; FEA; Ret	HOC; SPR; 11	HUN; FEA; Ret	HUN; SPR; 16	SPA; FEA; Ret	SPA; SPR; 25	MNZ; FEA; 18	MNZ; SPR; 12	**30th**	**0**
