= Tobias Hegewald =

German racing driver (born 1989)

- Nationality: (Germany) German
- Born: 3 August 1989 (age 37) Neuwied (Germany)

FIA Formula Two Championship
- Years active: 2009, 2011
- Car number: 18
- Starts: 32
- Wins: 2
- Poles: 3
- Fastest laps: 3
- Best finish: 6th in 2009, 2011

Previous series
- 2010 2009 2009 2008 2007–08 2007–08 2005–06 2005–06: GP3 Series; FIA Formula Two; Formula Renault 3.5 Series; FPA Autumn Trophy; Formula Renault Eurocup; Formula Renault 2.0 NEC; Formula BMW ADAC; Formula BMW USA

Tobias Hegewald (born 3 August 1989 in Neuwied) is a German former racing driver.

== Career ==
=== Karting ===
Hegewald spent three seasons racing in professional karting, including a fifth place in the 2002 Junior Monaco Kart Cup at ICA Junior level, racing against the likes of Formula Three Euroseries racers Alexander Sims, Jean Karl Vernay, Stefano Coletti and Jules Bianchi and also Sébastien Buemi.

=== Formula BMW ===
For 2005, Hegewald moved to open-wheel racing by taking part in both the Formula BMW ADAC series, and the Formula BMW USA series. He finished 20th in the German championship with six points, and finished 15th in the American series, with 22 points and two poles, including one at the 2005 Canadian Grand Prix-support race in Montréal.

2006 saw very little improvement for Hegewald, as he finished 13th in the ADAC series, amassing 29 points from 18 races. He again interloped into four rounds of the American series and scored 23 points en route to 14th in that particular championship.

=== Formula Renault ===
Hegewald signed for the Oschersleben-based Motorsport Arena team for a dual 2007 campaign in both the Formula Renault 2.0 Northern European Cup and in the Formula Renault Eurocup. Compared to a lacklustre Eurocup campaign, Hegewald battled Frank Kechele for the NEC title, and lost out by 79 points – yet Hegewald's three wins and ten podiums were plenty good enough for him to earn second place in the championship.

With the team renamed to Motopark Academy for 2008, Hegewald continued in the two championships, hoping for some title success. His results in the pan-European championship improved and he ended up a creditable fifth in the championship with two podiums, however he was outperformed on numerous occasions by team-mate Valtteri Bottas, who eventually went on to claim the Eurocup after a hard-fought title battle with Daniel Ricciardo, the highly consistent Andrea Caldarelli and Roberto Merhi. In the NEC, Hegewald won only one race out of 14, as he dropped down to third in the championship. Again, Bottas dominated the title race, and Hegewald was also beaten by António Félix da Costa, as Motopark locked out the top four positions in the championship – Johan Jokinen also finished fourth.

Hegewald competed in the second event of the 2009 Formula Renault 3.5 Series season, replacing Mihai Marinescu at the Interwetten team. The event took place before the start of the 2009 FIA Formula Two Championship season, to which he also committed.

=== FIA Formula Two Championship ===
Having competed over the offseason in Formula Palmer Audi, Hegewald signed up to drive in the relaunched FIA Formula Two Championship in 2009. He drove car No. 8 in the series, and finished sixth in the championship, including a dominating weekend at Spa, when he took both poles, both fastest laps and both wins. He returned to the championship in 2011 after his GP3 Series campaign.

=== GP3 Series ===
Hegewald moved to the new GP3 Series for its inaugural season in 2010. He joined Nigel Melker and Renger van der Zande at RSC Mücke Motorsport.

== Racing record ==
=== Career summary ===
Season	Series	Team	Races	Wins	Poles	F/Laps	Podiums	Points	Position
2005	Formula BMW ADAC	ADAC Berlin-Brandenburg e.V.	20	0	0	0	0	6	20th
2005	Formula BMW USA	Atlantic Racing Team	4	0	2	0	1	22	15th
2005	Formula BMW World Final	ASL Team Mücke Motorsport	1	0	0	0	0	N/A	24th
2006	Formula BMW ADAC	ADAC Mittelrhein e.V.	18	0	0	0	0	29	13th
2006	Formula BMW USA	Mosquito Motorsports	4	0	0	0	0	23	14th
2006	Formula BMW World Final	AIM Autosport	1	0	0	0	0	N/A	33
2007	Eurocup Formula Renault 2.0	Motorsport Arena	14	0	0	0	1	25	13th
2007	Formula Renault 2.0 NEC	Motorsport Arena	14	3	5	10	4	297	**2nd**
2008	Eurocup Formula Renault 2.0	Motopark Academy	14	0	0	0	2	71	5th
2008	Formula Renault 2.0 NEC	Motorsport Arena	14	1	1	1	10	260	**3rd**
2008	Formula Palmer Audi Autumn Trophy	MotorSport Vision	6	0	0	0	0	63	7th
2009	Formula Renault 3.5 Series	Interwetten.com	2	0	0	0	0	0	33rd
2009	FIA Formula Two Championship	MotorSport Vision	16	2	3	2	3	46	6th
2010	GP3 Series	RSC Mücke Motorsport	16	0	0	0	0	6	22nd
2010	Formula 3 Euro Series	Motopark Academy	2	0	0	0	0	1	16th
2011	FIA Formula Two Championship	MotorSport Vision	16	0	0	1	1	121	6th

=== Complete Eurocup Formula Renault 2.0 results ===
(key) (Races in bold indicate pole position; races in italics indicate fastest lap)

Year	Entrant	1	2	3	4	5	6	7	8	9	10	11	12	13	14	DC	Points
2007	Motorsport Arena	ZOL; 1; 9	ZOL; 2; 16	NÜR; 1; 8	NÜR; 2; 6	HUN; 1; 15	HUN; 2; 17	DON; 1; 15	DON; 2; 14	MAG; 1; 21	MAG; 2; 2	EST; 1; 22	EST; 2; 20	CAT; 1; 13	CAT; 2; 22	13th	25
2008	Motopark Academy	SPA; 1; 11	SPA; 2; 5	SIL; 1; 10	SIL; 2; 6	HUN; 1; 6	HUN; 2; 3	NÜR; 1; 4	NÜR; 2; 6	LMS; 1; 5	LMS; 2; 8	EST; 1; 6	EST; 2 Ret	CAT; 1; 2	CAT; 2; 5	5th	72

=== Complete Formula Renault 2.0 NEC results ===
(key) (Races in bold indicate pole position) (Races in italics indicate fastest lap)

Year	Entrant	1	2	3	4	5	6	7	8	9	10	11	12	13	14	15	16	DC	Points
2007	Motorsport Arena	ZAN; 1; 3	**ZAN**; **2**; 3	OSC; 1; 2	OSC; 2; 4	ASS; 1; 1	ASS; 2; 2	ZOL; 1; 2	ZOL; 1; 2	**NUR**; **1**; 1	**NUR**; **2**; 1	**OSC**; **1**; 5	OSC; 2; 7	SPA; 1 Ret	SPA; 2; 3	HOC; 1	HOC; 2	2nd	297
2008	Motopark Academy	HOC; 1; 2	HOC; 2; 19†	ZAN; 1; 9	ZAN; 2; 2	ALA; 1; 2	ALA; 2; 3	OSC; 1	OSC; 2	ASS; 1; 10	ASS; 2; 3	ZOL; 1; 3	ZOL; 2; 1	NÜR; 1; 3	NÜR; 2; 2	**SPA**; **1**; 2	SPA; 2; 16	3rd	260

=== Complete FIA Formula Two Championship results ===
(key) (Races in bold indicate pole position) (Races in italics indicate fastest lap)

Year	1	2	3	4	5	6	7	8	9	10	11	12	13	14	15	16	Pos	Points
2009	VAL; 1 Ret	VAL; 2; 9	BRN; 1; 15	BRN; 2; 7	**SPA**; **1**; 1	**SPA**; **2**; 1	BRH; 1; 15	BRH; 2; 6	**DON**; **1**; 3	DON; 2; 6	OSC; 1 Ret	OSC; 2; 6	IMO; 1 Ret	IMO; 2; 4	CAT; 1; 9	CAT; 2; 5	6th	46
2011	SIL; 1; 6	SIL; 2; 4	MAG; 1; 2	MAG; 2; 8	SPA; 1; 4	SPA; 2 Ret	NÜR; 1; 12	NÜR; 2; 4	BRH; 1; 3	BRH; 2; 5	RBR; 1; 15	RBR; 2; 6	MON; 1; 6	MON; 2; 9	CAT; 1; 4	CAT; 2; 11	6th	121

=== Complete GP3 Series results ===
(key) (Races in bold indicate pole position) (Races in italics indicate fastest lap)

Year	Entrant	1	2	3	4	5	6	7	8	9	10	11	12	13	14	15	16	DC	Points
2010	RSC Mücke Motorsport	CAT; FEA; 17	CAT; SPR; 13	IST; FEA; 16	IST; SPR; 15	VAL; FEA; 9	VAL; SPR; 29	SIL; FEA; 4	SIL; SPR; 6	HOC; FEA; Ret	HOC; SPR; Ret	HUN; FEA; 15	HUN; SPR; Ret	SPA; FEA; 11	SPA; SPR; 8	MNZ; FEA; 10	MNZ; SPR; 11	22nd	6
