= Ivan Lukashevich =

Russian racing driver (born 1991)

- Nationality: Russian
- Born: Ivan Andreyevich Lukashevich; 9 May 1991 (age 35) Moscow, Russian SFSR, Soviet Union
- Categorisation: FIA Silver

Previous series
- 2010-11 2011 2007–08 2006: GP3 Series; Toyota Racing Series; Formula Palmer Audi; Formula Ford 1800 Benelux

Ivan Andreyevich Lukashevich (Russian: Ива́н Андре́евич Лукаше́вич, IPA: [ɪˈvan ɐnˈdrʲejɪvʲɪtɕ lʊkɐˈʂevʲɪtɕ], born 9 May 1991) is a Russian racing driver. He was part of the Marussia Motors driver development programme.

== Career ==
=== Karting ===
Born in Moscow, Lukashevich competed in karting from 2001 to 2005. In 2001 and 2002, he took the Mini Class title of the Moscow Karting Championship. He also won the Russian Karting Cup in 2002.

=== Formula Palmer Audi ===
Lukashevich's next step was Formula Palmer Audi. He finished fifteenth in the championship, amassing 123 points. A second season followed in 2008, and was more successful for the Russian driver. Despite only taking part in half of the season's twenty races due to budget constraints, he secured a top ten championship finish.

Lukashevich missed the entire 2009 season due to sponsorship problems.

=== GP3 Series ===
Lukashevich stepped up to the new-for-2010 GP3 Series with Status Grand Prix.

== Racing record ==
=== Career summary ===
Season	Series	Team	Races	Wins	Poles	F/Laps	Podiums	Points	Position
2007	Formula Palmer Audi	Audi Russia Motorsport	15	0	0	0	0	123	15th
2008	Formula Palmer Audi	Audi Russia Motorsport	11	0	0	2	2	155	10th
2010	GP3 Series	Status Grand Prix	16	0	0	0	0	0	32nd
2010	Eurocup Formula Renault 2.0	Team Firstair	2	0	0	0	0	0	NC†
2011	GP3 Series	Status Grand Prix	16	0	0	0	0	0	26th
2011	Toyota Racing Series	M2 Competition	12	1	0	1	2	531	7th
2018	ADAC GT Masters	Phoenix Racing	12	0	0	0	0	8	35th
2018	Russian Circuit Racing Series - Touring	Lukoil Racing Team	14	1	1	1	4	174	4th
2019	GT4 European Series - Pro-Am	Bullitt Racing	4	0	0	0	0	0	NC
2019	Russian Circuit Racing Series - Touring	Lukoil Racing Team	14	1	1	1	5	176	4th
2020	Russian Circuit Racing Series - Touring	Lukoil Racing Team	14	2	3	1	4	155	6th
2021	Russian Circuit Racing Series - Touring	Lukoil Racing Team	14	0	0	2	4	164	7th
2025	Russian Circuit Racing Series - GT4	Motor Sharks	12	4	0	3	8	262	**2nd**
2026	Russian Circuit Racing Series - GT4	Motor Sharks							

^{†} As Lukashevich was a guest driver, he was ineligible for points.

=== Complete GP3 Series results ===
(key) (Races in bold indicate pole position) (Races in italics indicate fastest lap)

Year	Entrant	1	2	3	4	5	6	7	8	9	10	11	12	13	14	15	16	DC	Points
2010	Status Grand Prix	CAT; FEA; 19	CAT; SPR; 19	IST; FEA; 19	IST; SPR; 27	VAL; FEA; 16	VAL; SPR; 25	SIL; FEA; 19	SIL; SPR; Ret	HOC; FEA; 17	HOC; SPR; 13	HUN; FEA; 25	HUN; SPR; 18	SPA; FEA; Ret	SPA; SPR; 13	MNZ; FEA; 19	MNZ; SPR; 14	32nd	0
2011	Status Grand Prix	IST; FEA; 14	IST; SPR; 24	CAT; FEA; 17	CAT; SPR; 13	VAL; FEA; Ret	VAL; SPR; Ret	SIL; FEA; 18	SIL; SPR; 24	NÜR; FEA; 11	NÜR; SPR; 18	HUN; FEA; 28	HUN; SPR; 23	SPA; FEA; 10	SPA; SPR; 8	MNZ; FEA; Ret	MNZ; SPR; Ret	26th	0

=== Complete Eurocup Formula Renault 2.0 results ===
(key) (Races in bold indicate pole position; races in italics indicate fastest lap)

Year	Entrant	1	2	3	4	5	6	7	8	9	10	11	12	13	14	15	16	DC	Points
2010	Team Firstair	ALC; 1	ALC; 2	SPA; 1	SPA; 2	BRN; 1	BRN; 2	MAG; 1	MAG; 2	HUN; 1; 14	HUN; 2; 19	HOC; 1	HOC; 2	SIL; 1	SIL; 2	CAT; 1	CAT; 2	NC†	0

† As Lukashevich was a guest driver, he was ineligible for points
