= Miki Monrás =

Spanish racing driver

- Nationality: (Spain) Spanish
- Born: Miquel Monrás Albanell; 17 January 1992 (age 34) Barcelona (Spain)
- Current team: MotorSport Vision

FIA Formula Two Championship
- Years active: 2011
- Car number: 6
- Starts: 14
- Wins: 1
- Poles: 1
- Fastest laps: 2
- Best finish: 4th in 2011

Previous series
- 2010 2008–09 2008–09 2007 2007: GP3 Series; Eurocup Formula Renault 2.0; Formula Renault 2.0 WEC; FR 2.0 Italy Winter Series; Master Junior Formula

Miquel "Miki" Monrás Albanell (born 17 January 1992 in Barcelona) is a Spanish former professional racing driver.

== Career ==
=== Karting ===
Monrás began his motorsport career in karting back in 2002. In 2007, he was runner-up of the European KF2 Championship behind championship winner Will Stevens. He also made his debut in single-seaters in 2007, racing in Master Junior Formula.

=== Formula Renault ===
Monrás contested the Formula Renault 2.0 Italia Winter Series at the end of the 2007 season, where he was thirteenth. Monrás moved up to the Eurocup Formula Renault 2.0 and Formula Renault 2.0 West European Cup for the 2008 season, with the Hitech Junior Team. He finished 21st in the Eurocup standings, taking two points-scoring positions in fourteen races. In the West European Cup, he took eighth place in the championship, taking five points scoring positions in fifteen races, including a podium in the final race of the season at Valencia.

The following season, Monrás competed in both the Eurocup Formula Renault 2.0 and Formula Renault 2.0 West European Cup championships for SG Formula. He finished fifth in the Eurocup standings, taking eleven points-scoring positions in fourteen races, including podiums at Barcelona and two at Hungaroring. In the West European Cup, he took fourth place in the championship, scoring seven podium places.

=== GP3 Series ===
2010 saw Monrás move to the GP3 Series, competing for MW Arden, the team that is backed by Formula One Red Bull Racing's driver Mark Webber. He joined Michael Christensen at the team.

=== Formula Two ===
In 2011, Monrás moved again to the FIA Formula Two Championship. He achieved two podiums including one win at his first race weekend at Silverstone, taking pole position in the same race he won. He finished the championship in fourth.

Due to funding issues, Monrás was unable to compete in single-seaters in 2012 and sampled GT's in the Blancpain Endurance Series and tested with Audi Sport and Atech GP, but a full-time seat didn't materialise. Monrás transitioned into driver coaching and team management with the AV Formula team owned by his manager, Adrián Vallés – and left motorsport in 2017 and currently works in Real Estate.

== Racing record ==
=== Career summary ===
Season	Series	Team	Races	Wins	Poles	F/Laps	Podiums	Points	Position
2007	Master Junior Formula		3	0	0	0	0	25	17th
2007	Formula Renault 2.0 Italia Winter Series	Cram Competition	4	0	0	0	0	32	13th
2008	Formula Renault 2.0 WEC	Hitech Junior Team; SG Formula	15	0	0	0	1	30	8th
2008	Formula Renault 2.0 Eurocup	Hitech Junior Team; SG Formula	14	0	0	0	0	6	21st
2009	Formula Renault 2.0 Eurocup	Epsilon Euskadi	14	0	0	0	3	76	5th
2009	Formula Renault 2.0 WEC	Epsilon Euskadi	14	0	1	1	7	117	4th
2010	GP3 Series	MW Arden	16	0	0	1	2	17	10th
2011	FIA Formula Two Championship	MotorSport Vision	16	1	1	2	4	153	4th

=== Complete Eurocup Formula Renault 2.0 results ===
(key) (Races in bold indicate pole position; races in italics indicate fastest lap)

Year	Entrant	1	2	3	4	5	6	7	8	9	10	11	12	13	14	DC	Points
2008	Hitech Junior Team	SPA; 1; 19	SPA; 2; 11	SIL; 1; 30	SIL; 2; 24	HUN; 1; 12	HUN; 2; 22	NÜR; 1; 14	NÜR; 2 Ret	LMS; 1; 16	LMS; 2; 27					21st	6
2008	SG Formula											EST; 1; 7	EST; 2 Ret	CAT; 1; 9	CAT; 2 Ret	21st	6
2009	Epsilon Euskadi	CAT; 1; 5	CAT; 2; 3	SPA; 1 Ret	SPA; 2; 5	HUN; 1; 3	HUN; 2; 3	SIL; 1; 4	SIL; 2; 6	LMS; 1; 5	LMS; 2; 7	NÜR; 1 Ret	NÜR; 2; 4	ALC; 1; 12	ALC; 2; 9	5th	76

=== Complete GP3 Series results ===
(key) (Races in bold indicate pole position) (Races in italics indicate fastest lap)

Year	Entrant	1	2	3	4	5	6	7	8	9	10	11	12	13	14	15	16	DC	Points
2010	MW Arden	CAT; FEA; 10	CAT; SPR; 23	IST; FEA; 7	IST; SPR; 2	VAL; FEA; 5	VAL; SPR; 13	SIL; FEA; 15	SIL; SPR; 18	HOC; FEA; Ret	HOC; SPR; 15	HUN; FEA; Ret	HUN; SPR; 20	SPA; FEA; 9	SPA; SPR; 3	MNZ; FEA; 11	MNZ; SPR; 6	10th	17

=== Complete Formula Two results ===
(key) (Races in bold indicate pole position) (Races in italics indicate fastest lap)

Year	1	2	3	4	5	6	7	8	9	10	11	12	13	14	15	16	Pos	Points
2011	SIL; 1; 3	**SIL**; **2**; 1	MAG; 1; 4	MAG; 2; 4	SPA; 1; 9	SPA; 2; 4	NÜR; 1; 4	NÜR; 2; 7	BRH; 1; 4	BRH; 2; 9	RBR; 1 Ret	RBR; 2; 11	MON; 1; 17	MON; 2; 3	CAT; 1; 2	CAT; 2; 4	4th	153
