= Dean Smith (racing driver) =

British racing driver (born 1988)

- Nationality: (United Kingdom) British
- Born: 22 March 1988 (age 38) Wolverhampton, England
- Categorisation: FIA Gold

Previous series
- 2010–11 2008–09 2008–09 2008 2008 2007 2006–07, 2009 2004–05: GP3 Series; Porsche Carrera Cup GB; Eurocup Formula Renault 2.0; Formula Renault 2.0 WEC; British Formula 3 Formula Renault 2.0 NEC; Formula Renault UK; Formula BMW UK

Championship titles
- 2009 2005: Formula Renault UK; Formula BMW UK

Awards
- 2009: McLaren Autosport Award

Dean Smith (born 22 March 1988 in Wolverhampton, West Midlands) is a British former racing driver, who was the 2009 champion of the British Formula Renault Championship and winner of that year's McLaren Autosport BRDC Award.

== Career ==
=== Formula BMW ===
After previously competing in karting, Smith was awarded a Formula BMW scholarship in 2004, finishing 15th in the Formula BMW UK championship. He took three wins on his way to winning the championship in 2005.

=== Formula Renault ===
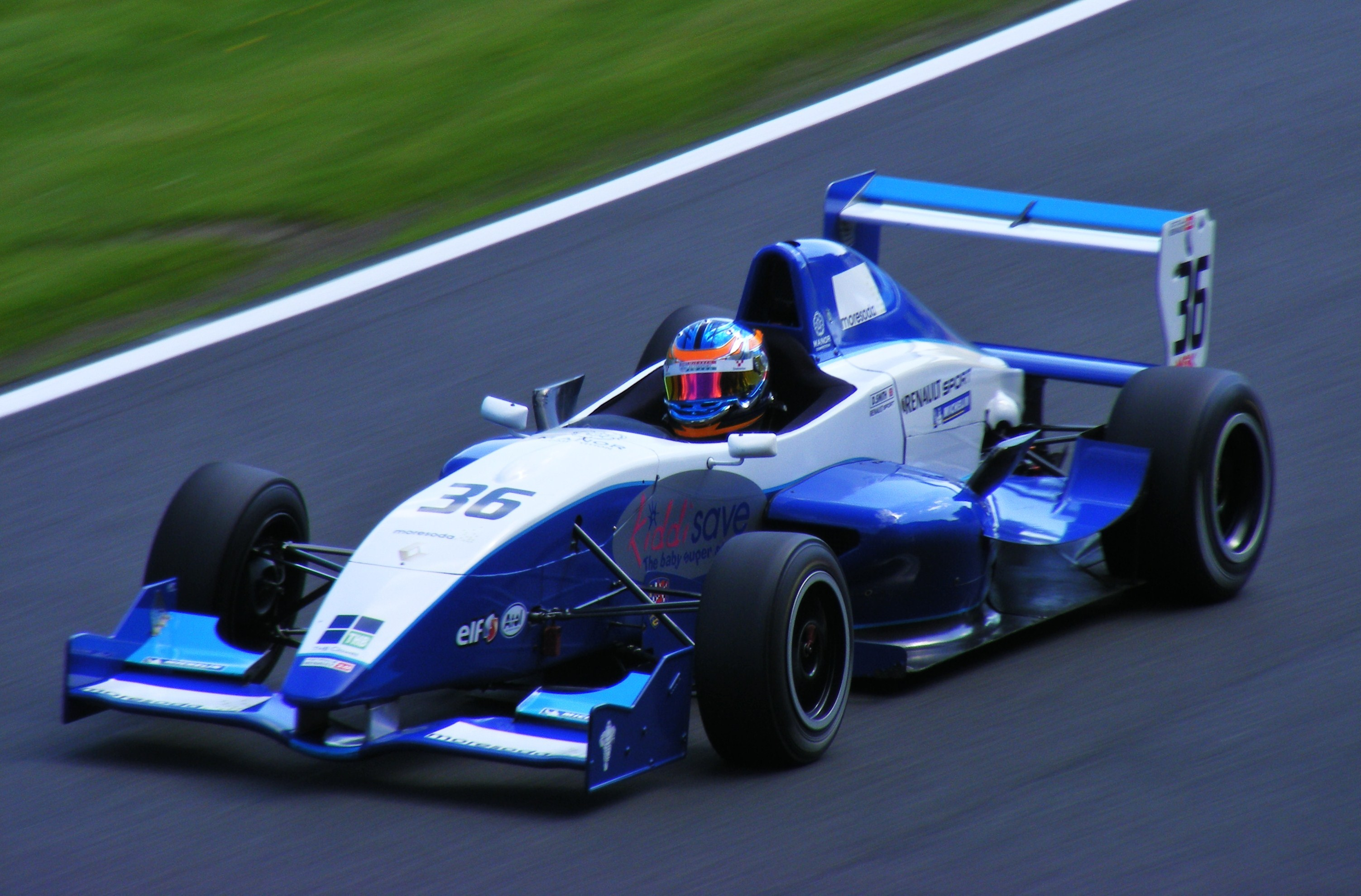
Smith competing during the 2009 Formula Renault UK season at Oulton Park.

Smith moved up to the British Formula Renault Championship in 2006, finishing ninth in the overall standings. In 2007, he finished as runner-up to Fortec Motorsport teammate Duncan Tappy. He made the move to the Eurocup Formula Renault 2.0 in 2008 for Fortec, but finished down in 17th place. Smith finished the year by scoring two fourth-placed finishes on his British Formula 3 debut with Fortec. A lack of funds prevented him from a full F3 campaign in 2009, meaning he moved to the Porsche Carrera Cup. He was then given the opportunity to join British Formula Renault team Manor Competition, and took seven victories on his way to winning the title, despite missing the opening round of the championship at Brands Hatch due to him competing in the supporting Porsche races at the circuit. He also took second place in the final race of the Eurocup season at the brand-new Ciudad del Motor de Aragón circuit in Spain.

In December 2009, Smith was awarded the prestigious McLaren Autosport BRDC Award. As part of the prize, he tested a McLaren Formula One car.

=== GP3 Series ===
Smith raced in the new GP3 Series in 2010 with Carlin, after securing support from the Racing Steps Foundation.

== Racing record ==
=== Complete Formula Renault 2.0 NEC results ===
(key) (Races in bold indicate pole position) (Races in italics indicate fastest lap)

Year	Entrant	1	2	3	4	5	6	7	8	9	10	11	12	13	14	15	16	DC	Points
2007	Fortec Motorsport	ZAN; 1	ZAN; 2	OSC; 1 DSQ	OSC; 2; 16	ASS; 1	ASS; 2	ZOL; 1	ZOL; 1	NUR; 1	NUR; 2	OSC; 1	OSC; 2	SPA; 1	SPA; 2	HOC; 1	HOC; 2	43rd	5

=== Complete Eurocup Formula Renault 2.0 results ===
(key) (Races in bold indicate pole position; races in italics indicate fastest lap)

Year	Entrant	1	2	3	4	5	6	7	8	9	10	11	12	13	14	DC	Points
2008	Fortec Motorsports	SPA; 1; 12	SPA; 2 Ret	SIL; 1; 18	SIL; 2; 16	HUN; 1; 29	HUN; 2 Ret	NÜR; 1; 7	NÜR; 2; 12	LMS; 1 Ret	LMS; 2; 10	EST; 1; 10	EST; 2; 6	CAT; 1; 17	CAT; 2 Ret	17th	11
2009	BVM Minardi	CAT; 1	CAT; 2	SPA; 1	SPA; 2	HUN; 1	HUN; 2	SIL; 1	SIL; 2	LMS; 1	LMS; 2	NÜR; 1	NÜR; 2	ALC; 1; 7	ALC; 2; 2	NC†	0

† As Smith was a guest driver, he was ineligible for points

=== Complete GP3 Series results ===
(key) (Races in bold indicate pole position) (Races in italics indicate fastest lap)

Year	Entrant	1	2	3	4	5	6	7	8	9	10	11	12	13	14	15	16	DC	Points
2010	Carlin	CAT; FEA; 4	CAT; SPR; 5	IST; FEA; 22	IST; SPR; 10	VAL; FEA; 17	VAL; SPR; 23	SIL; FEA; 6	SIL; SPR; 22	HOC; FEA; 9	HOC; SPR; 12	HUN; FEA; 5	HUN; SPR; 3	SPA; FEA; 6	SPA; SPR; 4	MNZ; FEA; Ret	MNZ; SPR; 16	7th	24
2011	Addax Team	IST; FEA; 9	IST; SPR; 6	CAT; FEA; 7	CAT; SPR; 3	VAL; FEA; 5	VAL; SPR; 11	SIL; FEA; 8	SIL; SPR; 2	NÜR; FEA; 24	NÜR; SPR; Ret	HUN; FEA; 24	HUN; SPR; 19	SPA; FEA; 20	SPA; SPR; 20	MNZ; FEA	MNZ; SPR	12th	18

Awards
Preceded by Alexander Sims	McLaren Autosport BRDC Award; 2009	Succeeded by Lewis Williamson
Sporting positions
Preceded by Tim Bridgman	Formula BMW UK; Champion; 2005	Succeeded by Niall Breen
Preceded by Adam Christodoulou	Formula Renault UK; Champion; 2009	Succeeded by Tom Blomqvist
