= 2009 Formula Palmer Audi season =

2009 Formula Palmer Audi

Seasons
- ← 2008 2010 →

The 2009 Formula Palmer Audi season was the twelfth Formula Palmer Audi season. It began on May 2 at Brands Hatch and finished on October 18 at Snetterton. It consisted of twenty rounds all held in England. The championship was won by Richard Plant in his third FPA season.

In a new incentive for 2009, the winner of this season's championship received a £50,000 scholarship prize towards a Formula Two drive, and the top three all received a F2 test.

== Driver lineup ==
Car #	Driver	Sponsor(s)	Rounds
2	(United Kingdom) Richard Plant	G W Price	All
3	(United Kingdom) Paul Rees	Oxford Audi	All
4	(United Kingdom) Ashley Babbra	AMB Racing & Events Ltd.	All
5	(France) Maxime Jousse	E. Leclerc	All
6	(United Kingdom) Kenny Andrews	Quattro Plant Ltd.	1–4
6	(Germany) Bastian Graber	ALWA - Montagen	6–7
7	(United Kingdom) Adam Foster	Platinum Computer Solutions	All
8	(United Kingdom) Mark Powell	Future World	4
8	(Greece) Dimitris Papanastasiou	Amalthia Shipping Co. Inc	5–7
9	(Spain) José Alonso Liste	KENTES / Time Force	1–6
10	(Italy) Luca Orlandi	Constellar	All
11	(United Kingdom) Mark Powell	Corsport	1
11	(United Kingdom) Dominic Pettit	Dominant Motorsport	2
11	(Brazil) Andre Manzarra	Floripa Prime	3, 5
11	(United Kingdom) Jolyon Palmer	Comma Oil	6–7
12	(Switzerland) Philipp Frommenwiler	Schober Information Group	1–6
12	(Brazil) Danilo Estrela	Schober Information Group	7
13	(Spain) María de Villota	Hola Magazine	1–3
14	(France) Julien Gerbi	Biotech International / myracedriver.com	All
15	(Italy) Giuseppe Cipriani	tedeschiusa.com	All
16	(United Kingdom) Tom Duggan	Stars of Tomorrow	1–2
16	(United Kingdom) Alice Powell	www.silverstone-hotels.com	5
16	(Spain) Ramón Piñeiro	Caja Madrid	6–7
18	(Finland) Emma Kimiläinen	Astrum Vene	All
19	(Slovenia) David Rotar	Racing Pool AMF	All
21	(Lithuania) Kazim Vasiliauskas	Darsena Management	All
22	(United Kingdom) Howard Fuller	AGM Transitions	All
33	(United States) Josef Newgarden	Robo Pong	1
33	(United Kingdom) Jolyon Palmer	Comtact	2
33	(Sweden) Felix Rosenqvist	Pintos	7
38	(France) Tristan Vautier	Mediaco	All
55	(Brazil) Thiago Calvet	Alfaparf Milano	1–3
55	(United Kingdom) Bruce Hodges	Metrow Foods	5–6
55	(Russia) Max Snegirev	Klaxon Automotive Magazine	7
66	(United Kingdom) Ash Davies	H2O Networks	All

== Race calendar and results ==
- All races held in the United Kingdom.

Round		Circuit	Date	Pole position	Fastest lap	Winning driver
1	R1	Brands Hatch GP	2 May	(United Kingdom) Adam Foster	(Lithuania) Kazim Vasiliauskas	(United States) Josef Newgarden
1	R2	Brands Hatch GP	2 May	(Lithuania) Kazim Vasiliauskas	(United Kingdom) Richard Plant	(United States) Josef Newgarden
1	R3	Brands Hatch GP	3 May	(Lithuania) Kazim Vasiliauskas	(United Kingdom) Richard Plant	(Lithuania) Kazim Vasiliauskas
2	R1	Silverstone National	7 June	(France) Tristan Vautier	(France) Tristan Vautier	(France) Tristan Vautier
2	R2	Silverstone National	7 June	(Spain) José Alonso Liste	(Finland) Emma Kimiläinen	(Spain) José Alonso Liste
2	R3	Silverstone National	7 June	(France) Tristan Vautier	(United Kingdom) Richard Plant	(United Kingdom) Richard Plant
3	R1	Snetterton Motor Racing Circuit	4 July	(United Kingdom) Richard Plant	(France) Maxime Jousse	(France) Tristan Vautier
3	R2	Snetterton Motor Racing Circuit	5 July	(United Kingdom) Richard Plant	(France) Tristan Vautier	(France) Tristan Vautier
4	R1	Oulton Park	25 July	(France) Tristan Vautier	(France) Tristan Vautier	(France) Tristan Vautier
4	R2	Oulton Park	25 July	(France) Tristan Vautier	(France) Tristan Vautier	(France) Tristan Vautier
4	R3	Oulton Park	25 July	(France) Tristan Vautier	(United Kingdom) Richard Plant	(United Kingdom) Richard Plant
5	R1	Brands Hatch Indy	22 August	(United Kingdom) Richard Plant	(United Kingdom) Richard Plant	(United Kingdom) Richard Plant
5	R2	Brands Hatch Indy	23 August	(United Kingdom) Richard Plant	(United Kingdom) Richard Plant	(United Kingdom) Richard Plant
5	R3	Brands Hatch Indy	23 August	(United Kingdom) Richard Plant	(United Kingdom) Adam Foster	(United Kingdom) Richard Plant
6	R1	Silverstone GP	2 October	(United Kingdom) Jolyon Palmer	(France) Tristan Vautier	(United Kingdom) Jolyon Palmer
6	R2	Silverstone GP	3 October	(United Kingdom) Jolyon Palmer	(United Kingdom) Jolyon Palmer	(France) Tristan Vautier
6	R3	Silverstone GP	3 October	(United Kingdom) Jolyon Palmer	(United Kingdom) Jolyon Palmer	(France) Maxime Jousse
7	R1	Snetterton Motor Racing Circuit	17 October	(United Kingdom) Paul Rees	(France) Tristan Vautier	(Lithuania) Kazim Vasiliauskas
7	R2	Snetterton Motor Racing Circuit	18 October	(Lithuania) Kazim Vasiliauskas	(Sweden) Felix Rosenqvist	(Sweden) Felix Rosenqvist
7	R3	Snetterton Motor Racing Circuit	18 October	(Sweden) Felix Rosenqvist	(Sweden) Felix Rosenqvist	(Sweden) Felix Rosenqvist

== Championship standings ==
Pos	Driver	BRH			SIL			SNE		OUL			BRH			SIL			SNE			Points
1	(United Kingdom) Richard Plant	3	5	2	5	Ret	1	**2**	**12**	3	3	1	**1**	**1**	**1**	10	9	7	2	8	8	330
2	(Lithuania) Kazim Vasiliauskas	4	**2**	**1**	3	4	Ret	9	2	2	2	2	4	4	6	3	2	Ret	1	**2**	Ret	313
3	(United Kingdom) Adam Foster	**2**	21	3	2	10	11	3	4	4	4	3	2	2	4	4	6	5	7	11	2	304
4	(France) Tristan Vautier	6	4	5	**1**	3	**2**	1	1	**1**	**1**	**5**	Ret	8	Ret	2	1	10	14	7	Ret	303
5	(Finland) Emma Kimiläinen	10	12	12	7	2	3	5	5	8	Ret	6	5	9	3	Ret	5	2	4	4	4	260
6	(United Kingdom) Ashley Babbra	19	8	9	8	7	6	10	8	Ret	5	4	6	7	Ret	7	8	4	5	6	6	227
7	(United Kingdom) Paul Rees	5	3	7	6	9	Ret	6	7	Ret	Ret	7	3	3	2	9	10	3	**Ret**	9	Ret	217
8	(France) Maxime Jousse	Ret	6	Ret	4	5	4	4	3	DNS	Ret	DNS	Ret	6	9	11	3	1	3	Ret	5	204
9	(Slovenia) David Rotar	11	10	Ret	11	6	5	8	11	6	Ret	DNS	7	13	8	6	4	6	8	Ret	7	193
10	(United Kingdom) Ash Davies	9	16	11	Ret	Ret	10	12	14	5	6	8	8	10	5	15	13	11	10	10	Ret	167
11	(Spain) José Alonso Liste	Ret	7	8	9	**1**	Ret	7	9	DNS	8	9	Ret	5	Ret	5	12	9				156
12	(France) Julien Gerbi	14	15	13	12	8	9	11	13	12	12	10	13	14	10	16	14	13	9	Ret	10	152
13	(Switzerland) Philipp Frommenwiler	8	11	10	Ret	11	8	13	10	7	7	11	10	12	Ret	8	11	14				149
14	(Italy) Giuseppe Cipriani	Ret	20	19	Ret	15	14	14	16	9	9	Ret	12	15	Ret	14	17	15	16	12	11	92
15	(United Kingdom) Howard Fuller	13	18	17	17	16	DNS	15	18	10	11	Ret	11	Ret	Ret	13	Ret	17	12	16	9	87
16	(United Kingdom) Jolyon Palmer				10	Ret	DNS									**1**	**18**	**18**	6	3	Ret	70
17	(Italy) Luca Orlandi	16	22	20	19	18	15	18	20	11	13	13	15	18	12	20	16	Ret	18	17	13	68
18	(United States) Josef Newgarden	1	1	4																		64
19	(United Kingdom) Kenny Andrews	7	9	6	14	17	DNS	Ret	6	DNS	DNS	DNS										61
20	(Spain) Ramón Piñeiro															17	7	Ret	13	5	3	56
21	(Sweden) Felix Rosenqvist																		Ret	1	**1**	48
22	(Spain) Maria de Villota	18	13	16	15	12	7	16	17													46
23	(Brazil) Thiago Calvet	12	14	15	18	13	13	17	15													43
24	(Germany) Bastian Graber															12	Ret	8	11	13	Ret	36
25	(United Kingdom) Alice Powell												9	11	7							33
26	(Greece) Dimitris Papanastasiou												Ret	Ret	11	18	15	12	17	15	Ret	32
27	(United Kingdom) Tom Duggan	17	17	14	16	14	12															30
28	(United Kingdom) Mark Powell	15	19	18						Ret	10	12										26
29	(United Kingdom) Bruce Hodges												16	16	13	19	Ret	16				20
30	(Brazil) Danilo Estrela																		Ret	14	12	14
31	(Brazil) Andre Manzarra							Ret	19				14	17	Ret							10
32	(United Kingdom) Dominic Pettit				13	Ret	DNS															7
33	(Russia) Max Snegirev																		15	DNS	DNS	5
Pos	Driver	BRH			SIL			SNE		OUL			BRH			SIL			SNE			Points

Colour	Result
Gold	Winner
Silver	Second place
Bronze	Third place
Green	Points classification
Blue	Non-points classification
Blue	Non-classified finish (NC)
Purple	Retired, not classified (Ret)
Red	Did not qualify (DNQ)
Red	Did not pre-qualify (DNPQ)
Black	Disqualified (DSQ)
White	Did not start (DNS)
White	Withdrew (WD)
White	Race cancelled (C)
Blank	Did not practice (DNP)
Blank	Did not arrive (DNA)
Blank	Excluded (EX)

**Bold** – Pole
Italics – Fastest lap
