= 2012 Auto GP World Series =

Seasons
- ← 2011 2013 →

The 2012 Auto GP World Series was the third year of the Auto GP series, and the fourteenth season of the former Euroseries 3000. The championship began on 11 March at Monza in Italy and finished on 23 September at Sonoma in the United States, after seven double-header rounds.

Each meeting's sprint race now lasts for a longer duration – a minimum of 90 km (55.9 mi), up from 70 km (43.5 mi) – while also introducing a mandatory pit-stop to the race. The series also introduced an overboost system that has already been used in the FIA Formula Two Championship. The points system for the second race was also amended.

Adrian Quaife-Hobbs won the opening race of the season at Monza after qualifying on pole position by 0.04 seconds. Pål Varhaug finished in second place and returnee Daniël de Jong attained his maiden podium in third. The reverse-grid second race was won by Varhaug, who left the meeting tied for the championship lead with Quaife-Hobbs. Three weeks later at Valencia, Quaife-Hobbs claimed pole again, but was unable to convert pole into another win, losing to Sergey Sirotkin, who became the youngest Auto GP winner, while Varhaug completed the podium. Quaife-Hobbs and Sirotkin continued their battle into the sprint race until an error during Sirotkin's pit-stop ended the battle early. Sirotkin recovered to finish the race in third place behind Quaife-Hobbs – who extended his championship lead with the race win – and Facu Regalia, who scored his first podium.

Two weeks later, the series' first non-European round was held in Morocco, where Sirotkin claimed his first pole position. He made a poor getaway, after being distracted by a marshal at the start. he lost many positions with Varhaug taking the lead. Varhaug was chased by Italian Formula Three champion Sergio Campana, leading until the pit-stop phase. Varhaug stalled in pit lane, losing positions to both Campana and Quaife-Hobbs, with Campana eventually taking his first series win, and the first for Team MLR71, after a close battle with Quaife-Hobbs. Sirotkin took the lead at the start of the second race, but lost time after his pit-stop, allowing Manor MP Motorsport's Chris van der Drift through to take his first win in the series ahead of Sirotkin. Varhaug, Quaife-Hobbs and Giacomo Ricci battled over the final podium position with Varhaug taking the position on-the-road before receiving a 25-second time penalty post-race for cutting a chicane. Ricci was promoted into third place ahead of Quaife-Hobbs, while Varhaug dropped to seventh and lost ground in the championship, falling behind Sirotkin, who moved into second.

All teams competed with the Lola B05/52-Zytek chassis/engine combination, with Kumho tires.

== Teams and drivers ==
Team	No.	Driver	Rounds
(Spain) Campos Racing	1	(Argentina) Facu Regalia	1–5
(Spain) Campos Racing	1	(United Kingdom) Pippa Mann	7
(Spain) Campos Racing	2	(Italy) Giuseppe Cipriani	All
(Spain) Campos Racing	3	(Russia) Max Snegirev	All
(Italy) Team MLR71	5	(Italy) Sergio Campana	1–5
(Italy) Team MLR71	5	(Italy) Giacomo Ricci	7
(Italy) Team MLR71	71	(Italy) Michele La Rosa	All
(United Kingdom) Virtuosi UK	6	(Italy) Matteo Beretta	1
(United Kingdom) Virtuosi UK	6	(Estonia) Sten Pentus	2
(United Kingdom) Virtuosi UK	6	(Italy) Francesco Dracone	3–7
(United Kingdom) Virtuosi UK	7	(Norway) Pål Varhaug	All
(Austria) Zele Racing	8	(Italy) Giacomo Ricci	1, 3
(Austria) Zele Racing	8	(Italy) Matteo Beretta	2
(Austria) Zele Racing	8	(Estonia) Sten Pentus	4–5
(Austria) Zele Racing	8	(Italy) Sergio Campana	7
(Austria) Zele Racing	9	(Austria) Peter Milavec	2
(Austria) Zele Racing	9	(Mexico) Juan Carlos Sistos	5
(Austria) Zele Racing	9	(Brazil) Antônio Pizzonia	7
(United Kingdom) Super Nova International	10	(United Kingdom) Adrian Quaife-Hobbs	All
(United Kingdom) Super Nova International	11	(Brazil) Victor Guerin	1–5
(Italy) Euronova Racing	12	(Russia) Sergey Sirotkin	All
(Italy) Euronova Racing	14	(Italy) Antonio Spavone	1–5
(Italy) Euronova Racing	14	(Italy) Sergio Campana	6
(Italy) Euronova Racing	14	(Japan) Kotaro Sakurai	7
(Italy) Ombra Racing	23	(China) Adderly Fong	1, 4
(Italy) Ombra Racing	23	(Brazil) Yann Cunha	2–3
(Italy) Ombra Racing	23	(Brazil) Antônio Pizzonia	6
(Italy) Ombra Racing	23	(Italy) Antonio Spavone	7
(Italy) Ombra Racing	45	(Venezuela) Giancarlo Serenelli	1–5, 7
(Italy) Ombra Racing	45	(Brazil) Rafael Suzuki	6
(Netherlands) Manor MP Motorsport	32	(Netherlands) Daniël de Jong	All
(Netherlands) Manor MP Motorsport	33	(New Zealand) Chris van der Drift	1–6

== Race calendar and results ==
A seven-round calendar was published on 23 December 2011, with all rounds supporting World Touring Car Championship events. On 9 March 2012, it was announced that the Portuguese round moved from Estoril to Portimão.

Round		Circuit/Location	Date	Pole position	Fastest lap	Winning driver	Winning team	Supporting
1	R1	(Italy) Monza Circuit	10 March	(United Kingdom) Adrian Quaife-Hobbs	(Russia) Sergey Sirotkin	(United Kingdom) Adrian Quaife-Hobbs	(United Kingdom) Super Nova International	FIA WTCC Race of Italy
1	R2	(Italy) Monza Circuit	11 March		(Russia) Sergey Sirotkin	(Norway) Pål Varhaug	(United Kingdom) Virtuosi UK	FIA WTCC Race of Italy
2	R1	(Spain) Circuit Ricardo Tormo, Cheste	31 March	(United Kingdom) Adrian Quaife-Hobbs	(Russia) Sergey Sirotkin	(Russia) Sergey Sirotkin	(Italy) Euronova Racing	FIA WTCC Race of Spain
2	R2	(Spain) Circuit Ricardo Tormo, Cheste	1 April		(Russia) Sergey Sirotkin	(United Kingdom) Adrian Quaife-Hobbs	(United Kingdom) Super Nova International	FIA WTCC Race of Spain
3	R1	(Morocco) Marrakech Street Circuit	14 April	(Russia) Sergey Sirotkin	(Italy) Sergio Campana	(Italy) Sergio Campana	(Italy) Team MLR71	FIA WTCC Race of Morocco
3	R2	(Morocco) Marrakech Street Circuit	15 April		(Russia) Sergey Sirotkin	(New Zealand) Chris van der Drift	(Netherlands) Manor MP Motorsport	FIA WTCC Race of Morocco
4	R1	(Hungary) Hungaroring	5 May	(United Kingdom) Adrian Quaife-Hobbs	(United Kingdom) Adrian Quaife-Hobbs	(United Kingdom) Adrian Quaife-Hobbs	(United Kingdom) Super Nova International	FIA WTCC Race of Hungary
4	R2	(Hungary) Hungaroring	6 May		(United Kingdom) Adrian Quaife-Hobbs	(Norway) Pål Varhaug	(United Kingdom) Virtuosi UK	FIA WTCC Race of Hungary
5	R1	(Portugal) Autódromo Internacional do Algarve	2 June	(United Kingdom) Adrian Quaife-Hobbs	(United Kingdom) Adrian Quaife-Hobbs	(United Kingdom) Adrian Quaife-Hobbs	(United Kingdom) Super Nova International	FIA WTCC Race of Portugal
5	R2	(Portugal) Autódromo Internacional do Algarve	3 June		(United Kingdom) Adrian Quaife-Hobbs	(United Kingdom) Adrian Quaife-Hobbs	(United Kingdom) Super Nova International	FIA WTCC Race of Portugal
6	R1	(Brazil) Autódromo Internacional de Curitiba	21 July	(United Kingdom) Adrian Quaife-Hobbs	(Netherlands) Daniël de Jong	(Brazil) Antônio Pizzonia	(Italy) Ombra Racing	FIA WTCC Race of Brazil
6	R2	(Brazil) Autódromo Internacional de Curitiba	22 July		(Norway) Pål Varhaug	(Brazil) Antônio Pizzonia	(Italy) Ombra Racing	FIA WTCC Race of Brazil
7	R1	(United States) Sonoma Raceway	22 September	(United Kingdom) Adrian Quaife-Hobbs	(Netherlands) Daniël de Jong	(Norway) Pål Varhaug	(United Kingdom) Virtuosi UK	FIA WTCC Race of the United States
7	R2	(United States) Sonoma Raceway	23 September		(Netherlands) Daniël de Jong	(Russia) Sergey Sirotkin	(Italy) Euronova Racing	FIA WTCC Race of the United States

== Championship standings ==
- Points for both championships were awarded as follows:

Race
Position	1st	2nd	3rd	4th	5th	6th	7th	8th	9th	10th
**Race One**	25	18	15	12	10	8	6	4	2	1
**Race Two**	20	15	12	10	8	6	4	3	2	1

In addition:

- One point will be awarded for Pole position for Race One.
- One point will be awarded for fastest lap in each race.

=== Drivers' Championship ===
Pos	Driver	MNZ (Italy)		VAL (Spain)		MAR (Morocco)		HUN (Hungary)		ALG (Portugal)		CUR (Brazil)		SON (United States)		Points
1	(United Kingdom) Adrian Quaife-Hobbs	**1**	3	**2**	1	2	4	**1**	2	**1**	1	**6**	12†	**Ret**	2	221
2	(Norway) Pål Varhaug	2	1	3	8	3	7	5	1	2	Ret	2	5	1	5	183
3	(Russia) Sergey Sirotkin	14	4	1	3	**6**	2	13†	3	3	3	3	4	3	1	175
4	(New Zealand) Chris van der Drift	5	2	6	7	4	1	7	5	8	2	5	2			127
5	(Netherlands) Daniël de Jong	3	Ret	4	4	7	Ret	11	12	7	7	4	3	2	6	104
6	(Italy) Sergio Campana	10	13	5	9	1	13	Ret	7	5	4	11†	8	4	3	90
7	(Argentina) Facu Regalia	4	9	7	2	Ret	10	3	10	6	5					68
8	(Brazil) Victor Guerin	15	11	16†	5	Ret	5	2	Ret	4	Ret					46
9	(Brazil) Antônio Pizzonia											1	1	Ret	12†	45
10	(Italy) Antonio Spavone	8	5	9	11	8	Ret	8	8	11	9			8	4	41
11	(Italy) Giacomo Ricci	6	14			5	3							5	11†	40
12	(Venezuela) Giancarlo Serenelli	9	8	11	12	11	11	4	9	10	6			6	Ret	34
13	(Russia) Max Snegirev	7	6	8	6	13	Ret	Ret	11	12	8	10†	7	Ret	7	34
14	(Italy) Giuseppe Cipriani	11	10	12	14	Ret	9	6	6	Ret	Ret	Ret	10	Ret	Ret	18
15	(Estonia) Sten Pentus			10	10			9	4	14†	Ret					14
16	(Italy) Francesco Dracone					10	8	10	14	13	10	8	9	Ret	9	14
17	(Brazil) Rafael Suzuki											7	6			12
18	(Brazil) Yann Cunha			13	Ret	9	6									8
19	(Japan) Kotaro Sakurai													7	Ret	6
20	(United Kingdom) Pippa Mann													9	8	5
21	(China) Adderly Fong	13	7					Ret	13							4
22	(Italy) Michele La Rosa	12	12	14	15	12	12	12	Ret	DNS	11	9	11	10	10	4
23	(Mexico) Juan Carlos Sistos									9	Ret					2
24	(Italy) Matteo Beretta	DNS	15	17†	13											0
25	(Austria) Peter Milavec			15	16											0
Pos	Driver	MNZ (Italy)		VAL (Spain)		MAR (Morocco)		HUN (Hungary)		ALG (Portugal)		CUR (Brazil)		SON (United States)		Points

Colour	Result
Gold	Winner
Silver	Second place
Bronze	Third place
Green	Points classification
Blue	Non-points classification
Blue	Non-classified finish (NC)
Purple	Retired, not classified (Ret)
Red	Did not qualify (DNQ)
Red	Did not pre-qualify (DNPQ)
Black	Disqualified (DSQ)
White	Did not start (DNS)
White	Withdrew (WD)
White	Race cancelled (C)
Blank	Did not practice (DNP)
Blank	Did not arrive (DNA)
Blank	Excluded (EX)

**Bold** – Pole for Race One
Italics – Fastest Lap

=== Under-21 Trophy ===
Pos	Driver	MNZ (Italy)		VAL (Spain)		MAR (Morocco)		HUN (Hungary)		ALG (Portugal)		CUR (Brazil)		SON (United States)		Points
1	(United Kingdom) Adrian Quaife-Hobbs	**1**	3	**2**	1	2	4	**1**	2	**1**	1	**6**	12†	**Ret**	2	250
2	(Russia) Sergey Sirotkin	14	4	1	3	**6**	2	13†	3	3	3	3	4	3	1	216
3	(Norway) Pål Varhaug	2	1	3	8	3	7	5	1	2	Ret	2	5	1	5	208
4	(Netherlands) Daniël de Jong	3	Ret	4	4	7	Ret	11	12	7	7	4	3	2	6	137
5	(Argentina) Facu Regalia	4	9	7	2	Ret	10	3	10	6	5					96
6	(Italy) Antonio Spavone	8	5	9	11	8	Ret	8	8	11	8			8	4	96
7	(Brazil) Victor Guerin	15	11	16†	5	Ret	5	2	Ret	4	Ret					66
8	(Brazil) Yann Cunha			13	Ret	9	6									24
10	(Japan) Kotaro Sakurai													7	Ret	12
9	(Italy) Matteo Beretta	DNS	15	17†	13											9
10	(Mexico) Juan Carlos Sistos									9	Ret					6
Pos	Driver	MNZ (Italy)		VAL (Spain)		MAR (Morocco)		HUN (Hungary)		ALG (Portugal)		CUR (Brazil)		SON (United States)		Points

=== Teams' Championship ===
Pos	Team	MNZ (Italy)		VAL (Spain)		MAR (Morocco)		HUN (Hungary)		ALG (Portugal)		CUR (Brazil)		SON (United States)		Points
1	(United Kingdom) Super Nova International	**1**	3	**2**	1	2	4	**1**	2	**1**	1	**6**	12†	**Ret**	2	267
1	(United Kingdom) Super Nova International	15	11	16†	5	Ret	5	2	Ret	4	Ret					267
2	(Netherlands) Manor MP Motorsport	3	2	4	4	4	1	7	5	7	2	4	2	2	6	231
2	(Netherlands) Manor MP Motorsport	5	Ret	6	7	7	Ret	11	12	8	7	5	3			231
3	(Italy) Euronova Racing	8	4	1	3	**6**	2	8	3	3	3	3	4	3	1	219
3	(Italy) Euronova Racing	14	5	9	11	8	Ret	13†	8	11	9	11†	8	7	Ret	219
4	(United Kingdom) Virtuosi UK	2	1	3	8	3	7	5	1	2	10	2	5	1	5	198
4	(United Kingdom) Virtuosi UK	DNS	15	10	10	10	8	10	14	13	Ret	8	9	Ret	9	198
5	(Spain) Campos Racing	4	6	7	2	13	9	3	6	6	5	10†	7	9	7	124
5	(Spain) Campos Racing	7	9	8	6	Ret	10	6	10	12	8	Ret	10	Ret	8	124
6	(Italy) Ombra Racing	9	7	11	12	9	6	4	9	10	6	1	1	6	4	117
6	(Italy) Ombra Racing	13	8	13	Ret	11	11	Ret	13			7	6	8	Ret	117
7	(Italy) Team MLR71	10	12	5	9	1	12	12	7	5	4	9	11	5	10	77
7	(Italy) Team MLR71	12	13	14	15	12	13	Ret	Ret	DNS	11			10	11†	77
8	(Austria) Zele Racing	6	14	15	13	5	3	9	4	9	Ret			4	3	68
8	(Austria) Zele Racing			17†	16					14†	Ret			Ret	12†	68
Pos	Team	MNZ (Italy)		VAL (Spain)		MAR (Morocco)		HUN (Hungary)		ALG (Portugal)		CUR (Brazil)		SON (United States)		Points

Colour	Result
Gold	Winner
Silver	Second place
Bronze	Third place
Green	Points classification
Blue	Non-points classification
Blue	Non-classified finish (NC)
Purple	Retired, not classified (Ret)
Red	Did not qualify (DNQ)
Red	Did not pre-qualify (DNPQ)
Black	Disqualified (DSQ)
White	Did not start (DNS)
White	Withdrew (WD)
White	Race cancelled (C)
Blank	Did not practice (DNP)
Blank	Did not arrive (DNA)
Blank	Excluded (EX)

**Bold** – Pole for Race One
Italics – Fastest Lap
