= Sergio Campana (racing driver) =

Italian racing driver

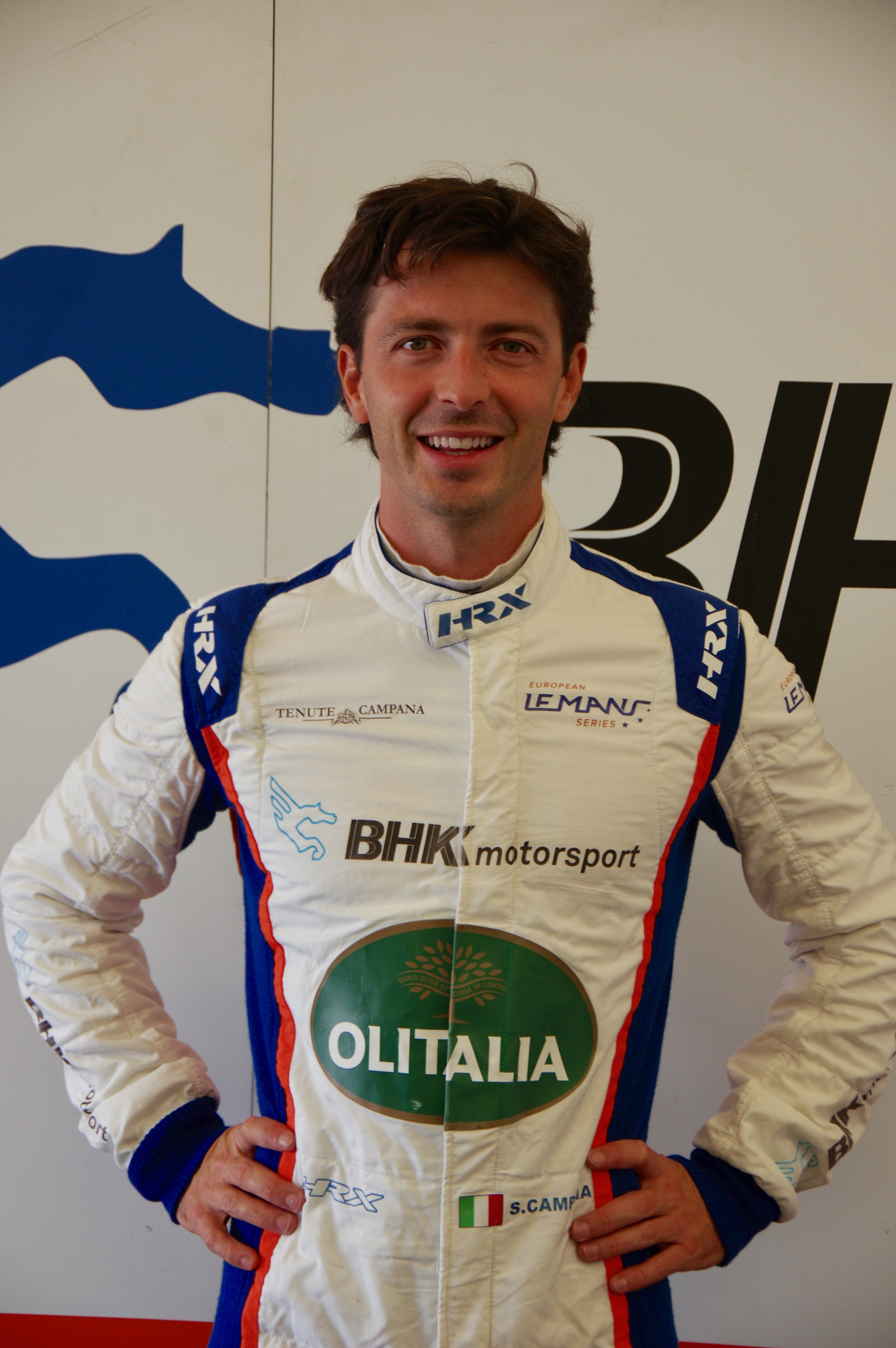
- Campana in 2019
- Nationality: (Italy) Italian
- Born: 5 June 1986 (age 40) Reggio Emilia, Italy

GP2 Series career
- Debut season: 2013
- Current team: Venezuela GP Lazarus
- Categorisation: FIA Gold
- Car number: 25
- Former teams: Trident Racing
- Starts: 5
- Wins: 0
- Poles: 0
- Fastest laps: 0
- Best finish: 30th in 2014

Previous series
- 2012-2014 2009–11 2007–08 2007–08: Auto GP; Italian Formula Three; Formula Renault 2.0 Italia; Eurocup Formula Renault 2.0

Championship titles
- 2011: Italian Formula Three

Sergio Campana (born 5 June 1986 in Reggio Emilia) is an Italian racing driver. He has competed in such series as Eurocup Formula Renault 2.0 and the Italian Formula Three Championship.

== Racing record ==
=== Complete Eurocup Formula Renault 2.0 results ===
(key) (Races in bold indicate pole position; races in italics indicate fastest lap)

Year	Entrant	1	2	3	4	5	6	7	8	9	10	11	12	13	14	DC	Points
2007	Cram Competition	ZOL; 1	ZOL; 2	NÜR; 1	NÜR; 2	HUN; 1	HUN; 2	DON; 1	DON; 2	MAG; 1; 25	MAG; 2; 18	EST; 1	EST; 2	CAT; 1	CAT; 2	NC†	0
2008	Prema Powerteam	SPA; 1	SPA; 2	SIL; 1; 21	SIL; 2; 29	HUN; 1; 9	HUN; 2; 14	NÜR; 1; 19	NÜR; 2; 11	LMS; 1; 21	LMS; 2; 29	EST; 1; 15	EST; 2; 14	CAT; 1 Ret	CAT; 2; 13	25th	2

† As Campana was a guest driver, he was ineligible for points

=== Complete Auto GP results ===
(key)

Year	Entrant	1	2	3	4	5	6	7	8	9	10	11	12	13	14	15	16	Pos	Points
2012	Team MLR71	MNZ; 1; 10	MNZ; 2; 13	VAL; 1; 5	VAL; 2; 9	MAR; 1; 1	MAR; 2; 13	HUN; 1 Ret	HUN; 2; 7	ALG; 1; 5	ALG; 2; 4							6th	90
2012	Euronova Racing											CUR; 1; 11†	CUR; 2; 8					6th	90
2012	Zele Racing													SNM; 1; 4	SNM; 2; 3			6th	90
2013	Ibiza Racing Team	MNZ; 1; 1	MNZ; 2; 4	**MAR**; **1**; 1	MAR; 2 Ret	HUN; 1; 3	HUN; 2; 2	SIL; 1; 7	SIL; 2; 2	MUG; 1; 1	MUG; 2; 12	NÜR; 1; 5	NÜR; 2; 4	DON; 1; 5	DON; 2; 6	BRN; 2; 6	BRN; 2; 2	**3rd**	**197**
2014	Zele Racing	MAR; 1; 10†	MAR; 2 Ret	LEC; 1	LEC; 2	HUN; 1	HUN; 2	MNZ; 1	MNZ; 2	IMO; 1	IMO; 2	RBR; 1	RBR; 2	NÜR; 1	NÜR; 2	EST; 1	EST; 2	21st	1

=== Complete GP2 Series results ===
(key) (Races in bold indicate pole position) (Races in italics indicate fastest lap)

Year	Entrant	1	2	3	4	5	6	7	8	9	10	11	12	13	14	15	16	17	18	19	20	21	22	DC	Points
2013	Trident Racing	SEP; FEA	SEP; SPR	BHR; FEA	BHR; SPR	CAT; FEA	CAT; SPR	MON; FEA	MON; SPR	SIL; FEA	SIL; SPR	NÜR; FEA	NÜR; SPR	HUN; FEA	HUN; SPR	SPA; FEA	SPA; SPR	MNZ; FEA; 15	MNZ; SPR; 24	MRN; FEA	MRN; SPR	YMC; FEA	YMC; SPR	32nd	0
2014	Venezuela GP Lazarus	BHR; FEA	BHR; SPR	CAT; FEA	CAT; SPR	MON; FEA	MON; SPR	RBR; FEA	RBR; SPR	SIL; FEA	SIL; SPR	HOC; FEA	HOC; SPR	HUN; FEA	HUN; SPR	SPA; FEA	SPA; SPR	MNZ; FEA; 15	MNZ; SPR; Ret	SOC; FEA; DNS	SOC; SPR; 20	YMC; FEA	YMC; SPR	30th	0

=== Complete Formula Acceleration 1 results ===
(key) (Races in bold indicate pole position) (Races in italics indicate fastest lap)

Year	Team	1	2	3	4	5	6	7	8	9	10	Pos	Points
2014	France	ALG; 1; 8	ALG; 2; 7									6th	72
2014	Portugal			NAV; 1; 6	NAV; 2 DNS	NÜR; 1; 11	NÜR; 2; 3	MNZ; 1; 5	**MNZ**; **2**; 9			6th	72
2014	Italy									ASS; 1; 2	ASS; 2; 3	6th	72

=== Complete European Le Mans Series results ===
(key) (Races in bold indicate pole position; results in italics indicate fastest lap)

Year	Entrant	Class	Chassis	Engine	1	2	3	4	5	6	Rank	Points
2019	BHK Motorsport	LMP2	Oreca 07	Gibson GK428 4.2 L V8	LEC; 16	MNZ; 15	CAT; 11	SIL; 10	SPA; 11	ALG; 10	24th	4
2020	BHK Motorsport	LMP2	Oreca 07	Gibson GK428 4.2 L V8	LEC; Ret	SPA; Ret	LEC; 14	MNZ; 13	ALG; 13		26th	1.5
2021	BHK Motorsport	LMP2	Oreca 07	Gibson GK428 4.2 L V8	CAT; 13	RBR; 15	LEC; 11	MNZ; 18	SPA; 9	ALG; 9	27th	6
2022	BHK Motorsport	LMP2	Oreca 07	Gibson GK428 4.2 L V8	LEC; 14	IMO; 16	MNZ; 14	CAT; 15	SPA; 13	ALG; 12	25th	0

Sporting positions
Preceded by César Ramos	Italian Formula Three; Champion; 2011	Succeeded by Riccardo Agostini
