= 2010 Formula Palmer Audi season =

2010 Formula Palmer Audi

Seasons
- ← 2009 none →

The 2010 Formula Palmer Audi season was the thirteenth and final Formula Palmer Audi season. It began at Brands Hatch on 8 May and finished at Silverstone Circuit on 17 October. It consisted of twenty rounds, all held in England. The champion driver received a £100,000 scholarship prize, double last year's prize money, towards a drive in the 2011 FIA Formula Two Championship. On top of that, the top six finishers in the final drivers' standings were all granted an official Formula Two test.

The scholarship prize went to Nigel Moore, as he overhauled the long-time leader of the championship Maxime Jousse on dropped scores; Jousse having scored four more points than Moore on overall scores. Whereas Moore could drop two retirements for no points loss, Jousse had to drop a finish of seventh place along with a retirement and turned a four-point advantage into a nine-point deficit to Moore, having won six races to Moore's three. Third place went to Spanish driver Ramón Piñeiro, having taken four wins in the last seven races of the season to enable him to move him up from sixth to his eventual placing of third. Kieran Vernon and José Alonso Liste battled over fourth place, with Vernon coming out on top by two points after his third win of the season – to go with his double at the second Brands Hatch meeting – in the series' final race at Silverstone, ahead of Alonso Liste. Other winners during the season were Melroy Heemskerk at the first Brands Hatch meeting, Max Snegirev at Croft and Jordan Williams, who won at Snetterton before an accident with Jousse in the next race left him without funds to complete the season.

In November 2010, series boss Jonathan Palmer announced the end of the series with the series' chassis being dismantled for use in other areas of the MotorSport Vision organisation.

== Driver lineup ==
Car #	Driver	Sponsor(s)	Rounds
2	(United Kingdom) Howard Fuller	Powerchex	All
3	(France) Vincent Beltoise	Pole Mechanique	All
4	(Italy) Tommaso Menchini	AMP	1–2, 4
5	(France) Maxime Jousse	Warson Motors	All
6	(United Kingdom) Nigel Moore	Ginetta	All
7	(Netherlands) Melroy Heemskerk	ORANJEDAK	1–5
8	(United Kingdom) James Thorp	ARCOROC	1–4
9	(Italy) Giuseppe Cipriani		1–5, 7
10	(Italy) Luca Orlandi	Super 5 Wipes	All
11	(United Kingdom) Ash Davies	H2O Networks	All
12	(Germany) Thiemo Storz		4
14	(Argentina) Jorge Pescador	Luis Pescador	1
15	(Spain) Ramón Piñeiro	Caja Madrid	All
16	(United Kingdom) Aaron Steele		1
17	(United Kingdom) Jordan Williams	Willy's Ice Cream / Lanhydrock Golf Club	1–2
18	(United Kingdom) Callum Holland	Irisguard	2–7
19	(United Kingdom) Tom Ashton	R Ashton & Son Ltd	2
20	(Russia) Max Snegirev	Klaxon	6–7
21	(France) Florian Le Roux	2wcl	7
24	(Spain) Toni Alarcon	Santander	7
25	(Spain) Victor Jiménez		4–7
26	(Spain) José Alonso Liste	Kentes	All
28	(United Kingdom) Kieran Vernon		All
39	(United Kingdom) Matt Bell	AES	1
42	(United Kingdom) Jordan King	Hugo Boss	7
44	(United Kingdom) Mark Powell	FutureWorld	3, 5

== Race calendar and results ==
- All races were held in the United Kingdom.

Round		Circuit	Date	Pole position	Fastest lap	Winning driver
1	R1	Brands Hatch Indy	9 May	(Argentina) Jorge Pescador	(Spain) José Alonso Liste	(Netherlands) Melroy Heemskerk
1	R2	Brands Hatch Indy	9 May	(France) Maxime Jousse	(Spain) José Alonso Liste	(France) Maxime Jousse
1	R3	Brands Hatch Indy	9 May	(France) Maxime Jousse	(France) Maxime Jousse	(France) Maxime Jousse
2	R1	Snetterton Motor Racing Circuit	26 June	(United Kingdom) Nigel Moore	(Netherlands) Melroy Heemskerk	(United Kingdom) Jordan Williams
2	R2	Snetterton Motor Racing Circuit	26 June	(United Kingdom) Nigel Moore	(France) Maxime Jousse	(France) Maxime Jousse
2	R3	Snetterton Motor Racing Circuit	27 June	(France) Maxime Jousse	(France) Maxime Jousse	(France) Maxime Jousse
2	R4	Snetterton Motor Racing Circuit	27 June	(France) Maxime Jousse	(France) Maxime Jousse	(France) Maxime Jousse
3	R1	Oulton Park	24 July	(United Kingdom) Nigel Moore	(France) Maxime Jousse	(United Kingdom) Nigel Moore
3	R2	Oulton Park	24 July	(United Kingdom) Nigel Moore	(France) Maxime Jousse	(France) Maxime Jousse
4	R1	Rockingham Motor Speedway	28 August	(Spain) José Alonso Liste	(Germany) Thiemo Storz	(United Kingdom) Nigel Moore
4	R2	Rockingham Motor Speedway	28 August	(Spain) José Alonso Liste	(Spain) José Alonso Liste	(Spain) José Alonso Liste
5	R1	Brands Hatch GP	26 September	(United Kingdom) Kieran Vernon	(United Kingdom) Kieran Vernon	(United Kingdom) Kieran Vernon
5	R2	Brands Hatch GP	26 September	(United Kingdom) Kieran Vernon	(United Kingdom) Kieran Vernon	(United Kingdom) Kieran Vernon
6	R1	Croft Circuit	9 October	(Spain) Ramón Piñeiro	(United Kingdom) Callum Holland	(Spain) Ramón Piñeiro
6	R2	Croft Circuit	10 October	(Spain) José Alonso Liste	(Spain) José Alonso Liste	(Spain) Ramón Piñeiro
6	R3	Croft Circuit	10 October	(United Kingdom) Callum Holland	(United Kingdom) Callum Holland	(Russia) Max Snegirev
7	R1	Silverstone National	16 October	(United Kingdom) Jordan King	(Spain) Ramón Piñeiro	(Spain) Ramón Piñeiro
7	R2	Silverstone National	16 October	(Spain) Ramón Piñeiro	(Spain) Ramón Piñeiro	(Spain) Ramón Piñeiro
7	R3	Silverstone National	17 October	(United Kingdom) Nigel Moore	(Spain) José Alonso Liste	(United Kingdom) Nigel Moore
7	R4	Silverstone National	17 October	(Spain) José Alonso Liste	(Spain) José Alonso Liste	(United Kingdom) Kieran Vernon

== Championship standings ==
Pos	Driver	BRH			SNE				OUL		ROC		BRH		CRO			SIL				Total	Drop	Points
1	(United Kingdom) Nigel Moore	3	2	2	**2**	**2**	4	Ret	**1**	**Ret**	1	2	6	4	2	4	4	2	2	**1**	4	344		344
2	(France) Maxime Jousse	5	**1**	**1**	3	1	**1**	**1**	2	1	6	6	3	6	7	3	6	5	4	5	Ret	348	13	335
3	(Spain) Ramón Piñeiro	2	3	8	5	3	11	4	Ret	2	Ret	7	2	3	**1**	1	7	1	**1**	3	6	320		320
4	(United Kingdom) Kieran Vernon	6	7	6	8	7	Ret	5	4	4	3	3	**1**	**1**	3	6	9	4	5	4	1	311	11	300
5	(Spain) José Alonso Liste	11	4	4	6	8	3	3	5	3	**7**	**1**	8	5	5	**2**	2	6	3	Ret	**2**	307	9	298
6	(France) Vincent Beltoise	NC	5	13	4	4	5	7	3	6	5	4	5	10	4	7	5	7	Ret	9	8	250		250
7	(United Kingdom) Howard Fuller	8	10	9	14	6	7	14	7	12	8	8	9	8	Ret	8	10	12	6	7	7	210	6	204
8	(Netherlands) Melroy Heemskerk	1	Ret	5	7	5	2	2	6	5	4	5	4	2								203		203
9	(United Kingdom) Callum Holland				9	14	8	6	11	9	10	11	7	7	6	Ret	**3**	8	8	6	5	193		193
10	(United Kingdom) Ash Davies	Ret	11	10	13	11	12	12	8	8	12	Ret	10	9	9	9	8	10	9	11	10	178		178
11	(Italy) Giuseppe Cipriani	Ret	16	Ret	11	9	6	11	9	7	14	9	12	12				9	7	8	11	149		149
12	(Italy) Luca Orlandi	Ret	14	14	16	12	14	13	12	Ret	15	13	11	Ret	8	10	11	14	13	13	13	124		124
13	(Russia) Max Snegirev														10	5	1	3	11	10	3	104		104
14	(United Kingdom) James Thorp	10	13	15	10	Ret	10	8	10	10	11	10										93		93
15	(United Kingdom) Jordan Williams	4	8	7	1	DNS	9	10														86		86
16	(Spain) Victor Jiménez										13	12	13	13	Ret	11	12	13	10	14	12	77		77
17	(United Kingdom) Aaron Steele	7	6	3																		45		45
18	(Italy) Tommaso Menchini	Ret	15	Ret	15	13	13	Ret			9	14										41		41
19	(Spain) Toni Alarcon																	11	14	12	9	34		34
20	(United Kingdom) Matt Bell	9	9	11																		31		31
21	(United Kingdom) Mark Powell								13	11			14	11								31		31
22	(United Kingdom) Tom Ashton				12	10	Ret	9														29		29
23	(United Kingdom) Jordan King																	**NC**	Ret	2	Ret	20		20
24	(Germany) Thiemo Storz										2	Ret										20		20
25	(France) Florian Le Roux																	Ret	12	15	14	19		19
26	(Argentina) Jorge Pescador	**Ret**	12	12																		16		16
Pos	Driver	BRH			SNE				OUL		ROC		BRH		CRO			SIL				Total	Drop	Points

Colour	Result
Gold	Winner
Silver	Second place
Bronze	Third place
Green	Points classification
Blue	Non-points classification
Blue	Non-classified finish (NC)
Purple	Retired, not classified (Ret)
Red	Did not qualify (DNQ)
Red	Did not pre-qualify (DNPQ)
Black	Disqualified (DSQ)
White	Did not start (DNS)
White	Withdrew (WD)
White	Race cancelled (C)
Blank	Did not practice (DNP)
Blank	Did not arrive (DNA)
Blank	Excluded (EX)

**Bold** – Pole
Italics – Fastest lap

Position	1st	2nd	3rd	4th	5th	6th	7th	8th	9th	10th	11th	12th	13th	14th	15th	16th	17th	18th	19th
Points	24	20	18	16	15	14	13	12	11	10	9	8	7	6	5	4	3	2	1
