= Daniël de Jong =

Dutch racing driver

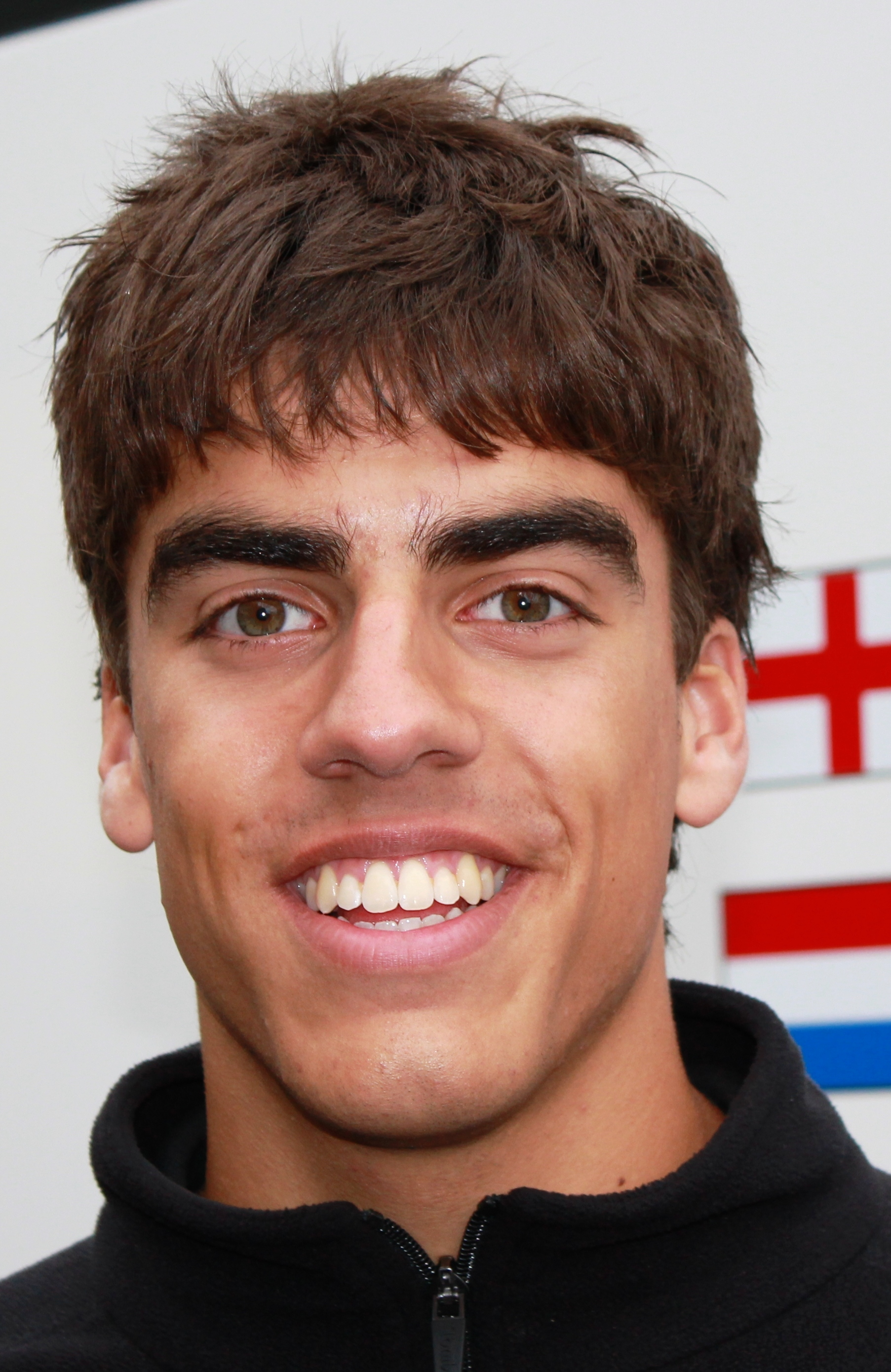
- Nationality: (Netherlands) Dutch
- Born: 9 July 1992 (age 34) Rotterdam, Netherlands

GP2 Series career
- Debut season: 2012
- Categorisation: FIA Silver
- Car number: 23
- Former teams: Trident, Rapax, MP Motorsport
- Starts: 90
- Wins: 0
- Poles: 0
- Fastest laps: 0
- Best finish: 21st in 2016

Previous series
- 2012, 2015-16 2011–13 2011 2009–10 2008–10 2008 2008 2008 2005–06, 2009–10: GP2 Series; Auto GP; Formula Renault 3.5 Series; Eurocup Formula Renault 2.0; Formula Renault 2.0 NEC; Finnish Formula Renault 2.0; Formula Renault 2.0 NEZ; Formula Renault 2.0 WEC; Dutch Winter; Endurance Series

Daniël de Jong (born 9 July 1992) is a Dutch auto racing driver who last competed in 2025 Middle East Trophy in the GT3 Class for MP Motorsport.

== Career ==
=== Formula Renault 2.0 ===
After a lengthy karting career in his native Holland and a brief stint in the Dutch Winter Endurance Series, de Jong made his single–seater debut in 2008 in the Formula Renault 2.0 Northern European Cup (NEC), finishing the season 13th overall. He also contested two races in the Formula Renault 2.0 NEZ series, taking two pole positions and a race victory to finish the season in eighth place, and a single round of the Formula Renault 2.0 West European Cup at Spa–Francorchamps.

In 2009, de Jong took part in both the Eurocup Formula Renault 2.0 and Formula Renault 2.0 NEC championships with MP Motorsport. In the Eurocup, he took a single points–finish at the Hungaroring to be classified in 25th place, whilst in the NEC series, he took podium places at the Nürburgring and Spa–Francorchamps to finish ninth, despite missing the third round of the season at Alastaro.

2010 saw de Jong remain in the Eurocup Formula Renault 2.0 series for a second season. After finishing second to Kevin Korjus in the first race of the season at Motorland Aragón, he finished in the points on a further eight occasions to finish 9th in the standings. He also took part in selected events of the Formula Renault 2.0 NEC season, taking a race win at the final event of the season at the Nürburgring together with a second–place at Brno earlier in the season. He finished the year 11th in the standings, despite only taking part in six of the 18 races.

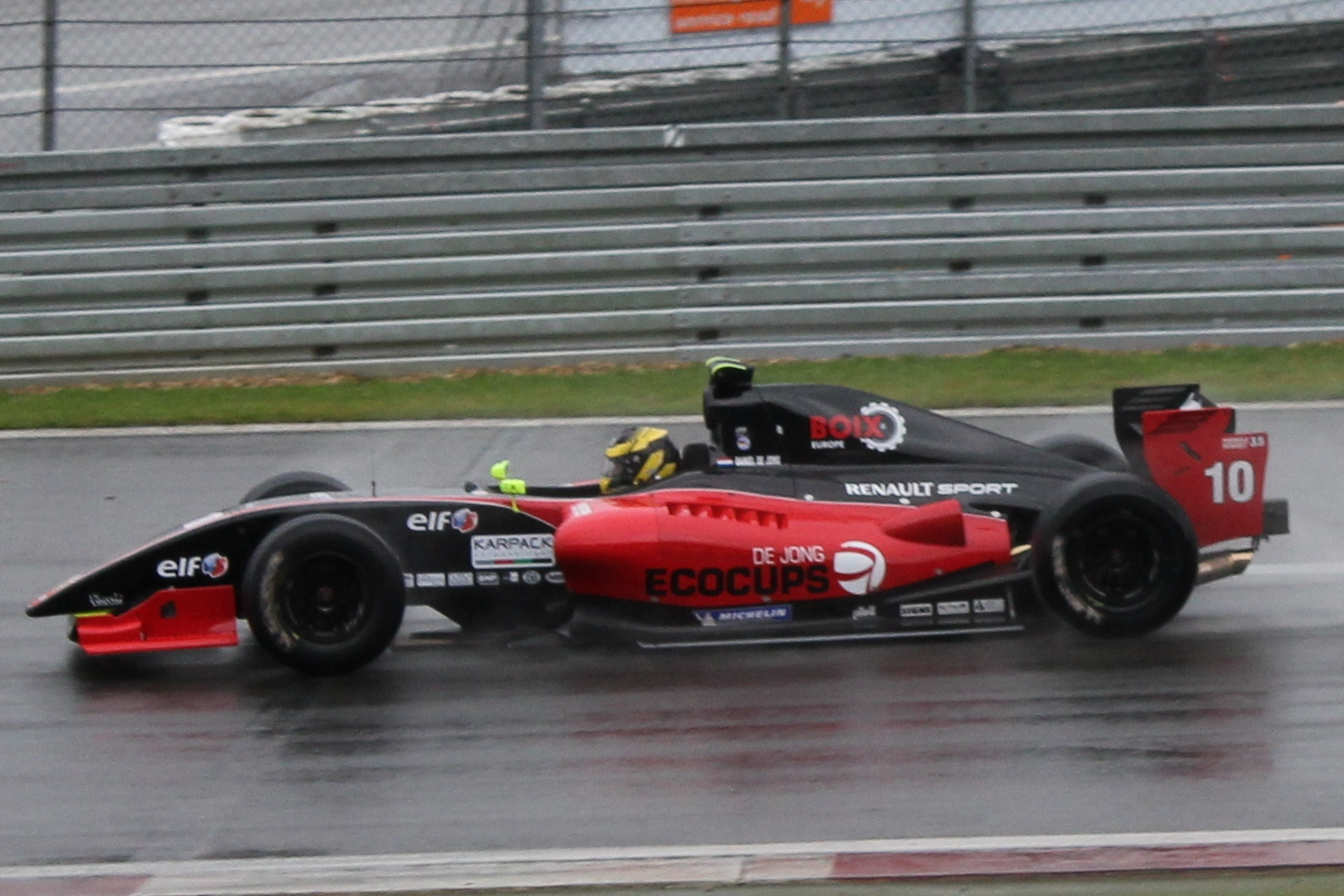
Daniël de Jong at the 2011 Nürburgring World series by Renault round

=== Formula Renault 3.5 Series ===
In October 2010, de Jong drove a Formula Renault 3.5 Series car for the first time, testing for Draco Racing at the first post–season test in Barcelona. A week later, he tested for Comtec Racing at Motorland Aragón, and it was announced in February 2011 that he had signed to race for the team in the 2011 season, partnering British Formula 3 graduate Daniel McKenzie.

=== Auto GP ===
Alongside his Formula Renault 3.5 commitments, de Jong also contested the Auto GP season in 2011, driving for his long–time Formula Renault 2.0 team MP Motorsport. He remained with the team (now in a partnership with Manor Motorsport) for the 2012 season.

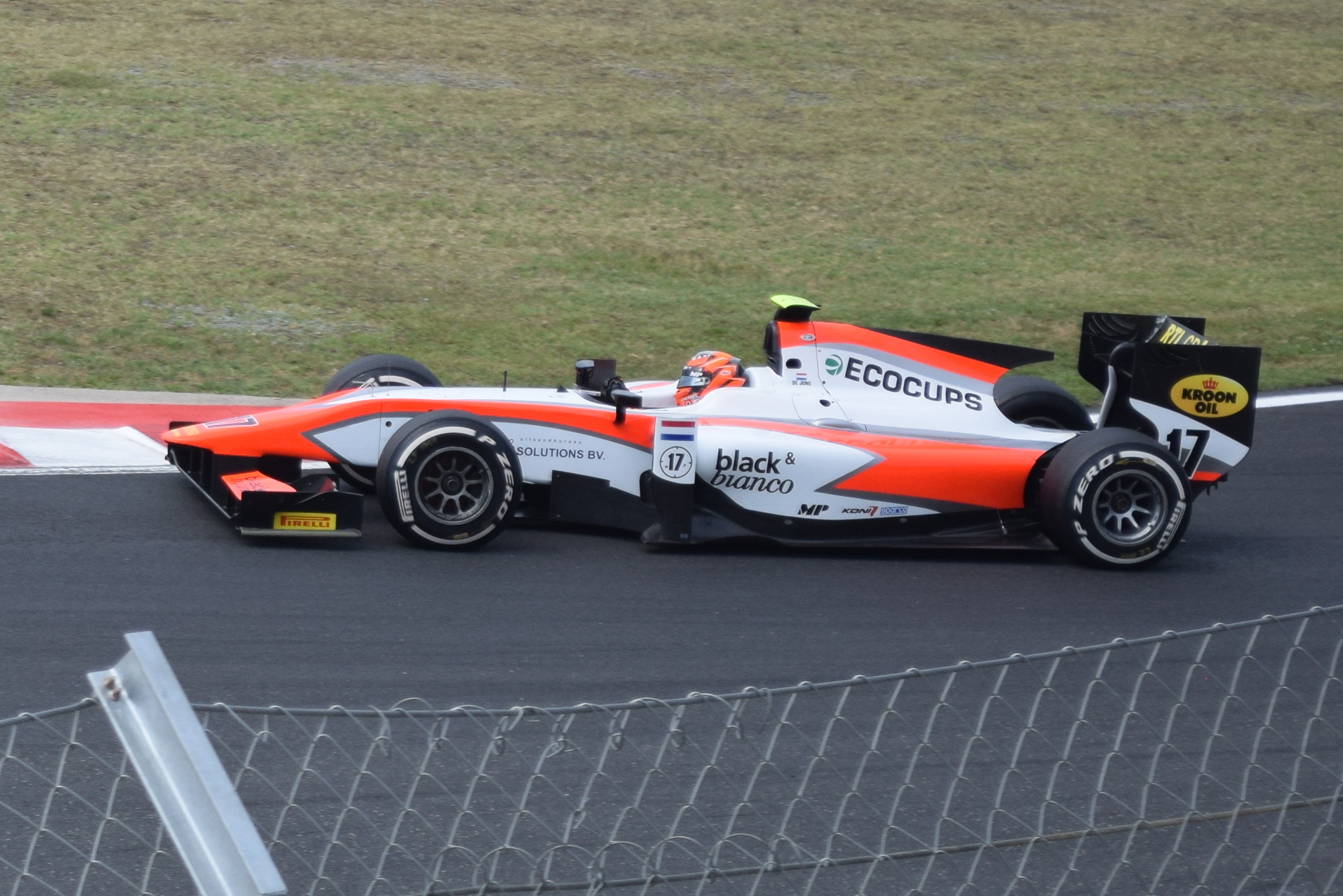
Daniël de Jong in GP2 (Hungary 2015)

=== GP2 Series ===
In 2012, de Jong made his GP2 Series debut at the Valencia Street Circuit, driving for the Rapax team. He also drove for the team at Silverstone, and will also do so at the Hungaroring and at Circuit de Spa-Francorchamps. He is the third Dutchman in the championship, alongside Giedo van der Garde and Nigel Melker. He missed the round at Hockenheim due to his Auto GP commitments, but returned to action in the next round at the Hungaroring. He was then replaced by Stefano Coletti for the round at Monza.

== Racing record ==
=== Career summary ===
| Season | Series | Team | Races | Wins | Poles | F/Laps | Podiums | Points | Position |
|---|---|---|---|---|---|---|---|---|---|
| 2005–06 | Dutch Winter Endurance Series | ? | ? | 0 | ? | ? | ? | ? | 227th |
| 2008 | Formula Renault 2.0 NEC | MP Motorsport | 16 | 0 | 0 | 0 | 0 | 119 | 13th |
| 2008 | Formula Renault 2.0 NEZ | MP Motorsport | 2 | 1 | 2 | 0 | 2 | 46 | 8th |
| 2008 | Formula Renault 2.0 WEC | MP Motorsport | 2 | 0 | 0 | 0 | 0 | 0 | NC† |
| 2009 | Eurocup Formula Renault 2.0 | MP Motorsport | 14 | 0 | 0 | 0 | 0 | 3 | 25th |
| 2009 | Formula Renault 2.0 NEC | MP Motorsport | 14 | 0 | 0 | 0 | 2 | 164 | 9th |
| 2009–10 | Dutch Winter Endurance Series | De Heus by Bas Koeten | 1 | 0 | 0 | 0 | 0 | 10 | 100th |
| 2010 | Eurocup Formula Renault 2.0 | MP Motorsport | 16 | 0 | 0 | 0 | 1 | 48 | 9th |
| 2010 | Formula Renault 2.0 NEC | MP Motorsport | 6 | 1 | 2 | 3 | 2 | 105 | 11th |
| 2011 | Formula Renault 3.5 Series | Comtec Racing | 17 | 0 | 0 | 0 | 0 | 2 | 29th |
| 2011 | Auto GP | MP Motorsport | 6 | 0 | 0 | 0 | 0 | 19 | 14th |
| 2012 | Auto GP World Series | Manor MP Motorsport | 16 | 0 | 0 | 3 | 3 | 104 | 5th |
| 2012 | GP2 Series | Rapax | 8 | 0 | 0 | 0 | 0 | 0 | 26th |
| 2013 | Auto GP | Manor MP Motorsport | 13 | 0 | 0 | 0 | 2 | 77 | 7th |
| 2013 | GP2 Series | MP Motorsport | 22 | 0 | 0 | 0 | 0 | 3 | 24th |
| 2014 | GP2 Series | MP Motorsport | 22 | 0 | 0 | 0 | 0 | 2 | 28th |
| 2014 | MW-V6 Pickup Series | Team Netherlands | 6 | 1 | 1 | 1 | 2 | 70 | 4th |
| 2015 | GP2 Series | MP Motorsport | 13 | 0 | 0 | 0 | 0 | 1 | 23rd |
| 2015 | GP2 Series | Trident | 3 | 0 | 0 | 0 | 0 | 1 | 23rd |
| 2016 | GP2 Series | MP Motorsport | 22 | 0 | 0 | 0 | 0 | 6 | 21st |
| 2016 | 24H Series - A6 | GDL Racing | 1 | 0 | 0 | 0 | 0 | 0 | NC† |
| 2017 | 24H Series - SPX | Eurotrac by Bas Koeten | | | | | | | |
| 2018 | 24H GT Series - A6 | MP Motorsport | 1 | 0 | 0 | 0 | 0 | 17 | NC† |
| 2019 | 24H GT Series - A6 | MP Motorsport | 1 | 0 | 0 | 0 | 0 | 0 | NC† |
| 2020 | 24H GT Series - GT3 AM | MP Motorsport | 1 | 1 | 0 | 0 | 1 | 29 | NC† |
| 2021 | 24H GT Series - GT3 | MP Motorsport | 1 | 0 | 0 | 0 | 0 | 21 | 59th |
| 2022 | 24H GT Series - GT3 | MP Motorsport | 1 | 0 | 0 | 0 | 0 | 14 | NC† |
| 2022–23 | Middle East Trophy - GT3 | MP Motorsport | 1 | 0 | 0 | 0 | 0 | 0 | NC† |
| 2025 | Middle East Trophy - GT3 | MP Motorsport | 1 | 0 | 0 | 0 | 0 | 0 | NC† |

^{†} As de Jong was a guest driver, he was ineligible for championship points.

=== Complete Formula Renault 2.0 NEC results ===
(key) (Races in bold indicate pole position) (Races in italics indicate fastest lap)

| Year | Entrant | 1 | 2 | 3 | 4 | 5 | 6 | 7 | 8 | 9 | 10 | 11 | 12 | 13 | 14 | 15 | 16 | 17 | 18 | 19 | 20 | DC | Points |
|---|---|---|---|---|---|---|---|---|---|---|---|---|---|---|---|---|---|---|---|---|---|---|---|
| 2008 | MP Motorsport | HOC; 1; 20 | HOC; 2; 12 | ZAN; 1; 20 | ZAN; 2; 13 | ALA; 1; 17 | ALA; 2; 12 | OSC; 1; 6 | OSC; 2; 8 | ASS; 1; 8 | ASS; 2; 16 | ZOL; 1; 15 | ZOL; 2; 6 | NÜR; 1; 9 | NÜR; 2; 14 | SPA; 1 Ret | SPA; 2; 20 | | | | | 13th | 118 |
| 2009 | MP Motorsport | ZAN; 1; 7 | ZAN; 2; 6 | HOC; 1; 10 | HOC; 2; 18 | ALA; 1 | ALA; 2 | OSC; 1; 8 | OSC; 2 Ret | ASS; 1; 7 | ASS; 2; 10 | MST; 1 Ret | MST; 2; 8 | NÜR; 1; 3 | NÜR; 2; 7 | SPA; 1; 3 | SPA; 2; 5 | | | | | 9th | 164 |
| 2010 | MP Motorsport | HOC; 1 | HOC; 2 | BRN; 1 Ret | BRN; 2; 2 | ZAN; 1 | ZAN; 2 | OSC; 1 | OSC; 2 | OSC; 3 | ASS; 1; 4 | ASS; 2; 4 | MST; 1 | MST; 2 | MST; 3 | SPA; 1 | SPA; 2 | SPA; 3 | **NÜR**; **1**; 1 | NÜR; 2; 4 | **NÜR**; **3** C | 11th | 105 |

=== Complete Eurocup Formula Renault 2.0 results ===
(key) (Races in bold indicate pole position; races in italics indicate fastest lap)

| Year | Entrant | 1 | 2 | 3 | 4 | 5 | 6 | 7 | 8 | 9 | 10 | 11 | 12 | 13 | 14 | 15 | 16 | DC | Points |
|---|---|---|---|---|---|---|---|---|---|---|---|---|---|---|---|---|---|---|---|
| 2009 | MP Motorsport | CAT; 1; 11 | CAT; 2; 21 | SPA; 1; 18 | SPA; 2; 19 | HUN; 1 Ret | HUN; 2; 8 | SIL; 1 Ret | SIL; 2 Ret | LMS; 1 Ret | LMS; 2 Ret | NÜR; 1 Ret | NÜR; 2 Ret | ALC; 1; 19 | ALC; 2 Ret | | | 25th | 3 |
| 2010 | MP Motorsport | ALC; 1; 2 | ALC; 2; 16 | SPA; 1; 17 | SPA; 2; 7 | BRN; 1; 8 | BRN; 2 Ret | MAG; 1 Ret | MAG; 2; 5 | HUN; 1 Ret | HUN; 2; 15 | HOC; 1; 14 | HOC; 2; 10 | SIL; 1; 11 | SIL; 2; 7 | CAT; 1; 4 | CAT; 2; 10 | 9th | 48 |

=== Complete Formula Renault 3.5 Series results ===
(key) (Races in bold indicate pole position) (Races in italics indicate fastest lap)

| Year | Entrant | 1 | 2 | 3 | 4 | 5 | 6 | 7 | 8 | 9 | 10 | 11 | 12 | 13 | 14 | 15 | 16 | 17 | DC | Points |
|---|---|---|---|---|---|---|---|---|---|---|---|---|---|---|---|---|---|---|---|---|
| 2011 | Comtec Racing | ALC; 1; 19 | ALC; 2; 15 | SPA; 1 Ret | SPA; 2 Ret | MNZ; 1; 14 | MNZ; 2; 14 | MON; 1; 19 | NÜR; 1; 16 | NÜR; 2; 19 | HUN; 1; 16 | HUN; 2; 18 | SIL; 1; 18 | SIL; 2 Ret | LEC; 1; 20 | LEC; 2; 12 | CAT; 1; 16 | CAT; 2; 9 | 29th | 2 |

=== Complete Auto GP Results ===
(key) (Races in bold indicate pole position) (Races in italics indicate fastest lap)

| Year | Entrant | 1 | 2 | 3 | 4 | 5 | 6 | 7 | 8 | 9 | 10 | 11 | 12 | 13 | 14 | 15 | 16 | Pos | Points |
|---|---|---|---|---|---|---|---|---|---|---|---|---|---|---|---|---|---|---|---|
| 2011 | MP Motorsport | MNZ; 1 | MNZ; 2 | HUN; 1 | HUN; 2 | BRN; 1 | BRN; 2 | DON; 1; 6 | DON; 2; 8 | OSC; 1; 6 | OSC; 2; 7 | VAL; 1; 13 | VAL; 2; 11 | MUG; 1 | MUG; 2 | | | 14th | 19 |
| 2012 | Manor MP Motorsport | MNZ; 1; 3 | MNZ; 2 Ret | VAL; 1; 4 | VAL; 2; 4 | MAR; 1; 7 | MAR; 2 Ret | HUN; 1; 11 | HUN; 2; 12 | ALG; 1; 7 | ALG; 2; 7 | CUR; 1; 4 | CUR; 2; 3 | SON; 1; 2 | SON; 2; 6 | | | 5th | 104 |
| 2013 | Manor MP Motorsport | MNZ; 1 | MNZ; 2 | MAR; 1; 2 | MAR; 2 Ret | HUN; 1; 7 | HUN; 2; 7 | SIL; 1; 4 | SIL; 2; 6 | MUG; 1 DNS | MUG; 2; 7 | NÜR; 1 Ret | NÜR; 2; 3 | DON; 1; 6 | DON; 2; 13 | BRN; 2; 9 | BRN; 2; 8 | 7th | 77 |

=== Complete GP2 Series results ===
(key) (Races in bold indicate pole position) (Races in italics indicate fastest lap)

| Year | Entrant | 1 | 2 | 3 | 4 | 5 | 6 | 7 | 8 | 9 | 10 | 11 | 12 | 13 | 14 | 15 | 16 | 17 | 18 | 19 | 20 | 21 | 22 | 23 | 24 | DC | Points |
|---|---|---|---|---|---|---|---|---|---|---|---|---|---|---|---|---|---|---|---|---|---|---|---|---|---|---|---|
| 2012 | Rapax Team | SEP; FEA | SEP; SPR | BHR1; FEA | BHR1; SPR | BHR2; FEA | BHR2; SPR | CAT; FEA | CAT; SPR | MON; FEA | MON; SPR | VAL; FEA; 16 | VAL; SPR; 9 | SIL; FEA; Ret | SIL; SPR; 13 | HOC; FEA | HOC; SPR | HUN; FEA; 15 | HUN; SPR; 19 | SPA; FEA; 13 | SPA; SPR; 11 | MNZ; FEA | MNZ; SPR | MRN; FEA | MRN; SPR | 26th | 0 |
| 2013 | MP Motorsport | SEP; FEA; Ret | SEP; SPR; 14 | BHR; FEA; Ret | BHR; SPR; 19 | CAT; FEA; 16 | CAT; SPR; 18 | MON; FEA; 10 | MON; SPR; 9 | SIL; FEA; 22 | SIL; SPR; 18 | NÜR; FEA; 15 | NÜR; SPR; Ret | HUN; FEA; 12 | HUN; SPR; Ret | SPA; FEA; Ret | SPA; SPR; 17 | MNZ; FEA; 11 | MNZ; SPR; 19 | MRN; FEA; 17 | MRN; SPR; 7 | YMC; FEA; 19† | YMC; SPR; 17 | | | 24th | 3 |
| 2014 | MP Motorsport | BHR; FEA; 11 | BHR; SPR; 11 | CAT; FEA; Ret | CAT; SPR; 19 | MON; FEA; 11 | MON; SPR; Ret | RBR; FEA; 19 | RBR; SPR; 21 | SIL; FEA; 19 | SIL; SPR; 14 | HOC; FEA; Ret | HOC; SPR; 16 | HUN; FEA; 14 | HUN; SPR; 18 | SPA; FEA; 10 | SPA; SPR; 13 | MNZ; FEA; Ret | MNZ; SPR; 9 | SOC; FEA; 14 | SOC; SPR; 19 | YMC; FEA; 10 | YMC; SPR; Ret | | | 28th | 2 |
| 2015 | MP Motorsport | BHR; FEA; 18 | BHR; SPR; 13 | CAT; FEA; 15 | CAT; SPR; 9 | MON; FEA; 12 | MON; SPR; 12 | RBR; FEA; 21 | RBR; SPR; 12 | SIL; FEA; 11 | SIL; SPR; 26† | HUN; FEA; 10 | HUN; SPR; Ret | SPA; FEA; Ret | SPA; SPR; DNS | MNZ; FEA | MNZ; SPR | SOC; FEA | SOC; SPR | | | | | | | 23rd | 1 |
| 2015 | Trident | | | | | | | | | | | | | | | | | | | BHR; FEA; 19 | BHR; SPR; 14 | YMC; FEA; Ret | YMC; SPR; C | | | 23rd | 1 |
| 2016 | MP Motorsport | CAT; FEA; 14 | CAT; SPR; 17 | MON; FEA; 9 | MON; SPR; 11 | BAK; FEA; 8 | BAK; SPR; 14 | RBR; FEA; 14 | RBR; SPR; 20 | SIL; FEA; 19 | SIL; SPR; 16 | HUN; FEA; 15 | HUN; SPR; 11 | HOC; FEA; Ret | HOC; SPR; 16 | SPA; FEA; 17 | SPA; SPR; 17 | MNZ; FEA; 17 | MNZ; SPR; 19 | SEP; FEA; 17 | SEP; SPR; Ret | YMC; FEA; 14 | YMC; SPR; Ret | | | 21st | 6 |

^{†} Driver did not finish, but was classified as he completed over 90% of the race distance.
