= 2014 GP2 Series =

Season of Formula One feeder championship

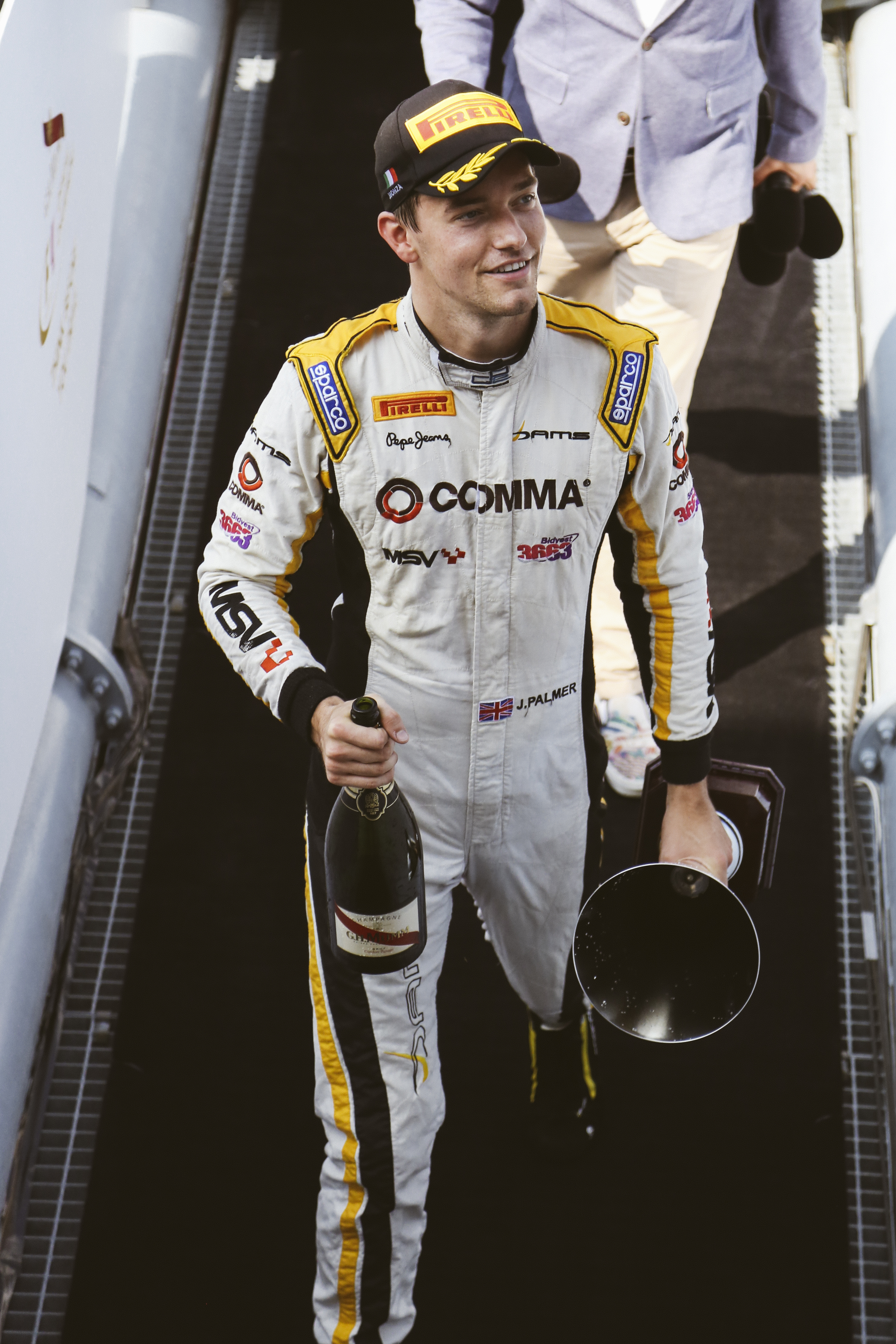
2014 champion Jolyon Palmer

The 2014 GP2 Series season was the forty-eighth season of the second-tier of Formula One feeder championship and also tenth season under the GP2 Series moniker, a support series to the 2014 Formula One World Championship. Russian Time were the defending team champions.

In his fourth season in the series, DAMS driver Jolyon Palmer won the championship title after a consistent season, with points-scoring finishes in 20 of the campaign's 22 races. He won four races – joint-most for the season, along with Stoffel Vandoorne and Felipe Nasr – and achieved twelve podium finishes, en route to the title, which he won in Russia. The battle for the runner-up position in the championship standings was not decided until the final race of the season, between Vandoorne and Nasr. It was ultimately settled in favour of Vandoorne, by five points, after a fifth-place finish compared to Nasr's second-place finish. Vandoorne, a rookie in the series after moving from Formula Renault 3.5, had started the season with a victory in his first start in Bahrain, and also won at the Hungaroring, Monza, and Abu Dhabi. After two winless years in the series, Nasr took his first GP2 victory in his 50th start, in Montmeló. He also achieved wins at the Red Bull Ring, Silverstone, and Spa-Francorchamps, before his graduation to Formula One for the 2015 season.

A trio of double race-winners filled positions four, five and six in the final drivers' championship standings. Mitch Evans – driving for defending teams' champions RT Russian Time – was another first-time winner in the series, taking back-to-back feature race victories at Silverstone and Hockenheim, the latter from 15th on the grid. Fifth place went to Johnny Cecotto Jr. for the Trident team, recording his best season in the series, which included victories in Montmeló and Spielberg. Racing Engineering driver Stefano Coletti completed the championship top six, with sprint race victories at Hockenheim and Abu Dhabi. Four other drivers won on one occasion, and for each, was their first GP2 victory. Stéphane Richelmi won the sprint race, for DAMS, on home soil in Monaco, matching Coletti's feat from the previous season. Rookies Arthur Pic (Campos Racing) and Raffaele Marciello (Racing Engineering) won the feature races at the Hungaroring and Spa-Francorchamps respectively, while Marco Sørensen achieved the first victory for MP Motorsport, with sprint race success in Sochi.

DAMS were the winners of the teams' championship for the second time in three seasons – after a similar title sweep with Davide Valsecchi winning the drivers' championship in 2012 – finishing 57 points clear of closest competitors, Carlin. ART Grand Prix finished a further 37 points in arrears, completing the championship top trio.

== Regulation changes ==
The 2013 season was originally proposed to be the last season with the third-generation GP2 chassis, the Dallara GP2/11, which was introduced in 2011, but it was decided that the series would continue to use this chassis for a further three years in order to avoid a leap in costs to the competitors. The series continued to use tyres provided by Pirelli.

Free practice sessions were extended from 30 to 45 minutes long. Drivers were required to use both the harder "Prime" and softer "Option" tyre compounds during a Feature Race – unless declared a wet race – mirroring the rules of Formula One. Previously, drivers had been free to use both compounds as they saw fit, provided both were used over the course of a race meeting.

== Teams and drivers ==
Team	No.	Drivers	Rounds
(Russia) RT Russian Time	1	(New Zealand) Mitch Evans	All
(Russia) RT Russian Time	2	(Russia) Artem Markelov	All
(United Kingdom) Carlin	3	(Brazil) Felipe Nasr	All
(United Kingdom) Carlin	4	(Colombia) Julián Leal	All
(Spain) Racing Engineering	5	(Italy) Raffaele Marciello	All
(Spain) Racing Engineering	6	(Monaco) Stefano Coletti	All
(France) DAMS	7	(United Kingdom) Jolyon Palmer	All
(France) DAMS	8	(Monaco) Stéphane Richelmi	All
(France) ART Grand Prix	9	(Japan) Takuya Izawa	All
(France) ART Grand Prix	10	(Belgium) Stoffel Vandoorne	All
(Germany) Hilmer Motorsport	11	(Germany) Daniel Abt	1–10
(Germany) Hilmer Motorsport	11	(Canada) Nicholas Latifi	11
(Germany) Hilmer Motorsport	12	(Argentina) Facu Regalia	1–4
(Germany) Hilmer Motorsport	12	(United Kingdom) Jon Lancaster	5–11
(Italy) Rapax	14	(United Kingdom) Adrian Quaife-Hobbs	1–9
(Italy) Rapax	14	(Cyprus) Tio Ellinas	10
(Italy) Rapax	14	(Italy) Kevin Giovesi	11
(Italy) Rapax	15	(Switzerland) Simon Trummer	All
(United Kingdom) Arden International	16	(Austria) René Binder	All
(United Kingdom) Arden International	17	(Brazil) André Negrão	1, 3–11
(United Kingdom) Arden International	17	(France) Tom Dillmann	2
(Malaysia) EQ8 Caterham Racing (1–8) (Malaysia) Caterham Racing (9–11)	18	(Indonesia) Rio Haryanto	All
(Malaysia) EQ8 Caterham Racing (1–8) (Malaysia) Caterham Racing (9–11)	19	(United States) Alexander Rossi	1–5
(Malaysia) EQ8 Caterham Racing (1–8) (Malaysia) Caterham Racing (9–11)	19	(France) Tom Dillmann	6–8
(Malaysia) EQ8 Caterham Racing (1–8) (Malaysia) Caterham Racing (9–11)	19	(France) Pierre Gasly	9–11
(Netherlands) MP Motorsport	20	(Netherlands) Daniël de Jong	All
(Netherlands) MP Motorsport	21	(United Kingdom) Jon Lancaster	1
(Netherlands) MP Motorsport	21	(Cyprus) Tio Ellinas	2–4
(Netherlands) MP Motorsport	21	(Denmark) Marco Sørensen	5–11
(Italy) Trident	22	(Zimbabwe) Axcil Jefferies	1
(Italy) Trident	22	(Spain) Sergio Canamasas	2–11
(Italy) Trident	23	(Venezuela) Johnny Cecotto Jr. (Note: Cecotto competed under a state Venezuelan racing licence.)	All
(Italy) Venezuela GP Lazarus (Note: Venezuela GP Lazarus competed under a Venezuelan licence in round 1.)	24	(France) Nathanaël Berthon	All
(Italy) Venezuela GP Lazarus	25	(United States) Conor Daly	1–8, 11
(Italy) Venezuela GP Lazarus	25	(Italy) Sergio Campana	9–10
(Spain) Campos Racing	26	(France) Arthur Pic	All
(Spain) Campos Racing	27	(Japan) Kimiya Sato	1–5, 7–11
(Spain) Campos Racing	27	(United States) Alexander Rossi	6

=== Team changes ===
- Addax Team left the championship as team principal Alejandro Agag concentrated his efforts on organising the inaugural FIA Formula E Championship. Their place was taken by Adrian Campos' eponymous team, Campos Racing, who returned to the championship after Campos originally sold the team to Agag in 2009 as he prepared his ill-fated attempt to join the Formula One grid.
- Hilmer Motorsport formed a partnership with Formula One team Force India to become Force India's junior team.
- Russian Time parted ways with Motopark Academy – who ran the team's cars in 2013 – following the death of team founder Igor Mazepa, and recruited members of iSport International to run the team.

=== Driver changes ===
==== Entering GP2 ====
- Super Formula driver Takuya Izawa made his GP2 Series debut with ART Grand Prix.
- Indy Lights driver Axcil Jefferies moved to the GP2 Series with Trident.
- Raffaele Marciello, the 2013 European Formula Three champion, entered the series with Racing Engineering.
- 2013 German Formula Three runner-up Artem Markelov joined GP2 with Russian Time.
- André Negrão entered GP2, racing for Arden International.
- Arthur Pic joined the series with Campos Racing.
- Facu Regalia, GP3 Series runner-up, graduated to the series with Hilmer Motorsport.
- 2013 Auto GP runner-up Kimiya Sato raced with the returning Campos Racing team.
- 2013 Formula Renault 3.5 Series runner-up Stoffel Vandoorne was placed at ART Grand Prix by Formula One team McLaren.

==== Changing teams ====
- Daniel Abt left ART Grand Prix to join Hilmer Motorsport.
- Nathanaël Berthon, who raced for Trident Racing moved to Venezuela GP Lazarus.
- René Binder switched from Venezuela GP Lazarus to Arden International.
- Johnny Cecotto Jr. left Arden International and returned to Trident Racing, the team he competed for in 2010.
- Stefano Coletti, who raced for Rapax moved to Racing Engineering.
- Conor Daly, who drove in the 2013 season opener for Hilmer Motorsport, switched to Venezuela GP Lazarus.
- Mitch Evans switched from Arden International to Russian Time, as the Motopark split forced Tom Dillmann out.
- Rio Haryanto moved from the departing Addax Team to join Caterham Racing, replacing Sergio Canamasas.
- Jon Lancaster switched from Hilmer Motorsport to MP Motorsport.
- Julián Leal moved from Racing Engineering to Carlin.
- Jolyon Palmer left Carlin to join DAMS.
- After having driven for MP Motorsport and Hilmer Motorsport in 2013, Adrian Quaife-Hobbs switched to Rapax in 2014.

==== Leaving GP2 ====
- Sam Bird left Russian Time and the GP2 Series to join the Starworks Motorsport team for the 2014 United SportsCar Championship season.
- James Calado left ART Grand Prix and the GP2 Series to join the FIA World Endurance Championship with AF Corse.
- Marcus Ericsson left DAMS and the series to join the Caterham F1 team.
- Robin Frijns left the series to concentrate on his reserve driver commitments to the Caterham F1 team.
- Fabio Leimer, who won the 2013 championship with Racing Engineering, left the series, as the reigning champion was not permitted to continue racing in the category. He joined the FIA World Endurance Championship with Rebellion Racing.

==== Mid-season changes ====
- Sergio Canamasas made his comeback to the series, replacing Axcil Jefferies at the Trident team for his home event in Barcelona.
- Tom Dillmann, who was set to remain at Russian Time until Motopark exited the team, returned to the series in Montmeló, replacing Arden's André Negrão, who had suffered a back injury.
- GP3 Series graduate Tio Ellinas, replaced Jon Lancaster at MP Motorsport, after the first round. He was replaced by Formula Renault 3.5 Series driver Marco Sørensen at the Silverstone round. Ellinas returned in Sochi to replace Adrian Quaife-Hobbs, after an injured neck ruled him out on medical advice. Kevin Giovesi, who competed in the previous season, replaced Ellinas for the final round, in Abu Dhabi.
- Jon Lancaster replaced Facu Regalia at Hilmer Motorsport at the Silverstone round.
- Alexander Rossi left the Caterham F1 and EQ8 Caterham Racing teams before the Hockenheimring round. He later joined Campos Racing as a substitute for Kimiya Sato, who raced in Auto GP that weekend, while his place at Caterham was taken by Tom Dillmann. Dillmann missed the Monza round of the championship, due to a conflicting round of the Porsche Carrera Cup France at Magny-Cours; his place was taken by Formula Renault 3.5 Series driver Pierre Gasly.
- Sergio Campana took over Conor Daly's seat at Venezuela GP Lazarus for the Monza and Sochi rounds. Daly returned for the final race in Abu Dhabi.
- Daniel Abt missed the series finale at Abu Dhabi due to his Formula E commitments; his seat at Hilmer Motorsport went to FIA European F3 Championship driver Nicholas Latifi.

== Calendar ==
After the final race of the 2013 season, series organisers announced that the 2014 championship would be contested at every European round of the Formula One World Championship. With the expansion of the Formula One calendar to include races in Russia and Austria, the GP2 Series held rounds at the Sochi Autodrom and the Red Bull Ring for the first time. The final calendar, consisting of eleven rounds, was revealed on 6 December 2013.

Round		Circuit/Location	Country	Date	Supporting
1	Feature	Bahrain International Circuit, Sakhir	Bahrain	5 April	Bahrain Grand Prix
1	Sprint	Bahrain International Circuit, Sakhir	Bahrain	6 April	Bahrain Grand Prix
2	Feature	Circuit de Barcelona-Catalunya, Montmeló	Spain	10 May	Spanish Grand Prix
2	Sprint	Circuit de Barcelona-Catalunya, Montmeló	Spain	11 May	Spanish Grand Prix
3	Feature	Circuit de Monaco, Monaco	Monaco	23 May	Monaco Grand Prix
3	Sprint	Circuit de Monaco, Monaco	Monaco	24 May	Monaco Grand Prix
4	Feature	Red Bull Ring, Spielberg	Austria	21 June	Austrian Grand Prix
4	Sprint	Red Bull Ring, Spielberg	Austria	22 June	Austrian Grand Prix
5	Feature	Silverstone Circuit, Silverstone	United Kingdom	5 July	British Grand Prix
5	Sprint	Silverstone Circuit, Silverstone	United Kingdom	6 July	British Grand Prix
6	Feature	Hockenheimring, Hockenheim	Germany	19 July	German Grand Prix
6	Sprint	Hockenheimring, Hockenheim	Germany	20 July	German Grand Prix
7	Feature	Hungaroring, Mogyoród	Hungary	26 July	Hungarian Grand Prix
7	Sprint	Hungaroring, Mogyoród	Hungary	27 July	Hungarian Grand Prix
8	Feature	Circuit de Spa-Francorchamps, Stavelot	Belgium	23 August	Belgian Grand Prix
8	Sprint	Circuit de Spa-Francorchamps, Stavelot	Belgium	24 August	Belgian Grand Prix
9	Feature	Autodromo Nazionale Monza, Monza	Italy	6 September	Italian Grand Prix
9	Sprint	Autodromo Nazionale Monza, Monza	Italy	7 September	Italian Grand Prix
10	Feature	Sochi Autodrom, Sochi	Russia	11 October	Russian Grand Prix
10	Sprint	Sochi Autodrom, Sochi	Russia	12 October	Russian Grand Prix
11	Feature	Yas Marina Circuit, Abu Dhabi	United Arab Emirates	22 November	Abu Dhabi Grand Prix
11	Sprint	Yas Marina Circuit, Abu Dhabi	United Arab Emirates	23 November	Abu Dhabi Grand Prix

=== Calendar changes ===
- The rounds in Sepang, Malaysia and Marina Bay, Singapore – on the GP2 series calendar in both 2012 and 2013 – were omitted for 2014.
- The GP2 series visited two venues – the Red Bull Ring in Austria and the Sochi Autodrom in Russia – for the first time during the 2014 season.

== Results ==
=== Summary ===
Round		Circuit	Pole position	Fastest lap	Winning driver	Winning team	Report
1	F	Bahrain International Circuit	(United Kingdom) Jolyon Palmer	(Russia) Artem Markelov (Note: Artem Markelov set the fastest lap, but did not finish in the top 10, so was ineligible to be the point-scorer for the fastest lap. Jolyon Palmer was the point-scorer instead for setting the fastest lap of those finishing in the top 10.)	(Belgium) Stoffel Vandoorne	(France) ART Grand Prix	Report
1	S	Bahrain International Circuit		(United States) Alexander Rossi (Note: Alexander Rossi set the fastest lap, but did not finish in the top 10, so was ineligible to be the point-scorer for the fastest lap. Jolyon Palmer was the point-scorer instead for setting the fastest lap of those finishing in the top 10.)	(United Kingdom) Jolyon Palmer	(France) DAMS	Report
2	F	(Spain) Circuit de Barcelona-Catalunya	(Monaco) Stéphane Richelmi	(New Zealand) Mitch Evans (Note: Mitch Evans set the fastest lap, but did not finish in the top 10, so was ineligible to be the point-scorer for the fastest lap. Julián Leal was the point-scorer instead for setting the fastest lap of those finishing in the top 10.)	(Venezuela) Johnny Cecotto Jr.	(Italy) Trident	Report
2	S	(Spain) Circuit de Barcelona-Catalunya		(Netherlands) Daniël de Jong (Note: Daniël de Jong set the fastest lap, but did not finish in the top 10, so was ineligible to be the point-scorer for the fastest lap. Jolyon Palmer was the point-scorer instead for setting the fastest lap of those finishing in the top 10.)	(Brazil) Felipe Nasr	(United Kingdom) Carlin	Report
3	F	Circuit de Monaco	(United Kingdom) Jolyon Palmer	(United Kingdom) Jolyon Palmer	(United Kingdom) Jolyon Palmer	(France) DAMS	Report
3	S	Circuit de Monaco		(Cyprus) Tio Ellinas (Note: Tio Ellinas set the fastest lap, but did not finish in the top 10, so was ineligible to be the point-scorer for the fastest lap. Stefano Coletti was the point-scorer instead for setting the fastest lap of those finishing in the top 10.)	(Monaco) Stéphane Richelmi	(France) DAMS	Report
4	F	(Austria) Red Bull Ring	(Venezuela) Johnny Cecotto Jr.	(Brazil) Felipe Nasr	(Brazil) Felipe Nasr	(United Kingdom) Carlin	Report
4	S	(Austria) Red Bull Ring		(Monaco) Stefano Coletti	(Venezuela) Johnny Cecotto Jr.	(Italy) Trident	Report
5	F	(United Kingdom) Silverstone Circuit	(Italy) Raffaele Marciello	(New Zealand) Mitch Evans	(New Zealand) Mitch Evans	(Russia) RT Russian Time	Report
5	S	(United Kingdom) Silverstone Circuit		(Monaco) Stefano Coletti	(Brazil) Felipe Nasr	(United Kingdom) Carlin	Report
6	F	(Germany) Hockenheimring	(United Kingdom) Jolyon Palmer	(United Kingdom) Jolyon Palmer	(New Zealand) Mitch Evans	(Russia) RT Russian Time	Report
6	S	(Germany) Hockenheimring		(Monaco) Stefano Coletti	(Monaco) Stefano Coletti	(Spain) Racing Engineering	Report
7	F	(Hungary) Hungaroring	(Brazil) Felipe Nasr	(New Zealand) Mitch Evans (Note: Mitch Evans set the fastest lap, but did not finish in the top 10, so was ineligible to be the point-scorer for the fastest lap. Tom Dillmann was the point-scorer instead for setting the fastest lap of those finishing in the top 10.)	(France) Arthur Pic	(Spain) Campos Racing	Report
7	S	(Hungary) Hungaroring		(Belgium) Stoffel Vandoorne	(Belgium) Stoffel Vandoorne	(France) ART Grand Prix	Report
8	F	(Belgium) Circuit de Spa-Francorchamps	(Belgium) Stoffel Vandoorne	(Italy) Raffaele Marciello	(Italy) Raffaele Marciello	(Spain) Racing Engineering	Report
8	S	(Belgium) Circuit de Spa-Francorchamps		(United Kingdom) Adrian Quaife-Hobbs (Note: Adrian Quaife-Hobbs set the fastest lap, but did not finish in the top 10, so was ineligible to be the point-scorer for the fastest lap. Felipe Nasr was the point-scorer instead for setting the fastest lap of those finishing in the top 10.)	(Brazil) Felipe Nasr	(United Kingdom) Carlin	Report
9	F	(Italy) Autodromo Nazionale Monza	(Belgium) Stoffel Vandoorne	(Colombia) Julián Leal (Note: Julián Leal set the fastest lap, but did not finish in the top 10, so was ineligible to be the point-scorer for the fastest lap. Jolyon Palmer was the point-scorer instead for setting the fastest lap of those finishing in the top 10.)	(Belgium) Stoffel Vandoorne	(France) ART Grand Prix	Report
9	S	(Italy) Autodromo Nazionale Monza		(Monaco) Stefano Coletti	(United Kingdom) Jolyon Palmer	(France) DAMS	Report
10	F	(Russia) Sochi Autodrom	(Belgium) Stoffel Vandoorne (Note: Vandoorne and Arthur Pic set identical lap times, but Vandoorne was the pole-sitter as he set it first.)	(Belgium) Stoffel Vandoorne	(United Kingdom) Jolyon Palmer	(France) DAMS	Report
10	S	(Russia) Sochi Autodrom		(France) Arthur Pic	(Denmark) Marco Sørensen	(Netherlands) MP Motorsport	Report
11	F	(United Arab Emirates) Yas Marina Circuit	(Belgium) Stoffel Vandoorne	(United Kingdom) Jolyon Palmer	(Belgium) Stoffel Vandoorne	(France) ART Grand Prix	Report
11	S	(United Arab Emirates) Yas Marina Circuit		(Belgium) Stoffel Vandoorne	(Monaco) Stefano Coletti	(Spain) Racing Engineering	Report

== Championship standings ==
Scoring system

Points were awarded to the top 10 classified finishers in the Feature race, and to the top 8 classified finishers in the Sprint race. The pole-sitter in the feature race also received four points, and two points were given to the driver who set the fastest lap inside the top ten in both the feature and sprint races. No extra points were awarded to the pole-sitter in the sprint race.

Feature race points

Position	**1st**	**2nd**	**3rd**	**4th**	**5th**	**6th**	**7th**	**8th**	**9th**	**10th**	**Pole**	**FL**
Points	25	18	15	12	10	8	6	4	2	1	4	2

Sprint race points

Points were awarded to the top 8 classified finishers.

Position	**1st**	**2nd**	**3rd**	**4th**	**5th**	**6th**	**7th**	**8th**	**FL**
Points	15	12	10	8	6	4	2	1	2

=== Drivers' championship ===
Pos.	Driver	BHR (Bahrain)		CAT (Spain)		MON (Monaco)		RBR (Austria)		SIL (United Kingdom)		HOC (Germany)		HUN (Hungary)		SPA (Belgium)		MNZ (Italy)		SOC (Russia)		YMC (United Arab Emirates)		Points
1	(United Kingdom) Jolyon Palmer	**3**	1	2	2	**1**	7	5	6	2	4	**3**	6	4	2	6	3	8	1	1	10	2	Ret	276
2	(Belgium) Stoffel Vandoorne	1	22	13	10	14	13	2	15	3	9	2	3	7	1	**2**	6	**1**	13	**5**	2	**1**	5	229
3	(Brazil) Felipe Nasr	8	4	3	1	3	Ret	1	Ret	7	1	5	2	**6**	3	4	1	6	6	17	3	4	2	224
4	(New Zealand) Mitch Evans	14	7	14	20†	2	6	7	4	1	7	1	11	12	9	5	4	3	20†	2	4	3	4	174
5	(Venezuela) Johnny Cecotto Jr.	21	14	1	6	4	4	**6**	1	6	3	7	Ret	Ret	Ret	3	2	10	Ret	19	23†	6	6	140
6	(Monaco) Stefano Coletti	4	23	16	8	Ret	9	4	2	4	2	4	1	18	Ret	Ret	7	9	2	Ret	8	7	1	136
7	(France) Arthur Pic	5	9	6	4	6	5	10	13	11	22†	19	Ret	1	6	15	20	2	7	4	5	8	3	124
8	(Italy) Raffaele Marciello	18	24	Ret	16	12	19	3	3	**Ret**	Ret	17	Ret	19	8	1	14	Ret	18	3	Ret	11	7	74
9	(Monaco) Stéphane Richelmi	19	5	**10**	7	8	1	14	10	8	6	10	Ret	Ret	11	21	12	4	3	22	18	5	9	73
10	(Colombia) Julián Leal	2	3	4	5	Ret	16	13	7	5	5	16	18	Ret	15	13	10	13	17	9	17	12	11	68
11	(Denmark) Marco Sørensen									9	8	9	4	10	10	14	11	7	4	8	1	Ret	21	47
12	(Brazil) André Negrão	20	18			Ret	15	16	14	20	16	18	21	15	Ret	9	8	5	5	6	6	Ret	24	31
13	(United Kingdom) Adrian Quaife-Hobbs	10	6	9	9	9	8	24	18	13	15	14	8	2	12	11	21	14	8					30
14	(Spain) Sergio Canamasas			17	18	5	2	15	9	15	Ret	15	13	Ret	DNS	20	Ret	18	DSQ	7	Ret	16	8	29
15	(Indonesia) Rio Haryanto	16	16	5	Ret	7	3	11	17	21	Ret	22†	10	Ret	17	Ret	16	16	16	18	15	9	12	28
16	(Germany) Daniel Abt	13	13	Ret	12	Ret	17	17	23	10	11	20	15	5	5	8	5	Ret	10	Ret	13			27
17	(Switzerland) Simon Trummer	7	2	12	Ret	Ret	18	20	20	25	18	6	14	11	13	18	17	19	11	15	21	17	16	26
18	(Japan) Takuya Izawa	6	12	20	13	Ret	Ret	9	8	16	23†	13	19	3	21†	16	22	Ret	14	20	22	13	10	26
19	(France) Tom Dillmann			8	3							12	9	9	19†	12	9							18
20	(France) Nathanaël Berthon	23†	17	Ret	Ret	17	12	22	25	17	12	8	17	8	4	22	15	12	19†	10	9	15	13	17
21	(United States) Alexander Rossi	22	25	Ret	14	16	11	8	5	12	21	Ret	7											12
22	(Cyprus) Tio Ellinas			7	11	10	22	23	22											21	14			7
23	(United Kingdom) Jon Lancaster	17	15							22	13	Ret	5	17	16	19	Ret	11	15	12	16	18	14	6
24	(Russia) Artem Markelov	15	10	11	Ret	Ret	Ret	21	16	18	17	Ret	12	16	20†	7	Ret	21	Ret	16	12	Ret	19	6
25	(Austria) René Binder	9	8	15	Ret	Ret	20	12	12	24	19	11	22	20	14	Ret	23	20	Ret	23	Ret	Ret	23	3
26	(United States) Conor Daly	12	Ret	18	Ret	13	10	18	11	14	10	21	20	13	7	Ret	19					20	15	2
27	(Japan) Kimiya Sato	Ret	19	19	15	15	14	Ret	19	23	20			Ret	Ret	17	18	Ret	12	13	7	14	22	2
28	(Netherlands) Daniël de Jong	11	11	Ret	19	11	Ret	19	21	19	14	Ret	16	14	18	10	13	Ret	9	14	19	10	Ret	2
29	(France) Pierre Gasly																	17	Ret	11	11	21	18	0
30	(Italy) Sergio Campana																	15	Ret	DNS	20			0
31	(Argentina) Facu Regalia	Ret	20	Ret	17	Ret	21	Ret	24															0
32	(Canada) Nicholas Latifi																					22	17	0
33	(Italy) Kevin Giovesi																					19	20	0
34	(Zimbabwe) Axcil Jefferies	Ret	21																					0
Pos.	Driver	BHR (Bahrain)		CAT (Spain)		MON (Monaco)		RBR (Austria)		SIL (United Kingdom)		HOC (Germany)		HUN (Hungary)		SPA (Belgium)		MNZ (Italy)		SOC (Russia)		YMC (United Arab Emirates)		Points

Key
Colour	Result
Gold	Winner
Silver	2nd place
Bronze	3rd place
Green	Other points position
Blue	Other classified position
Blue	Not classified, finished (NC)
Purple	Not classified, retired (Ret)
Red	Did not qualify (DNQ)
Red	Did not pre-qualify (DNPQ)
Black	Disqualified (DSQ)
White	Did not start (DNS)
White	Race cancelled (C)
Blank	Did not practice (DNP)
Blank	Excluded (EX)
Blank	Did not arrive (DNA)
Blank	Withdrawn (WD)
Text formatting	Meaning
**Bold**	Pole position point(s)
Italics	Fastest lap point(s)

Notes:

- † — Drivers did not finish the race, but were classified as they completed over 90% of the race distance.

=== Teams' championship ===
Pos.	Team	No.	BHR (Bahrain)		CAT (Spain)		MON (Monaco)		RBR (Austria)		SIL (United Kingdom)		HOC (Germany)		HUN (Hungary)		SPA (Belgium)		MNZ (Italy)		SOC (Russia)		YMC (United Arab Emirates)		Points
1	(France) DAMS	7	**3**	1	2	2	**1**	7	5	6	2	4	**3**	6	4	2	6	3	8	1	1	10	2	Ret	349
1	(France) DAMS	8	19	5	**10**	7	8	1	14	10	8	6	10	Ret	Ret	11	21	12	4	3	22	18	5	9	349
2	(United Kingdom) Carlin	3	8	4	3	1	3	Ret	1	Ret	7	1	5	2	**6**	3	4	1	6	6	17	3	4	2	292
2	(United Kingdom) Carlin	4	2	3	4	5	Ret	16	13	7	5	5	16	18	Ret	15	13	10	13	17	9	17	12	11	292
3	(France) ART Grand Prix	9	6	12	20	13	Ret	Ret	9	8	16	23†	13	19	3	21†	16	22	Ret	14	20	22	13	10	255
3	(France) ART Grand Prix	10	1	22	13	10	14	13	2	15	3	9	2	3	7	1	**2**	6	**1**	13	**5**	2	**1**	5	255
4	(Spain) Racing Engineering	5	18	24	Ret	16	12	19	3	3	**Ret**	Ret	17	Ret	19	8	1	14	Ret	18	3	Ret	11	7	210
4	(Spain) Racing Engineering	6	4	23	16	8	Ret	9	4	2	4	2	4	1	18	Ret	Ret	7	9	2	Ret	8	7	1	210
5	(Russia) RT Russian Time	1	14	7	14	20†	2	6	7	4	1	7	1	11	12	9	5	4	3	20†	2	4	3	4	180
5	(Russia) RT Russian Time	2	15	10	11	Ret	Ret	Ret	21	16	18	17	Ret	12	16	20†	7	Ret	21	Ret	16	12	Ret	19	180
6	(Italy) Trident	22	Ret	21	17	18	5	2	15	9	15	Ret	15	13	Ret	DNS	20	Ret	18	DSQ	7	Ret	16	8	169
6	(Italy) Trident	23	21	14	1	6	4	4	**6**	1	6	3	7	Ret	Ret	Ret	3	2	10	Ret	19	23†	6	6	169
7	(Spain) Campos Racing	26	5	9	6	4	6	5	10	13	11	22†	19	Ret	1	6	15	20	2	7	4	5	8	3	128
7	(Spain) Campos Racing	27	Ret	19	19	15	15	14	Ret	19	23	20	Ret	7	Ret	Ret	17	18	Ret	12	13	7	14	22	128
8	(Netherlands) MP Motorsport	20	11	11	Ret	19	11	Ret	19	21	19	14	Ret	16	14	18	10	13	Ret	9	14	19	10	Ret	56
8	(Netherlands) MP Motorsport	21	17	15	7	11	10	22	23	22	9	8	9	4	10	10	14	11	7	4	8	1	Ret	21	56
9	(Italy) Rapax	14	10	6	9	9	9	8	24	18	13	15	14	8	2	12	11	21	14	8	21	14	19	20	56
9	(Italy) Rapax	15	7	2	12	Ret	Ret	18	20	20	25	18	6	14	11	13	18	17	19	11	15	21	17	16	56
10	(United Kingdom) Arden International	16	9	8	15	Ret	Ret	20	12	12	24	19	11	22	20	14	Ret	23	20	Ret	23	Ret	Ret	23	48
10	(United Kingdom) Arden International	17	20	18	8	3	Ret	15	16	14	20	16	18	21	15	Ret	9	8	5	5	6	6	Ret	24	48
11	(Malaysia) EQ8 Caterham Racing (1–8) (Malaysia) Caterham Racing (9–11)	18	16	16	5	Ret	7	3	11	17	21	Ret	22†	10	Ret	17	Ret	16	16	16	18	15	9	12	42
11	(Malaysia) EQ8 Caterham Racing (1–8) (Malaysia) Caterham Racing (9–11)	19	22	25	Ret	14	16	11	8	5	12	22	12	9	9	19†	12	9	17	Ret	11	11	21	18	42
12	(Germany) Hilmer Motorsport	11	13	13	Ret	12	Ret	17	17	23	10	11	20	15	5	5	8	5	Ret	10	Ret	13	22	17	33
12	(Germany) Hilmer Motorsport	12	Ret	20	Ret	17	Ret	21	Ret	24	22	13	Ret	5	17	16	19	Ret	11	15	12	16	18	14	33
13	(Italy) Venezuela GP Lazarus	24	23†	17	Ret	Ret	17	12	22	25	17	12	8	17	8	4	22	15	12	19†	10	9	15	13	19
13	(Italy) Venezuela GP Lazarus	25	12	Ret	18	Ret	13	10	18	11	14	10	21	20	13	7	Ret	19	15	Ret	DNS	20	20	15	19
Pos.	Team	No.	BHR (Bahrain)		CAT (Spain)		MON (Monaco)		RBR (Austria)		SIL (United Kingdom)		HOC (Germany)		HUN (Hungary)		SPA (Belgium)		MNZ (Italy)		SOC (Russia)		YMC (United Arab Emirates)		Points

Key
Colour	Result
Gold	Winner
Silver	2nd place
Bronze	3rd place
Green	Other points position
Blue	Other classified position
Blue	Not classified, finished (NC)
Purple	Not classified, retired (Ret)
Red	Did not qualify (DNQ)
Red	Did not pre-qualify (DNPQ)
Black	Disqualified (DSQ)
White	Did not start (DNS)
White	Race cancelled (C)
Blank	Did not practice (DNP)
Blank	Excluded (EX)
Blank	Did not arrive (DNA)
Blank	Withdrawn (WD)
Text formatting	Meaning
**Bold**	Pole position point(s)
Italics	Fastest lap point(s)

Notes:

- † — Drivers did not finish the race, but were classified as they completed over 90% of the race distance.
