= Howard Fuller (racing driver) =

British racing driver (born 1992)

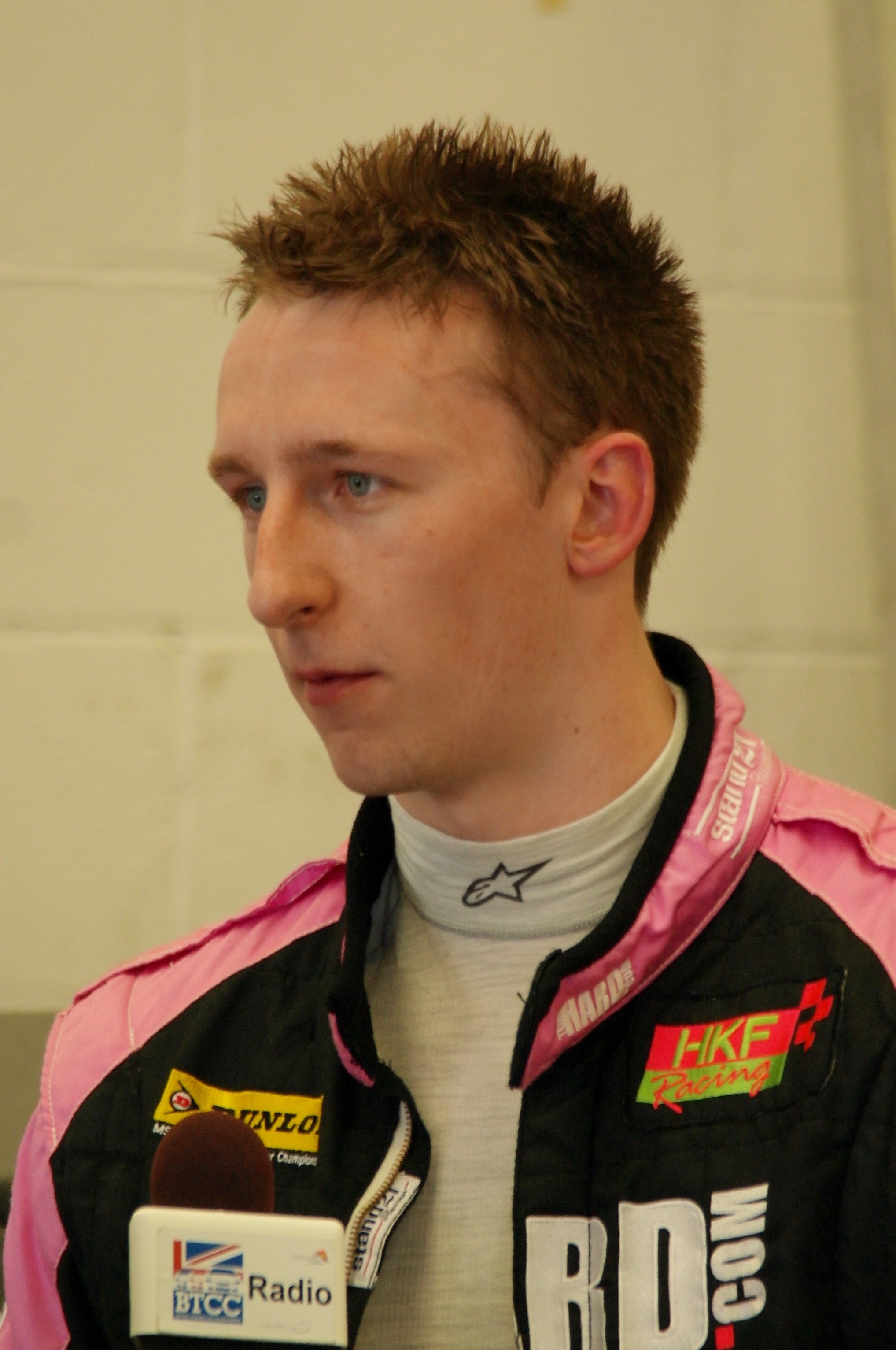
- Fuller at the Silverstone round of the 2013 British Touring Car Championship season.
- Nationality: British
- Born: 31 July 1992 (age 34) Worcester Park, England

British Touring Car Championship career
- Debut season: 2012
- Current team: RCIB Insurance Racing
- Car number: 65
- Starts: 12
- Wins: 0
- Poles: 0
- Fastest laps: 0
- Best finish: 24th in 2012

Previous series
- 2011 2010, 2012 2009–2010: Formula Renault BARC; VW Racing Cup; Formula Palmer Audi

Howard K. Fuller (born 31 July 1992 in Worcester Park, Surrey) is a British racing driver. He currently drives in the British Touring Car Championship for RCIB Insurance Racing.

== Racing career ==
=== Early career ===
Fuller started out his racing career in kart racing, with his key result being a win at the Winter Festival at Sandown Park, which is run by Daytona Motorsport, in 2002.

=== Volkswagen Racing Cup ===
Fuller first entered the Volkswagen Racing Cup in 2010 at Rockingham, winning in his second race in the category by a four–second margin. He went on to race in the following round of the championship at Silverstone where he retired with gearbox problems.

=== British Touring Car Championship ===
==== Team HARD. (2012–2017) ====
Fuller joined the British Touring Car Championship grid for the Rockingham round of the 2012 season, replacing Robb Holland in the Team HARD. Honda Civic. He finished 14th in his first race, bettering this with a 12th place finish in the wet conditions of race two. He finished race one and two at Silverstone two weeks later 11th. Aaron Williamson took over the car for the final event of the season at Brands Hatch, meaning Fuller finished the season 24th in the drivers' championship.

Fuller originally planned to stay in the BTCC for the 2013 season, driving a Team HARD. Volkswagen CC. Although entered for the full season, he did not make his first race appearance until Rockingham where he drove a Vauxhall Insignia.

Fuller was due to return to the BTCC in 2020, again with Team HARD but this time in the team's Volkswagen CC, as a replacement for Mike Bushell. However, the start of the season was delayed until August due to the outbreak of COVID-19, by which time he was replaced by Ollie Brown.

=== TCR UK ===
==== SWR Racing (2018-) ====
Fuller joined Sean Walkinshaw Racing (SWR) in 2018 to pilot their Honda Civic Type R in the inaugural TCR UK series (www.tcruk.co.uk). Fuller qualified third at Silverstone and finished in fourth and fifth places in the two races that weekend.

== Racing record ==
=== Complete British Touring Car Championship results ===
(key) (Races in bold indicate pole position – 1 point awarded in first race) (Races in italics indicate fastest lap – 1 point awarded all races) (* signifies that driver lead race for at least one lap – 1 point given)

Year	Team	Car	1	2	3	4	5	6	7	8	9	10	11	12	13	14	15	16	17	18	19	20	21	22	23	24	25	26	27	28	29	30	DC	Points
2012	Team HARD.	Honda Civic	BRH; 1	BRH; 2	BRH; 3	DON; 1	DON; 2	DON; 3	THR; 1	THR; 2	THR; 3	OUL; 1	OUL; 2	OUL; 3	CRO; 1	CRO; 2	CRO; 3	SNE; 1	SNE; 2	SNE; 3	KNO; 1	KNO; 2	KNO; 3	ROC; 1; 14	ROC; 2; 12	ROC; 3; 16	SIL; 1; 11	SIL; 2 NC	SIL; 3; 11	BRH; 1	BRH; 2	BRH; 3	24th	16
2013	RCIB Insurance Racing	Vauxhall Insignia	BRH; 1	BRH; 2	BRH; 3	DON; 1	DON; 2	DON; 3	THR; 1	THR; 2	THR; 3	OUL; 1	OUL; 2	OUL; 3	CRO; 1	CRO; 2	CRO; 3	SNE; 1	SNE; 2	SNE; 3	KNO; 1	KNO; 2	KNO; 3	ROC; 1; 17	ROC; 2; 17	ROC; 3 Ret	SIL; 1; 17	SIL; 2; 11	SIL; 3; 15	BRH; 1	BRH; 2	BRH; 3	26th	6
