= Max Snegirev =

Russian racing driver (born 1987)

- Nationality: British
- Born: Max Snegirev; 12 June 1987 (age 39)

Auto GP career
- Debut season: 2012
- Current team: Virtuosi UK
- Car number: 6
- Former teams: Campos Racing
- Starts: 30
- Wins: 0
- Poles: 0
- Fastest laps: 0
- Best finish: 13th in 2012 & 2013

Previous series
- 2011 2010–11 2007–10 2009 2009 2008 2007: FIA Formula Two Championship; British F3; Formula Palmer Audi; British F3 National Class; Formula Renault 2.0 UK; FR2.0 UK Winter Series; FPA Autumn Trophy

Max Snegirev; born 12 June 1987 is a former racing driver.

== Career ==
=== Formula Palmer Audi ===
Unlike most racing drivers, Snegirev had no karting experience and made his racing debut in Formula Palmer Audi in 2007. He finished nineteenth with fourteen point-scoring finishes and six retirements. Snegirev remained in the series for 2008, improving to eleventh place in the championship and was running at the finish of each race. His best result was sixth place at Donington.

In 2009, Snegirev returned to the series, participating in the final round at Snetterton, scoring five points in his only race, failing to start in another two races. Snegirev made another return to the series in 2010, contesting the last two weekends of the season at Croft and Silverstone. He won a race at Croft and took two podiums at Silverstone.

=== Formula Renault ===
Snegirev took part in the Rockingham races of the 2008 Formula Renault 2.0 UK Winter Cup with Falcon Motorsport. He also competed in two races of the main series in 2009 with Tempus Sport.

=== Formula Three ===
Snegirev made his debut in the National Class of the British Formula 3 Championship in 2009 with Team West-Tec. In a slim field, he finished fourth in the championship despite missing two rounds at Hockenheim and Spa.

Snegirev remained in the series in 2010, but switched to the Championship Class and Fortec Motorsport. Despite his Formula Two involvement Snegirev returned to the series in 2011, competing at Brands Hatch, Donington Park and Silverstone.

=== Formula Two ===
In 2011, Snegirev made his Formula Two debut. He had three point-scoring finishes in sixteen races, and finished eighteenth in the championship. After missing the first round of the 2012 season at Silverstone due to Auto GP commitments, he returned to the series for the remainder of the season.

=== Auto GP ===
Snegirev stepped up to the Auto GP World Series in 2012, joining Campos Racing.

=== Current career ===
Snegirev has worked as a recruitment consultant in the automotive and motorsport industry since 2015.

== Racing record ==
=== Career summary ===
Season	Series	Team name	Races	Wins	Poles	F/Laps	Podiums	Points	Position
2007	Formula Palmer Audi	Audi Russia Motorsport	20	0	0	0	0	74	19th
2007	Formula Palmer Audi Autumn Trophy	Audi Russia Motorsport	6	0	0	0	0	41	12th
2008	Formula Palmer Audi	Audi Russia Motorsport	20	0	0	0	0	137	11th
2008	Formula Palmer Audi Autumn Trophy	Audi Russia Motorsport	6	0	0	0	0	42	10th
2008	Formula Renault UK Winter Series	Falcon Motorsport	2	0	0	0	0	10	22nd
2009	British Formula 3 International Series - National	Team West-Tec	16	0	0	0	4	108	4th
2009	Formula Renault UK	Tempus Sport	2	0	0	0	0	0	32nd
2009	Formula Palmer Audi	Audi Russia Motorsport	1	0	0	0	0	5	33rd
2010	British Formula 3 International Series	Fortec Motorsport	30	0	0	0	0	1	18th
2010	Formula Palmer Audi	MotorSport Vision	7	1	0	0	3	104	13th
2011	FIA Formula Two Championship	MotorSport Vision	16	0	0	0	0	14	18th
2011	British Formula 3 International Series	Hitech Racing	9	0	0	0	0	2	24th
2012	Auto GP World Series	Campos Racing	14	0	0	0	0	34	13th
2012	FIA Formula Two Championship	MotorSport Vision	12	0	0	0	0	6	15th
2013	Auto GP	Virtuosi UK	16	0	0	0	0	24	13th

=== Complete FIA Formula Two Championship results ===
(key) (Races in bold indicate pole position) (Races in italics indicate fastest lap)

Year	1	2	3	4	5	6	7	8	9	10	11	12	13	14	15	16	Pos	Points
2011	SIL; 1; 9	SIL; 2 Ret	MAG; 1; 16	MAG; 2; 14	SPA; 1; 14	SPA; 2; 13	NÜR; 1; 11	NÜR; 2; 18	BRH; 1; 7	BRH; 2 Ret	SPL; 1; 11	SPL; 2; 7	MNZ; 1; 16	MNZ; 2 Ret	CAT; 1; 12	CAT; 2; 12	18th	14
2012	SIL; 1	SIL; 2	ALG; 1; 17	ALG; 2; 15	NÜR; 1 Ret	NÜR; 2; 14	SPA; 1 Ret	SPA; 2; 16	BRH; 1 Ret	BRH; 2; 14	LEC; 1	LEC; 2	HUN; 1; 7	HUN; 2; 15	MNZ; 1; 14	MNZ; 2; 12	15th	6

=== Complete Auto GP results ===
(key) (Races in bold indicate pole position) (Races in italics indicate fastest lap)

Year	Entrant	1	2	3	4	5	6	7	8	9	10	11	12	13	14	15	16	Pos	Points
2012	Campos Racing	MNZ; 1; 7	MNZ; 2; 6	VAL; 1; 8	VAL; 2; 6	MAR; 1; 13	MAR; 2 Ret	HUN; 1 Ret	HUN; 2; 11	ALG; 1; 12	ALG; 2; 8	CUR; 1; 10†	CUR; 2; 7	SON; 1 Ret	SON; 2; 7			13th	34
2013	Virtuosi UK	MNZ; 1; 10	MNZ; 2 Ret	MAR; 1; 13	MAR; 2; 5	HUN; 1; 10	HUN; 2; 8	SIL; 1; 11	SIL; 2; 6	MUG; 1; 9	MUG; 2; 11	NÜR; 1; 11	NÜR; 2; 13	DON; 1; 12	DON; 2; 10	BRN; 1; 10	BRN; 2; 10	13th	24
