= Giuseppe Cipriani (racing driver) =

Italian racing driver

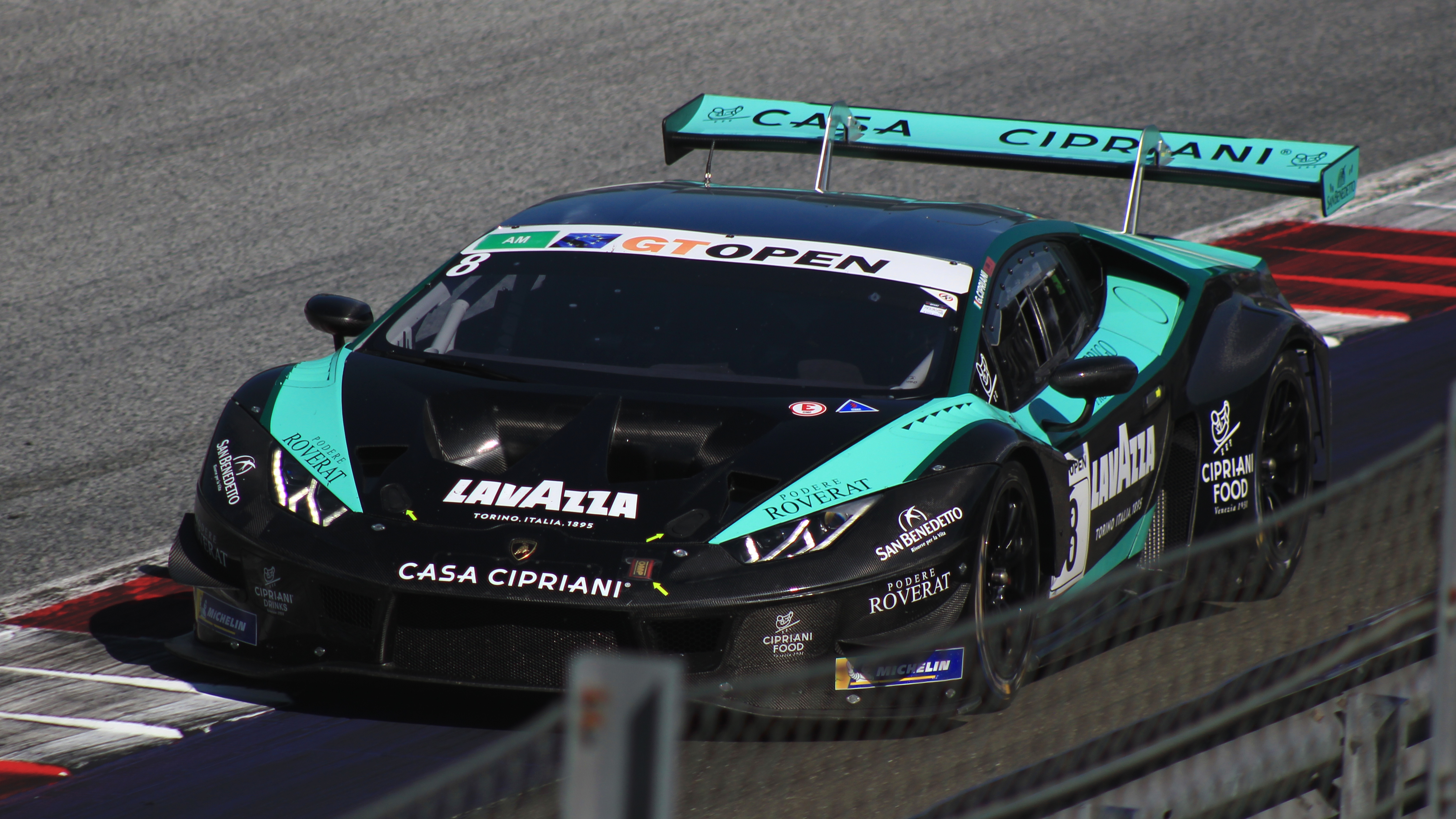
- Cipriani at the Red Bull Ring in 2023
- Nationality: Italian
- Born: 9 June 1965 (age 61) Venice, Italy

Auto GP career
- Debut season: 2010
- Current team: Ibiza Racing Team
- Categorisation: FIA Bronze
- Car number: 7
- Former teams: Durango, Campos Racing
- Starts: 54
- Wins: 0
- Poles: 0
- Fastest laps: 0
- Best finish: 11th in 2014

Previous series
- 2008-09 1989-90: Formula Palmer Audi; Italian Formula Three

Giuseppe Cipriani (born 9 June 1965) is an Italian racing driver and businessman.

== Biography ==
Cipriani is the grandson of Giuseppe Cipriani, founder of hotel and restaurant chain Cipriani S.A. which includes Harry's Bar. Cipriani today is managing director of the company founded by his grandfather.

Cipriani began his involvement in motorsport in the United States in the late-1980s, competing in the Barber Pro Series. He returned to Italy to compete in domestic Formula 3 in 1990, before moving into team management the following year having founded International Formula 3000 team Il Barone Rampante. Cipriani attempted to buy Tyrrell Racing and enter Formula One in 1992 with IBR, with plans to compete as Benetton's B-team, but was not successful and left motorsport at the end of 1993 in favour of other business interests. Cipriani returned to driving in the late-2000s, which saw him initially compete in open-wheel series including Formula Palmer Audi, Auto GP and Formula V8 3.5 before switching to GT racing in 2018.

== Racing record ==
=== Complete Formula Palmer Audi results ===
(key) (Races in bold indicate pole position) (Races in italics indicate fastest lap)

Year	1	2	3	4	5	6	7	8	9	10	11	12	13	14	15	16	17	18	19	20	Pos	Points
2008	DON; 1	DON; 2	DON; 3	BRH; 1	BRH; 2	SPA; 1	SPA; 2	SPA; 3	OUL; 1	OUL; 2	BRH; 1	BRH; 2	SNE; 1	SNE; 2	SNE; 3	BRH; 1	BRH; 2	BRH; 3	SIL; 1; 14	SIL; 2; 20	31st	6
2009	BRH; 1 Ret	BRH; 2; 20	BRH; 3; 19	SIL; 1 Ret	SIL; 2; 15	SIL; 3; 14	SNE; 1; 14	SNE; 2; 16	OUL; 1; 9	OUL; 2; 9	OUL; 3 Ret	BRH; 1; 12	BRH; 2; 15	BRH; 3 Ret	SIL; 1; 14	SIL; 2; 17	SIL; 3; 15	SNE; 1; 16	SNE; 2; 12	SNE; 3; 11	14th	92
2010	BRH; 1 Ret	BRH; 2; 16	BRH; 3 Ret	SNE; 1; 11	SNE; 2; 9	SNE; 3; 6	SNE; 4; 11	OUL; 1; 9	OUL; 2; 7	ROC; 1; 14	ROC; 2; 9	BRH; 1; 12	BRH; 2; 12	CRO; 1	CRO; 2	CRO; 3	SIL; 1; 9	SIL; 2; 7	SIL; 3; 8	SIL; 4; 11	11th	149

=== Complete Auto GP results ===
(key) (Races in bold indicate pole position) (Races in italics indicate fastest lap)

Year	Entrant	1	2	3	4	5	6	7	8	9	10	11	12	13	14	15	16	Pos	Points
2010	Durango	BRN; 1	BRN; 2	IMO; 1	IMO; 2	SPA; 1	SPA; 2	MAG; 1	MAG; 2	NAV; 1	NAV; 2	MNZ; 1; 16	MNZ; 2; 13					26th	0
2011	Griffitz Durango	MNZ; 1 Ret	MNZ; 2; 14	HUN; 1; 15	HUN; 2; 13	BRN; 1; 9	BRN; 2; 12	DON; 1; 12	DON; 2 Ret	OSC; 1 Ret	OSC; 2; 13†	VAL; 1; 15	VAL; 2; 12	MUG; 1; 13†	MUG; 2 Ret			20th	2
2012	Campos Racing	MNZ; 1; 11	MNZ; 2; 10	VAL; 1; 12	VAL; 2; 14	MAR; 1 Ret	MAR; 2; 9	HUN; 1; 6	HUN; 2; 6	ALG; 1 Ret	ALG; 2 Ret	CUR; 1 Ret	CUR; 2; 10	SON; 1 Ret	SON; 2 Ret			14th	18
2013	Ibiza Racing Team	MNZ; 1; 9	MNZ; 2; 13	MAR; 1; 10	MAR; 2 Ret	HUN; 1; 13	HUN; 2 Ret	SIL; 1	SIL; 2	MUG; 1	MUG; 2	NÜR; 1	NÜR; 2	DON; 1	DON; 2	BRN; 1	BRN; 2	21st	3
2014	Ibiza Racing	MAR; 1; 3	MAR; 2; 7	LEC; 1; 10	LEC; 2; 10	HUN; 1; 12†	HUN; 2 Ret	MNZ; 1; 7	MNZ; 2; 8	IMO; 1; 8	IMO; 2 Ret	RBR; 1; 9	RBR; 2 Ret	NÜR; 1 Ret	NÜR; 2; 9	EST; 1	EST; 2	11th	38
2015	Ibiza Racing Team	HUN; 1 Ret	HUN; 2; 7	SIL; 1; 5	SIL; 2; 4													7th‡	24‡

^{‡} Position when season was cancelled.

=== Complete World Series Formula V8 3.5 results ===
(key) (Races in bold indicate pole position) (Races in italics indicate fastest lap)

Year	Team	1	2	3	4	5	6	7	8	9	10	11	12	13	14	15	16	17	18	Pos.	Points
2016	Durango Racing Team	ALC; 1; 13	ALC; 2; 13	HUN; 1 Ret	HUN; 2 Ret	SPA; 1; 9	SPA; 2; 8	LEC; 1; 13	LEC; 2; 13	SIL; 1; 11	SIL; 2; 12	RBR; 1; 13	RBR; 2 Ret	MNZ; 1; 13	MNZ; 2; 11	JER; 1 Ret	JER; 2; 15	CAT; 1; 12	CAT; 2; 14	17th	6
2017	Il Barone Rampante	SIL; 1; 11	SIL; 2; 9	SPA; 1 Ret	SPA; 2; 12	MNZ; 1; 10	MNZ; 2; 8	JER; 1; 10	JER; 2 Ret	ALC; 1; 10	ALC; 2; 10	NÜR; 1; 12	NÜR; 2 Ret	MEX; 1; 10	MEX; 2; 6	COA; 1 Ret	COA; 2; 9†	BHR; 1	BHR; 2	15th	21

^{†} Driver did not finish, but was classified as he completed over 90% of the race distance.

Sporting positions
Preceded by Giulio Borlenghi; Andrzej Lewandowski	International GT Open; Am Champion; 2019	Succeeded by Incumbent
