= Richard Plant (racing driver) =

British racing driver

- Nationality: (United Kingdom) British
- Born: 16 November 1989 (age 36) Sheffield (United Kingdom)

Porsche Carrera Cup Great Britain career
- Debut season: 2011
- Current team: Team Parker Racing
- Car number: 5
- Starts: 33
- Wins: 1
- Poles: 0
- Fastest laps: 1
- Best finish: 5th in 2011

Championship titles
- 2009: Formula Palmer Audi

Richard Plant (born 16 November 1989 in Sheffield, South Yorkshire) is a British racing driver. Plant was Formula Palmer Audi champion in 2009. After taking a sabbatical from racing in 2010 due to an illness in his family, he returned to the track in 2011 to compete in the Porsche Carrera Cup Great Britain.
