= 2013 Auto GP Series =

The 2013 Auto GP Series was the fourth year of the Auto GP series, and the fifteenth season of the former Euroseries 3000. The championship began on 23 March at Monza in Italy and finished on 6 October at Brno in the Czech Republic, after eight double-header rounds.

== Teams and drivers ==
Team	No.	Driver	Rounds
(United Kingdom) Super Nova International	1	(Italy) Antonio Spavone	1–2
(United Kingdom) Super Nova International	1	(Italy) Francesco Dracone	3
(United Kingdom) Super Nova International	1	(India) Narain Karthikeyan	4–8
(United Kingdom) Super Nova International	2	(Italy) Vittorio Ghirelli	All
(United Kingdom) Super Nova International	3	(Italy) Francesco Dracone	4
(United Kingdom) Comtec by Virtuosi	4	(Venezuela) Roberto La Rocca	6–8
(United Kingdom) Virtuosi UK	5	(Italy) Andrea Roda	All
(United Kingdom) Virtuosi UK	6	(Russia) Max Snegirev	All
(Austria) Zele Racing	8	(United Kingdom) Luciano Bacheta	1–4
(Austria) Zele Racing	8	(Austria) Christian Klien	5
(Austria) Zele Racing	8	(Czech Republic) Josef Král	8
(Austria) Zele Racing	9	(India) Narain Karthikeyan	1–3
(Austria) Zele Racing	9	(Hungary) Tamás Pál Kiss	4–5, 8
(Italy) Ghinzani Motorsport	13	(Romania) Robert Vișoiu	All
(Italy) Ghinzani Motorsport	22	(Italy) Kevin Giovesi	4–8
(Italy) Euronova Racing	15	(Japan) Yoshitaka Kuroda	All
(Italy) Euronova Racing	16	(Japan) Kimiya Sato	All
(Spain) Ibiza Racing Team	18	(Italy) Sergio Campana	All
(Spain) Ibiza Racing Team	20	(Italy) Giuseppe Cipriani	1–3
(Spain) Ibiza Racing Team	20	(Italy) Fabrizio Crestani	4
(Spain) Ibiza Racing Team	20	(Italy) Francesco Dracone	5, 8
(Spain) Ibiza Racing Team	20	(Hungary) Tamás Pál Kiss	6–7
(Italy) MLR 71	24	(Italy) Giacomo Ricci	1
(Italy) MLR 71	24	(Hungary) Tamás Pál Kiss	3
(Italy) MLR 71	24	(Italy) Michela Cerruti	6, 8
(Italy) MLR 71	71	(Italy) Michele La Rosa	All
(Netherlands) Manor MP Motorsport	25	(Italy) Riccardo Agostini	1–4
(Netherlands) Manor MP Motorsport	26	(Netherlands) Meindert van Buuren	All
(Netherlands) Manor MP Motorsport	27	(Netherlands) Daniël de Jong	2–8

== Race calendar and results ==
The provisional calendar for the 2013 season was released on 17 January 2013. But on 7 February 2013 it was revealed that Moscow Raceway were dropped from schedule due to cost reasons. Silverstone Circuit will take Moscow Raceway's place in the calendar. On 24 April 2013, the calendar was altered again, with dropping Zandvoort due to clash with German GP2 Series and Formula One rounds and changing to Mugello Circuit.

Round		Circuit/Location	Date	Pole position	Fastest lap	Winning driver	Winning team	Supporting
1	R1	(Italy) Autodromo Nazionale Monza	23 March	(Italy) Riccardo Agostini	(Italy) Sergio Campana	(Italy) Sergio Campana	(Spain) Ibiza Racing Team	FIA WTCC Race of Italy
1	R2	(Italy) Autodromo Nazionale Monza	24 March		(Japan) Kimiya Sato	(Japan) Kimiya Sato	(Italy) Euronova Racing	FIA WTCC Race of Italy
2	R3	(Morocco) Marrakech Street Circuit	6 April	(Italy) Sergio Campana	(India) Narain Karthikeyan	(Italy) Sergio Campana	(Spain) Ibiza Racing Team	FIA WTCC Race of Morocco
2	R4	(Morocco) Marrakech Street Circuit	7 April		(Italy) Vittorio Ghirelli	(United Kingdom) Luciano Bacheta	(Austria) Zele Racing	FIA WTCC Race of Morocco
3	R5	(Hungary) Hungaroring	5 May	(Italy) Vittorio Ghirelli	(Italy) Vittorio Ghirelli	(Japan) Kimiya Sato	(Italy) Euronova Racing	FIA WTCC Race of Hungary
3	R6	(Hungary) Hungaroring	5 May		(Italy) Vittorio Ghirelli	(Italy) Vittorio Ghirelli	(United Kingdom) Super Nova International	FIA WTCC Race of Hungary
4	R7	(United Kingdom) Silverstone Circuit	1 June	(India) Narain Karthikeyan	(Italy) Vittorio Ghirelli	(India) Narain Karthikeyan	(United Kingdom) Super Nova International	Blancpain Endurance Series
4	R8	(United Kingdom) Silverstone Circuit	2 June		(Japan) Kimiya Sato	(Japan) Kimiya Sato	(Italy) Euronova Racing	Blancpain Endurance Series
5	R9	(Italy) Mugello Circuit	13 July	(India) Narain Karthikeyan	(Italy) Kevin Giovesi	(Italy) Sergio Campana	(Spain) Ibiza Racing Team	ACI Racing Weekend
5	R10	(Italy) Mugello Circuit	14 July		(India) Narain Karthikeyan	(India) Narain Karthikeyan	(United Kingdom) Super Nova International	ACI Racing Weekend
6	R11	(Germany) Nürburgring	17 August	(India) Narain Karthikeyan	(Italy) Vittorio Ghirelli	(India) Narain Karthikeyan	(United Kingdom) Super Nova International	Deutsche Tourenwagen Masters
6	R12	(Germany) Nürburgring	18 August		(Japan) Kimiya Sato	(Japan) Kimiya Sato	(Italy) Euronova Racing	Deutsche Tourenwagen Masters
7	R13	(United Kingdom) Donington Park	31 August	(India) Narain Karthikeyan	(Japan) Kimiya Sato	(Italy) Vittorio Ghirelli	(United Kingdom) Super Nova International	Superstars Series
7	R14	(United Kingdom) Donington Park	1 September		(India) Narain Karthikeyan	(India) Narain Karthikeyan	(United Kingdom) Super Nova International	Superstars Series
8	R15	(Czech Republic) Masaryk Circuit	5 October	(Italy) Vittorio Ghirelli	(Hungary) Tamás Pál Kiss	(India) Narain Karthikeyan	(United Kingdom) Super Nova International	European Touring Car Cup
8	R16	(Czech Republic) Masaryk Circuit	6 October		(Japan) Kimiya Sato	(Japan) Kimiya Sato	(Italy) Euronova Racing	European Touring Car Cup

== Championship standings ==
- Points for both championships were awarded as follows:

Race
Position	1st	2nd	3rd	4th	5th	6th	7th	8th	9th	10th
**Race One**	25	18	15	12	10	8	6	4	2	1
**Race Two**	20	15	12	10	8	6	4	3	2	1

In addition:

- One point will be awarded for Pole position for Race One
- One point will be awarded for fastest lap in each race

=== Drivers' standings ===
Pos	Driver	MNZ (Italy)		MAR (Morocco)		HUN (Hungary)		SIL (United Kingdom)		MUG (Italy)		NÜR (Germany)		DON (United Kingdom)		BRN (Czech Republic)		Points
1	(Italy) Vittorio Ghirelli	4	3	9	2	**2**	1	2	Ret	6	2	3	2	1	4	**2**	3	222
2	(Japan) Kimiya Sato	2	1	3	3	1	6	6	1	Ret	3	4	1	14†	5	4	1	213
3	(Italy) Sergio Campana	1	4	**1**	Ret	3	2	7	2	1	12	5	4	5	6	6	2	197
4	(India) Narain Karthikeyan	5	Ret	6	Ret	8	4	**1**	12	**3**	1	**1**	5	**2**	1	1	DSQ	195
5	(Hungary) Tamás Pál Kiss					5	5	3	7	5	4	6	6	7	8	5	5	99
6	(Italy) Kevin Giovesi							13	3	2	5	2	10	3	3	Ret	6	91
7	(Netherlands) Daniël de Jong			2	Ret	7	7	4	5	DNS	7	Ret	3	6	13	9	8	77
8	(Romania) Robert Vișoiu	3	6	14†	4	15†	10	9	Ret	Ret	15†	7	12	4	11	3	Ret	67
9	(Netherlands) Meindert van Buuren	Ret	10	Ret	6	6	Ret	8	4	10	6	12	DNS	8	2	12	9	57
10	(Italy) Riccardo Agostini	**7**	5	4	Ret	4	3	15	9									53
11	(United Kingdom) Luciano Bacheta	8	2	8	1	16†	9	10	8									49
12	(Italy) Andrea Roda	Ret	11	7	7	9	12	Ret	15	4	10	14	9	9	12	7	4	45
13	(Russia) Max Snegirev	10	Ret	13	5	10	8	11	6	9	11	11	13	12	10	10	10	24
14	(Italy) Antonio Spavone	6	9	5	9†													22
15	(Venezuela) Roberto La Rocca											8	7	11	7	8	7	20
16	(Japan) Yoshitaka Kuroda	11	7	11	8†	12	Ret	12	11	7	8	10	Ret	10	9	11	11	20
17	(Italy) Fabrizio Crestani							5	10									11
18	(Austria) Christian Klien									8	9							6
19	(Italy) Michela Cerruti											9	8			16†	13	5
20	(Italy) Michele La Rosa	12	8	12	10†	14	Ret	14	14	Ret	14	13	11	13	14	14	15	4
21	(Italy) Giuseppe Cipriani	9	13	10	Ret	13	Ret											3
22	(Italy) Francesco Dracone					11	11	Ret	13	Ret	13					13	14	0
23	(Czech Republic) Josef Král															15	12	0
24	(Italy) Giacomo Ricci	Ret	12															0
Pos	Driver	MNZ (Italy)		MAR (Morocco)		HUN (Hungary)		SIL (United Kingdom)		MUG (Italy)		NÜR (Germany)		DON (United Kingdom)		BRN (Czech Republic)		Points

Colour	Result
Gold	Winner
Silver	Second place
Bronze	Third place
Green	Points classification
Blue	Non-points classification
Blue	Non-classified finish (NC)
Purple	Retired, not classified (Ret)
Red	Did not qualify (DNQ)
Red	Did not pre-qualify (DNPQ)
Black	Disqualified (DSQ)
White	Did not start (DNS)
White	Withdrew (WD)
White	Race cancelled (C)
Blank	Did not practice (DNP)
Blank	Did not arrive (DNA)
Blank	Excluded (EX)

Under-21 Trophy

**Bold** – Pole for Race One
Italics – Fastest Lap

=== Teams' Championship ===
Pos	Team	MNZ (Italy)		MAR (Morocco)		HUN (Hungary)		SIL (United Kingdom)		MUG (Italy)		NÜR (Germany)		DON (United Kingdom)		BRN (Czech Republic)		Points
1	(United Kingdom) Super Nova International	4	3	5	2	**2**	1	**1**	12	**3**	1	**1**	2	1	1	1	3	406
1	(United Kingdom) Super Nova International	6	9	9	9†	11	11	2	13	6	2	3	5	**2**	4	**2**	DSQ	406
2	(Spain) Ibiza Racing Team	1	4	**1**	Ret	3	2	7	2	1	12	5	4	5	6	6	2	234
2	(Spain) Ibiza Racing Team	9	13	10	Ret	13	Ret	5	10	Ret	13	6	6	7	8	13	14	234
3	(Italy) Euronova Racing	2	1	3	3	1	6	6	1	7	3	4	1	10	5	4	1	233
3	(Italy) Euronova Racing	11	7	11	8†	12	Ret	12	11	Ret	8	10	Ret	14†	9	11	11	233
4	(Netherlands) Manor MP Motorsport	**7**	5	2	6	4	3	4	4	10	6	12	3	6	2	9	8	179
4	(Netherlands) Manor MP Motorsport	Ret	10	4	Ret	6	7	8	5	DNS	7	Ret	DNS	8	13	12	9	179
5	(Italy) Ghinzani Motorsport	3	6	14†	4	15†	10	9	3	2	5	2	10	3	3	3	6	161
5	(Italy) Ghinzani Motorsport							13	Ret	Ret	15†	7	12	4	11	Ret	Ret	161
6	(Austria) Zele Racing	5	2	6	1	8	4	3	7	5	4					5	5	138
6	(Austria) Zele Racing	8	Ret	8	Ret	16†	9	10	8	8	9					15	12	138
7	(United Kingdom) Virtuosi UK	10	11	7	5	9	8	11	6	4	10	11	9	9	10	7	4	69
7	(United Kingdom) Virtuosi UK	Ret	Ret	13	7	10	12	Ret	15	9	11	14	13	12	12	10	10	69
8	(Italy) MLR 71	12	8	12	10†	5	5	14	14	Ret	14	9	8	13	14	14	13	27
8	(Italy) MLR 71	Ret	12			14	Ret					13	11			16†	15	27
9	(United Kingdom) Comtec by Virtuosi											8	7	11	7	8	7	20
Pos	Team	MNZ (Italy)		MAR (Morocco)		HUN (Hungary)		SIL (United Kingdom)		MUG (Italy)		NÜR (Germany)		DON (United Kingdom)		BRN (Czech Republic)		Points

Colour	Result
Gold	Winner
Silver	Second place
Bronze	Third place
Green	Points classification
Blue	Non-points classification
Blue	Non-classified finish (NC)
Purple	Retired, not classified (Ret)
Red	Did not qualify (DNQ)
Red	Did not pre-qualify (DNPQ)
Black	Disqualified (DSQ)
White	Did not start (DNS)
White	Withdrew (WD)
White	Race cancelled (C)
Blank	Did not practice (DNP)
Blank	Did not arrive (DNA)
Blank	Excluded (EX)

**Bold** – Pole for Race One
Italics – Fastest Lap
