= Daniel Juncadella =

Spanish racing driver

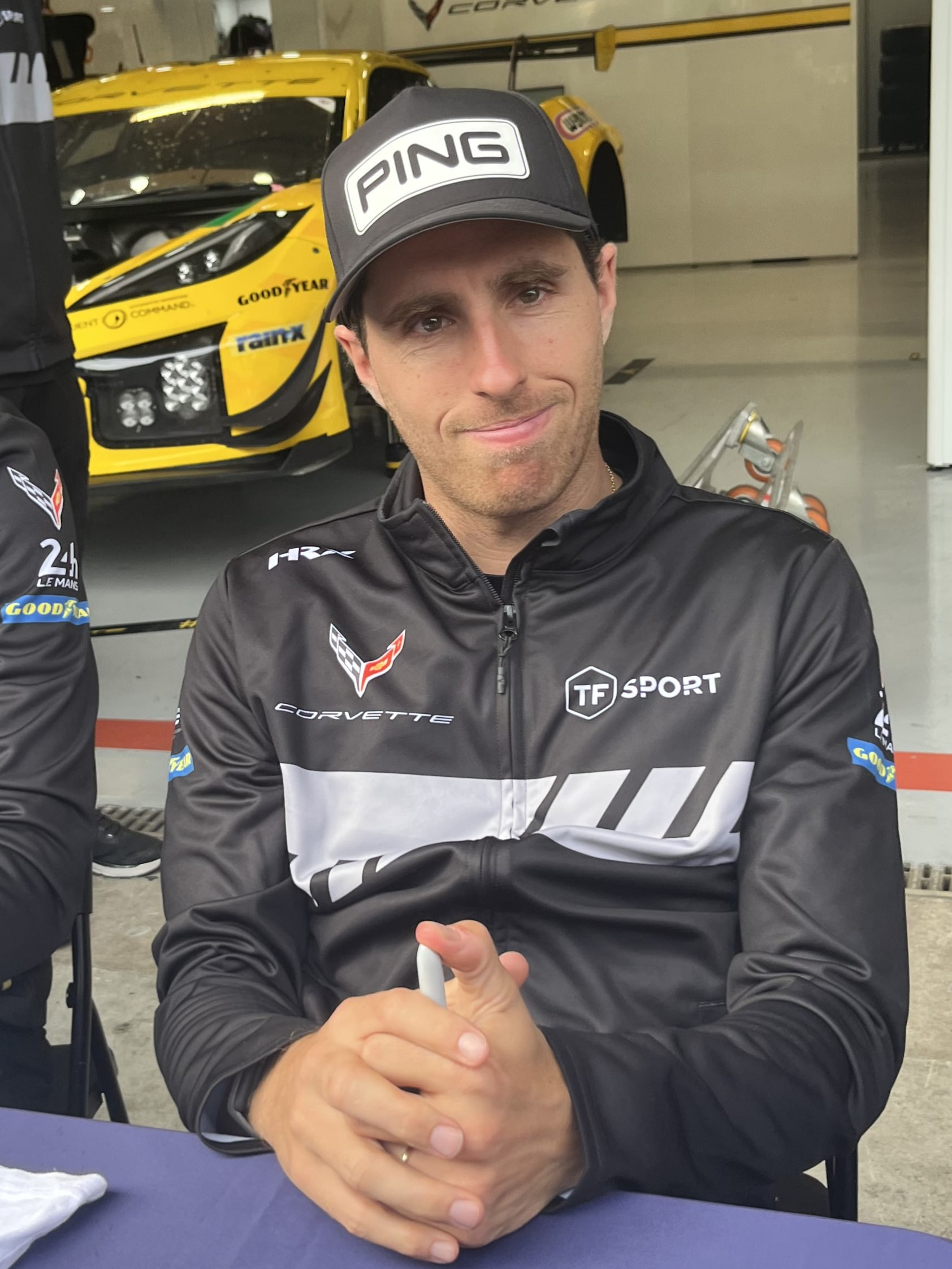
- Juncadella at the 2025 6 Hours of São Paulo
- Nationality: (Spain) Spanish
- Born: Daniel Juncadella Pérez-Sala; 7 May 1991 (age 35) Barcelona, Spain
- Relatives: Luis Pérez-Sala (uncle); Alex Soler-Roig (uncle)

DTM career
- Debut season: 2013
- Current team: Mercedes-AMG Team GruppeM Racing
- Categorisation: FIA Platinum
- Car number: 8
- Former teams: Mücke Motorsport, HWA Team, R-Motorsport II
- Starts: 110
- Championships: 0
- Wins: 1
- Poles: 3
- Fastest laps: 6
- Best finish: 9th in 2021
- Finished last season: 9th (77 pts)

Previous series
- 2015 2012 2010–2012 2010 2008–2009 2008 2007 2007: Euroformula Open; FIA European Formula 3 Championship; Formula 3 Euro Series; GP3 Series; Formula BMW Europe; Formula BMW Americas; Formula BMW ADAC; Master Junior Formula

Championship titles
- 2023 2022 2022 2012 2012 2012 2011: Michelin Endurance Cup – GTD Pro; GT World Challenge Europe Endurance Cup; Intercontinental GT Challenge; Formula 3 Euro Series; FIA European Formula 3 Championship; Masters of Formula 3 Macau Grand Prix
Medal record
GT3
Representing Spain
FIA Motorsport Games
Bronze medal – third place	2024 Valencia	GT Sprint

Daniel Juncadella Pérez-Sala (born 7 May 1991) is a Spanish racing driver who currently competes in the FIA World Endurance Championship for Genesis Magma Racing. A Macau Grand Prix winner and Formula 3 champion in his youth, he was a test driver in Formula One before moving on to sports car racing. As a Mercedes-AMG factory driver, he won the GT World Challenge Europe Endurance Cup, Intercontinental GT Challenge and Spa 24 Hours.

He is the son of Xavier Juncadella and nephew of José María Juncadella, Alex Soler-Roig and Luis Pérez-Sala, also racecar drivers.

== Early career ==
=== Karting ===
Juncadella began his motorsport career in karting in 2004, finishing 21st in the Copa Campeones Trophy Junior. He also finished 32nd in the Andrea Margutti Trophy ICA Junior class.

=== Master Junior Formula ===
Juncadella began his formula racing career in the 2007 Master Junior Formula season. He finished as runner-up in the championship, with seven wins and 359 points; losing out to Isaac Lopez by nine points.

=== Formula BMW ===
After six races at the end of the 2007 Formula BMW ADAC season, the following season, Juncadella competed in the new-for-2008 Formula BMW Europe series for EuroInternational. He finished fourth in the standings, taking thirteen points-scoring positions in sixteen races, including two wins at the Hungaroring. For 2009, Juncadella remained in the series, staying with EuroInternational. He finished as runner-up behind Brazilian team-mate Felipe Nasr in the championship with one win at Monza Circuit. Juncadella finished every race in the points, but was not enough to keep his backing from the Red Bull Junior Team.

=== Formula Three ===
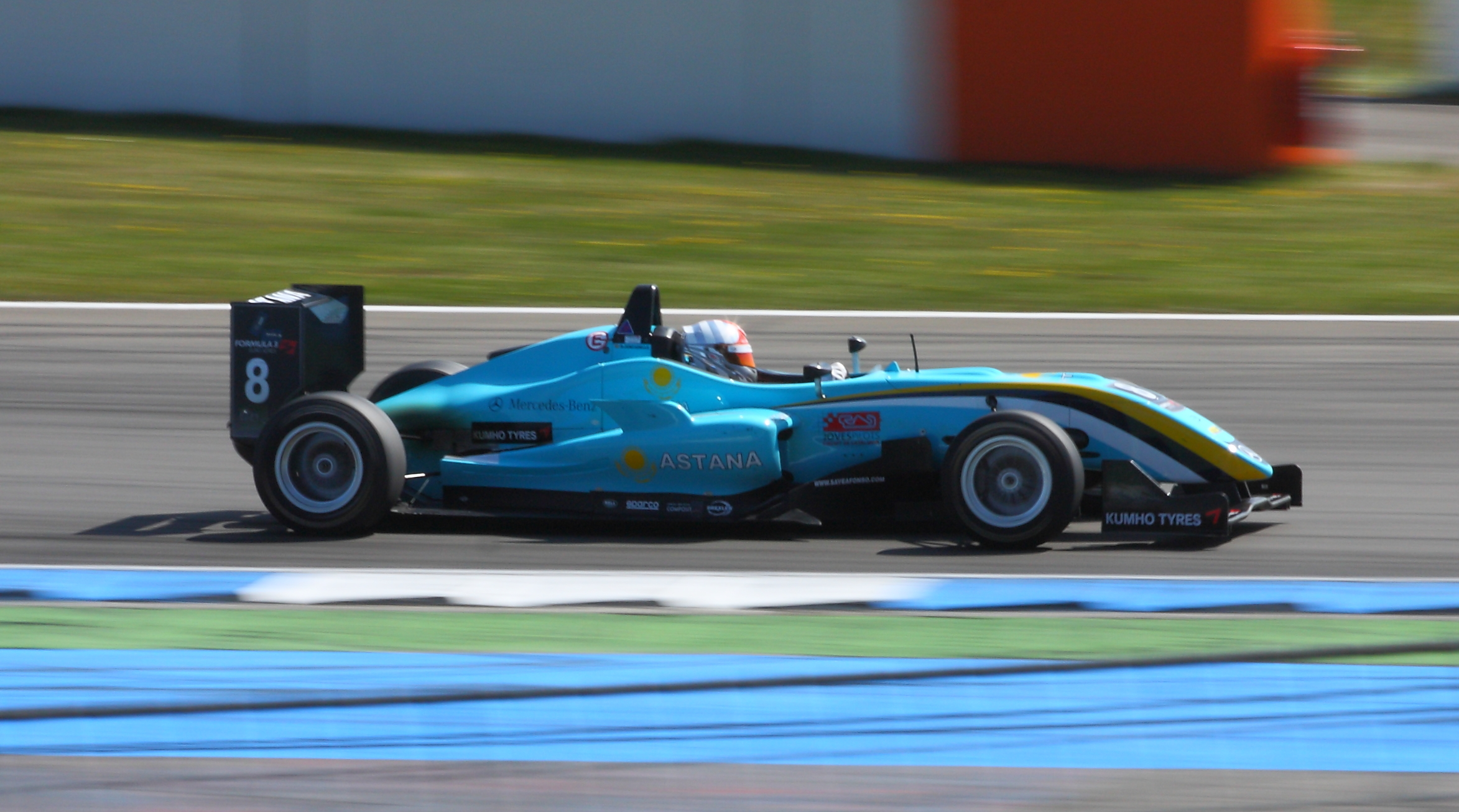
Juncadella competing at the second round of the 2010 Formula 3 Euro Series at Hockenheim.

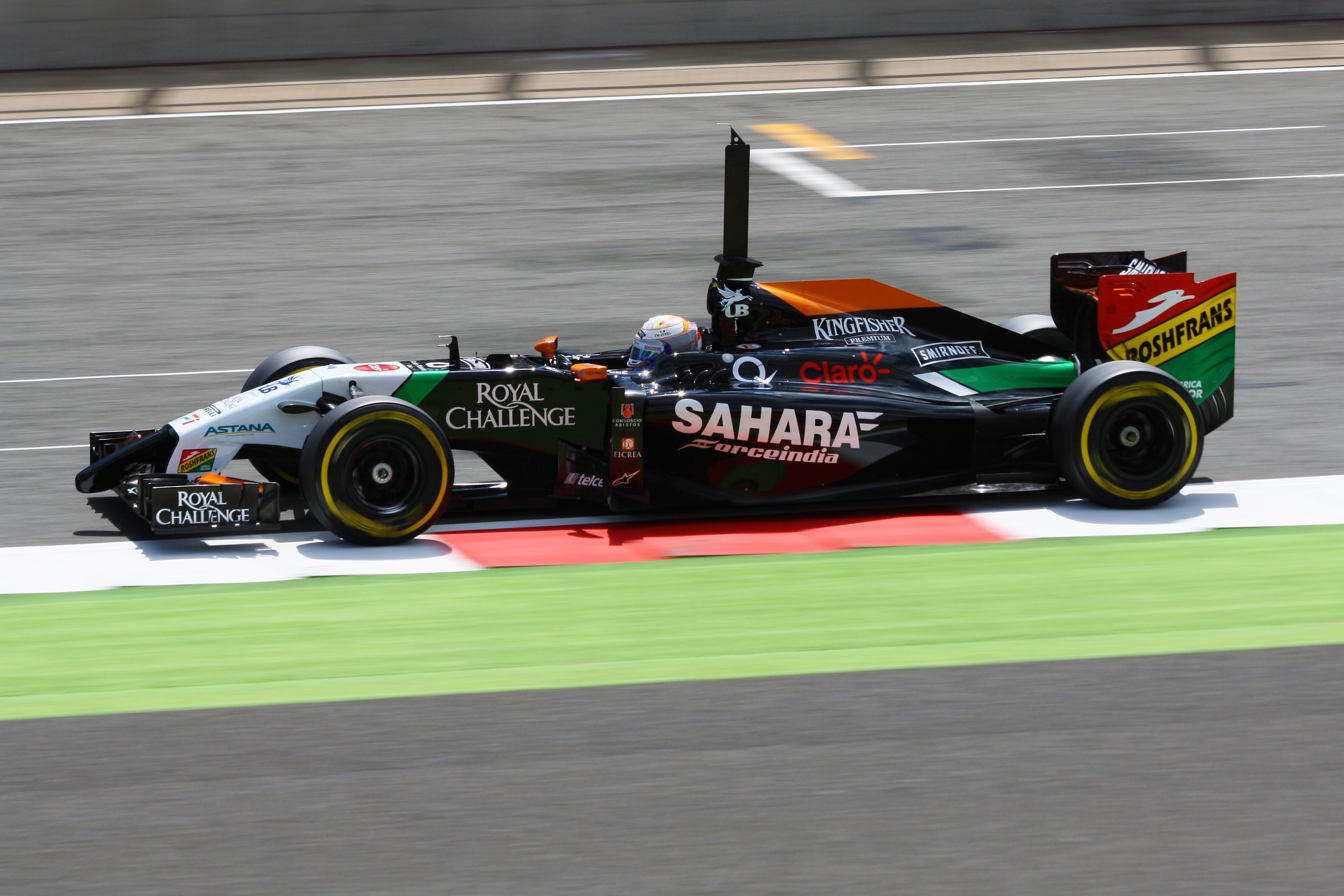
Juncadella with Force India in Silverstone in 2014

Juncadella stepped up to the Formula 3 Euro Series for the 2010 season, joining Nicolas Marroc at Prema Powerteam, supported by professional road bicycle racing team Astana. At his first event at Circuit Paul Ricard, Juncadella took his first pole position before finishing fourth in the first race.

=== Formula One ===
Juncadella tested with Williams F1 during the Young Drivers test at Silverstone, setting the fifth best time on the first day.

On 24 January 2014, Juncadella joined Force India as a reserve driver. He attended all races and took part in Friday practice sessions.

In December 2024, Juncadella joined Aston Martin (the successor of Force India) as a simulation driver for the 2025 season.

== Sportscar career ==
=== DTM ===
For the 2013 season, Juncadella raced with Mercedes in the DTM. Following three seasons with Mücke Motorsport, the Spaniard left the series for a year to race for AKKA ASP in the Blancpain GT Series Endurance Cup and Sprint Cup championships. Juncadella returned to the DTM in 2018, where he scored three pole positions and two podiums, including a victory at Brands Hatch, on his way to 15th in the standings. The following year, Juncadella joined the Aston Martin Vantage DTM project with R-Motorsport, and although he beat teammates Paul di Resta, Jake Dennis, and Ferdinand Habsburg in the overall classifications, the Spanish driver only finished 14th in points.

In 2021, Juncadella returned after a year of absence to pilot GruppeM Racing's Mercedes during the series's first season under GT3 regulations. He was able to finish in the points more often than not, which yielded ninth position in the standings with one podium at the Nürburgring.

=== Focus on GTWC ===
Following multiple years of incomplete campaigns in the series, Juncadella would partake in a full season of the GT World Challenge Europe Endurance Cup in 2022, driving at AKKodis ASP with fellow factory drivers Raffaele Marciello and Jules Gounon. The trio shone throughout the year, notably winning the 24 Hours of Spa, and secured the Endurance Cup title thanks to another victory at the Barcelona season finale. During 2022, Juncadella also drove in all four events of the Intercontinental GT Challenge, adding a victory at Indianapolis to the aforementioned one at Spa and finishing second at the Bathurst 12 Hours to win the IGTC drivers' championship.

=== IMSA ===
The 2023 season saw Juncadella compete for WeatherTech Racing in the GTD Pro category of the IMSA SportsCar Championship, where he paired up with Jules Gounon. Together with Maro Engel, the duo shone at the designated endurance races, winning their class at the 24 Hours of Daytona as well as at the season-ending Petit Le Mans race, wins which helped them towards a Michelin Endurance Cup title. Two further wins in sprint events helped them towards second place in the overall classification, as Lexus's Jack Hawksworth and Ben Barnicoat dominated the year.

== Personal life ==
Juncadella list his hobbies as cross-country skiing, padel tennis, golf, music, going out, while his favourite circuit is Monza Circuit, where he won once during the 2009 Formula BMW Europe season. His favorite drivers are Mika Häkkinen and Michael Schumacher.

Juncadella is the nephew of Luis Pérez-Sala, who drove for the Minardi Formula One team in 1988 and 1989 and was team principal of the Spanish HRT F1 in 2012.

== Racing record ==
=== Career summary ===
Season	Series	Team	Races	Wins	Poles	F/Laps	Podiums	Points	Position
2007	Master Formula Junior	Javier Juncadella	21	7	0	13	13	359	**2nd**
2007	Formula BMW ADAC	AM-Holzer Rennsport	6	0	0	0	0	86	23rd
2008	Formula BMW Europe	EuroInternational	16	2	4	1	5	237	4th
2008	Formula BMW World Final	EuroInternational	1	0	0	0	0	N/A	4th
2008	Formula BMW Americas	Euro Junior Team	6	1	0	0	3	54	NC†
2009	Formula BMW Europe	EuroInternational	16	1	0	0	7	288	**2nd**
2010	Formula 3 Euro Series	Prema Powerteam	18	1	1	4	3	35	8th
2010	GP3 Series	Tech 1 Racing	10	0	0	0	1	10	14th
2010	British Formula 3 Championship	Prema Powerteam	3	1	0	2	2	N/A	NC†
2010	Masters of Formula 3	Prema Powerteam	1	0	0	0	0	N/A	16th
2010	Macau Grand Prix	Prema Powerteam	1	0	0	0	0	N/A	NC
2011	Formula 3 Euro Series	Prema Powerteam	27	4	4	3	14	280	**3rd**
2011	FIA Formula 3 International Trophy	Prema Powerteam	8	1	0	0	2	72	**3rd**
2011	Masters of Formula 3	Prema Powerteam	1	0	0	0	0	N/A	NC
2011	Macau Grand Prix	Prema Powerteam	1	1	0	0	1	N/A	**1st**
2012	Formula 3 Euro Series	Prema Powerteam	24	5	5	6	6	240	**1st**
2012	FIA European Formula 3 Championship	Prema Powerteam	20	5	5	5	5	252	**1st**
2012	Masters of Formula 3	Prema Powerteam	1	1	1	1	1	N/A	**1st**
2012	Macau Grand Prix	Prema Powerteam	1	0	0	0	0	N/A	DNF
2013	Deutsche Tourenwagen Masters	Mücke Motorsport	10	0	0	0	0	21	16th
2013	Formula One	Williams F1 Team	Test driver						
2014	Deutsche Tourenwagen Masters	Mücke Motorsport	10	0	0	0	0	22	18th
2014	Formula One	Sahara Force India F1 Team	Test driver						
2015	Deutsche Tourenwagen Masters	Mücke Motorsport	18	0	0	0	0	26	20th
2015	Blancpain Endurance Series	Rowe Racing	5	0	0	0	0	42	7th
2015	Euroformula Open Championship	Emilio de Villota Motorsport	2	0	0	0	1	0	NC†
2015	Macau Grand Prix	Fortec Motorsport	0	0	0	0	0	N/A	DNS
2016	Deutsche Tourenwagen Masters	Mercedes-Benz DTM Team HWA I	18	0	0	2	0	6	24th
2016	British GT Championship	Black Falcon	1	0	0	0	0	18	16th
2016	Blancpain GT Series Endurance Cup	Black Falcon	1	0	0	0	0	0	NC
2016	Blancpain GT Series Endurance Cup – Pro-Am	Black Falcon	1	0	0	0	0	2	45th
2016	Macau Grand Prix	Hitech GP	1	0	0	0	0	N/A	8th
2017	Blancpain GT Series Sprint Cup	AKKA ASP	10	0	0	0	0	19	15th
2017	Blancpain GT Series Endurance Cup	AKKA ASP	5	1	1	0	1	41	6th
2017	Intercontinental GT Challenge	Mercedes-AMG Team AKKA ASP	1	0	0	0	0	0	NC
2017	FIA GT World Cup	Mercedes-AMG Driving Academy	1	0	0	0	0	N/A	8th
2017	24 Hours of Nürburgring – SP9	Black Falcon	1	0	0	0	0	N/A	13th
2017–18	Formula E	Mahindra Racing	Test driver						
2018	Deutsche Tourenwagen Masters	Mercedes-AMG Motorsport REMUS	20	1	3	4	2	61	15th
2018	Blancpain GT Series Endurance Cup	Mercedes-AMG Team AKKA ASP	3	0	0	0	1	33	12th
2018	Intercontinental GT Challenge	Mercedes-AMG Team AKKA ASP	1	0	0	0	1	15	16th
2018	IMSA SportsCar Championship	Jackie Chan DCR JOTA	1	0	0	0	0	20	55th
2018	24 Hours of Nürburgring – SP9	Mercedes-AMG Team HTP Motorsport	1	0	0	0	0	N/A	DNF
2018–19	Formula E	HWA Racelab	Test driver						
2019	Deutsche Tourenwagen Masters	R-Motorsport II	18	0	0	0	0	23	14th
2019–20	Formula E	Mercedes-EQ Formula E Team	Reserve driver						
2020	24 Hours of Nürburgring – SP9	10Q Racing Team Hauer & Zabel GbR	1	0	0	0	0	N/A	DNF
2021	Deutsche Tourenwagen Masters	Mercedes-AMG Team GruppeM Racing	16	0	1	0	1	77	9th
2021	GT World Challenge Europe Endurance Cup	AKKA ASP Team	3	0	1	0	1	36	9th
2021	IMSA SportsCar Championship – GTD	Alegra Motorsports	1	0	0	0	0	300	47th
2021	Intercontinental GT Challenge	Mercedes-AMG Team AKKA ASP	2	0	1	0	1	18	11th
2021	24 Hours of Nürburgring – SP9	Mercedes-AMG Team GetSpeed	1	0	0	0	1	N/A	**3rd**
2022	IMSA SportsCar Championship – GTD Pro	WeatherTech Racing	3	0	0	2	0	809	13th
2022	IMSA SportsCar Championship – GTD	WeatherTech Racing	1	0	0	1	0	569	38th
2022	IMSA SportsCar Championship – GTD	Gilbert Korthoff Motorsports	1	0	0	0	1	569	38th
2022	ADAC GT Masters	Mercedes-AMG Team zvo	5	0	0	0	0	105	13th
2022	ADAC GT Masters	Mann-Filter Team Landgraf	6	0	2	1	3	105	13th
2022	GT World Challenge Europe Endurance Cup	AKKodis ASP Team	5	1	1	1	3	89	**1st**
2022	Intercontinental GT Challenge	Mercedes-AMG Team Craft-Bamboo Racing	2	1	0	0	2	68	**1st**
2022	Intercontinental GT Challenge	Mercedes-AMG Team AKKodis ASP	1	1	1	0	1	68	**1st**
2022	Intercontinental GT Challenge	Mercedes-AMG GruppeM Racing	1	0	0	0	0	68	**1st**
2022	24 Hours of Nürburgring – SP9	Mercedes-AMG Team GetSpeed BWT	1	0	0	0	1	N/A	**3rd**
2022	FIA Motorsport Games GT Sprint	Team Spain	1	0	0	0	0	N/A	9th
2023	IMSA SportsCar Championship – GTD Pro	WeatherTech Racing	11	4	1	2	6	3648	**2nd**
2023	GT World Challenge Europe Endurance Cup	Mercedes-AMG Team GruppeM Racing	1	0	0	0	0	7	20th
2023	GT World Challenge Asia – GT3	Craft-Bamboo Racing	8	2	2	1	3	91	7th
2023	GT World Challenge Asia – Pro-Am Cup	Craft-Bamboo Racing	8	2	2	1	3	92	8th
2023	Intercontinental GT Challenge	Mercedes-AMG Craft-Bamboo Racing	1	0	0	0	0	23	17th
2023	Intercontinental GT Challenge	Mercedes-AMG Team GruppeM Racing	2	0	0	0	1	23	17th
2023	Nürburgring Langstrecken-Serie – SP9	GetSpeed Performance / Mercedes-AMG Team GetSpeed	1	0	0	0	0	0	NC†
2023	24 Hours of Nürburgring – SP9	Mercedes-AMG Team GetSpeed	1	0	0	0	0	N/A	DNF
2023	FIA GT World Cup	Mercedes-AMG Team Craft-Bamboo Racing	1	0	0	0	0	N/A	5th
2024	FIA World Endurance Championship – LMGT3	TF Sport	8	0	0	0	1	37	14th
2024	IMSA SportsCar Championship – GTD Pro	Corvette Racing by Pratt Miller Motorsports	3	0	0	0	0	808	20th
2024	Nürburgring Langstrecken-Serie – SP9	Mercedes-AMG Team HRT	2	0	2	0	0	8	30th
2024	Nürburgring Langstrecken-Serie – SP9	Mercedes-AMG Team Bilstein by HRT	1	0	0	0	0	8	30th
2024	Intercontinental GT Challenge	Mercedes-AMG Team Bilstein by HRT	1	0	0	0	1	16	15th
2024	Intercontinental GT Challenge	Mercedes-AMG Team Craft-Bamboo Racing	1	0	0	0	0	16	15th
2024	Intercontinental GT Challenge	Mercedes-AMG Team GruppeM Racing	1	0	0	0	0	16	15th
2024	GT World Challenge Europe Endurance Cup	Mercedes-AMG Team GruppeM Racing	1	0	0	0	0	0	NC
2024	24 Hours of Nürburgring – SP9	Mercedes-AMG Team Bilstein by HRT	1	0	0	0	0	N/A	4th
2024	FIA Motorsport Games GT Sprint	Team Spain	1	0	0	0	1	N/A	**3rd**
2024	FIA GT World Cup	Mercedes-AMG Craft-Bamboo Racing	1	0	0	0	0	N/A	10th
2025	FIA World Endurance Championship - LMGT3	TF Sport	8	1	0	0	1	78	6th
2025	IMSA SportsCar Championship - GTD Pro	Corvette Racing by Pratt Miller Motorsports	3	0	0	0	2	937	16th
2025	European Le Mans Series - LMP2	IDEC Sport	6	3	0	0	4	90	**3rd**
2025	Nürburgring Langstrecken-Serie - SP9	Red Bull Team ABT							
2025	24 Hours of Nürburgring - SP9	Red Bull Team ABT	1	0	0	0	0	N/A	DNF
2025	Formula One	Aston Martin Aramco F1 Team	Simulator driver						
2026	GT World Challenge Europe Endurance Cup	Mercedes-AMG Team Verstappen Racing	4	0	0	0	1	21	11th
2026	GT World Challenge Europe Sprint Cup	Mercedes-AMG Team Verstappen Racing	10	1	2	1	3	59	**3rd**
2026	Nürburgring Langstrecken-Serie - SP9	Mercedes-AMG Team Verstappen Racing							
2026	24 Hours of Nürburgring - SP9	Mercedes-AMG Team Verstappen Racing	1	0	0	0	0	N/A	19th
2026	FIA World Endurance Championship - Hypercar	Genesis Magma Racing	8	0	0	0	0	0	28th
2026	24 Hours of Le Mans - Hypercar	Genesis Magma Racing	1	0	0	0	0	N/A	13th

^{†} As Juncadella was a guest driver, he was ineligible for points.

=== Complete Formula BMW ADAC results ===
(key)

Year	Entrant	1	2	3	4	5	6	7	8	9	10	11	12	13	14	15	16	17	18	DC	Points
2007	AM-Holzer Rennsport GmbH	OSC1; 1	OSC1; 2	LAU; 1	LAU; 2	NOR; 1	NOR; 2	NÜR1; 1	NÜR1; 2	ZAN; 1	ZAN; 2	OSC2; 1; 9	OSC2; 2 Ret	NÜR2; 1; 12	NÜR2; 2; 21†	CAT; 1; 11	CAT; 2; 9	HOC; 1	HOC; 2	23rd	86

=== Complete Formula BMW Europe results ===
(key)

Year	Entrant	1	2	3	4	5	6	7	8	9	10	11	12	13	14	15	16	DC	Points
2008	EuroInternational	CAT; 1; 2	CAT; 2; 3	**ZOL**; **1**; 2	**ZOL**; **2**; 6	SIL; 1; 8	SIL; 2; 7	HOC; 1; 6	HOC; 2; 4	**HUN**; **1**; 1	**HUN**; **2**; 1	VSC; 1 Ret	VSC; 2; 5	SPA; 1; 10	SPA; 2; 7	MNZ; 1 Ret	MNZ; 2; 17	4th	237
2009	EuroInternational	CAT; 1; 5	CAT; 2; 3	ZAN; 1; 3	ZAN; 2; 3	SIL; 1; 7	SIL; 2; 7	NÜR; 1; 7	NÜR; 2; 4	HUN; 1; 5	HUN; 2; 3	VSC; 1; 5	VSC; 2; 4	SPA; 1; 6	SPA; 2; 3	MNZ; 1; 1	MNZ; 2; 2	2nd	288

=== Complete Formula 3 Euro Series results ===
(key)

Year	Entrant	Engine	1	2	3	4	5	6	7	8	9	10	11	12	13	14	15	16	17	18	19	20	21	22	23	24	25	26	27	DC	Points
2010	Prema Powerteam	Mercedes	**LEC**; **1**; 4	LEC; 2; 7	HOC; 1; 8	HOC; 2; 2	VAL; 1; 9	VAL; 2; 9	NOR; 1; 10	NOR; 2; 6	NÜR; 1; 12	NÜR; 2; 10	ZAN; 1 Ret	ZAN; 2; 9	BRH; 1; 6	BRH; 2; 3	OSC; 1; 4	OSC; 2; 6	HOC; 1; 8	HOC; 2; 1										8th	35
2011	Prema Powerteam	Mercedes	LEC; 1; 3	LEC; 2; 3	LEC; 3; 1	HOC; 1; 6	HOC; 2; 1	HOC; 3; 4	ZAN; 1; 5	ZAN; 2; 7	ZAN; 3; 12	**RBR**; **1**; 2	RBR; 2; 6	**RBR**; **3**; 1	NOR; 1 Ret	NOR; 2; 3	NOR; 3; 11	**NÜR**; **1**; 2	NÜR; 2; 4	**NÜR**; **3**; 1	SIL; 1; 3	SIL; 2; 2	SIL; 3; 8	VAL; 1; 4	VAL; 2; 3	VAL; 3; 2	HOC; 1; 7	HOC; 2; 6	HOC; 3; 3	3rd	280
2012	Prema Powerteam	Mercedes	HOC; 1; 1	HOC; 2 Ret	HOC; 3; 1	**BRH**; **1**; 2	BRH; 2; 12	**BRH**; **3**; 8	RBR; 1; 7	RBR; 2; 8	**RBR**; **3**; 1	NOR; 2 DSQ	NOR; 2; 11	NOR; 3; 2	**NÜR**; **1**; 1	NÜR; 2; 8	**NÜR**; **3** DSQ	ZAN; 1; 6	ZAN; 2; 2	ZAN; 3; 1	VAL; 1; 2	VAL; 2; 7	**VAL**; **3**; 2	HOC; 1; 13	HOC; 2 Ret	HOC; 3; 4				1st	240

=== Complete GP3 Series results ===
(key) (Races in bold indicate pole position) (Races in italics indicate fastest lap)

Year	Entrant	1	2	3	4	5	6	7	8	9	10	11	12	13	14	15	16	DC	Points
2010	Tech 1 Racing	CAT; FEA; 11	CAT; SPR; 11	IST; FEA	IST; SPR	VAL; FEA	VAL; SPR	SIL; FEA; Ret	SIL; SPR; Ret	HOC; FEA; 8	HOC; SPR; 2	HUN; FEA	HUN; SPR	SPA; FEA; 5	SPA; SPR; DSQ	MNZ; FEA; 22	MNZ; SPR; Ret	14th	10

=== Complete Deutsche Tourenwagen Masters results ===
(key) (Races in bold indicate pole position) (Races in italics indicate fastest lap)

Year	Team	Car	1	2	3	4	5	6	7	8	9	10	11	12	13	14	15	16	17	18	19	20	Pos	Points
2013	Mücke Motorsport	DTM AMG Mercedes C-Coupé	HOC; 12	BRH; 20	SPL; 13	LAU; 6	NOR; 4	MSC; 18	NÜR; Ret	OSC; 17	ZAN; 17	HOC; 10											16th	21
2014	Mücke Motorsport	DTM AMG Mercedes C-Coupé	HOC; 19	OSC; Ret	HUN; 16	NOR; 13	MSC; 15	SPL; 15	NÜR; 5	LAU; 4	ZAN; 17	HOC; 21†											18th	22
2015	Mücke Motorsport	DTM AMG Mercedes C-Coupé	HOC; 1 Ret	HOC; 2; 15	LAU; 1; 10	LAU; 2; 6	NOR; 1; 10	NOR; 2; 8	ZAN; 1; 16	ZAN; 2 Ret	SPL; 1; 11	SPL; 2 Ret	MSC; 1; 5	MSC; 2; 13	OSC; 1; 10	OSC; 2; 15	NÜR; 1; 17	NÜR; 2; 10	HOC; 1; 13	HOC; 2; 12			20th	26
2016	Mercedes-Benz DTM Team HWA I	Mercedes-AMG C63 DTM	HOC; 1 Ret	HOC; 2; 16†	SPL; 1 Ret	SPL; 2; 12	LAU; 1; 18	LAU; 2 Ret	NOR; 1; 19	NOR; 2 DSQ	ZAN; 1; 8	ZAN; 2; 12	MSC; 1; 24	MSC; 2; 12	NÜR; 1; 17	NÜR; 2; 9	HUN; 1; 11	HUN; 2 DSQ	HOC; 1; 21	HOC; 2 Ret			24th	6
2018	Mercedes-AMG Motorsport REMUS	Mercedes-AMG C63 DTM	HOC; 1; 8	HOC; 2; 18	LAU; 1; 14	LAU; 2; 12	HUN; 1; 10	HUN; 2; 11	NOR; 1; 8	**NOR**; **2**; 3	ZAN; 1; 16	ZAN; 2; 12	**BRH**; **1**; 1	BRH; 2; 9	MIS; 1; 14†	MIS; 2; 17	NÜR; 1; 15	NÜR; 2; 17†	**SPL**; **1**; 14	SPL; 2; 11	HOC; 1; 14	HOC; 2; 15	15th	61
2019	R-Motorsport II	Aston Martin Vantage DTM	HOC; 1; 9	HOC; 2; 16†	ZOL; 1 Ret	ZOL; 2 Ret	MIS; 1; 13	MIS; 2; 14	NOR; 1; 6	NOR; 2; 10	ASS; 1 Ret	ASS; 2; 7	BRH; 1; 10	BRH; 2; 8	LAU; 1; 12	LAU; 2; 12	NÜR; 1; 10	NÜR; 2; 12	HOC; 1 Ret	HOC; 2 Ret			14th	23
2021	Mercedes-AMG Team GruppeM Racing	Mercedes-AMG GT3 Evo	MNZ; 1; 5^{1}	MNZ; 2; 11	LAU; 1 Ret	LAU; 2; 7	ZOL; 1 Ret	ZOL; 2; 12	NÜR; 1; 8	NÜR; 2; 2^{2}	RBR; 1; 11	RBR; 2; 12	ASS; 1 Ret	ASS; 2 Ret	HOC; 1; 6	HOC; 2; 5	NOR; 1; 7	NOR; 2; 5					9th	77

^{†} Driver did not finish, but was classified as he completed 75% of the winner's race distance.

=== Complete Formula One participations ===
(key) (Races in bold indicate pole position) (Races in italics indicates fastest lap)

Year	Entrant	Chassis	Engine	1	2	3	4	5	6	7	8	9	10	11	12	13	14	15	16	17	18	19	WDC	Points
2014	Sahara Force India F1 Team	Force India VJM07	Mercedes PU106A Hybrid 1.6 V6 t	AUS	MAL	BHR	CHN	ESP	MON	CAN	AUT	GBR; TD	GER	HUN	BEL	ITA; TD	SIN	JPN	RUS	USA	BRA; TD	ABU	–	–

=== Complete GT World Challenge Europe results ===
==== GT World Challenge Europe Endurance Cup ====
Year	Team	Car	Class	1	2	3	4	5	6	7	Pos.	Points
2015	Rowe Racing	Mercedes-Benz SLS AMG GT3	Pro	MNZ; 15	SIL; 11	LEC; 4	SPA; 6H; 1	SPA; 12H; 1	SPA; 24H; 16	NÜR; 19	7th	42
2016	Black Falcon	Mercedes-AMG GT3	Pro-Am	MNZ	SIL	LEC	SPA; 6H; 41	SPA; 12H; 46	SPA; 24H; 26	NÜR	45th	2
2017	AKKA ASP	Mercedes-AMG GT3	Pro	MNZ; 30	**SIL**; 11	LEC; 4	SPA; 6H; 10	SPA; 12H; 46	SPA; 24H; Ret	CAT; 1	6th	41
2018	Mercedes-AMG Team AKKA ASP	Mercedes-AMG GT3	Pro	MNZ; 11	SIL	LEC	SPA; 6H; 15	SPA; 12H; 3	SPA; 24H; 6	CAT; 2	12th	33
2021	AKKA ASP Team	Mercedes-AMG GT3 Evo	Pro	MNZ; 2	LEC; 6	SPA; 6H; 8	SPA; 12H; 4	**SPA**; **24H**; Ret	NÜR	CAT	9th	36
2022	AKKodis ASP Team	Mercedes-AMG GT3 Evo	Pro	IMO; 2	LEC; 3	SPA; 6H; 3	SPA; 12H; 3	**SPA**; **24H**; 1	HOC; 40†	CAT; 5	1st	89
2023	Mercedes-AMG Team GruppeM Racing	Mercedes-AMG GT3 Evo	Pro	MNZ	LEC	SPA; 6H; 19	SPA; 12H; 3	SPA; 24H; Ret	NÜR	CAT	20th	7
2024	Mercedes-AMG Team GruppeM Racing	Mercedes-AMG GT3 Evo	Pro	LEC	SPA; 6H; 12	SPA; 12H; 36	SPA; 24H; Ret	NÜR	MNZ	JED	NC	0
2026	Mercedes-AMG Team Verstappen Racing	Mercedes-AMG GT3 Evo	Pro	LEC; 9	MNZ; Ret	SPA; 6H; 10	SPA; 12H; 6	SPA; 24H; Ret	NÜR; 3	ALG	11th	21

==== GT World Challenge Europe Sprint Cup ====
Year	Team	Car	Class	1	2	3	4	5	6	7	8	9	10	Pos.	Points
2017	AKKA ASP	Mercedes-AMG GT3	Pro	MIS; QR; 5	MIS; CR; 4	BRH; QR; 4	BRH; CR; 27	ZOL; QR; 5	ZOL; CR; 24	HUN; QR; 15	HUN; CR; Ret	NÜR; QR; Ret	NÜR; CR; 19	15th	19
2026	Mercedes-AMG Team Verstappen Racing	Mercedes-AMG GT3 Evo	Pro	BRH; 1; 12	BRH; 2; 2	MIS; 1 Ret	**MIS**; **2**; 2	**MAG**; **1**; 1	MAG; 2; 8	ZAN; 1; 5	ZAN; 2; 9	CAT; 1; 12	CAT; 2; 5	3rd	59

=== Complete IMSA SportsCar Championship results ===
(key) (Races in bold indicate pole position; races in italics indicate fastest lap)

Year	Entrant	Class	Make	Engine	1	2	3	4	5	6	7	8	9	10	11	12	Rank	Points
2018	Jackie Chan DCR JOTA	P	Oreca 07	Gibson GK428 4.2 L V8	DAY; 11	SEB	LBH	MDO	DET	WGL	MOS	ELK	LGA	PET			55th	20
2021	Alegra Motorsports	GTD	Mercedes-AMG GT3 Evo	Mercedes-AMG M159 6.2 L V8	DAY	SEB	MDO	DET	WGL	WGL	LIM	ELK	LGA	LBH	VIR	PET; 4	47th	300
2022	WeatherTech Racing	GTD Pro	Mercedes-AMG GT3 Evo	Mercedes-AMG M159 6.2 L V8	DAY; 11			LGA; 6			WGL	MOS; 4	LIM				13th	809
2022	WeatherTech Racing	GTD	Mercedes-AMG GT3 Evo	Mercedes-AMG M159 6.2 L V8										ELK; 11	VIR	PET	38th	569
2022	Gilbert Korthoff Motorsports	GTD	Mercedes-AMG GT3 Evo	Mercedes-AMG M159 6.2 L V8		SEB; 2	LBH		MDO	DET							38th	569
2023	WeatherTech Racing	GTD Pro	Mercedes-AMG GT3 Evo	Mercedes-AMG M159 6.2 L V8	**DAY**; 1	SEB; 3	LBH; 5	LGA; 1	WGL; 4	MOS; 3	LIM; 5	ELK; 5	VIR; 5	IMS; 1	PET; 1		2nd	3648
2024	Corvette Racing by Pratt Miller Motorsports	GTD Pro	Chevrolet Corvette Z06 GT3.R	Chevrolet LT6.R 5.5 L V8	DAY; 5	SEB; 10	LGA	DET	WGL	MOS	ELK	VIR	IMS	PET; 5			20th	808
2025	Corvette Racing by Pratt Miller Motorsports	GTD Pro	Chevrolet Corvette Z06 GT3.R	Chevrolet LT6.R 5.5 L V8	DAY; 2	SEB; 7	LGA	DET	WGL	MOS	ELK	VIR	IMS	PET; 3			16th	937

=== Complete ADAC GT Masters results ===
(key) (Races in bold indicate pole position; races in italics indicate fastest lap)

Year	Team	Car	1	2	3	4	5	6	7	8	9	10	11	12	13	14	DC	Points
2022	Mercedes-AMG Team zvo	Mercedes-AMG GT3 Evo	OSC; 1; 20	OSC; 2; 8	RBR; 1; 16	RBR; 2; 7	ZAN; 1 DNS^{2}	ZAN; 2; 17	NÜR; 1	NÜR; 2							13th	104
2022	Mann-Filter Team Landgraf	Mercedes-AMG GT3 Evo									LAU; 1; 5	LAU; 2; 3	**SAC**; **1**; 2^{1}	SAC; 2; 2	**HOC**; **1**; 5^{1}	HOC; 2 Ret	13th	104

=== Complete FIA World Endurance Championship results ===
(key) (Races in bold indicate pole position; races in italics indicate fastest lap)

Year	Entrant	Class	Car	Engine	1	2	3	4	5	6	7	8	Rank	Points
2024	TF Sport	LMGT3	Chevrolet Corvette Z06 GT3.R	Chevrolet LT6.R 5.5 L V8	QAT; 10	IMO; 8	SPA; 12	LMS; 9	SÃO; Ret	COA; 8	FUJ; Ret	BHR; 3	14th	37
2025	TF Sport	LMGT3	Chevrolet Corvette Z06 GT3.R	Chevrolet LT6.R 5.5 L V8	QAT; 1	IMO; 7	SPA; 13	LMS; 6	SÃO; 7	COA; Ret	FUJ; 11	BHR; 6	6th	78
2026	Genesis Magma Racing	Hypercar	Genesis GMR-001	Genesis G8MR 3.2 L Turbo V8	IMO; 17	SPA; 13	LMS; 12	SÃO; 13	COA; 15	FUJ; 11	CAT; 11	MNZ; Ret	28th	0

=== Complete 24 Hours of Le Mans results ===
Year	Team	Co-Drivers	Car	Class	Laps	Pos.	Class Pos.
2024	(United Kingdom) TF Sport	(France) Sébastien Baud (Japan) Hiroshi Koizumi	Chevrolet Corvette Z06 GT3.R	LMGT3	278	38th	11th
2025	(United Kingdom) TF Sport	(United Kingdom) Jonny Edgar (United States) Ben Keating	Chevrolet Corvette Z06 GT3.R	LMGT3	339	39th	7th
2026	(South Korea) Genesis Magma Racing	(France) Paul-Loup Chatin (France) Mathieu Jaminet	Genesis GMR-001	Hypercar	372	13th	13th

=== Complete European Le Mans Series results ===
Year	Entrant	Class	Chassis	Engine	1	2	3	4	5	6	Rank	Points
2025	IDEC Sport	LMP2	Oreca 07	Gibson GK428 4.2 L V8	CAT; 1	LEC; 1	IMO; 11	SPA; 11	SIL; 1	ALG; 3	3rd	90

Sporting positions
Preceded by Roberto Merhi	Formula 3 Euro Series; Champion; 2012	Succeeded by None (Series ended)
Preceded by Ivan Capelli (1984)	FIA Formula 3 European Championship; Champion; 2012	Succeeded by Raffaele Marciello
Preceded by Edoardo Mortara	Macau Grand Prix; Winner; 2011	Succeeded by António Félix da Costa
Preceded by Felix Rosenqvist	Masters of Formula 3 Winner; 2012	Succeeded by Felix Rosenqvist
Preceded by Alessandro Pier Guidi; Nicklas Nielsen; Côme Ledogar	GT World Challenge Europe Endurance Cup; Champion; 2022; With: Raffaele Marciello & Jules Gounon	Succeeded by Raffaele Marciello; Jules Gounon; Timur Boguslavskiy
Preceded by Côme Ledogar; Alessandro Pier Guidi	Intercontinental GT Challenge; Champion; 2022	Succeeded by Jules Gounon
Preceded by Davide Rigon; Daniel Serra	Michelin Endurance Cup; GTD Pro Champion; 2023; With: Jules Gounon	Succeeded by Bryan Sellers; Madison Snow; Neil Verhagen
