= Doru Sechelariu =

Romanian racing driver

- Nationality: (Romania) Romanian
- Born: Doru-Sirius Sechelariu; 19 November 1992 (age 33) Bacău (Romania)

Previous series
- 2010 2009 2008–09 2008 2007 2006–07: GP3 Series; European F3 Open; Formula BMW Europe; Formula BMW Pacific; Formula BMW UK; Formula Renault 1.6 Belgium

Doru-Sirius Sechelariu (born 19 November 1992 in Bacău, Romania) is a Romanian racecar driver. He is the son of Dumitru Sechelariu, who was the mayor of Bacău from 1996 to 2004.

== Career ==
=== Karting ===
Sechelariu began his motorsport career in karting back in 2002, winning in the Mini class of the FRAK Cup. In 2005, he finished 15th in the ICA Junior class of the Italian championship.

=== Formula Renault ===
Sechelariu moved into single-seaters in 2006, competing in Formula Renault 1.6 Belgium for Thierry Boutsen Racing. After two races at the end of the 2006 season, he moved up to the Belgian series for the 2007 season, with the same team. He finished in sixth place in the standings.

=== Formula BMW ===
In 2007, Sechelariu participated in six races of the Formula BMW UK championship with Räikkönen Robertson Racing. He finished in 22nd place in the standings with 42 points.

The following season, Sechelariu competed in the new Formula BMW Europe series for Fortec Motorsport. He finished fifteenth in the standings, taking nine points-scoring positions in sixteen races. Also, he briefly participated in the Americas and Pacific series, taking two wins at the Singapore Street Circuit in the latter.

For 2009, Sechelariu remained in the series, but switched to FMS International. He again changed team to Motaworld Racing after Coloni took full control of the FMS International from Valencia onwards. At the final two rounds at Spa and Monza, Sechelariu drove for Eifelland Racing. He finished fourteenth behind Swedish rookie Timmy Hansen in the championship.

=== GP3 Series ===
In 2010, Sechelariu became the first driver to join Tech 1 Racing for the 2010 GP3 Series season. He finished 29th in the standings, with no points and a best finish of ninth. Sechelariu was set to remain with Tech 1 Racing for the 2011 season, but a lack of funding forced him to leave the championship.

== Personal life ==
Sechelariu's hobbies are skiing, basketball, tennis, and his favourite circuit is the Circuit de Spa-Francorchamps. His favourite drivers are Fernando Alonso and Giancarlo Fisichella.

== Racing record ==
=== Career summary ===
Season	Series	Team	Races	Wins	Poles	F/Laps	Podiums	Points	Position
2006	Formula Renault 1.6 Belgium	Thierry Boutsen Racing	2	0	0	0	0	0	NC
2007	Formula Renault 1.6 Belgium	Boutsen Energy Racing	12	1	0	2	2	127	6th
2007	Formula BMW UK	Räikkönen Robertson Racing	6	0	0	0	0	42	22nd
2007	Formula BMW World Final	Fortec Motorsport	1	0	0	0	0	N/A	21st
2008	Formula BMW Europe	Fortec Motorsport	16	0	0	0	0	64	15th
2008	Formula BMW Pacific	Team Meritus	4	2	2	1	2	0	NC†
2008	Formula BMW Americas	Team Autotecnica	2	0	0	0	1	0	NC†
2008	Formula BMW World Final	EuroInternational	1	0	0	0	0	N/A	15th
2009	Formula BMW Europe	FMS International	10	0	0	0	0	69	14th
2009	Formula BMW Europe	Motaworld Racing	2	0	0	0	0	69	14th
2009	Formula BMW Europe	Eifelland Racing	4	0	0	0	1	69	14th
2009	European F3 Open	emiliodevillota.com	4	0	0	0	0	14	16th
2010	GP3 Series	Tech 1 Racing	16	0	0	0	0	0	29th

^{†} As Sechelariu was a guest driver, he was ineligible to score points.

=== Complete GP3 Series results ===
(key) (Races in bold indicate pole position) (Races in italics indicate fastest lap)

Year	Entrant	1	2	3	4	5	6	7	8	9	10	11	12	13	14	15	16	DC	Points
2010	Tech 1 Racing	CAT; FEA; 22	CAT; SPR; Ret	IST; FEA; 9	IST; SPR; 9	VAL; FEA; Ret	VAL; SPR; 20	SIL; FEA; Ret	SIL; SPR; 17	HOC; FEA; 10	HOC; SPR; DSQ	HUN; FEA; 14	HUN; SPR; 21	SPA; FEA; Ret	SPA; SPR; 20	MNZ; FEA; 21	MNZ; SPR; 18	29th	0
