= Tech 1 Racing =

French racing team

(France) Tech 1 Racing
- Founded: 2000
- Founder(s): Simon Abadie; Sarah Abadie
- Folded: 2024
- Base: Toulouse, France
- Team principal(s): Simon Abadie; Sarah Abadie
- Former series: French Formula Renault 2.0; GP3 Series; Eurocup Mégane Trophy; Formula Renault 2.0 Alps; Formula Renault 3.5 Series; Eurocup Formula Renault 2.0; Formula Renault 2.0 NEC; European Le Mans Series; GT World Challenge Europe Endurance Cup; GT World Challenge Europe Sprint Cup; FIA World Endurance Championship
- Teams' Championships: Eurocup Mégane Trophy: 2006, 2007, 2008; Formula Renault 3.5 Series: 2007, 2008, 2010, 2012; Eurocup Formula Renault 2.0: 2010, 2013; Formula Renault 2.0 Alps: 2011, 2013
- Drivers' Championships: Formula Renault 3.5 Series: 2007: Álvaro Parente; Eurocup Mégane Trophy: 2007: Pedro Petiz; Formula Renault 2.0 Alps: 2011: Javier Tarancón; Eurocup Formula Renault 2.0: 2013: Pierre Gasly
- Website: http://www.tech1racing.fr/en

Tech 1 Racing was a racing team based in Toulouse, France. Founded in 2000 by racing driver Simon Abadie and his sister Sarah, it has garnered success in the World Series by Renault, the Eurocup Mégane Trophy and the GP3 Series, most notably winning the 2007 Formula Renault 3.5 Series with Álvaro Parente.

More recently, Tech 1 operated the racing programmes of Panis Racing and its predecessor Panis Barthez Compétition from 2016 to 2023. These included entry to the European Le Mans Series and Asian Le Mans Series's LMP2 class, as well as the GT World Challenge Europe, where they ran a Lexus RC F GT3. Ultimate, a small outfit owned by brothers Jean-Baptiste and Matthieu Lahaye, also partnered Tech 1 for their LMP2 efforts in the ELMS in 2021 and the FIA World Endurance Championship in 2022.

The team closed its doors at the beginning of 2024.

== Career ==
=== French Formula Renault 2.0 ===
The team was founded in 2000 by French racing driver Simon Abadie. They joined the French Formula Renault 2.0 championship the same year, with Abadie finishing as runner-up in the standings. They also finished as runner-up in the series in 2003 before leaving the championship at the end of the 2005 season.

=== Eurocup Mégane Trophy ===
In 2005, Tech 1 joined the newly formed Eurocup Mégane Trophy, with Matthieu Lahaye and Simon Abadie finishing ninth and tenth respectively in the championship. The following year they finished second in the Drivers' championship with Lahaye and also claimed the Teams' title, the first of three consecutive Teams' championships. In 2007, they claimed a one-two finish in the drivers' championship, with Portuguese driver Pedro Petiz taking the title ahead of team-mate Dimitri Enjalbert.

=== World Series by Renault ===
2006 saw Tech 1 Racing join the World Series by Renault championship with drivers Jérôme d'Ambrosio and Ryo Fukuda. Tech 1 took over Saulnier Racing's single-seater racing structure and equipment. After a steady first season the team finished twelfth in the Teams' standings, with Fukuda taking their best race result of fourth place at both Donington Park and Le Mans.

In 2007 the team fielded former British Formula 3 champion Álvaro Parente and Frenchman Julien Jousse. Parente took two victories during the season (at Monaco and Spa-Francorchamps) to claim the title ahead of Ben Hanley, with Jousse finishing in tenth position. Tech 1 also secured the Teams' title, ahead of International DracoRacing and Carlin Motorsport.

Jousse remained with the team for the 2008 season, where he was joined by Formula Renault graduate Charles Pic. After taking six podium places – including a win at Barcelona – Jousse finished second in the championship behind Giedo van der Garde, whilst Pic took wins at Monaco and Le Mans to finish in sixth place. The team also won their second consecutive Teams' title.

Pairing the drivers Daniel Ricciardo and Brendon Hartley at the start of the season (the latter would be replaced by 2010 British Formula 3 season champion Jean-Éric Vergne), Tech 1 secured the 2010 season title.

The team claimed just one more team title in 2012 season, with Jules Bianchi finishing vice-champion in the standings, before withdrawing from the sport three seasons later.

== Results ==
=== Eurocup Formula Renault 2.0 ===
Year	Car	Drivers	Races	Wins	Poles	Fast laps	Points	D.C.	T.C.
2010	Barazi-Epsilon FR2.0-10	(France) Arthur Pic	16	4	7	4	123	**3rd**	**1st**
2010	Barazi-Epsilon FR2.0-10	(France) Hugo Valente	16	0	0	0	28	12th	**1st**
2010	Barazi-Epsilon FR2.0-10	(Finland) Aaro Vainio	16	0	2	2	101	4th	**1st**
2010	Barazi-Epsilon FR2.0-10	(Spain) Carlos Sainz, Jr.	4	0	0	2	0	NC (Note: Guest driver (ineligible for points).)	**1st**
2011	Barazi-Epsilon FR2.0-10	(Spain) Javier Tarancón	14	1	0	2	78	8th	4th
2011	Barazi-Epsilon FR2.0-10	(France) Paul-Loup Chatin	14	1	1	0	75	9th	4th
2011	Barazi-Epsilon FR2.0-10	(France) Grégoire Demoustier	4	0	0	0	0	41st	4th
2011	Barazi-Epsilon FR2.0-10	(Australia) Mitchell Gilbert	2	0	0	0	0	30th	4th
2011	Barazi-Epsilon FR2.0-10	(Finland) Miki Weckström	14	0	0	0	11	18th	4th
2012	Barazi-Epsilon FR2.0-10	(France) Paul-Loup Chatin	14	0	0	1	77	6th	4th
2012	Barazi-Epsilon FR2.0-10	(France) Matthieu Vaxivière	14	0	0	0	1	29th	4th
2012	Barazi-Epsilon FR2.0-10	(Colombia) Óscar Tunjo	14	1	1	0	73	7th	4th
2012	Barazi-Epsilon FR2.0-10	(Russia) Roman Mavlanov	14	0	0	0	0	33rd	4th
2012	Barazi-Epsilon FR2.0-10	(Brazil) Felipe Fraga	8	0	0	0	21	18th	4th
2013	Barazi-Epsilon FR2.0-10	(France) Pierre Gasly	14	3	4	2	195	**1st**	**1st**
2013	Barazi-Epsilon FR2.0-10	(Russia) Egor Orudzhev	14	0	0	0	78	7th	**1st**
2013	Barazi-Epsilon FR2.0-10	(France) Matthieu Vaxivière	14	2	2	2	57	10th	**1st**
2014	Tatuus FR 2.0-13	(France) Anthoine Hubert	14	0	0	0	30	15th	8th
2014	Tatuus FR 2.0-13	(Russia) Vasily Romanov	10	0	0	0	0	25th	8th
2014	Tatuus FR 2.0-13	(United Kingdom) George Russell	4	1	0	0	0	NC	8th
2014	Tatuus FR 2.0-13	(Russia) Egor Orudzhev	14	0	0	3	83	8th	8th
2014	Tatuus FR 2.0-13	(Canada) Luke Chudleigh	6	0	0	0	0	NC	8th
2014	Tatuus FR 2.0-13	(Switzerland) Hugo de Sadeleer	2	0	0	0	0	NC	8th
2014	Tatuus FR 2.0-13	(Malaysia) Akash Nandy	2	0	0	0	0	NC	8th
2014	Tatuus FR 2.0-13	(Indonesia) Philo Paz Armand	4	0	0	0	0	NC	8th
2015	Renault FR 2.0-10	(Switzerland) Hugo de Sadeleer	17	0	0	0	0	24th	5th
2015	Renault FR 2.0-10	(France) Simon Gachet	17	0	0	1	19	16th	5th
2015	Renault FR 2.0-10	(France) Anthoine Hubert	17	2	2	2	172	5th	5th
2016	Renault FR 2.0-10	(France) Dorian Boccolacci	15	2	1	3	200	**2nd**	**2nd**
2016	Renault FR 2.0-10	(Switzerland) Hugo de Sadeleer	15	1	0	0	89	6th	**2nd**
2016	Renault FR 2.0-10	(France) Sacha Fenestraz	15	2	2	1	119.5	5th	**2nd**
2016	Renault FR 2.0-10	(France) Gabriel Aubry	15	0	0	0	35	12th	**2nd**
2017	Renault FR 2.0-10	(France) Gabriel Aubry	13	2	2	1	128	5th	**3rd**
2017	Renault FR 2.0-10	(United Kingdom) Max Fewtrell	13	0	0	0	72	7th	**3rd**
2017	Renault FR 2.0-10	(Australia) Thomas Maxwell	13	0	0	0	14	14th	**3rd**
2017	Renault FR 2.0-10	(France) Thomas Neubauer	13	0	0	0	0	25th	**3rd**

=== Formula Renault 2.0 NEC ===
Year	Car	Drivers	Races	Wins	Poles	Fast laps	Points	D.C.	T.C.
2016	Renault FR 2.0-10	(France) Dorian Boccolacci	15	1	0	0	226	**3rd**	**3rd**
2016	Renault FR 2.0-10	(Switzerland) Hugo de Sadeleer	15	0	0	2	162	9th	**3rd**
2016	Renault FR 2.0-10	(France) Sacha Fenestraz	15	1	1	0	207	5th	**3rd**
2016	Renault FR 2.0-10	(France) Gabriel Aubry	9	0	0	0	76	18th	**3rd**
2017	Renault FR 2.0-10	(France) Gabriel Aubry	9	2	2	2	115	5th	4th
2017	Renault FR 2.0-10	(France) Thomas Neubauer	9	0	0	0	52	11th	4th
2017	Renault FR 2.0-10	(United Kingdom) Max Fewtrell	5	0	0	0	48	12th	4th
2017	Renault FR 2.0-10	(Australia) Thomas Maxwell	7	0	0	0	36	17th	4th

=== Formula Renault 3.5 Series ===
Year	Car	Drivers	Races	Wins	Poles	Fast laps	Points	D.C.	T.C.
2006	Dallara T05-Renault	(Japan) Ryō Fukuda	17	0	0	0	25	16th	12th
2006	Dallara T05-Renault	(France) Patrick Pilet	6	0	0	0	14 (Note: Includes points scored for other teams.)	21st	12th
2006	Dallara T05-Renault	(Italy) Marco Bonanomi	4	0	0	0	5	31st	12th
2006	Dallara T05-Renault	(Belgium) Jérôme d'Ambrosio	7	0	0	0	0	36th	12th
2007	Dallara T05-Renault	(Portugal) Álvaro Parente	17	2	2	1	129	**1st**	**1st**
2007	Dallara T05-Renault	(France) Julien Jousse	17	0	1	1	62	10th	**1st**
2008	Dallara T08-Renault	(France) Julien Jousse	17	1	0	2	106	**2nd**	**1st**
2008	Dallara T08-Renault	(France) Charles Pic	17	2	1	2	69	6th	**1st**
2009	Dallara T08-Renault	(New Zealand) Brendon Hartley	13	0	1	3	26	15th	4th
2009	Dallara T08-Renault	(Italy) Edoardo Mortara	2	0	0	0	6	24th	4th
2009	Dallara T08-Renault	(Australia) Daniel Ricciardo	2	0	0	0	0	34th	4th
2009	Dallara T08-Renault	(France) Charles Pic	17	2	2	3	94	**3rd**	4th
2010	Dallara T08-Renault	(Australia) Daniel Ricciardo	17	4	8	5	136	**2nd**	**1st**
2010	Dallara T08-Renault	(France) Jean-Éric Vergne	6	1	0	0	53	8th	**1st**
2010	Dallara T08-Renault	(New Zealand) Brendon Hartley	13	0	0	2	50	10th	**1st**
2011	Dallara T08-Renault	(Estonia) Kevin Korjus	17	3	0	1	120	6th	6th
2011	Dallara T08-Renault	(France) Arthur Pic	17	1	0	0	16	23rd	6th
2012	Dallara T12-Zytek	(France) Jules Bianchi	17	3	5	7	185	**2nd**	**1st**
2012	Dallara T12-Zytek	(Estonia) Kevin Korjus	16	0	0	0	69	10th	**1st**
2012	Dallara T12-Zytek	(Germany) Daniel Abt	6	0	0	0	0	34th	**1st**
2013	Dallara T12-Zytek	(Netherlands) Nigel Melker	17	0	0	2	136	6th	5th
2013	Dallara T12-Zytek	(Russia) Mikhail Aleshin	17	0	0	0	33	12th	5th
2014	Dallara T12-Zytek	(Denmark) Marco Sørensen	17	0	0	0	44	12th	9th
2014	Dallara T12-Zytek	(Canada) Nicholas Latifi	6	0	0	0	20	20th	9th
2014	Dallara T12-Zytek	(Mexico) Alfonso Celis Jr.	2	0	0	0	0	27th	9th
2015	Dallara T12-Zytek	(Israel) Roy Nissany	17	0	0	0	27	13th	7th
2015	Dallara T12-Zytek	(France) Aurélien Panis	17	0	0	0	42	12th	7th

=== GP3 ===
Year	Car	Drivers	Races	Wins	Poles	Fast laps	Points	D.C.	T.C.
2010	Dallara GP3/10-Renault	(Romania) Doru Sechelariu	16	0	0	0	0	29th	6th
2010	Dallara GP3/10-Renault	(Spain) Daniel Juncadella	10	0	0	0	10	14th	6th
2010	Dallara GP3/10-Renault	(Monaco) Stefano Coletti	14	0	0	0	18	9th	6th
2010	Dallara GP3/10-Renault	(France) Jean-Éric Vergne	4	0	0	0	9	17th	6th
2010	Dallara GP3/10-Renault	(France) Jim Pla	2	0	0	0	0	36th	6th
2011	Dallara GP3/10-Renault	(Finland) Aaro Vainio	16	0	0	0	12	15th	6th
2011	Dallara GP3/10-Renault	(Italy) Andrea Caldarelli	4	0	0	2	20	10th	6th
2011	Dallara GP3/10-Renault	(Netherlands) Thomas Hylkema	12	0	0	0	0	34th	6th
2011	Dallara GP3/10-Renault	(Hungary) Tamás Pál Kiss	16	1	0	0	11	16th	6th

==== In detail ====
(key) (Races in bold indicate pole position) (Races in italics indicate fastest lap)

Year	Chassis Engine Tyres	Drivers	1	2	3	4	5	6	7	8	9	10	11	12	13	14	15	16	T.C.	Points
2010	GP3/10; Renault; **P**		CAT; FEA	CAT; SPR	IST; FEA	IST; SPR	VAL; FEA	VAL; SPR	SIL; FEA	SIL; SPR	HOC; FEA	HOC; SPR	HUN; FEA	HUN; SPR	SPA; FEA	SPA; SPR	MNZ; FEA	MNZ; SPR	6th	36
2010	GP3/10; Renault; **P**	(Romania) Doru Sechelariu	22	Ret	9	9	Ret	20	Ret	17	10	DSQ	14	21	Ret	20	21	18	6th	36
2010	GP3/10; Renault; **P**	(Spain) Daniel Juncadella	11	11															6th	36
2010	GP3/10; Renault; **P**	(Monaco) Stefano Coletti			24^{†}	14	10	6	10	Ret	5	3	3	4	Ret	24	16	20	6th	36
2010	GP3/10; Renault; **P**	(France) Jean-Éric Vergne	5	21			4	17											6th	36
2010	GP3/10; Renault; **P**	(France) Jim Pla			Ret	20													6th	36
2010	GP3/10; Renault; **P**	(Spain) Daniel Juncadella							Ret	Ret	8	2			5	DSQ	22	Ret	6th	36
2011	GP3/10; Renault; **P**		IST; FEA	IST; SPR	CAT; FEA	CAT; SPR	VAL; FEA	VAL; SPR	SIL; FEA	SIL; SPR	NÜR; FEA	NÜR; SPR	HUN; FEA	HUN; SPR	SPA; FEA	SPA; SPR	MNZ; FEA	MNZ; SPR	6th	43
2011	GP3/10; Renault; **P**	(Finland) Aaro Vainio	15	Ret	3	20	Ret	Ret	11	18	7	13	5	7	13	Ret	22^{†}	8	6th	43
2011	GP3/10; Renault; **P**	(Italy) Andrea Caldarelli	2	5	4	4													6th	43
2011	GP3/10; Renault; **P**	(Netherlands) Thomas Hylkema					Ret	Ret	20	21	18	24^{†}	27	Ret	22	21	14	Ret	6th	43
2011	GP3/10; Renault; **P**	(Hungary) Tamás Pál Kiss	16	18	8	1	16	13	Ret	20	8	4	10	20	17	14	Ret	12	6th	43

=== 24 Hours of Le Mans ===
Year	Entrant	No.	Car	Drivers	Class	Laps	Pos.	Class Pos.
2016	(France) Panis Barthez Compétition	23	Ligier JS P2-Nissan	(France) Fabien Barthez (France) Timothé Buret (France) Paul-Loup Chatin	LMP2	347	12th	8th
2017	(France) Panis Barthez Compétition	23	Ligier JS P217-Gibson	(France) Fabien Barthez (France) Nathanaël Berthon (France) Timothé Buret	LMP2	296	DNF	DNF
2018	(France) Panis Barthez Compétition	23	Ligier JS P217-Gibson	(France) Timothé Buret (France) Julien Canal (United Kingdom) Will Stevens	LMP2	352	13th	9th
2019	(France) Panis Barthez Compétition	23	Ligier JS P217-Gibson	(Austria) René Binder (France) Julien Canal (United Kingdom) Will Stevens	LMP2	362	13th	8th
2020	(France) Panis Racing	31	Oreca 07-Gibson	(France) Julien Canal (France) Nico Jamin (France) Matthieu Vaxivière	LMP2	368	7th	**3rd**
2021	(United States) PR1 Motorsports Mathiasen	24	Oreca 07-Gibson	(France) Gabriel Aubry (United States) Patrick Kelly (Switzerland) Simon Trummer	LMP2 (Pro-Am)	261	DNF	DNF
2021	(France) Panis Racing	65	Oreca 07-Gibson	(Australia) James Allen (France) Julien Canal (United Kingdom) Will Stevens	LMP2	362	8th	**3rd**
2022	(France) Ultimate	35	Oreca 07-Gibson	(France) Jean-Baptiste Lahaye (France) Matthieu Lahaye (France) François Hériau	LMP2 (Pro-Am)	335	48th	8th
2022	(France) Panis Racing	65	Oreca 07-Gibson	(France) Julien Canal (France) Nico Jamin (Netherlands) Job van Uitert	LMP2	366	16th	12th
2023	(France) Panis Racing	65	Oreca 07-Gibson	(Netherlands) Tijmen van der Helm (Venezuela) Manuel Maldonado (Netherlands) Job van Uitert	LMP2	316	25th	14th

== Timeline ==
Former series
French Formula Renault Championship	2000–2005
Formula Renault 2000 Eurocup	2001, 2003-2004
Eurocup Mégane Trophy	2005-2009
Formula Renault 3.5 Series	2006–2015
GP3 Series	2010–2011
Eurocup Formula Renault 2.0	2010–2018
Formula Renault 2.0 Alps	2011–2015
Formula Renault 2.0 NEC	2016–2018
European Le Mans Series	2016–2023
GT World Challenge Europe Endurance Cup	2019–2020
GT World Challenge Europe Sprint Cup	2019–2020
FIA World Endurance Championship	2022

== Notes ==
Achievements
Preceded by Azerti Motorsport	Eurocup Mégane Trophy Teams' Champion; 2006-2008	Succeeded by TDS Racing
Preceded by Interwetten Racing	Formula Renault 3.5 Series Teams' Champion; 2007-2008	Succeeded by Draco Racing
Preceded by Draco Racing	Formula Renault 3.5 Series Teams' Champion; 2010	Succeeded by Carlin
Preceded by Epsilon Euskadi	Eurocup Formula Renault 2.0 Teams' Champion; 2010	Succeeded by Koiranen GP
Preceded by none	Formula Renault 2.0 Alps Teams' Champion; 2011-2012	Succeeded by Prema Powerteam
Preceded by Carlin	Formula Renault 3.5 Series Teams' Champion; 2012	Succeeded by DAMS
Preceded by Josef Kaufmann Racing	Eurocup Formula Renault 2.0 Teams' Champion; 2013	Succeeded by Koiranen GP
