= 2007 Formula BMW UK season =

Seasons
- ← 2006 none →

The 2007 Formula BMW UK season was the fourth and final Formula BMW season based in United Kingdom whose mission was to develop talented young drivers and introduce them to auto racing using full-size cars. The series was part of the support race package for the BTCC.

== Teams and drivers ==
All teams were British-registered.

Team	No	Driver	Class	Rounds
Fortec Motorsport	1	(United Kingdom) Henry Arundel		All
Fortec Motorsport	2	(Sweden) Marcus Ericsson	R	All
Fortec Motorsport	3	(United Kingdom) Daniel McKenzie		All
Fortec Motorsport	32	(United Kingdom) Adrian Quaife-Hobbs	R	All
Nexa Racing	4	(United Kingdom) Tom Gladdis	R	All
Nexa Racing	5	(Finland) Valle Mäkelä		All
Nexa Racing	8	(Japan) Kimiya Sato		All
Nexa Racing	85	(United Kingdom) Callum Holland	R	1–3, 6, 8
Carlin Motorsport	6	(United Kingdom) Oliver Webb	R	All
Carlin Motorsport	7	(United Kingdom) Henry Surtees	R	All
Victory Engineering	9	(France) Anthony Comas		All
Räikkönen Robertson Racing	10	(New Zealand) Dominic Storey		5
Räikkönen Robertson Racing	11	(Czech Republic) Josef Král		All
Räikkönen Robertson Racing	22	(Colombia) Carlos Huertas	R	All
Räikkönen Robertson Racing	20	(Romania) Doru Sechelariu		7–9
Motaworld Racing	14	(United Kingdom) Jonathan Legris		All
Motaworld Racing	15	(United Kingdom) Adam Butler	R	1, 3–4, 8–9
Motaworld Racing	16	(United Kingdom) Matthew Bell		6, 8–9
Hyperion Motorsport	25	(United Kingdom) Michael Moyers		2, 8–9
Team Loctite	97	(United Kingdom) Rupert Svendsen-Cook	R	All
Team Loctite	98	(Australia) Sam Abay		All
Team Loctite	99	(United Kingdom) Jordan Williams		All

Icon	Class
R	Rookie Cup

== Results and standings ==
All rounds were held in United Kingdom.

=== Races ===
Round	Circuit	Date	Pole position	Fastest lap	Winning driver	Winning team
1	Brands Hatch	31 March	(Finland) Valle Mäkelä	(Czech Republic) Josef Král	(Finland) Valle Mäkelä	Nexa Racing
2	Brands Hatch	1 April	(Sweden) Marcus Ericsson	(Sweden) Marcus Ericsson	(Sweden) Marcus Ericsson	Fortec Motorsport
3	Rockingham	21 April	(United Kingdom) Adrian Quaife-Hobbs	(United Kingdom) Henry Surtees	(Czech Republic) Josef Král	Räikkönen Robertson Racing
4	Rockingham	22 April	(Czech Republic) Josef Král	(Czech Republic) Josef Král	(Czech Republic) Josef Král	Räikkönen Robertson Racing
5	Thruxton	5 May	(United Kingdom) Henry Arundel	(Japan) Kimiya Sato	(United Kingdom) Henry Arundel	Fortec Motorsport
6	Thruxton	6 May	(United Kingdom) Henry Surtees	(Czech Republic) Josef Král	(Czech Republic) Josef Král	Räikkönen Robertson Racing
7	Croft	2 June	(Japan) Kimiya Sato	(Sweden) Marcus Ericsson	(Japan) Kimiya Sato	Nexa Racing
8	Croft	3 June	(Sweden) Marcus Ericsson	(Czech Republic) Josef Král	(Czech Republic) Josef Král	Räikkönen Robertson Racing
9	Oulton Park	23 June	(Sweden) Marcus Ericsson	(Czech Republic) Josef Král	(Czech Republic) Josef Král	Räikkönen Robertson Racing
10	Oulton Park	24 June	(Sweden) Marcus Ericsson	(Finland) Valle Mäkelä	(Sweden) Marcus Ericsson	Fortec Motorsport
11	Donington Park	14 July	(Australia) Sam Abay	(Czech Republic) Josef Král	(United Kingdom) Jonathan Legris	Motaworld Racing
12	Donington Park	15 July	(Sweden) Marcus Ericsson	(United Kingdom) Jonathan Legris	(United Kingdom) Henry Surtees	Carlin Motorsport
13	Snetterton Motor Racing Circuit	28 July	(Sweden) Marcus Ericsson	(Sweden) Marcus Ericsson	(Sweden) Marcus Ericsson	Fortec Motorsport
14	Snetterton Motor Racing Circuit	29 July	(Sweden) Marcus Ericsson	(United Kingdom) Henry Surtees	(Czech Republic) Josef Král	Räikkönen Robertson Racing
15	Brands Hatch	18 August	(Sweden) Marcus Ericsson	(Sweden) Marcus Ericsson	(Sweden) Marcus Ericsson	Fortec Motorsport
16	Brands Hatch	19 August	(Sweden) Marcus Ericsson	(Sweden) Marcus Ericsson	(Sweden) Marcus Ericsson	Fortec Motorsport
17	Knockhill	1 September	(Sweden) Marcus Ericsson	(Sweden) Marcus Ericsson	(Sweden) Marcus Ericsson	Fortec Motorsport
18	Knockhill	2 September	(Sweden) Marcus Ericsson	(Sweden) Marcus Ericsson	(Sweden) Marcus Ericsson	Fortec Motorsport

=== Drivers ===
Pos	Driver	BRH		ROC		THR		CRO		OUL		DON		SNE		BRH		KNO		Pts
1	(Sweden) Marcus Ericsson	3	**1**	4	3	2	5	2	**2**	**Ret**	**1**	2	**5**	**1**	**12**	**1**	**1**	**1**	**1**	676
2	(Czech Republic) Josef Král	Ret	18	1	**1**	3	1	3	1	1	2	5	2	2	1	10	2	4	3	636
3	(United Kingdom) Henry Arundel	4	10	3	2	**1**	3	5	4	2	8	3	3	5	2	2	3	Ret	9	595
4	(Japan) Kimiya Sato	5	6	6	Ret	6	11	**1**	5	9	7	4	4	9	6	7	5	8	6	510
5	(Finland) Valle Mäkelä	**1**	3	10	10	10	10	4	9	Ret	4	8	6	4	3	3	4	13	5	509
6	(United Kingdom) Henry Surtees	2	14	2	7	5	**2**	11	3	3	DSQ	6	1	3	8	Ret	Ret	9	2	491
7	(United Kingdom) Jonathan Legris	10	2	12	4	8	4	7	7	Ret	3	1	10	14	Ret	4	6	2	7	480
8	(Australia) Sam Abay	9	9	9	9	12	7	13	8	4	13	**15**	7	8	5	9	8	7	12	429
9	(United Kingdom) Oliver Webb	7	5	7	8	7	6	Ret	13	11	9	12	13	7	Ret	5	9	10	4	406
10	(United Kingdom) Adrian Quaife-Hobbs	11	4	**11**	5	9	12	6	6	Ret	5	9	Ret	13	4	14	7	5	13	405
11	(United Kingdom) Daniel McKenzie	6	8	5	6	4	9	10	Ret	8	6	7	8	Ret	Ret	6	11	6	14	402
12	(United Kingdom) Jordan Williams	13	11	Ret	12	11	15	8	10	7	10	11	9	6	13	8	Ret	3	8	347
13	(Colombia) Carlos Huertas	14	7	8	11	13	8	9	11	6	12	10	Ret	10	9	12	10	Ret	18	336
14	(United Kingdom) Tom Gladdis	12	12	14	14	17	13	DNS	14	13	14	14	11	12	10	13	12	12	19	262
15	(France) Anthony Comas	8	13	Ret	16	15	Ret	12	Ret	10	16	Ret	12	Ret	7	11	Ret	Ret	10	202
16	(United Kingdom) Rupert Svendsen-Cook	15	15	Ret	DNS	14	16	15	12	12	15	16	Ret	11	11	Ret	Ret	Ret	16	178
17	(United Kingdom) Adam Butler	16	16			18	17	14	15							15	13	15	20	102
18	(United Kingdom) Matthew Bell											13	14			16	16	11	11	90
19	(United Kingdom) Callum Holland	17	17	15	15	16	14					Ret	15			Ret	15			88
20	(United Kingdom) Michael Moyers			13	13											Ret	Ret	14	15	58
21	(New Zealand) Dominic Storey									5	11									52
22	(Romania) Doru Sechelariu													15	Ret	17	14	Ret	17	42
Pos	Driver	BRH		ROC		THR		CRO		OUL		DON		SNE		BRH		KNO		Pts

Pole positions highlighted in bold(= 1 point)
