= 2010 GP3 Series =

Season of motor racing competitions

The 2010 GP3 Series season was the first season of the GP3 Series, a feeder series for the GP2 Series. The championship was contested over sixteen races held at eight rounds, beginning on 8 May at Circuit de Catalunya and ending on 12 September at Autodromo Nazionale Monza. Ten teams were announced, running three cars each.

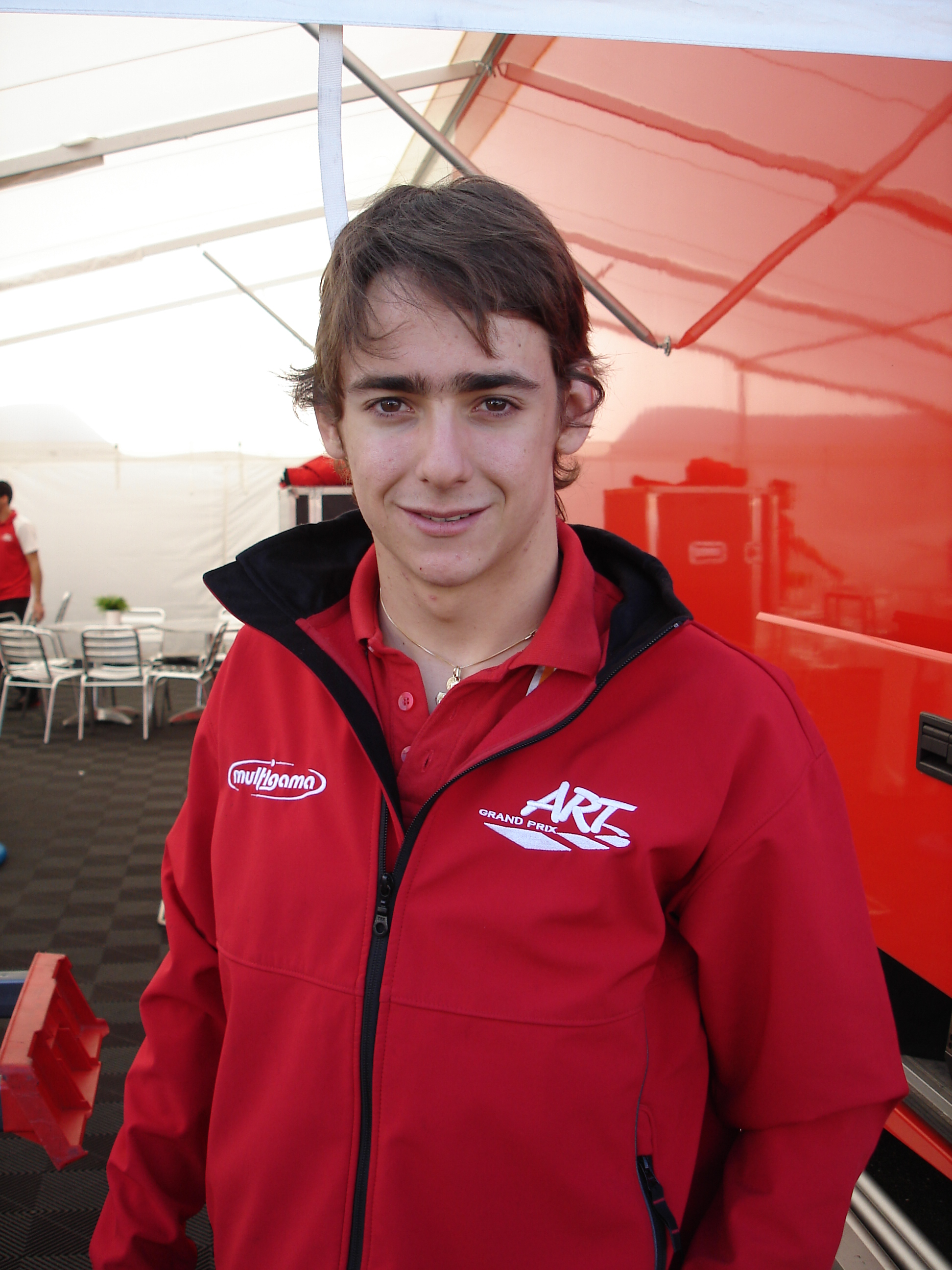
Esteban Gutiérrez (pictured in 2009), won the drivers' championship

The inaugural title was claimed by ART Grand Prix driver Esteban Gutiérrez, having taken the final pole position of the season at Monza to put him out of reach of title rival Robert Wickens. Gutiérrez took five race wins during the season, four of which coming in the higher points-rewarding races held on Saturdays. He also took four further podium finishes en route to a 17-point championship win over Wickens. Wickens eventually ended the season with three victories at Hockenheim, Spa-Francorchamps – despite spinning in wet conditions and damaging the nose of his Status Grand Prix car against the pit wall – and Monza, as well as four second-place finishes, two of which being behind Gutiérrez.

Nico Müller finished in third position for Jenzer Motorsport, taking victories in Valencia and at the Hungaroring. He finished 15 points clear of Gutiérrez's team-mate Alexander Rossi, who took wins from pole position in the sprint races in Barcelona and at the Hungaroring. Rio Haryanto was fifth for Manor Racing, winning in Istanbul from a reverse-grid pole position. Other victories were taken by Status Grand Prix's Daniel Morad at Silverstone, Pål Varhaug won the season-opening race in Barcelona and Adrien Tambay won from 27th on the grid at Spa in a wet/dry race. ART Grand Prix also claimed the teams' championship, having done so at Spa-Francorchamps, finishing 44 points clear of nearest challengers Status Grand Prix, while Jenzer Motorsport finished in third position ahead of Manor Racing.

The points system for the first race of the weekend was as follows: 10-8-6-5-4-3-2-1 points awarded to the top eight finishers, 2 extra points for the driver who secured pole position, and 1 extra point for the driver who set the fastest race lap—provided that driver finished within the top ten.

The points system for the second race of the weekend was as follows: 6-5-4-3-2-1 points awarded to the top six finishers, and 1 extra point for the driver who set the fastest race lap—provided that driver finished within the top ten.

The top eight starting positions on the grid for the second race of the weekend were determined by reversing the finishing order of the top eight drivers from the first race of the weekend. From the ninth position onwards, the grid was determined by the finishing order from the first race of the weekend.

== Teams and drivers ==
For the first two tests of the season, teams were given numbers in relation to alphabetical order. Thus, Addax were given 1, 2 and 3, with ART receiving 4, 5 and 6, and so forth. However, a "qualifying" session was held at Circuit Paul Ricard on 1 April 2010, where Alexander Rossi ended quickest. With this, ART ran cars 1, 2 and 3 during the season.

Team	No.	Driver name	Rounds
(France) ART Grand Prix	1	(United States) Alexander Rossi	All
(France) ART Grand Prix	2	(Mexico) Esteban Gutiérrez	All
(France) ART Grand Prix	3	(Brazil) Pedro Nunes	All
(Republic of Ireland) Status Grand Prix (Note: Status Grand Prix competed under a Ireland license.)	4	(Canada) Robert Wickens	All
(Republic of Ireland) Status Grand Prix	5	(Russia) Ivan Lukashevich	All
(Republic of Ireland) Status Grand Prix	6	(Canada) Daniel Morad	All
(United Kingdom) Manor Racing	7	(United Kingdom) James Jakes	1–5, 8
(United Kingdom) Manor Racing	7	(France) Adrien Tambay	6–7
(United Kingdom) Manor Racing	8	(Indonesia) Rio Haryanto	All
(United Kingdom) Manor Racing	9	(United Kingdom) Adrian Quaife-Hobbs	All
(Germany) RSC Mücke Motorsport	10	(Netherlands) Nigel Melker	All
(Germany) RSC Mücke Motorsport	11	(Netherlands) Renger van der Zande	All
(Germany) RSC Mücke Motorsport	12	(Germany) Tobias Hegewald	All
(United Kingdom) Carlin	14	(United States) Josef Newgarden	All
(United Kingdom) Carlin	15	(United Kingdom) Dean Smith	All
(United Kingdom) Carlin	16	(Brazil) Lucas Foresti	1, 3–5, 8
(United Kingdom) Carlin	16	(Russia) Mikhail Aleshin	2
(United Kingdom) Carlin	16	(Portugal) António Félix da Costa	6–7
(Spain) Addax Team	17	(Brazil) Felipe Guimarães	All
(Spain) Addax Team	18	(Mexico) Pablo Sánchez López	All
(Spain) Addax Team	19	(Italy) Mirko Bortolotti	All
(Australia) MW Arden (Note: Arden International competed under a Australia license.)	20	(Denmark) Michael Christensen	All
(Australia) MW Arden	21	(Spain) Miki Monrás	All
(Australia) MW Arden	22	(Brazil) Leonardo Cordeiro	All
(Switzerland) Jenzer Motorsport	23	(Norway) Pål Varhaug	All
(Switzerland) Jenzer Motorsport	24	(Switzerland) Simon Trummer	1–5, 7–8
(Switzerland) Jenzer Motorsport	24	(Spain) Marco Barba	6
(Switzerland) Jenzer Motorsport	25	(Switzerland) Nico Müller	All
(France) Tech 1 Racing	26	(Romania) Doru Sechelariu	All
(France) Tech 1 Racing	27	(Spain) Daniel Juncadella	1
(France) Tech 1 Racing	27	(Monaco) Stefano Coletti	2–8
(France) Tech 1 Racing	28	(France) Jean-Éric Vergne	1, 3
(France) Tech 1 Racing	28	(France) Jim Pla	2
(France) Tech 1 Racing	28	(Spain) Daniel Juncadella	4–5, 7–8
(United Kingdom) Atech CRS GP	29	(Italy) Patrick Reiterer	1–2
(United Kingdom) Atech CRS GP	29	(Spain) Roberto Merhi	3–8
(United Kingdom) Atech CRS GP	30	(United Kingdom) Oliver Oakes	All
(United Kingdom) Atech CRS GP	31	(Italy) Vittorio Ghirelli	All

ART Grand Prix signed Esteban Gutiérrez, who drove for the team in the 2009 Formula 3 Euro Series. He was joined by Pedro Nunes, who drove in the same series for Manor Motorsport, and former ISR Racing International Formula Master driver Alexander Rossi.

After missing the 2009 racing season, Ivan Lukashevich drove for the Status Grand Prix team. He was joined by the Canadian pairing of Formula Two runner-up Robert Wickens and former Formula BMW USA champion Daniel Morad, who did not have a drive in 2009.

After a podium in the 2009–10 GP2 Asia Series in Abu Dhabi, James Jakes joined Manor Racing. He was joined by Rio Haryanto, the 2009 Formula BMW Pacific champion, and Adrian Quaife-Hobbs, who abandoned his campaign in the Formula 3 Euro Series. Jakes was injured at Hockenheim and was replaced by Auto GP driver Adrien Tambay in Hungary and Belgium. Jakes returned for the season finale at Monza.

Nigel Melker, who drove for MP Motorsport in the 2009 Formula Renault Eurocup signed to drive for RSC Mücke Motorsport. Melker was joined by Renger van der Zande, who finished third in the 2009 British Formula 3 Championship. The third driver at the team was Tobias Hegewald, who moves from Formula Two.

Carlin signed British Formula Renault champion Dean Smith and British Formula Ford runner-up Josef Newgarden to drive full-time for the team. Lucas Foresti, one of the team's current British Formula 3 drivers raced for the team in selected rounds of the series. Foresti missed the Turkish round due to prior British Formula 3 commitments, and was replaced by one of the team's Formula Renault 3.5 drivers, Mikhail Aleshin. Foresti returned for the rounds from Valencia onwards, but would miss the rounds in Hungary and Belgium due to British Formula 3 racing at Spa and Snetterton. Formula 3 Euro Series driver António Félix da Costa stepped in to replace Foresti in Hungary and Belgium.

Pablo Sánchez López stepped up from Italian Formula Three to compete for the Addax Team. Mirko Bortolotti moved across from Formula Two to partner Sánchez López, while Felipe Guimarães completed the team, having contested selected races in Indy Lights.

Michael Christensen, who raced in the 2009 Formula BMW Europe season for Mücke Motorsport, joined MW Arden. Christensen was joined by Miki Monrás, who was fifth in the Formula Renault Eurocup, and Leonardo Cordeiro, the 2009 Formula Three Sudamericana champion.

Simon Trummer, who raced in 2009 in International Formula Master driver for Iris Project, joined Jenzer Motorsport. He was joined by Pål Varhaug, who raced for Jenzer in Formula Master in 2009, and Nico Müller, who raced for Jenzer in the Formula Renault Eurocup and was champion in the Swiss Formula Renault 2.0 series. Trummer was injured at Hockenheim and was replaced by European F3 Open championship leader Marco Barba in Hungary. Trummer returned at Spa.

Doru Sechelariu, 2009 Formula BMW Europe driver for Eifelland Racing drove for Tech 1 Racing. He was joined in Barcelona by two drivers who were dovetailing GP3 commitments with other series. Daniel Juncadella contested the first round at Barcelona, but his main focus was a campaign in the Formula 3 Euro Series. Stefano Coletti combined his Formula Renault 3.5 programme with his GP3 commitments, replacing Juncadella from Turkey onwards. Jean-Éric Vergne's main focus was to win the British Formula 3 Championship, and with Vergne racing at Hockenheim in British Formula 3, he was replaced by ART Grand Prix Formula 3 Euro Series driver Jim Pla in Turkey. Vergne returned for Valencia, but was replaced by Juncadella for Silverstone, as he signed a deal to complete the season in GP3, as well as Euro Series commitments. With Juncadella missing the round in Hungary due to a guest drive in British Formula 3 at Spa, Tech 1 had wished to field their Eurocup Formula Renault driver Arthur Pic at the meeting. However, they fielded just two cars, as they have used up their allotment of five drivers for the season, and did not receive total approval from the other teams for Pic to drive. Juncadella returned at Spa.

Atech CRS GP signed Formula Master graduate Patrick Reiterer and former British Formula 3 racer Oliver Oakes to drive two of their cars. The third was driven by Vittorio Ghirelli, after he stepped down from Team Ghinzani in Italian Formula Three. Reiterer was replaced for the round in Valencia by Formula 3 Euro Series racer Roberto Merhi.

== Season ==
First ever round in GP3 Series began in Catalunya. Qualifying was won by Nigel Melker. Feature race was won by Pål Varhaug and sprint race was taken in top by American driver Alexander Rossi. In the second round, at Istanbul, Nigel Melker take again pole position for the feature race. The feature race was won by Esteban Gutiérrez, and Rio Haryanto storms to epic Race 2 victory. Third stop, was in Portimão, taking to 19–20 June, but event was cancelled along with GP2 Series. Then, the battle was reversed on Valencia, and win in Race 1 was taken by Mexican Esteban Gutiérrez, while Nico Müller dominates in Race 2. Fourth round was in Silverstone, second consecutive feature race win for Esteban Gutiérrez. Daniel Morad take victory Race 2 from 2nd on the grid. Fifth round was in Hockenheim, first race was won by Robert Wickens, while Mexican dominates in Race 2. Sixth stop was at the Hungaroring. For the first time, Esteban Gutiérrez doesn't have win in each races. First race was won by Nico Müller, and second was dominated by Alexander Rossi. In seventh stop, at Spa-Francorchamps, there was a lot of rain in first race and the race would be stopped. The winner was Robert Wickens, and in second race there was again rain, and all drivers goes to slicks, except Adrien Tambay, who won from 27th on the grid! Final round, at Monza there was only two title contenders - Esteban Gutiérrez and Robert Wickens. Mexican win in qualifying with victory in Race 1 and fastest lap. He won the title, but in second race, he crashed and the race was over for him. Robert Wickens set the victory and the fastest lap. He crashed in the pit lane, but comfortably last win of the first ever year of GP3 Series.

== The car ==
The first chassis used by the GP3 Series was the GP3/10 built by Dallara, who also produces cars in the championship's sister series GP2. It is equipped with a 6-speed paddle shift gearbox and a four-cylinder 2.0 litre (122 cu in) turbocharged engine with 280 bhp developed by Renault Sport. The chassis used tyres supplied by Pirelli, who would then go on to be the tyre supplier for Formula One and GP2 from 2011.

== 2010 Schedule ==
An eight-round calendar was announced on 18 December 2009. On 30 April 2010, it was announced that the series would increase to nine rounds, with a round in support of the Turkish Grand Prix added. With the cancellation of the round in Portimão, the calendar returned to eight rounds.

Round		Location	Circuit	Date	Supporting
1	R1	Catalunya, Spain	Circuit de Catalunya	8 May	Spanish Grand Prix
1	R2	Catalunya, Spain	Circuit de Catalunya	9 May	Spanish Grand Prix
2	R1	Istanbul, Turkey	Istanbul Racing Circuit	29 May	Turkish Grand Prix
2	R2	Istanbul, Turkey	Istanbul Racing Circuit	30 May	Turkish Grand Prix
3	R1	Valencia. Spain	Valencia Street Circuit	26 June	European Grand Prix
3	R2	Valencia. Spain	Valencia Street Circuit	27 June	European Grand Prix
4	R1	(United Kingdom) Silverstone, UK	Silverstone Circuit	10 July	British Grand Prix
4	R2	(United Kingdom) Silverstone, UK	Silverstone Circuit	11 July	British Grand Prix
5	R1	Hockenheim, Germany	Hockenheimring	24 July	German Grand Prix
5	R2	Hockenheim, Germany	Hockenheimring	25 July	German Grand Prix
6	R1	Budapest, Hungary	Hungaroring	31 July	Hungarian Grand Prix
6	R2	Budapest, Hungary	Hungaroring	1 August	Hungarian Grand Prix
7	R1	Spa, Belgium	Circuit de Spa-Francorchamps	28 August	Belgian Grand Prix
7	R2	Spa, Belgium	Circuit de Spa-Francorchamps	29 August	Belgian Grand Prix
8	R1	Monza, Italy	Autodromo Nazionale Monza	11 September	Italian Grand Prix
8	R2	Monza, Italy	Autodromo Nazionale Monza	12 September	Italian Grand Prix

The following rounds were included on the provisional calendars published by the FIA but were cancelled:

Round	Location	Circuit	Date	Supporting
R1	Portimão, Portugal	Autódromo Internacional do Algarve	19 June	GP2 Series
R2	Portimão, Portugal	Autódromo Internacional do Algarve	20 June	GP2 Series

== Results ==
Round		Circuit	Pole position	Fastest lap	Winning driver	Winning team	Report
1	R1	(Spain) Circuit de Catalunya	(Netherlands) Nigel Melker	(United Kingdom) Adrian Quaife-Hobbs (Note: Adrian Quaife-Hobbs set the fastest lap, but did not finish in the top 10, so was ineligible to be the point-scorer for the fastest lap. Miki Monrás was the point-scorer instead for setting the fastest lap of those finishing in the top 10.)	(Norway) Pål Varhaug	(Switzerland) Jenzer Motorsport	Report
1	R2	(Spain) Circuit de Catalunya		(United States) Alexander Rossi	(United States) Alexander Rossi	(France) ART Grand Prix	Report
2	R1	(Turkey) Istanbul Park	(Netherlands) Nigel Melker	(Mexico) Esteban Gutiérrez	(Mexico) Esteban Gutiérrez	(France) ART Grand Prix	Report
2	R2	(Turkey) Istanbul Park		(Canada) Robert Wickens (Note: Robert Wickens set the fastest lap, but did not finish in the top 10, so was ineligible to be the point-scorer for the fastest lap. Esteban Gutiérrez was the point-scorer instead for setting the fastest lap of those finishing in the top 10.)	(Indonesia) Rio Haryanto	(United Kingdom) Manor Racing	Report
3	R1	(Spain) Valencia Street Circuit	(Mexico) Esteban Gutiérrez	(Mexico) Esteban Gutiérrez	(Mexico) Esteban Gutiérrez	(France) ART Grand Prix	Report
3	R2	(Spain) Valencia Street Circuit		(Spain) Roberto Merhi	(Switzerland) Nico Müller	(Switzerland) Jenzer Motorsport	Report
4	R1	(United Kingdom) Silverstone Circuit	(Mexico) Esteban Gutiérrez	(Mexico) Esteban Gutiérrez	(Mexico) Esteban Gutiérrez	(France) ART Grand Prix	Report
4	R2	(United Kingdom) Silverstone Circuit		(Canada) Daniel Morad	(Canada) Daniel Morad	(Republic of Ireland) Status Grand Prix	Report
5	R1	(Germany) Hockenheimring	(United States) Josef Newgarden (Note: James Jakes recorded the fastest time in qualifying, but got a two-place penalty for disregarding yellow flags. Josef Newgarden was recognised as the pole-sitter for the race.)	(Canada) Robert Wickens	(Canada) Robert Wickens	(Republic of Ireland) Status Grand Prix	Report
5	R2	(Germany) Hockenheimring		(Mexico) Esteban Gutiérrez	(Mexico) Esteban Gutiérrez	(France) ART Grand Prix	Report
6	R1	(Hungary) Hungaroring	(Switzerland) Nico Müller (Note: Nico Müller and Esteban Gutiérrez set identical lap times, but Müller was the pole-sitter as he set it first.)	(Mexico) Esteban Gutiérrez	(Switzerland) Nico Müller	(Switzerland) Jenzer Motorsport	Report
6	R2	(Hungary) Hungaroring		(Canada) Robert Wickens	(United States) Alexander Rossi	(France) ART Grand Prix	Report
7	R1	(Belgium) Circuit de Spa-Francorchamps	(Canada) Robert Wickens (Note: Daniel Juncadella recorded the fastest time in qualifying, but got penalty for disregarding yellow flags. Robert Wickens was recognised as the pole-sitter for the race.)	(Switzerland) Nico Müller	(Canada) Robert Wickens	(Republic of Ireland) Status Grand Prix	Report
7	R2	(Belgium) Circuit de Spa-Francorchamps		(Switzerland) Nico Müller	(France) Adrien Tambay	(United Kingdom) Manor Racing	Report
8	R1	(Italy) Autodromo Nazionale Monza	(Mexico) Esteban Gutiérrez	(Mexico) Esteban Gutiérrez	(Mexico) Esteban Gutiérrez	(France) ART Grand Prix	Report
8	R2	(Italy) Autodromo Nazionale Monza		(Norway) Pål Varhaug (Note: Pål Varhaug set the fastest lap, but did not finish in the top 10, so was ineligible to be the point-scorer for the fastest lap. Leonardo Cordeiro was the point-scorer instead for setting the fastest lap of those finishing in the top 10.)	(Canada) Robert Wickens	(Republic of Ireland) Status Grand Prix	Report

== Championship standings ==
=== Drivers' Championship ===
Pos	Driver	CAT (Spain)		IST (Turkey)		VAL (Spain)		SIL (United Kingdom)		HOC (Germany)		HUN (Hungary)		SPA (Belgium)		MNZ (Italy)		Points
1	(Mexico) Esteban Gutiérrez	3	3	1	7	**1**	7	**1**	3	4	1	2	5	16	7	**1**	Ret	88
2	(Canada) Robert Wickens	2	4	11	21	2	16	9	5	1	5	4	2	**1**	11	2	1	71
3	(Switzerland) Nico Müller	13	9	6	4	7	1	3	4	Ret	17	**1**	6	4	6	4	3	53
4	(United States) Alexander Rossi	8	1	4	3	Ret	Ret	5	2	Ret	8	8	1	13	2	Ret	15	38
5	(Indonesia) Rio Haryanto	20	25	8	1	6	4	2	Ret	Ret	Ret	20	11	18	18	3	23	27
6	(Spain) Roberto Merhi					3	2	Ret	19	16	Ret	Ret	22	2	22†	6	4	26
7	(United Kingdom) Dean Smith	4	5	22†	10	17	23	6	22	9	12	5	3	6	4	Ret	16	24
8	(United Kingdom) James Jakes	9	7	2	8	8	3	Ret	11	2	Ret					13	Ret	21
9	(Monaco) Stefano Coletti			24†	14	10	6	10	Ret	5	3	3	4	Ret	24	16	20	18
10	(Spain) Miki Monrás	10	23	7	2	5	13	15	18	Ret	15	Ret	20	9	3	11	6	17
11	(Italy) Mirko Bortolotti	16	Ret	25†	12	18	10	8	13	6	4	11	8	Ret	14	5	2	16
12	(Canada) Daniel Morad	Ret	22	5	5	19	12	7	1	Ret	9	21	12	Ret	16	9	7	15
13	(Norway) Pål Varhaug	1	Ret	15	18	11	8	14	9	12	Ret	17	23	15	17	14	19	10
14	(Spain) Daniel Juncadella	11	11					Ret	Ret	8	2			5	DSQ	22	Ret	10
15	(United Kingdom) Adrian Quaife-Hobbs	21	26	Ret	Ret	12	5	Ret	Ret	DNS	18	12	7	3	5	17	22	10
16	(Brazil) Felipe Guimarães	Ret	20	3	6	Ret	18	Ret	23	7	7	13	Ret	Ret	9	Ret	17	9
17	(France) Jean-Éric Vergne	5	21			4	17											9
18	(United States) Josef Newgarden	Ret	16	10	23	Ret	26	16	10	**18**†	19	7	Ret	Ret	21	7	5	8
19	(Brazil) Lucas Foresti	7	2			21	28	18	16	Ret	14					20	Ret	7
20	(France) Adrien Tambay											18	9	Ret	1			6
21	(Netherlands) Renger van der Zande	15	24	Ret	Ret	Ret	24	11	7	3	Ret	9	Ret	Ret	Ret	Ret	Ret	6
22	(Germany) Tobias Hegewald	17	13	16	15	9	29†	4	6	Ret	Ret	15	Ret	11	8	10	11	6
23	(Netherlands) Nigel Melker	**Ret**	14	**23**	17	Ret	15	12	Ret	Ret	Ret	23	14	12	15	8	13	5
24	(Brazil) Pedro Nunes	12	6	Ret	19	15	11	Ret	20	14	6	19	Ret	7	19	24	Ret	4
25	(Switzerland) Simon Trummer	6	8	20	13	13	27	17	12	11	Ret			8	Ret	Ret	24	4
26	(Portugal) António Félix da Costa											6	17	Ret	12			3
27	(Brazil) Leonardo Cordeiro	18	12	18	24	Ret	21	Ret	Ret	Ret	Ret	22	13	14	Ret	Ret	8	1
28	(United Kingdom) Oliver Oakes	14	10	12	Ret	Ret	19	13	8	13	20†	16	10	17	10	12	9	0
29	(Romania) Doru Sechelariu	22	Ret	9	9	Ret	20	Ret	17	10	DSQ	14	21	Ret	20	21	18	0
30	(Mexico) Pablo Sánchez López	Ret	15	21	16	14	9	21	14	Ret	11	Ret	16	Ret	25	18	12	0
31	(Denmark) Michael Christensen	Ret	18	13	11	Ret	14	Ret	15	Ret	10	10	Ret	10	23†	15	10	0
32	(Russia) Ivan Lukashevich	19	19	19	27	16	25	19	Ret	17	13	25	18	Ret	13	19	14	0
33	(Italy) Patrick Reiterer	NC	17	14	25													0
34	(Italy) Vittorio Ghirelli	DNS	DNS	17	26	20	22	20	21	15	16	24	15	Ret	Ret	23	21	0
35	(Spain) Marco Barba											Ret	19					0
36	(France) Jim Pla			Ret	20													0
37	(Russia) Mikhail Aleshin			Ret	22													0
Pos	Driver	CAT (Spain)		IST (Turkey)		VAL (Spain)		SIL (United Kingdom)		HOC (Germany)		HUN (Hungary)		SPA (Belgium)		MNZ (Italy)		Points

Key
Colour	Result
Gold	Winner
Silver	2nd place
Bronze	3rd place
Green	Other points position
Blue	Other classified position
Blue	Not classified, finished (NC)
Purple	Not classified, retired (Ret)
Red	Did not qualify (DNQ)
Red	Did not pre-qualify (DNPQ)
Black	Disqualified (DSQ)
White	Did not start (DNS)
White	Race cancelled (C)
Blank	Did not practice (DNP)
Blank	Excluded (EX)
Blank	Did not arrive (DNA)
Blank	Withdrawn (WD)
Text formatting	Meaning
**Bold**	Pole position point(s)
Italics	Fastest lap point(s)

=== Teams' Championship ===
Pos	Team	No	CAT (Spain)		IST (Turkey)		VAL (Spain)		SIL (United Kingdom)		HOC (Germany)		HUN (Hungary)		SPA (Belgium)		MNZ (Italy)		Points
1	(France) ART Grand Prix	1	8	1	4	3	Ret	Ret	5	2	Ret	8	8	1	13	2	Ret	15	130
1	(France) ART Grand Prix	2	3	3	1	7	**1**	7	**1**	3	4	1	2	5	16	7	**1**	Ret	130
1	(France) ART Grand Prix	3	12	6	Ret	19	15	11	Ret	20	14	6	19	Ret	7	19	19	Ret	130
2	(Republic of Ireland) Status Grand Prix	4	2	4	11	21	2	16	9	5	1	5	4	2	**1**	11	2	1	86
2	(Republic of Ireland) Status Grand Prix	5	19	19	19	27	16	25	19	Ret	17	13	25	18	Ret	13	19	14	86
2	(Republic of Ireland) Status Grand Prix	6	Ret	22	5	5	19	12	7	1	Ret	9	21	12	Ret	16	9	7	86
3	(Switzerland) Jenzer Motorsport	23	1	Ret	15	18	11	8	14	9	12	Ret	17	23	15	17	14	19	67
3	(Switzerland) Jenzer Motorsport	24	6	8	20	13	13	27	17	12	11	Ret	Ret	19	8	Ret	Ret	24	67
3	(Switzerland) Jenzer Motorsport	25	13	9	6	4	7	1	3	4	Ret	17	**1**	6	4	6	4	3	67
4	(United Kingdom) Manor Racing	7	9	7	2	8	8	3	Ret	11	2	Ret	18	9	Ret	1	13	Ret	64
4	(United Kingdom) Manor Racing	8	20	25	8	1	6	4	2	Ret	Ret	Ret	20	11	18	18	3	23	64
4	(United Kingdom) Manor Racing	9	21	26	Ret	Ret	12	5	Ret	Ret	DNS	18	12	7	3	5	17	22	64
5	(United Kingdom) Carlin	14	Ret	16	10	23	Ret	26	16	10	**18**†	19	7	Ret	Ret	21	7	5	42
5	(United Kingdom) Carlin	15	4	5	22†	10	19	12	6	22	9	12	5	3	6	4	Ret	16	42
5	(United Kingdom) Carlin	16	7	2	Ret	22	21	28	18	16	Ret	14	6	17	Ret	12	20	Ret	42
6	(France) Tech 1 Racing	26	22	Ret	9	9	Ret	20	Ret	17	10	DSQ	14	21	Ret	20	21	18	37
6	(France) Tech 1 Racing	27	11	11	24†	14	10	6	10	Ret	5	3	3	4	Ret	24	16	20	37
6	(France) Tech 1 Racing	28	5	21	Ret	20	4	17	Ret	Ret	8	2			5	DSQ	22	Ret	37
7	(United Kingdom) Atech CRS GP	29	NC	17	14	25	3	2	Ret	19	16	Ret	Ret	22	2	22†	6	4	26
7	(United Kingdom) Atech CRS GP	30	14	10	12	Ret	Ret	19	13	8	13	20†	16	10	17	10	12	9	26
7	(United Kingdom) Atech CRS GP	31	DNS	DNS	17	26	20	22	20	21	15	16	24	15	Ret	Ret	23	21	26
8	(Spain) Addax Team	17	Ret	20	3	6	Ret	18	Ret	23	7	7	13	Ret	Ret	9	Ret	17	25
8	(Spain) Addax Team	18	Ret	15	21	16	14	9	21	14	Ret	11	Ret	16	Ret	25	18	12	25
8	(Spain) Addax Team	19	16	Ret	25†	12	18	10	8	13	6	4	11	8	Ret	14	5	2	25
9	(Australia) MW Arden	20	Ret	18	13	11	Ret	14	Ret	15	Ret	10	10	Ret	10	23†	15	10	18
9	(Australia) MW Arden	21	10	23	7	2	5	13	15	18	Ret	15	Ret	20	9	3	11	6	18
9	(Australia) MW Arden	22	18	12	18	24	Ret	21	Ret	Ret	Ret	Ret	22	13	14	Ret	Ret	8	18
10	(Germany) RSC Mücke Motorsport	10	**Ret**	14	**23**	17	Ret	15	12	Ret	Ret	Ret	23	14	12	15	8	13	17
10	(Germany) RSC Mücke Motorsport	11	15	24	Ret	Ret	Ret	24	11	7	3	Ret	9	Ret	Ret	Ret	Ret	Ret	17
10	(Germany) RSC Mücke Motorsport	12	17	13	16	15	9	29†	4	6	Ret	Ret	15	Ret	11	8	12	11	17
Pos	Team	No	CAT (Spain)		IST (Turkey)		VAL (Spain)		SIL (United Kingdom)		HOC (Germany)		HUN (Hungary)		SPA (Belgium)		MNZ (Italy)		Points

Key
Colour	Result
Gold	Winner
Silver	2nd place
Bronze	3rd place
Green	Other points position
Blue	Other classified position
Blue	Not classified, finished (NC)
Purple	Not classified, retired (Ret)
Red	Did not qualify (DNQ)
Red	Did not pre-qualify (DNPQ)
Black	Disqualified (DSQ)
White	Did not start (DNS)
White	Race cancelled (C)
Blank	Did not practice (DNP)
Blank	Excluded (EX)
Blank	Did not arrive (DNA)
Blank	Withdrawn (WD)
Text formatting	Meaning
**Bold**	Pole position point(s)
Italics	Fastest lap point(s)

- Drivers who did not finish the race but were classified are marked with †.

== See also ==
- 2010 Formula Three Euroseries season
- 2010 British Formula 3 season
- 2010 Masters of Formula 3
