= GP3 Series =

Former single-seater racing series

- Category: Single seaters
- Country: International
- Inaugural season: 2010
- Folded: 2018
- Drivers: 28
- Teams: 7
- Chassis suppliers: Dallara
- Engine suppliers: Mecachrome
- Tyre suppliers: Pirelli
- Last Drivers' champion: (France) Anthoine Hubert
- Last Teams' champion: (France) ART Grand Prix
- Official website: gp3series.com

The GP3 Series, or GP3 for short, was a single-seater motor racing series launched in 2010 as a feeder series for the GP2 Series, introduced by GP2 organiser Bruno Michel. GP3 followed the entire European leg of the Formula One series and the GP2 (now Formula 2) series as a support race for the two. Like the GP2 series, GP3 gave drivers the experience of the Grand Prix environment, and took advantage of the infrastructure, such as marshals and medical facilities, in place for the Formula One events. GP3 Series mainly raced on European circuits, but had appearances on other international race tracks, with rounds in the 2015 season at the Bahrain International Circuit in Bahrain and the Yas Marina Circuit in United Arab Emirates.

Many drivers had since stepped up to GP2 since the series began, with the 2010 champion Esteban Gutiérrez, Pål Varhaug and ninth-place finisher Stefano Coletti being the first to do so for the 2011 season. 2011 champion Valtteri Bottas did not follow suit, however, and instead joined Williams as a reserve driver. Meanwhile, James Calado, Rio Haryanto, Simon Trummer, Tom Dillmann and Nigel Melker all joined GP2 for the 2012 season. Other drivers who have graduated to other series are James Jakes who moved to the IndyCar Series for 2011, Josef Newgarden to the Indy Lights series in 2011 and Alexander Rossi and Robert Wickens who moved to the Formula Renault 3.5 Series in 2011 and Lewis Williamson in 2012.

In the series' short history, fourteen drivers have gone on to compete in Formula One. These include former champions Esteban Gutiérrez, Daniil Kvyat, Valtteri Bottas, Esteban Ocon, Jean-Éric Vergne, Carlos Sainz Jr., Charles Leclerc, and George Russell.

In 2019, the series merged with the FIA Formula 3 European Championship and became the FIA Formula 3 Championship.

== GP3 Series cars ==
The GP3 Series car was a standardised car used by all of the competing teams.

=== Dallara GP3/10 ===
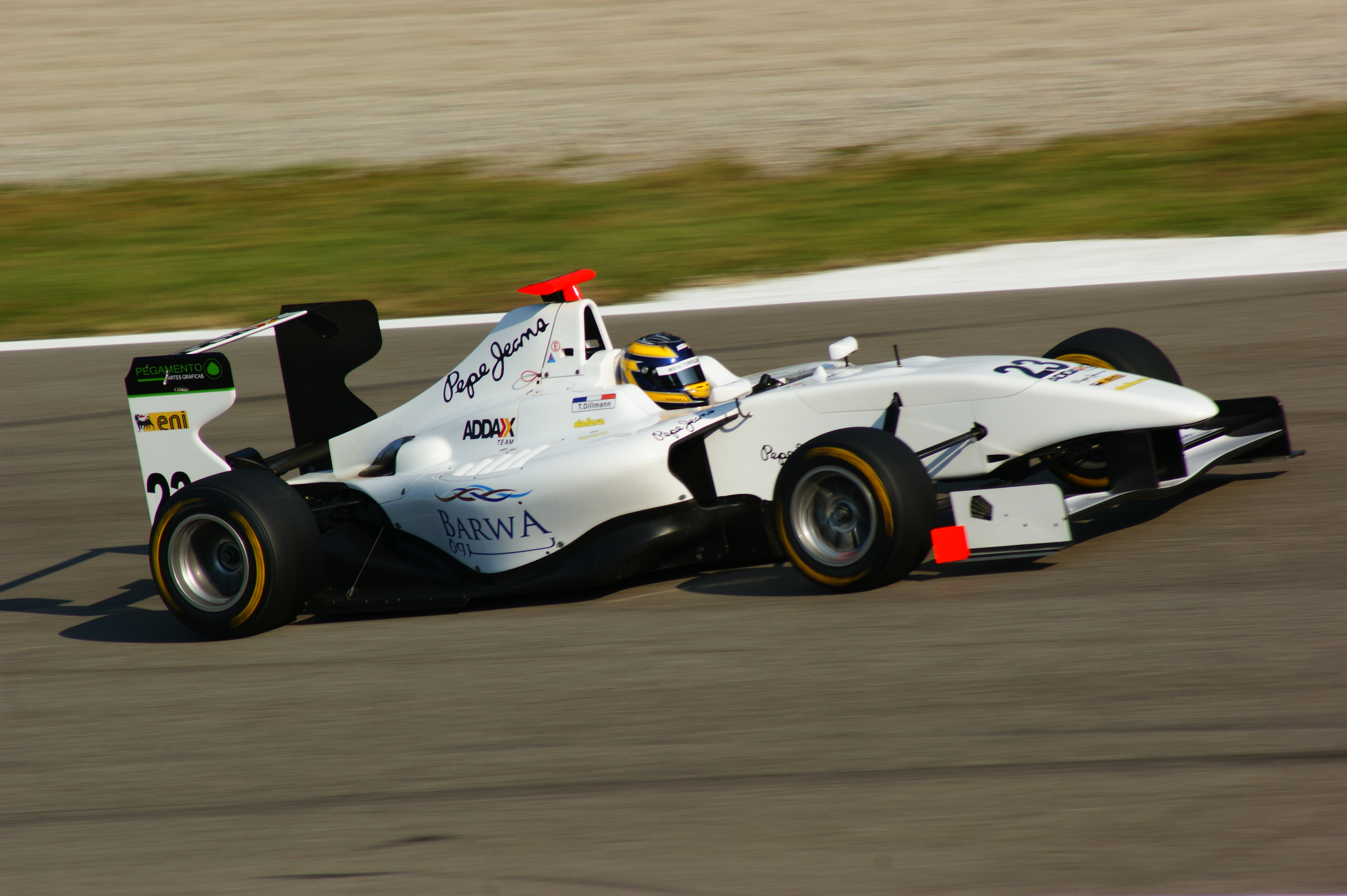
A typical GP3/10 car driven by Tom Dillmann in 2011

For the 2010–2012 seasons, the GP3 series used the GP3/10 chassis.

Chassis
The car had been designed and built by Dallara, who currently produces the F2 chassis.

Engine
The GP3/10 used a race-tuned four-cylinder 2.0-litre turbocharged 280 hp engine developed by Renault Sport (based on B20F engine), while turbochargers were supplied by Pankl Racing Systems. The wastegate was included due to turbocharger rules.

Gearbox
The GP3/10 used a 6 speed longitudinal sequential Hewland gearbox.

Tyres
Pirelli supplied the tyres for GP3 from 2010 to 2012, same supplier for the GP2 Series.

==== Specifications ====
- Engine displacement: 2.0 L (122 cu in) DOHC inline-4
- Gearbox: 6-speed paddle shift gearbox (must have reverse)
- Weight: 630 kg (1,389 lb)
- Power output: 280 hp (209 kW)
- Fuel: Elf LMS 102 RON unleaded
- Fuel capacity: 65 litres (17 US gallons)
- Fuel delivery: Direct fuel injection
- Aspiration: Single-turbocharged
- Turbo boost pressure: 0.5 bar (7.25 psi; 50.00 kPa; 375.03 Torr; 0.49 atm; 14.76 inHg)
- Length: 4,471 mm (176 in)
- Width: 1,885 mm (74 in)
- Wheelbase: 2,780 mm (109 in)
- Steering: Non-assisted rack and pinion
- Tyres: Pirelli P Zero slick dry and treaded wet

=== Dallara GP3/13 ===
For the 2013–2015 seasons, the GP3 series used the GP3/13 chassis.

Chassis
The car was also designed and built by Dallara.

Engine
The GP3/13 used a naturally aspirated 3.4-litre V6 400 hp engine, developed by AER Ltd. with designation P57.

Gearbox
The GP3/13 used a 6 speed longitudinal sequential gearbox developed by Hewland.

Tyres
Pirelli continued to supply the tyres for GP3 from 2013 onwards.

==== Specifications ====
- Engine displacement: 3.4 L (207 cu in) DOHC V6
- Gearbox: 6-speed paddle shift gearbox (must have reverse)
- Weight: 1,389 lb (630 kg)
- Power output: 400 hp (298 kW)
- Fuel: Elf LMS 102 RON unleaded
- Fuel capacity: 65 litres (17 US gallons)
- Fuel delivery: Fuel injection
- Aspiration: Naturally-aspirated
- Length: 4,480 mm (176 in)
- Width: 1,880 mm (74 in)
- Wheelbase: 2,780 mm (109 in)
- Steering: Non-assisted rack and pinion
- Tyres: Pirelli P Zero slick dry and Pirelli Cinturato treaded wet

=== Dallara GP3/16 ===
The series used another new chassis for the 2016 season, and continued to be used until 2018.

Chassis
The car has also been designed and built by Dallara.

Engine
The GP3/16 used a naturally aspirated 3.4-litre V6 400 hp engine, developed by Mecachrome with model V634, prepared and maintained by Teos Engineering.

Gearbox
The GP3/16 used a 6 speed longitudinal sequential gearbox developed by Hewland.

Tyres
Pirelli continued to supply the tyres for GP3 from 2016 to the 2018 season.

==== Specifications ====
- Engine displacement: 3.4 L (207 cu in) DOHC V6
- Gearbox: 6-speed paddle shift gearbox (must have reverse)
- Weight: 1,457 lb (661 kg)
- Power output: 400 hp (298 kW)
- Fuel: Elf LMS 102 RON unleaded
- Fuel capacity: 65 litres (17 US gallons)
- Fuel delivery: Direct fuel injection
- Aspiration: naturally aspirated
- Length: 4,580 mm (180 in) in 2016 later 4,620 mm (182 in) in 2017-2018
- Width: 1,872 mm (74 in)
- Wheelbase: 2,880 mm (113 in)
- Steering: Non-assisted rack and pinion
- Tyres: Pirelli P Zero slick dry and Pirelli Cinturato treaded wet

== Race weekend ==
A race weekend features one 45-minute practice session on Friday, and one 30-minute qualifying session on Saturday, followed by two races. The qualifying session is a straight fight for the fastest laptime, and determines the order of the grid for Saturday's Race 1.

Race 2 is on Sunday. The grid is decided by the Saturday result with top 8 being reversed, so the driver who finished 8th on Saturday will start from pole position and the polesitter will start from 8th place.

The distance of each race is decided prior to the event, however, should 30 minutes elapse before the designated number of laps are completed the lead driver will be shown the chequered flag.

== Points system ==
=== 2010–2011 ===
Points system for feature race
1st	2nd	3rd	4th	5th	6th	7th	8th
10	8	6	5	4	3	2	1

Points system for sprint race
1st	2nd	3rd	4th	5th	6th
6	5	4	3	2	1

- Pole for Saturday races: 2 points
- Fastest lap: 1 point in each race
- Driver recording fastest lap has to drive 90% of race laps and must finish in the top ten of the race to be eligible for the fastest lap point.

With this points system, the most points anyone can score in one round is 20 by claiming pole position, winning both races with the fastest lap in each race.

No driver ever did manage to get maximum points with this system. The closest drivers who have done so are Esteban Gutiérrez at the 2010 British round, who managed pole position for the feature race, won the feature race and got the fastest lap, and then came third in the sprint race, which equals a total of 17 points. Valtteri Bottas at the 2011 Hungarian round achieved pole position and won the feature race, and then came second in the sprint race, also totaling 17 points.

=== 2012 onwards ===
Points system For Race 1
1st	2nd	3rd	4th	5th	6th	7th	8th	9th	10th	PL	FL
25	18	15	12	10	8	6	4	2	1	4	2

Points system For Race 2
1st	2nd	3rd	4th	5th	6th	7th	8th	FL
15	12	10	8	6	4	2	1	2

- Pole for Saturday races: 4 points
- Fastest lap: 2 points in each race
- Driver recording fastest lap has to drive 90% of race laps and must finish in the top ten of the race to be eligible for the fastest lap point.

With this points system, the most points anyone can score in one round is 48 by claiming pole position, winning both races with the fastest lap in each race.

So far throughout the new points system, no driver has achieved the maximum number of points in a single round. In the Hungarian round of 2012, António Félix da Costa became first driver to win both races of the weekend.

== Teams and drivers ==
GP3 Series has ten European teams and thirty drivers representing the Series. Manor Racing, Atech CRS GP and Carlin represent Great Britain, whilst flying the French flag is GP2 Series 2009 Champions ART Grand Prix and Tech 1 Racing. MW Arden in association with ex-Formula One driver Mark Webber race under an Australian license. Spaniard Addax Team, German RSC Mücke Motorsport in association with Ralf Schumacher, Irish-Canadian Status Grand Prix, and Swiss team Jenzer Motorsport complete the lineup.

== Champions ==
=== Drivers' ===
Season	Driver	Team	Poles	Wins	Podiums	Fastest laps	Points	% points achievable	Clinched	Margin	Ref
2010	(Mexico) Esteban Gutiérrez	(France) ART Grand Prix	3	5	9	7	88	55.000	Race 15 of 16	17	
2011	(Finland) Valtteri Bottas	(France) Lotus ART	1	4	7	3	62	38.750	Race 15 of 16	7	
2012	(New Zealand) Mitch Evans	(Australia) MW Arden	4	3	6	3	151.5	40.891	Race 16 of 16	2	
2013	(Russia) Daniil Kvyat	(Australia) MW Arden	2	3	5	4	168	43.750	Race 15 of 16	30	
2014	(United Kingdom) Alex Lynn	(United Kingdom) Carlin	2	3	8	3	207	47.917	Race 17 of 18	44	
2015	(France) Esteban Ocon	(France) ART Grand Prix	3	1	14	5	253	58.565	Race 18 of 18	8	
2016	(Monaco) Charles Leclerc	(France) ART Grand Prix	4	3	8	4	202	46.759	Race 17 of 18	25	
2017	(United Kingdom) George Russell	(France) ART Grand Prix	4	4	7	5	220	59.946	Race 13 of 16	79	
2018	(France) Anthoine Hubert	(France) ART Grand Prix	2	2	11	4	214	49.537	Race 17 of 18	16	

=== Teams' ===
Season	Team	Poles	Wins	Podiums	Fastest laps	Points	Clinched	Margin	Ref
2010	(France) ART Grand Prix	3	7	14	8	130	Race 14 of 16	44	
2011	(France) Lotus ART	2	6	14	4	124	Race 14 of 16	55	
2012	(France) Lotus GP	3	4	16	0	378.5	Race 15 of 16	69	
2013	(France) ART Grand Prix	2	4	14	4	378	Race 15 of 16	100	
2014	(United Kingdom) Carlin	2	4	13	4	347	Race 18 of 18	17	
2015	(France) ART Grand Prix	4	6	6	11	477	Race 15 of 18	195	
2016	(France) ART Grand Prix	8	9	23	8	588	Race 13 of 18	291	
2017	(France) ART Grand Prix	8	7	23	11	578	Race 11 of 16	292	
2018	(France) ART Grand Prix	4	9	29	11	640	Race 15 of 18	207	

== Drivers graduated to GP2 ==
Driver	GP3				GP2					Other major titles after GP3 Series
Driver	Seasons	Races	Wins	Podiums	Seasons	First team	Races	Wins	Podiums	Other major titles after GP3 Series
(Germany) Daniel Abt	2012	16	2	7	2013–2014	ART Grand Prix	42	0	0	
(Switzerland) Zoël Amberg	2011	6	0	0	2015	Venezuela GP Lazarus	2	0	0	
(United Kingdom) Emil Bernstorff	2014–2015	32	4	12	2016	Arden	2	0	0	
(United Kingdom) James Calado	2011	16	1	6	2012–2013	Lotus ART	46	4	14	World Endurance GT Drivers' Championship
(Italy) Kevin Ceccon†	2012	16	0	1	2011, 2013	Trident Racing	19	0	1	
(Monaco) Stefano Coletti†‡	2010	14	0	2	2009, 2011–2014	Durango	88	7	15	
(United States) Conor Daly	2011–2013	48	2	11	2013–2014	Hilmer Motorsport	20	0	0	
(France) Tom Dillmann	2011	14	0	1	2012–2014	iSport International	43	1	4	Formula V8 3.5 Series
(Cyprus) Tio Ellinas	2012–2013	32	3	4	2014	MP Motorsport	8	0	0	
(New Zealand) Mitch Evans	2011–2012	32	4	8	2013–2014	Arden	44	2	10	
(Italy) Luca Ghiotto	2014–2015	22	5	9	2016	Trident Racing	22	1	2	
(Italy) Vittorio Ghirelli	2010–2011	28	0	0	2013	Venezuela GP Lazarus	10	0	0	Auto GP
(Mexico) Esteban Gutiérrez‡	2010	16	5	9	2011–2012	Lotus ART	44	4	9	
(Indonesia) Rio Haryanto	2010–2011	32	3	7	2012–2015	DAMS	90	3	7	
(United Kingdom) James Jakes‡	2010	12	0	3	2009–2011	Super Nova Racing	2	0	0	
(Germany) Marvin Kirchhöfer	2014–2015	34	6	15	2016	Carlin Motorsport	20	0	2	
(United Kingdom) Alex Lynn	2014	18	3	8	2015–2016	DAMS	40	4	8	
(United Kingdom) Jann Mardenborough	2014–2015	32	1	4	2015	Carlin	2	0	0	
(Netherlands) Nigel Melker	2010–2011	32	1	5	2012	DAMS	23	0	0	
(Switzerland) Patric Niederhauser	2012–2014	50	5	8	2015	Venezuela GP Lazarus	10	0	0	ADAC GT Masters
(United Kingdom) Adrian Quaife-Hobbs	2010–2011	31	1	3	2013–2014	MP Motorsport	40	1	4	Auto GP World Series
(Argentina) Facu Regalia	2012–2013	20	1	2	2014	Hilmer Motorsport	8	0	0	
(United States) Alexander Rossi‡	2010	16	2	5	2013–2015	Caterham Racing	52	4	11	
(New Zealand) Richie Stanaway	2011, 2014	22	3	6	2015	Status Grand Prix	18	2	2	
(Philippines) Marlon Stöckinger	2011–2012	36	1	2	2015	Status Grand Prix	21	0	0	
(United Kingdom) Dean Stoneman	2013–2014	20	5	7	2015	Carlin	6	0	0	
(Switzerland) Simon Trummer	2010–2011	30	0	0	2012–2014	Arden	68	0	1	
(Romania) Robert Vișoiu	2012–2014	40	2	3	2015	Rapax	18	0	0	
(Norway) Pål Varhaug‡	2010	16	1	1	2011, 2013	DAMS	22	0	0	
(United Kingdom) Nick Yelloly	2011, 2013-2014	50	1	9	2015	Hilmer Motorsport	12	0	0	

Notes:

- Drivers are listed by their last year in GP3 Series. Usually they started in GP2 at the start of the following season.
- Gold background denotes GP3 champion.
- † Coletti had three GP2 starts in 2009 for Durango; his first GP2 team since driving in GP3 2010 was Trident Racing. Ceccon also had 8 starts in GP2 with Scuderia Coloni; he joined Trident Racing for 2013 after a year of GP3 in 2012.
- ‡ Denotes drivers who raced in the GP2 Asia Series.
- Gutiérrez, Calado, Dillmann, Coletti, Haryanto, Melker, Trummer and Ceccon all participated in the 2 race 2011 GP2 Final.
- Jakes raced in the 2008–2009, 2009–2010 and 2011 Asia Series along with two races in the 2010 Main GP2 series.
- Also, António Félix da Costa and Alexander Rossi raced in the final (non-championship) round of the 2011 GP2 Series season at Yas Marina.

== Drivers graduated to FIA Formula 2 ==
Driver	GP3				FIA Formula 2					Other major titles after GP3 Series
Driver	Seasons	Races	Wins	Podiums	Seasons	First team	Races	Wins	Podiums	Other major titles after GP3 Series
(United Kingdom) Jack Aitken	2016–2017	33	2	13	2018–2021	ART Grand Prix	48	4	9	
(Thailand) Alexander Albon	2016	18	4	7	2017–2018	ART Grand Prix	44	4	10	
(France) Giuliano Alesi	2016–2018	48	4	8	2019–2020	Trident Motorsport	22	0	0	
(France) Dorian Boccolacci	2017–2018	25	2	4	2018–2019	MP Motorsport	20	0	0	
(Switzerland) Ralph Boschung	2015–2016	30	1	2	2017–2023	Campos Racing	122	1	5	
(Colombia) Tatiana Calderón	2016–2018	51	0	0	2019,2022	Arden	22	0	0	
(United States) Juan Manuel Correa	2017–2018	25	0	0	2019,2022–2024	Charouz Racing System	68	0	3	
(India) Jehan Daruvala	2018	2	0	0	2020–2023	Carlin Motorsport	100	4	18	
(Netherlands) Nyck de Vries	2016	18	2	5	2017–2019	DAMS	70	8	23	FIA Formula 2 Championship, FIA Formula E World Championship
(United States) Santino Ferrucci	2016–2017	24	0	0	2017–2018	Trident Motorsport	24	0	0	
(Japan) Nirei Fukuzumi	2016–2017	32	2	9	2018	Arden International	23	0	0	
(Italy) Antonio Fuoco	2015–2016	36	2	10	2017–2018	Prema Racing	46	3	11	
(France) Anthoine Hubert	2017–2018	33	2	15	2019	Arden International	16	2	2	
(United Kingdom) Jake Hughes	2016	18	2	4	2020–2022	HWA Racelab	26	0	0	
(United Kingdom) Callum Ilott	2018	18	2	7	2017, 2019–2020	Trident Motorsport	48	3	8	
(Russia) Matevos Isaakyan	2015–2016	22	0	0	2019	Charouz Racing System	4	0	0	
(Finland) Niko Kari	2016–2018	31	1	2	2018	MP Motorsport	4	0	0	
(Monaco) Charles Leclerc	2016	18	3	8	2017	Prema Racing	22	7	10	FIA Formula 2 Championship
(Italy) Alessio Lorandi	2016–2018	27	1	5	2018	Trident Motorsport	10	0	0	
(Denmark) Christian Lundgaard	2018	2	0	0	2019–2021	Trident Motorsport	2	0	0	
(India) Arjun Maini	2016–2017	29	1	3	2018–2019	Trident Motorsport	29	0	0	
(Russia) Nikita Mazepin	2018	18	4	8	2019–2020	ART Grand Prix	22	0	0	
(Spain) Roberto Merhi	2010	12	0	3	2018–2019, 2022	Campos Racing	33	0	0	
(Spain) Álex Palou	2015–2016	36	1	2	2017	Campos Racing	4	0	0	IndyCar Series
(Brazil) Pedro Piquet	2018	18	2	4	2020	Charouz Racing System	24	0	0	
(India) Mahaveer Raghunathan	2016	2	0	0	2020	MP Motorsport	20	0	0	
(United Kingdom) George Russell	2017	15	4	7	2018	ART Grand Prix	24	7	11	FIA Formula 2 Championship
(United Kingdom) Dan Ticktum	2017	5	0	1	2018, 2020–2021	Arden	49	3	11	
(United States) Ryan Tveter	2017–2018	33	0	5	2019	Trident Motorsport	2	0	0	

Notes:

- Gold background denotes GP3 champion.

== Drivers graduated to Formula One ==
Driver	GP3				F1					Other major titles after GP3 Series
Driver	Seasons	Races	Wins	Podiums	Seasons	First team	Races	Wins	Podiums	Other major titles after GP3 Series
(United Kingdom) Jack Aitken	2016-2017	33	2	13	2020	Williams	1	0	0	
**(Thailand) Alexander Albon**	2016	18	4	7	2019–2020, 2022–2026	Toro Rosso	151	0	2	
**(Finland) Valtteri Bottas**	2011	16	4	7	2013–2024, 2026	Williams	268	10	67	
(Netherlands) Nyck de Vries	2016	18	2	5	2022–2023	Williams	11	0	0	FIA Formula 2 Championship, FIA Formula E World Championship
(Mexico) Esteban Gutiérrez	2010	16	5	9	2013–2014, 2016	Sauber	59	0	0	
(Indonesia) Rio Haryanto	2010–2011	32	3	7	2016	Manor	12	0	0	
(Russia) Daniil Kvyat	2013	16	3	5	2014–2017, 2019–2020	Toro Rosso	112	0	3	
**(Monaco) Charles Leclerc**	2016	18	3	8	2018–2026	Sauber	194	9	56	FIA Formula 2 Championship
(Spain) Roberto Merhi	2010	12	0	3	2015	Manor	13	0	0	
**(France) Esteban Ocon**	2015	18	1	14	2016–2018, 2020–2026	Manor	199	1	4	
(United States) Alexander Rossi	2010	14	2	5	2015	Marussia	5	0	0	Indianapolis 500
**(Spain) Carlos Sainz Jr.**	2013	16	0	2	2015–2026	Toro Rosso	254	4	29	Formula Renault 3.5 Series
**(United Kingdom) George Russell**	2017	15	4	7	2019–2026	Williams	173	8	32	FIA Formula 2 Championship
(France) Jean-Éric Vergne	2010	4	0	0	2012–2014	Toro Rosso	58	0	0	FIA Formula E Championship (2017–18, 2018–19)

Notes:

- Gold background denotes GP3 champion
- **Bold** denotes an active Formula One driver.

== Seasons ==
=== 2010 ===
The 2010 GP3 Series was the inaugural season of the Series. The championship was contested over sixteen races held at eight rounds, beginning on May 8 at Circuit de Catalunya and ending on September 12 at Autodromo Nazionale Monza. The title was clinched by ART Grand Prix driver Esteban Gutiérrez at the final round by taking pole position, who won the championship 17 points clear of Robert Wickens in second, who was a further 18 points ahead of third place driver Nico Müller.

=== 2011 ===
The season began at Istanbul Park on 7 May and concluded at Autodromo Nazionale Monza on 11 September after eight rounds made up of two races each and all in support of European Formula 1 Grands Prix. The title was claimed by Valtteri Bottas who was only 7 points ahead of his teammate James Calado in second, while Nigel Melker finished 17 points adrift in third. This was to be ART Grand Prix's second championship in as many seasons.

=== 2012 ===
The season began on 12 May at Catalunya, Barcelona, and finished at the Autodromo Nazionale Monza on 9 September. It supported the entire European leg of the 2012 Formula One Season again and included the series' first visit to Monte Carlo, Monaco.

Going into the final round of the season, four drivers were in with a chance of winning the championship, but ultimately a move on the penultimate lap gave Mitch Evans the title with 151.5 points, only beating Daniel Abt by just two points on 149.5 while António Félix da Costa finished off the top three with 132 points. The teams title was also won during the last round by Lotus GP, their third title in as many seasons. The season was also the last for the first-generation chassis, the GP3/10.

=== 2013 ===
The season began on 11 May at Catalunya, Barcelona, and finished at the Yas Marina Circuit, Abu Dhabi on 3 November. It followed most of the European leg of the 2013 Formula One season again other than Monaco, and for the first time it hosted a non-European race at the last round in Abu Dhabi. It also saw the début of the series second-generation chassis, the Dallara GP3/13.

The title was clinched by Daniil Kvyat at the final round with 168 points, beating Facu Regalia by 30 points on 138 while Conor Daly finished off the top three with 126 points. The teams title was won by ART Grand Prix, their fourth title in as many seasons.

=== 2014 ===
The season began on 10 May at Catalunya, Barcelona, and finished at the Yas Marina Circuit, Abu Dhabi on 23 November. It once again followed most of the European leg of the 2014 Formula One season other than Monte Carlo, Monaco and the only non-European race at the last round in Abu Dhabi.

The title was clinched by Alex Lynn at the final round with 207 points, beating Dean Stoneman by 44 points on 163 while Marvin Kirchhöfer finished off the top three with 161 points. For the first time, the teams title was won by Carlin, becoming the first and only team other than ART Grand Prix to take the teams title.

=== 2015 ===
The season began on 9 May at Catalunya, Barcelona, and finished at the Yas Marina Circuit, Abu Dhabi on 29 November. It was contested over 18 races at nine rounds. There were nine teams with three cars each. Esteban Ocon won the title by 8 points despite winning only one race compared to second placed Luca Ghiotto winning five races. Ocon did however finish on the podium 14 times. The teams title was won by ART Grand Prix, their fifth title. This season was the last with the GP3/13 chassis.

=== 2016 ===
The season began on 14 May at Catalunya, Barcelona, and finished at the Yas Marina Circuit, Abu Dhabi on 27 November. It was contested over 18 races at nine rounds. There were seven teams with three to four cars each, with DAMS making its debut. The title was clinched by Charles Leclerc at the final round with 202 points, beating Alexander Albon by 25 points on 177 while Antonio Fuoco finished off the top three with 157 points. The teams title was won by ART Grand Prix at Monza, their sixth title. This season was the first with the series' third-generation chassis, the GP3/16.

=== 2017 ===
The season began on 13 May at Catalunya, Barcelona and finished at the Yas Marina Circuit, Abu Dhabi on 26 November. It was contested at 18 races at nine rounds. George Russell, Jack Aitken and Nirei Fukuzumi ended the season in the top 3 with ART Grand Prix. All drivers at the end of the season joined the 2018 FIA Formula 2 Championship. The second race at Italy was cancelled after heavy rain during the 2017 Italian Grand Prix. This season saw the series introduce the Drag Reduction System (DRS) used in Formula One and Formula 2.

=== 2018 ===
The final season of the series started on 12 May in Barcelona, and finished on 26 November at Yas Marina. The season was again contested of 9 rounds and 18 races. The final driver's title went to Frenchman Anthoine Hubert who drove for ART, take 2 victories, 11 podiums, 2 pole positions, and 4 fastest laps, with 214 points. ART Grand Prix won the final constructor's title, winning all but one constructor's titles in the series. It was also the last season with the GP3/16 chassis. With 198 points scored, Nikita Mazepin became runner-up with 4 victories, 8 podiums, 1 pole position and most 5 fastest laps. After a disaster weekend for Hubert in Red Bull Ring, it was his teammate, who retook the lead, but only in this round. Finally, Callum Ilott down to third, behind second place, but ultimately get to the top three and scored 167 points with 2 victories, 7 podiums, 1 pole position, and 2 fastest laps.

== Circuits ==
Number	Countries, rounds	Circuits	Years
1	(Spain) Catalunya GP3 round	Circuit de Barcelona-Catalunya	2010–2018
2	(Turkey) Istanbul Park GP3 round	Istanbul Park	2010–2011
3	(Spain) Valencia GP3 round	Valencia Street Circuit	2010–2012
4	(United Kingdom) Silverstone GP3 round	Silverstone Circuit	2010–2018
5	(Germany) Hockenheimring GP3 round	Hockenheimring	2010, 2012, 2014, 2016
6	(Hungary) Hungaroring GP3 round	Hungaroring	2010–2018
7	(Belgium) Spa-Francorchamps GP3 round	Circuit de Spa-Francorchamps	2010–2018
8	(Italy) Monza GP3 round	Autodromo Nazionale di Monza	2010–2018
9	(Germany) Nürburgring GP3 round	Nürburgring	2011, 2013
10	Monaco GP3 round	Circuit de Monaco	2012
11	(Spain) Ricardo Tormo GP3 round	Circuit Ricardo Tormo	2013
12	(United Arab Emirates) Yas Marina GP3 round	Yas Marina Circuit	2013–2018
13	(Austria) Spielberg GP3 round	Red Bull Ring	2014–2018
14	(Russia) Sochi GP3 round	Sochi Autodrom	2014–2015, 2018
15	Bahrain GP3 round	Bahrain International Circuit	2015
16	(Malaysia) Sepang GP3 round	Sepang International Circuit	2016
17	(Spain) Jerez GP3 round	Circuito de Jerez	2017
18	(France) Le Castellet GP3 round	Circuit Paul Ricard	2018

== See also ==
- List of GP3 Series drivers
- GP2 Series
- GP2 Asia Series
- Formula One
- Formula Two
- Formula Three
- International Formula Master
