= Maxime Jousse =

French racing driver (born 1991)

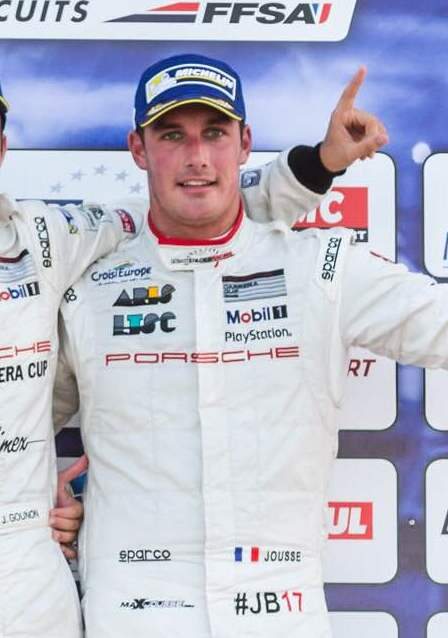
- Jousse in 2015
- Nationality: (France) French
- Born: Maxime Olivier Philippe Jousse; 25 June 1991 (age 35) Les Issambres, France
- Relatives: Julien Jousse (brother)
- Categorisation: FIA Silver (2012–2015); FIA Gold (2016–)

Championship titles
- 2015: Porsche Carrera Cup France

Maxime Olivier Philippe Jousse (born 25 June 1991) is a French racing driver. A Porsche one-make specialist, he was the 2010 Formula Palmer Audi runner-up and 2015 Porsche Carrera Cup France champion, as well as a 2016 24 Hours of Spa class winner.

== Personal life ==
Jousse is the younger brother of Julien Jousse, a former LMP1 and GT1 driver.

== Career ==
Jousse made his single-seater debut in 2007, competing in the Championnat de France FFSA Formule Campus Renault Elf. A season in the Formula Renault 2.0 West European Cup for Pole Services then followed, before Jousse joined Formula Palmer Audi in 2009, scoring a lone win at Silverstone to finish eighth in points. Remaining in the MotorSport Vision centrally-run series for 2010, Jousse scored six wins and four other podiums en route to runner-up honours in the overall standings. Switching to BVM – Target Racing to compete in the Italian Formula Three Championship the following year, Jousse took a lone win at Adria as well as four other podiums to secure sixth in points.

In 2012, Jousse transitioned to sportscar racing, joining Gulf Racing Middle East to race in the LMP2 class of the FIA World Endurance Championship. After scoring a best result of tenth at the 6 Hours of Spa-Francorchamps, Jousse left the team and series ahead of the 24 Hours of Le Mans on financial grounds and was replaced by Ludovic Badey. During 2012, Jousse also made one-off appearances in the European Le Mans Series for Status GP, Italian F3 for BVM and Porsche Carrera Cup France for Racing Technology.

Continuing in sportscars for 2013, Jousse joined Sébastien Loeb Racing to make his debut in Porsche Carrera Cup France. In his first season in the series, Jousse scored wins at Pau and Magny-Cours, as well as taking three other podiums en route to a fourth-place points finish. At the end of the year, Jousse was chosen to represent Porsche Carrera Cup France in the Porsche International Cup Scholarship Program in October. Remaining with the team for his second season in the series the following year, Jousse began the season with a win at Lédenon, before taking further wins at Nogaro and Le Castellet to secure runner-up honours. During 2014, Jousse also raced for the same team in select rounds of Porsche Supercup. Staying with Sébastien Loeb Racing for 2015, Jousse began the year with a win at Le Mans, before winning both Magny-Cours races and taking three other podiums to clinch the title. During 2015, Jousse also raced for the team in the Monza round of Porsche Supercup.

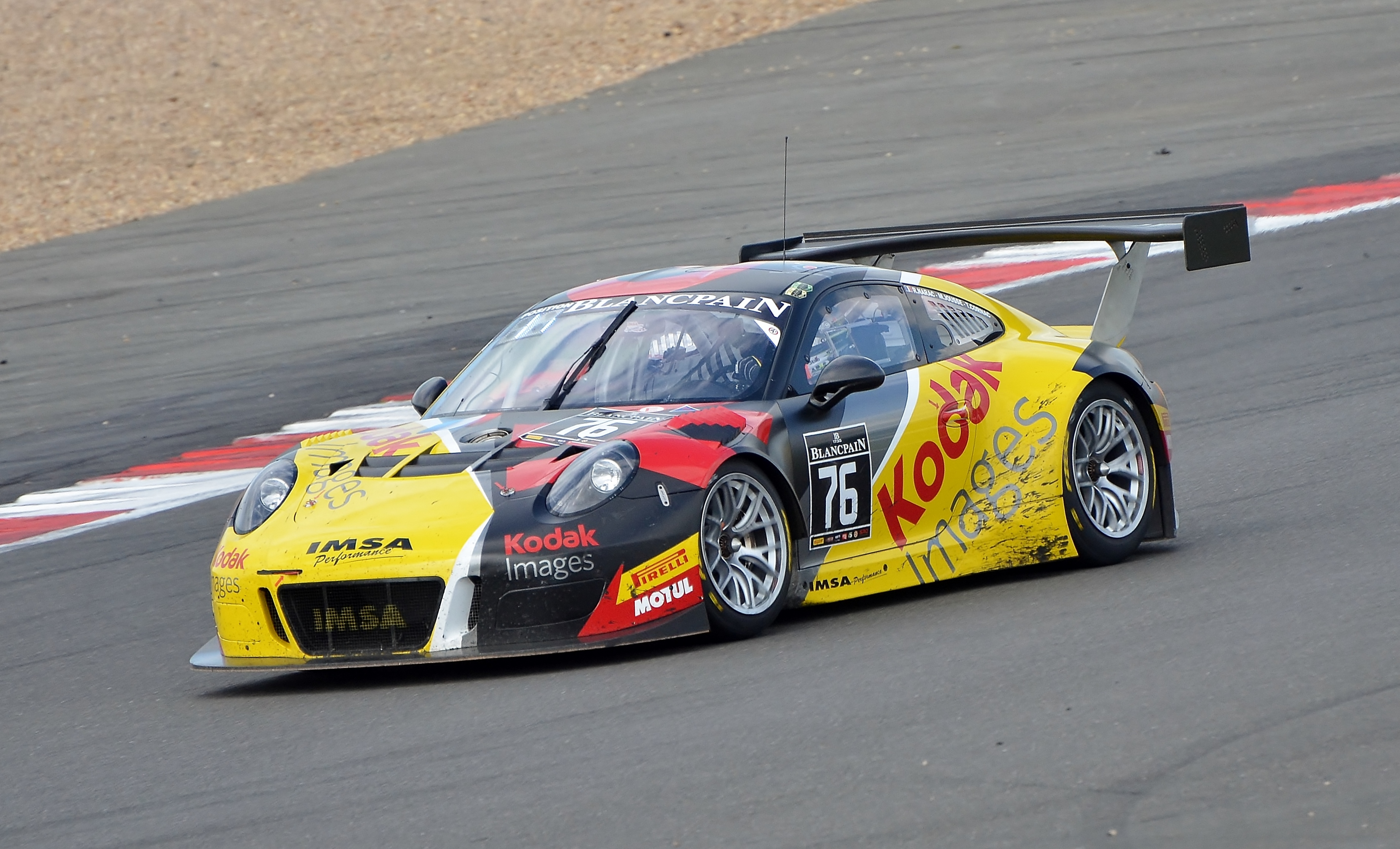
Jousse's IMSA Performance Porsche 911 GT3 R at Silverstone in 2016.

Moving to Carrera Cup Asia for 2016 with Kamlung Racing, Jousse took three wins and six other podiums but lost out on the title to Nico Menzel. During 2016, Jousse also raced for IMSA Performance in the Blancpain GT Series Endurance Cup, scoring a class win at the 24 Hours of Spa en route to 12th in the Pro-Am standings. Following a varied program in 2017, which was mainly spent in the China GT Championship, Jousse returned to Porsche Carrera Cup Asia the following year, taking four podiums and eighth in the overall standings for Absolute Racing. During 2018, Jousse also made a one-off appearance in the GT300 class of Super GT for est cola by AAS Motorsport at Buriram. After that, Jousse made select appearances in Lamborghini Super Trofeo Asia and Porsche Carrera Cup Asia for Kamlung Racing in 2019, before transitioning to a driver coach role for Yevan David and Tasanapol Inthraphuvasak at Future Management.

== Racing record ==
=== Racing career summary ===
Season	Series	Team	Races	Wins	Poles	F/Laps	Podiums	Points	Position
2007	Championnat de France FFSA Formule Campus Renault Elf		11	0	1	0	3	69	7th
2008	Formula Renault 2.0 West European Cup	Pole Services	14	0	0	0	0	5	21st
2008	Formula Junior FR2.0 Portugal	Pole Services	1	0	0	0	0	0	18th
2009	Formula Palmer Audi	MotorSport Vision	18	1	0	1	4	204	8th
2010	Formula Palmer Audi	MotorSport Vision	20	6	4	6	10	335	**2nd**
2011	Italian Formula Three Championship	BVM – Target Racing	16	1	0	1	5	112	6th
2012	FIA World Endurance Championship – LMP2	Gulf Racing Middle East	2	0	0	0	0	1.5	76th
2012	European Le Mans Series – LMP2	Status GP	1	0	0	0	0	0	NC
2012	Italian Formula Three Championship	BVM	6	0	0	0	0	37	13th
2012	Porsche Carrera Cup France	Racing Technology	2	0	0	0	0	22	19th
2013	Porsche Carrera Cup France	Sébastien Loeb Racing	12	2	0	1	5	133	4th
2013	Porsche Carrera Cup Italy	Sébastien Loeb Racing	4	1	0	1	1	0	NC†
2013	V de V Michelin Endurance Series – GT	AB Sport Auto	2	0	0	0	0	22.5	23rd
2013	V de V Endurance GT Tourisme – GTV2	AB Sport Auto	2	1	0	0	1	22	12th
2014	Porsche Carrera Cup France	Sébastien Loeb Racing	13	3	3	5	6	184	**2nd**
2014	Porsche Supercup	Sébastien Loeb Racing	2	0	0	0	0	0	NC†
2014	Belgian Racing Car Championship – Pro	WRT	1	0	1	0	1	0	NC
2014	Challenge Endurance GT Tourisme V de V	AB Sport Auto	4	0	0	0	0	53	12th
2015	Porsche Carrera Cup France	Sébastien Loeb Racing	12	3	4	3	6	176	**1st**
2015	Porsche Supercup	Sébastien Loeb Racing	2	0	0	0	0	0	NC†
2015	Challenge Endurance GT Tourisme V de V	AB Sport Auto	6	0	0	0	1	67.5	10th
2016	Porsche Carrera Cup Asia	Kamlung Racing	12	3	6	6	9	195	**2nd**
2016	Blancpain GT Series Endurance Cup – Pro-Am	IMSA Performance	4	1	0	0	1	35	12th
2016	Challenge Endurance GT Tourisme V de V	AB Sport Auto	4	0	2	2	1	127.5	9th
2017	24H Series – A6	IMSA Performance	1	0	0	0	0	0	NC
2017	V de V Endurance Series – GTV1	V de V / AB Sport Auto	1	0	1	1	0	31.5	19th
2017	China GT Championship – GT3	JRM JiaRui-TengDa	5	0	0	1	0	26	16th
2017	China GT Championship – GTC	JRM Elite	1	0	0	0	0	2	26th
2017	Blancpain GT Series Asia – Pro-Am	est cola Thailand	2	0	0	0	0	14	18th
2018	Porsche Carrera Cup Asia	Absolute Racing	7	0	0	0	4	95	8th
2018	Super GT Series – GT300	est cola by AAS Motorsport	1	0	0	0	0	0	NC
2019	Lamborghini Super Trofeo Asia – Pro	Kamlung Racing	2	1	1	1	2	28	**3rd**
2019	Porsche Carrera Cup Asia	Kamlung Racing	4	0	0	1	2	0	NC†

^{†} As Jousse was a guest driver, he was ineligible to score points.

=== Complete Italian Formula 3 Championship results ===
(key) (Races in bold indicate pole position) (Races in italics indicate fastest lap)

Year	Entrant	1	2	3	4	5	6	7	8	9	10	11	12	13	14	15	16	17	18	19	20	21	22	23	24	DC	Points
2011	BVM – Target Racing	FRA; 1; 2	FRA; 2; 11	MIS; 1; 5	MIS; 2; 5	IMO; 1; 5	IMO; 2 Ret	SPA; 1; 2	SPA; 2; 2	ADR; 1; 5	ADR; 2; 1	VLL; 1; 12	VLL; 2; 5	MUG; 1; 7	MUG; 2; 10	MNZ; 1; 3	MNZ; 2; 7									6th	112
2012	BVM	VRT; 1	VRT; 2	VRT; 3	HUN; 1	HUN; 2	HUN; 3	MUG; 1; 9	MUG; 2; 5	MUG; 3; 4	MIS; 1; 5	MIS; 2; 6	MIS; 3; 4	RBR; 1	RBR; 2	RBR; 3	IMO; 1	IMO; 2	IMO; 3	VAL; 1	VAL; 2	VAL; 3	MNZ; 1	MNZ; 2	MNZ; 3	13th	9

=== Complete FIA World Endurance Championship results ===
(key) (Races in bold indicate pole position; races in italics indicate fastest lap)

Year	Entrant	Class	Car	Engine	1	2	3	4	5	6	7	8	Pos.	Pts
2012	Gulf Racing Middle East	LMP2	Lola B12/80	Nissan VK45DE 4.5 V8	SEB; 22	SPA; 10	LMS	SIL	SÃO	BHR	FUJ	SHA	76th	1.5

=== Complete European Le Mans Series results ===
(key) (Races in bold indicate pole position; results in italics indicate fastest lap)

Year	Entrant	Class	Chassis	Engine	1	2	3	Rank	Points
2012	Status GP	LMP2	Lola B12/80	Judd-BMW HK 3.6 L V8	LEC	DON; Ret	PET	NC	0

=== Complete Porsche Supercup results ===
(key) (Races in bold indicate pole position) (Races in italics indicate fastest lap)

Year	Team	1	2	3	4	5	6	7	8	9	10	11	Pos.	Pts
2014	Sébastien Loeb Racing	CAT	MON; 12	RBR	SIL	HOC	HUN	SPA; 11	MNZ	COA	COA		NC†	0†
2015	Sébastien Loeb Racing	CAT	MON	RBR	SIL	HUN	SPA	SPA	MNZ; 14	MNZ; 14	COA	COA	NC†	0†

^{†} As Jousse was a guest driver, he was ineligible for points.

=== Complete GT World Challenge Europe results ===
==== GT World Challenge Europe Endurance Cup ====
(Races in bold indicate pole position) (Races in italics indicate fastest lap)

Year	Team	Car	Class	1	2	3	4	5	6	7	Pos.	Points
2016	IMSA Performance	Porsche 911 GT3 R	Pro-Am	MNZ; 25	SIL; 41	LEC; 23	SPA; 6H; 29	SPA; 12H; 21	SPA; 24H; 10	NÜR	12th	35

=== Complete GT World Challenge Asia results ===
(key) (Races in bold indicate pole position) (Races in italics indicate fastest lap)

Year	Team	Car	Class	1	2	3	4	5	6	7	8	9	10	11	12	DC	Pts
2017	est cola Thailand	Porsche 911 GT3 R	GT3 Pro-Am	SEP; 1	SEP; 2	BUR; 1; 8	BUR; 2; 5	SUZ; 1	SUZ; 2	FUJ; 1	FUJ; 2	SHA; 1	SHA; 2	ZHE; 1	ZHE; 2	18th	14

=== Complete Super GT results ===
Year	Team	Car	Class	1	2	3	4	5	6	7	8	DC	Points
2018	est cola by AAS Motorsport	Porsche 911 GT3 R	GT300	OKA	FUJ1	SUZ	BUR; 14	FUJ2	AUT	SUG	MOT	NC	0
