= 2009 Formula Renault 2.0 West European Cup =

Motor racing competition

Seasons
- ← 2008 none →

The 2009 Formula Renault 2.0 West European Cup was the second and final season of the WEC series. It included the French Formula Renault championship rewarding the best French driver (F) and reward also the Rookies driver (R).

== Teams and drivers ==
Team	No.	Driver name	Rounds
(France) SG Formula	1	(France) Jean-Éric Vergne	All
(France) SG Formula	2	(Spain) Miki Monrás	All
(France) SG Formula	3	(France) Hugo Valente	All
(France) SG Formula	4	(France) Arthur Pic	All
(France) SG Formula	5	(New Zealand) Dominic Storey	1-2
(France) SG Driver's Project	6	(France) Julien Abelli	1-5
(France) SG Driver's Project	7	(United Arab Emirates) Ramez Azzam	1-5
(France) SG Driver's Project	8	(France) Kévin Breysse	1-3
(France) Pole Services	9	(France) Benjamin Lariche	All
(France) Pole Services	10	(France) Bastien Borget	1
(France) Pole Services	43	(France) Jérôme Sornicle	3
(Spain) Epsilon Euskadi	11	(France) Nathanaël Berthon	All
(Spain) Epsilon Euskadi	12	(Colombia) Carlos Muñoz	All
(Spain) Epsilon Euskadi	14	(Spain) Albert Costa	All
(Spain) Epsilon Euskadi	16	(Spain) Miguel Otegui	3-7
(France) Epsilon Sport	28	(United Kingdom) Luciano Bacheta	3
(France) Epsilon Sport	54	(France) Arno Santamato	3
(United States) KEO Racing	30	(United States) Bob Siska	2
(France) Lycée d'Artagnan	32	(France) Daniel Harout	1
(India) TCS Racing	33	(France) Grégoire Demoustier	1
(Switzerland) Jenzer Motorsport	52	(Switzerland) Zoel Amberg	1
(Spain) Amiter Galuppo Sport	70	(Spain) Marcelo Conchado	2, 4, 6

== Race calendar and results ==
Round		Circuit	Date	Pole position	Fastest lap	Winning driver	Winning team
1	1	(France) Circuit Paul Armagnac	April 11	(France) Jean-Éric Vergne	(Spain) Miki Monrás	(France) Jean-Éric Vergne	(France) SG Formula
1	2	(France) Circuit Paul Armagnac	April 12	(France) Jean-Éric Vergne	(France) Arthur Pic	(France) Jean-Éric Vergne	(France) SG Formula
2	3	(Spain) Circuit de Catalunya	April 18	(France) Arthur Pic	(Spain) Albert Costa	(France) Jean-Éric Vergne	(France) SG Formula
2	4	(Spain) Circuit de Catalunya	April 19	(France) Julien Abelli	(Spain) Albert Costa	(France) Julien Abelli	(France) SG Driver's Project
3	5	(France) Circuit de Pau	May 16	(Spain) Albert Costa	(Spain) Albert Costa	(Spain) Albert Costa	(Spain) Epsilon Euskadi
3	6	(France) Circuit de Pau	May 17	(Spain) Albert Costa	(Spain) Albert Costa	(Spain) Albert Costa	(Spain) Epsilon Euskadi
4	7	(France) Circuit de Nevers Magny-Cours	May 30	(France) Nathanaël Berthon	(Spain) Albert Costa	(Spain) Albert Costa	(Spain) Epsilon Euskadi
4	8	(France) Circuit de Nevers Magny-Cours	May 31	(Spain) Albert Costa	(Spain) Albert Costa	(Spain) Albert Costa	(Spain) Epsilon Euskadi
5	9	(Belgium) Circuit de Spa-Francorchamps	June 5	(Spain) Albert Costa	(Spain) Albert Costa	(France) Nathanaël Berthon	(Spain) Epsilon Euskadi
5	10	(Belgium) Circuit de Spa-Francorchamps	June 6	(Spain) Albert Costa	(France) Nathanaël Berthon	(Spain) Albert Costa	(Spain) Epsilon Euskadi
6	11	(Spain) Valencia Street Circuit	October 10	(France) Jean-Éric Vergne	(Spain) Albert Costa	(France) Jean-Éric Vergne	(France) SG Formula
6	12	(Spain) Valencia Street Circuit	October 11	(France) Jean-Éric Vergne	(France) Jean-Éric Vergne	(France) Jean-Éric Vergne	(France) SG Formula
7	13	(Portugal) Autódromo Internacional do Algarve	November 7	(Spain) Miki Monrás	(Spain) Albert Costa	(Spain) Albert Costa	(Spain) Epsilon Euskadi
7	14	(Portugal) Autódromo Internacional do Algarve	November 8	(Spain) Albert Costa	(Spain) Albert Costa	(Spain) Albert Costa	(Spain) Epsilon Euskadi

== Results and standings ==
Race point system
Position	1st	2nd	3rd	4th	5th	6th	7th	8th	9th	10th
Points	15	12	10	8	6	5	4	3	2	1

- Races : 2 race by rounds (first between 60 and 80 km, second between 20 and 30 minutes).

=== Drivers ===
Pos	Driver	(France) NOG		(Spain) CAT		(France) PAU		(France) MAG		(Belgium) SPA		(Spain) VAL		(Portugal) ALG		Points
Pos	Driver	1	2	3	4	5	6	7	8	9	10	11	12	13	14	Points
1	(Spain) Albert Costa	5	4	2	10	1	1	1	1	Ret	1	2	2	1	1	172
2	(France) Jean-Éric Vergne	1	1	1	2	Ret	10	8	3	2	3	1	1	3	6	143
3	(France) Nathanaël Berthon	6	7	5	5	3	3	2	2	1	2	3	4	Ret	4	120
4	(Spain) Miki Monrás	2	3	4	3	5	6	Ret	4	3	4	7	3	2	2	117
5	(France) Julien Abelli	7	2	6	1	4	4	3	6	7	6					77
6	(France) Arthur Pic	4	12	3	4	Ret	7	Ret	Ret	Ret	8	5	5	4	3	65
7	(Colombia) Carlos Muñoz	10	14	13	8	2	2	4	9	6	10	4	7	Ret	7	60
8	(Spain) Miguel Otegui					Ret	11	6	5	4	Ret	6	6	6	5	40
9	(United Arab Emirates) Ramez Azzam	3	10	9	9	7	8	5	7	Ret	5					38
10	(France) Benjamin Lariche	9	8	10	6	10	Ret	7	8	5	9	10	9	7	9	36
11	(France) Hugo Valente	13	11	7	7	9	Ret	Ret	Ret	Ret	7	8	8	5	8	29
12	(France) Kevin Breysse	8	5	12	11	8	9									14
13	(United Kingdom) Luciano Bacheta					6	5									11
14	(New Zealand) Dominic Storey	12	6	8	Ret											8
15	(Spain) Marcello Conchado			Ret	13			9	Ret			9	Ret			4
16	(France) Bastien Borget	Ret	9													2
17	(France) Jérôme Sornicle					11	12									0
18	(Switzerland) Zoël Amberg			11	12											0
19	(France) Daniel Harout	11	13													0
20	(France) Arno Santamato					12	13									0
21	(United States) Robert Siska			14	14											0
22	(France) Grégoire Demoustier	14	Ret													0

=== Teams ===
Pos	Team	Points
1	(Spain) Epsilon Euskadi	242
2	(France) SG Formula	212
3	(France) SG Driver's Project	101
4	(France) Pole Services	32
5	(France) Epsilon Sport	11
6	(Spain) Amiter Galuppo Sport	4
NC	(Switzerland) Jenzer Motorsport	0
NC	(United States) KEO Racing	0
NC	(India) TCS Racing	0
NC	(France) Lycée d'Artagnan	0

=== French Formula Renault championship ===
Pos	Driver	Points
1	(France) Nathanaël Berthon	108
2	(France) Jean-Éric Vergne	93
3	(France) Julien Abelli	67
4	(France) Arthur Pic	47
5	(France) Benjamin Lariche	47
6	(France) Kevin Breysse	34
7	(France) Hugo Valente	31
8	(France) Jérôme Sornicle	10
9	(France) Arno Santamato	8
10	(France) Daniel Harout	6
11	(France) Bastien Borget	5
12	(France) Grégoire Demoustier	2

=== Rookies championship ===
Pos	Driver	Points
1	(France) Arthur Pic	110
2	(France) Hugo Valente	93
3	(France) Kevin Breysse	70
4	(New Zealand) Dominic Storey	32
5	(France) Arno Santamato	32
6	(Switzerland) Zoël Amberg	16
7	(France) Grégoire Demoustier	6
