= Jean-Éric Vergne =

French racing driver (born 1990)

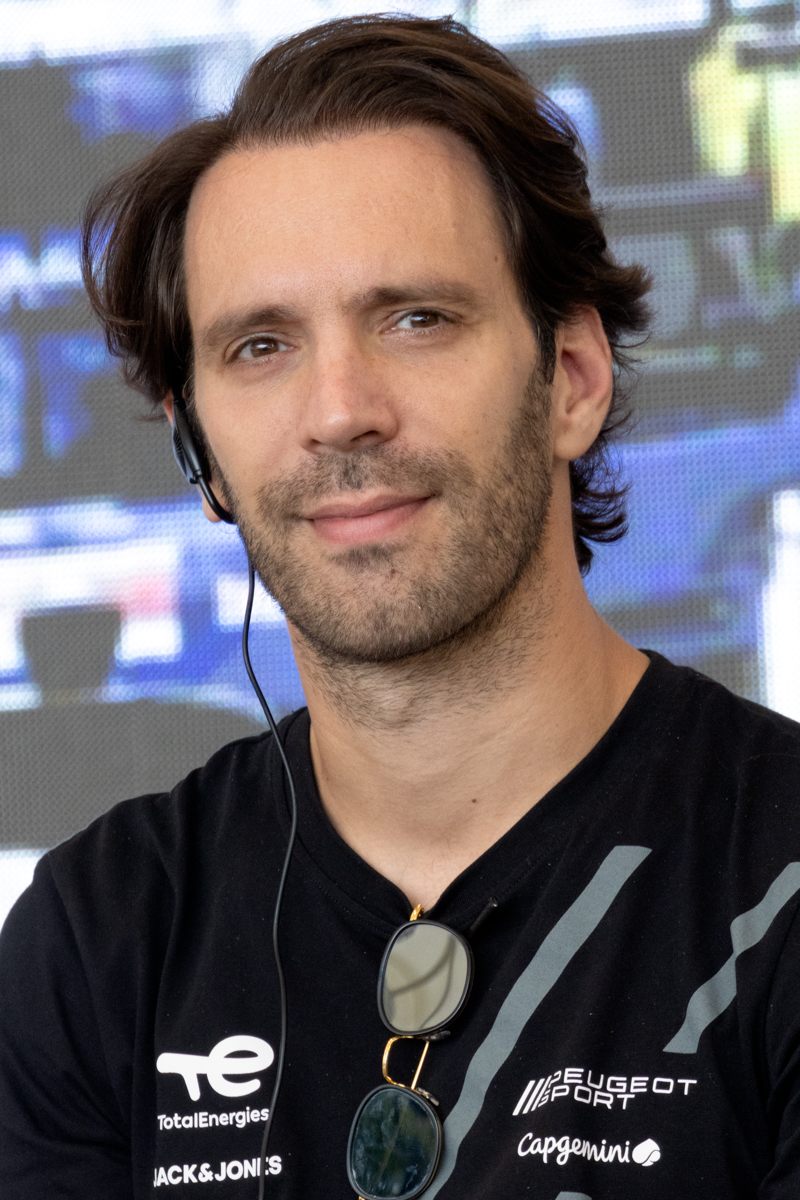
- Vergne at the 2024 6 Hours of Fuji
- Born: Jean-Éric Serge Raymond Vergne; 25 April 1990 (age 36); Pontoise, France

Formula E career
- Debut season: 2014–15
- Current team: Citroën
- Categorisation: FIA Platinum
- Car number: 27 (2014–2015); 25 (2015–present)
- Former teams: Andretti, Virgin, Techeetah, DS Penske
- Starts: 151
- Championships: 2 (2017–18, 2018–19)
- Wins: 11
- Podiums: 38
- Poles: 17
- Fastest laps: 6
- Finished last season: 6th (99 pts)
- Statistics up to date as of 28 July 2025.

FIA World Endurance Championship career
- Debut season: 2017
- Current team: Peugeot TotalEnergies
- Categorisation: FIA Platinum
- Car number: 93
- Former teams: Manor, TDS
- Starts: 33
- Championships: 0
- Wins: 0
- Podiums: 4
- Poles: 0
- Fastest laps: 1
- Best finish: 8th in 2023 (HY)

Formula One World Championship career
- Nationality: France
- Active years: 2012–2014
- Team: Toro Rosso
- Car number: 25
- Entries: 58
- Championships: 0
- Wins: 0
- Podiums: 0
- Career points: 51
- Pole positions: 0
- Fastest laps: 0
- First entry: 2012 Australian Grand Prix
- Last entry: 2014 Abu Dhabi Grand Prix

24 Hours of Le Mans career
- Years: 2017–2020, 2023–2024
- Teams: Manor, G-Drive, Peugeot
- Best finish: 7th (2017)
- Class wins: 0

Previous series
- 2010–2011 2010 2010 2008–2009 2008–2009 2007: Formula Renault 3.5; British F3; GP3 Series; Formula Renault Eurocup; Formula Renault WEC; French FRenault Campus

Championship titles
- 2010 2008 2007: British F3; French Formula Renault; French FRenault Campus

Jean-Éric Serge Raymond Vergne (French pronunciation: [ʒɑ̃.e.ʁik sɛʁʒ ʁe.mɔ̃ vɛʁɲ]; born 25 April 1990), also known by his initials JEV, is a French racing driver, who currently competes in the FIA World Endurance Championship for Peugeot and in Formula E for the Citroën Formula E Team. Vergne also competed in Formula One from 2012 to 2014, and has won a record two Formula E Championship titles with Techeetah (later shared with Pascal Wehrlein).

Vergne became the 2017–18 ABB Formula E Champion, after clinching fifth in the New York ePrix in 2018, and he became the first Formula E driver to win two consecutive championships after his repeat success in the 2018–19 season. He competed in Formula One for Scuderia Toro Rosso from 2012 to 2014, and was a Ferrari test and development driver from 2015 to 2016. He won the British Formula 3 Championship in 2010 and then finished runner up to teammate Robert Wickens in the 2011 Formula Renault 3.5 Series season.

== Early life and career ==
Jean-Éric Serge Raymond Vergne was born on 25 April 1990 in Pontoise, France.

=== Karting ===
Vergne started competing in karting at the age of four at his dad's kart circuit near Paris. He entered his first competition in 2000 and became French champion in the "kids" ("Minimes") category in 2001. Three years later, he became runner–up in the French Rotax Max championship. In 2005, he finished as runner-up in the ICA class of the European Championship, behind James Calado, with the highlight of his karting career coming the following year when he finished seventh in the premier KF1 World Championship, held at Angerville, another track near Paris.

=== Formula Renault 1.6 and 2.0 ===
In 2007, Vergne moved up to single-seater racing, joining the French Formula Renault Campus series which he won comfortably at the first attempt, taking ten podium places from thirteen races in the process. Vergne became a member of both the renowned Red Bull Junior Team and the French Automobile Sport Federation (FFSA), at the conclusion of the 2007 season.

The following season, Vergne competed in both the Eurocup Formula Renault 2.0 and Formula Renault 2.0 West European Cup championships for SG Formula. He finished sixth in the Eurocup standings, taking nine points scoring positions in fourteen races, including a podium in the final race of the season at Barcelona. In the West European Cup, he took fourth place in the championship, scoring three podium places.

In both series, Vergne finished as the highest placed rookie driver, and in addition, he also won the French Formula Renault 2.0 title, which was awarded to the best French driver in the West European Cup standings.

For 2009, Vergne remained in both championships with SG Formula. He finished second behind Spain's Albert Costa in both the Eurocup, and the WEC.

=== Formula Three ===
2010 saw Vergne move to the British Formula 3 Championship, competing for multiple champions Carlin. He took twelve victories from the first 24 races, including a clean sweep of three victories at the Spa-Francorchamps round. This was enough to give him the title with six races remaining in the season. It was the third consecutive year that a driver from the Red Bull Junior Team had won the title with Carlin, following on from Jaime Alguersuari in 2008 and Daniel Ricciardo in 2009.

During the season, Vergne also contested the two main non-championship Formula Three races, the Masters of Formula 3 at Zandvoort, where he finished just off the podium in fourth, and the Macau Grand Prix where he finished in seventh position. On both occasions, he was also the highest placed finisher from the British series.

=== GP3 Series ===
In May 2010, Vergne was signed by Tech 1 Racing to contest the opening GP3 Series round in Barcelona. He was replaced by countryman Jim Pla for the next round in Turkey as it clashed dates with the British Formula 3 event at Hockenheim, but returned to the team for the following round in Valencia. However, in early July it was announced that Daniel Juncadella would take Vergne's seat at the team for the remainder of the season.

=== Formula Renault 3.5 Series and return to GP3 ===
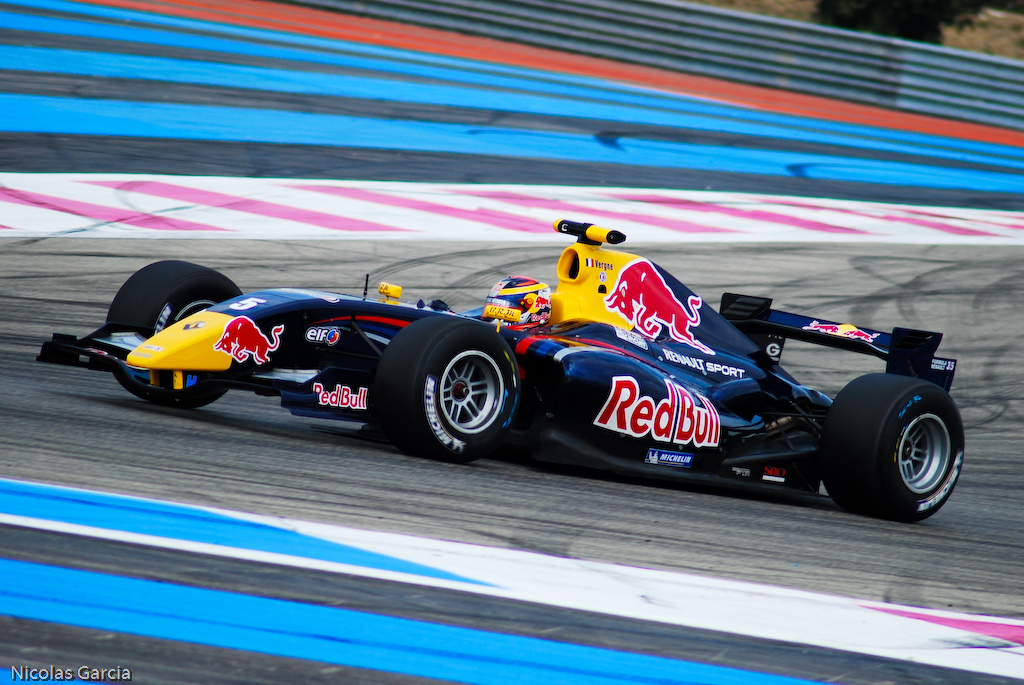
Vergne at the penultimate round of the 2011 Formula Renault 3.5 Series season, at Paul Ricard

Along with his Formula Three campaign, Vergne had been due to compete in the Formula Renault 3.5 Series for SG Formula. However, SG Formula pulled out a week before the first race, meaning that Vergne could concentrate on his Formula Three campaign.

In July 2010, it was announced that Vergne would replace Brendon Hartley at Tech 1 Racing for the final three events of the season after Hartley was released by the Red Bull Junior Team. Despite only taking part in those meetings, Vergne finished 8th in the championship with four podium places, including his first series win at Silverstone after original race winner Esteban Guerrieri was disqualified for a technical infringement.

Vergne graduated to the series full-time in 2011, switching from Tech 1 Racing to Carlin. After winning the second race at the Monza round in May, Vergne was given a time penalty and demoted to third place after he was adjudged to have cut a chicane in order to maintain the lead of the race. However, after an appeal by his Carlin team, the Italian Motorsports Commission (CSAI) overturned the penalty and reinstated Vergne to the victory.

Going into the final round of the season in Barcelona, Vergne trailed series leader and teammate Robert Wickens by two points, having taken five race victories including a double win at the Hungaroring. In the final race of the season, Wickens and Vergne collided on the opening lap, sending Wickens into retirement. Although Vergne was able to continue, he was later taken out of the race by Mofaz Racing's Fairuz Fauzy, handing the title to Wickens by just nine points.

== Formula One ==
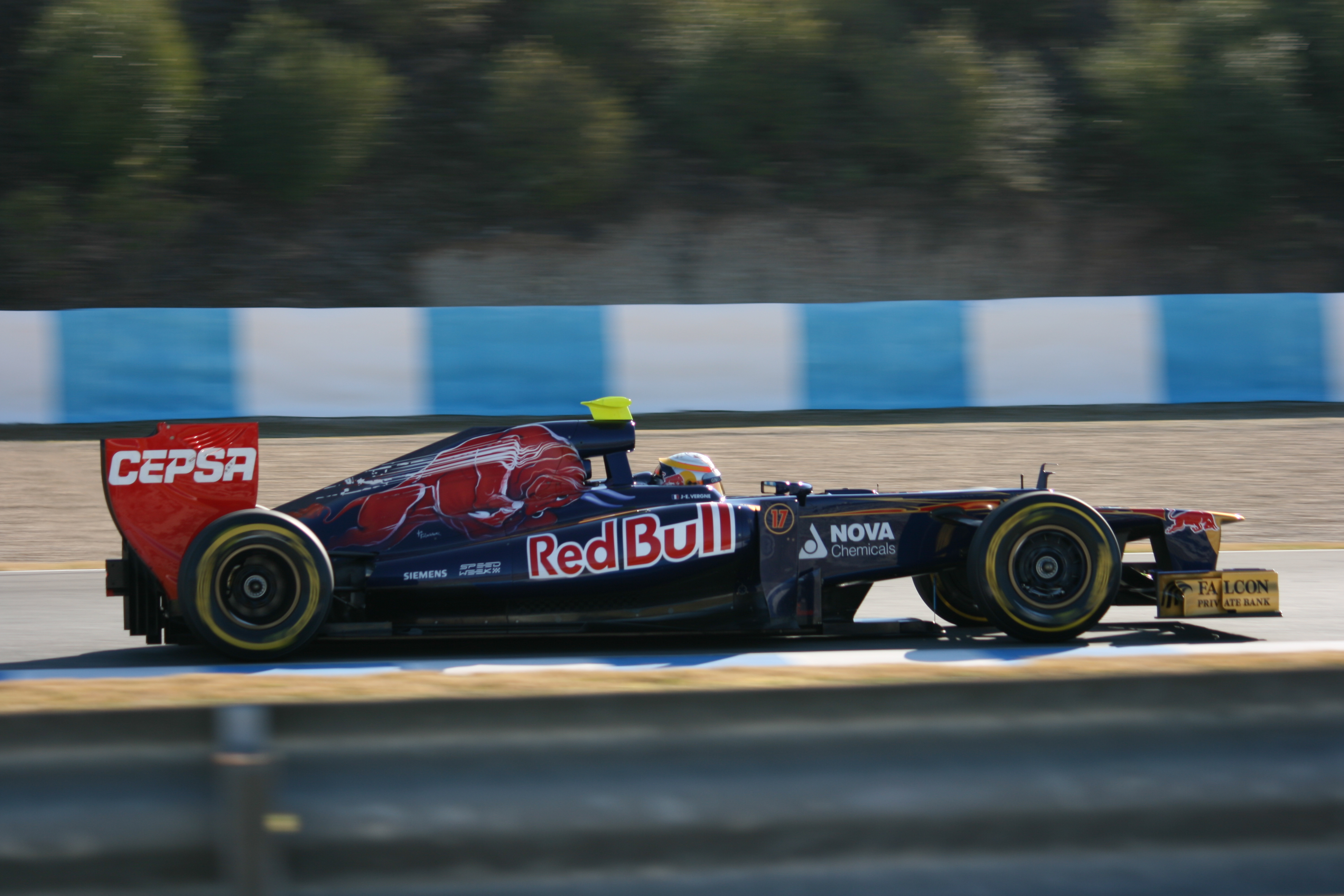
Vergne during pre-season testing, for Toro Rosso, at Jerez in February 2012

Vergne had his first outing in a Formula One car at the Goodwood Festival of Speed in July 2010, driving a Red Bull RB5. In September 2010, it was announced that he would drive for Toro Rosso in the post-season young driver test to be held at the Yas Marina Circuit in November, with the team later confirming that he would drive the Toro Rosso STR5 for both days of the test. On the first day of the test he set the seventh fastest time with a lap of 1:42.489, completing 93 laps in the process.

On the second day of the test, Vergne finished ninth fastest with a lap time of 1:40.974, just 0.030 seconds behind the Williams of new GP2 champion Pastor Maldonado. As well as suffering an engine-related issue which limited his running, he also had to leave the test early to travel to Macau for the end-of-season Formula Three race.

In August 2011, during the Belgian Grand Prix weekend, it was confirmed that Vergne would participate in selected first practice sessions later in the season for Toro Rosso, with the team later confirming that he would take part in three of the final four race weekends, beginning at the Korean Grand Prix. He did not take part in practice at the Indian Grand Prix to allow race drivers Jaime Alguersuari and Sébastien Buemi the maximum track time at the brand new circuit. Vergne was eleventh fastest during free practice at the Abu Dhabi Grand Prix, less than 0.3 seconds off the pace of Alguersuari, who was in the other STR6.

In November 2011, Vergne tested the title-winning Red Bull RB7 at the young driver test in Abu Dhabi, setting the fastest lap time on all three days.

=== Toro Rosso (2012–2014) ===
==== 2012 season ====
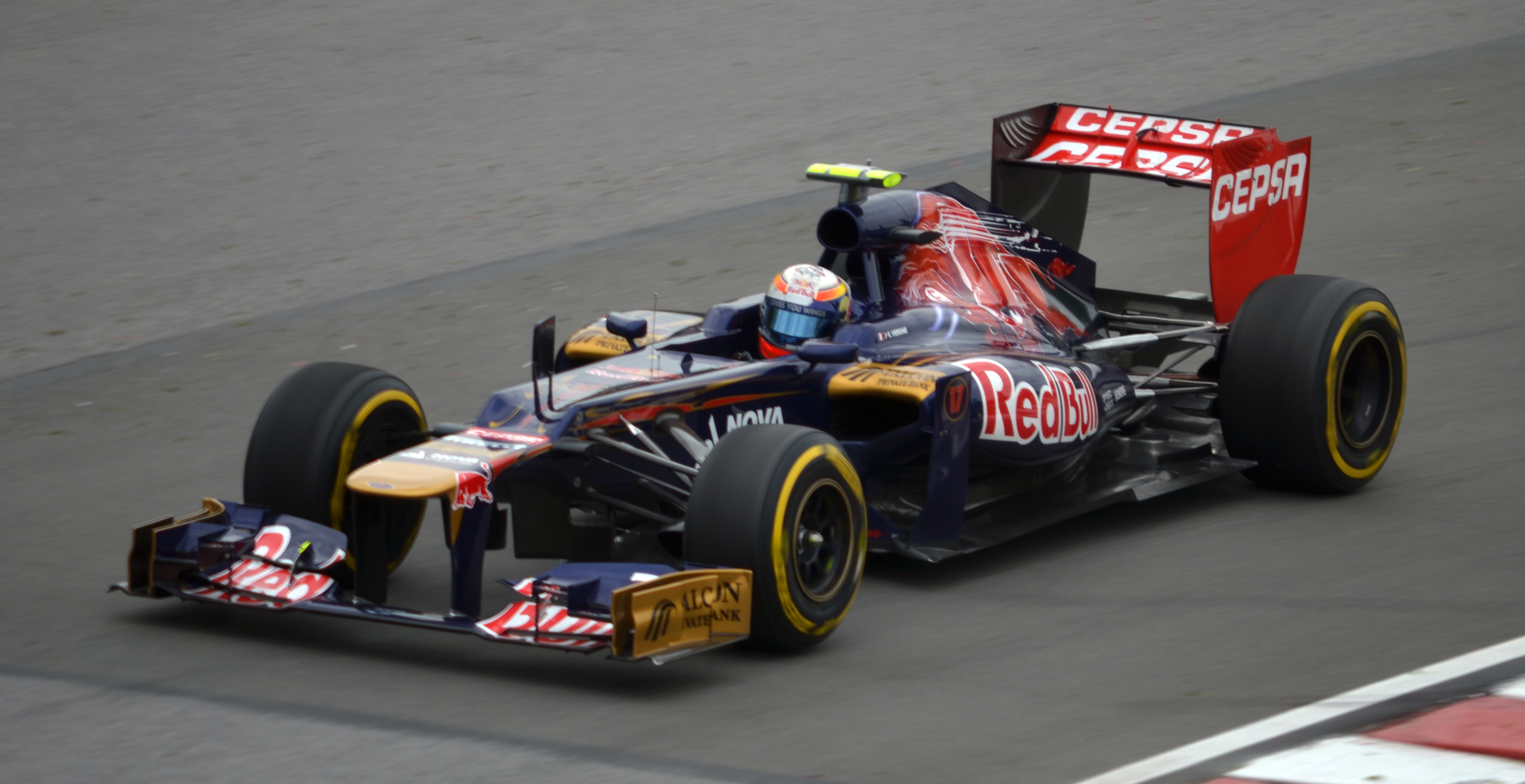
Vergne driving for Toro Rosso at the 2012 Canadian Grand Prix

On 14 December 2011, it was officially confirmed that Vergne would race for Toro Rosso in the 2012 season, alongside fellow Red Bull Junior Team member Daniel Ricciardo. After qualifying and finishing in eleventh place at the season-opening Australian Grand Prix, Vergne scored his first World Championship points at the following race in Malaysia by finishing eighth in a rain-affected race. In the European Grand Prix, he turned into the car of Heikki Kovalainen from outside of the racing line during an overtake attempt, damaging both cars severely and scattering enough debris on the track that the safety car had to be deployed. After the race the stewards found that the accident had been avoidable and that Vergne had caused the accident. He would receive a 10-position double-penalty to his qualification result at the British Grand Prix, along with a €25,000 fine.

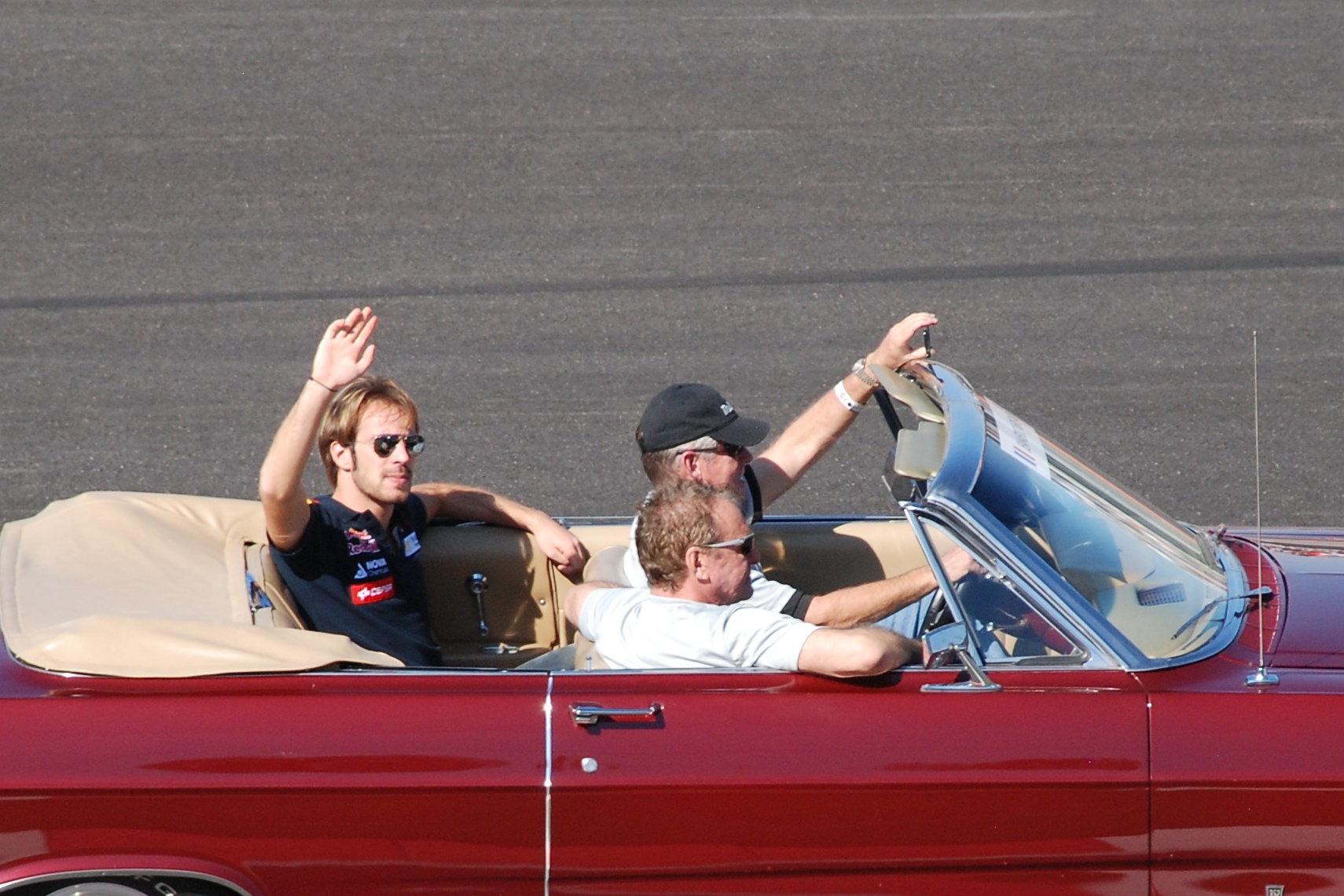
Vergne at the 2012 United States Grand Prix

This also proved to be Vergne's first race retirement in Formula One as he had finished consistently at the previous seven races on the schedule. He would not score points again until the Belgian Grand Prix, but scored again four races later, at the Korean Grand Prix and then finally at the season-ending race, the Brazilian Grand Prix. Vergne finished the season in 17th in the Drivers' Championship with 16 points, the total being accrued with four eighth-place finishes. Despite not scoring points as frequently as Daniel Ricciardo, he finished the season ahead of Ricciardo.

==== 2013 season ====
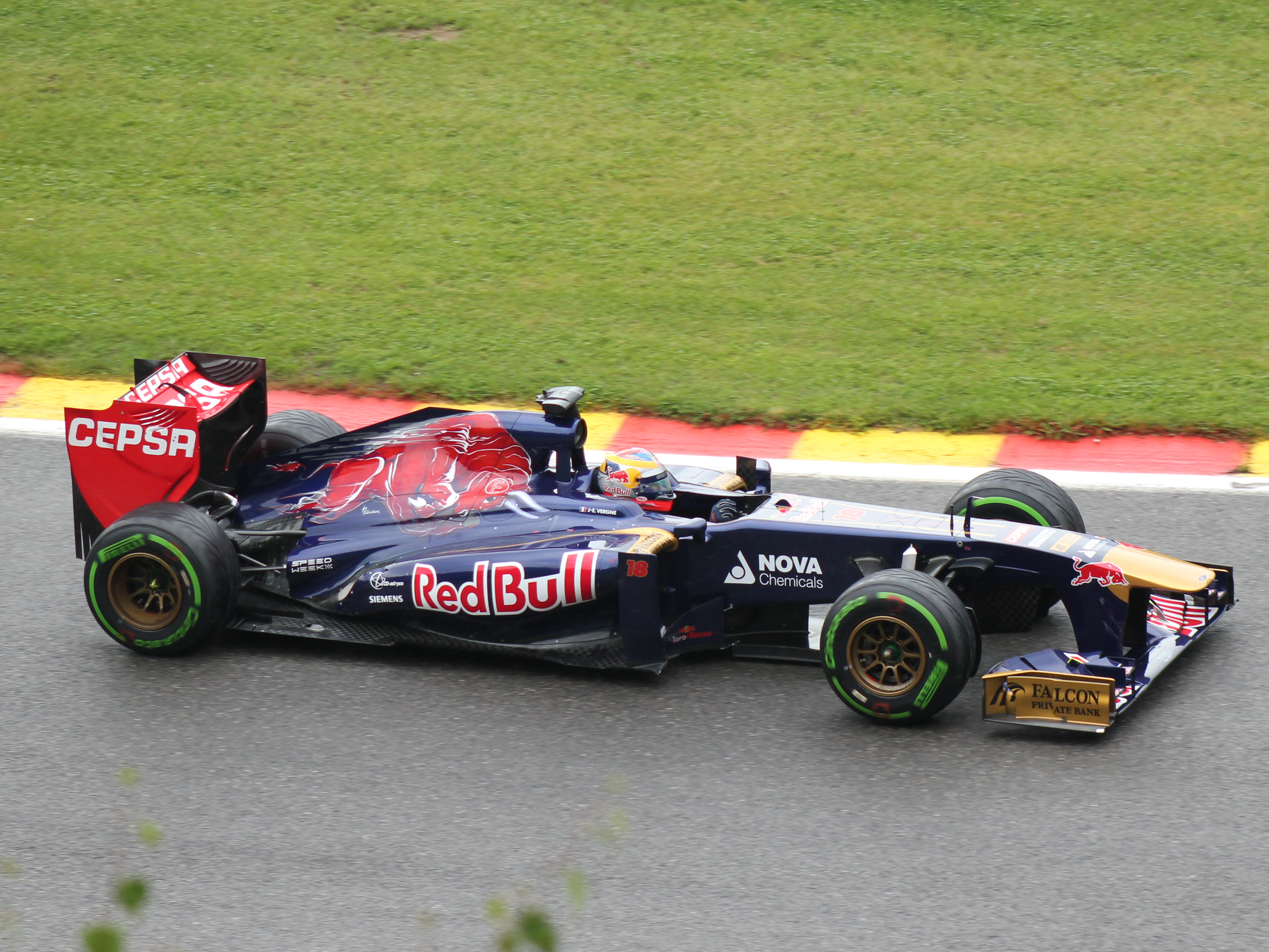
Vergne at the 2013 Belgian Grand Prix

Vergne started the season with a twelfth-place finish at the Australian Grand Prix, before taking his first point of the season with tenth place in Malaysia, despite contact with the Caterham of Charles Pic. Vergne did not score points again until the Monaco Grand Prix, where he finished the race in eighth place, matching the best result of his career. Vergne had the best qualifying of his career for the Canadian Grand Prix, when he qualified seventh on the grid, before going on to take a career best finish of sixth the following day, in the race. The rest of the season was a nightmare with a highest finish of 12th with three retirements, finishing the final race in 15th place and 15th in the standings with a total of thirteen points while Ricciardo outshone him to earn 20 points.

==== 2014 season ====
It was announced in 2013 that Vergne would drive again for Toro Rosso alongside rookie, 19-year-old Daniil Kvyat, who replaced Ricciardo at the team. Vergne qualified well in the season opener in Australia in sixth place beating champions Kimi Räikkönen, Sebastian Vettel and Jenson Button and he finished the race just ahead of his teammate in ninth, however after Daniel Ricciardo was disqualified, he moved up to eighth place. In Malaysia he qualified ninth but did not finish the race after getting a poor start and colliding with the Marussia and Caterham while his rookie teammate Kvyat finished tenth. Vergne then retired again in the following race in Bahrain. At the Chinese Grand Prix, Vergne qualified in ninth while Kvyat qualified 13th in the wet conditions. Vergne again had a poor start and finished in 12th place while Kvyat scored again in tenth place.

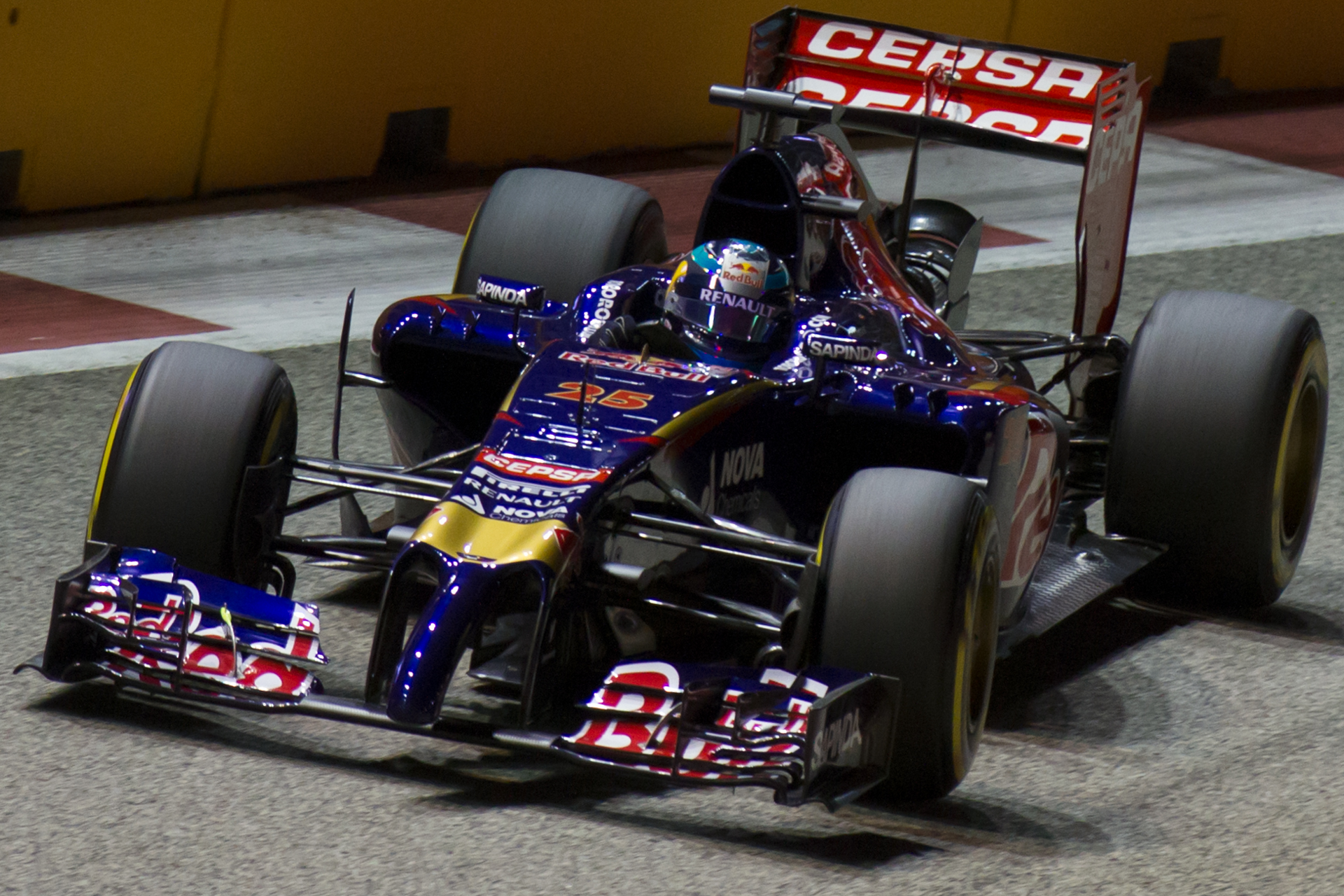
Vergne at the 2014 Singapore Grand Prix

As the calendar moved to Europe for the Spanish Grand Prix, Vergne's luck did not improve. A wheel was not properly fitted in Friday practice ending his session early and earning him a ten-place grid penalty. As a result, he started from 21st position, only ahead of Pastor Maldonado who crashed in Q1. Vergne got off to a decent start getting through the Marussias and Caterhams while pulling away from Maldonado, but he retired for the third time in five races due to technical problems. At the Austrian Grand Prix, Vergne retired for the fifth time in eight races, after finishing the previous race in Canada in eighth place. In the following race at Silverstone, Vergne was able to get in to Q3 for the sixth time, finishing the race in tenth. In Hungary, Vergne qualified eighth in changing conditions, but in the race he managed to get as high as second after pitting after a safety car; he held position in front of a battle which included Nico Rosberg, Sebastian Vettel and Lewis Hamilton. However, after his second stop he dropped back to eventually finish in ninth place.

At the Singapore Grand Prix, Vergne was able to equal his best-ever Formula One result with a sixth-place finish after a late charge which saw him pass Nico Hülkenberg, Kimi Räikkönen and Valtteri Bottas in the last four laps of the race, despite two five-second time penalties. In Japan, Vergne finished ninth in worsening wet conditions despite starting 20th on the grid. At the Russian Grand Prix, he qualified ninth while Kvyat started fifth for his home race. At the start of the race, Vergne climbed to fifth and pulled a move around the outside of Kevin Magnussen at turn three on the third lap. However, Vergne slowly dropped back, finishing 13th, directly ahead of Kvyat.

In August, Red Bull announced that Kvyat would be joined in the Toro Rosso team by Max Verstappen for 2015, leaving Vergne without a drive for the 2015 season. However, after Sebastian Vettel left Red Bull, it was announced that Kvyat would replace him, leaving a possible seat for Vergne at Toro Rosso for 2015. On 26 November 2014 however, Vergne announced that he would be leaving Toro Rosso for 2015, and Carlos Sainz Jr. would replace him.

=== Test driver at Ferrari (2015–2016) ===
On 19 December 2014, it was announced that Vergne would join Ferrari in 2015, as test and development driver particularly in respect of simulator work. He left Ferrari in February 2017.

== Formula E ==
=== Andretti Autosport (2014–2015) ===
==== 2014–15 season ====
After being unable to secure a full-time drive for the 2015 Formula One season, he switched to the FIA Formula E Championship and signed for Andretti Autosport. Vergne made his debut in the third race of the season in Uruguay and secured pole position. Vergne was overtaken at the start by Nelson Piquet Jr., and he retook the lead on lap 12. After the pit stops Vergne conceded the lead to Sébastien Buemi, but he attacked Buemi until retiring due to a broken suspension two laps before the end of the race. He achieved his first podium in Long Beach, finishing second behind race winner Piquet. He finished third in the first race at the London ePrix, passing Piquet and Lucas di Grassi in the process. In the second race, he finished 16th after receiving a drive-through penalty. He ultimately finished seventh in the final championship standings, with 70 points.

=== DS Virgin Racing (2015–2016) ===
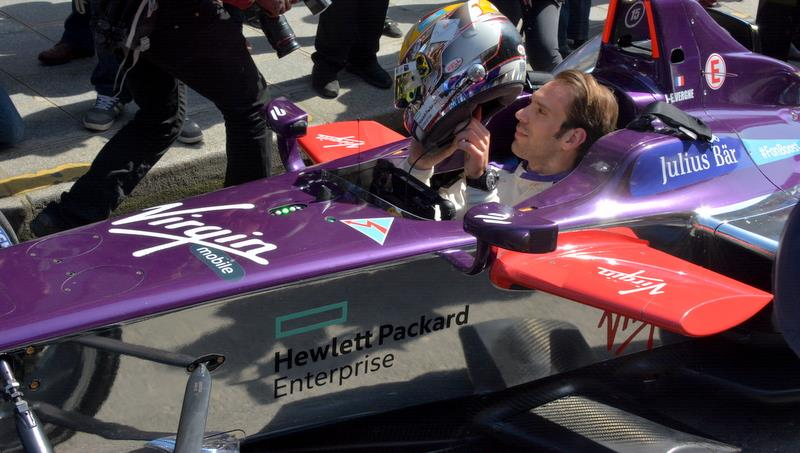
Vergne in his DS Virgin Racing Formula E car

==== 2015–16 season ====
On 8 August 2015, it was announced that Vergne would join the DS Virgin Racing team for the 2015–16 Formula E season, partnering Sam Bird. Vergne struggled to compete with Bird and finished ninth in the championship.

=== Techeetah (2016–2022) ===
==== 2016–17 season ====
In July 2016, it was announced Vergne would compete with the newly formed Techeetah, following their acquisition of Team Aguri. Vergne went on to score the first podiums, fastest lap award and the team's first win at the 2016–17 season finale in Montréal.

==== 2017–18 season ====
Vergne was confirmed to continue with the team in the 2017–18 season. He scored his second win at the 2018 Santiago ePrix, and achieved his third win in his Formula E career at the 2018 Punta del Este ePrix. After stringing together a consistent run of points finishes, Vergne clinched the title with a race to spare in New York, becoming the fourth different driver's champion in four seasons.

==== 2018–19 season ====
For the 2018–19 season Vergne stayed with Techeetah and won 3 races in Sanya, Monaco and Bern. He also became champion for the second year in a row, becoming Formula E's first repeat champion.

==== 2019–20 season ====
It was announced that in the 2019–20 season, Vergne would be racing alongside António Félix da Costa, who would replace the TAG Heuer Porsche Formula E Team bound André Lotterer (who was his teammate from 2017 to 2019). After two points finishes and two retirements, Vergne scored his first podium finish in Marrakesh despite missing FP1 due to a fever. Super GT and Super Formula veteran James Rossiter took his place during FP1. After a brief hiatus to the season due to the COVID-19 pandemic, Vergne scored two podium finishes in two of the six rounds in the Berlin, finishing third in round three, and scoring his first victory of the season in round four. He would ultimately finish third in the championship standings, just one point behind Stoffel Vandoorne.

==== 2020–21 season ====
Vergne remained with DS Techeetah for the 2020-21 season. Vergne failed to score in Diriyah and won the first race in Rome, leaving Italy with 25 points after four races. Vergne failed to finish in the first race in Puebla after being squeezed into the wall after activating attack mode. Vergne took second in New York on day 1 but remained in the 24th slot on the grid after the lights went out the next day, giving him his second DNF. Vergne again failed to score in London and finished the season in tenth with 80 points, 19 behind De Vries who won the championship.

==== 2021–22 season ====
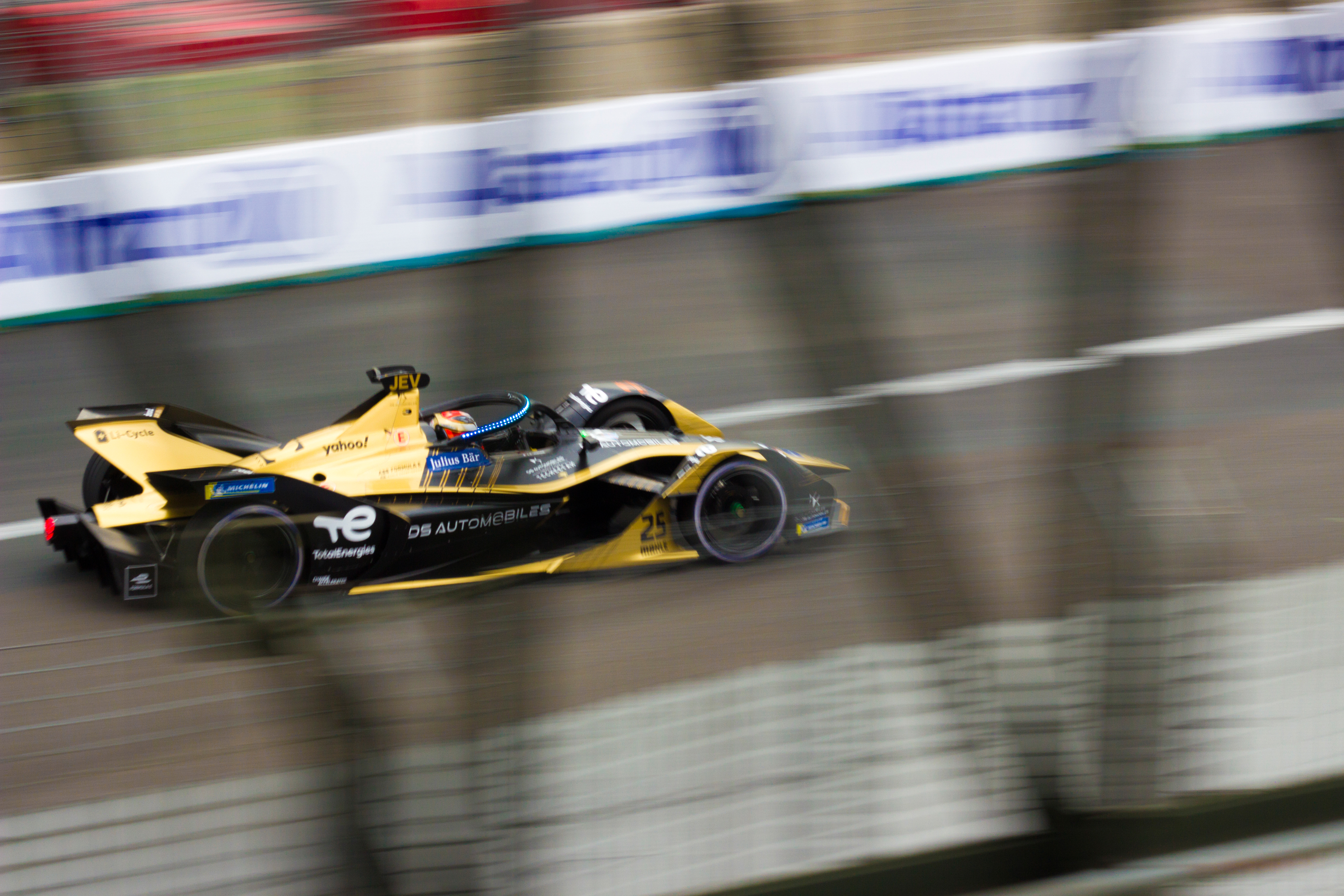
Vergne during the 2022 Mexico City ePrix, where he finished in third place

Vergne stayed with DS Techeetah for a sixth straight season. Vergne got twelve points from Diriyah and took third in Mexico. His two poles were in the second race in Rome and Jakarta, finishing second in both to Mitch Evans and scored two more podiums in Monaco and Berlin in between. Vergne had a DNF in both second races in New York and London, both from contact. Vergne finished sixth in both races in Seoul, which meant he finished the season in fourth with 144 points.

=== DS Penske (2023–2025) ===
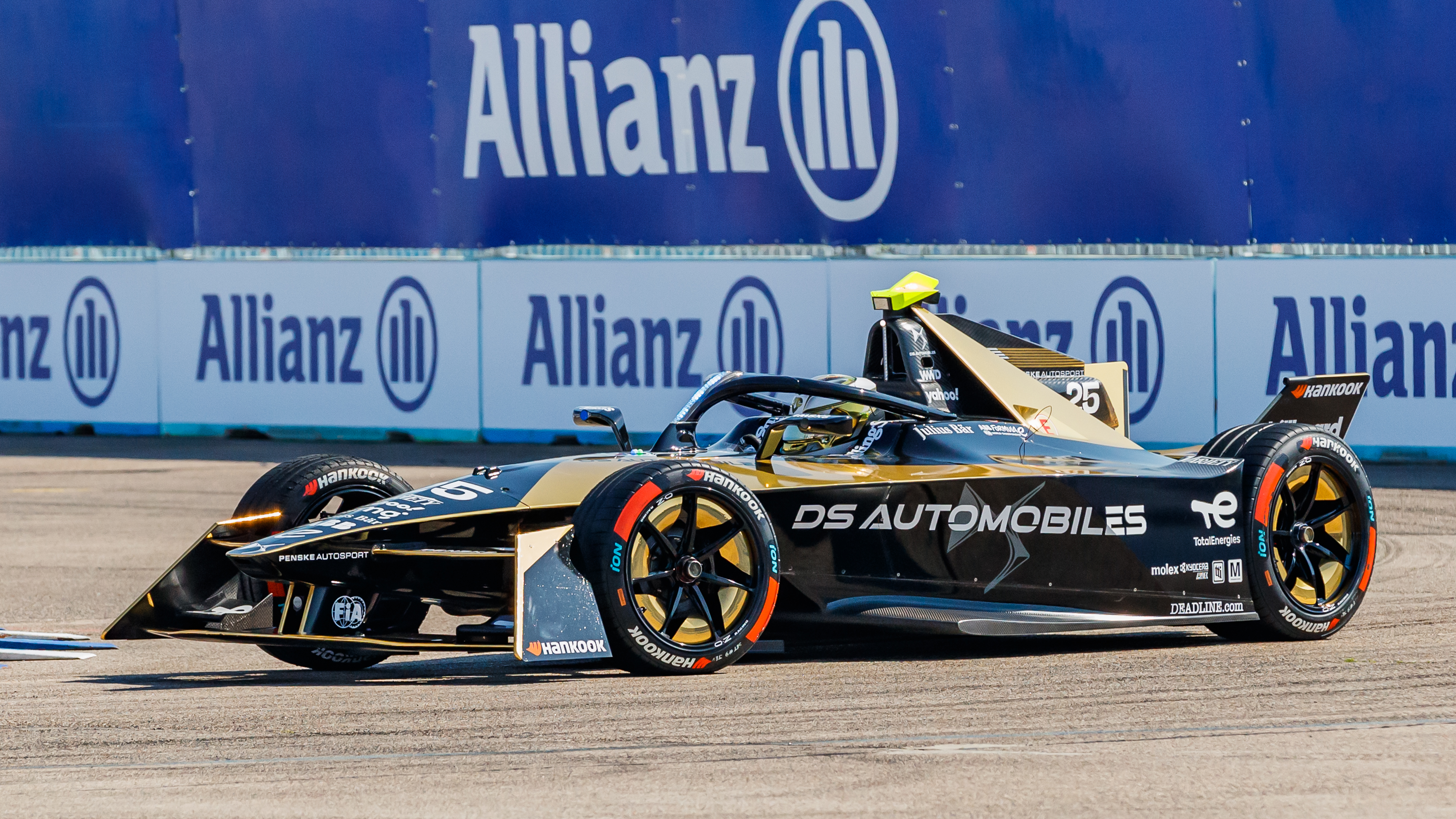
Vergne driving at the 2023 Berlin ePrix

==== 2022–23 season ====
In October 2022, it was announced that Vergne would be joining the newly formed DS Penske outfit alongside reigning champion Stoffel Vandoorne for the 2023 season. The season started out with disappointing rounds in Mexico City and Diriyah, with the Frenchman only taking points in one of the three races. In an unexpected manner however, Vergne bounced back at the inaugural Hyderabad ePrix, where he scored his first victory of the season, defending from a hard-charging Nick Cassidy during the final sequence of laps. He would come close to the top in the next round in Cape Town, where an audacious overtake from former teammate Felix da Costa relegated Vergne to second by the checkered flag.

==== 2023–24 season ====
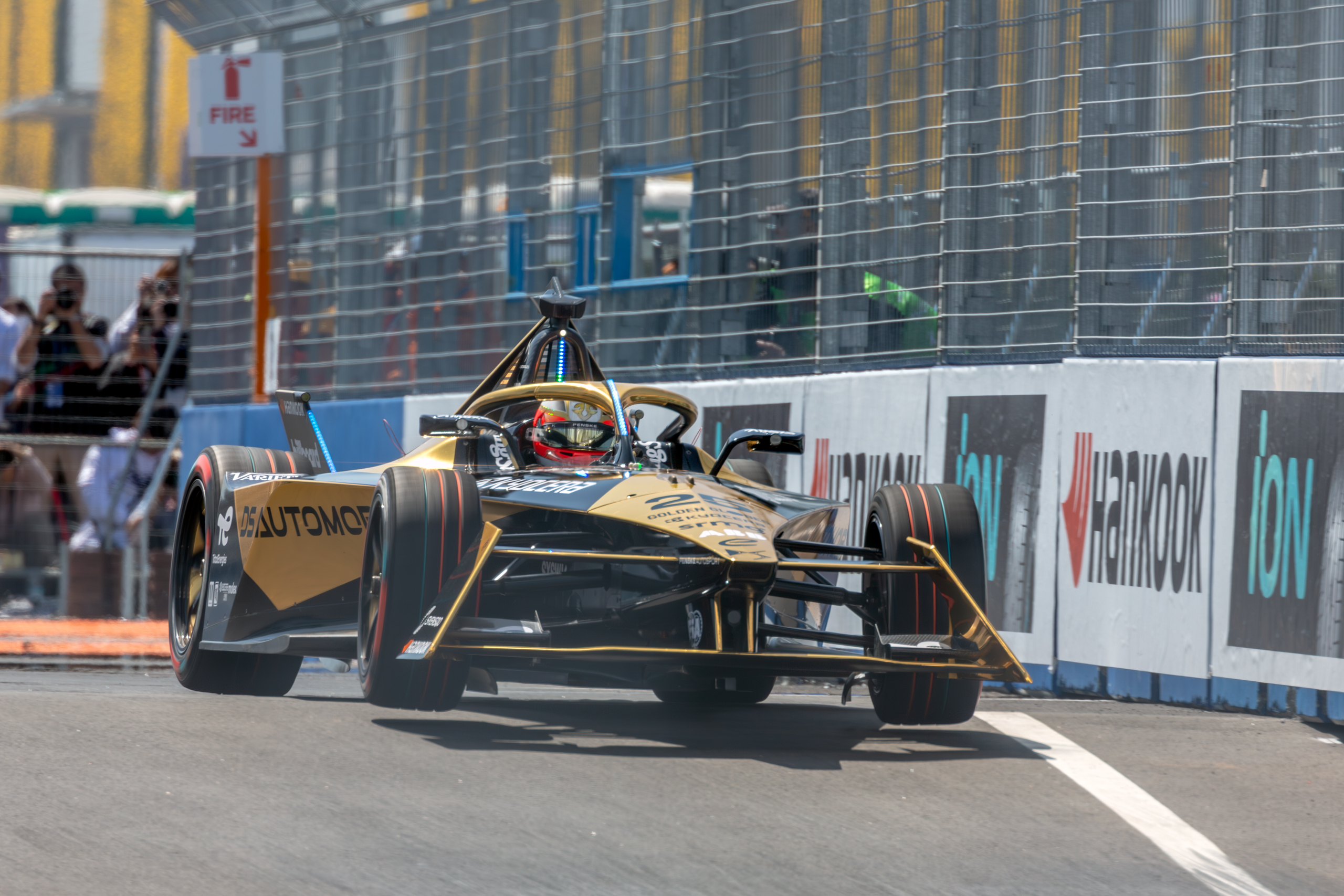
Vergne at the 2024 Tokyo ePrix

Vergne continued his relationship with DS Penske for the 2023–24 season alongside Stoffel Vandoorne once again. He finished sixth in the first race in Mexico, and became the second driver in history to score 1000 points. After a seventh-place finish at Misano, he broke the record for the most points scored in Formula E, previously held by di Grassi. Having setting pole positions for Diriyah race 1, Shanghai race 2 and Portland race 2, he broke the record for most pole positions in Formula E held by Sebastien Buemi.

==== 2024–25 season ====
Once again, Vergne remained with DS Penske for the 2024–25 season alongside his new partner Maximilian Günther. He achieved a season-high of second at Shanghai race 1. In Berlin, Vergne retired on lap 32 in race 1 due to a suspension failure before finishing third in race 2 for his second podium that season.

=== Citroën (2025–) ===
==== 2025–26 season ====
Following multiple seasons at DS Techeetah and DS Penske, Vergne switched to new outfit Citroën Racing for the 2025–26 season, partnering Nick Cassidy. At the season opener in Sao Paulo, a technical issue caused him to retire on lap 27. Jean-Éric completed the season level on points with Taylor Barnard but was ranked behind him in the standings due to Barnard's higher race finish of first at the season finale compard to Vergne's second place in Shanghai race 2.

==== 2026–27 season ====
Vergne will continue with Citroën Racing alongside Cassidy for the 2026–27 season.

== World Endurance Championship ==
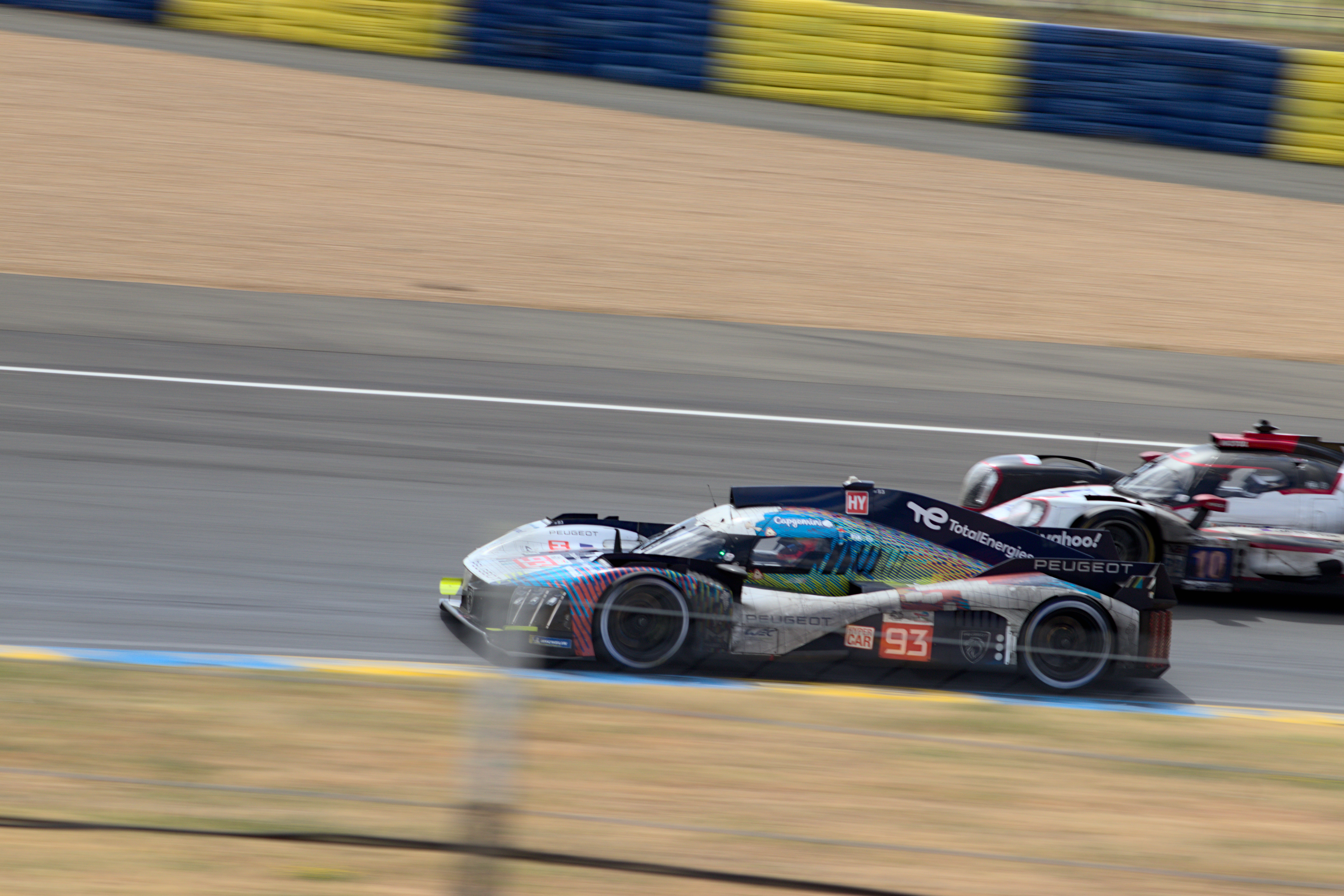
Vergne competing at the 2023 24 Hours of Le Mans

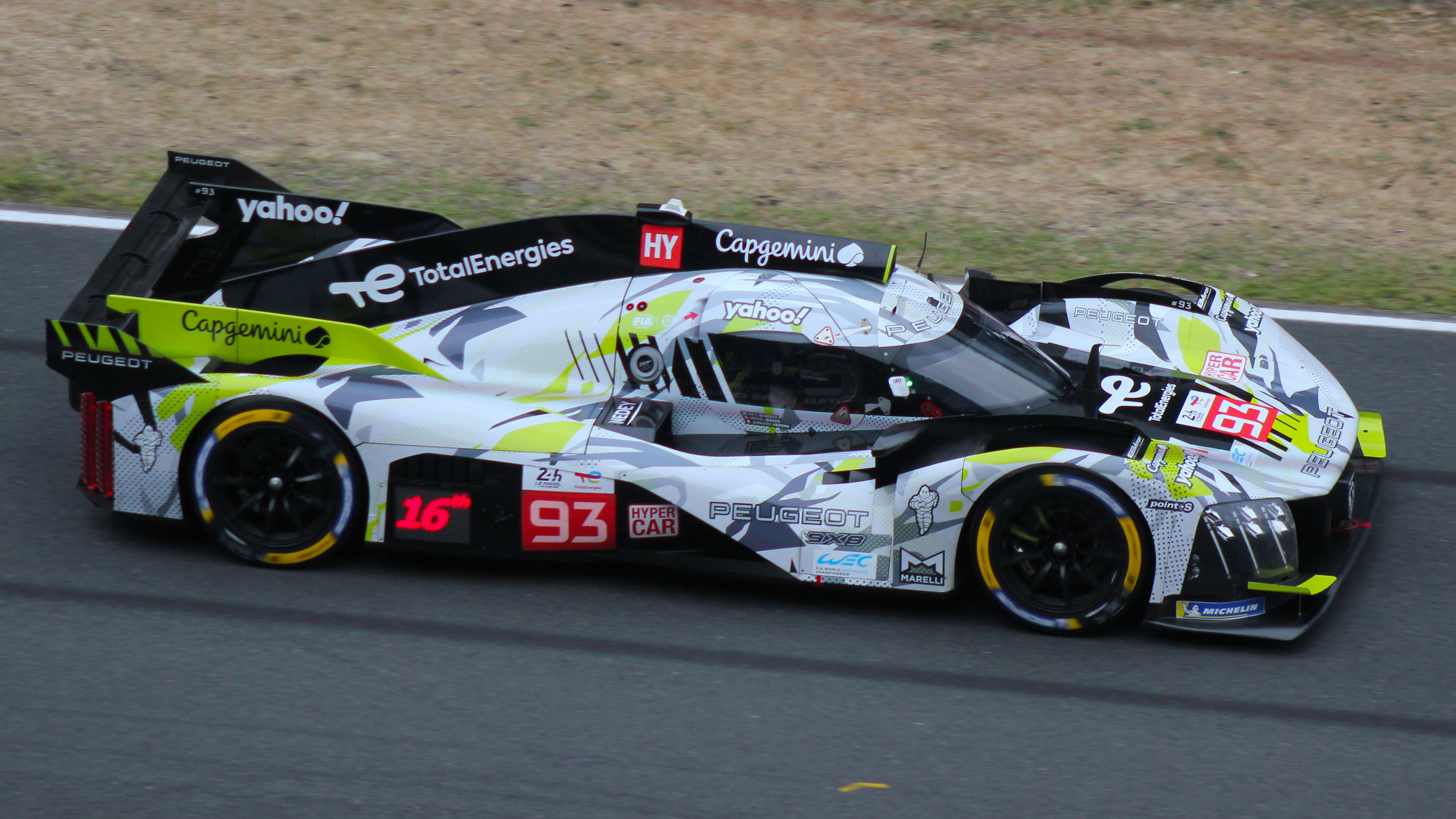
Vergne's No. 93 car at the 2025 24 Hours of Le Mans

Vergne signed with the Peugeot Sport factory team to compete at the 2022 FIA World Endurance Championship at the Hypercar class, having previously raced with CEFC Manor TRS Racing and G-Drive Racing at the LMP2 class.

== Personal life ==
In 2018, Vergne signed a partnership with Veloce Esports. They became the co-founders of Veloce Racing, a racing team currently part of Extreme E.

Vergne plays the piano. In addition to his native French, Vergne also speaks English, Spanish, and Italian. He considers André Lotterer, his teammate from 2017 to 2019, a close friend.

== Racing record ==
=== Career summary ===
Season	Series	Team	Races	Wins	Poles	F/Laps	Podiums	Points	Position
2007	Formula Campus Renault	Formule Campus	13	6	5	?	10	189	**1st**
2008	Eurocup Formula Renault 2.0	SG Formula	14	0	0	0	1	58	6th
2008	Formula Renault 2.0 WEC	SG Formula	15	0	0	0	3	95	4th
2009	Eurocup Formula Renault 2.0	SG Formula	14	4	5	2	9	128	**2nd**
2009	Formula Renault 2.0 WEC	SG Formula	14	3	2	0	10	143	**2nd**
2010	British Formula 3 International Series	Carlin	30	13	11	13	20	392	**1st**
2010	Masters of Formula 3	Carlin	1	0	0	1	0	N/A	4th
2010	Macau Grand Prix	Carlin	1	0	0	0	0	N/A	7th
2010	GP3 Series	Tech 1 Racing	4	0	0	0	0	9	17th
2010	Formula Renault 3.5 Series	Tech 1 Racing	6	1	0	0	4	53	8th
2011	Formula Renault 3.5 Series	Carlin	17	5	4	1	9	232	**2nd**
2011	Formula One	Scuderia Toro Rosso	Test driver						
2012	Formula One	Scuderia Toro Rosso	20	0	0	0	0	16	17th
2013	Formula One	Scuderia Toro Rosso	19	0	0	0	0	13	15th
2014	Formula One	Scuderia Toro Rosso	19	0	0	0	0	22	13th
2014–15	Formula E	Andretti Autosport	9	0	3	1	2	70	7th
2015	Formula One	Scuderia Ferrari	Test driver						
2015–16	Formula E	DS Virgin Racing	10	0	1	0	2	56	9th
2016	Formula One	Scuderia Ferrari	Test driver						
2016–17	Formula E	Techeetah	12	1	0	0	5	117	5th
2017	FIA World Endurance Championship - LMP2	CEFC Manor TRS Racing	8	0	0	0	1	81	10th
2017	24 Hours of Le Mans - LMP2	CEFC Manor TRS Racing	1	0	0	0	0	N/A	6th
2017	24H Series - A6	GP Extreme							
2017–18	Formula E	Techeetah	12	4	4	0	6	198	**1st**
2018	European Le Mans Series - LMP2	G-Drive Racing	5	3	1	1	3	88.25	**2nd**
2018	24 Hours of Le Mans - LMP2	G-Drive Racing	1	0	0	0	0	N/A	DSQ
2018–19	Formula E	DS Techeetah	13	3	1	3	5	136	**1st**
2018–19	FIA World Endurance Championship - LMP2	TDS Racing	1	0	0	0	0	12	16th
2019	European Le Mans Series - LMP2	G-Drive Racing	4	1	0	0	2	63	5th
2019	24 Hours of Le Mans - LMP2	G-Drive Racing	1	0	0	0	0	N/A	6th
2019–20	Formula E	DS Techeetah	11	1	2	0	3	86	**3rd**
2020	European Le Mans Series - LMP2	G-Drive Racing	1	0	0	0	1	18	13th
2020–21	Formula E	DS Techeetah	15	1	1	0	2	80	10th
2021	European Le Mans Series - LMP2	IDEC Sport	1	0	0	0	0	2	30th
2021–22	Formula E	DS Techeetah	16	0	2	0	5	144	4th
2022	FIA World Endurance Championship - Hypercar	Peugeot TotalEnergies	3	0	0	1	0	12	10th
2022–23	Formula E	DS Penske	16	1	0	2	3	107	5th
2023	FIA World Endurance Championship - Hypercar	Peugeot TotalEnergies	7	0	0	0	1	51	8th
2023	24 Hours of Le Mans - Hypercar	Peugeot TotalEnergies	1	0	0	0	0	N/A	8th
2023–24	Formula E	DS Penske	16	0	3	0	3	139	5th
2024	FIA World Endurance Championship - Hypercar	Peugeot TotalEnergies	7	0	0	0	1	41	13th
2024–25	Formula E	DS Penske	16	0	0	0	2	99	6th
2025	FIA World Endurance Championship - Hypercar	Peugeot TotalEnergies	7	0	0	0	1	38	13th
2025–26	Formula E	Citroën Racing Formula E Team	17	0	0	0	1	68	12th
2026	FIA World Endurance Championship - Hypercar	Peugeot TotalEnergies	Test and development driver						
2026–27	Formula E	Citroën Racing Formula E Team	0	0	0	0	0	0	TBD

^{*} Season still in progress.

=== Complete Formula Renault 2.0 WEC results ===
(key) (Races in bold indicate pole position) (Races in italics indicate fastest lap)

Year	Entrant	1	2	3	4	5	6	7	8	9	10	11	12	13	14	15	Pos	Points
2008	SG Formula	NOG; 1 Ret	NOG; 2; 9	DIJ; 1; 5	DIJ; 2; 5	VAL; 1; 4	VAL; 2 DSQ	LEM; 2	EST; 1; 2	EST; 2; 5	SPA; 1; 4	SPA; 2; 4	MAG; 1; 3	MAG; 2; 7	CAT; 1; 4	CAT; 2; 7	4th	95
2009	SG Formula	**NOG**; **1**; 1	**NOG**; **2**; 1	CAT; 1; 1	CAT; 2; 2	PAU; 1 Ret	PAU; 2; 10	MAG; 1; 8	MAG; 2; 3	SPA; 1; 2	SPA; 2; 3	**VAL**; **1**; 1	**VAL**; **2**; 1	ALG; 1; 3	ALG; 2; 6		2nd	143

=== Complete Eurocup Formula Renault 2.0 results ===
(key) (Races in bold indicate pole position) (Races in italics indicate fastest lap)

Year	Entrant	1	2	3	4	5	6	7	8	9	10	11	12	13	14	Pos	Points
2008	SG Drivers Project	SPA; 1; 10	SPA; 2; 24	SIL; 1; 38†	SIL; 2; 8	HUN; 1; 4	HUN; 2; 4	NÜR; 1; 6	NÜR; 2; 27	LMS; 1; 7	LMS; 2; 5	EST; 1; 4	EST; 2 Ret	CAT; 1; 12	CAT; 2; 3	6th	58
2009	SG Formula	CAT; 1 Ret	CAT; 2; 23†	SPA; 1; 3	SPA; 2; 8	**HUN**; **1**; 1	HUN; 2; 7	**SIL**; **1**; 3	**SIL**; **2**; 1	**LMS**; **1**; 1	**LMS**; **2**; 1	NÜR; 1; 3	NÜR; 2; 2	ALC; 1; 3	ALC; 2; 6	2nd	128

=== Complete British Formula Three Championship results ===
(key) (Races in bold indicate pole position; races in italics indicate fastest lap)

Year	Entrant	1	2	3	4	5	6	7	8	9	10	11	12	13	14	15	16	17	18	19	20	21	22	23	24	25	26	27	28	29	30	DC	Points
2010	Carlin	**OUL**; **1**; 1	OUL; 2; 5	**OUL**; **3**; 1	SIL1; 1; 4	SIL1; 2; 5	SIL1; 3; 6	**MAG**; **1**; 4	MAG; 2; 1	**MAG**; **3**; 2	**HOC**; **1**; 1	HOC; 2; 5	**HOC**; **3**; 1	ROC; 1; 1	ROC; 2; 9	ROC; 3; 2	**SPA**; **1**; 1	SPA; 2; 1	SPA; 3; 1	**THR**; **1**; 2	THR; 2; 1	**THR**; **3**; 1	**SIL2**; **1**; 2	SIL2; 2; 3	**SIL2**; **3**; 1	SNE; 1; 1	SNE; 2; 8	SNE; 3; 2	BRH; 1; 8	BRH; 2; 4	BRH; 3 Ret	1st	392

=== Complete GP3 Series results ===
(key) (Races in bold indicate pole position; races in italics indicate fastest lap)

Year	Entrant	1	2	3	4	5	6	7	8	9	10	11	12	13	14	15	16	DC	Points
2010	Tech 1 Racing	CAT; FEA; 5	CAT; SPR; 21	IST; FEA	IST; SPR	VAL; FEA; 4	VAL; SPR; 17	SIL; FEA	SIL; SPR	HOC; FEA	HOC; SPR	HUN; FEA	HUN; SPR	SPA; FEA	SPA; SPR	MNZ; FEA	MNZ; SPR	17th	9

=== Complete Formula Renault 3.5 Series results ===
(key) (Races in bold indicate pole position; races in italics indicate fastest lap)

Year	Team	1	2	3	4	5	6	7	8	9	10	11	12	13	14	15	16	17	Pos	Points
2010	Tech 1 Racing	ALC; 1	ALC; 2	SPA; 1	SPA; 2	MON; 1	BRN; 1	BRN; 2	MAG; 1	MAG; 2	HUN; 1	HUN; 2	HOC; 1; 11	HOC; 2; 5	SIL; 1; 1	SIL; 2; 3	CAT; 1; 3	CAT; 2; 2	8th	53
2011	Carlin	ALC; 1; 6	ALC; 2; 7	SPA; 1; 2	**SPA**; **2**; 1	MNZ; 1; 2	MNZ; 2; 1	MON; 1; 12	NÜR; 1 Ret	NÜR; 2; 4	**HUN**; **1**; 1	HUN; 2; 1	SIL; 1; 12	SIL; 2; 4	**LEC**; **1**; 1	**LEC**; **2**; 3	CAT; 1; 2	CAT; 2 Ret	2nd	232

=== Complete Formula One results ===
(key) (Races in bold indicate pole position; races in italics indicate fastest lap)

Year	Entrant	Chassis	Engine	1	2	3	4	5	6	7	8	9	10	11	12	13	14	15	16	17	18	19	20	WDC	Points
2011	Scuderia Toro Rosso	Toro Rosso STR6	Ferrari 056 2.4 V8	AUS	MAL	CHN	TUR	ESP	MON	CAN	EUR	GBR	GER	HUN	BEL	ITA	SIN	JPN	KOR; TD	IND	ABU; TD	BRA; TD		–	–
2012	Scuderia Toro Rosso	Toro Rosso STR7	Ferrari 056 2.4 V8	AUS; 11	MAL; 8	CHN; 16	BHR; 14	ESP; 12	MON; 12	CAN; 15	EUR; Ret	GBR; 14	GER; 14	HUN; 16	BEL; 8	ITA; Ret	SIN; Ret	JPN; 13	KOR; 8	IND; 15	ABU; 12	USA; Ret	BRA; 8	17th	16
2013	Scuderia Toro Rosso	Toro Rosso STR8	Ferrari 056 2.4 V8	AUS; 12	MAL; 10	CHN; 12	BHR; Ret	ESP; Ret	MON; 8	CAN; 6	GBR; Ret	GER; Ret	HUN; 12	BEL; 12	ITA; Ret	SIN; 14	KOR; 18^{†}	JPN; 12	IND; 13	ABU; 17	USA; 16	BRA; 15		15th	13
2014	Scuderia Toro Rosso	Toro Rosso STR9	Renault Energy F1‑2014 1.6 V6 t	AUS; 8	MAL; Ret	BHR; Ret	CHN; 12	ESP; Ret	MON; Ret	CAN; 8	AUT; Ret	GBR; 10	GER; 13	HUN; 9	BEL; 11	ITA; 13	SIN; 6	JPN; 9	RUS; 13	USA; 10	BRA; 13	ABU; 12		13th	22

^{†} Driver did not finish the Grand Prix, but was classified as he completed over 90% of the race distance.

=== Complete Formula E results ===
(key) (Races in bold indicate pole position; races in italics indicate fastest lap)

Year	Team	Chassis	Powertrain	1	2	3	4	5	6	7	8	9	10	11	12	13	14	15	16	17	Pos	Points
2014–15	Andretti Autosport	Spark SRT01-e	SRT01-e	BEI	PUT	**PDE**; 14†	BUE; 6	**MIA**; 18†	LBH; 2	MCO; Ret	BER; 7	**MSC**; 4	LDN; 3	LDN; 16†							7th	70
2015–16	DS Virgin Racing	Spark SRT01-e	Virgin Racing Engineering DSV-01	BEI; 12	PUT; Ret	PDE; 7	BUE; 11	MEX; 16	LBH; 13	PAR; 2	**BER**; 5	LDN; 3	LDN; 8								9th	56
2016–17	Techeetah	Spark SRT01-e	Renault Z.E. 16	HKG; Ret	MRK; 8	BUE; 2	MEX; 2	MCO; Ret	PAR; Ret	BER; 8	BER; 6	NYC; 2	NYC; 8	MTL; 2	MTL; 1						5th	117
2017–18	Techeetah	Spark SRT01-e	Renault Z.E. 17	**HKG**; 2	HKG; 4	MRK; 5	**SCL**; 1	MEX; 5	**PDE**; 1	RME; 5	**PAR**; 1	BER; 3	ZUR; 10	NYC; 5	NYC; 1						1st	198
2018–19	DS Techeetah	Spark SRT05e	DS E-TENSE FE19	ADR; 2	MRK; 5	SCL; Ret	MEX; 13	HKG; 13	SYX; 1	RME; 14	PAR; 6	MCO; 1	BER; 3	**BRN**; 1	NYC; 15	NYC; 7					1st	136
2019–20	DS Techeetah	Spark SRT05e	DS E-TENSE FE20	DIR; Ret	DIR; 8	SCL; Ret	MEX; 4	MRK; 3	BER; NC	BER; 10	**BER**; 3	**BER**; 1	BER; 18	BER; 7							3rd	86
2020–21	DS Techeetah	Spark SRT05e	DS E-TENSE FE20/21	DIR; 15	DIR; 12	RME; 1	RME; 11	VLC; 9	VLC; 7	MCO; 4	PUE; Ret	PUE; 8	NYC; 2	NYC; Ret	LDN; 12	LDN; 12	**BER**; 6	BER; 11			10th	80
2021–22	DS Techeetah	Spark SRT05e	DS E-TENSE FE21	DRH; 8	DRH; 6	MEX; 3	RME; 4	**RME**; 2	MCO; 3	BER; 2	BER; 9	**JAK**; 2	MRK; 4	NYC; 18	NYC; Ret	LDN; 14	LDN; Ret	SEO; 6	SEO; 6		4th	144
2022–23	DS Penske	Formula E Gen3	DS E-Tense FE23	MEX; 12	DRH; 7	DRH; 16	HYD; 1	CAP; 2	SAP; 5	BER; 7	BER; 3	MCO; 7	JAK; 5	JAK; 16	POR; 11	RME; 5	RME; 15	LDN; Ret	LDN; 22		5th	107
2023–24	DS Penske	Formula E Gen3	DS E-Tense FE23	MEX; 6	**DRH**; 2	DRH; 8	SAP; 7	TOK; 12	MIS; 6	MIS; 7	MCO; 4	BER; 2	BER; 10	**SIC**; 6	SIC; 7	POR; 3	**POR**; 5	LDN; 17	LDN; 5		5th	139
2024–25	DS Penske	Formula E Gen3 Evo	DS E-Tense FE25	SAO; 9	MEX; 5	JED; 6	JED; 7	MIA; 12	MCO; 12	MCO; 6	TKO; 6	TKO; 8	SHA; 2	SHA; 5	JKT; 16	BER; Ret	BER; 3	LDN; 5	LDN; 15		6th	99
2025–26	Citroën Racing	Formula E Gen3 Evo	Citroën ë-CX	SAO; 15†	MEX; 8	MIA; 15	JED; 8	JED; 9	MAD; 14	BER; 14	BER; 8	MCO; 16	MCO; 16	SAN; 8	SHA; 6	SHA; 2	TKO; 6	TKO; 5	LDN; Ret	LDN; 7	12th	68

^{†} Driver did not finish the race, but was classified as he completed over 90% of the race distance. ^{*} Season still in progress.

=== Complete FIA World Endurance Championship results ===
(key) (Races in bold indicate pole position; races in italics indicate fastest lap)

Year	Entrant	Class	Chassis	Engine	1	2	3	4	5	6	7	8	9	Rank	Points
2017	CEFC Manor TRS Racing	LMP2	Oreca 07	Gibson GK428 4.2 L V8	SIL; 6	SPA; 7	LMS; 4	NÜR	MEX; 3	COA; 6	FUJ; 5	SHA; 9	BHR; 6	10th	81
2018–19	TDS Racing	LMP2	Oreca 07	Gibson GK428 4.2 L V8	SPA	LMS	SIL	FUJ; 4	SHA	SEB	SPA	LMS		16th	12
2022	Peugeot TotalEnergies	Hypercar	Peugeot 9X8	Peugeot X6H 2.6 L Turbo V6	SEB	SPA	LMS	MNZ; Ret	FUJ; 4	BHR; Ret				10th	12
2023	Peugeot TotalEnergies	Hypercar	Peugeot 9X8	Peugeot X6H 2.6 L Turbo V6	SEB; 9	ALG; 7	SPA; 8	LMS; 6	MNZ; 3	FUJ; 8	BHR; 9			8th	51
2024	Peugeot TotalEnergies	Hypercar	Peugeot 9X8	Peugeot X6H 2.6 L Turbo V6	QAT; DSQ	IMO; 9	SPA	LMS; 12	SÃO; 8	COA; 12	FUJ; 4	BHR; 3		13th	41
2025	Peugeot TotalEnergies	Hypercar	Peugeot 9X8	Peugeot X6H 2.6 L Turbo V6	QAT; 9	IMO; 9	SPA; 11	LMS; 15	SÃO	COA; 4	FUJ; 2	BHR; 9		13th	38

=== Complete 24 Hours of Le Mans results ===
Year	Team	Co-Drivers	Car	Class	Laps	Pos.	Class Pos.
2017	(China) CEFC Manor TRS Racing	(Thailand) Tor Graves (Switzerland) Jonathan Hirschi	Oreca 07-Gibson	LMP2	360	7th	6th
2018	(Russia) G-Drive Racing	(Russia) Roman Rusinov (France) Andrea Pizzitola	Oreca 07-Gibson	LMP2	369	DSQ	DSQ
2019	(Russia) G-Drive Racing	(Russia) Roman Rusinov (Netherlands) Job van Uitert	Aurus 01-Gibson	LMP2	364	11th	6th
2020	(Russia) G-Drive Racing	(Russia) Roman Rusinov (Denmark) Mikkel Jensen	Aurus 01-Gibson	LMP2	367	9th	5th
2023	(France) Peugeot TotalEnergies	(United Kingdom) Paul di Resta (Denmark) Mikkel Jensen	Peugeot 9X8	Hypercar	330	8th	8th
2024	(France) Peugeot TotalEnergies	(Denmark) Mikkel Jensen (Switzerland) Nico Müller	Peugeot 9X8	Hypercar	309	12th	12th
2025	(France) Peugeot TotalEnergies	(United Kingdom) Paul di Resta (Denmark) Mikkel Jensen	Peugeot 9X8	Hypercar	379	16th	16th

=== Complete European Le Mans Series results ===
(key) (Races in bold indicate pole position; races in italics indicate fastest lap)

Year	Entrant	Class	Chassis	Engine	1	2	3	4	5	6	Rank	Points
2018	G-Drive Racing	LMP2	Oreca 07	Gibson GK428 4.2 L V8	LEC	MNZ; 1	RBR; 1	SIL; 1	**SPA**; 12‡	ALG; 4	2nd	88.25
2019	G-Drive Racing	LMP2	Aurus 01	Gibson GK428 4.2 L V8	LEC	MNZ	CAT; 1	SIL; 2	SPA; 4	ALG; 6	5th	63
2020	G-Drive Racing	LMP2	Aurus 01	Gibson GK428 4.2 L V8	LEC	SPA	LEC; 2	MNZ	ALG		13th	18
2021	IDEC Sport	LMP2	Oreca 07	Gibson GK428 4.2 L V8	CAT	RBR	LEC; 9	MNZ	SPA	ALG	30th	2

^{‡} Half points awarded as less than 75% of race distance was completed.

Sporting positions
Preceded by Kévin Estre	French Formula Renault Campus; Champion; 2007	Succeeded by Arthur Pic (Formul'Academy)
Preceded by Jules Bianchi	French Formula Renault 2.0; Champion; 2008	Succeeded by Nathanaël Berthon
Preceded by Daniel Ricciardo	British Formula Three Champion; 2010	Succeeded by Felipe Nasr
Preceded by Lucas di Grassi	Formula E Champion; 2017–18; 2018–19	Succeeded by António Félix da Costa
Preceded by Inaugural	Voestalpine European Races Trophy; Champion; 2018–19	Succeeded by Not held
Awards and achievements
Preceded by 2010 Singapore Grand Prix	Autosport Awards; Moment of the Year; 2019	Succeeded by 2020 Italian Grand Prix
