= 2008 Formula Renault 2.0 West European Cup =

Motor racing competition

Seasons
- ← 2007 2009 →

The 2008 Formula Renault 2.0 West European Cup was the first season for the WEC series. It absorbed the French Formula Renault championship that offers a reward for the best French driver and rookie driver. It also has the Challenger Cup which is for drivers using cars that run with the 2004 aerodynamic kit.

== Teams and drivers ==
Team	No.	Driver name	Rounds
(Spain) Epsilon Euskadi	1	(United States) Jake Rosenzweig	All
(Spain) Epsilon Euskadi	2	(Spain) Pablo Montilla	All
(Spain) Epsilon Euskadi	3	(Dominican Republic) Richard Campollo	All
(Spain) Epsilon Euskadi	7	(Spain) Albert Costa	All
(Spain) Epsilon Euskadi	8	(Spain) Roberto Merhi	All
(Spain) Epsilon Euskadi	62	(Brazil) Pedro Bianchini	6
(France) SG Formula	4	(United Arab Emirates) Ramez Azzam	1-3, 5–8
(France) SG Formula	5	(Russia) Anton Nebylitskiy	All
(France) SG Formula	6	(France) Jean-Éric Vergne	All
(France) SG Formula	12	(Australia) Daniel Ricciardo	All
(France) SG Formula	14	(Italy) Andrea Caldarelli	All
(France) SG Formula	15	(Spain) Miki Monrás	6-8
(France) SG Formula	33	(France) Tristan Vautier	3-8
(France) Pole Services	10	(France) Benjamin Lariche	All
(France) Pole Services	11	(France) Antony Tardieu	All
(France) Pole Services	16	(France) Maxime Jousse	All
(Portugal) Araujo Competicao	17	(Portugal) Gonçalo Araújo	1
(Portugal) Araujo Competicao	18	(Portugal) Hugo Mesquita	1
(Portugal) Araujo Competicao	19	(Portugal) Luís Santos	1
(Belgium) Boutsen Energy Racing	20	(Belgium) Benjamin Bailly	1
(Belgium) Boutsen Energy Racing	21	(France) Nathanaël Berthon	All
(Belgium) Boutsen Energy Racing	68	(New Zealand) Dominic Storey	5
(France) TCS Racing	22	(France) Julien Abelli	All
(France) TCS Racing	34	(France) Mathieu Arzeno	3-4, 7
(France) TCS Racing	45	(France) Nicolas Marroc	1-4
(France) Team Palmyr	23	(France) Didier Colombat	1-4, 6–8
(France) Team Palmyr	24	(France) Jean-Michel Ogier	1-4, 6–8
(France) Team Palmyr	25	(France) Jean-Marc Menahem	1-2, 4, 6, 8
(France) Team Palmyr	27	(France) Max Lefèvre	1-4, 6–8
(France) Team Palmyr	28	(France) David Zollinger	1-2, 4, 8
(France) Team Palmyr	50	(France) Gérard Tonelli	3
(France) Racing Team Trajectoire	26	(France) Sylvain Milesi	1-3
(France) Epsilon Sport	29	(France) Bastien Borget	All
(France) Epsilon Sport	33	(France) Tristan Vautier	1-2
(France) Epsilon Sport	34	(France) Mathieu Arzeno	3-4, 7
(France) Epsilon Sport	35	(Monaco) Stéphane Richelmi	1-4
(France) Epsilon Sport	51	(Brazil) André Negrão	7-8
(Spain) iQuick	30	(Spain) Mikel Otegi	All
(Spain) iQuick	31	(Spain) Himar Acosta	3
(Spain) iQuick	32	(Spain) Marcelo Conchado	1
(Spain) Amiter Galuppo Sport	32	(Spain) Marcelo Conchado	3, 7
(United Kingdom) Hitech Junior Team	36	(United Kingdom) Richard Singleton	3, 6–7
(United Kingdom) Hitech Junior Team	37	(Spain) Miki Monrás	1-5
(United Kingdom) Hitech Junior Team	38	(United Kingdom) Luciano Bacheta	1, 6–7
(United Kingdom) Hitech Junior Team	39	(Colombia) Juan Jacobo	7
(United Kingdom) Hitech Junior Team	40	(Australia) Ashley Walsh	All
(United Kingdom) Fortec Motorsports	41	(United Kingdom) Dean Smith	6, 8
(United Kingdom) Fortec Motorsports	42	(United Kingdom) Daniel McKenzie	All
(United Kingdom) Fortec Motorsports	43	(Brazil) Gabriel Dias	1-6
(United Kingdom) Fortec Motorsports	54	(Netherlands) Thomas Hylkema	6
(United Kingdom) Fortec Motorsports	58	(Sweden) Fredrik Blomstedt	6
(Spain) Rodrive Competicoes	46	(Spain) Pol Rosell	3, 5, 8
(United Kingdom) Manor Motorsport	52	(United Kingdom) Alexander Sims	6
(United Kingdom) Manor Motorsport	56	(United Kingdom) Henry Surtees	6
(Netherlands) MP Motorsport	53	(Netherlands) Daniël de Jong	6
(Switzerland) Jenzer Motorsport	77	(Switzerland) Nico Müller	8
(France) Lycée D'Artagnan	132	(France) Daniel Harout	1
(France) Lycée D'Artagnan	327	(France) Laurent Lamolinairie	1

== Race calendar and results ==
Round		Circuit	Date	Pole position	Fastest lap	Winning driver	Winning team
1	1	(France) Circuit Nogaro	March 23	(Australia) Daniel Ricciardo	(Australia) Daniel Ricciardo	(Australia) Daniel Ricciardo	(France) SG Formula
1	2	(France) Circuit Nogaro	March 24	(Australia) Daniel Ricciardo	(Italy) Andrea Caldarelli	(Italy) Andrea Caldarelli	(France) SG Formula
2	3	(France) Dijon-Prenois	May 10	(Spain) Roberto Merhi	(Australia) Daniel Ricciardo	(Australia) Daniel Ricciardo	(France) SG Formula
2	4	(France) Dijon-Prenois	May 11	(Australia) Daniel Ricciardo	(Australia) Daniel Ricciardo	(Australia) Daniel Ricciardo	(France) SG Formula
3	5	(Spain) Circuit de Valencia	June 21	(Australia) Daniel Ricciardo	(Australia) Daniel Ricciardo	(Australia) Daniel Ricciardo	(France) SG Formula
3	6	(Spain) Circuit de Valencia	June 22	(Australia) Daniel Ricciardo	(Spain) Roberto Merhi	(France) Benjamin Lariche	(France) Pole Services
4	7	(France) Circuit de la Sarthe	September 7	(Australia) Daniel Ricciardo	(Spain) Roberto Merhi	(Australia) Daniel Ricciardo	(France) SG Formula
5	8	(Portugal) Autódromo do Estoril	September 27	(Spain) Albert Costa	(Australia) Daniel Ricciardo	(Australia) Daniel Ricciardo	(France) SG Formula
5	9	(Portugal) Autódromo do Estoril	September 28	(Australia) Daniel Ricciardo	(Spain) Roberto Merhi	(Spain) Roberto Merhi	(Spain) Epsilon Euskadi
5	10	(Belgium) Circuit de Spa-Francorchamps	October 4	(Spain) Roberto Merhi	(Spain) Roberto Merhi	(Spain) Roberto Merhi	(Spain) Epsilon Euskadi
5	11	(Belgium) Circuit de Spa-Francorchamps	October 5	(Australia) Daniel Ricciardo	(Spain) Roberto Merhi	(Australia) Daniel Ricciardo	(France) SG Formula
6	12	(France) Circuit de Nevers Magny-Cours	October 11	(Spain) Roberto Merhi	(Spain) Roberto Merhi	(Spain) Roberto Merhi	(Spain) Epsilon Euskadi
6	13	(France) Circuit de Nevers Magny-Cours	October 12	(Spain) Roberto Merhi	(Spain) Roberto Merhi	(Italy) Andrea Caldarelli	(France) SG Formula
7	14	(Spain) Circuit de Catalunya	October 18	(Australia) Daniel Ricciardo	(Australia) Daniel Ricciardo	(Australia) Daniel Ricciardo	(France) SG Formula
7	15	(Spain) Circuit de Catalunya	October 19	(Australia) Daniel Ricciardo	(Australia) Daniel Ricciardo	(Italy) Andrea Caldarelli	(France) SG Formula

== Results and standings ==
Race point system
Position	1st	2nd	3rd	4th	5th	6th	7th	8th	9th	10th
Points	15	12	10	8	6	5	4	3	2	1

1 point is given to every pole position holder. 1 point is also given to the fastest driver in each lap. There are 2 race rounds. The first is between 60 kilometres (37 mi) and 80 kilometres (50 mi). The second race is between 20 and 30 minutes.

In Round 6 of the Valencia race, Daniel Ricciardo, Andrea Caldarelli and Jean-Éric Vergne were disqualified for technical regulation non-conformity in their SG Formula's rear wings. Benjamin Lariche, who came in 3rd, was declared the race winner instead.

=== Drivers ===
Pos	Driver	(France) NOG		(France) DIJ		(Spain) VAL		(France) LEM	(Portugal) EST		(Belgium) SPA		(France) MAG		(Spain) CAT		Points
Pos	Driver	1	2	3	4	5	6	7	8	9	10	11	12	13	14	15	Points
1	(Australia) Daniel Ricciardo	1	5	1	1	1	DSQ	1	1	2	2	1	6	4	1	2	192
2	(Spain) Roberto Merhi	3	2	2	2	2	4	3	3	1	1	2	1	3	3	3	184
3	(Italy) Andrea Caldarelli	2	1	4	4	3	DSQ	8	Ret	9	3	3	4	1	2	1	129
4	(France) Jean-Éric Vergne	Ret	9	5	5	4	DSQ	2	2	5	4	4	3	7	4	7	95
5	(Spain) Albert Costa	8	6	3	10	6	2	Ret	17	4	11	8	2	2	Ret	5	85
6	(France) Tristan Vautier	4	3	14	7	11	12	6	4	3	10	5	5	5	5	6	79
7	(Russia) Anton Nebylitskiy	10	8	6	3	5	7	12	8	21	24	18	DNS	9	9	9	41
8	(Spain) Miki Monrás	15	11	11	Ret	19	3	Ret	6	19	5	9	19	11	7	17	30
9	(United States) Jake Rosenzweig	9	Ret	8	9	12	14	24	5	6	13	10	8	12	8	13	30
10	(France) Benjamin Lariche	14	19	22	Ret	Ret	1	13	14	8	15	19	Ret	Ret	24	20	18
11	(Dominican Republic) Richard Campollo	Ret	4	10	12	7	Ret	21	15	Ret	21	15	DNS	Ret	10	12	16
12	(France) Bastien Borget	6	28	DNS	21	Ret	10	22	16	Ret	32	21	10	6	12	11	14
13	(France) Julien Abelli	DNS	7	13	13	9	11	5	Ret	11	Ret	16	13	10	13	18	14
14	(Brazil) Gabriel Dias	22	29	15	8	8	6	26	9	14	18	DNS					13
15	(France) Mathieu Arzeno					Ret	Ret	4					7	Ret			12
16	(Monaco) Stéphane Richelmi	5	10	16	11	17	8	17									10
17	(France) Antony Tardieu	17	12	12	6	13	16	25	Ret	12	23	11	20	15	Ret	10	10
18	(France) Nathanaël Berthon	23	13	21	14	Ret	13	9	10	10	7	Ret	23	Ret	14	15	9
19	(Australia) Ashley Walsh	12	17	19	15	21	23	7	18	7	17	22	15	16	Ret	25	8
20	(Spain) Himar Acosta					16	5										6
21	(France) Maxime Jousse	11	Ret	7	17	22	17	16	Ret	DNS	Ret	14	14	13	19	21	5
22	(United Arab Emirates) Ramez Azzam	19	Ret	9	Ret	15	24		11	16	20	23	18	8	15	19	5
23	(United Kingdom) Daniel McKenzie	16	15	20	20	24	18	20	7	17	16	20	17	17	16	16	4
24	(United Kingdom) Richard Singleton					10	9				14	17	12	Ret			4
25	(Spain) Miguel Otegui	7	Ret	Ret	18	18	Ret	23	13	15	25	Ret	16	19	25	22	4
26	(United Kingdom) Luciano Bacheta	13	14								31	Ret	9	14			2
27	(France) Nicolas Marroc	18	Ret	17	16	14	Ret	10									1
28	(Spain) Pablo Montilla	20	21	18	19	20	15	Ret	12	13	19	Ret	11	Ret	11	14	1
29	(France) David Zollinger	24	16	24	25			11							18	23	0
30	(France) Jean-Michel Ogier	27	23	27	24	28	21	14			29	DNS	24	21	23	28	0
31	(France) Max Lefèvre	26	27	26	22	25	22	15			27	Ret	25	22	20	29	0
32	(Portugal) Gonçalo Araújo	21	18														0
33	(France) Jean-Marc Menahem	31	24			Ret	Ret	18			28	Ret			21	27	0
34	(Spain) Pol Rosell					Ret	DNS		Ret	18					DSQ	26	0
35	(France) Didier Colombat	28	22	25	23	27	20	19			30	Ret	26	20	22	30	0
36	(France) Sylvain Milesi	30	Ret	23	Ret	23	19										0
37	(New Zealand) Dominic Storey								Ret	20							0
38	(Belgium) Benjamin Bailly	25	20														0
39	(Portugal) Luís Santos	25	Ret														0
40	(Spain) Marcello Conchado	29	25			Ret	Ret						DNS	DNS			0
41	(Portugal) Hugo Filipe Mesquita	32	26														0
42	(France) Gérard Tonelli					26	35										0
Guest drivers ineligible for points
	(Switzerland) Nico Müller														Ret	4	
	(United Kingdom) Henry Surtees										6	12					
	(United Kingdom) Dean Smith										8	6			6	8	
	(Netherlands) Daniël de Jong										22	7					
	(United Kingdom) Alexander Sims										9	Ret					
	(Sweden) Fredrik Blomstedt										12	13					
	(Brazil) André Negrão												DNS	Ret	17	24	
	(Colombia) Juan Jacobo												22	18			
	(Netherlands) Thomas Hylkema										25	Ret					
	(Brazil) Pedro Bianchini										Ret	Ret					

=== Teams ===
Pos	Team	Points
1	(France) SG Formula	320
2	(Spain) Epsilon Euskadi	268
3	(Spain) Epsilon Sport	46
4	(France) Pole Services	28
5	(United Kingdom) Hitech Junior Team	24
6	(France) TCS Racing	18
7	(United Kingdom) Fortec Motorsport	17
8	(Spain) iQuick-Valencia	10
9	(Belgium) Boutsen Energy Racing	9
NC	(France) Team Palmyr	0
NC	(France) Racing Team Trajectoire	0
NC	(Portugal) Araújo Competição	0
NC	(Spain) Rodrive Competições	0
NC	(United Kingdom) Manor Motorsport	–
NC	(Netherlands) MP Motorsport	–

=== French Formula Renault championship ===
Pos	Driver	Points
1	(France) Jean-Éric Vergne	119
2	(France) Tristan Vautier	107
3	(France) Antony Tardieu	63
4	(France) Julien Abelli	59
5	(France) Maxime Jousse	45
6	(France) Nathanaël Berthon	44
7	(France) Bastien Borget	39
8	(France) Benjamin Lariche	31
9	(France) Mathieu Arzeno	23
10	(France) Nicolas Marroc	20
11	(France) Max Lefèvre	15
12	(France) David Zollinger	13
13	(France) Jean-Michel Ogier	13
14	(France) Didier Colombat	11
15	(France) Jean-Marc Menahem	5
16	(France) Sylvain Milesi	2
17	(France) Gérard Tonelli	0

=== Rookies championship ===
Pos	Driver	Points
1	(France) Jean-Éric Vergne	177
2	(France) Tristan Vautier	154
3	(United States) Jake Rosenzweig	104
4	(Spain) Miki Monrás	80
5	(France) Julien Abelli	73
6	(Dominican Republic) Richard Campollo	61
7	(France) Antony Tardieu	52
8	(France) Nathanaël Berthon	52
9	(France) Maxime Jousse	43
10	(Brazil) Gabriel Dias	41
11	(Australia) Ashley Walsh	37
12	(United Arab Emirates) Ramez Azzam	36
13	(United Kingdom) Daniel McKenzie	35
14	(Spain) Miguel Otegui	27
15	(United Kingdom) Luciano Bacheta	19
16	(France) Max Lefèvre	8

=== Challenger Cup ===
Pos	Driver	Points
1	(France) Max Lefèvre	150
2	(France) Didier Colombat	134
3	(France) Jean-Michel Ogier	131
4	(France) David Zollinger	98
5	(France) Jean-Marc Menahem	66
6	(France) Gérard Tonelli	20
